= Oliver Gavin =

British racing driver

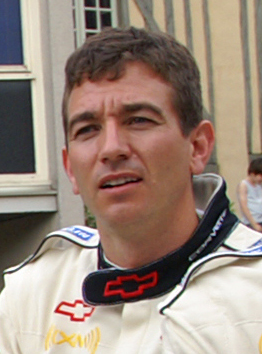
- Gavin in 2009
- Nationality: (United Kingdom) British
- Born: Oliver Benjamin Gavin; 29 September 1972 (age 54) Huntingdon, England
- Categorisation: FIA Platinum (until 2022); FIA Gold (2023–)

24 Hours of Le Mans career
- Years: 2001 – 2019
- Teams: Saleen-Allen Speedlab, Corvette Racing
- Best finish: 4th overall (2006)
- Class wins: 5 (2002, 2004, 2005, 2006, 2015)

Oliver Benjamin Gavin (born 29 September 1972) is a British former racing driver who joined Corvette Racing in 2002. He has won five American Le Mans Series class championships, five 24 Hours of Le Mans class wins, six 12 Hours of Sebring class wins and five Petit Le Mans class wins.

== Biography ==
Gavin was raised in the village of Felmersham, Bedfordshire. He attended the local Primary school, Pinchmill. At age nine he attended Lincroft Middle School and then took his GCSEs and A-levels at Sharnbrook Upper School and Community College.

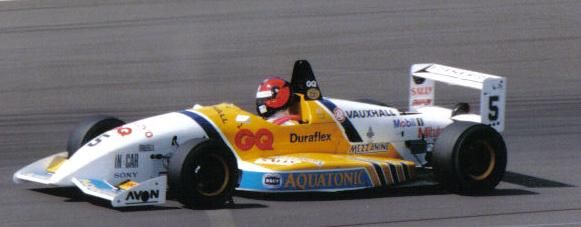
Gavin won British F3 in 1995 whilst driving for Edenbridge Racing.

Born in Huntingdon, Gavin was introduced to motor racing through the traditional karting route, and won the McLaren Autosport BRDC Award in 1991. After finishing as runner-up in the 1993 British F3 series to Kelvin Burt, Gavin graduated to Formula 3000 in 1994 with Omegaland. He failed to score any points in the five races he contested, and subsequently opted to drop back down to F3 for 1995. He managed to overcome rival Ralph Firman in the final round to snatch the title.

Gavin was test driver for the ill-fated mid-1990s Pacific Grand Prix team. It was proposed that he would drive for the team in the 1995 Australian Grand Prix, but he was not granted the required FIA Super Licence. Gavin also drove the Safety Car from 1997 to 1999 for the Formula One championship, and tested for Renault until 2006.

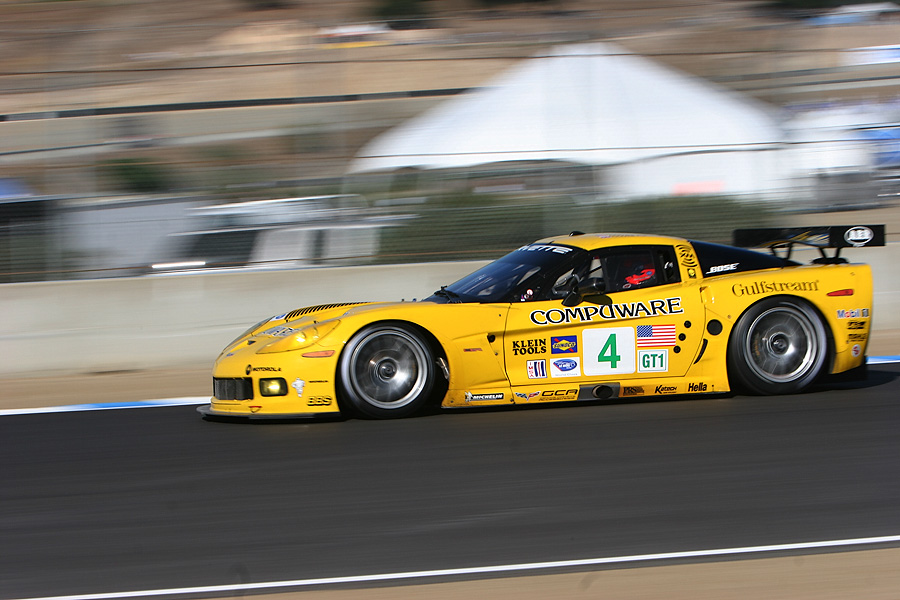
Gavin won the ALMS title in 2006 with the Chevrolet Corvette C6.R.

After winning the 12 Hours of Sebring on debut for Saleen in 2001, Gavin became a Corvette Racing factory driver in 2002, racing full-time in the American Le Mans Series GT1 and GT2 classes and later the IMSA SportsCar Championship GTLM class. His full-time codrivers have been Olivier Beretta (2004–2010), Jan Magnussen (2010–2011) and Tommy Milner (2012–2020).

Gavin has won his class at Le Mans on five occasions (2002, 2004, 2005, 2006 and 2015), the 12 Hours of Sebring six times (2001, 2002, 2006, 2007, 2013 and 2016), and Petit Le Mans another five times (2002, 2004, 2005, 2007 and 2010). Also, he won the ALMS GT1 titles in 2005, 2006 and 2007, the GT2 title in 2012, and the IMSA GTLM title in 2016.

Gavin announced his retirement from professional racing on 31 October 2020, with the 2021 WEC 6 Hours of Spa-Francorchamps being his final race. He placed fourth in the GTE Pro class with co-driver, Antonio Garcia, and 18th overall.

Gavin announced in 2021 that he would be continuing his working relationship with Chevrolet with the formation of a new racing school, the Oliver Gavin Driving Academy (OGDA), featuring Corvette C8 Stingrays as the primary instructional vehicle. In 2023, he founded Oliver Gavin Motorsport Management (OGMM), which currently oversees the careers of Logan Sargeant, Colin Braun and Ben Tuck among others.

Gavin lives in a village east of Northampton with his wife, Helen, and their three children.

== Racing record ==
=== Complete International Formula 3000 results ===
(key) (Races in bold indicate pole position) (Races in italics indicate fastest lap)

Year	Entrant	Chassis	Engine	1	2	3	4	5	6	7	8	9	10	Pos.	Pts
1994	Omegaland	Lola T94/50	Zytek-Judd	SIL; 10	PAU; DNQ	CAT; Ret	PER; Ret							NC	0
1994	Nordic Racing	Lola T94/50	Ford Cosworth					HOC; DNS	SPA	EST	MAG			NC	0
1997	BSE Salisbury Engineering	Lola T96/50	Zytek-Judd	SIL; DNQ	PAU; DNQ	HEL; DNQ	NÜR	PER	HOC	A1R	SPA	MUG	JER	NC	0
1999	European Edenbridge Racing	Lola T99/50	Zytek	IMO; 12	MON; 4	CAT; DNQ	MAG; DNQ	SIL; 14	A1R; DNQ	HOC; DNQ	HUN; DNQ	SPA; 9	NÜR; 8	16th	3

=== Complete International Touring Car Championship results ===
(key) (Races in bold indicate pole position) (Races in italics indicate fastest lap)

Year	Team	Car	1	2	3	4	5	6	7	8	9	10	11	12	13	14	15	16	17	18	19	20	21	22	23	24	25	26	Pos.	Pts
1996	Joest Racing Opel	Opel Calibra V6 4x4	HOC; 1 Ret	HOC; 2 DNS	NÜR; 1; 14	NÜR; 2 Ret	EST; 1; 6	EST; 2; 6	HEL; 1; 10†	HEL; 2 Ret	NOR; 1; 10	NOR; 2; 12	DIE; 1; 17	DIE; 2; 9	SIL; 1; 11	SIL; 2 Ret	NÜR; 1; 16	NÜR; 2 Ret	MAG; 1; 12	MAG; 2; 15	MUG; 1; 17	MUG; 2 Ret	HOC; 1	HOC; 2	INT; 1; 11	INT; 2; 15	SUZ; 1; 16	SUZ; 2; 11	23rd	16
Sources:

- † — Retired, but was classified as he completed 90% of the winner's race distance.

=== American Le Mans Series results ===
(key) (Races in bold indicate pole position; results in italics indicate fastest lap)

Year	Team	Class	Make	Engine	1	2	3	4	5	6	7	8	9	10	11	12	Pos.	Points	Ref
2000	Intersport Racing	LMP	Lola B2K/10	Judd GV4 4.0L V10	SEB	CHA	SIL	NÜR	SON	MOS	TEX	ROS	PET; Ret	MON	LSV	ADE			
2001	Konrad Team Saleen	GTS	Saleen S7-R	Ford 7.0L V8	TEX	SEB; 1	DON; 2	JAR	SON	POR	MOS	MID	MON						
2001	Park Place Racing Fordahl Motorsports	GTS	Saleen S7-R	Ford 7.0L V8										PET; 4					
2002	Corvette Racing	GTS	Chevrolet Corvette C5-R	Chevrolet 7.0 L V8	SEB; 1	SON	MID	AME; 2	WAS	TRO	MOS	MON	MIA	PET; 1					
2003	Corvette Racing	GTS	Chevrolet Corvette C5-R	Chevrolet 7.0 L V8	SEB; 3†	ATL; 1	SON; 2	TRO; 1	MOS; Ret	AME; 5	MON; 3	MIA; DNS	PET; 3						
2004	Corvette Racing	GTS	Chevrolet Corvette C5-R	Chevrolet 7.0 L V8	SEB; Ret	MDO; 2	LRP; 1	SON; 3	POR; 2	MOS; 1	ELK; 1	PET; 1	LAG; 2						
2005	Corvette Racing	GT1	Chevrolet Corvette C6.R	Chevrolet LS7.R 7.0 L V8	SEB; 3	ATL; 2	MID; 2	LIM; 1	SON; 2	POR; 1	AME; 1	MOS; 1	PET; 1	MON; 1					
2006	Corvette Racing	GT1	Chevrolet Corvette C6.R	Chevrolet LS7.R 7.0 L V8	SEB; 1	TEX; 1	MID; 1	LIM; 4	UTA; 4	POR; 1	AME; 2	MOS; 2	PET; 3	MON; 2			1st	176	
2007	Corvette Racing	GT1	Chevrolet Corvette C6.R	Chevrolet LS7.R 7.0 L V8	SEB; 1	STP; 1	LNB; 1	TEX; 2	UTA; 1	LIM; 1	MID; 1	AME; 1	MOS; 2	DET; 2	PET; 1	MON; 1	1st	246	
2008	Corvette Racing	GT1	Chevrolet Corvette C6.R	Chevrolet LS7.R 7.0 L V8	SEB; 2	STP; 1	LBH; 2	UTA; 2	LRP; 2†	MDO; 2	ELK; 3†	MOS; 2	DET; 1	PET; 2	LAG; 1		3rd	215	
2009	Corvette Racing	GT1	Chevrolet Corvette C6.R	Chevrolet LS7.R 7.0 L V8	SEB; 2	STP	LBH; 1	UTA	LRP								NC	-	
2009	Corvette Racing	GT2	Chevrolet Corvette C6.R	Chevrolet 6.0 L V8						MDO; 4	ELK; 6	MOS; 3	PET; 4	LAG; 10			16th	55	
2010	Corvette Racing	GT	Chevrolet Corvette C6.R	Chevrolet 5.5 L V8	SEB; 9	LBH; 9	LAG; 3	UTA; 10	LRP; 5	MDO; 2	**ELK**; 3	MOS; 4	PET; 1				5th	110	
2011	Corvette Racing	GT	Chevrolet Corvette C6.R	Chevrolet 5.5 L V8	SEB; 4	LBH; 2	LRP; 10	MOS; 1	MDO; 2	ELK; 5	BAL; 3	LAG; 5	PET; 4				2nd	135	
2012	Corvette Racing	GT	Chevrolet Corvette C6.R	Chevrolet 5.5 L V8	SEB; 3	LBH; 1	LAG; 1	LRP; 3	MOS; 10	MDO; 1	ELK; 4	**BAL**; 2	VIR; 1	PET; 12			1st	146	
2013	Corvette Racing	GT	Chevrolet Corvette C6.R	Chevrolet 5.5 L V8	SEB; 1	LBH; 4	LAG; 9	LRP; 6	MOS; 1	ELK; 3	BAL; 2	COA; Ret	VIR; 6	PET; 10			3rd	105	

^{†} Did not finish the race but was classified as his car completed more than 70% of the overall winner's race distance.

=== 24 Hours of Le Mans results ===
Year	Team	Co-drivers	Car	Class	Laps	Pos.	Class pos.
2001	(United States) Saleen-Allen Speedlab	(Austria) Franz Konrad (United States) Terry Borcheller	Saleen S7-R	GTS	246	18th	**3rd**
2002	(United States) Corvette Racing	(Canada) Ron Fellows (United States) Johnny O'Connell	Chevrolet Corvette C5-R	GTS	335	11th	**1st**
2003	(United States) Corvette Racing	(United States) Kelly Collins (United States) Andy Pilgrim	Chevrolet Corvette C5-R	GTS	326	11th	**3rd**
2004	(United States) Corvette Racing	(Monaco) Olivier Beretta (Denmark) Jan Magnussen	Chevrolet Corvette C5-R	GTS	345	6th	**1st**
2005	(United States) Corvette Racing	(Monaco) Olivier Beretta (Denmark) Jan Magnussen	Chevrolet Corvette C6.R	GT1	349	5th	**1st**
2006	(United States) Corvette Racing	(Monaco) Olivier Beretta (Denmark) Jan Magnussen	Chevrolet Corvette C6.R	GT1	355	4th	**1st**
2007	(United States) Corvette Racing	(Monaco) Olivier Beretta (Italy) Max Papis	Chevrolet Corvette C6.R	GT1	22	DNF	DNF
2008	(United States) Corvette Racing	(Monaco) Olivier Beretta (Italy) Max Papis	Chevrolet Corvette C6.R	GT1	341	15th	**3rd**
2009	(United States) Corvette Racing	(Monaco) Olivier Beretta (Switzerland) Marcel Fässler	Chevrolet Corvette C6.R	GT1	311	DNF	DNF
2010	(United States) Corvette Racing	(Monaco) Olivier Beretta (France) Emmanuel Collard	Chevrolet Corvette C6.R	GT2	255	DNF	DNF
2011	(United States) Corvette Racing	(United Kingdom) Richard Westbrook (Denmark) Jan Magnussen	Chevrolet Corvette C6.R	GTE; Pro	211	DNF	DNF
2012	(United States) Corvette Racing	(United Kingdom) Richard Westbrook (United States) Tommy Milner	Chevrolet Corvette C6.R	GTE; Pro	215	NC	NC
2013	(United States) Corvette Racing	(United Kingdom) Richard Westbrook (United States) Tommy Milner	Chevrolet Corvette C6.R	GTE; Pro	309	22nd	7th
2014	(United States) Corvette Racing	(United Kingdom) Richard Westbrook (United States) Tommy Milner	Chevrolet Corvette C7.R	GTE; Pro	333	20th	4th
2015	(United States) Corvette Racing	(United States) Jordan Taylor (United States) Tommy Milner	Chevrolet Corvette C7.R	GTE; Pro	337	17th	**1st**
2016	(United States) Corvette Racing - GM	(United States) Tommy Milner (United States) Jordan Taylor	Chevrolet Corvette C7.R	GTE; Pro	219	DNF	DNF
2017	(United States) Corvette Racing - GM	(United States) Tommy Milner (Switzerland) Marcel Fässler	Chevrolet Corvette C7.R	GTE; Pro	335	24th	8th
2018	(United States) Corvette Racing - GM	(United States) Tommy Milner (Switzerland) Marcel Fässler	Chevrolet Corvette C7.R	GTE; Pro	259	DNF	DNF
2019	(United States) Corvette Racing	(United States) Tommy Milner (Switzerland) Marcel Fässler	Chevrolet Corvette C7.R	GTE; Pro	82	DNF	DNF

=== Complete GT1 World Championship results ===
Year	Team	Car	1	2	3	4	5	6	7	8	9	10	11	12	13	14	15	16	17	18	19	20	Pos.	Pts	Ref
2010	Mad-Croc Racing	Chevrolet Corvette C6.R	ABU; QR	ABU; CR	SIL; QR; 13	SIL; CR; 14	BRN; QR	BRN; CR	PRI; QR; 19	PRI; CR; 19	SPA; QR; 18	SPA; CR; 17	NÜR; QR	NÜR; CR	ALG; QR	ALG; CR	NAV; QR	NAV; CR	INT; QR	INT; CR	SAN; QR	SAN; CR	53rd	0	

=== Complete IMSA SportsCar Championship results ===
(key) (Races in bold indicate pole position) (Races in italics indicate fastest lap)

Year	Team	Class	Make	Engine	1	2	3	4	5	6	7	8	9	10	11	12	Pos.	Points	Ref
2014	Corvette Racing	GTLM	Chevrolet Corvette C7.R	Chevrolet 5.5 V8	DAY; 5	SEB; 6	LBH; 3	LGA; 5	WGL; 4	MOS; 6	IMS; 5	ELK; 7	VIR; 9	COA; 10	PET; 4		10th	291	
2015	Corvette Racing	GTLM	Chevrolet Corvette C7.R	Chevrolet 5.5 V8	**DAY**; 3	SEB; 9	LBH; 7	LGA; 6	WGL; 7	MOS; 5	ELK; 7	VIR; 8	COA; 8	PET; 3			8th	261	
2016	Corvette Racing	GTLM	Chevrolet Corvette C7.R	Chevrolet 5.5 V8	DAY; 1	SEB; 1	LBH; 2	LGA; 7	WGL; 4	MOS; 2	LIM; 1	ELK; 1	VIR; 9	COA; 5	PET; 3		1st	345	
2017	Corvette Racing	GTLM	Chevrolet Corvette C7.R	Chevrolet LT5.5 5.5 V8	DAY; 9	SEB; 10	LBH; 1	COA; 7	WGL; 5	MOS; 8	LIM; 8	ELK; 5	VIR; 6	LGA; 9	PET; 4		8th	276	
2018	Corvette Racing	GTLM	Chevrolet Corvette C7.R	Chevrolet LT5.5 5.5 V8	DAY; 4	SEB; 6	LBH; 1	MOH; 8	WGL; 5	MOS; 3	LIM; 4	ELK; 2	VIR; 6	**LGA**; 5	PET; 2		3rd	310	
2019	Corvette Racing	GTLM	Chevrolet Corvette C7.R	Chevrolet LT5.5 5.5 V8	DAY; 8	SEB; 8	LBH; 3	MDO; 8	WGL; 8	MOS; 8	LIM; 6	**ELK**; 6	VIR; 4	LGA; 4	PET; 7		8th	275	
2020	Corvette Racing	GTLM	Chevrolet Corvette C8.R	Chevrolet 5.5 L V8	DAY; 7	**DAY**; 5	SEB; 1	ELK; 2	VIR; 4	ATL; 2	MDO; 2	CLT; 4	PET; 4	LGA; 6	SEB; 6		3rd	315	
2021	Vasser Sullivan Racing	GTD	Lexus RC F GT3	Lexus 5.0 L V8	DAY; 16	SEB	MDO	DET	WGL	WGL	LIM	ELK	LGA	LBH	VIR	PET	71st	178	

=== Bathurst 1000 results ===
Year	Team	Car	Co-driver	Position	Laps	Ref
2014	James Rosenberg Racing	Holden Commodore VF	(Australia) Nick Percat	**3rd**	161	
2015	Lucas Dumbrell Motorsport	Holden Commodore VF	(Australia) Nick Percat	19th	159	

Sporting positions
Preceded by Jan Magnussen	British Formula Three Champion; 1995	Succeeded by Ralph Firman
Preceded by Unknown	F1 Safety Car Driver; 1997–1999	Succeeded by Bernd Mayländer
Preceded by Patrick Pilet	WeatherTech SportsCar Championship; GTLM Champion; 2016; With: Tommy Milner	Succeeded by Antonio García; Jan Magnussen
Preceded by Antonio García; Jan Magnussen	North American Endurance Cup; GTLM Champion; 2016; With: Tommy Milner	Succeeded by Patrick Pilet; Dirk Werner
Awards
Preceded by Gareth Rees	McLaren Autosport BRDC Award; 1991	Succeeded by Dario Franchitti
Preceded by Kelvin Burt	Autosport; British Club Driver of the Year; 1992	Succeeded by Dario Franchitti
