= Andy Pilgrim =

American racing driver

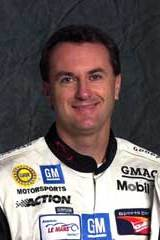
- Pilgrim in 2000
- Nationality: (United Kingdom) British (United States) American (since 1998) via dual nationality
- Born: Andrew Thomas Pilgrim; 18 August 1956 (age 70) Nottingham, England
- Achievements: 2005 SPEED World Challenge GT champion

NASCAR Cup Series career
- 1 race run over 1 year
- Best finish: 47th (2011)
- First race: 2011 Toyota/Save Mart 350 (Infineon)
Wins	Top tens	Poles
0	0	0

NASCAR O'Reilly Auto Parts Series career
- 2 races run over 1 year
- Best finish: 97th (2007)
- First race: 2007 NAPA Auto Parts 200 (Montreal)
- Last race: 2007 Zippo 200 at the Glen (Watkins Glen)
Wins	Top tens	Poles
0	0	0

24 Hours of Le Mans career
- Years: 1996–1997, 2000–2003
- Teams: New Hardware Racing, Roock Racing, Corvette Racing
- Best finish: 10th (1997, 2000)

Andrew Thomas Pilgrim (born 18 August 1956) is a British-born, American-naturalised racing driver. A late bloomer in his forties, he served as Corvette factory driver in the American Le Mans Series from 1999 to 2003, and won the 24 Hours of Daytona overall in 2004. He later competed in the SCCA World Challenge and NASCAR.

== Racing career ==
Having taken a keen interest in motorcycles as a child, Pilgrim started racing them as soon as he started a full-time job (computer programmer). He raced them from 1978 to 1980, finishing second in two National Championships (Avon/Bike Magazine Series & Kawasaki 400 Series) & won several Club championships in just two and a half seasons. He accepted a job offer in the USA towards the end of 1980.

Pilgrim was living in England when his job as a computer programmer necessitated a move to the United States. His first foray into racing stateside was with SCCA Autocross. In 1984, Pilgrim borrowed $3,000 to buy a Renault Alliance and began competing with it. He eventually moved up to professional racing in 1986 running racing a Firebird in the Firehawk Series. In the late 1980s and early 1990s, Pilgrim ran in the Corvette Challenge series.

Pilgrim made appearances in the 24 Hours of Le Mans in the late 1990s, running for New Hardware Racing, Roock Racing and Corvette Racing. He joined the Chevrolet Corvette factory team in 1999. In 2001, he was selected as teammate for Dale Earnhardt Jr., Dale Earnhardt Sr. and Kelly Collins in the 24 Hours of Daytona and the team finished second in class. After the 24 Hours of Daytona, Earnhardt Sr. promised to someday put Pilgrim in a NASCAR stock-car, a promise he was unable to fulfill due to his death a few weeks later during the 2001 Daytona 500. Pilgrim is the last person to have engaged in conversation with Earnhardt before he died.

Pilgrim became a United States citizen in 1998.

From 2004 to 2008, Pilgrim drove for Cadillac in the SPEED World Challenge, winning a championship in 2005. He moved to K-Pax Racing in 2009 and 2010 before returning to Cadillac for another stint that lasted from 2011 to 2014. In 2015, he stepped away from the PWC to run various endurance races. In 2016, Pilgrim joined Black Swan Racing for a four-race endurance schedule, including the 24 Hours of Daytona. The move came after his FIA rating was changed from gold to silver. Pilgrim returned to the World Challenge in 2018 with Blackdog Speed Shop.

In 2007, Pilgrim drove two road course races in the NASCAR Busch Series for JR Motorsports. Pilgrim made his NASCAR Sprint Cup Series debut in 2011 at Infineon Raceway driving the No. 46 for Whitney Motorsports, where he finished 26th.

== Personal life ==
Pilgrim operates a traffic safety foundation.

== Motorsports career results ==
=== SCCA National Championship Runoffs ===
SCCA National Championship Runoffs
Year	Track	Car	Engine	Class	Finish	Start	Status
1985	Road Atlanta	Ford Mustang		SSGT	6	9	Running

=== 24 Hours of Le Mans results ===
Year	Team	Co-Drivers	Car	Class	Laps	Pos.	Class Pos.
1996	(New Zealand) New Hardware Racing (United Kingdom) Parr Motorsport	(Monaco) Stéphane Ortelli (New Zealand) Andrew Bagnall	Porsche 911 GT2	GT2	299	17th	4th
1997	(Germany) Roock Racing	(Germany) André Ahrlé (Switzerland) Bruno Eichmann	Porsche 911 GT2	GT2	306	10th	**2nd**
2000	(United States) Corvette Racing	(France) Franck Fréon (United States) Kelly Collins	Chevrolet Corvette C5-R	GTS	327	10th	**3rd**
2001	(United States) Corvette Racing	(France) Franck Fréon (United States) Kelly Collins	Chevrolet Corvette C5-R	GTS	271	14th	**2nd**
2002	(United States) Corvette Racing	(France) Franck Fréon (United States) Kelly Collins	Chevrolet Corvette C5-R	GTS	331	13th	**2nd**
2003	(United States) Corvette Racing	(United Kingdom) Oliver Gavin (United States) Kelly Collins	Chevrolet Corvette C5-R	GTS	326	11th	**2nd**

=== NASCAR ===
(key) (Bold – Pole position awarded by qualifying time. Italics – Pole position earned by points standings or practice time. * – Most laps led.)

==== Sprint Cup Series ====
NASCAR Sprint Cup Series results
Year	Team	No.	Make	1	2	3	4	5	6	7	8	9	10	11	12	13	14	15	16	17	18	19	20	21	22	23	24	25	26	27	28	29	30	31	32	33	34	35	36	NSCC	Pts	Ref
2011	Whitney Motorsports	46	Chevy	DAY	PHO	LVS	BRI	CAL	MAR	TEX	TAL	RCH	DAR	DOV	CLT	KAN	POC	MCH	SON; 26	DAY	KEN	NHA	IND	POC	GLN	MCH	BRI	ATL	RCH	CHI	NHA	DOV	KAN	CLT	TAL	MAR	TEX	PHO	HOM	47th	18	

==== Busch Series ====
NASCAR Busch Series results
Year	Team	No.	Make	1	2	3	4	5	6	7	8	9	10	11	12	13	14	15	16	17	18	19	20	21	22	23	24	25	26	27	28	29	30	31	32	33	34	35	NBSC	Pts	Ref
2007	JR Motorsports	88	Chevy	DAY	CAL	MXC	LVS	ATL	BRI	NSH	TEX	PHO	TAL	RCH	DAR	CLT	DOV	NSH	KEN	MLW	NHA	DAY	CHI	GTY	IRP	CGV; 15	GLN; 15	MCH	BRI	CAL	RCH	DOV	KAN	CLT	MEM	TEX	PHO	HOM	97th	236	

=== Complete American Le Mans Series results ===
(key) (Races in bold indicate pole position) (Races in italics indicate fastest lap)

Year	Team	Class	Make	Engine	1	2	3	4	5	6	7	8	9	10	11	12	Pos.	Pts	Ref
1999	Riley & Scott Inc.	GTS	Chevrolet Corvette C5-R	Chevrolet 6.0 L V8	SEB; Ret														
1999	Corvette Racing	GTS	Chevrolet Corvette C5-R	Chevrolet 6.0 L V8						PET; 4	MON	LSV							
1999	Chiefie Motorsports	GTS	Porsche 911 GT2	Porsche 3.6 L Turbo Flat-6		ATL; 7	MOS; Ret												
1999	Champion Racing	LMP	Porsche 911 GT1 Evo	Porsche 3.6 L Turbo Flat-6				SON; 12	POR; 8										
2000	Corvette Racing	GTS	Chevrolet Corvette C5-R	Chevrolet 7.0 L V8	SEB; 5	CHA	SIL	NÜR	SON	MOS; 2	TEX; 1	ROS	PET; 1	MON; 2	LSV; Ret	ADE			
2001	Corvette Racing	GTS	Chevrolet Corvette C5-R	Chevrolet 7.0 L V8	TEX; Ret	SEB; 2	DON	JAR	SON; 2	POR; DSQ	MOS; 2	MID; 2	MON; 3	PET; 1			5th	153	
2002	Corvette Racing	GTS	Chevrolet Corvette C5-R	Chevrolet 7.0 L V8	SEB; 4	SON; 2	MID; 2	AME; 1	WAS; 2	TRO; 1	MOS; 2	MON; 3†	MIA; 2	PET; 3			3rd	225	
2003	Corvette Racing	GTS	Chevrolet Corvette C5-R	Chevrolet 7.0 L V8	SEB; 3†	ATL	SON	TRO	MOS	AME	MON	MIA	PET; 3						
2007	Pratt & Miller	GT1	Chevrolet Corvette C6.R	Chevrolet LS7.R 7.0 L V8	SEB	STP	LNB	TEX	UTA	LIM	MID	AME	MOS; 3	DET	PET	MON	13th	13	
2008	Black Swan Racing	GT2	Ford GT-R Mk.VII	Ford (Roush-Yates) 5.0 L V8	SEB	STP	LBH	UTA	LRP	MDO	ELK	MOS	DET	PET; 11	LAG; 9		53rd	7	
2010	GMG Racing	GTC	Porsche 911 GT3 Cup	Porsche 3.8L Flat-6	SEB; 7	LBH	LAG	UTA	LRP	MDO	ELK	MOS	PET				25th	14	

^{†} Did not finish the race but was classified as his car completed more than 70% of the overall winner's race distance.

=== Complete IMSA SportsCar Championship results ===
(key) (Races in bold indicate pole position) (Races in italics indicate fastest lap)

Year	Team	Class	Make	Engine	1	2	3	4	5	6	7	8	9	10	11	Pos.	Pts	Ref
2016	Black Swan Racing	GTD	Porsche 911 GT3 R	Porsche 4.0L Flat-6	DAY; 2	SEB; 13	LGA	BEL	WGL; 7†	MOS	LIM; 12	ELK	VIR	AUS	PET	22nd	73	

^{†} Pilgrim did not complete sufficient laps in order to score full points.
