= Max Angelelli =

Italian racecar driver

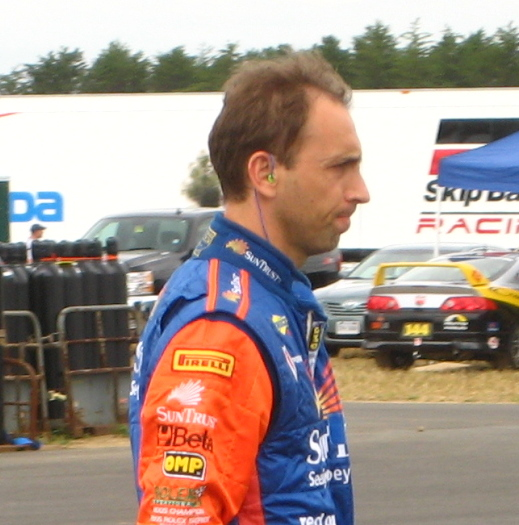
- Angelelli in 2008
- Nationality: (Italy) Italian
- Born: Massimiliano Angelelli; 15 December 1966 (age 59) Bologna, Italy
- Categorisation: FIA Gold (until 2016); FIA Silver (2017–2021); FIA Bronze (2022–)

24 Hours of Le Mans career
- Years: 1994, 1999–2002
- Best finish: 9th (2002)

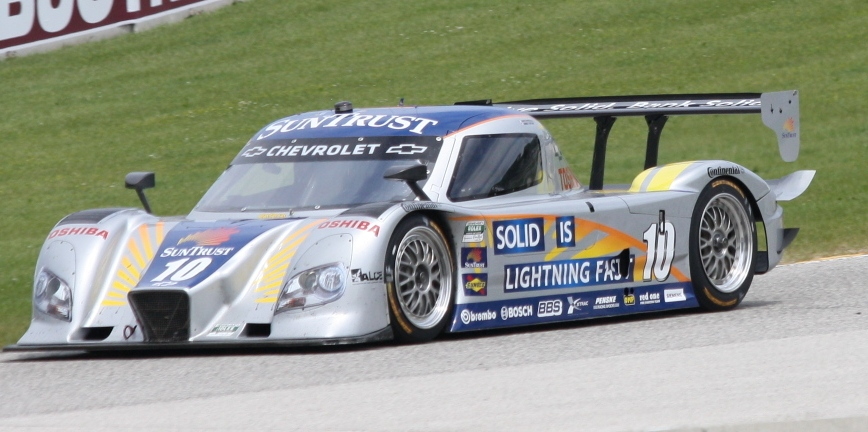
2011 Daytona Prototype with Ricky Taylor

Massimiliano Angelelli (born 15 December 1966) is a retired Italian racecar driver. He won the 2005 and 2017 24 Hours of Daytona and the 2001 Six Hours at the Glen. He was also the Grand-Am Rolex Sports Car Series champion in 2005 and 2013, as well as runner-up in 2010 and 2011.

Angelelli was co-founder of Wayne Taylor Racing, where he drove until his retirement in 2017. In 2020, he left WTR and began working at sports prototype projects for Italian manufacturer Dallara.

== Career ==
Angelelli's career began in Italian Formula Alfa Boxer in 1987 and continued for fifteen years. His only championship win was the 1992 Italian Formula Three title. Following that win he also raced German Formula Three (1993–1995), Macau Grand Prix for Formula 3 (1996), FIA GT Championship (1997–1998), All Japan Grand Touring Car Championship (select races in 1998), and American Le Mans Series (1999–2002).

Angelelli is nicknamed the Axe, coined by Leigh Diffey because he has a knack of closing up and "chopping" off seconds behind the leader quickly in a race to set himself up to make a clean pass for the win.

Angelelli had a banner year in 2005. Angelelli and teammate Wayne Taylor won the 24 Hours of Daytona and captured the 2005 Grand American Daytona Prototype championship.

Angelelli was selected to run in the 2006 IROC series in America, along with teammate Wayne Taylor, becoming the first tandem in IROC history.

Angelelli is also known for being the safety car driver in the 1994 San Marino Grand Prix. Ayrton Senna followed Angelelli's safety car for five laps before his fatal accident.

For the past several years, Angelelli has driven for the Wayne Taylor Sun Trust Racing Team in the Daytona Prototype class of the Grand Am Racing Series, a class that requires two drivers per car. He has teamed up with Ricky Taylor, the son of team owner Wayne Taylor.

For 2013, Angelelli was again with Wayne Taylor Racing/Velocity Worldwide but Taylor's son Ricky had left to pursue another driving opportunity. This left a driver vacancy on the team which was quickly filled by Taylor's younger son Jordan. Together, Jordan and Angelelli made a potent combination and won the final Grand-Am Driver's Title, narrowly beating Scott Pruett and Memo Rojas who had won the championship four of the previous five years.

In 2017, Angelelli announced that he would compete in his last career 24 Hours of Daytona for Wayne Taylor Racing alongside the Taylor brothers and Jeff Gordon. The team went on to win the race.

== Motorsports career results ==
=== 24 Hours of Le Mans results ===
Year	Team	Co-Drivers	Car	Class	Laps	Pos.	Class Pos.
1994	(Sweden) Strandell (Germany) Obermaier Racing	(Sweden) Anders Olofsson (Switzerland) Sandro Angelastro	Ferrari F40	GT1	51	DNF	DNF
1999	(United States) Panoz Motorsports	(United States) Johnny O'Connell (Denmark) Jan Magnussen	Panoz LMP-1 Roadster-S	LMP	323	11th	9th
2000	(United States) Team Cadillac	(South Africa) Wayne Taylor (Belgium) Eric van de Poele	Cadillac Northstar LMP	LMP900	287	22nd	12th
2001	(France) DAMS	(South Africa) Wayne Taylor (France) Christophe Tinseau	Cadillac Northstar LMP01	LMP900	270	15th	5th
2002	(United States) Team Cadillac	(South Africa) Wayne Taylor (France) Christophe Tinseau	Cadillac Northstar LMP02	LMP900	345	9th	8th

=== American Le Mans Series results ===
(key) (Races in bold indicate pole position; results in italics indicate fastest lap)

Year	Team	Class	Make	Engine	1	2	3	4	5	6	7	8	9	10	11	12	Pos.	Points	Ref
1999	Doyle-Risi Racing	LMP	Ferrari 333 SP	Ferrari F310E 4.0 L V12	SEB; 6	ATL; 4	MOS; 5	SON; 10	POR; 9	PET; Ret	MON; Ret	LSV; 8							
2000	Team Cadillac	LMP	Cadillac Northstar LMP	Cadillac Northstar 4.0 L Turbo V8	SEB; 6	CHA	SIL	NÜR	SON	MOS	TEX	ROS; 8	PET; 7	MON; 7	LSV	ADE	22nd	62	
2001	Team Cadillac	LMP900	Cadillac Northstar LMP01	Cadillac Northstar 4.0 L Turbo V8	TEX	SEB	DON	JAR	SON; Ret	POR	MOS; 4	MID; 7	MON; 4	PET; 4			11th	82	
2002	Team Cadillac	LMP900	Cadillac Northstar LMP02	Cadillac Northstar 4.0 L Turbo V8	SEB; 11	SON	MID	AME	WAS; 4	TRO	MOS; 3	MON; 3	MIA; 2	PET; 3			11th	118	

Grand-Am Rolex Sports Car Series results

(key) (Races in bold indicate pole position; results in italics indicate fastest lap)

Year	Team	Class	Chassis	Engine	1	2	3	4	5	6	7	8	9	10	11	12	13	14	Rank	Points	Ref
2004	SunTrust Racing	DP	Riley Mk XI	Pontiac LS6 5.5 L V8	DAY; 5	MIA; 5	PHX; 1	MT; 13	WGL; 2	DAY; 1	MOH; 8	WGL; 3	MIA; 2	VIR; 1	BAR; 2	CAL; 4			4th	329	
2005	SunTrust Racing	DP	Riley Mk XI	Pontiac 5.0 L V8	DAY; 1	MIA; 1	CAL; 2	LGA; 4	MON; 6	WGL; 6	DAY; 2	BAR; 1	WGL; 1	MOH; 3	PHO; 2	WGL; 1	VIR; 4	MEX; 2	1st	439	
2006	SunTrust Racing	DP	Riley Mk XI	Pontiac 5.0 L V8	DAY; 29	MEX; 9	MIA; 11	LBH; 8	VIR; 2	LGA; 1	PHO; 4	WGL; 3	MOH; 4	DAY; 4	BAR; 2	WGL; 2	SON; 4	MIL; 14	3rd	431	
2007	SunTrust Racing	DP	Riley Mk XI	Pontiac 5.0 L V8	R24; 3	MEX; 3	HOM; 2	VIR; 1	LGA; 15	S6H; 3	MOH; 4	DAY; 2	IOW; 7	BAR; 3	MON; 1	WGL; 2	SON; 4	SLK; 18	3rd	395	
2008	SunTrust Racing	DP	Dallara DP01	Pontiac 5.0 L V8	DAY; 5	MIA; 14	MEX; 18	VIR; 17	LGA; 8	**WGL**; **3**	LEX; 10	DAY; 20	BAR; 6	MON; 6	WGL; 7	SON; 1	NJ; 2	MIL; 2	6th	328	
2009	SunTrust Racing	DP	Dallara DP01	Ford 5.0L V8	R24; 4	VIR; 13	NJ; 2	LAG; 3	S6H; 2	LEX; 8	DAY; 1	BAR; 14	WGI; 12	MON; 1	MIL; 2	HOM; 7			3rd	325	
2010	SunTrust Racing	DP	Dallara DP08	Ford 5.0L V8	R24; 6	HOM; 6	BIR; 12	VIR; 3	LRP; 1	S6H; 2	LEX; 9	DAY; 9	NJ; 3	WAT; 2	MON; 3	SLK; 3			2nd	332	
2011	SunTrust Racing	DP	Dallara Corvette DP	Chevrolet 5.5L V8	R24; 5	HOM; 3	BIR; 11	VIR; 4	LIM; 1	S6H; 1	ELK; 3	LAG; 3	NJ; 2	WAT; 1	MON; 2	LEX; 11			2nd	353	
2012	SunTrust Racing	DP	Corvette DP (Dallara DP01)	Chevrolet 5.0L V8	R24; 14	BIR; 5	HOM; 1	NJ; 1	BEL; 20	LEX; 9	ELK; 7	S6H; 11	IMS; 3	WAT; 4	MON; 5	LGA; 7	LIM; 1		6th	343	
2013	Wayne Taylor Racing	DP	Dallara Corvette DP	Chevrolet 5.5L V8	DAY; 2	COA; 10	BAR; 1	ATL; 6	DET; 1	LEX; 6	WGI; 10	IMS; 15	ROA; 7	KAN; 1	LGA; 1	LIM; 1			1st	339	

=== WeatherTech SportsCar Championship results ===
(key)(Races in bold indicate pole position, Results are overall/class)

Year	Team	Make	Engine	Class	1	2	3	4	5	6	7	8	9	10	11	Rank	Points	Ref
2014	Wayne Taylor Racing	P	Dallara Corvette DP	Chevrolet 5.5L V8	DAY; 2	SIR; 7	LBH	LS	DET	S6H; 5	MSP	IMS	ELK	COA	PET; 1	20th	121	
2015	Wayne Taylor Racing	P	Dallara Corvette DP	Chevrolet 5.5L V8	DAY; 16	SIR; 2	LBH	LS	DET	S6H; 6	MSP	ELK	COA	PET; 4		12th	104	
2016	Wayne Taylor Racing	P	Dallara Corvette DP	Chevrolet 5.5L V8	DAY; 2	SIR; 12	LBH	LS	DET	S6H; 4	MSP	ELK	COA	PET; 3		14th	113	
2017	Wayne Taylor Racing	P	Cadillac DPi-V.R	Cadillac 6.2 L V8	DAY; 1	SEB	LBH	COA	DET	WAT	MSP	ELK	LGA	PET		28th	35	

=== International Race of Champions ===
(key) (Bold – Pole position. * – Most laps led.)

International Race of Champions results
Season	Make	1	2	3	4	Pos.	Points	Ref
2006	Pontiac	DAY	TEX; 6	DAY; 7	ATL	9th^{1}	30	

^{1} Ride shared with Wayne Taylor

Sporting positions
Preceded by Giambattista Busi	Italian Formula Three Champion; 1992	Succeeded by Christian Pescatori
Preceded by Philipp Peter	Austria Formula 3 Cup champion 1993	Succeeded by Alexander Wurz
Preceded by Max Papis; Scott Pruett	Rolex Sports Car Series DP Champion; 2005 with: Wayne Taylor	Succeeded by Jörg Bergmeister
Preceded by Memo Rojas; Scott Pruett	Rolex Sports Car Series DP Champion; 2013 with: Jordan Taylor	Succeeded by João Barbosa; Christian Fittipaldi; United SportsCar Championship Prototype (post-merger)
