= Klaus Graf =

German racing driver

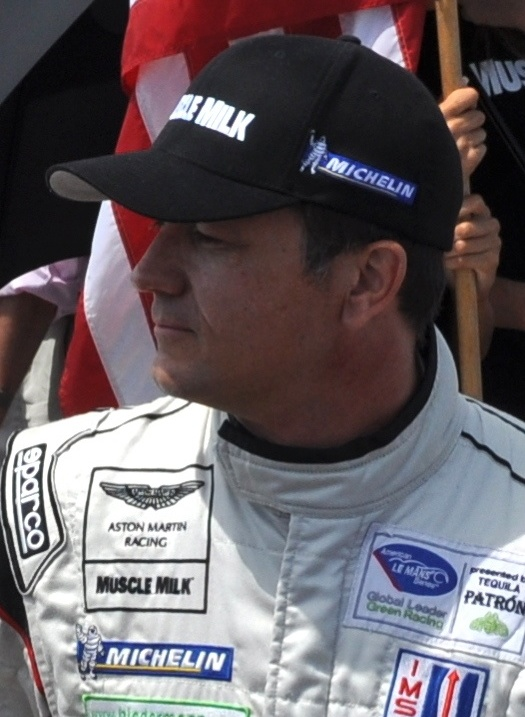
- Graf at the Grand Prix of Mosport in 2011
- Nationality: (Germany) German
- Born: 21 July 1969 (age 57) Dornhan, Germany
- Relatives: Peter Graf (father)

United SportsCar Championship career
- Current team: Muscle Milk Pickett Racing
- Categorisation: FIA Platinum
- Car number: 6
- Engine: Nissan VK45DE 4.5 L V8

Previous series
- 2004: ARCA Re/Max Series

NASCAR Cup Series career
- 1 race run over 1 year
- Best finish: 72nd (2004)
- First race: 2004 Dodge/Save Mart 350 (Infineon)
Wins	Top tens	Poles
0	0	0

24 Hours of Le Mans career
- Years: 2000–2001, 2008
- Teams: Team Den Blå Avis, Panoz Motorsports, Charouz Racing System, Team Cytosport
- Best finish: DNF
- Class wins: 0
- Statistics up to date as of August 9, 2020.

Klaus Graf (born 21 July 1969) is a German professional racing driver. He is the son of rally driver Peter Graf. He lived in the United States while competing in the American Le Mans Series with Muscle Milk Pickett Racing. He resulted LMP1 class champion in 2012 and 2013, and runner-up in 2010 and 2011.

Graf currently works as team principal at Rutronik Racing.

== Racing career ==
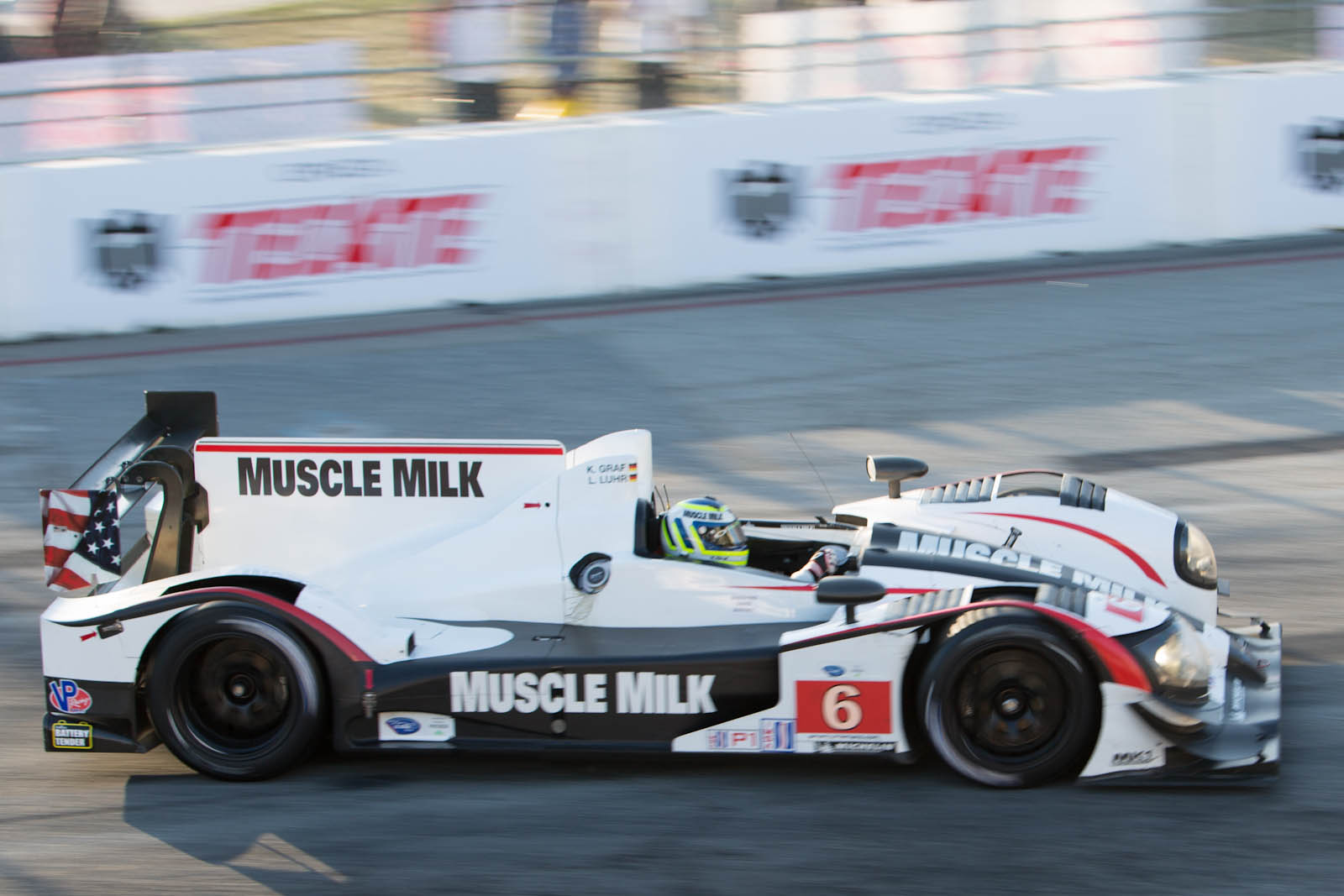
Graf in the American Le Mans Series race at Long Beach in 2012

Born in Dornhan, Graf has won championships and races in several road racing series. In 2004, he raced part-time in NASCAR Nextel Cup for BAM Racing. He competed in one race at Infineon Raceway finishing seventeenth; however, he attempted two other races during the year. He attempted eight races for the same team in 2007 but did not qualify for any of them. In 2005, he won the Trans-Am Series Driver's Championship, becoming the first Trans Am champion born outside the United States since David Hobbs in 1983.

Graf raced for Muscle Milk Pickett Racing in the American Le Mans Series. His best finishes in the 2010 season were an LMP2 class win at the 12 Hours of Sebring sharing with team owner Greg Pickett and Sascha Maassen, and overall race wins (and LMP class) at the Northeast Grand Prix sharing with Pickett, and at the Grand Prix of Mosport sharing with Romain Dumas.

In 2011, Graf collected further victories at Long Beach, Mosport, Mid-Ohio and Road America in the team's Lola-Aston Martin. For 2012, Graf returned to the team and drove together with Lucas Luhr in a new HPD ARX-03a for the entire ALMS season.

Graf won the 2012 and 2013 ALMS LMP1 driver's championships with codriver Lucas Luhr.

== Racing record ==
=== American Le Mans Series/United Sports Car Championship results ===
(key) (Races in bold indicate pole position; results in italics indicate fastest lap)

Year	Team	Class	Make	Engine	1	2	3	4	5	6	7	8	9	10	11	12	Pos.	Points	Ref
1999	J&P Motorsports	LMP	Panoz LMP-1 Roadster-S	Élan 6L8 6.0L V8	SEB	ATL	MOS	SON	POR	PET; 9	MON	LSV							
2000	Panoz Motor Sports	LMP	Panoz LMP-1 Roadster-S	Élan 6L8 6.0L V8	SEB	CHA	SIL	NÜR; 4	SON	MOS	TEX	ROS	PET; 4	MON	LSV	ADE; Ret	28th	44	
2001	Panoz Motor Sports	LMP900	Panoz LMP-1 Roadster-S	Élan 6L8 6.0L V8	TEX; 5				SON; Ret	POR; 4	MOS; Ret	MID; 6	MON; Ret	PET; Ret			14th	79	
2001	Panoz Motor Sports	LMP900	Panoz LMP07	Élan (Zytek) 4.0L V8		SEB; Ret	DON; 6	JAR; 4									14th	79	
2006	Alex Job Racing	GT2	Porsche 911 GT3-RSR	Porsche 3.6 L Flat-6	SEB; 6	TEX; 1	MID; Ret	LIM; 9	UTA; 4	POR	AME	MOS	PET	MON			20th	44	
2007	Team Cytosport	LMP1	Lola B06/10	AER P32T 4.0L Turbo V8	SEB	STP	LNB; DNS	TEX	UTA	LIM	MID	AME	MOS	DET	PET; 4	MON; Ret	9th	72	
2009	Team Cytosport	LMP2	Porsche RS Spyder Evo	Porsche MR6 3.4 L V8	SEB	STP	LBH	UTA	LRP	MDO; 2	ELK; 3	MOS	PET; 3	LAG; 2†			5th	73	
2010	Muscle Milk Team Cytosport	LMP2	Porsche RS Spyder Evo	Porsche MR6 3.4 L V8	SEB; 1								PET; 2				2nd	162	
2010	Muscle Milk Team Cytosport	LMP	Porsche RS Spyder Evo	Porsche MR6 3.4 L V8		LBH; 3	MON; 2	UTA; 3	LIM; 1	MDO; DNS	ROA; 2	**MOS**; 1					2nd	162	
2011	Muscle Milk Aston Martin Racing	LMP1	Lola-Aston Martin B08/62	Aston Martin 6.0 L V12	SEB; Ret	LBH; 1	LRP; 2	**MOS**; 1	MDO; 1	**ELK**; 1	BAL; 4	LAG; 5	PET; Ret				2nd	124	
2012	Muscle Milk Pickett Racing	P1	HPD ARX-03a	Honda LM-V8 3.4 L V8	SEB; 8†	LBH; 1	**LAG**; 1	LRP; 1	MOS; 1	MDO; 1	ELK; 2	BAL; 3†	VIR; 1	PET; 3			1st	195	
2013	Muscle Milk Pickett Racing	P1	HPD ARX-03a	Honda LM-V8 3.4 L V8	SEB; 4	LBH; 1	LAG; 1										1st	182	
2013	Muscle Milk Pickett Racing	P1	HPD ARX-03c	Honda LM-V8 3.4 L V8				**LRP**; 1	**MOS**; 1	ELK; 1	BAL; 1	COA; 1	VIR; 1	PET; Ret			1st	182	
2014	Muscle Milk Pickett Racing	P	Oreca 03	Nissan VK45DE 4.5 L V8	DAY; 5	SEB; 13	LBH	LAG	DET	WGL	MOS	IMS	ROA	COA	PET		36th	46	

^{†} Did not finish the race but was classified as his car completed more than 70% of the overall winner's race distance.

=== 24 Hours of Le Mans results ===
Year	Team	Co-Drivers	Car	Class	Laps	Pos.	Class Pos.
2000	(Denmark) Team Den Blå Avis	(Denmark) John Nielsen (Italy) Mauro Baldi	Panoz LMP-1 Roadster-S-Élan	LMP900	205	NC	NC
2001	(United States) Panoz Motorsports	(United Kingdom) Jamie Davies (South Africa) Gary Formato	Panoz LMP07-Élan	LMP900	86	DNF	DNF
2008	(Czech Republic) Charouz Racing System (United States) Team Cytosport	(United States) Greg Pickett (Netherlands) Jan Lammers	Lola B07/17-Judd	LMP1	146	DNF	DNF

=== Complete Porsche Supercup results ===
(key) (Races in bold indicate pole position) (Races in italics indicate fastest lap)

Year	Team	Car	1	2	3	4	5	6	7	8	9	10	11	12	DC	Points
2003	Tolimit Motorsport	Porsche 996 GT3	ITA	ESP; 4	AUT; 6	MON; 14†	GER; 7	FRA	GBR	GER; 2	HUN	ITA; Ret			8th	73
2003	Walter Lechner Racing School Team	Porsche 996 GT3											USA; Ret	USA; 8	8th	73
2004	Tolimit Motorsport	Porsche 996 GT3	ITA; 8	ESP; 2	MON; 10	GER; 3	USA; Ret	USA; 5	FRA; Ret	GBR; 18†	GER	HUN	BEL	ITA; 3	9th	86
2005	Tolimit Motorsport	Porsche 997 GT3	ITA	ESP	MON	GER; 7	USA	USA	FRA	GBR	GER	HUN	ITA	BEL	NC‡	0‡

† — Did not finish the race, but was classified as he completed over 90% of the race distance.

‡ — Guest driver – Not eligible for points.

=== NASCAR ===
(key) (Bold – Pole position awarded by qualifying time. Italics – Pole position earned by points standings or practice time. * – Most laps led.)

==== Nextel Cup Series ====
NASCAR Nextel Cup Series results
Year	Team	No.	Make	1	2	3	4	5	6	7	8	9	10	11	12	13	14	15	16	17	18	19	20	21	22	23	24	25	26	27	28	29	30	31	32	33	34	35	36	NNCC	Pts	Ref
2004	BAM Racing	59	Dodge	DAY	CAR	LVS	ATL	DAR	BRI	TEX	MAR	TAL	CAL	RCH	CLT	DOV	POC	MCH	SON; 17	DAY	CHI	NHA	POC	IND	GLN; DNQ	MCH	BRI	CAL	RCH	NHA	DOV	TAL	KAN	CLT	MAR; DNQ	ATL	PHO	DAR	HOM	72nd	112	
2007	BAM Racing	49	Dodge	DAY	CAL	LVS	ATL	BRI	MAR	TEX	PHO	TAL	RCH	DAR	CLT	DOV	POC	MCH	SON; DNQ	NHA	DAY	CHI	IND	POC	GLN; DNQ	MCH	BRI	CAL	RCH	NHA	DOV	KAN	TAL	CLT	MAR	ATL	TEX	PHO	HOM	N/A	0	

=== ARCA Re/Max Series ===
(key) (Bold – Pole position awarded by qualifying time. Italics – Pole position earned by points standings or practice time. * – Most laps led.)

ARCA Re/Max Series results
Year	Team	No.	Make	1	2	3	4	5	6	7	8	9	10	11	12	13	14	15	16	17	18	19	20	21	22	ARMC	Pts	Ref
2004	BAM Racing	69	Dodge	DAY	NSH; 3	SLM	KEN	TOL	CLT	KAN	POC	MCH	SBO	BLN	KEN	GTW	POC	LER	NSH	ISF	TOL	DSF	CHI	SLM		81st	310	
2004	BAM Racing	99	Dodge																						TAL; 29	81st	310	

Sporting positions
Preceded by Chris Dyson; Guy Smith	American Le Mans Series champion 2012-2013 with Lucas Luhr	Succeeded by End Series
