= 2001 Monterey Sports Car Championships =

Track map of Laguna Seca Raceway

The 2001 Monterey Sports Car Championships presented by Mazda was the ninth round of the 2001 American Le Mans Series season. It took place at Laguna Seca Raceway, California, on September 9, 2001.

== Official results ==
Class winners in bold.

Pos	Class	No	Team	Drivers	Chassis	Tyre	Laps
Pos	Class	No	Team	Drivers	Engine	Tyre	Laps
1	**LMP900**	**2**	**(Germany) Audi Sport North America**	**(Germany) Frank Biela (Italy) Emanuele Pirro**	**Audi R8**	M	**120**
1	**LMP900**	**2**	**(Germany) Audi Sport North America**	**(Germany) Frank Biela (Italy) Emanuele Pirro**	**Audi 3.6L Turbo V8**	M	**120**
2	LMP900	38	(United States) Champion Racing	(United Kingdom) Andy Wallace (United Kingdom) Johnny Herbert	Audi R8	M	120
2	LMP900	38	(United States) Champion Racing	(United Kingdom) Andy Wallace (United Kingdom) Johnny Herbert	Audi 3.6L Turbo V8	M	120
3	LMP900	18	(United Kingdom) Johansson Motorsport (United Kingdom) Arena Motorsport	(Sweden) Stefan Johansson (France) Patrick Lemarié	Audi R8	M	119
3	LMP900	18	(United Kingdom) Johansson Motorsport (United Kingdom) Arena Motorsport	(Sweden) Stefan Johansson (France) Patrick Lemarié	Audi 3.6L Turbo V8	M	119
4	LMP900	8	(United States) Team Cadillac	(South Africa) Wayne Taylor (Italy) Max Angelelli	Cadillac Northstar LMP01	M	117
4	LMP900	8	(United States) Team Cadillac	(South Africa) Wayne Taylor (Italy) Max Angelelli	Cadillac Northstart 4.0L Turbo V8	M	117
5	LMP900	7	(United States) Team Cadillac	(France) Emmanuel Collard (France) Christophe Tinseau	Cadillac Northstar LMP01	M	116
5	LMP900	7	(United States) Team Cadillac	(France) Emmanuel Collard (France) Christophe Tinseau	Cadillac Northstar 4.0L Turbo V8	M	116
6	**GTS**	**26**	**(Germany) Konrad Team Saleen**	**(United States) Terry Borcheller (Austria) Franz Konrad**	**Saleen S7-R**	G	**112**
6	**GTS**	**26**	**(Germany) Konrad Team Saleen**	**(United States) Terry Borcheller (Austria) Franz Konrad**	**Ford 7.0L V8**	G	**112**
7	GTS	3	(United States) Corvette Racing	(Canada) Ron Fellows (United States) Johnny O'Connell	Chevrolet Corvette C5-R	G	111
7	GTS	3	(United States) Corvette Racing	(Canada) Ron Fellows (United States) Johnny O'Connell	Chevrolet 7.0L V8	G	111
8	GTS	4	(United States) Corvette Racing	(United States) Andy Pilgrim (United States) Kelly Collins	Chevrolet Corvette C5-R	G	111
8	GTS	4	(United States) Corvette Racing	(United States) Andy Pilgrim (United States) Kelly Collins	Chevrolet 7.0L V8	G	111
9	**GT**	**42**	**(Germany) BMW Motorsport (Germany) Schnitzer Motorsport**	**(Germany) Jörg Müller (Finland) JJ Lehto**	**BMW M3 GTR**	M	**110**
9	**GT**	**42**	**(Germany) BMW Motorsport (Germany) Schnitzer Motorsport**	**(Germany) Jörg Müller (Finland) JJ Lehto**	**BMW 4.0L V8**	M	**110**
10	GT	43	(Germany) BMW Motorsport (Germany) Schnitzer Motorsport	(Germany) Dirk Müller (Sweden) Fredrik Ekblom	BMW M3 GTR	M	110
10	GT	43	(Germany) BMW Motorsport (Germany) Schnitzer Motorsport	(Germany) Dirk Müller (Sweden) Fredrik Ekblom	BMW 3.2L I6	M	110
11	GT	23	(United States) Alex Job Racing	(Germany) Lucas Luhr (Germany) Sascha Maassen	Porsche 911 GT3-RS	M	110
11	GT	23	(United States) Alex Job Racing	(Germany) Lucas Luhr (Germany) Sascha Maassen	Porsche 3.6L Flat-6	M	110
12	GT	10	(United States) Prototype Technology Group	(United States) Boris Said (Sweden) Bill Auberlen	BMW M3 GTR	Y	109
12	GT	10	(United States) Prototype Technology Group	(United States) Boris Said (Sweden) Bill Auberlen	BMW 4.0L V8	Y	109
13	GT	30	(United States) Petersen Motorsports	(United Kingdom) Johnny Mowlem (Germany) Timo Bernhard	Porsche 911 GT3-R	M	109
13	GT	30	(United States) Petersen Motorsports	(United Kingdom) Johnny Mowlem (Germany) Timo Bernhard	Porsche 3.6L Flat-6	M	109
14	GT	22	(United States) Alex Job Racing	(United States) Randy Pobst (Germany) Christian Menzel	Porsche 911 GT3-RS	M	108
14	GT	22	(United States) Alex Job Racing	(United States) Randy Pobst (Germany) Christian Menzel	Porsche 3.6L Flat-6	M	108
15	GT	66	(United States) The Racer's Group	(United States) Kevin Buckler (United States) Tyler McQuarre	Porsche 911 GT3-RS	Y	105
15	GT	66	(United States) The Racer's Group	(United States) Kevin Buckler (United States) Tyler McQuarre	Porsche 3.6L Flat-6	Y	105
16	GT	67	(United States) The Racer's Group	(United States) Robert Orcutt (United States) Tony Colicchio	Porsche 911 GT3-R	Y	103
16	GT	67	(United States) The Racer's Group	(United States) Robert Orcutt (United States) Tony Colicchio	Porsche 3.6L Flat-6	Y	103
17	GT	69	(Canada) Kyser Racing	(Canada) Kye Wankum (United States) Joe Foster	Porsche 911 GT3-R	D	102
17	GT	69	(Canada) Kyser Racing	(Canada) Kye Wankum (United States) Joe Foster	Porsche 3.6L Flat-6	D	102
18	GTS	44	(United States) American Viperacing	(United States) Tom Weickardt (United States) Mike Silcox	Dodge Viper GTS-R	D	100
18	GTS	44	(United States) American Viperacing	(United States) Tom Weickardt (United States) Mike Silcox	Dodge 8.0L V10	D	100
19	GT	15	(United States) Dick Barbour Racing	(United States) Mark Neuhaus (Mexico) Randy Wars	Porsche 911 GT3-R	D	99
19	GT	15	(United States) Dick Barbour Racing	(United States) Mark Neuhaus (Mexico) Randy Wars	Porsche 3.6L Flat-6	D	99
20 DNF	GTS	45	(United States) American Viperacing	(United States) Shane Lewis (United States) Darren Law	Dodge Viper GTS-R	D	83
20 DNF	GTS	45	(United States) American Viperacing	(United States) Shane Lewis (United States) Darren Law	Dodge 8.0L V10	D	83
21 DNF	LMP900	51	(United States) Panoz Motor Sports	(Germany) Klaus Graf (France) Franck Lagorce	Panoz LMP-1 Roadster-S	M	78
21 DNF	LMP900	51	(United States) Panoz Motor Sports	(Germany) Klaus Graf (France) Franck Lagorce	Élan 6L8 6.0L V8	M	78
22 DNF	LMP900	37	(United States) Intersport	(United States) John Field (United States) Rick Sutherland	Lola B2K/10	G	74
22 DNF	LMP900	37	(United States) Intersport	(United States) John Field (United States) Rick Sutherland	Judd GV4 4.0L V10	G	74
23 DNF	GT	6	(United States) Prototype Technology Group	(Sweden) Niclas Jönsson (Germany) Hans-Joachim Stuck	BMW M3 GTR	Y	74
23 DNF	GT	6	(United States) Prototype Technology Group	(Sweden) Niclas Jönsson (Germany) Hans-Joachim Stuck	BMW 4.0L V8	Y	74
24 DNF	LMP900	1	(Germany) Audi Sport North America	(Italy) Rinaldo Capello (Denmark) Tom Kristensen	Audi R8	M	58
24 DNF	LMP900	1	(Germany) Audi Sport North America	(Italy) Rinaldo Capello (Denmark) Tom Kristensen	Audi 3.6L Turbo V8	M	58
25 DNF	LMP900	50	(United States) Panoz Motor Sports	(Denmark) Jan Magnussen (Australia) David Brabham	Panoz LMP-1 Roadster-S	M	57
25 DNF	LMP900	50	(United States) Panoz Motor Sports	(Denmark) Jan Magnussen (Australia) David Brabham	Élan 6L8 6.0L V8	M	57
26	**LMP675**	**5**	**(United States) Dick Barbour Racing**	**(Venezuela) Milka Duno (Belgium) Didier de Radigues**	**Reynard 01Q**	G	**48**
26	**LMP675**	**5**	**(United States) Dick Barbour Racing**	**(Venezuela) Milka Duno (Belgium) Didier de Radigues**	**Judd GV675 3.4L V8**	G	**48**
27 DNF	LMP675	57	(United States) Dick Barbour Racing	(Canada) John Graham (Canada) Scott Maxwell	Reynard 01Q	G	41
27 DNF	LMP675	57	(United States) Dick Barbour Racing	(Canada) John Graham (Canada) Scott Maxwell	Judd GV675 3.4L V8	G	41
28 DNF	GT	52	(Germany) Seikel Motorsport	(Canada) Tony Burgess (New Zealand) Andrew Bagnall	Porsche 911 GT3-RS	Y	40
28 DNF	GT	52	(Germany) Seikel Motorsport	(Canada) Tony Burgess (New Zealand) Andrew Bagnall	Porsche 3.6L Flat-6	Y	40
29 DNF	LMP675	11	(United States) Roock-KnightHawk Racing	(United States) Steven Knight (Germany) Claudia Hürtgen	Lola B2K/40	A	20
29 DNF	LMP675	11	(United States) Roock-KnightHawk Racing	(United States) Steven Knight (Germany) Claudia Hürtgen	Nissan (AER) VQL 3.4L V6	A	20

== Statistics ==
- Pole Position - #1 Audi Sport North America - 1:15.238
- Fastest Lap - #1 Audi Sport North America - 1:17.011
- Distance - 432.205 km
- Average Speed - 156.843 km/h

American Le Mans Series
Previous race: 2001 Grand Prix of Mid-Ohio	2001 season	Next race: 2001 Petit Le Mans
