= 2001 Grand Prix of Mosport =

Mosport International Raceway

The 2001 Gran Turismo 3 Grand Prix of Mosport was an American Le Mans Series professional sports car race held at Mosport International Raceway near Bowmanville, Ontario, Canada from August 17 to the 19, 2001. It is named after Gran Turismo 3: A-Spec, a racing game released on July 10, 2001, a month prior to this event. It was the seventh round of the 2001 American Le Mans Series season and the 16th IMSA / Professional SportsCar Racing sanctioned sports car race held at the facility.

== Race ==
The overall race victory went to Audi Sport North America drivers Frank Biela and Emanuele Pirro marking the Audi R8's second consecutive win at Mosport. Second place went to Jan Magnussen and David Brabham in the Panoz LMP-1 Roadster-S, with Team Cadillac drivers Emmanuel Collard and Christophe Tinseau picking up the first American Le Mans Series podium for the Cadillac Northstar LMP01.

Dick Barbour Racing took the LMP675 victory with drivers Bruno Lambert and Didier de Radigues in the Reynard 01Q.

Corvette Racing drivers Ron Fellows and Johnny O'Connell drove the Chevrolet Corvette C5-R to the GTS class victory with BMW Schnitzer Motorsport drivers Jörg Müller and JJ Lehto taking the GT win in the BMW M3 GTR.

The race was held under cool and rainy conditions and was broadcast across North America on NBC Sports with Rick Benjamin and Bill Adam calling the race.

== Official results ==
Class winners in bold.

Pos	Class	No	Team	Drivers	Chassis	Tyre	Laps
Pos	Class	No	Team	Drivers	Engine	Tyre	Laps
1	**LMP900**	**2**	**(Germany) Audi Sport North America**	**(Germany) Frank Biela (Italy) Emanuele Pirro**	**Audi R8**	MI	**115**
1	**LMP900**	**2**	**(Germany) Audi Sport North America**	**(Germany) Frank Biela (Italy) Emanuele Pirro**	**Audi 3.6L Turbo V8**	MI	**115**
2	LMP900	50	(United States) Panoz Motor Sports	(Denmark) Jan Magnussen (Australia) David Brabham	Panoz LMP-1 Roadster-S	MI	113
2	LMP900	50	(United States) Panoz Motor Sports	(Denmark) Jan Magnussen (Australia) David Brabham	Élan 6L8 6.0L V8	MI	113
3	LMP900	7	(United States) Team Cadillac	(France) Emmanuel Collard (France) Christophe Tinseau	Cadillac Northstar LMP01	MI	112
3	LMP900	7	(United States) Team Cadillac	(France) Emmanuel Collard (France) Christophe Tinseau	Cadillac Northstar 4.0L Turbo V8	MI	112
4	LMP900	8	(United States) Team Cadillac	(South Africa) Wayne Taylor (Italy) Max Angelelli	Cadillac Northstar LMP01	MI	112
4	LMP900	8	(United States) Team Cadillac	(South Africa) Wayne Taylor (Italy) Max Angelelli	Cadillac Northstart 4.0L Turbo V8	MI	112
5	LMP900	16	(United States) Dyson Racing	(United States) Butch Leitzinger (United Kingdom) James Weaver	Riley & Scott Mk III C	G	112
5	LMP900	16	(United States) Dyson Racing	(United States) Butch Leitzinger (United Kingdom) James Weaver	Lincoln (Élan) 6.0L V8	G	112
6	**LMP675**	**5**	**(United States) Dick Barbour Racing**	**(Belgium) Bruno Lambert (Belgium) Didier de Radigues**	**Reynard 01Q**	G	**111**
6	**LMP675**	**5**	**(United States) Dick Barbour Racing**	**(Belgium) Bruno Lambert (Belgium) Didier de Radigues**	**Judd GV675 3.4L V8**	G	**111**
7	**GTS**	**3**	**(United States) Corvette Racing**	**(Canada) Ron Fellows (United States) Johnny O'Connell**	**Chevrolet Corvette C5-R**	G	**109**
7	**GTS**	**3**	**(United States) Corvette Racing**	**(Canada) Ron Fellows (United States) Johnny O'Connell**	**Chevrolet 7.0L V8**	G	**109**
8	GTS	26	(Germany) Konrad Team Saleen	(United States) Terry Borcheller (Austria) Franz Konrad	Saleen S7-R	G	108
8	GTS	26	(Germany) Konrad Team Saleen	(United States) Terry Borcheller (Austria) Franz Konrad	Ford 7.0L V8	G	108
9	GTS	4	(United States) Corvette Racing	(United States) Andy Pilgrim (United States) Kelly Collins	Chevrolet Corvette C5-R	G	107
9	GTS	4	(United States) Corvette Racing	(United States) Andy Pilgrim (United States) Kelly Collins	Chevrolet 7.0L V8	G	107
10	**GT**	**42**	**(Germany) BMW Motorsport (Germany) Schnitzer Motorsport**	**(Germany) Jörg Müller (Finland) JJ Lehto**	**BMW M3 GTR**	MI	**107**
10	**GT**	**42**	**(Germany) BMW Motorsport (Germany) Schnitzer Motorsport**	**(Germany) Jörg Müller (Finland) JJ Lehto**	**BMW 4.0L V8**	MI	**107**
11	GT	43	(Germany) BMW Motorsport (Germany) Schnitzer Motorsport	(Germany) Dirk Müller (Sweden) Fredrik Ekblom	BMW M3 GTR	MI	107
11	GT	43	(Germany) BMW Motorsport (Germany) Schnitzer Motorsport	(Germany) Dirk Müller (Sweden) Fredrik Ekblom	BMW 4.0L V8	MI	107
12	GT	6	(United States) Prototype Technology Group	(United States) Boris Said (Germany) Hans-Joachim Stuck	BMW M3 GTR	Y	107
12	GT	6	(United States) Prototype Technology Group	(United States) Boris Said (Germany) Hans-Joachim Stuck	BMW 4.0L V8	Y	107
13	GT	23	(United States) Alex Job Racing	(Germany) Lucas Luhr (Germany) Sascha Maassen	Porsche 911 GT3-RS	MI	106
13	GT	23	(United States) Alex Job Racing	(Germany) Lucas Luhr (Germany) Sascha Maassen	Porsche 3.6L Flat-6	MI	106
14 DNF	LMP900	38	(United States) Champion Racing	(United Kingdom) Andy Wallace (United Kingdom) Johnny Herbert	Audi R8	MI	104
14 DNF	LMP900	38	(United States) Champion Racing	(United Kingdom) Andy Wallace (United Kingdom) Johnny Herbert	Audi 3.6L Turbo V8	MI	104
15	GTS	45	(United States) American Viperacing	(United States) Shane Lewis (United States) David Donohue	Dodge Viper GTS-R	D	103
15	GTS	45	(United States) American Viperacing	(United States) Shane Lewis (United States) David Donohue	Dodge 8.0L V10	D	103
16	GT	52	(Germany) Seikel Motorsport	(Canada) Tony Burgess (Sweden) Magnus Wallinder	Porsche 911 GT3-RS	Y	102
16	GT	52	(Germany) Seikel Motorsport	(Canada) Tony Burgess (Sweden) Magnus Wallinder	Porsche 3.6L Flat-6	Y	102
17	GT	69	(Canada) Kyser Racing	(Canada) Kye Wankum (United States) Jeffrey Pabst	Porsche 911 GT3-R	D	96
17	GT	69	(Canada) Kyser Racing	(Canada) Kye Wankum (United States) Jeffrey Pabst	Porsche 3.6L Flat-6	D	96
18	GT	15	(United States) Dick Barbour Racing	(United States) Grady Willingham (Mexico) Randy Wars	Porsche 911 GT3-R	D	95
18	GT	15	(United States) Dick Barbour Racing	(United States) Grady Willingham (Mexico) Randy Wars	Porsche 3.6L Flat-6	D	95
19	LMP675	57	(United States) Dick Barbour Racing	(Canada) John Graham (Venezuela) Milka Duno	Reynard 01Q	G	95
19	LMP675	57	(United States) Dick Barbour Racing	(Canada) John Graham (Venezuela) Milka Duno	Judd GV675 3.4L V8	G	95
20 DNF	GT	22	(United States) Alex Job Racing	(United States) Randy Pobst (Germany) Christian Menzel	Porsche 911 GT3-RS	MI	92
20 DNF	GT	22	(United States) Alex Job Racing	(United States) Randy Pobst (Germany) Christian Menzel	Porsche 3.6L Flat-6	MI	92
21	GTS	44	(United States) American Viperacing	(United States) Tom Weickardt (United States) Kevin Allen	Dodge Viper GTS-R	D	88
21	GTS	44	(United States) American Viperacing	(United States) Tom Weickardt (United States) Kevin Allen	Dodge 8.0L V10	D	88
22 DNF	LMP675	11	(United States) Roock-KnightHawk Racing	(United States) Steven Knight (Germany) Claudia Hürtgen	Lola B2K/40	A	56
22 DNF	LMP675	11	(United States) Roock-KnightHawk Racing	(United States) Steven Knight (Germany) Claudia Hürtgen	Nissan (AER) VQL 3.4L V6	A	56
23 DNF	GT	10	(United States) Prototype Technology Group	(United States) Joe Foster (Sweden) Niclas Jönsson	BMW M3 GTR	Y	27
23 DNF	GT	10	(United States) Prototype Technology Group	(United States) Joe Foster (Sweden) Niclas Jönsson	BMW 4.0L V8	Y	27
24 DNF	LMP900	1	(Germany) Audi Sport North America	(Italy) Rinaldo Capello (Denmark) Tom Kristensen	Audi R8	MI	24
24 DNF	LMP900	1	(Germany) Audi Sport North America	(Italy) Rinaldo Capello (Denmark) Tom Kristensen	Audi 3.6L Turbo V8	MI	24
25 DNF	GT	30	(United States) Petersen Motorsports	(United Kingdom) Johnny Mowlem (Germany) Timo Bernhard	Porsche 911 GT3-R	MI	21
25 DNF	GT	30	(United States) Petersen Motorsports	(United Kingdom) Johnny Mowlem (Germany) Timo Bernhard	Porsche 3.6L Flat-6	MI	21
26 DNF	LMP900	51	(United States) Panoz Motor Sports	(Germany) Klaus Graf (France) Franck Lagorce	Panoz LMP-1 Roadster-S	MI	1
26 DNF	LMP900	51	(United States) Panoz Motor Sports	(Germany) Klaus Graf (France) Franck Lagorce	Élan 6L8 6.0L V8	MI	1

== Statistics ==
- Pole Position - #1 Audi Sport North America - 1:08.222
- Fastest Lap - #2 Audi Sport North America - 1:10.002
- Time of race - 2:46:03.805
- Distance - 455.098 km
- Average Speed - 164.430 km/h

American Le Mans Series
Previous race: 2001 Grand Prix of Portland	2001 season	Next race: 2001 Grand Prix of Mid-Ohio
