= 2007 Mexico City 400k =

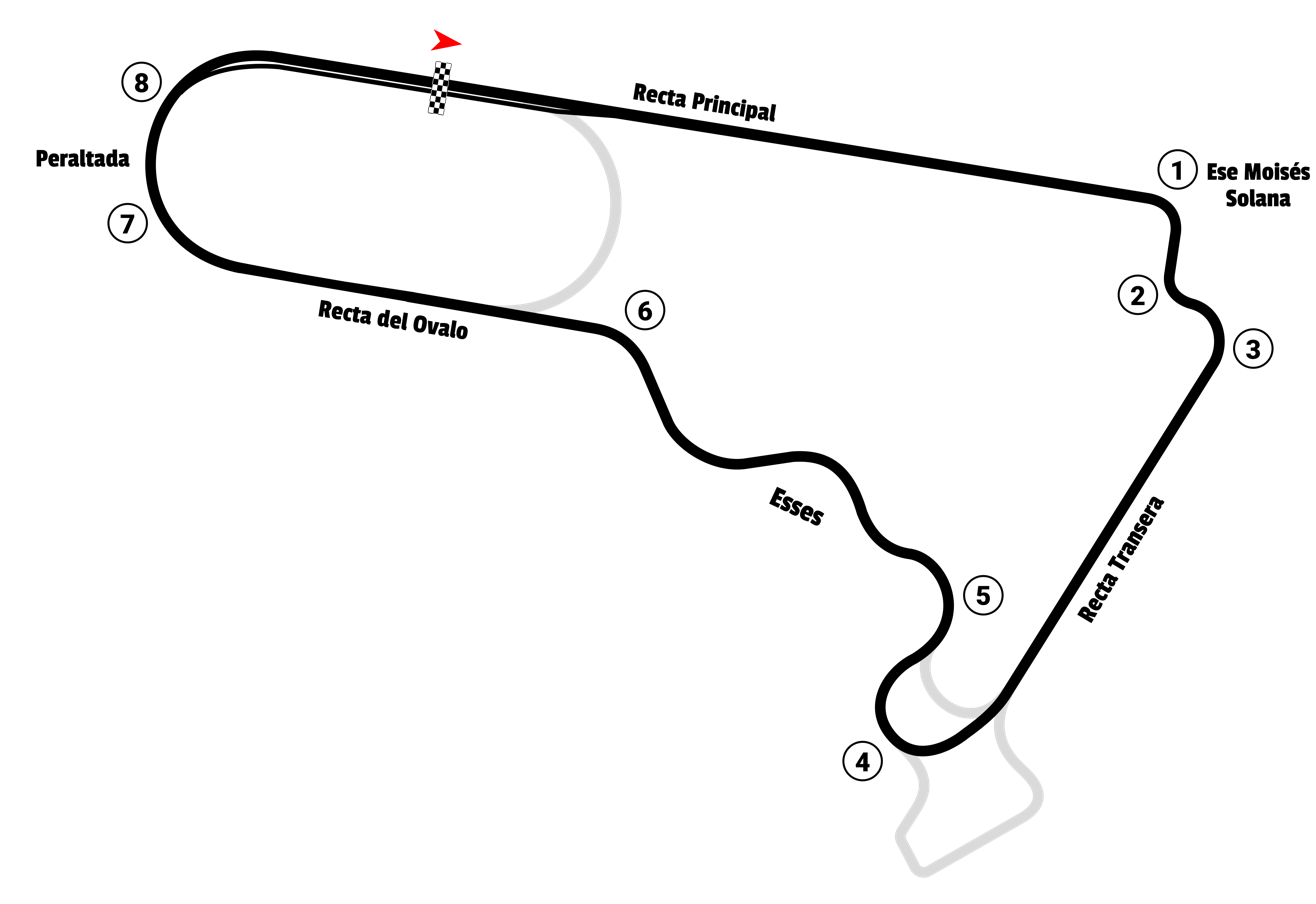
Track map of Autódromo Hermanos Rodríguez

The 2007 Mexico City 400k was a Grand-Am Rolex Sports Car Series race held on March 3, 2007. The race was won by Alex Gurney and Jon Fogarty, driving the No. 99 GAINSCO Auto Insurance Pontiac Riley, campaigned by GAINSCO/Bob Stallings Racing.

== Results ==
Pos.	No.	Class	Class Pos.	Driver(s)	Team	Car
1	99	DP	1	(United States) Jon Fogarty (United States) Alex Gurney	GAINSCO/Bob Stallings Racing	Pontiac Riley
2	75	DP	2	(United States) Colin Braun (Italy) Max Papis	Krohn Racing	Pontiac Riley
3	10	DP	3	(Italy) Max Angelelli (Denmark) Jan Magnussen	SunTrust Racing	Pontiac Riley
4	01	DP	4	(United States) Scott Pruett (Mexico) Memo Rojas	Chip Ganassi Racing	Lexus Riley
5	23	DP	5	(United States) Patrick Long (Germany) Jorg Bergmeister	Alex Job Racing	Porsche Crawford
6	58	DP	6	(United States) David Donohue (Canada) Darren Law	Red Bull/Brumos Porsche	Porsche Riley
7	61	DP	7	(Canada) Mark Wilkins (United States) Brian Frisselle	AIM Autosport	Lexus Riley
8	76	DP	8	(United States) Tracy Krohn (Sweden) Nic Jonsson	Krohn Racing	Pontiac Riley
9	60	DP	9	(United States) Mark Patterson (Brazil) Oswaldo Negri Jr.	Michael Shank Racing	Lexus Riley
10	6	DP	10	(United States) Henri Zogaib (United Kingdom) Ian James	Michael Shank Racing	Lexus Riley
11	11	DP	11	(Venezuela) Milka Duno (Canada) Patrick Carpentier	SAMAX Motorsport	Pontiac Riley
12	77	DP	12	(Mexico) Memo Gidley (Mexico) Jorge Goeters	Doran Racing	Ford Doran

- DP: Daytona Prototype
- GT: Grand Touring
