= 2001 Grand Prix of Mid-Ohio =

The layout of Mid-Ohio Sports Car Course

The 2001 Grand Prix of Mid-Ohio was the eighth round of the 2001 American Le Mans Series season. It took place at Mid-Ohio Sports Car Course, Ohio, on August 25, 2001.

== Official results ==
Class winners in bold.

Pos	Class	No	Team	Drivers	Chassis	Tyre	Laps
Pos	Class	No	Team	Drivers	Engine	Tyre	Laps
1	**LMP900**	**50**	**(United States) Panoz Motor Sports**	**(Denmark) Jan Magnussen (Australia) David Brabham**	**Panoz LMP-1 Roadster-S**	MI	**116**
1	**LMP900**	**50**	**(United States) Panoz Motor Sports**	**(Denmark) Jan Magnussen (Australia) David Brabham**	**Élan 6L8 6.0L V8**	MI	**116**
2	LMP900	1	(Germany) Audi Sport North America	(Italy) Rinaldo Capello (Denmark) Tom Kristensen	Audi R8	MI	116
2	LMP900	1	(Germany) Audi Sport North America	(Italy) Rinaldo Capello (Denmark) Tom Kristensen	Audi 3.6L Turbo V8	MI	116
3	LMP900	16	(United States) Dyson Racing	(United States) Butch Leitzinger (United Kingdom) James Weaver	Riley & Scott Mk III C	G	116
3	LMP900	16	(United States) Dyson Racing	(United States) Butch Leitzinger (United Kingdom) James Weaver	Lincoln (Élan) 6.0L V8	G	116
4	LMP900	2	(Germany) Audi Sport North America	(Germany) Frank Biela (Italy) Emanuele Pirro	Audi R8	MI	116
4	LMP900	2	(Germany) Audi Sport North America	(Germany) Frank Biela (Italy) Emanuele Pirro	Audi 3.6L Turbo V8	MI	116
5	LMP900	38	(United States) Champion Racing	(United Kingdom) Andy Wallace (United Kingdom) Johnny Herbert	Audi R8	MI	115
5	LMP900	38	(United States) Champion Racing	(United Kingdom) Andy Wallace (United Kingdom) Johnny Herbert	Audi 3.6L Turbo V8	MI	115
6	LMP900	51	(United States) Panoz Motor Sports	(Germany) Klaus Graf (France) Franck Lagorce	Panoz LMP-1 Roadster-S	MI	115
6	LMP900	51	(United States) Panoz Motor Sports	(Germany) Klaus Graf (France) Franck Lagorce	Élan 6L8 6.0L V8	MI	115
7	LMP900	8	(United States) Team Cadillac	(South Africa) Wayne Taylor (Italy) Max Angelelli	Cadillac Northstar LMP01	MI	114
7	LMP900	8	(United States) Team Cadillac	(South Africa) Wayne Taylor (Italy) Max Angelelli	Cadillac Northstart 4.0L Turbo V8	MI	114
8	LMP900	7	(United States) Team Cadillac	(France) Emmanuel Collard (France) Christophe Tinseau	Cadillac Northstar LMP01	MI	113
8	LMP900	7	(United States) Team Cadillac	(France) Emmanuel Collard (France) Christophe Tinseau	Cadillac Northstar 4.0L Turbo V8	MI	113
9	**LMP675**	**5**	**(United States) Dick Barbour Racing**	**(Belgium) Bruno Lambert (Belgium) Didier de Radigues**	**Reynard 01Q**	G	**109**
9	**LMP675**	**5**	**(United States) Dick Barbour Racing**	**(Belgium) Bruno Lambert (Belgium) Didier de Radigues**	**Judd GV675 3.4L V8**	G	**109**
10	**GTS**	**3**	**(United States) Corvette Racing**	**(Canada) Ron Fellows (United States) Johnny O'Connell**	**Chevrolet Corvette C5-R**	G	**109**
10	**GTS**	**3**	**(United States) Corvette Racing**	**(Canada) Ron Fellows (United States) Johnny O'Connell**	**Chevrolet 7.0L V8**	G	**109**
11	GTS	4	(United States) Corvette Racing	(United States) Andy Pilgrim (United States) Kelly Collins	Chevrolet Corvette C5-R	G	109
11	GTS	4	(United States) Corvette Racing	(United States) Andy Pilgrim (United States) Kelly Collins	Chevrolet 7.0L V8	G	109
12	LMP675	11	(United States) Roock-KnightHawk Racing	(United States) Steven Knight (Germany) Claudia Hürtgen	Lola B2K/40	A	108
12	LMP675	11	(United States) Roock-KnightHawk Racing	(United States) Steven Knight (Germany) Claudia Hürtgen	Nissan (AER) VQL 3.4L V6	A	108
13	GTS	26	(Germany) Konrad Team Saleen	(United States) Terry Borcheller (Austria) Franz Konrad	Saleen S7-R	G	108
13	GTS	26	(Germany) Konrad Team Saleen	(United States) Terry Borcheller (Austria) Franz Konrad	Ford 7.0L V8	G	108
14	**GT**	**42**	**(Germany) BMW Motorsport (Germany) Schnitzer Motorsport**	**(Germany) Jörg Müller (Finland) JJ Lehto**	**BMW M3 GTR**	MI	**107**
14	**GT**	**42**	**(Germany) BMW Motorsport (Germany) Schnitzer Motorsport**	**(Germany) Jörg Müller (Finland) JJ Lehto**	**BMW 4.0L V8**	MI	**107**
15	GT	43	(Germany) BMW Motorsport (Germany) Schnitzer Motorsport	(Germany) Dirk Müller (Sweden) Fredrik Ekblom	BMW M3 GTR	MI	107
15	GT	43	(Germany) BMW Motorsport (Germany) Schnitzer Motorsport	(Germany) Dirk Müller (Sweden) Fredrik Ekblom	BMW 3.2L I6	MI	107
16	GT	22	(United States) Alex Job Racing	(United States) Randy Pobst (Germany) Christian Menzel	Porsche 911 GT3-RS	MI	106
16	GT	22	(United States) Alex Job Racing	(United States) Randy Pobst (Germany) Christian Menzel	Porsche 3.6L Flat-6	MI	106
17	GT	10	(United States) Prototype Technology Group	(United States) Peter Cunningham (Sweden) Niclas Jönsson	BMW M3 GTR	Y	106
17	GT	10	(United States) Prototype Technology Group	(United States) Peter Cunningham (Sweden) Niclas Jönsson	BMW 4.0L V8	Y	106
18	GTS	45	(United States) American Viperacing	(United States) Shane Lewis (United States) David Donohue	Dodge Viper GTS-R	D	106
18	GTS	45	(United States) American Viperacing	(United States) Shane Lewis (United States) David Donohue	Dodge 8.0L V10	D	106
19	GT	30	(United States) Petersen Motorsports	(United Kingdom) Johnny Mowlem (United States) Mike Fitzgerald	Porsche 911 GT3-R	MI	104
19	GT	30	(United States) Petersen Motorsports	(United Kingdom) Johnny Mowlem (United States) Mike Fitzgerald	Porsche 3.6L Flat-6	MI	104
20 DNF	GT	23	(United States) Alex Job Racing	(Germany) Lucas Luhr (Germany) Sascha Maassen	Porsche 911 GT3-RS	MI	102
20 DNF	GT	23	(United States) Alex Job Racing	(Germany) Lucas Luhr (Germany) Sascha Maassen	Porsche 3.6L Flat-6	MI	102
21	GT	6	(United States) Prototype Technology Group	(United States) Boris Said (Germany) Hans-Joachim Stuck	BMW M3 GTR	Y	100
21	GT	6	(United States) Prototype Technology Group	(United States) Boris Said (Germany) Hans-Joachim Stuck	BMW 4.0L V8	Y	100
22	GT	52	(Germany) Seikel Motorsport	(Canada) Tony Burgess (United States) Philip Collin	Porsche 911 GT3-RS	Y	99
22	GT	52	(Germany) Seikel Motorsport	(Canada) Tony Burgess (United States) Philip Collin	Porsche 3.6L Flat-6	Y	99
23	GT	15	(United States) Dick Barbour Racing	(United States) Mark Neuhaus (Mexico) Randy Wars	Porsche 911 GT3-R	D	97
23	GT	15	(United States) Dick Barbour Racing	(United States) Mark Neuhaus (Mexico) Randy Wars	Porsche 3.6L Flat-6	D	97
24 DNF	GT	69	(Canada) Kyser Racing	(Canada) Kye Wankum (United States) Joe Foster	Porsche 911 GT3-R	D	74
24 DNF	GT	69	(Canada) Kyser Racing	(Canada) Kye Wankum (United States) Joe Foster	Porsche 3.6L Flat-6	D	74
25	GTS	44	(United States) American Viperacing	(United States) Tom Weickardt (United States) Joe Ellis	Dodge Viper GTS-R	D	52
25	GTS	44	(United States) American Viperacing	(United States) Tom Weickardt (United States) Joe Ellis	Dodge 8.0L V10	D	52
26 DNF	LMP900	37	(United States) Intersport	(United States) John Field (United States) Joel Field	Lola B2K/10B	G	41
26 DNF	LMP900	37	(United States) Intersport	(United States) John Field (United States) Joel Field	Judd GV4 4.0L V10	G	41
27	LMP675	48	(United States) Southern Comfort Racing	(United States) Jimmy Adams (United States) Joe Blacker	Pilbeam MP84	A	28
27	LMP675	48	(United States) Southern Comfort Racing	(United States) Jimmy Adams (United States) Joe Blacker	Nissan (AER) VQL 3.0L V6	A	28
28 DNF	LMP675	57	(United States) Dick Barbour Racing	(Canada) John Graham (Venezuela) Milka Duno	Reynard 01Q	G	6
28 DNF	LMP675	57	(United States) Dick Barbour Racing	(Canada) John Graham (Venezuela) Milka Duno	Judd GV675 3.4L V8	G	6

== Statistics ==
- Pole Position - #1 Audi Sport North America - 1:14.537
- Fastest Lap - #1 Audi Sport North America - 1:14.784
- Distance - 421.532 km
- Average Speed - 152.630 km/h

American Le Mans Series
Previous race: 2001 Grand Prix of Mosport	2001 season	Next race: 2001 Monterey Sports Car Championships
