= 2001 Grand Prix of Texas =

Texas Motor Speedway

The 2001 Leather Center Grand Prix of Texas was the opening round of the 2001 American Le Mans Series season. It took place at Texas Motor Speedway, Texas, on March 4, 2001.

This event is the only time in the history of the American Le Mans Series that the 12 Hours of Sebring was not the first race on the schedule. This race was also the last time the American Le Mans Series ran on a roval − a combined oval track and road course.

== Official results ==
Class winners in bold.

| Pos | Class | No | Team | Drivers | Chassis | Tyre | Laps |
| Pos | Class | No | Team | Drivers | Engine | Tyre | Laps |
|---|---|---|---|---|---|---|---|
| 1 | **LMP900** | **1** | **(Germany) Audi Sport North America** | **(Denmark) Tom Kristensen (Italy) Rinaldo Capello** | **Audi R8** | MI | **117** |
| 1 | **LMP900** | **1** | **(Germany) Audi Sport North America** | **(Denmark) Tom Kristensen (Italy) Rinaldo Capello** | **Audi 3.6L Turbo V8** | MI | **117** |
| 2 | LMP900 | 2 | (Germany) Audi Sport North America | (Germany) Frank Biela (Italy) Emanuele Pirro | Audi R8 | MI | 117 |
| 2 | LMP900 | 2 | (Germany) Audi Sport North America | (Germany) Frank Biela (Italy) Emanuele Pirro | Audi 3.6L Turbo V8 | MI | 117 |
| 3 | LMP900 | 50 | (United States) Panoz Motor Sports | (Denmark) Jan Magnussen (Australia) David Brabham | Panoz LMP07 | MI | 117 |
| 3 | LMP900 | 50 | (United States) Panoz Motor Sports | (Denmark) Jan Magnussen (Australia) David Brabham | Élan (Zytek) 4.0L V8 | MI | 117 |
| 4 | LMP900 | 38 | (United States) Champion Racing | (United States) Dorsey Schroeder (United Kingdom) Andy Wallace | Audi R8 | MI | 117 |
| 4 | LMP900 | 38 | (United States) Champion Racing | (United States) Dorsey Schroeder (United Kingdom) Andy Wallace | Audi 3.6L Turbo V8 | MI | 117 |
| 5 | LMP900 | 51 | (United States) Panoz Motor Sports | (Germany) Klaus Graf (Brazil) Gualter Salles | Panoz LMP-1 Roadster-S | MI | 116 |
| 5 | LMP900 | 51 | (United States) Panoz Motor Sports | (Germany) Klaus Graf (Brazil) Gualter Salles | Élan 6L8 6.0L V8 | MI | 116 |
| 6 | LMP900 | 49 | (United States) Panoz Motor Sports | (United States) Jay Cochran (United Kingdom) Richard Dean | Panoz LMP-1 Roadster-S | MI | 113 |
| 6 | LMP900 | 49 | (United States) Panoz Motor Sports | (United States) Jay Cochran (United Kingdom) Richard Dean | Élan 6L8 6.0L V8 | MI | 113 |
| 7 | **GTS** | **3** | **(United States) Corvette Racing** | **(Canada) Ron Fellows (United States) Johnny O'Connell** | **Chevrolet Corvette C5-R** | G | **108** |
| 7 | **GTS** | **3** | **(United States) Corvette Racing** | **(Canada) Ron Fellows (United States) Johnny O'Connell** | **Chevrolet 7.0L V8** | G | **108** |
| 8 | **GT** | **23** | **(United States) Alex Job Racing** | **(Germany) Lucas Luhr (Germany) Sascha Maassen** | **Porsche 911 GT3-RS** | MI | **108** |
| 8 | **GT** | **23** | **(United States) Alex Job Racing** | **(Germany) Lucas Luhr (Germany) Sascha Maassen** | **Porsche 3.6L Flat-6** | MI | **108** |
| 9 | GT | 22 | (United States) Alex Job Racing | (United States) Randy Pobst (Germany) Christian Menzel | Porsche 911 GT3-RS | MI | 107 |
| 9 | GT | 22 | (United States) Alex Job Racing | (United States) Randy Pobst (Germany) Christian Menzel | Porsche 3.6L Flat-6 | MI | 107 |
| 10 | GT | 6 | (United States) Prototype Technology Group | (United States) Boris Said (Germany) Hans-Joachim Stuck | BMW M3 | Y | 107 |
| 10 | GT | 6 | (United States) Prototype Technology Group | (United States) Boris Said (Germany) Hans-Joachim Stuck | BMW 3.2L I6 | Y | 107 |
| 11 | GT | 30 | (United States) Petersen Motorsports | (United Kingdom) Johnny Mowlem (France) Bob Wollek | Porsche 911 GT3-R | MI | 107 |
| 11 | GT | 30 | (United States) Petersen Motorsports | (United Kingdom) Johnny Mowlem (France) Bob Wollek | Porsche 3.6L Flat-6 | MI | 107 |
| 12 | GT | 42 | (Germany) BMW Motorsport (Germany) Schnitzer Motorsport | (Germany) Jörg Müller (Finland) JJ Lehto | BMW M3 | MI | 107 |
| 12 | GT | 42 | (Germany) BMW Motorsport (Germany) Schnitzer Motorsport | (Germany) Jörg Müller (Finland) JJ Lehto | BMW 3.2L I6 | MI | 107 |
| 13 | GT | 99 | (United States) Kelly-Moss Motorsports | (United States) Anthony Lazzaro (France) Christophe Bouchut | Porsche 911 GT3-RS | Y | 106 |
| 13 | GT | 99 | (United States) Kelly-Moss Motorsports | (United States) Anthony Lazzaro (France) Christophe Bouchut | Porsche 3.6L Flat-6 | Y | 106 |
| 14 | GT | 10 | (United States) Prototype Technology Group | (United States) Bill Auberlen (Sweden) Niclas Jönsson | BMW M3 | Y | 106 |
| 14 | GT | 10 | (United States) Prototype Technology Group | (United States) Bill Auberlen (Sweden) Niclas Jönsson | BMW 3.2L I6 | Y | 106 |
| 15 | GTS | 45 | (United States) American Viper Racing | (United States) Erik Messley (United States) Terry Borcheller | Dodge Viper GTS-R | D | 106 |
| 15 | GTS | 45 | (United States) American Viper Racing | (United States) Erik Messley (United States) Terry Borcheller | Dodge 8.0L V10 | D | 106 |
| 16 | GT | 52 | (Germany) Seikel Motorsport | (Italy) Stefano Buttiero (Canada) Tony Burgess | Porsche 911 GT3-RS | Y | 102 |
| 16 | GT | 52 | (Germany) Seikel Motorsport | (Italy) Stefano Buttiero (Canada) Tony Burgess | Porsche 3.6L Flat-6 | Y | 102 |
| 17 | GT | 17 | (United States) Trinkler Racing | (United States) Owen Trinkler (United States) Jeff Altenburg | Chevrolet Corvette C5 LM-GT | G | 98 |
| 17 | GT | 17 | (United States) Trinkler Racing | (United States) Owen Trinkler (United States) Jeff Altenburg | Chevrolet 5.7L V8 | G | 98 |
| 18 | GT | 98 | (United States) Kelly-Moss Motorsports | (United States) Cort Wagner (United States) Rick Polk | Porsche 911 GT3-R | Y | 98 |
| 18 | GT | 98 | (United States) Kelly-Moss Motorsports | (United States) Cort Wagner (United States) Rick Polk | Porsche 3.6L Flat-6 | Y | 98 |
| 19 | GTS | 44 | (United States) American Viper Racing | (United States) Tom Weickardt (United States) Joe Ellis | Dodge Viper GTS-R | D | 96 |
| 19 | GTS | 44 | (United States) American Viper Racing | (United States) Tom Weickardt (United States) Joe Ellis | Dodge 8.0L V10 | D | 96 |
| 20 DNF | GTS | 4 | (United States) Corvette Racing | (United States) Andy Pilgrim (United States) Kelly Collins | Chevrolet Corvette C5-R | G | 61 |
| 20 DNF | GTS | 4 | (United States) Corvette Racing | (United States) Andy Pilgrim (United States) Kelly Collins | Chevrolet 7.0L V8 | G | 61 |
| 21 DNF | LMP675 | 11 | (United States) Roock-KnightHawk Racing | (United States) Steven Knight (United States) Mel Hawkins | Lola B2K/40 | A | 23 |
| 21 DNF | LMP675 | 11 | (United States) Roock-KnightHawk Racing | (United States) Steven Knight (United States) Mel Hawkins | Nissan (AER) VQL 3.4L V6 | A | 23 |
| 22 DNF | GT | 12 | (United States) Aspen Knolls MCR | (United States) Shane Lewis (United States) Vic Rice | Callaway C12-R | G | 14 |
| 22 DNF | GT | 12 | (United States) Aspen Knolls MCR | (United States) Shane Lewis (United States) Vic Rice | Chevrolet 7.0L V8 | G | 14 |

== Statistics ==
- Pole Position - #1 Audi Sport North America - 1:48.029
- Fastest Lap - #1 Audi Sport North America - 1:48.418
- Distance - 2060.282 km
- Average Speed - 171.406 km/h

American Le Mans Series
| Previous race: None | 2001 season | Next race: 2001 12 Hours of Sebring |
