= 2001 Grand Prix of Portland =

Track map of Portland International Raceway

The 2001 Grand Prix of Portland was the sixth round of the 2001 American Le Mans Series season. It took place at Portland International Raceway, Oregon, on August 5, 2001.

== Official results ==
Class winners in bold.

Pos	Class	No	Team	Drivers	Chassis	Tyre	Laps
Pos	Class	No	Team	Drivers	Engine	Tyre	Laps
1	**LMP900**	**50**	**(United States) Panoz Motor Sports**	**(Denmark) Jan Magnussen (Australia) David Brabham**	**Panoz LMP-1 Roadster-S**	MI	**131**
1	**LMP900**	**50**	**(United States) Panoz Motor Sports**	**(Denmark) Jan Magnussen (Australia) David Brabham**	**Élan 6L8 6.0L V8**	MI	**131**
2	LMP900	2	(Germany) Audi Sport North America	(Germany) Frank Biela (Italy) Emanuele Pirro	Audi R8	MI	131
2	LMP900	2	(Germany) Audi Sport North America	(Germany) Frank Biela (Italy) Emanuele Pirro	Audi 3.6L Turbo V8	MI	131
3	LMP900	38	(United States) Champion Racing	(United Kingdom) Andy Wallace (United Kingdom) Johnny Herbert	Audi R8	MI	131
3	LMP900	38	(United States) Champion Racing	(United Kingdom) Andy Wallace (United Kingdom) Johnny Herbert	Audi 3.6L Turbo V8	MI	131
4	LMP900	51	(United States) Panoz Motor Sports	(Germany) Klaus Graf (France) Franck Lagorce	Panoz LMP-1 Roadster-S	MI	131
4	LMP900	51	(United States) Panoz Motor Sports	(Germany) Klaus Graf (France) Franck Lagorce	Élan 6L8 6.0L V8	MI	131
5	LMP900	1	(Germany) Audi Sport North America	(Italy) Rinaldo Capello (Denmark) Tom Kristensen	Audi R8	MI	127
5	LMP900	1	(Germany) Audi Sport North America	(Italy) Rinaldo Capello (Denmark) Tom Kristensen	Audi 3.6L Turbo V8	MI	127
6	**LMP675**	**57**	**(United States) Dick Barbour Racing**	**(Venezuela) Milka Duno (Belgium) Didier de Radigues (Canada) John Graham**	**Reynard 01Q**	G	**123**
6	**LMP675**	**57**	**(United States) Dick Barbour Racing**	**(Venezuela) Milka Duno (Belgium) Didier de Radigues (Canada) John Graham**	**Judd GV675 3.4L V8**	G	**123**
7	**GTS**	**3**	**(United States) Corvette Racing**	**(Canada) Ron Fellows (United States) Johnny O'Connell**	**Chevrolet Corvette C5-R**	G	**122**
7	**GTS**	**3**	**(United States) Corvette Racing**	**(Canada) Ron Fellows (United States) Johnny O'Connell**	**Chevrolet 7.0L V8**	G	**122**
8	**GT**	**6**	**(United States) Prototype Technology Group**	**(United States) Boris Said (Germany) Hans-Joachim Stuck**	**BMW M3 GTR**	Y	**121**
8	**GT**	**6**	**(United States) Prototype Technology Group**	**(United States) Boris Said (Germany) Hans-Joachim Stuck**	**BMW 4.0L V8**	Y	**121**
9	GT	23	(United States) Alex Job Racing	(Germany) Lucas Luhr (Germany) Sascha Maassen	Porsche 911 GT3-RS	MI	120
9	GT	23	(United States) Alex Job Racing	(Germany) Lucas Luhr (Germany) Sascha Maassen	Porsche 3.6L Flat-6	MI	120
10	GT	42	(Germany) BMW Motorsport (Germany) Schnitzer Motorsport	(Germany) Jörg Müller (Finland) JJ Lehto	BMW M3 GTR	MI	120
10	GT	42	(Germany) BMW Motorsport (Germany) Schnitzer Motorsport	(Germany) Jörg Müller (Finland) JJ Lehto	BMW 4.0L V8	MI	120
11	GT	43	(Germany) BMW Motorsport (Germany) Schnitzer Motorsport	(Germany) Dirk Müller (Sweden) Fredrik Ekblom	BMW M3 GTR	MI	120
11	GT	43	(Germany) BMW Motorsport (Germany) Schnitzer Motorsport	(Germany) Dirk Müller (Sweden) Fredrik Ekblom	BMW 4.0L V8	MI	120
12	LMP675	11	(United States) Roock-KnightHawk Racing	(United States) Steven Knight (United States) Mel Hawkins	Lola B2K/40	A	120
12	LMP675	11	(United States) Roock-KnightHawk Racing	(United States) Steven Knight (United States) Mel Hawkins	Nissan (AER) VQL 3.4L V6	A	120
13	GT	22	(United States) Alex Job Racing	(United States) Randy Pobst (Germany) Christian Menzel	Porsche 911 GT3-RS	MI	118
13	GT	22	(United States) Alex Job Racing	(United States) Randy Pobst (Germany) Christian Menzel	Porsche 3.6L Flat-6	MI	118
14	GT	30	(United States) Petersen Motorsports	(United Kingdom) Johnny Mowlem (Germany) Timo Bernhard	Porsche 911 GT3-R	MI	118
14	GT	30	(United States) Petersen Motorsports	(United Kingdom) Johnny Mowlem (Germany) Timo Bernhard	Porsche 3.6L Flat-6	MI	118
15	GTS	45	(United States) American Viperacing	(United States) Shane Lewis (United States) Jeff Altenburg	Dodge Viper GTS-R	D	118
15	GTS	45	(United States) American Viperacing	(United States) Shane Lewis (United States) Jeff Altenburg	Dodge 8.0L V10	D	118
16	GT	69	(Canada) Kyser Racing	(Canada) Kye Wankum (United States) Joe Foster	Porsche 911 GT3-R	D	106
16	GT	69	(Canada) Kyser Racing	(Canada) Kye Wankum (United States) Joe Foster	Porsche 3.6L Flat-6	D	106
17 DNF	GT	10	(United States) Prototype Technology Group	(United States) Bill Auberlen (Sweden) Niclas Jönsson	BMW M3 GTR	Y	102
17 DNF	GT	10	(United States) Prototype Technology Group	(United States) Bill Auberlen (Sweden) Niclas Jönsson	BMW 4.0L V8	Y	102
18 DNF	GTS	26	(Germany) Konrad Team Saleen	(United States) Terry Borcheller (Austria) Franz Konrad	Saleen S7-R	G	85
18 DNF	GTS	26	(Germany) Konrad Team Saleen	(United States) Terry Borcheller (Austria) Franz Konrad	Ford 7.0L V8	G	85
19 DNF	GTS	44	(United States) American Viperacing	(United States) Tom Weickardt (United States) Kevin Allen	Dodge Viper GTS-R	D	78
19 DNF	GTS	44	(United States) American Viperacing	(United States) Tom Weickardt (United States) Kevin Allen	Dodge 8.0L V10	D	78
20 DNF	GT	15	(United States) Dick Barbour Racing	(United States) Mark Neuhaus (Mexico) Randy Wars	Porsche 911 GT3-R	D	13
20 DNF	GT	15	(United States) Dick Barbour Racing	(United States) Mark Neuhaus (Mexico) Randy Wars	Porsche 3.6L Flat-6	D	13
DSQ^{†}	GTS	4	(United States) Corvette Racing	(United States) Andy Pilgrim (United States) Kelly Collins	Chevrolet Corvette C5-R	G	122
DSQ^{†}	GTS	4	(United States) Corvette Racing	(United States) Andy Pilgrim (United States) Kelly Collins	Chevrolet 7.0L V8	G	122

† - #4 Corvette Racing was disqualified for failing post-race technical inspection. The car was below the legal weight limit.

== Statistics ==
- Pole Position - #50 Panoz Motor Sports - 1:04:121
- Fastest Lap - #1 Audi Sport North America - 1:05.360
- Distance - 409.842 km
- Average Speed - 148.409 km/h

American Le Mans Series
Previous race: 2001 Grand Prix of Sonoma	2001 season	Next race: 2001 Grand Prix of Mosport
