= 2000 Grand Prix of Charlotte =

Lowe's Motor Speedway

The 2000 Grand Prix of Charlotte was the second round of the 2000 American Le Mans Series season. It took place at Lowe's Motor Speedway, North Carolina, on April 1, 2000.

== Race results ==
Class winners in bold.

Pos	Class	No	Team	Drivers	Chassis	Tyre	Laps
Pos	Class	No	Team	Drivers	Engine	Tyre	Laps
1	**LMP**	**42**	**(Germany) BMW Motorsport (Germany) Schnitzer Motorsport**	**(Germany) Jörg Müller (Finland) JJ Lehto**	**BMW V12 LMR**	MI	**125**
1	**LMP**	**42**	**(Germany) BMW Motorsport (Germany) Schnitzer Motorsport**	**(Germany) Jörg Müller (Finland) JJ Lehto**	**BMW S70 6.0 L V12**	MI	**125**
2	LMP	1	(United States) Panoz Motor Sports	(Australia) David Brabham (Denmark) Jan Magnussen	Panoz LMP-1 Roadster-S	MI	125
2	LMP	1	(United States) Panoz Motor Sports	(Australia) David Brabham (Denmark) Jan Magnussen	Élan 6L8 6.0 L V8	MI	125
3	LMP	0	(Italy) Team Rafanelli SRL	(Italy) Mimmo Schiattarella (Belgium) Didier de Radiguès	Lola B2K/10	MI	124
3	LMP	0	(Italy) Team Rafanelli SRL	(Italy) Mimmo Schiattarella (Belgium) Didier de Radiguès	Judd (Rafanelli) GV4 4.0 L V10	MI	124
4	LMP	43	(Germany) BMW Motorsport (Germany) Schnitzer Motorsport	(France) Jean-Marc Gounon (United States) Bill Auberlen	BMW V12 LMR	MI	124
4	LMP	43	(Germany) BMW Motorsport (Germany) Schnitzer Motorsport	(France) Jean-Marc Gounon (United States) Bill Auberlen	BMW S70 6.0 L V12	MI	124
5	LMP	2	(United States) Panoz Motor Sports	(United States) Johnny O'Connell (Japan) Hiroki Katou	Panoz LMP-1 Roadster-S	MI	124
5	LMP	2	(United States) Panoz Motor Sports	(United States) Johnny O'Connell (Japan) Hiroki Katou	Élan 6L8 6.0 L V8	MI	124
6	LMP	78	(Germany) Audi Sport North America	(Germany) Frank Biela (Italy) Emanuele Pirro	Audi R8R	MI	122
6	LMP	78	(Germany) Audi Sport North America	(Germany) Frank Biela (Italy) Emanuele Pirro	Audi 3.6 L Turbo V8	MI	122
7	**GTS**	**91**	**(France) Viper Team Oreca**	**(Monaco) Olivier Beretta (Austria) Karl Wendlinger**	**Dodge Viper GTS-R**	MI	**117**
7	**GTS**	**91**	**(France) Viper Team Oreca**	**(Monaco) Olivier Beretta (Austria) Karl Wendlinger**	**Dodge 8.0 L V10**	MI	**117**
8	LMP	02	(Germany) Pole Team	(Germany) Norman Simon (Germany) Günther Blieninger (United States) Mark Simo	Riley & Scott Mk III	MI	117
8	LMP	02	(Germany) Pole Team	(Germany) Norman Simon (Germany) Günther Blieninger (United States) Mark Simo	Judd GV4 4.0 L V10	MI	117
9	**GT**	**51**	**(United States) Dick Barbour Racing**	**(Germany) Sascha Maassen (France) Bob Wollek**	**Porsche 911 GT3-R**	MI	**113**
9	**GT**	**51**	**(United States) Dick Barbour Racing**	**(Germany) Sascha Maassen (France) Bob Wollek**	**Porsche 3.6 L Flat-6**	MI	**113**
10	GT	10	(United States) Prototype Technology Group	(United States) Peter Cunningham (United States) Brian Cunningham	BMW M3	Y	113
10	GT	10	(United States) Prototype Technology Group	(United States) Peter Cunningham (United States) Brian Cunningham	BMW 3.2 L I6	Y	113
11	GTS	08	(United States) Roock Motorsport North America	(United States) Zak Brown (United States) Vic Rice	Porsche 911 GT2	Y	112
11	GTS	08	(United States) Roock Motorsport North America	(United States) Zak Brown (United States) Vic Rice	Porsche 3.8 L Turbo Flat-6	Y	112
12	GT	22	(United States) Alex Job Racing	(United States) Mike Fitzgerald (United States) Robert Nagel	Porsche 911 GT3-R	MI	111
12	GT	22	(United States) Alex Job Racing	(United States) Mike Fitzgerald (United States) Robert Nagel	Porsche 3.6 L Flat-6	MI	111
13	GT	6	(United States) Prototype Technology Group	(United States) Johannes van Overbeek (Germany) Hans-Joachim Stuck	BMW M3	Y	111
13	GT	6	(United States) Prototype Technology Group	(United States) Johannes van Overbeek (Germany) Hans-Joachim Stuck	BMW 3.2 L I6	Y	111
14	GT	70	(Australia) Skea Racing International	(United Kingdom) Johnny Mowlem (United States) David Murry	Porsche 911 GT3-R	P	110
14	GT	70	(Australia) Skea Racing International	(United Kingdom) Johnny Mowlem (United States) David Murry	Porsche 3.6 L Flat-6	P	110
15	GT	30	(United States) White Lightning Racing	(United States) Gunnar Jeannette (United States) Quentin Wahl	Porsche 911 GT3-R	P	109
15	GT	30	(United States) White Lightning Racing	(United States) Gunnar Jeannette (United States) Quentin Wahl	Porsche 3.6 L Flat-6	P	109
16	GT	21	(United States) MCR/Aspen Knolls	(United States) Shane Lewis (United States) Cort Wagner	Porsche 911 GT3-R	P	108
16	GT	21	(United States) MCR/Aspen Knolls	(United States) Shane Lewis (United States) Cort Wagner	Porsche 3.6 L Flat-6	P	108
17	GT	23	(United States) Alex Job Racing	(United States) Randy Pobst (Belgium) Bruno Lambert	Porsche 911 GT3-R	MI	106
17	GT	23	(United States) Alex Job Racing	(United States) Randy Pobst (Belgium) Bruno Lambert	Porsche 3.6 L Flat-6	MI	106
18	GT	71	(Australia) Skea Racing International	(Australia) Rohan Skea (United States) Grady Willingham	Porsche 911 GT3-R	P	104
18	GT	71	(Australia) Skea Racing International	(Australia) Rohan Skea (United States) Grady Willingham	Porsche 3.6 L Flat-6	P	104
19	GTS	92	(France) Viper Team Oreca	(United States) David Donohue (United States) Tommy Archer	Dodge Viper GTS-R	MI	95
19	GTS	92	(France) Viper Team Oreca	(United States) David Donohue (United States) Tommy Archer	Dodge 8.0 L V10	MI	95
20	LMP	77	(Germany) Audi Sport North America	(Italy) Rinaldo Capello (Italy) Michele Alboreto (United Kingdom) Allan McNish	Audi R8R	MI	93
20	LMP	77	(Germany) Audi Sport North America	(Italy) Rinaldo Capello (Italy) Michele Alboreto (United Kingdom) Allan McNish	Audi 3.6 L Turbo V8	MI	93
21	GT	5	(United States) Dick Barbour Racing	(Germany) Dirk Müller (Germany) Lucas Luhr	Porsche 911 GT3-R	MI	91
21	GT	5	(United States) Dick Barbour Racing	(Germany) Dirk Müller (Germany) Lucas Luhr	Porsche 3.6 L Flat-6	MI	91
22 DNF	GTS	40	(United States) DonMcGill.com Porsche Racing	(United States) Sam Shalala (Canada) Bertrand Godin	Porsche 911 GT2	P	79
22 DNF	GTS	40	(United States) DonMcGill.com Porsche Racing	(United States) Sam Shalala (Canada) Bertrand Godin	Porsche 3.8 L Turbo Flat-6	P	79
23 DNF	GT	89	(United States) Michael Colucci Racing (United States) Nygmatech	(United Kingdom) Ian James (United States) Kurt Baumann	Porsche 911 GT3-R	P	74
23 DNF	GT	89	(United States) Michael Colucci Racing (United States) Nygmatech	(United Kingdom) Ian James (United States) Kurt Baumann	Porsche 3.6 L Flat-6	P	74

== Statistics ==
- Pole Position - #42 BMW Motorsport - 1:04.096
- Fastest Lap - #1 Panoz Motor Sport - 1:05.524
- Distance - 452.628 km
- Average Speed - 163.796 km/h

American Le Mans Series
Previous race: 2000 12 Hours of Sebring	2000 season	Next race: 2000 Silverstone 500 USA Challenge
