= Élan Motorsport Technologies =

Race car engineering, development, and manufacturing company

- Type: Corporation
- Industry: Automotive
- Founded: 1997
- Headquarters: Braselton, Georgia
- Website: http://www.elanmotorsports.com/

Élan Motorsport Technologies is an American enterprise that serves as an umbrella company containing the race car engineering, development, and manufacturing companies owned by American racing and automotive company conglomerate Panoz. Élan designs and builds Panoz-branded race cars and components. Since its founding it has also acquired several manufacturers, including famous Formula Ford builders Van Diemen and IndyCar Series constructor G-Force. Élan-built cars have successfully competed in the American Le Mans Series, Le Mans Series, IMSA Prototype Lites (formerly IMSA Lites) and various other championships, racing series and types of professional racing throughout the world. It designs, develops and manufactures full line race cars, i.e. chassis, bodies, components and engines for professional racing competition for a variety of segments and classes.

== Sports cars ==
Panoz' first foray into racing cars came with the Panoz Esperante GTR-1 in 1997. The car was built for the GT1 category of highly modified supercars, bearing little resemblance to normal production cars. The GTR-1 was unique for its front-engine design, whereas all of its competitors were rear-engined designs.

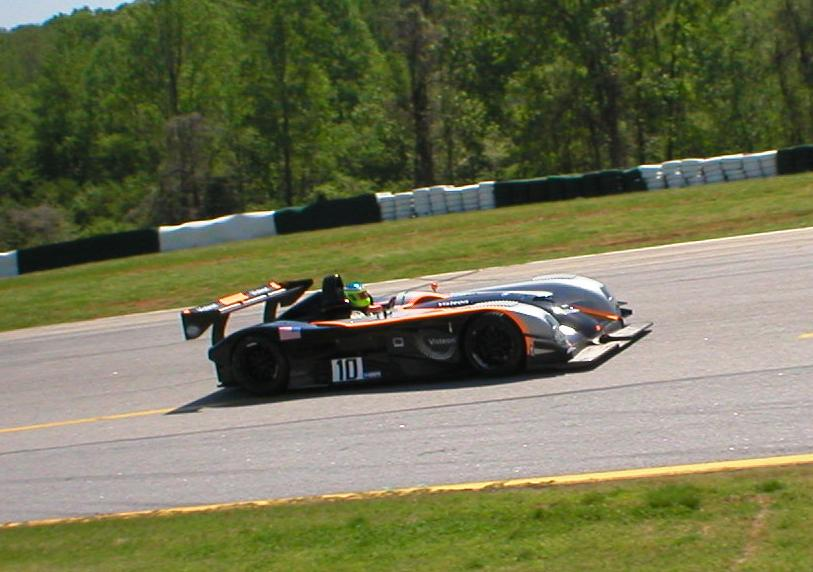
Panoz LMP-1 Roadster S

In 1999, changes in regulations led to the development of an open-top spyder for the LMP900 class, the Panoz LMP-1 Roadster-S. Like the GTR-1, the LMP-1 was a front-engine car. Its unique design, along with its 6.0L Ford-derived V8, made it a fan favorite. In 2001, Panoz designed a successor to the LMP-1, the LMP07. Although the Andy Thorby-designed car had high expectations, it turned out to be a failure. The car used a Zytek V8, tuned by Élan Power Products (the first use of the Élan name in Panoz' motorsports ventures). The car was replaced mid-season by the LMP-1, which carried on until the end of the 2003 season.

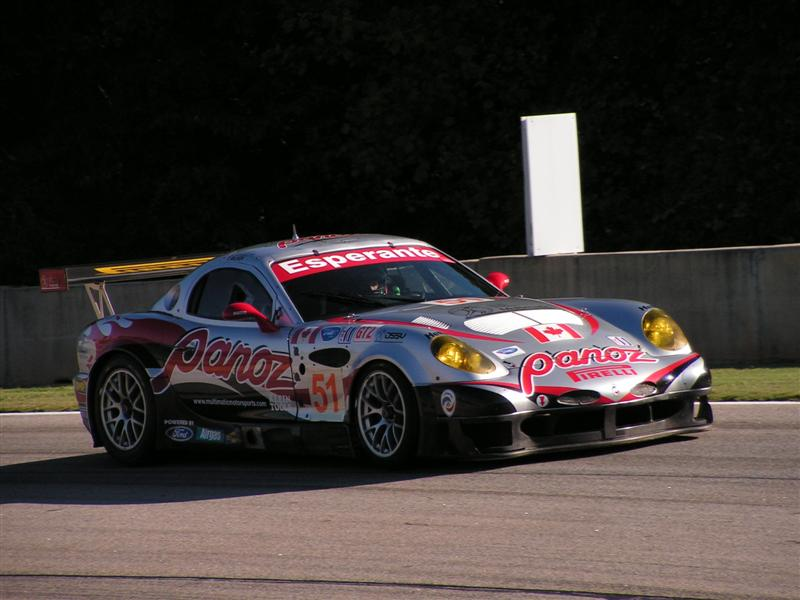
Panoz Esperante GTLM

In 2003, Élan debuted the a new race car based on the production Panoz Esperante, called the Esperante GTLM. The GTLM was designed for the "LM"GT2 class for slightly modified production sports cars. The 2003 car was raced by Hyper Sport Competition, and was used mainly as a development year. A revised version first raced in 2004. The car is powered by an EPP 5.0L V8. In 2006, the GTLM won both the GT2 class at the 12 Hours of Sebring (in the hands of Multimatic Motorsports) and the 24 Hours of Le Mans (run by Team LNT).

In addition to the Esperante GTLM, Élan builds the Esperante GTS, a simplified version of the car with a pushrod V8, tube frame and fiberglass construction, and eligibility for one-make and SCCA racing. This car is used in the Panoz Racing Series, and a less powerful version is utilized by the Panoz Racing School.

Élan also builds the Élan Van Diemen DP02, DP04 and DP06 for the three classes of IMSA Prototype Lites (formerly IMSA Lites) series. The cars are small, center-seat prototypes. A version of the DP04 is also eligible for SCCA Sports Racer categories. All three were adapted from open wheel designs. The DP02 was originally designed for the abandoned Formula X series before being modified for Star Mazda. The DP04 was adapted from Formula 1000 open wheeler.

== Open wheel ==
=== Panoz ===
==== IndyCar Panoz G-Force GF09/PZ09C ====
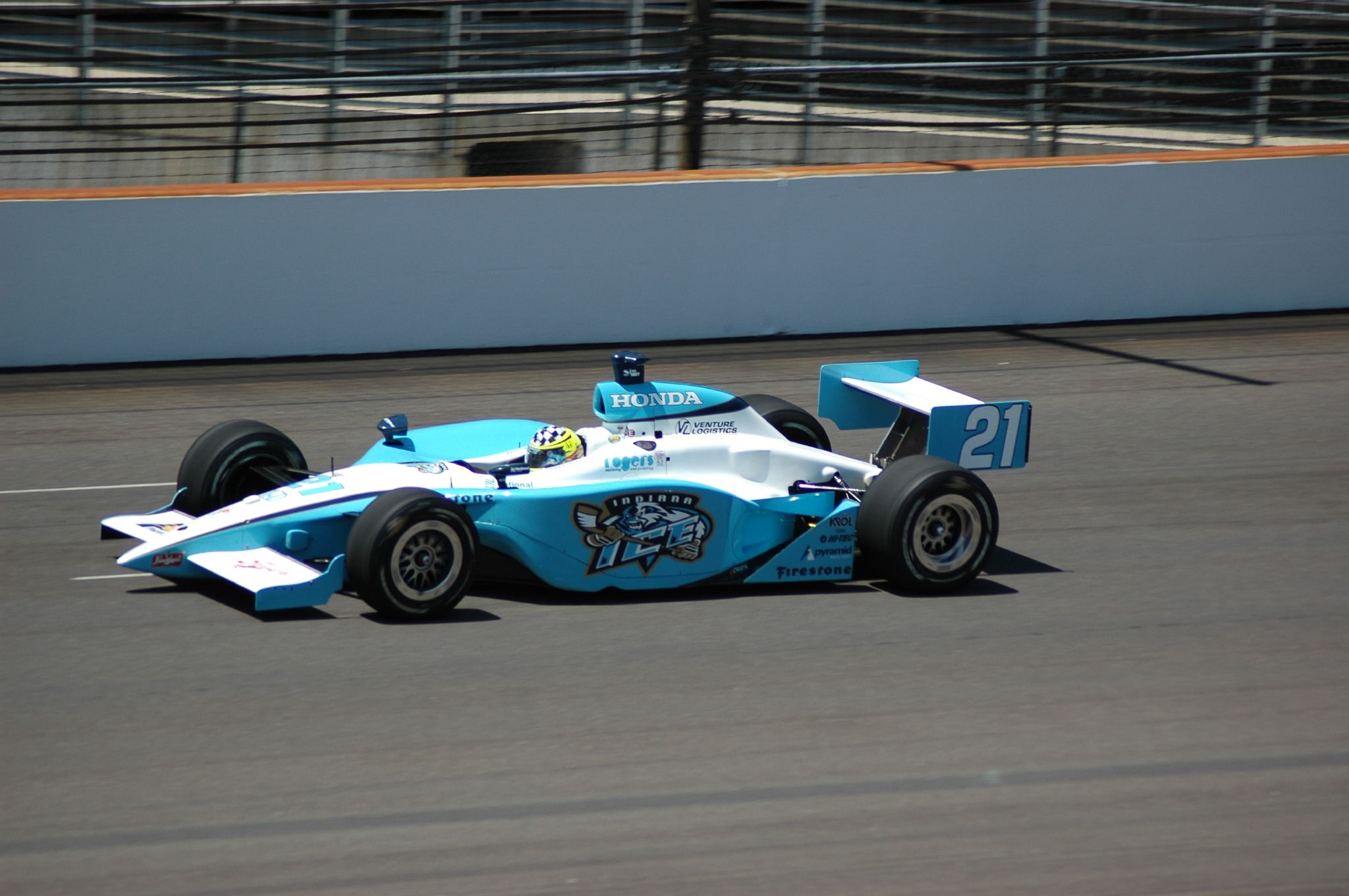
A GF09 driven at Indianapolis by Jaques Lazier in 2007

Following the 2002 purchase of G-Force, Élan Motorsport Technologies took over production of the third generation IRL chassis. The chassis, now branded as a "Panoz G-Force," was designed by former Lola designer Simon Marshall and began use during the 2003 season The car was built in Braselton at the Élan facilities, with design/engineering done at G-Force's remaining operations in England.

The car saw early success winning the 2003 Indy 500 with Team Penske's Gil de Ferran and the 2004 Indy 500 with Rahal Letterman Racing's Buddy Rice. Beginning in 2005, the "G-Force" name was dropped in order to focus on the Panoz brand. All design and engineering operations were moved to Elan's facility in Braselton.

During the 2005 season, teams started to abandon the chassis (in favor of the Dallara) as it became increasingly unstable in traffic at Indy. By 2006, Rahal Letterman Racing was the only team fielding the chassis full-time. The lack of use in turn caused Élan/Panoz to cease development and support. Focus shifted to their DP01 program in Champ Car, further rendering the GF09 uncompetitive. A Panoz G-Force last competed in an IndyCar race in 2007 with Playa Del Racing's two entries and Chastain Motorsports' single car. American Dream Motorsports entered a Panoz in the 2008 Indy 500 for Phil Giebler, but he crashed in practice. In December 2008, Panoz announced the discontinuation of their IndyCar Series program due to Panoz's concentration on sports car racing in 2008 beyond and also several IndyCar Series teams opting for Dallara IR5 chassis.

===== Specifications =====
- Chassis: Carbon-fiber monocoque
- Roll hoop shape: Triangle
- Length: 192 in (4,877 mm)
- Height: 37.5 in (952 mm) excluding roll hoop or camera mount
- Width: 77.5 to 78.5 in (1,968 to 1,994 mm) measured outside rim to rim
- Gearbox: Xtrac #295 (gears forward of rear axle) manual sequential 6-speed gearbox operated via gear lever in the right hand of cockpit
- Suspension: Pushrod with multilink
- Engine: Honda Indy V8, 3498 cc, normally aspirated
- Fuel: Ethanol
- Tires: Firestone Firehawk

Élan NP01

Élan's latest race car is a prototype-style, tube-frame car designed for the 2016 National Auto Sport Association (NASA) Prototype series. It features a four-cylinder Mazda MZR engine mated to a six-speed sequential gearbox.

==== Champ Car DP01 ====
The Panoz DP01 was Élan's most recent foray into major open wheel racing and the first designed and built by Élan. The DP01 was the sole chassis used for the Champ Car World Series in the 2007 season and the 2008 Long Beach Grand Prix.

==== Superleague DP09 ====
The Panoz DP09 was constructed for the inaugural season of the Superleague Formula. Panoz, under the Élan Motorsports banner, produced all the cars for this racing series. The car weighed 675 kg and used a 750 bhp (560 kW) engine built by Menard Competition Technologies.

=== Van Diemen ===
Élan acquired the Van Diemen company in 1999. Van Diemen produced cars for Formula Ford championships around the globe. British race team Fluid Motorsport have taken over the former Snetterton Circuit in Norfolk, United Kingdom where they offer a parts and certification service for historic Van Diemen designs as well as compete in the British Formula Ford Championship.

Van Diemen's Formula Ford designs were optimized for American Formula 1000, Formula Continental and F2000 racing, with the Élan Van Diemen DP04, DP06 and DP08 designs. Van Diemen, once the largest manufacturer of bespoke racing cars in the world through its dominance of Formula Ford, now no longer produces cars for the market.

An Élan/Van Diemen chassis with a spec wing package has been the specified chassis for the U.S. F2000 National Championship since its revival in 2010. It was replaced by a new chassis produced by Tatuus in 2017.
