= Panoz LMP-1 Roadster-S =

Le Mans Prototype built in 1999

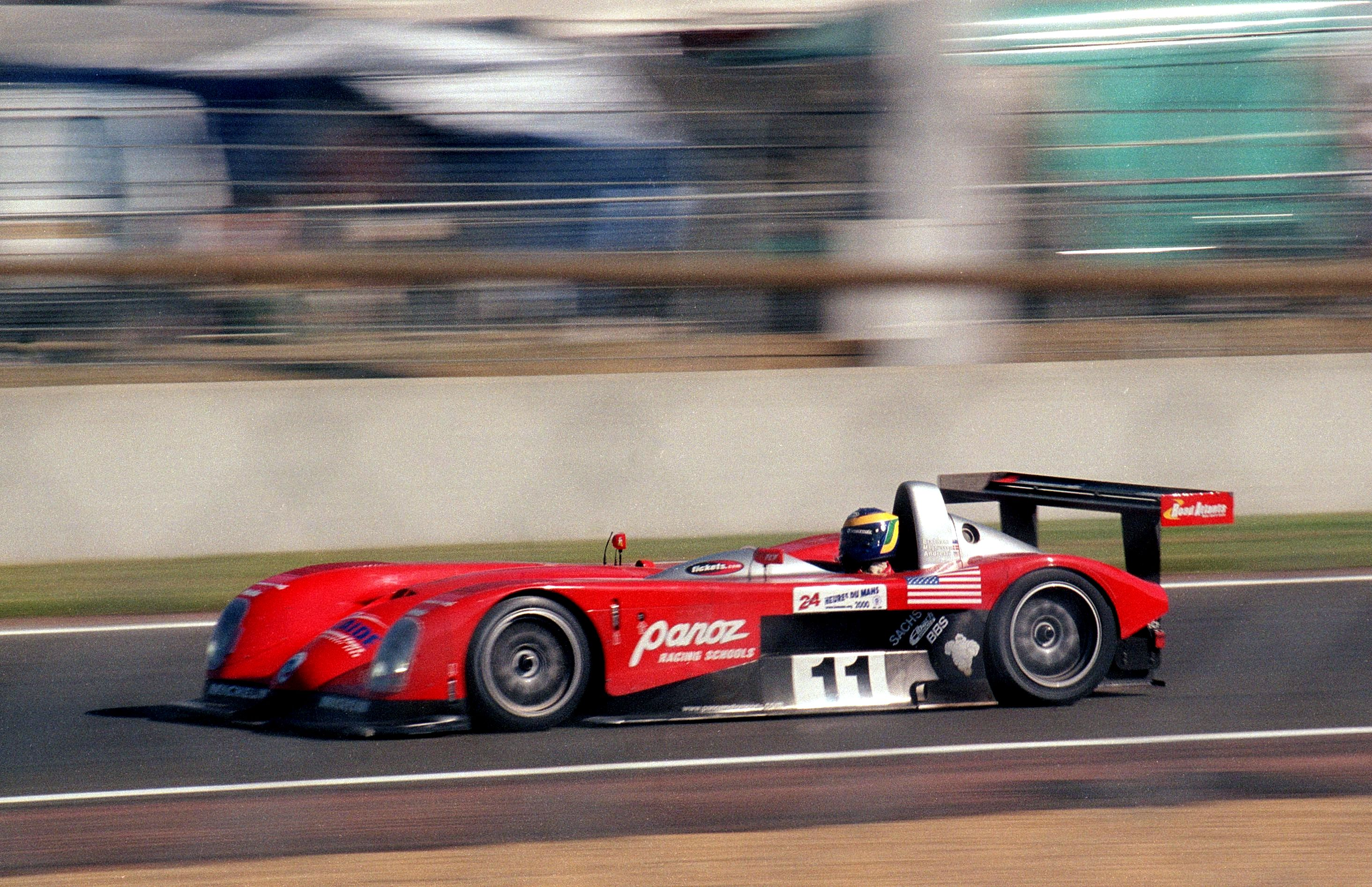
Panoz LMP-1 Roadster S at the 2000 24 Hours of Le Mans

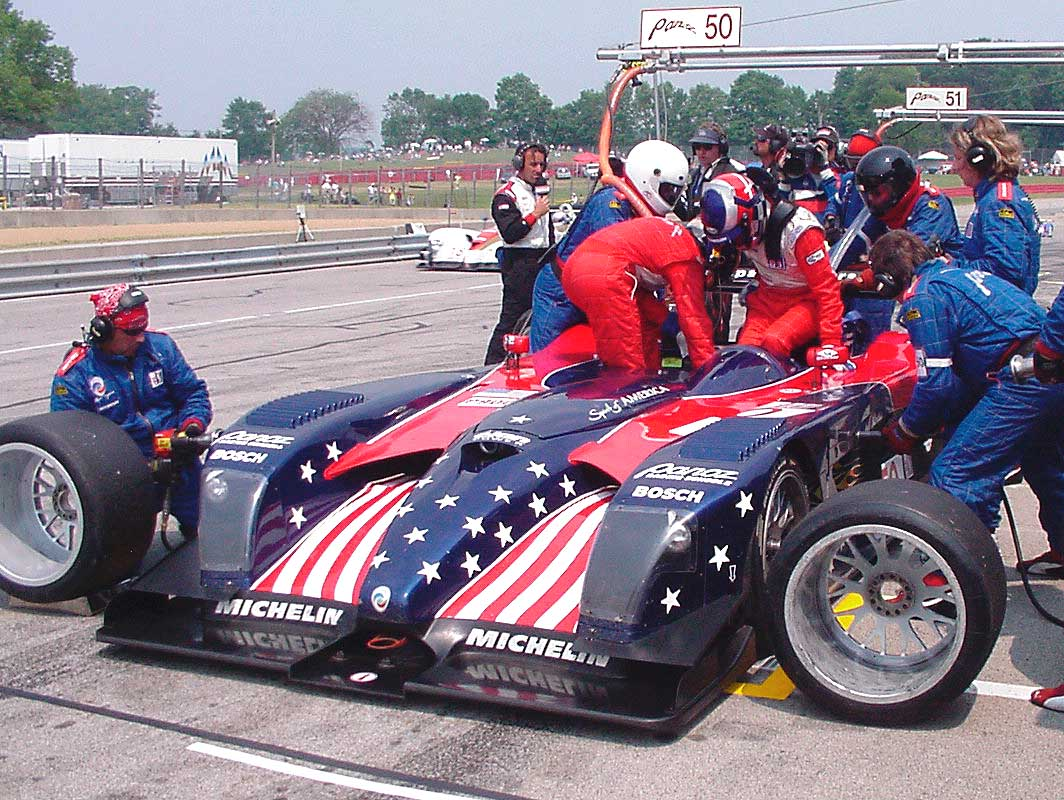
American Le Mans Series (ALMS) race at Mid Ohio in 2002.

The Panoz LMP-1 Roadster-S (sometimes referred to as simply the Panoz LMP-1) was a Le Mans Prototype built for Panoz in 1999. The car was a successor to the Esperante GTR-1 which had competed in the Grand Tourer categories internationally. Following competition in the American Le Mans Series and at the 24 Hours of Le Mans until 2001, the car was replaced by the Panoz LMP07.

The LMP07 would however be abandoned by Panoz and so the LMP-1 Roadster-S was reworked into a new car known as the Panoz LMP01 Evo before being retired at the end of 2003. The LMP-1 Roadster-S and LMP01 Evo were notable amongst Le Mans prototypes in that their engines were located in front of the cockpit rather than the conventional midship configuration. This gave the cars a unique look compared to their competitors.

== Development ==
At the end of 1998, both the FIA GT Championship and United States Road Racing Championship eliminated the GT1 category that the Esperante GTR-1 had competed in since its introduction in 1997. This left the Esperante GTR-1s with nowhere to compete unless they were modified into a Le Mans Prototype, similar to what was done with some Porsche 911 GT1s. However, Panoz decided that an all-new car would be more competitive against the newcoming Audi and BMW prototypes in the American Le Mans Series, a new championship founded by Panoz.

Retaining Reynard Motorsport as a designer, the LMP-1 Roadster-S would retain many styling cues from the Esperante GTR-1, mostly due to the continued usage of the front-engine layout. Although other GT-based cars like the Esperante GTR-1 had used front-engine layouts, it was uncommon for a purpose-built prototype. However Panoz insisted that the LMP-1 Roadster-S would attempt to keep this layout.

From a design standpoint, the LMP-1 Roadster-S shares much with the Esperante GTR-1. Both cars have nearly identical front ends, with narrow fenders surrounding deep valleys with a rounded nose which housed the engine. A NACA duct would feed the air intake for the engine, while the deep valleys on the side that shrouded the front suspension would lead directly to the radiators which were situated in front of the cockpit. The sides of the car would be carved at various angles, giving an indented look in comparison to the fenders, assisting in allowing air to exit from various areas on the car. The cockpit situated behind the engine and just ahead of the rear axle would be small, with a single rollhoop immediately behind the driver with only the driver's side protection and rear headrest appearing from the mostly flat top of the car. The rear overhang would be short, leaving the rear wing struts actually attached to the rear diffuser behind the bodywork.

For a drivetrain, Panoz would retain the Ford Élan Power Products 6L8 6.0 litre V8. X-Trac would provide the six-speed sequential gearbox.

=== LMP01 Evo ===
Following the failure of the LMP07 to perform as planned, Panoz decided that it would be better to return to the LMP-1 Roadster-S that the company understood and knew could perform as promised. But as the continually updated Audi R8 dominated the American Le Mans Series, the company also felt the need to upgrade the LMP-1 Roadster-S in order to remain competitive.

Panoz began by modifying the front of the car to become much more narrow in the fenders and the center nose. All three now came more to a singular point at the front of the car, instead of the rounded design used before. The brake cooling ducts in the nose of the car were also made larger, with the raised nose's tip being moved upward. The air intakes on either side of the nose were also slightly revised by bringing their top edge forward.

The side air exhaust vents were on the other hand made larger, with only a small compliance panel being used behind the front wheel well. The rear bodywork was also extended, now enveloping the rear wing mounts. The mounts themselves were also brought closer together in a fashion similar to that seen on other prototypes.

== Racing history ==
The Panoz LMP-1 Roadster-S would make its debut at the second race of the inaugural American Le Mans Series season in 1999. Backed by title sponsor Visteon, only one car was available in time, leading Panoz to use an older Esperante GTR-1 modified for the LMP class. However, the LMP-1 Roadster-S would perform well on its debut, taking fifth place a mere lap behind the race winner. The second chassis was completed after this race in time for the team to compete in the 24 Hours of Le Mans. Both cars finished in their endurance debut, taking seventh and eleventh places behind BMW, Audi, and Toyota.

On returning to the ALMS for Mosport, both cars were able to overcome the older Riley & Scott-Fords, Ferrari 333 SPs, and withdrawn BMW V12 LMRs to take first and second place. The next round would see the BMW V12 LMR retake the top position, although the two Panozes completed the podium. Both Panozes would again take the podium and win at Portland, before the Petit Le Mans endurance event. A third LMP-1 Roadster-S was now completed, being sold to J&P Motorsport, allowing for all three cars to finish the race. With the one factory car taking the overall win over BMW, the second would take fifth and the J&P Motorsport entry eleventh. The two factory Panozes would finish out the season without another victory, but the 4th place at Grand Prix of Las Vegas from Johnny O'Connell and Jan Magnussen allowed Panoz to take the LMP teams championship by a mere two points over German BMW.

For 2000, one former factory LMP-1 was sold to the Danish Team Den Blå Avis for competition in the Sports Racing World Cup, while two new cars would be built for the factory team in the American Le Mans Series. The season did not begin well for the factory however, as neither car managed to finish the 12 Hours of Sebring. The cars would rebound at Charlotte to finish second and fifth before the series traveled to its new European rounds. Silverstone would once again see a second-place finish behind a BMW before the factory team headed to the 24 Hours of Le Mans.

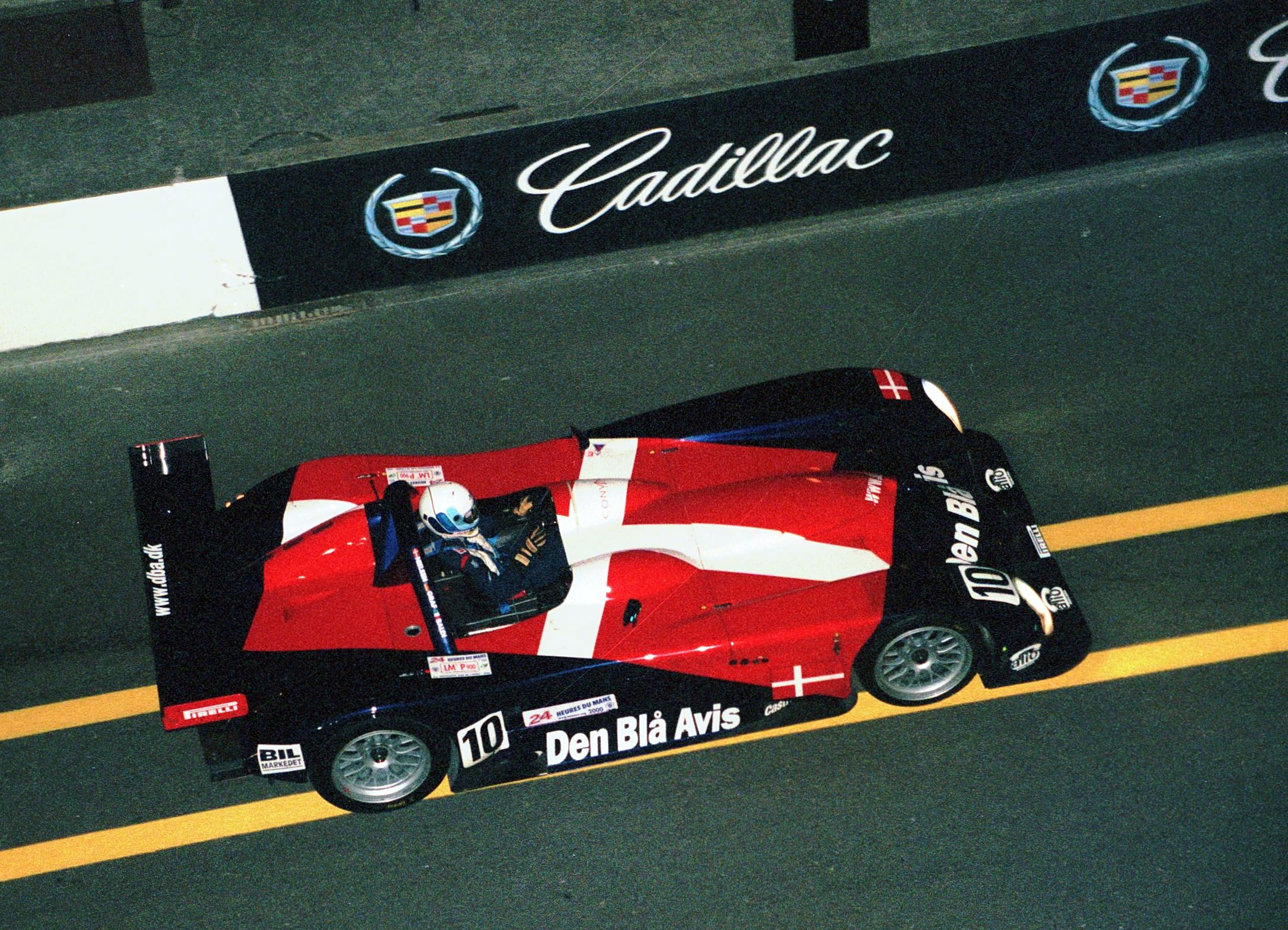
Panoz LMP-1 Roadster S at the 2000 24 Hours of Le Mans

At Le Mans, the two factory Panoz cars were joined by the Den Blå Avis Panoz that had had a best finish of third so far in the Sports Racing World Cup. Two more LMP-1s were also there from Japanese Team Dragon, using one ex-factory car and a newly built car. All five would finish, although Den Blå Avis' entry would not be classified. The other four cars took fifth, sixth, eighth, and fifteenth. Before returning to the United States, the 1000km Nürburgring would be held for the ALMS. A Panoz LMP-1 Roadster-S would manage to take the race win over BMW, the only win that the car would manage the entire year. Panoz would not manage another podium finish in the ALMS until the seventh round, followed by another at Portland. The defending Petit Le Mans winners would once again lose to BMW by taking only third and fourth at the event, before closing out the season without another podium.

Panoz would finish third in the LMP championship behind Audi and BMW, while the LMP-1 Roadster-S' successor, the LMP07, would make its debut at the season finale. In the Sports Racing World Cup, Team Den Blå Avis would be joined by a second LMP-1 Roadster-S for the team, yet they would not manage another podium finish the rest of the season. They too finished the season in third in their championship, behind a pair of Ferrari 333 SPs.

For 2001, Panoz would start the initial race of the season with a pair of LMP-1 Roadster-S before committing fully to their new LMP07 at the next round, the 12 Hours of Sebring. This meant that the LMP-1s would be sold off to privateer teams, with most competing in the new European Le Mans Series. Westward Motorsports would be the first to compete with a customer chassis that season, taking fifth place at Donington Park ahead of the two factory LMP07s. The team would not continue though, and an LMP-1 Roadster-S was soon bought by Lanesra, taking a third-place finish at Most before winning at Vallelunga.

However, by this time Panoz had become frustrated with their new LMP07 following several disappointing performances, when it was decided following Le Mans that the team would bring back their LMP-1 Roadster-S. One car finished on the podium on its return debut before following this with a race win at Portland ahead of the Audi R8s. A second at Mosport was followed by another win at Mid-Ohio. However the team would suffer difficulties at Mazda Raceway Laguna Seca and the Petit Le Mans, leaving them off the podiums. Panoz's combined points between the LMP07 and LMP-1 Roadster-S would earn them second in the LMP900 championship, once again behind Audi.

For 2002, the redesigned LMP-01 Evo would make its debut for Panoz in the American Le Mans Series, fully replacing the abandoned LMP07s. Although they suffered at the 12 Hours of Sebring, they managed to show winning form at Sears Point. However, on return to the 24 Hours of Le Mans, neither car would finish the race. An older LMP-1 Roadster-S was also run in the race as part of a camera car for Michel Valliant, yet also failed to finish.

The team would later win at the temporary street course at RFK Stadium in the ALMS, before troubles with the aged cars saw Panoz fail to score a podium in any of the remaining races that season. Panoz would finish third in the LMP900 championship behind two Audi teams.

The LMP01 Evos would continue into 2003, this time being run by John McLoughlin's JML team in place of the Panoz factory itself, yet still retained factory support. However the pace of the cars was lacking in comparison to its competitors, with a string of five third-place finishes in a row finally eclipsed by a second place at the finale at Petit Le Mans. At the 24 Hours of Le Mans, one of JML's two entries managed to finish in fifth place behind the Audis and Bentleys. The car would officially be retired after the 2003 season, with Panoz deciding instead to concentrate on the new Esperante GT-LM production-based race car for the GT2 class in the American Le Mans Series.

== Chassis ==
A total of eight LMP-1 Roadster-S and LMP01 Evos would be built in total from 1999 to 2002. All were retired from active competition by the end of 2003.

#01

- Panoz Motor Sports (1999)
- Team Dragon (2000, Le Mans only)
- Team Den Blå Avis (2000)
- Lanesra (2001)
- Gunnar Racing (2002)

#002

- Panoz Motor Sports (1999)
- Team Den Blå Avis (2000)

#003

- J&P Motorsport (1999)
- DAMS (2002, Le Mans camera car)

#004

- Panoz Motor Sports (2000–2001)
- Westward Racing (2001, Donington only)

#005 (Upgraded to LMP01 Evo)

- Panoz Motor Sports (2000–2002)
- JML Team Panoz (2003)

#006

- Team Dragon (2000)

#007 (Built as LMP01 Evo)

- Panoz Motor Sports (2002)

#008 (Built as LMP01 Evo)

- Panoz Motor Sports (2002)
- JML Team Panoz (2003)

== Bibliography ==
- Ingram, Jonathan; Brooks, John (2000). Panoz LMP-1 Roadster S: Back to the Future. STALKER International Publishers. ASIN B0015OB7GQ.

== See also ==
- Nissan GT-R LM Nismo
