= 1999 American Le Mans Series =

29th season of the racing series organized by IMSA

Seasons
- ← 1998 (IMSA GT) 2000 →

The 1999 American Le Mans Series was the inaugural season of the IMSA American Le Mans Series, and is now recognised as the 29th season of the IMSA GT Championship. It was a series for Le Mans Prototypes (LMP) and Grand Touring (GT) race cars divided into three classes: LMP, GTS, and GT. It began March 20, 1999, and ended November 7, 1999, after eight races.

The American Le Mans Series officially replaced the dwindling IMSA GT Championship after the 1998 season. The Automobile Club de l'Ouest (ACO), which organized the 24 Hours of Le Mans, allowed IMSA's owner Don Panoz to create a series closely modeled after the formula used at Le Mans. The first official ACO-backed event had been held at the 1998 Petit Le Mans, which was part of the IMSA GT season but allowed ACO-spec cars to compete. The success of the event allowed Panoz to form the American Le Mans Series, which continued until its merger with Grand-Am in 2013.

== Schedule ==
Rnd	Race	Length	Circuit	Location	Date
1	(United States) Superflo 12 Hours of Sebring	12 Hours	Sebring International Raceway	Sebring, Florida	March 20
2	(United States) Grand Prix of Atlanta	2 Hours 45 Minutes	Road Atlanta	Braselton, Georgia	April 18
3	(Canada) Grand Prix of Mosport	2 Hours 45 Minutes	Mosport Park	Bowmanville, Ontario	June 27
4	(United States) Grand Prix of Sonoma	2 Hours 45 Minutes	Sears Point Raceway	Sonoma, California	July 25
5	(United States) Rose City Grand Prix	2 Hours 45 Minutes	Portland International Raceway	Portland, Oregon	August 1
6	(United States) Petit Le Mans	1000 Miles or 10 Hours	Road Atlanta	Braselton, Georgia	September 18
7	(United States) Sports Car Championships	2 Hours 45 Minutes	Laguna Seca Raceway	Monterey, California	October 10
8	(United States) Grand Prix of Las Vegas	2 Hours 45 Minutes	Las Vegas Motor Speedway	Las Vegas, Nevada	November 7

The following round was included on the original calendar but was later cancelled.

Race	Length	Circuit	Location	Date	Cancellation reason
(United States) San Diego Grand Prix	2 Hours 45 Minutes	Streets of San Diego	San Diego, California	November 7	Construction delays

The inaugural ALMS season consisted of 8 races. Six were carried over from the previous seasons IMSA GT Championship which were 12 Hours of Sebring, Grand Prix of Atlanta, Mosport, Petit Le Mans, Laguna Seca and Las Vegas Motor Speedway. The only races not carried over were Lime Rock Park which switched to the USRRC schedule for 1999 and the second Sebring weekend. Sonoma and Portland joined the calendar to hold their first major endurance races since 1997 and 1994 respectively.

Originally the season finale was supposed to be the San Diego Grand Prix held on a 1.5 mile Road course at the former Naval Training Center. However, the season finale would eventually be moved to the Las Vegas Motor Speedway due to construction delays.

== Entry list ==
=== Le Mans Prototype (LMP) ===
Team	Chassis	Engine	Tyre	No.	Drivers	Rnds.
(Italy) Team Rafanelli SRL	Riley & Scott Mk III	Judd GV4 4.0 L V10	Y	0	(Belgium) Eric van de Poele	1–2, 6–8
(Italy) Team Rafanelli SRL	Riley & Scott Mk III	Judd GV4 4.0 L V10	Y	0	(Czech Republic) Tomáš Enge	1, 6
(Italy) Team Rafanelli SRL	Riley & Scott Mk III	Judd GV4 4.0 L V10	Y	0	(Belgium) David Saelens	1
(Italy) Team Rafanelli SRL	Riley & Scott Mk III	Judd GV4 4.0 L V10	Y	0	(Italy) Mimmo Schiattarella	2–8
(Italy) Team Rafanelli SRL	Riley & Scott Mk III	Judd GV4 4.0 L V10	Y	0	(France) Érik Comas	3–5
(United Kingdom) Sintura Racing	Sintura S99	Judd GV4 4.0 L V10	D	00	(United Kingdom) Richard Dean	7
(United Kingdom) Sintura Racing	Sintura S99	Judd GV4 4.0 L V10	D	00	(United Kingdom) Kurt Luby	7
(Canada) Multimatic Motorsports	Lola B98/10	Ford 5.1 L V8	P	06	(Canada) Scott Maxwell	1–3, 6
(Canada) Multimatic Motorsports	Lola B98/10	Ford 5.1 L V8	P	06	(Finland) Harri Toivonen	1–2, 6
(Canada) Multimatic Motorsports	Lola B98/10	Ford 5.1 L V8	P	06	(United States) Danny Sullivan	1*, 3*
(Canada) Multimatic Motorsports	Lola B98/10	Ford 5.1 L V8	P	06	(Canada) Ken Wilden	3
(United States) Panoz Motor Sports	Panoz GTR-1 (Rd. 1) Panoz LMP-1 Roadster-S (Rd. 2–8)	Ford (Roush) 6.0 L V8 (Rd. 1) Ford (Élan-Yates) 6.0 L V8 (Rd. 2–8)	M	1	(Australia) David Brabham	All
(United States) Panoz Motor Sports	Panoz GTR-1 (Rd. 1) Panoz LMP-1 Roadster-S (Rd. 2–8)	Ford (Roush) 6.0 L V8 (Rd. 1) Ford (Élan-Yates) 6.0 L V8 (Rd. 2–8)	M	1	(France) Éric Bernard	All
(United States) Panoz Motor Sports	Panoz GTR-1 (Rd. 1) Panoz LMP-1 Roadster-S (Rd. 2–8)	Ford (Roush) 6.0 L V8 (Rd. 1) Ford (Élan-Yates) 6.0 L V8 (Rd. 2–8)	M	1	(Germany) Klaus Graf	1*
(United States) Panoz Motor Sports	Panoz GTR-1 (Rd. 1) Panoz LMP-1 Roadster-S (Rd. 2–8)	Ford (Roush) 6.0 L V8 (Rd. 1) Ford (Élan-Yates) 6.0 L V8 (Rd. 2–8)	M	1	(United Kingdom) Andy Wallace	6
(United States) Panoz Motor Sports	Panoz GTR-1 (Rd. 1–2) Panoz LMP-1 Roadster-S (Rd. 3–8)	Ford (Roush) 6.0 L V8 (Rd. 1–2) Ford (Élan-Yates) 6.0 L V8 (Rd. 3–8)	M	2	(United States) Johnny O'Connell	All
(United States) Panoz Motor Sports	Panoz GTR-1 (Rd. 1–2) Panoz LMP-1 Roadster-S (Rd. 3–8)	Ford (Roush) 6.0 L V8 (Rd. 1–2) Ford (Élan-Yates) 6.0 L V8 (Rd. 3–8)	M	2	(Denmark) Jan Magnussen	All
(United States) Panoz Motor Sports	Panoz GTR-1 (Rd. 1–2) Panoz LMP-1 Roadster-S (Rd. 3–8)	Ford (Roush) 6.0 L V8 (Rd. 1–2) Ford (Élan-Yates) 6.0 L V8 (Rd. 3–8)	M	2	(Denmark) John Nielsen	1
(United States) Panoz Motor Sports	Panoz GTR-1 (Rd. 1–2) Panoz LMP-1 Roadster-S (Rd. 3–8)	Ford (Roush) 6.0 L V8 (Rd. 1–2) Ford (Élan-Yates) 6.0 L V8 (Rd. 3–8)	M	2	(Mexico) Memo Gidley	6
(United States) Whittington Bros.	Riley & Scott Mk III (Rd. 1) Lola B98/10 (Rd. 2, 4–5)	Ford (Roush) 6.0 L V8	G	5	(United States) Don Whittington	1–2, 4–5
(United States) Whittington Bros.	Riley & Scott Mk III (Rd. 1) Lola B98/10 (Rd. 2, 4–5)	Ford (Roush) 6.0 L V8	G	5	(United States) Dale Whittington	1, 4–5
(United States) Whittington Bros.	Riley & Scott Mk III (Rd. 1) Lola B98/10 (Rd. 2, 4–5)	Ford (Roush) 6.0 L V8	G	5	(United States) Hurley Haywood	1
(United States) Whittington Bros.	Riley & Scott Mk III (Rd. 1) Lola B98/10 (Rd. 2, 4–5)	Ford (Roush) 6.0 L V8	G	5	(United States) Tim Hubman	2
(United States) Transatlantic Racing	Riley & Scott Mk III	Ford 5.0 L V8	G	8	(United States) Scott Schubot	1–2, 4–7
(United States) Transatlantic Racing	Riley & Scott Mk III	Ford 5.0 L V8	G	8	(United States) Henry Camferdam	1–2, 5–6
(United States) Transatlantic Racing	Riley & Scott Mk III	Ford 5.0 L V8	G	8	(United States) Duncan Dayton	1
(United States) Transatlantic Racing	Riley & Scott Mk III	Ford 5.0 L V8	G	8	(United States) Rick Sutherland	4, 6
(United States) Transatlantic Racing	Riley & Scott Mk III	Ford 5.0 L V8	G	8	(United States) Butch Leitzinger	7
(United States) Doyle-Risi Racing	Ferrari 333 SP	Ferrari F310E 4.0 L V12	P	11	(Italy) Max Angelelli	All
(United States) Doyle-Risi Racing	Ferrari 333 SP	Ferrari F310E 4.0 L V12	P	11	(Belgium) Didier de Radiguès	All
(United States) Doyle-Risi Racing	Ferrari 333 SP	Ferrari F310E 4.0 L V12	P	11	(United States) Anthony Lazzaro	1
(United States) Doyle-Risi Racing	Ferrari 333 SP	Ferrari F310E 4.0 L V12	P	11	(France) Xavier Pompidou	6
(United States) Doyle-Risi Racing	Ferrari 333 SP	Ferrari F310E 4.0 L V12	P	12	(Italy) Alex Caffi	All
(United States) Doyle-Risi Racing	Ferrari 333 SP	Ferrari F310E 4.0 L V12	P	12	(South Africa) Wayne Taylor	All
(United States) Doyle-Risi Racing	Ferrari 333 SP	Ferrari F310E 4.0 L V12	P	12	(Argentina) Juan Manuel Fangio II	1
(United States) Doyle-Risi Racing	Ferrari 333 SP	Ferrari F310E 4.0 L V12	P	12	(Italy) Max Angelelli	1
(United States) Doyle-Risi Racing	Ferrari 333 SP	Ferrari F310E 4.0 L V12	P	12	(Italy) Andrea Montermini	6
(United States) J&P Motorsports	Panoz LMP-1 Roadster-S	Ford (Élan-Yates) 6.0 L V8	M	13	(Germany) Klaus Graf	6
(United States) J&P Motorsports	Panoz LMP-1 Roadster-S	Ford (Élan-Yates) 6.0 L V8	M	13	(Netherlands) Jan Lammers	6
(United States) J&P Motorsports	Panoz LMP-1 Roadster-S	Ford (Élan-Yates) 6.0 L V8	M	13	(Austria) Franz Konrad	6
(United States) Hybrid R&D	Riley & Scott Mk III	Ford 5.0 L V8	Y	15	(United States) Chris Bingham	1–5, 7–8
(United States) Hybrid R&D	Riley & Scott Mk III	Ford 5.0 L V8	Y	15	(Canada) Ross Bentley	1–5
(United States) Hybrid R&D	Riley & Scott Mk III	Ford 5.0 L V8	Y	15	(Belgium) Marc Duez	1
(United States) Hybrid R&D	Riley & Scott Mk III	Ford 5.0 L V8	Y	15	(United States) Rick Sutherland	7–8
(United States) Hybrid R&D	Riley & Scott Mk III	Ford 5.0 L V8	Y	15	(United States) Dave Cutler	8
(United States) Dyson Racing	Riley & Scott Mk III	Ford 5.0 L V8	G	16	(United Kingdom) James Weaver	1–5, 7–8
(United States) Dyson Racing	Riley & Scott Mk III	Ford 5.0 L V8	G	16	(United Kingdom) Andy Wallace	1–3
(United States) Dyson Racing	Riley & Scott Mk III	Ford 5.0 L V8	G	16	(United States) Dorsey Schroeder	1
(United States) Dyson Racing	Riley & Scott Mk III	Ford 5.0 L V8	G	16	(United States) Rob Dyson	4
(United States) Dyson Racing	Riley & Scott Mk III	Ford 5.0 L V8	G	16	(Canada) Ron Fellows	5
(United States) Dyson Racing	Riley & Scott Mk III	Ford 5.0 L V8	G	16	(United States) Elliott Forbes-Robinson	5, 7–8
(United States) Dyson Racing	Riley & Scott Mk III	Ford 5.0 L V8	G	20	(United States) Butch Leitzinger	1–6, 8
(United States) Dyson Racing	Riley & Scott Mk III	Ford 5.0 L V8	G	20	(United States) Elliott Forbes-Robinson	1–6
(United States) Dyson Racing	Riley & Scott Mk III	Ford 5.0 L V8	G	20	(United Kingdom) James Weaver	1, 6
(United States) Dyson Racing	Riley & Scott Mk III	Ford 5.0 L V8	G	20	(United States) Rob Dyson	1*
(United States) Dyson Racing	Riley & Scott Mk III	Ford 5.0 L V8	G	20	(United Kingdom) Andy Wallace	8
(United States) Dollahite Racing	Ferrari 333 SP	Ferrari F310E 4.0 L V12	P	18	(United States) Bill Dollahite	All
(United States) Dollahite Racing	Ferrari 333 SP	Ferrari F310E 4.0 L V12	P	18	(United States) Mike Davies	All
(United States) Dollahite Racing	Ferrari 333 SP	Ferrari F310E 4.0 L V12	P	18	(United States) Doc Bundy	1
(United Kingdom) Price & Bscher	BMW V12 LM	BMW S70 6.0 L V12	G(1) Y(4–6)	26	(Germany) Thomas Bscher	1, 4–6
(United Kingdom) Price & Bscher	BMW V12 LM	BMW S70 6.0 L V12	G(1) Y(4–6)	26	(United States) Bill Auberlen	1
(United Kingdom) Price & Bscher	BMW V12 LM	BMW S70 6.0 L V12	G(1) Y(4–6)	26	(United Kingdom) Steve Soper	1
(United Kingdom) Price & Bscher	BMW V12 LM	BMW S70 6.0 L V12	G(1) Y(4–6)	26	(Portugal) Pedro Lamy	4–6
(United States) Doran Lista Racing (United States) Doran Matthews Racing	Ferrari 333 SP	Ferrari F310E 4.0 L V12	M	27	(Belgium) Didier Theys	All
(United States) Doran Lista Racing (United States) Doran Matthews Racing	Ferrari 333 SP	Ferrari F310E 4.0 L V12	M	27	(Italy) Mauro Baldi	1–2, 7–8
(United States) Doran Lista Racing (United States) Doran Matthews Racing	Ferrari 333 SP	Ferrari F310E 4.0 L V12	M	27	(Switzerland) Fredy Lienhard	1, 3–6
(United States) Doran Lista Racing (United States) Doran Matthews Racing	Ferrari 333 SP	Ferrari F310E 4.0 L V12	M	27	(Sweden) Stanley Dickens	6
(United States) Doran Lista Racing (United States) Doran Matthews Racing	Ferrari 333 SP	Ferrari F310E 4.0 L V12	M	36	(United States) Jim Matthews	All
(United States) Doran Lista Racing (United States) Doran Matthews Racing	Ferrari 333 SP	Ferrari F310E 4.0 L V12	M	36	(United States) Tommy Kendall	1–2
(United States) Doran Lista Racing (United States) Doran Matthews Racing	Ferrari 333 SP	Ferrari F310E 4.0 L V12	M	36	(United States) Mark Dismore	1
(United States) Doran Lista Racing (United States) Doran Matthews Racing	Ferrari 333 SP	Ferrari F310E 4.0 L V12	M	36	(United States) Anthony Lazzaro	3
(United States) Doran Lista Racing (United States) Doran Matthews Racing	Ferrari 333 SP	Ferrari F310E 4.0 L V12	M	36	(Sweden) Stefan Johansson	4–8
(United States) Doran Lista Racing (United States) Doran Matthews Racing	Ferrari 333 SP	Ferrari F310E 4.0 L V12	M	36	(New Zealand) Scott Dixon	6
(United States) Intersport Racing	Lola B98/10	Ford (Roush) 6.0 L V8	G	28	(United States) Jon Field	All
(United States) Intersport Racing	Lola B98/10	Ford (Roush) 6.0 L V8	G	28	(United States) Ryan Jones	1–2, 6
(United States) Intersport Racing	Lola B98/10	Ford (Roush) 6.0 L V8	G	28	(United Kingdom) Chris Goodwin	1
(United States) Intersport Racing	Lola B98/10	Ford (Roush) 6.0 L V8	G	28	(Canada) Martin Guimont	3
(United States) Intersport Racing	Lola B98/10	Ford (Roush) 6.0 L V8	G	28	(Sweden) Niclas Jönsson	4–6, 8
(United States) Intersport Racing	Lola B98/10	Ford (Roush) 6.0 L V8	G	28	(United States) Paul Debban	7
(United States) Intersport Racing	Riley & Scott Mk III	Ford 5.0 L V8	G	29	(United States) John Mirro	1–4, 6
(United States) Intersport Racing	Riley & Scott Mk III	Ford 5.0 L V8	G	29	(United States) Sam Brown	1–4
(United States) Intersport Racing	Riley & Scott Mk III	Ford 5.0 L V8	G	29	(United States) Butch Brickell	1
(United States) Intersport Racing	Riley & Scott Mk III	Ford 5.0 L V8	G	29	(United States) Andy Petery	1
(United States) Intersport Racing	Riley & Scott Mk III	Ford 5.0 L V8	G	29	(United States) Paul Debban	5
(United States) Intersport Racing	Riley & Scott Mk III	Ford 5.0 L V8	G	29	(United States) Bruce Trenery	5
(United States) Intersport Racing	Riley & Scott Mk III	Ford 5.0 L V8	G	29	(United States) Tim Hubman	6
(United States) Intersport Racing	Riley & Scott Mk III	Ford 5.0 L V8	G	29	(United States) Vic Rice	6–7
(United States) Intersport Racing	Riley & Scott Mk III	Ford 5.0 L V8	G	29	(United States) Spencer Trenery	7–8
(United States) Genesis Racing	Riley & Scott Mk III	Ford 5.0 L V8	G	31	(United States) Rick Fairbanks	1
(United States) Genesis Racing	Riley & Scott Mk III	Ford 5.0 L V8	G	31	(United States) Dave Dullum	1
(United States) Genesis Racing	Riley & Scott Mk III	Ford 5.0 L V8	G	31	(United States) Kurt Baumann	1
(United States) Genesis Racing	Hawk MD3R	Chevrolet 6.0 L V8	G	32	(United States) Jeff Altenburg	1–2
(United States) Genesis Racing	Hawk MD3R	Chevrolet 6.0 L V8	G	32	(United States) Rick Fairbanks	1–2
(United States) Genesis Racing	Hawk MD3R	Chevrolet 6.0 L V8	G	32	(United States) Chuck Goldsborough	1
(United States) Nygmatech Motorsports	Riley & Scott Mk III	Ford 5.0 L V8	G	31	(United States) Kurt Baumann	6–7
(United States) Nygmatech Motorsports	Riley & Scott Mk III	Ford 5.0 L V8	G	31	(United States) Tony Kester	6
(United States) Nygmatech Motorsports	Riley & Scott Mk III	Ford 5.0 L V8	G	31	(United States) Dave Dullum	6
(United States) Nygmatech Motorsports	Riley & Scott Mk III	Ford 5.0 L V8	G	31	(United States) Stan Wattles	7
(United States) Champion Racing	Porsche 911 GT1 Evo	Porsche 3.2 L Turbo Flat-6	M	38	(France) Bob Wollek	1–2, 6
(United States) Champion Racing	Porsche 911 GT1 Evo	Porsche 3.2 L Turbo Flat-6	M	38	(Belgium) Thierry Boutsen	1–2
(United States) Champion Racing	Porsche 911 GT1 Evo	Porsche 3.2 L Turbo Flat-6	M	38	(Germany) Dirk Müller	1
(United States) Champion Racing	Porsche 911 GT1 Evo	Porsche 3.2 L Turbo Flat-6	M	38	(United Kingdom) Allan McNish	3–8
(United States) Champion Racing	Porsche 911 GT1 Evo	Porsche 3.2 L Turbo Flat-6	M	38	(Germany) Ralf Kelleners	3, 6–8
(United States) Champion Racing	Porsche 911 GT1 Evo	Porsche 3.2 L Turbo Flat-6	M	38	(United States) Andy Pilgrim	4–5
(Germany) BMW Motorsport (Germany) Schnitzer Motorsport	BMW V12 LMR	BMW S70 6.0 L V12	M	42	(Finland) J.J. Lehto	1, 3–8
(Germany) BMW Motorsport (Germany) Schnitzer Motorsport	BMW V12 LMR	BMW S70 6.0 L V12	M	42	(Germany) Jörg Müller	1, 3, 6
(Germany) BMW Motorsport (Germany) Schnitzer Motorsport	BMW V12 LMR	BMW S70 6.0 L V12	M	42	(Denmark) Tom Kristensen	1
(Germany) BMW Motorsport (Germany) Schnitzer Motorsport	BMW V12 LMR	BMW S70 6.0 L V12	M	42	(United Kingdom) Steve Soper	4–5, 7–8
(Germany) BMW Motorsport (Germany) Schnitzer Motorsport	BMW V12 LMR	BMW S70 6.0 L V12	M	43	(Germany) Joachim Winkelhock	1, 3–8
(Germany) BMW Motorsport (Germany) Schnitzer Motorsport	BMW V12 LMR	BMW S70 6.0 L V12	M	43	(France) Yannick Dalmas	1
(Germany) BMW Motorsport (Germany) Schnitzer Motorsport	BMW V12 LMR	BMW S70 6.0 L V12	M	43	(Italy) Pierluigi Martini	1
(Germany) BMW Motorsport (Germany) Schnitzer Motorsport	BMW V12 LMR	BMW S70 6.0 L V12	M	43	(United States) Bill Auberlen	3–8
(Germany) BMW Motorsport (Germany) Schnitzer Motorsport	BMW V12 LMR	BMW S70 6.0 L V12	M	43	(United Kingdom) Steve Soper	6
(Japan) Autoexe Motorsports	Autoexe LMP99	Ford 6.0 L V8	Y	44	(France) Franck Fréon	1
(Japan) Autoexe Motorsports	Autoexe LMP99	Ford 6.0 L V8	Y	44	(Japan) Yojiro Terada	1
(United States) Banshee Racing	Banshee Mark 2	Ford ??	?	47	(United States) Tony Ave	2*
(United States) Banshee Racing	Banshee Mark 2	Ford ??	?	47	(Canada) Ernie Lader	2*
(United States) Banshee Racing	Banshee Mark 2	Ford ??	?	47	(Canada) Scott Goodyear	2*
(United States) Kopf Precision	Keiler KII	Ford 5.0L V8	G	60	(United States) Kris Wilson	1, 4
(United States) Kopf Precision	Keiler KII	Ford 5.0L V8	G	60	(United States) Tim Moser	1, 4
(United States) Downing/Atlanta	Kudzu DLM	Mazda 2.0 L 3-Rotor	G	62	(United States) Rich Grupp	1–2, 6
(United States) Downing/Atlanta	Kudzu DLM	Mazda 2.0 L 3-Rotor	G	62	(United States) Dennis Spencer	1–2, 6
(United States) Downing/Atlanta	Kudzu DLM	Mazda 2.0 L 3-Rotor	G	62	(United States) A.J. Smith	1
(United States) Downing/Atlanta	Kudzu DLM	Mazda 2.0 L 3-Rotor	G	62	(United States) Barry Waddell	6
(United States) Downing/Atlanta	Kudzu DLY	Mazda R26B 2.6 L 4-Rotor	G	63	(United States) Jim Downing	1–6
(United States) Downing/Atlanta	Kudzu DLY	Mazda R26B 2.6 L 4-Rotor	G	63	(United States) Chris Ronson	1, 4–5
(United States) Downing/Atlanta	Kudzu DLY	Mazda R26B 2.6 L 4-Rotor	G	63	(United States) Steve Pelke	1
(United States) Downing/Atlanta	Kudzu DLY	Mazda R26B 2.6 L 4-Rotor	G	63	(United States) Howard Katz	2, 6
(United States) Downing/Atlanta	Kudzu DLY	Mazda R26B 2.6 L 4-Rotor	G	63	(United States) A.J. Smith	3
(United States) Downing/Atlanta	Kudzu DLY	Mazda R26B 2.6 L 4-Rotor	G	63	(France) Franck Fréon	6
(Germany) Konrad Motorsport	Lola B98/10	Lotus 3.5 L Turbo V8 (Rd. 1) Ford 5.0L V8 (Rd. 6)	D	66	(Netherlands) Jan Lammers	1, 6*
(Germany) Konrad Motorsport	Lola B98/10	Lotus 3.5 L Turbo V8 (Rd. 1) Ford 5.0L V8 (Rd. 6)	D	66	(Austria) Franz Konrad	1
(Germany) Konrad Motorsport	Lola B98/10	Lotus 3.5 L Turbo V8 (Rd. 1) Ford 5.0L V8 (Rd. 6)	D	66	(United States) Tim Hubman	1
(Germany) Konrad Motorsport	Lola B98/10	Lotus 3.5 L Turbo V8 (Rd. 1) Ford 5.0L V8 (Rd. 6)	D	66	(Netherlands) Mike Hezemans	6*
(Germany) Spreng Racing	Spice HC94	Chevrolet ??	?	69	(Germany) Gustl Spreng	1*
(Germany) Spreng Racing	Spice HC94	Chevrolet ??	?	69	(Germany) Kersten Jodexnis	1*
(United States) Robinson Racing	Riley & Scott Mk III	Chevrolet 6.0 L V8	G	74	(United States) George Robinson	1–2, 4–6
(United States) Robinson Racing	Riley & Scott Mk III	Chevrolet 6.0 L V8	G	74	(United States) Jack Baldwin	1–2, 4–6
(United States) Robinson Racing	Riley & Scott Mk III	Chevrolet 6.0 L V8	G	74	(United States) Irv Hoerr	1, 6
(France) DAMS	Lola B98/10	Judd GV4 4.0 L V10	P	75	(France) Jean-Marc Gounon	3, 6–8
(France) DAMS	Lola B98/10	Judd GV4 4.0 L V10	P	75	(France) Franck Montagny	3, 6–8
(France) DAMS	Lola B98/10	Judd GV4 4.0 L V10	P	75	(France) Christophe Tinseau	6
(Germany) Audi Sport Team Joest	Audi R8R	Audi 3.6 L Turbo V8	M	77	(Italy) Michele Alboreto	1
(Germany) Audi Sport Team Joest	Audi R8R	Audi 3.6 L Turbo V8	M	77	(Italy) Rinaldo Capello	1
(Germany) Audi Sport Team Joest	Audi R8R	Audi 3.6 L Turbo V8	M	77	(Sweden) Stefan Johansson	1
(Germany) Audi Sport Team Joest	Audi R8R	Audi 3.6 L Turbo V8	M	78	(Italy) Emanuele Pirro	1
(Germany) Audi Sport Team Joest	Audi R8R	Audi 3.6 L Turbo V8	M	78	(Germany) Frank Biela	1
(Germany) Audi Sport Team Joest	Audi R8R	Audi 3.6 L Turbo V8	M	78	(United Kingdom) Perry McCarthy	1
(United States) TRV Motorsport	Riley & Scott Mk III	Chevrolet 6.0 L V8	Y(1–2) G(6–7)	95	(United States) Jeret Schroeder	1–2, 6–7
(United States) TRV Motorsport	Riley & Scott Mk III	Chevrolet 6.0 L V8	Y(1–2) G(6–7)	95	(United States) Tom Volk	1–2, 6–7
(United States) TRV Motorsport	Riley & Scott Mk III	Chevrolet 6.0 L V8	Y(1–2) G(6–7)	95	(United States) Pete Halsmer	1
(United States) TRV Motorsport	Riley & Scott Mk III	Chevrolet 6.0 L V8	Y(1–2) G(6–7)	95	(United States) Barry Waddell	1
(United States) TRV Motorsport	Riley & Scott Mk III	Chevrolet 6.0 L V8	Y(1–2) G(6–7)	95	(United States) Lyn St. James	6
(United States) Team Cascadia	Lola B98/12	BMW 4.0 L V8 (Rd. 1) Chevrolet 6.0 L V8 (Rd. 4–5)	P	97	(United States) Shane Lewis	1, 4–5
(United States) Team Cascadia	Lola B98/12	BMW 4.0 L V8 (Rd. 1) Chevrolet 6.0 L V8 (Rd. 4–5)	P	97	(United States) Ed Zabinski	1, 4–5
(United States) Team Cascadia	Lola B98/12	BMW 4.0 L V8 (Rd. 1) Chevrolet 6.0 L V8 (Rd. 4–5)	P	97	(United States) Vic Rice	1

AMG-Mercedes had planned on entering their Mercedes-Benz CLR into the final three races of the season but cancelled their Sportscar program after a disastrous performance at Le Mans.

=== Grand Touring Sport (GTS) ===
Team	Chassis	Engine	Tyre	No.	Drivers	Rnds.
(United States) CJ Motorsport	Porsche 911 GT2	Porsche 3.6 L Turbo Flat-6	Y	04	(United States) John Morton	1–6
(United States) CJ Motorsport	Porsche 911 GT2	Porsche 3.6 L Turbo Flat-6	Y	04	(Canada) John Graham	1–6
(United States) CJ Motorsport	Porsche 911 GT2	Porsche 3.6 L Turbo Flat-6	Y	04	(United States) Davy Jones	1
(United States) Roock Motorsport North America	Porsche 911 GT2	Porsche 3.8 L Turbo Flat-6	Y	08	(Germany) Claudia Hürtgen	6–8
(United States) Roock Motorsport North America	Porsche 911 GT2	Porsche 3.8 L Turbo Flat-6	Y	08	(Germany) André Ahrlé	6–8
(United States) Roock Motorsport North America	Porsche 911 GT2	Porsche 3.8 L Turbo Flat-6	Y	08	(Germany) Hubert Haupt	6
(United States) Corvette Racing (United States) Riley & Scott Inc.	Chevrolet Corvette C5-R	Chevrolet 6.0 L V8	G	3	(Canada) Ron Fellows	1, 4, 6–8
(United States) Corvette Racing (United States) Riley & Scott Inc.	Chevrolet Corvette C5-R	Chevrolet 6.0 L V8	G	3	(United States) Chris Kneifel	1, 4, 6–8
(United States) Corvette Racing (United States) Riley & Scott Inc.	Chevrolet Corvette C5-R	Chevrolet 6.0 L V8	G	3	(United States) John Paul Jr.	1, 6
(United States) Corvette Racing (United States) Riley & Scott Inc.	Chevrolet Corvette C5-R	Chevrolet 6.0 L V8	G	4	(United States) Andy Pilgrim	1, 6
(United States) Corvette Racing (United States) Riley & Scott Inc.	Chevrolet Corvette C5-R	Chevrolet 6.0 L V8	G	4	(United States) Scott Sharp	1, 6
(United States) Corvette Racing (United States) Riley & Scott Inc.	Chevrolet Corvette C5-R	Chevrolet 6.0 L V8	G	4	(United States) John Heinricy	1
(United States) Corvette Racing (United States) Riley & Scott Inc.	Chevrolet Corvette C5-R	Chevrolet 6.0 L V8	G	4	(United States) Kelly Collins	6
(United Kingdom) Chamberlain Motorsport	Chrysler Viper GTS-R	Chrysler 8.0 L V10	M	19	(Belgium) Didier Defourny	6
(United Kingdom) Chamberlain Motorsport	Chrysler Viper GTS-R	Chrysler 8.0 L V10	M	19	(Netherlands) Hans Hugenholtz	6
(United Kingdom) Chamberlain Motorsport	Chrysler Viper GTS-R	Chrysler 8.0 L V10	M	19	(Japan) Seiji Ara	6
(United States) ITLA Capital Corp. Intruder	Mosler Intruder	Chevrolet ??	?	33	(United States) Vic Rice	7*
(United States) ITLA Capital Corp. Intruder	Mosler Intruder	Chevrolet ??	?	33	(United States) Spencer Trenery	7*
(Germany) Freisinger Motorsport	Porsche 911 GT2	Porsche 3.6 L Turbo Flat-6	D	48	(Germany) Wolfgang Kaufmann	1, 4–7
(Germany) Freisinger Motorsport	Porsche 911 GT2	Porsche 3.6 L Turbo Flat-6	D	48	(France) Michel Ligonnet	1, 4–6
(Germany) Freisinger Motorsport	Porsche 911 GT2	Porsche 3.6 L Turbo Flat-6	D	48	(United States) Lance Stewart	1
(Germany) Freisinger Motorsport	Porsche 911 GT2	Porsche 3.6 L Turbo Flat-6	D	48	(France) Bob Wollek	7
(Germany) Freisinger Motorsport	Porsche 911 GT2	Porsche 3.6 L Turbo Flat-6	D	49	(Germany) Michael Irmgratz	1
(Germany) Freisinger Motorsport	Porsche 911 GT2	Porsche 3.6 L Turbo Flat-6	D	49	(Austria) Mandfred Jurasz	1
(Germany) Freisinger Motorsport	Porsche 911 GT2	Porsche 3.6 L Turbo Flat-6	D	49	(United States Virgin Islands) Brad Creger	1
(Germany) Freisinger Motorsport	Porsche 911 GT2	Porsche 3.6 L Turbo Flat-6	D	49	(United States) Lance Stewart	6
(Germany) Freisinger Motorsport	Porsche 911 GT2	Porsche 3.6 L Turbo Flat-6	D	49	(Japan) Yukihiro Hane	6
(United States) Johnson Autosport	Porsche 911 Turbo	Porsche 3.6 L Turbo Flat-6	?	50	(United States) Tim McGlynn	1–2
(United States) Johnson Autosport	Porsche 911 Turbo	Porsche 3.6 L Turbo Flat-6	?	50	(United States) Robert Johnson	1–2
(United States) Johnson Autosport	Porsche 911 Turbo	Porsche 3.6 L Turbo Flat-6	?	50	(United States) Mike Hoke	1
(United States) Johnson Autosport	Porsche 911 Turbo	Porsche 3.6 L Turbo Flat-6	?	50	(United States) Jack Lewis	2
(United States) Maxwell Racing	Porsche 911 GT2	Porsche 3.6 L Turbo Flat-6	Y	52	(United States) Harry Rady	7
(United States) Maxwell Racing	Porsche 911 GT2	Porsche 3.6 L Turbo Flat-6	Y	52	(United States) Cary Eisenlohr	7
(United States) Saleen/Allen Speedlab	Saleen Mustang SR	Ford 5.8 L V8	P	55	(United States) Terry Borcheller	All
(United States) Saleen/Allen Speedlab	Saleen Mustang SR	Ford 5.8 L V8	P	55	(United States) Ron Johnson	All
(United States) Saleen/Allen Speedlab	Saleen Mustang SR	Ford 5.8 L V8	P	55	(United States) Steve Saleen	1
(United States) Saleen/Allen Speedlab	Saleen Mustang SR	Ford 5.8 L V8	P	55	(United States) Darren Law	1
(United States) Saleen/Allen Speedlab	Saleen Mustang SR	Ford 5.8 L V8	P	55	(United States) Shane Lewis	6
(United States) Martin Snow Racing	Porsche 911 GT2	Porsche 3.6 L Turbo Flat-6	M	56	(United States) Martin Snow	All
(United States) Martin Snow Racing	Porsche 911 GT2	Porsche 3.6 L Turbo Flat-6	M	56	(United States) Melanie Snow	1
(United States) Martin Snow Racing	Porsche 911 GT2	Porsche 3.6 L Turbo Flat-6	M	56	(Netherlands) Patrick Huisman	1
(United States) Martin Snow Racing	Porsche 911 GT2	Porsche 3.6 L Turbo Flat-6	M	56	(United States) Kelly Collins	2–5, 7–8
(United States) Martin Snow Racing	Porsche 911 GT2	Porsche 3.6 L Turbo Flat-6	M	56	(United States) Larry Schumacher	6
(United States) Martin Snow Racing	Porsche 911 GT2	Porsche 3.6 L Turbo Flat-6	M	56	(United States) John O'Steen	6
(Germany) Konrad Motorsport	Porsche 911 GT2	Porsche 3.6 L Turbo Flat-6	D	61	(United States) Peter Kitchak	1–3
(Germany) Konrad Motorsport	Porsche 911 GT2	Porsche 3.6 L Turbo Flat-6	D	61	(United States) Charles Slater	1, 6, 8
(Germany) Konrad Motorsport	Porsche 911 GT2	Porsche 3.6 L Turbo Flat-6	D	61	(Netherlands) Mike Hezemans	1
(Germany) Konrad Motorsport	Porsche 911 GT2	Porsche 3.6 L Turbo Flat-6	D	61	(Austria) Franz Konrad	2, 4–5, 7–8
(Germany) Konrad Motorsport	Porsche 911 GT2	Porsche 3.6 L Turbo Flat-6	D	61	(France) Bob Wollek	4–5
(Germany) Konrad Motorsport	Porsche 911 GT2	Porsche 3.6 L Turbo Flat-6	D	61	(Belgium) Michel Neugarten	6
(Germany) Konrad Motorsport	Porsche 911 GT2	Porsche 3.6 L Turbo Flat-6	D	61	(United States) Tom McGlynn	6
(Germany) Konrad Motorsport	Porsche 911 GT2	Porsche 3.6 L Turbo Flat-6	D	61	(Italy) Simon Sobrero	7–8
(United States) DM Motorsports	Porsche 911 GT2 Evo	Porsche 3.8 L Turbo Flat-6	?	71	(United States) Arthur Pilla	1
(United States) DM Motorsports	Porsche 911 GT2 Evo	Porsche 3.8 L Turbo Flat-6	?	71	(United States) Bob Mazzuoccola	1
(United States) DM Motorsports	Porsche 911 GT2 Evo	Porsche 3.8 L Turbo Flat-6	?	71	(United States) David Kicak	1
(United States) DM Motorsports	Porsche 911 GT2 Evo	Porsche 3.8 L Turbo Flat-6	?	71	(United States) Mark Montgomery	1
(United States) ARBJH Development (United States) Chiefie Motorsports	Porsche 911 GT2	Porsche 3.6 L Turbo Flat-6	P	83	(United States) Zak Brown	All
(United States) ARBJH Development (United States) Chiefie Motorsports	Porsche 911 GT2	Porsche 3.6 L Turbo Flat-6	P	83	(Germany) Claudia Hürtgen	1
(United States) ARBJH Development (United States) Chiefie Motorsports	Porsche 911 GT2	Porsche 3.6 L Turbo Flat-6	P	83	(Germany) Hubert Haupt	1
(United States) ARBJH Development (United States) Chiefie Motorsports	Porsche 911 GT2	Porsche 3.6 L Turbo Flat-6	P	83	(United States) Andy Pilgrim	2–3
(United States) ARBJH Development (United States) Chiefie Motorsports	Porsche 911 GT2	Porsche 3.6 L Turbo Flat-6	P	83	(Italy) Stefano Buttiero	4–5, 7–8
(United States) ARBJH Development (United States) Chiefie Motorsports	Porsche 911 GT2	Porsche 3.6 L Turbo Flat-6	P	83	(United States) Joe Foster	6
(United States) ARBJH Development (United States) Chiefie Motorsports	Porsche 911 GT2	Porsche 3.6 L Turbo Flat-6	P	83	(United States) Michael Schrom	6
(France) Dodge Viper Team Oreca	Dodge Viper GTS-R	Dodge 8.0 L V10	M	91	(Monaco) Olivier Beretta	3–8
(France) Dodge Viper Team Oreca	Dodge Viper GTS-R	Dodge 8.0 L V10	M	91	(United States) David Donohue	3–6, 8
(France) Dodge Viper Team Oreca	Dodge Viper GTS-R	Dodge 8.0 L V10	M	91	(Belgium) Marc Duez	3
(France) Dodge Viper Team Oreca	Dodge Viper GTS-R	Dodge 8.0 L V10	M	91	(Austria) Karl Wendlinger	7
(France) Dodge Viper Team Oreca	Dodge Viper GTS-R	Dodge 8.0 L V10	M	92	(United States) Tommy Archer	3–8
(France) Dodge Viper Team Oreca	Dodge Viper GTS-R	Dodge 8.0 L V10	M	92	(Austria) Karl Wendlinger	3–6, 8
(France) Dodge Viper Team Oreca	Dodge Viper GTS-R	Dodge 8.0 L V10	M	92	(France) Jean-Philippe Belloc	3
(France) Dodge Viper Team Oreca	Dodge Viper GTS-R	Dodge 8.0 L V10	M	92	(United States) David Donohue	7
(France) Dodge Viper Team Oreca	Dodge Viper GTS-R	Dodge 8.0 L V10	M	93	(Portugal) Ni Amorim	6
(France) Dodge Viper Team Oreca	Dodge Viper GTS-R	Dodge 8.0 L V10	M	93	(United Kingdom) Justin Bell	6
(France) Dodge Viper Team Oreca	Dodge Viper GTS-R	Dodge 8.0 L V10	M	93	(France) Emmanuel Clérico	6
(United States) Schumacher Racing	Porsche 911 GT2	Porsche 3.6 L Turbo Flat-6	M	99	(United States) Larry Schumacher	1–2
(United States) Schumacher Racing	Porsche 911 GT2	Porsche 3.6 L Turbo Flat-6	M	99	(United States) John O'Steen	1–2
(United States) Schumacher Racing	Porsche 911 GT2	Porsche 3.6 L Turbo Flat-6	M	99	(United States) Robert Nearn	1

=== Grand Touring (GT) ===
Team	Chassis	Engine	Tyre	No.	Drivers	Rnds.
(United States) Reiser Callas Rennsport	Porsche 911 Carrera RSR	Porsche 3.8 L Flat-6	P	02	(United States) David Murry	1–2, 4–8
(United States) Reiser Callas Rennsport	Porsche 911 Carrera RSR	Porsche 3.8 L Flat-6	P	02	(United Kingdom) Johnny Mowlem	1, 3, 6–8
(United States) Reiser Callas Rennsport	Porsche 911 Carrera RSR	Porsche 3.8 L Flat-6	P	02	(United States) John Ruther	1*
(United States) Reiser Callas Rennsport	Porsche 911 Carrera RSR	Porsche 3.8 L Flat-6	P	02	(United States) Craig Stanton	2–3
(United States) Reiser Callas Rennsport	Porsche 911 Carrera RSR	Porsche 3.8 L Flat-6	P	02	(United States) Doc Bundy	4–5
(United States) Reiser Callas Rennsport	Porsche 911 Carrera RSR	Porsche 3.8 L Flat-6	P	02	(United States) Hurley Haywood	6
(United States) Reiser Callas Rennsport	Porsche 911 Carrera RSR	Porsche 3.8 L Flat-6	P	03	(United States) Grady Willingham	1–3, 5–8
(United States) Reiser Callas Rennsport	Porsche 911 Carrera RSR	Porsche 3.8 L Flat-6	P	03	(United States) Craig Stanton	1, 4–8
(United States) Reiser Callas Rennsport	Porsche 911 Carrera RSR	Porsche 3.8 L Flat-6	P	03	(United States) Joel Reiser	1, 3–8
(United States) Reiser Callas Rennsport	Porsche 911 Carrera RSR	Porsche 3.8 L Flat-6	P	03	(France) Michel Ligonnet	2
(United States) G & W Motorsports	Porsche 911 GT2 Evo (Rd. 1–2) Porsche 911 Carrera RSR (Rd. 6)	Porsche 3.8 L Turbo Flat-6 (Rd. 1–2) Porsche 3.8 L Flat-6 (Rd. 6)	P	07	(United States) Steve Marshall	1–2, 6
(United States) G & W Motorsports	Porsche 911 GT2 Evo (Rd. 1–2) Porsche 911 Carrera RSR (Rd. 6)	Porsche 3.8 L Turbo Flat-6 (Rd. 1–2) Porsche 3.8 L Flat-6 (Rd. 6)	P	07	(United States) Danny Marshall	1–2, 6
(United States) G & W Motorsports	Porsche 911 GT2 Evo (Rd. 1–2) Porsche 911 Carrera RSR (Rd. 6)	Porsche 3.8 L Turbo Flat-6 (Rd. 1–2) Porsche 3.8 L Flat-6 (Rd. 6)	P	07	(United States) Darren Law	1–2
(United States) G & W Motorsports	Porsche 911 GT2 Evo (Rd. 1–2) Porsche 911 Carrera RSR (Rd. 6)	Porsche 3.8 L Turbo Flat-6 (Rd. 1–2) Porsche 3.8 L Flat-6 (Rd. 6)	P	07	(Canada) Sylvain Tremblay	1
(United States) G & W Motorsports	Porsche 911 GT2 Evo (Rd. 1–2) Porsche 911 Carrera RSR (Rd. 6)	Porsche 3.8 L Turbo Flat-6 (Rd. 1–2) Porsche 3.8 L Flat-6 (Rd. 6)	P	07	(United Kingdom) Chris Hall	6
(United States) Prototype Technology Group	BMW M3 (E36)	BMW 3.2 L I6	Y	6	(United States) Mark Simo	2–5
(United States) Prototype Technology Group	BMW M3 (E36)	BMW 3.2 L I6	Y	6	(United States) Peter Cunningham	2–5
(United States) Prototype Technology Group	BMW M3 (E36)	BMW 3.2 L I6	Y	6	(United States) Brian Cunningham	4
(United States) Prototype Technology Group	BMW M3 (E36)	BMW 3.2 L I6	Y	6	(Germany) Hans-Joachim Stuck	6–8
(United States) Prototype Technology Group	BMW M3 (E36)	BMW 3.2 L I6	Y	6	(United States) Boris Said	6–7
(United States) Prototype Technology Group	BMW M3 (E36)	BMW 3.2 L I6	Y	6	(United States) Johannes van Overbeek	8
(United States) Prototype Technology Group	BMW M3 (E36)	BMW 3.2 L I6	Y	7	(United States) Brian Cunningham	All
(United States) Prototype Technology Group	BMW M3 (E36)	BMW 3.2 L I6	Y	7	(United States) Johannes van Overbeek	1–3
(United States) Prototype Technology Group	BMW M3 (E36)	BMW 3.2 L I6	Y	7	(United States) Mark Simo	1, 6–7
(United States) Prototype Technology Group	BMW M3 (E36)	BMW 3.2 L I6	Y	7	(Germany) Christian Menzel	4–5
(United States) Prototype Technology Group	BMW M3 (E36)	BMW 3.2 L I6	Y	7	(United States) Peter Cunningham	8
(United States) Prototype Technology Group	BMW M3 (E36)	BMW 3.2 L I6	Y	9	(Germany) Hans-Joachim Stuck	4–5
(United States) Prototype Technology Group	BMW M3 (E36)	BMW 3.2 L I6	Y	9	(United States) Boris Said	4–5
(United States) Prototype Technology Group	BMW M3 (E36)	BMW 3.2 L I6	Y	10	(Germany) Hans-Joachim Stuck	1–3
(United States) Prototype Technology Group	BMW M3 (E36)	BMW 3.2 L I6	Y	10	(United States) Boris Said	1–2, 8
(United States) Prototype Technology Group	BMW M3 (E36)	BMW 3.2 L I6	Y	10	(United States) Peter Cunningham	1, 7
(United States) Prototype Technology Group	BMW M3 (E36)	BMW 3.2 L I6	Y	10	(Germany) Christian Menzel	3
(United States) Prototype Technology Group	BMW M3 (E36)	BMW 3.2 L I6	Y	10	(United States) Johannes van Overbeek	4–7
(United States) Prototype Technology Group	BMW M3 (E36)	BMW 3.2 L I6	Y	10	(United States) Darren Law	4–6
(United States) Prototype Technology Group	BMW M3 (E36)	BMW 3.2 L I6	Y	10	(United States) Mark Simo	8
(United States) Aasco Performance (United States) Contemporary Motorsports	Porsche 911 Carrera RSR	Porsche 3.8 L Flat-6	P	17	(United States) Mike Conte	1, 3–4, 6–8
(United States) Aasco Performance (United States) Contemporary Motorsports	Porsche 911 Carrera RSR	Porsche 3.8 L Flat-6	P	17	(Belgium) Bruno Lambert	1, 4–7
(United States) Aasco Performance (United States) Contemporary Motorsports	Porsche 911 Carrera RSR	Porsche 3.8 L Flat-6	P	17	(United Kingdom) Nick Holt	1, 3
(United States) Aasco Performance (United States) Contemporary Motorsports	Porsche 911 Carrera RSR	Porsche 3.8 L Flat-6	P	17	(United States) Joe Varde	5
(United States) Aasco Performance (United States) Contemporary Motorsports	Porsche 911 Carrera RSR	Porsche 3.8 L Flat-6	P	17	(United States) Randy Pobst	8
(United States) Alex Job Racing	Porsche 911 Carrera RSR	Porsche 3.8 L Flat-6	Y	22	(United States) Mike Fitzgerald	All
(United States) Alex Job Racing	Porsche 911 Carrera RSR	Porsche 3.8 L Flat-6	Y	22	(United States) Randy Pobst	1, 6
(United States) Alex Job Racing	Porsche 911 Carrera RSR	Porsche 3.8 L Flat-6	Y	22	(United States) David MacNeil	1
(United States) Alex Job Racing	Porsche 911 Carrera RSR	Porsche 3.8 L Flat-6	Y	22	(United States) Darryl Havens	2–8
(United States) Alex Job Racing (Germany) Manthey Racing	Porsche 911 Carrera RSR (1–3) Porsche 996 GT3-R (4–8)	Porsche 3.8 L Flat-6 (1–3) Porsche 3.6 L Flat-6 (4–8)	Y(1–3) M(4–8)	23	(United States) Cort Wagner	All
(United States) Alex Job Racing (Germany) Manthey Racing	Porsche 911 Carrera RSR (1–3) Porsche 996 GT3-R (4–8)	Porsche 3.8 L Flat-6 (1–3) Porsche 3.6 L Flat-6 (4–8)	Y(1–3) M(4–8)	23	(United States) Kelly Collins	1
(United States) Alex Job Racing (Germany) Manthey Racing	Porsche 911 Carrera RSR (1–3) Porsche 996 GT3-R (4–8)	Porsche 3.8 L Flat-6 (1–3) Porsche 3.6 L Flat-6 (4–8)	Y(1–3) M(4–8)	23	(United States) Darryl Havens	1
(United States) Alex Job Racing (Germany) Manthey Racing	Porsche 911 Carrera RSR (1–3) Porsche 996 GT3-R (4–8)	Porsche 3.8 L Flat-6 (1–3) Porsche 3.6 L Flat-6 (4–8)	Y(1–3) M(4–8)	23	(Germany) Dirk Müller	2–8
(United States) Alex Job Racing (Germany) Manthey Racing	Porsche 911 Carrera RSR (1–3) Porsche 996 GT3-R (4–8)	Porsche 3.8 L Flat-6 (1–3) Porsche 3.6 L Flat-6 (4–8)	Y(1–3) M(4–8)	23	(Germany) Sascha Maassen	6
(United States) Alex Job Racing	Porsche 911 Carrera RSR	Porsche 3.8 L Flat-6	Y	24	(United States) Randy Pobst	4–5
(United States) Alex Job Racing	Porsche 911 Carrera RSR	Porsche 3.8 L Flat-6	Y	24	(United States) Jim Kelly	4–5
(United States) Alex Job Racing	Porsche 911 Carrera RSR	Porsche 3.8 L Flat-6	Y	24	(United States) Don Kitch	4–5
(Germany) RWS Motorsport	Porsche 911 Carrera RSR (1) Porsche 996 GT3-R (4–8)	Porsche 3.8 L Flat-6 (1) Porsche 3.6 L Flat-6 (4–8)	M	25	(Austria) Hans-Jörg Hofer	1, 4–8
(Germany) RWS Motorsport	Porsche 911 Carrera RSR (1) Porsche 996 GT3-R (4–8)	Porsche 3.8 L Flat-6 (1) Porsche 3.6 L Flat-6 (4–8)	M	25	(Italy) Luca Riccitelli	1, 4–6, 8
(Germany) RWS Motorsport	Porsche 911 Carrera RSR (1) Porsche 996 GT3-R (4–8)	Porsche 3.8 L Flat-6 (1) Porsche 3.6 L Flat-6 (4–8)	M	25	(Germany) Günther Blieninger	1
(Germany) RWS Motorsport	Porsche 911 Carrera RSR (1) Porsche 996 GT3-R (4–8)	Porsche 3.8 L Flat-6 (1) Porsche 3.6 L Flat-6 (4–8)	M	25	(Germany) Kirsten Jodexnis	1
(Germany) RWS Motorsport	Porsche 911 Carrera RSR (1) Porsche 996 GT3-R (4–8)	Porsche 3.8 L Flat-6 (1) Porsche 3.6 L Flat-6 (4–8)	M	25	(Netherlands) Patrick Huisman	6
(Germany) RWS Motorsport	Porsche 911 Carrera RSR (1) Porsche 996 GT3-R (4–8)	Porsche 3.8 L Flat-6 (1) Porsche 3.6 L Flat-6 (4–8)	M	25	(Germany) Sascha Maassen	7
(Germany) Gallade	Porsche 911 Carrera RSR	Porsche 3.8 L Flat-6	?	33	(Germany) Ulrich Gallade	1
(Germany) Gallade	Porsche 911 Carrera RSR	Porsche 3.8 L Flat-6	?	33	(Germany) Ulli Richter	1
(Germany) Gallade	Porsche 911 Carrera RSR	Porsche 3.8 L Flat-6	?	33	(Germany) Karl-Heinz Wlazik	1
(United States) Broadfoot Racing	Porsche 911 Carrera RSR	Porsche 3.8 L Flat-6	?	39	(United States) Stephen Earle	1
(United States) Broadfoot Racing	Porsche 911 Carrera RSR	Porsche 3.8 L Flat-6	?	39	(United States) Todd Snyder	1
(United States) Broadfoot Racing	Porsche 911 Carrera RSR	Porsche 3.8 L Flat-6	?	39	(United States) Allan Ziegelman	1
(United States) Broadfoot Racing	Porsche 911 Carrera RSR	Porsche 3.8 L Flat-6	?	39	(United States) Chris Mitchum	1
(United States) Broadfoot Racing	Porsche 944 Turbo	??	?	89	(United States) Caroline Wright	1*
(United States) Broadfoot Racing	Porsche 944 Turbo	??	?	89	(United States) Scott Bove	1*
(United States) Toad Hall Motor Racing	Porsche 911 Carrera RSR	Porsche 3.8 L Flat-6	?	39	(United States) Darren Law	2
(United States) Toad Hall Motor Racing	Porsche 911 Carrera RSR	Porsche 3.8 L Flat-6	?	39	(United States) Erik Johnson	2
(United States) Toad Hall Motor Racing	Porsche 911 Carrera RSR	Porsche 3.8 L Flat-6	?	39	(United States) James Oppenheimer	2
(United States) Team PRC	Porsche 911 GT3 Cup	Porsche 3.6 L Flat-6	G	40	(United States) Scott Peeler	3–7
(United States) Team PRC	Porsche 911 GT3 Cup	Porsche 3.6 L Flat-6	G	40	(United States) Geoff Auberlen	3
(United States) Team PRC	Porsche 911 GT3 Cup	Porsche 3.6 L Flat-6	G	40	(United States) Mike Doolin	4–7
(United States) Team Transenergy	Porsche 911 Carrera RSR	Porsche 3.8 L Flat-6	?	46	(United States) Bill Rollwitz	1–2
(United States) Team Transenergy	Porsche 911 Carrera RSR	Porsche 3.8 L Flat-6	?	46	(United States) Sam Shalala	1–2
(United States) Team Transenergy	Porsche 911 Carrera RSR	Porsche 3.8 L Flat-6	?	46	(United States) Shareef Malnik	1
(United States) Team Transenergy	Porsche 911 Carrera RSR	Porsche 3.8 L Flat-6	?	46	(United States) Andre Toennis	1
(Germany) Freisinger Motorsports	Porsche 911 Supercup	Porsche 3.6 L Flat-6	?	48 96	(United States) John Heinricy	6
(Germany) Freisinger Motorsports	Porsche 911 Supercup	Porsche 3.6 L Flat-6	?	48 96	(United States) Charles Coker	6
(Germany) Freisinger Motorsports	Porsche 911 Supercup	Porsche 3.6 L Flat-6	?	48 96	(United States) Dave White	6
(Germany) Freisinger Motorsports	Porsche 911 Supercup	Porsche 3.6 L Flat-6	?	48 96	(United States) Joe Varde	6*
(Germany) Freisinger Motorsports	Porsche 911 Supercup	Porsche 3.6 L Flat-6	?	48 96	(United States) Kevin Buckler	8
(Germany) Freisinger Motorsports	Porsche 911 Supercup	Porsche 3.6 L Flat-6	?	48 96	(United States) Philip Collin	8
(United States) Aspen Knolls Racing	BMW M3 (E36)	BMW 3.2 L I6	Y	51	(United States) Randy Pobst	2
(United States) Aspen Knolls Racing	BMW M3 (E36)	BMW 3.2 L I6	Y	51	(United States) Shane Lewis	2
(United States) White Lightning Racing	Porsche 911 Carrera RSR	Porsche 3.8 L Flat-6	Y	53	(United States) Dale White	7–8
(United States) White Lightning Racing	Porsche 911 Carrera RSR	Porsche 3.8 L Flat-6	Y	53	(United States) Michael Petersen	7–8
(United States) White Lightning Racing	Porsche 911 Carrera RSR	Porsche 3.8 L Flat-6	Y	53	(United States) Wade Gaughran	8
(United States) Bell Motorsports	BMW M3 (E36)	BMW 3.2 L I6	Y	54	(United States) Stu Hayner	1
(United States) Bell Motorsports	BMW M3 (E36)	BMW 3.2 L I6	Y	54	(United States) Tony Kester	1
(United States) Bell Motorsports	BMW M3 (E36)	BMW 3.2 L I6	Y	54	(United States) Scott Neuman	1
(United States) Bell Motorsports	BMW M3 (E36)	BMW 3.2 L I6	Y	54	(United States) Matt Drendel	1
(United States) Bell Motorsports	BMW M3 (E36)	BMW 3.2 L I6	Y	72	(United States) Leo Hindery	1
(United States) Bell Motorsports	BMW M3 (E36)	BMW 3.2 L I6	Y	72	(United States) Peter Baron	1
(United States) Bell Motorsports	BMW M3 (E36)	BMW 3.2 L I6	Y	72	(United States) James McCormick	1
(United States) Bell Motorsports	BMW M3 (E36)	BMW 3.2 L I6	Y	72	(United States) Gian Luigi Buitoni	1
(United States) Team Pumpelly Racing	Porsche 911 Carrera RSR	Porsche 3.8 L Flat-6	?	64	(United States) Spencer Pumpelly	2, 6
(United States) Team Pumpelly Racing	Porsche 911 Carrera RSR	Porsche 3.8 L Flat-6	?	64	(United States) Allan Ziegelman	2
(United States) Team Pumpelly Racing	Porsche 911 Carrera RSR	Porsche 3.8 L Flat-6	?	64	(United States) Paulo Lima	2
(United States) Team Pumpelly Racing	Porsche 911 Carrera RSR	Porsche 3.8 L Flat-6	?	64	(United States) Jack Lewis	6
(United States) Team Pumpelly Racing	Porsche 911 Carrera RSR	Porsche 3.8 L Flat-6	?	64	(United States) Kurt Mathewson	6
(United States) Pregrid Motorsports	Porsche 911 3.8 Cup	Porsche 3.8 L Flat-6	Y	65	(United States) John Brosius	5, 7
(United States) Pregrid Motorsports	Porsche 911 3.8 Cup	Porsche 3.8 L Flat-6	Y	65	(United States) Jonathan Fay	5, 7
(United States) Pregrid Motorsports	Porsche 911 3.8 Cup	Porsche 3.8 L Flat-6	Y	65	(United States) Randy Pobst	7
(United States) The Racer's Group	Porsche 911 Carrera RSR	Porsche 3.8 L Flat-6	G	67	(United States) Spencer Trenery	4
(United States) The Racer's Group	Porsche 911 Carrera RSR	Porsche 3.8 L Flat-6	G	67	(United States) Michael Schrom	4
(United States) The Racer's Group	Porsche 911 Carrera RSR	Porsche 3.8 L Flat-6	G	67	(United States) Kimberly Hiskey	5, 7
(United States) The Racer's Group	Porsche 911 Carrera RSR	Porsche 3.8 L Flat-6	G	67	(United States) Kim Wolfkill	5
(United States) The Racer's Group	Porsche 911 Carrera RSR	Porsche 3.8 L Flat-6	G	67	(United States) Kevin Buckler	5
(United States) The Racer's Group	Porsche 911 Carrera RSR	Porsche 3.8 L Flat-6	G	67	(United States) John Hill	7
(United States) The Racer's Group	Porsche 911 Carrera RSR	Porsche 3.8 L Flat-6	G	68	(United States) Vic Rice	4–5
(United States) The Racer's Group	Porsche 911 Carrera RSR	Porsche 3.8 L Flat-6	G	68	(United States) Kevin Buckler	4, 7
(United States) The Racer's Group	Porsche 911 Carrera RSR	Porsche 3.8 L Flat-6	G	68	(United States) Spencer Trenery	5
(United States) The Racer's Group	Porsche 911 Carrera RSR	Porsche 3.8 L Flat-6	G	68	(United States) Wade Gaughran	7
(United States) Alegra Motorsports	Porsche 911 Carrera RSR	Porsche 3.8 L Flat-6	P	70	(United States) Scooter Gabel	1, 6
(United States) Alegra Motorsports	Porsche 911 Carrera RSR	Porsche 3.8 L Flat-6	P	70	(United States) Carlos DeQuesada	1, 6
(United States) Alegra Motorsports	Porsche 911 Carrera RSR	Porsche 3.8 L Flat-6	P	70	(United States) Ugo Colombo	1
(United States) Auto Sport South Racing	Porsche 911 Carrera RSR	Porsche 3.8 L Flat-6	G	73	(United States) Kevin Wheeler	1–2, 6
(United States) Auto Sport South Racing	Porsche 911 Carrera RSR	Porsche 3.8 L Flat-6	G	73	(United States) Brady Refenning	1–2, 6
(United States) Auto Sport South Racing	Porsche 911 Carrera RSR	Porsche 3.8 L Flat-6	G	73	(United States) Jack Refenning	1
(United States) Auto Sport South Racing	Porsche 911 Carrera RSR	Porsche 3.8 L Flat-6	G	73	(United States) Jake Vargo	1
(United States) Auto Sport South Racing	Porsche 911 Carrera RSR	Porsche 3.8 L Flat-6	G	73	(United States) Allan Ziegelman	6
(United States) Auto Sport South Racing	Porsche 911 Carrera RSR	Porsche 3.8 L Flat-6	G	73	(United States) Paulo Lima	6
(United States) Team ARE	Porsche 911 Carrera RSR	Porsche 3.8 L Flat-6	Y	76	(United States) Peter Argetsinger	1–3
(United States) Team ARE	Porsche 911 Carrera RSR	Porsche 3.8 L Flat-6	Y	76	(United States) Richard Polidori	1–3
(United States) Team ARE	Porsche 911 Carrera RSR	Porsche 3.8 L Flat-6	Y	76	(Canada) John McCaig	1
(United States) Team ARE	Porsche 911 Carrera RSR	Porsche 3.8 L Flat-6	Y	76	(Italy) Simon Sobrero	4, 6
(United States) Team ARE	Porsche 911 Carrera RSR	Porsche 3.8 L Flat-6	Y	76	(United States) Harry Rady	4
(United States) Team ARE	Porsche 911 Carrera RSR	Porsche 3.8 L Flat-6	Y	76	(Italy) Angelo Cilli	6
(United States) Team ARE	Porsche 911 Carrera RSR	Porsche 3.8 L Flat-6	Y	76	(United States) Geoff Auberlen	6
(United States) Team ARE	Porsche 911 Carrera RSR	Porsche 3.8 L Flat-6	Y	76	(United States) Scott Peeler	8
(United States) Team ARE	Porsche 911 Carrera RSR	Porsche 3.8 L Flat-6	Y	76	(United States) Mike Doolin	8
(United States) Fordahl Motorsports	Porsche 911 Carrera RSR	Porsche 3.8 L Flat-6	?	81	(United States) Steve Valentinetti	8
(United States) Fordahl Motorsports	Porsche 911 Carrera RSR	Porsche 3.8 L Flat-6	?	81	(United States) Kimberly Hiskey	8
(United States) Fordahl Motorsports	Porsche 911 Carrera RSR	Porsche 3.8 L Flat-6	?	81	(United States) John Hill	8
(United States) Specter Werkes/Sports Inc.	Specter Werkes Corvette C5	Chevrolet 7.0 L V8	?	84	(United States) Jeff Nowicki	6*
(United States) Specter Werkes/Sports Inc.	Specter Werkes Corvette C5	Chevrolet 7.0 L V8	?	84	(United States) John Heinricy	6*
(United States) Vanderhoof Racing	Porsche 911 Carrera RSR	Porsche 3.8 L Flat-6	?	88	(United States) Joe Varde	1–2, 4–5
(United States) Vanderhoof Racing	Porsche 911 Carrera RSR	Porsche 3.8 L Flat-6	?	88	(United States) Tim Ralston	1–2, 4–5
(United States) Vanderhoof Racing	Porsche 911 Carrera RSR	Porsche 3.8 L Flat-6	?	88	(United States) Blaise Alexander	1
(United States) Vanderhoof Racing	Porsche 911 Carrera RSR	Porsche 3.8 L Flat-6	?	88	(Costa Rica) Jorge Trejos	5
(United States) Millennium Motorsports	Porsche 911 Carrera RSR	Porsche 3.8 L Flat-6	?	90	(United States) David Friedman	2–3, 7
(United States) Millennium Motorsports	Porsche 911 Carrera RSR	Porsche 3.8 L Flat-6	?	90	(United States) Chris Miller	2, 7
(United States) Millennium Motorsports	Porsche 911 Carrera RSR	Porsche 3.8 L Flat-6	?	90	(United States) Warren Fastenings	3
(United States) GT Team Viper West	Dodge Viper GTS	Chrysler 8.0 L V10	?	96	(United States) Erik Messley	3*
(United States) GT Team Viper West	Dodge Viper GTS	Chrysler 8.0 L V10	?	96	(United States) Ernie Becker	3*

* Was on the entry list but did not participate in the event.

=== Grand Touring Over (GTO) ===
A GTO class had been planned but was cancelled before the start of the season. The following four teams had been on the entry list for the Sebring 12 Hours before the class was cancelled.

Team	Chassis	Engine	Tyre	No.	Drivers
(United States) Wakul Technic	Chevrolet Camaro	Chevrolet V8/90° 2v OHV	?	13	(United States) Dale Walriven
(United States) Wakul Technic	Chevrolet Camaro	Chevrolet V8/90° 2v OHV	?	13	(United States) Mark Walriven
(United States) Rankin Racing, Inc.	Chevrolet Camaro	Chevrolet V8/90° 2v OHV	?	40	(United States) Hank Scott
(United States) Rankin Racing, Inc.	Chevrolet Camaro	Chevrolet V8/90° 2v OHV	?	40	(United States) Toto Lassally
(United States) Rankin Racing, Inc.	Chevrolet Camaro	Chevrolet V8/90° 2v OHV	?	40	(United States) Luis Sereix
(United States) Rankin Racing, Inc.	Chevrolet Camaro	Chevrolet V8/90° 2v OHV	?	40	(United States) David Rankin
(United States) Greer Racing	Oldsmobile Cutlass	Chevrolet 5.3 L V8	?	82	(United States) Dick Greer
(United States) Greer Racing	Oldsmobile Cutlass	Chevrolet 5.3 L V8	?	82	(United States) John Finger
(United States) Greer Racing	Oldsmobile Cutlass	Chevrolet 5.3 L V8	?	82	(United States) John Fergus
(United States) John Annis Racing	Chevrolet Camaro	Chevrolet V8/90° 2v OHV	?	87	(United States) John Annis

== Season results ==
Overall winner in bold.

Rnd	Circuit	LMP Winning Team	GTS Winning Team	GT Winning Team	Results
Rnd	Circuit	LMP Winning Drivers	GTS Winning Drivers	GT Winning Drivers	Results
1	Sebring	**(Germany) #42 BMW Motorsport**	(United States) #56 Martin Snow Racing	(United States) #23 Alex Job Racing	Results
1	Sebring	**(Finland) JJ Lehto** **(Denmark) Tom Kristensen** **(Germany) Jörg Müller**	(United States) Martin Snow (United States) Melanie Snow (Netherlands) Patrick Huisman	(United States) Kelly Collins (United States) Cort Wagner (United States) Darryl Havens	Results
2	Road Atlanta	**(Italy) #0 Team Rafanelli SRL**	(United States) #99 Schumacher Racing	(United States) #7 PTG	Results
2	Road Atlanta	**(Belgium) Eric van de Poele** **(Italy) Mimmo Schiattarella**	(United States) John O'Steen (United States) Larry Schumacher	(United States) Brian Cunningham (United States) Johannes van Overbeek	Results
3	Mosport	**(United States) #2 Panoz Motor Sports**	(France) #91 Dodge Viper Team Oreca	(United States) #23 Alex Job Racing	Results
3	Mosport	**(Denmark) Jan Magnussen** **(United States) Johnny O'Connell**	(Monaco) Olivier Beretta (United States) David Donohue	(Germany) Dirk Müller (United States) Cort Wagner	Results
4	Sears Point	**(Germany) #42 BMW Motorsport**	(France) #91 Dodge Viper Team Oreca	(United States) #9 PTG	Results
4	Sears Point	**(Finland) JJ Lehto** **(United Kingdom) Steve Soper**	(Monaco) Olivier Beretta (United States) David Donohue	(Germany) Hans-Joachim Stuck (United States) Boris Said	Results
5	Portland	**(United States) #1 Panoz Motor Sports**	(France) #91 Dodge Viper Team Oreca	(Germany) #23 Manthey Racing	Results
5	Portland	**(France) Éric Bernard** **(Australia) David Brabham**	(Monaco) Olivier Beretta (United States) David Donohue	(Germany) Dirk Müller (United States) Cort Wagner	Results
6	Road Atlanta	**(United States) #1 Panoz Motor Sports**	(France) #91 Dodge Viper Team Oreca	(Germany) #23 Manthey Racing	Results
6	Road Atlanta	**(France) Éric Bernard** **(Australia) David Brabham** **(United Kingdom) Andy Wallace**	(Monaco) Olivier Beretta (Austria) Karl Wendlinger (Belgium) Marc Duez	(Germany) Dirk Müller (Germany) Sascha Maassen (United States) Cort Wagner	Results
7	Laguna Seca	**(Germany) #42 BMW Motorsport**	(France) #91 Dodge Viper Team Oreca	(United States) #02 Reiser Callas Rennsport	Results
7	Laguna Seca	**(Finland) JJ Lehto** **(United Kingdom) Steve Soper**	(Monaco) Olivier Beretta (Austria) Karl Wendlinger	(United Kingdom) Johnny Mowlem (United States) David Murry	Results
8	Las Vegas	**(Germany) #42 BMW Motorsport**	(France) #92 Dodge Viper Team Oreca	(Germany) #23 Manthey Racing	Results
8	Las Vegas	**(Finland) JJ Lehto** **(United Kingdom) Steve Soper**	(United States) Tommy Archer (Austria) Karl Wendlinger	(Germany) Dirk Müller (United States) Cort Wagner	Results

== Championship standings ==
Points systems
Race	1st	2nd	3rd	4th	5th	6th	7th	8th	9th	10th	11th	12th	13th	14th	15th	16th	17th	18th	19th	FL	lap led
Normal	25	21	19	17	15	14	13	12	11	10	9	8	7	6	5	4	3	2	1	1	1
Sebring	30	26	24	22	20	19	18	17	16	15	14	13	12	11	10	9	8	7	6	1	1

=== LMP Drivers' Championship ===
Bold - Pole position. F - Fastest lap. L - led a lap. M - led the most laps. * - Not awarded points.

Pos.	Driver	Team	SEB (United States)	ATL (United States)	MOS (Canada)	SON (United States)	POR (United States)	PET (United States)	LAG (United States)	LVS (United States)	Pts.
1	(United States) Elliott Forbes-Robinson	(United States) Dyson Racing	2^{L}	3^{L}	4	4	6	4	5	6	141
2	(France) Éric Bernard	(United States) Panoz Motor Sports	25	5^{L}	2	2	1^{L}	**1**^{L}	**8**^{LF}	**10**^{F}	135
2	(Australia) David Brabham	(United States) Panoz Motor Sports	25	5^{L}	2^{F}	2	1^{L}	**1**^{L}	**8**^{L}	**10**^{L}	135
4	(Finland) J.J. Lehto	(Germany) BMW Motorsport	**1**^{L*}		WD	**1**^{LMF}	**2**^{LMF}	3^{LF}	1	1	123
5	(United Kingdom) Steve Soper	(United Kingdom) Price & Bscher	20								122
5	(United Kingdom) Steve Soper	(Germany) BMW Motorsport				**1**^{L}	**2**^{L}	2	1^{ML}	1^{L}	122
6	(Denmark) Jan Magnussen	(United States) Panoz Motor Sports	16	DNS	**1**^{LM}	3	3	5	2^{L}	4^{LM}	121
7	(United States) Johnny O'Connell	(United States) Panoz Motor Sports	16	DNS	**1**^{LM}	3	3	5	2^{L}	4^{L}	120
8	(United States) Butch Leitzinger	(United States) Dyson Racing	2^{L}	3	4	4	21	4		14	110
8	(United States) Butch Leitzinger	(United States) Transatlantic Racing							7		110
9	(United States) Bill Auberlen	(United Kingdom) Price & Bscher	20								95
9	(United States) Bill Auberlen	(Germany) BMW Motorsport			WD	5	4^{L}	2	3^{L}	2	95
10	(United Kingdom) James Weaver	(United States) Dyson Racing	2	**19**	14	13	6	4	5	6	84
11	(Italy) Alex Caffi	(United States) Doyle-Risi Racing	6	6^{L}	7	17	11	19	6	7	83
12	(South Africa) Wayne Taylor	(United States) Doyle-Risi Racing	6	6	7	17	11	19	6	7	82
13	(Sweden) Stefan Johansson	(Germany) Audi Sport Team Joest	3								81
13	(Sweden) Stefan Johansson	(United States) Doran Enterprises				8	12	15	4	5	81
14	(Germany) Joachim Winkelhock	(Germany) BMW Motorsport	19^{L}		WD	5	4	2	3^{L}	2^{L}	79
15	(Belgium) Didier Theys	(United States) Doran Enterprises	24	2^{L}	8	9	19	8	11	12	74
16	(Italy) Max Angelelli	(United States) Doyle-Risi Racing	6	4	5	10	9	18	14	8	71
17	(Belgium) Didier de Radiguès	(United States) Doyle-Risi Racing	29	4	5	10	9	18	14	8	65
18	(United States) Chris Bingham	(United States) Hybrid R&D	7	11	10	15	20		10	9	63
19	(Italy) Mimmo Schiattarella	(Italy) Team Rafanelli SRL		1^{L}	3	6	7	6^{L}	16	16	62
20	(United States) Jim Matthews	(United States) Doran Enterprises	23	7	16	8	12	15	4	5	53
21	(Germany) Jörg Müller	(Germany) BMW Motorsport	**1**^{L}		WD			3^{LM}			52
22	(United States) Scott Schubot	(United States) Transatlantic Racing	10	8		16	17	11	7		49
22	(United States) Jim Downing	(United States) Downing/Atlanta	9	12	11	18	14	10			49
24	(France) Érik Comas	(Italy) Team Rafanelli SRL			3^{L}	6^{L}	7				48
25	(United Kingdom) Allan McNish	(United States) Champion Racing			6	12	8	7	17	15	47
26	(Belgium) Eric van de Poele	(Italy) Team Rafanelli SRL	18^{L}	1^{LMF}				6	16	16	43
27	(Canada) Ross Bentley	(United States) Hybrid R&D	7	11	10	15	20				42
28	(United Kingdom) Andy Wallace	(United States) Dyson Racing	14	**19**^{L}	14	13				14	37
28	(United Kingdom) Andy Wallace	(United States) Panoz Motor Sports						**1**			37
29	(United States) Jon Field	(United States) Intersport Racing	11	17	12	19	13	17	12	13	37
30	(France) Bob Wollek	(United States) Champion Racing	4	18				7			35
31	(United States) Rick Sutherland	(United States) Transatlantic Racing				16		11			34
31	(United States) Rick Sutherland	(United States) Hybrid R&D							10	9	34
32	(United States) Rich Grupp	(United States) Downing/Atlanta	8	13				12			32
33	(Denmark) Tom Kristensen	(Germany) BMW Motorsport	**1**^{L}								31
34	(Italy) Mauro Baldi	(United States) Doran Enterprises	24	2^{L}					11	12	31
35	(Portugal) Pedro Lamy	(United Kingdom) Price & Bscher				7	5				28
36	(Germany) Ralf Kelleners	(United States) Champion Racing			6			7	17	15	27
37	(United States) Mike Davies	(United States) Dollahite Racing	27	9	15	14	10				27
37	(United States) Bill Dollahite	(United States) Dollahite Racing	27	9	15	14	10				27
39	(United States) Kurt Baumann	(United States) Genesis Racing	12								27
39	(United States) Kurt Baumann	(United States) Nygmatech Motorsports						13	13		27
40	(France) Jean-Marc Gounon	(France) DAMS			13			16	19	3	26
40	(France) Christophe Tinseau	(France) DAMS			13			16	19	3	26
42	(United States) A.J. Smith	(United States) Downing/Atlanta	8		11						26
43	(Italy) Rinaldo Capello	(Germany) Audi Sport Team Joest	3								24
43	(Italy) Michele Alboreto	(Germany) Audi Sport Team Joest	3								24
45	(Switzerland) Fredy Lienhard	(United States) Doran Enterprises	24		8	9	19	8			23
46	(Belgium) Thierry Boutsen	(United States) Champion Racing	4	18							22
46	(Germany) Dirk Müller	(United States) Champion Racing	4								22
48	(United States) Chris Ronson	(United States) Downing/Atlanta	9			18	14				22
49	(United States) Henry Camferdam	(United States) Transatlantic Racing	10	8			17	11			21
50	(United States) Jack Baldwin	(United States) Robinson Racing	13	20		11	18	20			21
50	(United States) George Robinson	(United States) Robinson Racing	13	20		11	18	20			21
52	(Italy) Emmanuele Pirro	(Germany) Audi Sport Team Joest	5								20
52	(Germany) Frank Biela	(Germany) Audi Sport Team Joest	5								20
52	(United Kingdom) Perry McCarthy	(Germany) Audi Sport Team Joest	5								20
55	(United Kingdom) Andy Pilgrim	(United States) Champion Racing				12	8				20
56	(United States) Dave Dullum	(United States) Genesis Racing	12								20
56	(United States) Dave Dullum	(United States) Nygmatech Motorsports						13			20
57	(Belgium) Marc Duez	(United States) Hybrid R&D	7								18
58	(United States) Howard Katz	(United States) Downing/Atlanta		14				10			18
59	(United States) Paul Debban	(United States) Intersport Racing					16		12	11	17
60	(Canada) Scott Maxwell	(Canada) Multimatic Motorsports		15	9			DNS			16
61	(United States) Tim Hubman	(Germany) Konrad Motorsport	28								16
61	(United States) Tim Hubman	(United States) Whittington Bros.		10							16
61	(United States) Tim Hubman	(United States) Intersport Racing						14			16
62	(United States) John Mirro	(United States) Intersport Racing	15	16	DNP	DNQ		14			16
63	(Mexico) Memo Gidley	(United States) Panoz Motor Sports						5			15
64	(Czech Republic) Tomáš Enge	(Italy) Team Rafanelli SRL	18^{F}					6			15
65	(United States) Duncan Dayton	(United States) Transatlantic Racing	10								15
66	(United States) Dennis Spencer	(United States) Downing/Atlanta	8	13				12			15
67	(United States) Ryan Jones	(United States) Intersport Racing	11	17				17			14
67	(United Kingdom) Chris Goodwin	(United States) Intersport Racing	11								14
69	(United States) Tommy Kendall	(United States) Doran Enterprises	23	7							13
70	(United States) Rick Fairbanks	(United States) Genesis Racing	12	21							13
71	(United States) Irv Hoerr	(United States) Robinson Racing	13					20			12
72	(Germany) Klaus Graf	(United States) Panoz Motor Sports	WD								11
72	(Germany) Klaus Graf	(United States) J&P Motorsports						9			11
72	(Netherlands) Jan Lammers	(Germany) Konrad Motorsport	28								11
72	(Netherlands) Jan Lammers	(United States) J&P Motorsports						9			11
74	(United States) Jeret Schroeder	(United States) TRV Motorsport	26	14				21	15		11
75	(United States) Don Whittington	(United States) Whittington Bros.	21	10		WD	WD				10
75	(France) Franck Fréon	(Japan) Autoexe Motorsports	17								10
75	(France) Franck Fréon	(United States) Downing/Atlanta						10			10
77	(United States) Sam Brown	(United States) Intersport Racing	15	16	DNP	DNQ					10
77	(United States) Butch Brickell	(United States) Intersport Racing	15								10
79	(United States) Spencer Trenery	(United States) Intersport Racing	15						18	11	9
80	(United States) Barry Waddell	(United States) TRV Motorsport	26								8
80	(United States) Barry Waddell	(United States) Downing/Atlanta						12			8
81	(United States) Rob Dyson	(United States) Dyson Racing				13					7
81	(Sweden) Niclas Jönsson	(United States) Intersport Racing				19	13	17		13	7
83	(United States) Vic Rice	(United States) Team Cascadia	DNS								6
83	(United States) Vic Rice	(United States) Intersport Racing						14	18		6
83	(United States) Tom Volk	(United States) TRV Motorsport	26	14				21	15		6
85	(Finland) Harri Toivonen	(Canada) Multimatic Motorsports		15				DNS			5
85	(United States) Shane Lewis	(United States) Team Cascadia	DNS			DNQ	15				5
85	(United States) Ed Zabinski	(United States) Team Cascadia	DNS			DNQ	15				5
88	(France) Yannick Dalmas	(Germany) BMW Motorsport	19^{L}								1
88	(Italy) Pierluigi Martini	(Germany) BMW Motorsport	19^{L}								1
-	(Germany) Thomas Bscher	(United Kingdom) Price & Bscher	20			7*	5*				0
-	(Argentina) Juan Manuel Fangio II	(United States) Doyle-Risi Racing	6*								0
-	(United States) Ron Fellows	(United States) Dyson Racing					6*				0
-	(Sweden) Stanley Dickens	(United States) Doran Enterprises						8*			0
-	(United States) Steve Pelke	(United States) Downing/Atlanta	9*								0
-	(Canada) Ken Wilden	(Canada) Multimatic Motorsports			9*						0
-	(Austria) Franz Konrad	(Germany) Konrad Motorsport	28								0
-	(Austria) Franz Konrad	(United States) J&P Motorsports						9*			0
-	(United Kingdom) Richard Dean	(United Kingdom) Sintura Racing							9*		0
-	(United Kingdom) Kurt Luby	(United Kingdom) Sintura Racing							9*		0
-	(United States) Dave Cutler	(United States) Hybrid R&D								9*	0
-	(Canada) Martin Guimont	(United States) Intersport Racing			12*						0
-	(United States) Tony Kester	(United States) Nygmatech Motorsports						13			0
-	(United States) Stan Wattles	(United States) Nygmatech Motorsports							13*		0
-	(United States) Dorsey Schroeder	(United States) Dyson Racing	14								0
-	(New Zealand) Scott Dixon	(United States) Doran Enterprises						15			0
-	(United States) Anthony Lazzaro	(United States) Doyle-Risi Racing	29		16						0
-	(Denmark) John Nielsen	(United States) Panoz Motor Sports	16								0
-	(United States) Bruce Trenery	(United States) Intersport Racing					16				0
-	(France) Franck Montagny	(France) DAMS						16			0
-	(Japan) Yojiro Terada	(Japan) Autoexe Motorsports	17								0
-	(Belgium) David Saelens	(Italy) Team Rafanelli SRL	18								0
-	(France) Xavier Pompidou	(United States) Doyle-Risi Racing						18			0
-	(Italy) Andrea Montermini	(United States) Doyle-Risi Racing						19			0
-	(United States) Dale Whittington	(United States) Whittington Bros.	21			WD	WD				0
-	(United States) Hurley Haywood	(United States) Whittington Bros.	21								0
-	(United States) Jeff Altenburg	(United States) Genesis Racing		21							0
-	(United States) Lyn St. James	(United States) TRV Motorsport						21			0
-	(United States) Kris Wilson	(United States) Kopf Precision	22			DNQ					0
-	(United States) Tim Moser	(United States) Kopf Precision	22			DNQ					0
-	(United States) Mark Dismore	(United States) Doran Enterprises	23								0
-	(United States) Pete Halsmer	(United States) TRV Motorsport	26								0
-	(United States) Doc Bundy	(United States) Dollahite Racing	27								0
-	(United States) Steve Romak	(United States) Intersport Racing				DNQ					0
Pos.	Driver	Team	SEB (United States)	ATL (United States)	MOS (Canada)	SON (United States)	POR (United States)	PET (United States)	LAG (United States)	LVS (United States)	Pts.

=== LMP Manufacturers Championship ===
Manufacturers only scored the points for their highest finishing entry in each race.

Pos.	Team	SEB (United States)	ATL (United States)	MOS (Canada)	SON (United States)	POR (United States)	PET (United States)	LAG (United States)	LVS (United States)	Pts.
1	(United States) Panoz	16	5	1	2	1	1	2	4	149
2	(Germany) BMW	1		WD	1	2	2	1	1	147
3	(Italy) Ferrari	6	2	5	8	9	8	4	5	122
4	(Germany) Porsche	4	18	6	12	8	7	17	15	74
5	(Germany) Audi	3								24
Pos.	Team	SEB (United States)	ATL (United States)	MOS (Canada)	SON (United States)	POR (United States)	PET (United States)	LAG (United States)	LVS (United States)	Pts.

=== LMP Teams Championship ===
Teams only scored the points for their highest finishing entry in each race.

Pos.	Team	No.	SEB (United States)	ATL (United States)	MOS (Canada)	SON (United States)	POR (United States)	PET (United States)	LAG (United States)	LVS (United States)	Pts.
1	(United States) Panoz Motor Sports	1	25	5	2	2	1	**1**	**8**	**10**	149
1	(United States) Panoz Motor Sports	2	16	DNS	**1**	3	3	5	2	4	149
2	(Germany) BMW Motorsport	42	**1**		WD	**1**	**2**	3	1	1	147
2	(Germany) BMW Motorsport	43	19		WD	5	4	2	3	2	147
3	(United States) Dyson Racing	16	14	**19**	14	13	6		5	6	139
3	(United States) Dyson Racing	20	2	3	4	4	21	4		14	139
4	(United States) Doyle-Risi Racing	11	29	4	5	10	9	18	14	8	99
4	(United States) Doyle-Risi Racing	12	6	6	7	17	11	19	6	7	99
5	(United States) Doran Enterprises	27	24	2	8	9	19	8	11	12	97
5	(United States) Doran Enterprises	36	23	7	16	8	12	15	4	5	97
6	(Italy) Team Rafanelli SRL	0	18	1	3	6	7	6	16	16	85
7	(United States) Champion Racing	38	4	18	6	12	8	7	17	15	74
8	(United States) Hybrid R&D	15	7	11	10	15	20		10	9	63
9	(United States) Intersport Racing	28	11	17	12	19	13	17	12	13	52
9	(United States) Intersport Racing	29	15	16		DNQ	16	14	18	11	52
10	(United States) Downing/Atlanta	62	8	13				12			50
10	(United States) Downing/Atlanta	63	9	12	11	18	14	10			50
11	(United States) Transatlantic Racing	8	10	8		16	17	11	7		49
12	(United States) Dollahite Racing	18	27	9	15	14	10				32
13	(United Kingdom) Price & Bscher	26	20			7	5				28
14	(France) DAMS	75			13			16	19	3	26
15	(Germany) Audi Sport Team Joest	77	3								24
15	(Germany) Audi Sport Team Joest	78	5								24
16	(United States) Robinson Racing	74	13	20		11	18	20			21
17	(Canada) Multimatic Motorsports	06		15	9			DNS			16
18	(United States) Nygmatech Motorsports	31						13	13		14
19	(United States) Genesis Racing	31	12								13
19	(United States) Genesis Racing	32		21							13
20	(United States) J&P Motorsports	13						9			11
20	(United Kingdom) Sintura Racing	00							9		11
22	(United States) TRV Motorsport	95	26	14				21	15		11
23	(United States) Whittington Bros.	5	21	10							10
24	(United States) Team Cascadia	97	DNS			DNQ	15				5
-	(Japan) Autoexe Motorsports	44	17								0
-	(United States) Kopf Precision	60	22			DNQ					0
-	(Germany) Konrad Motorsport	66	28								0
Pos.	Team	No.	SEB (United States)	ATL (United States)	MOS (Canada)	SON (United States)	POR (United States)	PET (United States)	LAG (United States)	LVS (United States)	Pts.

=== GTS Drivers' Championship ===
Bold - Pole position. F - Fastest lap. L - led a lap. M - led the most laps. * - Not awarded points.

Pos.	Driver	Team	SEB (United States)	ATL (United States)	MOS (Canada)	SON (United States)	POR (United States)	PET (United States)	LAG (United States)	LVS (United States)	Pts.
1	(Monaco) Olivier Beretta	(France) Dodge Viper Team Oreca			1^{F}	**1**^{F}	**1**^{F}	**1**^{F}	**1**^{F}	**2**	151
2	(Austria) Karl Wendlinger	(France) Dodge Viper Team Oreca			**2**	3	2	**1**	**1**	1^{F}	137
3	(United States) Martin Snow	(United States) Martin Snow Racing	1	**2**	6	5	4	13	3	7	129
4	(United States) David Donohue	(France) Dodge Viper Team Oreca			1	**1**	**1**	2	9	**2**	117
5	(United States) Kelly Collins	(United States) Martin Snow Racing		**2**	6	5	4		3	7	116
5	(United States) Kelly Collins	(United States) Corvette Racing						4			116
6	(United States) Tommy Archer	(France) Dodge Viper Team Oreca			**2**	3	2	2	9	1	107
7	(United States) Terry Borcheller	(United States) Saleen/Allen Speedlab	11	4	3	4	6	9	7	6	105
7	(United States) Ron Johnson	(United States) Saleen/Allen Speedlab	11	4	3	4	6	9	7	6	105
9	(Canada) Ron Fellows	(United States) Corvette Racing	**4**			2		5	2	3	98
10	(Austria) Franz Konrad	(Germany) Konrad Motorsport		3^{F}		7	3		5	5	82
11	(Germany) Wolfgang Kaufmann	(Germany) Freisinger Motorsport	2			6	5	10	8		77
12	(United States) Chris Kneifel	(United States) Corvette Racing	**4**			2		5	2	3	76
13	(France) Michel Ligonnet	(Germany) Freisinger Motorsport	2			6	5	10			65
14	(United States) Andy Pilgrim	(United States) Corvette Racing	7^{F}					4			62
14	(United States) Andy Pilgrim	(United States) ARBJH Development		7	7						62
15	(United States) Zak Brown	(United States) ARBJH Development	8*	7	7*	8	7*	6	6	8*	53
16	(Italy) Stefano Buttiero	(United States) ARBJH Development				8	7		6	8	51
17	(United States) John Morton	(United States) CJ Motorsport	6	5	5						49
18	(United States) Charles Slater	(Germany) Konrad Motorsport	3					12		5	47
19	(Germany) André Ahrlé	(United States) Roock Motorsport						7	4	4	47
20	(France) Bob Wollek	(Germany) Freisinger Motorsport				7	3		8		44
21	(United States) Peter Kitchak	(Germany) Konrad Motorsport	3	3							43
22	(United States) John O'Steen	(United States) Schumacher Racing	10	1	4						42
22	(United States) John O'Steen	(United States) Martin Snow Racing						13			42
22	(United States) Larry Schumacher	(United States) Schumacher Racing	10	1	4						42
22	(United States) Larry Schumacher	(United States) Martin Snow Racing						13			42
24	(Netherlands) Patrick Huisman	(United States) Martin Snow Racing	1								30
25	(Canada) John Graham	(United States) CJ Motorsport	6	5	5						30
25	(Italy) Simon Sobrero	(Germany) Konrad Motorsport							5	5	30
27	(United States) Stephen Earle	(United States) ARBJH Development						6	6		28
28	(Belgium) Marc Duez	(France) Dodge Viper Team Oreca						**1**			25
29	(France) Jean-Philippe Belloc	(France) Dodge Viper Team Oreca						2			21
30	(Austria) Mandfred Jurasz	(Germany) Freisinger Motorsport	5								20
31	(Portugal) Ni Amorim	(France) Dodge Viper Team Oreca						3			19
31	(United Kingdom) Justin Bell	(France) Dodge Viper Team Oreca						3			19
31	(France) Emmanuel Clérico	(France) Dodge Viper Team Oreca						3			19
34	(United States) Davy Jones	(United States) CJ Motorsport	6								19
35	(United States) Scott Sharp	(United States) Corvette Racing	7					4			17
36	(United States) John Paul Jr.	(United States) Corvette Racing	**4***					5			15
37	(United States) Tim McGlynn	(United States) Johnson Autosport	9	6							14
37	(United States) Jack Lewis	(United States) Johnson Autosport		6							14
37	(United States) Joe Foster	(United States) ARBJH Development						6			14
37	(United States) Michael Schrom	(United States) ARBJH Development						6			14
41	(United States) Lance Stewart	(Germany) Freisinger Motorsport	2*					8			12
42	(United States) Shane Lewis	(United States) Saleen/Allen Speedlab						9			11
-	(United States) Melanie Snow	(United States) Martin Snow Racing	1*								0
-	(Netherlands) Mike Hezemans	(Germany) Konrad Motorsport	3*								0
-	(Germany) Claudia Hürtgen	(United States) ARBJH Development	8*					7*	4*	4*	0
-	(Germany) Michael Irmgratz	(Germany) Freisinger Motorsport	5*								0
-	(United States Virgin Islands) Brad Creger	(Germany) Freisinger Motorsport	5*								0
-	(United States) John Heinricy	(United States) Corvette Racing	7*								0
-	(Germany) Hubert Haupt	(United States) ARBJH Development	8*					7*			0
-	(Japan) Yukihiro Hane	(Germany) Freisinger Motorsport						8*			0
-	(United States) Robert Johnson	(United States) Johnson Autosport	9*								0
-	(United States) Mike Hoke	(United States) Johnson Autosport	9*								0
-	(United States) Robert Nearn	(United States) Schumacher Racing	10*								0
-	(United States) Steve Saleen	(United States) Saleen/Allen Speedlab	11*								0
-	(United States) Darren Law	(United States) Saleen/Allen Speedlab	11*								0
-	(Belgium) Didier Defourny	(United Kingdom) Chamberlain Motorsport						11*			0
-	(Netherlands) Hans Hugenholtz	(United Kingdom) Chamberlain Motorsport						11*			0
-	(Japan) Seiji Ara	(United Kingdom) Chamberlain Motorsport						11*			0
-	(United States) Arthur Pilla	(United States) DM Motorsports	12*								0
-	(United States) Bob Mazzuoccola	(United States) DM Motorsports	12*								0
-	(United States) David Kicak	(United States) DM Motorsports	12*								0
-	(United States) Mark Montgomery	(United States) DM Motorsports	12*								0
-	(Belgium) Michel Neugarten	(Germany) Konrad Motorsport						12*			0
-	(United States) Tom McGlynn	(Germany) Konrad Motorsport						12*			0
-	(United States) Harry Rady	(United States) Maxwell Racing							DNS		0
-	(United States) Cary Eisenlohr	(United States) Maxwell Racing							DNS		0
Pos.	Driver	Team	SEB (United States)	ATL (United States)	MOS (Canada)	SON (United States)	POR (United States)	PET (United States)	LAG (United States)	LVS (United States)	Pts.

=== GTS Manufacturers Championship ===
Manufacturers only scored the points for their highest finishing entry in each race.

Pos.	Team	SEB (United States)	ATL (United States)	MOS (Canada)	SON (United States)	POR (United States)	PET (United States)	LAG (United States)	LVS (United States)	Pts.
1	(Germany) Porsche	1	1	4	5	3	6	3	4	156
2	(United States) DaimlerChrysler			1	1	1	1	1	1	150
3	(United States) Saleen	11	4	3	4	6	9	7	6	119
Pos.	Team	SEB (United States)	ATL (United States)	MOS (Canada)	SON (United States)	POR (United States)	PET (United States)	LAG (United States)	LVS (United States)	Pts.

=== GTS Teams Championship ===
Teams only scored the points for their highest finishing entry in each race.

Pos.	Team	No.	SEB (United States)	ATL (United States)	MOS (Canada)	SON (United States)	POR (United States)	PET (United States)	LAG (United States)	LVS (United States)	Pts.
1	(France) Dodge Viper Team Oreca	91			1	**1**	**1**	**1**	**1**	**2**	150
1	(France) Dodge Viper Team Oreca	92			**2**	3	2	2	9	1	150
1	(France) Dodge Viper Team Oreca	93						3			150
2	(United States) Martin Snow Racing	56	1	**2**	6	5	4	13	3	7	136
3	(United States) Saleen/Allen Speedlab	55	11	4	3	4	6	9	7	6	119
4	(Germany) Konrad Motorsport	61	3	3		7	3	12	5	5	113
5	(United States) ARBJH Development	83	8	7	7	8	7	6	6	8	108
6	(United States) Corvette Racing	3	**4**			2		5	2	3	100
6	(United States) Corvette Racing	4	7					4			100
7	(Germany) Freisinger Motorsport	48	2			6	5	10	8		79
7	(Germany) Freisinger Motorsport	49	5					8			79
8	(United States) Schumacher Racing	99	10	1	4						57
9	(United States) CJ Motorsport	04	6	5	5						49
10	(United States) Roock Motorsport N. A.	08						7	4	4	47
11	(United States) Johnson Autosport	50	9	6							30
12	(United States) DM Motorsports	71	12								13
13	(United Kingdom) Chamberlain Motorsport	19						11			9
-	(United States) Maxwell Racing	52							DNS		0
Pos.	Team	No.	SEB (United States)	ATL (United States)	MOS (Canada)	SON (United States)	POR (United States)	PET (United States)	LAG (United States)	LVS (United States)	Pts.

=== GT Standings ===
==== GT Drivers' Championship ====
Bold - Pole position. F - Fastest lap. L - led a lap. M - led the most laps. * - Not awarded points.

Pos.	Driver	Team	SEB (United States)	ATL (United States)	MOS (Canada)	SON (United States)	POR (United States)	PET (United States)	LAG (United States)	LVS (United States)	Pts.
1	(United States) Cort Wagner	(United States) Alex Job Racing	1	**2**	1	**2**	**DSQ**	**1**	**2**	**1**	168
2	(United States) Brian Cunningham	(United States) Prototype Technology Group	9	1	3	12	1	3	7	2	146
3	(United States) Johannes van Overbeek	(United States) Prototype Technology Group	9	1	3	3	2	4	10	4	144
4	(Germany) Dirk Müller	(United States) Alex Job Racing		**2**	1	**2^{F}**	**DSQ**	**1^{F}**	**2**	**1^{F}**	141
5	(United States) Darryl Havens	(United States) Alex Job Racing	1	7	6	4	6	14	3	6	121
6	(United States) Mike Fitzgerald	(United States) Alex Job Racing	**2**	7	6	4	6	14	3	6	117
7	(Germany) Hans-Joachim Stuck	(United States) Prototype Technology Group	11	4	**2**	1	12	2	7	4	114
8	(United States) Mark Simo	(United States) Prototype Technology Group	9	3	9	12	5	4	12	5	109
9	(United States) Randy Pobst	(United States) Alex Job Racing	**2^{F}**			5	8	14			101
9	(United States) Randy Pobst	(United States) Aspen Knolls Racing		5							101
9	(United States) Randy Pobst	(United States) Pregrid Motorsports							13		101
9	(United States) Randy Pobst	(United States) Contemporary Motorsports								3	101
10	(United States) Joel Reiser	(United States) Reiser Callas Rennsport	7		5	8	9	6	4	11	96
10	(United States) Grady Willingham	(United States) Reiser Callas Rennsport	7	15*	5	8	9	6	4	11	96
12	(United States) Peter Cunningham	(United States) Prototype Technology Group	11	3	9	DNS	5	3	10	2	95
13	(United States) Craig Stanton	(United States) Reiser Callas Rennsport	7	8	7	8	9	6	4	11	94
14	(United States) Boris Said	(United States) Prototype Technology Group	11	4		1	12	2	7	5	92
15	(United States) David Murry	(United States) Reiser Callas Rennsport	12	8^{F}		6	4	13	1	13	89
16	(United States) Mike Conte	(United States) Contemporary Motorsports	3		10*	13		5	9	3	76
17	(Belgium) Bruno Lambert	(United States) Contemporary Motorsports	3			13	3	5	9		76
18	(United States) Darren Law	(United States) G & W Motorsports	5	DNS							67
18	(United States) Darren Law	(United States) Toad Hall Motor Racing		10							67
18	(United States) Darren Law	(United States) Prototype Technology Group				3	2	4			67
19	(United Kingdom) Johnny Mowlem	(United States) Reiser Callas Rennsport	12		7			13	1^{F}	13	52
20	(Germany) Christian Menzel	(United States) Prototype Technology Group			**2^{F}**	15	1				47
21	(United States) Joe Varde	(United States) Vanderhoof Racing	16	6		11					42
21	(United States) Joe Varde	(United States) Contemporary Motorsports					3				42
22	(Italy) Luca Riccitelli	(Germany) RWS Motorsport	DNS			9	11	8		10	42
23	(United States) Scott Peeler	(United States) Team PRC			4				5		40
23	(United States) Scott Peeler	(United States) Team ARE								12	40
24	(Austria) Hans-Jörg Hofer	(Germany) RWS Motorsport	DNS			9	11	8	11	10	40
25	(Germany) Sascha Maassen	(United States) Alex Job Racing						**1**			34
25	(Germany) Sascha Maassen	(Germany) RWS Motorsport							11		34
26	(United States) Danny Marshall	(United States) G & W Motorsports	5	DNS				7			33
26	(United States) Steve Marshall	(United States) G & W Motorsports	5	DNS				7			33
28	(United States) Kevin Buckler	(United States) The Racer's Group				7	13		14		32
28	(United States) Kevin Buckler	(Germany) Freisinger Motorsport								7	32
29	(United States) Doc Bundy	(United States) Reiser Callas Rennsport				6	4				31
30	(United States) Kelly Collins	(United States) Alex Job Racing	1								30
31	(United States) Geoff Auberlen	(United States) Team PRC			4						27
31	(United States) Geoff Auberlen	(United States) Team ARE						10			27
32	(United States) Vic Rice	(United States) The Racer's Group				7	7				26
33	(United States) Carlos DeQuesada	(United States) Alegra Motorsports	8					12			25
33	(United States) Scooter Gabel	(United States) Alegra Motorsports	8					12			25
35	(United States) Mike Doolin	(United States) Team PRC							5		23
35	(United States) Mike Doolin	(United States) Team ARE								12	23
36	(United States) Tim Ralston	(United States) Vanderhoof Racing		6		11					23
37	(United States) David Friedman	(United States) Millennium Motorsports		9					8		23
37	(United States) Chris Miller	(United States) Millennium Motorsports		9					8		23
39	(United States) Spencer Trenery	(United States) The Racer's Group				10	7				23
40	(Germany) Ulli Richter	(Germany) Gallade	4								22
41	(United States) Peter Argetsinger	(United States) Team ARE	17	11	8						21
41	(United States) Richard Polidori	(United States) Team ARE	17	11	8						21
43	(Canada) Sylvain Tremblay	(United States) G & W Motorsports	5								20
44	(United States) Brian Simo	(United States) Prototype Technology Group						3			19
45	(United States) Stu Hayner	(United States) Bell Motorsports	6								19
46	(United States) Kevin Wheeler	(United States) Auto Sport South Racing	15	12				11			17
47	(Italy) Simon Sobrero	(United States) Team ARE				14		10			16
48	(United States) Jim Kelly	(United States) Alex Job Racing				5					15
48	(United States) Shane Lewis	(United States) Aspen Knolls Racing		5							15
50	(United States) Shareef Malnik	(United States) Team Transenergy	10								15
51	(United Kingdom) Chris Hall	(United States) G & W Motorsports						7			13
51	(United States) Philip Collin	(Germany) Freisinger Motorsport								7	13
53	(Netherlands) Patrick Huisman	(Germany) RWS Motorsport						8			12
53	(United States) Kimberly Hiskey	(United States) The Racer's Group					13		15		12
53	(United States) Kimberly Hiskey	(United States) Fordahl Motorsports								8	12
55	(United States) Don Kitch	(United States) Alex Job Racing					8				12
56	(United States) Leo Hindery	(United States) Bell Motorsports	13								12
57	(United States) John Heinricy	(Germany) Freisinger Motorsport						9			11
57	(United States) Dave White	(Germany) Freisinger Motorsport						9			11
57	(United States) Charles Coker	(Germany) Freisinger Motorsport						9			11
60	(United States) Erik Johnson	(United States) Toad Hall Motor Racing		10							10
60	(United States) Michael Schrom	(United States) The Racer's Group				10					10
60	(Italy) Angelo Cilli	(United States) Team ARE						10			10
63	(United States) John Brosius	(United States) Pregrid Motorsports					10		13		10
63	(United States) Jonathan Fay	(United States) Pregrid Motorsports					10		13		10
65	(United States) Brady Refenning	(United States) Auto Sport South Racing	15	12				11			8
66	(United States) Bill Rollwitz	(United States) Team Transenergy	10	13							7
66	(United States) Sam Shalala	(United States) Team Transenergy	10	13							7
68	(United States) Spencer Pumpelly	(United States) Team Pumpelly Racing		14				15			6
68	(United States) Paulo Lima	(United States) Team Pumpelly Racing		14							6
68	(United States) Paulo Lima	(United States) Auto Sport South Racing						11			6
-	(United States) David MacNeil	(United States) Alex Job Racing	**2***								0
-	(Germany) Ulrich Gallade	(Germany) Gallade	4*								0
-	(Germany) Karl-Heinz Wlazik	(Germany) Gallade	4*								0
-	(United States) Dale White	(United States) White Lightning Racing							6*	9*	0
-	(United States) Tony Kester	(United States) Bell Motorsports	6*								0
-	(United States) Scott Neuman	(United States) Bell Motorsports	6*								0
-	(United States) Matt Drendel	(United States) Bell Motorsports	6*								0
-	(United States) Michael Petersen	(United States) White Lightning Racing							6*		0
-	(United States) Cindi Lux	(United States) G & W Motorsports						7*			0
-	(United States) Ugo Colombo	(United States) Alegra Motorsports	8*								0
-	(United States) John Hill	(United States) The Racer's Group							15*		0
-	(United States) John Hill	(United States) Fordahl Motorsports								8*	0
-	(United States) Steve Valentinetti	(United States) Fordahl Motorsports								8*	0
-	(United States) Wade Gaughran	(United States) The Racer's Group							14*		0
-	(United States) Wade Gaughran	(United States) White Lightning Racing								9*	0
-	(United States) Andre Toennis	(United States) Team Transenergy	10*								0
-	(United States) James Oppenheimer	(United States) Toad Hall Motor Racing		10*							0
-	(United Kingdom) Nick Holt	(United States) Contemporary Motorsports			10*						0
-	(United States) Allan Ziegelman	(United States) Broadfoot Racing	14*								0
-	(United States) Allan Ziegelman	(United States) Auto Sport South Racing						11*			0
-	(United States) Peter Baron	(United States) Bell Motorsports	13*								0
-	(United States) James McCormick	(United States) Bell Motorsports	13*								0
-	(United States) Gian Luigi Buitoni	(United States) Bell Motorsports	13*								0
-	(United States) Kim Wolfkill	(United States) The Racer's Group					13*				0
-	(United States) Hurley Haywood	(United States) Reiser Callas Rennsport						13*			0
-	(United States) Stephen Earle	(United States) Broadfoot Racing	14*								0
-	(United States) Todd Snyder	(United States) Broadfoot Racing	14*								0
-	(United States) Chris Mitchum	(United States) Broadfoot Racing	14*								0
-	(United States) Allan Ziegelman	(United States) Team Pumpelly Racing		14*							0
-	(United States) Harry Rady	(United States) Team ARE				14*					0
-	(United States) Jack Refenning	(United States) Auto Sport South Racing	15*								0
-	(United States) Jake Vargo	(United States) Auto Sport South Racing	15*								0
-	(France) Michel Ligonnet	(United States) Reiser Callas Rennsport		15*							0
-	(United States) Jack Lewis	(United States) Team Pumpelly Racing						15*			0
-	(United States) Kurt Mathewson	(United States) Team Pumpelly Racing						15*			0
-	(United States) Tim Ralston	(United States) Vanderhoof Racing	16*								0
-	(United States) Blaise Alexander	(United States) Vanderhoof Racing	16*								0
-	(Germany) Günther Blieninger	(Germany) RWS Motorsport	DNS								0
-	(Germany) Kirsten Jodexnis	(Germany) RWS Motorsport	DNS								0
Pos.	Driver	Team	SEB (United States)	ATL (United States)	MOS (Canada)	SON (United States)	POR (United States)	PET (United States)	LAG (United States)	LVS (United States)	Pts.

==== GT Manufacturers' Championship ====
Manufacturers only scored the points for their highest finishing entry in each race.

Pos.	Team	SEB (United States)	ATL (United States)	MOS (Canada)	SON (United States)	POR (United States)	PET (United States)	LAG (United States)	LVS (United States)	Pts.
1	(Germany) Porsche	1	2	1	2	3	1	1	1	191
2	(Germany) BMW	6	1	2	1	1	2	7	2	170
Pos.	Team	SEB (United States)	ATL (United States)	MOS (Canada)	SON (United States)	POR (United States)	PET (United States)	LAG (United States)	LVS (United States)	Pts.

==== GT Teams' Championship ====
Teams only scored the points for their highest finishing entry in each race.

Pos.	Team	No.	SEB (United States)	ATL (United States)	MOS (Canada)	SON (United States)	POR (United States)	PET (United States)	LAG (United States)	LVS (United States)	Pts.
1	(United States) Prototype Technology Group	6		3	9	12	5	2	7	4	161
1	(United States) Prototype Technology Group	7	9	1	3	15	1	3	12	2	161
1	(United States) Prototype Technology Group	10	11	4	**2**	3	2	4	10	5	161
2	(United States) Alex Job Racing	22	**2**	7	6	4	6	14	3	6	146
2	(United States) Alex Job Racing	23	1	**2**	1						146
2	(United States) Alex Job Racing	24				5	8				146
3	(United States) Reiser Callas Rennsport	02	12	8	7	6	4	13	1	13	124
3	(United States) Reiser Callas Rennsport	03	7	15	5	8	9	6	4	11	124
4	(United States) Contemporary Motorsports	17	3		10	13	3	5	9	3	105
5	(Germany) Manthey Racing	23				**2**	**DSQ**	**1**	**2**	**1**	92
6	(Germany) RWS Motorsport	25	DNS			9	11	8	11	10	51
7	(United States) Team ARE	76	17	11	8	14		10		12	45
8	(United States) Prototype Technology Group	9				1	12				33
9	(United States) G & W Motorsports	07	5	DNS				7			33
10	(United States) Team PRC	40			4				5		32
11	(United States) The Racer's Group	67				10	13		15		32
11	(United States) The Racer's Group	68				7	7		14		32
12	(United States) Auto Sport South Racing	73	15	12				11			27
13	(United States) Alegra Motorsports	70	8					12			25
14	(Germany) Freisinger Motorsport	*						9		7	24
15	(United States) Vanderhoof Racing	88	16	6		11					23
16	(United States) Millennium Motorsports	90		9					8		23
17	(Germany) Gallade	33	4								22
18	(United States) Team Transenergy	46	10	13							22
19	(United States) Bell Motorsports	54	6								19
19	(United States) Bell Motorsports	72	13								19
20	(United States) Pregrid Motorsports	65					10		13		17
21	(United States) Aspen Knolls Racing	51		5							15
22	(United States) Fordahl Motorsports	81								8	12
23	(United States) White Lightning Racing	53							6	9	11
24	(United States) Broadfoot Racing	39	14								11
24	(United States) Team Pumpelly Racing	64		14				15			11
26	(United States) Toad Hall Motor Racing	39		10							10
Pos.	Team	No.	SEB (United States)	ATL (United States)	MOS (Canada)	SON (United States)	POR (United States)	PET (United States)	LAG (United States)	LVS (United States)	Pts.

== Bibliography ==
- Jones, Bruce (1999). American Le Mans Series Yearbook 1999. Haymarket Specialist Publications. ISBN 978-0860249665.
