= Jeff Altenburg =

American racing driver

- Nationality: (United States) American
- Born: December 10, 1962 (age 63) Ellicott City, Maryland, U.S.
- Current team: Momentum Race Group
- Categorisation: FIA Silver (until 2016); FIA Bronze (2017–)
- Former teams: Genesis Racing; TriPoint Motorsports; Powell Motorsport; Rocketsport Racing; The Rolex Rotors;
- Championships: 2007 Mazda Touring Car Championship

Awards
- 2000 BF Goodrich TransAM Series Rookie of the Year; 2007 SPEED World Challenge Touring Car Championship;

Jeff Altenburg (born December 10, 1962) is an American professional race car driver born in the United States. He has won sixteen national championships in both amateur and professional racing.

== Personal life ==
Altenburg attended Catonsville High School in Baltimore County, Maryland and later attended the US Navy's Nuclear Power School. He was married to Brenda Altenburg and has a daughter named Cloe.

== Racing career ==
Altenburg has competed in the BF Goodrich Trans Am Series, the Neon Challenge Series, the American Le Mans Series and the GrandAm Series. He has collected more than 120 career wins and 16 championships, with a record-setting six consecutive wins in the PPG Neon Challenge championships.

=== Genesis Racing ===
In 1999 and 2000, Altenburg raced with Genesis in four events in their Hawk MD3R and BMW M3

=== Tri-Point Motorsports ===
From 2002 until 2008, Altenburg competed in the SCCA Speed World Challenge Series racing as a Mazda Factory Driver for Tri Point Motorsports, first in their Mazda Protege Touring Cars and then in their Mazda 6 Touring Cars. In 2006, Altenburg earned six top-five finishes and three podiums and finished seventh in the Drivers' Championship. In 2007 Altenburg and car chief Ron Carroll won the 2007 SPEED World Challenge Championship, by first winning at Sebring and Miller Motorsports Park.

=== Powell Motorsport ===
In 2003, Altenburg joined Powell Motorsport two races into the 2003 11-race Grand AM Cup to finish the season in their #02 Rockland Standard Gear Corvette.

=== Rocketsport Racing ===
In 2000 the racing technologies firm, Steele Racing Enterprises, Inc., headed by Robert Steele, partnered with the race team Rocketsport Racing, headed by Paul Gentilozzi, to field Altenburg as a contender for the BF Goodrich Trans Am Series and Rookie of the year. Placing third in the driver's championship with four podiums including a third-place finish at his very first Trans Am Start in Sebring, Florida, Altenburg was awarded Rookie of the Year for the 2000 BF Goodrich Trans Am Series.

=== The Rolex Rotors ===
The Rolex Rotors were a Go-Kart team with whom Altenburg raced with in May 2001 during the 'Three Hours of Go-Karting,' an event held as a precursor to the Six Hours of The Glen being held at Waktins Glen International. Sadly, his team did not podium.

=== Momentum Race Group ===
Altenburg joined Momentum Race Group in 2009 In 2010, Altenburg drove for Momentum Race Group in their Number 05, Camaro SS, competing in the Grand Am Continental Tire Sportscar Championship in the GS.R class.

=== Championship Titles ===
- Between 1989 and 1997, 4 Solo Championships
- Between 1989 and 1997, 6 Pro Solo Championships
- 1997 Solo Championship
- 1997 SCCA Runoffs Champion
- 1997 Neon Challenge Championships (becoming the first driver to win the Solo, Runoffs and SCCA Pro Racing National Championships (Neon Challenge) in the same year)
- 1998 Neon Challenge Championships
- 1999 SCCA Runoffs Champion
- 2007 SPEED World Challenge Touring Car Championship

=== Notable Achievements ===
- Six Neon Challenge race wins.
- Ran the full 2000 Trans-Am Season with two seconds and two third podium finishes, finishing third in driver points.
- 2001 Second place finish in the Le Mans Series at Portland, driving a Viper GTSR.
- 2001 First place in the Grand Am Cup at Mosport, Sport Touring Class
- 2002 Second, Third, and Fifth place finishes in the SPEED World Challenge Touring Season at VIR, Road Atlanta and Trois Rivieres, respectively, finishing thirteenth in the season for driver points.
- 2003 sixth-place finish in the SPEED touring Car Drivers' Championship
- 2003 first place in the SPEED Touring Car at Mazda Raceway Laguna-Seca
- 2003 second-place finishes in the SPEED Touring Car Championships, at Infineon Raceway and twice at Road Atlanta
- 2004 first-place finish (career second) in the SPEED Touring Car at Laguna Seca
- 2007 first place in the SPEED Touring Car Championship at Sebring and Miller Motorsports Park
- Reset the qualifying lap record at Mid-Ohio in 2007
- 2012 shared first place in the Motul CTMP Grand Prix Pirelli World Challenge Touring Car twin sprints at Canadian Tire Motorsport Park in No. 43

=== Cars ===
- 1999 No. 12 Hawk MD3R with Genesis Racingref name=racingsportscars.com-jeffaltenburg />
- 1999 No. 32 Hawk MD3R with Genesis Racing
- 2000 No. 82 Dodge Viper with Michael McCann
- 2000 No. 55 BMW M3 with Genesis Racing
- 2001 No. 17 Chevret Corvette C5 with Trinkler Racing, LLC
- 2001 No. 45 Dodge Viper with American Viperacing
- 2001 No. 15 Porsche 996 GT3-RS with Fordahl Motorsports/Crazy Redhead Racing
- 2001 No. 56 Chrysler Viper with Muzzy Racing
- 2001 No. 35 Chevrolet Corvette with Phoenix American Motorsports
- 2002 No. 44 Dodge Viper with American Viperacing
- 2003 No. 71 Dodge Viper with Carsport America
- 2003 No. 02 Chevrolet Corvette with Powell Motorsport
- 2003 No. 17 Dodge Viper with Carsport America
- 2003 No. 123 Porsche 996 GT3 Cup with TPC Racing
- 2006 No. 70 Mazda RX-8 with SpeedSource
- 2006 No. 21 BMW M3 E46 with Matt Connolly Motorsports
- 2006 No. 142 Acura RSX-S with [DavisAcura.com]
- 2007 No. 13 Dodge Viper for Woodhouse Performance
- 2008 No. 21 Pontiac GTO.R with Matt Connolly Motorsports
- 2012 No. 43 HPA/RennGruppe/Brimtek/SGRacing Volkswagen GLI

== Motorsports career results ==
=== SCCA National Championship Runoffs ===
Year	Track	Car	Engine	Class	Finish	Start	Status
1994	Mid-Ohio	Dodge Neon	Dodge	Showroom Stock C	8	12	Running
1995	Mid-Ohio	Mazda Miata	Mazda	Showroom Stock B	15	2	Running
1996	Mid-Ohio	Mazda Miata	Mazda	Showroom Stock B	2	3	Running
1997	Mid-Ohio	BMW 328	BMW	Showroom Stock A	1	1	Running
1997	Mid-Ohio	Dodge Neon	Dodge	Showroom Stock C	35	9	Retired
1998	Mid-Ohio	Dodge Viper	Dodge	Touring 1	5	2	Retired
1998	Mid-Ohio	Dodge Neon	Dodge	Showroom Stock C	6	9	Running
1999	Mid-Ohio	Chevrolet Corvette	Chevrolet	Touring 1	1	1	Running
2000	Mid-Ohio	Chevrolet Corvette	Chevrolet	Touring 1	2	2	Running

=== American open-wheel racing results ===
(key)

==== Barber Dodge Pro Series ====
Barber Dodge Pro Series results
Year	1	2	3	4	5	6	7	8	9	10	11	12	Rank	Points
1998	SEB	LRP	DET	WGI	CLE	GRA	MOH; 14	ROA; 23	LS1; 15	ATL	HMS	LS2	37	3
