= 1999 Grand Prix of Atlanta =

Track map of Road Atlanta

The 1999 Grand Prix of Atlanta was the second round of the 1999 American Le Mans Series season. It took place at Road Atlanta, Georgia, on April 18, 1999.

== Race results ==
Class winners in bold.

Pos	Class	No	Team	Drivers	Chassis	Tyre	Laps
Pos	Class	No	Team	Drivers	Engine	Tyre	Laps
1	**LMP**	**0**	**(Italy) Team Rafanelli SRL**	**(Belgium) Eric van de Poele (Italy) Mimmo Schiattarella**	**Riley & Scott Mk III**	**Y**	**120**
1	**LMP**	**0**	**(Italy) Team Rafanelli SRL**	**(Belgium) Eric van de Poele (Italy) Mimmo Schiattarella**	**Judd GV4 4.0 L V10**	**Y**	**120**
2	LMP	27	(United States) Doran Enterprises	(Belgium) Didier Theys (Italy) Mauro Baldi	Ferrari 333 SP	**MI**	120
2	LMP	27	(United States) Doran Enterprises	(Belgium) Didier Theys (Italy) Mauro Baldi	Ferrari F310E 4.0 L V12	**MI**	120
3	LMP	20	(United States) Dyson Racing	(United States) Butch Leitzinger (United States) Elliott Forbes-Robinson	Riley & Scott Mk III	**G**	120
3	LMP	20	(United States) Dyson Racing	(United States) Butch Leitzinger (United States) Elliott Forbes-Robinson	Ford 5.0 L V8	**G**	120
4	LMP	11	(United States) Doyle-Risi Racing	(Italy) Max Angelelli (Belgium) Didier de Radiguès	Ferrari 333 SP	**P**	119
4	LMP	11	(United States) Doyle-Risi Racing	(Italy) Max Angelelli (Belgium) Didier de Radiguès	Ferrari F310E 4.0 L V12	**P**	119
5	LMP	1	(United States) Panoz Motor Sports	(Australia) David Brabham (France) Éric Bernard	Panoz LMP-1 Roadster-S	**MI**	119
5	LMP	1	(United States) Panoz Motor Sports	(Australia) David Brabham (France) Éric Bernard	Ford (Élan-Yates) 6.0 L V8	**MI**	119
6	LMP	12	(United States) Doyle-Risi Racing	(Italy) Alex Caffi (South Africa) Wayne Taylor	Ferrari 333 SP	**P**	118
6	LMP	12	(United States) Doyle-Risi Racing	(Italy) Alex Caffi (South Africa) Wayne Taylor	Ferrari F310E 4.0 L V12	**P**	118
7	LMP	36	(United States) Doran Enterprises (United States) Jim Matthews Racing	(United States) Tommy Kendall (United States) Jim Matthews	Ferrari 333 SP	**MI**	117
7	LMP	36	(United States) Doran Enterprises (United States) Jim Matthews Racing	(United States) Tommy Kendall (United States) Jim Matthews	Ferrari F310E 4.0 L V12	**MI**	117
8	LMP	8	(United States) Transatlantic Racing	(United States) Scott Schubot (United States) Henry Camferdam	Riley & Scott Mk III	**G**	116
8	LMP	8	(United States) Transatlantic Racing	(United States) Scott Schubot (United States) Henry Camferdam	Ford 5.0 L V8	**G**	116
9	LMP	18	(United States) Dollahite Racing	(United States) Bill Dollahite (United States) Mike Davies	Ferrari 333 SP	**P**	115
9	LMP	18	(United States) Dollahite Racing	(United States) Bill Dollahite (United States) Mike Davies	Ferrari F310E 4.0 L V12	**P**	115
10	LMP	5	(United States) Whittington Bros.	(United States) Don Whittington (United States) Tim Hubman	Lola B98/10	**G**	114
10	LMP	5	(United States) Whittington Bros.	(United States) Don Whittington (United States) Tim Hubman	Ford (Roush) 6.0 L V8	**G**	114
11	LMP	15	(United States) Hybrid R&D	(United States) Chris Bingham (Canada) Ross Bentley	Riley & Scott Mk III	**Y**	113
11	LMP	15	(United States) Hybrid R&D	(United States) Chris Bingham (Canada) Ross Bentley	Ford 5.0 L V8	**Y**	113
12	**GTS**	**99**	**(United States) Schumacher Racing**	**(United States) Larry Schumacher (United States) John O'Steen**	**Porsche 911 GT2**	?	**110**
12	**GTS**	**99**	**(United States) Schumacher Racing**	**(United States) Larry Schumacher (United States) John O'Steen**	**Porsche 3.6 L Turbo Flat-6**	?	**110**
13	GTS	56	(United States) Martin Snow Racing	(United States) Martin Snow (United States) Kelly Collins	Porsche 911 GT2	**MI**	110
13	GTS	56	(United States) Martin Snow Racing	(United States) Martin Snow (United States) Kelly Collins	Porsche 3.6 L Turbo Flat-6	**MI**	110
14	LMP	63	(United States) Downing Atlanta	(United States) Jim Downing (United States) Howard Katz	Kudzu DLY	**G**	108
14	LMP	63	(United States) Downing Atlanta	(United States) Jim Downing (United States) Howard Katz	Mazda R26B 2.6 L 4-Rotor	**G**	108
15	GTS	61	(Germany) Konrad Motorsport	(Austria) Franz Konrad (United States) Peter Kitchak	Porsche 911 GT2	**D**	107
15	GTS	61	(Germany) Konrad Motorsport	(Austria) Franz Konrad (United States) Peter Kitchak	Porsche 3.6 L Turbo Flat-6	**D**	107
16	**GT**	**7**	**(United States) Prototype Technology Group**	**(United States) Brian Cunningham (United States) Johannes van Overbeek**	**BMW M3**	**Y**	**107**
16	**GT**	**7**	**(United States) Prototype Technology Group**	**(United States) Brian Cunningham (United States) Johannes van Overbeek**	**BMW 3.2 L I6**	**Y**	**107**
17	GT	23	(United States) Alex Job Racing	(United States) Cort Wagner (Germany) Dirk Müller	Porsche 911 Carrera RSR	**Y**	107
17	GT	23	(United States) Alex Job Racing	(United States) Cort Wagner (Germany) Dirk Müller	Porsche 3.8 L Flat-6	**Y**	107
18	GT	6	(United States) Prototype Technology Group	(United States) Peter Cunningham (United States) Mark Simo	BMW M3	**Y**	107
18	GT	6	(United States) Prototype Technology Group	(United States) Peter Cunningham (United States) Mark Simo	BMW 3.2 L I6	**Y**	107
19	GT	10	(United States) Prototype Technology Group	(United States) Boris Said (Germany) Hans-Joachim Stuck	BMW M3	**Y**	107
19	GT	10	(United States) Prototype Technology Group	(United States) Boris Said (Germany) Hans-Joachim Stuck	BMW 3.2 L I6	**Y**	107
20	GT	51	(United States) Aspen Knolls Racing	(United States) Randy Pobst (United States) Shane Lewis	BMW M3	**Y**	106
20	GT	51	(United States) Aspen Knolls Racing	(United States) Randy Pobst (United States) Shane Lewis	BMW 3.2 L I6	**Y**	106
21	GTS	55	(United States) Saleen/Allen Speedlab	(United States) Terry Borcheller (United States) Ron Johnson	Saleen Mustang SR	**P**	106
21	GTS	55	(United States) Saleen/Allen Speedlab	(United States) Terry Borcheller (United States) Ron Johnson	Ford 8.0 L V8	**P**	106
22	LMP	62	(United States) Downing Atlanta	(United States) Dennis Spencer (United States) Rich Grupp	Kudzu DLM	**G**	105
22	LMP	62	(United States) Downing Atlanta	(United States) Dennis Spencer (United States) Rich Grupp	Mazda 2.0 L 3-Rotor	**G**	105
23	GTS	04	(United States) CJ Motorsport	(Canada) John Graham (United States) John Morton	Porsche 911 GT2	?	105
23	GTS	04	(United States) CJ Motorsport	(Canada) John Graham (United States) John Morton	Porsche 3.6 L Turbo Flat-6	?	105
24	LMP	95	(United States) TRV Motorsport	(United States) Jeret Schroeder (United States) Tom Volk	Riley & Scott Mk III	?	105
24	LMP	95	(United States) TRV Motorsport	(United States) Jeret Schroeder (United States) Tom Volk	Chevrolet 6.0 L V8	?	105
25	GT	88	(United States) Vanderhoof Racing	(United States) Joe Varde (United States) Tim Ralston	Porsche 911 Carrera RSR	?	105
25	GT	88	(United States) Vanderhoof Racing	(United States) Joe Varde (United States) Tim Ralston	Porsche 3.8 L Flat-6	?	105
26	GT	22	(United States) Alex Job Racing	(United States) Mike Fitzgerald (United States) Darryl Havens	Porsche 911 Carrera RSR	**Y**	104
26	GT	22	(United States) Alex Job Racing	(United States) Mike Fitzgerald (United States) Darryl Havens	Porsche 3.8 L Flat-6	**Y**	104
27 DNF	GT	02	(United States) Reiser Callas Rennsport	(United States) David Murry (United States) Craig Stanton	Porsche 911 Carrera RSR	**P**	101
27 DNF	GT	02	(United States) Reiser Callas Rennsport	(United States) David Murry (United States) Craig Stanton	Porsche 3.8 L Flat-6	**P**	101
28	GT	90	(United States) Millennium Motorsports	(United States) Chris Miller (United States) David Friedman	Porsche 911 Carrera RSR	**Y**	100
28	GT	90	(United States) Millennium Motorsports	(United States) Chris Miller (United States) David Friedman	Porsche 3.8 L Flat-6	**Y**	100
29	GT	39	(United States) Toad Hall Motor Racing	(United States) Darren Law (United States) Erik Johnson (United States) James Oppenheimer	Porsche 911 Carrera RSR	?	99
29	GT	39	(United States) Toad Hall Motor Racing	(United States) Darren Law (United States) Erik Johnson (United States) James Oppenheimer	Porsche 3.8 L Flat-6	?	99
30 DNF	GTS	50	(United States) Johnson Autosport	(United States) Jack Lewis (United States) Tim McGlynn	Porsche 911 Turbo	?	95
30 DNF	GTS	50	(United States) Johnson Autosport	(United States) Jack Lewis (United States) Tim McGlynn	Porsche 3.6 L Turbo Flat-6	?	95
31 DNF	LMP	06	(Canada) Multimatic Motorsports	(Canada) Scott Maxwell (Finland) Harri Toivonen	Lola B98/10	**P**	92
31 DNF	LMP	06	(Canada) Multimatic Motorsports	(Canada) Scott Maxwell (Finland) Harri Toivonen	Ford 5.1 L V8	**P**	92
32	GT	76	(United States) Team ARE	(United States) Peter Argetsinger (United States) Richard Polidori	Porsche 911 Carrera RSR	**Y**	91
32	GT	76	(United States) Team ARE	(United States) Peter Argetsinger (United States) Richard Polidori	Porsche 3.8 L Flat-6	**Y**	91
33	GT	73	(United States) Auto Sport South	(United States) Kevin Wheeler (United States) Brady Refenning	Porsche 911 Carrera RSR	?	89
33	GT	73	(United States) Auto Sport South	(United States) Kevin Wheeler (United States) Brady Refenning	Porsche 3.8 L Flat-6	?	89
34	GT	46	(United States) Team TransEnergy	(United States) Sam Shalala (United States) Bill Rollwitz	Porsche 911 Carrera RSR	?	85
34	GT	46	(United States) Team TransEnergy	(United States) Sam Shalala (United States) Bill Rollwitz	Porsche 3.8 L Flat-6	?	85
35	GT	64	(United States) Team Pumpelly Racing	(United States) Spencer Pumpelly (United States) Allan Ziegelman (United States) Paulo Lima	Porsche 911 Carrera RSR	?	81
35	GT	64	(United States) Team Pumpelly Racing	(United States) Spencer Pumpelly (United States) Allan Ziegelman (United States) Paulo Lima	Porsche 3.8 L Flat-6	?	81
36	GTS	83	(United States) Chiefie Motorsports	(United States) Andy Pilgrim (United States) Zak Brown	Porsche 911 GT2	?	72
36	GTS	83	(United States) Chiefie Motorsports	(United States) Andy Pilgrim (United States) Zak Brown	Porsche 3.6 L Turbo Flat-6	?	72
37 DNF	LMP	29	(United States) Intersport Racing	(United States) Sam Brown (United States) John Mirro	Riley & Scott Mk III	**G**	64
37 DNF	LMP	29	(United States) Intersport Racing	(United States) Sam Brown (United States) John Mirro	Ford (Roush) 6.0 L V8	**G**	64
38 DNF	LMP	28	(United States) Intersport Racing	(United States) Jon Field (United States) Ryan Jones	Lola B98/10	**G**	61
38 DNF	LMP	28	(United States) Intersport Racing	(United States) Jon Field (United States) Ryan Jones	Ford (Roush) 6.0 L V8	**G**	61
39 DNF	GT	03	(United States) Reiser Callas Rennsport	(United States) Grady Willingham (France) Michel Ligonnet	Porsche 911 Carrera RSR	**P**	43
39 DNF	GT	03	(United States) Reiser Callas Rennsport	(United States) Grady Willingham (France) Michel Ligonnet	Porsche 3.8 L Flat-6	**P**	43
40 DNF	LMP	38	(United States) Champion Racing	(Belgium) Thierry Boutsen (France) Bob Wollek	Porsche 911 GT1 Evo	**MI**	35
40 DNF	LMP	38	(United States) Champion Racing	(Belgium) Thierry Boutsen (France) Bob Wollek	Porsche 3.2 L Turbo Flat-6	**MI**	35
41 DNF	LMP	16	(United States) Dyson Racing	(United Kingdom) Andy Wallace (United Kingdom) James Weaver	Riley & Scott Mk III	**G**	33
41 DNF	LMP	16	(United States) Dyson Racing	(United Kingdom) Andy Wallace (United Kingdom) James Weaver	Ford 5.0 L V8	**G**	33
42 DNF	LMP	74	(United States) Robinson Racing	(United States) George Robinson (United States) Jack Baldwin	Riley & Scott Mk III	?	14
42 DNF	LMP	74	(United States) Robinson Racing	(United States) George Robinson (United States) Jack Baldwin	Chevrolet 6.0 L V8	?	14
43 DNF	LMP	32	(United States) Genesis Racing	(United States) Rick Fairbanks (United States) Jeff Altenburg	Hawk MD3R	?	9
43 DNF	LMP	32	(United States) Genesis Racing	(United States) Rick Fairbanks (United States) Jeff Altenburg	Chevrolet 6.0 L V8	?	9
44 DNF	LMP	2	(United States) Panoz Motor Sports	(United States) Johnny O'Connell (Denmark) Jan Magnussen	Panoz GTR-1	**MI**	0
44 DNF	LMP	2	(United States) Panoz Motor Sports	(United States) Johnny O'Connell (Denmark) Jan Magnussen	Ford (Roush) 6.0 L V8	**MI**	0
DNS	GT	07	(United States) G & W Motorsports	(United States) Steve Marshall (United States) Danny Marshall (United States) Darren Law	Porsche 911 GT2 Evo	**P**	-
DNS	GT	07	(United States) G & W Motorsports	(United States) Steve Marshall (United States) Danny Marshall (United States) Darren Law	Porsche 3.8 L Turbo Flat-6	**P**	-

== Statistics ==
- Pole Position - #16 Dyson Racing (Andy Wallace) - 1:13.817
- Fastest Lap - #0 Team Rafanelli (Eric van de Poele) - 1:14.150
- Distance - 490.528 km (304.800 mi)
- Average Speed - 177.145 km/h (110.073 mph)

American Le Mans Series
Previous race: 1999 12 Hours of Sebring	1999 season	Next race: 1999 Grand Prix of Mosport
