= 1999 Rose City Grand Prix =

Track map of Portland International Raceway

The 1999 Rose City Grand Prix was the fifth round of the 1999 American Le Mans Series season. It took place at Portland International Raceway, Oregon, on August 1, 1999.

== Race results ==
Class winners in bold.

Pos	Class	No	Team	Drivers	Chassis	Tyre	Laps
Pos	Class	No	Team	Drivers	Engine	Tyre	Laps
1	**LMP**	**1**	**(United States) Panoz Motor Sports**	**(Australia) David Brabham (France) Éric Bernard**	**Panoz LMP-1 Roadster-S**	**MI**	**137**
1	**LMP**	**1**	**(United States) Panoz Motor Sports**	**(Australia) David Brabham (France) Éric Bernard**	**Ford (Élan-Yates) 6.0 L V8**	**MI**	**137**
2	LMP	42	(Germany) BMW Motorsport (Germany) Schnitzer Motorsport	(Finland) JJ Lehto (United Kingdom) Steve Soper	BMW V12 LMR	**MI**	137
2	LMP	42	(Germany) BMW Motorsport (Germany) Schnitzer Motorsport	(Finland) JJ Lehto (United Kingdom) Steve Soper	BMW S70 6.0 L V12	**MI**	137
3	LMP	2	(United States) Panoz Motor Sports	(United States) Johnny O'Connell (Denmark) Jan Magnussen	Panoz LMP-1 Roadster-S	**MI**	137
3	LMP	2	(United States) Panoz Motor Sports	(United States) Johnny O'Connell (Denmark) Jan Magnussen	Ford (Élan-Yates) 6.0 L V8	**MI**	137
4	LMP	43	(Germany) BMW Motorsport (Germany) Schnitzer Motorsport	(Germany) Joachim Winkelhock (United States) Bill Auberlen	BMW V12 LMR	**MI**	136
4	LMP	43	(Germany) BMW Motorsport (Germany) Schnitzer Motorsport	(Germany) Joachim Winkelhock (United States) Bill Auberlen	BMW S70 6.0 L V12	**MI**	136
5	LMP	27	(United Kingdom) Price & Bscher	(Germany) Thomas Bscher (Portugal) Pedro Lamy	BMW V12 LM	**Y**	134
5	LMP	27	(United Kingdom) Price & Bscher	(Germany) Thomas Bscher (Portugal) Pedro Lamy	BMW S70 6.0 L V12	**Y**	134
6	LMP	16	(United States) Dyson Racing	(United States) Elliott Forbes-Robinson (United Kingdom) James Weaver (Canada) Ron Fellows	Riley & Scott Mk III	**G**	134
6	LMP	16	(United States) Dyson Racing	(United States) Elliott Forbes-Robinson (United Kingdom) James Weaver (Canada) Ron Fellows	Ford 5.0 L V8	**G**	134
7	LMP	0	(Italy) Team Rafanelli SRL	(France) Érik Comas (Italy) Mimmo Schiattarella	Riley & Scott Mk III	**Y**	134
7	LMP	0	(Italy) Team Rafanelli SRL	(France) Érik Comas (Italy) Mimmo Schiattarella	Judd GV4 4.0 L V10	**Y**	134
8	LMP	38	(United States) Champion Racing	(United Kingdom) Allan McNish (United States) Andy Pilgrim	Porsche 911 GT1 Evo	**MI**	133
8	LMP	38	(United States) Champion Racing	(United Kingdom) Allan McNish (United States) Andy Pilgrim	Porsche 3.2 L Turbo Flat-6	**MI**	133
9	LMP	11	(United States) Doyle-Risi Racing	(Italy) Max Angelelli (Belgium) Didier de Radiguès	Ferrari 333 SP	**P**	131
9	LMP	11	(United States) Doyle-Risi Racing	(Italy) Max Angelelli (Belgium) Didier de Radiguès	Ferrari F310E 4.0L V12	**P**	131
10	LMP	18	(United States) Dollahite Racing	(United States) Bill Dollahite (United States) Mike Davies	Ferrari 333 SP	**P**	130
10	LMP	18	(United States) Dollahite Racing	(United States) Bill Dollahite (United States) Mike Davies	Ferrari F310E 4.0 L V12	**P**	130
11 DNF	LMP	12	(United States) Doyle-Risi Racing	(Italy) Alex Caffi (South Africa) Wayne Taylor	Ferrari 333 SP	**P**	129
11 DNF	LMP	12	(United States) Doyle-Risi Racing	(Italy) Alex Caffi (South Africa) Wayne Taylor	Ferrari F310E 4.0 L V12	**P**	129
12	LMP	36	(United States) Doran Lista Racing (United States) Jim Matthews Racing	(Sweden) Stefan Johansson (United States) Jim Matthews	Ferrari 333 SP	**MI**	128
12	LMP	36	(United States) Doran Lista Racing (United States) Jim Matthews Racing	(Sweden) Stefan Johansson (United States) Jim Matthews	Ferrari F310E 4.0 L V12	**MI**	128
13	**GTS**	**91**	**(France) Dodge Viper Team Oreca**	**(Monaco) Olivier Beretta (United States) David Donohue**	**Dodge Viper GTS-R**	**MI**	**126**
13	**GTS**	**91**	**(France) Dodge Viper Team Oreca**	**(Monaco) Olivier Beretta (United States) David Donohue**	**Dodge 8.0 L V10**	**MI**	**126**
14	GTS	92	(France) Dodge Viper Team Oreca	(Austria) Karl Wendlinger (United States) Tommy Archer	Dodge Viper GTS-R	**MI**	126
14	GTS	92	(France) Dodge Viper Team Oreca	(Austria) Karl Wendlinger (United States) Tommy Archer	Dodge 8.0 L V10	**MI**	126
15	GTS	61	(Germany) Konrad Motorsport	(Austria) Franz Konrad (France) Bob Wollek	Porsche 911 GT2	**D**	125
15	GTS	61	(Germany) Konrad Motorsport	(Austria) Franz Konrad (France) Bob Wollek	Porsche 3.6 L Turbo Flat-6	**D**	125
16 DNF	LMP	28	(United States) Intersport Racing	(United States) Jon Field (Sweden) Niclas Jönsson	Lola B98/10	**G**	124
16 DNF	LMP	28	(United States) Intersport Racing	(United States) Jon Field (Sweden) Niclas Jönsson	Ford (Roush) 6.0 L V8	**G**	124
17	GTS	56	(United States) Martin Snow Racing	(United States) Martin Snow (United States) Kelly Collins	Porsche 911 GT2	**MI**	123
17	GTS	56	(United States) Martin Snow Racing	(United States) Martin Snow (United States) Kelly Collins	Porsche 3.6 L Turbo Flat-6	**MI**	123
18^{†}	**GT**	**23**	**(Germany) Manthey Racing (United States) Alex Job Racing**	**(Germany) Dirk Müller (United States) Cort Wagner**	**Porsche 911 GT3-R**	**MI**	**122**
18^{†}	**GT**	**23**	**(Germany) Manthey Racing (United States) Alex Job Racing**	**(Germany) Dirk Müller (United States) Cort Wagner**	**Porsche 3.6 L Flat-6**	**MI**	**122**
19	GT	7	(United States) Prototype Technology Group	(United States) Brian Cunningham (Germany) Christian Menzel	BMW M3	**Y**	121
19	GT	7	(United States) Prototype Technology Group	(United States) Brian Cunningham (Germany) Christian Menzel	BMW 3.2 L I6	**Y**	121
20	GT	10	(United States) Prototype Technology Group	(United States) Darren Law (United States) Johannes van Overbeek	BMW M3	**Y**	121
20	GT	10	(United States) Prototype Technology Group	(United States) Darren Law (United States) Johannes van Overbeek	BMW 3.2 L I6	**Y**	121
21	GT	17	(United States) Contemporary Motorsports	(United States) Joe Varde (Belgium) Bruno Lambert	Porsche 911 Carrera RSR	?	120
21	GT	17	(United States) Contemporary Motorsports	(United States) Joe Varde (Belgium) Bruno Lambert	Porsche 3.8 L Flat-6	?	120
22	GT	02	(United States) Reiser Callas Rennsport	(United States) Doc Bundy (United States) David Murry	Porsche 911 Carrera RSR	**P**	120
22	GT	02	(United States) Reiser Callas Rennsport	(United States) Doc Bundy (United States) David Murry	Porsche 3.8 L Flat-6	**P**	120
23 DNF	GT	6	(United States) Prototype Technology Group	(United States) Peter Cunningham (United States) Mark Simo	BMW M3	**Y**	119
23 DNF	GT	6	(United States) Prototype Technology Group	(United States) Peter Cunningham (United States) Mark Simo	BMW 3.2 L I6	**Y**	119
24	GT	22	(United States) Alex Job Racing	(United States) Mike Fitzgerald (United States) Darryl Havens	Porsche 911 Carrera RSR	**Y**	119
24	GT	22	(United States) Alex Job Racing	(United States) Mike Fitzgerald (United States) Darryl Havens	Porsche 3.8 L Flat-6	**Y**	119
25	GT	68	(United States) The Racer's Group	(United States) Spencer Trenery (United States) Vic Rice	Porsche 911 Carrera RSR	**G**	119
25	GT	68	(United States) The Racer's Group	(United States) Spencer Trenery (United States) Vic Rice	Porsche 3.8 L Flat-6	**G**	119
26	GT	24	(United States) Alex Job Racing	(United States) Randy Pobst (United States) Don Kitch	Porsche 911 Carrera RSR	**Y**	119
26	GT	24	(United States) Alex Job Racing	(United States) Randy Pobst (United States) Don Kitch	Porsche 3.8 L Flat-6	**Y**	119
27	GT	03	(United States) Reiser Callas Rennsport	(United States) Grady Willingham (United States) Joel Reiser (United States) Craig Stanton	Porsche 911 Carrera RSR	**P**	118
27	GT	03	(United States) Reiser Callas Rennsport	(United States) Grady Willingham (United States) Joel Reiser (United States) Craig Stanton	Porsche 3.8 L Flat-6	**P**	118
28 DNF	GTS	48	(Germany) Freisinger Motorsport	(Germany) Wolfgang Kaufmann (France) Michel Ligonnet	Porsche 911 GT2	**D**	115
28 DNF	GTS	48	(Germany) Freisinger Motorsport	(Germany) Wolfgang Kaufmann (France) Michel Ligonnet	Porsche 3.6 L Turbo Flat-6	**D**	115
29	LMP	63	(United States) Downing Atlanta	(United States) Jim Downing (United States) Chris Ronson	Kudzu DLY	**G**	115
29	LMP	63	(United States) Downing Atlanta	(United States) Jim Downing (United States) Chris Ronson	Mazda R26B 2.6 L 4-Rotor	**G**	115
30 DNF	LMP	97	(United States) Team Cascadia	(United States) Ed Zabinski (United States) Shane Lewis	Lola B98/10	**P**	113
30 DNF	LMP	97	(United States) Team Cascadia	(United States) Ed Zabinski (United States) Shane Lewis	Chevrolet 6.0 L V8	**P**	113
31	LMP	29	(United States) Intersport Racing	(United States) Paul Debban (United States) Bruce Trenery	Riley & Scott Mk III	**G**	111
31	LMP	29	(United States) Intersport Racing	(United States) Paul Debban (United States) Bruce Trenery	Ford (Roush) 6.0 L V8	**G**	111
32	GT	65	(United States) Pregrid Motorsports	(United States) John Brosius (United States) Jonathan Fay	Porsche 911 3.8 Cup	?	110
32	GT	65	(United States) Pregrid Motorsports	(United States) John Brosius (United States) Jonathan Fay	Porsche 3.8 L Flat-6	?	110
33	LMP	8	(United States) Transatlantic Racing	(United States) Scott Schubot (United States) Henry Camferdam	Riley & Scott Mk III	**G**	108
33	LMP	8	(United States) Transatlantic Racing	(United States) Scott Schubot (United States) Henry Camferdam	Ford 5.0 L V8	**G**	108
34 DNF	GTS	55	(United States) Saleen/Allen Speedlab	(United States) Terry Borcheller (United States) Ron Johnson	Saleen Mustang SR	**P**	106
34 DNF	GTS	55	(United States) Saleen/Allen Speedlab	(United States) Terry Borcheller (United States) Ron Johnson	Ford 8.0 L V8	**P**	106
35 DNF	GT	25	(Germany) RWS Motorsport	(Austria) Hans-Jörg Hofer (Italy) Luca Riccitelli	Porsche 911 GT3-R	**MI**	86
35 DNF	GT	25	(Germany) RWS Motorsport	(Austria) Hans-Jörg Hofer (Italy) Luca Riccitelli	Porsche 3.6 L Flat-6	**MI**	86
36 DNF	GTS	83	(United States) Chiefie Motorsports	(Italy) Stefano Buttiero (United States) Zak Brown	Porsche 911 GT2	?	70
36 DNF	GTS	83	(United States) Chiefie Motorsports	(Italy) Stefano Buttiero (United States) Zak Brown	Porsche 3.6 L Turbo Flat-6	?	70
37 DNF	LMP	74	(United States) Robinson Racing	(United States) George Robinson (United States) Jack Baldwin	Riley & Scott Mk III	?	49
37 DNF	LMP	74	(United States) Robinson Racing	(United States) George Robinson (United States) Jack Baldwin	Chevrolet 6.0 L V8	?	49
38 DNF	LMP	27	(United States) Doran Lista Racing	(Belgium) Didier Theys (Switzerland) Fredy Lienhard	Ferrari 333 SP	**MI**	41
38 DNF	LMP	27	(United States) Doran Lista Racing	(Belgium) Didier Theys (Switzerland) Fredy Lienhard	Ferrari F310E 4.0 L V12	**MI**	41
39 DNF	LMP	15	(United States) Hybrid R&D	(United States) Chris Bingham (Canada) Ross Bentley	Riley & Scott Mk III	**Y**	34
39 DNF	LMP	15	(United States) Hybrid R&D	(United States) Chris Bingham (Canada) Ross Bentley	Ford 5.0 L V8	**Y**	34
40 DNF	LMP	20	(United States) Dyson Racing	(United States) Butch Leitzinger (United States) Elliott Forbes-Robinson	Riley & Scott Mk III	**G**	9
40 DNF	LMP	20	(United States) Dyson Racing	(United States) Butch Leitzinger (United States) Elliott Forbes-Robinson	Ford 5.0 L V8	**G**	9
41 DNF	GT	9	(United States) Prototype Technology Group	(United States) Boris Said (Germany) Hans-Joachim Stuck	BMW M3	**Y**	8
41 DNF	GT	9	(United States) Prototype Technology Group	(United States) Boris Said (Germany) Hans-Joachim Stuck	BMW 3.2 L I6	**Y**	8
42 DNF	GT	67	(United States) The Racer's Group	(United States) Kevin Buckler (United States) Kim Wolfkill (United States) Kimberly Hiskey	Porsche 911 Carrera RSR	**G**	0
42 DNF	GT	67	(United States) The Racer's Group	(United States) Kevin Buckler (United States) Kim Wolfkill (United States) Kimberly Hiskey	Porsche 3.8 L Flat-6	**G**	0

† - #18 Manthey Racing was found to be in violation of PSCR regulations in post-race inspection, the car being below the minimum legal ride height. Manthey Racing and their drivers were penalized by not winning championship points in this round.

== Statistics ==
- Pole position - #42 BMW Motorsport (J.J. Lehto) - 1:04.387
- Fastest lap - #42 BMW Motorsport (J.J. Lehto) - 1:05.451
- Distance - 428.613 km (266.328 mi)
- Average speed - 155.033 km/h (96.333 mph)

American Le Mans Series
Previous race: 1999 Grand Prix of Sonoma	1999 season	Next race: 1999 Petit Le Mans
