= Hawk MD3R =

- Category: LMGTP
- Designer(s): Howard Heerey

Technical specifications
- Chassis: Carbon-fiber monocoque
- Engine: Mazda 3-Rotor; Chevrolet V8
- Transmission: 6-speed manual
- Weight: 675 kg (1488 lbs)
- Tyres: Goodyear

Competition history
- Notable entrants: (United States) Support Net Racing Inc (United States) Team South Carolina (United States) Genesis Racing
- Debut: 1994 Grand Prix of Atlanta
- Last event: 1999 Grand Prix of Atlanta
Races	Wins	Poles	F/Laps
27	0	0	0

The Hawk MD3R is a Le Mans Prototype mid-engine, rear-wheel drive race car chassis raced between 1994 and 1995 and 1997 and 2001, on tracks such as Daytona International Speedway, Sebring, and Laguna Seca. It is often complemented by Mazda engines, such as the 2.0 L 3-Rotor, however it has also been raced with a Chevrolet engine The vehicle has been run most frequently by Support Net Racing Inc., Team South Carolina and Genesis Racing
