= 1999 Grand Prix of Sonoma =

Motor racing meeting

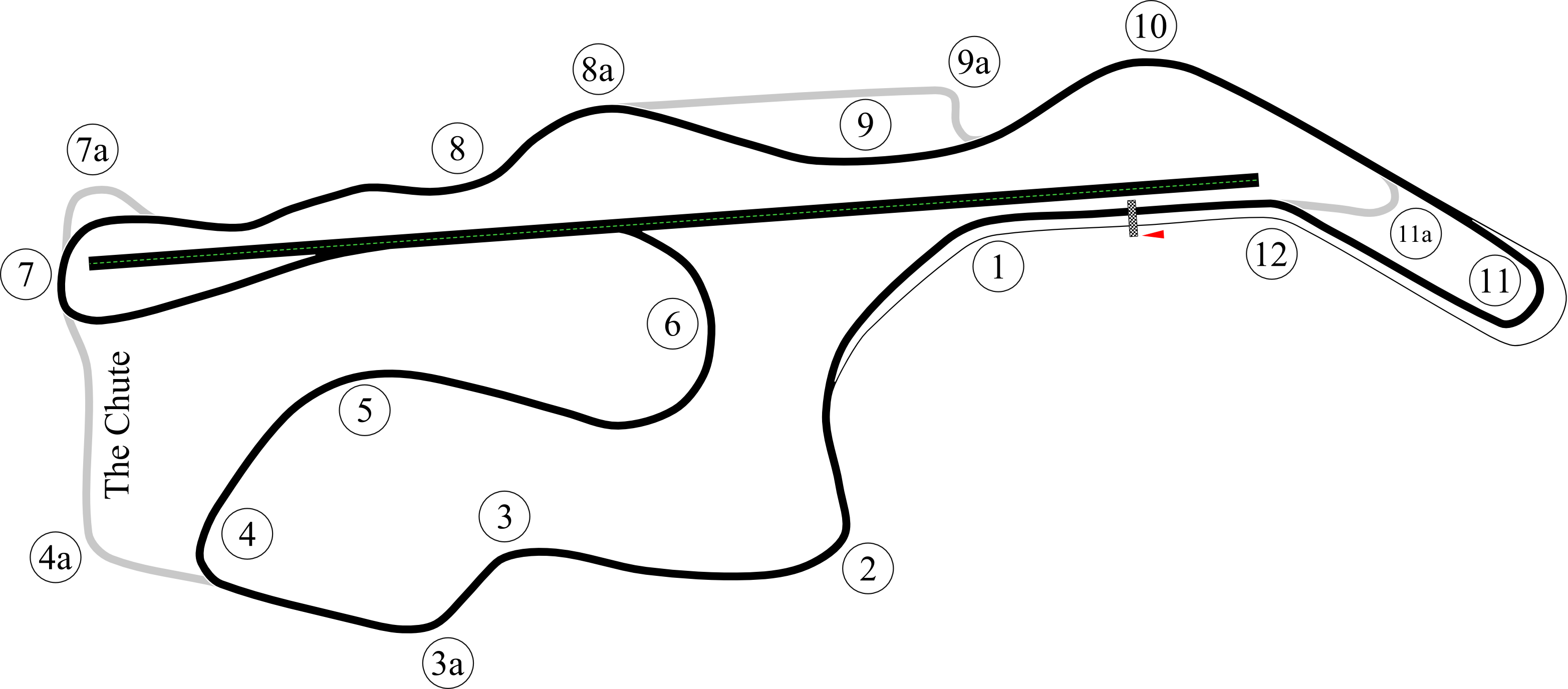
Sonoma Raceway

The 1999 Grand Prix of Sonoma was the fourth round of the 1999 American Le Mans Series season. It took place at Sears Point Raceway, California, on July 25, 1999.

== Race results ==
Class winners in bold.

Pos	Class	No	Team	Drivers	Chassis	Tyre	Laps
Pos	Class	No	Team	Drivers	Engine	Tyre	Laps
1	**LMP**	**42**	**(Germany) BMW Motorsport (Germany) Schnitzer Motorsport**	**(Finland) JJ Lehto (United Kingdom) Steve Soper**	**BMW V12 LMR**	**M**	**97**
1	**LMP**	**42**	**(Germany) BMW Motorsport (Germany) Schnitzer Motorsport**	**(Finland) JJ Lehto (United Kingdom) Steve Soper**	**BMW S70 6.0 L V12**	**M**	**97**
2	LMP	1	(United States) Panoz Motor Sports	(Australia) David Brabham (France) Éric Bernard	Panoz LMP-1 Roadster-S	**M**	97
2	LMP	1	(United States) Panoz Motor Sports	(Australia) David Brabham (France) Éric Bernard	Ford (Élan-Yates) 6.0 L V8	**M**	97
3	LMP	2	(United States) Panoz Motor Sports	(United States) Johnny O'Connell (Denmark) Jan Magnussen	Panoz LMP-1 Roadster-S	**M**	96
3	LMP	2	(United States) Panoz Motor Sports	(United States) Johnny O'Connell (Denmark) Jan Magnussen	Ford (Élan-Yates) 6.0 L V8	**M**	96
4	LMP	20	(United States) Dyson Racing	(United States) Butch Leitzinger (United States) Elliott Forbes-Robinson	Riley & Scott Mk III	**G**	96
4	LMP	20	(United States) Dyson Racing	(United States) Butch Leitzinger (United States) Elliott Forbes-Robinson	Ford 5.0 L V8	**G**	96
5	LMP	43	(Germany) BMW Motorsport (Germany) Schnitzer Motorsport	(Germany) Joachim Winkelhock (United States) Bill Auberlen	BMW V12 LMR	**M**	96
5	LMP	43	(Germany) BMW Motorsport (Germany) Schnitzer Motorsport	(Germany) Joachim Winkelhock (United States) Bill Auberlen	BMW S70 6.0 L V12	**M**	96
6	LMP	0	(Italy) Team Rafanelli SRL	(France) Érik Comas (Italy) Mimmo Schiattarella	Riley & Scott Mk III	**Y**	96
6	LMP	0	(Italy) Team Rafanelli SRL	(France) Érik Comas (Italy) Mimmo Schiattarella	Judd GV4 4.0 L V10	**Y**	96
7	LMP	27	(United Kingdom) Price & Bscher	(Germany) Thomas Bscher (Portugal) Pedro Lamy	BMW V12 LM	**Y**	95
7	LMP	27	(United Kingdom) Price & Bscher	(Germany) Thomas Bscher (Portugal) Pedro Lamy	BMW S70 6.0 L V12	**Y**	95
8	LMP	36	(United States) Doran Lista Racing (United States) Jim Matthews Racing	(Sweden) Stefan Johansson (United States) Jim Matthews	Ferrari 333 SP	**M**	94
8	LMP	36	(United States) Doran Lista Racing (United States) Jim Matthews Racing	(Sweden) Stefan Johansson (United States) Jim Matthews	Ferrari F310E 4.0 L V12	**M**	94
9	LMP	27	(United States) Doran Lista Racing	(Belgium) Didier Theys (Switzerland) Fredy Lienhard	Ferrari 333 SP	**M**	94
9	LMP	27	(United States) Doran Lista Racing	(Belgium) Didier Theys (Switzerland) Fredy Lienhard	Ferrari F310E 4.0 L V12	**M**	94
10	LMP	11	(United States) Doyle-Risi Racing	(Italy) Max Angelelli (Belgium) Didier de Radiguès	Ferrari 333 SP	**P**	94
10	LMP	11	(United States) Doyle-Risi Racing	(Italy) Max Angelelli (Belgium) Didier de Radiguès	Ferrari F310E 4.0 L V12	**P**	94
11	LMP	74	(United States) Robinson Racing	(United States) George Robinson (United States) Jack Baldwin	Riley & Scott Mk III	?	93
11	LMP	74	(United States) Robinson Racing	(United States) George Robinson (United States) Jack Baldwin	Chevrolet 6.0 L V8	?	93
12	LMP	38	(United States) Champion Racing	(United Kingdom) Allan McNish (United States) Andy Pilgrim	Porsche 911 GT1 Evo	**M**	93
12	LMP	38	(United States) Champion Racing	(United Kingdom) Allan McNish (United States) Andy Pilgrim	Porsche 3.2 L Turbo Flat-6	**M**	93
13	LMP	16	(United States) Dyson Racing	(United States) Rob Dyson (United Kingdom) James Weaver	Riley & Scott Mk III	**G**	93
13	LMP	16	(United States) Dyson Racing	(United States) Rob Dyson (United Kingdom) James Weaver	Ford 5.0 L V8	**G**	93
14	LMP	18	(United States) Dollahite Racing	(United States) Bill Dollahite (United States) Mike Davies	Ferrari 333 SP	**P**	92
14	LMP	18	(United States) Dollahite Racing	(United States) Bill Dollahite (United States) Mike Davies	Ferrari F310E 4.0 L V12	**P**	92
15	LMP	15	(United States) Hybrid R&D	(United States) Chris Bingham (Canada) Ross Bentley	Riley & Scott Mk III	**Y**	92
15	LMP	15	(United States) Hybrid R&D	(United States) Chris Bingham (Canada) Ross Bentley	Ford 5.0 L V8	**Y**	92
16	LMP	8	(United States) Transatlantic Racing	(United States) Scott Schubot (United States) Rick Sutherland	Riley & Scott Mk III	**G**	90
16	LMP	8	(United States) Transatlantic Racing	(United States) Scott Schubot (United States) Rick Sutherland	Ford 5.0 L V8	**G**	90
17	**GTS**	**91**	**(France) Dodge Viper Team Oreca**	**(Monaco) Olivier Beretta (United States) David Donohue**	**Dodge Viper GTS-R**	**M**	**90**
17	**GTS**	**91**	**(France) Dodge Viper Team Oreca**	**(Monaco) Olivier Beretta (United States) David Donohue**	**Dodge 8.0 L V10**	**M**	**90**
18	GTS	3	(United States) Corvette Racing	(United States) Chris Kneifel (Canada) Ron Fellows	Chevrolet Corvette C5-R	**G**	89
18	GTS	3	(United States) Corvette Racing	(United States) Chris Kneifel (Canada) Ron Fellows	Chevrolet 6.0 L V8	**G**	89
19	GTS	92	(France) Dodge Viper Team Oreca	(Austria) Karl Wendlinger (United States) Tommy Archer	Dodge Viper GTS-R	**M**	89
19	GTS	92	(France) Dodge Viper Team Oreca	(Austria) Karl Wendlinger (United States) Tommy Archer	Dodge 8.0 L V10	**M**	89
20	GTS	55	(United States) Saleen/Allen Speedlab	(United States) Terry Borcheller (United States) Ron Johnson	Saleen Mustang SR	**P**	88
20	GTS	55	(United States) Saleen/Allen Speedlab	(United States) Terry Borcheller (United States) Ron Johnson	Ford 8.0 L V8	**P**	88
21	GTS	56	(United States) Martin Snow Racing	(United States) Martin Snow (United States) Kelly Collins	Porsche 911 GT2	**M**	88
21	GTS	56	(United States) Martin Snow Racing	(United States) Martin Snow (United States) Kelly Collins	Porsche 3.6 L Turbo Flat-6	**M**	88
22	**GT**	**9**	**(United States) Prototype Technology Group**	**(United States) Boris Said (Germany) Hans-Joachim Stuck**	**BMW M3**	**Y**	**88**
22	**GT**	**9**	**(United States) Prototype Technology Group**	**(United States) Boris Said (Germany) Hans-Joachim Stuck**	**BMW 3.2 L I6**	**Y**	**88**
23	GT	23	(Germany) Manthey Racing (United States) Alex Job Racing	(Germany) Dirk Müller (United States) Cort Wagner	Porsche 911 GT3-R	**M**	88
23	GT	23	(Germany) Manthey Racing (United States) Alex Job Racing	(Germany) Dirk Müller (United States) Cort Wagner	Porsche 3.6 L Flat-6	**M**	88
24	GTS	48	(Germany) Freisinger Motorsport	(Germany) Wolfgang Kaufmann (France) Michel Ligonnet	Porsche 911 GT2	**D**	87
24	GTS	48	(Germany) Freisinger Motorsport	(Germany) Wolfgang Kaufmann (France) Michel Ligonnet	Porsche 3.6 L Turbo Flat-6	**D**	87
25	GTS	61	(Germany) Konrad Motorsport	(Austria) Franz Konrad (France) Bob Wollek	Porsche 911 GT2	**D**	87
25	GTS	61	(Germany) Konrad Motorsport	(Austria) Franz Konrad (France) Bob Wollek	Porsche 3.6 L Turbo Flat-6	**D**	87
26	GT	10	(United States) Prototype Technology Group	(United States) Darren Law (United States) Johannes van Overbeek	BMW M3	**Y**	87
26	GT	10	(United States) Prototype Technology Group	(United States) Darren Law (United States) Johannes van Overbeek	BMW 3.2 L I6	**Y**	87
27	GT	22	(United States) Alex Job Racing	(United States) Mike Fitzgerald (United States) Darryl Havens	Porsche 911 Carrera RSR	**Y**	86
27	GT	22	(United States) Alex Job Racing	(United States) Mike Fitzgerald (United States) Darryl Havens	Porsche 3.8 L Flat-6	**Y**	86
28	GT	24	(United States) Alex Job Racing	(United States) Randy Pobst (United States) Jim Kelly	Porsche 911 Carrera RSR	**Y**	86
28	GT	24	(United States) Alex Job Racing	(United States) Randy Pobst (United States) Jim Kelly	Porsche 3.8 L Flat-6	**Y**	86
29	GT	02	(United States) Reiser Callas Rennsport	(United States) Doc Bundy (United States) David Murry	Porsche 911 Carrera RSR	**P**	86
29	GT	02	(United States) Reiser Callas Rennsport	(United States) Doc Bundy (United States) David Murry	Porsche 3.8 L Flat-6	**P**	86
30	GT	68	(United States) The Racer's Group	(United States) Kevin Buckler (United States) Vic Rice	Porsche 911 Carrera RSR	**G**	85
30	GT	68	(United States) The Racer's Group	(United States) Kevin Buckler (United States) Vic Rice	Porsche 3.8 L Flat-6	**G**	85
31	GT	03	(United States) Reiser Callas Rennsport	(United States) Grady Willingham (United States) Joel Reiser (United States) Craig Stanton	Porsche 911 Carrera RSR	**P**	85
31	GT	03	(United States) Reiser Callas Rennsport	(United States) Grady Willingham (United States) Joel Reiser (United States) Craig Stanton	Porsche 3.8 L Flat-6	**P**	85
32	GT	25	(Germany) RWS Motorsport	(Austria) Hans-Jörg Hofer (Italy) Luca Riccitelli	Porsche 911 GT3-R	**M**	84
32	GT	25	(Germany) RWS Motorsport	(Austria) Hans-Jörg Hofer (Italy) Luca Riccitelli	Porsche 3.6 L Flat-6	**M**	84
33	GTS	83	(United States) Chiefie Motorsports	(Italy) Stefano Buttiero (United States) Zak Brown	Porsche 911 GT2	?	83
33	GTS	83	(United States) Chiefie Motorsports	(Italy) Stefano Buttiero (United States) Zak Brown	Porsche 3.6 L Turbo Flat-6	?	83
34	GT	67	(United States) The Racer's Group	(United States) Michael Schrom (United States) Spencer Trenery	Porsche 911 Carrera RSR	**G**	83
34	GT	67	(United States) The Racer's Group	(United States) Michael Schrom (United States) Spencer Trenery	Porsche 3.8 L Flat-6	**G**	83
35	GT	88	(United States) Vanderhoof Racing	(United States) Joe Varde (United States) Tim Ralston	Porsche 911 Carrera RSR	?	82
35	GT	88	(United States) Vanderhoof Racing	(United States) Joe Varde (United States) Tim Ralston	Porsche 3.8 L Flat-6	?	82
36 DNF	GT	6	(United States) Prototype Technology Group	(United States) Peter Cunningham (United States) Mark Simo	BMW M3	**Y**	79
36 DNF	GT	6	(United States) Prototype Technology Group	(United States) Peter Cunningham (United States) Mark Simo	BMW 3.2 L I6	**Y**	79
37	GT	17	(United States) Contemporary Motorsports	(United States) Mike Conte (Belgium) Bruno Lambert	Porsche 911 Carrera RSR	?	78
37	GT	17	(United States) Contemporary Motorsports	(United States) Mike Conte (Belgium) Bruno Lambert	Porsche 3.8 L Flat-6	?	78
38 DNF	LMP	12	(United States) Doyle-Risi Racing	(Italy) Alex Caffi (South Africa) Wayne Taylor	Ferrari 333 SP	**P**	73
38 DNF	LMP	12	(United States) Doyle-Risi Racing	(Italy) Alex Caffi (South Africa) Wayne Taylor	Ferrari F310E 4.0 L V12	**P**	73
39	LMP	63	(United States) Downing Atlanta	(United States) Jim Downing (United States) Chris Ronson	Kudzu DLY	**G**	63
39	LMP	63	(United States) Downing Atlanta	(United States) Jim Downing (United States) Chris Ronson	Mazda R26B 2.6 L 4-Rotor	**G**	63
40 DNF	LMP	28	(United States) Intersport Racing	(United States) Jon Field (Sweden) Niclas Jönsson	Lola B98/10	**G**	38
40 DNF	LMP	28	(United States) Intersport Racing	(United States) Jon Field (Sweden) Niclas Jönsson	Ford (Roush) 6.0 L V8	**G**	38
41 DNF	GT	76	(United States) Team ARE	(United States) Harry Rady (United States) Simon Sobrero	Porsche 911 Carrera RSR	**Y**	36
41 DNF	GT	76	(United States) Team ARE	(United States) Harry Rady (United States) Simon Sobrero	Porsche 3.8 L Flat-6	**Y**	36
42 DNF	GT	7	(United States) Prototype Technology Group	(United States) Brian Cunningham (Germany) Christian Menzel	BMW M3	**Y**	2
42 DNF	GT	7	(United States) Prototype Technology Group	(United States) Brian Cunningham (Germany) Christian Menzel	BMW 3.2 L I6	**Y**	2
DNQ	LMP	97	(United States) Team Cascadia	(United States) Ed Zabinski (United States) Shane Lewis	Lola B98/10	**P**	-
DNQ	LMP	97	(United States) Team Cascadia	(United States) Ed Zabinski (United States) Shane Lewis	Chevrolet 6.0 L V8	**P**	-
DNQ	LMP	29	(United States) Intersport Racing	(United States) Sam Brown (United States) Steve Romak (United States) John Mirro	Riley & Scott Mk III	**G**	-
DNQ	LMP	29	(United States) Intersport Racing	(United States) Sam Brown (United States) Steve Romak (United States) John Mirro	Ford (Roush) 6.0 L V8	**G**	-
DNQ	LMP	60	(United States) Kopf Precision Products	(United States) Kris Wilson (United States) Tim Moser	Keiler KII	?	-
DNQ	LMP	60	(United States) Kopf Precision Products	(United States) Kris Wilson (United States) Tim Moser	Ford 5.0 L V8	?	-

== Statistics ==
- Pole Position - #42 BMW Motorsport (J.J. Lehto) - 1:22.387
- Fastest Lap - #42 BMW Motorsport (J.J. Lehto) - 1:23.835
- Distance - 393.388 km (244.440 mi)
- Average Speed - 143.890 km/h (89.409 mph)

American Le Mans Series
Previous race: 1999 Grand Prix of Mosport	1999 season	Next race: 1999 Rose City Grand Prix
