= 1999 Grand Prix of Mosport =

Mosport International Raceway

The 1999 Grand Prix of Mosport was an American Le Mans Series professional sports car race held at Mosport International Raceway near Bowmanville, Ontario, Canada from June 25 to the 27, 1999. The race was the third round of the inaugural American Le Mans Series season, replacing the former Professional SportsCar Racing Championship that previously held the Grand Prix beginning in 1975. The race marked the 14th IMSA / Professional SportsCar Racing sanctioned sports car race held at the facility.

== Race ==
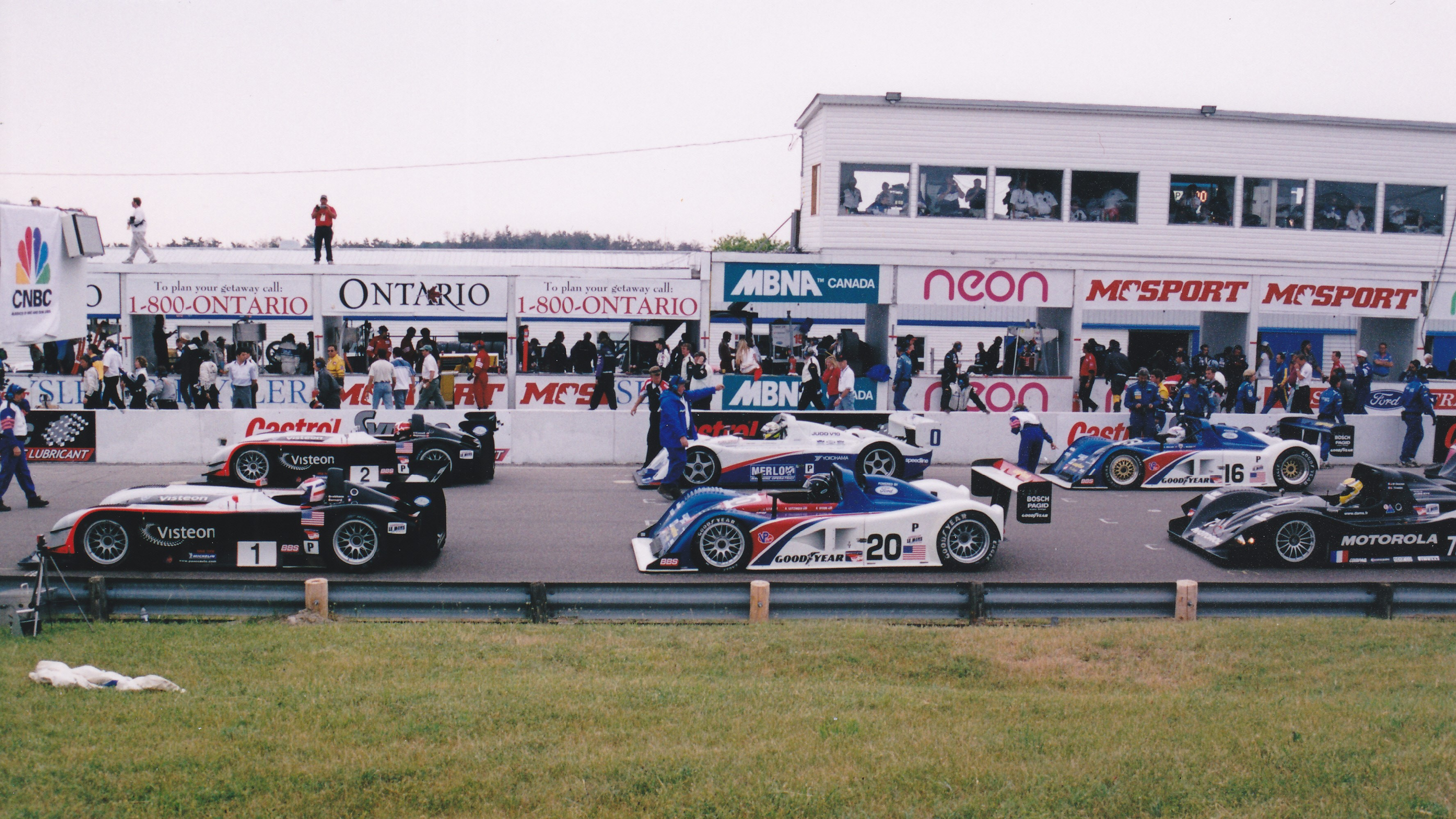
Pre-Race Grid

The race marked the maiden win for the Panoz LMP-1 Roadster-S driven by Johnny O'Connell and Jan Magnussen for Panoz Motor Sports. It was the first front-engine sportscar overall win at a major event since the 1960s. Teammates David Brabham and Éric Bernard in the #1 Panoz finished second, while Team Rafanelli drivers Érik Comas and Mimmo Schiattarella took third overall in the Riley & Scott Mk III.

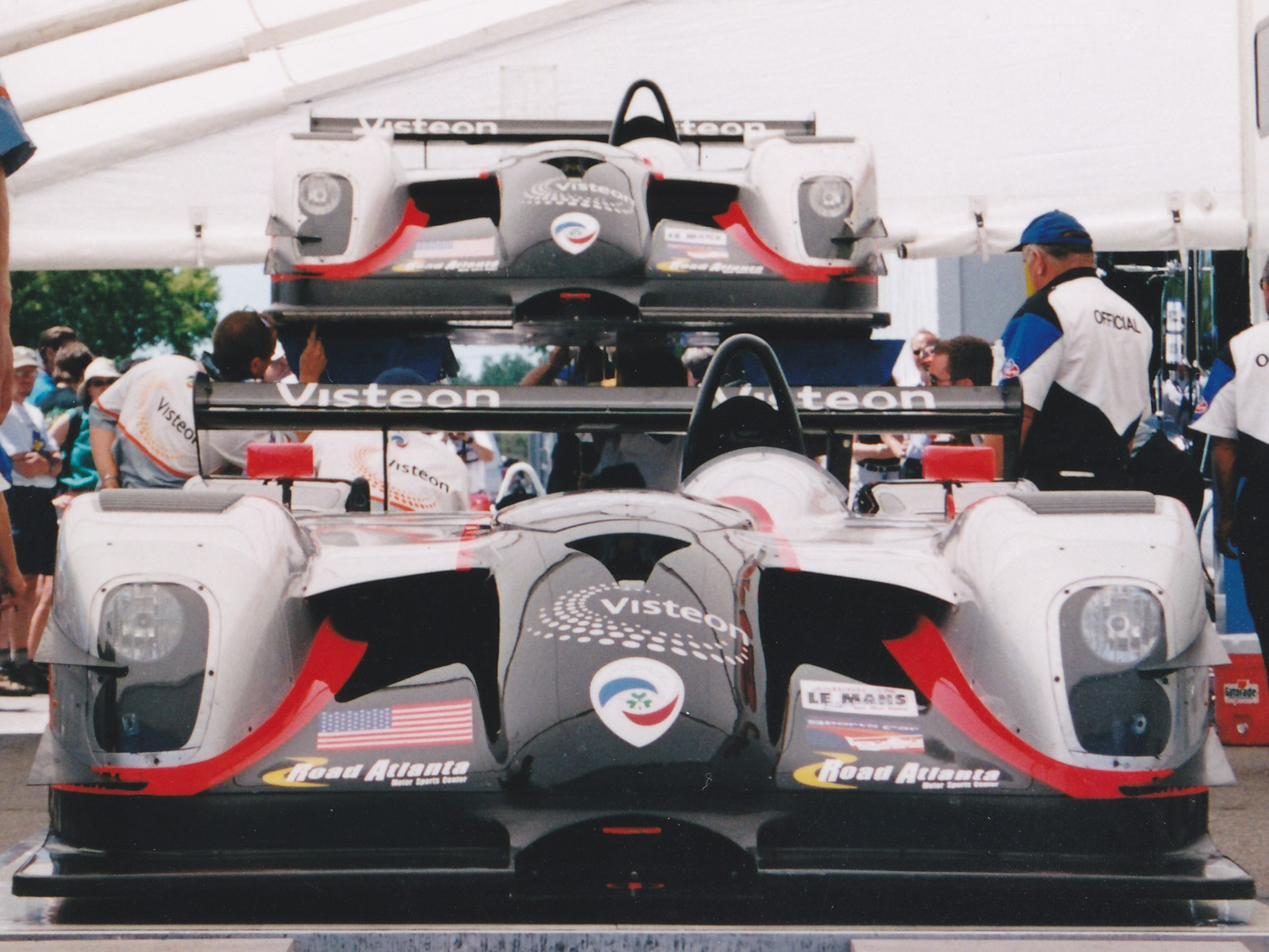
Panoz LMP-1 Roadster S - Winner 1999 Grand Prix of Mosport

After their recent victory at the 1999 24 Hours of Le Mans, the event was also set to feature the BMW V12 LMR of BMW Motorsport. After qualifying third and fourth behind the Panoz entries, the team withdrew from the race citing safety concerns at the track. Following offseason upgrades to Mosport, the team returned to the track for the 2000 edition of the race.

After back to back 24 Hours of Le Mans class victories in 1998 and 1999 and FIA GT Championships in 1997 and 1998, Dodge Viper Team Oreca debuted their Dodge Viper GTS-R in the American Le Mans Series at Mosport, taking the GTS class victory with drivers Olivier Beretta and David Donohue.

Alex Job Racing took the GT class win with drivers Cort Wagner and Dirk Müller in a Porsche 911 Carrera RSR.

The race was broadcast across North America on CNBC with Joel Meyers and Bill Adam calling the race.

== Official results ==
Class winners in bold.

Pos	Class	No	Team	Drivers	Chassis	Tyre	Laps	Time/Retired
Pos	Class	No	Team	Drivers	Engine	Tyre	Laps	Time/Retired
1	**LMP**	**2**	**(United States) Panoz Motor Sports**	**(United States) Johnny O'Connell (Denmark) Jan Magnussen**	**Panoz LMP-1 Roadster-S**	MI	**122**	**2:45:11.871**
1	**LMP**	**2**	**(United States) Panoz Motor Sports**	**(United States) Johnny O'Connell (Denmark) Jan Magnussen**	**Ford (Élan-Yates) 6.0 L V8**	MI	**122**	**2:45:11.871**
2	LMP	1	(United States) Panoz Motor Sports	(Australia) David Brabham (France) Éric Bernard	Panoz LMP-1 Roadster-S	MI	122	+ 15.237
2	LMP	1	(United States) Panoz Motor Sports	(Australia) David Brabham (France) Éric Bernard	Ford (Élan-Yates) 6.0 L V8	MI	122	+ 15.237
3	LMP	0	(Italy) Team Rafanelli SRL	(France) Érik Comas (Italy) Mimmo Schiattarella	Riley & Scott Mk III	Y	122	+ 0 Laps
3	LMP	0	(Italy) Team Rafanelli SRL	(France) Érik Comas (Italy) Mimmo Schiattarella	Judd GV4 4.0 L V10	Y	122	+ 0 Laps
4	LMP	20	(United States) Dyson Racing	(United States) Butch Leitzinger (United States) Elliott Forbes-Robinson	Riley & Scott Mk III	G	121	+ 1 Lap
4	LMP	20	(United States) Dyson Racing	(United States) Butch Leitzinger (United States) Elliott Forbes-Robinson	Ford 5.0 L V8	G	121	+ 1 Lap
5	LMP	11	(United States) Doyle-Risi Racing	(Italy) Max Angelelli (Belgium) Didier de Radiguès	Ferrari 333 SP	P	120	+ Laps
5	LMP	11	(United States) Doyle-Risi Racing	(Italy) Max Angelelli (Belgium) Didier de Radiguès	Ferrari F310E 4.0 L V12	P	120	+ Laps
6	LMP	38	(United States) Champion Racing	(United Kingdom) Allan McNish (Germany) Ralf Kelleners	Porsche 911 GT1 Evo	MI	119	+ 3 Laps
6	LMP	38	(United States) Champion Racing	(United Kingdom) Allan McNish (Germany) Ralf Kelleners	Porsche 3.2 L Turbo Flat-6	MI	119	+ 3 Laps
7	LMP	12	(United States) Doyle-Risi Racing	(Italy) Alex Caffi (South Africa) Wayne Taylor	Ferrari 333 SP	P	118	+ 4 Laps
7	LMP	12	(United States) Doyle-Risi Racing	(Italy) Alex Caffi (South Africa) Wayne Taylor	Ferrari F310E 4.0 L V12	P	118	+ 4 Laps
8	LMP	27	(United States) Doran Enterprises	(Belgium) Didier Theys (Switzerland) Fredy Lienhard	Ferrari 333 SP	MI	117	+ 5 Laps
8	LMP	27	(United States) Doran Enterprises	(Belgium) Didier Theys (Switzerland) Fredy Lienhard	Ferrari F310E 4.0 L V12	MI	117	+ 5 Laps
9	LMP	06	(Canada) Multimatic Motorsports	(Canada) Scott Maxwell (Canada) Ken Wilden	Lola B98/10	P	116	+ 6 Laps
9	LMP	06	(Canada) Multimatic Motorsports	(Canada) Scott Maxwell (Canada) Ken Wilden	Ford 5.1 L V8	P	116	+ 6 Laps
10	LMP	15	(United States) Hybrid R&D	(United States) Chris Bingham (Canada) Ross Bentley	Riley & Scott Mk III	Y	115	+ 7 Laps
10	LMP	15	(United States) Hybrid R&D	(United States) Chris Bingham (Canada) Ross Bentley	Ford 5.0 L V8	Y	115	+ 7 Laps
11	**GTS**	**91**	**(France) Dodge Viper Team Oreca**	**(Monaco) Olivier Beretta (United States) David Donohue**	**Dodge Viper GTS-R**	MI	**111**	**+ 11 Laps**
11	**GTS**	**91**	**(France) Dodge Viper Team Oreca**	**(Monaco) Olivier Beretta (United States) David Donohue**	**Dodge 8.0 L V10**	MI	**111**	**+ 11 Laps**
12	GTS	92	(France) Dodge Viper Team Oreca	(Austria) Karl Wendlinger (United States) Tommy Archer	Dodge Viper GTS-R	MI	111	+ 11 Laps
12	GTS	92	(France) Dodge Viper Team Oreca	(Austria) Karl Wendlinger (United States) Tommy Archer	Dodge 8.0 L V10	MI	111	+ 11 Laps
13	LMP	63	(United States) Downing Atlanta	(United States) Jim Downing (United States) A.J. Smith	Kudzu DLY	G	110	+ 12 Laps
13	LMP	63	(United States) Downing Atlanta	(United States) Jim Downing (United States) A.J. Smith	Mazda R26B 2.6 L 4-Rotor	G	110	+ 12 Laps
14	GTS	55	(United States) Saleen/Allen Speedlab	(United States) Terry Borcheller (United States) Ron Johnson	Saleen Mustang SR	P	109	+13 Laps
14	GTS	55	(United States) Saleen/Allen Speedlab	(United States) Terry Borcheller (United States) Ron Johnson	Ford 8.0 L V8	P	109	+13 Laps
15	LMP	28	(United States) Intersport Racing	(United States) Jon Field (Canada) Martin Guimont	Lola B98/10	G	108	+ 14 Laps
15	LMP	28	(United States) Intersport Racing	(United States) Jon Field (Canada) Martin Guimont	Ford (Roush) 6.0 L V8	G	108	+ 14 Laps
16	**GT**	**23**	**(United States) Alex Job Racing**	**(United States) Cort Wagner (Germany) Dirk Müller**	**Porsche 911 Carrera RSR**	Y	**108**	**+ 14 Laps**
16	**GT**	**23**	**(United States) Alex Job Racing**	**(United States) Cort Wagner (Germany) Dirk Müller**	**Porsche 3.8 L Flat-6**	Y	**108**	**+ 14 Laps**
17	GT	10	(United States) Prototype Technology Group	(Germany) Christian Menzel (Germany) Hans-Joachim Stuck	BMW M3	Y	106	+ 16 Laps
17	GT	10	(United States) Prototype Technology Group	(Germany) Christian Menzel (Germany) Hans-Joachim Stuck	BMW 3.2 L I6	Y	106	+ 16 Laps
18	GTS	99	(United States) Schumacher Racing	(United States) Larry Schumacher (United States) John O'Steen	Porsche 911 GT2	MI	106	+ 16 Laps
18	GTS	99	(United States) Schumacher Racing	(United States) Larry Schumacher (United States) John O'Steen	Porsche 3.6 L Turbo Flat-6	MI	106	+ 16 Laps
19	GT	7	(United States) Prototype Technology Group	(United States) Brian Cunningham (United States) Johannes van Overbeek	BMW M3	Y	105	+ 17 Laps
19	GT	7	(United States) Prototype Technology Group	(United States) Brian Cunningham (United States) Johannes van Overbeek	BMW 3.2 L I6	Y	105	+ 17 Laps
20	GTS	04	(United States) CJ Motorsport	(Canada) John Graham (United States) John Morton	Porsche 911 GT2	Y	100	+ 22 Laps
20	GTS	04	(United States) CJ Motorsport	(Canada) John Graham (United States) John Morton	Porsche 3.6 L Turbo Flat-6	Y	100	+ 22 Laps
21	GT	40	(United States) Team PRC	(United States) Scott Peeler (United States) Geoff Auberlen	Porsche 911 GT3 Cup	G	100	+ 22 Laps
21	GT	40	(United States) Team PRC	(United States) Scott Peeler (United States) Geoff Auberlen	Porsche 3.6 L Flat-6	G	100	+ 22 Laps
22	GT	03	(United States) Reiser Callas Rennsport	(United States) Grady Willingham (United States) Joel Reiser	Porsche 911 Carrera RSR	P	99	+ 23 Laps
22	GT	03	(United States) Reiser Callas Rennsport	(United States) Grady Willingham (United States) Joel Reiser	Porsche 3.8 L Flat-6	P	99	+ 23 Laps
23	GT	22	(United States) Alex Job Racing	(United States) Mike Fitzgerald (United States) Darryl Havens	Porsche 911 Carrera RSR	Y	99	+ 23 Laps
23	GT	22	(United States) Alex Job Racing	(United States) Mike Fitzgerald (United States) Darryl Havens	Porsche 3.8 L Flat-6	Y	99	+ 23 Laps
24	GT	02	(United States) Reiser Callas Rennsport	(United Kingdom) Johnny Mowlem (United States) Craig Stanton	Porsche 911 Carrera RSR	P	98	+ 24 Laps
24	GT	02	(United States) Reiser Callas Rennsport	(United Kingdom) Johnny Mowlem (United States) Craig Stanton	Porsche 3.8 L Flat-6	P	98	+ 24 Laps
25 DNF	LMP	75	(France) DAMS	(France) Jean-Marc Gounon (France) Christophe Tinseau	Lola B98/10	P	97	overheating
25 DNF	LMP	75	(France) DAMS	(France) Jean-Marc Gounon (France) Christophe Tinseau	Judd GV4 4.0 L V10	P	97	overheating
26	GTS	56	(United States) Martin Snow Racing	(United States) Martin Snow (United States) Kelly Collins	Porsche 911 GT2	MI	97	+ 25 Laps
26	GTS	56	(United States) Martin Snow Racing	(United States) Martin Snow (United States) Kelly Collins	Porsche 3.6 L Turbo Flat-6	MI	97	+ 25 Laps
27	GT	76	(United States) Team ARE	(United States) Peter Argetsinger (United States) Richard Polidori	Porsche 911 Carrera RSR	Y	92	+ 30 Laps
27	GT	76	(United States) Team ARE	(United States) Peter Argetsinger (United States) Richard Polidori	Porsche 3.8 L Flat-6	Y	92	+ 30 Laps
28 DNF	LMP	16	(United States) Dyson Racing	(United Kingdom) Andy Wallace (United Kingdom) James Weaver	Riley & Scott Mk III	G	83	cooling system
28 DNF	LMP	16	(United States) Dyson Racing	(United Kingdom) Andy Wallace (United Kingdom) James Weaver	Ford 5.0 L V8	G	83	cooling system
29	GT	6	(United States) Prototype Technology Group	(United States) Peter Cunningham (United States) Mark Simo	BMW M3	Y	81	+ 41 Laps
29	GT	6	(United States) Prototype Technology Group	(United States) Peter Cunningham (United States) Mark Simo	BMW 3.2L I6	Y	81	+ 41 Laps
30 DNF	GTS	83	(United States) Chiefie Motorsports	(United States) Andy Pilgrim (United States) Zak Brown	Porsche 911 GT2	P	72	Brakes
30 DNF	GTS	83	(United States) Chiefie Motorsports	(United States) Andy Pilgrim (United States) Zak Brown	Porsche 3.6 L Turbo Flat-6	P	72	Brakes
31 DNF	LMP	18	(United States) Dollahite Racing	(United States) Bill Dollahite (United States) Mike Davies	Ferrari 333 SP	P	61	Accident
31 DNF	LMP	18	(United States) Dollahite Racing	(United States) Bill Dollahite (United States) Mike Davies	Ferrari F310E 4.0 L V12	P	61	Accident
32 DNF	GT	17	(United States) GT Contemporary Motorsports	(United States) Mike Conte (United Kingdom) Nick Holt	Porsche 911 Carrera RSR	Y	11	wheel bearing
32 DNF	GT	17	(United States) GT Contemporary Motorsports	(United States) Mike Conte (United Kingdom) Nick Holt	Porsche 3.8 L Flat-6	Y	11	wheel bearing
33 DNF	LMP	36	(United States) Doran Enterprises (United States) Jim Matthews Racing	(United States) Anthony Lazzaro (United States) Jim Matthews	Ferrari 333 SP	MI	8	Throttle
33 DNF	LMP	36	(United States) Doran Enterprises (United States) Jim Matthews Racing	(United States) Anthony Lazzaro (United States) Jim Matthews	Ferrari F310E 4.0 L V12	MI	8	Throttle
DNS	LMP	42	(Germany) BMW Motorsport (Germany) Schnitzer Motorsport	(Finland) JJ Lehto (Germany) Jörg Müller	BMW V12 LMR	MI	-	withdrawn^{1}
DNS	LMP	42	(Germany) BMW Motorsport (Germany) Schnitzer Motorsport	(Finland) JJ Lehto (Germany) Jörg Müller	BMW S70 6.0 L V12	MI	-	withdrawn^{1}
DNS	LMP	43	(Germany) BMW Motorsport (Germany) Schnitzer Motorsport	(Germany) Joachim Winkelhock (United States) Bill Auberlen	BMW V12 LMR	MI	-	withdrawn^{1}
DNS	LMP	43	(Germany) BMW Motorsport (Germany) Schnitzer Motorsport	(Germany) Joachim Winkelhock (United States) Bill Auberlen	BMW S70 6.0 L V12	MI	-	withdrawn^{1}

=== Notes ===
^1 – The No. 42 and No. 43 BMW V12 LMR were withdrawn from the event following qualifying, because BMW deemed the track to be too dangerous to race on.

== Statistics ==
- Pole Position - #2 Panoz Motor Sports (Jan Magnussen) - 1:10.514
- Fastest Lap - #1 Panoz Motor Sports (David Brabham) - 1:12.093
- Time of race - 2:45:11.871
- Distance - 482.800 km (299.998 mi)
- Average Speed - 175.353 km/h (108.959 mph)

== Photo Gallery ==
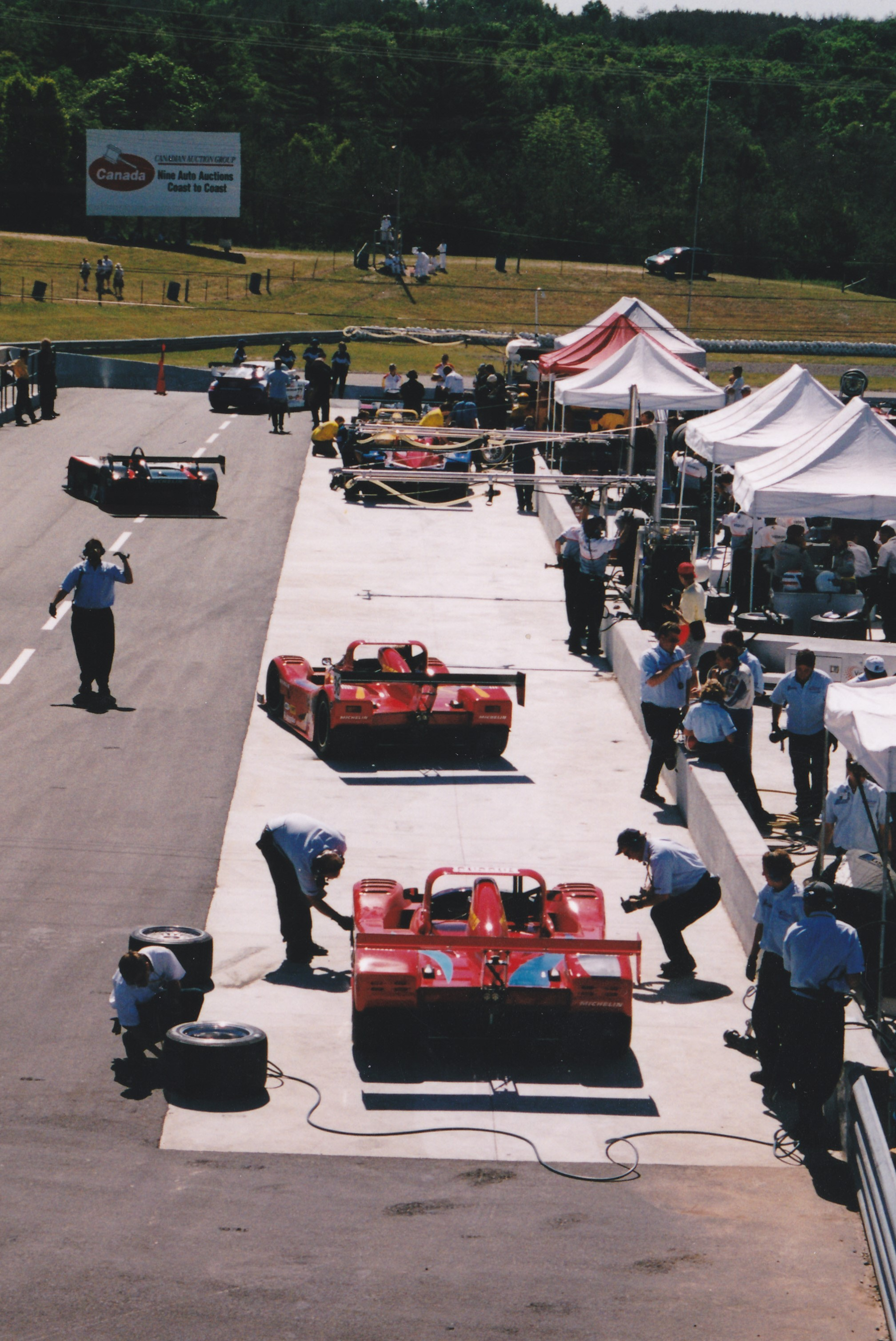
LMP Pits

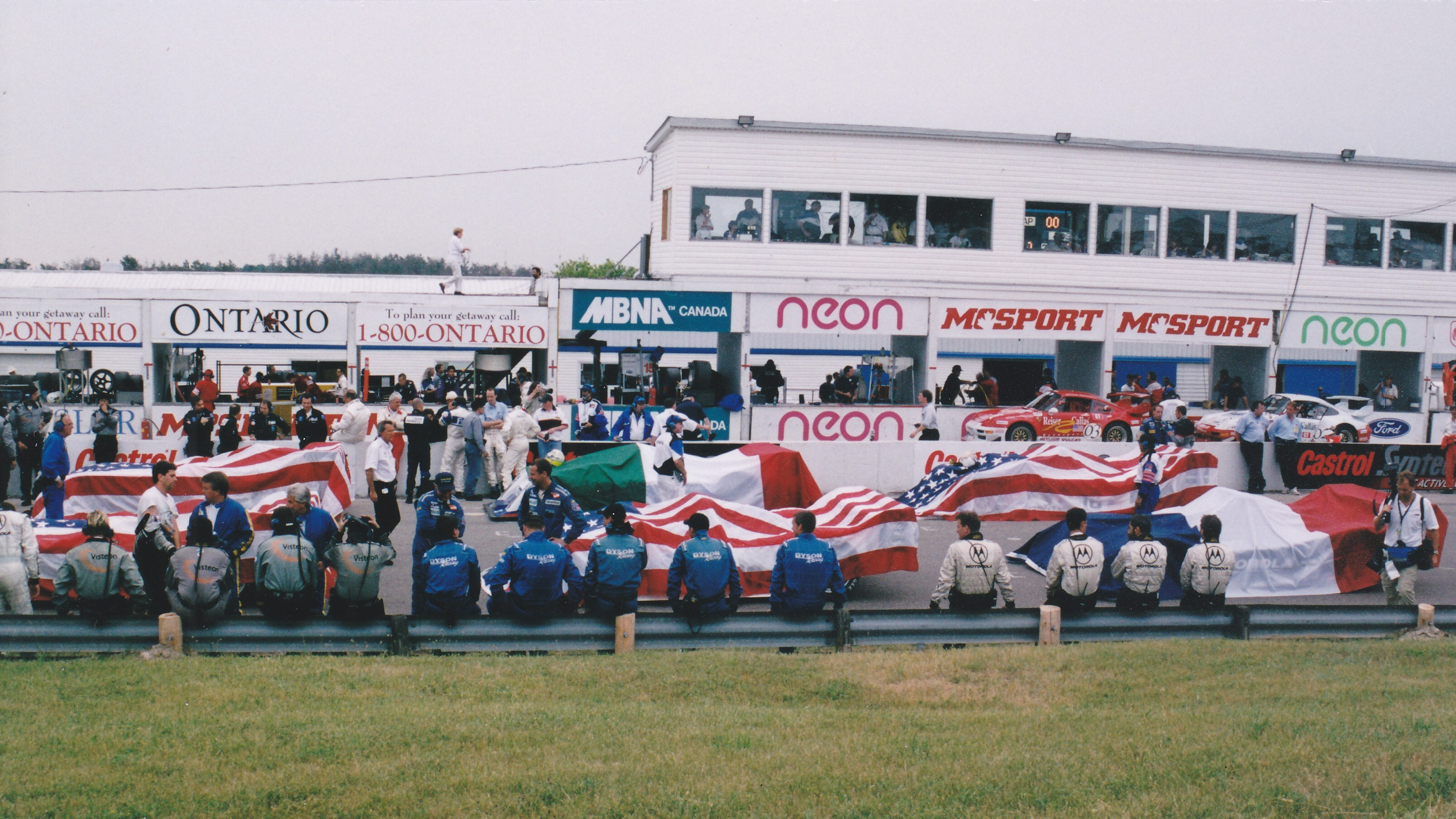
Pre-Race Grid

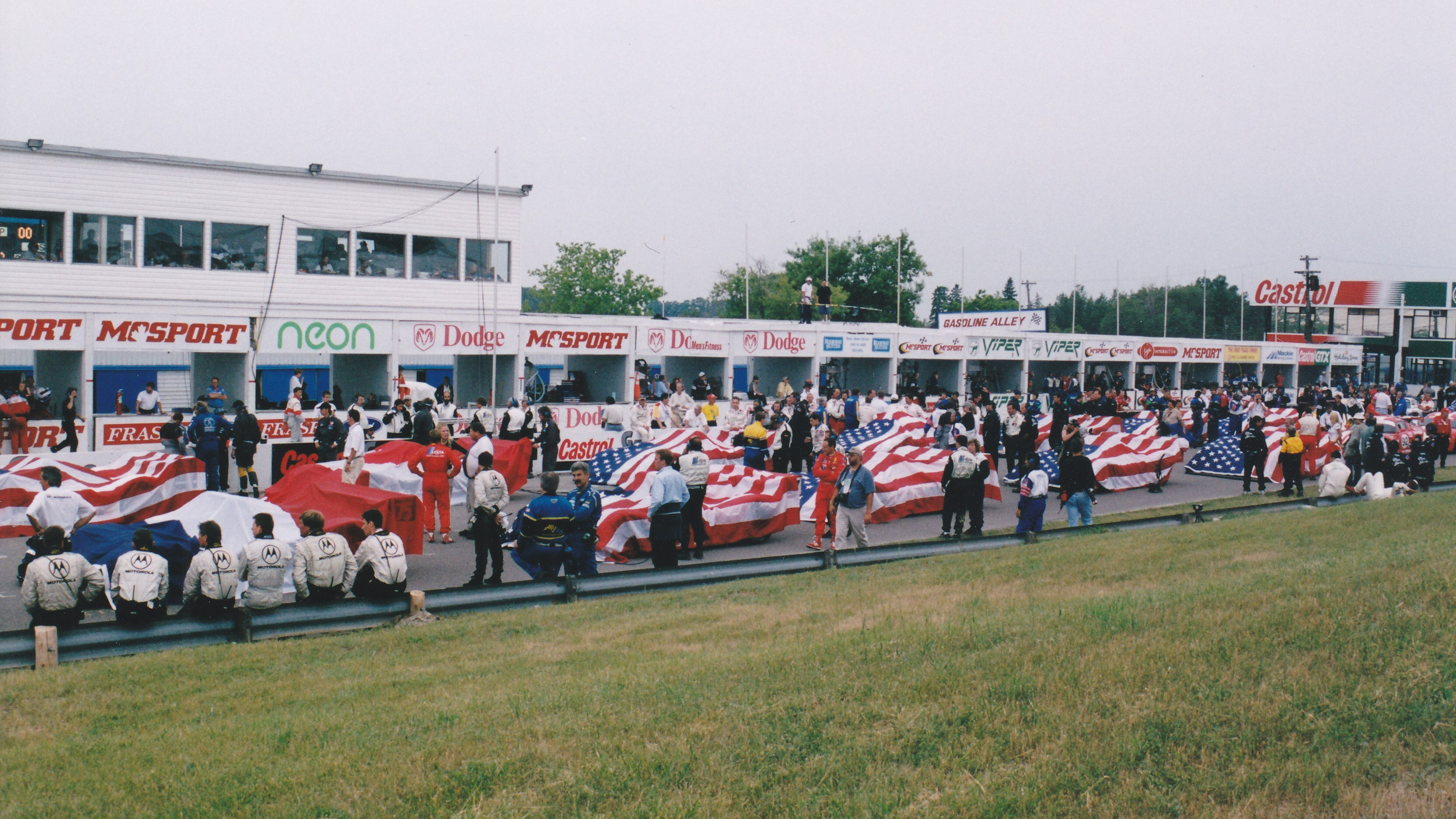
Pre-Race Grid

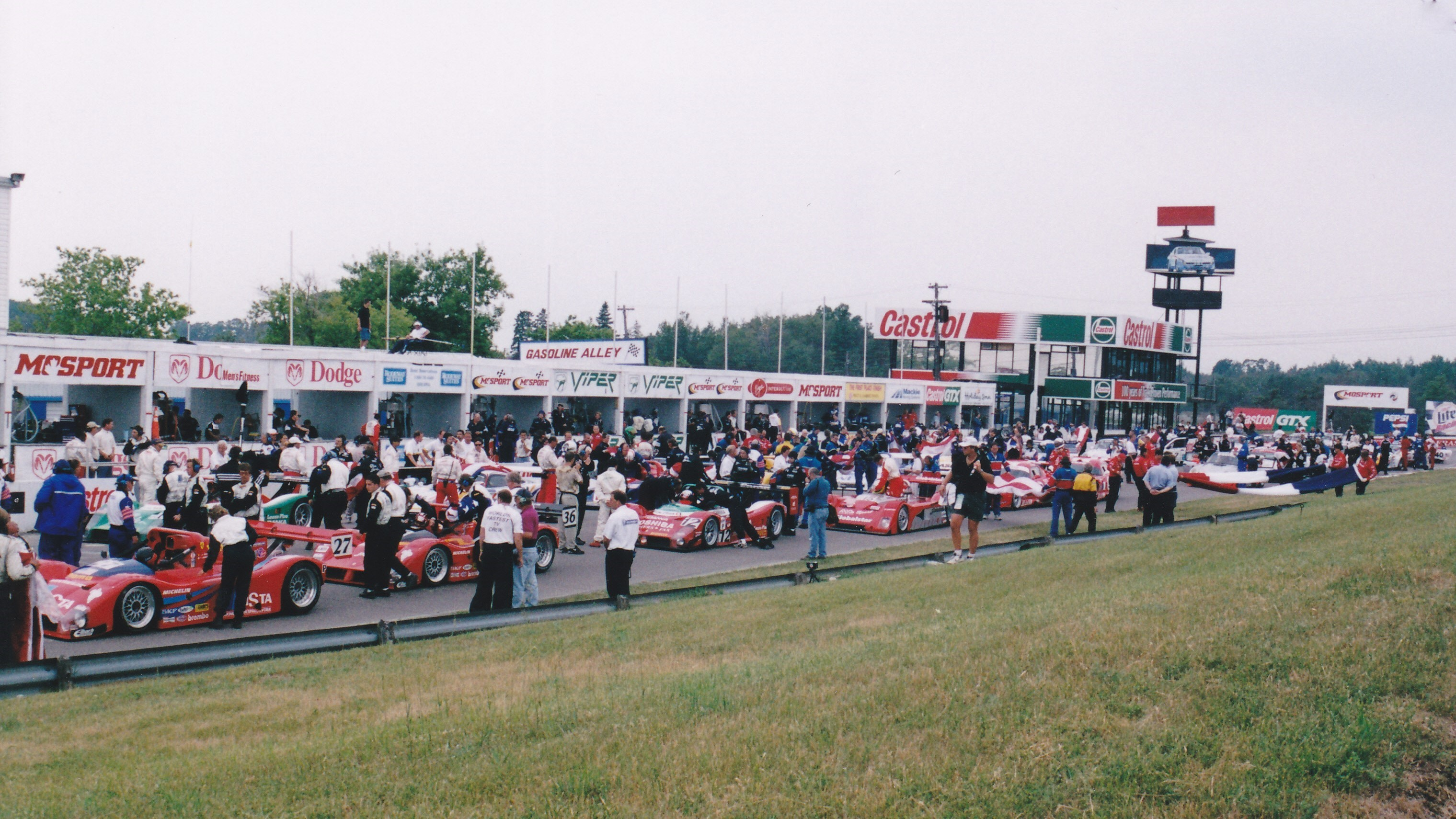
Pre-Race Grid

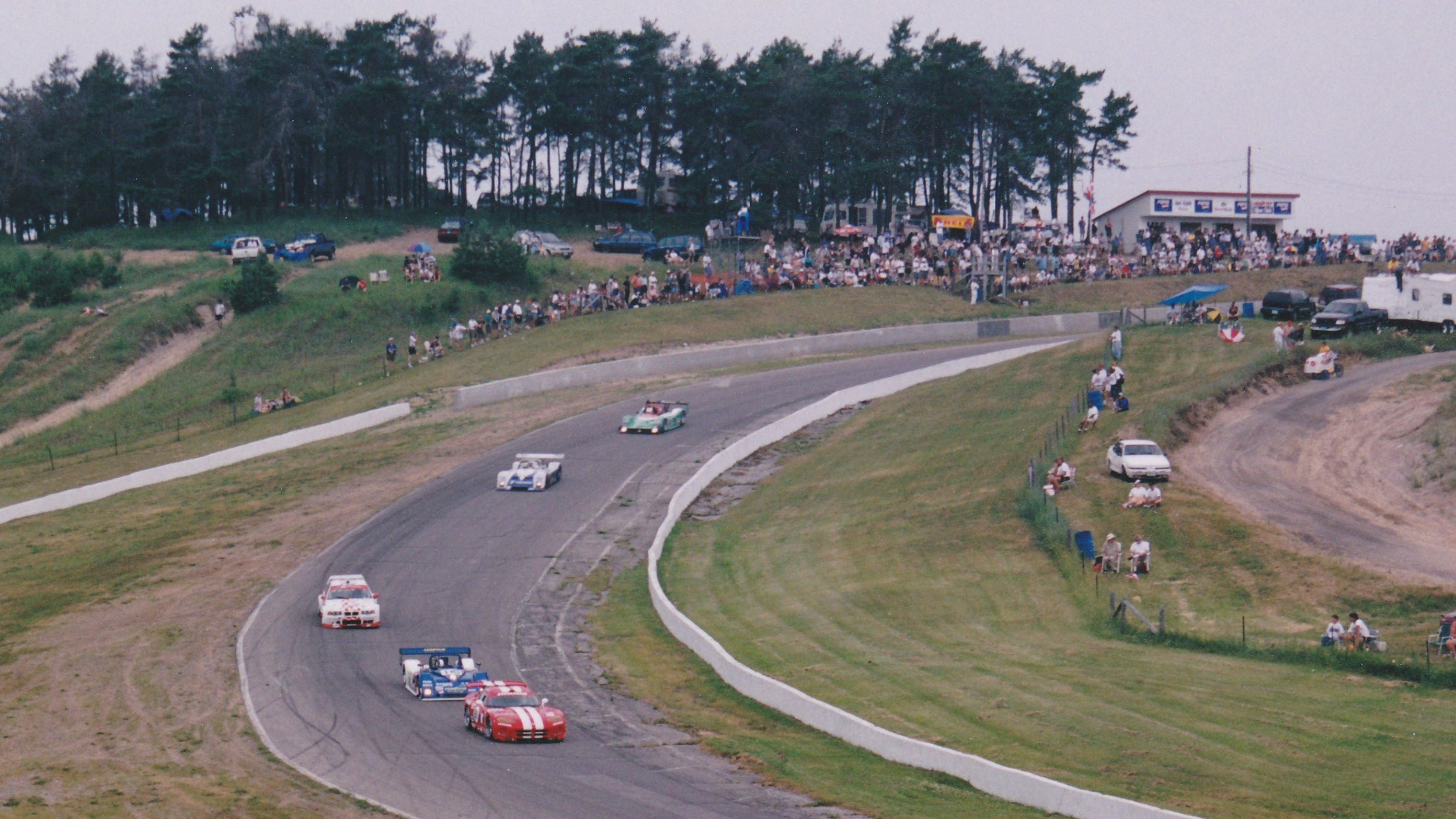
Turn 2 Race Action

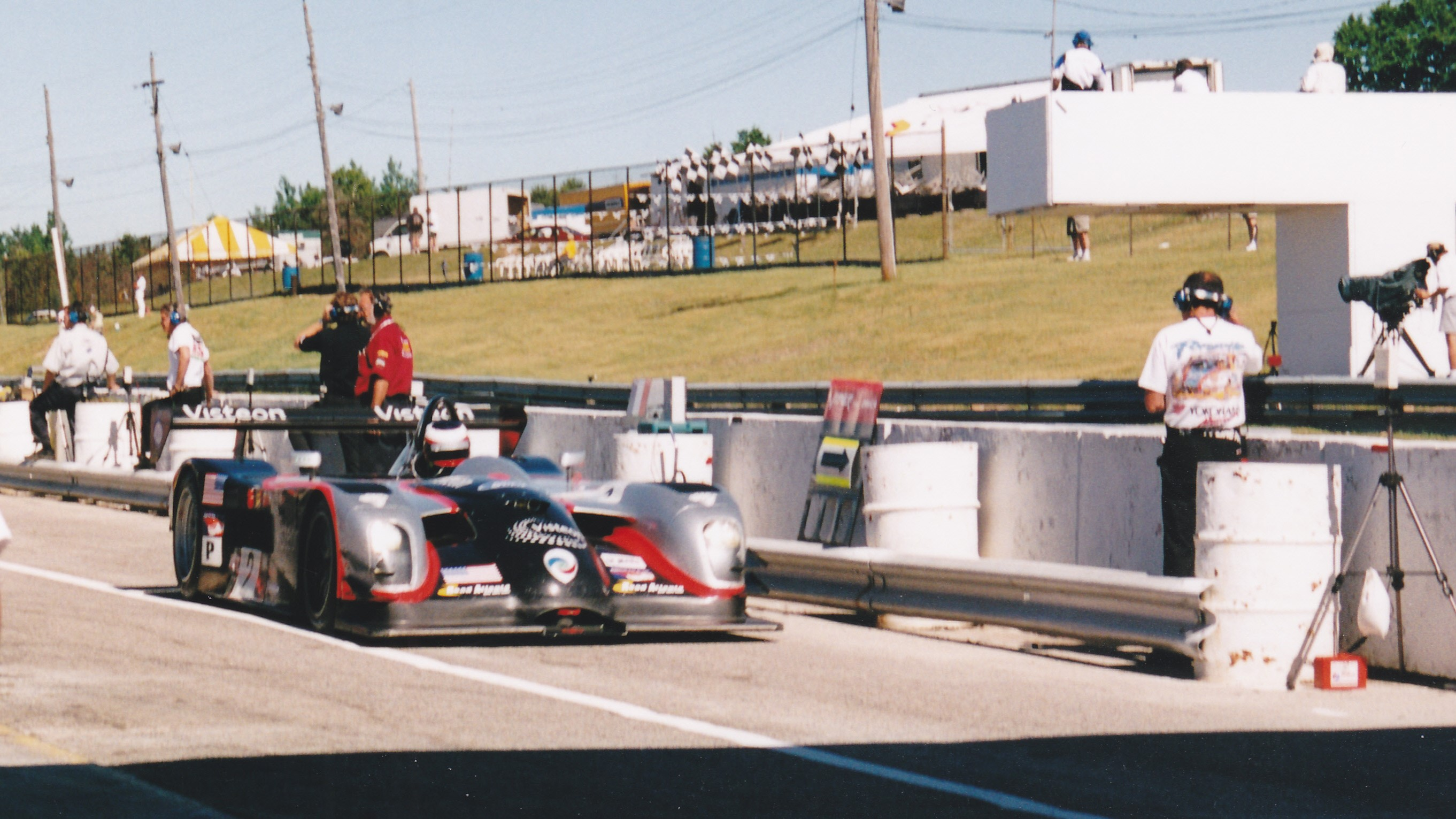
Panoz Roadster Pits

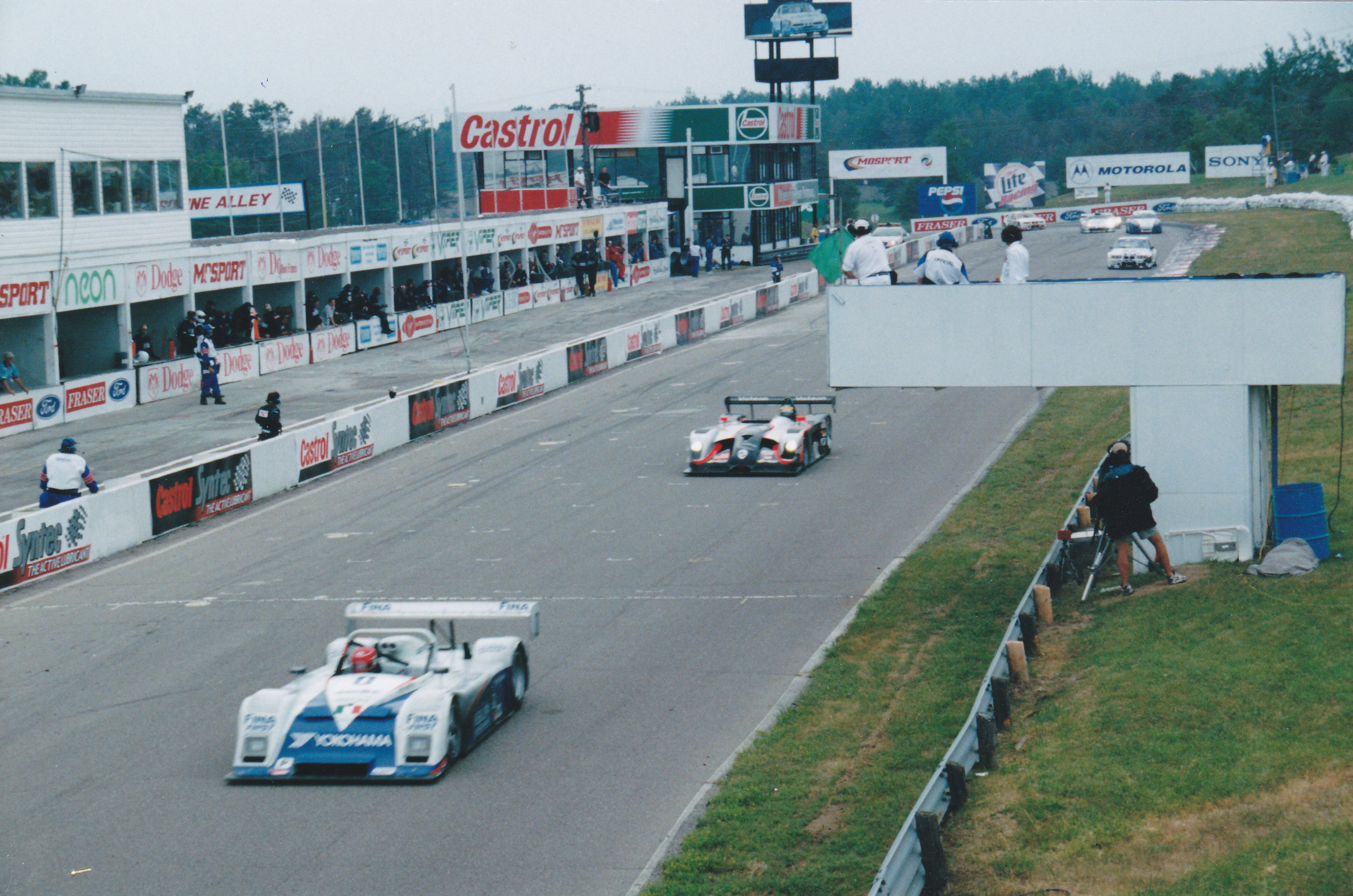
Start Finish Line Race Action

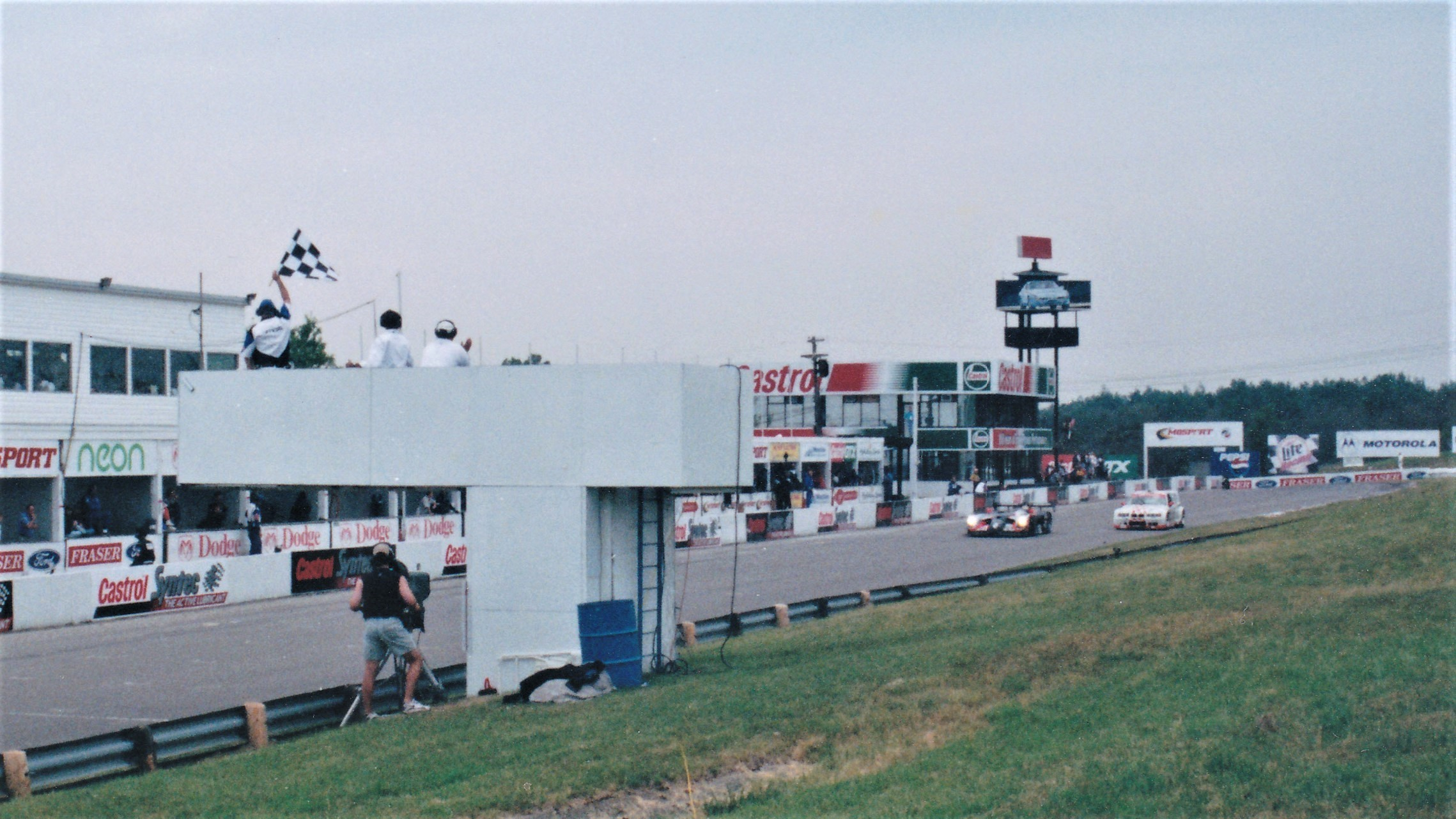
Race Finish

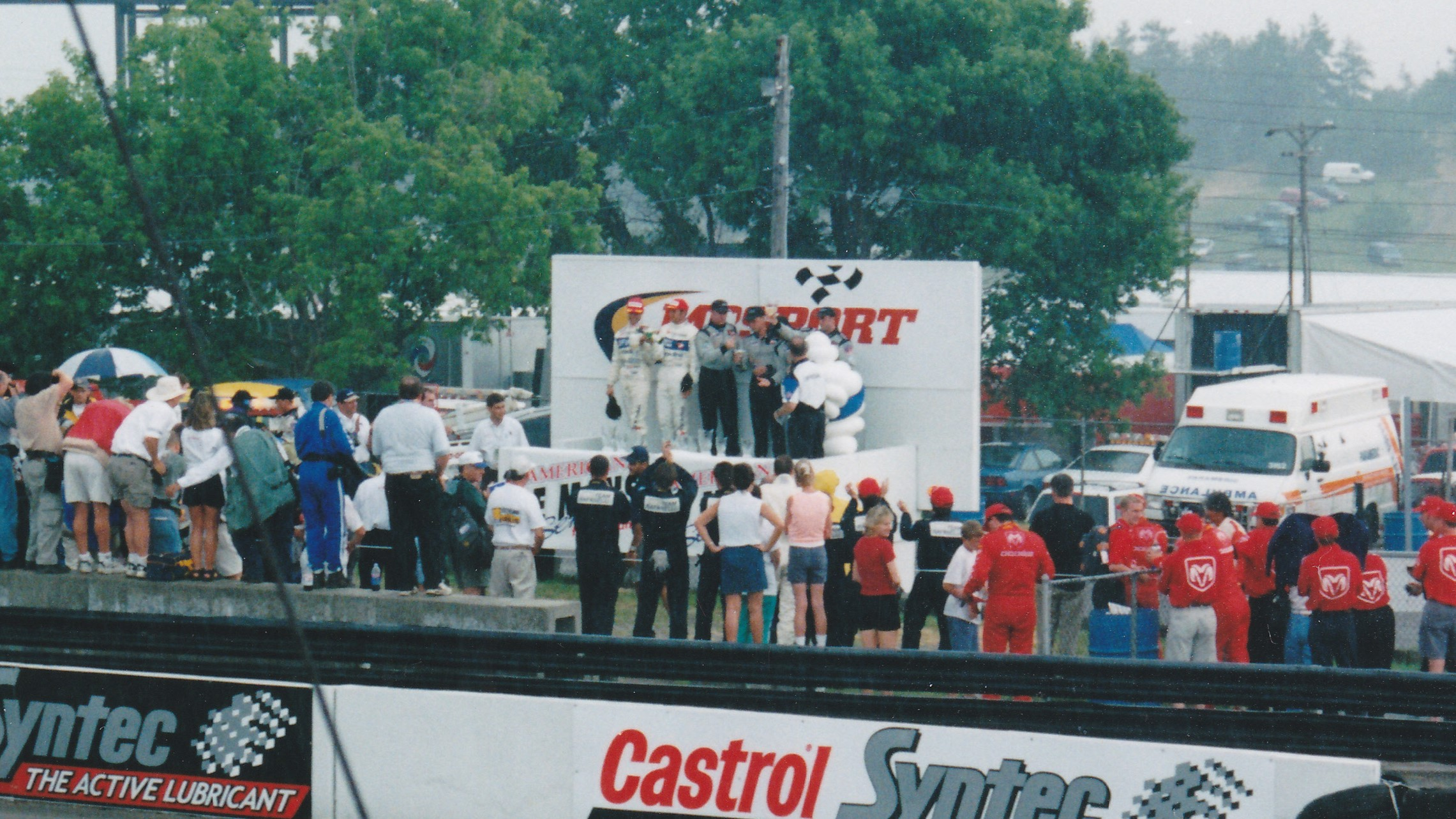
Winners Podium

American Le Mans Series
Previous race: 1999 Grand Prix of Atlanta	1999 season	Next race: 1999 Grand Prix of Sonoma
