= 1999 Grand Prix of Las Vegas =

The 1999 Grand Prix of Las Vegas was the eighth and final round of the 1999 American Le Mans Series season. It took place at Las Vegas Motor Speedway, Nevada, on November 7, 1999.

== Race results ==
Class winners in bold.

Pos	Class	No	Team	Drivers	Chassis	Tyre	Laps
Pos	Class	No	Team	Drivers	Engine	Tyre	Laps
1	**LMP**	**42**	**(Germany) BMW Motorsport (Germany) Schnitzer Motorsport**	**(Finland) JJ Lehto (United Kingdom) Steve Soper**	**BMW V12 LMR**	**MI**	**129**
1	**LMP**	**42**	**(Germany) BMW Motorsport (Germany) Schnitzer Motorsport**	**(Finland) JJ Lehto (United Kingdom) Steve Soper**	**BMW S70 6.0 L V12**	**MI**	**129**
2	LMP	43	(Germany) BMW Motorsport (Germany) Schnitzer Motorsport	(Germany) Joachim Winkelhock (United States) Bill Auberlen	BMW V12 LMR	**MI**	129
2	LMP	43	(Germany) BMW Motorsport (Germany) Schnitzer Motorsport	(Germany) Joachim Winkelhock (United States) Bill Auberlen	BMW S70 6.0 L V12	**MI**	129
3	LMP	75	(France) DAMS	(France) Jean-Marc Gounon (France) Christophe Tinseau	Lola B98/10	**P**	128
3	LMP	75	(France) DAMS	(France) Jean-Marc Gounon (France) Christophe Tinseau	Judd GV4 4.0 L V10	**P**	128
4	LMP	2	(United States) Panoz Motor Sports	(United States) Johnny O'Connell (Denmark) Jan Magnussen	Panoz LMP-1 Roadster-S	**MI**	128
4	LMP	2	(United States) Panoz Motor Sports	(United States) Johnny O'Connell (Denmark) Jan Magnussen	Ford (Élan-Yates) 6.0 L V8	**MI**	128
5	LMP	36	(United States) Doran Lista Racing (United States) Jim Matthews Racing	(Sweden) Stefan Johansson (United States) Jim Matthews	Ferrari 333 SP	**MI**	127
5	LMP	36	(United States) Doran Lista Racing (United States) Jim Matthews Racing	(Sweden) Stefan Johansson (United States) Jim Matthews	Ferrari F310E 4.0 L V12	**MI**	127
6	LMP	16	(United States) Dyson Racing	(United States) Elliott Forbes-Robinson (United Kingdom) James Weaver	Riley & Scott Mk III	**G**	126
6	LMP	16	(United States) Dyson Racing	(United States) Elliott Forbes-Robinson (United Kingdom) James Weaver	Ford 5.0 L V8	**G**	126
7	LMP	12	(United States) Doyle-Risi Racing	(Italy) Alex Caffi (South Africa) Wayne Taylor	Ferrari 333 SP	**P**	125
7	LMP	12	(United States) Doyle-Risi Racing	(Italy) Alex Caffi (South Africa) Wayne Taylor	Ferrari F310E 4.0 L V12	**P**	125
8	LMP	11	(United States) Doyle-Risi Racing	(Italy) Max Angelelli (Belgium) Didier de Radiguès	Ferrari 333 SP	**P**	125
8	LMP	11	(United States) Doyle-Risi Racing	(Italy) Max Angelelli (Belgium) Didier de Radiguès	Ferrari F310E 4.0 L V12	**P**	125
9	**GTS**	**92**	**(France) Dodge Viper Team Oreca**	**(Austria) Karl Wendlinger (United States) Tommy Archer**	**Dodge Viper GTS-R**	**MI**	**120**
9	**GTS**	**92**	**(France) Dodge Viper Team Oreca**	**(Austria) Karl Wendlinger (United States) Tommy Archer**	**Dodge 8.0 L V10**	**MI**	**120**
10	LMP	15	(United States) Hybrid R&D	(United States) Chris Bingham (United States) Rick Sutherland (United States) Dave Cutler	Riley & Scott Mk III	**Y**	120
10	LMP	15	(United States) Hybrid R&D	(United States) Chris Bingham (United States) Rick Sutherland (United States) Dave Cutler	Ford 5.0 L V8	**Y**	120
11	GTS	91	(France) Dodge Viper Team Oreca	(Monaco) Olivier Beretta (United States) David Donohue	Dodge Viper GTS-R	**MI**	120
11	GTS	91	(France) Dodge Viper Team Oreca	(Monaco) Olivier Beretta (United States) David Donohue	Dodge 8.0 L V10	**MI**	120
12	GTS	3	(United States) Corvette Racing	(United States) Chris Kneifel (Canada) Ron Fellows	Chevrolet Corvette C5-R	**G**	118
12	GTS	3	(United States) Corvette Racing	(United States) Chris Kneifel (Canada) Ron Fellows	Chevrolet 7.0 L V8	**G**	118
13	**GT**	**23**	**(Germany) Manthey Racing (United States) Alex Job Racing**	**(Germany) Dirk Müller (United States) Cort Wagner**	**Porsche 911 GT3-R**	**MI**	**117**
13	**GT**	**23**	**(Germany) Manthey Racing (United States) Alex Job Racing**	**(Germany) Dirk Müller (United States) Cort Wagner**	**Porsche 3.6 L Flat-6**	**MI**	**117**
14	GTS	08	(United States) Roock Motorsport North America	(Germany) Claudia Hürtgen (Germany) André Ahrlé	Porsche 911 GT2	**Y**	117
14	GTS	08	(United States) Roock Motorsport North America	(Germany) Claudia Hürtgen (Germany) André Ahrlé	Porsche 3.8 L Turbo Flat-6	**Y**	117
15	GT	7	(United States) Prototype Technology Group	(United States) Peter Cunningham (United States) Brian Cunningham	BMW M3	**Y**	115
15	GT	7	(United States) Prototype Technology Group	(United States) Peter Cunningham (United States) Brian Cunningham	BMW 3.2 L I6	**Y**	115
16	GT	17	(United States) Contemporary Motorsports	(United States) Mike Conte (United States) Randy Pobst	Porsche 911 Carrera RSR	?	114
16	GT	17	(United States) Contemporary Motorsports	(United States) Mike Conte (United States) Randy Pobst	Porsche 3.8 L Flat-6	?	114
17	GT	6	(United States) Prototype Technology Group	(United States) Johannes van Overbeek (Germany) Hans-Joachim Stuck	BMW M3	**Y**	114
17	GT	6	(United States) Prototype Technology Group	(United States) Johannes van Overbeek (Germany) Hans-Joachim Stuck	BMW 3.2 L I6	**Y**	114
18	GT	10	(United States) Prototype Technology Group	(United States) Boris Said (United States) Mark Simo	BMW M3	**Y**	114
18	GT	10	(United States) Prototype Technology Group	(United States) Boris Said (United States) Mark Simo	BMW 3.2 L I6	**Y**	114
19	GTS	61	(Germany) Konrad Motorsport	(Austria) Franz Konrad (United States) Charles Slater (Italy) Simon Sobrero	Porsche 911 GT2	**D**	113
19	GTS	61	(Germany) Konrad Motorsport	(Austria) Franz Konrad (United States) Charles Slater (Italy) Simon Sobrero	Porsche 3.6 L Turbo Flat-6	**D**	113
20 DNF	LMP	1	(United States) Panoz Motor Sports	(Australia) David Brabham (France) Éric Bernard	Panoz LMP-1 Roadster-S	**MI**	112
20 DNF	LMP	1	(United States) Panoz Motor Sports	(Australia) David Brabham (France) Éric Bernard	Ford (Élan-Yates) 6.0 L V8	**MI**	112
21	GTS	55	(United States) Saleen/Allen Speedlab	(United States) Terry Borcheller (United States) Ron Johnson	Saleen Mustang SR	**P**	112
21	GTS	55	(United States) Saleen/Allen Speedlab	(United States) Terry Borcheller (United States) Ron Johnson	Ford 8.0 L V8	**P**	112
22	GT	22	(United States) Alex Job Racing	(United States) Mike Fitzgerald (United States) Darryl Havens	Porsche 911 Carrera RSR	**Y**	111
22	GT	22	(United States) Alex Job Racing	(United States) Mike Fitzgerald (United States) Darryl Havens	Porsche 3.8 L Flat-6	**Y**	111
23	GT	48	(Germany) Freisinger Motorsport	(United States) Kevin Buckler (United States) Philip Collin	Porsche 911 Supercup	?	108
23	GT	48	(Germany) Freisinger Motorsport	(United States) Kevin Buckler (United States) Philip Collin	Porsche 3.6 L Flat-6	?	108
24	GT	81	(United States) Fordahl Motorsports	(United States) Steve Valentinetti (United States) Kimberly Hiskey (United States) John Hill	Porsche 911 Carrera RSR	?	104
24	GT	81	(United States) Fordahl Motorsports	(United States) Steve Valentinetti (United States) Kimberly Hiskey (United States) John Hill	Porsche 3.8 L Flat-6	?	104
25 DNF	GTS	56	(United States) Martin Snow Racing	(United States) Martin Snow (United States) Kelly Collins	Porsche 911 GT2	**MI**	101
25 DNF	GTS	56	(United States) Martin Snow Racing	(United States) Martin Snow (United States) Kelly Collins	Porsche 3.6 L Turbo Flat-6	**MI**	101
26 DNF	GT	53	(United States) White Lightning Racing	(United States) Dale White (United States) Wade Gaughran	Porsche 911 Carrera RSR	?	101
26 DNF	GT	53	(United States) White Lightning Racing	(United States) Dale White (United States) Wade Gaughran	Porsche 3.8 L Flat-6	?	101
27 DNF	GT	25	(Germany) RWS Motorsport	(Austria) Hans-Jörg Hofer (Italy) Luca Riccitelli	Porsche 911 GT3-R	**MI**	97
27 DNF	GT	25	(Germany) RWS Motorsport	(Austria) Hans-Jörg Hofer (Italy) Luca Riccitelli	Porsche 3.6 L Flat-6	**MI**	97
28	GT	03	(United States) Reiser Callas Rennsport	(United States) Grady Willingham (United States) Joel Reiser (United States) Craig Stanton	Porsche 911 Carrera RSR	**P**	97
28	GT	03	(United States) Reiser Callas Rennsport	(United States) Grady Willingham (United States) Joel Reiser (United States) Craig Stanton	Porsche 3.8 L Flat-6	**P**	97
29	GT	76	(United States) Team ARE	(United States) Scott Peeler (United States) Mike Doolin	Porsche 911 Carrera RSR	**Y**	96
29	GT	76	(United States) Team ARE	(United States) Scott Peeler (United States) Mike Doolin	Porsche 3.8 L Flat-6	**Y**	96
30 DNF	LMP	29	(United States) Intersport Racing	(United States) Spencer Trenery (United States) Paul Debban	Riley & Scott Mk III	**G**	84
30 DNF	LMP	29	(United States) Intersport Racing	(United States) Spencer Trenery (United States) Paul Debban	Ford (Roush) 6.0 L V8	**G**	84
31 DNF	GTS	83	(United States) Chiefie Motorsports	(United States) Zak Brown (Italy) Stefano Buttiero	Porsche 911 GT2	?	52
31 DNF	GTS	83	(United States) Chiefie Motorsports	(United States) Zak Brown (Italy) Stefano Buttiero	Porsche 3.6 L Turbo Flat-6	?	52
32 DNF	LMP	27	(United States) Doran Lista Racing	(Belgium) Didier Theys (Italy) Mauro Baldi	Ferrari 333 SP	**MI**	47
32 DNF	LMP	27	(United States) Doran Lista Racing	(Belgium) Didier Theys (Italy) Mauro Baldi	Ferrari F310E 4.0 L V12	**MI**	47
33 DNF	LMP	28	(United States) Intersport Racing	(United States) Jon Field (Sweden) Niclas Jönsson	Lola B98/10	**G**	35
33 DNF	LMP	28	(United States) Intersport Racing	(United States) Jon Field (Sweden) Niclas Jönsson	Ford (Roush) 6.0 L V8	**G**	35
34 DNF	GT	02	(United States) Reiser Callas Rennsport	(United Kingdom) Johnny Mowlem (United States) David Murry	Porsche 911 Carrera RSR	**P**	35
34 DNF	GT	02	(United States) Reiser Callas Rennsport	(United Kingdom) Johnny Mowlem (United States) David Murry	Porsche 3.8 L Flat-6	**P**	35
35 DNF	LMP	20	(United States) Dyson Racing	(United States) Butch Leitzinger (United Kingdom) Andy Wallace	Riley & Scott Mk III	**G**	22
35 DNF	LMP	20	(United States) Dyson Racing	(United States) Butch Leitzinger (United Kingdom) Andy Wallace	Ford 5.0 L V8	**G**	22
36 DNF	LMP	38	(United States) Champion Racing	(United Kingdom) Allan McNish (Germany) Ralf Kelleners	Porsche 911 GT1 Evo	**MI**	19
36 DNF	LMP	38	(United States) Champion Racing	(United Kingdom) Allan McNish (Germany) Ralf Kelleners	Porsche 3.2 L Turbo Flat-6	**MI**	19
37 DNF	LMP	0	(Italy) Team Rafanelli SRL	(Belgium) Eric van de Poele (Italy) Mimmo Schiattarella	Riley & Scott Mk III	**Y**	14
37 DNF	LMP	0	(Italy) Team Rafanelli SRL	(Belgium) Eric van de Poele (Italy) Mimmo Schiattarella	Judd GV4 4.0 L V10	**Y**	14

== Statistics ==
- Pole Position - #1 Panoz Motor Sports (David Brabham) - 1:07.404
- Fastest Lap - #1 Panoz Motor Sports (Éric Bernard) - 1:09.210
- Distance - 467.112 km (290.250 mi)
- Average Speed - 169.411 km/h (105.267 mph)

American Le Mans Series
Previous race: 1999 Monterey Sports Car Championships	1999 season	Next race: None
