= 2000 Grand Prix of Sonoma =

Le Mans Series motor race

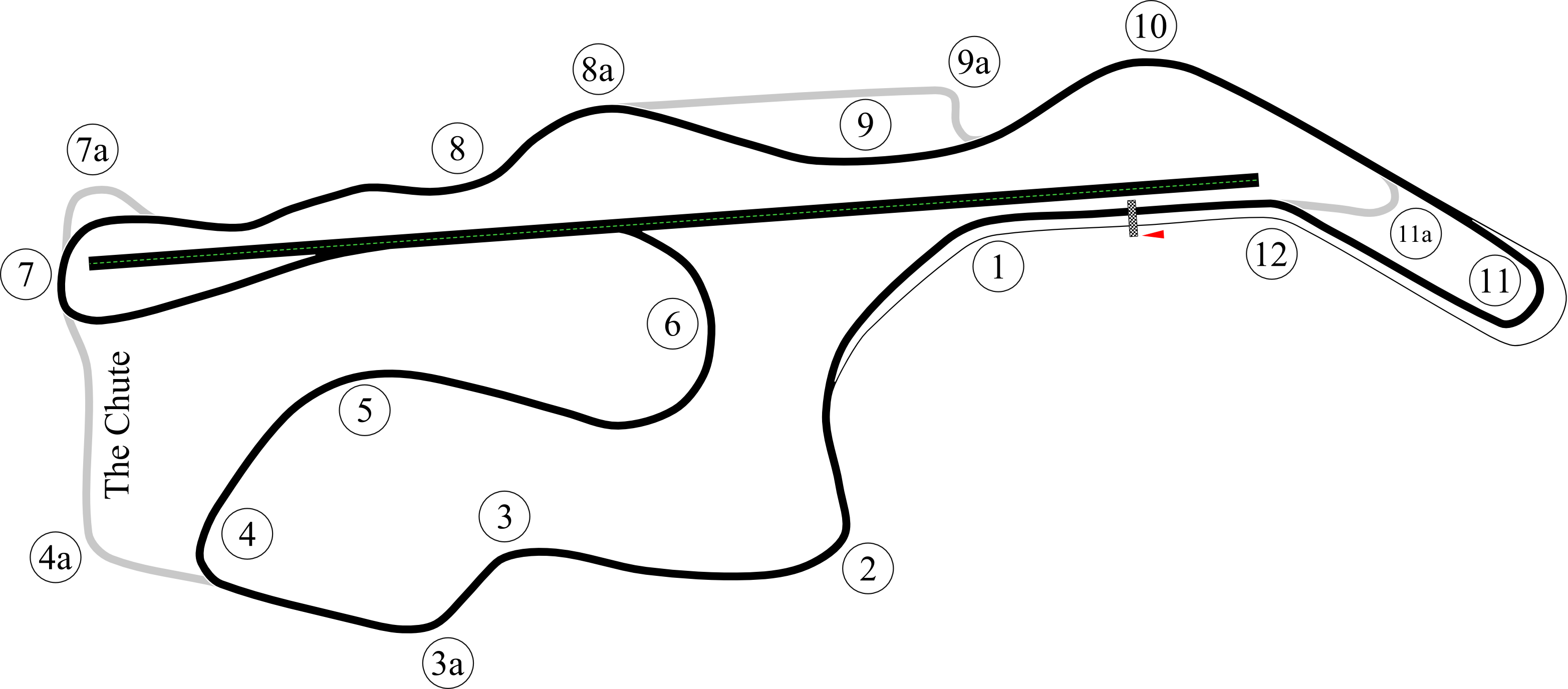
Sonoma Raceway

The 2000 Grand Prix of Sonoma was the fifth round of the 2000 American Le Mans Series season. It took place at the 4.032 km version of Sonoma Raceway, California, on July 23, 2000.

== Race results ==
Class winners in bold.

Pos	Class	No	Team	Drivers	Chassis	Tyre	Laps
Pos	Class	No	Team	Drivers	Engine	Tyre	Laps
1	**LMP**	**77**	**(Germany) Audi Sport North America**	**(Italy) Rinaldo Capello (United Kingdom) Allan McNish**	**Audi R8**	M	**114**
1	**LMP**	**77**	**(Germany) Audi Sport North America**	**(Italy) Rinaldo Capello (United Kingdom) Allan McNish**	**Audi 3.6 L Turbo V8**	M	**114**
2	LMP	78	(Germany) Audi Sport North America	(Germany) Frank Biela (Italy) Emanuele Pirro	Audi R8	M	113
2	LMP	78	(Germany) Audi Sport North America	(Germany) Frank Biela (Italy) Emanuele Pirro	Audi 3.6 L Turbo V8	M	113
3	LMP	42	(Germany) BMW Motorsport (Germany) Schnitzer Motorsport	(Germany) Jörg Müller (Finland) JJ Lehto	BMW V12 LMR	M	111
3	LMP	42	(Germany) BMW Motorsport (Germany) Schnitzer Motorsport	(Germany) Jörg Müller (Finland) JJ Lehto	BMW S70 6.0 L V12	M	111
4	LMP	43	(Germany) BMW Motorsport (Germany) Schnitzer Motorsport	(France) Jean-Marc Gounon (United States) Bill Auberlen	BMW V12 LMR	M	111
4	LMP	43	(Germany) BMW Motorsport (Germany) Schnitzer Motorsport	(France) Jean-Marc Gounon (United States) Bill Auberlen	BMW S70 6.0 L V12	M	111
5	LMP	1	(United States) Panoz Motor Sports	(Australia) David Brabham (Denmark) Jan Magnussen	Panoz LMP-1 Roadster-S	M	106
5	LMP	1	(United States) Panoz Motor Sports	(Australia) David Brabham (Denmark) Jan Magnussen	Élan 6L8 6.0 L V8	M	106
6	LMP	37	(United States) Intersport Racing	(United States) Jon Field (United States) Rick Sutherland	Lola B2K/10	G	102
6	LMP	37	(United States) Intersport Racing	(United States) Jon Field (United States) Rick Sutherland	Judd GV4 4.0 L V10	G	102
7	LMP	36	(United States) Johansson-Matthews Racing	(Sweden) Stefan Johansson (United Kingdom) Guy Smith	Reynard 2KQ-LM	Y	101
7	LMP	36	(United States) Johansson-Matthews Racing	(Sweden) Stefan Johansson (United Kingdom) Guy Smith	Judd GV4 4.0 L V10	Y	101
8	**GTS**	**92**	**(France) Viper Team Oreca**	**(United States) David Donohue (United States) Tommy Archer**	**Dodge Viper GTS-R**	M	**101**
8	**GTS**	**92**	**(France) Viper Team Oreca**	**(United States) David Donohue (United States) Tommy Archer**	**Dodge 8.0 L V10**	M	**101**
9	GTS	91	(France) Viper Team Oreca	(Monaco) Olivier Beretta (Austria) Karl Wendlinger	Dodge Viper GTS-R	M	101
9	GTS	91	(France) Viper Team Oreca	(Monaco) Olivier Beretta (Austria) Karl Wendlinger	Dodge 8.0 L V10	M	101
10	**GT**	**5**	**(United States) Dick Barbour Racing**	**(Germany) Dirk Müller (Germany) Lucas Luhr**	**Porsche 911 GT3-R**	M	**99**
10	**GT**	**5**	**(United States) Dick Barbour Racing**	**(Germany) Dirk Müller (Germany) Lucas Luhr**	**Porsche 3.6 L Flat-6**	M	**99**
11	GT	51	(United States) Dick Barbour Racing	(Germany) Sascha Maassen (France) Bob Wollek	Porsche 911 GT3-R	M	99
11	GT	51	(United States) Dick Barbour Racing	(Germany) Sascha Maassen (France) Bob Wollek	Porsche 3.6 L Flat-6	M	99
12	GT	6	(United States) Prototype Technology Group	(United States) Johannes van Overbeek (United States) Peter Cunningham	BMW M3	Y	98
12	GT	6	(United States) Prototype Technology Group	(United States) Johannes van Overbeek (United States) Peter Cunningham	BMW 3.2 L I6	Y	98
13	GT	23	(United States) Alex Job Racing	(United States) Randy Pobst (Belgium) Bruno Lambert	Porsche 911 GT3-R	M	98
13	GT	23	(United States) Alex Job Racing	(United States) Randy Pobst (Belgium) Bruno Lambert	Porsche 3.6 L Flat-6	M	98
14	GTS	08	(United States) Roock Motorsport North America	(United States) Zak Brown (United States) Vic Rice	Porsche 911 GT2	Y	97
14	GTS	08	(United States) Roock Motorsport North America	(United States) Zak Brown (United States) Vic Rice	Porsche 3.8 L Turbo Flat-6	Y	97
15	GT	21	(United States) MCR/Aspen Knolls	(United States) Shane Lewis (United States) Cort Wagner	Porsche 911 GT3-R	P	96
15	GT	21	(United States) MCR/Aspen Knolls	(United States) Shane Lewis (United States) Cort Wagner	Porsche 3.6 L Flat-6	P	96
16	GT	22	(United States) Alex Job Racing	(United States) Mike Fitzgerald (United States) Robert Nagel	Porsche 911 GT3-R	M	96
16	GT	22	(United States) Alex Job Racing	(United States) Mike Fitzgerald (United States) Robert Nagel	Porsche 3.6 L Flat-6	M	96
17	GT	30	(United States) White Lightning Racing	(United States) Gunnar Jeannette (United States) Mike Petersen	Porsche 911 GT3-R	M	92
17	GT	30	(United States) White Lightning Racing	(United States) Gunnar Jeannette (United States) Mike Petersen	Porsche 3.6 L Flat-6	M	92
18	GT	67	(United States) The Racer's Group	(United States) Steve Ariana (United States) Jennifer Tumminelli	Porsche 911 GT3-R	P	76
18	GT	67	(United States) The Racer's Group	(United States) Steve Ariana (United States) Jennifer Tumminelli	Porsche 3.6 L Flat-6	P	76
19 DNF	GT	52	(Germany) Seikel Motorsport	(Canada) Tony Burgess (Italy) Stefano Buttiero	Porsche 911 GT3-R	D	71
19 DNF	GT	52	(Germany) Seikel Motorsport	(Canada) Tony Burgess (Italy) Stefano Buttiero	Porsche 3.6 L Flat-6	D	71
20 DNF	LMP	2	(United States) Panoz Motor Sports	(United States) Johnny O'Connell (Japan) Hiroki Katou	Panoz LMP-1 Roadster-S	M	67
20 DNF	LMP	2	(United States) Panoz Motor Sports	(United States) Johnny O'Connell (Japan) Hiroki Katou	Élan 6L8 6.0 L V8	M	67
21 DNF	LMP	38	(United States) Champion Racing	(United States) Dorsey Schroeder (United Kingdom) James Weaver	Lola B2K/10	M	62
21 DNF	LMP	38	(United States) Champion Racing	(United States) Dorsey Schroeder (United Kingdom) James Weaver	Porsche 3.6 L Turbo Flat-6	M	62
22 DNF	GT	70	(Australia) Skea Racing International	(United Kingdom) Johnny Mowlem (United States) David Murry	Porsche 911 GT3-R	P	49
22 DNF	GT	70	(Australia) Skea Racing International	(United Kingdom) Johnny Mowlem (United States) David Murry	Porsche 3.6 L Flat-6	P	49
23 DNF	GT	71	(Australia) Skea Racing International	(Australia) Rohan Skea (United States) Doc Bundy	Porsche 911 GT3-R	P	38
23 DNF	GT	71	(Australia) Skea Racing International	(Australia) Rohan Skea (United States) Doc Bundy	Porsche 3.6L Flat-6	P	38
24 DNF	LMP	24	(United States) Johansson-Matthews Racing	(United States) Jim Matthews (United States) Mark Simo	Reynard 2KQ-LM	Y	22
24 DNF	LMP	24	(United States) Johansson-Matthews Racing	(United States) Jim Matthews (United States) Mark Simo	Judd GV4 4.0 L V10	Y	22
25 DNF	LMP	0	(Italy) Team Rafanelli SRL	(Italy) Mimmo Schiattarella (Belgium) Didier de Radiguès	Lola B2K/10	M	21
25 DNF	LMP	0	(Italy) Team Rafanelli SRL	(Italy) Mimmo Schiattarella (Belgium) Didier de Radiguès	Judd (Rafanelli) GV4 4.0 L V10	M	21
26 DNF	GT	10	(United States) Prototype Technology Group	(United States) Brian Cunningham (Sweden) Niclas Jönsson	BMW M3	Y	20
26 DNF	GT	10	(United States) Prototype Technology Group	(United States) Brian Cunningham (Sweden) Niclas Jönsson	BMW 3.2 L I6	Y	20
27 DNF	GT	66	(United States) The Racer's Group	(United States) Kevin Buckler (United States) Rick Knoop	Porsche 911 GT3-R	P	7
27 DNF	GT	66	(United States) The Racer's Group	(United States) Kevin Buckler (United States) Rick Knoop	Porsche 3.6 L Flat-6	P	7
28 DNF	GT	69	(Canada) Kyser Racing	(Canada) Greg Doff (United States) Joe Foster	Porsche 911 GT3-R	P	4
28 DNF	GT	69	(Canada) Kyser Racing	(Canada) Greg Doff (United States) Joe Foster	Porsche 3.6 L Flat-6	P	4
DSQ^{†}	GT	7	(United States) Prototype Technology Group	(United States) Boris Said (Germany) Hans-Joachim Stuck	BMW M3	Y	100
DSQ^{†}	GT	7	(United States) Prototype Technology Group	(United States) Boris Said (Germany) Hans-Joachim Stuck	BMW 3.2 L I6	Y	100

† - The #7 Prototype Technology Group entry was disqualified for failing post-race inspection. The car's fuel tank was found to be larger than the rules allowed.

== Statistics ==
- Pole Position: Allan McNIsh - (#77 Audi Sport North America - 1:20.683)
- Fastest Lap: Allan McNIsh - (#77 Audi Sport North America - 1:22.860)
- Distance - 462.332 km
- Average Speed - 166.583 km/h

American Le Mans Series
Previous race: 2000 1000 km of Nürburgring	2000 season	Next race: 2000 Grand Prix of Mosport
