= BMW V12 LMR =

Open cockpit prototype racing car manufactured by BMW Motorsport and Williams Racing

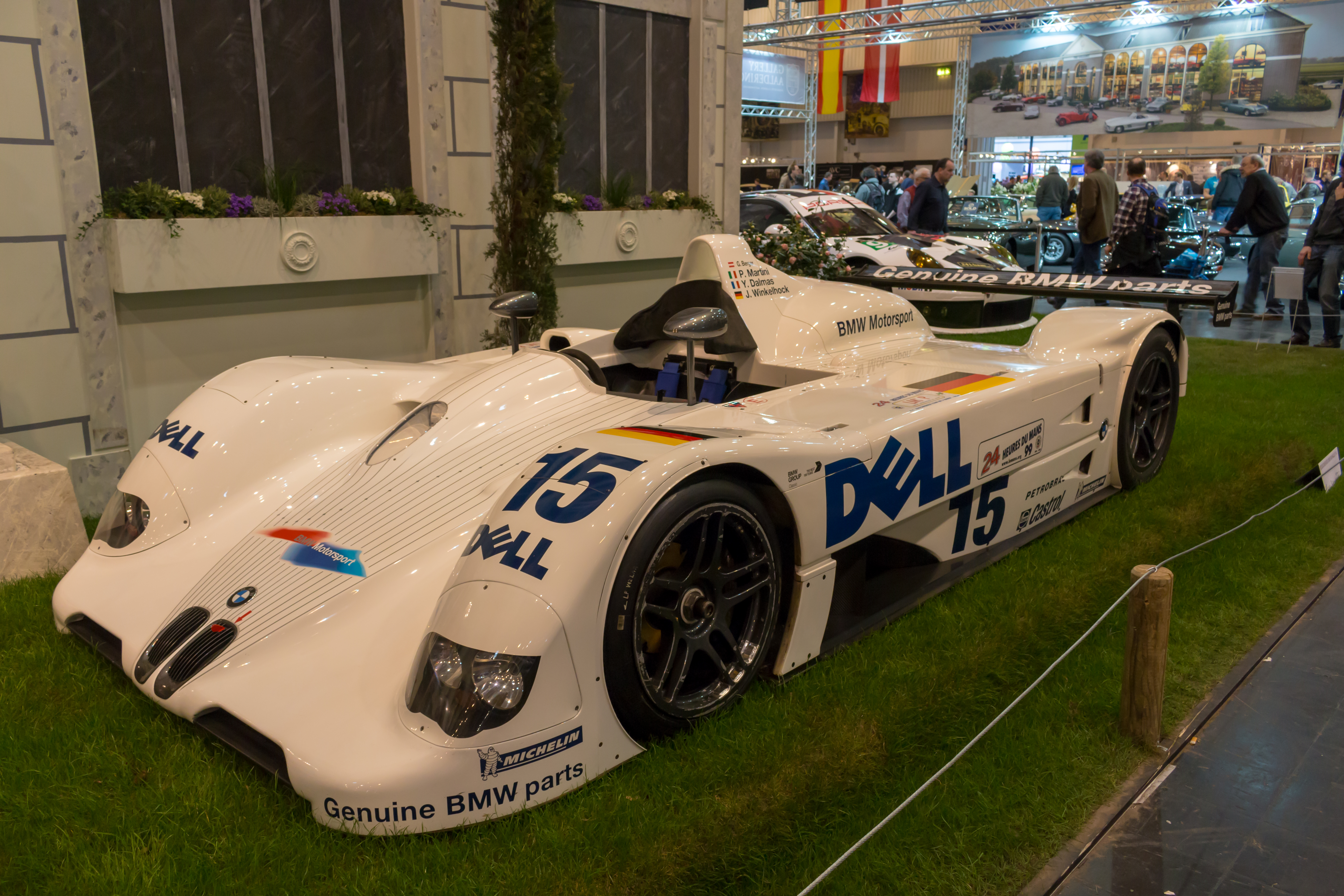
- The No. 15 V12 LMR on display in 2018.
- Category: Le Mans Prototype
- Constructor: (Germany) BMW Motorsport (United Kingdom) Williams Racing (chassis design)
- Designers: John Russell (Chief of Design); Peter Stevens (Chief Stylist); Jason Somerville (Chief Aerodynamicist); Graham Humphrys (Design Consultant)
- Predecessor: BMW V12 LM
- Successor: BMW M Hybrid V8

Technical specifications
- Chassis: Carbon and aluminium honeycomb monocoque
- Engine: BMW S70/3 366 cu in (5,990 cc) V12 Naturally aspirated mid, longitudinally mounted
- Transmission: X-Trac 6-speed sequential manual
- Power: 580–590 hp (430–440 kW)
- Fuel: Petrobras
- Tyres: Michelin radial

Competition history
- Notable entrants: (Germany) BMW Motorsport (Germany) Schnitzer Motorsport
- Notable drivers: (Finland) JJ Lehto; (Germany) Jörg Müller; (United Kingdom) Steve Soper; (Germany) Joachim Winkelhock; (Italy) Pierluigi Martini; (France) Yannick Dalmas; (Denmark) Tom Kristensen; (United States) Bill Auberlen; (France) Jean-Marc Gounon
- Debut: 1999 12 Hours of Sebring
- Last season: 2000
Races	Wins	Poles	F/Laps
18	7	4	3
- Constructors' Championships: 0
- Drivers' Championships: 0

BMW V12 LMR
BMW V12 LMR at Goodwood Festival of Speed 2009

The BMW V12 LMR is a Le Mans Prototype built for sports car racing from 1999 to 2000. The car was built through an alliance between BMW Motorsport and Williams Racing, and was the successor to the failed BMW V12 LM of 1998. It is famous for earning BMW its only overall victory to date at the 24 Hours of Le Mans.

== Development ==
Immediately following the 1998 24 Hours of Le Mans in which both BMW V12 LMs had failed to finish due to mechanical difficulties and a slow pace caused by aerodynamic inefficiencies, BMW Motorsport made the decision to radically revamp their sportscar project and quickly replace the V12 LM with a new car for 1999, the V12 LMR.

The V12 LMR retained only the basic structures of the V12 LM; all of the car's bodywork was redone from scratch. The cooling ducts, a major problem on the V12 LM, were moved to the top of the car instead of from the bottom where it had suffered from ambient track heat. Among the more radical design features was the use of a small roll hoop located only behind the driver's seat, instead of a wide roll hoop that covered the entire cockpit. This took advantage of a loophole in the ACO's Le Mans prototype regulations, and reduced drag and obstruction for the air to the rear wing. A total of four new chassis were built by Williams Racing in the United Kingdom.

Internally, the V12 LMR retained the same BMW S70/3 5990 cc V12 engine as the V12 LM. Responsibility for running the cars was handed over to Schnitzer Motorsport, which ran the team not only at the 24 Hours of Le Mans but also in the new American Le Mans Series for 1999.

== Racing history ==
=== 1999 ===
Debuting at the 12 Hours of Sebring, BMW Motorsport and Schnitzer Motorsport entered a two-car team. The cars were immediately fast, taking the pole position in qualifying. During the race, both cars ran towards the front for the first six hours. V12 LMR chassis #001 had a large accident, damaging the car to the point that it would never race again. The second V12 LMR took the overall win.

The team went back to Europe with what they had learned at Sebring in order to prepare for Le Mans. In early May, at the initial test session for Le Mans, three V12 LMRs appeared. In the tradition of the famous BMW Art Cars, one of the two undamaged cars featured a paint job created by artist Jenny Holzer. Unlike at Sebring, the V12 LMRs would be facing closed-cockpit prototypes which were theoretically faster over a single lap, but not as fuel-efficient. Even with this apparent setback, a V12 LMR was able to take the fourth-fastest lap time over the practice session, behind two Toyota GT-Ones and a Panoz prototype.

For the race, only two cars appeared, with the Art Car being dropped from the line-up. In qualifying the two LMRs again showed their speed, taking 3rd and 6th places, again beaten only by the Toyota GT-Ones. During the race the V12 LMRs ran strong, outlasting a large number of closed cockpit competitors which suffered woes, including Mercedes-Benz, Nissan, Toyota, and Audi. In the second half of the race, BMW's main competitors were a pair of open-cockpit Audi R8Rs and the lone remaining Toyota GT-One. In the closing hours of the race, the #17 BMW V12 LMR driven by JJ Lehto crashed heavily in the Porsche Curves section of the track due to a stuck throttle. This left the #15 BMW LMR in the lead, less than a lap ahead of the 2nd place Toyota. The Toyota was catching the BMW in the final hour until it suffered a tire blowout at high speed, allowing the Schnitzer BMW team to solidify their lead. The driving team of Joachim Winkelhock, Pierluigi Martini, and Yannick Dalmas were successful in bringing the V12 LMR home for the victory, a single lap ahead of the GT-One.

The BMW V12 LMR is estimated to put out about 580 hp, which in the 1999 24 Hours of Le Mans allowed the German prototype to hit 342 km/h (214 mph) on the Mulsanne Straight.

Following the success of BMW at Le Mans, the team decided to return to North America to finish the American Le Mans Series season. Making their return at Sears Point, the pair of BMWs won again. Over the final four races of the season, the BMWs would take two more victories, losing twice to the American Panoz prototypes. Even with four victories on the season, due to BMW's decision to return to Europe following Sebring and thus miss two ALMS races, BMW failed to take the team's championship, losing to Panoz (which engine was co-develop by Élan and 1999 Winston Cup Series winners Robert Yates Racing) by a mere two points.

=== 2000 ===
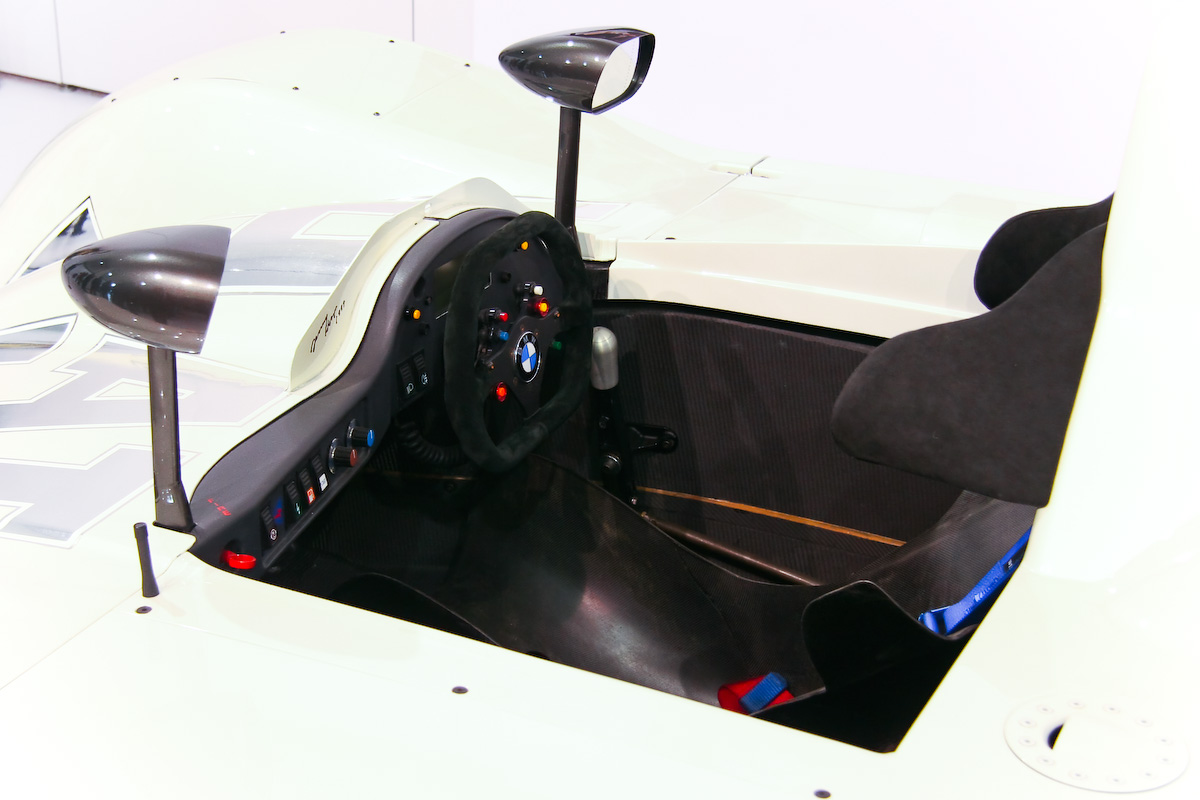
The cockpit of a V12 LMR

For 2000, BMW's alliance with Williams brought the marque into Formula One, with BMW providing the engines for the Williams team. It was therefore decided by BMW that the company would concentrate on the worldwide exposure of Formula One for the future and that they would not return to Le Mans to attempt to follow up on their victory. However, in order to not see the V12 LMRs go to waste, it was decided that BMW would run the full American Le Mans Series season before the cars were retired.

Starting the season at Sebring, the BMWs suddenly found themselves facing new competition, with Audi debuting their second-generation R8 Le Mans prototype. The BMWs found themselves qualified in 5th and 6th, behind both the Audis as well as both Panoz LMPs. During the race, the BMWs were able to outlast the Panozes but struggled with the Audis. BMW was forced to settle for 3rd and 4th behind both Audis.

For the next two rounds, Audi attempted to perfect their R8 for Le Mans and therefore decided to race their older R8R instead. This allowed BMW to take victory at Charlotte and at the European event at Silverstone. In BMW's home race at the Nürburgring in Germany, the V12 LMR lost to a Panoz for the race win, although it did beat an Audi R8.

Returning to America, with Audi having taken victory at Le Mans, the V12 LMR was now forced to finish the rest of the season fighting the dominant R8. For the next four rounds, BMW could do no better than second against the Audi, which won every round.

For Petit Le Mans, BMW decided to bring out chassis #004, the Art Car which had only ever run at Le Mans testing in 1999. The car retained its paint job from Jenny Holzer. The V12 LMRs suffered during the race, including one of the cars backflipping and flying into the side barriers, as had a Porsche 911 GT1 in the same place two years before, and the Art Car was the only V12 LMR able to finish, in fifth place.

BMW did not win either of the final two North American rounds of the season. It was decided by the team that they would not travel to Australia for the final round of the season, instead retiring the cars and concentrating on their new Formula One partnership. BMW took second in the teams' championship behind the dominant Audi. Unlike the V12 LMs, the V12 LMRs were not sold to customers after their retirement.

== Results ==
=== American Le Mans Series ===
Year	Entrant	Engine	Tyres	#	Drivers	Races												Points	TC
Year	Entrant	Engine	Tyres	#	Drivers	SEB	ATL	MOS	SON	POR	PET	MON	LSV					Points	TC
1999	BMW Motorsport; Schnitzer Motorsport	BMW S70 6.0 L V12	M	42	Kristensen/Lehto/Müller	1												147	2nd
1999	BMW Motorsport; Schnitzer Motorsport	BMW S70 6.0 L V12	M	42	Lehto/Müller			DNS			3							147	2nd
1999	BMW Motorsport; Schnitzer Motorsport	BMW S70 6.0 L V12	M	42	Lehto/Soper				1	2		1	1					147	2nd
1999	BMW Motorsport; Schnitzer Motorsport	BMW S70 6.0 L V12	M	43	Dalmas/Martini/Winkelhock	Ret												147	2nd
1999	BMW Motorsport; Schnitzer Motorsport	BMW S70 6.0 L V12	M	43	Auberlen/Winkelhock			DNS	5	4		3	2					147	2nd
1999	BMW Motorsport; Schnitzer Motorsport	BMW S70 6.0 L V12	M	43	Auberlen/Soper/Winkelhock						2							147	2nd
2000	BMW Motorsport; Schnitzer Motorsport	BMW S70 6.0 L V12	M			SEB	CHA	SIL	NUR	SON	MOS	TEX	POR	PET	MON	LSV	ADE	219	2nd
2000	BMW Motorsport; Schnitzer Motorsport	BMW S70 6.0 L V12	M	42	Lehto/Müller	3	1	1	2	3	2	4	3	5	3	26		219	2nd
2000	BMW Motorsport; Schnitzer Motorsport	BMW S70 6.0 L V12	M	43	Auberlen/Gounon/Soper	4												219	2nd
2000	BMW Motorsport; Schnitzer Motorsport	BMW S70 6.0 L V12	M	43	Auberlen/Gounon		4	Ret	10	4	3	5	18	Ret	4	3		219	2nd

=== 24 Hours of Le Mans ===
Year	Entrant	#	Drivers	Class	Laps	Pos.	Class Pos.
1999	(Germany) Team BMW Motorsport (Schnitzer Motorsport)	15	(France) Yannick Dalmas (Italy) Pierluigi Martini (Germany) Joachim Winkelhock	LMP	365	1st	1st
1999	(Germany) Team BMW Motorsport (Schnitzer Motorsport)	17	(Denmark) Tom Kristensen (Finland) JJ Lehto (Germany) Jörg Müller	LMP	304	DNF	DNF
