= BMW V12 LM =

Open cockpit prototype racing car

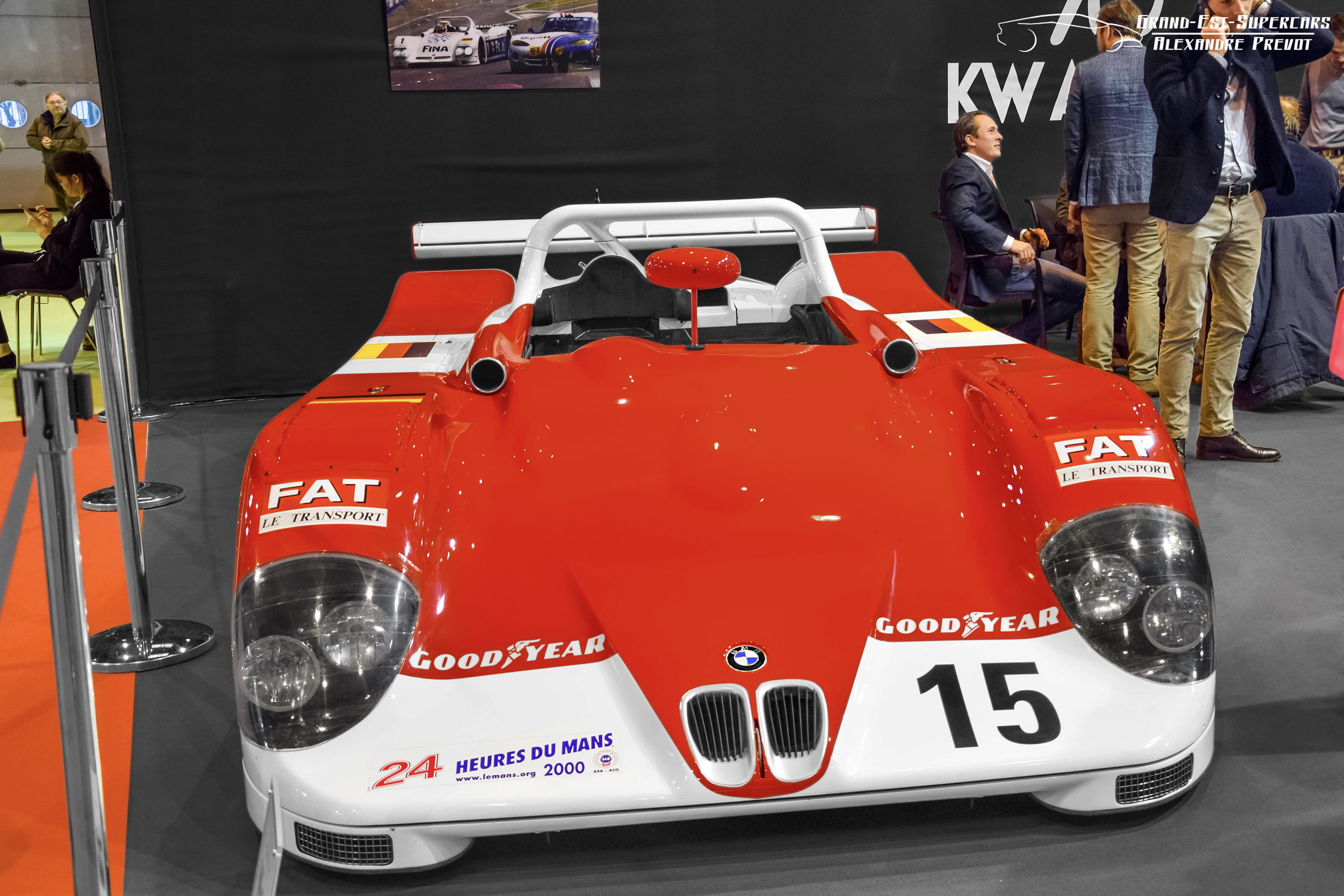
- The No. 15 V12 LM on display in 2016

Overview
- Manufacturer: (Germany) BMW Motorsport (United Kingdom) Williams Racing (chassis designed by)
- Production: 1998
- Designer: John Russell (Chief of Design); Jason Somerville (Chief Aerodynamicist)

Body and chassis
- Class: Le Mans Prototype
- Body style: Open cockpit
- Layout: Longitudinal, Rear mid-engine, rear-wheel-drive

Powertrain
- Engine: 6.0 L (5,990 cc) naturally aspirated BMW S70/3 V12
- Transmission: 6-speed sequential manual

Chronology
- Successor: BMW V12 LMR

The BMW V12 LM was a racing car built for sports car racing in 1998. The car was built using a combination of Williams Racing chassis engineering and construction and a BMW powerplant. The car was the predecessor to the BMW V12 LMR, which debuted in 1999.

== Development ==
In 1995 McLaren Cars entered sports car racing using their McLaren F1 GTR in grand touring series like the BPR Global GT Series as well as the 24 Hours of Le Mans. The McLaren F1s were powered by a S70 V12, leading to McLaren and BMW signing an agreement to both develop their racing teams with the assistance of BMW Motorsport. This combination was successful in winning the 1995 24 Hours of Le Mans. However, by 1997 the F1 GTRs were no longer competitive against newer breeds of specially homologated supercars from Mercedes-Benz and Porsche. Due to their declining performance, McLaren pulled out of GT racing at the end of 1997.

Unwilling to give up so quickly, BMW Motorsport decided to move from grand tourers to Le Mans prototypes, open cockpit racing cars built specifically for racing and requiring no road legality regulations. During the 1997 decline of McLaren, BMW Motorsport announced a deal with Williams Racing, at the time Formula One constructors champions, which would see Williams constructing the car's chassis and develop its aerodynamics for the 24 Hours of Le Mans. At the same time, BMW Motorsport turned to Schnitzer Motorsport, a long time BMW racing team, to be the factory team running the car, now dubbed the V12 LM.

The V12 LMs would use the same S70 V12 as the McLaren F1s, although it would be run in its 5990cc configuration. The chassis incorporated an early use of a raised foot box as well as a front diffuser for better aerodynamics and safety.

== Racing history ==
=== 1998 ===
Debuting at the 1998 24 Hours of Le Mans test day in May, the two V12 LM chassis set times which were not favorable, their best lap placing them 11th behind factory entries from Porsche, Toyota, Nissan, and Mercedes-Benz, all of which were running grand tourer-style cars instead of the theoretically faster Le Mans prototypes. By the time qualifying for the race came around in June, the BMWs had improved to 6th fastest in qualifying, placing behind two Porsches, two Mercedes, and a Toyota.

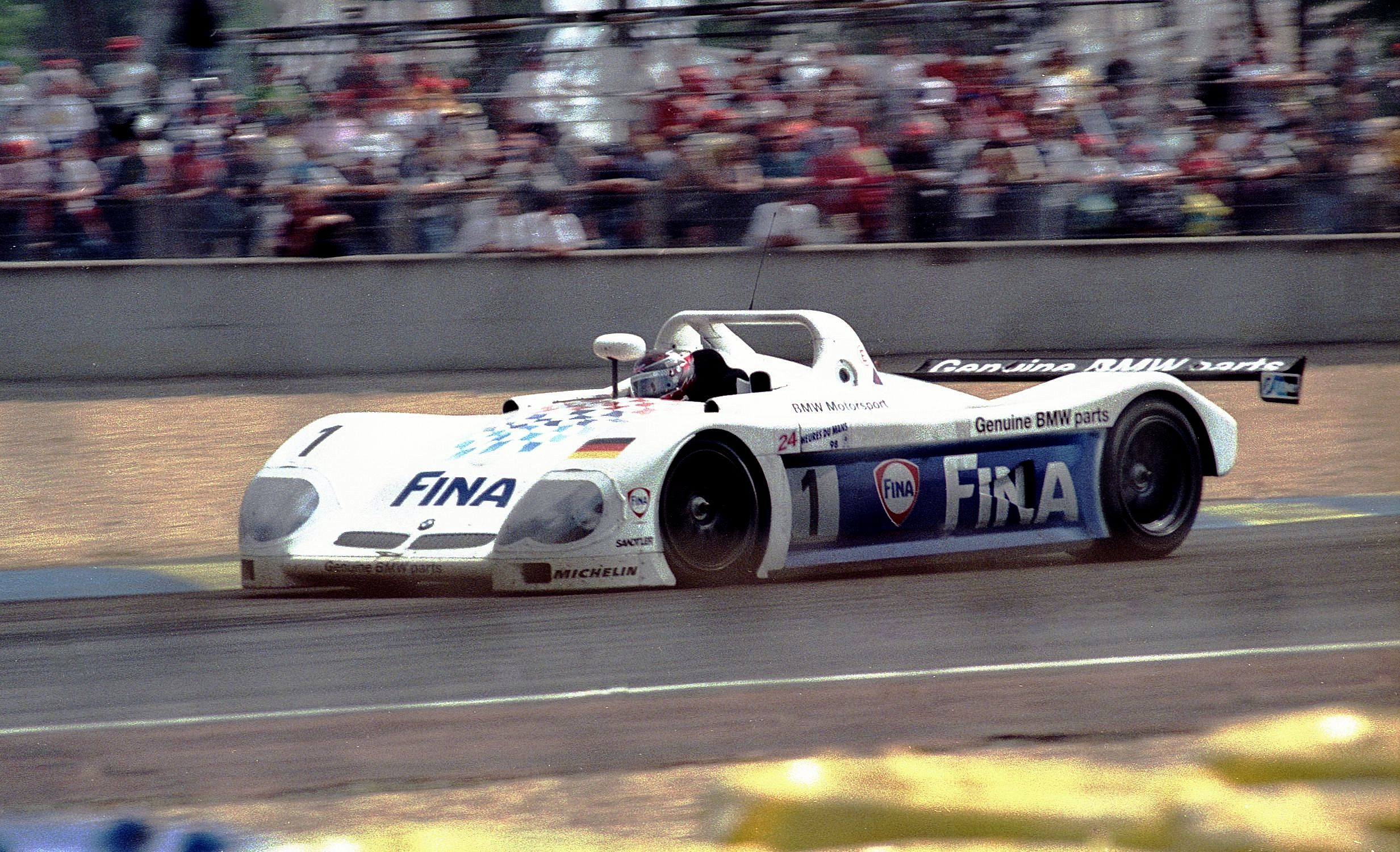
The No. 1 V12 LM during the 1998 24 Hours of Le Mans.

Unfortunately, during the race, both cars suffered quickly. Vibrations were detected in the drivetrains while at speed. In order to not risk a catastrophic failure of the car at speed, the team quickly retired both cars from the event after they had only covered 43 laps for car #2 and 60 laps for car #1.

Following the team's dismal results at Le Mans, further testing found that the aerodynamics and cooling of the car were poorly planned and that the car could only perform best if ambient temperatures were at ideal conditions. The team originally planned to enter the 1998 Petit Le Mans, but later declined. It was therefore decided that the two V12 LMs would be abandoned and that BMW, Williams, and Schnitzer would start anew in 1999 with the V12 LMR. The two V12 LM chassis were therefore sold off to privateers, with chassis 001/98 going to Thomas Bscher while chassis 002/98 was sold to Team Goh of Japan.

=== 1999 ===
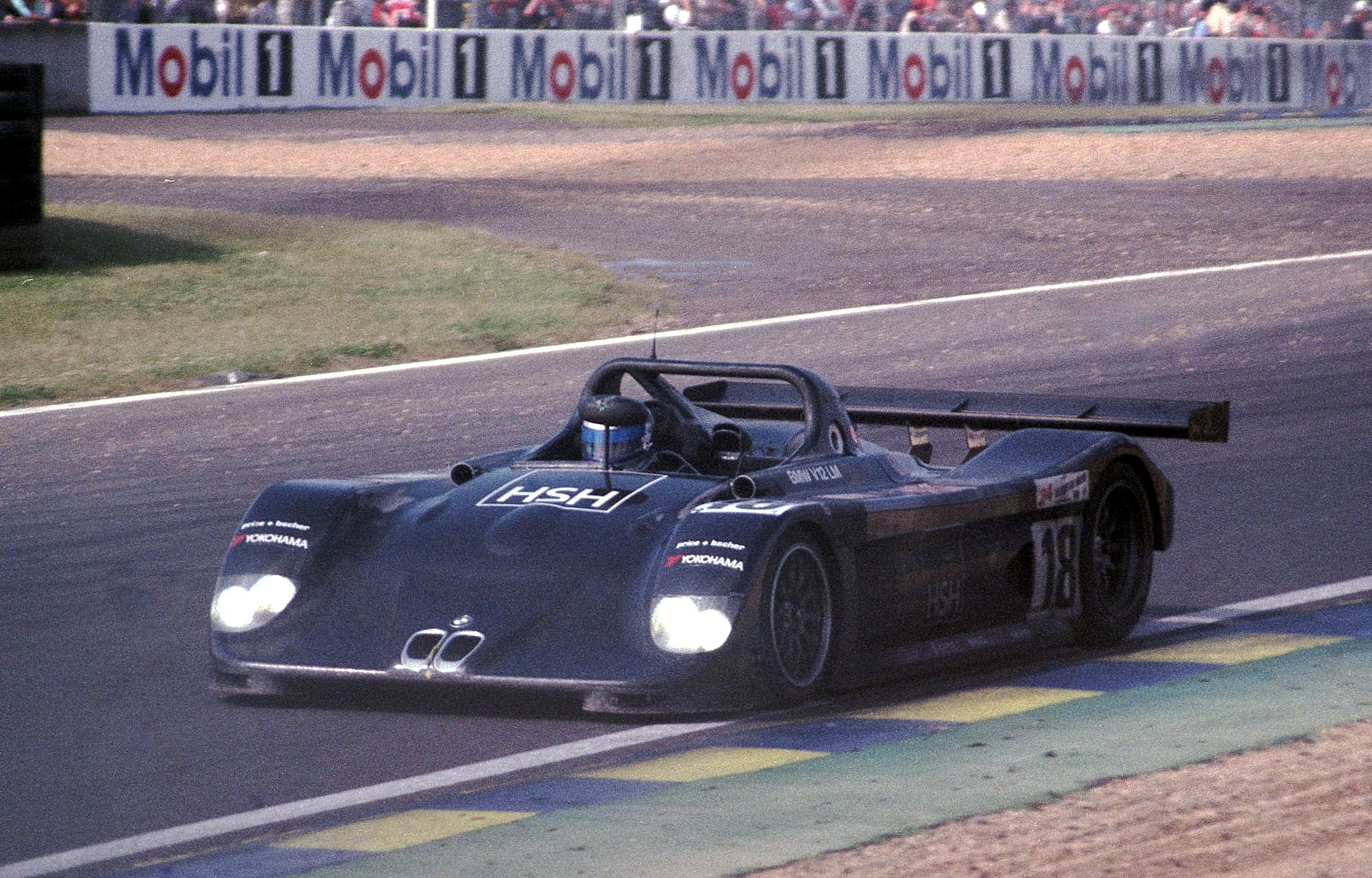
The No. 18 V12 LM of Price+Bscher took fifth at the 1999 24 Hours of Le Mans.

With BMW moving onto the all-new V12 LMR, only the two privateer teams were left to campaign the rejected V12 LM. Thomas Bscher aligned with David Price Racing forming Price+Bscher Racing to concentrate on the new American Le Mans Series as well as the 1999 24 Hours of Le Mans. In the ALMS, the car would take only two points scoring finishes, leaving it 13th in the points standings. While at Le Mans, the car would wind up taking 5th place overall, only 20 laps behind the V12 LMR which won. The car would make one final appearance at an FIA Sportscar Championship event at the Nürburgring, finishing 4th place overall.

Team Goh, on the other hand, decided to concentrate solely on Le Mans, with the car failing to finish due to gearbox problems. The car made one final appearance at the Fuji 1000km where it took 3rd place overall, 6 laps behind a winning Nissan.

=== 2000 ===
For 2000, Team Goh announced a partnership with Japanese constructor Dome, in which the V12 LM would be heavily modified in order to correct its aerodynamic instabilities and cooling problems. The entire front end would be redesigned to relocate the cooling intakes, while vents were added to the side bodywork to assist in cooling. The car never campaigned and no other team chose to buy the chassis.

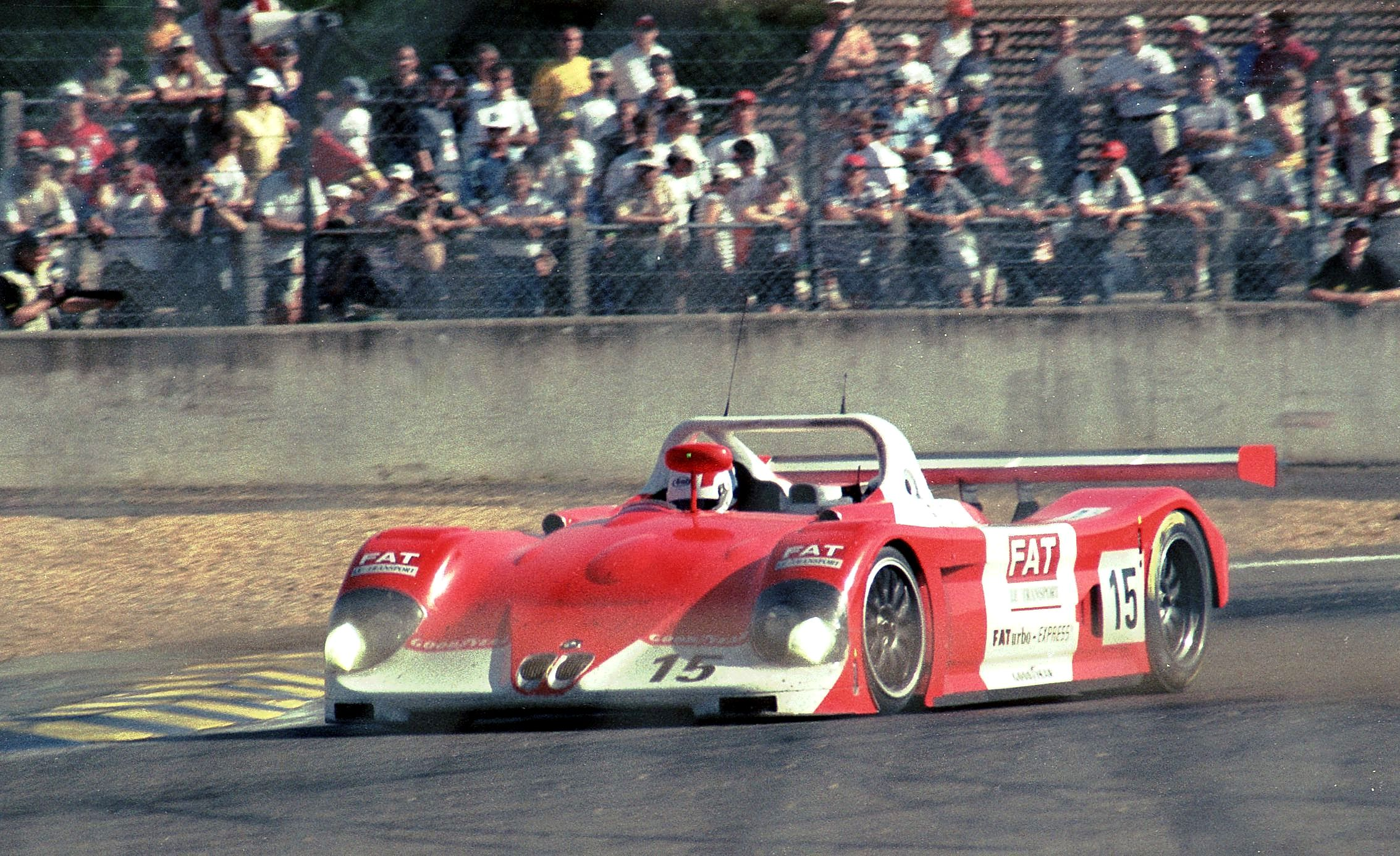
The No. 15 V12 LM at the 2000 24 Hours of Le Mans.

For Price+Bscher, David Price Racing reached an agreement to campaign for Panoz Motorsports of the United States, leaving Thomas Bscher to campaign his lone V12 LM. Although losing his assistance from David Price Racing, Bscher was able to run the car at Le Mans, where the car failed to finish due to gearbox damage from an accident, and at the Nurburgring SRWC round in September. Following this, Bscher would retire the car, ending the racing career of the V12 LM.
