= 2000 Grand Prix of Mosport =

Mosport International Raceway

The 2000 globemegawheels.com Grand Prix of Mosport was an American Le Mans Series professional sports car race held at Mosport International Raceway near Bowmanville, Ontario, Canada from August 4 to the 6, 2000. It was the sixth round of the 2000 American Le Mans Series season and the 15th IMSA / Professional SportsCar Racing sanctioned sports car race held at the facility.

== Race ==
The overall race was won by Audi Sport North America's Audi R8 driven by Rinaldo Capello and Allan McNish for their second successive American Le Mans Series win of the season. The race was one of the closest races in sportscar racing history with the second place BMW V12 LMR driven by Jörg Müller and JJ Lehto for BMW Schnitzer Motorsport only 0.149 seconds behind at the finish. The #43 BMW V12 LMR driven by Jean-Marc Gounon and Bill Auberlen finished third.

The race victory in the GTS class was equally as close with the Viper Team Oreca Dodge Viper GTS-R of Olivier Beretta and Karl Wendlinger beating the local favorite Ron Fellows and his teammate Andy Pilgrim in the Corvette Racing Chevrolet Corvette C5-R by 0.29 seconds.

The GT class victory went Alex Job Racing drivers Randy Pobst and Bruno Lambert in the Porsche 911 GT3-R.

After two sunny days for practice and qualifying, the race was held under cool rainy conditions which led to five caution periods over 23 laps. The race was broadcast across North America on NBC Sports with Allen Bestwick and Bill Adam calling the race.

== Official results ==
Class winners in bold.

Pos	Class	No	Team	Drivers	Chassis	Tyre	Laps
Pos	Class	No	Team	Drivers	Engine	Tyre	Laps
1	**LMP**	**77**	**(Germany) Audi Sport North America**	**(Italy) Rinaldo Capello (United Kingdom) Allan McNish**	**Audi R8**	MI	**94**
1	**LMP**	**77**	**(Germany) Audi Sport North America**	**(Italy) Rinaldo Capello (United Kingdom) Allan McNish**	**Audi 3.6 L Turbo V8**	MI	**94**
2	LMP	42	(Germany) BMW Motorsport (Germany) Schnitzer Motorsport	(Germany) Jörg Müller (Finland) JJ Lehto	BMW V12 LMR	MI	94
2	LMP	42	(Germany) BMW Motorsport (Germany) Schnitzer Motorsport	(Germany) Jörg Müller (Finland) JJ Lehto	BMW S70 6.0 L V12	MI	94
3	LMP	43	(Germany) BMW Motorsport (Germany) Schnitzer Motorsport	(France) Jean-Marc Gounon (United States) Bill Auberlen	BMW V12 LMR	MI	93
3	LMP	43	(Germany) BMW Motorsport (Germany) Schnitzer Motorsport	(France) Jean-Marc Gounon (United States) Bill Auberlen	BMW S70 6.0 L V12	MI	93
4	**GTS**	**91**	**(France) Viper Team Oreca**	**(Monaco) Olivier Beretta (Austria) Karl Wendlinger**	**Dodge Viper GTS-R**	MI	**91**
4	**GTS**	**91**	**(France) Viper Team Oreca**	**(Monaco) Olivier Beretta (Austria) Karl Wendlinger**	**Dodge 8.0L V10**	MI	**91**
5	GTS	3	(United States) Corvette Racing	(United States) Andy Pilgrim (Canada) Ron Fellows	Chevrolet Corvette C5-R	G	91
5	GTS	3	(United States) Corvette Racing	(United States) Andy Pilgrim (Canada) Ron Fellows	Chevrolet 7.0 L V8	G	91
6	GTS	92	(France) Viper Team Oreca	(United States) David Donohue (United States) Tommy Archer	Dodge Viper GTS-R	MI	91
6	GTS	92	(France) Viper Team Oreca	(United States) David Donohue (United States) Tommy Archer	Dodge 8.0 L V10	MI	91
7 DNF	LMP	36	(United States) Johansson-Matthews Racing	(Sweden) Stefan Johansson (United Kingdom) Guy Smith	Reynard 2KQ-LM	Y	90
7 DNF	LMP	36	(United States) Johansson-Matthews Racing	(Sweden) Stefan Johansson (United Kingdom) Guy Smith	Judd GV4 4.0 L V10	Y	90
8	LMP	2	(United States) Panoz Motor Sports	(United States) Johnny O'Connell (Japan) Hiroki Katou	Panoz LMP-1 Roadster-S	MI	89
8	LMP	2	(United States) Panoz Motor Sports	(United States) Johnny O'Connell (Japan) Hiroki Katou	Élan 6L8 6.0 L V8	MI	89
9	**GT**	**23**	**(United States) Alex Job Racing**	**(United States) Randy Pobst (Belgium) Bruno Lambert**	**Porsche 911 GT3-R**	MI	**89**
9	**GT**	**23**	**(United States) Alex Job Racing**	**(United States) Randy Pobst (Belgium) Bruno Lambert**	**Porsche 3.6 L Flat-6**	MI	**89**
10	GT	7	(United States) Prototype Technology Group	(United States) Boris Said (Germany) Hans-Joachim Stuck	BMW M3	Y	88
10	GT	7	(United States) Prototype Technology Group	(United States) Boris Said (Germany) Hans-Joachim Stuck	BMW 3.2 L I6	Y	88
11	GT	51	(United States) Dick Barbour Racing	(Germany) Sascha Maassen (France) Bob Wollek	Porsche 911 GT3-R	MI	87
11	GT	51	(United States) Dick Barbour Racing	(Germany) Sascha Maassen (France) Bob Wollek	Porsche 3.6 L Flat-6	MI	87
12	GT	21	(United States) MCR/Aspen Knolls	(United States) Shane Lewis (United States) Cort Wagner	Porsche 911 GT3-R	P	87
12	GT	21	(United States) MCR/Aspen Knolls	(United States) Shane Lewis (United States) Cort Wagner	Porsche 3.6 L Flat-6	P	87
13	GT	10	(United States) Prototype Technology Group	(United States) Brian Cunningham (United States) Peter Cunningham	BMW M3	Y	87
13	GT	10	(United States) Prototype Technology Group	(United States) Brian Cunningham (United States) Peter Cunningham	BMW 3.2 L I6	Y	87
14	GTS	08	(United States) Roock Motorsport North America	(United States) Zak Brown (United States) Vic Rice	Porsche 911 GT2	Y	87
14	GTS	08	(United States) Roock Motorsport North America	(United States) Zak Brown (United States) Vic Rice	Porsche 3.8 L Turbo Flat-6	Y	87
15	GT	22	(United States) Alex Job Racing	(United States) Mike Fitzgerald (United States) Robert Nagel	Porsche 911 GT3-R	MI	86
15	GT	22	(United States) Alex Job Racing	(United States) Mike Fitzgerald (United States) Robert Nagel	Porsche 3.6 L Flat-6	MI	86
16	GT	70	(Australia) Skea Racing International	(United Kingdom) Johnny Mowlem (United States) David Murry	Porsche 911 GT3-R	P	86
16	GT	70	(Australia) Skea Racing International	(United Kingdom) Johnny Mowlem (United States) David Murry	Porsche 3.6 L Flat-6	P	86
17 DNF	LMP	78	(Germany) Audi Sport North America	(Germany) Frank Biela (Italy) Emanuele Pirro	Audi R8	MI	85
17 DNF	LMP	78	(Germany) Audi Sport North America	(Germany) Frank Biela (Italy) Emanuele Pirro	Audi 3.6 L Turbo V8	MI	85
18	GT	71	(Australia) Skea Racing International	(United States) Grady Willingham (United States) Doc Bundy	Porsche 911 GT3-R	P	78
18	GT	71	(Australia) Skea Racing International	(United States) Grady Willingham (United States) Doc Bundy	Porsche 3.6 L Flat-6	P	78
19	GT	67	(United States) The Racer's Group	(United States) Robert Orcutt (United States) Jennifer Tumminelli	Porsche 911 GT3-R	P	78
19	GT	67	(United States) The Racer's Group	(United States) Robert Orcutt (United States) Jennifer Tumminelli	Porsche 3.6 L Flat-6	P	78
20 DNF	GT	66	(United States) The Racer's Group	(United States) Kevin Buckler (United States) Philip Collin	Porsche 911 GT3-R	P	77
20 DNF	GT	66	(United States) The Racer's Group	(United States) Kevin Buckler (United States) Philip Collin	Porsche 3.6 L Flat-6	P	77
21	GT	69	(Canada) Kyser Racing	(Canada) Greg Doff (Canada) Kye Wankum (Canada) Rudy Bartling	Porsche 911 GT3-R	P	67
21	GT	69	(Canada) Kyser Racing	(Canada) Greg Doff (Canada) Kye Wankum (Canada) Rudy Bartling	Porsche 3.6 L Flat-6	P	67
22	GT	52	(Germany) Seikel Motorsport	(Canada) Tony Burgess (Italy) Stefano Buttiero	Porsche 911 GT3-R	D	45
22	GT	52	(Germany) Seikel Motorsport	(Canada) Tony Burgess (Italy) Stefano Buttiero	Porsche 3.6 L Flat-6	D	45
23 DNF	LMP	1	(United States) Panoz Motor Sports	(Australia) David Brabham (Denmark) Jan Magnussen	Panoz LMP-1 Roadster-S	MI	40
23 DNF	LMP	1	(United States) Panoz Motor Sports	(Australia) David Brabham (Denmark) Jan Magnussen	Élan 6L8 6.0 L V8	MI	40
24 DNF	LMP	24	(United States) Johansson-Matthews Racing	(United States) Jim Matthews (United States) Mark Simo	Reynard 2KQ-LM	Y	18
24 DNF	LMP	24	(United States) Johansson-Matthews Racing	(United States) Jim Matthews (United States) Mark Simo	Judd GV4 4.0 L V10	Y	18
25 DNF	GT	5	(United States) Dick Barbour Racing	(Germany) Dirk Müller (Germany) Lucas Luhr	Porsche 911 GT3-R	MI	13
25 DNF	GT	5	(United States) Dick Barbour Racing	(Germany) Dirk Müller (Germany) Lucas Luhr	Porsche 3.6 L Flat-6	MI	13
26 DNF	GT	6	(United States) Prototype Technology Group	(United States) Johannes van Overbeek (United States) Brian Simo	BMW M3	Y	11
26 DNF	GT	6	(United States) Prototype Technology Group	(United States) Johannes van Overbeek (United States) Brian Simo	BMW 3.2 I6	Y	11
DNS	LMP	0	(Italy) Team Rafanelli SRL	(Italy) Mimmo Schiattarella (Belgium) Didier de Radiguès	Lola B2K/10	MI	-
DNS	LMP	0	(Italy) Team Rafanelli SRL	(Italy) Mimmo Schiattarella (Belgium) Didier de Radiguès	Judd (Rafanelli) GV4 4.0 L V10	MI	-
DNS	LMP	8	(United States) Phil Creighton Motorsports	(United States) Scott Schubot (Canada) Claude Bourbonnais	Lola B2K/10	G	-
DNS	LMP	8	(United States) Phil Creighton Motorsports	(United States) Scott Schubot (Canada) Claude Bourbonnais	Ford (Roush) 6.0 L V8	G	-
DNS	GTS	73	(Canada) Multimatic Motorsports (Canada) Doncaster Racing	(Canada) David Lacey (Canada) Greg Willkins	Porsche 911 GT2	P	-
DNS	GTS	73	(Canada) Multimatic Motorsports (Canada) Doncaster Racing	(Canada) David Lacey (Canada) Greg Willkins	Porsche 3.6 L Turbo Flat-6	P	-

== Statistics ==
- Pole Position - #78 Audi Sport North America - 1:08.432
- Fastest Lap - #77 Audi Sport North America - 1:11.424
- Time of race - 2:46:05.662
- Distance - 371.993 km
- Average Speed - 134.379 km/h

American Le Mans Series
Previous race: 2000 Grand Prix of Sonoma	2000 season	Next race: 2000 Grand Prix of Texas
