= 2000 American Le Mans Series =

30th season of the racing series organized by IMSA

Seasons
- ← 1999 2001 →

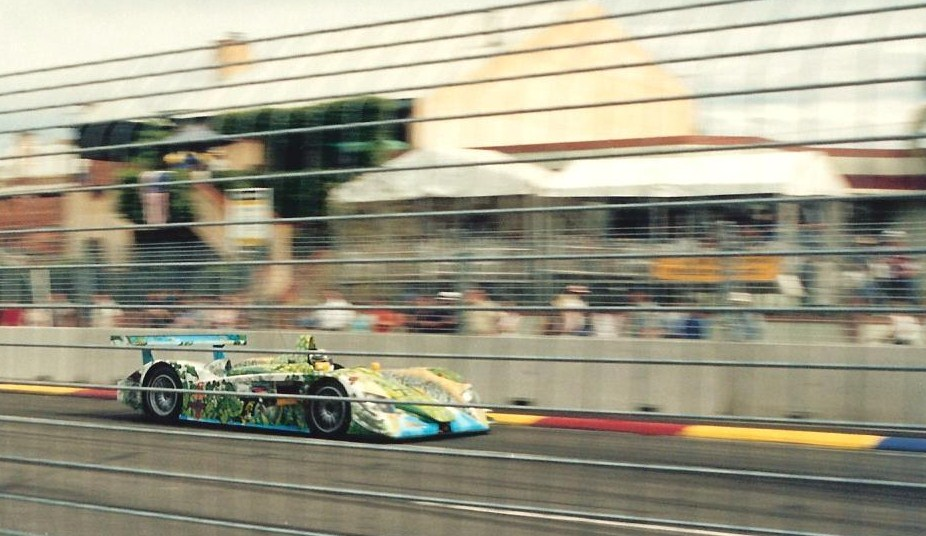
The round winning Audi R8 of Allan McNish & Rinaldo Capello at the Race of a Thousand Years

The 2000 American Le Mans Series was the second running of the IMSA American Le Mans Series, and overall the 30th season of an IMSA GT Championship, dating back to the 1971 edition. It was a series for Le Mans Prototypes (LMP) and Grand Touring (GT) race cars divided into 3 classes: LMP, GTS, and GT. It began March 18, 2000 and ended December 31, 2000 after 12 races.

This season was the first time that the ALMS held races outside of North America, with two events held in Europe and one in Australia. These events helped with the creation of the 2001 European Le Mans Series season, although it was short-lived. An Asian Le Mans Series was also discussed but not developed.

The LMP class champion was Allan McNish, the GTS champion was Olivier Beretta and the GT champion was Dirk Müller. Audi won the Manufacturers championship.

== Schedule ==
| Rnd | Race | Length | Circuit | Location | Date |
|---|---|---|---|---|---|
| 1 | (United States) 12 Hours of Sebring | 12 Hours | Sebring International Raceway | Sebring, Florida | March 18 |
| 2 | (United States) Grand Prix of Charlotte | 2 Hours 45 Minutes | Lowe's Motor Speedway | Concord, North Carolina | April 1 |
| 3 | (United Kingdom) Silverstone 500 USA Challenge | 500 Kilometers | Silverstone Circuit | Silverstone, Northamptonshire | May 13 |
| 4 | (Germany) 1000 km of Nürburgring | 1000 Kilometers | Nürburgring | Nürburg, Rhineland-Palatinate | July 9 |
| 5 | (United States) Grand Prix of Sonoma | 2 Hours 45 Minutes | Sears Point Raceway | Sonoma, California | July 23 |
| 6 | (Canada) Grand Prix of Mosport | 2 Hours 45 Minutes | Mosport Park | Bowmanville, Ontario | August 6 |
| 7 | (United States) Grand Prix of Texas | 2 Hours 45 Minutes | Texas Motor Speedway | Fort Worth, Texas | September 2 |
| 8 | (United States) Rose City Grand Prix | 2 Hours 45 Minutes | Portland International Raceway | Portland, Oregon | September 10 |
| 9 | (United States) Petit Le Mans | 1000 Miles or 10 Hours | Road Atlanta | Braselton, Georgia | September 30 |
| 10 | (United States) Monterey Sports Car Championships | 2 Hours 45 Minutes | Laguna Seca Raceway | Monterey, California | October 15 |
| 11 | (United States) Grand Prix of Las Vegas | 2 Hours 45 Minutes | Las Vegas Motor Speedway | Las Vegas, Nevada | October 29 |
| 12 | (Australia) Race of a Thousand Years | 1000 Kilometers or 6 Hours | Adelaide Street Circuit | Adelaide, South Australia | December 31 |

The following rounds was included on the original calendar but were later cancelled.

| Race | Length | Circuit | Location | Date | Cancellation reason |
|---|---|---|---|---|---|
| (United States) San Diego Grand Prix | 2 Hours 45 Minutes | Streets of San Diego | San Diego, California | Feb. 27/Nov. 5 | Switched to Trans-Am Series |
| Planned Asian round | ?? | ?? | ?? | August 6 | Never materialized |

=== Schedule changes ===
The 2000 schedule greatly expanded from the previous season, adding not only three races outside North America, but an additional North American round as well. Silverstone Circuit and the Nürburgring were scheduled before and after the 24 Hours of Le Mans, while the Race of a Thousand Years in Australia was held long after the North American season ended. Road courses at Charlotte Motor Speedway and Texas Motor Speedway replaced the previous year's Grand Prix of Atlanta at Road Atlanta. There were plans to have a 13th round held in Asia but this failed to materialize.

The San Diego Grand Prix which had initially been on the 1999 calendar before cancellation was once again planning on hosting a race at the former Naval Training Center, initially for November 7th, but then rescheduled to February 27, which would have made it the season opener. The race was once again cancelled and replaced by the Las Vegas Motor Speedway like the previous season. The San Diego Grand Prix would instead host the season finale of the Trans-Am Series.

== Entry list ==
=== Le Mans Prototype (LMP) ===
| Team | Chassis | Engine | Tyre | No. | Drivers | Rnds. |
|---|---|---|---|---|---|---|
| (Italy) Team Rafanelli SRL | Lola B2K/10 | Judd (Rafanelli) GV4 4.0 L V10 | M | 0 | (Italy) Mimmo Schiattarella | 1–3, 5–12 |
| (Italy) Team Rafanelli SRL | Lola B2K/10 | Judd (Rafanelli) GV4 4.0 L V10 | M | 0 | (Belgium) Didier de Radigues | 1–3, 5–12 |
| (Italy) Team Rafanelli SRL | Lola B2K/10 | Judd (Rafanelli) GV4 4.0 L V10 | M | 0 | (Italy) Pierluigi Martini | 1 |
| (Italy) Team Rafanelli SRL | Lola B2K/10 | Judd (Rafanelli) GV4 4.0 L V10 | M | 0 | (Germany) Norman Simon | 9, 12 |
| (Germany) Pole Team | Riley & Scott Mk III | Judd GV4 4.0 L V10 | M | 02 | (Germany) Norman Simon | 1–4 |
| (Germany) Pole Team | Riley & Scott Mk III | Judd GV4 4.0 L V10 | M | 02 | (Germany) Günther Blieninger | 1–4 |
| (Germany) Pole Team | Riley & Scott Mk III | Judd GV4 4.0 L V10 | M | 02 | (United States) Mark Simo | 1–4 |
| (Canada) Multimatic Motorsports | Lola B98/10 | Ford Cosworth XD 2.6 L Turbo V8 | P | 06 | (Canada) Scott Maxwell | 1 |
| (Canada) Multimatic Motorsports | Lola B98/10 | Ford Cosworth XD 2.6 L Turbo V8 | P | 06 | (Canada) John Graham | 1 |
| (Canada) Multimatic Motorsports | Lola B98/10 | Ford Cosworth XD 2.6 L Turbo V8 | P | 06 | (Canada) David Empringham | 1 |
| (United States) Panoz Motor Sports | Panoz LMP-1 Roadster-S (Rd. 1–11) Panoz LMP07 (Rd. 12) | Élan 6L8 6.0L V8 (Rd. 1–11) Élan (Zytek) 4.0L V8 (Rd. 12) | M | 1 | (Denmark) Jan Magnussen | All |
| (United States) Panoz Motor Sports | Panoz LMP-1 Roadster-S (Rd. 1–11) Panoz LMP07 (Rd. 12) | Élan 6L8 6.0L V8 (Rd. 1–11) Élan (Zytek) 4.0L V8 (Rd. 12) | M | 1 | (Australia) David Brabham | 1–11 |
| (United States) Panoz Motor Sports | Panoz LMP-1 Roadster-S (Rd. 1–11) Panoz LMP07 (Rd. 12) | Élan 6L8 6.0L V8 (Rd. 1–11) Élan (Zytek) 4.0L V8 (Rd. 12) | M | 1 | (France) Pierre-Henri Raphanel | 1 |
| (United States) Panoz Motor Sports | Panoz LMP-1 Roadster-S (Rd. 1–11) Panoz LMP07 (Rd. 12) | Élan 6L8 6.0L V8 (Rd. 1–11) Élan (Zytek) 4.0L V8 (Rd. 12) | M | 1 | (Germany) Klaus Graf | 12 |
| (United States) Panoz Motor Sports | Panoz LMP-1 Roadster-S | Élan 6L8 6.0L V8 | M | 2 | (United States) Johnny O'Connell | All |
| (United States) Panoz Motor Sports | Panoz LMP-1 Roadster-S | Élan 6L8 6.0L V8 | M | 2 | (Japan) Hiroki Kato | All |
| (United States) Panoz Motor Sports | Panoz LMP-1 Roadster-S | Élan 6L8 6.0L V8 | M | 2 | (Germany) Klaus Graf | 1, 4, 9, 12 |
| (United States) Panoz Motor Sports | Panoz LMP-1 Roadster-S | Élan 6L8 6.0L V8 | M | 12 | (Australia) David Brabham | 12 |
| (United States) Panoz Motor Sports | Panoz LMP-1 Roadster-S | Élan 6L8 6.0L V8 | M | 12 | (New Zealand) Greg Murphy | 12 |
| (United States) Panoz Motor Sports | Panoz LMP-1 Roadster-S | Élan 6L8 6.0L V8 | M | 12 | (Australia) Jason Bright | 12 |
| (United States) Philip Creighton Motorsport Ltd. | Lola B2K/10 | Ford (Roush) 6.0 L V8 | G | 8 | (United States) Scott Schubot | 1*, 6 |
| (United States) Philip Creighton Motorsport Ltd. | Lola B2K/10 | Ford (Roush) 6.0 L V8 | G | 8 | (United States) Henry Camferdam | 1* |
| (United States) Philip Creighton Motorsport Ltd. | Lola B2K/10 | Ford (Roush) 6.0 L V8 | G | 8 | (Canada) Claude Bourbonnais | 6 |
| (United States) Team Cadillac | Cadillac Northstar LMP | Cadillac Northstar 4.0 L Turbo V8 | P | 9 | (France) Franck Lagorce | 1, 9 |
| (United States) Team Cadillac | Cadillac Northstar LMP | Cadillac Northstar 4.0 L Turbo V8 | P | 9 | (United Kingdom) Andy Wallace | 1, 9 |
| (United States) Team Cadillac | Cadillac Northstar LMP | Cadillac Northstar 4.0 L Turbo V8 | P | 9 | (United States) Butch Leitzinger | 1, 9 |
| (United States) Team Cadillac | Cadillac Northstar LMP | Cadillac Northstar 4.0 L Turbo V8 | P | 19 | (South Africa) Wayne Taylor | 1, 8–10 |
| (United States) Team Cadillac | Cadillac Northstar LMP | Cadillac Northstar 4.0 L Turbo V8 | P | 19 | (Italy) Max Angelelli | 1, 8–10 |
| (United States) Team Cadillac | Cadillac Northstar LMP | Cadillac Northstar 4.0 L Turbo V8 | P | 19 | (Belgium) Eric van de Poele | 1, 9 |
| (United States) Phillips Motorsports, Inc. (United States) Knight Hawk Racing | Lola B2K/40 | Nissan (AER) VQL 3.0L V6 | A | 13 | (United States) Mel Hawkins | 8, 10–11 |
| (United States) Phillips Motorsports, Inc. (United States) Knight Hawk Racing | Lola B2K/40 | Nissan (AER) VQL 3.0L V6 | A | 13 | (United States) Steven Knight | 8, 10–11 |
| (France) Pescarolo Sport | Courage C52 | Peugeot A32 3.2 L Turbo V6 | M | 16 | (France) Sébastien Bourdais | 3–4 |
| (France) Pescarolo Sport | Courage C52 | Peugeot A32 3.2 L Turbo V6 | M | 16 | (France) Olivier Grouillard | 3–4 |
| (France) Pescarolo Sport | Courage C52 | Peugeot A32 3.2 L Turbo V6 | M | 16 | (France) Emmanuel Clérico | 3–4 |
| (France) SMG | Courage C60 | Judd GV4 4.0 L V10 | P | 17 | (France) Philippe Gache | 3–4 |
| (France) SMG | Courage C60 | Judd GV4 4.0 L V10 | P | 17 | (South Africa) Gary Formato | 3 |
| (France) SMG | Courage C60 | Judd GV4 4.0 L V10 | P | 17 | (France) Didier Cottaz | 4 |
| (Germany) Thomas Bscher Promotion | BMW V12 LM | BMW S70 6.0 L V12 | G | 18 | (Germany) Thomas Bscher | 3* |
| (Germany) Thomas Bscher Promotion | BMW V12 LM | BMW S70 6.0 L V12 | G | 18 | (United Kingdom) Geoff Lees | 3* |
| (Monaco) GLV Racing | Ferrari 333 SP | Ferrari F310E 4.0 L V12 | G | 18 | (Italy) Giovanni Lavaggi | 4 |
| (Monaco) GLV Racing | Ferrari 333 SP | Ferrari F310E 4.0 L V12 | G | 18 | (Argentina) Nicolás Filiberti | 4 |
| (Germany) Kremer Racing | Lola B98/K2000 | Ford (Roush) 6.0 L V8 | G | 20 | (Germany) Christian Gläsel | 3–4 |
| (Germany) Kremer Racing | Lola B98/K2000 | Ford (Roush) 6.0 L V8 | G | 20 | (United Kingdom) Christian Vann | 3 |
| (Germany) Kremer Racing | Lola B98/K2000 | Ford (Roush) 6.0 L V8 | G | 20 | (France) Christophe Bouchut | 4 |
| (United Kingdom) Team Ascari | Ascari A410 | Judd GV4 4.0 L V10 | P | 24 | (Netherlands) Klaas Zwart | 3–4 |
| (United Kingdom) Team Ascari | Ascari A410 | Judd GV4 4.0 L V10 | P | 24 | (Brazil) Max Wilson | 3 |
| (United Kingdom) Team Ascari | Ascari A410 | Judd GV4 4.0 L V10 | P | 24 | (South Africa) Werner Lupberger | 4 |
| (United Kingdom) Team Ascari | Ascari A410 | Judd GV4 4.0 L V10 | P | 24 | (Belgium) Jeffrey van Hooydonck | 4 |
| (United States) Johansson-Matthews Racing | Reynard 2KQ-LM | Judd GV4 4.0L V10 | Y | 24 39 | (United States) Jim Matthews | 5–9 |
| (United States) Johansson-Matthews Racing | Reynard 2KQ-LM | Judd GV4 4.0L V10 | Y | 24 39 | (United States) Mark Simo | 5–9 |
| (United States) Johansson-Matthews Racing | Reynard 2KQ-LM | Judd GV4 4.0L V10 | Y | 36 | (Sweden) Stefan Johansson | 1, 3–11 |
| (United States) Johansson-Matthews Racing | Reynard 2KQ-LM | Judd GV4 4.0L V10 | Y | 36 | (United Kingdom) Guy Smith | 1, 3–11 |
| (United States) Johansson-Matthews Racing | Reynard 2KQ-LM | Judd GV4 4.0L V10 | Y | 36 | (United States) Jim Matthews | 1* |
| (Italy) Conrero | Riley & Scott Mk III | Ford Cosworth 4.0 L V8 | G | 25 | (Italy) Beppe Gabbiani | 4 |
| (Italy) Conrero | Riley & Scott Mk III | Ford Cosworth 4.0 L V8 | G | 25 | (Italy) Angelo Lancelotti | 4 |
| (Italy) Conrero | Riley & Scott Mk III | Ford Cosworth 4.0 L V8 | G | 25 | (Bolivia) Felipe Ortiz | 4 |
| (United States) Doran Lista Racing | Ferrari 333 SP | Judd GV4 4.0 L V10 | M | 27 | (Belgium) Didier Theys | 1 |
| (United States) Doran Lista Racing | Ferrari 333 SP | Judd GV4 4.0 L V10 | M | 27 | (Italy) Mauro Baldi | 1 |
| (United States) Doran Lista Racing | Ferrari 333 SP | Judd GV4 4.0 L V10 | M | 27 | (Switzerland) Fredy Lienhard | 1 |
| (Germany) Konrad Motorsport | Lola B2K/10 | Ford (Roush) 6.0L V8 | G | 28 | (Austria) Franz Konrad | 4, 9–12 |
| (Germany) Konrad Motorsport | Lola B2K/10 | Ford (Roush) 6.0L V8 | G | 28 | (Switzerland) Enzo Calderari | 4 |
| (Germany) Konrad Motorsport | Lola B2K/10 | Ford (Roush) 6.0L V8 | G | 28 | (Switzerland) Lilian Bryner | 4 |
| (Germany) Konrad Motorsport | Lola B2K/10 | Ford (Roush) 6.0L V8 | G | 28 | (United States) Charles Slater | 9–12 |
| (Germany) Konrad Motorsport | Lola B2K/10 | Ford (Roush) 6.0L V8 | G | 28 | (United States) Terry Borcheller | 9 |
| (Germany) Konrad Motorsport | Lola B2K/10 | Ford (Roush) 6.0L V8 | G | 28 | (Australia) Alan Heath | 12 |
| (Germany) Konrad Motorsport | Lola B2K/10 | Ford (Roush) 6.0L V8 | G | 35 | (Netherlands) Jan Lammers | 3* |
| (Germany) Konrad Motorsport | Lola B2K/10 | Ford (Roush) 6.0L V8 | G | 35 | (Netherlands) Tom Coronel | 3* |
| (France) Motorola DAMS | Cadillac Northstar LMP | Cadillac Northstar 4.0L Turbo V8 | M | 31 | (France) Emmanuel Collard | 1, 3–4, 9, 12 |
| (France) Motorola DAMS | Cadillac Northstar LMP | Cadillac Northstar 4.0L Turbo V8 | M | 31 | (France) Eric Bernard | 1, 3–4, 9, 12 |
| (France) Motorola DAMS | Cadillac Northstar LMP | Cadillac Northstar 4.0L Turbo V8 | M | 31 | (France) Christophe Tinseau | 1* |
| (France) Motorola DAMS | Cadillac Northstar LMP | Cadillac Northstar 4.0L Turbo V8 | M | 32 | (France) Christophe Tinseau | 1*, 3–4, 9, 12 |
| (France) Motorola DAMS | Cadillac Northstar LMP | Cadillac Northstar 4.0L Turbo V8 | M | 32 | (Belgium) Marc Goossens | 1*, 3–4, 9, 12 |
| (France) Motorola DAMS | Cadillac Northstar LMP | Cadillac Northstar 4.0L Turbo V8 | M | 32 | (France) Franck Montagny | 4 |
| (United States) Intersport Racing | Lola B98/10 (Rd. 1) Lola B2K/10 (Rd. 5, 7–11) | Ford 5.1 L V8 (Rd. 1) Judd GV4 4.0 L V10 (Rd. 5, 7–11) | G | 37 | (United States) Jon Field | 1, 5, 7–11 |
| (United States) Intersport Racing | Lola B98/10 (Rd. 1) Lola B2K/10 (Rd. 5, 7–11) | Ford 5.1 L V8 (Rd. 1) Judd GV4 4.0 L V10 (Rd. 5, 7–11) | G | 37 | (United States) Dale Whittington | 1 |
| (United States) Intersport Racing | Lola B98/10 (Rd. 1) Lola B2K/10 (Rd. 5, 7–11) | Ford 5.1 L V8 (Rd. 1) Judd GV4 4.0 L V10 (Rd. 5, 7–11) | G | 37 | (United States) Don Whittington | 1 |
| (United States) Intersport Racing | Lola B98/10 (Rd. 1) Lola B2K/10 (Rd. 5, 7–11) | Ford 5.1 L V8 (Rd. 1) Judd GV4 4.0 L V10 (Rd. 5, 7–11) | G | 37 | (United States) Rick Sutherland | 5, 7–11 |
| (United States) Intersport Racing | Lola B98/10 (Rd. 1) Lola B2K/10 (Rd. 5, 7–11) | Ford 5.1 L V8 (Rd. 1) Judd GV4 4.0 L V10 (Rd. 5, 7–11) | G | 37 | (United Kingdom) Oliver Gavin | 9 |
| (United States) Champion Racing | Lola B2K/10 | Porsche 3.6 L Turbo Flat-6 | M | 38 | (United Kingdom) James Weaver | 1, 3, 5 |
| (United States) Champion Racing | Lola B2K/10 | Porsche 3.6 L Turbo Flat-6 | M | 38 | (United States) Dorsey Schroeder | 1, 3, 5 |
| (United States) Champion Racing | Lola B2K/10 | Porsche 3.6 L Turbo Flat-6 | M | 38 | (Germany) Ralf Kelleners | 1 |
| (Germany) BMW Motorsport (Germany) Schnitzer Motorsport | BMW V12 LMR | BMW S70 6.0 L V12 | M | 42 | (Finland) J.J. Lehto | 1-11 |
| (Germany) BMW Motorsport (Germany) Schnitzer Motorsport | BMW V12 LMR | BMW S70 6.0 L V12 | M | 42 | (Germany) Jörg Müller | 1-11 |
| (Germany) BMW Motorsport (Germany) Schnitzer Motorsport | BMW V12 LMR | BMW S70 6.0 L V12 | M | 43 | (United States) Bill Auberlen | 1-11 |
| (Germany) BMW Motorsport (Germany) Schnitzer Motorsport | BMW V12 LMR | BMW S70 6.0 L V12 | M | 43 | (France) Jean-Marc Gounon | 1-11 |
| (Germany) BMW Motorsport (Germany) Schnitzer Motorsport | BMW V12 LMR | BMW S70 6.0 L V12 | M | 43 | (United Kingdom) Steve Soper | 1 |
| (France) ROC | Reynard 2KQ-LM | Volkswagen 2.0 L Turbo I4 | M | 53 | (Germany) Ralf Kelleners | 4 |
| (France) ROC | Reynard 2KQ-LM | Volkswagen 2.0 L Turbo I4 | M | 53 | (France) Jérôme Policand | 4 |
| (France) ROC | Reynard 2KQ-LM | Volkswagen 2.0 L Turbo I4 | M | 54 | (France) Jean-Christophe Boullion | 4 |
| (France) ROC | Reynard 2KQ-LM | Volkswagen 2.0 L Turbo I4 | M | 54 | (Spain) Jordi Gené | 4 |
| (Italy) R&M Endurance Racing SRL | Riley & Scott Mk III | Judd GV4 4.0 L V10 | ? | 55 | (Italy) Fabio Montani | 4* |
| (Italy) R&M Endurance Racing SRL | Riley & Scott Mk III | Judd GV4 4.0 L V10 | ? | 55 | (Italy) Marco Zadra | 4* |
| (Italy) R&M Endurance Racing SRL | Riley & Scott Mk III | Judd GV4 4.0 L V10 | ? | 55 | (South Africa) Gary Formato | 4* |
| (United States) Martin Snow Racing | Lola B2K/40 | Nissan (AER) VQL 3.0L V6 | A | 56 | (United States) Martin Snow | 10–11 |
| (United States) Martin Snow Racing | Lola B2K/40 | Nissan (AER) VQL 3.0L V6 | A | 56 | (United States) Gunnar Jeannette | 10–11 |
| (Belgium) East Belgian Racing Team | Pilbeam MP84 | Nissan (AER) VQL 3.0L V6 | ? | 58 | (Belgium) Pierre Merche | 4* |
| (Belgium) East Belgian Racing Team | Pilbeam MP84 | Nissan (AER) VQL 3.0L V6 | ? | 58 | (New Zealand) Alexander van der Lof | 4* |
| (Belgium) East Belgian Racing Team | Pilbeam MP84 | Nissan (AER) VQL 3.0L V6 | ? | 58 | (United Kingdom) Martin Henderson | 4* |
| (United Kingdom) Project 2000 Raceworks | Pilbeam MP84 | Nissan (AER) VQL 3.0L V6 | D | 67 | (Australia) Jim Cornish | 12 |
| (United Kingdom) Project 2000 Raceworks | Pilbeam MP84 | Nissan (AER) VQL 3.0L V6 | D | 67 | (United Kingdom) Jamie Wall | 12 |
| (United Kingdom) Project 2000 Raceworks | Pilbeam MP84 | Nissan (AER) VQL 3.0L V6 | D | 67 | (United Kingdom) Michael Mallock | 12 |
| (United States) Robinson Racing | Reynard 2KQ | Judd GV4 4.0 L V10 | G | 74 | (United States) George Robinson | 1 |
| (United States) Robinson Racing | Reynard 2KQ | Judd GV4 4.0 L V10 | G | 74 | (United States) Jack Baldwin | 1 |
| (United States) Robinson Racing | Reynard 2KQ | Judd GV4 4.0 L V10 | G | 74 | (United States) Irv Hoerr | 1 |
| (Germany) Audi Sport North America | Audi R8 (Rd. 1, 4–12) Audi R8R (Rd. 2–3) | Audi 3.6 L Turbo V8 | M | 77 | (Italy) Rinaldo Capello | All |
| (Germany) Audi Sport North America | Audi R8 (Rd. 1, 4–12) Audi R8R (Rd. 2–3) | Audi 3.6 L Turbo V8 | M | 77 | (United Kingdom) Allan McNish | All |
| (Germany) Audi Sport North America | Audi R8 (Rd. 1, 4–12) Audi R8R (Rd. 2–3) | Audi 3.6 L Turbo V8 | M | 77 | (Italy) Michele Alboreto | 1–3, 9 |
| (Germany) Audi Sport North America | Audi R8 (Rd. 1, 4–12) Audi R8R (Rd. 2–3) | Audi 3.6 L Turbo V8 | M | 77 | (Australia) Brad Jones | 12* |
| (Germany) Audi Sport North America | Audi R8 (Rd. 1, 4–12) Audi R8R (Rd. 2–3) | Audi 3.6 L Turbo V8 | M | 78 | (Germany) Frank Biela | All |
| (Germany) Audi Sport North America | Audi R8 (Rd. 1, 4–12) Audi R8R (Rd. 2–3) | Audi 3.6 L Turbo V8 | M | 78 | (Italy) Emanuele Pirro | All |
| (Germany) Audi Sport North America | Audi R8 (Rd. 1, 4–12) Audi R8R (Rd. 2–3) | Audi 3.6 L Turbo V8 | M | 78 | (Denmark) Tom Kristensen | 1, 9 |
| (United States) Sezio Florida Racing Team | Norma M-2000-01 | Mader 4.0 L V8 | P | 79 | (France) Patrice Roussel | 1* |
| (United States) Sezio Florida Racing Team | Norma M-2000-01 | Mader 4.0 L V8 | P | 79 | (United States) John Macaluso | 1* |
| (France) PiR Competition | Debora LMP299 | BMW 3.0L I6 | A | 99 | (France) Pierre Bruneau | 4 |
| (France) PiR Competition | Debora LMP299 | BMW 3.0L I6 | A | 99 | (France) Marc Rostan | 4 |

=== Grand Touring Sport (GTS) ===
| Team | Chassis | Engine | Tyre | No. | Drivers | Rnds. |
|---|---|---|---|---|---|---|
| (United States) Roock Motorsport North America | Porsche 911 GT2 | Porsche 3.8 L Turbo Flat-6 | Y | 08 | (United States) Vic Rice | 1–11 |
| (United States) Roock Motorsport North America | Porsche 911 GT2 | Porsche 3.8 L Turbo Flat-6 | Y | 08 | (Germany) Hubert Haupt | 1, 3–4 |
| (United States) Roock Motorsport North America | Porsche 911 GT2 | Porsche 3.8 L Turbo Flat-6 | Y | 08 | (Germany) Claudia Hürtgen | 1 |
| (United States) Roock Motorsport North America | Porsche 911 GT2 | Porsche 3.8 L Turbo Flat-6 | Y | 08 | (United States) Zak Brown | 2–11 |
| (United States) Roock Motorsport North America | Porsche 911 GT2 | Porsche 3.8 L Turbo Flat-6 | Y | 08 | (United States) Mike Fitzgerald | 8 |
| (United States) Roock Motorsport North America | Porsche 911 GT2 | Porsche 3.8 L Turbo Flat-6 | Y | 08 | (United States) Martin Snow | 9 |
| (United States) Roock Motorsport North America | Porsche 911 GT2 | Porsche 3.8 L Turbo Flat-6 | Y | 09 | (United States) Zak Brown | 1 |
| (United States) Roock Motorsport North America | Porsche 911 GT2 | Porsche 3.8 L Turbo Flat-6 | Y | 09 | (Austria) Mandfred Jurasz | 1 |
| (United States) Roock Motorsport North America | Porsche 911 GT2 | Porsche 3.8 L Turbo Flat-6 | Y | 09 | (United States) Stephen Earle | 1 |
| (United States) Roock Motorsport North America | Porsche 911 GT2 | Porsche 3.8 L Turbo Flat-6 | Y | 09 | (United States) Mike Fitzgerald | 7, 9 |
| (United States) Roock Motorsport North America | Porsche 911 GT2 | Porsche 3.8 L Turbo Flat-6 | Y | 09 | (Germany) Jürgen Lorenz | 7 |
| (United States) Roock Motorsport North America | Porsche 911 GT2 | Porsche 3.8 L Turbo Flat-6 | Y | 09 | (United States) Spencer Trenery | 9 |
| (United States) Corvette Racing | Chevrolet Corvette C5-R | Chevrolet 7.0 L V8 | G | 3 | (Canada) Ron Fellows | 1, 6–7, 9–11 |
| (United States) Corvette Racing | Chevrolet Corvette C5-R | Chevrolet 7.0 L V8 | G | 3 | (United Kingdom) Justin Bell | 1, 7*, 9 |
| (United States) Corvette Racing | Chevrolet Corvette C5-R | Chevrolet 7.0 L V8 | G | 3 | (United States) Chris Kneifel | 1, 9 |
| (United States) Corvette Racing | Chevrolet Corvette C5-R | Chevrolet 7.0 L V8 | G | 3 | (United States) Andy Pilgrim | 6–7, 9–11 |
| (United States) Corvette Racing | Chevrolet Corvette C5-R | Chevrolet 7.0 L V8 | G | 4 | (United States) Kelly Collins | 1, 9–10 |
| (United States) Corvette Racing | Chevrolet Corvette C5-R | Chevrolet 7.0 L V8 | G | 4 | (United States) Andy Pilgrim | 1, 9 |
| (United States) Corvette Racing | Chevrolet Corvette C5-R | Chevrolet 7.0 L V8 | G | 4 | (France) Franck Fréon | 1, 9 |
| (United States) Corvette Racing | Chevrolet Corvette C5-R | Chevrolet 7.0 L V8 | G | 4 | (United Kingdom) Justin Bell | 10–11 |
| (United States) Corvette Racing | Chevrolet Corvette C5-R | Chevrolet 7.0 L V8 | G | 4 | (United States) Chris Kneifel | 10–11 |
| (United States) Patriot Motorsports | Dodge Viper GTS-R | Dodge 8.0L V10 | D | 11 | (United States) Tom Weickardt | 9* |
| (United States) Patriot Motorsports | Dodge Viper GTS-R | Dodge 8.0L V10 | D | 11 | (United States) Bret Parker | 9* |
| (United States) Patriot Motorsports | Dodge Viper GTS-R | Dodge 8.0L V10 | D | 12 | (United States) John Paul Jr. | 9 |
| (United States) Patriot Motorsports | Dodge Viper GTS-R | Dodge 8.0L V10 | D | 12 | (United States) Neil Hanneman | 9 |
| (United States) Patriot Motorsports | Dodge Viper GTS-R | Dodge 8.0L V10 | D | 12 | (United States) Bret Parker | 9 |
| (United States) Patriot Motorsports | Dodge Viper GTS-R | Dodge 8.0L V10 | D | 12 | (United States) Henry Gilbert | 9* |
| (Germany) Konrad Motorsport | Porsche 911 GT2 | Porsche 3.8 L Turbo Flat-6 | D | 33 | (Austria) Franz Konrad | 1, 3 |
| (Germany) Konrad Motorsport | Porsche 911 GT2 | Porsche 3.8 L Turbo Flat-6 | D | 33 | (United States) Charles Slater | 1, 4 |
| (Germany) Konrad Motorsport | Porsche 911 GT2 | Porsche 3.8 L Turbo Flat-6 | D | 33 | (United States) John Paul Jr. | 1 |
| (Germany) Konrad Motorsport | Porsche 911 GT2 | Porsche 3.8 L Turbo Flat-6 | D | 33 | (Germany) Jürgen von Gartzen | 3 |
| (Germany) Konrad Motorsport | Porsche 911 GT2 | Porsche 3.8 L Turbo Flat-6 | D | 33 | (Austria) Manfred Jurasz | 4 |
| (Germany) Konrad Motorsport | Porsche 911 GT2 | Porsche 3.8 L Turbo Flat-6 | D | 33 | (Belgium) Michel Neugarten | 4 |
| (Germany) Proton Competition | Porsche 911 GT2 | Porsche 3.6 L Turbo Flat-6 | Y | 35 | (Germany) Christian Ried | 4 |
| (Germany) Proton Competition | Porsche 911 GT2 | Porsche 3.6 L Turbo Flat-6 | Y | 35 | (Germany) Gerold Ried | 4 |
| (United States) Intersport Racing | Porsche 911 GT2 | Porsche 3.8 L Turbo Flat-6 | D | 37 | (United States) Vic Rice | 12 |
| (United States) Intersport Racing | Porsche 911 GT2 | Porsche 3.8 L Turbo Flat-6 | D | 37 | (United States) Kevin Buckler | 12 |
| (United States) DonMcGill.com Porsche Racing | Porsche 911 GT2 | Porsche 3.8 L Turbo Flat-6 | P | 40 | (Canada) Bertrand Godin | 2 |
| (United States) DonMcGill.com Porsche Racing | Porsche 911 GT2 | Porsche 3.8 L Turbo Flat-6 | P | 40 | (United States) Sam Shalala | 2 |
| (United Kingdom) BVB Motorsport | Porsche 911 GT2 | Porsche 3.8 L Turbo Flat-6 | D | 44 | (United Kingdom) Geoff Lister | 3 |
| (United Kingdom) BVB Motorsport | Porsche 911 GT2 | Porsche 3.8 L Turbo Flat-6 | D | 44 | (United Kingdom) Max Beaverbroock | 3 |
| (Germany) Freisinger Motorsport | Porsche 911 GT2 | Porsche 3.8 L Turbo Flat-6 | D | 49 | (France) Stéphane Ortelli | 3–4 |
| (Germany) Freisinger Motorsport | Porsche 911 GT2 | Porsche 3.8 L Turbo Flat-6 | D | 49 | (Germany) Wolfgang Kaufmann | 3–4 |
| (United States) Saleen/Allen Speedlab | Saleen S7-R | Ford 7.0L V8 | P | 55 | (United States) Tommy Kendall | 10 |
| (United States) Saleen/Allen Speedlab | Saleen S7-R | Ford 7.0L V8 | P | 55 | (United States) Terry Borcheller | 10 |
| (United States) Saleen/Allen Speedlab | Saleen S7-R | Ford 7.0L V8 | P | 55 | (United States) Ron Johnson | 10 |
| (Netherlands) Carsport Holland | Chrysler Viper GTS-R | Chrysler 8.0 L V10 | M | 25 | (Netherlands) Tom Coronel | 11 |
| (Netherlands) Carsport Holland | Chrysler Viper GTS-R | Chrysler 8.0 L V10 | M | 25 | (Netherlands) Mike Hezemans | 11 |
| (Germany) Zakspeed | Chrysler Viper GTS-R | Chrysler 8.0 L V10 | D | 60 | (Germany) Peter Zakowski | 4* |
| (United Kingdom) Chamberlain Motorsport | Chrysler Viper GTS-R | Chrysler 8.0 L V10 | M | 61 | (Switzerland) Walter Brun | 3, 11 |
| (United Kingdom) Chamberlain Motorsport | Chrysler Viper GTS-R | Chrysler 8.0 L V10 | M | 61 | (Switzerland) Toni Seiler | 3 |
| (United Kingdom) Chamberlain Motorsport | Chrysler Viper GTS-R | Chrysler 8.0 L V10 | M | 61 | (South Africa) Stephen Watson | 4, 9–10, 12 |
| (United Kingdom) Chamberlain Motorsport | Chrysler Viper GTS-R | Chrysler 8.0 L V10 | M | 61 | (France) Xavier Pompidou | 4, 9 |
| (United Kingdom) Chamberlain Motorsport | Chrysler Viper GTS-R | Chrysler 8.0 L V10 | M | 61 | (Brazil) Thomas Erdos | 4 |
| (United Kingdom) Chamberlain Motorsport | Chrysler Viper GTS-R | Chrysler 8.0 L V10 | M | 61 | (Venezuela) Milka Duno | 9–10, 12 |
| (United Kingdom) Chamberlain Motorsport | Chrysler Viper GTS-R | Chrysler 8.0 L V10 | M | 61 | (Belgium) Didier Defourny | 11 |
| (United Kingdom) Chamberlain Motorsport | Chrysler Viper GTS-R | Chrysler 8.0 L V10 | M | 61 | (Australia) Ray Lintott | 12 |
| (United Kingdom) Chamberlain Motorsport | Chrysler Viper GTS-R | Chrysler 8.0 L V10 | M | 62 | (Austria) Horst Felbermayr Jr. | 3 |
| (United Kingdom) Chamberlain Motorsport | Chrysler Viper GTS-R | Chrysler 8.0 L V10 | M | 62 | (Canada) Michael Culver | 3 |
| (Canada) Multimatic Motorsports | Porsche 911 GT2 | Porsche 3.6 L Turbo Flat-6 | P | 73 | (Canada) David Lacey | 6, 10 |
| (Canada) Multimatic Motorsports | Porsche 911 GT2 | Porsche 3.6 L Turbo Flat-6 | P | 73 | (Canada) Greg Willkins | 6, 10 |
| (France) Viper Team Oreca | Dodge Viper GTS-R | Dodge 8.0 L V10 | M | 91 | (Monaco) Olivier Beretta | All |
| (France) Viper Team Oreca | Dodge Viper GTS-R | Dodge 8.0 L V10 | M | 91 | (Austria) Karl Wendlinger | All |
| (France) Viper Team Oreca | Dodge Viper GTS-R | Dodge 8.0 L V10 | M | 91 | (France) Dominique Dupuy | 1, 12 |
| (France) Viper Team Oreca | Dodge Viper GTS-R | Dodge 8.0 L V10 | M | 91 | (Belgium) Marc Duez | 4, 9 |
| (France) Viper Team Oreca | Dodge Viper GTS-R | Dodge 8.0 L V10 | M | 92 | (United States) Tommy Archer | 1–11 |
| (France) Viper Team Oreca | Dodge Viper GTS-R | Dodge 8.0 L V10 | M | 92 | (United States) David Donohue | 1–8, 10–11 |
| (France) Viper Team Oreca | Dodge Viper GTS-R | Dodge 8.0 L V10 | M | 92 | (Belgium) Marc Duez | 1 |
| (France) Viper Team Oreca | Dodge Viper GTS-R | Dodge 8.0 L V10 | M | 92 | (France) Jean-Philippe Belloc | 4, 12 |
| (France) Viper Team Oreca | Dodge Viper GTS-R | Dodge 8.0 L V10 | M | 92 | (France) Boris Derichebourg | 9 |
| (France) Viper Team Oreca | Dodge Viper GTS-R | Dodge 8.0 L V10 | M | 92 | (Netherlands) Patrick Huisman | 9 |
| (France) Viper Team Oreca | Dodge Viper GTS-R | Dodge 8.0 L V10 | M | 92 | (Portugal) Ni Amorim | 12 |
| (France) Viper Team Oreca | Dodge Viper GTS-R | Dodge 8.0 L V10 | M | 93 | (France) Jean-Philippe Belloc | 1, 9 |
| (France) Viper Team Oreca | Dodge Viper GTS-R | Dodge 8.0 L V10 | M | 93 | (Portugal) Ni Amorim | 1 |
| (France) Viper Team Oreca | Dodge Viper GTS-R | Dodge 8.0 L V10 | M | 93 | (France) Anthony Beltoise | 1 |
| (France) Viper Team Oreca | Dodge Viper GTS-R | Dodge 8.0 L V10 | M | 93 | (United States) David Donohue | 9 |
| (France) Viper Team Oreca | Dodge Viper GTS-R | Dodge 8.0 L V10 | M | 93 | (France) Dominique Dupuy | 9 |

=== Grand Touring (GT) ===
| Team | Chassis | Engine | Tyre | No. | Drivers | Rnds. |
|---|---|---|---|---|---|---|
| (United States) Reiser Callas Rennsport | Porsche 996 GT3-R | Porsche 3.6 L Flat-6 | Y | 02 | (United States) Craig Stanton | 1 |
| (United States) Reiser Callas Rennsport | Porsche 996 GT3-R | Porsche 3.6 L Flat-6 | Y | 02 | (United States) Hurley Haywood | 1 |
| (United States) Reiser Callas Rennsport | Porsche 996 GT3-R | Porsche 3.6 L Flat-6 | Y | 02 | (United States) Joel Reiser | 1 |
| (Germany) RWS Red Bull Motorsport | Porsche 996 GT3-R | Porsche 3.6 L Flat-6 | M | 07 | (Italy) Luca Riccitelli | 1, 3–4 |
| (Germany) RWS Red Bull Motorsport | Porsche 996 GT3-R | Porsche 3.6 L Flat-6 | M | 07 | (Austria) Dieter Quester | 1, 3–4 |
| (Germany) RWS Red Bull Motorsport | Porsche 996 GT3-R | Porsche 3.6 L Flat-6 | M | 07 | (Austria) Philipp Peter | 1 |
| (Germany) RWS Red Bull Motorsport | Porsche 996 GT3-R | Porsche 3.6 L Flat-6 | M | 07 | (Austria) Hans-Jörg Hofer | 3–4 |
| (United Kingdom) Cirtek Motorsport | Porsche 996 GT3-R | Porsche 3.6 L Flat-6 | ? | 09 | (Germany) Jürgen Lorenz | 12* |
| (United States) Dick Barbour Racing | Porsche 996 GT3-R | Porsche 3.6 L Flat-6 | M | 5 | (Germany) Dirk Müller | All |
| (United States) Dick Barbour Racing | Porsche 996 GT3-R | Porsche 3.6 L Flat-6 | M | 5 | (Germany) Lucas Lühr | All |
| (United States) Dick Barbour Racing | Porsche 996 GT3-R | Porsche 3.6 L Flat-6 | M | 15 | (Mexico) Randy Wars | 7–9, 12 |
| (United States) Dick Barbour Racing | Porsche 996 GT3-R | Porsche 3.6 L Flat-6 | M | 15 | (United States) Jennifer Tumminelli | 7–8 |
| (United States) Dick Barbour Racing | Porsche 996 GT3-R | Porsche 3.6 L Flat-6 | M | 15 | (United States) Terry Borcheller | 7–8 |
| (United States) Dick Barbour Racing | Porsche 996 GT3-R | Porsche 3.6 L Flat-6 | M | 15 | (United States) Mike Brockman | 9 |
| (United States) Dick Barbour Racing | Porsche 996 GT3-R | Porsche 3.6 L Flat-6 | M | 15 | (United States) Paul Newman | 9 |
| (United States) Dick Barbour Racing | Porsche 996 GT3-R | Porsche 3.6 L Flat-6 | M | 15 | (Germany) Christian Menzel | 12 |
| (United States) Dick Barbour Racing | Porsche 996 GT3-R | Porsche 3.6 L Flat-6 | M | 15 | (Canada) John Graham | 12 |
| (United States) Dick Barbour Racing | Porsche 996 GT3-R | Porsche 3.6 L Flat-6 | M | 51 | (Germany) Sascha Maassen | All |
| (United States) Dick Barbour Racing | Porsche 996 GT3-R | Porsche 3.6 L Flat-6 | M | 51 | (France) Bob Wollek | All |
| (United States) Prototype Technology Group | BMW M3 (E46) | BMW 3.2 L I6 | Y | 6 | (United States) Johannes van Overbeek | 1–6, 10–11 |
| (United States) Prototype Technology Group | BMW M3 (E46) | BMW 3.2 L I6 | Y | 6 | (Germany) Hans-Joachim Stuck | 1–4 |
| (United States) Prototype Technology Group | BMW M3 (E46) | BMW 3.2 L I6 | Y | 6 | (United States) Boris Said | 1–4 |
| (United States) Prototype Technology Group | BMW M3 (E46) | BMW 3.2 L I6 | Y | 6 | (United States) Peter Cunningham | 5, 10–11 |
| (United States) Prototype Technology Group | BMW M3 (E46) | BMW 3.2 L I6 | Y | 6 | (United States) Brian Simo | 6 |
| (United States) Prototype Technology Group | BMW M3 (E46) | BMW 3.2 L I6 | Y | 6 | (United States) Terry Borcheller | 12 |
| (United States) Prototype Technology Group | BMW M3 (E46) | BMW 3.2 L I6 | Y | 6 | (United States) Anthony Lazzaro | 12 |
| (United States) Prototype Technology Group | BMW M3 (E46) | BMW 3.2 L I6 | Y | 7 | (United States) Boris Said | 5–12 |
| (United States) Prototype Technology Group | BMW M3 (E46) | BMW 3.2 L I6 | Y | 7 | (Germany) Hans-Joachim Stuck | 5–7, 9, 11–12 |
| (United States) Prototype Technology Group | BMW M3 (E46) | BMW 3.2 L I6 | Y | 7 | (United States) Johannes van Overbeek | 7–10, 12 |
| (United States) Prototype Technology Group | BMW M3 (E36) (Rd. 1–2) BMW M3 (E46) (Rd. 3–12) | BMW 3.2 L I6 | Y | 10 | (United States) Brian Cunningham | All |
| (United States) Prototype Technology Group | BMW M3 (E36) (Rd. 1–2) BMW M3 (E46) (Rd. 3–12) | BMW 3.2 L I6 | Y | 10 | (United States) Peter Cunningham | 1–4, 6, 9 |
| (United States) Prototype Technology Group | BMW M3 (E36) (Rd. 1–2) BMW M3 (E46) (Rd. 3–12) | BMW 3.2 L I6 | Y | 10 | (United States) Darren Law | 1 |
| (United States) Prototype Technology Group | BMW M3 (E36) (Rd. 1–2) BMW M3 (E46) (Rd. 3–12) | BMW 3.2 L I6 | Y | 10 | (Sweden) Niclas Jönsson | 3–5, 7–12 |
| (United States) Prototype Technology Group | BMW M3 (E36) (Rd. 1–2) BMW M3 (E46) (Rd. 3–12) | BMW 3.2 L I6 | Y | 10 | (United States) Bill Auberlen | 12 |
| (Switzerland) Haberthur Racing | Porsche 996 GT3-R | Porsche 3.6 L Flat-6 | D | 8 | (Spain) Francesc Gutiérrez | 12 |
| (Switzerland) Haberthur Racing | Porsche 996 GT3-R | Porsche 3.6 L Flat-6 | D | 8 | (France) Patrick Vuillaume | 12 |
| (Switzerland) Haberthur Racing | Porsche 996 GT3-R | Porsche 3.6 L Flat-6 | D | 8 | (Austria) Manfred Jurasz | 12 |
| (United States) Roock Motorsport North America | Porsche 996 GT3-R | Porsche 3.6 L Flat-6 | D | 9 | (Germany) André Ahrlé | 4 |
| (United States) Roock Motorsport North America | Porsche 996 GT3-R | Porsche 3.6 L Flat-6 | D | 9 | (Germany) Michael Eschmann | 4 |
| (United States) Roock Motorsport North America | Porsche 996 GT3-R | Porsche 3.6 L Flat-6 | D | 9 | (Germany) Jürgen Lorenz | 4 |
| (United States) MCR/Aspen Knolls | Porsche 996 GT3-R | Porsche 3.6 L Flat-6 | P | 21 | (United States) Shane Lewis | 1–11 |
| (United States) MCR/Aspen Knolls | Porsche 996 GT3-R | Porsche 3.6 L Flat-6 | P | 21 | (United States) Cort Wagner | 1–9 |
| (United States) MCR/Aspen Knolls | Porsche 996 GT3-R | Porsche 3.6 L Flat-6 | P | 21 | (United States) Bob Mazzuoccola | 1, 9 |
| (United States) MCR/Aspen Knolls | Porsche 996 GT3-R | Porsche 3.6 L Flat-6 | P | 21 | (United States) Darren Law | 10–11 |
| (United States) Alex Job Racing | Porsche 996 GT3-R | Porsche 3.6 L Flat-6 | M | 22 | (United States) Robert Nagel | 2–6 |
| (United States) Alex Job Racing | Porsche 996 GT3-R | Porsche 3.6 L Flat-6 | M | 22 | (United States) Mike Fitzgerald | 2–3, 5–6 |
| (United States) Alex Job Racing | Porsche 996 GT3-R | Porsche 3.6 L Flat-6 | M | 22 | (United States) Joe Foster | 4 |
| (United States) Alex Job Racing | Porsche 996 GT3-R | Porsche 3.6 L Flat-6 | M | 22 | (United States) Peter Argetsinger | 4 |
| (United States) Alex Job Racing | Porsche 996 GT3-R | Porsche 3.6 L Flat-6 | M | 22 | (United States) Mike Conte | 7 |
| (United States) Alex Job Racing | Porsche 996 GT3-R | Porsche 3.6 L Flat-6 | M | 22 | (United States) Anthony Lazzaro | 7 |
| (United States) Alex Job Racing | Porsche 996 GT3-R | Porsche 3.6 L Flat-6 | M | 22 | (United States) Kimberly Hiskey | 8, 11 |
| (United States) Alex Job Racing | Porsche 996 GT3-R | Porsche 3.6 L Flat-6 | M | 22 | (United States) Doug Hebenthal | 8 |
| (United States) Alex Job Racing | Porsche 996 GT3-R | Porsche 3.6 L Flat-6 | M | 22 | (United States) Grady Willingham | 11 |
| (United States) Alex Job Racing | Porsche 996 GT3-R | Porsche 3.6 L Flat-6 | M | 23 | (United States) Randy Pobst | All |
| (United States) Alex Job Racing | Porsche 996 GT3-R | Porsche 3.6 L Flat-6 | M | 23 | (Belgium) Bruno Lambert | All |
| (United States) Alex Job Racing | Porsche 996 GT3-R | Porsche 3.6 L Flat-6 | M | 23 | (United States) Mike Conte | 1 |
| (United States) Alex Job Racing | Porsche 996 GT3-R | Porsche 3.6 L Flat-6 | M | 23 | (United States) Anthony Lazzaro | 9 |
| (United States) White Lightning Racing | Porsche 996 GT3-R | Porsche 3.6 L Flat-6 | P | 30 | (United States) Gunnar Jeannette | 1–2, 5, 7, 9 |
| (United States) White Lightning Racing | Porsche 996 GT3-R | Porsche 3.6 L Flat-6 | P | 30 | (United States) Rod McLeod | 1 |
| (United States) White Lightning Racing | Porsche 996 GT3-R | Porsche 3.6 L Flat-6 | P | 30 | (Germany) Michael Lauer | 1 |
| (United States) White Lightning Racing | Porsche 996 GT3-R | Porsche 3.6 L Flat-6 | P | 30 | (United States) Quentin Wahl | 2 |
| (United States) White Lightning Racing | Porsche 996 GT3-R | Porsche 3.6 L Flat-6 | P | 30 | (United States) Michael Petersen | N/A |
| (United States) White Lightning Racing | Porsche 996 GT3-R | Porsche 3.6 L Flat-6 | P | 30 | (United States) Dale White | 5, 7 |
| (United States) White Lightning Racing | Porsche 996 GT3-R | Porsche 3.6 L Flat-6 | P | 30 | (United States) Robert Nagel | 8 |
| (United States) White Lightning Racing | Porsche 996 GT3-R | Porsche 3.6 L Flat-6 | P | 30 | (United States) Wade Gaughran | 8 |
| (United States) White Lightning Racing | Porsche 996 GT3-R | Porsche 3.6 L Flat-6 | P | 30 | (United States) Joe Policastro Jr. | 9 |
| (United States) White Lightning Racing | Porsche 996 GT3-R | Porsche 3.6 L Flat-6 | P | 30 | (United States) Wayne Jackson | 9 |
| (United States) White Lightning Racing | Porsche 996 GT3-R | Porsche 3.6 L Flat-6 | P | 30 | (United States) Mike Fitzgerald | 10–12 |
| (United States) White Lightning Racing | Porsche 996 GT3-R | Porsche 3.6 L Flat-6 | P | 30 | (United States) Cort Wagner | 10–11 |
| (United States) White Lightning Racing | Porsche 996 GT3-R | Porsche 3.6 L Flat-6 | P | 30 | (United States) Randy Pobst | 12 |
| (United States) Orbit | Porsche 996 GT3-R | Porsche 3.6 L Flat-6 | D | 34 | (United States) Peter Baron | 9 |
| (United States) Orbit | Porsche 996 GT3-R | Porsche 3.6 L Flat-6 | D | 34 | (United States) Leo Hindery | 9 |
| (United States) Orbit | Porsche 996 GT3-R | Porsche 3.6 L Flat-6 | D | 34 | (United States) Gian Luigi Buitoni | 9 |
| (United States) Orbit | Porsche 996 GT3-R | Porsche 3.6 L Flat-6 | D | 35 | (United States) Steve Rebeil | 9* |
| (United States) Orbit | Porsche 996 GT3-R | Porsche 3.6 L Flat-6 | D | 35 | (United States) Dave Dullum | 9* |
| (United States) Orbit | Porsche 996 GT3-R | Porsche 3.6 L Flat-6 | D | 35 | (United States) James McCormick | 9* |
| (Switzerland) Team LR Organization | Porsche 996 GT3-R | Porsche 3.6 L Flat-6 | Y | 41 | (France) Christophe Bouchut | 1, 3, 4* |
| (Switzerland) Team LR Organization | Porsche 996 GT3-R | Porsche 3.6 L Flat-6 | Y | 41 | (Italy) Angelo Zadra | 1 |
| (Switzerland) Team LR Organization | Porsche 996 GT3-R | Porsche 3.6 L Flat-6 | Y | 41 | (France) Patrick Cruchet | 1* |
| (Switzerland) Team LR Organization | Porsche 996 GT3-R | Porsche 3.6 L Flat-6 | Y | 41 | (France) Michel Ligonnet | 3 |
| (Switzerland) Team LR Organization | Porsche 996 GT3-R | Porsche 3.6 L Flat-6 | Y | 41 | (Switzerland) Enzo Calderari | 4* |
| (Germany) Seikel Motorsport | Porsche 996 GT3-R | Porsche 3.6 L Flat-6 | D | 52 68 | (Canada) Tony Burgess | 1, 3–6, 9–11 |
| (Germany) Seikel Motorsport | Porsche 996 GT3-R | Porsche 3.6 L Flat-6 | D | 52 68 | (United States) Kurt Mathewson | 1, 9 |
| (Germany) Seikel Motorsport | Porsche 996 GT3-R | Porsche 3.6 L Flat-6 | D | 52 68 | (United States) Philip Collin | 1 |
| (Germany) Seikel Motorsport | Porsche 996 GT3-R | Porsche 3.6 L Flat-6 | D | 52 68 | (Belgium) Michel Neugarten | 3 |
| (Germany) Seikel Motorsport | Porsche 996 GT3-R | Porsche 3.6 L Flat-6 | D | 52 68 | (Italy) Stefano Buttiero | 4–6 |
| (Germany) Seikel Motorsport | Porsche 996 GT3-R | Porsche 3.6 L Flat-6 | D | 52 68 | (Italy) Gabrio Rosa | 4 |
| (Germany) Seikel Motorsport | Porsche 996 GT3-R | Porsche 3.6 L Flat-6 | D | 52 68 | (United States) Grady Willingham | 9 |
| (Germany) Seikel Motorsport | Porsche 996 GT3-R | Porsche 3.6 L Flat-6 | D | 52 68 | (France) Christophe Bouchut | 10–11 |
| (France) Noël del Bello Racing | Porsche 996 GT3-R | Porsche 3.6 L Flat-6 | D | 56 | (France) Noël del Bello | 4 |
| (France) Noël del Bello Racing | Porsche 996 GT3-R | Porsche 3.6 L Flat-6 | D | 56 | (France) Marc Sourd | 4 |
| (France) Noël del Bello Racing | Porsche 996 GT3-R | Porsche 3.6 L Flat-6 | D | 56 | (France) Roland Bervillé | 4 |
| (United States) The Racer's Group | Porsche 996 GT3-R | Porsche 3.6 L Flat-6 | P | 66 | (United States) Kevin Buckler | 1, 6–11 |
| (United States) The Racer's Group | Porsche 996 GT3-R | Porsche 3.6 L Flat-6 | P | 66 | (United States) Robert Nagel | 1 |
| (United States) The Racer's Group | Porsche 996 GT3-R | Porsche 3.6 L Flat-6 | P | 66 | (United States) Mike Fitzgerald | 1 |
| (United States) The Racer's Group | Porsche 996 GT3-R | Porsche 3.6 L Flat-6 | P | 66 | (United States) Rick Knoop | 6 |
| (United States) The Racer's Group | Porsche 996 GT3-R | Porsche 3.6 L Flat-6 | P | 66 | (United States) Philip Collin | 7–11 |
| (United States) The Racer's Group | Porsche 996 GT3-R | Porsche 3.6 L Flat-6 | P | 66 | (United States) Jim Michaelian | 9 |
| (United States) The Racer's Group | Porsche 996 GT3-R | Porsche 3.6 L Flat-6 | P | 66 | (United States) Robert Orcutt | 12 |
| (United States) The Racer's Group | Porsche 996 GT3-R | Porsche 3.6 L Flat-6 | P | 66 | (Australia) Darren Palmer | 12 |
| (United States) The Racer's Group | Porsche 996 GT3-R | Porsche 3.6 L Flat-6 | P | 66 | (Australia) Christian D'Agostin | 12 |
| (United States) The Racer's Group | Porsche 996 GT3-R | Porsche 3.6 L Flat-6 | P | 67 | (United States) Jennifer Tumminelli | 6–7 |
| (United States) The Racer's Group | Porsche 996 GT3-R | Porsche 3.6 L Flat-6 | P | 67 | (United States) Steve Ariana | 6 |
| (United States) The Racer's Group | Porsche 996 GT3-R | Porsche 3.6 L Flat-6 | P | 67 | (United States) Robert Orcutt | 7, 10 |
| (United States) The Racer's Group | Porsche 996 GT3-R | Porsche 3.6 L Flat-6 | P | 67 | (United States) Tom McGlynn | 10–11 |
| (United States) The Racer's Group | Porsche 996 GT3-R | Porsche 3.6 L Flat-6 | P | 67 | (United States) Rick Polk | 11 |
| (Canada) Kyser Racing | Porsche 996 GT3-R | Porsche 3.6 L Flat-6 | P | 69 | (Canada) Kye Wankum | 1, 3–6, 9–12 |
| (Canada) Kyser Racing | Porsche 996 GT3-R | Porsche 3.6 L Flat-6 | P | 69 | (Canada) Greg Doff | 1, 3–6, 9–10 |
| (Canada) Kyser Racing | Porsche 996 GT3-R | Porsche 3.6 L Flat-6 | P | 69 | (Canada) Rudy Bartling | 1, 6 |
| (Canada) Kyser Racing | Porsche 996 GT3-R | Porsche 3.6 L Flat-6 | P | 69 | (Germany) Georg Silbermayr | 4 |
| (Canada) Kyser Racing | Porsche 996 GT3-R | Porsche 3.6 L Flat-6 | P | 69 | (United States) Joe Foster | 5, 9, 11–12 |
| (Canada) Kyser Racing | Porsche 996 GT3-R | Porsche 3.6 L Flat-6 | P | 69 | (United States) Craig Stanton | 10 |
| (Canada) Kyser Racing | Porsche 996 GT3-R | Porsche 3.6 L Flat-6 | P | 69 | (Canada) Jeffrey Pabst | 12 |
| (Australia) Skea Racing International | Porsche 996 GT3-R | Porsche 3.6 L Flat-6 | P | 70 | (United Kingdom) Johnny Mowlem | All |
| (Australia) Skea Racing International | Porsche 996 GT3-R | Porsche 3.6 L Flat-6 | P | 70 | (United States) David Murry | 1–11 |
| (Australia) Skea Racing International | Porsche 996 GT3-R | Porsche 3.6 L Flat-6 | P | 70 | (United Kingdom) Richard Dean | 12 |
| (Australia) Skea Racing International | Porsche 996 GT3-R | Porsche 3.6 L Flat-6 | P | 71 | (Australia) Rohan Skea | 1–5, 7–12 |
| (Australia) Skea Racing International | Porsche 996 GT3-R | Porsche 3.6 L Flat-6 | P | 71 | (United States) Grady Willingham | 1–2, 4–6 |
| (Australia) Skea Racing International | Porsche 996 GT3-R | Porsche 3.6 L Flat-6 | P | 71 | (United States) Lloyd Hawkins | 1 |
| (Australia) Skea Racing International | Porsche 996 GT3-R | Porsche 3.6 L Flat-6 | P | 71 | (United States) Doc Bundy | 3–12 |
| (Australia) Skea Racing International | Porsche 996 GT3-R | Porsche 3.6 L Flat-6 | P | 71 | (United Kingdom) Richard Dean | 8–11 |
| (Australia) Skea Racing International | Porsche 996 GT3-R | Porsche 3.6 L Flat-6 | P | 71 | (Australia) Des Wall | 12 |
| (United States) Gunnar Porsche Racing | Porsche 996 GT3-R | Porsche 3.6 L Flat-6 | M | 75 | (United States) Gunnar Jeannette | 1* |
| (United States) Gunnar Porsche Racing | Porsche 996 GT3-R | Porsche 3.6 L Flat-6 | M | 75 | (United States) Mike Brockman | 1* |
| (United States) Gunnar Porsche Racing | Porsche 996 GT3-R | Porsche 3.6 L Flat-6 | M | 75 | (Germany) Michael Lauer | 1* |
| (Germany) Manthey Racing | Porsche 996 GT3-R | Porsche 3.6 L Flat-6 | M | 76 | (Germany) Olaf Manthey | 4* |
| (Germany) Manthey Racing | Porsche 996 GT3-R | Porsche 3.6 L Flat-6 | M | 76 | (Germany) Kersten Jodexnis | 4* |
| (United States) G & W Motorsports | Porsche 996 GT3-R | Porsche 3.6 L Flat-6 | D | 80 | (United States) Darren Law | 9 |
| (United States) G & W Motorsports | Porsche 996 GT3-R | Porsche 3.6 L Flat-6 | D | 80 | (United States) John Morton | 9 |
| (United States) G & W Motorsports | Porsche 996 GT3-R | Porsche 3.6 L Flat-6 | D | 80 | (United States) Michael Schrom | 9 |
| (United States) G & W Motorsports | Porsche 996 GT3-R | Porsche 3.6 L Flat-6 | D | 81 | (United States) Cindi Lux | 9 |
| (United States) G & W Motorsports | Porsche 996 GT3-R | Porsche 3.6 L Flat-6 | D | 81 | (United Kingdom) Divina Galica | 9 |
| (United States) G & W Motorsports | Porsche 996 GT3-R | Porsche 3.6 L Flat-6 | D | 81 | (United States) Belinda Endress | 9 |
| (United States) MCR/Nygmatech | Porsche 911 Carrera RSR | Porsche 3.8 L Flat-6 | P | 87 | (United Kingdom) Ian James | 1 |
| (United States) MCR/Nygmatech | Porsche 911 Carrera RSR | Porsche 3.8 L Flat-6 | P | 87 | (United States) Tim Robertson | 1 |
| (United States) MCR/Nygmatech | Porsche 911 Carrera RSR | Porsche 3.8 L Flat-6 | P | 87 | (Portugal) Joăo Barbosa | 1 |
| (United States) MCR/Nygmatech | Porsche 996 GT3-R | Porsche 3.6 L Flat-6 | P | 88 | (United States) Leo Hindery | 1 |
| (United States) MCR/Nygmatech | Porsche 996 GT3-R | Porsche 3.6 L Flat-6 | P | 88 | (United States) Peter Baron | 1 |
| (United States) MCR/Nygmatech | Porsche 996 GT3-R | Porsche 3.6 L Flat-6 | P | 88 | (United States) Tony Kester | 1 |
| (United States) MCR/Nygmatech | Porsche 996 GT3-R | Porsche 3.6 L Flat-6 | P | 89 | (United States) Dave Dullum | 1 |
| (United States) MCR/Nygmatech | Porsche 996 GT3-R | Porsche 3.6 L Flat-6 | P | 89 | (United States) James McCormick | 1 |
| (United States) MCR/Nygmatech | Porsche 996 GT3-R | Porsche 3.6 L Flat-6 | P | 89 | (United States) Kurt Baumann | 1 |
| (United States) MCR/Nygmatech | Porsche 996 GT3-R | Porsche 3.6 L Flat-6 | P | 89 | (United Kingdom) Ian James | 2 |
| (United States) MCR/Nygmatech | Porsche 996 GT3-R | Porsche 3.6 L Flat-6 | P | 89 | (Portugal) Joăo Barbosa | 2 |
| (United States) Trinkler Motorsports | Chevrolet Corvette C5 | Chevrolet 7.0 L V8 | G | 94 | (United States) Owen Trinkler | 1*, 9*, 11* |

* Was on the entry list but did not participate in the event.

== Season results ==
Overall winner in bold.

| Rnd | Circuit | LMP Winning Team | GTS Winning Team | GT Winning Team | Results |
| Rnd | Circuit | LMP Winning Drivers | GTS Winning Drivers | GT Winning Drivers | Results |
|---|---|---|---|---|---|
| 1 | Sebring | **(Germany) #78 Audi Sport North America** | (France) #91 Viper Team Oreca | (United States) #5 Dick Barbour Racing | Results |
| 1 | Sebring | **(Germany) Frank Biela** **(Denmark) Tom Kristensen** **(Italy) Emanuele Pirro** | (Monaco) Olivier Beretta (Austria) Karl Wendlinger (France) Dominique Dupuy | (Germany) Dirk Müller (Germany) Lucas Luhr | Results |
| 2 | Charlotte | **(Germany) #42 BMW Motorsport** | (France) #91 Viper Team Oreca | (United States) #51 Dick Barbour Racing | Results |
| 2 | Charlotte | **(Finland) JJ Lehto** **(Germany) Jörg Müller** | (Monaco) Olivier Beretta (Austria) Karl Wendlinger | (France) Bob Wollek (Germany) Sascha Maassen | Results |
| 3 | Silverstone | **(Germany) #42 BMW Motorsport** | (France) #91 Viper Team Oreca | (United States) #51 Dick Barbour Racing | Results |
| 3 | Silverstone | **(Finland) JJ Lehto** **(Germany) Jörg Müller** | (Monaco) Olivier Beretta (Austria) Karl Wendlinger | (France) Bob Wollek (Germany) Sascha Maassen | Results |
| 4 | Nürburgring | **(United States) #1 Panoz Motor Sports** | (France) #91 Viper Team Oreca | (United States) #5 Dick Barbour Racing | Results |
| 4 | Nürburgring | **(Denmark) Jan Magnussen** **(Australia) David Brabham** | (Monaco) Olivier Beretta (Austria) Karl Wendlinger (Belgium) Marc Duez | (Germany) Dirk Müller (Germany) Lucas Luhr | Results |
| 5 | Sears Point | **(Germany) #77 Audi Sport North America** | (France) #92 Viper Team Oreca | (United States) #5 Dick Barbour Racing | Results |
| 5 | Sears Point | **(United Kingdom) Allan McNish** **(Italy) Rinaldo Capello** | (United States) David Donohue (United States) Tommy Archer | (Germany) Dirk Müller (Germany) Lucas Luhr | Results |
| 6 | Mosport | **(Germany) #77 Audi Sport North America** | (France) #91 Viper Team Oreca | (United States) #23 Alex Job Racing | Results |
| 6 | Mosport | **(United Kingdom) Allan McNish** **(Italy) Rinaldo Capello** | (Monaco) Olivier Beretta (Austria) Karl Wendlinger | (United States) Randy Pobst (Belgium) Bruno Lambert | Results |
| 7 | Texas | **(Germany) #78 Audi Sport North America** | (United States) #3 Corvette Racing | (United States) #23 Alex Job Racing | Results |
| 7 | Texas | **(Germany) Frank Biela** **(Italy) Emanuele Pirro** | (Canada) Ron Fellows (United States) Andy Pilgrim | (United States) Randy Pobst (Belgium) Bruno Lambert | Results |
| 8 | Portland | **(Germany) #77 Audi Sport North America** | (France) #91 Viper Team Oreca | (United States) #51 Dick Barbour Racing | Results |
| 8 | Portland | **(United Kingdom) Allan McNish** **(Italy) Rinaldo Capello** | (Monaco) Olivier Beretta (Austria) Karl Wendlinger | (France) Bob Wollek (Germany) Sascha Maassen | Results |
| 9 | Road Atlanta | **(Germany) #77 Audi Sport North America** | (United States) #4 Corvette Racing | (United States) #51 Dick Barbour Racing | Results |
| 9 | Road Atlanta | **(United Kingdom) Allan McNish** **(Italy) Rinaldo Capello** **(Italy) Michele Alboreto** | (United States) Kelly Collins (United States) Andy Pilgrim (France) Franck Fréon | (France) Bob Wollek (Germany) Sascha Maassen | Results |
| 10 | Laguna Seca | **(Germany) #77 Audi Sport North America** | (France) #91 Viper Team Oreca | (United States) #7 PTG | Results |
| 10 | Laguna Seca | **(United Kingdom) Allan McNish** **(Italy) Rinaldo Capello** | (Monaco) Olivier Beretta (Austria) Karl Wendlinger | (Germany) Hans-Joachim Stuck (United States) Boris Said | Results |
| 11 | Las Vegas | **(Germany) #78 Audi Sport North America** | (France) #91 Viper Team Oreca | (United States) #51 Dick Barbour Racing | Results |
| 11 | Las Vegas | **(Germany) Frank Biela** **(Italy) Emanuele Pirro** | (Monaco) Olivier Beretta (Austria) Karl Wendlinger | (France) Bob Wollek (Germany) Sascha Maassen | Results |
| 12 | Adelaide | **(Germany) #77 Audi Sport North America** | (France) #91 Viper Team Oreca | (United States) #5 Dick Barbour Racing | Results |
| 12 | Adelaide | **(United Kingdom) Allan McNish** **(Italy) Rinaldo Capello** | (Monaco) Olivier Beretta (Austria) Karl Wendlinger (France) Dominique Dupuy | (Germany) Dirk Müller (Germany) Lucas Luhr | Results |

== Championship results ==
Points are awarded to the finishers in the following order:

- 25-21-19-17-15-14-13-12-11-10-...

Exceptions being for the 12 Hours of Sebring, 1000 km of Nurburgring, Petit Le Mans, and Race of a Thousand Years which awarded in the following order:

- 30-26-24-22-20-19-18-17-16-15-...

Points were only awarded for the best 10 finishes in the 12 race season. Points won but not counted towards the season championship are listed in italics.

Cars failing to complete 70% of the winner's distance are not awarded points. Teams only score the points of their highest finishing entry in each race.

Points systems
| Race | 1st | 2nd | 3rd | 4th | 5th | 6th | 7th | 8th | 9th | 10th | 11th | 12th | 13th | 14th | 15th | 16th | 17th | 18th | 19th | FL | lap lead |
|---|---|---|---|---|---|---|---|---|---|---|---|---|---|---|---|---|---|---|---|---|---|
| Normal | 25 | 21 | 19 | 17 | 15 | 14 | 13 | 12 | 11 | 10 | 9 | 8 | 7 | 6 | 5 | 4 | 3 | 2 | 1 | 1 | 1 |
| 1000+ km | 30 | 26 | 24 | 22 | 20 | 19 | 18 | 17 | 16 | 15 | 14 | 13 | 12 | 11 | 10 | 9 | 8 | 7 | 6 | 1 | 1 |

=== LMP Drivers' Championship ===
Bold - Pole position. F - Fastest lap. L - led a lap. M - led the most laps. * - Not awarded points.

| Pos. | Driver | Team | SEB (United States) | CLT (United States) | SIL (United Kingdom) | NUR (Germany) | SON (United States) | MOS (Canada) | TEX (United States) | POR (United States) | ATL (United States) | LAG (United States) | LVS (United States) | ADE (Australia) | Pts. |
|---|---|---|---|---|---|---|---|---|---|---|---|---|---|---|---|
| 1 | (United Kingdom) Allan McNish | (Germany) Audi Sport North America | 2^{L} | 8* | 3^{LM} | **14** | **1^{LMF}** | 1^{LF} | **2^{LMF}** | **1^{LM}** | **1^{LMF}** | **1^{LF}** | **2^{LF}** | **1^{LMF}** | 270 |
| 2 | (Italy) Rinaldo Capello | (Germany) Audi Sport North America | 2^{L} | 8* | 3^{L} | **14** | **1^{L}** | 1^{LM} | **2^{L}** | **1^{L}** | **1^{L}** | **1** | **2^{L}** | **1^{L}** | 257 |
| 3 | (Italy) Emanuele Pirro | (Germany) Audi Sport North America | **1^{LF}** | 6* | 4 | 3 | 2^{L} | **6*** | 1 | 4^{LF} | 2 | 2^{L} | 1^{LM} | 5 | 232 |
| 4 | (Germany) Frank Biela | (Germany) Audi Sport North America | **1^{LM}** | 6* | 4* | 3^{LF} | 2 | **6^{L}** | 1^{L} | 4 | 2 | 2^{L} | 1 | 5^{L} | 231 |
| 5 | (Germany) Jörg Müller | (Germany) BMW Motorsport | 3^{L} | **1^{LM}** | 1^{L} | 2^{L} | 3 | 2^{L} | 4 | 3 | 5 | 3 | 9* | | 221 |
| 6 | (Finland) J.J. Lehto | (Germany) BMW Motorsport | 3^{L} | **1^{L}** | 1 | 2^{L} | 3 | 2 | 4 | 3 | 5^{L} | 3^{L} | 9* | | 220 |
| 7 | (Australia) David Brabham | (United States) Panoz Motor Sports | 7 | 2^{L} | 2^{L} | 1^{LM} | 5 | 7 | 3 | 2^{L} | 3^{L} | 12* | 6 | 3 | 213 |
| 8 | (Denmark) Jan Magnussen | (United States) Panoz Motor Sports | 7L | 2^{LF} | 2^{L} | 1^{L} | 5 | 7^{L} | 3 | 2 | 3 | 12* | 6^{L} | 9* | 203 |
| 9 | (United States) Bill Auberlen | (Germany) BMW Motorsport | 4 | 4 | 11 | 9 | 4 | 3 | 5 | 10 | 12 | 4 | 3 | | 161 |
| 10 | (Japan) Hiroki Kato | (United States) Panoz Motor Sports | 13 | 5 | 10 | 4 | 8 | 5 | 6 | 6 | 4 | 10 | 10 | DSQ | 153 |
| 10 | (United States) Johnny O'Connell | (United States) Panoz Motor Sports | 13 | 5 | 10 | 4 | 8 | 5^{L} | 6 | 6^{L} | 4 | 10 | 10 | DSQ | 153 |
| 10 | (France) Jean-Marc Gounon | (Germany) BMW Motorsport | 4 | 4 | 11 | 9^{L} | 4 | 3 | 5 | 10 | 12 | 4 | 3 | | 153 |
| 13 | (Italy) Mimmo Schiattarella | (Italy) Team Rafanelli SRL | 15 | 3 | **8^{L}** | | 11 | DNS | 9 | 7 | 10 | 11 | 4 | 4 | 112 |
| 14 | (Sweden) Stefan Johansson | (United States) Johansson-Matthews Racing | 14 | | 13 | 12 | 7 | 4^{L} | 7 | 5^{L} | 14 | 5 | 5 | | 110 |
| 15 | (United Kingdom) Guy Smith | (United States) Johansson-Matthews Racing | 14 | | 13 | 12 | 7 | 4 | 7 | 5 | 14 | 5 | 5 | | 108 |
| 16 | (Belgium) Didier de Radiguès | (Italy) Team Rafanelli SRL | 15 | 3 | **8^{F}** | | 11 | DNS | 9 | 7 | 10 | 11 | 4 | 4 | 107 |
| 17 | (France) Emmanuel Collard | (France) Motorola DAMS | 10 | | 5 | 11 | | | | | 6 | | | 6 | 81 |
| 18 | (United States) Jon Field | (United States) Intersport Racing | 8 | | | | 6 | | 8 | 9 | 11 | 6 | 8 | | 80 |
| 19 | (Germany) Norman Simon | (Germany) Pole Team | 17 | 7 | 14 | 13 | | | | | | | | | 68 |
| 19 | (Germany) Norman Simon | (Italy) Team Rafanelli SRL | | | | | | | | | 10 | | | 4 | 68 |
| 20 | (France) Éric Bernard | (France) Motorola DAMS | 10 | | 5 | 11 | | | | | 6 | | | 6 | 66 |
| 21 | (United States) Rick Sutherland | (United States) Intersport Racing | | | | | 6 | | 8 | 9 | 11 | 6 | 8 | | 63 |
| 22 | (Italy) Max Angelelli | (United States) Team Cadillac | 6 | | | | | | | 8 | 7 | 7 | | | 62 |
| 22 | (South Africa) Wayne Taylor | (United States) Team Cadillac | 6 | | | | | | | 8 | 7 | 7 | | | 62 |
| 24 | (Denmark) Tom Kristensen | (Germany) Audi Sport North America | **1^{L}** | | | | | | | | 2^{L} | | | | 58 |
| 25 | (Austria) Franz Konrad | (Germany) Konrad Motorsport | | | | 19 | | | | | 13 | 9 | 11 | 2 | 46 |
| 25 | (United States) Charles Slater | (Germany) Konrad Motorsport | | | | | | | | | 13 | 9 | 11 | 2 | 46 |
| 27 | (Germany) Klaus Graf | (United States) Panoz Motor Sports | | | | 4 | | | | | 4 | | | 9 | 44 |
| 27 | (Italy) Michele Alboreto | (Germany) Audi Sport North America | 2*^{L} | 8 | | | | | | | **1^{L}** | | | | 44 |
| 29 | (Belgium) Marc Goossens | (France) Motorola DAMS | | | 12 | 5 | | | | | 9 | | | 7 | 43 |
| 30 | (United States) Mark Simo | (Germany) Pole Team | 17 | 7 | 14 | 13 | | | | | | | | | 42 |
| 30 | (United States) Mark Simo | (United States) Johansson-Matthews Racing | | | | | 10 | 8 | 10 | 11 | | | | | 42 |
| 31 | (Belgium) Eric van de Poele | (United States) Team Cadillac | 6 | | | | | | | | 7 | | | | 37 |
| 32 | (France) Christophe Tinseau | (France) Motorola DAMS | | | 12 | | | | | | 9 | | | 7 | 34 |
| 33 | (Australia) Alan Heath | (Germany) Konrad Motorsport | | | | | | | | | | | | 2 | 26 |
| 34 | (United States) Martin Snow | (United States) Martin Snow Racing | | | | | | | | | | 8 | 7 | | 25 |
| 34 | (United States) Gunnar Jeannette | (United States) Martin Snow Racing | | | | | | | | | | 8 | 7 | | 25 |
| 36 | (New Zealand) Greg Murphy | (United States) Panoz Motor Sports | | | | | | | | | | | | 3 | 24 |
| 36 | (Australia) Jason Bright | (United States) Panoz Motor Sports | | | | | | | | | | | | 3 | 24 |
| 38 | (United Kingdom) Steve Soper | (Germany) BMW Motorsport | 4 | | | | | | | | | | | | 22 |
| 39 | (United States) Jim Matthews | (United States) Johansson-Matthews Racing | 14 | | | | 10 | 8 | 10 | 11 | | | | | 21 |
| 40 | (Belgium) Didier Theys | (United States) Doran Lista Racing | 5 | | | | | | | | | | | | 20 |
| 40 | (Italy) Mauro Baldi | (United States) Doran Lista Racing | 5 | | | | | | | | | | | | 20 |
| 40 | (France) Franck Montagny | (France) Motorola DAMS | | | | 5 | | | | | | | | | 20 |
| 43 | (Germany) Ralf Kelleners | (United States) Champion Racing | 9 | | | | | | | | | | | | 19 |
| 43 | (Germany) Ralf Kelleners | (France) ROC | | | | 6 | | | | | | | | | 19 |
| 43 | (Germany) Ralf Kelleners | (United States) Johansson-Matthews Racing | | | | | | | | | 14 | | | | 19 |
| 43 | (France) Jérôme Policand | (France) ROC | | | | 6 | | | | | | | | | 19 |
| 45 | (Argentina) Nicolás Filiberti | (Monaco) GLV Racing | | | | 7 | | | | | | | | | 18 |
| 45 | (Italy) Giovanni Lavaggi | (Monaco) GLV Racing | | | | 7 | | | | | | | | | 18 |
| 47 | (United States) Dale Whittington | (United States) Intersport Racing | 8 | | | | | | | | | | | | 17 |
| 47 | (France) Jean-Christophe Boullion | (France) ROC | | | | 8 | | | | | | | | | 17 |
| 47 | (Spain) Jordi Gené | (France) ROC | | | | 8 | | | | | | | | | 17 |
| 47 | (United Kingdom) Andy Wallace | (United States) Team Cadillac | 12 | | | | | | | | 8 | | | | 17 |
| 47 | (France) Franck Lagorce | (United States) Team Cadillac | 12 | | | | | | | | 8 | | | | 17 |
| 47 | (United States) Butch Leitzinger | (United States) Team Cadillac | | | | | | | | | 8 | | | | 17 |
| 53 | (France) Emmanuel Clérico | (France) Pescarolo Sport | | | 6 | | | | | | | | | | 13 |
| 53 | (France) Olivier Grouillard | (France) Pescarolo Sport | | | 6 | | | | | | | | | | 13 |
| 53 | (France) Sébastien Bourdais | (France) Pescarolo Sport | | | 6 | | | | | | | | | | 13 |
| 53 | (Germany) Günther Blieninger | (Germany) Pole Team | 17 | 7 | 14 | 13 | | | | | | | | | 13 |
| 57 | (France) Philippe Gache | (France) SMG | | | 7 | 16 | | | | | | | | | 12 |
| 57 | (South Africa) Gary Formato | (France) SMG | | | 7 | | | | | | | | | | 12 |
| 59 | (United Kingdom) James Weaver | (United States) Champion Racing | 9 | | | | 9 | | | | | | | | 11 |
| 59 | (United States) Dorsey Schroeder | (United States) Champion Racing | 9 | | | | 9 | | | | | | | | 11 |
| 61 | (Germany) Christian Gläsel | (Germany) Kremer Racing | | | 9 | 18 | | | | | | | | | 10 |
| 61 | (United Kingdom) Christian Vann | (Germany) Kremer Racing | | | 9 | | | | | | | | | | 10 |
| 63 | (United States) Mel Hawkins | (United States) Knight Hawk Racing | | | | | | | | DNS | | 13 | 12 | | 8 |
| - | (Switzerland) Fredy Lienhard | (United States) Doran Lista Racing | 5* | | | | | | | | | | | | 0 |
| - | (France) Pierre-Henri Raphanel | (United States) Panoz Motor Sports | 7* | | | | | | | | | | | | 0 |
| - | (United States) Don Whittington | (United States) Intersport Racing | 8* | | | | | | | | | | | | 0 |
| - | (France) Pierre Bruneau | (France) PiR Competition | | | | 10* | | | | | | | | | 0 |
| - | (France) Marc Rostan | (France) PiR Competition | | | | 10* | | | | | | | | | 0 |
| - | (Canada) Scott Maxwell | (Canada) Multimatic Motorsports | 11* | | | | | | | | | | | | 0 |
| - | (Canada) John Graham | (Canada) Multimatic Motorsports | 11* | | | | | | | | | | | | 0 |
| - | (Canada) David Empringham | (Canada) Multimatic Motorsports | 11* | | | | | | | | | | | | 0 |
| - | (United Kingdom) Oliver Gavin | (United States) Intersport Racing | | | | | | | | | 11* | | | | 0 |
| - | (United States) Steven Knight | (United States) Knight Hawk Racing | | | | | | | | DNS | | 13* | 12* | | 0 |
| - | (United States) Terry Borcheller | (Germany) Konrad Motorsport | | | | | | | | | 13* | | | | 0 |
| - | (Italy) Pierluigi Martini | (Italy) Team Rafanelli SRL | 15* | | | | | | | | | | | | 0 |
| - | (Italy) Beppe Gabbiani | (Italy) Conrero | | | | 15* | | | | | | | | | 0 |
| - | (Italy) Angelo Lancelotti | (Italy) Conrero | | | | 15* | | | | | | | | | 0 |
| - | (Bolivia) Felipe Ortiz | (Italy) Conrero | | | | 15* | | | | | | | | | 0 |
| - | (United States) George Robinson | (United States) Robinson Racing | 16* | | | | | | | | | | | | 0 |
| - | (United States) Jack Baldwin | (United States) Robinson Racing | 16* | | | | | | | | | | | | 0 |
| - | (United States) Irv Hoerr | (United States) Robinson Racing | 16* | | | | | | | | | | | | 0 |
| - | (France) Didier Cottaz | (France) SMG | | | | 16* | | | | | | | | | 0 |
| - | (Netherlands) Klaas Zwart | (United Kingdom) Team Ascari | | | DNS | 17* | | | | | | | | | 0 |
| - | (South Africa) Werner Lupberger | (United Kingdom) Team Ascari | | | | 17* | | | | | | | | | 0 |
| - | (Belgium) Jeffrey van Hooydonck | (United Kingdom) Team Ascari | | | | 17* | | | | | | | | | 0 |
| - | (France) Christophe Bouchut | (Germany) Kremer Racing | | | | 18* | | | | | | | | | 0 |
| - | (Switzerland) Enzo Calderari | (Germany) Konrad Motorsport | | | | 19* | | | | | | | | | 0 |
| - | (Switzerland) Lilian Bryner | (Germany) Konrad Motorsport | | | | 19* | | | | | | | | | 0 |
| - | (Brazil) Max Wilson | (United Kingdom) Team Ascari | | | DNS | | | | | | | | | | 0 |
| - | (Canada) Claude Bourbonnais | (United States) Phil Creighton Motorsports | | | | | | DNS | | | | | | | 0 |
| - | (United States) Scott Schubot | (United States) Phil Creighton Motorsports | | | | | | DNS | | | | | | | 0 |
| - | (Australia) Jim Cornish | (United Kingdom) Project 2000 Raceworks | | | | | | | | | | | | DNQ | 0 |
| - | (United Kingdom) Jamie Wall | (United Kingdom) Project 2000 Raceworks | | | | | | | | | | | | DNQ | 0 |
| - | (United Kingdom) Michael Mallock | (United Kingdom) Project 2000 Raceworks | | | | | | | | | | | | DNQ | 0 |
| Pos. | Driver | Team | SEB (United States) | CLT (United States) | SIL (United Kingdom) | NUR (Germany) | SON (United States) | MOS (Canada) | TEX (United States) | POR (United States) | ATL (United States) | LAG (United States) | LVS (United States) | ADE (Australia) | Pts. |

==== LMP Teams Championship ====
Teams only scored the points for their highest finishing entry in each race.

| Pos. | Team | No. | SEB (United States) | CLT (United States) | SIL (United Kingdom) | NUR (Germany) | SON (United States) | MOS (Canada) | TEX (United States) | POR (United States) | ATL (United States) | LAG (United States) | LVS (United States) | ADE (Australia) | Pts. |
|---|---|---|---|---|---|---|---|---|---|---|---|---|---|---|---|
| 1 | (Germany) Audi Sport North America | 77 | 2 | 8 | 3 | **14** | **1** | 1 | **2** | **1** | **1** | **1** | **2** | **1** | 264 |
| 1 | (Germany) Audi Sport North America | 78 | **1** | 6 | 4 | 3 | 2 | **6** | 1 | 4 | 2 | 2 | 1 | 5 | 264 |
| 2 | (Germany) BMW Motorsport | 42 | 3 | **1** | 1 | 2 | 3 | 2 | 4 | 3 | 5 | 3 | 9 | | 219 |
| 2 | (Germany) BMW Motorsport | 43 | 4 | 4 | 11 | 9 | 4 | 3 | 5 | 10 | 12 | 4 | 3 | | 219 |
| 3 | (United States) Panoz Motor Sports | 1 | 7 | 2 | 2 | 1 | 5 | 7 | 3 | 2 | 3 | 12 | 6 | 8 | 208 |
| 3 | (United States) Panoz Motor Sports | 2 | 13 | 5 | 10 | 4 | 8 | 5 | 6 | 6 | 4 | 10 | 10 | DSQ | 208 |
| 3 | (United States) Panoz Motor Sports | 12 | | | | | | | | | | | | 3 | 208 |
| 4 | (Italy) Team Rafanelli SRL | 0 | 15 | 3 | **8** | | 11 | DNS | 9 | 7 | 10 | 11 | 4 | 4 | 136 |
| 5 | (United States) Johansson-Matthews Racing | 24/39 | | | | | 10 | 8 | 10 | 11 | DNP | | | | 130 |
| 5 | (United States) Johansson-Matthews Racing | 36 | 14 | | 13 | 12 | 7 | 4 | 7 | 5 | 14 | 5 | 5 | | 130 |
| 6 | (United States) Intersport Racing | 37 | 8 | | | | 6 | | 8 | 9 | 11 | 6 | 8 | | 94 |
| 7 | (France) Motorola DAMS | 31 | 10 | | 5 | 11 | | | | | 6 | | | 6 | 87 |
| 7 | (France) Motorola DAMS | 32 | | | 12 | 5 | | | | | 9 | | | 7 | 87 |
| 8 | (United States) Team Cadillac | 9 | 12 | | | | | | | | 8 | | | | 62 |
| 8 | (United States) Team Cadillac | 19 | 6 | | | | | | | 8 | 7 | 7 | | | 62 |
| 9 | (Germany) Konrad Motorsport | 28 | | | | 19 | | | | | 13 | 9 | 11 | 2 | 58 |
| 10 | (Germany) Pole Team | 02 | 17 | 7 | 14 | 13 | | | | | | | | | 31 |
| 11 | (United States) Champion Racing | 38 | 9 | | | | 9 | | | | | | | | 27 |
| 12 | (United States) Martin Snow Racing | 56 | | | | | | | | | | 8 | 7 | | 25 |
| 13 | (United States) Doran Lista Racing | 27 | 5 | | | | | | | | | | | | 20 |
| 14 | (France) ROC | 53 | | | | 6 | | | | | | | | | 19 |
| 14 | (France) ROC | 54 | | | | 8 | | | | | | | | | 19 |
| 15 | (Monaco) GLV Racing | 18 | | | | 7 | | | | | | | | | 18 |
| 16 | (France) PiR Competition | 99 | | | | 10 | | | | | | | | | 15 |
| 17 | (Canada) Multimatic Motorsports | 06 | 11 | | | | | | | | | | | | 14 |
| 18 | (France) Pescarolo Sport | 16 | | | 6 | | | | | | | | | | 13 |
| 19 | (France) SMG | 17 | | | 7 | 16 | | | | | | | | | 12 |
| 20 | (Germany) Kremer Racing | 20 | | | 9 | 18 | | | | | | | | | 10 |
| 20 | (Italy) Conrero | 25 | | | | 15 | | | | | | | | | 10 |
| 22 | (United States) Knight Hawk Racing | 13 | | | | | | | | | | | 12 | | 8 |
| 23 | (United States) Phillips Motorsports, Inc. | 13 | | | | | | | | DNS | | 13 | | | 7 |
| - | (United States) Robinson Racing | 74 | 16 | | | | | | | | | | | | 0 |
| - | (United Kingdom) Team Ascari | 24 | | | DNS | 17 | | | | | | | | | 0 |
| - | (United States) Phil Creighton Motorsports | 8 | | | | | | DNS | | | | | | | 0 |
| - | (United Kingdom) Project 2000 Raceworks | 67 | | | | | | | | | | | | DNQ | 0 |
| Pos. | Team | | SEB (United States) | CLT (United States) | SIL (United Kingdom) | NUR (Germany) | SON (United States) | MOS (Canada) | TEX (United States) | POR (United States) | ATL (United States) | LAG (United States) | LVS (United States) | ADE (Australia) | Pts. |

==== GTS Drivers' Championship ====
Bold - Pole position. F - Fastest lap. L - led a lap. M - led the most laps. * - Not awarded points.

| Pos. | Driver | Team | SEB (United States) | CLT (United States) | SIL (United Kingdom) | NUR (Germany) | SON (United States) | MOS (Canada) | TEX (United States) | POR (United States) | ATL (United States) | LAG (United States) | LVS (United States) | ADE (Australia) | Pts. |
|---|---|---|---|---|---|---|---|---|---|---|---|---|---|---|---|
| 1 | (Monaco) Olivier Beretta | (France) Viper Team Oreca | 1^{F} | **1** | **1^{F}** | **1^{F}** | **2*** | 1 | **2*** | **1** | 4^{F} | 1^{F} | **1^{F}** | **1** | 268 |
| 2 | (Austria) Karl Wendlinger | (France) Viper Team Oreca | 1 | **1^{F}** | **1** | **1** | **2*** | 1 | **2*** | **1^{F}** | 4 | 1 | **1** | **1** | 264 |
| 3 | (United States) Tommy Archer | (France) Viper Team Oreca | 2 | 3 | 2* | 5 | 1 | 3 | 3 | 2 | 2 | 3 | 2 | | 217 |
| 4 | (United States) David Donohue | (France) Viper Team Oreca | 2 | 3 | 2* | 5 | 1 | 3 | 3 | 2 | 5 | 3 | 2 | | 211 |
| 5 | (United States) Vic Rice | (United States) Roock Motorsport N. A. | 7* | 2 | 7 | 3 | 3 | 4 | 4 | 3 | 8* | 8* | 4 | | 147 |
| 5 | (United States) Vic Rice | (United States) Intersport Racing | | | | | | | | | | | | 4* | 147 |
| 6 | (United States) Andy Pilgrim | (United States) Corvette Racing | 5 | | | | | **2** | 1 | | 1 | **2** | 6 | | 131 |
| 7 | (United States) Zak Brown | (United States) Roock Motorsport N. A. | 8* | 2 | 7 | 3 | 3 | 4 | 4* | 3 | 8* | 8* | 4 | | 130 |
| 8 | (Canada) Ron Fellows | (United States) Corvette Racing | **6** | | | | | **2^{F}** | 1 | | **3** | **2** | 6 | | 125 |
| 9 | (France) Jean-Philippe Belloc | (France) Viper Team Oreca | 3 | | | 5 | | | | | 5 | | | 2 | 90 |
| 10 | (South Africa) Stephen Watson | (United Kingdom) Chamberlain Motorsport | | | | 2 | | | | | 7 | 5 | | 3 | 83 |
| 11 | (France) Dominique Dupuy | (France) Viper Team Oreca | 1 | | | | | | | | 5 | | | **1** | 80 |
| 12 | (United Kingdom) Justin Bell | (United States) Corvette Racing | **6** | | | | | | | | **3** | 4 | 3 | | 79 |
| 13 | (Belgium) Marc Duez | (France) Viper Team Oreca | 2 | | | **1** | | | | | 4 | | | | 78 |
| 14 | (United States) Kelly Collins | (United States) Corvette Racing | 5 | | | | | | | | 1 | 4 | | | 67 |
| 15 | (Venezuela) Milka Duno | (United Kingdom) Chamberlain Motorsport | | | | | | | | | 7 | 5 | | 3 | 57 |
| 16 | (Portugal) Ni Amorim | (France) Viper Team Oreca | 3 | | | | | | | | | | | 2^{L} | 51 |
| 17 | (France) Xavier Pompidou | (United Kingdom) Chamberlain Motorsport | | | | 2 | | | | | 7 | | | | 44 |
| 18 | (United States) Chris Kneifel | (United States) Corvette Racing | **6*** | | | | | | | | **3** | | 3 | | 43 |
| 19 | (United States) Charles Slater | (Germany) Konrad Motorsport | 4 | | | 6 | | | | | | | | | 41 |
| 20 | (Austria) Franz Konrad | (Germany) Konrad Motorsport | 4 | | 4 | | | | | | | | | | 39 |
| 21 | (United States) Mike Fitzgerald | (United States) Roock Motorsport N. A. | | | | | | | DNS | 3 | 6 | | | | 38 |
| 22 | (Germany) Hubert Haupt | (United States) Roock Motorsport N. A. | 7 | | 7 | 3 | | | | | | | | | 37 |
| 23 | (France) Franck Fréon | (United States) Corvette Racing | 5 | | | | | | | | 1 | | | | 30 |
| 24 | (Switzerland) Walter Brun | (United Kingdom) Chamberlain Motorsport | | | 6 | | | | | | | | 5 | | 29 |
| 25 | (Brazil) Thomas Erdos | (United Kingdom) Chamberlain Motorsport | | | | 2 | | | | | | | | | 26 |
| 25 | (Netherlands) Patrick Huisman | (France) Viper Team Oreca | | | | | | | | | 2 | | | | 26 |
| 25 | (France) Boris Derichebourg | (France) Viper Team Oreca | | | | | | | | | 2 | | | | 26 |
| 28 | (France) Anthony Beltoise | (France) Viper Team Oreca | 3 | | | | | | | | | | | | 24 |
| 29 | (United States) John Paul Jr. | (Germany) Konrad Motorsport | 4 | | | | | | | | | | | | 22 |
| 29 | (United States) John Paul Jr. | (United States) Patriot Motorsports | | | | | | | | | 9 | | | | 22 |
| 29 | (Germany) Gerold Ried | (Germany) Proton Competition | | | | 4 | | | | | | | | | 22 |
| 29 | (Germany) Christian Ried | (Germany) Proton Competition | | | | 4 | | | | | | | | | 22 |
| 32 | (France) Stéphane Ortelli | (Germany) Freisinger Motorsport | | | 3 | | | | | | | | | | 19 |
| 32 | (Germany) Wolfgang Kaufmann | (Germany) Freisinger Motorsport | | | 3 | | | | | | | | | | 19 |
| 32 | (United States) Spencer Trenery | (United States) Roock Motorsport N. A. | | | | | | | | | 6 | | | | 19 |
| 35 | (Canada) Bertrand Godin | (United States) DonMcGill.com Porsche Racing | | 4 | | | | | | | | | | | 17 |
| 35 | (United States) Sam Shalala | (United States) DonMcGill.com Porsche Racing | | 4 | | | | | | | | | | | 17 |
| 35 | (Germany) Jürgen von Gartzen | (Germany) Konrad Motorsport | | | 4 | | | | | | | | | | 17 |
| 35 | (United States) Martin Snow | (United States) Roock Motorsport N. A. | | | | | | | | | 8 | | | | 17 |
| 39 | (United Kingdom) Geoff Lister | (United Kingdom) BVB Motorsport | | | 5 | | | | | | | | | | 15 |
| 39 | (United Kingdom) Max Beaverbroock | (United Kingdom) BVB Motorsport | | | 5 | | | | | | | | | | 15 |
| 39 | (Belgium) Didier Defourny | (United Kingdom) Chamberlain Motorsport | | | | | | | | | | | 5 | | 15 |
| 42 | (Switzerland) Toni Seiler | (United Kingdom) Chamberlain Motorsport | | | 6 | | | | | | | | | | 14 |
| 42 | (United States) Tommy Kendall | (United States) Saleen/Allen Speedlab | | | | | | | | | | 6 | | | 14 |
| 42 | (United States) Terry Borcheller | (United States) Saleen/Allen Speedlab | | | | | | | | | | 6 | | | 14 |
| 42 | (United States) Ron Johnson | (United States) Saleen/Allen Speedlab | | | | | | | | | | 6 | | | 14 |
| 46 | (Canada) Greg Willkins | (Canada) Multimatic Motorsports | | | | | | DNS | | | | 7 | | | 13 |
| 46 | (Canada) David Lacey | (Canada) Multimatic Motorsports | | | | | | DNS | | | | 7 | | | 13 |
| 46 | (Netherlands) Tom Coronel | (Netherlands) Carsport Holland | | | | | | | | | | | 7 | | 13 |
| 49 | (Austria) Horst Felbermayr Jr. | (United Kingdom) Chamberlain Motorsport | | | 8 | | | | | | | | | | 12 |
| 49 | (Canada) Michael Culver | (United Kingdom) Chamberlain Motorsport | | | 8 | | | | | | | | | | 12 |
| - | (Australia) Ray Lintott | (United Kingdom) Chamberlain Motorsport | | | | | | | | | | | | 3* | 0 |
| - | (United States) Kevin Buckler | (United States) Intersport Racing | | | | | | | | | | | | 4* | 0 |
| - | (Austria) Mandfred Jurasz | (United States) Roock Motorsport N. A. | 8 | | | | | | | | | | | | 0 |
| - | (Austria) Mandfred Jurasz | (Germany) Konrad Motorsport | | | | 6 | | | | | | | | | 0 |
| - | (Belgium) Didier Defourny | (Germany) Konrad Motorsport | | | | 6 | | | | | | | | | 0 |
| - | (Germany) Claudia Hürtgen | (United States) Roock Motorsport N. A. | 7 | | | | | | | | | | | | 0 |
| - | (Netherlands) Mike Hezemans | (Netherlands) Carsport Holland | | | | | | | | | | | 7 | | 0 |
| - | (United States) Stephen Earle | (United States) Roock Motorsport N. A. | 8 | | | | | | | | | | | | 0 |
| - | (United States) Neil Hanneman | (United States) Patriot Motorsports | | | | | | | | | 9 | | | | 0 |
| - | (United States) Bret Parker | (United States) Patriot Motorsports | | | | | | | | | 9 | | | | 0 |
| - | (Germany) Jürgen Lorenz | (United States) Roock Motorsport N. A. | | | | | | | DNS | | | | | | 0 |
| Pos. | Driver | Team | SEB (United States) | CLT (United States) | SIL (United Kingdom) | NUR (Germany) | SON (United States) | MOS (Canada) | TEX (United States) | POR (United States) | ATL (United States) | LAG (United States) | LVS (United States) | ADE (Australia) | Pts. |

==== GTS Teams Championship ====
Teams only scored the points for their highest finishing entry in each race.

| Pos. | Team | No. | SEB (United States) | CLT (United States) | SIL (United Kingdom) | NUR (Germany) | SON (United States) | MOS (Canada) | TEX (United States) | POR (United States) | ATL (United States) | LAG (United States) | LVS (United States) | ADE (Australia) | Pts. |
|---|---|---|---|---|---|---|---|---|---|---|---|---|---|---|---|
| 1 | (France) Viper Team Oreca | 91 | 1 | **1** | **1** | **1** | **2** | 1 | **2** | **1** | 4 | 1 | **1** | **1** | 266 |
| 1 | (France) Viper Team Oreca | 92 | 2 | 3 | 2 | 5 | 1 | 3 | 3 | 2 | 2 | 3 | 2 | 2 | 266 |
| 1 | (France) Viper Team Oreca | 93 | 3 | | | | | | | | 5 | | | | 266 |
| 2 | (United States) Roock Motorsport N. A. | 08 | 7 | 2 | 7 | 3 | 3 | 4 | 4 | 3 | 8 | 8 | 4 | | 184 |
| 2 | (United States) Roock Motorsport N. A. | 09 | 8 | | | | | | DNS | | 6 | | | | 184 |
| 3 | (United States) Corvette Racing | 3 | **6** | | | | | **2** | 1 | | **3** | **2** | 6 | | 136 |
| 3 | (United States) Corvette Racing | 4 | 5 | | | | | | | | 1 | 4 | 3 | | 136 |
| 4 | (United Kingdom) Chamberlain Motorsport | 61 | | | 6 | 2 | | | | | 7 | 5 | 5 | 3 | 112 |
| 4 | (United Kingdom) Chamberlain Motorsport | 62 | | | 8 | | | | | | | | | | 112 |
| 5 | (Germany) Konrad Motorsport | 33 | 4 | | 4 | 6 | | | | | | | | | 58 |
| 6 | (Germany) Proton Competition | 35 | | | | 4 | | | | | | | | | 22 |
| 6 | (United States) Intersport Racing | 37 | | | | | | | | | | | | 4 | 22 |
| 8 | (Germany) Freisinger Motorsport | 49 | | | 3 | | | | | | | | | | 19 |
| 9 | (United States) DonMcGill.com Porsche Racing | 40 | | 4 | | | | | | | | | | | 17 |
| 10 | (United States) Patriot Motorsports | 11 | | | | | | | | | DNP | | | | 16 |
| 10 | (United States) Patriot Motorsports | 12 | | | | | | | | | 9 | | | | 16 |
| 11 | (United Kingdom) BVB Motorsport | 44 | | | 5 | | | | | | | | | | 15 |
| 12 | (United States) Saleen/Allen Speedlab | 55 | | | | | | | | | | 6 | | | 14 |
| 13 | (Canada) Multimatic Motorsports | 73 | | | | | | DNS | | | | 7 | | | 13 |
| 13 | (Netherlands) Carsport Holland | 25 | | | | | | | | | | | 7 | | 13 |
| Pos. | Team | | SEB (United States) | CLT (United States) | SIL (United Kingdom) | NUR (Germany) | SON (United States) | MOS (Canada) | TEX (United States) | POR (United States) | ATL (United States) | LAG (United States) | LVS (United States) | ADE (Australia) | Pts. |

==== GT Drivers' Championship ====
Bold - Pole position. F - Fastest lap. L - led a lap. M - led the most laps. * - Not awarded points.

| Pos. | Driver | Team | SEB (United States) | CLT (United States) | SIL (United Kingdom) | NUR (Germany) | SON (United States) | MOS (Canada) | TEX (United States) | POR (United States) | ATL (United States) | LAG (United States) | LVS (United States) | ADE (Australia) | Pts. |
|---|---|---|---|---|---|---|---|---|---|---|---|---|---|---|---|
| 1 | (Germany) Dirk Müller | (United States) Dick Barbour Racing | **1^{F}** | **10^{F}** | **4^{F}** | 1 | **1^{F}** | 13* | **3** | **11*** | 3^{F} | 10 | **2^{F}** | **1^{L}** | 223 |
| 2 | (Germany) Lucas Lühr | (United States) Dick Barbour Racing | **1** | **10** | **4** | 1 | **1** | 13* | **3** | **11*** | 3 | 10 | **2** | **1** | 216 |
| 3 | (Germany) Sascha Maassen | (United States) Dick Barbour Racing | 10 | 1 | 1 | **13*** | 2 | 3 | 2^{F} | 1 | 1 | **12*** | 1 | 9 | 212 |
| 3 | (France) Bob Wollek | (United States) Dick Barbour Racing | 10 | 1 | 1 | **13*** | 2 | 3 | 2 | 1 | 1 | **12*** | 1 | 9 | 212 |
| 5 | (United States) Randy Pobst | (United States) Alex Job Racing | 17* | 8 | 2 | 11 | 4 | **1^{F}** | 1 | 3 | **2** | 2^{F} | 13* | | 200 |
| 5 | (United States) Randy Pobst | (United States) White Lightning Racing | | | | | | | | | | | | 7 | 200 |
| 6 | (Belgium) Bruno Lambert | (United States) Alex Job Racing | 17* | 8 | 2 | 11 | 4 | **1** | 1 | 3 | **2** | 2 | 13 | | 187 |
| 7 | (United States) Brian Cunningham | (United States) Prototype Technology Group | 15* | 2 | 12 | 4 | 12 | 5 | 6 | 4 | 15* | 3 | 4 | 4 | 165 |
| 8 | (United Kingdom) Johnny Mowlem | (Australia) Skea Racing International | 2 | 5 | 7 | 2 | 10* | 7 | 5 | 5 | 16* | 13 | 5 | 8 | 162 |
| 9 | (United States) Cort Wagner | (United States) MCR/Aspen Knolls | 11 | 7 | 3 | 3 | 5 | 4 | 11 | 10* | 8 | | | | 156 |
| 9 | (United States) Cort Wagner | (United States) White Lightning Racing | | | | | | | | | | 4 | 9 | | 156 |
| 10 | (Germany) Hans-Joachim Stuck | (United States) Prototype Technology Group | 14 | 4 | 6 | 6 | DSQ | 2 | 7 | | 9 | 1 | 3 | 12* | 155 |
| 11 | (United States) David Murry | (Australia) Skea Racing International | 2 | 5 | 7 | 2 | 10 | 7 | 5 | 5 | 16* | 13* | 5 | | 148 |
| 11 | (United States) Boris Said | (United States) Prototype Technology Group | 14* | | 6 | 6 | DSQ | 2 | | 2 | 9 | 1 | 3 | 12 | 148 |
| 13 | (United States) Shane Lewis | (United States) MCR/Aspen Knolls | 11 | 7 | 3 | 3 | 5 | 4 | 11 | 10* | 8 | 6 | 15 | | 147 |
| 14 | (United States) Johannes van Overbeek | (United States) Prototype Technology Group | 14* | 4 | 6 | 6 | 3 | 14 | 7 | 2 | 9 | 15* | 10 | 12* | 136 |
| 15 | (United States) Mike Fitzgerald | (United States) The Racer's Group | 8 | | | | | | | | | | | | 125 |
| 15 | (United States) Mike Fitzgerald | (United States) Alex Job Racing | | 3 | 5 | | 6 | 6 | | | | | | | 125 |
| 15 | (United States) Mike Fitzgerald | (United States) White Lightning Racing | | | | | | | | | | 4 | 9 | 7 | 125 |
| 16 | (Sweden) Niclas Jönsson | (United States) Prototype Technology Group | | | 12 | 4 | 12* | | 6 | 4 | 15* | 3 | 4 | 4 | 121 |
| 17 | (United States) Robert Nagel | (United States) The Racer's Group | 8 | | | | | | | | | | | | 113 |
| 17 | (United States) Robert Nagel | (United States) Alex Job Racing | | 3 | 5 | 5 | 6 | 6 | | 6 | | | | | 113 |
| 18 | (United States) Peter Cunningham | (United States) Prototype Technology Group | 15* | 2 | 12 | 4 | 3 | 5 | | | 15* | 15* | 10 | | 97 |
| 19 | (United States) Doc Bundy | (Australia) Skea Racing International | | | 13 | 8 | 11 | 8* | 8 | 12 | 14* | 9 | 6 | 11 | 92 |
| 20 | (Canada) Kye Wankum | (Canada) Kyser Racing | | | 11 | 9 | | 11 | | | 11 | 7 | 11 | 10 | 85 |
| 21 | (Canada) Tony Burgess | (Germany) Seikel Motorsport | 16* | | 10 | 7 | 9 | 12 | | | 5 | 5 | 14 | | 79 |
| 21 | (United States) Grady Willingham | (Australia) Skea Racing International | 6 | 9 | | 8 | | 8 | | | | | | | 79 |
| 21 | (United States) Grady Willingham | (Germany) Seikel Motorsport | | | | | | | | | 5 | | | | 79 |
| 21 | (United States) Grady Willingham | (United States) Alex Job Racing | | | | | | | | | | | 8 | | 79 |
| 23 | (Australia) Rohan Skea | (Australia) Skea Racing International | 6 | 9 | 13 | 8 | 11 | | 8 | 12 | 14 | 9 | | 11 | 77 |
| 24 | (United States) Anthony Lazzaro | (United States) Alex Job Racing | | | | | | | 4 | | **2** | | | | 67 |
| 24 | (United States) Anthony Lazzaro | (United States) Prototype Technology Group | | | | | | | | | | | | 3 | 67 |
| 25 | (Canada) Greg Doff | (Canada) Kyser Racing | | | 11 | 9 | 14 | 11 | | | 11 | 7 | | | 61 |
| 26 | (United States) Joe Foster | (United States) Alex Job Racing | | | | 5 | | | | | | | | | 58 |
| 26 | (United States) Joe Foster | (Canada) Kyser Racing | | | | | 14 | | | | 11 | | 11 | 10 | 58 |
| 27 | (United States) Kevin Buckler | (United States) The Racer's Group | 8 | | | | 13 | 10 | | 7 | 12 | 14 | 12 | | 55 |
| 28 | (United States) Gunnar Jeannette | (United States) White Lightning Racing | 13 | 6 | | | 7 | | 9 | | 10 | | | | 53 |
| 28 | (France) Christophe Bouchut | (Switzerland) Team LR Organization | 5 | | 8 | | | | | | | | | | 53 |
| 28 | (France) Christophe Bouchut | (Germany) Seikel Motorsport | | | | | | | | | | 5 | 14 | | 53 |
| 30 | (United States) Jennifer Tumminelli | (United States) The Racer's Group | | | | | 8 | 9 | | | | | | | 46 |
| 30 | (United States) Jennifer Tumminelli | (United States) Dick Barbour Racing | | | | | | | 10 | 8 | | | | | 46 |
| 30 | (United States) Terry Borcheller | (United States) Dick Barbour Racing | | | | | | | 10 | 8 | | | | | 46 |
| 30 | (United States) Terry Borcheller | (United States) Prototype Technology Group | | | | | | | | | | | | 3 | 46 |
| 32 | (United States) Robert Orcutt | (United States) The Racer's Group | | | | | | 9 | | | | 8 | | 5 | 44 |
| 33 | (United Kingdom) Richard Dean | (Australia) Skea Racing International | | | | | | | | | 14 | 9 | 6 | 8 | 42 |
| 34 | (Italy) Stefano Buttiero | (Germany) Seikel Motorsport | | | | 7 | 9 | 12 | | 12 | | | | | 38 |
| 35 | (United States) Craig Stanton | (United States) Reiser Callas Rennsport | 3 | | | | | | | | | | | | 37 |
| 35 | (United States) Craig Stanton | (Canada) Kyser Racing | | | | | | | | | | 7 | | | 37 |
| 36 | (United States) Darren Law | (United States) Prototype Technology Group | 15 | | | | | | | | | | | | 36 |
| 36 | (United States) Darren Law | (United States) G & W Motorsports | | | | | | | | | 4 | | | | 36 |
| 36 | (United States) Darren Law | (United States) MCR/Aspen Knolls | | | | | | | | | | 6 | 15 | | 36 |
| 37 | (Italy) Luca Riccitelli | (Germany) RWS Red Bull Motorsport | 4 | | 9 | | | | | | | | | | 33 |
| 38 | (United States) Philip Collin | (Germany) Seikel Motorsport | 16 | | | | | | | | | | | | 32 |
| 38 | (United States) Philip Collin | (United States) The Racer's Group | | | | | | 10 | | 7 | 12 | 14 | 12 | | 32 |
| 39 | (United Kingdom) Ian James | (United States) MCR/Nygmatech | 7 | 11 | | | | | | | | | | | 27 |
| 39 | (Portugal) Joăo Barbosa | (United States) MCR/Nygmatech | 7 | 11 | | | | | | | | | | | 27 |
| 39 | (United States) Leo Hindery | (United States) MCR/Nygmatech | 12 | | | | | | | | | | | | 27 |
| 39 | (United States) Leo Hindery | (United States) Orbit | | | | | | | | | 7 | 11 | | | 27 |
| 39 | (United States) Peter Baron | (United States) MCR/Nygmatech | 12 | | | | | | | | | | | | 27 |
| 39 | (United States) Peter Baron | (United States) Orbit | | | | | | | | | 7 | 11 | | | 27 |
| 43 | (Germany) Christian Menzel | (United States) Dick Barbour Racing | | | | | | | | | | | | 2 | 26 |
| 43 | (Canada) John Graham | (United States) Dick Barbour Racing | | | | | | | | | | | | 2 | 26 |
| 45 | (United States) Tom McGlynn | (United States) The Racer's Group | | | | | | | | | | 8 | 7 | | 25 |
| 46 | (United States) Michael Petersen | (United States) White Lightning Racing | | | | | 7 | | 9 | | | | | | 24 |
| 46 | (United States) Hurley Haywood | (United States) Reiser Callas Rennsport | 3 | | | | | | | | | | | | 24 |
| 48 | (United States) Kimberly Hiskey | (United States) Alex Job Racing | | | | | | | | 9 | | | 8 | | 23 |
| 49 | (Mexico) Randy Wars | (United States) Dick Barbour Racing | | | | | | | 10 | 8 | 13 | | | 2 | 22 |
| 49 | (Austria) Philipp Peter | (Germany) RWS Red Bull Motorsport | 4 | | | | | | | | | | | | 22 |
| 49 | (United States) John Morton | (United States) G & W Motorsports | | | | | | | | | 4 | | | | 22 |
| 49 | (United States) Michael Schrom | (United States) G & W Motorsports | | | | | | | | | 4 | | | | 22 |
| 49 | (United States) Bill Auberlen | (United States) Prototype Technology Group | | | | | | | | | | | | 4 | 22 |
| 54 | (Italy) Angelo Zadra | (Switzerland) Team LR Organization | 5 | | | | | | | | | | | | 20 |
| 54 | (United States) Peter Argetsinger | (United States) Alex Job Racing | | | | 5 | | | | | | | | | 20 |
| 54 | (United States) Kurt Mathewson | (Germany) Seikel Motorsport | 16* | | | | | | | | 5 | | | | 20 |
| 54 | (Australia) Christian D'Agostin | (United States) The Racer's Group | | | | | | | | | | | | 5 | 20 |
| 58 | (United States) Lloyd Hawkins | (Australia) Skea Racing International | 6 | | | | | | | | | | | | 19 |
| 58 | (United States) Cindi Lux | (United States) G & W Motorsports | | | | | | | | | 6 | | | | 19 |
| 58 | (United Kingdom) Divina Galica | (United States) G & W Motorsports | | | | | | | | | 6 | | | | 19 |
| 58 | (United States) Belinda Endress | (United States) G & W Motorsports | | | | | | | | | 6 | | | | 19 |
| 58 | (Spain) Francesc Gutiérrez | (Switzerland) Haberthur Racing | | | | | | | | | | | | 6 | 19 |
| 58 | (France) Patrick Vuillaume | (Switzerland) Haberthur Racing | | | | | | | | | | | | 6 | 19 |
| 58 | (Austria) Manfred Jurasz | (Switzerland) Haberthur Racing | | | | | | | | | | | | 6 | 19 |
| 65 | (United States) Tim Robertson | (United States) MCR/Nygmatech | 7 | | | | | | | | | | | | 18 |
| 65 | (Italy) Gabrio Rosa | (Germany) Seikel Motorsport | | | | 7 | | | | | | | | | 18 |
| 65 | (United States) Gian Luigi Buitoni | (United States) Orbit | | | | | | | | | 7 | | | | 18 |
| 68 | (United States) Mike Conte | (United States) Alex Job Racing | 17* | | | | | | 4 | | | | | | 17 |
| 68 | (United States) Bob Mazzuoccola | (United States) MCR/Aspen Knolls | 11* | | | | | | | | 8 | | | | 17 |
| 70 | (United States) Dave Dullum | (United States) MCR/Nygmatech | 9 | | | | | | | | | | | | 16 |
| 70 | (United States) James McCormick | (United States) MCR/Nygmatech | 9 | | | | | | | | | | | | 16 |
| 70 | (Germany) Georg Silbermayr | (Canada) Kyser Racing | | | | 9 | | | | | | | | | 16 |
| 73 | (Germany) André Ahrlé | (United States) Roock Motorsport N. A. | | | | 10 | | | | | | | | | 15 |
| 73 | (Germany) Jürgen Lorenz | (United States) Roock Motorsport N. A. | | | | 10 | | | | | | | | | 15 |
| 73 | (United States) Wayne Jackson | (United States) White Lightning Racing | | | | | | | | | 10 | | | | 15 |
| 73 | (United States) Joe Policastro Jr. | (United States) White Lightning Racing | | | | | | | | | 10 | | | | 15 |
| 73 | (Canada) Jeffrey Pabst | (Canada) Kyser Racing | | | | | | | | | | | | 10 | 15 |
| 78 | (United States) Wade Gaughran | (United States) White Lightning Racing | | | | | | | | 6 | | | | | 14 |
| 78 | (United States) Quentin Wahl | (United States) White Lightning Racing | | 6 | | | | | | | | | | | 14 |
| 80 | (France) Marc Sourd | (France) Noël del Bello Racing | | | | 12 | | | | | | | | | 13 |
| 80 | (France) Roland Bervillé | (France) Noël del Bello Racing | | | | 12 | | | | | | | | | 13 |
| 80 | (United States) Rick Polk | (United States) The Racer's Group | | | | | | | | | | | 7 | | 13 |
| 83 | (United States) Rod McLeod | (United States) White Lightning Racing | 13 | | | | | | | | | | | | 12 |
| 83 | (France) Michel Ligonnet | (Switzerland) Team LR Organization | | | 8 | | | | | | | | | | 12 |
| 83 | (United States) Steve Ariana | (United States) The Racer's Group | | | | | 8 | | | | | | | | 12 |
| 86 | (United States) Doug Hebenthal | (United States) Alex Job Racing | | | | | | | | 9 | | | | | 11 |
| 86 | (Austria) Hans-Jörg Hofer | (Germany) RWS Red Bull Motorsport | | | 9 | | | | | | | | | | 11 |
| 88 | (Canada) Rudy Bartling | (Canada) Kyser Racing | | | | | | 11 | | | | | | | 10 |
| 89 | (Belgium) Michel Neugarten | (Germany) Seikel Motorsport | | | 10 | | | | | | | | | | 9 |
| - | (Canada) Joel Reiser | (United States) Reiser Callas Rennsport | 3* | | | | | | | | | | | | 0 |
| - | (Austria) Dieter Quester | (Germany) RWS Red Bull Motorsport | 4* | | 9* | | | | | | | | | | 0 |
| - | (United States) Darren Palmer | (United States) The Racer's Group | | | | | | | | | | | | 5* | 0 |
| - | (United States) Dale White | (United States) White Lightning Racing | | | | | 7* | | 9* | | | | | | 0 |
| - | (United States) Kurt Baumann | (United States) MCR/Nygmatech | 9* | | | | | | | | | | | | 0 |
| - | (Australia) Des Wall | (Australia) Skea Racing International | | | | | | | | | | | | 11* | 0 |
| - | (United States) Tony Kester | (United States) MCR/Nygmatech | 12* | | | | | | | | | | | | 0 |
| - | (France) Noël del Bello | (France) Noël del Bello Racing | | | | 12* | | | | | | | | | 0 |
| - | (United States) Jim Michaelian | (United States) The Racer's Group | | | | | | | | | 12* | | | | 0 |
| - | (United States) Michael Lauer | (United States) White Lightning Racing | 13* | | | | | | | | | | | | 0 |
| - | (United States) Rick Knoop | (United States) The Racer's Group | | | | | 13* | | | | | | | | 0 |
| - | (United States) Paul Newman | (United States) Dick Barbour Racing | | | | | | | | | 13* | | | | 0 |
| - | (United States) Mike Brockman | (United States) Dick Barbour Racing | | | | | | | | | 13* | | | | 0 |
| - | (United States) Brian Simo | (United States) Prototype Technology Group | | | | | | 14* | | | | | | | 0 |
| Pos. | Driver | Team | SEB (United States) | CLT (United States) | SIL (United Kingdom) | NUR (Germany) | SON (United States) | MOS (Canada) | TEX (United States) | POR (United States) | ATL (United States) | LAG (United States) | LVS (United States) | ADE (Australia) | Pts. |

Sascha Maasen and Bob Wollek were deducted 11 and 10 points respectively per commissioners decision.

==== GT Teams Championship ====
Teams only scored the points for their highest finishing entry in each race.

| Pos. | Team | No. | SEB (United States) | CLT (United States) | SIL (United Kingdom) | NUR (Germany) | SON (United States) | MOS (Canada) | TEX (United States) | POR (United States) | ATL (United States) | LAG (United States) | LVS (United States) | ADE (Australia) | Pts. |
|---|---|---|---|---|---|---|---|---|---|---|---|---|---|---|---|
| 1 | (United States) Dick Barbour Racing | 5 | **1** | **10** | **4** | 1 | **1** | 13 | **3** | **11** | 3 | 10 | **2** | **1** | 266 |
| 1 | (United States) Dick Barbour Racing | 15 | | | | | | | 10 | 8 | 13 | | | 2 | 266 |
| 1 | (United States) Dick Barbour Racing | 51 | 10 | 1 | 1 | **13** | 2 | 3 | 2 | 1 | 1 | **12** | 1 | 9 | 266 |
| 2 | (United States) Alex Job Racing | 22 | | 3 | 5 | 5 | 6 | 6 | 4 | 9 | | | 8 | | 205 |
| 2 | (United States) Alex Job Racing | 23 | 17 | 8 | 2 | 11 | 4 | **1** | 1 | 3 | **2** | 2 | 13 | | 205 |
| 3 | (United States) Prototype Technology Group | 6 | 14 | 4 | 6 | 6 | 3 | 14 | | | | 15 | 10 | 3 | 202 |
| 3 | (United States) Prototype Technology Group | 7 | | | | | DSQ | 2 | 7 | 2 | 9 | 1 | 3 | 12 | 202 |
| 3 | (United States) Prototype Technology Group | 10 | 15 | 2 | 12 | 4 | 12 | 5 | 6 | 4 | 15 | 3 | 4 | 4 | 202 |
| 4 | (Australia) Skea Racing International | 70 | 2 | 5 | 7 | 2 | 10 | 7 | 5 | 5 | 16 | 13 | 5 | 8 | 166 |
| 4 | (Australia) Skea Racing International | 71 | 6 | 9 | 13 | 8 | 11 | 8 | 8 | 12 | 14 | 9 | 6 | 11 | 166 |
| 5 | (United States) Michael Colucci Racing (United States) MCR/Aspen Knolls (United States) MCR/Nygmatech | 21 | 11 | 7 | 3 | 3 | 5 | 4 | 11 | 10 | 8 | 6 | 15 | | 151 |
| 5 | (United States) Michael Colucci Racing (United States) MCR/Aspen Knolls (United States) MCR/Nygmatech | 87 | 7 | | | | | | | | | | | | 151 |
| 5 | (United States) Michael Colucci Racing (United States) MCR/Aspen Knolls (United States) MCR/Nygmatech | 88 | 12 | | | | | | | | | | | | 151 |
| 5 | (United States) Michael Colucci Racing (United States) MCR/Aspen Knolls (United States) MCR/Nygmatech | 89 | 9 | 11 | | | | | | | | | | | 151 |
| 6 | (United States) White Lightning Racing | 30 | 13 | 6 | | | 7 | | 9 | 6 | 10 | 4 | 9 | 7 | 125 |
| 7 | (United States) The Racer's Group | 66 | 8 | | | | 13 | 10 | | 7 | 12 | 14 | 12 | 5 | 112 |
| 7 | (United States) The Racer's Group | 67 | | | | | 8 | 9 | | | | 8 | 7 | | 112 |
| 8 | (Canada) Kyser Racing | 69 | | | 11 | 9 | 14 | 11 | | | 11 | 7 | 11 | 10 | 91 |
| 9 | (Germany) Seikel Motorsport | 52/68 | 16 | | 10 | 7 | 9 | 12 | | | 5 | 5 | 14 | | 88 |
| 10 | (Germany) RWS Red Bull Motorsport | 07 | 4 | | 9 | | | | | | | | | | 33 |
| 11 | (Switzerland) Team LR Organization | 41 | 5 | | 8 | | | | | | | | | | 32 |
| 12 | (United States) Orbit | 34 | | | | | | | | | 7 | 11 | | | 27 |
| 13 | (United States) Reiser Callas Rennsport | 02 | 3 | | | | | | | | | | | | 24 |
| 14 | (United States) G & W Motorsports | 80 | | | | | | | | | 4 | | | | 22 |
| 14 | (United States) G & W Motorsports | 81 | | | | | | | | | 6 | | | | 22 |
| 15 | (Switzerland) Haberthur Racing | 8 | | | | | | | | | | | | 6 | 19 |
| 16 | (United States) Roock Motorsport N. A. | 9 | | | | 10 | | | | | | | | | 15 |
| 17 | (France) Noël del Bello Racing | 56 | | | | 12 | | | | | | | | | 13 |
| Pos. | Team | | SEB (United States) | CLT (United States) | SIL (United Kingdom) | NUR (Germany) | SON (United States) | MOS (Canada) | TEX (United States) | POR (United States) | ATL (United States) | LAG (United States) | LVS (United States) | ADE (Australia) | Pts. |

== Bibliography ==
- Baker, James (2000). American Le Mans Series Yearbook 2000. Haymarket Specialist Publications. ISBN 978-0860249719.
