= 2000 Monterey Sports Car Championships =

Laguna Seca Raceway

The 2000 GlobalCenter Sports Car Championships presented by Honda was the tenth round of the 2000 American Le Mans Series season. It took place at Laguna Seca Raceway, California, on October 15, 2000.

== Official results ==
Class winners in bold.

| Pos | Class | No | Team | Drivers | Chassis | Tyre | Laps |
| Pos | Class | No | Team | Drivers | Engine | Tyre | Laps |
|---|---|---|---|---|---|---|---|
| 1 | **LMP** | **77** | **(Germany) Audi Sport North America** | **(Italy) Rinaldo Capello (United Kingdom) Allan McNish** | **Audi R8** | M | **119** |
| 1 | **LMP** | **77** | **(Germany) Audi Sport North America** | **(Italy) Rinaldo Capello (United Kingdom) Allan McNish** | **Audi 3.6L Turbo V8** | M | **119** |
| 2 | LMP | 78 | (Germany) Audi Sport North America | (Germany) Frank Biela (Italy) Emanuele Pirro | Audi R8 | M | 119 |
| 2 | LMP | 78 | (Germany) Audi Sport North America | (Germany) Frank Biela (Italy) Emanuele Pirro | Audi 3.6L Turbo V8 | M | 119 |
| 3 | LMP | 42 | (Germany) BMW Motorsport (Germany) Schnitzer Motorsport | (Germany) Jörg Müller (Finland) JJ Lehto | BMW V12 LMR | M | 119 |
| 3 | LMP | 42 | (Germany) BMW Motorsport (Germany) Schnitzer Motorsport | (Germany) Jörg Müller (Finland) JJ Lehto | BMW S70 6.0L V12 | M | 119 |
| 4 | LMP | 43 | (Germany) BMW Motorsport (Germany) Schnitzer Motorsport | (France) Jean-Marc Gounon (United States) Bill Auberlen | BMW V12 LMR | M | 116 |
| 4 | LMP | 43 | (Germany) BMW Motorsport (Germany) Schnitzer Motorsport | (France) Jean-Marc Gounon (United States) Bill Auberlen | BMW S70 6.0L V12 | M | 116 |
| 5 | LMP | 36 | (United States) Johansson-Matthews Racing | (Sweden) Stefan Johansson (United Kingdom) Guy Smith | Reynard 2KQ-LM | Y | 116 |
| 5 | LMP | 36 | (United States) Johansson-Matthews Racing | (Sweden) Stefan Johansson (United Kingdom) Guy Smith | Judd GV4 4.0L V10 | Y | 116 |
| 6 | LMP | 37 | (United States) Intersport Racing | (United States) Jon Field (United States) Rick Sutherland | Lola B2K/10 | Y | 112 |
| 6 | LMP | 37 | (United States) Intersport Racing | (United States) Jon Field (United States) Rick Sutherland | Judd GV4 4.0L V10 | Y | 112 |
| 7 | LMP | 19 | (United States) Team Cadillac | (South Africa) Wayne Taylor (Italy) Max Angelelli | Cadillac Northstar LMP | P | 111 |
| 7 | LMP | 19 | (United States) Team Cadillac | (South Africa) Wayne Taylor (Italy) Max Angelelli | Cadillac Northstar 4.0L Turbo V8 | P | 111 |
| 8 | **GTS** | **91** | **(France) Viper Team Oreca** | **(Monaco) Olivier Beretta (Austria) Karl Wendlinger** | **Dodge Viper GTS-R** | M | **109** |
| 8 | **GTS** | **91** | **(France) Viper Team Oreca** | **(Monaco) Olivier Beretta (Austria) Karl Wendlinger** | **Dodge 8.0L V10** | M | **109** |
| 9 | GTS | 3 | (United States) Corvette Racing | (United States) Andy Pilgrim (Canada) Ron Fellows | Chevrolet Corvette C5-R | G | 109 |
| 9 | GTS | 3 | (United States) Corvette Racing | (United States) Andy Pilgrim (Canada) Ron Fellows | Chevrolet 7.0L V8 | G | 109 |
| 10 | GTS | 92 | (France) Viper Team Oreca | (United States) Tommy Archer (United States) David Donohue | Dodge Viper GTS-R | M | 109 |
| 10 | GTS | 92 | (France) Viper Team Oreca | (United States) Tommy Archer (United States) David Donohue | Dodge 8.0L V10 | M | 109 |
| 11 | LMP | 56 | (United States) Martin Snow Racing | (United States) Gunnar Jeannette (United States) Martin Snow | Lola B2K/40 | A | 108 |
| 11 | LMP | 56 | (United States) Martin Snow Racing | (United States) Gunnar Jeannette (United States) Martin Snow | Nissan (AER) VQL 3.0L V6 | A | 108 |
| 12 | LMP | 28 | (Germany) Konrad Motorsport | (Austria) Franz Konrad (United States) Charles Slater | Lola B2K/10 | G | 107 |
| 12 | LMP | 28 | (Germany) Konrad Motorsport | (Austria) Franz Konrad (United States) Charles Slater | Ford (Roush) 6.0L V8 | G | 107 |
| 13 | GTS | 4 | (United States) Corvette Racing | (United Kingdom) Justin Bell (United States) Kelly Collins | Chevrolet Corvette C5-R | G | 105 |
| 13 | GTS | 4 | (United States) Corvette Racing | (United Kingdom) Justin Bell (United States) Kelly Collins | Chevrolet 7.0L V8 | G | 105 |
| 14 | **GT** | **7** | **(United States) Prototype Technology Group** | **(United States) Boris Said (Germany) Hans Joachim Stuck** | **BMW M3** | Y | **105** |
| 14 | **GT** | **7** | **(United States) Prototype Technology Group** | **(United States) Boris Said (Germany) Hans Joachim Stuck** | **BMW 3.2L I6** | Y | **105** |
| 15 | GTS | 61 | (United Kingdom) Chamberlain Motorsport | (Venezuela) Milka Duno (South Africa) Stephen Watson | Chrysler Viper GTS-R | M | 104 |
| 15 | GTS | 61 | (United Kingdom) Chamberlain Motorsport | (Venezuela) Milka Duno (South Africa) Stephen Watson | Chrysler 8.0L V10 | M | 104 |
| 16 | GT | 23 | (United States) Alex Job Racing | (United States) Randy Pobst (Belgium) Bruno Lambert | Porsche 911 GT3-R | M | 104 |
| 16 | GT | 23 | (United States) Alex Job Racing | (United States) Randy Pobst (Belgium) Bruno Lambert | Porsche 3.6L Flat-6 | M | 104 |
| 17 | GT | 10 | (United States) Prototype Technology Group | (United States) Brian Cunningham (Sweden) Niclas Jönsson | BMW M3 | Y | 104 |
| 17 | GT | 10 | (United States) Prototype Technology Group | (United States) Brian Cunningham (Sweden) Niclas Jönsson | BMW 3.2L I6 | Y | 104 |
| 18 | GT | 30 | (United States) White Lightning Racing (United States) Petersen Motorsports | (United States) Cort Wagner (United States) Mike Fitzgerald | Porsche 911 GT3-R | M | 103 |
| 18 | GT | 30 | (United States) White Lightning Racing (United States) Petersen Motorsports | (United States) Cort Wagner (United States) Mike Fitzgerald | Porsche 3.6L Flat-6 | M | 103 |
| 19 | GT | 52 | (Germany) Seikel Motorsport | (Canada) Tony Burgess (France) Christophe Bouchut | Porsche 911 GT3-R | Y | 103 |
| 19 | GT | 52 | (Germany) Seikel Motorsport | (Canada) Tony Burgess (France) Christophe Bouchut | Porsche 3.6L Flat-6 | Y | 103 |
| 20 | GT | 21 | (United States) MCR/Aspen Knolls | (United States) Shane Lewis (United States) Darren Law | Porsche 911 GT3-R | P | 102 |
| 20 | GT | 21 | (United States) MCR/Aspen Knolls | (United States) Shane Lewis (United States) Darren Law | Porsche 3.6L Flat-6 | P | 102 |
| 21 | GT | 69 | (Canada) Kyser Racing | (Canada) Kye Wankum (Canada) Greg Doff (United States) Craig Stanton | Porsche 911 GT3-R | P | 100 |
| 21 | GT | 69 | (Canada) Kyser Racing | (Canada) Kye Wankum (Canada) Greg Doff (United States) Craig Stanton | Porsche 3.6L Flat-6 | P | 100 |
| 22 | GT | 67 | (United States) The Racer's Group | (United States) Robert Orcutt (United States) Tom McGlynn | Porsche 911 GT3-R | P | 100 |
| 22 | GT | 67 | (United States) The Racer's Group | (United States) Robert Orcutt (United States) Tom McGlynn | Porsche 3.6L Flat-6 | P | 100 |
| 23 DNF | LMP | 2 | (United States) Panoz Motor Sports | (United States) Johnny O'Connell (Japan) Hiroki Katou | Panoz LMP-1 Roadster-S | M | 99 |
| 23 DNF | LMP | 2 | (United States) Panoz Motor Sports | (United States) Johnny O'Connell (Japan) Hiroki Katou | Élan 6L8 6.0L V8 | M | 99 |
| 24 DNF | LMP | 0 | (Italy) Team Rafanelli SRL | (Italy) Mimmo Schiattarella (Belgium) Didier de Radiguès | Lola B2K/10 | M | 98 |
| 24 DNF | LMP | 0 | (Italy) Team Rafanelli SRL | (Italy) Mimmo Schiattarella (Belgium) Didier de Radiguès | Judd (Rafanelli) GV4 4.0L V10 | M | 98 |
| 25 | GT | 71 | (Australia) Skea Racing International | (Australia) Rohan Skea (United States) Doc Bundy (United Kingdom) Richard Dean | Porsche 911 GT3-R | P | 98 |
| 25 | GT | 71 | (Australia) Skea Racing International | (Australia) Rohan Skea (United States) Doc Bundy (United Kingdom) Richard Dean | Porsche 3.6L Flat-6 | P | 98 |
| 26 | GTS | 55 | (United States) Saleen/Allen Speedlab | (United States) Tommy Kendall (United States) Terry Borcheller (United States) Ron Johnson | Saleen S7-R | P | 97 |
| 26 | GTS | 55 | (United States) Saleen/Allen Speedlab | (United States) Tommy Kendall (United States) Terry Borcheller (United States) Ron Johnson | Ford 7.0L V8 | P | 97 |
| 27 | GT | 5 | (United States) Dick Barbour Racing | (Germany) Dirk Müller (Germany) Lucas Luhr | Porsche 911 GT3-R | M | 96 |
| 27 | GT | 5 | (United States) Dick Barbour Racing | (Germany) Dirk Müller (Germany) Lucas Luhr | Porsche 3.6L Flat-6 | M | 96 |
| 28 | GT | 34 | (United States) Orbit | (United States) Leo Hindery (United States) Peter Baron | Porsche 911 GT3-R | D | 96 |
| 28 | GT | 34 | (United States) Orbit | (United States) Leo Hindery (United States) Peter Baron | Porsche 3.6L Flat-6 | D | 96 |
| 29 | GT | 51 | (United States) Dick Barbour Racing | (Germany) Sascha Maassen (France) Bob Wollek | Porsche 911 GT3-R | M | 93 |
| 29 | GT | 51 | (United States) Dick Barbour Racing | (Germany) Sascha Maassen (France) Bob Wollek | Porsche 3.6L Flat-6 | M | 93 |
| 30 DNF | GTS | 73 | (Canada) Multimatic Motorsports (Canada) Doncaster Racing | (Canada) Greg Wilkins (Canada) David Lacey | Porsche 911 GT2 | P | 84 |
| 30 DNF | GTS | 73 | (Canada) Multimatic Motorsports (Canada) Doncaster Racing | (Canada) Greg Wilkins (Canada) David Lacey | Porsche 3.6L Turbo Flat-6 | P | 84 |
| 31 DNF | LMP | 1 | (United States) Panoz Motor Sports | (Australia) David Brabham (Denmark) Jan Magnussen | Panoz LMP-1 Roadster-S | M | 66 |
| 31 DNF | LMP | 1 | (United States) Panoz Motor Sports | (Australia) David Brabham (Denmark) Jan Magnussen | Élan 6L8 6.0L V8 | M | 66 |
| 32 DNF | GT | 70 | (Australia) Skea Racing International | (United Kingdom) Johnny Mowlem (United States) David Murry | Porsche 911 GT3-R | P | 36 |
| 32 DNF | GT | 70 | (Australia) Skea Racing International | (United Kingdom) Johnny Mowlem (United States) David Murry | Porsche 3.6L Flat-6 | P | 36 |
| 33 DNF | GT | 66 | (United States) The Racer's Group | (United States) Kevin Buckler (United States) Philip Collin | Porsche 911 GT3-R | P | 29 |
| 33 DNF | GT | 66 | (United States) The Racer's Group | (United States) Kevin Buckler (United States) Philip Collin | Porsche 3.6L Flat-6 | P | 29 |
| 34 DNF | LMP | 13 | (United States) Phillips Motorsports | (United States) Mel Hawkins (United States) Steven Knight | Lola B2K/40 | A | 5 |
| 34 DNF | LMP | 13 | (United States) Phillips Motorsports | (United States) Mel Hawkins (United States) Steven Knight | Nissan (AER) VQL 3.0L V6 | A | 5 |
| 35 DNF | GTS | 08 | (United States) Roock Motorsport North America | (United States) Zak Brown (United States) Vic Rice | Porsche 911 GT2 | Y | 3 |
| 35 DNF | GTS | 08 | (United States) Roock Motorsport North America | (United States) Zak Brown (United States) Vic Rice | Porsche 3.8L Turbo Flat-6 | Y | 3 |
| 36 DNF | GT | 6 | (United States) Prototype Technology Group | (United States) Peter Cunningham (United States) Johannes van Overbeek | BMW M3 | Y | 1 |
| 36 DNF | GT | 6 | (United States) Prototype Technology Group | (United States) Peter Cunningham (United States) Johannes van Overbeek | BMW 3.2L I6 | Y | 1 |

== Statistics ==
- Pole Position: Rinaldo Capello - #77 Audi Sport North America - 1:15.028
- Fastest Lap: Allan McNish - #77 Audi Sport North America - 1:16.280
- Distance: 428.604 km
- Average Speed: 154.766 km/h

American Le Mans Series
| Previous race: 2000 Petit Le Mans | 2000 season | Next race: 2000 Grand Prix of Las Vegas |
