= 2013 SportsCar Grand Prix =

Canadian Tire Motorsport Park

The 2013 Mobil 1 SportsCar Grand Prix was an auto racing event held at Canadian Tire Motorsports Park, Bowmanville, Ontario, Canada from July 19–21, 2013 The race was the fifth round of the 2013 American Le Mans Series season. Muscle Milk Pickett Racing, with drivers Klaus Graf and Lucas Luhr, extended their streak of season victories to four by earning a win with a four lap gap over second place and P2 class winners Level 5 Motorsports. CORE Autosport led the PC category, while Corvette Racing scored their third victory of the season in the GT class. Alex Job Racing won the GTC category, two weeks after badly damaging their car at the previous event in Lime Rock.

== Background ==
=== Preview ===
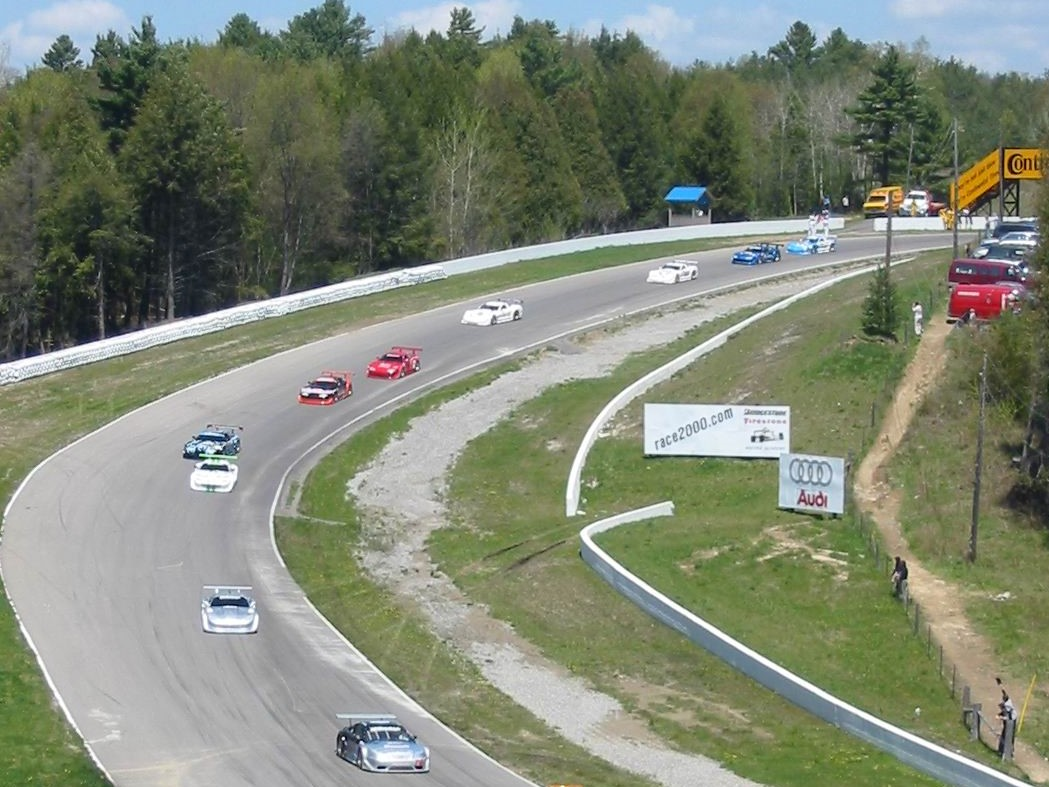
Canadian Tire Motorsports Park, where the race was held.

American Le Mans Series (ALMS) president Scott Atherton confirmed the race was part of the schedule for the 2013 American Le Mans Series schedule in October 2012. It was the fifteenth consecutive year the event was held as part of the American Le Mans Series. The 2013 Mobil 1 SportsCar Grand Prix was the fifth of ten scheduled sports car races of 2013 American Le Mans Series. The race was held at the ten-turn 2.459 mi (3.957 km) Canadian Tire Motorsports Park in Bowmanville, Ontario, Canada on July 21, 2013.

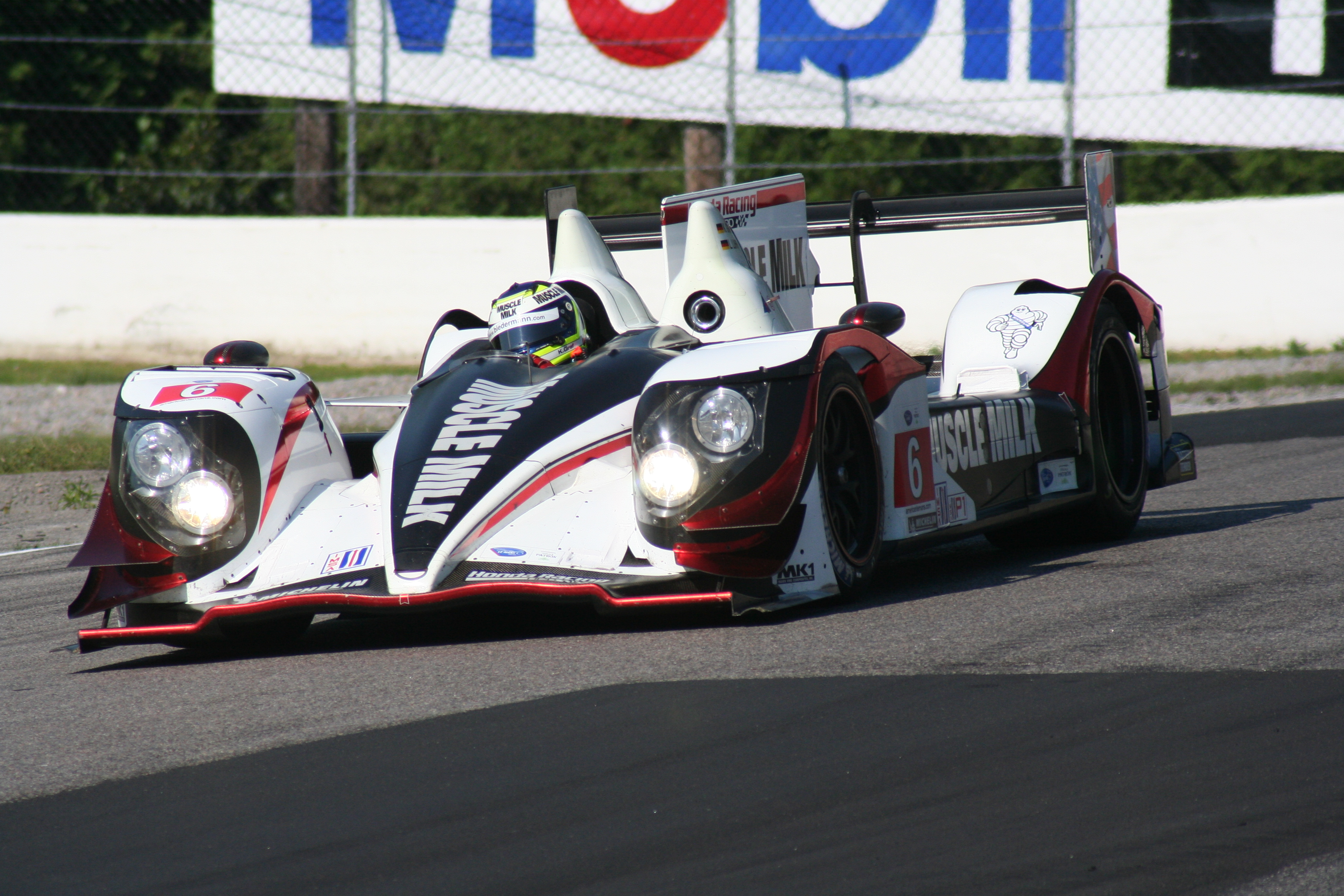
Muscle Milk Pickett Racing HPD ARX-03a - Winner 2013 Mobil 1 SportsCar Grand Prix

== Qualifying ==
In qualifying for the PC category, a crash by Mike Gausch forced the session to be stopped. Due to not completing a minimum of ten minutes, the qualifying results for PC were nullified and the grid order was set by championship points. As a result of PC cars requiring a separate grid order, the final race grid was altered so that cars in the same category were grouped together, even if outqualified by a car from another class.

=== Qualifying result ===
Pole position winners in each class are marked in bold.

Pos	Class	Team	Driver	Lap Time	Gap	Grid
1	**P1**	**#6 Muscle Milk Pickett Racing**	**Lucas Luhr**	**1:05.871**	—	1
2	**P2**	**#552 Level 5 Motorsports**	**Mike Conway**	**1:08.785**	**+2.914**	4
3	P2	#551 Level 5 Motorsports	Marino Franchitti	1:09.031	+3.160	5
4	P1	#16 Dyson Racing Team	Tony Burgess	1:09.564	+3.693	2
5	P2	#02 Extreme Speed Motorsports	Johannes van Overbeek	1:09.740	+3.869	6
6	**PC**	**#05 CORE Autosport**	**Colin Braun**	**1:10.303**	**+4.432**	8
7	P1	#0 DeltaWing Racing Cars	Andy Meyrick	1:10.531	+4.660	3
8	PC	#81 8 Star Mishumotors	Renger van der Zande	1:10.706	+4.835	13
9	P2	#01 Extreme Speed Motorsports	Scott Sharp	1:10.850	+4.979	7
10	PC	#9 RSR Racing	Bruno Junqueira	1:10.984	+5.113	9
11	PC	#18 Performance Tech Motorsports	Tristan Nunez	1:11.280	+5.409	10
12	PC	#8 BAR1 Motorsports	Kyle Marcelli	1:11.420	+5.549	11
13	PC	#7 BAR1 Motorsports	Rusty Mitchell	1:12.186	+6.315	12
14	PC	#52 PR1/Mathiasen Motorsports	Mike Guasch	1:12.715	+6.844	31^{1}
15	**GT**	**#93 SRT Motorsports**	**Jonathan Bomarito**	**1:15.462**	**+9.591**	14
16	GT	#3 Corvette Racing	Jan Magnussen	1:15.601	+9.730	32^{2}
17	GT	#91 SRT Motorsports	Marc Goossens	1:15.635	+9.764	15
18	GT	#56 BMW Team RLL	Dirk Müller	1:15.672	+9.801	16
19	GT	#55 BMW Team RLL	Bill Auberlen	1:15.726	+9.855	17
20	GT	#4 Corvette Racing	Tommy Milner	1:16.083	+10.212	18
21	GT	#06 CORE Autosport	Patrick Long	1:16.407	+10.536	19
22	GT	#48 Paul Miller Racing	Marco Holzer	1:16.730	+10.859	20
23	GT	#17 Team Falken Tire	Wolf Henzler	1:16.976	+11.105	21
24	GT	#23 Team West/AJR/Boardwalk Ferrari	Townsend Bell	1:17.039	+11.168	22
25	**GTC**	**#22 Alex Job Racing**	**Jeroen Bleekemolen**	**1:21.310**	**+15.439**	23
26	GTC	#30 NGT Motorsports	Sean Edwards	1:21.540	+15.669	24
27	GTC	#45 Flying Lizard Motorsports	Spencer Pumpelly	1:21.924	+16.053	25
28	GTC	#27 Dempsey Del Piero Racing	Andy Lally	1:21.930	+16.059	26
29	GTC	#44 Flying Lizard Motorsports	Dion von Moltke	1:22.022	+16.151	27
30	GTC	#66 TRG	Damien Faulkner	1:22.182	+16.311	28
31	GTC	#68 TRG	Ryan Dalziel	1:22.581	+16.710	29
32	GTC	#11 JDX Racing	Jan Heylen	1:22.885	+17.014	30
Sources:

- – The #52 PR1 Mathiesen Motorsports and the #3 Corvette Racing entries were moved to the back of the grid for changing a tire between qualifying and the race.

== Race ==
=== Race result ===
Class winners in bold. Cars failing to complete 70% of their class winner's distance are marked as Not Classified (NC).

Pos	Class	No	Team	Drivers	Chassis	Tire	Laps
Pos	Class	No	Team	Drivers	Engine	Tire	Laps
1	**P1**	**6**	**(United States) Muscle Milk Pickett Racing**	**(Germany) Klaus Graf (Germany) Lucas Luhr**	**HPD ARX-03a**	M	**132**
1	**P1**	**6**	**(United States) Muscle Milk Pickett Racing**	**(Germany) Klaus Graf (Germany) Lucas Luhr**	**Honda 3.4 L V8**	M	**132**
2	**P2**	**551**	**(United States) Level 5 Motorsports**	**(United States) Scott Tucker (United Kingdom) Marino Franchitti**	**HPD ARX-03b**	M	**128**
2	**P2**	**551**	**(United States) Level 5 Motorsports**	**(United States) Scott Tucker (United Kingdom) Marino Franchitti**	**Honda HR28TT 2.8 L Turbo V6**	M	**128**
3	P2	01	(United States) Extreme Speed Motorsports	(United States) Scott Sharp (United States) Guy Cosmo	HPD ARX-03b	M	127
3	P2	01	(United States) Extreme Speed Motorsports	(United States) Scott Sharp (United States) Guy Cosmo	Honda HR28TT 2.8 L Turbo V6	M	127
4	P2	552	(United States) Level 5 Motorsports	(United States) Scott Tucker (United Kingdom) Mike Conway	HPD ARX-03b	M	127
4	P2	552	(United States) Level 5 Motorsports	(United States) Scott Tucker (United Kingdom) Mike Conway	Honda HR28TT 2.8 L Turbo V6	M	127
5	P2	02	(United States) Extreme Speed Motorsports	(United States) Ed Brown (United States) Johannes van Overbeek	HPD ARX-03b	M	126
5	P2	02	(United States) Extreme Speed Motorsports	(United States) Ed Brown (United States) Johannes van Overbeek	Honda HR28TT 2.8 L Turbo V6	M	126
6	P1	16	(United States) Dyson Racing Team	(Canada) Tony Burgess (United States) Chris McMurry	Lola B12/60	M	125
6	P1	16	(United States) Dyson Racing Team	(Canada) Tony Burgess (United States) Chris McMurry	Mazda MZR-R 2.0 L Turbo I4 (Isobutanol)	M	125
7	**PC**	**05**	**(United States) CORE Autosport**	**(United States) Jon Bennett (United States) Colin Braun**	**Oreca FLM09**	C	**125**
7	**PC**	**05**	**(United States) CORE Autosport**	**(United States) Jon Bennett (United States) Colin Braun**	**Chevrolet 6.2 L V8**	C	**125**
8	PC	81	(United States) 8 Star Mishumotors	(Germany) Mirco Schultis (Netherlands) Renger van der Zande	Oreca FLM09	C	125
8	PC	81	(United States) 8 Star Mishumotors	(Germany) Mirco Schultis (Netherlands) Renger van der Zande	Chevrolet 6.2 L V8	C	125
9	PC	8	(United States) BAR1 Motorsports	(Canada) Kyle Marcelli (Canada) Chris Cumming	Oreca FLM09	C	125
9	PC	8	(United States) BAR1 Motorsports	(Canada) Kyle Marcelli (Canada) Chris Cumming	Chevrolet 6.2 L V8	C	125
10	PC	52	(United States) PR1/Mathiasen Motorsports	(United States) David Cheng (United States) Mike Guasch	Oreca FLM09	C	124
10	PC	52	(United States) PR1/Mathiasen Motorsports	(United States) David Cheng (United States) Mike Guasch	Chevrolet 6.2 L V8	C	124
11	**GT**	**4**	**(United States) Corvette Racing**	**(United Kingdom) Oliver Gavin (United States) Tommy Milner**	**Chevrolet Corvette C6.R**	M	**123**
11	**GT**	**4**	**(United States) Corvette Racing**	**(United Kingdom) Oliver Gavin (United States) Tommy Milner**	**Chevrolet 5.5 L V8**	M	**123**
12	GT	91	(United States) SRT Motorsports	(Belgium) Marc Goossens (Germany) Dominik Farnbacher	SRT Viper GTS-R	M	123
12	GT	91	(United States) SRT Motorsports	(Belgium) Marc Goossens (Germany) Dominik Farnbacher	SRT 8.0 L V10	M	123
13	GT	93	(United States) SRT Motorsports	(Canada) Kuno Wittmer (United States) Jonathan Bomarito	SRT Viper GTS-R	M	123
13	GT	93	(United States) SRT Motorsports	(Canada) Kuno Wittmer (United States) Jonathan Bomarito	SRT 8.0 L V10	M	123
14	GT	3	(United States) Corvette Racing	(Denmark) Jan Magnussen (Spain) Antonio García	Chevrolet Corvette C6.R	M	123
14	GT	3	(United States) Corvette Racing	(Denmark) Jan Magnussen (Spain) Antonio García	Chevrolet 5.5 L V8	M	123
15	GT	56	(United States) BMW Team RLL	(United States) Joey Hand (Germany) Dirk Müller	BMW Z4 GTE	M	123
15	GT	56	(United States) BMW Team RLL	(United States) Joey Hand (Germany) Dirk Müller	BMW 4.4 L V8	M	123
16	GT	55	(United States) BMW Team RLL	(United States) Bill Auberlen (Belgium) Maxime Martin	BMW Z4 GTE	M	122
16	GT	55	(United States) BMW Team RLL	(United States) Bill Auberlen (Belgium) Maxime Martin	BMW 4.4 L V8	M	122
17	GT	23	(United States) Team West/AJR/Boardwalk Ferrari	(United States) Townsend Bell (United States) Leh Keen	Ferrari 458 Italia GT2	Y	122
17	GT	23	(United States) Team West/AJR/Boardwalk Ferrari	(United States) Townsend Bell (United States) Leh Keen	Ferrari 4.5 L V8	Y	122
18	GT	06	(United States) CORE Autosport	(United States) Patrick Long (United Kingdom) Tom Kimber-Smith	Porsche 997 GT3-RSR	M	121
18	GT	06	(United States) CORE Autosport	(United States) Patrick Long (United Kingdom) Tom Kimber-Smith	Porsche 4.0 L Flat-6	M	121
19	GT	48	(United States) Paul Miller Racing	(United States) Bryce Miller (Germany) Marco Holzer	Porsche 997 GT3-RSR	M	121
19	GT	48	(United States) Paul Miller Racing	(United States) Bryce Miller (Germany) Marco Holzer	Porsche 4.0 L Flat-6	M	121
20	GT	17	(United States) Team Falken Tire	(United States) Bryan Sellers (Germany) Wolf Henzler	Porsche 997 GT3-RSR	F	120
20	GT	17	(United States) Team Falken Tire	(United States) Bryan Sellers (Germany) Wolf Henzler	Porsche 4.0 L Flat-6	F	120
21	PC	9	(United States) RSR Racing	(Brazil) Bruno Junqueira (United States) Duncan Ende	Oreca FLM09	C	114
21	PC	9	(United States) RSR Racing	(Brazil) Bruno Junqueira (United States) Duncan Ende	Chevrolet 6.2 L V8	C	114
22	**GTC**	**22**	**(United States) Alex Job Racing**	**(United States) Cooper MacNeil (Netherlands) Jeroen Bleekemolen**	**Porsche 997 GT3 Cup**	Y	**114**
22	**GTC**	**22**	**(United States) Alex Job Racing**	**(United States) Cooper MacNeil (Netherlands) Jeroen Bleekemolen**	**Porsche 4.0 L Flat-6**	Y	**114**
23	GTC	45	(United States) Flying Lizard Motorsports	(United States) Spencer Pumpelly (Venezuela) Nelson Canache, Jr.	Porsche 997 GT3 Cup	Y	114
23	GTC	45	(United States) Flying Lizard Motorsports	(United States) Spencer Pumpelly (Venezuela) Nelson Canache, Jr.	Porsche 4.0 L Flat-6	Y	114
24	GTC	68	(United States) TRG	(Venezuela) Alex Popow (United Kingdom) Ryan Dalziel	Porsche 997 GT3 Cup	Y	114
24	GTC	68	(United States) TRG	(Venezuela) Alex Popow (United Kingdom) Ryan Dalziel	Porsche 4.0 L Flat-6	Y	114
25	GTC	27	(United States) Dempsey Del Piero Racing	(United States) Patrick Dempsey (United States) Andy Lally	Porsche 997 GT3 Cup	Y	113
25	GTC	27	(United States) Dempsey Del Piero Racing	(United States) Patrick Dempsey (United States) Andy Lally	Porsche 4.0 L Flat-6	Y	113
26	GTC	11	(United States) JDX Racing	(United States) Mike Hedlund (Belgium) Jan Heylen	Porsche 997 GT3 Cup	Y	113
26	GTC	11	(United States) JDX Racing	(United States) Mike Hedlund (Belgium) Jan Heylen	Porsche 4.0 L Flat-6	Y	113
27	GTC	30	(United States) NGT Motorsport	(United States) Henrique Cisneros (United Kingdom) Sean Edwards	Porsche 997 GT3 Cup	Y	113
27	GTC	30	(United States) NGT Motorsport	(United States) Henrique Cisneros (United Kingdom) Sean Edwards	Porsche 4.0 L Flat-6	Y	113
28	GTC	44	(United States) Flying Lizard Motorsports	(United States) Seth Neiman (South Africa) Dion von Moltke	Porsche 997 GT3 Cup	Y	108
28	GTC	44	(United States) Flying Lizard Motorsports	(United States) Seth Neiman (South Africa) Dion von Moltke	Porsche 4.0 L Flat-6	Y	108
29	PC	18	(United States) Performance Tech Motorsports	(United States) Tristan Nunez (United States) Charlie Shears	Oreca FLM09	C	105
29	PC	18	(United States) Performance Tech Motorsports	(United States) Tristan Nunez (United States) Charlie Shears	Chevrolet 6.2 L V8	C	105
30	GTC	66	(United States) TRG	(United States) Ben Keating (Republic of Ireland) Damien Faulkner	Porsche 997 GT3 Cup	Y	96
30	GTC	66	(United States) TRG	(United States) Ben Keating (Republic of Ireland) Damien Faulkner	Porsche 4.0 L Flat-6	Y	96
31 DNF	PC	7	(United States) BAR1 Motorsports	(United States) Tomy Drissi (United States) Rusty Mitchell	Oreca FLM09	C	85
31 DNF	PC	7	(United States) BAR1 Motorsports	(United States) Tomy Drissi (United States) Rusty Mitchell	Chevrolet 6.2 L V8	C	85
32 DNF	P1	0	(United States) DeltaWing Racing Cars	(United Kingdom) Katherine Legge (United Kingdom) Andy Meyrick	DeltaWing LM12	B	16
32 DNF	P1	0	(United States) DeltaWing Racing Cars	(United Kingdom) Katherine Legge (United Kingdom) Andy Meyrick	Élan 1.9 L Turbo I4	B	16
OFFICIAL RACE RESULTS

American Le Mans Series
Previous race: Northeast Grand Prix	2013 season	Next race: Orion Energy Systems 245
