= 2013 Petit Le Mans =

Sportscar endurance race in Georgia, US

The Track map of Road Atlanta

The 16th Annual Petit Le Mans presented by Mazda was the 2013 edition of the Petit Le Mans automotive endurance race, held on October 16–19, 2013, at the Road Atlanta circuit in Braselton, Georgia, United States. The 1,000 miles (1,600 km) race was the final Round of the 2013 American Le Mans Series season, as well as the final event of the American Le Mans Series as a whole before the series is reborn as the United SportsCar Championship in 2014. Rebellion Racing's Nick Heidfeld, Nicolas Prost, and Neel Jani won the team's second consecutive Petit Le Mans, a full six laps ahead of the P2 class winning Level 5 Motorsports Honda, who secured a championship for Scott Tucker with the victory. The BAR1 Motorsports won the Prototype Challenge category, their third straight victory of the season. Team Falken Tire Porsche held the GT class lead by less than a second at the finish, while Flying Lizard Motorsports won the GT Challenge category by a margin of six seconds.

== Qualifying ==
The Rebellion Racing LMP1 car qualified on the pole.

=== Qualifying results ===
Pole positions in each class are indicated in bold and with ‡.

Pos.	Class	No.	Entry	Driver	Time	Gap	Grid
1	**P1**	**12**	**(Switzerland) Rebellion Racing**	**(Switzerland) Neel Jani**	**1:09.254**	—	1‡
2	P1	6	(United States) Muscle Milk Pickett Racing	(Germany) Lucas Luhr	1:10.397	+1.143	2
3	**P2**	**01**	**(United States) Extreme Speed Motorsports**	**(Australia) David Brabham**	**1:12.668**	**+3.414**	3‡
4	P2	551	(United States) Level 5 Motorsports	(Australia) Ryan Briscoe	1:12.792	+3.538	4
5	P2	552	(United States) Level 5 Motorsports	(United States) Guy Cosmo	1:13.637	+4.383	5
6	P2	02	(United States) Extreme Speed Motorsports	(United States) Johannes van Overbeek	1:13.929	+4.675	6
7	**PC**	**52**	**(United States) PR1/Mathiasen Motorsports**	**(United States) Dane Cameron**	**1:14.955**	**+5.701**	7‡
8	P1	16	(United States) Dyson Racing Team	(United States) Chris Dyson	1:14.978	+5.724	33^{1}
9	PC	9	(United States) RSR Racing	(Brazil) Bruno Junqueira	1:15.143	+5.889	34^{2}
10	PC	05	(United States) CORE Autosport	(United Kingdom) Tom Kimber-Smith	1:15.215	+5.961	8
11	PC	8	(United States) BAR1 Motorsports	(Canada) Kyle Marcelli	1:15.367	+6.113	9
12	PC	25	(United States) 8 Star Motorsports	(United States) Sean Rayhall	1:15.399	+6.145	10
13	PC	18	(United States) Performance Tech Motorsports	(United States) Tristan Nunez	1:15.604	+6.350	11
14	PC	7	(United States) BAR1 Motorsports	(United States) Rusty Mitchell	1:16.001	+6.747	12
15	P1	0	(United States) DeltaWing Racing Cars	(United Kingdom) Andy Meyrick	1:16.206	+6.952	13
16	**GT**	**62**	**(United States) Risi Competizione**	**(Italy) Matteo Malucelli**	**1:18.861**	**+9.607**	14‡
17	GT	93	(United States) SRT Motorsports	(United States) Jonathan Bomarito	1:18.888	+9.634	15
18	GT	91	(United States) SRT Motorsports	(Germany) Dominik Farnbacher	1:19.017	+9.763	16
19	GT	3	(United States) Corvette Racing	(Spain) Antonio García	1:19.128	+9.874	17
20	GT	56	(United States) BMW Team RLL	(United States) John Edwards	1:19.228	+9.974	18
21	GT	17	(United States) Team Falken Tire	(Germany) Dominik Farnbacher	1:19.386	+10.132	19
22	GT	4	(United States) Corvette Racing	(United Kingdom) Oliver Gavin	1:19.440	+10.186	20
23	GT	06	(United States) CORE Autosport	(United States) Patrick Long	1:19.947	+10.693	21
24	GT	55	(United States) BMW Team RLL	(Germany) Uwe Alzen	1:19.954	+10.700	22
25	GT	48	(United States) Paul Miller Racing	(United States) Bryce Miller	1:20.497	+11.243	23
26	GT	23	(United States) Team West/AJR/Boardwalk Ferrari	(United States) Leh Keen	1:20.506	+11.252	24
27	**GTC**	**45**	**(United States) Flying Lizard Motorsports**	**(United States) Spencer Pumpelly**	**1:24.118**	**+14.864**	25‡
28	GTC	22	(United States) Alex Job Racing	(Netherlands) Jeroen Bleekemolen	1:24.433	+15.179	26
29	GTC	27	(United States) Dempsey Racing/Del Piero	(United States) Andy Lally	1:24.480	+15.226	27
30	GTC	11	(United States) JDX Racing	(Belgium) Jan Heylen	1:24.923	+15.669	28
31	GTC	66	(United States) TRG	(Republic of Ireland) Damien Faulkner	1:24.926	+15.672	29
32	GTC	31	(United States) NGT Motorsport	(France) Nicolas Armindo	1:25.237	+15.983	30
33	GTC	10	(United States) Dempsey Racing/Del Piero	(United States) Charles Espenlaub	1:25.368	+16.114	31
34	GTC	44	(United States) Flying Lizard Motorsports	(United States) Seth Neiman	1:28.039	+18.785	32
Sources:

- **^1** - The No. 16 Dyson Racing entry was moved to the back of the grid for changing tires between qualifying and the race.
- **^2** - The No. 9 RSR Racing entry was moved to the back of the grid after the car failed post-qualifying technical inspection.

== Race ==
=== Race result ===
Class winners in bold. Cars failing to complete 70% of their class winner's distance are marked as Not Classified (NC).

Pos	Class	No	Team	Drivers	Chassis	Tire	Laps
Pos	Class	No	Team	Drivers	Engine	Tire	Laps
1	**P1**	**12**	**(Switzerland) Rebellion Racing**	**(Germany) Nick Heidfeld (Switzerland) Neel Jani (France) Nicolas Prost**	**Lola B12/60**	M	**394**
1	**P1**	**12**	**(Switzerland) Rebellion Racing**	**(Germany) Nick Heidfeld (Switzerland) Neel Jani (France) Nicolas Prost**	**Toyota RV8KLM 3.4 L V8**	M	**394**
2	**P2**	**551**	**(United States) Level 5 Motorsports**	**(United States) Scott Tucker (Australia) Ryan Briscoe (United Kingdom) Marino Franchitti**	**HPD ARX-03b**	M	**388**
2	**P2**	**551**	**(United States) Level 5 Motorsports**	**(United States) Scott Tucker (Australia) Ryan Briscoe (United Kingdom) Marino Franchitti**	**Honda HR28TT 2.8 L Turbo V6**	M	**388**
3	P2	01	(United States) Extreme Speed Motorsports	(United States) Scott Sharp (United States) Anthony Lazzaro (Australia) David Brabham	HPD ARX-03b	M	388
3	P2	01	(United States) Extreme Speed Motorsports	(United States) Scott Sharp (United States) Anthony Lazzaro (Australia) David Brabham	Honda HR28TT 2.8 L Turbo V6	M	388
4	P2	552	(United States) Level 5 Motorsports	(United States) Guy Cosmo (United Kingdom) Jonny Kane (United Kingdom) Peter Dumbreck	HPD ARX-03b	M	387
4	P2	552	(United States) Level 5 Motorsports	(United States) Guy Cosmo (United Kingdom) Jonny Kane (United Kingdom) Peter Dumbreck	Honda HR28TT 2.8 L Turbo V6	M	387
5	**PC**	**8**	**(United States) BAR1 Motorsports**	**(Canada) Kyle Marcelli (Canada) Chris Cumming (Sweden) Stefan Johansson**	**Oreca FLM09**	C	**380**
5	**PC**	**8**	**(United States) BAR1 Motorsports**	**(Canada) Kyle Marcelli (Canada) Chris Cumming (Sweden) Stefan Johansson**	**Chevrolet 6.2 L V8**	C	**380**
6	PC	25	(United States) 8 Star Motorsports	(United States) Sean Rayhall (Brazil) Oswaldo Negri	Oreca FLM09	C	380
6	PC	25	(United States) 8 Star Motorsports	(United States) Sean Rayhall (Brazil) Oswaldo Negri	Chevrolet 6.2 L V8	C	380
7	PC	05	(United States) CORE Autosport	(United States) Jon Bennett (United Kingdom) Tom Kimber-Smith (Canada) Mark Wilkins	Oreca FLM09	C	377
7	PC	05	(United States) CORE Autosport	(United States) Jon Bennett (United Kingdom) Tom Kimber-Smith (Canada) Mark Wilkins	Chevrolet 6.2 L V8	C	377
8	**GT**	**17**	**(United States) Team Falken Tire**	**(United States) Bryan Sellers (Germany) Wolf Henzler (United Kingdom) Nick Tandy**	**Porsche 997 GT3-RSR**	F	**375**
8	**GT**	**17**	**(United States) Team Falken Tire**	**(United States) Bryan Sellers (Germany) Wolf Henzler (United Kingdom) Nick Tandy**	**Porsche 4.0 L Flat-6**	F	**375**
9	GT	56	(United States) BMW Team RLL	(United States) John Edwards (United States) Bill Auberlen (Germany) Dirk Müller	BMW Z4 GTE	M	375
9	GT	56	(United States) BMW Team RLL	(United States) John Edwards (United States) Bill Auberlen (Germany) Dirk Müller	BMW 4.4 L V8	M	375
10	GT	62	(United States) Risi Competizione	(Monaco) Olivier Beretta (Italy) Matteo Malucelli (United Kingdom) Robin Liddell	Ferrari 458 Italia GT2	M	375
10	GT	62	(United States) Risi Competizione	(Monaco) Olivier Beretta (Italy) Matteo Malucelli (United Kingdom) Robin Liddell	Ferrari 4.5 L V8	M	375
11	P1	16	(United States) Dyson Racing Team	(United States) Chris Dyson (United States) Chris McMurry (Canada) Tony Burgess	Lola B12/60	M	374
11	P1	16	(United States) Dyson Racing Team	(United States) Chris Dyson (United States) Chris McMurry (Canada) Tony Burgess	Mazda MZR-R 2.0 L Turbo I4 (Butanol)	M	374
12	GT	55	(United States) BMW Team RLL	(Belgium) Maxime Martin (Germany) Jörg Müller (Germany) Uwe Alzen	BMW Z4 GTE	M	374
12	GT	55	(United States) BMW Team RLL	(Belgium) Maxime Martin (Germany) Jörg Müller (Germany) Uwe Alzen	BMW 4.4 L V8	M	374
13	GT	93	(United States) SRT Motorsports	(Canada) Kuno Wittmer (United States) Jonathan Bomarito (United States) Tommy Kendall	SRT Viper GTS-R	M	373
13	GT	93	(United States) SRT Motorsports	(Canada) Kuno Wittmer (United States) Jonathan Bomarito (United States) Tommy Kendall	SRT 8.0 L V10	M	373
14	GT	3	(United States) Corvette Racing	(Denmark) Jan Magnussen (Spain) Antonio García (United States) Jordan Taylor	Chevrolet Corvette C6.R	M	373
14	GT	3	(United States) Corvette Racing	(Denmark) Jan Magnussen (Spain) Antonio García (United States) Jordan Taylor	Chevrolet 5.5 L V8	M	373
15	GT	91	(United States) SRT Motorsports	(Belgium) Marc Goossens (Germany) Dominik Farnbacher (United Kingdom) Ryan Dalziel	SRT Viper GTS-R	M	372
15	GT	91	(United States) SRT Motorsports	(Belgium) Marc Goossens (Germany) Dominik Farnbacher (United Kingdom) Ryan Dalziel	SRT 8.0 L V10	M	372
16	GT	06	(United States) CORE Autosport	(United States) Patrick Long (United States) Colin Braun (Denmark) Michael Christensen	Porsche 997 GT3-RSR	M	372
16	GT	06	(United States) CORE Autosport	(United States) Patrick Long (United States) Colin Braun (Denmark) Michael Christensen	Porsche 4.0 L Flat-6	M	372
17	P2	02	(United States) Extreme Speed Motorsports	(United States) Ed Brown (United States) Johannes van Overbeek (United Kingdom) Rob Bell	HPD ARX-03b	M	369
17	P2	02	(United States) Extreme Speed Motorsports	(United States) Ed Brown (United States) Johannes van Overbeek (United Kingdom) Rob Bell	Honda HR28TT 2.8 L Turbo V6	M	369
18	GT	23	(United States) Team West/AJR/Boardwalk Ferrari	(United Kingdom) Johnny Mowlem (United States) Bill Sweedler (United States) Leh Keen	Ferrari 458 Italia GT2	Y	369
18	GT	23	(United States) Team West/AJR/Boardwalk Ferrari	(United Kingdom) Johnny Mowlem (United States) Bill Sweedler (United States) Leh Keen	Ferrari 4.5 L V8	Y	369
19	GT	4	(United States) Corvette Racing	(United Kingdom) Oliver Gavin (United Kingdom) Richard Westbrook (United States) Tommy Milner	Chevrolet Corvette C6.R	M	369
19	GT	4	(United States) Corvette Racing	(United Kingdom) Oliver Gavin (United Kingdom) Richard Westbrook (United States) Tommy Milner	Chevrolet 5.5 L V8	M	369
20	PC	7	(United States) BAR1 Motorsports	(United States) Tomy Drissi (United States) Rusty Mitchell (United States) James French	Oreca FLM09	C	365
20	PC	7	(United States) BAR1 Motorsports	(United States) Tomy Drissi (United States) Rusty Mitchell (United States) James French	Chevrolet 6.2 L V8	C	365
21	PC	52	(United States) PR1 Mathiasen Motorsports	(United States) Dane Cameron (United States) Mike Guasch (United States) David Cheng	Oreca FLM09	C	359
21	PC	52	(United States) PR1 Mathiasen Motorsports	(United States) Dane Cameron (United States) Mike Guasch (United States) David Cheng	Chevrolet 6.2 L V8	C	359
22	**GTC**	**45**	**(United States) Flying Lizard Motorsports**	**(United States) Spencer Pumpelly (United States) Madison Snow (Venezuela) Nelson Canache, Jr.**	**Porsche 997 GT3 Cup**	Y	**357**
22	**GTC**	**45**	**(United States) Flying Lizard Motorsports**	**(United States) Spencer Pumpelly (United States) Madison Snow (Venezuela) Nelson Canache, Jr.**	**Porsche 4.0 L Flat-6**	Y	**357**
23	GTC	27	(United States) Dempsey Racing	(United States) Patrick Dempsey (United States) Andy Lally (United States) Joe Foster	Porsche 997 GT3 Cup	Y	357
23	GTC	27	(United States) Dempsey Racing	(United States) Patrick Dempsey (United States) Andy Lally (United States) Joe Foster	Porsche 4.0 L Flat-6	Y	357
24	GTC	11	(United States) JDX Racing	(United States) Mike Hedlund (United States) Jon Fogarty (Belgium) Jan Heylen	Porsche 997 GT3 Cup	Y	357
24	GTC	11	(United States) JDX Racing	(United States) Mike Hedlund (United States) Jon Fogarty (Belgium) Jan Heylen	Porsche 4.0 L Flat-6	Y	357
25	GTC	22	(United States) Alex Job Racing	(United States) Cooper MacNeil (Netherlands) Jeroen Bleekemolen (Netherlands) Sebastiaan Bleekemolen	Porsche 997 GT3 Cup	Y	356
25	GTC	22	(United States) Alex Job Racing	(United States) Cooper MacNeil (Netherlands) Jeroen Bleekemolen (Netherlands) Sebastiaan Bleekemolen	Porsche 4.0 L Flat-6	Y	356
26	GTC	44	(United States) Flying Lizard Motorsports	(United States) Seth Neiman (United States) Brett Sandberg (South Africa) Dion von Moltke	Porsche 997 GT3 Cup	Y	344
26	GTC	44	(United States) Flying Lizard Motorsports	(United States) Seth Neiman (United States) Brett Sandberg (South Africa) Dion von Moltke	Porsche 4.0 L Flat-6	Y	344
27	GTC	66	(United States) TRG	(United States) Ben Keating (United States) Craig Stanton (Republic of Ireland) Damien Faulkner	Porsche 997 GT3 Cup	Y	339
27	GTC	66	(United States) TRG	(United States) Ben Keating (United States) Craig Stanton (Republic of Ireland) Damien Faulkner	Porsche 4.0 L Flat-6	Y	339
28	GTC	31	(United States) NGT Motorsport	(Venezuela) Angel Benitez, Jr. (Denmark) Christina Nielsen (France) Nicolas Armindo	Porsche 997 GT3 Cup	Y	339
28	GTC	31	(United States) NGT Motorsport	(Venezuela) Angel Benitez, Jr. (Denmark) Christina Nielsen (France) Nicolas Armindo	Porsche 4.0 L Flat-6	Y	339
29	PC	9	(United States) RSR Racing	(Brazil) Bruno Junqueira (United States) Duncan Ende (United States) Gustavo Menezes	Oreca FLM09	C	295
29	PC	9	(United States) RSR Racing	(Brazil) Bruno Junqueira (United States) Duncan Ende (United States) Gustavo Menezes	Chevrolet 6.2 L V8	C	295
30 DNF	GTC	10	(United States) Dempsey Racing	(United States) Charlie Putman (United States) Charles Espenlaub (United States) Darren Law	Porsche 997 GT3 Cup	Y	277
30 DNF	GTC	10	(United States) Dempsey Racing	(United States) Charlie Putman (United States) Charles Espenlaub (United States) Darren Law	Porsche 4.0 L Flat-6	Y	277
31 DNF	P1	0	(United States) DeltaWing Racing Cars	(United Kingdom) Katherine Legge (United Kingdom) Andy Meyrick	DeltaWing DWC13	B	209
31 DNF	P1	0	(United States) DeltaWing Racing Cars	(United Kingdom) Katherine Legge (United Kingdom) Andy Meyrick	Élan 1.9 L Turbo I4	B	209
32 DNF	P1	6	(United States) Muscle Milk Pickett Racing	(Germany) Klaus Graf (Germany) Lucas Luhr (France) Romain Dumas	HPD ARX-03a	M	200
32 DNF	P1	6	(United States) Muscle Milk Pickett Racing	(Germany) Klaus Graf (Germany) Lucas Luhr (France) Romain Dumas	Honda 3.4 L V8	M	200
33 DNF	PC	18	(United States) Performance Tech Motorsports	(United States) Tristan Nunez (United States) Charlie Shears	Oreca FLM09	C	121
33 DNF	PC	18	(United States) Performance Tech Motorsports	(United States) Tristan Nunez (United States) Charlie Shears	Chevrolet 6.2 L V8	C	121
34 DNF	GT	48	(United States) Paul Miller Racing	(United States) Bryce Miller (Germany) Marco Holzer (France) Emmanuel Collard	Porsche 997 GT3-RSR	M	76
34 DNF	GT	48	(United States) Paul Miller Racing	(United States) Bryce Miller (Germany) Marco Holzer (France) Emmanuel Collard	Porsche 4.0 L Flat-6	M	76

American Le Mans Series
Previous race: American Le Mans Series VIR 240	2013 season	Next race: None
