= 2013 Orion Energy Systems 245 =

Sports car race

Track map of Road America

The 2013 Orion Energy Systems 245 was a sports car race held at Road America in Elkhart Lake, Wisconsin on August 11, 2013. The race was the sixth round of the 2013 American Le Mans Series.

== Background ==
=== Preview ===
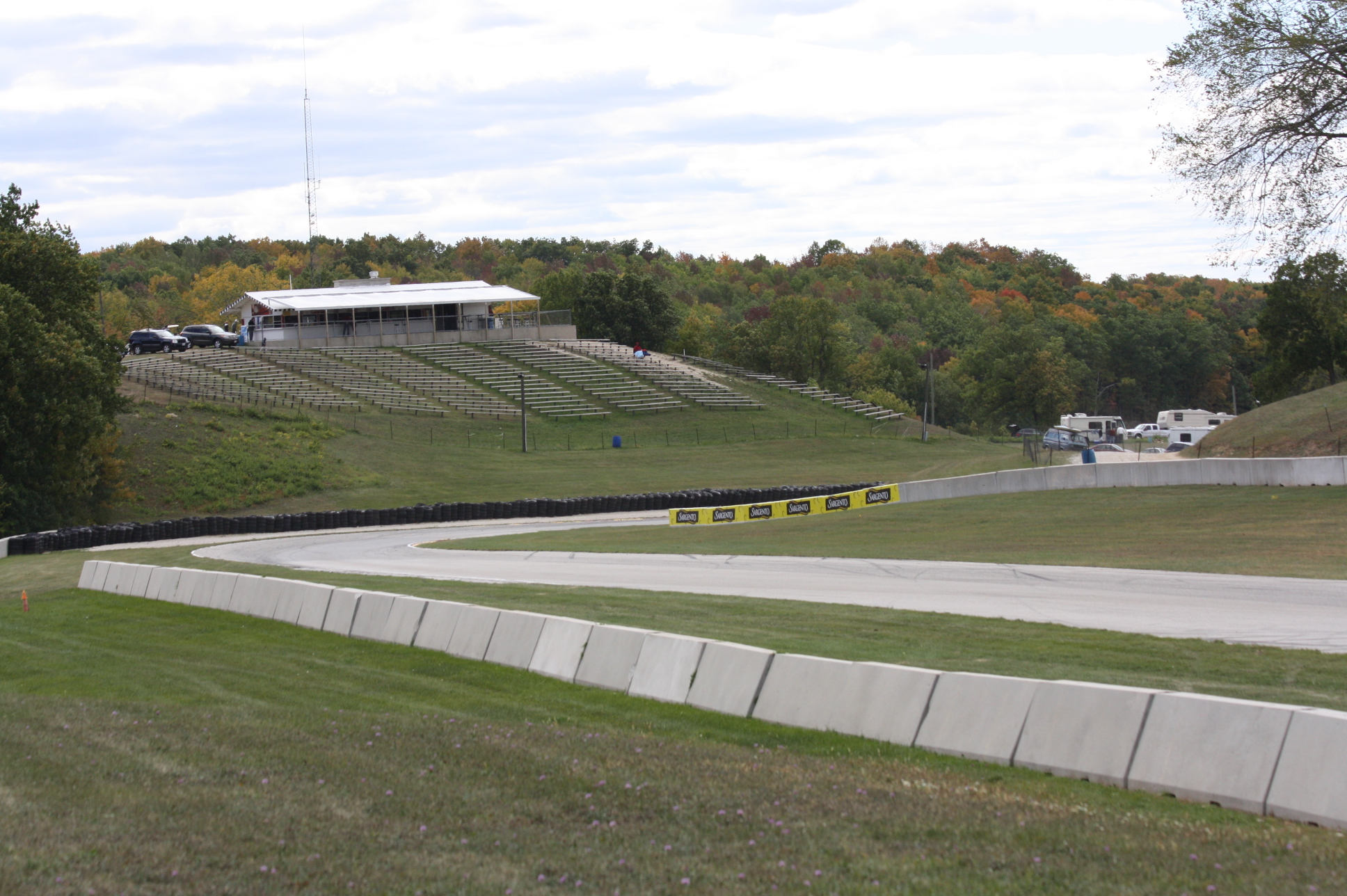
Road America, where the race was held.

American Le Mans Series (ALMS) president Scott Atherton confirmed the race was part of the schedule for the 2013 American Le Mans Series schedule in October 2012. It was the twelfth consecutive year the event was held as part of the American Le Mans Series. The 2013 Orion Energy Systems 245 was the sixth of ten scheduled sports car races of 2013 American Le Mans Series. It was held at the fourteen-turn 4.048 mi (6.515 km) Road America in Elkhart Lake, Wisconsin on August 11, 2013. The event was run alongside the Rolex Sports Car Series event as a double-header.

Before the race, Klaus Graf and Lucas Luhr led the P1 Drivers' Championship with 102 points, 44 ahead of Nick Heidfeld and Neel Jani. With 92 points, Marino Franchitti led the P2 Drivers' Championship over Scott Tucker by 3 points. In PC, Colin Braun led the Drivers' Championship with 86 points, ahead of Mike Guasch. Dirk Müller led the GT Drivers' Championship with 70 points, 5 points ahead of Oliver Gavin and Tommy Milner. With 77 points, Jeroen Bleekemolen and Cooper MacNeil led the GTC Drivers' Championship, ahead of Nelson Canache Jr. and Spencer Pumpelly.

=== Entry list ===
No.	Entrant	Car	Driver 1	Driver 2
P1
0	(United States) DeltaWing Racing Cars	DeltaWing LM12	(United Kingdom) Katherine Legge	(United Kingdom) Andy Meyrick
6	(United States) Muscle Milk Pickett Racing	HPD ARX-03c	(Germany) Klaus Graf	(Germany) Lucas Luhr
16	(United States) Dyson Racing Team	Lola B12/60	(Canada) Tony Burgess	(United States) Chris McMurry
P2
01	(United States) Extreme Speed Motorsports	HPD ARX-03b	(United States) Scott Sharp	(United States) Guy Cosmo
02	(United States) Extreme Speed Motorsports	HPD ARX-03b	(United States) Ed Brown	(United States) Johannes van Overbeek
551	(United States) Level 5 Motorsports	HPD ARX-03b	(United States) Scott Tucker	(France) Simon Pagenaud
552	(United States) Level 5 Motorsports	HPD ARX-03b	(United States) Scott Tucker	(United Kingdom) Marino Franchitti
PC
7	(United States) BAR1 Motorsports	Oreca FLM09	(United States) Rusty Mitchell	(United States) James French
8	(United States) BAR1 Motorsports	Oreca FLM09	(Canada) Kyle Marcelli	(Canada) Chris Cumming
9	(United States) RSR Racing	Oreca FLM09	(Brazil) Bruno Junqueira	(United States) Duncan Ende
18	(United States) Performance Tech Motorsports	Oreca FLM09	(United States) Tristan Nunez	(United States) Charlie Shears
52	(United States) PR1/Mathiasen Motorsports	Oreca FLM09	(United States) David Cheng	(United States) Mike Guasch
81	(Germany) DragonSpeed	Oreca FLM09	(Germany) Mirco Schultis	(Netherlands) Renger van der Zande
05	(United States) CORE Autosport	Oreca FLM09	(United States) Jon Bennett	(United States) Colin Braun
GT
3	(United States) Corvette Racing	Chevrolet Corvette C6.R	(Denmark) Jan Magnussen	(Spain) Antonio García
4	(United States) Corvette Racing	Chevrolet Corvette C6.R	(United Kingdom) Oliver Gavin	(United States) Tommy Milner
17	(United States) Team Falken Tire	Porsche 911 GT3-RSR	(United States) Bryan Sellers	(Germany) Wolf Henzler
23	(United States) Team West/AJR/Boardwalk Ferrari	Ferrari 458 Italia GT2	(United States) Townsend Bell	(United States) Leh Keen
48	(United States) Paul Miller Racing	Porsche 911 GT3-RSR	(United States) Bryce Miller	(Germany) Marco Holzer
55	(United States) BMW Team RLL	BMW Z4 GTE	(United States) Bill Auberlen	(Belgium) Maxime Martin
56	(United States) BMW Team RLL	BMW Z4 GTE	(Germany) Dirk Müller	(United States) John Edwards
62	(United States) Risi Competizione	Ferrari 458 Italia GT2	(Monaco) Olivier Beretta	(Italy) Matteo Malucelli
91	(United States) SRT Motorsports	SRT Viper GTS-R	(Belgium) Marc Goossens	(Germany) Dominik Farnbacher
93	(United States) SRT Motorsports	SRT Viper GTS-R	(Canada) Kuno Wittmer	(United States) Jonathan Bomarito
06	(United States) CORE Autosport	Porsche 911 GT3-RSR	(United States) Patrick Long	(United Kingdom) Tom Kimber-Smith
GTC
11	(United States) JDX Racing	Porsche 911 GT3 Cup	(United States) Mike Hedlund	(Belgium) Jan Heylen
22	(United States) Alex Job Racing	Porsche 911 GT3 Cup	(United States) Cooper MacNeil	(Netherlands) Jeroen Bleekemolen
27	(United States) Dempsey Racing/Del Piero	Porsche 911 GT3 Cup	(United States) Patrick Dempsey	(United States) Andy Lally
30	(United States) NGT Motorsport	Porsche 911 GT3 Cup	(United States) Henrique Cisneros	(United Kingdom) Sean Edwards
44	(United States) Flying Lizard Motorsports	Porsche 911 GT3 Cup	(United States) Seth Neiman	(South Africa) Dion von Moltke
45	(United States) Flying Lizard Motorsports	Porsche 911 GT3 Cup	(United States) Spencer Pumpelly	(Venezuela) Nelson Canache Jr.
66	(United States) TRG	Porsche 911 GT3 Cup	(United States) Ben Keating	(Republic of Ireland) Damien Faulkner
68	(United States) TRG	Porsche 911 GT3 Cup	(United States) Jeff Courtney	(United States) Madison Snow

== Qualifying ==
A 65-minute qualifying session divided into four 15-minute sessions was held in the morning of August 10. The rules required each team to nominate one qualifying driver, with the quickest laps determining each class' starting order.

Luhr's 1:51.460 lap secured Muscle Milk's third pole position. The lap time was more than two-seconds faster than McMurry's No. 16 Dyson Lola and Legge in the DeltaWing rounded out the P1 field. Level 5 earned the P2 pole position with a time of 1:54.806 set by Franchitti. Cosmo's No. 01 ESM car and Simon Pagenaud's Level 5 entry were second and third in class.

Colin Braun took his fifth pole position of the season in PC with a lap of 1 minute, 57.630 seconds. He was joined by Bruno Junqueira's RSR Racing car on the grid's front row with his best lap being 0.082 second slower. Bomarito's 2:03.410 lap secured him his second consecutive pole position of the season in GT. García qualified the No. 3. Corvette second. Keen in the No. 23 AJR Ferrari set the third fastest time, but would start at the back of the field after his car failed the post-qualifying technical inspection. As a result, Oliver Gavin would start in third position. Pumpelly reset the GTC lap record with a time of 2:11.931, putting the No. 45 Flying Lizard on pole. Edwards qualified the NGT car second and Heylen's No. 11 JDX Porsche was third in class.

=== Qualifying results ===
Pole positions in each class are indicated in bold and by ‡.

Pos.	Class	No.	Entry	Driver	Time	Gap	Grid
1	**P1**	**6**	**(United States) Muscle Milk Pickett Racing**	**(Germany) Lucas Luhr**	**1:51.460**	—	1‡
2	P1	16	(United States) Dyson Racing Team	(United States) Chris McMurry	1:53.580	+2.120	2
3	**P2**	**552**	**(United States) Level 5 Motorsports**	**(United Kingdom) Marino Franchitti**	**1:54.806**	**+3.346**	3‡
4	P1	0	(United States) DeltaWing Racing Cars	(United Kingdom) Katherine Legge	1:55.362	+3.902	4
5	P2	01	(United States) Extreme Speed Motorsports	(United States) Guy Cosmo	1:55.622	+4.162	5
6	P2	551	(United States) Level 5 Motorsports	(France) Simon Pagenaud	1:55.793	+4.333	6
7	P2	02	(United States) Extreme Speed Motorsports	(United States) Johannes van Overbeek	1:56.085	+4.625	7
8	**PC**	**05**	**(United States) CORE Autosport**	**(United States) Colin Braun**	**1:57.630**	**+6.170**	8‡
9	PC	9	(United States) RSR Racing	(Brazil) Bruno Junqueira	1:57.712	+6.252	9
10	PC	18	(United States) Performance Tech Motorsports	(United States) Tristan Nunez	1:57.885	+6.425	10
11	PC	81	(Germany) DragonSpeed	(Netherlands) Renger van der Zande	1:57.912	+6.452	11
12	PC	8	(United States) BAR1 Motorsports	(Canada) Kyle Marcelli	1:58.399	+6.939	12
13	PC	7	(United States) BAR1 Motorsports	(United States) Rusty Mitchell	2:00.352	+8.892	13
14	PC	52	(United States) PR1/Mathiasen Motorsports	(United States) Mike Guasch	2:00.478	+9.018	14
15	**GT**	**93**	**(United States) SRT Motorsports**	**(United States) Jonathan Bomarito**	**2:03.410**	**+11.950**	15‡
16	GT	3	(United States) Corvette Racing	(Spain) Antonio García	2:04.212	+12.752	16
17	GT	23	(United States) Team West/AJR/Boardwalk Ferrari	(United States) Leh Keen	2:04.269	+12.809	33^{1}
18	GT	4	(United States) Corvette Racing	(United Kingdom) Oliver Gavin	2:04.277	+12.817	17
19	GT	48	(United States) Paul Miller Racing	(Germany) Marco Holzer	2:04.347	+12.887	18
20	GT	91	(United States) SRT Motorsports	(Germany) Dominik Farnbacher	2:04.427	+12.967	19
21	GT	55	(United States) BMW Team RLL	(United States) Bill Auberlen	2:04.609	+13.149	20
22	GT	06	(United States) CORE Autosport	(United States) Patrick Long	2:04.619	+13.159	21
23	GT	56	(United States) BMW Team RLL	(United States) John Edwards	2:04.630	+13.170	22
24	GT	62	(United States) Risi Competizione	(Italy) Matteo Malucelli	2:04.911	+13.451	23
25	GT	17	(United States) Team Falken Tire	(United States) Bryan Sellers	2:06.088	+14.628	24
26	**GTC**	**45**	**(United States) Flying Lizard Motorsports**	**(United States) Spencer Pumpelly**	**2:11.931**	**+20.471**	25‡
27	GTC	30	(United States) NGT Motorsport	(United Kingdom) Sean Edwards	2:12.386	+20.926	26
28	GTC	11	(United States) JDX Racing	(Belgium) Jan Heylen	2:12.403	+20.943	27
29	GTC	66	(United States) TRG	(Republic of Ireland) Damien Faulkner	2:12.489	+21.029	28
30	GTC	44	(United States) Flying Lizard Motorsports	(South Africa) Dion von Moltke	2:12.844	+21.384	29
31	GTC	22	(United States) Alex Job Racing	(Netherlands) Jeroen Bleekemolen	2:12.989	+21.529	30
32	GTC	27	(United States) Dempsey Racing/Del Piero	(United States) Andy Lally	2:13.047	+21.587	31
33	GTC	68	(United States) TRG	(United States) Jeff Courtney	2:15.073	+23.613	32
Sources:

- **^1** - The No. 23 Team West/AJR/Boardwalk Ferrari was moved to the back of the grid after the car failed post-qualifying technical inspection.

== Race ==
=== Race results ===
Class winners in bold and ‡. Cars failing to complete 70% of their class winner's distance are marked as Not Classified (NC).

Pos	Class	No.	Team	Drivers	Chassis	Tire	Laps	Time/Retired
Pos	Class	No.	Team	Drivers	Engine	Tire	Laps	Time/Retired
1	**P1**	**6**	**(United States) Muscle Milk Pickett Racing**	**(Germany) Klaus Graf (Germany) Lucas Luhr**	**HPD ARX-03c**	MI	**67**	**2:46:40.847‡**
1	**P1**	**6**	**(United States) Muscle Milk Pickett Racing**	**(Germany) Klaus Graf (Germany) Lucas Luhr**	**Honda LM-V8 3.4 L V8**	MI	**67**	**2:46:40.847‡**
2	P1	16	(United States) Dyson Racing Team	(Canada) Tony Burgess (United States) Chris McMurry	Lola B12/60	MI	67	+0.306
2	P1	16	(United States) Dyson Racing Team	(Canada) Tony Burgess (United States) Chris McMurry	Mazda MZR-R 2.0 L Turbo I4 (Isobutanol)	MI	67	+0.306
3	**PC**	**9**	**(United States) RSR Racing**	**(Brazil) Bruno Junqueira (United States) Duncan Ende**	**Oreca FLM09**	C	**67**	**+19.788‡**
3	**PC**	**9**	**(United States) RSR Racing**	**(Brazil) Bruno Junqueira (United States) Duncan Ende**	**Chevrolet 6.2 L V8**	C	**67**	**+19.788‡**
4	PC	8	(United States) BAR1 Motorsports	(Canada) Kyle Marcelli (Canada) Chris Cumming	Oreca FLM09	C	67	+29.809
4	PC	8	(United States) BAR1 Motorsports	(Canada) Kyle Marcelli (Canada) Chris Cumming	Chevrolet 6.2 L V8	C	67	+29.809
5	P1	0	(United States) DeltaWing Racing Cars	(United Kingdom) Katherine Legge (United Kingdom) Andy Meyrick	DeltaWing LM12	B	67	+30.258
5	P1	0	(United States) DeltaWing Racing Cars	(United Kingdom) Katherine Legge (United Kingdom) Andy Meyrick	Élan (Mazda) 1.9 L Turbo I4	B	67	+30.258
6	**P2**	**551**	**(United States) Level 5 Motorsports**	**(United States) Scott Tucker (France) Simon Pagenaud**	**HPD ARX-03b**	MI	**67**	**+32.650‡**
6	**P2**	**551**	**(United States) Level 5 Motorsports**	**(United States) Scott Tucker (France) Simon Pagenaud**	**Honda HR28TT 2.8 L Turbo V6**	MI	**67**	**+32.650‡**
7	P2	01	(United States) Extreme Speed Motorsports	(United States) Scott Sharp (United States) Guy Cosmo	HPD ARX-03b	MI	67	+34.882
7	P2	01	(United States) Extreme Speed Motorsports	(United States) Scott Sharp (United States) Guy Cosmo	Honda HR28TT 2.8 L Turbo V6	MI	67	+34.882
8	P2	552	(United States) Level 5 Motorsports	(United States) Scott Tucker (United Kingdom) Marino Franchitti	HPD ARX-03b	MI	67	+35.726
8	P2	552	(United States) Level 5 Motorsports	(United States) Scott Tucker (United Kingdom) Marino Franchitti	Honda HR28TT 2.8 L Turbo V6	MI	67	+35.726
9	PC	52	(United States) PR1/Mathiasen Motorsports	(United States) David Cheng (United States) Mike Guasch	Oreca FLM09	C	67	+37.601
9	PC	52	(United States) PR1/Mathiasen Motorsports	(United States) David Cheng (United States) Mike Guasch	Chevrolet 6.2 L V8	C	67	+37.601
10	PC	05	(United States) CORE Autosport	(United States) Jon Bennett (United States) Colin Braun	Oreca FLM09	C	67	+38.467
10	PC	05	(United States) CORE Autosport	(United States) Jon Bennett (United States) Colin Braun	Chevrolet 6.2 L V8	C	67	+38.467
11	PC	18	(United States) Performance Tech Motorsports	(United States) Tristan Nunez (United States) Charlie Shears	Oreca FLM09	C	67	+39.728
11	PC	18	(United States) Performance Tech Motorsports	(United States) Tristan Nunez (United States) Charlie Shears	Chevrolet 6.2 L V8	C	67	+39.728
12	PC	81	(Germany) DragonSpeed	(Germany) Mirco Schultis (Netherlands) Renger van der Zande	Oreca FLM09	C	66	+1 lap
12	PC	81	(Germany) DragonSpeed	(Germany) Mirco Schultis (Netherlands) Renger van der Zande	Chevrolet 6.2 L V8	C	66	+1 lap
13	PC	7	(United States) BAR1 Motorsports	(United States) Rusty Mitchell (United States) James French	Oreca FLM09	C	66	+1 lap
13	PC	7	(United States) BAR1 Motorsports	(United States) Rusty Mitchell (United States) James French	Chevrolet 6.2 L V8	C	66	+1 lap
14	**GT**	**91**	**(United States) SRT Motorsports**	**(Belgium) Marc Goossens (Germany) Dominik Farnbacher**	**SRT Viper GTS-R**	MI	**65**	**+2 Laps‡**
14	**GT**	**91**	**(United States) SRT Motorsports**	**(Belgium) Marc Goossens (Germany) Dominik Farnbacher**	**SRT 8.0 L V10**	MI	**65**	**+2 Laps‡**
15	GT	3	(United States) Corvette Racing	(Denmark) Jan Magnussen (Spain) Antonio García	Chevrolet Corvette C6.R	MI	65	+2 Laps
15	GT	3	(United States) Corvette Racing	(Denmark) Jan Magnussen (Spain) Antonio García	Chevrolet 5.5 L V8	MI	65	+2 Laps
16	GT	4	(United States) Corvette Racing	(United Kingdom) Oliver Gavin (United States) Tommy Milner	Chevrolet Corvette C6.R	MI	65	+2 Laps
16	GT	4	(United States) Corvette Racing	(United Kingdom) Oliver Gavin (United States) Tommy Milner	Chevrolet 5.5 L V8	MI	65	+2 Laps
17	GT	48	(United States) Paul Miller Racing	(United States) Bryce Miller (Germany) Marco Holzer	Porsche 911 GT3-RSR	MI	65	+2 Laps
17	GT	48	(United States) Paul Miller Racing	(United States) Bryce Miller (Germany) Marco Holzer	Porsche 4.0 L Flat-6	MI	65	+2 Laps
18	GT	06	(United States) CORE Autosport	(United States) Patrick Long (United Kingdom) Tom Kimber-Smith	Porsche 911 GT3-RSR	MI	65	+2 Laps
18	GT	06	(United States) CORE Autosport	(United States) Patrick Long (United Kingdom) Tom Kimber-Smith	Porsche 4.0 L Flat-6	MI	65	+2 Laps
19	GT	93	(United States) SRT Motorsports	(Canada) Kuno Wittmer (United States) Jonathan Bomarito	SRT Viper GTS-R	MI	65	+2 Laps
19	GT	93	(United States) SRT Motorsports	(Canada) Kuno Wittmer (United States) Jonathan Bomarito	SRT 8.0 L V10	MI	65	+2 Laps
20	GT	55	(United States) BMW Team RLL	(United States) Bill Auberlen (Belgium) Maxime Martin	BMW Z4 GTE	MI	65	+2 Laps
20	GT	55	(United States) BMW Team RLL	(United States) Bill Auberlen (Belgium) Maxime Martin	BMW 4.4 L V8	MI	65	+2 Laps
21	GT	56	(United States) BMW Team RLL	(Germany) Dirk Müller (United States) John Edwards	BMW Z4 GTE	MI	65	+2 Laps
21	GT	56	(United States) BMW Team RLL	(Germany) Dirk Müller (United States) John Edwards	BMW 4.4 L V8	MI	65	+2 Laps
22	GT	17	(United States) Team Falken Tire	(United States) Bryan Sellers (Germany) Wolf Henzler	Porsche 911 GT3-RSR	FAL	65	+2 Laps
22	GT	17	(United States) Team Falken Tire	(United States) Bryan Sellers (Germany) Wolf Henzler	Porsche 4.0 L Flat-6	FAL	65	+2 Laps
23	GT	62	(United States) Risi Competizione	(Monaco) Olivier Beretta (Italy) Matteo Malucelli	Ferrari 458 Italia GT2	MI	65	+2 Laps
23	GT	62	(United States) Risi Competizione	(Monaco) Olivier Beretta (Italy) Matteo Malucelli	Ferrari 4.5 L V8	MI	65	+2 Laps
24	**GTC**	**45**	**(United States) Flying Lizard Motorsports**	**(United States) Spencer Pumpelly (Venezuela) Nelson Canache Jr.**	**Porsche 911 GT3 Cup**	Y	**62**	**+5 Laps‡**
24	**GTC**	**45**	**(United States) Flying Lizard Motorsports**	**(United States) Spencer Pumpelly (Venezuela) Nelson Canache Jr.**	**Porsche 4.0 L Flat-6**	Y	**62**	**+5 Laps‡**
25	GTC	22	(United States) Alex Job Racing	(United States) Cooper MacNeil (Netherlands) Jeroen Bleekemolen	Porsche 911 GT3 Cup	Y	62	+5 Laps
25	GTC	22	(United States) Alex Job Racing	(United States) Cooper MacNeil (Netherlands) Jeroen Bleekemolen	Porsche 4.0 L Flat-6	Y	62	+5 Laps
26	GTC	30	(United States) NGT Motorsport	(United States) Henrique Cisneros (United Kingdom) Sean Edwards	Porsche 911 GT3 Cup	Y	62	+5 Laps
26	GTC	30	(United States) NGT Motorsport	(United States) Henrique Cisneros (United Kingdom) Sean Edwards	Porsche 4.0 L Flat-6	Y	62	+5 Laps
27	GTC	27	(United States) Dempsey Racing/Del Piero	(United States) Patrick Dempsey (United States) Andy Lally	Porsche 911 GT3 Cup	Y	62	+5 Laps
27	GTC	27	(United States) Dempsey Racing/Del Piero	(United States) Patrick Dempsey (United States) Andy Lally	Porsche 4.0 L Flat-6	Y	62	+5 Laps
28	GTC	44	(United States) Flying Lizard Motorsports	(United States) Seth Neiman (South Africa) Dion von Moltke	Porsche 911 GT3 Cup	Y	62	+5 Laps
28	GTC	44	(United States) Flying Lizard Motorsports	(United States) Seth Neiman (South Africa) Dion von Moltke	Porsche 4.0 L Flat-6	Y	62	+5 Laps
29	GTC	68	(United States) TRG	(United States) Jeff Courtney (United States) Madison Snow	Porsche 911 GT3 Cup	Y	62	+5 Laps
29	GTC	68	(United States) TRG	(United States) Jeff Courtney (United States) Madison Snow	Porsche 4.0 L Flat-6	Y	62	+5 Laps
30	GTC	11	(United States) JDX Racing	(United States) Mike Hedlund (Belgium) Jan Heylen	Porsche 911 GT3 Cup	Y	58	+9 Laps
30	GTC	11	(United States) JDX Racing	(United States) Mike Hedlund (Belgium) Jan Heylen	Porsche 4.0 L Flat-6	Y	58	+9 Laps
31 DNF	P2	02	(United States) Extreme Speed Motorsports	(United States) Ed Brown (United States) Johannes van Overbeek	HPD ARX-03b	MI	29	Engine
31 DNF	P2	02	(United States) Extreme Speed Motorsports	(United States) Ed Brown (United States) Johannes van Overbeek	Honda HR28TT 2.8 L Turbo V6	MI	29	Engine
32 DNF	GT	23	(United States) Team West/AJR/Boardwalk Ferrari	(United States) Townsend Bell (United States) Leh Keen	Ferrari 458 Italia GT2	Y	14	Header
32 DNF	GT	23	(United States) Team West/AJR/Boardwalk Ferrari	(United States) Townsend Bell (United States) Leh Keen	Ferrari 4.5 L V8	Y	14	Header
33 DNF	GTC	66	(United States) TRG	(United States) Ben Keating (Republic of Ireland) Damien Faulkner	Porsche 911 GT3 Cup	Y	4	Spun Off
33 DNF	GTC	66	(United States) TRG	(United States) Ben Keating (Republic of Ireland) Damien Faulkner	Porsche 4.0 L Flat-6	Y	4	Spun Off

Tyre manufacturers
Key
Symbol	Tyre manufacturer
**B**	Bridgestone
**C**	Continental
**FAL**	Falken Tire
**MI**	Michelin
**Y**	Yokohama

American Le Mans Series
Previous race: SportsCar Grand Prix	2013 season	Next race: Baltimore Sports Car Challenge
