= 2013 Baltimore Sports Car Challenge =

Sports car race

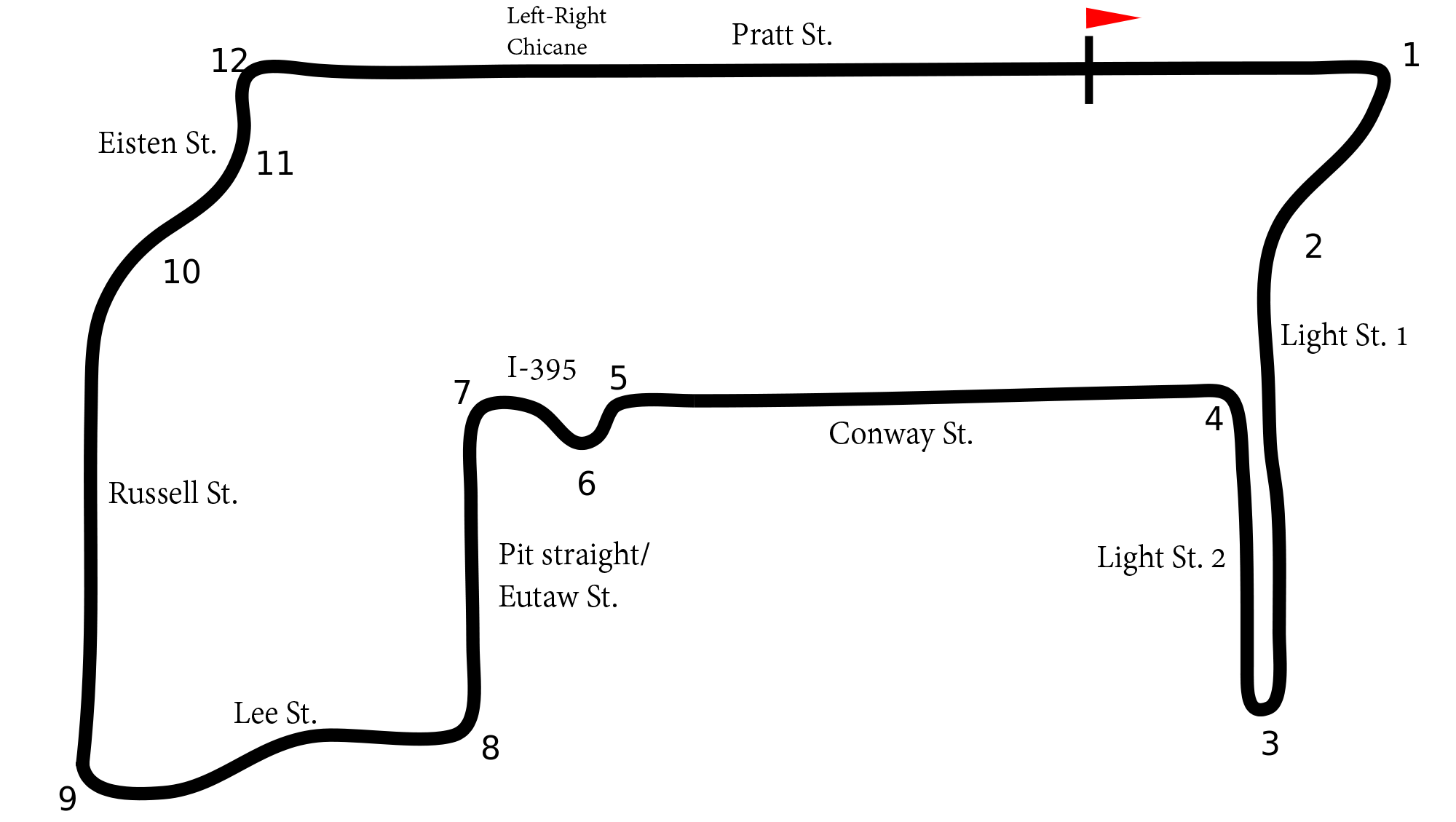
Track map of Baltimore Street Circuit (2012–2013)

The 2013 Baltimore Sports Car Challenge was a sports car race held at Baltimore street circuit in Baltimore, Maryland on August 31, 2013. The race was the seventh round of the 2013 American Le Mans Series.

== Background ==
=== Preview ===
American Le Mans Series (ALMS) president Scott Atherton confirmed the race was part of the schedule for the 2013 American Le Mans Series schedule in October 2012. It was the third consecutive year the event was held as part of the American Le Mans Series. The 2013 Baltimore Sports Car Challenge was the seventh of ten scheduled sports car races of 2013 American Le Mans Series. It was held at the twelve-turn 2.04 mi (3.28 km) Baltimore Street Circuit Baltimore, Maryland on August 31, 2013.

== Qualifying ==
=== Qualifying results ===
Pole positions in each class are indicated in bold and by ‡.

Pos.	Class	No.	Entry	Driver	Time	Gap	Grid
1	**P1**	**6**	**(United States) Muscle Milk Pickett Racing**	**(Germany) Klaus Graf**	**1:25.290**	—	1
2	P1	16	(United States) Dyson Racing Team	(United States) Chris Dyson	1:26.750	+1.460	2
3	**P2**	**551**	**(United States) Level 5 Motorsports**	**(Australia) Ryan Briscoe**	**1:27.170**	**+1.880**	3‡
4	P2	02	(United States) Extreme Speed Motorsports	(United States) Johannes van Overbeek	1:27.669	+2.379	4
5	P2	01	(United States) Extreme Speed Motorsports	(United States) Scott Sharp	1:27.818	+2.528	5
6	**PC**	**52**	**(United States) PR1/Mathiasen Motorsports**	**(United States) Dane Cameron**	**1:28.235**	**+2.945**	6‡
7	P2	552	(United States) Level 5 Motorsports	(United Kingdom) Marino Franchitti	1:28.335	+3.045	7
8	PC	8	(United States) BAR1 Motorsports	(Canada) Kyle Marcelli	1:28.518	+3.228	8
9	PC	05	(United States) CORE Autosport	(United States) Colin Braun	1:28.716	+3.426	9
10	PC	9	(United States) RSR Racing	(Brazil) Bruno Junqueira	1:29.081	+3.791	10
11	**GT**	**55**	**(United States) BMW Team RLL**	**(United States) Bill Auberlen**	**1:29.560**	**+4.270**	11‡
12	GT	56	(United States) BMW Team RLL	(United States) Joey Hand	1:29.795	+4.505	12
13	GT	4	(United States) Corvette Racing	(United States) Tommy Milner	1:30.007	+4.717	13
14	GT	06	(United States) CORE Autosport	(United States) Patrick Long	1:30.104	+4.814	14
15	GT	3	(United States) Corvette Racing	(Denmark) Jan Magnussen	1:30.132	+4.842	15
16	GT	17	(United States) Team Falken Tire	(Germany) Wolf Henzler	1:30.238	+4.948	16
17	GT	91	(United States) SRT Motorsports	(Belgium) Marc Goossens	1:30.599	+5.309	17
18	GT	62	(United States) Risi Competizione	(Monaco) Olivier Beretta	1:30.900	+5.610	18
19	GT	48	(United States) Paul Miller Racing	(Germany) Marco Holzer	1:31.352	+6.062	19
20	GT	93	(United States) SRT Motorsports	(Canada) Kuno Wittmer	1:31.358	+6.068	20
21	GT	23	(United States) Team West/AJR/Boardwalk Ferrari	(United States) Townsend Bell	1:31.494	+6.204	21
22	PC	18	(United States) Performance Tech Motorsports	(United States) Tristan Nunez	1:32.234	+6.944	22
23	**GTC**	**22**	**(United States) Alex Job Racing**	**(Netherlands) Jeroen Bleekemolen**	**1:34.322**	**+9.032**	23‡
24	GTC	45	(United States) Flying Lizard Motorsports	(United States) Spencer Pumpelly	1:34.515	+9.225	24
25	GTC	30	(United States) NGT Motorsport	(United Kingdom) Sean Edwards	1:34.602	+9.312	25
26	GTC	66	(United States) TRG	(Republic of Ireland) Damien Faulkner	1:34.781	+9.491	26
27	PC	7	(United States) BAR1 Motorsports	(United States) Rusty Mitchell	1:34.905	+9.615	27^{1}
28	GTC	68	(United States) TRG	(France) Kévin Estre	1:34.949	+9.659	28
29	GTC	11	(United States) JDX Racing	(Belgium) Jan Heylen	1:35.371	+10.081	29
30	GTC	44	(United States) Flying Lizard Motorsports	(South Africa) Dion von Moltke	1:35.496	+10.206	30
31	GTC	27	(United States) Dempsey Racing/Del Piero	(United States) Andy Lally	1:35.501	+10.211	31
32	GTC	67	(United States) TRG	Did Not Participate			32

- ^{1} The No. 7 BAR1 Motorsports entry had its fastest lap deleted as penalty for causing a red flag during its qualifying session.

== Race ==
=== Race results ===
Class winners in bold and ‡. Cars failing to complete 70% of their class winner's distance are marked as Not Classified (NC).

Pos	Class	No.	Team	Drivers	Chassis	Tire	Laps	Time/Retired
Pos	Class	No.	Team	Drivers	Engine	Tire	Laps	Time/Retired
1	**P1**	**6**	**(United States) Muscle Milk Pickett Racing**	**(Germany) Klaus Graf (Germany) Lucas Luhr**	**HPD ARX-03c**	MI	**41**	**1:31:38.287‡**
1	**P1**	**6**	**(United States) Muscle Milk Pickett Racing**	**(Germany) Klaus Graf (Germany) Lucas Luhr**	**Honda LM-V8 3.4 L V8**	MI	**41**	**1:31:38.287‡**
2	P1	16	(United States) Dyson Racing Team	(United States) Chris Dyson (United Kingdom) Guy Smith	Lola B12/60	MI	41	+3.867
2	P1	16	(United States) Dyson Racing Team	(United States) Chris Dyson (United Kingdom) Guy Smith	Mazda MZR-R 2.0 L Turbo I4 (Isobutanol)	MI	41	+3.867
3	**P2**	**552**	**(United States) Level 5 Motorsports**	**(United States) Guy Cosmo (United Kingdom) Marino Franchitti (United States) Scott Tucker**	**HPD ARX-03b**	MI	**41**	**+31.160‡**
3	**P2**	**552**	**(United States) Level 5 Motorsports**	**(United States) Guy Cosmo (United Kingdom) Marino Franchitti (United States) Scott Tucker**	**Honda HR28TT 2.8 L Turbo V6**	MI	**41**	**+31.160‡**
4	P2	01	(United States) Extreme Speed Motorsports	(United States) Anthony Lazzaro (United States) Scott Sharp	HPD ARX-03b	MI	41	+40.383
4	P2	01	(United States) Extreme Speed Motorsports	(United States) Anthony Lazzaro (United States) Scott Sharp	Honda HR28TT 2.8 L Turbo V6	MI	41	+40.383
5	**GT**	**3**	**(United States) Corvette Racing**	**(Denmark) Jan Magnussen (Spain) Antonio García**	**Chevrolet Corvette C6.R**	MI	**41**	**+41.530‡**
5	**GT**	**3**	**(United States) Corvette Racing**	**(Denmark) Jan Magnussen (Spain) Antonio García**	**Chevrolet 5.5 L V8**	MI	**41**	**+41.530‡**
6	GT	4	(United States) Corvette Racing	(United Kingdom) Oliver Gavin (United States) Tommy Milner	Chevrolet Corvette C6.R	MI	41	+41.987
6	GT	4	(United States) Corvette Racing	(United Kingdom) Oliver Gavin (United States) Tommy Milner	Chevrolet 5.5 L V8	MI	41	+41.987
7	GT	56	(United States) BMW Team RLL	(United States) Joey Hand (Germany) Dirk Müller	BMW Z4 GTE	MI	41	+42.911
7	GT	56	(United States) BMW Team RLL	(United States) Joey Hand (Germany) Dirk Müller	BMW 4.4 L V8	MI	41	+42.911
8	GT	55	(United States) BMW Team RLL	(United States) Bill Auberlen (Belgium) Maxime Martin	BMW Z4 GTE	MI	41	+56.627
8	GT	55	(United States) BMW Team RLL	(United States) Bill Auberlen (Belgium) Maxime Martin	BMW 4.4 L V8	MI	41	+56.627
9	GT	91	(United States) SRT Motorsports	(Belgium) Marc Goossens (Germany) Dominik Farnbacher	SRT Viper GTS-R	MI	41	+1:01.527
9	GT	91	(United States) SRT Motorsports	(Belgium) Marc Goossens (Germany) Dominik Farnbacher	SRT 8.0 L V10	MI	41	+1:01.527
10	**PC**	**18**	**(United States) Performance Tech Motorsports**	**(United States) Tristan Nunez (United States) Charlie Shears**	**Oreca FLM09**	C	**41**	**+1:07.281‡**
10	**PC**	**18**	**(United States) Performance Tech Motorsports**	**(United States) Tristan Nunez (United States) Charlie Shears**	**Chevrolet 6.2 L V8**	C	**41**	**+1:07.281‡**
11	GT	93	(United States) SRT Motorsports	(Canada) Kuno Wittmer (United States) Jonathan Bomarito	SRT Viper GTS-R	MI	41	+1:09.580
11	GT	93	(United States) SRT Motorsports	(Canada) Kuno Wittmer (United States) Jonathan Bomarito	SRT 8.0 L V10	MI	41	+1:09.580
12	PC	05	(United States) CORE Autosport	(United States) Jon Bennett (United States) Colin Braun	Oreca FLM09	C	40	+1 lap
12	PC	05	(United States) CORE Autosport	(United States) Jon Bennett (United States) Colin Braun	Chevrolet 6.2 L V8	C	40	+1 lap
13	**GTC**	**44**	**(United States) Flying Lizard Motorsports**	**(United States) Seth Neiman (South Africa) Dion von Moltke**	**Porsche 911 GT3 Cup**	Y	**39**	**+2 Laps‡**
13	**GTC**	**44**	**(United States) Flying Lizard Motorsports**	**(United States) Seth Neiman (South Africa) Dion von Moltke**	**Porsche 4.0 L Flat-6**	Y	**39**	**+2 Laps‡**
14	GTC	22	(United States) Alex Job Racing	(United States) Cooper MacNeil (Netherlands) Jeroen Bleekemolen	Porsche 911 GT3 Cup	Y	39	+2 Laps
14	GTC	22	(United States) Alex Job Racing	(United States) Cooper MacNeil (Netherlands) Jeroen Bleekemolen	Porsche 4.0 L Flat-6	Y	39	+2 Laps
15	GTC	11	(United States) JDX Racing	(United States) Mike Hedlund (Belgium) Jan Heylen	Porsche 911 GT3 Cup	Y	39	+2 Laps
15	GTC	11	(United States) JDX Racing	(United States) Mike Hedlund (Belgium) Jan Heylen	Porsche 4.0 L Flat-6	Y	39	+2 Laps
16	GTC	27	(United States) Dempsey Racing/Del Piero	(United States) Patrick Dempsey (United States) Andy Lally	Porsche 4.0 L Flat-6	Y	39	+2 Laps
16	GTC	27	(United States) Dempsey Racing/Del Piero	(United States) Patrick Dempsey (United States) Andy Lally	Porsche 4.0 L Flat-6	Y	39	+2 Laps
17	GTC	30	(United States) NGT Motorsport	(United States) Henrique Cisneros (United Kingdom) Sean Edwards	Porsche 911 GT3 Cup	Y	39	+2 Laps
17	GTC	30	(United States) NGT Motorsport	(United States) Henrique Cisneros (United Kingdom) Sean Edwards	Porsche 4.0 L Flat-6	Y	39	+2 Laps
18	GTC	67	(United States) TRG	(United States) Marc Bunting (Austria) Norbert Siedler	Porsche 911 GT3 Cup	Y	39	+2 Laps
18	GTC	67	(United States) TRG	(United States) Marc Bunting (Austria) Norbert Siedler	Porsche 4.0 L Flat-6	Y	39	+2 Laps
19 DNF	PC	52	(United States) PR1/Mathiasen Motorsports	(United States) Dane Cameron (United States) Mike Guasch	Oreca FLM09	C	38	Suspension
19 DNF	PC	52	(United States) PR1/Mathiasen Motorsports	(United States) Dane Cameron (United States) Mike Guasch	Chevrolet 6.2 L V8	C	38	Suspension
20	GT	23	(United States) Team West/AJR/Boardwalk Ferrari	(United States) Townsend Bell (United States) Bill Sweedler	Ferrari 458 Italia GT2	Y	38	+3 Laps
20	GT	23	(United States) Team West/AJR/Boardwalk Ferrari	(United States) Townsend Bell (United States) Bill Sweedler	Ferrari 4.5 L V8	Y	38	+3 Laps
21	GTC	45	(United States) Flying Lizard Motorsports	(United States) Spencer Pumpelly (Venezuela) Nelson Canache Jr.	Porsche 911 GT3 Cup	Y	36	+5 Laps
21	GTC	45	(United States) Flying Lizard Motorsports	(United States) Spencer Pumpelly (Venezuela) Nelson Canache Jr.	Porsche 4.0 L Flat-6	Y	36	+5 Laps
22 DNF	PC	9	(United States) RSR Racing	(Brazil) Bruno Junqueira (Venezuela) Alex Popow	Oreca FLM09	C	27	Radiator
22 DNF	PC	9	(United States) RSR Racing	(Brazil) Bruno Junqueira (Venezuela) Alex Popow	Chevrolet 6.2 L V8	C	27	Radiator
23 DNF	GTC	68	(United States) TRG	(United States) Al Carter (France) Kévin Estre	Porsche 911 GT3 Cup	Y	26	Did Not Finish
23 DNF	GTC	68	(United States) TRG	(United States) Al Carter (France) Kévin Estre	Porsche 4.0 L Flat-6	Y	26	Did Not Finish
24 DNF	P2	02	(United States) Extreme Speed Motorsports	(United States) Ed Brown (United States) Johannes van Overbeek	HPD ARX-03b	MI	15	Electrical
24 DNF	P2	02	(United States) Extreme Speed Motorsports	(United States) Ed Brown (United States) Johannes van Overbeek	Honda HR28TT 2.8 L Turbo V6	MI	15	Electrical
25 DNF	GTC	66	(United States) TRG	(United States) Ben Keating (Republic of Ireland) Damien Faulkner	Porsche 911 GT3 Cup	Y	14	Did Not Finish
25 DNF	GTC	66	(United States) TRG	(United States) Ben Keating (Republic of Ireland) Damien Faulkner	Porsche 4.0 L Flat-6	Y	14	Did Not Finish
26 DNF	PC	8	(United States) BAR1 Motorsports	(Canada) Kyle Marcelli (Canada) Chris Cumming	Oreca FLM09	C	3	Crash
26 DNF	PC	8	(United States) BAR1 Motorsports	(Canada) Kyle Marcelli (Canada) Chris Cumming	Chevrolet 6.2 L V8	C	3	Crash
27 DNF	P2	551	(United States) Level 5 Motorsports	(United States) Scott Tucker (Australia) Ryan Briscoe	HPD ARX-03b	MI	0	Crash
27 DNF	P2	551	(United States) Level 5 Motorsports	(United States) Scott Tucker (Australia) Ryan Briscoe	Honda HR28TT 2.8 L Turbo V6	MI	0	Crash
28 DNF	GT	06	(United States) CORE Autosport	(United States) Patrick Long (United Kingdom) Tom Kimber-Smith	Porsche 911 GT3-RSR	MI	0	Crash
28 DNF	GT	06	(United States) CORE Autosport	(United States) Patrick Long (United Kingdom) Tom Kimber-Smith	Porsche 4.0 L Flat-6	MI	0	Crash
29 DNF	GT	17	(United States) Team Falken Tire	(United States) Bryan Sellers (Germany) Wolf Henzler	Porsche 911 GT3-RSR	FAL	0	Crash
29 DNF	GT	17	(United States) Team Falken Tire	(United States) Bryan Sellers (Germany) Wolf Henzler	Porsche 4.0 L Flat-6	FAL	0	Crash
30 DNF	GT	62	(United States) Risi Competizione	(Monaco) Olivier Beretta (Italy) Matteo Malucelli	Ferrari 458 Italia GT2	MI	0	Crash
30 DNF	GT	62	(United States) Risi Competizione	(Monaco) Olivier Beretta (Italy) Matteo Malucelli	Ferrari 4.5 L V8	MI	0	Crash
31 DNF	GT	48	(United States) Paul Miller Racing	(United States) Bryce Miller (Germany) Marco Holzer	Porsche 911 GT3-RSR	MI	0	Crash
31 DNF	GT	48	(United States) Paul Miller Racing	(United States) Bryce Miller (Germany) Marco Holzer	Porsche 4.0 L Flat-6	MI	0	Crash

Tyre manufacturers
Key
Symbol	Tyre manufacturer
**C**	Continental
**FAL**	Falken Tire
**MI**	Michelin
**Y**	Yokohama

American Le Mans Series
Previous race: Orion Energy Systems 245	2013 season	Next race: International Sports Car Weekend
