= 2013 12 Hours of Sebring =

61st 12 Hours of Sebring race

Track map of the Sebring International Raceway

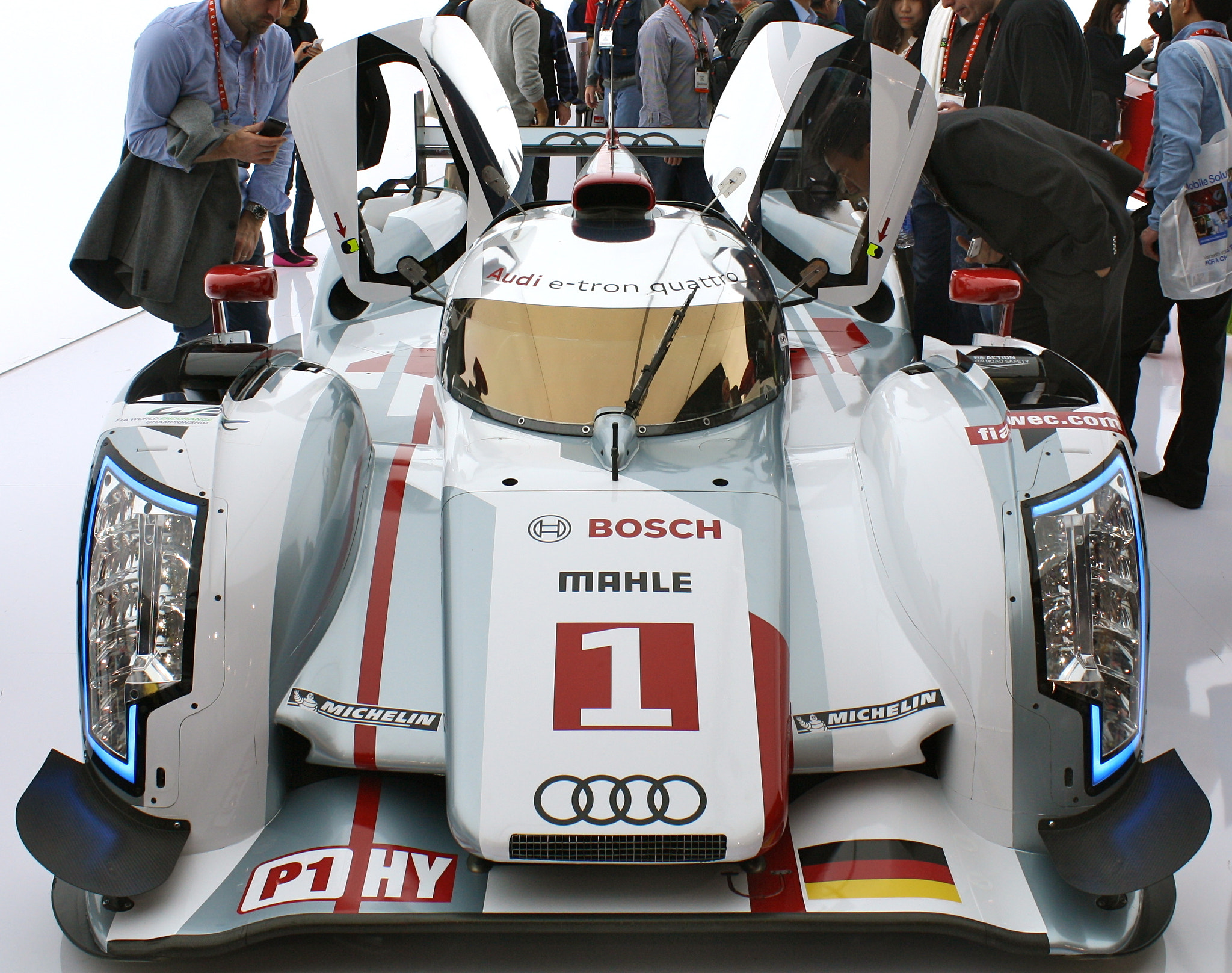
Audi R18

The 61st Mobil 1 12 Hours of Sebring was an endurance sports car race held on March 16, 2013, at the Sebring International Raceway in Florida, United States.

It was the last edition under the American Le Mans Series rules, marking the last year for the P1/LMP1 class at Sebring. The 2014 event was raced under the United SportsCar Racing brand.

== Background ==
=== Preview ===
American Le Mans Series (ALMS) president Scott Atherton confirmed the race was part of the schedule for the 2013 American Le Mans Series schedule in October 2012. It was the fifteenth consecutive year the event was held as part of the American Le Mans Series. The 2013 12 Hours of Sebring was the first of ten scheduled sports car races of 2013 American Le Mans Series. It was held at the 17-turn 3.741-mile (6.021 km) Sebring International Raceway in Sebring, Florida on March 16, 2013. Unlike in previous years where the event was run by the American Le Mans Series and FIA World Endurance Championship, the 2013 edition was an ALMS stand alone event.

== Qualifying ==
=== Qualifying result ===
Pole position winners in each class are marked in bold.

Pos	Class	Team	Driver	Lap Time	Grid
1	**P1**	**#1 Audi Sport Team Joest**	**Marcel Fässler**	**1:43.886**	**1**
2	P1	#2 Audi Sport Team Joest	Allan McNish	1:43.895	2
3	P1	#12 Rebellion Racing	Nick Heidfeld	1:46.456	3
4	P1	#6 Muscle Milk Pickett Racing	Klaus Graf	1:46.478	4
5	P1	#13 Rebellion Racing	Andrea Belicchi	1:46.689	5
6	P1	#16 Dyson Racing Team	Butch Leitzinger	1:48.407	6
7	**P2**	**#551 Level 5 Motorsports**	**Ryan Briscoe**	**1:51.159**	**7**
8	P2	#552 Level 5 Motorsports	Ryan Hunter-Reay	1:51.271	8
9	P2	#41 Greaves Motorsport	Tom Kimber-Smith	1:51.366	9
10	P2	#01 Extreme Speed Motorsports	David Brabham	1:52.703	10
11	P2	#02 Extreme Speed Motorsports	Johannes van Overbeek	1:53.074	11
12	**PC**	**#05 CORE Autosport**	**Colin Braun**	**1:53.404**	**12**
13	PC	#9 RSR Racing	Bruno Junqueira	1:53.674	13
14	PC	#81 DragonSpeed Mishumotors	Pierre Kaffer	1:53.838	14
15	P1	#0 DeltaWing Racing Cars	Olivier Pla	1:53.866	15
16	PC	#52 PR1/Mathiasen Motorsports	David Ostella	1:54.311	16
17	PC	#8 BAR1 Motorsports	Kyle Marcelli	1:54.520	17
18	PC	#500 Performance Tech Motorsports	Tristan Nunez	1:54.598	18
19	PC	#7 BAR1 Motorsports	Rusty Mitchell	1:55.282	19
20	**GT**	**#62 Risi Competizione**	**Gianmaria Bruni**	**1:58.815**	**20**
21	GT	#4 Corvette Racing	Oliver Gavin	1:58.934	21
22	GT	#97 Aston Martin Racing	Stefan Mücke	1:58.990	22
23	GT	#007 Aston Martin Racing	Pedro Lamy	1:59.208	23
24	GT	#3 Corvette Racing	Antonio García	1:59.348	24
25	GT	#93 SRT Motorsports	Jonathan Bomarito	1:59.430	25
26	GT	#48 Paul Miller Racing	Marco Holzer	1:59.543	26
27	GT	#55 BMW Team RLL	Maxime Martin	1:59.736	27
28	GT	#56 BMW Team RLL	Joey Hand	1:59.847	28
29	GT	#91 SRT Motorsports	Dominik Farnbacher	1:59.898	29
30	GT	#23 Team West/AJR/Boardwalk Ferrari	Leh Keen	2:00.308	30
31	GT	#17 Team Falken Tire	Wolf Henzler	2:00.365	31
32	**GTC**	**#27 Dempsey Racing**	**Andy Lally**	**2:05.446**	**32**
33	GTC	#22 Alex Job Racing	Jeroen Bleekemolen	2:05.747	33
34	GTC	#30 NGT Motorsport	Sean Edwards	2:05.747	34
35	GTC	#45 Flying Lizard Motorsports	Spencer Pumpelly	2:05.765	35
36	GTC	#66 TRG	Damien Faulkner	2:05.910	36
37	GTC	#11 JDX Racing	Jan Heylen	2:05.936	37
38	GTC	#44 Flying Lizard Motorsports	Alexandre Imperatori	2:06.059	38
39	GTC	#10 Dempsey Racing	Andrew Davis	2:06.219	39
40	GTC	#68 TRG	Kevin Éstre	2:06.246	40
41	GTC	#31 NGT Motorsport	Kuba Giermaziak	2:07.057	41
42	GTC	#99 Competition Motorsports	Lawson Aschenbach	2:07.366	42

== Race ==
=== Race result ===
Class winners in bold. Cars failing to complete 70% of their class winner's distance are marked as Not Classified (NC).

Pos	Class	No	Team	Drivers	Chassis	Tire	Laps
Pos	Class	No	Team	Drivers	Engine	Tire	Laps
1	**P1**	**1**	**(Germany) Audi Sport Team Joest**	**(Switzerland) Marcel Fässler (France) Benoît Tréluyer (United Kingdom) Oliver Jarvis**	**Audi R18 e-tron quattro**	MI	**364**
1	**P1**	**1**	**(Germany) Audi Sport Team Joest**	**(Switzerland) Marcel Fässler (France) Benoît Tréluyer (United Kingdom) Oliver Jarvis**	**Audi TDI 3.7 L Turbo V6 (Hybrid Diesel)**	MI	**364**
2	P1	2	(Germany) Audi Sport Team Joest	(United Kingdom) Allan McNish (Denmark) Tom Kristensen (Brazil) Lucas di Grassi	Audi R18 e-tron quattro	MI	364
2	P1	2	(Germany) Audi Sport Team Joest	(United Kingdom) Allan McNish (Denmark) Tom Kristensen (Brazil) Lucas di Grassi	Audi TDI 3.7 L Turbo V6 (Hybrid Diesel)	MI	364
3	P1	12	(Switzerland) Rebellion Racing	(Germany) Nick Heidfeld (Switzerland) Neel Jani (France) Nicolas Prost	Lola B12/60	MI	359
3	P1	12	(Switzerland) Rebellion Racing	(Germany) Nick Heidfeld (Switzerland) Neel Jani (France) Nicolas Prost	Toyota RV8KLM 3.4 L V8	MI	359
4	P1	6	(United States) Muscle Milk Pickett Racing	(Germany) Klaus Graf (Germany) Lucas Luhr (France) Romain Dumas	HPD ARX-03a	MI	358
4	P1	6	(United States) Muscle Milk Pickett Racing	(Germany) Klaus Graf (Germany) Lucas Luhr (France) Romain Dumas	Honda 3.4 L V8	MI	358
5	P1	13	(Switzerland) Rebellion Racing	(Switzerland) Mathias Beche (China) Congfu Cheng (Italy) Andrea Belicchi	Lola B12/60	MI	354
5	P1	13	(Switzerland) Rebellion Racing	(Switzerland) Mathias Beche (China) Congfu Cheng (Italy) Andrea Belicchi	Toyota RV8KLM 3.4 L V8	MI	354
6	**P2**	**551**	**(United States) Level 5 Motorsports**	**(United States) Scott Tucker (United Kingdom) Marino Franchitti (Australia) Ryan Briscoe**	**HPD ARX-03b**	MI	**346**
6	**P2**	**551**	**(United States) Level 5 Motorsports**	**(United States) Scott Tucker (United Kingdom) Marino Franchitti (Australia) Ryan Briscoe**	**Honda HR28TT 2.8 L Turbo V6**	MI	**346**
7	P2	552	(United States) Level 5 Motorsports	(United States) Scott Tucker (United States) Ryan Hunter-Reay (France) Simon Pagenaud	HPD ARX-03b	MI	345
7	P2	552	(United States) Level 5 Motorsports	(United States) Scott Tucker (United States) Ryan Hunter-Reay (France) Simon Pagenaud	Honda HR28TT 2.8 L Turbo V6	MI	345
8	P2	41	(United Kingdom) Greaves Motorsport	(United Kingdom) Tom Kimber-Smith (Germany) Christian Zugel (United States) Eric Lux	Zytek Z11SN	D	342
8	P2	41	(United Kingdom) Greaves Motorsport	(United Kingdom) Tom Kimber-Smith (Germany) Christian Zugel (United States) Eric Lux	Nissan VK45DE 4.5 L V8	D	342
9	**PC**	**52**	**(United States) PR1/Mathiasen Motorsports**	**(United States) David Cheng (United States) Mike Guasch (Canada) David Ostella**	**Oreca FLM09**	C	**336**
9	**PC**	**52**	**(United States) PR1/Mathiasen Motorsports**	**(United States) David Cheng (United States) Mike Guasch (Canada) David Ostella**	**Chevrolet 6.2 L V8**	C	**336**
10	PC	8	(United States) BAR1 Motorsports	(Canada) Kyle Marcelli (Canada) Chris Cumming (Sweden) Stefan Johansson	Oreca FLM09	C	336
10	PC	8	(United States) BAR1 Motorsports	(Canada) Kyle Marcelli (Canada) Chris Cumming (Sweden) Stefan Johansson	Chevrolet 6.2 L V8	C	336
11	PC	500	(United States) Performance Tech Motorsports	(United States) Tristan Nunez (United States) Charlie Shears (Denmark) David Heinemeier Hansson	Oreca FLM09	C	335
11	PC	500	(United States) Performance Tech Motorsports	(United States) Tristan Nunez (United States) Charlie Shears (Denmark) David Heinemeier Hansson	Chevrolet 6.2 L V8	C	335
12	PC	9	(United States) RSR Racing	(Brazil) Bruno Junqueira (Venezuela) Alex Popow (United States) Duncan Ende	Oreca FLM09	C	335
12	PC	9	(United States) RSR Racing	(Brazil) Bruno Junqueira (Venezuela) Alex Popow (United States) Duncan Ende	Chevrolet 6.2 L V8	C	335
13	P2	02	(United States) Extreme Speed Motorsports	(United States) Ed Brown (United States) Johannes van Overbeek (United States) Anthony Lazzaro	HPD ARX-03b	MI	335
13	P2	02	(United States) Extreme Speed Motorsports	(United States) Ed Brown (United States) Johannes van Overbeek (United States) Anthony Lazzaro	Honda HR28TT 2.8 L Turbo V6	MI	335
14	PC	05	(United States) CORE Autosport	(United States) Jon Bennett (United States) Colin Braun (Canada) Mark Wilkins	Oreca FLM09	C	334
14	PC	05	(United States) CORE Autosport	(United States) Jon Bennett (United States) Colin Braun (Canada) Mark Wilkins	Chevrolet 6.2 L V8	C	334
15	**GT**	**4**	**(United States) Corvette Racing**	**(United Kingdom) Oliver Gavin (United States) Tommy Milner (United Kingdom) Richard Westbrook**	**Chevrolet Corvette C6.R**	MI	**333**
15	**GT**	**4**	**(United States) Corvette Racing**	**(United Kingdom) Oliver Gavin (United States) Tommy Milner (United Kingdom) Richard Westbrook**	**Chevrolet 5.5 L V8**	MI	**333**
16	GT	62	(United States) Risi Competizione	(Monaco) Olivier Beretta (Italy) Matteo Malucelli (Italy) Gianmaria Bruni	Ferrari 458 Italia GT2	MI	333
16	GT	62	(United States) Risi Competizione	(Monaco) Olivier Beretta (Italy) Matteo Malucelli (Italy) Gianmaria Bruni	Ferrari 4.5 L V8	MI	333
17	GT	17	(United States) Team Falken Tire	(United States) Bryan Sellers (Germany) Wolf Henzler (United Kingdom) Nick Tandy	Porsche 997 GT3-RSR	FAL	332
17	GT	17	(United States) Team Falken Tire	(United States) Bryan Sellers (Germany) Wolf Henzler (United Kingdom) Nick Tandy	Porsche 4.0 L Flat-6	FAL	332
18	GT	55	(United States) BMW Team RLL	(United States) Bill Auberlen (Belgium) Maxime Martin (Germany) Jörg Müller	BMW Z4 GTE	MI	330
18	GT	55	(United States) BMW Team RLL	(United States) Bill Auberlen (Belgium) Maxime Martin (Germany) Jörg Müller	BMW 4.4 L V8	MI	330
19	GT	91	(United States) SRT Motorsports	(Belgium) Marc Goossens (United Kingdom) Ryan Dalziel (Germany) Dominik Farnbacher	SRT Viper GTS-R	MI	329
19	GT	91	(United States) SRT Motorsports	(Belgium) Marc Goossens (United Kingdom) Ryan Dalziel (Germany) Dominik Farnbacher	SRT 8.0 L V10	MI	329
20	GT	48	(United States) Paul Miller Racing	(United States) Bryce Miller (Germany) Marco Holzer (Austria) Richard Lietz	Porsche 997 GT3-RSR	MI	329
20	GT	48	(United States) Paul Miller Racing	(United States) Bryce Miller (Germany) Marco Holzer (Austria) Richard Lietz	Porsche 4.0 L Flat-6	MI	329
21	PC	7	(United States) BAR1 Motorsports	(United States) Tomy Drissi (United States) Rusty Mitchell (United States) Chapman Ducote	Oreca FLM09	C	326
21	PC	7	(United States) BAR1 Motorsports	(United States) Tomy Drissi (United States) Rusty Mitchell (United States) Chapman Ducote	Chevrolet 6.2 L V8	C	326
22	GT	56	(United States) BMW Team RLL	(United States) John Edwards (United States) Joey Hand (Germany) Dirk Müller	BMW Z4 GTE	MI	321
22	GT	56	(United States) BMW Team RLL	(United States) John Edwards (United States) Joey Hand (Germany) Dirk Müller	BMW 4.4 L V8	MI	321
23	GT	97	(United Kingdom) Aston Martin Racing	(United Kingdom) Darren Turner (Germany) Stefan Mücke (Brazil) Bruno Senna	Aston Martin Vantage GTE	MI	318
23	GT	97	(United Kingdom) Aston Martin Racing	(United Kingdom) Darren Turner (Germany) Stefan Mücke (Brazil) Bruno Senna	Aston Martin 4.5 L V8	MI	318
24	**GTC**	**22**	**(United States) Alex Job Racing**	**(United States) Cooper MacNeil (Netherlands) Jeroen Bleekemolen (South Africa) Dion von Moltke**	**Porsche 997 GT3 Cup**	Y	**315**
24	**GTC**	**22**	**(United States) Alex Job Racing**	**(United States) Cooper MacNeil (Netherlands) Jeroen Bleekemolen (South Africa) Dion von Moltke**	**Porsche 4.0 L Flat-6**	Y	**315**
25	GTC	45	(United States) Flying Lizard Motorsports	(United States) Brian Wong (United States) Spencer Pumpelly (Venezuela) Nelson Canache, Jr.	Porsche 997 GT3 Cup	Y	315
25	GTC	45	(United States) Flying Lizard Motorsports	(United States) Brian Wong (United States) Spencer Pumpelly (Venezuela) Nelson Canache, Jr.	Porsche 4.0 L Flat-6	Y	315
26	GTC	30	(United States) NGT Motorsport	(United States) Henrique Cisneros (United Kingdom) Sean Edwards (Germany) Marco Seefried	Porsche 997 GT3 Cup	Y	314
26	GTC	30	(United States) NGT Motorsport	(United States) Henrique Cisneros (United Kingdom) Sean Edwards (Germany) Marco Seefried	Porsche 4.0 L Flat-6	Y	314
27	GTC	11	(United States) JDX Racing	(United States) Mike Hedlund (United States) Jon Fogarty (Belgium) Jan Heylen	Porsche 997 GT3 Cup	Y	314
27	GTC	11	(United States) JDX Racing	(United States) Mike Hedlund (United States) Jon Fogarty (Belgium) Jan Heylen	Porsche 4.0 L Flat-6	Y	314
28	GTC	66	(United States) TRG	(United States) Ben Keating (United States) Craig Stanton (Republic of Ireland) Damien Faulkner	Porsche 997 GT3 Cup	Y	313
28	GTC	66	(United States) TRG	(United States) Ben Keating (United States) Craig Stanton (Republic of Ireland) Damien Faulkner	Porsche 4.0 L Flat-6	Y	313
29	GTC	27	(United States) Dempsey Del Piero Racing	(United States) Patrick Dempsey (United States) Andy Lally (United States) Joe Foster	Porsche 997 GT3 Cup	Y	311
29	GTC	27	(United States) Dempsey Del Piero Racing	(United States) Patrick Dempsey (United States) Andy Lally (United States) Joe Foster	Porsche 4.0 L Flat-6	Y	311
30	GTC	10	(United States) Dempsey Del Piero Racing	(United States) Andrew Davis (United States) Bob Faieta (United States) Michael Avenatti	Porsche 997 GT3 Cup	Y	311
30	GTC	10	(United States) Dempsey Del Piero Racing	(United States) Andrew Davis (United States) Bob Faieta (United States) Michael Avenatti	Porsche 4.0 L Flat-6	Y	311
31	GTC	99	(United States) Competition Motorsports	(Australia) David Calvert-Jones (United States) Eric Curran (United States) Lawson Aschenbach	Porsche 997 GT3 Cup	Y	309
31	GTC	99	(United States) Competition Motorsports	(Australia) David Calvert-Jones (United States) Eric Curran (United States) Lawson Aschenbach	Porsche 4.0 L Flat-6	Y	309
32	GTC	44	(United States) Flying Lizard Motorsports	(Germany) Pierre Ehret (United States) Brett Sandberg (Switzerland) Alexandre Imperatori	Porsche 997 GT3 Cup	Y	309
32	GTC	44	(United States) Flying Lizard Motorsports	(Germany) Pierre Ehret (United States) Brett Sandberg (Switzerland) Alexandre Imperatori	Porsche 4.0 L Flat-6	Y	309
33	GT	007	(United Kingdom) Aston Martin Racing	(Canada) Paul Dalla Lana (United States) Billy Johnson (Portugal) Pedro Lamy	Aston Martin Vantage GTE	MI	307
33	GT	007	(United Kingdom) Aston Martin Racing	(Canada) Paul Dalla Lana (United States) Billy Johnson (Portugal) Pedro Lamy	Aston Martin 4.5 L V8	MI	307
34	GT	93	(United States) SRT Motorsports	(United States) Tommy Kendall (United States) Jonathan Bomarito (Canada) Kuno Wittmer	SRT Viper GTS-R	MI	303
34	GT	93	(United States) SRT Motorsports	(United States) Tommy Kendall (United States) Jonathan Bomarito (Canada) Kuno Wittmer	SRT 8.0 L V10	MI	303
35	GTC	31	(United States) NGT Motorsport	(Germany) Mario Farnbacher (Poland) Kuba Giermaziak (Colombia) Carlos Gómez	Porsche 997 GT3 Cup	Y	301
35	GTC	31	(United States) NGT Motorsport	(Germany) Mario Farnbacher (Poland) Kuba Giermaziak (Colombia) Carlos Gómez	Porsche 4.0 L Flat-6	Y	301
36	PC	81	(United States) DragonSpeed Mishumotors	(Germany) Mirco Schultis (Germany) Patrick Simon (Germany) Pierre Kaffer	Oreca FLM09	C	286
36	PC	81	(United States) DragonSpeed Mishumotors	(Germany) Mirco Schultis (Germany) Patrick Simon (Germany) Pierre Kaffer	Chevrolet 6.2 L V8	C	286
37	P2	01	(United States) Extreme Speed Motorsports	(United States) Scott Sharp (United States) Guy Cosmo (Australia) David Brabham	HPD ARX-03b	MI	281
37	P2	01	(United States) Extreme Speed Motorsports	(United States) Scott Sharp (United States) Guy Cosmo (Australia) David Brabham	Honda HR28TT 2.8 L Turbo V6	MI	281
38	GTC	68	(United States) TRG	(United States) Al Carter (United States) Carlos de Quesada (France) Kevin Estre	Porsche 997 GT3 Cup	Y	269
38	GTC	68	(United States) TRG	(United States) Al Carter (United States) Carlos de Quesada (France) Kevin Estre	Porsche 4.0 L Flat-6	Y	269
39 DNF	GT	3	(United States) Corvette Racing	(Denmark) Jan Magnussen (Spain) Antonio García (United States) Jordan Taylor	Chevrolet Corvette C6.R	MI	213
39 DNF	GT	3	(United States) Corvette Racing	(Denmark) Jan Magnussen (Spain) Antonio García (United States) Jordan Taylor	Chevrolet 5.5 L V8	MI	213
40 DNF	GT	23	(United States) Team West/AJR/Boardwalk Ferrari	(United States) Townsend Bell (United States) Bill Sweedler (United States) Leh Keen	Ferrari 458 Italia GT2	Y	209
40 DNF	GT	23	(United States) Team West/AJR/Boardwalk Ferrari	(United States) Townsend Bell (United States) Bill Sweedler (United States) Leh Keen	Ferrari 4.5 L V8	Y	209
41 DNF	P1	16	(United States) Dyson Racing Team	(United States) Chris Dyson (United States) Butch Leitzinger (United Kingdom) Guy Smith	Lola B12/60	MI	81
41 DNF	P1	16	(United States) Dyson Racing Team	(United States) Chris Dyson (United States) Butch Leitzinger (United Kingdom) Guy Smith	Mazda MZR-R 2.0 L Turbo I4 (Butanol)	MI	81
42 DNF	P1	0	(United States) DeltaWing Racing Cars	(France) Olivier Pla (United Kingdom) Andy Meyrick	DeltaWing LM12	B	9
42 DNF	P1	0	(United States) DeltaWing Racing Cars	(France) Olivier Pla (United Kingdom) Andy Meyrick	Élan 1.9 L Turbo I4	B	9

Tyre manufacturers
Key
Symbol	Tyre manufacturer
B	Bridgestone
C	Continental
D	Dunlop
FAL	Falken Tire
MI	Michelin
Y	Yokohama

American Le Mans Series
Previous race: None	2013 season	Next race: American Le Mans Series at Long Beach
