= Lola B12/60 =

Le Mans Prototype racing car

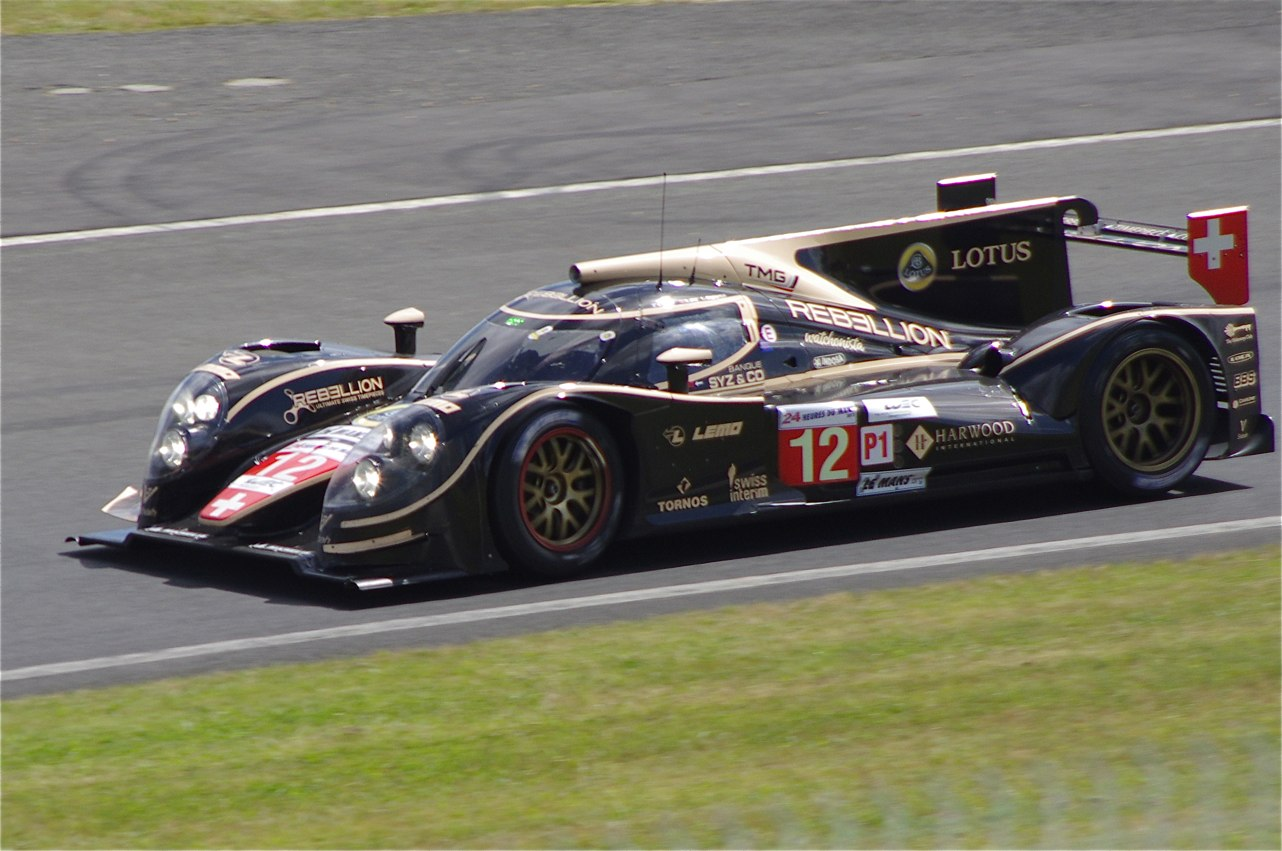
- Rebellion Racing's Lola B12/60 2012 24 Hours of Le Mans.
- Category: Le Mans Prototype (LMP1)
- Constructor: Lola Cars International
- Designer(s): Julian Sole
- Predecessor: Lola B08/60
- Successor: Rebellion R-One

Technical specifications
- Chassis: carbon-fibre composite monocoque with semi-stressed engine
- Suspension (front): double wishbones, push-rod actuated springs and dampers, anti-roll bar
- Suspension (rear): double wishbones, push-rod actuated springs and dampers, anti-roll bar
- Length: 4,648 mm (183 in)
- Width: 1,980 mm (78 in)
- Height: 1,016 mm (40 in)
- Engine: Toyota V8KLM 3.4 L V8 3.4-litre V8; Mazda MZR-R 2.0 L Turbo I-4 mid, longitudinally mounted
- Transmission: 6 speed Sequential
- Power: 525 hp (391 kW)
- Weight: 900 kg (1,984 lb)
- Brakes: carbon ceramic discs
- Tyres: Michelin; Dunlop

Competition history
- Notable entrants: (Switzerland) Rebellion Racing (United States) Dyson Racing
- Debut: 2012 12 Hours of Sebring
- First win: 2012 12 Hours of Sebring
- Last win: 2014 6 Hours of Silverstone
- Last event: 2014 6 Hours of Silverstone
Races	Wins
37	5

Lola B12/60 is a Le Mans prototype built in 2012 by British Lola Racing Cars in England to compete in the FIA World Endurance Championship. It has been entered by the Rebellion Racing team in the FIA Endurance World Championship since the 2012 season and has also been used, to a lesser extent, in the American Le Mans Series (ALMS) championship. It has also been used by the Dyson Racing in the ALMS since 2012.

== Competition history ==
=== Complete American Le Mans Series results ===
(key) Races in bold indicates pole position. Races in italics indicates fastest lap.

Complete American Le Mans Series results
Year	Entrant	Class	Drivers	No.	Rds.	Rounds										Pts.	Pos.
Year	Entrant	Class	Drivers	No.	Rds.	1	2	3	4	5	6	7	8	9	10	Pts.	Pos.
2012	(Switzerland) Rebellion Racing	P1	(Italy) Andrea Belicchi (Switzerland) Neel Jani (France) Nicolas Prost	12	10; 10; 10	SEB	LBH	LGA	LRP	MOS	MOH	RAM	BGP	VIR	PLM; 1	0	NC
2012	(United States) Dyson Racing Team	P1	(United States) Chris Dyson (United Kingdom) Guy Smith (United Kingdom) Steven Kane (United Kingdom) Johnny Mowlem	16	All; All; 1, 10; 3	SEB; 1	**LBH**; **2**	LGA; 2	**LRP**; **2**	MOS; 2	MOH; 2	RAM; 1	BGP; 2	VIR; 2	PLM; 2	190	2nd
2013	(Switzerland) Rebellion Racing	P1	(Germany) Nick Heidfeld (Switzerland) Neel Jani (France) Nicolas Prost	12	1-3, 10; 1-3, 10; 1, 10	SEB; 3	**LBH**; **2**	**LAG**; **2**	LRP	MOS	ELK	BAL	COA	VIR	**PET**; **1**	82	3rd
2013	(Switzerland) Rebellion Racing	P1	(Switzerland) Mathias Beche (China) Congfu Cheng (Italy) Andrea Belicchi	13	1; 1; 1	SEB; 5	LBH	LAG	LRP	MOS	ELK	BAL	COA	VIR	PET	82	3rd
2013	(United States) Dyson Racing Team	P1	(United Kingdom) Guy Smith (United States) Chris Dyson (United States) Butch Leitzinger (Canada) Tony Burgess (United States) Chris McMurry (United Kingdom) Johnny Mowlem	16	1-4, 7, 9; 1-4, 7, 10; 1; 5-6, 8, 10; 5-6, 8, 10; 9	SEB; Ret	LBH; Ret	LAG; Ret	LRP; 2	MOS; 2	ELK; 2	BAL; 2	COA; 2	**VIR**; **2**	PET; 2	116	2nd
