= Tristan Nunez =

American racing driver

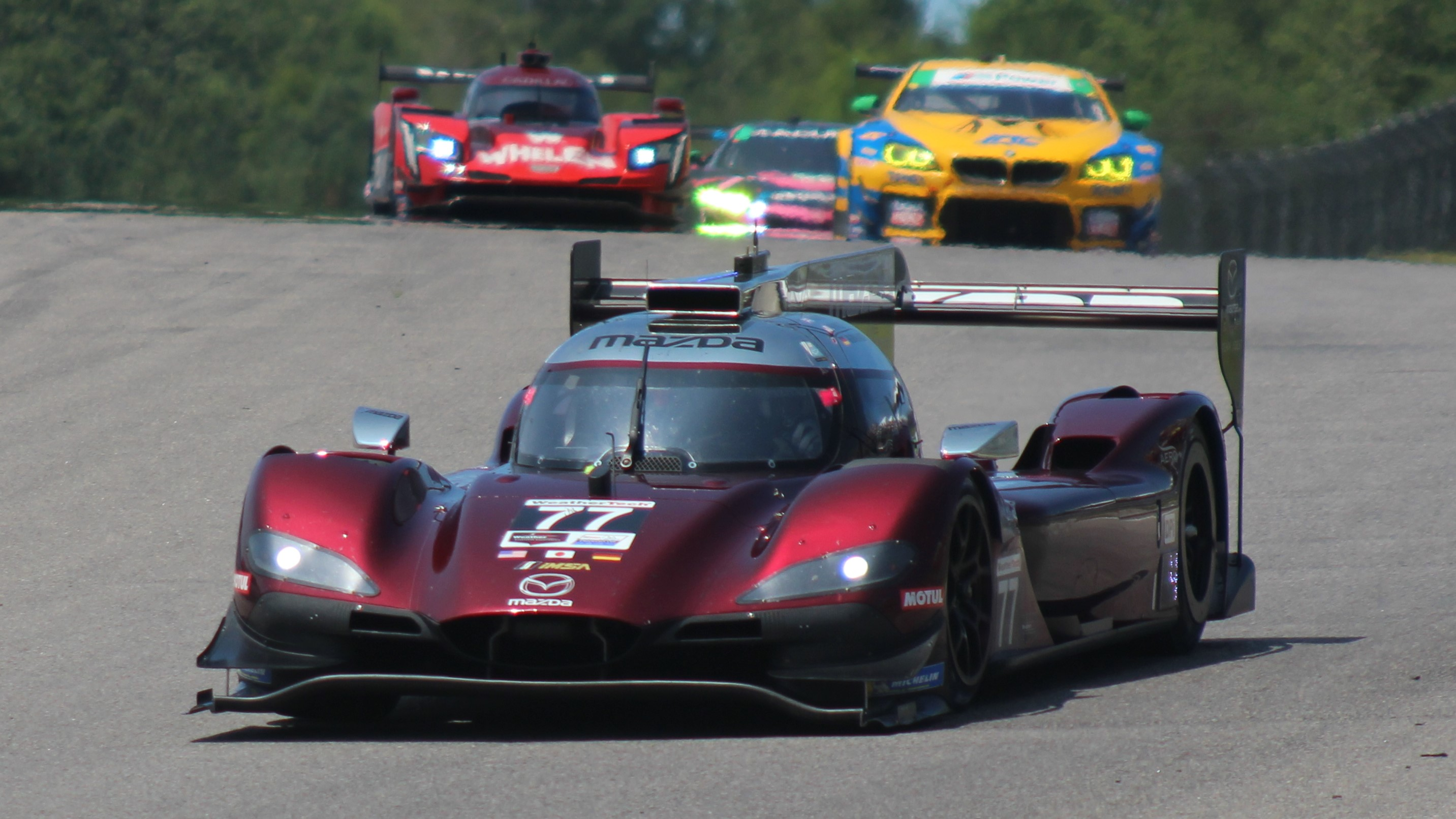
- Nunez in 2019
- Nationality: (United States) American
- Born: October 31, 1995 (age 31) Boynton Beach, Florida, U.S.

WeatherTech SportsCar Championship career
- Debut season: 2014
- Current team: Mazda Team Joest
- Categorisation: FIA Gold
- Car number: 77
- Starts: 64
- Championships: 0
- Wins: 1
- Best finish: 5th in 2020
- Finished last season: 7th (2020)

Previous series
- 2013 2013: American Le Mans; Rolex Sports Car Series

Tristan Nunez (born October 31, 1995 in Boynton Beach, Florida) is an American racing driver from Boca Raton, Florida. He is the son of Juan Nunez, a former professional tennis player and coach. Nunez has a fraternal twin brother, Dylan, who was a globally ranked junior tennis player, and is now an aspiring actor.

Nunez began his racing career in the Skip Barber Summer Series in 2011 where he won the championship. In 2012 he was the 2012 Cooper Tires Prototype Lites champion and won the Team USA Scholarship to compete in the Formula Ford Festival. In 2013, he became the youngest class winner in Rolex Sports Car Series history, driving a Speedsource Mazda6 in the GX class. Driving with Charlie Shears and David Heinemeier Hansson, he finished 11th in the American Le Mans Series' 2013 12 Hours of Sebring where he competes in the LeMans Prototype Challenge class for Performance Tech Motorsports.

For 2014, Nunez was signed as a Mazda factory driver in the United SportsCar Championship.

For 2015, Nunez was a factory driver for Mazda Motorsports / SpeedSource in the Mazda SKYACTIV diesel prototype.

During his 2021 season he competed in the Michelin Le Mans Cup round at Le Mans with co-driver Steven Thomas. They completed the two 1 hour races in a Nielsen racing Ligier JSP320 as a one-off entry onto the 44 car grid. Qualifying 32nd and 15th respectively for the races, and finishing 8th in race two after recording a DNF in race one.

== Racing record ==
=== Complete WeatherTech SportsCar Championship ===
Year	Team	No.	Class	Chassis	Engine	1	2	3	4	5	6	7	8	9	10	11	Rank	Points	Ref
2014	SpeedSource	07	P	Mazda Prototype	Mazda 2.2 L SKYACTIV-D (SH-VPTS) I4 Turbo (diesel)	DAY; 13	SIR; 16	LBH; 8	LGA; 12	DET; 8	WGL; 9	MSP; 6	IND; 9	ELK; 9	COA; 9	PET; 11	11th	208	
2015	SpeedSource	70	P	Mazda Prototype	Mazda 2.2 L SKYACTIV-D (SH-VPTS) I4 Turbo (diesel)	DAY; 12	SEB; 10	LBH; 8	LGA; 6	DET	WGL	MOS	ELK	COA; 8	PET; 7		9th	141	
2016	Mazda Motorsports	55	P	Mazda Prototype	Mazda MZ-2.0T 2.0 L I4 Turbo	DAY; 10	SEB; 6	LBH; 5	LGA; 4	DET; 3	WGL; 8	MOS; 8	ELK; 5	COA; 8	PET; 9		7th	257	
2017	Mazda Motorsports	55	P	Mazda RT24-P	Mazda MZ-2.0T 2.0 L Turbo I4	DAY; 11	SEB; 5	LBH; 3	COA; 10	DET; 5	WGL; 3	MOS; 4	ELK	LGA	PET		10th	181	
2018	Mazda Team Joest	77	P	Mazda RT24-P	Mazda MZ-2.0T 2.0 L Turbo I4	DAY; 17	SEB; 8	LBH; 4	MDO; 3	DET; 9	WGL; 13	MOS; 6	ELK; 11	LGA; 9	PET; 2		8th	234	
2019	Mazda Team Joest	77	DPi	Mazda RT24-P	Mazda MZ-2.0T 2.0 L Turbo I4	DAY; 11	SEB; 11	LBH; 4	MDO; 2	DET; 10	WGL; 2	MOS; 1	ELK; 3	LGA; 6	PET; 6		5th	268	
2020	Mazda Team Joest	77	DPi	Mazda RT24-P	Mazda MZ-2.0T 2.0 L Turbo I4	DAY; 2											7th	247	
2020	Mazda Motorsports	77	DPi	Mazda RT24-P	Mazda MZ-2.0T 2.0 L Turbo I4		DAY; 2	SEB; 4	ELK; 6	ATL; 7	MOH; 5	ATL; 7	LGA; 5	SEB; 3			7th	247	
2021	WIN Autosport	11	LMP2	Oreca 07	Gibson GK428 4.2 L V8	DAY; 10	DAY; 5†	SEB; 4	WGI; 1	WGL; 2	ELK; 5	LGA; 3	ATL; 3				2nd	2026	
2022	Whelen Engineering Racing	31	DPi	Cadillac DPi-V.R	Cadillac 5.5 L V8	DAY; 4	SEB; 3	LBH; 5	LGA; 3	MDO; 3	DET	WGL	CTM				7th	1575	
2022	PR1/Mathiasen Motorsports	11	LMP2	Oreca 07	Gibson GK428 4.2 L V8						ELK; 4	PET; 3					16th	650	
2023	Performance Tech Motorsports	38	LMP3	Ligier JS P320	Nissan VK56DE 5.6 L V8	DAY	SEB; 6	WGL	MOS	ELK	IMS	PET					32nd	275	
