= Damien Faulkner =

Irish racing driver (born 1977)

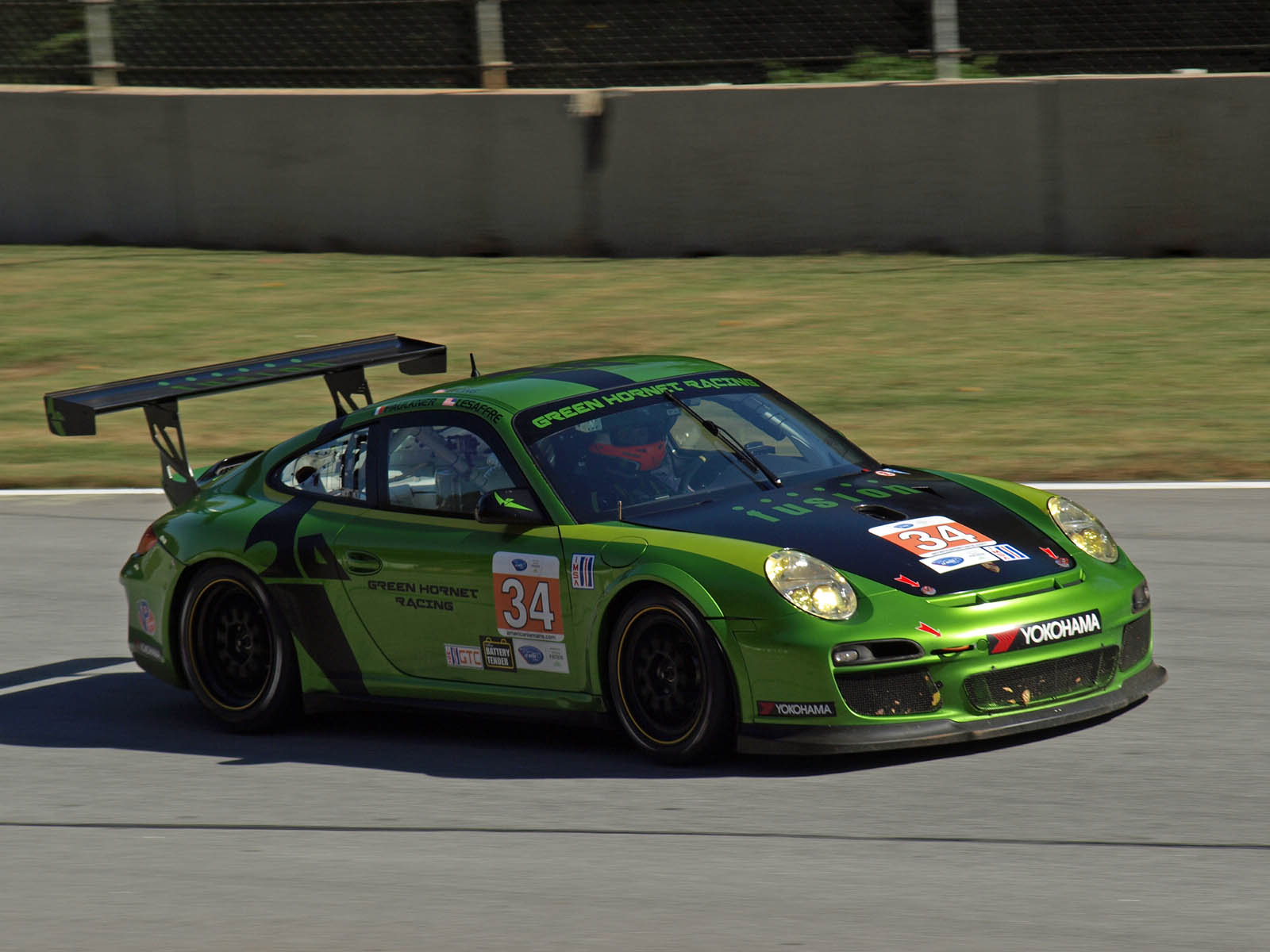
- Nationality: (Republic of Ireland) Irish
- Born: 15 February 1977 (age 49) Moville, County Donegal, Ireland

Porsche Supercup
- Categorisation: FIA Platinum (until 2012); FIA Gold (2013–2016); FIA Silver (2017–)
- Years active: 2002, 2006–2010
- Starts: 39
- Wins: 4
- Poles: 3
- Fastest laps: 3
- Best finish: 2nd in 2007, 2008

Previous series
- 2006 2001: British GT Championship; Indy Lights

Championship titles
- 2000: Formula Palmer Audi

Damien Faulkner (born 15 February 1977) is an Irish race car driver from Moville County Donegal. Beginning his professional career in Formula Vauxhall Junior in 1995, he competed in the Formula Ford Festival in 1996 and finished eleventh. He finished in third place in Vauxhall Junior in 1997 and moved to Formula Palmer Audi in 1998 where he finished sixth and third in series points in his first two seasons. At the end of 1999, he had his first taste of F3000 when he tested for Arden as part of his prize for finishing third in Palmer Audi.

In 2000, Faulkner dominated the new European Formula Palmer Audi series taking six wins on his way to the title. His prize for winning the series assisted him in finding a seat in the American Champ Car feeder series Indy Lights for 2001. In the series' final season he drove for Dorricott Racing, capturing two wins on his way to third place in series points. A return home to Mondello Park during the season also saw him win his class in a one-off FIA Sportscar Championship race.

Faulkner returned to Europe in 2002 and competed in a partial season in the Formula Nissan World Series. With nothing on the horizon for 2003, Faulkner's career was rescued by a dominant performance as a guest driver in the BTCC supporting Porsche Carrera Cup GB, again at his home circuit, Mondello Park. This drive led to a Porsche Supercup guest appearance and an invite to again compete at Mondello in 2004. A further strong drive secured a seat for the remainder of the season with Team SAS and Faulkner went on to take the team's first race win before the season's end. Two more years with the team brought two championship victories and a graduation in 2007 to the Porsche Supercup.

A successful debut Supercup season yielded two wins and second in the championship with the title fight going right down to the final race of the season. 2007's performances have put Faulkner firmly back on the map as he heads into a second season in the Supercup with Walter Lechner Racing and has also received invites to two of the biggest pre-season events on the calendar, the Dubai 24hrs and 24 Hours of Daytona.

Faulkner drove the Formula One medical car at the 2002 Malaysian Grand Prix and the safety car at the 2002 United States Grand Prix.

== Racing record ==
=== American open–wheel racing results ===
(key)

==== Indy Lights ====
Year	Team	1	2	3	4	5	6	7	8	9	10	11	12	Rank	Points	Ref
2001	Dorricott Racing	MTY; 7	LBH; 13	**TXS**; 1	MIL; 7	POR; 1	KAN; 2	TOR; 3	MOH; 3	GAT; 5	ATL; 3	LAG; 4	FON; 7	**3rd**	**141**	

=== Complete Porsche Supercup results ===
(key) (Races in bold indicate pole position – 2 points awarded 2008 onwards in all races) (Races in italics indicate fastest lap)

Year	Team	Car	1	2	3	4	5	6	7	8	9	10	11	12	13	DC	Points
2002	Porsche AG	Porsche 996 GT3	ITA	ESP	AUT	MON	GER	GBR; 11	GER	HUN	BEL	ITA	USA	USA		NC‡	0‡
2006	Priority Racing Team Lechner	Porsche 997 GT3	BHR; 15	ITA	GER	ESP	MON	GBR	USA	USA	FRA	GER	HUN	ITA		NC‡	0‡
2007	Lechner Racing Bahrain	Porsche 997 GT3	BHR; 1	**BHR**; 3	ESP; 4	MON; 6	FRA; 12	GBR; 5	GER; 4	HUN; 3	TUR; 2	**ITA**; 1	BEL; 3			**2nd**	**163**
2008	Lechner Racing	Porsche 997 GT3	BHR; 1	BHR; 10	ESP; 9	TUR; 5	MON; 2	FRA; Ret	GBR; Ret	GER; 4	**HUN**; 1	ESP; 3	BEL; 25†	ITA; 12		**2nd**	**121**
2009	Walter Lechner Racing	Porsche 997 GT3	BHR; 4	BHR; 6	ESP; 6	MON; 7	TUR; 12	GBR; 16	GER; 8	HUN; 5	ESP; Ret	BEL; 4	ITA; 5	UAE; 11	UAE; 4	6th	126
2010	Al Faisal Lechner Racing	Porsche 997 GT3	BHR	BHR	ESP	MON	ESP	GBR; 10	GER	HUN	BEL	ITA				NC‡	0‡

† — Did not finish the race, but was classified as he completed over 90% of the race distance.

‡ — Guest driver – Not eligible for points.

=== Complete WeatherTech SportsCar Championship results ===
(key) (Races in bold indicate pole position; results in italics indicate fastest lap)

Year	Team	Class	Make	Engine	1	2	3	4	5	6	7	8	9	10	11	Rank	Points	Ref
2014	GB Autosport	GTD	Porsche 911 GT America	Porsche 4.0 L Flat-6	DAY; 25†	SEB; 10	LGA; 17	DET; 9	WGL; 9	MOS; 4	IND; 16	ELK; 12†	VIR; 10	COA; 9	PET; 11	17th	196	
2015	GB Autosport	GTD	Porsche 911 GT America	Porsche 4.0 L Flat-6	DAY; 7	SEB; 13†	LGA	BEL	WGL	LIM	ELK	VIR	AUS	ATL		43rd	26	
2016	Riley Motorsports	GTD	Dodge Viper GT3-R	Dodge 8.3 L V10	DAY; 3	SEB	LGA	BEL	WGL	MOS	LIM	ELK	VIR	AUS	PET	38th	31	

^{†} Faulkner did not complete sufficient laps in order to score full points.

Sporting positions
Preceded by Richard Tarling	Formula Palmer Audi; Champion; 2000	Succeeded by Steve Warburton
Preceded by Richard Westbrook	Porsche Carrera Cup GB Champion; 2005-2006	Succeeded by James Sutton
