= Rusty Mitchell (racing driver) =

American racing driver

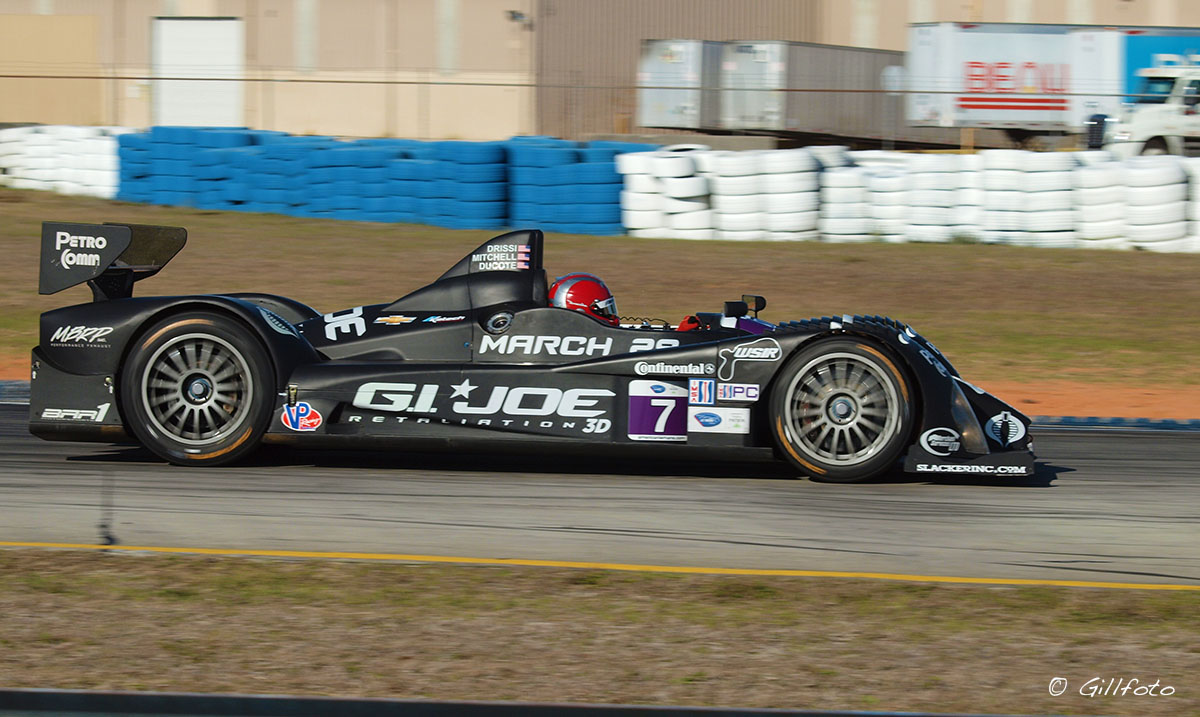
- Mitchell in 2013
- Nationality: (United States) American
- Born: November 29, 1982 (age 43) Midland, Texas, United States
- Categorisation: FIA Gold (until 2013); FIA Silver (2014–)

Rusty Mitchell (born November 29, 1982) is an American racing driver from Midland, Texas.

In 2007 and 2008, Mitchell drove in Formula SCCA competition, winning the June Sprints and Southwest Division title in 2007 and finishing second in the Southwest division in 2008. In 2008, he also made his Star Mazda Series debut driving for his own team in nine races and finishing seventeenth in the championship. In 2009, he drove full-time in Star Mazda and finished twelfth in points. In 2010, he returned to Star Mazda, merging his team with Juncos Racing in the middle of the season, he again finished ninth in the championship. In 2011, he has signed with Intersport Racing to drive in the American Le Mans Series' LMPC class and signed with Team E to make his Firestone Indy Lights debut at the Long Beach Grand Prix. He finished eleventh in the race. Later in the season, he signed to compete in the Freedom 100 for the team and four more late-season races.

== Racing results ==
=== Star Mazda Championship ===
Year	Team	1	2	3	4	5	6	7	8	9	10	11	12	13	Rank	Points
2008	Mitchell Motorsports	SEB	UTA	WGI	POR; 19	POR; 13	ROA; 21	TRR; 20	MOS; 11	NJ1; 14	NJ2; 18	ATL; 13	LAG; 9		17th	203
2009	Mitchell Motorsports	SEB; 11	VIR; 26	MMP; 16	NJ1; 25	NJ2; 25	WIS; 6	IOW; 4	ILL; 16	ILL; 13	QUE; 2	ONT; 11	ATL; 10	LAG; 17	12th	295
2010	Juncos Racing Mitchell Motorsports	SEB; 11	STP; 10	LAG; 8	ORP; 4	IOW; 10	NJ1; 20	NJ2; 10	ACC; 13	ACC; 6	TRO; 8	ROA; 5	MOS; 9	ATL; 12	9th	350

=== Indy Lights ===
Year	Team	1	2	3	4	5	6	7	8	9	10	11	12	13	14	Rank	Points
2011	Team E	STP	ALA	LBH; 11	INDY; 7	MIL	IOW	TOR	EDM	EDM	TRO	NHM; 8	BAL; 7	KTY; 8	LVS; 12	14th	137
