= Mazda MZR engine =

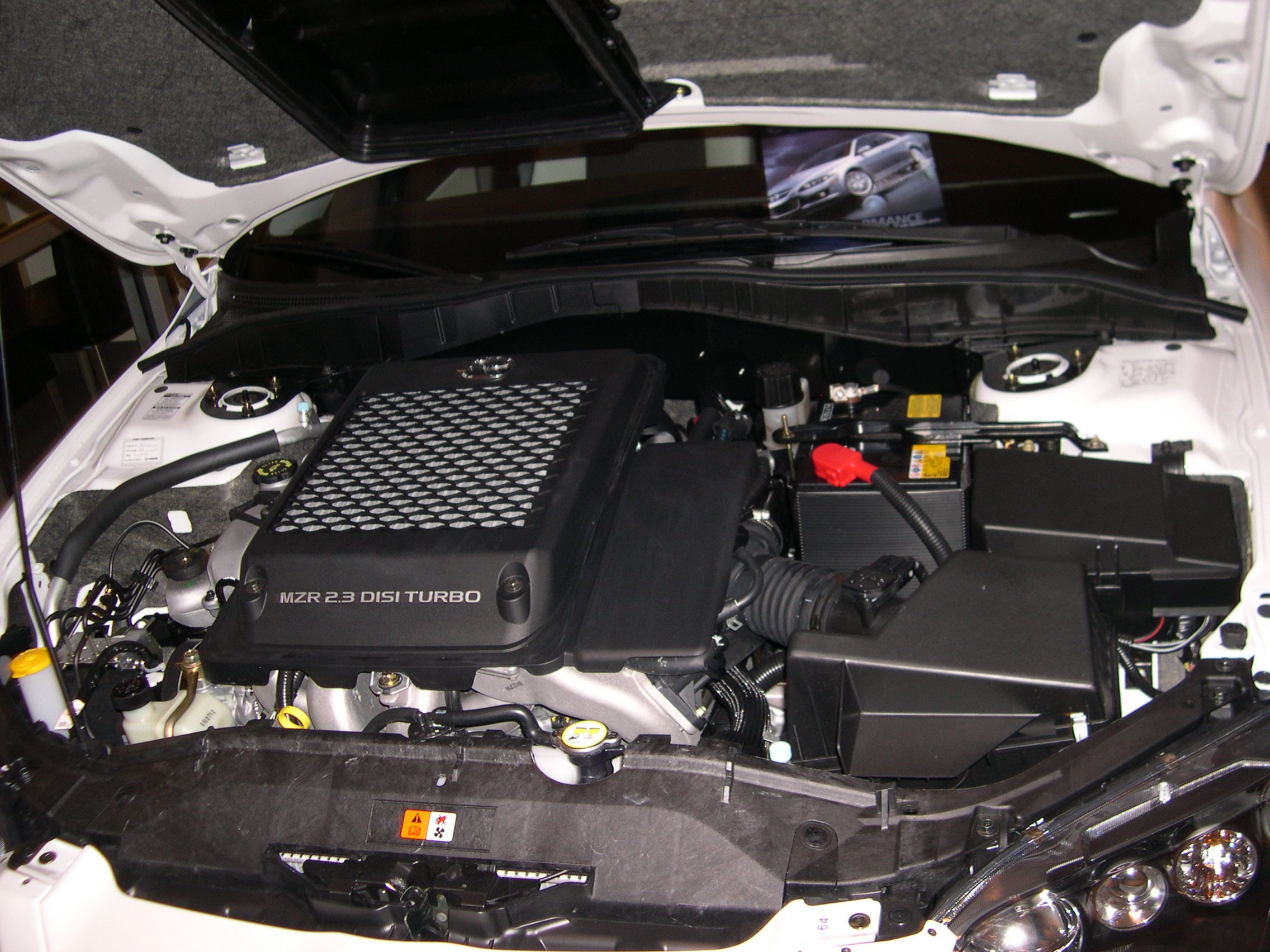
- Turbocharged MZR engine in a 2006 Mazdaspeed6

Overview
- Manufacturer: Mazda; Ford Motor Company
- Also called: MZR Z; MZR L; Mazda R; Duratec; EcoBoost
- Production: 2001–2015 (Mazda); 2003-present (Ford)

Layout
- Configuration: Inline-four
- Displacement: 2.0 L (1,998 cc; 121.9 cu in)
- Cylinder bore: 90 mm (3.5 in)
- Piston stroke: 78.5 mm (3.09 in)
- Cylinder block material: Aluminum
- Cylinder head material: Aluminum
- Valvetrain: DOHC

Combustion
- Fuel type: Gasoline; Diesel

Chronology
- Predecessor: Mazda B engine; Mazda F engine; Ford Zetec engine; Ford CVH engine
- Successor: SkyActiv

MZR is the brand name of a generation of Inline-four engines engineered and built by the Mazda Motor Corporation from 2001 to the present. MZR stands for "MaZda Responsive". The MZR generation includes gasoline and diesel powered engines ranging in displacements from 1.3 L to 2.5 L.

All gasoline-powered MZR engines feature an all-aluminum block construction with iron cylinder liners. The diesel MZR-CD engines use a cast-iron block (virtually identical to the Mazda F engine) and an aluminum cylinder head.

== Variants ==
There are three specific engine families within the MZR which include:

1. the small 1.3 L to 1.6 L Mazda Z engine
2. the mid-sized 1.8 L to 2.5 L Mazda L engine
3. the 2.0 L and 2.2 L common-rail diesel Mazda R-engine

The DISI turbocharged MZR L3-VDT was on the Ward's 10 Best Engines list for 3 consecutive years for 2006, 2007 and 2008.

== Licensed to Ford ==
The Ford Motor Company co-developed the engines with Mazda during the period where Ford owned a controlling share in Mazda. Ford retains perpetual rights to build and use the MZR generation of engines. Ford has sold the MZR engine under their Duratec brand name for global service in its vehicles since 2003.

== Discontinued ==
As of 2011, Mazda discontinued development of the MZR generation of engines and began to replace it with their SkyActiv generation of engines.

Applications:

- 2005-2015 Mazda Roadster/Miata/MX-5
- 2003-2013 Mazda3
- 2003-2013 Mazda6

== See also ==
- List of Mazda engines
