= 2012 American Le Mans Series VIR 240 =

Track map of VIR

The 2012 American Le Mans Series presented by Tequila Patrón VIR 240 was a multi-class sports car and GT motor race held at Virginia International Raceway in Alton, Virginia, United States on September 15, 2012. It was the ninth and penultimate round of the 2012 American Le Mans Series season. It was a new event for the American Le Mans Series but had been held the previous ten years for the Rolex Sports Car Series. The race was held over a four-hour time period, during which 135 laps of the 3.3 kilometre "Full Course" circuit were completed for a race distance of 710 kilometres.

The race was won by Muscle Milk Pickett Racing pair of Lucas Luhr and Klaus Graf in their HPD ARX-03a. The leaders of the P1 championship won by three laps over their season long rivals from the Dyson Racing Team, Chris Dyson and Guy Smith in their Lola B12/60. One lap further behind in third place was the P2 class winners, Level 5 Motorsports team of Scott Tucker and Christophe Bouchut in their HPD ARX-03b. They won the P2 class by 27 seconds over their season-long rivals the Conquest Endurance team of Martin Plowman and David Heinemeier Hansson in their Morgan LMP2.

Three of the five class championships of drivers were decided, the first of them was the Prototype Challenge. Jon Bennett and Colin Braun did all they could to keep the championship alive, winning PC in their CORE Autosport Oreca FLM09, but third place was enough for their Venezuelan teammate Alex Popow to wrap up his first ALMS class championship, despite being involved in a first lap collision.

In eighth place was the GT class and championship winners the Corvette Racing pair of Oliver Gavin and Tommy Milner in their Chevrolet Corvette C6.R. In wrapping up the champion Gavin won his class for Corvette Racing for the fourth time with Milner claiming his first ALMS title. It also returned Corvette Racing to the winners list for the first time since 2008 after dominating much of the decade.

Similarly Cooper MacNeil won the GT Challenge class from the front, wrapping his championship up for Alex Job Racing with a 0.4 second win with his co-driver Leh Keen over the NGT Motorsport pair of Henrique Cisneros and Jeroen Bleekemolen.

28 of the 31 entries were running at races conclusion, although the second of the Level 5 Motorsports HPD ARX-03b's was subsequently excluded for failing an air-restrictor stall test after the race.

== Race ==
=== Race result ===
Class winners in bold. Cars failing to complete 70% of their class winner's distance are marked as Not Classified (NC).

| Pos | Class | No | Team | Drivers | Chassis | Tire | Laps |
| Pos | Class | No | Team | Drivers | Engine | Tire | Laps |
|---|---|---|---|---|---|---|---|
| 1 | **P1** | **6** | **(United States) Muscle Milk Pickett Racing** | **(Germany) Lucas Luhr (Germany) Klaus Graf** | **HPD ARX-03a** | MI | **135** |
| 1 | **P1** | **6** | **(United States) Muscle Milk Pickett Racing** | **(Germany) Lucas Luhr (Germany) Klaus Graf** | **Honda 3.4 L V8** | MI | **135** |
| 2 | P1 | 16 | (United States) Dyson Racing Team | (United States) Chris Dyson (United Kingdom) Guy Smith (United Kingdom) Johnny Mowlem | Lola B12/60 | D | 132 |
| 2 | P1 | 16 | (United States) Dyson Racing Team | (United States) Chris Dyson (United Kingdom) Guy Smith (United Kingdom) Johnny Mowlem | Mazda MZR-R 2.0 L Turbo I4 (Isobutanol) | D | 132 |
| 3 | **P2** | **055** | **(United States) Level 5 Motorsports** | **(United States) Scott Tucker (France) Christophe Bouchut** | **HPD ARX-03b** | D | **131** |
| 3 | **P2** | **055** | **(United States) Level 5 Motorsports** | **(United States) Scott Tucker (France) Christophe Bouchut** | **Honda HR28TT 2.8 L Turbo V6** | D | **131** |
| 4 | P2 | 37 | (United States) Conquest Endurance | (United Kingdom) Martin Plowman (Denmark) David Heinemeier Hansson | Morgan LMP2 | D | 131 |
| 4 | P2 | 37 | (United States) Conquest Endurance | (United Kingdom) Martin Plowman (Denmark) David Heinemeier Hansson | Nissan VK45DE 4.5 L V8 | D | 131 |
| 5 | **PC** | **05** | **(United States) CORE Autosport** | **(United States) Jon Bennett (United States) Colin Braun** | **Oreca FLM09** | MI | **128** |
| 5 | **PC** | **05** | **(United States) CORE Autosport** | **(United States) Jon Bennett (United States) Colin Braun** | **Chevrolet LS3 6.2 L V8** | MI | **128** |
| 6 | PC | 52 | (United States) PR1/Mathiasen Motorsports | (Mexico) Rudy Junco Jr. (United Kingdom) Marino Franchitti | Oreca FLM09 | MI | 127 |
| 6 | PC | 52 | (United States) PR1/Mathiasen Motorsports | (Mexico) Rudy Junco Jr. (United Kingdom) Marino Franchitti | Chevrolet LS3 6.2 L V8 | MI | 127 |
| 7 | PC | 06 | (United States) CORE Autosport | (Venezuela) Alex Popow (United Kingdom) Tom Kimber-Smith | Oreca FLM09 | MI | 127 |
| 7 | PC | 06 | (United States) CORE Autosport | (Venezuela) Alex Popow (United Kingdom) Tom Kimber-Smith | Chevrolet LS3 6.2 L V8 | MI | 127 |
| 8 | **GT** | **4** | **(United States) Corvette Racing** | **(United Kingdom) Oliver Gavin (United States) Tommy Milner** | **Chevrolet Corvette C6.R** | MI | **126** |
| 8 | **GT** | **4** | **(United States) Corvette Racing** | **(United Kingdom) Oliver Gavin (United States) Tommy Milner** | **Chevrolet 5.5 L V8** | MI | **126** |
| 9 | GT | 45 | (United States) Flying Lizard Motorsports | (Germany) Jörg Bergmeister (United States) Patrick Long | Porsche 997 GT3-RSR | MI | 126 |
| 9 | GT | 45 | (United States) Flying Lizard Motorsports | (Germany) Jörg Bergmeister (United States) Patrick Long | Porsche 4.0 L Flat-6 | MI | 126 |
| 10 | GT | 01 | (United States) Extreme Speed Motorsports | (United States) Scott Sharp (United States) Johannes van Overbeek | Ferrari 458 Italia GT2 | MI | 126 |
| 10 | GT | 01 | (United States) Extreme Speed Motorsports | (United States) Scott Sharp (United States) Johannes van Overbeek | Ferrari 4.5 L V8 | MI | 126 |
| 11 | GT | 55 | (United States) BMW Team RLL | (Germany) Jörg Müller (United States) Bill Auberlen | BMW M3 GT2 | D | 126 |
| 11 | GT | 55 | (United States) BMW Team RLL | (Germany) Jörg Müller (United States) Bill Auberlen | BMW 4.0 L V8 | D | 126 |
| 12 | PC | 9 | (United States) RSR Racing | (Brazil) Bruno Junqueira (United States) Tomy Drissi | Oreca FLM09 | MI | 125 |
| 12 | PC | 9 | (United States) RSR Racing | (Brazil) Bruno Junqueira (United States) Tomy Drissi | Chevrolet LS3 6.2 L V8 | MI | 125 |
| 13 | GT | 44 | (United States) Flying Lizard Motorsports | (United States) Seth Neiman (Germany) Marco Holzer | Porsche 997 GT3-RSR | MI | 125 |
| 13 | GT | 44 | (United States) Flying Lizard Motorsports | (United States) Seth Neiman (Germany) Marco Holzer | Porsche 4.0 L Flat-6 | MI | 125 |
| 14 | PC | 25 | (United States) Dempsey Racing | (France) Henri Richard (United States) Duncan Ende | Oreca FLM09 | MI | 124 |
| 14 | PC | 25 | (United States) Dempsey Racing | (France) Henri Richard (United States) Duncan Ende | Chevrolet LS3 6.2 L V8 | MI | 124 |
| 15 | GT | 23 | (United States) Lotus / Alex Job Racing | (United States) Bill Sweedler (United States) Townsend Bell | Lotus Evora GTE | Y | 124 |
| 15 | GT | 23 | (United States) Lotus / Alex Job Racing | (United States) Bill Sweedler (United States) Townsend Bell | Toyota-Cosworth 3.5 L V6 | Y | 124 |
| 16 | GT | 17 | (United States) Team Falken Tire | (Germany) Wolf Henzler (United States) Bryan Sellers | Porsche 997 GT3-RSR | FAL | 123 |
| 16 | GT | 17 | (United States) Team Falken Tire | (Germany) Wolf Henzler (United States) Bryan Sellers | Porsche 4.0 L Flat-6 | FAL | 123 |
| 17 | GT | 3 | (United States) Corvette Racing | (Denmark) Jan Magnussen (Spain) Antonio García | Chevrolet Corvette C6.R | MI | 122 |
| 17 | GT | 3 | (United States) Corvette Racing | (Denmark) Jan Magnussen (Spain) Antonio García | Chevrolet 5.5 L V8 | MI | 122 |
| 18 | PC | 7 | (United States) Merchant Services Racing | (Canada) Tony Burgess (Mexico) Pablo Sanchez (United States) Eric Lux | Oreca FLM09 | MI | 121 |
| 18 | PC | 7 | (United States) Merchant Services Racing | (Canada) Tony Burgess (Mexico) Pablo Sanchez (United States) Eric Lux | Chevrolet LS3 6.2 L V8 | MI | 121 |
| 19 | GT | 56 | (United States) BMW Team RLL | (Germany) Dirk Müller (United States) Jonathan Summerton | BMW M3 GT2 | D | 120 |
| 19 | GT | 56 | (United States) BMW Team RLL | (Germany) Dirk Müller (United States) Jonathan Summerton | BMW 4.0 L V8 | D | 120 |
| 20 | **GTC** | **22** | **(United States) Alex Job Racing** | **(United States) Cooper MacNeil (United States) Leh Keen** | **Porsche 997 GT3 Cup** | Y | **118** |
| 20 | **GTC** | **22** | **(United States) Alex Job Racing** | **(United States) Cooper MacNeil (United States) Leh Keen** | **Porsche 4.0 L Flat-6** | Y | **118** |
| 21 | GTC | 30 | (United States) NGT Motorsport | (United States) Henrique Cisneros (Netherlands) Jeroen Bleekemolen | Porsche 997 GT3 Cup | Y | 118 |
| 21 | GTC | 30 | (United States) NGT Motorsport | (United States) Henrique Cisneros (Netherlands) Jeroen Bleekemolen | Porsche 4.0 L Flat-6 | Y | 118 |
| 22 | GTC | 11 | (United States) JDX Racing | (Canada) Chris Cumming (Canada) Michael Valiante | Porsche 997 GT3 Cup | Y | 118 |
| 22 | GTC | 11 | (United States) JDX Racing | (Canada) Chris Cumming (Canada) Michael Valiante | Porsche 4.0 L Flat-6 | Y | 118 |
| 23 | GTC | 34 | (United States) Green Hornet Racing | (United States) Peter LeSaffre (Republic of Ireland) Damien Faulkner | Porsche 997 GT3 Cup | Y | 118 |
| 23 | GTC | 34 | (United States) Green Hornet Racing | (United States) Peter LeSaffre (Republic of Ireland) Damien Faulkner | Porsche 4.0 L Flat-6 | Y | 118 |
| 24 | GTC | 66 | (United States) TRG | (Venezuela) Emilio Di Guida (United States) Spencer Pumpelly | Porsche 997 GT3 Cup | Y | 116 |
| 24 | GTC | 66 | (United States) TRG | (Venezuela) Emilio Di Guida (United States) Spencer Pumpelly | Porsche 4.0 L Flat-6 | Y | 116 |
| 25 | GTC | 31 | (United States) NGT Motorsport | (Venezuela) Angel Benitez, Sr. (Venezuela) Angel Benitez, Jr. | Porsche 997 GT3 Cup | Y | 116 |
| 25 | GTC | 31 | (United States) NGT Motorsport | (Venezuela) Angel Benitez, Sr. (Venezuela) Angel Benitez, Jr. | Porsche 4.0 L Flat-6 | Y | 116 |
| 26 | GTC | 24 | (United States) Competition Motorsports | (United States) Bob Faieta (United States) Michael Avenatti | Porsche 997 GT3 Cup | Y | 114 |
| 26 | GTC | 24 | (United States) Competition Motorsports | (United States) Bob Faieta (United States) Michael Avenatti | Porsche 4.0 L Flat-6 | Y | 114 |
| 27 DNF | GT | 48 | (United States) Paul Miller Racing | (United States) Bryce Miller (Germany) Sascha Maassen | Porsche 997 GT3-RSR | D | 98 |
| 27 DNF | GT | 48 | (United States) Paul Miller Racing | (United States) Bryce Miller (Germany) Sascha Maassen | Porsche 4.0 L Flat-6 | D | 98 |
| 28 DNF | P1 | 20 | (United States) Dyson Racing Team | (United States) Michael Marsal (United States) Mark Patterson (United States) Chris Dyson | Lola B11/66 | D | 94 |
| 28 DNF | P1 | 20 | (United States) Dyson Racing Team | (United States) Michael Marsal (United States) Mark Patterson (United States) Chris Dyson | Mazda MZR-R 2.0 L Turbo I4 (Isobutanol) | D | 94 |
| 29 DNF | GT | 02 | (United States) Extreme Speed Motorsports | (United States) Ed Brown (United States) Guy Cosmo | Ferrari 458 Italia GT2 | MI | 93 |
| 29 DNF | GT | 02 | (United States) Extreme Speed Motorsports | (United States) Ed Brown (United States) Guy Cosmo | Ferrari 4.5 L V8 | MI | 93 |
| 30 DNF | PC | 8 | (United States) Merchant Services Racing | (Canada) Kyle Marcelli (United States) Lucas Downs | Oreca FLM09 | MI | 32 |
| 30 DNF | PC | 8 | (United States) Merchant Services Racing | (Canada) Kyle Marcelli (United States) Lucas Downs | Chevrolet LS3 6.2 L V8 | MI | 32 |
| EX | P2 | 95 | (United States) Level 5 Motorsports | (United States) Scott Tucker (Mexico) Luis Díaz (Mexico) Ricardo González | HPD ARX-03b | D | 131 |
| EX | P2 | 95 | (United States) Level 5 Motorsports | (United States) Scott Tucker (Mexico) Luis Díaz (Mexico) Ricardo González | Honda HR28TT 2.8 L Turbo V6 | D | 131 |

American Le Mans Series
| Previous race: Baltimore Sports Car Challenge | 2012 season | Next race: Petit Le Mans |
