= 2012 Grand Prix of Mosport =

Canadian Tire Motorsport Park

The 2012 Mobil 1 presents the Grand Prix of Mosport was a multi-class sports car and GT motor race held at Canadian Tire Motorsport Park in Ontario, Canada on July 22, 2012. It was the fifth round of the 2012 American Le Mans Series season and the 30th Grand Prix of Mosport. The race was held a two-hour and 45 minute time period, during which 117 laps of the 3.9 kilometre circuit were completed for a race distance of 463 kilometres.

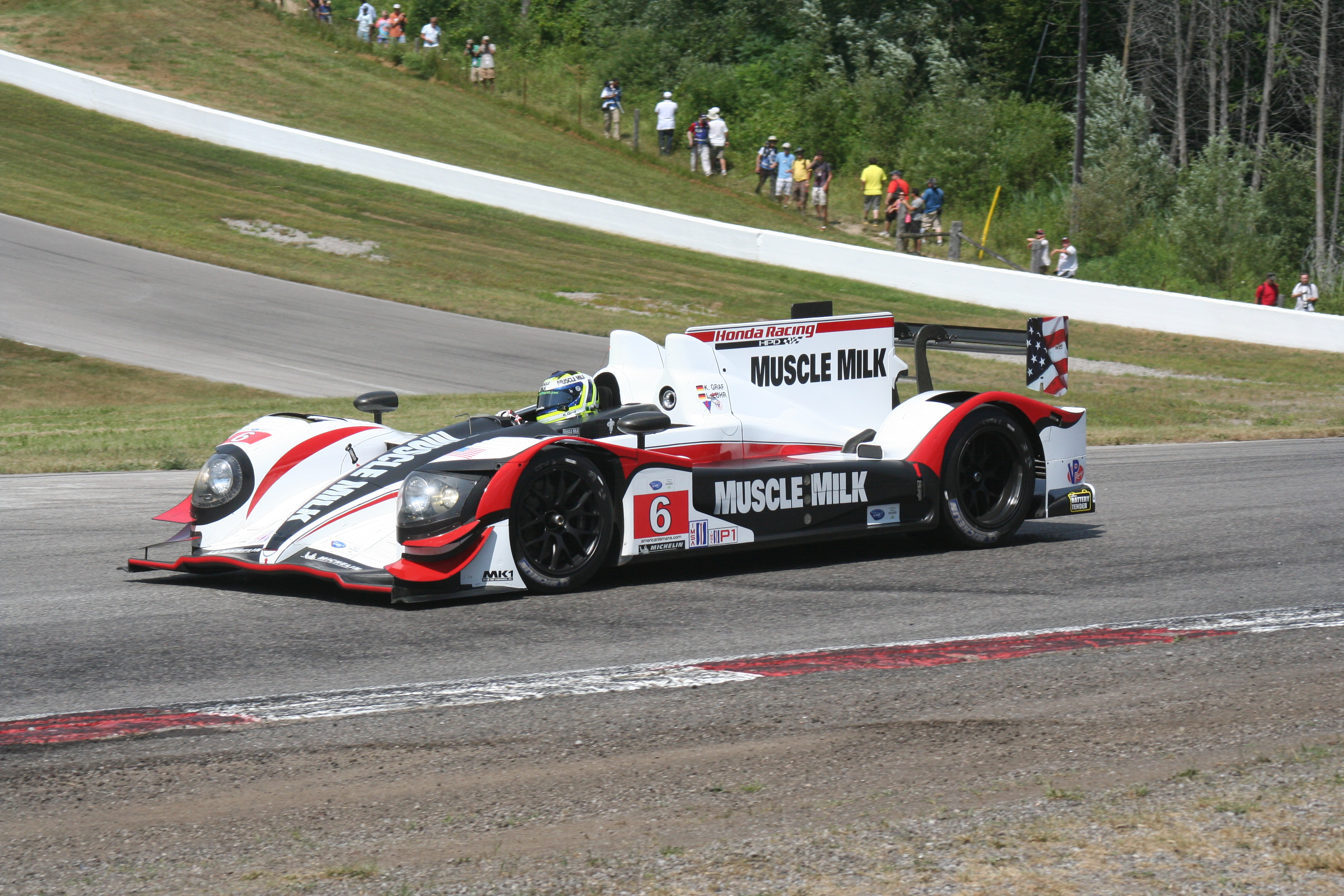
Muscle Milk Pickett Racing HPD ARX-03a - Winner 2012 Mobil 1 Grand Prix of Mosport

The race was won by the Muscle Milk Pickett Racing team. German drivers Lucas Luhr and Klaus Graf driving a HPD ARX-03a Honda sports car took an eleven-second victory over the Dyson Racing Team run Lola B12/60 sports car. It was the fourth consecutive victory for Luhr and Graf and also for both drivers it was their third victories in the Grand Prix of Mosport.

Third place, and first in the P2 division was Conquest Endurance team of Martin Plowman and David Heinemeier Hansson in their Morgan LMP2. It was their first victory in the class and the first time Level 5 Motorsports had not won in the 2012 season. Any chance Level 5's HPD ARX-03b had of victory ended when Christophe Bouchut acquired a stop-go penalty late in the race crossing the blend-line at the exit of pit lane.

Fifth was the second Dyson Racing Team Lola-Mazda ahead of the PC class winners, the RSR Racing pair of Bruno Junqueira and Tomy Drissi in their Oreca FLM09. It was the team's first victory in the Prototype Challenge class.

Tenth outright was the GT class winners, Extreme Speed Motorsports pair of Scott Sharp and Johannes van Overbeek in their Ferrari 458 Italia. It was the first win of the year for Ferrari and the fourth different manufacturer to win in GT in five races. It was also Extreme Speed's debut ALMS win. The Ferrari crossed the finish line in second position, just behind the Flying Lizard Motorsports Porsche of Jörg Bergmeister and Patrick Long but the Porsche failed post-race scrutineering. Van Overbeek only moved into the race winning position on the last lap after Jan Magnussen's Chevrolet Corvette slide wide while attacking Bergmeister for the lead of the class.

Back in 19th were the GT Challenge class winners, TRG driver Emilio Di Guida and Spencer Pumpelly.

22 of the 26 entries were running at races conclusion.

== Race ==
=== Race result ===
Class winners in bold. Cars failing to complete 70% of their class winner's distance are marked as Not Classified (NC).

| Pos | Class | No | Team | Drivers | Chassis | Tire | Laps |
| Pos | Class | No | Team | Drivers | Engine | Tire | Laps |
|---|---|---|---|---|---|---|---|
| 1 | **P1** | **6** | **(United States) Muscle Milk Pickett Racing** | **(Germany) Lucas Luhr (Germany) Klaus Graf** | **HPD ARX-03a** | MI | **117** |
| 1 | **P1** | **6** | **(United States) Muscle Milk Pickett Racing** | **(Germany) Lucas Luhr (Germany) Klaus Graf** | **Honda 3.4 L V8** | MI | **117** |
| 2 | P1 | 16 | (United States) Dyson Racing Team | (United States) Chris Dyson (United Kingdom) Guy Smith | Lola B12/60 | D | 117 |
| 2 | P1 | 16 | (United States) Dyson Racing Team | (United States) Chris Dyson (United Kingdom) Guy Smith | Mazda MZR-R 2.0 L Turbo I4 (Isobutanol) | D | 117 |
| 3 | **P2** | **37** | **(United States) Conquest Endurance** | **(United Kingdom) Martin Plowman (Denmark) David Heinemeier Hansson** | **Morgan LMP2** | D | **117** |
| 3 | **P2** | **37** | **(United States) Conquest Endurance** | **(United Kingdom) Martin Plowman (Denmark) David Heinemeier Hansson** | **Nissan VK45DE 4.5 L V8** | D | **117** |
| 4 | P2 | 055 | (United States) Level 5 Motorsports | (United States) Scott Tucker (France) Christophe Bouchut | HPD ARX-03b | D | 117 |
| 4 | P2 | 055 | (United States) Level 5 Motorsports | (United States) Scott Tucker (France) Christophe Bouchut | Honda HR28TT 2.8 L Turbo V6 | D | 117 |
| 5 | P1 | 20 | (United States) Dyson Racing Team | (Canada) Tony Burgess (United States) Eric Lux | Lola B11/66 | D | 115 |
| 5 | P1 | 20 | (United States) Dyson Racing Team | (Canada) Tony Burgess (United States) Eric Lux | Mazda MZR-R 2.0 L Turbo I4 (Isobutanol) | D | 115 |
| 6 | **PC** | **9** | **(United States) RSR Racing** | **(Brazil) Bruno Junqueira (United States) Tomy Drissi** | **Oreca FLM09** | MI | **115** |
| 6 | **PC** | **9** | **(United States) RSR Racing** | **(Brazil) Bruno Junqueira (United States) Tomy Drissi** | **Chevrolet LS3 6.2 L V8** | MI | **115** |
| 7 | PC | 05 | (United States) CORE Autosport | (United States) Jon Bennett (United States) Colin Braun | Oreca FLM09 | MI | 114 |
| 7 | PC | 05 | (United States) CORE Autosport | (United States) Jon Bennett (United States) Colin Braun | Chevrolet LS3 6.2 L V8 | MI | 114 |
| 8 | PC | 06 | (United States) CORE Autosport | (Venezuela) Alex Popow (United Kingdom) Ryan Dalziel | Oreca FLM09 | MI | 113 |
| 8 | PC | 06 | (United States) CORE Autosport | (Venezuela) Alex Popow (United Kingdom) Ryan Dalziel | Chevrolet LS3 6.2 L V8 | MI | 113 |
| 9 | PC | 25 | (United States) Dempsey Racing | (France) Henri Richard (United States) Duncan Ende | Oreca FLM09 | MI | 112 |
| 9 | PC | 25 | (United States) Dempsey Racing | (France) Henri Richard (United States) Duncan Ende | Chevrolet LS3 6.2 L V8 | MI | 112 |
| 10 | **GT** | **01** | **(United States) Extreme Speed Motorsports** | **(United States) Scott Sharp (United States) Johannes van Overbeek** | **Ferrari 458 Italia GT2** | MI | **112** |
| 10 | **GT** | **01** | **(United States) Extreme Speed Motorsports** | **(United States) Scott Sharp (United States) Johannes van Overbeek** | **Ferrari 4.5 L V8** | MI | **112** |
| 11 | GT | 3 | (United States) Corvette Racing | (Denmark) Jan Magnussen (Spain) Antonio García | Chevrolet Corvette C6.R | MI | 112 |
| 11 | GT | 3 | (United States) Corvette Racing | (Denmark) Jan Magnussen (Spain) Antonio García | Chevrolet 5.5 L V8 | MI | 112 |
| 12 | GT | 56 | (United States) BMW Team RLL | (United States) Joey Hand (Germany) Dirk Müller | BMW M3 GT2 | D | 111 |
| 12 | GT | 56 | (United States) BMW Team RLL | (United States) Joey Hand (Germany) Dirk Müller | BMW 4.0 L V8 | D | 111 |
| 13 | GT | 17 | (United States) Team Falken Tire | (Germany) Wolf Henzler (United States) Bryan Sellers | Porsche 997 GT3-RSR | FAL | 111 |
| 13 | GT | 17 | (United States) Team Falken Tire | (Germany) Wolf Henzler (United States) Bryan Sellers | Porsche 4.0 L Flat-6 | FAL | 111 |
| 14 | GT | 48 | (United States) Paul Miller Racing | (United States) Bryce Miller (Germany) Sascha Maassen | Porsche 997 GT3-RSR | D | 110 |
| 14 | GT | 48 | (United States) Paul Miller Racing | (United States) Bryce Miller (Germany) Sascha Maassen | Porsche 4.0 L Flat-6 | D | 110 |
| 15 | GT | 44 | (United States) Flying Lizard Motorsports | (United States) Seth Neiman (United States) Andy Lally | Porsche 997 GT3-RSR | MI | 110 |
| 15 | GT | 44 | (United States) Flying Lizard Motorsports | (United States) Seth Neiman (United States) Andy Lally | Porsche 4.0 L Flat-6 | MI | 110 |
| 16 | GT | 55 | (United States) BMW Team RLL | (Germany) Jörg Müller (United States) Bill Auberlen | BMW M3 GT2 | D | 110 |
| 16 | GT | 55 | (United States) BMW Team RLL | (Germany) Jörg Müller (United States) Bill Auberlen | BMW 4.0 L V8 | D | 110 |
| 17 | GT | 23 | (United States) Lotus / Alex Job Racing | (United States) Bill Sweedler (United States) Townsend Bell | Lotus Evora GTE | Y | 110 |
| 17 | GT | 23 | (United States) Lotus / Alex Job Racing | (United States) Bill Sweedler (United States) Townsend Bell | Toyota-Cosworth 3.5 L V6 | Y | 110 |
| 18 | GT | 02 | (United States) Extreme Speed Motorsports | (United States) Ed Brown (United States) Guy Cosmo | Ferrari 458 Italia GT2 | MI | 109 |
| 18 | GT | 02 | (United States) Extreme Speed Motorsports | (United States) Ed Brown (United States) Guy Cosmo | Ferrari 4.5 L V8 | MI | 109 |
| 19 | **GTC** | **66** | **(United States) TRG** | **(Venezuela) Emilio Di Guida (United States) Spencer Pumpelly** | **Porsche 997 GT3 Cup** | Y | **104** |
| 19 | **GTC** | **66** | **(United States) TRG** | **(Venezuela) Emilio Di Guida (United States) Spencer Pumpelly** | **Porsche 4.0 L Flat-6** | Y | **104** |
| 20 | GTC | 22 | (United States) Alex Job Racing | (United States) Cooper MacNeil (United States) Leh Keen | Porsche 997 GT3 Cup | Y | 104 |
| 20 | GTC | 22 | (United States) Alex Job Racing | (United States) Cooper MacNeil (United States) Leh Keen | Porsche 4.0 L Flat-6 | Y | 104 |
| 21 DNF | GTC | 11 | (United States) JDX Racing | (Canada) Chris Cumming (Canada) Michael Valiante | Porsche 997 GT3 Cup | Y | 98 |
| 21 DNF | GTC | 11 | (United States) JDX Racing | (Canada) Chris Cumming (Canada) Michael Valiante | Porsche 4.0 L Flat-6 | Y | 98 |
| 22 DNF | PC | 8 | (United States) Merchant Services Racing | (Canada) Kyle Marcelli (United States) Antonio Downs | Oreca FLM09 | MI | 97 |
| 22 DNF | PC | 8 | (United States) Merchant Services Racing | (Canada) Kyle Marcelli (United States) Antonio Downs | Chevrolet LS3 6.2 L V8 | MI | 97 |
| 23 | GT | 4 | (United States) Corvette Racing | (United Kingdom) Oliver Gavin (United States) Tommy Milner | Chevrolet Corvette C6.R | MI | 91 |
| 23 | GT | 4 | (United States) Corvette Racing | (United Kingdom) Oliver Gavin (United States) Tommy Milner | Chevrolet 5.5 L V8 | MI | 91 |
| 24 DNF | PC | 52 | (United States) PR1/Mathiasen Motorsports | (United Kingdom) Marino Franchitti (United States) Ken Dobson | Oreca FLM09 | MI | 26 |
| 24 DNF | PC | 52 | (United States) PR1/Mathiasen Motorsports | (United Kingdom) Marino Franchitti (United States) Ken Dobson | Chevrolet LS3 6.2 L V8 | MI | 26 |
| 25 DNF | GTC | 34 | (United States) Green Hornet Racing | (United States) Peter LeSaffre (Republic of Ireland) Damien Faulkner | Porsche 997 GT3 Cup | Y | 23 |
| 25 DNF | GTC | 34 | (United States) Green Hornet Racing | (United States) Peter LeSaffre (Republic of Ireland) Damien Faulkner | Porsche 4.0 L Flat-6 | Y | 23 |
| 26 EXC | GT | 45 | (United States) Flying Lizard Motorsports | (Germany) Jörg Bergmeister (United States) Patrick Long | Porsche 997 GT3-RSR | MI | 112 |
| 26 EXC | GT | 45 | (United States) Flying Lizard Motorsports | (Germany) Jörg Bergmeister (United States) Patrick Long | Porsche 4.0 L Flat-6 | MI | 112 |
OFFICIAL RACE RESULTS

American Le Mans Series
| Previous race: Northeast Grand Prix | 2012 season | Next race: Mid-Ohio Sports Car Challenge |
