= 2012 Northeast Grand Prix =

2012 sports car race in the United States

Track map of Lime Rock Park

The 2012 American Le Mans Northeast Grand Prix was a multi-class sports car motor race held at Lime Rock Park on July 7, 2012. It was the fourth round of the 2012 American Le Mans Series season.

== Qualifying ==
=== Qualifying results ===
Pole position winners in each class are marked in bold.

Pos	Class	Team	Driver	Lap Time	Grid
1	**P1**	**#16 Dyson Racing Team**	**Guy Smith**	**0:44.017**	**1**
2	P1	#6 Muscle Milk Pickett Racing	Lucas Luhr	0:44.119	2
3	P2	#055 Level 5 Motorsports	Christophe Bouchut	0:46.539	29
4	P1	#20 Dyson Racing Team	Eric Lux	0:46.552	3
5	P2	#95 Level 5 Motorsports	Scott Tucker	0:47.007	DNS
6	**P2**	**#37 Conquest Endurance**	**Martin Plowman**	**0:47.072**	**4**
7	**PC**	**#8 Merchant Services Racing**	**Kyle Marcelli**	**0:47.249**	**5**
8	PC	#9 RSR Racing	Bruno Junqueira	0:47.482	6
9	P2	#27 Dempsey Racing	Joe Foster	0:47.992	7
10	PC	#52 PR1/Mathiasen Motorsports	Butch Leitzinger	0:48.033	8
11	PC	#06 CORE Autosport	Tom Kimber-Smith	0:48.134	9
12	PC	#05 CORE Autosport	Colin Braun	0:48.137	10
13	PC	#25 Dempsey Racing	Duncan Ende	0:48.726	11
14	**GT**	**#55 BMW Team RLL**	**Bill Auberlen**	**0:50.920**	**12**
15	GT	#44 Flying Lizard Motorsports	Marco Holzer	0:51.299	25
16	GT	#4 Corvette Racing	Oliver Gavin	0:51.299	13
17	GT	#56 BMW Team RLL	Joey Hand	0:51.334	14
18	GT	#45 Flying Lizard Motorsports	Patrick Long	0:51.483	15
19	GT	#3 Corvette Racing	Jan Magnussen	0:51.505	16
20	GT	#01 Extreme Speed Motorsports	Scott Sharp	0:51.525	17
21	GT	#17 Team Falken Tire	Bryan Sellers	0:51.957	18
22	GT	#48 Paul Miller Racing	Bryce Miller	0:52.259	19
23	GT	#23 Lotus / Alex Job Racing	Townsend Bell	0:52.458	20
24	GT	#02 Extreme Speed Motorsports	Ed Brown	0:54.507	28
25	**GTC**	**#22 Alex Job Racing**	**Leh Keen**	**0:55.195**	**21**
26	GTC	#66 TRG	Spencer Pumpelly	0:55.396	22
27	GTC	#34 Green Hornet Racing	Damien Faulkner	0:55.418	26
28	GTC	#32 GMG Racing	James Sofronas	0:55.825	23
29	GTC	#33 Green Hornet Racing	Peter LeSaffre	0:56.379	24
30	GTC	#11 JDX Racing	Chris Cumming	0:56.790	27

== Race ==
=== Race result ===
Class winners in bold. Cars failing to complete 70% of their class winner's distance are marked as Not Classified (NC).

Pos	Class	No	Team	Drivers	Chassis	Tire	Laps
Pos	Class	No	Team	Drivers	Engine	Tire	Laps
1	**P1**	**6**	**(United States) Muscle Milk Pickett Racing**	**(Germany) Lucas Luhr (Germany) Klaus Graf**	**HPD ARX-03a**	M	**168**
1	**P1**	**6**	**(United States) Muscle Milk Pickett Racing**	**(Germany) Lucas Luhr (Germany) Klaus Graf**	**Honda 3.4 L V8**	M	**168**
2	P1	16	(United States) Dyson Racing Team	(United States) Chris Dyson (United Kingdom) Guy Smith	Lola B12/60	D	168
2	P1	16	(United States) Dyson Racing Team	(United States) Chris Dyson (United Kingdom) Guy Smith	Mazda MZR-R 2.0 L Turbo I4 (Isobutanol)	D	168
3	**P2**	**055**	**(United States) Level 5 Motorsports**	**(United States) Scott Tucker (France) Christophe Bouchut**	**HPD ARX-03b**	D	**168**
3	**P2**	**055**	**(United States) Level 5 Motorsports**	**(United States) Scott Tucker (France) Christophe Bouchut**	**Honda HR28TT 2.8 L Turbo V6**	D	**168**
4	P2	37	(United States) Conquest Endurance	(United Kingdom) Martin Plowman (Denmark) David Heinemeier Hansson	Morgan LMP2	D	168
4	P2	37	(United States) Conquest Endurance	(United Kingdom) Martin Plowman (Denmark) David Heinemeier Hansson	Nissan VK45DE 4.5 L V8	D	168
5	**PC**	**05**	**(United States) CORE Autosport**	**(United States) Jon Bennett (United States) Colin Braun**	**Oreca FLM09**	M	**164**
5	**PC**	**05**	**(United States) CORE Autosport**	**(United States) Jon Bennett (United States) Colin Braun**	**Chevrolet LS3 6.2 L V8**	M	**164**
6	PC	06	(United States) CORE Autosport	(Venezuela) Alex Popow (United Kingdom) Tom Kimber-Smith	Oreca FLM09	M	164
6	PC	06	(United States) CORE Autosport	(Venezuela) Alex Popow (United Kingdom) Tom Kimber-Smith	Chevrolet LS3 6.2 L V8	M	164
7	P2	27	(United States) Dempsey Racing	(United States) Patrick Dempsey (United States) Joe Foster	Lola B12/87	M	162
7	P2	27	(United States) Dempsey Racing	(United States) Patrick Dempsey (United States) Joe Foster	Judd-BMW HK 3.6 L V8	M	162
8	PC	25	(United States) Dempsey Racing	(France) Henri Richard (United States) Duncan Ende	Oreca FLM09	M	162
8	PC	25	(United States) Dempsey Racing	(France) Henri Richard (United States) Duncan Ende	Chevrolet LS3 6.2 L V8	M	162
9	**GT**	**45**	**(United States) Flying Lizard Motorsports**	**(Germany) Jörg Bergmeister (United States) Patrick Long**	**Porsche 997 GT3-RSR**	M	**160**
9	**GT**	**45**	**(United States) Flying Lizard Motorsports**	**(Germany) Jörg Bergmeister (United States) Patrick Long**	**Porsche 4.0 L Flat-6**	M	**160**
10	GT	3	(United States) Corvette Racing	(Denmark) Jan Magnussen (Spain) Antonio García	Chevrolet Corvette C6.R	M	160
10	GT	3	(United States) Corvette Racing	(Denmark) Jan Magnussen (Spain) Antonio García	Chevrolet 5.5 L V8	M	160
11	GT	4	(United States) Corvette Racing	(United Kingdom) Oliver Gavin (United States) Tommy Milner	Chevrolet Corvette C6.R	M	160
11	GT	4	(United States) Corvette Racing	(United Kingdom) Oliver Gavin (United States) Tommy Milner	Chevrolet 5.5 L V8	M	160
12	GT	01	(United States) Extreme Speed Motorsports	(United States) Scott Sharp (United States) Johannes van Overbeek	Ferrari 458 Italia GT2	M	160
12	GT	01	(United States) Extreme Speed Motorsports	(United States) Scott Sharp (United States) Johannes van Overbeek	Ferrari 4.5 L V8	M	160
13	GT	56	(United States) BMW Team RLL	(United States) Joey Hand (Germany) Dirk Müller	BMW M3 GT2	D	159
13	GT	56	(United States) BMW Team RLL	(United States) Joey Hand (Germany) Dirk Müller	BMW 4.0 L V8	D	159
14	GT	55	(United States) BMW Team RLL	(Germany) Jörg Müller (United States) Bill Auberlen	BMW M3 GT2	D	159
14	GT	55	(United States) BMW Team RLL	(Germany) Jörg Müller (United States) Bill Auberlen	BMW 4.0 L V8	D	159
15	GT	17	(United States) Team Falken Tire	(Germany) Wolf Henzler (United States) Bryan Sellers	Porsche 997 GT3-RSR	F	158
15	GT	17	(United States) Team Falken Tire	(Germany) Wolf Henzler (United States) Bryan Sellers	Porsche 4.0 L Flat-6	F	158
16	GT	48	(United States) Paul Miller Racing	(United States) Bryce Miller (Germany) Sascha Maassen	Porsche 997 GT3-RSR	D	157
16	GT	48	(United States) Paul Miller Racing	(United States) Bryce Miller (Germany) Sascha Maassen	Porsche 4.0 L Flat-6	D	157
17	GT	44	(United States) Flying Lizard Motorsports	(United States) Seth Neiman (Germany) Marco Holzer	Porsche 997 GT3-RSR	M	157
17	GT	44	(United States) Flying Lizard Motorsports	(United States) Seth Neiman (Germany) Marco Holzer	Porsche 4.0 L Flat-6	M	157
18	GT	23	(United States) Lotus / Alex Job Racing	(United States) Bill Sweedler (United States) Townsend Bell	Lotus Evora GTE	Y	156
18	GT	23	(United States) Lotus / Alex Job Racing	(United States) Bill Sweedler (United States) Townsend Bell	Toyota-Cosworth 3.5 L V6	Y	156
19	PC	52	(United States) PR1/Mathiasen Motorsports	(United States) Butch Leitzinger (United States) Ken Dobson	Oreca FLM09	M	156
19	PC	52	(United States) PR1/Mathiasen Motorsports	(United States) Butch Leitzinger (United States) Ken Dobson	Chevrolet LS3 6.2 L V8	M	156
20	P1	20	(United States) Dyson Racing Team	(United States) Michael Marsal (United States) Eric Lux	Lola B11/66	D	153
20	P1	20	(United States) Dyson Racing Team	(United States) Michael Marsal (United States) Eric Lux	Mazda MZR-R 2.0 L Turbo I4 (Isobutanol)	D	153
21	**GTC**	**22**	**(United States) Alex Job Racing**	**(United States) Cooper MacNeil (United States) Leh Keen**	**Porsche 997 GT3 Cup**	Y	**151**
21	**GTC**	**22**	**(United States) Alex Job Racing**	**(United States) Cooper MacNeil (United States) Leh Keen**	**Porsche 4.0 L Flat-6**	Y	**151**
22	GTC	34	(United States) Green Hornet Racing	(United States) Peter LeSaffre (Republic of Ireland) Damien Faulkner	Porsche 997 GT3 Cup	Y	151
22	GTC	34	(United States) Green Hornet Racing	(United States) Peter LeSaffre (Republic of Ireland) Damien Faulkner	Porsche 4.0 L Flat-6	Y	151
23	GTC	32	(United States) GMG Racing	(United States) James Sofronas (United States) Alex Welch	Porsche 997 GT3 Cup	Y	150
23	GTC	32	(United States) GMG Racing	(United States) James Sofronas (United States) Alex Welch	Porsche 4.0 L Flat-6	Y	150
24	GTC	11	(United States) JDX Racing	(Canada) Chris Cumming (Canada) Michael Valiante	Porsche 997 GT3 Cup	Y	150
24	GTC	11	(United States) JDX Racing	(Canada) Chris Cumming (Canada) Michael Valiante	Porsche 4.0 L Flat-6	Y	150
25	GTC	33	(United States) Green Hornet Racing	(United States) Peter LeSaffre (United States) Anthony Lazzaro	Porsche 997 GT3 Cup	Y	148
25	GTC	33	(United States) Green Hornet Racing	(United States) Peter LeSaffre (United States) Anthony Lazzaro	Porsche 4.0 L Flat-6	Y	148
26	PC	9	(United States) RSR Racing	(Brazil) Bruno Junqueira (United States) Tomy Drissi	Oreca FLM09	M	146
26	PC	9	(United States) RSR Racing	(Brazil) Bruno Junqueira (United States) Tomy Drissi	Chevrolet LS3 6.2 L V8	M	146
27	GTC	66	(United States) TRG	(United States) Mike Piera (United States) Spencer Pumpelly	Porsche 997 GT3 Cup	Y	145
27	GTC	66	(United States) TRG	(United States) Mike Piera (United States) Spencer Pumpelly	Porsche 4.0 L Flat-6	Y	145
28 DNF	GT	02	(United States) Extreme Speed Motorsports	(United States) Ed Brown (United States) Guy Cosmo	Ferrari 458 Italia GT2	M	153
28 DNF	GT	02	(United States) Extreme Speed Motorsports	(United States) Ed Brown (United States) Guy Cosmo	Ferrari 4.5 L V8	M	153
29 DNF	PC	8	(United States) Merchant Services Racing	(Canada) Kyle Marcelli (United States) Antonio Downs	Oreca FLM09	M	21
29 DNF	PC	8	(United States) Merchant Services Racing	(Canada) Kyle Marcelli (United States) Antonio Downs	Chevrolet LS3 6.2 L V8	M	21
DNS	P2	95	(United States) Level 5 Motorsports	(United States) Scott Tucker (Mexico) Luis Díaz	HPD ARX-03b	D	-
DNS	P2	95	(United States) Level 5 Motorsports	(United States) Scott Tucker (Mexico) Luis Díaz	Honda HR28TT 2.8 L Turbo V6	D	-

American Le Mans Series
Previous race: American Le Mans Monterey	2012 season	Next race: Grand Prix of Mosport
