= 2012 American Le Mans Series =

42nd season of the racing series organized by IMSA

Seasons
- ← 2011 2013 →

The 2012 American Le Mans Series season was a multi-event auto racing championship for sports racing cars which conform to the technical regulations laid out by the International Motor Sports Association for the American Le Mans Series. It was the fourteenth season of the American Le Mans Series, and the 42nd season overall of the IMSA GT Championship. The season began with the 60th annual 12 Hours of Sebring on March 14–17, and covered ten events.

== Calendar ==
The 3.3 mile VIR Full Course configuration.

On September 30, 2011, ALMS president Scott Atherton announced an eleven race schedule for 2012. All nine of the events on the 2011 race schedule are carried over, while two new events are planned but not yet announced. Atherton stated three different venues are vying for the two calendar spots. One of the two new events was later removed from the calendar. The calendar will also share the 12 Hours of Sebring with the successor to the Intercontinental Le Mans Cup, the FIA World Endurance Championship, while the Petit Le Mans will count as the final round of the European Le Mans Series. It was also announced that four events would be televised live, while the rest would be streamed live on ESPN3 and televised on a tape delay the following day. All tape-delayed events were broadcast on ESPN, and began approximately one hour into the race.

On January 16, the ninth round was announced to take place at Virginia International Raceway on the Full Course layout. It will be both the first visit by ALMS to Virginia, as well as the first competition held on this layout.

| Rnd | Race | Length | Circuit | Location | Date |
|---|---|---|---|---|---|
| 1 | 60th Anniversary Mobil 1 12 Hours of Sebring | 12 Hours | Sebring International Raceway | Sebring, Florida | March 17 |
| 2 | Tequila Patrón American Le Mans Series at Long Beach | 2 Hours | Long Beach Street Circuit | Long Beach, California | April 14 |
| 3 | American Le Mans Monterey | 6 Hours | Mazda Raceway Laguna Seca | Monterey, California | May 12 |
| 4 | American Le Mans Northeast Grand Prix | 2 Hours 45 Minutes | Lime Rock Park | Lakeville, Connecticut | July 7 |
| 5 | Grand Prix of Mosport | 2 Hours 45 Minutes | Canadian Tire Motorsport Park | Bowmanville, Ontario | July 22 |
| 6 | Mid-Ohio Sports Car Challenge | 2 Hours 45 Minutes | Mid-Ohio Sports Car Course | Lexington, Ohio | August 4 |
| 7 | Road Race Showcase | 4 Hours | Road America | Elkhart Lake, Wisconsin | August 18 |
| 8 | Baltimore Sports Car Challenge | 2 Hours | Baltimore Street Circuit | Baltimore, Maryland | September 1 |
| 9 | American Le Mans Series VIR 240 | 4 Hours | Virginia International Raceway | Alton, Virginia | September 15 |
| 10 | 15th Annual Petit Le Mans | 1,000 mi (1,600 km) or 10 Hours | Road Atlanta | Braselton, Georgia | October 20 |

== Entry list ==
Entry List
| Entrant/Team | Car | Engine | Tyre | No | Drivers | Rounds |
P1
| (United States) Muscle Milk Pickett Racing | HPD ARX-03a | Honda LM-V8 3.4 L V8 | M | 6 | (Germany) Klaus Graf | All |
| (United States) Muscle Milk Pickett Racing | HPD ARX-03a | Honda LM-V8 3.4 L V8 | M | 6 | (Germany) Lucas Luhr | All |
| (United States) Muscle Milk Pickett Racing | HPD ARX-03a | Honda LM-V8 3.4 L V8 | M | 6 | (France) Simon Pagenaud | 1 |
| (United States) Muscle Milk Pickett Racing | HPD ARX-03a | Honda LM-V8 3.4 L V8 | M | 6 | (France) Romain Dumas | 10 |
| (Switzerland) Rebellion Racing | Lola B12/60 | Toyota RV8KLM 3.4 L V8 | M | 12 | (Italy) Andrea Belicchi | 10 |
| (Switzerland) Rebellion Racing | Lola B12/60 | Toyota RV8KLM 3.4 L V8 | M | 12 | (Switzerland) Neel Jani | 10 |
| (Switzerland) Rebellion Racing | Lola B12/60 | Toyota RV8KLM 3.4 L V8 | M | 12 | (France) Nicolas Prost | 10 |
| (United States) Dyson Racing Team | Lola B12/60 | Mazda MZR-R 2.0 L Turbo I4 (Isobutanol) | D | 16 | (United States) Chris Dyson | All |
| (United States) Dyson Racing Team | Lola B12/60 | Mazda MZR-R 2.0 L Turbo I4 (Isobutanol) | D | 16 | (United Kingdom) Guy Smith | All |
| (United States) Dyson Racing Team | Lola B12/60 | Mazda MZR-R 2.0 L Turbo I4 (Isobutanol) | D | 16 | (United Kingdom) Steven Kane | 1, 10 |
| (United States) Dyson Racing Team | Lola B12/60 | Mazda MZR-R 2.0 L Turbo I4 (Isobutanol) | D | 16 | (United Kingdom) Johnny Mowlem | 3 |
| (United States) Dyson Racing Team | Lola B11/66 | Mazda MZR-R 2.0 L Turbo I4 (Isobutanol) | D | 20 | (United States) Eric Lux | 2, 4–8 |
| (United States) Dyson Racing Team | Lola B11/66 | Mazda MZR-R 2.0 L Turbo I4 (Isobutanol) | D | 20 | (United States) Michael Marsal | 2, 4, 6–9 |
| (United States) Dyson Racing Team | Lola B11/66 | Mazda MZR-R 2.0 L Turbo I4 (Isobutanol) | D | 20 | (Canada) Tony Burgess | 5, 7, 10 |
| (United States) Dyson Racing Team | Lola B11/66 | Mazda MZR-R 2.0 L Turbo I4 (Isobutanol) | D | 20 | (United States) Mark Patterson | 9–10 |
| (United States) Dyson Racing Team | Lola B11/66 | Mazda MZR-R 2.0 L Turbo I4 (Isobutanol) | D | 20 | (United States) Chris McMurry | 10 |
P2
| (United Kingdom) Project Libra | Radical SR10 | Ford (Roush-Yates) EcoBoost 3.2 L Turbo V6 | D | 2 | (United States) Andrew Prendeville | 3 |
| (United Kingdom) Project Libra | Radical SR10 | Ford (Roush-Yates) EcoBoost 3.2 L Turbo V6 | D | 2 | (United States) Rusty Mitchell | 3 |
| (United Kingdom) Project Libra | Radical SR10 | Ford (Roush-Yates) EcoBoost 3.2 L Turbo V6 | D | 2 | (Portugal) Duarte Félix da Costa | 3 |
| (United States) Dempsey Racing | Lola B12/87 | Judd-BMW HK 3.6 L V8 | M | 27 | (United States) Patrick Dempsey | 3–4, 6–7, 10 |
| (United States) Dempsey Racing | Lola B12/87 | Judd-BMW HK 3.6 L V8 | M | 27 | (United States) Joe Foster | 3–4, 6–7, 10 |
| (United States) Dempsey Racing | Lola B12/87 | Judd-BMW HK 3.6 L V8 | M | 27 | (United Kingdom) Jonny Cocker | 3 |
| (United States) Dempsey Racing | Lola B12/87 | Judd-BMW HK 3.6 L V8 | M | 27 | (United States) Dane Cameron | 6, 10 |
| (United States) Dempsey Racing | Lola B12/87 | Judd-BMW HK 3.6 L V8 | M | 27 | (United Kingdom) Ben Devlin | 7 |
| (United States) Conquest Endurance | Morgan LMP2 | Nissan VK45DE 4.5 L V8 | D | 37 | (United Kingdom) Martin Plowman | All |
| (United States) Conquest Endurance | Morgan LMP2 | Nissan VK45DE 4.5 L V8 | D | 37 | (Denmark) David Heinemeier Hansson | All |
| (United States) Conquest Endurance | Morgan LMP2 | Nissan VK45DE 4.5 L V8 | D | 37 | (Belgium) Jan Heylen | 1 |
| (United States) Conquest Endurance | Morgan LMP2 | Nissan VK45DE 4.5 L V8 | D | 37 | (Brazil) Antônio Pizzonia | 3 |
| (United States) Conquest Endurance | Morgan LMP2 | Nissan VK45DE 4.5 L V8 | D | 37 | (United States) Eric Lux | 10 |
| (United States) Black Swan Racing | Lola B11/80 | Honda HR28TT 2.8 L Turbo V6 | D | 54 | (United States) Tim Pappas | 1–2 |
| (United States) Black Swan Racing | Lola B11/80 | Honda HR28TT 2.8 L Turbo V6 | D | 54 | (United States) Bret Curtis | 1 |
| (United States) Black Swan Racing | Lola B11/80 | Honda HR28TT 2.8 L Turbo V6 | D | 54 | (United States) Jon Fogarty | 1 |
| (United States) Black Swan Racing | Lola B11/80 | Honda HR28TT 2.8 L Turbo V6 | D | 54 | (Netherlands) Jeroen Bleekemolen | 2 |
| (United States) Level 5 Motorsports | HPD ARX-03b | Honda HR28TT 2.8 L Turbo V6 | D | 95 | (United States) Scott Tucker | All |
| (United States) Level 5 Motorsports | HPD ARX-03b | Honda HR28TT 2.8 L Turbo V6 | D | 95 | (Mexico) Luis Díaz | 1–5, 7–10 |
| (United States) Level 5 Motorsports | HPD ARX-03b | Honda HR28TT 2.8 L Turbo V6 | D | 95 | (United States) Ryan Hunter-Reay | 1 |
| (United States) Level 5 Motorsports | HPD ARX-03b | Honda HR28TT 2.8 L Turbo V6 | D | 95 | (France) Franck Montagny | 3 |
| (United States) Level 5 Motorsports | HPD ARX-03b | Honda HR28TT 2.8 L Turbo V6 | D | 95 | (Mexico) Ricardo González | 6, 8 |
| (United States) Level 5 Motorsports | HPD ARX-03b | Honda HR28TT 2.8 L Turbo V6 | D | 95 | (France) Christophe Bouchut | 10 |
| (United States) Level 5 Motorsports | HPD ARX-03b | Honda HR28TT 2.8 L Turbo V6 | D | 055 | (United States) Scott Tucker | All |
| (United States) Level 5 Motorsports | HPD ARX-03b | Honda HR28TT 2.8 L Turbo V6 | D | 055 | (France) Christophe Bouchut | 1–9 |
| (United States) Level 5 Motorsports | HPD ARX-03b | Honda HR28TT 2.8 L Turbo V6 | D | 055 | (Portugal) João Barbosa | 1–2 |
| (United States) Level 5 Motorsports | HPD ARX-03b | Honda HR28TT 2.8 L Turbo V6 | D | 055 | (France) Franck Montagny | 3 |
| (United States) Level 5 Motorsports | HPD ARX-03b | Honda HR28TT 2.8 L Turbo V6 | D | 055 | (United Kingdom) Dario Franchitti | 10 |
| (United States) Level 5 Motorsports | HPD ARX-03b | Honda HR28TT 2.8 L Turbo V6 | D | 055 | (United Kingdom) Marino Franchitti | 10 |
PC
| (United States) Muscle Milk Pickett Racing | Oreca FLM09 | Chevrolet LS3 6.2 L V8 | M | 5 | (United States) Memo Gidley | 1–3 |
| (United States) Muscle Milk Pickett Racing | Oreca FLM09 | Chevrolet LS3 6.2 L V8 | M | 5 | (United States) Mike Guasch | 1–3 |
| (United States) Muscle Milk Pickett Racing | Oreca FLM09 | Chevrolet LS3 6.2 L V8 | M | 5 | (New Zealand) Roger Wills | 1 |
| (United States) Muscle Milk Pickett Racing | Oreca FLM09 | Chevrolet LS3 6.2 L V8 | M | 5 | (United Kingdom) Archie Hamilton | 3 |
| (United States) Merchant Services Racing | Oreca FLM09 | Chevrolet LS3 6.2 L V8 | M | 7 | (United States) Chapman Ducote | 1, 3 |
| (United States) Merchant Services Racing | Oreca FLM09 | Chevrolet LS3 6.2 L V8 | M | 7 | (Mexico) Pablo Sanchez | 1, 9 |
| (United States) Merchant Services Racing | Oreca FLM09 | Chevrolet LS3 6.2 L V8 | M | 7 | (Mexico) Javier Acheverria | 1 |
| (United States) Merchant Services Racing | Oreca FLM09 | Chevrolet LS3 6.2 L V8 | M | 7 | (Australia) James Kovacic | 2, 6 |
| (United States) Merchant Services Racing | Oreca FLM09 | Chevrolet LS3 6.2 L V8 | M | 7 | (Canada) Tony Burgess | 2–3, 6, 9 |
| (United States) Merchant Services Racing | Oreca FLM09 | Chevrolet LS3 6.2 L V8 | M | 7 | (United States) Antonio Downs | 3, 7 |
| (United States) Merchant Services Racing | Oreca FLM09 | Chevrolet LS3 6.2 L V8 | M | 7 | (United States) Lucas Downs | 7–8 |
| (United States) Merchant Services Racing | Oreca FLM09 | Chevrolet LS3 6.2 L V8 | M | 7 | (United States) Matt Downs | 7–8 |
| (United States) Merchant Services Racing | Oreca FLM09 | Chevrolet LS3 6.2 L V8 | M | 8 | (Canada) Kyle Marcelli | All |
| (United States) Merchant Services Racing | Oreca FLM09 | Chevrolet LS3 6.2 L V8 | M | 8 | (United States) Lucas Downs | 1, 3, 9 |
| (United States) Merchant Services Racing | Oreca FLM09 | Chevrolet LS3 6.2 L V8 | M | 8 | (United Kingdom) Dean Sterling | 1, 3 |
| (United States) Merchant Services Racing | Oreca FLM09 | Chevrolet LS3 6.2 L V8 | M | 8 | (United States) Antonio Downs | 2, 4, 6 |
| (United States) Merchant Services Racing | Oreca FLM09 | Chevrolet LS3 6.2 L V8 | M | 8 | (United States) Matt Downs | 5, 10 |
| (United States) Merchant Services Racing | Oreca FLM09 | Chevrolet LS3 6.2 L V8 | M | 8 | (United States) Chapman Ducote | 7, 10 |
| (United States) Merchant Services Racing | Oreca FLM09 | Chevrolet LS3 6.2 L V8 | M | 8 | (United States) James French | 7 |
| (United States) Merchant Services Racing | Oreca FLM09 | Chevrolet LS3 6.2 L V8 | M | 8 | (Canada) Tony Burgess | 8 |
| (United States) RSR Racing | Oreca FLM09 | Chevrolet LS3 6.2 L V8 | M | 9 | (Brazil) Bruno Junqueira | All |
| (United States) RSR Racing | Oreca FLM09 | Chevrolet LS3 6.2 L V8 | M | 9 | (United States) Tomy Drissi | 1–6, 8–10 |
| (United States) RSR Racing | Oreca FLM09 | Chevrolet LS3 6.2 L V8 | M | 9 | (Mexico) Roberto González | 1, 3, 7 |
| (United States) RSR Racing | Oreca FLM09 | Chevrolet LS3 6.2 L V8 | M | 9 | (Puerto Rico) Ricardo Vera | 10 |
| (United States) Performance Tech Motorsports | Oreca FLM09 | Chevrolet LS3 6.2 L V8 | M | 18 | (United States) Anthony Nicolosi | 1, 3, 5–7 |
| (United States) Performance Tech Motorsports | Oreca FLM09 | Chevrolet LS3 6.2 L V8 | M | 18 | (Puerto Rico) Ricardo Vera | 1, 3, 5–7 |
| (United States) Performance Tech Motorsports | Oreca FLM09 | Chevrolet LS3 6.2 L V8 | M | 18 | (Brazil) Raphael Matos | 1, 8 |
| (United States) Performance Tech Motorsports | Oreca FLM09 | Chevrolet LS3 6.2 L V8 | M | 18 | (United States) Rodin Younessi | 8 |
| (United States) Dempsey Racing | Oreca FLM09 | Chevrolet LS3 6.2 L V8 | M | 25 | (United States) Duncan Ende | All |
| (United States) Dempsey Racing | Oreca FLM09 | Chevrolet LS3 6.2 L V8 | M | 25 | (France) Henri Richard | All |
| (United States) Dempsey Racing | Oreca FLM09 | Chevrolet LS3 6.2 L V8 | M | 25 | (United States) Dane Cameron | 1 |
| (United States) Dempsey Racing | Oreca FLM09 | Chevrolet LS3 6.2 L V8 | M | 25 | (United Kingdom) Ryan Lewis | 3, 5, 10 |
| (United States) PR1/Mathiasen Motorsports | Oreca FLM09 | Chevrolet LS3 6.2 L V8 | M | 52 | (United States) Butch Leitzinger | 1–4 |
| (United States) PR1/Mathiasen Motorsports | Oreca FLM09 | Chevrolet LS3 6.2 L V8 | M | 52 | (Mexico) Rudy Junco Jr. | 1–2, 6–7, 9–10 |
| (United States) PR1/Mathiasen Motorsports | Oreca FLM09 | Chevrolet LS3 6.2 L V8 | M | 52 | (United States) Ken Dobson | 1, 3–5, 10 |
| (United States) PR1/Mathiasen Motorsports | Oreca FLM09 | Chevrolet LS3 6.2 L V8 | M | 52 | (United Kingdom) Marino Franchitti | 5–7, 9 |
| (United States) PR1/Mathiasen Motorsports | Oreca FLM09 | Chevrolet LS3 6.2 L V8 | M | 52 | (United States) Elton Julian | 10 |
| (United States) CORE Autosport | Oreca FLM09 | Chevrolet LS3 6.2 L V8 | M | 05 | (United States) Colin Braun | All |
| (United States) CORE Autosport | Oreca FLM09 | Chevrolet LS3 6.2 L V8 | M | 05 | (United States) Jon Bennett | All |
| (United States) CORE Autosport | Oreca FLM09 | Chevrolet LS3 6.2 L V8 | M | 05 | (United States) Eric Lux | 1 |
| (United States) CORE Autosport | Oreca FLM09 | Chevrolet LS3 6.2 L V8 | M | 05 | (Mexico) Ricardo González | 10 |
| (United States) CORE Autosport | Oreca FLM09 | Chevrolet LS3 6.2 L V8 | M | 06 | (Venezuela) Alex Popow | All |
| (United States) CORE Autosport | Oreca FLM09 | Chevrolet LS3 6.2 L V8 | M | 06 | (Venezuela) E. J. Viso | 1 |
| (United States) CORE Autosport | Oreca FLM09 | Chevrolet LS3 6.2 L V8 | M | 06 | (United States) Burt Frisselle | 1 |
| (United States) CORE Autosport | Oreca FLM09 | Chevrolet LS3 6.2 L V8 | M | 06 | (United Kingdom) Ryan Dalziel | 2, 5–6, 8, 10 |
| (United States) CORE Autosport | Oreca FLM09 | Chevrolet LS3 6.2 L V8 | M | 06 | (United Kingdom) Tom Kimber-Smith | 3–4, 6, 9 |
| (United States) CORE Autosport | Oreca FLM09 | Chevrolet LS3 6.2 L V8 | M | 06 | (United States) Jon Bennett | 7 |
| (United States) CORE Autosport | Oreca FLM09 | Chevrolet LS3 6.2 L V8 | M | 06 | (Canada) Mark Wilkins | 10 |
GT
| (United States) Corvette Racing | Chevrolet Corvette C6.R | Chevrolet 5.5 L V8 | M | 3 | (Spain) Antonio García | All |
| (United States) Corvette Racing | Chevrolet Corvette C6.R | Chevrolet 5.5 L V8 | M | 3 | (Denmark) Jan Magnussen | All |
| (United States) Corvette Racing | Chevrolet Corvette C6.R | Chevrolet 5.5 L V8 | M | 3 | (United States) Jordan Taylor | 1, 10 |
| (United States) Corvette Racing | Chevrolet Corvette C6.R | Chevrolet 5.5 L V8 | M | 4 | (United Kingdom) Oliver Gavin | All |
| (United States) Corvette Racing | Chevrolet Corvette C6.R | Chevrolet 5.5 L V8 | M | 4 | (United States) Tommy Milner | All |
| (United States) Corvette Racing | Chevrolet Corvette C6.R | Chevrolet 5.5 L V8 | M | 4 | (United Kingdom) Richard Westbrook | 1, 10 |
| (United States) Team Falken Tire | Porsche 997 GT3-RSR | Porsche 4.0 L Flat-6 | F | 17 | (United States) Bryan Sellers | All |
| (United States) Team Falken Tire | Porsche 997 GT3-RSR | Porsche 4.0 L Flat-6 | F | 17 | (Germany) Wolf Henzler | All |
| (United States) Team Falken Tire | Porsche 997 GT3-RSR | Porsche 4.0 L Flat-6 | F | 17 | (Austria) Martin Ragginger | 1, 10 |
| (United States) Lotus / Alex Job Racing | Lotus Evora GTE | Toyota (Cosworth) 4.0 L V6 | Y | 23 | (United States) Bill Sweedler | 2–10 |
| (United States) Lotus / Alex Job Racing | Lotus Evora GTE | Toyota (Cosworth) 4.0 L V6 | Y | 23 | (United States) Townsend Bell | 2–10 |
| (United States) Lotus / Alex Job Racing | Lotus Evora GTE | Toyota (Cosworth) 4.0 L V6 | Y | 23 | (United Kingdom) Johnny Mowlem | 10 |
| (United States) Flying Lizard Motorsports | Porsche 997 GT3-RSR | Porsche 4.0 L Flat-6 | M | 44 | (United States) Seth Neiman | All |
| (United States) Flying Lizard Motorsports | Porsche 997 GT3-RSR | Porsche 4.0 L Flat-6 | M | 44 | (United States) Andy Lally | 1, 5 |
| (United States) Flying Lizard Motorsports | Porsche 997 GT3-RSR | Porsche 4.0 L Flat-6 | M | 44 | (United States) Darren Law | 1 |
| (United States) Flying Lizard Motorsports | Porsche 997 GT3-RSR | Porsche 4.0 L Flat-6 | M | 44 | (Germany) Marco Holzer | 2–4, 6–10 |
| (United States) Flying Lizard Motorsports | Porsche 997 GT3-RSR | Porsche 4.0 L Flat-6 | M | 44 | (United States) Patrick Long | 8 |
| (United States) Flying Lizard Motorsports | Porsche 997 GT3-RSR | Porsche 4.0 L Flat-6 | M | 44 | (United Kingdom) Nick Tandy | 10 |
| (United States) Flying Lizard Motorsports | Porsche 997 GT3-RSR | Porsche 4.0 L Flat-6 | M | 45 | (United States) Patrick Long | All |
| (United States) Flying Lizard Motorsports | Porsche 997 GT3-RSR | Porsche 4.0 L Flat-6 | M | 45 | (Germany) Jörg Bergmeister | All |
| (United States) Flying Lizard Motorsports | Porsche 997 GT3-RSR | Porsche 4.0 L Flat-6 | M | 45 | (Germany) Marco Holzer | 1 |
| (United States) Flying Lizard Motorsports | Porsche 997 GT3-RSR | Porsche 4.0 L Flat-6 | M | 45 | (Austria) Richard Lietz | 3 |
| (United States) Flying Lizard Motorsports | Porsche 997 GT3-RSR | Porsche 4.0 L Flat-6 | M | 45 | (France) Patrick Pilet | 10 |
| (United States) Paul Miller Racing | Porsche 997 GT3-RSR | Porsche 4.0 L Flat-6 | D | 48 | (United States) Bryce Miller | All |
| (United States) Paul Miller Racing | Porsche 997 GT3-RSR | Porsche 4.0 L Flat-6 | D | 48 | (Germany) Sascha Maassen | All |
| (United States) Paul Miller Racing | Porsche 997 GT3-RSR | Porsche 4.0 L Flat-6 | D | 48 | (United Kingdom) Rob Bell | 1 |
| (United States) Paul Miller Racing | Porsche 997 GT3-RSR | Porsche 4.0 L Flat-6 | D | 48 | (Austria) Richard Lietz | 10 |
| (United States) BMW Team RLL | BMW M3 GT2 | BMW 4.0 L V8 | D | 55 | (United States) Bill Auberlen | All |
| (United States) BMW Team RLL | BMW M3 GT2 | BMW 4.0 L V8 | D | 55 | (Germany) Jörg Müller | All |
| (United States) BMW Team RLL | BMW M3 GT2 | BMW 4.0 L V8 | D | 55 | (Germany) Uwe Alzen | 1 |
| (United States) BMW Team RLL | BMW M3 GT2 | BMW 4.0 L V8 | D | 55 | (United States) Jonathan Summerton | 10 |
| (United States) BMW Team RLL | BMW M3 GT2 | BMW 4.0 L V8 | D | 56 | (Germany) Dirk Müller | All |
| (United States) BMW Team RLL | BMW M3 GT2 | BMW 4.0 L V8 | D | 56 | (United States) Joey Hand | 1–6, 8 |
| (United States) BMW Team RLL | BMW M3 GT2 | BMW 4.0 L V8 | D | 56 | (United States) Jonathan Summerton | 1, 7, 9–10 |
| (United States) BMW Team RLL | BMW M3 GT2 | BMW 4.0 L V8 | D | 56 | (Germany) Uwe Alzen | 10 |
| (United States) SRT Motorsports | SRT Viper GTS-R | SRT 8.0 L V10 | M | 91 | (Canada) Kuno Wittmer | 6–8, 10 |
| (United States) SRT Motorsports | SRT Viper GTS-R | SRT 8.0 L V10 | M | 91 | (Germany) Dominik Farnbacher | 6–8, 10 |
| (United States) SRT Motorsports | SRT Viper GTS-R | SRT 8.0 L V10 | M | 91 | (United States) Ryan Hunter-Reay | 10 |
| (United States) SRT Motorsports | SRT Viper GTS-R | SRT 8.0 L V10 | M | 93 | (Belgium) Marc Goossens | 6–8, 10 |
| (United States) SRT Motorsports | SRT Viper GTS-R | SRT 8.0 L V10 | M | 93 | (United States) Tommy Kendall | 6–8, 10 |
| (United States) SRT Motorsports | SRT Viper GTS-R | SRT 8.0 L V10 | M | 93 | (United States) Jonathan Bomarito | 10 |
| (United States) Extreme Speed Motorsports | Ferrari 458 Italia GT2 | Ferrari 4.5 L V8 | M | 01 | (United States) Scott Sharp | All |
| (United States) Extreme Speed Motorsports | Ferrari 458 Italia GT2 | Ferrari 4.5 L V8 | M | 01 | (United States) Johannes van Overbeek | All |
| (United States) Extreme Speed Motorsports | Ferrari 458 Italia GT2 | Ferrari 4.5 L V8 | M | 01 | (United States) Guy Cosmo | 1 |
| (United States) Extreme Speed Motorsports | Ferrari 458 Italia GT2 | Ferrari 4.5 L V8 | M | 01 | (Finland) Toni Vilander | 10 |
| (United States) Extreme Speed Motorsports | Ferrari 458 Italia GT2 | Ferrari 4.5 L V8 | M | 02 | (United States) Ed Brown | All |
| (United States) Extreme Speed Motorsports | Ferrari 458 Italia GT2 | Ferrari 4.5 L V8 | M | 02 | (United States) Anthony Lazzaro | 1, 7, 10 |
| (United States) Extreme Speed Motorsports | Ferrari 458 Italia GT2 | Ferrari 4.5 L V8 | M | 02 | (United States) Jeff Segal | 1 |
| (United States) Extreme Speed Motorsports | Ferrari 458 Italia GT2 | Ferrari 4.5 L V8 | M | 02 | (United States) Guy Cosmo | 2–10 |
| (United Kingdom) Aston Martin Racing | Aston Martin Vantage GTE | Aston Martin 4.5 L V8 | M | 007 | (Mexico) Adrián Fernández | 2–3 |
| (United Kingdom) Aston Martin Racing | Aston Martin Vantage GTE | Aston Martin 4.5 L V8 | M | 007 | (United Kingdom) Darren Turner | 2–3 |
| (United Kingdom) Aston Martin Racing | Aston Martin Vantage GTE | Aston Martin 4.5 L V8 | M | 007 | (Germany) Stefan Mücke | 3 |
GTC
| (United States) JDX Racing | Porsche 997 GT3 Cup | Porsche 4.0 L Flat-6 | Y | 11 | (Canada) Chris Cumming | 1–5, 8–10 |
| (United States) JDX Racing | Porsche 997 GT3 Cup | Porsche 4.0 L Flat-6 | Y | 11 | (France) Kévin Estre | 1 |
| (United States) JDX Racing | Porsche 997 GT3 Cup | Porsche 4.0 L Flat-6 | Y | 11 | (Germany) Mark Bullitt | 1 |
| (United States) JDX Racing | Porsche 997 GT3 Cup | Porsche 4.0 L Flat-6 | Y | 11 | (Canada) Michael Valiante | 2, 4–5, 8–10 |
| (United States) JDX Racing | Porsche 997 GT3 Cup | Porsche 4.0 L Flat-6 | Y | 11 | (Hong Kong) Matthew Marsh | 3 |
| (United States) JDX Racing | Porsche 997 GT3 Cup | Porsche 4.0 L Flat-6 | Y | 11 | (Austria) Martin Ragginger | 3 |
| (United States) JDX Racing | Porsche 997 GT3 Cup | Porsche 4.0 L Flat-6 | Y | 11 | (United States) Tim Pappas | 6–7 |
| (United States) JDX Racing | Porsche 997 GT3 Cup | Porsche 4.0 L Flat-6 | Y | 11 | (Netherlands) Jeroen Bleekemolen | 6–7 |
| (United States) JDX Racing | Porsche 997 GT3 Cup | Porsche 4.0 L Flat-6 | Y | 11 | (United States) Sean Johnston | 10 |
| (United States) Alex Job Racing | Porsche 997 GT3 Cup | Porsche 4.0 L Flat-6 | Y | 22 | (United States) Cooper MacNeil | All |
| (United States) Alex Job Racing | Porsche 997 GT3 Cup | Porsche 4.0 L Flat-6 | Y | 22 | (United States) Leh Keen | 1–2, 4–6, 8–10 |
| (United States) Alex Job Racing | Porsche 997 GT3 Cup | Porsche 4.0 L Flat-6 | Y | 22 | (Canada) Louis-Philippe Dumoulin | 1 |
| (United States) Alex Job Racing | Porsche 997 GT3 Cup | Porsche 4.0 L Flat-6 | Y | 22 | (United States) Anthony Lazzaro | 3 |
| (United States) Alex Job Racing | Porsche 997 GT3 Cup | Porsche 4.0 L Flat-6 | Y | 22 | (Netherlands) Jeroen Bleekemolen | 7 |
| (United States) Alex Job Racing | Porsche 997 GT3 Cup | Porsche 4.0 L Flat-6 | Y | 22 | (South Africa) Dion von Moltke | 10 |
| (United States) Alex Job Racing | Porsche 997 GT3 Cup | Porsche 4.0 L Flat-6 | Y | 23 | (United States) Bill Sweedler | 1 |
| (United States) Alex Job Racing | Porsche 997 GT3 Cup | Porsche 4.0 L Flat-6 | Y | 23 | (United States) Townsend Bell | 1 |
| (United States) Alex Job Racing | Porsche 997 GT3 Cup | Porsche 4.0 L Flat-6 | Y | 23 | (South Africa) Dion von Moltke | 1 |
| (United States) Competition Motorsports | Porsche 997 GT3 Cup | Porsche 4.0 L Flat-6 | Y | 24 | (United States) Bob Faieta | 1–3, 7, 9–10 |
| (United States) Competition Motorsports | Porsche 997 GT3 Cup | Porsche 4.0 L Flat-6 | Y | 24 | (United States) Michael Avenatti | 1–3, 7, 9–10 |
| (United States) Competition Motorsports | Porsche 997 GT3 Cup | Porsche 4.0 L Flat-6 | Y | 24 | (United States) Cort Wagner | 1, 3 |
| (United States) Competition Motorsports | Porsche 997 GT3 Cup | Porsche 4.0 L Flat-6 | Y | 24 | (Australia) David Calvert-Jones | 10 |
| (United States) NGT Motorsport | Porsche 997 GT3 Cup | Porsche 4.0 L Flat-6 | Y | 30 | (Venezuela) Henrique Cisneros | 1, 9–10 |
| (United States) NGT Motorsport | Porsche 997 GT3 Cup | Porsche 4.0 L Flat-6 | Y | 30 | (United Kingdom) Sean Edwards | 1 |
| (United States) NGT Motorsport | Porsche 997 GT3 Cup | Porsche 4.0 L Flat-6 | Y | 30 | (United States) Carlos Kauffman | 1 |
| (United States) NGT Motorsport | Porsche 997 GT3 Cup | Porsche 4.0 L Flat-6 | Y | 30 | (Netherlands) Jeroen Bleekemolen | 9 |
| (United States) NGT Motorsport | Porsche 997 GT3 Cup | Porsche 4.0 L Flat-6 | Y | 30 | (Germany) Mario Farnbacher | 10 |
| (United States) NGT Motorsport | Porsche 997 GT3 Cup | Porsche 4.0 L Flat-6 | Y | 30 | (Poland) Kuba Giermaziak | 10 |
| (United States) NGT Motorsport | Porsche 997 GT3 Cup | Porsche 4.0 L Flat-6 | Y | 31 | (Venezuela) Angel Benitez Jr. | 1–2, 7, 9–10 |
| (United States) NGT Motorsport | Porsche 997 GT3 Cup | Porsche 4.0 L Flat-6 | Y | 31 | (Venezuela) Angel Benitez Sr. | 1–2, 7, 9 |
| (United States) NGT Motorsport | Porsche 997 GT3 Cup | Porsche 4.0 L Flat-6 | Y | 31 | (Denmark) Nicki Thiim | 1 |
| (United States) NGT Motorsport | Porsche 997 GT3 Cup | Porsche 4.0 L Flat-6 | Y | 31 | (United States) Mark Bullitt | 10 |
| (United States) NGT Motorsport | Porsche 997 GT3 Cup | Porsche 4.0 L Flat-6 | Y | 31 | (United States) Jeff Segal | 10 |
| (United States) GMG Racing | Porsche 997 GT3 Cup | Porsche 4.0 L Flat-6 | Y | 32 | (United States) James Sofronas | 1–4, 7 |
| (United States) GMG Racing | Porsche 997 GT3 Cup | Porsche 4.0 L Flat-6 | Y | 32 | (United States) Alex Welch | 1–4, 7 |
| (United States) GMG Racing | Porsche 997 GT3 Cup | Porsche 4.0 L Flat-6 | Y | 32 | (United States) Rene Villeneuve | 1, 3, 7 |
| (United States) Green Hornet Racing | Porsche 997 GT3 Cup | Porsche 4.0 L Flat-6 | Y | 33 | (United States) Peter LeSaffre | 4, 10 |
| (United States) Green Hornet Racing | Porsche 997 GT3 Cup | Porsche 4.0 L Flat-6 | Y | 33 | (United States) Anthony Lazzaro | 4 |
| (United States) Green Hornet Racing | Porsche 997 GT3 Cup | Porsche 4.0 L Flat-6 | Y | 33 | (United States) Bob Faieta | 6 |
| (United States) Green Hornet Racing | Porsche 997 GT3 Cup | Porsche 4.0 L Flat-6 | Y | 33 | (Netherlands) Patrick Huisman | 6–7 |
| (United States) Green Hornet Racing | Porsche 997 GT3 Cup | Porsche 4.0 L Flat-6 | Y | 33 | (United States) Brian Wong | 7, 10 |
| (United States) Green Hornet Racing | Porsche 997 GT3 Cup | Porsche 4.0 L Flat-6 | Y | 33 | (Republic of Ireland) Damien Faulkner | 10 |
| (United States) Green Hornet Racing | Porsche 997 GT3 Cup | Porsche 4.0 L Flat-6 | Y | 34 | (United States) Peter LeSaffre | 1–9 |
| (United States) Green Hornet Racing | Porsche 997 GT3 Cup | Porsche 4.0 L Flat-6 | Y | 34 | (Republic of Ireland) Damien Faulkner | 1–9 |
| (United States) Green Hornet Racing | Porsche 997 GT3 Cup | Porsche 4.0 L Flat-6 | Y | 34 | (Netherlands) Sebastiaan Bleekemolen | 1, 3 |
| (United States) TRG | Porsche 997 GT3 Cup | Porsche 4.0 L Flat-6 | Y | 66 | (Venezuela) Emilio Di Guida | 1–3, 5, 7, 9–10 |
| (United States) TRG | Porsche 997 GT3 Cup | Porsche 4.0 L Flat-6 | Y | 66 | (United States) Spencer Pumpelly | 1–2, 4–10 |
| (United States) TRG | Porsche 997 GT3 Cup | Porsche 4.0 L Flat-6 | Y | 66 | (United States) Marc Bunting | 1, 8 |
| (United States) TRG | Porsche 997 GT3 Cup | Porsche 4.0 L Flat-6 | Y | 66 | (Netherlands) Jeroen Bleekemolen | 3 |
| (United States) TRG | Porsche 997 GT3 Cup | Porsche 4.0 L Flat-6 | Y | 66 | (United States) Mike Piera | 4 |
| (United States) TRG | Porsche 997 GT3 Cup | Porsche 4.0 L Flat-6 | Y | 66 | (United States) Al Carter | 6 |
| (United States) TRG | Porsche 997 GT3 Cup | Porsche 4.0 L Flat-6 | Y | 66 | (Venezuela) Nelson Canache Jr. | 10 |
| (United States) TRG | Porsche 997 GT3 Cup | Porsche 4.0 L Flat-6 | Y | 68 | (United States) Mike Hedlund | 3, 10 |
| (United States) TRG | Porsche 997 GT3 Cup | Porsche 4.0 L Flat-6 | Y | 68 | (United States) Tracy Krohn | 3 |
| (United States) TRG | Porsche 997 GT3 Cup | Porsche 4.0 L Flat-6 | Y | 68 | (United Kingdom) Nick Tandy | 3 |
| (United States) TRG | Porsche 997 GT3 Cup | Porsche 4.0 L Flat-6 | Y | 68 | (United States) Al Carter | 8 |
| (United States) TRG | Porsche 997 GT3 Cup | Porsche 4.0 L Flat-6 | Y | 68 | (France) Patrick Pilet | 8 |
| (United States) TRG | Porsche 997 GT3 Cup | Porsche 4.0 L Flat-6 | Y | 68 | (Mexico) Manuel Gutierrez Jr. | 10 |
| (United States) TRG | Porsche 997 GT3 Cup | Porsche 4.0 L Flat-6 | Y | 68 | (France) Emmanuel Collard | 10 |

=== Team announcements ===
- On November 11, 2011, it was announced that Rolex Sports Car Series team Dempsey Racing, owned by Hollywood actor/driver Patrick Dempsey and driver Joe Foster, and Silicon Tech Racing (STR), owned by racer Henri Richard, would partner, creating Silicon Tech/Dempsey Racing, to campaign an Oreca FLM09 in the LMP Challenge class for the 2012 season. Later in March, Dempsey announced that they will be fielding an LMP2 car in the 2012 ALMS season.
- Aston Martin Racing will be returning to GT for the 2012 season after fielding a prototype for several years. In addition to the 12 Hours of Sebring for the WEC, AMR will also participate in the Long Beach and Monterey rounds to prepare for the 24 Hours of Le Mans.
- Lotus will also be fielding a team with Alex Job Racing.
- SRT Motorsports will be fielding a two-car factory backed GTE effort in a Riley Technologies developed Dodge Viper. Drivers include Kuno Wittmer, Dominik Farnbacher, Tommy Kendall and Marc Goossens. The car has received a waiver from ACO as its 8.4L V10 engine is above the maximum displacement of 5.5L allowed by the rules. The team will debut the cars at the Mid-Ohio round.
- Libra Racing will enter a Radical SR10 using a Roush-Yates Ford Ecoboost V6 into P2 from Laguna Seca onward.

== Results and standings ==
Overall winners in bold.

| Rnd | Circuit | P1 Winning Team | P2 Winning Team | PC Winning Team | GT Winning Team | GTC Winning Team | Report |
| Rnd | Circuit | P1 Winning Drivers | P2 Winning Drivers | PC Winning Drivers | GT Winning Drivers | GTC Winning Drivers | Report |
|---|---|---|---|---|---|---|---|
| 1 | Sebring | (United States) #016 Dyson Racing Team | **(United States) #055 Level 5 Motorsports** | (United States) #06 CORE Autosport | (United States) #56 BMW Team RLL | (United States) #023 Alex Job Racing | Report |
| 1 | Sebring | (United States) Chris Dyson (United Kingdom) Guy Smith (United Kingdom) Steven Kane | **(United States) Scott Tucker** **(Portugal) João Barbosa** **(France) Christophe Bouchut** | (Venezuela) E. J. Viso (Venezuela) Alex Popow (United States) Burt Frisselle | (Germany) Dirk Müller (United States) Joey Hand (United States) Jonathan Summerton | (United States) Bill Sweedler (United States) Townsend Bell (South Africa) Dion von Moltke | Report |
| 2 | Long Beach | **(United States) #6 Muscle Milk Pickett Racing** | (United States) #055 Level 5 Motorsports | (United States) #06 CORE Autosport | (United States) #4 Corvette Racing | (United States) #34 Green Hornet Racing | Report |
| 2 | Long Beach | **(Germany) Klaus Graf** **(Germany) Lucas Luhr** | (United States) Scott Tucker (France) Christophe Bouchut | (Venezuela) Alex Popow (United Kingdom) Ryan Dalziel | (United Kingdom) Oliver Gavin (United States) Tommy Milner | (United States) Peter LeSaffre (Republic of Ireland) Damien Faulkner | Report |
| 3 | Laguna Seca | **(United States) #6 Muscle Milk Pickett Racing** | (United States) #95 Level 5 Motorsports | (United States) #05 CORE Autosport | (United States) #4 Corvette Racing | (United States) #66 TRG | Report |
| 3 | Laguna Seca | **(Germany) Klaus Graf** **(Germany) Lucas Luhr** | (United States) Scott Tucker (Mexico) Luis Díaz (France) Franck Montagny | (United States) Jon Bennett (United States) Colin Braun | (United Kingdom) Oliver Gavin (United States) Tommy Milner | (Venezuela) Emilio Di Guida (Netherlands) Jeroen Bleekemolen (United States) Bret Curtis | Report |
| 4 | Lime Rock | **(United States) #6 Muscle Milk Pickett Racing** | (United States) #055 Level 5 Motorsports | (United States) #05 CORE Autosport | (United States) #45 Flying Lizard Motorsports | (United States) #22 Alex Job Racing | Report |
| 4 | Lime Rock | **(Germany) Klaus Graf** **(Germany) Lucas Luhr** | (United States) Scott Tucker (France) Christophe Bouchut | (United States) Jon Bennett (United States) Colin Braun | (Germany) Jörg Bergmeister (United States) Patrick Long | (United States) Leh Keen (United States) Cooper MacNeil | Report |
| 5 | Mosport | **(United States) #6 Muscle Milk Pickett Racing** | (United States) #37 Conquest Racing | (United States) #9 RSR Racing | (United States) #01 Extreme Speed Motorsports | (United States) #66 TRG | Report |
| 5 | Mosport | **(Germany) Klaus Graf** **(Germany) Lucas Luhr** | (United Kingdom) Martin Plowman (Denmark) David Heinemeier Hansson | (Brazil) Bruno Junqueira (United States) Tomy Drissi | (United States) Scott Sharp (United States) Johannes van Overbeek | (Venezuela) Emilio Di Guida (United States) Spencer Pumpelly | Report |
| 6 | Mid-Ohio | **(United States) #6 Muscle Milk Pickett Racing** | (United States) #055 Level 5 Motorsports | (United States) #52 PR1/Mathiasen Motorsports | (United States) #4 Corvette Racing | (United States) #11 JDX Racing | Report |
| 6 | Mid-Ohio | **(Germany) Klaus Graf** **(Germany) Lucas Luhr** | (United States) Scott Tucker (France) Christophe Bouchut | (United Kingdom) Marino Franchitti (Mexico) Rudy Junco Jr. | (United Kingdom) Oliver Gavin (United States) Tommy Milner | (United States) Tim Pappas (Netherlands) Jeroen Bleekemolen | Report |
| 7 | Road America | **(United States) #16 Dyson Racing Team** | (United States) #37 Conquest Racing | (United States) #06 CORE Autosport | (United States) #55 BMW Team RLL | (United States) #22 Alex Job Racing | Report |
| 7 | Road America | **(United States) Chris Dyson** **(United Kingdom) Guy Smith** | (United Kingdom) Martin Plowman (Denmark) David Heinemeier Hansson | (Venezuela) Alex Popow (United Kingdom) Tom Kimber-Smith (United States) Jon Bennett | (United States) Bill Auberlen (Germany) Jörg Müller | (United States) Cooper MacNeil (Netherlands) Jeroen Bleekemolen | Report |
| 8 | Baltimore | (United States) #20 Dyson Racing Team | **(United States) #055 Level 5 Motorsports** | (United States) #06 CORE Autosport | (United States) #17 Team Falken Tire | (United States) #68 TRG | Report |
| 8 | Baltimore | (United States) Michael Marsal (United States) Eric Lux | **(United States) Scott Tucker** **(France) Christophe Bouchut** | (Venezuela) Alex Popow (United Kingdom) Ryan Dalziel | (Germany) Wolf Henzler (United States) Bryan Sellers | (United States) Al Carter (France) Patrick Pilet | Report |
| 9 | Virginia | **(United States) #6 Muscle Milk Pickett Racing** | (United States) #055 Level 5 Motorsports | (United States) #05 CORE Autosport | (United States) #4 Corvette Racing | (United States) #22 Alex Job Racing | Report |
| 9 | Virginia | **(Germany) Klaus Graf** **(Germany) Lucas Luhr** | (United States) Scott Tucker (France) Christophe Bouchut | (United States) Jon Bennett (United States) Colin Braun | (United Kingdom) Oliver Gavin (United States) Tommy Milner | (United States) Cooper MacNeil (United States) Leh Keen | Report |
| 10 | Road Atlanta | **(Switzerland) #12 Rebellion Racing** | (United States) #95 Level 5 Motorsports | (United States) #06 CORE Autosport | (United States) #01 Extreme Speed Motorsports | (United States) #30 NGT Motorsport | Report |
| 10 | Road Atlanta | **(Switzerland) Neel Jani** **(France) Nicolas Prost** **(Italy) Andrea Belicchi** | (United States) Scott Tucker (France) Christophe Bouchut (Mexico) Luis Díaz | (Venezuela) Alex Popow (United Kingdom) Ryan Dalziel (Canada) Mark Wilkins | (United States) Scott Sharp (United States) Johannes van Overbeek (Finland) Toni Vilander | (Venezuela) Henrique Cisneros (Germany) Mario Farnbacher (Poland) Kuba Giermaziak | Report |

== Championships ==
Points were awarded to the top ten cars and drivers which complete at least 70% of their class winner's distance. Teams with multiple entries only score the points of their highest finishing entry in each race. Drivers were required to drive a minimum of 45 minutes to earn points, except for the Long Beach event which required only 30 minutes. Drivers are required to complete a particular amount of the minimum number of laps in order to earn points. The number of laps vary depending on the course size.

Points System
| Race Distance | Position | | | | | | | | | |
| Race Distance | 1st | 2nd | 3rd | 4th | 5th | 6th | 7th | 8th | 9th | 10th |
|---|---|---|---|---|---|---|---|---|---|---|
| Less than four hours | 20 | 16 | 13 | 10 | 8 | 6 | 4 | 3 | 2 | 1 |
| Between four and eight hours | 22 | 18 | 15 | 12 | 10 | 8 | 6 | 5 | 4 | 3 |
| More than eight hours | 24 | 20 | 17 | 14 | 12 | 10 | 8 | 7 | 6 | 5 |

=== Team championships ===
Teams with full season entries are awarded points in the team championships. Teams which participated in a partial season or on a race-by-race basis are not included in these championships.

As long as they compete full season and comply with ACO regulations, the top P1, P2 and GT team at the end of the season receive an automatic entry to the 2013 24 Hours of Le Mans.

==== P1 standings ====
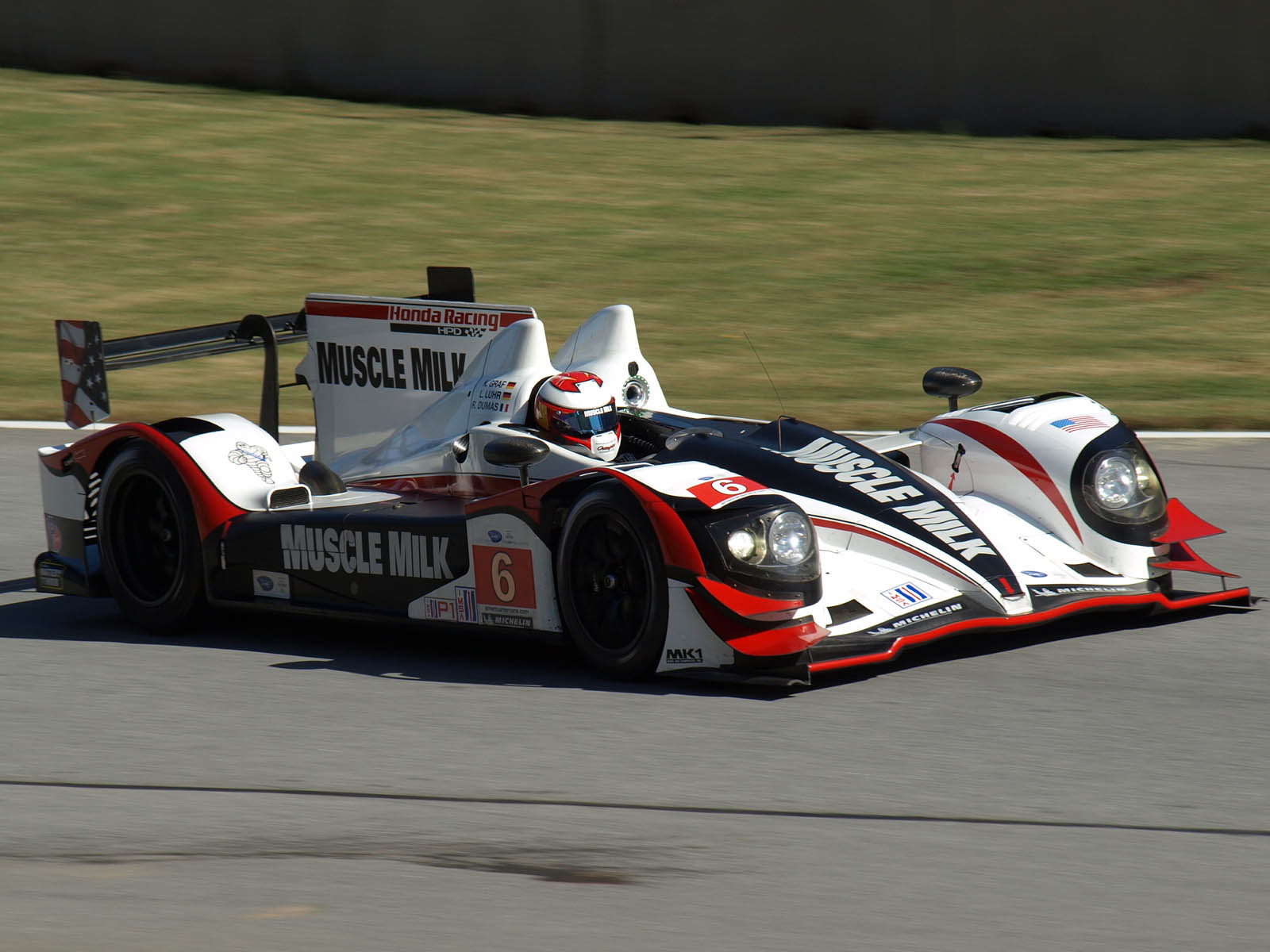
Muscle Milk Pickett Racing won the championship in P1.

| Pos | Team | Chassis | Engine | SEB | LBH | LGA | LRP | MOS | MOH | RAM | BGP | VIR | PLM | Total |
|---|---|---|---|---|---|---|---|---|---|---|---|---|---|---|
| 1 | (United States) Muscle Milk Pickett Racing | HPD ARX-03a | Honda LM-V8 3.4 L V8 | 20 | 20 | 22 | 20 | 20 | 20 | 18 | 13 | 22 | 20 | **195** |
| 2 | (United States) Dyson Racing Team | Lola B12/60 | Mazda MZR-R 2.0 L Turbo I4 | 24 | 16 | 18 | 16 | 16 | 16 | 22 | 20 | 18 | 24 | **190** |

==== P2 standings ====
| Pos | Team | Chassis | Engine | SEB | LBH | LGA | LRP | MOS | MOH | RAM | BGP | VIR | PLM | Total |
|---|---|---|---|---|---|---|---|---|---|---|---|---|---|---|
| 1 | (United States) Level 5 Motorsports | HPD ARX-03b | Honda HR28TT 2.8 L Turbo V6 | 24 | 20 | 22 | 20 | 16 | 20 | 15 | 20 | 22 | 24 | **203** |
| 2 | (United States) Conquest Endurance | Morgan LMP2 | Nissan VK45DE 4.5 L V8 | 17 | 16 | 18 | 16 | 20 | 16 | 22 | 13 | 18 | 0 | **156** |
| 3 | (United States) Dempsey Racing | Lola B12/87 | Judd-BMW HK 3.6 L V8 | | | 12 | 13 | | 10 | 18 | | | 0 | **53** |
| 4 | (United States) Black Swan Racing | Lola B11/80 | Honda HR28TT 2.8 L Turbo V6 | 20 | 0 | | | | | | | | | **20** |

==== PC standings ====
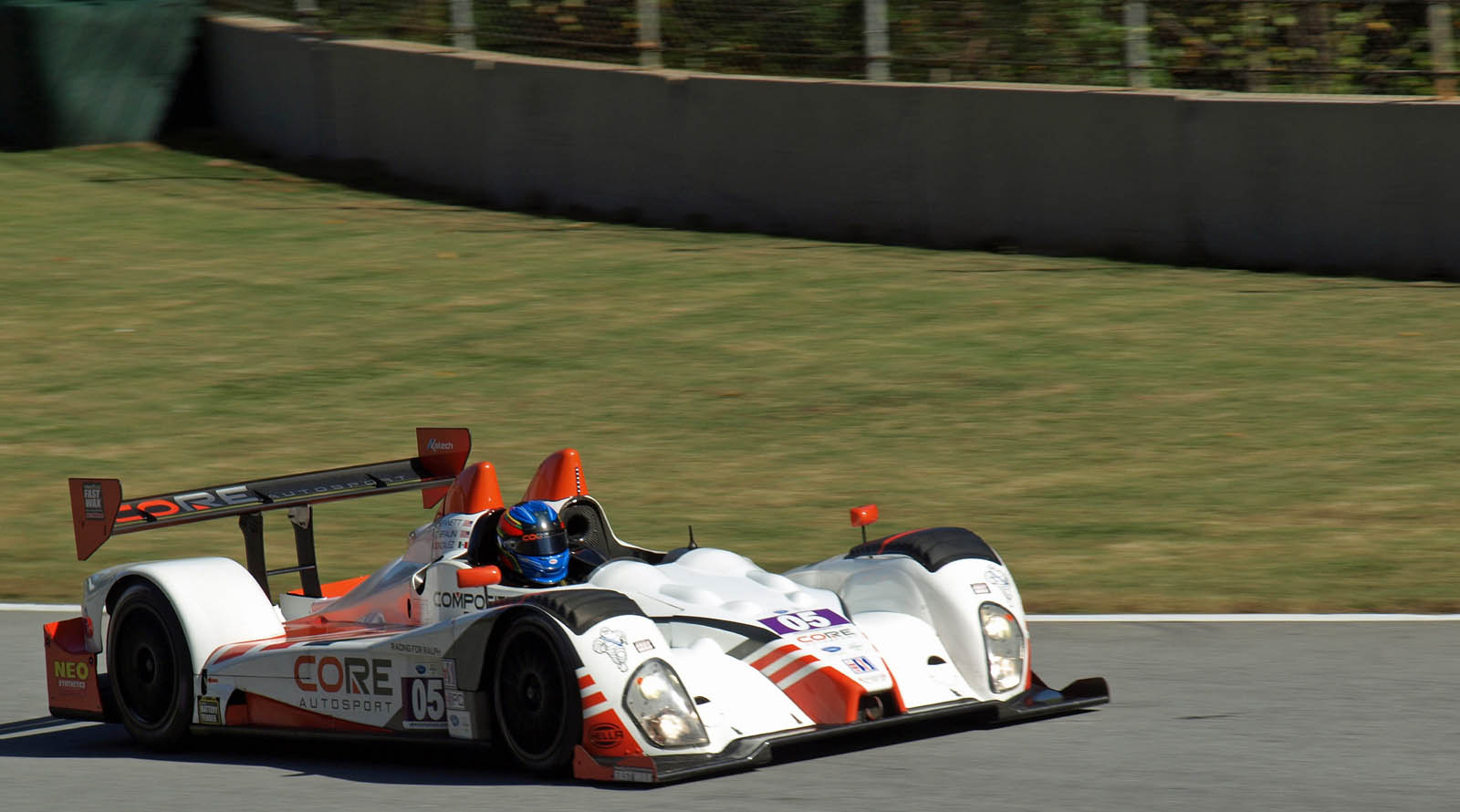
CORE Autosport won their second consecutive PC championship

All teams utilize the Oreca FLM09 chassis with Chevrolet LS3 engine.

| Pos | Team | SEB | LBH | LGA | LRP | MOS | MOH | RAM | BGP | VIR | PLM | Total |
|---|---|---|---|---|---|---|---|---|---|---|---|---|
| 1 | (United States) CORE Autosport | 24 | 20 | 22 | 20 | 16 | 16 | 22 | 20 | 22 | 24 | 206 |
| 2 | (United States) RSR Racing | 8 | 4 | 18 | 8 | 20 | 0 | 12 | 16 | 12 | 20 | 118 |
| 3 | (United States) Merchant Services Racing | 14 | 10 | 10 | 0 | 8 | 13 | 15 | 10 | 8 | 12 | 100 |
| 4 | (United States) PR1/Mathiasen Motorsports | 20 | 6 | 8 | 10 | 0 | 20 | 0 | | 18 | 17 | 99 |
| 5 | (United States) Dempsey Racing | 0 | 8 | 6 | 13 | 10 | 10 | 10 | 13 | 10 | 10 | 90 |
| 6 | (United States) Muscle Milk Pickett Racing | 12 | 16 | 12 | | | | | | | | 40 |
| 7 | (United States) Performance Tech Motorsports | 10 | | 5 | | | | | 0 | | | 15 |

==== GT standings ====
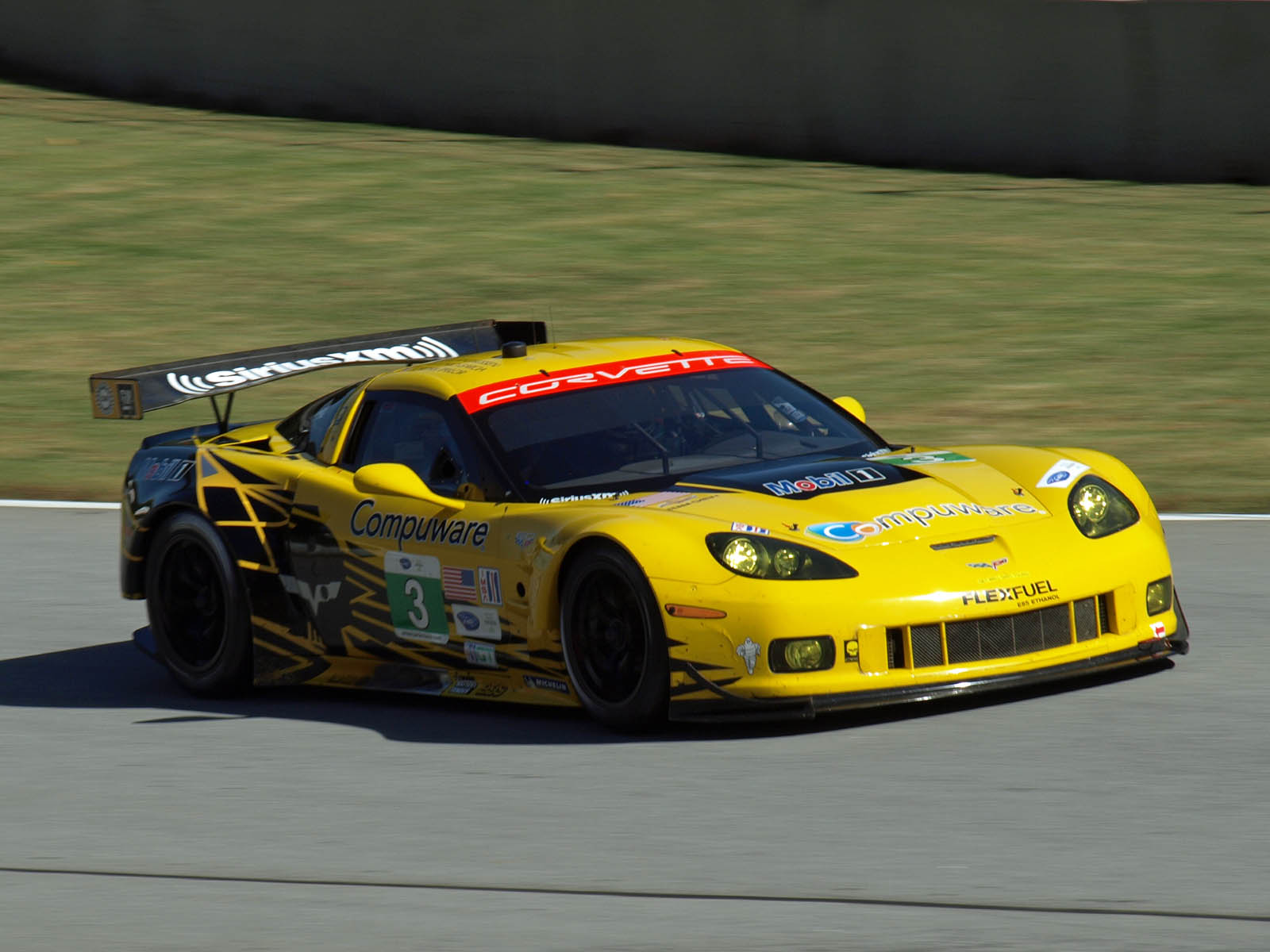
Corvette Racing won their 9th ALMS team championship.

| Pos | Team | Chassis | Engine | SEB | LBH | LGA | LRP | MOS | MOH | RAM | BGP | VIR | PLM | Total |
|---|---|---|---|---|---|---|---|---|---|---|---|---|---|---|
| 1 | (United States) Corvette Racing | Chevrolet Corvette C6.R | Chevrolet 5.5 L V8 | 20 | 20 | 22 | 16 | 16 | 20 | 15 | 16 | 22 | 20 | 187 |
| 2 | (United States) BMW Team RLL | BMW M3 GT2 | BMW 4.0 L V8 | 24 | 16 | 15 | 8 | 13 | 13 | 22 | 10 | 12 | 17 | 150 |
| 3 | (United States) Extreme Speed Motorsports | Ferrari 458 Italia GT2 | Ferrari 4.5 L V8 | 8 | 13 | 10 | 10 | 20 | 6 | 6 | 13 | 15 | 24 | 125 |
| 4 | (United States) Flying Lizard Motorsports | Porsche 997 GT3-RSR | Porsche 4.0 L Flat-6 | 10 | 6 | 8 | 20 | 6 | 16 | 18 | 8 | 18 | 12 | 122 |
| 5 | (United States) Team Falken Tire | Porsche 997 GT3-RSR | Porsche 4.0 L Flat-6 | 7 | 8 | 6 | 4 | 10 | 10 | 0 | 20 | 6 | 10 | 81 |
| 6 | (United States) Paul Miller Racing | Porsche 997 GT3-RSR | Porsche 4.0 L Flat-6 | 12 | 4 | 4 | 3 | 8 | 2 | 12 | 2 | 3 | 5 | 55 |
| 7 | (United States) Lotus / Alex Job Racing | Lotus Evora GTE | Cosworth 4.0 L V6 | | 0 | 0 | 1 | 3 | 0 | 8 | 1 | 8 | 0 | 21 |
| 8 | (United States) SRT Motorsports | SRT Viper GTS-R | SRT 8.0 L V10 | | | | | | 1 | 4 | 0 | | 7 | 12 |

==== GTC standings ====
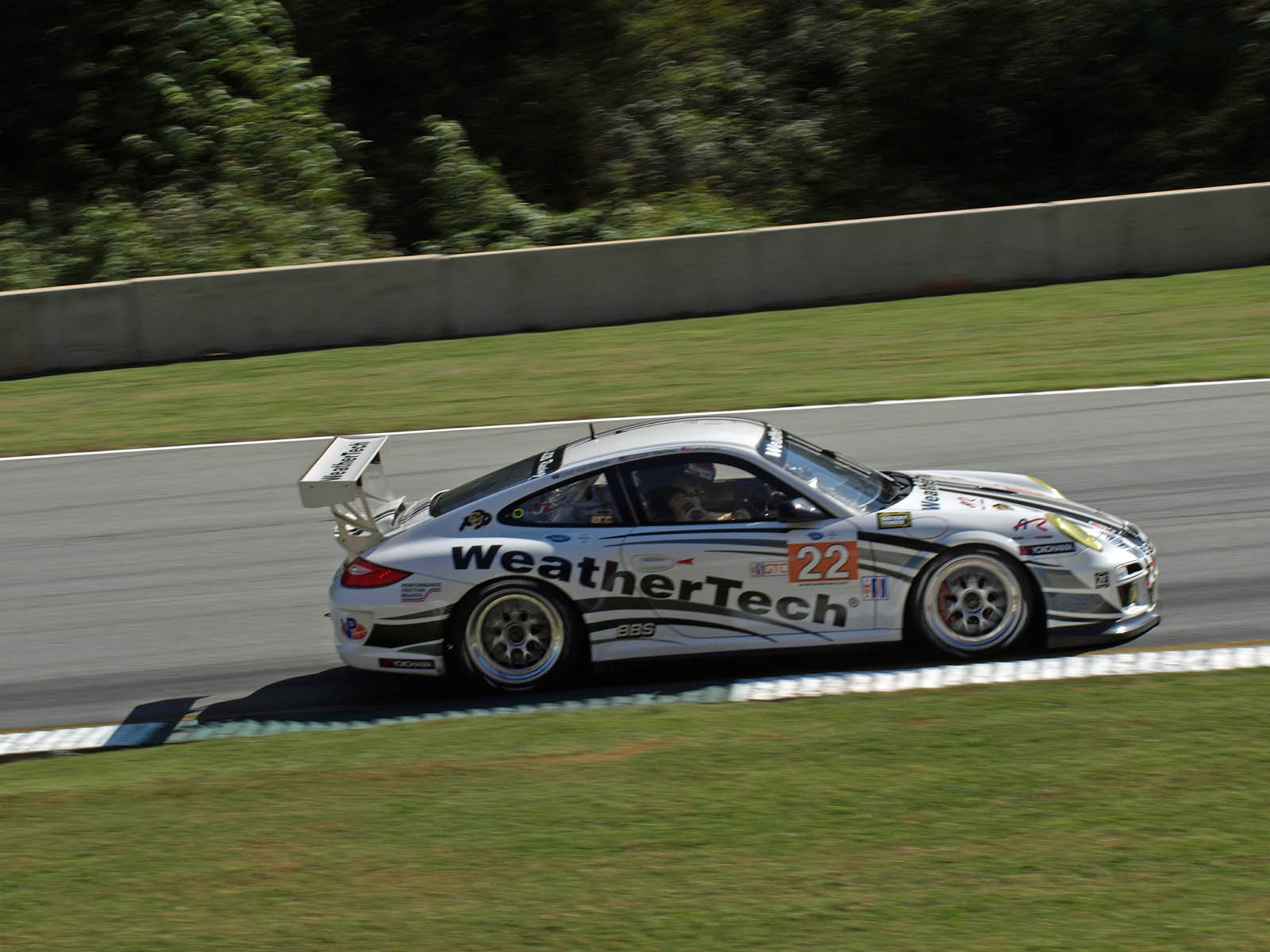
2012 marked the 4th ALMS championship for Alex Job Racing.

All teams utilize variations of the Porsche 997 GT3 Cup.

| Pos | Team | SEB | LBH | LGA | LRP | MOS | MOH | RAM | BGP | VIR | PLM | Total |
|---|---|---|---|---|---|---|---|---|---|---|---|---|
| 1 | (United States) Alex Job Racing | 24 | 16 | 12 | 20 | 16 | 13 | 22 | 20 | 22 | 14 | 179 |
| 2 | (United States) TRG | 14 | 8 | 22 | 6 | 20 | 20 | 5 | 13 | 10 | 20 | 138 |
| 3 | (United States) Green Hornet Racing | 17 | 20 | 10 | 16 | 0 | 16 | 15 | 16 | 12 | 0 | 122 |
| 4 | (United States) JDX Racing | 12 | 13 | 0 | 10 | 13 | 0 | 18 | 10 | 15 | 17 | 108 |
| 5 | (United States) GMG Racing | 8 | 10 | 18 | 13 | | | 10 | | | | 59 |
| 6 | (United States) NGT Motorsports | 7 | | | | | | 6 | | 18 | 24 | 55 |
| 7 | (United States) Competition Motorsports | 10 | 6 | 15 | | | | 12 | | 6 | 0 | 49 |

Note: the #11 JDX Racing car won the Mid-Ohio round but driver Tim Pappas failed to meet the minimum driving time requirement. JDX was allowed to keep their "win" but the first place points and prize money went to the #66 TRG car for that race.

=== Driver championships ===
Drivers who participated in races but failed to score points over the course of the season are not listed.

==== P1 standings ====
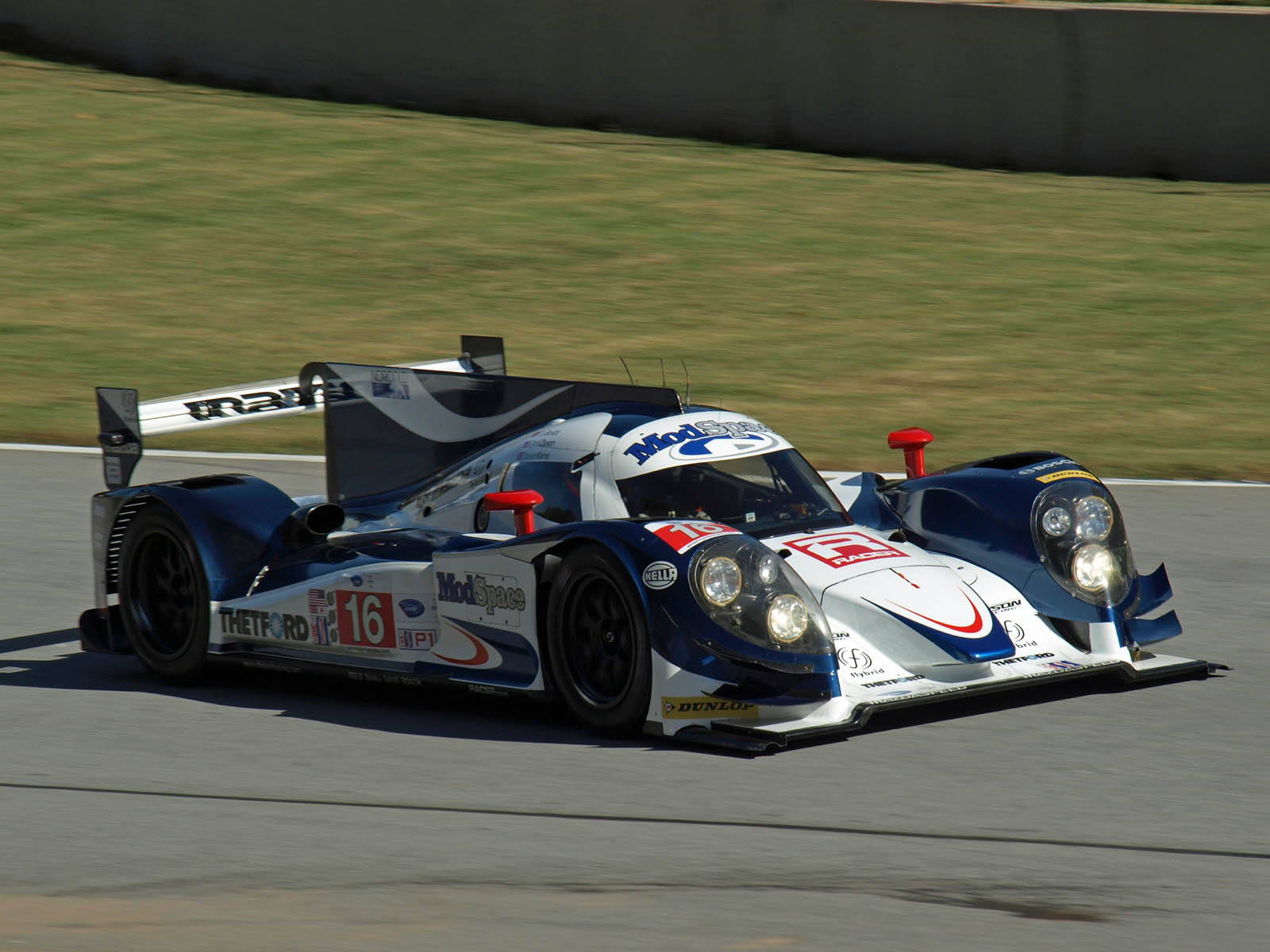
Chris Dyson and Guy Smith of Dyson Racing finished runners-up in P1.

| Pos | Driver | Team | SEB | LBH | LGA | LRP | MOS | MOH | RAM | BGP | VIR | PLM | Total |
|---|---|---|---|---|---|---|---|---|---|---|---|---|---|
| 1 | (Germany) Klaus Graf | (United States) Muscle Milk Pickett Racing | 20 | 20 | 22 | 20 | 20 | 20 | 18 | 13 | 22 | 20 | 195 |
| 1 | (Germany) Lucas Luhr | (United States) Muscle Milk Pickett Racing | 20 | 20 | 22 | 20 | 20 | 20 | 18 | 13 | 22 | 20 | 195 |
| 2 | (United States) Chris Dyson | (United States) Dyson Racing Team | 24 | 16 | 18 | 16 | 16 | 16 | 22 | 16 | 18 | 24 | 186 |
| 2 | (United Kingdom) Guy Smith | (United States) Dyson Racing Team | 24 | 16 | 18 | 16 | 16 | 16 | 22 | 16 | 18 | 24 | 186 |
| 3 | (United States) Eric Lux | (United States) Dyson Racing Team | | 13 | | 13 | 13 | 13 | 15 | 20 | | | 87 |
| 4 | (United States) Michael Marsal | (United States) Dyson Racing Team | | 13 | | 13 | | 13 | 15 | 20 | 0 | | 74 |
| 5 | (United Kingdom) Steven Kane | (United States) Dyson Racing Team | 24 | | | | | | | | | 24 | 48 |
| 6 | (Canada) Tony Burgess | (United States) Dyson Racing Team | | | | | 13 | | 15 | | | 17 | 45 |
| 7 | (United Kingdom) Johnny Mowlem | (United States) Dyson Racing Team | | | 18 | | | | | | 18 | | 36 |
| 8 | (France) Romain Dumas | (United States) Muscle Milk Pickett Racing | | | | | | | | | | 20 | 20 |
| 8 | (France) Simon Pagenaud | (United States) Muscle Milk Pickett Racing | 20 | | | | | | | | | | 20 |
| 9 | (South Africa) Mark Patterson | (United States) Dyson Racing Team | | | | | | | | | 0 | 17 | 17 |
| 9 | (United States) Chris McMurry | (United States) Dyson Racing Team | | | | | | | | | | 17 | 17 |

| Colour | Result |
|---|---|
| Gold | Winner |
| Silver | Second place |
| Bronze | Third place |
| Green | Points classification |
| Blue | Non-points classification |
| Blue | Non-classified finish (NC) |
| Purple | Retired, not classified (Ret) |
| Red | Did not qualify (DNQ) |
| Red | Did not pre-qualify (DNPQ) |
| Black | Disqualified (DSQ) |
| White | Did not start (DNS) |
| White | Withdrew (WD) |
| White | Race cancelled (C) |
| Blank | Did not practice (DNP) |
| Blank | Did not arrive (DNA) |
| Blank | Excluded (EX) |

**Bold** - Pole position
Italics - Fastest lap

==== P2 standings ====
| Pos | Driver | Team | SEB | LBH | LGA | LRP | MOS | MOH | RAM | BGP | VIR | PLM | Total |
|---|---|---|---|---|---|---|---|---|---|---|---|---|---|
| 1 | (France) Christophe Bouchut | (United States) Level 5 Motorsports | 24 | 20 | 15 | 20 | 16 | 20 | 15 | 20 | 22 | 24 | 196 |
| 1 | (United States) Scott Tucker | (United States) Level 5 Motorsports | 24 | 20 | 15 | 20 | 16 | 20 | 15 | 20 | 22 | 24 | 196 |
| 2 | (United Kingdom) Martin Plowman | (United States) Conquest Endurance | 17 | 16 | 18 | 16 | 20 | 16 | 22 | 13 | 18 | 0 | 156 |
| 2 | (Denmark) David Heinemeier Hansson | (United States) Conquest Endurance | 17 | 16 | 18 | 16 | 20 | 16 | 22 | 13 | 18 | 0 | 156 |
| 3 | (United States) Patrick Dempsey | (United States) Dempsey Racing | | | 12 | 13 | | 10 | 18 | | | 0 | 53 |
| 4 | (Mexico) Luis Díaz | (United States) Level 5 Motorsports | 0 | 13 | 22 | | | | 0 | 16 | 0 | 0 | 51 |
| 5 | (United States) Joe Foster | (United States) Dempsey Racing | | | 0 | 13 | | 0 | 18 | | | 0 | 31 |
| 6 | (Mexico) Ricardo González | (United States) Level 5 Motorsports | | | | | | 13 | | 16 | 0 | | 29 |
| 7 | (Portugal) João Barbosa | (United States) Level 5 Motorsports | 24 | | | | | | | | | | 24 |
| 8 | (United States) Tim Pappas | (United States) Black Swan Racing | 20 | 0 | | | | | | | | | 20 |
| 8 | (United States) Jon Fogarty | (United States) Black Swan Racing | 20 | | | | | | | | | | 20 |
| 8 | (United Kingdom) Marino Franchitti | (United States) Level 5 Motorsports | | | | | | | | | | 20 | 20 |
| 8 | (United Kingdom) Dario Franchitti | (United States) Level 5 Motorsports | | | | | | | | | | 20 | 20 |
| 9 | (United Kingdom) Jonny Cocker | (United States) Dempsey Racing | | | 12 | | | | | | | | 12 |

==== PC standings ====
Drivers in the PC category are allowed to drive for more than one car during an event. If a driver is in each car for a minimum of two hours each, he is allowed to score the points from whichever car he chooses.

| Pos | Driver | Team | SEB | LBH | LGA | LRP | MOS | MOH | RAM | BGP | VIR | PLM | Total |
|---|---|---|---|---|---|---|---|---|---|---|---|---|---|
| 1 | (Venezuela) Alex Popow | (United States) CORE Autosport | 24 | 20 | 15 | 16 | 13 | 16 | 22 | 20 | 15 | 24 | 185 |
| 2 | (United States) Jon Bennett | (United States) CORE Autosport | 17 | 13 | 22 | 20 | 16 | 8 | 18 | 0 | 22 | 14 | 150 |
| 2 | (United States) Colin Braun | (United States) CORE Autosport | 17 | 13 | 22 | 20 | 16 | 8 | 18 | 0 | 22 | 14 | 150 |
| 3 | (Brazil) Bruno Junqueira | (United States) RSR Racing | 8 | 4 | 18 | 8 | 20 | 0 | 12 | 16 | 12 | 20 | 118 |
| 4 | (Mexico) Rudy Junco Jr. | (United States) PR1/Mathiasen Motorsports | 20 | 6 | | | | 20 | 0 | | 18 | 17 | 81 |
| 5 | (United States) Duncan Ende | (United States) Dempsey Racing | 0 | 8 | 6 | 13 | 10 | 0 | 10 | 13 | 10 | 10 | 80 |
| 5 | (France) Henri Richard | (United States) Dempsey Racing | 0 | 8 | 6 | 13 | 0 | 10 | 10 | 13 | 10 | 10 | 80 |
| 6 | (United Kingdom) Tom Kimber-Smith | (United States) CORE Autosport | | | 15 | 16 | | | 22 | | 15 | | 68 |
| 7 | (United Kingdom) Ryan Dalziel | (United States) CORE Autosport | | 20 | | | 0 | 0 | | 20 | | 24 | 64 |
| 8 | (United States) Ken Dobson | (United States) PR1/Mathiasen Motorsports | 20 | | 8 | 10 | 0 | | | | | 17 | 55 |
| 9 | (Canada) Kyle Marcelli | (United States) Merchant Services Racing | 0 | 10 | 10 | 0 | 8 | 13 | 0 | 0 | 0 | 12 | 53 |
| 10 | (United States) Tomy Drissi | (United States) RSR Racing | 0 | 0 | 0 | 0 | 20 | 0 | | 16 | 12 | 0 | 48 |
| 11 | (United States) Butch Leitzinger | (United States) PR1/Mathiasen Motorsports | 20 | 6 | 8 | 10 | | | | | | | 44 |
| 12 | (United States) Mike Guasch | (United States) Muscle Milk Pickett Racing | 12 | 16 | 12 | | | | | | | | 40 |
| 12 | (United States) Memo Gidley | (United States) Muscle Milk Pickett Racing | 12 | 16 | 12 | | | | | | | | 40 |
| 13 | (Mexico) Roberto González | (United States) RSR Racing | 8 | | 18 | | | | 12 | | | | 38 |
| 14 | (Puerto Rico) Ricardo Vera | (United States) Performance Tech Motorsports (United States) RSR Racing | 10 | | 5 | | | | | | | 20 | 35 |
| 15 | (United States) Antonio Downs | (United States) Merchant Services Racing | | 10 | 0 | 0 | | 13 | 8 | | | | 31 |
| 16 | (United States) Matt Downs | (United States) Merchant Services Racing | | | | | 8 | | 0 | 10 | | 12 | 30 |
| 17 | (Venezuela) E. J. Viso | (United States) CORE Autosport | 24 | | | | | | | | | | 24 |
| 18 | (Mexico) Pablo Sanchez | (United States) Merchant Services Racing | 14 | | | | | | | | 8 | | 22 |
| 19 | (United States) Lucas Downs | (United States) Merchant Services Racing | 0 | | 10 | | | | 0 | 10 | 0 | | 20 |
| 20 | (United Kingdom) Marino Franchitti | (United States) PR1/Mathiasen Motorsports | | | | | 0 | 0 | 0 | | 18 | | 18 |
| 21 | (United States) Elton Julian | (United States) PR1/Mathiasen Motorsports | | | | | | | | | | 17 | 17 |
| 22 | (United Kingdom) Ryan Lewis | (United States) Dempsey Racing | | | 6 | | | | | | | 10 | 16 |
| 23 | (United States) Chapman Ducote | (United States) Merchant Services Racing | 0 | | 0 | | | | 15 | | | 0 | 15 |
| 23 | (United States) James French | (United States) Merchant Services Racing | | | | | | | 15 | | | | 15 |
| 24 | (United States) Anthony Nicolosi | (United States) Performance Tech Motorsports | 10 | | 5 | | | | | | | | 15 |
| 25 | (Mexico) Javier Echeverria | (United States) Merchant Services Racing | 14 | | | | | | | | | | 14 |
| 25 | (Mexico) Ricardo González | (United States) CORE Autosport | | | | | | | | | | 14 | 14 |
| 26 | (Canada) Tony Burgess | (United States) Merchant Services Racing | | 0 | 0 | | | 6 | | 0 | 8 | | 14 |
| 27 | (United Kingdom) Archie Hamilton | (United States) Muscle Milk Pickett Racing | | | 12 | | | | | | | | 12 |
| 28 | (Brazil) Raphael Matos | (United States) Performance Tech Motorsports | 10 | | | | | | | | | | 10 |
| 29 | (Australia) James Kovacic | (United States) Merchant Services Racing | | 0 | | | | 6 | | | | | 6 |

==== GT standings ====
| Pos | Driver | Team | SEB | LBH | LGA | LRP | MOS | MOH | RAM | BGP | VIR | PLM | Total |
|---|---|---|---|---|---|---|---|---|---|---|---|---|---|
| 1 | (United Kingdom) Oliver Gavin | (United States) Corvette Racing | 17 | 20 | 22 | 13 | 1 | 20 | 15 | 16 | 22 | 0 | 146 |
| 1 | (United States) Tommy Milner | (United States) Corvette Racing | 17 | 20 | 22 | 13 | 1 | 20 | 15 | 16 | 22 | 0 | 146 |
| 2 | (United States) Scott Sharp | (United States) Extreme Speed Motorsports | 6 | 13 | 10 | 10 | 20 | 6 | 6 | 13 | 15 | 24 | 123 |
| 2 | (United States) Johannes van Overbeek | (United States) Extreme Speed Motorsports | 6 | 13 | 10 | 10 | 20 | 6 | 6 | 13 | 15 | 24 | 123 |
| 3 | (Denmark) Jan Magnussen | (United States) Corvette Racing | 20 | 10 | 18 | 16 | 16 | 0 | 10 | 6 | 5 | 20 | 121 |
| 3 | (Spain) Antonio García | (United States) Corvette Racing | 20 | 10 | 18 | 16 | 16 | 0 | 10 | 6 | 5 | 20 | 121 |
| 4 | (Germany) Dirk Müller | (United States) BMW Team RLL | 24 | 16 | 12 | 8 | 13 | 8 | 3 | 10 | 4 | 14 | 112 |
| 5 | (Germany) Jörg Bergmeister | (United States) Flying Lizard Motorsports | 5 | 6 | 8 | 20 | 0 | 16 | 18 | 8 | 18 | 12 | 111 |
| 5 | (United States) Patrick Long | (United States) Flying Lizard Motorsports | 5 | 6 | 8 | 20 | 0 | 16 | 18 | 8 | 18 | 12 | 111 |
| 6 | (Germany) Jörg Müller | (United States) BMW Team RLL | 14 | 1 | 15 | 6 | 4 | 13 | 22 | 3 | 12 | 17 | 107 |
| 6 | (United States) Bill Auberlen | (United States) BMW Team RLL | 14 | 1 | 15 | 6 | 4 | 13 | 22 | 3 | 12 | 17 | 107 |
| 7 | (United States) Joey Hand | (United States) BMW Team RLL | 24 | 16 | 12 | 8 | 13 | 8 | | 10 | | | 91 |
| 8 | (Germany) Wolf Henzler | (United States) Team Falken Tire | 7 | 8 | 6 | 4 | 10 | 10 | 0 | 20 | 6 | 10 | 81 |
| 8 | (United States) Bryan Sellers | (United States) Team Falken Tire | 7 | 8 | 6 | 4 | 10 | 10 | 0 | 20 | 6 | 10 | 81 |
| 9 | (United States) Bryce Miller | (United States) Paul Miller Racing | 12 | 4 | 4 | 3 | 8 | 2 | 12 | 2 | 3 | 5 | 55 |
| 9 | (Germany) Sascha Maassen | (United States) Paul Miller Racing | 12 | 4 | 4 | 3 | 8 | 2 | 12 | 2 | 3 | 5 | 55 |
| 10 | (United States) Seth Neiman | (United States) Flying Lizard Motorsports | 10 | 3 | 5 | 2 | 6 | 4 | 5 | 0 | 10 | 8 | 53 |
| 11 | (Germany) Marco Holzer | (United States) Flying Lizard Motorsports | 5 | 3 | 5 | 2 | | 4 | 5 | 4 | 10 | 8 | 46 |
| 12 | (United States) Jonathan Summerton | (United States) BMW Team RLL | 24 | | | | | | 3 | | 4 | 14 | 45 |
| 13 | (Germany) Uwe Alzen | (United States) BMW Team RLL | 14 | | | | | | | | | 14 | 28 |
| 14 | (Finland) Toni Vilander | (United States) Extreme Speed Motorsports | | | | | | | | | | 24 | 24 |
| 15 | (United States) Ed Brown | (United States) Extreme Speed Motorsports | 8 | 2 | 3 | 0 | 2 | 3 | 0 | 0 | 0 | 6 | 24 |
| 16 | (United States) Guy Cosmo | (United States) Extreme Speed Motorsports | 6 | 2 | 3 | 0 | 2 | 3 | 0 | 0 | 0 | 6 | 22 |
| 17 | (United States) Townsend Bell | (United States) Lotus / Alex Job Racing | | 0 | 0 | 1 | 3 | 0 | 8 | 1 | 8 | 0 | 21 |
| 17 | (United States) Bill Sweedler | (United States) Lotus / Alex Job Racing | | 0 | 0 | 1 | 3 | 0 | 8 | 1 | 8 | 0 | 21 |
| 18 | (United States) Jordan Taylor | (United States) Corvette Racing | 20 | | | | | | | | | 0 | 20 |
| 19 | (United Kingdom) Richard Westbrook | (United States) Corvette Racing | 17 | | | | | | | | | 0 | 17 |
| 20 | (Austria) Martin Ragginger | (United States) Team Falken Tire | 7 | | | | | | | | | 10 | 17 |
| 21 | (United States) Andy Lally | (United States) Flying Lizard Motorsports | 10 | | | | 6 | | | | | | 16 |
| 22 | (United States) Anthony Lazzaro | (United States) Extreme Speed Motorsports | 8 | | | | | | 0 | | | 6 | 14 |
| 23 | (France) Patrick Pilet | (United States) Flying Lizard Motorsports | | | | | | | | | | 12 | 12 |
| 23 | (United Kingdom) Rob Bell | (United States) Paul Miller Racing | 12 | | | | | | | | | | 12 |
| 24 | (Germany) Dominik Farnbacher | (United States) SRT Motorsports | | | | | | 1 | 4 | | | 7 | 12 |
| 25 | (United States) Darren Law | (United States) Flying Lizard Motorsports | 10 | | | | | | | | | | 10 |
| 26 | (United Kingdom) Nick Tandy | (United States) Flying Lizard Motorsports | | | | | | | | | | 8 | 8 |
| 26 | (United States) Jeff Segal | (United States) Extreme Speed Motorsports | 8 | | | | | | | | | | 8 |
| 27 | (United States) Ryan Hunter-Reay | (United States) SRT Motorsports | | | | | | | | | | 7 | 7 |
| 28 | (Canada) Kuno Wittmer | (United States) SRT Motorsports | | | | | | 1 | 4 | | | 0 | 5 |
| 29 | (Austria) Richard Lietz | (United States) Paul Miller Racing | | | 0 | | | | | | | 5 | 5 |

==== GTC standings ====
| Pos | Driver | Team | SEB | LBH | LGA | LRP | MOS | MOH | RAM | BGP | VIR | PLM | Total |
|---|---|---|---|---|---|---|---|---|---|---|---|---|---|
| 1 | (United States) Cooper MacNeil | (United States) Alex Job Racing | 20 | 16 | 12 | 20 | 16 | 13 | 22 | 20 | 22 | 0 | 161 |
| 2 | (United States) Leh Keen | (United States) Alex Job Racing | 20 | 16 | | 20 | 16 | 13 | | 20 | 22 | 14 | 141 |
| 3 | (United States) Spencer Pumpelly | (United States) TRG | 14 | 8 | | 6 | 20 | 20 | 5 | 13 | 10 | 20 | 116 |
| 4 | (United States) Peter LeSaffre | (United States) Green Hornet Racing | 17 | 20 | 10 | 16 | 0 | 10 | 15 | 16 | 12 | 0 | 116 |
| 4 | (Republic of Ireland) Damien Faulkner | (United States) Green Hornet Racing | 17 | 20 | 10 | 16 | 0 | 10 | 15 | 16 | 12 | 0 | 116 |
| 5 | (Canada) Chris Cumming | (United States) JDX Racing | 12 | 13 | 0 | 10 | 13 | | 18 | 10 | 15 | 17 | 108 |
| 6 | (Canada) Michael Valiante | (United States) JDX Racing | | 13 | | 10 | 13 | | | 0 | 15 | 17 | 68 |
| 7 | (United States) Bob Faieta | (United States) Competition Motorsports (United States) Green Hornet Racing | 10 | 6 | 15 | | | 16 | 12 | | 6 | 0 | 65 |
| 8 | (Netherlands) Jeroen Bleekemolen | (United States) TRG (United States) Alex Job Racing (United States) NGT Motorsport | | | 22 | | | 0 | 22 | | 18 | | 62 |
| 9 | (United States) James Sofronas | (United States) GMG Racing | 8 | 10 | 18 | 13 | | | 0 | | | | 49 |
| 10 | (United States) Michael Avenatti | (United States) Competition Motorsports | 10 | 6 | 15 | | | | 12 | | 6 | 0 | 49 |
| 11 | (Venezuela) Emilio Di Guida | (United States) TRG | 0 | 8 | 0 | | 20 | | 5 | | 10 | 0 | 43 |
| 12 | (Venezuela) Henrique Cisneros | (United States) NGT Motorsport | 0 | | | | | | | | 18 | 24 | 42 |
| 13 | (United States) Alex Welch | (United States) GMG Racing | 8 | 10 | 0 | 13 | | | 10 | | | | 41 |
| 14 | (South Africa) Dion von Moltke | (United States) Alex Job Racing | 24 | | | | | | | | | 14 | 38 |
| 15 | (United States) Marc Bunting | (United States) TRG | 14 | | | | | | | 13 | | | 27 |
| 16 | (Venezuela) Angel Benitez Jr. | (United States) NGT Motorsport | 0 | | | | | | 6 | | 8 | 12 | 26 |
| 17 | (United States) Cort Wagner | (United States) Competition Motorsports | 10 | | 15 | | | | | | | | 25 |
| 18 | (Germany) Mario Farnbacher | (United States) NGT Motorsport | | | | | | | | | | 24 | 24 |
| 18 | (Poland) Kuba Giermaziak | (United States) NGT Motorsport | | | | | | | | | | 24 | 24 |
| 19 | (Netherlands) Patrick Huisman | (United States) Green Hornet Racing | | | | | | 16 | 8 | | | | 24 |
| 20 | (United States) Al Carter | (United States) TRG | | | | | | 20 | | | | | 20 |
| 21 | (Venezuela) Nelson Canache Jr. | (United States) TRG | | | | | | | | | | 20 | 20 |
| 22 | (United States) Anthony Lazzaro | (United States) Alex Job Racing | | | 12 | 8 | | | | | | | 20 |
| 23 | (Austria) Martin Ragginger | (United States) JDX Racing | | | 0 | | | | 18 | | | | 18 |
| 24 | (Netherlands) Sebastiaan Bleekemolen | (United States) Green Hornet Racing | 17 | | 0 | | | | | | | | 17 |
| 24 | (United States) Sean Johnston | (United States) JDX Racing | | | | | | | | | | 17 | 17 |
| 25 | (France) Kévin Estre | (United States) JDX Racing | 12 | | | | | | | | | | 12 |
| 25 | (United States) Mark Bullitt | (United States) NGT Motorsport | | | | | | | | | | 12 | 12 |
| 25 | (United States) Jeff Segal | (United States) NGT Motorsport | | | | | | | | | | 12 | 12 |
| 26 | (United States) Brian Wong | (United States) Green Hornet Racing | | | | | | 8 | | | | 0 | 8 |
| 27 | (United States) Rene Villeneuve | (United States) GMG Racing | 8 | | 0 | | | | 0 | | | | 8 |
| 28 | (Denmark) Nicki Thiim | (United States) NGT Motorsport | 7 | | | | | | | | | | 7 |
| 29 | (United States) Mike Piera | (United States) TRG | | | | 6 | | | | | | | 6 |
| 30 | (Venezuela) Angel Benitez Sr. | (United States) NGT Motorsport | 0 | | | | | | 6 | | 0 | | 6 |
| 31 | (United Kingdom) Sean Edwards | (United States) NGT Motorsport | 6 | | | | | | | | | | 6 |
