= Bryce Miller (racing driver) =

American racing driver (born 1982)

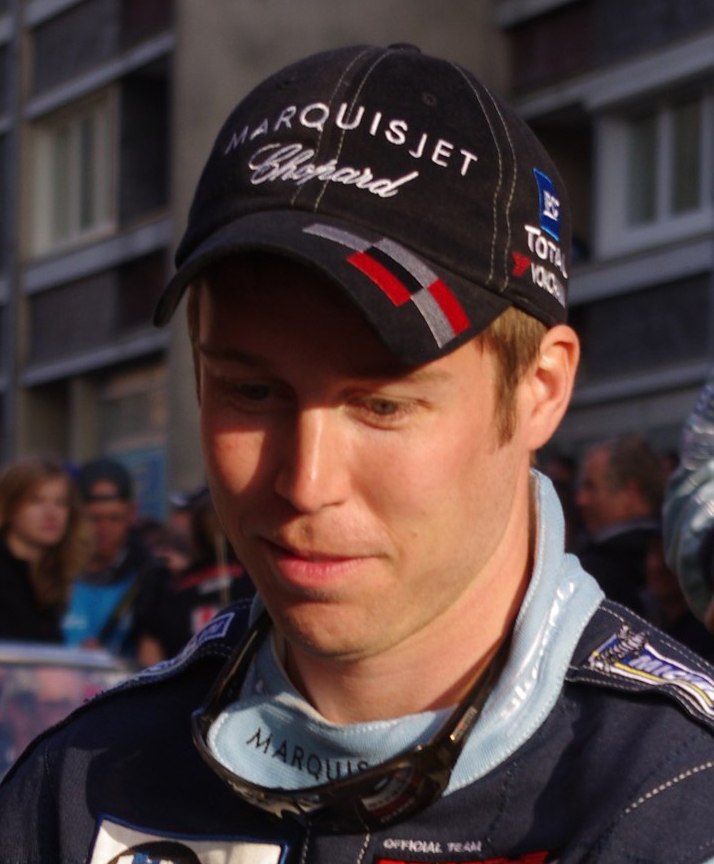
- Miller at the 2011 24 Hours of Le Mans driver parade.
- Nationality: (United States) American
- Born: July 26, 1982 (age 44) Honolulu, Hawaii, U.S.
- Categorisation: FIA Gold (until 2013); FIA Silver (2014–)

Previous series
- 2008–2011 2010–2011 2010 2007–2009 2009 2006–2007 1997: American Le Mans Series; Grand-Am Rolex GT Championship; Le Mans 24 Hours; Grand-Am Rolex Series; FIA GT Championship; IMSA Porsche GT3 Cup; Canadian National Go-Kart

Championship titles
- 2014 2008 2007 1992: Tudor United Sports Championship; American Le Mans Series; NASCAR Rolex Grand-Am Sports; U.S. Grand National Go-Kart Champion, East Coast Regional Go-Kart Champion

Bryce Miller (born July 26, 1982) is an American racing driver from Summit, New Jersey. He currently drives in the IMSA owned Tudor United SportsCar Championship for Paul Miller Racing. Bryce is the son of Paul Miller and nephew of Kenper Miller, both of whom competed in sports car racing. Between them, the three have 75 years of motor racing experience.

== Early life ==
Born in Honolulu, Hawaii, Miller grew up watching his father, Paul Miller and uncle Kenper Miller's professional driving career from the pits. He was influenced by his father and uncle to begin his go-karting career at the age of seven. Miller saw an early success winning over 60 International Karting Federation races which included breaking the track record at his home circuit, Oakland Valley Raceway. He began racing open wheel formula cars professionally when he was 17 years old and after he graduated The University of Vermont, Porsche invited Miller to the UPS Porsche Junior Team shoot-out to compete for a factory seat, this was the point when he decided to compete in sports car racing.

== Career ==
Miller started racing go-karts competitively at the age of seven, and by ten years old he became the U.S. Grand National Karting Champion and East Coast Regional Karting Champion. He moved up to open-wheel formula cars, winning Rookie of the Year honors in the Formula Barber Dodge Championship and was invited to participate in the acclaimed Winfield Scholarship competition, where he finished runner-up to the scholarship winner. His open-wheel formula career spanned from 1999–2003. After Porsche invited him to compete in the Junior Cup shoot-out he decided to pursue sports car racing. In 2007, his debut year on the 13 race Grand-Am Rolex Series circuit, he accumulated 10 podiums, winning at Virginia International Raceway, winning the Team Championship and finishing 3rd in driver points and 2nd in Rookie of the Year points. In 2008, he won the Atlanta America Generac 500. Miller secured a total of 24 podium finishes from 2006 to 2009 racing in the Grand-Am Rolex Series and, American Le Mans Series and IMSA GT3 Cup Challenge. During these years he finished 2nd at the acclaimed Daytona 24 hours both in 2008 and 2011 and finished second in the famed TOTAL 24 Hours of Spa.

Miller teamed with British driver Luke Hines in the American Le Mans Series GTC category. That season he secured a track record at the Salt Lake Grand Prix and qualified on pole at The Mosport Grand-Prix. In June 2010, Miller joined up with JMW Motorsport to compete in the 2010 24 Hours of Le Mans with co-drivers Rob Bell and Tim Sugden. In the 2011 24 Hours of Le Mans, he joined Team Felbermayr-Proton, driving a Porsche 997 GT3-RSR with co-drivers Nick Tandy and Abdulaziz Al-Faisal.

Miller also finished second in both the team and driver championship points of in the 2014 Tudor United SportsCar Championship in an Audi R8 LMS prepared by Paul Miller Racing. In 2014, Miller again competed in the 2015 Tudor United SportsCar Championship with Paul Miller Racing, joining both Christopher Haase and Dion Von Moltke. Miller partnered with full-season co-drivers Christopher Haase and Dion von Moltke in the Rolex 24 At Daytona and 12 Hours of Sebring, moving 2015 off to a fast start with a pair of fifth-place finishes. He more recently scored a podium, third-place finish at Watkins Glen's Sahlen's Six Hours of the Glen.

== Career results ==
=== 24 Hours of Le Mans results ===
Year	Team	Co-Drivers	Car	Class	Laps	Pos.	Class Pos.
2010	(United Kingdom) JMW Motorsport	(United Kingdom) Rob Bell (United Kingdom) Tim Sugden	Aston Martin V8 Vantage GT2	GT2	71	DNF	DNF
2011	(Germany) Team Felbermayr-Proton	(United Kingdom) Nick Tandy (Saudi Arabia) Abdulaziz Al-Faisal	Porsche 997 GT3-RSR	GTE; Pro	169	DNF	DNF

=== American Le Mans Series results ===
Year	Team	Co-Drivers	Car	Class	Laps	Pos.
2008	(United States) Farnbacher-Loles Motorsport	(Germany) Dirk Werner (United Kingdom) Richard Westbrook	Porsche 997 GT3-RSR	GT2	622	18
2009	(United States) Farnbacher-Loles Racing	(Germany) Marc Lieb (Germany) Dirk Werner (Germany) Pierre Ehret (Austria) Richard Lietz (Austria) Martin Ragginger	Porsche 997 GT3-RSR	GT2	172	44
2010	(United States) Orbit Racing	(United States) John McMullen	Porsche 997 GT3-RSR	GTC	714	12
2011	(United States) Paul Miller Racing	(Germany) Sascha Maassen (France) Emmanuel Collard	Porsche 997 GT3-RSR	GT	1424	13
2012	(United States) Paul Miller Racing	(Germany) Sascha Maassen (United Kingdom) Rob Bell (Austria) Richard Lietz	Porsche 997 GT3-RSR	GT	1622	9
2013	(United States) Paul Miller Racing	(Germany) Marco Holzer (Austria) Richard Lietz (France) Emmanuel Collard	Porsche 997 GT3-RSR	GT	1086	19

=== Rolex Sports Car Series ===
Year	Team	Co-Drivers	Car	Class	Laps	Pos.
2007	(United States) Farnbacher Loles Motorsports	(Germany) Dirk Werner	Porsche 997 GT3	GT	1717	1
2008	(United States) The Racer's Group (United States) Farnbacher Loles Motorsports	(Germany) Dirk Werner (United States) Ted Ballou	Porsche 997 GT3	GT	1867	8
2009	(United States) The Racer's Group (United States) Racers Edge Motorsports (United States) Miller Barrett Racing	(United States) John Potter (United States) Craig Stanton (Germany) Marco Holzer	Mazda RX-8	GT	965	2
2010	(United States) Miller Barrett Racing		Porsche 997 GT3	GT	501	43
2011	(United States) Paul Miller Racing		Porsche 997 GT3	GT	684	57
2012	(United States) Paul Miller Racing		Porsche 997 GT3	GT	224	105
2013	(United States) Paul Miller Racing		Porsche 997 GT3	GT	161	105

=== Tudor United SportsCar Championship ===
Year	Team	Co-Drivers	Car	Class	Laps	Pos.
2014	(United States) Paul Miller Racing	(Germany) Christopher Haase	Audi R8 LMS	GTD	376	2
2015	(United States) Paul Miller Racing	(Germany) Christopher Haase (United States) Dion von Moltke	Audi R8 LMS	GTD		15

=== FIA GT Championship ===
Year	Team	Co-Drivers	Car	Class	Laps	Pos.
2009	(Italy) BMS Scuderia Italia	(Germany) Marco Holzer (Austria) Martin Ragginger	Porsche 997 GT3 RSR	GT		2

=== Blancpain GT Series ===
Year	Team	Co-Drivers	Car	Class	Laps	Pos.
2009	(Belgium) Prospeed Competition	(Belgium) Ludovic Sougnez (Netherlands) Paul van Splunteren	Porsche 997 GT3 RSR	GT		DNF
