= 2012 Mid-Ohio Sports Car Challenge =

Sports car race

The layout of Mid-Ohio Sports Car Course

The 2012 Mid-Ohio Sports Car Challenge was a multi-class sports car and GT motor race held at the Mid-Ohio Sports Car Course in Ohio, United States on August 4, 2012. It was the sixth round of the 2012 American Le Mans Series season and the 41st race in the combined history of sportscar races associated with the Mid-Ohio Sports Car Challenge. The race was held over a two-hour-and-45-minute time period, during which 123 laps of the 3.6 kilometre circuit were completed for a race distance of 447 kilometres.

The race was won by the Muscle Milk Pickett Racing team. German drivers Lucas Luhr and Klaus Graf driving a HPD ARX-03a Honda sports car won by over a lap from their season long P1 class rivals, the Dyson Racing Team run Lola B12/60 sports car. It was the fifth consecutive victory for Luhr and Graf. It was Luhr third outright win at Mid-Ohio and Graf's second. The second Dyson Racing Team Lola-Mazda was in third place near the end of the race when the gearbox failed.

Level 5 Motorsports took their fifth win of the season taking a seven second win in their HPD ARX-03b over their season long rivals, the Conquest Endurance team Morgan LMP2. It was Scott Tucker's fifth win of the season and Christophe Bouchut's fourth win.

Fifth was the second Level 5 Motorsports HPD-Honda ahead of the Prototype Challenge class winners, the PR1/Mathiasan Motorsports pair of Rudy Junco and Marino Franchitti in their Oreca FLM09. It was the team's third victory in the Prototype Challenge class adding to wins at Road America and Road Atlanta in 2011.

Eleventh outright was the GT class winners, Corvette Racing pair of Oliver Gavin and Tommy Milner in their Chevrolet Corvette. Gavin had to endure twenty minutes of pressure from Jörg Bergmeister in the Flying Lizard Motorsports. The margin of victory was just 0.2 seconds.

The GT Challenge class winners, Tim Pappas and Jeroen Bleekemolen, claimed JDX Racing's first win of the year. It was Bleekemolen's second win after the year after winning in Monterey in May with TRG. TRG was second in class with new driver Al Carter and Spencer Pumpelly.

29 of the 32 entries were running at races conclusion.

== Race ==
=== Race result ===
Class winners in bold. Cars failing to complete 70% of their class winner's distance are marked as Not Classified (NC).

Pos	Class	No	Team	Drivers	Chassis	Tire	Laps
Pos	Class	No	Team	Drivers	Engine	Tire	Laps
1	**P1**	**6**	**(United States) Muscle Milk Pickett Racing**	**(Germany) Lucas Luhr (Germany) Klaus Graf**	**HPD ARX-03a**	MI	**123**
1	**P1**	**6**	**(United States) Muscle Milk Pickett Racing**	**(Germany) Lucas Luhr (Germany) Klaus Graf**	**Honda 3.4 L V8**	MI	**123**
2	P1	16	(United States) Dyson Racing Team	(United States) Chris Dyson (United Kingdom) Guy Smith	Lola B12/60	D	122
2	P1	16	(United States) Dyson Racing Team	(United States) Chris Dyson (United Kingdom) Guy Smith	Mazda MZR-R 2.0 L Turbo I4 (Isobutanol)	D	122
3	**P2**	**055**	**(United States) Level 5 Motorsports**	**(United States) Scott Tucker (France) Christophe Bouchut**	**HPD ARX-03b**	D	**121**
3	**P2**	**055**	**(United States) Level 5 Motorsports**	**(United States) Scott Tucker (France) Christophe Bouchut**	**Honda HR28TT 2.8 L Turbo V6**	D	**121**
4	P2	37	(United States) Conquest Endurance	(United Kingdom) Martin Plowman (Denmark) David Heinemeier Hansson	Morgan LMP2	D	121
4	P2	37	(United States) Conquest Endurance	(United Kingdom) Martin Plowman (Denmark) David Heinemeier Hansson	Nissan VK45DE 4.5 L V8	D	121
5	P2	95	(United States) Level 5 Motorsports	(United States) Scott Tucker (Mexico) Ricardo González	HPD ARX-03b	D	120
5	P2	95	(United States) Level 5 Motorsports	(United States) Scott Tucker (Mexico) Ricardo González	Honda HR28TT 2.8 L Turbo V6	D	120
6	**PC**	**52**	**(United States) PR1/Mathiasen Motorsports**	**(Mexico) Rudy Junco, Jr. (United Kingdom) Marino Franchitti**	**Oreca FLM09**	MI	**118**
6	**PC**	**52**	**(United States) PR1/Mathiasen Motorsports**	**(Mexico) Rudy Junco, Jr. (United Kingdom) Marino Franchitti**	**Chevrolet LS3 6.2 L V8**	MI	**118**
7	PC	06	(United States) CORE Autosport	(Venezuela) Alex Popow (United Kingdom) Ryan Dalziel	Oreca FLM09	MI	118
7	PC	06	(United States) CORE Autosport	(Venezuela) Alex Popow (United Kingdom) Ryan Dalziel	Chevrolet LS3 6.2 L V8	MI	118
8	PC	8	(United States) Merchant Services Racing	(Canada) Kyle Marcelli (United States) Antonio Downs	Oreca FLM09	MI	116
8	PC	8	(United States) Merchant Services Racing	(Canada) Kyle Marcelli (United States) Antonio Downs	Chevrolet LS3 6.2 L V8	MI	116
9	P2	27	(United States) Dempsey Racing	(United States) Patrick Dempsey (United States) Joe Foster (United States) Dane Cameron	Lola B12/87	MI	116
9	P2	27	(United States) Dempsey Racing	(United States) Patrick Dempsey (United States) Joe Foster (United States) Dane Cameron	Judd-BMW HK 3.6 L V8	MI	116
10	PC	9	(United States) RSR Racing	(Brazil) Bruno Junqueira (United States) Tomy Drissi	Oreca FLM09	MI	115
10	PC	9	(United States) RSR Racing	(Brazil) Bruno Junqueira (United States) Tomy Drissi	Chevrolet LS3 6.2 L V8	MI	115
11	**GT**	**4**	**(United States) Corvette Racing**	**(United Kingdom) Oliver Gavin (United States) Tommy Milner**	**Chevrolet Corvette C6.R**	MI	**115**
11	**GT**	**4**	**(United States) Corvette Racing**	**(United Kingdom) Oliver Gavin (United States) Tommy Milner**	**Chevrolet 5.5 L V8**	MI	**115**
12	GT	45	(United States) Flying Lizard Motorsports	(Germany) Jörg Bergmeister (United States) Patrick Long	Porsche 997 GT3-RSR	MI	115
12	GT	45	(United States) Flying Lizard Motorsports	(Germany) Jörg Bergmeister (United States) Patrick Long	Porsche 4.0 L Flat-6	MI	115
13 DNF	P1	20	(United States) Dyson Racing Team	(United States) Michael Marsal (United States) Eric Lux	Lola B11/66	D	114
13 DNF	P1	20	(United States) Dyson Racing Team	(United States) Michael Marsal (United States) Eric Lux	Mazda MZR-R 2.0 L Turbo I4 (Isobutanol)	D	114
14	GT	55	(United States) BMW Team RLL	(Germany) Jörg Müller (United States) Bill Auberlen	BMW M3 GT2	D	114
14	GT	55	(United States) BMW Team RLL	(Germany) Jörg Müller (United States) Bill Auberlen	BMW 4.0 L V8	D	114
15	PC	25	(United States) Dempsey Racing	(France) Henri Richard (United States) Duncan Ende	Oreca FLM09	MI	114
15	PC	25	(United States) Dempsey Racing	(France) Henri Richard (United States) Duncan Ende	Chevrolet LS3 6.2 L V8	MI	114
16	GT	17	(United States) Team Falken Tire	(Germany) Wolf Henzler (United States) Bryan Sellers	Porsche 997 GT3-RSR	FAL	114
16	GT	17	(United States) Team Falken Tire	(Germany) Wolf Henzler (United States) Bryan Sellers	Porsche 4.0 L Flat-6	FAL	114
17	GT	56	(United States) BMW Team RLL	(United States) Joey Hand (Germany) Dirk Müller	BMW M3 GT2	D	114
17	GT	56	(United States) BMW Team RLL	(United States) Joey Hand (Germany) Dirk Müller	BMW 4.0 L V8	D	114
18	GT	01	(United States) Extreme Speed Motorsports	(United States) Scott Sharp (United States) Johannes van Overbeek	Ferrari 458 Italia GT2	MI	113
18	GT	01	(United States) Extreme Speed Motorsports	(United States) Scott Sharp (United States) Johannes van Overbeek	Ferrari 4.5 L V8	MI	113
19	GT	44	(United States) Flying Lizard Motorsports	(United States) Seth Neiman (Germany) Marco Holzer	Porsche 997 GT3-RSR	MI	113
19	GT	44	(United States) Flying Lizard Motorsports	(United States) Seth Neiman (Germany) Marco Holzer	Porsche 4.0 L Flat-6	MI	113
20	GT	02	(United States) Extreme Speed Motorsports	(United States) Ed Brown (United States) Guy Cosmo	Ferrari 458 Italia GT2	MI	112
20	GT	02	(United States) Extreme Speed Motorsports	(United States) Ed Brown (United States) Guy Cosmo	Ferrari 4.5 L V8	MI	112
21	PC	05	(United States) CORE Autosport	(United States) Jon Bennett (United States) Colin Braun	Oreca FLM09	MI	112
21	PC	05	(United States) CORE Autosport	(United States) Jon Bennett (United States) Colin Braun	Chevrolet LS3 6.2 L V8	MI	112
22	GT	48	(United States) Paul Miller Racing	(United States) Bryce Miller (Germany) Sascha Maassen	Porsche 997 GT3-RSR	D	112
22	GT	48	(United States) Paul Miller Racing	(United States) Bryce Miller (Germany) Sascha Maassen	Porsche 4.0 L Flat-6	D	112
23	GT	91	(United States) SRT Motorsports	(Canada) Kuno Wittmer (Germany) Dominik Farnbacher	SRT Viper GTS-R	MI	111
23	GT	91	(United States) SRT Motorsports	(Canada) Kuno Wittmer (Germany) Dominik Farnbacher	Dodge 8.0 L V10	MI	111
24 DNF	GT	23	(United States) Lotus / Alex Job Racing	(United States) Bill Sweedler (United States) Townsend Bell	Lotus Evora GTE	Y	109
24 DNF	GT	23	(United States) Lotus / Alex Job Racing	(United States) Bill Sweedler (United States) Townsend Bell	Toyota-Cosworth 3.5 L V6	Y	109
25	GT	93	(United States) SRT Motorsports	(Belgium) Marc Goossens (United States) Tommy Kendall	SRT Viper GTS-R	MI	109
25	GT	93	(United States) SRT Motorsports	(Belgium) Marc Goossens (United States) Tommy Kendall	Dodge 8.0 L V10	MI	109
26	**GTC**	**11**	**(United States) JDX Racing**	**(United States) Tim Pappas (Netherlands) Jeroen Bleekemolen**	**Porsche 997 GT3 Cup**	Y	**108**
26	**GTC**	**11**	**(United States) JDX Racing**	**(United States) Tim Pappas (Netherlands) Jeroen Bleekemolen**	**Porsche 4.0 L Flat-6**	Y	**108**
27	GTC	66	(United States) TRG	(United States) Al Carter (United States) Spencer Pumpelly	Porsche 997 GT3 Cup	Y	107
27	GTC	66	(United States) TRG	(United States) Al Carter (United States) Spencer Pumpelly	Porsche 4.0 L Flat-6	Y	107
28	GTC	33	(United States) Green Hornet Racing	(United States) Bob Faieta (Netherlands) Patrick Huisman	Porsche 997 GT3 Cup	Y	107
28	GTC	33	(United States) Green Hornet Racing	(United States) Bob Faieta (Netherlands) Patrick Huisman	Porsche 4.0 L Flat-6	Y	107
29	GTC	22	(United States) Alex Job Racing	(United States) Cooper MacNeil (United States) Leh Keen	Porsche 997 GT3 Cup	Y	107
29	GTC	22	(United States) Alex Job Racing	(United States) Cooper MacNeil (United States) Leh Keen	Porsche 4.0 L Flat-6	Y	107
30	GTC	34	(United States) Green Hornet Racing	(United States) Peter LeSaffre (Republic of Ireland) Damien Faulkner	Porsche 997 GT3 Cup	Y	106
30	GTC	34	(United States) Green Hornet Racing	(United States) Peter LeSaffre (Republic of Ireland) Damien Faulkner	Porsche 4.0 L Flat-6	Y	106
31	GT	3	(United States) Corvette Racing	(Denmark) Jan Magnussen (Spain) Antonio García	Chevrolet Corvette C6.R	MI	105
31	GT	3	(United States) Corvette Racing	(Denmark) Jan Magnussen (Spain) Antonio García	Chevrolet 5.5 L V8	MI	105
32 DNF	PC	7	(United States) Merchant Services Racing	(Canada) Tony Burgess (Australia) James Kovacic	Oreca FLM09	MI	88
32 DNF	PC	7	(United States) Merchant Services Racing	(Canada) Tony Burgess (Australia) James Kovacic	Chevrolet LS3 6.2 L V8	MI	88

American Le Mans Series
Previous race: Grand Prix of Mosport	2012 season	Next race: Road Race Showcase
