= 2012 American Le Mans Series at Long Beach =

Long Beach Street Circuit

The 2012 Tequila Patrón American Le Mans Series at Long Beach was held at Long Beach Street Circuit on April 14, 2012. It was the second round of the 2012 American Le Mans Series season.

== Qualifying ==
Due to heavy rain before the qualifying session was scheduled to take place, the ALMS decided to postpone the qualifying session. Grid position was decided by points standings in the championship which meant the No. 16 Dyson Racing car started on pole position.

=== Qualifying results ===
Pole position winners in each class are marked in bold.

Pos	Class	Team	Grid
1	**P1**	**#16 Dyson Racing Team**	**1**
2	P1	#6 Muscle Milk Pickett Racing	2
3	P1	#20 Dyson Racing Team	3
4	**P2**	**#055 Level 5 Motorsports**	**4**
5	P2	#54 Black Swan Racing	5
6	P2	#37 Conquest Endurance	6
7	P2	#95 Level 5 Motorsports	7
8	**PC**	**#06 CORE Autosport**	**8**
9	PC	#52 PR1/Mathiasen Motorsports	9
10	PC	#05 CORE Autosport	10
11	PC	#5 Muscle Milk Pickett Racing	11
12	PC	#9 RSR Racing	12
13	PC	#25 Dempsey Racing	13
14	PC	#8 Merchant Services Racing	14
15	PC	#7 Merchant Services Racing	15
16	**GT**	**#56 BMW Team RLL**	**16**
17	GT	#3 Corvette Racing	17
18	GT	#4 Corvette Racing	18
19	GT	#55 BMW Team RLL	19
20	GT	#48 Paul Miller Racing	20
21	GT	#44 Flying Lizard Motorsports	21
22	GT	#02 Extreme Speed Motorsports	22
23	GT	#17 Team Falken Tire	23
24	GT	#01 Extreme Speed Motorsports	24
25	GT	#45 Flying Lizard Motorsports	25
26	GT	#23 Lotus / Alex Job Racing	26
27	GT	#007 Aston Martin Racing	27
28	**GTC**	**#34 Green Hornet Racing**	**28**
29	GTC	#22 Alex Job Racing	29
30	GTC	#66 TRG	30
31	GTC	#11 JDX Racing	31
32	GTC	#24 Competition Motorsports	32
33	GTC	#32 GMG Racing	33

== Race ==
=== Race result ===
Class winners in bold. Cars failing to complete 70% of their class winner's distance are marked as Not Classified (NC).

Pos	Class	No	Team	Drivers	Chassis	Tire	Laps
Pos	Class	No	Team	Drivers	Engine	Tire	Laps
1	**P1**	**6**	**(United States) Muscle Milk Pickett Racing**	**(Germany) Klaus Graf (Germany) Lucas Luhr**	**HPD ARX-03a**	M	**86**
1	**P1**	**6**	**(United States) Muscle Milk Pickett Racing**	**(Germany) Klaus Graf (Germany) Lucas Luhr**	**Honda 3.4 L V8**	M	**86**
2	P1	16	(United States) Dyson Racing Team	(United States) Chris Dyson (United Kingdom) Guy Smith	Lola B12/60	D	86
2	P1	16	(United States) Dyson Racing Team	(United States) Chris Dyson (United Kingdom) Guy Smith	Mazda MZR-R 2.0 L Turbo I4 (Isobutanol)	D	86
3	**PC**	**06**	**(United States) CORE Autosport**	**(Venezuela) Alex Popow (United Kingdom) Ryan Dalziel**	**Oreca FLM09**	M	**85**
3	**PC**	**06**	**(United States) CORE Autosport**	**(Venezuela) Alex Popow (United Kingdom) Ryan Dalziel**	**Chevrolet LS3 6.2 L V8**	M	**85**
4	PC	5	(United States) Muscle Milk Pickett Racing	(Mexico) Memo Gidley (United States) Michael Guasch	Oreca FLM09	M	84
4	PC	5	(United States) Muscle Milk Pickett Racing	(Mexico) Memo Gidley (United States) Michael Guasch	Chevrolet LS3 6.2 L V8	M	84
5	PC	05	(United States) CORE Autosport	(United States) Colin Braun (United States) Jon Bennett	Oreca FLM09	M	84
5	PC	05	(United States) CORE Autosport	(United States) Colin Braun (United States) Jon Bennett	Chevrolet LS3 6.2 L V8	M	84
6	**GT**	**4**	**(United States) Corvette Racing**	**(United Kingdom) Oliver Gavin (United States) Tommy Milner**	**Chevrolet Corvette C6.R**	M	**84**
6	**GT**	**4**	**(United States) Corvette Racing**	**(United Kingdom) Oliver Gavin (United States) Tommy Milner**	**Chevrolet 5.5 L V8**	M	**84**
7	GT	56	(United States) BMW Team RLL	(Germany) Dirk Müller (United States) Joey Hand	BMW M3 GT2	D	84
7	GT	56	(United States) BMW Team RLL	(Germany) Dirk Müller (United States) Joey Hand	BMW 4.0 L V8	D	84
8	GT	01	(United States) Extreme Speed Motorsports	(United States) Scott Sharp (United States) Johannes van Overbeek	Ferrari 458 Italia GT2	M	84
8	GT	01	(United States) Extreme Speed Motorsports	(United States) Scott Sharp (United States) Johannes van Overbeek	Ferrari 4.5 L V8	M	84
9	GT	3	(United States) Corvette Racing	(Denmark) Jan Magnussen (Spain) Antonio García	Chevrolet Corvette C6.R	M	84
9	GT	3	(United States) Corvette Racing	(Denmark) Jan Magnussen (Spain) Antonio García	Chevrolet 5.5 L V8	M	84
10	**P2**	**055**	**(United States) Level 5 Motorsports**	**(United States) Scott Tucker (France) Christophe Bouchut**	**HPD ARX-03b**	D	**83**
10	**P2**	**055**	**(United States) Level 5 Motorsports**	**(United States) Scott Tucker (France) Christophe Bouchut**	**Honda HR28TT 2.8 L Turbo V6**	D	**83**
11	GT	007	(United Kingdom) Aston Martin Racing	(United Kingdom) Darren Turner (Mexico) Adrián Fernández	Aston Martin Vantage GTE	M	83
11	GT	007	(United Kingdom) Aston Martin Racing	(United Kingdom) Darren Turner (Mexico) Adrián Fernández	Aston Martin 4.5 L V8	M	83
12	GT	17	(United States) Team Falken Tire	(United States) Bryan Sellers (Germany) Wolf Henzler	Porsche 997 GT3-RSR	F	83
12	GT	17	(United States) Team Falken Tire	(United States) Bryan Sellers (Germany) Wolf Henzler	Porsche 4.0 L Flat-6	F	83
13	GT	45	(United States) Flying Lizard Motorsports	(United States) Patrick Long (Germany) Jörg Bergmeister	Porsche 997 GT3-RSR	M	83
13	GT	45	(United States) Flying Lizard Motorsports	(United States) Patrick Long (Germany) Jörg Bergmeister	Porsche 4.0 L Flat-6	M	83
14	GT	48	(United States) Paul Miller Racing	(United States) Bryce Miller (Germany) Sascha Maassen	Porsche 997 GT3-RSR	D	83
14	GT	48	(United States) Paul Miller Racing	(United States) Bryce Miller (Germany) Sascha Maassen	Porsche 4.0 L Flat-6	D	83
15	P1	20	(United States) Dyson Racing Team	(United States) Eric Lux (United States) Michael Marsal	Lola B11/66	D	83
15	P1	20	(United States) Dyson Racing Team	(United States) Eric Lux (United States) Michael Marsal	Mazda MZR-R 2.0 L Turbo I4 (Isobutanol)	D	83
16	PC	8	(United States) Merchant Services Racing	(Canada) Kyle Marcelli (United States) Antonio Downs	Oreca FLM09	M	83
16	PC	8	(United States) Merchant Services Racing	(Canada) Kyle Marcelli (United States) Antonio Downs	Chevrolet LS3 6.2 L V8	M	83
17	P2	37	(United States) Conquest Endurance	(United Kingdom) Martin Plowman (Denmark) David Heinemeier Hansson	Morgan LMP2	D	83
17	P2	37	(United States) Conquest Endurance	(United Kingdom) Martin Plowman (Denmark) David Heinemeier Hansson	Nissan VK45DE 4.5 L V8	D	83
18	PC	25	(United States) Dempsey Racing	(United States) Duncan Ende (France) Henri Richard	Oreca FLM09	M	82
18	PC	25	(United States) Dempsey Racing	(United States) Duncan Ende (France) Henri Richard	Chevrolet LS3 6.2 L V8	M	82
19	P2	95	(United States) Level 5 Motorsports	(United States) Scott Tucker (Mexico) Luis Díaz	HPD ARX-03b	D	81
19	P2	95	(United States) Level 5 Motorsports	(United States) Scott Tucker (Mexico) Luis Díaz	Honda HR28TT 2.8 L Turbo V6	D	81
20	GT	44	(United States) Flying Lizard Motorsports	(United States) Seth Neiman (Germany) Marco Holzer	Porsche 997 GT3-RSR	M	81
20	GT	44	(United States) Flying Lizard Motorsports	(United States) Seth Neiman (Germany) Marco Holzer	Porsche 4.0 L Flat-6	M	81
21	GT	02	(United States) Extreme Speed Motorsports	(United States) Ed Brown (United States) Guy Cosmo	Ferrari 458 Italia GT2	M	80
21	GT	02	(United States) Extreme Speed Motorsports	(United States) Ed Brown (United States) Guy Cosmo	Ferrari 4.5 L V8	M	80
22	PC	52	(United States) PR1/Mathiasen Motorsports	(United States) Butch Leitzinger (Mexico) Rudy Junco, Jr.	Oreca FLM09	M	80
22	PC	52	(United States) PR1/Mathiasen Motorsports	(United States) Butch Leitzinger (Mexico) Rudy Junco, Jr.	Chevrolet LS3 6.2 L V8	M	80
23	**GTC**	**34**	**(United States) Green Hornet Racing**	**(United States) Peter LeSaffre (Republic of Ireland) Damien Faulkner**	**Porsche 997 GT3 Cup**	Y	**79**
23	**GTC**	**34**	**(United States) Green Hornet Racing**	**(United States) Peter LeSaffre (Republic of Ireland) Damien Faulkner**	**Porsche 3.8 L Flat-6**	Y	**79**
24	GTC	22	(United States) Alex Job Racing	(United States) Leh Keen (United States) Cooper MacNeil	Porsche 997 GT3 Cup	Y	79
24	GTC	22	(United States) Alex Job Racing	(United States) Leh Keen (United States) Cooper MacNeil	Porsche 3.8 L Flat-6	Y	79
25	GTC	11	(United States) JDX Racing	(Canada) Chris Cumming (Canada) Michael Valiante	Porsche 997 GT3 Cup	Y	79
25	GTC	11	(United States) JDX Racing	(Canada) Chris Cumming (Canada) Michael Valiante	Porsche 3.8 L Flat-6	Y	79
26	GTC	32	(United States) GMG Racing	(United States) James Sofronas (United States) Alex Welch	Porsche 997 GT3 Cup	Y	79
26	GTC	32	(United States) GMG Racing	(United States) James Sofronas (United States) Alex Welch	Porsche 3.8 L Flat-6	Y	79
27	GTC	66	(United States) TRG	(United States) Spencer Pumpelly (Venezuela) Emilio Di Guida	Porsche 997 GT3 Cup	Y	77
27	GTC	66	(United States) TRG	(United States) Spencer Pumpelly (Venezuela) Emilio Di Guida	Porsche 3.8 L Flat-6	Y	77
28	GT	55	(United States) BMW Team RLL	(United States) Bill Auberlen (Germany) Jörg Müller	BMW M3 GT2	D	71
28	GT	55	(United States) BMW Team RLL	(United States) Bill Auberlen (Germany) Jörg Müller	BMW 4.0 L V8	D	71
29	PC	9	(United States) RSR Racing	(Brazil) Bruno Junqueira (United States) Tomy Drissi	Oreca FLM09	M	69
29	PC	9	(United States) RSR Racing	(Brazil) Bruno Junqueira (United States) Tomy Drissi	Chevrolet LS3 6.2 L V8	M	69
30 NC	GT	23	(United States) Lotus Alex Job Racing	(United States) Townsend Bell (United States) Bill Sweedler	Lotus Evora GTE	Y	57
30 NC	GT	23	(United States) Lotus Alex Job Racing	(United States) Townsend Bell (United States) Bill Sweedler	Toyota-Cosworth 3.5 L V6	Y	57
31 DNF	GTC	24	(United States) Competition Motorsports	(United States) Bob Faieta (United States) Michael Avenatti	Porsche 997 GT3 Cup	Y	74
31 DNF	GTC	24	(United States) Competition Motorsports	(United States) Bob Faieta (United States) Michael Avenatti	Porsche 3.8 L Flat-6	Y	74
32 DNF	PC	7	(United States) Merchant Services Racing	(Australia) James Kovacic (Canada) Tony Burgess	Oreca FLM09	M	35
32 DNF	PC	7	(United States) Merchant Services Racing	(Australia) James Kovacic (Canada) Tony Burgess	Chevrolet LS3 6.2 L V8	M	35
33 DNF	P2	54	(United States) Black Swan Racing	(United States) Tim Pappas (Netherlands) Jeroen Bleekemolen	Lola B11/80	D	1
33 DNF	P2	54	(United States) Black Swan Racing	(United States) Tim Pappas (Netherlands) Jeroen Bleekemolen	Honda HR28TT 2.8 L Turbo V6	D	1

== See also ==
- 2012 Toyota Grand Prix of Long Beach

American Le Mans Series
Previous race: 12 Hours of Sebring	2012 season	Next race: American Le Mans Monterey
