= HPD ARX-03 =

Race car prototype

HPD ARX-03a/b/c Acura ARX-03a/b
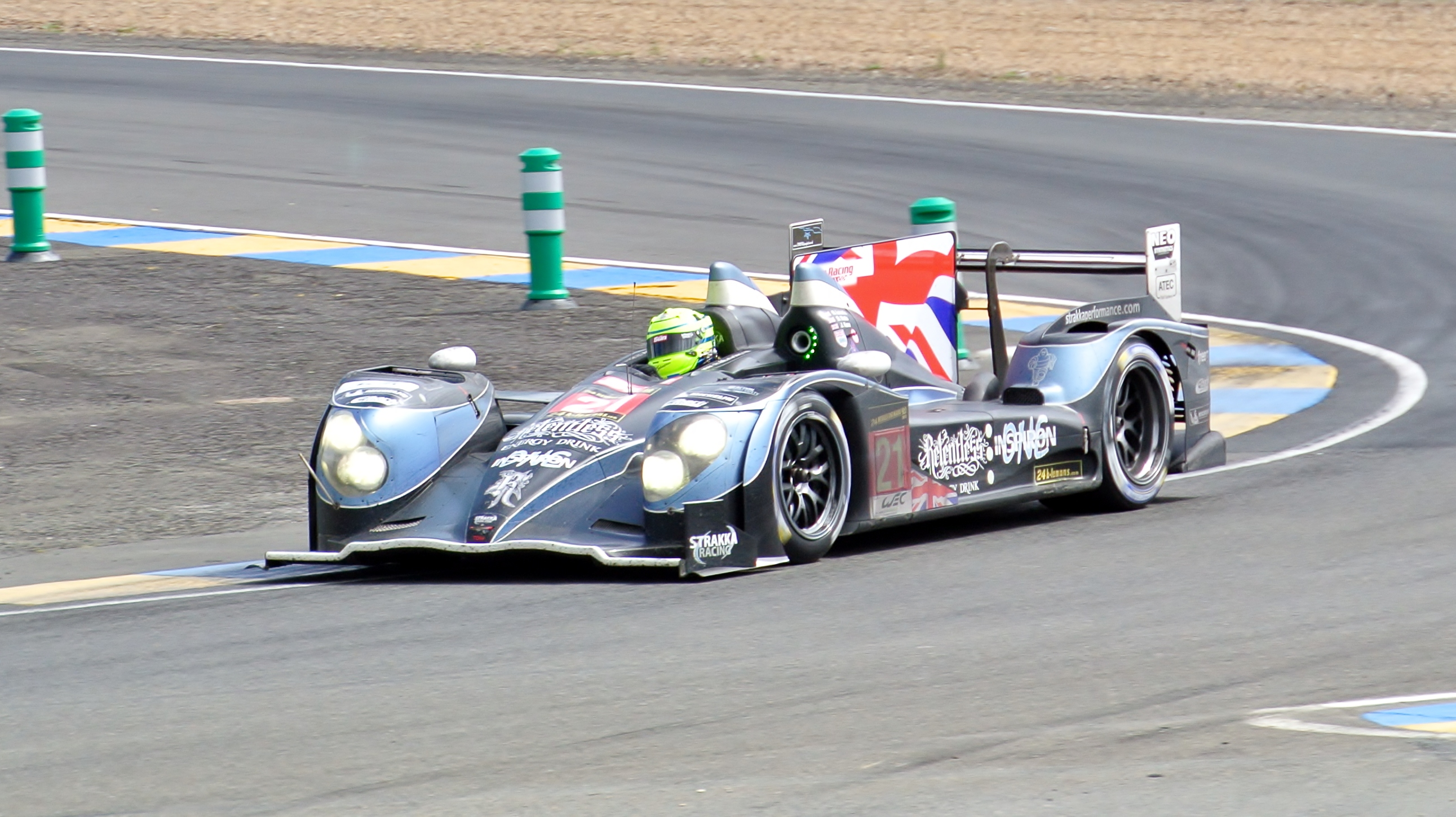
- The No. 21 ARX-03c during the 2013 24 Hours of Le Mans
- Category: Le Mans Prototype LMP1 and LMP2
- Constructor: HPD (Wirth)
- Designer: Nick Wirth
- Predecessor: Acura ARX-01, Acura ARX-02
- Successor: HPD ARX-04b

Technical specifications
- Chassis: Carbon fibre monocoque
- Suspension (front): Double wishbone with adjustable toe, camber, ride heights. Four-way damber units with separate coil springs, pushrods with anti-roll bars
- Suspension (rear): Double wishbone with adjustable toe, camber, ride heights. Four-way damber units with separate coil springs, pushrods with anti-roll bars
- Width: 2000 mm
- Height: 1030 mm
- Engine: 03a/c: Honda AR6-LMV8 3.4-litre naturally aspirated V8; 03b: Honda HR28TT 2.8-litre V6 turbocharged
- Transmission: HPD-Hewland 6 sequential with manual paddle-operated selection
- Weight: 900 kg
- Fuel: IMSA: VP MS100 E10, 100-octane gasoline + 10% ethanol WEC: – Elf LM24 E10, 101-octane gasoline + 10% ethanol
- Tyres: Michelin; Dunlop

Competition history
- Notable entrants: (United States) Muscle Milk Pickett Racing (United Kingdom) JRM (United Kingdom) Strakka Racing (United States) Starworks Motorsport (United States) Level 5 Motorsports (United States) Extreme Speed Motorsports
- Debut: 2012 12 Hours of Sebring
- First win: 2012 12 Hours of Sebring
- Last win: 2014 Monterey Grand Prix
- Last event: 2015 6 Hours of Silverstone
Races	Wins
40	34
- Teams' Championships: 5 2012 FIA WEC LMP2; 2012 ALMS P2; 2013 ALMS P2; 2012 ALMS P1; 2013 ALMS P1
- Constructors' Championships: 4 2012 ALMS P2; 2013 ALMS P2; 2012 ALMS P1; 2013 ALMS P1
- Drivers' Championships: 4 2012 ALMS P2; 2013 ALMS P2; 2012 ALMS P1; 2013 ALMS P1

The HPD ARX-03a, ARX-03b, and ARX-03c are Le Mans Prototypes race cars developed by Honda Performance Development in 2012. The 03a model utilizes a Honda V8 engine for use in the LMP1 category, while the 03b uses a turbocharged V6 engine for the LMP2 category. Three teams have already announced their use of the ARX-03 in the FIA World Endurance Championship and the American Le Mans Series, as well as at the 24 Hours of Le Mans. Muscle Milk Pickett Racing have purchased an 03a for use in the American Le Mans Series, joined by two 03bs for Level 5 Motorsports. In the 2012 FIA World Endurance Championship, Strakka Racing and JRM Racing campaigned a single 03a each, joined by a single-car 03b entry by Starworks Motorsport in LMP2.

== Racing history ==
=== 2012 ===
The HPD ARX-03 made its racing debut at the 2012 12 Hours of Sebring. The race would be the opening round of both the American Le Mans Series and the brand new FIA World Endurance Championship seasons. Muscle Milk Pickett Racing campaign a brand new ARX-03a LMP1 car, while Level 5 Motorsports campaigned two LMP2 ARX-03bs in the American Le Mans Series. After some bad luck with a fueling hose at Sebring, the Muscle Milk team went on to win the next five races in a row as well as another win at Virginia International Raceway. At the seasons final race, Petit Le Mans, Lucas Luhr was hit by a GTC class Porsche. Despite repairs needed during the race, the team was able to complete 70% of the race in order to win points. Muscle Milk Pickett Racing won both the LMP1 drivers and team championships with just 5 points over their main rivals, Dyson Racing. The Level 5 Motorsports team took first in class at the Mobil 1 12 Hours of Sebring and went on to win 7 of the next 9 races, losing only at Mosport and Road America to their main rivals, Conquest Endurance. The team was able to secure the LMP2 Teams' Championship and Drivers' Championships.

Strakka Racing, JRM and Starworks Motorsport would contest the first series of the brand new FIA World Endurance Championship. The Starworks team would claim three class victories including the season opening 12 Hours of Sebring and the 24 Hours of Le Mans and claim the LMP2 trophy with their HPD ARX-03b. Strakka Racing and JRM, competing with ARX-03a's, would finish second and third in the LMP1 Privateer Trophy behind the Swiss Rebellion Racing squad with Strakka racing claiming just one class victory.

=== 2013 ===
Muscle Milk Pickett Racing would continue with the HPD ARX-03a for the first three rounds of the 2013 ALMS season before moving to the updated -03c package for the remainder of the year. The team would claim eight wins in ten races losing out to Rebellion Racing and Audi Sport Team Joest at Sebring and suffering an overheating issue that took them out of the season ending Petit Le Mans. Extreme Speed Motorsports would join the Level 5 Motorsports team in LMP2 with the ex-Starworks -03b and another brand new chassis for 2013. Level 5 would claim wins at every race except Long Beach where they were beat out by ESM. Muscle Milk claimed the LMP1 Teams' and Drivers' Championship and Level 5 claimed the LMP2 Teams' and Drivers' Championship.

Strakka Racing would be the only team to campaign an HPD car in the 2013 season of the FIA WEC and would only campaign the first three rounds. The team retired the car at Silverstone due to damage but would go on to finish second in the privateer ranks and Spa Francorchamps and first at Le Mans in front of rival Rebellion Racing.

== Competition history ==
=== Complete American Le Mans Series results ===
(key) Races in bold indicates pole position. Races in italics indicates fastest lap.

Year	Entrant	Class	Drivers	No.	Rds.	Rounds										Pts.	Pos.
Year	Entrant	Class	Drivers	No.	Rds.	1	2	3	4	5	6	7	8	9	10	Pts.	Pos.
2012	(United States) Muscle Milk Pickett Racing	P1	(Germany) Klaus Graf (Germany) Lucas Luhr (France) Simon Pagenaud (France) Romain Dumas	6	All; All; 1; 10	**SEB**; **2†**	LBH; 1	**LGA**; **1**	LRP; 1	MOS; 1	MOH; 1	RAM; 2	BGP; 3†	VIR; 1	PLM; 3	195	1st
2012	(United States) Level 5 Motorsports	P2	(United States) Scott Tucker (Mexico) Luis Díaz (United States) Ryan Hunter-Reay (France) Franck Montagny (Mexico) Ricardo González (France) Christophe Bouchut	95	All; 1-5, 7-10; 1; 3; 6, 8; 10	SEB; Ret	LBH; 3	LGA; 1	LRP; DNS	MOS	MOH; 3	RAM; 4	BGP; 2	VIR; DSQ	PLM; 1	203	1st
2012	(United States) Level 5 Motorsports	P2	(United States) Scott Tucker (France) Christophe Bouchut (Portugal) João Barbosa (France) Franck Montagny (United Kingdom) Dario Franchitti (United Kingdom) Marino Franchitti	055	All; 1-9; 1-2; 3; 10; 10	**SEB**; **1**	**LBH**; **1**	**LGA**; **3**	LRP; 1	MOS; 2	MOH; 1	RAM; 3	BGP; 1	VIR; 1	PLM; 2	203	1st
2013	(United States) Muscle Milk Pickett Racing	P1	(Germany) Klaus Graf (Germany) Lucas Luhr (France) Romain Dumas	6	All; All; 1, 10	SEB; 4	LBH; 1	LAG; 1	**LRP**; **1**	**MOS**; **1**	**ELK**; **1**	**BAL**; **1**	**COA**; **1**	VIR; 1	PET; Ret	182	1st
2013	(United States) Extreme Speed Motorsports	P2	(United States) Scott Sharp (United States) Guy Cosmo (Australia) David Brabham (United States) Anthony Lazzaro	01	All; 1-6; 1, 10; 7-10	SEB; 5	LBH; 1	LAG; 3	LRP; 2	MOS; 2	ELK; 2	BAL; 2	COA; 4	VIR; 2	**PET**; **2**	166	2nd
2013	(United States) Extreme Speed Motorsports	P2	(United States) Ed Brown (United States) Johannes van Overbeek (United States) Anthony Lazzaro (United Kingdom) Rob Bell	02	All; All; 1; 10	SEB; 4	LBH; 2	LAG; Ret	LRP; 4	MOS; 4	ELK; Ret	BAL; 3	COA; 3	VIR; Ret	PET; 4	166	2nd
2013	(United States) Level 5 Motorsports	P2	(United States) Scott Tucker (Australia) Ryan Briscoe (United Kingdom) Marino Franchitti (France) Simon Pagenaud	551	All; 1-2, 4, 7-10; 1, 3, 5, 10; 6	**SEB**; **1**	**LBH**; **3**	**LAG**; **1**	**LRP**; **1**	MOS; 1	ELK; 1	**BAL**; **Ret**	COA; 1	**VIR**; **1**	PET; 1	199	1st
2013	(United States) Level 5 Motorsports	P2	(United States) Scott Tucker (United States) Ryan Hunter-Reay (France) Simon Pagenaud (United Kingdom) Marino Franchitti (Australia) Ryan Briscoe (United Kingdom) Mike Conway (Mexico) Ricardo González (United States) Guy Cosmo (Sweden) Stefan Johansson (United Kingdom) Jonny Kane (United Kingdom) Peter Dumbreck	552	1-8; 1; 1; 2, 4, 6-9; 3; 5; 6; 7-10; 9; 10; 10	SEB; 2	LBH; 4	LAG; 2	LRP; 3	**MOS**; **3**	**ELK**; **2**	BAL; 1	**COA**; **2**	VIR; 3	PET; 3	199	1st

=== Complete United SportsCar Championship results ===
(key) Races in bold indicates pole position. Races in italics indicates fastest lap.

Year	Entrant	Class	Drivers	No.	Rds.	Rounds											Pts.	Pos.
Year	Entrant	Class	Drivers	No.	Rds.	1	2	3	4	5	6	7	8	9	10	11	Pts.	Pos.
2014	(United States) Extreme Speed Motorsports	P	(United Kingdom) Ryan Dalziel (United States) Scott Sharp (Australia) David Brabham	1	1–5, 7–10; 1–5, 7–10; 1–2	DAY; 15	SEB; 2	LBH; 6	LGA; 11	DET; 5	WGL; 10	MOS; 8	**IMS**; **5**	**ELK**; **3**	COA	PET	10th	228
2014	(United States) Extreme Speed Motorsports	P	(United States) Ed Brown (United States) Johannes van Overbeek (France) Simon Pagenaud (United States) Anthony Lazzaro	2	1–5, 7–10, 12; 1–5, 7–10, 12; 1–2; 1, 7	DAY; 7	SEB; 5	LBH; 7	**LGA**; **1**	DET; 7	WGL; 11	MOS; 7	IMS; 7	ELK; 8	COA; 4	PET	7th	262
2015	(United States) Tequila Patrón ESM	P	(United States) Scott Sharp (United Kingdom) Ryan Dalziel (Denmark) David Heinemeier Hansson	1	2; 2; 2	DAY	SEB; 9	LBH	LGA	DET	WGL	MOS	ELK	COA	PET		45*	12th*
2015	(United States) Tequila Patrón ESM	P	(United States) Ed Brown (United States) Jon Fogarty (United States) Johannes van Overbeek	2	2; 2; 2	DAY	SEB; 8	LBH	LGA	DET	WGL	MOS	ELK	COA	PET		42*	13th*

* Points were scored with the ARX-04b

== Gallery ==
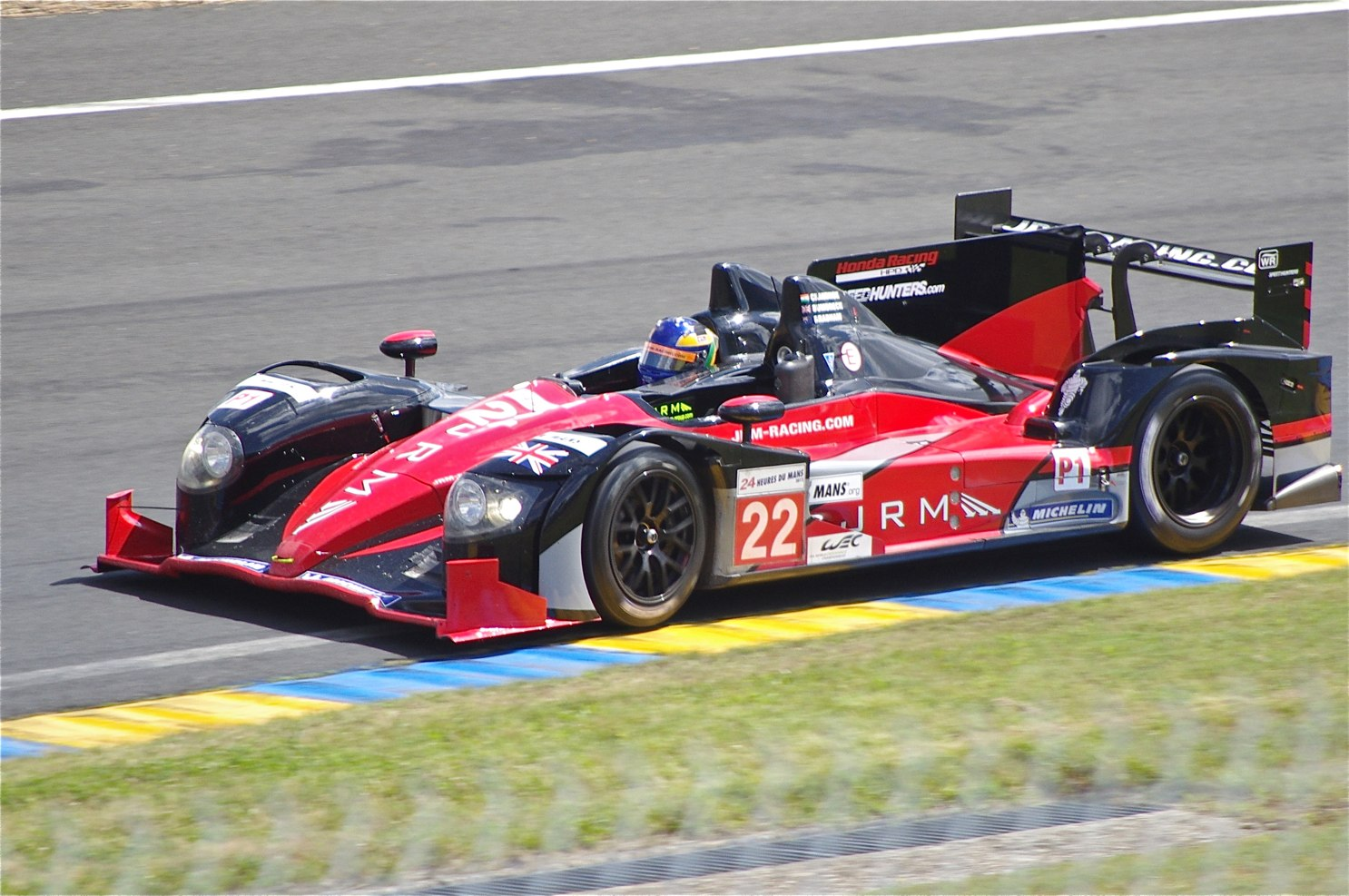
HPD ARX 03a, JRM

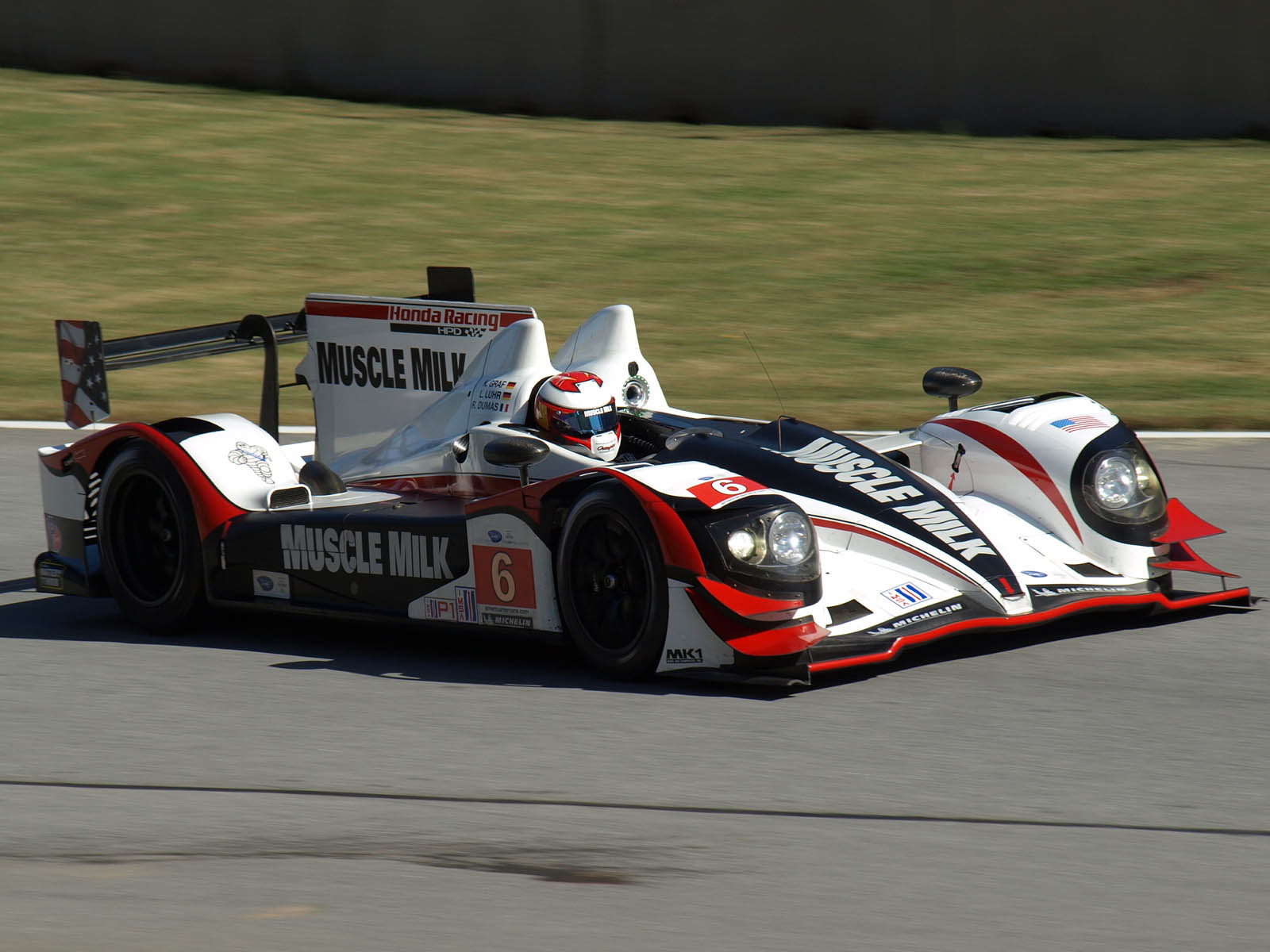
HPD ARX 03a, Muscle Milk Pickett

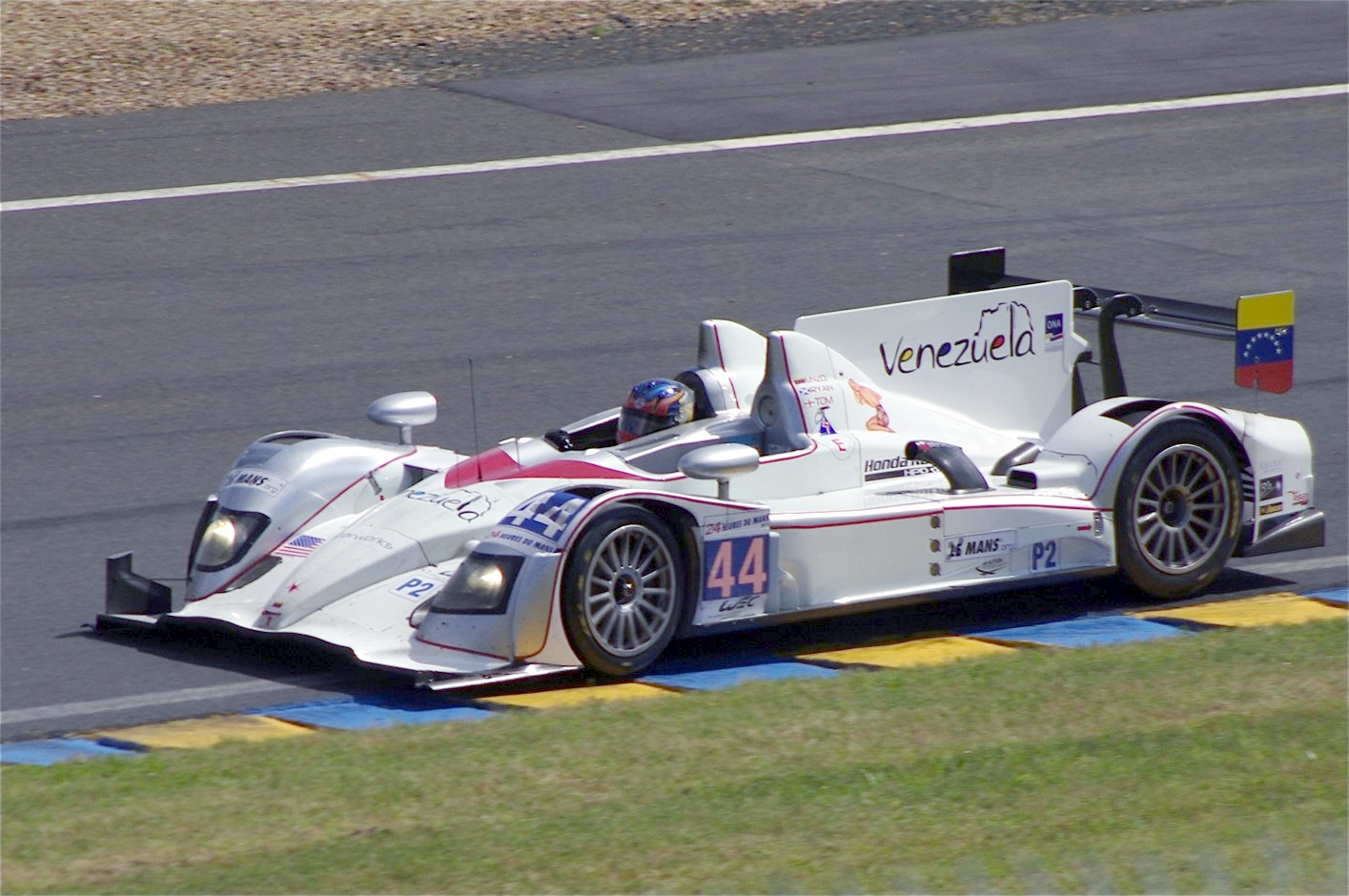
HPD ARX-03b, Starworks

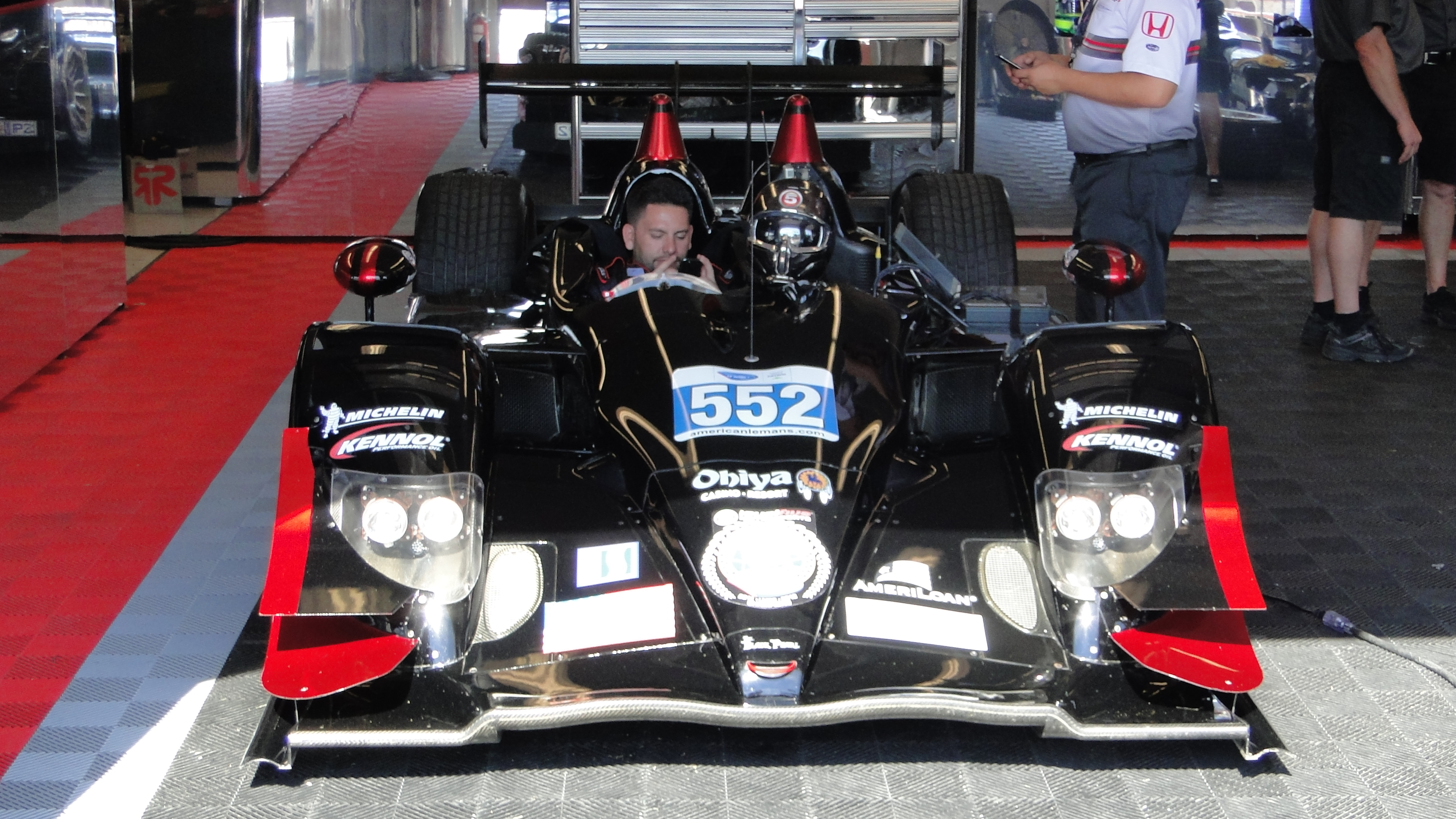
HPD ARX-03b, Level 5
