= 2013 American Le Mans Monterey =

Track map of Mazda Raceway Laguna Seca

The 2013 American Le Mans Series Monterey was an auto racing event held at Mazda Raceway Laguna Seca, near Monterey, California on May 9–11, 2013. The four-hour race was the third round of the 2013 American Le Mans Series season. Germans Klaus Graf and Lucas Luhr defended their 2012 Monterey win with overall victory for Muscle Milk Pickett Racing, while Luhr became the winningest driver in American Le Mans Series history. Scott Tucker and Marino Franchitti took P2 honors for Level 5 Motorsports, while Mike Gausch and Luis Díaz won the PC category. Corvette Racing's Jan Magnussen and Antonio García led GT and Henrique Cisneros, Jr. and Nick Tandy won in GTC.

== Background ==
=== Preview ===
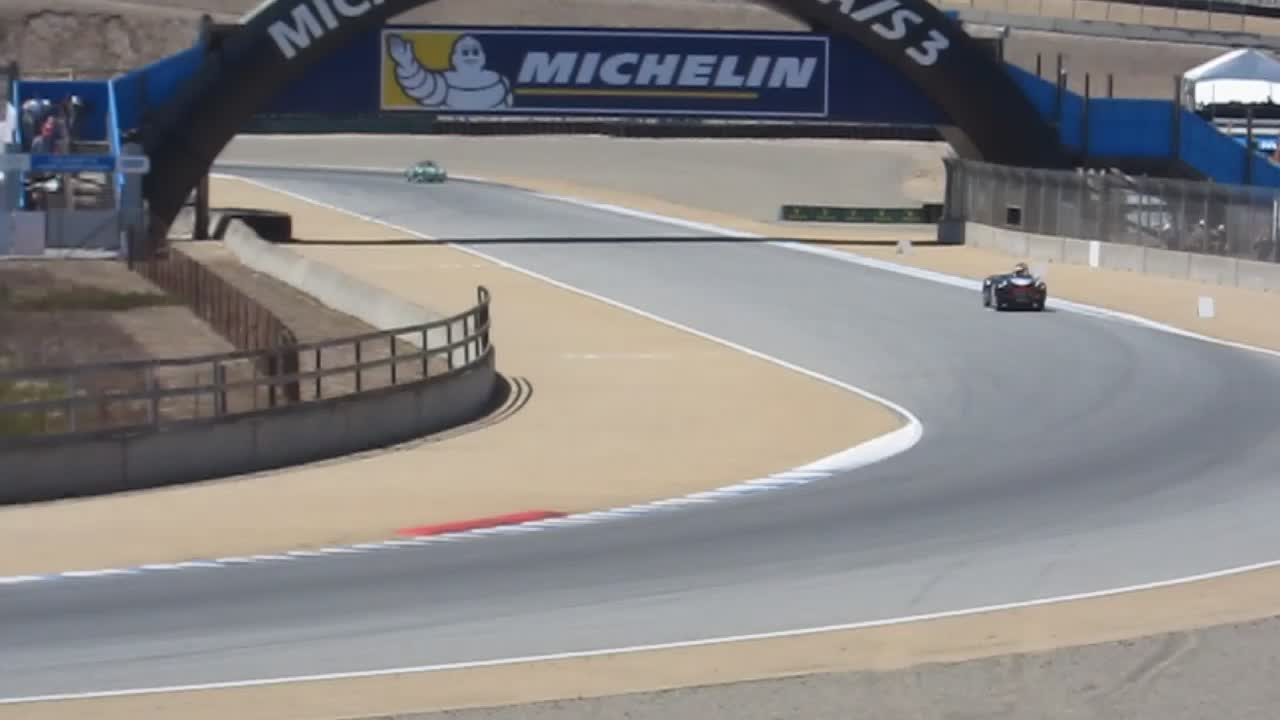
Mazda Raceway Laguna Seca, where the race was held.

American Le Mans Series (ALMS) president Scott Atherton confirmed the race was part of the schedule for the 2013 American Le Mans Series schedule in October 2012. It was the fifteenth consecutive year the event was held as part of the American Le Mans Series. The 2013 American Le Mans Monterey was the third of ten scheduled sports car races of 2013 American Le Mans Series. The event was held at the eleven-turn 2.238 mi (3.602 km) Mazda Raceway Laguna Seca in Monterey County, California on May 11, 2013. The event was shortened from 6 hours to 4 hours.

Before the race, Nick Heidfeld and Neel Jani led the P1 Drivers' Championship with 40 points, ahead of Klaus Graf and Lucas Luhr on countback with 40 points. With 92 points, Ryan Briscoe and Scott Tucker led the P2 Drivers' Championship over Marino Franchitti by 3 points. In PC, Mike Guasch led the Drivers' Championship with 40 points, ahead of Colin Braun. Oliver Gavin and Tommy Milner led the GT Drivers' Championship with 34 points, ahead of Bill Auberlen and Maxime Martin on countback. With 37 points, Henrique Cisneros and Sean Edwards led the GTC Drivers' Championship, ahead of Nelson Canache Jr. and Spencer Pumpelly.

== Qualifying ==
=== Qualifying result ===
Pole position winners in each class are marked in bold.

Pos	Class	Team	Driver	Lap Time	Grid
1	**P1**	**#12 Rebellion Racing**	**Neel Jani**	**1:13.429**	1
2	P1	#16 Dyson Racing Team	Guy Smith	1:13.806	2
3	P1	#6 Muscle Milk Pickett Racing	Klaus Graf	1:13.954	3
4	**P2**	**#551 Level 5 Motorsports**	**Marino Franchitti**	**1:16.642**	4
5	P2	#552 Level 5 Motorsports	Ryan Briscoe	1:17.002	5
6	**PC**	**#05 CORE Autosport**	**Colin Braun**	**1:18.382**	6
7	P2	#02 Extreme Speed Motorsports	Johannes van Overbeek	1:18.591	7
8	PC	#81 DragonSpeed Mishumotors	Renger van der Zande	1:18.685	8
9	P2	#01 Extreme Speed Motorsports	Guy Cosmo	1:18.880	9
10	PC	#9 RSR Racing	Bruno Junqueira	1:19.076	10
11	PC	#51 PR1/Mathiasen Motorsports	Luis Díaz	1:19.302	11
12	PC	#8 BAR1 Motorsports	Kyle Marcelli	1:19.436	12
13	PC	#18 Performance Tech Motorsports	Tristan Nunez	1:19.757	13
14	PC	#7 BAR1 Motorsports	Rusty Mitchell	1:19.762	14
15	P1	#0 DeltaWing Racing Cars	Katherine Legge	1:22.078	34^{1}
16	**GT**	**#62 Risi Competizione**	**Matteo Malucelli**	**1:22.732**	15
17	GT	#17 Team Falken Tire	Bryan Sellers	1:22.908	16
18	GT	#4 Corvette Racing	Oliver Gavin	1:22.924	17
19	GT	#55 BMW Team RLL	Maxime Martin	1:22.990	18
20	GT	#3 Corvette Racing	Antonio García	1:23.042	19
21	GT	#23 Team West/AJR/Boardwalk Ferrari	Townsend Bell	1:23.217	20
22	GT	#56 BMW Team RLL	Dirk Müller	1:23.406	21
23	GT	#91 SRT Motorsports	Marc Goossens	1:23.615	22
24	GT	#48 Paul Miller Racing	Bryce Miller	1:23.743	23
25	GT	#93 SRT Motorsports	Kuno Wittmer	1:24.031	24
26	**GTC**	**#22 Alex Job Racing**	**Jeroen Bleekemolen**	**1:27.296**	25
27	GTC	#30 NGT Motorsports	Nick Tandy	1:27.407	26
28	GTC	#27 Dempsey Del Piero Racing	Andy Lally	1:27.495	27
29	GTC	#45 Flying Lizard Motorsports	Spencer Pumpelly	1:27.628	28
30	GTC	#11 JDX Racing	Jan Heylen	1:28.272	29
31	GTC	#44 Flying Lizard Motorsports	Dion von Moltke	1:28.424	30
32	GTC	#10 Dempsey Del Piero Racing	Andrew Davis	1:28.741	31
33	GTC	#66 TRG	Ben Keating	1:29.545	35^{1}
34	GTC	#99 Competition Motorsports	Cort Wagner	1:29.604	32
35	GTC	#68 TRG	Andrew Novich	1:30.151	33
–	GT	#06 CORE Autosport	Patrick Long	No Time^{2}	36

- **^1** - The #0 DeltaWing and #66 Porsche were moved to the back of the grid for not using their elected driver during qualifying.
- **^2** - The #06 Porsche had its qualifying times disallowed after the car failed post-qualifying technical inspection.

== Race ==
=== Race result ===
Class winners in bold. Cars failing to complete 70% of their class winner's distance are marked as Not Classified (NC).

Pos	Class	No	Team	Drivers	Chassis	Tire	Laps
Pos	Class	No	Team	Drivers	Engine	Tire	Laps
1	**P1**	**6**	**(United States) Muscle Milk Pickett Racing**	**(Germany) Klaus Graf (Germany) Lucas Luhr**	**HPD ARX-03a**	M	**150**
1	**P1**	**6**	**(United States) Muscle Milk Pickett Racing**	**(Germany) Klaus Graf (Germany) Lucas Luhr**	**Honda 3.4 L V8**	M	**150**
2	P1	12	(Switzerland) Rebellion Racing	(Germany) Nick Heidfeld (Switzerland) Neel Jani	Lola B12/60	M	150
2	P1	12	(Switzerland) Rebellion Racing	(Germany) Nick Heidfeld (Switzerland) Neel Jani	Toyota RV8KLM 3.4 L V8	M	150
3	**P2**	**551**	**(United States) Level 5 Motorsports**	**(United States) Scott Tucker (United Kingdom) Marino Franchitti**	**HPD ARX-03b**	M	**146**
3	**P2**	**551**	**(United States) Level 5 Motorsports**	**(United States) Scott Tucker (United Kingdom) Marino Franchitti**	**Honda HR28TT 2.8 L Turbo V6**	M	**146**
4	P2	552	(United States) Level 5 Motorsports	(United States) Scott Tucker (Australia) Ryan Briscoe	HPD ARX-03b	M	146
4	P2	552	(United States) Level 5 Motorsports	(United States) Scott Tucker (Australia) Ryan Briscoe	Honda HR28TT 2.8 L Turbo V6	M	146
5	**PC**	**52**	**(United States) PR1/Mathiasen Motorsports**	**(Mexico) Luis Díaz (United States) Mike Guasch**	**Oreca FLM09**	C	**145**
5	**PC**	**52**	**(United States) PR1/Mathiasen Motorsports**	**(Mexico) Luis Díaz (United States) Mike Guasch**	**Chevrolet 6.2 L V8**	C	**145**
6	PC	05	(United States) CORE Autosport	(United States) Jon Bennett (United States) Colin Braun	Oreca FLM09	C	145
6	PC	05	(United States) CORE Autosport	(United States) Jon Bennett (United States) Colin Braun	Chevrolet 6.2 L V8	C	145
7	PC	18	(United States) Performance Tech Motorsports	(United States) Tristan Nunez (United States) Charlie Shears	Oreca FLM09	C	144
7	PC	18	(United States) Performance Tech Motorsports	(United States) Tristan Nunez (United States) Charlie Shears	Chevrolet 6.2 L V8	C	144
8	PC	8	(United States) BAR1 Motorsports	(Canada) Kyle Marcelli (Canada) Chris Cumming	Oreca FLM09	C	144
8	PC	8	(United States) BAR1 Motorsports	(Canada) Kyle Marcelli (Canada) Chris Cumming	Chevrolet 6.2 L V8	C	144
9	**GT**	**3**	**(United States) Corvette Racing**	**(Denmark) Jan Magnussen (Spain) Antonio García**	**Chevrolet Corvette C6.R**	M	**142**
9	**GT**	**3**	**(United States) Corvette Racing**	**(Denmark) Jan Magnussen (Spain) Antonio García**	**Chevrolet 5.5 L V8**	M	**142**
10	GT	17	(United States) Team Falken Tire	(United States) Bryan Sellers (Germany) Wolf Henzler	Porsche 997 GT3-RSR	F	142^{3}
10	GT	17	(United States) Team Falken Tire	(United States) Bryan Sellers (Germany) Wolf Henzler	Porsche 4.0 L Flat-6	F	142^{3}
11	GT	56	(United States) BMW Team RLL	(United States) John Edwards (Germany) Dirk Müller	BMW Z4 GTE	M	142
11	GT	56	(United States) BMW Team RLL	(United States) John Edwards (Germany) Dirk Müller	BMW 4.4 L V8	M	142
12	GT	23	(United States) Team West/AJR/Boardwalk Ferrari	(United States) Townsend Bell (United States) Bill Sweedler	Ferrari 458 Italia GT2	Y	142
12	GT	23	(United States) Team West/AJR/Boardwalk Ferrari	(United States) Townsend Bell (United States) Bill Sweedler	Ferrari 4.5 L V8	Y	142
13	GT	91	(United States) SRT Motorsports	(Belgium) Marc Goossens (Germany) Dominik Farnbacher	SRT Viper GTS-R	M	142
13	GT	91	(United States) SRT Motorsports	(Belgium) Marc Goossens (Germany) Dominik Farnbacher	SRT 8.0 L V10	M	142
14	PC	81	(United States) DragonSpeed Mishumotors	(Germany) Mirco Schultis (Netherlands) Renger van der Zande	Oreca FLM09	C	142
14	PC	81	(United States) DragonSpeed Mishumotors	(Germany) Mirco Schultis (Netherlands) Renger van der Zande	Chevrolet 6.2 L V8	C	142
15	GT	48	(United States) Paul Miller Racing	(United States) Bryce Miller (Germany) Marco Holzer	Porsche 997 GT3-RSR	M	142
15	GT	48	(United States) Paul Miller Racing	(United States) Bryce Miller (Germany) Marco Holzer	Porsche 4.0 L Flat-6	M	142
16	P2	01	(United States) Extreme Speed Motorsports	(United States) Scott Sharp (United States) Guy Cosmo	HPD ARX-03b	M	142
16	P2	01	(United States) Extreme Speed Motorsports	(United States) Scott Sharp (United States) Guy Cosmo	Honda HR28TT 2.8 L Turbo V6	M	142
17	PC	7	(United States) BAR1 Motorsports	(United States) Tomy Drissi (United States) Rusty Mitchell	Oreca FLM09	C	141
17	PC	7	(United States) BAR1 Motorsports	(United States) Tomy Drissi (United States) Rusty Mitchell	Chevrolet 6.2 L V8	C	141
18	GT	06	(United States) CORE Autosport	(United States) Patrick Long (United Kingdom) Tom Kimber-Smith	Porsche 997 GT3-RSR	M	140
18	GT	06	(United States) CORE Autosport	(United States) Patrick Long (United Kingdom) Tom Kimber-Smith	Porsche 4.0 L Flat-6	M	140
19	GT	62	(United States) Risi Competizione	(Monaco) Olivier Beretta (Italy) Matteo Malucelli	Ferrari 458 Italia GT2	M	139
19	GT	62	(United States) Risi Competizione	(Monaco) Olivier Beretta (Italy) Matteo Malucelli	Ferrari 4.5 L V8	M	139
20	**GTC**	**30**	**(United States) NGT Motorsport**	**(United States) Henrique Cisneros (United Kingdom) Nick Tandy**	**Porsche 997 GT3 Cup**	Y	**137**
20	**GTC**	**30**	**(United States) NGT Motorsport**	**(United States) Henrique Cisneros (United Kingdom) Nick Tandy**	**Porsche 4.0 L Flat-6**	Y	**137**
21	GTC	27	(United States) Dempsey Del Piero Racing	(United States) Patrick Dempsey (United States) Andy Lally	Porsche 997 GT3 Cup	Y	137
21	GTC	27	(United States) Dempsey Del Piero Racing	(United States) Patrick Dempsey (United States) Andy Lally	Porsche 4.0 L Flat-6	Y	137
22	GTC	22	(United States) Alex Job Racing	(United States) Cooper MacNeil (Netherlands) Jeroen Bleekemolen	Porsche 997 GT3 Cup	Y	137
22	GTC	22	(United States) Alex Job Racing	(United States) Cooper MacNeil (Netherlands) Jeroen Bleekemolen	Porsche 4.0 L Flat-6	Y	137
23	GTC	66	(United States) TRG	(United States) Ben Keating (Republic of Ireland) Damien Faulkner	Porsche 997 GT3 Cup	Y	137
23	GTC	66	(United States) TRG	(United States) Ben Keating (Republic of Ireland) Damien Faulkner	Porsche 4.0 L Flat-6	Y	137
24	GTC	11	(United States) JDX Racing	(United States) Mike Hedlund (Belgium) Jan Heylen	Porsche 997 GT3 Cup	Y	137
24	GTC	11	(United States) JDX Racing	(United States) Mike Hedlund (Belgium) Jan Heylen	Porsche 4.0 L Flat-6	Y	137
25	GTC	10	(United States) Dempsey Del Piero Racing	(United States) Michael Avenatti (United States) Andrew Davis	Porsche 997 GT3 Cup	Y	137
25	GTC	10	(United States) Dempsey Del Piero Racing	(United States) Michael Avenatti (United States) Andrew Davis	Porsche 4.0 L Flat-6	Y	137
26	GT	4	(United States) Corvette Racing	(United Kingdom) Oliver Gavin (United States) Tommy Milner	Chevrolet Corvette C6.R	M	136
26	GT	4	(United States) Corvette Racing	(United Kingdom) Oliver Gavin (United States) Tommy Milner	Chevrolet 5.5 L V8	M	136
27	GTC	68	(United States) TRG	(United States) Andrew Novich (United States) Craig Stanton	Porsche 997 GT3 Cup	Y	135
27	GTC	68	(United States) TRG	(United States) Andrew Novich (United States) Craig Stanton	Porsche 4.0 L Flat-6	Y	135
28	GTC	45	(United States) Flying Lizard Motorsports	(United States) Spencer Pumpelly (United States) Seth Neiman (Venezuela) Nelson Canache, Jr.	Porsche 997 GT3 Cup	Y	134
28	GTC	45	(United States) Flying Lizard Motorsports	(United States) Spencer Pumpelly (United States) Seth Neiman (Venezuela) Nelson Canache, Jr.	Porsche 4.0 L Flat-6	Y	134
29	PC	9	(United States) RSR Racing	(Brazil) Bruno Junqueira (United States) Duncan Ende	Oreca FLM09	C	132
29	PC	9	(United States) RSR Racing	(Brazil) Bruno Junqueira (United States) Duncan Ende	Chevrolet 6.2 L V8	C	132
30	GTC	44	(United States) Flying Lizard Motorsports	(Germany) Pierre Ehret (South Africa) Dion von Moltke	Porsche 997 GT3 Cup	Y	129
30	GTC	44	(United States) Flying Lizard Motorsports	(Germany) Pierre Ehret (South Africa) Dion von Moltke	Porsche 4.0 L Flat-6	Y	129
31	GTC	99	(United States) Competition Motorsports	(United States) Cort Wagner (United States) Ted Ballou	Porsche 997 GT3 Cup	Y	122
31	GTC	99	(United States) Competition Motorsports	(United States) Cort Wagner (United States) Ted Ballou	Porsche 4.0 L Flat-6	Y	122
32 DNF	P1	0	(United States) DeltaWing Racing Cars	(United Kingdom) Katherine Legge (United Kingdom) Andy Meyrick	DeltaWing LM12	B	104
32 DNF	P1	0	(United States) DeltaWing Racing Cars	(United Kingdom) Katherine Legge (United Kingdom) Andy Meyrick	Élan 1.9 L Turbo I4	B	104
33 DNF	GT	55	(United States) BMW Team RLL	(United States) Bill Auberlen (Belgium) Maxime Martin	BMW Z4 GTE	M	85
33 DNF	GT	55	(United States) BMW Team RLL	(United States) Bill Auberlen (Belgium) Maxime Martin	BMW 4.4 L V8	M	85
34 DNF	P2	02	(United States) Extreme Speed Motorsports	(United States) Ed Brown (United States) Johannes van Overbeek	HPD ARX-03b	M	64
34 DNF	P2	02	(United States) Extreme Speed Motorsports	(United States) Ed Brown (United States) Johannes van Overbeek	Honda HR28TT 2.8 L Turbo V6	M	64
35 DNF	P1	16	(United States) Dyson Racing Team	(United States) Chris Dyson (United Kingdom) Guy Smith	Lola B12/60	M	21
35 DNF	P1	16	(United States) Dyson Racing Team	(United States) Chris Dyson (United Kingdom) Guy Smith	Mazda MZR-R 2.0 L Turbo I4 (Butanol)	M	21
36 DNF	GT	93	(United States) SRT Motorsports	(Canada) Kuno Wittmer (United States) Jonathan Bomarito	SRT Viper GTS-R	M	12
36 DNF	GT	93	(United States) SRT Motorsports	(Canada) Kuno Wittmer (United States) Jonathan Bomarito	SRT 8.0 L V10	M	12

- **^3** - The #17 Porsche failed post-race technical inspection, forfeiting all championship points but still maintaining its finishing position in the race.

American Le Mans Series
Previous race: American Le Mans Series at Long Beach	2013 season	Next race: Northeast Grand Prix
