= 2013 American Le Mans Series at Long Beach =

The Long Beach Street Circuit

The 2013 Tequila Patrón American Le Mans Series at Long Beach was an auto race held on the Long Beach Street Circuit in Long Beach, California on April 20 and 21, 2013. The seventh running of the Long Beach event for the American Le Mans Series, this was the second round of the 2013 season. The race weekend was shared with the IndyCar Series, which ran the Grand Prix of Long Beach. Germans Klaus Graf and Lucas Luhr of Muscle Milk Pickett Racing won the race for the third year in succession. The PC category was led by Colin Braun and Jon Bennett of CORE Autosport, while Scott Sharp and Guy Cosmo's Extreme Speed Motorsports entry was victorious in the P2 class. The BMW Team RLL squad scored a one-two victory, led by Bill Auberlen and Maxime Martin; Henrique Cisneros Jr. and Sean Edwards won the GTC class for NGT Motorsports.

== Background ==
=== Preview ===
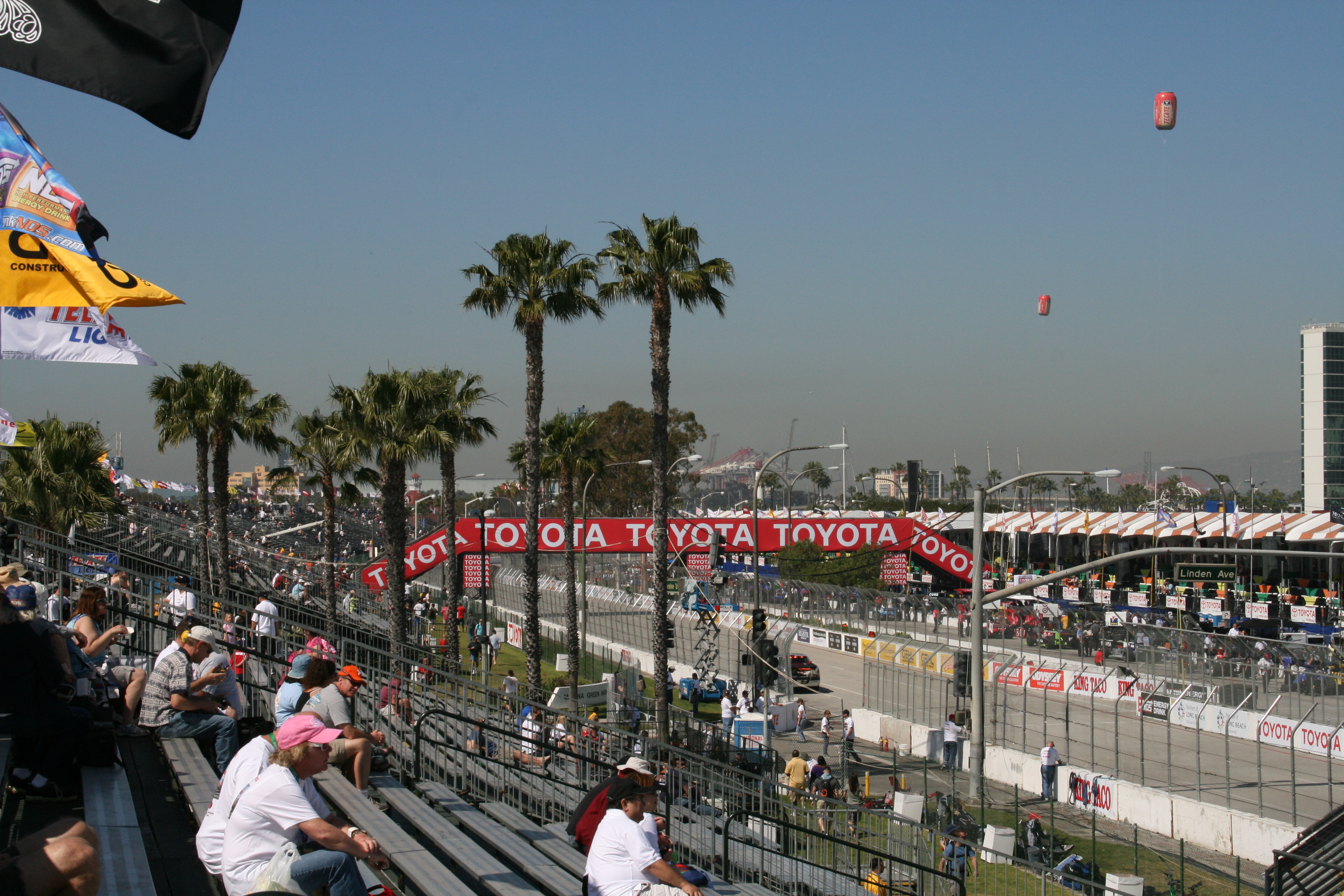
The Long Beach Street Circuit (pictured in 2009), where the race was held.

American Le Mans Series (ALMS) president Scott Atherton confirmed the race was part of the schedule for the 2013 American Le Mans Series schedule in October 2012. It was the seventh consecutive year the event was held as part of the American Le Mans Series. The 2013 Tequila Patrón American Le Mans Series at Long Beach was the second of ten scheduled sports car races of 2013 American Le Mans Series. The race was held at the eleven-turn 1.968 mi (3.167 km) Long Beach street circuit in Long Beach, California on April 21, 2013.

== Qualifying ==
=== Qualifying result ===
Pole position winners in each class are marked in bold.

Pos	Class	Team	Driver	Lap Time	Grid
1	**P1**	**#12 Rebellion Racing**	**Neel Jani**	**1:12.600**	1
2	P1	#16 Dyson Racing	Guy Smith	1:13.282	2
3	P1	#6 Muscle Milk Pickett Racing	Lucas Luhr	1:14.004	3
4	**P2**	**#551 Level 5 Motorsports**	**Ryan Briscoe**	**1:16.014**	4
5	**PC**	**#9 RSR Racing**	**Bruno Junqueira**	**1:16.167**	5
6	PC	#05 CORE Autosport	Colin Braun	1:16.222	6
7	PC	#52 PR1/Mathiasen Motorsports	Luis Díaz	1:16.630	7
8	PC	#8 BAR1 Motorsports	Kyle Marcelli	1:16.654	8
9	PC	#18 Performance Tech Motorsports	Tristan Nunez	1:16.834	9
10	PC	#7 BAR1 Motorsports	Rusty Mitchell	1:17.176	10
11	P2	#01 Extreme Speed Motorsports	Scott Sharp	1:17.390	11
12	P2	#02 Extreme Speed Motorsports	Johannes van Overbeek	1:17.432	12
13	**GT**	**#91 SRT Motorsports**	**Dominik Farnbacher**	**1:18.845**	13
14	GT	#17 Team Falken Tire	Bryan Sellers	1:18.967	14
15	GT	#93 SRT Motorsports	Jonathan Bomarito	1:18.984	15
16	GT	#3 Corvette Racing	Jan Magnussen	1:19.047	16
17	GT	#55 BMW Team RLL	Bill Auberlen	1:19.063	17
18	GT	#4 Corvette Racing	Tommy Milner	1:19.083	18
19	GT	#62 Risi Competizione	Olivier Beretta	1:19.184	19
20	GT	#56 BMW Team RLL	Joey Hand	1:19.258	20
21	GT	#23 Team West/AJR/Boardwalk Ferrari	Townsend Bell	1:19.533	21
22	P2	#552 Level 5 Motorsports	Scott Tucker	1:19.711	22
23	**GTC**	**#22 Alex Job Racing**	**Jeroen Bleekemolen**	**1:22.850**	23
24	GTC	#30 NGT Motorsports	Sean Edwards	1:22.971	24
25	GTC	#45 Flying Lizard Motorsports	Spencer Pumpelly	1:23.014	25
26	GTC	#66 TRG	Damien Faulkner	1:23.355	26
27	GTC	#11 JDX Racing	Jan Heylen	1:23.701	27
28	GTC	#68 TRG	Craig Stanton	1:23.745	28
29	GTC	#44 Flying Lizard Motorsports	Dion von Moltke	1:24.239	29
30	GTC	#10 Dempsey Del Piero Racing	Bob Faieta	1:24.583	30
31	GTC	#27 Dempsey Del Piero Racing	Joe Foster	1:25.091	31
32	GT	#48 Paul Miller Racing	Marco Holzer	1:27.491	32
33	GTC	#99 Competition Motorsports	David Calvert-Jones	No Time	33

== Race ==
=== Race result ===
Class winners in bold. Cars failing to complete 70% of their class winner's distance are marked as Not Classified (NC).

Pos	Class	No	Team	Drivers	Chassis	Tire	Laps
Pos	Class	No	Team	Drivers	Engine	Tire	Laps
1	**P1**	**6**	**(United States) Muscle Milk Pickett Racing**	**(Germany) Klaus Graf (Germany) Lucas Luhr**	**HPD ARX-03a**	M	**80**
1	**P1**	**6**	**(United States) Muscle Milk Pickett Racing**	**(Germany) Klaus Graf (Germany) Lucas Luhr**	**Honda 3.4 L V8**	M	**80**
2	P1	12	(Switzerland) Rebellion Racing	(Germany) Nick Heidfeld (Switzerland) Neel Jani	Lola B12/60	M	80
2	P1	12	(Switzerland) Rebellion Racing	(Germany) Nick Heidfeld (Switzerland) Neel Jani	Toyota RV8KLM 3.4 L V8	M	80
3	**PC**	**05**	**(United States) CORE Autosport**	**(United States) Jon Bennett (United States) Colin Braun**	**Oreca FLM09**	C	**79**
3	**PC**	**05**	**(United States) CORE Autosport**	**(United States) Jon Bennett (United States) Colin Braun**	**Chevrolet 6.2 L V8**	C	**79**
4	PC	52	(United States) PR1/Mathiasen Motorsports	(Mexico) Luis Díaz (United States) Mike Guasch	Oreca FLM09	C	79
4	PC	52	(United States) PR1/Mathiasen Motorsports	(Mexico) Luis Díaz (United States) Mike Guasch	Chevrolet 6.2 L V8	C	79
5	PC	9	(United States) RSR Racing	(Brazil) Bruno Junqueira (United States) Duncan Ende	Oreca FLM09	C	79
5	PC	9	(United States) RSR Racing	(Brazil) Bruno Junqueira (United States) Duncan Ende	Chevrolet 6.2 L V8	C	79
6	**P2**	**01**	**(United States) Extreme Speed Motorsports**	**(United States) Scott Sharp (United States) Guy Cosmo**	**HPD ARX-03b**	M	**79**
6	**P2**	**01**	**(United States) Extreme Speed Motorsports**	**(United States) Scott Sharp (United States) Guy Cosmo**	**Honda HR28TT 2.8 L Turbo V6**	M	**79**
7	**GT**	**55**	**(United States) BMW Team RLL**	**(United States) Bill Auberlen (Belgium) Maxime Martin**	**BMW Z4 GTE**	M	**78**
7	**GT**	**55**	**(United States) BMW Team RLL**	**(United States) Bill Auberlen (Belgium) Maxime Martin**	**BMW 4.4 L V8**	M	**78**
8	P2	02	(United States) Extreme Speed Motorsports	(United States) Ed Brown (United States) Johannes van Overbeek	HPD ARX-03b	M	78
8	P2	02	(United States) Extreme Speed Motorsports	(United States) Ed Brown (United States) Johannes van Overbeek	Honda HR28TT 2.8 L Turbo V6	M	78
9	GT	56	(United States) BMW Team RLL	(United States) Joey Hand (Germany) Dirk Müller	BMW Z4 GTE	M	78
9	GT	56	(United States) BMW Team RLL	(United States) Joey Hand (Germany) Dirk Müller	BMW 4.4 L V8	M	78
10	GT	91	(United States) SRT Motorsports	(Belgium) Marc Goossens (Germany) Dominik Farnbacher	SRT Viper GTS-R	M	78
10	GT	91	(United States) SRT Motorsports	(Belgium) Marc Goossens (Germany) Dominik Farnbacher	SRT 8.0 L V10	M	78
11	GT	4	(United States) Corvette Racing	(United Kingdom) Oliver Gavin (United States) Tommy Milner	Chevrolet Corvette C6.R	M	78
11	GT	4	(United States) Corvette Racing	(United Kingdom) Oliver Gavin (United States) Tommy Milner	Chevrolet 5.5 L V8	M	78
12	GT	3	(United States) Corvette Racing	(Denmark) Jan Magnussen (Spain) Antonio García	Chevrolet Corvette C6.R	M	78
12	GT	3	(United States) Corvette Racing	(Denmark) Jan Magnussen (Spain) Antonio García	Chevrolet 5.5 L V8	M	78
13	GT	48	(United States) Paul Miller Racing	(United States) Bryce Miller (Germany) Marco Holzer	Porsche 997 GT3-RSR	M	78
13	GT	48	(United States) Paul Miller Racing	(United States) Bryce Miller (Germany) Marco Holzer	Porsche 4.0 L Flat-6	M	78
14	GT	23	(United States) Team West/AJR/Boardwalk Ferrari	(United States) Townsend Bell (United States) Bill Sweedler	Ferrari 458 Italia GT2	Y	77
14	GT	23	(United States) Team West/AJR/Boardwalk Ferrari	(United States) Townsend Bell (United States) Bill Sweedler	Ferrari 4.5 L V8	Y	77
15	GT	93	(United States) SRT Motorsports	(Canada) Kuno Wittmer (United States) Jonathan Bomarito	SRT Viper GTS-R	M	77
15	GT	93	(United States) SRT Motorsports	(Canada) Kuno Wittmer (United States) Jonathan Bomarito	SRT 8.0 L V10	M	77
16	GT	62	(United States) Risi Competizione	(Monaco) Olivier Beretta (Italy) Matteo Malucelli	Ferrari 458 Italia GT2	M	77
16	GT	62	(United States) Risi Competizione	(Monaco) Olivier Beretta (Italy) Matteo Malucelli	Ferrari 4.5 L V8	M	77
17	PC	7	(United States) BAR1 Motorsports	(United States) Tomy Drissi (United States) Rusty Mitchell	Oreca FLM09	C	77
17	PC	7	(United States) BAR1 Motorsports	(United States) Tomy Drissi (United States) Rusty Mitchell	Chevrolet 6.2 L V8	C	77
18	PC	18	(United States) Performance Tech Motorsports	(United States) Tristan Nunez (United States) Charlie Shears	Oreca FLM09	C	76
18	PC	18	(United States) Performance Tech Motorsports	(United States) Tristan Nunez (United States) Charlie Shears	Chevrolet 6.2 L V8	C	76
19	GT	17	(United States) Team Falken Tire	(United States) Bryan Sellers (Germany) Wolf Henzler	Porsche 997 GT3-RSR	F	76
19	GT	17	(United States) Team Falken Tire	(United States) Bryan Sellers (Germany) Wolf Henzler	Porsche 4.0 L Flat-6	F	76
20	**GTC**	**30**	**(United States) NGT Motorsport**	**(United States) Henrique Cisneros (United Kingdom) Sean Edwards**	**Porsche 997 GT3 Cup**	Y	**75**
20	**GTC**	**30**	**(United States) NGT Motorsport**	**(United States) Henrique Cisneros (United Kingdom) Sean Edwards**	**Porsche 4.0 L Flat-6**	Y	**75**
21	GTC	45	(United States) Flying Lizard Motorsports	(United States) Spencer Pumpelly (Venezuela) Nelson Canache Jr.	Porsche 997 GT3 Cup	Y	75
21	GTC	45	(United States) Flying Lizard Motorsports	(United States) Spencer Pumpelly (Venezuela) Nelson Canache Jr.	Porsche 4.0 L Flat-6	Y	75
22	GTC	44	(United States) Flying Lizard Motorsports	(United States) David Wong (South Africa) Dion von Moltke (United States) Spencer Pumpelly	Porsche 997 GT3 Cup	Y	75
22	GTC	44	(United States) Flying Lizard Motorsports	(United States) David Wong (South Africa) Dion von Moltke (United States) Spencer Pumpelly	Porsche 4.0 L Flat-6	Y	75
23	GTC	22	(United States) Alex Job Racing	(United States) Cooper MacNeil (Netherlands) Jeroen Bleekemolen	Porsche 997 GT3 Cup	Y	75
23	GTC	22	(United States) Alex Job Racing	(United States) Cooper MacNeil (Netherlands) Jeroen Bleekemolen	Porsche 4.0 L Flat-6	Y	75
24	GTC	68	(United States) TRG	(United States) Bret Curtis (United States) Craig Stanton	Porsche 997 GT3 Cup	Y	75
24	GTC	68	(United States) TRG	(United States) Bret Curtis (United States) Craig Stanton	Porsche 4.0 L Flat-6	Y	75
25	PC	8	(United States) BAR1 Motorsports	(Canada) Kyle Marcelli (Canada) Chris Cumming	Oreca FLM09	C	75
25	PC	8	(United States) BAR1 Motorsports	(Canada) Kyle Marcelli (Canada) Chris Cumming	Chevrolet 6.2 L V8	C	75
26	GTC	27	(United States) Dempsey Del Piero Racing	(United States) Patrick Dempsey (United States) Joe Foster	Porsche 997 GT3 Cup	Y	73
26	GTC	27	(United States) Dempsey Del Piero Racing	(United States) Patrick Dempsey (United States) Joe Foster	Porsche 4.0 L Flat-6	Y	73
27	GTC	66	(United States) TRG	(United States) Ben Keating (Republic of Ireland) Damien Faulkner	Porsche 997 GT3 Cup	Y	73
27	GTC	66	(United States) TRG	(United States) Ben Keating (Republic of Ireland) Damien Faulkner	Porsche 4.0 L Flat-6	Y	73
28	P2	551	(United States) Level 5 Motorsports	(United States) Scott Tucker (Australia) Ryan Briscoe	HPD ARX-03b	M	66
28	P2	551	(United States) Level 5 Motorsports	(United States) Scott Tucker (Australia) Ryan Briscoe	Honda HR28TT 2.8 L Turbo V6	M	66
29	GTC	11	(United States) JDX Racing	(United States) Mike Hedlund (Belgium) Jan Heylen	Porsche 997 GT3 Cup	Y	62
29	GTC	11	(United States) JDX Racing	(United States) Mike Hedlund (Belgium) Jan Heylen	Porsche 4.0 L Flat-6	Y	62
30	P2	552	(United States) Level 5 Motorsports	(United States) Scott Tucker (United Kingdom) Marino Franchitti	HPD ARX-03b	M	57
30	P2	552	(United States) Level 5 Motorsports	(United States) Scott Tucker (United Kingdom) Marino Franchitti	Honda HR28TT 2.8 L Turbo V6	M	57
DNF	P1	16	(United States) Dyson Racing Team	(United States) Chris Dyson (United Kingdom) Guy Smith	Lola B12/60	M	17
DNF	P1	16	(United States) Dyson Racing Team	(United States) Chris Dyson (United Kingdom) Guy Smith	Mazda MZR-R 2.0 L Turbo I4 (Butanol)	M	17
DNF	GTC	99	(United States) Competition Motorsports	(Australia) David Calvert-Jones (United States) Ted Ballou	Porsche 997 GT3 Cup	Y	6
DNF	GTC	99	(United States) Competition Motorsports	(Australia) David Calvert-Jones (United States) Ted Ballou	Porsche 4.0 L Flat-6	Y	6
DNF	GTC	10	(United States) Dempsey Del Piero Racing	(United States) Michael Avenatti (United States) Bob Faieta	Porsche 997 GT3 Cup	Y	5
DNF	GTC	10	(United States) Dempsey Del Piero Racing	(United States) Michael Avenatti (United States) Bob Faieta	Porsche 4.0 L Flat-6	Y	5

American Le Mans Series
Previous race: 12 Hours of Sebring	2013 season	Next race: American Le Mans Monterey
