= 2012 Road Race Showcase =

Track map of Road America.

The 2012 Road America Road Race Showcase was a multi-class sports car and GT motor race held at Road America in Wisconsin, United States on August 18, 2012. It was the seventh round of the 2012 American Le Mans Series season and the 45th race in the combined history of sportscar races associated with the Road America 500. The race was held over a four-hour period, during which 101 laps of the 6.5-kilometer circuit were completed for a race distance of 658 kilometers.

A year after Muscle Milk Pickett Racing team had beaten the Dyson Racing Team by less than 0.2 seconds, Dyson Racing Team beat the Muscle Milk team by less than 0.1 seconds, giving Dyson Racing Team its first victory at Road America. Lucas Luhr in the Muscle Milke HPD ARX-03a overtook Guy Smith's Lola B12/60 at the final corner of the race only for Smith to win the drag race to the finish line. It was Chris Dyson and Guy Smith's first victory at Road America. Dyson and Smith had overcome a rear of grid start after missing qualifying due to gearbox failure. Dyson Racing Team's second Lola-Mazda of Michael Marsal, Eric Lux and Tony Burgess finished in third place behind Luhr and Klaus Graf.

The season's first championship was decided in Prototype Challenge. When Alex Popow, Tom Kimber-Smith and Jon Bennett won the class in fifth position outright, CORE Autosport secured the teams championship in Prototype Challenge. Just ahead of them in fourth place were the P2 class winners, Conquest Endurance's Martin Plowman and David Heinemeier Hansson in their Morgan LMP2. It was their second class win, and the team's biggest victory to date.

Thirteenth outright was the best of the GTs. BMW Team RLL took their second win of the year with Bill Auberlen and Jörg Müller joining their BMW M3-equipped teammates as winners in 2012. Second was Porsche team Flying Lizard Motorsports of Jörg Bergmeister and Patrick Long with Extreme Speed Motorsports Ferrari of Scott Sharp and Johannes van Overbeek.

GT Challenge was claimed when the Alex Job Racing Porsche of Cooper MacNeil and Leh Keen crossed the line in 25th position.

31 of the 35 entries were running at the race's conclusion.

== Race result ==
Class winners are in bold. Cars failing to complete 70% of their class winner's distance are marked as Not Classified (NC).

Pos	Class	No	Team	Drivers	Chassis	Tire	Laps
Pos	Class	No	Team	Drivers	Engine	Tire	Laps
1	**P1**	**16**	**(United States) Dyson Racing Team**	**(United States) Chris Dyson (United Kingdom) Guy Smith**	**Lola B12/60**	D	**101**
1	**P1**	**16**	**(United States) Dyson Racing Team**	**(United States) Chris Dyson (United Kingdom) Guy Smith**	**Mazda MZR-R 2.0 L Turbo I4 (Isobutanol)**	D	**101**
2	P1	6	(United States) Muscle Milk Pickett Racing	(Germany) Lucas Luhr (Germany) Klaus Graf	HPD ARX-03a	MI	101
2	P1	6	(United States) Muscle Milk Pickett Racing	(Germany) Lucas Luhr (Germany) Klaus Graf	Honda LM-V8 3.4 L V8	MI	101
3	P1	20	(United States) Dyson Racing Team	(United States) Michael Marsal (United States) Eric Lux (Canada) Tony Burgess	Lola B11/66	D	101
3	P1	20	(United States) Dyson Racing Team	(United States) Michael Marsal (United States) Eric Lux (Canada) Tony Burgess	Mazda MZR-R 2.0 L Turbo I4 (Isobutanol)	D	101
4	**P2**	**37**	**(United States) Conquest Endurance**	**(United Kingdom) Martin Plowman (Denmark) David Heinemeier Hansson**	**Morgan LMP2**	D	**101**
4	**P2**	**37**	**(United States) Conquest Endurance**	**(United Kingdom) Martin Plowman (Denmark) David Heinemeier Hansson**	**Nissan VK45DE 4.5 L V8**	D	**101**
5	**PC**	**06**	**(United States) CORE Autosport**	**(Venezuela) Alex Popow (United Kingdom) Tom Kimber-Smith (United States) Jon Bennett**	**Oreca FLM09**	MI	**100**
5	**PC**	**06**	**(United States) CORE Autosport**	**(Venezuela) Alex Popow (United Kingdom) Tom Kimber-Smith (United States) Jon Bennett**	**Chevrolet LS3 6.2 L V8**	MI	**100**
6	PC	05	(United States) CORE Autosport	(United States) Jon Bennett (United States) Colin Braun	Oreca FLM09	MI	100
6	PC	05	(United States) CORE Autosport	(United States) Jon Bennett (United States) Colin Braun	Chevrolet LS3 6.2 L V8	MI	100
7	PC	8	(United States) Merchant Services Racing	(Canada) Kyle Marcelli (United States) Chapman Ducote (United States) James French	Oreca FLM09	MI	100
7	PC	8	(United States) Merchant Services Racing	(Canada) Kyle Marcelli (United States) Chapman Ducote (United States) James French	Chevrolet LS3 6.2 L V8	MI	100
8	PC	9	(United States) RSR Racing	(Brazil) Bruno Junqueira (Mexico) Roberto González	Oreca FLM09	MI	100
8	PC	9	(United States) RSR Racing	(Brazil) Bruno Junqueira (Mexico) Roberto González	Chevrolet LS3 6.2 L V8	MI	100
9	P2	27	(United States) Dempsey Racing	(United States) Patrick Dempsey (United States) Joe Foster (United Kingdom) Ben Devlin	Lola B12/87	MI	99
9	P2	27	(United States) Dempsey Racing	(United States) Patrick Dempsey (United States) Joe Foster (United Kingdom) Ben Devlin	Judd-BMW HK 3.6 L V8	MI	99
10	PC	25	(United States) Dempsey Racing	(France) Henri Richard (United States) Duncan Ende	Oreca FLM09	MI	99
10	PC	25	(United States) Dempsey Racing	(France) Henri Richard (United States) Duncan Ende	Chevrolet LS3 6.2 L V8	MI	99
11	P2	055	(United States) Level 5 Motorsports	(United States) Scott Tucker (France) Christophe Bouchut	HPD ARX-03b	D	99
11	P2	055	(United States) Level 5 Motorsports	(United States) Scott Tucker (France) Christophe Bouchut	Honda HR28TT 2.8 L Turbo V6	D	99
12	P2	95	(United States) Level 5 Motorsports	(United States) Scott Tucker (Mexico) Luis Díaz	HPD ARX-03b	D	98
12	P2	95	(United States) Level 5 Motorsports	(United States) Scott Tucker (Mexico) Luis Díaz	Honda HR28TT 2.8 L Turbo V6	D	98
13	**GT**	**55**	**(United States) BMW Team RLL**	**(Germany) Jörg Müller (United States) Bill Auberlen**	**BMW M3 GT2**	D	**97**
13	**GT**	**55**	**(United States) BMW Team RLL**	**(Germany) Jörg Müller (United States) Bill Auberlen**	**BMW 4.0 L V8**	D	**97**
14	GT	45	(United States) Flying Lizard Motorsports	(Germany) Jörg Bergmeister (United States) Patrick Long	Porsche 997 GT3-RSR	MI	97
14	GT	45	(United States) Flying Lizard Motorsports	(Germany) Jörg Bergmeister (United States) Patrick Long	Porsche 4.0 L Flat-6	MI	97
15	GT	01	(United States) Extreme Speed Motorsports	(United States) Scott Sharp (United States) Johannes van Overbeek	Ferrari 458 Italia GT2	MI	97
15	GT	01	(United States) Extreme Speed Motorsports	(United States) Scott Sharp (United States) Johannes van Overbeek	Ferrari 4.5 L V8	MI	97
16	GT	4	(United States) Corvette Racing	(United Kingdom) Oliver Gavin (United States) Tommy Milner	Chevrolet Corvette C6.R	MI	97
16	GT	4	(United States) Corvette Racing	(United Kingdom) Oliver Gavin (United States) Tommy Milner	Chevrolet 5.5 L V8	MI	97
17	PC	7	(United States) Merchant Services Racing	(United States) Antonio Downs (United States) Lucas Downs (United States) Matt Downs	Oreca FLM09	MI	97
17	PC	7	(United States) Merchant Services Racing	(United States) Antonio Downs (United States) Lucas Downs (United States) Matt Downs	Chevrolet LS3 6.2 L V8	MI	97
18	GT	48	(United States) Paul Miller Racing	(United States) Bryce Miller (Germany) Sascha Maassen	Porsche 997 GT3-RSR	D	97
18	GT	48	(United States) Paul Miller Racing	(United States) Bryce Miller (Germany) Sascha Maassen	Porsche 4.0 L Flat-6	D	97
19	GT	3	(United States) Corvette Racing	(Denmark) Jan Magnussen (Spain) Antonio García	Chevrolet Corvette C6.R	MI	97
19	GT	3	(United States) Corvette Racing	(Denmark) Jan Magnussen (Spain) Antonio García	Chevrolet 5.5 L V8	MI	97
20	GT	23	(United States) Lotus / Alex Job Racing	(United States) Bill Sweedler (United States) Townsend Bell	Lotus Evora GTE	Y	97
20	GT	23	(United States) Lotus / Alex Job Racing	(United States) Bill Sweedler (United States) Townsend Bell	Toyota-Cosworth 3.5 L V6	Y	97
21	GT	44	(United States) Flying Lizard Motorsports	(United States) Seth Neiman (Germany) Marco Holzer	Porsche 997 GT3-RSR	MI	96
21	GT	44	(United States) Flying Lizard Motorsports	(United States) Seth Neiman (Germany) Marco Holzer	Porsche 4.0 L Flat-6	MI	96
22	GT	91	(United States) SRT Motorsports	(Canada) Kuno Wittmer (Germany) Dominik Farnbacher	SRT Viper GTS-R	MI	96
22	GT	91	(United States) SRT Motorsports	(Canada) Kuno Wittmer (Germany) Dominik Farnbacher	Dodge 8.0 L V10	MI	96
23 DNF	GT	56	(United States) BMW Team RLL	(United States) Joey Hand (United States) Jonathan Summerton	BMW M3 GT2	D	95
23 DNF	GT	56	(United States) BMW Team RLL	(United States) Joey Hand (United States) Jonathan Summerton	BMW 4.0 L V8	D	95
24	GT	02	(United States) Extreme Speed Motorsports	(United States) Ed Brown (United States) Guy Cosmo (United States) Anthony Lazzaro	Ferrari 458 Italia GT2	MI	95
24	GT	02	(United States) Extreme Speed Motorsports	(United States) Ed Brown (United States) Guy Cosmo (United States) Anthony Lazzaro	Ferrari 4.5 L V8	MI	95
25	**GTC**	**22**	**(United States) Alex Job Racing**	**(United States) Cooper MacNeil (United States) Leh Keen**	**Porsche 997 GT3 Cup**	Y	**93**
25	**GTC**	**22**	**(United States) Alex Job Racing**	**(United States) Cooper MacNeil (United States) Leh Keen**	**Porsche 4.0 L Flat-6**	Y	**93**
26	GTC	11	(United States) JDX Racing	(United States) Tim Pappas (Netherlands) Jeroen Bleekemolen	Porsche 997 GT3 Cup	Y	93
26	GTC	11	(United States) JDX Racing	(United States) Tim Pappas (Netherlands) Jeroen Bleekemolen	Porsche 4.0 L Flat-6	Y	93
27	GTC	34	(United States) Green Hornet Racing	(United States) Peter LeSaffre (Republic of Ireland) Damien Faulkner	Porsche 997 GT3 Cup	Y	93
27	GTC	34	(United States) Green Hornet Racing	(United States) Peter LeSaffre (Republic of Ireland) Damien Faulkner	Porsche 4.0 L Flat-6	Y	93
28	GTC	24	(United States) Competition Motorsports	(United States) Bob Faieta (United States) Michael Avenatti	Porsche 997 GT3 Cup	Y	93
28	GTC	24	(United States) Competition Motorsports	(United States) Bob Faieta (United States) Michael Avenatti	Porsche 3.8 L Flat-6	Y	93
29	GTC	32	(United States) GMG Racing	(United States) James Sofronas (United States) Alex Welch (United States) René Villeneuve	Porsche 997 GT3 Cup	Y	93
29	GTC	32	(United States) GMG Racing	(United States) James Sofronas (United States) Alex Welch (United States) René Villeneuve	Porsche 3.8 L Flat-6	Y	93
30	GTC	33	(United States) Green Hornet Racing	(Netherlands) Patrick Huisman (United States) Brian Wong	Porsche 997 GT3 Cup	Y	91
30	GTC	33	(United States) Green Hornet Racing	(Netherlands) Patrick Huisman (United States) Brian Wong	Porsche 4.0 L Flat-6	Y	91
31 DNF	GT	17	(United States) Team Falken Tire	(Germany) Wolf Henzler (United States) Bryan Sellers	Porsche 997 GT3-RSR	FAL	75
31 DNF	GT	17	(United States) Team Falken Tire	(Germany) Wolf Henzler (United States) Bryan Sellers	Porsche 4.0 L Flat-6	FAL	75
32	GTC	31	(United States) NGT Motorsport	(Venezuela) Angel Benitez, Sr. (Venezuela) Angel Benitez, Jr.	Porsche 997 GT3 Cup	Y	71
32	GTC	31	(United States) NGT Motorsport	(Venezuela) Angel Benitez, Sr. (Venezuela) Angel Benitez, Jr.	Porsche 3.8 L Flat-6	Y	71
33	GTC	66	(United States) TRG	(Venezuela) Emilio Di Guida (United States) Spencer Pumpelly	Porsche 997 GT3 Cup	Y	69
33	GTC	66	(United States) TRG	(Venezuela) Emilio Di Guida (United States) Spencer Pumpelly	Porsche 4.0 L Flat-6	Y	69
34 DNF	GT	93	(United States) SRT Motorsports	(Belgium) Marc Goossens (United States) Tommy Kendall	SRT Viper GTS-R	MI	45
34 DNF	GT	93	(United States) SRT Motorsports	(Belgium) Marc Goossens (United States) Tommy Kendall	Dodge 8.0 L V10	MI	45
35 DNF	PC	52	(United States) PR1/Mathiasan Motorsports	(Mexico) Rudy Junco, Jr. (United Kingdom) Marino Franchitti	Oreca FLM09	MI	23
35 DNF	PC	52	(United States) PR1/Mathiasan Motorsports	(Mexico) Rudy Junco, Jr. (United Kingdom) Marino Franchitti	Chevrolet LS3 6.2 L V8	MI	23

American Le Mans Series
Previous race: Mid-Ohio Sports Car Challenge	2012 season	Next race: Baltimore Sportscar Challenge
