= 2013 Northeast Grand Prix =

Track map of Lime Rock Park

The 2013 American Le Mans Northeast Grand Prix was an auto racing event held at Lime Rock Park, Lakeville, Connecticut, on July 5–6, 2013, and was the fourth round of the 2013 American Le Mans Series season. Muscle Milk Pickett Racing and their drivers Lucas Luhr and Klaus Graf earned their third consecutive victory of the season after Dyson Racing fell back. Level 5 Motorsports' Scott Tucker and Ryan Briscoe overcame an incident with Extreme Speed Motorsports in the P2 category to take the victory, but were later penalized championship points for the maneuver. RSR Racing earned their first victory in the PC class in 2013. BMW's John Edwards and Dirk Müller won the GT category, while Flying Lizard Motorsports scored their first win in the GTC category.

== Background ==
=== Preview ===
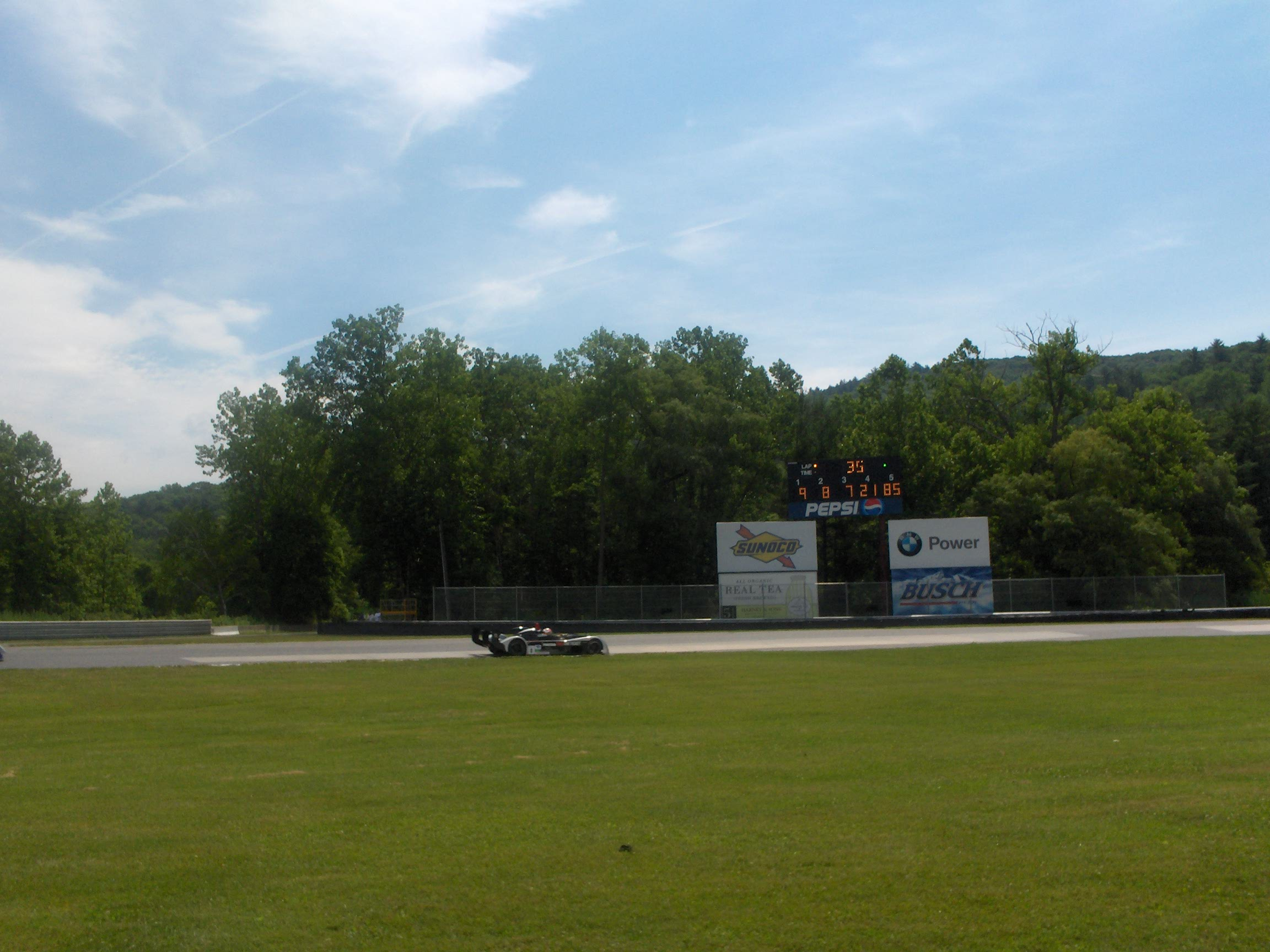
Lime Rock Park, where the race was held.

American Le Mans Series (ALMS) president Scott Atherton confirmed the race was part of the schedule for the 2013 American Le Mans Series schedule in October 2012. It was the tenth consecutive year the event was held as part of the American Le Mans Series. The 2013 American Le Mans Northeast Grand Prix was the fifth of ten scheduled sports car races of 2013 American Le Mans Series. The race was held at the seven-turn 1.530 mi (2.462 km) Lime Rock Park in Lakeville, Connecticut on July 6, 2013.

Before the race, Klaus Graf and Lucas Luhr led the P1 Drivers' Championship with 62 points, 4 ahead of Nick Heidfeld and Neel Jani. With 59 points, Scott Tucker led the P2 Drivers' Championship over Marino Franchitti by 3 points. In PC, Mike Guasch led the Drivers' Championship with 62 points, ahead of Colin Braun. Dirk Müller led the GT Drivers' Championship with 42 points, 3 points ahead of Oliver Gavin and Tommy Milner. With 59 points, Henrique Cisneros led the GTC Drivers' Championship, ahead of Jeroen Bleekemolen and Cooper MacNeil.

== Qualifying ==
=== Qualifying result ===
Pole position winners in each class are marked in bold.

Pos	Class	Team	Driver	Lap Time	Grid
1	**P1**	**#6 Muscle Milk Pickett Racing**	**Lucas Luhr**	**0:44.396**	1
2	P1	#16 Dyson Racing Team	Chris Dyson	0:45.243	2
3	**P2**	**#551 Level 5 Motorsports**	**Ryan Briscoe**	**0:46.191**	3
4	P2	#552 Level 5 Motorsports	Marino Franchitti	0:46.428	4
5	P2	#02 Extreme Speed Motorsports	Johannes van Overbeek	0:46.729	5
6	P2	#01 Extreme Speed Motorsports	Scott Sharp	0:46.870	6
7	**PC**	**#05 CORE Autosport**	**Colin Braun**	**0:48.078**	7
8	PC	#9 RSR Racing	Bruno Junqueira	0:48.188	8
9	PC	#8 BAR1 Motorsports	Kyle Marcelli	0:48.403	9
10	PC	#81 8 Star Mushimotors	Renger van der Zande	0:48.422	10
11	PC	#18 Performance Tech Motorsports	Tristan Nunez	0:48.564	11
12	P1	#0 DeltaWing Racing Cars	Andy Meyrick	0:48.931	12
13	PC	#52 PR1 Mathiasen Motorsports	Mike Guasch	0:49.222	13
14	PC	#7 BAR1 Motorsports	Rusty Mitchell	0:50.044	14
15	**GT**	**#56 BMW Team RLL**	**John Edwards**	**0:50.996**	15
16	GT	#55 BMW Team RLL	Maxime Martin	0:51.157	16
17	GT	#4 Corvette Racing	Oliver Gavin	0:51.490	17
18	GT	#62 Risi Competizione	Olivier Beretta	0:51.499	18
19	GT	#3 Corvette Racing	Antonio García	0:51.537	19
20	GT	#06 CORE Autosport	Patrick Long	0:51.732	20
21	GT	#23 Team West/AJR/Boardwalk Ferrari	Townsend Bell	0:51.812	21
22	GT	#91 SRT Motorsports	Dominik Farnbacher	0:51.916	22
23	GT	#93 SRT Motorsports	Kuno Wittmer	0:52.185	23
24	GT	#17 Team Falken Tire	Bryan Sellers	0:52.199	33^{1}
25	GT	#48 Paul Miller Racing	Bryce Miller	0:52.254	24
26	**GTC**	**#45 Flying Lizard Motorsports**	**Spencer Pumpelly**	**0:55.155**	25
27	GTC	#22 Alex Job Racing	Jeroen Bleekemolen	0:55.317	26
28	GTC	#66 TRG	Damien Faulkner	0:55.414	27
29	GTC	#27 Dempsey Del Piero Racing	Andy Lally	0:55.500	28
30	GTC	#11 JDX Racing	Jan Heylen	0:55.604	29
31	GTC	#30 NGT Motorsport	Nicolas Armindo	0:55.677	30
32	GTC	#44 Flying Lizard Motorsports	Dion von Moltke	0:55.744	31
33	GTC	#68 TRG	Craig Stanton	0:55.992	32

- – The #17 Team Falken Tire Porsche was moved to the back of the grid for changing a tire between qualifying and the race.

== Race ==
=== Race result ===
Class winners in bold. Cars failing to complete 70% of their class winner's distance are marked as Not Classified (NC).

Pos	Class	No	Team	Drivers	Chassis	Tire	Laps
Pos	Class	No	Team	Drivers	Engine	Tire	Laps
1	**P1**	**6**	**(United States) Muscle Milk Pickett Racing**	**(Germany) Klaus Graf (Germany) Lucas Luhr**	**HPD ARX-03a**	M	**184**
1	**P1**	**6**	**(United States) Muscle Milk Pickett Racing**	**(Germany) Klaus Graf (Germany) Lucas Luhr**	**Honda 3.4 L V8**	M	**184**
2	P1	16	(United States) Dyson Racing Team	(United States) Chris Dyson (United Kingdom) Guy Smith	Lola B12/60	M	178
2	P1	16	(United States) Dyson Racing Team	(United States) Chris Dyson (United Kingdom) Guy Smith	Mazda MZR-R 2.0 L Turbo I4 (Butanol)	M	178
3^{2}	**P2**	**551**	**(United States) Level 5 Motorsports**	**(United States) Scott Tucker (Australia) Ryan Briscoe**	**HPD ARX-03b**	M	**178**
3^{2}	**P2**	**551**	**(United States) Level 5 Motorsports**	**(United States) Scott Tucker (Australia) Ryan Briscoe**	**Honda HR28TT 2.8 L Turbo V6**	M	**178**
4	P2	01	(United States) Extreme Speed Motorsports	(United States) Scott Sharp (United States) Guy Cosmo	HPD ARX-03b	M	178
4	P2	01	(United States) Extreme Speed Motorsports	(United States) Scott Sharp (United States) Guy Cosmo	Honda HR28TT 2.8 L Turbo V6	M	178
5	**PC**	**9**	**(United States) RSR Racing**	**(Brazil) Bruno Junqueira (United States) Duncan Ende**	**Oreca FLM09**	C	**177**
5	**PC**	**9**	**(United States) RSR Racing**	**(Brazil) Bruno Junqueira (United States) Duncan Ende**	**Chevrolet 6.2 L V8**	C	**177**
6	PC	05	(United States) CORE Autosport	(United States) Jon Bennett (United States) Colin Braun	Oreca FLM09	C	177
6	PC	05	(United States) CORE Autosport	(United States) Jon Bennett (United States) Colin Braun	Chevrolet 6.2 L V8	C	177
7	P2	552	(United States) Level 5 Motorsports	(United States) Scott Tucker (United Kingdom) Marino Franchitti	HPD ARX-03b	M	176
7	P2	552	(United States) Level 5 Motorsports	(United States) Scott Tucker (United Kingdom) Marino Franchitti	Honda HR28TT 2.8 L Turbo V6	M	176
8	PC	18	(United States) Performance Tech Motorsports	(United States) Tristan Nunez (United States) Ryan Booth	Oreca FLM09	C	176
8	PC	18	(United States) Performance Tech Motorsports	(United States) Tristan Nunez (United States) Ryan Booth	Chevrolet 6.2 L V8	C	176
9	P2	02	(United States) Extreme Speed Motorsports	(United States) Ed Brown (United States) Johannes van Overbeek	HPD ARX-03b	M	176
9	P2	02	(United States) Extreme Speed Motorsports	(United States) Ed Brown (United States) Johannes van Overbeek	Honda HR28TT 2.8 L Turbo V6	M	176
10	PC	8	(United States) BAR1 Motorsports	(Canada) Kyle Marcelli (Canada) Chris Cumming	Oreca FLM09	C	175
10	PC	8	(United States) BAR1 Motorsports	(Canada) Kyle Marcelli (Canada) Chris Cumming	Chevrolet 6.2 L V8	C	175
11	PC	81	(United States) 8 Star Mishumotors	(Germany) Mirco Schultis (Netherlands) Renger van der Zande	Oreca FLM09	C	174
11	PC	81	(United States) 8 Star Mishumotors	(Germany) Mirco Schultis (Netherlands) Renger van der Zande	Chevrolet 6.2 L V8	C	174
12	PC	52	(United States) PR1 Mathiasen Motorsports	(United States) David Cheng (United States) Mike Guasch	Oreca FLM09	C	172
12	PC	52	(United States) PR1 Mathiasen Motorsports	(United States) David Cheng (United States) Mike Guasch	Chevrolet 6.2 L V8	C	172
13	**GT**	**56**	**(United States) BMW Team RLL**	**(United States) John Edwards (Germany) Dirk Müller**	**BMW Z4 GTE**	M	**172**
13	**GT**	**56**	**(United States) BMW Team RLL**	**(United States) John Edwards (Germany) Dirk Müller**	**BMW 4.4 L V8**	M	**172**
14	GT	3	(United States) Corvette Racing	(Denmark) Jan Magnussen (Spain) Antonio García	Chevrolet Corvette C6.R	M	172
14	GT	3	(United States) Corvette Racing	(Denmark) Jan Magnussen (Spain) Antonio García	Chevrolet 5.5 L V8	M	172
15	GT	06	(United States) CORE Autosport	(United States) Patrick Long (United Kingdom) Tom Kimber-Smith	Porsche 997 GT3-RSR	M	172
15	GT	06	(United States) CORE Autosport	(United States) Patrick Long (United Kingdom) Tom Kimber-Smith	Porsche 4.0 L Flat-6	M	172
16	GT	55	(United States) BMW Team RLL	(United States) Bill Auberlen (Belgium) Maxime Martin	BMW Z4 GTE	M	171
16	GT	55	(United States) BMW Team RLL	(United States) Bill Auberlen (Belgium) Maxime Martin	BMW 4.4 L V8	M	171
17	GT	93	(United States) SRT Motorsports	(Canada) Kuno Wittmer (United States) Jonathan Bomarito	SRT Viper GTS-R	M	171
17	GT	93	(United States) SRT Motorsports	(Canada) Kuno Wittmer (United States) Jonathan Bomarito	SRT 8.0 L V10	M	171
18	GT	4	(United States) Corvette Racing	(United Kingdom) Oliver Gavin (United States) Tommy Milner	Chevrolet Corvette C6.R	M	171
18	GT	4	(United States) Corvette Racing	(United Kingdom) Oliver Gavin (United States) Tommy Milner	Chevrolet 5.5 L V8	M	171
19	PC	7	(United States) BAR1 Motorsports	(United States) Tomy Drissi (United States) Rusty Mitchell	Oreca FLM09	C	170
19	PC	7	(United States) BAR1 Motorsports	(United States) Tomy Drissi (United States) Rusty Mitchell	Chevrolet 6.2 L V8	C	170
20	GT	48	(United States) Paul Miller Racing	(United States) Bryce Miller (Germany) Marco Holzer	Porsche 997 GT3-RSR	M	169
20	GT	48	(United States) Paul Miller Racing	(United States) Bryce Miller (Germany) Marco Holzer	Porsche 4.0 L Flat-6	M	169
21	GT	17	(United States) Team Falken Tire	(United States) Bryan Sellers (Germany) Wolf Henzler	Porsche 997 GT3-RSR	F	169
21	GT	17	(United States) Team Falken Tire	(United States) Bryan Sellers (Germany) Wolf Henzler	Porsche 4.0 L Flat-6	F	169
22	GT	23	(United States) Team West/AJR/Boardwalk Ferrari	(United States) Townsend Bell (United States) Bill Sweedler	Ferrari 458 Italia GT2	Y	168
22	GT	23	(United States) Team West/AJR/Boardwalk Ferrari	(United States) Townsend Bell (United States) Bill Sweedler	Ferrari 4.5 L V8	Y	168
23^{2} DNF	GT	62	(United States) Risi Competizione	(Monaco) Olivier Beretta (Italy) Matteo Malucelli	Ferrari 458 Italia GT2	M	165
23^{2} DNF	GT	62	(United States) Risi Competizione	(Monaco) Olivier Beretta (Italy) Matteo Malucelli	Ferrari 4.5 L V8	M	165
24	**GTC**	**45**	**(United States) Flying Lizard Motorsports**	**(United States) Spencer Pumpelly (Venezuela) Nelson Canache, Jr.**	**Porsche 997 GT3 Cup**	Y	**164**
24	**GTC**	**45**	**(United States) Flying Lizard Motorsports**	**(United States) Spencer Pumpelly (Venezuela) Nelson Canache, Jr.**	**Porsche 4.0 L Flat-6**	Y	**164**
25	GTC	11	(United States) JDX Racing	(United States) Mike Hedlund (Belgium) Jan Heylen	Porsche 997 GT3 Cup	Y	162
25	GTC	11	(United States) JDX Racing	(United States) Mike Hedlund (Belgium) Jan Heylen	Porsche 4.0 L Flat-6	Y	162
26	GTC	66	(United States) TRG	(United States) Ben Keating (Republic of Ireland) Damien Faulkner	Porsche 997 GT3 Cup	Y	161
26	GTC	66	(United States) TRG	(United States) Ben Keating (Republic of Ireland) Damien Faulkner	Porsche 4.0 L Flat-6	Y	161
27	GTC	68	(United States) TRG	(Canada) David Ostella (United States) Craig Stanton	Porsche 997 GT3 Cup	Y	161
27	GTC	68	(United States) TRG	(Canada) David Ostella (United States) Craig Stanton	Porsche 4.0 L Flat-6	Y	161
28 DNF	GTC	22	(United States) Alex Job Racing	(United States) Cooper MacNeil (Netherlands) Jeroen Bleekemolen	Porsche 997 GT3 Cup	Y	159
28 DNF	GTC	22	(United States) Alex Job Racing	(United States) Cooper MacNeil (Netherlands) Jeroen Bleekemolen	Porsche 4.0 L Flat-6	Y	159
29	GTC	44	(United States) Flying Lizard Motorsports	(United States) Seth Neiman (South Africa) Dion von Moltke	Porsche 997 GT3 Cup	Y	159
29	GTC	44	(United States) Flying Lizard Motorsports	(United States) Seth Neiman (South Africa) Dion von Moltke	Porsche 4.0 L Flat-6	Y	159
30	GTC	27	(United States) Dempsey Del Piero Racing	(United States) Patrick Dempsey (United States) Andy Lally	Porsche 997 GT3 Cup	Y	158
30	GTC	27	(United States) Dempsey Del Piero Racing	(United States) Patrick Dempsey (United States) Andy Lally	Porsche 4.0 L Flat-6	Y	158
31 DNF	GTC	30	(United States) NGT Motorsport	(United States) Henrique Cisneros (France) Nicolas Armindo	Porsche 997 GT3 Cup	Y	145
31 DNF	GTC	30	(United States) NGT Motorsport	(United States) Henrique Cisneros (France) Nicolas Armindo	Porsche 4.0 L Flat-6	Y	145
32 DNF	P1	0	(United States) DeltaWing Racing Cars	(United Kingdom) Katherine Legge (United Kingdom) Andy Meyrick	DeltaWing LM12	B	102
32 DNF	P1	0	(United States) DeltaWing Racing Cars	(United Kingdom) Katherine Legge (United Kingdom) Andy Meyrick	Élan 1.9 L Turbo I4	B	102
33 DNF	GT	91	(United States) SRT Motorsports	(Belgium) Marc Goossens (Germany) Dominik Farnbacher	SRT Viper GTS-R	M	25
33 DNF	GT	91	(United States) SRT Motorsports	(Belgium) Marc Goossens (Germany) Dominik Farnbacher	SRT 8.0 L V10	M	25

- **^2** – The #551 Level 5 HPD-Honda and #62 Risi Competizione Ferrari were both penalized with post-race stop and go penalties plus sixty seconds for avoidable contact. The #551 was allowed to keep its finishing position in the race but its time penalty was applied in the awarding of championship points, demoting Level 5 to second place.

American Le Mans Series
Previous race: American Le Mans Monterey	2013 season	Next race: SportsCar Grand Prix
