= 2012 American Le Mans Monterey =

Track map of Mazda Raceway Laguna Seca

The 2012 American Le Mans Monterey presented by Patrón was held at Mazda Raceway Laguna Seca on May 12, 2012. It was the third round of the 2012 American Le Mans Series season.

== Qualifying ==
=== Qualifying results ===
Pole position winners in each class are marked in bold.

Pos	Class	Team	Driver	Lap Time	Grid
1	P1	#6 Muscle Milk Pickett Racing	Klaus Graf	1:13.573	1
2	P1	#16 Dyson Racing Team	Guy Smith	1:15.358	2
3	**P2**	**#055 Level 5 Motorsports**	**Christophe Bouchut**	**1:15.846**	**3**
4	P2	#95 Level 5 Motorsports	Franck Montagny	1:15.935	4
5	P2	#27 Dempsey Racing	Jonny Cocker	1:17.494	5
6	**PC**	**#9 RSR Racing**	**Bruno Junqueira**	**1:17.867**	**6**
7	PC	#06 CORE Autosport	Tom Kimber-Smith	1:18.092	7
8	PC	#5 Muscle Milk Pickett Racing	Memo Gidley	1:18.114	8
9	PC	#52 PR1/Mathiasen Motorsports	Butch Leitzinger	1:18.396	9
10	PC	#05 CORE Autosport	Colin Braun	1:18.423	10
11	PC	#25 Dempsey Racing	Ryan Lewis	1:18.466	11
12	PC	#8 Merchant Services Racing	Kyle Marcelli	1:18.500	12
13	PC	#18 Performance Tech Motorsports	Ricardo Vera	1:18.725	13
14	P2	#2 Project Libra	Andrew Prendeville	1:21.539	14
15	PC	#7 Merchant Services Racing	Tony Burgess	1:21.645	15
16	**GT**	**#007 Aston Martin Racing**	**Darren Turner**	**1:22.229**	**16**
17	GT	#4 Corvette Racing	Tommy Milner	1:22.661	17
18	GT	#55 BMW Team RLL	Jörg Müller	1:22.905	18
19	GT	#45 Flying Lizard Motorsports	Patrick Long	1:22.919	19
20	GT	#3 Corvette Racing	Antonio García	1:22.919	20
21	GT	#01 Extreme Speed Motorsports	Johannes van Overbeek	1:22.923	21
22	GT	#56 BMW Team RLL	Joey Hand	1:22.939	22
23	GT	#02 Extreme Speed Motorsports	Guy Cosmo	1:22.942	23
24	GT	#17 Team Falken Tire	Bryan Sellers	1:23.356	24
25	GT	#48 Paul Miller Racing	Sascha Maassen	1:23.448	25
26	GT	#23 Lotus / Alex Job Racing	Townsend Bell	1:24.473	26
27	GT	#44 Flying Lizard Motorsports	Seth Neiman	1:26.787	27
28	**GTC**	**#34 Green Hornet Racing**	**Damien Faulkner**	**1:27.495**	**28**
29	GTC	#68 TRG	Nick Tandy	1:27.670	29
30	GTC	#66 TRG	Jeroen Bleekemolen	1:27.673	30
31	GTC	#11 JDX Racing	Martin Ragginger	1:28.155	31
32	GTC	#24 Competition Motorsports	Cort Wagner	1:28.618	32
33	GTC	#22 Alex Job Racing	Anthony Lazzaro	1:28.641	33
34	GTC	#32 GMG Racing	James Sofronas	1:29.298	34
35	P2	#37 Conquest Endurance	No Time		35

== Race ==
=== Race result ===
Class winners in bold. Cars failing to complete 70% of their class winner's distance are marked as Not Classified (NC).

Pos	Class	No	Team	Drivers	Chassis	Tire	Laps
Pos	Class	No	Team	Drivers	Engine	Tire	Laps
1	**P1**	**6**	**(United States) Muscle Milk Pickett Racing**	**(Germany) Klaus Graf (Germany) Lucas Luhr**	**HPD ARX-03a**	M	**242**
1	**P1**	**6**	**(United States) Muscle Milk Pickett Racing**	**(Germany) Klaus Graf (Germany) Lucas Luhr**	**Honda 3.4 L V8**	M	**242**
2	**P2**	**95**	**(United States) Level 5 Motorsports**	**(United States) Scott Tucker (Mexico) Luis Díaz (France) Franck Montagny**	**HPD ARX-03b**	D	**239**
2	**P2**	**95**	**(United States) Level 5 Motorsports**	**(United States) Scott Tucker (Mexico) Luis Díaz (France) Franck Montagny**	**Honda HR28TT 2.8 L Turbo V6**	D	**239**
3	**PC**	**05**	**(United States) CORE Autosport**	**(United States) Colin Braun (United States) Jon Bennett**	**Oreca FLM09**	M	**236**
3	**PC**	**05**	**(United States) CORE Autosport**	**(United States) Colin Braun (United States) Jon Bennett**	**Chevrolet LS3 6.2 L V8**	M	**236**
4	PC	9	(United States) RSR Racing	(Brazil) Bruno Junqueira (United States) Tomy Drissi (Mexico) Roberto González	Oreca FLM09	M	236
4	PC	9	(United States) RSR Racing	(Brazil) Bruno Junqueira (United States) Tomy Drissi (Mexico) Roberto González	Chevrolet LS3 6.2 L V8	M	236
5	PC	06	(United States) CORE Autosport	(Venezuela) Alex Popow (United Kingdom) Tom Kimber-Smith	Oreca FLM09	M	236
5	PC	06	(United States) CORE Autosport	(Venezuela) Alex Popow (United Kingdom) Tom Kimber-Smith	Chevrolet LS3 6.2 L V8	M	236
6	PC	5	(United States) Muscle Milk Pickett Racing	(Mexico) Memo Gidley (United States) Michael Guasch (United Kingdom) Archie Hamilton	Oreca FLM09	M	236
6	PC	5	(United States) Muscle Milk Pickett Racing	(Mexico) Memo Gidley (United States) Michael Guasch (United Kingdom) Archie Hamilton	Chevrolet LS3 6.2 L V8	M	236
7 DNF	PC	8	(United States) Merchant Services Racing	(Canada) Kyle Marcelli (United States) Lucas Downs (United Kingdom) Dean Stirling	Oreca FLM09	M	234
7 DNF	PC	8	(United States) Merchant Services Racing	(Canada) Kyle Marcelli (United States) Lucas Downs (United Kingdom) Dean Stirling	Chevrolet LS3 6.2 L V8	M	234
8	PC	52	(United States) PR1/Mathiasen Motorsports	(United States) Butch Leitzinger (United States) Ken Dobson	Oreca FLM09	M	232
8	PC	52	(United States) PR1/Mathiasen Motorsports	(United States) Butch Leitzinger (United States) Ken Dobson	Chevrolet LS3 6.2 L V8	M	232
9	**GT**	**4**	**(United States) Corvette Racing**	**(United Kingdom) Oliver Gavin (United States) Tommy Milner**	**Chevrolet Corvette C6.R**	M	**232**
9	**GT**	**4**	**(United States) Corvette Racing**	**(United Kingdom) Oliver Gavin (United States) Tommy Milner**	**Chevrolet 5.5 L V8**	M	**232**
10	GT	3	(United States) Corvette Racing	(Denmark) Jan Magnussen (Spain) Antonio García	Chevrolet Corvette C6.R	M	232
10	GT	3	(United States) Corvette Racing	(Denmark) Jan Magnussen (Spain) Antonio García	Chevrolet 5.5 L V8	M	232
11	GT	55	(United States) BMW Team RLL	(United States) Bill Auberlen (Germany) Jörg Müller	BMW M3 GT2	D	232
11	GT	55	(United States) BMW Team RLL	(United States) Bill Auberlen (Germany) Jörg Müller	BMW 4.0 L V8	D	232
12	GT	56	(United States) BMW Team RLL	(Germany) Dirk Müller (United States) Joey Hand	BMW M3 GT2	D	232
12	GT	56	(United States) BMW Team RLL	(Germany) Dirk Müller (United States) Joey Hand	BMW 4.0 L V8	D	232
13	GT	01	(United States) Extreme Speed Motorsports	(United States) Scott Sharp (United States) Johannes van Overbeek	Ferrari 458 Italia GT2	M	232
13	GT	01	(United States) Extreme Speed Motorsports	(United States) Scott Sharp (United States) Johannes van Overbeek	Ferrari 4.5 L V8	M	232
14	GT	45	(United States) Flying Lizard Motorsports	(United States) Patrick Long (Germany) Jörg Bergmeister (Austria) Richard Lietz	Porsche 997 GT3-RSR	M	232
14	GT	45	(United States) Flying Lizard Motorsports	(United States) Patrick Long (Germany) Jörg Bergmeister (Austria) Richard Lietz	Porsche 4.0 L Flat-6	M	232
15	GT	17	(United States) Team Falken Tire	(United States) Bryan Sellers (Germany) Wolf Henzler	Porsche 997 GT3-RSR	F	232
15	GT	17	(United States) Team Falken Tire	(United States) Bryan Sellers (Germany) Wolf Henzler	Porsche 4.0 L Flat-6	F	232
16	PC	25	(United States) Dempsey Racing	(United States) Duncan Ende (France) Henri Richard (United Kingdom) Ryan Lewis	Oreca FLM09	M	231
16	PC	25	(United States) Dempsey Racing	(United States) Duncan Ende (France) Henri Richard (United Kingdom) Ryan Lewis	Chevrolet LS3 6.2 L V8	M	231
17	GT	007	(United Kingdom) Aston Martin Racing	(United Kingdom) Darren Turner (Mexico) Adrián Fernández (Germany) Stefan Mücke	Aston Martin Vantage GTE	M	230
17	GT	007	(United Kingdom) Aston Martin Racing	(United Kingdom) Darren Turner (Mexico) Adrián Fernández (Germany) Stefan Mücke	Aston Martin 4.5 L V8	M	230
18	GT	44	(United States) Flying Lizard Motorsports	(United States) Seth Neiman (Germany) Marco Holzer	Porsche 997 GT3-RSR	M	230
18	GT	44	(United States) Flying Lizard Motorsports	(United States) Seth Neiman (Germany) Marco Holzer	Porsche 4.0 L Flat-6	M	230
19	GT	48	(United States) Paul Miller Racing	(United States) Bryce Miller (Germany) Sascha Maassen	Porsche 997 GT3-RSR	D	229
19	GT	48	(United States) Paul Miller Racing	(United States) Bryce Miller (Germany) Sascha Maassen	Porsche 4.0 L Flat-6	D	229
20	P2	37	(United States) Conquest Endurance	(United Kingdom) Martin Plowman (Denmark) David Heinemeier Hansson (Brazil) Antônio Pizzonia	Morgan LMP2	D	227
20	P2	37	(United States) Conquest Endurance	(United Kingdom) Martin Plowman (Denmark) David Heinemeier Hansson (Brazil) Antônio Pizzonia	Nissan VK45DE 4.5 L V8	D	227
21 DNF	PC	18	(United States) Performance Tech Motorsports	(United States) Anthony Nicolosi (United States) Ricardo Vera	Oreca FLM09	M	225
21 DNF	PC	18	(United States) Performance Tech Motorsports	(United States) Anthony Nicolosi (United States) Ricardo Vera	Chevrolet LS3 6.2 L V8	M	225
22	GT	02	(United States) Extreme Speed Motorsports	(United States) Ed Brown (United States) Guy Cosmo	Ferrari 458 Italia GT2	M	224
22	GT	02	(United States) Extreme Speed Motorsports	(United States) Ed Brown (United States) Guy Cosmo	Ferrari 4.5 L V8	M	224
23	P1	16	(United States) Dyson Racing Team	(United States) Chris Dyson (United Kingdom) Guy Smith (United Kingdom) Johnny Mowlem	Lola B12/60	D	222
23	P1	16	(United States) Dyson Racing Team	(United States) Chris Dyson (United Kingdom) Guy Smith (United Kingdom) Johnny Mowlem	Mazda MZR-R 2.0 L Turbo I4 (Isobutanol)	D	222
24	**GTC**	**66**	**(United States) TRG**	**(Venezuela) Emilio Di Guida (Netherlands) Jeroen Bleekemolen (United States) Bret Curtis**	**Porsche 997 GT3 Cup**	Y	**219**
24	**GTC**	**66**	**(United States) TRG**	**(Venezuela) Emilio Di Guida (Netherlands) Jeroen Bleekemolen (United States) Bret Curtis**	**Porsche 3.8 L Flat-6**	Y	**219**
25	GTC	32	(United States) GMG Racing	(United States) James Sofronas (United States) Alex Welch (United States) René Villeneuve	Porsche 997 GT3 Cup	Y	219
25	GTC	32	(United States) GMG Racing	(United States) James Sofronas (United States) Alex Welch (United States) René Villeneuve	Porsche 3.8 L Flat-6	Y	219
26	GTC	24	(United States) Competition Motorsports	(United States) Bob Faieta (United States) Michael Avenatti (United States) Cort Wagner	Porsche 997 GT3 Cup	Y	219
26	GTC	24	(United States) Competition Motorsports	(United States) Bob Faieta (United States) Michael Avenatti (United States) Cort Wagner	Porsche 3.8 L Flat-6	Y	219
27	GTC	22	(United States) Alex Job Racing	(United States) Anthony Lazzaro (United States) Cooper MacNeil	Porsche 997 GT3 Cup	Y	216
27	GTC	22	(United States) Alex Job Racing	(United States) Anthony Lazzaro (United States) Cooper MacNeil	Porsche 3.8 L Flat-6	Y	216
28	GTC	34	(United States) Green Hornet Racing	(United States) Peter LeSaffre (Republic of Ireland) Damien Faulkner (Netherlands) Sebastiaan Bleekemolen	Porsche 997 GT3 Cup	Y	211
28	GTC	34	(United States) Green Hornet Racing	(United States) Peter LeSaffre (Republic of Ireland) Damien Faulkner (Netherlands) Sebastiaan Bleekemolen	Porsche 3.8 L Flat-6	Y	211
29	P2	055	(United States) Level 5 Motorsports	(United States) Scott Tucker (France) Christophe Bouchut (France) Franck Montagny	HPD ARX-03b	D	207
29	P2	055	(United States) Level 5 Motorsports	(United States) Scott Tucker (France) Christophe Bouchut (France) Franck Montagny	Honda HR28TT 2.8 L Turbo V6	D	207
30	P2	27	(United States) Dempsey Racing	(United States) Patrick Dempsey (United States) Joe Foster (United Kingdom) Jonny Cocker	Lola B12/87	M	202
30	P2	27	(United States) Dempsey Racing	(United States) Patrick Dempsey (United States) Joe Foster (United Kingdom) Jonny Cocker	Judd-BMW HK 3.6 L V8	M	202
31	P2	2	(United Kingdom) Project Libra	(United States) Andrew Prendeville (United States) Rusty Mitchell (Portugal) Duarte Félix da Costa	Radical SR10	D	185
31	P2	2	(United Kingdom) Project Libra	(United States) Andrew Prendeville (United States) Rusty Mitchell (Portugal) Duarte Félix da Costa	Ford (Roush-Yates) EcoBoost 3.2 L Turbo V6	D	185
32	GTC	68	(United States) TRG	(United States) Mike Hedlund (United States) Tracy Krohn (United Kingdom) Nick Tandy	Porsche 997 GT3 Cup	Y	178
32	GTC	68	(United States) TRG	(United States) Mike Hedlund (United States) Tracy Krohn (United Kingdom) Nick Tandy	Porsche 3.8 L Flat-6	Y	178
33 DNF	GTC	11	(United States) JDX Racing	(Canada) Chris Cumming (Hong Kong) Matthew Marsh (Austria) Martin Ragginger	Porsche 997 GT3 Cup	Y	119
33 DNF	GTC	11	(United States) JDX Racing	(Canada) Chris Cumming (Hong Kong) Matthew Marsh (Austria) Martin Ragginger	Porsche 3.8 L Flat-6	Y	119
34 DNF	PC	7	(United States) Merchant Services Racing	(United States) Chapman Ducote (Canada) Tony Burgess (United States) Antonio Downs	Oreca FLM09	M	100
34 DNF	PC	7	(United States) Merchant Services Racing	(United States) Chapman Ducote (Canada) Tony Burgess (United States) Antonio Downs	Chevrolet LS3 6.2 L V8	M	100
35 DNF	GT	23	(United States) Lotus Alex Job Racing	(United States) Townsend Bell (United States) Bill Sweedler	Lotus Evora GTE	Y	67
35 DNF	GT	23	(United States) Lotus Alex Job Racing	(United States) Townsend Bell (United States) Bill Sweedler	Toyota-Cosworth 3.5 L V6	Y	67

American Le Mans Series
Previous race: ALMS at Long Beach	2012 season	Next race: Northeast Grand Prix
