= 2013 American Le Mans Series =

43rd season of the racing series organized by IMSA

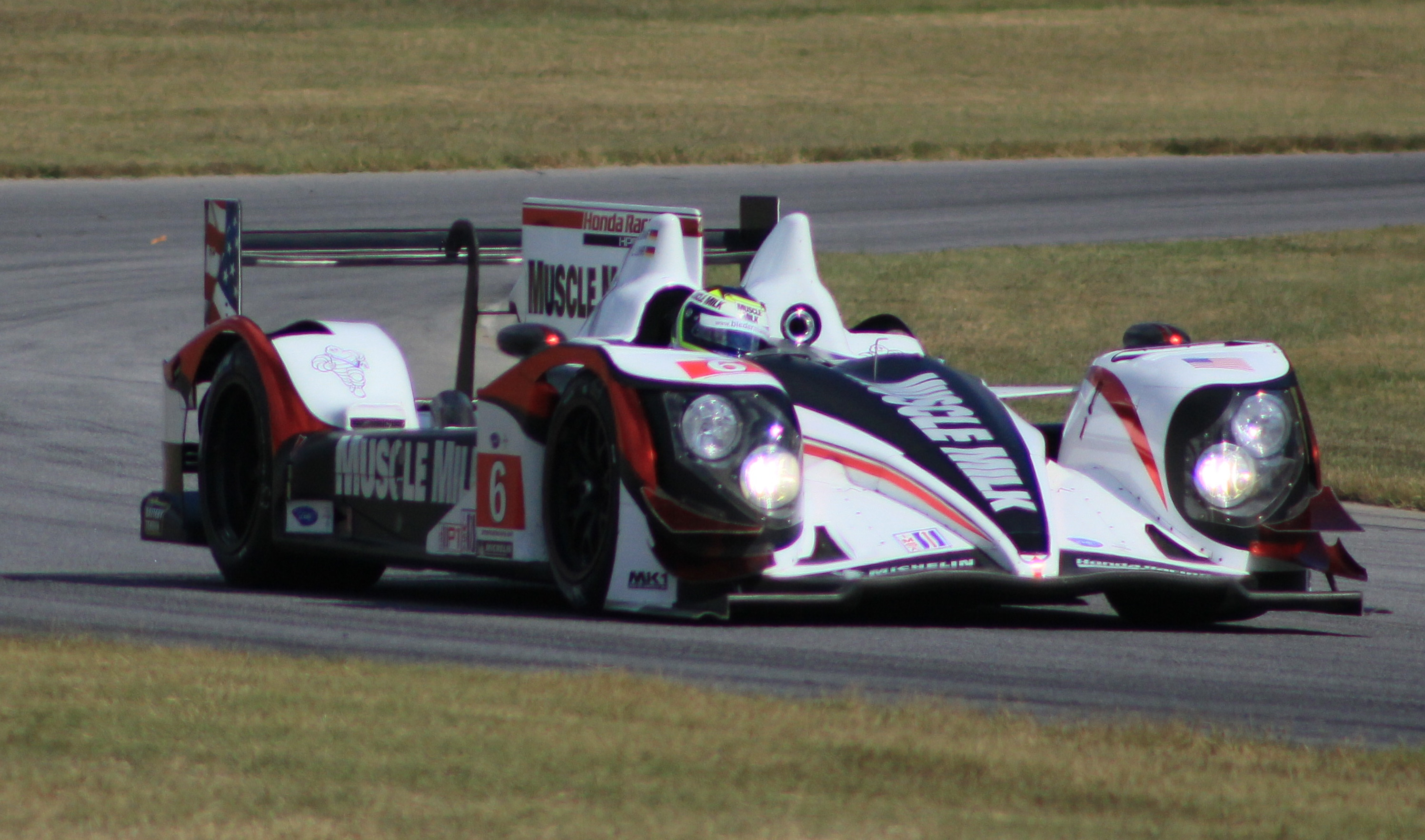
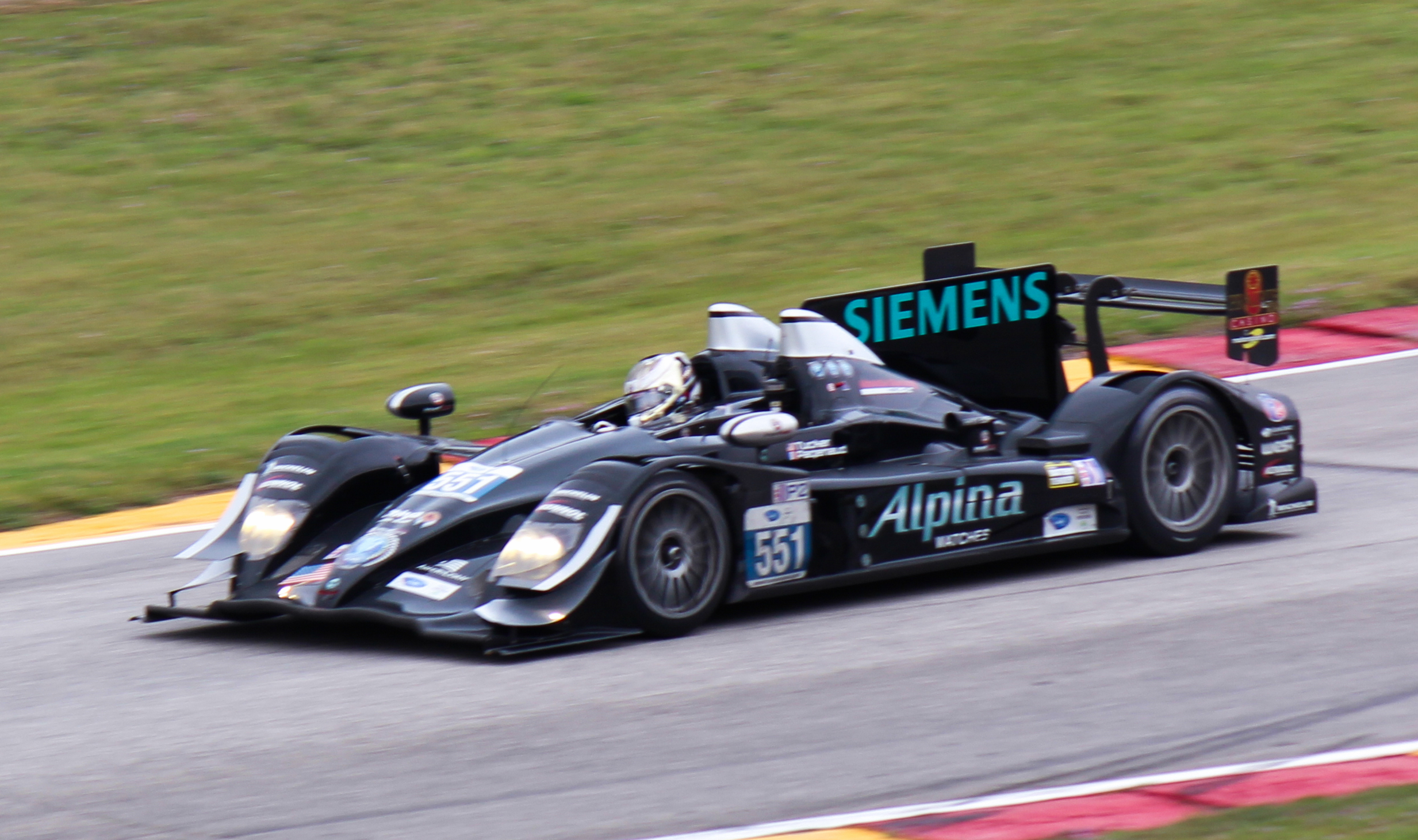
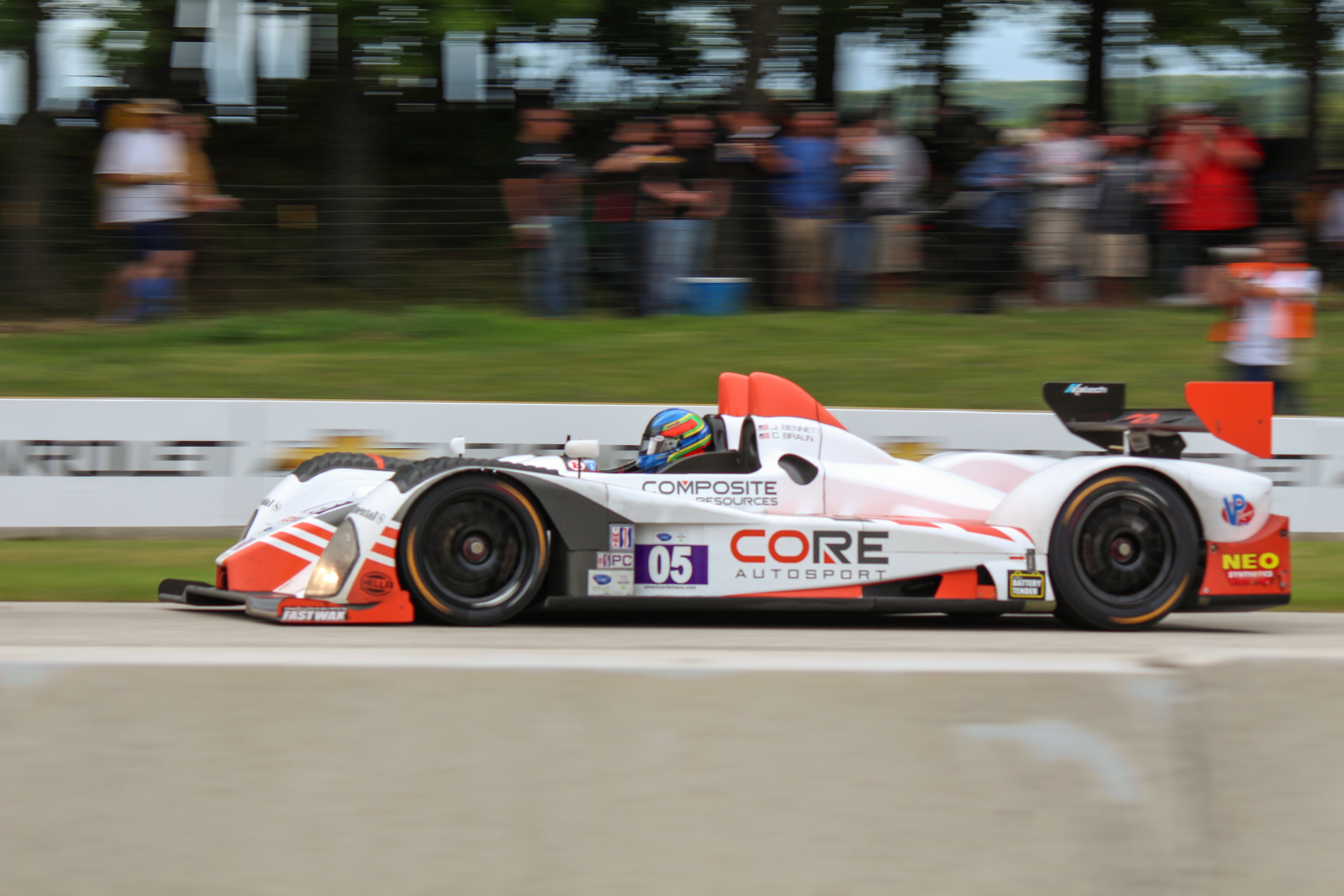
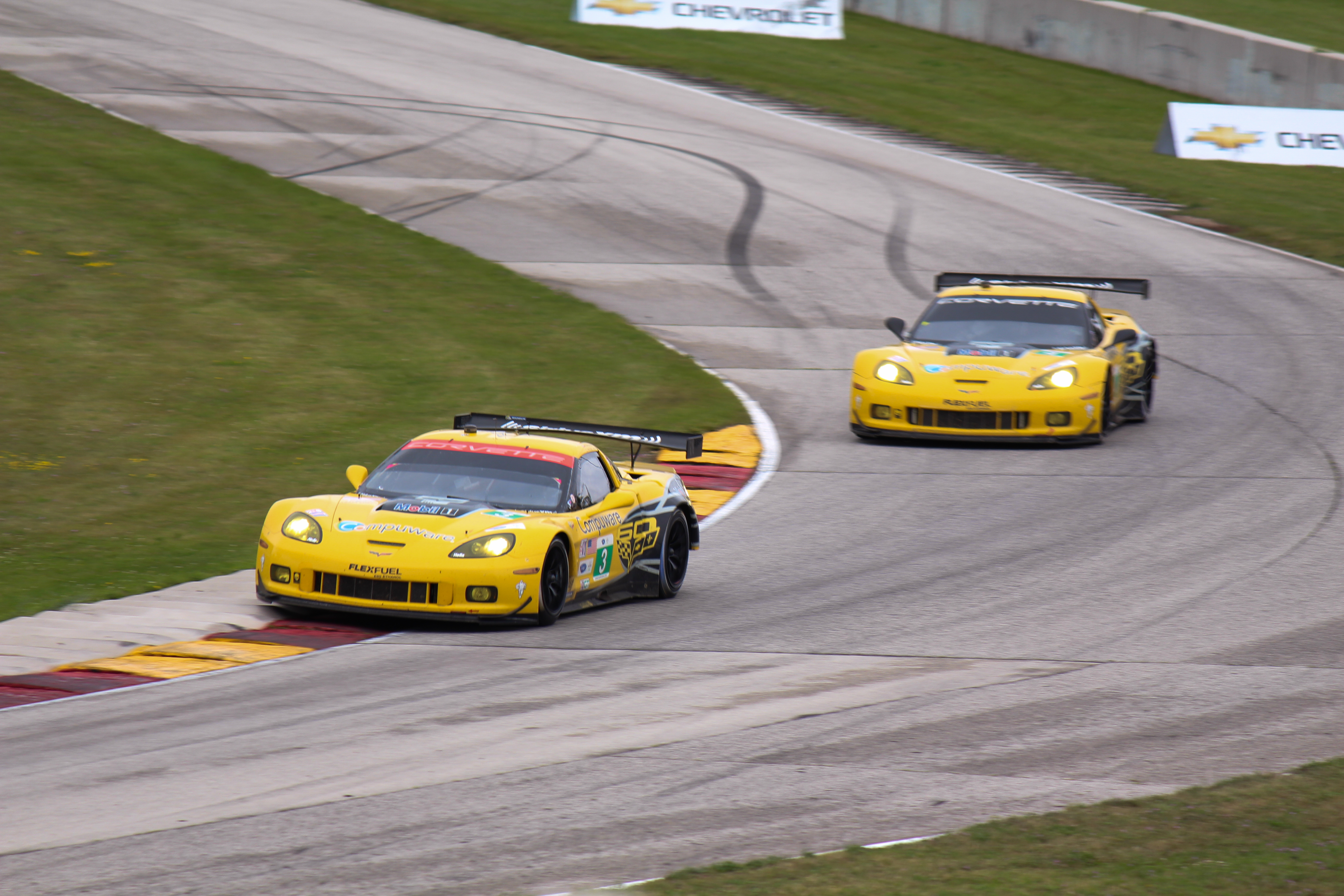
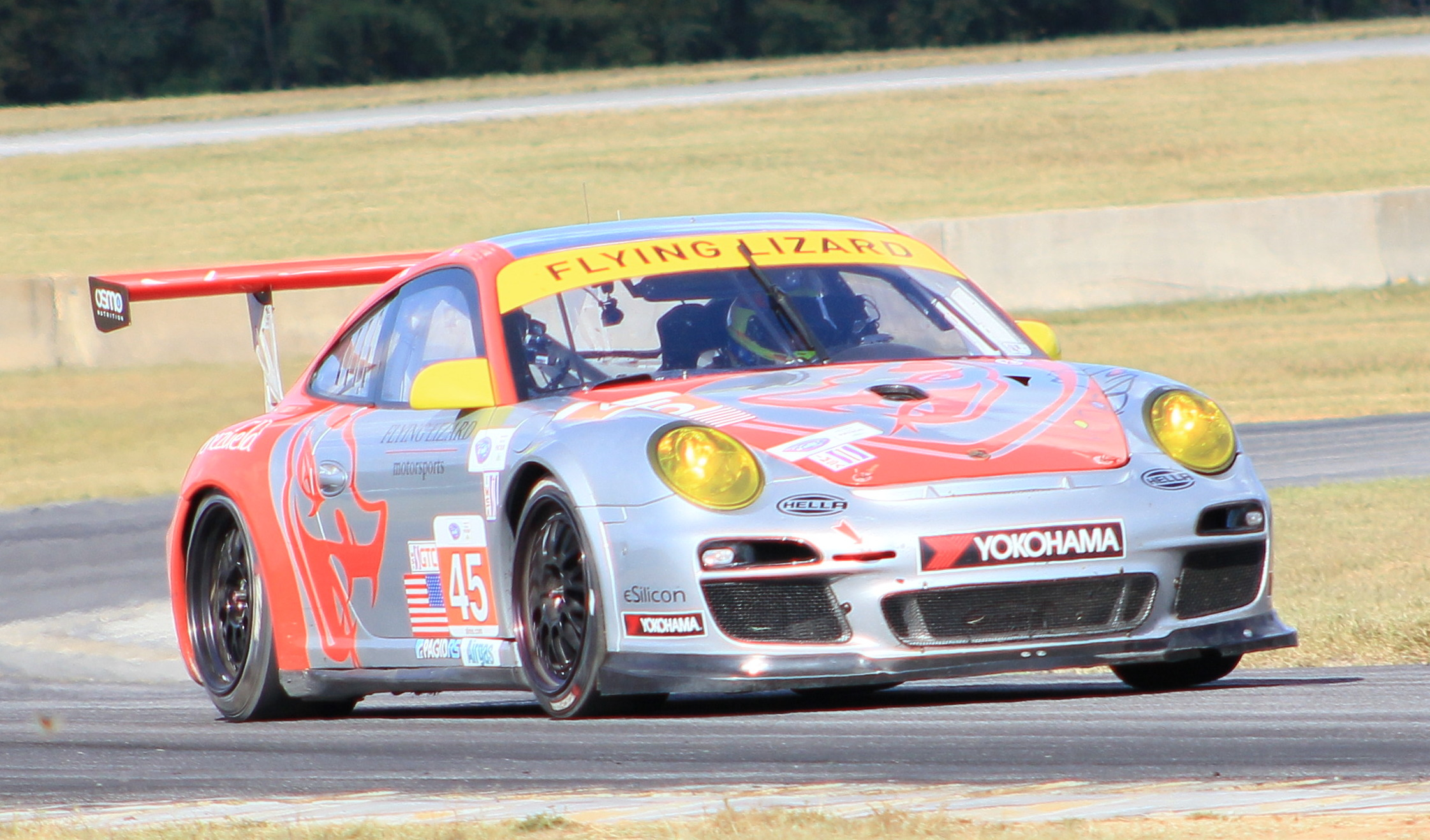
Muscle Milk Pickett Racing won the P1 championships. Level 5 Motorsports won the P2 championships. CORE Autosport won the PC Teams' Championship. Corvette Racing won the GT championships. Flying Lizard Motorsports won the GTC Teams' Championship title.

The 2013 American Le Mans Series was the fifteenth and final season of the International Motor Sports Association GT Championship being labeled as the American Le Mans Series, before merging up with the Grand-Am Rolex Sports Car Series in 2014.

As the IMSA and Grand-Am merger was announced on September 5, 2012, between NASCAR Holdings (Grand-Am's owner) and Panoz Motorsports, the 2013 season was the transition season as both series were now held under the NASCAR Holdings banner. As such, this is the 43rd season of the series dating back to the 1971 IMSA GT Championship.

It began on March 16 with the 61st running of the 12 Hours of Sebring and ended with the 16th running of the Petit Le Mans on October 19. At the seventh round in Baltimore, Muscle Milk Pickett Racing successfully defended their 2012 Prototype One championship.

== Calendar ==
The calendar was announced October 18, 2012. The race at the Circuit of the Americas near Austin, Texas, was previously announced in June 2012, and a combined event with the Rolex Sports Car Series at Road America was announced on September 28, 2012. The event at Mid-Ohio, a joint weekend with the IndyCar Series, was not renewed. The event at Mazda Raceway Laguna Seca was initially scheduled on May 18. However, with this date conflicting with the 24 Hours Nürburgring, the series opted to move the event up one week to May 11. The event was also shortened from 6 hours to 4 hours.

Rnd	Race	Length	Circuit	Location	Date
1	61st Mobil 1 12 Hours of Sebring	12 Hours	Sebring International Raceway	Sebring, Florida	March 16
2	Tequila Patrón American Le Mans Series at Long Beach	2 Hours	Long Beach Street Circuit	Long Beach, California	April 20
3	American Le Mans Monterey	4 Hours	Mazda Raceway Laguna Seca	Monterey, California	May 11
4	American Le Mans Northeast Grand Prix	2 Hours 45 Minutes	Lime Rock Park	Lakeville, Connecticut	July 6
5	Mobil 1 SportsCar Grand Prix	2 Hours 45 Minutes	Canadian Tire Motorsport Park	Bowmanville, Ontario	July 21
6	Orion Energy Systems 245	2 Hours 45 Minutes	Road America	Elkhart Lake, Wisconsin	August 11
7	Grand Prix of Baltimore	2 Hours	Baltimore Street Circuit	Baltimore, Maryland	August 31
8	International Sports Car Weekend	2 Hours 45 Minutes	Circuit of the Americas	Austin, Texas	September 21
9	Oak Tree Grand Prix	2 Hours 45 Minutes	Virginia International Raceway	Alton, Virginia	October 5
10	Petit Le Mans	1,000 mi (1,600 km) or 10 Hours	Road Atlanta	Braselton, Georgia	October 19

== Entry list ==
Entry List
Entrant/Team	Car	Engine	Tyre	No	Drivers	Rounds
P1
(United States) DeltaWing Racing Cars	DeltaWing	Élan (Mazda) 1.9 L Turbo I4	B	0	(United Kingdom) Andy Meyrick	1, 3–6, 8–10
(United States) DeltaWing Racing Cars	DeltaWing	Élan (Mazda) 1.9 L Turbo I4	B	0	(France) Olivier Pla	1
(United States) DeltaWing Racing Cars	DeltaWing	Élan (Mazda) 1.9 L Turbo I4	B	0	(United Kingdom) Katherine Legge	3–6, 8–10
(Germany) Audi Sport Team Joest	Audi R18 e-tron quattro	Audi TDI 3.7 L Turbo V6 (Diesel)	M	1	(Switzerland) Marcel Fässler	1
(Germany) Audi Sport Team Joest	Audi R18 e-tron quattro	Audi TDI 3.7 L Turbo V6 (Diesel)	M	1	(France) Benoît Tréluyer	1
(Germany) Audi Sport Team Joest	Audi R18 e-tron quattro	Audi TDI 3.7 L Turbo V6 (Diesel)	M	1	(United Kingdom) Oliver Jarvis	1
(Germany) Audi Sport Team Joest	Audi R18 e-tron quattro	Audi TDI 3.7 L Turbo V6 (Diesel)	M	2	(Brazil) Lucas di Grassi	1
(Germany) Audi Sport Team Joest	Audi R18 e-tron quattro	Audi TDI 3.7 L Turbo V6 (Diesel)	M	2	(Denmark) Tom Kristensen	1
(Germany) Audi Sport Team Joest	Audi R18 e-tron quattro	Audi TDI 3.7 L Turbo V6 (Diesel)	M	2	(United Kingdom) Allan McNish	1
(United States) Muscle Milk Pickett Racing	HPD ARX-03c	Honda LM-V8 3.4 L V8	M	6	(Germany) Klaus Graf	All
(United States) Muscle Milk Pickett Racing	HPD ARX-03c	Honda LM-V8 3.4 L V8	M	6	(Germany) Lucas Luhr	All
(United States) Muscle Milk Pickett Racing	HPD ARX-03c	Honda LM-V8 3.4 L V8	M	6	(France) Romain Dumas	1, 10
(Switzerland) Rebellion Racing	Lola B12/60	Toyota RV8KLM 3.4 L V8	M	12	(Germany) Nick Heidfeld	1–3, 10
(Switzerland) Rebellion Racing	Lola B12/60	Toyota RV8KLM 3.4 L V8	M	12	(Switzerland) Neel Jani	1–3, 10
(Switzerland) Rebellion Racing	Lola B12/60	Toyota RV8KLM 3.4 L V8	M	12	(France) Nicolas Prost	1, 10
(Switzerland) Rebellion Racing	Lola B12/60	Toyota RV8KLM 3.4 L V8	M	13	(Switzerland) Mathias Beche	1
(Switzerland) Rebellion Racing	Lola B12/60	Toyota RV8KLM 3.4 L V8	M	13	(China) Congfu Cheng	1
(Switzerland) Rebellion Racing	Lola B12/60	Toyota RV8KLM 3.4 L V8	M	13	(Italy) Andrea Belicchi	1
(United States) Dyson Racing Team	Lola B12/60	Mazda MZR-R 2.0 L Turbo I4 (Isobutanol)	M	16	(United Kingdom) Guy Smith	1–4, 7, 9
(United States) Dyson Racing Team	Lola B12/60	Mazda MZR-R 2.0 L Turbo I4 (Isobutanol)	M	16	(United States) Chris Dyson	1–4, 7, 10
(United States) Dyson Racing Team	Lola B12/60	Mazda MZR-R 2.0 L Turbo I4 (Isobutanol)	M	16	(United States) Butch Leitzinger	1
(United States) Dyson Racing Team	Lola B12/60	Mazda MZR-R 2.0 L Turbo I4 (Isobutanol)	M	16	(Canada) Tony Burgess	5–6, 8, 10
(United States) Dyson Racing Team	Lola B12/60	Mazda MZR-R 2.0 L Turbo I4 (Isobutanol)	M	16	(United States) Chris McMurry	5–6, 8, 10
(United States) Dyson Racing Team	Lola B12/60	Mazda MZR-R 2.0 L Turbo I4 (Isobutanol)	M	16	(United Kingdom) Johnny Mowlem	9
P2
(United Kingdom) Greaves Motorsport	Zytek Z11SN	Nissan VK45DE 4.5 L V8	D	41	(United Kingdom) Tom Kimber-Smith	1
(United Kingdom) Greaves Motorsport	Zytek Z11SN	Nissan VK45DE 4.5 L V8	D	41	(Germany) Christian Zugel	1
(United Kingdom) Greaves Motorsport	Zytek Z11SN	Nissan VK45DE 4.5 L V8	D	41	(United States) Eric Lux	1
(United States) Extreme Speed Motorsports	HPD ARX-03b	Honda HR28TT 2.8 L Turbo V6	M	01	(United States) Scott Sharp	All
(United States) Extreme Speed Motorsports	HPD ARX-03b	Honda HR28TT 2.8 L Turbo V6	M	01	(United States) Guy Cosmo	1–6
(United States) Extreme Speed Motorsports	HPD ARX-03b	Honda HR28TT 2.8 L Turbo V6	M	01	(Australia) David Brabham	1, 10
(United States) Extreme Speed Motorsports	HPD ARX-03b	Honda HR28TT 2.8 L Turbo V6	M	01	(United States) Anthony Lazzaro	7–10
(United States) Extreme Speed Motorsports	HPD ARX-03b	Honda HR28TT 2.8 L Turbo V6	M	02	(United States) Ed Brown	All
(United States) Extreme Speed Motorsports	HPD ARX-03b	Honda HR28TT 2.8 L Turbo V6	M	02	(United States) Johannes van Overbeek	All
(United States) Extreme Speed Motorsports	HPD ARX-03b	Honda HR28TT 2.8 L Turbo V6	M	02	(United States) Anthony Lazzaro	1
(United States) Extreme Speed Motorsports	HPD ARX-03b	Honda HR28TT 2.8 L Turbo V6	M	02	(United Kingdom) Rob Bell	10
(United States) Level 5 Motorsports	HPD ARX-03b	Honda HR28TT 2.8 L Turbo V6	M	551	(United States) Scott Tucker	All
(United States) Level 5 Motorsports	HPD ARX-03b	Honda HR28TT 2.8 L Turbo V6	M	551	(Australia) Ryan Briscoe	1–2, 4, 7–10
(United States) Level 5 Motorsports	HPD ARX-03b	Honda HR28TT 2.8 L Turbo V6	M	551	(United Kingdom) Marino Franchitti	1, 3, 5, 10
(United States) Level 5 Motorsports	HPD ARX-03b	Honda HR28TT 2.8 L Turbo V6	M	551	(France) Simon Pagenaud	6
(United States) Level 5 Motorsports	HPD ARX-03b	Honda HR28TT 2.8 L Turbo V6	M	552	(United States) Scott Tucker	1–8
(United States) Level 5 Motorsports	HPD ARX-03b	Honda HR28TT 2.8 L Turbo V6	M	552	(United States) Ryan Hunter-Reay	1
(United States) Level 5 Motorsports	HPD ARX-03b	Honda HR28TT 2.8 L Turbo V6	M	552	(France) Simon Pagenaud	1
(United States) Level 5 Motorsports	HPD ARX-03b	Honda HR28TT 2.8 L Turbo V6	M	552	(United Kingdom) Marino Franchitti	2, 4, 6–9
(United States) Level 5 Motorsports	HPD ARX-03b	Honda HR28TT 2.8 L Turbo V6	M	552	(Australia) Ryan Briscoe	3
(United States) Level 5 Motorsports	HPD ARX-03b	Honda HR28TT 2.8 L Turbo V6	M	552	(United Kingdom) Mike Conway	5
(United States) Level 5 Motorsports	HPD ARX-03b	Honda HR28TT 2.8 L Turbo V6	M	552	(Mexico) Ricardo González	6
(United States) Level 5 Motorsports	HPD ARX-03b	Honda HR28TT 2.8 L Turbo V6	M	552	(United States) Guy Cosmo	7–10
(United States) Level 5 Motorsports	HPD ARX-03b	Honda HR28TT 2.8 L Turbo V6	M	552	(Sweden) Stefan Johansson	9
(United States) Level 5 Motorsports	HPD ARX-03b	Honda HR28TT 2.8 L Turbo V6	M	552	(United Kingdom) Jonny Kane	10
(United States) Level 5 Motorsports	HPD ARX-03b	Honda HR28TT 2.8 L Turbo V6	M	552	(United Kingdom) Peter Dumbreck	10
PC
(United States) Starworks Motorsport	Oreca FLM09	Chevrolet LS3 6.2 L V8	C	5	(United Kingdom) Ryan Dalziel	8
(United States) Starworks Motorsport	Oreca FLM09	Chevrolet LS3 6.2 L V8	C	5	(United States) John Pew	8
(United States) BAR1 Motorsports	Oreca FLM09	Chevrolet LS3 6.2 L V8	C	7	(United States) Rusty Mitchell	All
(United States) BAR1 Motorsports	Oreca FLM09	Chevrolet LS3 6.2 L V8	C	7	(United States) Tomy Drissi	1–5, 7–8, 10
(United States) BAR1 Motorsports	Oreca FLM09	Chevrolet LS3 6.2 L V8	C	7	(United States) Chapman Ducote	1
(United States) BAR1 Motorsports	Oreca FLM09	Chevrolet LS3 6.2 L V8	C	7	(United States) James French	6, 9–10
(United States) BAR1 Motorsports	Oreca FLM09	Chevrolet LS3 6.2 L V8	C	8	(Canada) Kyle Marcelli	All
(United States) BAR1 Motorsports	Oreca FLM09	Chevrolet LS3 6.2 L V8	C	8	(Canada) Chris Cumming	All
(United States) BAR1 Motorsports	Oreca FLM09	Chevrolet LS3 6.2 L V8	C	8	(Sweden) Stefan Johansson	1, 10
(United States) RSR Racing	Oreca FLM09	Chevrolet LS3 6.2 L V8	C	9	(Brazil) Bruno Junqueira	1–8, 10
(United States) RSR Racing	Oreca FLM09	Chevrolet LS3 6.2 L V8	C	9	(United States) Duncan Ende	1–6, 10
(United States) RSR Racing	Oreca FLM09	Chevrolet LS3 6.2 L V8	C	9	(Venezuela) Alex Popow	1, 7
(United States) RSR Racing	Oreca FLM09	Chevrolet LS3 6.2 L V8	C	9	(Denmark) David Heinemeier Hansson	8
(United States) RSR Racing	Oreca FLM09	Chevrolet LS3 6.2 L V8	C	9	(United States) Gustavo Menezes	10
(United States) Performance Tech Motorsports	Oreca FLM09	Chevrolet LS3 6.2 L V8	C	18	(United States) Tristan Nunez	All
(United States) Performance Tech Motorsports	Oreca FLM09	Chevrolet LS3 6.2 L V8	C	18	(United States) Charlie Shears	1–3, 5–8, 10
(United States) Performance Tech Motorsports	Oreca FLM09	Chevrolet LS3 6.2 L V8	C	18	(Denmark) David Heinemeier Hansson	1
(United States) Performance Tech Motorsports	Oreca FLM09	Chevrolet LS3 6.2 L V8	C	18	(United States) Ryan Booth	4, 9
(United States) 8 Star Motorsports	Oreca FLM09	Chevrolet LS3 6.2 L V8	C	25	(Brazil) Oswaldo Negri Jr.	10
(United States) 8 Star Motorsports	Oreca FLM09	Chevrolet LS3 6.2 L V8	C	25	(United States) Sean Rayhall	10
(United States) PR1/Mathiasen Motorsports	Oreca FLM09	Chevrolet LS3 6.2 L V8	C	52	(United States) Mike Guasch	All
(United States) PR1/Mathiasen Motorsports	Oreca FLM09	Chevrolet LS3 6.2 L V8	C	52	(United States) David Cheng	1, 4–6, 10
(United States) PR1/Mathiasen Motorsports	Oreca FLM09	Chevrolet LS3 6.2 L V8	C	52	(Canada) David Ostella	1
(United States) PR1/Mathiasen Motorsports	Oreca FLM09	Chevrolet LS3 6.2 L V8	C	52	(Mexico) Luis Díaz	2–3
(United States) PR1/Mathiasen Motorsports	Oreca FLM09	Chevrolet LS3 6.2 L V8	C	52	(United States) Dane Cameron	5, 7–10
(Germany) DragonSpeed	Oreca FLM09	Chevrolet LS3 6.2 L V8	C	81	(Germany) Mirco Schultis	1, 3–6, 8–9
(Germany) DragonSpeed	Oreca FLM09	Chevrolet LS3 6.2 L V8	C	81	(Germany) Patrick Simon	1
(Germany) DragonSpeed	Oreca FLM09	Chevrolet LS3 6.2 L V8	C	81	(Germany) Pierre Kaffer	1
(Germany) DragonSpeed	Oreca FLM09	Chevrolet LS3 6.2 L V8	C	81	(Netherlands) Renger van der Zande	3–6, 8–9
(United States) CORE Autosport	Oreca FLM09	Chevrolet LS3 6.2 L V8	C	05	(United States) Jon Bennett	All
(United States) CORE Autosport	Oreca FLM09	Chevrolet LS3 6.2 L V8	C	05	(United States) Colin Braun	1–7
(United States) CORE Autosport	Oreca FLM09	Chevrolet LS3 6.2 L V8	C	05	(Canada) Mark Wilkins	1, 10
(United States) CORE Autosport	Oreca FLM09	Chevrolet LS3 6.2 L V8	C	05	(United Kingdom) Tom Kimber-Smith	8–10
GT
(United States) Corvette Racing	Chevrolet Corvette C6.R	Chevrolet LS5.5R 5.5 L V8	M	3	(Spain) Antonio García	All
(United States) Corvette Racing	Chevrolet Corvette C6.R	Chevrolet LS5.5R 5.5 L V8	M	3	(Denmark) Jan Magnussen	All
(United States) Corvette Racing	Chevrolet Corvette C6.R	Chevrolet LS5.5R 5.5 L V8	M	3	(United States) Jordan Taylor	1, 10
(United States) Corvette Racing	Chevrolet Corvette C6.R	Chevrolet LS5.5R 5.5 L V8	M	4	(United Kingdom) Oliver Gavin	All
(United States) Corvette Racing	Chevrolet Corvette C6.R	Chevrolet LS5.5R 5.5 L V8	M	4	(United States) Tommy Milner	All
(United States) Corvette Racing	Chevrolet Corvette C6.R	Chevrolet LS5.5R 5.5 L V8	M	4	(United Kingdom) Richard Westbrook	1, 10
(United States) Team Falken Tire	Porsche 997 GT3-RSR	Porsche M97/74 4.0 L Flat-6	F	17	(Germany) Wolf Henzler	All
(United States) Team Falken Tire	Porsche 997 GT3-RSR	Porsche M97/74 4.0 L Flat-6	F	17	(United States) Bryan Sellers	All
(United States) Team Falken Tire	Porsche 997 GT3-RSR	Porsche M97/74 4.0 L Flat-6	F	17	(United Kingdom) Nick Tandy	1, 10
(United States) Team West/AJR/Boardwalk Ferrari	Ferrari 458 Italia GT2	Ferrari F136 4.5 L V8	Y	23	(United States) Townsend Bell	1–9
(United States) Team West/AJR/Boardwalk Ferrari	Ferrari 458 Italia GT2	Ferrari F136 4.5 L V8	Y	23	(United States) Bill Sweedler	1–4, 7–10
(United States) Team West/AJR/Boardwalk Ferrari	Ferrari 458 Italia GT2	Ferrari F136 4.5 L V8	Y	23	(United States) Leh Keen	1, 5–6, 10
(United States) Team West/AJR/Boardwalk Ferrari	Ferrari 458 Italia GT2	Ferrari F136 4.5 L V8	Y	23	(United Kingdom) Johnny Mowlem	10
(United States) Paul Miller Racing	Porsche 997 GT3-RSR	Porsche M97/74 4.0 L Flat-6	M	48	(United States) Bryce Miller	All
(United States) Paul Miller Racing	Porsche 997 GT3-RSR	Porsche M97/74 4.0 L Flat-6	M	48	(Germany) Marco Holzer	All
(United States) Paul Miller Racing	Porsche 997 GT3-RSR	Porsche M97/74 4.0 L Flat-6	M	48	(Austria) Richard Lietz	1
(United States) Paul Miller Racing	Porsche 997 GT3-RSR	Porsche M97/74 4.0 L Flat-6	M	48	(France) Emmanuel Collard	10
(United States) BMW Team RLL	BMW Z4 GTE	BMW P65B44 4.4 L V8	M	55	(United States) Bill Auberlen	1–9
(United States) BMW Team RLL	BMW Z4 GTE	BMW P65B44 4.4 L V8	M	55	(Belgium) Maxime Martin	1–7, 9–10
(United States) BMW Team RLL	BMW Z4 GTE	BMW P65B44 4.4 L V8	M	55	(Germany) Jörg Müller	1, 10
(United States) BMW Team RLL	BMW Z4 GTE	BMW P65B44 4.4 L V8	M	55	(United States) Joey Hand	8
(United States) BMW Team RLL	BMW Z4 GTE	BMW P65B44 4.4 L V8	M	55	(Germany) Uwe Alzen	10
(United States) BMW Team RLL	BMW Z4 GTE	BMW P65B44 4.4 L V8	M	56	(Germany) Dirk Müller	All
(United States) BMW Team RLL	BMW Z4 GTE	BMW P65B44 4.4 L V8	M	56	(United States) Joey Hand	1–2, 5, 7, 9
(United States) BMW Team RLL	BMW Z4 GTE	BMW P65B44 4.4 L V8	M	56	(United States) John Edwards	1, 3–4, 6, 8, 10
(United States) BMW Team RLL	BMW Z4 GTE	BMW P65B44 4.4 L V8	M	56	(United States) Bill Auberlen	10
(United States) Risi Competizione	Ferrari 458 Italia GT2	Ferrari F136 4.5 L V8	M	62	(Monaco) Olivier Beretta	1–4, 6–10
(United States) Risi Competizione	Ferrari 458 Italia GT2	Ferrari F136 4.5 L V8	M	62	(Italy) Matteo Malucelli	1–4, 6–10
(United States) Risi Competizione	Ferrari 458 Italia GT2	Ferrari F136 4.5 L V8	M	62	(Italy) Gianmaria Bruni	1
(United States) Risi Competizione	Ferrari 458 Italia GT2	Ferrari F136 4.5 L V8	M	62	(United Kingdom) Robin Liddell	10
(United States) SRT Motorsports	SRT Viper GTS-R	SRT Viper 8.0 L V10	M	91	(Germany) Dominik Farnbacher	All
(United States) SRT Motorsports	SRT Viper GTS-R	SRT Viper 8.0 L V10	M	91	(Belgium) Marc Goossens	All
(United States) SRT Motorsports	SRT Viper GTS-R	SRT Viper 8.0 L V10	M	91	(United Kingdom) Ryan Dalziel	1, 10
(United States) SRT Motorsports	SRT Viper GTS-R	SRT Viper 8.0 L V10	M	93	(Canada) Kuno Wittmer	All
(United States) SRT Motorsports	SRT Viper GTS-R	SRT Viper 8.0 L V10	M	93	(United States) Jonathan Bomarito	All
(United States) SRT Motorsports	SRT Viper GTS-R	SRT Viper 8.0 L V10	M	93	(United States) Tommy Kendall	1, 10
(United Kingdom) Aston Martin Racing	Aston Martin Vantage GTE	Aston Martin AM05 4.5 L V8	M	97	(United Kingdom) Darren Turner	1
(United Kingdom) Aston Martin Racing	Aston Martin Vantage GTE	Aston Martin AM05 4.5 L V8	M	97	(Germany) Stefan Mücke	1
(United Kingdom) Aston Martin Racing	Aston Martin Vantage GTE	Aston Martin AM05 4.5 L V8	M	97	(Brazil) Bruno Senna	1
(United Kingdom) Aston Martin Racing	Aston Martin Vantage GTE	Aston Martin AM05 4.5 L V8	M	007	(Canada) Paul Dalla Lana	1
(United Kingdom) Aston Martin Racing	Aston Martin Vantage GTE	Aston Martin AM05 4.5 L V8	M	007	(United States) Billy Johnson	1
(United Kingdom) Aston Martin Racing	Aston Martin Vantage GTE	Aston Martin AM05 4.5 L V8	M	007	(Portugal) Pedro Lamy	1
(United States) CORE Autosport	Porsche 997 GT3-RSR	Porsche M97/74 4.0 L Flat-6	M	06	(United States) Patrick Long	3–10
(United States) CORE Autosport	Porsche 997 GT3-RSR	Porsche M97/74 4.0 L Flat-6	M	06	(United Kingdom) Tom Kimber-Smith	3–7
(United States) CORE Autosport	Porsche 997 GT3-RSR	Porsche M97/74 4.0 L Flat-6	M	06	(United States) Colin Braun	8–10
(United States) CORE Autosport	Porsche 997 GT3-RSR	Porsche M97/74 4.0 L Flat-6	M	06	(Denmark) Michael Christensen	10
GTC
(United States) Dempsey Racing/Del Piero	Porsche 997 GT3 Cup	Porsche 4.0 L Flat-6	Y	10	(United States) Michael Avenatti	1–3
(United States) Dempsey Racing/Del Piero	Porsche 997 GT3 Cup	Porsche 4.0 L Flat-6	Y	10	(United States) Bob Faieta	1–2
(United States) Dempsey Racing/Del Piero	Porsche 997 GT3 Cup	Porsche 4.0 L Flat-6	Y	10	(United States) Andrew Davis	1, 3
(United States) Dempsey Racing/Del Piero	Porsche 997 GT3 Cup	Porsche 4.0 L Flat-6	Y	10	(United States) Darren Law	10
(United States) Dempsey Racing/Del Piero	Porsche 997 GT3 Cup	Porsche 4.0 L Flat-6	Y	10	(United States) Charles Espenlaub	10
(United States) Dempsey Racing/Del Piero	Porsche 997 GT3 Cup	Porsche 4.0 L Flat-6	Y	10	(United States) Charles Putman	10
(United States) Dempsey Racing/Del Piero	Porsche 997 GT3 Cup	Porsche 4.0 L Flat-6	Y	27	(United States) Patrick Dempsey	All
(United States) Dempsey Racing/Del Piero	Porsche 997 GT3 Cup	Porsche 4.0 L Flat-6	Y	27	(United States) Joe Foster	1–2, 10
(United States) Dempsey Racing/Del Piero	Porsche 997 GT3 Cup	Porsche 4.0 L Flat-6	Y	27	(United States) Andy Lally	1, 3–10
(United States) JDX Racing	Porsche 997 GT3 Cup	Porsche 4.0 L Flat-6	Y	11	(United States) Mike Hedlund	All
(United States) JDX Racing	Porsche 997 GT3 Cup	Porsche 4.0 L Flat-6	Y	11	(Belgium) Jan Heylen	All
(United States) JDX Racing	Porsche 997 GT3 Cup	Porsche 4.0 L Flat-6	Y	11	(United States) Jon Fogarty	1, 10
(United States) Alex Job Racing	Porsche 997 GT3 Cup	Porsche 4.0 L Flat-6	Y	22	(United States) Cooper MacNeil	All
(United States) Alex Job Racing	Porsche 997 GT3 Cup	Porsche 4.0 L Flat-6	Y	22	(Netherlands) Jeroen Bleekemolen	All
(United States) Alex Job Racing	Porsche 997 GT3 Cup	Porsche 4.0 L Flat-6	Y	22	(South Africa) Dion von Moltke	1
(United States) Alex Job Racing	Porsche 997 GT3 Cup	Porsche 4.0 L Flat-6	Y	22	(Netherlands) Sebastiaan Bleekemolen	10
(United States) NGT Motorsport	Porsche 997 GT3 Cup	Porsche 4.0 L Flat-6	Y	30	(Venezuela) Henrique Cisneros	1–9
(United States) NGT Motorsport	Porsche 997 GT3 Cup	Porsche 4.0 L Flat-6	Y	30	(United Kingdom) Sean Edwards	1–2, 5–9
(United States) NGT Motorsport	Porsche 997 GT3 Cup	Porsche 4.0 L Flat-6	Y	30	(Germany) Marco Seefried	1
(United States) NGT Motorsport	Porsche 997 GT3 Cup	Porsche 4.0 L Flat-6	Y	30	(United Kingdom) Nick Tandy	3
(United States) NGT Motorsport	Porsche 997 GT3 Cup	Porsche 4.0 L Flat-6	Y	30	(France) Nicolas Armindo	4
(United States) NGT Motorsport	Porsche 997 GT3 Cup	Porsche 4.0 L Flat-6	Y	31	(Poland) Kuba Giermaziak	1, 9
(United States) NGT Motorsport	Porsche 997 GT3 Cup	Porsche 4.0 L Flat-6	Y	31	(Colombia) Carlos Gómez	1
(United States) NGT Motorsport	Porsche 997 GT3 Cup	Porsche 4.0 L Flat-6	Y	31	(Germany) Mario Farnbacher	1
(United States) NGT Motorsport	Porsche 997 GT3 Cup	Porsche 4.0 L Flat-6	Y	31	(United States) Eduardo Cisneros	9
(United States) NGT Motorsport	Porsche 997 GT3 Cup	Porsche 4.0 L Flat-6	Y	31	(France) Nicolas Armindo	10
(United States) NGT Motorsport	Porsche 997 GT3 Cup	Porsche 4.0 L Flat-6	Y	31	(Denmark) Christina Nielsen	10
(United States) NGT Motorsport	Porsche 997 GT3 Cup	Porsche 4.0 L Flat-6	Y	31	(Venezuela) Angel Benitez Jr.	10
(United States) Flying Lizard Motorsports	Porsche 997 GT3 Cup	Porsche 4.0 L Flat-6	Y	44	(Germany) Pierre Ehret	1, 3
(United States) Flying Lizard Motorsports	Porsche 997 GT3 Cup	Porsche 4.0 L Flat-6	Y	44	(United States) Brett Sandberg	1, 10
(United States) Flying Lizard Motorsports	Porsche 997 GT3 Cup	Porsche 4.0 L Flat-6	Y	44	(Switzerland) Alexandre Imperatori	1
(United States) Flying Lizard Motorsports	Porsche 997 GT3 Cup	Porsche 4.0 L Flat-6	Y	44	(South Africa) Dion von Moltke	2–10
(United States) Flying Lizard Motorsports	Porsche 997 GT3 Cup	Porsche 4.0 L Flat-6	Y	44	(United States) Brian Wong	2
(United States) Flying Lizard Motorsports	Porsche 997 GT3 Cup	Porsche 4.0 L Flat-6	Y	44	(United States) Seth Neiman	4–10
(United States) Flying Lizard Motorsports	Porsche 997 GT3 Cup	Porsche 4.0 L Flat-6	Y	45	(Venezuela) Nelson Canache Jr.	All
(United States) Flying Lizard Motorsports	Porsche 997 GT3 Cup	Porsche 4.0 L Flat-6	Y	45	(United States) Spencer Pumpelly	All
(United States) Flying Lizard Motorsports	Porsche 997 GT3 Cup	Porsche 4.0 L Flat-6	Y	45	(United States) Brian Wong	1
(United States) Flying Lizard Motorsports	Porsche 997 GT3 Cup	Porsche 4.0 L Flat-6	Y	45	(United States) Seth Neiman	3
(United States) Flying Lizard Motorsports	Porsche 997 GT3 Cup	Porsche 4.0 L Flat-6	Y	45	(United States) Madison Snow	10
(United States) TRG	Porsche 997 GT3 Cup	Porsche 4.0 L Flat-6	Y	66	(United States) Ben Keating	All
(United States) TRG	Porsche 997 GT3 Cup	Porsche 4.0 L Flat-6	Y	66	(Republic of Ireland) Damien Faulkner	All
(United States) TRG	Porsche 997 GT3 Cup	Porsche 4.0 L Flat-6	Y	66	(United States) Craig Stanton	1, 10
(United States) TRG	Porsche 997 GT3 Cup	Porsche 4.0 L Flat-6	Y	67	(United States) Marc Bunting	7
(United States) TRG	Porsche 997 GT3 Cup	Porsche 4.0 L Flat-6	Y	67	(Austria) Norbert Siedler	7
(United States) TRG	Porsche 997 GT3 Cup	Porsche 4.0 L Flat-6	Y	68	(United States) Al Carter	1, 7
(United States) TRG	Porsche 997 GT3 Cup	Porsche 4.0 L Flat-6	Y	68	(France) Kévin Estre	1, 7
(United States) TRG	Porsche 997 GT3 Cup	Porsche 4.0 L Flat-6	Y	68	(United States) Carlos de Quesada	1
(United States) TRG	Porsche 997 GT3 Cup	Porsche 4.0 L Flat-6	Y	68	(United States) Bret Curtis	2
(United States) TRG	Porsche 997 GT3 Cup	Porsche 4.0 L Flat-6	Y	68	(United States) Craig Stanton	3–4
(United States) TRG	Porsche 997 GT3 Cup	Porsche 4.0 L Flat-6	Y	68	(United States) Andrew Novich	3
(United States) TRG	Porsche 997 GT3 Cup	Porsche 4.0 L Flat-6	Y	68	(Canada) David Ostella	4
(United States) TRG	Porsche 997 GT3 Cup	Porsche 4.0 L Flat-6	Y	68	(Venezuela) Alex Popow	5
(United States) TRG	Porsche 997 GT3 Cup	Porsche 4.0 L Flat-6	Y	68	(United Kingdom) Ryan Dalziel	5
(United States) TRG	Porsche 997 GT3 Cup	Porsche 4.0 L Flat-6	Y	68	(United States) Jeff Courtney	6
(United States) TRG	Porsche 997 GT3 Cup	Porsche 4.0 L Flat-6	Y	68	(United States) Madison Snow	6
(United States) Competition Motorsports	Porsche 997 GT3 Cup	Porsche 4.0 L Flat-6	Y	99	(Australia) David Calvert-Jones	1–2
(United States) Competition Motorsports	Porsche 997 GT3 Cup	Porsche 4.0 L Flat-6	Y	99	(Germany) Sascha Maassen	1
(United States) Competition Motorsports	Porsche 997 GT3 Cup	Porsche 4.0 L Flat-6	Y	99	(United States) Lawson Aschenbach	1
(United States) Competition Motorsports	Porsche 997 GT3 Cup	Porsche 4.0 L Flat-6	Y	99	(United States) Ted Ballou	2–3
(United States) Competition Motorsports	Porsche 997 GT3 Cup	Porsche 4.0 L Flat-6	Y	99	(United States) Cort Wagner	3

=== Team announcements ===
- On September 17, 2012, it was announced that the DeltaWing prototype had been cleared for entry into the ALMS for 2013.
- On October 26, 2012, Porsche announced that it would cease development of the 911 GT3-RSR (Type 997), which had competed in the series since 2005, to focus its efforts on developing its next generation 911 GT3-RSR (Type 991) race car set to debut in 2014. As a result, the development partnership with Flying Lizard Motorsports was discontinued. Porsche will, however, continue to provide support for customer teams continuing to compete with the 911 GT3-RSR (Type 997).
- On November 15, 2012, Flying Lizard Motorsports announced that they would transition to competing in the GT Challenge category. On that date they confirmed a full-season campaign for their #44 Porsche 911 GT3 Cup entry to be piloted by team principal Seth Neiman and 2-time 24 Hours of Daytona GT class champion Spencer Pumpelly.
- On December 2, 2012, BMW announced that they would stop racing with the M3 GT2 in favour of the BMW Z4 GTE model.
- On December 5, 2012, Rebellion Racing announced that they would contest the full season with a single Lola B12/60 Toyota P1 Prototype. The team will also enter a second car for at least the 12 Hours of Sebring.
- On December 6, 2012, CORE Autosport confirmed their return to the PC category with drivers Colin Braun and Jon Bennett piloting their No. 05 entry. Braun and Bennett will be joined by Mark Wilkins for the 12 Hours of Sebring and Petit Le Mans. The driver lineup for the team's second entry (No. 06) is still pending.
- On December 19, 2012 Paul Miller Racing announced that Porsche works driver, Marco Holzer, would join Bryce Miller in competing for the GT championship in the team's 911 GT3-RSR (Type 997). The team also announced the switch to Michelin tires, having previously competed on Dunlop tires.
- On January 18, 2013, Risi Competizione announced their return to the GT class. They will field one Ferrari 458 Italia, with drivers yet to be announced.
- On January 22, 2013, CORE Autosport announced that it would field a Porsche 997 GT3-RSR in GT, in addition to their PC effort. Patrick Long and Tom Kimber-Smith will drive it.
- Extreme Speed Motorsports will switch to P2 fielding two HPD ARX-03b prototypes, retaining drivers Scott Sharp and Johannes van Overbeek in the No. 01 and Ed Brown and Guy Cosmo in the No. 02.

== Results and standings ==
Overall winners in bold.

Rnd	Circuit	P1 Winning Team	P2 Winning Team	PC Winning Team	GT Winning Team	GTC Winning Team	Report
Rnd	Circuit	P1 Winning Drivers	P2 Winning Drivers	PC Winning Drivers	GT Winning Drivers	GTC Winning Drivers	Report
1	Sebring	**(Germany) #1 Audi Sport Team Joest**	(United States) #551 Level 5 Motorsports	(United States) #52 PR1/Mathiasen Motorsports	(United States) #4 Corvette Racing	(United States) #22 Alex Job Racing	Report
1	Sebring	**(Switzerland) Marcel Fässler** **(France) Benoît Tréluyer** **(United Kingdom) Oliver Jarvis**	(United States) Scott Tucker (United Kingdom) Marino Franchitti (Australia) Ryan Briscoe	(United States) David Cheng (United States) Mike Guasch (Canada) David Ostella	(United Kingdom) Oliver Gavin (United Kingdom) Richard Westbrook (United States) Tommy Milner	(United States) Cooper MacNeil (South Africa) Dion von Moltke (Netherlands) Jeroen Bleekemolen	Report
2	Long Beach	**(United States) #6 Muscle Milk Pickett Racing**	(United States) #01 Extreme Speed Motorsports	(United States) #05 CORE Autosport	(United States) #55 BMW Team RLL	(United States) #30 NGT Motorsport	Report
2	Long Beach	**(Germany) Lucas Luhr** **(Germany) Klaus Graf**	(United States) Scott Sharp (United States) Guy Cosmo	(United States) Jon Bennett (United States) Colin Braun	(United States) Bill Auberlen (Belgium) Maxime Martin	(United Kingdom) Sean Edwards (Venezuela) Henrique Cisneros	Report
3	Laguna Seca	**(United States) #6 Muscle Milk Pickett Racing**	(United States) #551 Level 5 Motorsports	(United States) #52 PR1/Mathiasen Motorsports	(United States) #3 Corvette Racing	(United States) #30 NGT Motorsport	Report
3	Laguna Seca	**(Germany) Lucas Luhr** **(Germany) Klaus Graf**	(United States) Scott Tucker (United Kingdom) Marino Franchitti	(Mexico) Luis Díaz (United States) Mike Guasch	(Spain) Antonio García (Denmark) Jan Magnussen	(United Kingdom) Nick Tandy (Venezuela) Henrique Cisneros	Report
4	Lime Rock	**(United States) #6 Muscle Milk Pickett Racing**	(United States) #551 Level 5 Motorsports	(United States) #9 RSR Racing	(United States) #56 BMW Team RLL	(United States) #45 Flying Lizard Motorsports	Report
4	Lime Rock	**(Germany) Lucas Luhr** **(Germany) Klaus Graf**	(United States) Scott Tucker (Australia) Ryan Briscoe	(Brazil) Bruno Junqueira (United States) Duncan Ende	(United States) John Edwards (Germany) Dirk Müller	(United States) Spencer Pumpelly (Venezuela) Nelson Canache Jr.	Report
5	Mosport	**(United States) #6 Muscle Milk Pickett Racing**	(United States) #551 Level 5 Motorsports	(United States) #05 CORE Autosport	(United States) #4 Corvette Racing	(United States) #22 Alex Job Racing	Report
5	Mosport	**(Germany) Lucas Luhr** **(Germany) Klaus Graf**	(United States) Scott Tucker (United Kingdom) Marino Franchitti	(United States) Jon Bennett (United States) Colin Braun	(United Kingdom) Oliver Gavin (United States) Tommy Milner	(United States) Cooper MacNeil (Netherlands) Jeroen Bleekemolen	Report
6	Road America	**(United States) #6 Muscle Milk Pickett Racing**	(United States) #551 Level 5 Motorsports	(United States) #9 RSR Racing	(United States) #91 SRT Motorsports	(United States) #45 Flying Lizard Motorsports	Report
6	Road America	**(Germany) Lucas Luhr** **(Germany) Klaus Graf**	(United States) Scott Tucker (France) Simon Pagenaud	(Brazil) Bruno Junqueira (United States) Duncan Ende	(Germany) Dominik Farnbacher (Belgium) Marc Goossens	(United States) Spencer Pumpelly (Venezuela) Nelson Canache Jr.	Report
7	Baltimore	**(United States) #6 Muscle Milk Pickett Racing**	(United States) #552 Level 5 Motorsports	(United States) #18 Performance Tech Motorsports	(United States) #3 Corvette Racing	(United States) #44 Flying Lizard Motorsports	Report
7	Baltimore	**(Germany) Lucas Luhr** **(Germany) Klaus Graf**	(United Kingdom) Marino Franchitti (United States) Guy Cosmo	(United States) Tristan Nunez (United States) Charlie Shears	(Spain) Antonio García (Denmark) Jan Magnussen	(South Africa) Dion von Moltke (United States) Seth Neiman	Report
8	Austin	**(United States) #6 Muscle Milk Pickett Racing**	(United States) #551 Level 5 Motorsports	(United States) #8 BAR1 Motorsports	(United States) #3 Corvette Racing	(United States) #66 TRG	Report
8	Austin	**(Germany) Lucas Luhr** **(Germany) Klaus Graf**	(United States) Scott Tucker (Australia) Ryan Briscoe	(Canada) Kyle Marcelli (Canada) Chris Cumming	(Spain) Antonio García (Denmark) Jan Magnussen	(United States) Ben Keating (Republic of Ireland) Damien Faulkner	Report
9	Virginia	**(United States) #6 Muscle Milk Pickett Racing**	(United States) #551 Level 5 Motorsports	(United States) #8 BAR1 Motorsports	(United States) #62 Risi Competizione	(United States) #66 TRG	Report
9	Virginia	**(Germany) Lucas Luhr** **(Germany) Klaus Graf**	(United States) Scott Tucker (Australia) Ryan Briscoe	(Canada) Kyle Marcelli (Canada) Chris Cumming	(Monaco) Olivier Beretta (Italy) Matteo Malucelli	(United States) Ben Keating (Republic of Ireland) Damien Faulkner	Report
10	Road Atlanta	**(Switzerland) #12 Rebellion Racing**	(United States) #551 Level 5 Motorsports	(United States) #8 BAR1 Motorsports	(United States) #17 Team Falken Tire	(United States) #45 Flying Lizard Motorsports	Report
10	Road Atlanta	**(Germany) Nick Heidfeld** **(France) Nicolas Prost** **(Switzerland) Neel Jani**	(United States) Scott Tucker (Australia) Ryan Briscoe (United Kingdom) Marino Franchitti	(Canada) Kyle Marcelli (Canada) Chris Cumming (Sweden) Stefan Johansson	(United States) Bryan Sellers (Germany) Wolf Henzler (United Kingdom) Nick Tandy	(United States) Spencer Pumpelly (United States) Madison Snow (Venezuela) Nelson Canache Jr.	Report

== Championships ==
Points were awarded to the top ten cars and drivers which complete at least 70% of their class winner's distance. Teams with multiple entries only score the points of their highest finishing entry in each race. Drivers were required to drive a minimum of 45 minutes to earn points, except for the Long Beach event which required only 30 minutes. Drivers are required to complete a particular amount of the minimum number of laps in order to earn points. The number of laps vary depending on the course size.

Points System
Race Distance	Position									
Race Distance	1st	2nd	3rd	4th	5th	6th	7th	8th	9th	10th
Less than four hours	20	16	13	10	8	6	4	3	2	1
Between four and eight hours	22	18	15	12	10	8	6	5	4	3
More than eight hours	24	20	17	14	12	10	8	7	6	5

=== Team championships ===
Teams with full season entries are awarded points in the team championships. Teams which participated in a partial season or on a race-by-race basis are not included in these championships.

==== P1 standings ====
Pos.	Team	Chassis	Engine	SEB	LBH	LGA	LRP	MOS	ELK	BAL	AUS	VIR	PET	Total
1	(United States) Muscle Milk Pickett Racing	HPD ARX-03a	Honda LM-V8 3.4 L V8	2	1	1	1	1	1	1	1	1	Ret	182
2	(United States) Dyson Racing Team	Lola B12/60	Mazda MZR-R 2.0 L Turbo I4	Ret	Ret	Ret	2	2	2	2	2	2	2	116
3	(Switzerland) Rebellion Racing	Lola B12/60	Toyota RV8KLM 3.4 L V8	1	2	2							1	82
4	(United States) DeltaWing Racing Cars	DeltaWing	Élan (Mazda) 1.9 L Turbo I4	Ret		Ret	Ret	Ret	3		3	Ret	Ret	26

==== P2 standings ====
Pos.	Team	Chassis	Engine	SEB	LBH	LGA	LRP	MOS	ELK	BAL	AUS	VIR	PET	Total
1	(United States) Level 5 Motorsports	HPD ARX-03b	Honda HR28TT 2.8 L Turbo V6	1	3	1	2^{1}	1	1	1	1	1	1	199
2	(United States) Extreme Speed Motorsports	HPD ARX-03b	Honda HR28TT 2.8 L Turbo V6	3	1	3	1	2	2	2	3	2	3	169

- 1: Car was scored in 1st place in the race results, but was subsequently penalized for a late-race avoidable contact incident, resulting in the team being awarded points and winnings as the 3rd-place finisher. The points and earnings for the 2nd and 3rd place cars were elevated to 1st and 2nd, respectively.

==== PC standings ====
All teams utilize the Oreca FLM09 chassis with Chevrolet LS3 engine.

Pos	Team	SEB	LBH	LGA	LRP	MOS	ELK	BAL	AUS	VIR	PET	Total
1	(United States) CORE Autosport	5	1	2	2	1	4	2	3	2	3	148
2	(United States) BAR1 Motorsports	2	4	4	4	3	2	Ret	1	1	1	145
3	(United States) PR1/Mathiasen Motorsports	1	2	1	6	4	3	3	2	5	5	142
4	(United States) Performance Tech Motorsports	3	5	3	3	6	5	1	4	4	Ret	110
5	(United States) RSR Racing	4	3	6	1	5	1	Ret	6		6	103
6	(Germany) DragonSpeed	7		5	5	2	6		5	6		54

==== GT standings ====
Pos	Team	Chassis	Engine	SEB	LBH	LGA	LRP	MOS	ELK	BAL	AUS	VIR	PET	Total
1	(United States) Corvette Racing	Chevrolet Corvette C6.R	Chevrolet LS5.5R 5.5 L V8	24	10	22	16	20	16	20	20	13	10	171
2	(United States) BMW Team RLL	BMW Z4 GTE	BMW P65B44 4.4 L V8	14	20	18	20	8	4	13	13	10	20	140
3	(United States) SRT Motorsports	SRT Viper GTS-R	SRT Viper 8.0 L V10	12	13	12	8	16	20	8	16	4	12	121
4	(United States) Risi Competizione	Ferrari 458 Italia GT2	Ferrari F136 4.5 L V8	20	2	6	1		1	0	6	20	17	73
5	(United States) Team Falken Tire	Porsche 997 GT3-RSR	Porsche M97/74 4.0 L Flat-6	17	1	0	3	1	2	0	4	3	24	55
6	(United States) CORE Autosport	Porsche 997 GT3-RSR	Porsche M97/74 4.0 L Flat-6			8	13	3	8	0	0	16	7	55
7	(United States) Paul Miller Racing	Porsche 997 GT3-RSR	Porsche M97/74 4.0 L Flat-6	10	6	10	4	2	10	0	2	0	0	44
8	(United States) Team West/AJR/Boardwalk Ferrari	Ferrari 458 Italia GT2	Ferrari F136 4.5 L V8	0	4	15	2	4	0	4	3	1	6	39

==== GTC standings ====
All teams utilize variations of the Porsche 997 GT3 Cup.

Pos	Team	SEB	LBH	LGA	LRP	MOS	ELK	BAL	AUS	VIR	PET	Total
1	(United States) Flying Lizard Motorsports	20	16	5	20	16	20	20	8	8	24	157
2	(United States) Alex Job Racing	24	10	15	8	20	16	16	6	16	17	148
3	(United States) NGT Motorsport	17	20	22	3	6	13	8	16	13	12	130
4	(United States) JDX Racing	14	3	10	16	8	4	13	10	10	20	108
5	(United States) TRG	12	8	12	13	13	6	0	20	20	0	104
6	(United States) Dempsey Racing/Del Piero	10	6	18	4	10	10	10	13	6	10	97
7	(United States) Competition Motorsport		0	3								3

=== Driver championships ===
Drivers who participated in races but failed to score points over the course of the season are not listed.

==== P1 standings ====
Pos	Driver	Team	SEB	LBH	LGA	LRP	MOS	ELK	BAL	AUS	VIR	PET	Total
1	(Germany) Klaus Graf	(United States) Muscle Milk Pickett Racing	20	20	22	20	20	20	20	20	20	0	182
1	(Germany) Lucas Luhr	(United States) Muscle Milk Pickett Racing	20	20	22	20	20	20	20	20	20	0	182
2	(Germany) Nick Heidfeld	(Switzerland) Rebellion Racing	24	16	18							24	82
2	(Switzerland) Neel Jani	(Switzerland) Rebellion Racing	24	16	18							24	82
3	(United States) Chris McMurry	(United States) Dyson Racing					16	16		16		20	68
3	(Canada) Tony Burgess	(United States) Dyson Racing					16	16		16		20	68
4	(United States) Chris Dyson	(United States) Dyson Racing	0	0	0	16			16			20	52
5	(France) Nicolas Prost	(Switzerland) Rebellion Racing	24									24	48
6	(United Kingdom) Guy Smith	(United States) Dyson Racing	0	0	0	16			16		16		48
7	(United Kingdom) Andy Meyrick	(United States) DeltaWing Racing Cars	0		0	0	0	13		13	0	0	26
7	(United Kingdom) Katherine Legge	(United States) DeltaWing Racing Cars			0	0	0	13		13	0	0	26
8	(France) Romain Dumas	(United States) Muscle Milk Pickett Racing	20									0	20
9	(United Kingdom) Johnny Mowlem	(United States) Dyson Racing									16		16

==== P2 standings ====
Pos	Driver	Team	SEB	LBH	LGA	LRP	MOS	ELK	BAL	AUS	VIR	PET	Total
1	(United States) Scott Tucker	(United States) Level 5 Motorsports	24	13	22	10	20	20	0	20	20	24	173
2	(United States) Scott Sharp	(United States) Extreme Speed Motorsports	14	20	15	20	16	16	16	10	16	20	163
3	(United States) Guy Cosmo	(United States) Extreme Speed Motorsports	14	20	15	20	16	16					154
3	(United States) Guy Cosmo	(United States) Level 5 Motorsports							20	16	0	17	154
4	(United Kingdom) Marino Franchitti	(United States) Level 5 Motorsports	24	10	22	16	20	13	20	16	0	0	141
5	(Australia) Ryan Briscoe	(United States) Level 5 Motorsports	24	13	18	10			0	20	20	24	129
6	(United States) Anthony Lazzaro	(United States) Extreme Speed Motorsports	17						16	10	16	20	79
7	(United States) Johannes van Overbeek	(United States) Extreme Speed Motorsports	17	16	0	13	10	0	0	13	0	0	69
7	(United States) Ed Brown	(United States) Extreme Speed Motorsports	17	16	0	13	10	0	0	13	0	0	69
8	(France) Simon Pagenaud	(United States) Level 5 Motorsports	20					20					40
9	(Australia) David Brabham	(United States) Extreme Speed Motorsports	0									20	20
10	(United States) Ryan Hunter-Reay	(United States) Level 5 Motorsports	20										20
11	(United Kingdom) Jonny Kane	(United States) Level 5 Motorsports										17	17
11	(United Kingdom) Peter Dumbreck	(United States) Level 5 Motorsports										17	17
12	(United Kingdom) Mike Conway	(United States) Level 5 Motorsports					13						13
13	(Mexico) Ricardo González	(United States) Level 5 Motorsports						13					13
14	(Sweden) Stefan Johansson	(United States) Level 5 Motorsports									13		13

==== PC standings ====
Drivers in the PC category are allowed to drive for more than one car during an event. If a driver is in each car for a minimum of two hours each, he is allowed to score the points from whichever car he chooses.

Pos	Driver	Team	SEB	LBH	LGA	LRP	MOS	ELK	BAL	AUS	VIR	PET	Total
1	(United States) Mike Guasch	(United States) PR1/Mathiasen Motorsports	24	16	22	6	10	13	13	16	8	14	142
2	(Canada) Chris Cumming	(United States) BAR1 Motorsports	20	6	12	10	13	16	0	20	20	24	141
3	(United States) Jon Bennett	(United States) CORE Autosport	0	20	18	16	20	10	16	0	16	20	136
4	(Canada) Kyle Marcelli	(United States) BAR1 Motorsports	20	6	12	10	0	16	0	20	20	24	128
5	(United States) Colin Braun	(United States) CORE Autosport	12	20	18	16	20	10	16				112
6	(United States) Tristan Nunez	(United States) Performance Tech Motorsports	17	8	15	13	6	8	20	13	10	0	110
7	(Brazil) Bruno Junqueira	(United States) RSR Racing	14	13	8	20	0	20	0	8		12	95
8	(United States) Duncan Ende	(United States) RSR Racing	0	13	8	20	8	20				12	81
9	(United States) Charlie Shears	(United States) Performance Tech Motorsports	17	8	15		6	0	20	13		0	79
10	(United States) Rusty Mitchell	(United States) BAR1 Motorsports	10	10	10	4	0	4		6	13	17	74
11	(United States) Tomy Drissi	(United States) BAR1 Motorsports	10	10	10	4	0			6		17	57
12	(United States) Dane Cameron	(United States) PR1/Mathiasen Motorsports							13	16	8	14	51
13	(Germany) Mirco Schultis	(Germany) DragonSpeed	0		0	8	16	6		10	6		46
13	(Netherlands) Renger van der Zande	(Germany) DragonSpeed			0	8	16	6		10	6		46
14	(Mexico) Luis Díaz	(United States) PR1/Mathiasen Motorsports		16	22								38
15	(United Kingdom) Tom Kimber-Smith	(United States) CORE Autosport								0	16	20	36
16	(United States) James French	(United States) BAR1 Motorsports						4			13	17	34
17	(Denmark) David Heinemeier Hansson	(United States) Performance Tech Motorsports	17										25
17	(Denmark) David Heinemeier Hansson	(United States) RSR Racing								8			25
18	(Canada) David Ostella	(United States) PR1/Mathiasen Motorsports	24										24
19	(Venezuela) Alex Popow	(United States) RSR Racing	14						0				14
20	(Canada) Mark Wilkins	(United States) CORE Autosport	12									0	12
21	(United States) Chapman Ducote	(United States) BAR1 Motorsports	10										10
22	(Germany) Pierre Kaffer	(Germany) DragonSpeed	8										8
22	(Germany) Patrick Simon	(Germany) DragonSpeed	8										8
23	(United States) David Cheng	(United States) PR1/Mathiasen Motorsports	0			6	0	0				0	6

==== GT standings ====
Pos	Driver	Team	SEB	LBH	LGA	LRP	MOS	ELK	BAL	AUS	VIR	PET	Total
1	(Spain) Antonio García	(United States) Corvette Racing	0	8	22	16	10	16	20	20	13	10	135
1	(Denmark) Jan Magnussen	(United States) Corvette Racing	0	8	22	16	10	16	20	20	13	10	135
2	(Germany) Dirk Müller	(United States) BMW Team RLL	8	16	18	20	8	3	13	13	10	20	129
3	(United Kingdom) Oliver Gavin	(United States) Corvette Racing	24	10	5	6	20	13	16	0	6	5	105
3	(United States) Tommy Milner	(United States) Corvette Racing	24	10	5	6	20	13	16	0	6	5	105
4	(United States) Bill Auberlen	(United States) BMW Team RLL	14	20	0	10	6	4	10	10	8	20	102
5	(Germany) Dominik Farnbacher	(United States) SRT Motorsports	12	13	12	0	16	20	8	8	4	8	101
5	(Belgium) Marc Goossens	(United States) SRT Motorsports	12	13	12	0	16	20	8	8	4	8	101
6	(Belgium) Maxime Martin	(United States) BMW Team RLL	14	20	0	10	6	4	10		8	14	86
7	(United States) John Edwards	(United States) BMW Team RLL	8		18	20		3		13		20	82
8	(Monaco) Olivier Beretta	(United States) Risi Competizione	20	2	6	1		1	0	6	20	17	73
8	(Italy) Matteo Malucelli	(United States) Risi Competizione	20	2	6	1		1	0	6	20	17	73
9	(United States) Jonathan Bomarito	(United States) SRT Motorsports	7	3	0	8	13	6	6	16	2	12	73
9	(Canada) Kuno Wittmer	(United States) SRT Motorsports	7	3	0	8	13	6	6	16	2	12	73
10	(Germany) Wolf Henzler	(United States) Team Falken Tire	17	1	0	3	1	2	0	4	3	24	55
10	(United States) Bryan Sellers	(United States) Team Falken Tire	17	1	0	3	1	2	0	4	3	24	55
11	(United States) Patrick Long	(United States) CORE Autosport			8	13	3	8	0	0	16	7	55
12	(United States) Joey Hand	(United States) BMW Team RLL	8	16			8		0	10	10		52
13	(Germany) Marco Holzer	(United States) Paul Miller Racing	10	6	10	4	2	10	0	2	0	0	44
13	(United States) Bryce Miller	(United States) Paul Miller Racing	10	6	10	4	2	10	0	2	0	0	44
14	(United Kingdom) Nick Tandy	(United States) Team Falken Tire	17									24	41
15	(United States) Bill Sweedler	(United States) Team West/AJR	0	4	15	2			4	3	1	6	35
16	(United States) Townsend Bell	(United States) Team West/AJR	0	4	15	2	4	0	4	3	1		33
17	(United Kingdom) Tom Kimber-Smith	(United States) CORE Autosport			8	13	3	8	0				32
18	(United Kingdom) Richard Westbrook	(United States) Corvette Racing	24									5	29
19	(Germany) Jörg Müller	(United States) BMW Team RLL	14									14	28
20	(United States) Colin Braun	(United States) CORE Autosport								0	16	7	23
21	(Italy) Gianmaria Bruni	(United States) Risi Competizione	20										20
22	(United Kingdom) Ryan Dalziel	(United States) SRT Motorsports	12									8	20
23	(United States) Tommy Kendall	(United States) SRT Motorsports	7									12	19
24	(United Kingdom) Robin Liddell	(United States) Risi Competizione										17	17
25	(Germany) Uwe Alzen	(United States) BMW Team RLL										14	14
26	(United States) Jordan Taylor	(United States) Corvette Racing	0									10	10
27	(Austria) Richard Lietz	(United States) Paul Miller Racing	10										10
28	(United States) Leh Keen	(United States) Team West/AJR	0				4	0				6	10
29	(Denmark) Michael Christensen	(United States) CORE Autosport										7	7
30	(United Kingdom) Johnny Mowlem	(United States) Team West/AJR										6	6

==== GTC standings ====
Pos	Driver	Team	SEB	LBH	LGA	LRP	MOS	ELK	BAL	AUS	VIR	PET	Total
1	(Netherlands) Jeroen Bleekemolen	(United States) Alex Job Racing	24	10	15	8	20	16	16	6	16	17	148
1	(United States) Cooper MacNeil	(United States) Alex Job Racing	24	10	15	8	20	16	16	6	16	17	148
2	(Venezuela) Nelson Canache Jr.	(United States) Flying Lizard Motorsports	20	16	5	20	16	20	6	8	4	24	139
2	(United States) Spencer Pumpelly	(United States) Flying Lizard Motorsports	20	16	5	20	16	20	6	8	4	24	139
3	(Venezuela) Henrique Cisneros	(United States) NGT Motorsport	17	20	22	3	6	13	8	16	13		118
4	(Belgium) Jan Heylen	(United States) JDX Racing	14	3	10	16	8	4	13	10	10	20	108
5	(United Kingdom) Sean Edwards	(United States) NGT Motorsport	17	20			6	13	8	16	13		93
6	(United States) Mike Hedlund	(United States) JDX Racing	14	3	10	16	8	4	13	10	10	0	88
7	(United States) Patrick Dempsey	(United States) Dempsey Racing/Del Piero	10	6	18	4	10	10	10	13	6	0	87
8	(Republic of Ireland) Damien Faulkner	(United States) TRG	12	4	12	13	3	0	0	20	20	0	84
8	(United States) Ben Keating	(United States) TRG	12	4	12	13	3	0	0	20	20	0	84
9	(South Africa) Dion von Moltke	(United States) Flying Lizard Motorsports	0	13	4	6	4	8	20	4	8	14	81
10	(United States) Andy Lally	(United States) Dempsey Racing/Del Piero	10		18	4	10	10	10	13	6	0	81
11	(United States) Jon Fogarty	(United States) JDX Racing	14									20	34
12	(United States) Seth Neiman	(United States) Flying Lizard Motorsports			0	0	0	8	0	4	8	14	34
13	(United States) Brian Wong	(United States) Flying Lizard Motorsports	20	13									33
14	(United States) Craig Stanton	(United States) TRG	0	8	6	10						0	24
15	(United Kingdom) Nick Tandy	(United States) NGT Motorsport			22								22
16	(United States) Michael Avenatti	(United States) Dempsey Racing/Del Piero	8	0	8								16
16	(United States) Andrew Davis	(United States) Dempsey Racing/Del Piero	8		8								16
17	(United States) Brett Sandberg	(United States) Flying Lizard Motorsports	0									14	34
18	(United Kingdom) Ryan Dalziel	(United States) TRG					13						13
18	(Venezuela) Alex Popow	(United States) TRG					13						13
19	(France) Nicolas Armindo	(United States) NGT Motorsport				0						12	12
19	(Venezuela) Angel Benitez Jr.	(United States) NGT Motorsport										12	12
19	(Denmark) Christina Nielsen	(United States) NGT Motorsport										12	12
20	(Germany) Pierre Ehret	(United States) Flying Lizard Motorsports	7		4								11
21	(Canada) David Ostella	(United States) TRG				10							10
22	(United States) Charles Espenlaub	(United States) Dempsey Racing/Del Piero										10	10
22	(United States) Charles Putman	(United States) Dempsey Racing/Del Piero										10	10
23	(United States) Bret Curtis	(United States) TRG		8									8
24	(United States) Bob Faieta	(United States) Dempsey Racing/Del Piero	8	0									8
25	(Switzerland) Alexandre Imperatori	(United States) Flying Lizard Motorsports	7										7
26	(United States) Joe Foster	(United States) Dempsey Racing/Del Piero	0	6								0	6
27	(United States) Madison Snow	(United States) TRG						6				0	6
28	(United States) Andrew Novich	(United States) TRG			6								6
29	(United States) Al Carter	(United States) TRG	6						0				6
29	(France) Kévin Estre	(United States) TRG	6						0				6
30	(United States) Ted Ballou	(United States) Competition Motorsports		0	3								3
30	(United States) Cort Wagner	(United States) Competition Motorsports			3								3
