= 2013 American Le Mans Series VIR 240 =

Sports car race

Track map of VIR

The 2013 American Le Mans Series VIR 240 was a sports car race held at Virginia International Raceway in Alton, Virginia on October 5, 2013. The race was the ninth round of the 2013 American Le Mans Series.

== Background ==
=== Preview ===
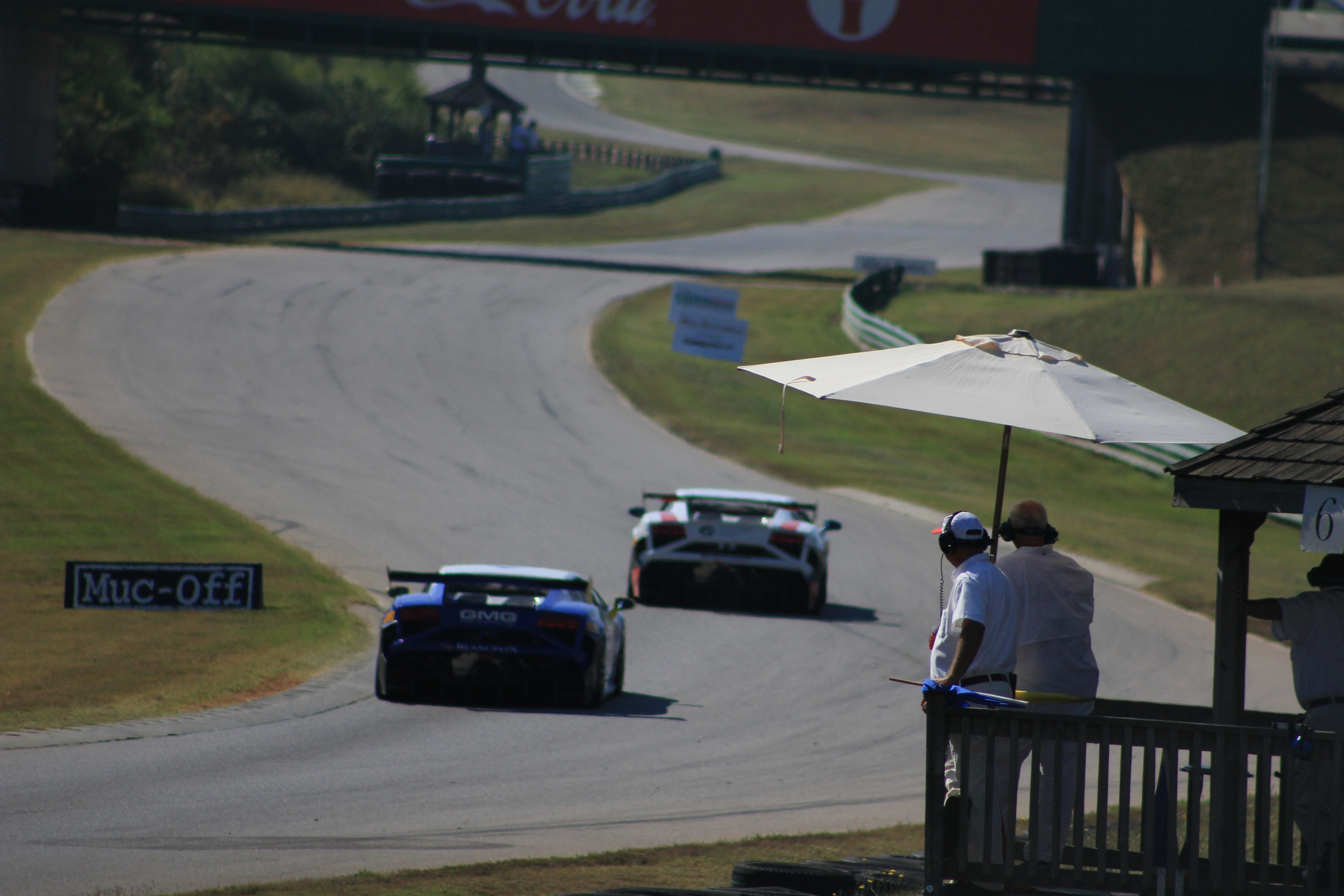
Virginia International Raceway, where the race was held.

American Le Mans Series (ALMS) president Scott Atherton confirmed the race was part of the schedule for the 2013 American Le Mans Series schedule in October 2012. It was the second consecutive year the event was held as part of the American Le Mans Series. The 2013 American Le Mans Series VIR 240 was the ninth of ten scheduled sports car races of 2013 American Le Mans Series. The race was held at the seventeen-turn 3.270 mi (5.263 km) Virginia International Raceway in Alton, Virginia on October 5, 2013.

== Qualifying ==
=== Qualifying results ===
Pole positions in each class are indicated in bold and by ‡.

Pos.	Class	No.	Entry	Driver	Time	Gap	Grid
1	**P1**	**16**	**(United States) Dyson Racing Team**	**(United Kingdom) Guy Smith**	**1:35.965**	—	1‡
2	P1	6	(United States) Muscle Milk Pickett Racing	(Germany) Klaus Graf	1:36.169	+0.204	2
3	**P2**	**551**	**(United States) Level 5 Motorsports**	**(Australia) Ryan Briscoe**	**1:39.796**	**+3.831**	3‡
4	P2	552	(United States) Level 5 Motorsports	(United Kingdom) Marino Franchitti	1:40.307	+4.342	4
5	P2	02	(United States) Extreme Speed Motorsports	(United States) Johannes van Overbeek	1:40.743	+4.778	5
6	**PC**	**52**	**(United States) PR1/Mathiasen Motorsports**	**(United States) Dane Cameron**	**1:41.854**	**+5.889**	6‡
7	PC	05	(United States) CORE Autosport	(United Kingdom) Tom Kimber-Smith	1:42.105	+6.140	7
8	PC	8	(United States) BAR1 Motorsports	(Canada) Kyle Marcelli	1:42.419	+6.454	8
9	P2	01	(United States) Extreme Speed Motorsports	(United States) Scott Sharp	1:42.497	+6.532	9
10	PC	18	(United States) Performance Tech Motorsports	(United States) Tristan Nunez	1:42.574	+6.609	10
11	PC	81	(Germany) DragonSpeed	(Netherlands) Renger van der Zande	1:42.869	+6.904	11
12	PC	7	(United States) BAR1 Motorsports	(United States) Rusty Mitchell	1:43.406	+7.441	12
13	P1	0	(United States) DeltaWing Racing Cars	(United Kingdom) Katherine Legge	1:43.724	+7.759	13
14	**GT**	**55**	**(United States) BMW Team RLL**	**(Belgium) Maxime Martin**	**1:45.978**	**+10.013**	14‡
15	GT	62	(United States) Risi Competizione	(Italy) Matteo Malucelli	1:46.113	+10.148	15^{1}
16	GT	56	(United States) BMW Team RLL	(Germany) Dirk Müller	1:46.174	+10.209	16
17	GT	48	(United States) Paul Miller Racing	(Germany) Marco Holzer	1:46.211	+10.246	17
18	GT	93	(United States) SRT Motorsports	(Canada) Kuno Wittmer	1:46.528	+10.563	18
19	GT	91	(United States) SRT Motorsports	(Germany) Dominik Farnbacher	1:46.568	+10.603	19
20	GT	06	(United States) CORE Autosport	(United States) Patrick Long	1:46.673	+10.708	20
21	GT	3	(United States) Corvette Racing	(Denmark) Jan Magnussen	1:46.923	+10.958	21
22	GT	4	(United States) Corvette Racing	(United States) Tommy Milner	1:47.038	+11.073	22
23	GT	17	(United States) Team Falken Tire	(Germany) Wolf Henzler	1:47.730	+11.765	23
24	GT	23	(United States) Team West/AJR/Boardwalk Ferrari	(United States) Townsend Bell	1:47.761	+11.796	24
25	**GTC**	**66**	**(United States) TRG**	**(Republic of Ireland) Damien Faulkner**	**1:52.213**	**+16.248**	25‡
26	GTC	22	(United States) Alex Job Racing	(Netherlands) Jeroen Bleekemolen	1:52.610	+16.645	26
27	GTC	45	(United States) Flying Lizard Motorsports	(United States) Spencer Pumpelly	1:52.621	+16.656	27
28	GTC	30	(United States) NGT Motorsport	(United Kingdom) Sean Edwards	1:52.927	+16.962	28
29	GTC	31	(United States) NGT Motorsport	(Poland) Kuba Giermaziak	1:53.286	+17.321	29
30	GTC	11	(United States) JDX Racing	(Belgium) Jan Heylen	1:53.425	+17.460	30
31	GTC	44	(United States) Flying Lizard Motorsports	(South Africa) Dion von Moltke	1:53.507	+17.542	31
32	GTC	27	(United States) Dempsey Racing/Del Piero	(United States) Andy Lally	1:53.571	+17.606	32
Sources:

- ^{1} The No. 62 Risi Competizione entry had its fastest lap deleted as penalty for causing a red flag during its qualifying session.

== Race ==
=== Race results ===
Class winners in bold and ‡. Cars failing to complete 70% of their class winner's distance are marked as Not Classified (NC).

Pos	Class	No.	Team	Drivers	Chassis	Tire	Laps	Time/Retired
Pos	Class	No.	Team	Drivers	Engine	Tire	Laps	Time/Retired
1	**P1**	**6**	**(United States) Muscle Milk Pickett Racing**	**(Germany) Klaus Graf (Germany) Lucas Luhr**	**HPD ARX-03c**	MI	**84**	**2:46:11.675‡**
1	**P1**	**6**	**(United States) Muscle Milk Pickett Racing**	**(Germany) Klaus Graf (Germany) Lucas Luhr**	**Honda LM-V8 3.4 L V8**	MI	**84**	**2:46:11.675‡**
2	P1	16	(United States) Dyson Racing Team	(United Kingdom) Johnny Mowlem (United Kingdom) Guy Smith	Lola B12/60	MI	84	+22.846
2	P1	16	(United States) Dyson Racing Team	(United Kingdom) Johnny Mowlem (United Kingdom) Guy Smith	Mazda MZR-R 2.0 L Turbo I4 (Isobutanol)	MI	84	+22.846
3	**P2**	**551**	**(United States) Level 5 Motorsports**	**(United States) Scott Tucker (Australia) Ryan Briscoe**	**HPD ARX-03b**	MI	**83**	**+1 lap‡**
3	**P2**	**551**	**(United States) Level 5 Motorsports**	**(United States) Scott Tucker (Australia) Ryan Briscoe**	**Honda HR28TT 2.8 L Turbo V6**	MI	**83**	**+1 lap‡**
4	P2	01	(United States) Extreme Speed Motorsports	(United States) Anthony Lazzaro (United States) Scott Sharp	HPD ARX-03b	MI	83	+1 lap
4	P2	01	(United States) Extreme Speed Motorsports	(United States) Anthony Lazzaro (United States) Scott Sharp	Honda HR28TT 2.8 L Turbo V6	MI	83	+1 lap
5	P2	552	(United States) Level 5 Motorsports	(United States) Guy Cosmo (United Kingdom) Marino Franchitti (Sweden) Stefan Johansson	HPD ARX-03b	MI	83	+1 lap
5	P2	552	(United States) Level 5 Motorsports	(United States) Guy Cosmo (United Kingdom) Marino Franchitti (Sweden) Stefan Johansson	Honda HR28TT 2.8 L Turbo V6	MI	83	+1 lap
6	**PC**	**8**	**(United States) BAR1 Motorsports**	**(Canada) Kyle Marcelli (Canada) Chris Cumming**	**Oreca FLM09**	C	**81**	**+3 Laps‡**
6	**PC**	**8**	**(United States) BAR1 Motorsports**	**(Canada) Kyle Marcelli (Canada) Chris Cumming**	**Chevrolet 6.2 L V8**	C	**81**	**+3 Laps‡**
7	PC	05	(United States) CORE Autosport	(United States) Jon Bennett (United Kingdom) Tom Kimber-Smith	Oreca FLM09	C	81	+3 Laps
7	PC	05	(United States) CORE Autosport	(United States) Jon Bennett (United Kingdom) Tom Kimber-Smith	Chevrolet 6.2 L V8	C	81	+3 Laps
8	PC	7	(United States) BAR1 Motorsports	(United States) James French (United States) Rusty Mitchell	Oreca FLM09	C	81	+3 Laps
8	PC	7	(United States) BAR1 Motorsports	(United States) James French (United States) Rusty Mitchell	Chevrolet 6.2 L V8	C	81	+3 Laps
9	**GT**	**62**	**(United States) Risi Competizione**	**(Monaco) Olivier Beretta (Italy) Matteo Malucell**	**Ferrari 458 Italia GT2**	MI	**80**	**+4 Laps‡**
9	**GT**	**62**	**(United States) Risi Competizione**	**(Monaco) Olivier Beretta (Italy) Matteo Malucell**	**Ferrari 4.5 L V8**	MI	**80**	**+4 Laps‡**
10	GT	06	(United States) CORE Autosport	(United States) Colin Braun (United States) Patrick Long	Porsche 911 GT3-RSR	MI	79	+5 Laps
10	GT	06	(United States) CORE Autosport	(United States) Colin Braun (United States) Patrick Long	Porsche 4.0 L Flat-6	MI	79	+5 Laps
11	GT	3	(United States) Corvette Racing	(Denmark) Jan Magnussen (Spain) Antonio García	Chevrolet Corvette C6.R	MI	79	+5 Laps
11	GT	3	(United States) Corvette Racing	(Denmark) Jan Magnussen (Spain) Antonio García	Chevrolet 5.5 L V8	MI	79	+5 Laps
12	GT	56	(United States) BMW Team RLL	(Germany) Dirk Müller (United States) John Edwards	BMW Z4 GTE	MI	79	+5 Laps
12	GT	56	(United States) BMW Team RLL	(Germany) Dirk Müller (United States) John Edwards	BMW 4.4 L V8	MI	79	+5 Laps
13	GT	55	(United States) BMW Team RLL	(United States) Bill Auberlen (Belgium) Maxime Martin	BMW Z4 GTE	MI	79	+5 Laps
13	GT	55	(United States) BMW Team RLL	(United States) Bill Auberlen (Belgium) Maxime Martin	BMW 4.4 L V8	MI	79	+5 Laps
14	GT	4	(United States) Corvette Racing	(United Kingdom) Oliver Gavin (United States) Tommy Milner	Chevrolet Corvette C6.R	MI	79	+5 Laps
14	GT	4	(United States) Corvette Racing	(United Kingdom) Oliver Gavin (United States) Tommy Milner	Chevrolet 5.5 L V8	MI	79	+5 Laps
15	GT	91	(United States) SRT Motorsports	(Belgium) Marc Goossens (Germany) Dominik Farnbacher	SRT Viper GTS-R	MI	79	+5 Laps
15	GT	91	(United States) SRT Motorsports	(Belgium) Marc Goossens (Germany) Dominik Farnbacher	SRT 8.0 L V10	MI	79	+5 Laps
16	GT	17	(United States) Team Falken Tire	(United States) Bryan Sellers (Germany) Wolf Henzler	Porsche 911 GT3-RSR	FAL	79	+5 Laps
16	GT	17	(United States) Team Falken Tire	(United States) Bryan Sellers (Germany) Wolf Henzler	Porsche 4.0 L Flat-6	FAL	79	+5 Laps
17 DNF	GT	93	(United States) SRT Motorsports	(Canada) Kuno Wittmer (United States) Jonathan Bomarito	SRT Viper GTS-R	MI	77	Loose Hood
17 DNF	GT	93	(United States) SRT Motorsports	(Canada) Kuno Wittmer (United States) Jonathan Bomarito	SRT 8.0 L V10	MI	77	Loose Hood
18	**GTC**	**66**	**(United States) TRG**	**(United States) Ben Keating (Republic of Ireland) Damien Faulkner**	**Porsche 911 GT3 Cup**	Y	**75**	**+9 Laps‡**
18	**GTC**	**66**	**(United States) TRG**	**(United States) Ben Keating (Republic of Ireland) Damien Faulkner**	**Porsche 4.0 L Flat-6**	Y	**75**	**+9 Laps‡**
19	GTC	22	(United States) Alex Job Racing	(United States) Cooper MacNeil (Netherlands) Jeroen Bleekemolen	Porsche 911 GT3 Cup	Y	75	+9 Laps
19	GTC	22	(United States) Alex Job Racing	(United States) Cooper MacNeil (Netherlands) Jeroen Bleekemolen	Porsche 4.0 L Flat-6	Y	75	+9 Laps
20	GTC	30	(United States) NGT Motorsport	(United States) Henrique Cisneros (United Kingdom) Sean Edwards	Porsche 911 GT3 Cup	Y	75	+9 Laps
20	GTC	30	(United States) NGT Motorsport	(United States) Henrique Cisneros (United Kingdom) Sean Edwards	Porsche 4.0 L Flat-6	Y	75	+9 Laps
21	GTC	11	(United States) JDX Racing	(United States) Mike Hedlund (Belgium) Jan Heylen	Porsche 911 GT3 Cup	Y	75	+9 Laps
21	GTC	11	(United States) JDX Racing	(United States) Mike Hedlund (Belgium) Jan Heylen	Porsche 4.0 L Flat-6	Y	75	+9 Laps
22	GTC	44	(United States) Flying Lizard Motorsports	(United States) Seth Neiman (South Africa) Dion von Moltke	Porsche 911 GT3 Cup	Y	75	+9 Laps
22	GTC	44	(United States) Flying Lizard Motorsports	(United States) Seth Neiman (South Africa) Dion von Moltke	Porsche 4.0 L Flat-6	Y	75	+9 Laps
23	GTC	27	(United States) Dempsey Racing/Del Piero	(United States) Patrick Dempsey (United States) Andy Lally	Porsche 911 GT3 Cup	Y	75	+9 Laps
23	GTC	27	(United States) Dempsey Racing/Del Piero	(United States) Patrick Dempsey (United States) Andy Lally	Porsche 4.0 L Flat-6	Y	75	+9 Laps
24	GTC	45	(United States) Flying Lizard Motorsports	(United States) Spencer Pumpelly (Venezuela) Nelson Canache Jr.	Porsche 911 GT3 Cup	Y	73	+11 Laps
24	GTC	45	(United States) Flying Lizard Motorsports	(United States) Spencer Pumpelly (Venezuela) Nelson Canache Jr.	Porsche 4.0 L Flat-6	Y	73	+11 Laps
25	PC	18	(United States) Performance Tech Motorsports	(United States) Ryan Booth (United States) Tristan Nunez	Oreca FLM09	C	73	+11 Laps
25	PC	18	(United States) Performance Tech Motorsports	(United States) Ryan Booth (United States) Tristan Nunez	Chevrolet 6.2 L V8	C	73	+11 Laps
26	PC	52	(United States) PR1/Mathiasen Motorsports	(United States) Dane Cameron (United States) Mike Guasch	Oreca FLM09	C	69	+15 Laps
26	PC	52	(United States) PR1/Mathiasen Motorsports	(United States) Dane Cameron (United States) Mike Guasch	Chevrolet 6.2 L V8	C	69	+15 Laps
27	PC	81	(Germany) DragonSpeed	(Germany) Mirco Schultis (Netherlands) Renger van der Zande	Oreca FLM09	C	67	+17 Laps
27	PC	81	(Germany) DragonSpeed	(Germany) Mirco Schultis (Netherlands) Renger van der Zande	Chevrolet 6.2 L V8	C	67	+17 Laps
28	GT	23	(United States) Team West/AJR/Boardwalk Ferrari	(United States) Townsend Bell (United States) Bill Sweedler	Ferrari 458 Italia GT2	Y	67	+17 Laps
28	GT	23	(United States) Team West/AJR/Boardwalk Ferrari	(United States) Townsend Bell (United States) Bill Sweedler	Ferrari 4.5 L V8	Y	67	+17 Laps
29 DNF	GT	48	(United States) Paul Miller Racing	(United States) Bryce Miller (Germany) Marco Holzer	Porsche 911 GT3-RSR	MI	50	Crash
29 DNF	GT	48	(United States) Paul Miller Racing	(United States) Bryce Miller (Germany) Marco Holzer	Porsche 4.0 L Flat-6	MI	50	Crash
30 DNF	GTC	31	(United States) NGT Motorsport	(United States) Eduardo Cisneros (Poland) Kuba Giermaziak	Porsche 911 GT3 Cup	Y	47	Crash
30 DNF	GTC	31	(United States) NGT Motorsport	(United States) Eduardo Cisneros (Poland) Kuba Giermaziak	Porsche 4.0 L Flat-6	Y	47	Crash
31 DNF	P1	0	(United States) DeltaWing Racing Cars	(United Kingdom) Katherine Legge (United Kingdom) Andy Meyrick	DeltaWing DWC13	B	40	Alternator Belt
31 DNF	P1	0	(United States) DeltaWing Racing Cars	(United Kingdom) Katherine Legge (United Kingdom) Andy Meyrick	Élan (Mazda) 1.9 L Turbo I4	B	40	Alternator Belt
32 DNF	P2	02	(United States) Extreme Speed Motorsports	(United States) Ed Brown (United States) Johannes van Overbeek	HPD ARX-03b	MI	31	Fire
32 DNF	P2	02	(United States) Extreme Speed Motorsports	(United States) Ed Brown (United States) Johannes van Overbeek	Honda HR28TT 2.8 L Turbo V6	MI	31	Fire

Tyre manufacturers
Key
Symbol	Tyre manufacturer
**B**	Bridgestone
**C**	Continental
**FAL**	Falken Tire
**MI**	Michelin
**Y**	Yokohama

American Le Mans Series
Previous race: International Sports Car Weekend	2013 season	Next race: Petit Le Mans
