= 2013 International Sports Car Weekend =

Sports car race

Map of the Circuit of the Americas - Grand Prix Circuit

The 2013 International Sports Car Weekend was a sports car race held at Circuit of the Americas in Austin, Texas on September 21, 2013. The race was the eighth round of the 2013 American Le Mans Series.

== Background ==
=== Preview ===
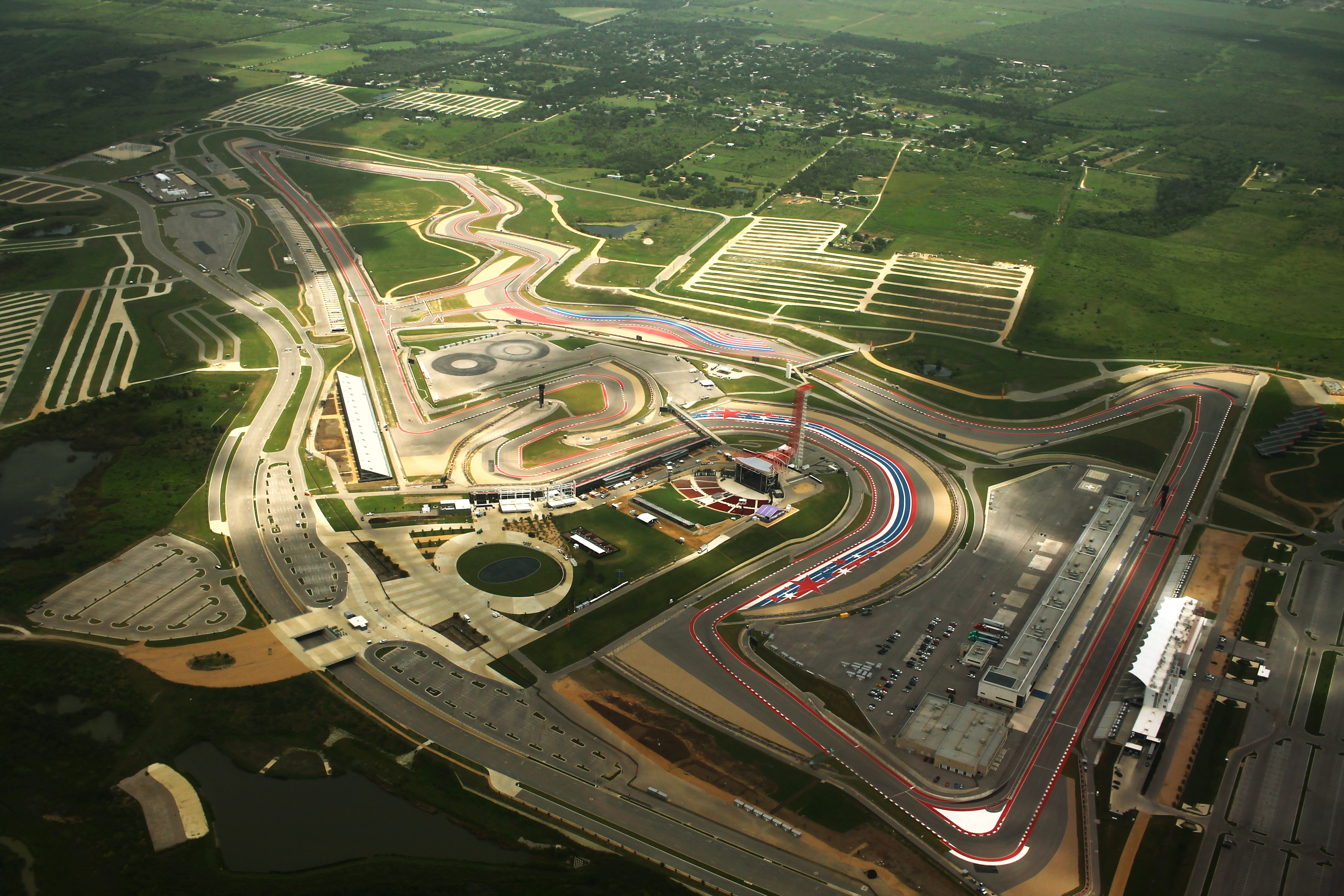
Circuit of the Americas (pictured in 2015), where the race was held.

American Le Mans Series (ALMS) president Scott Atherton confirmed the race was part of the schedule for the 2013 American Le Mans Series schedule in October 2012. It was the first year the event was held as part of the American Le Mans Series. The 2013 International Sports Car Weekend was the eighth of ten scheduled sports car races of 2013 American Le Mans Series. The race was held at the twenty-turn 3.426 mi (5.514 km) Circuit of the Americas in Austin, Texas on September 21, 2013. The event was run alongside the FIA World Endurance Championship event as a double-header.

== Qualifying ==
=== Qualifying results ===
Pole positions in each class are indicated in bold and by ‡.

Pos.	Class	No.	Entry	Driver	Time	Gap	Grid
1	**P1**	**6**	**(United States) Muscle Milk Pickett Racing**	**(Germany) Lucas Luhr**	**2:07.851**	—	1‡
2	P1	16	(United States) Dyson Racing Team	(United States) Chris McMurry	2:12.837	+4.986	2
3	P1	0	(United States) DeltaWing Racing Cars	(United Kingdom) Andy Meyrick	2:15.845	+7.994	3
4	**P2**	**552**	**(United States) Level 5 Motorsports**	**(United Kingdom) Marino Franchitti**	**2:10.573**	**+2.722**	4‡
5	P2	01	(United States) Extreme Speed Motorsports	(United States) Anthony Lazzaro	2:11.869	+4.018	28^{1}
6	P2	02	(United States) Extreme Speed Motorsports	(United States) Johannes van Overbeek	2:12.100	+4.219	29^{1}
7	P2	551	(United States) Level 5 Motorsports	No Time Established			5
8	**PC**	**81**	**(Germany) DragonSpeed**	**(Netherlands) Renger van der Zande**	**2:17.865**	**+10.014**	6‡
9	PC	5	(United States) Starworks Motorsport	(United Kingdom) Ryan Dalziel	2:18.929	+11.078	30^{1}
10	PC	8	(United States) BAR1 Motorsports	(Canada) Kyle Marcelli	2:19.782	+11.931	7
11	PC	9	(United States) RSR Racing	(Brazil) Bruno Junqueira	2:20.018	+12.167	31^{1}
12	PC	05	(United States) CORE Autosport	(United Kingdom) Tom Kimber-Smith	2:20.340	+12.489	8
13	PC	52	(United States) PR1/Mathiasen Motorsports	(United States) Dane Cameron	2:20.722	+12.871	32^{1}
14	PC	18	(United States) Performance Tech Motorsports	(United States) Tristan Nunez	2:20.935	+13.084	9
15	PC	7	(United States) BAR1 Motorsports	(United States) Rusty Mitchell	2:22.438	+14.587	10
16	**GT**	**55**	**(United States) BMW Team RLL**	**(United States) Joey Hand**	**2:17.178**	**+9.327**	11‡
17	GT	3	(United States) Corvette Racing	(Spain) Antonio García	2:17.442	+9.591	12
18	GT	4	(United States) Corvette Racing	(United Kingdom) Oliver Gavin	2:17.594	+9.743	13
19	GT	56	(United States) BMW Team RLL	(United States) John Edwards	2:18.002	+10.151	14
20	GT	06	(United States) CORE Autosport	(United States) Patrick Long	2:19.167	+11.316	15
21	GT	93	(United States) SRT Motorsports	(United States) Jonathan Bomarito	2:19.246	+11.395	16
22	GT	48	(United States) Paul Miller Racing	(United States) Bryce Miller	2:19.462	+11.611	17
23	GT	62	(United States) Risi Competizione	(Italy) Matteo Malucelli	2:19.834	+11.983	33^{1}
24	GT	91	(United States) SRT Motorsports	(Belgium) Marc Goossens	2:20.088	+12.237	18
25	GT	17	(United States) Team Falken Tire	(United States) Bryan Sellers	2:21.134	+13.283	19
26	GT	23	(United States) Team West/AJR/Boardwalk Ferrari	(United States) Townsend Bell	2:21.704	+13.853	20
27	**GTC**	**66**	**(United States) TRG**	**(Republic of Ireland) Damien Faulkner**	**2:27.816**	**+19.965**	21‡
28	GTC	30	(United States) NGT Motorsport	(United Kingdom) Sean Edwards	2:27.880	+20.029	22
29	GTC	22	(United States) Alex Job Racing	(Netherlands) Jeroen Bleekemolen	2:27.920	+20.069	23
30	GTC	27	(United States) Dempsey Racing/Del Piero	(United States) Andy Lally	2:28.533	+20.682	24
31	GTC	44	(United States) Flying Lizard Motorsports	(South Africa) Dion von Moltke	2:28.618	+20.767	25
32	GTC	11	(United States) JDX Racing	(Belgium) Jan Heylen	2:28.692	+20.841	26
33	GTC	45	(United States) Flying Lizard Motorsports	(United States) Spencer Pumpelly	2:29.353	+21.502	27

Notes:

- **^1** – The No. 01 and Extreme Speed Motorsports, the No. 5 Starworks Motorsport, the No. 9 RSR Racing, the No. 52 PR1/Mathiasen Motorsports, and the No. 62 Risi Competizione Ferrari were sent to the rear of their respective class fields because their drivers did not meet minimum qualifying time.

== Race ==
=== Race results ===
Class winners in bold and ‡. Cars failing to complete 70% of their class winner's distance are marked as Not Classified (NC).

Pos	Class	No.	Team	Drivers	Chassis	Tire	Laps	Time/Retired
Pos	Class	No.	Team	Drivers	Engine	Tire	Laps	Time/Retired
1	**P1**	**6**	**(United States) Muscle Milk Pickett Racing**	**(Germany) Klaus Graf (Germany) Lucas Luhr**	**HPD ARX-03c**	M	**83**	**2:45:05.710‡**
1	**P1**	**6**	**(United States) Muscle Milk Pickett Racing**	**(Germany) Klaus Graf (Germany) Lucas Luhr**	**Honda LM-V8 3.4 L V8**	M	**83**	**2:45:05.710‡**
2	P1	16	(United States) Dyson Racing Team	(Canada) Tony Burgess (United States) Chris McMurry	Lola B12/60	M	81	+2 Laps
2	P1	16	(United States) Dyson Racing Team	(Canada) Tony Burgess (United States) Chris McMurry	Mazda MZR-R 2.0 L Turbo I4 (Isobutanol)	M	81	+2 Laps
3	**P2**	**551**	**(United States) Level 5 Motorsports**	**(United States) Scott Tucker (Australia) Ryan Briscoe**	**HPD ARX-03b**	M	**80**	**+3 Laps‡**
3	**P2**	**551**	**(United States) Level 5 Motorsports**	**(United States) Scott Tucker (Australia) Ryan Briscoe**	**Honda HR28TT 2.8 L Turbo V6**	M	**80**	**+3 Laps‡**
4	P2	552	(United States) Level 5 Motorsports	(United States) Guy Cosmo (United Kingdom) Marino Franchitti (United States) Scott Tucker	HPD ARX-03b	M	80	+3 Laps
4	P2	552	(United States) Level 5 Motorsports	(United States) Guy Cosmo (United Kingdom) Marino Franchitti (United States) Scott Tucker	Honda HR28TT 2.8 L Turbo V6	M	80	+3 Laps
5	P2	02	(United States) Extreme Speed Motorsports	(United States) Ed Brown (United States) Johannes van Overbeek	HPD ARX-03b	M	79	+4 Laps
5	P2	02	(United States) Extreme Speed Motorsports	(United States) Ed Brown (United States) Johannes van Overbeek	Honda HR28TT 2.8 L Turbo V6	M	79	+4 Laps
6	P2	01	(United States) Extreme Speed Motorsports	(United States) Anthony Lazzaro (United States) Scott Sharp	HPD ARX-03b	M	79	+4 Laps
6	P2	01	(United States) Extreme Speed Motorsports	(United States) Anthony Lazzaro (United States) Scott Sharp	Honda HR28TT 2.8 L Turbo V6	M	79	+4 Laps
7	**PC**	**8**	**(United States) BAR1 Motorsports**	**(Canada) Kyle Marcelli (Canada) Chris Cumming**	**Oreca FLM09**	C	**79**	**+4 Laps‡**
7	**PC**	**8**	**(United States) BAR1 Motorsports**	**(Canada) Kyle Marcelli (Canada) Chris Cumming**	**Chevrolet 6.2 L V8**	C	**79**	**+4 Laps‡**
8	PC	52	(United States) PR1/Mathiasen Motorsports	(United States) Dane Cameron (United States) Mike Guasch	Oreca FLM09	C	79	+4 Laps
8	PC	52	(United States) PR1/Mathiasen Motorsports	(United States) Dane Cameron (United States) Mike Guasch	Chevrolet 6.2 L V8	C	79	+4 Laps
9	PC	05	(United States) CORE Autosport	(United States) Jon Bennett (United Kingdom) Tom Kimber-Smith	Oreca FLM09	C	79	+4 Laps
9	PC	05	(United States) CORE Autosport	(United States) Jon Bennett (United Kingdom) Tom Kimber-Smith	Chevrolet 6.2 L V8	C	79	+4 Laps
10	PC	18	(United States) Performance Tech Motorsports	(United States) Tristan Nunez (United States) Charlie Shears	Oreca FLM09	C	78	+5 Laps
10	PC	18	(United States) Performance Tech Motorsports	(United States) Tristan Nunez (United States) Charlie Shears	Chevrolet 6.2 L V8	C	78	+5 Laps
11	PC	81	(Germany) DragonSpeed	(Germany) Mirco Schultis (Netherlands) Renger van der Zande	Oreca FLM09	C	78	+5 Laps
11	PC	81	(Germany) DragonSpeed	(Germany) Mirco Schultis (Netherlands) Renger van der Zande	Chevrolet 6.2 L V8	C	78	+5 Laps
12	PC	9	(United States) RSR Racing	(Brazil) Bruno Junqueira (Denmark) David Heinemeier Hansson	Oreca FLM09	C	78	+5 Laps
12	PC	9	(United States) RSR Racing	(Brazil) Bruno Junqueira (Denmark) David Heinemeier Hansson	Chevrolet 6.2 L V8	C	78	+5 Laps
13	**GT**	**3**	**(United States) Corvette Racing**	**(Denmark) Jan Magnussen (Spain) Antonio García**	**Chevrolet Corvette C6.R**	M	**78**	**+5 Laps‡**
13	**GT**	**3**	**(United States) Corvette Racing**	**(Denmark) Jan Magnussen (Spain) Antonio García**	**Chevrolet 5.5 L V8**	M	**78**	**+5 Laps‡**
14	GT	93	(United States) SRT Motorsports	(Canada) Kuno Wittmer (United States) Jonathan Bomarito	SRT Viper GTS-R	M	78	+5 Laps
14	GT	93	(United States) SRT Motorsports	(Canada) Kuno Wittmer (United States) Jonathan Bomarito	SRT 8.0 L V10	M	78	+5 Laps
15	GT	56	(United States) BMW Team RLL	(Germany) Dirk Müller (United States) John Edwards	BMW Z4 GTE	M	78	+5 Laps
15	GT	56	(United States) BMW Team RLL	(Germany) Dirk Müller (United States) John Edwards	BMW 4.4 L V8	M	78	+5 Laps
16	GT	55	(United States) BMW Team RLL	(United States) Bill Auberlen (United States) Joey Hand	BMW Z4 GTE	M	77	+6 Laps
16	GT	55	(United States) BMW Team RLL	(United States) Bill Auberlen (United States) Joey Hand	BMW 4.4 L V8	M	77	+6 Laps
17	GT	91	(United States) SRT Motorsports	(Belgium) Marc Goossens (Germany) Dominik Farnbacher	SRT Viper GTS-R	M	77	+6 Laps
17	GT	91	(United States) SRT Motorsports	(Belgium) Marc Goossens (Germany) Dominik Farnbacher	SRT 8.0 L V10	M	77	+6 Laps
18	GT	62	(United States) Risi Competizione	(Monaco) Olivier Beretta (Italy) Matteo Malucelli	Ferrari 458 Italia GT2	M	77	+6 Laps
18	GT	62	(United States) Risi Competizione	(Monaco) Olivier Beretta (Italy) Matteo Malucelli	Ferrari 4.5 L V8	M	77	+6 Laps
19	GT	17	(United States) Team Falken Tire	(United States) Bryan Sellers (Germany) Wolf Henzler	Porsche 911 GT3-RSR	F	76	+7 Laps
19	GT	17	(United States) Team Falken Tire	(United States) Bryan Sellers (Germany) Wolf Henzler	Porsche 4.0 L Flat-6	F	76	+7 Laps
20	GT	23	(United States) Team West/AJR/Boardwalk Ferrari	(United States) Townsend Bell (United States) Bill Sweedler	Ferrari 458 Italia GT2	Y	75	+8 Laps
20	GT	23	(United States) Team West/AJR/Boardwalk Ferrari	(United States) Townsend Bell (United States) Bill Sweedler	Ferrari 4.5 L V8	Y	75	+8 Laps
21	**GTC**	**66**	**(United States) TRG**	**(United States) Ben Keating (Republic of Ireland) Damien Faulkner**	**Porsche 911 GT3 Cup**	Y	**72**	**+11 Laps‡**
21	**GTC**	**66**	**(United States) TRG**	**(United States) Ben Keating (Republic of Ireland) Damien Faulkner**	**Porsche 4.0 L Flat-6**	Y	**72**	**+11 Laps‡**
22	GTC	30	(United States) NGT Motorsport	(United States) Henrique Cisneros (United Kingdom) Sean Edwards	Porsche 911 GT3 Cup	Y	72	+11 Laps
22	GTC	30	(United States) NGT Motorsport	(United States) Henrique Cisneros (United Kingdom) Sean Edwards	Porsche 4.0 L Flat-6	Y	72	+11 Laps
23	GTC	27	(United States) Dempsey Racing/Del Piero	(United States) Patrick Dempsey (United States) Andy Lally	Porsche 911 GT3 Cup	Y	72	+11 Laps
23	GTC	27	(United States) Dempsey Racing/Del Piero	(United States) Patrick Dempsey (United States) Andy Lally	Porsche 4.0 L Flat-6	Y	72	+11 Laps
24	GTC	11	(United States) JDX Racing	(United States) Mike Hedlund (Belgium) Jan Heylen	Porsche 911 GT3 Cup	Y	72	+11 Laps
24	GTC	11	(United States) JDX Racing	(United States) Mike Hedlund (Belgium) Jan Heylen	Porsche 4.0 L Flat-6	Y	72	+11 Laps
25	GTC	45	(United States) Flying Lizard Motorsports	(United States) Spencer Pumpelly (Venezuela) Nelson Canache Jr.	Porsche 911 GT3 Cup	Y	72	+11 Laps
25	GTC	45	(United States) Flying Lizard Motorsports	(United States) Spencer Pumpelly (Venezuela) Nelson Canache Jr.	Porsche 4.0 L Flat-6	Y	72	+11 Laps
26	GTC	22	(United States) Alex Job Racing	(United States) Cooper MacNeil (Netherlands) Jeroen Bleekemolen	Porsche 911 GT3 Cup	Y	71	+12 Laps
26	GTC	22	(United States) Alex Job Racing	(United States) Cooper MacNeil (Netherlands) Jeroen Bleekemolen	Porsche 4.0 L Flat-6	Y	71	+12 Laps
27	GTC	44	(United States) Flying Lizard Motorsports	(United States) Seth Neiman (South Africa) Dion von Moltke	Porsche 911 GT3 Cup	Y	71	+12 Laps
27	GTC	44	(United States) Flying Lizard Motorsports	(United States) Seth Neiman (South Africa) Dion von Moltke	Porsche 4.0 L Flat-6	Y	71	+12 Laps
28 DNF	PC	7	(United States) BAR1 Motorsports	(United States) Tomy Drissi (United States) Rusty Mitchell	Oreca FLM09	C	69	Suspension
28 DNF	PC	7	(United States) BAR1 Motorsports	(United States) Tomy Drissi (United States) Rusty Mitchell	Chevrolet 6.2 L V8	C	69	Suspension
29 DNF	P1	0	(United States) DeltaWing Racing Cars	(United Kingdom) Katherine Legge (United Kingdom) Andy Meyrick	DeltaWing DWC13	B	66	Gearbox
29 DNF	P1	0	(United States) DeltaWing Racing Cars	(United Kingdom) Katherine Legge (United Kingdom) Andy Meyrick	Élan (Mazda) 1.9 L Turbo I4	B	66	Gearbox
30	GT	48	(United States) Paul Miller Racing	(United States) Bryce Miller (Germany) Marco Holzer	Porsche 911 GT3-RSR	M	56	+27 Laps
30	GT	48	(United States) Paul Miller Racing	(United States) Bryce Miller (Germany) Marco Holzer	Porsche 4.0 L Flat-6	M	56	+27 Laps
31 DNF	GT	06	(United States) CORE Autosport	(United States) Colin Braun (United States) Patrick Long	Porsche 911 GT3-RSR	M	53	Transmission
31 DNF	GT	06	(United States) CORE Autosport	(United States) Colin Braun (United States) Patrick Long	Porsche 4.0 L Flat-6	M	53	Transmission
32 DNF	PC	5	(United States) Starworks Motorsport	(United Kingdom) Ryan Dalziel (United States) John Pew	Oreca FLM09	C	45	Overheating
32 DNF	PC	5	(United States) Starworks Motorsport	(United Kingdom) Ryan Dalziel (United States) John Pew	Chevrolet 6.2 L V8	C	45	Overheating
33 DNF	GT	4	(United States) Corvette Racing	(United Kingdom) Oliver Gavin (United States) Tommy Milner	Chevrolet Corvette C6.R	M	26	Gearbox
33 DNF	GT	4	(United States) Corvette Racing	(United Kingdom) Oliver Gavin (United States) Tommy Milner	Chevrolet 5.5 L V8	M	26	Gearbox

Tyre manufacturers
Key
Symbol	Tyre manufacturer
**B**	Bridgestone
**C**	Continental
**F**	Falken Tire
**M**	Michelin
**Y**	Yokohama

American Le Mans Series
Previous race: Baltimore Sports Car Challenge 245	2013 season	Next race: American Le Mans Series VIR 240
