= Dion von Moltke =

American-born race car driver (born 1990)

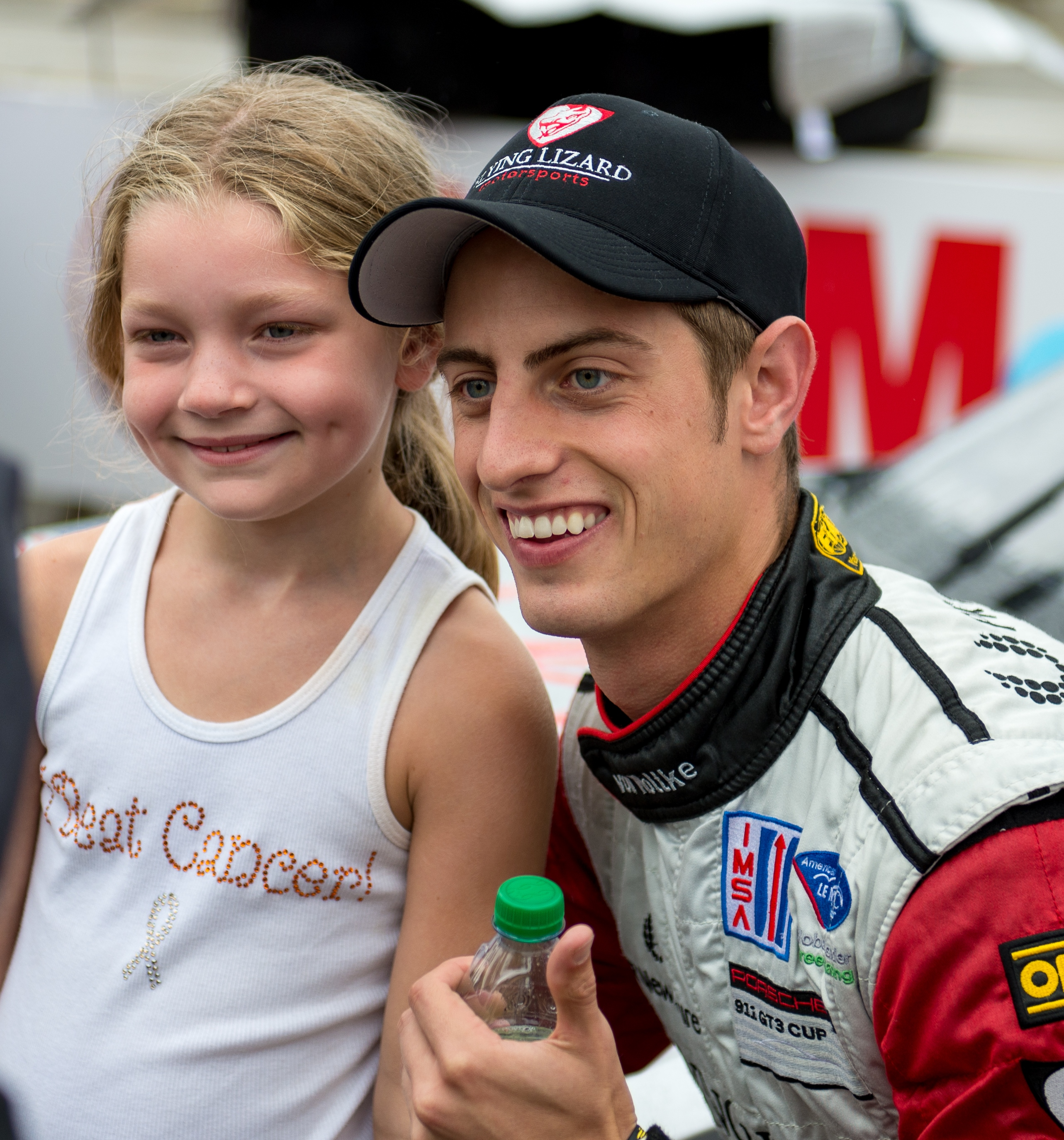
- Race car driver Dion von Moltke in 2013
- Nationality: (South Africa) South African (United States) American
- Born: 27 July 1990 (age 36) The Woodlands, Texas, United States

United SportsCar Championship career
- Current team: Paul Miller Racing
- Categorisation: FIA Silver
- Car number: 48
- Former teams: Flying Lizard Motorsports, Racers Edge, MCM Racing, Starworks Motorsport, Doran Racing, Flat 6 Motorsports, Mühlner Motorsport, The Racer's Group, APR Motorsports, Alex Job Racing
- Wins: 5 (1 Rolex Sports Car Series, 4 American Le Mans Series)
- Poles: 4

Previous series
- Continental Tire Sports Car Challenge, Rolex Sports Car Series, American Le Mans Series

Dion von Moltke (born 27 July 1990, in The Woodlands, Texas) is an American-born race car driver who has participated under a South African racing license for the majority of his career. Von Moltke currently competes in the IMSA WeatherTech Championship GTD class with Paul Miller Racing in the #48 Audi R8 LMS with co-driver Christopher Haase. His early career involved an upbringing in karts and the Skip Barber National Championship.

== Early life ==
Von Moltke was born on 27 July 1990, in The Woodlands, Texas. His parents are both from South Africa, and he has lived in Sydney, Australia, Los Angeles, California, and Dallas, Texas, before moving to Miami, Florida. While enrolled in a laptop-based school following their move to Miami in 2003, von Moltke's father offered him a choice of a gaming computer or a go kart to make up for the relocation, which led to the start of von Moltke's racing career. He later went on to attend Florida International University, joined the Pi Kappa Phi fraternity, and began his professional career in 2008.

== Racing career ==
=== Karts ===
Von Moltke's karting career began in 2004, when he finished second in the EasyKart 100 cc Summer Championship Series. His first victory came at the Cope DeLas America's karting championship in San Carlos, Venezuela. In 2005, von Moltke won the EasyKart 100 cc Winter Championship Series and the WKA Florida State Regional Championship.

=== Skip Barber ===
Von Moltke moved to the Skip Barber National Championship in 2007 after completing formula car schooling at the Skip Barber Racing School. He earned several podium finishes over the course of the season, and was named the most improved driver at the school in 2007. In 2008, von Moltke won the inaugural Skip Barber Mazda Speed Challenge at Mazda Raceway Laguna Seca.

=== Sports Car Racing ===
Von Moltke signed with APR Motorsports to drive a Volkswagen GTI in the Grand-Am Continental Tire Sports Car Challenge in 2008. He also made his Grand-Am Rolex Sports Car Series debut at New Jersey Motorsports Park with Racers Edge Motorsports.

In 2009, von Moltke remained with APR in the Challenge Series, while also competing in Rolex with MCM Racing Porsche. He earned his first victory in Challenge at Watkins Glen International co-driving with Mike Sweeney, followed by victories at Mid-Ohio and Miller Motorsports Park. In 2010, von Moltke participated in the Daytona Prototype class of the Rolex Series with Doran Racing for the full season and earned the Rookie of the Year title.

Von Moltke returned to the GT category in 2011, driving for the German Mühlner Motorsport Porsche team at the Rolex 24 at Daytona, backed by PR Newswire and South African Airways. He also began racing in the American Le Mans Series' GTC category for Porsches with The Racer's Group. He completed the American Le Mans Series season with a win at Lime Rock Park and was fifth in the championship standings.

For 2012, von Moltke returned to APR Motorsport as the team moved into the Rolex GT category with an Audi R8 LMS, partnered with Jim Norman. A switch to the Alex Job Racing team in the American Le Mans GTC category earned von Moltke a class victory at the 12 Hours of Sebring with co-drivers Townsend Bell and Bill Sweedler.

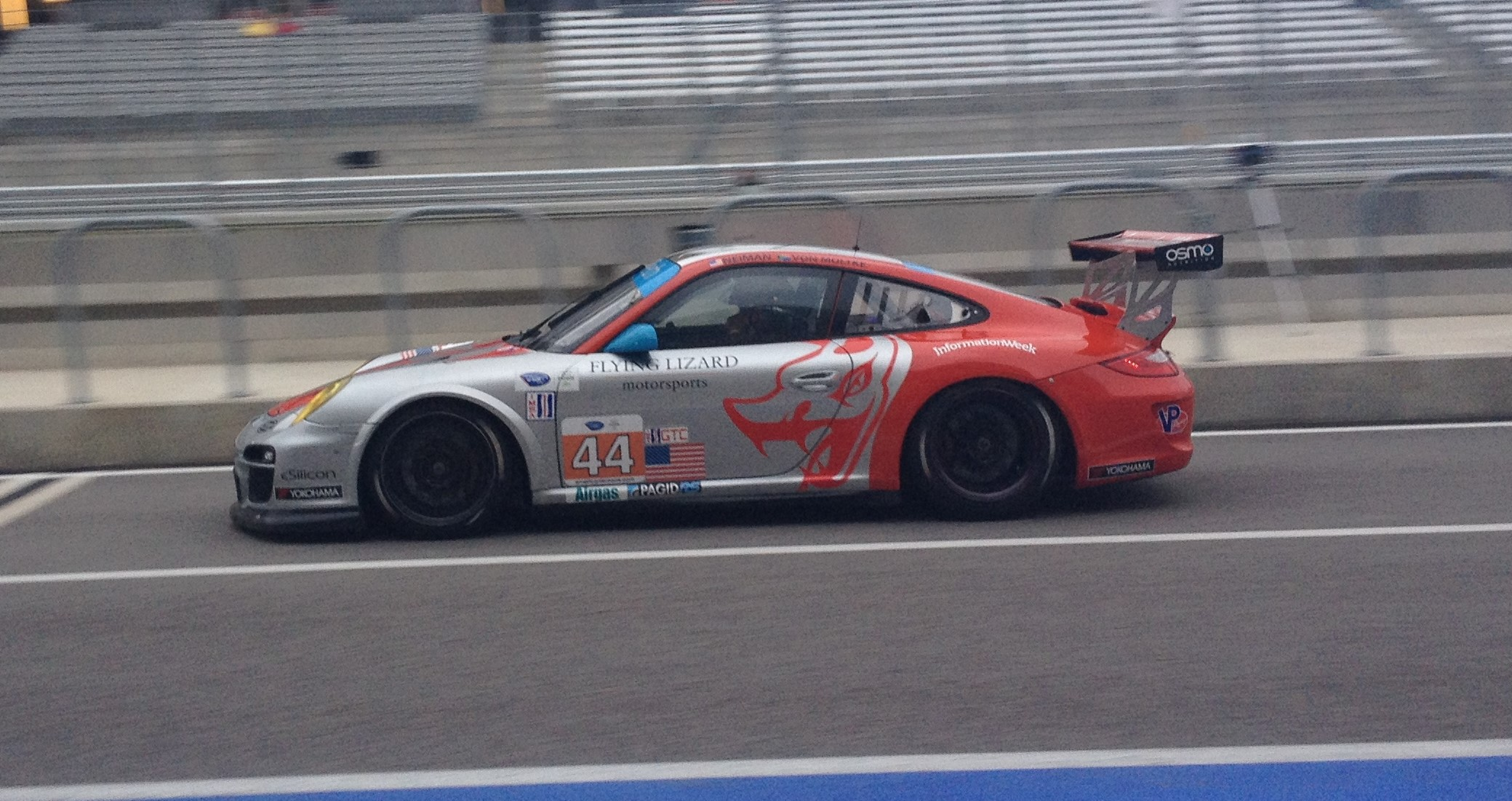
von Moltke in the Flying Lizard Porsche in 2013

In 2013, von Moltke took the GT-class win at the 24 Hours of Daytona then a GTC class win at Sebring and followed it up with another GTC class win at the Grand Prix of Baltimore.

In 2014, von Moltke signed with the Flying Lizard Motorsports team for the full 2014 TUDOR United SportsCar Championship season behind the wheel of the No. 35 Audi R8 LMS. Although the #35 kicked off the season with three top five finishes, bad luck and Balance of Performance issues plagued the team, finishing ninth in the GTD championship standings.

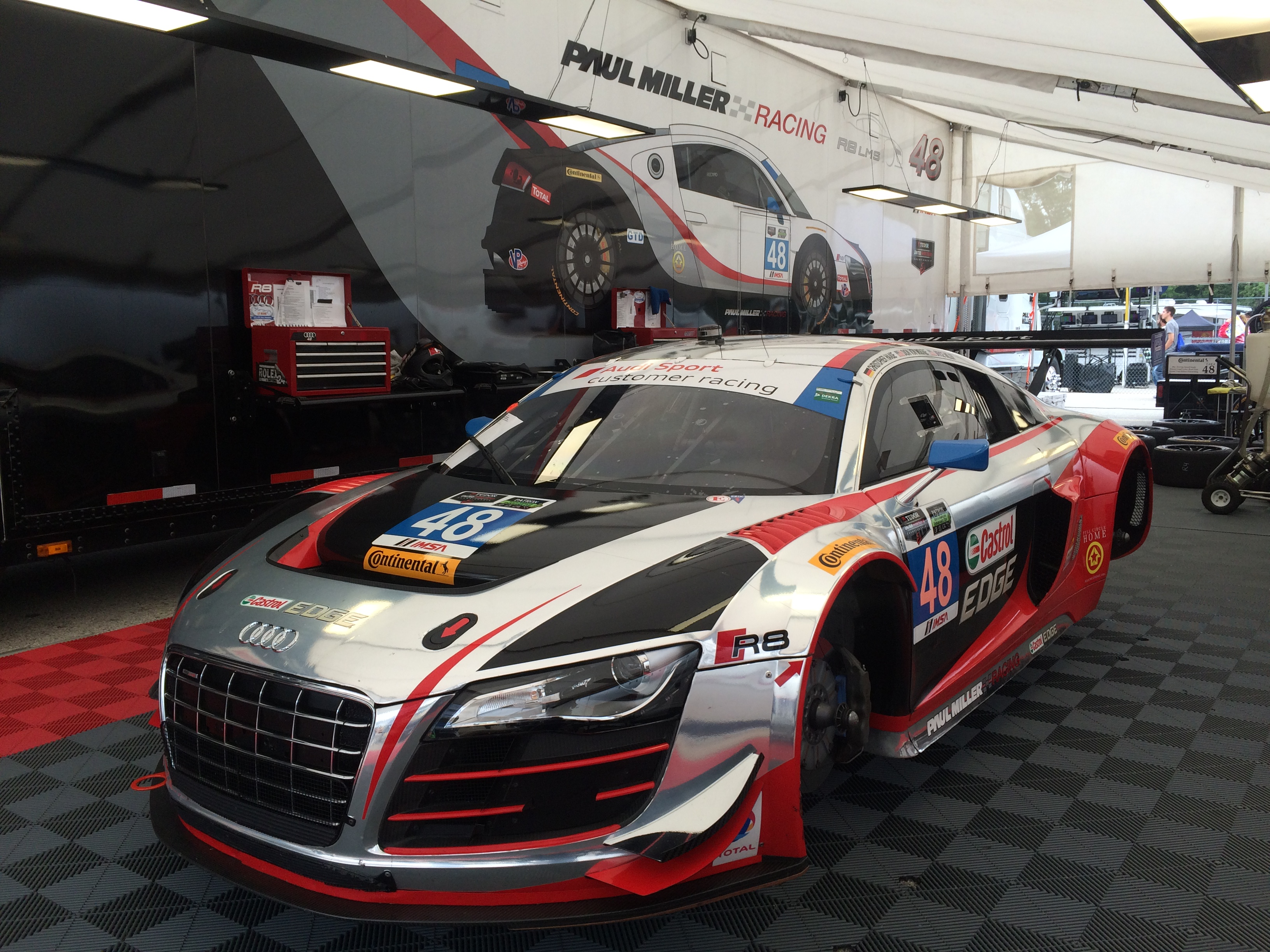
Dion von Moltke's 2015 Paul Miller Racing Audi R8 LMS

In January 2015, it was announced von Molkte would join Paul Miller Racing for the entirety of the race season, again competing in the TUDOR United SportsCar Championship's GTD class. Von Moltke earned his first career TUDOR United SportsCar Championship pole position at the Detroit Belle Isle Grand Prix, where he and co-driver Christopher Haase finished third in the GTD class. He earned his second pole position three races later at Lime Rock Park. Von Moltke led his entire stint, but the car was later taken out by another competitor, ending their race. The Paul Miller Racing duo finished third in the GTD class championship, with von Moltke earning a total of four pole positions.

== Personal life ==
As of 2012, von Moltke resided in Coral Gables, Florida, while attending Florida International University while participating in motorsport. He is a member of one of the university's fraternities. Von Moltke is also involved in a training program for new drivers in motorsport. He is also involved with the Best Buddies International charity. In November 2014, von Moltke spoke at a TEDx Talk night of Fearless Journeys at Florida International University.

== Results ==
=== Continental Tire Sports Car Challenge ===
Year	Team	Class	1	2	3	4	5	6	7	8	9	10	11	Rank	Points
2008	APR Motorsport	ST	DIS; 41	LRP; 14	MOS; 29	MOH; 31	WGI; NA	BAR; NA	IOW; 23	TRR; 32	NJP; 15	UTA; 2	VIR; 24	44th	82
2008	Rehagen Racing	GS	DIS; NA	LRP; NA	MOS; NA	MOH; NA	WGI; NA	BAR; 12	IOW; NA	TRR; NA	NJP; NA	UTA; NA	VIR; NA	70th	19
2009	APR Motorsport	ST	DIS; NA	HOM; NA	NJP; NA	LAG; 15	LRP; 21	WGI; 1	MOH; 1	BAR; 15	TRR; 7	UTA; 1	VIR; NA	44th	112
2010	Mitchum Motorsports	GS	DIS; NA	HOM; NA	BAR; NA	VIR; NA	LRP; 8	WGI; NA	MOH; NA	NJP; NA	TRR; NA	UTA; NA		71st	23
2011	Doran Racing	ST	DIS; NA	HOM; 19	BAR; NA	VIR; NA	LRP; NA	WGI; NA	ROA; NA	LAG; NA	NJP; NA	MOH; NA		78th	12
2012	APR Motorsport	ST	DIS; NA	BAR; NA	HOM; 19	NJP; NA	MOH; NA	ROA; NA	WGI; NA	IND; NA	LAG; NA	LRP; NA		81st	12

=== Rolex SportsCar Series ===
Year	Team	Class	1	2	3	4	5	6	7	8	9	10	11	12	13	14	15	Rank	Points
2008	Racers Edge Motorsports	GT	DIS; NA	HOM; NA	MEX; NA	VIR; NA	LAG; NA	LRP; NA	WGI; NA	MOH; NA	DIS; NA	BAR; NA	MON; NA	WGI; NA	SNO; NA	NJP; 13	UTA; NA	89th	18
2009	Racers Edge Motorsports	GT	DIS; 12	VIR; NA	NJP; NA	LAG; NA	WGI; NA	MOH; NA	DIS; NA	BAR; NA	WGI; NA	MON; NA	UTA; NA	HOM; NA				34th	62
2009	Battery Tender/MCM Racing	GT	DIS; NA	VIR; 12	NJP; 6	LAG; NA	WGI; NA	MOH; NA	DIS; NA	BAR; NA	WGI; NA	MON; NA	UTA; NA	HOM; NA				34th	62
2009	BMW Riley	DP	DIS; NA	VIR; NA	NJP; NA	LAG; NA	WGI; NA	MOH; NA	DIS; NA	BAR; NA	WGI; NA	MON; NA	UTA; NA	HOM; 13				48th	18
2010	Starworks Motorsport	DP	DIS; 12	VIR; NA	NJP; NA	LAG; NA	WGI; NA	MOH; NA	DIS; NA	BAR; NA	WGI; NA	MON; NA	UTA; NA	HOM; NA				12th	277
2010	Doran Racing	DP	DIS; NA	HOM; 9	BAR; 4	VIR; 8	LRP; 11	WGI; 9	MOH; 7	DIS; 5	NJP; 6	WGI; 9	MON; 9	UTA; 7				12th	277
2011	Mühlner Motorsports	GT	DIS; 9	HOM; NA	BAR; NA	VIR; NA	LRP; NA	WGI; NA	ROA; NA	LAG; NA	NJP; NA	WGI; NA	MON; NA	MOH; NA				51st	22
2012	APR Motorsport	GT	DIS; 31	BAR; 11	HOM; 17	NJP; 14	DET; 11	MOH; 13	ROA; 12	WGI; 18	IMS; 18	WGI; 13	MON; 9	LAG; 12	LRP; 2			13th	241
2013	Alex Job Racing	GT	DIS; 1	AUS; NA	BAR; NA	ATL; NA	DET; NA	MOH; NA	WGI; NA	IMS; NA	ROA; NA	KAN; NA	LAG; NA	LRP; NA				16th	145
2013	Mühlner Motorsports	GT	DIS; NA	AUS; 9	BAR; 7	ATL; NA	DET; 9	MOH; 11	WGI; NA	IMS; NA	ROA; NA	KAN; NA	LAG; NA	LRP; NA				16th	145
2013	Audi Sport Customer Racing	GT	DIS; NA	AUS; NA	BAR; NA	ATL; NA	DET; NA	MOH; NA	WGI; 9	IMS; NA	ROA; NA	KAN; NA	LAG; NA	LRP; NA				16th	145

=== American Le Mans Series ===
Year	Team	Class	1	2	3	4	5	6	7	8	9	10	Rank	Points
2011	The Racers Group	GTC	SEB; 5	LBGP; 5	LRP; 1	MOS; 2	MOH; 7	ROA; 6	BAL; 5	LAG; 6	RAT; 4		5th	108
2012	Battery Tender/William Rast	GTC	SEB; 1	LBGP; NA	LAG; NA	LRP; NA	MOS; NA	MOH; NA	ROA; NA	BAL; NA	VIR; NA	RAT; NA	16th	38
2012	Alex Job Racing	GTC	SEB; NA	LBGP; NA	LAG; NA	LRP; NA	MOS; NA	MOH; NA	ROA; NA	BAL; NA	VIR; NA	RAT; 5	16th	38
2013	Alex Job Racing	GTC	SEB; 1	LBGP; NA	LAG; NA	LRP; NA	MOS; NA	ROA; NA	BAL; NA	AUS; NA	VIR; NA	RAT; NA	9th	81
2013	Flying Lizard Motorsports	GTC	SEB; NA	LBGP; 3	LAG; 9	LRP; 6	MOS; 7	ROA; 5	BAL; 1	AUS; 7	VIR; 5	RAT; 5	9th	81

=== TUDOR United SportsCar Championship ===
Year	Team	Class	1	2	3	4	5	6	7	8	9	10	11	Rank	Points
2014	Flying Lizard Motorsports	GTD	DIS; 5	SEB; 5	LAG; 5	DET; 13	WGI; 7	MOS; 14	IND; 13	ROA; 8	VIR; 7	AUS; 13	RAT; 12	11th	252
2015	Paul Miller Racing	GTD	DIS; 5	SEB; 5	LAG; 2	DET; 3	WGI; 3	MOS -	LRP; 10	ROA; 6	VIR; 5	AUS; 3	RAT; 10	3rd	277
