= 2007 Detroit Sports Car Challenge =

Automobile race

The Raceway on Belle Isle in 2007

The 2007 Detroit Sports Car Challenge presented by Bosch was the tenth round of the 2007 American Le Mans Series season. It took place at Belle Isle Circuit, Michigan on September 1, 2007.

== Official results ==
Class winners in bold. Cars failing to complete 70% of winner's distance marked as Not Classified (NC).

Pos	Class	No	Team	Drivers	Chassis	Tyre	Laps
Pos	Class	No	Team	Drivers	Engine	Tyre	Laps
1	**LMP2**	**7**	**(United States) Penske Racing**	**(France) Romain Dumas (Germany) Timo Bernhard**	**Porsche RS Spyder Evo**	MI	**106**
1	**LMP2**	**7**	**(United States) Penske Racing**	**(France) Romain Dumas (Germany) Timo Bernhard**	**Porsche MR6 3.4L V8**	MI	**106**
2	**LMP1**	**2**	**(United States) Audi Sport North America**	**(Italy) Emanuele Pirro (Germany) Marco Werner**	**Audi R10 TDI**	MI	**106**
2	**LMP1**	**2**	**(United States) Audi Sport North America**	**(Italy) Emanuele Pirro (Germany) Marco Werner**	**Audi 5.5L TDI V12 (Diesel)**	MI	**106**
3	LMP1	1	(United States) Audi Sport North America	(Italy) Rinaldo Capello (United Kingdom) Allan McNish	Audi R10 TDI	MI	106
3	LMP1	1	(United States) Audi Sport North America	(Italy) Rinaldo Capello (United Kingdom) Allan McNish	Audi 5.5L TDI V12 (Diesel)	MI	106
4	LMP2	16	(United States) Dyson Racing	(United States) Butch Leitzinger (United Kingdom) Andy Wallace	Porsche RS Spyder Evo	MI	106
4	LMP2	16	(United States) Dyson Racing	(United States) Butch Leitzinger (United Kingdom) Andy Wallace	Porsche MR6 3.4L V8	MI	106
5	LMP2	9	(United States) Highcroft Racing	(Australia) David Brabham (Sweden) Stefan Johansson	Acura ARX-01a	MI	106
5	LMP2	9	(United States) Highcroft Racing	(Australia) David Brabham (Sweden) Stefan Johansson	Acura AL7R 3.4L V8	MI	106
6	LMP2	15	(Mexico) Lowe's Fernández Racing	(Mexico) Adrian Fernández (Mexico) Luis Diaz	Lola B06/43	MI	106
6	LMP2	15	(Mexico) Lowe's Fernández Racing	(Mexico) Adrian Fernández (Mexico) Luis Diaz	Acura AL7R 3.4L V8	MI	106
7	LMP2	20	(United States) Dyson Racing	(United States) Chris Dyson (United Kingdom) Guy Smith	Porsche RS Spyder Evo	MI	106
7	LMP2	20	(United States) Dyson Racing	(United States) Chris Dyson (United Kingdom) Guy Smith	Porsche MR6 3.4L V8	MI	106
8	LMP2	8	(United States) B-K Motorsports (Japan) Mazdaspeed	(United States) Jamie Bach (United Kingdom) Ben Devlin	Lola B07/46	KU	105
8	LMP2	8	(United States) B-K Motorsports (Japan) Mazdaspeed	(United States) Jamie Bach (United Kingdom) Ben Devlin	Mazda MZR-R 2.0L Turbo I4	KU	105
9	LMP2	6	(United States) Penske Racing	(Germany) Sascha Maassen (Australia) Ryan Briscoe	Porsche RS Spyder Evo	MI	104
9	LMP2	6	(United States) Penske Racing	(Germany) Sascha Maassen (Australia) Ryan Briscoe	Porsche MR6 3.4L V8	MI	104
10	**GT1**	**3**	**(United States) Corvette Racing**	**(United States) Johnny O'Connell (Denmark) Jan Magnussen**	**Chevrolet Corvette C6.R**	MI	**103**
10	**GT1**	**3**	**(United States) Corvette Racing**	**(United States) Johnny O'Connell (Denmark) Jan Magnussen**	**Chevrolet LS7-R 7.0L V8**	MI	**103**
11	GT1	4	(United States) Corvette Racing	(United Kingdom) Oliver Gavin (Monaco) Olivier Beretta	Chevrolet Corvette C6.R	MI	102
11	GT1	4	(United States) Corvette Racing	(United Kingdom) Oliver Gavin (Monaco) Olivier Beretta	Chevrolet LS7-R 7.0L V8	MI	102
12	**GT2**	**62**	**(United States) Risi Competizione**	**(Finland) Mika Salo (Brazil) Jaime Melo**	**Ferrari F430GT**	MI	**101**
12	**GT2**	**62**	**(United States) Risi Competizione**	**(Finland) Mika Salo (Brazil) Jaime Melo**	**Ferrari 4.0L V8**	MI	**101**
13	GT2	44	(United States) Flying Lizard Motorsports	(United States) Darren Law (United States) Patrick Long	Porsche 997 GT3-RSR	MI	101
13	GT2	44	(United States) Flying Lizard Motorsports	(United States) Darren Law (United States) Patrick Long	Porsche 3.8L Flat-6	MI	101
14	GT2	31	(United States) Petersen Motorsports (United States) White Lightning Racing	(United Kingdom) Peter Dumbreck (Germany) Dirk Müller	Ferrari F430GT	MI	100
14	GT2	31	(United States) Petersen Motorsports (United States) White Lightning Racing	(United Kingdom) Peter Dumbreck (Germany) Dirk Müller	Ferrari 4.0L V8	MI	100
15	GT2	61	(United States) Risi Competizione	(France) Éric Hélary (Italy) Gianmaria Bruni	Ferrari F430GT	MI	100
15	GT2	61	(United States) Risi Competizione	(France) Éric Hélary (Italy) Gianmaria Bruni	Ferrari 4.0L V8	MI	100
16	LMP1	06	(United States) Team Cytosport	(United States) Greg Pickett (Germany) Klaus Graf	Lola B06/10	D	99
16	LMP1	06	(United States) Team Cytosport	(United States) Greg Pickett (Germany) Klaus Graf	AER P32T 3.6L Turbo V8	D	99
17	GT2	73	(United States) Tafel Racing	(United States) Jim Tafel (Germany) Dominik Farnbacher	Porsche 997 GT3-RSR	MI	98
17	GT2	73	(United States) Tafel Racing	(United States) Jim Tafel (Germany) Dominik Farnbacher	Porsche 3.8L Flat-6	MI	98
18	GT2	54	(United States) Team Trans Sport Racing	(United States) Terry Borcheller (United States) Tim Pappas	Porsche 997 GT3-RSR	Y	98
18	GT2	54	(United States) Team Trans Sport Racing	(United States) Terry Borcheller (United States) Tim Pappas	Porsche 3.8L Flat-6	Y	98
19	LMP2	26	(United States) Andretti Green Racing	(United States) Bryan Herta (United Kingdom) Marino Franchitti	Acura ARX-01a	MI	92
19	LMP2	26	(United States) Andretti Green Racing	(United States) Bryan Herta (United Kingdom) Marino Franchitti	Acura AL7R 3.4L V8	MI	92
20 NC	GT2	22	(United States) Panoz Team PTG	(United States) Bill Auberlen (United States) Joey Hand	Panoz Esperante GT-LM	Y	73
20 NC	GT2	22	(United States) Panoz Team PTG	(United States) Bill Auberlen (United States) Joey Hand	Ford (Élan) 5.0L V8	Y	73
21 NC	GT2	11	(United States) Primetime Race Group	(United States) Joel Feinberg (United States) Chapman Ducote	Dodge Viper Competition Coupe	MI	67
21 NC	GT2	11	(United States) Primetime Race Group	(United States) Joel Feinberg (United States) Chapman Ducote	Dodge 8.3L V10	MI	67
22 DNF	GT2	18	(United States) Rahal Letterman Racing	(United States) Tom Milner Jr. (Germany) Ralf Kelleners	Porsche 997 GT3-RSR	MI	61
22 DNF	GT2	18	(United States) Rahal Letterman Racing	(United States) Tom Milner Jr. (Germany) Ralf Kelleners	Porsche 3.8L Flat-6	MI	61
23 DNF	GT2	45	(United States) Flying Lizard Motorsports	(United States) Johannes van Overbeek (Germany) Jörg Bergmeister	Porsche 997 GT3-RSR	MI	57
23 DNF	GT2	45	(United States) Flying Lizard Motorsports	(United States) Johannes van Overbeek (Germany) Jörg Bergmeister	Porsche 3.8L Flat-6	MI	57
24 DNF	GT2	71	(United States) Tafel Racing	(Germany) Wolf Henzler (United Kingdom) Robin Liddell	Porsche 997 GT3-RSR	MI	53
24 DNF	GT2	71	(United States) Tafel Racing	(Germany) Wolf Henzler (United Kingdom) Robin Liddell	Porsche 3.8L Flat-6	MI	53
25 DNF	LMP1	37	(United States) Intersport Racing	(United States) Jon Field (United States) Clint Field (United States) Richard Berry	Creation CA06/H	D	1
25 DNF	LMP1	37	(United States) Intersport Racing	(United States) Jon Field (United States) Clint Field (United States) Richard Berry	Judd GV5 S2 5.0L V10	D	1
DNS	GT2	53	(United States) Robertson Racing	(United States) David Robertson (United States) Andrea Robertson (United States) David Murry	Panoz Esperante GT-LM	D	-
DNS	GT2	53	(United States) Robertson Racing	(United States) David Robertson (United States) Andrea Robertson (United States) David Murry	Ford (Élan) 5.0L V8	D	-

== Statistics ==
- Pole Position - #6 Penske Racing - 1:13.357
- Fastest Lap - #6 Penske Racing - 1:14.993

American Le Mans Series
Previous race: 2007 Grand Prix of Mosport	2007 season	Next race: 2007 Petit Le Mans
