= 2007 Toyota Grand Prix of Long Beach (American Le Mans Series race) =

Long Beach Street Circuit

The 2007 Toyota Grand Prix of Long Beach was the third round of the 2007 American Le Mans Series season. It took place on April 14, 2007.

== Official results ==
Class winners in bold. Cars failing to complete 70% of winner's distance marked as Not Classified (NC).

Pos	Class	No	Team	Drivers	Chassis	Tyre	Laps
Pos	Class	No	Team	Drivers	Engine	Tyre	Laps
1	**LMP2**	**7**	**(United States) Penske Racing**	**(France) Romain Dumas (Germany) Timo Bernhard**	**Porsche RS Spyder Evo**	MI	**74**
1	**LMP2**	**7**	**(United States) Penske Racing**	**(France) Romain Dumas (Germany) Timo Bernhard**	**Porsche MR6 3.4L V8**	MI	**74**
2	LMP2	6	(United States) Penske Racing	(Germany) Sascha Maassen (Australia) Ryan Briscoe	Porsche RS Spyder Evo	MI	74
2	LMP2	6	(United States) Penske Racing	(Germany) Sascha Maassen (Australia) Ryan Briscoe	Porsche MR6 3.4L V8	MI	74
3	LMP2	16	(United States) Dyson Racing	(United States) Butch Leitzinger (United Kingdom) Andy Wallace	Porsche RS Spyder Evo	MI	74
3	LMP2	16	(United States) Dyson Racing	(United States) Butch Leitzinger (United Kingdom) Andy Wallace	Porsche MR6 3.4L V8	MI	74
4	LMP2	9	(United States) Highcroft Racing	(Australia) David Brabham (Sweden) Stefan Johansson	Acura (Courage) ARX-01a	MI	74
4	LMP2	9	(United States) Highcroft Racing	(Australia) David Brabham (Sweden) Stefan Johansson	Acura AL7R 3.4L V8	MI	74
5	LMP2	20	(United States) Dyson Racing	(United States) Chris Dyson (United Kingdom) Guy Smith	Porsche RS Spyder Evo	MI	74
5	LMP2	20	(United States) Dyson Racing	(United States) Chris Dyson (United Kingdom) Guy Smith	Porsche MR6 3.4L V8	MI	74
6	LMP2	26	(United States) Andretti Green Racing	(United States) Bryan Herta (United Kingdom) Dario Franchitti	Acura (Courage) ARX-01a	MI	74
6	LMP2	26	(United States) Andretti Green Racing	(United States) Bryan Herta (United Kingdom) Dario Franchitti	Acura AL7R 3.4L V8	MI	74
7	**LMP1**	**1**	**(United States) Audi Sport North America**	**(Italy) Rinaldo Capello (United Kingdom) Allan McNish**	**Audi R10 TDI**	MI	**74**
7	**LMP1**	**1**	**(United States) Audi Sport North America**	**(Italy) Rinaldo Capello (United Kingdom) Allan McNish**	**Audi TDI 5.5L Turbo V12 (Diesel)**	MI	**74**
8	LMP2	15	(Mexico) Lowe's Fernández Racing	(Mexico) Adrian Fernández (Mexico) Luis Diaz	Lola B06/43	MI	73
8	LMP2	15	(Mexico) Lowe's Fernández Racing	(Mexico) Adrian Fernández (Mexico) Luis Diaz	Acura AL7R 3.4L V8	MI	73
9	LMP1	2	(United States) Audi Sport North America	(Italy) Emanuele Pirro (Germany) Marco Werner	Audi R10 TDI	MI	73
9	LMP1	2	(United States) Audi Sport North America	(Italy) Emanuele Pirro (Germany) Marco Werner	Audi TDI 5.5L Turbo V12 (Diesel)	MI	73
10	**GT1**	**4**	**(United States) Corvette Racing**	**(United Kingdom) Oliver Gavin (Monaco) Olivier Beretta**	**Chevrolet Corvette C6.R**	MI	**71**
10	**GT1**	**4**	**(United States) Corvette Racing**	**(United Kingdom) Oliver Gavin (Monaco) Olivier Beretta**	**Chevrolet LS7.R 7.0L V8**	MI	**71**
11	GT1	3	(United States) Corvette Racing	(United States) Johnny O'Connell (Denmark) Jan Magnussen	Chevrolet Corvette C6.R	MI	71
11	GT1	3	(United States) Corvette Racing	(United States) Johnny O'Connell (Denmark) Jan Magnussen	Chevrolet LS7.R 7.0L V8	MI	71
12	**GT2**	**62**	**(United States) Risi Competizione**	**(Finland) Mika Salo (Brazil) Jaime Melo**	**Ferrari F430 GT2**	MI	**69**
12	**GT2**	**62**	**(United States) Risi Competizione**	**(Finland) Mika Salo (Brazil) Jaime Melo**	**Ferrari 4.0L V8**	MI	**69**
13	GT2	44	(United States) Flying Lizard Motorsports	(United States) Darren Law (United States) Patrick Long	Porsche 997 GT3-RSR	MI	69
13	GT2	44	(United States) Flying Lizard Motorsports	(United States) Darren Law (United States) Patrick Long	Porsche 3.8L Flat-6	MI	69
14	GT2	61	(United States) Risi Competizione	(Sweden) Niclas Jönsson (United States) Anthony Lazzaro	Ferrari F430 GT2	MI	68
14	GT2	61	(United States) Risi Competizione	(Sweden) Niclas Jönsson (United States) Anthony Lazzaro	Ferrari 4.0L V8	MI	68
15	GT2	71	(United States) Tafel Racing	(Germany) Wolf Henzler (United Kingdom) Robin Liddell	Porsche 997 GT3-RSR	MI	68
15	GT2	71	(United States) Tafel Racing	(Germany) Wolf Henzler (United Kingdom) Robin Liddell	Porsche 3.8L Flat-6	MI	68
16	GT2	21	(United States) Panoz Team PTG	(United States) Bill Auberlen (United States) Joey Hand	Panoz Esperante GT-LM	Y	68
16	GT2	21	(United States) Panoz Team PTG	(United States) Bill Auberlen (United States) Joey Hand	Ford (Élan) 5.0L V8	Y	68
17	GT2	31	(United States) Petersen Motorsports (United States) White Lightning Racing	(Germany) Tim Bergmeister (Germany) Dirk Müller	Ferrari F430 GT2	MI	68
17	GT2	31	(United States) Petersen Motorsports (United States) White Lightning Racing	(Germany) Tim Bergmeister (Germany) Dirk Müller	Ferrari 4.0L V8	MI	68
18	LMP1	37	(United States) Intersport Racing	(United States) Jon Field (United States) Clint Field	Creation CA06/H	KU	68
18	LMP1	37	(United States) Intersport Racing	(United States) Jon Field (United States) Clint Field	Judd GV5 S2 5.0L V10	KU	68
19	GT2	73	(United States) Tafel Racing	(United States) Jim Tafel (Germany) Dominik Farnbacher	Porsche 997 GT3-RSR	MI	68
19	GT2	73	(United States) Tafel Racing	(United States) Jim Tafel (Germany) Dominik Farnbacher	Porsche 3.8L Flat-6	MI	68
20	GT2	54	(United States) Team Trans Sport Racing	(United States) Tim Pappas (United States) Terry Borcheller (Germany) Marc Basseng	Porsche 997 GT3-RSR	Y	67
20	GT2	54	(United States) Team Trans Sport Racing	(United States) Tim Pappas (United States) Terry Borcheller (Germany) Marc Basseng	Porsche 3.8L Flat-6	Y	67
21	LMP1	12	(United States) Autocon Motorsports	(United States) Michael Lewis (United States) Chris McMurry	MG-Lola EX257	D	64
21	LMP1	12	(United States) Autocon Motorsports	(United States) Michael Lewis (United States) Chris McMurry	AER P07 2.0L Turbo I4	D	64
22	LMP2	8	(United States) B-K Motorsports (Japan) Mazdaspeed	(United States) Jamie Bach (United Kingdom) Ben Devlin	Lola B07/46	KU	64
22	LMP2	8	(United States) B-K Motorsports (Japan) Mazdaspeed	(United States) Jamie Bach (United Kingdom) Ben Devlin	Mazda MZR-R 2.0L Turbo I4	KU	64
23	GT2	45	(United States) Flying Lizard Motorsports	(United States) Johannes van Overbeek (Germany) Jörg Bergmeister	Porsche 997 GT3-RSR	MI	62
23	GT2	45	(United States) Flying Lizard Motorsports	(United States) Johannes van Overbeek (Germany) Jörg Bergmeister	Porsche 3.8L Flat-6	MI	62
24 DNF	GT2	22	(United States) Panoz Team PTG	(United States) Bryan Sellers (United States) Ross Smith (Canada) Scott Maxwell	Panoz Esperante GT-LM	Y	33
24 DNF	GT2	22	(United States) Panoz Team PTG	(United States) Bryan Sellers (United States) Ross Smith (Canada) Scott Maxwell	Ford (Élan) 5.0L V8	Y	33
25 DNF	GT2	18	(United States) Rahal Letterman Racing	(United States) Tom Milner Jr. (Germany) Ralf Kelleners	Porsche 997 GT3-RSR	MI	11
25 DNF	GT2	18	(United States) Rahal Letterman Racing	(United States) Tom Milner Jr. (Germany) Ralf Kelleners	Porsche 3.8L Flat-6	MI	11
DNS	LMP1	06	(United States) Team Cytosport	(United States) Greg Pickett (Germany) Klaus Graf	Lola B06/10	D	-
DNS	LMP1	06	(United States) Team Cytosport	(United States) Greg Pickett (Germany) Klaus Graf	AER P32T 3.6L Turbo V8	D	-

== Statistics ==
- Pole Position - #26 Andretti Green Racing - 1:11.838
- Fastest Lap - #26 Andretti Green Racing - 1:13.418

American Le Mans Series
Previous race: 2007 Sports Car Challenge of St. Petersburg	2007 season	Next race: 2007 Lone Star Grand Prix
