= 2008 American Le Mans Series at Long Beach =

Long Beach Street Circuit

The 2008 Tequila Patrón American Le Mans Series at Long Beach was the third round of the 2008 American Le Mans Series season. It took place on the streets of Long Beach, California on April 19, 2008.

== Race results ==
Class winners in bold. Cars failing to complete 70% of winner's distance marked as Not Classified (NC).

Pos	Class	No	Team	Drivers	Chassis	Tire	Laps	Time/Retired
Pos	Class	No	Team	Drivers	Engine	Tire	Laps	Time/Retired
1	**LMP1**	**2**	**(United States) Audi Sport North America**	**(Germany) Marco Werner (Germany) Lucas Luhr**	**Audi R10 TDI**	M	**71**	**1:40:37.791**
1	**LMP1**	**2**	**(United States) Audi Sport North America**	**(Germany) Marco Werner (Germany) Lucas Luhr**	**Audi 5.5 L TDI V12 (turbodiesel)**	M	**71**	**1:40:37.791**
2	LMP1	1	(United States) Audi Sport North America	(Germany) Frank Biela (Italy) Emanuele Pirro	Audi R10 TDI	M	71	+ 1.964
2	LMP1	1	(United States) Audi Sport North America	(Germany) Frank Biela (Italy) Emanuele Pirro	Audi 5.5 L TDI V12 (turbodiesel)	M	71	+ 1.964
3	**LMP2**	**9**	**(United States) Patrón Highcroft Racing**	**(United States) Scott Sharp (Australia) David Brabham**	**Acura ARX-01B**	M	**71**	**+ 3.786**
3	**LMP2**	**9**	**(United States) Patrón Highcroft Racing**	**(United States) Scott Sharp (Australia) David Brabham**	**Acura AL7R 3.4 L V8**	M	**71**	**+ 3.786**
4	LMP2	7	(United States) Penske Racing	(Germany) Timo Bernhard (France) Romain Dumas	Porsche RS Spyder Evo	M	71	+ 4.822
4	LMP2	7	(United States) Penske Racing	(Germany) Timo Bernhard (France) Romain Dumas	Porsche MR6 3.4 L V8	M	71	+ 4.822
5	LMP2	6	(United States) Penske Racing	(United States) Patrick Long (Germany) Sascha Maassen	Porsche RS Spyder Evo	M	71	+ 5.440
5	LMP2	6	(United States) Penske Racing	(United States) Patrick Long (Germany) Sascha Maassen	Porsche MR6 3.4 L V8	M	71	+ 5.440
6	LMP2	26	(United States) Andretti Green Racing	(United States) Bryan Herta (Brazil) Christian Fittipaldi	Acura ARX-01B	M	71	+ 15.252
6	LMP2	26	(United States) Andretti Green Racing	(United States) Bryan Herta (Brazil) Christian Fittipaldi	Acura AL7R 3.4 L V8	M	71	+ 15.252
7	LMP2	20	(United States) Dyson Racing	(United States) Butch Leitzinger (United Kingdom) Marino Franchitti	Porsche RS Spyder Evo	M	71	+ 19.212
7	LMP2	20	(United States) Dyson Racing	(United States) Butch Leitzinger (United Kingdom) Marino Franchitti	Porsche MR6 3.4 L V8	M	71	+ 19.212
8	LMP2	15	(Mexico) Lowe's Fernández Racing	(Mexico) Adrian Fernández (Mexico) Luis Diaz	Acura ARX-01B	M	71	+ 19.780
8	LMP2	15	(Mexico) Lowe's Fernández Racing	(Mexico) Adrian Fernández (Mexico) Luis Diaz	Acura AL7R 3.4 L V8	M	71	+ 19.780
9	LMP2	16	(United States) Dyson Racing	(United States) Chris Dyson (United Kingdom) Guy Smith	Porsche RS Spyder Evo	M	71	+ 20.517
9	LMP2	16	(United States) Dyson Racing	(United States) Chris Dyson (United Kingdom) Guy Smith	Porsche MR6 3.4 L V8	M	71	+ 20.517
10	LMP2	8	(United States) B-K Motorsports	(United States) Gerardo Bonilla (United Kingdom) Ben Devlin	Lola B07/46	Y	70	+ 1 Lap
10	LMP2	8	(United States) B-K Motorsports	(United States) Gerardo Bonilla (United Kingdom) Ben Devlin	Mazda MZR-R 2.0 L Turbo I4 (E85 ethanol)	Y	70	+ 1 Lap
11	**GT1**	**3**	**(United States) Corvette Racing**	**(United States) Johnny O'Connell (Denmark) Jan Magnussen**	**Chevrolet Corvette C6.R**	M	**70**	**+ 1 Lap**
11	**GT1**	**3**	**(United States) Corvette Racing**	**(United States) Johnny O'Connell (Denmark) Jan Magnussen**	**Chevrolet LS7-R 7.0 L V8 (E85 ethanol)**	M	**70**	**+ 1 Lap**
12	GT1	4	(United States) Corvette Racing	(United Kingdom) Oliver Gavin (Monaco) Olivier Beretta	Chevrolet Corvette C6.R	M	70	+ 1 Lap
12	GT1	4	(United States) Corvette Racing	(United Kingdom) Oliver Gavin (Monaco) Olivier Beretta	Chevrolet LS7-R 7.0 L V8 (E85 ethanol)	M	70	+ 1 Lap
13	**GT2**	**71**	**(United States) Tafel Racing**	**(Germany) Dominik Farnbacher (Germany) Dirk Müller**	**Ferrari F430GT**	M	**68**	**+ 3 Laps**
13	**GT2**	**71**	**(United States) Tafel Racing**	**(Germany) Dominik Farnbacher (Germany) Dirk Müller**	**Ferrari 4.0 L V8**	M	**68**	**+ 3 Laps**
14	GT2	45	(United States) Flying Lizard Motorsports	(Germany) Jörg Bergmeister (Germany) Wolf Henzler	Porsche 997 GT3-RSR	M	68	+ 3 Laps
14	GT2	45	(United States) Flying Lizard Motorsports	(Germany) Jörg Bergmeister (Germany) Wolf Henzler	Porsche 3.8 L Flat-6	M	68	+ 3 Laps
15	GT2	46	(United States) Flying Lizard Motorsports	(United States) Johannes van Overbeek (France) Patrick Pilet	Porsche 997 GT3-RSR	M	68	+ 3 Laps
15	GT2	46	(United States) Flying Lizard Motorsports	(United States) Johannes van Overbeek (France) Patrick Pilet	Porsche 3.8 L Flat-6	M	68	+ 3 Laps
16	LMP1	12	(United States) Autocon Motorsports	(United States) Michael Lewis (United States) Chris McMurry	Creation CA07	D	67	+ 4 Laps
16	LMP1	12	(United States) Autocon Motorsports	(United States) Michael Lewis (United States) Chris McMurry	Judd GV5 5.0 L V10	D	67	+ 4 Laps
17	GT2	48	(United States) Corsa Motorsport	(United States) Gunnar Jeannette (United Kingdom) Johnny Mowlem	Ferrari F430GT	D	67	+ 4 Laps
17	GT2	48	(United States) Corsa Motorsport	(United States) Gunnar Jeannette (United Kingdom) Johnny Mowlem	Ferrari 4.0 L V8	D	67	+ 4 Laps
18	GT2	87	(United States) Farnbacher-Loles Motorsports	(Germany) Marc Basseng (Australia) Alex Davison	Porsche 997 GT3-RSR	M	66	+ 5 Laps
18	GT2	87	(United States) Farnbacher-Loles Motorsports	(Germany) Marc Basseng (Australia) Alex Davison	Porsche 3.8 L Flat-6	M	66	+ 5 Laps
19	GT2	61	(United States) Risi Competizione	(Austria) Patrick Friesacher (United States) Harrison Brix	Ferrari F430GT	M	66	+ 5 Laps
19	GT2	61	(United States) Risi Competizione	(Austria) Patrick Friesacher (United States) Harrison Brix	Ferrari 4.0 L V8	M	66	+ 5 Laps
20	GT2	44	(United States) Flying Lizard Motorsports 44	(United States) Darren Law (United States) Lonnie Pechnik	Porsche 997 GT3-RSR	M	65	+ 6 Laps
20	GT2	44	(United States) Flying Lizard Motorsports 44	(United States) Darren Law (United States) Lonnie Pechnik	Porsche 3.8 L Flat-6	M	65	+ 6 Laps
21	GT2	5	(Germany) VICI Racing	(United States) Craig Stanton (United States) Nathan Swatzbaugh	Porsche 997 GT3-RSR	K	65	+ 6 Laps
21	GT2	5	(Germany) VICI Racing	(United States) Craig Stanton (United States) Nathan Swatzbaugh	Porsche 3.8 L Flat-6	K	65	+ 6 Laps
22	GT2	62	(United States) Risi Competizione	(Brazil) Jaime Melo (Finland) Mika Salo	Ferrari F430GT	M	65	+ 6 Laps
22	GT2	62	(United States) Risi Competizione	(Brazil) Jaime Melo (Finland) Mika Salo	Ferrari 4.0 L V8	M	65	+ 6 Laps
23	GT2	28	(United States) LG Motorsports	(United States) Lou Gigliotti (United States) Doug Peterson	Chevrolet Corvette C6	K	64	+ 7 Laps
23	GT2	28	(United States) LG Motorsports	(United States) Lou Gigliotti (United States) Doug Peterson	Chevrolet LS3 6.0 L V8	K	64	+ 7 Laps
24	GT2	007	(United Kingdom) Drayson-Barwell	(United Kingdom) Paul Drayson (United Kingdom) Jonny Cocker	Aston Martin V8 Vantage GT2	D	64	+ 7 Laps
24	GT2	007	(United Kingdom) Drayson-Barwell	(United Kingdom) Paul Drayson (United Kingdom) Jonny Cocker	Aston Martin 4.5 L V8 (E85 ethanol)	D	64	+ 7 Laps
25	GT2	40	(United States) Robertson Racing	(United States) David Robertson (United States) David Murry	Ford GT-R Mk.VII	D	63	+8 Laps
25	GT2	40	(United States) Robertson Racing	(United States) David Robertson (United States) David Murry	Ford 5.0 L V8	D	63	+8 Laps
26	LMP1	37	(United States) Intersport Racing	(United States) Jon Field (United States) Clint Field	Lola B06/10	D	62	+ 9 Laps
26	LMP1	37	(United States) Intersport Racing	(United States) Jon Field (United States) Clint Field	AER P32C 4.0 L Turbo V8 (E85 ethanol)	D	62	+ 9 Laps
27 DNF	GT2	21	(United States) Panoz Team PTG	(United States) Tom Milner (United States) Tom Sutherland	Panoz Esperante GT-LM	Y	51	mechanical
27 DNF	GT2	21	(United States) Panoz Team PTG	(United States) Tom Milner (United States) Tom Sutherland	Ford (Élan) 5.0 L V8	Y	51	mechanical
28 DNF	GT2	11	(United States) Primetime Race Group	(United States) Joel Feinberg (United States) Chris Hall	Dodge Viper Competition Coupe	M	2	excluded
28 DNF	GT2	11	(United States) Primetime Race Group	(United States) Joel Feinberg (United States) Chris Hall	Dodge 8.3 L V10	M	2	excluded

== Statistics ==
- Pole Position - #7 Penske Racing - 1:11.330
- Fastest Lap - #6 Penske Racing - 1:12.383

American Le Mans Series
Previous race: 2008 Sports Car Challenge of St. Petersburg	2008 season	Next race: 2008 Utah Grand Prix
