= 2007 Grand Prix of Mosport =

Mosport International Raceway

The 2007 Grand Prix of Mosport presented by Mobil 1 was the ninth round of the 2007 American Le Mans Series season. It took place at Mosport International Raceway, Canada on August 26, 2007.

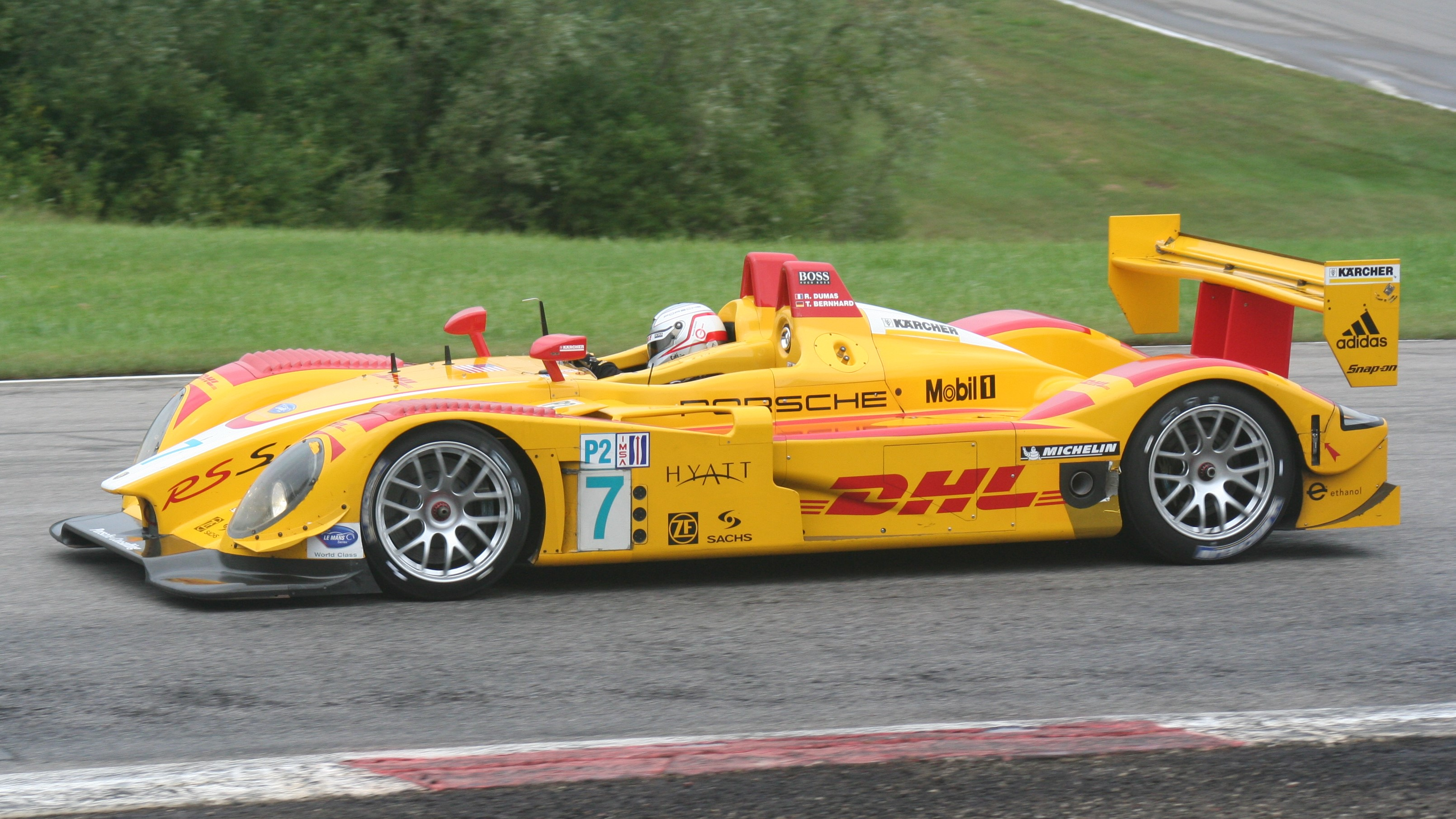
Penske Racing Porsche RS Spyder Evo - Winner 2007 Grand Prix of Mosport

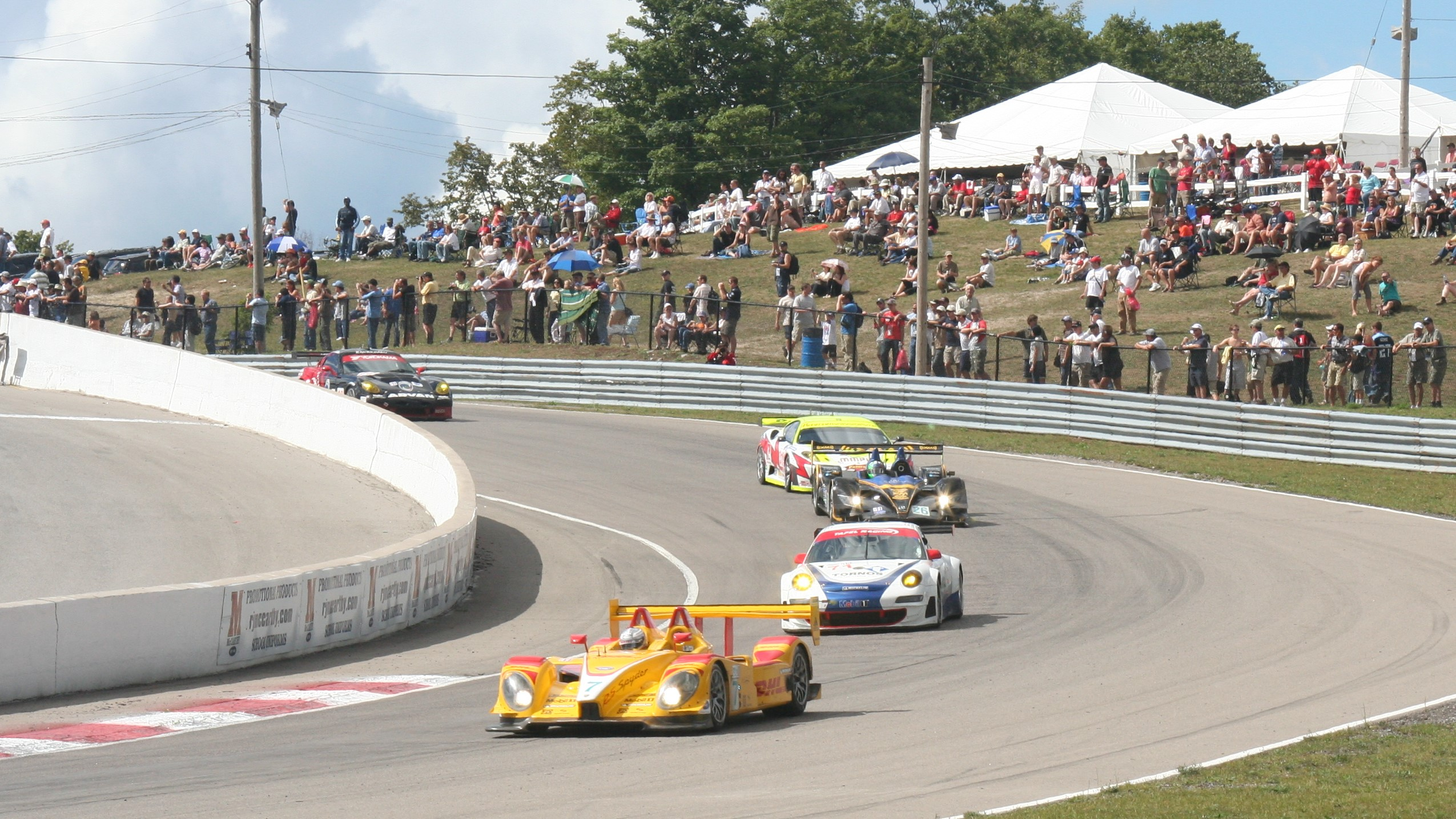
2007 Grand Prix of Mosport turn 1 race action

== Official results ==
Class winners in bold. Cars failing to complete 70% of winner's distance marked as Not Classified (NC).

Pos	Class	No	Team	Drivers	Chassis	Tyre	Laps
Pos	Class	No	Team	Drivers	Engine	Tyre	Laps
1	**LMP2**	**7**	**(United States) Penske Racing**	**(France) Romain Dumas (Germany) Timo Bernhard**	**Porsche RS Spyder Evo**	MI	**125**
1	**LMP2**	**7**	**(United States) Penske Racing**	**(France) Romain Dumas (Germany) Timo Bernhard**	**Porsche MR6 3.4L V8**	MI	**125**
2	**LMP1**	**1**	**(United States) Audi Sport North America**	**(Italy) Rinaldo Capello (United Kingdom) Allan McNish**	**Audi R10 TDI**	MI	**125**
2	**LMP1**	**1**	**(United States) Audi Sport North America**	**(Italy) Rinaldo Capello (United Kingdom) Allan McNish**	**Audi 5.5L TDI V12 (Diesel)**	MI	**125**
3	LMP2	6	(United States) Penske Racing	(Germany) Sascha Maassen (Australia) Ryan Briscoe	Porsche RS Spyder Evo	MI	125
3	LMP2	6	(United States) Penske Racing	(Germany) Sascha Maassen (Australia) Ryan Briscoe	Porsche MR6 3.4L V8	MI	125
4	LMP1	2	(United States) Audi Sport North America	(Italy) Emanuele Pirro (Germany) Marco Werner	Audi R10 TDI	MI	125
4	LMP1	2	(United States) Audi Sport North America	(Italy) Emanuele Pirro (Germany) Marco Werner	Audi 5.5L TDI V12 (Diesel)	MI	125
5	LMP2	26	(United States) Andretti Green Racing	(United States) Bryan Herta (United Kingdom) Marino Franchitti	Acura ARX-01a	MI	125
5	LMP2	26	(United States) Andretti Green Racing	(United States) Bryan Herta (United Kingdom) Marino Franchitti	Acura AL7R 3.4L V8	MI	125
6	LMP2	8	(United States) B-K Motorsports (Japan) Mazdaspeed	(United States) Jamie Bach (United Kingdom) Ben Devlin	Lola B07/46	KU	124
6	LMP2	8	(United States) B-K Motorsports (Japan) Mazdaspeed	(United States) Jamie Bach (United Kingdom) Ben Devlin	Mazda MZR-R 2.0L Turbo I4	KU	124
7	LMP2	20	(United States) Dyson Racing	(United States) Chris Dyson (United Kingdom) Guy Smith	Porsche RS Spyder Evo	MI	124
7	LMP2	20	(United States) Dyson Racing	(United States) Chris Dyson (United Kingdom) Guy Smith	Porsche MR6 3.4L V8	MI	124
8	LMP2	15	(Mexico) Lowe's Fernández Racing	(Mexico) Adrian Fernández (Mexico) Luis Diaz	Lola B06/43	MI	124
8	LMP2	15	(Mexico) Lowe's Fernández Racing	(Mexico) Adrian Fernández (Mexico) Luis Diaz	Acura AL7R 3.4L V8	MI	124
9	LMP2	16	(United States) Dyson Racing	(United States) Butch Leitzinger (United Kingdom) Andy Wallace	Porsche RS Spyder Evo	MI	124
9	LMP2	16	(United States) Dyson Racing	(United States) Butch Leitzinger (United Kingdom) Andy Wallace	Porsche MR6 3.4L V8	MI	124
10	**GT1**	**3**	**(United States) Corvette Racing**	**(United States) Johnny O'Connell (Denmark) Jan Magnussen**	**Chevrolet Corvette C6.R**	MI	**116**
10	**GT1**	**3**	**(United States) Corvette Racing**	**(United States) Johnny O'Connell (Denmark) Jan Magnussen**	**Chevrolet LS7-R 7.0L V8**	MI	**116**
11	GT1	4	(United States) Corvette Racing	(United Kingdom) Oliver Gavin (Monaco) Olivier Beretta	Chevrolet Corvette C6.R	MI	116
11	GT1	4	(United States) Corvette Racing	(United Kingdom) Oliver Gavin (Monaco) Olivier Beretta	Chevrolet LS7-R 7.0L V8	MI	116
12	GT1	33	(United States) Pratt & Miller	(Canada) Ron Fellows (United States) Andy Pilgrim	Chevrolet Corvette C6.R	MI	116
12	GT1	33	(United States) Pratt & Miller	(Canada) Ron Fellows (United States) Andy Pilgrim	Chevrolet LS7-R 7.0L V8	MI	116
13	**GT2**	**62**	**(United States) Risi Competizione**	**(Finland) Mika Salo (Brazil) Jaime Melo**	**Ferrari F430GT**	MI	**112**
13	**GT2**	**62**	**(United States) Risi Competizione**	**(Finland) Mika Salo (Brazil) Jaime Melo**	**Ferrari 4.0L V8**	MI	**112**
14	GT2	61	(United States) Risi Competizione	(France) Éric Hélary (Italy) Gianmaria Bruni	Ferrari F430GT	MI	111
14	GT2	61	(United States) Risi Competizione	(France) Éric Hélary (Italy) Gianmaria Bruni	Ferrari 4.0L V8	MI	111
15	LMP1	12	(United States) Autocon Motorsports	(United States) Chris McMurry (Canada) Tony Burgess	Creation CA06/H	D	111
15	LMP1	12	(United States) Autocon Motorsports	(United States) Chris McMurry (Canada) Tony Burgess	Judd GV5 S2 5.0L V10	D	111
16	GT2	18	(United States) Rahal Letterman Racing	(United States) Tommy Milner (Germany) Ralf Kelleners	Porsche 997 GT3-RSR	MI	111
16	GT2	18	(United States) Rahal Letterman Racing	(United States) Tommy Milner (Germany) Ralf Kelleners	Porsche 3.8L Flat-6	MI	111
17	GT2	31	(United States) Petersen Motorsports (United States) White Lightning Racing	(United Kingdom) Peter Dumbreck (Germany) Dirk Müller	Ferrari F430GT	MI	110
17	GT2	31	(United States) Petersen Motorsports (United States) White Lightning Racing	(United Kingdom) Peter Dumbreck (Germany) Dirk Müller	Ferrari 4.0L V8	MI	110
18	GT2	45	(United States) Flying Lizard Motorsports	(United States) Johannes van Overbeek (Germany) Jörg Bergmeister	Porsche 997 GT3-RSR	MI	110
18	GT2	45	(United States) Flying Lizard Motorsports	(United States) Johannes van Overbeek (Germany) Jörg Bergmeister	Porsche 3.8L Flat-6	MI	110
19	GT2	71	(United States) Tafel Racing	(Germany) Wolf Henzler (United Kingdom) Robin Liddell	Porsche 997 GT3-RSR	MI	109
19	GT2	71	(United States) Tafel Racing	(Germany) Wolf Henzler (United Kingdom) Robin Liddell	Porsche 3.8L Flat-6	MI	109
20	GT2	44	(United States) Flying Lizard Motorsports	(United States) Lonnie Pechnik (United States) Seth Neiman	Porsche 997 GT3-RSR	MI	109
20	GT2	44	(United States) Flying Lizard Motorsports	(United States) Lonnie Pechnik (United States) Seth Neiman	Porsche 3.8L Flat-6	MI	109
21	GT2	73	(United States) Tafel Racing	(United States) Jim Tafel (Germany) Dominik Farnbacher	Porsche 997 GT3-RSR	MI	94
21	GT2	73	(United States) Tafel Racing	(United States) Jim Tafel (Germany) Dominik Farnbacher	Porsche 3.8L Flat-6	MI	94
22 DNF	LMP1	37	(United States) Intersport Racing	(United States) Jon Field (United States) Clint Field (United States) Richard Berry	Creation CA06/H	D	86
22 DNF	LMP1	37	(United States) Intersport Racing	(United States) Jon Field (United States) Clint Field (United States) Richard Berry	Judd GV5 S2 5.0L V10	D	86
23 DNF	GT2	22	(United States) Panoz Team PTG	(United States) Bill Auberlen (United States) Joey Hand	Panoz Esperante GT-LM	Y	54
23 DNF	GT2	22	(United States) Panoz Team PTG	(United States) Bill Auberlen (United States) Joey Hand	Ford (Élan) 5.0L V8	Y	54
24 DNF	LMP2	9	(United States) Highcroft Racing	(Australia) David Brabham (Sweden) Stefan Johansson	Acura ARX-01a	MI	48
24 DNF	LMP2	9	(United States) Highcroft Racing	(Australia) David Brabham (Sweden) Stefan Johansson	Acura AL7R 3.4L V8	MI	48
25 DNF	LMP2	19	(United States) Van der Steur Racing	(United States) Gunnar van der Steur (United States) Adam Pecorari	Radical SR9	KU	6
25 DNF	LMP2	19	(United States) Van der Steur Racing	(United States) Gunnar van der Steur (United States) Adam Pecorari	AER P07 2.0L Turbo I4	KU	6
ALMS FINAL RACE REPORT

== Statistics ==
- Pole Position - #1 Audi Sport North America - 1:05.829
- Fastest Lap - #2 Audi Sport North America - 1:06.371

American Le Mans Series
Previous race: 2007 Road America 500	2007 season	Next race: 2007 Detroit Sports Car Challenge
