= 2007 Sports Car Challenge of St. Petersburg =

American Le Mans Series race

St. Petersburg Street Circuit

The 2007 Acura Sports Car Challenge of St. Petersburg was the second round of the 2007 American Le Mans Series season. It took place on March 31, 2007.

== Official results ==
Class winners in bold. Cars failing to complete 70% of winner's distance marked as Not Classified (NC).

Pos	Class	No	Team	Drivers	Chassis	Tyre	Laps
Pos	Class	No	Team	Drivers	Engine	Tyre	Laps
1	**LMP1**	**1**	**(United States) Audi Sport North America**	**(Italy) Rinaldo Capello (United Kingdom) Allan McNish**	**Audi R10 TDI**	MI	**114**
1	**LMP1**	**1**	**(United States) Audi Sport North America**	**(Italy) Rinaldo Capello (United Kingdom) Allan McNish**	**Audi 5.5L TDI V12 (Diesel)**	MI	**114**
2	LMP1	2	(United States) Audi Sport North America	(Italy) Emanuele Pirro (Germany) Marco Werner	Audi R10 TDI	MI	114
2	LMP1	2	(United States) Audi Sport North America	(Italy) Emanuele Pirro (Germany) Marco Werner	Audi 5.5L TDI V12 (Diesel)	MI	114
3	**LMP2**	**6**	**(United States) Penske Racing**	**(Germany) Sascha Maassen (Australia) Ryan Briscoe**	**Porsche RS Spyder Evo**	MI	**114**
3	**LMP2**	**6**	**(United States) Penske Racing**	**(Germany) Sascha Maassen (Australia) Ryan Briscoe**	**Porsche MR6 3.4L V8**	MI	**114**
4	LMP2	7	(United States) Penske Racing	(France) Romain Dumas (Germany) Timo Bernhard	Porsche RS Spyder Evo	MI	114
4	LMP2	7	(United States) Penske Racing	(France) Romain Dumas (Germany) Timo Bernhard	Porsche MR6 3.4L V8	MI	114
5	LMP2	9	(United States) Highcroft Racing	(Australia) David Brabham (Sweden) Stefan Johansson	Acura (Courage) ARX-01a	MI	114
5	LMP2	9	(United States) Highcroft Racing	(Australia) David Brabham (Sweden) Stefan Johansson	Acura AL7R 3.4L V8	MI	114
6	LMP2	15	(Mexico) Lowe's Fernández Racing	(Mexico) Adrian Fernández (Mexico) Luis Diaz	Lola B06/43	MI	113
6	LMP2	15	(Mexico) Lowe's Fernández Racing	(Mexico) Adrian Fernández (Mexico) Luis Diaz	Acura AL7R 3.4L V8	MI	113
7	LMP1	37	(United States) Intersport Racing	(United States) Jon Field (United States) Clint Field (United States) Richard Berry	Creation CA06/H	KU	112
7	LMP1	37	(United States) Intersport Racing	(United States) Jon Field (United States) Clint Field (United States) Richard Berry	Judd GV5 S2 5.0L V10	KU	112
8	**GT1**	**4**	**(United States) Corvette Racing**	**(United Kingdom) Oliver Gavin (Monaco) Olivier Beretta**	**Chevrolet Corvette C6.R**	MI	**111**
8	**GT1**	**4**	**(United States) Corvette Racing**	**(United Kingdom) Oliver Gavin (Monaco) Olivier Beretta**	**Chevrolet LS7-R 7.0L V8**	MI	**111**
9	**GT2**	**62**	**(United States) Risi Competizione**	**(Finland) Mika Salo (Brazil) Jaime Melo**	**Ferrari F430GT**	MI	**109**
9	**GT2**	**62**	**(United States) Risi Competizione**	**(Finland) Mika Salo (Brazil) Jaime Melo**	**Ferrari 4.0L V8**	MI	**109**
10	GT2	45	(United States) Flying Lizard Motorsports	(United States) Johannes van Overbeek (Germany) Jörg Bergmeister	Porsche 997 GT3-RSR	MI	108
10	GT2	45	(United States) Flying Lizard Motorsports	(United States) Johannes van Overbeek (Germany) Jörg Bergmeister	Porsche 3.8L Flat-6	MI	108
11	LMP2	16	(United States) Dyson Racing	(United States) Butch Leitzinger (United Kingdom) Andy Wallace	Porsche RS Spyder Evo	MI	108
11	LMP2	16	(United States) Dyson Racing	(United States) Butch Leitzinger (United Kingdom) Andy Wallace	Porsche MR6 3.4L V8	MI	108
12	GT2	21	(United States) Panoz Team PTG	(United States) Bill Auberlen (United States) Joey Hand	Panoz Esperante GT-LM	Y	107
12	GT2	21	(United States) Panoz Team PTG	(United States) Bill Auberlen (United States) Joey Hand	Ford (Élan) 5.0L V8	Y	107
13	GT2	44	(United States) Flying Lizard Motorsports	(United States) Darren Law (United States) Lonnie Pechnik	Porsche 997 GT3-RSR	MI	107
13	GT2	44	(United States) Flying Lizard Motorsports	(United States) Darren Law (United States) Lonnie Pechnik	Porsche 3.8L Flat-6	MI	107
14	GT2	71	(United States) Tafel Racing	(Germany) Wolf Henzler (United Kingdom) Robin Liddell	Porsche 997 GT3-RSR	MI	106
14	GT2	71	(United States) Tafel Racing	(Germany) Wolf Henzler (United Kingdom) Robin Liddell	Porsche 3.8L Flat-6	MI	106
15	GT2	73	(United States) Tafel Racing	(United States) Jim Tafel (Germany) Dominik Farnbacher	Porsche 997 GT3-RSR	MI	106
15	GT2	73	(United States) Tafel Racing	(United States) Jim Tafel (Germany) Dominik Farnbacher	Porsche 3.8L Flat-6	MI	106
16	GT2	54	(United States) Team Trans Sport Racing	(United States) Tim Pappas (United States) Terry Borcheller	Porsche 997 GT3-RSR	Y	104
16	GT2	54	(United States) Team Trans Sport Racing	(United States) Tim Pappas (United States) Terry Borcheller	Porsche 3.8L Flat-6	Y	104
17 DNF	GT2	18	(United States) Rahal Letterman Racing	(United States) Tom Milner Jr. (Germany) Ralf Kelleners	Porsche 997 GT3-RSR	MI	100
17 DNF	GT2	18	(United States) Rahal Letterman Racing	(United States) Tom Milner Jr. (Germany) Ralf Kelleners	Porsche 3.8L Flat-6	MI	100
18 DNF	LMP2	20	(United States) Dyson Racing	(United States) Chris Dyson (United Kingdom) Guy Smith	Porsche RS Spyder Evo	MI	98
18 DNF	LMP2	20	(United States) Dyson Racing	(United States) Chris Dyson (United Kingdom) Guy Smith	Porsche MR6 3.4L V8	MI	98
19	GT2	22	(United States) Panoz Team PTG	(United States) Bryan Sellers (United States) Ross Smith (Canada) Scott Maxwell	Panoz Esperante GT-LM	Y	97
19	GT2	22	(United States) Panoz Team PTG	(United States) Bryan Sellers (United States) Ross Smith (Canada) Scott Maxwell	Ford (Élan) 5.0L V8	Y	97
20 DNF	GT2	31	(United States) Petersen Motorsports (United States) White Lightning Racing	(Germany) Tim Bergmeister (Czech Republic) Tomáš Enge	Ferrari F430GT	MI	87
20 DNF	GT2	31	(United States) Petersen Motorsports (United States) White Lightning Racing	(Germany) Tim Bergmeister (Czech Republic) Tomáš Enge	Ferrari 4.0L V8	MI	87
21	LMP2	26	(United States) Andretti Green Racing	(United States) Bryan Herta (United Kingdom) Marino Franchitti	Acura (Courage) ARX-01a	MI	84
21	LMP2	26	(United States) Andretti Green Racing	(United States) Bryan Herta (United Kingdom) Marino Franchitti	Acura AL7R 3.4L V8	MI	84
22 DNF	LMP1	12	(United States) Autocon Motorsports	(United States) Michael Lewis (United States) Chris McMurray (United States) Bryan Willman	MG-Lola EX257	D	38
22 DNF	LMP1	12	(United States) Autocon Motorsports	(United States) Michael Lewis (United States) Chris McMurray (United States) Bryan Willman	AER P07 2.0L Turbo I4	D	38
23 DNF	GT1	3	(United States) Corvette Racing	(United States) Johnny O'Connell (Denmark) Jan Magnussen	Chevrolet Corvette C6.R	MI	37
23 DNF	GT1	3	(United States) Corvette Racing	(United States) Johnny O'Connell (Denmark) Jan Magnussen	Chevrolet LS7-R 7.0L V8	MI	37
24 DNF	LMP2	8	(United States) B-K Motorsports (Japan) Mazdaspeed	(United States) Jamie Bach (United Kingdom) Ben Devlin	Lola B07/46	KU	26
24 DNF	LMP2	8	(United States) B-K Motorsports (Japan) Mazdaspeed	(United States) Jamie Bach (United Kingdom) Ben Devlin	Mazda MZR-R 2.0L Turbo I4	KU	26
DNS	GT2	61	(United States) Risi Competizione	(Sweden) Niclas Jönsson (Argentina) José María López	Ferrari F430GT	MI	-
DNS	GT2	61	(United States) Risi Competizione	(Sweden) Niclas Jönsson (Argentina) José María López	Ferrari 4.0L V8	MI	-

== Statistics ==
- Pole Position - #7 Penske Racing - 1:03.089
- Fastest Lap - #6 Penske Racing - 1:04.340

American Le Mans Series
Previous race: 2007 12 Hours of Sebring	2007 season	Next race: 2007 ALMS Grand Prix of Long Beach
