= 2008 Detroit Sports Car Challenge =

Car race

The Raceway on Belle Isle in 2008

The Detroit Sports Car Challenge presented by Bosch was the ninth round of the 2008 American Le Mans Series season. It took place at the Detroit Belle Isle street circuit, Michigan on August 30, 2008.

== Report ==
Andretti Green Racing scored their first overall victory, as well as the second overall victory for the Acura program. Audi failed to win the LMP1 category for the first time all season after one car crashed and the other was disqualified for a rule infraction. Intersport Racing, the lone remaining LMP1 competitor, earned the class win. Flying Lizard managed to finish the race with all three of their Porsches in the top four in GT2 to help extend their lead over the Tafel Racing Ferraris, while Corvette Racing easily led the GT1 category.

This race marked the first time since the debut of the Porsche RS Spyder at the 2005 Monterey Sports Car Championships that Porsche failed to finish in a podium position in the LMP2 class; the Acuras of Highcroft Racing and de Ferran Motorsport completed the LMP2 and overall podium behind the Andretti Green Acura, and ahead of the #7 Penske Racing Porsche in fourth.

== Race results ==
Class winners in bold. Cars failing to complete 70% of winner's distance marked as Not Classified (NC).

Pos	Class	No	Team	Drivers	Chassis	Tyre	Laps
Pos	Class	No	Team	Drivers	Engine	Tyre	Laps
1	**LMP2**	**26**	**(United States) Andretti Green Racing**	**(France) Franck Montagny (United Kingdom) James Rossiter**	**Acura ARX-01B**	MI	**104**
1	**LMP2**	**26**	**(United States) Andretti Green Racing**	**(France) Franck Montagny (United Kingdom) James Rossiter**	**Acura AL7R 3.4 L V8**	MI	**104**
2	LMP2	9	(United States) Patrón Highcroft Racing	(United States) Scott Sharp (Australia) David Brabham	Acura ARX-01B	MI	104
2	LMP2	9	(United States) Patrón Highcroft Racing	(United States) Scott Sharp (Australia) David Brabham	Acura AL7R 3.4 L V8	MI	104
3	LMP2	66	(United States) de Ferran Motorsports	(Brazil) Gil de Ferran (France) Simon Pagenaud	Acura ARX-01B	MI	104
3	LMP2	66	(United States) de Ferran Motorsports	(Brazil) Gil de Ferran (France) Simon Pagenaud	Acura AL7R 3.4 L V8	MI	104
4	LMP2	7	(United States) Penske Racing	(Germany) Timo Bernhard (France) Romain Dumas	Porsche RS Spyder Evo	MI	104
4	LMP2	7	(United States) Penske Racing	(Germany) Timo Bernhard (France) Romain Dumas	Porsche MR6 3.4 L V8	MI	104
5	LMP2	6	(United States) Penske Racing	(United States) Patrick Long (Australia) Ryan Briscoe	Porsche RS Spyder Evo	MI	104
5	LMP2	6	(United States) Penske Racing	(United States) Patrick Long (Australia) Ryan Briscoe	Porsche MR6 3.4 L V8	MI	104
6	LMP2	16	(United States) Dyson Racing	(United States) Chris Dyson (United Kingdom) Guy Smith	Porsche RS Spyder Evo	MI	103
6	LMP2	16	(United States) Dyson Racing	(United States) Chris Dyson (United Kingdom) Guy Smith	Porsche MR6 3.4 L V8	MI	103
7	LMP2	8	(United States) B-K Motorsports	(United States) Gerardo Bonilla (United Kingdom) Ben Devlin	Lola B07/46	D	103
7	LMP2	8	(United States) B-K Motorsports	(United States) Gerardo Bonilla (United Kingdom) Ben Devlin	Mazda MZR-R 2.0 L Turbo I4 (E85 ethanol)	D	103
8	LMP2	20	(United States) Dyson Racing	(United States) Butch Leitzinger (United Kingdom) Marino Franchitti	Porsche RS Spyder Evo	MI	102
8	LMP2	20	(United States) Dyson Racing	(United States) Butch Leitzinger (United Kingdom) Marino Franchitti	Porsche MR6 3.4 L V8	MI	102
9	**GT1**	**4**	**(United States) Corvette Racing**	**(United Kingdom) Oliver Gavin (Monaco) Olivier Beretta**	**Chevrolet Corvette C6.R**	MI	**100**
9	**GT1**	**4**	**(United States) Corvette Racing**	**(United Kingdom) Oliver Gavin (Monaco) Olivier Beretta**	**Chevrolet LS7-R 7.0 L V8 (E85 ethanol)**	MI	**100**
10	GT1	3	(United States) Corvette Racing	(United States) Johnny O'Connell (Denmark) Jan Magnussen	Chevrolet Corvette C6.R	MI	100
10	GT1	3	(United States) Corvette Racing	(United States) Johnny O'Connell (Denmark) Jan Magnussen	Chevrolet LS7-R 7.0 L V8 (E85 ethanol)	MI	100
11	**GT2**	**45**	**(United States) Flying Lizard Motorsports**	**(Germany) Jörg Bergmeister (Germany) Wolf Henzler**	**Porsche 997 GT3-RSR**	MI	**98**
11	**GT2**	**45**	**(United States) Flying Lizard Motorsports**	**(Germany) Jörg Bergmeister (Germany) Wolf Henzler**	**Porsche 4.0 L Flat-6**	MI	**98**
12	GT2	46	(United States) Flying Lizard Motorsports	(United States) Johannes van Overbeek (France) Patrick Pilet	Porsche 997 GT3-RSR	MI	98
12	GT2	46	(United States) Flying Lizard Motorsports	(United States) Johannes van Overbeek (France) Patrick Pilet	Porsche 4.0 L Flat-6	MI	98
13	GT2	62	(United States) Risi Competizione	(Brazil) Jaime Melo (Finland) Mika Salo	Ferrari F430GT	MI	98
13	GT2	62	(United States) Risi Competizione	(Brazil) Jaime Melo (Finland) Mika Salo	Ferrari 4.0 L V8	MI	98
14	GT2	44	(United States) Flying Lizard Motorsports 44	(United States) Lonnie Pechnik (Austria) Martin Ragginger	Porsche 997 GT3-RSR	MI	98
14	GT2	44	(United States) Flying Lizard Motorsports 44	(United States) Lonnie Pechnik (Austria) Martin Ragginger	Porsche 4.0 L Flat-6	MI	98
15	GT2	61	(United States) Risi Competizione	(United States) Harrison Brix (United Kingdom) Rob Bell	Ferrari F430GT	MI	98
15	GT2	61	(United States) Risi Competizione	(United States) Harrison Brix (United Kingdom) Rob Bell	Ferrari 4.0 L V8	MI	98
16	GT2	73	(United States) Tafel Racing	(United States) Jim Tafel (United States) Alex Figge	Ferrari F430GT	MI	95
16	GT2	73	(United States) Tafel Racing	(United States) Jim Tafel (United States) Alex Figge	Ferrari 4.0 L V8	MI	95
17	GT2	11	(United States) Primetime Race Group	(United States) Joel Feinberg (United Kingdom) Chris Hall	Dodge Viper Competition Coupe	HK	94
17	GT2	11	(United States) Primetime Race Group	(United States) Joel Feinberg (United Kingdom) Chris Hall	Dodge 8.3 L V10	HK	94
18	GT1	008	(United States) Bell Motorsports	(United States) Terry Borcheller (United States) Chapman Ducote	Aston Martin DBR9	D	93
18	GT1	008	(United States) Bell Motorsports	(United States) Terry Borcheller (United States) Chapman Ducote	Aston Martin 6.0 L V12	D	93
19	GT2	40	(United States) Robertson Racing	(United States) David Robertson (United States) Andrea Robertson (United States) David Murry	Ford GT-R Mk.VII	D	89
19	GT2	40	(United States) Robertson Racing	(United States) David Robertson (United States) Andrea Robertson (United States) David Murry	Ford 5.0 L V8	D	89
20	GT2	71	(United States) Tafel Racing	(Germany) Dominik Farnbacher (Germany) Dirk Müller	Ferrari F430GT	MI	88
20	GT2	71	(United States) Tafel Racing	(Germany) Dominik Farnbacher (Germany) Dirk Müller	Ferrari 4.0 L V8	MI	88
21 DNF	GT2	21	(United States) Panoz Team PTG	(United States) Tom Milner, Jr. (United States) Tom Sutherland	Panoz Esperante GT-LM	D	87
21 DNF	GT2	21	(United States) Panoz Team PTG	(United States) Tom Milner, Jr. (United States) Tom Sutherland	Ford (Élan) 5.0 L V8	D	87
22	**LMP1**	**37**	**(United States) Intersport Racing**	**(United States) Jon Field (United States) Clint Field (United States) Richard Berry**	**Lola B06/10**	D	**83**
22	**LMP1**	**37**	**(United States) Intersport Racing**	**(United States) Jon Field (United States) Clint Field (United States) Richard Berry**	**AER P32C 4.0 L Turbo V8 (E85 ethanol)**	D	**83**
23	LMP2	15	(Mexico) Lowe's Fernández Racing	(Mexico) Adrian Fernández (Mexico) Luis Díaz	Acura ARX-01B	MI	83
23	LMP2	15	(Mexico) Lowe's Fernández Racing	(Mexico) Adrian Fernández (Mexico) Luis Díaz	Acura AL7R 3.4 L V8	MI	83
24 DNF	GT2	54	(United States) Black Swan Racing	(United States) Tim Pappas (United States) Anthony Lazzaro	Ford GT-R Mk.VII	FAL	49
24 DNF	GT2	54	(United States) Black Swan Racing	(United States) Tim Pappas (United States) Anthony Lazzaro	Ford 5.0 L V8	FAL	49
25 DNF	GT2	18	(Germany) VICI Racing	(Netherlands) Nicky Pastorelli (Netherlands) Francesco Pastorelli (Germany) Marc Basseng	Porsche 997 GT3-RSR	KU	38
25 DNF	GT2	18	(Germany) VICI Racing	(Netherlands) Nicky Pastorelli (Netherlands) Francesco Pastorelli (Germany) Marc Basseng	Porsche 4.0 L Flat-6	KU	38
26 DNF	LMP1	2	(United States) Audi Sport North America	(Germany) Marco Werner (Germany) Lucas Luhr	Audi R10 TDI	MI	21
26 DNF	LMP1	2	(United States) Audi Sport North America	(Germany) Marco Werner (Germany) Lucas Luhr	Audi TDI 5.5 L Turbo V12 (Diesel)	MI	21
27 DNF	GT2	007	(United Kingdom) Drayson-Barwell	(United Kingdom) Paul Drayson (United Kingdom) Jonny Cocker	Aston Martin V8 Vantage GT2	D	1
27 DNF	GT2	007	(United Kingdom) Drayson-Barwell	(United Kingdom) Paul Drayson (United Kingdom) Jonny Cocker	Aston Martin 4.5 L V8 (E85 ethanol)	D	1
DSQ^{†}	LMP1	1	(United States) Audi Sport North America	(Italy) Emanuele Pirro (Switzerland) Marcel Fässler	Audi R10 TDI	MI	104
DSQ^{†}	LMP1	1	(United States) Audi Sport North America	(Italy) Emanuele Pirro (Switzerland) Marcel Fässler	Audi TDI 5.5 L Turbo V12 (Diesel)	MI	104

† - The #1 Audi Sport North America entry was disqualified after the car failed post-race technical inspection. The car was under the minimum weight requirement for its class.

== Statistics ==
- Pole Position - #9 Patrón Highcroft Racing - 1:13.483
- Fastest Lap - #9 Patrón Highcroft Racing - 1:15.540

American Le Mans Series
Previous race: 2008 Grand Prix of Mosport	2008 season	Next race: 2008 Petit Le Mans
