= 2007 Northeast Grand Prix =

Track map of Lime Rock Park

The 2007 Northeast Grand Prix was the sixth round of the 2007 American Le Mans Series season. It took place at Lime Rock Park on July 7, 2007.

== Official results ==
Class winners in bold. Cars failing to complete 70% of winner's distance marked as Not Classified (NC).

Pos	Class	No	Team	Drivers	Chassis	Tyre	Laps
Pos	Class	No	Team	Drivers	Engine	Tyre	Laps
1	**LMP2**	**6**	**(United States) Penske Racing**	**(Germany) Sascha Maassen (Australia) Ryan Briscoe**	**Porsche RS Spyder Evo**	M	**174**
1	**LMP2**	**6**	**(United States) Penske Racing**	**(Germany) Sascha Maassen (Australia) Ryan Briscoe**	**Porsche MR6 3.4L V8**	M	**174**
2	LMP2	7	(United States) Penske Racing	(France) Romain Dumas (Germany) Timo Bernhard	Porsche RS Spyder Evo	M	174
2	LMP2	7	(United States) Penske Racing	(France) Romain Dumas (Germany) Timo Bernhard	Porsche MR6 3.4L V8	M	174
3	LMP2	9	(United States) Highcroft Racing	(Australia) David Brabham (Sweden) Stefan Johansson (United States) Duncan Dayton	Acura ARX-01a	M	174
3	LMP2	9	(United States) Highcroft Racing	(Australia) David Brabham (Sweden) Stefan Johansson (United States) Duncan Dayton	Acura AL7R 3.4L V8	M	174
4	LMP2	20	(United States) Dyson Racing	(United States) Chris Dyson (United Kingdom) Guy Smith	Porsche RS Spyder Evo	M	173
4	LMP2	20	(United States) Dyson Racing	(United States) Chris Dyson (United Kingdom) Guy Smith	Porsche MR6 3.4L V8	M	173
5	**LMP1**	**1**	**(United States) Audi Sport North America**	**(Italy) Rinaldo Capello (United Kingdom) Allan McNish**	**Audi R10 TDI**	M	**173**
5	**LMP1**	**1**	**(United States) Audi Sport North America**	**(Italy) Rinaldo Capello (United Kingdom) Allan McNish**	**Audi 5.5L TDI V12 (Diesel)**	M	**173**
6	LMP2	16	(United States) Dyson Racing	(United States) Butch Leitzinger (United Kingdom) Andy Wallace	Porsche RS Spyder Evo	M	172
6	LMP2	16	(United States) Dyson Racing	(United States) Butch Leitzinger (United Kingdom) Andy Wallace	Porsche MR6 3.4L V8	M	172
7	LMP2	26	(United States) Andretti Green Racing	(United States) Bryan Herta (United Kingdom) Marino Franchitti	Acura ARX-01a	M	170
7	LMP2	26	(United States) Andretti Green Racing	(United States) Bryan Herta (United Kingdom) Marino Franchitti	Acura AL7R 3.4L V8	M	170
8	**GT1**	**4**	**(United States) Corvette Racing**	**(United Kingdom) Oliver Gavin (Monaco) Olivier Beretta**	**Chevrolet Corvette C6.R**	M	**165**
8	**GT1**	**4**	**(United States) Corvette Racing**	**(United Kingdom) Oliver Gavin (Monaco) Olivier Beretta**	**Chevrolet LS7-R 7.0L V8**	M	**165**
9	GT1	3	(United States) Corvette Racing	(United States) Johnny O'Connell (Denmark) Jan Magnussen	Chevrolet Corvette C6.R	M	165
9	GT1	3	(United States) Corvette Racing	(United States) Johnny O'Connell (Denmark) Jan Magnussen	Chevrolet LS7-R 7.0L V8	M	165
10	LMP2	19	(United States) Van der Steur Racing	(United States) Gunnar van der Steur (United States) Adam Pecorari	Radical SR9	K	162
10	LMP2	19	(United States) Van der Steur Racing	(United States) Gunnar van der Steur (United States) Adam Pecorari	AER P07 2.0L Turbo I4	K	162
11	LMP1	37	(United States) Intersport Racing	(United States) Jon Field (United States) Clint Field (United States) Richard Berry	Creation CA06/H	K	160
11	LMP1	37	(United States) Intersport Racing	(United States) Jon Field (United States) Clint Field (United States) Richard Berry	Judd GV5 S2 5.0L V10	K	160
12	**GT2**	**45**	**(United States) Flying Lizard Motorsports**	**(United States) Johannes van Overbeek (Germany) Jörg Bergmeister**	**Porsche 997 GT3-RSR**	M	**157**
12	**GT2**	**45**	**(United States) Flying Lizard Motorsports**	**(United States) Johannes van Overbeek (Germany) Jörg Bergmeister**	**Porsche 3.8L Flat-6**	M	**157**
13	GT2	18	(United States) Rahal Letterman Racing	(United States) Tommy Milner (Germany) Ralf Kelleners	Porsche 997 GT3-RSR	M	156
13	GT2	18	(United States) Rahal Letterman Racing	(United States) Tommy Milner (Germany) Ralf Kelleners	Porsche 3.8L Flat-6	M	156
14	LMP1	12	(United States) Autocon Motorsports	(United States) Michael Lewis (United States) Brian Willman	Creation CA06/H	D	155
14	LMP1	12	(United States) Autocon Motorsports	(United States) Michael Lewis (United States) Brian Willman	Judd GV5 S2 5.0L V10	D	155
15	GT2	61	(United States) Risi Competizione	(Sweden) Niclas Jönsson (France) Éric Hélary	Ferrari F430GT	M	155
15	GT2	61	(United States) Risi Competizione	(Sweden) Niclas Jönsson (France) Éric Hélary	Ferrari 4.0L V8	M	155
16	GT2	44	(United States) Flying Lizard Motorsports	(United States) Darren Law (United States) Seth Neiman	Porsche 997 GT3-RSR	M	154
16	GT2	44	(United States) Flying Lizard Motorsports	(United States) Darren Law (United States) Seth Neiman	Porsche 3.8L Flat-6	M	154
17	GT2	54	(United States) Team Trans Sport Racing	(United States) Tim Pappas (United States) Terry Borcheller	Porsche 997 GT3-RSR	Y	154
17	GT2	54	(United States) Team Trans Sport Racing	(United States) Tim Pappas (United States) Terry Borcheller	Porsche 3.8L Flat-6	Y	154
18	LMP2	8	(United States) B-K Motorsports (Japan) Mazdaspeed	(United States) Jamie Bach (United Kingdom) Ben Devlin	Lola B07/46	K	151
18	LMP2	8	(United States) B-K Motorsports (Japan) Mazdaspeed	(United States) Jamie Bach (United Kingdom) Ben Devlin	Mazda MZR-R 2.0L Turbo I4	K	151
19	GT2	73	(United States) Tafel Racing	(United States) Jim Tafel (Germany) Dominik Farnbacher	Porsche 997 GT3-RSR	M	144
19	GT2	73	(United States) Tafel Racing	(United States) Jim Tafel (Germany) Dominik Farnbacher	Porsche 3.8L Flat-6	M	144
20	GT2	31	(United States) Petersen Motorsports (United States) White Lightning Racing	(Czech Republic) Tomáš Enge (United Kingdom) Darren Turner	Ferrari F430GT	M	138
20	GT2	31	(United States) Petersen Motorsports (United States) White Lightning Racing	(Czech Republic) Tomáš Enge (United Kingdom) Darren Turner	Ferrari 4.0L V8	M	138
21	GT2	21	(United States) Panoz Team PTG	(United States) Bill Auberlen (United States) Joey Hand	Panoz Esperante GT-LM	Y	137
21	GT2	21	(United States) Panoz Team PTG	(United States) Bill Auberlen (United States) Joey Hand	Ford (Élan) 5.0L V8	Y	137
22	GT2	62	(United States) Risi Competizione	(Finland) Mika Salo (Brazil) Jaime Melo	Ferrari F430GT	M	133
22	GT2	62	(United States) Risi Competizione	(Finland) Mika Salo (Brazil) Jaime Melo	Ferrari 4.0L V8	M	133
23	LMP1	2	(United States) Audi Sport North America	(Italy) Emanuele Pirro (Germany) Marco Werner	Audi R10 TDI	M	123
23	LMP1	2	(United States) Audi Sport North America	(Italy) Emanuele Pirro (Germany) Marco Werner	Audi 5.5L TDI V12 (Diesel)	M	123
24 NC	GT2	71	(United States) Tafel Racing	(Germany) Wolf Henzler (United Kingdom) Robin Liddell	Porsche 997 GT3-RSR	M	95
24 NC	GT2	71	(United States) Tafel Racing	(Germany) Wolf Henzler (United Kingdom) Robin Liddell	Porsche 3.8L Flat-6	M	95
25 DNF	LMP2	15	(Mexico) Lowe's Fernández Racing	(Mexico) Adrian Fernández (Mexico) Luis Diaz	Lola B06/43	M	51
25 DNF	LMP2	15	(Mexico) Lowe's Fernández Racing	(Mexico) Adrian Fernández (Mexico) Luis Diaz	Acura AL7R 3.4L V8	M	51
DNS	GT2	22	(United States) Panoz Team PTG	(Canada) Scott Maxwell	Panoz Esperante GT-LM	Y	-
DNS	GT2	22	(United States) Panoz Team PTG	(Canada) Scott Maxwell	Ford (Élan) 5.0L V8	Y	-

== Statistics ==
- Pole Position - #7 Penske Racing - 0:44.659 (Qualifying rained out, grid set by practice times)
- Fastest Lap - #6 Penske Racing - 0:45.371

American Le Mans Series
Previous race: 2007 Utah Grand Prix	2007 season	Next race: 2007 Sports Car Challenge of Mid-Ohio
