= 2008 Northeast Grand Prix =

Track map of Lime Rock Park

The 2008 American Le Mans Northeast Grand Prix was the fifth round of the 2008 American Le Mans Series season. It took place at Lime Rock Park, Connecticut on July 12, 2008. It was the first event to take place at Lime Rock since portions of the track were redesigned and the entire surface repaved.

== Race summary ==
Acura scored their first overall win in the American Le Mans Series since they debuted their ARX-01 program in 2007. The #9 Highcroft Racing Acura of Scott Sharp and David Brabham managed to accomplish the feat with Brabham making a late charge and taking the overall lead in the final 90 seconds of the race, passing the #7 Penske Racing Porsche RS Spyder of Timo Bernhard and Romain Dumas.

=== Race results ===
Class winners in bold. Cars failing to complete 70% of winner's distance marked as Not Classified (NC).

Pos	Class	No	Team	Drivers	Chassis	Tire	Laps
Pos	Class	No	Team	Drivers	Engine	Tire	Laps
1	**LMP2**	**9**	**(United States) Patrón Highcroft Racing**	**(United States) Scott Sharp (Australia) David Brabham**	**Acura ARX-01B**	M	**168**
1	**LMP2**	**9**	**(United States) Patrón Highcroft Racing**	**(United States) Scott Sharp (Australia) David Brabham**	**Acura AL7R 3.4 L V8**	M	**168**
2	LMP2	7	(United States) Penske Racing	(Germany) Timo Bernhard (France) Romain Dumas	Porsche RS Spyder Evo	M	168
2	LMP2	7	(United States) Penske Racing	(Germany) Timo Bernhard (France) Romain Dumas	Porsche MR6 3.4 L V8	M	168
3	LMP2	6	(United States) Penske Racing	(United States) Patrick Long (Germany) Sascha Maassen	Porsche RS Spyder Evo	M	168
3	LMP2	6	(United States) Penske Racing	(United States) Patrick Long (Germany) Sascha Maassen	Porsche MR6 3.4 L V8	M	168
4	**LMP1**	**2**	**(United States) Audi Sport North America**	**(Germany) Marco Werner (Germany) Lucas Luhr**	**Audi R10 TDI**	M	**167**
4	**LMP1**	**2**	**(United States) Audi Sport North America**	**(Germany) Marco Werner (Germany) Lucas Luhr**	**Audi TDI 5.5 L Turbo V12 (Diesel)**	M	**167**
5	LMP2	15	(Mexico) Lowe's Fernández Racing	(Mexico) Adrian Fernández (Mexico) Luis Díaz	Acura ARX-01B	M	166
5	LMP2	15	(Mexico) Lowe's Fernández Racing	(Mexico) Adrian Fernández (Mexico) Luis Díaz	Acura AL7R 3.4 L V8	M	166
6	LMP2	26	(United States) Andretti Green Racing	(France) Franck Montagny (United States) Marco Andretti	Acura ARX-01B	M	165
6	LMP2	26	(United States) Andretti Green Racing	(France) Franck Montagny (United States) Marco Andretti	Acura AL7R 3.4 L V8	M	165
7 DNF	LMP2	20	(United States) Dyson Racing	(United States) Butch Leitzinger (United Kingdom) Marino Franchitti	Porsche RS Spyder Evo	M	164
7 DNF	LMP2	20	(United States) Dyson Racing	(United States) Butch Leitzinger (United Kingdom) Marino Franchitti	Porsche MR6 3.4 L V8	M	164
8	**GT1**	**3**	**(United States) Corvette Racing**	**(United States) Johnny O'Connell (Denmark) Jan Magnussen**	**Chevrolet Corvette C6.R**	M	**157**
8	**GT1**	**3**	**(United States) Corvette Racing**	**(United States) Johnny O'Connell (Denmark) Jan Magnussen**	**Chevrolet LS7-R 7.0 L V8 (E85 ethanol)**	M	**157**
9	**GT2**	**45**	**(United States) Flying Lizard Motorsports**	**(Germany) Jörg Bergmeister (Germany) Wolf Henzler**	**Porsche 997 GT3-RSR**	M	**154**
9	**GT2**	**45**	**(United States) Flying Lizard Motorsports**	**(Germany) Jörg Bergmeister (Germany) Wolf Henzler**	**Porsche 4.0 L Flat-6**	M	**154**
10	LMP1	37	(United States) Intersport Racing	(United States) Jon Field (United States) Clint Field (United States) Richard Berry	Lola B06/10	D	154
10	LMP1	37	(United States) Intersport Racing	(United States) Jon Field (United States) Clint Field (United States) Richard Berry	AER P32C 4.0 L Turbo V8 (E85 ethanol)	D	154
11	GT2	87	(United States) Farnbacher-Loles Motorsports	(United Kingdom) Richard Westbrook (Germany) Dirk Werner	Porsche 997 GT3-RSR	M	153
11	GT2	87	(United States) Farnbacher-Loles Motorsports	(United Kingdom) Richard Westbrook (Germany) Dirk Werner	Porsche 4.0 L Flat-6	M	153
12	GT2	62	(United States) Risi Competizione	(Brazil) Jaime Melo (Finland) Mika Salo	Ferrari F430GT	M	153
12	GT2	62	(United States) Risi Competizione	(Brazil) Jaime Melo (Finland) Mika Salo	Ferrari 4.0 L V8	M	153
13	GT2	71	(United States) Tafel Racing	(Germany) Dominik Farnbacher (Germany) Dirk Müller	Ferrari F430GT	M	152
13	GT2	71	(United States) Tafel Racing	(Germany) Dominik Farnbacher (Germany) Dirk Müller	Ferrari 4.0 L V8	M	152
14	LMP2	66	(United States) de Ferran Motorsports	(Brazil) Gil de Ferran (France) Simon Pagenaud	Acura ARX-01B	M	151
14	LMP2	66	(United States) de Ferran Motorsports	(Brazil) Gil de Ferran (France) Simon Pagenaud	Acura AL7R 3.4 L V8	M	151
15	GT2	21	(United States) Panoz Team PTG	(United States) Tommy Milner (United States) Tom Sutherland	Panoz Esperante GT-LM	D	150
15	GT2	21	(United States) Panoz Team PTG	(United States) Tommy Milner (United States) Tom Sutherland	Ford (Élan) 5.0 L V8	D	150
16 DNF	GT1	4	(United States) Corvette Racing	(United Kingdom) Oliver Gavin (Monaco) Olivier Beretta	Chevrolet Corvette C6.R	M	146
16 DNF	GT1	4	(United States) Corvette Racing	(United Kingdom) Oliver Gavin (Monaco) Olivier Beretta	Chevrolet LS7-R 7.0 L V8 (E85 ethanol)	M	146
17	GT2	61	(United States) Risi Competizione	(Austria) Patrick Friesacher (United States) Harrison Brix	Ferrari F430GT	M	145
17	GT2	61	(United States) Risi Competizione	(Austria) Patrick Friesacher (United States) Harrison Brix	Ferrari 4.0 L V8	M	145
18 DNF	GT2	46	(United States) Flying Lizard Motorsports	(United States) Johannes van Overbeek (France) Patrick Pilet	Porsche 997 GT3-RSR	M	144
18 DNF	GT2	46	(United States) Flying Lizard Motorsports	(United States) Johannes van Overbeek (France) Patrick Pilet	Porsche 4.0 L Flat-6	M	144
19	GT2	54	(United States) Black Swan Racing	(United States) Tim Pappas (United States) Anthony Lazzaro	Ford GT-R Mk.VII	F	142
19	GT2	54	(United States) Black Swan Racing	(United States) Tim Pappas (United States) Anthony Lazzaro	Ford 5.0 L V8	F	142
20	GT2	73	(United States) Tafel Racing	(United States) Jim Tafel (United States) Alex Figge	Ferrari F430GT	M	142
20	GT2	73	(United States) Tafel Racing	(United States) Jim Tafel (United States) Alex Figge	Ferrari 4.0 L V8	M	142
21	LMP1	1	(United States) Audi Sport North America	(Italy) Rinaldo Capello (Italy) Emanuele Pirro	Audi R10 TDI	M	137
21	LMP1	1	(United States) Audi Sport North America	(Italy) Rinaldo Capello (Italy) Emanuele Pirro	Audi TDI 5.5 L Turbo V12 (Diesel)	M	137
22 NC	GT2	11	(United States) Primetime Race Group	(United States) Joel Feinberg (United States) Chris Hall	Dodge Viper Competition Coupe	H	107
22 NC	GT2	11	(United States) Primetime Race Group	(United States) Joel Feinberg (United States) Chris Hall	Dodge 8.3 L V10	H	107
23 DNF	LMP2	16	(United States) Dyson Racing	(United States) Chris Dyson (United Kingdom) Guy Smith	Porsche RS Spyder Evo	M	94
23 DNF	LMP2	16	(United States) Dyson Racing	(United States) Chris Dyson (United Kingdom) Guy Smith	Porsche MR6 3.4 L V8	M	94
24 DNF	GT2	44	(United States) Flying Lizard Motorsports 44	(United States) Darren Law (United States) Seth Neiman	Porsche 997 GT3-RSR	M	81
24 DNF	GT2	44	(United States) Flying Lizard Motorsports 44	(United States) Darren Law (United States) Seth Neiman	Porsche 3.8 L Flat-6	M	81
25 DNF	LMP2	8	(United States) B-K Motorsports	(United States) Gerardo Bonilla (United Kingdom) Ben Devlin	Lola B07/46	Y	74
25 DNF	LMP2	8	(United States) B-K Motorsports	(United States) Gerardo Bonilla (United Kingdom) Ben Devlin	Mazda MZR-R 2.0 L Turbo I4 (E85 ethanol)	Y	74
26 DNF	GT1	008	(United States) Bell Motorsports	(United States) Terry Borcheller (United States) Chapman Ducote	Aston Martin DBR9	D	61
26 DNF	GT1	008	(United States) Bell Motorsports	(United States) Terry Borcheller (United States) Chapman Ducote	Aston Martin 6.0 L V12	D	61
27 DNF	GT2	007	(United Kingdom) Drayson-Barwell	(United Kingdom) Paul Drayson (United Kingdom) Jonny Cocker	Aston Martin V8 Vantage GT2	D	24
27 DNF	GT2	007	(United Kingdom) Drayson-Barwell	(United Kingdom) Paul Drayson (United Kingdom) Jonny Cocker	Aston Martin 4.5 L V8 (E85 ethanol)	D	24
DNS	GT2	40	(United States) Robertson Racing	(United States) David Robertson (United States) Andrea Robertson (United States) David Murry	Ford GT-R Mk.VII	D	-
DNS	GT2	40	(United States) Robertson Racing	(United States) David Robertson (United States) Andrea Robertson (United States) David Murry	Ford 5.0 L V8	D	-

== Statistics ==
- Pole Position - #9 Patrón Highcroft Racing - 0:46.696
- Fastest Lap - #1 Audi Sport North America - 0:48.007
- Average Speed - 91.105 mph

American Le Mans Series
Previous race: 2008 Utah Grand Prix	2008 season	Next race: 2008 Sports Car Challenge of Mid-Ohio
