= Acura ARX-01 =

Le Mans Prototype (LMP2) car

Acura ARX-01 HPD ARX-01
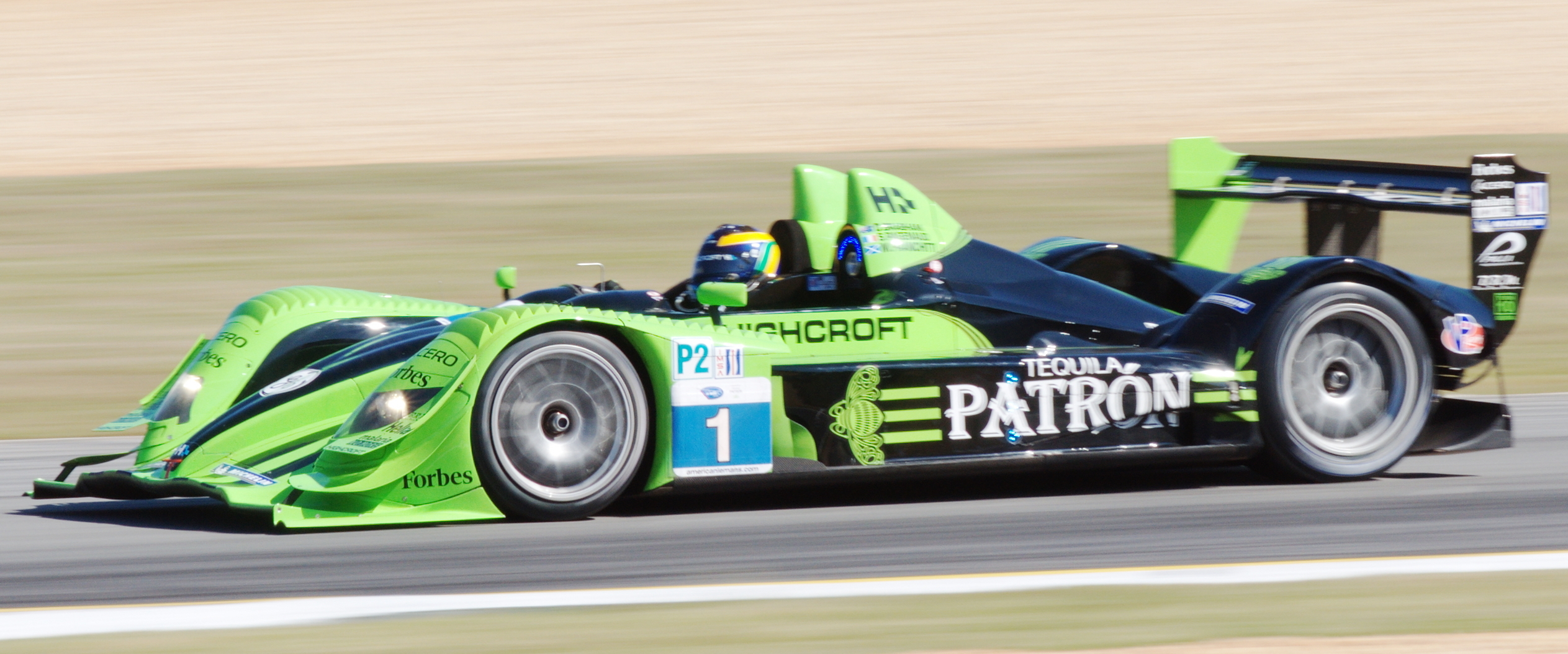
- Highcroft Racing's ARX-01c at 2010 Petit Le Mans
- Category: Le Mans Prototype (LMP2)
- Constructor: Acura (Wirth)
- Designer: Nick Wirth
- Successor: Acura ARX-02

Technical specifications
- Chassis: Carbon fibre and aluminium monocoque
- Suspension (front): Double wishbone, coil springs over damper, anti-roll bar
- Suspension (rear): Double wishbone, coil springs over damper, anti-roll bar
- Axle track: 2,000 mm (78.7 in)
- Wheelbase: 2,870 mm (113.0 in)
- Engine: 01a, 01B, 01C, 01e: Acura/HPD LM-V8 3.4-litre V8 naturally aspirated, mid-engined, longitudinally mounted. 01d, 01g: HPD HR28TT 2.8-litre V6 turbocharged, mid-engined, longitudinally mounted
- Transmission: 6-speed sequential manual
- Weight: appr. 825 kg (1,818.8 lb)
- Fuel: VP Racing Fuels + EPIC Ethanol E10 (ALMS)
- Lubricants: Various per teams
- Tyres: Michelin, Dunlop

Competition history
- Notable entrants: (United States) Andretti Green Racing (United States) Highcroft Racing (Mexico) Fernández Racing (United States) de Ferran Motorsports (United Kingdom) Strakka Racing (United Kingdom) RML (United States) Level 5 Motorsports
- Notable drivers: (Australia) David Brabham (United States) Scott Sharp (Brazil) Gil de Ferran (France) Simon Pagenaud (United Kingdom) Marino Franchitti (France) Franck Montagny (United Kingdom) James Rossiter (Brazil) Tony Kanaan (United States) Bryan Herta (Mexico) Luis Díaz (Mexico) Adrian Fernández (United States) Scott Tucker (France) Christophe Bouchut (United Kingdom) Danny Watts (United Kingdom) Jonny Kane
- Debut: 2007 12 Hours of Sebring
- First win: 2007 12 Hours of Sebring
- Last win: 2011 Petit Le Mans
- Last event: 2011 Petit Le Mans
Races	Wins
57	24
- Teams' Championships: 3 (2009 ALMS LMP2, 2010 ALMS LMP, 2011 ALMS LMP2)
- Constructors' Championships: 2 (2009 ALMS LMP2, 2010 ALMS LMP)
- Drivers' Championships: 3 (2009 ALMS LMP2, 2010 ALMS LMP, 2011 ALMS LMP2)

The Acura ARX-01, later known as the HPD ARX-01, is a series of Le Mans Prototypes built for sports car racing, specifically in the American Le Mans Series, Le Mans Series, and at the 24 Hours of Le Mans. It is the first purpose-built race car by the Acura division of Honda Motor Company, part of their multi-year program to eventually compete in endurance racing. The car debuted in 2007 in the American Le mans Series before expanding to customers in Europe. Over the years various specifications of the ARX-01 chassis have been developed, each signified by a letter suffix. In 2010 Acura withdrew their name from the program and Honda Performance Development which developed the car for Acura continued the program into 2011.

== Development ==
At the 2006 North American International Auto Show in Detroit, Acura officially announced their plans to develop a Le Mans Prototype program for the American Le Mans Series, competing in the LMP2 class for the initial year of competition in 2007. Acura announced they would be using customer chassis from Lola Cars International of the United Kingdom and Courage Compétition of France, while the engine would be built entirely by Honda Performance Development of the United States. Acura planned to use the customer chassis for the first year, then to build their own chassis for 2008, followed by another new chassis for a move to the top LMP1 class in 2009. At the Detroit auto show, Acura showed their first customer chassis, a brand new Courage LC75.

Following the announcement of the three teams involved in the project, Acura announced that for 2007 each team would concentrate on a certain aspect of development for the planned 2008 car. Andretti Green Racing and Highcroft Racing would use Courage LC75 chassis, and work on chassis design and aerodynamic modification. The third team, Fernández Racing, would use a Lola chassis and concentrate on developing the new Acura V8 engine. A third Courage LC75 would be retained by Honda of America for use as a developmental prototype.

By early 2007, all three teams had begun testing their cars as well as beginning modification. By the time the American Le Mans Series opening round at the 12 Hours of Sebring arrived, the two Courage LC75 teams had modified their chassis to such an extent that Acura applied for homologation from the International Motor Sports Association (IMSA) and Automobile Club de l'Ouest (ACO). With the application approved, the Acura Courage LC75s were renamed as Acura ARX-01a.

As for the engine, Honda Performance Development (HPD) created a new 3.4-liter V8, the maximum size allowed by the rules, the first V8 ever branded as an Acura as well as the first motor built entirely in the United States by Honda. Elements of the Acura V8, dubbed the AL7R, share similar architecture with the Honda engine used in the Indy Racing League although none of the parts are interchangeable.

== Racing history ==
=== 2007 ===
The two new Acura ARX-01as, along with the other Lola team car, debuted at the 2007 12 Hours of Sebring after much preparation. Battling not only the Porsche squads in their own class, they also attempted to compete with the Audi R10 diesels in the higher LMP1 class throughout the race. During the race the ARX-01a showed the ability to at least keep close to the Audi, yet was unable to truly fight for the lead. However, in the end the Acura ARX-01a of Andretti Green Racing was able to survive the race better than other competitors and managed to take the class victory, as well as second place overall. The second ARX-01a of Highcroft Racing took sixth place overall, while the Acura-powered Lola of Fernández Racing took third.

In the third race of the season at Long Beach, Acura gained their first overall pole, with the Andretti Green Racing ARX-01a outpacing the two Penske Racing Porsche RS Spyders and the Audi R10s.

=== 2008 ===
On July 12, 2008, the #9 Patrón Highcroft Racing ARX-01 earned Acura's first-ever overall victory in the American Le Mans Series. David Brabham and Scott Sharp started the Highcroft entry from pole, and managed to retake the lead from the #7 Penske Racing Porsche RS Spyder in the final 90 seconds of the Northeast Grand Prix. This was followed by a second overall win at the Detroit Sports Car Challenge, this time led by Andretti Green Racing's Franck Montagny and James Rossiter.

The Acura ARX-01b won six of the eleven races in the LMP2 class for 2008, with four for Highcroft and two for Andretti Green. Highcroft was ranked second in the Teams Championship, Andretti Green fourth, Fernandez fifth, and de Ferran sixth. Acura lost the LMP2 constructors championship to Porsche by a single point.

=== 2009 ===
In 2009, Fernandez Racing continued to compete with an updated version of the ARX-01, while Acura unveiled an LMP1 class ARX-02 for Highcroft Racing and de Ferran Motorsports. By the end of the season, Fernandez Racing won the LMP2 teams', drivers' and manufacturers' championship.

=== 2010 ===
For 2010, Highcroft Racing has discontinued its campaign of the LMP1-spec ARX-02 and returns to an upgraded version of the ARX-01. The car also made its debut in Europe, in the Le Mans Series, run by Strakka Racing. Both teams will run the ARX-01c at Le Mans, however, Highcroft Racing will continue to use the higher-downforce ARX-01b configuration in the American Le Mans Series until after the Le Mans 24 Hours.

Highcroft faced stiff competition but was able to beat the Cytosport Porsche by 20 points despite running a 25 kg series-imposed ballast. The team won 4 victories and extended the points lead further when Cytosport was absent from Lime Rock due to a crash. Drayson Racing and Dyson Racing also ran in ALMS and had a straight-line speed advantage over Highcroft, becoming most obvious in the Miller Motosport Park.

Strakka's HPD in the Le Mans Series proved to be superior to the opposition in class. In all of the 5 races in the series, the car was at least 2 seconds quicker than their nearest rival. A 7-minute repair would not stop them from winning at Paul Ricard. They also won LMP2 at Silverstone despite accidents and won overall at Hungaroring. The win at Hungary was the first ever in LMS history that an LMP2 car finished ahead of LMP1. However 2 DNFs out of 5 races meant that Strakka missed out on the championship to the more consistent RML team, who ran a Lola chassis with an HPD engine.

Both Strakka and Highcroft competed at Le Mans for 2010, with the latter running a conservative pace for the unproven reliability. Ironically it was the Highcroft that was dodged with water leak issues. Strakka had already experimented with low-downforce aero in LMS and got the better hand. They set a new LMP2 class lap record, led from pole to finish, won the LMP2 class, finished 5th overall (best result ever for an LMP2) and won the Michelin Green X Challenge across all class.

=== 2011 ===
Highcroft Racing originally intended to compete in the ALMS LMP1 category using the ARX-01e powered by the HPD 3.4-liter V8 engine. The team took delivery only a week before the Sebring 12 Hours but was able to convert it into a 2nd-place finish. The ACO finally appeared to have been able to level out the competition level between the petrol and diesel, although this belief was shattered immediately at the Le Mans test, which saw the top petrol runners more than 10 seconds (up to 20 for the Aston Martin AMR-One) adrift from the pacesetter Audi R18.

Highcroft did not appear at the Long Beach round and begun to take more serious involvement in the IRL program. On May 16, Highcroft finally announced the end of their partnership with Honda, citing the earthquake in Japan that eventually caused financial troubles at Honda. The ARX-01e will not appear at Le Mans and will not be raced anymore. Only RML and Strakka were left to campaign the ARX-01d in the Le Mans Series.

The ARX-01d, fitted with HPD's new LMP2 stock-block V6 engine, had been run in the Le Mans Series and at Le Mans by defending Le Mans LMP2 winners Strakka Racing and by defending LMS LMP2 champions RML. At the Paul Ricard test the cars were very slow due to the level of engine development prior to homologation. RML stated that they were literally the slowest car of the whole field, and that "there's not a class out there that can't drive by us on the straight". They did mention that the car was not in low drag configuration so the car was not in an optimally efficient condition.

The ACO increased the restrictor for both cars by 1.2% before the 1000 km of Spa, but both RML and Strakka were still slower than the Nissans. RML did not get to start the race due to a collision with the #9 Peugeot in one of the practice sessions.

Level 5 Motorsports announced they will now utilize the HPD ARX-01gs, Honda's cost-capped chassis and engine combination, in the remaining 2011 American Le Mans Series and Intercontinental Le Mans Cup rounds. Designed and developed by Wirth Research in Bicester in the UK, the car made an instant impression winning the LMP2 class on debut at the Laguna Seca six-hours and then even more impressively two weeks later at Road Atlanta's 1000-mile Petit Le Mans.

=== Complete American Le Mans Series results ===
(key) Races in bold indicates pole position. Races in italics indicates fastest lap.

Complete American Le Mans Series results
Year	Entrant	Class	Drivers	No.	Rds.	Rounds												Pts.	Pos.
Year	Entrant	Class	Drivers	No.	Rds.	1	2	3	4	5	6	7	8	9	10	11	12	Pts.	Pos.
2007	(United States) Highcroft Racing	LMP2	(Australia) David Brabham (Sweden) Stefan Johansson (United States) Duncan Dayton (United Kingdom) Robbie Kerr	9	All; All; 1; 11-12	SEB; 2	STP; 3	LNB; 4	**TEX**; **4**	UTA; 6	LIM; 3	MID; 6	AME; 3	MOS; DNF	DET; 3	PET; 6	MON; DNF	115	3rd
2007	(United States) Andretti Green Racing	LMP2	(United States) Bryan Herta (United Kingdom) Dario Franchitti (Brazil) Tony Kanaan (United Kingdom) Marino Franchitti (Brazil) Vítor Meira	26	All; 1, 3; 1, 11-12; 2, 4-10; 11	SEB; 1	STP; 4	**LNB**; **6**	TEX; 2	UTA; DNF	LIM; 6	MID; 7	AME; 7	MOS; 3	DET; 8	PET; DNF	MON; 4	98	5th
2008	(United States) Patrón Highcroft Racing	LMP2	(Australia) David Brabham (United States) Scott Sharp (Sweden) Stefan Johansson (United Kingdom) Dario Franchitti	9	All; All; 1; 10	SEB; 4	STP; 2	LBH; 1	UTA; 9	**LRP**; **1**	MDO; 2	ELK; 1	MOS; 1	**DET**; **2**	PET; DNF	**LAG**; **9**		162	2nd
2008	(Mexico) Lowe's Fernández Racing	LMP2	(Mexico) Adrian Fernández (Mexico) Luis Díaz (Mexico) Michel Jourdain Jr.	15	All; All; 10	SEB; DSQ	STP; 7	LBH; 6	UTA; 5	LRP; 4	MDO; 3	ELK; 9†	MOS; 2	DET; 9	PET; 8†	LAG; 7		88	5th
2008	(United States) Andretti Green Racing	LMP2	(United States) Bryan Herta (Brazil) Christian Fittipaldi (United States) Marco Andretti (France) Franck Montagny (Brazil) Raphael Matos (United Kingdom) James Rossiter (Brazil) Tony Kanaan	26	1-4; 1-4; 1, 5, 10; 5-11; 6; 7-9; 10	SEB; 6†	STP; 5	LBH; 4	UTA; 7	LRP; 5	MDO; 7	**ELK**; **7†**	MOS; 4	DET; 1	PET; 7†	LAG; 1		128	4th
2008	(United States) de Ferran Motorsport	LMP2	(Brazil) Gil de Ferran (France) Simon Pagenaud (New Zealand) Scott Dixon	66	4-11; 4-11; 10	SEB	STP	LBH	UTA; 3	LRP; 7	**MDO**; **DNF**	ELK; 8	MOS; 5†	DET; 3	PET; 5	LAG; 2		85	6th
2009	(Mexico) Lowe's Fernández Racing	LMP2	(Mexico) Adrian Fernández (Mexico) Luis Díaz	15	All; All	**SEB**; **1†**	**STP**; **1**	**LBH**; **1**	**UTA**; 1	**LIM**; **2**	**MOH**; 1	ELK; 1	MOS; 1	ATL; 2	**LGA**; **1**			217	1st
2010	(United States) Patrón Highcroft Racing	LMP2	(Australia) David Brabham (France) Simon Pagenaud (United Kingdom) Marino Franchitti	1	1, 9; 1, 9; 1, 9	**SEB**; **2**								ATL; 1				182	1st
2010	(United States) Patrón Highcroft Racing	LMP	(Australia) David Brabham (France) Simon Pagenaud (United Kingdom) Marino Franchitti	1	2-7; 2-7; 3		LBH; 1	LGA; 1	**MIL**; 1	**LRP**; 2	MDO; 2	ROA; 3						182	1st
2010	(United States) Patrón Highcroft Racing	LMP	(Australia) David Brabham (France) Simon Pagenaud	100	8; 8								MOS; 2					182	1st
2011	(United States) Highcroft Racing	LMP1	(Australia) David Brabham (France) Simon Pagenaud (United Kingdom) Marino Franchitti	01	1; 1; 1	SEB; 2	LBH	LRP	MOS	MDO	ROA	BAL	LGA	ATL				0	NC
2011	(United States) Level 5 Motorsports	LMP2	(United States) Scott Tucker (France) Christophe Bouchut (Mexico) Luis Díaz (United Kingdom) Marino Franchitti	055	8-9; 8; 8-9; 9	SEB	LBH	LRP	MOS	MDO	ROA	BAL	**LGA**; **1**	**ATL**; 5				130*	1st*
2011	(United States) Level 5 Motorsports	LMP2	(Portugal) João Barbosa (France) Christophe Bouchut (United States) Scott Tucker	33	9; 9; 9									ATL; 1				0	NC

^{†} Did not finish the race but was classified as they completed more than 70% of the race distance.

^{*} Point were scored with the Lola B08/80 & Lola B11/40

=== Complete Le Mans Series results ===
(key) Races in bold indicates pole position. Races in italics indicates fastest lap.

Complete Le Mans Series results
Year	Entrant	Class	Drivers	No.	Rds.	Rounds					Pts.	Pos.
Year	Entrant	Class	Drivers	No.	Rds.	1	2	3	4	5	Pts.	Pos.
2010	(United Kingdom) Strakka Racing	LMP2	(United Kingdom) Danny Watts (United Kingdom) Jonny Kane (United Kingdom) Nick Leventis	42	All; All; All	**LEC**; **1**	**SPA**; **Ret**	**POR**; **Ret**	**HUN**; **1**	**SIL**; **1**	69	2nd
2011	(United Kingdom) RML	LMP2	(United Kingdom) Mike Newton (Brazil) Thomas Erdos (United Kingdom) Ben Collins	36	1-4; 1-4; 1-4	LEC; 7	SPA; DNS	IMO; 11	SIL; 4	EST	17	9th
2011	(United Kingdom) Strakka Racing	LMP2	(United Kingdom) Danny Watts (United Kingdom) Jonny Kane (United Kingdom) Nick Leventis	42	All; All; All	LEC; 3	**SPA**; **3**	IMO; 6	**SIL**; **8**	EST; 6	43	2nd

=== Complete 24 Hours of Le Mans results ===
(key) Races in bold indicates pole position. Races in italics indicates fastest lap.

Complete 24 Hours of Le Mans results
Year	Team	Class	No.	Drivers	Position
2010	(United States) Highcroft Racing	LMP2	26	(Australia) David Brabham (United Kingdom) Marino Franchitti (Germany) Marco Werner	9th
2010	(United Kingdom) Strakka Racing	LMP2	42	(United Kingdom) Nick Leventis (United Kingdom) Danny Watts (United Kingdom) Jonny Kane	**1st**
2011	(United Kingdom) RML	LMP2	36	(United Kingdom) Mike Newton (United Kingdom) Ben Collins (Brazil) Thomas Erdos	4th
2011	(United Kingdom) Strakka Racing	LMP2	42	(United Kingdom) Nick Leventis (United Kingdom) Danny Watts (United Kingdom) Jonny Kane	Ret

== Gallery ==
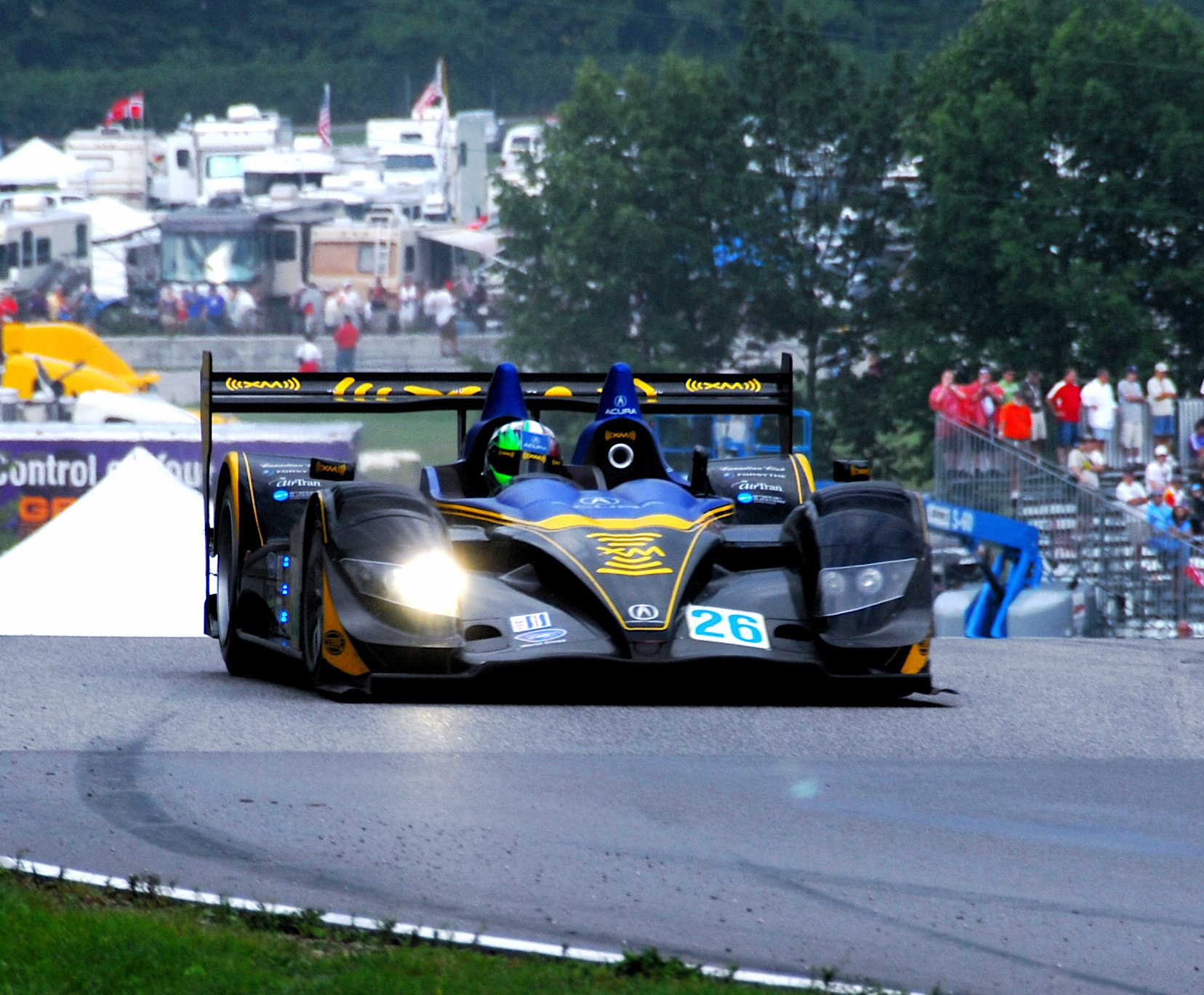
Andretti Green Racing's ARX-01a at Road America

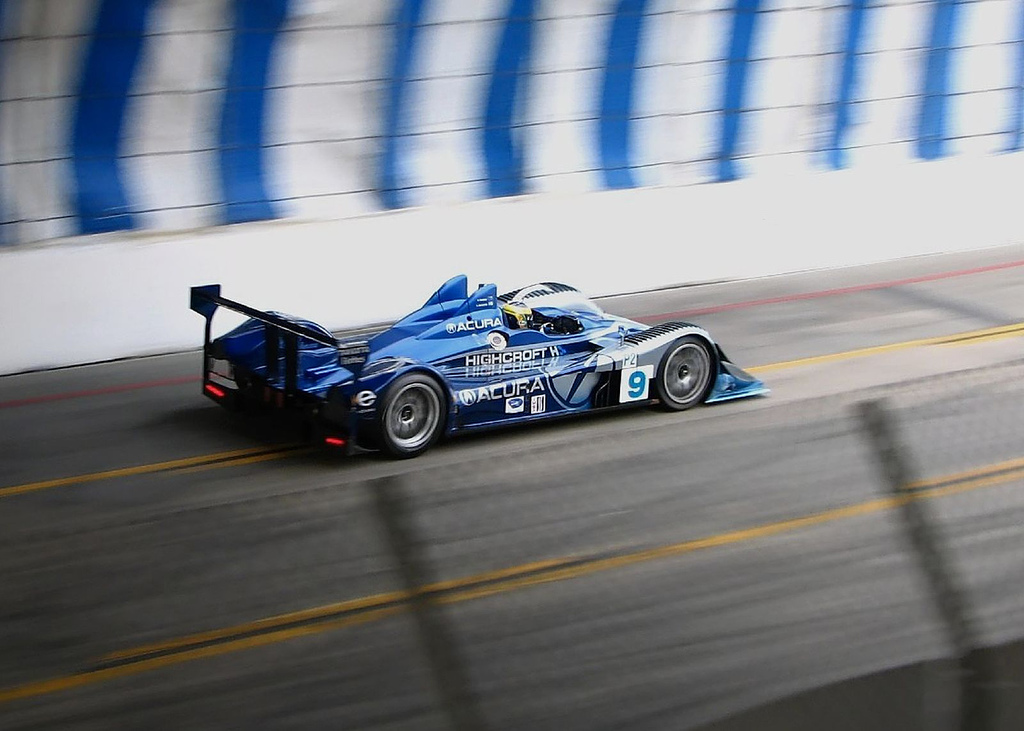
Highcroft Racing's Acura ARX-01a at Long Beach

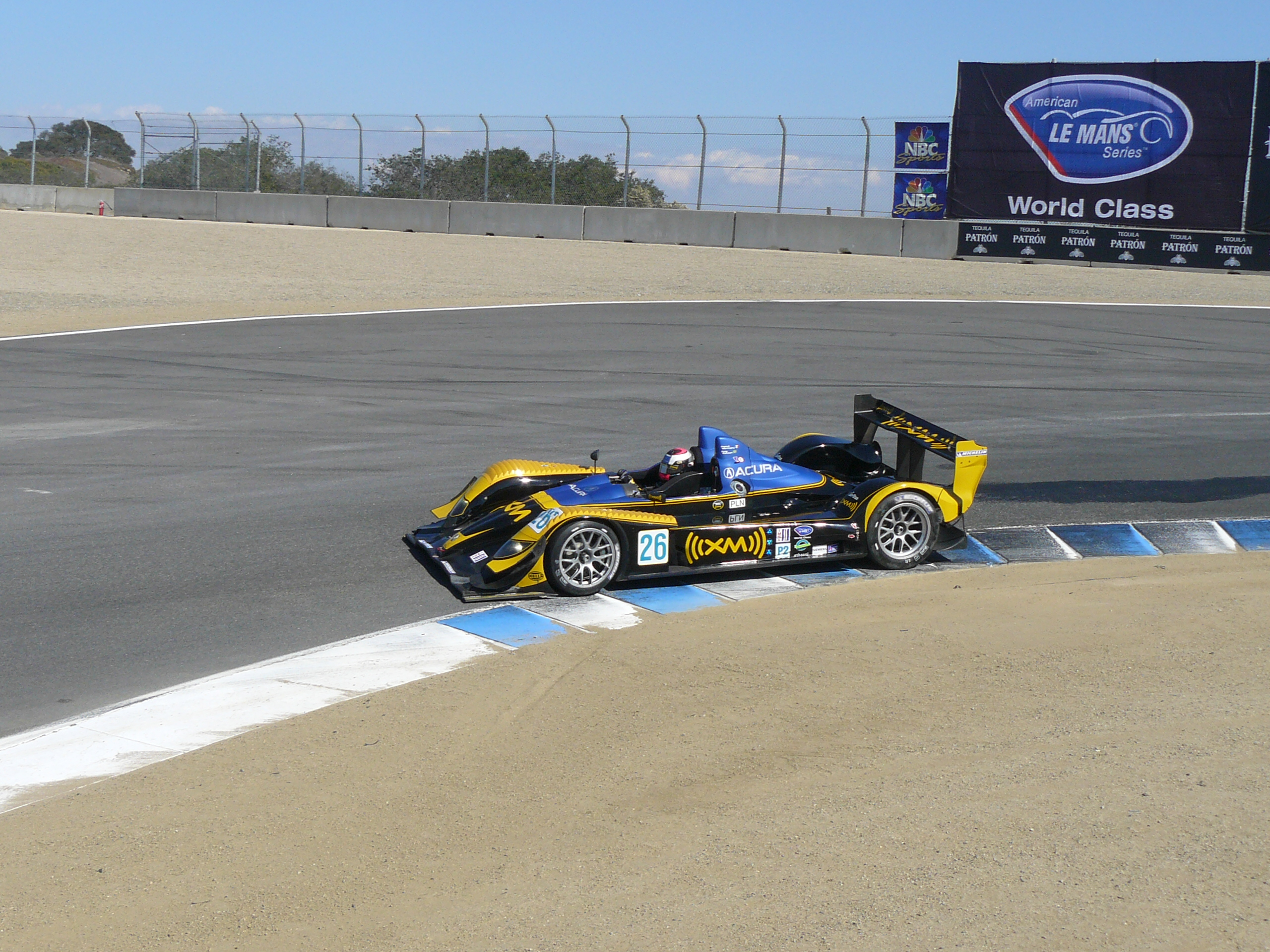
Andretti Green Racing's Acura ARX-01b at Mazda Raceway Laguna Seca

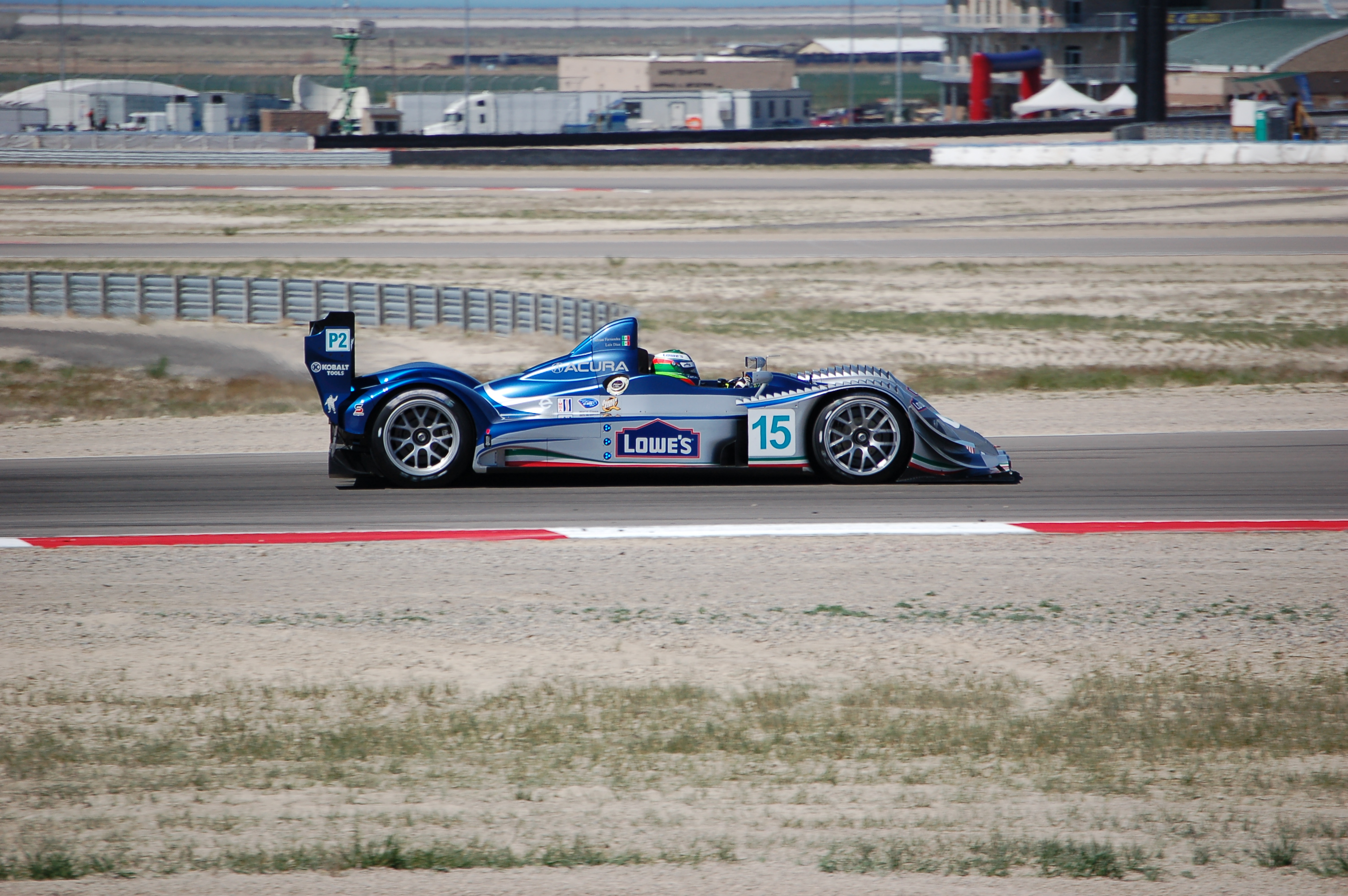
Fernandez Racing's Acura ARX-01b at Miller Motorsports Park

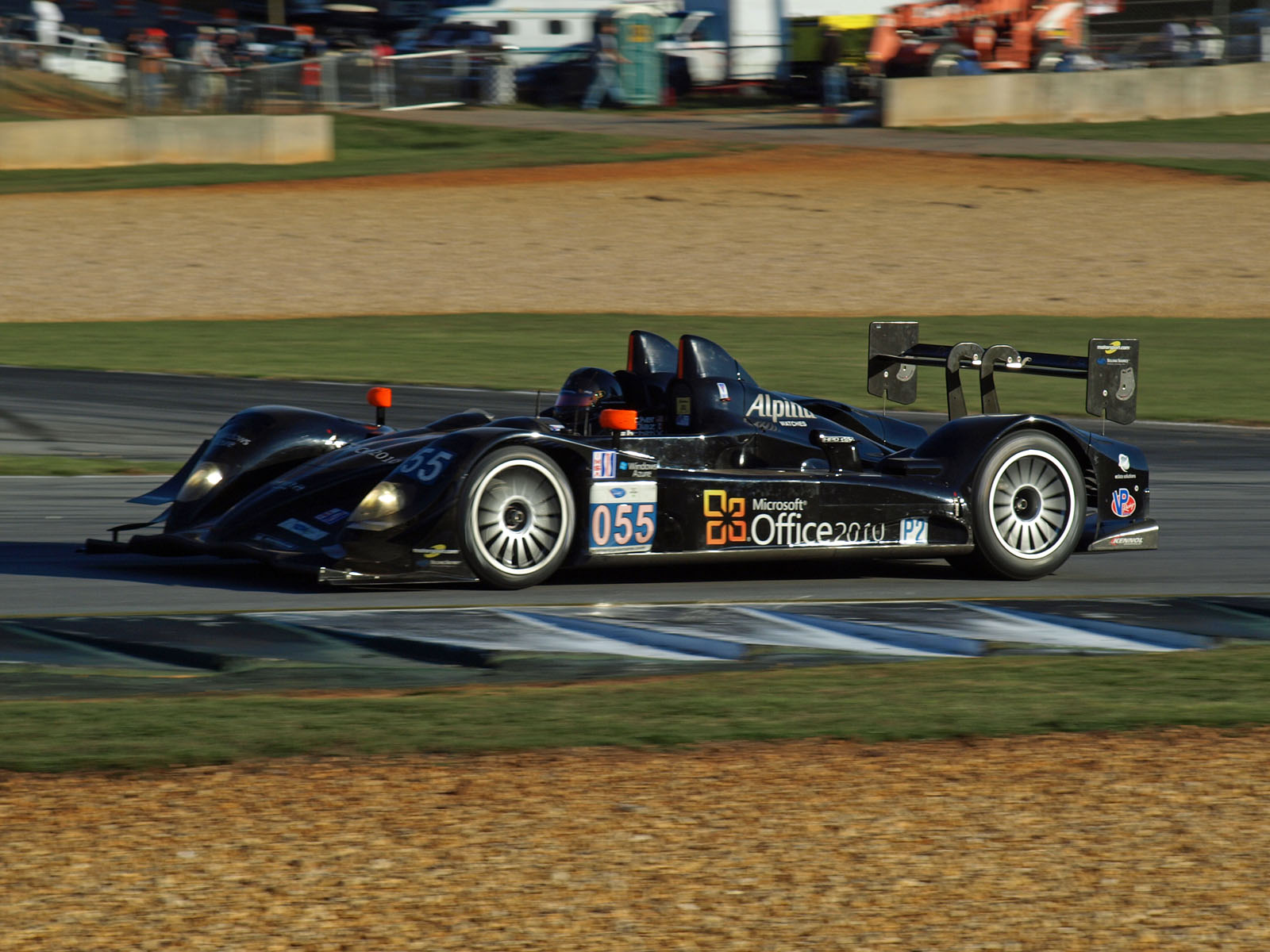
Level 5 Motorsports HPD ARX-01g at Road Atlanta
