= 2007 Sports Car Challenge of Mid-Ohio =

The layout of Mid-Ohio Sports Car Course

The 2007 Acura Sports Car Challenge of Mid Ohio was the seventh round of the 2007 American Le Mans Series season. It took place at the Mid-Ohio Sports Car Course on July 21, 2007.

== Official results ==
Class winners in bold. Cars failing to complete 70% of winner's distance marked as Not Classified (NC).

Pos	Class	No	Team	Drivers	Chassis	Tyre	Laps
Pos	Class	No	Team	Drivers	Engine	Tyre	Laps
1	**LMP2**	**7**	**(United States) Penske Racing**	**(France) Romain Dumas (Germany) Timo Bernhard**	**Porsche RS Spyder Evo**	MI	**134**
1	**LMP2**	**7**	**(United States) Penske Racing**	**(France) Romain Dumas (Germany) Timo Bernhard**	**Porsche MR6 3.4L V8**	MI	**134**
2	LMP2	6	(United States) Penske Racing	(Germany) Sascha Maassen (Australia) Ryan Briscoe	Porsche RS Spyder Evo	MI	134
2	LMP2	6	(United States) Penske Racing	(Germany) Sascha Maassen (Australia) Ryan Briscoe	Porsche MR6 3.4L V8	MI	134
3	**LMP1**	**2**	**(United States) Audi Sport North America**	**(Italy) Emanuele Pirro (Germany) Marco Werner**	**Audi R10 TDI**	MI	**134**
3	**LMP1**	**2**	**(United States) Audi Sport North America**	**(Italy) Emanuele Pirro (Germany) Marco Werner**	**Audi TDI 5.5L Turbo V12 (Diesel)**	MI	**134**
4	LMP2	15	(Mexico) Lowe's Fernández Racing	(Mexico) Adrian Fernández (Mexico) Luis Diaz	Lola B06/43	MI	134
4	LMP2	15	(Mexico) Lowe's Fernández Racing	(Mexico) Adrian Fernández (Mexico) Luis Diaz	Acura AL7R 3.4L V8	MI	134
5	LMP1	1	(United States) Audi Sport North America	(Italy) Rinaldo Capello (United Kingdom) Allan McNish	Audi R10 TDI	MI	134
5	LMP1	1	(United States) Audi Sport North America	(Italy) Rinaldo Capello (United Kingdom) Allan McNish	Audi TDI 5.5L Turbo V12 (Diesel)	MI	134
6	LMP2	16	(United States) Dyson Racing	(United States) Butch Leitzinger (United Kingdom) Andy Wallace	Porsche RS Spyder Evo	MI	133
6	LMP2	16	(United States) Dyson Racing	(United States) Butch Leitzinger (United Kingdom) Andy Wallace	Porsche MR6 3.4L V8	MI	133
7	LMP2	20	(United States) Dyson Racing	(United States) Chris Dyson (United Kingdom) Guy Smith	Porsche RS Spyder Evo	MI	133
7	LMP2	20	(United States) Dyson Racing	(United States) Chris Dyson (United Kingdom) Guy Smith	Porsche MR6 3.4L V8	MI	133
8	LMP2	9	(United States) Highcroft Racing	(Australia) David Brabham (Sweden) Stefan Johansson (United States) Duncan Dayton	Acura ARX-01a	MI	132
8	LMP2	9	(United States) Highcroft Racing	(Australia) David Brabham (Sweden) Stefan Johansson (United States) Duncan Dayton	Acura AL7R 3.4L V8	MI	132
9	LMP1	06	(United States) Team Cytosport	(United States) Greg Pickett (Germany) Klaus Graf	Lola B06/10	MI	128
9	LMP1	06	(United States) Team Cytosport	(United States) Greg Pickett (Germany) Klaus Graf	AER P32T 3.6L Turbo V8	MI	128
10	LMP2	26	(United States) Andretti Green Racing	(United States) Bryan Herta (United Kingdom) Marino Franchitti	Acura ARX-01a	MI	126
10	LMP2	26	(United States) Andretti Green Racing	(United States) Bryan Herta (United Kingdom) Marino Franchitti	Acura AL7R 3.4L V8	MI	126
11	**GT1**	**4**	**(United States) Corvette Racing**	**(United Kingdom) Oliver Gavin (Monaco) Olivier Beretta**	**Chevrolet Corvette C6.R**	MI	**125**
11	**GT1**	**4**	**(United States) Corvette Racing**	**(United Kingdom) Oliver Gavin (Monaco) Olivier Beretta**	**Chevrolet LS7.R 7.0L V8**	MI	**125**
12	GT1	3	(United States) Corvette Racing	(United States) Johnny O'Connell (Denmark) Jan Magnussen	Chevrolet Corvette C6.R	MI	125
12	GT1	3	(United States) Corvette Racing	(United States) Johnny O'Connell (Denmark) Jan Magnussen	Chevrolet LS7.R 7.0L V8	MI	125
13	LMP2	19	(United States) Van der Steur Racing	(United States) Gunnar van der Steur (United States) Adam Pecorari	Radical SR9	KU	119
13	LMP2	19	(United States) Van der Steur Racing	(United States) Gunnar van der Steur (United States) Adam Pecorari	AER P07 2.0L Turbo I4	KU	119
14	**GT2**	**45**	**(United States) Flying Lizard Motorsports**	**(United States) Johannes van Overbeek (Germany) Jörg Bergmeister**	**Porsche 997 GT3-RSR**	MI	**118**
14	**GT2**	**45**	**(United States) Flying Lizard Motorsports**	**(United States) Johannes van Overbeek (Germany) Jörg Bergmeister**	**Porsche 3.8L Flat-6**	MI	**118**
15	GT2	62	(United States) Risi Competizione	(Finland) Mika Salo (Brazil) Jaime Melo	Ferrari F430 GT2	MI	116
15	GT2	62	(United States) Risi Competizione	(Finland) Mika Salo (Brazil) Jaime Melo	Ferrari 4.0L V8	MI	116
16	GT2	61	(United States) Risi Competizione	(Italy) Gianmaria Bruni (France) Éric Hélary	Ferrari F430 GT2	MI	116
16	GT2	61	(United States) Risi Competizione	(Italy) Gianmaria Bruni (France) Éric Hélary	Ferrari 4.0L V8	MI	116
17	GT2	44	(United States) Flying Lizard Motorsports	(United States) Lonnie Pechnik (United States) Seth Neiman	Porsche 997 GT3-RSR	MI	114
17	GT2	44	(United States) Flying Lizard Motorsports	(United States) Lonnie Pechnik (United States) Seth Neiman	Porsche 3.8L Flat-6	MI	114
18	GT2	31	(United States) Petersen Motorsports (United States) White Lightning Racing	(Czech Republic) Tomáš Enge (United Kingdom) Darren Turner	Ferrari F430 GT2	MI	113
18	GT2	31	(United States) Petersen Motorsports (United States) White Lightning Racing	(Czech Republic) Tomáš Enge (United Kingdom) Darren Turner	Ferrari 4.0L V8	MI	113
19	GT2	54	(United States) Team Trans Sport Racing	(United States) Tim Pappas (United States) Terry Borcheller	Porsche 997 GT3-RSR	Y	114
19	GT2	54	(United States) Team Trans Sport Racing	(United States) Tim Pappas (United States) Terry Borcheller	Porsche 3.8L Flat-6	Y	114
20	LMP1	12	(United States) Autocon Motorsports	(United States) Chris McMurry (United States) Brian Willman	Creation CA06/H	D	97
20	LMP1	12	(United States) Autocon Motorsports	(United States) Chris McMurry (United States) Brian Willman	Judd GV5 S2 5.0L V10	D	97
21	LMP1	37	(United States) Intersport Racing	(United States) Jon Field (United States) Clint Field (United States) Richard Berry	Creation CA06/H	KU	96
21	LMP1	37	(United States) Intersport Racing	(United States) Jon Field (United States) Clint Field (United States) Richard Berry	Judd GV5 S2 5.0L V10	KU	96
22	GT2	13	(United States) Woodhouse Performance	(United States) Cindi Lux (United States) Stan Wilson	Dodge Viper Competition Coupe	KU	95
22	GT2	13	(United States) Woodhouse Performance	(United States) Cindi Lux (United States) Stan Wilson	Dodge 8.3L V10	KU	95
23 NC	GT2	18	(United States) Rahal Letterman Racing	(United States) Tom Milner Jr. (Germany) Ralf Kelleners	Porsche 997 GT3-RSR	MI	92
23 NC	GT2	18	(United States) Rahal Letterman Racing	(United States) Tom Milner Jr. (Germany) Ralf Kelleners	Porsche 3.8L Flat-6	MI	92
24 NC	GT2	71	(United States) Tafel Racing	(Germany) Wolf Henzler (United Kingdom) Robin Liddell	Porsche 997 GT3-RSR	MI	83
24 NC	GT2	71	(United States) Tafel Racing	(Germany) Wolf Henzler (United Kingdom) Robin Liddell	Porsche 3.8L Flat-6	MI	83
25 NC	GT2	73	(United States) Tafel Racing	(United States) Jim Tafel (Germany) Dominik Farnbacher	Porsche 997 GT3-RSR	MI	80
25 NC	GT2	73	(United States) Tafel Racing	(United States) Jim Tafel (Germany) Dominik Farnbacher	Porsche 3.8L Flat-6	MI	80
26 DNF	GT2	21	(United States) Panoz Team PTG	(United States) Bill Auberlen (United States) Joey Hand	Panoz Esperante GT-LM	Y	49
26 DNF	GT2	21	(United States) Panoz Team PTG	(United States) Bill Auberlen (United States) Joey Hand	Ford (Élan) 5.0L V8	Y	49
27 DNF	LMP2	8	(United States) B-K Motorsports (Japan) Mazdaspeed	(United States) Jamie Bach (United Kingdom) Ben Devlin	Lola B07/46	KU	19
27 DNF	LMP2	8	(United States) B-K Motorsports (Japan) Mazdaspeed	(United States) Jamie Bach (United Kingdom) Ben Devlin	Mazda MZR-R 2.0L Turbo I4	KU	19

== Statistics ==
- Pole Position - #7 Penske Racing - 1:08.510
- Fastest Lap - #7 Penske Racing - 1:10.113
- Margin of Victory - 2.360

American Le Mans Series
Previous race: 2007 Northeast Grand Prix	2007 season	Next race: 2007 Road America 500
