= 2007 Road America 500 =

Track map of Road America.

The 2007 Generac 500 at Road America was the eighth round of the 2007 American Le Mans Series season. It took place at Road America on August 11, 2007.

Due to heavy rain and lightning during the race, over an hour of this four-hour event was run continuously under caution due to unsafe conditions.

== Official results ==
Class winners in bold. Cars failing to complete 70% of winner's distance marked as Not Classified (NC).

Pos	Class	No	Team	Drivers	Chassis	Tyre	Laps
Pos	Class	No	Team	Drivers	Engine	Tyre	Laps
1	**LMP2**	**7**	**(United States) Penske Racing**	**(France) Romain Dumas (Germany) Timo Bernhard**	**Porsche RS Spyder Evo**	MI	**96**
1	**LMP2**	**7**	**(United States) Penske Racing**	**(France) Romain Dumas (Germany) Timo Bernhard**	**Porsche MR6 3.4L V8**	MI	**96**
2	**LMP1**	**1**	**(United States) Audi Sport North America**	**(Italy) Rinaldo Capello (United Kingdom) Allan McNish**	**Audi R10 TDI**	MI	**96**
2	**LMP1**	**1**	**(United States) Audi Sport North America**	**(Italy) Rinaldo Capello (United Kingdom) Allan McNish**	**Audi 5.5L TDI V12 (Diesel)**	MI	**96**
3	LMP1	2	(United States) Audi Sport North America	(Italy) Emanuele Pirro (Germany) Marco Werner	Audi R10 TDI	MI	96
3	LMP1	2	(United States) Audi Sport North America	(Italy) Emanuele Pirro (Germany) Marco Werner	Audi 5.5L TDI V12 (Diesel)	MI	96
4	LMP2	6	(United States) Penske Racing	(Germany) Sascha Maassen (Australia) Ryan Briscoe	Porsche RS Spyder Evo	MI	96
4	LMP2	6	(United States) Penske Racing	(Germany) Sascha Maassen (Australia) Ryan Briscoe	Porsche MR6 3.4L V8	MI	96
5	LMP2	9	(United States) Highcroft Racing	(Australia) David Brabham (Sweden) Stefan Johansson	Acura ARX-01a	MI	94
5	LMP2	9	(United States) Highcroft Racing	(Australia) David Brabham (Sweden) Stefan Johansson	Acura AL7R 3.4L V8	MI	94
6	LMP2	20	(United States) Dyson Racing	(United States) Chris Dyson (United Kingdom) Guy Smith	Porsche RS Spyder Evo	MI	94
6	LMP2	20	(United States) Dyson Racing	(United States) Chris Dyson (United Kingdom) Guy Smith	Porsche MR6 3.4L V8	MI	94
7	LMP2	16	(United States) Dyson Racing	(United States) Butch Leitzinger (United Kingdom) Andy Wallace	Porsche RS Spyder Evo	MI	94
7	LMP2	16	(United States) Dyson Racing	(United States) Butch Leitzinger (United Kingdom) Andy Wallace	Porsche MR6 3.4L V8	MI	94
8	LMP2	15	(Mexico) Lowe's Fernández Racing	(Mexico) Adrian Fernández (Mexico) Luis Diaz	Lola B06/43	MI	94
8	LMP2	15	(Mexico) Lowe's Fernández Racing	(Mexico) Adrian Fernández (Mexico) Luis Diaz	Acura AL7R 3.4L V8	MI	94
9	LMP2	26	(United States) Andretti Green Racing	(United States) Bryan Herta (United Kingdom) Marino Franchitti	Acura ARX-01a	MI	94
9	LMP2	26	(United States) Andretti Green Racing	(United States) Bryan Herta (United Kingdom) Marino Franchitti	Acura AL7R 3.4L V8	MI	94
10	LMP1	06	(United States) Team Cytosport	(United States) Greg Pickett (Germany) Klaus Graf	Lola B06/10	D	91
10	LMP1	06	(United States) Team Cytosport	(United States) Greg Pickett (Germany) Klaus Graf	AER P32T 3.6L Turbo V8	D	91
11	LMP2	8	(United States) B-K Motorsports (Japan) Mazdaspeed	(United States) Jamie Bach (United Kingdom) Ben Devlin	Lola B07/46	KU	91
11	LMP2	8	(United States) B-K Motorsports (Japan) Mazdaspeed	(United States) Jamie Bach (United Kingdom) Ben Devlin	Mazda MZR-R 2.0L Turbo I4	KU	91
12	**GT1**	**4**	**(United States) Corvette Racing**	**(United Kingdom) Oliver Gavin (Monaco) Olivier Beretta**	**Chevrolet Corvette C6.R**	MI	**91**
12	**GT1**	**4**	**(United States) Corvette Racing**	**(United Kingdom) Oliver Gavin (Monaco) Olivier Beretta**	**Chevrolet LS7-R 7.0L V8**	MI	**91**
13	GT1	3	(United States) Corvette Racing	(United States) Johnny O'Connell (Denmark) Jan Magnussen	Chevrolet Corvette C6.R	MI	90
13	GT1	3	(United States) Corvette Racing	(United States) Johnny O'Connell (Denmark) Jan Magnussen	Chevrolet LS7-R 7.0L V8	MI	90
14	GT1	27	(United States) Doran Racing	(Belgium) Didier Theys (Switzerland) Fredy Lienhard	Maserati MC12 GT1	MI	88
14	GT1	27	(United States) Doran Racing	(Belgium) Didier Theys (Switzerland) Fredy Lienhard	Maserati 6.0L V12	MI	88
15	**GT2**	**62**	**(United States) Risi Competizione**	**(Finland) Mika Salo (Brazil) Jaime Melo**	**Ferrari F430GT**	MI	**87**
15	**GT2**	**62**	**(United States) Risi Competizione**	**(Finland) Mika Salo (Brazil) Jaime Melo**	**Ferrari 4.0L V8**	MI	**87**
16	GT2	18	(United States) Rahal Letterman Racing	(United States) Tommy Milner (Germany) Ralf Kelleners	Porsche 997 GT3-RSR	MI	87
16	GT2	18	(United States) Rahal Letterman Racing	(United States) Tommy Milner (Germany) Ralf Kelleners	Porsche 3.8L Flat-6	MI	87
17	GT2	71	(United States) Tafel Racing	(Germany) Wolf Henzler (United Kingdom) Robin Liddell	Porsche 997 GT3-RSR	MI	87
17	GT2	71	(United States) Tafel Racing	(Germany) Wolf Henzler (United Kingdom) Robin Liddell	Porsche 3.8L Flat-6	MI	87
18^{†}	GT2	31	(United States) Petersen Motorsports (United States) White Lightning Racing	(United Kingdom) Peter Dumbreck (Germany) Dirk Müller	Ferrari F430GT	MI	87
18^{†}	GT2	31	(United States) Petersen Motorsports (United States) White Lightning Racing	(United Kingdom) Peter Dumbreck (Germany) Dirk Müller	Ferrari 4.0L V8	MI	87
19	GT2	45	(United States) Flying Lizard Motorsports	(United States) Johannes van Overbeek (Germany) Jörg Bergmeister	Porsche 997 GT3-RSR	MI	86
19	GT2	45	(United States) Flying Lizard Motorsports	(United States) Johannes van Overbeek (Germany) Jörg Bergmeister	Porsche 3.8L Flat-6	MI	86
20	GT2	61	(United States) Risi Competizione	(France) Éric Hélary (Italy) Gianmaria Bruni	Ferrari F430GT	MI	86
20	GT2	61	(United States) Risi Competizione	(France) Éric Hélary (Italy) Gianmaria Bruni	Ferrari 4.0L V8	MI	86
21	GT2	54	(United States) Team Trans Sport Racing	(United States) Tim Pappas (United States) Terry Borcheller	Porsche 997 GT3-RSR	Y	85
21	GT2	54	(United States) Team Trans Sport Racing	(United States) Tim Pappas (United States) Terry Borcheller	Porsche 3.8L Flat-6	Y	85
22	GT2	73	(United States) Tafel Racing	(United States) Jim Tafel (Germany) Dominik Farnbacher (United States) Nathan Swartzbaugh	Porsche 997 GT3-RSR	MI	83
22	GT2	73	(United States) Tafel Racing	(United States) Jim Tafel (Germany) Dominik Farnbacher (United States) Nathan Swartzbaugh	Porsche 3.8L Flat-6	MI	83
23	GT2	44	(United States) Flying Lizard Motorsports	(United States) Darren Law (United States) Seth Neiman	Porsche 997 GT3-RSR	MI	81
23	GT2	44	(United States) Flying Lizard Motorsports	(United States) Darren Law (United States) Seth Neiman	Porsche 3.8L Flat-6	MI	81
24 DNF	LMP1	12	(United States) Autocon Motorsports	(United States) Chris McMurry (United States) Brian Willman (United States) Michael Lewis	Creation CA06/H	D	76
24 DNF	LMP1	12	(United States) Autocon Motorsports	(United States) Chris McMurry (United States) Brian Willman (United States) Michael Lewis	Judd GV5 S2 5.0L V10	D	76
25 DNF	GT2	22	(United States) Panoz Team PTG	(United States) Bill Auberlen (United States) Joey Hand	Panoz Esperante GT-LM	Y	75
25 DNF	GT2	22	(United States) Panoz Team PTG	(United States) Bill Auberlen (United States) Joey Hand	Ford (Élan) 5.0L V8	Y	75
26 DNF	LMP1	37	(United States) Intersport Racing	(United States) Jon Field (United States) Clint Field (United States) Richard Berry	Creation CA06/H	KU	48
26 DNF	LMP1	37	(United States) Intersport Racing	(United States) Jon Field (United States) Clint Field (United States) Richard Berry	Judd GV5 S2 5.0L V10	KU	48

† - #31 Petersen/White Lightning was penalized after failing post-race technical inspection for improper tail lights. They were moved to the last car on their lap, dropping them one position.

== Statistics ==
- Pole Position - #1 Audi Sport North America - 1:47.665
- Fastest Lap - #1 Audi Sport North America - 1:49.303
- Margin of Victory - 1.783s
- Distance - 388.608 miles (625.404 km)
- Average Speed - 96.631 mph (155.513 km/h)

American Le Mans Series
Previous race: 2007 Sports Car Challenge of Mid-Ohio	2007 season	Next race: 2007 Grand Prix of Mosport
