= Jon Field =

American racing driver (born 1955)

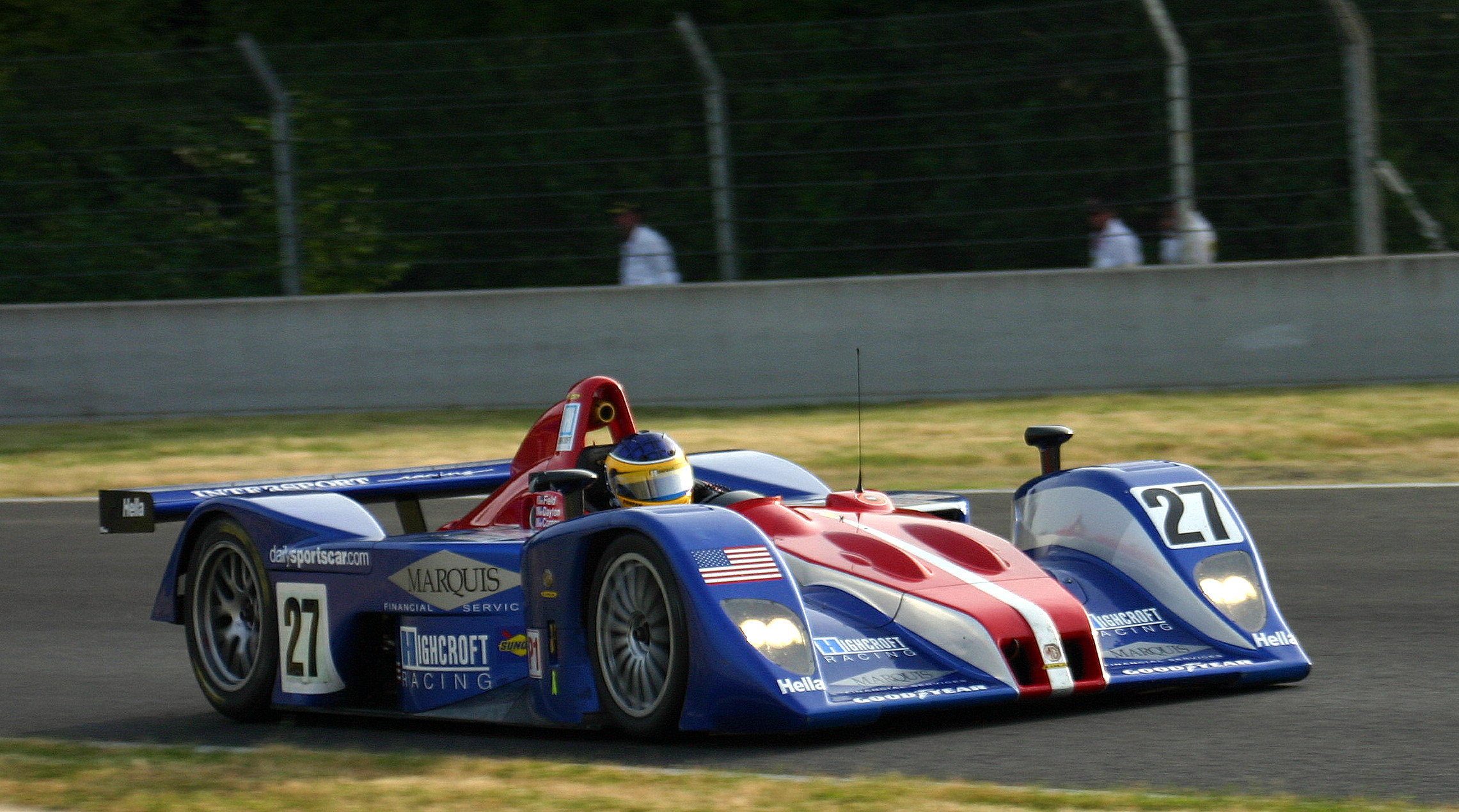
- Field in 2004
- Nationality: (United States) American
- Born: Jonathan Bricker Field; September 18, 1955 (age 71) Dublin, Ohio, U.S.
- Relatives: Clint Field (son)
- Categorisation: FIA Silver (until 2015); FIA Bronze (2016–)

Championship titles
- 2023, 2024 2002: Radical Cup North America – Platinum; American Le Mans Series – LMP675

Jonathan Bricker Field (born September 18, 1955) is an American racing driver and team owner who last competed in the LMP2 class of the IMSA SportsCar Championship for Intersport Racing, a team he founded in 1998. Field was American Le Mans Series champion in LMP675 in 2002, won the 12 Hours of Sebring twice in class, and raced in LMP1 until 2009. He returned to IMSA competition in 2025, at the age of 69.

== Personal life ==
Field is the twin brother of businessman and former racing driver Joel Field. Field's son, Clint, is also a former racing driver who most notably won the 2005 American Le Mans Series in the LMP2 class.

In 2006, Field pled guilty to embezzling $1.3 million from Colorado-based contractors and was sentenced to 12 years of probation, banned from traveling to the state without permission, and ordered to repay Denver Pavilions $2.5 million. In late 2014, Field was sentenced to five months in prison and three years of supervised release, along with his brother Joel (who served a year in prison) after pleading guilty to tax evasion charges.

== Career ==
Field began his racing career in 1993, competing in the Barber Saab Pro Series on a part-time basis for two seasons. In 1996, Field made his prototype debut in the IMSA GT Championship, a year in which he attempted to make a brief return to single-seaters, competing for Tempero–Giuffre Racing at the Indy Racing League's 1996 True Value 200, but withdrew after crashing before being approved to race. Another season in IMSA GT then ensued, before Field established Intersport Racing in 1998 and continued his ventures in sportscars with the team.

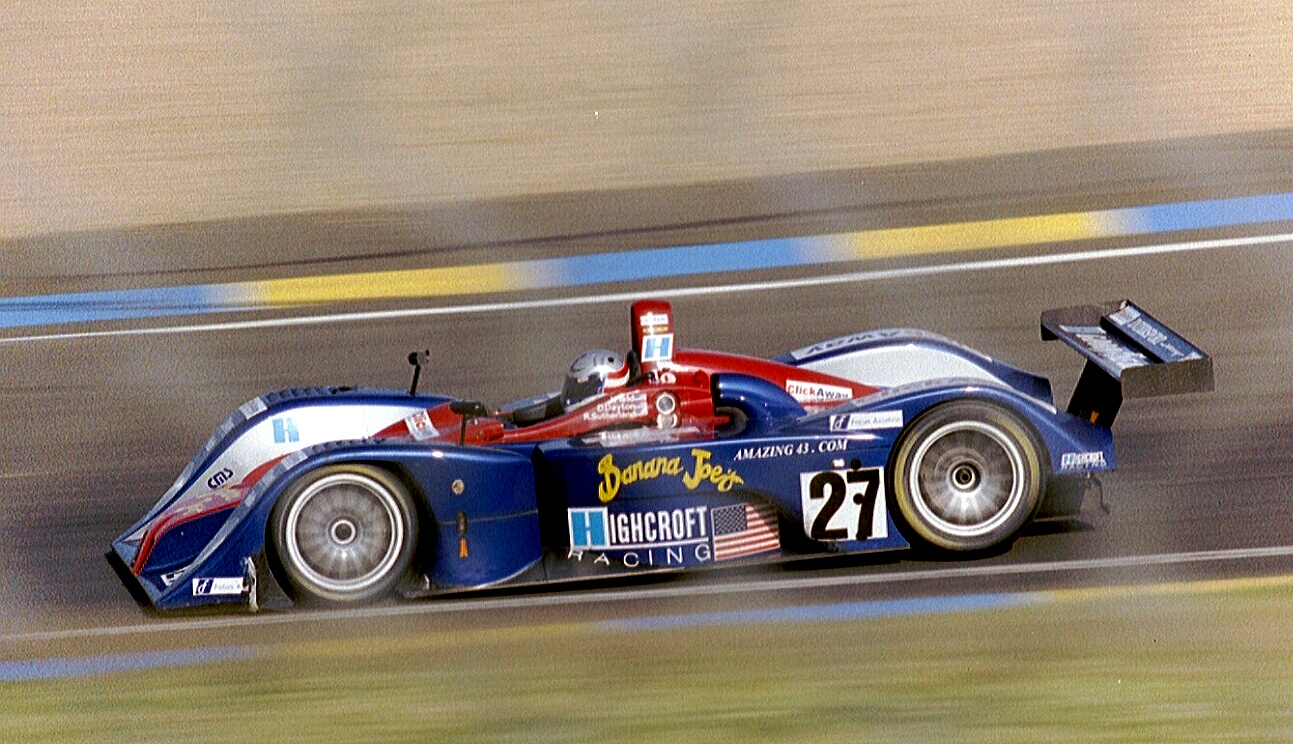
Field made his 24 Hours of Le Mans debut in 2003, fielding an Intersport Racing MG-Lola in LMP675.

After his maiden dual campaign between Grand-Am and the American Le Mans Series in 1999, Field scored his maiden overall career podium in the former the following year, doing so at the 6 Hours of Watkins Glen en route to a tenth-place points finish in the SR class. Continuing for another dual campaign in 2001, Field found more success in Grand-Am, taking wins at Phoenix and Mid-Ohio, as well as three other podiums to secure third in the SRP points. In 2002, Field only raced full-time in the LMP675 class of ALMS, winning the 12 Hours of Sebring, the Grand Prix of Washington D.C. and Petit Le Mans to secure the class title. During 2002, Field also raced part-time in Grand-Am, scoring podiums at Homestead–Miami and Phoenix before leaving the series mid-season.

Continuing in ALMS for 2003, Field won the Grand Prix of Atlanta, the Grand Prix de Trois-Rivières and Petit Le Mans to end the year runner-up in the LMP675 standings together with Duncan Dayton. During 2003, Field also made his debut at the 24 Hours of Le Mans and finished second at the 1000 km of Le Mans, both in LMP675. Continuing in the ALMS in the newly-established LMP1 class for 2004, Field took a lone podium at Road America en route to an eighth-place points finish. In the midst of his LMP1 campaign, Field raced twice in the LMP2 division, winning in both of his appearances at Sonoma and Portland alongside his son Clint and Robin Liddell. During 2004, Field also returned to the 24 Hours of Le Mans in LMP1 and made a one-off appearance in the Le Mans Endurance Series at Monza in LMP2.

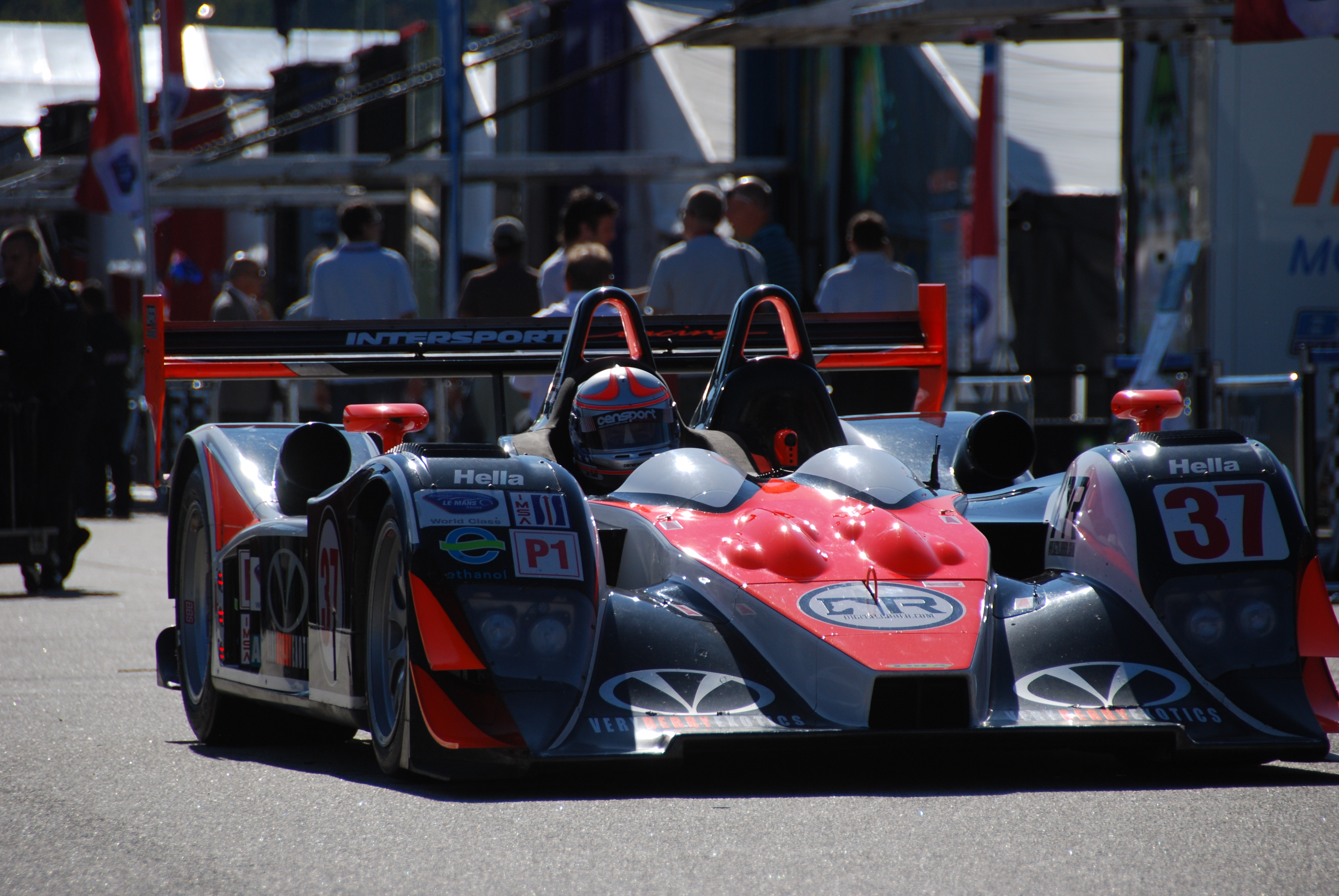
Field driving his Lola B06/10 LMP1 around the 2008 Petit Le Mans paddock.

Scaling back to a part-time schedule in LMP2 for 2005, Field won the Grand Prix of Atlanta and Petit Le Mans to take fifth in points. Another part-time campaign in 2006 followed, in which Field won the 12 Hours of Sebring with his son Clint and Liz Halliday, and finished third in his five remaining starts to end the year fifth in the LMP2 standings. Returning to full-time and LMP1 competition the following year, Field scored six consecutive podiums, with a best result of second at Lime Rock en route to a sixth-place points finish. In 2008, Field had a much more fruitful year, grabbing a class win at Detroit despite finishing 22nd overall after one Audi R10 TDI crashed and the other got disqualified, and taking six other podiums en route to runner-up honours in LMP1. Another strong season followed in 2009, in which Field took a best result of second at St. Petersburg and five other podiums to take third in the LMP1 standings alongside Clint. A lackluster season in 2010 then ensued, headlined by a testing crash at Sebring, before stepping back to a part-time campaign in the LMPC class in 2011, which yielded a lone podium at Mid-Ohio.

In 2020, Field returned to racing, competing in Radical Cup North America for Wisko Racing. Racing full-time in the series until 2025, Field won the Platinum title in 2023 and 2024 for One Motorsports, as well as finishing third in the 2022 Radical World Finals for the same team. In 2025, Field joined Inter Europol Competition to enter the 24 Hours of Daytona in LMP2, marking his return to IMSA competition after 15 years. Field then revived his Intersport Racing outfit for 2026, at the age of 70, launching a full-season effort with himself, Oliver Jarvis, and Seth Lucas for the enduros. Field raced for much of the season, taking a best result of seventh twice, to end the year 24th in LMP2 after skipping the final two sprint races of the season.

== Racing record ==
=== Racing career summary ===
Season	Series	Team	Races	Wins	Poles	F/Laps	Podiums	Points	Position
1993	Barber Saab Pro Series		3	0	0	0	0		
1994	Barber Saab Pro Series		3	0	0	0	0		26th
1996	IMSA GT Championship – WSC	Pegasus Racing	1	0	0	0	0	14	48th
1996	IMSA GT Championship – WSC	Fab Factory Motorsports	1	0	0	0	0	14	48th
1996	IMSA GT Championship – WSC	YPF	1	0	0	0	0	14	48th
1996–97	Indy Racing League	Tempero–Giuffre Racing	0	0	0	0	0	0	NC
1997	IMSA GT Championship – WSC	FAB Factory Motorsport	9	0	0	0	1	125	11th
1997	IMSA GT Championship – WSC	Courage Competition	2	0	0	0	0	125	11th
1998	United States Road Racing Championship – Can-Am	Intersport Racing	4	0	0	0	0		
1998	IMSA GT Championship – WSC	Intersport Racing	8	0	0	0	0	92	8th
1999	United States Road Racing Championship – Can-Am	Intersport Racing	4	0	0	0	0	95	10th
1999	American Le Mans Series – LMP	Intersport Racing	8	0	0	0	0	37	29th
2000	Grand American Road Racing Championship – SR	Intersport Racing	9	0	0	0	1	207	10th
2000	American Le Mans Series – LMP	Intersport Racing	7	0	0	0	0	80	18th
2001	Grand American Road Racing Championship – SRP	Intersport Racing	10	2	0	0	4	349	4th
2001	American Le Mans Series – LMP900	Intersport Racing	5	0	0	0	0	58	17th
2002	Rolex Sports Car Series – SRP	Intersport Racing	3	0	0	0	2	88	15th
2002	American Le Mans Series – LMP675	Intersport Racing	10	3	4	0	5	214	**1st**
2003	American Le Mans Series – LMP675	Intersport Racing	8	3	0	0	5	121	**2nd**
2003	24 Hours of Le Mans – LMP675	Intersport Racing	1	0	0	0	0	—N/a	DNF
2003	1000 km of Le Mans – LMP675	Intersport Racing	1	0	0	0	1	—N/a	**2nd**
2004	American Le Mans Series – LMP1	Intersport Racing	7	0	0	0	1	25	8th
2004	American Le Mans Series – LMP2	Intersport Racing	2	2	2	0	2	40	7th
2004	Le Mans Endurance Series – LMP2	Intersport Racing	1	0	0	0	0	0	NC
2004	24 Hours of Le Mans – LMP1	Intersport Racing	1	0	0	0	0	—N/a	DNF
2005	American Le Mans Series – LMP2	Intersport Racing	5	1	4	0	3	73	5th
2006	American Le Mans Series – LMP2	Intersport Racing	4	1	0	0	3	71	5th
2007	American Le Mans Series – LMP1	Intersport Racing	12	0	0	0	6	82	6th
2008	American Le Mans Series – LMP1	Intersport Racing	11	1	0	0	6	116	**3rd**
2009	American Le Mans Series – LMP1	Intersport Racing	10	0	0	0	6	116	**3rd**
2010	American Le Mans Series – LMP	Intersport Racing	7	0	0	0	1	59	11th
2011	American Le Mans Series – LMPC	Intersport Racing	4	0	0	0	1	41	11th
2020	Radical Cup North America – Masters	Wisko Racing							
2021	Radical Cup North America – Platinum	Scott Wagner Racing							
2022	Radical Cup North America – Platinum	ONE Motorsport							
2022	Radical World Finals – Platinum	ONE Motorsport	4	0	0	0	4	—N/a	**3rd**
2023	Radical Cup North America – Platinum	One Motorsports	18	13	6	0	15		**1st**
2023	Radical World Finals – Platinum	One Motorsports	4	0	0	0	0	—N/a	4th
2024	Radical Cup North America – Platinum	One Motorsports	18	9	7	0	13		**1st**
2024	HSR Prototype Challenge – Pro-Am	One Motorsports						24	4th
2025	IMSA SportsCar Championship – LMP2	Inter Europol Competition	1	0	0	0	0	231	56th
2025	Radical Cup North America – Platinum	One Motorsports	9	6	0	0	6		
2026	IMSA SportsCar Championship – LMP2	Intersport Racing	5	0	0	0	0	1182	24th

* Season still in progress.

^{†} As Field was a guest driver, he was ineligible for points.

=== American open-wheel racing results ===
==== IndyCar Series ====
Year	Team	Chassis	No.	Engine	1	2	3	4	5	6	7	8	9	10	Rank	Points
1996–97	Tempero–Giuffre Racing	Lola T91/00	25	Buick V6	NHM; Wth	LVS	WDW	PHX	INDY	TXS	PPIR	CLT	NH2	LV2	NC	0

=== Complete American Le Mans Series results ===
(key) (Races in bold indicate pole position; results in italics indicate fastest lap)

Year	Team	Class	Make	Engine	1	2	3	4	5	6	7	8	9	10	11	12	Pos.	Points
1999	Intersport Racing	LMP	Lola B98/10	Ford (Roush) 6.0 L V8	SEB; 11	ATL; 17	MOS; 12	SON; 19	POR; 13	PET; 17	LGA; 12	LVS; 13					29th	37
2000	Intersport Racing	LMP	Lola B98/10	Ford 5.1 L V8	SEB; 8	CHA	SIL	NÜR									18th	80
2000	Intersport Racing	LMP	Lola B2K/10	Judd GV4 4.0 L V10					SON; 6	MOS	TEX; 8	ROS; 9	PET; 11	MON; 6	LSV; 8	ADE	18th	80
2001	Intersport Racing	LMP900	Lola B2K/10	Judd GV4 4.0 L V10	TEX	SEB; 5	DON	JAR	SON; 6	POR; DNA	MOS						17th	58
2001	Intersport Racing	LMP900	Lola B2K/10B	Judd GV4 4.0 L V10								MID; 9	MON; 7	PET; DSQ			17th	58
2002	Intersport Racing	LMP675	MG-Lola EX257	MG (AER) XP20 2.0 L Turbo I4	SEB; 1	SON; 3	MDO; 4	ELK; 5	WAS; 1	TRO; 4	MOS; 6	LGA; 3	MIA; 5	PET; 1			1st	214
2003	Intersport Racing	LMP675	MG-Lola EX257	MG (AER) XP20 2.0 L Turbo I4	SEB; 2	ATL; 1	SON; DNS	TRO; 1	MOS; Ret	ELK; 4	LGA; 3	MIA; 4					2nd	121
2003	Intersport Racing	LMP675	Lola B01/60	Judd KV675 3.4 L V8									PET; 1				2nd	121
2004	Intersport Racing	LMP1	Lola B01/60	Judd KV675 3.4 L V8	SEB; 8	MDO; NC	LRP; Ret	SON; DNS	POR; DNP	MOS; Ret	ELK; 2	PET; Ret	LGA; Ret				8th	25
2004	Intersport Racing	LMP2	Lola B2K/40	Judd KV675 3.4 L V8				**SON**; 1	**POR**; 1								7th	40
2005	Intersport Racing	LMP2	Lola B05/40	AER P07 2.0 L Turbo I4	**SEB**; Ret	**ATL**; 1	**MDO**; 2	LRP	SON	POR	ELK	MOS	**PET**; 1	LGA; 5			5th	73
2006	Intersport Racing	LMP2	Lola B05/40	AER P07 2.0 L Turbo I4	SEB; 1	TEX	MDO; 3	LRP	UTA	POR	ELK; 3	MOS; 3	PET; 3	LGA; 3			5th	84
2007	Intersport Racing	LMP1	Creation CA06/H	Judd GV5 S2 5.0 L V10	SEB; 3	STP; 3	LBH; 3	TEX; 3	UTA; 3	LRP; 2	MDO; 5	ELK; 5	MOS; 4				6th	82
2007	Intersport Racing	LMP1	Lola B06/10	AER P32T 4.0 L Turbo V8										DET; 4	PET; 7	LGA; 7	6th	82
2008	Intersport Racing	LMP1	Lola B06/10	AER P32C 4.0 L Turbo V8 (E85 ethanol)	SEB; 3	STP; 3	LBH; 4	UTA; 2	LRP; 2	MDO; WD	ELK; 3	MOS; 3	DET; 1	PET; 6	LGA; 5		2nd	116
2009	Intersport Racing	LMP1	Lola B06/10	AER P32C 4.0 L Turbo V8	SEB; 8	STP; 2	LBH; 3	UTA; 3	LRP; 5	MDO; 3	ELK; 3	MOS; 3	PET; 7	LGA; 5			3rd	116
2010	Intersport Racing	LMP	Lola B06/10	AER P32T 4.0 L Turbo V8	SEB; DNS	LBH; 7	LGA; WD	UTA; 7	LRP; 9	MDO; 4	ELK; 6	MOS; 6	PET; 4				11th	59
2011	Intersport Racing	LMPC	Oreca FLM09	Chevrolet LS3 6.2 L V8	SEB	LBH	LRP; 6	MOS; 4	MDO; 2	ELK; 4	BAL	LGA	PET; WD				11th	41

^{†} Did not finish the race but was classified as his car completed more than 70% of the overall winner's race distance.

=== Complete Grand-Am Rolex Sports Car Series results ===
(key) (Races in bold indicate pole position; results in italics indicate fastest lap)

Year	Team	Class	Make	Engine	1	2	3	4	5	6	7	8	9	10	11	Rank	Points
2000	Intersport Racing	SR	Lola B98/10	Ford 5.1 L V8	DAY; 15	PHX; 7	MIA; 6	LIM; 6	MOH; 6	DAY; 5	ELK; 5	TRO; 7	WGL; 2			10th	207
2001	Intersport Racing	SRP	Lola B2K/10	Judd GV4 4.0 L V10	DAY; 4	MIA; 2	PHX; 1	WGL; 5	LIM; 4	LIM; 7	MOH; 1	ELK; 3	TRO; 6	WGL; 3	DAY; 8	4th	349
2002	Intersport Racing	SRP	Lola B2K/10	Judd GV4 4.0 L V10	DAY; 5	MIA; 2	CAL; DNA	PHX; 3	WGL; DNA	DAY; DNA	WGL; DNA	VIR	MTT	DAY		15th	88

=== Complete 24 Hours of Le Mans results ===
Year	Team	Co-Drivers	Car	Class	Laps	Pos.	Class Pos.
2003	(United States) Intersport Racing	(United States) Duncan Dayton (United States) Rick Sutherland	MG-Lola EX257	LMP675	107	DNF	DNF
2004	(United States) Intersport Racing	(United States) Duncan Dayton (United States) Larry Connor	Lola B01/60	LMP1	29	DNF	DNF

=== Complete Le Mans Endurance Series results ===
(key) (Races in bold indicate pole position; results in italics indicate fastest lap)

Year	Entrant	Class	Chassis	Engine	1	2	3	4	Rank	Points
2004	Intersport Racing	LMP2	Lola B2K/40	Judd KV675 3.4 L V8	MNZ; Ret	NUR	SIL	SPA	NC	0

=== Complete IMSA SportsCar Championship results ===
Year	Entrant	Class	Chassis	Engine	1	2	3	4	5	6	7	Rank	Points
2025	Inter Europol Competition	LMP2	Oreca 07	Gibson GK428 4.2 L V8	DAY; 10	SEB	WGL	MOS	ELK	IMS	PET	56th	231
2026	Intersport Racing	LMP2	Oreca 07	Gibson GK428 4.2 L V8	DAY; 7	SEB; 10	WGL; 11	MOS	ELK; 12	IMS	PET; 7	24th	1182

^{*} Season still in progress.
