= 2006 American Le Mans Series =

36th season of the racing series organized by IMSA

Seasons
- ← 2005 2007 →

The 2006 American Le Mans Series season was the 36th season for the IMSA GT Championship, with the eighth as the American Le Mans Series. It was a series for Le Mans Prototypes (LMP) and Grand Touring (GT) race cars divided into 4 classes: LMP1, LMP2, GT1, and GT2. It began March 18, 2006, and ended October 21, 2006 after 10 races.

== Pre-season ==
Among the biggest announcements prior to the start of the 2006 season was that Audi would continue their involvement in the ALMS with their new R10 TDI diesel engined LMP1 with the car making its international racing debut at the 12 Hours of Sebring in preparation for Le Mans. Audi followed up this announcement with plans for a single Audi R8 to go on a farewell tour for the first few races after Sebring, and then be replaced by two new R10 TDI after Le Mans for the rest of the ALMS season.

Fellow LMP1 competitors Dyson Racing also announced an upgrade from their troublesome Lola EX257s to brand new B06/10s with the new AER Turbo V8 engine unit. As part of their purchase, Dyson in turn sold off their EX257s. Occasional ALMS entrant Autocon Motorsports bought one chassis, while former Intersport partner Highcroft Racing bought the other, leading to an enlarged LMP1 field for 2006.

In LMP2 the teams of Miracle Motorsports, B-K Motorsports, Intersport Racing, and Penske Racing all planned to make a return to the series. Penske's initial one-car effort towards the end of 2005 was expanded to two cars for 2006, while the four other teams kept their efforts the same.

In GT1, the field appeared to be shrinking. Corvette Racing's commitment was certain, but Aston Martin Racing, now running Pirelli tyres instead of Michelin, was only able to promise Sebring in the beginning, later stating they'd also run Houston and Mid-Ohio in preparation for Le Mans. Their involvement for the rest of the season was left as merely a rumor. ACEMCO Motorsports's future in ALMS was also uncertain, with the team scrounging for cash to be able to continue racing. Former GT1 team Carsport America finally folded following the 2005 season, with their Dodge Viper GTS-R greatly outdated. The involvement of Maserati in the series was also pulled due to the cancelling of the project by the corporate heads since it never reached its initial plans, and the continued restrictions put in place by IMSA.

The GT2 class was also more of the same, with returning favorites Flying Lizard Motorsports, J3 Racing, Petersen/White Lightning, Panoz Motorsports, and Alex Job, although Alex Job's effort was now brought down to a single entry due to his expanded involvement in Grand-Am. Risi Competizione, who had run the Maserati in 2005, promised to return to GT2 with Ferrari's upcoming replacement to the Ferrari 360, the new F430.

The ALMS also created a new class of competitors, known as GT2S, designed to allow racing cars based on production vehicles which had seats for four in a coupe or sedan body style. Cars of this type were now allowed by ACO rules, but IMSA agreed that these cars would not be eligible for Le Mans entry even if they won Petit Le Mans or the season championship. These cars however would be competitively equal to the GT2 class and would compete accordingly with them. The long time BMW factory supported effort of Team PTG announced their return of the BMW M3 to the series, while Lexus announced their intentions to bring a new purpose built racing car built off of the IS. Rumors also speculated that Cadillac could bring their CTS-V SpeedGT program to the series. However, come the beginning of the season, neither Lexus nor Cadillac showed, leaving the BMW M3 as the only true GT2S competitor. The GT2S notion was shelved midseason.

From the standpoint of the 2006 schedule, two major changes were made. First, to replace the earlier round at Road Atlanta held soon after Sebring, a new temporary street circuit near Houston's Reliant Park was announced in cooperation with Champ Car. The round at Infineon Raceway was replaced with Miller Motorsports Park, a new racing facility near Salt Lake City.

== Schedule ==
| Rnd | Race | Length | Circuit | Location | Date |
|---|---|---|---|---|---|
| 1 | (United States) 54th Mobil 1 12 Hours of Sebring | 12 Hours | Sebring International Raceway | Sebring, Florida | March 18 |
| 2 | (United States) Lone Star Grand Prix | 2 Hours 45 Minutes | Reliant Park | Houston, Texas | May 12 |
| 3 | (United States) American Le Mans at Mid-Ohio | 2 Hours 45 Minutes | Mid-Ohio | Lexington, Ohio | May 21 |
| 4 | (United States) New England Grand Prix | 2 Hours 45 Minutes | Lime Rock Park | Lakeville, Connecticut | July 1 |
| 5 | (United States) Utah Grand Prix | 2 Hours 45 Minutes | Miller Motorsports Park | Grantsville, Utah | July 15 |
| 6 | (United States) Portland Grand Prix | 2 Hours 45 Minutes | Portland International Raceway | Portland, Oregon | July 22 |
| 7 | (United States) Generac 500 at Road America | 2 Hours 45 Minutes | Road America | Elkhart Lake, Wisconsin | August 20 |
| 8 | (Canada) Grand Prix of Mosport | 2 Hours 45 Minutes | Mosport | Bowmanville, Ontario | September 3 |
| 9 | (United States) Petit Le Mans powered by Mazda CX-7 | 1000 Miles or 10 Hours | Road Atlanta | Braselton, Georgia | September 30 |
| 10 | (United States) Monterey Sports Car Championships | 4 Hours | Mazda Raceway Laguna Seca | Monterey, California | October 21 |

For 2006 the series planned to expand to new markets. The Grand Prix of Utah would be held at the brand new Miller Motorsports Park, 25 minutes away from Salt Lake City. At 4.5 miles, it became the longest circuit on the ALMS calendar.

The series returned to Texas for the first time since 2001, with a 1.7 mile street circuit at Reliant Park in Houston. This would be a joint event with Champ car, similar to the deal the ALMS had with CART for the Grand Prix of Miami in 2002 and 2003.

Sonoma was dropped from the calendar as the series saw no benefits to having races at both Laguna Seca and Sonoma as they are both in Northern California. The Grand Prix of Atlanta was dropped as the series didn't want two events on the same circuit.

There had also been plans to add the Long Beach Street Circuit to the calendar, but this failed to materialize.

== Entry list ==
=== Le Mans Prototype 1 (LMP1) ===
| Team | Chassis | Engine | Tyre | No. | Drivers | Rnds. |
|---|---|---|---|---|---|---|
| (United States) Audi Sport North America | Audi R10 TDI | Audi TDI 5.5L Turbo V12 (Diesel) | M | 1 | (Germany) Frank Biela | 1, 5–10 |
| (United States) Audi Sport North America | Audi R10 TDI | Audi TDI 5.5L Turbo V12 (Diesel) | M | 1 | (Italy) Emanuele Pirro | 1, 5–10 |
| (United States) Audi Sport North America | Audi R10 TDI | Audi TDI 5.5L Turbo V12 (Diesel) | M | 1 | (Germany) Marco Werner | 1, 9 |
| (United States) Audi Sport North America | Audi R10 TDI(1, 5-10) Audi R8(2-4) | Audi TDI 5.5L Turbo V12 (Diesel)(1, 5-10) Audi 3.6 L Turbo V8(2-4) | M | 2 | (Italy) Rinaldo Capello | All |
| (United States) Audi Sport North America | Audi R10 TDI(1, 5-10) Audi R8(2-4) | Audi TDI 5.5L Turbo V12 (Diesel)(1, 5-10) Audi 3.6 L Turbo V8(2-4) | M | 2 | (United Kingdom) Allan McNish | All |
| (United States) Audi Sport North America | Audi R10 TDI(1, 5-10) Audi R8(2-4) | Audi TDI 5.5L Turbo V12 (Diesel)(1, 5-10) Audi 3.6 L Turbo V8(2-4) | M | 2 | (Denmark) Tom Kristensen | 1 |
| (United States) Highcroft Racing | MG-Lola EX257 | AER P07 2.0L Turbo I4 | D | 9 | (United States) Duncan Dayton | 1, 4–7, 9 |
| (United States) Highcroft Racing | MG-Lola EX257 | AER P07 2.0L Turbo I4 | D | 9 | (United Kingdom) Gregor Fisken | 1 |
| (United States) Highcroft Racing | MG-Lola EX257 | AER P07 2.0L Turbo I4 | D | 9 | (United States) Richard Knoop | 1 |
| (United States) Highcroft Racing | MG-Lola EX257 | AER P07 2.0L Turbo I4 | D | 9 | (United Kingdom) Andy Wallace | 4–7 |
| (United States) Highcroft Racing | MG-Lola EX257 | AER P07 2.0L Turbo I4 | D | 9 | (United States) Memo Gidley | 9 |
| (United States) Highcroft Racing | MG-Lola EX257 | AER P07 2.0L Turbo I4 | D | 9 | (Brazil) Vítor Meira | 9 |
| (United States) Autocon Motorsports | MG-Lola EX257 | AER P07 2.0L Turbo I4 | D | 12 | (United States) Chris McMurry | 1–9 |
| (United States) Autocon Motorsports | MG-Lola EX257 | AER P07 2.0L Turbo I4 | D | 12 | (United States) Bryan Willman | 1–2, 6, 9–10 |
| (United States) Autocon Motorsports | MG-Lola EX257 | AER P07 2.0L Turbo I4 | D | 12 | (United States) Michael Lewis | 1, 3–5, 7–10 |
| (United States) Autocon Motorsports | MG-Lola EX257 | AER P07 2.0L Turbo I4 | D | 12 | (United States) John Graham | 8, 10 |
| (United Kingdom) Zytek Engineering | Zytek 06S | Zytek 2ZG408 4.0L V8 | M | 15 | (Sweden) Stefan Johansson | 9–10 |
| (United Kingdom) Zytek Engineering | Zytek 06S | Zytek 2ZG408 4.0L V8 | M | 15 | (United Kingdom) Johnny Mowlem | 9–10 |
| (United Kingdom) Zytek Engineering | Zytek 06S | Zytek 2ZG408 4.0L V8 | M | 15 | (Japan) Haruki Kurosawa | 9 |
| (United States) Dyson Racing Team | Lola B06/10 | AER P32T 3.6L Turbo V8 | M | 16 | (United Kingdom) James Weaver | All |
| (United States) Dyson Racing Team | Lola B06/10 | AER P32T 3.6L Turbo V8 | M | 16 | (United States) Butch Leitzinger | 1–9 |
| (United States) Dyson Racing Team | Lola B06/10 | AER P32T 3.6L Turbo V8 | M | 16 | (United Kingdom) Andy Wallace | 1, 9 |
| (United States) Dyson Racing Team | Lola B06/10 | AER P32T 3.6L Turbo V8 | M | 16 | (United States) Chris Dyson | 10 |
| (United States) Dyson Racing Team | Lola B06/10 | AER P32T 3.6L Turbo V8 | M | 20 | (United Kingdom) Guy Smith | 1–9 |
| (United States) Dyson Racing Team | Lola B06/10 | AER P32T 3.6L Turbo V8 | M | 20 | (United States) Chris Dyson | 1–9 |
| (United States) Group Bio | Lola B2K/10 | GBL Hybrid Turbo Diesel | ? | 32 | (Finland) Harri Toivonen | 1* |
| (United States) Group Bio | Lola B2K/10 | GBL Hybrid Turbo Diesel | ? | 32 | (United Kingdom) Adam Sharpe | 1* |
| (United Kingdom) Creation Autosportif | Creation CA06/H | Judd GV5 S2 5.0L V10 | M | 88 | (France) Nicolas Minassian | 9–10 |
| (United Kingdom) Creation Autosportif | Creation CA06/H | Judd GV5 S2 5.0L V10 | M | 88 | (Switzerland) Harold Primat | 9–10 |
| (United Kingdom) Creation Autosportif | Creation CA06/H | Judd GV5 S2 5.0L V10 | M | 88 | (United Kingdom) Jamie Campbell-Walter | 9 |

=== Le Mans Prototype 2 (LMP2) ===
| Team | Chassis | Engine | Tyre | No. | Drivers | Rnds. |
|---|---|---|---|---|---|---|
| (United States) Penske Racing | Porsche RS Spyder | Porsche MR6 3.4L V8 | M | 6 | (Germany) Sascha Maassen | All |
| (United States) Penske Racing | Porsche RS Spyder | Porsche MR6 3.4L V8 | M | 6 | (Germany) Lucas Luhr | 1–6 |
| (United States) Penske Racing | Porsche RS Spyder | Porsche MR6 3.4L V8 | M | 6 | (France) Emmanuel Collard | 1, 9–10 |
| (United States) Penske Racing | Porsche RS Spyder | Porsche MR6 3.4L V8 | M | 6 | (Germany) Timo Bernhard | 7–9 |
| (United States) Penske Racing | Porsche RS Spyder | Porsche MR6 3.4L V8 | M | 7 | (France) Romain Dumas | All |
| (United States) Penske Racing | Porsche RS Spyder | Porsche MR6 3.4L V8 | M | 7 | (Germany) Timo Bernhard | 1–6 |
| (United States) Penske Racing | Porsche RS Spyder | Porsche MR6 3.4L V8 | M | 7 | (United States) Patrick Long | 1 |
| (United States) Penske Racing | Porsche RS Spyder | Porsche MR6 3.4L V8 | M | 7 | (Germany) Lucas Luhr | 7–10 |
| (United States) Penske Racing | Porsche RS Spyder | Porsche MR6 3.4L V8 | M | 7 | (Germany) Mike Rockenfeller | 9 |
| (United States) B-K Motorsports | Courage C65 | Mazda R20B 2.0L 3-Rotor | G K | 8 | (United States) Guy Cosmo | 1–4, 9–10 |
| (United States) B-K Motorsports | Courage C65 | Mazda R20B 2.0L 3-Rotor | G K | 8 | (United States) James Bach | 1–4, 9–10 |
| (United States) B-K Motorsports | Courage C65 | Mazda R20B 2.0L 3-Rotor | G K | 8 | (Brazil) Raphael Matos | 1 |
| (United States) B-K Motorsports | Courage C65 | Mazda R20B 2.0L 3-Rotor | G K | 8 | (United States) Elliot Forbes-Robinson | 9 |
| (United States) Miracle Motorsports | Courage C65 | AER P07 2.0L Turbo I4 | K | 10 | (United States) Andy Lally | 1 |
| (United States) Miracle Motorsports | Courage C65 | AER P07 2.0L Turbo I4 | K | 10 | (United States) James Gue | 1 |
| (France) Rachel Welter | WR LMP04 | Peugeot 2.0L Turbo I4 | ? | 18 | (France) Frédéric Hauchard | 1* |
| (France) Rachel Welter | WR LMP04 | Peugeot 2.0L Turbo I4 | ? | 18 | (France) Olivier Porta | 1* |
| (United States) Van der Steur Racing | Lola B2K/40(2-4) Radical SR9(9-10) | Nissan (AER) VQL 3.0L V6(2-4) AER P07 2.0L Turbo I4(9-10) | D K | 19 | (United Kingdom) Ben Devlin | 2–4, 9–10 |
| (United States) Van der Steur Racing | Lola B2K/40(2-4) Radical SR9(9-10) | Nissan (AER) VQL 3.0L V6(2-4) AER P07 2.0L Turbo I4(9-10) | D K | 19 | (United States) Gunnar van der Steur | 2–4, 9–10 |
| (United States) Van der Steur Racing | Lola B2K/40(2-4) Radical SR9(9-10) | Nissan (AER) VQL 3.0L V6(2-4) AER P07 2.0L Turbo I4(9-10) | D K | 19 | (United Kingdom) Tim Greaves | 9 |
| (United States) Van der Steur Racing | Lola B2K/40(2-4) Radical SR9(9-10) | Nissan (AER) VQL 3.0L V6(2-4) AER P07 2.0L Turbo I4(9-10) | D K | 19 | (United States) Adam Pecorari | 10 |
| (Switzerland) Horag Racing | Lola B05/40 | Judd XV675 3.4L V8 | M | 27 | (Switzerland) Fredy Lienhard | 9–10 |
| (Switzerland) Horag Racing | Lola B05/40 | Judd XV675 3.4L V8 | M | 27 | (Belgium) Didier Theys | 9–10 |
| (Switzerland) Horag Racing | Lola B05/40 | Judd XV675 3.4L V8 | M | 27 | (Belgium) Eric van de Poele | 9 |
| (France) Barazi-Epsilon | Courage C65 | AER P07 2.0L Turbo I4 | M | 33 | (Netherlands) Michael Vergers | 1 |
| (France) Barazi-Epsilon | Courage C65 | AER P07 2.0L Turbo I4 | M | 33 | (Denmark) Juan Barazi | 1 |
| (France) Barazi-Epsilon | Courage C65 | AER P07 2.0L Turbo I4 | M | 33 | (United States) Elton Julian | 1 |
| (United States) Intersport Racing | Lola B05/40 | AER P07 2.0 L Turbo I4 | G | 37 | (United States) Clint Field | All |
| (United States) Intersport Racing | Lola B05/40 | AER P07 2.0 L Turbo I4 | G | 37 | (United States) Liz Halliday | All |
| (United States) Intersport Racing | Lola B05/40 | AER P07 2.0 L Turbo I4 | G | 37 | (United States) Jon Field | 1, 7, 9–10 |
| (United States) Binnie Motorsports | Lola B05/42 | Zytek ZG348 3.4L V8 | M | 41 | (United Kingdom) William Binnie | 1 |
| (United States) Binnie Motorsports | Lola B05/42 | Zytek ZG348 3.4L V8 | M | 41 | (United Kingdom) Allen Timpany | 1 |
| (United States) Binnie Motorsports | Lola B05/42 | Zytek ZG348 3.4L V8 | M | 41 | (United States) Rick Sutherland | 1 |
| (United Kingdom) Team Bruichladdich Radical | Radical SR9 | AER P07 2.0L Turbo I4 | D | 76 | (United Kingdom) Stuart Moseley | 10 |
| (United Kingdom) Team Bruichladdich Radical | Radical SR9 | AER P07 2.0L Turbo I4 | D | 76 | (Netherlands) Michael Vergers | 10 |

=== Grand Touring 1 (GT1) ===
| Team | Chassis | Engine | Tyre | No. | Drivers | Rnds. |
|---|---|---|---|---|---|---|
| (United Kingdom) Aston Martin Racing | Aston Martin DBR9 | Aston Martin 6.0 L V12 | P | 007 | (Czech Republic) Tomáš Enge | All |
| (United Kingdom) Aston Martin Racing | Aston Martin DBR9 | Aston Martin 6.0 L V12 | P | 007 | (United Kingdom) Darren Turner | 1–7, 9–10 |
| (United Kingdom) Aston Martin Racing | Aston Martin DBR9 | Aston Martin 6.0 L V12 | P | 007 | (Denmark) Nicolas Kiesa | 1 |
| (United Kingdom) Aston Martin Racing | Aston Martin DBR9 | Aston Martin 6.0 L V12 | P | 007 | (Netherlands) Peter Kox | 8 |
| (United Kingdom) Aston Martin Racing | Aston Martin DBR9 | Aston Martin 6.0 L V12 | P | 009 | (France) Stephane Sarrazin | All |
| (United Kingdom) Aston Martin Racing | Aston Martin DBR9 | Aston Martin 6.0 L V12 | P | 009 | (Portugal) Pedro Lamy | 1–4, 6–10 |
| (United Kingdom) Aston Martin Racing | Aston Martin DBR9 | Aston Martin 6.0 L V12 | P | 009 | (Australia) Jason Bright | 1 |
| (United Kingdom) Aston Martin Racing | Aston Martin DBR9 | Aston Martin 6.0 L V12 | P | 009 | (Italy) Andrea Piccini | 5 |
| (United States) Corvette Racing | Chevrolet Corvette C6.R | Chevrolet LS7.r 7.0L V8 | M | 3 | (Canada) Ron Fellows | All |
| (United States) Corvette Racing | Chevrolet Corvette C6.R | Chevrolet LS7.r 7.0L V8 | M | 3 | (United States) Johnny O'Connell | All |
| (United States) Corvette Racing | Chevrolet Corvette C6.R | Chevrolet LS7.r 7.0L V8 | M | 3 | (Italy) Max Papis | 1, 9 |
| (United States) Corvette Racing | Chevrolet Corvette C6.R | Chevrolet LS7.r 7.0L V8 | M | 4 | (United Kingdom) Oliver Gavin | All |
| (United States) Corvette Racing | Chevrolet Corvette C6.R | Chevrolet LS7.r 7.0L V8 | M | 4 | (Monaco) Olivier Beretta | All |
| (United States) Corvette Racing | Chevrolet Corvette C6.R | Chevrolet LS7.r 7.0L V8 | M | 4 | (Denmark) Jan Magnussen | 1, 9 |
| (Germany) Konrad Motorsports | Saleen S7-R | Ford 7.0L V8 | P | 25 | (France) Jean-Philippe Belloc | 1 |
| (Germany) Konrad Motorsports | Saleen S7-R | Ford 7.0L V8 | P | 25 | (United States) Tom Weickardt | 1 |
| (Germany) Konrad Motorsports | Saleen S7-R | Ford 7.0L V8 | P | 25 | (United States) Terry Borcheller | 1 |
| (Germany) Konrad Motorsports | Saleen S7-R | Ford 7.0L V8 | P | 26 | (Italy) Paolo Ruberti | 1–2 |
| (Germany) Konrad Motorsports | Saleen S7-R | Ford 7.0L V8 | P | 26 | (Italy) Fabio Babini | 1 |
| (Germany) Konrad Motorsports | Saleen S7-R | Ford 7.0L V8 | P | 26 | (United Kingdom) Jamie Davies | 1 |
| (Germany) Konrad Motorsports | Saleen S7-R | Ford 7.0L V8 | P | 26 | (United States) Tom Weickardt | 2 |
| (Germany) Konrad Motorsports | Saleen S7-R | Ford 7.0L V8 | P | 26 | (Austria) Franz Konrad | 2 |

=== Grand Touring 2 (GT2) ===
| Team | Chassis | Engine | Tyre | No. | Drivers | Rnds. |
|---|---|---|---|---|---|---|
| (United States) BMW Team PTG | BMW M3 GTR | BMW 3.2L I6 | Y | 21 | (United States) Bill Auberlen | All |
| (United States) BMW Team PTG | BMW M3 GTR | BMW 3.2L I6 | Y | 21 | (United States) Joey Hand | All |
| (United States) BMW Team PTG | BMW M3 GTR | BMW 3.2L I6 | Y | 21 | (United Kingdom) Ian James | 1 |
| (United States) BMW Team PTG | BMW M3 GTR | BMW 3.2L I6 | Y | 21 | (United States) Boris Said | 9 |
| (United States) BMW Team PTG | BMW M3 GTR | BMW 3.2L I6 | Y | 22 | (United States) Justin Marks | All |
| (United States) BMW Team PTG | BMW M3 GTR | BMW 3.2L I6 | Y | 22 | (Germany) Martin Jensen | 1–2 |
| (United States) BMW Team PTG | BMW M3 GTR | BMW 3.2L I6 | Y | 22 | (United States) Bryan Sellers | 1, 3–10 |
| (United States) BMW Team PTG | BMW M3 GTR | BMW 3.2L I6 | Y | 22 | (United Kingdom) Ian James | 9 |
| (United States) Alex Job Racing | Porsche 996 GT3-RSR | Porsche 3.6 L Flat-6 | M | 23 | (Germany) Mike Rockenfeller | 1–8, 10 |
| (United States) Alex Job Racing | Porsche 996 GT3-RSR | Porsche 3.6 L Flat-6 | M | 23 | (Germany) Klaus Graf | 1–5 |
| (United States) Alex Job Racing | Porsche 996 GT3-RSR | Porsche 3.6 L Flat-6 | M | 23 | (United States) Graham Rahal | 1 |
| (United States) Alex Job Racing | Porsche 996 GT3-RSR | Porsche 3.6 L Flat-6 | M | 23 | (United Kingdom) Robin Liddell | 6, 9 |
| (United States) Alex Job Racing | Porsche 996 GT3-RSR | Porsche 3.6 L Flat-6 | M | 23 | (Germany) Marcel Tiemann | 7–10 |
| (United States) Alex Job Racing | Porsche 996 GT3-RSR | Porsche 3.6 L Flat-6 | M | 23 | (Germany) Dominik Farnbacher | 9 |
| (United States) Petersen/White Lightning | Porsche 996 GT3-RSR | Porsche 3.6 L Flat-6 | M | 31 | (Germany) Jörg Bergmeister | All |
| (United States) Petersen/White Lightning | Porsche 996 GT3-RSR | Porsche 3.6 L Flat-6 | M | 31 | (Germany) Tim Bergmeister | 1, 8* |
| (United States) Petersen/White Lightning | Porsche 996 GT3-RSR | Porsche 3.6 L Flat-6 | M | 31 | (Sweden) Niclas Jönsson | 1, 9* |
| (United States) Petersen/White Lightning | Porsche 996 GT3-RSR | Porsche 3.6 L Flat-6 | M | 31 | (United States) Patrick Long | 2–10 |
| (United States) Flying Lizard Motorsports | Porsche 996 GT3-RSR | Porsche 3.6 L Flat-6 | M | 44 | (United States) Seth Neiman | All |
| (United States) Flying Lizard Motorsports | Porsche 996 GT3-RSR | Porsche 3.6 L Flat-6 | M | 44 | (United States) Lonnie Pechnik | 1–2, 4, 7–9 |
| (United States) Flying Lizard Motorsports | Porsche 996 GT3-RSR | Porsche 3.6 L Flat-6 | M | 44 | (United States) Darren Law | 1, 3, 5–6, 9–10 |
| (United States) Flying Lizard Motorsports | Porsche 996 GT3-RSR | Porsche 3.6 L Flat-6 | M | 44 | (United States) Craig Stanton | 7* |
| (United States) Flying Lizard Motorsports | Porsche 996 GT3-RSR | Porsche 3.6 L Flat-6 | M | 45 | (United States) Johannes van Overbeek | All |
| (United States) Flying Lizard Motorsports | Porsche 996 GT3-RSR | Porsche 3.6 L Flat-6 | M | 45 | (Germany) Marc Lieb | 1, 8–9 |
| (United States) Flying Lizard Motorsports | Porsche 996 GT3-RSR | Porsche 3.6 L Flat-6 | M | 45 | (United States) Jon Fogarty | 1 |
| (United States) Flying Lizard Motorsports | Porsche 996 GT3-RSR | Porsche 3.6 L Flat-6 | M | 45 | (Germany) Wolf Henzler | 2–7, 9–10 |
| (Canada) Multimatic Motorsports Team Panoz | Panoz Esperante GT-LM | Ford (Elan) 5.0 L V8 | P | 50 | (Canada) Scott Maxwell | All |
| (Canada) Multimatic Motorsports Team Panoz | Panoz Esperante GT-LM | Ford (Elan) 5.0 L V8 | P | 50 | (Australia) David Brabham | All |
| (Canada) Multimatic Motorsports Team Panoz | Panoz Esperante GT-LM | Ford (Elan) 5.0 L V8 | P | 50 | (France) Sébastien Bourdais | 1, 9 |
| (Canada) Multimatic Motorsports Team Panoz | Panoz Esperante GT-LM | Ford (Elan) 5.0 L V8 | P | 51 | (United States) Gunnar Jeannette | All |
| (Canada) Multimatic Motorsports Team Panoz | Panoz Esperante GT-LM | Ford (Elan) 5.0 L V8 | P | 51 | (United States) Tommy Milner | All |
| (Canada) Multimatic Motorsports Team Panoz | Panoz Esperante GT-LM | Ford (Elan) 5.0 L V8 | P | 51 | (Brazil) Bruno Junqueira | 1 |
| (Canada) Multimatic Motorsports Team Panoz | Panoz Esperante GT-LM | Ford (Elan) 5.0 L V8 | P | 51 | (United States) Andy Lally | 9 |
| (Germany) Farnbacher Loles Racing | Porsche 996 GT3-RSR | Porsche 3.6 L Flat-6 | Y | 55 | (Germany) Dominik Farnbacher | 1 |
| (Germany) Farnbacher Loles Racing | Porsche 996 GT3-RSR | Porsche 3.6 L Flat-6 | Y | 55 | (Germany) Pierre Ehret | 1 |
| (Germany) Farnbacher Loles Racing | Porsche 996 GT3-RSR | Porsche 3.6 L Flat-6 | Y | 55 | (Denmark) Lars-Erik Nielsen | 1 |
| (Czech Republic) Vonka Racing | Porsche 996 GT3-RS | Porsche 3.6 L Flat-6 | D | 56 | (Czech Republic) Jan Vonka | 1 |
| (Czech Republic) Vonka Racing | Porsche 996 GT3-RS | Porsche 3.6 L Flat-6 | D | 56 | (Italy) Mauro Casadei | 1 |
| (Czech Republic) Vonka Racing | Porsche 996 GT3-RS | Porsche 3.6 L Flat-6 | D | 56 | (United Kingdom) Bo McCormick | 1 |
| (United States) Risi Competizione | Ferrari F430 GTC | Ferrari 4.0L V8 | M | 61 | (Finland) Toni Vilander | 4, 7–8 |
| (United States) Risi Competizione | Ferrari F430 GTC | Ferrari 4.0L V8 | M | 61 | (Germany) Ralf Kelleners | 4 |
| (United States) Risi Competizione | Ferrari F430 GTC | Ferrari 4.0L V8 | M | 61 | (Spain) Marc Gené | 7 |
| (United States) Risi Competizione | Ferrari F430 GTC | Ferrari 4.0L V8 | M | 61 | (Italy) Maurizio Mediani | 8–10 |
| (United States) Risi Competizione | Ferrari F430 GTC | Ferrari 4.0L V8 | M | 61 | (United States) Anthony Lazzaro | 9 |
| (United States) Risi Competizione | Ferrari F430 GTC | Ferrari 4.0L V8 | M | 61 | (United Kingdom) Marino Franchitti | 9 |
| (United States) Risi Competizione | Ferrari F430 GTC | Ferrari 4.0L V8 | M | 61 | (Italy) Andrea Bertolini | 10 |
| (United States) Risi Competizione | Ferrari F430 GTC | Ferrari 4.0L V8 | M | 62 | (Brazil) Jaime Melo | 1–3, 5–6 |
| (United States) Risi Competizione | Ferrari F430 GTC | Ferrari 4.0L V8 | M | 62 | (Germany) Ralf Kelleners | 1, 9 |
| (United States) Risi Competizione | Ferrari F430 GTC | Ferrari 4.0L V8 | M | 62 | (United States) Anthony Lazzaro | 1 |
| (United States) Risi Competizione | Ferrari F430 GTC | Ferrari 4.0L V8 | M | 62 | (Finland) Mika Salo | 2–3, 5–6, 10 |
| (United States) Risi Competizione | Ferrari F430 GTC | Ferrari 4.0L V8 | M | 62 | (Mexico) Mario Dominguez | 4, 7 |
| (United States) Risi Competizione | Ferrari F430 GTC | Ferrari 4.0L V8 | M | 62 | (Spain) Marc Gené | 4 |
| (United States) Risi Competizione | Ferrari F430 GTC | Ferrari 4.0L V8 | M | 62 | (Monaco) Stéphane Ortelli | 7–10 |
| (United States) Risi Competizione | Ferrari F430 GTC | Ferrari 4.0L V8 | M | 62 | (United Kingdom) Johnny Mowlem | 8 |
| (United States) Risi Competizione | Ferrari F430 GTC | Ferrari 4.0L V8 | M | 62 | (Finland) Markus Palttala | 9 |
| (United States) J3 Racing | Porsche 996 GT3-RSR | Porsche 3.6 L Flat-6 | Y | 78 | (United States) Spencer Pumpelly | 1 |
| (United States) J3 Racing | Porsche 996 GT3-RSR | Porsche 3.6 L Flat-6 | Y | 78 | (United States) Jep Thornton | 1 |
| (United States) J3 Racing | Porsche 996 GT3-RSR | Porsche 3.6 L Flat-6 | Y | 78 | (United States) Mark Patterson | 1 |
| (United States) J3 Racing | Porsche 996 GT3-RSR | Porsche 3.6 L Flat-6 | Y | 79 | (United Kingdom) Tim Sugden | 1 |
| (United States) J3 Racing | Porsche 996 GT3-RSR | Porsche 3.6 L Flat-6 | Y | 79 | (Germany) Wolf Henzler | 1 |
| (United States) J3 Racing | Porsche 996 GT3-RSR | Porsche 3.6 L Flat-6 | Y | 79 | (United States) Jim Matthews | 1 |
| (United Kingdom) Team LNT | Panoz Esperante GT-LM | Ford (Elan) 5.0 L V8 | P | 80 | (United Kingdom) Lawrence Tomlinson | 1 |
| (United Kingdom) Team LNT | Panoz Esperante GT-LM | Ford (Elan) 5.0 L V8 | P | 80 | (United Kingdom) Richard Dean | 1 |
| (United Kingdom) Team LNT | Panoz Esperante GT-LM | Ford (Elan) 5.0 L V8 | P | 80 | (United Kingdom) Tom Kimber-Smith | 1 |
| (Netherlands) Spyker Squadron | Spyker C8 Spyder GT2-R | Audi 3.8 L V8 | M | 85 | (Netherlands) Peter Kox | 1 |
| (Netherlands) Spyker Squadron | Spyker C8 Spyder GT2-R | Audi 3.8 L V8 | M | 85 | (Netherlands) Donny Crevels | 1 |
| (Netherlands) Spyker Squadron | Spyker C8 Spyder GT2-R | Audi 3.8 L V8 | M | 86 | (Netherlands) Jeroen Bleekemolen | 1 |
| (Netherlands) Spyker Squadron | Spyker C8 Spyder GT2-R | Audi 3.8 L V8 | M | 86 | (Netherlands) Mike Hezemans | 1 |
| (United States) Team Lexus | Lexus IS 350 | Toyota 3.5 L 2GR-FSE V6 | M | ?? | (United States) Chuck Goldsborough | None |
| (United States) Team Lexus | Lexus IS 350 | Toyota 3.5 L 2GR-FSE V6 | M | ?? | (United States) Terry Borcheller | None |
| (United States) Team Lexus | Lexus IS 350 | Toyota 3.5 L 2GR-FSE V6 | M | ?? | (United States) Andy Brumbaugh | None |
| (United States) Team Lexus | Lexus IS 350 | Toyota 3.5 L 2GR-FSE V6 | M | ?? | (United States) Townsend Bell | None |
| (United States) Team Lexus | Lexus IS 350 | Toyota 3.5 L 2GR-FSE V6 | M | ?? | (Canada) Jean-François Dumoulin | None |

* Was on the entry list but did not participate in the event.

dp7 Racing announced plans to run a pair of Mercedes SLKs in the GT2 class but this failed to materialize.

== Season results ==
Overall winner in bold.

| Rnd | Circuit | LMP1 Winning Team | LMP2 Winning Team | GT1 Winning Team | GT2 Winning Team | Results |
| Rnd | Circuit | LMP1 Winning Drivers | LMP2 Winning Drivers | GT1 Winning Drivers | GT2 Winning Drivers | Results |
|---|---|---|---|---|---|---|
| 1 | Sebring | (United States) **#2 Audi Sport North America** | (United States) #37 Intersport Racing | (United States) #4 Corvette Racing | (Canada) #50 Multimatic Motorsports | Results |
| 1 | Sebring | **(Italy) Rinaldo Capello** **(Denmark) Tom Kristensen** **(United Kingdom) Allan McNish** | (United States) Clint Field (United States) Liz Halliday (United States) Jon Field | (United Kingdom) Oliver Gavin (Monaco) Olivier Beretta (Denmark) Jan Magnussen | (Canada) Scott Maxwell (Australia) David Brabham (France) Sébastien Bourdais | Results |
| 2 | Reliant Park | (United States) **#2 Audi Sport North America** | (United States) #37 Intersport Racing | (United States) #4 Corvette Racing | (United States) #23 Alex Job Racing | Results |
| 2 | Reliant Park | **(United Kingdom) Allan McNish** **(Italy) Rinaldo Capello** | (United States) Clint Field (United States) Liz Halliday | (United Kingdom) Oliver Gavin (Monaco) Olivier Beretta | (Germany) Mike Rockenfeller (Germany) Klaus Graf | Results |
| 3 | Mid-Ohio | (United States) #2 Audi Sport North America | (United States) **#7 Penske Racing** | (United States) #4 Corvette Racing | (United States) #45 Flying Lizard Motorsports | Results |
| 3 | Mid-Ohio | (United Kingdom) Allan McNish (Italy) Rinaldo Capello | **(Germany) Timo Bernhard** **(France) Romain Dumas** | (United Kingdom) Oliver Gavin (Monaco) Olivier Beretta | (United States) Johannes van Overbeek (Germany) Wolf Henzler | Results |
| 4 | Lime Rock | (United States) **#2 Audi Sport North America** | (United States) #7 Penske Racing | (United Kingdom) #009 Aston Martin Racing | (United States) #31 Petersen/White Lightning | Results |
| 4 | Lime Rock | **(United Kingdom) Allan McNish** **(Italy) Rinaldo Capello** | (Germany) Timo Bernhard (France) Romain Dumas | (France) Stéphane Sarrazin (Portugal) Pedro Lamy | (Germany) Jörg Bergmeister (United States) Patrick Long | Results |
| 5 | Miller | (United States) **#1 Audi Sport North America** | (United States) #6 Penske Racing | (United Kingdom) #007 Aston Martin Racing | (United States) #62 Risi Competizione | Results |
| 5 | Miller | **(Germany) Frank Biela** **(Italy) Emanuele Pirro** | (Germany) Sascha Maassen (Germany) Lucas Luhr | (United Kingdom) Darren Turner (Czech Republic) Tomáš Enge | (Brazil) Jaime Melo (Finland) Mika Salo | Results |
| 6 | Portland | (United States) **#2 Audi Sport North America** | (United States) #37 Intersport Racing | (United States) #4 Corvette Racing | (United States) #62 Risi Competizione | Results |
| 6 | Portland | **(United Kingdom) Allan McNish** **(Italy) Rinaldo Capello** | (United States) Clint Field (United States) Liz Halliday | (United Kingdom) Oliver Gavin (Monaco) Olivier Beretta | (Brazil) Jaime Melo (Finland) Mika Salo | Results |
| 7 | Road America | (United States) **#1 Audi Sport North America** | (United States) #6 Penske Racing | (United States) #3 Corvette Racing | (United States) #31 Petersen/White Lightning | Results |
| 7 | Road America | **(Germany) Frank Biela** **(Italy) Emanuele Pirro** | (Germany) Sascha Maassen (Germany) Timo Bernhard | (Canada) Ron Fellows (United States) Johnny O'Connell | (Germany) Jörg Bergmeister (United States) Patrick Long | Results |
| 8 | Mosport | **(United States) #2 Audi Sport North America** | (United States) #7 Penske Racing | (United Kingdom) #009 Aston Martin Racing | (United States) #62 Risi Competizione | Results |
| 8 | Mosport | **(United Kingdom) Allan McNish** **(Italy) Rinaldo Capello** | (Germany) Lucas Luhr (France) Romain Dumas | (France) Stéphane Sarrazin (Portugal) Pedro Lamy | (Monaco) Stephane Ortelli (United Kingdom) Johnny Mowlem | Results |
| 9 | Road Atlanta | **(United States) #2 Audi Sport North America** | (United States) #6 Penske Racing | (United Kingdom) #007 Aston Martin Racing | (United States) #31 Petersen/White Lightning | Results |
| 9 | Road Atlanta | **(United Kingdom) Allan McNish** **(Italy) Rinaldo Capello** | (Germany) Sascha Maassen (Germany) Timo Bernhard (France) Emmanuel Collard | (Czech Republic) Tomáš Enge (United Kingdom) Darren Turner | (Germany) Jörg Bergmeister (United States) Patrick Long | Results |
| 10 | Laguna Seca | **(United States) #2 Audi Sport North America** | (United States) #7 Penske Racing | (United Kingdom) #009 Aston Martin Racing | (United States) #62 Risi Competizione | Results |
| 10 | Laguna Seca | **(United Kingdom) Allan McNish** **(Italy) Rinaldo Capello** | (Germany) Lucas Luhr (France) Romain Dumas | (France) Stéphane Sarrazin (Portugal) Pedro Lamy | (Finland) Mika Salo (Monaco) Stephane Ortelli | Results |

== Championship results ==
Points are awarded to the top 10 finishers in the following order:

- 20-16-13-10-8-6-4-3-2-1

Exceptions were for the 4 Hour Monterey Sports Car Championships was scored in the following order:

- 23-19-16-13-11-9-7-6-5-4

And for the 12 Hours of Sebring and the Petit Le Mans, which award the top 10 finishers in the following order:

- 26-22-19-16-14-12-10-9-8-7

Entries failing to complete 70% of the winner's distance are not awarded points. Drivers failing to drive for at least 45 minutes in the race are not awarded points.

=== LMP1 Drivers' Championship ===
| Pos. | Driver | Team | SEB (United States) | HOU (United States) | MOH (United States) | LIM (United States) | UTA (United States) | POR (United States) | ROA (United States) | MOS (Canada) | ATL (United States) | LAG (United States) | Pts. |
|---|---|---|---|---|---|---|---|---|---|---|---|---|---|
| 1 | (Italy) Rinaldo Capello | (United States) Audi Sport North America | 1 | 1 | 1 | 1 | 3 | 1 | 2 | 1 | 1 | 1 | 204 |
| 1 | (United Kingdom) Allan McNish | (United States) Audi Sport North America | 1 | 1 | 1 | 1 | 3 | 1 | 2 | 1 | 1 | 1 | 204 |
| 2 | (United Kingdom) James Weaver | (United States) Dyson Racing Team | 2 | 2 | 2 | Ret | 2 | 4 | 3 | 3 | Ret | 4 | 119 |
| 3 | (United States) Butch Leitzinger | (United States) Dyson Racing Team | 2 | 2 | 2 | Ret | 2 | 4 | 3 | 3 | Ret | | 106 |
| 4 | (Germany) Frank Biela | (United States) Audi Sport North America | Ret | | | | 1 | 2 | 1 | 4 | 5 | 2 | 99 |
| 4 | (Italy) Emanuele Pirro | (United States) Audi Sport North America | Ret | | | | 1 | 2 | 1 | 4 | 5 | 2 | 99 |
| 5 | (United States) Chris Dyson | (United States) Dyson Racing Team | Ret | 3 | Ret | Ret | 4 | 3 | 5 | 2 | Ret | 4 | 73 |
| 6 | (United Kingdom) Guy Smith | (United States) Dyson Racing Team | Ret | 3 | Ret | Ret | 4 | 3 | 5 | 2 | Ret | | 60 |
| 7 | (United States) Michael Lewis | (United States) Autocon Motorsports | Ret | | 3 | 2 | 6 | | 6 | Ret | Ret | 6 | 50 |
| 8 | (United Kingdom) Andy Wallace | (United States) Dyson Racing Team | 2 | | | | | | | | Ret | | 48 |
| 8 | (United Kingdom) Andy Wallace | (United States) Highcroft Racing | | | | Ret | 5 | 5 | 4 | | | | 48 |
| 9 | (United States) Duncan Dayton | (United States) Highcroft Racing | Ret | | | Ret | 5 | 5 | 4 | | 3 | | 45 |
| 10 | (United States) Chris McMurry | (United States) Autocon Motorsports | Ret | Ret | 3 | 2 | | 6 | 6 | Ret | Ret | | 41 |
| 11 | (Sweden) Stefan Johansson | (United Kingdom) Zytek Engineering | | | | | | | | | 2 | 5 | 33 |
| 11 | (United Kingdom) Johnny Mowlem | (United Kingdom) Zytek Engineering | | | | | | | | | 2 | 5 | 33 |
| 12 | (France) Nicolas Minassian | (United Kingdom) Creation Autosportif | | | | | | | | | 4 | 3 | 32 |
| 12 | (Switzerland) Harold Primat | (United Kingdom) Creation Autosportif | | | | | | | | | 4 | 3 | 32 |
| 13 | (Denmark) Tom Kristensen | (United States) Audi Sport North America | 1 | | | | | | | | | | 26 |
| 14 | (Japan) Haruki Kurosawa | (United Kingdom) Zytek Engineering | | | | | | | | | 2 | | 22 |
| 15 | (United States) Bryan Willman | (United States) Autocon Motorsports | Ret | Ret | | | 6 | 6 | | | Ret | 6 | 21 |
| 16 | (United States) Memo Gidley | (United States) Highcroft Racing | | | | | | | | | 3 | | 19 |
| 16 | (Brazil) Vítor Meira | (United States) Highcroft Racing | | | | | | | | | 3 | | 19 |
| 17 | (United Kingdom) Jamie Campbell-Walter | (United Kingdom) Creation Autosportif | | | | | | | | | 4 | | 16 |
| 18 | (Germany) Marco Werner | (United States) Audi Sport North America | Ret | | | | | | | | 5 | | 14 |
| 19 | (Canada) John Graham | (United States) Autocon Motorsports | | | | | | | | Ret | | 6 | 9 |
| - | (United Kingdom) Gregor Fisken | (United States) Highcroft Racing | Ret | | | | | | | | | | 0 |
| - | (United States) Rick Knoop | (United States) Highcroft Racing | Ret | | | | | | | | | | 0 |
| Pos. | Driver | Team | SEB (United States) | HOU (United States) | MOH (United States) | LIM (United States) | UTA (United States) | POR (United States) | ROA (United States) | MOS (Canada) | ATL (United States) | LAG (United States) | Pts. |

=== LMP1 Teams Championship ===
Teams only scored points for their highest finishing entry in each race. Only full season entries were classified

| Pos. | Team | No. | SEB (United States) | HOU (United States) | MOH (United States) | LIM (United States) | UTA (United States) | POR (United States) | ROA (United States) | MOS (Canada) | ATL (United States) | LAG (United States) | Pts. |
|---|---|---|---|---|---|---|---|---|---|---|---|---|---|
| 1 | (United States) Audi Sport North America | 1 | Ret | | | | 1 | 2 | 1 | 4 | 5 | 2 | 215 |
| 1 | (United States) Audi Sport North America | 2 | 1 | 1 | 1 | 1 | 3 | 1 | 2 | 1 | 1 | 1 | 215 |
| 2 | (United States) Dyson Racing Team | 16 | 2 | 2 | 2 | Ret | 2 | 4 | 3 | 3 | Ret | 4 | 125 |
| 2 | (United States) Dyson Racing Team | 20 | Ret | 3 | Ret | Ret | 4 | 3 | 5 | 2 | Ret | | 125 |
| 3 | (United States) Autocon Motorsports | 12 | Ret | Ret | 3 | 2 | 6 | 6 | 6 | Ret | Ret | 6 | 60 |
| 4 | (United States) Highcroft Racing | 9 | Ret | | | Ret | 5 | 5 | 4 | | 3 | | 50 |
| NC | (United Kingdom) Zytek Engineering | 15 | | | | | | | | | 2 | 5 | 0(33) |
| NC | (United Kingdom) Creation Autosportif | 88 | | | | | | | | | 4 | 3 | 0(32) |
| Pos. | Team | No. | SEB (United States) | HOU (United States) | MOH (United States) | LIM (United States) | UTA (United States) | POR (United States) | ROA (United States) | MOS (Canada) | ATL (United States) | LAG (United States) | Pts. |

=== LMP2 Drivers' Championship ===
| Pos. | Driver | Team | SEB (United States) | HOU (United States) | MOH (United States) | LIM (United States) | UTA (United States) | POR (United States) | ROA (United States) | MOS (Canada) | ATL (United States) | LAG (United States) | Pts. |
|---|---|---|---|---|---|---|---|---|---|---|---|---|---|
| 1 | (Germany) Sascha Maassen | (United States) Penske Racing | 2 | 3 | 2 | 2 | 1 | 2 | 1 | 2 | 1 | 2 | 184 |
| 1 | (Germany) Lucas Luhr | (United States) Penske Racing | 2 | 3 | 2 | 2 | 1 | 2 | 2 | 1 | 2 | 1 | 184 |
| 2 | (United States) Clint Field | (United States) Intersport Racing | 1 | 1 | 3 | 3 | 2 | 1 | 3 | 3 | 4 | 3 | 166 |
| 2 | (United States) Liz Halliday | (United States) Intersport Racing | 1 | 1 | 3 | 3 | 2 | 1 | 3 | 3 | 4 | 3 | 166 |
| 3 | (Germany) Timo Bernhard | (United States) Penske Racing | Ret | 5 | 1 | 1 | 3 | 3 | 1 | 2 | 1 | 2 | 155 |
| 3 | (France) Romain Dumas | (United States) Penske Racing | Ret | 5 | 1 | 1 | 3 | 3 | 2 | 1 | 2 | 1 | 155 |
| 4 | (United States) Jon Field | (United States) Intersport Racing | 1 | | | | | | 3 | | 4 | 3 | 71 |
| 5 | (United States) Guy Cosmo | (United States) B-K Motorsports | 5 | 2 | 4 | Ret | | | | | 5 | 4 | 67 |
| 5 | (United States) James Bach | (United States) B-K Motorsports | 5 | 2 | 4 | Ret | | | | | 5 | 4 | 67 |
| 6 | (France) Emmanuel Collard | (United States) Penske Racing | 2 | | | | | | | | 1 | | 48 |
| 7 | (Netherlands) Michael Vergers | (France) Barazi-Epsilon | 4 | | | | | | | | | | 27 |
| 7 | (Netherlands) Michael Vergers | (United Kingdom) Team Bruichladdich Radical | | | | | | | | | | 5 | 27 |
| 8 | (Germany) Mike Rockenfeller | (United States) Penske Racing | | | | | | | | | 2 | | 22 |
| 9 | (United Kingdom) William Binnie | (United States) Binnie Motorsports | 3 | | | | | | | | | | 19 |
| 9 | (United Kingdom) Alan Timpany | (United States) Binnie Motorsports | 3 | | | | | | | | | | 19 |
| 9 | (United States) Rick Sutherland | (United States) Binnie Motorsports | 3 | | | | | | | | | | 19 |
| 9 | (Switzerland) Fredy Lienhard | (Switzerland) Horag Racing | | | | | | | | | 3 | Ret | 19 |
| 9 | (Belgium) Didier Theys | (Switzerland) Horag Racing | | | | | | | | | 3 | Ret | 19 |
| 9 | (Belgium) Eric van de Poele | (Switzerland) Horag Racing | | | | | | | | | 3 | | 19 |
| 10 | (United States) Gunnar van der Steur | (United States) Van der Steur Racing | | 4 | 5 | Ret | | | | | Ret | Ret | 18 |
| 10 | (United Kingdom) Ben Devlin | (United States) Van der Steur Racing | | 4 | 5 | Ret | | | | | Ret | Ret | 18 |
| 11 | (Denmark) Juan Barazi | (France) Barazi-Epsilon | 4 | | | | | | | | | | 16 |
| 11 | (United States) Elton Julian | (France) Barazi-Epsilon | 4 | | | | | | | | | | 16 |
| 12 | (Brazil) Raphael Matos | (United States) B-K Motorsports | 5 | | | | | | | | | | 14 |
| 12 | (United States) Elliot Forbes-Robinson | (United States) B-K Motorsports | | | | | | | | | 5 | | 14 |
| 13 | (United Kingdom) Stuart Mosely | (United Kingdom) Team Bruichladdich Radical | | | | | | | | | | 5 | 11 |
| - | (United States) Patrick Long | (United States) Penske Racing | Ret | | | | | | | | | | 0 |
| - | (United States) Andy Lally | (United States) Miracle Motorsports | Ret | | | | | | | | | | 0 |
| - | (United States) James Gue | (United States) Miracle Motorsports | Ret | | | | | | | | | | 0 |
| - | (United States) Andrew Davis | (United States) Miracle Motorsports | Ret | | | | | | | | | | 0 |
| - | (United Kingdom) Tim Greaves | (United States) Van der Steur Racing | | | | | | | | | Ret | | 0 |
| - | (United States) Adam Pecorari | (United States) Van der Steur Racing | | | | | | | | | | Ret | 0 |
| Pos. | Driver | Team | SEB (United States) | HOU (United States) | MOH (United States) | LIM (United States) | UTA (United States) | POR (United States) | ROA (United States) | MOS (Canada) | ATL (United States) | LAG (United States) | Pts. |

=== LMP2 Teams Championship ===
Teams only scored points for their highest finishing entry in each race. Only full season entries were classified

| Pos. | Team | No. | SEB (United States) | HOU (United States) | MOH (United States) | LIM (United States) | UTA (United States) | POR (United States) | ROA (United States) | MOS (Canada) | ATL (United States) | LAG (United States) | Pts. |
|---|---|---|---|---|---|---|---|---|---|---|---|---|---|
| 1 | (United States) Penske Racing | 6 | 2 | 3 | 2 | 2 | 1 | 2 | 1 | 2 | 1 | 2 | 200 |
| 1 | (United States) Penske Racing | 7 | Ret | 5 | 1 | 1 | 3 | 3 | 2 | 1 | 2 | 1 | 200 |
| 2 | (United States) Intersport Racing | 37 | 1 | 1 | 3 | 3 | 2 | 1 | 3 | 3 | 4 | 3 | 166 |
| 3 | (United States) B-K Motorsports | 8 | 5 | 2 | 4 | Ret | | | | | 5 | 4 | 67 |
| NC | (United States) Binnie Motorsports | 41 | 3 | | | | | | | | | | 0(19) |
| NC | (Switzerland) Horag Racing | 27 | | | | | | | | | 3 | Ret | 0(19) |
| NC | (United States) Van der Steur Racing | 19 | | 4 | 5 | Ret | | | | | Ret | Ret | 0(18) |
| NC | (France) Barazi-Epsilon | 33 | 4 | | | | | | | | | | 0(16) |
| NC | (United Kingdom) Team Bruichladdich Radical | 76 | | | | | | | | | | 5 | 0(11) |
| NC | (United States) Miracle Motorsports | 10 | Ret | | | | | | | | | | 0 |
| Pos. | Team | | SEB (United States) | HOU (United States) | MOH (United States) | LIM (United States) | UTA (United States) | POR (United States) | ROA (United States) | MOS (Canada) | ATL (United States) | LAG (United States) | Pts. |

=== GT1 Drivers' Championship ===
| Pos. | Driver | Team | SEB (United States) | HOU (United States) | MOH (United States) | LIM (United States) | UTA (United States) | POR (United States) | ROA (United States) | MOS (Canada) | ATL (United States) | LAG (United States) | Pts. |
|---|---|---|---|---|---|---|---|---|---|---|---|---|---|
| 1 | (United Kingdom) Oliver Gavin | (United States) Corvette Racing | 1 | 1 | 1 | 4 | 4 | 1 | 2 | 2 | 3 | 2 | 176 |
| 1 | (Monaco) Olivier Beretta | (United States) Corvette Racing | 1 | 1 | 1 | 4 | 4 | 1 | 2 | 2 | 3 | 2 | 176 |
| 2 | (France) Stephane Sarrazin | (United Kingdom) Aston Martin Racing | 2 | 4 | 4 | 1 | 2 | 4 | 4 | 1 | 2 | 1 | 163 |
| 3 | (Czech Republic) Tomáš Enge | (United Kingdom) Aston Martin Racing | 3 | 3 | 3 | 3 | 1 | 2 | 3 | 3 | 1 | 4 | 159 |
| 4 | (Canada) Ron Fellows | (United States) Corvette Racing | 4 | 2 | 2 | 2 | 3 | 3 | 1 | 4 | 4 | 3 | 152 |
| 4 | (United States) Johnny O'Connell | (United States) Corvette Racing | 4 | 2 | 2 | 2 | 3 | 3 | 1 | 4 | 4 | 3 | 152 |
| 5 | (Portugal) Pedro Lamy | (United Kingdom) Aston Martin Racing | 2 | 4 | 4 | 1 | | 4 | 4 | 1 | 2 | 1 | 147 |
| 6 | (United Kingdom) Darren Turner | (United Kingdom) Aston Martin Racing | 3 | 3 | 3 | 3 | 1 | 2 | 3 | | 1 | 4 | 146 |
| 7 | (Denmark) Jan Magnussen | (United States) Corvette Racing | 1 | | | | | | | | 3 | | 45 |
| 8 | (Italy) Max Papis | (United States) Corvette Racing | 4 | | | | | | | | 4 | | 32 |
| 9 | (Australia) Jason Bright | (United Kingdom) Aston Martin Racing | 2 | | | | | | | | | | 22 |
| 10 | (Denmark) Nicolas Kiesa | (United Kingdom) Aston Martin Racing | 3 | | | | | | | | | | 19 |
| 11 | (Italy) Andrea Piccini | (United Kingdom) Aston Martin Racing | | | | | 2 | | | | | | 16 |
| 12 | (United States) Tom Weickardt | (Germany) Konrad Motorsports | 5 | Ret | | | | | | | | | 14 |
| 12 | (United States) Terry Borcheller | (Germany) Konrad Motorsports | 5 | | | | | | | | | | 14 |
| 12 | (France) Jean-Philippe Belloc | (Germany) Konrad Motorsports | 5 | | | | | | | | | | 14 |
| 13 | (Netherlands) Peter Kox | (United Kingdom) Aston Martin Racing | | | | | | | | 3 | | | 13 |
| - | (Italy) Paolo Ruberti | (Germany) Konrad Motorsports | Ret | Ret | | | | | | | | | 0 |
| - | (Italy) Fabio Babini | (Germany) Konrad Motorsports | Ret | | | | | | | | | | 0 |
| - | (United Kingdom) Jamie Davies | (Germany) Konrad Motorsports | Ret | | | | | | | | | | 0 |
| - | (Austria) Franz Konrad | (Germany) Konrad Motorsports | | Ret | | | | | | | | | 0 |
| Pos. | Driver | Team | SEB (United States) | HOU (United States) | MOH (United States) | LIM (United States) | UTA (United States) | POR (United States) | ROA (United States) | MOS (Canada) | ATL (United States) | LAG (United States) | Pts. |

=== GT1 Teams Championship ===
Teams only scored points for their highest finishing entry in each race.

| Pos. | Team | No. | SEB (United States) | HOU (United States) | MOH (United States) | LIM (United States) | UTA (United States) | POR (United States) | ROA (United States) | MOS (Canada) | ATL (United States) | LAG (United States) | Pts. |
|---|---|---|---|---|---|---|---|---|---|---|---|---|---|
| 1 | (United States) Corvette Racing | 3 | 4 | 2 | 2 | 2 | 3 | 3 | 1 | 4 | 4 | 3 | 189 |
| 1 | (United States) Corvette Racing | 4 | 1 | 1 | 1 | 4 | 4 | 1 | 2 | 2 | 3 | 2 | 189 |
| 2 | (United Kingdom) Aston Martin Racing | 007 | 3 | 3 | 3 | 3 | 1 | 2 | 3 | 3 | 1 | 4 | 186 |
| 2 | (United Kingdom) Aston Martin Racing | 009 | 2 | 4 | 4 | 1 | 2 | 4 | 4 | 1 | 2 | 1 | 186 |
| 3 | (Germany) Konrad Motorsports | 25 | 5 | Ret | | | | | | | | | 14 |
| 3 | (Germany) Konrad Motorsports | 26 | Ret | | | | | | | | | | 14 |
| Pos. | Team | No. | SEB (United States) | HOU (United States) | MOH (United States) | LIM (United States) | UTA (United States) | POR (United States) | ROA (United States) | MOS (Canada) | ATL (United States) | LAG (United States) | Pts. |

=== GT2 Drivers' Championship ===
| Pos. | Driver | Team | SEB (United States) | HOU (United States) | MOH (United States) | LIM (United States) | UTA (United States) | POR (United States) | ROA (United States) | MOS (Canada) | ATL (United States) | LAG (United States) | Pts. |
|---|---|---|---|---|---|---|---|---|---|---|---|---|---|
| 1 | (Germany) Jörg Bergmeister | (United States) Petersen/White Lightning | 7 | 4 | 7 | 1 | 2 | 2 | 1 | 6 | 1 | 2 | 147 |
| 2 | (United States) Johannes van Overbeek | (United States) Flying Lizard Motorsports | 2 | 2 | 1 | 2 | 3 | 4 | 5 | 3 | 5 | 6 | 141 |
| 3 | (United States) Patrick Long | (United States) Petersen/White Lightning | | 4 | 7 | 1 | 2 | 2 | 1 | 6 | 1 | 2 | 137 |
| 4 | (Germany) Wolf Henzler | (United States) J3 Racing | 9 | | | | | | | | | | 114 |
| 4 | (Germany) Wolf Henzler | (United States) Flying Lizard Motorsports | | 2 | 1 | 2 | 3 | 4 | 5 | | 5 | 6 | 114 |
| 5 | (Canada) Scott Maxwell | (Canada) Multimatic Team Panoz | 1 | 6 | 2 | 6 | 5 | 9 | 8 | Ret | 3 | Ret | 86 |
| 5 | (Australia) David Brabham | (Canada) Multimatic Team Panoz | 1 | 6 | 2 | 6 | 5 | 9 | 8 | Ret | 3 | Ret | 86 |
| 6 | (United States) Bill Auberlen | (United States) BMW Team PTG | Ret | Ret | 4 | 3 | 6 | 3 | 2 | 5 | 6 | 8 | 84 |
| 6 | (United States) Joey Hand | (United States) BMW Team PTG | Ret | Ret | 4 | 3 | 6 | 3 | 2 | 5 | 6 | 8 | 84 |
| 7 | (Finland) Mika Salo | (United States) Risi Competizione | | 3 | 6 | | 1 | 1 | | | | 1 | 82 |
| 8 | (Germany) Mike Rockenfeller | (United States) Alex Job Racing | 6 | 1 | Ret | 9 | 4 | 7 | 3 | 8 | | 3 | 80 |
| 9 | (Brazil) Jaime Melo | (United States) Risi Competizione | 3 | 3 | 6 | | 1 | 1 | | | | | 78 |
| 9 | (United States) Seth Neiman | (United States) Flying Lizard Motorsports | 4 | 5 | 3 | 8 | 8 | 5 | Ret | 7 | 7 | 4 | 78 |
| 10 | (United States) Darren Law | (United States) Flying Lizard Motorsports | 4 | | 3 | | 8 | 5 | | | 7 | 4 | 63 |
| 11 | (United States) Gunnar Jeannette | (Canada) Multimatic Team Panoz | Ret | Ret | Ret | 7 | 7 | 6 | 9 | 4 | 4 | 5 | 53 |
| 11 | (United States) Tommy Milner | (Canada) Multimatic Team Panoz | Ret | Ret | Ret | 7 | 7 | 6 | 9 | 4 | 4 | 5 | 53 |
| 12 | (Germany) Marc Lieb | (United States) Flying Lizard Motorsports | 2 | | | | | | | 3 | 5 | | 49 |
| 13 | (Monaco) Stéphane Ortelli | (United States) Risi Competizione | | | | | | | 7 | 1 | Ret | 1 | 47 |
| 14 | (France) Sébastien Bourdais | (Canada) Multimatic Team Panoz | 1 | | | | | | | | 3 | | 45 |
| 14 | (Italy) Maurizio Mediani | (United States) Risi Competizione | | | | | | | | 2 | 2 | 7 | 45 |
| 15 | (Germany) Klaus Graf | (United States) Alex Job Racing | 6 | 1 | Ret | 9 | 4 | | | | | | 44 |
| 16 | (United States) Lonnie Pechnik | (United States) Flying Lizard Motorsports | 4 | 5 | | 8 | | | Ret | 7 | 7 | | 41 |
| 16 | (United States) Anthony Lazzaro | (United States) Risi Competizione | 3 | | | | | | | | 2 | | 41 |
| 16 | (Germany) Marcel Tiemann | (United States) Alex Job Racing | | | | | | | 3 | 8 | 8 | 3 | 41 |
| 17 | (United States) Justin Marks | (United States) BMW Team PTG | Ret | Ret | 5 | 4 | 9 | 8 | 6 | Ret | 9 | Ret | 37 |
| 17 | (United States) Bryan Sellers | (United States) BMW Team PTG | Ret | | 5 | 4 | 9 | 8 | 6 | Ret | 9 | Ret | 37 |
| 18 | (Finland) Toni Vilander | (United States) Risi Competizione | | | | Ret | | | 4 | 2 | | | 26 |
| 19 | (United States) Jon Fogarty | (United States) Flying Lizard Motorsports | 2 | | | | | | | | | | 22 |
| 19 | (United Kingdom) Marino Franchitti | (United States) Risi Competizione | | | | | | | | | 2 | | 22 |
| 20 | (United Kingdom) Johnny Mowlem | (United States) Risi Competizione | | | | | | | | 1 | | | 20 |
| 21 | (Germany) Ralf Kelleners | (United States) Risi Competizione | 3 | | | Ret | | | | | Ret | | 19 |
| 22 | (Spain) Marc Gené | (United States) Risi Competizione | | | | 5 | | | 4 | | | | 18 |
| 23 | (United States) Andy Lally | (Canada) Multimatic Team Panoz | | | | | | | | | 4 | | 16 |
| 24 | (United Kingdom) Lawrence Tomlinson | (United Kingdom) Team LNT | 5 | | | | | | | | | | 14 |
| 24 | (United Kingdom) Richard Dean | (United Kingdom) Team LNT | 5 | | | | | | | | | | 14 |
| 24 | (United Kingdom) Tom Kimber-Smith | (United Kingdom) Team LNT | 5 | | | | | | | | | | 14 |
| 25 | (United Kingdom) Robin Liddell | (United States) Alex Job Racing | | | | | | 7 | | | 8 | | 13 |
| 26 | (United States) Graham Rahal | (United States) Alex Job Racing | 6 | | | | | | | | | | 12 |
| 26 | (Mexico) Mario Dominguez | (United States) Risi Competizione | | | | 5 | | | 7 | | | | 12 |
| 26 | (United States) Boris Said | (United States) BMW Team PTG | | | | | | | | | 6 | | 12 |
| 27 | (Germany) Tim Bergmeister | (United States) Petersen/White Lightning | 7 | | | | | | | | | | 10 |
| 27 | (Sweden) Niclas Jönsson | (United States) Petersen/White Lightning | 7 | | | | | | | | | | 10 |
| 28 | (Netherlands) Jeroen Bleekemolen | (Netherlands) Spyker Squadron | 8 | | | | | | | | | | 9 |
| 28 | (Netherlands) Mike Hezemans | (Netherlands) Spyker Squadron | 8 | | | | | | | | | | 9 |
| 28 | (Germany) Dominik Farnbacher | (Germany) Farnbacher Loles Racing | Ret | | | | | | | | | | 9 |
| 28 | (Germany) Dominik Farnbacher | (United States) Alex Job Racing | | | | | | | | | 8 | | 9 |
| 29 | (United Kingdom) Tim Sugden | (United States) J3 Racing | 9 | | | | | | | | | | 8 |
| 29 | (United States) Jim Matthews | (United States) J3 Racing | 9 | | | | | | | | | | 8 |
| 29 | (United Kingdom) Ian James | (United States) BMW Team PTG | Ret | | | | | | | | 9 | | 8 |
| 30 | (United States) Spencer Pumpelly | (United States) J3 Racing | 10 | | | | | | | | | | 7 |
| 30 | (United States) Jep Thornton | (United States) J3 Racing | 10 | | | | | | | | | | 7 |
| 30 | (United States) Mark Patterson | (United States) J3 Racing | 10 | | | | | | | | | | 7 |
| 30 | (Italy) Andrea Bertolini | (United States) Risi Competizione | | | | | | | | | | 7 | 7 |
| - | (Netherlands) Peter Kox | (Netherlands) Spyker Squadron | 11 | | | | | | | | | | 0 |
| - | (Netherlands) Donny Crevels | (Netherlands) Spyker Squadron | 11 | | | | | | | | | | 0 |
| - | (Denmark) Martin Jensen | (United States) BMW Team PTG | Ret | Ret | | | | | | | | | 0 |
| - | (Germany) Pierre Ehret | (Germany) Farnbacher Loles Racing | Ret | | | | | | | | | | 0 |
| - | (Denmark) Lars-Erik Nielsen | (Germany) Farnbacher Loles Racing | Ret | | | | | | | | | | 0 |
| - | (Czech Republic) Jan Vonka | (Czech Republic) Vonka Racing | Ret | | | | | | | | | | 0 |
| - | (Italy) Mauro Casadei | (Czech Republic) Vonka Racing | Ret | | | | | | | | | | 0 |
| - | (United Kingdom) Bo McCormick | (Czech Republic) Vonka Racing | Ret | | | | | | | | | | 0 |
| - | (Brazil) Bruno Junqueira | (Canada) Multimatic Team Panoz | Ret | | | | | | | | | | 0 |
| - | (Finland) Markus Palttala | (United States) Risi Competizione | | | | | | | | | Ret | | 0 |
| Pos. | Driver | Team | SEB (United States) | HOU (United States) | MOH (United States) | LIM (United States) | UTA (United States) | POR (United States) | ROA (United States) | MOS (Canada) | ATL (United States) | LAG (United States) | Pts. |

=== GT2 Teams Championship ===
Teams only scored points for their highest finishing entry in each race. Only full season entries were classified

| Pos. | Team | No. | SEB (United States) | HOU (United States) | MOH (United States) | LIM (United States) | UTA (United States) | POR (United States) | ROA (United States) | MOS (Canada) | ATL (United States) | LAG (United States) | Pts. |
|---|---|---|---|---|---|---|---|---|---|---|---|---|---|
| 1 | (United States) Risi Competizione | 61 | | | | Ret | | | 4 | 2 | 2 | 7 | 161 |
| 1 | (United States) Risi Competizione | 62 | 3 | 3 | 6 | 5 | 1 | 1 | 7 | 1 | Ret | 1 | 161 |
| 2 | (United States) Petersen/White Lightning | 31 | 7 | 4 | 7 | 1 | 2 | 2 | 1 | 6 | 1 | 2 | 147 |
| 3 | (United States) Flying Lizard Motorsports | 44 | 4 | 5 | 3 | 8 | 8 | 5 | Ret | 7 | 7 | 4 | 145 |
| 3 | (United States) Flying Lizard Motorsports | 45 | 2 | 2 | 1 | 2 | 3 | 4 | 5 | 3 | 5 | 6 | 145 |
| 4 | (Canada) Multimatic Team Panoz | 50 | 1 | 6 | 2 | 6 | 5 | 9 | 8 | Ret | 3 | Ret | 111 |
| 4 | (Canada) Multimatic Team Panoz | 51 | Ret | Ret | Ret | 7 | 7 | 6 | 9 | 4 | 4 | 5 | 111 |
| 5 | (United States) Alex Job Racing | 23 | 6 | 1 | Ret | 9 | 4 | 7 | 3 | 8 | 8 | 3 | 89 |
| 6 | (United States) BMW Team PTG | 21 | Ret | Ret | 4 | 3 | 6 | 3 | 2 | 5 | 6 | 8 | 84 |
| 6 | (United States) BMW Team PTG | 22 | Ret | Ret | 5 | 4 | 9 | 8 | 6 | Ret | 9 | Ret | 84 |
| NC | (United Kingdom) Team LNT | 80 | 5 | | | | | | | | | | 0 |
| NC | (Netherlands) Spyker Squadron | 85 | 11 | | | | | | | | | | 0 |
| NC | (Netherlands) Spyker Squadron | 86 | 8 | | | | | | | | | | 0 |
| NC | (United States) J3 Racing | 78 | 10 | | | | | | | | | | 0 |
| NC | (United States) J3 Racing | 79 | 9 | | | | | | | | | | 0 |
| NC | (Germany) Farnbacher Loles Racing | 55 | Ret | | | | | | | | | | 0 |
| NC | (Czech Republic) Vonka Racing | 56 | Ret | | | | | | | | | | 0 |
| Pos. | Team | | SEB (United States) | HOU (United States) | MOH (United States) | LIM (United States) | UTA (United States) | POR (United States) | ROA (United States) | MOS (Canada) | ATL (United States) | LAG (United States) | Pts. |
