= Intersport Racing =

American auto racing team

(United States) Intersport Racing
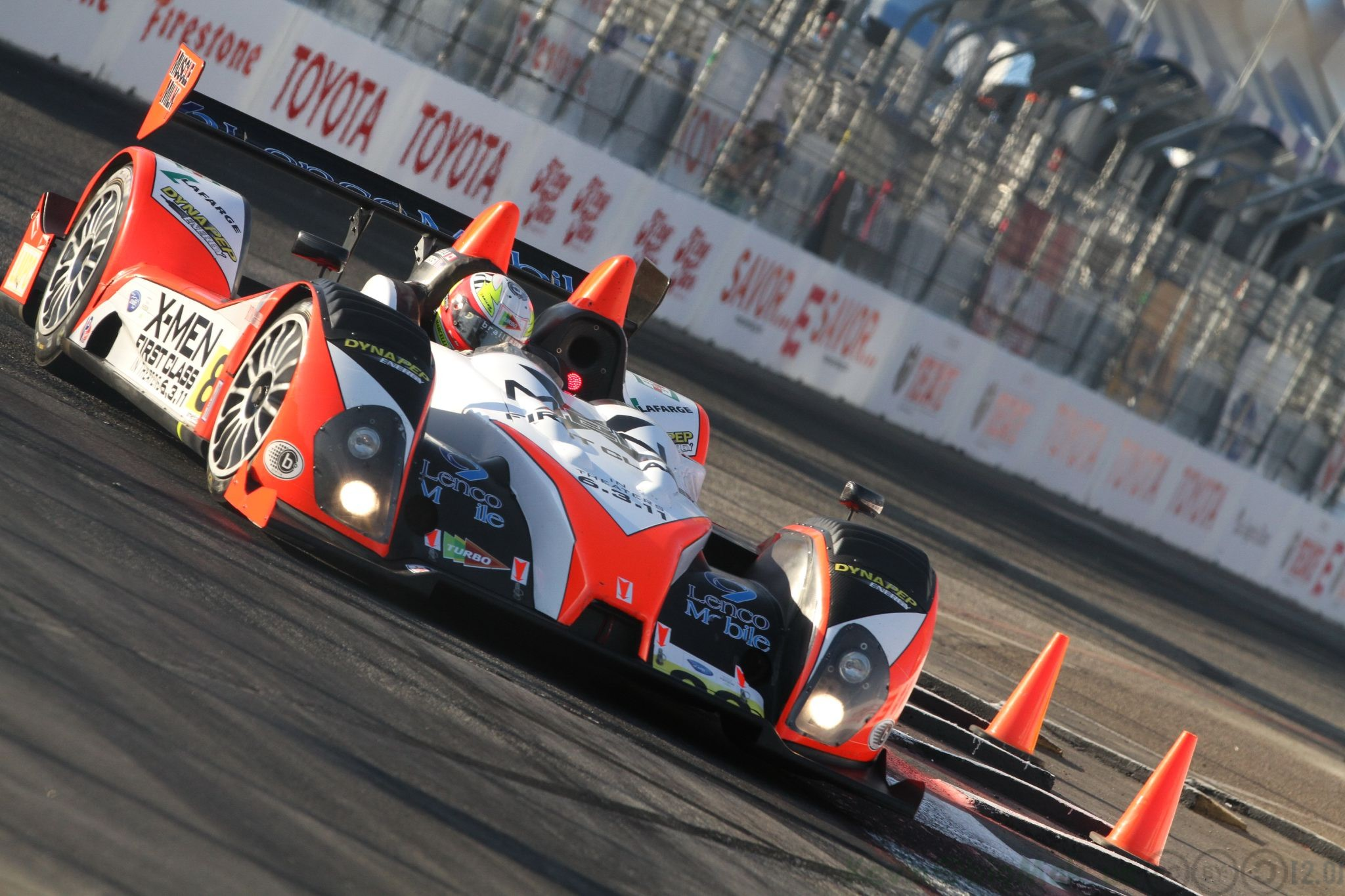
- Founded: 1998
- Team principal(s): Jon Field
- Current series: American Le Mans Series
- Former series: IMSA GT Championship; Grand American Road Racing Championship
- Teams' Championships: 1 (2005 LMP2)
- Drivers' Championships: 2 (2002 LMP675, 2005 LMP2)

Intersport Racing is an American auto racing team founded by Jon Field. In its first iteration, it was based in Dublin, Ohio. They previously operated two Oreca FLM09 sports cars in the American Le Mans Series. Though absent from racing for nearly 15 years, they are set to return to competition in 2026 in the IMSA Sportscar Championship. They will operate in a partnership with HMD Motorsports and be based at HMD's facility in Brownsburg, Indiana.

== History ==
=== Beginnings ===
The team was founded in 1998 by IMSA GT Championship driver Jon Field. Pickett bought a Riley & Scott Mk III and raced it in the WSC class. Car number 28 made its début at the 1998 12 Hours of Sebring with Field joined by Butch Brickell and Rick Sutherland but retired after 173 laps. The team finished fourth in the WSC standings.

1999 saw the birth of the American Le Mans Series. Intersport entered the 1999 season with a brand new Ford powered Lola B98/10 chassis, although Intersport did use a Riley & Scott Mk III for some events. The team raced in the LMP class for the season and team principal Field recruited Ryan Jones and Chris Goodwin for the first round of the season at Sebring. The car finished 19th overall and eleventh in class. The team did not score any podiums afterwards and did get some points finishes. Intersport finished ninth in the teams championship.

2000 saw Intersport remain in the top LMP class in ALMS with a brand new Lola B2K/10 chassis to be raced in every round with the exception of the Sebring round where the team would race the B98/10 of the previous year. Intersport also raced in the Grand-Am Road Racing Championship with the same cars as raced in ALMS. Field drove mainly in 2000 with Oliver Gavin and Rick Sutherland. They did pick up an impressive second-place finish at the Watkins Glen 6 Hours. Intersport finished seventh in the Grand-Am teams championship, whilst finishing sixth in the ALMS.

=== 2001 ===
2001 saw Intersport earning success, particularly in Grand-Am where Intersport won two events in the season in the top SRP class, winning at Mid-Ohio and Phoenix in the Lola B2K/10-Judd. Oliver Gavin was once again Field's teammate for the season. For ALMS duties, Jon gave his son Clint Field an opportunity to race alongside his father. Jon switched between Clint and Rick Sutherland throughout the season. Racing the same Lola-Judd in Grand-Am, the car did finish in the points but did not pick up any wins or podiums due to tough competition from Audi Sport who race in the LMP900 class with Intersport. The team finished sixth in the teams championship out of eight teams. Intersport did well in Grand-Am, finishing fourth in the teams championship and Field, fourth in the drivers.

=== 2002 – ALMS Success ===
For 2002, Intersport left Grand-Am and focused on ALMS. The dropped down to LMP675, the lowest Le Mans Prototype class, purchasing an MG-Lola EX257. Duncan Dayton, Michael Durand and Clint Field were his teammates during certain events over the season. LMP675 cars at first tended to be quite unreliable but at the 12 Hours of Sebring, the Intersport Lola did very well, finishing seventh overall and by far the winning LMP675 car. The next nearest LMP675 finisher finished 25th overall, 62 laps behind. Intersport picked up two more victories after Sebring, the first at the Grand Prix of Washington, D.C., and at Petit Le Mans. It was evident that the car is more suited for endurance racing rather than three hour "sprint" races. Intersport finished second in the teams championship, losing out by a point to KnightHawk Racing who used almost the same AER-powered MG-Lola car as Intersport. In the drivers championship, Field took that crown, 15 points ahead of second place Ben Devlin of Archangel Motorsports.

=== 2003–2004 ===
2003 saw little change in the Intersport camp as they stuck with the championship winning MG-Lola of 2002. They did also enter a car in the LMP900 class, racing a Judd-powered Lola B2K/10 chassis for the first half of the season then switching to a Riley & Scott Mk III C with an Élan engine. The first round at Sebring was a mixed reaction in the team with the LMP675 car finishing second in class in the hands of Field, Dayton and Durand but the LMP900 car of Field's son, Clint, Sutherland and John Macaluso retired but was disqualified anyway for receiving outside assistance while still on the race course. Round two at Road Atlanta saw the LMP675 MG-Lola win in class, narrowly ahead of the similar MG-Lola EX257 of Dyson Racing Team. Intersport also finished third place overall. Intersport took another class victory at the Grand Prix de Trois-Rivières, finishing narrowly ahead of the LMP900 class car. In October, the team returned to Road Atlanta for the Petit Le Mans which saw the MG-Lola replaced with an all new Lola B01/60. The AER two litre turbo powerplant was replaced by a naturally aspirated 3.4 litre Judd V8. It was successful, with Dayton, Jon Field and Larry Connor winning in the LMP675 class. Intersport finished second in the LMP675 teams championship and fifth in LMP900.

2003 was the teams début at the 24 Hours of Le Mans. They used the MG-Lola that was used during most of the ALMS season. They qualified second fastest in the LMP675 class behind RN Motorsports Ltd. The car retired with engine problems after 107 laps.

The 2004 American Le Mans Series season was quite similar to 2003. They used two cars throughout the season, a Lola B01/60 and Riley & Scott Mk III C in the LMP1 class and a Lola B2K/40 in the LMP2 class. It was LMP2 that was most successful for Intersport. They won six of the nine events, however the races they did not win, they did not finish at all which cost them the teams championship in the end, losing out to Miracle Motorsports. LMP1 saw very little success for Intersport, apart from second place at the Road America 500. They finished fourth in the LMP1 teams championship. The two LMP1 and LMP2 cars ran at that year's Le Mans 24 Hours. The LMP1 car was driven by Jon Field, Duncan Dayton and Larry Connor and the LMP2 car was driven by Clint Field, Rick Sutherland and William Binnie. The LMP1 car took an early exit, crashing out after 29 laps but the LMP2 car was successful, winning in class, although it was second last overall of the classified finishers.

=== 2005 – Driver and Team Glory ===
2005 saw Telesis Intersport Racing ran two LMP2 cars at the 12 Hours of Sebring before opting to race one car for the full season. Car No. 30 was a Lola B2K/40-Judd that was to be used just for Sebring and car 37 was a brand new Lola B05/40-AER which would be used for the full season. Both cars retired at Sebring before father and son, Jon and Clint won the next round in the LMP2 class at Road Atlanta. Jon only raced some events in 2005 to let Clint attempt to repeat Jon's 2002 LMP2 winning ways, with help from various teammates such as Liz Halliday and Gregor Fisken. They won four rounds after Road Atlanta, their most impressive win was on their return to Road Atlanta at the Petit Le Mans. 2005 is considered to be Intersport's most successful year. They won the teams championship in LMP2 with 133 points, 16 points ahead of Miracle Motorsports. Clint Field won the LMP2 drivers championship, racing every race for Intersport in 2005, with Jon finishing in fifth.

=== 2006 ===
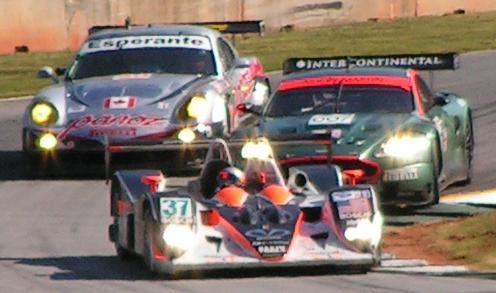
Intersport Lola B05/40 lapping GT cars at the 2006 Petit Le Mans.

2006 was a tough year for Intersport with the arrival of Penske Racing and the Porsche RS Spyder. The Porsche was very fast and reliable winning overall in some races over LMP1 cars. Clint Field and Liz Halliday were the full season drivers with appearances from Jon Field and Duncan Dayton. The Intersport Lola-AER was very quick at Sebring winning in LMP2 class and finishing second overall, four laps behind Audi's new diesel R10. They won the following round in Texas after mechanical problems for the leading Penske Porsche forced it to retire. Penske got the car sorted out and started winning in LMP2. Intersport won just one race after the Texas round which was at Portland after the leading Porsche retired due to a battery falling off the car from earlier contact between Highcroft Racing and part-time Intersport driver Duncan Dayton. Intersport finished second in LMP2 teams championship 34 points behind Penske and an impressive 99 points ahead of third place B-K Motorsports.

Interpsport returned to Le Mans in 2006 with Clint Field, Halliday and Dayton piloting the Lola-AER. Intersport finished 19th overall and fourth in LMP2 class.

=== 2007–2008 ===
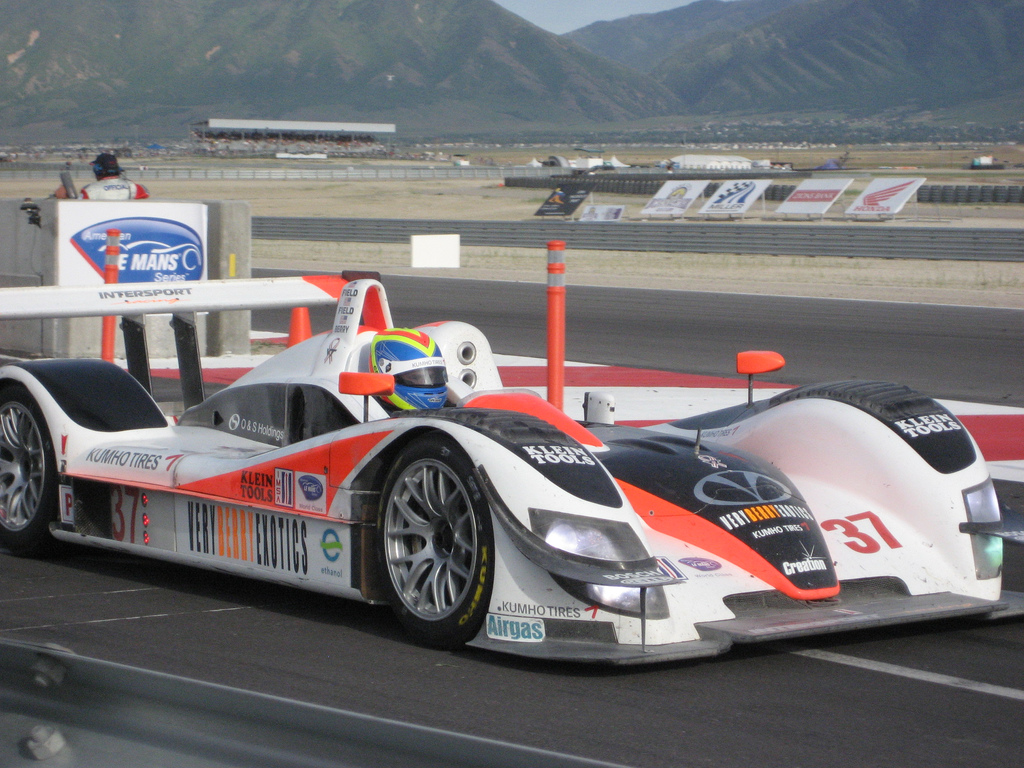
Intersport's new Creation CA06/H at the 2007 Utah Grand Prix.

2007 saw Intersport return to LMP1 with a brand new Creation CA06/H chassis, powered by a five-litre Judd V10. Unfortunately, Audi Sport North America dominated the LMP1 class with their diesel R10, winning every race in LMP1 class. Their best class finish was second at the Northeast Grand Prix with Jon and Clint joined by Richard Berry. After seven consecutive points finishes, the seventh round at Mid-Ohio was the final race in which Intersport scored points. For Petit Le Mans, Intersport purchased the ex-Dyson Racing Lola B06/10-AER but this did not help their points drought, retiring at Road Atlanta and in Laguna Seca.

The 2008 season saw Intersport race the Lola they debuted at Petit Le Mans in 2007. There was very little competition in LMP1, with no other team racing a full season with the exception of the dominant Audi team and Autocon Motorsports. Intersport did get a win which was at Detroit when the initial LMP1 winner, the No. 1 Audi failed post-race inspection as the car was under the minimum weight requirement for its class (900 kg). Jon, Clint and Richard Berry won in LMP1 from 22nd overall. Due to Intersport being the only other decent full season entry apart from Audi, they comfortably finished second in the teams championship in LMP1.

=== 2009–2010 ===
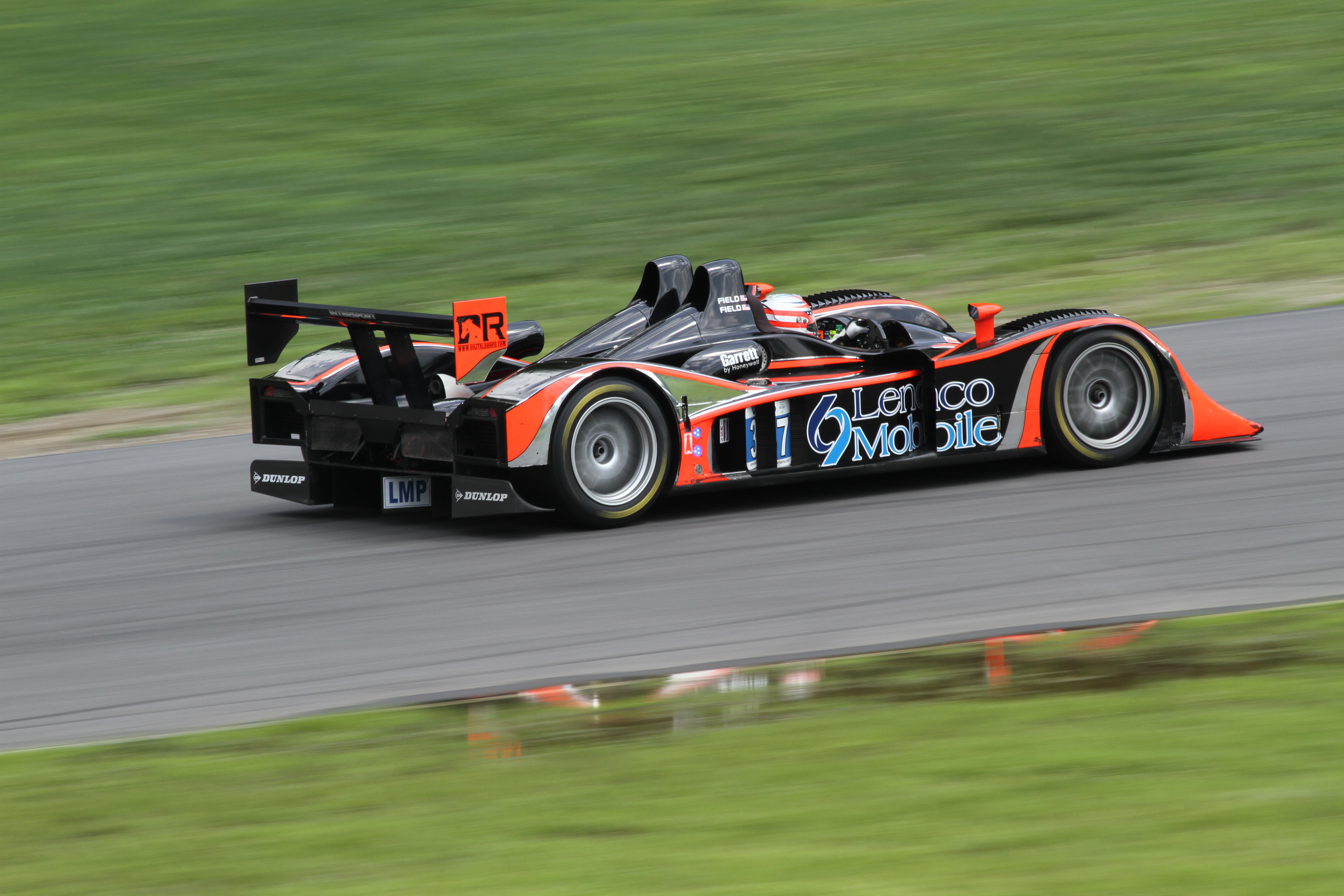
Intersport Lola B06/10 at the 2010 Northeast Grand Prix.

2009 saw Acura replace Audi as the dominant LMP1 force as Audi did not enter a full ALMS season, only racing at the long events such as Sebring and Petit Le Mans. Intersport used the same Lola-AER as before. Their best finish was second place at St. Pete. The team finished third in the LMP1 teams championship behind the Acura teams of Highcroft Racing and de Ferran Motorsports.

2010 was another unsuccessful season for Intersport with LMP1 and LMP2 merging to form a single LMP class. Intersport used the same Lola-AER that has been plagued with reliability problems but the four litre twin-turbo V8 has shown glimpses of its pace with the car leading overall for a brief period at Laguna Seca before retiring with a turbo problem. The two LMP classes split at the Sebring and Petit Le Mans rounds. At the 2010 Petit Le Mans, Intersport was the surprise package as the mechanically troubled Lola-AER completed the race in fifth overall and fourth in LMP1 class but scored the maximum 30 points as it was the highest placed full season LMP1 entry.

The 2010 season saw interesting new changes in classes. One of those was the new Le Mans Prototype Challenge (LMPC) class which was introduced. It was a spec class using the same cars used in Formula Le Mans. Intersport bought one of these Oreca FLM09 cars and ran a full season with many different drivers. Intersport finished fourth in the championship.

=== 2011 ===
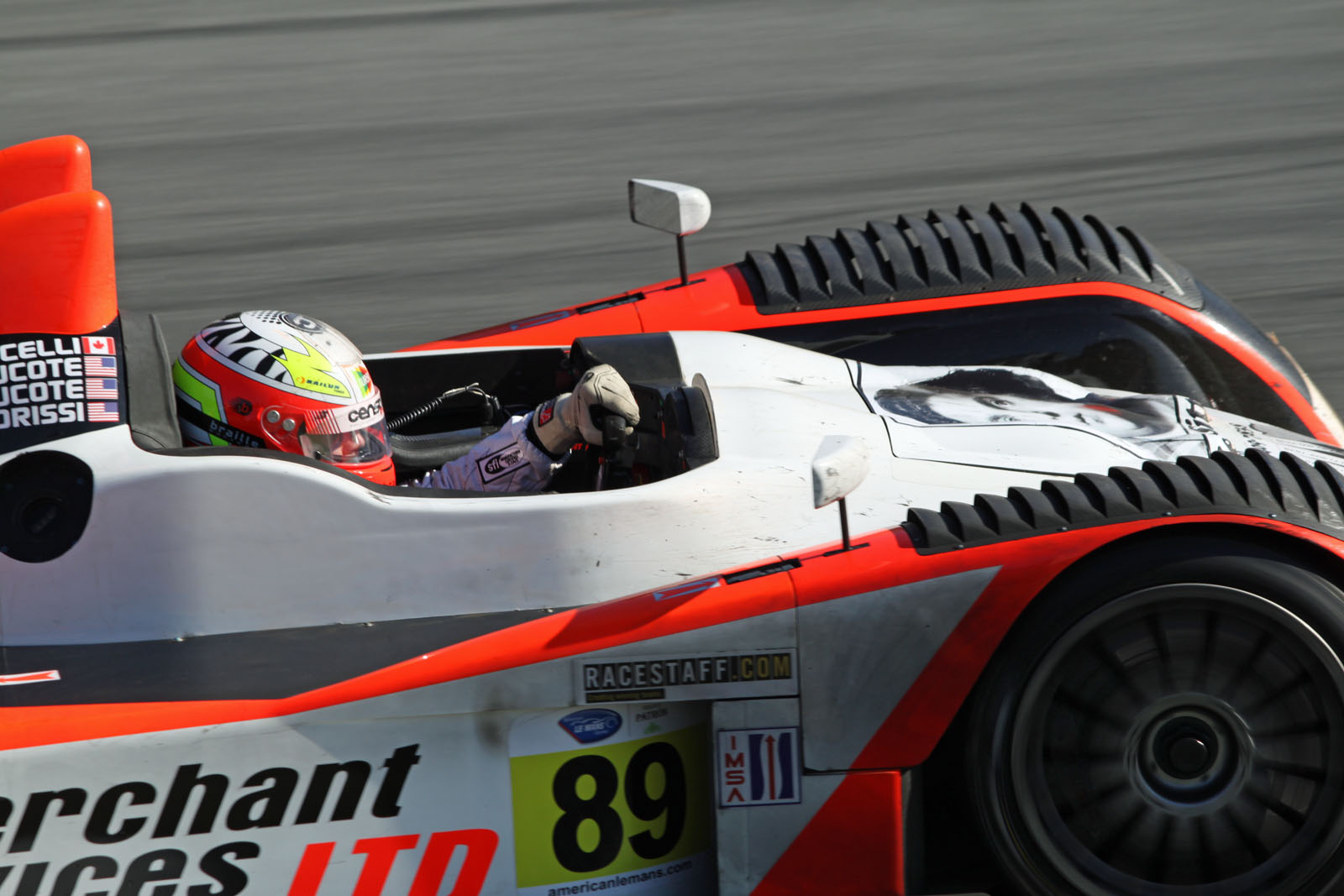
Kyle Marcelli driving the #89 Oreca FLM09 at the 2011 Petit Le Mans.

For the 2011 American Le Mans Series season, Intersport left the B06/10 and used two Oreca FLM09 LMPC cars. The team finished third in the Teams' Championship out of five teams. They won two of the nine rounds during the season, the first being at Mid-Ohio where Kyle Marcelli and Tomy Drissi drove the #37 car across the chequered flag. The same duo won Intersports second and only win in 2011 at the Baltimore Grand Prix although in the #89 car this time round. There were many different driver combinations used by the team throughout the season. Of the ten drivers that competed for Intersport throughout the season, Kyle Marcelli was the highest placed driver in the Drivers' Championship finishing in third place.

=== 2026 - Return to racing ===
Intersport Racing announced that they would return to racing in 2026 in the IMSA SportsCar Championship, ending a 14-year absence from racing. The team will run in partnership with HMD Motorsports and field an Oreca 07 in the LMP2 class. The team announced that aside from Jon Field driving, they had also hired Oliver Jarvis, Job van Uitert, and Seth Lucas as drivers for the 2026 season.

== Racing record ==
=== 24 Hours of Le Mans results ===
Year	Entrant	No.	Car	Drivers	Class	Laps	Pos.	Class Pos.
2003	(United States) Intersport Racing	27	MG-Lola EX257-AER	(United States) Duncan Dayton (United States) Jon Field (United States) Rick Sutherland	LMP675	107	DNF	DNF
2004	(United States) Intersport Racing	27	Lola B01/60-Judd	(United States) Larry Connor (United States) Duncan Dayton (United States) Jon Field	LMP1	29	DNF	DNF
2004	(United States) Intersport Racing	32	Lola B2K/40-Judd	(United States) Bill Binnie (United States) Clint Field (United States) Rick Sutherland	LMP2	278	25th	1st
2005	(United States) Intersport Racing	32	Lola B05/40-AER	(United States) Liz Halliday (United Kingdom) Sam Hancock (United Kingdom) Gregor Fisken	LMP2	119	DNF	DNF
2005	(United States) Intersport Racing (United Kingdom) Cirtek Motorsport	33	Courage C65-AER	(Denmark) Juan Barazi (France) Bastien Brière (Russia) Sergey Zlobin	LMP2	30	DNF	DNF
2006	(United States) Intersport Racing	33	Lola B05/40-AER	(United States) Duncan Dayton (United States) Clint Field (United States) Liz Halliday	LMP2	297	19th	4th
