= 2006 Petit Le Mans =

Sportscar endurance race in Georgia, US

The Track map of Road Atlanta

The 2006 Petit Le Mans was the penultimate race for the 2006 American Le Mans Series season. It took place on September 30, 2006.

== Official results ==
Class winners in bold. Cars failing to complete 70% of winner's distance marked as Not Classified (NC).

Pos	Class	No	Team	Drivers	Chassis	Tyre	Laps
Pos	Class	No	Team	Drivers	Engine	Tyre	Laps
1	**LMP1**	**2**	**(United States) Audi Sport North America**	**(United Kingdom) Allan McNish (Italy) Rinaldo Capello**	**Audi R10 TDI**	M	**394**
1	**LMP1**	**2**	**(United States) Audi Sport North America**	**(United Kingdom) Allan McNish (Italy) Rinaldo Capello**	**Audi TDI 5.5L Turbo V12 (Diesel)**	M	**394**
2	LMP1	15	(United Kingdom) Zytek Engineering	(Sweden) Stefan Johansson (United Kingdom) Johnny Mowlem (Japan) Haruki Kurosawa	Zytek 06S	M	390
2	LMP1	15	(United Kingdom) Zytek Engineering	(Sweden) Stefan Johansson (United Kingdom) Johnny Mowlem (Japan) Haruki Kurosawa	Zytek 2ZG408 4.0L V8	M	390
3	LMP1	9	(United States) Highcroft Racing	(United States) Duncan Dayton (Brazil) Vítor Meira (United States) Memo Gidley	MG-Lola EX257	D	389
3	LMP1	9	(United States) Highcroft Racing	(United States) Duncan Dayton (Brazil) Vítor Meira (United States) Memo Gidley	AER P07 2.0L Turbo I4	D	389
4	LMP1	88	(United Kingdom) Creation Autosportif	(France) Nicolas Minassian (United Kingdom) Jamie Campbell-Walter (Switzerland) Harold Primat	Creation CA06/H	M	388
4	LMP1	88	(United Kingdom) Creation Autosportif	(France) Nicolas Minassian (United Kingdom) Jamie Campbell-Walter (Switzerland) Harold Primat	Judd GV5 S2 5.0L V10	M	388
5	**LMP2**	**6**	**(United States) Penske Racing**	**(Germany) Sascha Maassen (Germany) Timo Bernhard (France) Emmanuel Collard**	**Porsche RS Spyder**	M	**386**
5	**LMP2**	**6**	**(United States) Penske Racing**	**(Germany) Sascha Maassen (Germany) Timo Bernhard (France) Emmanuel Collard**	**Porsche MR6 3.4L V8**	M	**386**
6	LMP2	7	(United States) Penske Racing	(Germany) Lucas Luhr (France) Romain Dumas (Germany) Mike Rockenfeller	Porsche RS Spyder	M	385
6	LMP2	7	(United States) Penske Racing	(Germany) Lucas Luhr (France) Romain Dumas (Germany) Mike Rockenfeller	Porsche MR6 3.4L V8	M	385
7	LMP1	1	(United States) Audi Sport North America	(Germany) Frank Biela (Italy) Emanuele Pirro (Germany) Marco Werner	Audi R10 TDI	M	383
7	LMP1	1	(United States) Audi Sport North America	(Germany) Frank Biela (Italy) Emanuele Pirro (Germany) Marco Werner	Audi TDI 5.5L Turbo V12 (Diesel)	M	383
8	**GT1**	**007**	**(United Kingdom) Aston Martin Racing**	**(United Kingdom) Darren Turner (Czech Republic) Tomáš Enge**	**Aston Martin DBR9**	P	**374**
8	**GT1**	**007**	**(United Kingdom) Aston Martin Racing**	**(United Kingdom) Darren Turner (Czech Republic) Tomáš Enge**	**Aston Martin 6.0L V12**	P	**374**
9	GT1	009	(United Kingdom) Aston Martin Racing	(Portugal) Pedro Lamy (France) Stéphane Sarrazin	Aston Martin DBR9	P	373
9	GT1	009	(United Kingdom) Aston Martin Racing	(Portugal) Pedro Lamy (France) Stéphane Sarrazin	Aston Martin 6.0L V12	P	373
10	GT1	3	(United States) Corvette Racing	(Canada) Ron Fellows (United States) Johnny O'Connell (Italy) Max Papis	Chevrolet Corvette C6.R	M	372
10	GT1	3	(United States) Corvette Racing	(Canada) Ron Fellows (United States) Johnny O'Connell (Italy) Max Papis	Chevrolet LS7r 7.0L V8	M	372
11	GT1	4	(United States) Corvette Racing	(United Kingdom) Oliver Gavin (Monaco) Olivier Beretta (Denmark) Jan Magnussen	Chevrolet Corvette C6.R	M	371
11	GT1	4	(United States) Corvette Racing	(United Kingdom) Oliver Gavin (Monaco) Olivier Beretta (Denmark) Jan Magnussen	Chevrolet LS7r 7.0L V8	M	371
12	LMP2	27	(Switzerland) Horag-Lista Racing	(Switzerland) Fredy Lienhard (Belgium) Didier Theys (Belgium) Eric van de Poele	Lola B05/40	M	371
12	LMP2	27	(Switzerland) Horag-Lista Racing	(Switzerland) Fredy Lienhard (Belgium) Didier Theys (Belgium) Eric van de Poele	Judd XV675 3.4L V8	M	371
13	LMP2	37	(United States) Intersport Racing	(United States) Jon Field (United States) Clint Field (United States) Liz Halliday	Lola B05/40	G	357
13	LMP2	37	(United States) Intersport Racing	(United States) Jon Field (United States) Clint Field (United States) Liz Halliday	AER P07 2.0L Turbo I4	G	357
14	**GT2**	**31**	**(United States) Petersen Motorsports (United States) White Lightning Racing**	**(Germany) Jörg Bergmeister (United States) Patrick Long**	**Porsche 911 GT3-RSR**	M	**356**
14	**GT2**	**31**	**(United States) Petersen Motorsports (United States) White Lightning Racing**	**(Germany) Jörg Bergmeister (United States) Patrick Long**	**Porsche 3.6L Flat-6**	M	**356**
15	GT2	61	(United States) Risi Competizione	(United States) Anthony Lazzaro (Italy) Maurizio Mediani (United Kingdom) Marino Franchitti	Ferrari F430 GT2	M	354
15	GT2	61	(United States) Risi Competizione	(United States) Anthony Lazzaro (Italy) Maurizio Mediani (United Kingdom) Marino Franchitti	Ferrari 4.0L V8	M	354
16	GT2	50	(Canada) Multimatic Motorsports Team Panoz	(Canada) Scott Maxwell (Australia) David Brabham (France) Sébastien Bourdais	Panoz Esperante GT-LM	P	352
16	GT2	50	(Canada) Multimatic Motorsports Team Panoz	(Canada) Scott Maxwell (Australia) David Brabham (France) Sébastien Bourdais	Ford (Élan) 5.0L V8	P	352
17	GT2	51	(Canada) Multimatic Motorsports Team Panoz	(United States) Gunnar Jeannette (United States) Tommy Milner (United States) Andy Lally	Panoz Esperante GT-LM	P	351
17	GT2	51	(Canada) Multimatic Motorsports Team Panoz	(United States) Gunnar Jeannette (United States) Tommy Milner (United States) Andy Lally	Ford (Élan) 5.0L V8	P	351
18	GT2	45	(United States) Flying Lizard Motorsports	(United States) Johannes van Overbeek (Germany) Wolf Henzler (Germany) Marc Lieb	Porsche 911 GT3-RSR	M	346
18	GT2	45	(United States) Flying Lizard Motorsports	(United States) Johannes van Overbeek (Germany) Wolf Henzler (Germany) Marc Lieb	Porsche 3.6L Flat-6	M	346
19	GT2	21	(United States) BMW Team PTG	(United States) Bill Auberlen (United States) Joey Hand (United States) Boris Said	BMW M3	Y	344
19	GT2	21	(United States) BMW Team PTG	(United States) Bill Auberlen (United States) Joey Hand (United States) Boris Said	BMW 3.2L I6	Y	344
20	GT2	44	(United States) Flying Lizard Motorsports	(United States) Seth Neiman (United States) Lonnie Pechnik (United States) Darren Law	Porsche 911 GT3-RSR	M	343
20	GT2	44	(United States) Flying Lizard Motorsports	(United States) Seth Neiman (United States) Lonnie Pechnik (United States) Darren Law	Porsche 3.6L Flat-6	M	343
21	GT2	23	(United States) Alex Job Racing	(Germany) Marcel Tiemann (United Kingdom) Robin Liddell (Germany) Dominik Farnbacher	Porsche 911 GT3-RSR	M	339
21	GT2	23	(United States) Alex Job Racing	(Germany) Marcel Tiemann (United Kingdom) Robin Liddell (Germany) Dominik Farnbacher	Porsche 3.6L Flat-6	M	339
22 DNF	LMP2	8	(United States) B-K Motosport	(United States) Guy Cosmo (United States) Jamie Bach (United States) Elliot Forbes-Robinson	Courage C65	K	309
22 DNF	LMP2	8	(United States) B-K Motosport	(United States) Guy Cosmo (United States) Jamie Bach (United States) Elliot Forbes-Robinson	Mazda R20B 2.0L 3-Rotor	K	309
23 DNF	GT2	22	(United States) BMW Team PTG	(United States) Justin Marks (United States) Bryan Sellers (United States) Ian James	BMW M3	Y	304
23 DNF	GT2	22	(United States) BMW Team PTG	(United States) Justin Marks (United States) Bryan Sellers (United States) Ian James	BMW 3.2L I6	Y	304
24 DNF	LMP1	16	(United States) Dyson Racing	(United Kingdom) James Weaver (United Kingdom) Andy Wallace (United States) Butch Leitzinger	Lola B06/10	M	221
24 DNF	LMP1	16	(United States) Dyson Racing	(United Kingdom) James Weaver (United Kingdom) Andy Wallace (United States) Butch Leitzinger	AER P32T 3.6L Turbo V8	M	221
25 DNF	LMP1	12	(United States) Autocon Motorsport	(United States) Mike Lewis (United States) Chris McMurry (United States) Bryan Willman	MG-Lola EX257	D	127
25 DNF	LMP1	12	(United States) Autocon Motorsport	(United States) Mike Lewis (United States) Chris McMurry (United States) Bryan Willman	AER P07 2.0L Turbo I4	D	127
26 DNF	LMP1	20	(United States) Dyson Racing	(United Kingdom) Guy Smith (United States) Chris Dyson	Lola B06/10	M	100
26 DNF	LMP1	20	(United States) Dyson Racing	(United Kingdom) Guy Smith (United States) Chris Dyson	AER P32T 3.6L Turbo V8	M	100
27 DNF	GT2	62	(United States) Risi Competizione	(Monaco) Stéphane Ortelli (Germany) Ralf Kelleners (Finland) Markus Palttala	Ferrari F430 GT2	M	61
27 DNF	GT2	62	(United States) Risi Competizione	(Monaco) Stéphane Ortelli (Germany) Ralf Kelleners (Finland) Markus Palttala	Ferrari 4.0L V8	M	61
28 DNF	LMP2	19	(United States) Van der Steur Racing	(United States) Gunnar van der Steur (United Kingdom) Ben Devlin (United Kingdom) Tim Greaves	Radical SR9	K	6
28 DNF	LMP2	19	(United States) Van der Steur Racing	(United States) Gunnar van der Steur (United Kingdom) Ben Devlin (United Kingdom) Tim Greaves	AER P07 2.0L Turbo I4	K	6

== Statistics ==
- Pole Position - #88 Creation Autosportif - 1:10.829
- Fastest Lap - #16 Dyson Racing - 1:12.374
- Average Speed - 107.835 mph (173.544 km/h)

American Le Mans Series
Previous race: 2006 Grand Prix of Mosport	2006 season	Next race: 2006 Monterey Sports Car Championships
