= Liz Halliday-Sharp =

American auto racer and equestrian

Liz Halliday
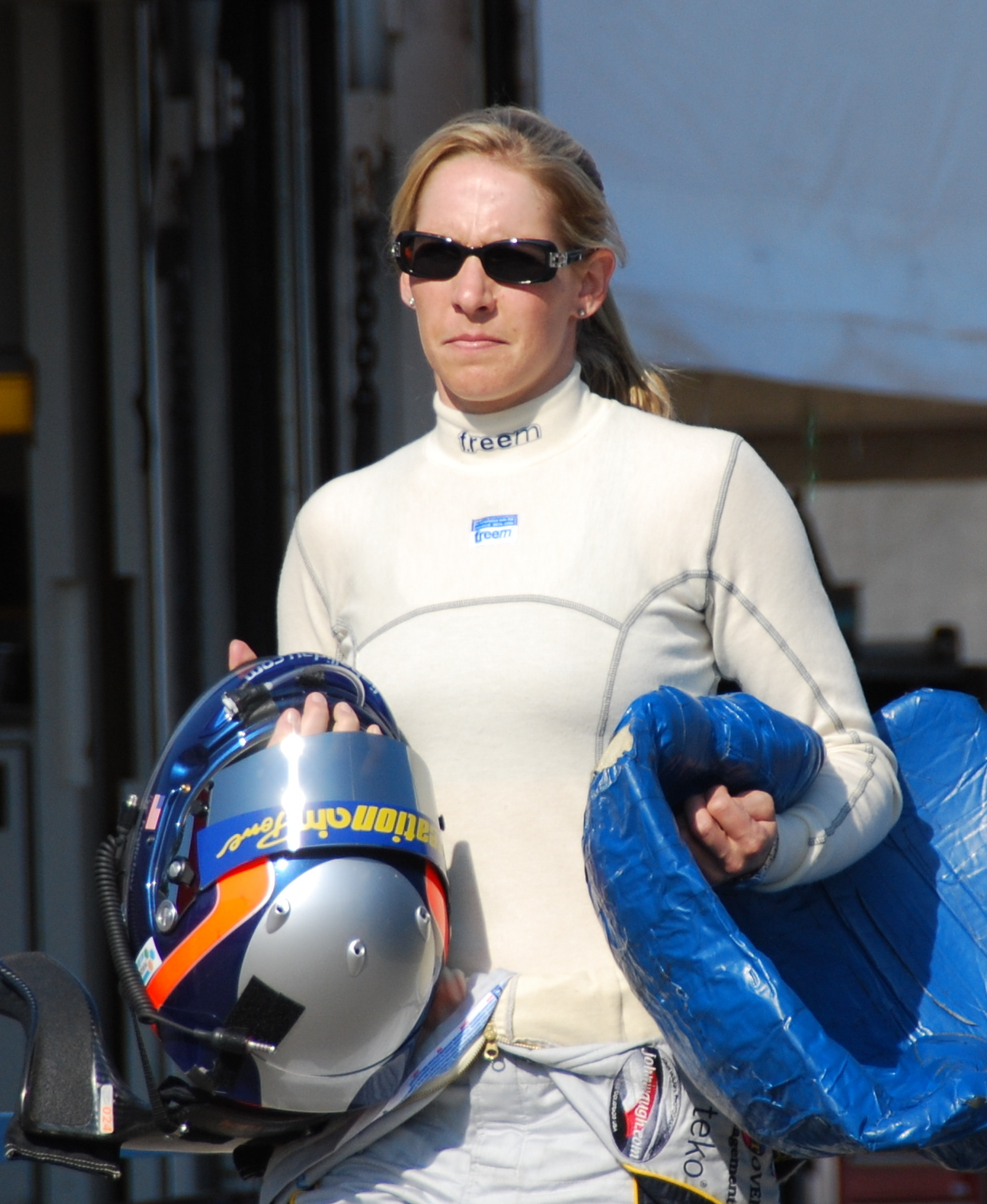
- Halliday at the 2008 Petit Le Mans weekend
- Nationality: United States
- Born: Elisabeth Marian Halliday; December 14, 1978 (age 47) San Diego, California, U.S.

Lotus Cup UK career
- Debut season: 2012

Previous series
- 2010 2010 2010 2005-07 2004-08 2004-05 2004 2003 2001-04 2001-03: Kumho BMW Championship; Rolex Sports Car Series; Silverstone Classic; 24 Hours of Le Mans; American Le Mans Series; European Endurance Racing Club; Oulton Park International Gold Cup; Bathurst 24 Hour; British GT Championship; FIA GT Championship

Awards
- 2010 2005 2003 2002 2002: Italian Historic Cup GT1 Winner; Dailysportscar Rookie of the Year; Kumho Driver of the Day; Kumho Driver of the Season; EERC Driver of the Day
Medal record
Equestrian
Representing the United States
Pan American Games
Silver medal – second place	2023 Santiago	Team eventing

Elisabeth Marian Halliday-Sharp (née Halliday; born December 14, 1978) is an American equestrian, race-car driver and commentator. She was born in San Diego, California, and currently lives in Lexington, Kentucky. Before becoming a full-time equestrian, Halliday was the most successful female driver in the American Le Mans Series with six victories. Halliday stated that her ambition was to become the first woman to win the 24 Hours of Le Mans race and to earn a spot on the United States Equestrian Team. In August 2024, Halliday suffered a traumatic brain injury during equestrian competition.

== Career ==
=== Equestrian: Three Day Eventing ===
Halliday first rode horses when she was eight years old, and went to England as a pupil of William Fox-Pitt. Halliday is an eventer. She was a member of the Fallbrook Pony Club and the Southern California Show Jumping team, which finished third in the National Pony Club Championships. Her hopes of qualifying for the United States equestrian team for the 2004 Summer Olympics were dashed when she was eliminated in a jumping event.

In May 2021, Halliday and her ride Deniro Z were named to the U.S. eventing team for the Tokyo 2020 Olympic Games. She was withdrawn shortly before the Olympics after Deniro Z got sidelined through injury.

In 2024, Halliday was named as the travelling reserve for the U.S. eventing team at the 2024 Summer Olympics. After Will Coleman pulled out of the competition, Halliday and Nutcracker made their Olympic debut.

On August 29, 2024, Halliday suffered a traumatic brain injury after falling during a cross country round at the USEA American Eventing Championships. Her horse, Shanroe Cooley was reportedly uninjured in the fall.

In September 2025, Halliday reported that she was riding again in a therapeutic capacity. In 2026, it was announced Halliday would switch disciplines to Grade 2 para-dressage. Grade 2 is designated for riders with severe impairment in one or two limbs.

=== Racing ===
Halliday first started racing at age 16 in a 1967 Datsun 510 that she shared with her father, Don, who was a Sports Car Club of America instructor and vintage racer. When she attended the University of California, Santa Barbara, she was involved in low-level motor clubs and the Vintage Auto Association. In 2001, Halliday raced in the Kumho BMW Championship series for Mosely Motorsport in the M3 E30, and was named "Driver of the Season" in 2002. A year later, Halliday recorded one win and broke the class lap record at Croft, earning her "Driver of the Day" honors. In 2003, Halliday became the first woman to win a British GT Championship round.

In 2005, Halliday made her 24 Hours of Le Mans debut in the LMP2 class, and was leading the class until she was forced to retire eleven hours into the race due to engine problems. A year later, she finished fourth in the class. After her contract with Team Modena was terminated, Halliday raced for the Noël Del Bello Racing Team in a Courage-AER LC75, which she shared with Romain Iannetta and Vitaly Petrov. However, the team was only able to finish 198 laps at the 2007 24 Hours of Le Mans, and finished 38th.

In parallel, Halliday competed at the LMP2 class of the American Le Mans Series for Intersport Racing, finishing sixth in 2005 and vice-champion in 2006. She collected three class wins in each season, most notably at the 2005 Petit Le Mans and the 2006 12 Hours of Sebring, where she finished second overall.

Halliday had a two-year hiatus from racing to be a commentator for Eurosport covering the 24 Hours of Le Mans, as well as an expert judge at Speed's GT Academy series. She also covered the American Le Mans series for CBS Sports throughout 2007, as well as for Motors TV during their Le Mans broadcasts. Halliday has also served as a mentor and judge in the Sky One series The Race.

It's a big honour for me to have been selected for the GT Academy USA expert panel alongside two legends of American motorsport, especially as we have now helped to ignite one man's future racing career. We've seen with Lucas in Europe that a talented virtual racer also has the potential to become an excellent professional driver in the real world. To step from virtual simulation to Le Mans 24 Hours in just over three years is an unbelievable achievement and one that our winner will be hoping to emulate one day. Their life is about to change forever and I'm really excited to be a part of that.

— Halliday about being selected for GT Academy's expert panel

In 2012, Halliday made her return to racing in the Lotus Cup UK series at Silverstone Circuit for John Danby Racing, and finished the race second after starting in last place.

At the 2014 and 2015 24 Hours of Le Mans, she worked as a pit-lane reporter for the Eurosport television network.

== Motorsports career results ==
=== Rolex Sports Car Series ===
==== Grand Touring ====
(key) Bold – Pole Position. (Overall Finish/Class Finish).

Grand-Am Rolex Sports Car Series GT results
Year	Team	No.	Chassis	1	2	3	4	5	6	7	8	9	10	11	12	Pos	Pts
2004	The Racer's Group	67	Pontiac GT3 RS	DAY	HOM (16/3)	PHO (26/4)	MOT (28/7)	WGL (34/9)	DAY (16/**4**)	MOH (16/5)	WGL (29/7)	HOM	VIR	BAR	FON	15th	156

=== Complete 24 Hours of Le Mans results ===
Year	Team	Co-Drivers	Car	Class	Laps	Pos.	Class Pos.
2005	(United States) Intersport Racing	(United Kingdom) Sam Hancock (United Kingdom) Gregor Fisken	Lola B05/40 / AER	LMP2	119	DNF	DNF
2006	(United States) Intersport Racing	(United States) Clint Field (United States) Duncan Dayton	Lola B05/40 / AER	LMP2	297	19th	4th
2007	(France) Noël del Bello Racing	(Russia) Vitaly Petrov (France) Romain Iannetta	Courage LC75 / AER	LMP2	198	DNF	DNF

== Equestrian career results ==
=== CCI5* results ===
Results
Event	Kentucky	Badminton	Luhmühlen	Burghley	Pau	Adelaide
2015	EL (Fernhill By Night)					
2016	40th (HHS Cooley); EL (Fernhill By Night)					
2017	EL (Fernhill By Night)					
2018			8th (Deniro Z)			
2019	EL (Deniro Z)			15th (Deniro Z)		
2021	10th (Deniro Z); 42nd (Cooley Quicksilver)					
EL = Eliminated; RET = Retired; WD = Withdrew
