= 2008 American Le Mans Series =

American motorsport season

Seasons
- ← 2007 2009 →

The 2008 American Le Mans Series season was the 38th season for the IMSA GT Championship, with the tenth season known as the American Le Mans Series. It was a series for Le Mans Prototypes (LMP) and Grand Tourer (GT) race cars divided into four classes: LMP1, LMP2, GT1, and GT2. It began March 15 and ended October 18 after eleven races.

The Audi Sport North America team wrapped up its title defence of LMP1 class Teams Championship with three races in hand after the Sports Car Challenge of Mid-Ohio in August. Drivers Marco Werner and Lucas Luhr also secured the Drivers Championship after the Detroit Sports Car Challenge. It was a record fifth ALMS drivers title for Luhr and a fourth for Werner.

The Petit Le Mans saw the drivers title for GT1 decided with Jan Magnussen and Johnny O'Connell taking the title while Jörg Bergmeister and Wolf Henzler likewise secured the GT2 drivers championship. It was O'Connell's fourth GT1 title and Bergmeisters third GT2 title.

== Schedule ==
Rnd	Race	Length	Circuit	Location	Date
1	(United States) Mobil 1 12 Hours of Sebring	12 Hours	Sebring International Raceway	Sebring, Florida	March 15
2	(United States) Acura Sports Car Challenge of St. Petersburg	1 Hour 55 Minutes	St. Petersburg Street Circuit	St. Petersburg, Florida	April 5
3	(United States) Tequila Patrón American Le Mans Series at Long Beach	1 Hour 40 Minutes	Long Beach Street Circuit	Long Beach, California	April 19
C	(United States) Lone Star Grand Prix	2 Hours 45 Minutes	Reliant Park	Houston, Texas	April 26
4	(United States) Larry H. Miller Dealerships Utah Grand Prix	2 Hours 45 Minutes	Miller Motorsports Park	Grantsville, Utah	May 18
5	(United States) Northeast Grand Prix	2 Hours 45 Minutes	Lime Rock Park	Lakeville, Connecticut	July 12
6	(United States) Acura Sports Car Challenge of Mid-Ohio	2 Hours 45 Minutes	Mid-Ohio Sports Car Course	Lexington, Ohio	July 19
7	(United States) Generac 500 at Road America	4 Hours	Road America	Elkhart Lake, Wisconsin	August 9
8	(Canada) Grand Prix of Mosport	2 Hours 45 Minutes	Mosport International Raceway	Bowmanville, Ontario	August 24
9	(United States) Detroit Sports Car Challenge	2 Hours 45 Minutes	Belle Isle Street Circuit	Detroit, Michigan	August 30
10	(United States) Petit Le Mans	1000 Miles or 10 Hours	Road Atlanta	Braselton, Georgia	October 4
11	(United States) Monterey Sports Car Championships	4 Hours	Mazda Raceway Laguna Seca	Monterey, California	October 18

The schedule initially consisted of the same 12 races as the previous season. The Lone Star Grand Prix was originally scheduled to take place on April 26. However, following the merger of the Champ Car World Series and Indy Racing League, the Champ Car Grand Prix of Houston event was initially cancelled. The American Le Mans Series race, as well as the support races, were later cancelled on March 3.

== Entry list ==
=== Le Mans Prototype 1 (LMP1) ===
Team	Chassis	Engine	Tyre	No.	Drivers	Rnds.
(France) Equipe Peugeot Total	Peugeot 908 HDi FAP	Peugeot HDi 5.5 L Turbo V12 (Diesel)	M	07	(France) Nicolas Minassian	1, 10
(France) Equipe Peugeot Total	Peugeot 908 HDi FAP	Peugeot HDi 5.5 L Turbo V12 (Diesel)	M	07	(France) Stéphane Sarrazin	1, 10
(France) Equipe Peugeot Total	Peugeot 908 HDi FAP	Peugeot HDi 5.5 L Turbo V12 (Diesel)	M	07	(Portugal) Pedro Lamy	1
(France) Equipe Peugeot Total	Peugeot 908 HDi FAP	Peugeot HDi 5.5 L Turbo V12 (Diesel)	M	07	(Austria) Christian Klien	10
(France) Equipe Peugeot Total	Peugeot 908 HDi FAP	Peugeot HDi 5.5 L Turbo V12 (Diesel)	M	08	(France) Stéphane Sarrazin	10*
(France) Equipe Peugeot Total	Peugeot 908 HDi FAP	Peugeot HDi 5.5 L Turbo V12 (Diesel)	M	08	(Portugal) Pedro Lamy	10*
(France) Equipe Peugeot Total	Peugeot 908 HDi FAP	Peugeot HDi 5.5 L Turbo V12 (Diesel)	M	08	(Austria) Alexander Wurz	10*
(United States) Audi Sport North America	Audi R10 TDI	Audi TDI 5.5L Turbo V12 (Diesel)	M	1	(Italy) Rinaldo Capello	1, 5–6, 8, 10
(United States) Audi Sport North America	Audi R10 TDI	Audi TDI 5.5L Turbo V12 (Diesel)	M	1	(United Kingdom) Allan McNish	1, 10
(United States) Audi Sport North America	Audi R10 TDI	Audi TDI 5.5L Turbo V12 (Diesel)	M	1	(Denmark) Tom Kristensen	1
(United States) Audi Sport North America	Audi R10 TDI	Audi TDI 5.5L Turbo V12 (Diesel)	M	1	(Italy) Emanuele Pirro	2–11
(United States) Audi Sport North America	Audi R10 TDI	Audi TDI 5.5L Turbo V12 (Diesel)	M	1	(Germany) Frank Biela	2–4
(United States) Audi Sport North America	Audi R10 TDI	Audi TDI 5.5L Turbo V12 (Diesel)	M	1	(Switzerland) Marcel Fässler	7, 9
(United States) Audi Sport North America	Audi R10 TDI	Audi TDI 5.5L Turbo V12 (Diesel)	M	1	(Netherlands) Christijan Albers	11
(United States) Audi Sport North America	Audi R10 TDI	Audi TDI 5.5L Turbo V12 (Diesel)	M	2	(Germany) Marco Werner	All
(United States) Audi Sport North America	Audi R10 TDI	Audi TDI 5.5L Turbo V12 (Diesel)	M	2	(Germany) Lucas Luhr	All
(United States) Audi Sport North America	Audi R10 TDI	Audi TDI 5.5L Turbo V12 (Diesel)	M	2	(Germany) Mike Rockenfeller	1
(United Kingdom) ECO Racing	Radical SR10	ECO (AER) 5.0 L Turbo V10 (Diesel)	D	10	(United Kingdom) Ben Collins	1*, 10*
(United Kingdom) ECO Racing	Radical SR10	ECO (AER) 5.0 L Turbo V10 (Diesel)	D	10	(Finland) Harri Toivonen	1*, 10*
(United Kingdom) ECO Racing	Radical SR10	ECO (AER) 5.0 L Turbo V10 (Diesel)	D	10	(United Kingdom) Simon Wright	1*, 10*
(United Kingdom) ECO Racing	Radical SR10	ECO (AER) 5.0 L Turbo V10 (Diesel)	D	10	(Japan) Hideki Noda	11
(United Kingdom) ECO Racing	Radical SR10	ECO (AER) 5.0 L Turbo V10 (Diesel)	D	10	(United States) Andrew Prendeville	11
(United States) Autocon Motorsports	Creation CA06/H(1, 3, 6-8) Lola B06/10(11-12)	Judd GV5 S2 5.0L V10(1, 3, 6-8) AER P32C 4.0L Turbo V8(11-12)	D	12	(United States) Chris McMurry	1, 3, 6–8, 10–11
(United States) Autocon Motorsports	Creation CA06/H(1, 3, 6-8) Lola B06/10(11-12)	Judd GV5 S2 5.0L V10(1, 3, 6-8) AER P32C 4.0L Turbo V8(11-12)	D	12	(Canada) Tony Burgess	1, 8, 10–11
(United States) Autocon Motorsports	Creation CA06/H(1, 3, 6-8) Lola B06/10(11-12)	Judd GV5 S2 5.0L V10(1, 3, 6-8) AER P32C 4.0L Turbo V8(11-12)	D	12	(United States) Bryan Willman	1, 6–7, 10
(United States) Autocon Motorsports	Creation CA06/H(1, 3, 6-8) Lola B06/10(11-12)	Judd GV5 S2 5.0L V10(1, 3, 6-8) AER P32C 4.0L Turbo V8(11-12)	D	12	(United States) Michael Lewis	3, 7
(United States) Autocon Motorsports	Creation CA06/H(1, 3, 6-8) Lola B06/10(11-12)	Judd GV5 S2 5.0L V10(1, 3, 6-8) AER P32C 4.0L Turbo V8(11-12)	D	12	(United States) Tomy Drissi	3*
(United States) Intersport Racing	Lola B06/10(6-8) Lola B07/17 (10)	AER P32C 3.6 L Turbo V8(6-8) Judd GV5.5 S2 5.5 L V10 (10)	K	30	(United States) Ryan Lewis	6–8, 10
(United States) Intersport Racing	Lola B06/10(6-8) Lola B07/17 (10)	AER P32C 3.6 L Turbo V8(6-8) Judd GV5.5 S2 5.5 L V10 (10)	K	30	(United States) John Faulkner	6–8
(United States) Intersport Racing	Lola B06/10(6-8) Lola B07/17 (10)	AER P32C 3.6 L Turbo V8(6-8) Judd GV5.5 S2 5.5 L V10 (10)	K	30	(United Kingdom) Gregor Fisken	7
(United States) Intersport Racing	Lola B06/10(6-8) Lola B07/17 (10)	AER P32C 3.6 L Turbo V8(6-8) Judd GV5.5 S2 5.5 L V10 (10)	K	30	(United Kingdom) Luke Hines	10
(United States) Intersport Racing	Lola B06/10(6-8) Lola B07/17 (10)	AER P32C 3.6 L Turbo V8(6-8) Judd GV5.5 S2 5.5 L V10 (10)	K	30	(France) Georges Forgeois	10
(United States) Intersport Racing	Lola B06/10	AER P32C 4.0L Turbo V8 (E85 ethanol)	D	37	(United States) Jon Field	All
(United States) Intersport Racing	Lola B06/10	AER P32C 4.0L Turbo V8 (E85 ethanol)	D	37	(United States) Clint Field	All
(United States) Intersport Racing	Lola B06/10	AER P32C 4.0L Turbo V8 (E85 ethanol)	D	37	(United States) Richard Berry	All
(United States) Corsa Motorsports	Zytek 07S	Zytek 2ZG408 4.0L V8	D	48	(United Kingdom) Johnny Mowlem	10–11
(United States) Corsa Motorsports	Zytek 07S	Zytek 2ZG408 4.0L V8	D	48	(Sweden) Stefan Johansson	10–11
(United States) Corsa Motorsports	Zytek 07S	Zytek 2ZG408 4.0L V8	D	48	(United States) Gunnar Jeannette	10
(United Kingdom) Team LNT (United States) Conquest Racing	Ginetta-Zytek 07S	Zytek ZJ458 4.5L V8	M	50	(United Kingdom) Danny Watts	10
(United Kingdom) Team LNT (United States) Conquest Racing	Ginetta-Zytek 07S	Zytek ZJ458 4.5L V8	M	50	(France) Olivier Pla	10
(United Kingdom) Creation Autosportif	Creation CA07	AIM (Judd) YS5.5 5.5 L V10 (E85 ethanol)	D	88	(South Africa) Stephen Simpson	10–11
(United Kingdom) Creation Autosportif	Creation CA07	AIM (Judd) YS5.5 5.5 L V10 (E85 ethanol)	D	88	(United Kingdom) Jamie Campbell-Walter	10–11
(United Kingdom) Creation Autosportif	Creation CA07	AIM (Judd) YS5.5 5.5 L V10 (E85 ethanol)	D	88	(Switzerland) Harold Primat	10
(United Kingdom) Creation Autosportif	Creation CA07	AIM (Judd) YS5.5 5.5 L V10 (E85 ethanol)	D	88	(United States) Liz Halliday	11
(United Kingdom) Creation Autosportif	Creation CA07	AIM (Judd) YS5.5 5.5 L V10 (E85 ethanol)	D	888	(United Kingdom) Stuart Hall	10
(United Kingdom) Creation Autosportif	Creation CA07	AIM (Judd) YS5.5 5.5 L V10 (E85 ethanol)	D	888	(United States) Liz Halliday	10
(United Kingdom) Creation Autosportif	Creation CA07	AIM (Judd) YS5.5 5.5 L V10 (E85 ethanol)	D	888	(Canada) Dean Stirling	10

=== Le Mans Prototype 2 (LMP2) ===
Team	Chassis	Engine	Tyre	No.	Drivers	Rnds.
(United States) Penske Racing	Porsche RS Spyder Evo	Porsche MR6 3.4L V8	M	5	(Australia) Ryan Briscoe	10–11
(United States) Penske Racing	Porsche RS Spyder Evo	Porsche MR6 3.4L V8	M	5	(Brazil) Hélio Castroneves	10–11
(United States) Penske Racing	Porsche RS Spyder Evo	Porsche MR6 3.4L V8	M	6	(United States) Patrick Long	All
(United States) Penske Racing	Porsche RS Spyder Evo	Porsche MR6 3.4L V8	M	6	(Germany) Sascha Maassen	1–8, 10–11
(United States) Penske Racing	Porsche RS Spyder Evo	Porsche MR6 3.4L V8	M	6	(Australia) Ryan Briscoe	1, 9
(United States) Penske Racing	Porsche RS Spyder Evo	Porsche MR6 3.4L V8	M	7	(Germany) Timo Bernhard	All
(United States) Penske Racing	Porsche RS Spyder Evo	Porsche MR6 3.4L V8	M	7	(France) Romain Dumas	All
(United States) Penske Racing	Porsche RS Spyder Evo	Porsche MR6 3.4L V8	M	7	(France) Emmanuel Collard	1
(United States) B-K Motorsports (Japan) Mazdaspeed	Lola B07/46(1-9) Lola B08/86(10-11)	Mazda MZR-R 2.0 L Turbo I4 (E85 ethanol)	Y D	8	(United Kingdom) Ben Devlin	All
(United States) B-K Motorsports (Japan) Mazdaspeed	Lola B07/46(1-9) Lola B08/86(10-11)	Mazda MZR-R 2.0 L Turbo I4 (E85 ethanol)	Y D	8	(United States) Gerardo Bonilla	All
(United States) B-K Motorsports (Japan) Mazdaspeed	Lola B07/46(1-9) Lola B08/86(10-11)	Mazda MZR-R 2.0 L Turbo I4 (E85 ethanol)	Y D	8	(Brazil) Raphael Matos	1, 11*
(United States) Patrón Highcroft Racing	Acura ARX-01B	Acura AL7R 3.4 L V8	M	9	(Australia) David Brabham	All
(United States) Patrón Highcroft Racing	Acura ARX-01B	Acura AL7R 3.4 L V8	M	9	(United States) Scott Sharp	All
(United States) Patrón Highcroft Racing	Acura ARX-01B	Acura AL7R 3.4 L V8	M	9	(Sweden) Stefan Johansson	1
(United States) Patrón Highcroft Racing	Acura ARX-01B	Acura AL7R 3.4 L V8	M	9	(United Kingdom) Dario Franchitti	10
(Mexico) Lowe's Fernández Racing	Acura ARX-01B	Acura AL7R 3.4 L V8	M	15	(Mexico) Adrian Fernandez	All
(Mexico) Lowe's Fernández Racing	Acura ARX-01B	Acura AL7R 3.4 L V8	M	15	(Mexico) Luis Diaz	All
(Mexico) Lowe's Fernández Racing	Acura ARX-01B	Acura AL7R 3.4 L V8	M	15	(Mexico) Michel Jourdain Jr.	10
(United States) Dyson Racing Team	Porsche RS Spyder Evo	Porsche MR6 3.4L V8	M	16	(United States) Chris Dyson	All
(United States) Dyson Racing Team	Porsche RS Spyder Evo	Porsche MR6 3.4L V8	M	16	(United Kingdom) Guy Smith	All
(United States) Dyson Racing Team	Porsche RS Spyder Evo	Porsche MR6 3.4L V8	M	20	(United Kingdom) Marino Franchitti	All
(United States) Dyson Racing Team	Porsche RS Spyder Evo	Porsche MR6 3.4L V8	M	20	(United States) Butch Leitzinger	All
(United States) Dyson Racing Team	Porsche RS Spyder Evo	Porsche MR6 3.4L V8	M	20	(United States) Andy Lally	1, 10
(United States) Van der Steur Racing	Radical SR9	AER P07 2.0L Turbo I4	K	19	(United States) Adam Pecorari	2
(United States) Van der Steur Racing	Radical SR9	AER P07 2.0L Turbo I4	K	19	(United States) Gunnar van der Steur	2
(United States) Andretti Green Racing	Acura ARX-01B	Acura AL7R 3.4 L V8	M	26	(United States) Bryan Herta	1–4
(United States) Andretti Green Racing	Acura ARX-01B	Acura AL7R 3.4 L V8	M	26	(Brazil) Christian Fittipaldi	1–4
(United States) Andretti Green Racing	Acura ARX-01B	Acura AL7R 3.4 L V8	M	26	(United States) Marco Andretti	1, 5, 10
(United States) Andretti Green Racing	Acura ARX-01B	Acura AL7R 3.4 L V8	M	26	(France) Franck Montagny	5–11
(United States) Andretti Green Racing	Acura ARX-01B	Acura AL7R 3.4 L V8	M	26	(Brazil) Raphael Matos	6
(United States) Andretti Green Racing	Acura ARX-01B	Acura AL7R 3.4 L V8	M	26	(United Kingdom) James Rossiter	7–9
(United States) Andretti Green Racing	Acura ARX-01B	Acura AL7R 3.4 L V8	M	26	(Brazil) Tony Kanaan	10–11
(Switzerland) Horag Lista Racing	Porsche RS Spyder Evo	Porsche MR6 3.4L V8	M	27	(Switzerland) Fredy Lienhard	1
(Switzerland) Horag Lista Racing	Porsche RS Spyder Evo	Porsche MR6 3.4L V8	M	27	(Belgium) Didier Theys	1
(Switzerland) Horag Lista Racing	Porsche RS Spyder Evo	Porsche MR6 3.4L V8	M	27	(Netherlands) Jan Lammers	1
(France) Barazi-Epsilon	Zytek 07S/2	Zytek ZG348 3.4 L V8	M	32	(Denmark) Juan Barazi	1
(France) Barazi-Epsilon	Zytek 07S/2	Zytek ZG348 3.4 L V8	M	32	(Netherlands) Michael Vergers	1
(France) Barazi-Epsilon	Zytek 07S/2	Zytek ZG348 3.4 L V8	M	32	(France) Jean-Christophe Ravier	1
(United States) de Ferran Motorsport	Acura ARX-01B	Acura AL7R 3.4 L V8	M	66	(Brazil) Gil de Ferran	4–11
(United States) de Ferran Motorsport	Acura ARX-01B	Acura AL7R 3.4 L V8	M	66	(France) Simon Pagenaud	4–11
(United States) de Ferran Motorsport	Acura ARX-01B	Acura AL7R 3.4 L V8	M	66	(New Zealand) Scott Dixon	10

=== Grand Touring 1 (GT1) ===
Team	Chassis	Engine	Tyre	No.	Drivers	Rnds.
(United States) Bell Motorsports	Aston Martin DBR9	Aston Martin 6.0 L V12	D	008	(United States) Terry Borcheller	1–2, 5, 7–9
(United States) Bell Motorsports	Aston Martin DBR9	Aston Martin 6.0 L V12	D	008	(United States) Chapman Ducote	1–2, 5, 7–9
(United States) Bell Motorsports	Aston Martin DBR9	Aston Martin 6.0 L V12	D	008	(Spain) Antonio García	1
(United States) Corvette Racing	Chevrolet Corvette C6.R	Chevrolet LS7.r 7.0L V8	M	3	(United States) Johnny O'Connell	All
(United States) Corvette Racing	Chevrolet Corvette C6.R	Chevrolet LS7.r 7.0L V8	M	3	(Denmark) Jan Magnussen	All
(United States) Corvette Racing	Chevrolet Corvette C6.R	Chevrolet LS7.r 7.0L V8	M	3	(Canada) Ron Fellows	1, 10
(United States) Corvette Racing	Chevrolet Corvette C6.R	Chevrolet LS7.r 7.0L V8	M	4	(United Kingdom) Oliver Gavin	All
(United States) Corvette Racing	Chevrolet Corvette C6.R	Chevrolet LS7.r 7.0L V8	M	4	(Monaco) Olivier Beretta	All
(United States) Corvette Racing	Chevrolet Corvette C6.R	Chevrolet LS7.r 7.0L V8	M	4	(Italy) Max Papis	1, 10

=== Grand Touring 2 (GT2) ===
Team	Chassis	Engine	Tyre	No.	Drivers	Rnds.
(United Kingdom) Drayson-Barwell	Aston Martin DBRS9(1-2) Aston Martin V8 Vantage GT2(3-11)	Aston Martin 6.0 L V12 (E85 ethanol)(1-2) Aston Martin 4.5 L V8 (E85 ethanol)(3-11)	D	007	(United Kingdom) Paul Drayson	All
(United Kingdom) Drayson-Barwell	Aston Martin DBRS9(1-2) Aston Martin V8 Vantage GT2(3-11)	Aston Martin 6.0 L V12 (E85 ethanol)(1-2) Aston Martin 4.5 L V8 (E85 ethanol)(3-11)	D	007	(United Kingdom) Jonathan Cocker	All
(United Kingdom) Drayson-Barwell	Aston Martin DBRS9(1-2) Aston Martin V8 Vantage GT2(3-11)	Aston Martin 6.0 L V12 (E85 ethanol)(1-2) Aston Martin 4.5 L V8 (E85 ethanol)(3-11)	D	007	(United Kingdom) Tim Sugden	1
(United Kingdom) Drayson-Barwell	Aston Martin DBRS9(1-2) Aston Martin V8 Vantage GT2(3-11)	Aston Martin 6.0 L V12 (E85 ethanol)(1-2) Aston Martin 4.5 L V8 (E85 ethanol)(3-11)	D	007	(United Kingdom) Darren Turner	10
(Germany) VICI Racing	Porsche 997 GT3-RSR	Porsche 3.8L Flat-6	K	5	(United States) Craig Stanton	1–4
(Germany) VICI Racing	Porsche 997 GT3-RSR	Porsche 3.8L Flat-6	K	5	(United States) Nathan Swartzbaugh	1–4
(Germany) VICI Racing	Porsche 997 GT3-RSR	Porsche 3.8L Flat-6	K	5	(Germany) Uwe Alzen	1
(Germany) VICI Racing	Porsche 997 GT3-RSR	Porsche 3.8L Flat-6	K	5	(Brazil) Ruben Carrapatoso	2
(Germany) VICI Racing	Porsche 997 GT3-RSR	Porsche 3.8L Flat-6	K	18	(Netherlands) Nicky Pastorelli	4, 6–11
(Germany) VICI Racing	Porsche 997 GT3-RSR	Porsche 3.8L Flat-6	K	18	(Brazil) Ruben Carrapatoso	4
(Germany) VICI Racing	Porsche 997 GT3-RSR	Porsche 3.8L Flat-6	K	18	(Netherlands) Francisco Pastorelli	6–11
(Germany) VICI Racing	Porsche 997 GT3-RSR	Porsche 3.8L Flat-6	K	18	(Germany) Marc Basseng	7–11
(United States) Primetime Race Group	Dodge Viper Competition Coupe	Dodge 8.3L V10	M	11	(United States) Joel Feinberg	All
(United States) Primetime Race Group	Dodge Viper Competition Coupe	Dodge 8.3L V10	M	11	(United States) Chris Hall	All
(United States) Panoz Team PTG	Panoz Esperante GT-LM	Ford (Elan) 5.0 L V8	Y	21	(United States) Tommy Milner	All
(United States) Panoz Team PTG	Panoz Esperante GT-LM	Ford (Elan) 5.0 L V8	Y	21	(United States) Tom Sutherland	1–6, 8–9
(United States) Panoz Team PTG	Panoz Esperante GT-LM	Ford (Elan) 5.0 L V8	Y	21	(United States) Joey Hand	1, 7, 10–11
(United States) LG Motorsports	Chevrolet Corvette C6	Chevrolet LS3 6.0 L V8	K D	28	(United States) Lou Gigliotti	1–4, 10
(United States) LG Motorsports	Chevrolet Corvette C6	Chevrolet LS3 6.0 L V8	K D	28	(United States) Doug Peterson	1–3, 10
(United States) LG Motorsports	Chevrolet Corvette C6	Chevrolet LS3 6.0 L V8	K D	28	(Belgium) Marc Goossens	1, 10
(United States) LG Motorsports	Chevrolet Corvette C6	Chevrolet LS3 6.0 L V8	K D	28	(United States) Eric Curran	4
(United States) LG Motorsports	Chevrolet Corvette C6	Chevrolet LS3 6.0 L V8	K D	28	(United States) Tomy Drissi	10
(United States) Robertson Racing	Ford GT-R Mk. VII	Ford Cammer 5.0 L V8	D	40	(United States) David Murry	All
(United States) Robertson Racing	Ford GT-R Mk. VII	Ford Cammer 5.0 L V8	D	40	(United States) Andrea Robertson	1–2, 4–11
(United States) Robertson Racing	Ford GT-R Mk. VII	Ford Cammer 5.0 L V8	D	40	(United States) David Robertson	1, 3–11
(United States) Flying Lizard Motorsports	Porsche 997 GT3-RSR	Porsche 3.8L Flat-6	M	44	(United States) Seth Neiman	1–8, 10–11
(United States) Flying Lizard Motorsports	Porsche 997 GT3-RSR	Porsche 3.8L Flat-6	M	44	(United States) Darren Law	1–2, 4–5, 7, 10–11
(United States) Flying Lizard Motorsports	Porsche 997 GT3-RSR	Porsche 3.8L Flat-6	M	44	(Australia) Alex Davison	1
(United States) Flying Lizard Motorsports	Porsche 997 GT3-RSR	Porsche 3.8L Flat-6	M	44	(United States) Lonnie Pechnik	3, 6, 8–10
(United States) Flying Lizard Motorsports	Porsche 997 GT3-RSR	Porsche 3.8L Flat-6	M	44	(Austria) Martin Ragginger	9
(United States) Flying Lizard Motorsports	Porsche 997 GT3-RSR	Porsche 3.8L Flat-6	M	45	(Germany) Wolf Henzler	All
(United States) Flying Lizard Motorsports	Porsche 997 GT3-RSR	Porsche 3.8L Flat-6	M	45	(Germany) Jörg Bergmeister	All
(United States) Flying Lizard Motorsports	Porsche 997 GT3-RSR	Porsche 3.8L Flat-6	M	45	(Germany) Marc Lieb	1, 10
(United States) Flying Lizard Motorsports	Porsche 997 GT3-RSR	Porsche 3.8L Flat-6	M	46	(United States) Johannes van Overbeek	All
(United States) Flying Lizard Motorsports	Porsche 997 GT3-RSR	Porsche 3.8L Flat-6	M	46	(France) Patrick Pilet	All
(United States) Flying Lizard Motorsports	Porsche 997 GT3-RSR	Porsche 3.8L Flat-6	M	46	(Austria) Richard Lietz	1
(United States) Corsa Motorsport	Ferrari F430 GTC	Ferrari F136 GT 4.0L V8	D	48	(United States) Gunnar Jeannette	1–4
(United States) Corsa Motorsport	Ferrari F430 GTC	Ferrari F136 GT 4.0L V8	D	48	(United Kingdom) Johnny Mowlem	1–4
(United States) Corsa Motorsport	Ferrari F430 GTC	Ferrari F136 GT 4.0L V8	D	48	(Germany) Ralf Kelleners	1
(United States) Black Swan Racing	Ford GT-R Mk. VII	Ford Cammer 5.0 L V8	F	54	(United States) Tim Pappas	5–7, 9–11
(United States) Black Swan Racing	Ford GT-R Mk. VII	Ford Cammer 5.0 L V8	F	54	(United States) Anthony Lazzaro	5–7, 9–11
(United States) Black Swan Racing	Ford GT-R Mk. VII	Ford Cammer 5.0 L V8	F	54	(United States) Andy Pilgrim	10
(United States) Risi Competizione	Ferrari F430 GTC	Ferrari F136 GT 4.0L V8	M	61	(Sweden) Niclas Jönsson	1, 10–11
(United States) Risi Competizione	Ferrari F430 GTC	Ferrari F136 GT 4.0L V8	M	61	(United States) Tracy Krohn	1, 10–11
(United States) Risi Competizione	Ferrari F430 GTC	Ferrari F136 GT 4.0L V8	M	61	(Belgium) Eric van de Poele	1, 10
(United States) Risi Competizione	Ferrari F430 GTC	Ferrari F136 GT 4.0L V8	M	61	(United States) Harrison Brix	2–7, 9
(United States) Risi Competizione	Ferrari F430 GTC	Ferrari F136 GT 4.0L V8	M	61	(Austria) Patrick Friesacher	2–6
(United States) Risi Competizione	Ferrari F430 GTC	Ferrari F136 GT 4.0L V8	M	61	(United Kingdom) Robert Bell	7, 9
(United States) Risi Competizione	Ferrari F430 GTC	Ferrari F136 GT 4.0L V8	M	62	(Brazil) Jaime Melo	All
(United States) Risi Competizione	Ferrari F430 GTC	Ferrari F136 GT 4.0L V8	M	62	(Finland) Mika Salo	All
(United States) Risi Competizione	Ferrari F430 GTC	Ferrari F136 GT 4.0L V8	M	62	(Italy) Gianmaria Bruni	1
(United States) Tafel Racing	Ferrari F430 GTC	Ferrari F136 GT 4.0L V8	M	71	(Germany) Dirk Müller	All
(United States) Tafel Racing	Ferrari F430 GTC	Ferrari F136 GT 4.0L V8	M	71	(Germany) Dominik Farnbacher	All
(United States) Tafel Racing	Ferrari F430 GTC	Ferrari F136 GT 4.0L V8	M	71	(United Kingdom) Robert Bell	1
(United States) Tafel Racing	Ferrari F430 GTC	Ferrari F136 GT 4.0L V8	M	73	(United States) Jim Tafel	1, 4–11
(United States) Tafel Racing	Ferrari F430 GTC	Ferrari F136 GT 4.0L V8	M	73	(Denmark) Allan Simonsen	1
(United States) Tafel Racing	Ferrari F430 GTC	Ferrari F136 GT 4.0L V8	M	73	(Germany) Pierre Ehret	1
(United States) Tafel Racing	Ferrari F430 GTC	Ferrari F136 GT 4.0L V8	M	73	(United States) Alex Figge	4–11
(United States) Tafel Racing	Ferrari F430 GTC	Ferrari F136 GT 4.0L V8	M	73	(United States) Harrison Brix	11
(Slovakia) Autoracing Club Bratislava	Porsche 996 GT3-R	Porsche 3.8 L Flat-6	D	77	(Slovakia) Miro Konôpka	1
(Slovakia) Autoracing Club Bratislava	Porsche 996 GT3-R	Porsche 3.8 L Flat-6	D	77	(Slovakia) Miroslav Hornak	1
(Slovakia) Autoracing Club Bratislava	Porsche 996 GT3-R	Porsche 3.8 L Flat-6	D	77	(Italy) Mauro Casadei	1
(United States) Farnbacher-Loles Motorsports	Porsche 997 GT3-RSR	Porsche 3.8 L Flat-6	M	87	(Germany) Marc Basseng	1–4
(United States) Farnbacher-Loles Motorsports	Porsche 997 GT3-RSR	Porsche 3.8 L Flat-6	M	87	(Germany) Dirk Werner	1–2, 4–8, 10–11
(United States) Farnbacher-Loles Motorsports	Porsche 997 GT3-RSR	Porsche 3.8 L Flat-6	M	87	(United States) Bryce Miller	1, 7, 10–11
(United States) Farnbacher-Loles Motorsports	Porsche 997 GT3-RSR	Porsche 3.8 L Flat-6	M	87	(Australia) Alex Davison	3
(United States) Farnbacher-Loles Motorsports	Porsche 997 GT3-RSR	Porsche 3.8 L Flat-6	M	87	(United Kingdom) Richard Westbrook	5–7
(United States) Farnbacher-Loles Motorsports	Porsche 997 GT3-RSR	Porsche 3.8 L Flat-6	M	87	(Germany) Pierre Kaffer	8
(United States) Farnbacher-Loles Motorsports	Porsche 997 GT3-RSR	Porsche 3.8 L Flat-6	M	87	(Germany) Jörg Hardt	10
(Monaco) JMB Racing (United Kingdom) Aucott Racing	Ferrari F430 GTC	Ferrari F136 GT 4.0L V8	D	99	(United Kingdom) Ben Aucott	10–11
(Monaco) JMB Racing (United Kingdom) Aucott Racing	Ferrari F430 GTC	Ferrari F136 GT 4.0L V8	D	99	(Germany) Pierre Kaffer	10–11
(Monaco) JMB Racing (United Kingdom) Aucott Racing	Ferrari F430 GTC	Ferrari F136 GT 4.0L V8	D	99	(France) Stéphane Daoudi	10

* Was on the entry list but did not participate in the event.

== Season results ==
Overall winner in bold.

Rnd	Circuit	LMP1 Winning Team	LMP2 Winning Team	GT1 Winning Team	GT2 Winning Team	Results
Rnd	Circuit	LMP1 Winning Drivers	LMP2 Winning Drivers	GT1 Winning Drivers	GT2 Winning Drivers	Results
1	Sebring	(United States) #1 Audi Sport North America	(United States) **#7 Penske Racing**	(United States) #3 Corvette Racing	(United States) #45 Flying Lizard Motorsports	Results
1	Sebring	(Italy) Rinaldo Capello (Denmark) Tom Kristensen (United Kingdom) Allan McNish	**(Germany) Timo Bernhard** **(France) Romain Dumas** **(France) Emmanuel Collard**	(United States) Johnny O'Connell (Denmark) Jan Magnussen (Canada) Ron Fellows	(Germany) Jörg Bergmeister (Germany) Wolf Henzler (Germany) Marc Lieb	Results
2	St. Petersburg	(United States) **#2 Audi Sport North America**	(United States) #7 Penske Racing	(United States) #4 Corvette Racing	(United States) #71 Tafel Racing	Results
2	St. Petersburg	**(Germany) Marco Werner** **(Germany) Lucas Luhr**	(Germany) Timo Bernhard (France) Romain Dumas	(Monaco) Olivier Beretta (United Kingdom) Oliver Gavin	(Germany) Dominik Farnbacher (Germany) Dirk Müller	Results
3	Long Beach	**(United States) #2 Audi Sport North America**	(United States) #9 Highcroft Racing	(United States) #3 Corvette Racing	(United States) #71 Tafel Racing	Results
3	Long Beach	**(Germany) Marco Werner** **(Germany) Lucas Luhr**	(Australia) David Brabham (United States) Scott Sharp	(United States) Johnny O'Connell (Denmark) Jan Magnussen	(Germany) Dominik Farnbacher (Germany) Dirk Müller	Results
4	Miller	(United States) #2 Audi Sport North America	**(United States) #7 Penske Racing**	(United States) #3 Corvette Racing	(United States) #45 Flying Lizard Motorsports	Results
4	Miller	(Germany) Marco Werner (Germany) Lucas Luhr	**(Germany) Timo Bernhard** **(France) Romain Dumas**	(United States) Johnny O'Connell (Denmark) Jan Magnussen	(Germany) Jörg Bergmeister (Germany) Wolf Henzler	Results
5	Lime Rock	(United States) #2 Audi Sport North America	**(United States) #9 Highcroft Racing**	(United States) #3 Corvette Racing	(United States) #45 Flying Lizard Motorsports	Results
5	Lime Rock	(Germany) Marco Werner (Germany) Lucas Luhr	**(Australia) David Brabham** **(United States) Scott Sharp**	(United States) Johnny O'Connell (Denmark) Jan Magnussen	(Germany) Jörg Bergmeister (Germany) Wolf Henzler	Results
6	Mid-Ohio	**(United States) #2 Audi Sport North America**	(United States) #7 Penske Racing	(United States) #3 Corvette Racing	(United States) #71 Tafel Racing	Results
6	Mid-Ohio	**(Germany) Marco Werner** **(Germany) Lucas Luhr**	(Germany) Timo Bernhard (France) Romain Dumas	(United States) Johnny O'Connell (Denmark) Jan Magnussen	(Germany) Dominik Farnbacher (Germany) Dirk Müller	Results
7	Road America	**(United States) #2 Audi Sport North America**	(United States) #9 Highcroft Racing	(United States) #3 Corvette Racing	(United States) #87 Farnbacher-Loles	Results
7	Road America	**(Germany) Marco Werner** **(Germany) Lucas Luhr**	(Australia) David Brabham (United States) Scott Sharp	(United States) Johnny O'Connell (Denmark) Jan Magnussen	(Germany) Dirk Werner (United Kingdom) Richard Westbrook (United States) Bryce Miller	Results
8	Mosport	**(United States) #2 Audi Sport North America**	(United States) #9 Highcroft Racing	(United States) #3 Corvette Racing	(United States) #62 Risi Competizione	Results
8	Mosport	**(Germany) Marco Werner** **(Germany) Lucas Luhr**	(Australia) David Brabham (United States) Scott Sharp	(United States) Johnny O'Connell (Denmark) Jan Magnussen	(Brazil) Jaime Melo (Finland) Mika Salo	Results
9	Belle Isle	(United States) #37 Intersport Racing	**(United States) #26 Andretti Green Racing**	(United States) #4 Corvette Racing	(United States) #45 Flying Lizard Motorsports	Results
9	Belle Isle	(United States) Jon Field (United States) Clint Field (United States) Richard Berry	**(France) Franck Montagny** **(United Kingdom) James Rossiter**	(Monaco) Olivier Beretta (United Kingdom) Oliver Gavin	(Germany) Jörg Bergmeister (Germany) Wolf Henzler	Results
10	Road Atlanta	**(United States) #1 Audi Sport North America**	(United States) #5 Penske Motorsports	(United States) #3 Corvette Racing	(United States) #62 Risi Competizione	Results
10	Road Atlanta	**(United Kingdom) Allan McNish** **(Italy) Rinaldo Capello** **(Italy) Emanuele Pirro**	(Australia) Ryan Briscoe (Brazil) Hélio Castroneves	(United States) Johnny O'Connell (Denmark) Jan Magnussen (Canada) Ron Fellows	(Brazil) Jaime Melo (Finland) Mika Salo	Results
11	Laguna Seca	**(United States) #2 Audi Sport North America**	(United States) #26 Andretti Green Racing	(United States) #4 Corvette Racing	(United States) #71 Tafel Racing	Results
11	Laguna Seca	**(Germany) Marco Werner** **(Germany) Lucas Luhr**	(France) Franck Montagny (Brazil) Tony Kanaan	(Monaco) Olivier Beretta (United Kingdom) Oliver Gavin	(Germany) Dominik Farnbacher (Germany) Dirk Müller	Results

== Championship results ==
For races under three hours, points are awarded to the top 10 finishers in the following order:

- 20-16-13-10-8-6-4-3-2-1

For races between four hours and eight hours, points are awarded in the following order:

- 25-21-18-15-13-11-9-8-7-6

For races longer than eight hours, points are awarded in the following order:

- 30-26-23-20-18-16-14-13-12-11

Cars failing to complete 70% of the winner's distance are not awarded points. Drivers failing to drive for at least 45 minutes in the race are not awarded points, with the exception of the Long Beach round where drivers need only 30 minutes minimum.

=== LMP1 Drivers' Championship ===
Pos.	Driver	Team	SEB (United States)	STP (United States)	LBH (United States)	UTA (United States)	LIM (United States)	MOH (United States)	ROA (United States)	MOS (Canada)	BEL (United States)	ATL (United States)	LAG (United States)	Pts.
1	(Germany) Marco Werner	(United States) Audi Sport North America	2	1	1	1	1	1	1	1	Ret	3	1	219
1	(Germany) Lucas Luhr	(United States) Audi Sport North America	2	1	1	1	1	1	1	1	Ret	3	1	219
2	(Italy) Emanuele Pirro	(United States) Audi Sport North America		2	2	3^{†}	3^{†}	2	2	2	DSQ	1	2	156
3	(United States) Richard Berry	(United States) Intersport Racing	3			2	2	Ret	3	Ret	1	Ret	5	106
4	(United States) Jon Field	(United States) Intersport Racing	3	Ret	4	2	2	Ret	3	Ret	1	Ret	5*	103
4	(United States) Clint Field	(United States) Intersport Racing	3	Ret	4	2	2	Ret	3	Ret	1	Ret		103
5	(Italy) Rinaldo Capello	(United States) Audi Sport North America	1				3^{†}	2		2		1		102
6	(United Kingdom) Allan McNish	(United States) Audi Sport North America	1									1		60
7	(France) Stéphane Sarrazin	(France) Equipe Peugeot Total	4									2		46
7	(France) Nicolas Minassian	(France) Equipe Peugeot Total	4									2		46
8	(Germany) Frank Biela	(United States) Audi Sport North America		2	2	3^{†}								42
9	(United States) Chris McMurry	(United States) Autocon Motorsports	5		3			4	Ret	Ret		Ret	Ret	41
9	(United States) Ryan Lewis	(United States) Intersport Racing						3	4	Ret		Ret	5	41
10	(Denmark) Tom Kristensen	(United States) Audi Sport North America	1											30
11	(United States) Bryan Willman	(United States) Autocon Motorsports	5					4	Ret			Ret		28
11	(United States) John Faulkner	(United States) Intersport Racing						3	4	Ret				28
12	(Austria) Christian Klien	(France) Equipe Peugeot Total										2		26
12	(Germany) Mike Rockenfeller	(United States) Audi Sport North America	2											26
13	(Switzerland) Marcel Fässler	(United States) Audi Sport North America							2		DSQ			21
13	(Netherlands) Christijan Albers	(United States) Audi Sport North America											2	21
14	(Portugal) Pedro Lamy	(France) Equipe Peugeot Total	4											20
14	(France) Olivier Pla	(United Kingdom) Team LNT										4		20
14	(United Kingdom) Danny Watts	(United Kingdom) Team LNT										4		20
15	(Canada) Tony Burgess	(United States) Autocon Motorsports	5							Ret		Ret	Ret	18
15	(United Kingdom) Johnny Mowlem	(United States) Corsa Motorsports										Ret	3	18
15	(Sweden) Stefan Johansson	(United States) Corsa Motorsports										Ret	3	18
15	(United States) Gunnar Jeannette	(United States) Corsa Motorsports										Ret	3	18
16	(United Kingdom) Gregor Fisken	(United States) Intersport Racing							4					15
16	(South Africa) Stephen Simpson	(United Kingdom) Creation Autosportif										Ret	4	15
16	(United Kingdom) Jamie Campbell-Walter	(United Kingdom) Creation Autosportif										Ret	4	15
16	(United States) Liz Halliday	(United Kingdom) Creation Autosportif										Ret	4	15
17	(United States) Michael Lewis	(United States) Autocon Motorsports			3				Ret					13
-	(United Kingdom) Luke Hines	(United States) Intersport Racing										Ret		0
-	(France) Georges Forgeois	(United States) Intersport Racing										Ret		0
-	(Switzerland) Harold Primat	(United Kingdom) Creation Autosportif										Ret		0
-	(United Kingdom) Stuart Hall	(United Kingdom) Creation Autosportif										Ret		0
-	(United Kingdom) Dean Stirling	(United Kingdom) Creation Autosportif										Ret		0
-	(Japan) Hideki Noda	(United Kingdom) ECO Racing										Ret		0
-	(United States) Andrew Prendeville	(United Kingdom) ECO Racing										Ret		0
-	(United Kingdom) Ben Collins	(United Kingdom) ECO Racing	DNP											0
-	(Finland) Harri Toivonen	(United Kingdom) ECO Racing	DNP											0
-	(United Kingdom) Simon Wright	(United Kingdom) ECO Racing	DNP											0
Pos.	Driver	Team	SEB (United States)	STP (United States)	LBH (United States)	UTA (United States)	LIM (United States)	MOH (United States)	ROA (United States)	MOS (Canada)	BEL (United States)	ATL (United States)	LAG (United States)	Pts.

† - Frank Biela and Emanuele Pirro were both penalized three championship points for their entry making avoidable contact during Round 4. Emanuele Pirro and Rinaldo Capello would also be penalized three championship points during Round 5.

=== LMP1 Teams Championship ===
Teams only scored points for their highest finishing entry in each race.

Pos.	Team	No.	SEB (United States)	STP (United States)	LBH (United States)	UTA (United States)	LIM (United States)	MOH (United States)	ROA (United States)	MOS (Canada)	BEL (United States)	ATL (United States)	LAG (United States)	Pts.
1	(United States) Audi Sport North America	1	1	2	2	3^{†}	3^{†}	2	2	2	DSQ	1	2	230
1	(United States) Audi Sport North America	2	2	1	1	1	1	1	1	1	Ret	3	1	230
2	(United States) Intersport Racing	30						3	4	Ret		Ret		129
2	(United States) Intersport Racing	37	3	Ret	4	2	2	Ret	3	Ret	1	Ret	5	129
3	(United States) Autocon Motorsports	12	5		3			4	Ret	Ret		Ret	Ret	41
NC	(France) Equipe Peugeot Total	07	4									2		0 (46)
NC	(United Kingdom) Team LNT	50										4		0 (20)
NC	(United States) Corsa Motorsports	48										Ret	3	0 (18)
NC	(United Kingdom) Creation Autosportif	88										Ret	4	0 (15)
NC	(United Kingdom) Creation Autosportif	888										Ret		0 (15)
NC	(United Kingdom) ECO Racing	10	DNP									Ret		0
Pos.	Team	No.	SEB (United States)	STP (United States)	LBH (United States)	UTA (United States)	LIM (United States)	MOH (United States)	ROA (United States)	MOS (Canada)	BEL (United States)	ATL (United States)	LAG (United States)	Pts.

=== LMP2 Drivers' Championship ===
Pos.	Driver	Team	SEB (United States)	STP (United States)	LBH (United States)	UTA (United States)	LIM (United States)	MOH (United States)	ROA (United States)	MOS (Canada)	BEL (United States)	ATL (United States)	LAG (United States)	Pts.
1	(Germany) Timo Bernhard	(United States) DHL Penske Racing	1	1	2	1	2	1	2	6	4	2	3	203
1	(France) Romain Dumas	(United States) DHL Penske Racing	1	1	2	1	2	1	2	6	4	2	3	203
2	(United States) Scott Sharp	(United States) Patrón Highcroft Racing	4	2	1	9	1	2	1	1	2	Ret	9	162
2	(Australia) David Brabham	(United States) Patrón Highcroft Racing	4	2	1	9	1	2	1	1	2	Ret	9	162
3	(United States) Patrick Long	(United States) DHL Penske Racing	Ret	3^{†}	3	2	3	4	4	3	5	3	8	129
4	(Germany) Sascha Maassen	(United States) DHL Penske Racing	Ret	3^{†}	3	2	3	4	4	3		3	8	121
5	(United States) Butch Leitzinger	(United States) Dyson Racing	2	9	5	4	6	6	3	8	8	7	6	113
5	(United Kingdom) Marino Franchitti	(United States) Dyson Racing	2	9	5	4	6	6	3	8	8	7	6	113
6	(United States) Chris Dyson	(United States) Dyson Racing	3	4	7	6	Ret	5	6	7	6	6	5	101
6	(United Kingdom) Guy Smith	(United States) Dyson Racing	3	4	7	6	Ret	5	6	7	6	6	5	101
7	(France) Franck Montagny	(United States) Andretti Green Racing					5	7	7	4	1	4	1	90
8	(Mexico) Adrián Fernández	(Mexico) Lowe's Fernández Racing	DSQ	7	6	5	4	3	9	2	9	8	7	88
8	(Mexico) Luis Díaz	(Mexico) Lowe's Fernández Racing	DSQ	7	6	5	4	3	9	2	9	8	7	88
9	(Brazil) Gil de Ferran	(United States) de Ferran Motorsports				3	7	Ret	8	5	3	5	2	85
9	(France) Simon Pagenaud	(United States) de Ferran Motorsports				3	7	Ret	8	5	3	5	2	85
10	(Australia) Ryan Briscoe	(United States) DHL Penske Racing	Ret								5	1	4	53
10	(France) Emmanuel Collard	(United States) DHL Penske Racing	1									3		53
11	(United States) Andy Lally	(United States) Dyson Racing	2									7		46
12	(Brazil) Hélio Castroneves	(United States) DHL Penske Racing										1	4	45
13	(United States) Gerardo Bonilla	(United States) B-K Motorsport	DSQ	6	8	8	Ret	8	5	9	7	DNS	10	40
13	(United Kingdom) Ben Devlin	(United States) B-K Motorsport	DSQ	6	8	8	Ret	8	5	9	7	DNS	10	40
14	(Brazil) Tony Kanaan	(United States) Andretti Green Racing										4	1	39
14	(United Kingdom) James Rossiter	(United States) Andretti Green Racing							7	4	1			39
15	(United States) Bryan Herta	(United States) Andretti Green Racing	6	5	4	7								38
15	(Brazil) Christian Fittipaldi	(United States) Andretti Green Racing	6	5	4	7								38
15	(United States) Marco Andretti	(United States) Andretti Green Racing	6				5					4		38
16	(Sweden) Stefan Johansson	(United States) Patrón Highcroft Racing	4											20
17	(Belgium) Didier Theys	(Switzerland) Horag Lista Racing	5											18
17	(Switzerland) Fredy Lienhard	(Switzerland) Horag Lista Racing	5											18
17	(Netherlands) Jan Lammers	(Switzerland) Horag Lista Racing	5											18
17	(New Zealand) Scott Dixon	(United States) de Ferran Motorsports										5		18
18	(Mexico) Michel Jourdain Jr.	(Mexico) Lowe's Fernández Racing										8		13
19	(Brazil) Raphael Matos	(United States) B-K Motorsport	DSQ											4
19	(Brazil) Raphael Matos	(United States) Andretti Green Racing						7						4
20	(United States) Gunnar van der Steur	(United States) Van der Steur Racing		8										3
20	(United States) Robbie Pecorari	(United States) Van der Steur Racing		8										3
-	(Netherlands) Michael Vergers	(France) Barazi Epsilon	Ret											0
-	(France) Barazi Epsilon	(France) Barazi Epsilon	Ret											0
-	(Denmark) Juan Barazi	(France) Barazi Epsilon	Ret											0
-	(United Kingdom) Dario Franchitti	(United States) Patrón Highcroft Racing										Ret		0
Pos.	Driver	Team	SEB (United States)	STP (United States)	LBH (United States)	UTA (United States)	LIM (United States)	MOH (United States)	ROA (United States)	MOS (Canada)	BEL (United States)	ATL (United States)	LAG (United States)	Pts.

† - Sascha Maassen and Patrick Long were both penalized three championship points for their entry making avoidable contact during Round 2.

=== LMP2 Teams Championship ===
Teams only scored points for their highest finishing entry in each race.

Pos.	Team	No.	SEB (United States)	STP (United States)	LBH (United States)	UTA (United States)	LIM (United States)	MOH (United States)	ROA (United States)	MOS (Canada)	BEL (United States)	ATL (United States)	LAG (United States)	Pts.
1	(United States) DHL Penske Racing	6	Ret	3^{†}	3	2	3	4	4	3	5	3	8	210
1	(United States) DHL Penske Racing	7	1	1	2	1	2	1	2	6	4	2	3	210
2	(United States) Patrón Highcroft Racing	9	4	2	1	9	1	2	1	1	2	Ret	9	162
3	(United States) Dyson Racing	16	3	4	7	6	Ret	5	6	7	6	6	5	129
3	(United States) Dyson Racing	20	2	9	5	4	6	6	3	8	8	7	6	129
4	(United States) Andretti Green Racing	26	6	5	4	7	5	7	7	4	1	4	1	128
5	(Mexico) Lowe's Fernández Racing	15	DSQ	7	6	5	4	3	9	2	9	8	7	88
6	(United States) de Ferran Motorsports	66				3	7	Ret	8	5	3	5	2	85
7	(United States) B-K Motorsport	8	DSQ	6	8	8	Ret	8	5	9	7	DNS	10	45
NC	(United States) DHL Penske Racing	5										1	4	40
NC	(Switzerland) Horag Lista Racing	27	5											0 (18)
NC	(United States) Van der Steur Racing	19		8										0 (3)
NC	(France) Barazi Epsilon	32	Ret											0
Pos.	Team	No.	SEB (United States)	STP (United States)	LBH (United States)	UTA (United States)	LIM (United States)	MOH (United States)	ROA (United States)	MOS (Canada)	BEL (United States)	ATL (United States)	LAG (United States)	Pts.

=== GT1 Drivers' Championship ===
Pos.	Driver	Team	SEB (United States)	STP (United States)	LBH (United States)	UTA (United States)	LIM (United States)	MOH (United States)	ROA (United States)	MOS (Canada)	BEL (United States)	ATL (United States)	LAG (United States)	Pts.
1	(Denmark) Jan Magnussen	(United States) Corvette Racing	1	2	1	1	1	1	1	1	2	1	2	238
1	(United States) Johnny O'Connell	(United States) Corvette Racing	1	2	1	1	1	1	1	1	2	1	2	238
2	(United Kingdom) Oliver Gavin	(United States) Corvette Racing	2	1	2	2	2	2	3	2	1	2	1	215
2	(Monaco) Olivier Beretta	(United States) Corvette Racing	2	1	2	2	2	2	3	2	1	2	1	215
3	(United States) Chapman Ducote	(United States) Bell Motorsports	3	Ret			Ret		2	3	3			70
3	(United States) Terry Borcheller	(United States) Bell Motorsports	3	Ret			Ret		2	3	3			70
4	(Canada) Ron Fellows	(United States) Corvette Racing	1									1		60
5	(Italy) Max Papis	(United States) Corvette Racing	2									2		52
6	(Spain) Antonio García	(United States) Bell Motorsports	3											23
Pos.	Driver	Team	SEB (United States)	STP (United States)	LBH (United States)	UTA (United States)	LIM (United States)	MOH (United States)	ROA (United States)	MOS (Canada)	BEL (United States)	ATL (United States)	LAG (United States)	Pts.

=== GT1 Teams Championship ===
Teams only scored points for their highest finishing entry in each race.

Pos.	Team	No.	SEB (United States)	STP (United States)	LBH (United States)	UTA (United States)	LIM (United States)	MOH (United States)	ROA (United States)	MOS (Canada)	BEL (United States)	ATL (United States)	LAG (United States)	Pts.
1	(United States) Corvette Racing	3	1	2	1	1	1	1	1	1	2	1	2	250
1	(United States) Corvette Racing	4	2	1	2	2	2	2	3	2	1	2	1	250
2	(United States) Bell Motorsports	008	3	Ret			Ret		2	3	3			70
Pos.	Team	No.	SEB (United States)	STP (United States)	LBH (United States)	UTA (United States)	LIM (United States)	MOH (United States)	ROA (United States)	MOS (Canada)	BEL (United States)	ATL (United States)	LAG (United States)	Pts.

=== GT2 Drivers' Championship ===
Pos.	Driver	Team	SEB (United States)	STP (United States)	LBH (United States)	UTA (United States)	LIM (United States)	MOH (United States)	ROA (United States)	MOS (Canada)	BEL (United States)	ATL (United States)	LAG (United States)	Pts.
1	(Germany) Jörg Bergmeister	(United States) Flying Lizard Motorsports	1	9	2	1	1	3	2	3	1	2	9	188
1	(Germany) Wolf Henzler	(United States) Flying Lizard Motorsports	1	9	2	1	1	3	2	3	1	2	9	188
2	(Germany) Dominik Farnbacher	(United States) Tafel Racing	7	1	1	3	4	1	3	4	9	3	1	175
2	(Germany) Dirk Müller	(United States) Tafel Racing	7	1	1	3	4	1	3	4	9	3	1	175
3	(United States) Johannes van Overbeek	(United States) Flying Lizard Motorsports	8	2	3	2	7	2	4	9	2	8	4	139
3	(France) Patrick Pilet	(United States) Flying Lizard Motorsports	8	2	3	2	7	2	4	9	2	8	4	139
4	(Finland) Mika Salo	(United States) Risi Competizione	Ret	10	9	Ret	3	5	5	1	3	1	2	121
4	(Brazil) Jaime Melo	(United States) Risi Competizione	Ret	10	9	Ret	3	5	5	1	3	1	2	121
5	(United States) Seth Neiman	(United States) Flying Lizard Motorsports	2	7	7	5	Ret	Ret	7	7		6	5	84
6	(Germany) Dirk Werner	(United States) Farnbacher-Loles Motorsports	Ret	3		DSQ	2	4	1	2		Ret	DSQ	80
7	(United States) Darren Law	(United States) Flying Lizard Motorsports	2	7		5	Ret		7			6	5	76
8	(United States) Jim Tafel	(United States) Tafel Racing	4			Ret	9	8	9	6	6	7		58
9	(Germany) Marc Lieb	(United States) Flying Lizard Motorsports	1									2		56
10	(United States) Tommy Milner	(United States) Panoz Team PTG	Ret	6	Ret	4	5	7	Ret	5	10	12	3	55
10	(United States) Harrison Brix	(United States) Risi Competizione		5	6	7	6	6	6		5			55
10	(United States) Harrison Brix	(United States) Tafel Racing											10	55
11	(United Kingdom) Richard Westbrook	(United States) Farnbacher-Loles Motorsports					2	4	1					51
12	(Germany) Pierre Kaffer	(United States) Farnbacher-Loles Motorsports								2				45
12	(Germany) Pierre Kaffer	(Monaco) JMB Racing										5	6	45
13	(United States) Alex Figge	(United States) Tafel Racing				Ret	9	8	9	6	6	7	10	44
14	(United States) Tracy Krohn	(United States) Risi Competizione	3									4	11	43
14	(Sweden) Niclas Jönsson	(United States) Risi Competizione	3									4	11	43
14	(Belgium) Eric van de Poele	(United States) Risi Competizione	3									4		43
15	(Germany) Pierre Ehret	(United States) Tafel Racing	4									7	10	40
16	(Germany) Marc Basseng	(United States) Farnbacher-Loles Motorsports	Ret	3	5	DSQ								37
16	(Germany) Marc Basseng	(Germany) VICI Racing							8	Ret	Ret	10	Ret	37
17	(United States) Tom Sutherland	(United States) Panoz Team PTG	Ret	6	Ret	4	5	7		5	10			37
17	(United States) Lonnie Pechnik	(United States) Flying Lizard Motorsports			7			Ret		7	4	6		34
18	(Australia) Alex Davison	(United States) Flying Lizard Motorsports	2											33
18	(Australia) Alex Davison	(United States) Farnbacher-Loles Motorsports			5									33
19	(United Kingdom) Rob Bell	(United States) Tafel Racing	7											33
19	(United Kingdom) Rob Bell	(United States) Risi Competizione							6		5			33
20	(Austria) Patrick Friesacher	(United States) Risi Competizione		5	6	7	6	6						30
21	(United Kingdom) Ben Aucott	(Monaco) JMB Racing										5	6	29
21	(United States) Bryce Miller	(United States) Farnbacher-Loles Motorsports	Ret						1			Ret	DSQ	25
21	(United Kingdom) Jonny Cocker	(United Kingdom) Drayson-Barwell	Ret	Ret	11	Ret	Ret	10	11	8	Ret	9	7	25
22	(United Kingdom) Paul Drayson	(United Kingdom) Drayson-Barwell	Ret	Ret	11	Ret	Ret	10	11	8	Ret	9	7	25
22	(United States) Joel Feinberg	(United States) Primetime Race Group	5	Ret	Ret	Ret	NC	Ret	Ret	10	7	Ret	Ret	23
22	(United Kingdom) Chris Hall	(United States) Primetime Race Group	5	Ret	Ret	Ret	NC	Ret	Ret	10	7	Ret	Ret	23
22	(United States) Gunnar Jeannette	(United States) Corsa Motorsport	Ret	4	4	8								23
22	(United Kingdom) Johnny Mowlem	(United States) Corsa Motorsport	Ret	4	4	8								23
22	(Netherlands) Nicky Pastorelli	(Germany) VICI Racing				9		9	8	Ret	Ret	10	Ret	23
22	(Netherlands) Francesco Pastorelli	(Germany) VICI Racing				9		9	8	Ret	Ret	10	Ret	23
23	(Denmark) Allan Simonsen	(United States) Tafel Racing	4											20
23	(United States) Craig Stanton	(Germany) VICI Racing	6	DNS	8	10								20
23	(United States) Nathan Swartzburgh	(Germany) VICI Racing	6	DNS	8	10								20
24	(United States) Joey Hand	(United States) Panoz Team PTG	Ret						Ret			12	3	18
24	(France) Stéphane Daoudi	(Monaco) JMB Racing										5		18
25	(United States) Tim Pappas	(United States) Black Swan Racing					8	Ret	10		Ret	11	8	17
25	(United States) Anthony Lazzaro	(United States) Black Swan Racing					8	Ret	10		Ret	11	8	17
26	(Germany) Uwe Alzen	(Germany) VICI Racing	6											16
27	(Austria) Richard Lietz	(United States) Flying Lizard Motorsports	8											13
28	(United Kingdom) Darren Turner	(United Kingdom) Drayson-Barwell										9		12
29	(United States) Lou Gigliotti	(United States) LG Motorsports	Ret	8	10	6						Ret		10
29	(Austria) Martin Ragginger	(United States) Flying Lizard Motorsports									4			10
30	(United States) Eric Curran	(United States) LG Motorsports				6								6
32	(United States) Doug Peterson	(United States) LG Motorsports	Ret	8	10	Ret								4
33	(United States) David Murry	(United States) Robertson Racing	Ret	11	12		DNS	11	12	DNS	8	Ret	12	3
33	(United States) Andrea Robertson	(United States) Robertson Racing	Ret	11		Ret	DNS	11	12	DNS	8	Ret	12	3
33	(United States) David Robertson	(United States) Robertson Racing	Ret		12	Ret	DNS	11	12	DNS	8	Ret	12	3
34	(Brazil) Ruben Carrapatoso	(Germany) VICI Racing		DNS		9								2
-	(United States) Andy Pilgrim	(United States) Black Swan Racing										11		0
-	(Belgium) Marc Goossens	(United States) LG Motorsports	Ret									Ret		0
-	(Slovakia) Miro Konôpka	(Slovakia) Autoracing Club Bratislava	Ret											0
-	(Italy) Mauro Casadei	(Slovakia) Autoracing Club Bratislava	Ret											0
-	(Slovakia) Miroslav Hornak	(Slovakia) Autoracing Club Bratislava	Ret											0
-	(Italy) Gianmaria Bruni	(United States) Risi Competizione	Ret											0
-	(United Kingdom) Tim Sugden	(United Kingdom) Drayson-Barwell	Ret											0
-	(Germany) Ralf Kelleners	(United States) Corsa Motorsport	Ret											0
-	(Germany) Jörg Hardt	(United States) Farnbacher-Loles Motorsports										Ret		0
-	(United States) Tomy Drissi	(United States) LG Motorsports										Ret		0
Pos.	Driver	Team	SEB (United States)	STP (United States)	LBH (United States)	UTA (United States)	LIM (United States)	MOH (United States)	ROA (United States)	MOS (Canada)	BEL (United States)	ATL (United States)	LAG (United States)	Pts.

=== GT2 Teams Championship ===
Teams only scored points for their highest finishing entry in each race.

Pos.	Team	No.	SEB (United States)	STP (United States)	LBH (United States)	UTA (United States)	LIM (United States)	MOH (United States)	ROA (United States)	MOS (Canada)	BEL (United States)	ATL (United States)	LAG (United States)	Pts.
1	(United States) Flying Lizard Motorsports	45	1	9	2	1	1	3	2	3	1	2	9	213
1	(United States) Flying Lizard Motorsports	46	8	2	3	2	7	2	4	9	2	8	4	213
2	(United States) Tafel Racing	71	7	1	1	3	4	1	3	4	9	3	1	185
2	(United States) Tafel Racing	73	4			Ret	9	8	9	6	6	7	10	185
3	(United States) Risi Competizione	61	3	5	6	7	6	6	6		5	4	11	159
3	(United States) Risi Competizione	62	Ret	10	9	Ret	3	5	5	1	3	1	2	159
4	(United States) Flying Lizard Motorsports 44	44	2	7	7	5	Ret	Ret	7	7	4	6	5	94
5	(United States) Farnbacher-Loles Motorsports	87	Ret	3	5	DSQ	2	4	1	2		Ret	DSQ	88
6	(United States) Panoz Team PTG	21	Ret	6	Ret	4	5	7	Ret	5	10	12	3	55
7	(Germany) VICI Racing	5	6	DNS	8	10								42
7	(Germany) VICI Racing	18				9		9	8	Ret	Ret	10	Ret	42
8	(United Kingdom) Drayson-Barwell	007	Ret	Ret	11	Ret	Ret	10	11	8	Ret	9	7	25
9	(United States) Corsa Motorsport	48	Ret	4	4	8								23
10	(United States) Primetime Race Group	11	5	Ret	Ret	Ret	NC	Ret	Ret	10	7	Ret	Ret	23
11	(United States) Black Swan Racing	54					8	Ret	10		Ret	11	8	17
12	(United States) LG Motorsports	28	Ret	8	10	6						Ret		10
13	(United States) Robertson Racing	40	Ret	11	12	Ret	DNS	11	12	DNS	8	Ret	12	3
NC	(Monaco) JMB Racing	99										5	6	0 (29)
NC	(Slovakia) Autoracing Club Bratislava	77	Ret											0
Pos.	Team		SEB (United States)	STP (United States)	LBH (United States)	UTA (United States)	LIM (United States)	MOH (United States)	ROA (United States)	MOS (Canada)	BEL (United States)	ATL (United States)	LAG (United States)	Pts.

== Partial season entries ==
- Team Cytosport, following a partnership with Charouz Racing System and Team Jota to run in the Le Mans Series and 24 Hours of Le Mans, plans to return to the ALMS at Mid-Ohio
- Although Team ECO attempted to run their diesel-powered Radical SR10 LMP1 at Sebring, homologation problems have forced the team to delay their debut until Mid-Ohio.
- Autocon Motorsports will run a partial schedule, skipping most street circuit rounds, to concentrate on their bid for the 24 Hours of Le Mans. Their car will be upgraded to full CA07 specification by Le Mans.

== Green Challenge ==
On June 24, 2008, the ALMS has announced for a new challenge called the Green Challenge. The challenge, integrated with the series races, and which will debut at this year's Petit Le Mans, and continuing with the entire full season in 2009, emphasizes on targeting the series for "green racing." The ALMS was the first motorsport racing series in North America to be recognized by the United States Environmental Protection Agency (the EPA), the United States Department of Energy and the Society of Automotive Engineers (SAE International) to be recognized as a "Green Racing Series", and these three will take part organizing the challenge. All the teams will be eligible for the Green Challenge. The point system will be the same as the regular ALMS scoring system, but teams start out with the most possible points a team in the ALMS have during the season, and the points are deducted based on the performance of the vehicle. The lowest points at the end of the season would be the Green Challenge season champion.

== Bibliography ==
- Machaquereiro, John; et al. (2009). American Le Mans Series Season Yearbook 2008. TPP Publishing Inc. ISBN 978-0981539010.
