= 2008 Sports Car Challenge of Mid-Ohio =

The layout of Mid-Ohio Sports Car Course

The 2008 Acura Sports Car Challenge of Mid-Ohio was the sixth round of the 2008 American Le Mans Series season. It took place at Mid-Ohio Sports Car Course, Ohio on July 19, 2008.

== Race results ==
Class winners in bold. Cars failing to complete 70% of winner's distance marked as Not Classified (NC).

Pos	Class	No	Team	Drivers	Chassis	Tyre	Laps
Pos	Class	No	Team	Drivers	Engine	Tyre	Laps
1	**LMP1**	**2**	**(United States) Audi Sport North America**	**(Germany) Marco Werner (Germany) Lucas Luhr**	**Audi R10 TDI**	MI	**111**
1	**LMP1**	**2**	**(United States) Audi Sport North America**	**(Germany) Marco Werner (Germany) Lucas Luhr**	**Audi TDI 5.5 L Turbo V12 (Diesel)**	MI	**111**
2	LMP1	1	(United States) Audi Sport North America	(Italy) Rinaldo Capello (Italy) Emanuele Pirro	Audi R10 TDI	MI	111
2	LMP1	1	(United States) Audi Sport North America	(Italy) Rinaldo Capello (Italy) Emanuele Pirro	Audi TDI 5.5 L Turbo V12 (Diesel)	MI	111
3	**LMP2**	**7**	**(United States) Penske Racing**	**(Germany) Timo Bernhard (France) Romain Dumas**	**Porsche RS Spyder Evo**	MI	**111**
3	**LMP2**	**7**	**(United States) Penske Racing**	**(Germany) Timo Bernhard (France) Romain Dumas**	**Porsche MR6 3.4 L V8**	MI	**111**
4	LMP2	9	(United States) Patrón Highcroft Racing	(United States) Scott Sharp (Australia) David Brabham	Acura ARX-01B	MI	111
4	LMP2	9	(United States) Patrón Highcroft Racing	(United States) Scott Sharp (Australia) David Brabham	Acura AL7R 3.4 L V8	MI	111
5	LMP2	15	(Mexico) Lowe's Fernández Racing	(Mexico) Adrian Fernández (Mexico) Luis Díaz	Acura ARX-01B	MI	111
5	LMP2	15	(Mexico) Lowe's Fernández Racing	(Mexico) Adrian Fernández (Mexico) Luis Díaz	Acura AL7R 3.4 L V8	MI	111
6	LMP2	6	(United States) Penske Racing	(United States) Patrick Long (Germany) Sascha Maassen	Porsche RS Spyder Evo	MI	111
6	LMP2	6	(United States) Penske Racing	(United States) Patrick Long (Germany) Sascha Maassen	Porsche MR6 3.4 L V8	MI	111
7	LMP2	16	(United States) Dyson Racing	(United States) Chris Dyson (United Kingdom) Guy Smith	Porsche RS Spyder Evo	MI	111
7	LMP2	16	(United States) Dyson Racing	(United States) Chris Dyson (United Kingdom) Guy Smith	Porsche MR6 3.4 L V8	MI	111
8	LMP2	20	(United States) Dyson Racing	(United States) Butch Leitzinger (United Kingdom) Marino Franchitti	Porsche RS Spyder Evo	MI	111
8	LMP2	20	(United States) Dyson Racing	(United States) Butch Leitzinger (United Kingdom) Marino Franchitti	Porsche MR6 3.4 L V8	MI	111
9	**GT2**	**71**	**(United States) Tafel Racing**	**(Germany) Dominik Farnbacher (Germany) Dirk Müller**	**Ferrari F430GT**	MI	**104**
9	**GT2**	**71**	**(United States) Tafel Racing**	**(Germany) Dominik Farnbacher (Germany) Dirk Müller**	**Ferrari 4.0 L V8**	MI	**104**
10	GT2	46	(United States) Flying Lizard Motorsports	(United States) Johannes van Overbeek (France) Patrick Pilet	Porsche 997 GT3-RSR	MI	104
10	GT2	46	(United States) Flying Lizard Motorsports	(United States) Johannes van Overbeek (France) Patrick Pilet	Porsche 4.0 L Flat-6	MI	104
11	GT2	45	(United States) Flying Lizard Motorsports	(Germany) Jörg Bergmeister (Germany) Wolf Henzler	Porsche 997 GT3-RSR	MI	104
11	GT2	45	(United States) Flying Lizard Motorsports	(Germany) Jörg Bergmeister (Germany) Wolf Henzler	Porsche 4.0 L Flat-6	MI	104
12	GT2	87	(United States) Farnbacher-Loles Motorsports	(United Kingdom) Richard Westbrook (Germany) Dirk Werner	Porsche 997 GT3-RSR	MI	104
12	GT2	87	(United States) Farnbacher-Loles Motorsports	(United Kingdom) Richard Westbrook (Germany) Dirk Werner	Porsche 4.0 L Flat-6	MI	104
13	GT2	62	(United States) Risi Competizione	(Brazil) Jaime Melo (Finland) Mika Salo	Ferrari F430GT	MI	103
13	GT2	62	(United States) Risi Competizione	(Brazil) Jaime Melo (Finland) Mika Salo	Ferrari 4.0 L V8	MI	103
14	LMP2	26	(United States) Andretti Green Racing	(France) Franck Montagny (Brazil) Raphael Matos	Acura ARX-01B	MI	103
14	LMP2	26	(United States) Andretti Green Racing	(France) Franck Montagny (Brazil) Raphael Matos	Acura AL7R 3.4 L V8	MI	103
15	LMP1	30	(United States) Intersport Racing	(United Kingdom) Ryan Lewis (United States) John Faulkner	Lola B06/10	D	103
15	LMP1	30	(United States) Intersport Racing	(United Kingdom) Ryan Lewis (United States) John Faulkner	AER P32C 3.6 L Turbo V8	D	103
16	GT2	61	(United States) Risi Competizione	(Austria) Patrick Friesacher (United States) Harrison Brix	Ferrari F430GT	MI	102
16	GT2	61	(United States) Risi Competizione	(Austria) Patrick Friesacher (United States) Harrison Brix	Ferrari 4.0 L V8	MI	102
17	GT2	21	(United States) Panoz Team PTG	(United States) Tom Milner (United States) Tom Sutherland	Panoz Esperante GT-LM	D	102
17	GT2	21	(United States) Panoz Team PTG	(United States) Tom Milner (United States) Tom Sutherland	Ford (Élan) 5.0 L V8	D	102
18	GT2	73	(United States) Tafel Racing	(United States) Jim Tafel (United States) Alex Figge	Ferrari F430GT	MI	101
18	GT2	73	(United States) Tafel Racing	(United States) Jim Tafel (United States) Alex Figge	Ferrari 4.0 L V8	MI	101
19	GT2	18	(Germany) VICI Racing	(Netherlands) Nicky Pastorelli (Netherlands) Francesco Pastorelli	Porsche 997 GT3-RSR	KU	101
19	GT2	18	(Germany) VICI Racing	(Netherlands) Nicky Pastorelli (Netherlands) Francesco Pastorelli	Porsche 4.0 L Flat-6	KU	101
20	LMP2	8	(United States) B-K Motorsports	(United States) Gerardo Bonilla (United Kingdom) Ben Devlin	Lola B07/46	D	99
20	LMP2	8	(United States) B-K Motorsports	(United States) Gerardo Bonilla (United Kingdom) Ben Devlin	Mazda MZR-R 2.0 L Turbo I4 (E85 ethanol)	D	99
21	**GT1**	**3**	**(United States) Corvette Racing**	**(United States) Johnny O'Connell (Denmark) Jan Magnussen**	**Chevrolet Corvette C6.R**	MI	**98**
21	**GT1**	**3**	**(United States) Corvette Racing**	**(United States) Johnny O'Connell (Denmark) Jan Magnussen**	**Chevrolet LS7-R 7.0 L V8 (E85 ethanol)**	MI	**98**
22	GT1	4	(United States) Corvette Racing	(United Kingdom) Oliver Gavin (Monaco) Olivier Beretta	Chevrolet Corvette C6.R	MI	98
22	GT1	4	(United States) Corvette Racing	(United Kingdom) Oliver Gavin (Monaco) Olivier Beretta	Chevrolet LS7-R 7.0 L V8 (E85 ethanol)	MI	98
23	GT2	007	(United Kingdom) Drayson-Barwell	(United Kingdom) Paul Drayson (United Kingdom) Jonny Cocker	Aston Martin V8 Vantage GT2	D	94
23	GT2	007	(United Kingdom) Drayson-Barwell	(United Kingdom) Paul Drayson (United Kingdom) Jonny Cocker	Aston Martin 4.5 L V8 (E85 ethanol)	D	94
24	GT2	40	(United States) Robertson Racing	(United States) David Robertson (United States) Andrea Robertson (United States) David Murry	Ford GT-R Mk.VII	D	93
24	GT2	40	(United States) Robertson Racing	(United States) David Robertson (United States) Andrea Robertson (United States) David Murry	Ford 5.0 L V8	D	93
25	LMP1	12	(United States) Autocon Motorsports	(United States) Chris McMurry (United States) Bryan Willman	Creation CA07	D	92
25	LMP1	12	(United States) Autocon Motorsports	(United States) Chris McMurry (United States) Bryan Willman	Judd GV5 5.0 L V10	D	92
26 DNF	LMP2	66	(United States) de Ferran Motorsports	(Brazil) Gil de Ferran (France) Simon Pagenaud	Acura ARX-01B	MI	67
26 DNF	LMP2	66	(United States) de Ferran Motorsports	(Brazil) Gil de Ferran (France) Simon Pagenaud	Acura AL7R 3.4 L V8	MI	67
27 DNF	GT2	11	(United States) Primetime Race Group	(United States) Joel Feinberg (United Kingdom) Chris Hall	Dodge Viper Competition Coupe	HK	43
27 DNF	GT2	11	(United States) Primetime Race Group	(United States) Joel Feinberg (United Kingdom) Chris Hall	Dodge 8.3 L V10	HK	43
28 DNF	GT2	44	(United States) Flying Lizard Motorsports 44	(United States) Lonnie Pechnik (United States) Seth Neiman	Porsche 997 GT3-RSR	MI	37
28 DNF	GT2	44	(United States) Flying Lizard Motorsports 44	(United States) Lonnie Pechnik (United States) Seth Neiman	Porsche 4.0 L Flat-6	MI	37
29 DNF	GT2	54	(United States) Black Swan Racing	(United States) Tim Pappas (United States) Anthony Lazzaro	Ford GT-R Mk.VII	FAL	27
29 DNF	GT2	54	(United States) Black Swan Racing	(United States) Tim Pappas (United States) Anthony Lazzaro	Ford 5.0 L V8	FAL	27
30 DNF	LMP1	37	(United States) Intersport Racing	(United States) Jon Field (United States) Clint Field (United States) Richard Berry	Lola B06/10	D	23
30 DNF	LMP1	37	(United States) Intersport Racing	(United States) Jon Field (United States) Clint Field (United States) Richard Berry	AER P32C 4.0 L Turbo V8 (E85 ethanol)	D	23

== Statistics ==
- Pole Position - #66 de Ferran Motorsports - 1:07.969
- Fastest Lap - #2 Audi Sport North America - 1:10.034

American Le Mans Series
Previous race: 2008 Northeast Grand Prix	2008 season	Next race: 2008 Road America 500
