= Utah Grand Prix =

American Le Mans Series
- Venue: Miller Motorsports Park
- First ALMS race: 2006
- Last race: 2010
- Duration: 2 Hours 45 Minutes
- Most wins (driver): Simon Pagenaud (2)
- Most wins (team): Penske Racing (2)
- Most wins (manufacturer): Porsche (2)

The Utah Grand Prix is a weekend of sports car held from 2006 to 2010 at Miller Motorsports Park in Tooele, Utah. Until 2010, it was a round of the American Le Mans Series. The weekend also featured selected SCCA and IMSA races, including the Pirelli World Challenge.

Full course was used in 2006 and 2007.

== Winners ==
=== American Le Mans Series ===
Date	Winner(s)	Entrant	Car	Distance/Duration	Course	Report
2006	(Germany) Frank Biela (Italy) Emanuele Pirro	(United States) Audi Sport North America	Audi R10 TDI	2 hours, 45 minutes	4.48-mile Full Course	report
2007	(Germany) Sascha Maassen (Australia) Ryan Briscoe	(United States) Penske Racing	Porsche RS Spyder	2 hours, 45 minutes	4.48-mile Full Course	report
2008	(Germany) Timo Bernhard (France) Romain Dumas	(United States) Penske Racing	Porsche RS Spyder	2 hours, 45 minutes	3.05-mile Outer Course	report
2009	(Brazil) Gil de Ferran (France) Simon Pagenaud	(United States) de Ferran Motorsports	Acura ARX-02a	2 hours, 45 minutes	3.05-mile Outer Course	report
2010	(Australia) David Brabham (France) Simon Pagenaud	(United States) Patrón Highcroft Racing	HPD ARX-01C	2 hours, 45 minutes	3.05-mile Outer Course	report
