= VICI Racing =

VICI Racing is a Miami, Florida and Munich, Germany-based racing team with more than 20 years of experience competing at the topmost levels of international sportscar racing.

It competes in both GT and prototype categories, in Europe and the United States. VICI Racing is a wholly owned subsidiary of the VICI Group, which is composed of technology-led companies. VICI Racing roll call of wins includes GT victory in the Daytona 24 Hours. Founder and President is former professional racing driver Ron Meixner.

== 2008 ==
In 2008 VICI Racing partnered with Hughes Electronics and carried out a tire development programme in the American Le Mans Series for Kumho Tires. The team carried out a full year programme. Drivers included Uwe Alzen, Nicky Pastorelli and Marc Basseng. The #18 car finished 6th in its first race of the programme, the 12 Hours of Sebring. The team expanded to run 2 cars at the Utah Grand Prix, the 4th round of the season.

== 2009 ==
In 2009 VICI Racing ran the T-Mobile Porsche 911 GT3 RSR (2008) in the American Le Mans Series GT2 category. The team finished in 4th place in the first race of their 2009 programme, the Grand Prix of Long Beach, having qualified 6th. The drivers were Richard Westbrook and Johannes Stuck (son of Hans-Joachim Stuck). The team finished in sixth place at the Utah Grand Prix with Nicky Pastorelli and Johannes Stuck.The team finished fifth at the American Le Mans Northeastern Grand Prix The team skipped four races between the fifth round of the series at Lime Rock Park and the season finale at Mazda Raceway Laguna Seca and did not return to the series in 2010.
