= Luis Díaz (racing driver) =

Mexican racing driver (born 1977)

- Nationality: (Mexico) Mexican
- Born: 1 December 1977 (age 48) Mexico City

American Le Mans Series career
- Current team: Level 5 Motorsports
- Categorisation: FIA Gold
- Former teams: PR1/Mathiasen Motorsports; Alex Job Racing; Fernandez Racing; Chip Ganassi Racing; Walker Racing; Dorricott Racing

Previous series
- Rolex Sports Car Series; Champ Car World Series; Atlantic Championship; Indy Lights

Championship titles
- 1998 2009: Formula Mexico; ALMS P2 Championship

24 Hours of Le Mans career
- Years: 2012
- Teams: (United States) Level 5 Motorsports

Luis Miguel "Chaps" Díaz Castell (born 1 December 1977, in Mexico City) is a Mexican racing driver who competes in the American Le Mans Series for Level 5 Motorsports. He won the 2009 American Le Mans Series LMP2 class drivers championship alongside team owner Adrián Fernández, and was runner-up in the 2005 and 2006 Rolex Sports Car Series DP drivers championship. Díaz also has an extensive open-wheel racing background.

== Early racing career ==
Starting off in karting in 1989, Díaz was National Kart Champion in the A category and a two-time champion in the Super 100cc category. He earned Rookie of the Year honors in 1996 in Formula Reynard before moving up to Formula 3 International in 1997, where he was the highest-placed Mexican driver in the series that year.

Díaz earned the Formula Mexico title in 1998, followed by a season in the Panamerican Indy Lights, where he was also Rookie of the Year and the first Mexican driver to win a race in that series.

== Indy Lights ==
Díaz made his Indy Lights debut in 1999, finishing tenth in his first race at Laguna Seca. One year later, he joined the GO-Quaker-Herdez team before transitioning to Roquin Motorsports in 2001, where he finished seventh in the championship with one podium and four top-five finishes to his credit.

== Atlantic Championship ==
Díaz was hired by Dorricot Racing in 2002 and competed in his first Formula Atlantic season, finishing fourth in the championship with wins at Portland and Road America.

The following year, Díaz won the season-opening round at Monterrey en route to an eighth-place finish in the end-of-year championship. He was awarded the Gilles Villeneuve trophy for his achievements that year.

== Champ Car ==
Díaz made two Champ Car starts, both as a substitute driver at the Autodromo Hermanos Rodriguez circuit in Mexico City. He failed to finish both events.

== Grand-Am ==
Making his sports car racing debut in 2004, Diaz teamed with Jimmy Morales in a Lexus-Riley Daytona Prototype for Chip Ganassi Racing in the Rolex Sports Car Series.

In 2005, Diaz moved to the team’s No. 01 entry with Scott Pruett, earning three wins, eight podium finishes and four poles en route to a runner-up finish in the Daytona Prototype drivers championship. He repeated the feat again in 2006 and helped lead Ganassi to the teams championship.

== American Le Mans Series ==
Díaz made his American Le Mans Series debut in 2007, driving for Lowe’s Fernandez Racing in the LMP2 category with a Lola B06/43 Acura and later the Acura ARX-01a/b. He enjoyed a successful three-year stint with the team, culminating with the 2009 LMP2 Drivers Championship for he and Adrian Fernandez. That year, they scored nine wins out of ten races, with Díaz earning three class poles.

Following the demise of Fernandez Racing, Díaz made a handful of starts for both Alex Job Racing and PR1/Mathiasen Motorsports in 2010, reaching the podium four times and earning three class poles in the GTC and PC ranks.

The 2011 season saw Díaz join Level 5 Motorsports for its P2 program. He kicked off the season with a class win in the 2011 12 Hours of Sebring with Scott Tucker and Ryan Hunter-Reay before earning additional victories at Road America and Laguna Seca. Díaz remained at Level 5 Motorsports for 2012, earning the P2 victory at Laguna Seca in the team's HPD ARX-03b.

In addition to his success on the track, Díaz is a two-time winner of the "Most Popular Driver" award.

== 24 Hours of Le Mans ==
Díaz made his Le Mans debut in 2012, co-driving with Scott Tucker and Christophe Bouchut in Level 5 Motorsports’ LMP2-class HPD ARX-03b. The car failed to finish after running out of fuel on-track.

== Personal life ==
Díaz enjoys karting, golf, tennis, fitness, and Mini-Z RC Car Racing. His nickname is Chapulín (Grasshopper in English).

== Racing record ==
=== Complete A1 Grand Prix results ===
(key) (Races in bold indicate pole position) (Races in italics indicate fastest lap)

Year	Entrant	1	2	3	4	5	6	7	8	9	10	11	12	13	14	15	16	17	18	19	20	21	22	DC	Points	Ref
2005–06	A1 Team Mexico	GBR; SPR	GBR; FEA	GER; SPR	GER; FEA	POR; SPR	POR; FEA	AUS; SPR	AUS; FEA	MYS; SPR; 19	MYS; FEA; 15	UAE; SPR	UAE; FEA	RSA; SPR	RSA; FEA	IDN; SPR	IDN; FEA	MEX; SPR	MEX; FEA	USA; SPR	USA; FEA	CHN; SPR	CHN; FEA	10th	59	

=== Complete American open-wheel racing results ===
(key)

==== Indy Lights ====
Year	Team	1	2	3	4	5	6	7	8	9	10	11	12	Rank	Points	Ref
1999	Team Mexico Quaker Herdez	MIA	LBH	NAZ	MIL	POR	CLE	TOR	MIS	DET	CHI	LS; 10	FON	**23rd**	**3**	
2000	Team Mexico Quaker Herdez	LBH; 12	MIL; 10	DET; 14	POR; 8	MIS; 12	CHI; 6	MDO; 16	VAN; 12	LS; 7	STL	HOU; 7	FON; 15	**13th**	**31**	
2001	Roquin Motorsports	MTY; 11	LBH; 9	TXS; 4	MIL; 4	POR; 9	KAN; 7	TOR; 5	MDO; 11	STL; 6	ATL; 7	LS; 3	FON; 6	**7th**	**88**	

==== Atlantic Championship ====
Year	Team	1	2	3	4	5	6	7	8	9	10	11	12	Rank	Points
2002	Dorricott Racing	**MTY**; 5	LBH; 10	MIL; 9	LS; 15	**POR**; 1	CHI; 6	TOR; Ret	CLE; 3	TRR; 6	ROA; 1	MTL; 6	DEN; 6	**4th**	**124**
2003	Dorricott Racing	**MTY**; 10	LBH; 6	MIL; Ret	LS; 6	POR; 9	CLE; Ret	TOR; 9	TRR; 6	MDO; 7	MTL; 11	DEN; 8	MIA; 9	**8th**	**88**

==== CART ====
Year	Team	Chassis	Engine	1	2	3	4	5	6	7	8	9	10	11	12	13	14	15	16	17	18	19	Rank	Points	Ref
2002	Fernández Racing	Lola B02/00	Honda HR-2 V8t	MTY	LBH	MOT	MIL	LS	POR	CHI	TOR	CLE	VAN	MDO	ROA	MTL	DEN	ROC	MIA	SRF	FON	MXC; 19	**23rd**	**0**	
2003	Walker Racing	Reynard 02i	Ford XFE V8t	STP	MTY	LBH	BRH	LAU	MIL	LS	POR	CLE	TOR	VAN	ROA	MDO	MTL	DEN	MIA	MXC; 19	SRF	FON	**27th**	**0**	

=== Complete American Le Mans Series results ===
Year	Entrant	Class	Chassis	Engine	Tyres	1	2	3	4	5	6	7	8	9	10	11	12	Rank	Points	Ref
2007	Lowe's Fernández Racing	LMP2	Lola B06/43	Acura 3.4L V8	M	SEB ovr:3 cls:2	STP ovr:6 cls:4	LNB ovr:8 cls:7	TEX ovr:8 cls:7	UTA ovr:7 cls:5	LIM ovr:Ret cls:Ret	MID ovr:4 cls:3	AME ovr:8 cls:6	MOS ovr:8 cls:6	DET ovr:6 :cls:4	PET ovr:Ret cls:Ret	MON ovr:5 cls:3	11th	102	
2008	Lowe's Fernandez Racing	LMP2	Acura ARX-01b	Acura 3.4L V8	M	SEB ovr:DSQ cls:DSQ	STP ovr:10 cls:7	LNB ovr:8 cls:6	UTA ovr:5 cls:5	LIM ovr:5 cls:4	MID ovr:5 cls:3	AME ovr:Ret cls:Ret	MOS ovr:4 cls:2	DET ovr:23 cls:9	PET ovr:Ret cls:Ret	MON ovr:9 cls:7		12th	88	
2009	Lowe's Fernández Racing	LMP2	Acura ARX-01b	Acura 3.4L V8	M	SEB ovr:4 cls:1	STP ovr:2 cls:1	LNB ovr:3 cls:1	UTA ovr:3 cls:1	LIM ovr:7 cls:2	MID ovr:3 cls:1	AME ovr:3 cls:1	MOS ovr:3 cls:1	PET ovr:21 cls:2	MON ovr:2 cls:1			**1st**	**217**	
2010	Alex Job Racing	GTC	Porsche 997 GT3 Cup	Porsche 3.6L Flat-6	Y	SEB ovr:20 cls:3	LNB ovr:28 cls:7	MON ovr:20 cls:4	UTA ovr:Ret cls:Ret	LIM								16th	42	
2010	PR1/Mathiasen Motorsports	LMPC	Oreca FLM09	Chevrolet 6.2L V8	M						MID ovr:5 cls:3	AME ovr:6 cls:2	MOS ovr:10 cls:5	PET ovr:32 cls:3				9th	63	
2011	Level 5 Motorsports	LMP2	Lola B11/40	HPD HR28TT 2.8 L Turbo V6	M	SEB ovr:20 cls:1	LNB ovr:DNS cls:DNS	LIM	MOS	MID	AME ovr:5 cls:1	BAL						**2nd**	**78**	
2011	Level 5 Motorsports	LMP2	HPD ARX-01g	HPD HR28TT 2.8 L Turbo V6	M								MON ovr:4 cls:1	PET ovr:38 cls:5				**2nd**	**78**	
2012	Level 5 Motorsports	P2	HPD ARX-03b	Honda HR28TT 2.8 L Turbo V6	D	SEB ovr:Ret cls:Ret	LNB ovr:19 cls:3	MON ovr:2 cls:1	LIM ovr:WD cls:WD	MOS ovr:WD cls:WD	MID	AME ovr:12 cls:4	BAL ovr:2 cls:2	VIR ovr:Ret cls:Ret	PET			4th*	51*	

* Season still in progress.

=== 24 Hours of Le Mans results ===
Year	Team	Co-Drivers	Car	Class	Laps	Pos.	Class Pos.
2012	(United States) Level 5 Motorsports	(United States) Scott Tucker (France) Christophe Bouchut	HPD ARX-03b	LMP2	240	DNF	DNF

Sporting positions
Preceded by Timo Bernhard; Romain Dumas	ALMS; LMP2 Champion; 2009 with: Adrián Fernández	Succeeded by David Brabham; Simon Pagenaud
Preceded by None	Formula Mexico Champion; 1998	Succeeded by None
