= 2007 Lone Star Grand Prix =

Track map of Reliant Park

The 2007 Lone Star Grand Prix was the fourth round of the 2007 American Le Mans Series season. It took place on April 21, 2007.

== Official results ==
Class winners in bold. Cars failing to complete 70% of winner's distance marked as Not Classified (NC).

Pos	Class	No	Team	Drivers	Chassis	Tyre	Laps
Pos	Class	No	Team	Drivers	Engine	Tyre	Laps
1	**LMP2**	**7**	**(United States) Penske Racing**	**(France) Romain Dumas (Germany) Timo Bernhard**	**Porsche RS Spyder Evo**	MI	**146**
1	**LMP2**	**7**	**(United States) Penske Racing**	**(France) Romain Dumas (Germany) Timo Bernhard**	**Porsche MR6 3.4L V8**	MI	**146**
2	LMP2	26	(United States) Andretti Green Racing	(United States) Bryan Herta (United Kingdom) Marino Franchitti	Acura (Courage) ARX-01a	MI	146
2	LMP2	26	(United States) Andretti Green Racing	(United States) Bryan Herta (United Kingdom) Marino Franchitti	Acura AL7R 3.4L V8	MI	146
3	**LMP1**	**1**	**(United States) Audi Sport North America**	**(Italy) Rinaldo Capello (United Kingdom) Allan McNish**	**Audi R10 TDI**	MI	**146**
3	**LMP1**	**1**	**(United States) Audi Sport North America**	**(Italy) Rinaldo Capello (United Kingdom) Allan McNish**	**Audi 5.5L TDI V12 (Diesel)**	MI	**146**
4	LMP2	6	(United States) Penske Racing	(Germany) Sascha Maassen (Australia) Ryan Briscoe	Porsche RS Spyder Evo	MI	146
4	LMP2	6	(United States) Penske Racing	(Germany) Sascha Maassen (Australia) Ryan Briscoe	Porsche MR6 3.4L V8	MI	146
5	LMP2	9	(United States) Highcroft Racing	(Australia) David Brabham (Sweden) Stefan Johansson	Acura (Courage) ARX-01a	MI	145
5	LMP2	9	(United States) Highcroft Racing	(Australia) David Brabham (Sweden) Stefan Johansson	Acura AL7R 3.4L V8	MI	145
6	LMP2	20	(United States) Dyson Racing	(United States) Chris Dyson (United Kingdom) Guy Smith	Porsche RS Spyder Evo	MI	144
6	LMP2	20	(United States) Dyson Racing	(United States) Chris Dyson (United Kingdom) Guy Smith	Porsche MR6 3.4L V8	MI	144
7	LMP2	16	(United States) Dyson Racing	(United States) Butch Leitzinger (United Kingdom) Andy Wallace	Porsche RS Spyder Evo	MI	144
7	LMP2	16	(United States) Dyson Racing	(United States) Butch Leitzinger (United Kingdom) Andy Wallace	Porsche MR6 3.4L V8	MI	144
8	LMP2	15	(Mexico) Lowe's Fernández Racing	(Mexico) Adrian Fernández (Mexico) Luis Diaz	Lola B06/43	MI	144
8	LMP2	15	(Mexico) Lowe's Fernández Racing	(Mexico) Adrian Fernández (Mexico) Luis Diaz	Acura AL7R 3.4L V8	MI	144
9	LMP2	8	(United States) B-K Motorsports (Japan) Mazdaspeed	(United States) Jamie Bach (United Kingdom) Ben Devlin	Lola B07/46	KU	140
9	LMP2	8	(United States) B-K Motorsports (Japan) Mazdaspeed	(United States) Jamie Bach (United Kingdom) Ben Devlin	Mazda MZR-R 2.0L Turbo I4	KU	140
10	**GT1**	**3**	**(United States) Corvette Racing**	**(United States) Johnny O'Connell (Denmark) Jan Magnussen**	**Chevrolet Corvette C6.R**	MI	**138**
10	**GT1**	**3**	**(United States) Corvette Racing**	**(United States) Johnny O'Connell (Denmark) Jan Magnussen**	**Chevrolet LS7-R 7.0L V8**	MI	**138**
11	GT1	4	(United States) Corvette Racing	(United Kingdom) Oliver Gavin (Monaco) Olivier Beretta	Chevrolet Corvette C6.R	MI	138
11	GT1	4	(United States) Corvette Racing	(United Kingdom) Oliver Gavin (Monaco) Olivier Beretta	Chevrolet LS7-R 7.0L V8	MI	138
12	LMP1	2	(United States) Audi Sport North America	(Italy) Emanuele Pirro (Germany) Marco Werner	Audi R10 TDI	MI	138
12	LMP1	2	(United States) Audi Sport North America	(Italy) Emanuele Pirro (Germany) Marco Werner	Audi 5.5L TDI V12 (Diesel)	MI	138
13	**GT2**	**62**	**(United States) Risi Competizione**	**(Finland) Mika Salo (Brazil) Jaime Melo**	**Ferrari F430GT**	MI	**134**
13	**GT2**	**62**	**(United States) Risi Competizione**	**(Finland) Mika Salo (Brazil) Jaime Melo**	**Ferrari 4.0L V8**	MI	**134**
14	GT2	45	(United States) Flying Lizard Motorsports	(United States) Johannes van Overbeek (Germany) Jörg Bergmeister	Porsche 997 GT3-RSR	MI	134
14	GT2	45	(United States) Flying Lizard Motorsports	(United States) Johannes van Overbeek (Germany) Jörg Bergmeister	Porsche 3.8L Flat-6	MI	134
15	GT2	71	(United States) Tafel Racing	(Germany) Wolf Henzler (United Kingdom) Robin Liddell	Porsche 997 GT3-RSR	MI	133
15	GT2	71	(United States) Tafel Racing	(Germany) Wolf Henzler (United Kingdom) Robin Liddell	Porsche 3.8L Flat-6	MI	133
16	GT2	31	(United States) Petersen Motorsports (United States) White Lightning Racing	(Germany) Dirk Müller (Czech Republic) Jaroslav Janiš	Ferrari F430GT	MI	133
16	GT2	31	(United States) Petersen Motorsports (United States) White Lightning Racing	(Germany) Dirk Müller (Czech Republic) Jaroslav Janiš	Ferrari 4.0L V8	MI	133
17	GT2	44	(United States) Flying Lizard Motorsports	(United States) Darren Law (United States) Seth Neiman	Porsche 997 GT3-RSR	MI	130
17	GT2	44	(United States) Flying Lizard Motorsports	(United States) Darren Law (United States) Seth Neiman	Porsche 3.8L Flat-6	MI	130
18	GT2	54	(United States) Team Trans Sport Racing	(United States) Tim Pappas (United States) Terry Borcheller	Porsche 997 GT3-RSR	Y	128
18	GT2	54	(United States) Team Trans Sport Racing	(United States) Tim Pappas (United States) Terry Borcheller	Porsche 3.8L Flat-6	Y	128
19	GT2	22	(United States) Panoz Team PTG	(United States) Bryan Sellers (United States) Ross Smith (Canada) Scott Maxwell	Panoz Esperante GT-LM	Y	127
19	GT2	22	(United States) Panoz Team PTG	(United States) Bryan Sellers (United States) Ross Smith (Canada) Scott Maxwell	Ford (Élan) 5.0L V8	Y	127
20 DNF	GT2	18	(United States) Rahal Letterman Racing	(United States) Tom Milner Jr. (Germany) Ralf Kelleners	Porsche 997 GT3-RSR	MI	122
20 DNF	GT2	18	(United States) Rahal Letterman Racing	(United States) Tom Milner Jr. (Germany) Ralf Kelleners	Porsche 3.8L Flat-6	MI	122
21 DNF	LMP1	37	(United States) Intersport Racing	(United States) Jon Field (United States) Clint Field (United States) Richard Berry	Creation CA06/H	KU	102
21 DNF	LMP1	37	(United States) Intersport Racing	(United States) Jon Field (United States) Clint Field (United States) Richard Berry	Judd GV5 S2 5.0L V10	KU	102
22 DNF	GT2	73	(United States) Tafel Racing	(United States) Jim Tafel (Germany) Dominik Farnbacher	Porsche 997 GT3-RSR	MI	98
22 DNF	GT2	73	(United States) Tafel Racing	(United States) Jim Tafel (Germany) Dominik Farnbacher	Porsche 3.8L Flat-6	MI	98
23 NC	GT2	61	(United States) Risi Competizione (United States) Krohn Racing	(Sweden) Niclas Jönsson (United States) Tracy Krohn	Ferrari F430GT	MI	78
23 NC	GT2	61	(United States) Risi Competizione (United States) Krohn Racing	(Sweden) Niclas Jönsson (United States) Tracy Krohn	Ferrari 4.0L V8	MI	78
24 DNF	GT2	21	(United States) Panoz Team PTG	(United States) Bill Auberlen (United States) Joey Hand	Panoz Esperante GT-LM	Y	60
24 DNF	GT2	21	(United States) Panoz Team PTG	(United States) Bill Auberlen (United States) Joey Hand	Ford (Élan) 5.0L V8	Y	60

== Statistics ==
- Pole Position - #9 Highcroft Racing - 1:01.824
- Fastest Lap - #7 Penske Racing - 1:02.893

American Le Mans Series
Previous race: 2007 ALMS Grand Prix of Long Beach	2007 season	Next race: 2007 Utah Grand Prix
