= 2008 Utah Grand Prix =

American Le Mans Series car race in Utah

Track map of Miller Motorsports Park outer circuit

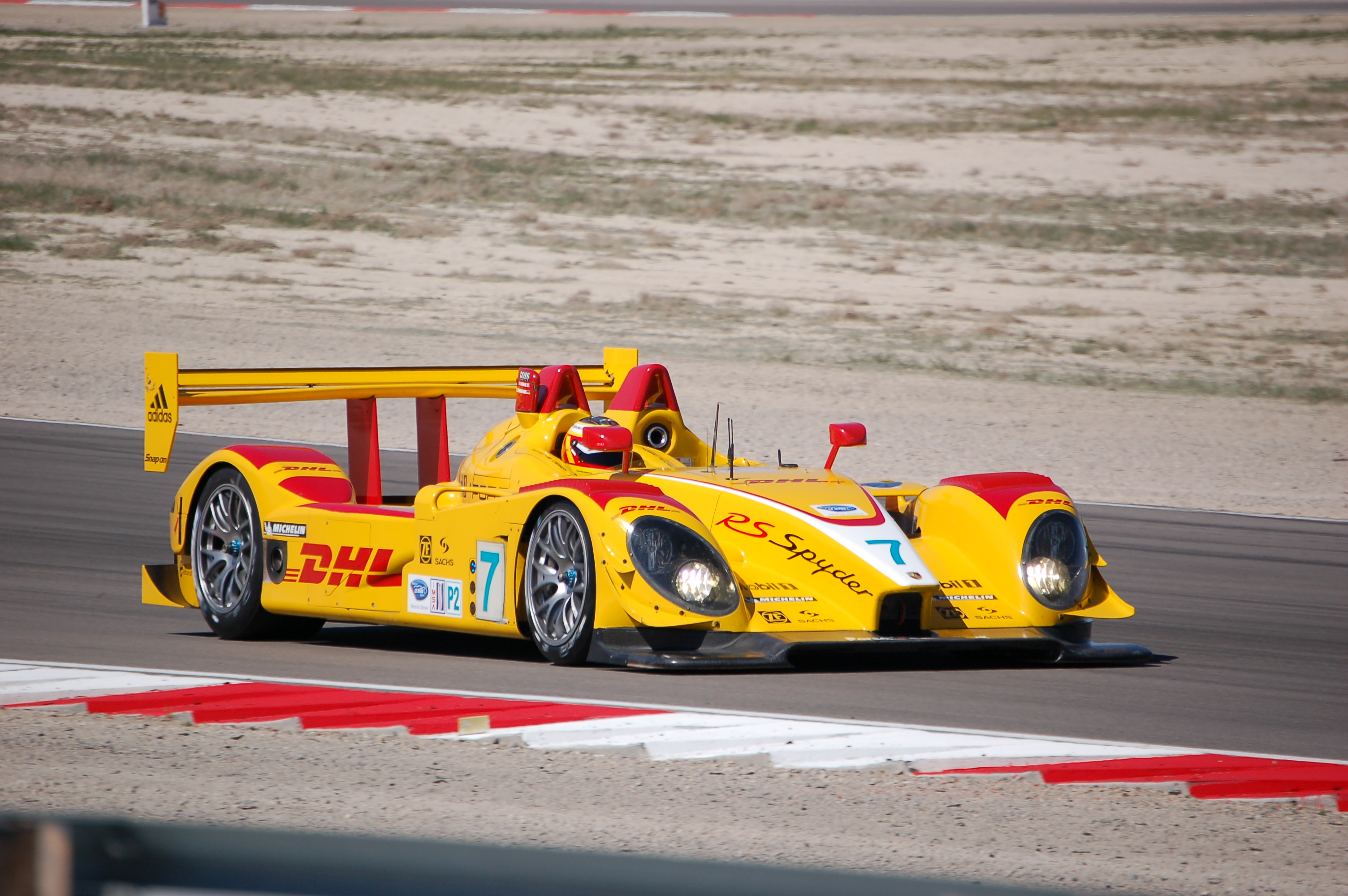
The race-winning Penske Racing Porsche RS Spyder

The 2008 Larry H. Miller Dealerships Utah Grand Prix was the fourth round of the 2008 American Le Mans Series season. It took place at Miller Motorsports Park, Utah on May 18, 2008.

== Race results ==
Class winners in bold. Cars failing to complete 70% of winner's distance marked as Not Classified (NC).

Pos	Class	No	Team	Drivers	Chassis	Tire	Laps
Pos	Class	No	Team	Drivers	Engine	Tire	Laps
1	**LMP2**	**7**	**(United States) Penske Racing**	**(Germany) Timo Bernhard (France) Romain Dumas**	**Porsche RS Spyder Evo**	MI	**96**
1	**LMP2**	**7**	**(United States) Penske Racing**	**(Germany) Timo Bernhard (France) Romain Dumas**	**Porsche MR6 3.4 L V8**	MI	**96**
2	LMP2	6	(United States) Penske Racing	(United States) Patrick Long (Germany) Sascha Maassen	Porsche RS Spyder Evo	MI	96
2	LMP2	6	(United States) Penske Racing	(United States) Patrick Long (Germany) Sascha Maassen	Porsche MR6 3.4 L V8	MI	96
3	LMP2	66	(United States) de Ferran Motorsport	(Brazil) Gil de Ferran (France) Simon Pagenaud	Acura ARX-01B	MI	96
3	LMP2	66	(United States) de Ferran Motorsport	(Brazil) Gil de Ferran (France) Simon Pagenaud	Acura AL7R 3.4 L V8	MI	96
4	LMP2	20	(United States) Dyson Racing	(United States) Butch Leitzinger (United Kingdom) Marino Franchitti	Porsche RS Spyder Evo	MI	96
4	LMP2	20	(United States) Dyson Racing	(United States) Butch Leitzinger (United Kingdom) Marino Franchitti	Porsche MR6 3.4 L V8	MI	96
5	LMP2	15	(Mexico) Lowe's Fernández Racing	(Mexico) Adrian Fernández (Mexico) Luis Díaz	Acura ARX-01B	MI	96
5	LMP2	15	(Mexico) Lowe's Fernández Racing	(Mexico) Adrian Fernández (Mexico) Luis Díaz	Acura AL7R 3.4 L V8	MI	96
6	LMP2	16	(United States) Dyson Racing	(United States) Chris Dyson (United Kingdom) Guy Smith	Porsche RS Spyder Evo	MI	95
6	LMP2	16	(United States) Dyson Racing	(United States) Chris Dyson (United Kingdom) Guy Smith	Porsche MR6 3.4 L V8	MI	95
7	**LMP1**	**2**	**(United States) Audi Sport North America**	**(Germany) Marco Werner (Germany) Lucas Luhr**	**Audi R10 TDI**	MI	**95**
7	**LMP1**	**2**	**(United States) Audi Sport North America**	**(Germany) Marco Werner (Germany) Lucas Luhr**	**Audi 5.5 L TDI V12 (turbodiesel)**	MI	**95**
8	LMP2	26	(United States) Andretti Green Racing	(United States) Bryan Herta (Brazil) Christian Fittipaldi	Acura ARX-01B	MI	94
8	LMP2	26	(United States) Andretti Green Racing	(United States) Bryan Herta (Brazil) Christian Fittipaldi	Acura AL7R 3.4 L V8	MI	94
9	LMP2	8	(United States) B-K Motorsports	(United States) Gerardo Bonilla (United Kingdom) Ben Devlin	Lola B07/46	Y	93
9	LMP2	8	(United States) B-K Motorsports	(United States) Gerardo Bonilla (United Kingdom) Ben Devlin	Mazda MZR-R 2.0 L Turbo I4 (E85 ethanol)	Y	93
10	**GT1**	**3**	**(United States) Corvette Racing**	**(United States) Johnny O'Connell (Denmark) Jan Magnussen**	**Chevrolet Corvette C6.R**	MI	**88**
10	**GT1**	**3**	**(United States) Corvette Racing**	**(United States) Johnny O'Connell (Denmark) Jan Magnussen**	**Chevrolet LS7-R 7.0 L V8 (E85 ethanol)**	MI	**88**
11	GT1	4	(United States) Corvette Racing	(United Kingdom) Oliver Gavin (Monaco) Olivier Beretta	Chevrolet Corvette C6.R	MI	88
11	GT1	4	(United States) Corvette Racing	(United Kingdom) Oliver Gavin (Monaco) Olivier Beretta	Chevrolet LS7-R 7.0 L V8 (E85 ethanol)	MI	88
12	LMP1	37	(United States) Intersport Racing	(United States) Jon Field (United States) Clint Field (United States) Richard Berry	Lola B06/10	D	88
12	LMP1	37	(United States) Intersport Racing	(United States) Jon Field (United States) Clint Field (United States) Richard Berry	AER P32C 4.0 L Turbo V8 (E85 ethanol)	D	88
13	**GT2**	**45**	**(United States) Flying Lizard Motorsports**	**(Germany) Jörg Bergmeister (Germany) Wolf Henzler**	**Porsche 997 GT3-RSR**	MI	**87**
13	**GT2**	**45**	**(United States) Flying Lizard Motorsports**	**(Germany) Jörg Bergmeister (Germany) Wolf Henzler**	**Porsche 3.8 L Flat-6**	MI	**87**
14	GT2	46	(United States) Flying Lizard Motorsports	(United States) Johannes van Overbeek (France) Patrick Pilet	Porsche 997 GT3-RSR	MI	86
14	GT2	46	(United States) Flying Lizard Motorsports	(United States) Johannes van Overbeek (France) Patrick Pilet	Porsche 3.8 L Flat-6	MI	86
15	GT2	71	(United States) Tafel Racing	(Germany) Dominik Farnbacher (Germany) Dirk Müller	Ferrari F430GT	MI	85
15	GT2	71	(United States) Tafel Racing	(Germany) Dominik Farnbacher (Germany) Dirk Müller	Ferrari 4.0 L V8	MI	85
16	GT2	21	(United States) Panoz Team PTG	(United States) Tommy Milner (United States) Tom Sutherland	Panoz Esperante GT-LM	D	84
16	GT2	21	(United States) Panoz Team PTG	(United States) Tommy Milner (United States) Tom Sutherland	Ford (Élan) 5.0 L V8	D	84
17	GT2	44	(United States) Flying Lizard Motorsports 44	(United States) Darren Law (United States) Seth Neiman	Porsche 997 GT3-RSR	MI	84
17	GT2	44	(United States) Flying Lizard Motorsports 44	(United States) Darren Law (United States) Seth Neiman	Porsche 3.8 L Flat-6	MI	84
18	GT2	28	(United States) LG Motorsports	(United States) Lou Gigliotti (United States) Doug Peterson (United States) Eric Curran	Chevrolet Corvette C6	D	83
18	GT2	28	(United States) LG Motorsports	(United States) Lou Gigliotti (United States) Doug Peterson (United States) Eric Curran	Chevrolet LS3 6.0 L V8	D	83
19	GT2	61	(United States) Risi Competizione	(Austria) Patrick Friesacher (United States) Harrison Brix	Ferrari F430GT	MI	83
19	GT2	61	(United States) Risi Competizione	(Austria) Patrick Friesacher (United States) Harrison Brix	Ferrari 4.0 L V8	MI	83
20 DNF^{†}	LMP1	1	(United States) Audi Sport North America	(Germany) Frank Biela (Italy) Emanuele Pirro	Audi R10 TDI	MI	79
20 DNF^{†}	LMP1	1	(United States) Audi Sport North America	(Germany) Frank Biela (Italy) Emanuele Pirro	Audi 5.5 L TDI V12 (turbodiesel)	MI	79
21 DNF	GT2	48	(United States) Corsa Motorsport	(United States) Gunnar Jeannette (United Kingdom) Johnny Mowlem	Ferrari F430GT	D	79
21 DNF	GT2	48	(United States) Corsa Motorsport	(United States) Gunnar Jeannette (United Kingdom) Johnny Mowlem	Ferrari 4.0 L V8	D	79
22 DNF	GT2	18	(Germany) VICI Racing	(Netherlands) Nicky Pastorelli (Netherlands) Francisco Pastorelli (Brazil) Ruben Carrapatoso	Porsche 997 GT3-RSR	KU	79
22 DNF	GT2	18	(Germany) VICI Racing	(Netherlands) Nicky Pastorelli (Netherlands) Francisco Pastorelli (Brazil) Ruben Carrapatoso	Porsche 3.8 L Flat-6	KU	79
23 DNF	GT2	5	(Germany) VICI Racing	(United States) Craig Stanton (United States) Nathan Swatzbaugh	Porsche 997 GT3-RSR	KU	77
23 DNF	GT2	5	(Germany) VICI Racing	(United States) Craig Stanton (United States) Nathan Swatzbaugh	Porsche 3.8 L Flat-6	KU	77
24	LMP2	9	(United States) Patrón Highcroft Racing	(United States) Scott Sharp (Australia) David Brabham	Acura ARX-01B	MI	70
24	LMP2	9	(United States) Patrón Highcroft Racing	(United States) Scott Sharp (Australia) David Brabham	Acura AL7R 3.4 L V8	MI	70
25 DNF	GT2	40	(United States) Robertson Racing	(United States) David Robertson (United States) Andrea Robertson (United States) David Murry	Ford GT-R Mk.VII	D	62
25 DNF	GT2	40	(United States) Robertson Racing	(United States) David Robertson (United States) Andrea Robertson (United States) David Murry	Ford 5.0 L V8	D	62
26 DNF	GT2	62	(United States) Risi Competizione	(Brazil) Jaime Melo (Finland) Mika Salo	Ferrari F430GT	MI	60
26 DNF	GT2	62	(United States) Risi Competizione	(Brazil) Jaime Melo (Finland) Mika Salo	Ferrari 4.0 L V8	MI	60
27 DNF	GT2	11	(United States) Primetime Race Group	(United States) Joel Feinberg (United States) Chris Hall	Dodge Viper Competition Coupe	HK	35
27 DNF	GT2	11	(United States) Primetime Race Group	(United States) Joel Feinberg (United States) Chris Hall	Dodge 8.3 L V10	HK	35
28 DNF	GT2	007	(United Kingdom) Drayson-Barwell	(United Kingdom) Paul Drayson (United Kingdom) Jonny Cocker	Aston Martin V8 Vantage GT2	D	27
28 DNF	GT2	007	(United Kingdom) Drayson-Barwell	(United Kingdom) Paul Drayson (United Kingdom) Jonny Cocker	Aston Martin 4.5 L V8 (E85 ethanol)	D	27
29 DNF	GT2	73	(United States) Tafel Racing	(United States) Jim Tafel (United States) Alex Figge	Ferrari F430GT	MI	25
29 DNF	GT2	73	(United States) Tafel Racing	(United States) Jim Tafel (United States) Alex Figge	Ferrari 4.0 L V8	MI	25
DSQ^{‡}	GT2	87	(United States) Farnbacher-Loles Motorsports	(Germany) Marc Basseng (Germany) Dirk Werner	Porsche 997 GT3-RSR	MI	85
DSQ^{‡}	GT2	87	(United States) Farnbacher-Loles Motorsports	(Germany) Marc Basseng (Germany) Dirk Werner	Porsche 3.8 L Flat-6	MI	85

† - #1 Audi Sport North America was docked three championship points for an avoidable on-track incident.

‡ - #87 Farnbacher-Loles Motorsports was disqualified after failing post-race technical inspection. The car's fuel cell was too large.

== Statistics ==
- Pole Position - #7 Penske Racing - 1:31.050
- Fastest Lap - #66 de Ferran Motorsport - 1:32.816

American Le Mans Series
Previous race: 2008 American Le Mans Series at Long Beach	2008 season	Next race: 2008 Northeast Grand Prix
