= Lone Star Grand Prix =

Track map of Reliant Park

The Lone Star Grand Prix was an American Le Mans Series sports car race that took place at JAGFlo Speedway at Reliant Park in Houston, Texas, United States. The Lone Star Grand Prix was part of the Grand Prix of Houston race weekend. The event took place in 2006 and 2007. The 2008 event was cancelled following the merger of the Champ Car World Series and Indy Racing League.

== Winners ==
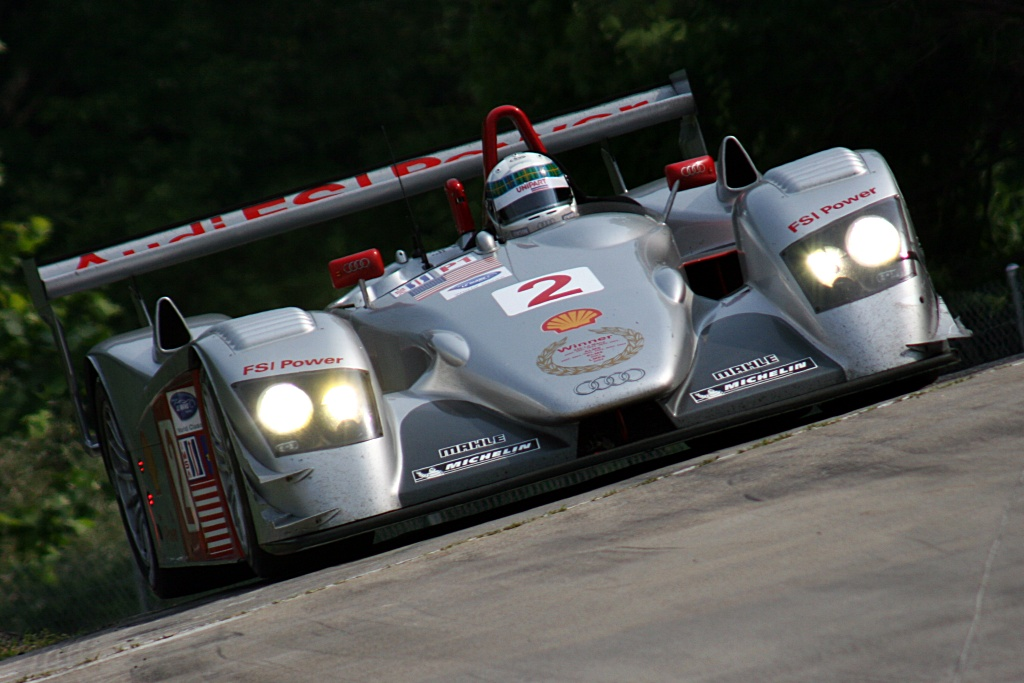
Rinaldo Capello and Allan McNish took overall honors in 2006.

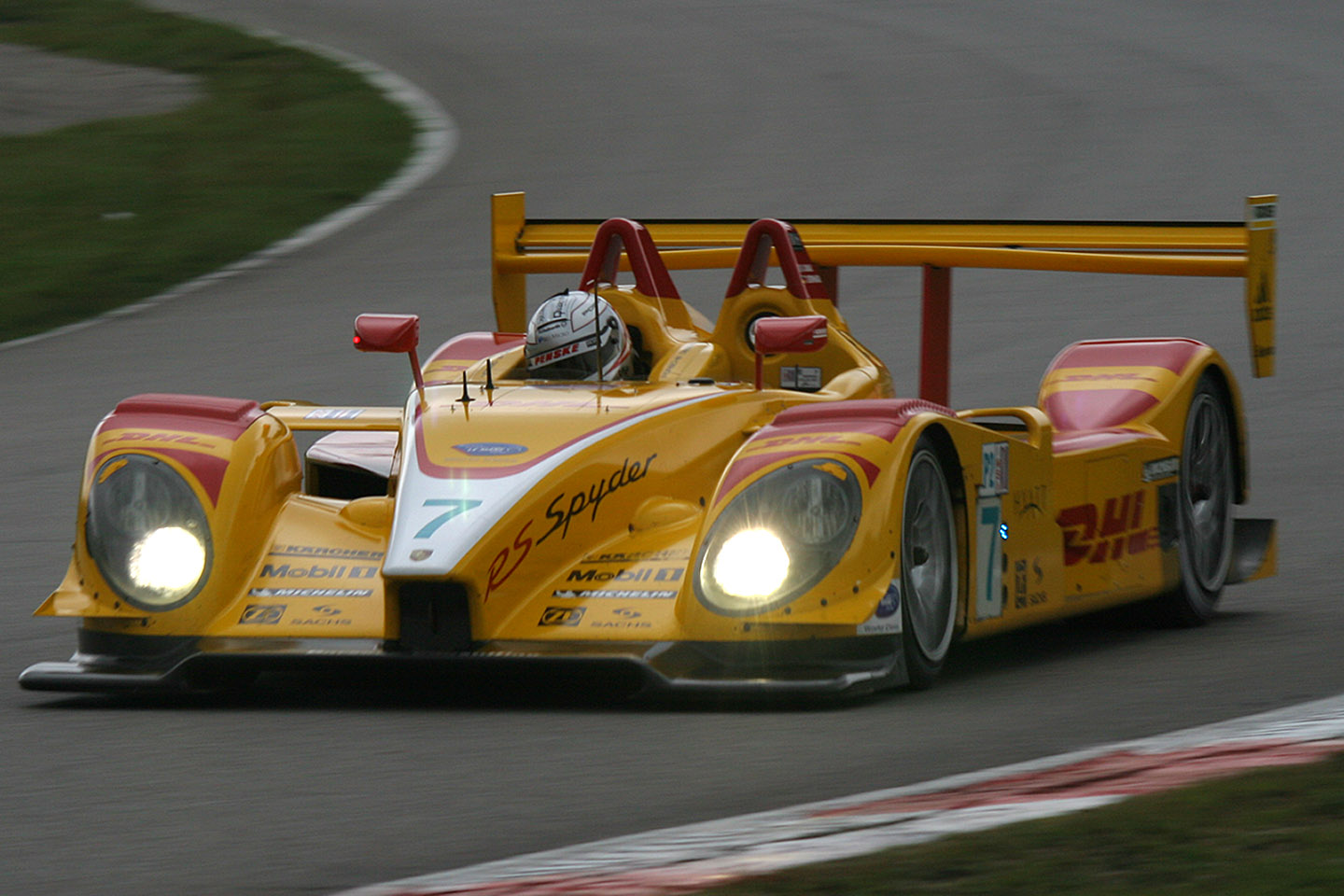
Romain Dumas and Timo Bernhard were outright winners in 2007.

Season	Class	Winning drivers	Team	Chassis-Engine	Ref
2006	LMP1	(Italy) Rinaldo Capello (United Kingdom) Allan McNish	(United States) Audi Sport North America	Audi R8	
2006	GT1	(United Kingdom) Oliver Gavin (Monaco) Olivier Beretta	(United States) Corvette Racing	Chevrolet Corvette C6.R	
2006	GT2	(Germany) Mike Rockenfeller (Germany) Klaus Graf	(United States) Alex Job Racing	Porsche 911 GT3-RSR	
2006	LMP2	(United States) Clint Field (United States) Liz Halliday	(United States) Intersport Racing	Lola B05/40-AER	
2007	LMP2	(France) Romain Dumas (Germany) Timo Bernhard	(United States) Penske Racing	Porsche RS Spyder	
2007	LMP1	(Italy) Rinaldo Capello (United Kingdom) Allan McNish	(United States) Audi Sport North America	Audi R10 TDI	
2007	GT1	(United States) Johnny O'Connell (Denmark) Jan Magnussen	(United States) Corvette Racing	Chevrolet Corvette C6.R	
2007	GT2	(Finland) Mika Salo (Brazil) Jaime Melo	(United States) Risi Competizione	Ferrari F430GT	
