= 2007 Utah Grand Prix =

Track map of Miller Motorsports Park full circuit

The 2007 Utah Grand Prix was the fifth round of the 2007 American Le Mans Series season. It took place on May 19, 2007.

== Official results ==
Class winners in bold. Cars failing to complete 70% of winner's distance marked as Not Classified (NC).

Pos	Class	No	Team	Drivers	Chassis	Tyre	Laps
Pos	Class	No	Team	Drivers	Engine	Tyre	Laps
1	**LMP2**	**6**	**(United States) Penske Racing**	**(Germany) Sascha Maassen (Australia) Ryan Briscoe**	**Porsche RS Spyder Evo**	MI	**66**
1	**LMP2**	**6**	**(United States) Penske Racing**	**(Germany) Sascha Maassen (Australia) Ryan Briscoe**	**Porsche MR6 3.4L V8**	MI	**66**
2	**LMP1**	**1**	**(United States) Audi Sport North America**	**(Italy) Rinaldo Capello (United Kingdom) Allan McNish**	**Audi R10 TDI**	MI	**66**
2	**LMP1**	**1**	**(United States) Audi Sport North America**	**(Italy) Rinaldo Capello (United Kingdom) Allan McNish**	**Audi 5.5L TDI V12 (Diesel)**	MI	**66**
3	LMP2	7	(United States) Penske Racing	(France) Romain Dumas (Germany) Timo Bernhard	Porsche RS Spyder Evo	MI	66
3	LMP2	7	(United States) Penske Racing	(France) Romain Dumas (Germany) Timo Bernhard	Porsche MR6 3.4L V8	MI	66
4	LMP2	16	(United States) Dyson Racing	(United States) Butch Leitzinger (United Kingdom) Andy Wallace	Porsche RS Spyder Evo	MI	66
4	LMP2	16	(United States) Dyson Racing	(United States) Butch Leitzinger (United Kingdom) Andy Wallace	Porsche MR6 3.4L V8	MI	66
5	LMP2	20	(United States) Dyson Racing	(United States) Chris Dyson (United Kingdom) Guy Smith	Porsche RS Spyder Evo	MI	66
5	LMP2	20	(United States) Dyson Racing	(United States) Chris Dyson (United Kingdom) Guy Smith	Porsche MR6 3.4L V8	MI	66
6	LMP1	2	(United States) Audi Sport North America	(Italy) Emanuele Pirro (Germany) Marco Werner	Audi R10 TDI	MI	66
6	LMP1	2	(United States) Audi Sport North America	(Italy) Emanuele Pirro (Germany) Marco Werner	Audi 5.5L TDI V12 (Diesel)	MI	66
7	LMP2	15	(Mexico) Lowe's Fernández Racing	(Mexico) Adrián Fernández (Mexico) Luis Diaz	Lola B06/43	MI	61
7	LMP2	15	(Mexico) Lowe's Fernández Racing	(Mexico) Adrián Fernández (Mexico) Luis Diaz	Acura AL7R 3.4L V8	MI	61
8	**GT1**	**4**	**(United States) Corvette Racing**	**(United Kingdom) Oliver Gavin (Monaco) Olivier Beretta**	**Chevrolet Corvette C6.R**	MI	**61**
8	**GT1**	**4**	**(United States) Corvette Racing**	**(United Kingdom) Oliver Gavin (Monaco) Olivier Beretta**	**Chevrolet LS7-R 7.0L V8**	MI	**61**
9	GT1	3	(United States) Corvette Racing	(United States) Johnny O'Connell (Denmark) Jan Magnussen	Chevrolet Corvette C6.R	MI	61
9	GT1	3	(United States) Corvette Racing	(United States) Johnny O'Connell (Denmark) Jan Magnussen	Chevrolet LS7-R 7.0L V8	MI	61
10	LMP1	37	(United States) Intersport Racing	(United States) Jon Field (United States) Clint Field (United States) Richard Berry	Creation CA06/H	KU	60
10	LMP1	37	(United States) Intersport Racing	(United States) Jon Field (United States) Clint Field (United States) Richard Berry	Judd GV5 S2 5.0L V10	KU	60
11	**GT2**	**31**	**(United States) Petersen Motorsports (United States) White Lightning Racing**	**(Czech Republic) Tomáš Enge (United Kingdom) Darren Turner**	**Ferrari F430GT**	MI	**59**
11	**GT2**	**31**	**(United States) Petersen Motorsports (United States) White Lightning Racing**	**(Czech Republic) Tomáš Enge (United Kingdom) Darren Turner**	**Ferrari 4.0L V8**	MI	**59**
12	GT2	45	(United States) Flying Lizard Motorsports	(United States) Johannes van Overbeek (Germany) Jörg Bergmeister	Porsche 997 GT3-RSR	MI	58
12	GT2	45	(United States) Flying Lizard Motorsports	(United States) Johannes van Overbeek (Germany) Jörg Bergmeister	Porsche 3.8L Flat-6	MI	58
13	GT2	71	(United States) Tafel Racing	(Germany) Wolf Henzler (United Kingdom) Robin Liddell	Porsche 997 GT3-RSR	MI	58
13	GT2	71	(United States) Tafel Racing	(Germany) Wolf Henzler (United Kingdom) Robin Liddell	Porsche 3.8L Flat-6	MI	58
14	GT2	61	(United States) Risi Competizione	(Sweden) Niclas Jönsson (France) Éric Hélary	Ferrari F430GT	MI	58
14	GT2	61	(United States) Risi Competizione	(Sweden) Niclas Jönsson (France) Éric Hélary	Ferrari 4.0L V8	MI	58
15	GT2	48	(United States) Corse Motorsports	(Portugal) Rui Águas (Italy) Maurizio Mediani (United States) Steve Pruitt	Ferrari F430GT	MI	58
15	GT2	48	(United States) Corse Motorsports	(Portugal) Rui Águas (Italy) Maurizio Mediani (United States) Steve Pruitt	Ferrari 4.0L V8	MI	58
16	GT2	18	(United States) Rahal Letterman Racing	(United States) Tom Milner Jr. (Germany) Ralf Kelleners	Porsche 997 GT3-RSR	MI	58
16	GT2	18	(United States) Rahal Letterman Racing	(United States) Tom Milner Jr. (Germany) Ralf Kelleners	Porsche 3.8L Flat-6	MI	58
17	LMP1	12	(United States) Autocon Motorsports	(United States) Michael Lewis (United States) Brian Willman	Creation CA06/H	D	58
17	LMP1	12	(United States) Autocon Motorsports	(United States) Michael Lewis (United States) Brian Willman	Judd GV5 S2 5.0L V10	D	58
18	GT2	44	(United States) Flying Lizard Motorsports	(United States) Darren Law (United States) Seth Neiman	Porsche 997 GT3-RSR	MI	57
18	GT2	44	(United States) Flying Lizard Motorsports	(United States) Darren Law (United States) Seth Neiman	Porsche 3.8L Flat-6	MI	57
19	GT2	73	(United States) Tafel Racing	(United States) Jim Tafel (Germany) Dominik Farnbacher	Porsche 997 GT3-RSR	MI	57
19	GT2	73	(United States) Tafel Racing	(United States) Jim Tafel (Germany) Dominik Farnbacher	Porsche 3.8L Flat-6	MI	57
20	GT2	54	(United States) Team Trans Sport Racing	(United States) Tim Pappas (United States) Terry Borcheller	Porsche 997 GT3-RSR	Y	55
20	GT2	54	(United States) Team Trans Sport Racing	(United States) Tim Pappas (United States) Terry Borcheller	Porsche 3.8L Flat-6	Y	55
21	LMP2	9	(United States) Highcroft Racing	(Australia) David Brabham (Sweden) Stefan Johansson (United States) Duncan Dayton	Acura (Courage) ARX-01a	MI	47
21	LMP2	9	(United States) Highcroft Racing	(Australia) David Brabham (Sweden) Stefan Johansson (United States) Duncan Dayton	Acura AL7R 3.4L V8	MI	47
22 DNF	LMP2	8	(United States) B-K Motorsports (Japan) Mazdaspeed	(United States) Jamie Bach (United Kingdom) Ben Devlin	Lola B07/46	KU	44
22 DNF	LMP2	8	(United States) B-K Motorsports (Japan) Mazdaspeed	(United States) Jamie Bach (United Kingdom) Ben Devlin	Mazda MZR-R 2.0L Turbo I4	KU	44
23 DNF	GT2	62	(United States) Risi Competizione	(Finland) Mika Salo (Brazil) Jaime Melo	Ferrari F430GT	MI	35
23 DNF	GT2	62	(United States) Risi Competizione	(Finland) Mika Salo (Brazil) Jaime Melo	Ferrari 4.0L V8	MI	35
24 DNF	GT2	21	(United States) Panoz Team PTG	(United States) Bill Auberlen (United States) Joey Hand	Panoz Esperante GT-LM	Y	23
24 DNF	GT2	21	(United States) Panoz Team PTG	(United States) Bill Auberlen (United States) Joey Hand	Ford (Élan) 5.0L V8	Y	23
25 DNF	LMP2	26	(United States) Andretti Green Racing	(United States) Bryan Herta (United Kingdom) Marino Franchitti	Acura (Courage) ARX-01a	MI	20
25 DNF	LMP2	26	(United States) Andretti Green Racing	(United States) Bryan Herta (United Kingdom) Marino Franchitti	Acura AL7R 3.4L V8	MI	20
26 DNF	GT2	22	(United States) Panoz Team PTG	(Canada) Scott Maxwell (United States) Bryan Sellers	Panoz Esperante GT-LM	Y	3
26 DNF	GT2	22	(United States) Panoz Team PTG	(Canada) Scott Maxwell (United States) Bryan Sellers	Ford (Élan) 5.0L V8	Y	3

== Statistics ==
- Pole Position - #7 Penske Racing - 2:18.128
- Fastest Lap - #7 Penske Racing - 2:21.749

American Le Mans Series
Previous race: 2007 Lone Star Grand Prix	2007 season	Next race: 2007 Northeast Grand Prix
