= Nicky Pastorelli =

Dutch racing driver

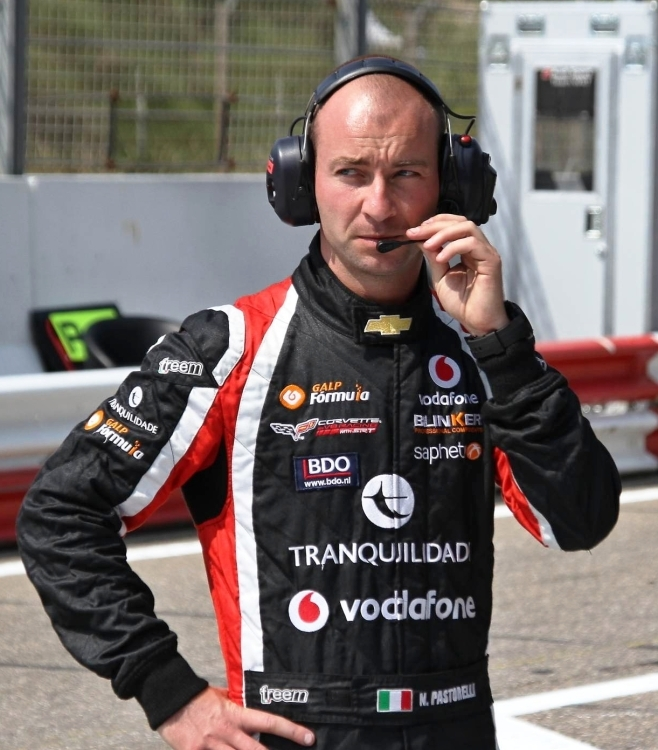
- Nationality: Dutch
- Born: 11 April 1983 (age 43) The Hague, Netherlands
- Relatives: Francesco Pastorelli (brother)
- Categorisation: FIA Platinum (until 2018); FIA Gold (2019–)
- Achievements: 2004 Euro Formula 3000 Champion

Champ Car career
- 9 races run over 1 year
- Years active: 2006
- Team: Rocketsports
- Best finish: 17th - 2006
- First race: 2006 Grand Prix of Houston (Reliant Park)
- Last race: 2006 Champ Car Grand Prix de Montreal (Montreal)
Wins	Podiums	Poles
0	0	0

Nicky Pastorelli (born 11 April 1983) is a Dutch professional racing driver.

== Motorsports career ==
=== Euro Formula 3000 ===
Born in The Hague, Pastorelli participated in Euro Formula 3000 for Scuderia Fama in 2003. He finished on the podium twice and placed fifth in the season championship.

For 2004, Pastorelli signed with the defending champion Draco Junior Team. Pastorelli won the championship by one point over Fabrizio Del Monte with two wins among six podium finishes in the ten series races.

=== Formula One testing ===
This result gained him a Formula One test at Minardi, and in 2005 Pastorelli was appointed official Jordan Grand Prix test driver, and was the first driver in the Young Driver Development Program of MF1 Racing. However, none of these tests resulted in a Formula One race drive for Pastorelli.

=== Champ Car ===
Pastorelli made his debut at Grand Prix of Houston in the second race of the season, in Rocketsports' only entry. He qualified 16th of the 17 cars, and retired after 29 laps with a mechanical failure. His first finish, in 15th, came in the next race at Grand Prix of Monterrey, and in his first and only oval start at the Milwaukee Mile he finished tenth. His best Champ Car finish came in his final race in the series at the Grand Prix of Montreal. He was replaced for the final three races of the season by veteran Mario Domínguez.

=== American Le Mans Series ===
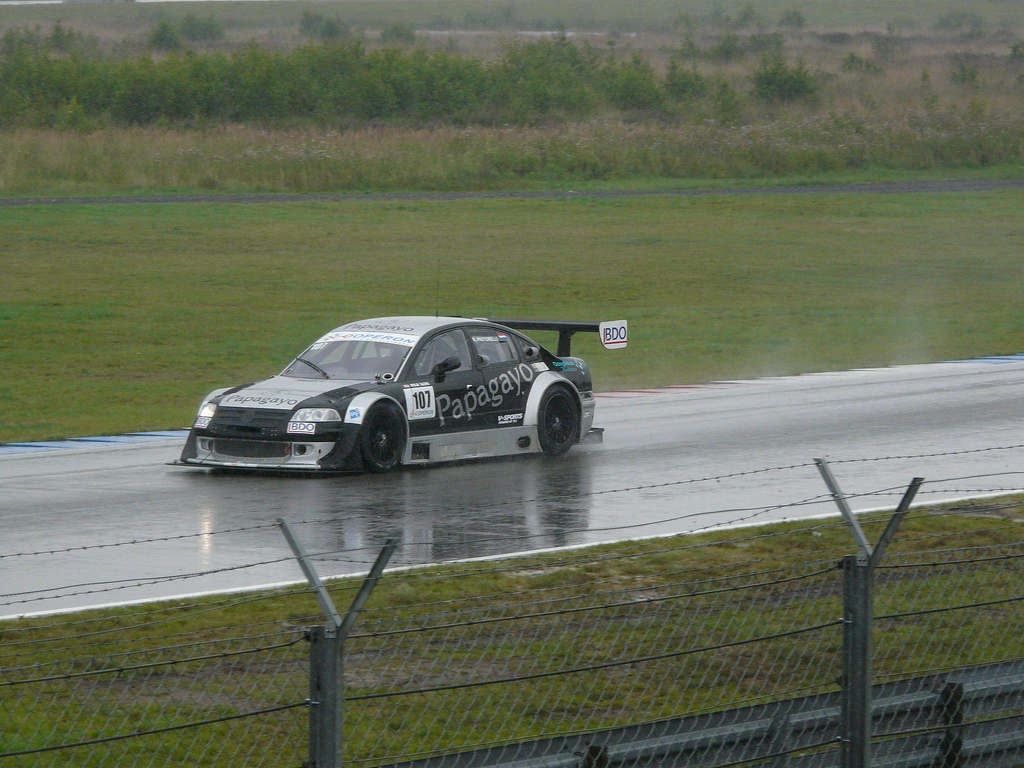
Pastorelli's 2008 Dutch Supercar

In 2008 and 2009, Pastorelli has competed in the GT2 class of the American Le Mans Series for VICI Racing in a Porsche 911 GT3. In 2008, he also finished third in the GT class of the Dutch Supercar Challenge in a Volkswagen Passat.

=== Career summary ===
- 2000

Formula Arcobaleno Netherlands, Competed in six out of eight races: five wins, three poles, third place in Championship

- 2001

Italian Formula Renault 2000 - 18th place

- 2002

European Formula Renault 2000 - nine race starts, no points

- 2003

Euro Formula 3000 Series: two second place finishes and fifth in the championship

- 2004

Superfund Euro 3000 - Championship winner, two victories
Champ Car Test with Walker Racing at Sebring International Raceway

- 2005

Formula 1 test with Minardi at Misano (January)
Official Jordan F1 test driver and in Young Driver Development Program of Midland F1

- 2006

Official 3rd driver — Midland F1
Champ Car — Partial season driving with Rocketsports Racing in Champ Car. - 17th place

- 2008

Dutch Supercar Challenge - Papagayo Racing, Volkswagen Passat V8 STAR - third place
American Le Mans Series GT2 - VICI Racing, Porsche 911 GT3 RSR - 22nd place (GT2 drivers championship)

- 2009

American Le Mans Series GT2 - VICI Racing, Porsche 911 GT3 RSR

== Motorsports career results ==
=== Complete Formula Renault 2.0 Italia results ===
(key) (Races in bold indicate pole position) (Races in italics indicate fastest lap)

Year	Entrant	1	2	3	4	5	6	7	8	9	10	DC	Points
2001	Drumel Motorsport	VLL; 20	PER; Ret	MGI; Ret	MNZ; 16	MIS; Ret	VAR; 4	IMO; 16	MUG; 17	BIN	EST	18th	16
2002	Facondini Racing	VLL	PER; 10	PER; Ret	SPA; 6	MGI	MNZ	VAR	IMO	MIS	MUG	21st	12

=== Complete Formula Renault 2.0 Eurocup results ===
(key) (Races in bold indicate pole position) (Races in italics indicate fastest lap)

Year	Entrant	1	2	3	4	5	6	7	8	9	DC	Points
2002	Facondini Racing	MAG; 36	SIL; Ret	JAR; Ret	AND; Ret	OSC; 17	SPA; Ret	IMO; Ret	DON; 14	EST; 14	37th	0

=== Complete Euro Formula 3000 results ===
(key) (Races in bold indicate pole position) (Races in italics indicate fastest lap)

Year	Entrant	1	2	3	4	5	6	7	8	9	10	DC	Points
2003	Scuderia Famà	NÜR; 8	MAG; 5	PER; 2	MNZ; 7	SPA; 7	DON; 2	BRN; DNS	JER; 4	CAG; 5		5th	19
2004	Draco Junior Team	BRN; 3	EST; 2	JER; 6	MNZ; 1	SPA; 2	DON; 5	DIJ; 4	ZOL; Ret	NÜR1; 3	NÜR2; 1	1st	46

=== American Open Wheel racing ===
(key)

==== Complete Champ Car results ====
Yr	Team	No.	1	2	3	4	5	6	7	8	9	10	11	12	13	14	Rank	Points	Ref
2006	Rocketsports	8	LBH	HOU; 17	MTY; 15	MIL; 10	POR; 17	CLE; 17	TOR	EDM; 17	SJO; 10	DEN; 12	MTL; 6	ROA	SRF	MXC	**17th**	**73**	

=== Complete GT1 World Championship results ===
Year	Team	Car	1	2	3	4	5	6	7	8	9	10	11	12	13	14	15	16	17	18	19	20	Pos	Points
2010	All-Inkl.com Münnich Motorsport	Lamborghini	ABU; QR; Ret	ABU; CR; Ret	SIL; QR; 20	SIL; CR; 12	BRN; QR; 4	BRN; CR; 7	PRI; QR; 15	PRI; CR; 12	SPA; QR; 5	SPA; CR; 9	NÜR; QR; 11	NÜR; CR; Ret	ALG; QR; 8	ALG; CR; Ret	NAV; QR; Ret	NAV; CR; 9	INT; QR; 5	INT; CR; 7	SAN; QR; 9	SAN; CR; 11	32nd	16
2011	All-Inkl.com Münnich Motorsport	Lamborghini	ABU; QR; Ret	ABU; CR; 11	ZOL; QR; Ret	ZOL; CR; Ret	ALG; QR; 5	ALG; CR; 4	SAC; QR; 7	SAC; CR; 2	SIL; QR; 6	SIL; CR; 10	NAV; QR; 2	NAV; CR; 1	PRI; QR; Ret	PRI; CR; 9	ORD; QR; 6	ORD; CR; 6	BEI; QR; 9	BEI; CR; Ret	SAN; QR; 3	SAN; CR; Ret	8th	80
2012	All-Inkl.com Münnich Motorsport	Mercedes-Benz	NOG; QR; 7	NOG; CR; 4	ZOL; QR; 2	ZOL; CR; 4	NAV; QR; 6	NAV; QR; 3	SVK; QR; 8	SVK; CR; 10	ALG; QR; 6	ALG; CR; 1	SVK; QR; 4	SVK; CR; 8	MOS; QR; 5	MOS; CR; 8	NUR; QR; 6	NUR; CR; 8	DON; QR; 6	DON; CR; 6			6th	100

* Season still in progress.

Sporting positions
Preceded by Augusto Farfus	Superfund Euro Formula 3000 champion 2004	Succeeded by Luca Filippi
