= Porsche RS Spyder =

2005 LMP2 racing car by Porsche

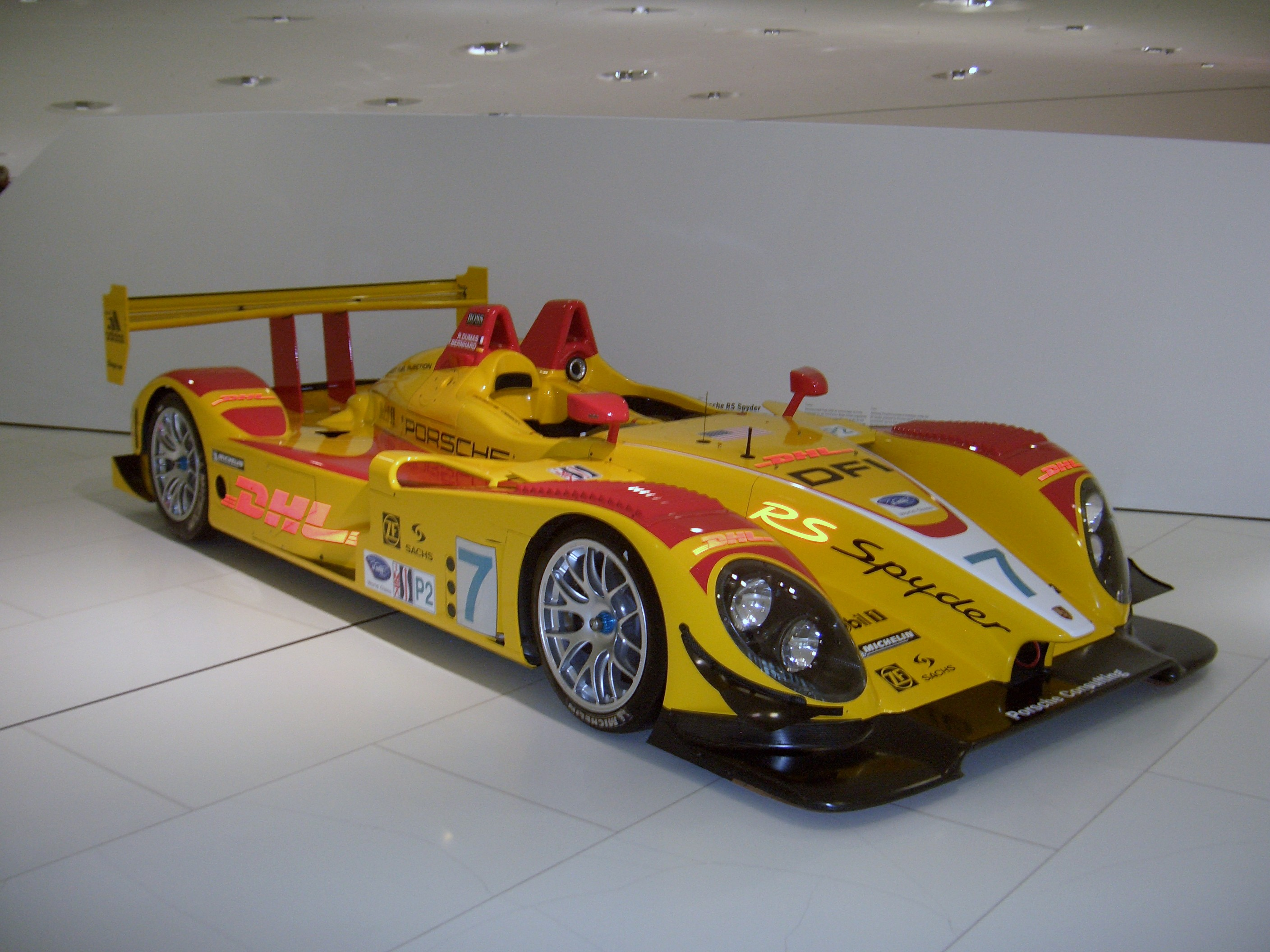
- Category: Le Mans Prototype
- Constructor: Porsche with CarboTech
- Designers: Michael Mauer (styling); Michael Pfadenhauer (aerodynamicist); Dieter Steinhauser (engineer, mechanical); Thomas Laudenbach (engine designer)
- Predecessor: Porsche LMP1-98 (LMP), Porsche 911 GT1-98 (LM-GT1), Porsche LMP2000 (cancelled LMP)
- Successor: Porsche 919 Hybrid (LMP1); Porsche 963 (LMDh)

Technical specifications
- Chassis: Carbon fibre monocoque with engine and gearbox as stressed members
- Suspension (front): Independent four-way, spring/damper units activated by pushrods, adjustable torsion-bar springs, dampers and anti-roll bars
- Suspension (rear): As front
- Length: 4,650 mm (183 in)
- Width: 2,000 mm (79 in)
- Height: 1,030 mm (41 in)
- Wheelbase: 2,900 mm (114 in)
- Engine: Porsche MR6 3,397 cc (3.4 L; 207.3 cu in) 90-degree V8 normally aspirated, 32-valve, DOHC, four-valves per cylinder mid-engine, longitudinally mounted
- Transmission: GR6 6-speed electro-pneumatic actuated paddle-shift sequential gearbox Mechanical locking differential plus traction control
- Weight: 825 kg (1,819 lb)
- Fuel: EPIC Ethanol E10 + VP Racing Fuels unleaded gasoline 90% (ALMS); ExxonMobil unleaded (24 Hours of Le Mans)
- Lubricants: Mobil 1
- Tyres: Michelin, Dunlop

Competition history
- Notable entrants: (Germany) / (United States) DHL Porsche Penske Racing (Denmark) Team Essex (Switzerland) Horag Racing (United States) Dyson Racing (Netherlands) Van Merksteijn Motorsport (United States) Muscle Milk Team Cytosport (Japan) Team Goh
- Notable drivers: (Brazil) Hélio Castroneves (Australia) Ryan Briscoe (Germany) Lucas Luhr (Germany) Timo Bernhard (France) Romain Dumas (France) Emmanuel Collard (Switzerland) Fredy Lienhard (Netherlands) Jos Verstappen (Netherlands) Jeroen Bleekemolen (Germany) Sascha Maassen (Belgium) Didier Theys (United States) Patrick Long (United Kingdom) Marino Franchitti (United Kingdom) Guy Smith (United Kingdom) Andy Wallace (Netherlands) Jan Lammers (United States) Butch Leitzinger (United States) Chris Dyson (United States) Andy Lally
- Debut: 2005 Monterey Sports Car Championships at Laguna Seca
Races	Wins	Poles	F/Laps
63	13	10	12
- Teams' Championships: 4 (American Le Mans 2006, 2007, 2008 & Le Mans Series 2008) LMP2
- Constructors' Championships: 4 (American Le Mans 2006, 2007, 2008 & Le Mans Series 2008) LMP2
- Drivers' Championships: 4 (American Le Mans 2006, 2007, 2008 & Le Mans Series 2008) LMP2

The RS Spyder (Type 9R6) is a racing car designed by Porsche in conjunction with Penske to compete in Le Mans Prototype Class 2 (LMP2) racing. The car takes its name from the legendary Porsche 550 Spyder of the 1950s (combined with Porsche's common "RennSport" (lit.: racing sports) designation). The car marked Porsche's first return to the top level of sports prototype racing since the firm abandoned its Porsche LMP in 1999.

The RS Spyder made its debut in the final event of the 2005 American Le Mans Series (ALMS) at Laguna Seca winning its class. Since then the RS Spyder has won the ALMS LMP2 Championship in 2006, 2007 and 2008 and took class honours at Le Mans in 2008 and 2009. The outright victory at the 2008 12 Hours of Sebring was the first major victory for Porsche in endurance racing for five years and it was also the first time in 14 years that the non-premier class won the 12 Hours of Sebring overall. Regulation changes for the 2011 season rendered the RS Spyder obsolete but the car has left a legacy in the Porsche 918 Spyder, which uses a development of the RS Spyder's engine and the Porsche 919 Hybrid which carried Porsche's racing program on into the LMP1 category starting in 2014.

== Design ==
The RS Spyder was designed completely in-house by Porsche engineers with help from Carbotech. The chassis is a rigid carbon fibre monocoque with both the engine and transmission being integral stressed members. The 3.4-litre 90-degree MR6 V8 racing engine was designed from scratch as was the six-speed electro-pneumatic sequential gearbox. Braking is via six-piston aluminum monobloc calipers and carbon ceramic discs, mounted on suspension controlled by four-way adjustable spring/damper units activated by pushrods with adjustable torsion-bar springs. The car has a dry weight of 825 kilograms (1,819 lb) in 2010 specification but was initially 750 kilograms (1,650 lb).

Since its introduction in 2005, the engine, which initially produced 478 horsepower (356 kW), has been developed and modified to meet the changing regulations of both the ALMS and the ACO. For 2008, the engine developed 503 horsepower (375 kW) using sequential multipoint inject and 440 horsepower (330 kW) in 2009-spec, with air restrictor limitations.

== Race results ==
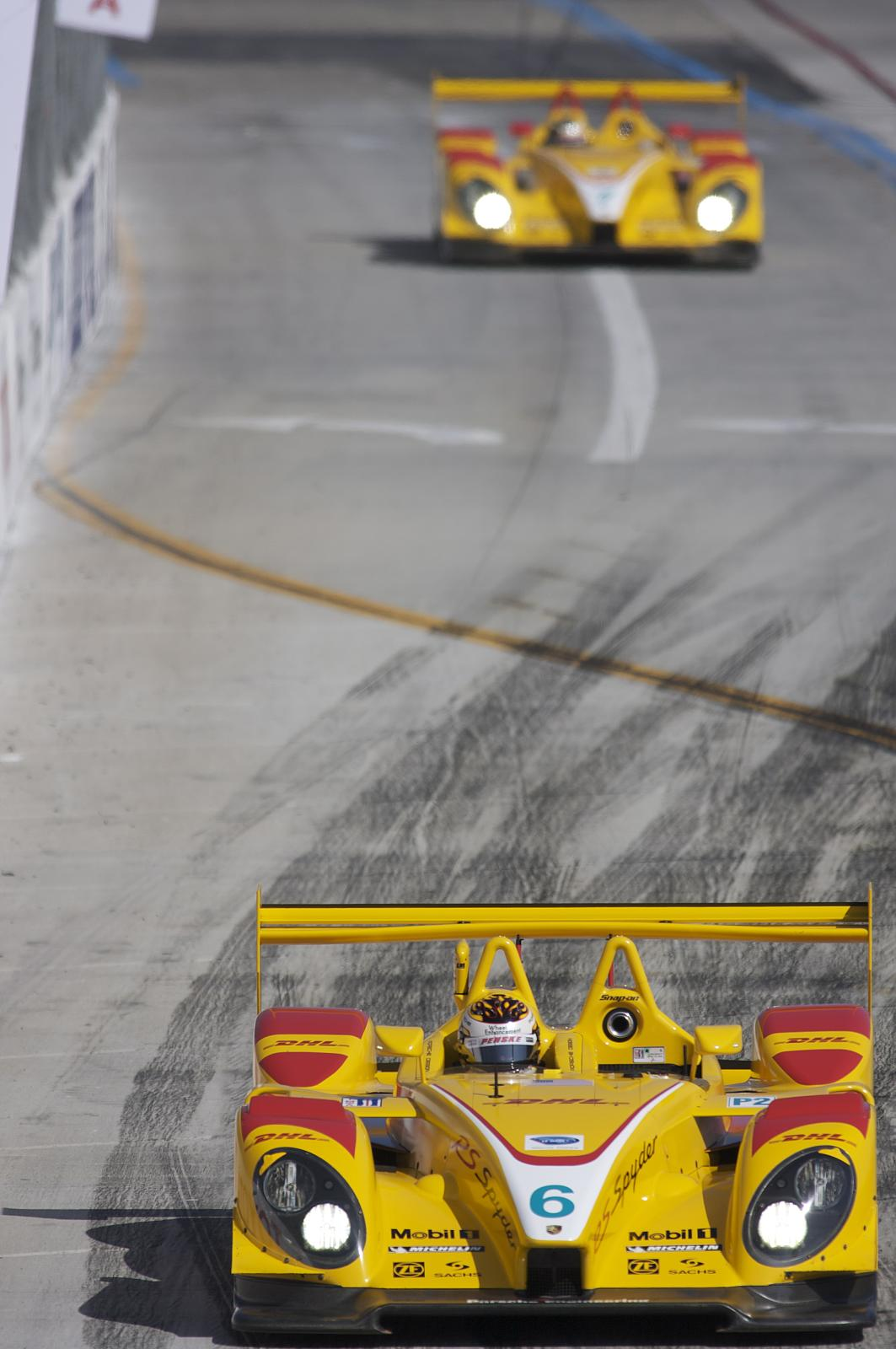
Two Penske RS Spyders at the 2008 Long Beach ALMS race

=== 2005 ===
The RS Spyder made its race debut at the final round of the 2005 American Le Mans Series, the Monterey Sports Car Championship at Mazda Raceway Laguna Seca, entered by Penske Racing and driven by Lucas Luhr and Sascha Maassen from the Porsche Junioren factory team. The sole RS Spyder finished first in class and fifth overall.

=== 2006 ===
During 2006, Penske entered two RS Spyders in the ALMS and won seven class victories including an outright victory at the Mid-Ohio race. This was the first LMP2 victory in a race since 2003 and the first major result for Porsche since the 1998 24 Hours of Le Mans. The results ensure victory for Penske in the LMP2 Championship and also for Sascha Maassen in the drivers' standings.

=== 2007 ===
For 2007, Porsche unveiled the 2007-spec RS Spyder (known as the RS Spyder Evo), which included an increase in power to 503 horsepower (375 kW). Dyson Racing joined Penske in the ALMS. 2007 would be the most successful year for the RS Spyder with Penske repeating their outright victory in the ALMS series a further eight times and also securing an additional three class victories. Penske again won the LMP2 class in ALMS and Romain Dumas won the LMP2 Drivers Championship. During the season the RS Spyder won eight races while the Audi R10 TDI from the largest P1 class won only four.

=== 2008 ===
Rule changes increased the RS Spyder's weight to 825 kg and Porsche introduce a new direct injection engine developing 503 horsepower (375 kW). A Penske car driven by Timo Bernhard, Romain Dumas, and Emmanuel Collard, secured the overall victory at the 2008 12 Hours of Sebring, winning it on the 20th anniversary of Porsche's last overall win at the race. Penske had another outright victory at the Utah Grand Prix and also recorded an additional three class wins. At Petit Le Mans a 3rd RS Spyder was entered by Penske in an attempt to lock out the manufacturers' championship against Acura. Penske won both the LMP2 Team and drivers' championship for Timo Bernhard and Romain Dumas. Porsche won the manufacturers' championship by 1 point ahead of Acura.

Danish Team Essex together with Van Merksteijn Motorsport of The Netherlands and Horag Racing of Switzerland participate in the Le Mans Series (LMS) all with 2008-spec RS Spyder. Team Essex and Van Merksteijn also entered the 24 Hours of Le Mans, marking the debut for the RS Spyder at the event. An RS Spyder from Van Merksteijn Motorsport driven by Jeroen Bleekemolen, Peter van Merksteijn and Jos Verstappen, came first in class and 10th overall with the Essex team coming second in class (12th overall). A RS Spyder won its class in every LMS race giving it a 1-2-3 in the LMP2 standing and securing the drivers championship for Jos Verstappen and the Team championship for Van Merksteijn Motorsport.

=== 2009 ===
New restrictor rules brought the RS Spyder's power down to approximately 440 horsepower (330 kW), and the wingspan was limited by the rules, effectively decreasing downforce.

Penske did not compete in the ALMS in 2009 but Team CytoSport, who had previously competed in LMP1 in 2007, purchased an ex-Dyson Racing RS Spyder and took part in four races with a best result of second in class at Road America.

In LMS, Team Essex only competed in the 1000 km race at Spa taking the class victory and also securing the class victory at Le Mans, finishing 10th overall with Casper Elgaard, Kristian Poulsen and Emmanuel Collard at the wheel. Team Goh also took part in the race with an ex-Van Merksteijn Motorsport car.

=== 2010 ===
CytoSport announced in February 2010 that it would contest the full ALMS in a RS Spyder. It was also announced that Sascha Maassen would join the regular drivers Klaus Graf and Greg Pickett at the longer races at Sebring, Laguna Seca and Road Atlanta. Cytosport used a full-width rear wing for the entire season, unlike arch-rivals Highcroft HPD. The CytoSport RS Spyder won the LMP2 class at the 12 Hours of Sebring and took their first outright victory at Northeast Grand Prix at Lime Rock. CytoSport continued their winning success by taking outright victory at a shortened race at Mosport. They also finished the season second behind Patrón Highcroft Racing in the championship and Klaus Graf finished second in the drivers' standings.

No RS Spyders were entered in the 2010 24 Hours of Le Mans. The 2011 LMP2 regulations rendered the RS Spyder obsolete due to the costs exceeding the LMP2 budget limit.

== Competition history ==
=== Complete American Le Mans Series results ===
(key) Races in bold indicates pole position. Races in italics indicates fastest lap.

Complete American Le Mans Series results
Year	Entrant	Class	Drivers	No.	Rds.	Rounds												Pts.	Pos.
Year	Entrant	Class	Drivers	No.	Rds.	1	2	3	4	5	6	7	8	9	10	11	12	Pts.	Pos.
2005	(United States) Penske Racing	LMP2	(Germany) Lucas Luhr (Germany) Sascha Maassen	6	10; 10	SEB	ATL	MID	LIM	SON	POR	AME	MOS	PET	MON; 1			23	5th
2006	(United States) Penske Racing	LMP2	(Germany) Sascha Maassen (Germany) Lucas Luhr (France) Emmanuel Collard (Germany) Timo Bernhard	6	All; 1-6; 1, 9–10; 7-9	SEB; 2†	TEX; 3†	MID; 2	LIM; 2	UTA; 1	POR; 2†	AME; 1	MOS; 2	PET; 1	MON; 2			200	1st
2006	(United States) Penske Racing	LMP2	(France) Romain Dumas (Germany) Timo Bernhard (United States) Patrick Long (Germany) Lucas Luhr (Germany) Mike Rockenfeller	7	All; 1-6; 1; 7-10; 9	SEB; Ret	TEX; 5†	**MID**; **1**	**LIM**; **1**	UTA; 3	POR; 3	AME; 2	MOS; 1	PET; 2	MON; 1			200	1st
2007	(United States) Penske Racing	LMP2	(Germany) Sascha Maassen (Australia) Ryan Briscoe (France) Emmanuel Collard	6	All; All; 1, 11	SEB; 8	**STP**; **1**	LNB; 2	TEX; 3	**UTA**; **1**	**LIM**; **1**	MID; 2	AME; 2	MOS; 2	DET; 7	PET; 5	MON; 2	251	1st
2007	(United States) Penske Racing	LMP2	(Germany) Timo Bernhard (France) Romain Dumas (Brazil) Hélio Castroneves (United States) Patrick Long	7	All; All; 1; 11-12	SEB; 2	STP; 2	LNB; 1	TEX; 1	UTA; 2	LIM; 2	**MID**; **1**	AME; 1	MOS; 1	**DET**; **1**	PET; 1	**MON**; **1**	251	1st
2007	(United States) Dyson Racing Team	LMP2	(United Kingdom) Andy Wallace (United States) Butch Leitzinger (United States) Andy Lally	16	All; All; 1, 11	SEB; 5	STP; 5	LNB; 3	TEX; 6	UTA; 3	LIM; 5	MID; 4	AME; 5	MOS; 7	DET; 2	PET; 4	MON; 6	146	2nd
2007	(United States) Dyson Racing Team	LMP2	(United States) Chris Dyson (United Kingdom) Guy Smith	20	All; All	SEB; 6	STP; 6†	LNB; 5	TEX; 5	UTA; 4	LIM; 4	MID; 5	AME; 4	MOS; 5	DET; 5	PET; 2	MON; 5	146	2nd
2008	(United States) Penske Motorsports, Inc.	LMP2	(Australia) Ryan Briscoe (Brazil) Hélio Castroneves	5	10-11; 10-11	SEB	STP	LBH	UTA	LRP	MDO	ELK	MOS	DET	**PET**; **1**	LAG; 4		45	7th
2008	(United States) Penske Racing	LMP2	(United States) Patrick Long (Germany) Sascha Maassen (Australia) Ryan Briscoe	6	All; 1-8, 10–11; 1, 9	SEB; Ret	STP; 3	LBH; 3	UTA; 2	LRP; 3	MDO; 4	ELK; 4	MOS; 3	DET; 5	PET; 3	LAG; 8		210	1st
2008	(United States) Penske Racing	LMP2	(Germany) Timo Bernhard (France) Romain Dumas (France) Emmanuel Collard	7	All; All; 1	SEB; 1	STP; 1	LBH; 2	**UTA**; **1**	LRP; 2	MDO; 1	ELK; 2	MOS; 7†	DET; 4	PET; 2	LAG; 3		210	1st
2008	(United States) Dyson Racing Team	LMP2	(United States) Chris Dyson (United Kingdom) Guy Smith	16	All; All	SEB; 3	STP; 4	LBH; 7	UTA; 6	LRP; Ret	MDO; 5	ELK; 6	MOS; 7	DET; 6	PET; 6	LAG; 5		129	3rd
2008	(United States) Dyson Racing Team	LMP2	(United Kingdom) Andy Wallace (United States) Butch Leitzinger (United States) Andy Lally	20	All; All; 1, 10	SEB; 2	STP; 8†	LBH; 5	UTA; 4	LRP; 6†	MDO; 6	ELK; 3	MOS; 8	DET; 8	PET; 4	LAG; 6		129	3rd
2008	(Switzerland) Horag Lista Racing	LMP2	(Switzerland) Fredy Lienhard (Belgium) Didier Theys (Netherlands) Jan Lammers	27	1; 1; 1	SEB; 5	STP	LBH	UTA	LRP	MDO	ELK	MOS	DET	PET	LAG		18	9th
2009	(United States) Team Cytosport	LMP2	(Germany) Klaus Graf (United States) Greg Pickett (Germany) Sascha Maassen	6	6-7, 9–10; 6-7, 9–10; 9	SEB	STP	LBH	UTA	LIM	MOH; 2	ELK; 3	MOS	ATL; 3	LGA; 2†			0	NC
2010	(United States) Muscle Milk Team Cytosport	LMP2	(Germany) Klaus Graf (United States) Greg Pickett (Germany) Sascha Maassen (Germany) Lucas Luhr	6	1, 9; 1; 1, 9; 9	SEB; 1								ATL; 2				162	2nd
2010	(United States) Muscle Milk Team Cytosport	LMP	(Germany) Klaus Graf (United States) Greg Pickett (Germany) Sascha Maassen (Germany) Timo Bernhard (France) Romain Dumas	6	2-8; 2, 4-5; 3; 7; 8		LBH; 3	LGA; 2	MIL; 3	LRP; 1	MDO; DNS	ROA; 2	**MOS**; **1**					162	2nd

^{†} Did not finish the race but was classified as they completed more than 70% of the race distance.

=== Complete Le Mans Series results ===
(key) Races in bold indicates pole position. Races in italics indicates fastest lap.

Complete Le Mans Series results
Year	Entrant	Class	Drivers	No.	Rds.	Rounds					Pts.	Pos.
Year	Entrant	Class	Drivers	No.	Rds.	1	2	3	4	5	Pts.	Pos.
2008	(Switzerland) Horag Racing	LMP2	(Netherlands) Jan Lammers (Switzerland) Fredy Lienhard (Belgium) Didier Theys	27	All; All; All	CAT; 6	MON; 3	SPA; 2	NUR; 12	SIL; 2	32	2nd
2008	(Denmark) Team Essex	LMP2	(Denmark) Casper Elgaard (Denmark) John Nielsen	31	All; All	CAT; 3	MON; 1	SPA; 3	NUR; 3	SIL; 5	25	3rd
2008	(Netherlands) Van Merksteijn Motorsport	LMP2	(Netherlands) Jos Verstappen (Netherlands) Peter van Merksteijn Sr. (Netherlands) Jeroen Bleekemolen	34	All; 1-3, 5; 4	**CAT**; **1**	**MON**; **2**	**SPA**; **1**	**NUR**; **1**	**SIL**; **1**	48	1st
2009	(Denmark) Team Essex	LMP2	(France) Emmanuel Collard (Denmark) Casper Elgaard (Denmark) Kristian Poulsen	31	2; 2; 2	CAT	**SPA**; **1**	POR	NÜR	SIL	11	7th

=== Complete 24 Hours of Le Mans results ===
(key) Races in bold indicates pole position. Races in italics indicates fastest lap.

Complete 24 Hours of Le Mans results
Year	Team	Class	No.	Drivers	Position
2008	(Denmark) Team Essex	LMP2	31	(Denmark) Casper Elgaard (Denmark) John Nielsen (Germany) Sascha Maassen	2nd
2008	(Netherlands) Van Merksteijn Motorsport	LMP2	34	(Netherlands) Peter van Merksteijn (Netherlands) Jeroen Bleekemolen (Netherlands) Jos Verstappen	**1st**
2009	(Japan) Navi Team Goh	LMP2	5	(Japan) Seiji Ara (Japan) Keisuke Kunimoto (Germany) Sascha Maassen	Ret
2009	(Denmark) Team Essex	LMP2	31	(Denmark) Casper Elgaard (Denmark) Kristian Poulsen (France) Emmanuel Collard	**1st**

=== Legends of Le Mans Series results ===
(key)

Complete Legends of Le Mans Series results
Year	Entrant	Class	Drivers	No.	Rds.	Rounds								
Year	Entrant	Class	Drivers	No.	Rds.	1	2	3	4	5	6	7	8	9
2026	(Monaco) JMB Racing	LMP2	(France) François Perrodo	83	1-2	**IMO**; **1**	**IMO**; **1**	**SPA**; **1**	**SPA**; **1**	**LMS**	**LMS**	**LMS**	**BAH**	**BAH**

== Race victories ==
Year	Type	Championship	Race	Team	Drivers
2005	Class	ALMS	Monterey Sports Car Championships	Penske Racing	Lucas Luhr / Sascha Maassen
2006	Overall	ALMS	**American Le Mans at Mid-Ohio**	Penske Racing	Timo Bernhard / Romain Dumas
2006	Class	ALMS	**New England Grand Prix**	Penske Racing	Timo Bernhard / Romain Dumas
2006	Class	ALMS	Utah Grand Prix	Penske Racing	Lucas Luhr / Sascha Maassen
2006	Class	ALMS	Road America 500	Penske Racing	Sascha Maassen / Timo Bernhard
2006	Class	ALMS	Grand Prix of Mosport	Penske Racing	Lucas Luhr / Romain Dumas
2006	Class	ALMS	Petit Le Mans	Penske Racing	Sascha Maassen / Timo Bernhard / Emmanuel Collard
2006	Class	ALMS	Monterey Sports Car Championships	Penske Racing	Lucas Luhr / Romain Dumas
2007	Class	ALMS	**Sports Car Challenge of St. Petersburg**	Penske Racing	Sascha Maassen / Ryan Briscoe
2007	Overall	ALMS	ALMS Grand Prix of Long Beach	Penske Racing	Romain Dumas / Timo Bernhard
2007	Overall	ALMS	Lone Star Grand Prix	Penske Racing	Romain Dumas / Timo Bernhard
2007	Overall	ALMS	**Utah Grand Prix**	Penske Racing	Sascha Maassen / Ryan Briscoe
2007	Overall	ALMS	**Northeast Grand Prix**	Penske Racing	Sascha Maassen / Ryan Briscoe
2007	Overall	ALMS	**Sports Car Challenge of Mid-Ohio**	Penske Racing	Romain Dumas / Timo Bernhard
2007	Overall	ALMS	Road America 500	Penske Racing	Romain Dumas / Timo Bernhard
2007	Overall	ALMS	Grand Prix of Mosport	Penske Racing	Romain Dumas / Timo Bernhard
2007	Overall	ALMS	**Detroit Sports Car Challenge**	Penske Racing	Romain Dumas / Timo Bernhard
2007	Class	ALMS	Petit Le Mans	Penske Racing	Romain Dumas / Timo Bernhard / Patrick Long
2007	Class	ALMS	**Monterey Sports Car Championships**	Penske Racing	Romain Dumas / Timo Bernhard
2008	Overall	ALMS	12 Hours of Sebring	Penske Racing	Romain Dumas / Timo Bernhard / Emmanuel Collard
2008	Class	ALMS	Sports Car Challenge of St. Petersburg	Penske Racing	Romain Dumas / Timo Bernhard
2008	Class	ELMS	1000 km of Catalunya	Van Merksteijn Motorsport	Peter van Merksteijn Sr. / Jos Verstappen
2008	Class	ELMS	1000 km of Monza	Team Essex	Casper Elgaard / John Nielsen
2008	Class	ELMS	1000 km of Spa	Van Merksteijn Motorsport	Peter van Merksteijn Sr. / Jos Verstappen
2008	Overall	ALMS	**Utah Grand Prix**	Penske Racing	Romain Dumas / Timo Bernhard
2008	Class		24 Hours of Le Mans	Van Merksteijn Motorsport	Peter van Merksteijn Sr. / Jeroen Bleekemolen / Jos Verstappen
2008	Class	ALMS	Sports Car Challenge of Mid-Ohio	Penske Racing	Romain Dumas / Timo Bernhard
2008	Class	ELMS	1000 km of Nürburgring	Van Merksteijn Motorsport	Jos Verstappen / Jeroen Bleekemolen
2008	Class	ELMS	2008 1000 km of Silverstone	Van Merksteijn Motorsport	Peter van Merksteijn Sr. / Jos Verstappen
2008	Class	ALMS	Petit Le Mans	Penske Racing	Hélio Castroneves / Ryan Briscoe
2009	Class	ELMS	1000 km of Spa	Team Essex	Casper Elgaard / Kristian Poulsen / Emmanuel Collard
2009	Class		24 Hours of Le Mans	Team Essex	Casper Elgaard / Kristian Poulsen / Emmanuel Collard
2010	Class	ALMS	12 Hours of Sebring	Muscle Milk Team Cytosport	Greg Pickett / Klaus Graf / Sascha Maassen
2010	Overall	ALMS	Northeast Grand Prix	Muscle Milk Team Cytosport	Greg Pickett / Klaus Graf
2010	Overall	ALMS	**Grand Prix of Mosport**	Muscle Milk Team Cytosport	Romain Dumas / Klaus Graf

* Bold indicates pole position
* Italic indicates the fastest lap

== Gallery ==
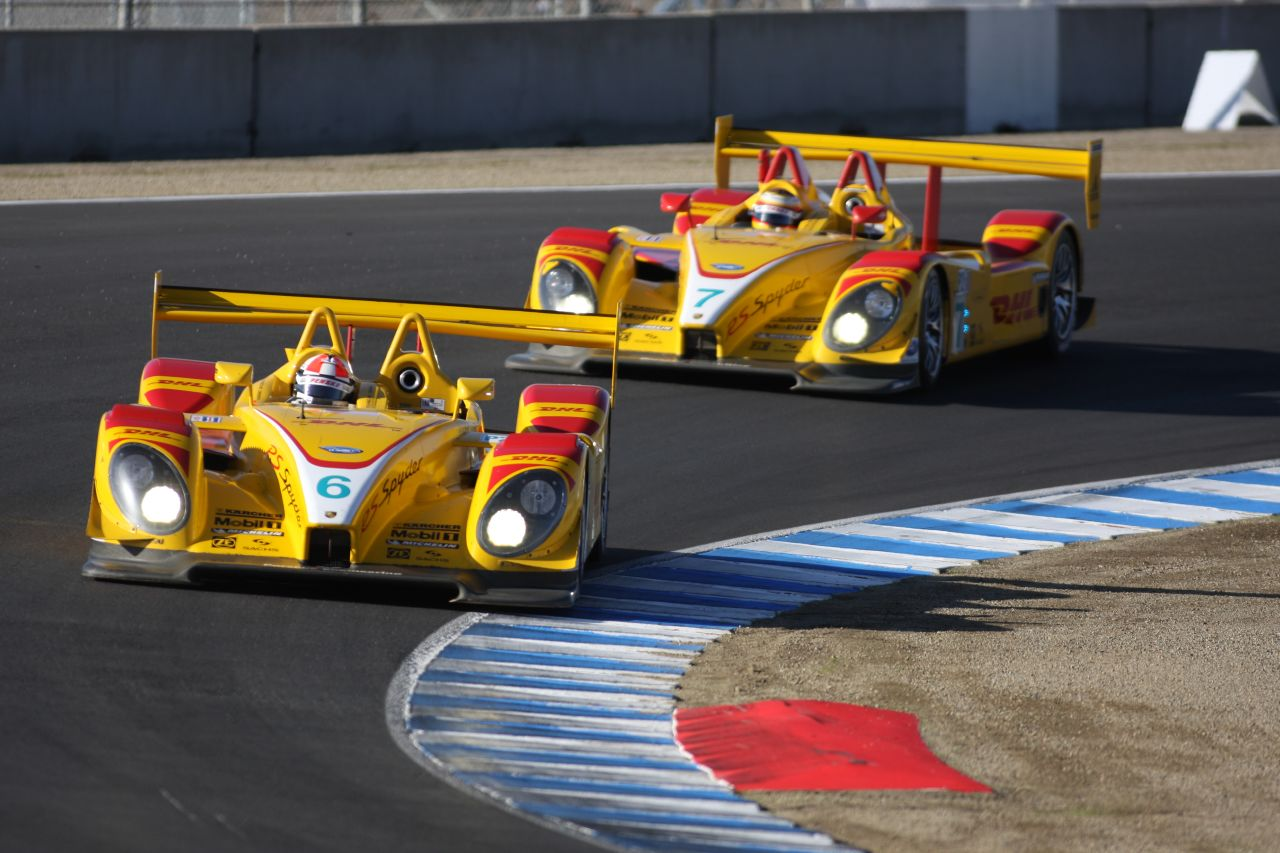
Both of Penske Racing's Porsche RS Spyders at the 2007 Monterey Sports Car Championships.

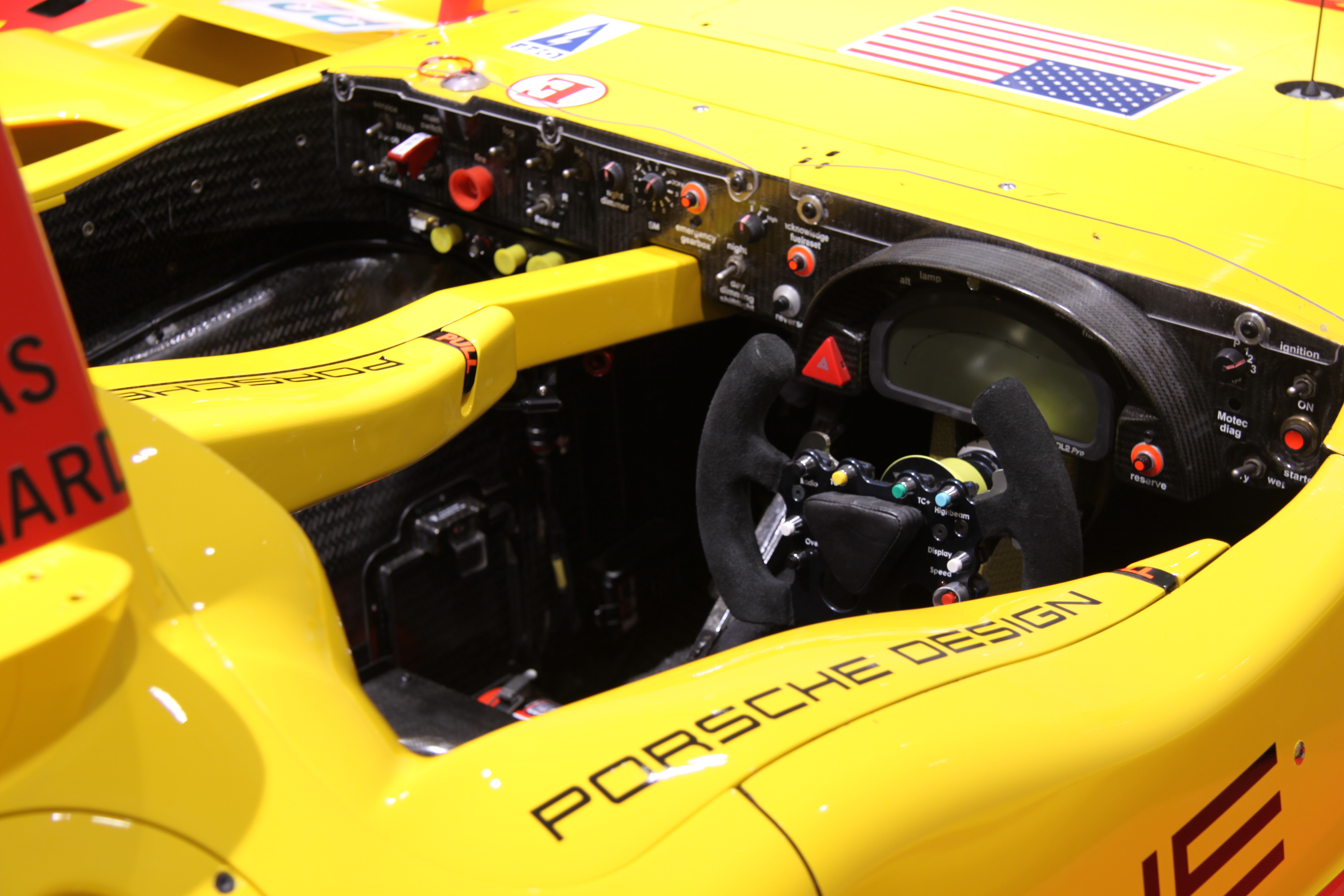
Cockpit of Porsche RS Spyder.

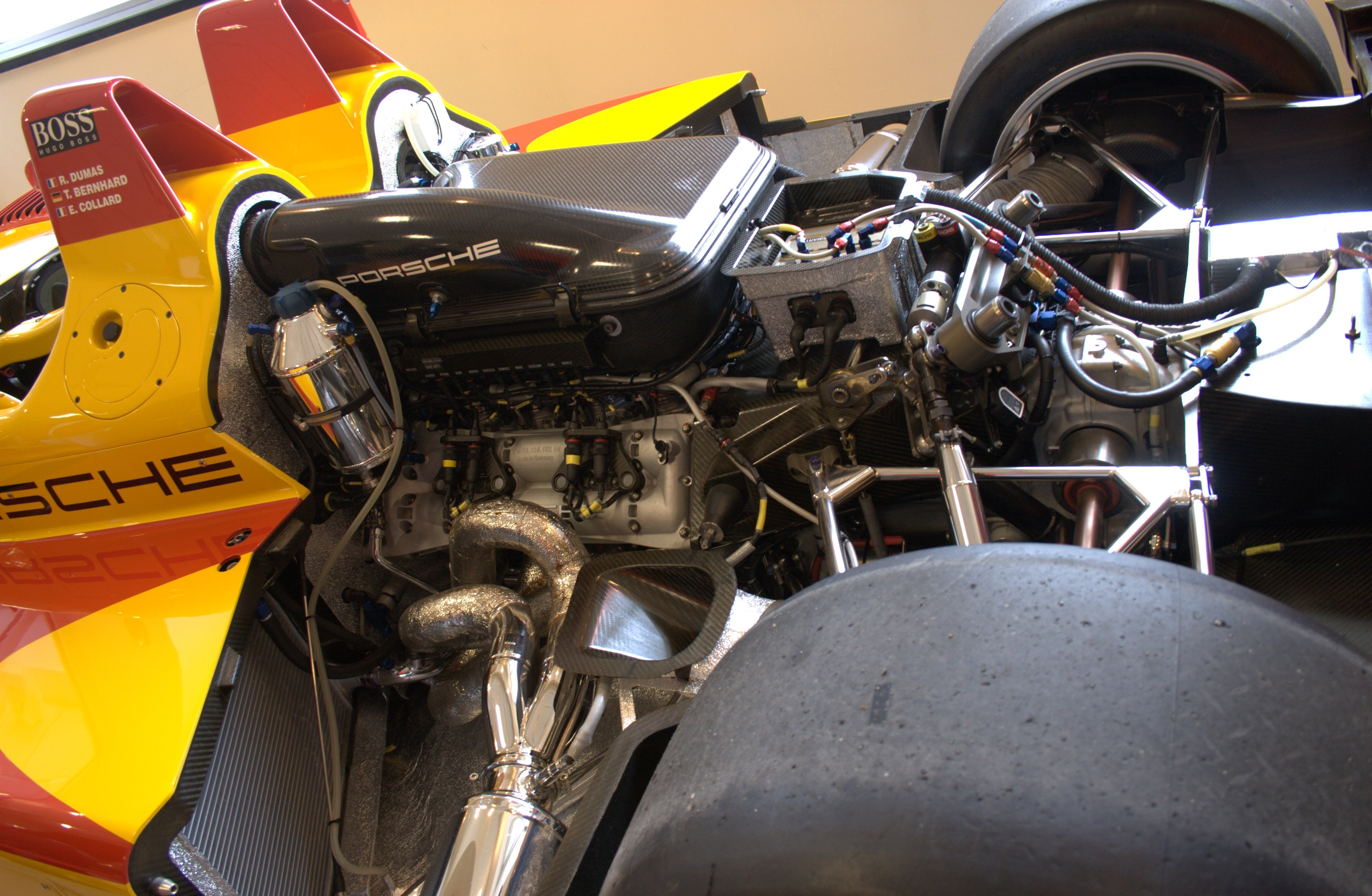
Porsche MR6 3.4 Litre V8 engine, GR6 gearbox and the rear axle with drive shafts and wishbones.

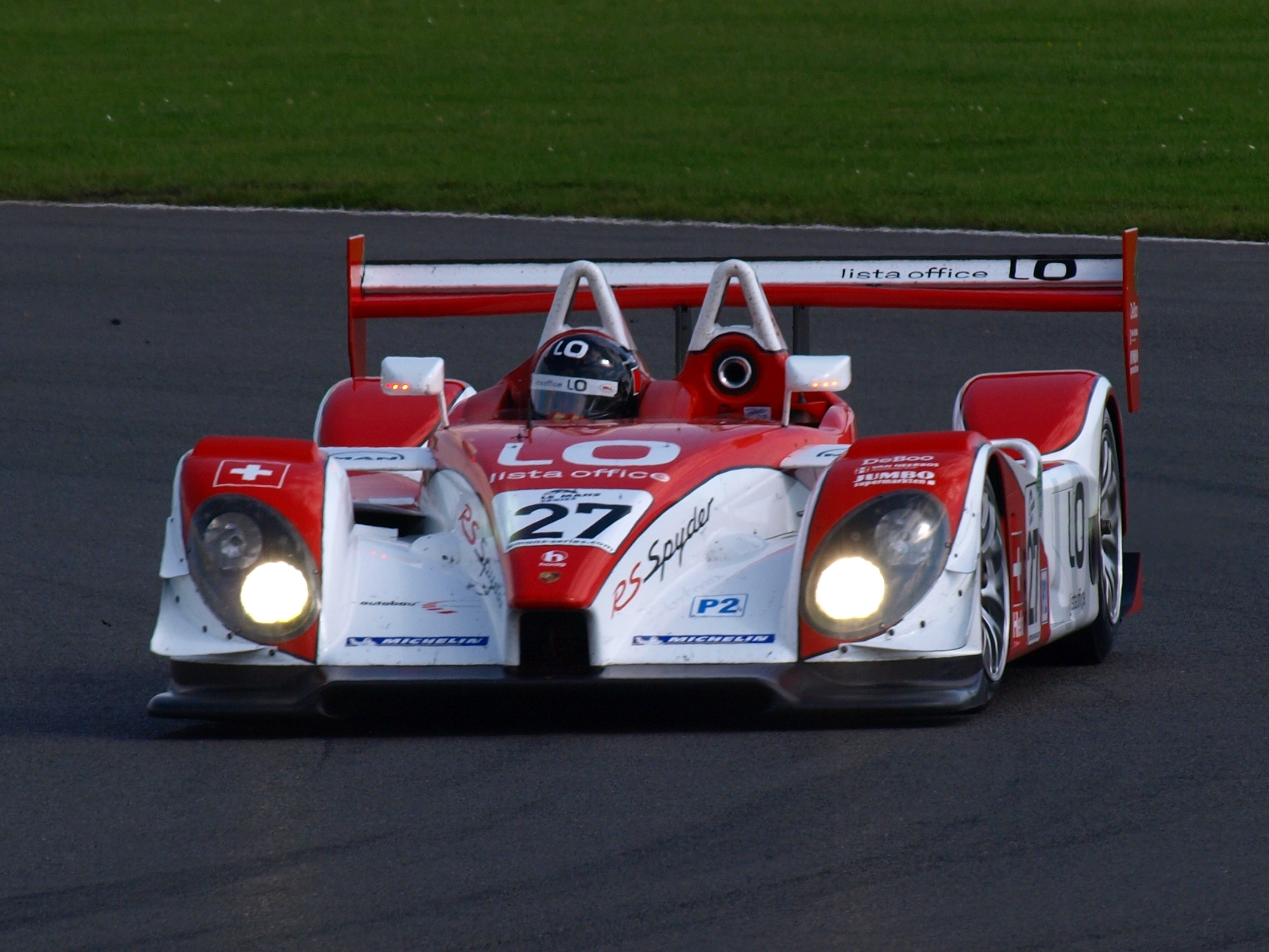
Didier Theys at the wheel of Horag Racing's Porsche RS Spyder at the 2008 1000km of Silverstone.

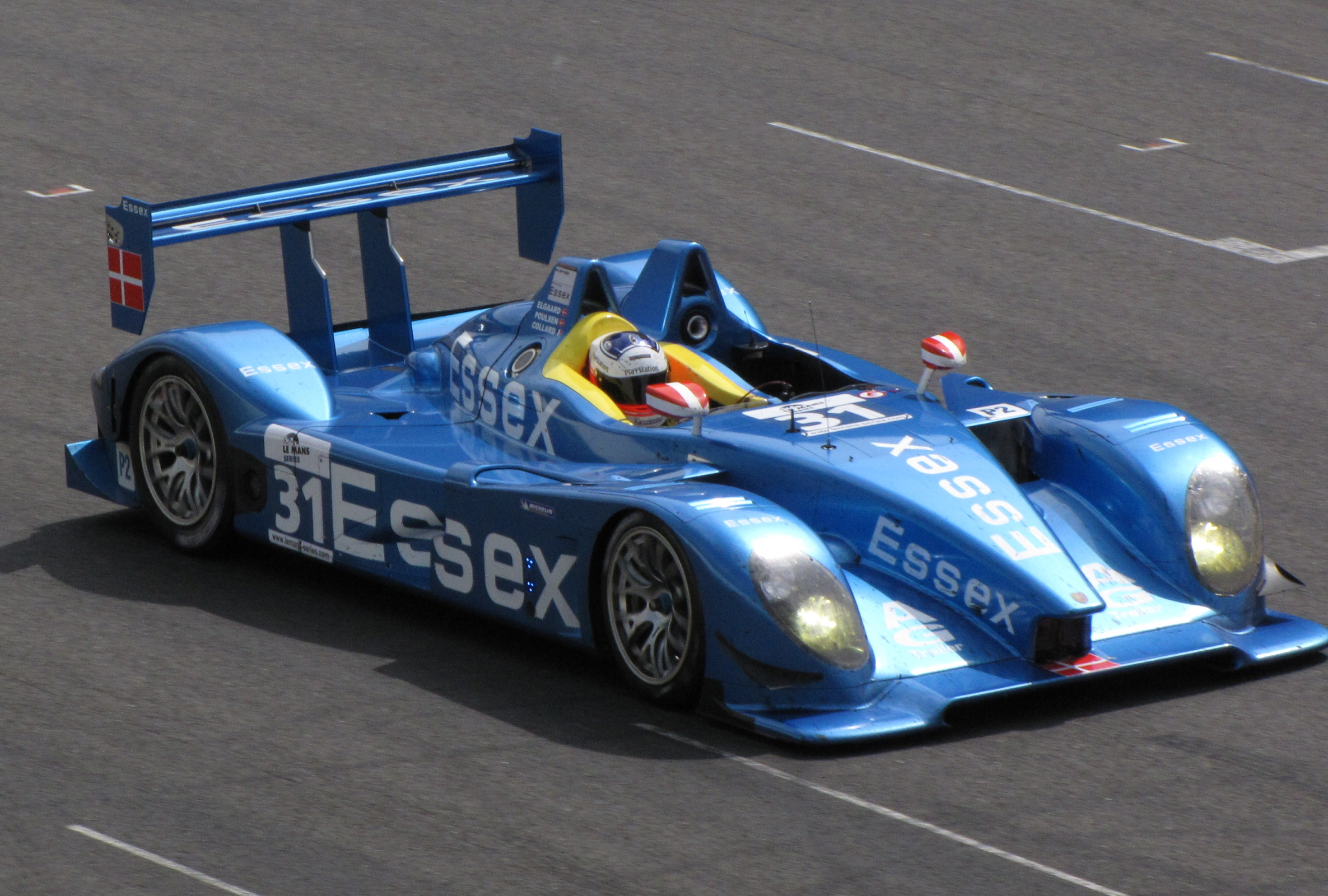
Emmanuel Collard drives a Porsche RS Spyder of Team Essex in Spa 2009.

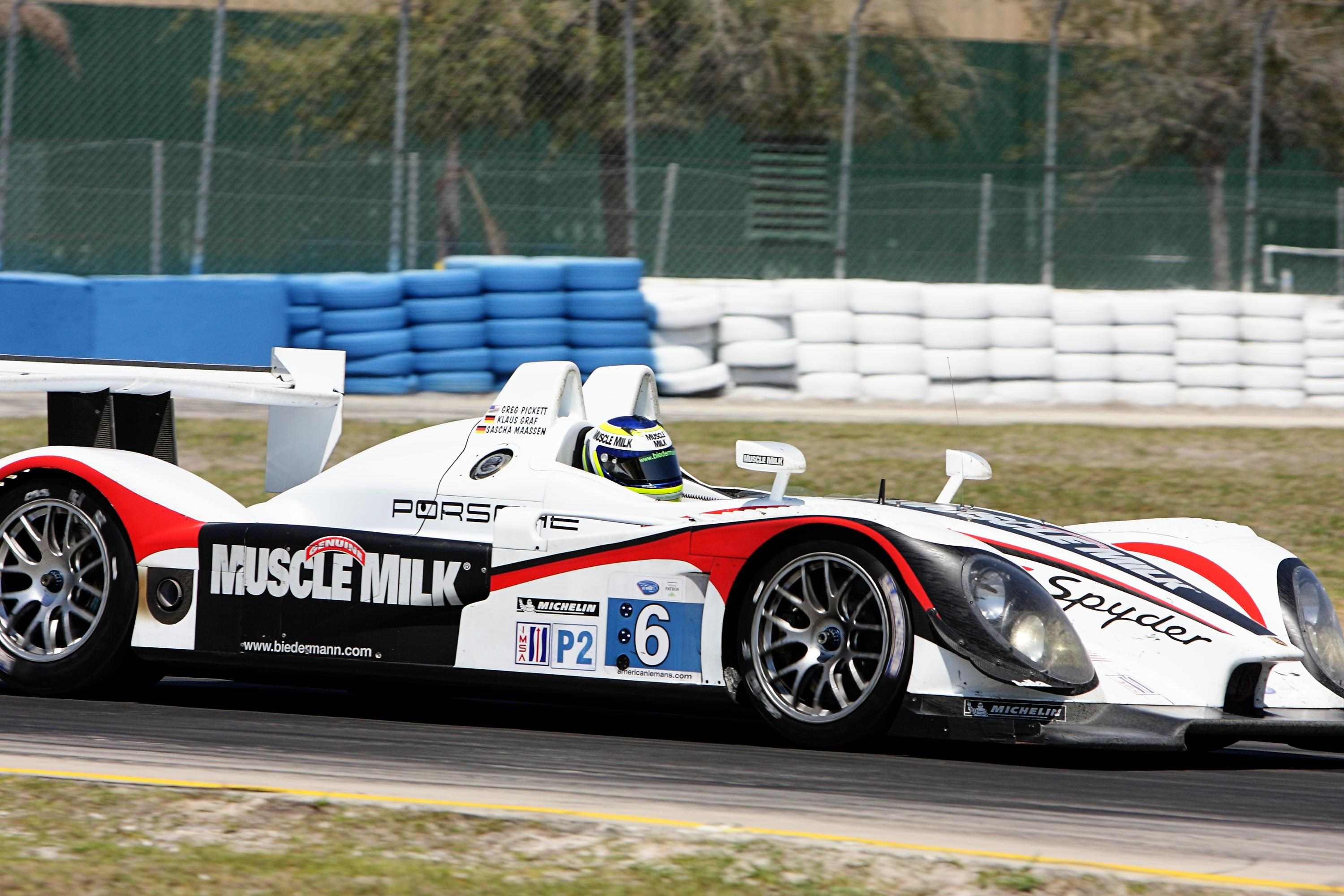
Sebring LMP2 class winner. Muscle Milk Team Cytosport Porsche RS Spyder Evo.

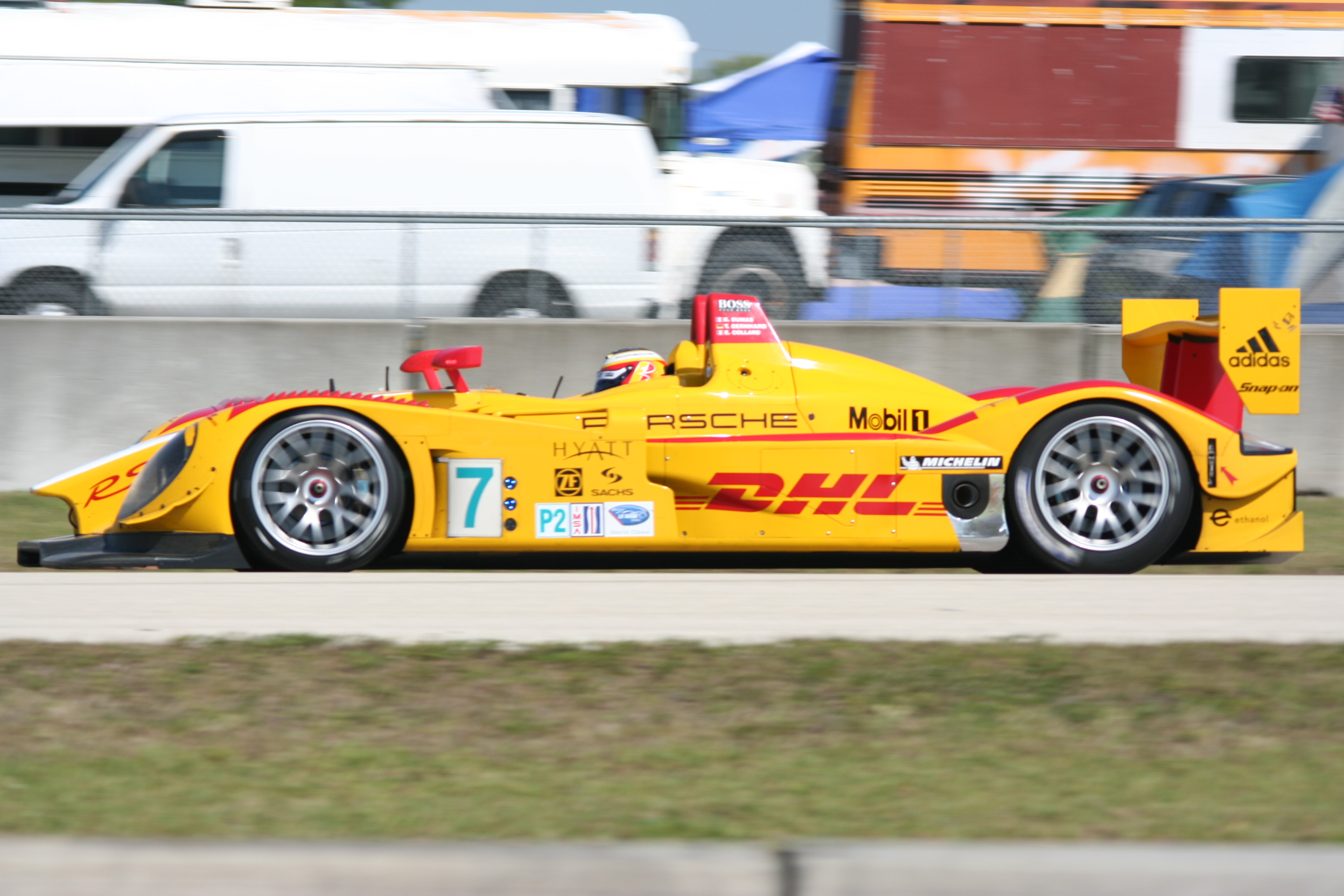
The overall winner of the 2008 12 Hours of Sebring.

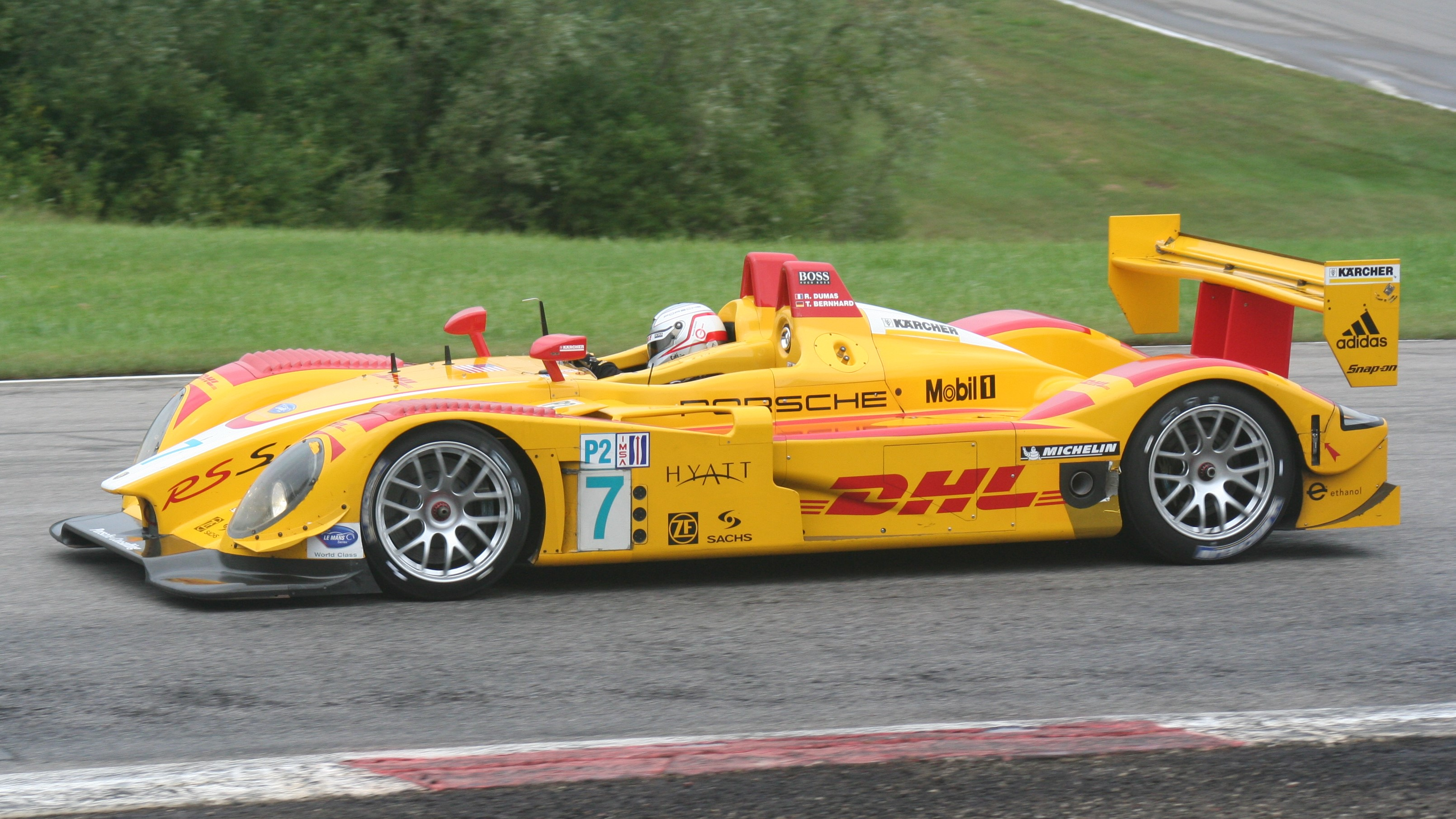
Porsche RS Spyder EVO at the 2007 Grand Prix of Mosport

== See also ==
- Porsche racing models
- Porsche in motorsport
