= 2006 Road America 500 =

7th race of the 2006 American Le Mans Series

Track map of Road America.

The 2006 Generac 500 was the seventh race for the 2006 American Le Mans Series season at Road America. It took place on August 20, 2006.

== Official results ==
Class winners in bold. Cars failing to complete 70% of winner's distance marked as Not Classified (NC).

Pos	Class	No	Team	Drivers	Chassis	Tyre	Laps
Pos	Class	No	Team	Drivers	Engine	Tyre	Laps
1	**LMP1**	**1**	**(United States) Audi Sport North America**	**(Italy) Emanuele Pirro (Germany) Frank Biela**	**Audi R10 TDI**	MI	**76**
1	**LMP1**	**1**	**(United States) Audi Sport North America**	**(Italy) Emanuele Pirro (Germany) Frank Biela**	**Audi TDI 5.5L Turbo V12 (Diesel)**	MI	**76**
2	LMP1	2	(United States) Audi Sport North America	(Italy) Rinaldo Capello (United Kingdom) Allan McNish	Audi R10 TDI	MI	76
2	LMP1	2	(United States) Audi Sport North America	(Italy) Rinaldo Capello (United Kingdom) Allan McNish	Audi TDI 5.5L Turbo V12 (Diesel)	MI	76
3	LMP1	16	(United States) Dyson Racing	(United Kingdom) James Weaver (United States) Butch Leitzinger	Lola B06/10	MI	76
3	LMP1	16	(United States) Dyson Racing	(United Kingdom) James Weaver (United States) Butch Leitzinger	AER P32T 3.6L Turbo V8	MI	76
4	**LMP2**	**6**	**(United States) Penske Racing**	**(Germany) Sascha Maassen (Germany) Timo Bernhard**	**Porsche RS Spyder**	MI	**76**
4	**LMP2**	**6**	**(United States) Penske Racing**	**(Germany) Sascha Maassen (Germany) Timo Bernhard**	**Porsche MR6 3.4L V8**	MI	**76**
5	LMP2	7	(United States) Penske Racing	(France) Romain Dumas (Germany) Lucas Luhr	Porsche RS Spyder	MI	76
5	LMP2	7	(United States) Penske Racing	(France) Romain Dumas (Germany) Lucas Luhr	Porsche MR6 3.4L V8	MI	76
6	LMP1	9	(United States) Highcroft Racing	(United States) Duncan Dayton (United Kingdom) Andy Wallace	MG-Lola EX257	D	76
6	LMP1	9	(United States) Highcroft Racing	(United States) Duncan Dayton (United Kingdom) Andy Wallace	AER P07 2.0L Turbo I4	D	76
7	LMP1	20	(United States) Dyson Racing	(United Kingdom) Guy Smith (United States) Chris Dyson	Lola B06/10	MI	75
7	LMP1	20	(United States) Dyson Racing	(United Kingdom) Guy Smith (United States) Chris Dyson	AER P32T 3.6L Turbo V8	MI	75
8	LMP2	37	(United States) Intersport Racing	(United States) Jon Field (United States) Clint Field (United Kingdom) Liz Halliday	Lola B05/40	G	75
8	LMP2	37	(United States) Intersport Racing	(United States) Jon Field (United States) Clint Field (United Kingdom) Liz Halliday	AER P07 2.0L Turbo I4	G	75
9	**GT1**	**3**	**(United States) Corvette Racing**	**(Canada) Ron Fellows (United States) Johnny O'Connell**	**Chevrolet Corvette C6.R**	MI	**74**
9	**GT1**	**3**	**(United States) Corvette Racing**	**(Canada) Ron Fellows (United States) Johnny O'Connell**	**Chevrolet 7.0L V8**	MI	**74**
10	GT1	4	(United States) Corvette Racing	(United Kingdom) Oliver Gavin (Monaco) Olivier Beretta	Chevrolet Corvette C6.R	MI	73
10	GT1	4	(United States) Corvette Racing	(United Kingdom) Oliver Gavin (Monaco) Olivier Beretta	Chevrolet 7.0L V8	MI	73
11	GT1	007	(United Kingdom) Aston Martin Racing	(United Kingdom) Darren Turner (Czech Republic) Tomáš Enge	Aston Martin DBR9	P	73
11	GT1	007	(United Kingdom) Aston Martin Racing	(United Kingdom) Darren Turner (Czech Republic) Tomáš Enge	Aston Martin 6.0L V12	P	73
12	**GT2**	**31**	**(United States) Petersen Motorsports (United States) White Lightning Racing**	**(United States) Patrick Long (Germany) Jörg Bergmeister**	**Porsche 911 GT3-RSR**	MI	**71**
12	**GT2**	**31**	**(United States) Petersen Motorsports (United States) White Lightning Racing**	**(United States) Patrick Long (Germany) Jörg Bergmeister**	**Porsche 3.6L Flat-6**	MI	**71**
13	GT2	21	(United States) BMW Team PTG	(United States) Bill Auberlen (United States) Joey Hand	BMW M3	Y	71
13	GT2	21	(United States) BMW Team PTG	(United States) Bill Auberlen (United States) Joey Hand	BMW 3.2L I6	Y	71
14	GT2	23	(United States) Alex Job Racing	(Germany) Mike Rockenfeller (Germany) Marcel Tiemann	Porsche 911 GT3-RSR	MI	70
14	GT2	23	(United States) Alex Job Racing	(Germany) Mike Rockenfeller (Germany) Marcel Tiemann	Porsche 3.6L Flat-6	MI	70
15	GT2	61	(United States) Risi Competizione	(Finland) Toni Vilander (Spain) Marc Gené	Ferrari F430GT	MI	70
15	GT2	61	(United States) Risi Competizione	(Finland) Toni Vilander (Spain) Marc Gené	Ferrari 4.0L V8	MI	70
16	GT1	009	(United Kingdom) Aston Martin Racing	(France) Stéphane Sarrazin (Portugal) Pedro Lamy	Aston Martin DBR9	P	69
16	GT1	009	(United Kingdom) Aston Martin Racing	(France) Stéphane Sarrazin (Portugal) Pedro Lamy	Aston Martin 6.0L V12	P	69
17	GT2	45	(United States) Flying Lizard Motorsports	(Germany) Wolf Henzler (United States) Johannes van Overbeek	Porsche 911 GT3-RSR	MI	69
17	GT2	45	(United States) Flying Lizard Motorsports	(Germany) Wolf Henzler (United States) Johannes van Overbeek	Porsche 3.6L Flat-6	MI	69
18	GT2	22	(United States) BMW Team PTG	(United States) Justin Marks (United States) Bryan Sellers	BMW M3	Y	68
18	GT2	22	(United States) BMW Team PTG	(United States) Justin Marks (United States) Bryan Sellers	BMW 3.2L I6	Y	68
19	GT2	62	(United States) Risi Competizione	(France) Stephane Ortelli (Mexico) Mario Domínguez	Ferrari F430GT	MI	65
19	GT2	62	(United States) Risi Competizione	(France) Stephane Ortelli (Mexico) Mario Domínguez	Ferrari 4.0L V8	MI	65
20	LMP1	12	(United States) Autocon Motorsports	(United States) Mike Lewis (United States) Chris McMurry	MG-Lola EX257	D	62
20	LMP1	12	(United States) Autocon Motorsports	(United States) Mike Lewis (United States) Chris McMurry	AER P07 2.0L Turbo I4	D	62
21	GT2	50	(Canada) Multimatic Motorsports Team Panoz	(Australia) David Brabham (Canada) Scott Maxwell	Panoz Esperante GT-LM	P	62
21	GT2	50	(Canada) Multimatic Motorsports Team Panoz	(Australia) David Brabham (Canada) Scott Maxwell	Ford (Elan) 5.0L V8	P	62
22	GT2	51	(Canada) Multimatic Motorsports Team Panoz	(United States) Gunnar Jeannette (United States) Tommy Milner	Panoz Esperante GT-LM	P	62
22	GT2	51	(Canada) Multimatic Motorsports Team Panoz	(United States) Gunnar Jeannette (United States) Tommy Milner	Ford (Elan) 5.0L V8	P	62
23 DNF	GT2	44	(United States) Flying Lizard Motorsports	(United States) Seth Neiman (United States) Lonnie Pechnik	Porsche 911 GT3-RSR	MI	50
23 DNF	GT2	44	(United States) Flying Lizard Motorsports	(United States) Seth Neiman (United States) Lonnie Pechnik	Porsche 3.6L Flat-6	MI	50

== Statistics ==
- Post Position - #2 Audi Sport North America - 1:49.181
- Fastest Lap - #20 Dyson Racing - 1:51.586
- Distance - 307.648 miles (495.111 km)
- Average Speed - 111.51 mph (179.46 km/h)

American Le Mans Series
Previous race: 2006 Portland Grand Prix	2006 season	Next race: 2006 Grand Prix of Mosport
