= 2006 Portland Grand Prix =

6th race of the 2006 American Le Mans Series

Track map of Portland International Raceway

The 2006 Portland Grand Prix was the sixth race for the 2006 American Le Mans Series season at Portland International Raceway. It took place on July 22, 2006.

== Official results ==
Class winners in bold. Cars failing to complete 70% of winner's distance marked as Not Classified (NC).

Pos	Class	No	Team	Drivers	Chassis	Tyre	Laps
Pos	Class	No	Team	Drivers	Engine	Tyre	Laps
1	**LMP1**	**2**	**(United States) Audi Sport North America**	**(Italy) Rinaldo Capello (United Kingdom) Allan McNish**	**Audi R10 TDI**	MI	**142**
1	**LMP1**	**2**	**(United States) Audi Sport North America**	**(Italy) Rinaldo Capello (United Kingdom) Allan McNish**	**Audi TDI 5.5L Turbo V12 (Diesel)**	MI	**142**
2	LMP1	1	(United States) Audi Sport North America	(Germany) Frank Biela (Italy) Emanuele Pirro	Audi R10 TDI	MI	142
2	LMP1	1	(United States) Audi Sport North America	(Germany) Frank Biela (Italy) Emanuele Pirro	Audi TDI 5.5L Turbo V12 (Diesel)	MI	142
3	LMP1	20	(United States) Dyson Racing	(United Kingdom) Guy Smith (United States) Chris Dyson	Lola B06/10	MI	140
3	LMP1	20	(United States) Dyson Racing	(United Kingdom) Guy Smith (United States) Chris Dyson	AER P32T 3.6L Turbo V8	MI	140
4	LMP1	16	(United States) Dyson Racing	(United States) Butch Leitzinger (United Kingdom) James Weaver	Lola B06/10	MI	138
4	LMP1	16	(United States) Dyson Racing	(United States) Butch Leitzinger (United Kingdom) James Weaver	AER P32T 3.6L Turbo V8	MI	138
5	**LMP2**	**37**	**(United States) Intersport Racing**	**(United States) Clint Field (United Kingdom) Liz Halliday**	**Lola B05/40**	G	**135**
5	**LMP2**	**37**	**(United States) Intersport Racing**	**(United States) Clint Field (United Kingdom) Liz Halliday**	**AER P07 2.0L Turbo I4**	G	**135**
6	LMP1	9	(United States) Highcroft Racing	(United Kingdom) Andy Wallace (United States) Duncan Dayton	MG-Lola EX257	D	134
6	LMP1	9	(United States) Highcroft Racing	(United Kingdom) Andy Wallace (United States) Duncan Dayton	AER P07 2.0L Turbo I4	D	134
7	**GT1**	**4**	**(United States) Corvette Racing**	**(United Kingdom) Oliver Gavin (Monaco) Olivier Beretta**	**Chevrolet Corvette C6.R**	MI	**133**
7	**GT1**	**4**	**(United States) Corvette Racing**	**(United Kingdom) Oliver Gavin (Monaco) Olivier Beretta**	**Chevrolet 7.0L V8**	MI	**133**
8	LMP1	12	(United States) Autocon Motorsports	(United States) Chris McMurry (United States) Bryan Willman	MG-Lola EX257	D	133
8	LMP1	12	(United States) Autocon Motorsports	(United States) Chris McMurry (United States) Bryan Willman	AER P07 2.0L Turbo I4	D	133
9	GT1	007	(United Kingdom) Aston Martin Racing	(United Kingdom) Darren Turner (Czech Republic) Tomáš Enge	Aston Martin DBR9	P	133
9	GT1	007	(United Kingdom) Aston Martin Racing	(United Kingdom) Darren Turner (Czech Republic) Tomáš Enge	Aston Martin 6.0L V12	P	133
10	GT1	3	(United States) Corvette Racing	(Canada) Ron Fellows (United States) Johnny O'Connell	Chevrolet Corvette C6.R	MI	133
10	GT1	3	(United States) Corvette Racing	(Canada) Ron Fellows (United States) Johnny O'Connell	Chevrolet 7.0L V8	MI	133
11	GT1	009	(United Kingdom) Aston Martin Racing	(France) Stéphane Sarrazin (Portugal) Pedro Lamy	Aston Martin DBR9	P	131
11	GT1	009	(United Kingdom) Aston Martin Racing	(France) Stéphane Sarrazin (Portugal) Pedro Lamy	Aston Martin 6.0L V12	P	131
12 DNF	LMP2	6	(United States) Penske Racing	(Germany) Sascha Maassen (Germany) Lucas Luhr	Porsche RS Spyder	MI	128
12 DNF	LMP2	6	(United States) Penske Racing	(Germany) Sascha Maassen (Germany) Lucas Luhr	Porsche MR6 3.4L V8	MI	128
13	**GT2**	**62**	**(United States) Risi Competizione**	**(Brazil) Jaime Melo (Finland) Mika Salo**	**Ferrari F430GT**	MI	**128**
13	**GT2**	**62**	**(United States) Risi Competizione**	**(Brazil) Jaime Melo (Finland) Mika Salo**	**Ferrari 4.0L V8**	MI	**128**
14	GT2	31	(United States) Petersen Motorsports (United States) White Lightning Racing	(Germany) Jörg Bergmeister (United States) Patrick Long	Porsche 911 GT3-RSR	MI	128
14	GT2	31	(United States) Petersen Motorsports (United States) White Lightning Racing	(Germany) Jörg Bergmeister (United States) Patrick Long	Porsche 3.6L Flat-6	MI	128
15	GT2	21	(United States) BMW Team PTG	(United States) Bill Auberlen (United States) Joey Hand	BMW M3	Y	128
15	GT2	21	(United States) BMW Team PTG	(United States) Bill Auberlen (United States) Joey Hand	BMW 3.2L I6	Y	128
16	GT2	45	(United States) Flying Lizard Motorsports	(Germany) Wolf Henzler (United States) Johannes van Overbeek	Porsche 911 GT3-RSR	MI	127
16	GT2	45	(United States) Flying Lizard Motorsports	(Germany) Wolf Henzler (United States) Johannes van Overbeek	Porsche 3.6L Flat-6	MI	127
17	GT2	44	(United States) Flying Lizard Motorsports	(United States) Seth Neiman (United States) Darren Law	Porsche 911 GT3-RSR	MI	126
17	GT2	44	(United States) Flying Lizard Motorsports	(United States) Seth Neiman (United States) Darren Law	Porsche 3.6L Flat-6	MI	126
18	GT2	51	(Canada) Multimatic Motorsports Team Panoz	(United States) Tommy Milner (United States) Gunnar Jeannette	Panoz Esperante GT-LM	P	126
18	GT2	51	(Canada) Multimatic Motorsports Team Panoz	(United States) Tommy Milner (United States) Gunnar Jeannette	Ford (Elan) 5.0L V8	P	126
19	GT2	23	(United States) Alex Job Racing	(Germany) Mike Rockenfeller (United Kingdom) Robin Liddell	Porsche 911 GT3-RSR	MI	126
19	GT2	23	(United States) Alex Job Racing	(Germany) Mike Rockenfeller (United Kingdom) Robin Liddell	Porsche 3.6L Flat-6	MI	126
20	GT2	22	(United States) BMW Team PTG	(United States) Justin Marks (United States) Bryan Sellers	BMW M3	Y	126
20	GT2	22	(United States) BMW Team PTG	(United States) Justin Marks (United States) Bryan Sellers	BMW 3.2L I6	Y	126
21	GT2	50	(Canada) Multimatic Motorsports Team Panoz	(Australia) David Brabham (Canada) Scott Maxwell	Panoz Esperante GT-LM	P	125
21	GT2	50	(Canada) Multimatic Motorsports Team Panoz	(Australia) David Brabham (Canada) Scott Maxwell	Ford (Elan) 5.0L V8	P	125
22	LMP2	7	(United States) Penske Racing	(France) Romain Dumas (Germany) Timo Bernhard	Porsche RS Spyder	MI	117
22	LMP2	7	(United States) Penske Racing	(France) Romain Dumas (Germany) Timo Bernhard	Porsche MR6 3.4L V8	MI	117

== Statistics ==
- Pole Position - #16 Dyson Racing - 1:03.101
- Fastest Lap - #2 Audi Sport North America - 1:04.313
- Distance - 278.888 miles (448.827 km)
- Average Speed - 101.323 mph (163.064 km/h)

American Le Mans Series
Previous race: 2006 Utah Grand Prix	2006 season	Next race: 2006 Road America 500
