= 2005 Monterey Sports Car Championships =

Track map of Mazda Raceway Laguna Seca

The 2005 Monterey Sports Car Championships was the final race for the 2005 American Le Mans Series season held at Mazda Raceway Laguna Seca. It took place on October 16, 2005.

This race saw the competition debut of the new Porsche RS Spyder, the first Porsche prototype in approximately seven years.

== Official results ==
Class winners in bold. Cars failing to complete 70% of winner's distance marked as Not Classified (NC).

Pos	Class	No	Team	Drivers	Chassis	Tyre	Laps
Pos	Class	No	Team	Drivers	Engine	Tyre	Laps
1	**LMP1**	**15**	**(United Kingdom) Zytek Engineering**	**(United Kingdom) Tom Chilton (Japan) Hayanari Shimoda**	**Zytek 04S**	M	**164**
1	**LMP1**	**15**	**(United Kingdom) Zytek Engineering**	**(United Kingdom) Tom Chilton (Japan) Hayanari Shimoda**	**Zytek ZG348 3.4L V8**	M	**164**
2	LMP1	2	(United States) ADT Champion Racing	(Germany) Frank Biela (Italy) Emanuele Pirro	Audi R8	M	164
2	LMP1	2	(United States) ADT Champion Racing	(Germany) Frank Biela (Italy) Emanuele Pirro	Audi 3.6L Turbo V8	M	164
3	LMP1	20	(United States) Dyson Racing	(United States) Chris Dyson (United Kingdom) Andy Wallace	MG-Lola EX257	M	163
3	LMP1	20	(United States) Dyson Racing	(United States) Chris Dyson (United Kingdom) Andy Wallace	MG (AER) XP20 2.0L Turbo I4	M	163
4	LMP1	1	(United States) ADT Champion Racing	(Germany) Marco Werner (Finland) JJ Lehto	Audi R8	M	163
4	LMP1	1	(United States) ADT Champion Racing	(Germany) Marco Werner (Finland) JJ Lehto	Audi 3.6L Turbo V8	M	163
5	**LMP2**	**6**	**(United States) Penske Racing**	**(Germany) Lucas Luhr (Germany) Sascha Maassen**	**Porsche RS Spyder**	M	**163**
5	**LMP2**	**6**	**(United States) Penske Racing**	**(Germany) Lucas Luhr (Germany) Sascha Maassen**	**Porsche MR6 3.4L V8**	M	**163**
6	LMP1	16	(United States) Dyson Racing	(United States) Butch Leitzinger (United Kingdom) James Weaver	MG-Lola EX257	M	162
6	LMP1	16	(United States) Dyson Racing	(United States) Butch Leitzinger (United Kingdom) James Weaver	MG (AER) XP20 2.0L Turbo I4	M	162
7	**GT1**	**4**	**(United States) Corvette Racing**	**(United Kingdom) Oliver Gavin (Monaco) Olivier Beretta**	**Chevrolet Corvette C6.R**	M	**158**
7	**GT1**	**4**	**(United States) Corvette Racing**	**(United Kingdom) Oliver Gavin (Monaco) Olivier Beretta**	**Chevrolet 7.0L V8**	M	**158**
8	GT1	3	(United States) Corvette Racing	(Canada) Ron Fellows (United States) Johnny O'Connell	Chevrolet Corvette C6.R	M	157
8	GT1	3	(United States) Corvette Racing	(Canada) Ron Fellows (United States) Johnny O'Connell	Chevrolet 7.0L V8	M	157
9	GT1	58	(United Kingdom) Aston Martin Racing	(Portugal) Pedro Lamy (Netherlands) Peter Kox	Aston Martin DBR9	M	156
9	GT1	58	(United Kingdom) Aston Martin Racing	(Portugal) Pedro Lamy (Netherlands) Peter Kox	Aston Martin 6.0L V12	M	156
10	GT1	57	(United Kingdom) Aston Martin Racing	(Australia) David Brabham (United Kingdom) Darren Turner	Aston Martin DBR9	M	155
10	GT1	57	(United Kingdom) Aston Martin Racing	(Australia) David Brabham (United Kingdom) Darren Turner	Aston Martin 6.0L V12	M	155
11	LMP2	10	(United States) Miracle Motorsports	(United States) Jeff Bucknum (United States) Chris McMurry (United States) James Gue	Courage C65	K	155
11	LMP2	10	(United States) Miracle Motorsports	(United States) Jeff Bucknum (United States) Chris McMurry (United States) James Gue	AER P07 2.0L Turbo I4	K	155
12	LMP2	8	(United States) B-K Motorsports	(United States) Guy Cosmo (United States) Jamie Bach	Courage C65	G	154
12	LMP2	8	(United States) B-K Motorsports	(United States) Guy Cosmo (United States) Jamie Bach	Mazda R20B 2.0L 3-Rotor	G	154
13	LMP1	12	(United States) Autocon Motorsports	(United States) Bryan Willman (United States) Michael Lewis	Riley & Scott Mk III C	D	152
13	LMP1	12	(United States) Autocon Motorsports	(United States) Bryan Willman (United States) Michael Lewis	Elan 6L8 6.0L V8	D	152
14	**GT2**	**31**	**(United States) Petersen Motorsports (United States) White Lightning Racing**	**(United States) Patrick Long (Germany) Jörg Bergmeister**	**Porsche 911 GT3-RSR**	M	**151**
14	**GT2**	**31**	**(United States) Petersen Motorsports (United States) White Lightning Racing**	**(United States) Patrick Long (Germany) Jörg Bergmeister**	**Porsche 3.6L Flat-6**	M	**151**
15	GT2	50	(United States) Panoz Motor Sports	(United States) Bill Auberlen (United Kingdom) Robin Liddell	Panoz Esperante GT-LM	P	151
15	GT2	50	(United States) Panoz Motor Sports	(United States) Bill Auberlen (United Kingdom) Robin Liddell	Ford (Elan) 5.0L V8	P	151
16	GT2	43	(United States) BAM!	(Germany) Mike Rockenfeller (Germany) Wolf Henzler	Porsche 911 GT3-RSR	Y	151
16	GT2	43	(United States) BAM!	(Germany) Mike Rockenfeller (Germany) Wolf Henzler	Porsche 3.6L Flat-6	Y	151
17	GT2	45	(United States) Flying Lizard Motorsports	(United States) Johannes van Overbeek (United States) Jon Fogarty	Porsche 911 GT3-RSR	M	151
17	GT2	45	(United States) Flying Lizard Motorsports	(United States) Johannes van Overbeek (United States) Jon Fogarty	Porsche 3.6L Flat-6	M	151
18	GT2	23	(United States) Alex Job Racing	(Germany) Timo Bernhard (France) Romain Dumas	Porsche 911 GT3-RSR	M	150
18	GT2	23	(United States) Alex Job Racing	(Germany) Timo Bernhard (France) Romain Dumas	Porsche 3.6L Flat-6	M	150
19	GT1	63	(United States) ACEMCO Motorsports	(United States) Terry Borcheller (United Kingdom) Johnny Mowlem	Saleen S7-R	M	148
19	GT1	63	(United States) ACEMCO Motorsports	(United States) Terry Borcheller (United Kingdom) Johnny Mowlem	Ford 7.0L V8	M	148
20	GT2	79	(United States) J3 Racing	(United States) Justin Jackson (United Kingdom) Tim Sugden	Porsche 911 GT3-RSR	P	148
20	GT2	79	(United States) J3 Racing	(United States) Justin Jackson (United Kingdom) Tim Sugden	Porsche 3.6L Flat-6	P	148
21	GT2	51	(United States) Panoz Motor Sports	(United States) Bryan Sellers (United Kingdom) Marino Franchitti	Panoz Esperante GT-LM	P	147
21	GT2	51	(United States) Panoz Motor Sports	(United States) Bryan Sellers (United Kingdom) Marino Franchitti	Ford (Elan) 5.0L V8	P	147
22	GT2	44	(United States) Flying Lizard Motorsports	(United States) Lonnie Pechnik (United States) Seth Neiman	Porsche 911 GT3-RSR	M	147
22	GT2	44	(United States) Flying Lizard Motorsports	(United States) Lonnie Pechnik (United States) Seth Neiman	Porsche 3.6L Flat-6	M	147
23	LMP2	19	(United States) Van der Steur Racing	(United States) Gunnar van der Steur (United Kingdom) Ben Devlin	Lola B2K/40	D	139
23	LMP2	19	(United States) Van der Steur Racing	(United States) Gunnar van der Steur (United Kingdom) Ben Devlin	Nissan (AER) 3.0L V6	D	139
24	GT1	71	(United States) Carsport America	(Italy) Michele Rugolo (United States) Tom Weickardt	Dodge Viper GTS-R	P	137
24	GT1	71	(United States) Carsport America	(Italy) Michele Rugolo (United States) Tom Weickardt	Dodge 8.0L V10	P	137
25	GT2	78	(United States) J3 Racing	(Italy) Marco Petrini (Italy) Maurizio Fabris	Porsche 911 GT3-RS	P	129
25	GT2	78	(United States) J3 Racing	(Italy) Marco Petrini (Italy) Maurizio Fabris	Porsche 3.6L Flat-6	P	129
26	LMP2	37	(United States) Intersport Racing	(United States) Jon Field (United States) Clint Field (United Kingdom) Liz Halliday	Lola B05/40	G	125
26	LMP2	37	(United States) Intersport Racing	(United States) Jon Field (United States) Clint Field (United Kingdom) Liz Halliday	AER P07 2.0L Turbo I4	G	125
27 DNF	GT1	35	(Italy) Maserati Corse (United States) Risi Competizione	(Italy) Andrea Bertolini (Italy) Fabrizio de Simone	Maserati MC12	P	94
27 DNF	GT1	35	(Italy) Maserati Corse (United States) Risi Competizione	(Italy) Andrea Bertolini (Italy) Fabrizio de Simone	Maserati 6.0L V12	P	94
28 DNF	GT2	24	(United States) Alex Job Racing	(United States) Darren Law (United States) Ian Baas	Porsche 911 GT3-RSR	M	33
28 DNF	GT2	24	(United States) Alex Job Racing	(United States) Darren Law (United States) Ian Baas	Porsche 3.6L Flat-6	M	33

== Statistics ==
- Pole Position - #15 Zytek Engineering - 1:14.185
- Fastest Lap - #15 Zytek Engineering - 1:16.480
- Distance - 367.032 miles (590.681 km)
- Average Speed - 91.775 mph (147.698 km/h)

American Le Mans Series
Previous race: 2005 Petit Le Mans	2005 season	Next race: None
