= 2006 Utah Grand Prix =

5th race of the 2006 American Le Mans Series

Track map of Miller Motorsports Park full circuit

The 2006 Utah Grand Prix was the fifth race for the 2006 American Le Mans Series season at Miller Motorsports Park. It took place on July 15, 2006.

== Official results ==
Class winners in bold. Cars failing to complete 70% of winner's distance marked as Not Classified (NC).

Pos	Class	No	Team	Drivers	Chassis	Tyre	Laps
Pos	Class	No	Team	Drivers	Engine	Tyre	Laps
1	**LMP1**	**1**	**(United States) Audi Sport North America**	**(Germany) Frank Biela (Italy) Emanuele Pirro**	**Audi R10 TDI**	MI	**65**
1	**LMP1**	**1**	**(United States) Audi Sport North America**	**(Germany) Frank Biela (Italy) Emanuele Pirro**	**Audi TDI 5.5L Turbo V12 (Diesel)**	MI	**65**
2	**LMP2**	**6**	**(United States) Penske Racing**	**(Germany) Sascha Maassen (Germany) Lucas Luhr**	**Porsche RS Spyder**	MI	**65**
2	**LMP2**	**6**	**(United States) Penske Racing**	**(Germany) Sascha Maassen (Germany) Lucas Luhr**	**Porsche MR6 3.4L V8**	MI	**65**
3	LMP1	16	(United States) Dyson Racing	(United Kingdom) James Weaver (United States) Butch Leitzinger	Lola B06/10	MI	65
3	LMP1	16	(United States) Dyson Racing	(United Kingdom) James Weaver (United States) Butch Leitzinger	AER P32T 3.6L Turbo V8	MI	65
4	LMP1	2	(United States) Audi Sport North America	(Italy) Rinaldo Capello (United Kingdom) Allan McNish	Audi R10 TDI	MI	65
4	LMP1	2	(United States) Audi Sport North America	(Italy) Rinaldo Capello (United Kingdom) Allan McNish	Audi TDI 5.5L Turbo V12 (Diesel)	MI	65
5	LMP1	20	(United States) Dyson Racing	(United States) Chris Dyson (United Kingdom) Guy Smith	Lola B06/10	MI	64
5	LMP1	20	(United States) Dyson Racing	(United States) Chris Dyson (United Kingdom) Guy Smith	AER P32T 3.6L Turbo V8	MI	64
6	LMP1	9	(United States) Highcroft Racing	(United States) Duncan Dayton (United Kingdom) Andy Wallace	MG-Lola EX257	D	62
6	LMP1	9	(United States) Highcroft Racing	(United States) Duncan Dayton (United Kingdom) Andy Wallace	AER P07 2.0L Turbo I4	D	62
7	**GT1**	**007**	**(United Kingdom) Aston Martin Racing**	**(United Kingdom) Darren Turner (Czech Republic) Tomáš Enge**	**Aston Martin DBR9**	P	**62**
7	**GT1**	**007**	**(United Kingdom) Aston Martin Racing**	**(United Kingdom) Darren Turner (Czech Republic) Tomáš Enge**	**Aston Martin 6.0L V12**	P	**62**
8	GT1	009	(United Kingdom) Aston Martin Racing	(France) Stéphane Sarrazin (Italy) Andrea Piccini	Aston Martin DBR9	P	61
8	GT1	009	(United Kingdom) Aston Martin Racing	(France) Stéphane Sarrazin (Italy) Andrea Piccini	Aston Martin 6.0L V12	P	61
9	LMP2	37	(United States) Intersport Racing	(United States) Clint Field (United Kingdom) Liz Halliday	Lola B05/40	G	61
9	LMP2	37	(United States) Intersport Racing	(United States) Clint Field (United Kingdom) Liz Halliday	AER P07 2.0L Turbo I4	G	61
10	GT1	3	(United States) Corvette Racing	(Canada) Ron Fellows (United States) Johnny O'Connell	Chevrolet Corvette C6.R	MI	61
10	GT1	3	(United States) Corvette Racing	(Canada) Ron Fellows (United States) Johnny O'Connell	Chevrolet 7.0L V8	MI	61
11	GT1	4	(United States) Corvette Racing	(United Kingdom) Oliver Gavin (Monaco) Olivier Beretta	Chevrolet Corvette C6.R	MI	61
11	GT1	4	(United States) Corvette Racing	(United Kingdom) Oliver Gavin (Monaco) Olivier Beretta	Chevrolet 7.0L V8	MI	61
12	**GT2**	**62**	**(United States) Risi Competizione**	**(Brazil) Jaime Melo (Finland) Mika Salo**	**Ferrari F430GT**	MI	**59**
12	**GT2**	**62**	**(United States) Risi Competizione**	**(Brazil) Jaime Melo (Finland) Mika Salo**	**Ferrari 4.0L V8**	MI	**59**
13	GT2	31	(United States) Petersen Motorsports (United States) White Lightning Racing	(United States) Patrick Long (Germany) Jörg Bergmeister	Porsche 911 GT3-RSR	MI	59
13	GT2	31	(United States) Petersen Motorsports (United States) White Lightning Racing	(United States) Patrick Long (Germany) Jörg Bergmeister	Porsche 3.6L Flat-6	MI	59
14	GT2	45	(United States) Flying Lizard Motorsports	(United States) Johannes van Overbeek (Germany) Wolf Henzler	Porsche 911 GT3-RSR	MI	59
14	GT2	45	(United States) Flying Lizard Motorsports	(United States) Johannes van Overbeek (Germany) Wolf Henzler	Porsche 3.6L Flat-6	MI	59
15	GT2	23	(United States) Alex Job Racing	(Germany) Mike Rockenfeller (Germany) Klaus Graf	Porsche 911 GT3-RSR	MI	59
15	GT2	23	(United States) Alex Job Racing	(Germany) Mike Rockenfeller (Germany) Klaus Graf	Porsche 3.6L Flat-6	MI	59
16	LMP2	7	(United States) Penske Racing	(France) Romain Dumas (Germany) Timo Bernhard	Porsche RS Spyder	MI	58
16	LMP2	7	(United States) Penske Racing	(France) Romain Dumas (Germany) Timo Bernhard	Porsche MR6 3.4L V8	MI	58
17	GT2	50	(Canada) Multimatic Motorsports Team Panoz	(Canada) Scott Maxwell (Australia) David Brabham	Panoz Esperante GT-LM	P	58
17	GT2	50	(Canada) Multimatic Motorsports Team Panoz	(Canada) Scott Maxwell (Australia) David Brabham	Ford (Elan) 5.0L V8	P	58
18	GT2	21	(United States) BMW Team PTG	(United States) Bill Auberlen (United States) Joey Hand	BMW M3	Y	58
18	GT2	21	(United States) BMW Team PTG	(United States) Bill Auberlen (United States) Joey Hand	BMW 3.2L I6	Y	58
19	GT2	51	(Canada) Multimatic Motorsports Team Panoz	(United States) Gunnar Jeannette (United States) Tommy Milner	Panoz Esperante GT-LM	P	58
19	GT2	51	(Canada) Multimatic Motorsports Team Panoz	(United States) Gunnar Jeannette (United States) Tommy Milner	Ford (Elan) 5.0L V8	P	58
20	GT2	44	(United States) Flying Lizard Motorsports	(United States) Seth Neiman (United States) Darren Law	Porsche 911 GT3-RSR	MI	57
20	GT2	44	(United States) Flying Lizard Motorsports	(United States) Seth Neiman (United States) Darren Law	Porsche 3.6L Flat-6	MI	57
21	GT2	22	(United States) BMW Team PTG	(United States) Justin Marks (United States) Bryan Sellers	BMW M3	Y	56
21	GT2	22	(United States) BMW Team PTG	(United States) Justin Marks (United States) Bryan Sellers	BMW 3.2L I6	Y	56
22 DNF	LMP1	12	(United States) Autocon Motorsports	(United States) Bryan Willman (United States) Mike Lewis	MG-Lola EX257	D	47
22 DNF	LMP1	12	(United States) Autocon Motorsports	(United States) Bryan Willman (United States) Mike Lewis	AER P07 2.0L Turbo I4	D	47

== Statistics ==
- Pole Position - #1 Audi Sport North America - 2:21.554
- Fastest Lap - #6 Penske Racing - 2:23.665
- Distance - 291.59 miles (469.27 km)
- Average Speed - 105.39 mph (169.61 km/h)

American Le Mans Series
Previous race: 2006 New England Grand Prix	2006 season	Next race: 2006 Portland Grand Prix
