= 2006 Grand Prix of Mosport =

8th race of the 2006 American Le Mans Series

Mosport International Raceway

The 2006 Grand Prix of Mosport was the eighth race for the 2006 American Le Mans Series season. It took place on September 3, 2006.

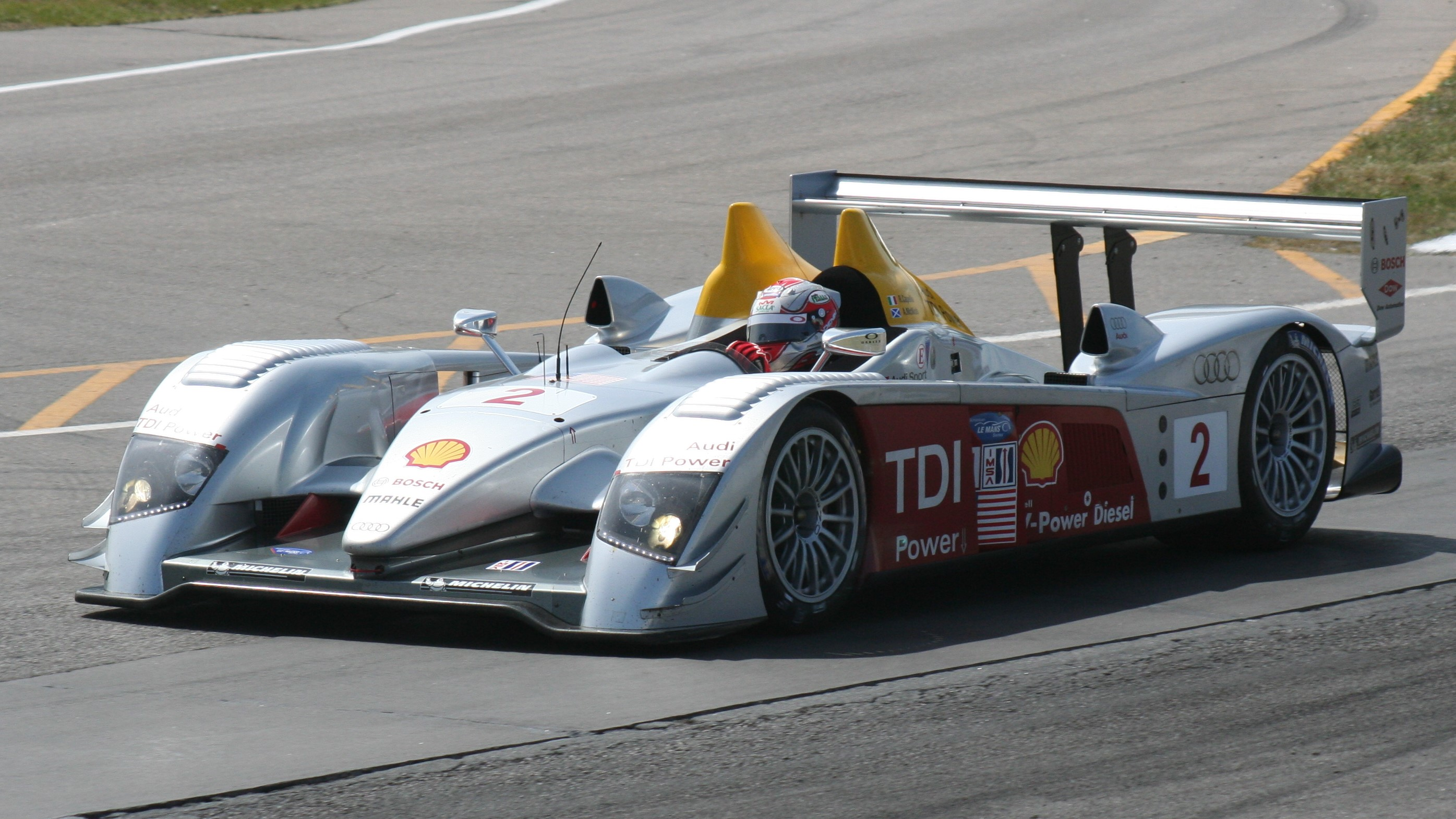
Audi Sport North America Audi R10 TDI - Winner 2006 Grand Prix of Mosport

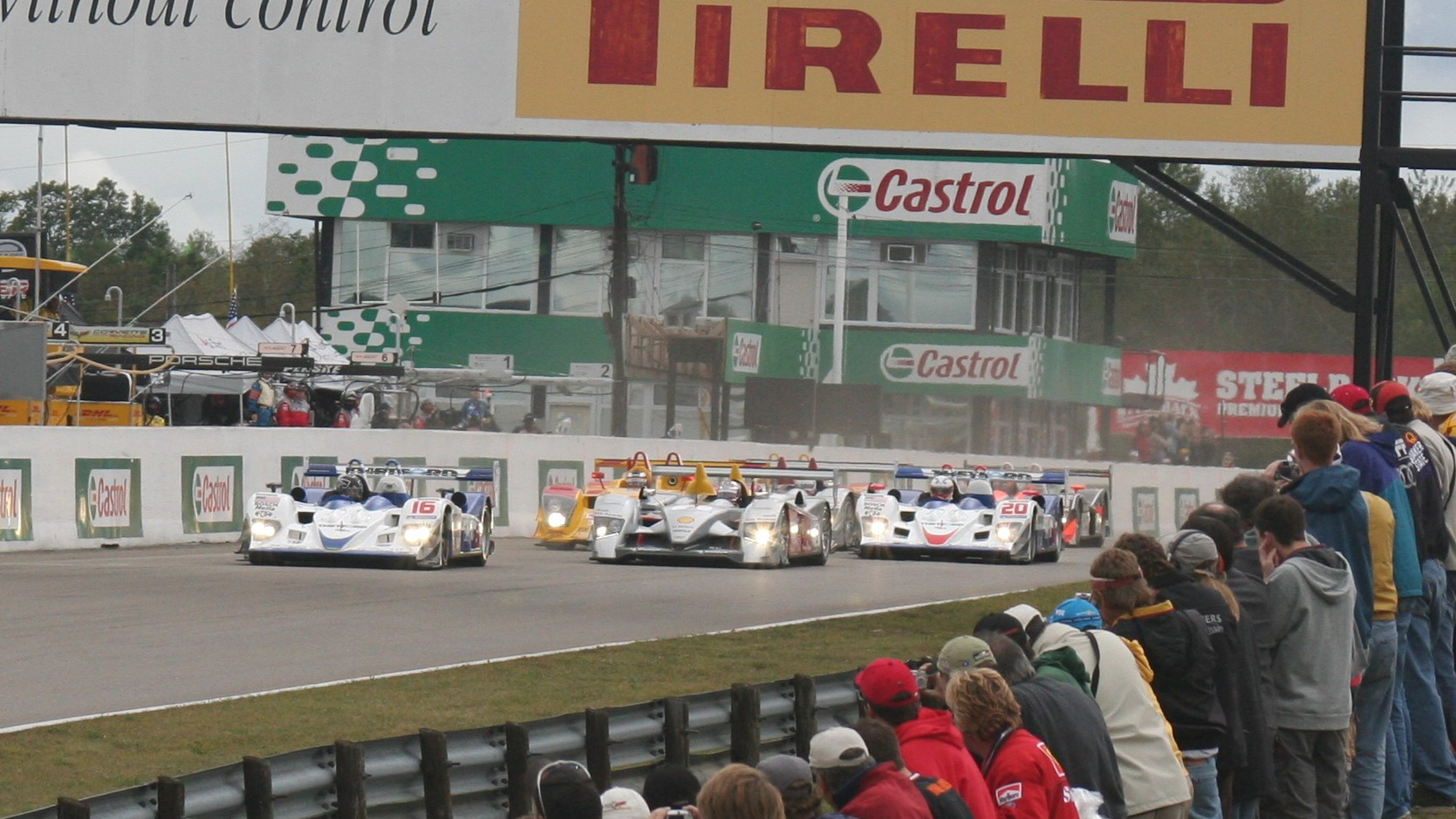
2006 Grand Prix of Mosport race start

== Official results ==
Class winners in bold. Cars failing to complete 70% of winner's distance marked as Not Classified (NC).

Pos	Class	No	Team	Drivers	Chassis	Tyre	Laps
Pos	Class	No	Team	Drivers	Engine	Tyre	Laps
1	**LMP1**	**2**	**(United States) Audi Sport North America**	**(Italy) Rinaldo Capello (United Kingdom) Allan McNish**	**Audi R10 TDI**	MI	**133**
1	**LMP1**	**2**	**(United States) Audi Sport North America**	**(Italy) Rinaldo Capello (United Kingdom) Allan McNish**	**Audi TDI 5.5L Turbo V12 (Diesel)**	MI	**133**
2	LMP1	20	(United States) Dyson Racing	(United Kingdom) Guy Smith (United States) Chris Dyson	Lola B06/10	MI	133
2	LMP1	20	(United States) Dyson Racing	(United Kingdom) Guy Smith (United States) Chris Dyson	AER P32T 3.6L Turbo V8	MI	133
3	LMP1	16	(United States) Dyson Racing	(United States) Butch Leitzinger (United Kingdom) James Weaver (United States) Rob Dyson	Lola B06/10	MI	133
3	LMP1	16	(United States) Dyson Racing	(United States) Butch Leitzinger (United Kingdom) James Weaver (United States) Rob Dyson	AER P32T 3.6L Turbo V8	MI	133
4	LMP1	1	(United States) Audi Sport North America	(Germany) Frank Biela (Italy) Emanuele Pirro	Audi R10 TDI	MI	132
4	LMP1	1	(United States) Audi Sport North America	(Germany) Frank Biela (Italy) Emanuele Pirro	Audi TDI 5.5L Turbo V12 (Diesel)	MI	132
5	**LMP2**	**7**	**(United States) Penske Racing**	**(Germany) Lucas Luhr (France) Romain Dumas**	**Porsche RS Spyder**	MI	**131**
5	**LMP2**	**7**	**(United States) Penske Racing**	**(Germany) Lucas Luhr (France) Romain Dumas**	**Porsche MR6 3.4L V8**	MI	**131**
6	LMP2	6	(United States) Penske Racing	(Germany) Sascha Maassen (Germany) Timo Bernhard	Porsche RS Spyder	MI	131
6	LMP2	6	(United States) Penske Racing	(Germany) Sascha Maassen (Germany) Timo Bernhard	Porsche MR6 3.4L V8	MI	131
7	**GT1**	**009**	**(United Kingdom) Aston Martin Racing**	**(France) Stéphane Sarrazin (Portugal) Pedro Lamy**	**Aston Martin DBR9**	P	**124**
7	**GT1**	**009**	**(United Kingdom) Aston Martin Racing**	**(France) Stéphane Sarrazin (Portugal) Pedro Lamy**	**Aston Martin 6.0L V12**	P	**124**
8	GT1	4	(United States) Corvette Racing	(United Kingdom) Oliver Gavin (Monaco) Olivier Beretta	Chevrolet Corvette C6.R	MI	123
8	GT1	4	(United States) Corvette Racing	(United Kingdom) Oliver Gavin (Monaco) Olivier Beretta	Chevrolet 7.0L V8	MI	123
9	GT1	007	(United Kingdom) Aston Martin Racing	(Netherlands) Peter Kox (Czech Republic) Tomáš Enge	Aston Martin DBR9	P	123
9	GT1	007	(United Kingdom) Aston Martin Racing	(Netherlands) Peter Kox (Czech Republic) Tomáš Enge	Aston Martin 6.0L V12	P	123
10	GT1	3	(United States) Corvette Racing	(Canada) Ron Fellows (United States) Johnny O'Connell	Chevrolet Corvette C6.R	MI	122
10	GT1	3	(United States) Corvette Racing	(Canada) Ron Fellows (United States) Johnny O'Connell	Chevrolet 7.0L V8	MI	122
11	**GT2**	**62**	**(United States) Risi Competizione**	**(Monaco) Stephane Ortelli (United Kingdom) Johnny Mowlem**	**Ferrari F430GT**	MI	**116**
11	**GT2**	**62**	**(United States) Risi Competizione**	**(Monaco) Stephane Ortelli (United Kingdom) Johnny Mowlem**	**Ferrari 4.0L V8**	MI	**116**
12	GT2	61	(United States) Risi Competizione	(Finland) Toni Vilander (Italy) Maurizio Mediani	Ferrari F430GT	MI	116
12	GT2	61	(United States) Risi Competizione	(Finland) Toni Vilander (Italy) Maurizio Mediani	Ferrari 4.0L V8	MI	116
13	GT2	45	(United States) Flying Lizard Motorsports	(United States) Johannes van Overbeek (Germany) Marc Lieb	Porsche 911 GT3-RSR	MI	116
13	GT2	45	(United States) Flying Lizard Motorsports	(United States) Johannes van Overbeek (Germany) Marc Lieb	Porsche 3.6L Flat-6	MI	116
14	GT2	51	(Canada) Multimatic Motorsports Team Panoz	(United States) Gunnar Jeannette (United States) Tommy Milner	Panoz Esperante GT-LM	P	115
14	GT2	51	(Canada) Multimatic Motorsports Team Panoz	(United States) Gunnar Jeannette (United States) Tommy Milner	Ford (Elan) 5.0L V8	P	115
15	GT2	21	(United States) BMW Team PTG	(United States) Bill Auberlen (United States) Joey Hand	BMW M3	Y	115
15	GT2	21	(United States) BMW Team PTG	(United States) Bill Auberlen (United States) Joey Hand	BMW 3.2L I6	Y	115
16	GT2	31	(United States) Petersen Motorsports (United States) White Lightning Racing	(Germany) Jörg Bergmeister (Germany) Tim Bergmeister (United States) Patrick Long	Porsche 911 GT3-RSR	MI	113
16	GT2	31	(United States) Petersen Motorsports (United States) White Lightning Racing	(Germany) Jörg Bergmeister (Germany) Tim Bergmeister (United States) Patrick Long	Porsche 3.6L Flat-6	MI	113
17	GT2	44	(United States) Flying Lizard Motorsports	(United States) Lonnie Pechnik (United States) Seth Neiman	Porsche 911 GT3-RSR	MI	122
17	GT2	44	(United States) Flying Lizard Motorsports	(United States) Lonnie Pechnik (United States) Seth Neiman	Porsche 3.6L Flat-6	MI	122
18	GT2	23	(United States) Alex Job Racing	(Germany) Mike Rockenfeller (Germany) Marcel Tiemann	Porsche 911 GT3-RSR	MI	112
18	GT2	23	(United States) Alex Job Racing	(Germany) Mike Rockenfeller (Germany) Marcel Tiemann	Porsche 3.6L Flat-6	MI	112
19	LMP2	37	(United States) Intersport Racing	(United States) John Field (United States) Clint Field (United Kingdom) Liz Halliday	Lola B05/40	G	101
19	LMP2	37	(United States) Intersport Racing	(United States) John Field (United States) Clint Field (United Kingdom) Liz Halliday	AER P07 2.0L Turbo I4	G	101
20 DNF	LMP1	12	(United States) Autocon Motorsports	(United States) Mike Lewis (United States) Chris McMurry (Canada) John Graham	MG-Lola EX257	D	9
20 DNF	LMP1	12	(United States) Autocon Motorsports	(United States) Mike Lewis (United States) Chris McMurry (Canada) John Graham	AER P07 2.0L Turbo I4	D	9
21 DNF	GT2	22	(United States) BMW Team PTG	(United States) Justin Marks (United States) Bryan Sellers	BMW M3	Y	8
21 DNF	GT2	22	(United States) BMW Team PTG	(United States) Justin Marks (United States) Bryan Sellers	BMW 3.2L I6	Y	8
22 DNF	GT2	50	(Canada) Multimatic Motorsports Team Panoz	(Canada) Scott Maxwell (Australia) David Brabham	Panoz Esperante GT-LM	P	7
22 DNF	GT2	50	(Canada) Multimatic Motorsports Team Panoz	(Canada) Scott Maxwell (Australia) David Brabham	Ford (Elan) 5.0L V8	P	7
FINAL RACE RESULTS

== Statistics ==
- Pole Position - #16 Dyson Racing - Qualifying rained out, grid set according to practice times
- Fastest Lap - #20 Dyson Racing - 1:07.446
- Distance - 327.047 miles (526.331 km)
- Average Speed - 118.924 mph (191.390 km/h)

American Le Mans Series
Previous race: 2006 Road America 500	2006 season	Next race: 2006 Petit Le Mans
