= 2006 Lone Star Grand Prix =

2nd race of the 2006 American Le Mans Series

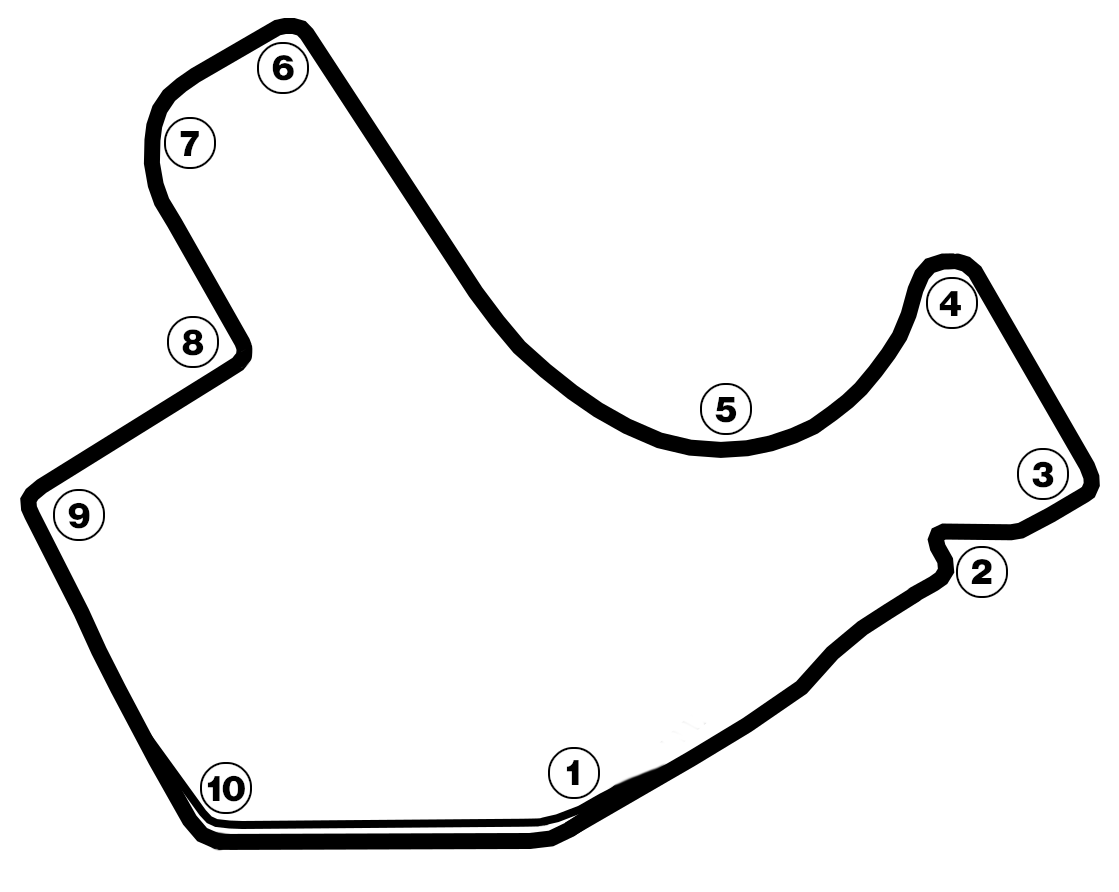
Track map of Reliant Park

The 2006 Lone Star Grand Prix was the second race for the 2006 American Le Mans Series season at a temporary street course built around Reliant Park, Houston. It took place on May 12, 2006.

== Official results ==
Class winners in bold. Cars failing to complete 70% of winner's distance marked as Not Classified (NC).

Pos	Class	No	Team	Drivers	Chassis	Tyre	Laps
Pos	Class	No	Team	Drivers	Engine	Tyre	Laps
1	**LMP1**	**2**	**(United States) Audi Sport North America**	**(Italy) Rinaldo Capello (United Kingdom) Allan McNish**	**Audi R8**	MI	**143**
1	**LMP1**	**2**	**(United States) Audi Sport North America**	**(Italy) Rinaldo Capello (United Kingdom) Allan McNish**	**Audi 3.6L Turbo V8**	MI	**143**
2	**GT1**	**4**	**(United States) Corvette Racing**	**(United Kingdom) Oliver Gavin (Monaco) Olivier Beretta**	**Chevrolet Corvette C6.R**	MI	**138**
2	**GT1**	**4**	**(United States) Corvette Racing**	**(United Kingdom) Oliver Gavin (Monaco) Olivier Beretta**	**Chevrolet 7.0L V8**	MI	**138**
3	GT1	3	(United States) Corvette Racing	(Canada) Ron Fellows (United States) Johnny O'Connell	Chevrolet Corvette C6.R	MI	138
3	GT1	3	(United States) Corvette Racing	(Canada) Ron Fellows (United States) Johnny O'Connell	Chevrolet 7.0L V8	MI	138
4	GT1	007	(United Kingdom) Aston Martin Racing	(United Kingdom) Darren Turner (Czech Republic) Tomáš Enge	Aston Martin DBR9	P	137
4	GT1	007	(United Kingdom) Aston Martin Racing	(United Kingdom) Darren Turner (Czech Republic) Tomáš Enge	Aston Martin 6.0L V12	P	137
5	GT1	009	(United Kingdom) Aston Martin Racing	(Portugal) Pedro Lamy (France) Stéphane Sarrazin	Aston Martin DBR9	P	137
5	GT1	009	(United Kingdom) Aston Martin Racing	(Portugal) Pedro Lamy (France) Stéphane Sarrazin	Aston Martin 6.0L V12	P	137
6	LMP1	16	(United States) Dyson Racing	(United Kingdom) James Weaver (United States) Butch Leitzinger	Lola B06/10	MI	134
6	LMP1	16	(United States) Dyson Racing	(United Kingdom) James Weaver (United States) Butch Leitzinger	AER P32T 3.6L Turbo V8	MI	134
7	**GT2**	**23**	**(United States) Alex Job Racing**	**(Germany) Mike Rockenfeller (Germany) Klaus Graf**	**Porsche 911 GT3-RSR**	MI	**134**
7	**GT2**	**23**	**(United States) Alex Job Racing**	**(Germany) Mike Rockenfeller (Germany) Klaus Graf**	**Porsche 3.6L Flat-6**	MI	**134**
8	GT2	45	(United States) Flying Lizard Motorsports	(United States) Johannes van Overbeek (Germany) Wolf Henzler	Porsche 911 GT3-RSR	MI	133
8	GT2	45	(United States) Flying Lizard Motorsports	(United States) Johannes van Overbeek (Germany) Wolf Henzler	Porsche 3.6L Flat-6	MI	133
9	GT2	62	(United States) Risi Competizione	(Brazil) Jaime Melo (Finland) Mika Salo	Ferrari F430GT	MI	132
9	GT2	62	(United States) Risi Competizione	(Brazil) Jaime Melo (Finland) Mika Salo	Ferrari 4.0L V8	MI	132
10	GT2	31	(United States) Petersen Motorsports (United States) White Lightning Racing	(Germany) Jörg Bergmeister (United States) Patrick Long	Porsche 911 GT3-RSR	MI	131
10	GT2	31	(United States) Petersen Motorsports (United States) White Lightning Racing	(Germany) Jörg Bergmeister (United States) Patrick Long	Porsche 3.6L Flat-6	MI	131
11	**LMP2**	**37**	**(United States) Intersport Racing**	**(United States) Clint Field (United Kingdom) Liz Halliday**	**Lola B05/40**	G	**129**
11	**LMP2**	**37**	**(United States) Intersport Racing**	**(United States) Clint Field (United Kingdom) Liz Halliday**	**AER P07 2.0L Turbo I4**	G	**129**
12	LMP2	8	(United States) B-K Motorsports	(United States) Guy Cosmo (United States) James Bach	Courage C65	G	127
12	LMP2	8	(United States) B-K Motorsports	(United States) Guy Cosmo (United States) James Bach	Mazda R20B 2.0L 3-rotor	G	127
13	LMP1	20	(United States) Dyson Racing	(United States) Chris Dyson (United Kingdom) Guy Smith	Lola B06/10	MI	127
13	LMP1	20	(United States) Dyson Racing	(United States) Chris Dyson (United Kingdom) Guy Smith	AER P32T 3.6L Turbo V8	MI	127
14 DNF	LMP2	6	(United States) Penske Racing	(Germany) Lucas Luhr (Germany) Sascha Maassen	Porsche RS Spyder	MI	123
14 DNF	LMP2	6	(United States) Penske Racing	(Germany) Lucas Luhr (Germany) Sascha Maassen	Porsche MR6 3.4L V8	MI	123
15	GT2	44	(United States) Flying Lizard Motorsports	(United States) Lonnie Pechnik (United States) Seth Neiman	Porsche 911 GT3-RSR	MI	123
15	GT2	44	(United States) Flying Lizard Motorsports	(United States) Lonnie Pechnik (United States) Seth Neiman	Porsche 3.6L Flat-6	MI	123
16	LMP2	19	(United States) Van der Steur Racing	(United Kingdom) Ben Devlin (United States) Gunnar van der Steur	Lola B2K/40	D	122
16	LMP2	19	(United States) Van der Steur Racing	(United Kingdom) Ben Devlin (United States) Gunnar van der Steur	AER (Nissan) 3.0L V6	D	122
17 DNF	LMP2	7	(United States) Penske Racing	(Germany) Timo Bernhard (France) Romain Dumas	Porsche RS Spyder	MI	119
17 DNF	LMP2	7	(United States) Penske Racing	(Germany) Timo Bernhard (France) Romain Dumas	Porsche MR6 3.4L V8	MI	119
18	GT2	50	(Canada) Multimatic Motorsports Team Panoz	(Canada) Scott Maxwell (Australia) David Brabham	Panoz Esperante GT-LM	P	115
18	GT2	50	(Canada) Multimatic Motorsports Team Panoz	(Canada) Scott Maxwell (Australia) David Brabham	Ford (Elan) 5.0L V8	P	115
19 DNF	GT2	21	(United States) BMW Team PTG	(United States) Bill Auberlen (United States) Joey Hand	BMW M3	Y	50
19 DNF	GT2	21	(United States) BMW Team PTG	(United States) Bill Auberlen (United States) Joey Hand	BMW 3.2L I6	Y	50
20 DNF	GT2	22	(United States) BMW Team PTG	(United States) Justin Marks (United States) Martin Jensen	BMW M3	Y	26
20 DNF	GT2	22	(United States) BMW Team PTG	(United States) Justin Marks (United States) Martin Jensen	BMW 3.2L I6	Y	26
21 DNF	GT1	26	(Germany) Konrad Motorsports	(Italy) Paolo Ruberti (Germany) Franz Konrad (United States) Tom Weickardt	Saleen S7-R	P	16
21 DNF	GT1	26	(Germany) Konrad Motorsports	(Italy) Paolo Ruberti (Germany) Franz Konrad (United States) Tom Weickardt	Ford 7.0L V8	P	16
22 DNF	LMP1	12	(United States) Autocon Motorsports	(United States) Chris McMurry (United States) Bryan Willman	MG-Lola EX257	D	15
22 DNF	LMP1	12	(United States) Autocon Motorsports	(United States) Chris McMurry (United States) Bryan Willman	AER P07 2.0L I4	D	15
23 DNF	GT2	51	(Canada) Multimatic Motorsports Team Panoz	(United States) Tommy Milner (United States) Gunnar Jeannette	Panoz Esperante GT-LM	P	6
23 DNF	GT2	51	(Canada) Multimatic Motorsports Team Panoz	(United States) Tommy Milner (United States) Gunnar Jeannette	Ford (Elan) 5.0L V8	P	6

== Statistics ==
- Pole Position - #16 Dyson Racing - 1:04.459
- Fastest Lap - #2 Audi Sport North America - 1:05.148
- Distance - 241.67 miles (388.93 km)
- Average Speed - 87.73 mph (141.19 km/h)

American Le Mans Series
Previous race: 2006 12 Hours of Sebring	2006 season	Next race: 2006 American Le Mans at Mid-Ohio
