= 2006 New England Grand Prix =

4th race of the 2006 American Le Mans Series

Track map of Lime Rock Park

The 2006 New England Grand Prix was the fourth race for the 2006 American Le Mans Series season at Lime Rock Park. It took place on July 1, 2006.

This race was marked by the final running of the Audi R8 in competitive motorsports. The car carried a special paintjob dedicated to its multiple ALMS championships, multiple 24 Hours of Le Mans wins, and the names of every driver to run an Audi R8, as well as every track that the Audi R8 won at. The R8 was replaced by the new Audi R10 TDI for the next race in Utah.

== Official results ==
Class winners in bold. Cars failing to complete 70% of winner's distance marked as Not Classified (NC).

Pos	Class	No	Team	Drivers	Chassis	Tyre	Laps
Pos	Class	No	Team	Drivers	Engine	Tyre	Laps
1	**LMP1**	**2**	**(United States) Audi Sport North America**	**(Italy) Rinaldo Capello (United Kingdom) Allan McNish**	**Audi R8**	M	**177**
1	**LMP1**	**2**	**(United States) Audi Sport North America**	**(Italy) Rinaldo Capello (United Kingdom) Allan McNish**	**Audi 3.6L Turbo V8**	M	**177**
2	**LMP2**	**7**	**(United States) Penske Racing**	**(France) Romain Dumas (Germany) Timo Bernhard**	**Porsche RS Spyder**	M	**177**
2	**LMP2**	**7**	**(United States) Penske Racing**	**(France) Romain Dumas (Germany) Timo Bernhard**	**Porsche MR6 3.4L V8**	M	**177**
3	LMP2	6	(United States) Penske Racing	(Germany) Sascha Maassen (Germany) Lucas Luhr	Porsche RS Spyder	M	174
3	LMP2	6	(United States) Penske Racing	(Germany) Sascha Maassen (Germany) Lucas Luhr	Porsche MR6 3.4L V8	M	174
4	**GT1**	**009**	**(United Kingdom) Aston Martin Racing**	**(France) Stéphane Sarrazin (Portugal) Pedro Lamy**	**Aston Martin DBR9**	P	**166**
4	**GT1**	**009**	**(United Kingdom) Aston Martin Racing**	**(France) Stéphane Sarrazin (Portugal) Pedro Lamy**	**Aston Martin 6.0L V12**	P	**166**
5	GT1	3	(United States) Corvette Racing	(Canada) Ron Fellows (United States) Johnny O'Connell	Chevrolet Corvette C6.R	M	166
5	GT1	3	(United States) Corvette Racing	(Canada) Ron Fellows (United States) Johnny O'Connell	Chevrolet 7.0L V8	M	166
6	GT1	007	(United Kingdom) Aston Martin Racing	(United Kingdom) Darren Turner (Czech Republic) Tomáš Enge	Aston Martin DBR9	P	166
6	GT1	007	(United Kingdom) Aston Martin Racing	(United Kingdom) Darren Turner (Czech Republic) Tomáš Enge	Aston Martin 6.0L V12	P	166
7	**GT2**	**31**	**(United States) Petersen Motorsport (United States) White Lightning Racing**	**(Germany) Jörg Bergmeister (United States) Patrick Long**	**Porsche 911 GT3-RSR**	M	**162**
7	**GT2**	**31**	**(United States) Petersen Motorsport (United States) White Lightning Racing**	**(Germany) Jörg Bergmeister (United States) Patrick Long**	**Porsche 3.6L Flat-6**	M	**162**
8	GT2	45	(United States) Flying Lizard Motorsports	(Germany) Wolf Henzler (United States) Johannes van Overbeek	Porsche 911 GT3	M	161
8	GT2	45	(United States) Flying Lizard Motorsports	(Germany) Wolf Henzler (United States) Johannes van Overbeek	Porsche 3.6L Flat-6	M	161
9	GT2	21	(United States) BMW Team PTG	(United States) Bill Auberlen (United States) Joey Hand	BMW M3	Y	160
9	GT2	21	(United States) BMW Team PTG	(United States) Bill Auberlen (United States) Joey Hand	BMW 3.2L I6	Y	160
10	GT2	22	(United States) BMW Team PTG	(United States) Justin Marks (United States) Bryan Sellers	BMW M3	Y	158
10	GT2	22	(United States) BMW Team PTG	(United States) Justin Marks (United States) Bryan Sellers	BMW 3.2L I6	Y	158
11	GT2	62	(United States) Risi Competizione	(Spain) Marc Gené (Mexico) Mario Domínguez	Ferrari F430GT	M	158
11	GT2	62	(United States) Risi Competizione	(Spain) Marc Gené (Mexico) Mario Domínguez	Ferrari 4.0L V8	M	158
12	GT2	50	(Canada) Multimatic Motorsports Team Panoz	(Australia) David Brabham (Canada) Scott Maxwell	Panoz Esperante GT-LM	P	157
12	GT2	50	(Canada) Multimatic Motorsports Team Panoz	(Australia) David Brabham (Canada) Scott Maxwell	Ford (Elan) 5.0L V8	P	157
13	GT2	51	(Canada) Multimatic Motorsports Team Panoz	(United States) Gunnar Jeannette (United States) Tommy Milner	Panoz Esperante GT-LM	P	156
13	GT2	51	(Canada) Multimatic Motorsports Team Panoz	(United States) Gunnar Jeannette (United States) Tommy Milner	Ford (Elan) 5.0L V8	P	156
14	LMP1	12	(United States) Autocon Motorsports	(United States) Chris McMurry (United States) Mike Lewis	MG-Lola EX257	D	156
14	LMP1	12	(United States) Autocon Motorsports	(United States) Chris McMurry (United States) Mike Lewis	AER P07 2.0L I4	D	156
15	GT1	4	(United States) Corvette Racing	(United Kingdom) Oliver Gavin (Monaco) Olivier Beretta	Chevrolet Corvette C6.R	M	142
15	GT1	4	(United States) Corvette Racing	(United Kingdom) Oliver Gavin (Monaco) Olivier Beretta	Chevrolet 7.0L V8	M	142
16	GT2	44	(United States) Flying Lizard Motorsports	(United States) Lonnie Pechnik (United States) Seth Neiman	Porsche 911 GT3-RSR	M	142
16	GT2	44	(United States) Flying Lizard Motorsports	(United States) Lonnie Pechnik (United States) Seth Neiman	Porsche 3.6L Flat-6	M	142
17 DNF	LMP2	37	(United States) Intersport Racing	(United States) Clint Field (United Kingdom) Liz Halliday	Lola B05/40	G	136
17 DNF	LMP2	37	(United States) Intersport Racing	(United States) Clint Field (United Kingdom) Liz Halliday	AER P07 2.0L Turbo I4	G	136
18	GT2	23	(United States) Alex Job Racing	(Germany) Klaus Graf (Germany) Mike Rockenfeller	Porsche 911 GT3-RSR	M	129
18	GT2	23	(United States) Alex Job Racing	(Germany) Klaus Graf (Germany) Mike Rockenfeller	Porsche 3.6L Flat-6	M	129
19 NC	LMP1	16	(United States) Dyson Racing	(United Kingdom) James Weaver (United States) Butch Leitzinger	Lola B06/10	M	122
19 NC	LMP1	16	(United States) Dyson Racing	(United Kingdom) James Weaver (United States) Butch Leitzinger	AER P32T 3.6L Turbo V8	M	122
20 DNF	LMP1	9	(United States) Highcroft Racing	(United States) Duncan Dayton (United States) Andy Wallace	MG-Lola EX257	D	81
20 DNF	LMP1	9	(United States) Highcroft Racing	(United States) Duncan Dayton (United States) Andy Wallace	AER P07 2.0L Turbo I4	D	81
21 DNF	GT2	61	(United States) Risi Competizione	(Finland) Toni Vilander (Germany) Ralf Kelleners	Ferrari F430GT	M	32
21 DNF	GT2	61	(United States) Risi Competizione	(Finland) Toni Vilander (Germany) Ralf Kelleners	Ferrari 4.0L V8	M	32
22 DNF	LMP2	19	(United States) Van der Steur Racing	(United States) Gunnar van der Steur (United Kingdom) Ben Devlin	Lola B2K/40	D	32
22 DNF	LMP2	19	(United States) Van der Steur Racing	(United States) Gunnar van der Steur (United Kingdom) Ben Devlin	AER (Nissan) 3.0L V6	D	32
23 DNF	LMP1	20	(United States) Dyson Racing	(United States) Chris Dyson (United Kingdom) Guy Smith	Lola B06/10	M	21
23 DNF	LMP1	20	(United States) Dyson Racing	(United States) Chris Dyson (United Kingdom) Guy Smith	AER P32T 3.6L Turbo V8	M	21
24 DNF	LMP2	8	(United States) B-K Motorsport	(United States) Guy Cosmo (United States) James Bach	Courage C65	G	21
24 DNF	LMP2	8	(United States) B-K Motorsport	(United States) Guy Cosmo (United States) James Bach	Mazda R20B 2.0L 3-rotor	G	21

== Statistics ==
- Pole Position - #7 Penske Racing - 0:45.588
- Fastest Lap - #7 Penske Racing - 0:47.074
- Distance - 272.58 miles (438.67 km)
- Average Speed - 98.656 mph (158.771 km/h)

American Le Mans Series
Previous race: 2006 American Le Mans at Mid-Ohio	2006 season	Next race: 2006 Utah Grand Prix
