= 2006 American Le Mans at Mid-Ohio =

3rd race of the 2006 American Le Mans Series

The layout of Mid-Ohio Sports Car Course

The 2006 American Le Mans at Mid-Ohio was the third race for the 2006 American Le Mans Series season at the Mid-Ohio Sports Car Course. It took place on May 21, 2006.

This was the first time since the 2003 Grand Prix of Sonoma that the smaller Le Mans Prototype class was able to win the race overall, with both LMP2 class Penske Porsches finishing ahead of the LMP1 Audi R8.

== Official results ==
Class winners in bold. Cars failing to complete 70% of winner's distance marked as Not Classified (NC).

Pos	Class	No	Team	Drivers	Chassis	Tyre	Laps
Pos	Class	No	Team	Drivers	Engine	Tyre	Laps
1	**LMP2**	**7**	**(United States) Penske Racing**	**(Germany) Timo Bernhard (France) Romain Dumas**	**Porsche RS Spyder**	MI	**119**
1	**LMP2**	**7**	**(United States) Penske Racing**	**(Germany) Timo Bernhard (France) Romain Dumas**	**Porsche MR6 3.4L V8**	MI	**119**
2	LMP2	6	(United States) Penske Racing	(Germany) Sascha Maassen (Germany) Lucas Luhr	Porsche RS Spyder	MI	119
2	LMP2	6	(United States) Penske Racing	(Germany) Sascha Maassen (Germany) Lucas Luhr	Porsche MR6 3.4L V8	MI	119
3	**LMP1**	**2**	**(United States) Audi Sport North America**	**(Italy) Rinaldo Capello (United Kingdom) Allan McNish**	**Audi R8**	MI	**119**
3	**LMP1**	**2**	**(United States) Audi Sport North America**	**(Italy) Rinaldo Capello (United Kingdom) Allan McNish**	**Audi 3.6L Turbo V8**	MI	**119**
4	LMP2	37	(United States) Intersport Racing	(United States) Clint Field (United Kingdom) Liz Halliday	Lola B05/40	G	116
4	LMP2	37	(United States) Intersport Racing	(United States) Clint Field (United Kingdom) Liz Halliday	AER P07 2.0L Turbo I4	G	116
5	LMP1	16	(United States) Dyson Racing	(United States) Butch Leitzinger (United Kingdom) James Weaver	Lola B06/10	MI	116
5	LMP1	16	(United States) Dyson Racing	(United States) Butch Leitzinger (United Kingdom) James Weaver	AER P32T 3.6L Turbo V8	MI	116
6	**GT1**	**4**	**(United States) Corvette Racing**	**(United Kingdom) Oliver Gavin (Monaco) Olivier Beretta**	**Chevrolet Corvette C6.R**	MI	**116**
6	**GT1**	**4**	**(United States) Corvette Racing**	**(United Kingdom) Oliver Gavin (Monaco) Olivier Beretta**	**Chevrolet 7.0L V8**	MI	**116**
7	GT1	3	(United States) Corvette Racing	(Canada) Ron Fellows (United States) Johnny O'Connell	Chevrolet Corvette C6.R	MI	116
7	GT1	3	(United States) Corvette Racing	(Canada) Ron Fellows (United States) Johnny O'Connell	Chevrolet 7.0L V8	MI	116
8	GT1	007	(United Kingdom) Aston Martin Racing	(United Kingdom) Darren Turner (Czech Republic) Tomáš Enge	Aston Martin DBR9	P	115
8	GT1	007	(United Kingdom) Aston Martin Racing	(United Kingdom) Darren Turner (Czech Republic) Tomáš Enge	Aston Martin 6.0L V12	P	115
9	GT1	009	(United Kingdom) Aston Martin Racing	(France) Stéphane Sarrazin (Portugal) Pedro Lamy	Aston Martin DBR9	P	115
9	GT1	009	(United Kingdom) Aston Martin Racing	(France) Stéphane Sarrazin (Portugal) Pedro Lamy	Aston Martin 6.0L V12	P	115
10	LMP2	8	(United States) B-K Motorsports	(United States) Guy Cosmo (United States) James Bach	Courage C65	G	112
10	LMP2	8	(United States) B-K Motorsports	(United States) Guy Cosmo (United States) James Bach	Mazda R20B 2.0L 3-rotor	G	112
11	**GT2**	**45**	**(United States) Flying Lizard Motorsports**	**(Germany) Wolf Henzler (United States) Johannes van Overbeek**	**Porsche 911 GT3-RSR**	MI	**111**
11	**GT2**	**45**	**(United States) Flying Lizard Motorsports**	**(Germany) Wolf Henzler (United States) Johannes van Overbeek**	**Porsche 3.6L Flat-6**	MI	**111**
12	LMP1	12	(United States) Autocon Motorsports	(United States) Chris McMurry (United States) Mike Lewis	MG-Lola EX257	D	111
12	LMP1	12	(United States) Autocon Motorsports	(United States) Chris McMurry (United States) Mike Lewis	AER P07 2.0L Turbo I4	D	111
13	GT2	50	(Canada) Multimatic Motorsports Team Panoz	(Australia) David Brabham (Canada) Scott Maxwell	Panoz Esperante GT-LM	P	110
13	GT2	50	(Canada) Multimatic Motorsports Team Panoz	(Australia) David Brabham (Canada) Scott Maxwell	Ford (Elan) 5.0L V8	P	110
14	GT2	44	(United States) Flying Lizard Motorsports	(United States) Seth Neiman (United States) Darren Law	Porsche 911 GT3-RSR	MI	109
14	GT2	44	(United States) Flying Lizard Motorsports	(United States) Seth Neiman (United States) Darren Law	Porsche 3.6L Flat-6	MI	109
15	GT2	21	(United States) BMW Team PTG	(United States) Bill Auberlen (United States) Joey Hand	BMW M3	Y	109
15	GT2	21	(United States) BMW Team PTG	(United States) Bill Auberlen (United States) Joey Hand	BMW 3.2L I6	Y	109
16	GT2	22	(United States) BMW Team PTG	(United States) Justin Marks (United States) Bryan Sellers	BMW M3	Y	107
16	GT2	22	(United States) BMW Team PTG	(United States) Justin Marks (United States) Bryan Sellers	BMW 3.2L I6	Y	107
17	GT2	62	(United States) Risi Competizione	(Brazil) Jaime Melo (Finland) Mika Salo	Ferrari F430GT	MI	105
17	GT2	62	(United States) Risi Competizione	(Brazil) Jaime Melo (Finland) Mika Salo	Ferrari 4.0L V8	MI	105
18	LMP2	19	(United States) Van der Steur Racing	(United States) Gunnar van der Steur (United Kingdom) Ben Devlin	Lola B2K/40	D	104
18	LMP2	19	(United States) Van der Steur Racing	(United States) Gunnar van der Steur (United Kingdom) Ben Devlin	AER (Nissan) 3.0L V6	D	104
19	GT2	31	(United States) Petersen Motorsports (United States) White Lightning Racing	(United States) Patrick Long (Germany) Jörg Bergmeister	Porsche 911 GT3-RSR	MI	93
19	GT2	31	(United States) Petersen Motorsports (United States) White Lightning Racing	(United States) Patrick Long (Germany) Jörg Bergmeister	Porsche 3.6L Flat-6	MI	93
20 DNF	GT2	51	(Canada) Multimatic Motorsports Team Panoz	(United States) Gunnar Jeannette (United States) Tommy Milner	Panoz Esperante GT-LM	P	57
20 DNF	GT2	51	(Canada) Multimatic Motorsports Team Panoz	(United States) Gunnar Jeannette (United States) Tommy Milner	Ford (Elan) 5.0L V8	P	57
21 DNF	LMP1	20	(United States) Dyson Racing	(United States) Chris Dyson (United Kingdom) Guy Smith	Lola B06/10	MI	3
21 DNF	LMP1	20	(United States) Dyson Racing	(United States) Chris Dyson (United Kingdom) Guy Smith	AER P32T 3.6L Turbo V8	MI	3
22 DNF	GT2	23	(United States) Alex Job Racing	(Germany) Mike Rockenfeller (Germany) Klaus Graf	Porsche 911 GT3-RSR	MI	0
22 DNF	GT2	23	(United States) Alex Job Racing	(Germany) Mike Rockenfeller (Germany) Klaus Graf	Porsche 3.6L Flat-6	MI	0

== Statistics ==
- Pole Position - #6 Penske Racing - 1:12.815
- Fastest Lap - #6 Penske Racing - 1:13.774
- Distance - 269.993 miles (434.512 km)
- Average Speed - 97.974 mph (157.674 km/h)

American Le Mans Series
Previous race: 2006 Lone Star Grand Prix	2006 season	Next race: 2006 New England Grand Prix
