= CarboTech =

German chemical company

CarboTech AC GmbH
- Company type: Production und AC GmbH
- Industry: Chemicals Activated Carbon
- Predecessor: Zeche Elisabeth/Schacht Emil, Bergbauforschungszentrum CarboTech Engineering GmbH Rütgers Chemicals AG RÜTGERS CarboTech GmbH CarboTech AC GmbH
- Founded: 1938
- Successor: International Chemical Investors Group
- Headquarters: Essen, Germany
- Products: Activated carbons, carbon molecular sieves, mobile adsorber rentals, carbon catalysts
- Revenue: €40.3 million (2023)
- Number of employees: About 100 (2024)
- Website: www.carbotech.de/en//

CarboTech AC GmbH is a producer of powdered, granulated and extruded activated carbons in Germany. The company has around 30 years of experience in the production and development of carbon molecular sieves and has customers worldwide.

== Profile ==
The company is located in the heart of the Ruhr metropolitan region (Essen, Germany) and operates integrated production plants for the manufacture, processing and packaging of activated carbons, activated cokes and Carbon Molecular Sieves. CarboTech AC GmbH provides a range of products which include:

- Granular Activated carbons
- Extruded Activated Carbons
- Powdered Activated Carbons
- Impregnated Activated Carbons
- Pool Activated Carbons
- Carbon Molecular Sieves
- Mobile Adsorber Rentals

== History ==
The roots of CarboTech AC GmbH connect to the early 1938, when the foundation of the bituminous coal mining society (Steinkohlenbergbauvereins) has taken place. After World War II, the Bergwerksverband GmbH began setting up experimental facilities for the production and development of activated carbons from bituminous coal. In 1956, a large-scale pilot plant was commissioned on the site of the former Queen Elisabeth coal mine (Zeche Königin Elisabeth) in Essen and in 1958, foundation for the Bergbau-Forschung GmbH as the research institute of bituminous coal mining was established. Later in the 1970s, the development of Carbon Molecular Sieves took place and this enabled the production of 99.999% pure nitrogen and hydrogen by Bergbau-Forschung GmbH. Between the years 1972 and 1980, Bergbau-Forschung received various patents for Pressure swing adsorption plants for nitrogen production and hydrogen purification. In the year 1974, the reactivation of activated carbon using the fluidized bed method was developed by the Bergbau-Forschung. In 1980, a procedure of the dry DeSOx/DeNOx was developed. Until 1988, the activated carbon manufacturer Bergwerksverband was a 100% subsidiary of the Bergbau-Forschung. Later the company underwent several changes and expansions in the product range which include Powdered Activated Carbons and Impregnated Activated Carbons. Between the years 2001 and 2004, CarboTech Aktivkohlen GmbH had spin-off to Rütgers Chemicals AG, Rütgers CarboTech GmbH and finally in the year 2005, the company was taken over by International Chemical Investors Group. Later in the year 2006, the name of the company changed to CarboTech AC GmbH.

In 2016, the heat recovery system for activation and reactivation was expanded and put into use. In 2017 the rotary kiln was also upgraded for reactivation. In 2018, the area for mobile Plug & Clean systems was expanded.

In 2021, the company entered the food, beverage, cement, and automotive markets. The company site was acquired from the lease and the company property at the old production site in Castrop-Rauxel was sold. In 2023, the company expanded to become a full-service provider with an exchange service (including silo and multi-chamber vehicles), cooperation in plant engineering, grinding and packaging systems.

== Group of CarboTech Companies ==
The Bergbau Forschung which was established in 1958 is the root for the company. After several changes due to spin offs and after the take over from the International Chemical Investors Group, in the period between 2010 and 2013, the original company was split into CarboTech AC GmbH, CarboTech Production GmbH and CarboTech Services GmbH.
