= 2003 Grand Prix of Mosport =

Mosport International Raceway

The 2003 Toronto Grand Prix of Mosport was the fifth race of the 2003 American Le Mans Series season. It took place at Mosport International Raceway, Ontario on August 17, 2003.

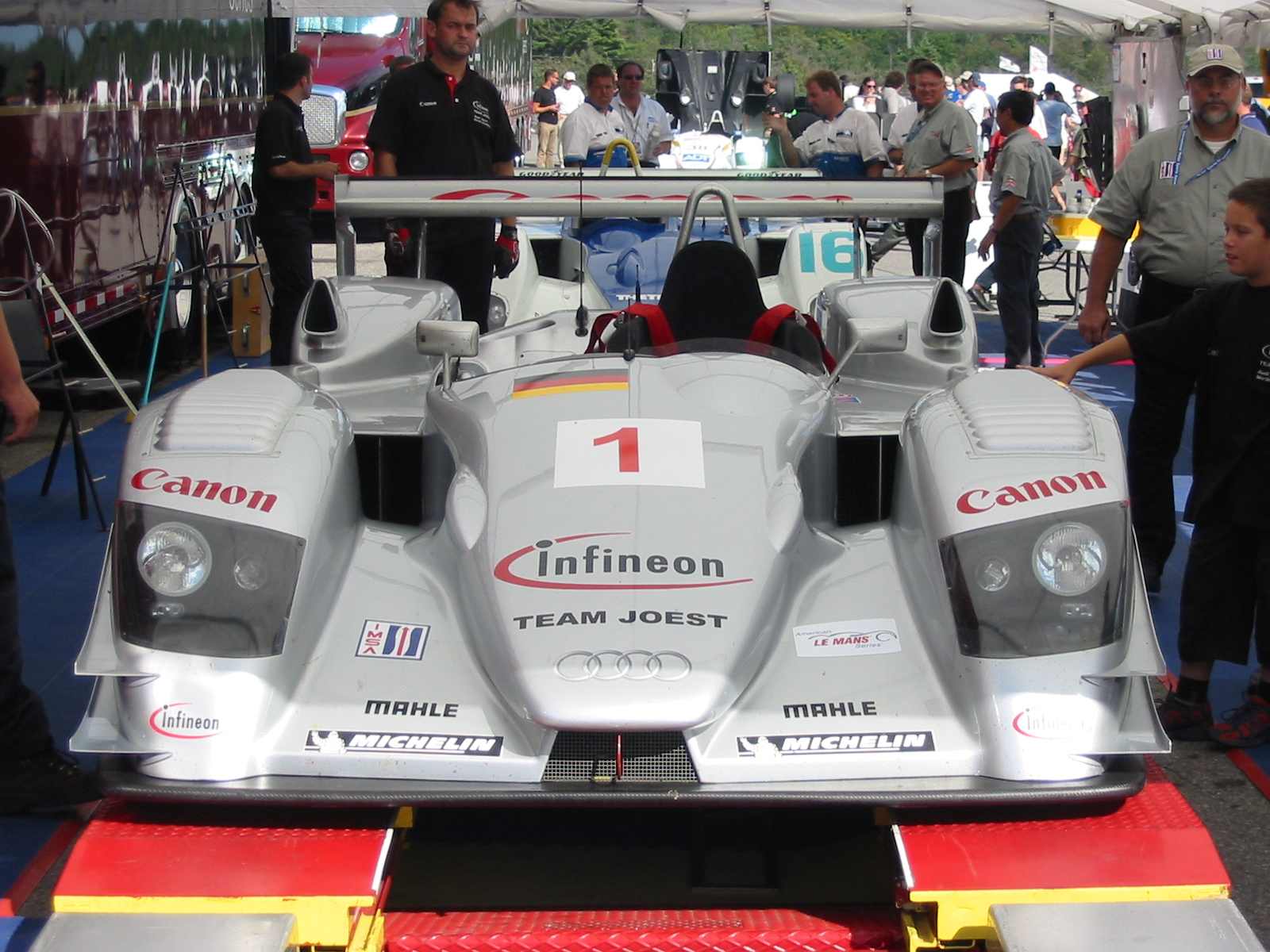
Infineon Team Joest Audi R8 - Winner 2003 Grand Prix of Mosport

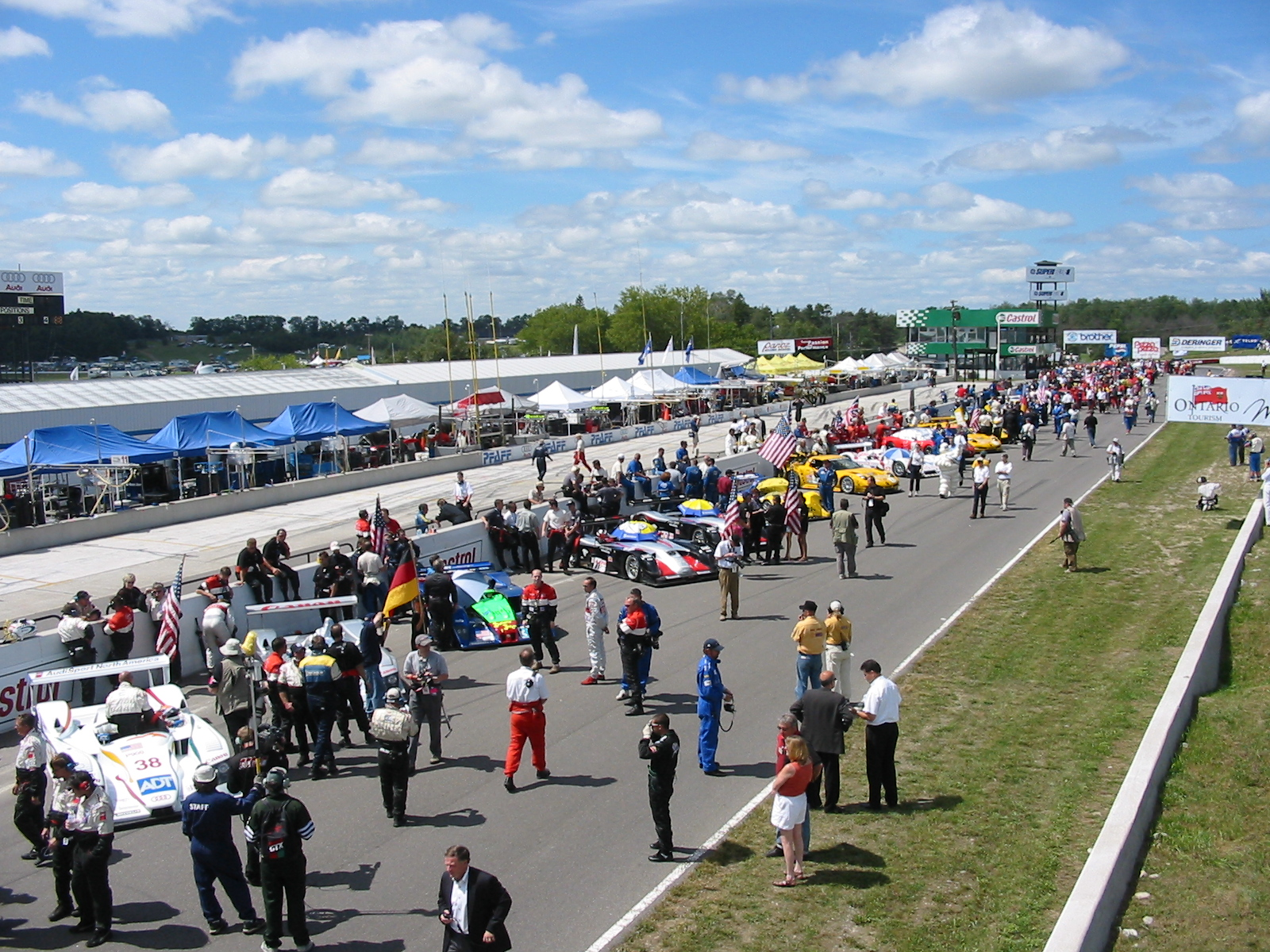
2003 Grand Prix of Mosport grid

== Official results ==
Class winners in bold. Cars failing to complete 75% of winner's distance marked as Not Classified (NC).

Pos	Class	No	Team	Drivers	Chassis	Tyre	Laps
Pos	Class	No	Team	Drivers	Engine	Tyre	Laps
1	**LMP900**	**1**	**(Germany) Infineon Team Joest**	**(Germany) Marco Werner (Germany) Frank Biela**	**Audi R8**	**MI**	**116**
1	**LMP900**	**1**	**(Germany) Infineon Team Joest**	**(Germany) Marco Werner (Germany) Frank Biela**	**Audi 3.6L Turbo V8**	**MI**	**116**
2	**LMP675**	**20**	**(United States) Dyson Racing**	**(United States) Chris Dyson (United Kingdom) Andy Wallace**	**MG-Lola EX257**	**G**	**114**
2	**LMP675**	**20**	**(United States) Dyson Racing**	**(United States) Chris Dyson (United Kingdom) Andy Wallace**	**MG (AER) XP20 2.0L Turbo I4**	**G**	**114**
3	LMP900	11	(United States) JML Team Panoz	(Canada) Scott Maxwell (United States) Gunnar Jeannette	Panoz LMP01 Evo	**MI**	114
3	LMP900	11	(United States) JML Team Panoz	(Canada) Scott Maxwell (United States) Gunnar Jeannette	Élan 6L8 6.0L V8	**MI**	114
4	**GTS**	**3**	**(United States) Corvette Racing**	**(Canada) Ron Fellows (United States) Johnny O'Connell**	**Chevrolet Corvette C5-R**	**G**	**112**
4	**GTS**	**3**	**(United States) Corvette Racing**	**(Canada) Ron Fellows (United States) Johnny O'Connell**	**Chevrolet LS7-R 7.0L V8**	**G**	**112**
5	GTS	88	(United Kingdom) Prodrive	(Czech Republic) Tomáš Enge (Netherlands) Peter Kox	Ferrari 550-GTS Maranello	**MI**	112
5	GTS	88	(United Kingdom) Prodrive	(Czech Republic) Tomáš Enge (Netherlands) Peter Kox	Ferrari 5.9L V12	**MI**	112
6	GTS	80	(United Kingdom) Prodrive	(Australia) David Brabham (Denmark) Jan Magnussen	Ferrari 550-GTS Maranello	**MI**	111
6	GTS	80	(United Kingdom) Prodrive	(Australia) David Brabham (Denmark) Jan Magnussen	Ferrari 5.9L V12	**MI**	111
7	LMP900	10	(United States) JML Team Panoz	(Monaco) Olivier Beretta (Belgium) David Saelens	Panoz LMP01 Evo	**MI**	109
7	LMP900	10	(United States) JML Team Panoz	(Monaco) Olivier Beretta (Belgium) David Saelens	Élan 6L8 6.0L V8	**MI**	109
8	GTS	0	(Italy) Team Olive Garden	(Italy) Emanuele Naspetti (Italy) Mimmo Schiattarella	Ferrari 550 Maranello	**P**	106
8	GTS	0	(Italy) Team Olive Garden	(Italy) Emanuele Naspetti (Italy) Mimmo Schiattarella	Ferrari 6.0L V12	**P**	106
9	**GT**	**24**	**(United States) Alex Job Racing**	**(Germany) Jörg Bergmeister (Germany) Timo Bernhard**	**Porsche 911 GT3-RS**	**MI**	**106**
9	**GT**	**24**	**(United States) Alex Job Racing**	**(Germany) Jörg Bergmeister (Germany) Timo Bernhard**	**Porsche 3.6L Flat-6**	**MI**	**106**
10	GT	35	(United States) Risi Competizione	(United States) Anthony Lazzaro (Germany) Ralf Kelleners	Ferrari 360 Modena GTC	**MI**	105
10	GT	35	(United States) Risi Competizione	(United States) Anthony Lazzaro (Germany) Ralf Kelleners	Ferrari 3.6L V8	**MI**	105
11	GT	43	(United States) Orbit Racing	(Germany) Marc Lieb (United States) Peter Baron	Porsche 911 GT3-RS	**MI**	105
11	GT	43	(United States) Orbit Racing	(Germany) Marc Lieb (United States) Peter Baron	Porsche 3.6L Flat-6	**MI**	105
12	GT	23	(United States) Alex Job Racing	(Germany) Lucas Luhr (Germany) Sascha Maassen	Porsche 911 GT3-RS	**MI**	105
12	GT	23	(United States) Alex Job Racing	(Germany) Lucas Luhr (Germany) Sascha Maassen	Porsche 3.6L Flat-6	**MI**	105
13	GT	60	(United Kingdom) P.K. Sport	(United Kingdom) Robin Liddell (United States) Vic Rice	Porsche 911 GT3-RS	**P**	105
13	GT	60	(United Kingdom) P.K. Sport	(United Kingdom) Robin Liddell (United States) Vic Rice	Porsche 3.6L Flat-6	**P**	105
14	GTS	71	(United States) Carsport America	(United States) Tom Wieckardt (France) Jean-Philippe Belloc	Dodge Viper GTS-R	**P**	104
14	GTS	71	(United States) Carsport America	(United States) Tom Wieckardt (France) Jean-Philippe Belloc	Dodge 8.0L V10	**P**	104
15	GT	79	(United States) J3 Racing	(United States) David Murry (United States) Justin Jackson	Porsche 911 GT3-RS	**MI**	103
15	GT	79	(United States) J3 Racing	(United States) David Murry (United States) Justin Jackson	Porsche 3.6L Flat-6	**MI**	103
16	GT	32	(Canada) Ferri Competizione	(Italy) Andrea Bertolini (Italy) Mauro Baldi	Ferrari 360 Modena GTC	?	103
16	GT	32	(Canada) Ferri Competizione	(Italy) Andrea Bertolini (Italy) Mauro Baldi	Ferrari 3.6L V8	?	103
17	GT	63	(United States) ACEMCO Motorsports	(United States) Terry Borcheller (United States) Shane Lewis	Ferrari 360 Modena GTC	**Y**	103
17	GT	63	(United States) ACEMCO Motorsports	(United States) Terry Borcheller (United States) Shane Lewis	Ferrari 3.6L V8	**Y**	103
18	GT	68	(United States) The Racer's Group	(United States) Marc Bunting (United States) Chris Gleason	Porsche 911 GT3-RS	**MI**	102
18	GT	68	(United States) The Racer's Group	(United States) Marc Bunting (United States) Chris Gleason	Porsche 3.6L Flat-6	**MI**	102
19	GT	28	(United States) JMB Racing USA	(France) Stéphane Grégoire (Chile) Eliseo Salazar (Switzerland) Iradj Alexander	Ferrari 360 Modena GTC	**P**	102
19	GT	28	(United States) JMB Racing USA	(France) Stéphane Grégoire (Chile) Eliseo Salazar (Switzerland) Iradj Alexander	Ferrari 3.6L V8	**P**	102
20	LMP900	38	(United States) ADT Champion Racing	(United Kingdom) Johnny Herbert (Finland) JJ Lehto	Audi R8	**MI**	102
20	LMP900	38	(United States) ADT Champion Racing	(United Kingdom) Johnny Herbert (Finland) JJ Lehto	Audi 3.6L Turbo V8	**MI**	102
21	GT	67	(United States) The Racer's Group	(United States) Michael Schrom (Canada) Jeffrey Pabst	Porsche 911 GT3-RS	**MI**	101
21	GT	67	(United States) The Racer's Group	(United States) Michael Schrom (Canada) Jeffrey Pabst	Porsche 3.6L Flat-6	**MI**	101
22	LMP675	56	(United States) Team Bucknum Racing	(United States) Jeff Bucknum (United States) Bryan Willman (United States) Chris McMurry	Pilbeam MP91	**D**	101
22	LMP675	56	(United States) Team Bucknum Racing	(United States) Jeff Bucknum (United States) Bryan Willman (United States) Chris McMurry	Willman (JPX) 3.4L V6	**D**	101
23	GT	61	(United Kingdom) P.K. Sport	(United Kingdom) Piers Masarati (Canada) John Graham	Porsche 911 GT3-R	**P**	100
23	GT	61	(United Kingdom) P.K. Sport	(United Kingdom) Piers Masarati (Canada) John Graham	Porsche 3.6L Flat-6	**P**	100
24	LMP675	16	(United States) Dyson Racing	(United States) Butch Leitzinger (United Kingdom) James Weaver	MG-Lola EX257	**G**	100
24	LMP675	16	(United States) Dyson Racing	(United States) Butch Leitzinger (United Kingdom) James Weaver	MG (AER) XP20 2.0L Turbo I4	**G**	100
25	GT	29	(United States) JMB Racing USA	(Netherlands) Peter Kutemann (France) Antoine Gosse	Ferrari 360 Modena GTC	**P**	98
25	GT	29	(United States) JMB Racing USA	(Netherlands) Peter Kutemann (France) Antoine Gosse	Ferrari 3.6L V8	**P**	98
26	LMP675	18	(United States) Essex Racing	(United States) Melanie Paterson (United States) Jason Workman	Lola B2K/40	**P**	98
26	LMP675	18	(United States) Essex Racing	(United States) Melanie Paterson (United States) Jason Workman	Nissan (AER) VQL 3.0L V6	**P**	98
27 DNF	GTS	2	(Germany) Konrad Motorsport	(United States) Mark Neuhaus (Austria) Walter Lechner Jr.	Saleen S7-R	**D**	80
27 DNF	GTS	2	(Germany) Konrad Motorsport	(United States) Mark Neuhaus (Austria) Walter Lechner Jr.	Ford 7.0L V8	**D**	80
28 DNF	LMP900	30	(United States) Intersport Racing	(United States) Clint Field (France) Georges Forgeois	Lola B2K/10B	**G**	65
28 DNF	LMP900	30	(United States) Intersport Racing	(United States) Clint Field (France) Georges Forgeois	Judd GV4 4.0L V10	**G**	65
29 DNF	GT	52	(Germany) Seikel Motorsport	(Canada) Tony Burgess (Canada) David Shep	Porsche 911 GT3-RS	**Y**	49
29 DNF	GT	52	(Germany) Seikel Motorsport	(Canada) Tony Burgess (Canada) David Shep	Porsche 3.6L Flat-6	**Y**	49
30 DNF	LMP675	37	(United States) Intersport Racing	(United States) Jon Field (United States) Duncan Dayton	MG-Lola EX257	**G**	29
30 DNF	LMP675	37	(United States) Intersport Racing	(United States) Jon Field (United States) Duncan Dayton	MG (AER) XP20 2.0L Turbo I4	**G**	29
31 DNF	GTS	4	(United States) Corvette Racing	(United States) Kelly Collins (United Kingdom) Oliver Gavin	Chevrolet Corvette C5-R	**G**	24
31 DNF	GTS	4	(United States) Corvette Racing	(United States) Kelly Collins (United Kingdom) Oliver Gavin	Chevrolet LS7-R 7.0L V8	**G**	24
32 DNF	GT	66	(United States) The Racer's Group	(United States) Kevin Buckler (United States) Cort Wagner	Porsche 911 GT3-RS	**MI**	15
32 DNF	GT	66	(United States) The Racer's Group	(United States) Kevin Buckler (United States) Cort Wagner	Porsche 3.6L Flat-6	**MI**	15
33 DNF	LMP900	12	(United States) American Spirit Racing	(United States) Michael Lewis (United States) Tomy Drissi	Riley & Scott Mk III C	**D**	11
33 DNF	LMP900	12	(United States) American Spirit Racing	(United States) Michael Lewis (United States) Tomy Drissi	Lincoln (Élan) 5.0L V8	**D**	11
FINAL RACE RESULTS

== Statistics ==
- Pole Position - #16 Dyson Racing - 1:07.906
- Fastest Lap - #16 Dyson Racing - 1:09.479
- Distance - 459.056 km
- Average Speed - 166.189 km/h

American Le Mans Series
Previous race: 2003 Grand Prix de Trois-Rivières	2003 season	Next race: 2003 Road America 500
