= 2003 Monterey Sports Car Championships =

Track map of Mazda Raceway Laguna Seca

The 2003 Fry's Electronics Sports Car Championships was the seventh race of the 2003 American Le Mans Series season. It took place at Mazda Raceway Laguna Seca, California on September 7, 2003.

== Official results ==
Class winners in bold. Cars failing to complete 75% of winner's distance marked as Not Classified (NC).

Pos	Class	No	Team	Drivers	Chassis	Tyre	Laps
Pos	Class	No	Team	Drivers	Engine	Tyre	Laps
1	**LMP900**	**1**	**(Germany) Infineon Team Joest**	**(Germany) Marco Werner (Germany) Frank Biela**	**Audi R8**	M	**120**
1	**LMP900**	**1**	**(Germany) Infineon Team Joest**	**(Germany) Marco Werner (Germany) Frank Biela**	**Audi 3.6L Turbo V8**	M	**120**
2	**LMP675**	**16**	**(United States) Dyson Racing**	**(United States) Butch Leitzinger (United Kingdom) James Weaver**	**MG-Lola EX257**	G	**120**
2	**LMP675**	**16**	**(United States) Dyson Racing**	**(United States) Butch Leitzinger (United Kingdom) James Weaver**	**MG (AER) XP20 2.0L Turbo I4**	G	**120**
3	LMP900	10	(United States) JML Team Panoz	(Monaco) Olivier Beretta (Belgium) David Saelens	Panoz LMP01 Evo	M	118
3	LMP900	10	(United States) JML Team Panoz	(Monaco) Olivier Beretta (Belgium) David Saelens	Élan 6L8 6.0L V8	M	118
4	LMP900	38	(United States) ADT Champion Racing	(United Kingdom) Johnny Herbert (Finland) JJ Lehto	Audi R8	M	115
4	LMP900	38	(United States) ADT Champion Racing	(United Kingdom) Johnny Herbert (Finland) JJ Lehto	Audi 3.6L Turbo V8	M	115
5	LMP900	12	(United States) American Spirit Racing	(United States) Michael Lewis (United States) Tomy Drissi	Riley & Scott Mk III C	D	113
5	LMP900	12	(United States) American Spirit Racing	(United States) Michael Lewis (United States) Tomy Drissi	Lincoln (Élan) 5.0L V8	D	113
6	**GTS**	**80**	**(United Kingdom) Prodrive**	**(Australia) David Brabham (Denmark) Jan Magnussen**	**Ferrari 550-GTS Maranello**	M	**113**
6	**GTS**	**80**	**(United Kingdom) Prodrive**	**(Australia) David Brabham (Denmark) Jan Magnussen**	**Ferrari 5.9L V12**	M	**113**
7	LMP900	30	(United States) Intersport Racing	(United States) Clint Field (United States) Rick Sutherland	Riley & Scott Mk III C	D	112
7	LMP900	30	(United States) Intersport Racing	(United States) Clint Field (United States) Rick Sutherland	Élan 6L8 6.0L V8	D	112
8	GTS	3	(United States) Corvette Racing	(Canada) Ron Fellows (United States) Johnny O'Connell	Chevrolet Corvette C5-R	G	112
8	GTS	3	(United States) Corvette Racing	(Canada) Ron Fellows (United States) Johnny O'Connell	Chevrolet 7.0L V8	G	112
9	GTS	4	(United States) Corvette Racing	(United States) Kelly Collins (United Kingdom) Oliver Gavin	Chevrolet Corvette C5-R	G	111
9	GTS	4	(United States) Corvette Racing	(United States) Kelly Collins (United Kingdom) Oliver Gavin	Chevrolet 7.0L V8	G	111
10	GTS	0	(Italy) Team Olive Garden	(Italy) Emanuele Naspetti (United States) Bill Auberlen	Ferrari 550 Maranello	P	110
10	GTS	0	(Italy) Team Olive Garden	(Italy) Emanuele Naspetti (United States) Bill Auberlen	Ferrari 6.0L V12	P	110
11	**GT**	**23**	**(United States) Alex Job Racing**	**(Germany) Lucas Luhr (Germany) Sascha Maassen**	**Porsche 911 GT3-RS**	M	**108**
11	**GT**	**23**	**(United States) Alex Job Racing**	**(Germany) Lucas Luhr (Germany) Sascha Maassen**	**Porsche 3.6L Flat-6**	M	**108**
12	GTS	71	(United States) Carsport America	(United States) Tom Weickardt (France) Jean-Philippe Belloc	Dodge Viper GTS-R	P	108
12	GTS	71	(United States) Carsport America	(United States) Tom Weickardt (France) Jean-Philippe Belloc	Dodge 8.0L V10	P	108
13	GT	35	(United States) Risi Competizione	(United States) Anthony Lazzaro (Germany) Ralf Kelleners	Ferrari 360 Modena GTC	M	107
13	GT	35	(United States) Risi Competizione	(United States) Anthony Lazzaro (Germany) Ralf Kelleners	Ferrari 3.6L V8	M	107
14	GT	31	(United States) Petersen Motorsports (United States) White Lightning Racing	(United States) Craig Stanton (United Kingdom) Johnny Mowlem	Porsche 911 GT3-RS	M	107
14	GT	31	(United States) Petersen Motorsports (United States) White Lightning Racing	(United States) Craig Stanton (United Kingdom) Johnny Mowlem	Porsche 3.6L Flat-6	M	107
15	GT	60	(United Kingdom) P.K. Sport	(United Kingdom) Robin Liddell (Italy) Alex Caffi	Porsche 911 GT3-RS	P	106
15	GT	60	(United Kingdom) P.K. Sport	(United Kingdom) Robin Liddell (Italy) Alex Caffi	Porsche 3.6L Flat-6	P	106
16	GT	66	(United States) The Racer's Group	(United States) Kevin Buckler (United States) Cort Wagner	Porsche 911 GT3-RS	M	106
16	GT	66	(United States) The Racer's Group	(United States) Kevin Buckler (United States) Cort Wagner	Porsche 3.6L Flat-6	M	106
17	LMP675	18	(United States) Essex Racing	(United States) Scott Bradley (United States) Jason Workman	Lola B2K/40	P	106
17	LMP675	18	(United States) Essex Racing	(United States) Scott Bradley (United States) Jason Workman	Nissan (AER) VQL 3.0L V6	P	106
18	GT	28	(United States) JMB Racing USA	(France) Stéphane Grégoire (Switzerland) Iradj Alexander (Chile) Eliseo Salazar	Ferrari 360 Modena GTC	P	105
18	GT	28	(United States) JMB Racing USA	(France) Stéphane Grégoire (Switzerland) Iradj Alexander (Chile) Eliseo Salazar	Ferrari 3.6L V8	P	105
19	GT	63	(United States) ACEMCO Motorsports	(United States) Terry Borcheller (United States) Shane Lewis	Ferrari 360 Modena GTC	Y	105
19	GT	63	(United States) ACEMCO Motorsports	(United States) Terry Borcheller (United States) Shane Lewis	Ferrari 3.6L V8	Y	105
20	GT	68	(United States) The Racer's Group	(United States) Marc Bunting (United States) Chris Gleason	Porsche 911 GT3-RS	M	104
20	GT	68	(United States) The Racer's Group	(United States) Marc Bunting (United States) Chris Gleason	Porsche 3.6L Flat-6	M	104
21	GT	24	(United States) Alex Job Racing	(Germany) Jörg Bergmeister (Germany) Timo Bernhard	Porsche 911 GT3-RS	M	104
21	GT	24	(United States) Alex Job Racing	(Germany) Jörg Bergmeister (Germany) Timo Bernhard	Porsche 3.6L Flat-6	M	104
22	GT	67	(United States) The Racer's Group	(United States) Michael Schrom (Germany) Pierre Ehret	Porsche 911 GT3-RS	M	104
22	GT	67	(United States) The Racer's Group	(United States) Michael Schrom (Germany) Pierre Ehret	Porsche 3.6L Flat-6	M	104
23	GT	42	(United States) Orbit Racing	(United States) Joe Policastro (United States) Joe Policastro Jr.	Porsche 911 GT3-RS	M	103
23	GT	42	(United States) Orbit Racing	(United States) Joe Policastro (United States) Joe Policastro Jr.	Porsche 3.6L Flat-6	M	103
24	GT	61	(United Kingdom) P.K. Sport	(United Kingdom) David Warnock (United States) Vic Rice	Porsche 911 GT3-R	P	103
24	GT	61	(United Kingdom) P.K. Sport	(United Kingdom) David Warnock (United States) Vic Rice	Porsche 3.6L Flat-6	P	103
25	GT	29	(United States) JMB Racing USA	(United States) Stephen Earle (United States) Mark Neuhaus	Ferrari 360 Modena GTC	P	101
25	GT	29	(United States) JMB Racing USA	(United States) Stephen Earle (United States) Mark Neuhaus	Ferrari 3.6L V8	P	101
26	LMP675	37	(United States) Intersport Racing	(United States) Jon Field (United States) Duncan Dayton	MG-Lola EX257	G	101
26	LMP675	37	(United States) Intersport Racing	(United States) Jon Field (United States) Duncan Dayton	MG (AER) XP20 2.0L Turbo I4	G	101
27	GT	43	(United States) Orbit Racing	(United States) Leo Hindery (United States) Peter Baron	Porsche 911 GT3-RS	M	98
27	GT	43	(United States) Orbit Racing	(United States) Leo Hindery (United States) Peter Baron	Porsche 3.6L Flat-6	M	98
28 DNF	GT	03	(United States) Hyper Sport	(United States) Rick Skelton (United States) Brad Nyberg (United States) Joe Foster	Panoz Esperante GT-LM	P	95
28 DNF	GT	03	(United States) Hyper Sport	(United States) Rick Skelton (United States) Brad Nyberg (United States) Joe Foster	Élan 5.0L V8	P	95
29 NC	GT	79	(United States) J3 Racing	(United States) David Murry (United States) Justin Jackson	Porsche 911 GT3-RS	M	84
29 NC	GT	79	(United States) J3 Racing	(United States) David Murry (United States) Justin Jackson	Porsche 3.6L Flat-6	M	84
30 DNF	LMP675	20	(United States) Dyson Racing	(United States) Chris Dyson (United Kingdom) Andy Wallace	MG-Lola EX257	G	40
30 DNF	LMP675	20	(United States) Dyson Racing	(United States) Chris Dyson (United Kingdom) Andy Wallace	MG (AER) XP20 2.0L Turbo I4	G	40
31 DNF	GT	89	(United States) Inline Cunningham Racing	(United States) Oswaldo Negri Jr. (United States) Burt Frisselle	Porsche 911 GT3-RS	Y	36
31 DNF	GT	89	(United States) Inline Cunningham Racing	(United States) Oswaldo Negri Jr. (United States) Burt Frisselle	Porsche 3.6L Flat-6	Y	36
32 DNF	LMP675	56	(United States) Team Bucknum Racing	(United States) Jeff Bucknum (United States) Bryan Willman (United States) Chris McMurry	Pilbeam MP91	D	26
32 DNF	LMP675	56	(United States) Team Bucknum Racing	(United States) Jeff Bucknum (United States) Bryan Willman (United States) Chris McMurry	Willman (JPX) 3.4L V6	D	26
33 DNF	GT	33	(United States) ZIP Racing	(United States) Andy Lally (United States) Spencer Pumpelly	Porsche 911 GT3-RS	D	16
33 DNF	GT	33	(United States) ZIP Racing	(United States) Andy Lally (United States) Spencer Pumpelly	Porsche 3.6L Flat-6	D	16
DSQ^{†}	GTS	88	(United Kingdom) Prodrive	(Czech Republic) Tomáš Enge (Netherlands) Peter Kox	Ferrari 550-GTS Maranello	M	113
DSQ^{†}	GTS	88	(United Kingdom) Prodrive	(Czech Republic) Tomáš Enge (Netherlands) Peter Kox	Ferrari 5.9L V12	M	113
DNS	LMP900	11	(United States) JML Team Panoz	(Switzerland) Benjamin Leuenberger (United States) Gunnar Jeannette	Panoz LMP01 Evo	M	-
DNS	LMP900	11	(United States) JML Team Panoz	(Switzerland) Benjamin Leuenberger (United States) Gunnar Jeannette	Élan 6L8 6.0L V8	M	-

† - #88 Prodrive was disqualified for failing post-race technical inspection. The car featured an illegal air intake.

== Statistics ==
- Pole Position - #1 Infineon Team Joest - 1:16.224
- Fastest Lap - #1 Infineon Team Joest - 1:17.757
- Distance - 432.205 km
- Average Speed - 156.684 km/h

American Le Mans Series
Previous race: 2003 Road America 500	2003 season	Next race: 2003 Grand Prix Americas
