= 2003 Road America 500 =

Track map of Road America.

The 2003 Road America 500 was the sixth race of the 2003 American Le Mans Series season. It took place at Road America, Wisconsin on August 24, 2003.

== Official results ==
Class winners in bold. Cars failing to complete 75% of winner's distance marked as Not Classified (NC).

Pos	Class	No	Team	Drivers	Chassis	Tyre	Laps
Pos	Class	No	Team	Drivers	Engine	Tyre	Laps
1	**LMP900**	**38**	**(United States) ADT Champion Racing**	**(United Kingdom) Johnny Herbert (Finland) JJ Lehto**	**Audi R8**	MI	**79**
1	**LMP900**	**38**	**(United States) ADT Champion Racing**	**(United Kingdom) Johnny Herbert (Finland) JJ Lehto**	**Audi 3.6L Turbo V8**	MI	**79**
2	**LMP675**	**20**	**(United States) Dyson Racing**	**(United States) Chris Dyson (United Kingdom) Andy Wallace**	**MG-Lola EX257**	G	**78**
2	**LMP675**	**20**	**(United States) Dyson Racing**	**(United States) Chris Dyson (United Kingdom) Andy Wallace**	**MG (AER) XP20 2.0L Turbo I4**	G	**78**
3	LMP900	10	(United States) JML Team Panoz	(Monaco) Olivier Beretta (Belgium) David Saelens	Panoz LMP01 Evo	MI	78
3	LMP900	10	(United States) JML Team Panoz	(Monaco) Olivier Beretta (Belgium) David Saelens	Élan 6L8 6.0L V8	MI	78
4	**GTS**	**80**	**(United Kingdom) Prodrive**	**(Australia) David Brabham (Denmark) Jan Magnussen**	**Ferrari 550-GTS Maranello**	MI	**75**
4	**GTS**	**80**	**(United Kingdom) Prodrive**	**(Australia) David Brabham (Denmark) Jan Magnussen**	**Ferrari 5.9L V12**	MI	**75**
5	GTS	3	(United States) Corvette Racing	(Canada) Ron Fellows (United States) Johnny O'Connell	Chevrolet Corvette C5-R	G	75
5	GTS	3	(United States) Corvette Racing	(Canada) Ron Fellows (United States) Johnny O'Connell	Chevrolet 7.0L V8	G	75
6	GTS	88	(United Kingdom) Prodrive	(Czech Republic) Tomáš Enge (Netherlands) Peter Kox	Ferrari 550-GTS Maranello	MI	74
6	GTS	88	(United Kingdom) Prodrive	(Czech Republic) Tomáš Enge (Netherlands) Peter Kox	Ferrari 5.9L V12	MI	74
7	LMP900	1	(Germany) Infineon Team Joest	(Germany) Marco Werner (Germany) Frank Biela	Audi R8	MI	73
7	LMP900	1	(Germany) Infineon Team Joest	(Germany) Marco Werner (Germany) Frank Biela	Audi 3.6L Turbo V8	MI	73
8	GTS	0	(Italy) Team Olive Garden	(Italy) Emanuele Naspetti (Italy) Mimmo Schiattarella	Ferrari 550 Maranello	P	73
8	GTS	0	(Italy) Team Olive Garden	(Italy) Emanuele Naspetti (Italy) Mimmo Schiattarella	Ferrari 6.0L V12	P	73
9	GTS	4	(United States) Corvette Racing	(United States) Kelly Collins (United Kingdom) Oliver Gavin	Chevrolet Corvette C5-R	G	73
9	GTS	4	(United States) Corvette Racing	(United States) Kelly Collins (United Kingdom) Oliver Gavin	Chevrolet 7.0L V8	G	73
10	LMP900	11	(United States) JML Team Panoz	(Switzerland) Benjamin Leuenberger (United States) Gunnar Jeannette	Panoz LMP01 Evo	MI	73
10	LMP900	11	(United States) JML Team Panoz	(Switzerland) Benjamin Leuenberger (United States) Gunnar Jeannette	Élan 6L8 6.0L V8	MI	73
11	GTS	2	(Germany) Konrad Motorsport	(Austria) Franz Konrad (Germany) Wolfgang Kaufmann	Saleen S7-R	D	73
11	GTS	2	(Germany) Konrad Motorsport	(Austria) Franz Konrad (Germany) Wolfgang Kaufmann	Ford 7.0L V8	D	73
12	LMP900	30	(United States) Intersport Racing	(United States) Clint Field (United States) Rick Sutherland	Riley & Scott Mk III C	D	72
12	LMP900	30	(United States) Intersport Racing	(United States) Clint Field (United States) Rick Sutherland	Élan 6L8 6.0L V8	D	72
13	**GT**	**31**	**(United States) Petersen Motorsports (United States) White Lightning Racing**	**(United States) Craig Stanton (United Kingdom) Johnny Mowlem**	**Porsche 911 GT3-RS**	MI	**72**
13	**GT**	**31**	**(United States) Petersen Motorsports (United States) White Lightning Racing**	**(United States) Craig Stanton (United Kingdom) Johnny Mowlem**	**Porsche 3.6L Flat-6**	MI	**72**
14	LMP900	12	(United States) American Spirit Racing	(United States) Michael Lewis (United States) Tomy Drissi	Riley & Scott Mk III C	D	72
14	LMP900	12	(United States) American Spirit Racing	(United States) Michael Lewis (United States) Tomy Drissi	Lincoln (Élan) 5.0L V8	D	72
15	GT	66	(United States) The Racer's Group	(United States) Kevin Buckler (United States) Cort Wagner	Porsche 911 GT3-RS	MI	71
15	GT	66	(United States) The Racer's Group	(United States) Kevin Buckler (United States) Cort Wagner	Porsche 3.6L Flat-6	MI	71
16	GT	33	(United States) ZIP Racing	(United States) Andy Lally (United States) Spencer Pumpelly	Porsche 911 GT3-RS	D	71
16	GT	33	(United States) ZIP Racing	(United States) Andy Lally (United States) Spencer Pumpelly	Porsche 3.6L Flat-6	D	71
17	GT	23	(United States) Alex Job Racing	(Germany) Lucas Luhr (Germany) Sascha Maassen	Porsche 911 GT3-RS	MI	71
17	GT	23	(United States) Alex Job Racing	(Germany) Lucas Luhr (Germany) Sascha Maassen	Porsche 3.6L Flat-6	MI	71
18	GT	67	(United States) The Racer's Group	(United States) Michael Schrom (Germany) Pierre Ehret	Porsche 911 GT3-RS	MI	70
18	GT	67	(United States) The Racer's Group	(United States) Michael Schrom (Germany) Pierre Ehret	Porsche 3.6L Flat-6	MI	70
19	GT	52	(Germany) Seikel Motorsport	(United States) Philip Collin (United States) John Lloyd	Porsche 911 GT3-RS	Y	70
19	GT	52	(Germany) Seikel Motorsport	(United States) Philip Collin (United States) John Lloyd	Porsche 3.6L Flat-6	Y	70
20	GT	68	(United States) The Racer's Group	(United States) Marc Bunting (United States) Chris Gleason	Porsche 911 GT3-RS	MI	70
20	GT	68	(United States) The Racer's Group	(United States) Marc Bunting (United States) Chris Gleason	Porsche 3.6L Flat-6	MI	70
21	GT	63	(United States) ACEMCO Motorsports	(United States) Terry Borcheller (United States) Shane Lewis	Ferrari 360 Modena GTC	Y	69
21	GT	63	(United States) ACEMCO Motorsports	(United States) Terry Borcheller (United States) Shane Lewis	Ferrari 3.6L V8	Y	69
22	GT	79	(United States) J3 Racing	(United States) David Murry (United States) Justin Jackson	Porsche 911 GT3-RS	MI	69
22	GT	79	(United States) J3 Racing	(United States) David Murry (United States) Justin Jackson	Porsche 3.6L Flat-6	MI	69
23	GT	61	(United Kingdom) P.K. Sport	(United Kingdom) Piers Masarati (United States) Vic Rice	Porsche 911 GT3-R	P	69
23	GT	61	(United Kingdom) P.K. Sport	(United Kingdom) Piers Masarati (United States) Vic Rice	Porsche 3.6L Flat-6	P	69
24	GT	42	(United States) Orbit Racing	(United States) Leo Hindery (United States) Joe Policastro (United States) Joe Policastro Jr.	Porsche 911 GT3-RS	MI	68
24	GT	42	(United States) Orbit Racing	(United States) Leo Hindery (United States) Joe Policastro (United States) Joe Policastro Jr.	Porsche 3.6L Flat-6	MI	68
25	LMP675	18	(United States) Essex Racing	(United States) James Gue (United States) Jason Workman	Lola B2K/40	P	68
25	LMP675	18	(United States) Essex Racing	(United States) James Gue (United States) Jason Workman	Nissan (AER) VQL 3.0L V6	P	68
26	LMP675	64	(United States) Downing Atlanta Inc.	(United States) Jim Downing (United States) Howart Katz	WR LMP-02	D	67
26	LMP675	64	(United States) Downing Atlanta Inc.	(United States) Jim Downing (United States) Howart Katz	Mazda R26B 2.6L 4-Rotor	D	67
27	GTS	17	(United States) Carsport America	(United States) Tom Weickardt (United States) Joe Ellis (United States) Romeo Kapudija	Dodge Viper GTS-R	P	64
27	GTS	17	(United States) Carsport America	(United States) Tom Weickardt (United States) Joe Ellis (United States) Romeo Kapudija	Dodge 8.0L V8	P	64
28	LMP675	37	(United States) Intersport Racing	(United States) Jon Field (United States) Duncan Dayton	MG-Lola EX257	G	60
28	LMP675	37	(United States) Intersport Racing	(United States) Jon Field (United States) Duncan Dayton	MG (AER) XP20 2.0L Turbo I4	G	60
29	LMP675	56	(United States) Team Bucknum Racing	(United States) Jeff Bucknum (United States) Bryan Willman (United States) Chris McMurry	Pilbeam MP91	D	59
29	LMP675	56	(United States) Team Bucknum Racing	(United States) Jeff Bucknum (United States) Bryan Willman (United States) Chris McMurry	Willman (JPX) 3.4L V6	D	59
30 DNF	GT	35	(United States) Risi Competizione	(United States) Anthony Lazzaro (Germany) Ralf Kelleners	Ferrari 360 Modena GTC	MI	57
30 DNF	GT	35	(United States) Risi Competizione	(United States) Anthony Lazzaro (Germany) Ralf Kelleners	Ferrari 3.6L V8	MI	57
31 NC	GT	24	(United States) Alex Job Racing	(Germany) Jörg Bergmeister (Germany) Timo Bernhard	Porsche 911 GT3-RS	MI	57
31 NC	GT	24	(United States) Alex Job Racing	(Germany) Jörg Bergmeister (Germany) Timo Bernhard	Porsche 3.6L Flat-6	MI	57
32 DNF	GT	60	(United Kingdom) P.K. Sport	(United Kingdom) Robin Liddell (Australia) Alex Davison	Porsche 911 GT3-RS	P	51
32 DNF	GT	60	(United Kingdom) P.K. Sport	(United Kingdom) Robin Liddell (Australia) Alex Davison	Porsche 3.6L Flat-6	P	51
33 DNF	GT	43	(United States) Orbit Racing	(Germany) Marc Lieb (United States) Peter Baron	Porsche 911 GT3-RS	MI	37
33 DNF	GT	43	(United States) Orbit Racing	(Germany) Marc Lieb (United States) Peter Baron	Porsche 3.6L Flat-6	MI	37
34 DNF	GT	29	(United States) JMB Racing USA	(Netherlands) Peter Kutemann (United States) Philip Shearer	Ferrari 360 Modena GTC	P	26
34 DNF	GT	29	(United States) JMB Racing USA	(Netherlands) Peter Kutemann (United States) Philip Shearer	Ferrari 3.6L V8	P	26
35 DNF	GT	28	(United States) JMB Racing USA	(France) Stéphane Grégoire (Switzerland) Iradj Alexander	Ferrari 360 Modena GTC	P	26
35 DNF	GT	28	(United States) JMB Racing USA	(France) Stéphane Grégoire (Switzerland) Iradj Alexander	Ferrari 3.6L V8	P	26
36 DNF	LMP675	16	(United States) Dyson Racing	(United States) Butch Leitzinger (United Kingdom) James Weaver	MG-Lola EX257	G	8
36 DNF	LMP675	16	(United States) Dyson Racing	(United States) Butch Leitzinger (United Kingdom) James Weaver	MG (AER) XP20 2.0L Turbo I4	G	8
DNS	GTS	71	(United States) Carsport America	(United States) Jeff Altenburg (France) Jean-Philippe Belloc	Dodge Viper GTS-R	P	-
DNS	GTS	71	(United States) Carsport America	(United States) Jeff Altenburg (France) Jean-Philippe Belloc	Dodge 8.0L V10	P	-

== Statistics ==
- Pole Position - #1 Infineon Team Joest - 1:52.265
- Fastest Lap - #1 Infineon Team Joest - 1:54.613
- Distance - 514.655 km
- Average Speed - 185.623 km/h

American Le Mans Series
Previous race: 2003 Grand Prix of Mosport	2003 season	Next race: 2003 Monterey Sports Car Championships
