= Porsche 911 RSR =

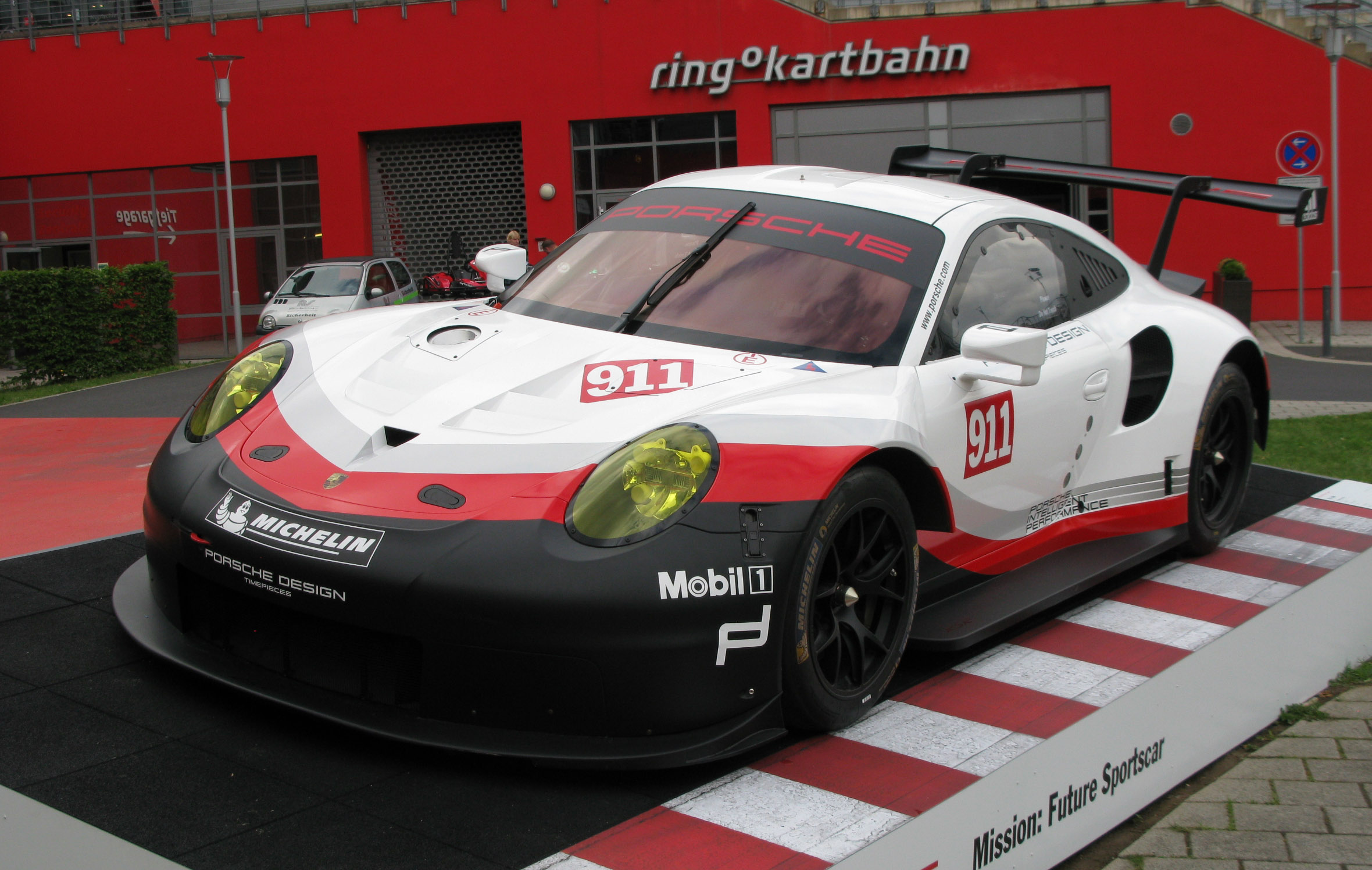
- 2017 Porsche 911 RSR

Overview
- Manufacturer: Porsche
- Production: 1999–2023
- Assembly: Germany: Weissach

Body and chassis
- Class: GT Endurance
- Body style: 2-door coupé
- Layout: Rear-engine, rear-wheel-drive (1996 to 2016); Rear mid-engine, rear-wheel-drive layout (2017-2023)

Powertrain
- Engine: 3.8 L – 4.2 L Flat-6

The Porsche 911 RSR and its predecessor GT3 RSR, GT3 RS and GT3 R were a line of GT racing cars produced by Porsche that are used in motorsport for endurance races. They are based on the then highest class in GT racing worldwide, the GTE class from ACO. These regulations lead back to the concept of a GT3 class below the then Group GT1 and GT2 from 1998. After the discontinuation of the GT1 class, the planned GT3 class was from 1999 at the ACO as a GT class below the GTS, as well advertised by the FIA from 2000 as N-GT. After the alignment of the GT rules between FIA and ACO in 2005, this class was renamed GT2 class. When the FIA's GT2 European Championship failed and the participants in the GT1 class at the 24 Hours of Le Mans dwindled, the ACO renamed the GT2 class GTE in 2011 and divided it into GTE-Pro for professionals and GTE-AM for amateurs. Over the years, Porsche was continuously represented in this class with different series of the 911.

In addition, the Porsche 911 also served as the basis for the higher classes with the Porsche 911 GT1 and Porsche 911 GT2. Since 2006, Porsche has been represented in the newly formed GT3 class with the Porsche 911 GT3 R, which, in contrast to the factory sport of the GTE class, is geared towards customer racing and is based on the one-make cup vehicle of the Carrera and Supercup.

The motorsport cars are built together with all other motorsport cars from Porsche in the manufactory of the Motorsport Center in Weissach.

== Porsche 996 GT3 R/RS/RSR ==
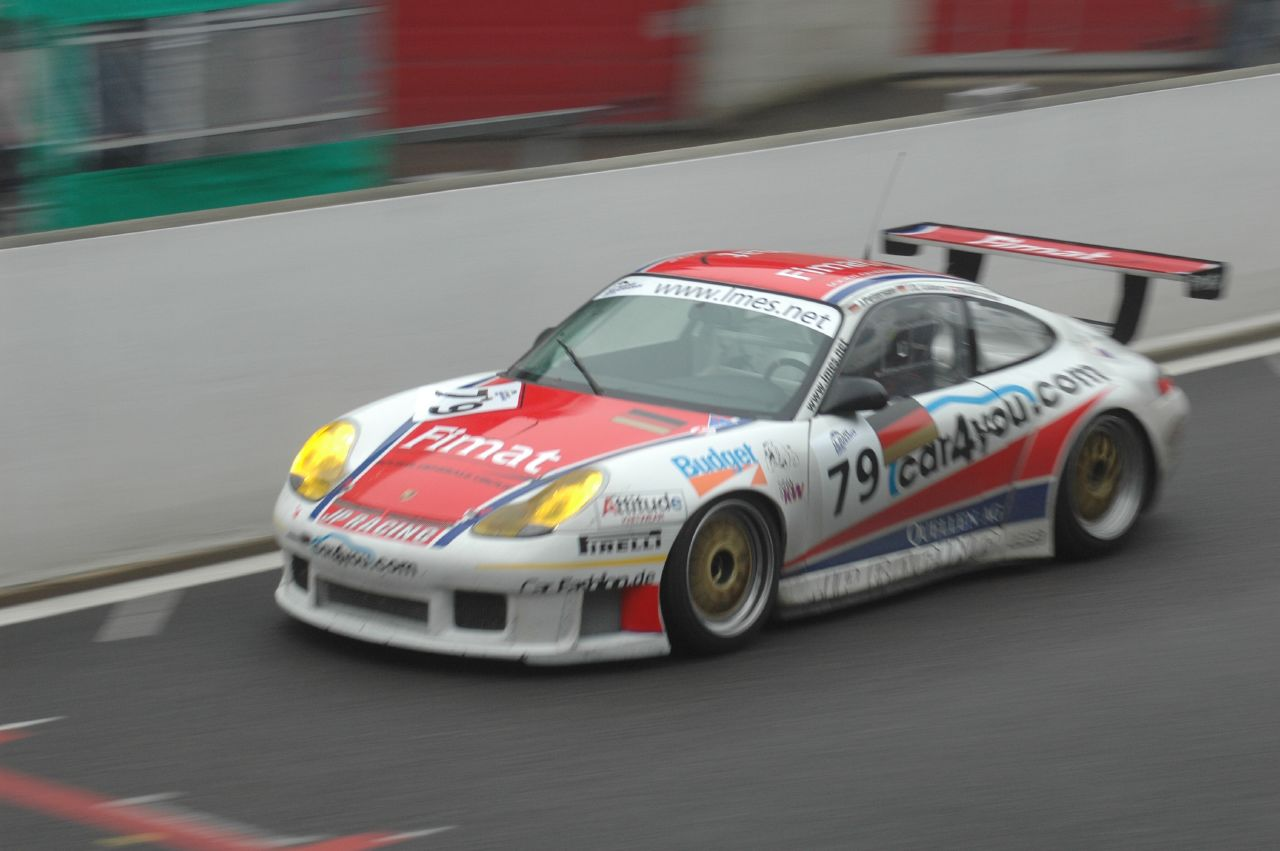
Porsche 996 GT3 RS

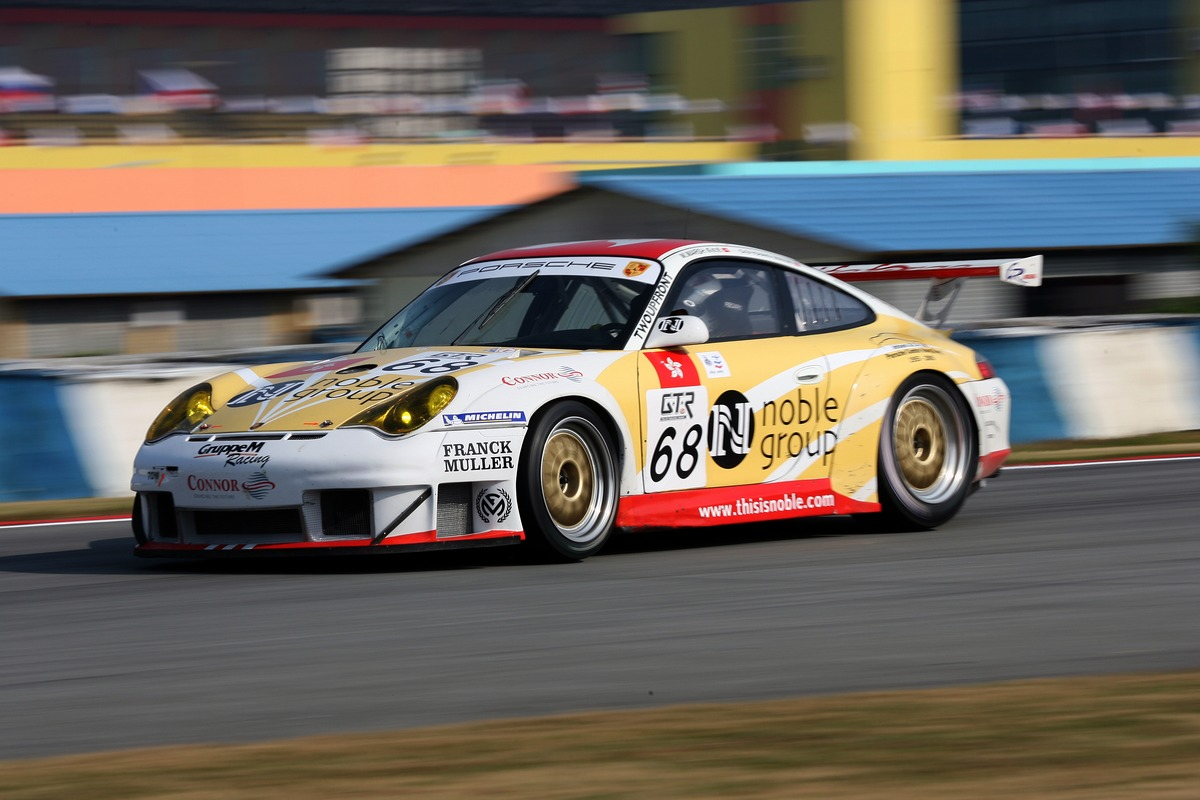
Porsche 996 GT3 RSR

Based on the Porsche 996 GT3, the racing version known as the 996 GT3 R was created in 1999.

The 996 GT3 R made its debut at the 1999 24 Hours of Le Mans. The Manthey-Racing and Champion Racing teams fielded the new racing car as unofficial representatives of the plant. The Manthey-Porsche of Uwe Alzen, Patrick Huisman and Luca Riccitelli won the class ahead of the Champion-Porsche of Dirk Müller, Bob Wollek and Bernd Mayländer.

The 996 GT3 R then took part in the American Le Mans Series and from 1999 to 2001 was also able to achieve almost all class wins in the "small" GT racing car class.

In the 2000 FIA GT Championship, the 996 GT3 R was the dominant vehicle in the new N-GT class and won every run. In the same year, the factory-supported Phoenix Racing won the 24-hour race at the Nürburgring.

In 2001, the modified version, now called the 996 GT3 RS, was used. The vehicle was not only very successful in its class, it also achieved overall victories. Jörg Bergmeister and Timo Bernhard prevailed against the much more powerful prototypes in the 2003 24-hour race in Daytona. In 2003, Stéphane Ortelli, Marc Lieb and Romain Dumas won the Spa-Francorchamps 24-hour race for the first time in the history of the FIA GT Championship in an NGT vehicle.

The successor model 996 GT3 RSR, which can be recognized by its teardrop-shaped headlights, made its debut in 2004. The engine output rose from 415 to 455 hp. In addition, the vehicle received a sequential six-speed gearbox.

By 2006, the racing versions of the Porsche 996 GT3 had achieved seven class wins in the 24 Hours of Le Mans as well as five class wins and one overall victory in the Spa 24 Hours. Almost 200 racing cars of this type were produced.

== Porsche 997 GT3 RSR ==
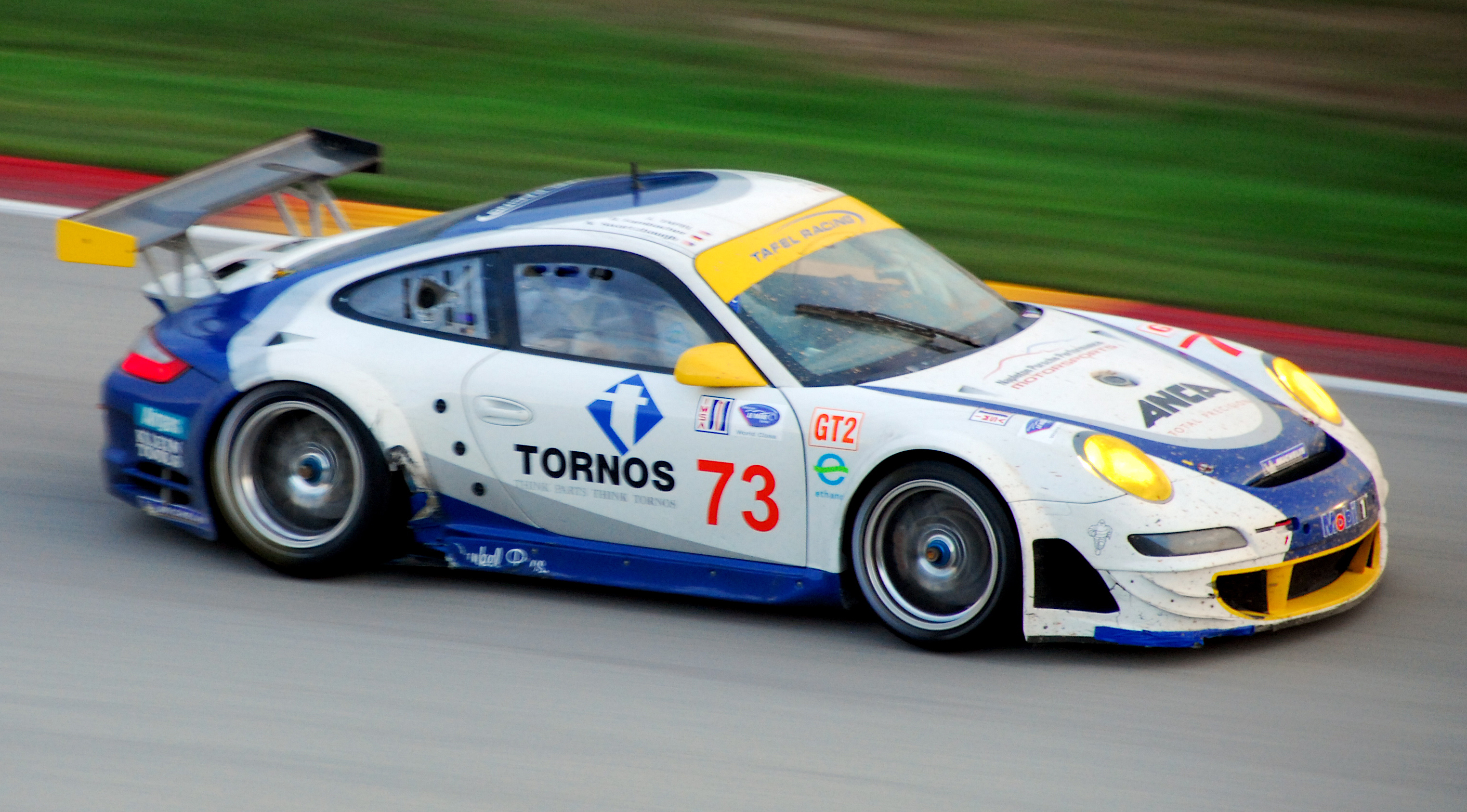
Porsche 997 GT3 RSR

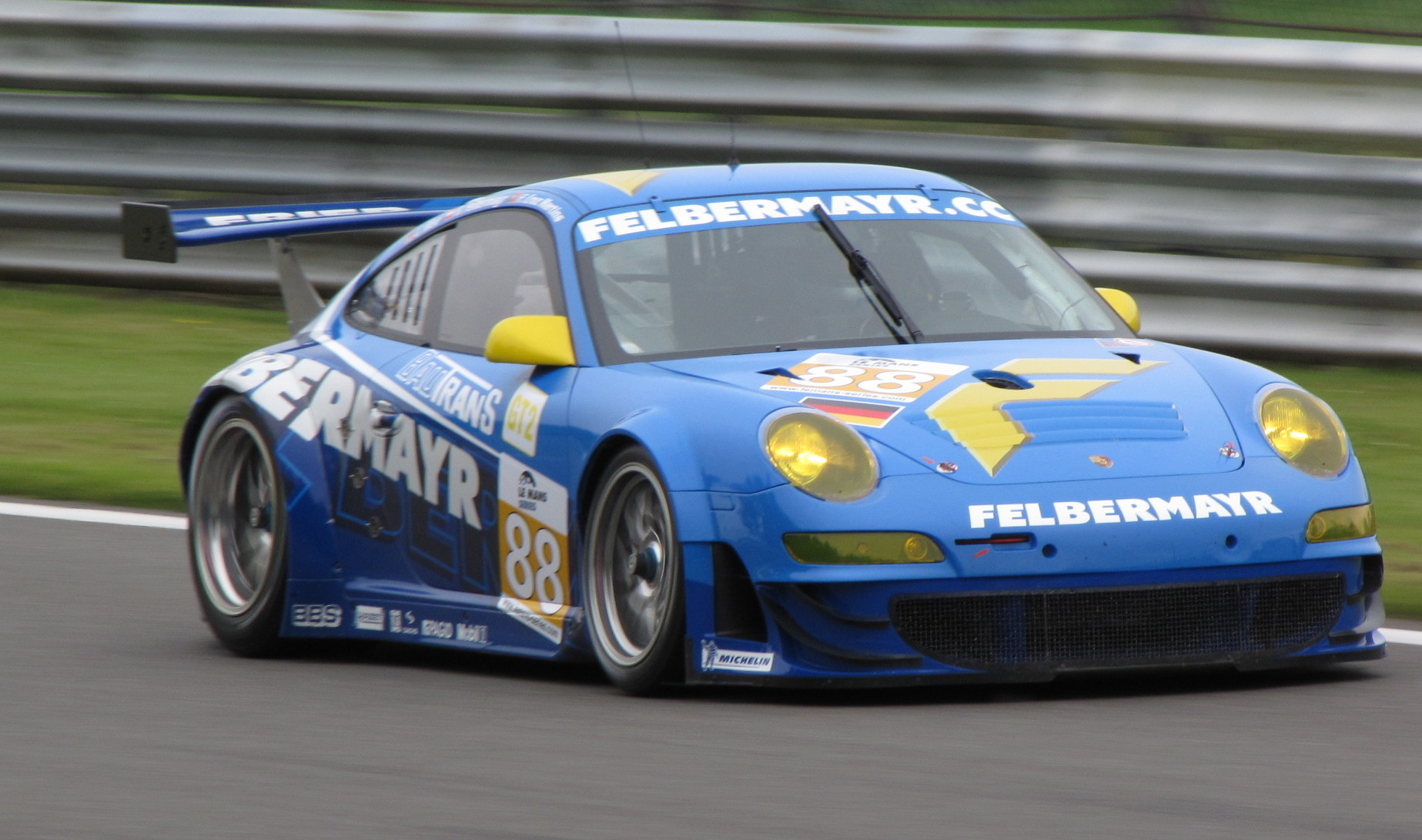
RSR at the 2009 1000 km of Spa with revised cooling air opening

The 997 GT3 RSR made its debut at the 2007 24 Hours of Le Mans. It had a displacement increased to 3.8 liters and an engine output of 342 kW (465 hp).

When the 997 GT3 RSR was first used, Manthey Racing was again the team under whose direction the vehicles were used. The vehicles finished 14th and 15th in the 2006 Spa-Francorchamps 24-hour race. From 2007, the 997 GT3 RSR was offered to customers (35 units were produced over the winter) and then also in the other races of the FIA GT championship and racing series used. In 2007, 2008, 2009 and 2011, Manthey Racing won the Nürburgring 24-hour race with this vehicle.

For the 2009 season, the 997 GT3 RSR received a major overhaul. The vehicle can be recognized by the new front with large cooling air openings and ventilation ducts on the front hood. The aerodynamics have been improved and the displacement has been increased to four liters. The engine output fell to 331 kW (450 PS) due to the air flow limiter stipulated by the regulations. The rotation of the engine tops on 9,400 rpm. 20 copies of the vehicle were to be produced.

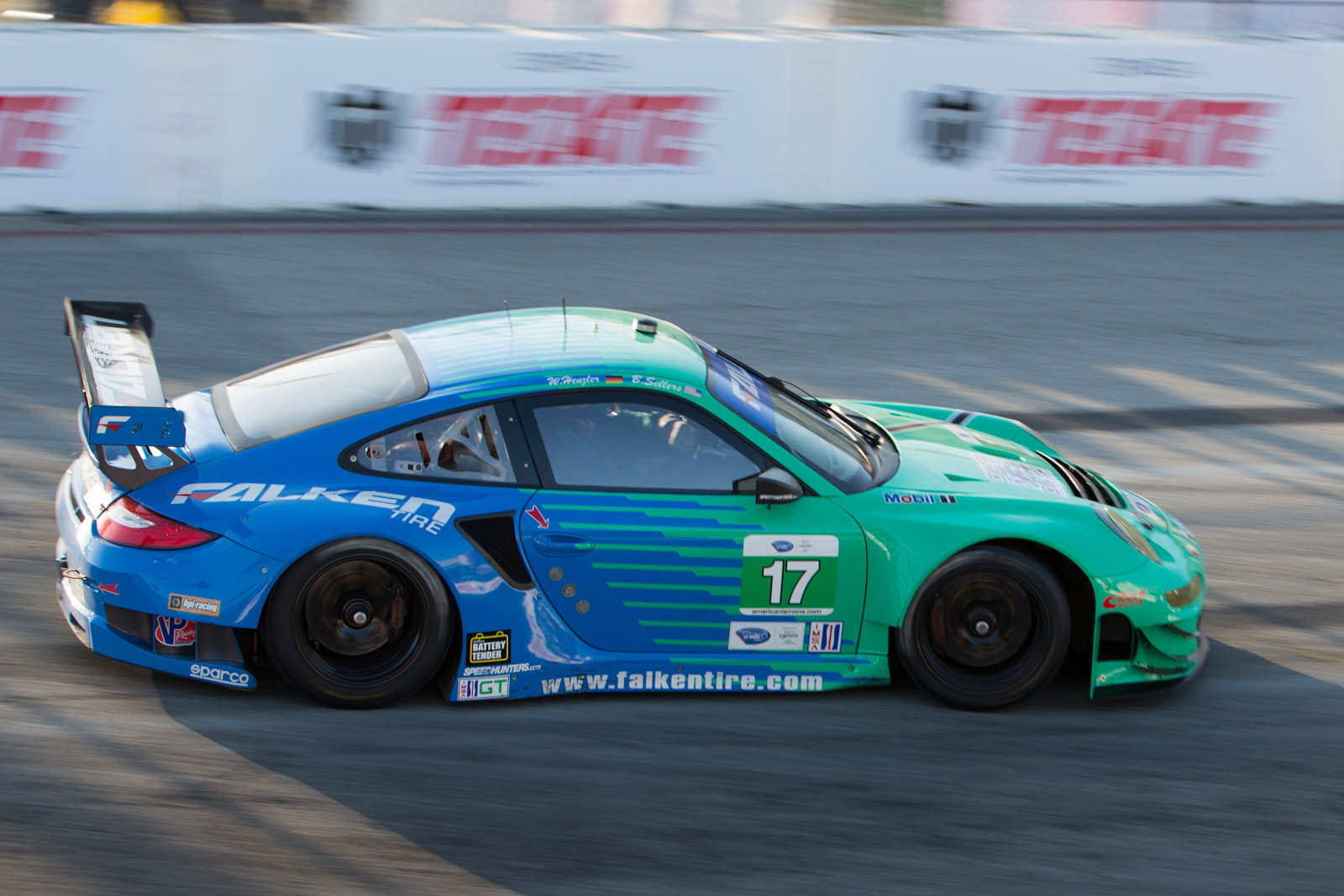
911 RSR in 2012 used by the Falken Team

The revised model was first used in racing at the 2009 12 Hours of Sebring. The qualification ended with a double pole position for the two factory-supported teams. In the race, the Porsche works drivers Jörg Bergmeister, Patrick Long and Marc Lieb narrowly missed the podium in the GT2 class after two collisions. Lieb and Lietz achieved their first class win at the 1000 km race in Barcelona in the Le Mans Series.

In November 2011, Porsche presented the final version of the 997 GT3 RSR. The 997 GT3 RSR had been delivered to customer teams around the world since January 2012. The sales price was 498,000 euros plus country-specific VAT. The body of the vehicle was widened by 48 mm and could accommodate 30 mm larger front wheels. In addition, the air flow had been changed. The car received additional air intakes in front of the rear fender. In return, the air scoop on the hood was removed. The cars were used in the 2012 FIA World Endurance Championship and the American Le Mans Series.

== Porsche 991 RSR ==
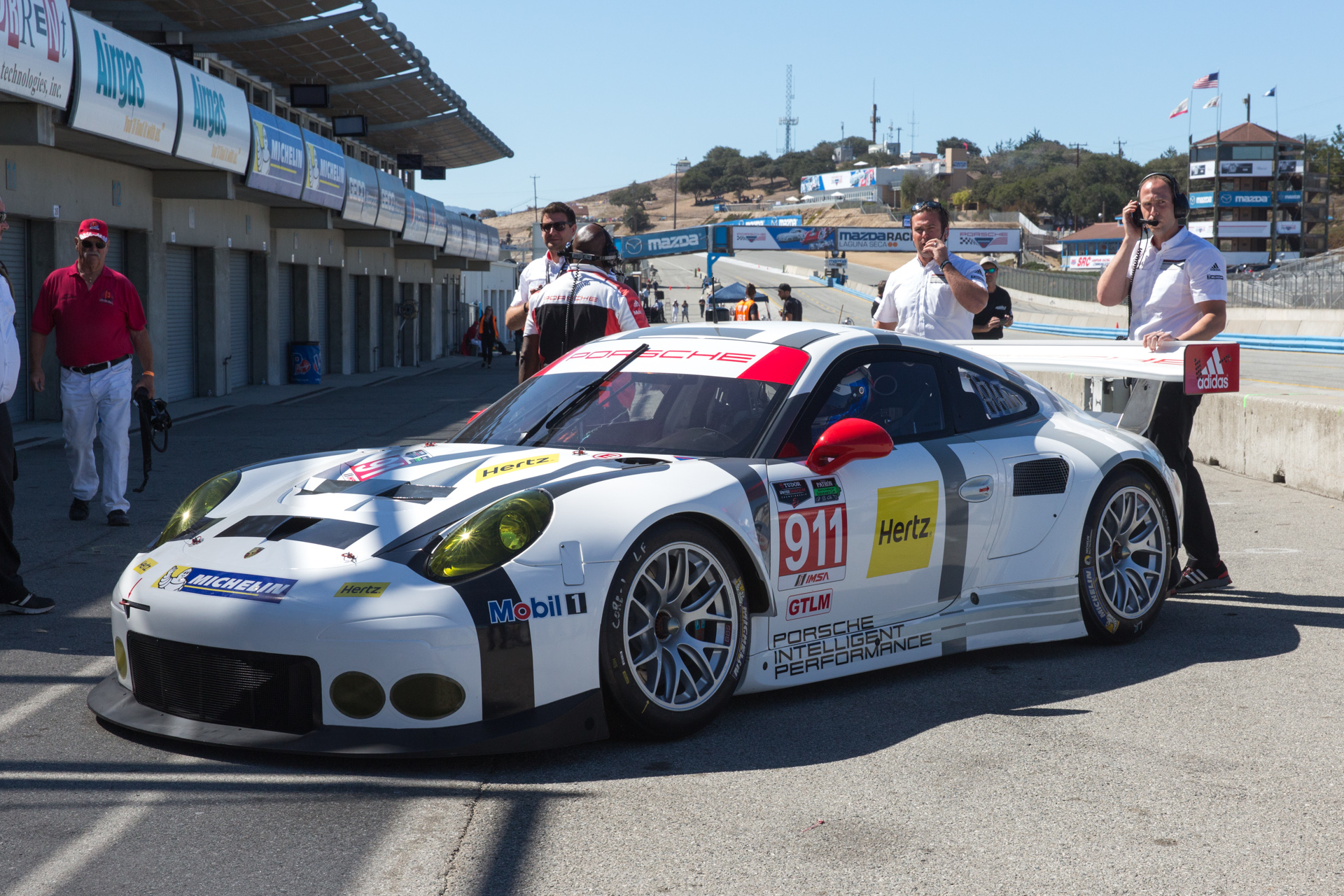
Front view of the 2015 Porsche 991 RSR

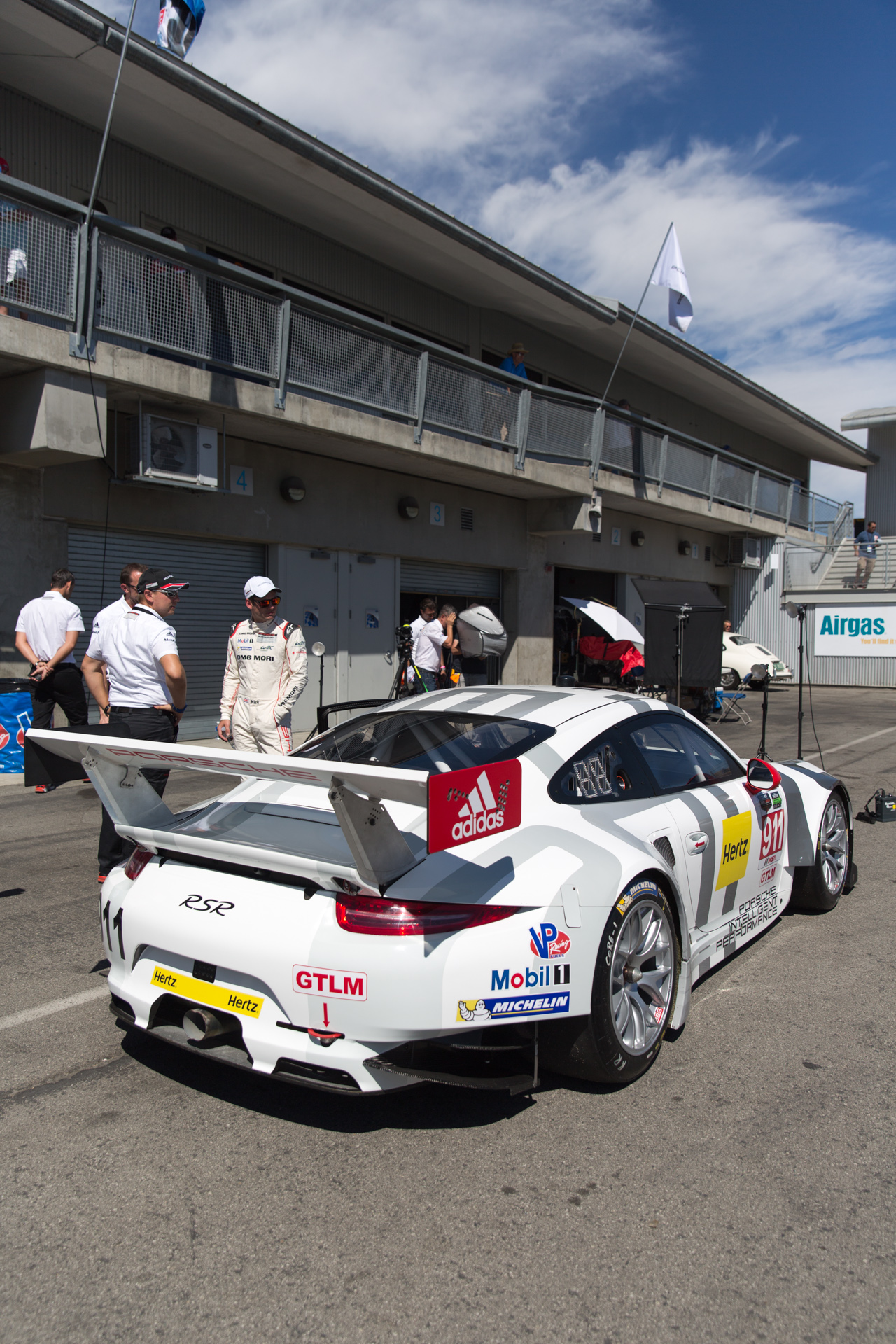
Rear view of the 2015 Porsche 991 RSR

The 991 RSR debuted in 2013 and for the first time was not based on the GT3 model of the 911, but on the Carrera 4S, as the street version of the GT3 was introduced too late for homologation. Thus, the name conflict with the racing car for the GT3 class could be avoided for the GTE model. Renaming it to GT2 RSR made little sense from a marketing point of view, as a turbo engine is installed in the GT2 series, while the 991 RSR continued to use the well-known 4.0-liter naturally aspirated M97/82 engine.

One of the focal points of development for the new 911 RSR was a more balanced weight distribution. Compared to the competitors with (front) mid-engined engines, in which all the heavy assemblies (engine, driver and tank) are arranged centrally, which reduces inertia around the vertical axis, the 911 is conceptually disadvantaged by its rear engine. Therefore, for packaging reasons, the tank was still installed at the front. However, this means that the fill level has a direct influence on the balance of the vehicle. In addition, the rear tires wear out more when the weight distribution is heavy at the rear. With components made of lightweight carbon fiber reinforced plastic: front and rear fenders, front and rear hood, doors, underbody, wheel arch linings, rear wing, dashboard and center console, an improved weight distribution should be achieved.

At the time, the GTE regulations allowed special technical permits (waivers) to be requested in order to compensate for objective concept disadvantages, such as those of the rear engine. The number of waivers was not actively communicated to the RSR. It was known that waivers were approved for the side air intakes, the vehicle width, the height of the underbody, the double wishbones at the front and the engine.

The vehicles continued to be used in the WEC by Manthey Racing, who had been promoted to Porsche works teams from 2013.

For the 2016 season, new GTE regulations came into force, which were intended to improve driver safety and increase the performance of the vehicles. This should set the GTE vehicles apart from the GT3 vehicles, which with less downforce but higher top speed were sometimes faster than the more complex GTE vehicles. This occurred particularly in the United SportsCar Championship, in which both GTE vehicles in the GTLM class and GT3 vehicles in the GTD class were eligible to compete. The performance of the GTE vehicles was achieved through an engine output that was around 20 hp higher and at the same time 15 kg less weight. The manufacturers were also given greater freedom in terms of aerodynamic design. The dimensions of the series vehicles no longer had to be adhered to so strictly. This meant that the vehicle-specific special permits (waivers) should be abolished. In terms of the balance of performance, the vehicles should continue to be on a similar level.

At Porsche, the existing 911 RSR was first adapted to the new rules in 2016. The rear wing was mounted higher and further back. However, this vehicle was unable to fully exploit the freedom of the new regulations, which is why it was inferior to the Ford GT and Ferrari 488 in the 2016 season.

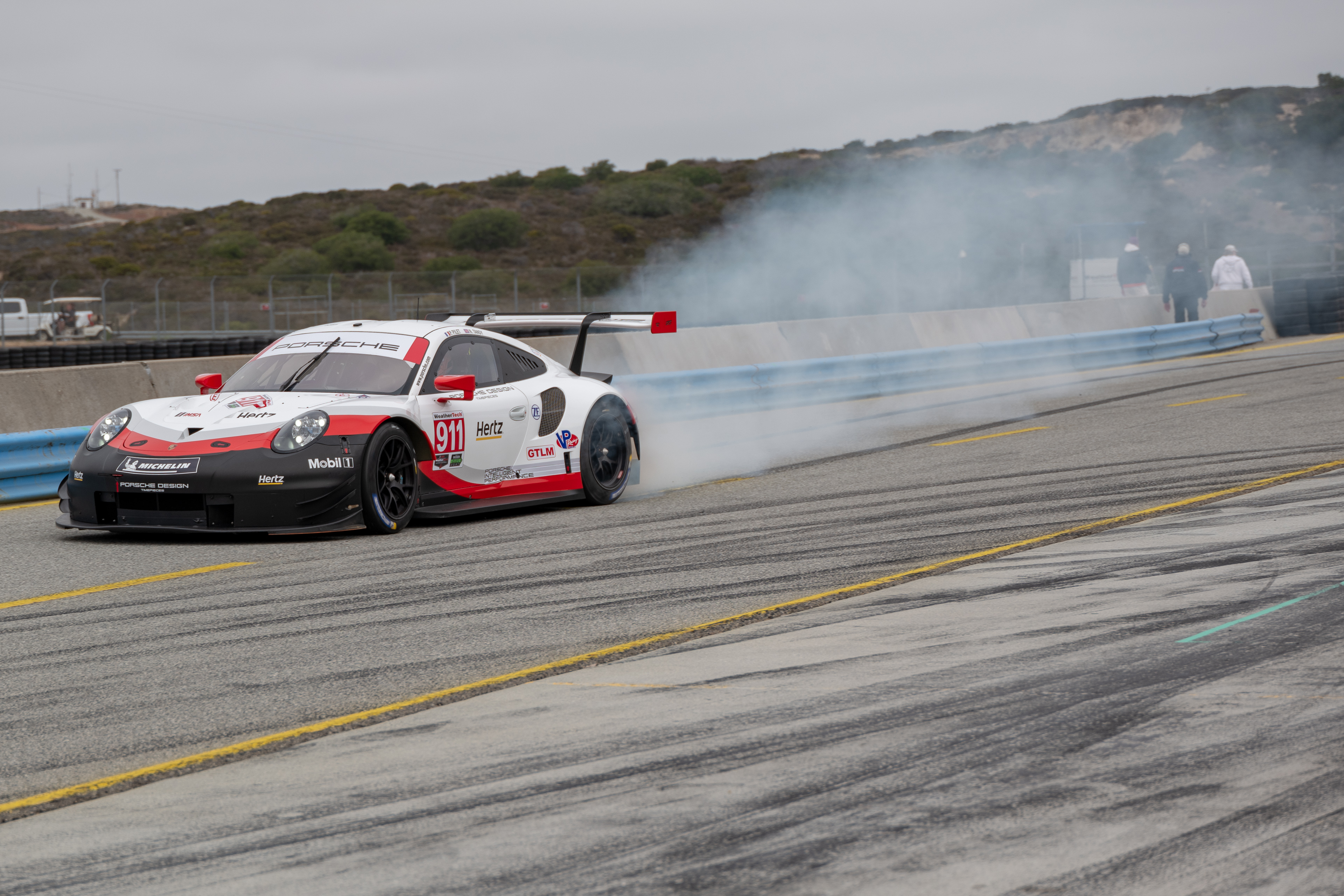
Porsche 911 RSR 2018

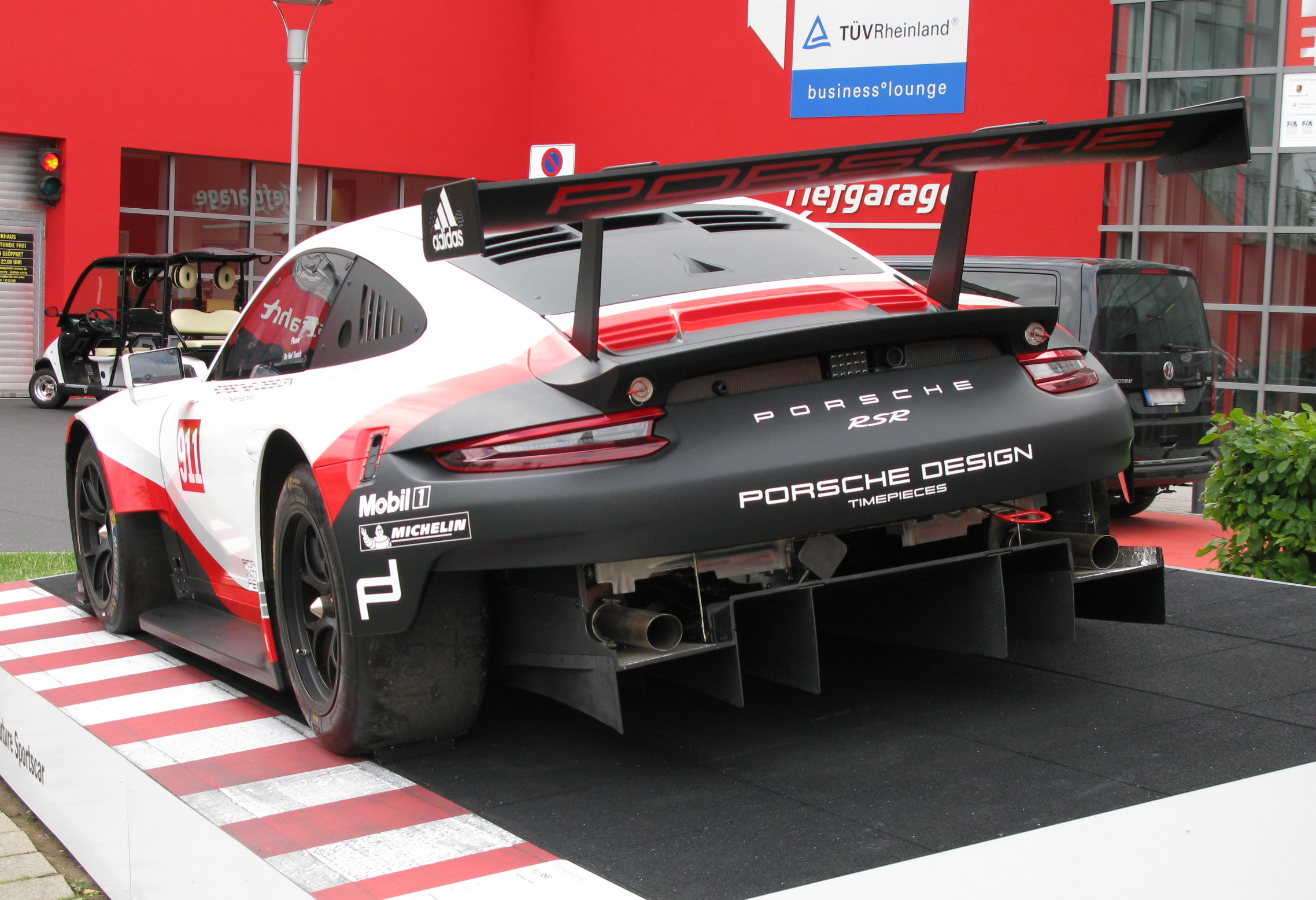
Porsche 911 RSR 2017 with new diffuser with originally planned separate exhaust system

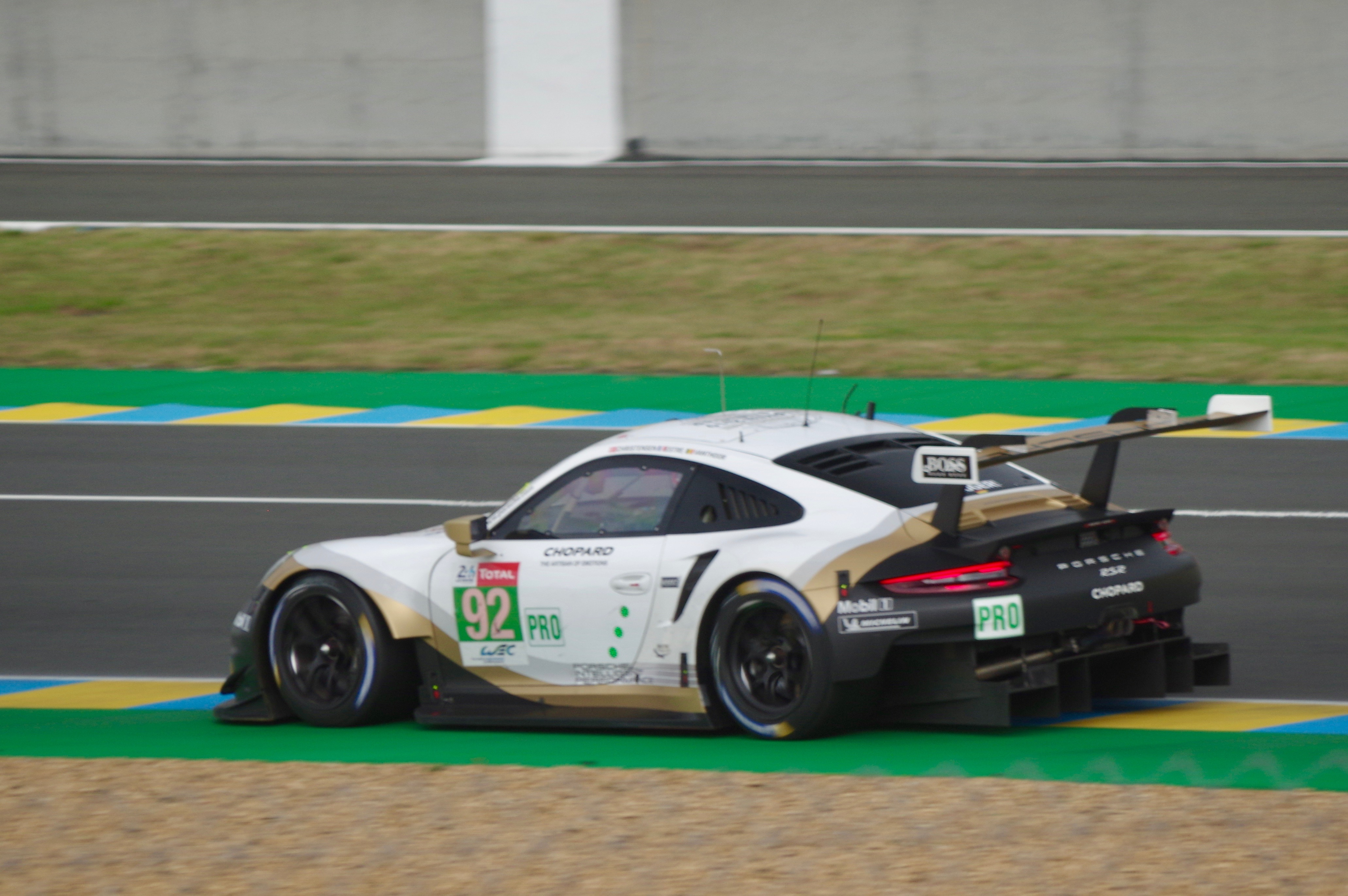
Porsche 911 RSR 2018/19

For the 2017 season, Porsche presented a newly developed 911 RSR. The chassis, body structure, aerodynamic concept, engine and transmission were completely redesigned. The engine-gearbox unit was reversed, transforming the 911 from a rear-engined and RWD to a mid-engined racing car. For traditional reasons, Porsche itself described the installation position as the engine in front of the rear axle, which the Porsche 911 GT1 already had. This enabled two decisive advantages to be gained: firstly, the weight distribution was improved, which benefits tire use, and secondly, there was space for the larger rear diffuser permitted in the new GTE regulations. Since the gearbox now installed in the rear was flatter than the engine, the rear diffuser could be wider and, above all, higher. To further improve the aerodynamic efficiency, the mounting of the rear wing was moved to the top of the rear wing blade in order to eliminate interfering contours and to improve the interaction between diffuser and rear wing.

The engine itself was also new. It was still a naturally aspirated engine based on the engine generation of the 911 GT3 R and 911 GT3 Cup with direct injection. Depending on the size of the restrictor, the 4.0-liter flat six-cylinder developed around 375 kW (510 hp). Contrary to the trend in the GTE class towards turbo engines, Porsche opted for the naturally aspirated engine due to the weight disadvantage of 15 kg-40 kg for turbo technology and the space and cooling requirements. Furthermore, the tank of the 991 RSR was installed in the front of the car and not in the center of the vehicle, as with thoroughbred mid-engine cars. A more pronounced balance shift depending on the level is therefore still given. Instead of the previous MacPherson struts with simple wishbones, a wheel suspension with double wishbones was used on the front axle. In addition, a new cockpit and a collision avoidance system were introduced, with which the faster prototypes can be recognized early on, on a monitor in the cockpit, even in the dark.

The Manthey Racing team achieved a double victory in the GTE Pro class at the 2018 24 Hours of Le Mans. The team also won the FIA World Endurance Championship in the 2018–19 season.

As part of the 2019 Goodwood Festival of Speed, Porsche presented another new development of the Porsche 911 RSR based on the 991.2, although production of the series model was discontinued at the end of 2019 and the first copies of the successor 992 were sold. The concept of the 2017 GTE model remained, but 95 percent were redeveloped to evolve the vehicle. Only components such as headlights, brakes, clutch, driver's seat and parts of the chassis were taken over from the predecessor unchanged. The main goal of the development was to improve the road holding in long, medium-fast corners. In addition, the exhaust system has been changed to two tailpipes that end at the side in front of the rear wheels. The exhaust solution of the 2017 model was only an emergency solution, as scraps of rubber collected on the exhaust of the original variant could ignite. The central rear protruding exhaust pipes, however, had the disadvantage that they could be damaged quickly in a duel. The design of the diffuser was also restricted by the central arrangement. The new exhaust gas routing has advantages in terms of weight, aerodynamics and vehicle contact on the racetrack. In addition, the naturally aspirated six-cylinder boxer engine was enlarged to 4.2 l displacement with almost the same output in order to improve torque development.

The 991.2 RSR had its racing premiere at the start of the winter season of the 2019–20 WEC season in the GTE Pro class, while the previous model was used in the IMSA WeatherTech SportsCar Championship until the end of the 2019 season.
