= Jörg Bergmeister =

German racing driver

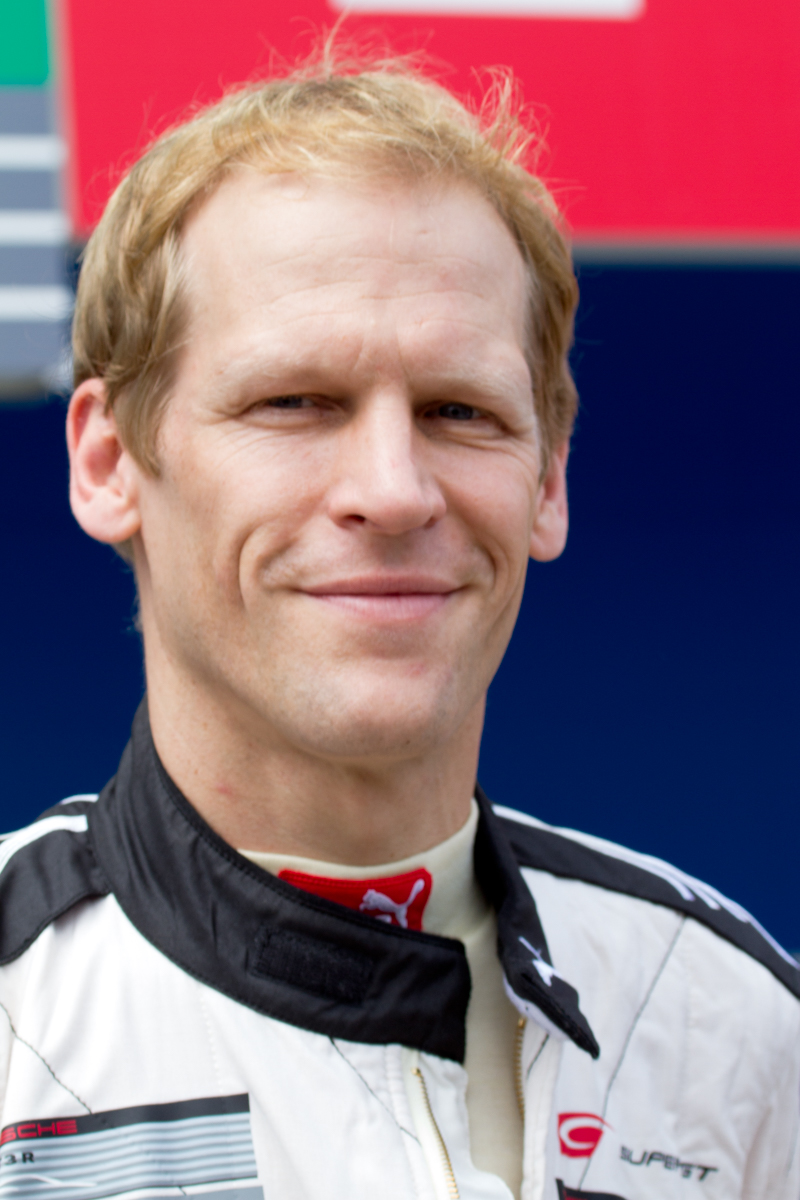
- Bergmeister at the 2014 Super GT Suzuka 1000km.
- Nationality: (Germany) German
- Born: 13 February 1976 (age 50) Leverkusen, West Germany
- Categorisation: FIA Platinum

24 Hours of Le Mans career
- Years: 2002–2019
- Teams: Freisinger Motorsport, The Racer's Group, White Lightning Racing, Petersen Motorsports, Flying Lizard Motorsports
- Best finish: 10th (2004, 2019)
- Class wins: 2 (2004, 2019)

Jörg Bergmeister (born 13 February 1976 in Leverkusen) is a German former racing driver and an ambassador of Porsche.

Since 1996, Bergmeister has raced in the Porsche Carrera Cup. In 2006 he won the Grand-American Rolex Series Championship. He also won the 2003 24 Hours of Daytona overall in a Porsche 911 GT3-RS. His most recent achievement is a win at the 24 Hours of Daytona in the GT Class with TRG.

Bergmeister also won the Porsche Supercup in 2001, and the German Cup in 2000. He is one of the tallest sport car drivers at 6'4". He also has a degree in economics. As of 2010, he drives for Flying Lizard Motorsports in the American Le Mans Series and the 24 Hours of Le Mans and BMS Scuderia Italia in the FIA GT2 European Championship.

His late father, Willi Bergmeister, owned a workshop and dealership where Michael Schumacher learned his trade as a car mechanic in the 1980s. His brother Tim, who won the ADAC GT Masters title in 2008, and nephew Jakob are also racing drivers.

== Career ==
=== Career summary ===
Season	Series	Team	Races	Wins	Poles	F/Laps	Podiums	Points	Position
2002	American Le Mans Series - GT	Alex Job Racing	10	1			6	186	4th
2003	American Le Mans Series - GT	Alex Job Racing	9	3			4	104	**3rd**
2004	American Le Mans Series - GT	Alex Job Racing	8	4			6	132	4th
2005	American Le Mans Series - GT2	Petersen Motorsports White Lightning Racing	10	5			9	179	**1st**
2006	American Le Mans Series - GT2	Petersen Motorsports White Lightning Racing	10	3			6	147	**1st**
2007	American Le Mans Series - GT2	Flying Lizard Motorsports	12	3			7	170	**3rd**
2008	American Le Mans Series - GT2	Flying Lizard Motorsports	11	4			9	187	**1st**
2009	American Le Mans Series - GT2	Flying Lizard Motorsports	10	6			6	181	**1st**
2010	American Le Mans Series - GT2	Flying Lizard Motorsports	9	4			5	157	**1st**
2011	American Le Mans Series - GT	Flying Lizard Motorsports	9	1			3	106	4th
2012	American Le Mans Series - GT	Flying Lizard Motorsports	10	1			4	111	5th
2013	FIA World Endurance Championship - GTE Pro	Porsche AG Team Manthey	8	0	0		5	99.5	6th
2014	United Sports Car Championship - GTLM	Porsche North America	4	1			1	107	18th
2014	FIA World Endurance Championship - GTE Pro	Porsche Team Manthey	8	0	0		3	99	6th
2015	United Sports Car Championship - GTLM	Porsche North America	10	0			5	276	6th
2015	FIA World Endurance Championship - GTE Pro	Porsche Team Manthey	1	0	0	0	0	12	18th
2016	IMSA SportsCar Championship - GTD	Park Place Motorsports	10	0	0		4	203	11th
2017	IMSA SportsCar Championship - GTD	Park Place Motorsports	11	1	0		4	275	10th
2018	IMSA SportsCar Championship - GTD	Park Place Motorsports	5	0	0	0	1	112	16th
2018-19	FIA World Endurance Championship - GTE Am	Team Project 1	8	2	0		6	151	1st
2019-20	FIA World Endurance Championship - GTE Am	Team Project 1	1	1			1	38	16th

- 2010 – 1st place ALMS GT Class Driver's Championship (Porsche 911 GT3-RSR)
- 2010 – 1st place 24 Hour of Spa (Porsche 911 GT3-RSR)
- 2009 – 1st place ALMS GT2 Class Driver's Championship (Porsche 911 GT3-RSR)
- 2009 – 1st place GT Class 24 Hours of Daytona
- 2008 – 1st place ALMS GT2 Class Driver's Championship (Porsche 911 GT3-RSR)
- 2006 – 1st place ALMS GT2 Class Driver's Championship (Porsche 911 GT3-RSR)
- 2006 – 1st place Grand-Am Daytona Prototype Driver's Championship
- 2005 – 1st place ALMS GT2 Class Driver's Championship (Porsche 911 GT3-RSR), 4th Place Daytona Prototype Grand-Am
- 2004 – 1st place GT Class 24 Hours of Le Mans
- 2003 – 3rd place ALMS GT Class (Porsche 911 GT3-RS), 1st place 24 Hours of Daytona Overall win
- 2002 – 4th place ALMS Class (Porsche 911 GT3-RS), 1st place GT Class 24 Hours of Daytona
- 2001 – 2nd place Porsche Carrera Cup, 1st place Porsche Supercup
- 2000 – 1st place Porsche Carrera Cup, 6th place Porsche Supercup
- 1999 – 3rd place Porsche Carrera Cup
- 1998 – 9th place Porsche Carrera Cup
- 1997 – 6th place Formula Opel Euroseries
- 1996 – 7th place Porsche Carrera Cup
- 1995 – 2nd place Formula Opel
- 1994 – Deutsche Formula Renault Masterseries
- 1993 – 1st place Formula König
- 1992 – 3rd place Formula König

=== American Le Mans Series results ===
(key) (Races in bold indicate pole position; results in italics indicate fastest lap)

Year	Team	Class	Make	Engine	1	2	3	4	5	6	7	8	9	10	11	12	Pos.	Points	Ref
2002	Alex Job Racing	GT	Porsche 911 GT3-RS	Porsche 3.6 L Flat-6	SEB; 9†	SON; 3	MID; 2	AME; 1	WAS; 3	TRO; 2	MOS; 6	MON; 7	MIA| 2	PET; Ret			4th	186	
2003	Alex Job Racing	GT	Porsche 911 GT3-RS	Porsche 3.6 L Flat-6	SEB; 5	ATL; 1	SON; 2	TRO; Ret	MOS; 1	ELK; 13	LAG; 9	MIA; 6†	PET; 1				3rd	104	
2004	Alex Job Racing	GT	Porsche 911 GT3-RSR	Porsche 3.6 L Flat-6	SEB	MDO; 2	LRP; 10	SON; 1	POR; 4	MOS; 1	ELK; 1	PET; 1	LAG; 2				4th	132	
2005	Petersen Motorsports White Lightning Racing	GT2	Porsche 911 GT3-RSR	Porsche 3.6 L Flat-6	SEB; 1	ATL; 3	MDO; 2	LRP; 2	SON; 2	POR; 8	ELK; 1	MOS; 1	PET; 1	LAG; 1			1st	179	
2006	Petersen Motorsports White Lightning Racing	GT2	Porsche 911 GT3-RSR	Porsche 3.6 L Flat-6	SEB; 7	HOU; 4	MDO; 7	LRP; 1	UTA; 2	POR; 2	ELK; 1	MOS; 6	PET; 1	LAG; 2			1st	147	
2007	Flying Lizard Motorsports	GT2	Porsche 911 GT3 RSR	Porsche 3.8 L Flat-6	SEB; 2	STP; 2	LBH; 9	HOU; 2	UTA; 2	LRP; 1	MDO; 1	ELK; 5	MOS; 5	DET; Ret	PET; 1	LAG; 4	3rd	170	
2008	Flying Lizard Motorsports	GT2	Porsche 911 GT3 RSR	Porsche 3.8 L Flat-6	SEB; 1	STP; 9	LBH; 2	UTA; 1	LRP; 1	MDO; 3	ELK; 2	MOS; 3	DET; 1	PET; 2	LAG; 10		1st	187	
2009	Flying Lizard Motorsports	GT2	Porsche 911 GT3 RSR	Porsche 4.0 L Flat-6	SEB; 4	STP; 1	LBH; 1	UTA; 1	LRP; 1	MDO; 1	ELK; 4	MOS; 5	PET; 5	LAG; 1			1st	181	
2010	Flying Lizard Motorsports	GT	Porsche 911 GT3 RSR	Porsche 4.0 L Flat-6	SEB; 4	LBH; 1	LAG; 1	UTA; 5	LRP; 1	MDO; 4	ELK; 2	MOS; 1	PET; 5				1st	157	
2011	Flying Lizard Motorsports	GT	Porsche 911 GT3 RSR	Porsche 4.0 L Flat-6	SEB; 6	LBH; DNF	LRP; 2	MOS; 13	MDO; 9	ELK; 4	BAL; 11	LAG; 1	PET; 2				4th	106	
2012	Flying Lizard Motorsports	GT	Porsche 911 GT3 RSR	Porsche 4.0 L Flat-6	SEB; 10	LBH; 7	LAG; 6	LRP; 1	MOS; DSQ	MDO; 2	ELK; 2	BAL; 5	VIR; 2	PET; 5			5th	111	

^{†} Did not finish the race but was classified as his car completed more than 70% of the overall winner's race distance.

=== 24 Hours of Le Mans results ===
Year	Team	Co-drivers	Car	Class	Laps	Pos.	Class pos.
2002	(Germany) Freisinger Motorsport	(France) Romain Dumas (Germany) Sascha Maassen	Porsche 911 GT3-RS	GT	321	17th	**2nd**
2003	(United States) The Racer's Group	(United States) Kevin Buckler (Germany) Timo Bernhard	Porsche 911 GT3-RS	GT	304	20th	5th
2004	(United States) White Lightning Racing	(United States) Patrick Long (Germany) Sascha Maassen	Porsche 911 GT3-RS	GT	327	10th	**1st**
2005	(United States) Petersen Motorsports (United States) White Lightning Racing	(United States) Patrick Long (Germany) Timo Bernhard	Porsche 911 GT3-RSR	GT2	331	11th	**2nd**
2006	(United States) White Lightning Racing (United States) Krohn Racing	(Sweden) Nic Jönsson (United States) Tracy Krohn	Porsche 911 GT3-RSR	GT2	148	DNF	DNF
2007	(United States) Flying Lizard Motorsports	(United States) Johannes van Overbeek (United States) Seth Neiman	Porsche 997 GT3-RSR	GT2	124	DNF	DNF
2008	(United States) Flying Lizard Motorsports	(United States) Johannes van Overbeek (United States) Seth Neiman	Porsche 997 GT3-RSR	GT2	289	32nd	6th
2009	(United States) Flying Lizard Motorsports	(United States) Darren Law (United States) Seth Neiman	Porsche 997 GT3-RSR	GT2	194	DNF	DNF
2010	(United States) Flying Lizard Motorsports	(United States) Seth Neiman (United States) Darren Law	Porsche 997 GT3-RSR	GT2	61	DNF	DNF
2011	(United States) Flying Lizard Motorsports	(Germany) Lucas Luhr (United States) Patrick Long	Porsche 997 GT3-RSR	GTE; Pro	310	18th	6th
2012	(United States) Flying Lizard Motorsports	(United States) Patrick Long (Germany) Marco Holzer	Porsche 997 GT3-RSR	GTE; Pro	114	DNF	DNF
2013	(Germany) Porsche AG Team Manthey	(France) Patrick Pilet (Germany) Timo Bernhard	Porsche 911 RSR	GTE; Pro	315	16th	**2nd**
2014	(Germany) Porsche Team Manthey	(France) Patrick Pilet (United Kingdom) Nick Tandy	Porsche 911 RSR	GTE; Pro	309	36th	7th
2015	(Germany) Porsche Team Manthey	(Austria) Richard Lietz (Denmark) Michael Christensen	Porsche 911 RSR	GTE; Pro	327	30th	5th
2016	(Germany) Porsche Motorsport	(New Zealand) Earl Bamber (France) Frédéric Makowiecki	Porsche 911 RSR	GTE; Pro	140	DNF	DNF
2018	(Germany) Team Project 1	(United States) Patrick Lindsey (Norway) Egidio Perfetti	Porsche 911 RSR	GTE; Am	332	34th	7th
2019	(Germany) Team Project 1	(United States) Patrick Lindsey (Norway) Egidio Perfetti	Porsche 911 RSR	GTE; Am	334	31st	**1st**

=== 24 Hours of Daytona results ===
Year	Team	Co-drivers	Car	Class	Laps	Pos.	Class pos.
2002	(United States) The Racer's Group	(United States) Kevin Buckler (United States) Michael Schrom (Germany) Timo Bernhard	Porsche 996 GT3-RS	GT	669	7th	**1st**
2003	(United States) The Racer's Group	(United States) Kevin Buckler (United States) Michael Schrom (Germany) Timo Bernhard	Porsche 996 GT3-RS	GT	695	1st	1st
2004	(United States) The Racer's Group/Monster Cable	(United States) Kevin Buckler (Germany) Timo Bernhard (United States) Patrick Long	Porsche 996 GT3-RS	GT	494	14th	5th
2005	(United States) Krohn Racing/The Racer's Group	(Italy) Max Papis (United Kingdom) Oliver Gavin	Riley Mk XI	DP	653	16th	10th
2006	(United States) Krohn Racing	(United States) Tracy Krohn (Sweden) Niclas Jönsson (United States) Colin Braun	Riley Mk XI	DP	717	5th	5th
2007	(United States) Ruby Tuesday Championship Racing	(France) Romain Dumas (United States) Patrick Long	Crawford DP03	DP	615	18th	12th
2008	(United States) Team Seattle/Farnbacher Loles Racing	(United States) Eric Lux (United States) Leh Keen (Germany) Sascha Maassen (Germany) Wolf Henzler	Porsche 997 GT3 Cup	GT	580	33rd	19th
2009	(United States) The Racer's Group	(United States) Justin Marks (United States) Andy Lally (United States) R. J. Valentine (United States) Patrick Long	Porsche 997 GT3 Cup	GT	695	9th	**1st**
2010	(United States) The Racer's Group/Flying Lizard Motorsports	(United States) Patrick Long (United States) Seth Neiman (United States) Johannes van Overbeek	Porsche 997 GT3 Cup	GT	703	9th	**2nd**
2011	(United States) Flying Lizard Motorsports	(United States) Patrick Long (United States) Seth Neiman (United States) Johannes van Overbeek	Riley Mk. XI	DP	654	22nd DNF	13th DNF
2012	(United States) Flying Lizard Motorsports with Wright Motorsports	(United States) Patrick Long (United States) Seth Neiman (Germany) Mike Rockenfeller	Porsche 997 GT3 Cup	GT	706	26th	15th
2013	(United States) The Racer's Group	(Germany) Dominik Farnbacher (United States) Ben Keating (Canada) Kuno Wittmer	Porsche 911 GT3 Cup	GT	622	31st	20th
2014	(United States) Porsche North America	(United States) Patrick Long (Denmark) Michael Christensen	Porsche 911 RSR	GTLM	489	54th DNF	9th DNF
2015	(United States) Porsche North America	(New Zealand) Earl Bamber (France) Frédéric Makowiecki (Denmark) Michael Christensen	Porsche 911 RSR	GTLM	581	31st DNF	7th DNF
2016	(United States) Park Place Motorsports	(United States) Patrick Lindsey (United States) Matt McMurry (Austria) Norbert Siedler	Porsche 911 GT3 R	GTD	524	41st	17th
2017	(United States) Park Place Motorsports	(United States) Patrick Lindsey (United States) Matt McMurry (Austria) Norbert Siedler	Porsche 911 GT3 R	GTD	102	51st DNF	24th DNF
2018	(United States) Park Place Motorsports	(United States) Patrick Lindsey (United States) Tim Pappas (Austria) Norbert Siedler	Porsche 911 GT3 R	GTD	675	40th	18th

=== Complete FIA World Endurance Championship results ===
(key) (Races in bold indicate pole position; races in italics indicate fastest lap)

Year	Entrant	Class	Car	Engine	1	2	3	4	5	6	7	8	Rank	Points
2013	Porsche AG Team Manthey	LMGTE Pro	Porsche 911 RSR	Porsche 4.0 L Flat-6	SIL; 7	SPA; Ret	LMS; 2	SÃO; 3	COA; 9	FUJ; 3	SHA; 3	BHR; 2	6th	99.5
2014	Porsche Team Manthey	LMGTE Pro	Porsche 911 RSR	Porsche 4.0 L Flat-6	SIL; 2	SPA; 2	LMS; 11	COA; 4	FUJ; 4	SHA; 2	BHR; 4	SÃO; 6	6th	99
2015	Porsche Team Manthey	LMGTE Pro	Porsche 911 RSR	Porsche 4.0 L Flat-6	SIL	SPA	LMS; 7	NÜR	COA	FUJ	SHA	BHR	18th	12
2018–19	Team Project 1	LMGTE Am	Porsche 911 RSR	Porsche 4.0L Flat-6	SPA; 9	LMS; 3	**SIL**; 3	FUJ; 1	SHA; 2	SEB; 3	SPA; 5	LMS; 1	1st	151
2019–20	Team Project 1	LMGTE Am	Porsche 911 RSR	Porsche 4.0L Flat-6	SIL	FUJ	SHA	BHR	COA	SPA	LMS	BHR; 1	16th	38

=== IMSA SportsCar Championship results ===
(key) (Races in bold indicate pole position; results in italics indicate fastest lap)

Year	Team	Car	Engine	Class	1	2	3	4	5	6	7	8	9	10	11	12	Rank	Points	Ref
2014	Porsche North America	Porsche 911 RSR	Porsche 4.0 L Flat-6	GTLM	DAY; 9	SEB; 1	LBH	LAG	WGI	MOS	IMS	ELK	VIR	COA; 11	**PET**; 5		18th	107	
2015	Porsche North America	Porsche 911 RSR	Porsche 4.0 L Flat-6	GTLM	DAY; 7	SEB; 7	LBH; 8	LGA; 3	WGL; 2	MOS; 7	ELK; 2	VIR; 2	AUS; 5	PET; 8			6th	276	
2016	Park Place Motorsports	Porsche 911 GT3 R	Porsche 4.0L Flat-6	GTD	DAY; 17	SEB; 17	LGA; 11	BEL; 2	WGL; 8	MOS; 6	LIM; 10	ELK; 2	VIR	AUS; 5	PET; 12		11th	203	
2017	Park Place Motorsports	Porsche 911 GT3 R	Porsche 4.0L Flat-6	GTD	DAY; 24	SEB; 6	LBH; 4	AUS; 8	BEL; 9	WGL	MOS; 9	LIM; 1	ELK; 2	VIR; 10	LGA; 3	PET; 3	10th	275	
2018	Park Place Motorsports	Porsche 911 GT3 R	Porsche 4.0L Flat-6	GTD	DAY; 18	SEB; 9	MOH	BEL	WGL; 6	MOS	LIM	ELK; 11	VIR	LGA; 2	PET		16th	112	

Sporting positions
Preceded by Lucas Luhr	Porsche Carrera Cup Germany champion 2000	Succeeded by Timo Bernhard
Preceded by Patrick Huisman	Porsche Supercup champion 2001	Succeeded by Stéphane Ortelli
Preceded by Max Angelelli; Wayne Taylor	Rolex Sports Car Series; DP Champion; 2006	Succeeded by Alex Gurney; Jon Fogarty
Preceded by Pedro Lamy; Mathias Lauda; Paul Dalla Lana	FIA Endurance Trophy for LMGTE Am Drivers; 2018–19; With: Patrick Lindsey & Egidio Perfetti	Succeeded by Emmanuel Collard; François Perrodo; Nicklas Nielsen
