= Michael Schrom =

American racing driver

Michael Schrom is an American racing driver from Ghent, New York.

Schrom was a full-time competitor in Porsche Carrera Cup series who also drove a Porsche 911 in the 24 Hours of Daytona in 2000, 2001, 2002, and 2003. In 2003, The Racer's Group Porsche driven by Schrom, team owner Kevin Buckler, Timo Bernhard, and Jörg Bergmeister was the surprise overall winner of the race. In 2002, Schrom and Buckler were honored as the two most successful private Porsche racing drivers in the world for finishing first and second in the Porsche Carrera Cup.

Schrom is also owner of Michael Schrom and Company. He has shot over 1600 television commercials for a diverse, wide-ranging client roster which includes, but not exclusively, such prominent companies as Wendy's International, Carlson Food Group (owner of the T.G. I. Friday's restaurant chain), McDonald's, Maybelline, Stouffers, L'Oreal, and Lean Cuisine. Schrom has a Bachelor of Fine Arts Degree in Film from The Tisch School of the Arts at New York University.
