= Kevin Buckler =

American racing driver

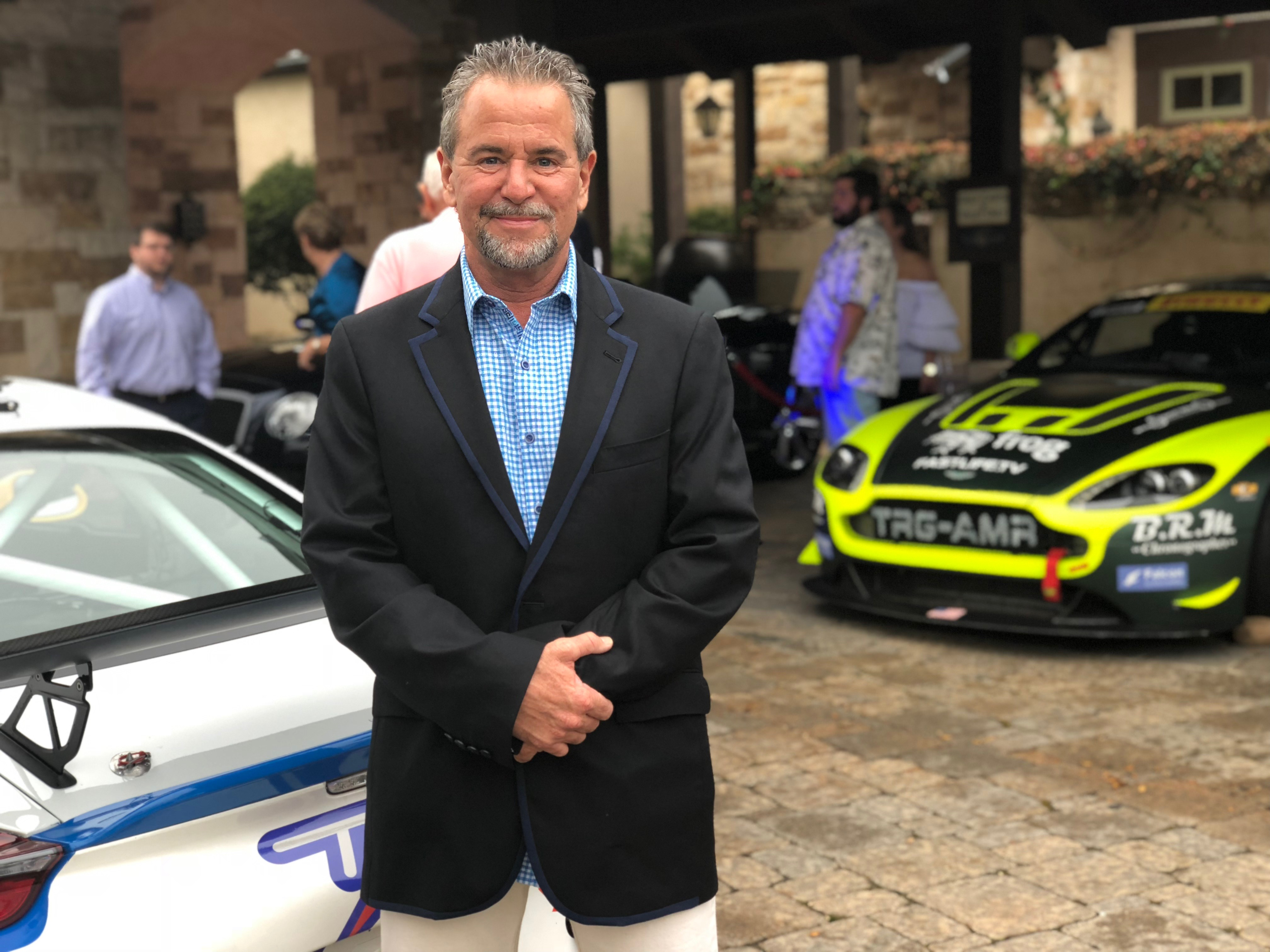
- Buckler at an event, 2018
- Born: February 9, 1959 (age 67); Coral Gables, Florida, U.S.
- Occupations: Race car driver, entrepreneur
- Known for: The Racers Group, Adobe Road Winery
- Spouse: Debra Buckler

24 Hours of Le Mans career
- Years: 2002–2003
- Teams: The Racer's Group
- Best finish: 1st in LMGT (2002)
- Class wins: 1 (2002)

Kevin Buckler (born February 9, 1959) is an American race car driver and entrepreneur. He founded Adobe Road Winery and currently owns The Racer's Group, a professional sports car racing team; TRG Motorsports, formerly a NASCAR Sprint Cup Series team; and TRG-Aston Martin Racing. In 2019, Buckler launched a $56 racing-themed wine named SHIFT through his winery Adobe Road.

== History ==
Buckler was born in Coral Gables, FL and he grew up in Newport Beach, CA.

Buckler began racing at the local level in the late 1980s. He attended his first high-speed race in 1990. In 1992, Buckler and his wife Debra created The Racer's Group (TRG) as a Porsche Club Racing business. 1995 saw Buckler take his first start as a professional driver. Off the track the same year, Buckler and his wife, along with friends, opened Adobe Road Winery in Sonoma County, California.

In 2002, TRG with support from Porsche Factory, won the GT class at the Rolex 24 At Daytona and the 24 Hours of Le Mans. Buckler would lead TRG to three more GT class wins in the Rolex 24 at Daytona, including an overall first place in 2003. TRG holds the record for the team with the most Rolex Sports Car Series GT victories at 29, and is ranked third for the most GT pole positions with 15. Buckler was the 2002 recipient of the Porsche Cup.

In 2009, Buckler would expand his racing horizons into the NASCAR Cup Series with the formation of TRG Motorsports. TRG Motorsports would go on to take 106 starts in the Sprint Cup Series with two top-ten finishes and six starts in the Camping World Truck Series, taking six starts with two top-ten finishes and one top-five finish.

In 2012, TRG Motorsports announced it would not continue competing in the NASCAR Cup Series, but would focus on Grand-Am.

Adobe Road wines has 15 wines receiving Wine Spectator scores of 90 and above, including the 2008 Cabernet Sauvignon, Napa Valley, Beckstoffer Georges III which received a score of 94 out of 100.

== 24 Hours of Le Mans results ==
Year	Team	Co-Drivers	Car	Class	Laps	Pos.	Class Pos.
2002	(United States) The Racer's Group	(Germany) Lucas Luhr (Germany) Timo Bernhard	Porsche 911 GT3-RS	GT	322	16th	1st
2003	(United States) The Racer's Group	(Germany) Jörg Bergmeister (Germany) Timo Bernhard	Porsche 911 GT3-RS	GT	304	20th	5th

== 24 Hours of Daytona results ==
Year	Team	Co-drivers	Car	Class	Laps	Pos.	Class pos.
2002	(United States) The Racer's Group	(Germany) Jörg Bergmeister (United States) Michael Schrom (Germany) Timo Bernhard	Porsche 996 GT3-RS	GT	669	7th	1st
2003	(United States) The Racer's Group	(Germany) Jörg Bergmeister (United States) Michael Schrom (Germany) Timo Bernhard	Porsche 996 GT3-RS	GT	695	1st	1st

== See also ==
- List of celebrities who own wineries and vineyards
