= Timo Bernhard =

German racing driver (born 1981)

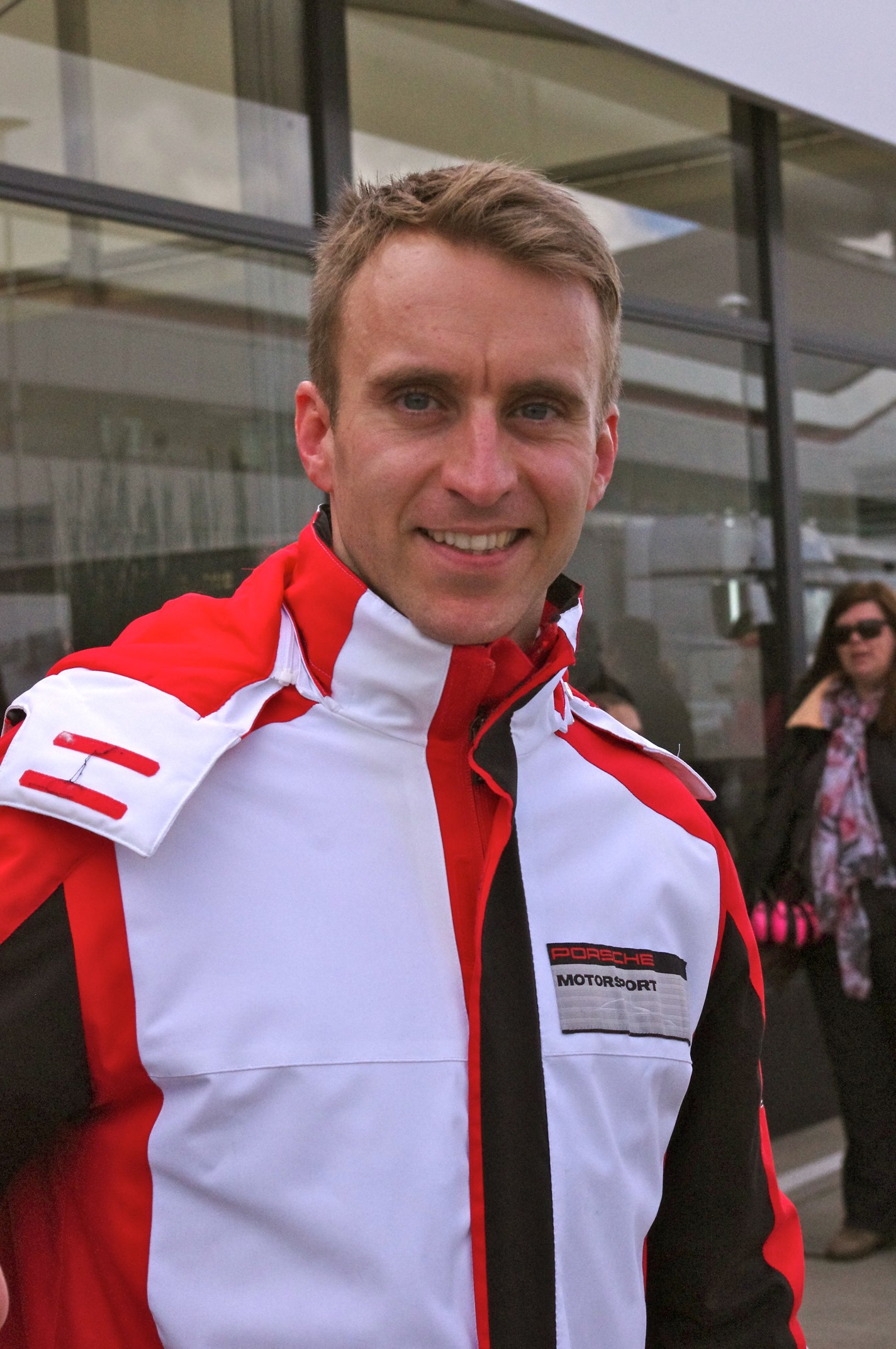
- Bernhard in 2014
- Nationality: (Germany) German
- Born: 24 February 1981 (age 45) Homburg, West Germany
- Categorisation: FIA Platinum (until 2026); FIA Gold (2027–)
24 Hours of Le Mans career
- Years: 2002–2003, 2005, 2009–2011, 2013–2018
- Teams: Porsche LMP Team #2 Porsche GT Team #94; The Racer's Group; Peterson Motorsports/White Lightning Racing; Audi Sport Team Joest
- Best finish: 1st (2010, 2017)
- Class wins: 3 (2002, 2010, 2017)

Timo Bernhard (born 24 February 1981) is a German former racing driver. He was a long-term sports car driver for Porsche, but was seconded to Audi for selected events in 2009 and 2010. He is the ninth driver to complete the informal triple crown of endurance racing, having won the 24 Hours of Daytona in 2003, the 12 Hours of Sebring in 2008, and the 24 Hours of Le Mans in 2010 for Audi and 2017 for Porsche. He also holds the joint record for most all-time Nürburgring 24 Hours wins with five.

On 29 June 2018, Bernhard became the first person in 35 years to break the all-time Nürburgring Nordschleife lap record, set by Stefan Bellof in 1983 with a Porsche 956, in a derestricted Porsche 919 Evo with a time of 5:19.546.

== Early career ==
Bernhard was born in Homburg, Saarland. He debuted in karting in 1991. He finished fifth at the CIK/FIA Junior World Championship and was crowned German junior champion. The next two years, Bernhard was sixth and third at the German Karting Championship. In 1998, he moved to formula cars as he joined Formula Ford, finishing sixth in both the German series and the Eurocup in 1998. In his last year in open-wheelers, 1999, Bernhard finished third in the German Formula Ford.

== Sports cars ==
For 2000, Bernhard drove in Porsche Supercup as a UPS Porsche Junior driver, finishing third in the championship. In 2001, he made his American Le Mans Series debut at the 12 Hours of Sebring, where he finished second in the GT class with Randy Pobst and Christian Menzel, driving for Alex Job Racing. He also made four other ALMS starts, and won the Porsche Carrera Cup championship.

=== 2002 ===
In 2002, Bernhard began the season with a class win in the 24 Hours of Daytona for The Racer's Group. He then finished second overall at the 24 Hours Nürburgring driving for Alzen Motorsport. The crowning achievement of the year was winning the GT class at the 24 Hours of Le Mans, with Kevin Buckler and Lucas Luhr. He also finished third in the Carrera Cup, and won his first ALMS race (with Jörg Bergmeister) and finished fourth in the championship.

=== 2003 ===
Bernhard began the season by winning the 24 Hours of Daytona outright in a Porsche 911 GT3-RS, driving with Buckler, Michael Schrom, and Bergmeister. Bernhard and Bergmeister won three ALMS races, including Petit Le Mans, and finished second in the championship. He also finished third at the Nürburgring 24 Hours.

=== 2004 ===
In 2004, Bernhard again partnered with Jörg Bergmeister in the ALMS. The duo took six wins from nine starts and won the GT class driver's championship. Their successes included class wins at Sebring and Petit Le Mans, both time joined by Sascha Maassen. Bernhard also finished fourth overall and second in class in the Spa 24 Hours. He finished on the podium at the Nürburgring 24 Hours for the third straight year, finishing in third in a Manthey Racing Porsche.

=== 2005 ===
Bernhard joined Romain Dumas in the ALMS for 2005. They scored four class wins, and Bernhard won four poles, but finished second in the championship. Dumas also finished second in the GT2 class at the 24 Hours of Le Mans, driving with Jörg Bergmeister and Patrick Long.

=== 2006 ===
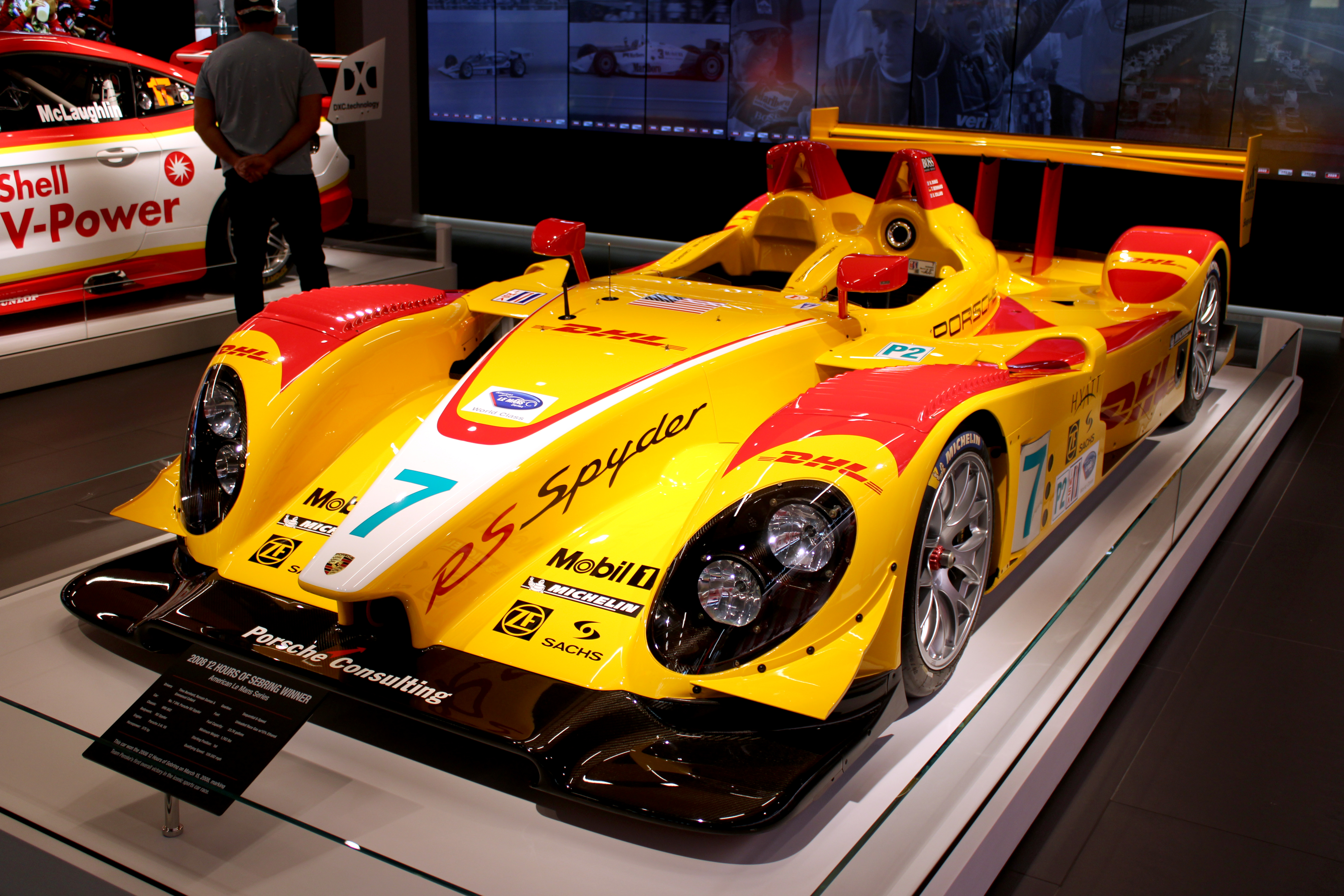
Timo Bernhard's 2008 Porsche RS Spyder on display at the Indianapolis Motor Speedway Museum

In 2006, Bernhard moved to Penske Racing who owned and captained by legendary owner Roger Penske and the new Porsche RS Spyder in the LMP2 class of the ALMS, again partnering Dumas. After a frustrating start to the season, Bernhard and Dumas took advantage of the Audi R10's absence from the series to take the overall win at Mid-Ohio. This was the first overall win for an LMP2 class car, and the first win for an under-class car since 2003. Bernhard also won the LMP2 class at Petit Le Mans (with Sascha Maassen and Emmanuel Collard), and took four class victories in total and finished third in the championship. He also won the 24 Hours Nürburgring outright, partnering Lucas Luhr, Marcel Tiemann, and Mike Rockenfeller.

=== 2009 ===
Bernhard and Dumas moved to Joest Racing, in which he ran the new Audi R15 TDI. Along with Alexandre Prémat, the No. 3 car finished 17th in the 2009 24 Hours of Le Mans.

=== 2010 ===
Along with Dumas and Rockenfeller, Bernhard took the overall win in the 2010 24 Hours of Le Mans. This was the first win for either driver and set records throughout and after the race, including breaking the 1971 distance record of 5,335.313 km (3,315.210 mi); the car (No. 9) ran 397 laps and 5,410.713 km (3,362.061 mi). Bernhard's victory made him the eleventh driver to complete the Triple Crown in endurance racing, with Bernhard also winning not only the 2003 24 Hours of Daytona but also the 2008 12 Hours of Sebring with Penske (also with Dumas but also with Collard). Bernhard partnered Klaus Graf in the Muscle Milk Team CytoSport Porsche RS Spyder to second place at Road America, the seventh round of the 2010 ALMS season.

== Racing achievements ==
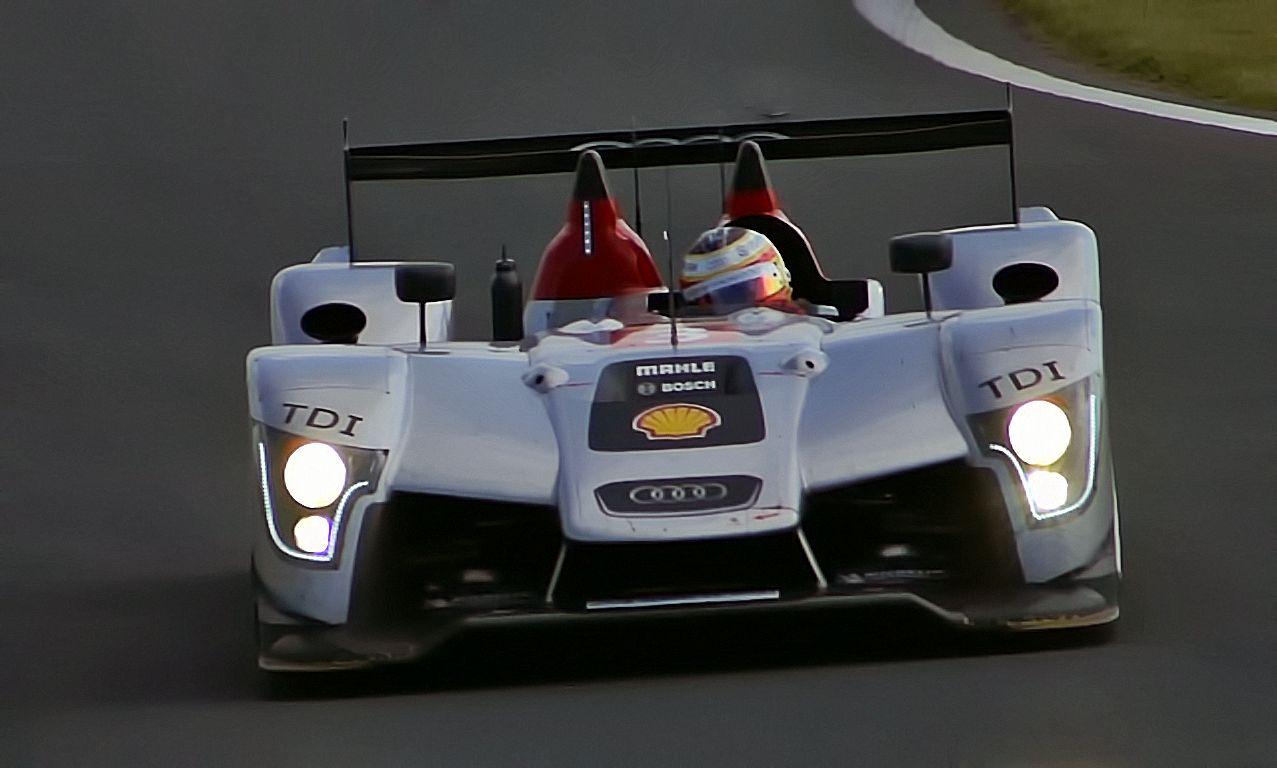
Bernhard driving an Audi R15 TDI at the 2009 24 Hours of Le Mans

- ALMS LMP2 class champion: 2007, 2008
- ALMS GT class champion: 2004
- 24 Hours of Le Mans GT class winner: 2002
- 24 Hours of Le Mans Overall winner: 2010, 2017
- 12 Hours of Sebring GT class winner: 2004
- 12 Hours of Sebring Overall winner: 2008
- Petit Le Mans LMP2 class winner: 2006
- Petit Le Mans GT class winner: 2003, 2004
- 24 Hours of Daytona overall winner: 2003
- 24 Hours of Daytona GT class winner: 2002, 2003
- 24 Hours Nürburgring winner: 2006, 2007, 2008, 2009, 2011
- Porsche Carrera Cup Germany champion: 2001

== Racing record ==
=== Career summary ===
Series/Event	Class	Years	Races	Wins	Podiums	Best season result
Open Wheel
Formula Ford 1800 Germany	1800	1999	8	0	4	3rd place (1999)
Endurance Racing
FIA World Endurance Championship	LMP1	2012-2017	33	12	23	**Champion** (2015,2017)
FIA World Endurance Championship	LMGTE Pro	2013	3	0	1	21st (2012)
Intercontinental Le Mans Cup	LMP1	2011	7	0	3	
Le Mans Series	LMP1	2010-2011	5	0	3	13th (2010)
Blancpain Endurance Series	GT3 Pro	2013	1	0	0	28th (2013)
American Le Mans Series	LMP	2006-2011	36	16	30	**Champion** (2007, 2008)
American Le Mans Series	GT	2002-2010	44	13	24	**Champion** (2004)
Grand American Rolex Series	DP	2005-2010	15	0	3	4th place (2010)
Grand American Rolex Series	GT	2002-2010	5	2	2	23rd place (2003)
VLN Endurance		2009-2012	3+		2	149th (2010)
24 Hours of Le Mans	LMP1	2009-2017	7	2	2	**Winner** (2010, 2017)
24 Hours of Le Mans	GTE Pro	2013	1	0	1	2nd place (2013)
24 Hours of Le Mans	GT	2002-2005	3	1	2	**Winner** (2002)
24 Hours of Nürburgring	SP7	2006-2013	6	6	6	**Winner** (2006-2009,2011,2013)
24 Hours of Nürburgring	A8	2003-2004	2	1	2	**Winner** (2003)
24 Hours of Nürburgring	A7	2002	1	1	1	**Winner** (2002)
GT
FIA GT Championship	GT2	2006	1	0	0	
FIA GT Championship	NGT	2001-2005	2	0	1	13th place (2004)
United SportsCar Championship	GTD	2014	1	0	0	126th place (2014)
Porsche Supercup	GT3	2001-2002	14	1	8	3rd place (2002)
Porsche Carrera Cup Germany	GT3	1999-2003	27	6	8	**Champion** (2001)
Karting
Andrea Margutti Trophy	ICA	1996				18th place (1996)
Five Continents Cup	Junior A	1995				5th place (1995)
German Kart Championship		1996-1997				3rd place (1997)
German Junior Kart Championship		1995				**Champion** (1995)

=== Complete 24 Hours of Le Mans results ===
Year	Team	Co-Drivers	Car	Class	Laps	Pos.	Class Pos.
2002	(United States) The Racer's Group	(United States) Kevin Buckler (Germany) Lucas Luhr	Porsche 911 GT3-RS	GT	322	16th	**1st**
2003	(United States) The Racer's Group	(United States) Kevin Buckler (Germany) Jörg Bergmeister	Porsche 911 GT3-RS	GT	304	20th	5th
2005	(United States) Petersen Motorsports (United States) White Lightning Racing	(Germany) Jörg Bergmeister (United States) Patrick Long	Porsche 911 GT3-RSR	GT2	331	11th	**2nd**
2009	(Germany) Audi Sport Team Joest	(France) Romain Dumas (France) Alexandre Prémat	Audi R15 TDI	LMP1	333	17th	13th
2010	(Germany) Audi Sport North America	(France) Romain Dumas (Germany) Mike Rockenfeller	Audi R15 TDI plus	LMP1	397	**1st**	**1st**
2011	(Germany) Audi Sport Team Joest	(France) Romain Dumas (Germany) Mike Rockenfeller	Audi R18 TDI	LMP1	116	DNF	DNF
2013	(Germany) Porsche AG Team Manthey	(France) Patrick Pilet (Germany) Jörg Bergmeister	Porsche 911 RSR	GTE; Pro	315	16th	**2nd**
2014	(Germany) Porsche Team	(New Zealand) Brendon Hartley (Australia) Mark Webber	Porsche 919 Hybrid	LMP1-H	346	NC	NC
2015	(Germany) Porsche Team	(New Zealand) Brendon Hartley (Australia) Mark Webber	Porsche 919 Hybrid	LMP1	394	**2nd**	**2nd**
2016	(Germany) Porsche Team	(New Zealand) Brendon Hartley (Australia) Mark Webber	Porsche 919 Hybrid	LMP1	346	13th	5th
2017	(Germany) Porsche LMP Team	(New Zealand) Brendon Hartley (New Zealand) Earl Bamber	Porsche 919 Hybrid	LMP1	367	**1st**	**1st**
2018	(United States) Porsche GT Team	(France) Romain Dumas (Germany) Sven Müller	Porsche 911 RSR	GTE; Pro	92	DNF	DNF

=== Complete FIA World Endurance Championship results ===
Year	Team		Class	Chassis Engine	Co-drivers		Results									Championship	
Year	Team		Class	Chassis Engine	Co-drivers		1	2	3	4	5	6	7	8	9	Points	Rank
2013	(Germany)	Porsche AG Team Manthey	LMGTE Pro	Porsche 911 RSR; 4.0 L Flat-6	(Germany) (France)	Jörg Bergmeister; Patrick Pilet	SIL; 7	SPA; Ret	LMS; 2	SÃO	COA	FUJ	SHA	BHR		42	12th
2014	(Germany)	Porsche Team	LMP1-H	Porsche 919 Hybrid; 2.0 L Turbo V4 (Hybrid)	(Australia) (New Zealand)	Mark Webber; Brendon Hartley	SIL; 3	SPA; 12	LMS; NC	COA; 5	FUJ; 3	SHA; 6	BHR; 3	**SÃO**; Ret		64.5	9th
2015	(Germany)	Porsche Team	LMP1	Porsche 919 Hybrid; 2.0 L Turbo V4 (Hybrid)	(Australia) (New Zealand)	Mark Webber; Brendon Hartley	**SIL**; Ret	**SPA**; 3	LMS; 2	NÜR; 1	COA; 1	**FUJ**; 1	**SHA**; 1	**BHR**; 5		166	1st
2016	(Germany)	Porsche Team	LMP1	Porsche 919 Hybrid; 2.0 L Turbo V4 (Hybrid)	(Australia) (New Zealand)	Mark Webber; Brendon Hartley	SIL; Ret	**SPA**; 26	LMS; 10	NÜR; 1	MEX; 1	COA; 1	FUJ; 3	**SHA**; 1	BHR; 3	134.5	4th
2017	(Germany)	Porsche LMP Team	LMP1	Porsche 919 Hybrid; 2.0 L Turbo V4 (Hybrid)	(New Zealand) (New Zealand)	Brendon Hartley; Earl Bamber	SIL; 2	SPA; 3	LMS; 1	NÜR; 1	MEX; 1	COA; 1	FUJ; 4	SHA; 2	BHR; 2	208	1st

^{*} Season still in progress. (key) (Races in bold indicate pole position) (Races in italics indicate fastest lap)

=== Complete WeatherTech SportsCar Championship results ===
Year	Entrant	Class	Chassis	Engine	1	2	3	4	5	6	7	8	9	10	11	Rank	Points
2014	Park Place Motorsports	GTD	Porsche 911 GT America	Porsche 4.0 L Flat-6	DAY; 23†	SEB	LGA	BEL	WGL	MOS	IMS	ELK	VIR	AUS	ATL	126th	1
2018	Tequila Patrón ESM	P	Nissan Onroak DPi	Nissan VR38DETT 3.8 L Turbo V6	DAY	SEB	LBH	MDO	DET	WGL	MOS	ELK	LGA	**PET**; 6		53rd	25
2019	Mazda Team Joest	DPi	Mazda RT24-P	Mazda MZ-2.0T 2.0 L Turbo I4	DAY; 11	SEB; 11	LBH	MDO	DET	WGL; 2	MOS	ELK	LGA	PET; 6		15th	97

^{†} Bernhard did not complete sufficient laps in order to score full points.

Sporting positions
Preceded by Jörg Bergmeister	Porsche Carrera Cup Germany champion 2001	Succeeded by Marc Lieb
Preceded by David Brabham; Marc Gené; Alexander Wurz	Winner of the 24 Hours of Le Mans; 2010; With: Romain Dumas & Mike Rockenfeller	Succeeded by Marcel Fässler; André Lotterer; Benoît Tréluyer
Preceded by Sébastien Buemi; Anthony Davidson	FIA World Endurance Champion; 2015; With: Brendon Hartley & Mark Webber	Succeeded by Romain Dumas; Marc Lieb; Neel Jani
Preceded by Romain Dumas; Neel Jani; Marc Lieb	Winner of the 24 Hours of Le Mans; 2017; With: Earl Bamber & Brendon Hartley	Succeeded by Sébastien Buemi; Kazuki Nakajima; Fernando Alonso
Preceded by Romain Dumas; Neel Jani; Marc Lieb	FIA World Endurance Champion; 2017; With: Earl Bamber & Brendon Hartley	Succeeded by Sébastien Buemi; Kazuki Nakajima; Fernando Alonso
Preceded by Sebastian Vettel	Race of Champions Nations' Cup; 2018; With: René Rast	Succeeded by Tom Kristensen; Johan Kristoffersson
