= 2014 Lone Star Le Mans =

Sports Car race

Map of the Circuit of the Americas - Grand Prix Circuit

The 2014 Lone Star Le Mans was a sports car race sanctioned by the International Motor Sports Association (IMSA) held at Circuit of the Americas in Austin, Texas, on September 20, 2014. The race served as the twelfth of thirteen scheduled rounds of the 2014 United SportsCar Championship.

== Background ==
=== Preview ===
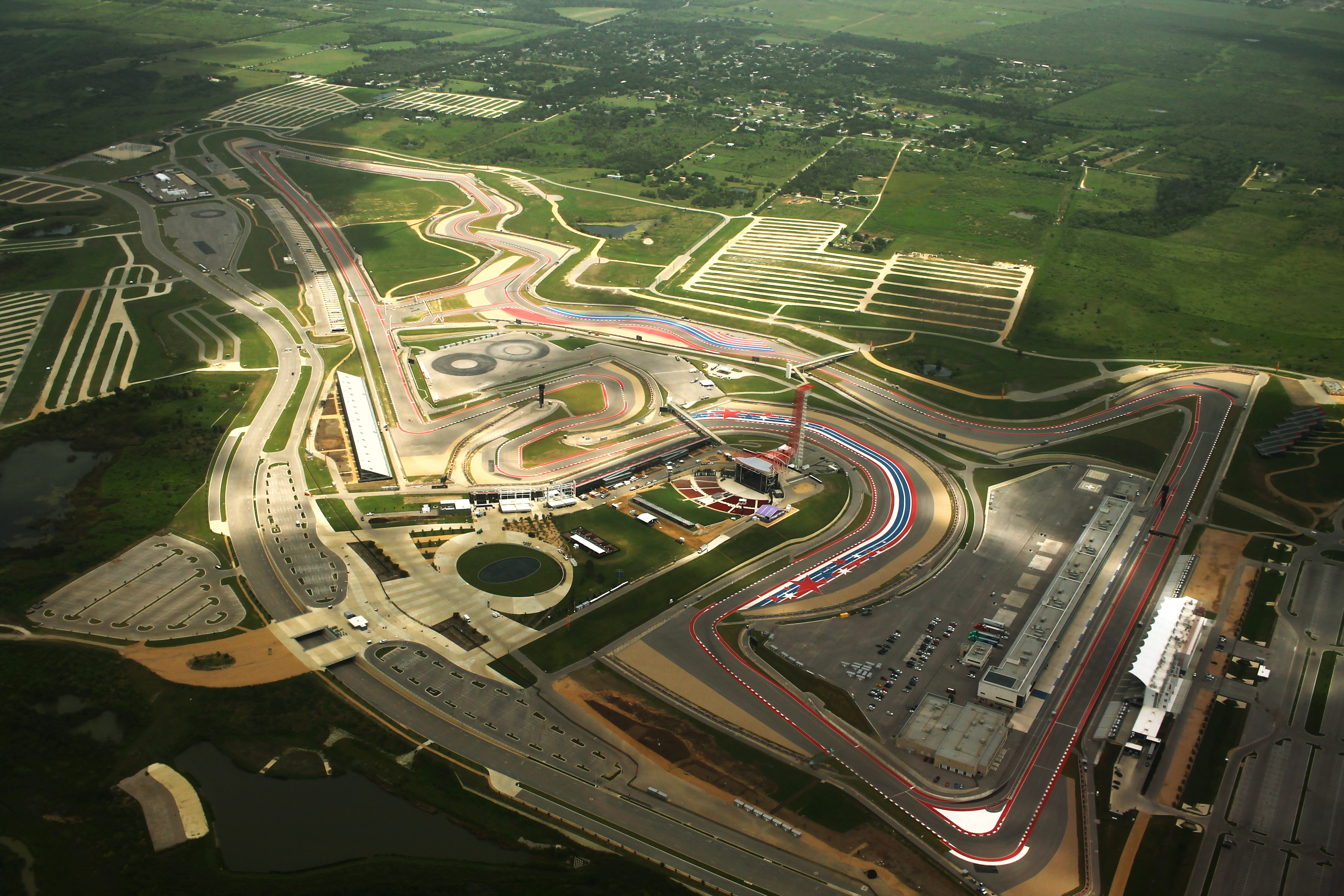
Circuit of the Americas (pictured in 2015), where the race was held.

International Motor Sports Association (IMSA) president Scott Atherton confirmed that the race was part of the 2014 United SportsCar Championship schedule in October 2013. It was the first year the event was held as part of the Tudor United SportsCar Championship. The 2014 Lone Star Le Mans was the twelfth of thirteen scheduled sports car races of 2014 by IMSA, and it was the ninth round not held as part of the North American Endurance Cup. The race was held at the twenty-turn 3.426 mi (5.514 km) Circuit of the Americas in Austin, Texas, on September 20, 2014.

Before the race, João Barbosa and Christian Fittipaldi led the Prototype Drivers' Championship with 285 points, 16 points clear of Jordan Taylor and Ricky Taylor in second. With 255 points, PC was led by Jon Bennett and Colin Braun with a forty point advantage over Renger van der Zande. In GTLM, the Drivers' Championship was led by Antonio García with 270 points, 6 points clear of Kuno Wittmer and Jonathan Bomarito. Dane Cameron led the GTD Drivers' Championship with 244 points, ahead of Bill Sweedler and Townsend Bell on countback. Chevrolet, Porsche, and Ferrari were leading their respective Manufacturers' Championships, while Action Express Racing, CORE Autosport, Corvette Racing, and Turner Motorsport were their respective Teams' Championships.

=== Entry list ===
Fifty-two cars were officially entered for the Lone Star Le Mans, with most of the entries being in the Grand Touring Le Mans (GTLM) and Grand Touring Daytona (GTD) classes. Action Express Racing (AER), Marsh Racing, VisitFlorida Racing (VFR) and Wayne Taylor Racing (WTR) entered one Chevrolet Corvette DP. Chip Ganassi Racing (CGR) and Michael Shank Racing (MSR) entered one Ford-powered Riley MkXXVI. Speedsource had two Lola B12/80 while Extreme Speed Motorsports (ESM) entered one HPD ARX-03b car and OAK Racing entered one Ligier JS P2 chassis with Honda HR28TT 2.8 L Turbo V6 engine. The Prototype Challenge (PC) class was composed of eleven Oreca FLM09 cars: two from BAR1 Motorsports, Starworks Motorsport and RSR Racing. CORE Autosport, JDC-Miller MotorSports, Performance Tech, PR1/Mathiasen Motorsports, and 8Star Motorsports entered one car each. GTLM was represented by eleven entries from five different brands. Porsche North America entered three 911 RSRs. In the list of GTD entrants, twenty GT-specification vehicles were represented by six different manufacturers.

== Practice ==
There were two practice sessions preceding the start of the races on Saturday, both on Friday. The first one-hour session ran on Friday morning while the second one-hour session ran on Friday afternoon.

== Qualifying ==
Friday afternoon's 80-minute four-group qualifying session gave 15-minute sessions to all categories. Cars in GTD were sent out first before those grouped in GTLM, PC, and Prototype had three separate identically timed sessions. Regulations stipulated teams to nominate one qualifying driver, with the fastest laps determining each classes starting order. IMSA would arranged the grid to put all Prototypes ahead of the PC, GTLM, and GTD cars.

=== Qualifying results ===
Pole positions in each class are indicated in bold and by ‡. P stands for Prototype, PC (Prototype Challenge), GTLM (Grand Touring Le Mans) and GTD (Grand Touring Daytona).

Pos.	Class	No.	Team	Driver	Time	Gap	Grid
1	**P**	**42**	**(France) OAK Racing**	**(United Kingdom) Alex Brundle**	**1:57.809**	**_**	1‡
2	P	10	(United States) Wayne Taylor Racing	(United States) Ricky Taylor	1:58.643	+0.834	2
3	P	01	(United States) Chip Ganassi Racing with Felix Sabates	(Mexico) Memo Rojas	1:58.928	+1.1199	3
4	P	5	(United States) Action Express Racing	(Brazil) Christian Fittipaldi	1:59.072	+1.263	4
5	P	2	(United States) Extreme Speed Motorsports	(United States) Johannes van Overbeek	1:59.074	+1.265	5
6	P	90	(United States) Spirit of Daytona Racing	(United Kingdom) Richard Westbrook	1:59.498	+1.689	6
7	P	60	(United States) Michael Shank Racing with Curb/Agajanian	(Brazil) Oswaldo Negri	2:00.042	+2.233	7
8	**PC**	**25**	**(United States) 8Star Motorsports**	**(United States) Sean Rayhall**	**2:00.528**	**+2.719**	8‡
9	P	31	(United States) Marsh Racing	(United States) Eric Curran	2:00.972	+3.163	9
10	PC	54	(United States) CORE Autosport	(United States) Colin Braun	2:01.085	+3.276	10
11	PC	09	(United States) RSR Racing	(Brazil) Bruno Junqueira	2:01.260	+3.451	11
12	PC	7	(United States) Starworks Motorsport	(Australia) John Martin	2:01.321	+3.512	12
13	PC	8	(United States) Starworks Motorsport	(Netherlands) Renger van der Zande	2:01.734	+3.925	13
14	PC	52	(United States) PR1/Mathiasen Motorsports	(United States) Gunnar Jeannette	2:01.982	+4.173	14
15	PC	87	(United States) BAR1 Motorsports	(United Kingdom) Martin Plowman	2:02.596	+4.787	15
16	P	07	(United States) Speedsource	(United States) Tristan Nunez	2:02.960	+5.151	16
17	GTLM	910	(United States) CORE Autosport	(France) Patrick Pilet	2:03.302	+5.493	50^{1}
18	**GTLM**	**93**	**(United States) SRT Motorsports**	**(United States) Jonathan Bomarito**	**2:03.539**	**+5.730**	17‡
19	GTLM	911	(United States) Porsche North America	(United Kingdom) Nick Tandy	2:03.649	+5.840	18
20	P	70	(United States) Speedsource	(Canada) Sylvain Tremblay	2:03.719	+5.910	19
21	GTLM	912	(United States) Porsche North America	(United States) Patrick Long	2:03.900	+6.091	20
22	GTLM	91	(United States) SRT Motorsports	(Belgium) Marc Goossens	2:04.003	+6.194	21
23	GTLM	56	(United States) BMW Team RLL	(United States) John Edwards	2:04.253	+6.444	22
24	PC	85	(United States) JDC-Miller MotorSports	(South Africa) Stephen Simpson	2:04.380	+6.571	23
25	GTLM	55	(United States) BMW Team RLL	(United Kingdom) Andy Priaulx	2:04.495	+6.686	24
26	PC	88	(United States) BAR1 Motorsports	(United Kingdom) Johnny Mowlem	2:04.726	+6.917	25
27	GTLM	3	(United States) Corvette Racing	(Denmark) Jan Magnussen	2:04.847	+7.038	26
28	GTLM	17	(United States) Team Falken Tire	(Germany) Wolf Henzler	2:04.936	+7.127	27
29	GTLM	4	(United States) Corvette Racing	(United Kingdom) Oliver Gavin	2:05.093	+7.284	28
30	GTLM	62	(United States) Risi Competizione	(Germany) Pierre Kaffer	2:05.348	+7.539	29
31	**GTD**	**007**	**(United States) TRG-AMR North America**	**(Australia) James Davison**	**2:08.502**	**+10.693**	30‡
32	GTD	33	(United States) Riley Motorsports	(Netherlands) Jeroen Bleekemolen	2:08.814	+11.005	31
33	GTD	300	(United States) Turner Motorsport	(United States) Dane Cameron	2:08.826	+11.017	32
34	GTD	71	(United States) Park Place Motorsports	(United States) Mike Skeen	2:08.984	+11.175	33
35	GTD	30	(United States) NGT Motorsport	(Poland) Kuba Giermaziak	2:09.007	+11.198	34
36	GTD	81	(United States) GB Autosport	(Republic of Ireland) Damien Faulkner	2:09.040	+11.231	35
37	GTD	44	(United States) Magnus Racing	(United States) Andy Lally	2:09.113	+11.304	36
38	GTD	58	(United States) Snow Racing	(Belgium) Jan Heylen	2:09.130	+11.321	37
39	GTD	27	(United States) Dempsey Racing	(United States) Andrew Davis	2:09.291	+11.482	38
40	GTD	45	(United States) Flying Lizard Motorsports	(United States) Spencer Pumpelly	2:09.337	+11.528	39
41	GTD	73	(United States) Park Place Motorsports	(Austria) Norbert Siedler	2:09.504	+11.695	40
42	GTD	23	(United States) Team Seattle/Alex Job Racing	(Germany) Mario Farnbacher	2:09.537	+11.728	41
43	GTD	35	(United States) Flying Lizard Motorsports	(South Africa) Dion von Moltke	2:09.664	+11.855	42
44	GTD	48	(United States) Paul Miller Racing	(Germany) Christopher Haase	2:09.772	+11.963	43
45	GTD	555	(Canada) AIM Autosport	(United States) Townsend Bell	2:09.914	+12.105	44
46	GTD	22	(United States) Alex Job Racing	(United States) Leh Keen	2:10.140	+12.331	51
47	GTD	63	(United States) Scuderia Corsa	(Italy) Alessandro Balzan	2:10.184	+12.375	45
48	GTD	18	(Belgium) Mühlner Motorsports America	(United Arab Emirates) Khaled Al Qubaisi	2:13.725	+15.916	46
49	PC	08	(United States) RSR Racing	No Time Established			47
50	PC	38	(United States) Performance Tech	(Canada) David Ostella	No Time Established^{2}		48
51	GTD	19	(Belgium) Mühlner Motorsports America	No Time Established			49
52	GTD	46	(United States) Fall-Line Motorsports	Did not participate			52
Sources:

- ^{1} The No. 910 CORE Autosport Porsche initially qualified on pole position for the GTLM class. However, the car was missing a camera pod. By IMSA rules, the entry was moved to the rear of the GTLM field on the starting grid.
- ^{2} The No. 38 Performance Tech entry had its fastest lap deleted as penalty for causing a red flag during its qualifying session.

== Race ==
=== Race results ===
Class winners are denoted in bold and ‡. P stands for Prototype, PC (Prototype Challenge), GTLM (Grand Touring Le Mans) and GTD (Grand Touring Daytona).

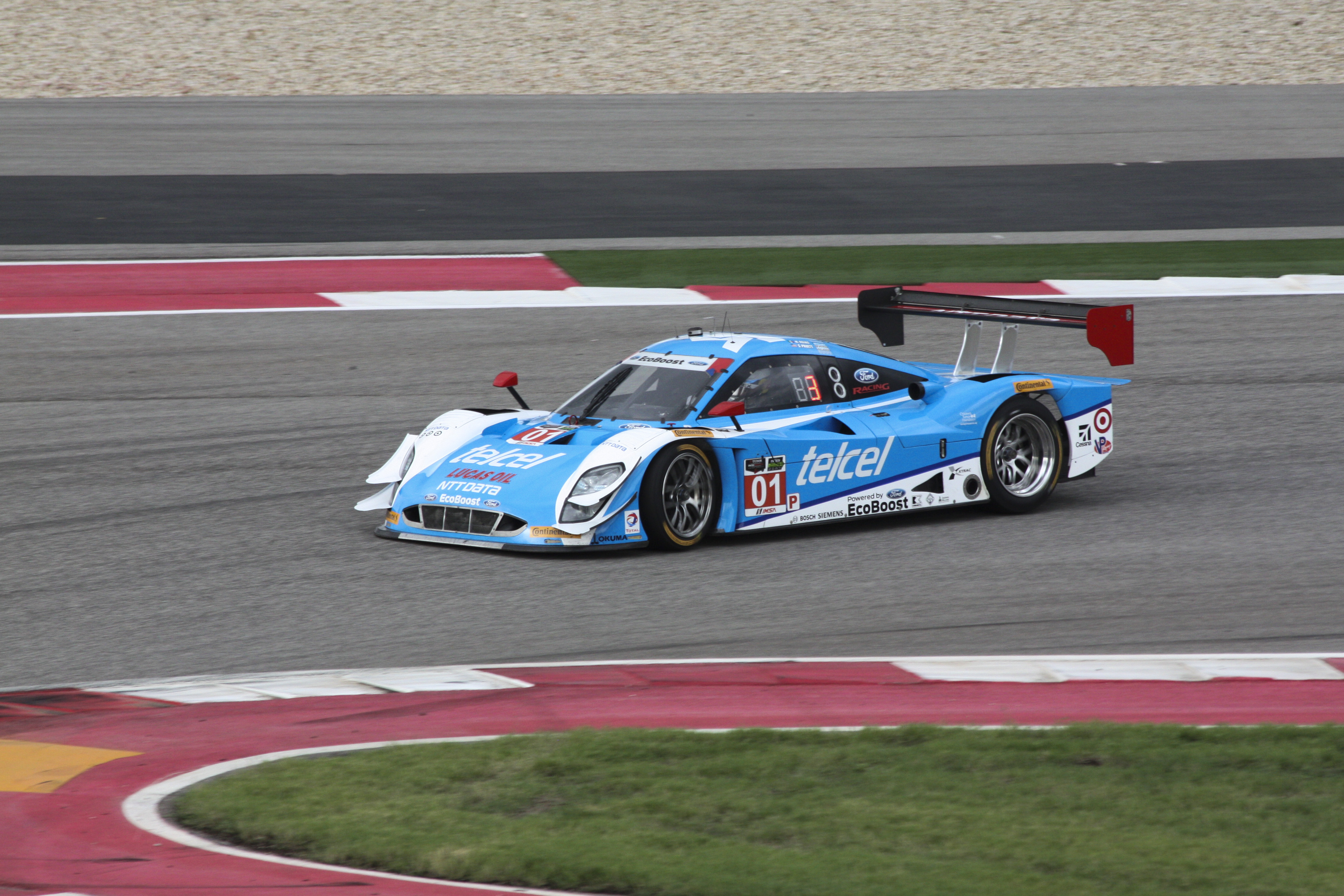
The race-winning No. 01 Riley MkXXVI of Chip Ganasi Racing with Felix Sabates.

Pos	Class	No.	Team	Drivers	Chassis	Tire	Laps	Time/Retired
Pos	Class	No.	Team	Drivers	Engine	Tire	Laps	Time/Retired
1	**P**	**01**	**(United States) Chip Ganassi Racing with Felix Sabates**	**(United States) Scott Pruett (Mexico) Memo Rojas**	**Riley MkXXVI**	C	**77**	**2:45:54.946**
1	**P**	**01**	**(United States) Chip Ganassi Racing with Felix Sabates**	**(United States) Scott Pruett (Mexico) Memo Rojas**	**Ford EcoBoost 3.5 L Turbo V6**	C	**77**	**2:45:54.946**
2	P	42	(France) OAK Racing	(Colombia) Gustavo Yacamán (United Kingdom) Alex Brundle	Ligier JS P2	C	77	+2.336
2	P	42	(France) OAK Racing	(Colombia) Gustavo Yacamán (United Kingdom) Alex Brundle	Honda HR28TT 2.8 L Turbo V6	C	77	+2.336
3	P	5	(United States) Action Express Racing	(Portugal) João Barbosa (Brazil) Christian Fittipaldi	Chevrolet Corvette DP	C	77	+11.016
3	P	5	(United States) Action Express Racing	(Portugal) João Barbosa (Brazil) Christian Fittipaldi	Chevrolet LS9 5.5 L V8	C	77	+11.016
4	P	2	(United States) Extreme Speed Motorsports	(United States) Ed Brown (United States) Johannes van Overbeek	HPD ARX-03b	C	77	+35.811
4	P	2	(United States) Extreme Speed Motorsports	(United States) Ed Brown (United States) Johannes van Overbeek	Honda HR28TT 2.8 L Turbo V6	C	77	+35.811
5	P	60	(United States) Michael Shank Racing with Curb/Agajanian	(United States) John Pew (Brazil) Oswaldo Negri	Riley MkXXVI	C	77	+48.448
5	P	60	(United States) Michael Shank Racing with Curb/Agajanian	(United States) John Pew (Brazil) Oswaldo Negri	Ford EcoBoost 3.5 L Turbo V6	C	77	+48.448
6	P	90	(United States) Spirit of Daytona Racing	(Canada) Michael Valiante (United Kingdom) Richard Westbrook	Chevrolet Corvette DP	C	77	+1:08.558
6	P	90	(United States) Spirit of Daytona Racing	(Canada) Michael Valiante (United Kingdom) Richard Westbrook	Chevrolet LS9 5.5 L V8	C	77	+1:08.558
7	P	10	(United States) Wayne Taylor Racing	(United States) Jordan Taylor (United States) Ricky Taylor	Chevrolet Corvette DP	C	77	+1:39.993
7	P	10	(United States) Wayne Taylor Racing	(United States) Jordan Taylor (United States) Ricky Taylor	Chevrolet LS9 5.5 L V8	C	77	+1:39.993
8	**PC**	**25**	**(United States) 8Star Motorsports**	**(Mexico) Luis Díaz (United States) Sean Rayhall**	**Oreca FLM09**	C	**76**	**+1 lap‡**
8	**PC**	**25**	**(United States) 8Star Motorsports**	**(Mexico) Luis Díaz (United States) Sean Rayhall**	**Chevrolet 6.2 L V8**	C	**76**	**+1 lap‡**
9	PC	54	(United States) CORE Autosport	(United States) Jon Bennett (United States) Colin Braun	Oreca FLM09	C	76	+1 lap
9	PC	54	(United States) CORE Autosport	(United States) Jon Bennett (United States) Colin Braun	Chevrolet 6.2 L V8	C	76	+1 lap
10	P	31	(United States) Marsh Racing	(United States) Eric Curran (United States) Boris Said	Chevrolet Corvette DP	C	76	+1 lap
10	P	31	(United States) Marsh Racing	(United States) Eric Curran (United States) Boris Said	Chevrolet LS9 5.5 L V8	C	76	+1 lap
11	PC	8	(United States) Starworks Motorsport	(Germany) Mirco Schultis (Netherlands) Renger van der Zande	Oreca FLM09	C	76	+1 lap
11	PC	8	(United States) Starworks Motorsport	(Germany) Mirco Schultis (Netherlands) Renger van der Zande	Chevrolet 6.2 L V8	C	76	+1 lap
12	**GTLM**	**93**	**(United States) SRT Motorsports**	**(United States) Jonathan Bomarito (Canada) Kuno Wittmer**	**SRT Viper GTS-R**	M	**76**	**+1 lap‡**
12	**GTLM**	**93**	**(United States) SRT Motorsports**	**(United States) Jonathan Bomarito (Canada) Kuno Wittmer**	**SRT 8.0 L V10**	M	**76**	**+1 lap‡**
13	GTLM	91	(United States) SRT Motorsports	(Belgium) Marc Goossens (Germany) Dominik Farnbacher	SRT Viper GTS-R	M	76	+1 lap
13	GTLM	91	(United States) SRT Motorsports	(Belgium) Marc Goossens (Germany) Dominik Farnbacher	SRT 8.0 L V10	M	76	+1 lap
14	GTLM	912	(United States) Porsche North America	(United States) Patrick Long (Denmark) Michael Christensen	Porsche 911 RSR	M	76	+1 lap
14	GTLM	912	(United States) Porsche North America	(United States) Patrick Long (Denmark) Michael Christensen	Porsche 4.0 L Flat-6	M	76	+1 lap
15	GTLM	62	(United States) Risi Competizione	(Italy) Giancarlo Fisichella (Germany) Pierre Kaffer	Ferrari 458 Italia GT2	M	75	+2 Laps
15	GTLM	62	(United States) Risi Competizione	(Italy) Giancarlo Fisichella (Germany) Pierre Kaffer	Ferrari 4.5 L V8	M	75	+2 Laps
16	GTLM	910	(United States) CORE Autosport	(France) Frédéric Makowiecki (France) Patrick Pilet	Porsche 911 RSR	M	75	+2 Laps
16	GTLM	910	(United States) CORE Autosport	(France) Frédéric Makowiecki (France) Patrick Pilet	Porsche 4.0 L Flat-6	M	75	+2 Laps
17	GTLM	55	(United States) BMW Team RLL	(United States) Bill Auberlen (United Kingdom) Andy Priaulx	BMW Z4 GTE	M	75	+2 Laps
17	GTLM	55	(United States) BMW Team RLL	(United States) Bill Auberlen (United Kingdom) Andy Priaulx	BMW 4.4 L V8	M	75	+2 Laps
18	PC	52	(United States) PR1/Mathiasen Motorsports	(United States) Gunnar Jeannette (United States) Frankie Montecalvo	Oreca FLM09	C	75	+2 Laps
18	PC	52	(United States) PR1/Mathiasen Motorsports	(United States) Gunnar Jeannette (United States) Frankie Montecalvo	Chevrolet 6.2 L V8	C	75	+2 Laps
19	GTLM	56	(United States) BMW Team RLL	(United States) John Edwards (Germany) Dirk Müller	BMW Z4 GTE	M	75	+2 Laps
19	GTLM	56	(United States) BMW Team RLL	(United States) John Edwards (Germany) Dirk Müller	BMW 4.4 L V8	M	75	+2 Laps
20	GTLM	17	(United States) Team Falken Tire	(Germany) Wolf Henzler (United States) Bryan Sellers	Porsche 911 RSR	F	75	+2 Laps
20	GTLM	17	(United States) Team Falken Tire	(Germany) Wolf Henzler (United States) Bryan Sellers	Porsche 4.0 L Flat-6	F	75	+2 Laps
21	GTLM	3	(United States) Corvette Racing	(Spain) Antonio García (Denmark) Jan Magnussen	Chevrolet Corvette C7.R	M	75	+2 Laps
21	GTLM	3	(United States) Corvette Racing	(Spain) Antonio García (Denmark) Jan Magnussen	Chevrolet LT5.5 5.5 L V8	M	75	+2 Laps
22	GTLM	4	(United States) Corvette Racing	(United Kingdom) Oliver Gavin (United States) Tommy Milner	Chevrolet Corvette C7.R	M	75	+2 Laps
22	GTLM	4	(United States) Corvette Racing	(United Kingdom) Oliver Gavin (United States) Tommy Milner	Chevrolet LT5.5 5.5 L V8	M	75	+2 Laps
23	PC	08	(United States) RSR Racing	(Canada) Chris Cumming (United Kingdom) Jack Hawksworth	Oreca FLM09	C	75	+2 Laps
23	PC	08	(United States) RSR Racing	(Canada) Chris Cumming (United Kingdom) Jack Hawksworth	Chevrolet 6.2 L V8	C	75	+2 Laps
24	PC	87	(United States) BAR1 Motorsports	(United States) Marc Drumwright (United Kingdom) Martin Plowman	Oreca FLM09	C	74	+3 Laps
24	PC	87	(United States) BAR1 Motorsports	(United States) Marc Drumwright (United Kingdom) Martin Plowman	Chevrolet 6.2 L V8	C	74	+3 Laps
25	PC	85	(United States) JDC-Miller MotorSports	(United States) Chris Miller (South Africa) Stephen Simpson	Oreca FLM09	C	74	+3 Laps
25	PC	85	(United States) JDC-Miller MotorSports	(United States) Chris Miller (South Africa) Stephen Simpson	Chevrolet 6.2 L V8	C	74	+3 Laps
26	PC	88	(United States) BAR1 Motorsports	(United Kingdom) Johnny Mowlem (United States) Tom Papadopoulos	Oreca FLM09	C	74	+3 Laps
26	PC	88	(United States) BAR1 Motorsports	(United Kingdom) Johnny Mowlem (United States) Tom Papadopoulos	Chevrolet 6.2 L V8	C	74	+3 Laps
27	P	07	(United States) Speedsource	(United States) Joel Miller (United States) Tristan Nunez	Mazda Prototype	C	73	+4 Laps
27	P	07	(United States) Speedsource	(United States) Joel Miller (United States) Tristan Nunez	Mazda Skyactiv-D 2.2 L Turbo I4 (Diesel)	C	73	+4 Laps
28	**GTD**	**33**	**(United States) Riley Motorsports**	**(United States) Ben Keating (Netherlands) Jeroen Bleekemolen**	**SRT Viper GT3-R**	C	**73**	**+4 Laps‡**
28	**GTD**	**33**	**(United States) Riley Motorsports**	**(United States) Ben Keating (Netherlands) Jeroen Bleekemolen**	**SRT 8.0 L V10**	C	**73**	**+4 Laps‡**
29	GTD	44	(United States) Magnus Racing	(United States) Andy Lally (United States) John Potter	Porsche 911 GT America	C	72	+5 Laps
29	GTD	44	(United States) Magnus Racing	(United States) Andy Lally (United States) John Potter	Porsche 4.0L Flat-6	C	72	+5 Laps
30	GTD	300	(United States) Turner Motorsport	(United States) Dane Cameron (Finland) Markus Palttala	Audi R8 LMS ultra	C	72	+5 Laps
30	GTD	300	(United States) Turner Motorsport	(United States) Dane Cameron (Finland) Markus Palttala	Audi 5.2 L V10	C	72	+5 Laps
31	GTD	58	(United States) Snow Racing	(Belgium) Jan Heylen (United States) Madison Snow	Porsche 911 GT America	C	72	+5 Laps
31	GTD	58	(United States) Snow Racing	(Belgium) Jan Heylen (United States) Madison Snow	Porsche 4.0L Flat-6	C	72	+5 Laps
32	GTD	22	(United States) Alex Job Racing	(United States) Leh Keen (United States) Cooper MacNeil	Porsche 911 GT America	C	72	+5 Laps
32	GTD	22	(United States) Alex Job Racing	(United States) Leh Keen (United States) Cooper MacNeil	Porsche 4.0L Flat-6	C	72	+5 Laps
33	GTD	48	(United States) Paul Miller Racing	(Germany) Christopher Haase (United States) Bryce Miller	Audi R8 LMS ultra	C	72	+5 Laps
33	GTD	48	(United States) Paul Miller Racing	(Germany) Christopher Haase (United States) Bryce Miller	Audi 5.2 L V10	C	72	+5 Laps
34	GTD	45	(United States) Flying Lizard Motorsports	(Venezuela) Nelson Canache Jr. (United States) Spencer Pumpelly	Audi R8 LMS ultra	C	72	+5 Laps
34	GTD	45	(United States) Flying Lizard Motorsports	(Venezuela) Nelson Canache Jr. (United States) Spencer Pumpelly	Audi 5.2 L V10	C	72	+5 Laps
35	GTD	555	(Canada) AIM Autosport	(United States) Townsend Bell (United States) Bill Sweedler	Ferrari 458 Italia GT3	C	72	+5 Laps
35	GTD	555	(Canada) AIM Autosport	(United States) Townsend Bell (United States) Bill Sweedler	Ferrari 4.5L V8	C	72	+5 Laps
36	GTD	81	(United States) GB Autosport	(United Kingdom) Ben Barker (Republic of Ireland) Damien Faulkner	Porsche 911 GT America	C	72	+5 Laps
36	GTD	81	(United States) GB Autosport	(United Kingdom) Ben Barker (Republic of Ireland) Damien Faulkner	Porsche 4.0L Flat-6	C	72	+5 Laps
37	GTD	73	(United States) Park Place Motorsports	(United States) Patrick Lindsey (Austria) Norbert Siedler	Porsche 911 GT America	C	72	+5 Laps
37	GTD	73	(United States) Park Place Motorsports	(United States) Patrick Lindsey (Austria) Norbert Siedler	Porsche 4.0L Flat-6	C	72	+5 Laps
38	GTD	63	(United States) Scuderia Corsa	(Italy) Alessandro Balzan (United States) Jeff Westphal	Ferrari 458 Italia GT3	C	72	+5 Laps
38	GTD	63	(United States) Scuderia Corsa	(Italy) Alessandro Balzan (United States) Jeff Westphal	Ferrari 4.5L V8	C	72	+5 Laps
39	GTD	30	(United States) NGT Motorsport	(Poland) Kuba Giermaziak (Venezuela) Henrique Cisneros	Porsche 911 GT America	C	71	+6 Laps
39	GTD	30	(United States) NGT Motorsport	(Poland) Kuba Giermaziak (Venezuela) Henrique Cisneros	Porsche 4.0L Flat-6	C	71	+6 Laps
40	GTD	35	(United States) Flying Lizard Motorsports	(South Africa) Dion von Moltke (United States) Spencer Pumpelly (United States) Seth Neiman	Audi R8 LMS ultra	C	70	+7 Laps
40	GTD	35	(United States) Flying Lizard Motorsports	(South Africa) Dion von Moltke (United States) Spencer Pumpelly (United States) Seth Neiman	Audi 5.2 L V10	C	70	+7 Laps
41	GTD	27	(United States) Dempsey Racing	(United States) Andrew Davis (United States) Patrick Dempsey	Porsche 911 GT America	C	70	+7 Laps
41	GTD	27	(United States) Dempsey Racing	(United States) Andrew Davis (United States) Patrick Dempsey	Porsche 4.0L Flat-6	C	70	+7 Laps
42 DNF	PC	7	(United States) Starworks Motorsport	(Australia) John Martin (Mexico) Martin Fuentes (Venezuela) Alex Popow	Oreca FLM09	C	63	Did Not Finish
42 DNF	PC	7	(United States) Starworks Motorsport	(Australia) John Martin (Mexico) Martin Fuentes (Venezuela) Alex Popow	Chevrolet 6.2 L V8	C	63	Did Not Finish
43	GTD	19	(Belgium) Mühlner Motorsports America	(United States) Mark Klenin (United States) Alec Udell	Porsche 911 GT America	C	69	+8 Laps
43	GTD	19	(Belgium) Mühlner Motorsports America	(United States) Mark Klenin (United States) Alec Udell	Porsche 4.0L Flat-6	C	69	+8 Laps
44	GTD	18	(Belgium) Mühlner Motorsports America	(United Arab Emirates) Khaled Al Qubaisi (United States) Larry Pegram	Porsche 911 GT America	C	67	+10 Laps
44	GTD	18	(Belgium) Mühlner Motorsports America	(United Arab Emirates) Khaled Al Qubaisi (United States) Larry Pegram	Porsche 4.0L Flat-6	C	67	+10 Laps
45 DNF	GTLM	911	(United States) Porsche North America	(United Kingdom) Nick Tandy (Germany) Jörg Bergmeister	Porsche 911 RSR	M	66	Did Not Finish
45 DNF	GTLM	911	(United States) Porsche North America	(United Kingdom) Nick Tandy (Germany) Jörg Bergmeister	Porsche 4.0 L Flat-6	M	66	Did Not Finish
46 DNF	GTD	71	(United States) Park Place Motorsports	(United States) Mike Skeen (United States) Mike Vess	Porsche 911 GT America	C	62	Did Not Finish
46 DNF	GTD	71	(United States) Park Place Motorsports	(United States) Mike Skeen (United States) Mike Vess	Porsche 4.0L Flat-6	C	62	Did Not Finish
47 DNF	GTD	23	(United States) Team Seattle/Alex Job Racing	(Germany) Mario Farnbacher (United Kingdom) Ian James	Porsche 911 GT America	C	58	Did Not Finish
47 DNF	GTD	23	(United States) Team Seattle/Alex Job Racing	(Germany) Mario Farnbacher (United Kingdom) Ian James	Porsche 4.0L Flat-6	C	58	Did Not Finish
48 DNF	GTD	007	(United States) TRG-AMR North America	(United States) Al Carter (Australia) James Davison	Aston Martin V12 Vantage GT3	C	46	Did Not Finish
48 DNF	GTD	007	(United States) TRG-AMR North America	(United States) Al Carter (Australia) James Davison	Aston Martin 6.0 L V12	C	46	Did Not Finish
49 DNF	PC	38	(United States) Performance Tech	(Canada) David Ostella (United States) James French	Oreca FLM09	C	36	Did Not Finish
49 DNF	PC	38	(United States) Performance Tech	(Canada) David Ostella (United States) James French	Chevrolet 6.2 L V8	C	36	Did Not Finish
50 DNF	P	70	(United States) Speedsource	(United States) Tom Long (Canada) Sylvain Tremblay	Mazda Prototype	C	16	Did Not Finish
50 DNF	P	70	(United States) Speedsource	(United States) Tom Long (Canada) Sylvain Tremblay	Mazda Skyactiv-D 2.2 L Turbo I4 (Diesel)	C	16	Did Not Finish
51 DNF	PC	09	(United States) RSR Racing	(United States) Duncan Ende (Brazil) Bruno Junqueira	Oreca FLM09	C	8	Did Not Finish
51 DNF	PC	09	(United States) RSR Racing	(United States) Duncan Ende (Brazil) Bruno Junqueira	Chevrolet 6.2 L V8	C	8	Did Not Finish
52 DNS	GTD	46	(United States) Fall-Line Motorsports	(United States) Charles Espenlaub (United States) Charles Putman	Audi R8 LMS ultra	C	--	Did Not Start
52 DNS	GTD	46	(United States) Fall-Line Motorsports	(United States) Charles Espenlaub (United States) Charles Putman	Audi 5.2 L V10	C	--	Did Not Start

Tyre manufacturers
Key
Symbol	Tyre manufacturer
**C**	Continental
**M**	Michelin
**F**	Falken Tire

United SportsCar Championship
Previous race: Oak Tree Grand Prix	2014 season	Next race: Petit Le Mans
