= Seth Neiman =

American businessperson and a professional racing driver

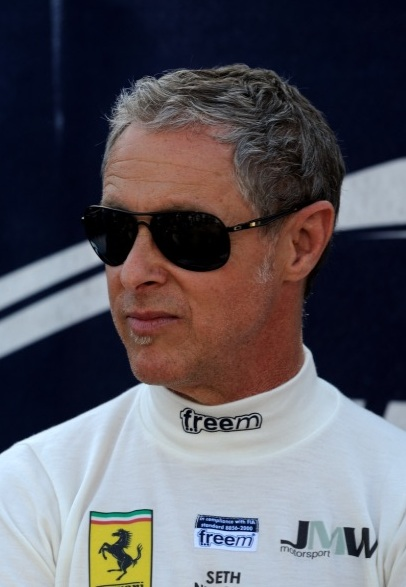
- Neiman of Flying Lizard Motorsports at the 2014 24 Hours of Le Mans
- Nationality: (United States) American
- Born: Seth David Neiman; June 27, 1954 (age 72) East Liverpool, Ohio, U.S.
- Categorisation: FIA Silver (until 2013); FIA Bronze (2014–)
24 Hours of Le Mans career
- Years: 2005 – 2012, 2014
- Teams: Flying Lizard Motorsports
- Best finish: 13th (3rd in class)(2005)
- Class wins: 0

Seth David Neiman (born June 27, 1954) is an American computer industry businessperson and venture capitalist in California, and a professional racing driver.

Neiman is the team principal of Flying Lizard Motorsports, which participates in the United SportsCar Championship. He currently resides in San Francisco, California.

== Early life ==
Seth David Neiman was born in East Liverpool, Ohio and grew up in Dayton, Ohio. His mother was Judith Klapper Neiman and father was Ralph Bernard Neiman. The second child of four, he had two sisters and a younger brother.

Neiman graduated from Ohio State University with a Bachelor's degree in philosophy and did graduate work in computer science.

== Business career ==
Neiman was a system architect at Maxitron Corporation in Marin County during the mid-1980s, and then Vice President of Product Development at Dahlgren Control Systems in San Francisco. In 1988, he became Vice President of Product Development for the TOPS Division of Sun Microsystems, that was developing the TOPS network file server system.

In 1994, Neiman joined the venture capital firm Crosspoint Venture Partners, and becoming a general partner before departing. In 1995, he founded Brocade Communications Systems. Neiman served as a lead investor and board member of various broadband computer networking companies, including Foundry Networks, Avanex, iPass, Shoreline, Juniper Networks, and NexPrise.

Neiman has been Chairman of the Board of eSilicon Corporation since 2011, and a Director at AlephCloud Systems Inc. since 2013. He is also a Director at the facial expression recognition system company Emotient, Inc.

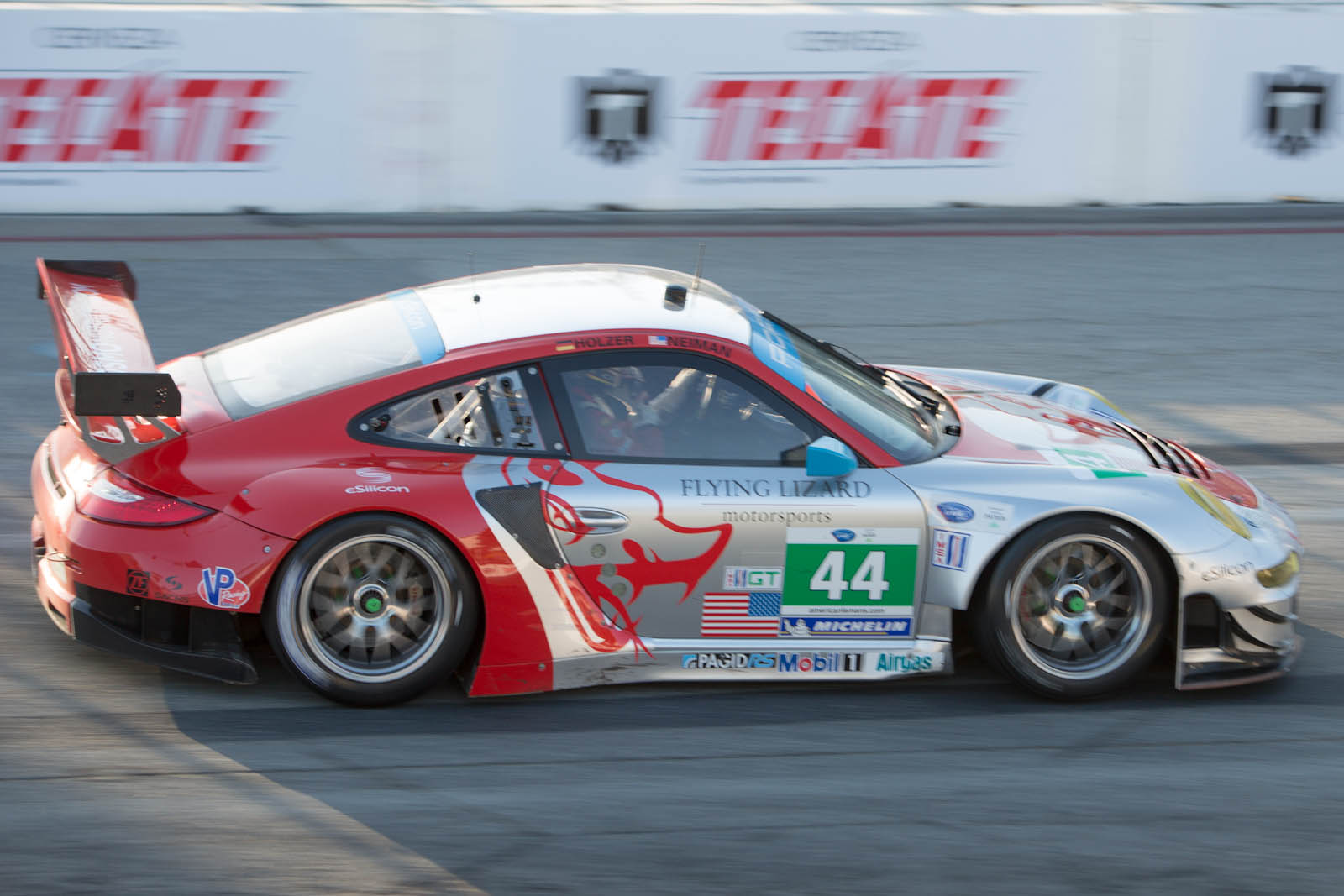
Seth Neiman Flying Lizard Porsche LBGP (2012).

== Racing career ==
Neiman formed Flying Lizard Motorsports team in 2003. In 2005, he competed in the ALMS GT2 class for the Porsche team as well as finishing third in GT2 class in the 24 Hours of Le Mans. He finished fourth at Le Mans the following year and finished 9th in ALMS GT2 points for the same team in 2006. He also drove in four SCCA World Challenge races in the Touring Car class.

In 2007, Neiman finished tenth in ALMS and the car failed to finish at Le Mans. In 2008, he captured a career best fifth place in ALMS GT2 points and finished sixth at Le Mans. In 2009, he again failed to finish at Le Mans and finished seventh in ALMS points.

Neiman returned to the Flying Lizards team he owns in 2010, and competed in his first 24 Hours of Daytona, finishing ninth overall and second in GT.

=== 24 Hours of Le Mans results ===
Year	Team	Co-Drivers	Car	Class	Laps	Pos.	Class Pos.
2005	(United States) Flying Lizard Motorsports	(United States) Johannes van Overbeek (United States) Lonnie Pechnik	Porsche 911 GT3-RSR	GT2	323	13th	**3rd**
2006	(United States) Flying Lizard Motorsports	(United States) Johannes van Overbeek (United States) Patrick Long	Porsche 911 GT3-RSR	GT2	309	18th	4th
2007	(United States) Flying Lizard Motorsports	(Germany) Jörg Bergmeister (United States) Johannes van Overbeek	Porsche 997 GT3-RSR	GT2	124	DNF	DNF
2008	(United States) Flying Lizard Motorsports	(Germany) Jörg Bergmeister (United States) Johannes van Overbeek	Porsche 997 GT3-RSR	GT2	289	32nd	6th
2009	(United States) Flying Lizard Motorsports	(Germany) Jörg Bergmeister (United States) Darren Law	Porsche 997 GT3-RSR	GT2	194	DNF	DNF
2010	(United States) Flying Lizard Motorsports	(Germany) Jörg Bergmeister (United States) Darren Law	Porsche 997 GT3-RSR	GT2	61	DNF	DNF
2011	(United States) Flying Lizard Motorsports	(United States) Darren Law (United States) Spencer Pumpelly	Porsche 997 GT3-RSR	GTE; Am	211	DNF	DNF
2012	(United States) Flying Lizard Motorsports	(France) Patrick Pilet (United States) Spencer Pumpelly	Porsche 997 GT3-RSR	GTE; Am	313	27th	4th
2014	(United Kingdom) JMW Motorsport	(Saudi Arabia) Abdulaziz Al-Faisal (United States) Spencer Pumpelly	Ferrari 458 Italia GT2	GTE; Am	327	27th	7th

=== IMSA SportsCar Championship results ===
(key)(Races in bold indicate pole position, Results are overall/class)

Year	Team	Class	Make	Engine	1	2	3	4	5	6	7	8	9	10	11	Rank	Points
2014	Flying Lizard Motorsports	GTD	Audi R8 LMS ultra	Audi 5.2L V10	DAY; 5	SEB; 5	LAG; 5	DET; 13	WGI; 7	MOS; 14	IND	ELK	VIR	COA; 13	ROA; 12	22nd	167
