= Patrick Pilet =

French racing driver

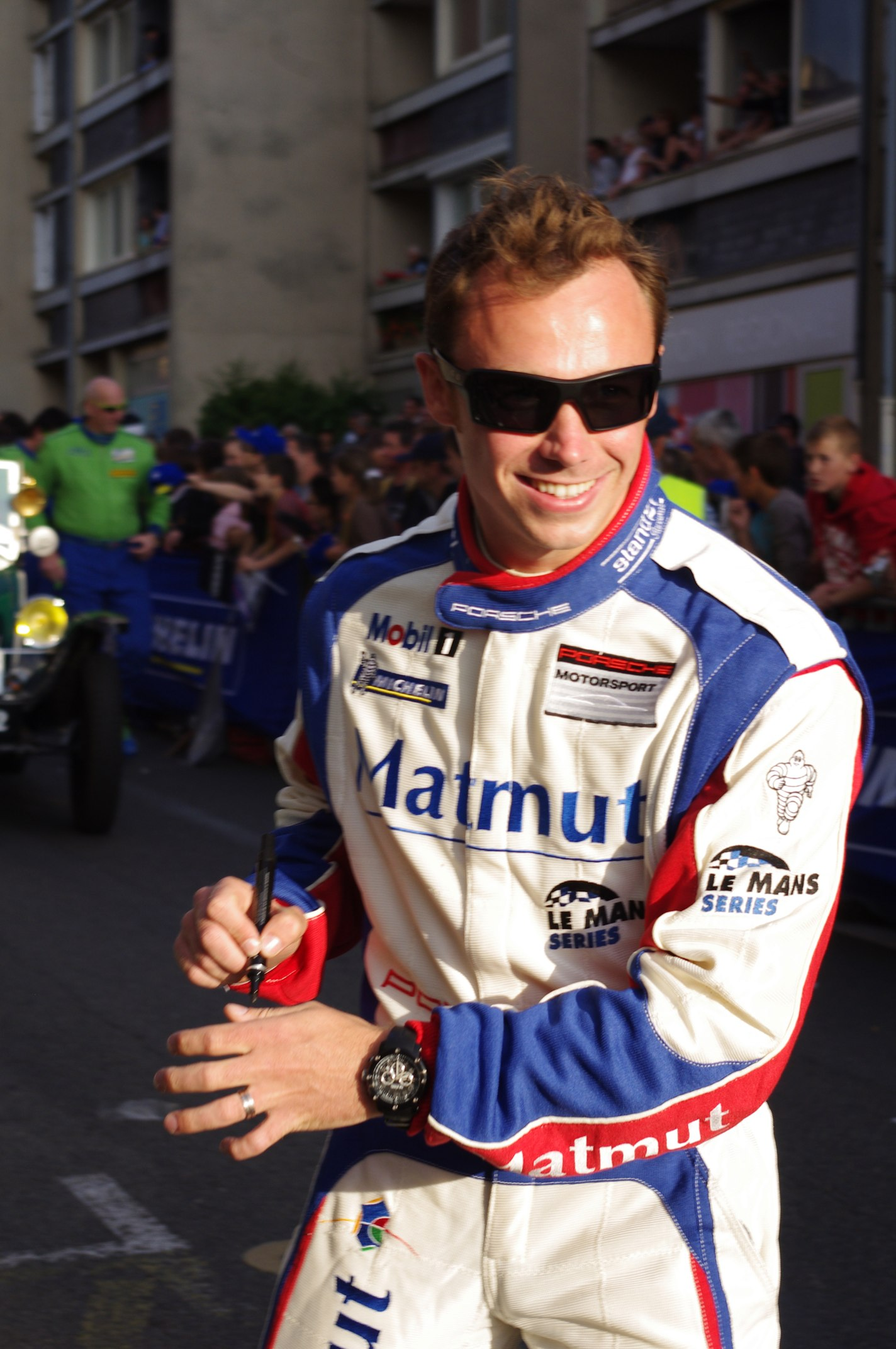
- Patrick Pilet, Le Mans drivers parade 2011
- Nationality: (France) French
- Born: 8 October 1981 (age 45) Auch, France

FIA World Endurance Championship career
- Current team: Porsche Team Manthey
- Categorisation: FIA Platinum
- Car number: 92

Championship titles
- 2018–2019, 2023 2018 2015 2015 2014 2007 2004: 12 Hours of Sebring; 24 Hours of Nürburgring; IMSA SportsCar Championship; Petit Le Mans; 24 Hours of Daytona; Porsche Carrera Cup France; Formula Renault 2.0 France
24 Hours of Le Mans career
- Years: 2009 –
- Teams: IMSA Performance, Flying Lizard, Porsche GT Team, IDEC Sport, Graff, Vector Sport, RLR MSport
- Best finish: 11th (2021)
- Class wins: 0

Patrick Grégory Yoan Pilet (born 8 October 1981) is a French professional racing driver. A long-serving Porsche works driver, he has won major sports car endurance races such as Nürburgring, Daytona, Sebring and Petit Le Mans, and finished on the podium at the 24 Hours of Le Mans.

Born in Auch, Gers, Pilet won the Championnat de France Formula Renault 2.0 in 2004 and competed at the Formula Renault 2000 Eurocup. In 2005 he switched to Formula Renault 3.5 Series, finishing 11th having missed three rounds. He drove full-time in Formula Renault 3.5 in 2006, but he finished 21st.

Pilet switched to sports car racing in 2007, and was crowned Porsche Carrera Cup France champion with IMSA Performance.

In 2009 and 2010, Pilet raced full-time for IMSA Performance at the International GT Open together with Raymond Narac in a Super GT class Porsche 911. He finished fifth in 2009 with six wins in 16 races and seventh in 2010 with four wins in 16 races. He finished second at the 24 Hours of Spa, also in an IMSA Performance Porsche with Narac, Patrick Long and Richard Lietz.

Pilet drove for Team Art Taste, a new Japanese Super GT team using Porsche 911 GT3R, in 2011 Super GT season. Also, he raced full-time for IMSA Performance at the Le Mans Series, again with Porsche with Wolf Henzler as partner, collecting one podium.

In 2020, Pilet was due to drive for the factory Porsche GT Team from America, but due to the COVID-19 pandemic, the team decided not to travel to Le Mans. Because of a crash of the IDEC car of Dwight Merriman which caused an injury, the team needed a new driver. Because Pilet was a reserve driver for Porsche, he was already in the mandatory bubble, and he stepped in to drive the IDEC Oreca 07.

== Racing record ==
=== Career summary ===
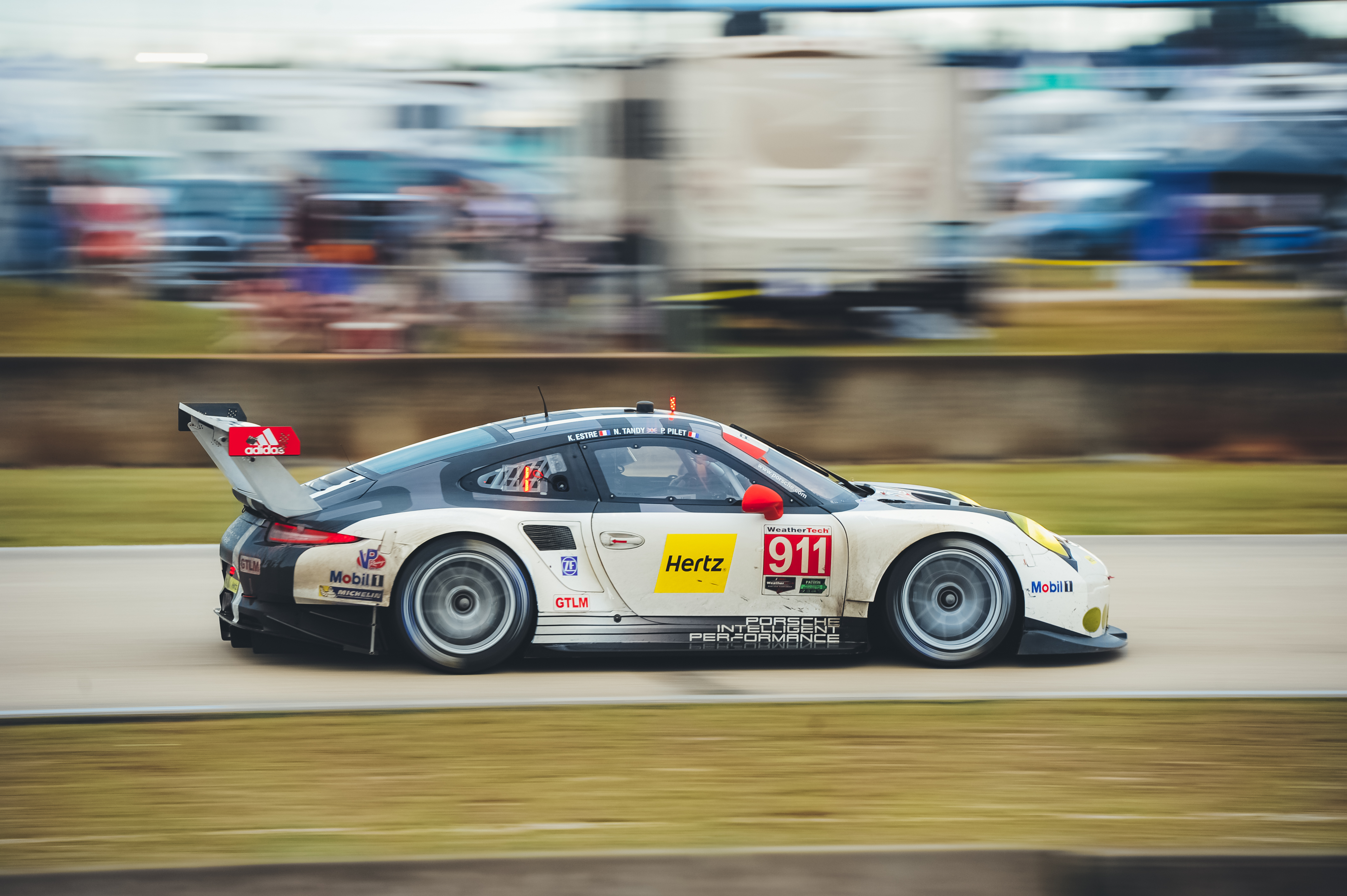
Pilet's factory Porsche 911 RSR at the 2016 12 Hours of Sebring.

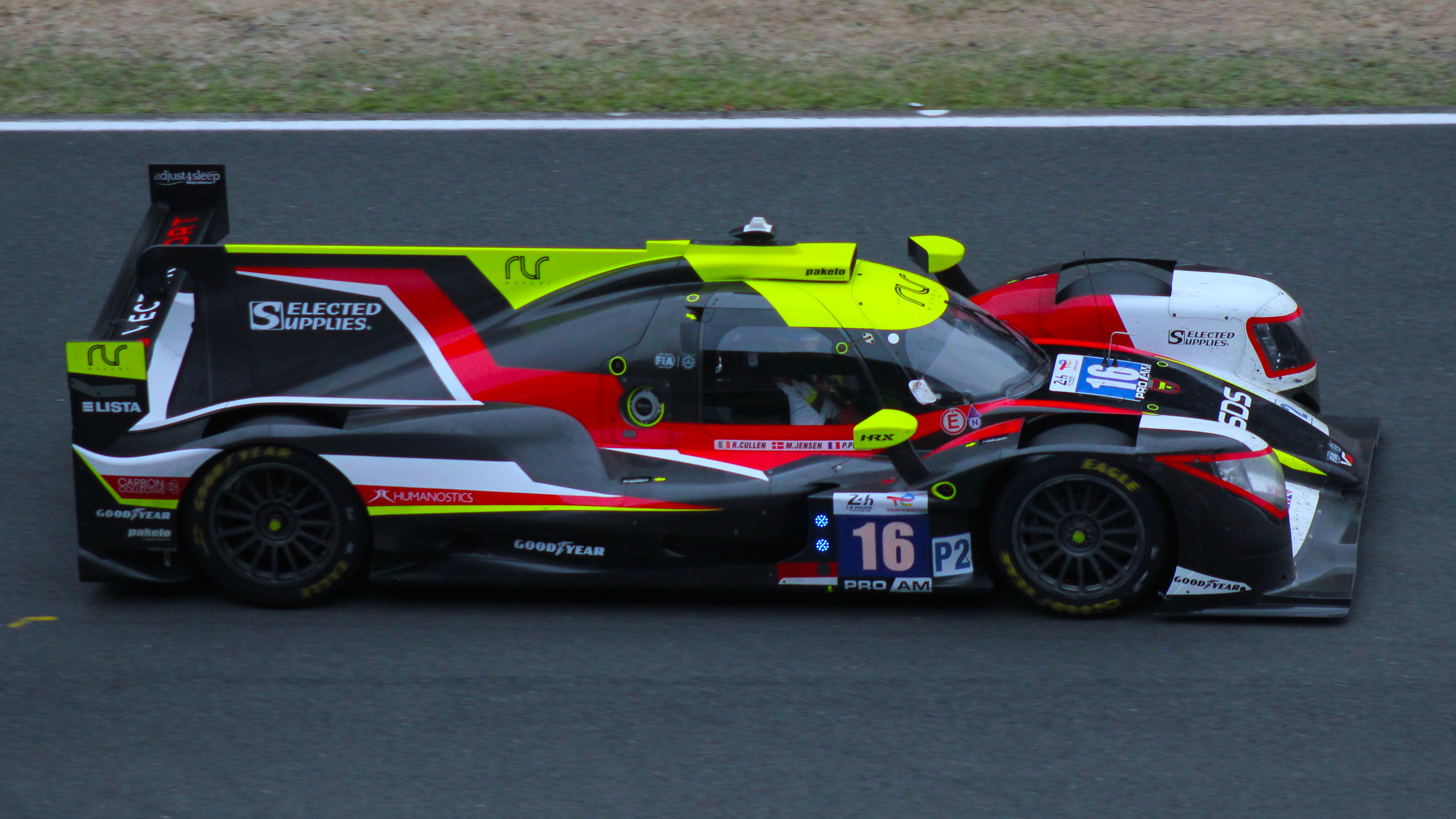
Pilet racing for RLR MSport in LMP2 at the 2025 24 Hours of Le Mans.

Season	Series	Team	Races	Wins	Poles	F/Laps	Podiums	Points	Position
2002	French Formula Renault 2000	Graff Racing	8	0	0	0	4	67	6th
2003	French Formula Renault 2000	Graff Racing	10	2	?	?	?	178	**2nd**
2004	French Formula Renault 2000	Graff Racing	14	5	7	3	10	300	**1st**
2004	Formula Renault 2000 Eurocup	Graff Racing	9	1	0	1	1	102	9th
2005	Formula Renault 3.5	Jenzer Motorsport	7	0	0	0	0	43	11th
2005	Formula Renault 3.5	GD Racing	4	0	0	0	1	43	11th
2006	Formula Renault 3.5	GD Racing	9	0	0	0	0	14	21st
2006	Formula Renault 3.5	Tech 1 Racing	6	0	0	0	0	14	21st
2007	Porsche Carrera Cup France	Graff Racing	14	4	2	0	9	181	**1st**
2008	American Le Mans Series - GT2	Flying Lizard Motorsports	11	0	0	2	5	139	5th
2008	Rolex Sports Car Series - GT	Alegra Motorsports	1	0	0	0	0	0	NC
2009	International GT Open - Super GT	IMSA Performance Matmut	16	5	3	4	10	91	**3rd**
2009	FIA GT Championship - GT2	IMSA Performance Matmut	1	0	0	0	0	0	NC
2009	Le Mans Series - GT2	IMSA Performance Matmut	5	0	0	0	2	19	8th
2009	24 Hours of Le Mans - GT2	IMSA Performance Matmut	1	0	0	0	0	N/A	DNF
2009	Rolex Sports Car Series - GT	Wright Motorsports	1	0	0	0	1	30	57th
2010	International GT Open - Super GT	IMSA Performance Matmut	16	4	1	5	8	78	4th
2010	Le Mans Series - GT2	IMSA Performance Matmut	5	0	0	0	1	47	10th
2010	24 Hours of Le Mans - GT2	IMSA Performance Matmut	1	0	0	0	0	N/A	5th
2010	24 Hours of Spa - GT2	IMSA Performance Matmut	1	0	0	0	1	N/A	**2nd**
2010	American Le Mans Series - GT2	Flying Lizard Motorsports	1	0	0	0	0	4	35th
2010	American Le Mans Series - GT2	Team Falken Tire	1	0	0	0	0	4	35th
2011	Le Mans Series - LMGTE Pro	IMSA Performance Matmut	5	0	0	1	1	27	6th
2011	24 Hours of Le Mans - LMGTE Pro	IMSA Performance Matmut	1	0	0	0	0	N/A	5th
2011	American Le Mans Series - GT	Flying Lizard Motorsports	1	0	0	0	1	30	17th
2011	Rolex Sports Car Series - GT	The Racer's Group	1	0	0	0	0	16	108th
2012	FIA World Endurance Championship - LMGTE Pro	Felbermayr-Proton	1	0	0	0	1	0	NC††
2012	American Le Mans Series - GT	Flying Lizard Motorsports	1	0	0	0	0	12	23rd
2012	24 Hours of Le Mans - LMGTE Am	Flying Lizard Motorsports	1	0	0	0	0	N/A	4th
2012	American Le Mans Series - GTC	TRG	1	0	0	0	0	12	23rd
2012	Rolex Sports Car Series - GT	TRG	1	1	0	0	1	0	NC†
2013	FIA World Endurance Championship - LMGTE Pro	Porsche Team Manthey	8	0	0	0	5	109.5	4th
2013	24 Hours of Le Mans - LMGTE Pro	Porsche Team Manthey	1	0	0	0	1	N/A	**2nd**
2013	Rolex Sports Car Series - GT	MOMO/NGT Motorsport	1	0	0	0	0	16	62nd
2013	Blancpain Endurance Series - Pro	Manthey Racing	1	0	0	0	1	39	6th
2013	24 Hours of Nürburgring - SP9	Frikadelli Racing Team	1	0	0	0	0	N/A	12th
2014	FIA World Endurance Championship - LMGTE Pro	Porsche Team Manthey	8	1	0	0	5	108.5	4th
2014	24 Hours of Le Mans - LMGTE Pro	Porsche Team Manthey	1	0	0	0	0	N/A	7th
2014	United SportsCar Championship - GTLM	Porsche North America	4	1	1	1	1	140	16th
2014	United SportsCar Championship - GTLM	CORE Autosport	1	0	0	0	0	140	16th
2014	24 Hours of Nürburgring - SP9	Frikadelli Racing Team	1	0	0	0	0	N/A	DNF
2015	FIA World Endurance Championship - LMGTE Pro	Porsche Team Manthey	7	1	0	0	5	100	6th
2015	24 Hours of Le Mans - LMGTE Pro	Porsche Team Manthey	1	0	0	0	0	N/A	DNF
2015	United SportsCar Championship - GTLM	Porsche North America	10	4	2	1	6	315	**1st**
2015	24 Hours of Nürburgring - SP9	Frikadelli Racing Team	1	0	0	0	0	N/A	DNF
2016	IMSA SportsCar Championship - GTLM	Porsche North America	11	1	1	0	2	285	8th
2016	24 Hours of Le Mans - LMGTE Pro	Porsche Motorsport	1	0	0	0	0	N/A	DNF
2016	Blancpain GT Series Endurance Cup	IMSA Performance	1	0	0	0	0	1	54th
2016	24 Hours of Nürburgring - SP9	Manthey Racing	1	0	0	0	0	N/A	DNF
2017	FIA World Endurance Championship - LMGTE Pro	Porsche GT Team	1	0	0	0	1	30	15th
2017	24 Hours of Le Mans - LMGTE Pro	Porsche GT Team	1	0	0	0	0	N/A	4th
2017	IMSA SportsCar Championship - GTLM	Porsche GT Team	11	1	1	3	3	295	5th
2017	24 Hours of Nürburgring - SP9	Manthey Racing	1	0	0	0	0	N/A	DNF
2018	IMSA SportsCar Championship - GTLM	Porsche GT Team	11	2	1	2	3	299	7th
2018	24 Hours of Le Mans - LMGTE Pro	Porsche GT Team	1	0	0	0	0	N/A	10th
2018	24 Hours of Nürburgring - SP9	Manthey Racing	1	1	0	0	1	N/A	**1st**
2019	IMSA SportsCar Championship - GTLM	Porsche GT Team	11	3	3	2	5	299	**2nd**
2019	24 Hours of Le Mans - LMGTE Pro	Porsche GT Team	1	0	0	0	1	N/A	**3rd**
2019	Blancpain GT Series Endurance Cup	Rowe Racing	1	0	0	0	1	18	14th
2019	24 Hours of Nürburgring - SP9	Manthey Racing	1	0	0	0	0	N/A	DNF
2020	IMSA SportsCar Championship - GTD	Pfaff Motorsports	1	0	1	0	0	44	35th
2020	GT World Challenge Europe Endurance Cup	GPX Racing	4	0	0	0	2	65	**2nd**
2020	Intercontinental GT Challenge	GPX Racing	2	0	0	1	2	45	**2nd**
2020	Intercontinental GT Challenge	Absolute Racing	1	0	1	0	1	45	**2nd**
2020	24 Hours of Le Mans - LMP2	IDEC Sport	1	0	0	0	0	N/A	11th
2021	European Le Mans Series - LMP2	IDEC Sport	5	0	0	0	0	30	10th
2021	24 Hours of Le Mans - LMP2	IDEC Sport	1	0	0	0	0	N/A	6th
2021	24 Hours of Nürburgring - SP9	Frikadelli Racing Team	1	0	0	0	0	N/A	DNF
2022	IMSA SportsCar Championship - GTD Pro	KCMG	1	0	0	1	1	321	24th
2022	European Le Mans Series - LMP2	IDEC Sport	6	1	0	0	1	53	6th
2022	24 Hours of Le Mans - LMP2	IDEC Sport	1	0	0	0	0	N/A	8th
2022	24 Hours of Nürburgring - SP9 Pro	Falken Motorsports	1	0	0	0	0	N/A	8th
2023	IMSA SportsCar Championship - GTD Pro	Pfaff Motorsports	11	1	1	0	7	3578	4th
2023	GT World Challenge Asia	R&B Racing	6	1	0	0	3	68	11th
2023	24 Hours of Le Mans - LMP2 Pro-Am	Graff Racing	1	0	0	0	0	N/A	4th
2023	24 Hours of Nürburgring - SP9 Pro	Lionspeed by Car Collection Motorsport	1	0	0	0	0	N/A	DNF
2024	European Le Mans Series - LMP2	Vector Sport	1	0	0	0	0	0	27th
2024	24 Hours of Le Mans - LMP2	Vector Sport	1	0	0	0	0	N/A	5th
2024	GT World Challenge Europe Endurance Cup	HubAuto Racing	1	0	0	0	0	0	NC
2024	GT World Challenge Asia	Origine Motorsport	4	1	0	0	1	31	21st
2025	GT World Challenge Asia	Absolute Racing	10	0	0	0	1	35	17th
2025	Intercontinental GT Challenge	Absolute Racing	1	0	0	0	1	18	21st
2025	24 Hours of Le Mans - LMP2 Pro-Am	RLR MSport	1	0	0	0	0	N/A	7th
2025	24 Hours of Nürburgring - SP9 Pro	Scherer Sport PHX	0	0	0	0	0	N/A	WD

=== Complete Formula Renault 3.5 Series results ===
(key) (Races in bold indicate pole position) (Races in italics indicate fastest lap)

Year	Entrant	1	2	3	4	5	6	7	8	9	10	11	12	13	14	15	16	17	DC	Points	Ref
2005	Jenzer Motorsport	ZOL; 1; 10	ZOL; 2; 7	MON; 1; 13	VAL; 1; 6	VAL; 2; 7	LMS; 1; 8	LMS; 2; 10	BIL; 1	BIL; 2	OSC; 1	OSC; 2	DON; 1	DON; 2					11th	43	
2005	GD Racing														EST; 1; 7	EST; 2; 8	MNZ; 1; 4	MNZ; 2; 3	11th	43	
2006	GD Racing	ZOL; 1; 21†	ZOL; 2 Ret	MON; 1; 13	IST; 1 Ret	IST; 2; 7	MIS; 1; 15	MIS; 2; 12	SPA; 1; 21†	SPA; 2; 14	NÜR; 1	NÜR; 2							21st	14	
2006	Tech 1 Racing												DON; 1; 13	DON; 2; 14	LMS; 1; 5	LMS; 2; 7	CAT; 1; 14	CAT; 2; 19†	21st	14	

^{†} Driver did not finish the race, but was classified as he completed more than 90% of the race distance.

=== Complete 24 Hours of Le Mans results ===
Year	Team	Co-Drivers	Car	Class	Laps	Pos.	Class Pos.
2009	(France) IMSA Performance Matmut	(France) Raymond Narac (United States) Patrick Long	Porsche 997 GT3-RSR	GT2	265	DNF	DNF
2010	(France) IMSA Performance Matmut	(France) Raymond Narac (United States) Patrick Long	Porsche 997 GT3-RSR	GT2	321	17th	5th
2011	(France) IMSA Performance Matmut	(France) Raymond Narac (France) Nicolas Armindo	Porsche 997 GT3-RSR	GTE; Pro	311	17th	5th
2012	(United States) Flying Lizard Motorsports	(United States) Seth Neiman (United States) Spencer Pumpelly	Porsche 997 GT3-RSR	GTE; Am	311	27th	4th
2013	(Germany) Porsche AG Team Manthey	(Germany) Timo Bernhard (Germany) Jörg Bergmeister	Porsche 911 RSR	GTE; Pro	315	16th	**2nd**
2014	(Germany) Porsche Team Manthey	(United Kingdom) Nick Tandy (Germany) Jörg Bergmeister	Porsche 911 RSR	GTE; Pro	309	36th	7th
2015	(Germany) Porsche Team Manthey	(France) Frédéric Makowiecki (Germany) Wolf Henzler	Porsche 911 RSR	GTE; Pro	14	DNF	DNF
2016	(Germany) Porsche Motorsport	(France) Kévin Estre (United Kingdom) Nick Tandy	Porsche 911 RSR	GTE; Pro	135	DNF	DNF
2017	(Germany) Porsche GT Team	(Austria) Richard Lietz (France) Frédéric Makowiecki	Porsche 911 RSR	GTE; Pro	339	20th	4th
2018	(United States) Porsche GT Team	(United Kingdom) Nick Tandy (New Zealand) Earl Bamber	Porsche 911 RSR	GTE; Pro	334	27th	10th
2019	(United States) Porsche GT Team	(United Kingdom) Nick Tandy (New Zealand) Earl Bamber	Porsche 911 RSR	GTE; Pro	342	22nd	**3rd**
2020	(France) IDEC Sport	(United Kingdom) Jonathan Kennard (United Kingdom) Kyle Tilley	Oreca 07-Gibson	LMP2	363	15th	11th
2021	(France) IDEC Sport	(France) Paul Lafargue (France) Paul-Loup Chatin	Oreca 07-Gibson	LMP2	359	11th	6th
2022	(France) IDEC Sport	(France) Paul Lafargue (France) Paul-Loup Chatin	Oreca 07-Gibson	LMP2	366	12th	8th
2023	(France) Graff Racing	(Netherlands) Giedo van der Garde (Italy) Roberto Lacorte	Oreca 07-Gibson	LMP2	303	37th	16th
2023	(France) Graff Racing	(Netherlands) Giedo van der Garde (Italy) Roberto Lacorte	Oreca 07-Gibson	LMP2 Pro-Am	303	37th	4th
2024	(United Kingdom) Vector Sport	(Republic of Ireland) Ryan Cullen (Monaco) Stéphane Richelmi	Oreca 07-Gibson	LMP2	297	19th	5th
2025	(United Kingdom) RLR MSport	(Republic of Ireland) Ryan Cullen (Denmark) Michael Jensen	Oreca 07-Gibson	LMP2	362	29th	12th
2025	(United Kingdom) RLR MSport	(Republic of Ireland) Ryan Cullen (Denmark) Michael Jensen	Oreca 07-Gibson	LMP2 Pro-Am	362	29th	7th

=== Complete European Le Mans Series results ===
(key) (Races in bold indicate pole position; results in italics indicate fastest lap)

Year	Entrant	Class	Chassis	Engine	1	2	3	4	5	6	Pos.	Points
2009	IMSA Performance Matmut	GT2	Porsche 997 GT3-RSR	Porsche 4.0 L Flat-6	CAT; Ret	SPA; 6	ALG; 2	NÜR; 5	SIL; 3		8th	19
2010	IMSA Performance Matmut	GT2	Porsche 997 GT3-RSR	Porsche 4.0 L Flat-6	LEC; 7	SPA; 5	ALG; 10	HUN; 3	SIL; 6		5th	47
2011	IMSA Performance Matmut	GTE Pro	Porsche 997 GT3-RSR	Porsche 4.0 L Flat-6	LEC; Ret	SPA; Ret	IMO; 5	SIL; 7	EST; 3		6th	27
2021	IDEC Sport	LMP2	Oreca 07	Gibson GK428 4.2 L V8	CAT; 8	RBR; 6	LEC	MNZ; 9	SPA; 6	ALG; 7	10th	30
2022	IDEC Sport	LMP2	Oreca 07	Gibson GK428 4.2 L V8	LEC; 4	IMO; 5	MNZ; 1	CAT; 13	SPA; Ret	ALG; 7	6th	53
2024	Vector Sport	LMP2	Oreca 07	Gibson GK428 4.2 L V8	CAT	LEC	IMO	SPA	MUG; 12	ALG	27th	0

=== Complete FIA World Endurance Championship results ===
(key) (Races in bold indicate pole position; results in italics indicate fastest lap)

Year	Entrant	Class	Chassis	Engine	1	2	3	4	5	6	7	8	9	Rank	Points
2012	Team Felbermayr-Proton	LMGTE Pro	Porsche 997 GT3-RSR	Porsche 4.0 L Flat-6	SEB; 2	SPA	LMS	SIL	SÃO	BHR	FUJ	SHA		NC	0
2013	Porsche AG Team Manthey	LMGTE Pro	Porsche 911 RSR	Porsche 4.0 L Flat-6	SIL; 7	SPA; Ret	LMS; 2	SÃO; 3	COA; 9	FUJ; 3	SHA; 3	BHR; 2		6th	99.5
2014	Porsche Team Manthey	LMGTE Pro	Porsche 911 RSR	Porsche 4.0 L Flat-6	SIL; 2	SPA; 2	LMS; 11	COA; 2	FUJ; 11	SHA; 1	BHR; 5	SÃO; 2		4th	108.5
2015	Porsche Team Manthey	LMGTE Pro	Porsche 911 RSR	Porsche 4.0 L Flat-6	SIL; 7	SPA	LMS; Ret	NÜR; 2	COA; 2	FUJ; 2	SHA; 3	BHR; 1		6th	100
2017	Porsche GT Team	LMGTE Pro	Porsche 911 RSR	Porsche 4.0 L Flat-6	SIL	SPA	LMS; 3	NÜR	MEX	COA	FUJ	SHA	BHR	15th	30

=== Complete IMSA SportsCar Championship results ===
(key) (Races in bold indicate pole position; results in italics indicate fastest lap)

Year	Team	Class	Make	Engine	1	2	3	4	5	6	7	8	9	10	11	Pos.	Points	Ref
2014	Porsche North America	GTLM	Porsche 911 RSR	Porsche 4.0 L Flat-6	DAY; 1	SEB; 9	LBH	LGA	WGL; 5	MOS	IMS	ELK	VIR		**PET**; 5	16th	140	
2014	CORE Autosport	GTLM	Porsche 911 RSR	Porsche 4.0 L Flat-6										COA; 5		16th	140	
2015	Porsche North America	GTLM	Porsche 911 RSR	Porsche 4.0 L Flat-6	DAY; 5	SEB; 5	LBH; 4	LGA; 3	WGL; 6	**MOS**; 1	ELK; 1	**VIR**; 1	COA; 3	PET; 1		1st	315	
2016	Porsche North America	GTLM	Porsche 911 RSR	Porsche 4.0 L Flat-6	**DAY**; 8	SEB; 10	LBH; 1	LGA; 8	WGL; 9	MOS; 8	LIM; 6	ELK; 7	VIR; 6	COA; 2	PET; 10	8th	285	
2017	Porsche GT Team	GTLM	Porsche 911 RSR	Porsche 4.0 L Flat-6	DAY; 2	SEB; 7	LBH; 6	COA; 4	WGL; 7	**MOS**; 7	LIM; 1	ELK; 8	VIR; 8	LGA; 3	PET; 6	5th	295	
2018	Porsche GT Team	GTLM	Porsche 911 RSR	Porsche 4.0 L Flat-6	DAY; 8	SEB; 1	LBH; 6	MDO; 6	WGL; 3	**MOS**; 4	LIM; 5	ELK; 5	VIR; 8	LGA; 8	PET; 1	7th	299	
2019	Porsche GT Team	GTLM	Porsche 911 RSR	Porsche 4.0 L Flat-6	**DAY**; 5	**SEB**; 1	**LBH**; 5	MDO; 3	WGL; 1	MOS; 3	LIM; 4	ELK; 7	VIR; 1	LGA; 8	PET; 6	2nd	317	
2020	Pfaff Motorsports	GTD	Porsche 911 GT3 R	Porsche 4.0 L Flat-6	**DAY**; 13	DAY	SEB	ELK	VIR	ATL	MDO	CLT	PET	LGA	SEB	35th	44	
2022	KCMG	GTD Pro	Porsche 911 GT3 R	Porsche MA1.76/MDG.G 4.0 L Flat-6	DAY; 3	SEB	LBH	LGA	WGL	MOS	LIM	ELK	VIR	PET		24th	321	
2023	Pfaff Motorsports	GTD Pro	Porsche 911 GT3 R (992)	Porsche 4.2 L Flat-6	DAY; 5	SEB; 1	LBH; 3	MON; 3	WGL; 5	MOS; 2	LIM; 3	ELK; 4	VIR; 3	**IMS**; **4**	PET; 2	4th	3578	

Sporting positions
Preceded by Loïc Duval	Championnat de France Formule Renault 2.0 Champion; 2004	Succeeded by Romain Grosjean
Preceded by Anthony Beltoise	Porsche Carrera Cup France Champion; 2007	Succeeded by Anthony Beltoise
