= Flying Lizard Motorsports =

American racecar team

(United States) Flying Lizard Motorsports
- Founded: 2003
- Founder(s): Seth Neiman
- Base: Sonoma, California
- Team principal(s): Tommy Sadler, Thomas Blam, Darren Law
- Current series: GT America, GT World Challenge
- Former series: American Le Mans Series; Rolex Sports Car Series; United SportsCar Championship, GT4 America, Pirelli Trophy West USA, NASA, GT World Challenge Europe, Porsche Carrera Cup, Yokohama Drivers Cup
- Teams' Championships: 7 (2008, 2009, 2013, 2020x2, 2023x2)
- Drivers' Championships: 6 (2008, 2009, 2010, 2020x2, 2023)

The Flying Lizard Motorsports group is a motorsport team from Sonoma, California, formed by Seth Neiman in early 2003. The team competed in the full American Le Mans Series season, as well as the 24 Hours of Daytona, and the 24 Hours of Le Mans. The team went on to win six driver and team championships in the American Le Mans Series, becoming a Porsche factory team and Porsche Motorsport North America's development partner from 2007 to 2012. The team helped develop the first- and second-generation 997 GT3 RSR as well as bring it to victory several times in its six-year run in the series. The team solely raced Porsche cars from 2004 to 2019, becoming a staple in the Porsche racing community.

After ten years of ownership, Seth Neiman sold the team during the 2014 offseason to longtime Crew Chief Tommy Sadler, Chief Strategist Thomas Blam, and former Lizard driver Darren Law. Sadler stepped up to become Technical Director, Blam became Team Manager and Law Program Manager. No longer factory-backed or privately funded, the team became a customer racing effort, expanding to a variety of series and manufacturers.

To date, the team holds 14 professional team and driver championship titles as Flying Lizard Motorsport, four additional team and two driver titles managing K-PAX Racing in GT World Challenge America, and one team and one driver title managing TKO Motorsports.

== Racing history ==
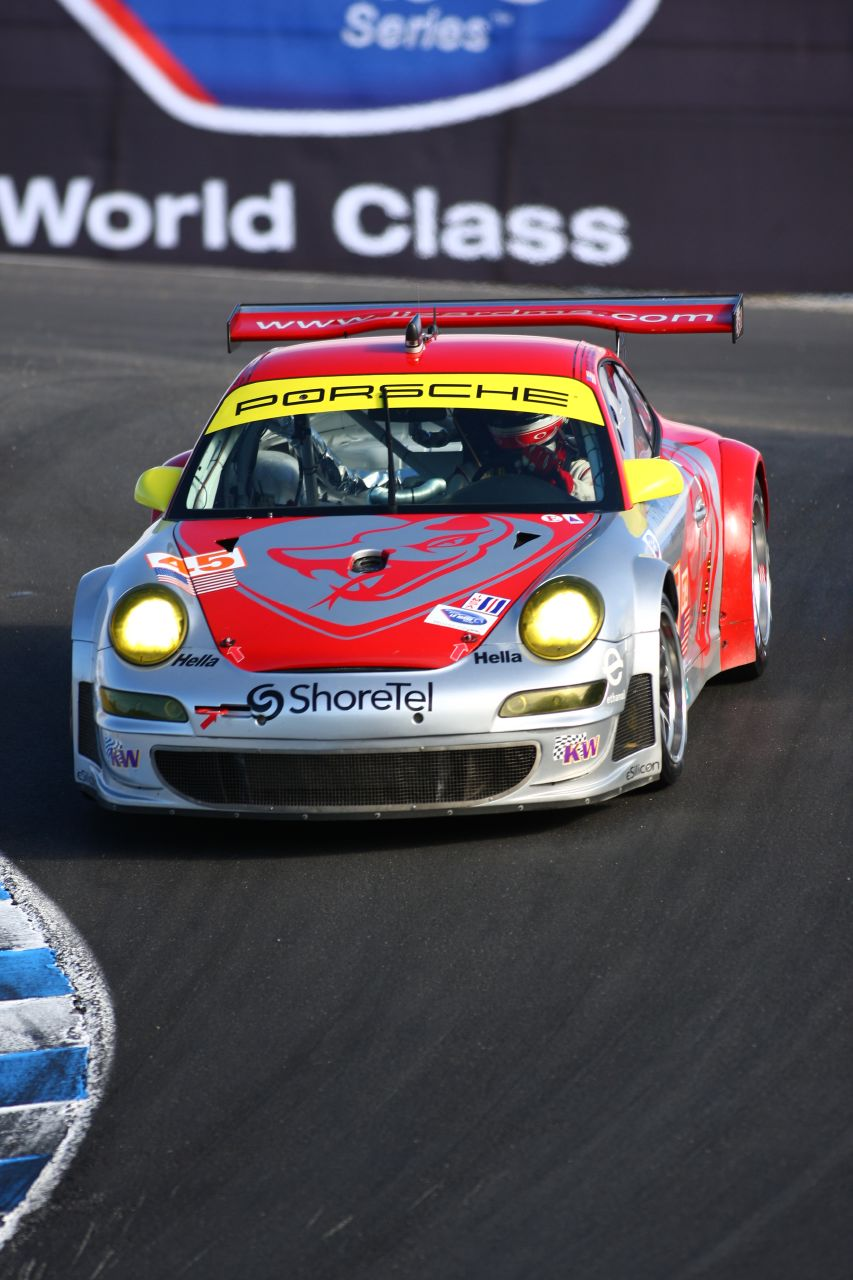
The #45 Flying Lizard Motorsports Porsche 911 GT3-RSR at Mazda Raceway Laguna Seca.

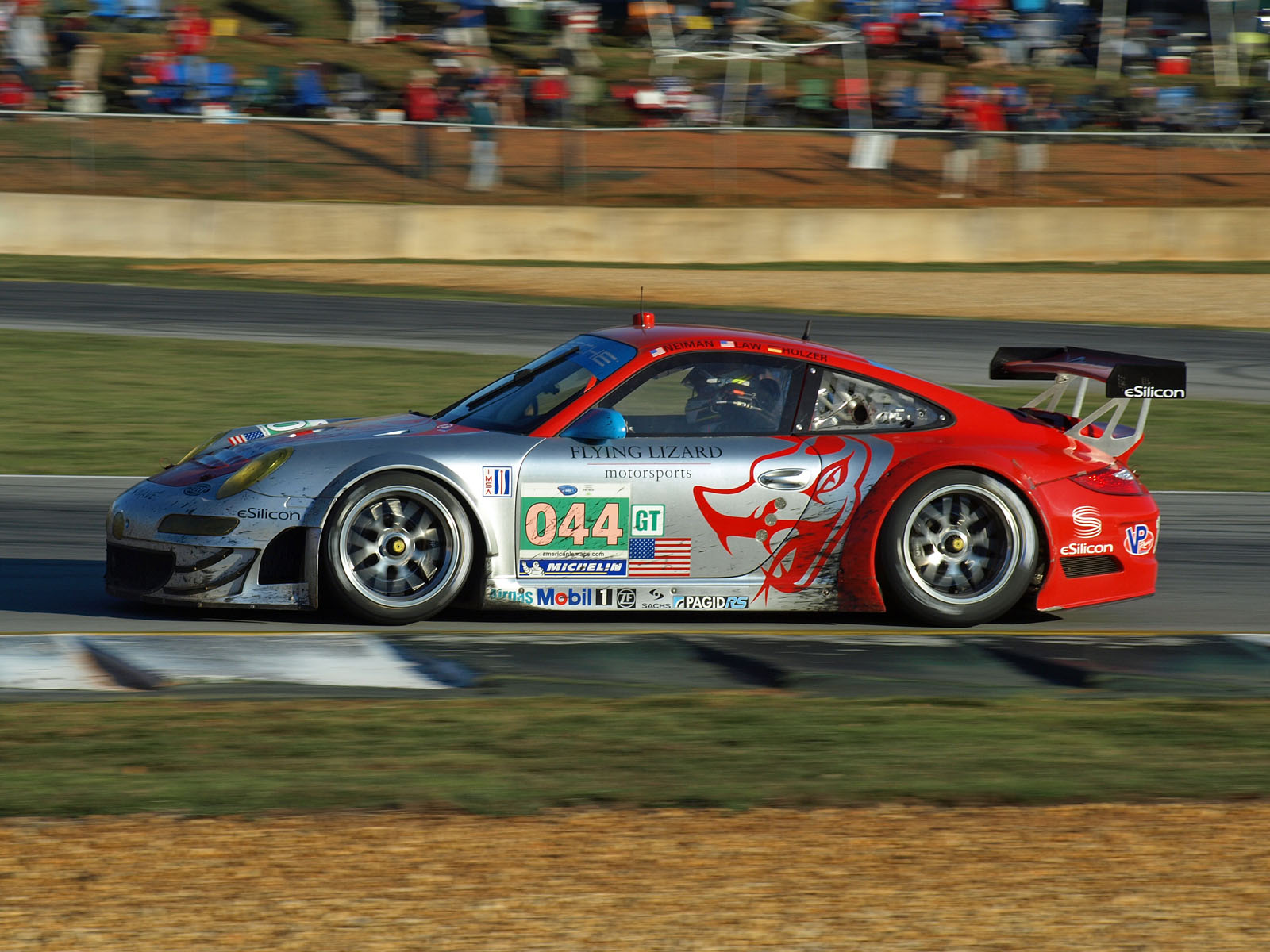
The #44 Flying Lizard Motorsports Porsche 911 GT3-RSRs at the 2011 Petit Le Mans.

=== Beginnings (2004-06) ===
The 2004 American Le Mans Series season saw Flying Lizard Motorsports and drivers Darren Law and Johannes van Overbeek finish 2nd in the GT2 team and drivers championship.

The livery was designed by Joseph Mikulas at Competition Graphics in Farmington Hills,MI. The designs were eventually taken over by Troy Lee Design once the team moved out of Michigan and to the west coast.

In 2005, the team finished 3rd in the ALMS GT2 Team Championship with drivers Johannes van Overbeek and Jon Fogarty finishing 5th in the GT2 drivers championship.

In 2006, the team finished 3rd in the GT2 team championship and driver Johannes van Overbeek finished 2nd in the drivers championship while his teammate, Wolf Henzler finished 4th.

=== ALMS Porsche Factory Support (2007-12) ===
For the 2007 season, the team took delivery of two brand new 997 Porsche 911 GT3 RSRs. Team also became Porsche Motorsport North America's development partner and received factory support from Porsche. Drivers Johannes van Overbeek and Jörg Bergmeister and the new addition of Marc Lieb shared duties of driving the #45 car, while Darren Law, Seth Neiman, and Lonnie Pechnik shared the #44 car. After the #45 car won three times in 2007, including the prestigious Petit Le Mans, the team would finish second in the team standings to the Risi Competizione team. Drivers Jörg Bermeister and Johannes van Overbeek would also finish second in the series driver standings.

For the 2008 season, the Flying Lizard team continued on in its fifth consecutive season in the GT2 class of the American Le Mans series. For this season, the team expanded into a three car operation with three Porsche 2008 911 GT3 RSRs. In the #45 car, previous season driver Jorg Bergmeister was joined by Wolf Henzler for the full season of competition with third driver Marc Lieb. Johannes van Overbeek and the new addition of Patrick Pilet piloted the team's #46 entry full-time with guest driver Richard Lietz. In the #44 entry, Darren Law and Seth Neiman with guest driver Alex Davison piloted the car. The #45 car of Bergmeister and Henzler was in tight contention with the Tafel Racing squad of Dominik Farnbacher and Dirk Müller, and at the end of the season emerged the overall points winners, giving Flying Lizard Motorsports their first-ever GT2 class championship.

For 2009, Flying Lizard Motorsports back moved to a two-car squad with the returning GT2 class champion #45 car being piloted by Jörg Bergmeister and Patrick Long for the majority of the races with Marc Lieb as the reserve third driver for longer races. The #44 car will be piloted by Seth Neiman and Darren Law for the majority of the races with Johannes van Overbeek as the reserve driver. After coming in 4th at the season opener at Sebring with a heavily damaged car, the #45 team took the class win in the following 5 races. At the following two races at Road America and Mosport they faced much tougher competition with a greatly improved Rahal Letterman Racing BMW team and a new Corvette Racing team. The #45 managed 3rd at Mosport and 4th at Road America but came back to claim first place in GT2 at the season finale in Monterey, California. Winning 6 out of 10 races, the #45 car won the GT2 team championship giving the team its second consecutive championship win. Jörg Bergmeister and Patrick Long also won the GT2 drivers championship.

For 2010, Flying Lizard Motorsports continued running two cars. The two-time GT2 championship-winning #45 car, driven by Jörg Bergmeister and Patrick Long with Marc Lieb as the reserve third driver, competed alongside its sister car, the #44, driven by Seth Neiman and Darren Law with Richard Lietz as the reserve third driver. The Lizards faced fierce competition from Rahal Letterman Lanigan Racing and Risi Competizione. After finishing 4th at the 12 hours of Sebring, the #45 car went on to take first place in its class at Long Beach, Laguna Seca, Lime Rock Park and Mosport. The Lizards placed second in the Team Championship and first in the Drivers Championship thanks to Jörg Bergmeister and Patrick Long. This gave Flying Lizard Motorsports and Bergmeister three consecutive Driver Championship titles.

For the 2011 season the team utilized the brand new second-generation 997 GT3 RSR. Both the #44 and #45 car were piloted by the same team as the year before, with the exception of Marco Holzer replacing Richard Lietz as reserve third driver in the #45 car. After finishing second in GT2 Championship the year before, Rahal Letterman Racing came back to fight even harder against the Flying Lizard Motorsports group. The #45 car managed a 2nd in class at Lime Rock, 1st in class at Laguna Seca and a 2nd in class finish at Petit Le Mans. The team managed a 3rd-place finish in the GT Season Championship while Jörg Bergmeister and Patrick Long finished 4th in the GT Drivers' Championship.

In 2012 the team took delivery of two brand new second-generation GT3 RSRs. This year's car has a front and rear track that has been widened by 1.9 inches allowing for much wider tires giving more grip. The Flying Lizard Motorsports team struggled to find speed and consistency with the new car. The #45 car managed a win at Lime Rock Park after a fierce battle with Corvette Racing and Extreme Speed Motorsports. The team also managed a win at Mosport but was disqualified after failing a stall test at the end of the race. The team finished 4th in the GT championship with Jörg Bergmeister and Patrick Long finishing 5th in the Drivers Championship points.

=== 2013 (ALMS Porsche GTC) ===
With the development of the 997 GT3 RSR ending, the team's relationship with Porsche Motorsport North America was discontinued. On November 15, 2012, Flying Lizard Motorsports announced that they would transition to competing in the GT Challenge category. The team fielded a two-car team for what would be the final season of the American Le Mans Series before it merged with the Rolex Sports Car Series to form the Tudor United SportsCar Championship in 2014. With the team winning four races of the ten-round season, including a victory at the season finale, Petit Le Mans, drivers of the #45 car, Spencer Pumpelly and Nelson Canache Jr, would finish second in the GTC drivers' championship behind the Alex Job Racing's Jeroen Bleekemolen and Cooper MacNeil and the team would claim its third ALMS Teams' Championship and their first in the GTC class.

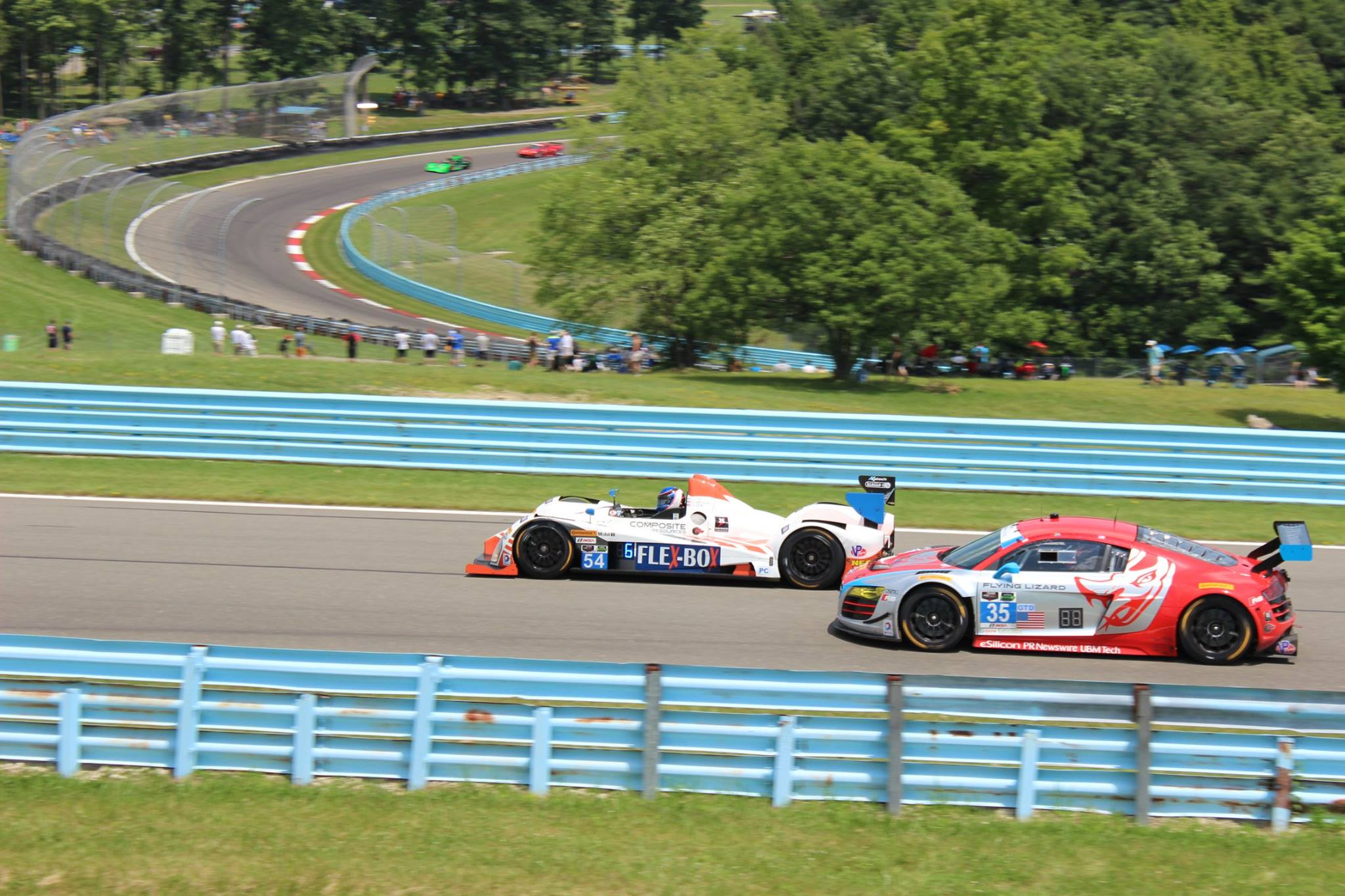
The #35 Flying Lizard Motorsports Audi R8 LMS at the 2014 6 Hours of Watkins Glen

=== IMSA Customer Program (2014-2015) ===
After competing with Porsches since its inception, the Flying Lizard team announced on November 11, 2013 that it would partner with Audi Sport Customer Racing to campaign a two car Audi R8 LMS effort in the newly formed Tudor United SportsCar Championship GT Daytona Class. Seth Neiman and Dion von Moltke would team in the #35 car Nelson Canache Jr. and Spencer Pumpelly sharing the #45 car. The season began with a last lap battle at the 24 Hours of Daytona, resulting in the first-place finishing car to receive a penalty for intent for avoidable contact, awarding Flying Lizard as the winners. Five hours later, the penalty was revoked, moving the Lizard squad to second place. The team finished out the season with four top-five finishes.

For 2015, the team announced they would run a partial season in United SportsCar, in addition to running a full season in Pirelli World Challenge and Porsche Cup of America. The team ran five races with the Audi R8 LMS throughout the season: the 24 Hours of Daytona, the 12 Hours of Sebring, the Monterey Grand Prix, Lone Star Le Mans and Petit Le Mans. The 2015 drivers included: Tomonobu Fujii, Satoshi Hoshino, Robert Thorne, Markus Winkelhock, Colin Thompson, Marco Holzer, Guy Cosmo, Patrick Byrne, Mike Vess and Jason Hart. The team's highlight of the season included a top-5 finish at Petit Le Mans, which was canceled with only 7 hours and 51 minutes of the 10-hour race completed.

=== Pirelli World Challenge (since 2015) ===
==== GT: K-PAX Racing (since 2015) ====
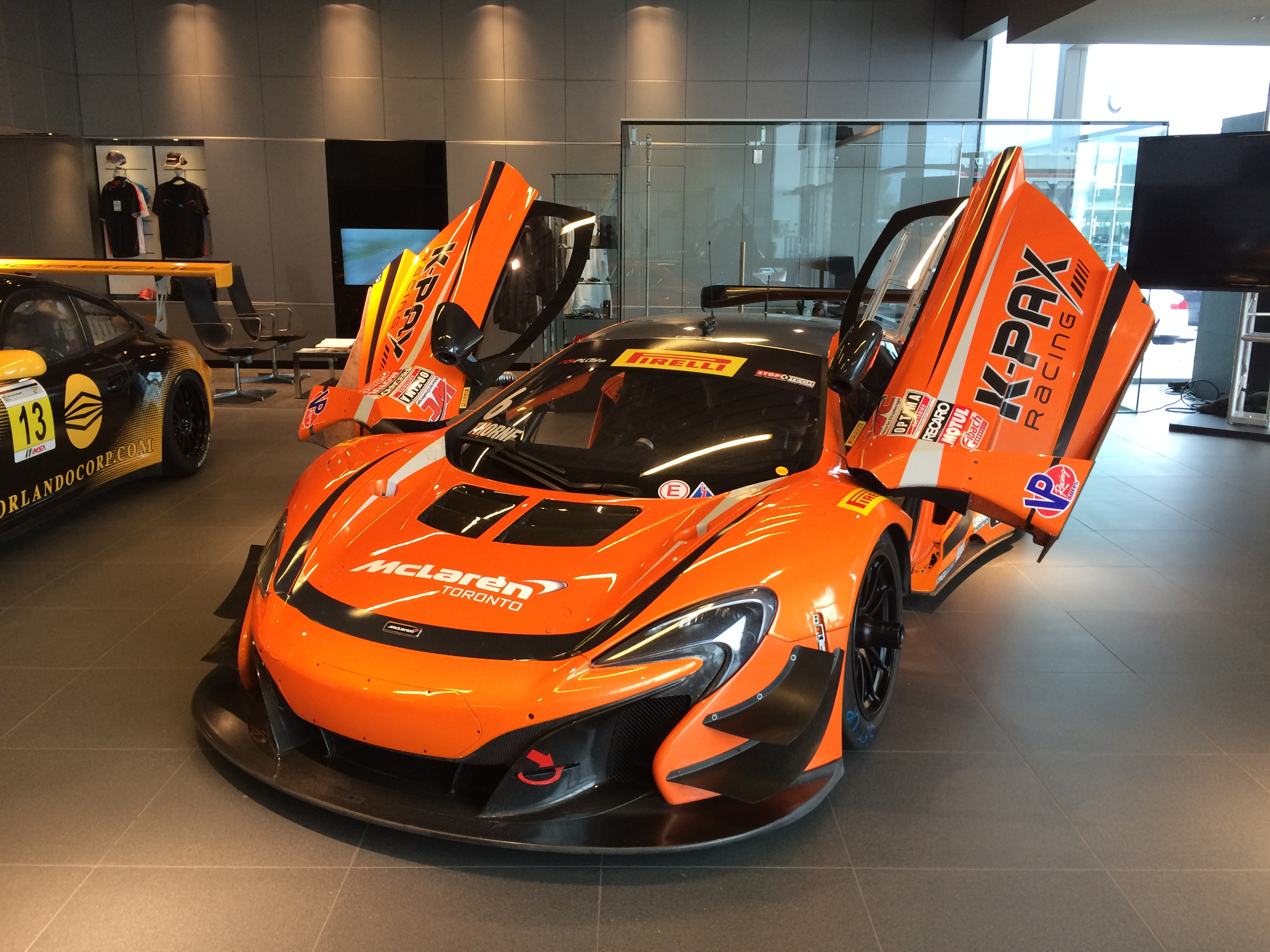
K-PAX Racing with Flying Lizard Motorsports McLaren 650S GT3 of Robert Thorne

Flying Lizard partnered with championship winning team K-PAX Racing in 2015 to enter two McLaren 650S GT3s for a full season in the Pirelli World Challenge GT championship. With McLaren GT factory driver Kevin Estre and K-PAX veteran Robert Thorne, the unified effort had a successful first season, earning four wins and 8 podiums. Estre proved to be a front runner, winning Round 2 at Circuit of the Americas by over 30 seconds in torrential downpour, establishing himself early as a championship contender.

Flying Lizard returned to manage the K-PAX program, solely under the K-PAX Racing banner, in 2016 with Alvaro Parente, Austin Cindric, and Colin Thompson, racing three McLarens. Parente clinched the driver championship, while young Austin Cindric earned three podiums and three pole positions. In all, the full-season program clinched the team, driver (Alvaro Parente), and manufacturer (McLaren GT) championships, with 16 top five finishes, 12 podiums, seven pole positions, and six wins. The team closed out the season with a return to endurance racing, a first for K-PAX Racing, running the 12 Hours of Sepang with Shane van Gisbergen, Côme Ledogar, and Álvaro Parente. The #9 650S GT3 finished tenth overall, seventh in class.

The championship-winning duo returned again in 2017 under the K-PAX Racing banner, with returning champion Alvaro Parente being joined by full-season entry Bryan Sellers and partial season entrant Mike Hedlund. The GT championship also introduced a new SprintX format, where two drivers would share a car for an allotment of races. Ben Barnicoat joined Parente in the No. 9 McLaren, and Jonny Kane raced with Sellers for the first few races. Michael Lewis joined Mike Hedlund, but then switched to the car of Sellers after Hedlund pulled out of the championship. The team finished runner up in the Sprint championship, earning a total of five wins and ten podiums.

For 2018, the operation switched manufacturers, dropping McLaren for Bentley. The Pirelli World Challenge championship was comprised 10 events, five of which two-driver SprintX races. Parente returned for a third year, joined by Flying Lizard alumni Rodrigo Baptista. The pair were joined by Bentley works team drivers Andy Soucek and Maxime Soulet for the SprintX Races. The team celebrated ten victories, rebounding from heavy crashes at St. Petersburg and VIRginia International Raceway early in the season.

The partnership continued in 2019, as the series changed from the Pirelli World Challenge to the SRO America-led Blancpain GT World Challenge America. The series format changed to two 90-minute races each weekend, with two drivers per car. Alvaro Parente and Any Soucek returned as co-drivers, and Rodrigo Baptista raced alongside Maxime Soulet. Together, the Bentley squad earned six wins and 23 podiums, clinching the team championship and finishing in second and third in the driver standings.

In 2020, the team only completed one race in the GT World Challenge America championship, entering Patrick Byrne and Guy Cosmo in a one-off at the Circuit of the Americas doubleheader. The team also expanded their footprint to race overseas in the GT World Challenge Europe championship, entering two Bentleys into the competition with drivers Alvaro Parente, Andy Soucek, Jordan Pepper, Rodrigo Baptista, Maxime Soulet, Jules Gounon, and Alex Buncombe. The best finish of the season was a sixth in class.

The program switched up for 2021, coming back to the United States to race a pair of Lamborghini Huracan GT3 cars with Andrea Caldarelli, Jordan Pepper, Corey Lewis, and Giovanni Venturini. With only one DNF, the program swept the championships, finishing first and second in the driver categories, and taking the 2021 pro team title before the season finale.

==== GT America/GT4 America: Flying Lizard Motorsports (since 2016) ====
In 2016, the Lizard group began its own customer racing program in World Challenge, fielding entries at Road America, Sonoma Raceway, and Laguna Seca with Andy Wilzoch and Mike Hedlund. Helund earned two third-place finishes in both of his Sonoma Raceway races, and Wilzoch also earned a double podium at Road America. Program Manager Darren Law joined Wilzoch at Laguna Seca for the first SprintX doubleheader, and the pair finished ninth and fourth.

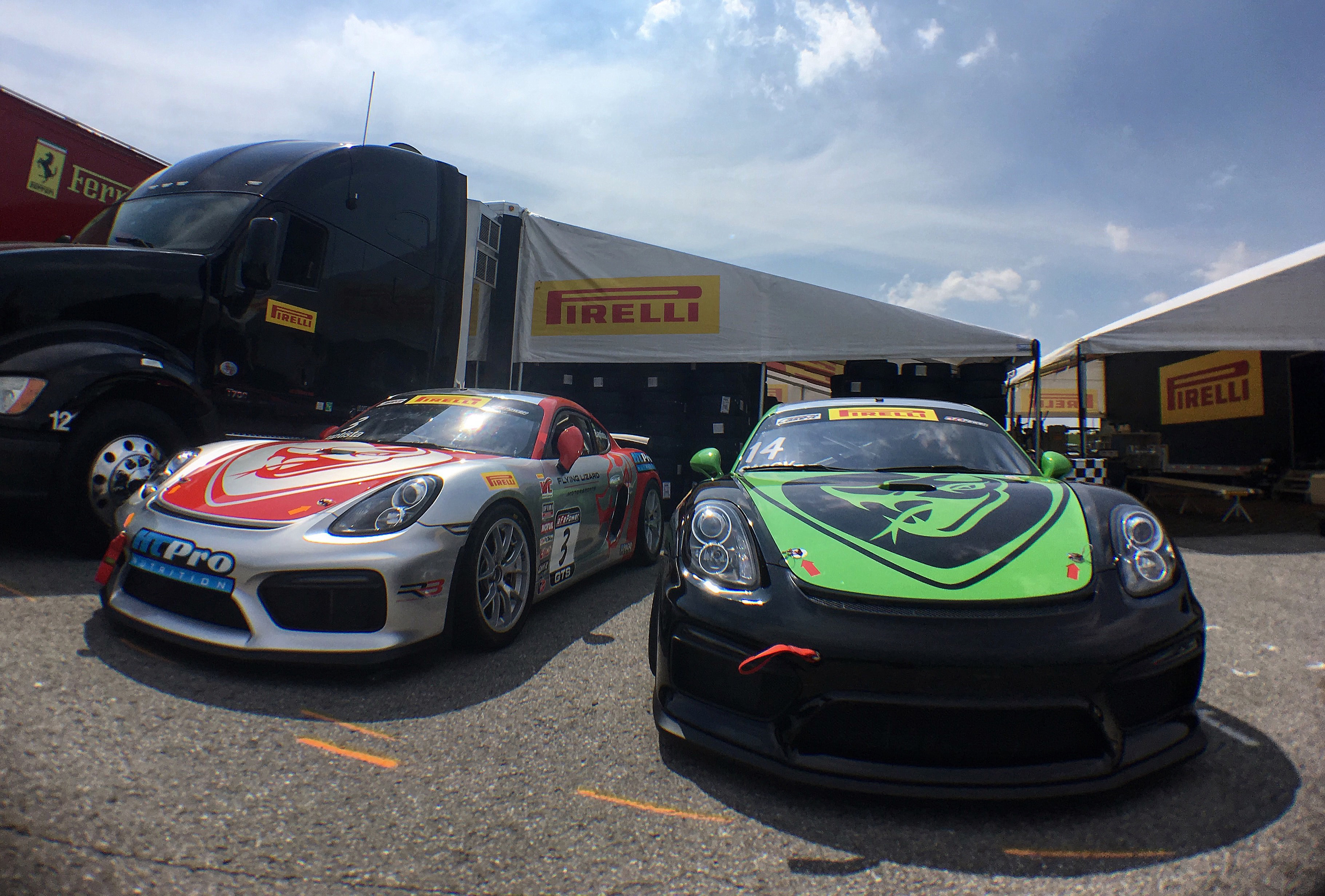
The 2017 Flying Lizard Motorsports Porsches of Rodrigo Baptista and Nate Stacy

The following season, the program expanded, fielding a pair of Flying Lizard Porsche Cayman GT4 Clubsport MR for Brazilian Rodrigo Baptista and Nate Stacy. Baptista proved to be one of the breakout rookies of the season, earning four wins, including a sweep at Lime Rock Park, a track the Lizard program always showed success at. Together, the pair earned ten podiums and 17 top-five finishes.

World Challenge introduced the SprintX Championship to the GTS class in 2018, allowing AM drivers to have a co-driver for each doubleheader race weekend. Mike Hedlund returned to Flying Lizard to race his Audi R8 LMS GT4 solo, while Adam Merzon and Ryan Eversley shared the driving duties for the No. 23 Audi R8 LMS. Hedlund earned six podiums during the season and one win at the Watkins Glen season finale. Merzon and Eversley clinched their first pole position as a pair at Lime Rock Park.

New racer Michael Dinan joined Flying Lizard Motorsports for the 2019 season in the series, rebranded as GT4 America under the SRO Motorsports banner. Racing the new Porsche 718 Cayman GT4 Clubsport, Dinan signed up for both the Sprint and SprintX championships for a total of 31 races, bringing IMSA racer Robby Foley as his co-driver for the SX events. The new series got off to a rough start for the American racer, who was sidelined for three events following an incident at VIRginia International Raceway. Things turned around in the second half of the season, and Dinan with Foley earned seven top-five finishes and a podium finish before year's end.

Flying Lizard remained in the GT4 America Sprint and SprintX championship for 2022, running a pair of Aston Martin Vantage GT4 cars with returning drivers Dinan and Foley, with Erin Vogel and Michael Cooper running a McLaren 570S GT4 in the SprintX series. The COVID-19 pandemic arrived as the series began the season at Circuit of the Americas in March, and the previously-announced schedule changed as all events were postponed until July. Each series then moved from a standard double-header format to triple headers for four of the five remaining events. While the McLaren failed to be a competitive machine for the majority of the season, Dinan's Sprint and his SprintX effort with Robby Foley showed strong success from the previous season, earning 21 podiums and 17 victories. Flying Lizard also celebrated their 100th podium at the season opener, following three podiums earned in the weekend.

With the newly formed GT America series in the SRO America offerings, Flying Lizard entered two cars into partial seasons in 2021. Longtime customer Andy Wilzoch raced a Porsche 911 GT3 R, earning four wins and eight podiums in twelve races in the Masters class. Partnering with TKO Motorsports with their Bentley Continental GT3, the team ran a second effort with Memo Gidley in the SRO3 class, earning two wins and an additional three podiums.

The 2022 season saw Elias Sabo join the team, bringing with him a pair of Aston Martin Vantage GT4 cars. He entered into a full season in GT4 America, racing with co-driver Andy Lee in the 60-minute sprint races, then ran solo in the GT America series, in the GT4 class. In GT4 America, he and Lee finished in third place, with one win and eight podiums.

Sabo returned for a second season in 2023, again running in GT4 America with Andy Lee, and then in the bronze-only, single-driver sprint series, GT America. Jason Bell joined the program, racing the full season in GT America, then also running select GT4 races with Michael Cooper, running an Aston Martin Vantage GT4. Flying Lizard Motorsports earned five wins and 21 podium finishes in GT America, claiming the team and driver championship titles. In GT4 America, the team swept the championship title as well, with three wins and seven top-five finishes.

=== Lamborghini Super Trofeo North America (since 2022) ===
Flying Lizard Motorsport returned to the IMSA sphere in 2022, joining the Lamborghini Super Trofeo North America series, a single-make championship running in support of the IMSA WeatherTech SportsCar Championship. The team started the year with a three-car entry, with Slade Stewart (LB Cup), Tom Tait (Am), and Brett Jacobson and Joel Miller (Pro/Am). Slade Stewart's pink unicorn Lamborghini named "Sparklefarts" won Stewart the driver title, while the team celebrated four wins and eight podium finishes.

The following season, the team expanded to four cars, with Stewart returning to race with Andy Lee in the Pro/Am class, Tom Tait in the Am class, joined by Chris Bellomo and former Lizard driver Johannes van Overbeek in one Pro/Am entry, and Paul Nemschoff and Marc Miller rounding out the group.

=== Development programs ===
==== Toyo Tires (2015-2019) ====
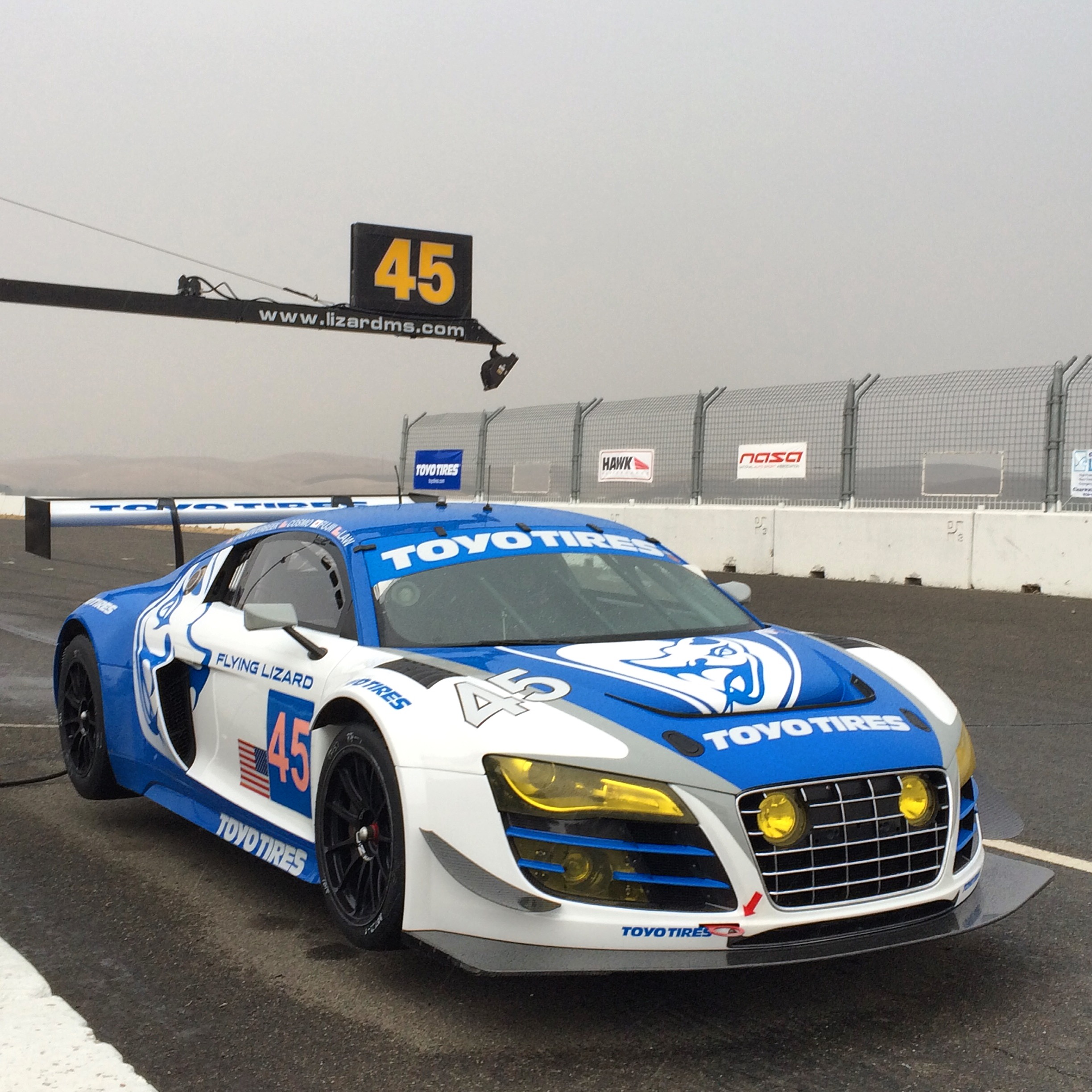
The 2015 25 Hours of Thunderhill race-winning Flying Lizard Motorsports Audi R8

Flying Lizard Motorsports and Toyo Tires began their partnership in 2015 as a tire development program, with the tire manufacturer utilizing the sports car champions for private testing. In 2015, the duo put their development to the test, entering the Auri R8 LMS that had previously raced in the IMSA series. The #45 Audi R8 LMS won in the ES class and overall, with the all-professional driver lineup of Program Manager Darren Law, Tomonobu Fuji, Guy Cosmo and Johannes van Overbeek.

The #45 Audi returned to defend its win the following year, with drivers Darren Law, Mike Hedlund, Johannes van Overbeek and Dion von Moltke. The Audi again finished first in the ES class and first overall. A second entry, a #74 Porsche 911 GT3 RSR joined the effort, finishing second in the ES class and third overall with drivers Charlie Hayes, Andy Wilzoch, Will Owen, and Tommy Sadler.

In 2017, Flying Lizard and Toyo Tires achieved a three-peat, with the No. 45 Audi R8 LMS again taking the ES class and overall win from pole position. Darren Law, Tom Haacker, Nate Stacy, and Charlie Hayes drove the car to victory, completing over 2,100 miles. The #74 Porsche Cayman GT4 Clubsport of Johannes van Overbeek, Craig Watkins, Mike Hedlund, and Ross Thompson also clinched its own class win. The team also beat the all-time record of 761 laps completed during the race by completing 780 laps.

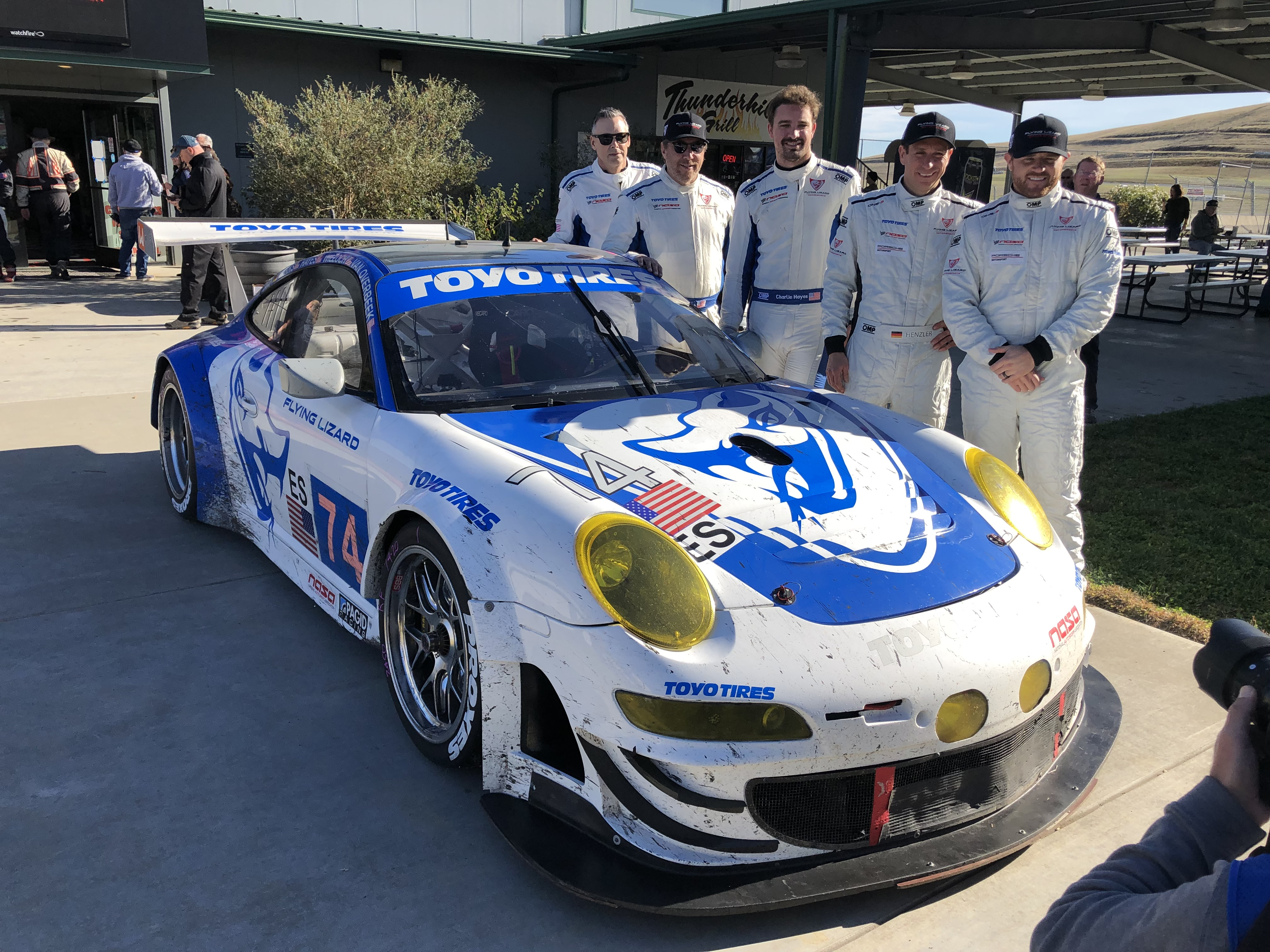
The 2018 25 Hours of Thunderhill race-winning Porsche and drivers

The team returned with a two car effort in 2018, winning overall for the fourth consecutive year, with the #74 Porsche 911 GT3 RSR of Johannes van Overbeek, Justin Marks, Andy Wilzoch, Charlie Hayes, and Wolf Henzler. van Overbeek started from fifth and brought the car up to second in the opening lap, but within minutes, the Porsche was back in the garage for 14 laps, needing repairs on a broken axle. By Henzler's stint, the car had made it back into the top three, but again suffered a broken axle. In lap 596, van Overbeek brought the car back to the lead, and after 25 hours again finished first overall, officially becoming the team to hold the most wins at the endurance event. The second of two all-female entries on the grid, the #45 Jester & Babbitt Racing by Flying Lizard Motorsports Toyo Tires Audi R8 LMS GT4 was raced by the first-ever female drivers of the team: Christina Nielsen, Aurora Straus, Ashton Harrison, Laura Ely, and Erin Vogel. The all-female car clinched its Toyo Tires GT4 Challenge class win, finishing fourth overall after running a near-flawless race and suffering no mechanical issues.

In 2018, the duo of Toyo Tires and Flying Lizard Motorsports took on a new challenge: the Pikes Peak International Hill Climb. The team enlisted Clint Vahsholtz, a driver with the most class victories in the history of the race, to run the No. 45 Flying Lizard / Toyo Tires McLaren 12C GT3. Of 77 entries, the team finished eighth overall and second in class on their debut of the 12.42-mile, 156 turn course, with over 9,000 feet in elevation changes from start to finish.

==== Lamborghini Super Trofeo (2019) ====
In spring of 2019, Flying Lizard Motorsports and Lamborghini Squadra Corse announced a new partnership, in which the Lizards took ownership of a Lamborghini Huracán Super Trofeo Evo, opening a new test program at their home track of Sonoma Raceway. Based on the customer interest in the new car, the program was built around research and development of the car and allowing prospective racers in the IMSA Super Trofeo series to get seat time in the machinery.

== Results ==
=== American Le Mans Series ===
Year	Car	Primary Drivers	Class	1	2	3	4	5	6	7	8	9	10	Driver Rank	Driver Points	Team Rank	Team Points
2009	#44 Porsche 997 GT3 RSR	Seth Neiman; Darren Law	GT2	SEB; 5	STP; 5	LBH; 5	UTA; 6	LRP; 7	MOH; 9	ELK; 8	MOS; 7	PET; 7	LAG; 5	SN: 12th DL: 15th	SN: 76 DL: 57	1st	181
2009	#45 Porsche 997 GT3 RSR	Jorg Bergmeister; Pat Long	GT2	SEB; 4	STP; 1	LBH; 1	UTA; 1	LRP; 1	MOH; 4	ELK; 5	MOS; 5	PET; 5	LAG; 1	1st	181	1st	181
2010	#44 Porsche 997 GT3 RSR	Seth Neiman; Darren Law	GT	SEB; 5	LBH; 12	LAG; 11	UTA; 11	LRP; 7	MOH; 7	ELK; 9	MOS; 9	PET; 9		SN: 15th DL: 18th	SN: 43 DL: 39	2nd	157
2010	#45 Porsche 997 GT3 RSR	Jorg Bergmeister; Pat Long	GT	SEB; 4	LBH; 1	LAG; 1	UTA; 5	LRP; 1	MOH; 4	ELK; 2	MOS; 1	PET; 4		1st	157	2nd	157
2011	#44 Porsche 997 GT3 RSR	Seth Neiman; Marco Holzer; Darren Law	GT	SEB; 7	LBH; 8	LRP; 7	MOS; 8	MOH; 10	ELK; 9	BAL; 8	LAG; 9	PET; 8		SN: 8th MH: 10th DL: 14th	SN: 60 MH: 53 DL: 39	3rd	115
2011	#45 Porsche 997 GT3 RSR	Jorg Bergmeister; Pat Long	GT	SEB; 6	LBH; 13	LRP; 2	MOS; 12	MOH; 9	ELK; 4	BAL; 11	LAG; 1	PET; 2		4th	106	3rd	115
2012	#44 Porsche 997 GT3 RSR	Seth Neiman; Marco Holzer	GT	SEB; 6	LBH; 9	LAG; 9	LRP; 9	MOS; 9	MOH; 7	ELK; 8	BAL; 7	VIR; 7	PET; 4	SN: 10th MH: 11th	SN: 53 MH:46	4th	122
2012	#45 Porsche 997 GT3 RSR	Jorg Bergmeister; Pat Long	GT	SEB; 10	LBH; 7	LAG; 6	LRP; 1	MOS; 11	MOH; 2	ELK; 2	BAL; 5	VIR; 2	PET; 5	5th	111	4th	122
2013	#44 Porsche 997 GT3 Cup	Seth Neiman; Dion von Moltke	GTC	SEB; 9	LBH; 3	LAG; 9	LRP; 6	MOS; 7	ELK; 5	BAL; 1	AUS; 7	VIR; 5	PET; 5	DvM: 9th SN: 12th	DvM: 81 SN 34	1st	157
2013	#45 Porsche 997 GT3 Cup	Spencer Pumpelly; Nelson Canache	GTC	SEB; 2	LBH; 2	LAG; 8	LRP; 1	MOS; 2	ELK; 1	BAL; 7	AUS; 5	VIR; 7	PET; 1	2nd	139	1st	157

=== United SportsCar Championship ===
Year	Car	Primary Drivers	Class	1	2	3	4	5	6	7	8	9	10	11	Rank	Points
2014	#35 Audi R8 LMS	Seth Neiman; Dion von Moltke	GTD	DIS; 5	SEB; 5	LAG; 5	DET; 13	WGI; 7	MOS; 14	IND; 13	ELK; 8	VIR; 7	AUS; 13	PET; 12	9th	252
2014	#45 Audi R8 LMS	Spencer Pumpelly; Nelson Canache	GTD	DIS; 2	SEB; 8	LAG; 6	DET; 14	WGI; 14	MOS; 10	LRP; 8	ELK; 7	VIR; 16	AUS; 7	PET; 14	10th	249
2015	#45 Audi R8 LMS	Various	GTD	DIS; 10	SEB; 14	LAG; 9	DET -	WGI -	MOS -	LRP -	ELK -	VIR -	AUS; 11	PET; 5	13th	73

=== SRO America (formally Pirelli World Challenge) ===
==== GT with K-PAX Racing ====
Year	Team name	Car	Driver	Class	1	2	3	4	5	6	7	8	9	10	11	12	13	14	15	16	17	18	19	20	Rank	Points
2015	K-PAX Racing with Flying Lizard Motorsports	#6 McLaren 650S GT3	Robert Thorne	GT	AUS; 19	AUS; 10	STP; 24	STP; 22	LGH; 24	ALA; 13	ALA; 2	MOS; 6	MOS; 25	DET; 6	ELK; 14	ELK; 22	ELK; 27	MOH; 25	MOH; 20	UTA -	UTA -	SNM; 24	SNM; 4	LAG; 16	16th	781
2015	K-PAX Racing with Flying Lizard Motorsports	#9 McLaren 650S GT3	Kévin Estre	GT	AUS; 4	AUS; 1	STP; 5	STP; 3	LGBP; 26	ALA; 29	ALA; 1	MOS; 2	MOS; 6	DET; 1	ELK; 20	ELK; 23	ELK; 20	MOH; 6	MOH; 6	UTA -	UTA -	SNM; 1	SNM; 2	LAG; 13	5th	1426
2016	K-PAX Racing	#9 McLaren 650S GT3	Álvaro Parente	GT	AUS; 6	AUS; 7	STP; 2	STP; 16	LGBP; 1	ALA; 1	ALA; 2	MOS; 8	MOS; 6	LRP; 1	LRP; 1	ELK; 6	ELK; 6	MOH; 1	MOH; 14	UTA; 18	UTA; 11	SNM; 4	SNM; 2	LAG; 1	1st	1657
2016	K-PAX Racing	#6 McLaren 650S GT3	Austin Cindric	GT	AUS; 12	AUS; 14	STP; 5	STP; 17	LBH; 16	ALA; 14	ALA; 14	MOS; 9	MOS; 7	LRP; 13	LRP; 8	ELK; 9	ELK; 16	MOH; 2	MOH; 18	UTA; 6	UTA; 12	SNM; 2	SNM; 3	LAG; 18	8th	1198
2016	K-PAX Racing	#13 McLaren 650S GT3	Colin Thompson	GT	AUS; 9	AUS; 4	STP; 16	STP; 8	LBH; 16	ALA; 22	ALA; DNS	MOS; 14	MOS; 14	LRP; 11	LRP; 11	ELK; 18	ELK; 8	MOH; DNF	MOH; DNS	UTA; 5	UTA; 7	SNM; 29	SNM; 9	LAG; 19	15th	806
2017	K-PAX Racing	#9 McLaren 650S GT3	Álvaro Parente (SprintX: with Ben Barnicoat)	GT	STP; 1	STP; 4	LBH; 1	VIR-X; 13	VIR-X; 2	MOS-X; 11	LRP-X; 3	LRP-X; 3	ELK; 6	ELK; 6	MOH; 1	MOH; 1	UTA-X; 6	UTA-X; 4	AUS-X; 10	AUS-X; 4	AUS-X; 4	SNM; 2			3rd	315
2017	K-PAX Racing	#6 McLaren 650S GT3	Bryan Sellers (SprintX: with Jonny Kane/Michael Lewis)	GT	STP; 5	STP; 8	LBH; 3	VIR-X; 10	VIR-X; 11	MOS-X; 7	LRP-X; 6	LRP-X; 6	ELK; 9	ELK; 10	MOH; 4	MOH; 10	UTA-X; 5	UTA-X; 6	AUS-X; 8	AUS-X; 11	AUS-X; 5	SNM; 10	SNM; 4		7th	244
2017	K-PAX Racing	#98 McLaren 650S GT3	Mike Hedlund (SprintX: with Michael Lewis)	GTA	STP; 4	STP; 3	LBH -	VIR-X; 5	VIR-X; 5	MOS-X; 6	LRP-X; 9	LRP-X; 6	ELK -	ELK -	MOH -	MOH -	UTA-X -	UTA-X -	AUS-X -	AUS-X -	AUS-X -	SNM -			49th	15
2018	K-PAX Racing	No. 9 Bentley Continental GT3	Álvaro Parente (SprintX: with Andy Soucek)	GT Pro	STP; DNF	STP; 6	AUS-X; 6	AUS-X; 6	LBH; 3	VIR-X; 8	VIR-X; DNS	MOS-X; 6	MOS-X; 1	LRP-X; 4	LRP-X; 2	ELK; 1	ELK; 2	POR-X; DNF	POR-X; DNS	UTA-X; DNF	UTA-X; 5	WGI; 8	WGI; 3		4th 11th (SX)	156; 71 (SX)
2018	K-PAX Racing	No. 3 Bentley Continental GT3	Rodrigo Baptista (SprintX: with Maxime Soulet)	GT Pro	STP; 6	STP; 5	AUS-X; 5	AUS-X; 5	LBH; 5	VIR-X; 1	VIR-X; 5	MOS-X; 7	MOS-X; 2	LRP-X; 6	LRP-X; 5	ELK; 7	ELK; 6	POR-X; 5	POR-X; 1	UTA-X; 5	UTA-X; 4	WGI; 1	WGI; 1		155; 137(SX)	5th 4th (SX)
2019	K-PAX Racing	No. 9 Bentley Continental GT3	Álvaro Parente& Andy Soucek	Pro	AUS; 2	AUS; 4	VIR; 1	VIR; DNF	MOS; 2	MOS; 1	SON; 3	SON; 3	WGI; 2	WGI; 2	ELK; 9	ELK; 3	LAS; 2	LAS; 2							2nd	237
2019	K-PAX Racing	No. 3 Bentley Continental GT3	Rodrigo Baptista & Maxime Soulet	Pro	AUS; 1	AUS; 2	VIR; DNF	VIR; 1	MOS; 3	MOS; 3	SON; 2	SON; 11	WGI; 3	WGI; 3	ELK; 6	ELK; 4	LAS; 3	LAS; 2							3rd	195
2020	K-PAX Racing	No. 8 Bentley Continental GT3	Patrick Byrne & Guy Cosmo	AUS; 3	AUS; 10	VIR -	VIR -	SNM -	SNM -	ELK -	ELK -	AUS -	AUS -	IMS -												
2021	K-PAX Racing	No. 3 Lamborghini Huracan GT3	Andrea Caldarelli & Jordan Pepper	SON; 1	SON; 1	AUS; 1	AUS; 2	VIR; 1	VIR; 13	ELK; 1	ELK; 4	WGI; 1	WGI; 1	SEB; 1	SEB; 1	IMS -									1st	270
2021	K-PAX Racing	No. 6 Lamborghini Huracan GT3	Corey Lewis & Giovanni Venturini	SON; 2	SON; 2	AUS; 6	AUS; 1	VIR; DNF	VIR; 2	ELK; 4	ELK; 2	WGI; 6	WGI; 2	SEB; 5	SEB; 3	IMS -									2nd	234

==== GTA/GTCup/GTS/GTSA ====
Year	Car	Driver	Class	1	2	3	4	5	6	7	8	9	10	11	12	13	14	15	16	17	18	19	Rank	Points
2016	#45 Porsche 911 GT3R	Andy Wilzoch (with Darren Law: SprintX)	GTA	AUS -	AUS -	STP -	STP -	LBH -	ALA -	ALA -	MOS -	MOS -	DET -	ELK; 3	ELK; 3	MOH -	MOH -	UTA -	UTA -	SNM; 5	SNM; 6	LAG-X; 4	7th	420
2016	#35 Porsche 911 GT3 Cup	Mike Hedlund	GT Cup	AUS -	AUS -	STP -	STP -	LBH -	ALA -	ALA -	MOS -	MOS -	DET -	ELK -	ELK -	MOH -	MOH -	UTA -	UTA -	SNM; 3	SNM; 3	LAG-X -	9th	180
2017	#3 Porsche Cayman GT4 Clubsport MR	Rodrigo Baptista	GTS	STP; 4	STP; 5	VIR; 5	VIR; DNF	MOS; 8	MOS; 6	LRP; 1	LRP; 1	ELK; 5	ELK; 9	MOH; DNF	MOH; 9	UTA; 1	UTA; 7	AUS; 3	AUS; 1	SNM; 4	SNM; 3		4th	257
2017	#14 Porsche Cayman GT4 Clubsport MR	Nate Stacy	GTS	STP; 5	STP; 6	VIR; 8	VIR; DNF	MOS; 7	MOS; 7	LRP; 3	LRP; 3	ELK; 8	ELK; 3	MOH; 5	MOH; 8	UTA; 6	UTA; 3	AUS; 9	AUS; 8	SNM; 6	SNM; 4		5th	252
2018	#45 Audi R8 LMS GT4	Mike Hedlund	GTSA	STP; 2	STP; 4	AUS-X; DNF	AUS-X; 3	VIR; 5	VIR; 2	MOS-X; 4	MOS-X; 7	LRP-X; 6	LRP-X; 14	ELK; 16	ELK; 2	POR; 3	POR; 11	UTA-X -	UTA-X -	WGI; 12	WGI; 1		4th	257
2018	#45 Audi R8 LMS GT4	Michael Dinan and Robby Foley (SprintX)	GTSA	STP -	STP -	AUS-X -	AUS-X -	VIR -	VIR -	MOS-X -	MOS-X -	LRP-X -	LRP-X -	ELK -	ELK -	POR -	POR -	UTA-X; 10	UTA-X; 13	WGI -	WGI -			
2018	#23 Audi R8 LMS GT4	Adam Merzon (with Ryan Eversley: SprintX)	GTSA	STP; 9	STP; 12	AUS-X; 13	AUS-X; 8	VIR; 13	VIR; 14	MOS-X; 13	MOS-X; DNF	LRP-X; 8	LRP-X; 9	ELK; 13	ELK; 10	POR -	POR -	UTA-X; 15	UTA-X; 11	WGI; 11	WGI -		12th (AM); 53rd (RE)	35 (AM); 14 (RE)
2018	No. 46 Porsche 911 GT3 R	Andy Wilzoch	GTA	STP -	STP -	AUS-X -	AUS-X -	VIR -	VIR -	MOS-X -	MOS-X -	LRP-X -	LRP-X -	ELK; 6	ELK; 6	POR -	POR -	UTA-X -	UTA-X -	WGI -	WGI -			

==== GT4 America ====
Year	Car	Driver	Class	1	2	3	4	5	6	7	8	9	10	11	12	13	14	15	16	Rank	Points
2019	No. 21 Porsche 718 Cayman GT4 Clubsport	Michael Dinan	Sprint Am	STP; 7	STP; DNF	LBGP; DNF	VIR; DNF	VIR; DNS	MOS -	MOS -	SON -	SON -	WGI; 11	WGI; 8	ELK; 6	ELK; 4	LAS; 5	LAS; 6		26th	1
2019	No. 210 Porsche 718 Cayman GT4 Clubsport	Michael Dinan and Robby Foley	SprintX Pro/Am	AUS; 3	AUS; 2	VIR; DNF	VIR; DNS	MOS -	MOS -	WGI; 9	WGI; 3	ELK; DNF	ELK; 5	LAS; DNF	LAS; 4					4th	97
2019	No. 30 Audi R8 LMS GT4	Erin Vogel	Sprint Am	STP -	STP -	LBGP -	VIR -	VIR -	MOS -	MOS -	SON; 8	SON; 9	WGI -	WGI -	ELK -	ELK -	LAS -	LAS -		30th	0
2020	No. 210 Aston Martin Vantage GT4	Michael Dinan	Sprint Am	AUS; 1	AUS; 2	VIR; 1	VIR; 1	VIR; 1	SON; 1	SON; 2	SON; 5	ELK; 1	ELK; 1	ELK; 1	AUS; 1	AUS; DNS	AUS; 1	IMS; 9	IMS; 1	1st	323
2020	No. 21 Aston Martin Vantage GT4	Michael Dinan and Robby Foley	SprintX Pro/Am	AUS; 5	AUS; 2	VIR; 5	VIR; 5	VIR; 7	SON; 2	SON; 1	SON; 1	ELK; DNF	ELK; 1	ELK; 1	AUS; 1	AUS; DNS	IMS; 5	IMS; 1		1st	232
2020	No. 30 McLaren 570S GT4	Erin Vogel and Michael Cooper	SprintX Pro/Am	AUS; 6	AUS; 10	VIR; 10	VIR; 9	VIR; 4	SON; 8	SON; 6	SON; 9	ELK; 5	ELK; 6	ELK; DNF	AUS; 8	AUS; 10	IMS; 8	IMS; 7		9th	69

==== GT America ====
Year	Car	Driver	Class	1	2	3	4	5	6	7	8	9	10	11	12	13	14	15	16	Rank	Points
2021	No. 460 Porsche 911 GT3 R	Andy Wilzoch	Masters	SON -	SON -	AUS; 1	AUS; 2	VIR -	VIR -	NAS -	NAS -	ELK; 2	ELK; 1	WGI; 3	WGI; 3	SEB; 1	SEB; 1	IMS; 5	IMS; 6	7th	97
2021	No. 101 Bentley Continental GT3 (As TKO Motorsports)	Memo Gidley	SRO3	SON -	SON -	AUS -	AUS -	VIR -	VIR -	NAS -	NAS -	ELK; 2	ELK; DNF	WGI -	WGI -	SEB; 1	SEB; 1	IMS; 8	IMS; 2	11th	40

=== 25 Hours of Thunderhill results ===
Year	Class	Car	Drivers	Overall Pos.	class Pos.
2015	ES	No. 45 Audi R8 LMS	Darren Law; Tomonobu Fujii; Guy Cosmo; Johannes van Overbeek	1st	1st
2016	ES	No. 45 Audi R8 LMS	Darren Law; Johannes van Overbeek; Mike Hedlund; Dion von Moltke	1st	1st
2016	ES	No. 74 Porsche 911 GT3 RSR	Tommy Sadler; Andy Wilzoch; Charlie Hayes; Will Owen	3rd	2nd
2017	ES	No. 45 Audi R8 LMS	Darren Law; Nate Stacy; Tom Haacker; Charlie Hayes	1st	1st
2017	Toyo Tires GT Challenge	No. 74 Porsche Cayman GT4 Clubsport	Johannes van Overbeek; Mike Hedlund; Craig Watkins; Ross Thompson	1st	6th
2018	ES	No. 45 Audi R8 LMS	Wolf Henzler; Charlie Hayes; Johannes van Overbeek; Justin Marks; Andy Wizoch	1st	1st
2018	Toyo Tires GT Challenge	No. 74 Porsche 911 GT3 RSR	Ashton Harrison; Christina Nielsen; Erin Vogel; Laura Ely; Aurora Straus	4th	1st
2019	GT Challenge	No. 45 Audi R8 GT4	Charlie Hayes; Tommy Sadler; Ross Thompson; Andy Wilzoch; Masato Kawabata	41st	3rd

=== 24 Hours of Le Mans results ===
Year	Entrant	No.	Car	Drivers	Class	Laps	Pos.	Class Pos.
2005	(United States) Flying Lizard Motorsports	80	Porsche 911 GT3-RSR	(United States) Seth Neiman (United States) Lonnie Pechnik (United States) Johannes van Overbeek	LMGT2	323	13th	3rd
2006	(United States) Flying Lizard Motorsports	80	Porsche 911 GT3-RSR	(United States) Patrick Long (United States) Seth Neiman (United States) Johannes van Overbeek	LMGT2	309	18th	4th
2007	(United States) Flying Lizard Motorsports	80	Porsche 997 GT3-RSR	(Germany) Jörg Bergmeister (United States) Seth Neiman (United States) Johannes van Overbeek	LMGT2	124	DNF	DNF
2008	(United States) Flying Lizard Motorsports	80	Porsche 997 GT3-RSR	(Germany) Jörg Bergmeister (United States) Seth Neiman (United States) Johannes van Overbeek	LMGT2	289	32nd	6th
2009	(United States) Flying Lizard Motorsports	80	Porsche 997 GT3-RSR	(Germany) Jörg Bergmeister (United States) Darren Law (United States) Seth Neiman	LMGT2	194	DNF	DNF
2010	(United States) Flying Lizard Motorsports	80	Porsche 997 GT3-RSR	(Germany) Jörg Bergmeister (United States) Darren Law (United States) Seth Neiman	LMGT2	61	DNF	DNF
2011	(United States) Flying Lizard Motorsports	80	Porsche 997 GT3-RSR	(Germany) Jörg Bergmeister (United States) Patrick Long (Germany) Lucas Luhr	LMGTE Pro	310	18th	6th
2011	(United States) Flying Lizard Motorsports	81	Porsche 997 GT3-RSR	(United States) Darren Law (United States) Seth Neiman (United States) Spencer Pumpelly	LMGTE Am	211	DNF	DNF
2012	(United States) Flying Lizard Motorsports	80	Porsche 997 GT3-RSR	(Germany) Jörg Bergmeister (Germany) Marco Holzer (United States) Patrick Long	LMGTE Pro	114	DNF	DNF
2012	(United States) Flying Lizard Motorsports	79	Porsche 997 GT3-RSR	(United States) Seth Neiman (France) Patrick Pilet (United States) Spencer Pumpelly	LMGTE Am	313	27th	4th
2014	(United Kingdom) JMW Motorsport	66	Ferrari 458 Italia GT2	(Saudi Arabia) Abdulaziz Al Faisal (United States) Seth Neiman (United States) Spencer Pumpelly	LMGTE Am	327	27th	7th

=== 24 Hours of Daytona results ===
Year	Class	No	Car	Team	Drivers	Laps	Pos.	Class Pos.
2004	GT	74	Porsche 996 GT3 Cup	Flying Lizard Motorsports	(United States) Johannes van Overbeek (United States) Seth Neiman (United States) Lonnie Pechnik (United States) Peter Cunningham (Germany) Mike Rockenfeller	523	3rd	2nd
2010	GT	67	Porsche 997 GT3 Cup	The Racer's Group/Flying Lizard Motorsports	(Germany) Jorg Bergmeister (United States) Patrick Long (United States) Seth Neiman (United States) Johannes van Overbeek	703	9th	2nd
2011	DP	45	Riley MkXI-Porsche	Flying Lizard Motorsports	(Germany) Jorg Bergmeister (United States) Patrick Long (United States) Seth Neiman (United States) Johannes van Overbeek	654	22nd	13th
2014	GTD	35	Audi R8 LMS	Flying Lizard Motorsports	(United States) Seth Neiman (South Africa) Dion von Moltke (United Kingdom) Alessandro Latif (Portugal) Filipe Albuquerque	661	22nd	5th
2014	GTD	45	Audi R8 LMS	Flying Lizard Motorsports	(United States) Spencer Pumpelly (United States) Tim Pappas (Venezuela) Nelson Canache Jr. (Germany) Markus Winkelhock	662	19th	2nd
2015	GTD	45	Audi R8 LMS	Flying Lizard Motorsports	(Germany) Markus Winkelhock (United States) Robert Thorne (Japan) Satoshi Hoshino (Japan) Tomonobu Fujii	670	24th	10th
2016	GTD	45	Audi R8 LMS GT3	Flying Lizard Motorsports	(Sweden) Niclas Jönsson (Germany) Pierre Kaffer (Germany) Christopher Haase (United States) Tracy Krohn	513	43rd	DNF
