= 2003 Grand Prix de Trois-Rivières =

The 2003 Grand Prix de Trois-Rivières was the fourth race of the 2003 American Le Mans Series season. It took place at Circuit Trois-Rivières in Trois-Rivières, Quebec on August 3, 2003.

== Official results ==
Class winners in bold. Cars failing to complete 75% of winner's distance marked as Not Classified (NC).

Pos	Class	No	Team	Drivers	Chassis	Tyre	Laps
Pos	Class	No	Team	Drivers	Engine	Tyre	Laps
1	**LMP900**	**1**	**(Germany) Infineon Team Joest**	**(Germany) Marco Werner (Germany) Frank Biela**	**Audi R8**	MI	**169**
1	**LMP900**	**1**	**(Germany) Infineon Team Joest**	**(Germany) Marco Werner (Germany) Frank Biela**	**Audi 3.6L Turbo V8**	MI	**169**
2	LMP900	38	(United States) ADT Champion Racing	(United Kingdom) Johnny Herbert (Finland) JJ Lehto	Audi R8	MI	169
2	LMP900	38	(United States) ADT Champion Racing	(United Kingdom) Johnny Herbert (Finland) JJ Lehto	Audi 3.6L Turbo V8	MI	169
3	LMP900	10	(United States) JML Team Panoz	(Monaco) Olivier Beretta (Belgium) David Saelens	Panoz LMP01 Evo	MI	164
3	LMP900	10	(United States) JML Team Panoz	(Monaco) Olivier Beretta (Belgium) David Saelens	Élan 6L8 6.0L V8	MI	164
4	**GTS**	**4**	**(United States) Corvette Racing**	**(United States) Kelly Collins (United Kingdom) Oliver Gavin**	**Chevrolet Corvette C5-R**	G	**162**
4	**GTS**	**4**	**(United States) Corvette Racing**	**(United States) Kelly Collins (United Kingdom) Oliver Gavin**	**Chevrolet LS7-R 7.0L V8**	G	**162**
5	GTS	3	(United States) Corvette Racing	(Canada) Ron Fellows (United States) Johnny O'Connell	Chevrolet Corvette C5-R	G	162
5	GTS	3	(United States) Corvette Racing	(Canada) Ron Fellows (United States) Johnny O'Connell	Chevrolet LS7-R 7.0L V8	G	162
6	LMP900	11	(United States) JML Team Panoz	(Canada) Scott Maxwell (United States) Gunnar Jeannette	Panoz LMP01 Evo	MI	162
6	LMP900	11	(United States) JML Team Panoz	(Canada) Scott Maxwell (United States) Gunnar Jeannette	Élan 6L8 6.0L V8	MI	162
7	LMP900	12	(United States) American Spirit Racing	(United States) Michael Lewis (United States) Tomy Drissi	Riley & Scott Mk III C	D	159
7	LMP900	12	(United States) American Spirit Racing	(United States) Michael Lewis (United States) Tomy Drissi	Lincoln (Élan) 5.0L V8	D	159
8	GTS	0	(Italy) Team Olive Garden	(Italy) Emanuele Naspetti (Italy) Mimmo Schiattarella	Ferrari 550 Maranello	P	157
8	GTS	0	(Italy) Team Olive Garden	(Italy) Emanuele Naspetti (Italy) Mimmo Schiattarella	Ferrari 6.0L V12	P	157
9	**GT**	**23**	**(United States) Alex Job Racing**	**(Germany) Lucas Luhr (Germany) Sascha Maassen**	**Porsche 911 GT3-RS**	MI	**156**
9	**GT**	**23**	**(United States) Alex Job Racing**	**(Germany) Lucas Luhr (Germany) Sascha Maassen**	**Porsche 3.6L Flat-6**	MI	**156**
10	**LMP675**	**37**	**(United States) Intersport Racing**	**(United States) Jon Field (United States) Duncan Dayton**	**MG-Lola EX257**	G	**154**
10	**LMP675**	**37**	**(United States) Intersport Racing**	**(United States) Jon Field (United States) Duncan Dayton**	**MG (AER) XP20 2.0L Turbo I4**	G	**154**
11	LMP900	30	(United States) Intersport Racing	(United States) Clint Field (United States) Mike Durand	Lola B2K/10B	G	154
11	LMP900	30	(United States) Intersport Racing	(United States) Clint Field (United States) Mike Durand	Judd GV4 4.0L V10	G	154
12	GT	35	(United States) Risi Competizione	(United States) Anthony Lazzaro (Germany) Ralf Kelleners	Ferrari 360 Modena GTC	MI	153
12	GT	35	(United States) Risi Competizione	(United States) Anthony Lazzaro (Germany) Ralf Kelleners	Ferrari 3.6L V8	MI	153
13	GTS	80	(United Kingdom) Prodrive	(Australia) David Brabham (Denmark) Jan Magnussen	Ferrari 550-GTS Maranello	MI	152
13	GTS	80	(United Kingdom) Prodrive	(Australia) David Brabham (Denmark) Jan Magnussen	Ferrari 5.9L V12	MI	152
14	GT	79	(United States) J3 Racing	(United States) David Murry (United States) Justin Jackson	Porsche 911 GT3-RS	MI	152
14	GT	79	(United States) J3 Racing	(United States) David Murry (United States) Justin Jackson	Porsche 3.6L Flat-6	MI	152
15	GT	63	(United States) ACEMCO Motorsports	(United States) Terry Borcheller (United States) Shane Lewis	Ferrari 360 Modena GTC	Y	151
15	GT	63	(United States) ACEMCO Motorsports	(United States) Terry Borcheller (United States) Shane Lewis	Ferrari 3.6L V8	Y	151
16	GT	33	(United States) ZIP Racing	(United States) Andy Lally (United States) Spencer Pumpelly	Porsche 911 GT3-RS	D	145
16	GT	33	(United States) ZIP Racing	(United States) Andy Lally (United States) Spencer Pumpelly	Porsche 3.6L Flat-6	D	145
17	GT	89	(United States) Inline Cunningham Racing	(Brazil) Oswaldo Negri Jr. (United States) Scott Bader	Porsche 911 GT3-RS	Y	145
17	GT	89	(United States) Inline Cunningham Racing	(Brazil) Oswaldo Negri Jr. (United States) Scott Bader	Porsche 3.6L Flat-6	Y	145
18	LMP675	18	(United States) Essex Racing	(United States) Melanie Paterson (United States) Jason Workman	Lola B2K/40	P	133
18	LMP675	18	(United States) Essex Racing	(United States) Melanie Paterson (United States) Jason Workman	Nissan (AER) VQL 3.0L V6	P	133
19	GT	43	(United States) Orbit Racing	(Germany) Marc Lieb (United States) Peter Baron	Porsche 911 GT3-RS	MI	131
19	GT	43	(United States) Orbit Racing	(Germany) Marc Lieb (United States) Peter Baron	Porsche 3.6L Flat-6	MI	131
20 DNF	GTS	88	(United Kingdom) Prodrive	(Czech Republic) Tomáš Enge (Netherlands) Peter Kox	Ferrari 550-GTS Maranello	MI	115
20 DNF	GTS	88	(United Kingdom) Prodrive	(Czech Republic) Tomáš Enge (Netherlands) Peter Kox	Ferrari 5.9L V12	MI	115
21	GT	68	(United States) The Racer's Group	(United States) Marc Bunting (United States) Chris Gleason	Porsche 911 GT3-RS	MI	107
21	GT	68	(United States) The Racer's Group	(United States) Marc Bunting (United States) Chris Gleason	Porsche 3.6L Flat-6	MI	107
22 DNF	LMP675	56	(United States) Team Bucknum Racing	(United States) Jeff Bucknum (United States) Bryan Willman (United States) Chris McMurry	Pilbeam MP91	D	106
22 DNF	LMP675	56	(United States) Team Bucknum Racing	(United States) Jeff Bucknum (United States) Bryan Willman (United States) Chris McMurry	Willman (JPX) 3.4L V6	D	106
23 DNF	GT	24	(United States) Alex Job Racing	(Germany) Jörg Bergmeister (Germany) Timo Bernhard	Porsche 911 GT3-RS	MI	85
23 DNF	GT	24	(United States) Alex Job Racing	(Germany) Jörg Bergmeister (Germany) Timo Bernhard	Porsche 3.6L Flat-6	MI	85
24 DNF	GT	66	(United States) The Racer's Group	(United States) Kevin Buckler (United States) Cort Wagner	Porsche 911 GT3-RS	MI	70
24 DNF	GT	66	(United States) The Racer's Group	(United States) Kevin Buckler (United States) Cort Wagner	Porsche 3.6L Flat-6	MI	70
25 DNF	LMP675	16	(United States) Dyson Racing	(United States) Butch Leitzinger (United Kingdom) James Weaver	MG-Lola EX257	G	63
25 DNF	LMP675	16	(United States) Dyson Racing	(United States) Butch Leitzinger (United Kingdom) James Weaver	MG (AER) XP20 2.0L Turbo I4	G	63
26 DNF	GT	28	(United States) JMB Racing USA	(France) Stéphane Grégoire (Chile) Eliseo Salazar (Italy) Christian Pescatori	Ferrari 360 Modena GTC	P	56
26 DNF	GT	28	(United States) JMB Racing USA	(France) Stéphane Grégoire (Chile) Eliseo Salazar (Italy) Christian Pescatori	Ferrari 3.6L V8	P	56
27 DNF	GT	61	(United Kingdom) P.K. Sport	(United States) Spencer Trenery (United States) Vic Rice	Porsche 911 GT3-R	P	54
27 DNF	GT	61	(United Kingdom) P.K. Sport	(United States) Spencer Trenery (United States) Vic Rice	Porsche 3.6L Flat-6	P	54
28 DNF	GT	60	(United Kingdom) P.K. Sport	(United Kingdom) Robin Liddell (Australia) Alex Davison	Porsche 911 GT3-RS	P	50
28 DNF	GT	60	(United Kingdom) P.K. Sport	(United Kingdom) Robin Liddell (Australia) Alex Davison	Porsche 3.6L Flat-6	P	50
29 DNF	GT	67	(United States) The Racer's Group	(United States) Michael Schrom (Canada) Jean-François Dumoulin	Porsche 911 GT3-RS	MI	5
29 DNF	GT	67	(United States) The Racer's Group	(United States) Michael Schrom (Canada) Jean-François Dumoulin	Porsche 3.6L Flat-6	MI	5
30 DNF	LMP675	20	(United States) Dyson Racing	(United States) Chris Dyson (United Kingdom) Andy Wallace	MG-Lola EX257	G	1
30 DNF	LMP675	20	(United States) Dyson Racing	(United States) Chris Dyson (United Kingdom) Andy Wallace	MG (AER) XP20 2.0L Turbo I4	G	1
DNS	GT	03	(United States) Hyper Sport	(United States) Joe Foster (United States) Brad Nyberg (United States) Rick Skelton	Panoz Esperante GT-LM	P	-
DNS	GT	03	(United States) Hyper Sport	(United States) Joe Foster (United States) Brad Nyberg (United States) Rick Skelton	Élan 5.0L V8	P	-

== Statistics ==
- Pole Position - #1 Infineon Team Joest - 0:57.740
- Fastest Lap - #1 Infineon Team Joest - 0:59.265
- Distance - 413.680 km
- Average Speed - 137.808 km/h

American Le Mans Series
Previous race: 2003 Grand Prix of Sonoma	2003 season	Next race: 2003 Grand Prix of Mosport
