= 2003 Grand Prix of Sonoma =

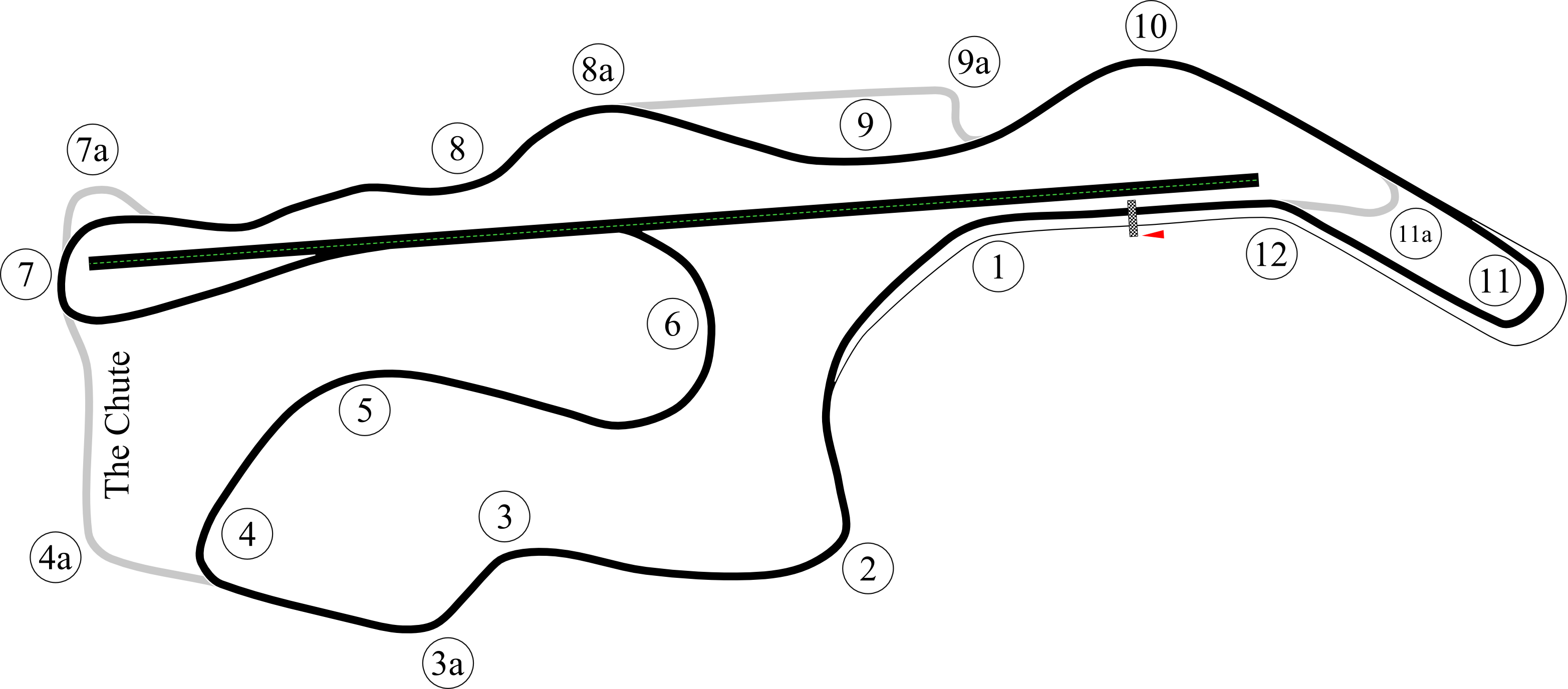
Sonoma Raceway

The 2003 Infineon Grand Prix of Sonoma was the third race of the 2003 American Le Mans Series season. It took place at Infineon Raceway, California on July 27, 2003.

This race marked the first time in American Le Mans Series history since the introduction of the two separate Le Mans Prototype classes in 2001 that the smaller of the two won a race overall. The LMP675 class Dyson Lola-MG defeated the LMP900 class Joest Audi by a margin of 3.7 seconds.

== Official results ==
Class winners in bold. Cars failing to complete 75% of winner's distance marked as Not Classified (NC).

Pos	Class	No	Team	Drivers	Chassis	Tyre	Laps
Pos	Class	No	Team	Drivers	Engine	Tyre	Laps
1	**LMP675**	**16**	**(United States) Dyson Racing**	**(United States) Butch Leitzinger (United Kingdom) James Weaver**	**MG-Lola EX257**	G	**102**
1	**LMP675**	**16**	**(United States) Dyson Racing**	**(United States) Butch Leitzinger (United Kingdom) James Weaver**	**MG (AER) XP20 2.0L Turbo I4**	G	**102**
2	**LMP900**	**1**	**(Germany) Infineon Team Joest**	**(Germany) Marco Werner (Germany) Frank Biela**	**Audi R8**	M	**102**
2	**LMP900**	**1**	**(Germany) Infineon Team Joest**	**(Germany) Marco Werner (Germany) Frank Biela**	**Audi 3.6L Turbo V8**	M	**102**
3	LMP900	38	(United States) ADT Champion Racing	(United Kingdom) Johnny Herbert (Finland) JJ Lehto	Audi R8	M	102
3	LMP900	38	(United States) ADT Champion Racing	(United Kingdom) Johnny Herbert (Finland) JJ Lehto	Audi 3.6L Turbo V8	M	102
4	LMP900	27	(United States) Doran Lista Racing	(Belgium) Didier Theys (United States) Bill Auberlen	Dallara SP1	M	102
4	LMP900	27	(United States) Doran Lista Racing	(Belgium) Didier Theys (United States) Bill Auberlen	Judd GV5 5.0L V10	M	102
5	LMP900	10	(United States) JML Team Panoz	(Monaco) Olivier Beretta (United States) Gunnar Jeannette	Panoz LMP01 Evo	M	101
5	LMP900	10	(United States) JML Team Panoz	(Monaco) Olivier Beretta (United States) Gunnar Jeannette	Élan 6L8 6.0L V8	M	101
6	LMP900	11	(United States) JML Team Panoz	(Switzerland) Benjamin Leuenberger (Belgium) David Saelens	Panoz LMP01 Evo	M	101
6	LMP900	11	(United States) JML Team Panoz	(Switzerland) Benjamin Leuenberger (Belgium) David Saelens	Élan 6L8 6.0L V8	M	101
7	LMP675	20	(United States) Dyson Racing	(United States) Chris Dyson (United Kingdom) Andy Wallace	MG-Lola EX257	G	100
7	LMP675	20	(United States) Dyson Racing	(United States) Chris Dyson (United Kingdom) Andy Wallace	MG (AER) XP20 2.0L Turbo I4	G	100
8	**GTS**	**3**	**(United States) Corvette Racing**	**(Canada) Ron Fellows (United States) Johnny O'Connell**	**Chevrolet Corvette C5-R**	G	**97**
8	**GTS**	**3**	**(United States) Corvette Racing**	**(Canada) Ron Fellows (United States) Johnny O'Connell**	**Chevrolet LS7-R 7.0L V8**	G	**97**
9	GTS	4	(United States) Corvette Racing	(United States) Kelly Collins (United Kingdom) Oliver Gavin	Chevrolet Corvette C5-R	G	97
9	GTS	4	(United States) Corvette Racing	(United States) Kelly Collins (United Kingdom) Oliver Gavin	Chevrolet LS7-R 7.0L V8	G	97
10	GTS	80	(United Kingdom) Prodrive	(Australia) David Brabham (Denmark) Jan Magnussen	Ferrari 550-GTS Maranello	M	96
10	GTS	80	(United Kingdom) Prodrive	(Australia) David Brabham (Denmark) Jan Magnussen	Ferrari 5.9L V12	M	96
11	LMP900	30	(United States) Intersport Racing	(United States) Clint Field (United States) Rick Sutherland	Lola B2K/10B	G	94
11	LMP900	30	(United States) Intersport Racing	(United States) Clint Field (United States) Rick Sutherland	Judd GV4 4.0L V10	G	94
12	GTS	88	(United Kingdom) Prodrive	(Czech Republic) Tomáš Enge (Netherlands) Peter Kox	Ferrari 550-GTS Maranello	M	94
12	GTS	88	(United Kingdom) Prodrive	(Czech Republic) Tomáš Enge (Netherlands) Peter Kox	Ferrari 5.9L V12	M	94
13	**GT**	**23**	**(United States) Alex Job Racing**	**(Germany) Lucas Luhr (Germany) Sascha Maassen**	**Porsche 911 GT3-RS**	M	**93**
13	**GT**	**23**	**(United States) Alex Job Racing**	**(Germany) Lucas Luhr (Germany) Sascha Maassen**	**Porsche 3.6L Flat-6**	M	**93**
14	GT	24	(United States) Alex Job Racing	(Germany) Jörg Bergmeister (Germany) Timo Bernhard	Porsche 911 GT3-RS	M	93
14	GT	24	(United States) Alex Job Racing	(Germany) Jörg Bergmeister (Germany) Timo Bernhard	Porsche 3.6L Flat-6	M	93
15	GT	35	(United States) Risi Competizione	(United States) Anthony Lazzaro (Germany) Ralf Kelleners	Ferrari 360 Modena GTC	M	93
15	GT	35	(United States) Risi Competizione	(United States) Anthony Lazzaro (Germany) Ralf Kelleners	Ferrari 3.6L V8	M	93
16	GT	66	(United States) The Racer's Group	(United States) Kevin Buckler (United States) Cort Wagner	Porsche 911 GT3-RS	M	93
16	GT	66	(United States) The Racer's Group	(United States) Kevin Buckler (United States) Cort Wagner	Porsche 3.6L Flat-6	M	93
17	GT	31	(United States) Petersen Motorsport (United States) White Lightning Racing	(United States) Craig Stanton (United Kingdom) Johnny Mowlem	Porsche 911 GT3-RS	M	92
17	GT	31	(United States) Petersen Motorsport (United States) White Lightning Racing	(United States) Craig Stanton (United Kingdom) Johnny Mowlem	Porsche 3.6L Flat-6	M	92
18	LMP675	18	(United States) Essex Racing	(Canada) David McEntee (United States) Jason Workman	Lola B2K/40	P	92
18	LMP675	18	(United States) Essex Racing	(Canada) David McEntee (United States) Jason Workman	Nissan (AER) VQL 3.0L V6	P	92
19	GT	79	(United States) J3 Racing	(United States) David Murry (United States) Justin Jackson	Porsche 911 GT3-RS	M	91
19	GT	79	(United States) J3 Racing	(United States) David Murry (United States) Justin Jackson	Porsche 3.6L Flat-6	M	91
20	GT	43	(United States) Orbit Racing	(United States) Leo Hindery (United States) Peter Baron	Porsche 911 GT3-RS	M	91
20	GT	43	(United States) Orbit Racing	(United States) Leo Hindery (United States) Peter Baron	Porsche 3.6L Flat-6	M	91
21	GT	67	(United States) The Racer's Group	(United States) Michael Schrom (Germany) Pierre Ehret	Porsche 911 GT3-RS	M	90
21	GT	67	(United States) The Racer's Group	(United States) Michael Schrom (Germany) Pierre Ehret	Porsche 3.6L Flat-6	M	90
22	GTS	0	(Italy) Team Olive Garden	(Italy) Emanuele Naspetti (Italy) Mimmo Schiattarella	Ferrari 550 Maranello	P	90
22	GTS	0	(Italy) Team Olive Garden	(Italy) Emanuele Naspetti (Italy) Mimmo Schiattarella	Ferrari 6.0L V12	P	90
23	GT	42	(United States) Orbit Racing	(United States) Joe Policastro (United States) Joe Policastro Jr.	Porsche 911 GT3-RS	M	89
23	GT	42	(United States) Orbit Racing	(United States) Joe Policastro (United States) Joe Policastro Jr.	Porsche 3.6L Flat-6	M	89
24	GT	89	(United States) Inline Cunningham Racing	(Brazil) Oswaldo Negri Jr. (United States) Scott Bader	Porsche 911 GT3-RS	Y	87
24	GT	89	(United States) Inline Cunningham Racing	(Brazil) Oswaldo Negri Jr. (United States) Scott Bader	Porsche 3.6L Flat-6	Y	87
25	GT	28	(United States) JMB Racing USA	(France) Stéphane Grégoire (Chile) Eliseo Salazar	Ferrari 360 Modena GTC	P	87
25	GT	28	(United States) JMB Racing USA	(France) Stéphane Grégoire (Chile) Eliseo Salazar	Ferrari 3.6L V8	P	87
26	GT	61	(United Kingdom) P.K. Sport	(United States) Keith Alexander (United States) Vic Rice	Porsche 911 GT3-R	P	87
26	GT	61	(United Kingdom) P.K. Sport	(United States) Keith Alexander (United States) Vic Rice	Porsche 3.6L Flat-6	P	87
27	GT	63	(United States) ACEMCO Motorsports	(United States) Terry Borcheller (United States) Shane Lewis	Ferrari 360 Modena GTC	Y	87
27	GT	63	(United States) ACEMCO Motorsports	(United States) Terry Borcheller (United States) Shane Lewis	Ferrari 3.6L V8	Y	87
28	GT	68	(United States) The Racer's Group	(United States) Marc Bunting (United States) Chris Gleason	Porsche 911 GT3-RS	M	81
28	GT	68	(United States) The Racer's Group	(United States) Marc Bunting (United States) Chris Gleason	Porsche 3.6L Flat-6	M	81
29 DNF	GT	60	(United Kingdom) P.K. Sport	(United Kingdom) Robin Liddell (Australia) Alex Davison	Porsche 911 GT3-RS	P	72
29 DNF	GT	60	(United Kingdom) P.K. Sport	(United Kingdom) Robin Liddell (Australia) Alex Davison	Porsche 3.6L Flat-6	P	72
30 DNF	GTS	71	(United States) Carsport America	(Canada) Aaron Povoledo (France) Jean-Philippe Belloc	Dodge Viper GTS-R	P	71
30 DNF	GTS	71	(United States) Carsport America	(Canada) Aaron Povoledo (France) Jean-Philippe Belloc	Dodge 8.0L V10	P	71
31 DNF	LMP900	12	(United States) American Spirit Racing	(United States) Michael Lewis (United States) Tomy Drissi	Riley & Scott Mk III C	D	45
31 DNF	LMP900	12	(United States) American Spirit Racing	(United States) Michael Lewis (United States) Tomy Drissi	Lincoln (Élan) 5.0L V8	D	45
32 DNF	GT	33	(United States) ZIP Racing	(United States) Andy Lally (United States) Spencer Pumpelly	Porsche 911 GT3-RS	D	44
32 DNF	GT	33	(United States) ZIP Racing	(United States) Andy Lally (United States) Spencer Pumpelly	Porsche 3.6L Flat-6	D	44
33 DNF	GT	29	(United States) JMB Racing USA	(Italy) Andrea Garbagnati (Italy) Ludovico Manfredi	Ferrari 360 Modena GTC	P	31
33 DNF	GT	29	(United States) JMB Racing USA	(Italy) Andrea Garbagnati (Italy) Ludovico Manfredi	Ferrari 3.6L V8	P	31
34 DNF	GT	03	(United States) Hyper Sport	(United States) Joe Foster (United States) Brad Nyberg (United States) Rick Skelton	Panoz Esperante GT-LM	P	28
34 DNF	GT	03	(United States) Hyper Sport	(United States) Joe Foster (United States) Brad Nyberg (United States) Rick Skelton	Élan 5.0L V8	P	28
35 DNF	LMP675	56	(United States) Team Bucknum Racing	(United States) Jeff Bucknum (United States) Bryan Willman (United States) Chris McMurry	Pilbeam MP91	D	24
35 DNF	LMP675	56	(United States) Team Bucknum Racing	(United States) Jeff Bucknum (United States) Bryan Willman (United States) Chris McMurry	Willman (JPX) 3.4L V6	D	24
DNS	LMP675	37	(United States) Intersport Racing	(United States) Jon Field (United States) Duncan Dayton	MG-Lola EX257	G	-
DNS	LMP675	37	(United States) Intersport Racing	(United States) Jon Field (United States) Duncan Dayton	MG (AER) XP20 2.0L Turbo I4	G	-

== Statistics ==
- Pole Position - #16 Dyson Racing - 1:23.085
- Fastest Lap - #16 Dyson Racing - 1:24.229
- Distance - 415.307 km
- Average Speed - 150.145 km/h

American Le Mans Series
Previous race: 2003 Grand Prix of Atlanta	2003 season	Next race: 2003 Grand Prix de Trois-Rivières
