= 2003 Grand Prix of Atlanta =

Track map of Road Atlanta

The 2003 Chevrolet Grand Prix of Atlanta was the second race of the 2003 American Le Mans Series season. It took place at Road Atlanta, Georgia on June 29, 2003.

== Official results ==
Class winners in bold. Cars failing to complete 75% of winner's distance marked as Not Classified (NC).

Pos	Class	No	Team	Drivers	Chassis	Tyre	Laps
Pos	Class	No	Team	Drivers	Engine	Tyre	Laps
1	**LMP900**	**38**	**(United States) ADT Champion Racing**	**(United Kingdom) Johnny Herbert (Finland) JJ Lehto**	**Audi R8**	MI	**128**
1	**LMP900**	**38**	**(United States) ADT Champion Racing**	**(United Kingdom) Johnny Herbert (Finland) JJ Lehto**	**Audi 3.6L Turbo V8**	MI	**128**
2	LMP900	1	(Germany) Infineon Team Joest	(Germany) Marco Werner (Germany) Frank Biela	Audi R8	MI	128
2	LMP900	1	(Germany) Infineon Team Joest	(Germany) Marco Werner (Germany) Frank Biela	Audi 3.6L Turbo V8	MI	128
3	**LMP675**	**37**	**(United States) Intersport Racing**	**(United States) Jon Field (United States) Duncan Dayton**	**MG-Lola EX257**	G	**126**
3	**LMP675**	**37**	**(United States) Intersport Racing**	**(United States) Jon Field (United States) Duncan Dayton**	**MG (AER) XP20 2.0L Turbo I4**	G	**126**
4	LMP675	16	(United States) Dyson Racing	(United States) Butch Leitzinger (United Kingdom) James Weaver	MG-Lola EX257	G	126
4	LMP675	16	(United States) Dyson Racing	(United States) Butch Leitzinger (United Kingdom) James Weaver	MG (AER) XP20 2.0L Turbo I4	G	126
5	LMP900	27	(United States) Doran Lista Racing	(Belgium) Didier Theys (Belgium) Eric van de Poele	Dallara SP1	MI	125
5	LMP900	27	(United States) Doran Lista Racing	(Belgium) Didier Theys (Belgium) Eric van de Poele	Judd GV5 5.0L V10	MI	125
6	LMP900	10	(United States) JML Team Panoz	(Monaco) Olivier Beretta (Italy) Max Papis	Panoz LMP01 Evo	MI	125
6	LMP900	10	(United States) JML Team Panoz	(Monaco) Olivier Beretta (Italy) Max Papis	Élan 6L8 6.0L V8	MI	125
7	**GTS**	**4**	**(United States) Corvette Racing**	**(United States) Kelly Collins (United Kingdom) Oliver Gavin**	**Chevrolet Corvette C5-R**	G	**118**
7	**GTS**	**4**	**(United States) Corvette Racing**	**(United States) Kelly Collins (United Kingdom) Oliver Gavin**	**Chevrolet LS7-R 7.0L V8**	G	**118**
8	GTS	88	(United Kingdom) Prodrive	(Czech Republic) Tomáš Enge (Netherlands) Peter Kox	Ferrari 550-GTS Maranello	MI	118
8	GTS	88	(United Kingdom) Prodrive	(Czech Republic) Tomáš Enge (Netherlands) Peter Kox	Ferrari 5.9L V12	MI	118
9	GTS	3	(United States) Corvette Racing	(Canada) Ron Fellows (United States) Johnny O'Connell	Chevrolet Corvette C5-R	G	116
9	GTS	3	(United States) Corvette Racing	(Canada) Ron Fellows (United States) Johnny O'Connell	Chevrolet LS7-R 7.0L V8	G	116
10	GTS	80	(United Kingdom) Prodrive	(France) Jérôme Policand (United States) Danica Patrick	Ferrari 550-GTS Maranello	MI	115
10	GTS	80	(United Kingdom) Prodrive	(France) Jérôme Policand (United States) Danica Patrick	Ferrari 5.9L V12	MI	115
11	LMP900	30	(United States) Intersport Racing	(United States) Clint Field (United States) Mike Durand	Lola B2K/10B	G	115
11	LMP900	30	(United States) Intersport Racing	(United States) Clint Field (United States) Mike Durand	Judd GV4 4.0L V10	G	115
12	LMP900	12	(United States) American Spirit Racing	(United States) Michael Lewis (United States) Tomy Drissi	Riley & Scott Mk III C	D	114
12	LMP900	12	(United States) American Spirit Racing	(United States) Michael Lewis (United States) Tomy Drissi	Lincoln (Élan) 5.0L V8	D	114
13	**GT**	**24**	**(United States) Alex Job Racing**	**(Germany) Jörg Bergmeister (Germany) Timo Bernhard**	**Porsche 911 GT3-RS**	MI	**113**
13	**GT**	**24**	**(United States) Alex Job Racing**	**(Germany) Jörg Bergmeister (Germany) Timo Bernhard**	**Porsche 3.6L Flat-6**	MI	**113**
14	GT	23	(United States) Alex Job Racing	(Germany) Lucas Luhr (Germany) Sascha Maassen	Porsche 911 GT3-RS	MI	113
14	GT	23	(United States) Alex Job Racing	(Germany) Lucas Luhr (Germany) Sascha Maassen	Porsche 3.6L Flat-6	MI	113
15	LMP675	20	(United States) Dyson Racing	(United States) Chris Dyson (United Kingdom) Andy Wallace	MG-Lola EX257	G	112
15	LMP675	20	(United States) Dyson Racing	(United States) Chris Dyson (United Kingdom) Andy Wallace	MG (AER) XP20 2.0L Turbo I4	G	112
16	GT	66	(United States) The Racer's Group	(United States) Kevin Buckler (United States) Cort Wagner	Porsche 911 GT3-RS	MI	110
16	GT	66	(United States) The Racer's Group	(United States) Kevin Buckler (United States) Cort Wagner	Porsche 3.6L Flat-6	MI	110
17	GT	79	(United States) J3 Racing	(United States) David Murry (United States) Justin Jackson	Porsche 911 GT3-RS	MI	110
17	GT	79	(United States) J3 Racing	(United States) David Murry (United States) Justin Jackson	Porsche 3.6L Flat-6	MI	110
18	GT	63	(United States) ACEMCO Motorsports	(United States) Andrew Davis (United States) Shane Lewis	Ferrari 360 Modena GTC	Y	110
18	GT	63	(United States) ACEMCO Motorsports	(United States) Andrew Davis (United States) Shane Lewis	Ferrari 3.6L V8	Y	110
19	GT	60	(United Kingdom) P.K. Sport	(United Kingdom) Robin Liddell (France) Jean-Philippe Belloc	Porsche 911 GT3-RS	P	109
19	GT	60	(United Kingdom) P.K. Sport	(United Kingdom) Robin Liddell (France) Jean-Philippe Belloc	Porsche 3.6L Flat-6	P	109
20	LMP675	64	(United States) Downing-Atlanta Inc.	(United States) Jim Downing (United States) Howard Katz	WR LMP02	D	108
20	LMP675	64	(United States) Downing-Atlanta Inc.	(United States) Jim Downing (United States) Howard Katz	Mazda R26B 2.6L 4-Rotor	D	108
21	GT	61	(United Kingdom) P.K. Sport	(United Kingdom) Piers Masarati (United States) Vic Rice	Porsche 911 GT3-R	P	107
21	GT	61	(United Kingdom) P.K. Sport	(United Kingdom) Piers Masarati (United States) Vic Rice	Porsche 3.6L Flat-6	P	107
22	GT	28	(United States) JMB Racing USA	(France) Stéphane Grégoire (Chile) Eliseo Salazar	Ferrari 360 Modena GTC	P	107
22	GT	28	(United States) JMB Racing USA	(France) Stéphane Grégoire (Chile) Eliseo Salazar	Ferrari 3.6L V8	P	107
23	LMP675	18	(United States) Essex Racing	(Canada) Melanie Paterson (United States) Jason Workman	Lola B2K/40	P	106
23	LMP675	18	(United States) Essex Racing	(Canada) Melanie Paterson (United States) Jason Workman	Nissan (AER) VQL 3.0L V6	P	106
24	GT	42	(United States) Orbit Racing	(United States) Joe Policastro (United States) Joe Policastro, Jr.	Porsche 911 GT3-RS	MI	106
24	GT	42	(United States) Orbit Racing	(United States) Joe Policastro (United States) Joe Policastro, Jr.	Porsche 3.6L Flat-6	MI	106
25	GT	43	(United States) Orbit Racing	(United States) Leo Hindery (United States) Peter Baron	Porsche 911 GT3-RS	MI	105
25	GT	43	(United States) Orbit Racing	(United States) Leo Hindery (United States) Peter Baron	Porsche 3.6L Flat-6	MI	105
26	GT	67	(United States) The Racer's Group	(United States) Michael Schrom (Germany) Pierre Ehret (United States) Marc Bunting	Porsche 911 GT3-RS	MI	104
26	GT	67	(United States) The Racer's Group	(United States) Michael Schrom (Germany) Pierre Ehret (United States) Marc Bunting	Porsche 3.6L Flat-6	MI	104
27	GT	52	(Germany) Seikel Motorsport	(United States) Philip Collin (Canada) Tony Burgess	Porsche 911 GT3-R	Y	101
27	GT	52	(Germany) Seikel Motorsport	(United States) Philip Collin (Canada) Tony Burgess	Porsche 3.6L Flat-6	Y	101
28	GTS	0	(Italy) Team Olive Garden	(Italy) Emanuele Naspetti (Italy) Mimmo Schiattarella	Ferrari 550 Maranello	P	92
28	GTS	0	(Italy) Team Olive Garden	(Italy) Emanuele Naspetti (Italy) Mimmo Schiattarella	Ferrari 6.0L V12	P	92
29 DNF	LMP900	11	(United States) JML Team Panoz	(United States) Gunnar Jeannette (Belgium) David Saelens	Panoz LMP01 Evo	MI	83
29 DNF	LMP900	11	(United States) JML Team Panoz	(United States) Gunnar Jeannette (Belgium) David Saelens	Élan 6L8 6.0L V8	MI	83
30 DNF	GT	33	(United States) ZIP Racing	(United States) Andy Lally (United States) Spencer Pumpelly	Porsche 911 GT3-RS	D	81
30 DNF	GT	33	(United States) ZIP Racing	(United States) Andy Lally (United States) Spencer Pumpelly	Porsche 3.6L Flat-6	D	81
31 DNF	GT	03	(United States) Hyper Sport	(United States) Joe Foster (United States) Brad Nyberg (United States) Rick Skelton	Panoz Esperante GT-LM	P	78
31 DNF	GT	03	(United States) Hyper Sport	(United States) Joe Foster (United States) Brad Nyberg (United States) Rick Skelton	Élan 5.0L V8	P	78
32 DNF	LMP675	77	(United States) AB Motorsport	(United States) Joe Blacker (United States) John Burke	Pilbeam MP84	A	54
32 DNF	LMP675	77	(United States) AB Motorsport	(United States) Joe Blacker (United States) John Burke	Nissan (AER) VQL 3.0L V6	A	54
33 DNF	GT	35	(United States) Risi Competizione	(United States) Anthony Lazzaro (Germany) Ralf Kelleners	Ferrari 360 Modena GTC	MI	31
33 DNF	GT	35	(United States) Risi Competizione	(United States) Anthony Lazzaro (Germany) Ralf Kelleners	Ferrari 3.6L V8	MI	31
34 DNF	LMP675	56	(United States) Team Bucknum Racing	(United States) Jeff Bucknum (United States) Bryan Willman (United States) Chris McMurry	Pilbeam MP91	D	30
34 DNF	LMP675	56	(United States) Team Bucknum Racing	(United States) Jeff Bucknum (United States) Bryan Willman (United States) Chris McMurry	Willman (JPX) 3.4L V6	D	30
35 DNF	GT	68	(United States) The Racer's Group	(United States) Marc Bunting (United States) Chris Gleason	Porsche 911 GT3-RS	MI	26
35 DNF	GT	68	(United States) The Racer's Group	(United States) Marc Bunting (United States) Chris Gleason	Porsche 3.6L Flat-6	MI	26
DNS	GTS	71	(United States) Carsport America	(United States) Tom Weickardt (France) Jean-Philippe Belloc	Dodge Viper GTS-R	P	-
DNS	GTS	71	(United States) Carsport America	(United States) Tom Weickardt (France) Jean-Philippe Belloc	Dodge 8.0L V10	P	-

== Statistics ==
- Pole Position - #16 Dyson Racing - 1:13.748
- Fastest Lap - #1 Infineon Team Joest - 1:13.932
- Distance - 523.230 km
- Average Speed - 189.677 km/h

American Le Mans Series
Previous race: 2003 12 Hours of Sebring	2003 season	Next race: 2003 Grand Prix of Sonoma
