= Spencer Pumpelly =

American racing driver

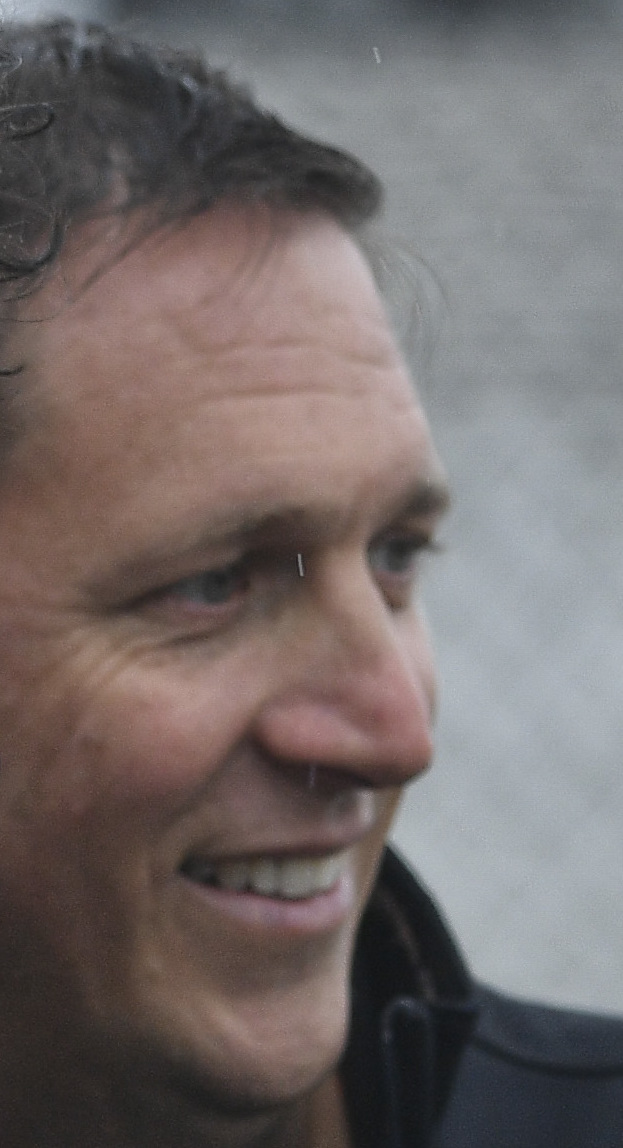
- Pumpelly at Virginia International Raceway in 2017
- Nationality: (United States) American
- Born: Spencer Lindsay Pumpelly; December 28, 1974 (age 51) Arlington, Virginia, U.S.

IMSA SportsCar Championship career
- Debut season: 2014
- Current team: Magnus Racing
- Categorisation: FIA Silver (until 2012, 2018–); FIA Gold (2013–2017)
- Car number: 44
- Former teams: Flying Lizard Motorsports, Park Place Motorsports, Change Racing, Alegra Motorsports, Team Hardpoint
- Best finish: 5th in 2015

NASCAR O'Reilly Auto Parts Series career
- 5 races run over 3 years
- 2023 position: 62nd
- Best finish: 58th (2021)
- First race: 2021 Pit Boss 250 (Austin)
- Last race: 2023 The Loop 121 (Chicago)
Wins	Top tens	Poles
0	0	0

Previous series
- 1998–2013 1999, 2003–2006, 2010–2013 2009: Rolex Sports Car Series; American Le Mans Series; ARCA Re/Max Series
- Statistics up to date as of June 27, 2023.

Spencer Lindsay Pumpelly (born December 28, 1974) is an American professional racing driver who competes part-time in IMSA, driving the No. 44 Acura NSX GT3 for Magnus Racing with Archangel Motorsports. A veteran sports car racing driver, Pumpelly has competed in IMSA and its predecessor series, the Rolex Sports Car Series and the American Le Mans Series since 1998 and 1999, respectively. He also has competed in the Continental Tire Sports Car Challenge, NASCAR Xfinity Series, and the ARCA Menards Series in the past.

== Racing career ==
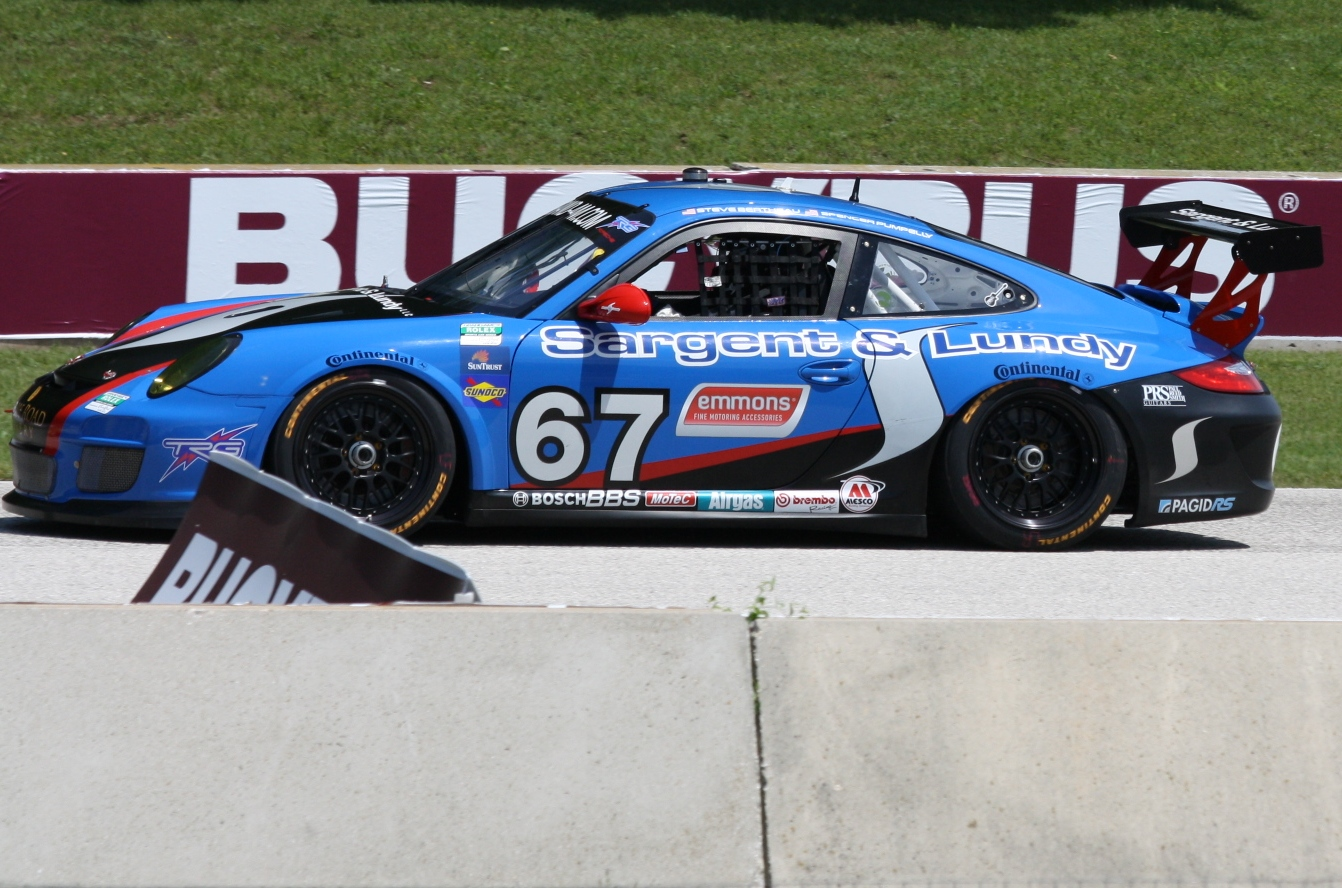
Pumpelly in the No. 67 for TRG Motorsports at Road America in 2011

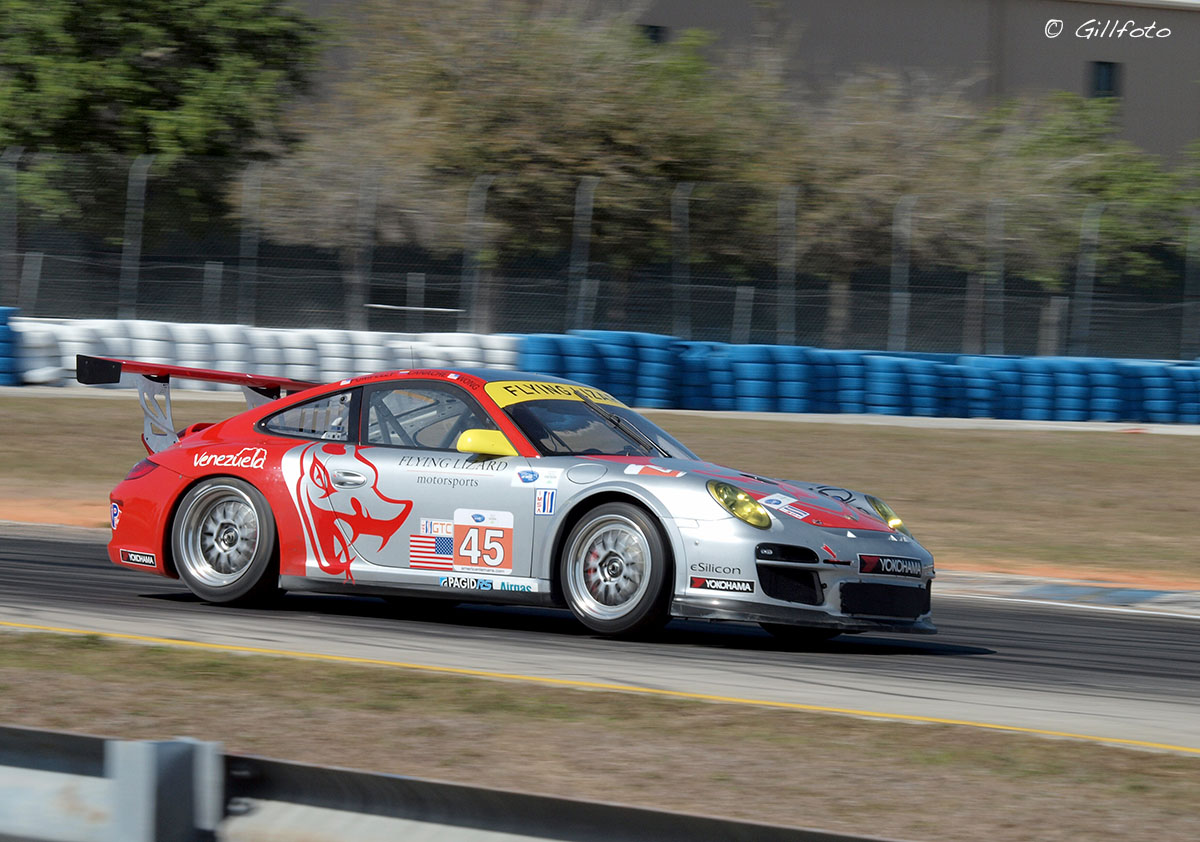
Pumpelly in the No. 45 for Flying Lizard Motorsports in the 2013 12 Hours of Sebring

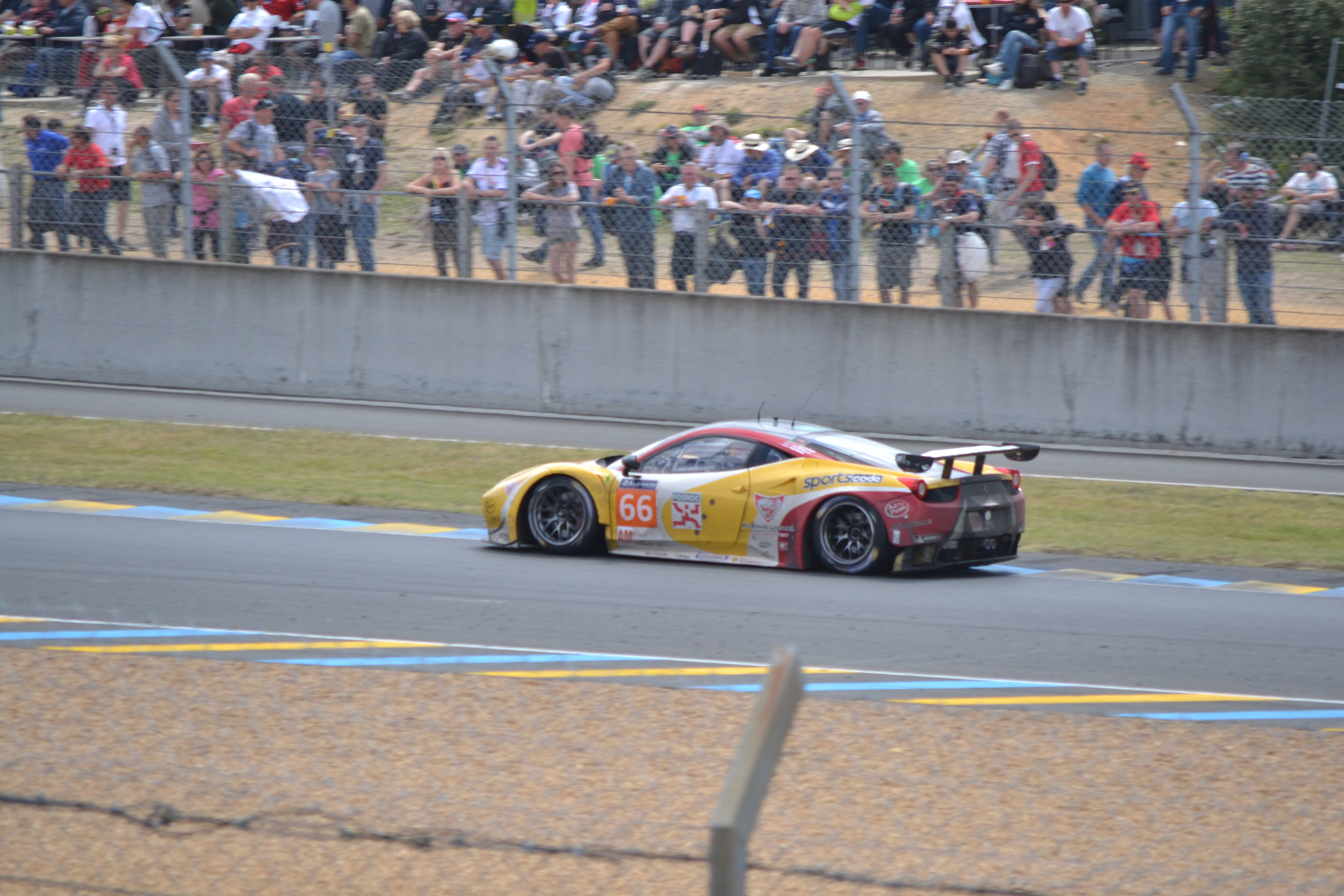
Pumpelly in the No. 66 for JMW Motorsport in the 2014 24 Hours of Le Mans

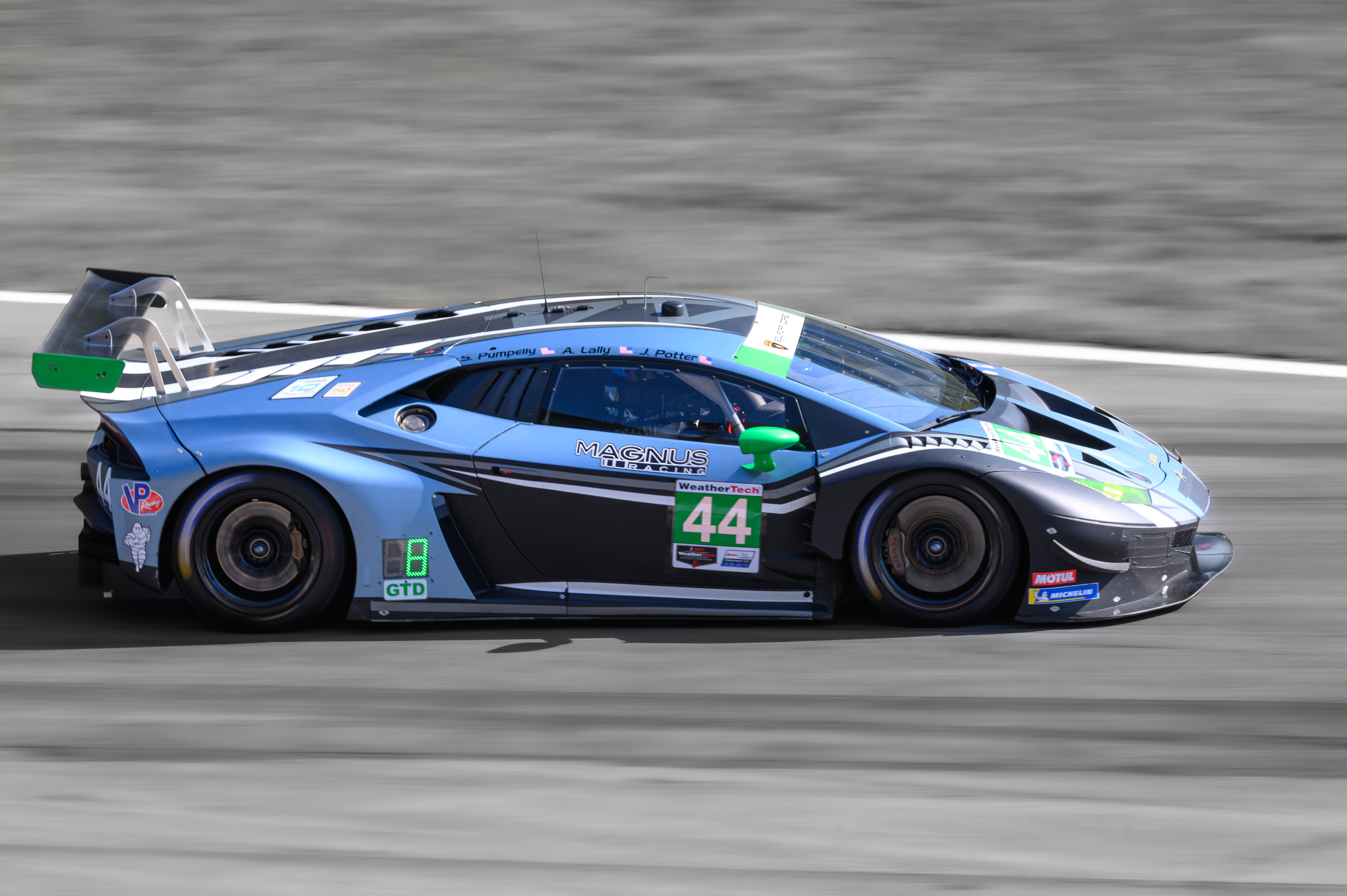
Pumpelly in the No. 44 for Magnus Racing in the 2019 Petit Le Mans at Road Atlanta

Pumpelly made his stock car racing debut when he competed in the ARCA Re/Max Series race at New Jersey Motorsports Park in 2009. Driving the No. 09 for TRG Motorsports using RAB Racing's owner points, he qualified fifth, and in the race, he led seven laps, and finished third.

Pumpelly drove for Flying Lizard Motorsports and BGB Motorsports during the 2013 season.

Pumpelly competed in the American Le Mans Series and Rolex Sports Car Series before the two series merged to become the IMSA SportsCar Championship Series in 2014.

On May 17, 2021, it was announced that Pumpelly would make his debut in the NASCAR Xfinity Series in the series' new race at Circuit of the Americas. He would drive the JD Motorsports No. 6 car, replacing its normal driver Ryan Vargas. Vargas had struggled during the season and with the race at COTA having qualifying and a smaller field of 36 cars (instead of the typical 40 in races without qualifying), the No. 6 car was in danger of failing to qualify due to being low in owner points.

In 2022, Pumpelly returned to the Xfinity Series to attempt two races as a road course ringer. He drove the No. 08 car for SS-Green Light Racing in the series' new race at Portland instead of David Starr, finishing 29th. He replaced Ryan Vargas in the JD Motorsports No. 6 car in a race for the second year in a row, this time in the race at Watkins Glen, although he would fail to qualify for the race.

In 2023, Pumpelly returned to SRO competition, joining Pedro Torres and ACI Motorsports in the GT World Challenge America. On June 27, it was announced that Pumpelly would return to SS-Green Light Racing to drive their No. 07 car in the new Xfinity Series race at the Chicago Street Course.

== Personal life ==
Pumpelly lives with his wife Lindsay, son Ryder, and daughter Parker in Atlanta. He has been a vegetarian since 2003 and a vegan since 2010. He attended college at James Madison University. During a visit to the Farm Sanctuary in June 2011, Pumpelly was quoted, saying "I'm honored to support Farm Sanctuary and the people who are devoted to defending others." In 2026, after losing a bet with GT4 America teammate Luca Mars by winning at Road America in a borrowed car, Pumpelly ate a steak for the first time in 23 years.

== Motorsports career results ==
=== Complete American Le Mans Series results ===
(key) (Races in bold indicate pole position; results in italics indicate fastest lap)

Year	Team	Class	Make	Engine	1	2	3	4	5	6	7	8	9	10	Pos.	Points	Ref
1999	Team Pumpelly Racing	GT	Porsche 911 Carrera RSR	Porsche 3.8 L Flat-6	SEB	ATL; 14	MOS	SON	POR	PET; Ret	MON	LSV					
2003	ZIP Racing	GT	Porsche 911 GT3-RS	Porsche 3.6 L Flat-6	SEB; 10	ATL; Ret	SON; Ret	TRO; 5	MOS	AME; 3	MON; Ret	MIA; 7	PET		18th	32	
2004	Marshall Cooke Racing	LMP2	Lola B2K/40	Ford (Millington) 2.0 L Turbo I4	SEB	MID	LIM	SON	POR	MOS	AME	PET; 2	MON		15th	22	
2005	ZIP Racing	GT2	Porsche 911 GT3-R	Porsche 3.6 L Flat-6	SEB; 6	ATL	MID	LIM	SON	POR	AME	MOS	PET	MON	32nd	12	
2006	J-3 Racing	GT2	Porsche 911 GT3-RSR	Porsche 3.6 L Flat-6	SEB; 10†	TEX	MID	LIM	UTA	POR	AME	MOS	PET	MON	48th	7	
2010	TRG	GTC	Porsche 911 GT3 Cup	Porsche 3.8 L Flat-6	SEB	LBH	LAG	UTA	LRP	MDO; 6	ELK	MOS	PET		28th	6	
2011	TRG	GTC	Porsche 911 GT3 Cup	Porsche 3.8 L Flat-6	SEB; 2	LBH; Ret	LRP; 2	MOS; 1	MDO; 1	ELK; 2	BAL; 6	LAG; 1	PET; 3		2nd	157	
2012	TRG	GTC	Porsche 911 GT3 Cup	Porsche 3.8 L Flat-6	SEB; 4	LBH; 5	LAG	LRP; 6	MOS; 1	MDO; 2	ELK; 8	BAL; 4	VIR; 5	PET; 2	3rd	116	
2013	Flying Lizard Motorsports	GTC	Porsche 911 GT3 Cup	Porsche 4.0 L Flat-6	SEB; 2	LBH; 2	LAG; 8	**LRP**; **1**	MOS; 2	**ELK**; **1**	BAL; 7	COA; 5	VIR; 7	**PET**; **1**	2nd	139	

^{†} Did not finish the race but was classified as his car completed more than 70% of the overall winner's race distance.

=== 24 Hours of Le Mans results ===
Year	Team	Co-Drivers	Car	Class	Laps	Pos.	Class Pos.
2011	(United States) Flying Lizard Motorsports	(United States) Seth Neiman (United States) Darren Law	Porsche 997 GT3-RSR	GTE; Am	211	DNF	DNF
2012	(United States) Flying Lizard Motorsports	(United States) Seth Neiman (United States) Darren Law	Porsche 997 GT3-RSR	GTE; Am	313	27th	4th
2014	(United Kingdom) JMW Motorsport	(Saudi Arabia) Abdulaziz Al-Faisal (United States) Seth Neiman	Ferrari 458 Italia GT2	GTE; Am	327	27th	7th
2018	(Germany) Proton Competition	(United States) Patrick Long (United States) Tim Pappas	Porsche 911 RSR	GTE; Am	334	29th	4th

=== NASCAR ===
(key) (Bold – Pole position awarded by qualifying time. Italics – Pole position earned by points standings or practice time. * – Most laps led.)

==== Xfinity Series ====
NASCAR Xfinity Series results
Year	Team	No.	Make	1	2	3	4	5	6	7	8	9	10	11	12	13	14	15	16	17	18	19	20	21	22	23	24	25	26	27	28	29	30	31	32	33	NXSC	Pts	Ref
2021	JD Motorsports	6	Chevy	DAY	DAY	HOM	LVS	PHO	ATL	MAR	TAL	DAR	DOV	COA; 19	CLT	MOH	TEX	NSH	POC	ROA; 36	ATL	NHA	GLN														58th	32	
2021	JD Motorsports	0	Chevy																					IND; 24	MCH	DAY	DAR	RCH	BRI	LVS	TAL	CLT	TEX	KAN	MAR	PHO	58th	32	
2022	SS-Green Light Racing	08	Ford	DAY	CAL	LVS	PHO	ATL	COA	RCH	MAR	TAL	DOV	DAR	TEX	CLT	PIR; 29	NSH	ROA	ATL	NHA	POC	IND	MCH													68th	8	
2022	JD Motorsports	6	Chevy																						GLN; DNQ	DAY	DAR	KAN	BRI	TEX	TAL	CLT	LVS	HOM	MAR	PHO	68th	8	
2023	SS-Green Light Racing	07	Chevy	DAY	CAL	LVS	PHO	ATL	COA	RCH	MAR	TAL	DOV	DAR	CLT	POR	SON	NSH	CSC; 28	ATL	NHA	POC	ROA	MCH	IND	GLN	DAY	DAR	KAN	BRI	TEX	CLT	LVS	HOM	MAR	PHO	62nd	9	

^{*} Season still in progress

=== ARCA Re/Max Series ===
(key) (Bold – Pole position awarded by qualifying time. Italics – Pole position earned by points standings or practice time. * – Most laps led.)

ARCA Re/Max Series results
Year	Team	No.	Make	1	2	3	4	5	6	7	8	9	10	11	12	13	14	15	16	17	18	19	20	21	ARSC	Pts	Ref
2009	TRG Motorsports	09	Chevy	DAY	SLM	CAR	TAL	KEN	TOL	POC	MCH	MFD	IOW	KEN	BLN	POC	ISF	CHI	TOL	DSF	NJE; 3	SLM	KAN	CAR	101st	220	

=== Complete WeatherTech SportsCar Championship results ===
(key) (Races in bold indicate pole position; results in italics indicate fastest lap)

Year	Team	Class	Make	Engine	1	2	3	4	5	6	7	8	9	10	11	12	Pos.	Points	Ref
2014	Flying Lizard Motorsports	GTD	Audi R8 LMS ultra	Audi 5.2 L V10	DAY; 2	SEB; 8	LGA; 6	BEL; 14	WGL; 15	MOS; 10	IMS; 8	ELK; 7	VIR; 16	AUS; 7	ATL; 14		16th	232	
2015	Park Place Motorsports	GTD	Porsche 911 GT America	Porsche 4.0L Flat-6	DAY; 16	SIR; 12	LGA; 1	DET; 5	WGL; 11	LIM; 6	ELK; 3	VIR; 10	AUS; 5	PET; 1			5th	266	
2016	Change Racing	GTD	Lamborghini Huracán GT3	Lamborghini 5.2 L V10	DAY; 18	SEB; 14	LGA; 10	BEL; 6	WGL; 9	MOS; 5	**LIM**; 8	ELK; 14	VIR; 5	AUS; 9	PET; 10		9th	247	
2017	Alegra Motorsports	GTD	Porsche 911 GT3 R	Porsche 4.0 L Flat-6	DAY	SEB; 10	LBH	AUS	DET	WGL	MOS	LIM	ELK	VIR	LGA	PET	67th	21	
2018	Park Place Motorsports	GTD	Porsche 911 GT3 R	Porsche 4.0 L Flat-6	DAY	SEB	MOH	BEL	WGL	MOS	LIM	ELK	VIR	LGA	PET; 13		64th	17	
2019	Magnus Racing	GTD	Lamborghini Huracán GT3 Evo	Lamborghini 5.2 L V10	DAY; 10	SEB; 2	MOH	BEL	WGL; 7	MOS	LIM	ELK	VIR	LGA	ATL; 8		23rd	100	
2020	GRT Magnus	GTD	Lamborghini Huracán GT3 Evo	Lamborghini 5.2 L V10	DAY; 2					ATL; 12			PET; 3		SEB; 7		11th	228	
2020	Team Hardpoint	GTD	Audi R8 LMS Evo	Audi 5.2 L V10		DAY; 12	SEB; 8	ELK; 10	VIR; 13		MOH; 12	CLT; 6		LGA; 10			11th	228	
2021	Magnus Racing with Archangel Motorsports	GTD	Acura NSX GT3 Evo	Acura 3.5 L Turbo V6	DAY; 11	SEB; 4	MDO	DET	WGL; 12	WGL	LIM	ELK	LGA	LBH	VIR	PET; 6	27th	1003	
2022	Magnus Racing	GTD	Aston Martin Vantage AMR GT3	Aston Martin 4.0 L Turbo V8	DAY; 2	SEB; 6	LBH	LGA	MDO	DET	WGL; 5	MOS	LIM	ELK	VIR	PET; 14	24th	1076	
2023	Magnus Racing	GTD	Aston Martin Vantage AMR GT3	Aston Martin 4.0 L Turbo V8	DAY; 2	SEB; 9	LBH	MON	WGL; 9	MOS	LIM	ELK	VIR	IMS	PET; 17		30th	969	
2024	Magnus Racing	GTD	Aston Martin Vantage AMR GT3 Evo	Aston Martin 4.0 L Turbo V8	DAY; 23	SEB; 10			WGL; 3		ELK	VIR	IMS; 11	PET; 18			19th	1853	
2024	Heart of Racing Team	GTD	Aston Martin Vantage AMR GT3 Evo	Aston Martin 4.0 L Turbo V8			LBH; 14	LGA; 6		MOS; 1							19th	1853	
2025	Magnus Racing	GTD	Aston Martin Vantage AMR GT3 Evo	Aston Martin 4.0 L Turbo V8	DAY; 21	SEB	LBH	LGA	WGL; 17	MOS	ELK	VIR	IMS	PET; 19			50th	411	
2026	Magnus Racing	GTD	Aston Martin Vantage AMR GT3 Evo	Aston Martin AMR16A 4.0 L Turbo V8	DAY; 2			LGA	WGL; 19	MOS	ELK	VIR	IMS	PET; 5			29th	1197	
2026	Heart of Racing Team	GTD	Aston Martin Vantage AMR GT3 Evo	Aston Martin AMR16A 4.0 L Turbo V8			LBH; 10										29th	1197	
2026	RS1	GTD	Porsche 911 GT3 R (992.2)	Porsche 4.0 L Flat-6		SEB; 10											29th	1197	
