= Risi Competizione =

Italo-American auto racing team

(United States) Risi Competizione
- Founded: 1997
- Team principal(s): Giuseppe Risi
- Current series: WeatherTech SportsCar Championship
- Former series: American Le Mans Series; IMSA GT Championship; Rolex Sports Car Series
- Teams' Championships: 4 (1998, 2002, 2006, 2007)
- Drivers' Championships: 2 (2002, 2007)

Risi Competizione is an Italo-American auto racing Ferrari factory-backed team formed by Giuseppe Risi in 1997. Initially, the team had a partnership with Doyle Racing using the name Doyle-Risi Racing, but soon Giuseppe Risi took full control of the project and it was rebranded with its current name in 2000. Risi Competizione has won races and championships in the IMSA GT championship, American Le Mans Series, and Rolex Sports Car Series, as well as earning three class wins at the 24 Hours of Le Mans in 1998, 2008 and 2009. Much of Risi Competizione's success has come through the use of Ferrari machines.

== Racing history ==
Risi Competizione was initially created as a competition arm of Ferrari of Houston, a car dealership owned by Giuseppe Risi. Doyle Racing, wishing to replace their outdated Riley & Scott sports prototype, was able to use Risi's connection to Ferrari to purchase two new Ferrari 333 SPs. Risi in turn was able to promote his Houston dealership. The first of the team's 333 SPs was planned for use in the IMSA GT Championship, while the second was kept in Europe to prepare for the 24 Hours of Le Mans, to which the team had already been invited due to the success of Doyle Racing the previous year in IMSA.

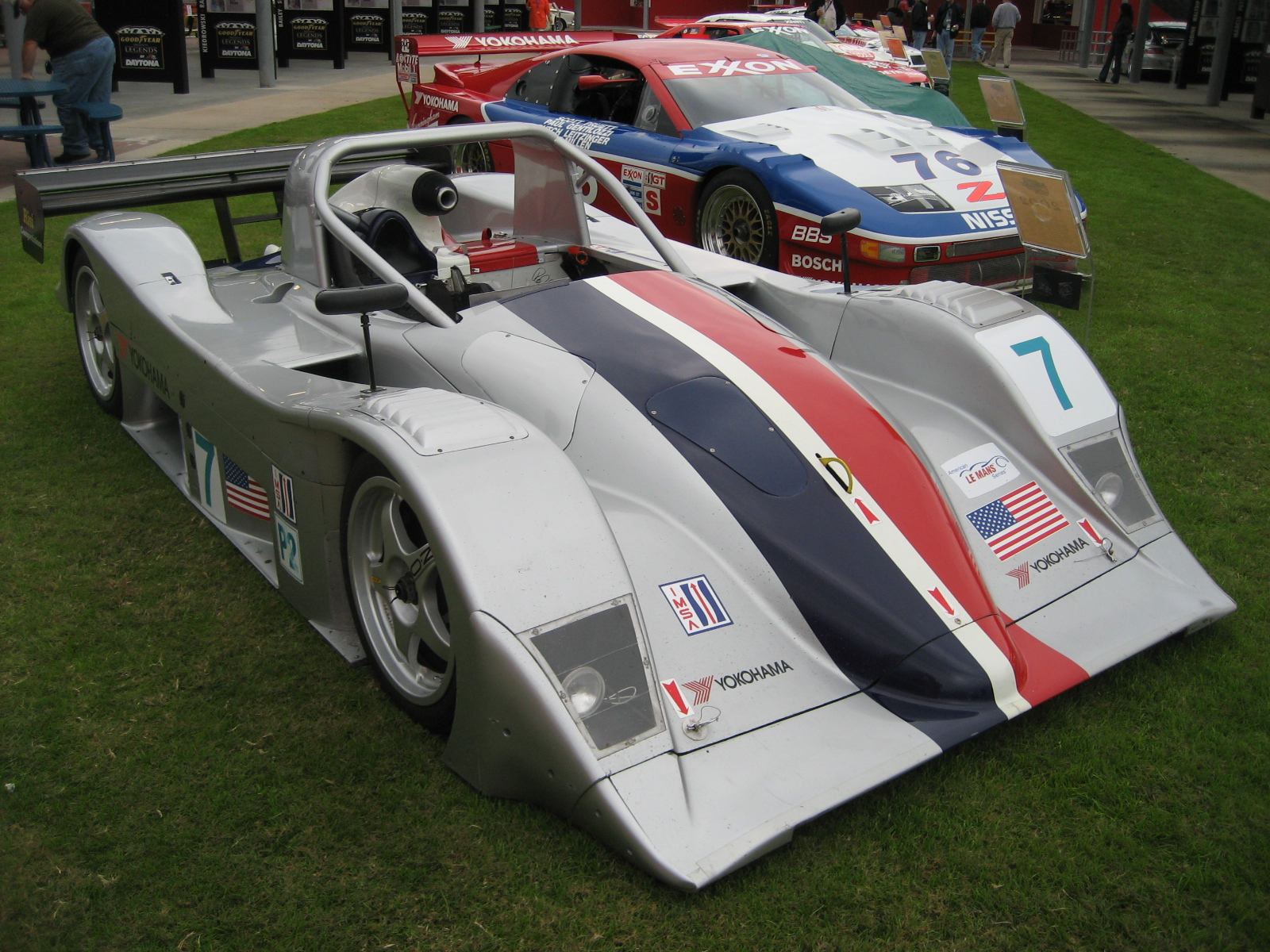
One of a pair of Lola B2K/40-Nissans which Risi Competizione ran for Rand Racing in 2002

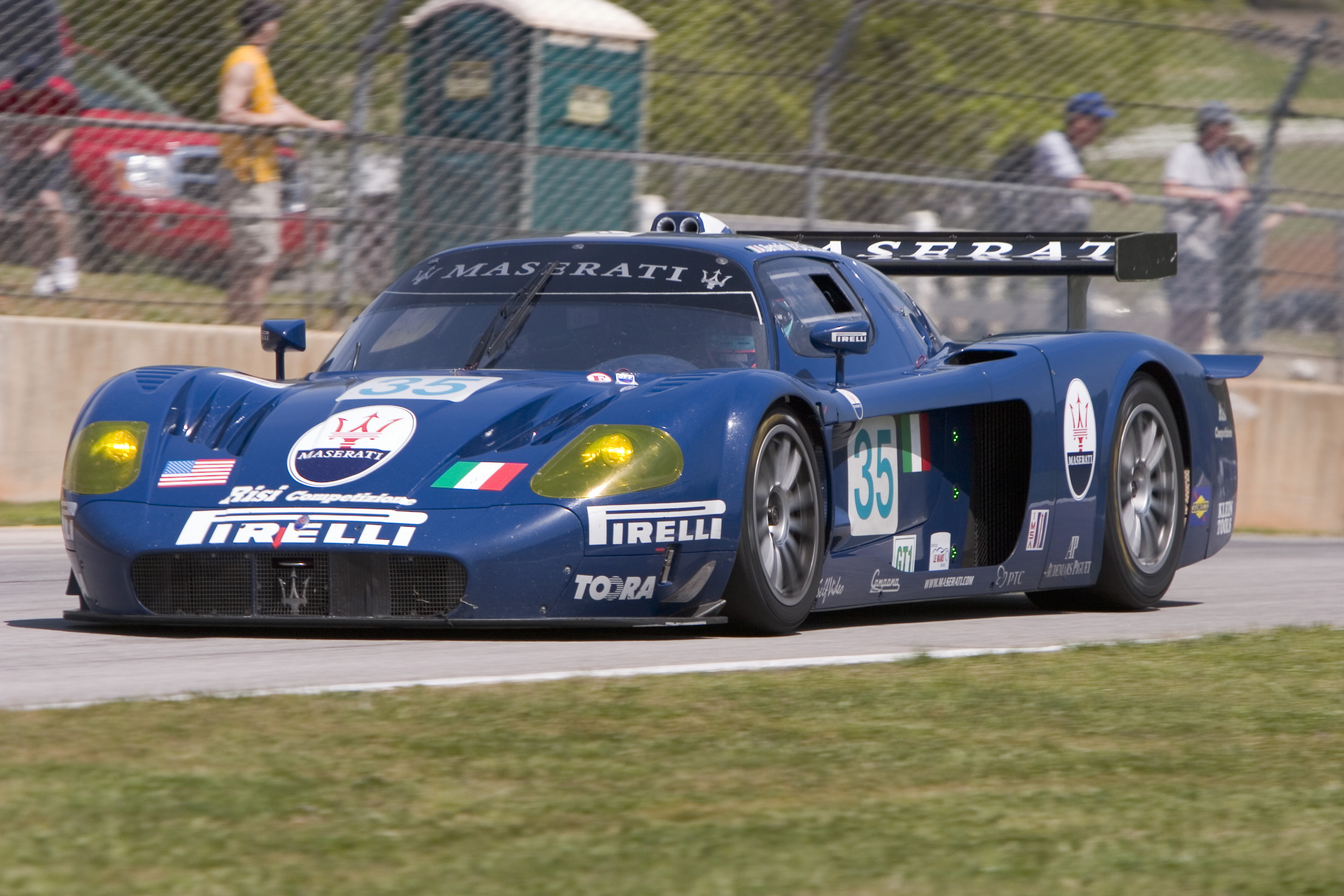
Under the Maserati Corse name, Risi ran a Maserati MC12 in the GT1 class of the American Le Mans Series.

The new partnership was able to quickly find success as the team won in only the second race of the season, drivers Wayne Taylor and Eric van de Poele earning victory at Las Vegas Motor Speedway. In Europe for Le Mans, Taylor and Van de Poele were joined by Fermín Vélez, and although they were unable to win the race overall, they scored victory in their class with an eighth-place finish. Back in the United States, Doyle-Risi earned their third victory of the year at the inaugural Petit Le Mans at Road Atlanta, winning the race overall against several teams they had competed against at Le Mans. With two victories for the year, Doyle-Risi won the team championship for the World Sports Car class, while Taylor was second and Van de Poele third in the drivers' championship.

Doyle-Risi opened the 1999 season by competing in the 24 Hours of Daytona, finishing the race in second place and only two laps behind the race winner. Doyle-Risi followed this by joining the American Le Mans Series, a replacement for the previous year's IMSA GT Championship. Both of their 333 SPs were entered for the full season. However, facing stiffer competition from Audi, BMW and Panoz, the team was unable to score any victories over the year, although they did score a season-best result of fourth at the Grand Prix of Atlanta. The team finished the season fourth in the LMP championship. Giuseppe Risi took full control of the team in 2000, rebranding it as Risi Competizione, and retained one of the 333 SPs from Doyle. Ralf Kelleners and Mimmo Schiattarella were signed, and Risi moved to the new Rolex Sports Car Series. The team earned two second-place finishes and scored fourth in the team championship. Schiattarella earned fourth in the drivers' championship, while Kelleners was sixth. In 2001, Risi entered a sole 333 SP at the 24 Hours of Daytona but failed to finish, and the team chose to not compete for the rest of the season.

During Risi's year away from competition, the company began development work on a competition version of the 360 Modena for Ferrari. Although busy with development, Risi agreed to a partnership with Rand Racing to run a pair of Nissan-powered Lola B2K/40 prototypes in the SRPII class of the Rolex Sports Car Series in 2002. The Rand-Risi team swept the ten-race season, winning their class in every event and clinching the championships. Meanwhile, Risi's 360 debuted in two of the final rounds of the American Le Mans Series season, earning podiums in their class for both races. For 2003, Risi's 360 was entered in the Daytona 24 Hours and earned second place overall, beating multiple faster prototypes. The team then moved permanently to the American Le Mans Series, running a pair of the new 360s. The team earned second place in their class championship, while Risi Competizione also returned to the 24 Hours of Le Mans for the first time since their 1998 victory, finishing in 27th place. Risi continued their development of the 360 Modena into 2004, eventually upsetting the series' Porsche dominance with a victory in their class at the New England Grand Prix. Difficulties in completing races, however, led the team to eventually finish the year fifth in the championship.

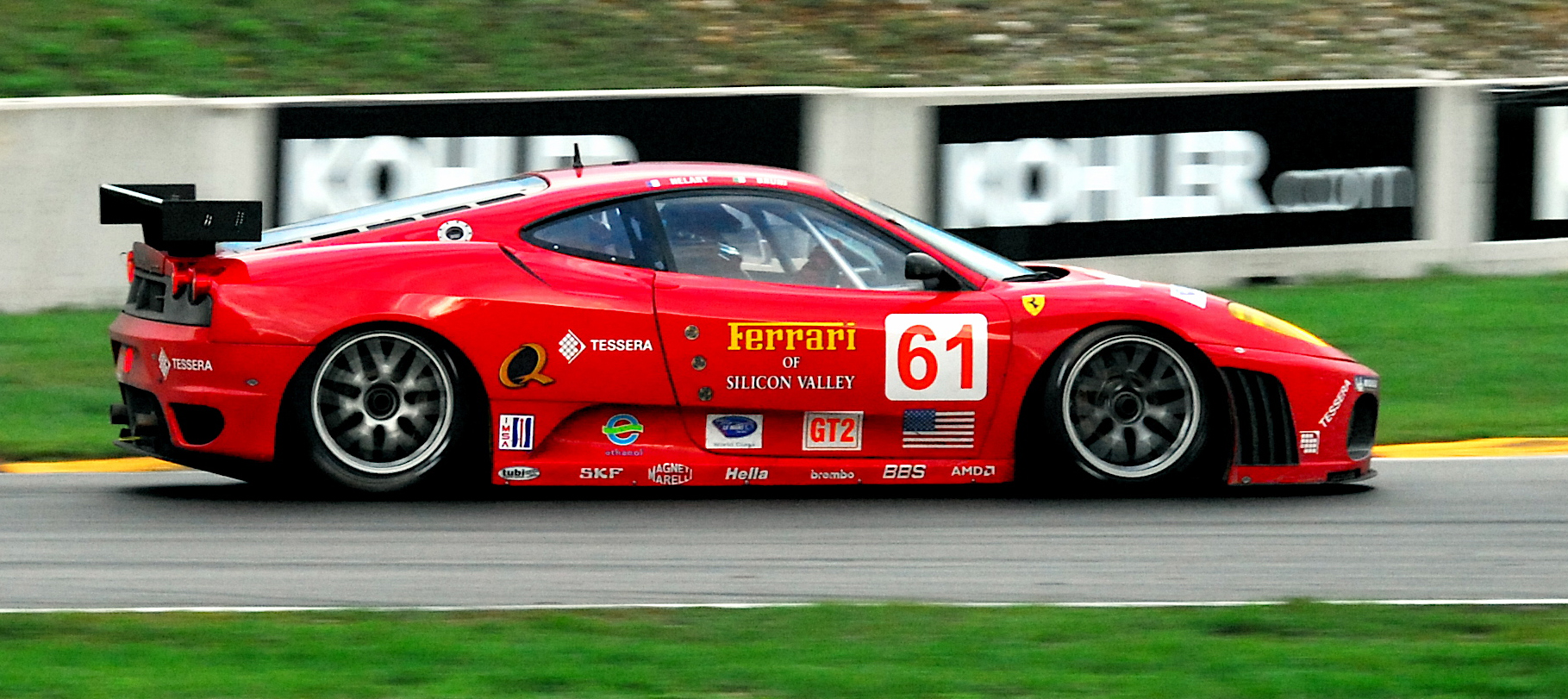
A Ferrari F430 GT2 campaigned by Risi Competizione in the 2007 American Le Mans Series season.

Now that their development of the 360 Modena was completed, Risi Competizione was chosen by Ferrari in 2005 to campaign another new car in the American Le Mans Series, this time the MC12 for Ferrari's sister brand Maserati. Running under the Maserati Corse name, the team earned several third-place finishes in their GT1 class, but due to the MC12 not complying with certain ACO & ALMS rules, the team was not able to be awarded any points in the class championship. The team returned to the GT2 class in 2006 running a replacement for the 360 Modena, the F430. Assigned factory Ferrari drivers Mika Salo and Jaime Melo, Risi Competizione earned four victories and eventually earned the team championship, although Salo finished ninth in the drivers' championship.

Risi improved over the next season, earning eight victories out of the twelve races in the American Le Mans Series, including the 12 Hours of Sebring. The team once again secured the team championship, while Salo and Melo share the drivers' championship. Both F430s also attended the 24 Hours of Le Mans for the third time in the team's history, where a car used in partnership with Krohn Racing finished 17th overall and second in the GT2 class.

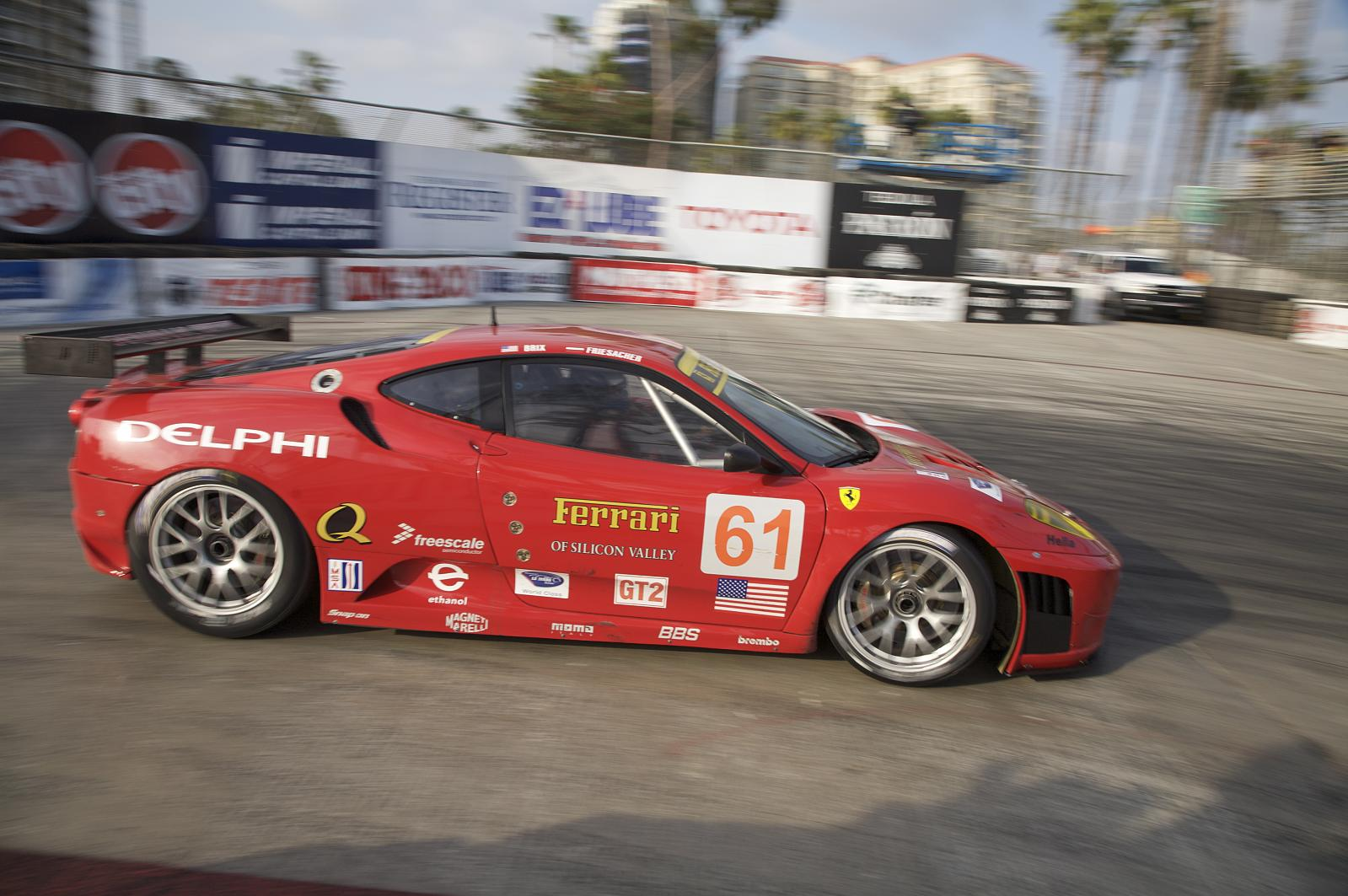
The F430 of Harrison Brix and Patrick Friesacher during the 2008 Grand Prix of Long Beach

For Risi Competizione's 2008 campaign in the American Le Mans Series, two F430s were once again in use. The team's primary car is once again piloted by defending champions Salo and Melo. The second car is used in partnership with Krohn Racing for several races during the season, but driven by Patrick Friesacher and Harrison Brix for the remainder of the events. The Risi team finished 3rd in the ALMS GT2 championship behind Krohn Racing and Flying Lizard Motorsports with Salo and Melo finishing 7th in the drivers championship.

Risi also entered the 24 Hours of Le Mans for the second year in a row, entering a Salo and Melo along with Ferrari factory driver Gianmaria Bruni in their primary car, while Krohn Racing used Tracy Krohn, Niclas Jönsson, and Eric van de Poele in their cooperative entry. Although the Krohn entry was the first retirement of the race, the main Risi entry went on to take the GT2 class victory, 19th overall. This marked their second victory at Le Mans in four attempts.

Risi kicked off the 2009 American Le Mans Series season with a GT2 class win at the 12 Hours of Sebring. Continuing competition with drivers Mika Salo and Jaime Melo. Pierre Kaffer would join the team for the longer rounds. Risi would face fierce competition all season long ending the season with only one other win at the 2009 Petit Le Mans round. With those two wins, and many strong finishes, Risi would finish 2nd in the championship behind Flying Lizard Motorsports with 137 points.

For their third straight year, Risi Competizione received an invitation and would compete in the 2009 24 Hours of Le Mans using the same driver lineup from their ALMS entry. Risi's F430 would once again overcome its rivals and take home the GT2 class victory with an 18th overall finish. Krohn Racing's F430 entered in partnership with Risi would finish 3rd in the GT2 class and 22nd overall.

In 2014, Risi competed in the GTLM class of the newly created United SportsCar Championship, running a Ferrari 458 Italia GTLM driven by Giancarlo Fisichella and Pierre Kaffer. They took class victories at Road America and Virginia, finishing the championship in 6th in GTLM with 298 points.

The following year they continued to run with the same car and drivers in the 2015 United SportsCar Championship. They failed to pick up any class wins, finishing in 4th place in GTLM in the championship with 295 points.

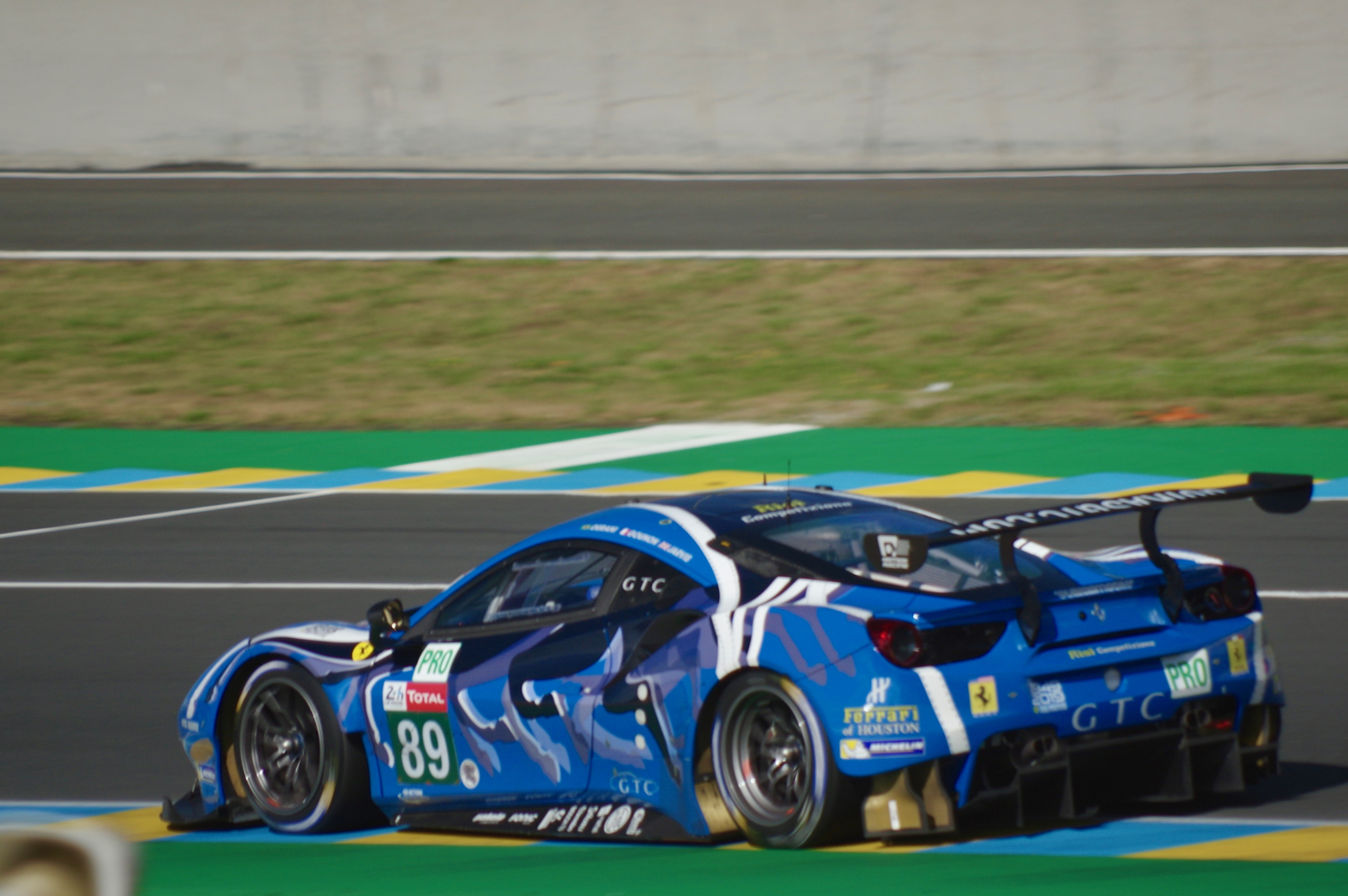
The Risi Ferrari 488 GTE at the 2019 24 Hours of Le Mans in a distinctive blue livery designed by Chloélia Breton, Louise Doublet and Andy Blackmore.

In 2016, Risi used the new Ferrari 488 GTE in the WeatherTech SportsCar Championship with a driver lineup of Giancarlo Fisichella and Toni Vilander, scoring a class win in the season finale at Petit Le Mans and finishing 5th in the championship standings. Risi once again entered the famous 24 Hours of Le Mans race where they were joined by Matteo Malucelli. The team finished second in their class.

Risi started the 2017 season in the IMSA WeatherTech SportsCar Championship with the same drivers and the same car. They repeated their Le Mans entry but failed to finish after being hit by a competitor from another class. After the 24 Hours of Le Mans, they temporarily withdrew from the IMSA series.

In 2018 Risi competed at the 24 Hours of Daytona, 12 Hours of Sebring and Petit Le Mans with Ferrari factory drivers without scoring a podium. They finish in P3 at the 24 Hours of Le Mans in GTE Am class in a Weathertech sponsored car driven by Jeroen Bleekemolen, Ben Keating and Luca Stolz.

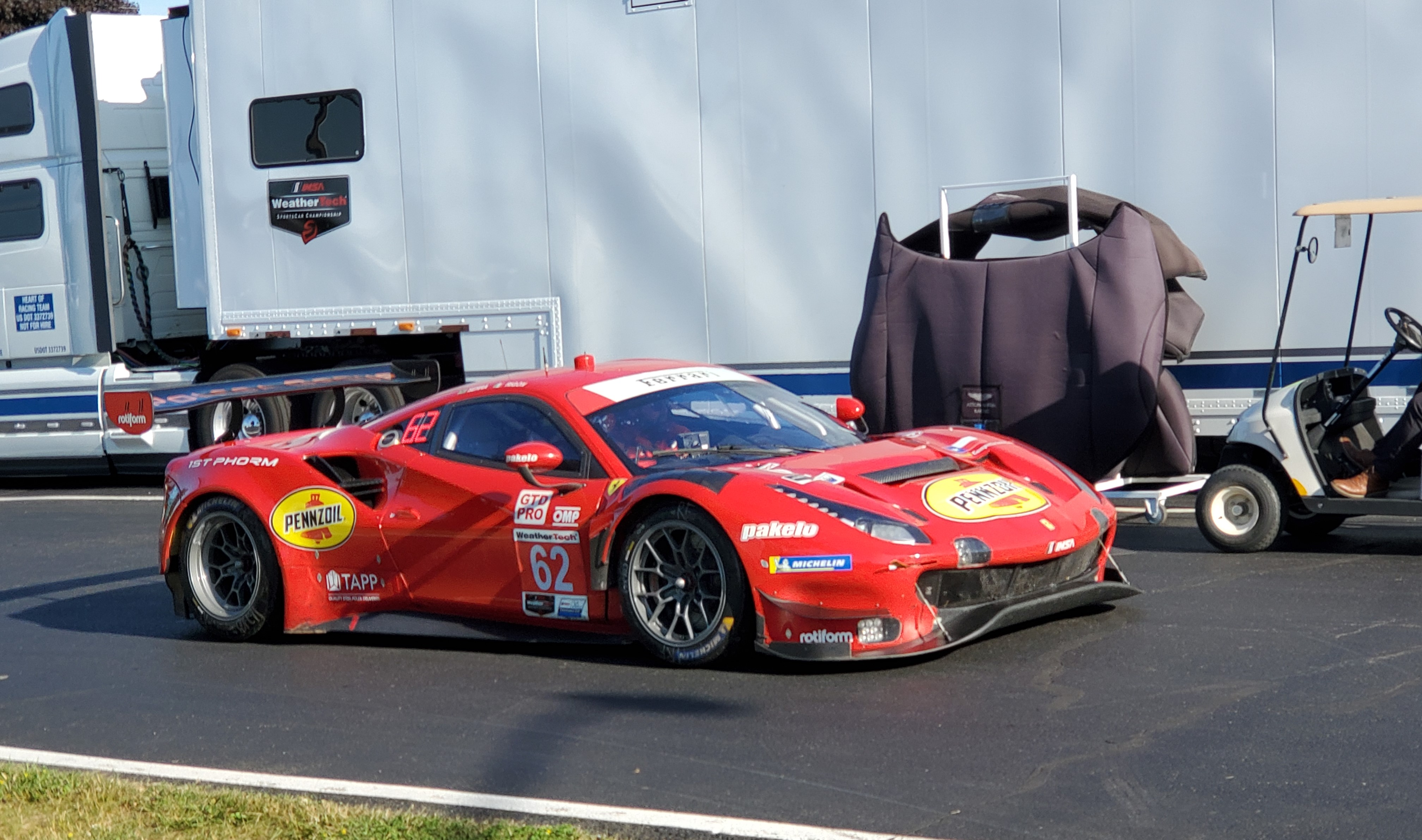
A Ferrari 488 GT3 Evo 2020 campaigned by Risi Competizione in the 2022 IMSA SportsCar Championship season.

In 2019 Risi made only 3 races, scoring a GTLM class win at MOTUL Petit Le Mans with the Le Mans-winning crew Alessandro Pier Guidi, James Calado and Daniel Serra, and a runner-up finish at the 24 Hours of Daytona with the same drivers and Davide Rigon. They raced also the 24 Hours of Le Mans with Oliver Jarvis, Jules Gounon and Pipo Derani.

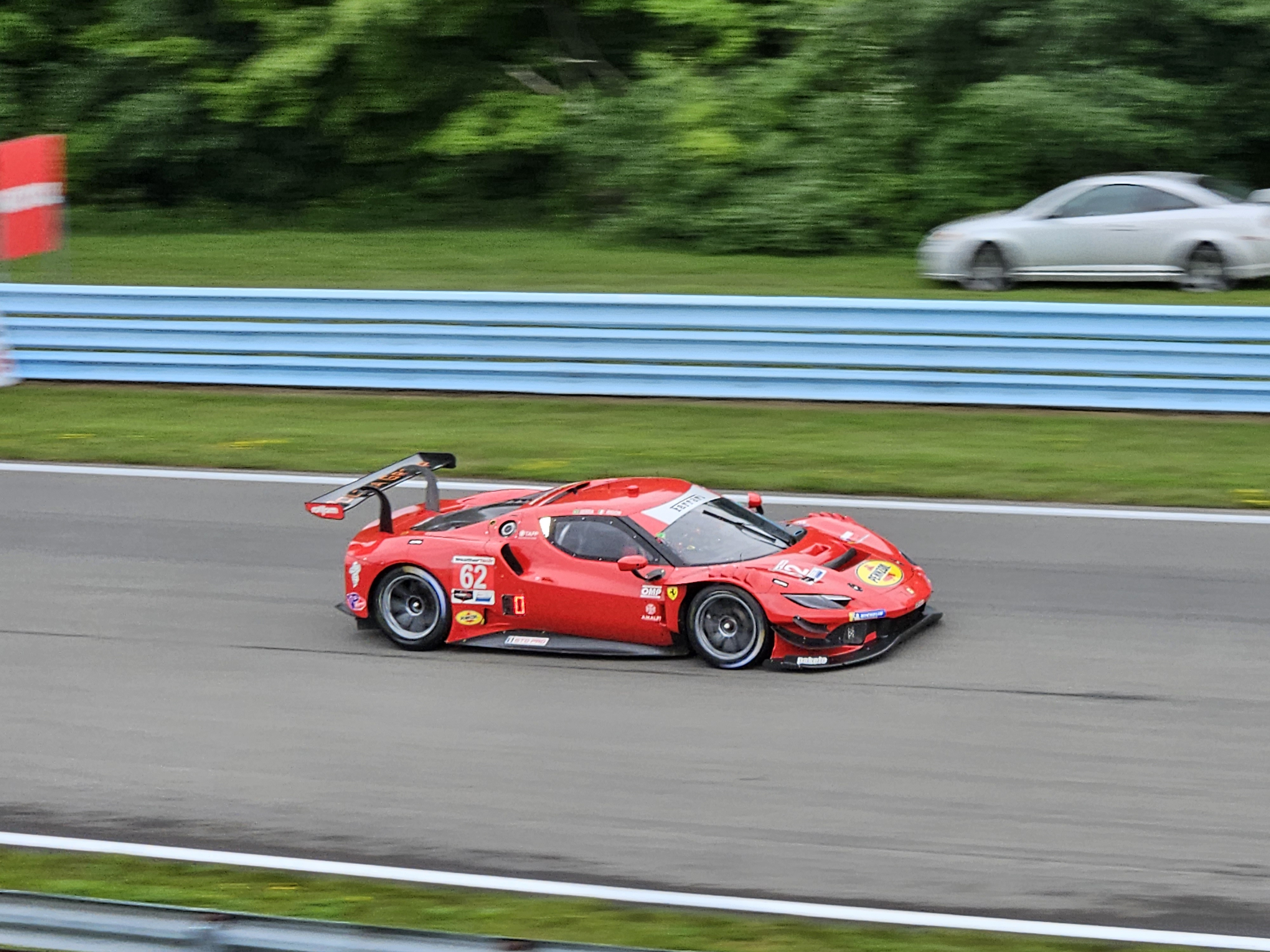
The Risi Ferrari 296 GT3 at the 2023 Sahlen's Six Hours of The Glen, a race in the 2023 IMSA SportsCar Championship season.

In 2020 Risi contest the 24 Hours of Daytona and 24 Hours of Le Mans. The team announce the participation at the 12 Hours of Sebring in March, but after the race reschedule in November due to COVID-19 pandemic the team doesn't enter the race.

In 2021 the team competed the 24 Hours of Daytona with Ferrari factory drivers Alessandro Pier Guidi, Daide Rigon and James Calado joined by Jules Gounon.

With the introduction of the GTD Pro class replacing GTLM, Risi Competizione increased the IMSA commitment to the full Michelin Endurance Cup schedule, winning the 2022 endurance cup teams and drivers title with Davide Rigon and Daniel Serra with a Ferrari 488 GT3. The squad also lost Petit Le Mans GTD Pro class victory over drive time violation.

In 2023 the team gave the race debut to the Ferrari 296 GT3 at the 24 Hours of Daytona, and scored two GTD Pro class podium at the 6 Hours of Watkins Glen and Petit Le Mans.

On 28th January 2024, Risi Competizione won the 24 Hours of Daytona for the first time in team's history with a Ferrari 296 GT3 in the GTD Pro class driven by Ferrari factory drivers James Calado, Alessandro Pier Guidi, Davide Rigon and Daniel Serra.

== Racing record ==
=== 24 Hours of Daytona results ===
Year	Entrant	No	Car	Drivers	Class	Laps	Pos.	Class Pos.
1998	(United States) Doyle-Risi Racing	17	Ferrari 333 SP	(South Africa) Wayne Taylor (Belgium) Eric van de Poele (Spain) Fermín Vélez	CA	225	DNF	DNF
1999	(United States) Doyle-Risi Racing	7	Ferrari 333 SP	(United Kingdom) Allan McNish (Belgium) Didier de Radiguès (Italy) Max Angelelli (South Africa) Wayne Taylor	CA	706	**2nd**	**2nd**
2000	(United States) Risi Competizione	12	Ferrari 333 SP	(Italy) Alex Caffi (United Kingdom) Allan McNish (Germany) Ralf Kelleners (Italy) Domenico Schiattarella	SR	162	DNF	DNF
2001	(United States) Risi Competizione	12	Ferrari 333 SP	(Germany) Ralf Kelleners (United Kingdom) Allan McNish (Australia) David Brabham (Belgium) Eric van de Poele	SRP	462	DNF	DNF
2002	(United States) Risi Competizione	13	Ferrari 333 SP	(United States) Anthony Lazzaro (Germany) Ralf Kelleners (United States) Terry Borcheller	SRP	455	DNF	DNF
2002	(United States) Rand Racing/Risi Competizione	8	Lola B2K/40-Nissan	(United States) Anthony Lazzaro (United States) Bill Rand (United States) Terry Borcheller (Germany) Ralf Kelleners	SRP II	695	**3rd**	**1st**
2003	(United States) Risi Competizione	35	Ferrari 360 Modena GT	(Germany) Ralf Kelleners (United States) Anthony Lazzaro (United Kingdom) Johnny Mowlem	GT	686	**2nd**	**2nd**
2004	(United States) Risi Competizione	30	Maserati Trofeo Light	(United States) Anthony Lazzaro (Germany) Ralf Kelleners (Italy) Matteo Bobbi	GT	462	26th	11th
2012	(United States) Risi Competizione	62	Ferrari 458 Italia	(United States) Anthony Lazzaro (Germany) Ralf Kelleners (Italy) Matteo Bobbi	GT	154	DNF	DNF
2012	(United States) Risi Competizione	63	Ferrari 458 Italia	(Monaco) Olivier Beretta (Italy) Andrea Bertolini (Finland) Toni Vilander	GT	726	15th	5th
2014	(United States) Risi Competizione	62	Ferrari 458 Italia GT2	(Italy) Gianmaria Bruni (Italy) Giancarlo Fisichella (Italy) Matteo Malucelli (Monaco) Olivier Beretta	GTLM	88	DNF	DNF
2015	(United States) Risi Competizione	62	Ferrari 458 Italia GT2	(Italy) Giancarlo Fisichella (Germany) Pierre Kaffer (Italy) Davide Rigon (Monaco) Olivier Beretta	GTLM	310	DNF	DNF
2016	(United States) Risi Competizione	62	Ferrari 488 GTE	(Italy) Giancarlo Fisichella (Finland) Toni Vilander (Italy) Davide Rigon (Monaco) Olivier Beretta	GTLM	709	12th	6th
2017	(United States) Risi Competizione	62	Ferrari 488 GTE	(Italy) Giancarlo Fisichella (United Kingdom) James Calado (Finland) Toni Vilander	GTLM	652	7th	**3rd**
2018	(United States) Risi Competizione	62	Ferrari 488 GTE	(United Kingdom) James Calado (Italy) Alessandro Pier Guidi (Italy) Davide Rigon (Finland) Toni Vilander	GTLM	774	16th	5th
2018	(United States) Risi Competizione	82	Ferrari 488 GT3	(Mexico) Santiago Creel (Mexico) Martin Fuentes (Republic of Ireland) Matt Griffin (Spain) Miguel Molina (Mexico) Ricardo Pérez de Lara	GTD	715	39th	17th
2019	(United States) Risi Competizione	62	Ferrari 488 GTE	(United Kingdom) James Calado (Italy) Alessandro Pier Guidi (Spain) Miguel Molina (Italy) Davide Rigon	GTLM	571	11th	**2nd**
2020	(United States) Risi Competizione	62	Ferrari 488 GTE Evo	(United Kingdom) James Calado (Italy) Alessandro Pier Guidi (Italy) Davide Rigon (Brazil) Daniel Serra	GTLM	738	DNF	DNF
2021	(United States) Risi Competizione	62	Ferrari 488 GTE	(United Kingdom) James Calado (France) Jules Gounon (Italy) Alessandro Pier Guidi (Italy) Davide Rigon	GTLM	769	14th	4th
2022	(United States) Risi Competizione	62	Ferrari 488 GT3 Evo 2020	(United Kingdom) James Calado (Italy) Alessandro Pier Guidi (Italy) Davide Rigon (Brazil) Daniel Serra	GTD Pro	711	19th	**2nd**
2023	(United States) Risi Competizione	62	Ferrari 296 GT3	(United Kingdom) James Calado (Italy) Alessandro Pier Guidi (Italy) Davide Rigon (Brazil) Daniel Serra	GTD Pro	349	DNF	DNF
2024	(United States) Risi Competizione	62	Ferrari 296 GT3	(United Kingdom) James Calado (Italy) Alessandro Pier Guidi (Italy) Davide Rigon (Brazil) Daniel Serra	GTD Pro	733	17th	**1st**
2025	(United States) DragonSpeed	81	Ferrari 296 GT3	(Spain) Albert Costa (Spain) Miguel Molina (France) Thomas Neubauer (Italy) Davide Rigon	GTD Pro	723	21st	6th
2026	(United States) Risi Competizione	62	Ferrari 296 GT3 Evo	(Italy) Alessandro Pier Guidi (Italy) Davide Rigon (Brazil) Daniel Serra	GTD Pro	62	DNF	DNF

=== 24 Hours of Le Mans results ===
Year	Entrant	No	Car	Drivers	Class	Laps	Pos.	Class Pos.
1998	(United States) Doyle-Risi Racing	12	Ferrari 333 SP	(South Africa) Wayne Taylor (Belgium) Eric van de Poele (Spain) Fermín Vélez	LMP1	332	8th	**1st**
2003	(United States) Risi Competizione	94	Ferrari 360 Modena GT	(United States) Terry Borcheller (Germany) Ralf Kelleners (United States) Anthony Lazzaro	LMGT	269	26th	8th
2003	(United States) Risi Competizione	95	Ferrari 360 Modena GT	(United States) Butch Leitzinger (United States) Shane Lewis (United Kingdom) Johnny Mowlem	LMGT	138	DNF	DNF
2007	(United States) Risi Competizione	97	Ferrari F430 GT2	(Brazil) Jaime Melo (United Kingdom) Johnny Mowlem (Finland) Mika Salo	LMGT2	223	DNF	DNF
2007	(United States) Risi Competizione (United States) Krohn Racing	99	Ferrari F430 GT2	(United States) Colin Braun (Sweden) Niclas Jönsson (United States) Tracy Krohn	LMGT2	314	19th	**2nd**
2008	(United States) Risi Competizione	82	Ferrari F430 GT2	(Italy) Gianmaria Bruni (Brazil) Jaime Melo (Finland) Mika Salo	LMGT2	326	19th	**1st**
2008	(United States) Risi Competizione (United States) Krohn Racing	83	Ferrari F430 GT2	(Sweden) Niclas Jönsson (United States) Tracy Krohn (Belgium) Eric van de Poele	LMGT2	12	DNF	DNF
2009	(United States) Risi Competizione	82	Ferrari F430 GT2	(Germany) Pierre Kaffer (Brazil) Jaime Melo (Finland) Mika Salo	LMGT2	329	18th	**1st**
2009	(United States) Risi Competizione (United States) Krohn Racing	83	Ferrari F430 GT2	(Sweden) Niclas Jönsson (United States) Tracy Krohn (Belgium) Eric van de Poele	LMGT2	323	22nd	**3rd**
2010	(United States) Risi Competizione	82	Ferrari F430 GT2	(Italy) Gianmaria Bruni (Germany) Pierre Kaffer (Brazil) Jaime Melo	LMGT2	116	DNF	DNF
2010	(United States) Risi Competizione (United States) Krohn Racing	83	Ferrari F430 GT2	(Sweden) Niclas Jönsson (United States) Tracy Krohn (Belgium) Eric van de Poele	LMGT2	197	DNF	DNF
2016	(United States) Risi Competizione	82	Ferrari 488 GTE	(Italy) Giancarlo Fisichella (Italy) Matteo Malucelli (Finland) Toni Vilander	LMGTE Pro	340	19th	**2nd**
2017	(United States) Risi Competizione	82	Ferrari 488 GTE	(Italy) Giancarlo Fisichella (Germany) Pierre Kaffer (Finland) Toni Vilander	LMGTE Pro	72	DNF	DNF
2018	(United States) Keating Motorsports	85	Ferrari 488 GTE	(Netherlands) Jeroen Bleekemolen (United States) Ben Keating (Germany) Luca Stolz	LMGTE Am	334	28th	**3rd**
2019	(United States) Risi Competizione	89	Ferrari 488 GTE Evo	(Brazil) Pipo Derani (France) Jules Gounon (United Kingdom) Oliver Jarvis	LMGTE Pro	329	40th	11th
2020	(United States) Risi Competizione	82	Ferrari 488 GTE Evo	(France) Sébastien Bourdais (France) Jules Gounon (France) Olivier Pla	LMGTE Pro	339	23rd	4th
2021	(United States) Risi Competizione	82	Oreca 07-Gibson	(Republic of Ireland) Ryan Cullen (United Kingdom) Oliver Jarvis (Brazil) Felipe Nasr	LMP2	275	DNF	DNF

=== American Le Mans Series results ===
(key) Races in bold indicates pole position. Races in italics indicates fastest lap.

Year	Entrant	Class	Chassis	Engine	No	Drivers	Rds.	Rounds												Pos.	Pts.
Year	Entrant	Class	Chassis	Engine	No	Drivers	Rds.	1	2	3	4	5	6	7	8	9	10	11	12	Pos.	Pts.
2003	(United States) Risi Competizione	GT	Ferrari 360 Modena GT	Ferrari 3.6L V8	34	(United Kingdom) Marino Franchitti (United Kingdom) Kevin McGarrity (United Kingdom) Phillip Bennett	1; 1; 1	SEB; Ret	ATL	SON	TRO	MOS	RDA	LGA	MIA	PET				2nd	96
2003	(United States) Risi Competizione	GT	Ferrari 360 Modena GT	Ferrari 3.6L V8	35	(Germany) Ralf Kelleners (United States) Anthony Lazzaro (United States) Terry Borcheller	All; All; 1	SEB; Ret	ATL; Ret	SON; 3	TRO; 2	MOS; 2	RDA; Ret	LGA; 3	MIA; 2	PET; 3				2nd	96
2004	(United States) Risi Competizione	GT	Ferrari 360 Modena GTC	Ferrari 3.6L V8	35	(Germany) Ralf Kelleners (United States) Anthony Lazzaro (Italy) Matteo Bobbi (Italy) Fabrizio de Simone	1-6, 8-9; 1-6, 8-9; 1; 8	SEB; 7	MID; Ret	LIM; 1	SON; 4	POR; Ret	MOS; 4	AME	PET; 4	MON; 4				5th	79
2005	(Italy) Maserati Corse (United States) Risi Competizione	GT1	Maserati MC12 GT1	Maserati 6.0L V12	35	(Italy) Andrea Bertolini (Italy) Fabrizio de Simone (Italy) Fabio Babini (Finland) Mika Salo	1-5, 7-10; 1-3, 5-10; 1, 4, 9; 6	SEB; 5	ATL; 3	MOH; 5	LIM; 4	SON; 4	POR; 4	RDA; 3	MOS; 4	PET; 4	LGA; Ret			NC	0
2006	(United States) Risi Competizione	GT2	Ferrari F430 GT2	Ferrari 4.0L V8	61	(Finland) Toni Vilander (Germany) Ralf Kelleners (Spain) Marc Gené (Italy) Maurizio Mediani (United States) Anthony Lazzaro (United Kingdom) Marino Franchitti (Italy) Andrea Bertolini	4, 7-8; 4; 7; 8-10; 9; 9; 10	SEB	REL	MOH	LIM; Ret	MIL	POR	RDA; 4	MOS; 2	PET; 2	LGA; 7			1st	161
2006	(United States) Risi Competizione	GT2	Ferrari F430 GT2	Ferrari 4.0L V8	62	(Brazil) Jaime Melo (Germany) Ralf Kelleners (United States) Anthony Lazzaro (Finland) Mika Salo (Mexico) Mario Dominguez (Spain) Marc Gené (Monaco) Stéphane Ortelli (United Kingdom) Johnny Mowlem (Finland) Markus Palttala	1-3, 5-6; 1, 9; 1; 2-3, 5-6, 10; 4, 7; 4; 7-10; 8; 9	SEB; 3	REL; 3	MOH; 6	LIM; 5	MIL; 1	POR; 1	RDA; 7	MOS; 1	PET; Ret	LGA; 1			1st	161
2007	(United States) Risi Competizione	GT2	Ferrari F430 GT2	Ferrari 4.0L V8	61	(Sweden) Niclas Jönsson (United States) Tracy Krohn (United States) Colin Braun (Argentina) José María López (United States) Anthony Lazzaro (France) Éric Hélary (Italy) Gianmaria Bruni (United Kingdom) Darren Turner	1-6, 11-12; 1, 4, 11-12; 1; 2; 3; 5-10; 7-10; 11	SEB; 9	STP; DNS	LBH; 3	REL; Nc	MIL; 4	LIM; 3	MOH; 3	RDA; 6	MOS; 2	DET; 4	PET; Nc	LGA; 8	1st	223
2007	(United States) Risi Competizione	GT2	Ferrari F430 GT2	Ferrari 4.0L V8	62	(Brazil) Jaime Melo (Finland) Mika Salo (United Kingdom) Johnny Mowlem	All; All; 1, 11	SEB; 1	STP; 1	LBH; 1	REL; 1	MIL; 9	LIM; 9	MOH; 2	RDA; 1	MOS; 1	DET; 1	PET; 6	LGA; 1	1st	223
2008	(United States) Risi Competizione	GT2	Ferrari F430 GT2	Ferrari 4.0L V8	61	(Sweden) Niclas Jönsson (United States) Tracy Krohn (Belgium) Eric van de Poele (United States) Harrison Brix (Austria) Patrick Friesacher (United Kingdom) Robert Bell	1, 10-11; 1, 10-11; 1, 10; 2-7, 9; 2-6; 7, 9	SEB; 3	STP; 5	LBH; 6	MIL; 7	LIM; 6	MOH; 6	RDA; 6	MOS	DET; 5	PET; 4	LGA; 12		3rd	159
2008	(United States) Risi Competizione	GT2	Ferrari F430 GT2	Ferrari 4.0L V8	62	(Brazil) Jaime Melo (Finland) Mika Salo (Italy) Gianmaria Bruni	All; All; 1	SEB; Ret	STP; 10	LBH; 9	MIL; Ret	LIM; 3	MOH; 5	RDA; 5	MOS; 1	DET; 3	**PET**; **1**	LGA; 2		3rd	159
2009	(United States) Risi Competizione (United States) Krohn Racing	GT2	Ferrari F430 GT2	Ferrari 4.0L V8	61	(Sweden) Niclas Jönsson (United States) Tracy Krohn (Belgium) Eric van de Poele	1; 1; 1	SEB; 6	STP	LBH	UTA	LRP	MDO	ELK	MOS	PET	LAG			2nd	137
2009	(United States) Risi Competizione	GT2	Ferrari F430 GT2	Ferrari 4.0L V8	62	(Germany) Pierre Kaffer (Brazil) Jaime Melo (Finland) Mika Salo	All; All; 1, 9	SEB; 1	**STP**; **Ret**	LBH; 2	UTA; 3	**LRP**; **2**	MDO; 5	ELK; 5	MOS; 2	PET; 1	LAG; Ret			2nd	137
2010	(United States) Risi Competizione	GT	Ferrari F430 GT2	Ferrari 4.0L V8	61	(Finland) Toni Vilander (Italy) Giancarlo Fisichella (Finland) Mika Salo (Germany) Pierre Kaffer	4, 6; 4, 6; 5, 7; 5, 7	SEB	LBH	LAG	UTA; 6	LRP; 4	**MDO**; **10†**	ELK; 7	MOS	PET				3rd	150
2010	(United States) Risi Competizione	GT	Ferrari F430 GT2	Ferrari 4.0L V8	62	(Italy) Gianmaria Bruni (Brazil) Jaime Melo (Germany) Pierre Kaffer (Finland) Toni Vilander	All; 1-7, 9; 1; 8	SEB; 1	**LBH**; **4**	**LAG**; **4**	**UTA**; **1**	LRP; Ret	MDO; 1	ELK; 6	MOS; 2	PET; 3				3rd	150
2011	(United States) Risi Competizione	GT	Ferrari 458 Italia GT2	Ferrari F142 4.5 L V8	62	(Brazil) Jaime Melo (Finland) Toni Vilander (Finland) Mika Salo (Brazil) Raphael Matos	All; All; 1; 9	SEB; 11†	LBH; 3	LRP; Ret	MOS; 2	MDO; Ret	ELK; 1	BAL; 5	LAG; 6	PET; DNS				5th	83
2013	(United States) Risi Competizione	GT	Ferrari 458 Italia GT2	Ferrari F142 4.5 L V8	62	(Monaco) Olivier Beretta (Italy) Matteo Malucelli (Italy) Gianmaria Bruni (United Kingdom) Robin Liddell	1-4, 6-10; 1-4, 6-10; 1; 10	**SEB**; **2**	LBH; 9	**LAG**; **8**	LRP; 10†	MOS	ELK; 10	BAL; Ret	COA; 6	VIR; 1	**PET**; **3**			4th	73

^{†} Did not finish the race but was classified as the car completed more than 70% of the winner's race distance.

=== IMSA SportsCar Championship results ===
(key) Races in bold indicates pole position. Races in italics indicates fastest lap.

Year	Entrant	Class	Chassis	Engine	No	Drivers	Rds.	Rounds											Pos.	Pts.	EC
Year	Entrant	Class	Chassis	Engine	No	Drivers	Rds.	1	2	3	4	5	6	7	8	9	10	11	Pos.	Pts.	EC
2014	(United States) Risi Competizione	GTLM	Ferrari 458 Italia GT2	Ferrari F142 4.5 L V8	62	(Italy) Giancarlo Fisichella (Italy) Gianmaria Bruni (Italy) Matteo Malucelli (Monaco) Olivier Beretta (United States) Dane Cameron (Germany) Pierre Kaffer	All; 1-2; 1-2; 1, 11; 3; 4-11	DAY; 11	SEB; 11	LBH; 9	LGA; 3	WGL; 7	MOS; 10	**IMS**; **2**	ELK; 1	**VIR**; **1**	COA; 4	ATL; 11	6th	298	-
2015	(United States) Risi Competizione	GTLM	Ferrari 458 Italia GT2	Ferrari F142 4.5 L V8	62	(Italy) Giancarlo Fisichella (Germany) Pierre Kaffer (Monaco) Olivier Beretta (Italy) Davide Rigon (Italy) Andrea Bertolini (Finland) Toni Vilander	All; All; 1; 1; 2; 10	DAY; 9	SEB; 2	LBH; 2	LGA; 4	WGL; 5	MOS; 6	ELK; 3	VIR; 3	COA; 2	ATL; 5		4th	293	25
2016	(United States) Risi Competizione	GTLM	Ferrari 488 GTE	Ferrari F154CB 3.9 L Turbo V8	62	(Italy) Giancarlo Fisichella (Finland) Toni Vilander (Italy) Davide Rigon (Monaco) Olivier Beretta (United Kingdom) James Calado	All; All; 1-2; 1; 11	DAY; 6	SEB; 4	LBH; 3	LGA; 5	WGL; 6	MOS; 7	LIM; 4	ELK; 5	VIR; 7	COA; 8	ATL; 1	5th	305	32
2017	(United States) Risi Competizione	GTLM	Ferrari 488 GTE	Ferrari F154CB 3.9 L Turbo V8	62	(Italy) Giancarlo Fisichella (Finland) Toni Vilander (United Kingdom) James Calado (Italy) Alessandro Pier Guidi	1-4, 9-11; 1-4, 9-11; 1-2; 11	DAY; 3	SEB; 3	LBH; 9	COA; 9	WGL	MOS	LIM	ELK	VIR; 3	**LGA**; **2**	**ATL**; **3**	9th	199	16
2018	(United States) Risi Competizione	GTLM	Ferrari 488 GTE	Ferrari F154CB 3.9 L Turbo V8	62	(Finland) Toni Vilander (United Kingdom) James Calado (Italy) Alessandro Pier Guidi (Italy) Davide Rigon (Italy) Andrea Bertolini (Spain) Miguel Molina	1-2, 11; 1-2; 1-2; 1; 11; 11	DAY; 5	SEB; 5	LBH	MOH	WGL	MOS	LIM	ELK	VIR	LGA	ATL; 9	9th	74	19
2018	(United States) Risi Competizione	GTD	Ferrari 488 GT3	Ferrari F154CB 3.9 L Turbo V8	82	(Mexico) Santiago Creel (Mexico) Martin Fuentes (Republic of Ireland) Matt Griffin (Spain) Miguel Molina (Mexico) Ricardo Pérez de Lara	1; 1; 1; 1; 1	DAY; 17	SEB	MDO	DET	WGL	MOS	LIM	ELK	VIR	LGA	PET	22nd	14	8
2019	(United States) Risi Competizione	GTLM	Ferrari 488 GTE Evo	Ferrari F154CB 3.9 L Turbo V8	62	(United Kingdom) James Calado (Italy) Alessandro Pier Guidi (Spain) Miguel Molina (Italy) Davide Rigon (Brazil) Daniel Serra	1, 11; 1, 11; 1; 1; 11	DAY; 2	SEB	LBH	MOH	WGL	MOS	LIM	ELK	VIR	LGA	**ATL**; **1**	9th	67	29
2020	(United States) Risi Competizione	GTLM	Ferrari 488 GTE Evo	Ferrari F154CB 3.9 L Turbo V8	62	(United Kingdom) James Calado (Italy) Alessandro Pier Guidi (Italy) Davide Rigon (Brazil) Daniel Serra	1; 1; 1; 1	DAY1; 6	DAY2	SEB1	ELK	VIR	ATL1	MOH	CLT	ATL2	LGA	SEB2	7th	25	8
2021	(United States) Risi Competizione	GTLM	Ferrari 488 GTE Evo	Ferrari F154CB 3.9 L Turbo V8	62	(United Kingdom) James Calado (France) Jules Gounon (Italy) Alessandro Pier Guidi (Italy) Davide Rigon	1; 1; 1; 1	DAY; 4	SEB	DET	WGL1	WGL2	LIM	ELK	LGA	LBH	VIR	ATL	7th	308	8
2022	(United States) Risi Competizione	GTD Pro	Ferrari 488 GT3 Evo 2020	Ferrari F154CB 3.9 L Turbo V8	62	(Italy) Davide Rigon (Brazil) Daniel Serra (United Kingdom) James Calado (Italy) Alessandro Pier Guidi (Italy) Edward Cheever	1-2, 5, 10; 1-2, 5, 10; 1, 10; 1; 2	DAY; 2	**SEB**; **9**	LBH	LGA	WGL; 2	MOS	LIM	ELK	VIR	ATL; 7†		7th	1213	55
2023	(United States) Risi Competizione	GTD Pro	Ferrari 296 GT3	Ferrari F163CE 3.0 L Turbo V6	62	(Italy) Davide Rigon (Brazil) Daniel Serra (Italy) Alessandro Pier Guidi (United Kingdom) James Calado (Brazil) Gabriel Casagrande	1-2, 5, 11; 1-2, 5, 11; 1, 11; 1; 2	DAY; 10	SEB; 6	LBH	MON	**WGL**; **2**	MOS	LIM	ELK	VIR	IMS	PET; 3	6th	1192	28
2024	(United States) Risi Competizione	GTD Pro	Ferrari 296 GT3	Ferrari F163CE 3.0 L Turbo V6	62	(Italy) Davide Rigon (Brazil) Daniel Serra (United Kingdom) James Calado (Italy) Alessandro Pier Guidi	1-2, 5, 9-10; 1-2, 6, 9-10; 1-2; 1, 10	DAY; 1	SEB; 2	LGA	DET	**WGL**; **11**	MOS	ELK	VIR	IMS; 9	PET; 2		10th	1540	41
2026	(United States) Risi Competizione	GTD Pro	Ferrari 296 GT3 EVo	Ferrari F163CE 3.0 L Turbo V6	62	(Italy) Alessandro Pier Guidi (Italy) Davide Rigon (Brazil) Daniel Serra	1; 1; 1	DAY; 15	SEB	LGA	DET	WGL	MOS	ELK	VIR	IMS	ATL		15th*	183*	8*

^{*} Season still in progress
†: Post-event penalty. Car moved to back of class.
