= Anthony Lazzaro (racing driver) =

American racecar driver (born 1963)

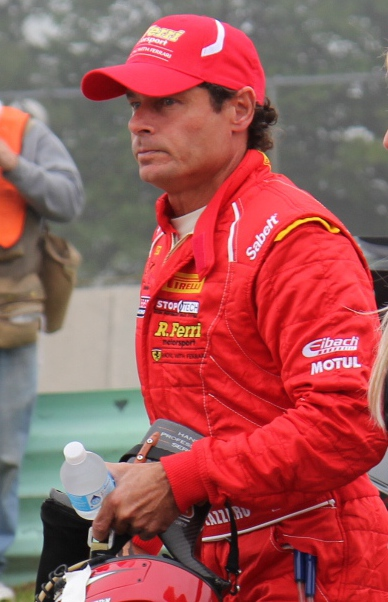
- Lazzaro, 2014 Pirelli World Challenge race at Road America
- Nationality: (United States) American
- Born: August 26, 1963 (age 63) Charleston, South Carolina, U.S.

United SportsCar Championship
- Categorisation: FIA Gold (until 2015); FIA Silver (2016–2018); FIA Bronze (2019–)
- Years active: 2014–2015
- Teams: Extreme Speed Motorsports, Scuderia Corsa, CORE Autosport
- Starts: 5
- Wins: 14
- Poles: 0
- Fastest laps: 0
- Best finish: 25th in 2015

Previous series
- 1999–2013 1998–2013 2001–2002 2001, 2005 2000, 2003 2000 1999 1996–1999: American Le Mans Series; Rolex Sports Car Series; Indy Racing League; Nextel Cup Series; Busch Series; Craftsman Truck Series; ARCA Bondo/Mar-Hyde Series; Toyota Atlantic

Championship titles
- 1999: Toyota Atlantic

NASCAR Cup Series career
- 2 races run over 2 years
- Best finish: 66th (2001)
- First race: 2001 Global Crossing at the Glen (Watkins Glen)
- Last race: 2005 Sirius Satellite Radio at the Glen (Watkins Glen)
Wins	Top tens	Poles
0	0	0

NASCAR O'Reilly Auto Parts Series career
- 11 races run over 2 years
- Best finish: 55th (2000)
- First race: 2000 Alltel 200 (Rockingham)
- Last race: 2003 Mr. Goodcents 300 (Kansas
Wins	Top tens	Poles
0	0	0

NASCAR FedEx Freight Truck Series career
- 1 race run over 1 year
- Best finish: 91st (2000)
- First race: 2000 Sears Craftsman 175 (Chicago)
Wins	Top tens	Poles
0	0	0

IndyCar Series career
- 6 races run over 2 years
- Best finish: 30th (2002)
- First race: 2001 Gateway Indy 250 (Gateway)
- Last race: 2002 Gateway Indy 250 (Gateway)
Wins	Podiums	Poles
0	0	0

24 Hours of Le Mans career
- Years: 2003
- Teams: Risi Competizione
- Best finish: 26th
- Class wins: 0

Anthony Lazzaro (born August 26, 1963) is an American NASCAR and sports car racing driver. He is usually classified as a NASCAR road course ringer; however, he has made other starts in the Nextel Cup Series. He also has open-wheel oval racing experience.

== Racing career ==
Lazzaro started in karting, winning numerous World Karting Association championships between 1987 and 1992.

Lazzaro came-up through the open-wheel ranks, first racing in the Olds Pro Series in 1993, winning at Road Atlanta, Watkins Glen, Dallas and again at Road Atlanta. He won the pole at Mid Ohio and a podium finish of third with other podium finishes at the Moroso National S2000 and at Trois Rivieres. He was also the Hooter Formula Cup Champion in 1995, winning six of the fourteen races and nine poles.

As a rookie in 1996, in the Toyota Atlantic Series, Lazzaro won the race at the Milwaukee Mile. He won races in 1997 (Homestead-Miami Speedway) and 1998 (Road America, Laguna Seca Raceway, Houston). His rise culminated in a Toyota Atlantic championship in 1999. That year, he won four races (Nazareth, Gateway International Raceway, Trois-Rivieres, Laguna Seca Raceway).

Lazzaro first began racing stock cars in the ARCA in 1999. At the ARCA event at the Talladega Superspeedway that year, Lazzaro was injured in a multi-car wreck late in the race after he made contact with Bill Baird and spun down to the grass, before his Thunderbird lifted off the ground and slammed the third turn banking before being t-boned by Skip Smith. Lazzaro suffered a compression fracture of the thoracic T3 vertebra in the crash that eliminated half a dozen cars.

In 2000, Lazzaro raced ten Busch Series races for PPI Motorsports. He was planned to move up to Cup with the No. 96 McDonald's team. However, after a lack of results, he was released, and replaced by Andy Houston.

Besides the stint in the Busch Series, Lazzaro has raced mainly road course races, giving him the label of a road course ringer.

Lazzaro also made six starts in the Indy Racing League in 2001 and 2002 for Sam Schmidt Motorsports with a best finish of ninth.

In addition, Lazzaro has had success in sports car racing. He won the GT3 class in the 24 Hours of Daytona in 1999, co-driving a Porsche 911. In 2002 he finished third in the SPII class after winning seven races. In 2003, he was fifth at the GT class of the American Le Mans Series, collecting six podiums with a Risi Ferrari 360. He took a GT win in the 2004 race at Lime Rock Park with Ralf Kelleners and ended seventh in the GT class. He made his debut in the 24 Hours of Le Mans in 2003, also racing a Ferrari.

In 2013, Lazzaro got three podiums in the LMP2 class of the ALMS with Extreme Speed Motorsports. He also competed in the Rolex Sports Car Series driving a GT class Ferrari 458. With four podiums, he ended fourth in the drivers championship. He switched to the SCCA World Challenge for 2014, where he races a Ferrari 458.

== Motorsports career results ==
=== SCCA National Championship Runoffs ===
Year	Track	Car	Engine	Class	Finish	Start	Status
1993	Road Atlanta	Van Diemen RF93	Ford	Formula Ford	1	1	Running
1993	Road Atlanta	Shannon 93PS	Ford	Sports 2000	27	2	Retired

=== American Open Wheel ===
(key)1995 Hooters Formula Cup champion with 6 wins and 9 pole positions.

==== Indy Racing League ====
(key) (Races in bold indicate pole position)

Year	Team	Chassis	No.	Engine	1	2	3	4	5	6	7	8	9	10	11	12	13	14	15	Pos.	Pts	Ref
2001	Sam Schmidt Motorsports	Dallara IR-01	44	Oldsmobile Aurora V8	PHX	HMS	ATL	INDY	TXS	PPR	RIR	KAN	NSH	KTY	GAT; 18	CHI				38th	29	
2001	Sam Schmidt Motorsports	Dallara IR-01	99	Oldsmobile Aurora V8													TXS; 13			38th	29	
2002	Sam Schmidt Motorsports	Dallara IR-02	99	Chevrolet Indy V8	HMS; 9	PHX; 17	FON	NAZ; 9	INDY; DNQ	TXS										30th	70	
2002	Sam Schmidt Motorsports	Dallara IR-02	55	Chevrolet Indy V8							PPR; 22	RIR	KAN	NSH	MCH	KTY				30th	70	
2002	Sam Schmidt Motorsports	Dallara IR-02	20	Chevrolet Indy V8													GAT; DNS	CHI	TXS	30th	70	

=== Complete 24 Hours of Le Mans results ===
Year	Team	Co-Drivers	Car	Class	Laps	Pos.	Class Pos.
2003	(United States) Risi Competizione	(Germany) Ralf Kelleners (United States) Terry Borcheller	Ferrari 360 Modena GT	GT	269	26th	8th

=== NASCAR ===
(key) (Bold – Pole position awarded by qualifying time. Italics – Pole position earned by points standings or practice time. * – Most laps led.)

==== Nextel Cup Series ====
NASCAR Nextel Cup Series results
Year	Team	No.	Make	1	2	3	4	5	6	7	8	9	10	11	12	13	14	15	16	17	18	19	20	21	22	23	24	25	26	27	28	29	30	31	32	33	34	35	36	NNCC	Pts	Ref
2001	TWC Motorsports	68	Chevy	DAY	CAR	LVS	ATL	DAR	BRI	TEX	MAR	TAL	CAL	RCH	CLT	DOV	MCH	POC	SON; DNQ	DAY	CHI	NHA	POC	IND	GLN; 34	MCH	BRI	DAR	RCH	DOV	KAN	CLT	MAR	TAL	PHO	CAR	HOM	ATL	NHA	66th	61	
2005	R&J Racing	37	Dodge	DAY	CAL	LVS	ATL	BRI	MAR	TEX	PHO	TAL	DAR	RCH	CLT	DOV	POC	MCH	SON	DAY	CHI	NHA	POC	IND	GLN; 28	MCH	BRI	CAL	RCH	NHA	DOV	TAL	KAN	CLT	MAR	ATL	TEX	PHO	HOM	73rd	79	

==== Busch Series ====
NASCAR Busch Series results
Year	Team	No.	Make	1	2	3	4	5	6	7	8	9	10	11	12	13	14	15	16	17	18	19	20	21	22	23	24	25	26	27	28	29	30	31	32	33	34	NBSC	Pts	Ref
2000	PPI Motorsports	97	Ford	DAY	CAR; 29	LVS; DNQ	ATL; 42	DAR; 34	BRI; 43	TEX; DNQ	NSV; 25	TAL; DNQ	CAL; 26	RCH; 30	NHA; 27	CLT; DNQ	DOV	SBO	MYB		MLW; 32	NZH	PPR	GTY	IRP	MCH	BRI	DAR	RCH	DOV	CLT	CAR	MEM	PHO	HOM			55th	718	
2000	SABCO Racing	82	Chevy																	GLN; 16																		55th	718	
2003	PPM Racing	03	Ford	DAY	CAR	LVS	DAR	BRI	TEX	TAL	NSH	CAL	RCH	GTY	NZH	CLT	DOV	NSH	KEN	MLW	DAY	CHI	NHA	PPR	IRP	MCH	BRI	DAR	RCH	DOV	KAN; 25	CLT	MEM	ATL	PHO	CAR	HOM	127th	88	

==== Craftsman Truck Series ====
NASCAR Craftsman Truck Series results
Year	Team	No.	Make	1	2	3	4	5	6	7	8	9	10	11	12	13	14	15	16	17	18	19	20	21	22	23	24	NCTC	Pts	Ref
2000	Billy Ballew Motorsports	32	Ford	DAY	HOM	PHO	MMR	MAR	PIR	GTY	MEM	PPR	EVG	TEX	KEN	GLN	MLW	NHA	NZH	MCH	IRP	NSV	CIC; 22	RCH	DOV	TEX	CAL	91st	97	

=== ARCA Bondo/Mar-Hyde Series ===
(key) (Bold – Pole position awarded by qualifying time. Italics – Pole position earned by points standings or practice time. * – Most laps led.)

ARCA Bondo/Mar-Hyde Series results
Year	Team	No.	Make	1	2	3	4	5	6	7	8	9	10	11	12	13	14	15	16	17	18	19	20	21	ABSC	Pts	Ref
1999	Hover Motorsports	80	Ford	DAY	ATL	SLM	AND	CLT	MCH	POC	TOL	SBS	BLN	POC	KIL	FRS	FLM	ISF	WIN	DSF	SLM	CLT	TAL; 17	ATL	106th	145	

=== WeatherTech SportsCar Championship results ===
(key)(Races in bold indicate pole position, Results are overall/class)

Year	Team	Class	Make	Engine	1	2	3	4	5	6	7	8	9	10	11	Rank	Points
2014	Extreme Speed Motorsports	P	HPD ARX-03b	Honda HR28TT 2.8 L V6 Turbo	DAY; 7	SIR	LBH	LGA	DET	WGL; 11	MSP	IMS	ELK	COA	PET	38th	46
2015	CORE Autosport	PC	Oreca FLM09	Chevrolet LS3 6.2 L V8	DAY	SEB	LGA	BEL	WGL	MOS	LIM	ELK	AUS	ATL; 4		32	29
2015	Scuderia Corsa	GTD	Ferrari 458 Italia GT3	Ferrari 4.5L V8	DAY; 6	SEB; 3	LGA	BEL	WGL	LIM	ELK	VIR	AUS	PET		25th	57

Sporting positions
Preceded by Lee Bentham	Toyota Atlantic Champion; 1999	Succeeded by Buddy Rice
