= 2012 12 Hours of Sebring =

Sports car endurance race held at Sebring International Raceway, Sebring, Florida, USA

Track map of the Sebring International Raceway

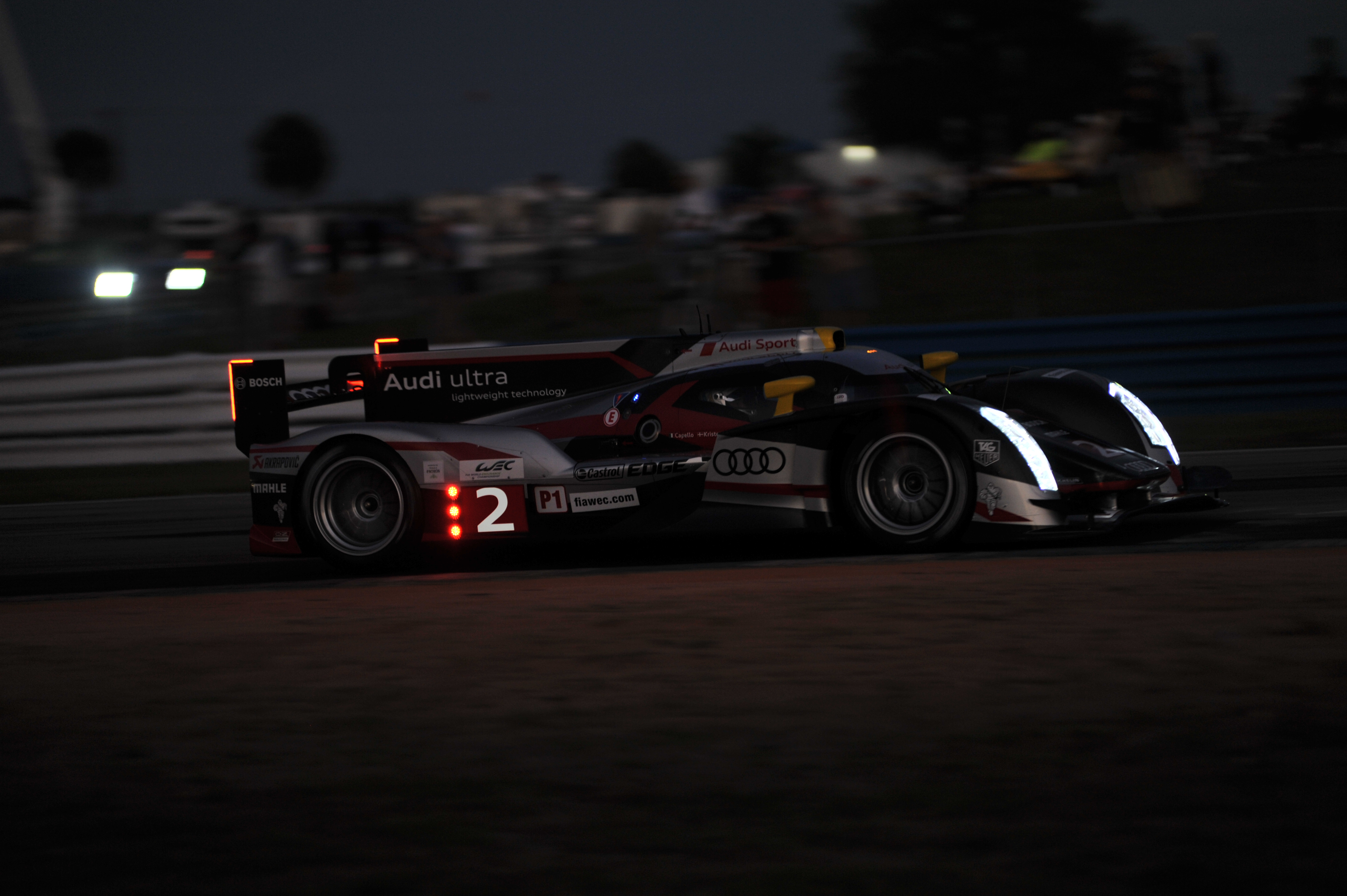
The race-winning No. 2 Audi R18 TDI

The 60th Annual Mobil 1 Twelve Hours of Sebring was a 12-hour automobile endurance race for teams of three drivers each fielding sports prototype and grand touring cars held on March 17, 2012, at the Sebring International Raceway in Sebring, Florida before more than 90,000 spectators. It was the 60th 12 Hours of Sebring and the first round of both the 2012 FIA World Endurance Championship (WEC) and the 2012 American Le Mans Series (ALMS). Le Mans Prototype 1 (LMP1), Le Mans Prototype 2 (LMP2), Le Mans Prototype Challenge (LMPC), Le Mans Grand Touring Endurance (LMGTE), and Grand Touring Challenge (GTC) cars competed in the race.

An Audi R18 TDI shared by Marcel Fässler, André Lotterer and Benoît Tréluyer started from pole position after Lotterer set the fastest overall lap time during qualifying. The car lost the race lead on the opening lap to a sister Audi driven by Rinaldo Capello, Tom Kristensen, and Allan McNish. The trio led all but 66 laps and finished first, four laps ahead of their teammates Timo Bernhard, Romain Dumas, and Loïc Duval. It was Kristensen's sixth Sebring victory, Capello's fifth, McNish's fourth and Audi's tenth. Ryan Dalziel, Enzo Potolicchio and Stéphane Sarrazin of Starworks Motorsport's HPD ARX-03b car in third overall won the WEC LMP2 category and the Level 5 Motorsports HPD entry of João Barbosa, Christophe Bouchut and Scott Tucker won the ALMS' P2 class. The Pescarolo Team of Jean-Christophe Boullion, Emmanuel Collard, and Julien Jousse in a Pescarolo 01 car completed the WEC LMP1 class podium. The only classified finisher in the ALMS' P1 category was Chris Dyson, Steven Kane, and Guy Smith in a Lola B12/60 car.

The CORE Autosport Oreca FLM09 vehicle shared by Burt Frisselle, Alex Popow and E. J. Viso won the PC class by one lap over the PR1/Mathiasen Motorsports team of Ken Dobson, Rudy Junco Jr. and Butch Leitzinger. BMW Team RLL's trio of Joey Hand, Dirk Müller and Jonathan Summerton in a BMW M3 GT2 overcame a final lap collision with an AF Corse entered Ferrari 458 Italia GT2 to win the GT class from Corvette Racing's C6.R entry of Antonio García, Jan Magnussen and Jordan Taylor. After losing the opportunity to win outright in GT due to a last lap spin, AF Corse's Olivier Beretta, Andrea Bertolini, and Marco Cioci won the LMGTE Pro category. The LMGTE Am class was led by the No. 50 Larbre Compétition Corvette until driver Pedro Lamy suffered a driveshaft failure in the final hour, handing the victory to Team Felbermayr-Proton's Porsche 997 GT3-RSR of Christian Ried, Gianluca Roda and Paolo Ruberti. Alex Job Racing won their eighth Sebring category with Townsend Bell, Dion von Moltke, and Bill Sweedler's Porsche 997 GT3 Cup leading the GTC category by one lap over teammates Louis-Philippe Dumoulin, Leh Keen, and Cooper MacNeil.

== Background ==
=== Preview ===
The 2012 12 Hours of Sebring was the opening round of both the 2012 American Le Mans Series (ten races) and the 2012 FIA World Endurance Championship (eight races), as well as the race's 60th running. It was the first and only event involving both the American Le Mans Series (ALMS) and the FIA World Endurance Championship (WEC), the only North American round of the WEC season, and the series' debut race. On March 17, 2012, the round was held at the 17-turn 3.74 mi (6.02 km) Sebring International Raceway road course in Sebring, Florida. The event was sanctioned by the International Motor Sports Association (IMSA), with officials from both the ALMS and the WEC on site.

=== Entry list ===
The Fédération Internationale de l'Automobile (FIA) track homologation meant that the event had a 64-car entry limit. Only full-season ALMS and WEC entries were permitted to compete, and no one-time entries were permitted due to the combined ALMS and WEC field. The race included five car types: Le Mans Prototype 1 (LMP1), Le Mans Prototype 2 (LMP2), Le Mans Prototype Challenge (LMPC), Le Mans Grand Touring Endurance (LMGTE), and Grand Touring Challenge (GTC). The nine car categories racing at Sebring were the ALMS' P1, P2, PC, GT, GTC, and the WEC's LMP1, LMP2, LMGTE Pro, and LMGTE Am. The race's defending winners, Peugeot, did not return to defend their title after withdrawing from endurance racing. Audi Sport Team Joest (the only factory LMP1 manufacturer after Peugeot's withdrawal) fielded three one-year-old R18 TDI cars, while Rebellion Racing entered two 2011 Lola B11/60s. OAK Racing and Pescarolo Team each entered a 2011 Pescarolo 01, while JRM, Muscle Milk Pickett Racing and Strakka Racing each entered one HPD ARX-03a. The Lola B12/60 made its début at Sebring, and Dyson Racing Team fielded one. Toyota did not enter its TS030 Hybrid car due to time constraints.

LMP2 had 13 teams from five different manufacturers. Oreca had three 03 cars in LMP2 run by Pecom Racing, ADR-Delta, and Signatech Nissan. Lola Cars also fielded three B12/80s, with two from Gulf Racing Middle East, and one by Lotus. There were also three HPD ARX-03b cars with two run by Level 5 Motorsports, and one by Starworks Motorsport. OAK Racing and Conquest Endurance each entered a single Morgan LMP2 car. Greaves Motorsport also fielded one Zytek Z11SN car. The one-make PC class included nine Oreca FLM09 vehicles, including two from CORE Autosport. PR1 Mathiasen Racing, Muscle Milk Pickett Racing, Performance Tech Motorsports, RSR Racing, and Dempsey Racing each ran one car.

The WEC LMGTE field included twelve cars from four different manufacturers, with five in the Pro category and seven in the Am class. AF Corse was the only two-car team in LMGTE Pro, with two Ferrari 458 Italias, while Luxury Racing had one. There was one Aston Martin Vantage GTE from Aston Martin Racing and one Porsche 997 GT3-RSR from Team Felbermayr-Proton. Ferrari had three cars in LMGTE Am, with one 458 Italia entered by Krohn Racing, Luxury Racing, and AF-Corse-Waltrip. Larbre Compétition fielded two Chevrolet Corvette C6.Rs, and JWA-Avila and Felbermayr-Proton each fielded one Porsche 997 GT3-RSR. The ten-car ALMS GT field featured two C6.Rs from Corvette Racing, two Ferrari 458 Italias from Extreme Speed Motorsports (ESM), four Porsche 997 GTE-RSRs from Flying Lizard Motorsports (two) and Team Falken Tire and Paul Miller Racing (one each), and two BMW M3 GT2s from Team RLL. Risi Competizione missed Sebring due to the economic climate and the resulting lack of preparation. The one-make GTC class included nine Porsche 997 GT3 Cup cars. Alex Job Racing (AJR) and NGT Motorsports had two cars and one each by Green Hornet Racing, JDX Racing, Competition Motorsports, GMG Racing, and TRG.

=== Balance of performance changes ===
The balance of performance goal for both the ALMS and the WEC was to achieve parity in all classes. The Audi R18 TDi's performance was lowered because its air restrictor was 7% smaller, its turbocharger boost was reduced, and it lost 5 L (1.1 imp gal; 1.3 US gal) in fuel capacity. The GT-category Chevrolet Corvette C6.R received a 0.4 mm (0.016 in) larger air restrictor and more flexibility in its rear wing placement, as did the Aston Martin Vantage GTE and the BMW M3 GT2. The WEC LMGTE Am-class Porsche 997 GTE-RSR lost 25 kg (55 lb) of ballast, while the Black Swan Lola B11/80 gained 20 kg (44 lb) of ballast, affecting their handling.

== Testing ==
The teams had two four-hour test sessions on March 12 and two one-hour test sessions the next day. On the first day, 61 of the 64 entered cars competed, with Audi leading with a 1:47.187 lap set by Allan McNish's No. 2 car. During the afternoon session, McNish's co-driver Tom Kristensen damaged the No. 2 car's front-left corner in a collision with Romain Dumas' sister No. 3 vehicle. The No. 1 Audi was four-tenths of a second faster than the No. 3 entry, which was more than a second slower. The highest-placed petrol-powered car was the No. 6 Muscle Milk HPD entry in fourth. Level 5's No. 95 car led LMP2 in the afternoon session with a time of 1:52.055, almost 1.5 seconds faster than the sister No. 055 entry. On the bumpy turn 17, OAK team owner Jacques Nicolet lost control of the No. 24 Morgan car, which incurred severe damage in a high-speed accident. Luxury's No. 59 Ferrari set the quickest afternoon session lap at 2:00.830. The No. 45 Flying Lizard Porsche was 0.325 seconds slower, while Dominik Farnbacher's No. 58 Luxury Ferrari led LMGTE Am with a 2:02.893 lap time. Dempsey Racing topped LMPC with a 1:55.540 lap time from PR1 Mathiasen Racing, while Green Hornet's No. 34 car led the GTC class with a time of 2:06.899 from NGT Motorsport's No. 30 car.

Testing's second day saw all 64 cars compete, and Audi again led with Kristensen's lap of 1:48.138, 0.272 seconds quicker than Timo Bernhard's No. 3 car. The No. 1 Audi was third after a lap by Marcel Fässler and the highest-placed ALMS LMP1 entry was the fourth-placed Muscle Milk HPD car. Soheil Ayari's No. 49 Pecom Oreca car led LMP2 with a 1:53.527 lap in the afternoon session. After a lap by João Barbosa, the No. 055 Level 5 car was second and the top ALMS LMP2 entry, and Ryan Dalziel's No. 44 Starworks HPD entry was third, the top three LMP2 cars were within 0.362 seconds of each other. Giancarlo Fisichella's No. 51 AF Corse Ferrari led GT with a 2:01.097 lap, 0.043 seconds faster than Jaime Melo's No. 59 Luxury car. The top ALMS GT entry was Flying Lizard's No. 45 Porsche. Krohn's No. 57 Ferrari led LMGTE Am with a 2:02.991 lap time from Niclas Jönsson. Colin Braun lapped quickest in the LMPC-class CORE entry at 1:55.473, while Sean Edwards's No. 30 NGT car set the fastest GTC lap at 2:07.841.

== Practice ==
The first practice session lasted one hour and was held on March 15 in the morning. Dumas was fastest at 1:48.626, 1.136 seconds ahead of Klaus Graf's highest-placed No. 6 Muscle Milk ALMS LMP1 entry. Graf was three-seconds ahead of Fässler in third and Andrea Belicchi's No. 13 Rebellion Lola was fourth overall. Barbosa set the quickest LMP2 lap of 1:52.680 for Level 5. John Martin's No. 25 ADR-Delta Oreca was second, 0.404 seconds slower, with the second Level 5 car third. David Heinemeier Hansson spun and stranded the No. 37 Conquest car at turn ten, stopping practice for five minutes. Practice was stopped again when Scott Tucker crashed the No. 055 Level 5 entry into the turn 17 tire barrier. Nine cars came within a second of Oliver Gavin's No. 4 Corvette's quickest GT lap of 2:01.514. With Jonathan Summerton's quickest lap, the No. 56 RLL BMW was second, and Toni Vilander's No. 51 AF Corse Ferrari was third, separated by a tenth of a second. Farnbacher led LMGTE Am with a 2:02.988 lap, followed by Paolo Ruberti's No. 88 Felbermayr-Proton Porsche and Krohn's No. 57 Ferrari of Jönsson. Muscle Milk's Memo Gidley led LMPC with a 1:55.881 lap, 0.137 seconds quicker than No. 6 CORE's Alex Popow. Michael Guasch's No. 5 Muscle Milk car stopped at turn ten, resulting in a five-minute delay. Alex Job's No. 022 car led GTC with Leh Keen's 2:07.308 lap, ahead of Henrique Cisneros' No. 30 NGT car.

The second practice session, during that afternoon, lasted an hour in clear, windy conditions. The three Audis led, with André Lotterer's No. 1 car fastest in 1:47.761, ahead of Dumas and Rinaldo Capello's No. 2 entry. Guillaume Moreau's No. 15 OAK Pescarolo and Graf were fourth and fifth, respectively. Nick Leventis stopped practice when his No. 21 Strakka car stopped on track before a collision between an unknown Prototype and GT car caused another stoppage. The No. 95 HPD of Ryan Hunter-Reay lapped fastest in 1:53.094 late in the session, 0.322 seconds faster than Level 5 teammate Christophe Bouchut's No. 055 car. Martin Plowman's No. 37 Conquest Morgan was third in class. Gianmaria Bruni paced GT with a lap of 2:00.034 in AF Corse's No. 51 Ferrari. Bill Auberlen's No. 155 RLL BMW was 0.360 seconds slower in second place. Pedro Lamy's No. 50 Larbre Corvette improved the fastest LMGTE Am lap to a 2:02.747, leaving Farnbacher over a second behind. Pablo Sanchez's No. 7 Merchant car led LMPC in 1:55.573, ahead of Raphael Matos' No. 18 Performance Tech car. Edwards' No. 30 NGT car led GTC with a 2:06.819 lap, 0.358 seconds faster than Damien Faulkner's Green Hornet entry.

That evening, a single one-hour and 45-minute practice session was scheduled. Kristensen set the quickest lap late in the session, 1:47.049, ahead of teammates Lotterer and Loïc Duval's No. 3 Audi, and Graf and David Brabham's No. 22 JRM HPD car. With a 1:51.824 lap, Stéphane Sarrazin's Starworks HPD vehicle led LMP2 ahead of OAK's No. 24 entry of Olivier Pla and Hunter-Reay. Joey Hand's best GT lap of 2:00.258 was 0.065 seconds faster than Bruni's. Farnbacher led LMGTE Am with a lap of 2:01.864, half a second faster than Jönsson. Matos (1:56.789) was 0.127 seconds faster than Sanchez in LMPC. TRG's Spencer Pumpelly topped GTC with a lap of 2:07.623 from Green Hornet's Sebastiaan Bleekemolen. A CORE LMPC car spun the No. 31 NGT Porsche in the hairpin, forcing Nick Heidfeld's No. 12 Rebellion to stop in heavy traffic at the exit to avoid contact. Duval struck Heidfeld's rear, and Duval's rear was then hit by teammate Fässler. The No. 3 Audi missed the rest of the session due to major front and rear-end repairs, but all other drivers returned to the pit lane. Maxime Jousse crashed the front left of the No. 28 Gulf Lola at high speed into the outside turn 11 tire barrier, stopping practice for 14 minutes. He was uninjured. Steven Kane stopped the No. 16 Dyson Lola in turn one with a loss of power and halted practice for five minutes. All three incidents extended the session by 20 minutes.

On March 16, the final morning practice session lasted one hour. Audi kept their No. 1 and 3 cars out of the session after finishing their pre-qualifying preparations, as Dumas went fastest overall with a lap time of 1:48.200. Moreau, Belicchi and Lucas Luhr's No. 6 Muscle Milk car occupied second to fourth, respectively. Pla set the LMP2 pace with a time of 1:51.318, a half-second faster than Sarrazin and John Martin. On his final lap before practice ended, Richard Lietz in the No. 77 Felbermayr-Proton Porsche set the first sub-two-minute GT lap at 1:59.987. Ferraris were second and third in class with Melo (No. 59 Luxury) ahead of Vilander (No. 51 AF Corse). Jönsson's lap of 2:01.348 was fastest in LMGTE Am from Ruberti and Lamy. E. J. Viso's No. 06 CORE entry led in PC after lapping at 1:55.606, ahead of Bruno Junqueira's No. 9 RSR car. Keen paced GTC from Faulkner with a lap of 2:06.365. Kévin Estre's No. 11 JDX car spun and crashed into the turn ten tire barrier, prompting an early end to the session with two minutes to go.

== Qualifying ==
A 65-minute qualifying session divided into four 15-minute sessions was held in the afternoon of March 16. The rules required each team to nominate one qualifying driver, with the quickest laps determining each class' starting order. IMSA and the FIA awarded a championship point to the pole-sitting team and their drivers in each category. Audi led from the start once more, with Lotterer taking Audi's tenth Sebring pole with a lap of 1:45.820 recorded during the closing minutes of qualifying despite serving a penalty for speeding in the pit lane. The time was nearly four-tenths of a second faster than Kristensen's fastest lap in second. Dumas qualified the rebuilt No. 3 Audi third, completing a top three sweep for the manufacturer. Graf's No. 6 Muscle Milk HPD car was the top ALMS qualifier in fourth and Moreau's No. 15 OAK Pescarolo car was the highest-placed WEC petrol-powered entry in fifth. OAK earned the LMP2 pole position with a time of 1:50.467 set by Pla after duelling the second-placed Sarrazin and Greaves Motorsport's third-placed Elton Julian. Bouchut's No. 055 Level 5 car was the fastest ALMS LMP2 entry. He swerved to avoid a car emerging ahead of him from the pit lane exit and collided with both the inside and outside barriers at turn one. He was uninjured; the session was stopped for seven minutes.

Junqueira's lap of 1:54.510 won RSR their first ALMS PC pole position in their class debut. Viso's No. 06 CORE car and Dane Cameron's Dempsey entry were second and third in class. Bruni's lap time of 1:58.427 with a minute to go secured him a second consecutive GT pole at Sebring and broke the 2011 category track lap record by more than two seconds. Bruni avoided striking the barrier in a lateral slide leaving turn 17 by engaging first gear and turning the car around. Second in GT was Melo's No. 59 Luxury Ferrari and Jan Magnussen's No. 03 Corvette was the highest-placed ALMS GT entry in third place. Farnbacher reset the LMGTE Am lap record with a time of 2:00.184, putting the No. 58 Luxury Ferrari on pole. Jönsson qualified the Krohn Ferrari second and Lamy's No. 50 Larbre Corvette was third in class. Edwards' No. 30 NGT car secured pole in the GTC category with a 2:06.674 lap time, earning him his third career ALMS pole. Edwards' lap time was 0.023 seconds faster than Faulkner's Green Hornet vehicle's best effort. Keen took third in class with the No. 22 AJR entry.

=== Post-qualifying ===
Francesco Dracone became unwell and was replaced as a driver of the Conquest LMP2 car by Jan Heylen, who was granted a waiver despite not participating in night practice. This driver change demoted the entry to the back of the grid. Gulf No. 29 Lola was excluded from the race for failing to meet the minimum qualifying time due to engine installation issues that limited it to two qualifying laps, dropping the number of race starters to 63. OAK's No. 15 car was moved to the rear of the field for failing a post-qualifying stall test.

=== Qualifying result ===
Pole position winners in each class are marked in bold.

Final qualifying result
| Pos | Class | Team | Driver | Lap time | Grid |
|---|---|---|---|---|---|
| 1 | **LMP1** | **#1 Audi Sport Team Joest** | **André Lotterer** | **1:45.820** | **1** |
| 2 | LMP1 | #2 Audi Sport Team Joest | Tom Kristensen | 1:46.215 | 2 |
| 3 | LMP1 | #3 Audi Sport Team Joest | Romain Dumas | 1:46.935 | 3 |
| 4 | **P1** | **#6 Muscle Milk Pickett Racing** | **Klaus Graf** | **1:47.536** | **4** |
| 5 | LMP1 | #15 OAK Racing | Guillaume Moreau | 1:48.319 | 62 |
| 6 | LMP1 | #22 JRM | David Brabham | 1:48.439 | 5 |
| 7 | LMP1 | #21 Strakka Racing | Danny Watts | 1:48.590 | 6 |
| 8 | LMP1 | #12 Rebellion Racing | Neel Jani | 1:48.630 | 7 |
| 9 | LMP1 | #13 Rebellion Racing | Andrea Belicchi | 1:48.956 | 8 |
| 10 | LMP1 | #16 Pescarolo Team | Emmanuel Collard | 1:50.200 | 9 |
| 11 | **LMP2** | **#24 OAK Racing** | **Olivier Pla** | **1:50.467** | **10** |
| 12 | LMP2 | #44 Starworks Motorsport | Stéphane Sarrazin | 1:50.823 | 11 |
| 13 | LMP2 | #41 Greaves Motorsport | Elton Julian | 1:51.809 | 12 |
| 14 | LMP2 | #23 Signatech Nissan | Franck Mailleux | 1:52.084 | 13 |
| 15 | LMP2 | #25 ADR-Delta | John Martin | 1:52.113 | 14 |
| 16 | **P2** | **#055 Level 5 Motorsports** | **Christophe Bouchut** | **1:52.129** | **15** |
| 17 | P2 | #37 Conquest Endurance | Martin Plowman | 1:52.493 | 63 |
| 18 | P2 | #95 Level 5 Motorsports | Luis Díaz | 1:52.659 | 16 |
| 19 | LMP2 | #49 PeCom Racing | Pierre Kaffer | 1:52.763 | 17 |
| 20 | LMP2 | #31 Lotus | Thomas Holzer | 1:53.080 | 18 |
| 21 | **PC** | **#9 RSR Racing** | **Bruno Junqueira** | **1:54.510** | **19** |
| 22 | PC | #06 CORE Autosport | E. J. Viso | 1:54.555 | 20 |
| 23 | P1 | #016 Dyson Racing | Chris Dyson | 1:54.593 | 21 |
| 24 | PC | #025 Dempsey Racing | Dane Cameron | 1:54.628 | 22 |
| 25 | PC | #7 Merchant Services Racing | Pablo Sanchez | 1:55.160 | 23 |
| 26 | PC | #05 CORE Autosport | Colin Braun | 1:55.208 | 24 |
| 27 | PC | #5 Muscle Milk Pickett Racing | Memo Gidley | 1:55.420 | 25 |
| 28 | PC | #52 PR1 Mathiasen Racing | Butch Leitzinger | 1:55.460 | 26 |
| 29 | PC | #8 Merchant Services Racing | Kyle Marcelli | 1:55.654 | 27 |
| 30 | PC | #18 Performance Tech Motorsports | Raphael Matos | 1:55.848 | 28 |
| 31 | **LMGTE Pro** | **#51 AF Corse** | **Gianmaria Bruni** | **1:58.427** | **29** |
| 32 | LMGTE Pro | #59 Luxury Racing | Jaime Melo | 1:58.723 | 30 |
| 33 | **GT** | **#03 Corvette Racing** | **Jan Magnussen** | **1:58.996** | **31** |
| 34 | GT | #4 Corvette Racing | Oliver Gavin | 1;59.007 | 32 |
| 35 | LMGTE Pro | #71 AF Corse | Olivier Beretta | 1:59.084 | 33 |
| 36 | GT | #56 BMW Team RLL | Joey Hand | 1:59.776 | 34 |
| 37 | GT | #01 Extreme Speed Motorsports | Johannes van Overbeek | 2:00.094 | 35 |
| 38 | GT | #45 Flying Lizard Motorsports | Jörg Bergmeister | 2:00.119 | 36 |
| 39 | LMGTE Pro | #97 Aston Martin Racing | Stefan Mücke | 2:00.174 | 37 |
| 40 | **LMGTE Am** | **#58 Luxury Racing** | **Dominik Farnbacher** | **2:00.184** | **38** |
| 41 | LMGTE Pro | #77 Team Felbermayr-Proton | Richard Lietz | 2:00.256 | 39 |
| 42 | GT | #155 BMW Team RLL | Jörg Müller | 2:00.337 | 40 |
| 43 | GT | #02 Extreme Speed Motorsports | Anthony Lazzaro | 2:00.344 | 41 |
| 44 | LMGTE Am | #57 Krohn Racing | Niclas Jönsson | 2:00.929 | 42 |
| 45 | GT | #17 Team Falken Tire | Wolf Henzler | 2:01.632 | 43 |
| 46 | LMGTE Am | #50 Larbre Compétition | Pedro Lamy | 2:01.640 | 44 |
| 47 | LMGTE Am | #88 Team Felbermayr-Proton | Paolo Ruberti | 2:01.787 | 45 |
| 48 | GT | #48 Paul Miller Racing | Sascha Maassen | 2:02.150 | 46 |
| 49 | LMGTE Am | #70 Larbre Compétition | Jean-Philippe Belloc | 2:02.732 | 47 |
| 50 | LMGTE Am | #61 AF Corse-Waltrip | Rui Águas | 2:03.331 | 48 |
| 51 | LMGTE Am | #55 JWA-Avila | Joël Camathias | 2:04.342 | 49 |
| 52 | **GTC** | **#30 NGT Motorsport** | **Sean Edwards** | **2:06.674** | **50** |
| 53 | GTC | #34 Green Hornet Racing | Damien Faulkner | 2:06.697 | 51 |
| 54 | GTC | #022 Alex Job Racing | Leh Keen | 2:06.711 | 52 |
| 55 | GTC | #023 Alex Job Racing | Dion von Moltke | 2:07.016 | 53 |
| 56 | GTC | #11 JDX Racing | Kévin Estre | 2:07.264 | 54 |
| 57 | GT | #044 Flying Lizard Motorsports | Seth Neiman | 2:07.354 | 55 |
| 58 | GTC | #031 NGT Motorsport | Nicki Thiim | 2:07.434 | 56 |
| 59 | GTC | #66 TRG | Spencer Pumpelly | 2:07.550 | 57 |
| 60 | GTC | #32 GMG Racing | James Sofronas | 2:08.607 | 58 |
| 61 | GTC | #024 Competition Motorsports | Cort Wagner | 2:08.792 | 59 |
| 62 | P2 | #54 Black Swan Racing | Jon Fogarty | 2:35.156 | 60 |
| 63 | LMP2 | #29 Gulf Racing Middle East | Jean-Denis Delétraz | 14:43.720 | EX (Note: The No. 29 Gulf Racing Middle East car was excluded for not meeting the minimum required time during practice and qualifying.) |
| 64 | LMP2 | #28 Gulf Racing Middle East | No Time | | 61 |

== Warm-up ==
A 25-minute morning warm-up session for drivers to examine their cars before the race began on March 17 under sunny but foggy conditions. McNish was fastest with a lap time of 1:50.804. Starworks' Dalziel was fastest in LMP2, Richard Westbrook's No. 4 Corvette led in GT, Rui Águas' AF Corse-Waltrip Ferrari topped LMGTE Am, Matos of Performance Tech paced PC and TRG's Pumpelly led GTC. The session was interrupted when John Martin crashed the ADR-Delta Oreca car into the turn one inside barrier. Bryan Sellers' Falken car suffered an engine failure with smoke billowing from its left-rear; the team began changing the engine to allow it to take the race start.

== Race ==
=== Start and early hours ===
The race, which started at 10:30 a.m. local time, drew more than 90,000 spectators. FIA president Jean Todt commanded the drivers to start their engines. Competitors were focused on heavy traffic, and traffic management was a factor. Following the withdrawal of the No. 29 Gulf Lola, 63 cars were scheduled to start, but the No. 17 Falken Porsche (engine change), No. 22 JRM HPD entry (steering wheel change after a safety car switch problem on another one), and No. 28 Gulf Lola were all in the pit lane. During the second (and final) formation lap, Jörg Bergmeister's No. 45 Flying Lizard Porsche and Farnbacher's No. 58 Luxury Ferrari collided entering turn 17. Farnbacher entered the pit lane with frontal damage, while Bergmeister was towed in with his left-rear suspension wheel bent and undertray damage that took 26 laps to repair in the garage. The Luxury Ferrari did not complete a single lap, and was retired following an inspection and repairs. The Flying Lizard Porsche returned to the track after spending most of the first hour replaced the damaged suspension. Because it was deemed a "racing incident," no action was taken, and Farnbacher apologized to Flying Lizard in the paddock for the crash.

McNish passed Lotterer in the fast turn 17 for the lead at the end of the first lap. Vilander brought the GT leading No. 51 AF Corse Ferrari into the garage for 45 minutes with an alternator failure on lap five; the car rejoined the race 20 laps down. This gave Melo's No. 59 Luxury Ferrari the GT lead. The first full course caution was necessitated for 15 minutes for an incident on lap eight. Alternator problems forced Águas to stop the AF Corse-Waltrip Ferrari at the side of the course before restarting and stopping again. McNish lost the overall lead to teammate Fässler during the pit stop cycle for fuel and tires, as his crew was eager to be out of sequence to avoid pit lane traffic. When racing restarted, the No. 44 Starworks and No. 24 OAK Racing teams battled for the LMP2 lead. Olivier Beretta moved the No. 71 AF Corse Ferrari past Gavin's No. 04 Corvette on the inside to take second place in GT. McNish lapped quicker than any other driver and returned the No. 2 Audi to the overall lead when the other two Audis and Graf's No. 6 Muscle Milk entry made pit stops.

=== Afternoon ===
Fässler collided with a Luxury Ferrari in the middle of the second hour and lost control of the No. 1 Audi, but he continued without losing much time. After going off the circuit at turn 10, Keen's No. 22 AJR car suffered a left-rear puncture and wheel damage, handing the GTC class lead to Estre's No. 11 JDX entry. The second full course caution was issued when Hansson's LMP2 Conquest Morgan entry stopped at the hairpin braking point with no fuel and was towed to the pit lane. After 23 minutes of caution, racing resumed before a four-car crash involving the No. 01 ESM Ferrari, No. 5 Muscle Milk PC entry, No. 28 Gulf Lola, and the Luxury Ferrari did not necessitate any intervention because all four cars were able to return to the pit lane. A third full course caution was required for track cleanup when Olivier Lombard's No. 23 Signatech Oreca, Melo's GT-category leading Luxury Ferrari, Hunter-Reay's No. 95 Level 5 car, and the No. 22 AJR Porsche collided on fluids at turn 13. The Signatech Oreca and Luxury Ferrari were both retired due to car damage.

When racing resumed, Dalziel's Starworks HPD car took up the LMP2 class lead, while Edwards' No. 30 NGT car reclaimed the GTC lead. Jordan Taylor's No. 03 Corvette gained on the GT-leading No. 77 Felbermayr-Proton Porsche of Patrick Pilet and passed him just before the fourth hour ended. Benoît Tréluyer slowed on the Ullmann Straight due to an electronic downshift gear selection issue that was traced to the electric motor driving the gearbox's selection mechanism. He briefly brought the No. 1 Audi into the garage to rectify the fault by changing some car components early in the fifth hour. Felbermayr-Proton's No. 88 Porsche spun behind the No. 55 JWA-Avila Porsche at turn four, prompting Tracy Krohn's LMGTE Am leading Krohn Ferrari to spin in avoidance. This moved Patrick Bornhauser's No. 50 Larbre Corvette into the LMGTE Am lead. Duncan Ende lost control of the Dempsey PC car and lightly collided with the turn four tire barrier, causing the fourth full course caution. Some teams made pit stops for fuel during the caution. After racing resumed, Dominik Kraihamer in fifth overall lost control of the No. 15 OAK Pescarolo at the exit of a turn, damaging the car's rear-left gently against the barrier but continuing to drive. In LMP2, Pecom's Ayari led, but he was two seconds slower on one lap, and he was passed by Bouchut and Sarrazin.

Markus Palttala ceded the No. 55 JWA Porsche's GTC lead to Cisneros' No. 30 NGT car when Palttala served a penalty for overtaking the safety car under caution. The GT lead became a multi-car battle between Beretta and Andrea Bertolini's No. 71 AF Corse Ferrari, the Nos. 04 (Gavin and Tommy Milner) and 03 Corvettes (Magnussen and Antonio García), Liet and Marc Lieb's No. 77 Felbermayr-Proton Porsche with all cars running close behind each other and overtakes occurring between them. Fässler's No. 1 Audi slowed on course until it was brought into the garage for several laps due to a recurrence of its gear selection issue. This moved the No. 6 Muscle Milk HPD car to third overall. RSR's PC leading car entered the pit lane and lost the class lead to the No. 06 CORE entry. Heylen's No. 37 Conquest Morgan entry necessitated the fifth full course caution after it stopped past the bridge at the first corner with a lack of drive and required recovery to the pit lane. After 15 minutes of caution, Roger Wills' No. 5 Muscle Milk PC car crashed backwards into the turn seven tire barrier and returned to the pit lane with bodywork and car damage, necessitating a sixth full course caution for barrier repairs.

Auberlen's No. 155 RLL BMW took the GT lead from Milner's No. 04 Corvette when racing resumed in the eighth hour. Darren Turner's No. 97 Aston Martin triggered the eighth full course caution when his left-rear wheel disconnected from the car entering the hairpin and went down the main straight. Turner's car stopped on the side of the track and required a 25-minute recovery to the pit lane to replace a new wheel. Soon after racing resumed, Henri Richard's Dempsey PC car spun in front of Performance Tech's Anthony Nicolosi, who collided with him in the turn 10 braking zone. Richard struck the concrete barrier just before the backstraightaway with the car's front and underside, necessitating its retirement and the eighth full course caution for debris cleanup by track marshals. He was uninjured. Krohn's Ferrari appeared to get caught out by a slowing car ahead of him in the concertina effect and collided with the outside wall at the start of the Ullman straight, extending the safety car period to allow turn workers to repair the barrier. The Krohn Ferrari entered the garage for 71 minutes to replace the rear suspension and splitter.

=== Sunset to finish ===
When racing restarted as the sun fell, Cisneros' No. 30 NGT vehicle lost the GTC lead to Townsend Bell's No. 023 AJR car. Cisneros later collided into the turn 13 tire barrier head on, forcing the No. 30 NGT team to withdraw as well as the ninth full course caution for 20 minutes to rebuild the six-deep tire wall. He was uninjured. The engine in Moreau's No. 15 OAK Pescarolo failed, sending smoke rising from the engine cover, prompting the tenth full course caution soon after. Moreau's car stopped at turn seven on the track and had to be extricated to the pit lane. When racing resumed, Luhr's No. 6 Muscle Milk car and JRM's Peter Dumbreck battled for third overall until Dumbreck's rear-right tire punctured. The ensuing collapse of the right-rear suspension, which came after a pit stop to replace the ruptured tire, cost the No. 22 car 15 laps in the garage.

The race's 11th and final full course caution (a new Sebring record) came when Nicolosi stopped in the opposite direction in the grass and the stranded Performance Tech entry was recovered to the pit lane. Nicki Thiim's No. 031 NGT Porsche collided with Dion von Moltke's No. 023 AJR vehicle at the bumpy turn 17 after the safety car was recalled, and both cars spun. Both drivers were able to continue, although Thiim ceded NGT's hold on second in GTC to Faulkner's Green Hornet car as he entered the pit lane for repairs. The first six cars in GT were on the same lap, with Milner's No. 4 Corvette, Hand's No. 56 RLL BMW, and Beretta's No. 71 AF Corse Ferrari sharing the class lead. When Faulkner spun at the entry to turn 17, his team's hold on second in GTC was lost. Nicolas Prost's No. 12 Rebellion Lola was forced to drive on the starter motor after the exit of turn 16 in a safe place on the Ullman straight due to an electronic glitch. The car was recovered to the pit lane and the problem was fixed.

In the final hour, Simon Pagenaud experienced a refueling valve failure due to a loose buckeye during a pit stop, and a failed swap to another valve resulted in a fuel leak, forcing the No. 6 Muscle Milk car to retire. Sarrazin's Starworks LMP2 HPD car advanced to third overall after he and Barbosa raced nose-to-tail for the final two hours, exchanging the LMP2 lead several times. Sarrazin passed Barbosa after the final round of pit stops and began to draw away as Barbosa was slower on the soft compound tires. Bernhard's No. 3 Audi was a lap behind the sister No. 2 car when he collided with a GTC-class Porsche, necessitating a pit lane rear end change. Lamy's No. 50 Larbre Corvette lost the LMGTE Am lead when its driveshaft failed and the car stopped on track with 16 minutes remaining, advancing Ruberti's No. 88 Felbermayr-Proton Porsche to first place, which he held to the finish. Pit stops changed the GT order, making it a duel between BMW and Ferrari. Beretta's 71 AF Corse Ferrari and Hand's 56 RLL BMW traded the class lead in the preceding laps until Bruni's sister No. 51 Ferrari bumped Hand in an attempt to unlap himself at turn three on the final lap and spun him off the track. Beretta suffered a puncture after spinning in avoidance of the incident. Hand regained control of his car and overtook Beretta, believing the latter had hit him.

Unhindered since the second half of the event, the No. 1 Audi completed 325 laps, leading all but 66 laps to secure McNish's fourth Sebring victory, Capello's fifth, Kristensen's sixth, and Audi's tenth, four laps ahead of Bernhard's No. 3 car in the R18 TDI's final race. The No. 16 Pescarolo in sixth overall was untroubled and completed the LMP1 class podium. Dyson Racing won ALMS P1 as the category's sole classified finisher, finishing eighth overall. Starworks' HPD LMP2 car won the class and finished third overall, with a 32-second lead over the highest-placed ALMS P2 entry, Level 5's No. 055 car, in their third Sebring category win when most LMP1 privateer entrants had trouble. CORE's No. 6 Oreca FLM09 car took their first PC Sebring win by one lap over the PR1 car. Hand recovered to claim RLL's second consecutive Sebring GT victory by 1.740 seconds over Magnussen's No. 03 Corvette. Beretta's No. 71 AF Corse Ferrari fell behind Magnussen by slowing following his final lap spin but won in WEC LMGTE Pro and was third overall in GT. Felbermayr-Proton won the WEC's LMGTE Am class by one lap over the No. 70 Larbre Corvette. AJR took their eighth Sebring class win and second in succession in GTC with the No. 023 car a lap ahead of the sister No. 022 entry.

== Post-race ==
The top three finishes in each of the nine classes appeared on the podium separately before being interviewed. Capello said the win was not easy and added that slower cars were a major issue, "We were careful, we finished with just little scratches on our car, nothing serious. It was one of the keys to our success today." McNish added, "We didn't necessarily have the best of seasons in 2011. The thing we're looking towards now is the next race in the world championship. From my point of view, we've had a really good run and we should really be proud of that." Kristensen said the speed difference was now a challenge and that it "was amazing to come here and celebrate the team effort." Bernhard argued that his car had slightly more performance but conceded "it didn't work out for us today." Sarrazin called the duel with Level 5 "a great race all the way through" and that Starworks became gradually faster in the concluding two hours. Dalziel praised his team's work in the preceding weeks and co-driver Enzo Potolicchio added that third was "the first step for us, being 3rd overall in a P2 car was amazing."

Beretta spoke on his last lap accident: "The BMW went sideways. I jumped on the brakes and lost it." He added that he felt Hand caused the crash but said that "He wants to win, and we want to win and that was just racing." Hand argued that Bruni had no opportunity to unlap himself and had expected the collision. Nevertheless, Hand said he enjoyed driving for RLL and was motivated by both team owner Bobby Rahal and his co-drivers, adding, "Did you see how many times we came in second and left in first? I hope everybody got a show. If you didn't like that, you don't like racing." Bruni was fined $15,000 by the race officials for the final lap accident, and the No. 51 AF Corse Ferrari was disqualified for "unsportsmanlike conduct". Ruberti called his LMGTE Am win "like a dream" and said he completed the final stint in the last hour with no power steering. Von Moltke explained that following his accident with Thiim, he had to push hard during the closing two hours in which he built up a gap to enable AJR to win in GTC.

ALMS president and CEO Scott Atherton said that the race exceeded his expectations and that "it had all the makings of a real challenging and potentially fraught-with-danger experience. Still, this was a textbook example of cooperation, compromise and mutual respect that started at the top and permeated every aspect of the event." Racer's Tony DiZinno wrote in an opinion column that spectators ideally wanted to witness a simpler and understandable sports car race with no confusion over each car category in which racing series, adding: "the obvious point is that next year's Sebring needs to be a cleaner and simpler event. The race, the ALMS and the fans all deserve better. Grand as the 2012 race may have been, the confusion and politics that affected it should be, like the race, consigned to history." The WEC did not return to Sebring until the 2019 1000 Miles of Sebring as the series' American event was established at the Circuit of the Americas.

=== Race result ===
Class winners in bold. Cars failing to complete 70% of winner's distance (227 laps) marked as not classified (NC). (Note: No combined final race classification has been published as of 2023.)

Final race classification
| Pos | Class | No | Team | Drivers | Chassis | Tire | Laps | Time/Retired |
| Pos | Class | No | Team | Drivers | Engine | Tire | Laps | Time/Retired |
|---|---|---|---|---|---|---|---|---|
| 1 | **LMP1** | **2** | **(Germany) Audi Sport Team Joest** | **(United Kingdom) Allan McNish (Denmark) Tom Kristensen (Italy) Rinaldo Capello** | **Audi R18 TDI** | M | **325** | **12:00:12.191 (Note: The FIA WEC final classification states the final winning time is 12:00'15.243.)** |
| 1 | **LMP1** | **2** | **(Germany) Audi Sport Team Joest** | **(United Kingdom) Allan McNish (Denmark) Tom Kristensen (Italy) Rinaldo Capello** | **Audi TDI 3.7 L Turbo V6 (Diesel)** | M | **325** | **12:00:12.191** |
| 2 | LMP1 | 3 | (Germany) Audi Sport Team Joest | (Germany) Timo Bernhard (France) Romain Dumas (France) Loïc Duval | Audi R18 TDI | M | 321 | +4 Laps |
| 2 | LMP1 | 3 | (Germany) Audi Sport Team Joest | (Germany) Timo Bernhard (France) Romain Dumas (France) Loïc Duval | Audi TDI 3.7 L Turbo V6 (Diesel) | M | 321 | +4 Laps |
| 3 | **LMP2** | **44** | **(United States) Starworks Motorsport** | **(United Kingdom) Ryan Dalziel (Venezuela) Enzo Potolicchio (France) Stéphane Sarrazin** | **HPD ARX-03b** | D | **319** | **+6 Laps** |
| 3 | **LMP2** | **44** | **(United States) Starworks Motorsport** | **(United Kingdom) Ryan Dalziel (Venezuela) Enzo Potolicchio (France) Stéphane Sarrazin** | **Honda HR28TT 2.8 L Turbo V6** | D | **319** | **+6 Laps** |
| 4 | **P2** | **055** | **(United States) Level 5 Motorsports** | **(United States) Scott Tucker (Portugal) João Barbosa (France) Christophe Bouchut** | **HPD ARX-03b** | D | **319** | **+6 Laps** |
| 4 | **P2** | **055** | **(United States) Level 5 Motorsports** | **(United States) Scott Tucker (Portugal) João Barbosa (France) Christophe Bouchut** | **Honda HR28TT 2.8 L Turbo V6** | D | **319** | **+6 Laps** |
| 5 | LMP2 | 24 | (France) OAK Racing | (France) Jacques Nicolet (France) Olivier Pla (France) Matthieu Lahaye | Morgan LMP2 | D | 318 | +7 Laps |
| 5 | LMP2 | 24 | (France) OAK Racing | (France) Jacques Nicolet (France) Olivier Pla (France) Matthieu Lahaye | Judd HK 3.6 L V8 | D | 318 | +7 Laps |
| 6 | LMP1 | 16 | (France) Pescarolo Team | (France) Emmanuel Collard (France) Jean-Christophe Boullion (France) Julien Jousse | Pescarolo 01 | M | 318 | +7 Laps |
| 6 | LMP1 | 16 | (France) Pescarolo Team | (France) Emmanuel Collard (France) Jean-Christophe Boullion (France) Julien Jousse | Judd GV5 S2 5.0 L V10 | M | 318 | +7 Laps |
| 7 | LMP2 | 49 | (Argentina) Pecom Racing | (Argentina) Luis Pérez Companc (France) Soheil Ayari (Germany) Pierre Kaffer | Oreca 03 | D | 317 | +8 Laps |
| 7 | LMP2 | 49 | (Argentina) Pecom Racing | (Argentina) Luis Pérez Companc (France) Soheil Ayari (Germany) Pierre Kaffer | Nissan VK45DE 4.5 L V8 | D | 317 | +8 Laps |
| 8 | **P1** | **016** | **(United States) Dyson Racing Team** | **(United States) Chris Dyson (United Kingdom) Guy Smith (United Kingdom) Steven Kane** | **Lola B12/60** | D | **317** | **+8 Laps** |
| 8 | **P1** | **016** | **(United States) Dyson Racing Team** | **(United States) Chris Dyson (United Kingdom) Guy Smith (United Kingdom) Steven Kane** | **Mazda MZR-R 2.0 L Turbo I4 (Butanol)** | D | **317** | **+8 Laps** |
| 9 | LMP2 | 41 | (United Kingdom) Greaves Motorsport | (Germany) Christian Zugel (Mexico) Ricardo González (Ecuador) Elton Julian | Zytek Z11SN | D | 316 | +9 Laps |
| 9 | LMP2 | 41 | (United Kingdom) Greaves Motorsport | (Germany) Christian Zugel (Mexico) Ricardo González (Ecuador) Elton Julian | Nissan VK45DE 4.5 L V8 | D | 316 | +9 Laps |
| 10 | LMP1 | 21 | (United Kingdom) Strakka Racing | (United Kingdom) Nick Leventis (United Kingdom) Jonny Kane (United Kingdom) Danny Watts | HPD ARX-03a | M | 316 | +9 Laps |
| 10 | LMP1 | 21 | (United Kingdom) Strakka Racing | (United Kingdom) Nick Leventis (United Kingdom) Jonny Kane (United Kingdom) Danny Watts | Honda LM-V8 3.4 L V8 | M | 316 | +9 Laps |
| 11 | LMP2 | 25 | (United Kingdom) ADR-Delta | (Australia) John Martin (United Kingdom) Robbie Kerr (Thailand) Tor Graves | Oreca 03 | D | 315 | +10 Laps |
| 11 | LMP2 | 25 | (United Kingdom) ADR-Delta | (Australia) John Martin (United Kingdom) Robbie Kerr (Thailand) Tor Graves | Nissan VK45DE 4.5 L V8 | D | 315 | +10 Laps |
| 12 | **PC** | **06** | **(United States) CORE Autosport** | **(Venezuela) E. J. Viso (Venezuela) Alex Popow (United States) Burt Frisselle** | **Oreca FLM09** | M | **312** | **+13 Laps** |
| 12 | **PC** | **06** | **(United States) CORE Autosport** | **(Venezuela) E. J. Viso (Venezuela) Alex Popow (United States) Burt Frisselle** | **Chevrolet LS3 6.2 L V8** | M | **312** | **+13 Laps** |
| 13 | PC | 52 | (United States) PR1 Mathiasen Racing | (United States) Butch Leitzinger (United States) Ken Dobson (Mexico) Rudy Junco Jr. | Oreca FLM09 | M | 311 | +14 Laps |
| 13 | PC | 52 | (United States) PR1 Mathiasen Racing | (United States) Butch Leitzinger (United States) Ken Dobson (Mexico) Rudy Junco Jr. | Chevrolet LS3 6.2 L V8 | M | 311 | +14 Laps |
| 14 DNF | LMP2 | 31 | (Germany) Lotus | (Germany) Thomas Holzer (Germany) Mirco Schultis (Italy) Luco Moro | Lola B12/80 | D | 310 | Did not finish |
| 14 DNF | LMP2 | 31 | (Germany) Lotus | (Germany) Thomas Holzer (Germany) Mirco Schultis (Italy) Luco Moro | Lotus (Judd) 3.6 L V8 | D | 310 | Did not finish |
| 15 | PC | 05 | (United States) CORE Autosport | (United States) Colin Braun (United States) Jon Bennett (United States) Eric Lux | Oreca FLM09 | M | 310 | +15 Laps |
| 15 | PC | 05 | (United States) CORE Autosport | (United States) Colin Braun (United States) Jon Bennett (United States) Eric Lux | Chevrolet LS3 6.2 L V8 | M | 310 | +15 Laps |
| 16 | LMP1 | 1 | (Germany) Audi Sport Team Joest | (Germany) André Lotterer (France) Benoît Tréluyer (Switzerland) Marcel Fässler | Audi R18 TDI | M | 310 | +15 Laps |
| 16 | LMP1 | 1 | (Germany) Audi Sport Team Joest | (Germany) André Lotterer (France) Benoît Tréluyer (Switzerland) Marcel Fässler | Audi TDI 3.7 L Turbo V6 (Diesel) | M | 310 | +15 Laps |
| 17 | LMP1 | 22 | (United Kingdom) JRM | (United Kingdom) Peter Dumbreck (Australia) David Brabham (India) Karun Chandhok | HPD ARX-03a | M | 309 | +16 Laps |
| 17 | LMP1 | 22 | (United Kingdom) JRM | (United Kingdom) Peter Dumbreck (Australia) David Brabham (India) Karun Chandhok | Honda LM-V8 3.4 L V8 | M | 309 | +16 Laps |
| 18 | **GT** | **56** | **(United States) BMW Team RLL** | **(Germany) Dirk Müller (United States) Joey Hand (United States) Jonathan Summerton** | **BMW M3 GT2** | D | **307** | **+18 Laps** |
| 18 | **GT** | **56** | **(United States) BMW Team RLL** | **(Germany) Dirk Müller (United States) Joey Hand (United States) Jonathan Summerton** | **BMW S65B40 4.0 L V8** | D | **307** | **+18 Laps** |
| 19 | GT | 03 | (United States) Corvette Racing | (Denmark) Jan Magnussen (United States) Jordan Taylor (Spain) Antonio García | Chevrolet Corvette C6.R | M | 307 | +18 Laps |
| 19 | GT | 03 | (United States) Corvette Racing | (Denmark) Jan Magnussen (United States) Jordan Taylor (Spain) Antonio García | Chevrolet LS5.5R 5.5 L V8 | M | 307 | +18 Laps |
| 20 | **LMGTE; Pro** | **71** | **(Italy) AF Corse** | **(Italy) Andrea Bertolini (Monaco) Olivier Beretta (Italy) Marco Cioci** | **Ferrari 458 Italia GT2** | M | **307** | **+18 Laps** |
| 20 | **LMGTE; Pro** | **71** | **(Italy) AF Corse** | **(Italy) Andrea Bertolini (Monaco) Olivier Beretta (Italy) Marco Cioci** | **Ferrari F136 4.5 L V8** | M | **307** | **+18 Laps** |
| 21 | GT | 4 | (United States) Corvette Racing | (United Kingdom) Oliver Gavin (United States) Tommy Milner (United Kingdom) Richard Westbrook | Chevrolet Corvette C6.R | M | 307 | +18 Laps |
| 21 | GT | 4 | (United States) Corvette Racing | (United Kingdom) Oliver Gavin (United States) Tommy Milner (United Kingdom) Richard Westbrook | Chevrolet LS5.5R 5.5 L V8 | M | 307 | +18 Laps |
| 22 | GT | 155 | (United States) BMW Team RLL | (United States) Bill Auberlen (Germany) Jörg Müller (Germany) Uwe Alzen | BMW M3 GT2 | D | 307 | +18 Laps |
| 22 | GT | 155 | (United States) BMW Team RLL | (United States) Bill Auberlen (Germany) Jörg Müller (Germany) Uwe Alzen | BMW S65B40 4.0 L V8 | D | 307 | +18 Laps |
| 23 | LMGTE; Pro | 77 | (Germany) Team Felbermayr-Proton | (Germany) Marc Lieb (Austria) Richard Lietz (France) Patrick Pilet | Porsche 997 GT3-RSR | M | 306 | +19 Laps |
| 23 | LMGTE; Pro | 77 | (Germany) Team Felbermayr-Proton | (Germany) Marc Lieb (Austria) Richard Lietz (France) Patrick Pilet | Porsche M97/74 4.0 L Flat-6 | M | 306 | +19 Laps |
| 24 | GT | 48 | (United States) Paul Miller Racing | (United States) Bryce Miller (Germany) Sascha Maassen (United Kingdom) Rob Bell | Porsche 997 GT3-RSR | D | 303 | +22 Laps |
| 24 | GT | 48 | (United States) Paul Miller Racing | (United States) Bryce Miller (Germany) Sascha Maassen (United Kingdom) Rob Bell | Porsche M97/74 4.0 L Flat-6 | D | 303 | +22 Laps |
| 25 | PC | 7 | (United States) Merchant Services Racing | (United States) Chapman Ducote (Mexico) Javier Acheverria (Mexico) Pablo Sanchez | Oreca FLM09 | M | 303 | +22 Laps |
| 25 | PC | 7 | (United States) Merchant Services Racing | (United States) Chapman Ducote (Mexico) Javier Acheverria (Mexico) Pablo Sanchez | Chevrolet LS3 6.2 L V8 | M | 303 | +22 Laps |
| 26 | GT | 044 | (United States) Flying Lizard Motorsports | (United States) Seth Neiman (United States) Darren Law (United States) Andy Lally | Porsche 997 GT3-RSR | M | 303 | +22 Laps |
| 26 | GT | 044 | (United States) Flying Lizard Motorsports | (United States) Seth Neiman (United States) Darren Law (United States) Andy Lally | Porsche M97/74 4.0 L Flat-6 | M | 303 | +22 Laps |
| 27 | GT | 02 | (United States) Extreme Speed Motorsports | (United States) Ed Brown (United States) Jeff Segal (United States) Anthony Lazzaro | Ferrari 458 Italia GT2 | M | 303 | +22 Laps |
| 27 | GT | 02 | (United States) Extreme Speed Motorsports | (United States) Ed Brown (United States) Jeff Segal (United States) Anthony Lazzaro | Ferrari F136 4.5 L V8 | M | 303 | +22 Laps |
| 28 DNF | P1 | 6 | (United States) Muscle Milk Pickett Racing | (Germany) Klaus Graf (Germany) Lucas Luhr (France) Simon Pagenaud | HPD ARX-03a | M | 302 | Fuel valve |
| 28 DNF | P1 | 6 | (United States) Muscle Milk Pickett Racing | (Germany) Klaus Graf (Germany) Lucas Luhr (France) Simon Pagenaud | Honda LM-V8 3.4 L V8 | M | 302 | Fuel valve |
| 29 | **LMGTE; Am** | **88** | **(Germany) Team Felbermayr-Proton** | **(Germany) Christian Ried (Italy) Gianluca Roda (Italy) Paolo Ruberti** | **Porsche 997 GT3-RSR** | M | **298** | **+27 Laps** |
| 29 | **LMGTE; Am** | **88** | **(Germany) Team Felbermayr-Proton** | **(Germany) Christian Ried (Italy) Gianluca Roda (Italy) Paolo Ruberti** | **Porsche M97/74 4.0 L Flat-6** | M | **298** | **+27 Laps** |
| 30 | P2 | 54 | (United States) Black Swan Racing | (United States) Tim Pappas (United States) Bret Curtis (United States) Jon Fogarty | Lola B11/80 | D | 298 | +27 Laps |
| 30 | P2 | 54 | (United States) Black Swan Racing | (United States) Tim Pappas (United States) Bret Curtis (United States) Jon Fogarty | Honda HR28TT 2.8 L Turbo V6 | D | 298 | +27 Laps |
| 31 | LMGTE; Am | 70 | (France) Larbre Compétition | (France) Pascal Gibon (France) Christophe Bourret (France) Jean-Philippe Belloc | Chevrolet Corvette C6.R | M | 297 | +28 Laps |
| 31 | LMGTE; Am | 70 | (France) Larbre Compétition | (France) Pascal Gibon (France) Christophe Bourret (France) Jean-Philippe Belloc | Chevrolet LS5.5R 5.5 L V8 | M | 297 | +28 Laps |
| 32 | LMP1 | 12 | (Switzerland) Rebellion Racing | (France) Nicolas Prost (Switzerland) Neel Jani (Germany) Nick Heidfeld | Lola B11/60 | M | 296 | +29 Laps |
| 32 | LMP1 | 12 | (Switzerland) Rebellion Racing | (France) Nicolas Prost (Switzerland) Neel Jani (Germany) Nick Heidfeld | Toyota RV8KLM 3.4 L V8 | M | 296 | +29 Laps |
| 33 | **GTC** | **023** | **(United States) Alex Job Racing** | **(United States) Bill Sweedler (United States) Townsend Bell (South Africa) Dion von Moltke** | **Porsche 997 GT3 Cup** | Y | **292** | **+33 Laps** |
| 33 | **GTC** | **023** | **(United States) Alex Job Racing** | **(United States) Bill Sweedler (United States) Townsend Bell (South Africa) Dion von Moltke** | **Porsche M97/77 3.8 L Flat-6** | Y | **292** | **+33 Laps** |
| 34 | LMGTE; Pro | 97 | (United Kingdom) Aston Martin Racing | (Germany) Stefan Mücke (United Kingdom) Darren Turner (Mexico) Adrián Fernández | Aston Martin Vantage GTE | M | 292 | +33 Laps |
| 34 | LMGTE; Pro | 97 | (United Kingdom) Aston Martin Racing | (Germany) Stefan Mücke (United Kingdom) Darren Turner (Mexico) Adrián Fernández | Aston Martin 4.5 L V8 | M | 292 | +33 Laps |
| 35 | GTC | 022 | (United States) Alex Job Racing | (United States) Cooper MacNeil (United States) Leh Keen (Canada) Louis-Philippe Dumoulin | Porsche 997 GT3 Cup | Y | 291 | +34 Laps |
| 35 | GTC | 022 | (United States) Alex Job Racing | (United States) Cooper MacNeil (United States) Leh Keen (Canada) Louis-Philippe Dumoulin | Porsche M97/77 3.8 L Flat-6 | Y | 291 | +34 Laps |
| 36 | LMP1 | 13 | (Switzerland) Rebellion Racing | (Italy) Andrea Belicchi (Switzerland) Harold Primat (Netherlands) Jeroen Bleekemolen | Lola B11/60 | M | 291 | +34 Laps |
| 36 | LMP1 | 13 | (Switzerland) Rebellion Racing | (Italy) Andrea Belicchi (Switzerland) Harold Primat (Netherlands) Jeroen Bleekemolen | Toyota RV8KLM 3.4 L V8 | M | 291 | +34 Laps |
| 37 | GTC | 34 | (United States) Green Hornet Racing | (United States) Peter LeSaffre (Republic of Ireland) Damien Faulkner (Netherlands) Sebastiaan Bleekemolen | Porsche 997 GT3 Cup | Y | 290 | +35 Laps |
| 37 | GTC | 34 | (United States) Green Hornet Racing | (United States) Peter LeSaffre (Republic of Ireland) Damien Faulkner (Netherlands) Sebastiaan Bleekemolen | Porsche M97/77 3.8 L Flat-6 | Y | 290 | +35 Laps |
| 38 | GT | 17 | (United States) Team Falken Tire | (United States) Bryan Sellers (Germany) Wolf Henzler (Austria) Martin Ragginger | Porsche 997 GT3-RSR | F | 290 | +35 Laps |
| 38 | GT | 17 | (United States) Team Falken Tire | (United States) Bryan Sellers (Germany) Wolf Henzler (Austria) Martin Ragginger | Porsche M97/74 4.0 L Flat-6 | F | 290 | +35 Laps |
| 39 DNF | LMGTE; Am | 50 | (France) Larbre Compétition | (France) Patrick Bornhauser (France) Julien Canal (Portugal) Pedro Lamy | Chevrolet Corvette C6.R | M | 288 | Gearbox |
| 39 DNF | LMGTE; Am | 50 | (France) Larbre Compétition | (France) Patrick Bornhauser (France) Julien Canal (Portugal) Pedro Lamy | Chevrolet LS5.5R 5.5 L V8 | M | 288 | Gearbox |
| 40 | GTC | 66 | (United States) TRG | (United States) Spencer Pumpelly (United States) Marc Bunting (Venezuela) Emilio Di Guida | Porsche 997 GT3 Cup | Y | 287 | +38 Laps |
| 40 | GTC | 66 | (United States) TRG | (United States) Spencer Pumpelly (United States) Marc Bunting (Venezuela) Emilio Di Guida | Porsche M97/77 3.8 L Flat-6 | Y | 287 | +38 Laps |
| 41 | LMGTE; Am | 61 | (Italy) AF Corse-Waltrip | (United States) Robert Kauffman (United States) Michael Waltrip (Portugal) Rui Águas | Ferrari 458 Italia GT2 | M | 283 | +42 Laps |
| 41 | LMGTE; Am | 61 | (Italy) AF Corse-Waltrip | (United States) Robert Kauffman (United States) Michael Waltrip (Portugal) Rui Águas | Ferrari F136 4.5 L V8 | M | 283 | +42 Laps |
| 42 | PC | 5 | (United States) Muscle Milk Pickett Racing | (Mexico) Memo Gidley (United States) Michael Guasch (New Zealand) Roger Wills | Oreca FLM09 | M | 282 | +43 Laps |
| 42 | PC | 5 | (United States) Muscle Milk Pickett Racing | (Mexico) Memo Gidley (United States) Michael Guasch (New Zealand) Roger Wills | Chevrolet LS3 6.2 L V8 | M | 282 | +43 Laps |
| 43 | GTC | 11 | (United States) JDX Racing | (Canada) Chris Cumming (France) Kévin Estre (Germany) Mark Bullitt | Porsche 997 GT3 Cup | Y | 282 | +43 Laps |
| 43 | GTC | 11 | (United States) JDX Racing | (Canada) Chris Cumming (France) Kévin Estre (Germany) Mark Bullitt | Porsche M97/77 3.8 L Flat-6 | Y | 282 | +43 Laps |
| 44 | P2 | 37 | (United States) Conquest Endurance | (United Kingdom) Martin Plowman (Denmark) David Heinemeier Hansson (Belgium) Jan Heylen | Morgan LMP2 | D | 281 | +44 Laps |
| 44 | P2 | 37 | (United States) Conquest Endurance | (United Kingdom) Martin Plowman (Denmark) David Heinemeier Hansson (Belgium) Jan Heylen | Judd HK 3.6 L V8 | D | 281 | +44 Laps |
| 45 | GTC | 024 | (United States) Competition Motorsports | (United States) Bob Faieta (United States) Cort Wagner (United States) Michael Avenatti | Porsche 997 GT3 Cup | Y | 279 | +46 Laps |
| 45 | GTC | 024 | (United States) Competition Motorsports | (United States) Bob Faieta (United States) Cort Wagner (United States) Michael Avenatti | Porsche M97/77 3.8 L Flat-6 | Y | 279 | +46 Laps |
| 46 | GT | 01 | (United States) Extreme Speed Motorsports | (United States) Scott Sharp (United States) Johannes van Overbeek (United States) Guy Cosmo | Ferrari 458 Italia GT2 | M | 278 | +47 Laps |
| 46 | GT | 01 | (United States) Extreme Speed Motorsports | (United States) Scott Sharp (United States) Johannes van Overbeek (United States) Guy Cosmo | Ferrari F136 4.5 L V8 | M | 278 | +47 Laps |
| 47 | LMP2 | 28 | (United Arab Emirates) Gulf Racing Middle East | (France) Fabien Giroix (France) Maxime Jousse (Sweden) Stefan Johansson | Lola B12/80 | D | 277 | +48 Laps |
| 47 | LMP2 | 28 | (United Arab Emirates) Gulf Racing Middle East | (France) Fabien Giroix (France) Maxime Jousse (Sweden) Stefan Johansson | Nissan VK45DE 4.5 L V8 | D | 277 | +48 Laps |
| 48 | GTC | 32 | (United States) GMG Racing | (United States) James Sofronas (United States) Alex Welch (United States) René Villeneuve | Porsche 997 GT3 Cup | Y | 276 | +49 Laps |
| 48 | GTC | 32 | (United States) GMG Racing | (United States) James Sofronas (United States) Alex Welch (United States) René Villeneuve | Porsche M97/77 3.8 L Flat-6 | Y | 276 | +49 Laps |
| 49 | PC | 18 | (United States) Performance Tech Motorsports | (United States) Anthony Nicolosi (United States) Ricardo Vera (Brazil) Raphael Matos | Oreca FLM09 | M | 274 | +51 Laps |
| 49 | PC | 18 | (United States) Performance Tech Motorsports | (United States) Anthony Nicolosi (United States) Ricardo Vera (Brazil) Raphael Matos | Chevrolet LS3 6.2 L V8 | M | 274 | +51 Laps |
| 50 | LMGTE; Am | 57 | (United States) Krohn Racing | (United States) Tracy Krohn (Sweden) Niclas Jönsson (Italy) Michele Rugolo | Ferrari 458 Italia GT2 | D | 265 | +60 Laps |
| 50 | LMGTE; Am | 57 | (United States) Krohn Racing | (United States) Tracy Krohn (Sweden) Niclas Jönsson (Italy) Michele Rugolo | Ferrari F136 4.5 L V8 | D | 265 | +60 Laps |
| 51 | PC | 9 | (United States) RSR Racing | (Brazil) Bruno Junqueira (United States) Tomy Drissi (Mexico) Roberto González | Oreca FLM09 | M | 255 | +70 Laps |
| 51 | PC | 9 | (United States) RSR Racing | (Brazil) Bruno Junqueira (United States) Tomy Drissi (Mexico) Roberto González | Chevrolet LS3 6.2 L V8 | M | 255 | +70 Laps |
| 52 | LMGTE; Am | 55 | (United Kingdom) JWA-Avila | (United States) Bill Binnie (Switzerland) Joël Camathias (Finland) Markus Palttala | Porsche 997 GT3-RSR | P | 252 | +73 Laps |
| 52 | LMGTE; Am | 55 | (United Kingdom) JWA-Avila | (United States) Bill Binnie (Switzerland) Joël Camathias (Finland) Markus Palttala | Porsche M97/74 4.0 L Flat-6 | P | 252 | +73 Laps |
| 53 | GT | 45 | (United States) Flying Lizard Motorsports | (United States) Patrick Long (Germany) Jörg Bergmeister (Germany) Marco Holzer | Porsche 997 GT3-RSR | M | 251 | +74 Laps |
| 53 | GT | 45 | (United States) Flying Lizard Motorsports | (United States) Patrick Long (Germany) Jörg Bergmeister (Germany) Marco Holzer | Porsche M97/74 4.0 L Flat-6 | M | 251 | +74 Laps |
| 54 DNF | GTC | 031 | (United States) NGT Motorsport | (Denmark) Nicki Thiim (Venezuela) Angel Benitez Sr. (Venezuela) Angel Benitez Jr. | Porsche 997 GT3 Cup | Y | 236 | Accident |
| 54 DNF | GTC | 031 | (United States) NGT Motorsport | (Denmark) Nicki Thiim (Venezuela) Angel Benitez Sr. (Venezuela) Angel Benitez Jr. | Porsche M97/77 3.8 L Flat-6 | Y | 236 | Accident |
| 55 DNF | LMP1 | 15 | (France) OAK Racing | (France) Guillaume Moreau (Austria) Dominik Kraihamer (Belgium) Bertrand Baguette | OAK Pescarolo 01 | D | 233 | Engine |
| 55 DNF | LMP1 | 15 | (France) OAK Racing | (France) Guillaume Moreau (Austria) Dominik Kraihamer (Belgium) Bertrand Baguette | Judd DB 3.4 L V8 | D | 233 | Engine |
| 56 DNF | GTC | 30 | (United States) NGT Motorsport | (United Kingdom) Sean Edwards (United States) Henrique Cisneros (United States) Carlos Kauffman | Porsche 997 GT3 Cup | Y | 205 | Accident |
| 56 DNF | GTC | 30 | (United States) NGT Motorsport | (United Kingdom) Sean Edwards (United States) Henrique Cisneros (United States) Carlos Kauffman | Porsche M97/77 3.8 L Flat-6 | Y | 205 | Accident |
| 57 DNF | PC | 025 | (United States) Dempsey Racing | (United States) Duncan Ende (France) Henri Richard (United States) Dane Cameron | Oreca FLM09 | M | 172 | Accident |
| 57 DNF | PC | 025 | (United States) Dempsey Racing | (United States) Duncan Ende (France) Henri Richard (United States) Dane Cameron | Chevrolet LS3 6.2 L V8 | M | 172 | Accident |
| 58 DNF | P2 | 95 | (United States) Level 5 Motorsports | (United States) Scott Tucker (Mexico) Luis Díaz (United States) Ryan Hunter-Reay | HPD ARX-03b | D | 85 | Accident damage |
| 58 DNF | P2 | 95 | (United States) Level 5 Motorsports | (United States) Scott Tucker (Mexico) Luis Díaz (United States) Ryan Hunter-Reay | Honda HR28TT 2.8 L Turbo V6 | D | 85 | Accident damage |
| 59 DNF | LMP2 | 23 | (France) Signatech Nissan | (France) Franck Mailleux (France) Jordan Tresson (France) Olivier Lombard | Oreca 03 | D | 85 | Accident |
| 59 DNF | LMP2 | 23 | (France) Signatech Nissan | (France) Franck Mailleux (France) Jordan Tresson (France) Olivier Lombard | Nissan VK45DE 4.5 L V8 | D | 85 | Accident |
| 60 DNF | LMGTE; Pro | 59 | (France) Luxury Racing | (France) Frédéric Makowiecki (Brazil) Jaime Melo (France) Jean-Karl Vernay | Ferrari 458 Italia GT2 | M | 83 | Accident damage |
| 60 DNF | LMGTE; Pro | 59 | (France) Luxury Racing | (France) Frédéric Makowiecki (Brazil) Jaime Melo (France) Jean-Karl Vernay | Ferrari F136 4.5 L V8 | M | 83 | Accident damage |
| 61 DNF | PC | 8 | (United States) Merchant Services Racing | (Canada) Kyle Marcelli (United Kingdom) Dean Sterling (United States) Lucas Downs | Oreca FLM09 | M | 38 | Accident |
| 61 DNF | PC | 8 | (United States) Merchant Services Racing | (Canada) Kyle Marcelli (United Kingdom) Dean Sterling (United States) Lucas Downs | Chevrolet LS3 6.2 L V8 | M | 38 | Accident |
| 62 DNF | LMGTE; Am | 58 | (France) Luxury Racing | (Germany) Pierre Ehret (Germany) Dominik Farnbacher (France) François Jakubowski | Ferrari 458 Italia GT2 | M | 0 | Accident |
| 62 DNF | LMGTE; Am | 58 | (France) Luxury Racing | (Germany) Pierre Ehret (Germany) Dominik Farnbacher (France) François Jakubowski | Ferrari F136 4.5 L V8 | M | 0 | Accident |
| EX | LMGTE; Pro | 51 | (Italy) AF Corse | (Italy) Giancarlo Fisichella (Italy) Gianmaria Bruni (Finland) Toni Vilander | Ferrari 458 Italia GT2 | M | 215 | Disqualified |
| EX | LMGTE; Pro | 51 | (Italy) AF Corse | (Italy) Giancarlo Fisichella (Italy) Gianmaria Bruni (Finland) Toni Vilander | Ferrari F136 4.5 L V8 | M | 215 | Disqualified |
| EX | LMP2 | 29 | (United Arab Emirates) Gulf Racing Middle East | (Ivory Coast) Frédéric Fatien (Japan) Keiko Ihara (Switzerland) Jean-Denis Delétraz | Lola B12/80 | D | — | Excluded |
| EX | LMP2 | 29 | (United Arab Emirates) Gulf Racing Middle East | (Ivory Coast) Frédéric Fatien (Japan) Keiko Ihara (Switzerland) Jean-Denis Delétraz | Nissan VK45DE 4.5 L V8 | D | — | Excluded |

Tire manufacturers
Key
| Symbol | Tire manufacturer |
|---|---|
| **D** | Dunlop |
| **F** | Falken Tire |
| **M** | Michelin |
| **P** | Pirelli |
| **Y** | Yokohama |

== Championship standings after the race ==
World Drivers' Championship standings
| Pos. | Driver | Points |
|---|---|---|
| 1 | (Italy) Rinaldo Capello (Denmark) Tom Kristensen (United Kingdom) Allan McNish | 25 |
| 2 | (Germany) Timo Bernhard (France) Romain Dumas (France) Loïc Duval | 18 (−7) |
| 3 | (United Kingdom) Ryan Dalziel (Venezuela) Enzo Potolicchio (France) Stéphane Sarrazin | 15 (−10) |
| 4 | (France) Matthieu Lahaye (France) Jacques Nicolet (France) Olivier Pla | 12 (−13) |
| 5 | (France) Jean-Christophe Boullion (France) Emmanuel Collard (France) Julien Jousse | 10 (−15) |

LMP1 Manufacturers' World Championship standings
| Pos. | Manufacturer | Points |
|---|---|---|
| 1 | (Germany) Audi | 25 |

LMGTE Manufacturers' World Cup standings
| Pos. | Manufacturer | Points |
|---|---|---|
| 1 | (Italy) Ferrari | 33 |
| 2 | (Germany) Porsche | 33 (−0) |
| 3 | (United States) Chevrolet | 22 (−11) |

Endurance Trophy for LMP1 Teams standings
| Pos. | Team | Points |
|---|---|---|
| 1 | (France) Pescarolo Team | 25 |
| 2 | (United Kingdom) Strakka Racing | 18 (−7) |
| 3 | (United Kingdom) JRM | 15 (−10) |
| 4 | (Switzerland) Rebellion Racing | 12 (−13) |
| 5 | (France) OAK Racing | 8 (−17) |

Endurance Trophy For LMP2 Teams standings
| Pos. | Team | Points |
|---|---|---|
| 1 | (United States) Starworks Motorsport | 25 |
| 2 | (France) OAK Racing | 18 (−7) |
| 3 | (Argentina) Pecom Racing | 15 (−10) |
| 4 | (United Kingdom) Greaves Motorsport | 12 (−13) |
| 5 | (United Kingdom) ADR-Delta | 10 (−15) |

Endurance Trophy For LMGTE Pro Teams standings
| Pos. | Team | Points |
|---|---|---|
| 1 | (Italy) AF Corse | 25 |
| 2 | (Germany) Team Felbermayr-Proton | 18 (−7) |
| 3 | (United Kingdom) Aston Martin Racing | 15 (−10) |

Endurance Trophy For LMGTE Am Teams standings
| Pos. | Team | Points |
|---|---|---|
| 1 | (Germany) Team Felbermayr-Proton | 25 |
| 2 | (France) Larbre Compétition | 18 (−7) |
| 3 | (Italy) AF Corse-Waltrip | 15 (−10) |
| 4 | (United States) Krohn Racing | 12 (−13) |
| 5 | (United Kingdom) JWA-Avila | 10 (−15) |

P1 Drivers' Championship standings
| Pos. | Driver | Points |
|---|---|---|
| 1 | (United States) Chris Dyson (United Kingdom) Steven Kane (United Kingdom) Guy Smith | 24 |
| 2 | (Germany) Klaus Graf (Germany) Lucas Luhr | 20 (−4) |

P2 Drivers' Championship standings
| Pos. | Driver | Points |
|---|---|---|
| 1 | (Portugal) João Barbosa (France) Christophe Bouchut (United Kingdom) Scott Tucker | 24 |
| 2 | (United States) Jon Fogarty (United States) Tim Pappas | 20 (−4) |
| 3 | (Denmark) David Heinemeier Hansson (United Kingdom) Martin Plowman | 17 (−7) |

PC Drivers' Championship standings
| Pos. | Driver | Points |
|---|---|---|
| 1 | (Venezuela) Alex Popow (Venezuela) E. J. Viso | 24 |
| 2 | (United States) Ken Dobson (Mexico) Rudy Junco Jr. (United States) Butch Leitzinger | 20 (−4) |
| 3 | (United States) Jon Bennett (United States) Colin Braun | 17 (−7) |
| 4 | (Mexico) Javier Echeverria (Mexico) Pablo Sanchez | 14 (−10) |
| 5 | (United States) Memo Gidley (United States) Mike Guasch | 12 (−12) |

GT Drivers' Championship standings
| Pos. | Driver | Points |
|---|---|---|
| 1 | (United States) Joey Hand (Germany) Dirk Müller (United States) Jonathan Summerton | 24 |
| 2 | (Spain) Antonio García (Denmark) Jan Magnussen (United States) Jordan Taylor | 20 (−4) |
| 3 | (United Kingdom) Oliver Gavin (United States) Tommy Milner (United Kingdom) Richard Westbrook | 17 (−7) |
| 4 | (Germany) Uwe Alzen (United States) Bill Auberlen (Germany) Jörg Müller | 14 (−10) |
| 5 | (United Kingdom) Rob Bell (Germany) Sascha Maassen (United States) Bryce Miller | 12 (−12) |

GTC Drivers' Championship standings
| Pos. | Driver | Points |
|---|---|---|
| 1 | (South Africa) Dion von Moltke | 24 |
| 2 | (United States) Leh Keen (United States) Cooper MacNeil | 20 (−4) |
| 3 | (Netherlands) Sebastiaan Bleekemolen (Republic of Ireland) Damien Faulkner (United States) Peter LeSaffre | 17 (−7) |
| 4 | (United States) Marc Bunting (United States) Spencer Pumpelly | 14 (−10) |
| 5 | (Canada) Chris Cumming (France) Kévin Estre | 12 (−12) |

P1 Teams' Championship standings
| Pos. | Team | Points |
|---|---|---|
| 1 | (United States) Dyson Racing Team | 24 |
| 2 | (United States) Muscle Milk Pickett Racing | 20 (−4) |

P2 Teams' Championship standings
| Pos. | Team | Points |
|---|---|---|
| 1 | (United States) Level 5 Motorsports | 24 |
| 2 | (United States) Black Swan Racing | 20 (−4) |
| 3 | (United States) Conquest Endurance | 17 (−7) |

PC Teams' Championship standings
| Pos. | Team | Points |
|---|---|---|
| 1 | (United States) CORE Autosport | 24 |
| 2 | (United States) PR1/Mathiasen Motorsports | 20 (−4) |
| 3 | (United States) Merchant Services Racing | 14 (−10) |
| 4 | (United States) Muscle Milk Pickett Racing | 12 (−12) |
| 5 | (United States) Performance Tech Motorsports | 10 (−14) |

GT Teams' Championship standings
| Pos. | Team | Points |
|---|---|---|
| 1 | (United States) BMW Team RLL | 24 |
| 2 | (United States) Corvette Racing | 20 (−4) |
| 3 | (United States) Paul Miller Racing | 12 (−12) |
| 4 | (United States) Flying Lizard Motorsports | 10 (−14) |
| 5 | (United States) Extreme Speed Motorsports | 8 (−16) |

GTC Teams' Championship standings
| Pos. | Team | Points |
|---|---|---|
| 1 | (United States) Alex Job Racing | 24 |
| 2 | (United States) Green Hornet Racing | 17 (−7) |
| 3 | (United States) TRG | 14 (−10) |
| 4 | (United States) JDX Racing | 12 (−12) |
| 5 | (United States) Competition Motorsports | 10 (−14) |

== Notes ==
FIA World Endurance Championship
| Previous race: None | 2012 season | Next race: 6 Hours of Spa-Francorchamps |

American Le Mans Series
| Previous race: None | 2012 season | Next race: American Le Mans Series at Long Beach |
