= Lucas Luhr =

German racing driver (born 1979)

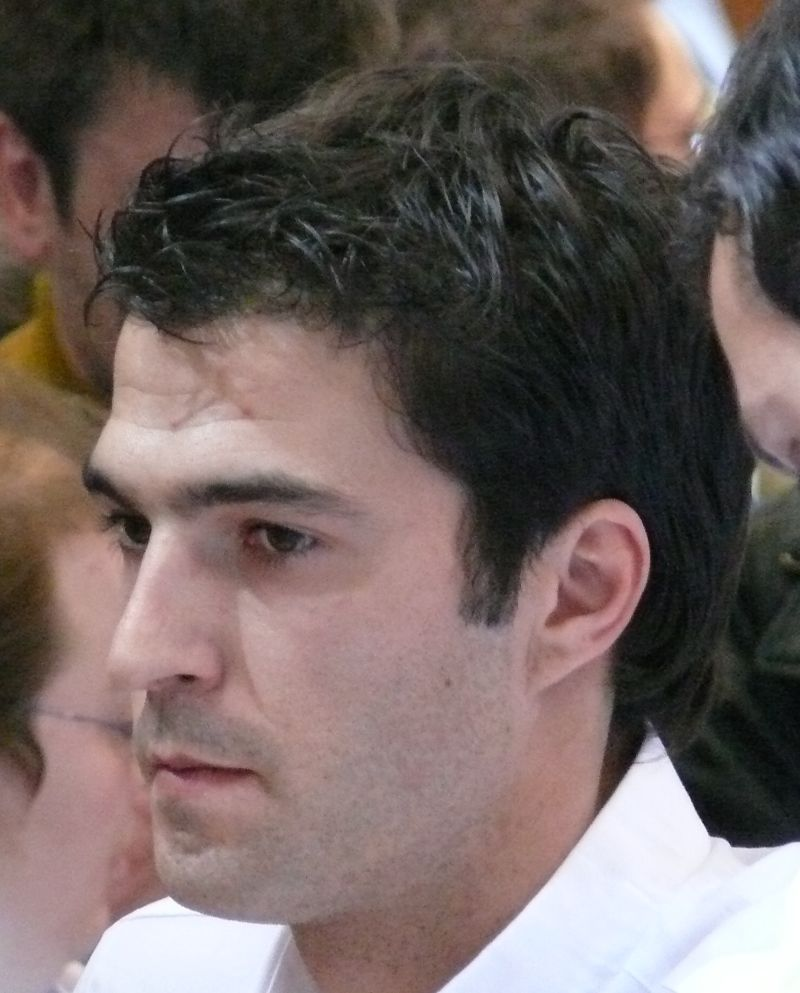
- Luhr in 2007
- Nationality: German
- Born: 22 July 1979 (age 47) Mülheim-Kärlich, West Germany
- Categorisation: FIA Platinum (until 2021); FIA Gold (2022–)
24 Hours of Le Mans career
- Years: 2000, 2002–2003, 2007–2009, 2011, 2013
- Teams: Dick Barbour Racing, The Racer's Group, Alex Job Racing, Audi Sport Team Joest, JR Motorsports, Flying Lizard Motorsports, Flying Lizard Motorsports, Muscle Milk Racing, Starworks Motorsport, BMW Motorsport
- Best finish: 1st in LMGT (2002, 2003)
- Class wins: 2 (2002, 2003)

Lucas Luhr (born 22 July 1979) is a German racing driver. He is a staple of the American Le Mans Series during the 2000s and early 2010s, winning the GT class with Porsche in 2002, the LMP2 category in 2006, and taking the overall LMP1 championship as part of the Audi Sport North America works outfit in 2008. He also won the P1 title in 2012 and 2013, driving for Honda-fielding Muscle Milk Pickett Racing.

Luhr's GT successes in Europe included class victories at the 2002 and 2003 24 Hours of Le Mans races with Porsche, as well as the 2011 FIA GT1 World Championship title. In 2014, Luhr became a BMW factory driver, with whom he won the 2015 24 Hours of Spa, before departing in 2017.

== Early career ==
Born in Mülheim-Kärlich, Luhr began his career in karts in 1989. Throughout the early 1990s, he won several local and national karting trophies. He became a factory driver for the CRG company in 1994, winning the European Karting Championship and placing fourth in the Karting World Championship. In 1995, he moved to the Jolly Kart factory team, competing in the European and World championships.

Luhr moved to cars in 1996, becoming vice-champion of the German Formula Ford championship. He raced in the German Formula Three Championship in 1997 and 1998, winning the 1998 season opening round at the Hockenheimring.

== Porsche factory career ==
Luhr became a Porsche factory driver for the 1999 season. He won the 1999 Porsche Carrera Cup Deutschland championship driving for the UPS Junior Team. In 2000, he moved to the American Le Mans Series, driving a Porsche 911 GT3-R for Dick Barbour Racing and partnering with Dirk Müller. He collected class wins in the 12 Hours of Sebring, 24 Hours of Le Mans, 1000 km Nürburgring, and Race of 1000 Years in Adelaide, as well as the ALMS GT class championship in his first season.

Luhr began the 2001 season with a class win in the 24 Hours of Daytona, driving for White Lightning Racing. In the ALMS, he partnered with Sascha Maassen at Alex Job Racing, again in a 911. The duo won the 12 Hours of Sebring, but had a disappointing season as the BMW M3 GTRs dominated the season. Luhr and Maassen finished fourth in the championship.

In 2002, Luhr and Maassen dominated the ALMS GT class, winning seven of ten races, including Sebring and Petit Le Mans. Luhr also won the GT class at Le Mans, driving with Kevin Buckler and Timo Bernhard for The Racer's Group.

For 2003, Luhr continued his winning ways with Maassen and AJR. The duo Sebring for the third straight year, giving Luhr his fourth straight class win, tying him with Bob Holbert for most consecutive class wins. In June, the pair, joined by Emmanuel Collard, captured the GT class at Le Mans. Luhr and Maassen would take five wins from nine races and win the ALMS GT championship for the second straight year.

After a second place at Sebring, Luhr moved to the FIA GT Championship for the 2004 season. He and Maassen won six races driving for Friesinger Motorsport and won their third consecutive championship together.

In 2005, Luhr's primary job was the development of the new Porsche RS Spyder, which was to make its full-time debut in 2006. He also raced in the big events in 911s, winning the 12 Hours of Sebring and the Spa 24 Hours. Luhr also won the Laguna Seca 4 Hours LMP2 class, in the debut race of the RS Spyder.

For 2006, Luhr rejoined Maassen, but moved to Penske Racing to drive the RS Spyder. The duo had a rough start to the season, netting only one class win. Luhr would finish the season driving with Romain Dumas and take two more victories to end as vice-champion with Maassen. Luhr also won the 24 Hours Nürburgring overall, driving with Timo Bernhard, Marcel Tiemann, and Mike Rockenfeller.

== Audi career ==
For 2007, Luhr became a factory Audi driver. Luhr raced in the Deutsche Tourenwagen Masters (DTM) series, driving an Audi A4 DTM for Audi Sport Team Rosberg. He participated in the 24 Hours of Le Mans, driving the LMP1 class R10 TDI.

In 2008, Luhr drove in the American Le Mans Series with Marco Werner in an Audi R10, the pair won the LMP1 class drivers title after six overall wins and eight class wins. He was also fourth overall at Le Mans.

In the 2009 24 Hours of Le Mans race, Luhr crashed Audi's new R15 TDI into a tire wall during the seventh hour. Audi ruled out a technical defect on the car.

For 2010, Luhr drove in select events for Audi factory-supported teams in GT races. He competed in the VLN and at the Nürburgring 24 Hours for Team Abt Sportsline, and also for Phoenix Racing at the Spa 24 Hours. He also competed in the Rolex 24 at Daytona finishing third for Level 5 Motorsports.

== Post-Audi career ==
In 2011, Luhr competed in the FIA GT1 World Championship for JR Motorsports, winning the drivers' championship with Michael Krumm in a Nissan GT-R.

For 2012, Luhr competed in the American Le Mans Series for Muscle Milk Motorsports, where he was the LMP1 champion and the Rolex Sports Car Series for Starworks Motorsport where he finished 12th in points with one race win. In 2013, he returned to Muscle Milk in ALMS LMP1 and also won the 24 Hours Nürburgring SP7 class in a Manthey Racing Porsche.

On 26 July 2013, it was announced that Luhr would make his IndyCar Series debut with Sarah Fisher Hartman Racing at Sonoma Raceway in conjunction with RW Motorsports. It was his first open wheel race since he competed in German Formula Three in 1998.

== Personal life ==
In October 2016, Luhr was arrested for public indecency after allegedly urinating in a RaceTrac parking lot near Road Atlanta in Georgia at 2 a.m. in the morning.

== Top Speed ==
Luhr was featured, along with Marion Jones and Marla Streb, in the large format film, Top Speed, hosted by Tim Allen. Luhr's appearance in the film focuses on his championships in the 24 Hours of Le Mans while he was driving for Porsche. The film was produced by MacGillivray Freeman Films.

== Accolades ==
- FIA GT1 World Championship GT1 class champion: 2011
- American Le Mans Series LMP1 class champion: 2008, 2012, 2013
- American Le Mans Series LMP2 class champion: 2006
- American Le Mans Series GT class champion: 2000, 2002, 2003
- FIA GT N-GT class champion: 2004
- 24 Hours of Le Mans GT class winner: 2000, 2002, 2003
- 12 Hours of Sebring GT/GT2 class winner: 2000, 2001, 2002, 2003, 2005
- 24 Hours Nürburgring overall winner: 2006, 2011
- Spa 24 Hours GT2 class winner: 2005
- Petit Le Mans GT class winner: 2002
- 24 Hours of Daytona GT class winner: 2001
- Porsche Supercup champion: 1999

== Racing record ==
=== American Le Mans Series results ===
(key) (Races in bold indicate pole position; results in italics indicate fastest lap)

Year	Team	Class	Make	Engine	1	2	3	4	5	6	7	8	9	10	11	12	Pos.	Points	Ref
2000	Dick Barbour Racing	GT	Porsche 911 GT3-R	Porsche 3.6 L Flat-6	SEB; 1	CHA; 10	SIL; 4	NÜR; 1	SON; 1	MOS; DNF	TEX; 3	ROS; 11	PET; 3†	MON; 10	LSV; 2	ADE; 1	2nd	216	
2001	Alex Job Racing	GT	Porsche 911 GT3-RS	Porsche 3.6 L Flat-6	TEX; 1	SEB; 1	DON; 1	JAR; 8	SON; 5	POR; 2	MOS; 4	MID; 6†	MON; 3	PET; 3			4th	176	
2002	Alex Job Racing	GT	Porsche 911 GT3-RS	Porsche 3.6 L Flat-6	SEB; 1	SON; 1	MID; DNF	AME; 2	WAS; 1	TRO; 1	MOS; 3	MON; 1	MIA; 1	PET; 1			1st	245	
2003	Alex Job Racing	GT	Porsche 911 GT3-RS	Porsche 3.6 L Flat-6	SEB; 1	ATL; 2	SON; 1	TRO; 1	MOS; 4	ELK; 4	LAG; 1	MIA; 1	PET; 2				1st	164	
2004	Alex Job Racing	GT	Porsche 911 GT3-RSR	Porsche 3.6 L Flat-6	SEB; 2	MID											17th	40	
2004	BAM!	GT	Porsche 911 GT3-RSR	Porsche 3.6 L Flat-6			LIM; DNF	SON; DNF	POR; DNF	MOS	AME	PET; 6	MON; 8				17th	40	
2005	Petersen Motorsports White Lightning Racing	GT2	Porsche 911 GT3-RSR	Porsche 3.6 L Flat-6	SEB; 1	ATL	MDO	LRP	SON	POR	ELK	MOS	PET				21st	26	
2005	Penske Racing	LMP2	Porsche RS Spyder	Porsche MR6 3.4 L V8										LAG; 1			11th	23	
2006	Penske Racing	LMP2	Porsche RS Spyder	Porsche MR6 3.4 L V8	SEB; 2†	TEX; 3†	MID; 2	LIM; 2	UTA; 1	POR; 2†	AME; 2	MOS; 1	PET; 2	MON; 1			1st	184	
2007	Audi Sport North America	LMP1	Audi R10 TDI	Audi TDI 5.5 L Turbo V12 (Diesel)	SEB	STP	LNB	TEX	UTA	LIM	MID	AME	MOS	DET	PET; 4		22nd	16th	
2007	Petersen Motorsports White Lightning Racing	GT2	Ferrari F430GT	Ferrari 4.0L V8												MON; DNF	NC	-	
2008	Audi Sport North America	LMP1	Audi R10 TDI	Audi TDI 5.5 L Turbo V12 (Diesel)	SEB; 2	**STP**; **1**	**LBH**; **1**	**UTA**; **1**	LRP; 1	**MDO**; **1**	ELK; 1	MOS; 1	**DET**; **DNF**	PET; 3	LAG; 1		1st	219	
2009	Audi Sport North America	LMP1	Audi R15 TDI	Audi TDI 5.5 L Turbo V10 (Diesel)	SEB; 3	STP	LBH	UTA	LRP	MDO	ELK	MOS	PET; 4	LAG			17th	43	
2010	Muscle Milk Team Cytosport	LMP2	Porsche RS Spyder Evo	Porsche MR6 3.4 L V8	SEB	LBH	MON	UTA	LIM	MDO	ROA	MOS	PET; 2				17th	26	
2011	Muscle Milk Aston Martin Racing	LMP1	Lola-Aston Martin B08/62	Aston Martin 6.0 L V12	SEB; DNF	LBH; 1	LRP; 2	**MOS**; **1**	MDO; 1	**ELK**; **1**	BAL	LAG; 5	PET; DNF				3rd	114	
2012	Muscle Milk Pickett Racing	P1	HPD ARX-03a	Honda LM-V8 3.4 L V8	SEB; 8†	LBH; 1	**LAG**; **1**	LRP; 1	MOS; 1	MDO; 1	ELK; 2	BAL; 3†	VIR; 1	PET; 3			1st	195	
2013	Muscle Milk Pickett Racing	P1	HPD ARX-03a	Honda LM-V8 3.4 L V8	SEB; 4	LBH; 1	LAG; 1										1st	182	
2013	Muscle Milk Pickett Racing	P1	HPD ARX-03c	Honda LM-V8 3.4 L V8				**LRP**; **1**	**MOS**; **1**	ELK; 1	BAL; 1	COA; 1	VIR; 1	PET; DNF			1st	182	

^{†} Did not finish the race but was classified as his car completed more than 70% of the overall winner's race distance.

=== 24 Hours of Le Mans results ===
Year	Team	Co-Drivers	Car	Class	Laps	Pos.	Class Pos.
2000	(United States) Dick Barbour Racing	(Germany) Dirk Müller (France) Bob Wollek	Porsche 911 GT3-R	GT	319	**DSQ**	**DSQ**
2002	(United States) The Racer's Group	(United States) Kevin Buckler (Germany) Timo Bernhard	Porsche 911 GT3-RS	GT	322	16th	**1st**
2003	(United States) Alex Job Racing (United States) Petersen Motorsports	(Germany) Sascha Maassen (France) Emmanuel Collard	Porsche 911 GT3-RS	GT	320	14th	**1st**
2007	(Germany) Audi Sport Team Joest	(Germany) Mike Rockenfeller (France) Alexandre Prémat	Audi R10 TDI	LMP1	23	DNF	DNF
2008	(Germany) Audi Sport Team Joest	(Germany) Mike Rockenfeller (France) Alexandre Prémat	Audi R10 TDI	LMP1	374	4th	4th
2009	(Germany) Audi Sport North America	(Germany) Marco Werner (Germany) Mike Rockenfeller	Audi R15 TDI	LMP1	104	DNF	DNF
2011	(United States) Flying Lizard Motorsports	(Germany) Jörg Bergmeister (United States) Patrick Long	Porsche 997 GT3-RSR	GTE; Pro	310	18th	6th
2013	(United Kingdom) Jota Sport	(United Kingdom) Simon Dolan (United Kingdom) Oliver Turvey	Zytek Z11SN-Nissan	LMP2	319	13th	7th

=== Complete DTM results ===
(key) (Races in bold indicate pole position) (Races in italics indicate fastest lap)

Year	Team	Car	1	2	3	4	5	6	7	8	9	10	Pos	Points
2007	Team Rosberg	Audi A4 DTM 2006	HOC; 11	OSC; 12	LAU; 14	BRH; 11	NOR; 18†	MUG; Ret	ZAN; 16	NÜR; 16	CAT; 8†	HOC; 12	17th	1

† Retired, but was classified as he completed over 90% of the race winner's distance.

=== Complete GT1 World Championship results ===
Year	Team	Car	1	2	3	4	5	6	7	8	9	10	11	12	13	14	15	16	17	18	19	20	Pos	Points
2011	JR Motorsports	Nissan GT-R	ABU; QR; 3	ABU; CR; 14	ZOL; QR; 7	ZOL; CR; 9	ALG; QR; 2	ALG; CR; 1	SAC; QR; 11	SAC; CR; 9	SIL; QR; 2	SIL; CR; 1	NAV; QR; 9	NAV; CR; 6	PRI; QR; 1	PRI; CR; 1	ORD; QR; 11	ORD; CR; 9	BEI; QR; 4	BEI; CR; 3	SAN; QR; 2	SAN; CR; Ret	**1st**	**137**

=== IndyCar Series results ===
(key) (Races in bold indicate pole position) (Races in italics indicate fastest lap)

Year	Team	Chassis	No.	Engine	1	2	3	4	5	6	7	8	9	10	11	12	13	14	15	16	17	18	19	Rank	Points	Ref
2013	Sarah Fisher Hartman Racing	Dallara DW12	97	Honda	STP	ALA	LBH	SAO	INDY	DET1	DET2	TXS	MIL	IOW	POC	TOR1	TOR2	MDO	SNM; 22	BAL	HOU1	HOU2	FON	36th	8	

=== Complete WeatherTech SportsCar Championship results ===
(key) (Races in bold indicate pole position) (Races in italics indicate fastest lap)

Year	Team	Class	Make	Engine	1	2	3	4	5	6	7	8	9	10	11	Pos.	Points	Ref
2014	Muscle Milk Pickett Racing	P	Oreca 03	Nissan VK45DE 4.5 L V8	DAY; 5	SEB; 13	LBH	LAG	DET	WGL	MOS	IMS	ROA	COA	PET	36th	46	
2015	BMW Team RLL	GTLM	BMW Z4 GTE	BMW 4.4 L V8	DAY; 4	SEB; 4	LBH; 5	LAG; 1	WGI; 8	MOS; 2	ROA; 6	VIR; 4	AUS; 7	PET; 2		5th	291	
2016	BMW Team RLL	GTLM	BMW M6 GTLM	BMW S63 4.4 L Twin Turbo V8	DAY; 11	SEB; 6	LBH; 10	LGA; 10	WGL; 8	MOS; 9	LIM; 9	ELK; 3	VIR; 8	COT; 7	PET; 6	9th	267	

=== Complete NASCAR results ===
==== Whelen Euro Series – EuroNASCAR PRO ====
(key) (Bold – Pole position. Italics – Fastest lap. * – Most laps led. ^ – Most positions gained)

NASCAR Whelen Euro Series – EuroNASCAR PRO results
Year	Team	No.	Make	1	2	3	4	5	6	7	8	9	10	11	12	NWES	Pts
2022	Racingfuel Motorsport	58	Chevy	ESP; 8	ESP; 17	GBR	GBR	ITA	ITA	CZE	CZE	BEL	BEL	CRO	CRO	34th	50

^{*} Season still in progress.

Sporting positions
Preceded by Dirk Müller	Porsche Carrera Cup Germany champion 1999	Succeeded by Jörg Bergmeister
Preceded by Allan McNish; Rinaldo Capello	American Le Mans Series champion 2008 with Marco Werner	Succeeded by David Brabham; Scott Sharp
Preceded by Michael Bartels; Andrea Bertolini	FIA GT1 World Champion; 2011 with: Michael Krumm	Succeeded by Marc Basseng; Markus Winkelhock
Preceded by Chris Dyson; Guy Smith	American Le Mans Series champion 2012-2013 with Klaus Graf	Succeeded by End Series
