= HPD LM-V8 engine =

HPD LM-V8 engine Acura/HPD LM-AR6 engine Acura AL7R engine

Overview
- Manufacturer: Honda Performance Development
- Production: 2007-2013

Layout
- Configuration: V8, naturally-aspirated, 90° cylinder angle
- Displacement: 3.4 L (3,397 cc)
- Cylinder bore: 93 mm (3.66 in)
- Piston stroke: 62.5 mm (2.46 in)
- Cylinder block material: Aluminium
- Cylinder head material: Aluminium
- Valvetrain: 32-valve (four-valves per cylinder), DOHC

RPM range
- Max. engine speed: 10,000 rpm

Combustion
- Fuel system: Gasoline direct injection
- Management: Continental/Acura ECU
- Fuel type: VP MS100 E10, 100-octane gasoline + 10% ethanol (ALMS)
- Oil system: Dry sump
- Cooling system: mechanically water cooled

Output
- Power output: 480 hp (358 kW; 487 PS)
- Torque output: 450 N⋅m (332 lb⋅ft)

The HPD LM-V8 engine (also called the Acura/HPD LM-AR6 and Acura AL7R) is a naturally aspirated, four-stroke, 3.4-liter, V8 racing engine, designed and produced by Honda Performance Development (HPD) for use in multiple Le Mans Prototype race cars, from 2007 to 2013.

In its debut race at the 2007 12 Hours of Sebring, Andretti Green Racing finished first in the LMP2 class and second overall in an Acura ARX-01a-Courage chassis.

== Design ==
The LM-V8 was the first engine to be solely designed and developed by HPD in its facilities in Santa Clarita, California. The engine is mated to a jointly developed HPD-Hewland 6-speed sequential with manual paddle-operated selection and breathes through a 40.7mm inlet restrictor.

== Achievements ==
=== American Le Mans Series Championships ===
Year	Team	Chassis	Class
2009	(Mexico) Lowe's Fernández Racing	Acura ARX-01B	LMP2
2010	(United States) Patrón Highcroft Racing	HPD ARX-01C	LMP
2012	(United States) Muscle Milk Pickett Racing	HPD ARX-03a	P1
2013	(United States) Muscle Milk Pickett Racing	HPD ARX-03a	P1

=== Other Championships/Wins ===
Year	Series/Event	Team	Chassis	Class	Note
2010	Le Mans Series	(United Kingdom) RML	Lola B08/80	LMP2	1st in 1000 km of Algarve
2010	24 Hours of Le Mans	(United Kingdom) Strakka Racing	HPD ARX-01C	LMP2	Qualified on class pole

== Applications ==
- Acura ARX-01a, 01b, 01c, 01e
- HPD ARX-03a, 03c
- Lola B08/80
- Pescarolo 01
