= 2007 12 Hours of Sebring =

Sports car endurance race

Track map of the Sebring International Raceway

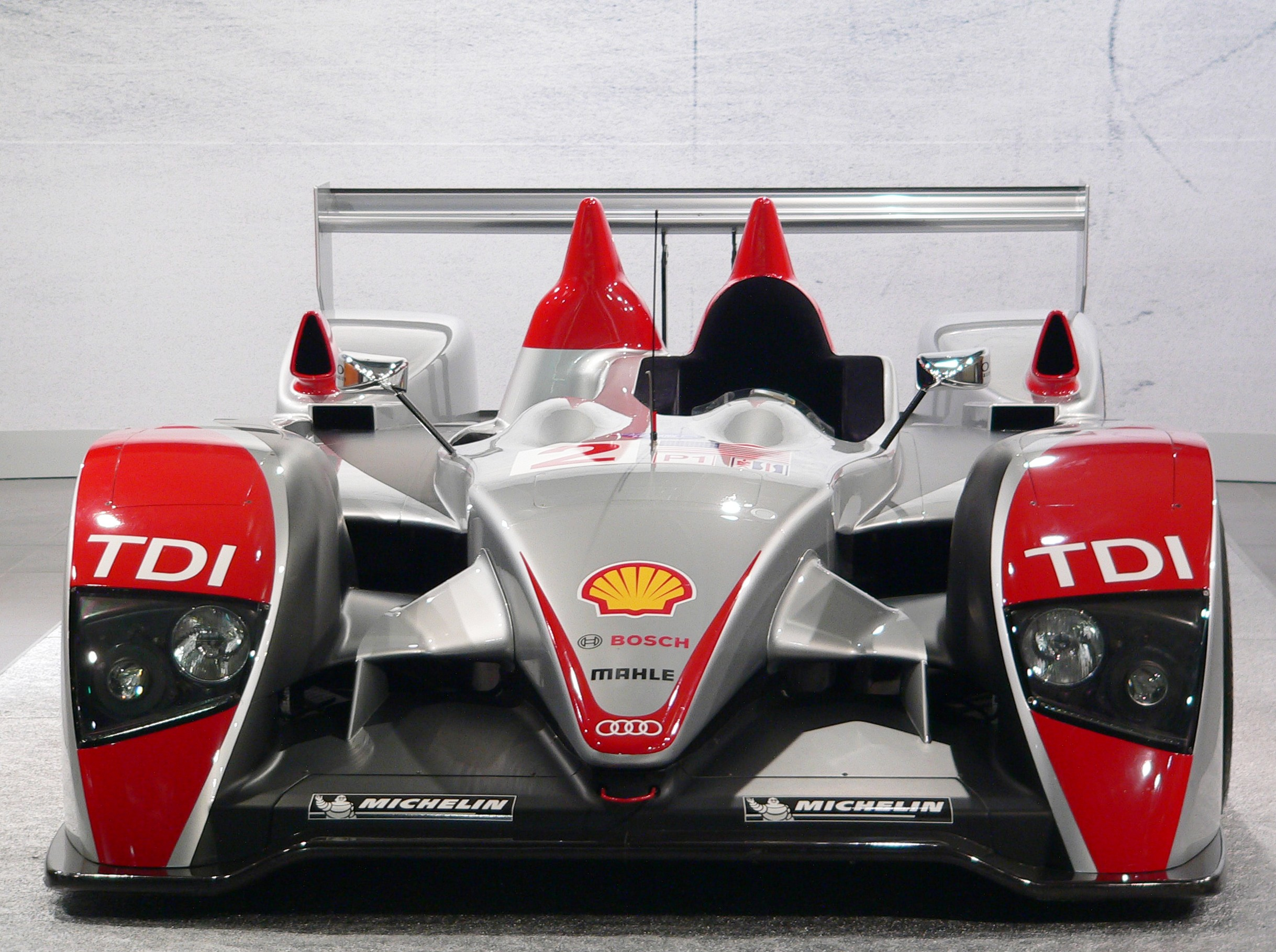
Audi R10 TDI

The 2007 Mobil 1 12 Hours of Sebring was the 55th running of this event and the opening round of the 2007 American Le Mans Series that took place on March 17, 2007.

== Official results ==
Class winners are in bold. Cars failing to complete 75% of winner's distance marked as Not Classified (NC).

Pos	Class	No	Team	Drivers	Chassis	Tyre	Laps
Pos	Class	No	Team	Drivers	Engine	Tyre	Laps
1	**LMP1**	**2**	**(United States) Audi Sport North America**	**(Germany) Marco Werner (Italy) Emanuele Pirro (Germany) Frank Biela**	**Audi R10 TDI**	MI	**364**
1	**LMP1**	**2**	**(United States) Audi Sport North America**	**(Germany) Marco Werner (Italy) Emanuele Pirro (Germany) Frank Biela**	**Audi TDI 5.5L Turbo V12 (Diesel)**	MI	**364**
2	**LMP2**	**26**	**(United States) Andretti Green Racing**	**(United States) Bryan Herta (United Kingdom) Dario Franchitti (Brazil) Tony Kanaan**	**Acura (Courage) ARX-01a**	MI	**358**
2	**LMP2**	**26**	**(United States) Andretti Green Racing**	**(United States) Bryan Herta (United Kingdom) Dario Franchitti (Brazil) Tony Kanaan**	**Acura AL7R 3.4L V8**	MI	**358**
3	LMP2	15	(Mexico) Lowe's Fernández Racing	(Mexico) Adrian Fernández (Mexico) Luis Diaz	Lola B06/43	MI	356
3	LMP2	15	(Mexico) Lowe's Fernández Racing	(Mexico) Adrian Fernández (Mexico) Luis Diaz	Acura AL7R 3.4L V8	MI	356
4	LMP1	1	(United States) Audi Sport North America	(United Kingdom) Allan McNish (Italy) Rinaldo Capello (Denmark) Tom Kristensen	Audi R10 TDI	MI	353
4	LMP1	1	(United States) Audi Sport North America	(United Kingdom) Allan McNish (Italy) Rinaldo Capello (Denmark) Tom Kristensen	Audi TDI 5.5L Turbo V12 (Diesel)	MI	353
5	LMP2	7	(United States) Penske Racing	(France) Romain Dumas (Germany) Timo Bernhard (Brazil) Hélio Castroneves	Porsche RS Spyder Evo	MI	351
5	LMP2	7	(United States) Penske Racing	(France) Romain Dumas (Germany) Timo Bernhard (Brazil) Hélio Castroneves	Porsche MR6 3.4L V8	MI	351
6	LMP2	9	(United States) Highcroft Racing	(Australia) David Brabham (Sweden) Stefan Johansson (United States) Duncan Dayton	Acura (Courage) ARX-01a	MI	346
6	LMP2	9	(United States) Highcroft Racing	(Australia) David Brabham (Sweden) Stefan Johansson (United States) Duncan Dayton	Acura AL7R 3.4L V8	MI	346
7	**GT1**	**4**	**(United States) Corvette Racing**	**(United Kingdom) Oliver Gavin (Monaco) Olivier Beretta (Italy) Max Papis**	**Chevrolet Corvette C6.R**	MI	**341**
7	**GT1**	**4**	**(United States) Corvette Racing**	**(United Kingdom) Oliver Gavin (Monaco) Olivier Beretta (Italy) Max Papis**	**Chevrolet LS7-R 7.0L V8**	MI	**341**
8	GT1	3	(United States) Corvette Racing	(United States) Johnny O'Connell (Denmark) Jan Magnussen (Canada) Ron Fellows	Chevrolet Corvette C6.R	MI	341
8	GT1	3	(United States) Corvette Racing	(United States) Johnny O'Connell (Denmark) Jan Magnussen (Canada) Ron Fellows	Chevrolet LS7-R 7.0L V8	MI	341
9	LMP2	16	(United States) Dyson Racing	(United States) Butch Leitzinger (United Kingdom) Andy Wallace (United States) Andy Lally	Porsche RS Spyder Evo	MI	340
9	LMP2	16	(United States) Dyson Racing	(United States) Butch Leitzinger (United Kingdom) Andy Wallace (United States) Andy Lally	Porsche MR6 3.4L V8	MI	340
10	LMP2	20	(United States) Dyson Racing	(United States) Chris Dyson (United Kingdom) Guy Smith	Porsche RS Spyder Evo	MI	333
10	LMP2	20	(United States) Dyson Racing	(United States) Chris Dyson (United Kingdom) Guy Smith	Porsche MR6 3.4L V8	MI	333
11	GT1	63	(United Kingdom) Team Modena	(Spain) Antonio Garcia (United States) Liz Halliday (United Kingdom) Darren Turner	Aston Martin DBR9	MI	331
11	GT1	63	(United Kingdom) Team Modena	(Spain) Antonio Garcia (United States) Liz Halliday (United Kingdom) Darren Turner	Aston Martin 6.0L V12	MI	331
12	**GT2**	**62**	**(United States) Risi Competizione**	**(Finland) Mika Salo (United Kingdom) Johnny Mowlem (Brazil) Jaime Melo**	**Ferrari F430GT**	MI	**330**
12	**GT2**	**62**	**(United States) Risi Competizione**	**(Finland) Mika Salo (United Kingdom) Johnny Mowlem (Brazil) Jaime Melo**	**Ferrari 4.0L V8**	MI	**330**
13	GT2	45	(United States) Flying Lizard Motorsports	(United States) Johannes van Overbeek (Germany) Jörg Bergmeister (Germany) Marc Lieb	Porsche 997 GT3-RSR	MI	330
13	GT2	45	(United States) Flying Lizard Motorsports	(United States) Johannes van Overbeek (Germany) Jörg Bergmeister (Germany) Marc Lieb	Porsche 3.8L Flat-6	MI	330
14	LMP1	37	(United States) Intersport Racing (United Kingdom) Creation Autosportif	(United States) Clint Field (United States) Jon Field (United States) Richard Berry	Creation CA06/H	KU	325
14	LMP1	37	(United States) Intersport Racing (United Kingdom) Creation Autosportif	(United States) Clint Field (United States) Jon Field (United States) Richard Berry	Judd GV5 S2 5.0L V10	KU	325
15	GT2	71	(United States) Tafel Racing	(Germany) Wolf Henzler (United Kingdom) Robin Liddell (United States) Patrick Long	Porsche 997 GT3-RSR	MI	322
15	GT2	71	(United States) Tafel Racing	(Germany) Wolf Henzler (United Kingdom) Robin Liddell (United States) Patrick Long	Porsche 3.8L Flat-6	MI	322
16	GT2	85	(United States) Farnbacher-Loles Motorsports	(Germany) Pierre Ehret (Denmark) Lars-Erik Nielsen (Germany) Dirk Werner	Porsche 997 GT3-RSR	Y	316
16	GT2	85	(United States) Farnbacher-Loles Motorsports	(Germany) Pierre Ehret (Denmark) Lars-Erik Nielsen (Germany) Dirk Werner	Porsche 3.8L Flat-6	Y	316
17	GT2	73	(United States) Tafel Racing	(United States) Jim Tafel (Germany) Dominik Farnbacher (United States) Ian James	Porsche 997 GT3-RSR	MI	314
17	GT2	73	(United States) Tafel Racing	(United States) Jim Tafel (Germany) Dominik Farnbacher (United States) Ian James	Porsche 3.8L Flat-6	MI	314
18	GT2	18	(United States) Rahal Letterman Racing	(Germany) Ralf Kelleners (United States) Tom Milner Jr. (United States) Graham Rahal	Porsche 997 GT3-RSR	MI	313
18	GT2	18	(United States) Rahal Letterman Racing	(Germany) Ralf Kelleners (United States) Tom Milner Jr. (United States) Graham Rahal	Porsche 3.8L Flat-6	MI	313
19 DNF	LMP2	27	(Switzerland) Horag Racing	(Switzerland) Fredy Lienhard (Belgium) Didier Theys (Belgium) Eric van de Poele	Lola B05/40	MI	307
19 DNF	LMP2	27	(Switzerland) Horag Racing	(Switzerland) Fredy Lienhard (Belgium) Didier Theys (Belgium) Eric van de Poele	Judd XV675 3.4L V8	MI	307
20	GT2	24	(Monaco) JMB Racing	(United Kingdom) Ben Aucott (United Kingdom) Joe Macari (New Zealand) Rob Wilson	Ferrari F430GT	MI	305
20	GT2	24	(Monaco) JMB Racing	(United Kingdom) Ben Aucott (United Kingdom) Joe Macari (New Zealand) Rob Wilson	Ferrari 4.0L V8	MI	305
21 DNF	LMP1	12	(United States) Autocon Motorsports	(United States) Michael Lewis (United States) Chris McMurry (United States) Brian Willman	MG-Lola EX257	D	303
21 DNF	LMP1	12	(United States) Autocon Motorsports	(United States) Michael Lewis (United States) Chris McMurry (United States) Brian Willman	AER P07 2.0L Turbo I4	D	303
22	GT2	31	(United States) Petersen Motorsport (United States) White Lightning Racing	(Germany) Tim Bergmeister (Czech Republic) Tomáš Enge (Mexico) Memo Gidley	Ferrari F430GT	MI	300
22	GT2	31	(United States) Petersen Motorsport (United States) White Lightning Racing	(Germany) Tim Bergmeister (Czech Republic) Tomáš Enge (Mexico) Memo Gidley	Ferrari 4.0L V8	MI	300
23	LMP2	6	(United States) Penske Racing	(Germany) Sascha Maassen (Australia) Ryan Briscoe (France) Emmanuel Collard	Porsche RS Spyder Evo	MI	297
23	LMP2	6	(United States) Penske Racing	(Germany) Sascha Maassen (Australia) Ryan Briscoe (France) Emmanuel Collard	Porsche MR6 3.4L V8	MI	297
24	GT2	61	(United States) Risi Competizione (United States) Krohn Racing	(United States) Tracy Krohn (Sweden) Niclas Jönsson (United States) Colin Braun	Ferrari F430GT	MI	290
24	GT2	61	(United States) Risi Competizione (United States) Krohn Racing	(United States) Tracy Krohn (Sweden) Niclas Jönsson (United States) Colin Braun	Ferrari 4.0L V8	MI	290
25	GT2	86	(Netherlands) Spyker Squadron	(Netherlands) Peter Kox (Czech Republic) Jaroslav Janiš	Spyker C8 Spyder GT2-R	MI	286
25	GT2	86	(Netherlands) Spyker Squadron	(Netherlands) Peter Kox (Czech Republic) Jaroslav Janiš	Audi 3.8L V8	MI	286
26 DNF	GT2	21	(United States) Panoz Team PTG	(United States) Bill Auberlen (United States) Joey Hand (United Kingdom) Tom Kimber-Smith	Panoz Esperante GT-LM	Y	275
26 DNF	GT2	21	(United States) Panoz Team PTG	(United States) Bill Auberlen (United States) Joey Hand (United Kingdom) Tom Kimber-Smith	Ford (Élan) 5.0L V8	Y	275
27 NC	GT2	22	(United States) Panoz Team PTG	(Canada) Scott Maxwell (United States) Ross Smith (United States) Bryan Sellers	Panoz Esperante GT-LM	Y	270
27 NC	GT2	22	(United States) Panoz Team PTG	(Canada) Scott Maxwell (United States) Ross Smith (United States) Bryan Sellers	Ford (Élan) 5.0L V8	Y	270
28 NC	GT2	44	(United States) Flying Lizard Motorsports	(United States) Seth Neiman (United States) Darren Law (United States) Lonnie Pechnik	Porsche 997 GT3-RSR	MI	268
28 NC	GT2	44	(United States) Flying Lizard Motorsports	(United States) Seth Neiman (United States) Darren Law (United States) Lonnie Pechnik	Porsche 3.8L Flat-6	MI	268
29 DNF	GT2	10	(Germany) Konrad Motorsport	(United States) Philip Collin (Italy) "Luciano de Silva" (Brazil) Antonio Hermann	Porsche 911 GT3-RSR	Y	252
29 DNF	GT2	10	(Germany) Konrad Motorsport	(United States) Philip Collin (Italy) "Luciano de Silva" (Brazil) Antonio Hermann	Porsche 3.6L Flat-6	Y	252
30 DNF	GT2	54	(United States) Team Trans Sport Racing	(United States) Terry Borcheller (United States) Tim Pappas (Germany) Marc Basseng	Porsche 997 GT3-RSR	Y	235
30 DNF	GT2	54	(United States) Team Trans Sport Racing	(United States) Terry Borcheller (United States) Tim Pappas (Germany) Marc Basseng	Porsche 3.8L Flat-6	Y	235
31 NC	LMP2	8	(United States) B-K Motorsports (Japan) Mazdaspeed	(United States) Jamie Bach (United Kingdom) Ben Devlin (Brazil) Raphael Matos	Lola B07/46	KU	224
31 NC	LMP2	8	(United States) B-K Motorsports (Japan) Mazdaspeed	(United States) Jamie Bach (United Kingdom) Ben Devlin (Brazil) Raphael Matos	Mazda MZR-R 2.0L Turbo I4	KU	224
32 DNF	GT2	32	(United States) Corsa Motorsport (United States) White Lightning Racing	(Portugal) Rui Águas (Italy) Maurizio Mediani (Argentina) José María López	Ferrari F430GT	MI	206
32 DNF	GT2	32	(United States) Corsa Motorsport (United States) White Lightning Racing	(Portugal) Rui Águas (Italy) Maurizio Mediani (Argentina) José María López	Ferrari 4.0L V8	MI	206
33 DNF	GT2	77	(Slovakia) Autoracing Club Bratislava	(Slovakia) Miro Konôpka (Italy) Mauro Casadei (United Kingdom) Bo McCormick	Porsche 911 GT3-RS	D	129
33 DNF	GT2	77	(Slovakia) Autoracing Club Bratislava	(Slovakia) Miro Konôpka (Italy) Mauro Casadei (United Kingdom) Bo McCormick	Porsche 3.6L Flat-6	D	129
34 DNF	GT2	53	(United States) Robertson Racing	(United States) David Robertson (United States) Andrea Robertson (Netherlands) Arie Luyendyk Jr.	Panoz Esperante GT-LM	D	64
34 DNF	GT2	53	(United States) Robertson Racing	(United States) David Robertson (United States) Andrea Robertson (Netherlands) Arie Luyendyk Jr.	Ford (Élan) 5.0L V8	D	64

== Statistics ==
- Pole Position - #2 Audi Sport North America - 1:44.974
- Fastest Lap - #1 Audi Sport North America - 1:46.634

American Le Mans Series
Previous race: None	2007 season	Next race: 2007 Sports Car Challenge of St. Petersburg
