= Muscle Milk Pickett Racing =

American racecar team

(United States) Muscle Milk Pickett Racing
- Founded: 2007
- Folded: 2014
- Team principal(s): Greg Pickett; Brandon Fry
- Former series: United SportsCar Championship, American Le Mans Series, IMSA GT3 Cup Challenge
- Teams' Championships: 2 (2012, 2013)
- Drivers' Championships: 2 (2012, 2013)

Muscle Milk Pickett Racing (formerly known as Muscle Milk Motorsports and Muscle Milk Team Cytosport) was a motorsports group from Indianapolis, Indiana. The team was founded in 2007 by CytoSport co-founder and former IMSA GT Championship driver Greg Pickett. Since 2007, Pickett's team has competed in the United SportsCar Championship, the American Le Mans Series, the 24 Hours of Le Mans and the IMSA GT3 Cup Challenge. The team officially closed in 2014.

== American Le Mans Series ==
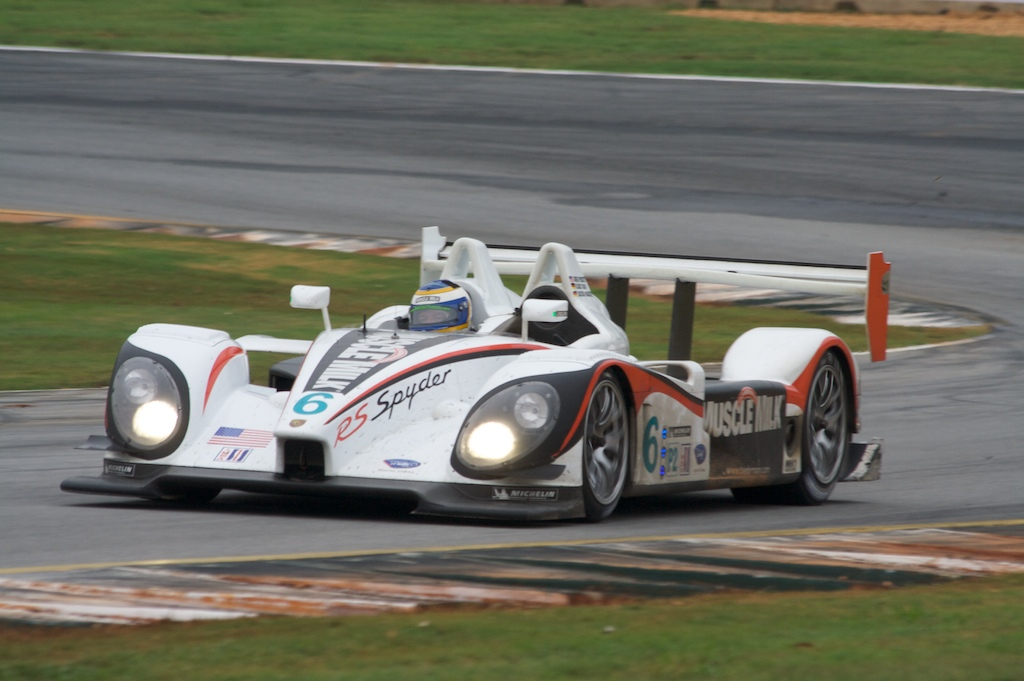
Muscle Milk Team Cytosport Porsche RS Spyder at the 2009 Petit Le Mans.

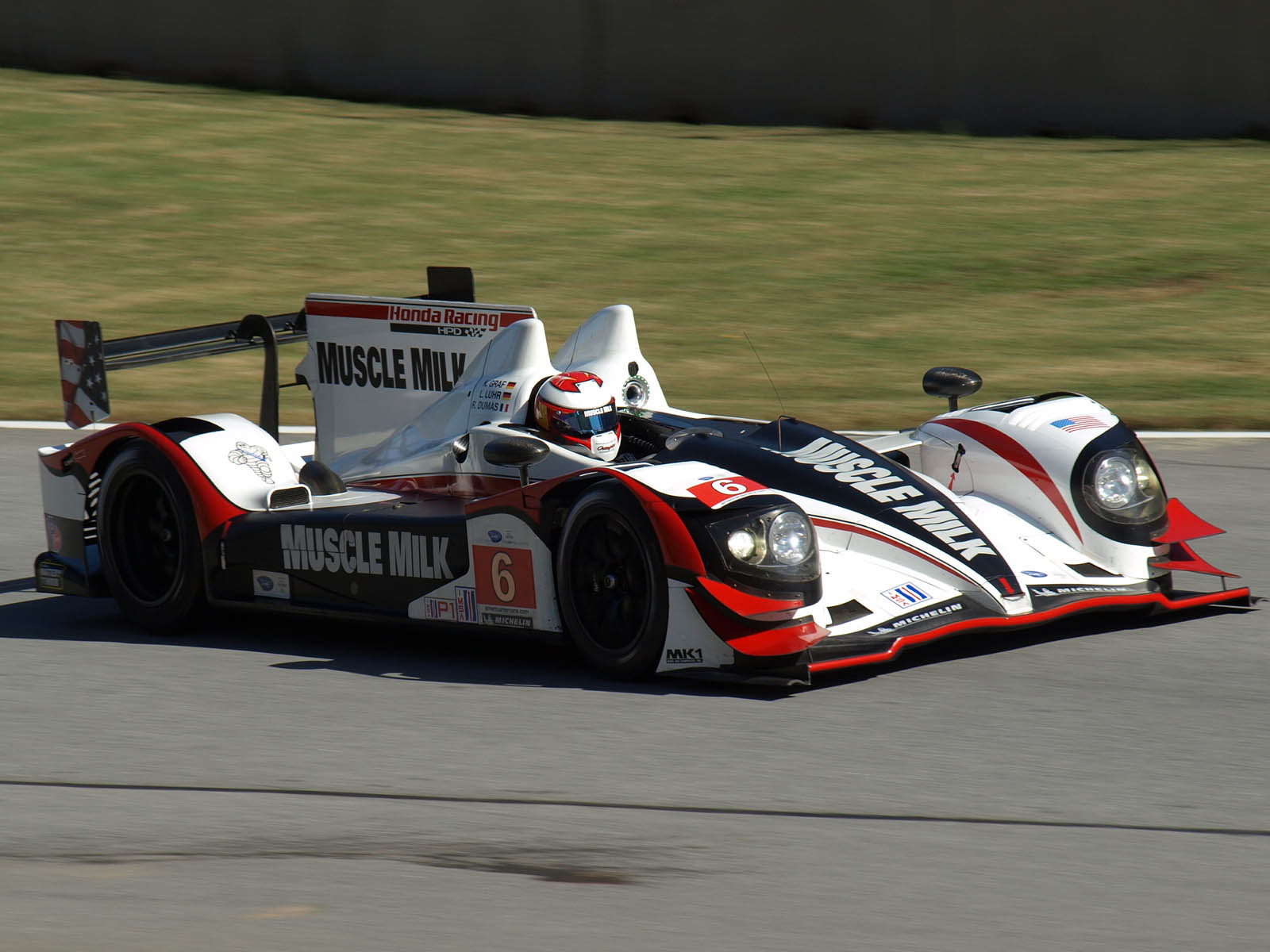
Muscle Milk Pickett Racings HPD ARX-03a at the 2012 Petit Le Mans.

In 2007, the Pickett bought an ex-Dyson Racing Lola B06/10 and teamed with former NASCAR and Trans-Am driver Klaus Graf. The team was scheduled debut in the third round of the ALMS season at the Grand Prix of Long Beach but the car did not start the race. The team went on to claim third place finishes in class at Mid Ohio, Road America and Petit Le Mans with Memo Gidley. By season's end they finished fourth in the LMP1 championship.

The 2009 season saw the team return to the American Le Mans Series with an LMP2 Porsche RS Spyder, also formerly run by Dyson Racing. Pickett and Graf debuted the car in the 6th round of the season at Mid Ohio where they finished 4th overall and 2nd in class. At Petit Le Mans they were joined by Porsche factory driver Sascha Maassen. After 184 laps the race was red flagged due to heavy rain with the team finishing 22nd overall and third in class. The team claimed 4 pole positions in the last four races and Klaus Graf finished fifth in the LMP2 Drivers' Championship. Having not driven in the rain shortened Petit Le Mans, Greg Pickett finished eighth in the Drivers' Championship.

2010 was the team's first full season and both LMP1 and LMP2 classes combined to make one class for all ALMS races. Pickett and Graf were once again joined by Maassen at Sebring and Petit Le Mans where the LMP1 and LMP2 classes split again to accommodate the Intercontinental Le Mans Cup. The team took LMP2 victory at the 12 Hours of Sebring, finishing fourth overall, followed by two overall victories at Lime Rock and Mosport. Muscle Milk Team Cytosport finished second in the LMP class just 20 points behind Patrón Highcroft Racing and Graf finished second in the Drivers' Championship.

The 2011 season saw the two LMP classes split again to LMP1 and LMP2. Cost capping regulations enforced by the ACO made the RS Spyder too expensive to run in the LMP2 class. The team took this opportunity and bought a Lola-Aston Martin B08/62 and returned to the LMP1 class. Lucas Luhr joined the team for the full season with Pickett only entering in the longer races of Sebring and Petit Le Mans. Unfortunately, there was not much competition during the start of the season with Dyson Racing Team being the only other full-time LMP1 entry, who later entered a second car. This was followed by Autocon Motorsports who returned with their updated Lola B06/10. Despite winning four events over the course of the season, Muscle Milk Aston Martin Racing's retirement at the season opening 12 Hours of Sebring with a mechanical failure left the team with a points deficit. At season's end they would finish second in the Teams' and Drivers' Championship with the Dyson team taking the title.

2012 saw Muscle Milk Pickett Racing campaign Honda's latest LMP1 car, the HPD ARX-03a, for the full season. Klaus Graf and Lucas Luhr continued as primary drivers. The team also expanded to the LMPC ranks with an Oreca FLM09 piloted by Mike Guasch and Memo Gidley. The team ran the LMPC car for three races before withdrawing after the Laguna Seca round after reconsideration from the team. The #6 HPD car, after some bad luck with a fueling hose at Sebring, went on to win the next five races in a row and another win at Virginia International Raceway. At the season's final race, Petit Le Mans, Lucas Luhr was hit by a GTC class Porsche. Despite repairs needed during the race, the team was able to complete 70% of the race in order to win points. The team won both the LMP1 Drivers' and Teams' Championships with just 5 points over their main rivals, Dyson Racing.

For 2013, the team continued competition with their HPD ARX-03a for the first three rounds before moving to the updated -03c for the remainder of the season. For the first three races, the team faced serious competition from the Swiss Rebellion Racing team. After losing out at the season opening 12 Hours of Sebring the team claimed the next two races at Long Beach and Laguna Seca. With Rebellion Racing withdrawing their full season entry to focus on 2014 plans, the Muscle Milk team won the next six races over the Dyson Racing squad and claimed the Teams' and Drivers' Championships. Rebellion Racing returned for Petit Le Mans, the final race of the American Le Mans Series before it would merge with the Rolex Sports Car Series to form the new United SportsCar Championship. A rain filled race saw the team lead overall until an overheating issue took the team's HPD out of the race.

== United SportsCar Championship ==
While team owner and principle, Greg Pickett, was originally working with Nissan to field a factory Nissan GTR GT3 program in the newly formed Tudor United SportsCar Championship GT Daytona class, plans never come to fruition, forcing the team to continue with a privateer program for 2014. The team received shipment of a new Nissan powered Oreca 03 days before the Roar Before the 24 winter test. Driver's Klaus Graf and Lucas Luhr were joined by Alex Brundle for the season opening 24 Hours of Daytona and Jann Mardenborough for the 12 Hours of Sebring. The IMSA's balance of performance left the LMP2 teams with a substantial gap in top speed to the much higher powered Daytona Prototypes and although the LMP2 cars were much more competitive at Sebring, the team was plagued by a power steering issue that gave them a 5th-place finish at Daytona and a retirement at Sebring. The team originally decided to sit out the following two rounds of the championship to develop their Oreca chassis, but soon decided to withdraw from the championship in question of the series' officiating and the team's competitive future against the Daytona Prototypes. On May 16, 2014 it was announced that Muscle Milk Pickett Racing had closed its doors and would not return to competition.

== 24 Hours of Le Mans ==
2008 was a quiet year for the team. They did not compete in the American Le Mans Series because the team wanted to focus on the competing in the 24 Hours of Le Mans. The team competed alongside Czech team Charouz Racing System. Pickett and Graf competed alongside sportscar racing veteran and 1988 24 Hours of Le Mans winner, Jan Lammers in the team's Lola B07/17. The team qualified the #12 LMP1 car 12th on the grid. The trio completed 146 laps before the 5.5 Liter Judd V10 failed and they had to retire.

With a move to LMP2 for the newly formed Tudor United SportsCar Championship prototype class, Muscle Milk Pickett Racing was invited to compete at the 2014 24 Hours of Le Mans. However, using the 2014 season as a development year for the team's new Nissan powered Oreca 03, team owner Greg Pickett decided to turn down the offer. The team had cited a possible return in 2015. However, the team officially closed operations soon after.

== Drivers ==
(Germany) Klaus Graf (2007–14) ALMS, TUSC
(Germany) Lucas Luhr (2011–14) ALMS, TUSC
(United Kingdom) Jann Mardenborough (2014) Sebring
(United Kingdom) Alex Brundle (2014) Daytona
(United States) Greg Pickett (2007–2011) ALMS
(France) Simon Pagenaud (2012) Sebring
(France) Romain Dumas (2012, 2013) Petit Le Mans, (2012) Sebring
(Germany) Mark Bullitt (2011) IMSA GT3
(Mexico) Memo Gidley (2007, 2010, 2012) ALMS
(Germany) Sascha Maassen (2009–10) ALMS
(Netherlands) Jan Lammers (2008) Le Mans
