= Marcel Fässler (racing driver) =

Swiss racing driver (born 1976)

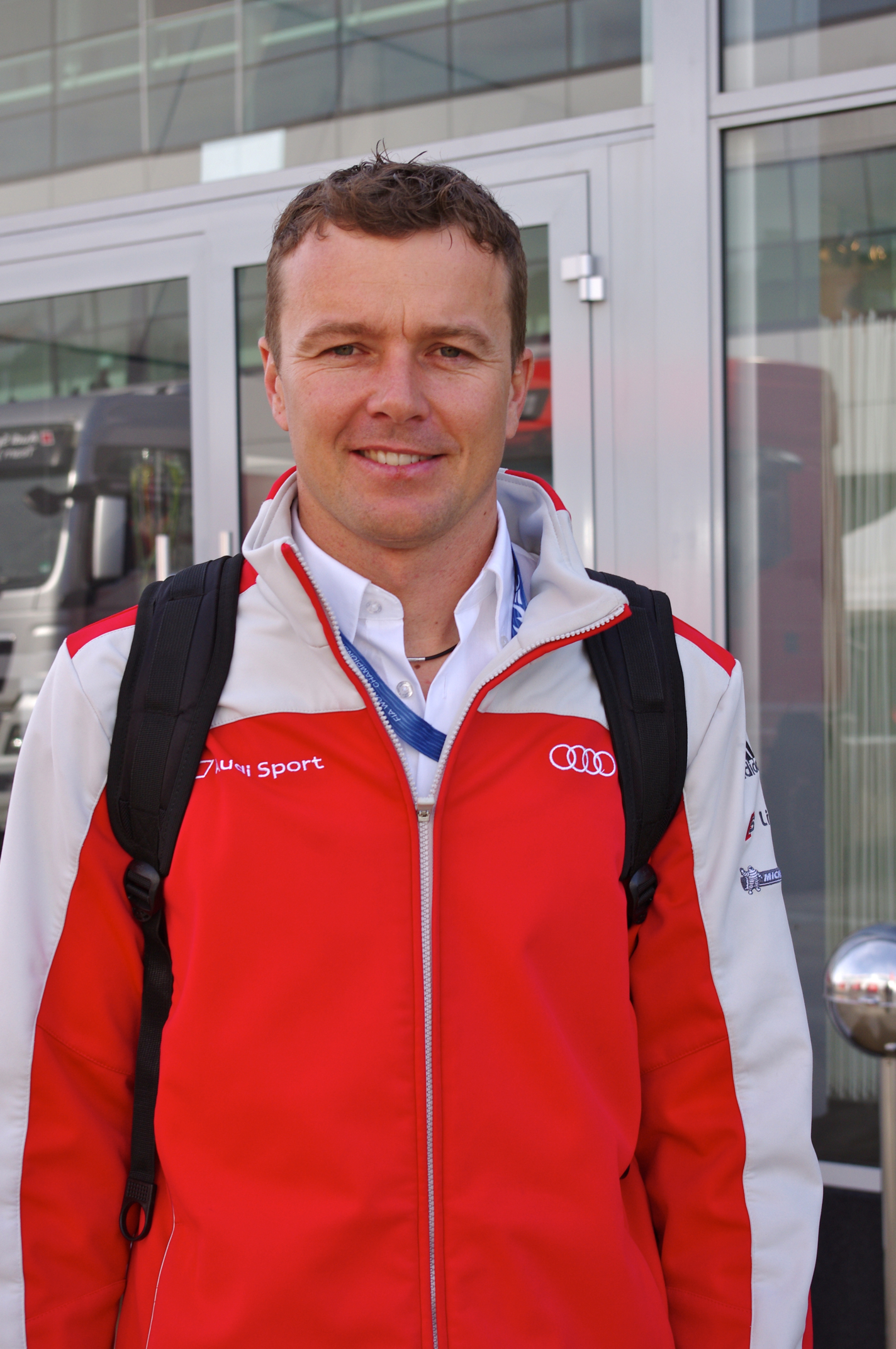
- Fässler in 2013
- Nationality: (Switzerland) Swiss
- Born: 27 May 1976 (age 50) Einsiedeln, Switzerland

FIA World Endurance Championship
- Categorisation: FIA Platinum
- Years active: 2012–2016
- Former teams: Audi Sport Team Joest
- Starts: 41
- Championships: 1 (2012)
- Wins: 10
- Podiums: 24
- Poles: 7

DTM
- Years active: 2000–2005
- Former teams: HWA Team; Phoenix Racing; Team Holzer
- Starts: 87
- Wins: 5
- Podiums: 19
- Poles: 6
- Fastest laps: 4
- Best finish: 3rd in 2003
24 Hours of Le Mans career
- Years: 2006–2019
- Teams: Swiss Spirit; Team Oreca-Matmut; Corvette Racing; Audi Sport Team Joest
- Best finish: 1st (2011, 2012, 2014)
- Class wins: 3 (2011, 2012, 2014)

Marcel Fässler (born 27 May 1976) is a Swiss former racing driver. From 2010 to 2016, he competed in the FIA World Endurance Championship as part of Audi Sport Team Joest with co-drivers André Lotterer and Benoît Tréluyer, winning the 24 Hours of Le Mans three times (2011, 2012, and 2014) and capturing the World Endurance Drivers' Championship in 2012.

== Professional career ==
=== Touring car racing ===
Born in Einsiedeln, Fässler began competing in the Deutsche Tourenwagen Masters for Mercedes-Benz when it resumed in 2000. He finished fourth with no wins in 2000, fourth with one win in 2001 and in 2002 and third with one win in 2003, all four seasons with a Mercedes-Benz CLK. He moved to Opel and an Opel Vectra GTS V8 for 2004 and 2005, where he finished ninth and 12th with no wins after which the brand retired from the DTM.

Fässler also drove the Formula One Mercedes-Benz safety car for one event in Canada, while regular driver Bernd Mayländer was off due to an injury. He was on track for three laps after a crash involving Williams' Juan Pablo Montoya and Ferrari's Rubens Barrichello. He also worked as a successor in Monaco.

=== Sports car racing ===
Fässler switched to sports cars in 2006, finishing second at the Spa 24 Hours in a Phoenix Aston Martin DBR9 and collecting two overall podiums at the Le Mans Series for Swiss Spirit. In 2007, he returned to open-wheel racing for A1 Team Switzerland in the sixth round of the A1 Grand Prix series held in Taupō, New Zealand, and in the ninth round at the Autódromo Hermanos Rodríguez, Mexico. He also won the Spa 24 Hours on a Chevrolet Corvette C6.R for Phoenix Carsport.

For 2008, Fässler joined the team for the full FIA GT Championship season. Sharing a GT1 class Corvette with Jean-Denis Delétraz, he won two races, finished seventh in the standings and helped the team finish second at the teams championship. The same year, he finished second at the American Le Mans Series Road America race on a works Audi R10 TDI for Audi Sport North America. LMP1 team Sebah hired Fässler for the 2009 Le Mans Series season, having a second-place finish as best result. In addition, he and Joël Camathias were crowned International GT Open overall and Super GT class champions in a Trottet-fielded Ferrari F430. He also retired at the 24 Hours of Le Mans driving a works GT1 class Corvette and finished fourth in the GT2 class of the petit Le Mans, also for Corvette Racing.

Audi works team Joest hired Fässler to drive the Audi R15 TDI plus at three 2010 races: Spa (12th), Le Mans (second) and Petit Le Mans (sixth). He also retired at the 24 Hours of Spa running a Phoenix Audi R8 LMS. In 2016, Fässler re-joined Corvette Racing for the Rolex 24 Hours of Daytona and won the GTLM Class in the No. 4 Chevrolet Corvette C7.R with regular season drivers Oliver Gavin and Tommy Milner by the smallest ever margin of victory 0.034 seconds.

== Racing record ==
=== Complete Deutsche Tourenwagen Masters results ===
(key) (Races in bold indicate pole position) (Races in italics indicate fastest lap)

Year	Team	Car	1	2	3	4	5	6	7	8	9	10	11	12	13	14	15	16	17	18	19	20	DC	Points
2000	HWA Team	AMG-Mercedes CLK-DTM	HOC; 1; 2	HOC; 2; 2	OSC; 1; 9	OSC; 2; 3	NOR; 1; 13	NOR; 2; 7	SAC; 1; 10	SAC; 2; 4	NÜR; 1; 3	NÜR; 2; 3	LAU; 1 C	LAU; 2 C	OSC; 1 NC	OSC; 2; 12	NÜR; 1; 4	NÜR; 2; 2	HOC; 1; 5	HOC; 2 Ret			4th	116
2001	HWA Team	AMG-Mercedes CLK-DTM	HOC; QR; 7	HOC; CR; 2	NÜR; QR; 8	NÜR; CR; 5	**OSC**; **QR**; 1	**OSC**; **CR**; 1	SAC; QR; 6	SAC; CR; 9	NOR; QR; 4	NOR; CR; Ret	LAU; QR; 2	LAU; CR; 8	NÜR; QR; 7	NÜR; CR; Ret	A1R; QR; 7	A1R; CR; 6	ZAN; QR; 6	ZAN; CR; 5	HOC; QR; Ret	HOC; CR; 5	4th	76
2002	HWA Team	AMG-Mercedes CLK-DTM	HOC; QR; 6	HOC; CR; Ret	ZOL; QR; 10	ZOL; CR; 9	DON; QR; 4	DON; CR; 6	SAC; QR; 9	SAC; CR; 4	NOR; QR; Ret	NOR; CR; DNS	LAU; QR; 6	LAU; CR; 3	NÜR; QR; 4	NÜR; CR; 4	A1R; QR; 10	A1R; CR; 1	ZAN; QR; 1	**ZAN**; **CR**; 3	HOC; QR; Ret	HOC; CR; 5	4th	30
2003	HWA Team	AMG-Mercedes CLK 2003	HOC; 2	**ADR**; 4	**NÜR**; 2	LAU; 10	NOR; 2	DON; 4	NÜR; 5	**A1R**; 1	ZAN; 6	HOC; 3											**3rd**	**57**
2004	OPC Team Phoenix	Opel Vectra GTS V8 2004	HOC; Ret	EST; 20†	ADR; Ret	LAU; 7	NOR; Ret	SHA^{1} 14†	NÜR; 4	OSC; 8	ZAN; 10	BRN; 4	HOC; Ret										9th	13
2005	OPC Team Holzer	Opel Vectra GTS V8 2005	HOC; 9	LAU; 13	SPA; 5	BRN; 15	OSC; 8	NOR; Ret	NÜR; 13	ZAN; 5	LAU; Ret	IST; 10	HOC; 6										12th	12
Sources:

- † — Retired, but was classified as he completed 90% of the winner's race distance.

^{1} - Shanghai was a non-championship round.

=== Complete 24 Hours of Le Mans results ===
Year	Team	Co-Drivers	Car	Class	Laps	Pos.	Class Pos.
2006	(Switzerland) Swiss Spirit	(Switzerland) Harold Primat (Austria) Philipp Peter	Courage LC70-Judd	LMP1	132	DNF	DNF
2007	(Switzerland) Swiss Spirit	(Switzerland) Jean-Denis Délétraz (Switzerland) Iradj Alexander	Lola B07/18-Audi	LMP1	62	DNF	DNF
2008	(France) Team Oreca-Matmut	(France) Olivier Panis (France) Simon Pagenaud	Courage-Oreca LC70-Judd	LMP1	147	DNF	DNF
2009	(United States) Corvette Racing	(United Kingdom) Oliver Gavin (Monaco) Olivier Beretta	Chevrolet Corvette C6.R	GT1	311	DNF	DNF
2010	(Germany) Audi Sport Team Joest	(Germany) André Lotterer (France) Benoît Tréluyer	Audi R15 TDI plus	LMP1	396	**2nd**	**2nd**
2011	(Germany) Audi Sport Team Joest	(Germany) André Lotterer (France) Benoît Tréluyer	Audi R18 TDI	LMP1	355	**1st**	**1st**
2012	(Germany) Audi Sport Team Joest	(Germany) André Lotterer (France) Benoît Tréluyer	Audi R18 e-tron quattro	LMP1	378	**1st**	**1st**
2013	(Germany) Audi Sport Team Joest	(Germany) André Lotterer (France) Benoît Tréluyer	Audi R18 e-tron quattro	LMP1	338	5th	5th
2014	(Germany) Audi Sport Team Joest	(Germany) André Lotterer (France) Benoît Tréluyer	Audi R18 e-tron quattro	LMP1-H	379	**1st**	**1st**
2015	(Germany) Audi Sport Team Joest	(Germany) André Lotterer (France) Benoît Tréluyer	Audi R18 e-tron quattro	LMP1	393	**3rd**	**3rd**
2016	(Germany) Audi Sport Team Joest	(Germany) André Lotterer (France) Benoît Tréluyer	Audi R18	LMP1	367	4th	4th
2017	(United States) Corvette Racing - GM	(United States) Tommy Milner (United Kingdom) Oliver Gavin	Chevrolet Corvette C7.R	GTE; Pro	335	24th	8th
2018	(United States) Corvette Racing - GM	(United States) Tommy Milner (United Kingdom) Oliver Gavin	Chevrolet Corvette C7.R	GTE; Pro	259	DNF	DNF
2019	(United States) Corvette Racing	(United States) Tommy Milner (United Kingdom) Oliver Gavin	Chevrolet Corvette C7.R	GTE; Pro	82	DNF	DNF

=== Britcar 24 Hour results ===
Year	Team	Co-Drivers	Car	Car No.	Class	Laps	Pos.	Class Pos.	Ref
2007	(Austria) Duller Motorsport	(Italy) Luca Cappellari (Switzerland) Gabriele Gardel (Italy) Fabrizio Gollin	BMW M3 E46 GTR	32	GTC	562	4th	**2nd**	

=== Complete American Le Mans Series results ===
Year	Entrant	Class	Chassis	Engine	1	2	3	4	5	6	7	8	9	10	11	Rank	Points	Ref
2008	Audi Sport North America	LMP1	Audi R10 TDI	Audi 5.5L Turbo V12 (Diesel)	SEB	STP	LNB	UTA	LIM	MID	AME ovr:2 cls:2	MOS	DET ovr:DSQ cls:DSQ	PET	MON	19th	21	
2009	Corvette Racing	GT1	Chevrolet Corvette C6.R	Chevrolet LS7.R 7.0L V8 (E85 ethanol)	SEB ovr:7 cls:2	STP	LNB	UTA	LIM	MID	AME	MOS				6th	26	
2009	Corvette Racing	GT2	Chevrolet Corvette C6.R	Chevrolet 6.0L V8									PET ovr:11 cls:4	MON		31st	20	
2010	Audi Sport Team Joest	LMP1	Audi R15 TDI plus	Audi 5.5L Turbo V10 (Diesel)	SEB	LNB	MON	UTA	LIM	MID	AME	MOS	PET ovr:6 cls:5			NC	-	
2011	Audi Sport Team Joest	LMP1	Audi R18 TDI	Audi 3.7L Turbo V6 (Diesel)	SEB	LNB	LIM	MOS	MID	AME	BAL	MON	PET ovr:Ret cls:Ret			NC	-	
2013	Audi Sport Team Joest	P1	Audi R18 e-tron quattro	Audi 3.7L Turbo V6 (Diesel)	SEB ovr:1 cls:1	LNB	MON	LIM	MOS	AME	BAL	COTA	VIR	PET		NC	-	

=== Complete FIA World Endurance Championship results ===
Year	Entrant	Class	Chassis	Engine	1	2	3	4	5	6	7	8	9	Rank	Points
2012	Audi Sport Team Joest	LMP1	Audi R18 e-tron quattro	Audi TDI 3.7L Turbo V6 (Hybrid Diesel)	**SEB**; 11	SPA; 2	**LMS**; 1	**SIL**; 1	SÃO; 2	BHR; 1	FUJ; 2	SHA; 3		1st	172.5
2013	Audi Sport Team Joest	LMP1	Audi R18 e-tron quattro	Audi TDI 3.7L Turbo V6 (Hybrid Diesel)	SIL; 2	**SPA**; 1	LMS; 5	**SÃO**; 1	COA; 3	**FUJ**; 14	SHA; 1	BHR; 2		2nd	149.25
2014	Audi Sport Team Joest	LMP1	Audi R18 e-tron quattro	Audi TDI 4.0 L Turbo V6 (Hybrid Diesel)	SIL; Ret	SPA; 5	LMS; 1	COA; 1	FUJ; 6	SHA; 4	BHR; 4	SÃO; 5		2nd	127
2015	Audi Sport Team Joest	LMP1	Audi R18 e-tron quattro	Audi TDI 4.0 L Turbo V6 (Hybrid Diesel)	SIL; 1	SPA; 1	LMS; 3	NÜR; 3	COA; 2	FUJ; 3	SHA; 3	BHR; 2		2nd	161
2016	Audi Sport Team Joest	LMP1	Audi R18	Audi TDI 4.0 L Turbo Diesel V6 (Hybrid)	**SIL**; EX	SPA; 5	LMS; 4	**NÜR**; 3	MEX; 2	**COA**; 6	FUJ; Ret	SHA; 6	BHR; 2	5th	104

=== Complete WeatherTech SportsCar Championship results ===
(key) (Races in bold indicate pole position; races in italics indicate fastest lap)

Year	Entrant	Class	Make	Engine	1	2	3	4	5	6	7	8	9	10	11	Rank	Points	Ref
2016	Corvette Racing	GTLM	Chevrolet Corvette C7.R	Chevrolet 5.5 V8	DAY; 1	SEB; 1	LBH	LGA	WGL	MOS	LIM	ELK	VIR	COA	PET; 3	12th	103	
2017	Corvette Racing	GTLM	Chevrolet Corvette C7.R	Chevrolet LT 5.5 V8	DAY; 9	SEB; 10	LBH	COA	WGL	MOS	LIM	ELK	VIR	LGA	PET; 4	16th	71	
2018	Corvette Racing	GTLM	Chevrolet Corvette C7.R	Chevrolet LT5.5 5.5 V8	DAY; 4	SEB; 6	LBH	MOH	WGL	MOS	LIM	ELK	VIR	LGA	PET; 2	12th	85	
2019	Corvette Racing	GTLM	Chevrolet Corvette C7.R	Chevrolet LT 5.5 V8	DAY; 8	SEB; 8	LBH	MDO	WGL	MOS; 8	LIM; 6	ELK	VIR	LGA	PET; 7	13th	118	
2020	Corvette Racing	GTLM	Chevrolet Corvette C8.R	Chevrolet 5.5 L V8	DAY; 7	DAY	SEB	ELK	VIR	ATL	MDO	CLT	PET; 4	LGA	SEB; 6	10th	77	

=== Complete Blancpain GT Series Sprint Cup results ===
Year	Team	Car	Class	1	2	3	4	5	6	7	8	9	10	Pos.	Points
2017	Belgian Audi Club Team WRT	Audi R8 LMS	Pro	MIS; QR; 9	MIS; CR; Ret	BRH; QR; 18	BRH; CR; 5	ZOL; QR; 13	ZOL; CR; 4	**HUN**; **QR**; 1	HUN; CR; 1	**NÜR**; **QR**; 3	NÜR; CR; 10	5th	62

Sporting positions
Preceded by Andrea Montermini; Michele Maceratesi	International GT Open; Champion; 2009; With: Joël Camathias	Succeeded by Álvaro Barba; Pierre Kaffer
Preceded by Timo Bernhard; Romain Dumas; Mike Rockenfeller	Winner of the 24 Hours of Le Mans; 2011–2012; With: André Lotterer & Benoît Tréluyer	Succeeded by Allan McNish; Tom Kristensen; Loïc Duval
Preceded by Inaugural	FIA World Endurance Champion; 2012; With: André Lotterer & Benoît Tréluyer	Succeeded by Allan McNish; Tom Kristensen; Loïc Duval
Preceded by Allan McNish; Tom Kristensen; Loïc Duval	Winner of the 24 Hours of Le Mans; 2014; With: André Lotterer & Benoît Tréluyer	Succeeded by Earl Bamber; Nico Hülkenberg; Nick Tandy
Preceded by Bernd Mayländer	F1 Safety Car Driver; 2001 Canadian Grand Prix	Succeeded by Bernd Mayländer
