= Tommy Milner =

American racing driver (born 1986)

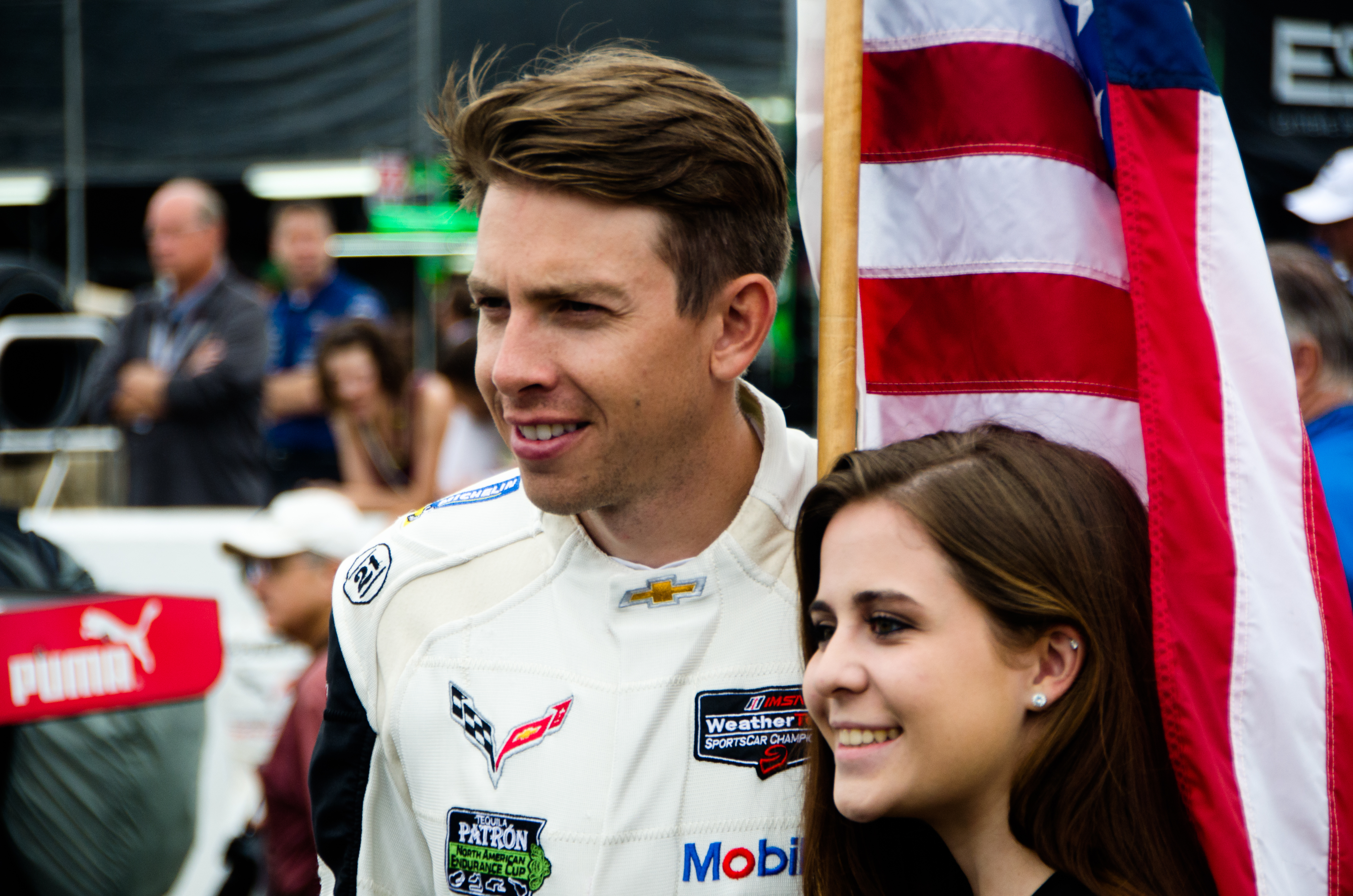
- Milner at the 2017 24 Hours of Daytona
- Nationality: (United States) American
- Born: Thomas Gerhard Milner Jr. January 28, 1986 (age 40) Washington, D.C., United States

IMSA SportsCar Championship career
- Debut season: 2014
- Current team: Corvette Racing by Pratt Miller Motorsports
- Categorisation: FIA Platinum
- Car number: 4
- Starts: 90
- Championships: 1 2016 (GTLM)
- Wins: 11
- Podiums: 30
- Best finish: 1st in 2016 (GTLM)

Previous series
- FIA World Endurance Championship; American Le Mans Series; Rolex Sports Car Series
24 Hours of Le Mans career
- Years: 2006-2007, 2011-2019, 2021-2022
- Teams: Multimatic Motorsports, Team LNT, Corvette Racing
- Best finish: 11th overall (2011)
- Class wins: 2 (2011, 2015)

Thomas Gerhard Milner Jr. (born January 28, 1986) is an American GM factory racing and test driver, also currently employed full-time in Corvette Racing. He is also the co-owner of PRIVATE LABEL Team Hype E-Sports team on iRacing. He was featured in 2011 racing video game Shift 2: Unleashed.

== Early life ==
Milner was born on 28 January 1986. His passion for racing started when he would watch and observe his father's racing team, currently known as PTG Racing Inc. Milner even states:

Always in the summertime, when I was off school I’d go up to the shop almost every day and I’d just kind of hang out at the shop there and interact with all the crew guys and ride around all the pit equipment around the parking lot and stuff like that. It was fun being there. The crew guys were fun to hang out with always and it was cool to be around the race team.

At a young age, Milner would test and consult amateur racing game mods, whom of which are now the founders of Slightly Mad Studios.

== Career ==
Milner started karting at the age of 14, and began his career as a sports car driver in the 2004 and 2005 Grand-Am seasons. He drove for Panoz in 2006 and 2008 and for Rahal Letterman Racing in 2007, 2009 and 2010 in the American Le Mans Series. In 2010, he finished third in the GT Driver's Championship. In 2011, he decided to make the switch to Corvette Racing. In addition to driving for Corvette Racing, he also drove for Team Need for Speed Schubert at the 2011 24 Hours of Nürburgring. He currently drives the Chevrolet Corvette C8.R with co-driver Jordan Taylor.

The highlight of Milner's career so far is a class victory at the 2011 24 Hours of Le Mans driving a Chevrolet Corvette C6.R with teammates Antonio García and Olivier Beretta. He also won his first American Le Mans Series race at the 2012 American Le Mans Series at Long Beach. In 2013, he took his first-class victory at the 12 Hours of Sebring. He also achieved a class victory at the 2022 6 Hours of Monza driving the Chevrolet Corvette C8.R with co-driver Nick Tandy.

== Personal life ==
Milner is currently married and has one daughter. He resides in Loudoun County, Virginia.

== Racing record ==
=== Career summary ===
Season	Series	Team	Races	Wins	Poles	F/Laps	Podiums	Points	Position
2004	Rolex Sports Car Series - GT	Prototype Technology Group, Inc.	3	1			1	79	19th
2005	Rolex Sports Car Series - GT	Prototype Technology Group, Inc.	13	3			7	323	6th
2006	American Le Mans Series - GT2	Multimatic Motorsports Team Panoz	10	0	0	0	0	53	14th
2006	Rolex Sports Car Series - GT	Sigalsport BMW	1	0	0	0	0	15	84th
2007	American Le Mans Series - GT2	Rahal Letterman Racing	12	0	0	0	5	107	6th
2008	American Le Mans Series - GT2	Panoz Team PTG	11	0	0	0	0	52	14th
2009	American Le Mans Series - GT2	BMW Rahal Letterman Racing	10	0	0	0	5	100	6th
2010	American Le Mans Series - GT2	BMW Rahal Letterman Racing	9	0	0	0	6	125	**3rd**
2011	American Le Mans Series - GT	Corvette Racing	9	0	0	0	1	58	9th
2011	Rolex Sports Car Series - GT	Autohaus Motorsports	1	0	0	0	1	32	43rd
2012	American Le Mans Series - GT	Corvette Racing	10	4			7	146	**1st**
2012	Rolex Sports Car Series - GT	Autohaus Motorsports	1	0	0	0	0	22	63rd
2013	American Le Mans Series - GT	Corvette Racing	10	2			4	105	**3rd**
2013	Rolex Sports Car Series - GT	Stevenson Motorsports	1	0	0	0	0		
2014	United Sports Car Championship - GTLM	Corvette Racing	11	0	0	0	1	291	10th
2015	United Sports Car Championship - GTLM	Corvette Racing	10	0	0	0	2	261	8th
2016	IMSA SportsCar Championship - GTLM	Corvette Racing	11	4			6	345	**1st**
2017	IMSA SportsCar Championship - GTLM	Corvette Racing	11	1	0	0	1	276	8th
2018	IMSA SportsCar Championship - GTLM	Corvette Racing	11	1	0	0	4	310	**3rd**
2019	IMSA SportsCar Championship - GTLM	Corvette Racing	9	0	0	1	1	227	11th
2020	IMSA SportsCar Championship - GTLM	Corvette Racing	11	1	0	2	4	315	**3rd**
2021	IMSA SportsCar Championship - GTLM	Corvette Racing	11	4	1	0	8	3448	**2nd**
2022	FIA World Endurance Championship - LMGTE Pro	Corvette Racing	6	1	0	0	3	102	6th
2022	IMSA SportsCar Championship - GTD Pro	Corvette Racing	1	0	0	0	0	234	35th
2023	IMSA SportsCar Championship - GTD Pro	Corvette Racing	3	0	0	0	1	915	9th
2024	IMSA SportsCar Championship - GTD Pro	Corvette Racing by Pratt Miller Motorsports	10	0	3	1	2	2674	8th
2024	GT World Challenge America - Pro	DXDT Racing	9	8	6	4	8	230	**2nd**
2025	IMSA SportsCar Championship - GTD Pro	Corvette Racing by Pratt Miller Motorsports	10	0	0	0	3	2908	6th
2025	IMSA SportsCar Championship - GTD	DXDT Racing	1	0	0	0	0	183	80th
2026	IMSA SportsCar Championship - GTD Pro	Corvette Racing by Pratt Miller Motorsports	10	0	0	1	4	2949	**3rd**

=== Rolex Sports Car Series results ===
(key) (Races in bold indicate pole position) (Races in italics indicate fastest lap)

Year	Team	Class	Make	Engine	1	2	3	4	5	6	7	8	9	10	11	12	13	14	Pos.	Points	Ref
2004	Prototype Technology Group, Inc.	GT	BMW M3 E46	BMW 3.2 L I6	DAY	HOM	PHX	MTT	WAT	DAY	MOH	WGL	HOM	**VIR**; 10	BAR; 8	**CAL**; 1			19th	79	
2005	Prototype Technology Group, Inc.	GT	BMW M3 E46	BMW 3.2 L I6	DAY; 31	HOM; 18	CAL; 7	LAG; 1	MTT; 3	WAT; 3	DAY; 2	BAR; 7	WAT; 19	MOH; 1	PHX; 2	**WAT**; 10	VIR; 1	MEX	6th	323	
2006	Sigalsport BMW	GT	BMW M3 E46	BMW 3.2 L I6	DAY; 16	MEX	HOM	VIR	LGA	PHX	LIM	WGL	MOH	DAY	BAR	SON	UTA		84th	15	
2011	Autohaus Motorsports	GT	Chevrolet Camaro GT.R	Chevrolet 6.0 L V8	DAY	HOM	BIR	VIR	LIM	**WAT**; 2	ELK	LAG	NJ	WGL	MON	MOH			43rd	32	
2012	Autohaus Motorsports	GT	Chevrolet Camaro GT.R	Chevrolet 6.0 L V8	DAY; 9	BAR	HOM	NJ	DET	MOH	ELK	WAT	IMS	WAT	MON	LAG	LRP		63rd	22	
2013	Stevenson Motorsports	GT	Chevrolet Camaro GT.R	Chevrolet 6.2 L V8	DAY; 23	COA	BAR	ATL	DET	MOH	WAT	IMS	ELK	KAN	LAG	LRP					

=== 24 Hours of Daytona results ===
Year	Team	Co-drivers	Car	Class	Laps	Pos.	Class Pos.
2005	(United States) Prototype Technology Group, Inc.	(United States) Justin Marks (United States) Kelly Collins (United States) R. J. Valentine	BMW M3 E46	GT	168	59th DNF	31st DNF
2006	(United States) Sigalsport BMW	(United States) Bill Auberlen (United States) Matthew Alhadeff (United States) Justin Marks (United States) Gene Sigal	BMW M3 E46	GT	592	31st	16th
2012	(United States) Autohaus Motorsports	(United States) Paul Edwards (Hong Kong) Matthew Marsh (United States) Jordan Taylor	Chevrolet Camaro GT.R	GT	713	20th	9th
2013	(United States) Stevenson Motorsports	(United States) John Edwards (United Kingdom) Robin Liddell (Denmark) Jan Magnussen	Chevrolet Camaro GT.R	GT	595	36th DNF	23rd DNF
2014	(United States) Corvette Racing	(United Kingdom) Oliver Gavin (United Kingdom) Robin Liddell	Chevrolet Corvette C7.R	GTLM	666	16th	5th
2015	(United States) Corvette Racing	(United Kingdom) Oliver Gavin (France) Simon Pagenaud	Chevrolet Corvette C7.R	GTLM	718	7th	**3rd**
2016	(United States) Corvette Racing	(Switzerland) Marcel Fässler (United Kingdom) Oliver Gavin	Chevrolet Corvette C7.R	GTLM	722	7th	**1st**
2017	(United States) Corvette Racing	(Switzerland) Marcel Fässler (United Kingdom) Oliver Gavin	Chevrolet Corvette C7.R	GTLM	636	16th	9th
2018	(United States) Corvette Racing	(Switzerland) Marcel Fässler (United Kingdom) Oliver Gavin	Chevrolet Corvette C7.R	GTLM	780	14th	4th
2019	(United States) Corvette Racing	(Switzerland) Marcel Fässler (United Kingdom) Oliver Gavin	Chevrolet Corvette C7.R	GTLM	555	28th	8th
2020	(United States) Corvette Racing	(Switzerland) Marcel Fässler (United Kingdom) Oliver Gavin	Chevrolet Corvette C8.R	GTLM	461	36th	7th
2021	(United States) Corvette Racing	(United Kingdom) Alexander Sims (United Kingdom) Nick Tandy	Chevrolet Corvette C8.R	GTLM	770	12th	**2nd**
2022	(United States) Corvette Racing	(Denmark) Marco Sørensen (United Kingdom) Nick Tandy	Chevrolet Corvette C8.R GTD	GTD Pro	626	45th	10th
2023	(United States) Corvette Racing	(Spain) Antonio García (United States) Jordan Taylor	Chevrolet Corvette C8.R GTD	GTD Pro	729	19th	**2nd**
2024	(United States) Corvette Racing by Pratt Miller Motorsports	(New Zealand) Earl Bamber (Netherlands) Nicky Catsburg	Chevrolet Corvette Z06 GT3.R	GTD Pro	715	37th	8th
2025	(United States) Corvette Racing by Pratt Miller Motorsports	(Netherlands) Nicky Catsburg (Argentina) Nicolás Varrone	Chevrolet Corvette Z06 GT3.R	GTD Pro	723	22nd	7th
2026	(United States) Corvette Racing by Pratt Miller Motorsports	(Netherlands) Nicky Catsburg (Argentina) Nicolás Varrone	Chevrolet Corvette Z06 GT3.R	GTD Pro	662	22nd	4th

=== American Le Mans Series results ===
(key) (Races in bold indicate pole position; results in italics indicate fastest lap)

Year	Team	Class	Make	Engine	1	2	3	4	5	6	7	8	9	10	11	12	Pos.	Points	Ref
2006	Multimatic Motorsports Team Panoz	GT2	Panoz Esperante GT-LM	Ford (Élan) 5.0L V8	SEB; DNF	TEX; DNF	MID; DNF	LIM; 7	UTA; 7	POR; 6	AME; 9	MOS; 4	PET; 4	MON; 5			14th	53	
2007	Rahal Letterman Racing	GT2	Porsche 911 GT3-RSR	Porsche 3.8L Flat-6	SEB; 6	STP; 8†	LNB; DNF	TEX; 8†	UTA; 6	LIM; 2	MID; 8	AME; 2	MOS; 3	DET; DNF	PET; 3	MON; 3	6th	107	
2008	Panoz Team PTG	GT2	Panoz Esperante GT-LM	Ford (Élan) 5.0L V8	SEB; DNF	STP; 6	LBH; DNF	UTA; 4	LRP; 5	MOH; 7	ELK; DNF	MOS; 5	DET; 10†	PET; 12	LAG; 4		14th	52	
2009	BMW Rahal Letterman Racing	GT2	BMW M3 GT2	BMW 4.0 L V8	SEB; DNF	STP; 2	LBH; 3	UTA; 7	LRP; 10	MOH; 3	ELK; 2	**MOS**; **DNF**	PET; 2	LAG; 6			6th	100	
2010	BMW Rahal Letterman Racing	GT	BMW M3 GT2	BMW 4.0 L V8	SEB; 2	LBH; 3	LAG; 8	UTA; 2	LRP; 2	MOH; 3	ELK; DNF	MOS; 3	PET; 4				3rd	125	
2011	Corvette Racing	GT	Chevrolet Corvette C6.R	Chevrolet 5.5 L V8	SEB; 3	LBH; 5	LRP; 9	MOS; 6	MOH; 6	ELK; DNF	BAL; 7	LAG; 7	PET; DNF				9th	58	
2012	Corvette Racing	GT	Chevrolet Corvette C6.R	Chevrolet 5.5 L V8	SEB; 3	LBH; 1	LAG; 1	LRP; 3	MOS; 10	MOH; 1	ELK; 4	**BAL**; **2**	VIR; 1	PET; 12			1st	146	
2013	Corvette Racing	GT	Chevrolet Corvette C6.R	Chevrolet 5.5 L V8	SEB; 1	LBH; 4	LAG; 9	LRP; 6	MOS; 1	ELK; 3	BAL; 2	COA; DNF	VIR; 6	PET; 10			3rd	105	

^{†} Did not finish the race but was classified as his car completed more than 70% of the overall winner's race distance.

=== Complete 24 Hours of Le Mans results ===
Year	Team	Co-Drivers	Car	Class	Laps	Pos.	Class Pos.
2006	(Canada) Multimatic Motorsport Team Panoz	(United States) Gunnar Jeannette (Canada) Scott Maxwell	Panoz Esperante GT-LM	GT2	34	DNF	DNF
2007	(United Kingdom) Team LNT	(United Kingdom) Tom Kimber-Smith (United Kingdom) Danny Watts	Panoz Esperante GT-LM	GT2	60	DNF	DNF
2011	(United States) Corvette Racing	(Monaco) Olivier Beretta (Spain) Antonio García	Chevrolet Corvette C6.R	GTE; Pro	314	11th	**1st**
2012	(United States) Corvette Racing	(United Kingdom) Oliver Gavin (United Kingdom) Richard Westbrook	Chevrolet Corvette C6.R	GTE; Pro	215	NC	NC
2013	(United States) Corvette Racing	(United Kingdom) Oliver Gavin (United Kingdom) Richard Westbrook	Chevrolet Corvette C6.R	GTE; Pro	309	22nd	7th
2014	(United States) Corvette Racing	(United Kingdom) Oliver Gavin (United Kingdom) Richard Westbrook	Chevrolet Corvette C7.R	GTE; Pro	333	20th	4th
2015	(United States) Corvette Racing-GM	(United Kingdom) Oliver Gavin (United States) Jordan Taylor	Chevrolet Corvette C7.R	GTE; Pro	337	17th	**1st**
2016	(United States) Corvette Racing - GM	(United Kingdom) Oliver Gavin (United States) Jordan Taylor	Chevrolet Corvette C7.R	GTE; Pro	219	DNF	DNF
2017	(United States) Corvette Racing - GM	(Switzerland) Marcel Fässler (United Kingdom) Oliver Gavin	Chevrolet Corvette C7.R	GTE; Pro	335	24th	8th
2018	(United States) Corvette Racing - GM	(Switzerland) Marcel Fässler (United Kingdom) Oliver Gavin	Chevrolet Corvette C7.R	GTE; Pro	259	DNF	DNF
2019	(United States) Corvette Racing	(Switzerland) Marcel Fässler (United Kingdom) Oliver Gavin	Chevrolet Corvette C7.R	GTE; Pro	82	DNF	DNF
2021	(United States) Corvette Racing	(United Kingdom) Alexander Sims (United Kingdom) Nick Tandy	Chevrolet Corvette C8.R	GTE; Pro	313	44th	6th
2022	(United States) Corvette Racing	(United Kingdom) Alexander Sims (United Kingdom) Nick Tandy	Chevrolet Corvette C8.R	GTE; Pro	260	DNF	DNF

=== Complete IMSA SportsCar Championship results ===
(key) (Races in bold indicate pole position) (Races in italics indicate fastest lap)

Year	Team	Class	Make	Engine	1	2	3	4	5	6	7	8	9	10	11	Pos.	Points	Ref
2014	Corvette Racing	GTLM	Chevrolet Corvette C7.R	Chevrolet LT5.5R 5.5 L V8	DAY; 5	SEB; 6	LBH; 3	LGA; 5	WGL; 4	MOS; 6	IMS; 5	ELK; 7	VIR; 9	COA; 10	PET; 4	10th	291	
2015	Corvette Racing	GTLM	Chevrolet Corvette C7.R	Chevrolet LT5.5R 5.5 L V8	**DAY**; 3	SEB; 9	LBH; 7	LGA; 6	WGL; 7	MOS; 5	ELK; 7	VIR; 8	COA; 8	PET; 3		8th	261	
2016	Corvette Racing	GTLM	Chevrolet Corvette C7.R	Chevrolet LT5.5R 5.5 L V8	DAY; 1	SEB; 1	LBH; 2	LGA; 7	WGL; 4	MOS; 2	LIM; 1	ELK; 1	VIR; 9	COA; 5	PET; 3	1st	345	
2017	Corvette Racing	GTLM	Chevrolet Corvette C7.R	Chevrolet LT5.5R 5.5 L V8	DAY; 9	SEB; 10	LBH; 1	COA; 7	WGL; 5	MOS; 8	LIM; 8	ELK; 5	VIR; 6	LGA; 9	PET; 4	8th	276	
2018	Corvette Racing	GTLM	Chevrolet Corvette C7.R	Chevrolet LT5.5R 5.5 L V8	DAY; 4	SEB; 6	LBH; 1	MOH; 8	WGL; 5	MOS; 3	LIM; 4	ELK; 2	VIR; 6	**LGA**; 5	PET; 2	3rd	310	
2019	Corvette Racing	GTLM	Chevrolet Corvette C7.R	Chevrolet LT5.5R 5.5 L V8	DAY; 8	SEB; 8	LBH; 3	MOH; 8	WGL; 8	MOS	LIM	**ELK**; 6	VIR; 4	LGA; 4	PET; 7	11th	227	
2020	Corvette Racing	GTLM	Chevrolet Corvette C8.R	Chevrolet LT6.R 5.5 L V8	DAY; 7	**DAY**; 5	SEB; 1	ELK; 2	VIR; 4	ATL; 2	MOH; 2	CLT; 4	PET; 4	LGA; 6	SEB; 6	3rd	315	
2021	Corvette Racing	GTLM	Chevrolet Corvette C8.R	Chevrolet LT6.R 5.5 L V8	**DAY**; 2	SEB; 5	**DET**; 1†	WGL; 4	WGL; 2	LIM; 2	ELK; 3	LGA; 1	LBH; 1	**VIR**; 1	PET; 4	2nd	3448	
2022	Corvette Racing	GTD Pro	Chevrolet Corvette C8.R GTD	Chevrolet LT6.R 5.5 L V8	DAY; 10	SEB	LBH	LGA	WGL	MOS	LIM	ELK	VIR	PET		35th	234	
2023	Corvette Racing	GTD Pro	Chevrolet Corvette C8.R GTD	Chevrolet LT6.R 5.5 L V8	DAY; 2	SEB; 5	LBH	MON	WGL	MOS	LIM	ELK	VIR	IMS	PET; 7	9th	915	
2024	Corvette Racing by Pratt Miller Motorsports	GTD Pro	Chevrolet Corvette Z06 GT3.R	Chevrolet LT6.R 5.5 L V8	DAY; 8	SEB; 11	**LGA**; 3	DET; 9	WGL; 7	MOS; 2	**ELK**; 6	VIR; 8	**IMS**; 11	PET; 12		8th	2674	
2025	Corvette Racing by Pratt Miller Motorsports	GTD Pro	Chevrolet Corvette Z06 GT3.R	Chevrolet LT6.R 5.5 L V8	DAY; 7	SEB; 9		LGA; 6	DET; 6	WGL; 4	MOS; 2	ELK; 10	VIR; 3	IMS; 6	PET; 2	6th	2908	
2025	DXDT Racing	GTD	Chevrolet Corvette Z06 GT3.R	Chevrolet LT6.R 5.5 L V8			LBH; 15									80th	183	
2026	Corvette Racing by Pratt Miller Motorsports	GTD Pro	Chevrolet Corvette Z06 GT3.R	Chevrolet LT6.R 5.5 L V8	DAY; 4	SEB; 3	LGA; 2	DET; 7	WGL; 8	MOS; 4	ELK; 3	VIR; 6	IMS; 2	PET; 12		3rd	2949	

^{*} Season still in progress.

=== Complete FIA World Endurance Championship results ===
(key) (Races in bold indicate pole position) (Races in italics indicate fastest lap)

Year	Entrant	Class	Chassis	Engine	1	2	3	4	5	6	Rank	Points
2022	Corvette Racing	LMGTE Pro	Chevrolet Corvette C8.R	Chevrolet 5.5 L V8	SEB; 2	SPA; 4	**LMS**; Ret	MNZ; 1	FUJ; 5	BHR; 2	6th	102
