= Chevrolet Corvette C8.R =

Grand tourer racing car

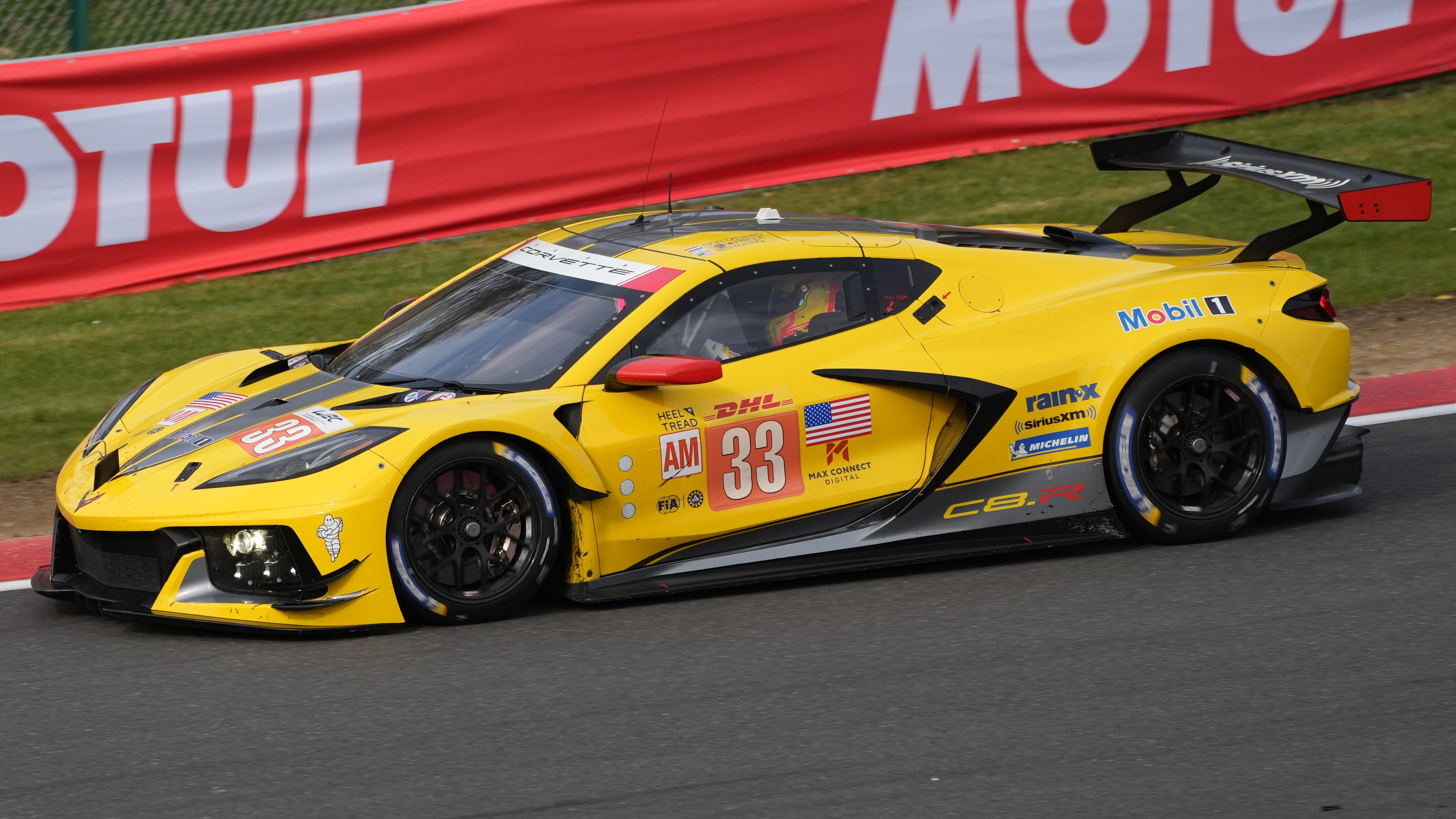
- Nicolás Varrone driving the No. 33 C8.R at the 2023 6 Hours of Spa-Francorchamps
- Category: IMSA SportsCar Championship GTD Pro; FIA World Endurance Championship LMGTE Am
- Constructor: (United States) Chevrolet (Pratt Miller)
- Designer: Vlad Kapitonov
- Predecessor: Chevrolet Corvette C7.R
- Successor: Chevrolet Corvette Z06 GT3.R

Technical specifications
- Chassis: Aluminum monocoque
- Length: 182.3 in (4,630 mm)
- Width: 80.7 in (2,050 mm)
- Height: 45.2 in (1,148 mm)
- Wheelbase: 107.2 in (2,723 mm)
- Engine: Chevrolet LT6.R 5.5 L (336 cu in) 90° V8 naturally aspirated, mid-engine, longitudinally mounted
- Transmission: Xtrac P529 6-speed sequential manual
- Power: 500 hp (373 kW) @ 7,400 rpm 480 pound force-feet (650 N⋅m)
- Weight: 1,245 kilograms (2,745 lb)
- Fuel: TotalEnergies (WEC); VP Racing Fuels (IMSA)
- Lubricants: Mobil 1

Competition history
- Notable entrants: (United States) Corvette Racing
- Notable drivers: (Spain) Antonio García (United States) Tommy Milner (United States) Jordan Taylor (United Kingdom) Oliver Gavin (Germany) Mike Rockenfeller (Switzerland) Marcel Fässler (Netherlands) Nicky Catsburg (United Kingdom) Nick Tandy (United Kingdom) Alexander Sims
- Debut: 2020 24 Hours of Daytona
- First win: 2020 WeatherTech 240
- Last win: 2023 Michelin GT Challenge at VIR
- Last event: 2023 8 Hours of Bahrain
Races	Wins	Podiums	Poles	F/Laps
61	22	50	23	14
- Teams' Championships: 3 (2020 & 2021 IMSA), 2023 FIA WEC)
- Constructors' Championships: 2 (2020, 2021)
- Drivers' Championships: 3 (2020 & 2021 IMSA), (2023 FIA WEC)

The Chevrolet Corvette C8.R is a grand tourer racing car built by Pratt Miller and Chevrolet for competition in endurance racing. It serves as the replacement for the Corvette C7.R, using the C8 generation Chevrolet Corvette as a base. Corvette Racing fielded the C8.R in the IMSA SportsCar Championship GT Le Mans (GTLM) class starting with the 2020 season. The car was built to LM GTE specifications as per GTLM rules.

In 2022, the GTLM class in the IMSA SportsCar Championship was replaced by the GT Daytona Pro (GTD Pro) class using GT3 machinery. As Corvette did not have any GT3 cars on the market (with the Chevrolet Corvette Z06 GT3.R not debuting until 2024), the C8.R was allowed to run in the GTD Pro class using a GTD kit. This year Corvette Racing would also field a full season entry in the WEC for the first time.

== Racing history ==
=== 2020 ===
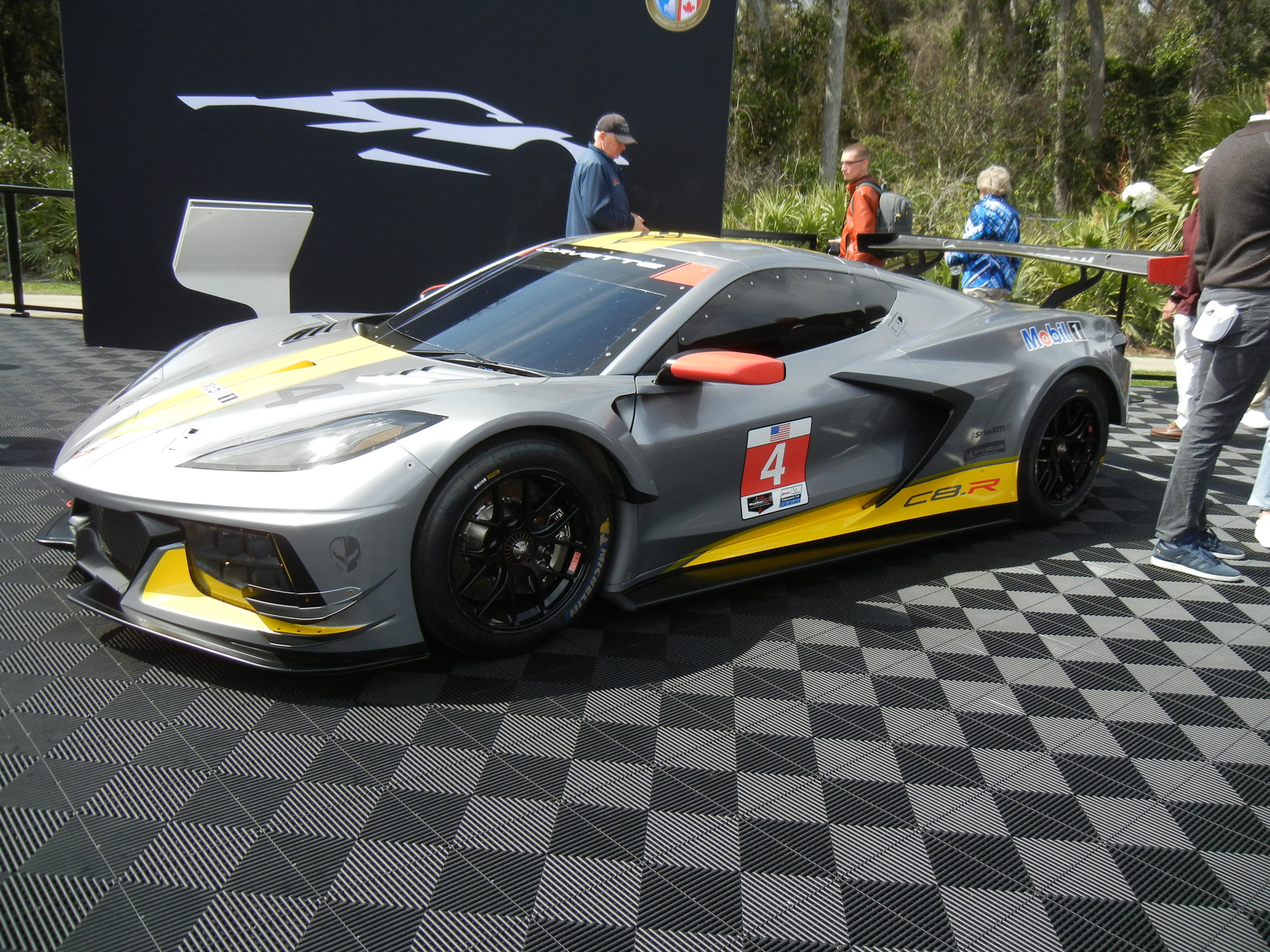
The No. 4 C8.R at the Amelia Island Concours d'Elegance

The Corvette C8.R made its competitive debut at the 2020 24 Hours of Daytona. The best of the Corvettes, the #3, finished 4th in the GTLM class and 16th overall with 785 laps. The second car, #4, finished the race in last place, after running into multiple issues. Throughout the rest of the season the Corvettes managed to score six class victories at Daytona, Sebring, Road America, Virginia, Mid-Ohio and Charlotte Motor Speedway. The #3 Corvette would end up taking the Championship. Corvette also made their WEC debut at the 2020 Lone Star Le Mans in the GTE pro class. Initially Corvette also entered the 2020 24 Hours of Le Mans, but had to withdraw due to the COVID-19 pandemic.

=== 2021 ===
At the beginning of the 2021, Corvette took a class victory in the 2021 24 Hours of Daytona. They also won their class at 6 other races, with the only opposition coming from Weathertech Racing and BMW. Corvette also returned to the WEC with a single entry at the 6 hours of Spa. This year also saw the C8.R's debut at the 24 hours of Le Mans, with the #64 Corvette managing to take 2nd place in class not far behind the winning Ferrari.

=== 2022 ===
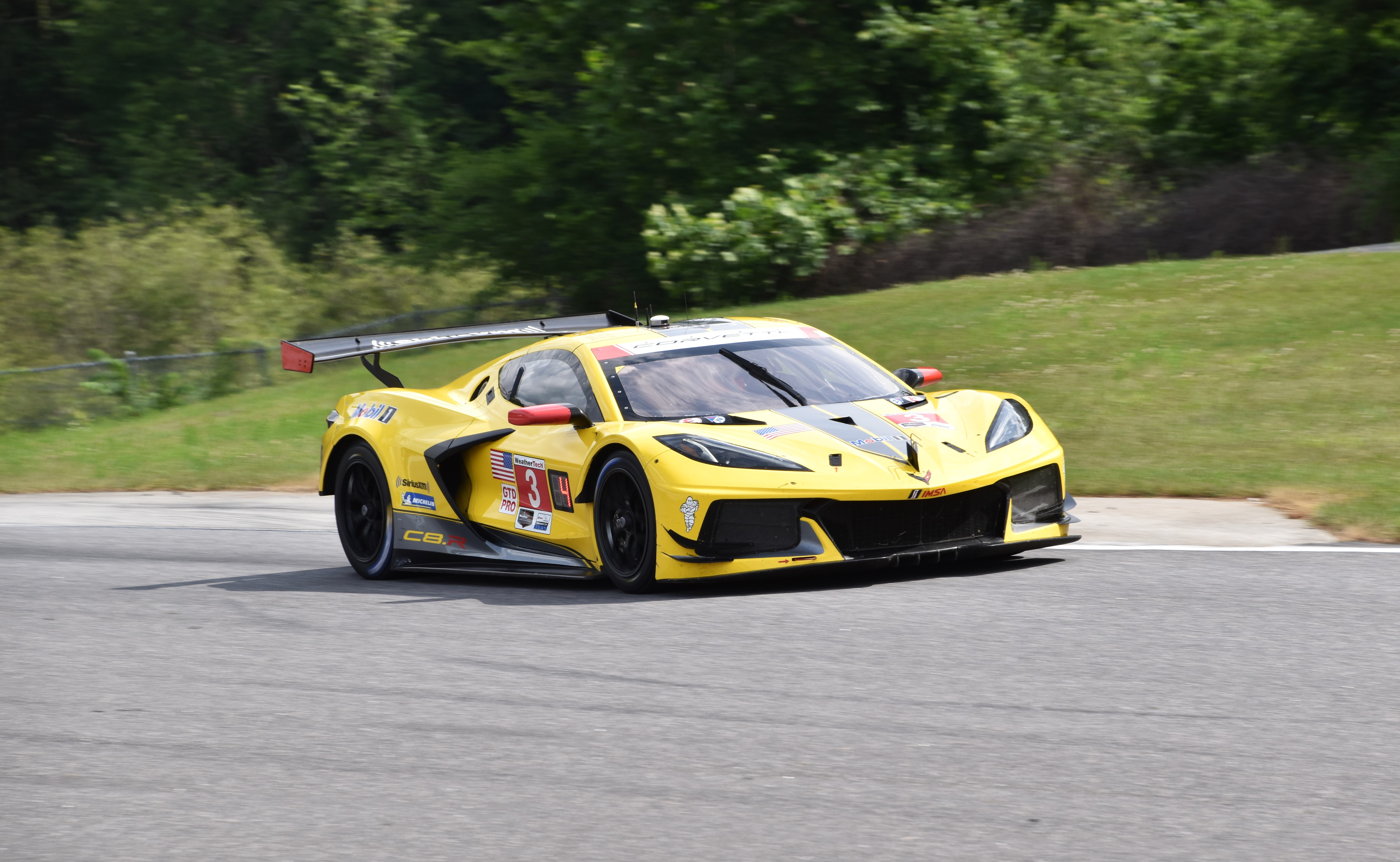
The No. 3 car at the 2022 Northeast Grand Prix

For 2022, Corvette entered only one car for the IMSA Weathertech Sportscar Championship, their other car entering full season in the 2022 FIA World Endurance Championship in the GTE Pro class. For IMSA the team developed a GTD kit, as the GTLM class had been replaced by GTD Pro. For the first race at Daytona the Corvettes faced a lot of reliability issues and BoP issues, meaning it wasn't very competitive. The squad however, quickly bounced back to win at Sebring, but would fail to earn a second trip to victory lane for the rest of the season. Eventually, the team settled for third in the final championship standings, behind the Pfaff Motorsports Porsche and Vasser-Sullivan's Lexus.

The FIA WEC half of the operation would earn a victory at Monza, and would place second at Sebring (separate from the 12 Hour-enduro IMSA race they won) and at Bahrain, but the Tommy Milner-Nick Tandy piloted entry was routinely outpaced by AF Corse's Ferrari and Porsche's factory effort. As a result, the two Corvette wheelmen wound up tied for sixth in the final points table.

=== 2023 ===
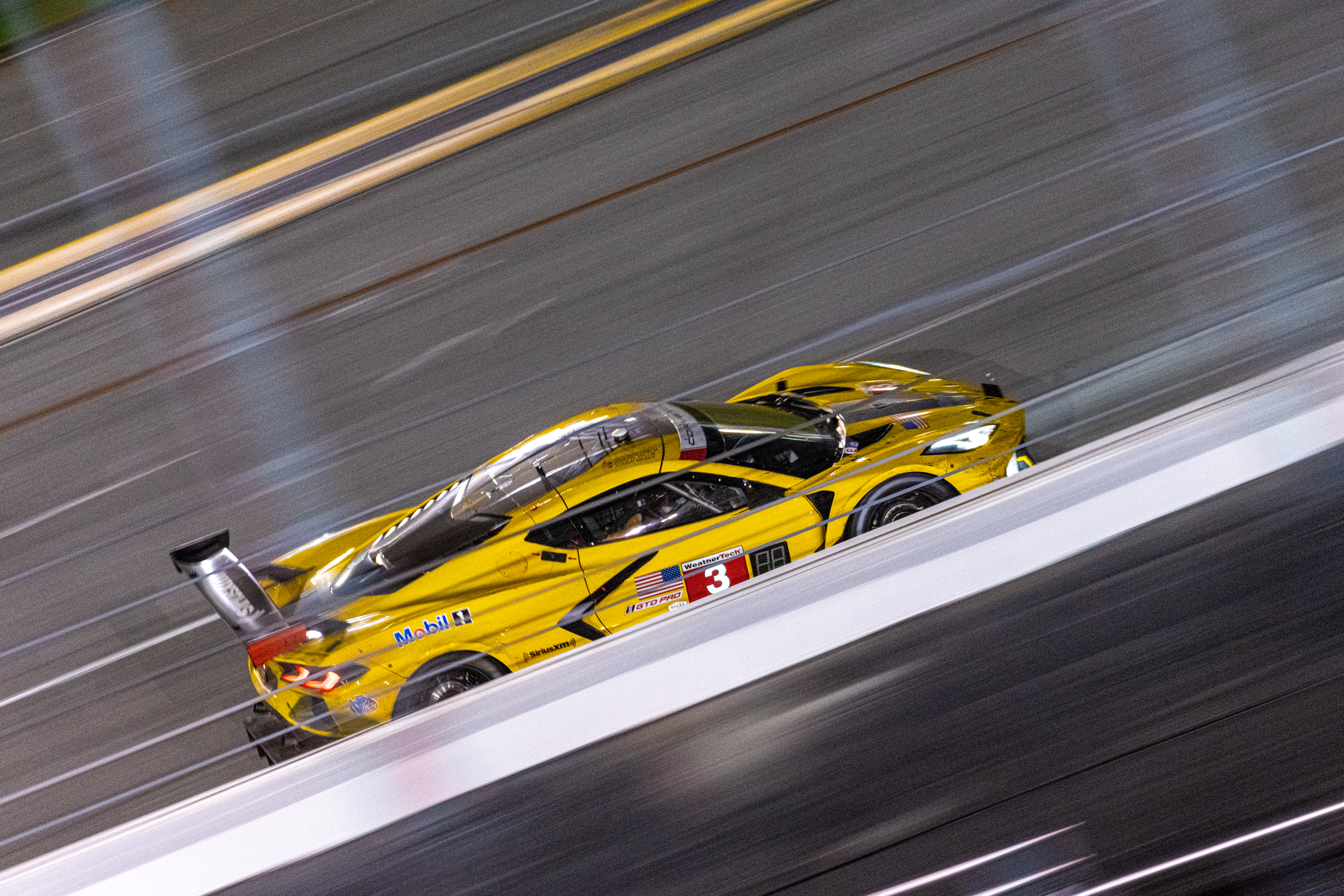
The No. 3 car at the 2023 24 Hours of Daytona

For 2023, Corvette Racing are continuing with their modified C8.R in GTD Pro. Jordan Taylor and Antonio García will drive at all events, with Tommy Milner joining them in the endurance rounds.

With the GTE-Pro class being eliminated for the 2023 FIA World Endurance Championship. Corvette's squad moved to GTE-Am. As a result of having to alter its driver lineup to meet the class regulations, Platinum-rated Nicky Catsburg will lead the squad, joined by Ben Keating, a Bronze-level driver, and Nicolás Varrone as their silver driver. Catsburg, Keating and Varrone won the GTE-Am class in the C8.R, in the 2023 24 Hours of Le Mans Centenary race.

On Sunday, July 9, at the 2023 WEC 6 Hours of Monza, Corvette Racing claimed the FIA World Endurance Championship's GTE Am division with two races remaining in the series.

== Competition History ==
=== Complete IMSA SportsCar Championship results ===
(key) Races in bold indicates pole position. Races in italics indicates fastest lap.

Complete IMSA SportsCar Championship results
Year	Entrant	Class	Drivers	No.	Rds.	Rounds												Pts.	Pos.
Year	Entrant	Class	Drivers	No.	Rds.	1	2	3	4	5	6	7	8	9	10	11	12	Pts.	Pos.
2020	(United States) Corvette Racing	GTLM	(Spain) Antonio García (United States) Jordan Taylor (Netherlands) Nicky Catsburg	3	All; All; 1, 9, 11	DAY 1; 4	DAY 2; 1	**SEB 1**; **2**	ELK; 1	VIR; 1	ATL 1; 5	**MOH**; **1**	**CLT**; **1**	**ATL 2**; **2**	**LGA**; **2**	**SEB 2**; **5**		351	1st
2020	(United States) Corvette Racing	GTLM	(United Kingdom) Oliver Gavin (United States) Tommy Milner (Switzerland) Marcel Fässler	4	All; All; 1, 9, 11	DAY 1; 7	**DAY 2**; **5**	SEB 1; 1	ELK; 2	VIR; 4	ATL 1; 2	MOH; 2	CLT; 4	ATL 2; 4	LGA; 6	SEB 2; 6		315	3rd
2021	(United States) Corvette Racing	GTLM	(Spain) Antonio García (United States) Jordan Taylor (Netherlands) Nicky Catsburg	3	All; All; 1-2, 12	DAY 1; 2	DAY 2; 1	**SEB**; **4**	BEL; 2	**WGL 1**; **1**	**WGL 2**; **1**	**LIM**; **1**	**ELK**; **2**	**LGA**; **2**	**LBH**; **2**	VIR; 2	ATL; 6	3549	1st
2021	(United States) Corvette Racing	GTLM	(United Kingdom) Nick Tandy (United States) Tommy Milner (United Kingdom) Alexander Sims	4	All; All; 1-2, 12	DAY 1; 1	**DAY 2**; **2**	SEB; 5	**BEL**; **1**	WGL 1; 4	WGL 2; 2	LIM; 2	ELK; 3	LGA; 1	LBH; 1	**VIR**; **1**	ATL; 4	3448	2nd
2022	(United States) Corvette Racing	GTD Pro	(Spain) Antonio García (United States) Jordan Taylor (Netherlands) Nicky Catsburg	3	All; All; 1-2, 12	DAY 1; 6	DAY 2; 6	SEB; 1	**LBH**; **3**	LGA; 4	WGL; 6	MOS; 2	LIM; 4	ELK; 3	VIR; 2	PET; 5		3194	3rd
2022	(United States) Corvette Racing	GTD Pro	(United Kingdom) Nick Tandy (United States) Tommy Milner (Denmark) Marco Sørensen	4	1; 1; 1	DAY 1; 7	DAY 2; 10	SEB	LBH	LGA	WGL	MOS	LIM	ELK	VIR	PET		234	35th
2023	(United States) Corvette Racing	GTD Pro	(Spain) Antonio García (United States) Jordan Taylor (United States) Tommy Milner	3	All; All; 1-2, 11	DAY; 2	**SEB**; **5**	LBH; 2	MON; 4	WGL; 3	MOS; 1	LIM; 4	ELK; 3	VIR; 1	IMS; 5	PET; 7		3579	3rd

=== Complete World Endurance Championship results ===
(key) Races in bold indicates pole position. Races in italics indicates fastest lap.

Complete FIA World Endurance Championship results
Year	Entrant	Class	Drivers	No.	Rds.	Rounds								Pts.	Pos.
Year	Entrant	Class	Drivers	No.	Rds.	1	2	3	4	5	6	7	8	Pts.	Pos.
2019–20	(United States) Corvette Racing	LMGTE Pro	(Germany) Mike Rockenfeller (Denmark) Jan Magnussen	63	5; 5	SIL	FUJ	SHA	BHR	COA; 6	SPA	LMN	BHR	0	NC
2021	(United States) Corvette Racing	LMGTE Pro	(Spain) Antonio García (United States) Jordan Taylor (Netherlands) Nicky Catsburg (United Kingdom) Oliver Gavin	63	1, 4; 4; 4; 1	SPA; 4	POR	MON	LMN; 2	BHR	BHR			0	NC
2021	(United States) Corvette Racing	LMGTE Pro	(United Kingdom) Nick Tandy (United States) Tommy Milner (United Kingdom) Alexander Sims	64	4; 4; 4	SPA	POR	MON	LMN; 6	BHR	BHR			0	NC
2022	(United States) Corvette Racing	LMGTE Pro	(Spain) Antonio García (United States) Jordan Taylor (Netherlands) Nicky Catsburg	63	3; 3; 3	SEB	SPA	LMN; RET	MZA	FUJ	BHR			0	NC
2022	(United States) Corvette Racing	LMGTE Pro	(United Kingdom) Nick Tandy (United States) Tommy Milner (United Kingdom) Alexander Sims	64	All; All; 3	SEB; 2	SPA; 4	**LMN**; **RET**	MZA; 1	FUJ; 5	BHR; 2			102	6th
2023	(United States) Corvette Racing	LMGTE Am	(United States) Ben Keating (Argentina) Nicolás Varrone (Netherlands) Nicky Catsburg	33	All; All; All	SEB; 1	**POR**; **1**	SPA; 2	**LMN**; **1**	MZA; 4	**FUJ**; **2**	BHR; 7		173	1st

=== Race Victories ===
Year	No.	Race title	Circuit	Class	Series
2020	1	WeatherTech 240	(United States) Daytona International Speedway	GTLM	IMSA
2020	2	Cadillac Grand Prix of Sebring	(United States) Sebring International Raceway	GTLM	IMSA
2020	3	IMSA SportsCar Weekend	(United States) Road America	GTLM	IMSA
2020	4	Michelin GT Challenge at VIR	(United States) Virginia International Raceway	GTLM	IMSA
2020	5	Acura Sports Car Challenge at Mid-Ohio	(United States) Mid-Ohio Sports Car Course	GTLM	IMSA
2020	6	MOTUL 100% Synthetic Grand Prix	(United States) Charlotte Motor Speedway	GTLM	IMSA
2021	7	Motul Pole Award 100	(United States) Daytona International Speedway	GTLM	IMSA
2021	8	Rolex 24 at Daytona	(United States) Daytona International Speedway	GTLM	IMSA
2021	9	Detroit Sports Car Classic	(United States) The Raceway on Belle Isle	GTLM	IMSA
2021	10	Sahlen's Six Hours of the Glen	(United States) Watkins Glen International	GTLM	IMSA
2021	11	WeatherTech 240 at the Glen	(United States) Watkins Glen International	GTLM	IMSA
2021	12	Northeast Grand Prix	(United States) Lime Rock Park	GTLM	IMSA
2021	13	IMSA Monterey Grand Prix	(United States) WeatherTech Raceway Laguna Seca	GTLM	IMSA
2021	14	Grand Prix of Long Beach	(United States) Long Beach Street Circuit	GTLM	IMSA
2021	15	Michelin GT Challenge at VIR	(United States) Virginia International Raceway	GTLM	IMSA
2022	16	Mobil 1 Twelve Hours of Sebring	(United States) Sebring International Raceway	GTD Pro	IMSA
2022	17	6 Hours of Monza	(Italy) Autodromo Nazionale di Monza	LMGTE Pro	WEC
2023	18	1000 Miles of Sebring	(United States) Sebring International Raceway	LMGTE Am	WEC
2023	19	6 Hours of Portimão	(Portugal) Algarve International Circuit	LMGTE Am	WEC
2023	20	24 Hours of Le Mans	(France) Circuit de la Sarthe	LMGTE Am	WEC
2023	21	Chevrolet Grand Prix at CTMP	(Canada) Canadian Tire Motorsport Park	GTD Pro	IMSA
2023	22	Michelin GT Challenge at VIR	(United States) Virginia International Raceway	GTD Pro	IMSA
