= 2020 Michelin GT Challenge at VIR =

Fifth round of the 2020 IMSA SportsCar Championship season

Track map of VIR

The 2020 Michelin GT Challenge at VIR was a sports car race sanctioned by the International Motor Sports Association (IMSA). The race was held at Virginia International Raceway in Alton, Virginia on August 22, 2020. This race was the fifth round of the 2020 WeatherTech SportsCar Championship, and the fourth round of the WeatherTech Sprint Cup.

The overall race was won by the #3 Corvette Racing team of Antonio García and Jordan Taylor, the duo's third and the team's fourth victories of the season. In GTD, Bill Auberlen collected his record-breaking 61st career IMSA victory, as Turner Motorsport scored their first class victory of the season.

== Background ==
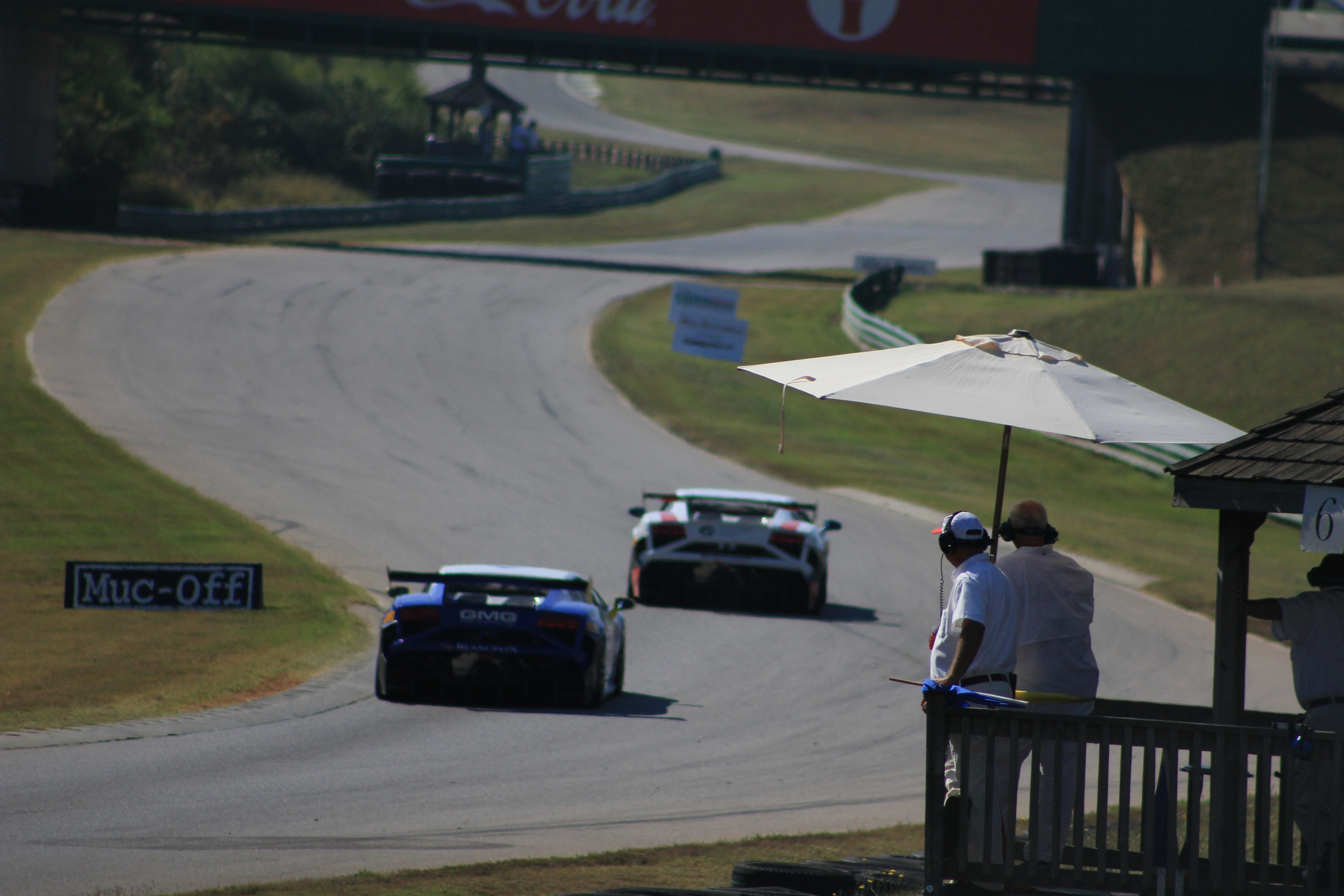
Virginia International Raceway, where the race was held.

Then International Motor Sports Association's (IMSA) president Scott Atherton confirmed the race was part of the schedule for the 2020 IMSA SportsCar Championship (IMSA SCC) in August 2019. It was the seventh consecutive year it was part of the IMSA SCC. The Michelin GT Challenge at VIR was the fifth of eleven sports car races of 2020 by IMSA, and the fourth of seven races on the WeatherTech Sprint Cup. The race was held at the 3.270 mi (5.263 km) Virginia International Raceway on August 22, 2020. Much like in previous years, the event was a GT only round, in which the GTLM and GTD classes were scheduled to compete. Due to a clash with the Indianapolis 500, the event was moved from August 23, 2020, to August 22, 2020.

Due to Virginia's COVID-19 gathering restrictions, fans were barred from attendance for the first time this season. The previous three rounds had limited attendance, but the VIR round was the first to outright prevent any fans from entering the grounds. Patrick Pilet and Nick Tandy entered the race as defending champions, although only Tandy participated in the 2020 iteration.

On August 14, 2020, IMSA released the latest technical bulleting, outlining the BoP for the race. In GTLM, the BMW M8 GTE received a five kilogram weight reduction, while the Corvette and Porsche received 20 kilogram weight increases. The Porsche also received a five-liter fuel capacity increase. In GTD, the Audi received a 20 kilogram weight reduction, while the Lexus (which had won the previous three events) had 15 kilograms of ballast added to its total weight.

Before the race, Antonio García and Jordan Taylor led the GTLM Drivers' Championship with 130 points, ahead of Earl Bamber and Laurens Vanthoor with 120 points, and Oliver Gavin and Tommy Milner with 117 points. With 87 points, Jack Hawksworth led the GTD Drivers' Championship, 1 point ahead of Townsend Bell and Frankie Montecalvo in second followed by Aaron Telitz in third. Chevrolet and Lexus were leading their respective Manufactures' Championships while Corvette Racing and AIM Vasser Sullivan each led their own Teams' Championships.

=== Entries ===
A total of 20 cars took part in the event, split across two classes. 6 were entered in GTLM, while 14 were entered in GTD. The lone change from the previous round was the return of Paul Miller Racing's Lamborghini Huracan, which had been absent since the opening race at Daytona.

== Practice ==
There were two practice sessions preceding the start of the race on Saturday, both on Friday. The first session lasted one hour on Friday morning while the second session lasted 75 minutes on Friday afternoon.

=== Practice 1 ===
The first practice session took place at 8:00 am ET on Friday and ended with Laurens Vanthoor topping the charts for Porsche GT Team, with a lap time of 1:41.550. The GTD class was topped by the #14 AIM Vasser Sullivan Lexus RC F GT3 of Jack Hawksworth with a time of 1:45.264. Patrick Long was second in the Wright Motorsports entry and Bryan Sellers rounded out the top 3. The session was red flagged four minutes in after Roman De Angelis in the #23 Heart of Racing Team Aston Martin hit the barrier at turn 4.

Pos.	Class	No.	Team	Driver	Time	Gap
1	GTLM	912	Porsche GT Team	Laurens Vanthoor	1:41.550	_
2	GTLM	911	Porsche GT Team	Nick Tandy	1:41.936	+0.386
3	GTLM	3	Corvette Racing	Antonio García	1:42.036	+0.486

=== Practice 2 ===
The second and final practice session took place at 12:00 pm ET on Friday and ended with Oliver Gavin topping the charts for Corvette Racing, with a lap time of 2:03.700. Aaron Telitz set the fastest time in GTD. Twelve of the twenty entries did not get a time in due to heavy rain.

Pos.	Class	No.	Team	Driver	Time	Gap
1	GTLM	4	Corvette Racing	Oliver Gavin	2:03.700	_
2	GTLM	912	Porsche GT Team	Laurens Vanthoor	2:04.385	+0.685
3	GTLM	911	Porsche GT Team	Frédéric Makowieck	2:04.818	+1.118

== Qualifying ==
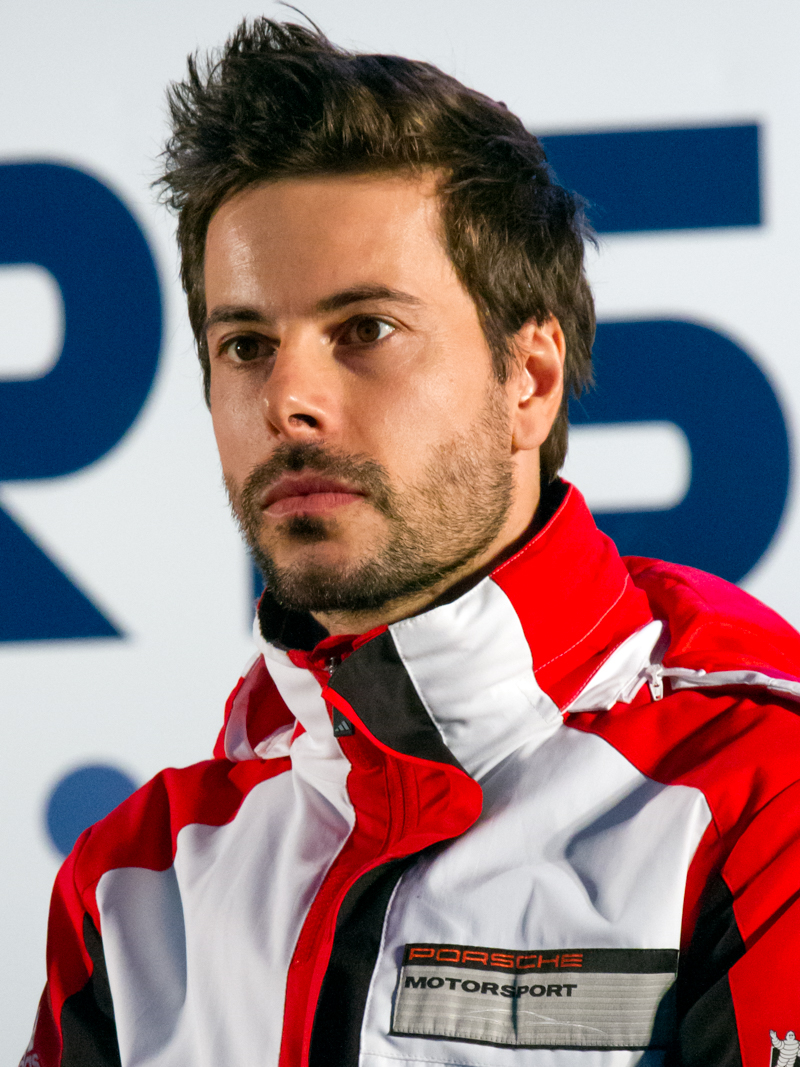
Frédéric Makowiecki (pictured in 2014) took the overall pole position for Porsche GT Team.

Friday's afternoon qualifying was broken into two sessions, with one session for the GTLM and GTD classes, which lasted for 15 minutes each, and a ten minute interval between the sessions. The rules dictated that all teams nominated a driver to qualify their cars, with the Pro-Am (GTD) class requiring a Bronze/Silver Rated Driver to qualify the car. The competitors' fastest lap times determined the starting order. IMSA then arranged the grid to put the GTLMs ahead of the GTD cars.

The first was for cars in GTD class. Corey Fergus qualified on pole for the class driving the #76 car for Compass Racing, beating Robby Foley in the Turner Motorsport entry by less than one-tenth of a second. The #12 Lexus of Frankie Montecalvo was third followed by Matt McMurry in the #86 Acura.

The final session of qualifying was for the GTLM class. Frédéric Makowiecki qualified on pole driving the #911 car for Porsche GT Team, beating teammate Laurens Vanthoor in the sister #912 Porsche GT Team entry by over one-tenth of a second.

=== Qualifying results ===
Pole positions in each class are indicated in bold and by ‡.

Pos.	Class	No.	Team	Driver	Time	Gap	Grid
1	**GTLM**	**911**	**(United States) Porsche GT Team**	**(France) Frédéric Makowiecki**	**1:40.389**	**_**	1‡
2	GTLM	912	(United States) Porsche GT Team	(Belgium) Laurens Vanthoor	1:40.519	+0.130	2
3	GTLM	25	(United States) BMW Team RLL	(United States) Connor De Phillippi	1:41.095	+0.706	3
4	GTLM	3	(United States) Corvette Racing	(United States) Jordan Taylor	1:41.228	+0.839	5^{1}
5	GTLM	4	(United States) Corvette Racing	(United Kingdom) Oliver Gavin	1:41.662	+1.273	6^{2}
6	GTLM	24	(United States) BMW Team RLL	(United States) John Edwards	1:41.716	+1.327	4
7	**GTD**	**76**	**(United States) Compass Racing**	**(United States) Corey Fergus**	**1:45.236**	**+4.847**	7‡
8	GTD	96	(United States) Turner Motorsport	(United States) Robby Foley	1:45.310	+4.921	8
9	GTD	12	(Canada) AIM Vasser Sullivan	(United States) Frankie Montecalvo	1:45.397	+5.008	9
10	GTD	86	(United States) Meyer Shank Racing with Curb-Agajanian	(United States) Matt McMurry	1:45.434	+5.045	10
11	GTD	48	(United States) Paul Miller Racing	(United States) Madison Snow	1:45.453	+5.064	11
12	GTD	14	(Canada) AIM Vasser Sullivan	(United States) Aaron Telitz	1:45.524	+5.135	12
13	GTD	63	(United States) Scuderia Corsa	(United States) Cooper MacNeil	1:45.565	+5.176	13
14	GTD	57	(United States) Heinricher Racing with MSR Curb-Agajanian	(Canada) Misha Goikhberg	1:45.570	+5.181	14
15	GTD	22	(United States) Gradient Racing	(United Kingdom) Till Bechtolsheimer	1:46.196	+5.807	15
16	GTD	23	(United States) Heart of Racing Team	(United Kingdom) Ian James	1:46.391	+6.002	16
17	GTD	74	(United States) Riley Motorsports	(United States) Gar Robinson	1:46.391	+6.002	18^{3}
18	GTD	16	(United States) Wright Motorsports	(United States) Ryan Hardwick	1:46.459	+6.070	17
19	GTD	30	(United States) Team Hardpoint	(United States) Rob Ferriol	1:46.726	+6.337	20^{4}
20	GTD	44	(United States) GRT Magnus	(United States) John Potter	1:48.186	+7.797	19^{5}
Sources:

- ^{1} The No. 3 Corvette Racing entry was moved to the back of the GTLM field as per Article 40.1.4 of the Sporting regulations (Change of starting tires).
- ^{2} The No. 4 Corvette Racing entry was moved to the back of the GTLM field as per Article 40.1.4 of the Sporting regulations (Change of starting tires).
- ^{3} The No. 74 Riley Motorsports entry was moved to the back of the GTD field as per Article 40.1.4 of the Sporting regulations (Change of starting tires).
- ^{4} The No. 30 Team Hardpoint entry was moved to the back of the GTD field as per Article 40.1.4 of the Sporting regulations (Change of starting tires).
- ^{5} The No. 44 GRT Magnus entry was moved to the back of the GTD field as per Article 40.1.4 of the Sporting regulations (Change of starting tires).

== Race ==
=== Post-race ===
With a total of 165 points, García and Taylor's victory allowed them to increase their advantage over Bamber and Vanthoor in the GTLM Drivers' Championship to 29 points. The result kept Hawksworth atop the GTD Drivers' Championship while Farnbacher and McMurry advanced from fourth to second. Foley and Auberlen jumped from ninth to fifth. Chevrolet and Lexus continued to top their respective Manufacturers' Championships while Corvette Racing and AIM Vasser Sullivan kept their respective advantages in their respective of Teams' Championships with six rounds remaining in the season.

=== Results ===
Class winners are denoted in bold and ‡.

Pos	Class	No.	Team	Drivers	Chassis	Laps	Time/retired
Pos	Class	No.	Team	Drivers	Engine	Laps	Time/retired
1	**GTLM**	**3**	**(United States) Corvette Racing**	**(Spain) Antonio García (United States) Jordan Taylor**	**Chevrolet Corvette C8.R**	**85**	**2:40:40.846‡**
1	**GTLM**	**3**	**(United States) Corvette Racing**	**(Spain) Antonio García (United States) Jordan Taylor**	**Chevrolet 5.5L V8**	**85**	**2:40:40.846‡**
2	GTLM	25	(United States) BMW Team RLL	(United States) Connor De Phillippi (Canada) Bruno Spengler	BMW M8 GTE	85	+3.521
2	GTLM	25	(United States) BMW Team RLL	(United States) Connor De Phillippi (Canada) Bruno Spengler	BMW S63 4.0L Turbo V8	85	+3.521
3	GTLM	911	(United States) Porsche GT Team	(France) Frédéric Makowiecki (United Kingdom) Nick Tandy	Porsche 911 RSR-19	85	+4.200
3	GTLM	911	(United States) Porsche GT Team	(France) Frédéric Makowiecki (United Kingdom) Nick Tandy	Porsche 4.2L Flat-6	85	+4.200
4	GTLM	4	(United States) Corvette Racing	(United Kingdom) Oliver Gavin (United States) Tommy Milner	Chevrolet Corvette C8.R	85	+1:10.860
4	GTLM	4	(United States) Corvette Racing	(United Kingdom) Oliver Gavin (United States) Tommy Milner	Chevrolet 5.5L V8	85	+1:10.860
5	**GTD**	**96**	**(United States) Turner Motorsport**	**(United States) Bill Auberlen (United States) Robby Foley**	**BMW M6 GT3**	**83**	**+2 Laps‡**
5	**GTD**	**96**	**(United States) Turner Motorsport**	**(United States) Bill Auberlen (United States) Robby Foley**	**BMW 4.4L Turbo V8**	**83**	**+2 Laps‡**
6	GTD	86	(United States) Meyer Shank Racing w/ Curb-Agajanian	(Germany) Mario Farnbacher (United States) Matt McMurry	Acura NSX GT3 Evo	83	+2 Laps
6	GTD	86	(United States) Meyer Shank Racing w/ Curb-Agajanian	(Germany) Mario Farnbacher (United States) Matt McMurry	Acura 3.5L Turbo V6	83	+2 Laps
7	GTD	74	(United States) Riley Motorsports	(United States) Lawson Aschenbach (United States) Gar Robinson	Mercedes-AMG GT3 Evo	83	+2 Laps
7	GTD	74	(United States) Riley Motorsports	(United States) Lawson Aschenbach (United States) Gar Robinson	Mercedes-AMG M159 6.2L V8	83	+2 Laps
8	GTD	14	(Canada) AIM Vasser Sullivan	(United Kingdom) Jack Hawksworth (United States) Aaron Telitz	Lexus RC F GT3	83	+2 Laps
8	GTD	14	(Canada) AIM Vasser Sullivan	(United Kingdom) Jack Hawksworth (United States) Aaron Telitz	Lexus 5.0L V8	83	+2 Laps
9	GTD	16	(United States) Wright Motorsports	(United States) Ryan Hardwick (United States) Patrick Long	Porsche 911 GT3 R	83	+2 Laps
9	GTD	16	(United States) Wright Motorsports	(United States) Ryan Hardwick (United States) Patrick Long	Porsche 4.0L Flat-6	83	+2 Laps
10	GTD	57	(United States) Heinricher Racing w/ MSR Curb-Agajanian	(Canada) Mikhail Goikhberg (Portugal) Álvaro Parente	Acura NSX GT3 Evo	83	+2 Laps
10	GTD	57	(United States) Heinricher Racing w/ MSR Curb-Agajanian	(Canada) Mikhail Goikhberg (Portugal) Álvaro Parente	Acura 3.5L Turbo V6	83	+2 Laps
11	GTD	44	(United States) GRT Magnus	(United States) Andy Lally (United States) John Potter	Lamborghini Huracán GT3 Evo	83	+2 Laps
11	GTD	44	(United States) GRT Magnus	(United States) Andy Lally (United States) John Potter	Lamborghini 5.2L V10	83	+2 Laps
12	GTD	23	(United States) Heart of Racing Team	(Canada) Roman De Angelis (United Kingdom) Ian James	Aston Martin Vantage GT3	83	+2 Laps
12	GTD	23	(United States) Heart of Racing Team	(Canada) Roman De Angelis (United Kingdom) Ian James	Aston Martin 4.0L Turbo V8	83	+2 Laps
13	GTD	12	(Canada) AIM Vasser Sullivan	(United States) Townsend Bell (United States) Frankie Montecalvo	Lexus RC F GT3	83	+2 Laps
13	GTD	12	(Canada) AIM Vasser Sullivan	(United States) Townsend Bell (United States) Frankie Montecalvo	Lexus 5.0L V8	83	+2 Laps
14	GTLM	912	(United States) Porsche GT Team	(New Zealand) Earl Bamber (Belgium) Laurens Vanthoor	Porsche 911 RSR-19	82	+3 Laps
14	GTLM	912	(United States) Porsche GT Team	(New Zealand) Earl Bamber (Belgium) Laurens Vanthoor	Porsche 4.2L Flat-6	82	+3 Laps
15	GTD	22	(United States) Gradient Racing	(United Kingdom) Till Bechtolsheimer (United States) Marc Miller	Acura NSX GT3 Evo	81	+4 Laps
15	GTD	22	(United States) Gradient Racing	(United Kingdom) Till Bechtolsheimer (United States) Marc Miller	Acura 3.5L Turbo V6	81	+4 Laps
16	GTD	76	(United States) Compass Racing	(United States) Corey Fergus (United States) Paul Holton	McLaren 720S GT3	74	Engine
16	GTD	76	(United States) Compass Racing	(United States) Corey Fergus (United States) Paul Holton	McLaren M840T 4.0L Turbo V8	74	Engine
17	GTLM	24	(United States) BMW Team RLL	(United States) John Edwards (Finland) Jesse Krohn	BMW M8 GTE	66	+19 Laps
17	GTLM	24	(United States) BMW Team RLL	(United States) John Edwards (Finland) Jesse Krohn	BMW S63 4.0L Turbo V8	66	+19 Laps
18	GTD	63	(United States) Scuderia Corsa	(United States) Cooper MacNeil (Finland) Toni Vilander	Ferrari 488 GT3	55	Engine
18	GTD	63	(United States) Scuderia Corsa	(United States) Cooper MacNeil (Finland) Toni Vilander	Ferrari F154CB 3.9L Turbo V8	55	Engine
19	GTD	30	(United States) Team Hardpoint	(United States) Rob Ferriol (United States) Spencer Pumpelly	Audi R8 LMS Evo	27	Crash
19	GTD	30	(United States) Team Hardpoint	(United States) Rob Ferriol (United States) Spencer Pumpelly	Audi 5.2L V10	27	Crash
20	GTD	48	(United States) Paul Miller Racing	(United States) Bryan Sellers (United States) Madison Snow	Lamborghini Huracán GT3 Evo	83	Disqualified
20	GTD	48	(United States) Paul Miller Racing	(United States) Bryan Sellers (United States) Madison Snow	Lamborghini 5.2L V10	83	Disqualified

== Standings after the race ==
DPi Drivers' Championship standings
Pos.	+/–	Driver	Points
1		(Australia) Ryan Briscoe (Netherlands) Renger van der Zande	124
2		(France) Sébastien Bourdais (Portugal) João Barbosa	118
3		(United Kingdom) Oliver Jarvis (United States) Tristan Nunez	117
4		(Brazil) Pipo Derani	115
5		(United States) Jonathan Bomarito (United Kingdom) Harry Tincknell	112

LMP2 Drivers' Championship standings
Pos.	+/–	Driver	Points
1		(Canada) Cameron Cassels	64
2		(United States) Patrick Kelly	63
3		(Sweden) Henrik Hedman	61
4		(United States) Dwight Merriman (United Kingdom) Kyle Tilley	60
5		(United States) Spencer Pigot	35

GTLM Drivers' Championship standings
Pos.	+/–	Driver	Points
1		(Spain) Antonio García (United States) Jordan Taylor	165
2		(New Zealand) Earl Bamber (Belgium) Laurens Vanthoor	146
3		(United Kingdom) Oliver Gavin (United States) Tommy Milner	145
4	1	(France) Frédéric Makowiecki (United Kingdom) Nick Tandy	143
5	1	(United States) John Edwards (Finland) Jesse Krohn	141

GTD Drivers' Championship standings
Pos.	+/–	Driver	Points
1		(United Kingdom) Jack Hawksworth	115
2	2	(Germany) Mario Farnbacher (United States) Matt McMurry	115
3		(United States) Aaron Telitz	112
4	2	(United States) Townsend Bell (United States) Frankie Montecalvo	108
5	4	(United States) Robby Foley (United States) Bill Auberlen	107

- Note: Only the top five positions are included for all sets of standings.

DPi Teams' Championship standings
Pos.	+/–	Team	Points
1		(United States) #10 Konica Minolta Cadillac DPi-V.R	124
2		(United States) #5 Mustang Sampling Racing / JDC-Miller MotorSports	118
3		(Canada) #77 Mazda Motorsports	117
4		(United States) #31 Whelen Engineering Racing	115
5		(Canada) #55 Mazda Motorsports	112

LMP2 Teams' Championship standings
Pos.	+/–	Team	Points
1		(United States) #38 Performance Tech Motorsports	64
2		(United States) #52 PR1/Mathiasen Motorsports	63
3		(United States) #81 DragonSpeed USA	61
4		(United States) #18 Era Motorsport	60
5		(United States) #8 Tower Motorsport by Starworks	28

GTLM Teams' Championship standings
Pos.	+/–	Team	Points
1		(United States) #3 Corvette Racing	165
2		(United States) #912 Porsche GT Team	146
3		(United States) #4 Corvette Racing	145
4	1	(United States) #911 Porsche GT Team	143
5	1	(United States) #24 BMW Team RLL	141

GTD Teams' Championship standings
Pos.	+/–	Team	Points
1		(Canada) #14 AIM Vasser Sullivan	115
2	3	(United States) #86 Meyer Shank Racing with Curb-Agajanian	115
3	1	(Canada) #12 AIM Vasser Sullivan	108
4	3	(United States) #96 Turner Motorsport	107
5	1	(United States) #16 Wright Motorsports	104

- Note: Only the top five positions are included for all sets of standings.

DPi Manufacturers' Championship standings
Pos.	+/–	Manufacturer	Points
1		(United States) Cadillac	134
2		(Japan) Mazda	129
3		(Japan) Acura	125

GTLM Manufacturers' Championship standings
Pos.	+/–	Manufacturer	Points
1		(United States) Chevrolet	170
2		(Germany) BMW	159
3		(Germany) Porsche	156
4		(Italy) Ferrari	28

GTD Manufacturers' Championship standings
Pos.	+/–	Manufacturer	Points
1		(Japan) Lexus	122
2		(Japan) Acura	121
3	3	(Germany) BMW	113
4		(Germany) Porsche	110
5		(Italy) Lamborghini	108

- Note: Only the top five positions are included for all sets of standings.

IMSA SportsCar Championship
Previous race: 2020 IMSA SportsCar Weekend	2020 season	Next race: 2020 TireRack.com Grand Prix at Road Atlanta
