= 2020 MOTUL 100% Synthetic Grand Prix =

Eighth round of the 2020 IMSA SportsCar Championship season

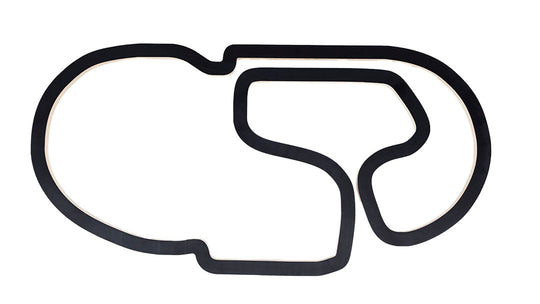
Charlotte Motor Speedway Roval (2018–present)

The 2020 MOTUL 100% Synthetic Grand Prix was a sports car race sanctioned by the International Motor Sports Association (IMSA). The race was held at the Charlotte Motor Speedway ROVAL in Concord, North Carolina on October 10, 2020. This race was the eighth round of the 2020 WeatherTech SportsCar Championship, and the sixth round of the 2020 WeatherTech Sprint Cup.

The overall race was won by the #3 team of Jordan Taylor and Antonio García, the duo's fifth of the season. The Turner Motorsport team of Robby Foley and Bill Auberlen took victory in the GTD class, their second win of the season.

== Background ==
The race replaced the Northeast Grand Prix at Lime Rock Park due to travel issues regarding the COVID-19 pandemic in Connecticut, meaning the race would be run as part of a triple-header weekend and a double-header Saturday evening with the NASCAR Cup and NASCAR Xfinity Series. The race was the shortest of the 2020 season, as the race was scheduled for the length of the Detroit and Long Beach rounds that had been cancelled because of the pandemic as two-hour races (1 hour, 40 minutes) in length, and was one of two events that included only entries from the GTLM and GTD classes (as it was moved from Lime Rock). The race also marked the first time since 2000 that an IMSA series raced at Charlotte Motor Speedway. In late September, Motul was announced as the primary sponsor of the event. The event was the eighth of eleven sports car races of 2020 by IMSA, and the event was the sixth of seven races on the WeatherTech Sprint Cup. The race was held at the 2.280 mi (3.669 km) Charlotte Motor Speedway Roval on October 10, 2020.

On October 2, 2020, IMSA released the latest technical bulletin regarding the Balance of Performance for the race. In the GTLM class, the Porsche 911 received a 15 kilogram weight reduction, while no other changes were made to other cars in the class. In GTD, the Ferrari 488 received a 6.7 horsepower increase, a 5 kilogram increase in minimum weight, and a one-liter increase in fuel capacity.

Before the race, Antonio García and Jordan Taylor led the GTLM Drivers' Championship with 226 points, ahead of Oliver Gavin and Tommy Milner with 209 points, and Connor De Phillippi and Bruno Spengler with 204 points. With 176 points, Mario Farnbacher and Matt McMurry led the GTD Drivers' Championship, ahead of Aaron Telitz. Chevrolet and Lexus were leading their respective Manufactures' Championships while Corvette Racing and Meyer Shank Racing with Curb-Agajanian each led their own Teams' Championships.

=== Entries ===
A total of 18 cars took part in the event, the lowest number of entries that season, but because the two prototype classes were not scheduled to participate in this event, there were more cars between the two participating classes for this race than the previous round at Mid-Ohio. There were six cars in the GTLM class, two more than at Mid-Ohio, when the CORE Autosport-run Porsche GT Team skipped the previous round due to novel coronavirus concerns within the Porsche factory camp following the 24 Heures du Mans, and twelve cars in the GTD class, the same as the preceding event. Jeff Kingsley made his series debut in the Compass McLaren. Despite the BoP break, Scuderia Corsa missed their second consecutive event, with driver Cooper MacNeil focusing on a championship in the Ferrari Challenge. Frankie Montecalvo was replaced in the #12 AIM Vasser Sullivan entry by Michael De Quesada, as the former was getting married (originally, this race was to have been held at Lime Rock Park on July 17–18, and later rescheduled to October 30–31 before being moved to Charlotte where promoters moved the dates to be part of the NASCAR weekend after state authorities rejected the event over travel restrictions).

== Practice ==
There were two practice sessions preceding the start of the race on Saturday, one on Friday and one on Saturday. The first session lasted one hour on Friday while the second session on Saturday lasted 75 minutes.

=== Practice 1 ===
The first practice session took place at 7:30 pm ET on Friday and ended with Jesse Krohn topping the charts for BMW Team RLL, with a lap time of 1:15.482. Mario Farnbacher set the fastest time in GTD. The session was red flagged for 13 minutes after Michael De Quesada in the #12 Lexus crashed at turn 8. IMSA extended the session by ten minutes as compensation.

Pos.	Class	No.	Team	Driver	Time	Gap
1	GTLM	24	BMW Team RLL	Jesse Krohn	1:15.482	_
2	GTLM	25	BMW Team RLL	Bruno Spengler	1:15.551	+0.069
3	GTLM	911	Porsche GT Team	Nick Tandy	1:15.606	+0.124

=== Practice 2 ===
The second and final practice session took place at 9:45 am ET on Saturday and ended with Tommy Milner topping the charts for Corvette Racing, with a lap time of 1:14.935. The GTD class was topped by the #96 Turner Motorsport BMW M6 GT3 of Bill Auberlen with a time of 1:19.475. Lawson Aschenbach was second in the Riley Motorsports entry and Jack Hawksworth rounded out the top 3. The session was red flagged with 22 minutes remaining after the #22 Gradient Racing Acura NSX GT3 Evo of Marc Miller suffered a loose wheel after crashing at turn 7 and stopped on the track.

Pos.	Class	No.	Team	Driver	Time	Gap
1	GTLM	4	Corvette Racing	Tommy Milner	1:14.935	_
2	GTLM	911	Porsche GT Team	Frédéric Makowieck	1:15.103	+0.168
3	GTLM	24	BMW Team RLL	Jesse Krohn	1:15.125	+0.190

== Qualifying ==
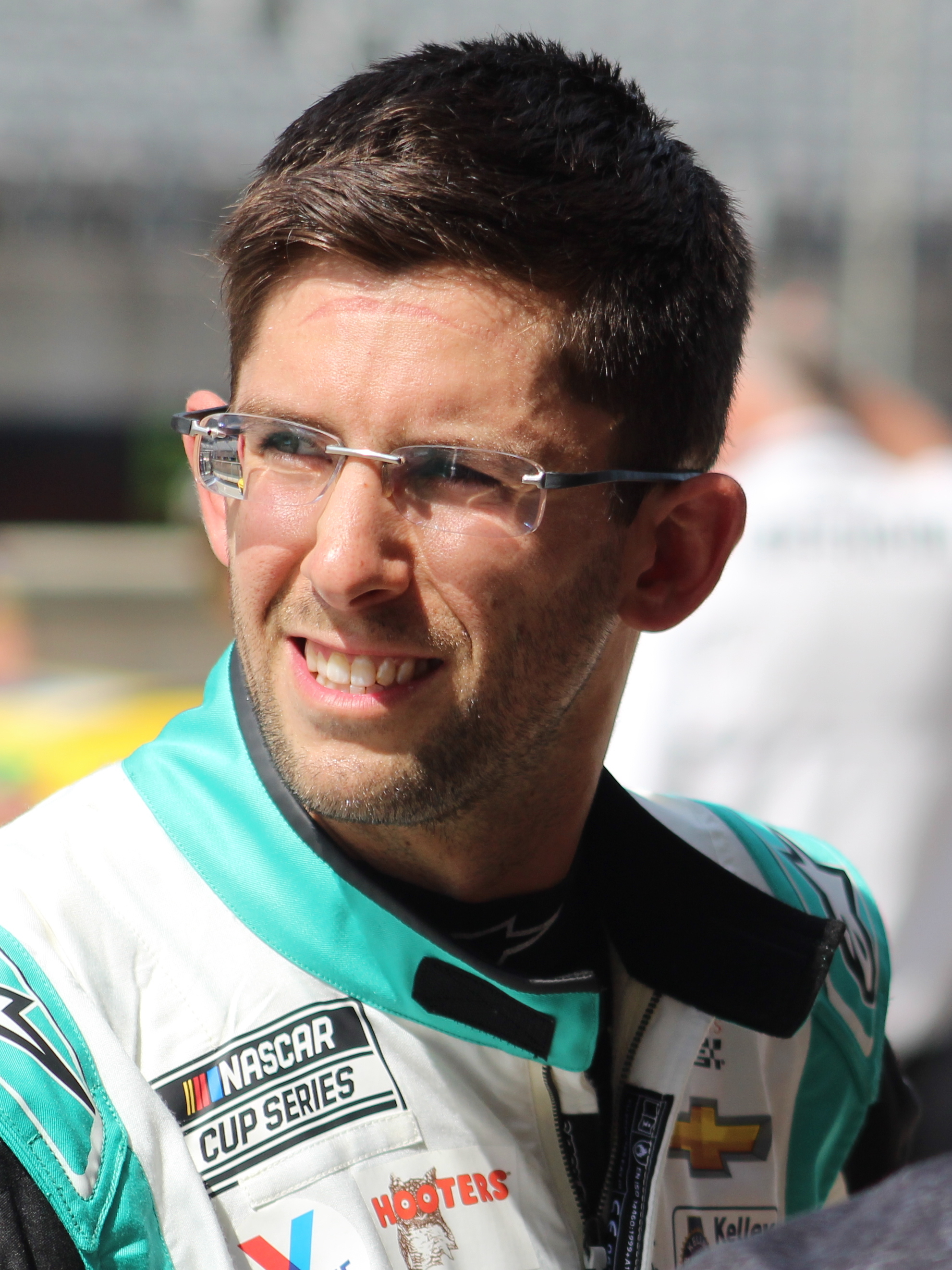
Jordan Taylor (pictured in 2023) secured the overall pole position for Corvette Racing.

Saturday's afternoon qualifying was broken into two sessions, with one session for the GTLM and GTD classes, which lasted for 15 minutes each, and a ten-minute interval between the sessions. The rules dictated that all teams nominated a driver to qualify their cars, with the Pro-Am (GTD) class requiring a Bronze/Silver Rated Driver to qualify the car. The competitors' fastest lap times determined the starting order. IMSA then arranged the grid to put the GTLMs ahead of the GTD cars.

The first was for cars in the GTD class. Aaron Telitz qualified on pole for the class driving the #14 car for AIM Vasser Sullivan, besting Robby Foley in the Turner Motorsport entry. Telitz suffered minor contact with the outside wall coming out of the final chicane while Kingsley and Rob Ferriol made contact coming into said chicane. The session ended early when, Misha Goikhberg, driving the #57 Heinricher Racing with MSR Curb-Agajanian, hit the wall at turn 7 and was unable to get his car going again. For causing the red flag, Goikhberg had his best two laps from the session deleted. Ryan Hardwick completed two flaps under the red flag and served a five-minute-stop-and-hold penalty.

The final session of qualifying was for cars in the GTLM class. Jordan Taylor qualified on pole driving the #3 car for Corvette Racing, beating Frédéric Makowiecki in the #911 Porsche GT Team by less than one-tenth of a second. The session saw one incident when, Laurens Vanthoor driving the #912 Porsche GT Team entry, broke his Porsche's rear suspension in an accident at turn 7 that drew a red flag. Vanthoor had his best two laps from the session deleted for causing a red flag, effectively leaving him with no time set. As the session came to a close, Jesse Krohn knocked the mirror off his BMW in turn 1.

=== Qualifying results ===
Pole positions in each class are indicated in bold and by ‡.

Pos.	Class	No.	Team	Driver	Time	Gap	Grid
1	**GTLM**	**3**	**(United States) Corvette Racing**	**(United States) Jordan Taylor**	**1:14.278**	**_**	1‡
2	GTLM	911	(United States) Porsche GT Team	(France) Frédéric Makowiecki	1:14.334	+0.056	2
3	GTLM	25	(United States) BMW Team RLL	(Canada) Bruno Spengler	1:14.730	+0.452	3
4	GTLM	24	(United States) BMW Team RLL	(Finland) Jesse Krohn	1:14.824	+0.546	4
5	GTLM	4	(United States) Corvette Racing	(United Kingdom) Oliver Gavin	1:15.067	+0.789	5
6	**GTD**	**14**	**(Canada) AIM Vasser Sullivan**	**(United States) Aaron Telitz**	**1:17.954**	**+3.676**	7‡
7	GTD	96	(United States) Turner Motorsport	(United States) Robby Foley	1:18.077	+3.799	8
8	GTD	86	(United States) Meyer Shank Racing with Curb-Agajanian	(United States) Matt McMurry	1:18.091	+3.813	9
9	GTD	76	(United States) Compass Racing	(Canada) Jeff Kingsley	1:18.147	+3.869	10
10	GTD	16	(United States) Wright Motorsports	(United States) Ryan Hardwick	1:18.232	+3.954	11
11	GTD	74	(United States) Riley Motorsports	(United States) Gar Robinson	1:18.540	+4.262	12
12	GTD	22	(United States) Gradient Racing	(United Kingdom) Till Bechtolsheimer	1:18.725	+4.447	13
13	GTD	12	(Canada) AIM Vasser Sullivan	(United States) Michael De Quesada	1:18.923	+4.645	14
14	GTD	23	(United States) Heart of Racing Team	(United Kingdom) Ian James	1:19.299	+5.021	15
15	GTD	44	(United States) GRT Magnus	(United States) John Potter	1:20.102	+5.824	16
16	GTD	30	(United States) Team Hardpoint	(United States) Rob Ferriol	1:21.235	+6.957	17
17	GTD	57	(United States) Heinricher Racing with MSR Curb-Agajanian	(Canada) Misha Goikhberg	1:22.908^{1}	+8.630	18
18	GTLM	912	(United States) Porsche GT Team	(Belgium) Laurens Vanthoor	no time^{2}	–	6
Sources:

- ^{1} The No. 57 Heinricher Racing with MSR Curb-Agajanian entry had its two fastest laps deleted as penalty for causing a red flag during its qualifying session.
- ^{2} The No. 912 Porsche GT Team entry had its two fastest laps deleted as penalty for causing a red flag during its qualifying session.

== Race ==
=== Post-race ===
With a total of 261 points, García and Taylor's victory allowed them to increase their advantage over Gavin and Milner in the GTLM Drivers' Championship to 24 points. The result Farnbacher and McMurry atop the GTD Drivers' Championship while Hardwick and Long advanced from fourth to third. Bell jumped from sixth to fifth. Chevrolet and Lexus continued to top their respective Manufacturers' Championships while Corvette Racing and Meyer Shank Racing with Curb-Agajanian kept their respective advantages in their respective of Teams' Championships with three rounds remaining in the season.

=== Results ===
Class winners are denoted in bold and ‡.

Pos	Class	No.	Team	Drivers	Chassis	Laps	Time/Retired
Pos	Class	No.	Team	Drivers	Engine	Laps	Time/Retired
1	**GTLM**	**3**	**(United States) Corvette Racing**	**(United States) Jordan Taylor (Spain) Antonio García**	**Chevrolet Corvette C8.R**	**62**	**1:40:08.170‡**
1	**GTLM**	**3**	**(United States) Corvette Racing**	**(United States) Jordan Taylor (Spain) Antonio García**	**Chevrolet 5.5L V8**	**62**	**1:40:08.170‡**
2	GTLM	24	(United States) BMW Team RLL	(United States) John Edwards (Finland) Jesse Krohn	BMW M8 GTE	62	+1.474
2	GTLM	24	(United States) BMW Team RLL	(United States) John Edwards (Finland) Jesse Krohn	BMW S63 4.0L Turbo V8	62	+1.474
3	GTLM	25	(United States) BMW Team RLL	(United States) Connor De Phillippi (Canada) Bruno Spengler	BMW M8 GTE	62	+2.059
3	GTLM	25	(United States) BMW Team RLL	(United States) Connor De Phillippi (Canada) Bruno Spengler	BMW S63 4.0L Turbo V8	62	+2.059
4	**GTD**	**96**	**(United States) Turner Motorsport**	**(United States) Robby Foley (United States) Bill Auberlen**	**BMW M6 GT3**	**61**	**+1 Lap‡**
4	**GTD**	**96**	**(United States) Turner Motorsport**	**(United States) Robby Foley (United States) Bill Auberlen**	**BMW 4.4L Turbo V8**	**61**	**+1 Lap‡**
5	GTD	16	(United States) Wright Motorsports	(United States) Ryan Hardwick (United States) Patrick Long	Porsche 911 GT3 R	61	+1 Lap
5	GTD	16	(United States) Wright Motorsports	(United States) Ryan Hardwick (United States) Patrick Long	Porsche 4.0L Flat-6	61	+1 Lap
6	GTD	23	(United States) Heart of Racing Team	(United Kingdom) Ian James (Canada) Roman De Angelis	Aston Martin Vantage AMR GT3	61	+1 Lap
6	GTD	23	(United States) Heart of Racing Team	(United Kingdom) Ian James (Canada) Roman De Angelis	Aston Martin 4.0L Turbo V8	61	+1 Lap
7	GTD	12	(Canada) AIM Vasser Sullivan	(United States) Michael De Quesada (United States) Townsend Bell	Lexus RC F GT3	61	+1 Lap
7	GTD	12	(Canada) AIM Vasser Sullivan	(United States) Michael De Quesada (United States) Townsend Bell	Lexus 5.0L V8	61	+1 Lap
8	GTD	57	(United States) Heinricher Racing with MSR Curb-Agajanian	(Portugal) Álvaro Parente (Canada) Mikhail Goikhberg	Acura NSX GT3 Evo	61	+1 Lap
8	GTD	57	(United States) Heinricher Racing with MSR Curb-Agajanian	(Portugal) Álvaro Parente (Canada) Mikhail Goikhberg	Acura 3.5L Turbo V6	61	+1 Lap
9	GTD	30	(United States) Team Hardpoint	(United States) Rob Ferriol (United States) Spencer Pumpelly	Audi R8 LMS Evo	61	+1 Lap
9	GTD	30	(United States) Team Hardpoint	(United States) Rob Ferriol (United States) Spencer Pumpelly	Audi 5.2L V10	61	+1 Lap
10	GTD	86	(United States) Meyer Shank Racing with Curb-Agajanian	(Germany) Mario Farnbacher (United States) Matt McMurry	Acura NSX GT3 Evo	61	+1 Lap
10	GTD	86	(United States) Meyer Shank Racing with Curb-Agajanian	(Germany) Mario Farnbacher (United States) Matt McMurry	Acura 3.5L Turbo V6	61	+1 Lap
11	GTD	14	(Canada) AIM Vasser Sullivan	(United Kingdom) Jack Hawksworth (United States) Aaron Telitz	Lexus RC F GT3	61	+1 Lap
11	GTD	14	(Canada) AIM Vasser Sullivan	(United Kingdom) Jack Hawksworth (United States) Aaron Telitz	Lexus 5.0L V8	61	+1 Lap
12	GTD	76	(United States) Compass Racing	(Canada) Jeff Kingsley (United States) Paul Holton	McLaren 720S GT3	60	+2 Laps
12	GTD	76	(United States) Compass Racing	(Canada) Jeff Kingsley (United States) Paul Holton	McLaren M840T 4.0L Turbo V8	60	+2 Laps
13	GTD	74	(United States) Riley Motorsports	(United States) Lawson Aschenbach (United States) Gar Robinson	Mercedes-AMG GT3 Evo	60	+2 Laps
13	GTD	74	(United States) Riley Motorsports	(United States) Lawson Aschenbach (United States) Gar Robinson	Mercedes-AMG M159 G.2L V8	60	+2 Laps
14 DNF	GTLM	4	(United States) Corvette Racing	(United Kingdom) Oliver Gavin (United States) Tommy Milner	Chevrolet Corvette C8.R	54	Accident
14 DNF	GTLM	4	(United States) Corvette Racing	(United Kingdom) Oliver Gavin (United States) Tommy Milner	Chevrolet 5.5L V8	54	Accident
15 DNF	GTD	44	(United States) GRT Magnus	(United States) John Potter (United States) Andy Lally	Lamborghini Huracán GT3 Evo	25	Tire Failures
15 DNF	GTD	44	(United States) GRT Magnus	(United States) John Potter (United States) Andy Lally	Lamborghini 5.2L V10	25	Tire Failures
16 DNF	GTD	22	(United States) Gradient Racing	(United Kingdom) Till Bechtolsheimer (United States) Marc Miller	Acura NSX GT3 Evo	22	Accident
16 DNF	GTD	22	(United States) Gradient Racing	(United Kingdom) Till Bechtolsheimer (United States) Marc Miller	Acura 3.5L Turbo V6	22	Accident
17 DNF	GTLM	911	(United States) Porsche GT Team	(France) Frédéric Makowiecki (United Kingdom) Nick Tandy	Porsche 911 RSR-19	8	Accident
17 DNF	GTLM	911	(United States) Porsche GT Team	(France) Frédéric Makowiecki (United Kingdom) Nick Tandy	Porsche 4.2L Flat-6	8	Accident
18 DNF	GTLM	912	(United States) Porsche GT Team	(New Zealand) Earl Bamber (Belgium) Laurens Vanthoor	Porsche 911 RSR-19	4	Accident
18 DNF	GTLM	912	(United States) Porsche GT Team	(New Zealand) Earl Bamber (Belgium) Laurens Vanthoor	Porsche 4.2L Flat-6	4	Accident

== Standings after the race ==
NOTE: Only classes that participated in this race are listed.

GTLM Drivers' Championship standings
Pos.	+/–	Driver	Points
1		(Spain) Antonio García (United States) Jordan Taylor	261
2		(United Kingdom) Oliver Gavin (United States) Tommy Milner	237
3		(United States) Connor De Phillippi (Canada) Bruno Spengler	234
4		(United States) John Edwards (Finland) Jesse Krohn	231
5	1	(France) Frédéric Makowiecki (United Kingdom) Nick Tandy	197

GTD Drivers' Championship standings
Pos.	+/–	Driver	Points
1		(Germany) Mario Farnbacher (United States) Matt McMurry	200
2		(United States) Aaron Telitz	196
3	1	(United States) Ryan Hardwick (United States) Patrick Long	196
4	1	(United Kingdom) Jack Hawksworth	194
5	1	(United States) Townsend Bell	183

- Note: Only the top five positions are included for all sets of standings.

GTLM Teams' Championship standings
Pos.	+/–	Team	Points
1		(United States) #3 Corvette Racing	261
2		(United States) #4 Corvette Racing	237
3		(United States) #25 BMW Team RLL	234
4		(United States) #24 BMW Team RLL	231
5	1	(United States) #911 Porsche GT Team	197

GTD Teams' Championship standings
Pos.	+/–	Team	Points
1		(United States) #86 Meyer Shank Racing with Curb-Agajanian	200
2	1	(United States) #16 Wright Motorsports	196
3	1	(Canada) #14 AIM Vasser Sullivan	194
4	1	(Canada) #12 AIM Vasser Sullivan	183
5	1	(United States) #96 Turner Motorsport	182

- Note: Only the top five positions are included for all sets of standings.

GTLM Manufacturers' Championship standings
Pos.	+/–	Manufacturer	Points
1		(United States) Chevrolet	272
2		(Germany) BMW	258
3		(Germany) Porsche	216
4		(Italy) Ferrari	28

GTD Manufacturers' Championship standings
Pos.	+/–	Manufacturer	Points
1		(Japan) Lexus	211
2		(Japan) Acura	208
3		(Germany) Porsche	202
4	2	(Germany) BMW	194
5	1	(Germany) Mercedes-AMG	190

- Note: Only the top five positions are included for all sets of standings.

IMSA SportsCar Championship
Previous race: 2020 Acura Sports Car Challenge at Mid-Ohio	2020 season	Next race: 2020 MOTUL Petit Le Mans
