= Pratt Miller =

American industrial company

- Type: Subsidiary
- Industry: Automotive, Arms industry
- Founded: 1989; 35 years ago (as Pratt & Miller)
- Founder: Gary Pratt; Jim Miller
- Headquarters: 29600 W. K. Smith Drive, New Hudson, Michigan, US
- Key people: Matt Carroll (CEO)
- Products: Corvette Racing; Robotics; Race Parts; Chassis Parts; Body Parts
- Parent: Oshkosh Corporation (2020–present)
- Divisions: Pratt Miller Motorsports
- Website: https://www.prattmiller.com/

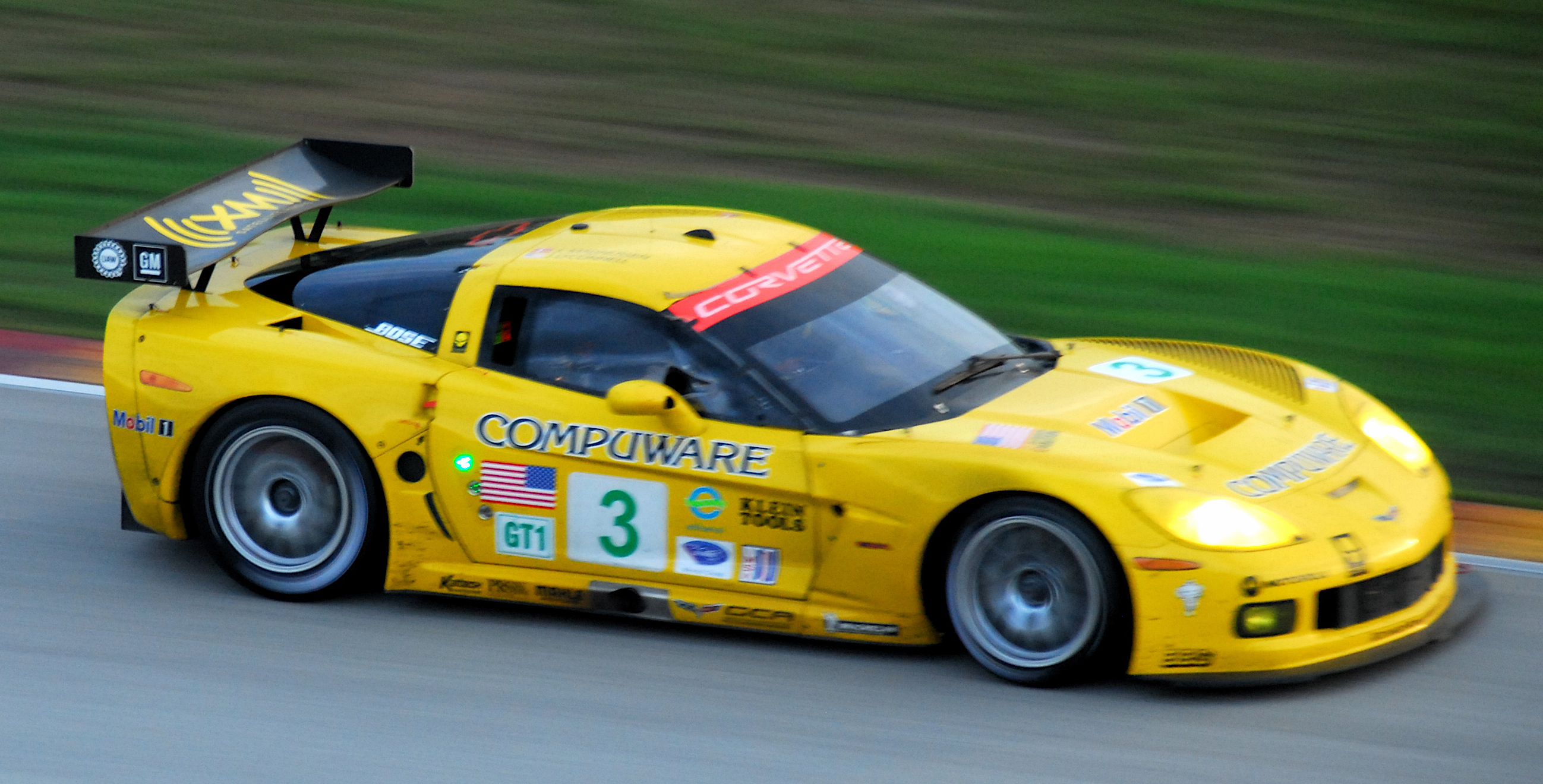
A Chevrolet Corvette C6.R.

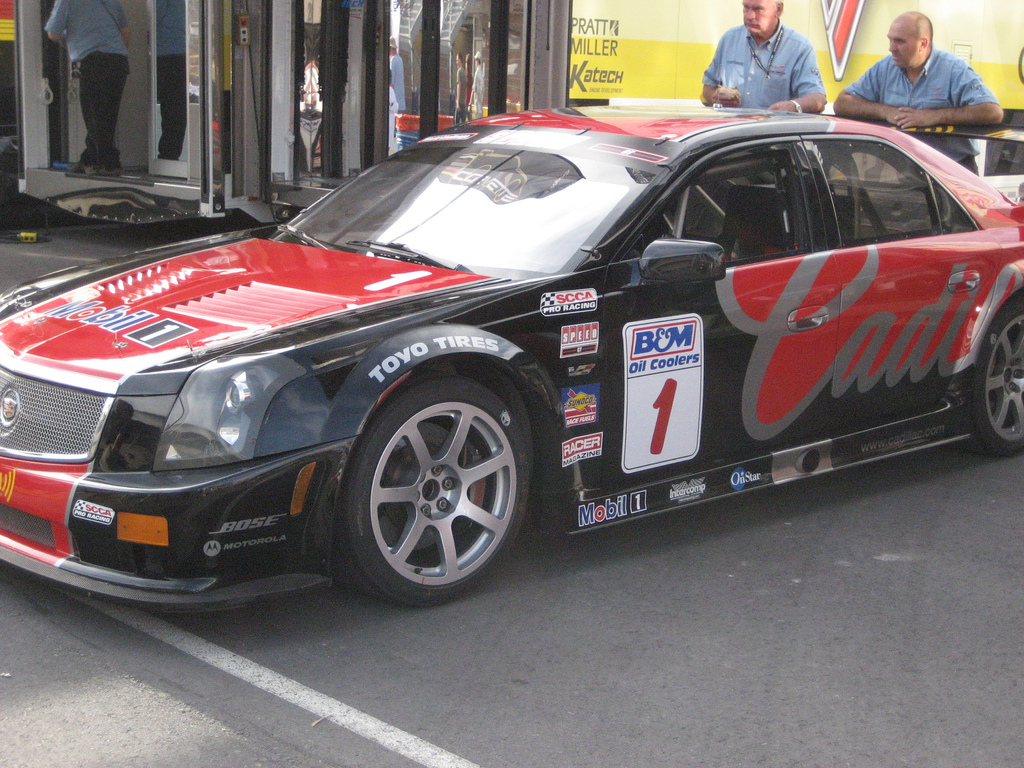
A Cadillac CTS-V.

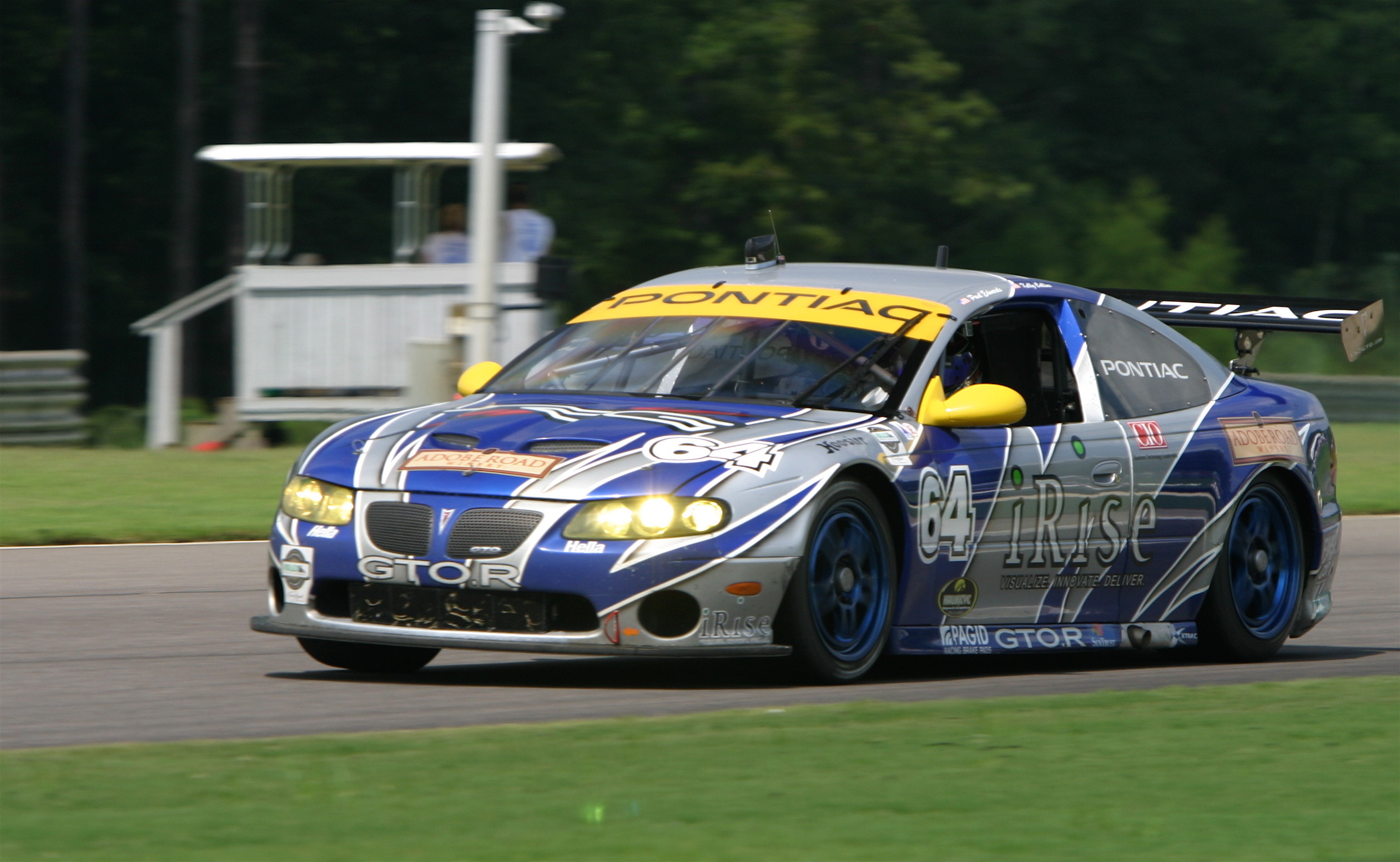
A Pontiac GTO.R.

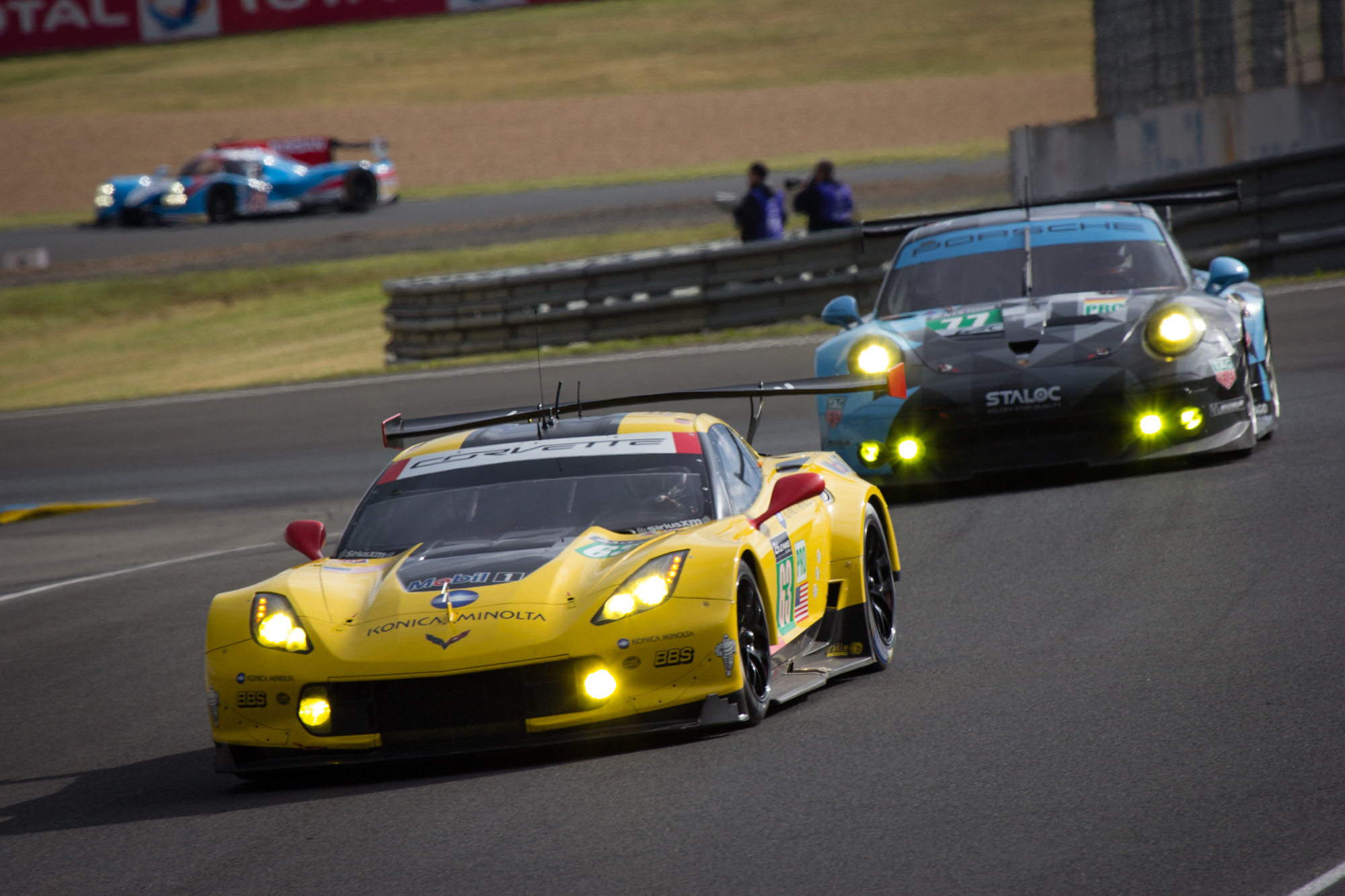
A Chevrolet Corvette C7.R

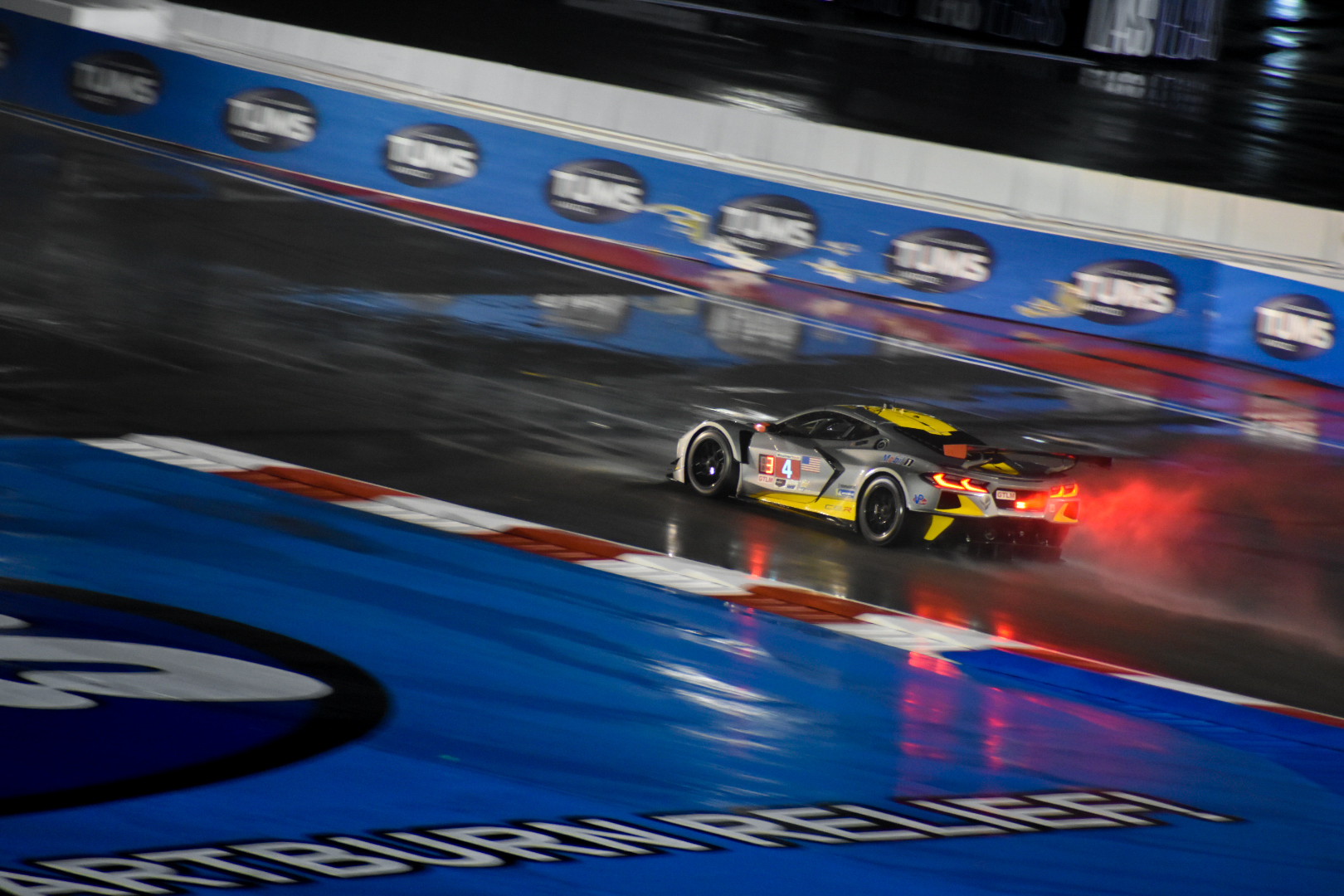
A Chevrolet Corvette C8.R

Pratt Miller Engineering, formerly known as Pratt & Miller, is an American company involved in the automotive and arms industries. It was founded by Gary Pratt and Jim Miller in 1989. A defense division was added in 2013 and the company was acquired by Oshkosh Corporation in 2020. The company is headquartered in the unincorporated community of New Hudson, in Lyon Township, Oakland County, Michigan. They are best known as service providers for many of General Motors' motorsports programs, including the operation of the Corvette Racing team and their own Pratt Miller Motorsports.

== History ==
Pratt Miller Engineering is an American engineering and product development company specializing in high-performance automotive engineering, defense technology, and advanced mobility solutions. Founded by Gary Pratt and Jim Miller in 1989 and acquired by Oshkosh Corporation in 2020, the company operates from New Hudson, Michigan, serving clients across commercial, defense, and motorsports sectors. The company is organized into three distinct business units:

Pratt Miller Motorsports provides engineering services and operates racing programs primarily for General Motors brands, including the legendary Corvette Racing team. The division also competes independently in IMSA competitions and holds an FIA constructor license to build Corvette Z06 GT3.R customer race cars.

Pratt Miller Defense develops advanced military systems including robotic platforms, autonomous vehicles, and live-fire training systems. Established in 2013, the defense division applies motorsports-derived engineering methodologies to solve complex challenges in lightweighting, survivability, and rapid prototyping for U.S. military applications.

Pratt Miller Mobility focuses on transforming the mobility industry through high performance vehicle development, electrification, prototyping, artificial intelligence integration, connected vehicle systems, and autonomous technology development. This division serves clients in high performance, commercial trucking, agriculture, powersports, and emerging mobility sectors.

One of the company's first products was the Intrepid RM-1 GTP car, built in 1991.

Pratt Miller developed a road-going tuned version of the Chevrolet Corvette C6 named C6RS. The C6RS was powered by a 500 cubic inch LS-based engine developed and built by Katech Inc.

== Motorsports ventures ==
=== NASCAR ===
Pratt Miller's work in NASCAR includes engineering support for the Chevrolet teams as well contributing to vehicle design and performance enhancements that have helped multiple teams. Their efforts have contributed to 276 NASCAR Cup Series race wins, 222 NASCAR Xfinity Series race wins, and 152 NASCAR Craftsman Truck Series race wins. Additionally, Pratt Miller has helped contribute to 27 combined manufacturer championships and 28 driver championships across NASCAR's top three series; NASCAR Cup Series, NASCAR Xfinity Series, and NASCAR Craftsman Truck Series.

=== IndyCar Series ===
In the IndyCar Series, Pratt Miller played a large role in developing Chevrolet's Aero Kits, which helped improve the aerodynamic performance of Chevrolet-powered cars. This development work has helped benefit Chevrolet's competitive presence in the series, contributing to 106 IndyCar race wins and 4 Indy 500 victories. Pratt Miller has also helped contribute to 7 driver championships and 7 manufacturer championships in IndyCar.

=== SportsCar racing ===
Pratt Miller is most commonly known for its work with Corvette Racing in the IMSA SportsCar Championship and the FIA World Endurance Championship (WEC). Corvette Racing has achieved numerous victories and championships under Pratt Miller's technical leadership, including class wins at the 24 Hours of Le Mans, the Rolex 24 at Daytona, and multiple American Le Mans Series championships. Additionally, Pratt Miller has contributed to 27 Cadillac Daytona Prototype race wins.

Pratt Miller Motorsports, the motorsports division of Pratt Miller, began working independently in 2024 and currently competes in the LMP2 and GTD Pro classes of the IMSA SportsCar Championship fielding the Oreca 07 and Chevrolet Corvette Z06 GT3.R. Additionally, Pratt Miller holds an FIA constructor license and builds all of the Corvette Z06 GT3.R customer cars, which is a first for GM as 20 cars will be built between 2024 and 2025 and will compete in series all over the world.

== Other ventures ==
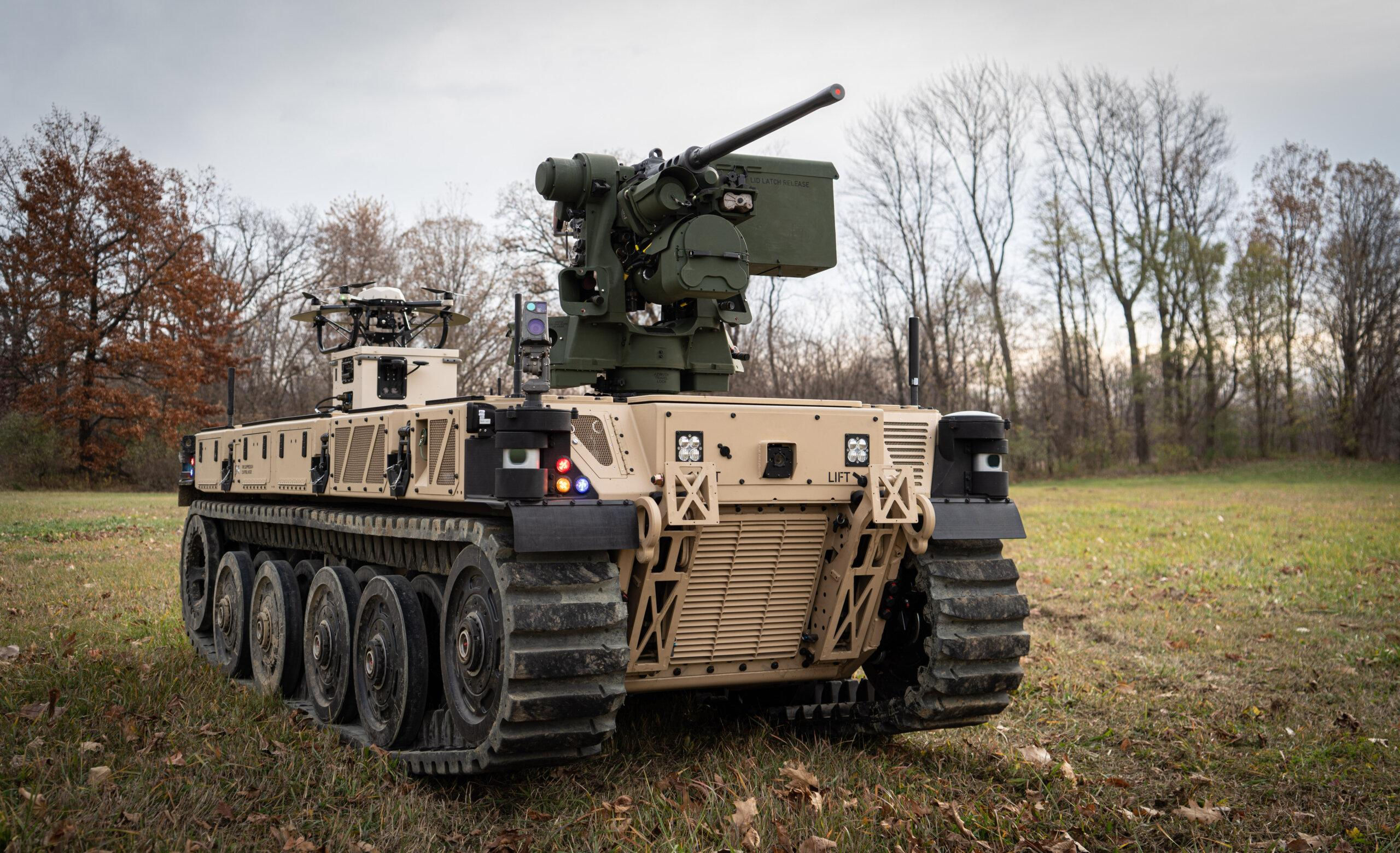
An Expeditionary Modular Autonomous Vehicle (EMAV) manufactured by Pratt Miller

In recent years, Pratt Miller has expanded its capabilities as a result of its acquisition by the Oshkosh Corporation. The company has expanded into both the automotive and defense sectors. Additionally, the company has invested in advanced simulation technologies, such as the Driver-in-the-Loop simulator, to enhance their engineering and testing capabilities.

== Cars ==
- Intrepid RM-1 (GTP)
- Chevrolet Camaro 1995-96 (SCCA Trans-Am)
- Chevrolet Corvette C5-R (GTS/GT1)
- Pontiac GTO.Rs (Grand-Am GT)
- Pontiac GXP.Rs (Grand-Am GT)
- Chevrolet Camaro GT (Grand-Am GT)
- Cadillac CTS-V.R (Pirelli World Challenge GT)
- Chevrolet Corvette C6.R (GT1, GT2/LM GTE)
- Cadillac ATS-V.R GT3 (Pirelli World Challenge GT)
- Chevrolet Corvette C7.R (IMSA GTLM and LM GTE)
- Chevrolet Corvette C8.R (IMSA GTLM, GTD Pro and LM GTE)
- Chevrolet Corvette Z06 GT3.R (IMSA GTD Pro, GTD, LM GT3 and GT World Challenge America)

== See also ==
- Pratt Miller Motorsports
- Corvette Racing
