= Ian James (racing driver) =

British-American racing driver

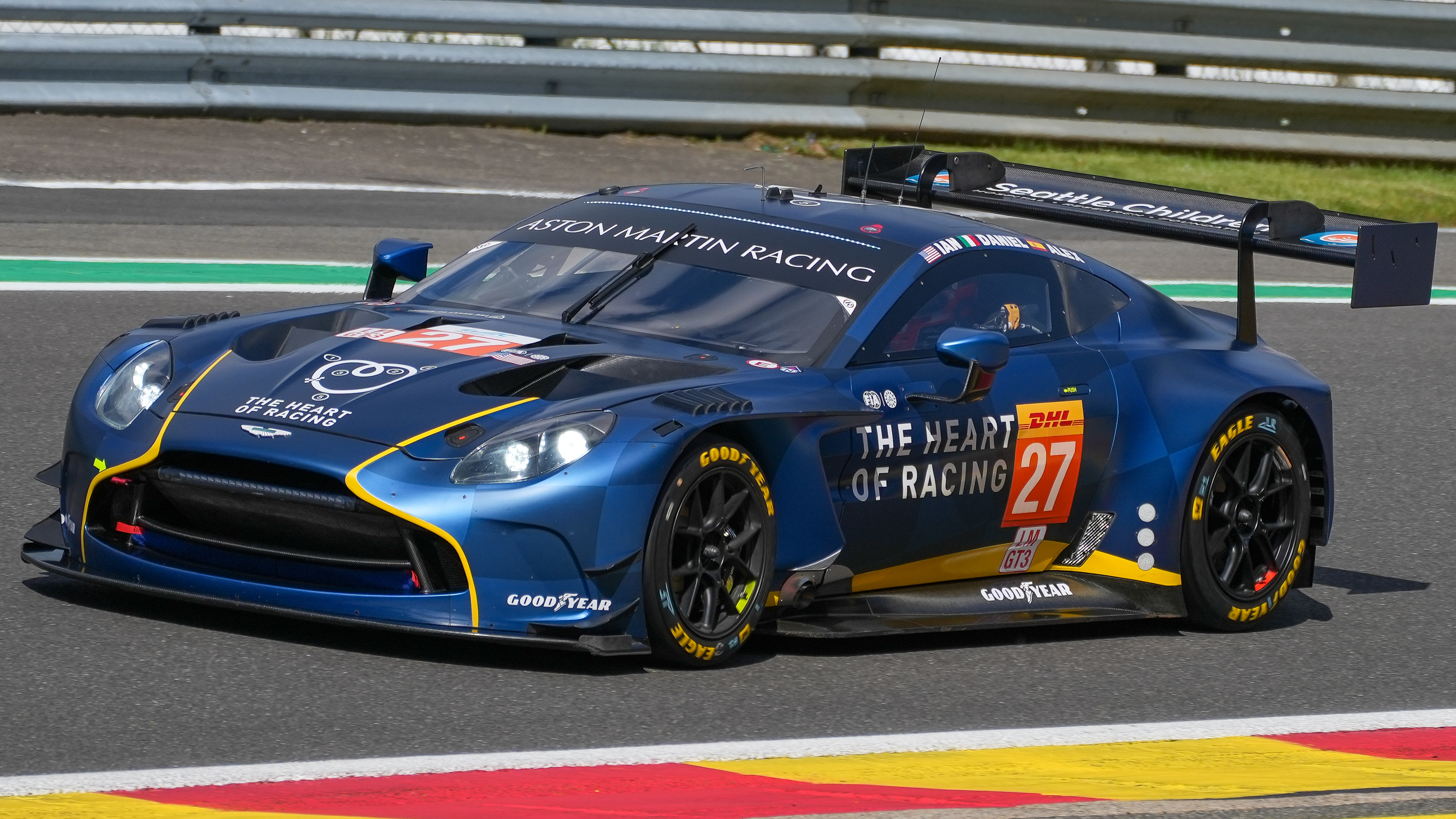
- Nationality: (United Kingdom) British
- Born: July 22, 1974 (age 52) Epsom, Surrey, England

IMSA SportsCar Championship career
- Debut season: 2014
- Current team: Heart of Racing Team
- Categorisation: FIA Gold (until 2014); FIA Silver (2015–2022); FIA Bronze (2023–)
- Former teams: 3GT Racing, Team Seattle
- Starts: 52
- Championships: 0
- Wins: 5
- Podiums: 15
- Best finish: 4th in 2015

Previous series
- American Le Mans Series; Rolex Sports Car Series

Ian James (born 22 July 1974 in Epsom) is a British-American racing driver and principal of the Heart of Racing Team, competing in the IMSA SportsCar Championship. James has 11 total sportscar wins.

In 2004, James had a class victory (LMP2) at the 2004 12 Hours of Sebring and won the LMP2 driving title in the 2004 American Le Mans Series.

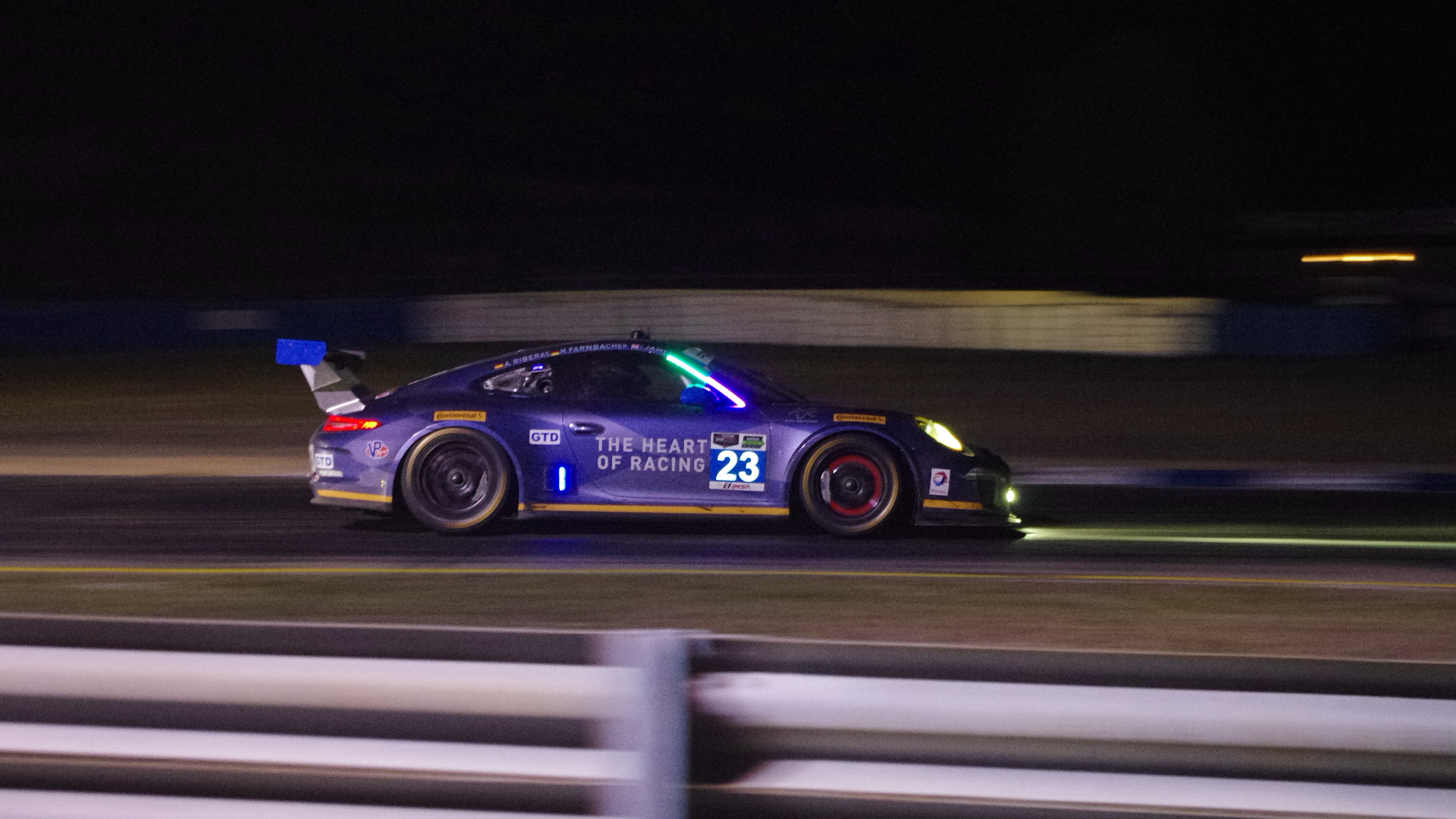
James competing in the 2014 12 Hours of Sebring

In 2015, James had a class victory (GTD) at the 2015 12 Hours of Sebring.

In 2020, James founded the Heart of Racing Team.

In 2023, James not only won the GTD class at the 2023 24 Hours of Daytona, but was the top GTD performer, beating out the more highly structured GTD Pro teams. This win was the first for Aston Martin at the 24 Hours of Daytona, 59 years after their first attempt.

== Racing record ==
=== Career summary ===
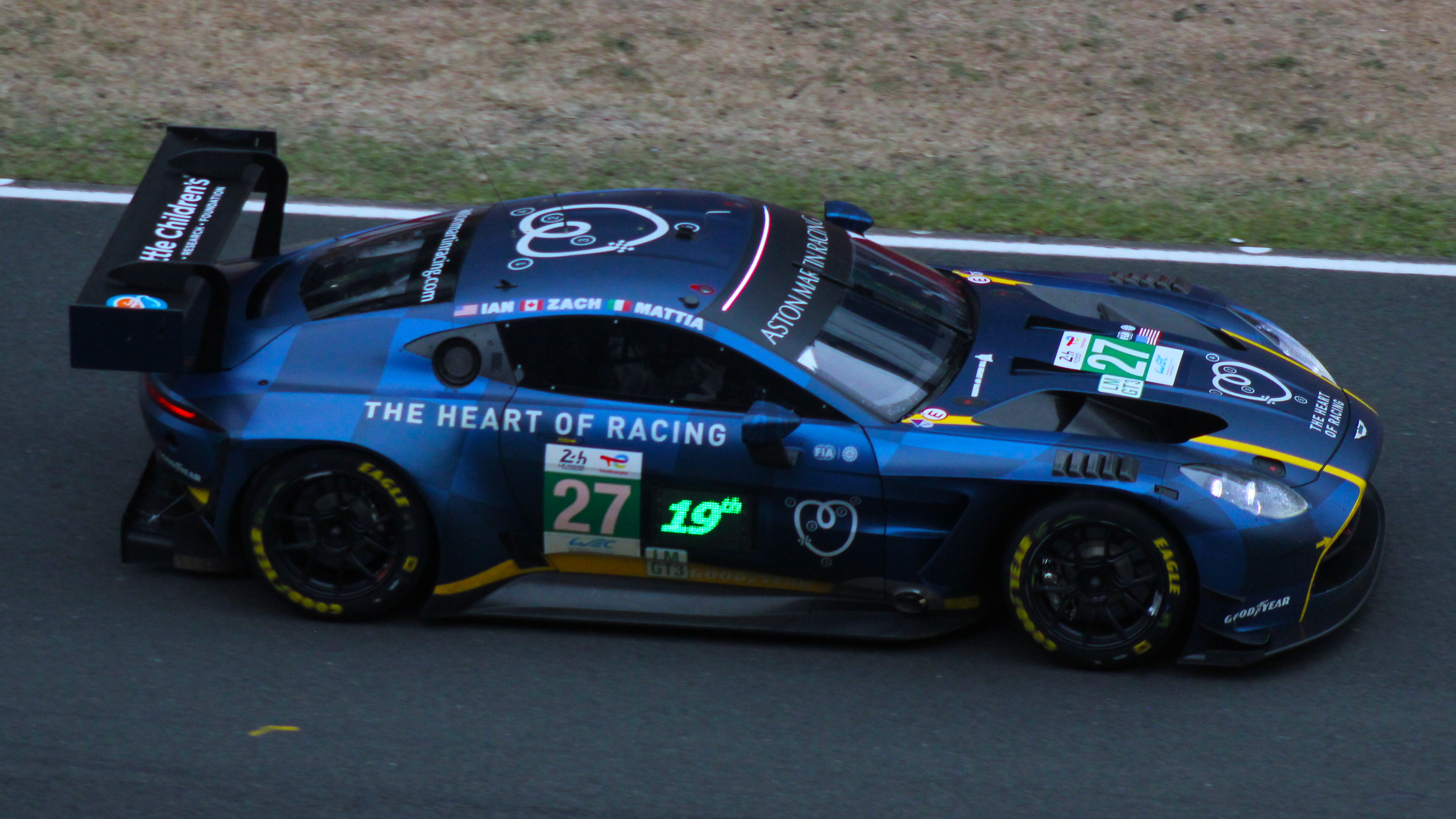
James' No. 27 car at the 2025 24 Hours of Le Mans

Season	Series	Team	Races	Wins	Poles	F/Laps	Podiums	Points	Position
2000	American Le Mans Series - GT	Michael Colucci Racing/ Nygmatech	2	0	0	0	0	27	39th
2003	American Le Mans Series - LMP900	Sezio Florida Racing Team	1	0	0	0	0	0	NC
2004	American Le Mans Series - LMP2	Miracle Motorsports	9	3	0	0	8	143	1st
2005	American Le Mans Series - LMP2	Miracle Motorsports	1	1	0	0	1	26	8th
2006	American Le Mans Series - GT2	BMW Team PTG	2	0	0	0	0	8	45th
2007	American Le Mans Series - GT2	Tafel Racing	1	0	0	0	0	14	36th
2009	American Le Mans Series - GT2	Panoz Team PTG	10	0	0	0	2	95	8th
2011	American Le Mans Series - GT	Panoz Racing	1	0	0	0	0	0	NC
2011	American Le Mans Series - GT	JaguarRSR	1	0	0	0	0	0	NC
2014	United SportsCar Championship - GTD	Team Seattle	11	0	0	0	2	234	15th
2015	United SportsCar Championship - GTD	Team Seattle	10	2	0	0	4	267	4th
2016	IMSA SportsCar Championship - GTD	Team Seattle	4	0	0	0	1	27	42nd
2017	IMSA SportsCar Championship - GTD	3GT Racing	3	0	0	0	0	38	51st
2017	24H Series - SP3-GT4	Rotek Racing	1	0	0	0	0	12	10th
2017	24H Series - SP3-GT4	Brookspeed International Motorsport	1	0	0	0	0	12	10th
2018	24H GT Series - GT4	Brookspeed International Motorsport							
2019	IMSA SportsCar Championship - GTD	Audi Sport Team WRT Speedstar	1	0	0	0	1	30	47th
2020	IMSA SportsCar Championship - GTD	Heart of Racing Team	9	0	0	0	2	199	15th
2021	IMSA SportsCar Championship - GTD	Heart of Racing Team	7	1	0	0	3	1949	12th
2021	24H GT Series - GT4	Heart of Racing Team							
2022	IMSA SportsCar Championship - GTD	Heart of Racing Team	4	0	0	0	1	1048	25th
2022	24H GT Series - GT4	Heart of Racing Team							
2022–23	Middle East Trophy - GT3	Heart of Racing Team by SPS							
2023	IMSA SportsCar Championship - GTD	Heart of Racing Team	4	1	1	0	1	1125	23rd
2023	FIA World Endurance Championship - LMGTE Am	Northwest AMR	4	0	0	0	1	51	9th
2023	24 Hours of Le Mans - LMGTE Am	Northwest AMR	1	0	0	0	0	N/A	6th
2023	24H GT Series - GT3	Heart of Racing by SPS							
2024	IMSA SportsCar Championship - GTD	Heart of Racing Team	2	0	0	0	0	395*	15th*
2024	FIA World Endurance Championship - LMGT3	Heart of Racing Team	1	0	0	0	1	27*	2nd*
2024	24H Series - GT3	Heart of Racing by SPS							
2024	Intercontinental GT Challenge	Heart of Racing by SPS							
2024	Le Mans Cup - GT3	Heart of Racing by SPS							
2024	GT World Challenge Europe Endurance Cup	CrowdStrike Racing by Riley	1	0	0	0	0	0	NC
2025	Middle East Trophy - GT3	Heart of Racing by SPS							
2025	24H Series - GT3	Heart of Racing by SPS							
2025	FIA World Endurance Championship - LMGT3	Heart of Racing Team	8	0	1	0	1	86	4th
2025	GT World Challenge Europe Endurance Cup	CrowdStrike by SPS	1	0	0	0	0	0	NC
2026	FIA World Endurance Championship - LMGT3	Heart of Racing Team							
2026–27	Asian Le Mans Series – GT3	Heart of Racing Team						*	*

=== Complete American Le Mans Series results ===
(key) (Races in bold indicate pole position)

Year	Team	Class	Make	Engine	1	2	3	4	5	6	7	8	9	10	11	12	Rank	Points	Ref
2000	Michael Colucci Racing/ Nygmatech	GT	Porsche 911 GT3-R	Porsche 3.6 L Flat-6	SEB; 7	CHA; 11	SIL	NÜR	SON	MOS	TEX	ROS	PET	MON	LSV		39th	27	
2003	Sezio Florida Racing Team	LMP900	Norma M2000	Ford (Kinetic) 6.0 L V8	SEB; 10	ATL	SON	TRO	MOS	AME	MON	MIA	PET				NC	0	
2004	Miracle Motorsports	LMP2	Courage C65	MG (AER) XP20 2.0L Turbo I4	SEB; 1	MID; 3	LIM; 1	SON; 2	POR; 2	MOS; 2	AME; 1	PET; 4	MON; 3†				1st	143	
2005	Miracle Motorsports	LMP2	Courage C65	AER P07 2.0 L Turbo I4	SEB; 1	ATL	MID	LIM	SON	POR	AME	MOS	PET	MON			8th	26	
2006	BMW Team PTG	GT2	BMW M3	BMW 3.4L I6	SEB; 13	HOU	MDO	LRP	UTA	POR	ELK	MOS	PET; 9†	LAG			45th	8	
2007	Tafel Racing	GT2	Porsche 997 GT3-RSR	Porsche 3.8L Flat-6	SEB; 5	STP	LBH	HOU	UTA	LRP	MDO	ELK	MOS	DET	PET	LAG	36th	14	
2009	Panoz Team PTG	GT2	Panoz Esperante GT-LM	Ford 5.0 L V8	SEB; 3	STP; 3	LBH; 6	UTA; 4	LRP; 6	MDO; 7	ELK; 11	MOS; 6	PET; 9	LAG; 4			8th	95	
2011	Panoz Racing	GT	Panoz Abruzzi	Chevrolet 6.5 L V8	SEB; 18	LBH	LRP	MOS	MDO	ELK	BAL	LAG	PET				NC	0	
2011	JaguarRSR	GT	Jaguar XKR GT	Jaguar 5.0 L V8	SEB	LBH	LRP	MOS	MDO	ELK	BAL	LAG	PET; 16				NC	0	
2011	Panoz Racing	NC	Panoz Abruzzi	Chevrolet 6.5 L V8	SEB	LBH	LRP	MOS; 1	MDO	ELK	BAL	LAG	PET				NC	0	

^{†} Did not finish the race but was classified as his car completed more than 70% of the overall winner's race distance.

=== Complete WeatherTech SportsCar Championship results ===
(key) (Races in bold indicate pole position)

Year	Team	Class	Make	Engine	1	2	3	4	5	6	7	8	9	10	11	12	Rank	Points	Ref
2014	Team Seattle	GTD	Porsche 911 GT America	Porsche 4.0 L Flat-6	DAY; 15	SEB; 3	LGA; 8	DET; 2	WGL; 16	MOS; 6	IMS; 6†	ELK; 6	VIR; 15	COA; 18	PET; 5		15th	234	
2015	Team Seattle	GTD	Porsche 911 GT America	Porsche 4.0 L Flat-6	DAY; 18	SEB; 1	LGA; 3	DET; 1	WGL; 7	LIM; 4	ELK; 8	VIR; 3	COA; 4	PET; 7			4th	267	
2016	Team Seattle	GTD	Porsche 911 GT3 R	Porsche 4.0 L Flat-6	DAY; 8	SEB; 4†	LGA	BEL	**WGL**; 3†	MOS	LIM	ELK	VIR	AUS	PET; 8†		42nd	27	
2017	3GT Racing	GTD	Lexus RC F GT3	Lexus 5.0 L V8	DAY; 27	SEB; 18	LBH	AUS	BEL	WGL	MOS	LIM	ELK	VIR	LGA	PET; 10	51st	38	
2019	Audi Sport Team WRT Speedstar	GTD	Audi R8 LMS Evo	Audi 5.2 L V10	DAY; 3	SEB	MDO	DET	WGL	MOS	LIM	ELK	VIR	LGA	PET		47th	30	
2020	Heart of Racing	GTD	Aston Martin Vantage AMR GT3	Aston Martin 4.0 L Turbo V8	DAY; 18	DAY	SEB	ELK; DNS	VIR; 8	ATL; 6	MDO; 4	CLT; 3	PET; 11	LGA; 4	SEB; 2		15th	199	
2021	Heart of Racing	GTD	Aston Martin Vantage AMR GT3	Aston Martin 4.0 L Turbo V8	DAY; 5	SEB; 3	MDO	DET	WGL; 3	WGL	LIM	ELK	LGA; 12	LBH; 12	VIR; 6	PET; 1	12th	1949	
2022	Heart of Racing Team	GTD	Aston Martin Vantage AMR GT3	Aston Martin 4.0 L Turbo V8	DAY; 9	SEB; 15	LBH	LGA	MDO	DET	WGL; 1	MOS	LIM	ELK	VIR	PET; 7	25th	1048	
2023	Heart of Racing Team	GTD	Aston Martin Vantage AMR GT3	Aston Martin 4.0 L Turbo V8	DAY; 1	SEB; 15	LBH	MON	WGL; 6	MOS	LIM	ELK	VIR	IMS	**PET**; **5**		23rd	1125	
2024	Heart of Racing Team	GTD	Aston Martin Vantage AMR GT3 Evo	Aston Martin 4.0 L Turbo V8	DAY; 22	SEB; 4	LBH	LGA	WGL	MOS	ELK	VIR	IMS	PET			15th*	395*	

^{†} James did not complete sufficient laps in order to score full points.

=== Complete FIA World Endurance Championship results ===
Year	Entrant	Class	Car	Engine	1	2	3	4	5	6	7	8	Rank	Points
2023	Northwest AMR	GTE Am	Aston Martin Vantage AMR	Aston Martin M177 4.0 L Turbo V8	SEB	PRT	SPA; 7	LMS; 6	MNZ	FUJ; 7	BHR; 3		9th	51
2024	Heart of Racing Team	LMGT3	Aston Martin Vantage AMR GT3 Evo	Aston Martin M177 4.0 L Turbo V8	QAT; 2	IMO; 5	SPA; 11	LMS; Ret	SÃO; 2	**COA**; 1	FUJ; 9	BHR; 11	5th	83
2025	Heart of Racing Team	LMGT3	Aston Martin Vantage GT3	Aston Martin M177 4.0 L Turbo V8	QAT; 6	ITA; Ret	SPA; 5	**LMS**; 4	SÃO; 14	COA; 5	FUJ; 7	BHR; 3	4th	86
2026	Heart of Racing Team	LMGT3	Aston Martin Vantage AMR GT3 Evo	Aston Martin M177 4.0 L Turbo V8	IMO; Ret	SPA; 2	**LMS**; Ret	SÃO; 13	COA	FUJ	CAT	MNZ	17th*	19*

* Season still in progress

=== Complete Asian Le Mans Series results ===
(key) (Races in bold indicate pole position) (Races in italics indicate fastest lap)

Year	Team	Class	Car	Engine	1	2	3	4	5	6	Pos.	Points
2026–27	Heart of Racing Team	GT	Aston Martin Vantage AMR GT3 Evo	Aston Martin 4.0 L Turbo V8	LEC; 1; 13	LEC; 2; 3	JER; 1	JER; 2	ALG; 1	ALG; 2	6th*	15*

=== 24 Hours of Le Mans results ===
24 Hours of Le Mans results
Year	Team	Co-Drivers	Car	Class	Laps	Pos.	Class Pos.
2005	(United States) Miracle Motorsports	(United States) John Macaluso (United States) Andy Lally	Courage C65-AER	LMP2	115	DNF	DNF
2006	(United States) Miracle Motorsports	(United States) John Macaluso (United States) Andy Lally	Courage C65-AER	LMP2	324	14th	**3rd**
2023	(Canada) Northwest AMR	(Italy) Daniel Mancinelli (Spain) Alex Riberas	Aston Martin Vantage AMR	GTE; Am	310	33rd	6th
2024	(United States) Heart of Racing Team	(Italy) Daniel Mancinelli (Spain) Alex Riberas	Aston Martin Vantage AMR GT3 Evo	LMGT3	196	DNF	DNF
2025	(United States) Heart of Racing Team	(Italy) Mattia Drudi (Canada) Zacharie Robichon	Aston Martin Vantage AMR GT3 Evo	LMGT3	341	36th	4th
2026	(United States) Heart of Racing Team	(Italy) Mattia Drudi (Canada) Zacharie Robichon	Aston Martin Vantage AMR GT3 Evo	LMGT3	291	DNF	DNF

=== 12 Hours of Sebring results ===
Year	Team	Co-drivers	Car	Class	Laps	Pos.	Class Pos.
2000	(United States) Michael Colucci Racing (United States) Nygmatech	(Portugal) João Barbosa (United States) Tim Robertson	Porsche 911 Carrera RSR	GT	276	18th	7th
2003	(United States) Sezio Florida Racing Team	(France) Patrice Roussel (United States) Allen Ziegelman	Norma M2000-Ford	LMP900	71	DNF	DNF
2004	(United States) American Spirit Racing (United States) Miracle Motorsports	(United States) Mike Borkowski (United States) John Macaluso	Lola B2K/40-Nissan	LMP2	264	23rd	1st
2005	(United States) Miracle Motorsports	(United States) Jeff Bucknum (United States) Chris McMurry	Courage C65-AER	LMP2	311	12th	1st
2006	(United States) BMW Team PTG	(United States) Bill Auberlen (United States) Joey Hand	BMW M3 GTR	GT2	197	DNF	DNF
2007	(United States) Tafel Racing	(Germany) Dominik Farnbacher (United States) Jim Tafel	Porsche 997 GT3-RSR	GT2	314	17th	5th
2009	(United States) Panoz Team PTG	(Germany) Dominik Farnbacher	Panoz Esperante GT-LM	GT2	329	10th	3rd
2011	(United States) Panoz Racing	(Switzerland) Benjamin Leuenberger	Panoz Abruzzi	GT	19	DNF	DNF
2014	(United States) Alex Job Racing / Team Seattle	(Germany) Mario Farnbacher (Spain) Alex Riberas	Porsche 911 GT America	GTD	278	25th	3rd
2015	(United States) Alex Job Racing / Team Seattle	(Germany) Mario Farnbacher (Spain) Alex Riberas	Porsche 911 GT America	GTD	318	15th	1st
2016	(United States) Alex Job Racing / Team Seattle	(Germany) Mario Farnbacher (Spain) Alex Riberas	Porsche 911 GT3 R	GTD	229	25th	4th
2017	(United States) 3GT Racing	(United States) Sage Karam (United States) Scott Pruett	Lexus RC F GT3	GTD	269	35th	18th
2020	(United States) Heart of Racing Team	(Canada) Roman De Angelis (United Kingdom) Darren Turner	Aston Martin Vantage AMR GT3	GTD	319	19th	2nd
2021	(United States) Heart of Racing Team	(Canada) Roman De Angelis (United Kingdom) Ross Gunn	Aston Martin Vantage AMR GT3	GTD	320	20th	3rd
2022	(United States) Heart of Racing Team	(Canada) Roman De Angelis (United Kingdom) Tom Gamble	Aston Martin Vantage AMR GT3	GTD	256	43rd	15th
2023	(United States) Heart of Racing Team	(Canada) Roman De Angelis (Denmark) Marco Sørensen	Aston Martin Vantage AMR GT3	GTD	287	DNF	DNF
