= 2011 Baltimore Grand Prix =

The 2011 Baltimore Grand Prix refers to two motorsport events that happened on the same weekend at the street circuit in Baltimore, Maryland:

- 2011 Baltimore Grand Prix (IndyCar), an Indy Car Series race
- 2011 Baltimore Grand Prix (ALMS), an American Le Mans Series race
