= 2011 American Le Mans Monterey =

Track map of Mazda Raceway Laguna Seca

The 2011 ModSpace American Le Mans Monterey presented by Patrón was held at Mazda Raceway Laguna Seca on September 17, 2011. It was the eighth round of the 2011 American Le Mans Series season. The event also marked the first time since the 1999 event to have two sponsors in the event title.

== Qualifying ==
=== Qualifying result ===
Pole position winners in each class are marked in bold.

| Pos | Class | Team | Driver | Lap Time | Grid |
|---|---|---|---|---|---|
| 1 | **LMP1** | **#16 Dyson Racing Team** | **Guy Smith** | **1:13.927** | **1** |
| 2 | LMP1 | #20 Oryx Dyson Racing | Steven Kane | 1:14.621 | 2 |
| 3 | LMP1 | #007 Aston Martin Racing | Adrián Fernández | 1:14.827 | 3 |
| 4 | LMP1 | #6 Muscle Milk Aston Martin Racing | Klaus Graf | 1:15.564 | 4 |
| 5 | **LMP2** | **#055 Level 5 Motorsports** | **Christophe Bouchut** | **1:16.688** | **5** |
| 6 | LMP1 | #12 Autocon | Tony Burgess | 1:18.379 | 6 |
| 7 | **LMPC** | **#89 Intersport Racing** | **Kyle Marcelli** | **1:18.844** | **7** |
| 8 | LMPC | #06 CORE Autosport | Gunnar Jeannette | 1:19.238 | 8 |
| 9 | LMPC | #63 Genoa Racing | Eric Lux | 1:19.423 | 9 |
| 10 | LMPC | #05 CORE Autosport | Andy Wallace | 1:20.028 | 10 |
| 11 | LMPC | #52 PR1 Mathiasen Motorsports | Henri Richard | 1:20.779 | 11 |
| 12 | **GT** | **#56 BMW Team RLL** | **Joey Hand** | **1:22.226** | **12** |
| 13 | GT | #4 Corvette Racing | Oliver Gavin | 1:23.124 | 13 |
| 14 | GT | #55 BMW Team RLL | Bill Auberlen | 1:23.132 | 14 |
| 15 | GT | #02 Extreme Speed Motorsports | Guy Cosmo | 1:23.367 | 15 |
| 16 | GT | #45 Flying Lizard Motorsports | Patrick Long | 1:23.368 | 16 |
| 17 | GT | #01 Extreme Speed Motorsports | Johannes van Overbeek | 1:23.386 | 17 |
| 18 | GT | #62 Risi Competizione | Toni Vilander | 1:23.518 | 18 |
| 19 | GT | #3 Corvette Racing | Olivier Beretta | 1:23.566 | 19 |
| 20 | GT | #17 Team Falken Tire | Bryan Sellers | 1:23.758 | 20 |
| 21 | GT | #48 Paul Miller Racing | Sascha Maassen | 1:24.133 | 21 |
| 22 | GT | #99 JaguarRSR | Kenny Wilden | 1:24.383 | 22 |
| 23 | GT | #44 Flying Lizard Motorsports | Seth Neiman | 1:27.829 | 23 |
| 24 | **GTC** | **#54 Black Swan Racing** | **Jeroen Bleekemolen** | **1:27.850** | **24** |
| 25 | GTC | #34 Green Hornet/Black Swan Racing | Damien Faulkner | 1:28.152 | 25 |
| 26 | GTC | #66 TRG | Spencer Pumpelly | 1:28.386 | 26 |
| 27 | GTC | #30 NGT Motorsport | Martin Ragginger | 1:28.617 | 27 |
| 28 | GTC | #68 TRG | Dion von Moltke | 1:28.796 | 28 |
| 29 | GTC | #11 JDX Racing | Nick Ham | 1:28.870 | 29 |
| 30 | GTC | #23 Alex Job Racing | Shane Lewis | 1:29.194 | 30 |
| 31 | GTC | #32 GMG Racing | James Sofronas | 1:29.334 | 31 |
| 32 | GTC | #31 Competition Motorsports | Cort Wagner | 1:29.532 | 32 |
| 33 | LMPC | #18 Performance Tech Motorsports | Anthony Nicolosi | 10:07.530 | 33 |
| 34 | LMPC | #37 Intersport Racing | No Time | | 34 |
| 35 | GT | #98 JaguarRSR | No Time | | 36 |
| 36 | UNC | #911 Porsche Motorsports North America | No Time | | 35 |

== Race ==
=== Race result ===
Class winners in bold. Cars failing to complete 70% of their class winner's distance are marked as Not Classified (NC).

| Pos | Class | No | Team | Drivers | Chassis | Tire | Laps |
| Pos | Class | No | Team | Drivers | Engine | Tire | Laps |
|---|---|---|---|---|---|---|---|
| 1 | **LMP1** | **007** | **(United Kingdom) Aston Martin Racing** | **(Mexico) Adrián Fernández (Switzerland) Harold Primat (Germany) Stefan Mücke** | **Lola-Aston Martin B09/60** | M | **248** |
| 1 | **LMP1** | **007** | **(United Kingdom) Aston Martin Racing** | **(Mexico) Adrián Fernández (Switzerland) Harold Primat (Germany) Stefan Mücke** | **Aston Martin 6.0 L V12** | M | **248** |
| 2 | LMP1 | 16 | (United States) Dyson Racing Team | (United States) Chris Dyson (United Kingdom) Guy Smith (United States) Jay Cochran | Lola B09/86 | D | 245 |
| 2 | LMP1 | 16 | (United States) Dyson Racing Team | (United States) Chris Dyson (United Kingdom) Guy Smith (United States) Jay Cochran | Mazda MZR-R 2.0 L Turbo I4 (Isobutanol) | D | 245 |
| 3 | LMP1 | 20 | (United States) Oryx Dyson Racing | (United Arab Emirates) Humaid Al Masaood (United Kingdom) Steven Kane (United States) Butch Leitzinger | Lola B09/86 | D | 245 |
| 3 | LMP1 | 20 | (United States) Oryx Dyson Racing | (United Arab Emirates) Humaid Al Masaood (United Kingdom) Steven Kane (United States) Butch Leitzinger | Mazda MZR-R 2.0 L Turbo I4 (Isobutanol) | D | 245 |
| 4 | **LMP2** | **055** | **(United States) Level 5 Motorsports** | **(United States) Scott Tucker (France) Christophe Bouchut (Mexico) Luis Díaz** | **HPD ARX-01g** | M | **241** |
| 4 | **LMP2** | **055** | **(United States) Level 5 Motorsports** | **(United States) Scott Tucker (France) Christophe Bouchut (Mexico) Luis Díaz** | **HPD HR28TT 2.8 L Turbo V6** | M | **241** |
| 5 | **LMPC** | **63** | **(United States) Genoa Racing** | **(United States) Eric Lux (United States) Elton Julian (United States) Michael Guasch** | **Oreca FLM09** | M | **241** |
| 5 | **LMPC** | **63** | **(United States) Genoa Racing** | **(United States) Eric Lux (United States) Elton Julian (United States) Michael Guasch** | **Chevrolet LS3 6.2 L V8** | M | **241** |
| 6 | LMPC | 06 | (United States) CORE Autosport | (United States) Gunnar Jeannette (Mexico) Ricardo González (Mexico) Rudy Junco | Oreca FLM09 | M | 241 |
| 6 | LMPC | 06 | (United States) CORE Autosport | (United States) Gunnar Jeannette (Mexico) Ricardo González (Mexico) Rudy Junco | Chevrolet LS3 6.2 L V8 | M | 241 |
| 7 | LMPC | 89 | (United States) Intersport Racing | (Canada) Kyle Marcelli (United States) Chapman Ducote (United States) David Ducote | Oreca FLM09 | M | 239 |
| 7 | LMPC | 89 | (United States) Intersport Racing | (Canada) Kyle Marcelli (United States) Chapman Ducote (United States) David Ducote | Chevrolet LS3 6.2 L V8 | M | 239 |
| 8 | LMPC | 05 | (United States) CORE Autosport | (United States) Jon Bennett (United States) Frankie Montecalvo (United Kingdom) Andy Wallace | Oreca FLM09 | M | 239 |
| 8 | LMPC | 05 | (United States) CORE Autosport | (United States) Jon Bennett (United States) Frankie Montecalvo (United Kingdom) Andy Wallace | Chevrolet LS3 6.2 L V8 | M | 239 |
| 9 | LMPC | 37 | (United States) Intersport Racing | (Italy) Luca Moro (United States) Tomy Drissi (Puerto Rico) Ricardo Vera | Oreca FLM09 | M | 237 |
| 9 | LMPC | 37 | (United States) Intersport Racing | (Italy) Luca Moro (United States) Tomy Drissi (Puerto Rico) Ricardo Vera | Chevrolet LS3 6.2 L V8 | M | 237 |
| 10 | UNC | 911 | (United States) Porsche Motorsports North America | (France) Romain Dumas (Austria) Richard Lietz | Porsche 997 GT3-R Hybrid | M | 236 |
| 10 | UNC | 911 | (United States) Porsche Motorsports North America | (France) Romain Dumas (Austria) Richard Lietz | Porsche 4.0 L Flat-6 (Hybrid) | M | 236 |
| 11 | **GT** | **45** | **(United States) Flying Lizard Motorsports** | **(Germany) Jörg Bergmeister (United States) Patrick Long** | **Porsche 997 GT3-RSR** | M | **236** |
| 11 | **GT** | **45** | **(United States) Flying Lizard Motorsports** | **(Germany) Jörg Bergmeister (United States) Patrick Long** | **Porsche 4.0 L Flat-6** | M | **236** |
| 12 | GT | 56 | (United States) BMW Team RLL | (Germany) Dirk Müller (United States) Joey Hand | BMW M3 GT2 | D | 236 |
| 12 | GT | 56 | (United States) BMW Team RLL | (Germany) Dirk Müller (United States) Joey Hand | BMW 4.0 L V8 | D | 236 |
| 13 | GT | 01 | (United States) Extreme Speed Motorsports | (United States) Scott Sharp (United States) Johannes van Overbeek | Ferrari 458 Italia GT2 | M | 236 |
| 13 | GT | 01 | (United States) Extreme Speed Motorsports | (United States) Scott Sharp (United States) Johannes van Overbeek | Ferrari 4.5 L V8 | M | 236 |
| 14 | GT | 55 | (United States) BMW Team RLL | (United States) Bill Auberlen (Germany) Dirk Werner | BMW M3 GT2 | D | 236 |
| 14 | GT | 55 | (United States) BMW Team RLL | (United States) Bill Auberlen (Germany) Dirk Werner | BMW 4.0 L V8 | D | 236 |
| 15 | GT | 4 | (United States) Corvette Racing | (United Kingdom) Oliver Gavin (Denmark) Jan Magnussen | Chevrolet Corvette C6.R | M | 236 |
| 15 | GT | 4 | (United States) Corvette Racing | (United Kingdom) Oliver Gavin (Denmark) Jan Magnussen | Chevrolet 5.5 L V8 | M | 236 |
| 16 | GT | 62 | (United States) Risi Competizione | (Brazil) Jaime Melo (Finland) Toni Vilander | Ferrari 458 Italia GT2 | M | 236 |
| 16 | GT | 62 | (United States) Risi Competizione | (Brazil) Jaime Melo (Finland) Toni Vilander | Ferrari 4.5 L V8 | M | 236 |
| 17 | LMPC | 18 | (United States) Performance Tech Motorsports | (United States) Anthony Nicolosi (United States) Jarrett Boon (Germany) Jan-Dirk Lueders | Oreca FLM09 | M | 235 |
| 17 | LMPC | 18 | (United States) Performance Tech Motorsports | (United States) Anthony Nicolosi (United States) Jarrett Boon (Germany) Jan-Dirk Lueders | Chevrolet LS3 6.2 L V8 | M | 235 |
| 18 | GT | 3 | (United States) Corvette Racing | (Monaco) Olivier Beretta (United States) Tommy Milner | Chevrolet Corvette C6.R | M | 235 |
| 18 | GT | 3 | (United States) Corvette Racing | (Monaco) Olivier Beretta (United States) Tommy Milner | Chevrolet 5.5 L V8 | M | 235 |
| 19 | LMPC | 52 | (United States) PR1 Mathiasen Motorsports | (United States) Ken Dobson (United States) Henri Richard (United States) Rene Villeneuve | Oreca FLM09 | M | 232 |
| 19 | LMPC | 52 | (United States) PR1 Mathiasen Motorsports | (United States) Ken Dobson (United States) Henri Richard (United States) Rene Villeneuve | Chevrolet LS3 6.2 L V8 | M | 232 |
| 20 | GT | 02 | (United States) Extreme Speed Motorsports | (United States) Ed Brown (United States) Guy Cosmo | Ferrari 458 Italia GT2 | M | 231 |
| 20 | GT | 02 | (United States) Extreme Speed Motorsports | (United States) Ed Brown (United States) Guy Cosmo | Ferrari 4.5 L V8 | M | 231 |
| 21 | GT | 44 | (United States) Flying Lizard Motorsports | (United States) Seth Neiman (Germany) Marco Holzer | Porsche 997 GT3-RSR | M | 230 |
| 21 | GT | 44 | (United States) Flying Lizard Motorsports | (United States) Seth Neiman (Germany) Marco Holzer | Porsche 4.0 L Flat-6 | M | 230 |
| 22 | GT | 48 | (United States) Paul Miller Racing | (United States) Bryce Miller (Germany) Sascha Maassen | Porsche 997 GT3-RSR | Y | 224 |
| 22 | GT | 48 | (United States) Paul Miller Racing | (United States) Bryce Miller (Germany) Sascha Maassen | Porsche 4.0 L Flat-6 | Y | 224 |
| 23 | **GTC** | **66** | **(United States) TRG** | **(United States) Duncan Ende (United States) Spencer Pumpelly (United States) Peter Ludwig** | **Porsche 997 GT3 Cup** | Y | **222** |
| 23 | **GTC** | **66** | **(United States) TRG** | **(United States) Duncan Ende (United States) Spencer Pumpelly (United States) Peter Ludwig** | **Porsche 4.0 L Flat-6** | Y | **222** |
| 24 | GTC | 54 | (United States) Black Swan Racing | (United States) Tim Pappas (Netherlands) Jeroen Bleekemolen (Netherlands) Sebastiaan Bleekemolen | Porsche 997 GT3 Cup | Y | 222 |
| 24 | GTC | 54 | (United States) Black Swan Racing | (United States) Tim Pappas (Netherlands) Jeroen Bleekemolen (Netherlands) Sebastiaan Bleekemolen | Porsche 4.0 L Flat-6 | Y | 222 |
| 25 | GTC | 34 | (United States) Green Hornet (United States) Black Swan Racing | (United States) Peter LeSaffre (Republic of Ireland) Damien Faulkner | Porsche 997 GT3 Cup | Y | 221 |
| 25 | GTC | 34 | (United States) Green Hornet (United States) Black Swan Racing | (United States) Peter LeSaffre (Republic of Ireland) Damien Faulkner | Porsche 4.0 L Flat-6 | Y | 221 |
| 26 DNF | LMP1 | 12 | (United States) Autocon | (Canada) Tony Burgess (United States) Chris McMurry (United States) Bryan Willman | Lola B06/10 | D | 220 |
| 26 DNF | LMP1 | 12 | (United States) Autocon | (Canada) Tony Burgess (United States) Chris McMurry (United States) Bryan Willman | AER P32C 4.0 L Turbo V8 (Isobutanol) | D | 220 |
| 27 | GTC | 23 | (United States) Alex Job Racing | (United States) Bill Sweedler (United States) Brian Wong (United States) Shane Lewis | Porsche 997 GT3 Cup | Y | 220 |
| 27 | GTC | 23 | (United States) Alex Job Racing | (United States) Bill Sweedler (United States) Brian Wong (United States) Shane Lewis | Porsche 4.0 L Flat-6 | Y | 220 |
| 28 | GTC | 32 | (United States) GMG Racing | (United States) James Sofronas (United States) Alex Welch | Porsche 997 GT3 Cup | Y | 220 |
| 28 | GTC | 32 | (United States) GMG Racing | (United States) James Sofronas (United States) Alex Welch | Porsche 4.0 L Flat-6 | Y | 220 |
| 29 | GTC | 68 | (United States) TRG | (United States) Kevin Buckler (Venezuela) Emilio Di Guida (South Africa) Dion von Moltke | Porsche 997 GT3 Cup | Y | 216 |
| 29 | GTC | 68 | (United States) TRG | (United States) Kevin Buckler (Venezuela) Emilio Di Guida (South Africa) Dion von Moltke | Porsche 4.0 L Flat-6 | Y | 216 |
| 30 | GTC | 30 | (United States) NGT Motorsports | (Austria) Martin Ragginger (United States) Carlos Kauffman (United States) Henrique Cisneros | Porsche 997 GT3 Cup | Y | 215 |
| 30 | GTC | 30 | (United States) NGT Motorsports | (Austria) Martin Ragginger (United States) Carlos Kauffman (United States) Henrique Cisneros | Porsche 4.0 L Flat-6 | Y | 215 |
| 31 | GTC | 11 | (United States) JDX Racing | (United States) Nick Ham (United States) Chris Thompson (United States) Scott Blackett | Porsche 997 GT3 Cup | Y | 213 |
| 31 | GTC | 11 | (United States) JDX Racing | (United States) Nick Ham (United States) Chris Thompson (United States) Scott Blackett | Porsche 4.0 L Flat-6 | Y | 213 |
| 32 | LMP1 | 6 | (United States) Muscle Milk Aston Martin Racing | (Germany) Lucas Luhr (Germany) Klaus Graf | Lola-Aston Martin B08/62 | M | 200 |
| 32 | LMP1 | 6 | (United States) Muscle Milk Aston Martin Racing | (Germany) Lucas Luhr (Germany) Klaus Graf | Aston Martin 6.0 L V12 | M | 200 |
| 33 DNF | GT | 99 | (United States) JaguarRSR | (Brazil) Bruno Junqueira (Canada) Kenny Wilden | Jaguar XKR GT | D | 186 |
| 33 DNF | GT | 99 | (United States) JaguarRSR | (Brazil) Bruno Junqueira (Canada) Kenny Wilden | Jaguar 5.0 L V8 | D | 186 |
| 34 DNF | GT | 17 | (United States) Team Falken Tire | (Germany) Wolf Henzler (United States) Bryan Sellers | Porsche 997 GT3-RSR | F | 101 |
| 34 DNF | GT | 17 | (United States) Team Falken Tire | (Germany) Wolf Henzler (United States) Bryan Sellers | Porsche 4.0 L Flat-6 | F | 101 |
| 35 DNF | GTC | 31 | (United States) Competition Motorsports | (United States) Michael Avenatti (United States) Bob Faieta (United States) Cort Wagner | Porsche 997 GT3 Cup | Y | 98 |
| 35 DNF | GTC | 31 | (United States) Competition Motorsports | (United States) Michael Avenatti (United States) Bob Faieta (United States) Cort Wagner | Porsche 4.0 L Flat-6 | Y | 98 |
| 36 DNF | GT | 98 | (United States) JaguarRSR | (United States) P. J. Jones (United States) Rocky Moran, Jr. | Jaguar XKR GT | D | 5 |
| 36 DNF | GT | 98 | (United States) JaguarRSR | (United States) P. J. Jones (United States) Rocky Moran, Jr. | Jaguar 5.0 L V8 | D | 5 |

American Le Mans Series
| Previous race: Baltimore Grand Prix | 2011 season | Next race: Petit Le Mans |
