= 2011 Petit Le Mans =

Sportscar endurance race in Georgia, US

The Track map of Road Atlanta

The 2011 Petit Le Mans powered by Mazda was held at Road Atlanta on October 1, 2011. It was the ninth and final round of the 2011 American Le Mans Series season and the sixth and penultimate round of the 2011 Intercontinental Le Mans Cup.

== Qualifying ==
=== Qualifying result ===
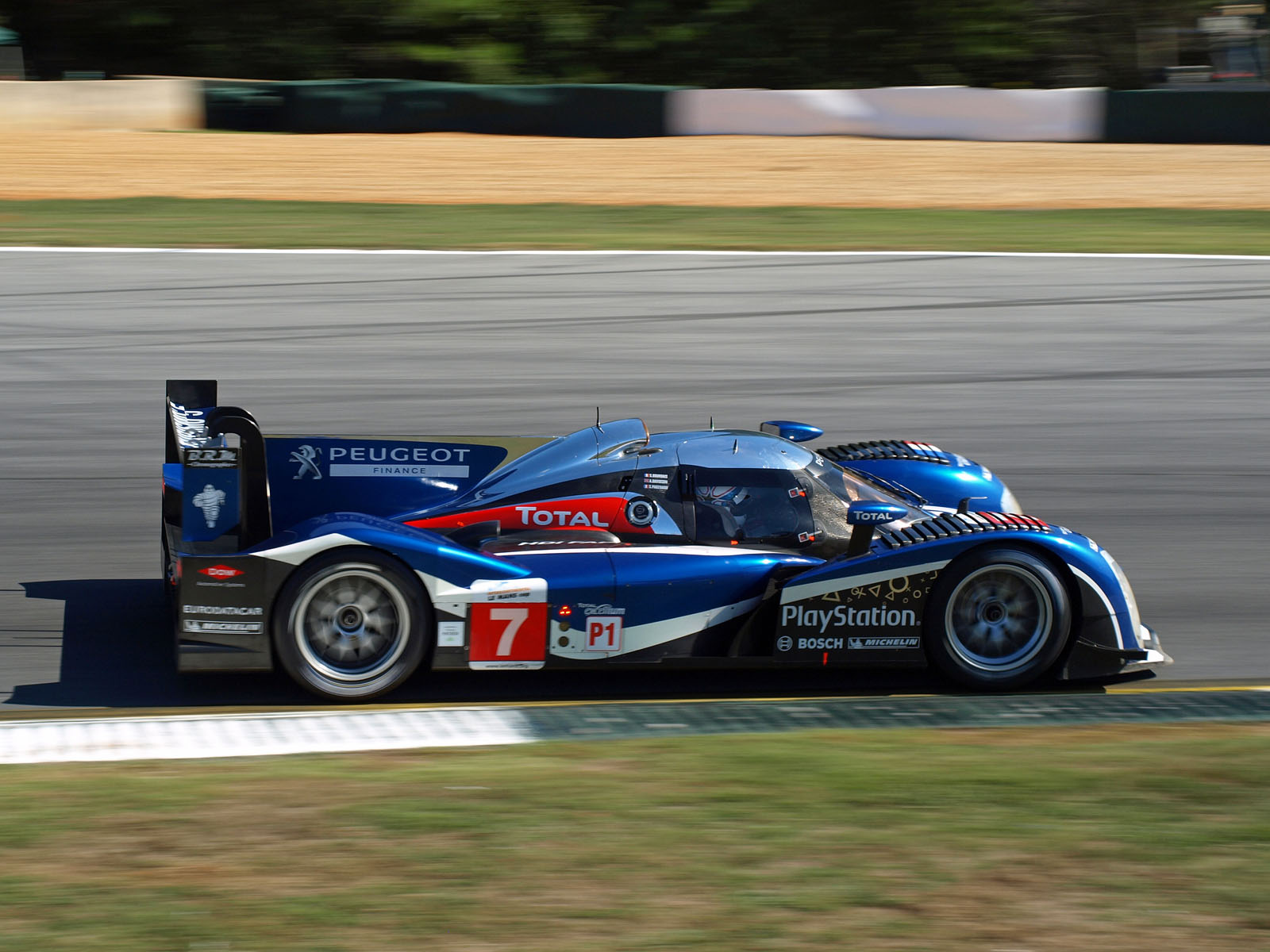
Anthony Davidson won the pole position overall and in LMP1.

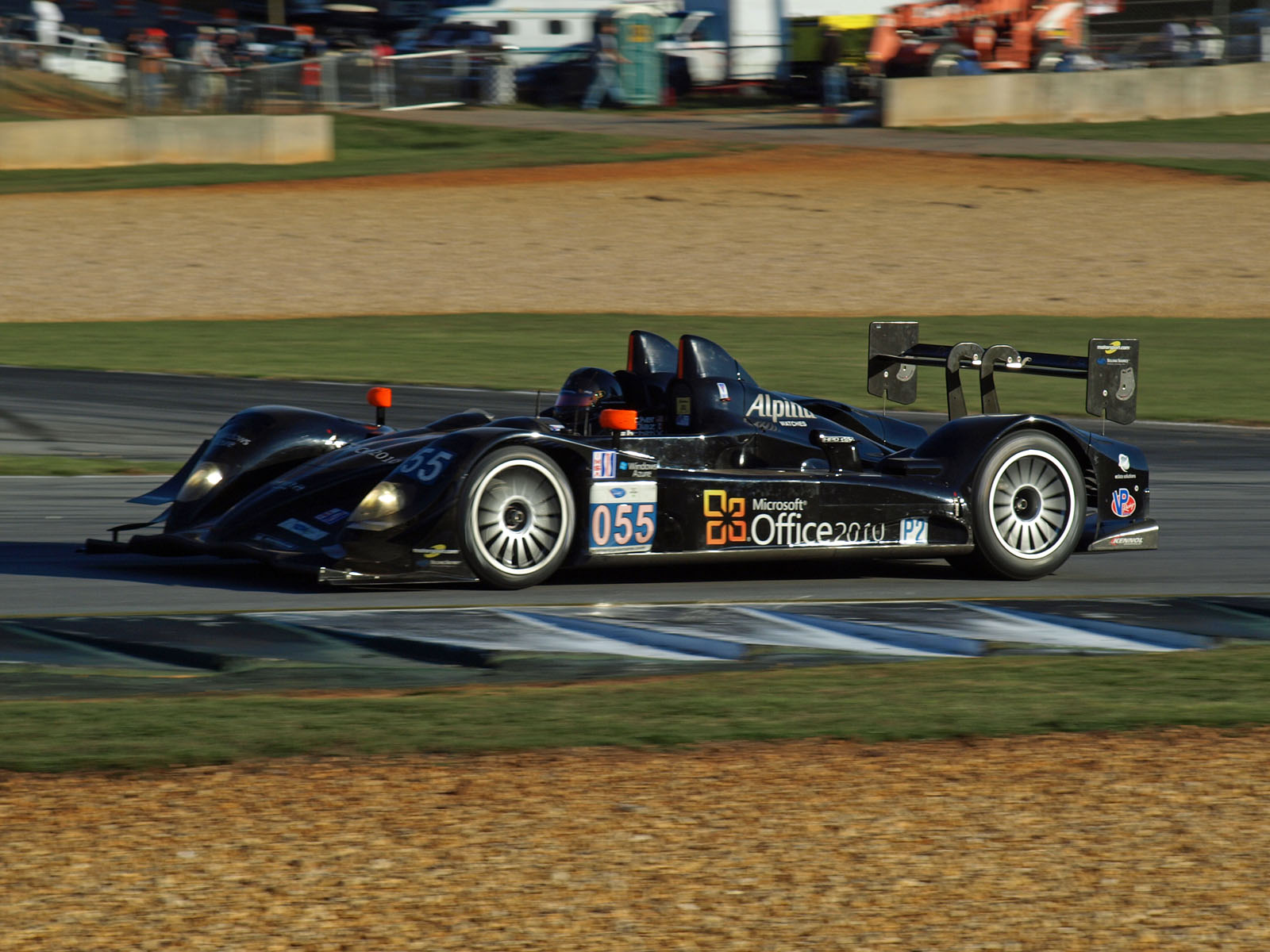
Luis Díaz was polesitter in LMP2 for Level 5 Motorsports.

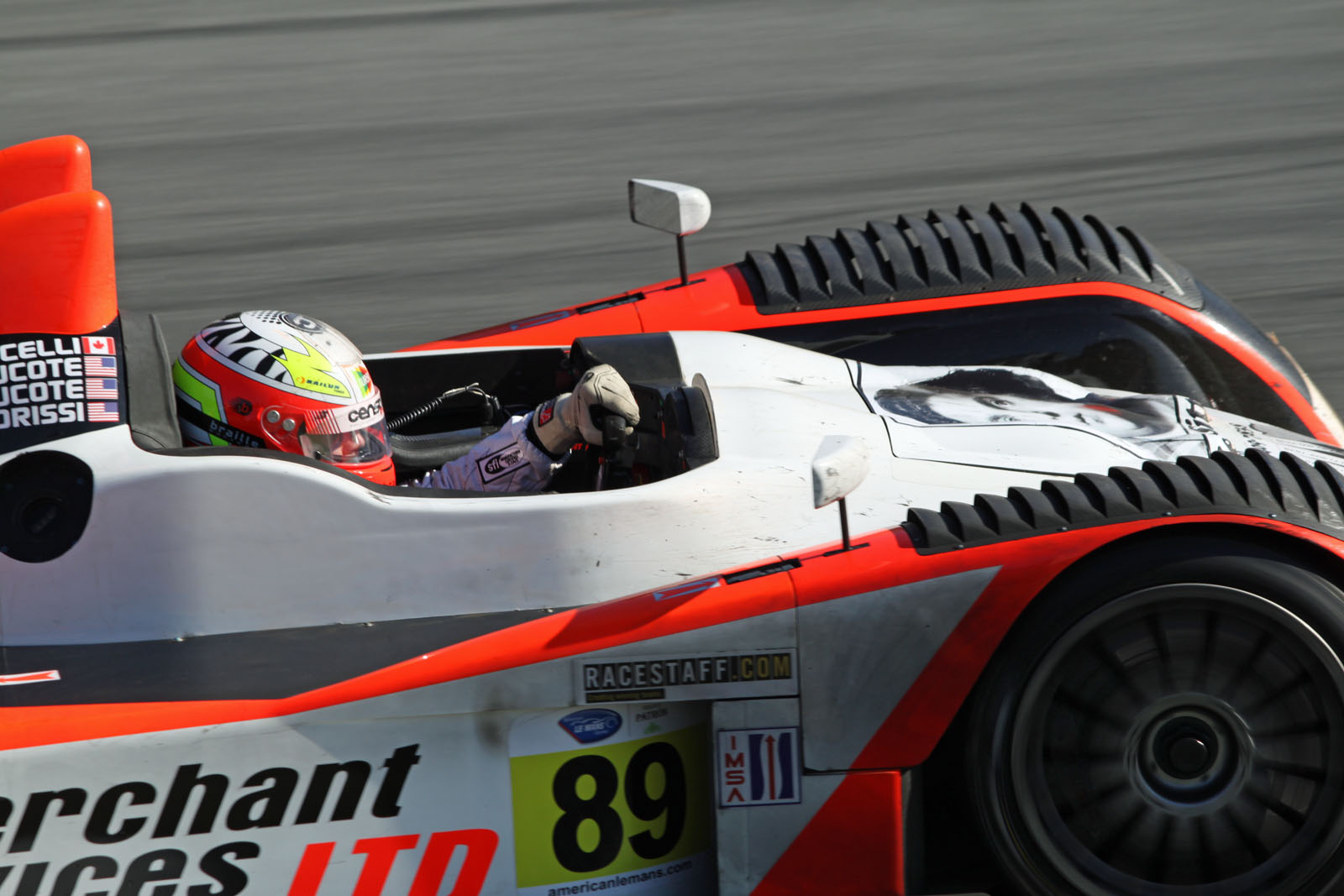
Kyle Marcelli won pole position in LMPC.

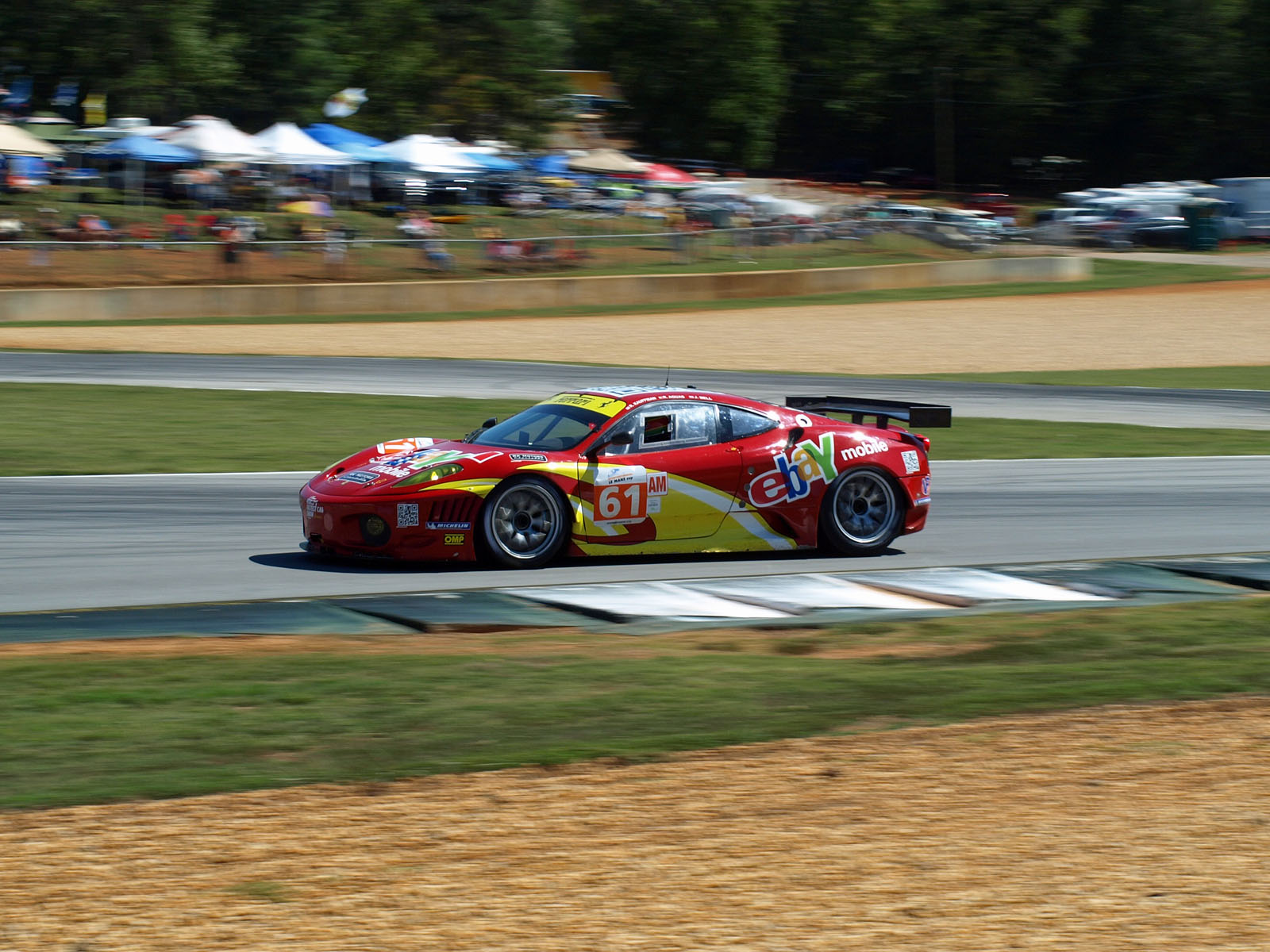
Rui Águas won pole in GTE-Amateur.

Pole position winners in each class are marked in bold.

Pos	Class	Team	Driver	Lap Time	Grid
1	**LMP1**	**#7 Peugeot Sport Total**	**Anthony Davidson**	**1:07.428**	**1**
2	LMP1	#1 Audi Sport Team Joest	Timo Bernhard	1:07.556	2
3	LMP1	#8 Peugeot Sport Total	Stéphane Sarrazin	1:07.881	3
4	LMP1	#2 Audi Sport Team Joest	Rinaldo Capello	1:08.013	4
5	LMP1	#10 Team Oreca Matmut	Nicolas Lapierre	1:09.777	5
6	LMP1	#12 Rebellion Racing	Andrea Belicchi	1:10.123	6
7	LMP1	#24 OAK Racing	Olivier Pla	1:10.355	7
8	LMP1	#007 Aston Martin Racing	Stefan Mücke	1:10.485	8
9	LMP1	#20 Oryx Dyson Racing	Steven Kane	1:10.811	9
10	LMP1	#15 OAK Racing	Pierre Ragues	1:10.864	10
11	LMP1	#6 Muscle Milk Aston Martin Racing	Klaus Graf	1:10.948	11
12	LMP1	#16 Dyson Racing Team	Chris Dyson	1:11.396	12
13	**LMP2**	**#055 Level 5 Motorsports**	**Luis Díaz**	**1:12.335**	**13**
14	LMP2	#26 Signatech Nissan	Jean-Karl Vernay	1:12.640	14
15	LMP2	#33 Level 5 Motorsports	Christophe Bouchut	1:12.729	15
16	LMP2	#35 OAK Racing	Jacques Nicolet	1:14.654	16
17	**LMPC**	**#89 Intersport Racing**	**Kyle Marcelli**	**1:14.848**	**52**
18	LMP2	#22 United Autosports	Stefan Johansson	1:15.158	17
19	LMPC	#36 Genoa Racing	Dane Cameron	1:15.591	DNS
20	LMPC	#52 PR1 Mathiasen Motorsports	Ryan Lewis	1:15.649	18
21	LMPC	#06 CORE Autosport	Gunnar Jeannette	1:15.688	19
22	LMPC	#063 Genoa Racing	Jordan Grogor	1:16.069	20
23	LMPC	#05 CORE Autosport	Frankie Montecalvo	1:16.553	21
24	LMP1	#012 Autocon	Chris McMurry	1:18.420	22
25	**GT**	**#51 AF Corse**	**Gianmaria Bruni**	**1:18.699**	**23**
26	GT	#55 BMW Team RLL	Dirk Werner	1:18.786	24
27	GT	#56 BMW Team RLL	Dirk Müller	1:19.219	25
28	GT	#062 Risi Competizione	Jaime Melo	1:19.247	26
29	GT	#045 Flying Lizard Motorsports	Jörg Bergmeister	1:19.511	27
30	GT	#01 Extreme Speed Motorsports	Johannes van Overbeek	1:19.519	28
31	GT	#59 Luxury Racing	Frédéric Makowiecki	1:19.539	29
32	GT	#4 Corvette Racing	Jan Magnussen	1:19.586	30
33	GT	#3 Corvette Racing	Tommy Milner	1:19.619	31
34	GT	#02 Extreme Speed Motorsports	Guy Cosmo	1:19.705	32
35	GT	#58 Luxury Racing	Ralph Firman	1:20.294	33
36	**GTE-Am**	**#61 AF Corse**	**Rui Águas**	**1:20.619**	**34**
37	GT	#17 Team Falken Tire	Bryan Sellers	1:20.777	35
38	GTE-Am	#57 Krohn Racing	Niclas Jönsson	1:20.880	36
39	GTE-Am	#63 Proton Competition	Richard Lietz	1:20.897	37
40	GT	#99 JaguarRSR	Bruno Junqueira	1:20.996	38
41	GT	#044 Flying Lizard Motorsports	Darren Law	1:21.090	39
42	GTE-Am	#50 Larbre Compétition	Julien Canal	1:21.164	40
43	GTE-Am	#62 CRS Racing	Tim Mullen	1:21.294	41
44	GT	#98 JaguarRSR	Rocky Moran, Jr.	1:21.335	42
45	GT	#48 Paul Miller Racing	Sascha Maassen	1:21.577	43
46	GT	#65 Lotus Jetalliance	Johnny Mowlem	1:22.560	44
47	GTE-Am	#60 Gulf AMR Middle East	Fabien Giroix	1:23.075	45
48	GT	#64 Lotus Jetalliance	Martin Rich	1:23.760	51
49	LMPC	#18 Performance Tech Motorsports	Anthony Nicolosi	1:23.810	46
50	**GTC**	**#54 Black Swan Racing**	**Jeroen Bleekemolen**	**1:24.543**	**47**
51	GTC	#66 TRG	Spencer Pumpelly	1:24.596	48
52	GTC	#68 TRG	Dion von Moltke	1:24.844	49
53	GTC	#23 Alex Job Racing	Leh Keen	1:24.861	50
54	GTC	#77 Magnus Racing	Craig Stanton	1:25.206	DNQ
55	GTC	#34 Green Hornet/Black Swan Racing	No time		DNQ
56	GT	#40 Robertson Racing	No time		53

== Race ==
=== Race result ===
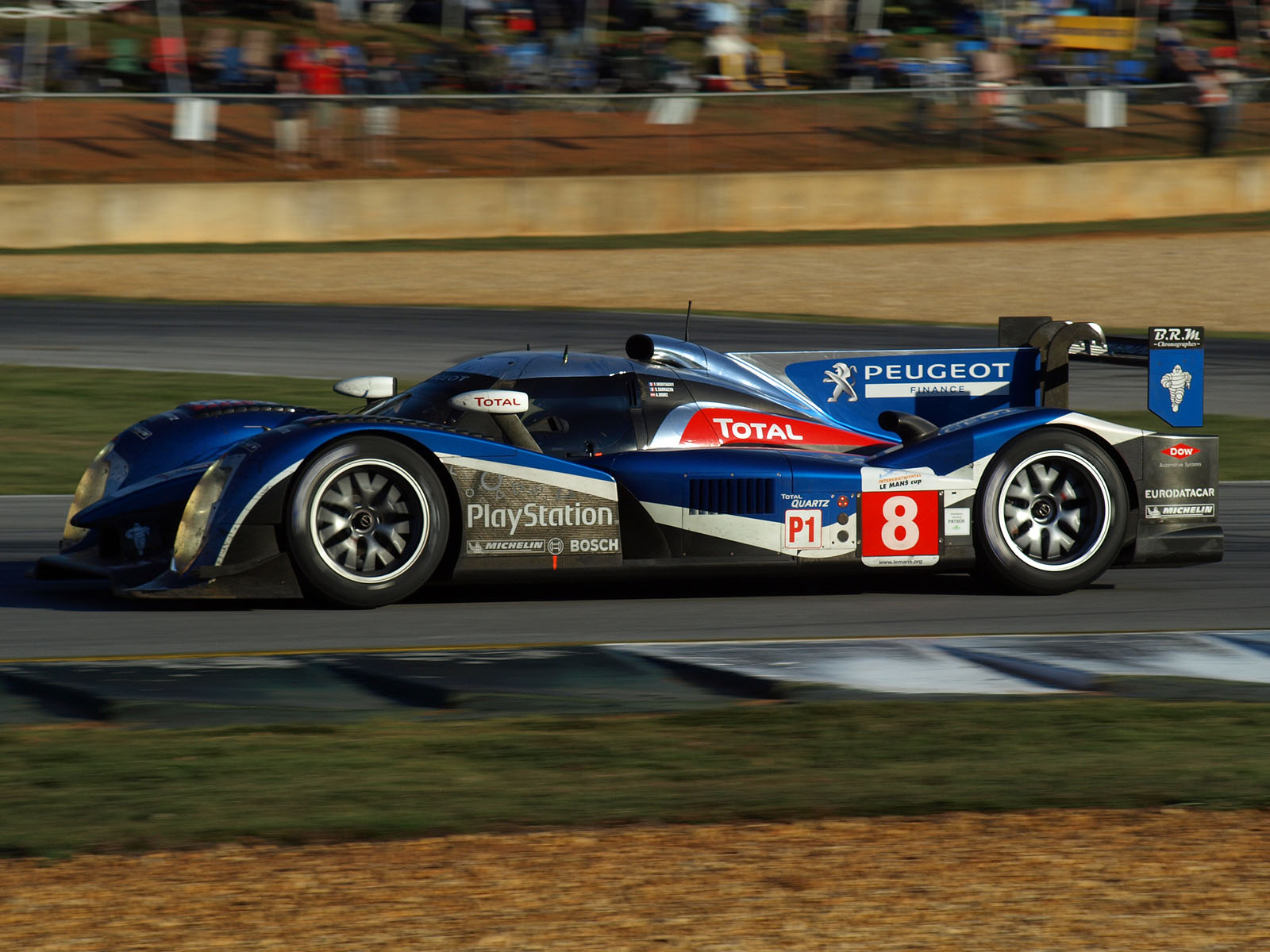
The #8 Peugeot of Franck Montagny, Stéphane Sarrazin, and Alexander Wurz won the race.

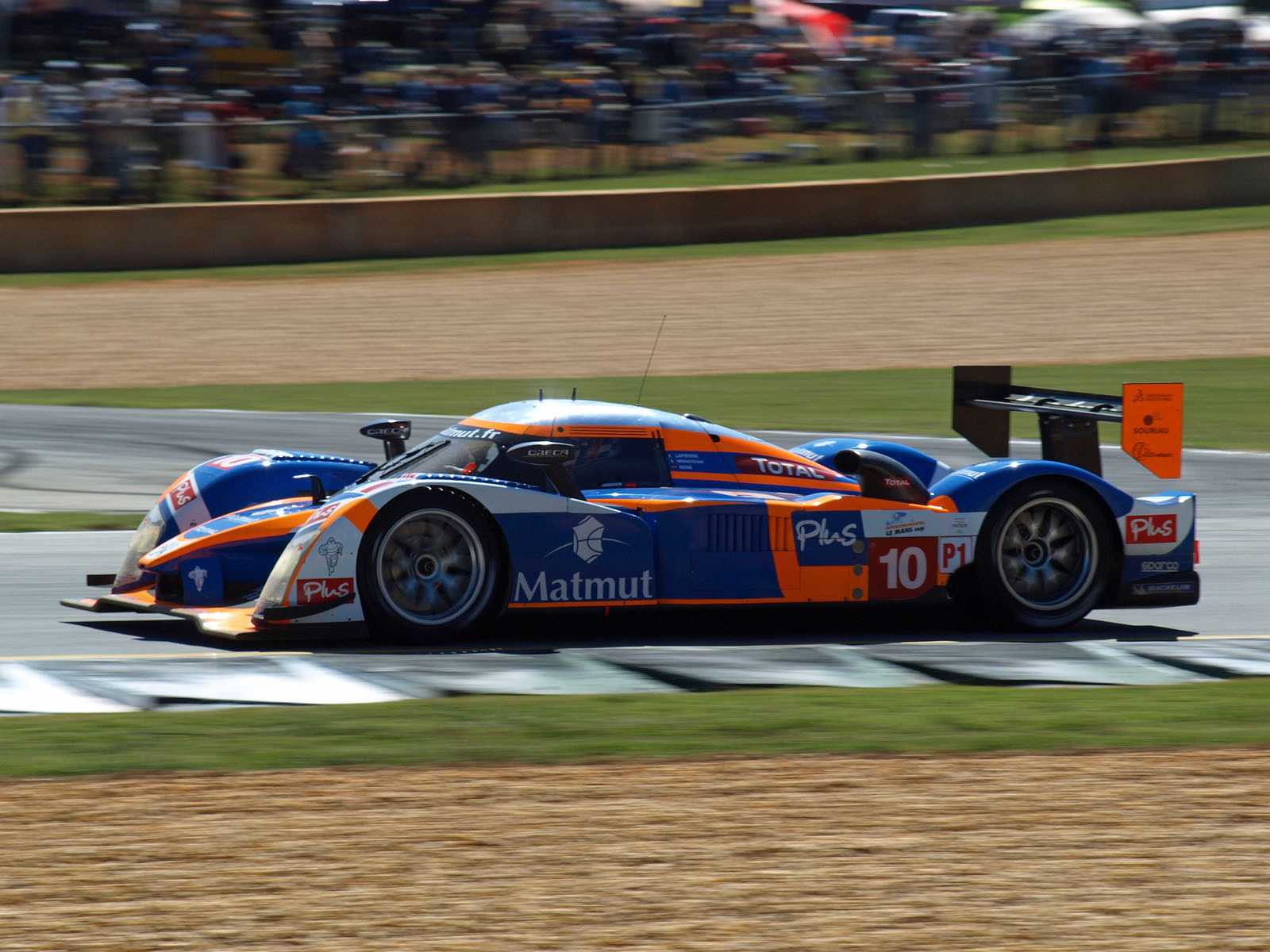
Sebring winners Team Oreca Matmut finished 2nd overall.

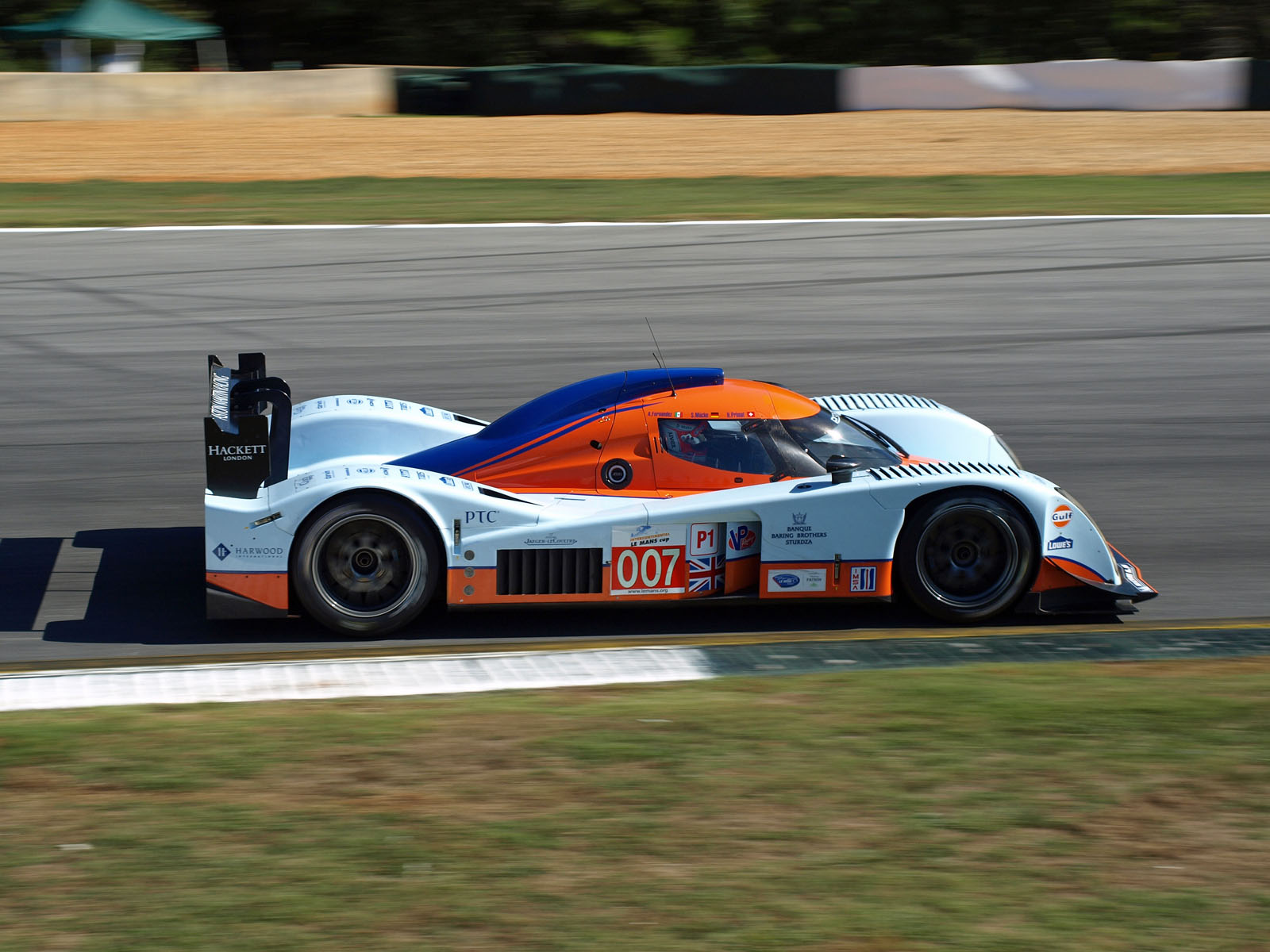
Aston Martin Racing followed a win at Laguna Seca with 3rd place at Petit Le Mans.

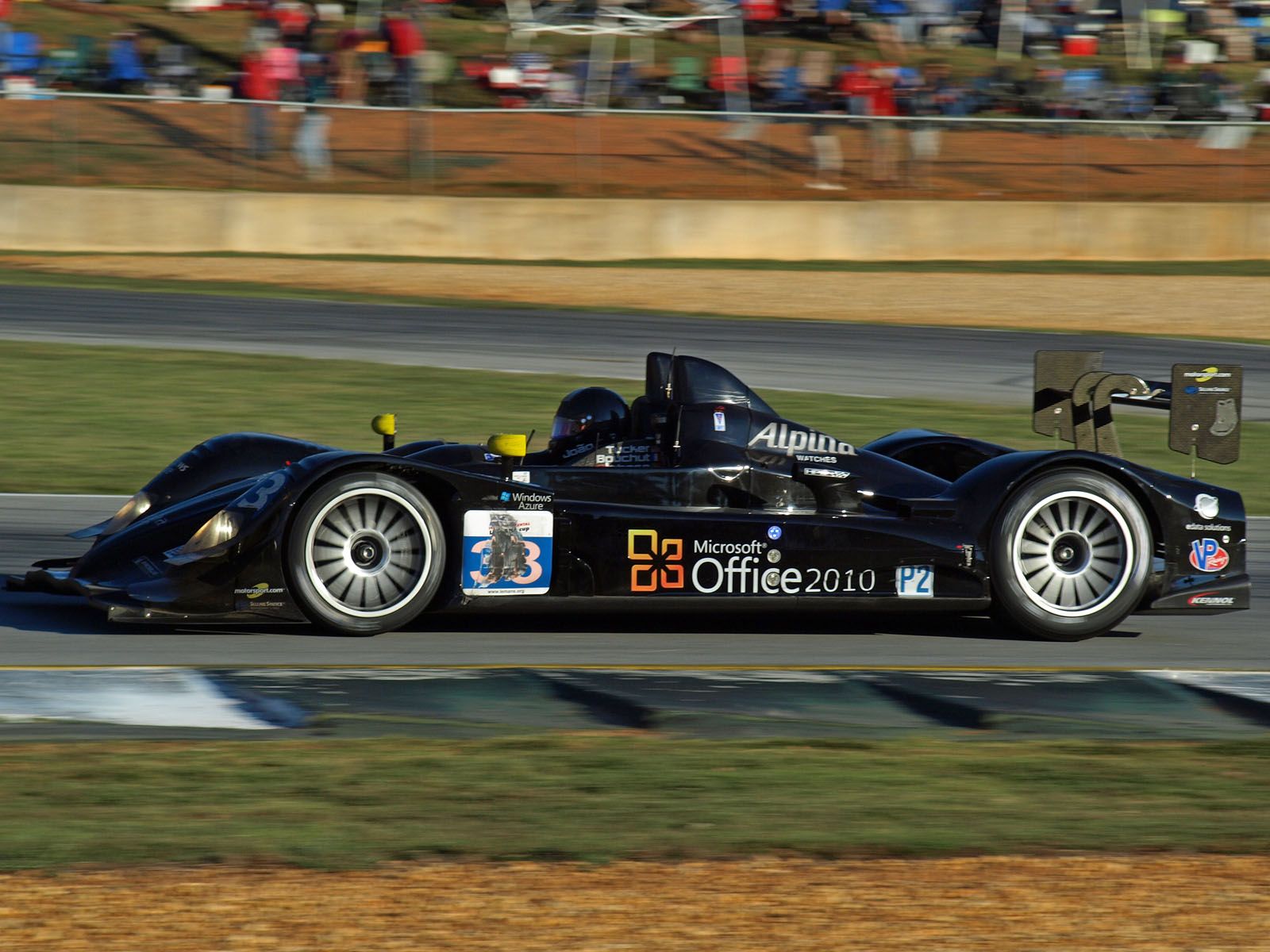
The LMP2 winners were Level 5 Motorsports.

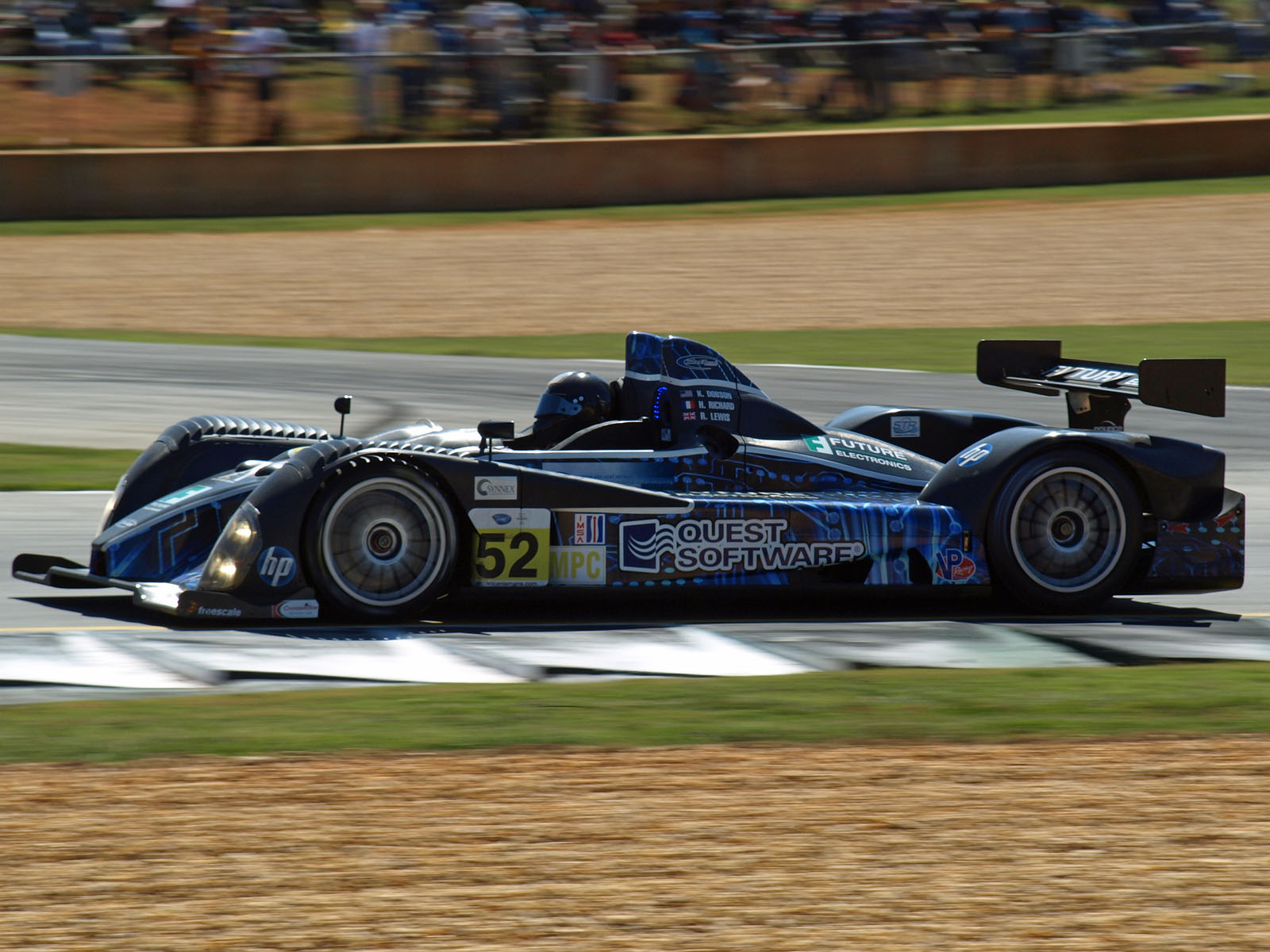
PR1 Mathiasen Motorsports won in LMP Challenge.

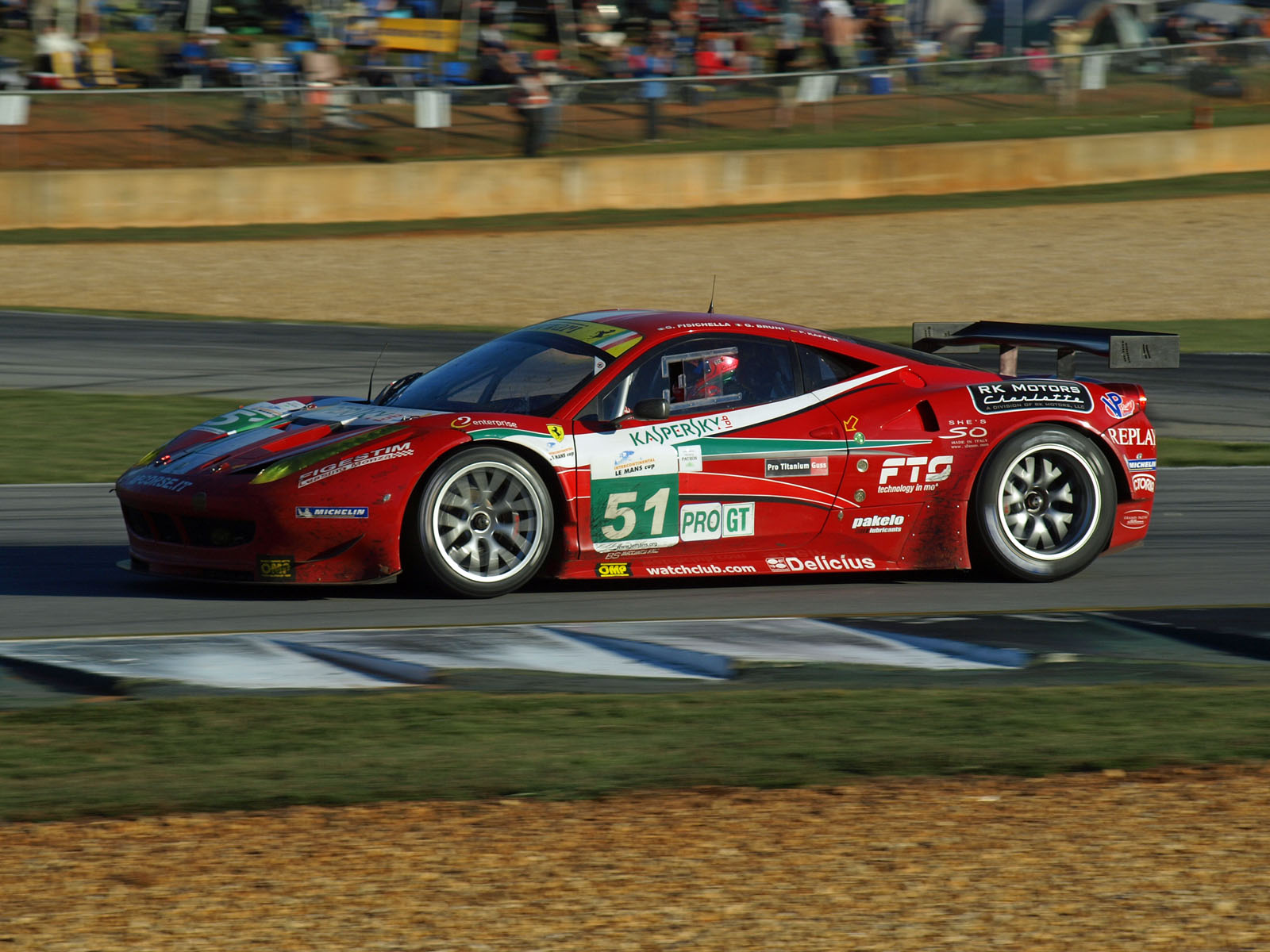
The #51 AF Corse Ferrari team won GT from pole.

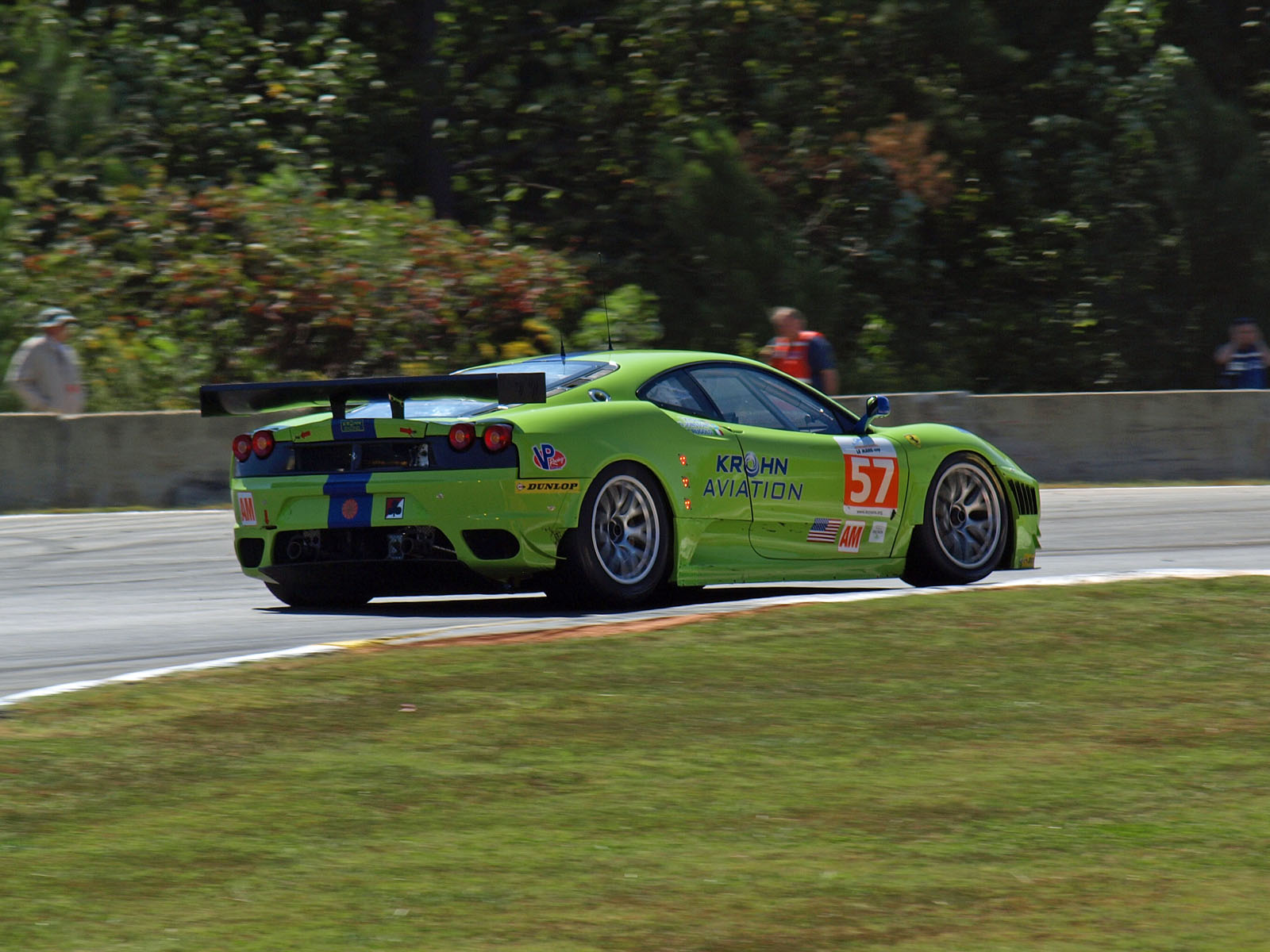
Krohn Racing won the team's home race in GTE Amateur.

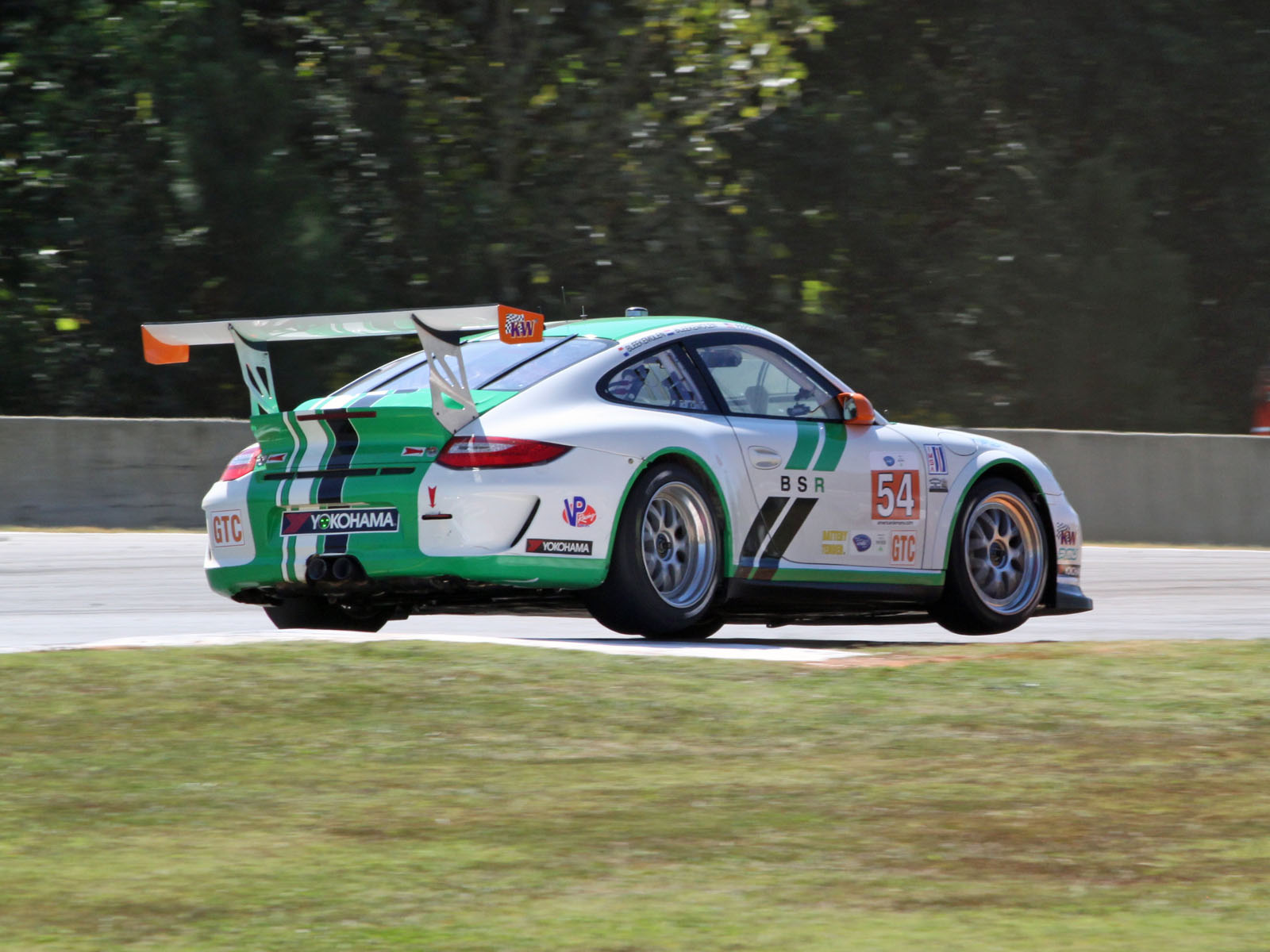
Black Swan Racing won the pole, race, and championship in GT Challenge.

Class winners in bold. Cars failing to complete 70% of their class winner's distance are marked as Not Classified (NC). ILMC competitors are marked with †.

Pos	Class	No	Team	Drivers	Chassis	Tire	Laps
Pos	Class	No	Team	Drivers	Engine	Tire	Laps
1	**LMP1**	**8^{†}**	**(France) Peugeot Sport Total**	**(France) Franck Montagny (France) Stéphane Sarrazin (Austria) Alexander Wurz**	**Peugeot 908**	M	**394**
1	**LMP1**	**8^{†}**	**(France) Peugeot Sport Total**	**(France) Franck Montagny (France) Stéphane Sarrazin (Austria) Alexander Wurz**	**Peugeot HDi 3.7 L Turbo V8 (Diesel)**	M	**394**
2	LMP1	10^{†}	(France) Team Oreca Matmut	(Spain) Marc Gené (France) Nicolas Lapierre (France) Nicolas Minassian	Peugeot 908 HDi FAP	M	389
2	LMP1	10^{†}	(France) Team Oreca Matmut	(Spain) Marc Gené (France) Nicolas Lapierre (France) Nicolas Minassian	Peugeot HDi 5.5 L Turbo V12 (Diesel)	M	389
3	LMP1	007^{†}	(United Kingdom) Aston Martin Racing	(Mexico) Adrián Fernández (Germany) Stefan Mücke (Switzerland) Harold Primat	Lola-Aston Martin B09/60	M	388
3	LMP1	007^{†}	(United Kingdom) Aston Martin Racing	(Mexico) Adrián Fernández (Germany) Stefan Mücke (Switzerland) Harold Primat	Aston Martin 6.0 L V12	M	388
4	LMP1	24^{†}	(France) OAK Racing	(France) Olivier Pla (France) Alexandre Prémat (France) Jean-François Yvon	OAK Pescarolo 01	D	384
4	LMP1	24^{†}	(France) OAK Racing	(France) Olivier Pla (France) Alexandre Prémat (France) Jean-François Yvon	Judd DB 3.4 L V8	D	384
5	LMP1	12^{†}	(Switzerland) Rebellion Racing	(Italy) Andrea Belicchi (Switzerland) Neel Jani (France) Nicolas Prost	Lola B10/60	M	381
5	LMP1	12^{†}	(Switzerland) Rebellion Racing	(Italy) Andrea Belicchi (Switzerland) Neel Jani (France) Nicolas Prost	Toyota RV8KLM 3.4 L V8	M	381
6	**LMP2**	**33^{†}**	**(United States) Level 5 Motorsports**	**(Portugal) João Barbosa (France) Christophe Bouchut (United States) Scott Tucker**	**HPD ARX-01g**	M	**375**
6	**LMP2**	**33^{†}**	**(United States) Level 5 Motorsports**	**(Portugal) João Barbosa (France) Christophe Bouchut (United States) Scott Tucker**	**HPD HR28TT 2.8 L Turbo V6**	M	**375**
7	LMP1	15^{†}	(France) OAK Racing	(France) Matthieu Lahaye (France) Guillaume Moreau (France) Pierre Ragues	OAK Pescarolo 01	D	370
7	LMP1	15^{†}	(France) OAK Racing	(France) Matthieu Lahaye (France) Guillaume Moreau (France) Pierre Ragues	Judd DB 3.4 L V8	D	370
8	**LMPC**	**52**	**(United States) PR1 Mathiasen Motorsports**	**(United States) Ken Dobson (United Kingdom) Ryan Lewis (France) Henri Richard**	**Oreca FLM09**	M	**368**
8	**LMPC**	**52**	**(United States) PR1 Mathiasen Motorsports**	**(United States) Ken Dobson (United Kingdom) Ryan Lewis (France) Henri Richard**	**Chevrolet LS3 6.2 L V8**	M	**368**
9	LMPC	89	(United States) Intersport Racing	(United States) Chapman Ducote (United States) Tomy Drissi (Canada) Kyle Marcelli	Oreca FLM09	M	368
9	LMPC	89	(United States) Intersport Racing	(United States) Chapman Ducote (United States) Tomy Drissi (Canada) Kyle Marcelli	Chevrolet LS3 6.2 L V8	M	368
10	**GT**	**51^{†}**	**(Italy) AF Corse**	**(Italy) Gianmaria Bruni (Italy) Giancarlo Fisichella (Germany) Pierre Kaffer**	**Ferrari 458 Italia GT2**	M	**367**
10	**GT**	**51^{†}**	**(Italy) AF Corse**	**(Italy) Gianmaria Bruni (Italy) Giancarlo Fisichella (Germany) Pierre Kaffer**	**Ferrari 4.5 L V8**	M	**367**
11	GT	045	(United States) Flying Lizard Motorsports	(Germany) Jörg Bergmeister (United States) Patrick Long (France) Patrick Pilet	Porsche 997 GT3-RSR	M	367
11	GT	045	(United States) Flying Lizard Motorsports	(Germany) Jörg Bergmeister (United States) Patrick Long (France) Patrick Pilet	Porsche 4.0 L Flat-6	M	367
12	GT	55^{†}	(Germany) BMW Motorsport (United States) BMW Team RLL	(United States) Bill Auberlen (Brazil) Augusto Farfus (Germany) Dirk Werner	BMW M3 GT2	D	367
12	GT	55^{†}	(Germany) BMW Motorsport (United States) BMW Team RLL	(United States) Bill Auberlen (Brazil) Augusto Farfus (Germany) Dirk Werner	BMW 4.0 L V8	D	367
13	LMP2	22	(United States) United Autosports	(United States) Zak Brown (Sweden) Stefan Johansson (South Africa) Mark Patterson	OAK Pescarolo 01	D	367
13	LMP2	22	(United States) United Autosports	(United States) Zak Brown (Sweden) Stefan Johansson (South Africa) Mark Patterson	Judd-BMW HK 3.6 L V8	D	367
14	GT	4	(United States) Corvette Racing	(United Kingdom) Oliver Gavin (Denmark) Jan Magnussen (United Kingdom) Richard Westbrook	Chevrolet Corvette C6.R	M	366
14	GT	4	(United States) Corvette Racing	(United Kingdom) Oliver Gavin (Denmark) Jan Magnussen (United Kingdom) Richard Westbrook	Chevrolet 5.5 L V8	M	366
15	GT	17	(United States) Team Falken Tire	(Germany) Wolf Henzler (Austria) Martin Ragginger (United States) Bryan Sellers	Porsche 997 GT3-RSR	F	365
15	GT	17	(United States) Team Falken Tire	(Germany) Wolf Henzler (Austria) Martin Ragginger (United States) Bryan Sellers	Porsche 4.0 L Flat-6	F	365
16	GT	01	(United States) Extreme Speed Motorsports	(Germany) Dominik Farnbacher (United States) Scott Sharp (United States) Johannes van Overbeek	Ferrari 458 Italia GT2	M	365
16	GT	01	(United States) Extreme Speed Motorsports	(Germany) Dominik Farnbacher (United States) Scott Sharp (United States) Johannes van Overbeek	Ferrari 4.5 L V8	M	365
17 DNF	LMP1	16	(United States) Dyson Racing Team	(United States) Jay Cochran (United States) Chris Dyson (United Kingdom) Guy Smith	Lola B09/86	D	363
17 DNF	LMP1	16	(United States) Dyson Racing Team	(United States) Jay Cochran (United States) Chris Dyson (United Kingdom) Guy Smith	Mazda MZR-R 2.0 L Turbo I4 (Isobutanol)	D	363
18	GT	58^{†}	(France) Luxury Racing	(Republic of Ireland) Ralph Firman (France) David Hallyday (France) François Jakubowski	Ferrari 458 Italia GT2	M	361
18	GT	58^{†}	(France) Luxury Racing	(Republic of Ireland) Ralph Firman (France) David Hallyday (France) François Jakubowski	Ferrari 4.5 L V8	M	361
19	GT	044	(United States) Flying Lizard Motorsports	(Germany) Marco Holzer (United States) Darren Law (United States) Seth Neiman	Porsche 997 GT3-RSR	M	361
19	GT	044	(United States) Flying Lizard Motorsports	(Germany) Marco Holzer (United States) Darren Law (United States) Seth Neiman	Porsche 4.0 L Flat-6	M	361
20	GT	56^{†}	(Germany) BMW Motorsport (United States) BMW Team RLL	(United States) Joey Hand (Germany) Dirk Müller (United Kingdom) Andy Priaulx	BMW M3 GT2	D	359
20	GT	56^{†}	(Germany) BMW Motorsport (United States) BMW Team RLL	(United States) Joey Hand (Germany) Dirk Müller (United Kingdom) Andy Priaulx	BMW 4.0 L V8	D	359
21	GT	02	(United States) Extreme Speed Motorsports	(United Kingdom) Rob Bell (United States) Ed Brown (United States) Guy Cosmo	Ferrari 458 Italia GT2	M	357
21	GT	02	(United States) Extreme Speed Motorsports	(United Kingdom) Rob Bell (United States) Ed Brown (United States) Guy Cosmo	Ferrari 4.5 L V8	M	357
22	LMP2	26^{†}	(France) Signatech Nissan	(France) Franck Mailleux (Spain) Lucas Ordoñez (France) Jean-Karl Vernay	Oreca 03	M	357
22	LMP2	26^{†}	(France) Signatech Nissan	(France) Franck Mailleux (Spain) Lucas Ordoñez (France) Jean-Karl Vernay	Nissan VK45DE 4.5 L V8	M	357
23	GT	48	(United States) Paul Miller Racing	(France) Emmanuel Collard (Germany) Sascha Maassen (United States) Bryce Miller	Porsche 997 GT3-RSR	Y	357
23	GT	48	(United States) Paul Miller Racing	(France) Emmanuel Collard (Germany) Sascha Maassen (United States) Bryce Miller	Porsche 4.0 L Flat-6	Y	357
24	**GTE; Am**	**57^{†}**	**(United States) Krohn Racing**	**(United States) Tracy Krohn (Sweden) Niclas Jönsson (Italy) Michele Rugolo**	**Ferrari F430 GTE**	D	**355**
24	**GTE; Am**	**57^{†}**	**(United States) Krohn Racing**	**(United States) Tracy Krohn (Sweden) Niclas Jönsson (Italy) Michele Rugolo**	**Ferrari 4.0 L V8**	D	**355**
25	GTE; Am	50^{†}	(France) Larbre Compétition	(France) Patrick Bornhauser (France) Julien Canal (Switzerland) Gabriele Gardel	Chevrolet Corvette C6.R	M	353
25	GTE; Am	50^{†}	(France) Larbre Compétition	(France) Patrick Bornhauser (France) Julien Canal (Switzerland) Gabriele Gardel	Chevrolet 5.5 L V8	M	353
26	GT	40	(United States) Robertson Racing	(United States) David Murry (United States) Andrea Robertson (United States) Melanie Snow	Ford GT-R Mk. VII	M	350
26	GT	40	(United States) Robertson Racing	(United States) David Murry (United States) Andrea Robertson (United States) Melanie Snow	Ford (Élan) 5.0 L V8	M	350
27	**GTC**	**54**	**(United States) Black Swan Racing**	**(Netherlands) Jeroen Bleekemolen (Netherlands) Sebastiaan Bleekemolen (United States) Tim Pappas**	**Porsche 997 GT3 Cup**	Y	**346**
27	**GTC**	**54**	**(United States) Black Swan Racing**	**(Netherlands) Jeroen Bleekemolen (Netherlands) Sebastiaan Bleekemolen (United States) Tim Pappas**	**Porsche 3.8 L Flat-6**	Y	**346**
28	GTC	23	(United States) Alex Job Racing	(United States) Leh Keen (United States) Bill Sweedler (United States) Brian Wong	Porsche 997 GT3 Cup	Y	346
28	GTC	23	(United States) Alex Job Racing	(United States) Leh Keen (United States) Bill Sweedler (United States) Brian Wong	Porsche 3.8 L Flat-6	Y	346
29	GTC	66	(United States) TRG	(United States) Duncan Ende (United States) Peter Ludwig (United States) Spencer Pumpelly	Porsche 997 GT3 Cup	Y	345
29	GTC	66	(United States) TRG	(United States) Duncan Ende (United States) Peter Ludwig (United States) Spencer Pumpelly	Porsche 3.8 L Flat-6	Y	345
30	LMPC	06	(United States) CORE Autosport	(Mexico) Ricardo González (United States) Gunnar Jeannette (Mexico) Rudy Junco, Jr.	Oreca FLM09	M	340
30	LMPC	06	(United States) CORE Autosport	(Mexico) Ricardo González (United States) Gunnar Jeannette (Mexico) Rudy Junco, Jr.	Chevrolet LS3 6.2 L V8	M	340
31	GTE; Am	61^{†}	(Italy) AF Corse	(Portugal) Rui Águas (United Kingdom) Justin Bell (United States) Robert Kaufmann	Ferrari F430 GTE	M	338
31	GTE; Am	61^{†}	(Italy) AF Corse	(Portugal) Rui Águas (United Kingdom) Justin Bell (United States) Robert Kaufmann	Ferrari 4.0 L V8	M	338
32 DNF	LMP1	012	(United States) Autocon	(Canada) Tony Burgess (United States) Chris McMurry (United States) Bryan Willman	Lola B06/10	D	336
32 DNF	LMP1	012	(United States) Autocon	(Canada) Tony Burgess (United States) Chris McMurry (United States) Bryan Willman	AER P32C 4.0 L Turbo V8 (Isobutanol)	D	336
33	GTE; Am	60^{†}	(United Arab Emirates) Gulf AMR Middle East	(France) Fabien Giroix (Germany) Roald Goethe (United Kingdom) Michael Wainwright	Aston Martin V8 Vantage GT2	D	332
33	GTE; Am	60^{†}	(United Arab Emirates) Gulf AMR Middle East	(France) Fabien Giroix (Germany) Roald Goethe (United Kingdom) Michael Wainwright	Aston Martin 4.5 L V8	D	332
34	LMPC	063	(United States) Genoa Racing	(United States) Elton Julian (United States) Eric Lux (United States) Christian Zugel	Oreca FLM09	M	327
34	LMPC	063	(United States) Genoa Racing	(United States) Elton Julian (United States) Eric Lux (United States) Christian Zugel	Chevrolet LS3 6.2 L V8	M	327
35 DNF	LMPC	05	(United States) CORE Autosport	(United States) Jon Bennett (United Kingdom) Ryan Dalziel (United States) Frankie Montecalvo	Oreca FLM09	M	324
35 DNF	LMPC	05	(United States) CORE Autosport	(United States) Jon Bennett (United Kingdom) Ryan Dalziel (United States) Frankie Montecalvo	Chevrolet LS3 6.2 L V8	M	324
36	LMP2	35^{†}	(France) OAK Racing	(France) Frédéric Da Rocha (France) Patrice Lafargue (France) Jacques Nicolet	OAK Pescarolo 01	D	324
36	LMP2	35^{†}	(France) OAK Racing	(France) Frédéric Da Rocha (France) Patrice Lafargue (France) Jacques Nicolet	Judd-BMW HK 3.6 L V8	D	324
37 DNF	GT	59^{†}	(France) Luxury Racing	(France) Anthony Beltoise (France) Frédéric Makowiecki (Monaco) Stéphane Ortelli	Ferrari 458 Italia GT2	M	316
37 DNF	GT	59^{†}	(France) Luxury Racing	(France) Anthony Beltoise (France) Frédéric Makowiecki (Monaco) Stéphane Ortelli	Ferrari 4.5 L V8	M	316
38	LMP2	055	(United States) Level 5 Motorsports	(United States) Scott Tucker (Mexico) Luis Díaz (United Kingdom) Marino Franchitti	HPD ARX-01g	M	314
38	LMP2	055	(United States) Level 5 Motorsports	(United States) Scott Tucker (Mexico) Luis Díaz (United Kingdom) Marino Franchitti	HPD HR28TT 2.8 L Turbo V6	M	314
39	GTE; Am	62^{†}	(United Kingdom) CRS Racing	(Germany) Pierre Ehret (United Kingdom) Tim Mullen (New Zealand) Roger Wills	Ferrari F430 GTE	M	310
39	GTE; Am	62^{†}	(United Kingdom) CRS Racing	(Germany) Pierre Ehret (United Kingdom) Tim Mullen (New Zealand) Roger Wills	Ferrari 4.0 L V8	M	310
40 DNF	LMP1	2^{†}	(Germany) Audi Sport Team Joest	(Italy) Rinaldo Capello (Denmark) Tom Kristensen (United Kingdom) Allan McNish	Audi R18 TDI	M	302
40 DNF	LMP1	2^{†}	(Germany) Audi Sport Team Joest	(Italy) Rinaldo Capello (Denmark) Tom Kristensen (United Kingdom) Allan McNish	Audi TDI 3.7 L Turbo V6 (Diesel)	M	302
41 DNF	LMP1	1^{†}	(Germany) Audi Sport Team Joest	(Germany) Timo Bernhard (Switzerland) Marcel Fässler (France) Romain Dumas	Audi R18 TDI	M	296
41 DNF	LMP1	1^{†}	(Germany) Audi Sport Team Joest	(Germany) Timo Bernhard (Switzerland) Marcel Fässler (France) Romain Dumas	Audi TDI 3.7 L Turbo V6 (Diesel)	M	296
42	LMPC	18	(United States) Performance Tech Motorsports	(United States) Jarrett Boon (Germany) Jan-Dirk Lueders (United States) Anthony Nicolosi	Oreca FLM09	M	293
42	LMPC	18	(United States) Performance Tech Motorsports	(United States) Jarrett Boon (Germany) Jan-Dirk Lueders (United States) Anthony Nicolosi	Chevrolet LS3 6.2 L V8	M	293
43	GTC	68	(United States) TRG	(United States) Ben Keating (United States) Jim Norman (South Africa) Dion von Moltke	Porsche 997 GT3 Cup	Y	247
43	GTC	68	(United States) TRG	(United States) Ben Keating (United States) Jim Norman (South Africa) Dion von Moltke	Porsche 3.8 L Flat-6	Y	247
44 NC	GT	65^{†}	(Austria) Lotus Jetalliance	(Denmark) David Heinemeier Hansson (United Kingdom) Johnny Mowlem (United Kingdom) James Rossiter	Lotus Evora GTE	M	237
44 NC	GT	65^{†}	(Austria) Lotus Jetalliance	(Denmark) David Heinemeier Hansson (United Kingdom) Johnny Mowlem (United Kingdom) James Rossiter	Toyota (Cosworth) 4.0 L V6	M	237
45 DNF	GT	64^{†}	(Austria) Lotus Jetalliance	(Denmark) Kasper Jensen (United Kingdom) Martin Rich (Netherlands) Oskar Slingerland	Lotus Evora GTE	M	197
45 DNF	GT	64^{†}	(Austria) Lotus Jetalliance	(Denmark) Kasper Jensen (United Kingdom) Martin Rich (Netherlands) Oskar Slingerland	Toyota (Cosworth) 4.0 L V6	M	197
46 DNF	GTE; Am	63^{†}	(Germany) Proton Competition	(United States) "Mark Bullitt" (Austria) Richard Lietz (Germany) Christian Ried	Porsche 997 GT3-RSR	M	163
46 DNF	GTE; Am	63^{†}	(Germany) Proton Competition	(United States) "Mark Bullitt" (Austria) Richard Lietz (Germany) Christian Ried	Porsche 4.0 L Flat-6	M	163
47 DNF	GT	99	(United States) JaguarRSR	(Brazil) Bruno Junqueira (Canada) Kenny Wilden (United Kingdom) Ian James	Jaguar XKR GT	D	92
47 DNF	GT	99	(United States) JaguarRSR	(Brazil) Bruno Junqueira (Canada) Kenny Wilden (United Kingdom) Ian James	Jaguar 5.0 L V8	D	92
48 DNF	LMP1	7^{†}	(France) Peugeot Sport Total	(France) Sébastien Bourdais (United Kingdom) Anthony Davidson (France) Simon Pagenaud	Peugeot 908	M	78
48 DNF	LMP1	7^{†}	(France) Peugeot Sport Total	(France) Sébastien Bourdais (United Kingdom) Anthony Davidson (France) Simon Pagenaud	Peugeot HDi 3.7 L Turbo V8 (Diesel)	M	78
49 DNF	GT	3	(United States) Corvette Racing	(Monaco) Olivier Beretta (Spain) Antonio García (United States) Tommy Milner	Chevrolet Corvette C6.R	M	76
49 DNF	GT	3	(United States) Corvette Racing	(Monaco) Olivier Beretta (Spain) Antonio García (United States) Tommy Milner	Chevrolet 5.5 L V8	M	76
50 DNF	LMP1	6	(United States) Muscle Milk Aston Martin Racing	(Germany) Lucas Luhr (Germany) Klaus Graf (United States) Greg Pickett	Lola-Aston Martin B08/62	M	63
50 DNF	LMP1	6	(United States) Muscle Milk Aston Martin Racing	(Germany) Lucas Luhr (Germany) Klaus Graf (United States) Greg Pickett	Aston Martin 6.0 L V12	M	63
51 DNF	LMP1	20	(United States) Oryx Dyson Racing	(United Arab Emirates) Humaid Al Masaood (United Kingdom) Steven Kane (United States) Butch Leitzinger	Lola B09/86	D	29
51 DNF	LMP1	20	(United States) Oryx Dyson Racing	(United Arab Emirates) Humaid Al Masaood (United Kingdom) Steven Kane (United States) Butch Leitzinger	Mazda MZR-R 2.0 L Turbo I4 (Isobutanol)	D	29
52 DNF	GT	98	(United States) JaguarRSR	(United States) P. J. Jones (United States) Shane Lewis (United States) Rocky Moran, Jr.	Jaguar XKR GT	D	27
52 DNF	GT	98	(United States) JaguarRSR	(United States) P. J. Jones (United States) Shane Lewis (United States) Rocky Moran, Jr.	Jaguar 5.0 L V8	D	27
DNS	GT	062	(United States) Risi Competizione	(Brazil) Raphael Matos (Brazil) Jaime Melo (Finland) Toni Vilander	Ferrari 458 Italia GT2	M	
DNS	GT	062	(United States) Risi Competizione	(Brazil) Raphael Matos (Brazil) Jaime Melo (Finland) Toni Vilander	Ferrari 4.5 L V8	M	
DNS	LMPC	36	(United States) Genoa Racing	(South Africa) Jordan Grogor (Australia) Aldous Mitchell (United Arab Emirates) Bassam Kronfli (United States) Dane Cameron	Oreca FLM09	M	
DNS	LMPC	36	(United States) Genoa Racing	(South Africa) Jordan Grogor (Australia) Aldous Mitchell (United Arab Emirates) Bassam Kronfli (United States) Dane Cameron	Chevrolet LS3 6.2 L V8	M	

American Le Mans Series
Previous race: American Le Mans Monterey	2011 season	Next race: none
