= 2011 Baltimore Grand Prix (ALMS) =

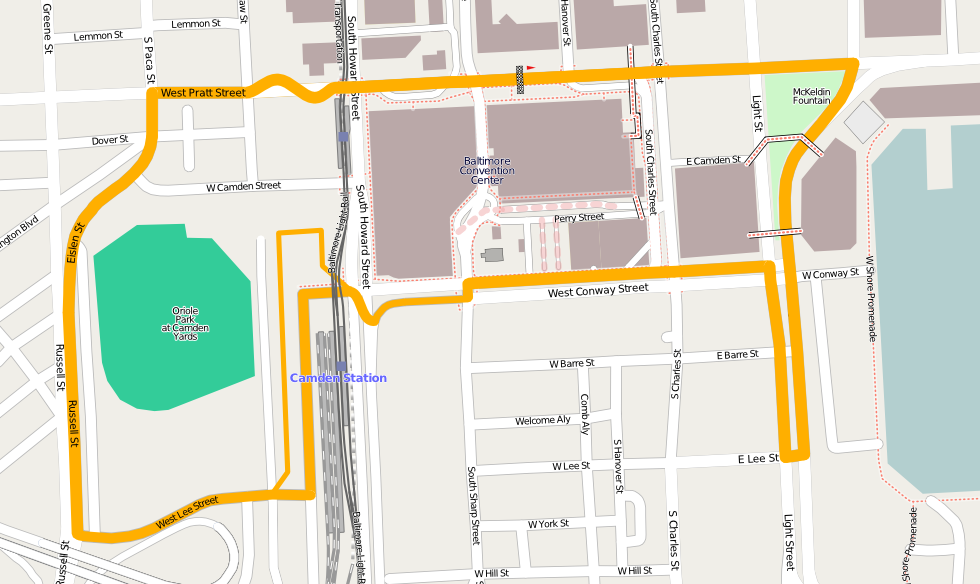
Track map of Baltimore Street Circuit (2011)

The 2011 Baltimore Grand Prix was held at Baltimore Street Circuit on September 3, 2011. It was the seventh round of the 2011 American Le Mans Series season.

== Qualifying ==
=== Qualifying result ===
Pole position winners in each class are marked in bold.

Pos	Class	Team	Driver	Lap Time	Grid
1	**LMP1**	**#16 Dyson Racing Team**	**Guy Smith**	**1:27.750**	**1**
2	LMP1	#20 Oryx Dyson Racing	Steven Kane	1:27.896	2
3	**LMPC**	**#06 CORE Autosport**	**Gunnar Jeannette**	**1:29.407**	**3**
4	LMPC	#37 Intersport Racing	Kyle Marcelli	1:29.473	4
5	LMPC	#63 Genoa Racing	Elton Julian	1:30.407	5
6	**GT**	**#55 BMW Team RLL**	**Dirk Werner**	**1:31.362**	**6**
7	GT	#4 Corvette Racing	Jan Magnussen	1:31.950	7
8	GT	#45 Flying Lizard Motorsports	Patrick Long	1:31.992	30
9	GT	#56 BMW Team RLL	Joey Hand	1:32.010	8
10	GT	#3 Corvette Racing	Tommy Milner	1:32.224	9
11	LMP1	#12 Autocon	Chris McMurry	1:32.587	10
12	GT	#62 Risi Competizione	Jaime Melo	1:32.699	29
13	GT	#17 Team Falken Tire	Wolf Henzler	1:32.772	11
14	LMPC	#05 CORE Autosport	Frankie Montecalvo	1:32.983	12
15	LMPC	#52 PR1 Mathiasen Motorsports	Ryan Lewis	1:33.051	21
16	GT	#44 Flying Lizard Motorsports	Darren Law	1:33.964	27
17	GT	#01 Extreme Speed Motorsports	Johannes van Overbeek	1:34.151	13
18	GT	#99 JaguarRSR	Bruno Junqueira	1:34.360	14
19	GT	#48 Paul Miller Racing	Bryce Miller	1:34.609	15
20	GT	#98 JaguarRSR	P. J. Jones	1:35.911	16
21	LMPC	#18 Performance Tech Motorsports	Jarrett Boon	1:36.046	17
22	**GTC**	**#54 Black Swan Racing**	**Jeroen Bleekemolen**	**1:36.794**	**18**
23	GTC	#23 Alex Job Racing	Leh Keen	1:37.160	19
24	LMPC	#89 Intersport Racing	Chapman Ducote	1:37.569	20
25	GTC	#34 Green Hornet/Black Swan Racing	Andrew Davis	1:37.917	22
26	GT	#02 Extreme Speed Motorsports	Guy Cosmo	1:38.674	28
27	GTC	#68 TRG	Dion von Moltke	1:41.131	24
28	GTC	#77 Magnus Racing	John Potter	1:41.462	25
29	LMP1	#6 Muscle Milk Aston Martin Racing	No Time		25
30	GTC	#66 TRG	No Time		26

== Race ==
=== Race result ===
Class winners in bold. Cars failing to complete 70% of their class winner's distance are marked as Not Classified (NC).

Pos	Class	No	Team	Drivers	Chassis	Tire	Laps
Pos	Class	No	Team	Drivers	Engine	Tire	Laps
1	**LMP1**	**20**	**(United States) Oryx Dyson Racing**	**(United Arab Emirates) Humaid Al Masaood (United Kingdom) Steven Kane**	**Lola B09/86**	D	**71**
1	**LMP1**	**20**	**(United States) Oryx Dyson Racing**	**(United Arab Emirates) Humaid Al Masaood (United Kingdom) Steven Kane**	**Mazda MZR-R 2.0 L Turbo I4 (Isobutanol)**	D	**71**
2	LMP1	16	(United States) Dyson Racing Team	(United States) Chris Dyson (United Kingdom) Guy Smith	Lola B09/86	D	71
2	LMP1	16	(United States) Dyson Racing Team	(United States) Chris Dyson (United Kingdom) Guy Smith	Mazda MZR-R 2.0 L Turbo I4 (Isobutanol)	D	71
3	**LMPC**	**37**	**(United States) Intersport Racing**	**(Canada) Kyle Marcelli (United States) Tomy Drissi**	**Oreca FLM09**	MI	**71**
3	**LMPC**	**37**	**(United States) Intersport Racing**	**(Canada) Kyle Marcelli (United States) Tomy Drissi**	**Chevrolet LS3 6.2 L V8**	MI	**71**
4	LMPC	63	(United States) Genoa Racing	(United States) Eric Lux (United States) Elton Julian	Oreca FLM09	MI	71
4	LMPC	63	(United States) Genoa Racing	(United States) Eric Lux (United States) Elton Julian	Chevrolet LS3 6.2 L V8	MI	71
5	LMPC	05	(United States) CORE Autosport	(United States) Jon Bennett (United States) Frankie Montecalvo	Oreca FLM09	MI	71
5	LMPC	05	(United States) CORE Autosport	(United States) Jon Bennett (United States) Frankie Montecalvo	Chevrolet LS3 6.2 L V8	MI	71
6	**GT**	**17**	**(United States) Team Falken Tire**	**(Germany) Wolf Henzler (United States) Bryan Sellers**	**Porsche 997 GT3-RSR**	FAL	**71**
6	**GT**	**17**	**(United States) Team Falken Tire**	**(Germany) Wolf Henzler (United States) Bryan Sellers**	**Porsche 4.0 L Flat-6**	FAL	**71**
7	LMPC	06	(United States) CORE Autosport	(United States) Gunnar Jeannette (Mexico) Ricardo González	Oreca FLM09	MI	71
7	LMPC	06	(United States) CORE Autosport	(United States) Gunnar Jeannette (Mexico) Ricardo González	Chevrolet LS3 6.2 L V8	MI	71
8	GT	56	(United States) BMW Team RLL	(Germany) Dirk Müller (United States) Joey Hand	BMW M3 GT2	D	70
8	GT	56	(United States) BMW Team RLL	(Germany) Dirk Müller (United States) Joey Hand	BMW 4.0 L V8	D	70
9	GT	4	(United States) Corvette Racing	(United Kingdom) Oliver Gavin (Denmark) Jan Magnussen	Chevrolet Corvette C6.R	MI	70
9	GT	4	(United States) Corvette Racing	(United Kingdom) Oliver Gavin (Denmark) Jan Magnussen	Chevrolet 5.5 L V8	MI	70
10	LMPC	18	(United States) Performance Tech Motorsports	(United States) Anthony Nicolosi (United States) Jarrett Boon	Oreca FLM09	MI	70
10	LMPC	18	(United States) Performance Tech Motorsports	(United States) Anthony Nicolosi (United States) Jarrett Boon	Chevrolet LS3 6.2 L V8	MI	70
11	GT	48	(United States) Paul Miller Racing	(United States) Bryce Miller (Germany) Sascha Maassen	Porsche 997 GT3-RSR	Y	70
11	GT	48	(United States) Paul Miller Racing	(United States) Bryce Miller (Germany) Sascha Maassen	Porsche 4.0 L Flat-6	Y	70
12	GT	62	(United States) Risi Competizione	(Brazil) Jaime Melo (Finland) Toni Vilander	Ferrari 458 Italia GT2	MI	70
12	GT	62	(United States) Risi Competizione	(Brazil) Jaime Melo (Finland) Toni Vilander	Ferrari 4.5 L V8	MI	70
13	GT	55	(United States) BMW Team RLL	(United States) Bill Auberlen (Germany) Dirk Werner	BMW M3 GT2	D	70
13	GT	55	(United States) BMW Team RLL	(United States) Bill Auberlen (Germany) Dirk Werner	BMW 4.0 L V8	D	70
14	GT	3	(United States) Corvette Racing	(Monaco) Olivier Beretta (United States) Tommy Milner	Chevrolet Corvette C6.R	MI	70
14	GT	3	(United States) Corvette Racing	(Monaco) Olivier Beretta (United States) Tommy Milner	Chevrolet 5.5 L V8	MI	70
15	LMP1	12	(United States) Autocon	(Canada) Tony Burgess (United States) Chris McMurry	Lola B06/10	D	68
15	LMP1	12	(United States) Autocon	(Canada) Tony Burgess (United States) Chris McMurry	AER P32C 4.0 L Turbo V8 (Isobutanol)	D	68
16	GT	44	(United States) Flying Lizard Motorsports	(United States) Seth Neiman (United States) Darren Law	Porsche 997 GT3-RSR	MI	68
16	GT	44	(United States) Flying Lizard Motorsports	(United States) Seth Neiman (United States) Darren Law	Porsche 4.0 L Flat-6	MI	68
17	GT	01	(United States) Extreme Speed Motorsports	(United States) Scott Sharp (United States) Johannes van Overbeek	Ferrari 458 Italia GT2	MI	68
17	GT	01	(United States) Extreme Speed Motorsports	(United States) Scott Sharp (United States) Johannes van Overbeek	Ferrari 4.5 L V8	MI	68
18	GT	02	(United States) Extreme Speed Motorsports	(United States) Ed Brown (United States) Guy Cosmo	Ferrari 458 Italia GT2	MI	68
18	GT	02	(United States) Extreme Speed Motorsports	(United States) Ed Brown (United States) Guy Cosmo	Ferrari 4.5 L V8	MI	68
19	**GTC**	**54**	**(United States) Black Swan Racing**	**(United States) Tim Pappas (Netherlands) Jeroen Bleekemolen**	**Porsche 997 GT3 Cup**	Y	**67**
19	**GTC**	**54**	**(United States) Black Swan Racing**	**(United States) Tim Pappas (Netherlands) Jeroen Bleekemolen**	**Porsche 4.0 L Flat-6**	Y	**67**
20	GTC	23	(United States) Alex Job Racing	(United States) Bill Sweedler (United States) Leh Keen	Porsche 997 GT3 Cup	Y	67
20	GTC	23	(United States) Alex Job Racing	(United States) Bill Sweedler (United States) Leh Keen	Porsche 4.0 L Flat-6	Y	67
21	GTC	77	(United States) Magnus Racing	(United States) John Potter (United States) Craig Stanton	Porsche 997 GT3 Cup	Y	67
21	GTC	77	(United States) Magnus Racing	(United States) John Potter (United States) Craig Stanton	Porsche 4.0 L Flat-6	Y	67
22	GTC	34	(United States) Green Hornet (United States) Black Swan Racing	(United States) Peter LeSaffre (United States) Andrew Davis	Porsche 997 GT3 Cup	Y	67
22	GTC	34	(United States) Green Hornet (United States) Black Swan Racing	(United States) Peter LeSaffre (United States) Andrew Davis	Porsche 4.0 L Flat-6	Y	67
23	GTC	68	(United States) TRG	(South Africa) Dion von Moltke (United States) Marc Bunting	Porsche 997 GT3 Cup	Y	67
23	GTC	68	(United States) TRG	(South Africa) Dion von Moltke (United States) Marc Bunting	Porsche 4.0 L Flat-6	Y	67
24	GTC	66	(United States) TRG	(United States) Duncan Ende (United States) Spencer Pumpelly	Porsche 997 GT3 Cup	Y	67
24	GTC	66	(United States) TRG	(United States) Duncan Ende (United States) Spencer Pumpelly	Porsche 4.0 L Flat-6	Y	67
25	LMP1	6	(United States) Muscle Milk Aston Martin Racing	(France) Romain Dumas (Germany) Klaus Graf	Lola-Aston Martin B08/62	MI	64
25	LMP1	6	(United States) Muscle Milk Aston Martin Racing	(France) Romain Dumas (Germany) Klaus Graf	Aston Martin 6.0 L V12	MI	64
26	GT	45	(United States) Flying Lizard Motorsports	(Germany) Jörg Bergmeister (United States) Patrick Long	Porsche 997 GT3-RSR	MI	56
26	GT	45	(United States) Flying Lizard Motorsports	(Germany) Jörg Bergmeister (United States) Patrick Long	Porsche 4.0 L Flat-6	MI	56
27 DNF	LMPC	89	(United States) Intersport Racing	(United States) Chapman Ducote (United States) David Ducote	Oreca FLM09	MI	52
27 DNF	LMPC	89	(United States) Intersport Racing	(United States) Chapman Ducote (United States) David Ducote	Chevrolet LS3 6.2 L V8	MI	52
28 DNF	LMPC	52	(United States) PR1 Mathiasen Motorsports	(United States) Ken Dobson (United Kingdom) Ryan Lewis	Oreca FLM09	MI	14
28 DNF	LMPC	52	(United States) PR1 Mathiasen Motorsports	(United States) Ken Dobson (United Kingdom) Ryan Lewis	Chevrolet LS3 6.2 L V8	MI	14
29 DNF	GT	98	(United States) JaguarRSR	(United States) P. J. Jones (United States) Rocky Moran, Jr.	Jaguar XKR GT	D	1
29 DNF	GT	98	(United States) JaguarRSR	(United States) P. J. Jones (United States) Rocky Moran, Jr.	Jaguar 5.0 L V8	D	1
DNS	GT	99	(United States) JaguarRSR	(Brazil) Bruno Junqueira (Canada) Kenny Wilden	Jaguar XKR GT	D	-
DNS	GT	99	(United States) JaguarRSR	(Brazil) Bruno Junqueira (Canada) Kenny Wilden	Jaguar 5.0 L V8	D	-

American Le Mans Series
Previous race: Road Race Showcase	2011 season	Next race: American Le Mans Monterey
