= Kyle Marcelli =

Canadian racing driver (born 1990)

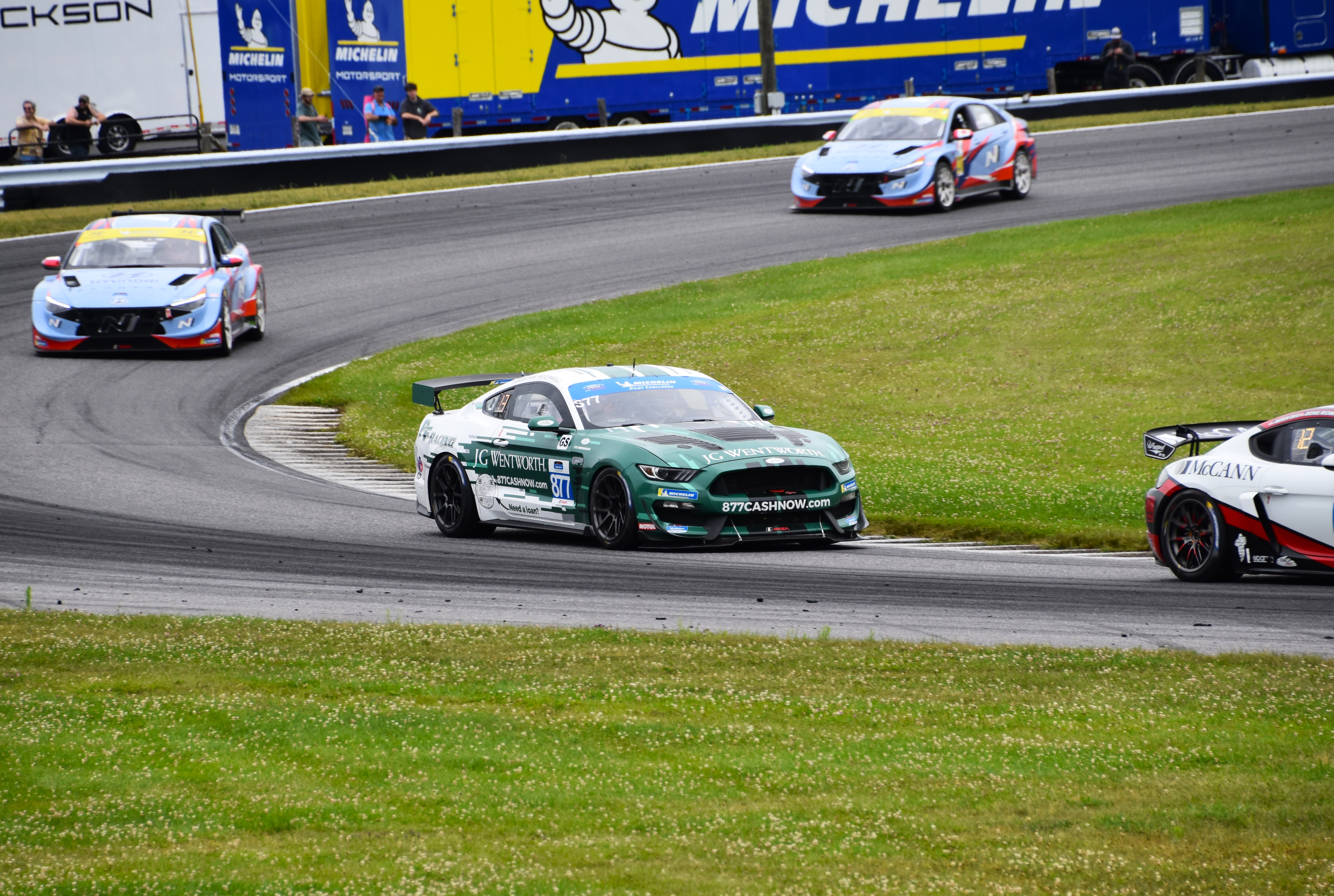
- Nationality: (Canada) Canadian
- Born: 23 February 1990 (age 36) Scarborough, Ontario, Canada

Michelin Pilot Challenge career
- Debut season: 2014
- Current team: KohR Motorsports
- Categorisation: FIA Gold (until 2017, 2019–2026); FIA Silver (2018, 2027–)

NASCAR Canada Series career
- 3 races run over 1 year
- 2021 position: 25th
- Best finish: 25th (2021)
- First race: 2021 Guardian Angels 60 (Trois-Rivières)
- Last race: 2021 Clarington 200 (Mosport)
Wins	Top tens	Poles
0	1	0
- Car number: 59
- Former teams: Rebel Rock Racing; Mantella Autosport; Mühlner Motorsports America

Previous series
- 2014, 16, 18 2010–13: WeatherTech SportsCar Championship; American Le Mans Series

Championship titles
- 2022, 2023 2020 2019 2007: Lamborghini Super Trofeo North America – Pro; Michelin Pilot Challenge – GS class GT World Challenge America – Pro-Am class Formula Ford Ontario Championship

Kyle Marcelli (born 23 February 1990) is a Canadian racing driver who currently competes in the Michelin Pilot Challenge.

== Career ==
Marcelli began his racing career in karts in 2005, before moving into single seaters for the 2006 Bridgestone F2000 Racing Series, in which he finished second. In December 2014, Marcelli was a part of the Davidson Racing team that won the yearly 25 Hours of Thunderhill, driving a Norma prototype chassis alongside co-drivers Randy Pobst, Alex Lloyd, and Brian Frisselle. For the following Continental Tire Sports Car Challenge season, Marcelli signed with Mantella Autosport. He would spend just one season with the team, joining Performance Tech Motorsports for the full WeatherTech SportsCar Championship season in 2016. The following season would see Marcelli take on SprintX races in the Pirelli World Challenge for R.Ferri Motorsport. Driving for KohR Motorsports, Marcelli won the 2020 Michelin Pilot Challenge GS class championship.

After scoring the championship in the 2022 Lamborghini Super Trofeo North America, Marcelli and co-driver Danny Formal returned to defend their title in 2023. Over 12 races, the pair scored ten total race victories. In 2024, after another title victory in Super Trofeo competition, Marcelli and Formal stepped up to the IMSA SportsCar Championship full-time in the GTD class.

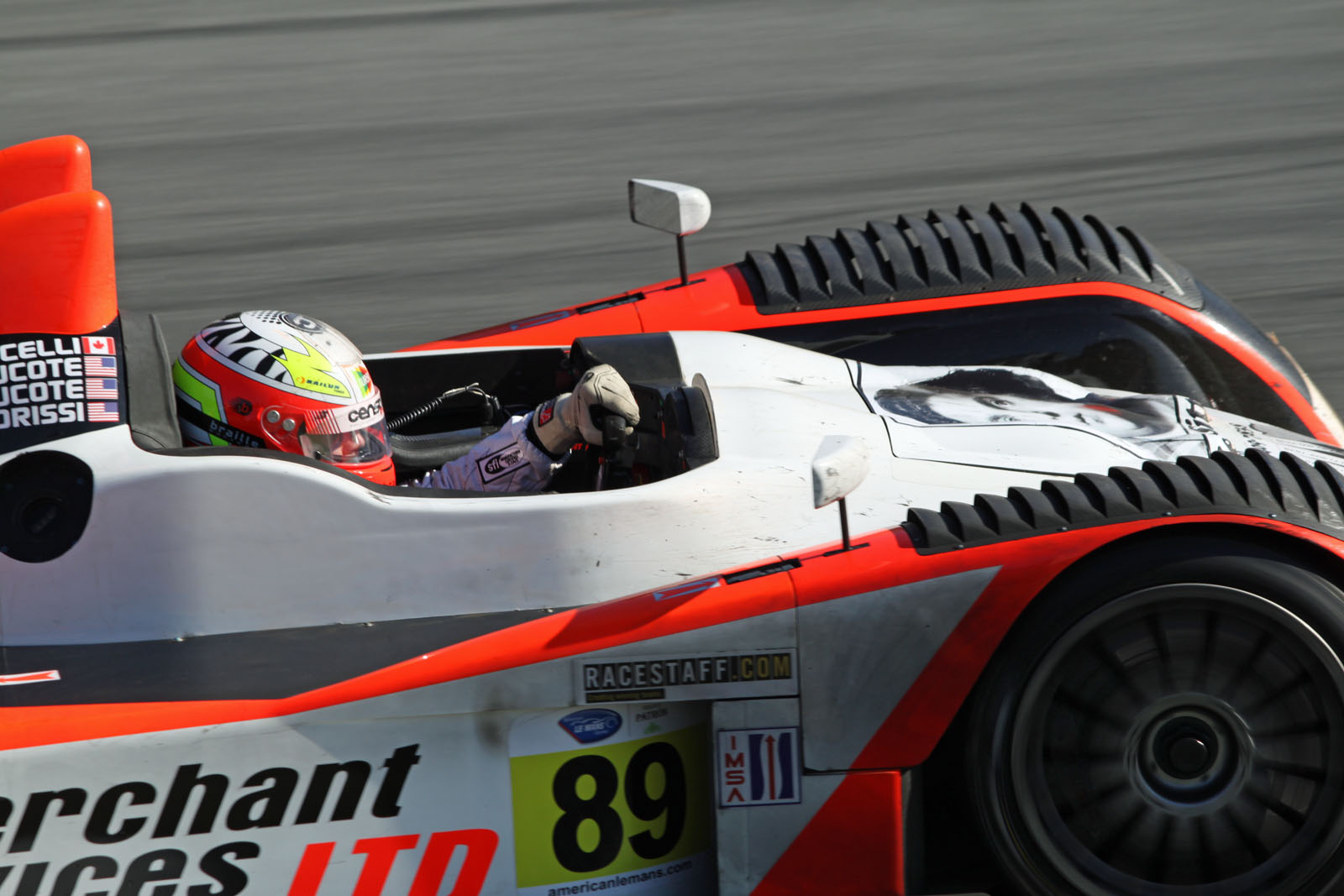
Marcelli driving for Intersport Racing at Petit Le Mans in 2011

== Racing record ==
=== Complete American Le Mans Series results ===
(key) (Races in bold indicate pole position)

Year	Team	Class	Make	Engine	1	2	3	4	5	6	7	8	9	10	Rank	Points
2010	Performance Tech	LMPC	Oreca FLM09	Chevrolet LS3 6.2L V8	SEB; 4	LBH; 5									5th	101
2010	Genoa Racing	LMPC	Oreca FLM09	Chevrolet LS3 6.2L V8			LGA; 2								5th	101
2010	Intersport Racing	LMPC	Oreca FLM09	Chevrolet LS3 6.2L V8				MIL; 10	**LRP**; 8	MOH; 4	ELK; 4	MOS; 6	PET; 2		5th	101
2011	Intersport Racing	LMPC	Oreca FLM09	Chevrolet LS3 6.2L V8	SEB; 8	LBH; 2	LRP; 3	**MOS**; 6	MOH; 1	ELK; 4	BAL; 1	**LGA**; 3	PET; 2		3rd	124
2012	BAR1 Motorsports	LMPC	Oreca FLM09	Chevrolet LS3 6.2L V8	SEB; 9	LBH; 4	LGA; 5	**LRP**; 6	MOS; 5	MOH; 3	**ELK**; 3	BAL; 5	**VIR**; 7	**PET**; 5	9th	53
2013	BAR1 Motorsports	LMPC	Oreca FLM09	Chevrolet LS3 6.2L V8	SEB; 2	LBH; 6	LGA; 4	LRP; 4	MOS; 3	ELK; 2	BAL; 5	COT; 1	VIR; 1	PET; 1	4th	128

=== Complete Grand-Am Rolex Sports Car Series results ===
(key) (Races in bold indicate pole position)

Year	Team	Class	Make	Engine	1	2	3	4	5	6	7	8	9	10	11	12	Rank	Points
2013	Mühlner Motorsports America	GT	Porsche 911 GT3 Cup	Porsche 4.0L Flat-6	DAY	COT; 9	BAR	ATL	DET	MOH	WGL	IMS	ELK	KAN	LGA; 8	LIM; DNS	49th	45

=== Complete WeatherTech SportsCar Championship results ===
(key) (Races in bold indicate pole position)

Year	Team	Class	Make	Engine	1	2	3	4	5	6	7	8	9	10	11	12	Rank	Points
2014	Starworks Motorsport	PC	Oreca FLM09	Chevrolet 6.2 L V8	DAY; 6				KAN					VIR; 5	COT		35th	28
2014	Scuderia Corsa	GTD	Ferrari 458 Italia GT3	Ferrari 4.5 L V8		SEB; 18	LGA; 10	DET; 16		WGL	MOS	IMS	ELK			PET; 9	49th	40
2016	Performance Tech Motorsports	PC	Oreca FLM09	Chevrolet 6.2 L V8	DAY; 6	SEB; 5	**LBH**; 3	LGA; 4	BEL; 4	WGL; 2	MOS; 4	LIM; 3	**ELK**; 3	COT	PET; 2		5th	274
2018	3GT Racing	GTD	Lexus RC F GT3	Lexus 5.0 L V8	DAY; 15	SEB; 14	MOH; 1	BEL; 6	WGL; 13	MOS; 2	LIM; 7	ELK; 6	VIR; 1	LGA; 10	PET; 14		5th	268
2022	WTR – Racers Edge Motorsports	GTD Pro	Acura NSX GT3 Evo22	Acura 3.5 L Turbo V6	DAY	SEB; 8	LBH	LGA	WGL	MOS	LIM	ELK	VIR	PET			33rd	252
2022	AWA	LMP3	Ligier JS P320	Nissan VK56DE 5.6 L V8	DAY	SEB	MOH	WGL; 9	MOS; 4	ELK	PET; 6						20th	800
2023	Racers Edge Motorsports with WTR Andretti	GTD	Acura NSX GT3 Evo22	Acura 3.5 L Turbo V6	DAY; 6	**SEB**; 19	LBH	MON	WGL; 8	MOS	LIM	ELK	VIR	IMS; 17	PET; 14		26th	1029
2024	Wayne Taylor Racing with Andretti	GTD	Lamborghini Huracán GT3 Evo 2	Lamborghini 5.2 L V10	DAY; 17	SEB; 15	LBH; 8	**LGA**; 5	WGL; 12	MOS; 6	ELK	VIR; 11	IMS; 10	PET; 5			14th	2125
2025	Wayne Taylor Racing	GTD	Lamborghini Huracán GT3 Evo 2	Lamborghini 5.2 L V10	DAY; 10	SEB	LBH	LGA	WGL	MOS	ELK	VIR	IMS	PET			72nd	240

=== NASCAR ===
(key) (Bold – Pole position awarded by qualifying time. Italics – Pole position earned by points standings or practice time. * – Most laps led.)

==== Pinty's Series ====
NASCAR Pinty's Series results
Year	Team	No.	Make	1	2	3	4	5	6	7	8	9	10	NPSC	Pts	Ref
2021	Dave Jacombs	7	Ford	SUN	SUN	CTR; 15	ICAR	MSP; 22	MSP; 3	FLA	DEL	DEL	DEL	-*	-*	

Sporting positions
Preceded by Tyler McQuarrie; Jeff Westphal	Michelin Pilot Challenge; GS Champion; 2020; With: Nate Stacy	Succeeded by Jan Heylen
Preceded by Richard Antinucci	Lamborghini Super Trofeo North America; Pro Champion; 2022, 2023; With: Danny Formal	Succeeded by Incumbent
