= Benjamin Leuenberger =

Swiss businessman and former racing driver (born 1982)

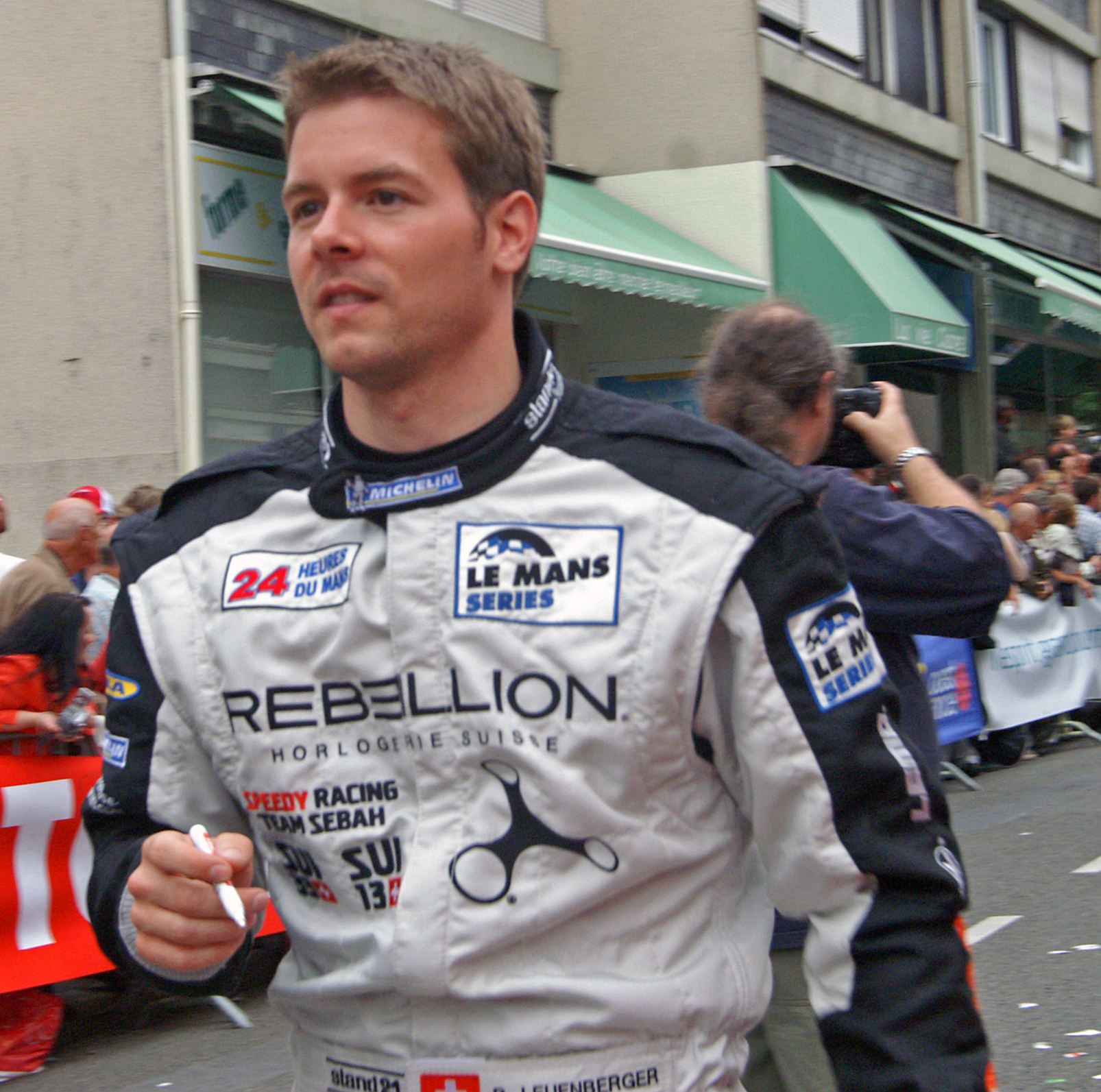
- Leuenberger in 2009
- Nationality: (Switzerland) Swiss
- Born: 11 June 1982 (age 44) Solothurn, Switzerland
- Categorisation: FIA Gold (until 2012); FIA Silver (2013–2019)

Championship titles
- 1999: Formula BMW ADAC – Junior

Benjamin Leuenberger (born 11 June 1982) is a Swiss businessman and former racing driver.

Leuenberger notably competed for Panoz's factory LMP900 team in the American Le Mans Series in 2003. He later dabbled between the LMP1, LMP2, GT1 and GT2 classes of the Le Mans Series until 2009, winning on his final start for Speedy Racing Team Sebah and scoring a podium at the 24 Hours of Le Mans.

== Business ventures ==
Alongside his racing career, Leuenberger has been working at A. Aubry AG since 2004, a plastic fabrication company in which he serves as CEO since 2022.

== Career ==
Leuenberger began his single-seater career in 1999, spending two years in Formula BMW ADAC, winning the Junior title on his debut season and finishing eighth in the overall standings in 2000. After a year in Formula Renault 2000 Eurocup with JD Motorsport, Leuenberger switched to sportscars for 2002, competing for Carsport Racing in Porsche Carrera Cup Germany.

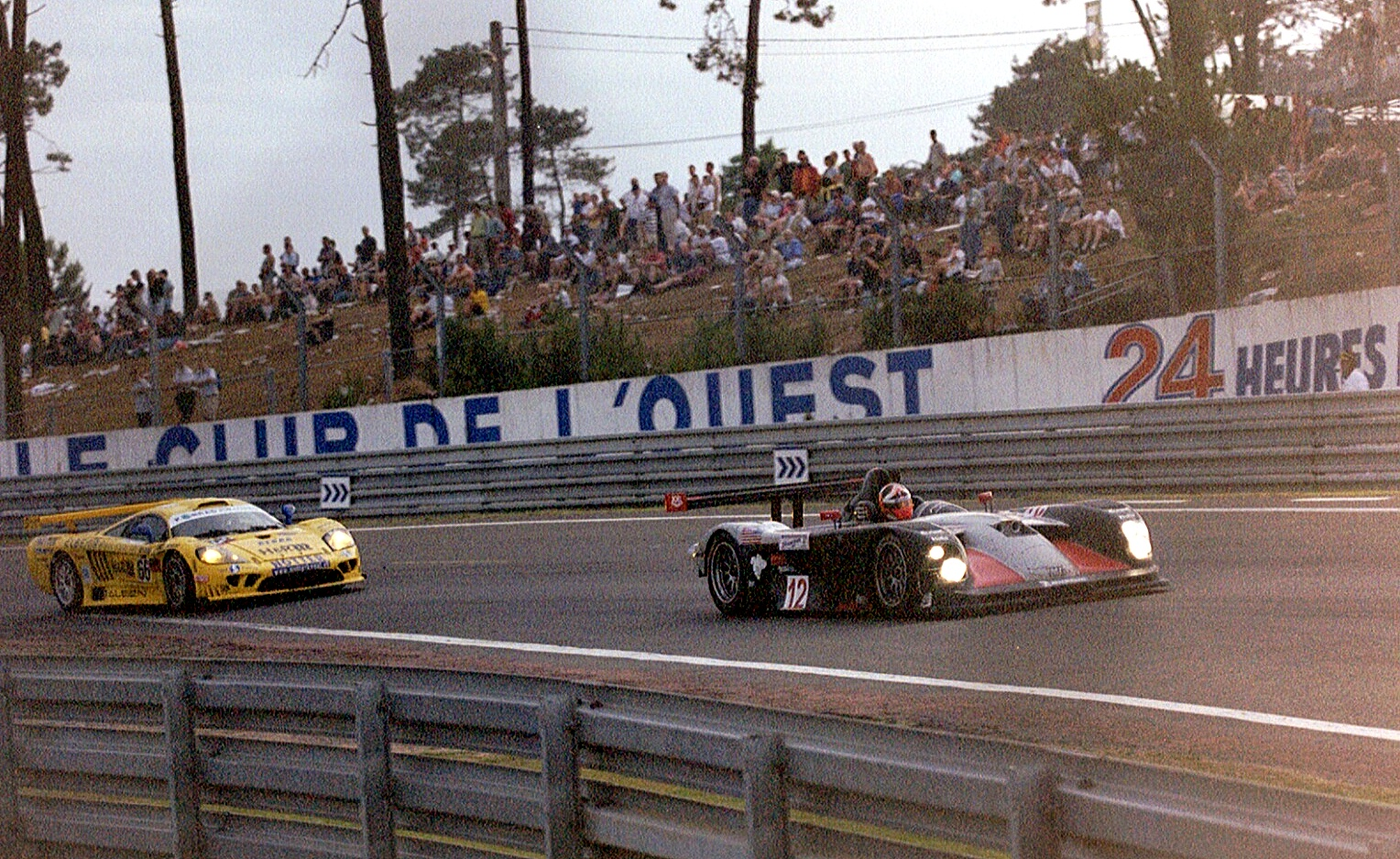
Leuenberger's Panoz LMP01 Evo leads a Saleen S7-R at the 2003 24 Hours of Le Mans.

In 2003, Leuenberger joined JML Team Panoz to compete in select rounds of the American Le Mans Series in the LMP900 class. In his four starts, Leuenberger took a best result of fourth at both Road America and Petit Le Mans to take 13th in points, in a year in which he also made his 24 Hours of Le Mans debut with the same team alongside David Saelens and Scott Maxwell. The following year, Leuenberger joined Taurus Sports Racing to drive a Lola B2K/10 in select rounds of the LMP1 class of the Le Mans Endurance Series, as well as the 24 Hours of Le Mans. During 2004, Leuenberger also joined Doran Lista Racing for two races of the Rolex Sports Car Series in the DP class.

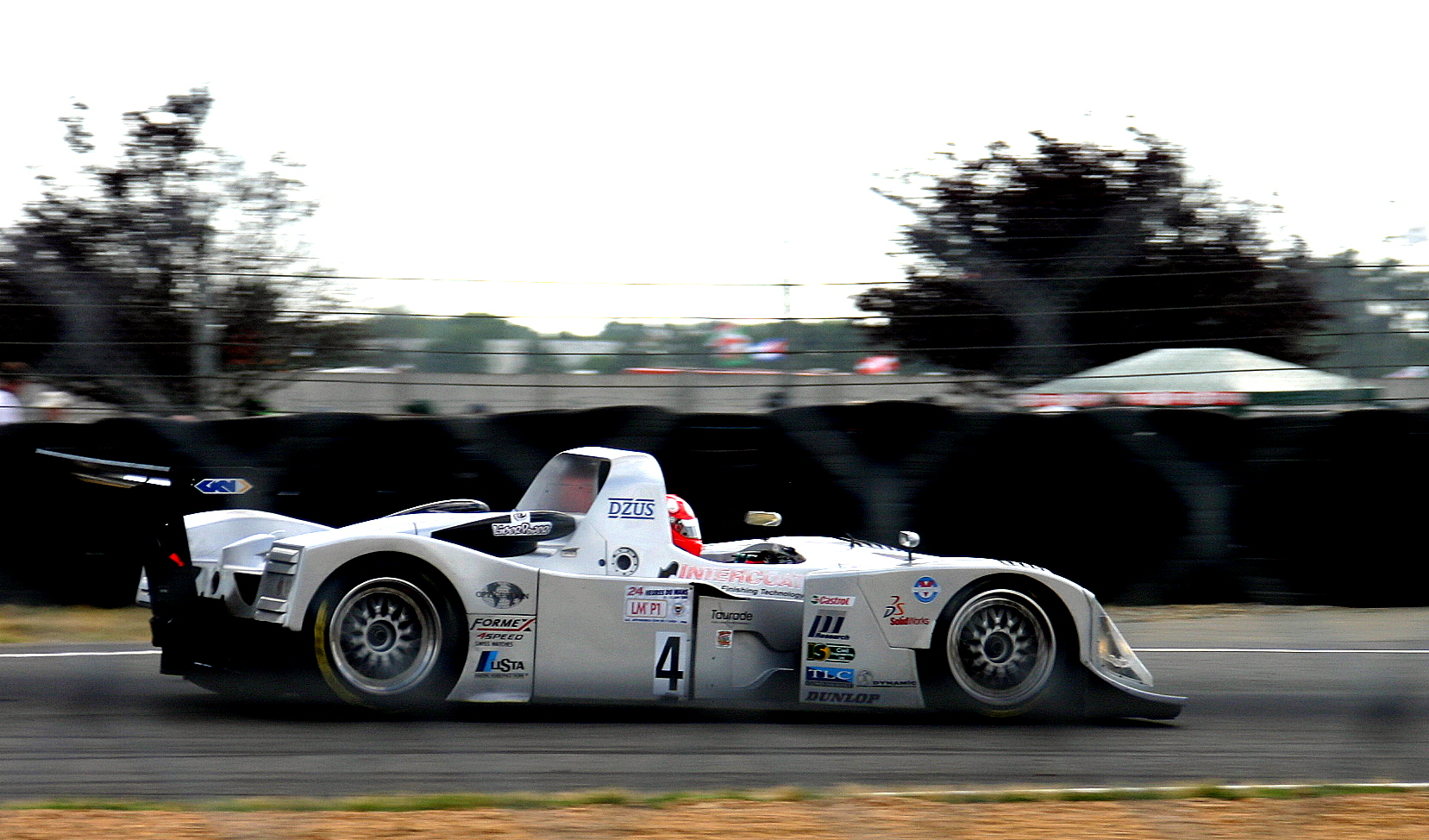
Leuenberger driving Taurus' LMP1 at Le Mans in 2004.

With no racing plans lined up for 2005, Leuenberger joined Creation Autosportif to be a test driver for their LMP1 programme, before being called on the eve of the Le Mans Endurance Series season to drive Paul Belmondo Racing's Chrysler Viper GTS-R in GT1. Competing in three of the five races alongside Pierre Perret, Leuenberger scored a best result of sixth at the Nürburgring. Continuing in GT1 machinery for 2006, Leuenberger joined Lamborghini-fielding Münnich Motorsport to compete part-time in the FIA GT Championship and the Le Mans Series. Between the two campaigns, Leuenberger most notably finished eighth at Dijon in the former, scoring his only points finish in FIA GT. Switching to ADAC GT Masters in 2007, Leuenberger split the season between Lamborghini-aligned Waiblinger Motorsport Club and Porsche-aligned Carsport Racing, taking a best result of seventh once with each team.

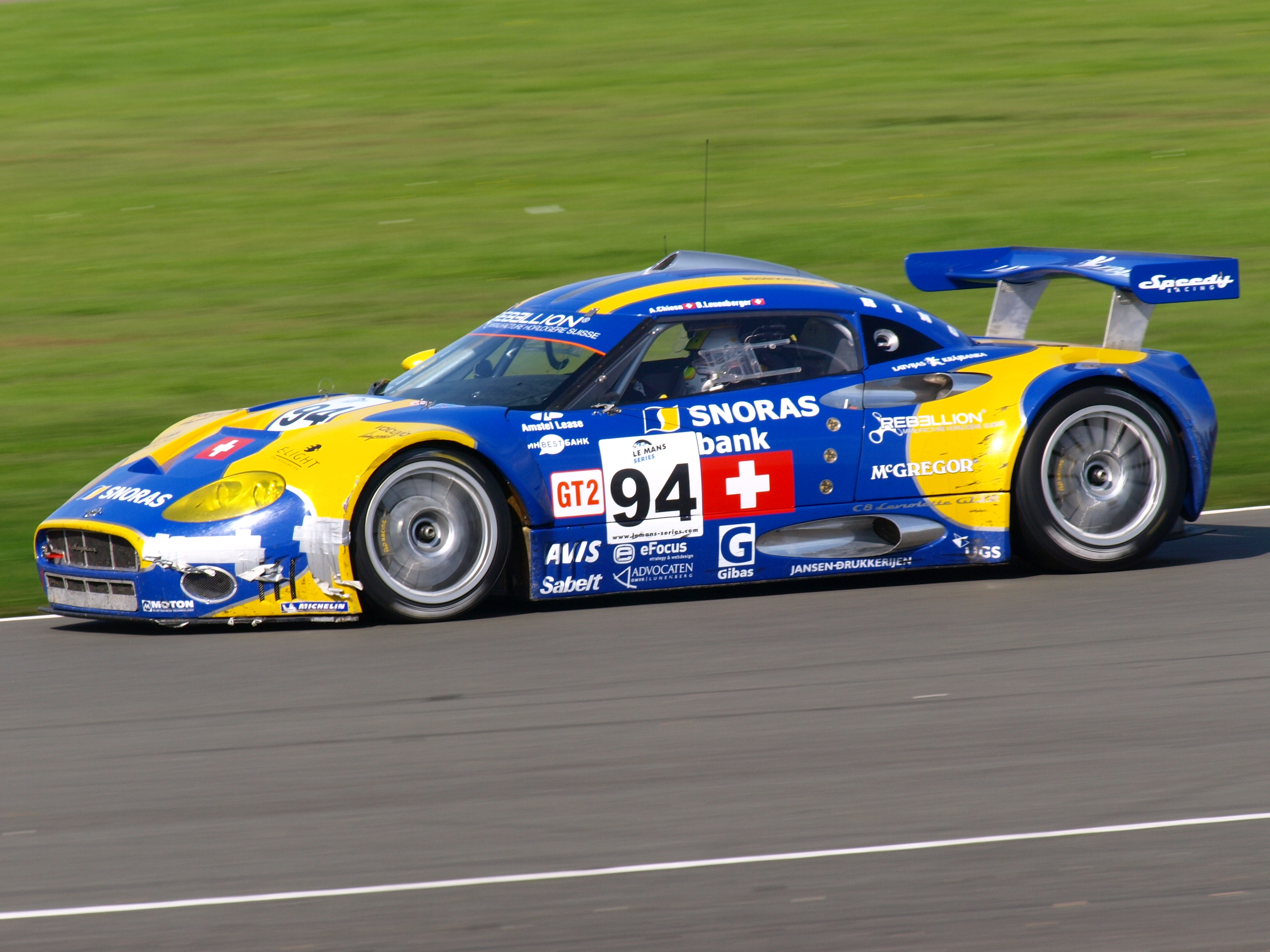
Leuenberger racing Speedy's Spyker C8 at Silverstone in 2008.

The following year, Leuenberger switched to Speedy Racing Team to drive a Spyker C8 in the GT2 class of the Le Mans Series and the 24 Hours of Le Mans. In his only season in GT2 machinery, Leuenberger took a best result of fourth at both Monza and Spa en route to a ninth-place points finish. Stepping up to LMP2 with Speedy in 2009, Leuenberger finished second at Spa and won the Silverstone finale with Jonny Kane and Xavier Pompidou to secure fourth in the standings. He also finished second at the 24 Hours of Le Mans with the pair, and deputised for Jaroslav Janiš in the LMS opener for Spyker's GT2 squad.

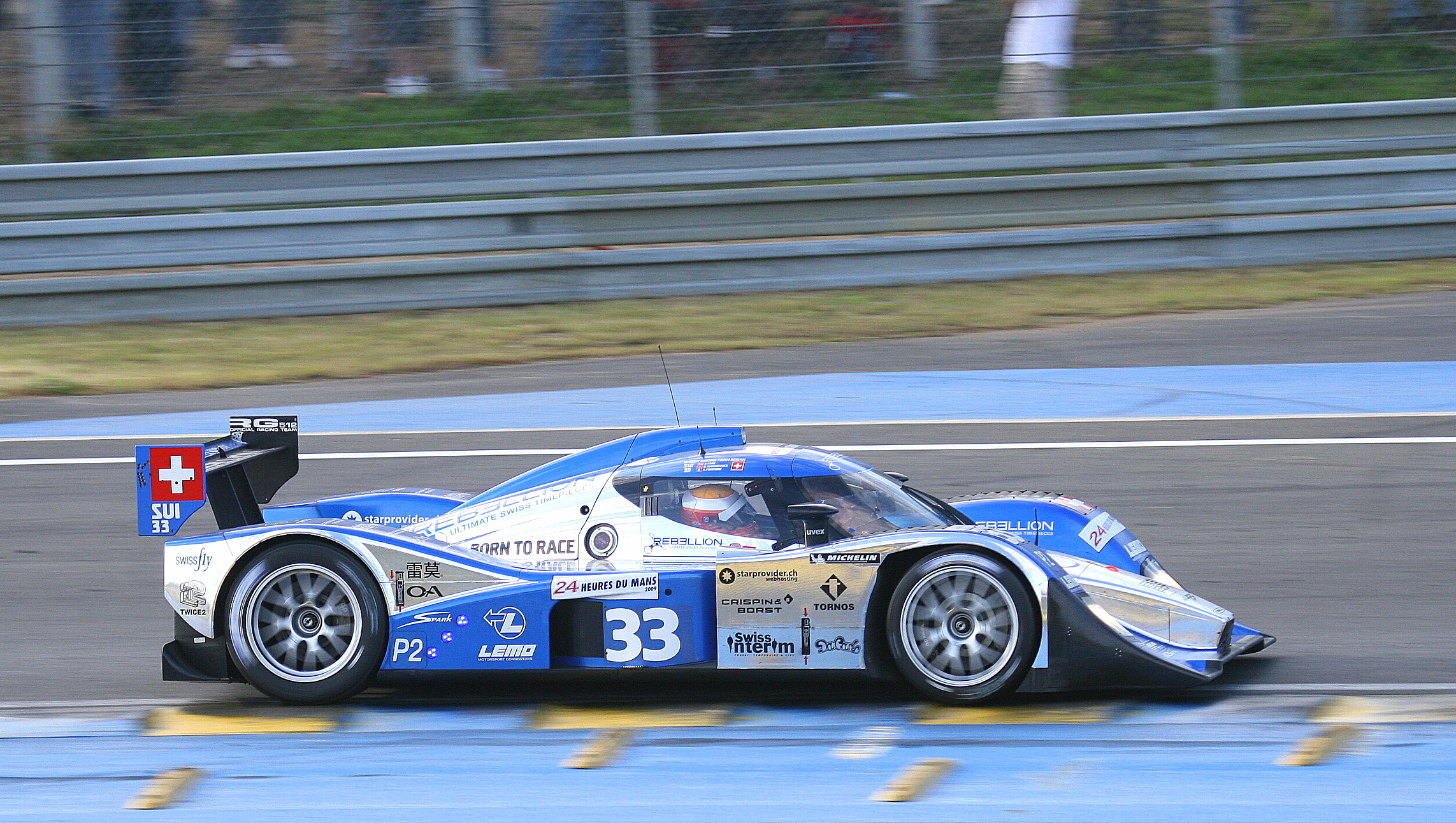
Leuenberger was second in LMP2 at the 2009 24 Hours of Le Mans for Speedy Racing Team Sebah.

Over the following two seasons, Leuenberger featured for Panoz in their GT2-spec Abruzzi in the American Le Mans Series. After the car never left the tent at the 2010 Petit Le Mans, Leuenberger's 12 Hours of Sebring only lasted 19 laps due to mechanical issues, in what was his last start in the series. Leuenberger also made his 24 Hours of Nürburgring debut for Rikli Motorsport in 2010, before joining Lamborghini-affiliated DKR Engineering for the Chinese rounds of the 2011 FIA GT1 World Championship. Two years later, Leuenberger made a one-off return to racing, competing in the V3 class of the 24 Hours of Nürburgring for Toyota Swiss Racing Team.

== Karting record ==
=== Karting career summary ===
Season	Series	Team	Position
1998	Swiss Championship — A-150		9th
1998	KIA Cup — Liz. 155 kg		11th

== Racing record ==
=== Racing career summary ===
Season	Series	Team	Races	Wins	Poles	F/Laps	Podiums	Points	Position
1999	Formula BMW ADAC – Junior		20	7	1	0	10	228	**1st**
2000	Formula BMW ADAC	BMW Rookie Team	19	1	0	0	2	92	8th
2001	Formula Renault 2000 Eurocup	JD Motorsport	9	0	0	0	1	36	16th
2001	Formula Renault 2.0 Germany	JD Motorsport	5	0	0	0	1	44	18th
2002	Porsche Carrera Cup Germany	Carsport Racing	9	0	0	0	0	25	14th
2002	Porsche Supercup	Carsport Supercup Team Swiss	1	0	0	0	0	0	NC†
2002	Formula Renault 2.0 Germany	ma-con	2	0	0	0	0	0	38th
2002	V8Star Series	PoleVision Racing	2	0	0	0	0	42	24th
2003	American Le Mans Series – LMP900	JML Team Panoz	4	0	0	0	0	43	13th
2003	24 Hours of Le Mans – LMP900	JML Team Panoz	1	0	0	0	0	—N/a	DNF
2004	Le Mans Endurance Series – LMP1	Taurus Sports Racing	0	0	0	0	0	0	NC
2004	24 Hours of Le Mans – LMP1	Taurus Sports Racing	1	0	0	0	0	—N/a	8th
2004	Rolex Sports Car Series – Protoype	Doran Lista Racing	2	0	0	0	0	45	43rd
2005	Le Mans Endurance Series – LMP1	Creation Autosportif	Test driver						
2005	Le Mans Endurance Series – GT1	Paul Belmondo Racing	3	0	0	0	0	3	24th
2006	FIA GT Championship – GT1	B-Racing RS Line Team	1	0	0	0	0	1	31st
2006	FIA GT Championship – GT1	All-Inkl.com Racing	2	0	0	0	0	1	31st
2006	Le Mans Series – GT1	B-Racing RS Line Team	1	0	0	0	0	0	NC
2007	ADAC GT Masters	Waiblinger Motorsport Club	4	0	0	0	0	7	15th
2007	ADAC GT Masters	Carsport Racing Swiss	5	0	0	0	0	7	15th
2008	Le Mans Series – GT2	Speedy Racing Team	5	0	0	0	0	11	9th
2008	24 Hours of Le Mans – GT2	Speedy Racing Team	1	0	0	0	0	—N/a	DNF
2009	Le Mans Series – GT2	Snoras Spyker Squadron	1	0	0	0	0	0	NC
2009	Le Mans Series – LMP2	Speedy Racing Team Sebah	4	1	0	0	2	22	4th
2009	24 Hours of Le Mans – LMP2	Speedy Racing Team Sebah	1	0	0	0	1	—N/a	**2nd**
2010	24 Hours of Nürburgring – SP3	Rikli Motorsport	1	0	0	0	0	—N/a	DNF
2010	American Le Mans Series – GT	Panoz Team	0	0	0	0	0	0	NC
2011	American Le Mans Series – GT	Panoz Racing	1	0	0	0	0	0	NC
2011	FIA GT1 World Championship	DKR www-discount.de	4	0	0	0	0	2	29th
2013	24 Hours of Nürburgring – V3	Toyota Swiss Racing Team	1	0	0	0	0	—N/a	6th

* Season still in progress.

^{†} As Leuenberger was a guest driver, he was ineligible for points.

=== Complete Formula Renault 2.0 Eurocup results ===
(key) (Races in bold indicate pole position) (Races in italics indicate fastest lap)

Year	Entrant	1	2	3	4	5	6	7	8	9	10	DC	Points
2001	JD Motorsport	MNZ; 15	BRN; 28	MAG; Ret	SIL; 23	ZOL; 7	HUN; 11	A1R; 7	NÜR; 3	JAR	EST; Ret	16th	36

=== Complete American Le Mans Series results ===
(key) (Races in bold indicate pole position)

Year	Team	Class	Make	Engine	1	2	3	4	5	6	7	8	9	Rank	Points
2003	JML Team Panoz	LMP900	Panoz LMP01 Evo	Élan 6L8 6.0L V8	SEB; 8	ATL	SON; 5	TRO	MOS	ELK; 4	LGA; DNS	MIA	PET; 4	13th	43
2010	Panoz Racing	GT	Panoz Abruzzi	Chevrolet 6.5 L V8	SEB	LBH	LAG	UTA	LRP	MDO	ELK	MOS	PET; DNA	NC	0
2011	Panoz Racing	GT	Panoz Abruzzi	Chevrolet 6.5 L V8	SEB; Ret	LBH	LRP	MOS	MDO	ELK	BAL	LAG	PET	NC	0

=== Complete 24 Hours of Le Mans results ===
Year	Team	Co-Drivers	Car	Class	Laps	Pos.	Class Pos.
2003	(United States) JML Team Panoz	(Belgium) David Saelens (Canada) Scott Maxwell	Panoz LMP01 Evo	LMP900	233	DNF	DNF
2004	(United Kingdom) Taurus Sports Racing	(United Kingdom) Christian Vann (France) Didier André	Lola B2K/10-Judd	LMP1	300	20th	8th
2008	(Switzerland) Speedy Racing Team	(Switzerland) Andrea Chiesa (Switzerland) Iradj Alexander	Spyker C8 Laviolette GT2-R	GT2	72	DNF	DNF
2009	(Switzerland) Speedy Racing Team (United Kingdom) Sebah Automotive	(United Kingdom) Jonny Kane (France) Xavier Pompidou	Lola B08/80-Judd	LMP2	343	12th	**2nd**

=== Complete European Le Mans Series results ===
(key) (Races in bold indicate pole position; results in italics indicate fastest lap)

Year	Entrant	Class	Chassis	Engine	1	2	3	4	5	Rank	Points
2004	Taurus Sports	LMP1	Lola B2K/10	Judd GV4 4.0 L V10	MNZ; DNS	NUR	SIL; DNA	SPA		NC	0
2005	Paul Belmondo Racing	GT1	Chrysler Viper GTS-R	Chrysler EWB 8.0 L V10	SPA; NC	MNZ; Ret	SIL; DNS	NÜR; 6	IST; DNA	24th	3
2006	B-Racing RS Line Team	GT1	Lamborghini Murciélago R-GT	Lamborghini L535 6.0L V12	IST	SPA; Ret	NUR	DON	JAR	NC	0
2008	Speedy Racing Team	GT2	Spyker C8 Laviolette GT2-R	Audi 4.0 L V8	CAT; Ret	MNZ; 4	SPA; 4	NUR; Ret	SIL; 8	9th	11
2009	Snoras Spyker Squadron	GT2	Spyker C8 Laviolette GT2-R	Audi 4.0 L V8	CAT; Ret					NC	0
2009	Speedy Racing Team Sebah	LMP2	Lola B08/80	Judd DB 3.4 L V8	CAT; WD	SPA; 2	ALG; 5	NUR; 7	SIL; 1	4th	22

=== Complete Grand-Am Rolex Sports Car Series results ===
(key) (Races in bold indicate pole position; results in italics indicate fastest lap)

Year	Team	Class	Make	Engine	1	2	3	4	5	6	7	8	9	10	11	12	Rank	Points
2004	Doran Lista Racing	P	Doran JE4	Lexus 4.3 L V8	DAY	MIA	PHX	MTR	WGL	DAY; 10	MOH; 7	WGL	MIA	VIR	BAR	FON	43rd	45

=== Complete FIA GT Championship results ===
(key) (Races in bold indicate pole position) (Races in italics indicate fastest lap)

Year	Team	Car	Class	1	2	3	4	5	6	7	8	9	10	11	12	Pos.	Pts
2006	B-Racing RS Line Team	Lamborghini Murciélago R-GT	GT1	SIL; Ret	BRN	OSC	SPA; 6H	SPA; 12H	SPA; 24H	LEC						31st	1
2006	All-Inkl.com Racing	Lamborghini Murciélago R-GT	GT1								DIJ; 8	MUG; Ret	HUN	ADR	DUB	31st	1

=== Complete ADAC GT Masters results ===
(key) (Races in bold indicate pole position) (Races in italics indicate fastest lap)

Year	Team	Car	1	2	3	4	5	6	7	8	9	10	11	12	DC	Points
2007	Waiblinger Motorsport Club	Lamborghini Gallardo GT3	NÜR; 1; 10	NÜR; 2; 9			LAU; 1; 10	LAU; 2; 7	ZOL; 1	ZOL; 2					15th	7
2007	Carsport Racing Swiss	Porsche 911 GT3 Cup			OSC; 1 Ret	OSC; 2 Ret					SAC; 1; 7	SAC; 2; 10	HOC; 1	HOC; 2; 15	15th	7

=== Complete FIA GT1 World Championship results ===
Year	Team	Car	1	2	3	4	5	6	7	8	9	10	11	12	13	14	15	16	17	18	19	20	Pos.	Pts
2011	DKR www-discount.de	Lamborghini	ABU; QR	ABU; CR	ZOL; QR	ZOL; CR	ALG; QR	ALG; CR	SAC; QR	SAC; CR	SIL; QR	SIL; CR	NAV; QR	NAV; CR	LEC; QR	LEC; CR	ORD; QR; 12	ORD; CR; 15	BEI; QR; 13	BEI; CR; 9	SAN; QR	SAN; CR	29th	2
