= 2011 Grand Prix of Mosport =

Mosport International Raceway

The 2011 Mobil 1 presents the Grand Prix of Mosport was held at Mosport International Raceway on July 24, 2011. It was the fourth round of the 2011 American Le Mans Series.

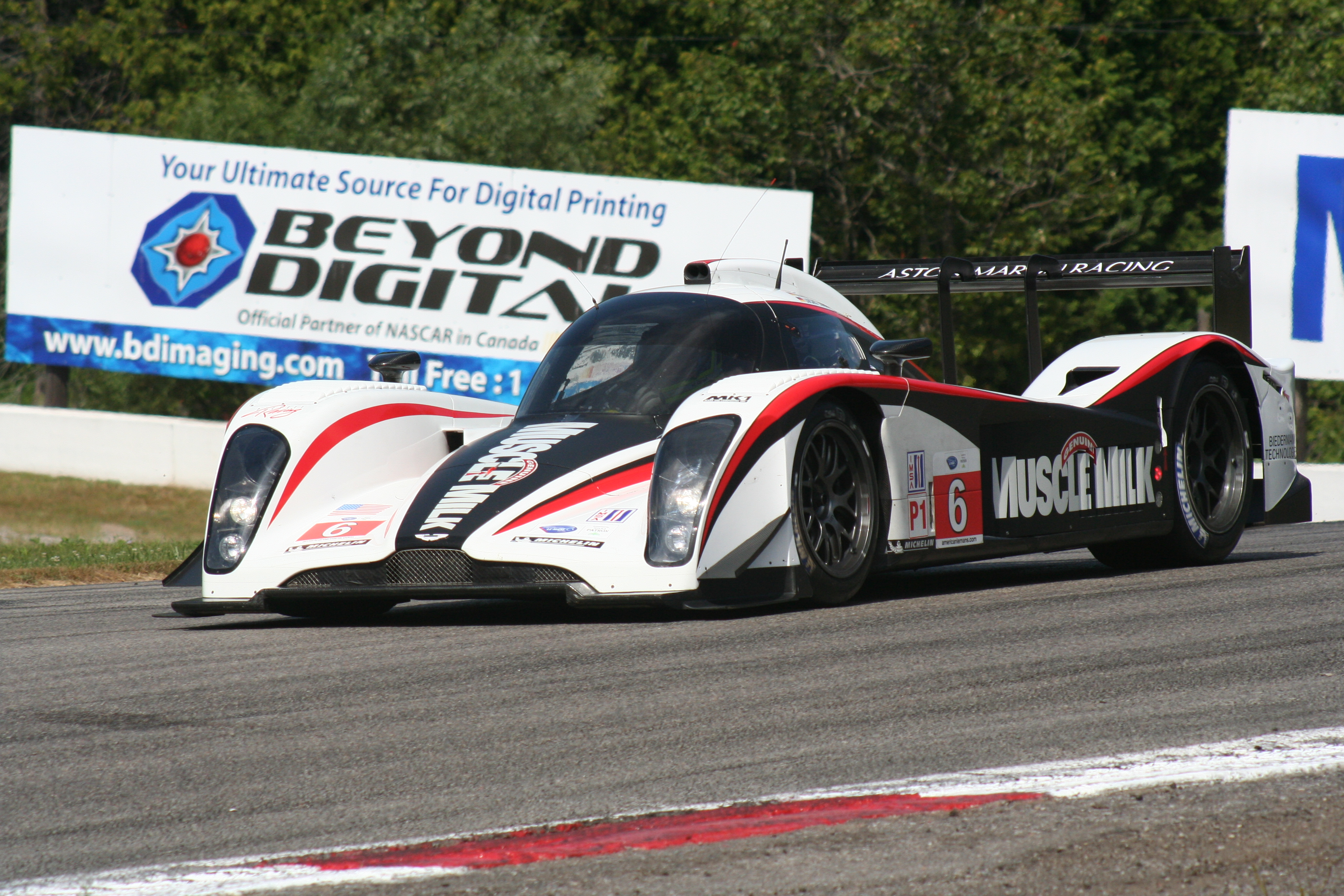
Muscle Milk Aston Martin Racing Lola-Aston Martin B08 62 - Winner 2011 Grand Prix of Mosport

== Qualifying ==
=== Qualifying result ===
Pole position winners in each class are marked in bold.

Pos	Class	Team	Driver	Lap Time	Grid
1	**LMP1**	**#6 Muscle Milk Aston Martin Racing**	**Klaus Graf**	**1:08.679**	**1**
2	LMP1	#16 Dyson Racing Team	Chris Dyson	1:09.044	2
3	LMP1	#20 Oryx Dyson Racing	Steven Kane	1:09.078	3
4	**LMPC**	**#89 Intersport Racing**	**Kyle Marcelli**	**1:11.331**	**4**
5	LMPC	#06 CORE Autosport	Gunnar Jeannette	1:11.946	5
6	LMPC	#37 Intersport Racing	Jon Field	1:12.252	6
7	LMPC	#05 CORE Autosport	Frankie Montecalvo	1:12.827	7
8	LMP1	#12 Autocon	Tony Burgess	1:12.839	8
9	LMPC	#18 Performance Tech Motorsports	Anthony Nicolosi	1:13.049	9
10	LMPC	#63 Genoa Racing	Eric Lux	1:13.085	10
11	**GT**	**#56 BMW Team RLL**	**Dirk Müller**	**1:17.083**	**11**
12	GT	#55 BMW Team RLL	Bill Auberlen	1:17.142	12
13	GT	#45 Flying Lizard Motorsports	Jörg Bergmeister	1:17.312	13
14	GT	#01 Extreme Speed Motorsports	Scott Sharp	1:17.511	14
15	GT	#62 Risi Competizione	Toni Vilander	1:17.543	15
16	GT	#4 Corvette Racing	Jan Magnussen	1:17.580	16
17	GT	#17 Team Falken Tire	Wolf Henzler	1:17.964	17
18	GT	#3 Corvette Racing	Olivier Beretta	1:17.997	18
19	GT	#04 Robertson Racing	David Murry	1:18.847	19
20	UNC	#50 Panoz Racing	Ian James	1:19.243	20
21	GT	#98 JaguarRSR	Rocky Moran Jr.	1:19.302	21
22	GT	#48 Paul Miller Racing	Bryce Miller	1:20.377	22
23	GT	#02 Extreme Speed Motorsports	Ed Brown	1:21.051	23
24	GT	#99 JaguarRSR	Ken Wilden	1:22.653	31
25	GT	#44 Flying Lizard Motorsports	Seth Neiman	1:22.693	24
26	**GTC**	**#54 Black Swan Racing**	**Damien Faulkner**	**1:22.861**	**25**
27	GTC	#66 TRG	Spencer Pumpelly	1:22.939	26
28	GTC	#11 JDX Racing	Nick Ham	1:23.448	27
29	GT	#40 Robertson Racing	Andrea Robertson	1:23.530	28
30	GTC	#23 Alex Job Racing	Brian Wong	1:23.787	29
31	GTC	#68 TRG	Dion von Moltke	1:23.825	30

== Race ==
=== Race result ===
Class winners in bold. Cars failing to complete 70% of their class winner's distance are marked as Not Classified (NC).

Pos	Class	No	Team	Drivers	Chassis	Tire	Laps
Pos	Class	No	Team	Drivers	Engine	Tire	Laps
1	**LMP1**	**6**	**(United States) Muscle Milk Aston Martin Racing**	**(Germany) Klaus Graf (Germany) Lucas Luhr**	**Lola-Aston Martin B08/62**	MI	**129**
1	**LMP1**	**6**	**(United States) Muscle Milk Aston Martin Racing**	**(Germany) Klaus Graf (Germany) Lucas Luhr**	**Aston Martin 6.0 L V12**	MI	**129**
2	LMP1	16	(United States) Dyson Racing Team	(United States) Chris Dyson (United Kingdom) Guy Smith	Lola B09/86	D	129
2	LMP1	16	(United States) Dyson Racing Team	(United States) Chris Dyson (United Kingdom) Guy Smith	Mazda MZR-R 2.0 L Turbo I4 (Isobutanol)	D	129
3	LMP1	20	(United States) Oryx Dyson Racing	(United Arab Emirates) Humaid Al Masaood (United Kingdom) Steven Kane	Lola B09/86	D	127
3	LMP1	20	(United States) Oryx Dyson Racing	(United Arab Emirates) Humaid Al Masaood (United Kingdom) Steven Kane	Mazda MZR-R 2.0 L Turbo I4 (Isobutanol)	D	127
4	**LMPC**	**06**	**(United States) CORE Autosport**	**(United States) Gunnar Jeannette (Mexico) Ricardo González**	**Oreca FLM09**	MI	**125**
4	**LMPC**	**06**	**(United States) CORE Autosport**	**(United States) Gunnar Jeannette (Mexico) Ricardo González**	**Chevrolet LS3 6.2 L V8**	MI	**125**
5	LMPC	05	(United States) CORE Autosport	(United States) Jon Bennett (United States) Frankie Montecalvo	Oreca FLM09	MI	123
5	LMPC	05	(United States) CORE Autosport	(United States) Jon Bennett (United States) Frankie Montecalvo	Chevrolet LS3 6.2 L V8	MI	123
6	LMPC	63	(United States) Genoa Racing	(United States) Eric Lux (Germany) Christian Zugel	Oreca FLM09	MI	123
6	LMPC	63	(United States) Genoa Racing	(United States) Eric Lux (Germany) Christian Zugel	Chevrolet LS3 6.2 L V8	MI	123
7	LMPC	37	(United States) Intersport Racing	(United States) Jon Field (Puerto Rico) Ricardo Vera	Oreca FLM09	MI	122
7	LMPC	37	(United States) Intersport Racing	(United States) Jon Field (Puerto Rico) Ricardo Vera	Chevrolet LS3 6.2 L V8	MI	122
8	**GT**	**4**	**(United States) Corvette Racing**	**(United Kingdom) Oliver Gavin (Denmark) Jan Magnussen**	**Chevrolet Corvette C6.R**	MI	**121**
8	**GT**	**4**	**(United States) Corvette Racing**	**(United Kingdom) Oliver Gavin (Denmark) Jan Magnussen**	**Chevrolet 5.5 L V8**	MI	**121**
9	GT	62	(United States) Risi Competizione	(Brazil) Jaime Melo (Finland) Toni Vilander	Ferrari 458 Italia GT2	MI	121
9	GT	62	(United States) Risi Competizione	(Brazil) Jaime Melo (Finland) Toni Vilander	Ferrari 4.5 L V8	MI	121
10	GT	55	(United States) BMW Team RLL	(United States) Bill Auberlen (Germany) Dirk Werner	BMW M3 GT2	D	121
10	GT	55	(United States) BMW Team RLL	(United States) Bill Auberlen (Germany) Dirk Werner	BMW 4.0 L V8	D	121
11	GT	56	(United States) BMW Team RLL	(Germany) Dirk Müller (United States) Joey Hand	BMW M3 GT2	D	121
11	GT	56	(United States) BMW Team RLL	(Germany) Dirk Müller (United States) Joey Hand	BMW 4.0 L V8	D	121
12	GT	17	(United States) Team Falken Tire	(Germany) Wolf Henzler (United States) Bryan Sellers	Porsche 997 GT3-RSR	FAL	120
12	GT	17	(United States) Team Falken Tire	(Germany) Wolf Henzler (United States) Bryan Sellers	Porsche 4.0 L Flat-6	FAL	120
13	LMPC	18	(United States) Performance Tech Motorsports	(United States) Anthony Nicolosi (United States) Jarrett Boon	Oreca FLM09	MI	119
13	LMPC	18	(United States) Performance Tech Motorsports	(United States) Anthony Nicolosi (United States) Jarrett Boon	Chevrolet LS3 6.2 L V8	MI	119
14	GT	3	(United States) Corvette Racing	(Monaco) Olivier Beretta (United States) Tommy Milner	Chevrolet Corvette C6.R	MI	119
14	GT	3	(United States) Corvette Racing	(Monaco) Olivier Beretta (United States) Tommy Milner	Chevrolet 5.5 L V8	MI	119
15	GT	04	(United States) Robertson Racing	(United States) David Murry (United States) Anthony Lazzaro	Ford GT-R Mk.VII	MI	119
15	GT	04	(United States) Robertson Racing	(United States) David Murry (United States) Anthony Lazzaro	Élan 5.0 L V8	MI	119
16	GT	44	(United States) Flying Lizard Motorsports	(United States) Seth Neiman (Germany) Marco Holzer	Porsche 997 GT3-RSR	MI	118
16	GT	44	(United States) Flying Lizard Motorsports	(United States) Seth Neiman (Germany) Marco Holzer	Porsche 4.0 L Flat-6	MI	118
17	UNC	50	(United States) Panoz Racing	(United Kingdom) Ian James (Sweden) Edward Sandström	Panoz Abruzzi	MI	117
17	UNC	50	(United States) Panoz Racing	(United Kingdom) Ian James (Sweden) Edward Sandström	Chevrolet 6.5 L V8	MI	117
18	GT	01	(United States) Extreme Speed Motorsports	(United States) Scott Sharp (United States) Johannes van Overbeek	Ferrari 458 Italia GT2	MI	117
18	GT	01	(United States) Extreme Speed Motorsports	(United States) Scott Sharp (United States) Johannes van Overbeek	Ferrari 4.5 L V8	MI	117
19	GT	48	(United States) Paul Miller Racing	(United States) Bryce Miller (Germany) Sascha Maassen	Porsche 997 GT3-RSR	Y	117
19	GT	48	(United States) Paul Miller Racing	(United States) Bryce Miller (Germany) Sascha Maassen	Porsche 4.0 L Flat-6	Y	117
20	GT	98	(United States) JaguarRSR	(United States) P. J. Jones (United States) Rocky Moran Jr.	Jaguar XKR GT	D	116
20	GT	98	(United States) JaguarRSR	(United States) P. J. Jones (United States) Rocky Moran Jr.	Jaguar 5.0 L V8	D	116
21	GT	45	(United States) Flying Lizard Motorsports	(Germany) Jörg Bergmeister (United States) Patrick Long	Porsche 997 GT3-RSR	MI	113
21	GT	45	(United States) Flying Lizard Motorsports	(Germany) Jörg Bergmeister (United States) Patrick Long	Porsche 4.0 L Flat-6	MI	113
22	**GTC**	**66**	**(United States) TRG**	**(United States) Duncan Ende (United States) Spencer Pumpelly**	**Porsche 997 GT3 Cup**	Y	**112**
22	**GTC**	**66**	**(United States) TRG**	**(United States) Duncan Ende (United States) Spencer Pumpelly**	**Porsche 4.0 L Flat-6**	Y	**112**
23	GTC	68	(United States) TRG	(South Africa) Dion von Moltke (United States) Marc Bunting	Porsche 997 GT3 Cup	Y	112
23	GTC	68	(United States) TRG	(South Africa) Dion von Moltke (United States) Marc Bunting	Porsche 4.0 L Flat-6	Y	112
24	GT	02	(United States) Extreme Speed Motorsports	(United States) Ed Brown (United States) Guy Cosmo	Ferrari 458 Italia GT2	MI	112
24	GT	02	(United States) Extreme Speed Motorsports	(United States) Ed Brown (United States) Guy Cosmo	Ferrari 4.5 L V8	MI	112
25	GTC	54	(United States) Black Swan Racing	(United States) Tim Pappas (Republic of Ireland) Damien Faulkner	Porsche 997 GT3 Cup	Y	111
25	GTC	54	(United States) Black Swan Racing	(United States) Tim Pappas (Republic of Ireland) Damien Faulkner	Porsche 4.0 L Flat-6	Y	111
26	GTC	23	(United States) Alex Job Racing	(United States) Bill Sweedler (United States) Brian Wong	Porsche 997 GT3 Cup	Y	111
26	GTC	23	(United States) Alex Job Racing	(United States) Bill Sweedler (United States) Brian Wong	Porsche 4.0 L Flat-6	Y	111
27	GTC	11	(United States) JDX Racing	(United States) Nick Ham (United States) Chris Cumming	Porsche 997 GT3 Cup	Y	111
27	GTC	11	(United States) JDX Racing	(United States) Nick Ham (United States) Chris Cumming	Porsche 4.0 L Flat-6	Y	111
28	GT	40	(United States) Robertson Racing	(United States) David Robertson (United States) Andrea Robertson	Ford GT-R Mk.VII	MI	109
28	GT	40	(United States) Robertson Racing	(United States) David Robertson (United States) Andrea Robertson	Élan 5.0 L V8	MI	109
29	GT	99	(United States) JaguarRSR	(Brazil) Bruno Junqueira (United States) Kenny Wilden	Jaguar XKR GT	D	97
29	GT	99	(United States) JaguarRSR	(Brazil) Bruno Junqueira (United States) Kenny Wilden	Jaguar 5.0 L V8	D	97
30 DNF	LMPC	89	(United States) Intersport Racing	(Canada) Kyle Marcelli (United States) Chapman Ducote	Oreca FLM09	MI	48
30 DNF	LMPC	89	(United States) Intersport Racing	(Canada) Kyle Marcelli (United States) Chapman Ducote	Chevrolet LS3 6.2 L V8	MI	48
31 DNF	LMP1	12	(United States) Autocon	(Canada) Tony Burgess (United States) Chris McMurry	Lola B06/10	D	39
31 DNF	LMP1	12	(United States) Autocon	(Canada) Tony Burgess (United States) Chris McMurry	AER P32C 4.0 L Turbo V8 (Isobutanol)	D	39
FINAL RACE REPORT

American Le Mans Series
Previous race: Northeast Grand Prix	2011 season	Next race: Mid-Ohio Sports Car Challenge
