= Lola-Aston Martin B09/60 =

Lola-Aston Martin B09/60 (Aston Martin DBR1-2)
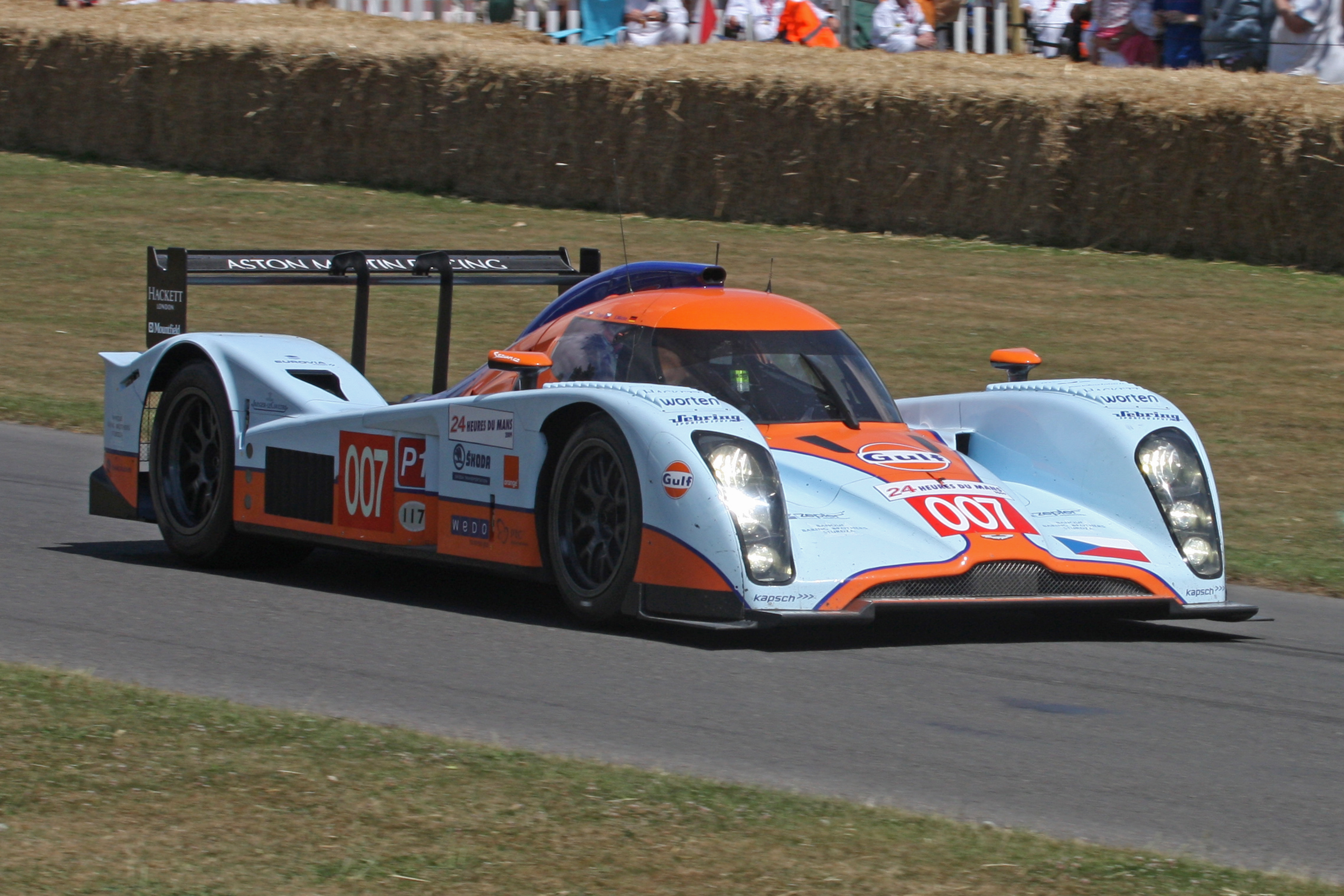
- The No. 007 B09/60 as shown in the 2009 Goodwood Festival of Speed
- Category: Le Mans Prototype LMP1
- Constructor: Lola Cars International; Prodrive
- Designers: Julian Sole; Marek Reichman
- Predecessor: Lola B08/60

Technical specifications
- Chassis: Carbon fibre monocoque
- Suspension (front): Double wishbone with adjustable Koni dampers
- Suspension (rear): Double wishbone with adjustable Koni dampers
- Length: 4,634 mm (182.4 in)
- Width: 1,990 mm (78.3 in)
- Axle track: 1,990 mm (78.3 in)
- Wheelbase: 2,890 mm (113.8 in)
- Engine: Aston Martin AM04 6,000 cc (370 cu in) 60° V12, DOHC, 94 x 71.96 mm (bore x stroke), naturally aspirated, mid-engined, longitudinally mounted
- Transmission: 6-speed sequential manual
- Power: 650 hp (480 kW)
- Weight: appr. 900 kg (2,000 lb)
- Fuel: Gulf
- Tyres: 18" Michelin

Competition history
- Notable entrants: (United Kingdom) Aston Martin Racing; (Czech Republic) AMR Eastern Europe; (France) Signature-Plus; (United States) Muscle Milk Aston Martin Racing
- Notable drivers: (Czech Republic) Tomáš Enge; (Czech Republic) Jan Charouz; (Germany) Stefan Mücke; (United Kingdom) Darren Turner; (Switzerland) Harold Primat; (Portugal) Miguel Ramos; (Mexico) Adrián Fernández; (Germany) Klaus Graf
- Debut: 2009 1000 km of Catalunya
Races	Wins	Poles	F/Laps
27	9	4	5
- Teams' Championships: 1 (2009 LMS)
- Constructors' Championships: 1 (2009 LMS)
- Drivers' Championships: 1 (2009 LMS)

The Lola-Aston Martin B09/60, also known as the Aston Martin DBR1-2, is a Le Mans Prototype sports car built by Lola Cars International and co-developed with Prodrive for use by Aston Martin Racing. It is the first prototype to bear the Aston Martin name since the AMR1 in 1989. Aston Martin's internal name for the car, DBR1-2, refers to the specific DBR1 chassis which won six races in 1959 en route to clinching the World Sportscar Championship as well as that year's 24 Hours of Le Mans.

== Development ==
The B09/60 is an evolution of the Lola B08/60 LMP1 design used by Aston Martin Racing in 2008. As before it uses the same racing prepared 6.0 L (370 cu in) V12 engine from the Aston Martin DBR9 GT1 car, but with larger air restrictors allowing for an increase of 50 hp (37 kW) due to using a production-based engine. This V12 is a little heavier, taller and longer than custom-built prototype racing engines. The standard Lola gearbox was replaced by a more compact Xtrac 6-speed which is operated with paddle-shifting. An unusual feature to the car is the rearward brake cooling, which feeds the air to the brakes through two fans, and eliminates brake ducts on the body.

== Racing history ==
Two B09/60s competed in the full Le Mans Series season, while a third car entered under the AMR Eastern Europe banner for Charouz Racing Systems also competed at the 2009 24 Hours of Le Mans and in the last three races of the LMS. The number 007 car won the Le Mans Series overall, and the number 009 finished fourth.

At Le Mans the B09/60 of Jan Charouz, Tomáš Enge and Stefan Mücke finished fourth behind the factory entries of Peugeot and Audi, as well as being the highest finishing petrol-fuelled car. The 008 car was running as high as 3rd overall in the morning until Anthony Davidson had a collision with a GT1 Aston Martin. Subsequent repairs and a 5-minute stop and go penalty—for causing the collision—dropped the car out of contention.

A Lola Aston Martin competed at the 2010 12 Hours of Sebring, which marked the first time the Lola - Aston Martin entered a race in the United States. The Lowe's-sponsored car finishing the race in 3rd position, three laps behind the two winning Peugeots. No factory cars were entered into the 2010 1000 km of Spa. Three cars were also entered into the 2010 24 Hours of Le Mans, although only the 007 and 009 cars were run by Aston Martin Racing; the 008 car was scheduled to be run by the French team Signature-Plus. Both the 008 and 009 cars suffered from problems and had to be retired, leaving only the 007 to finish 6th overall and completing 365 laps, less than it did in 2009. It was the third highest petrol finisher behind Oreca and the LMP2 winner Strakka HPD.

At the 1000 km of Silverstone, the Lola-Aston Martin finished 4th and the highest petrol finisher.

Lola-Aston Martin B09/60 at the Goodwood Festival of Speed

In 2011, the car was raced by Team Muscle Milk Team Cytosport in the American Le Mans Series with regular drivers Klaus Graf and Lucas Luhr. The team failed to finish the first round at the 12 Hours of Sebring, but rebounded by overtaking the polesitting Dyson Racing car at Long Beach to take the win.

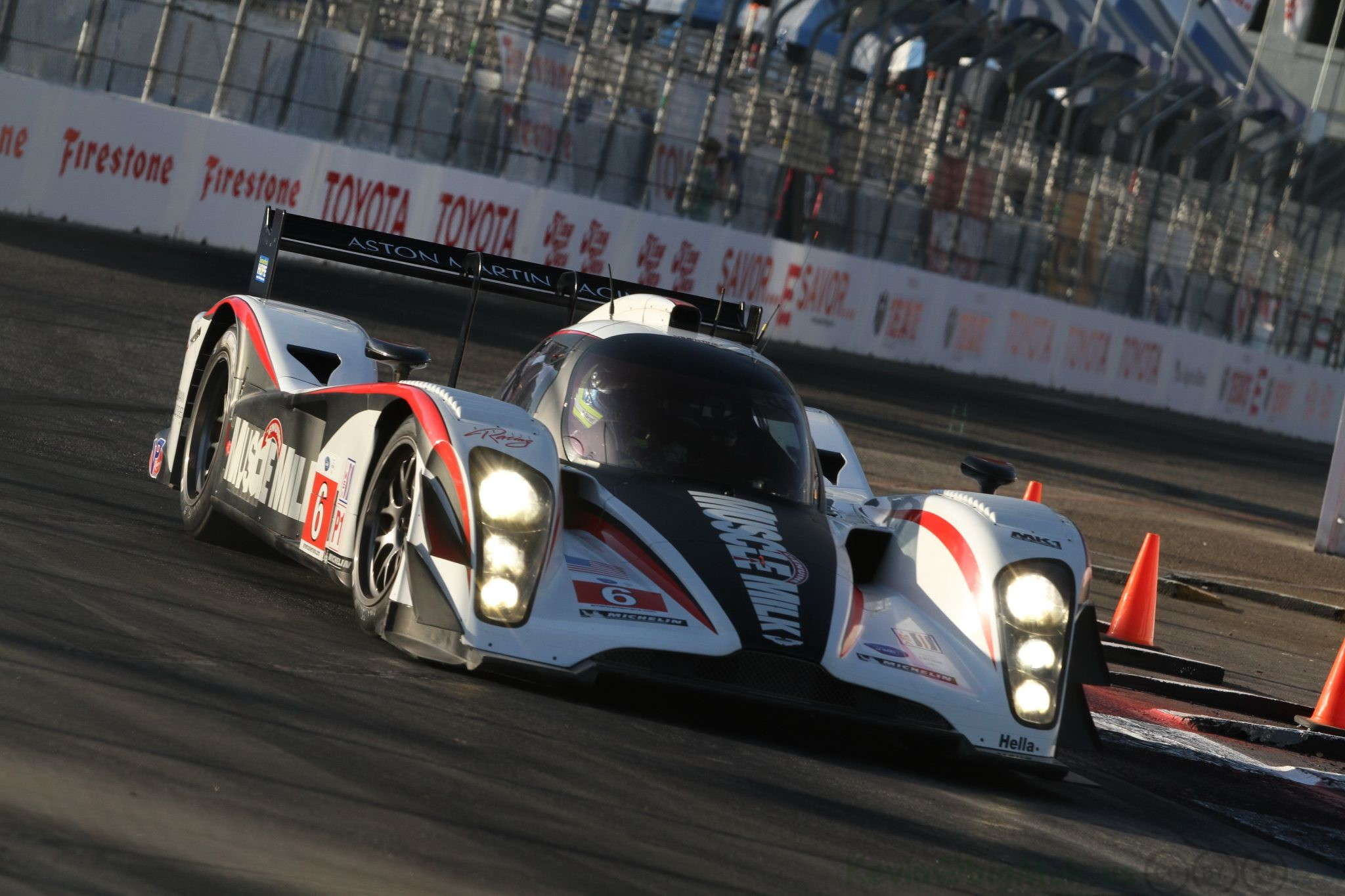
The No. 6 car took the victory at the 2011 Grand Prix of Mosport

The team went on to win again at Mosport, Mid-Ohio and Road America and finished the season in second place in the LMP1 category behind Dyson Racing.

With Aston Martin Racing switching to their new car, the AMR-One for the 2011 24 Hours of Le Mans, a B09/60 was entered by Kronos Racing in cooperation with fellow Belgian outfit Marc VDS Racing Team. The car was driven by Vanina Ickx, Bas Leinders and Maxime Martin and finished the race seventh overall, twenty-seven laps behind the race winning Audi R18 TDI.

After suffering reliability problems and a lack of speed with its new AMR-One prototype, Aston Martin Racing reverted to using a B09/60 for the final three rounds of the 2011 Intercontinental Le Mans Cup as well as round eight of the 2011 American Le Mans Series season, the American Le Mans Monterey at Mazda Raceway Laguna Seca.. The lone factory Aston started third behind the two Dyson Lola machines, but the race would end with the Aston winning by three laps, notching up another victory for the car. The car also got a surprise podium finish at Petit Le Mans after 3 of the 4 factory cars (Audi and Peugeot) crashed.

== Competition history ==
=== Complete Le Mans Series results ===
(key) Races in bold indicates pole position. Races in italics indicates fastest lap.

Complete Le Mans Series results
Year	Entrant	Class	Drivers	No.	Rds.	Rounds					Pts.	Pos.
Year	Entrant	Class	Drivers	No.	Rds.	1	2	3	4	5	Pts.	Pos.
2009	(United Kingdom) Aston Martin Racing	LMP1	(Czech Republic) Jan Charouz (Czech Republic) Tomáš Enge (Germany) Stefan Mücke	007	All; All; All	CAT; 1	SPA; 3	POR; 2	**NÜR**; **1**	SIL; 3	39	1st
2009	(United Kingdom) Aston Martin Racing	LMP1	(Switzerland) Harold Primat (United Kingdom) Darren Turner (Portugal) Miguel Ramos	009	All; All; 1-3	CAT; Ret	SPA; 5	POR; 5	NÜR; 2	SIL; 4	21	4th
2009	(Czech Republic) AMR Eastern Europe	LMP1	(United Kingdom) Chris Buncombe (United Kingdom) Stuart Hall (Portugal) Miguel Ramos	008	4-5; 4-5; 4-5	CAT	SPA	POR	NÜR; 3	SIL; 9	6	10th
2010	(United Kingdom) Aston Martin Racing	LMP1	(Mexico) Adrian Fernández (Switzerland) Harold Primat (United Kingdom) Andy Meyrick	007	5; 5; 5	LEC	SPA	POR	HUN	SIL; NC	NC	0
2010	(United Kingdom) Aston Martin Racing	LMP1	(Mexico) Adrian Fernández (Switzerland) Harold Primat (Germany) Stefan Mücke (United Kingdom) Sam Hancock (Denmark) Juan Barazi	009	1; 1; 1, 5; 5; 5	LEC; 2	SPA	POR	HUN	SIL; 4	38	6th
2010	(France) Signature Plus	LMP1	(France) Pierre Ragues (France) Franck Mailleux (Belgium) Vanina Ickx	008	All; All; All	LEC; 6	SPA; 8	POR; 3	HUN; 3	SIL; 6	55	2nd
2011	(United Kingdom) Aston Martin Racing	LMP1	(Mexico) Adrian Fernández (Switzerland) Harold Primat (Austria) Christian Klien	007	4; 4; 4	LEC	SPA	IMO	SIL; 9	EST	NC	0

=== Complete American Le Mans Series results ===
(key) Races in bold indicates pole position. Races in italics indicates fastest lap.

Complete American Le Mans Series results
Year	Entrant	Class	Drivers	No.	Rds.	Rounds									Pts.	Pos.
Year	Entrant	Class	Drivers	No.	Rds.	1	2	3	4	5	6	7	8	9	Pts.	Pos.
2010	(United Kingdom) Aston Martin Racing	LMP1	(Mexico) Adrian Fernández (Germany) Stefan Mücke (Switzerland) Harold Primat	007	1; 1; 1	SEB; 3								ATL	0	NC
2010	(United Kingdom) Aston Martin Racing	LMP	(Mexico) Adrian Fernández (Switzerland) Harold Primat	007	2; 2		**LBH**; **2**	LGA	MIL	LRP	MDO	ROA	MOS		0	NC
2011	(United States) Muscle Milk Aston Martin Racing	LMP1	(Germany) Klaus Graf (Germany) Lucas Luhr (France) Romain Dumas (United States) Greg Pickett	6	2-9; 2-6, 8-9; 7; 9		LBH; 1	LRP; 2	**MOS**; **1**	MDO; 1	**ELK**; **1**	BAL; 4	LAG; 5	ATL; DNF	124	2nd
2011	(United States) Muscle Milk Aston Martin Racing	LMP1	(United States) Greg Pickett (Germany) Klaus Graf (Germany) Lucas Luhr	06	1; 1; 1	SEB; DNF									124	2nd
2011	(United Kingdom) Aston Martin Racing	LMP1	(Mexico) Adrian Fernández (Germany) Stefan Mücke (Switzerland) Harold Primat	007	8-9; 8-9; 8-9	SEB	LBH	LRP	MOS	MDO	ROA	BAL	LGA; 1	ATL; 3	0	NC

=== Complete Intercontinental Le Mans Cup Results ===
(key) Races in bold indicates pole position. Races in italics indicates fastest lap.

Complete Intercontinental Le Mans Cup Results
Year	Entrant	Class	Drivers	No.	Rds.	Rounds							Pts.	Pos.
Year	Entrant	Class	Drivers	No.	Rds.	1	2	3	4	5	6	7	Pts.	Pos.
2011	(Belgium) Kronos Racing (Belgium) Marc VDS Racing Team	LMP1	(Belgium) Vanina Ickx (Belgium) Bas Leinders (Belgium) Maxime Martin	22	3; 3; 3	SEB	SPA	LMS; 7	IMO	SIL	ATL	ZHU	0	NC
2011	(United Kingdom) Aston Martin Racing	LMP1	(Austria) Christian Klien (Mexico) Adrian Fernández (Switzerland) Harold Primat (Germany) Stefan Mücke (United Kingdom) Andy Meyrick	007	5; 5-6; 5-7; 6-7; 7	SEB	SPA	LMS	IMO	SIL; 9	ATL; 3	ZHU; 6	22	6th

=== 24 Hours of Le Mans results ===
Year	Team	Drivers	Car #	Class	Laps	Pos.	Class Pos.
2009	(Czech Republic) AMR Eastern Europe	(Czech Republic) Jan Charouz (Czech Republic) Tomas Enge (Germany) Stefan Mucke	007	LMP1	373	4th	4th
2009	(United Kingdom) Aston Martin Racing	(United Kingdom) Anthony Davidson (United Kingdom) Darren Turner (Netherlands) Jos Verstappen	008	LMP1	342	13th	11th
2009	(United Kingdom) Aston Martin Racing	(United Kingdom) Stuart Hall (Switzerland) Harold Primat (Netherlands) Peter Kox	009	LMP1	252	DNF	DNF
2010	(United Kingdom) Aston Martin Racing	(Switzerland) Harold Primat (Mexico) Adrian Fernandez (Germany) Stefan Mucke	007	LMP1	365	6th	5th
2010	(France) Signature-Plus	(France) Pierre Ragues (France) Franck Mailleux (Belgium) Vanina Ickx	008	LMP1	302	DNF	DNF
2010	(United Kingdom) Aston Martin Racing	(United Kingdom) Darren Turner (Denmark) Juan Barazi (United Kingdom) Sam Hancock	009	LMP1	368	DNF	DNF
2011	(Belgium) Kronos Racing (Belgium) Marc VDS Racing Team	(Belgium) Vanina Ickx (Belgium) Bas Leinders (Belgium) Maxime Martin	22	LMP1	328	7th	7th

== Gallery ==
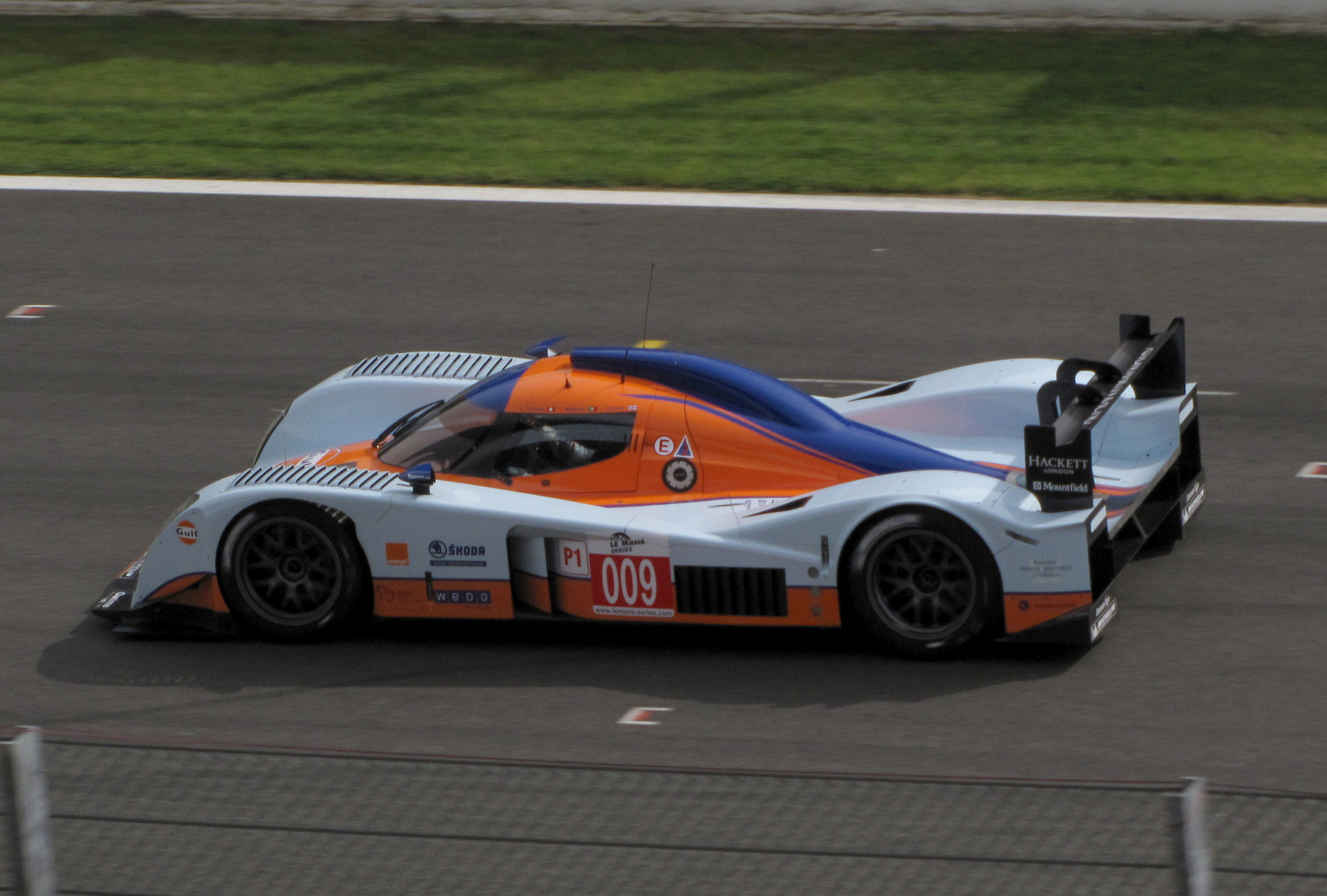
Left side

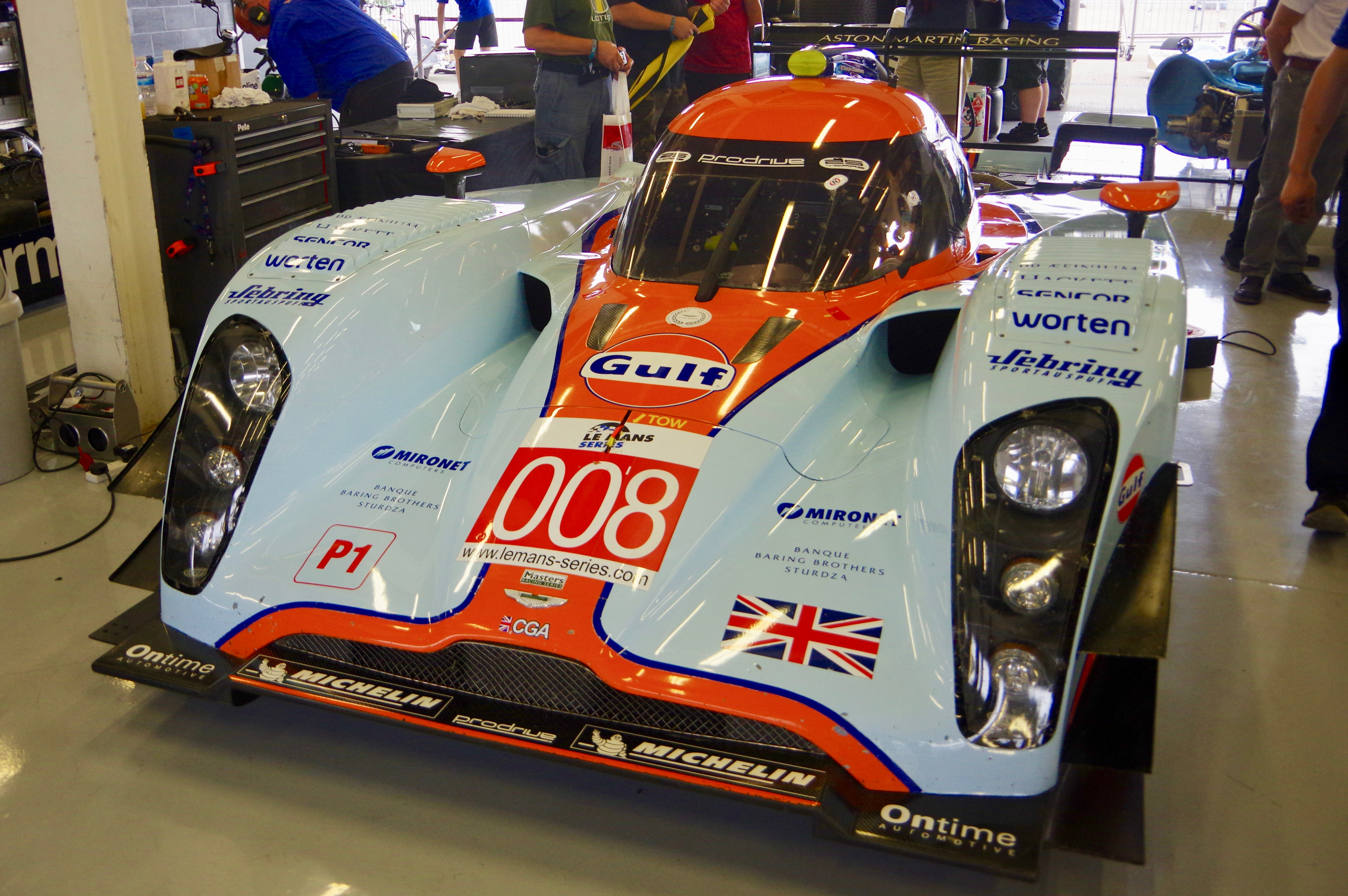
Front close up

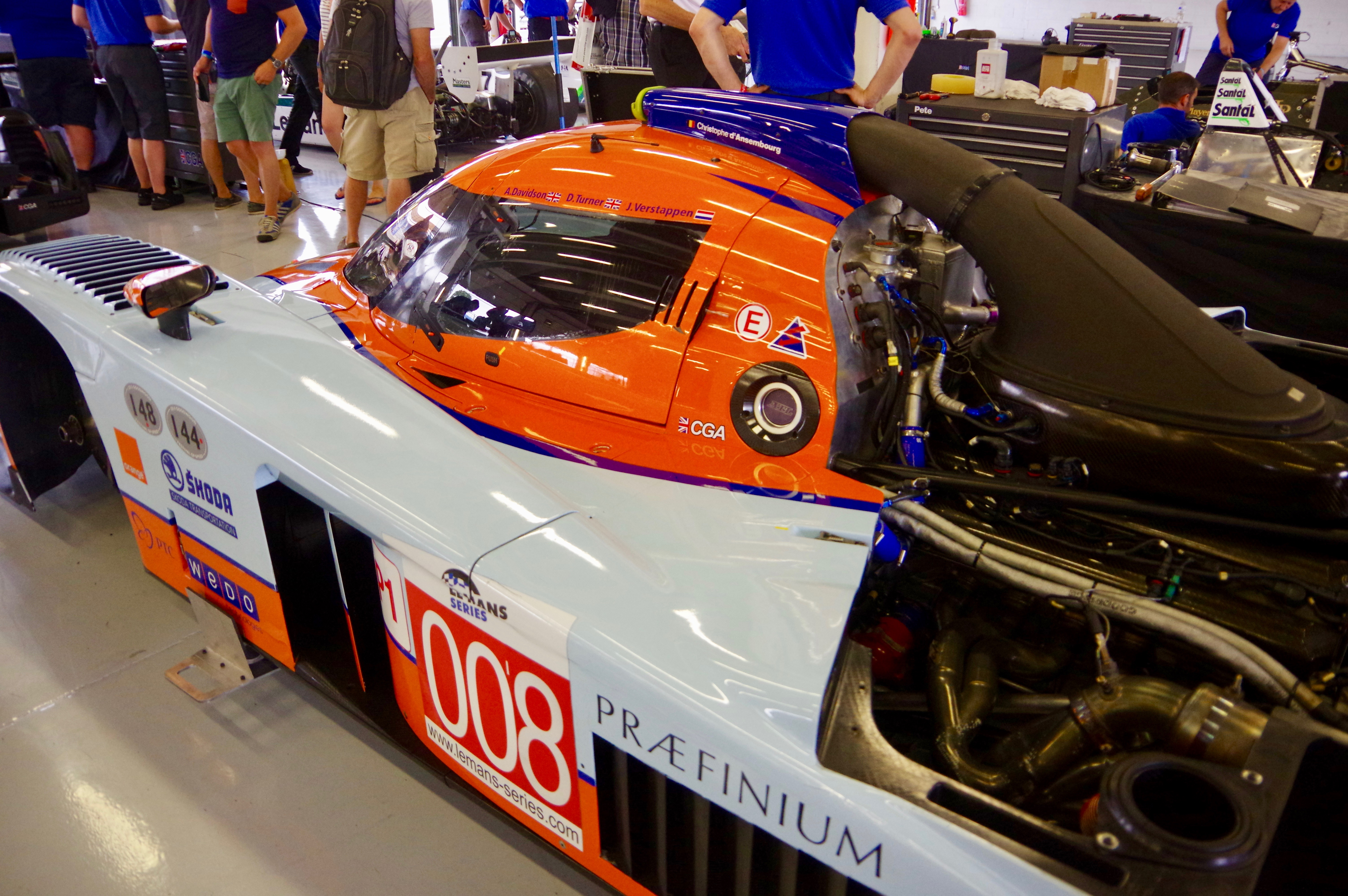
Left side with engine cover off

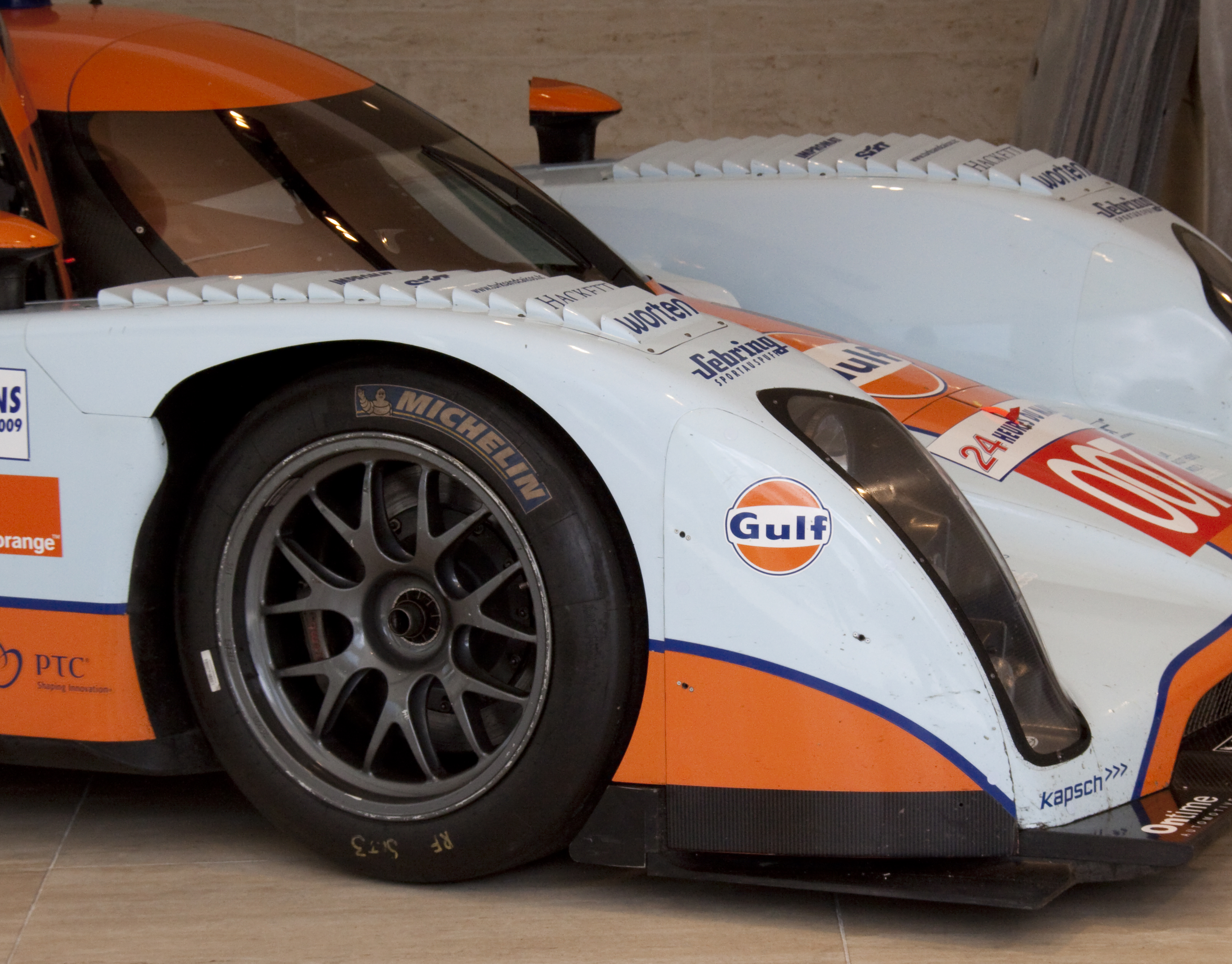
Front right side detail

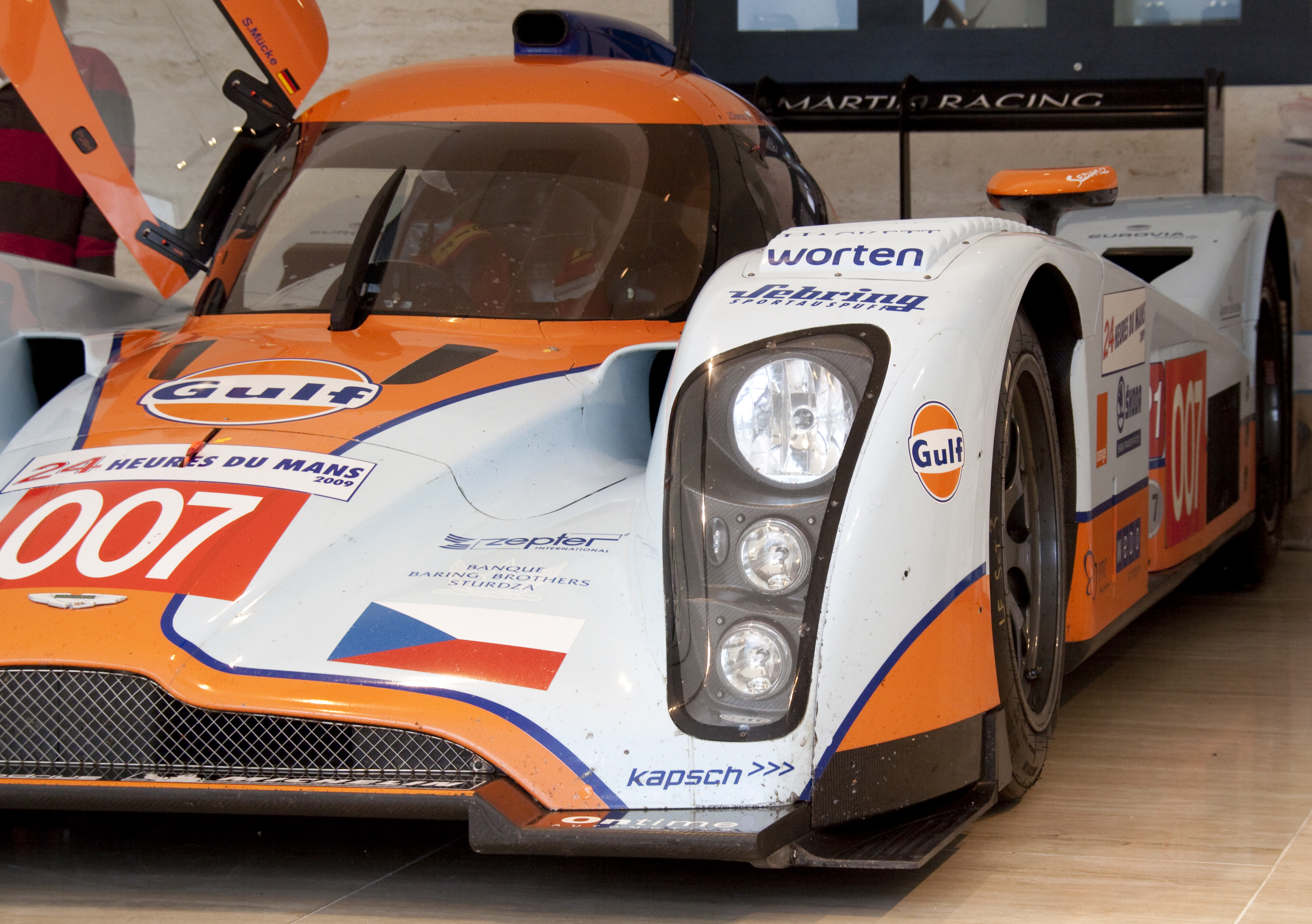
Front detail
