= 2011 Northeast Grand Prix =

Track map of Lime Rock Park

The 2011 American Le Mans Northeast Grand Prix was held at Lime Rock Park on July 9, 2011. It was the third round of the 2011 American Le Mans Series season.

== Qualifying ==
=== Qualifying result ===
Pole position winners in each class are marked in bold.

Pos	Class	Team	Driver	Lap Time	Grid
1	**LMP1**	**#16 Dyson Racing Team**	**Chris Dyson**	**0:45.708**	**1**
2	LMP1	#20 Oryx Dyson Racing	Steven Kane	0:45.881	2
3	LMP1	#6 Muscle Milk Aston Martin Racing	Klaus Graf	0:46.040	3
4	**LMPC**	**#63 Genoa Racing**	**Elton Julian**	**0:48.105**	**4**
5	LMPC	#06 CORE Autosport	Gunnar Jeannette	0:48.498	5
6	LMPC	#89 Intersport Racing	Kyle Marcelli	0:48.534	6
7	LMPC	#05 CORE Autosport	Jon Bennett	0:49.413	7
8	LMPC	#37 Intersport Racing	Jon Field	0:49.466	8
9	LMPC	#18 Performance Tech Motorsports	Anthony Nicolosi	0:49.833	9
10	**GT**	**#56 BMW Team RLL**	**Joey Hand**	**0:50.925**	**10**
11	GT	#55 BMW Team RLL	Dirk Werner	0:51.179	11
12	GT	#45 Flying Lizard Motorsports	Patrick Long	0:51.872	12
13	GT	#4 Corvette Racing	Oliver Gavin	0:51.897	13
14	GT	#3 Corvette Racing	Tommy Milner	0:51.954	14
15	GT	#44 Flying Lizard Motorsports	Marco Holzer	0:52.005	15
16	GT	#04 Robertson Racing	Anthony Lazzaro	0:52.109	16
17	GT	#02 Extreme Speed Motorsports	Guy Cosmo	0:52.350	17
18	GT	#17 Team Falken Tire	Bryan Sellers	0:52.388	18
19	GT	#01 Extreme Speed Motorsports	Scott Sharp	0:52.956	19
20	GT	#99 JaguarRSR	Bruno Junqueira	0:52.958	20
21	GT	#48 Paul Miller Racing	Bryce Miller	0:53.211	21
22	**GTC**	**#34 Green Hornet**	**Jaap van Lagen**	**0:54.982**	**22**
23	GTC	#54 Black Swan Racing	Damien Faulkner	0:55.133	23
24	GTC	#11 JDX Racing	Nick Ham	0:55.225	24
25	GTC	#68 TRG	Dion von Moltke	0:55.334	25
26	GTC	#66 TRG	Spencer Pumpelly	0:55.587	26
27	GTC	#23 Alex Job Racing	Butch Leitzinger	0:55.587	27
28	GT	#40 Robertson Racing	Andrea Robertson	0:55.676	28
29	GTC	#32 GMG Racing	James Sofronas	0:55.874	29
30	GT	#98 JaguarRSR	P. J. Jones	0:56.960	30
31	GT	#62 Risi Competizione	No Time		31

== Race ==
=== Race result ===
Class winners in bold. Cars failing to complete 70% of their class winner's distance are marked as Not Classified (NC).

Pos	Class	No	Team	Drivers	Chassis	Tire	Laps
Pos	Class	No	Team	Drivers	Engine	Tire	Laps
1	**LMP1**	**16**	**(United States) Dyson Racing Team**	**(United States) Chris Dyson (United Kingdom) Guy Smith**	**Lola B09/86**	D	**187**
1	**LMP1**	**16**	**(United States) Dyson Racing Team**	**(United States) Chris Dyson (United Kingdom) Guy Smith**	**Mazda MZR-R 2.0 L Turbo I4 (Isobutanol)**	D	**187**
2	LMP1	6	(United States) Muscle Milk Aston Martin Racing	(Germany) Klaus Graf (Germany) Lucas Luhr	Lola-Aston Martin B08/62	M	187
2	LMP1	6	(United States) Muscle Milk Aston Martin Racing	(Germany) Klaus Graf (Germany) Lucas Luhr	Aston Martin 6.0 L V12	M	187
3	LMP1	20	(United States) Oryx Dyson Racing	(United Arab Emirates) Humaid Al Masaood (United Kingdom) Steven Kane	Lola B09/86	D	182
3	LMP1	20	(United States) Oryx Dyson Racing	(United Arab Emirates) Humaid Al Masaood (United Kingdom) Steven Kane	Mazda MZR-R 2.0 L Turbo I4 (Isobutanol)	D	182
4	**LMPC**	**63**	**(United States) Genoa Racing**	**(United States) Eric Lux (United States) Elton Julian**	**Oreca FLM09**	M	**181**
4	**LMPC**	**63**	**(United States) Genoa Racing**	**(United States) Eric Lux (United States) Elton Julian**	**Chevrolet LS3 6.2 L V8**	M	**181**
5	LMPC	06	(United States) CORE Autosport	(United States) Gunnar Jeannette (Mexico) Ricardo González	Oreca FLM09	M	181
5	LMPC	06	(United States) CORE Autosport	(United States) Gunnar Jeannette (Mexico) Ricardo González	Chevrolet LS3 6.2 L V8	M	181
6	LMPC	89	(United States) Intersport Racing	(Canada) Kyle Marcelli (United States) Tomy Drissi	Oreca FLM09	M	180
6	LMPC	89	(United States) Intersport Racing	(Canada) Kyle Marcelli (United States) Tomy Drissi	Chevrolet LS3 6.2 L V8	M	180
7	**GT**	**56**	**(United States) BMW Team RLL**	**(Germany) Dirk Müller (United States) Joey Hand**	**BMW M3 GT2**	D	**176**
7	**GT**	**56**	**(United States) BMW Team RLL**	**(Germany) Dirk Müller (United States) Joey Hand**	**BMW 4.0 L V8**	D	**176**
8	GT	45	(United States) Flying Lizard Motorsports	(Germany) Jörg Bergmeister (United States) Patrick Long	Porsche 997 GT3-RSR	M	176
8	GT	45	(United States) Flying Lizard Motorsports	(Germany) Jörg Bergmeister (United States) Patrick Long	Porsche 4.0 L Flat-6	M	176
9	LMPC	18	(United States) Performance Tech Motorsports	(United States) Anthony Nicolosi (United States) Jarrett Boon	Oreca FLM09	M	175
9	LMPC	18	(United States) Performance Tech Motorsports	(United States) Anthony Nicolosi (United States) Jarrett Boon	Chevrolet LS3 6.2 L V8	M	175
10	LMPC	05	(United States) CORE Autosport	(United States) Jon Bennett (United States) Frankie Montecalvo	Oreca FLM09	M	175
10	LMPC	05	(United States) CORE Autosport	(United States) Jon Bennett (United States) Frankie Montecalvo	Chevrolet LS3 6.2 L V8	M	175
11	GT	04	(United States) Robertson Racing	(United States) David Murry (United States) Anthony Lazzaro	Ford GT-R Mk.VII	M	174
11	GT	04	(United States) Robertson Racing	(United States) David Murry (United States) Anthony Lazzaro	Ford (Élan) 5.0 L V8	M	174
12	GT	01	(United States) Extreme Speed Motorsports	(United States) Scott Sharp (United States) Johannes van Overbeek	Ferrari 458 Italia GT2	M	174
12	GT	01	(United States) Extreme Speed Motorsports	(United States) Scott Sharp (United States) Johannes van Overbeek	Ferrari 4.5 L V8	M	174
13	GT	17	(United States) Team Falken Tire	(Germany) Wolf Henzler (United States) Bryan Sellers	Porsche 997 GT3-RSR	F	174
13	GT	17	(United States) Team Falken Tire	(Germany) Wolf Henzler (United States) Bryan Sellers	Porsche 4.0 L Flat-6	F	174
14	GT	48	(United States) Paul Miller Racing	(United States) Bryce Miller (Germany) Sascha Maassen	Porsche 997 GT3-RSR	Y	172
14	GT	48	(United States) Paul Miller Racing	(United States) Bryce Miller (Germany) Sascha Maassen	Porsche 4.0 L Flat-6	Y	172
15	GT	44	(United States) Flying Lizard Motorsports	(United States) Seth Neiman (Germany) Marco Holzer	Porsche 997 GT3-RSR	M	165
15	GT	44	(United States) Flying Lizard Motorsports	(United States) Seth Neiman (Germany) Marco Holzer	Porsche 4.0 L Flat-6	M	165
16	**GTC**	**68**	**(United States) TRG**	**(South Africa) Dion von Moltke (United States) Mike Piera**	**Porsche 997 GT3 Cup**	Y	**164**
16	**GTC**	**68**	**(United States) TRG**	**(South Africa) Dion von Moltke (United States) Mike Piera**	**Porsche 4.0 L Flat-6**	Y	**164**
17	GTC	66	(United States) TRG	(United States) Duncan Ende (United States) Spencer Pumpelly	Porsche 997 GT3 Cup	Y	164
17	GTC	66	(United States) TRG	(United States) Duncan Ende (United States) Spencer Pumpelly	Porsche 4.0 L Flat-6	Y	164
18	GTC	23	(United States) Alex Job Racing	(United States) Bill Sweedler (United States) Butch Leitzinger	Porsche 997 GT3 Cup	Y	164
18	GTC	23	(United States) Alex Job Racing	(United States) Bill Sweedler (United States) Butch Leitzinger	Porsche 4.0 L Flat-6	Y	164
19	GTC	54	(United States) Black Swan Racing	(United States) Tim Pappas (Republic of Ireland) Damien Faulkner	Porsche 997 GT3 Cup	Y	164
19	GTC	54	(United States) Black Swan Racing	(United States) Tim Pappas (Republic of Ireland) Damien Faulkner	Porsche 4.0 L Flat-6	Y	164
20	GT	55	(United States) BMW Team RLL	(United States) Bill Auberlen (Germany) Dirk Werner	BMW M3 GT2	D	163
20	GT	55	(United States) BMW Team RLL	(United States) Bill Auberlen (Germany) Dirk Werner	BMW 4.0 L V8	D	163
21	GT	3	(United States) Corvette Racing	(Monaco) Olivier Beretta (United States) Tommy Milner	Chevrolet Corvette C6.R	M	161
21	GT	3	(United States) Corvette Racing	(Monaco) Olivier Beretta (United States) Tommy Milner	Chevrolet 5.5 L V8	M	161
22	GTC	32	(United States) GMG Racing	(United States) James Sofronas (United States) Alex Welch	Porsche 997 GT3 Cup	Y	160
22	GTC	32	(United States) GMG Racing	(United States) James Sofronas (United States) Alex Welch	Porsche 4.0 L Flat-6	Y	160
23	GT	4	(United States) Corvette Racing	(United Kingdom) Oliver Gavin (Denmark) Jan Magnussen	Chevrolet Corvette C6.R	M	156
23	GT	4	(United States) Corvette Racing	(United Kingdom) Oliver Gavin (Denmark) Jan Magnussen	Chevrolet 5.5 L V8	M	156
24	GT	02	(United States) Extreme Speed Motorsports	(United States) Ed Brown (United States) Guy Cosmo	Ferrari 458 Italia GT2	M	153
24	GT	02	(United States) Extreme Speed Motorsports	(United States) Ed Brown (United States) Guy Cosmo	Ferrari 4.5 L V8	M	153
25 DNF	GTC	11	(United States) JDX Racing	(United States) Nick Ham (United States) Chris Thompson	Porsche 997 GT3 Cup	Y	149
25 DNF	GTC	11	(United States) JDX Racing	(United States) Nick Ham (United States) Chris Thompson	Porsche 4.0 L Flat-6	Y	149
26 DNF	GT	99	(United States) JaguarRSR	(Brazil) Bruno Junqueira (Brazil) Cristiano da Matta	Jaguar XKR GT	D	149
26 DNF	GT	99	(United States) JaguarRSR	(Brazil) Bruno Junqueira (Brazil) Cristiano da Matta	Jaguar 5.0 L V8	D	149
27 DNF	LMPC	37	(United States) Intersport Racing	(United States) Jon Field (Australia) James Kovacic	Oreca FLM09	M	126
27 DNF	LMPC	37	(United States) Intersport Racing	(United States) Jon Field (Australia) James Kovacic	Chevrolet LS3 6.2 L V8	M	126
28 DNF	GT	40	(United States) Robertson Racing	(United States) David Robertson (United States) Andrea Robertson	Ford GT-R Mk.VII	M	116
28 DNF	GT	40	(United States) Robertson Racing	(United States) David Robertson (United States) Andrea Robertson	Ford (Élan) 5.0 L V8	M	116
29 DNF	GT	62	(United States) Risi Competizione	(Brazil) Jaime Melo (Finland) Toni Vilander	Ferrari 458 Italia GT2	M	79
29 DNF	GT	62	(United States) Risi Competizione	(Brazil) Jaime Melo (Finland) Toni Vilander	Ferrari 4.5 L V8	M	79
30 NC	GTC	34	(United States) Green Hornet	(United States) Peter LeSaffre (Netherlands) Jaap van Lagen	Porsche 997 GT3 Cup	Y	74
30 NC	GTC	34	(United States) Green Hornet	(United States) Peter LeSaffre (Netherlands) Jaap van Lagen	Porsche 4.0 L Flat-6	Y	74
31 DNF	GT	98	(United States) JaguarRSR	(United States) P. J. Jones (United States) Rocky Moran Jr.	Jaguar XKR GT	D	49
31 DNF	GT	98	(United States) JaguarRSR	(United States) P. J. Jones (United States) Rocky Moran Jr.	Jaguar 5.0 L V8	D	49

American Le Mans Series
Previous race: ALMS at Long Beach	2011 season	Next race: Grand Prix of Mosport
