= 2011 Road Race Showcase =

Track map of Road America.

The 2011 Time Warner Cable Road Race Showcase was held at Road America on August 20, 2011. It was the sixth round of the 2011 American Le Mans Series season.

== Qualifying ==
=== Qualifying result ===
Pole position winners in each class are marked in bold.

Pos	Class	Team	Driver	Lap Time	Grid
1	**LMP1**	**#6 Muscle Milk Aston Martin Racing**	**Klaus Graf**	**1:51.828**	**1**
2	LMP1	#20 Oryx Dyson Racing	Steven Kane	1:52.192	2
3	LMP1	#16 Dyson Racing Team	Chris Dyson	1:52.401	3
4	LMP1	#12 Autocon	Tony Burgess	1:56.344	4
5	**LMP2**	**#055 Level 5 Motorsports**	**Christophe Bouchut**	**1:56.664**	**5**
6	**LMPC**	**#52 PR1 Mathiasen Motorsports**	**Butch Leitzinger**	**1:59.262**	**6**
7	LMPC	#06 CORE Autosport	Gunnar Jeannette	1:59.357	7
8	LMPC	#18 Performance Tech Motorpsorts	Kyle Marcelli	1:59.379	8
9	LMPC	#63 Genoa Racing	Eric Lux	1:59.400	9
10	LMPC	#37 Intersport Racing	Jon Field	2:00.106	10
11	LMPC	#05 CORE Autosport	Jon Bennett	2:02.592	11
12	LMPC	#89 Intersport Racing	Clint Field	2:03.727	12
13	**GT**	**#56 BMW Team RLL**	**Dirk Müller**	**2:05.447**	**13**
14	GT	#4 Corvette Racing	Jan Magnussen	2:05.452	14
15	GT	#62 Risi Competizione	Toni Vilander	2:05.687	15
16	GT	#55 BMW Team RLL	Bill Auberlen	2:06.245	16
17	GT	#45 Flying Lizard Motorsports	Jörg Bergmeister	2:06.379	17
18	GT	#3 Corvette Racing	Olivier Beretta	2:06.585	18
19	GT	#01 Extreme Speed Motorsports	Johannes van Overbeek	2:06.730	19
20	GT	#99 JaguarRSR	Bruno Junqueira	2:06.812	20
21	GT	#44 Flying Lizard Motorsports	Marco Holzer	2:06.838	21
22	GT	#17 Team Falken Tire	Wolf Henzler	2:06.921	22
23	GT	#02 Extreme Speed Motorsports	Guy Cosmo	2:06.936	23
24	GT	#04 Robertson Racing	David Murry	2:07.861	24
25	GT	#48 Paul Miller Racing	Bryce Miller	2:10.098	25
26	GT	#40 Robertson Racing	Melanie Snow	2:11.806	26
27	GTC	#30 NGT Motorsport	Sean Edwards	2:14.067	35
28	**GTC**	**#54 Black Swan Racing**	**Jeroen Bleekemolen**	**2:14.126**	**27**
29	GTC	#66 TRG	Spencer Pumpelly	2:14.220	28
30	GTC	#34 Green Hornet/Black Swan Racing	Jaap van Lagen	2:14.900	29
31	GTC	#11 JDX Racing	Nick Ham	2:15.239	30
32	GTC	#23 Alex Job Racing	Brian Wong	2:15.290	31
33	GTC	#68 TRG	Dion von Moltke	2:15.499	32
34	GTC	#32 GMG Racing	James Sofronas	2:15.634	33
35	GTC	#97 Porsche Napleton Racing	Dominik Farnbacher	2:15.826	34
36	GTC	#98 JaguarRSR	No Time		36

== Race ==
=== Race result ===
Class winners in bold. Cars failing to complete 70% of their class winner's distance are marked as Not Classified (NC).

Pos	Class	No	Team	Drivers	Chassis	Tire	Laps
Pos	Class	No	Team	Drivers	Engine	Tire	Laps
1	**LMP1**	**6**	**(United States) Muscle Milk Aston Martin Racing**	**(Germany) Lucas Luhr (Germany) Klaus Graf**	**Lola-Aston Martin B08/62**	MI	**107**
1	**LMP1**	**6**	**(United States) Muscle Milk Aston Martin Racing**	**(Germany) Lucas Luhr (Germany) Klaus Graf**	**Aston Martin 6.0 L V12**	MI	**107**
2	LMP1	16	(United States) Dyson Racing Team	(United States) Chris Dyson (United Kingdom) Guy Smith	Lola B09/86	D	107
2	LMP1	16	(United States) Dyson Racing Team	(United States) Chris Dyson (United Kingdom) Guy Smith	Mazda MZR-R 2.0 L Turbo I4 (Isobutanol)	D	107
3	**LMPC**	**52**	**(United States) PR1 Mathiasen Motorsports**	**(Mexico) Rudy Junco (United States) Butch Leitzinger**	**Oreca FLM09**	MI	**104**
3	**LMPC**	**52**	**(United States) PR1 Mathiasen Motorsports**	**(Mexico) Rudy Junco (United States) Butch Leitzinger**	**Chevrolet LS3 6.2 L V8**	MI	**104**
4	LMPC	63	(United States) Genoa Racing	(United States) Eric Lux (United States) Christian Zugel (United States) Elton Julian	Oreca FLM09	MI	104
4	LMPC	63	(United States) Genoa Racing	(United States) Eric Lux (United States) Christian Zugel (United States) Elton Julian	Chevrolet LS3 6.2 L V8	MI	104
5	**LMP2**	**055**	**(United States) Level 5 Motorsports**	**(United States) Scott Tucker (France) Christophe Bouchut (Mexico) Luis Díaz**	**Lola B11/40**	MI	**103**
5	**LMP2**	**055**	**(United States) Level 5 Motorsports**	**(United States) Scott Tucker (France) Christophe Bouchut (Mexico) Luis Díaz**	**HPD HR28TT 2.8 L Turbo V6**	MI	**103**
6	LMPC	05	(United States) CORE Autosport	(United States) Jon Bennett (United States) Frankie Montecalvo	Oreca FLM09	MI	103
6	LMPC	05	(United States) CORE Autosport	(United States) Jon Bennett (United States) Frankie Montecalvo	Chevrolet LS3 6.2 L V8	MI	103
7	LMP1	12	(United States) Autocon	(Canada) Tony Burgess (United States) Chris McMurry	Lola B06/10	D	103
7	LMP1	12	(United States) Autocon	(Canada) Tony Burgess (United States) Chris McMurry	AER P32C 4.0 L Turbo V8 (Isobutanol)	D	103
8	LMPC	89	(United States) Intersport Racing	(United States) Clint Field (United States) Chapman Ducote (United States) David Ducote	Oreca FLM09	MI	102
8	LMPC	89	(United States) Intersport Racing	(United States) Clint Field (United States) Chapman Ducote (United States) David Ducote	Chevrolet LS3 6.2 L V8	MI	102
9	LMPC	06	(United States) CORE Autosport	(United States) Gunnar Jeannette (Mexico) Ricardo González	Oreca FLM09	MI	102
9	LMPC	06	(United States) CORE Autosport	(United States) Gunnar Jeannette (Mexico) Ricardo González	Chevrolet LS3 6.2 L V8	MI	102
10	**GT**	**62**	**(United States) Risi Competizione**	**(Brazil) Jaime Melo (Finland) Toni Vilander**	**Ferrari 458 Italia GT2**	MI	**101**
10	**GT**	**62**	**(United States) Risi Competizione**	**(Brazil) Jaime Melo (Finland) Toni Vilander**	**Ferrari 4.5 L V8**	MI	**101**
11	GT	55	(United States) BMW Team RLL	(United States) Bill Auberlen (Germany) Dirk Werner	BMW M3 GT2	D	101
11	GT	55	(United States) BMW Team RLL	(United States) Bill Auberlen (Germany) Dirk Werner	BMW 4.0 L V8	D	101
12	GT	56	(United States) BMW Team RLL	(Germany) Dirk Müller (United States) Joey Hand	BMW M3 GT2	D	101
12	GT	56	(United States) BMW Team RLL	(Germany) Dirk Müller (United States) Joey Hand	BMW 4.0 L V8	D	101
13	GT	45	(United States) Flying Lizard Motorsports	(Germany) Jörg Bergmeister (United States) Patrick Long	Porsche 997 GT3-RSR	MI	101
13	GT	45	(United States) Flying Lizard Motorsports	(Germany) Jörg Bergmeister (United States) Patrick Long	Porsche 4.0 L Flat-6	MI	101
14	GT	4	(United States) Corvette Racing	(United Kingdom) Oliver Gavin (Denmark) Jan Magnussen	Chevrolet Corvette C6.R	MI	101
14	GT	4	(United States) Corvette Racing	(United Kingdom) Oliver Gavin (Denmark) Jan Magnussen	Chevrolet 5.5 L V8	MI	101
15	GT	17	(United States) Team Falken Tire	(Germany) Wolf Henzler (United States) Bryan Sellers	Porsche 997 GT3-RSR	FAL	101
15	GT	17	(United States) Team Falken Tire	(Germany) Wolf Henzler (United States) Bryan Sellers	Porsche 4.0 L Flat-6	FAL	101
16	LMPC	18	(United States) Performance Tech Motorsports	(United States) Anthony Nicolosi (United States) Jarrett Boon (Canada) Kyle Marcelli	Oreca FLM09	MI	101
16	LMPC	18	(United States) Performance Tech Motorsports	(United States) Anthony Nicolosi (United States) Jarrett Boon (Canada) Kyle Marcelli	Chevrolet LS3 6.2 L V8	MI	101
17	GT	48	(United States) Paul Miller Racing	(United States) Bryce Miller (Germany) Sascha Maassen	Porsche 997 GT3-RSR	Y	101
17	GT	48	(United States) Paul Miller Racing	(United States) Bryce Miller (Germany) Sascha Maassen	Porsche 4.0 L Flat-6	Y	101
18	GT	01	(United States) Extreme Speed Motorsports	(United States) Scott Sharp (United States) Johannes van Overbeek	Ferrari 458 Italia GT2	MI	101
18	GT	01	(United States) Extreme Speed Motorsports	(United States) Scott Sharp (United States) Johannes van Overbeek	Ferrari 4.5 L V8	MI	101
19	GT	44	(United States) Flying Lizard Motorsports	(United States) Seth Neiman (Germany) Marco Holzer	Porsche 997 GT3-RSR	MI	100
19	GT	44	(United States) Flying Lizard Motorsports	(United States) Seth Neiman (Germany) Marco Holzer	Porsche 4.0 L Flat-6	MI	100
20	GT	04	(United States) Robertson Racing	(United States) David Murry (United States) Anthony Lazzaro	Ford GT-R Mk.VII	MI	100
20	GT	04	(United States) Robertson Racing	(United States) David Murry (United States) Anthony Lazzaro	Élan 5.0 L V8	MI	100
21	GT	02	(United States) Extreme Speed Motorsports	(United States) Ed Brown (United States) Guy Cosmo	Ferrari 458 Italia GT2	MI	100
21	GT	02	(United States) Extreme Speed Motorsports	(United States) Ed Brown (United States) Guy Cosmo	Ferrari 4.5 L V8	MI	100
22	GT	40	(United States) Robertson Racing	(United States) Andrea Robertson (United States) Melanie Snow	Ford GT-R Mk.VII	MI	97
22	GT	40	(United States) Robertson Racing	(United States) Andrea Robertson (United States) Melanie Snow	Élan 5.0 L V8	MI	97
23	**GTC**	**54**	**(United States) Black Swan Racing**	**(United States) Tim Pappas (Netherlands) Jeroen Bleekemolen**	**Porsche 997 GT3 Cup**	Y	**96**
23	**GTC**	**54**	**(United States) Black Swan Racing**	**(United States) Tim Pappas (Netherlands) Jeroen Bleekemolen**	**Porsche 4.0 L Flat-6**	Y	**96**
24	GTC	66	(United States) TRG	(United States) Duncan Ende (United States) Spencer Pumpelly	Porsche 997 GT3 Cup	Y	96
24	GTC	66	(United States) TRG	(United States) Duncan Ende (United States) Spencer Pumpelly	Porsche 4.0 L Flat-6	Y	96
25	GTC	30	(United States) NGT Motorsport	(United Kingdom) Sean Edwards (United States) Carlos Kaufmann (United States) Henrique Cisneros	Porsche 997 GT3 Cup	Y	96
25	GTC	30	(United States) NGT Motorsport	(United Kingdom) Sean Edwards (United States) Carlos Kaufmann (United States) Henrique Cisneros	Porsche 4.0 L Flat-6	Y	96
26	GTC	32	(United States) GMG Racing	(United States) James Sofronas (United States) Alex Welch	Porsche 997 GT3 Cup	Y	95
26	GTC	32	(United States) GMG Racing	(United States) James Sofronas (United States) Alex Welch	Porsche 4.0 L Flat-6	Y	95
27	GTC	34	(United States) Green Hornet (United States) Black Swan Racing	(United States) Peter LeSaffre (Netherlands) Jaap van Lagen	Porsche 997 GT3 Cup	Y	93
27	GTC	34	(United States) Green Hornet (United States) Black Swan Racing	(United States) Peter LeSaffre (Netherlands) Jaap van Lagen	Porsche 4.0 L Flat-6	Y	93
28	GTC	68	(United States) TRG	(South Africa) Dion von Moltke (Venezuela) Emilio Di Guida	Porsche 997 GT3 Cup	Y	92
28	GTC	68	(United States) TRG	(South Africa) Dion von Moltke (Venezuela) Emilio Di Guida	Porsche 4.0 L Flat-6	Y	92
29	GTC	97	(United States) Porsche Napleton Racing	(Denmark) David Heinemeier Hansson (Germany) Dominik Farnbacher	Porsche 997 GT3 Cup	Y	91
29	GTC	97	(United States) Porsche Napleton Racing	(Denmark) David Heinemeier Hansson (Germany) Dominik Farnbacher	Porsche 4.0 L Flat-6	Y	91
30	GT	98	(United States) JaguarRSR	(United States) P. J. Jones (United States) Rocky Moran, Jr.	Jaguar XKR GT	D	83
30	GT	98	(United States) JaguarRSR	(United States) P. J. Jones (United States) Rocky Moran, Jr.	Jaguar 5.0 L V8	D	83
31 DNF	LMPC	37	(United States) Intersport Racing	(United States) Jon Field (United States) James French (United States) Michael Marsal	Oreca FLM09	MI	89
31 DNF	LMPC	37	(United States) Intersport Racing	(United States) Jon Field (United States) James French (United States) Michael Marsal	Chevrolet LS3 6.2 L V8	MI	89
32 DNF	GT	3	(United States) Corvette Racing	(Monaco) Olivier Beretta (United States) Tommy Milner	Chevrolet Corvette C6.R	MI	77
32 DNF	GT	3	(United States) Corvette Racing	(Monaco) Olivier Beretta (United States) Tommy Milner	Chevrolet 5.5 L V8	MI	77
33 DNF	LMP1	20	(United States) Oryx Dyson Racing	(United Arab Emirates) Humaid Al Masaood (United Kingdom) Steven Kane	Lola B09/86	D	62
33 DNF	LMP1	20	(United States) Oryx Dyson Racing	(United Arab Emirates) Humaid Al Masaood (United Kingdom) Steven Kane	Mazda MZR-R 2.0 L Turbo I4 (Isobutanol)	D	62
34 DNF	GTC	11	(United States) JDX Racing	(United States) Nick Ham (United States) Chris Thompson	Porsche 997 GT3 Cup	Y	60
34 DNF	GTC	11	(United States) JDX Racing	(United States) Nick Ham (United States) Chris Thompson	Porsche 4.0 L Flat-6	Y	60
35 DNF	GT	99	(United States) JaguarRSR	(Brazil) Bruno Junqueira (Canada) Kenny Wilden	Jaguar XKR GT	D	9
35 DNF	GT	99	(United States) JaguarRSR	(Brazil) Bruno Junqueira (Canada) Kenny Wilden	Jaguar 5.0 L V8	D	9
36 DNF	GTC	23	(United States) Alex Job Racing	(United States) Bill Sweedler (United States) Brian Wong	Porsche 997 GT3 Cup	Y	2
36 DNF	GTC	23	(United States) Alex Job Racing	(United States) Bill Sweedler (United States) Brian Wong	Porsche 4.0 L Flat-6	Y	2

American Le Mans Series
Previous race: Mid-Ohio Sports Car Challenge	2011 season	Next race: Baltimore Grand Prix
