= 2011 Mid-Ohio Sports Car Challenge =

The layout of Mid-Ohio Sports Car Course

The 2011 Mid-Ohio Sports Car Challenge was held at Mid-Ohio Sports Car Course on August 5, 2011. It was the fifth round of the 2011 American Le Mans Series season.

== Qualifying ==
=== Qualifying result ===
Pole position winners in each class are marked in bold.

Pos	Class	Team	Driver	Lap Time	Grid
1	**LMP1**	**#16 Dyson Racing Team**	**Guy Smith**	**1:12.727**	**1**
2	LMP1	#6 Muscle Milk Aston Martin Racing	Klaus Graf	1:12.892	2
3	LMP1	#20 Oryx Dyson Racing	Steven Kane	1:13.607	3
4	LMP1	#12 Autocon	Chris McMurry	1:17.035	4
5	**LMPC**	**#06 CORE Autosport**	**Gunnar Jeannette**	**1:17.281**	**5**
6	LMPC	#89 Intersport Racing	Kyle Marcelli	1:17.332	6
7	LMPC	#37 Intersport Racing	Jon Field	1:17.670	7
8	LMPC	#63 Genoa Racing	Eric Lux	1:17.972	8
9	LMPC	#52 PR1 Mathiasen Motorsports	Javier Echeverria	1:18.540	9
10	LMPC	#05 CORE Autosport	Frankie Montecalvo	1:18.684	10
11	LMPC	#18 Performance Tech Motorsports	Anthony Nicolosi	1:19.032	11
12	**GT**	**#56 BMW Team RLL**	**Joey Hand**	**1:20.539**	**12**
13	GT	#55 BMW Team RLL	Dirk Werner	1:20.655	13
14	GT	#62 Risi Competizione	Jaime Melo	1:20.745	14
15	GT	#45 Flying Lizard Motorsports	Jörg Bergmeister	1:20.917	15
16	GT	#4 Corvette Racing	Oliver Gavin	1:20.944	16
17	GT	#02 Extreme Speed Motorsports	Guy Cosmo	1:21.068	17
18	GT	#01 Extreme Speed Motorsports	Johannes van Overbeek	1:21.256	18
19	GT	#3 Corvette Racing	Tommy Milner	1:21.280	19
20	GT	#17 Team Falken Tire	Bryan Sellers	1:21.921	20
21	GT	#04 Robertson Racing	Anthony Lazzaro	1:22.128	21
22	GT	#99 JaguarRSR	Bruno Junqueira	1:22.569	22
23	GT	#98 JaguarRSR	P. J. Jones	1:22.971	23
24	GT	#48 Paul Miller Racing	Sascha Maassen	1:23.084	24
25	GT	#40 Robertson Racing	Melanie Snow	1:23.854	25
26	GT	#44 Flying Lizard Motorsports	Seth Neiman	1:24.712	26
27	**GTC**	**#66 TRG**	**Spencer Pumpelly**	**1:26.602**	**27**
28	GTC	#23 Alex Job Racing	Leh Keen	1:26.614	28
29	GTC	#54 Black Swan Racing	Jeroen Bleekemolen	1:26.741	29
30	GTC	#77 Magnus Racing	Craig Stanton	1:27.336	30
31	GTC	#68 TRG	Dion von Moltke	1:27.429	31
32	GTC	#11 JDX Racing	Nick Ham	1:27.784	32
33	GTC	#34 Green Hornet/Black Swan Racing	Andrew Davis	1:27.791	33

== Race ==
The race was red flagged with around 10 minutes to go due to heavy rain conditions. Team Falken Tire had very good wet weather tires which earned them their first win in ALMS. Driver Wolf Henzler was fifth in class before the rain started falling and made his way up to first place in just one lap.

=== Race result ===
Class winners in bold. Cars failing to complete 70% of their class winner's distance are marked as Not Classified (NC).

Pos	Class	No	Team	Drivers	Chassis	Tire	Laps
Pos	Class	No	Team	Drivers	Engine	Tire	Laps
1	**LMP1**	**6**	**(United States) Muscle Milk Aston Martin Racing**	**(Germany) Lucas Luhr (Germany) Klaus Graf**	**Lola-Aston Martin B08/62**	MI	**96**
1	**LMP1**	**6**	**(United States) Muscle Milk Aston Martin Racing**	**(Germany) Lucas Luhr (Germany) Klaus Graf**	**Aston Martin 6.0 L V12**	MI	**96**
2	LMP1	16	(United States) Dyson Racing Team	(United States) Chris Dyson (United Kingdom) Guy Smith	Lola B09/86	D	96
2	LMP1	16	(United States) Dyson Racing Team	(United States) Chris Dyson (United Kingdom) Guy Smith	Mazda MZR-R 2.0 L Turbo I4 (Isobutanol)	D	96
3	**LMPC**	**89**	**(United States) Intersport Racing**	**(Canada) Kyle Marcelli (United States) Tomy Drissi**	**Oreca FLM09**	MI	**93**
3	**LMPC**	**89**	**(United States) Intersport Racing**	**(Canada) Kyle Marcelli (United States) Tomy Drissi**	**Chevrolet LS3 6.2 L V8**	MI	**93**
4	LMPC	37	(United States) Intersport Racing	(United States) Jon Field (United States) Clint Field	Oreca FLM09	MI	93
4	LMPC	37	(United States) Intersport Racing	(United States) Jon Field (United States) Clint Field	Chevrolet LS3 6.2 L V8	MI	93
5	LMPC	52	(United States) PR1 Mathiasen Motorsports	(United States) David Cheng (Mexico) Javier Echeverría	Oreca FLM09	MI	93
5	LMPC	52	(United States) PR1 Mathiasen Motorsports	(United States) David Cheng (Mexico) Javier Echeverría	Chevrolet LS3 6.2 L V8	MI	93
6	**GT**	**17**	**(United States) Team Falken Tire**	**(Germany) Wolf Henzler (United States) Bryan Sellers**	**Porsche 997 GT3-RSR**	FAL	**92**
6	**GT**	**17**	**(United States) Team Falken Tire**	**(Germany) Wolf Henzler (United States) Bryan Sellers**	**Porsche 4.0 L Flat-6**	FAL	**92**
7	GT	4	(United States) Corvette Racing	(United Kingdom) Oliver Gavin (Denmark) Jan Magnussen	Chevrolet Corvette C6.R	MI	92
7	GT	4	(United States) Corvette Racing	(United Kingdom) Oliver Gavin (Denmark) Jan Magnussen	Chevrolet 5.5 L V8	MI	92
8	GT	55	(United States) BMW Team RLL	(United States) Bill Auberlen (Germany) Dirk Werner	BMW M3 GT2	D	92
8	GT	55	(United States) BMW Team RLL	(United States) Bill Auberlen (Germany) Dirk Werner	BMW 4.0 L V8	D	92
9	GT	56	(United States) BMW Team RLL	(Germany) Dirk Müller (United States) Joey Hand	BMW M3 GT2	D	92
9	GT	56	(United States) BMW Team RLL	(Germany) Dirk Müller (United States) Joey Hand	BMW 4.0 L V8	D	92
10	GT	01	(United States) Extreme Speed Motorsports	(United States) Scott Sharp (United States) Johannes van Overbeek	Ferrari 458 Italia GT2	MI	92
10	GT	01	(United States) Extreme Speed Motorsports	(United States) Scott Sharp (United States) Johannes van Overbeek	Ferrari 4.5 L V8	MI	92
11	GT	3	(United States) Corvette Racing	(Monaco) Olivier Beretta (United States) Tommy Milner	Chevrolet Corvette C6.R	MI	92
11	GT	3	(United States) Corvette Racing	(Monaco) Olivier Beretta (United States) Tommy Milner	Chevrolet 5.5 L V8	MI	92
12	LMPC	06	(United States) CORE Autosport	(United States) Gunnar Jeannette (Mexico) Ricardo González	Oreca FLM09	MI	91
12	LMPC	06	(United States) CORE Autosport	(United States) Gunnar Jeannette (Mexico) Ricardo González	Chevrolet LS3 6.2 L V8	MI	91
13	GT	04	(United States) Robertson Racing	(United States) David Murry (United States) Anthony Lazzaro	Ford GT-R Mk.VII	MI	91
13	GT	04	(United States) Robertson Racing	(United States) David Murry (United States) Anthony Lazzaro	Élan 5.0 L V8	MI	91
14	LMPC	63	(United States) Genoa Racing	(United States) Eric Lux (United States) Christian Zugel	Oreca FLM09	MI	91
14	LMPC	63	(United States) Genoa Racing	(United States) Eric Lux (United States) Christian Zugel	Chevrolet LS3 6.2 L V8	MI	91
15	GT	48	(United States) Paul Miller Racing	(United States) Bryce Miller (Germany) Sascha Maassen	Porsche 997 GT3-RSR	Y	91
15	GT	48	(United States) Paul Miller Racing	(United States) Bryce Miller (Germany) Sascha Maassen	Porsche 4.0 L Flat-6	Y	91
16	GT	45	(United States) Flying Lizard Motorsports	(Germany) Jörg Bergmeister (United States) Patrick Long	Porsche 997 GT3-RSR	MI	91
16	GT	45	(United States) Flying Lizard Motorsports	(Germany) Jörg Bergmeister (United States) Patrick Long	Porsche 4.0 L Flat-6	MI	91
17	LMPC	05	(United States) CORE Autosport	(United States) Jon Bennett (United States) Frankie Montecalvo	Oreca FLM09	MI	90
17	LMPC	05	(United States) CORE Autosport	(United States) Jon Bennett (United States) Frankie Montecalvo	Chevrolet LS3 6.2 L V8	MI	90
18	GT	44	(United States) Flying Lizard Motorsports	(United States) Darren Law (United States) Seth Neiman	Porsche 997 GT3-RSR	MI	89
18	GT	44	(United States) Flying Lizard Motorsports	(United States) Darren Law (United States) Seth Neiman	Porsche 4.0 L Flat-6	MI	89
19	LMP1	12	(United States) Autocon	(Canada) Tony Burgess (United States) Chris McMurry	Lola B06/10	D	88
19	LMP1	12	(United States) Autocon	(Canada) Tony Burgess (United States) Chris McMurry	AER P32C 4.0 L Turbo V8 (Isobutanol)	D	88
20	GT	98	(United States) JaguarRSR	(United States) P. J. Jones (United States) Rocky Moran Jr.	Jaguar XKR GT	D	88
20	GT	98	(United States) JaguarRSR	(United States) P. J. Jones (United States) Rocky Moran Jr.	Jaguar 5.0 L V8	D	88
21	GT	99	(United States) JaguarRSR	(Brazil) Bruno Junqueira (Canada) Kenny Wilden	Jaguar XKR GT	D	88
21	GT	99	(United States) JaguarRSR	(Brazil) Bruno Junqueira (Canada) Kenny Wilden	Jaguar 5.0 L V8	D	88
22	**GTC**	**66**	**(United States) TRG**	**(United States) Duncan Ende (United States) Spencer Pumpelly**	**Porsche 997 GT3 Cup**	Y	**87**
22	**GTC**	**66**	**(United States) TRG**	**(United States) Duncan Ende (United States) Spencer Pumpelly**	**Porsche 4.0 L Flat-6**	Y	**87**
23	GTC	54	(United States) Black Swan Racing	(United States) Tim Pappas (Netherlands) Jeroen Bleekemolen	Porsche 997 GT3 Cup	Y	87
23	GTC	54	(United States) Black Swan Racing	(United States) Tim Pappas (Netherlands) Jeroen Bleekemolen	Porsche 4.0 L Flat-6	Y	87
24	GTC	77	(United States) Magnus Racing	(United States) John Potter (United States) Craig Stanton	Porsche 997 GT3 Cup	Y	87
24	GTC	77	(United States) Magnus Racing	(United States) John Potter (United States) Craig Stanton	Porsche 4.0 L Flat-6	Y	87
25	LMPC	18	(United States) Performance Tech Motorsports	(United States) Anthony Nicolosi (United States) Jarrett Boon	Oreca FLM09	MI	87
25	LMPC	18	(United States) Performance Tech Motorsports	(United States) Anthony Nicolosi (United States) Jarrett Boon	Chevrolet LS3 6.2 L V8	MI	87
26	GTC	11	(United States) JDX Racing	(United States) Nick Ham (United States) Chris Cumming	Porsche 997 GT3 Cup	Y	87
26	GTC	11	(United States) JDX Racing	(United States) Nick Ham (United States) Chris Cumming	Porsche 4.0 L Flat-6	Y	87
27 DNF	GT	62	(United States) Risi Competizione	(Brazil) Jaime Melo (Finland) Toni Vilander	Ferrari 458 Italia GT2	MI	86
27 DNF	GT	62	(United States) Risi Competizione	(Brazil) Jaime Melo (Finland) Toni Vilander	Ferrari 4.5 L V8	MI	86
28	GTC	23	(United States) Alex Job Racing	(United States) Bill Sweedler (United States) Leh Keen	Porsche 997 GT3 Cup	Y	86
28	GTC	23	(United States) Alex Job Racing	(United States) Bill Sweedler (United States) Leh Keen	Porsche 4.0 L Flat-6	Y	86
29	GT	40	(United States) Robertson Racing	(United States) Andrea Robertson (United States) Melanie Snow	Ford GT-R Mk.VII	MI	86
29	GT	40	(United States) Robertson Racing	(United States) Andrea Robertson (United States) Melanie Snow	Élan 5.0 L V8	MI	86
30	GTC	34	(United States) Green Hornet (United States) Black Swan Racing	(United States) Peter LeSaffre (United States) Andrew Davis	Porsche 997 GT3 Cup	Y	85
30	GTC	34	(United States) Green Hornet (United States) Black Swan Racing	(United States) Peter LeSaffre (United States) Andrew Davis	Porsche 4.0 L Flat-6	Y	85
31	GTC	68	(United States) TRG	(South Africa) Dion von Moltke (United States) Mark Bunting	Porsche 997 GT3 Cup	Y	82
31	GTC	68	(United States) TRG	(South Africa) Dion von Moltke (United States) Mark Bunting	Porsche 4.0 L Flat-6	Y	82
32 DNF	GT	02	(United States) Extreme Speed Motorsports	(United States) Ed Brown (United States) Guy Cosmo	Ferrari 458 Italia GT2	MI	78
32 DNF	GT	02	(United States) Extreme Speed Motorsports	(United States) Ed Brown (United States) Guy Cosmo	Ferrari 4.5 L V8	MI	78
33 DNF	LMP1	20	(United States) Oryx Dyson Racing	(United Arab Emirates) Humaid Al Masaood (United Kingdom) Steven Kane	Lola B09/86	D	38
33 DNF	LMP1	20	(United States) Oryx Dyson Racing	(United Arab Emirates) Humaid Al Masaood (United Kingdom) Steven Kane	Mazda MZR-R 2.0 L Turbo I4 (Isobutanol)	D	38

American Le Mans Series
Previous race: Grand Prix of Mosport	2011 season	Next race: Road Race Showcase
