= Panoz Abruzzi =

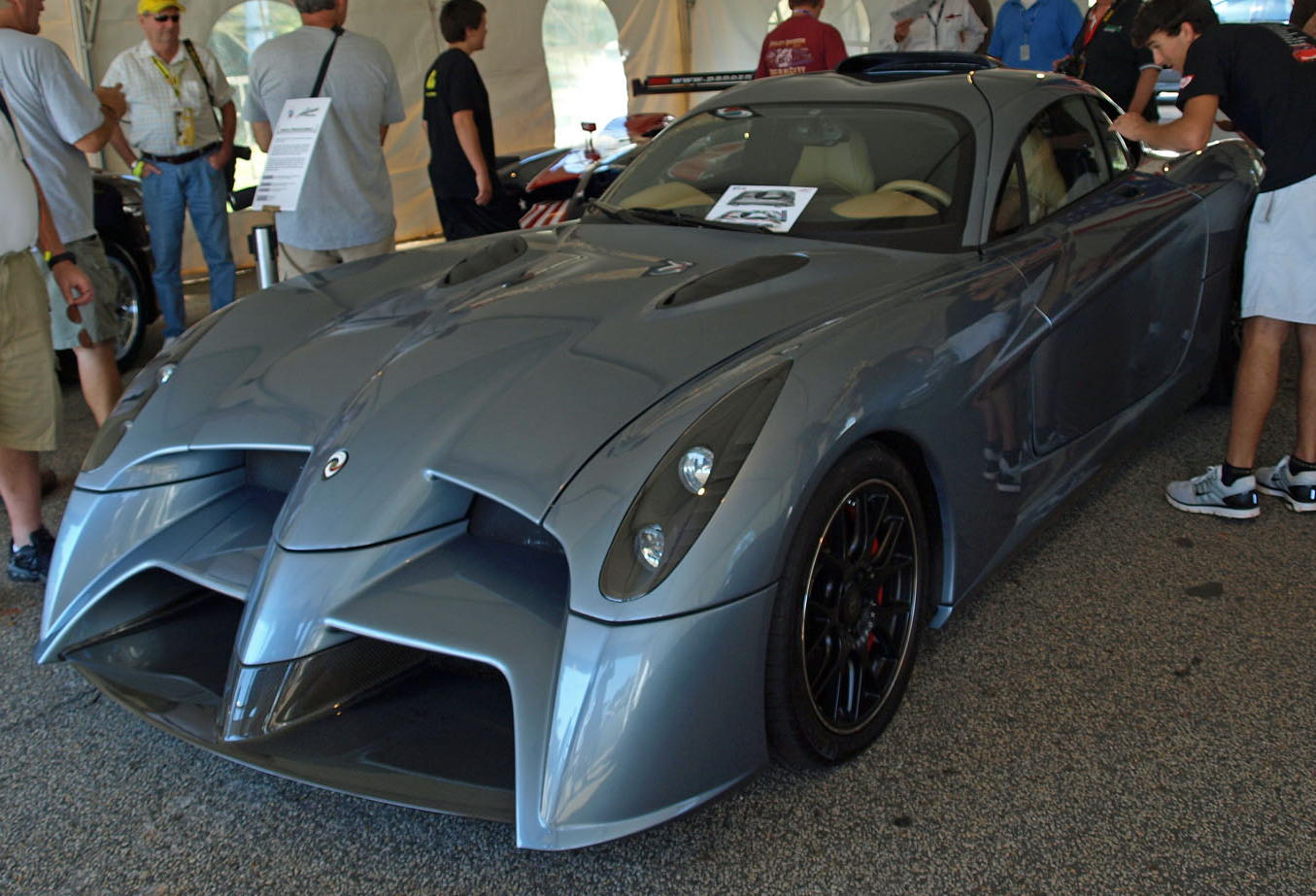

Overview
- Manufacturer: Panoz Auto Development
- Production: Proposed 2011
- Assembly: Braselton, Georgia, United States

Body and chassis
- Class: Grand tourer (S)
- Body style: 2-door coupé
- Layout: FR layout

Powertrain
- Engine: 6.2L (6,162 cc) supercharged LS3 V8
- Transmission: 6-speed manual

The Panoz Abruzzi was a grand tourer intended for manufacture by Panoz Auto Development for the European market. Production was to be limited to 81 units and it was expected to be delivered between 2011 and 2013, with a retail price of around £330,000. Much of the car was to be made of a multilayer composite known as REAMS (Recyclable Energy Absorbing Matrix System), which Panoz claimed was as strong as carbon fiber but was more durable and could have been recycled.

The Abruzzi made its sports car racing debut at the 12 Hours of Sebring in 2011.

In July 2014, production of the Abruzzi was not confirmed and it no longer appeared on the company's website.

The name of the car refers to the old name of Italian region of Abruzzo, where Don Panoz's grandfather lived before the 1915 earthquake forced him and his family to move to United States.

== Performance ==
The Abruzzi was planned to be powered by a supercharged 6.2L (6,162 cc) LS3 V8 engine that produces 650 hp (485 kW) and 590 lb⋅ft (800 N⋅m) of torque. It also features a "Trifecta" cooling system that uses multiple rear mounted radiators in addition to other cooling systems to keep coolant temperatures down.

== Gallery ==
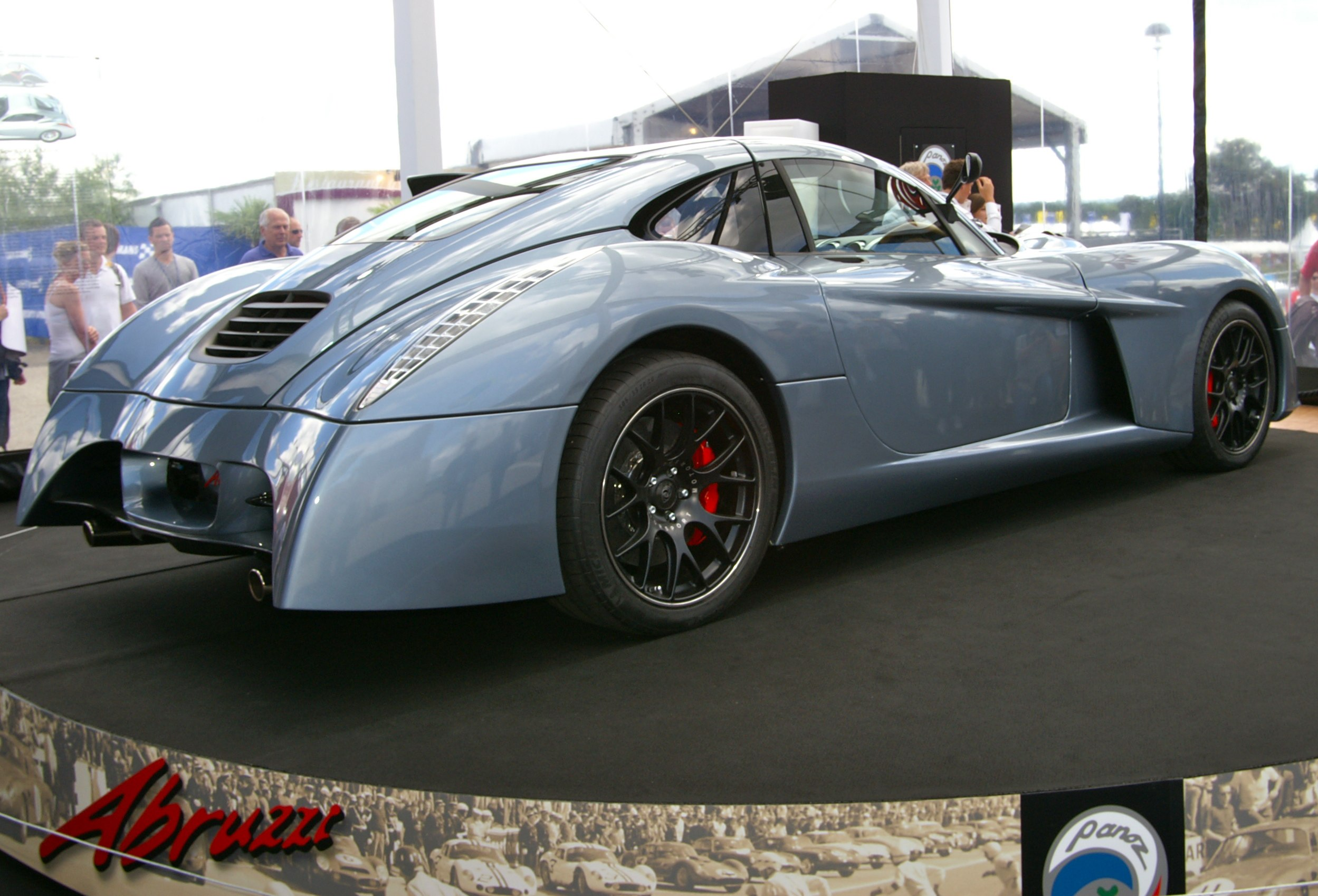
Rear ¾ view

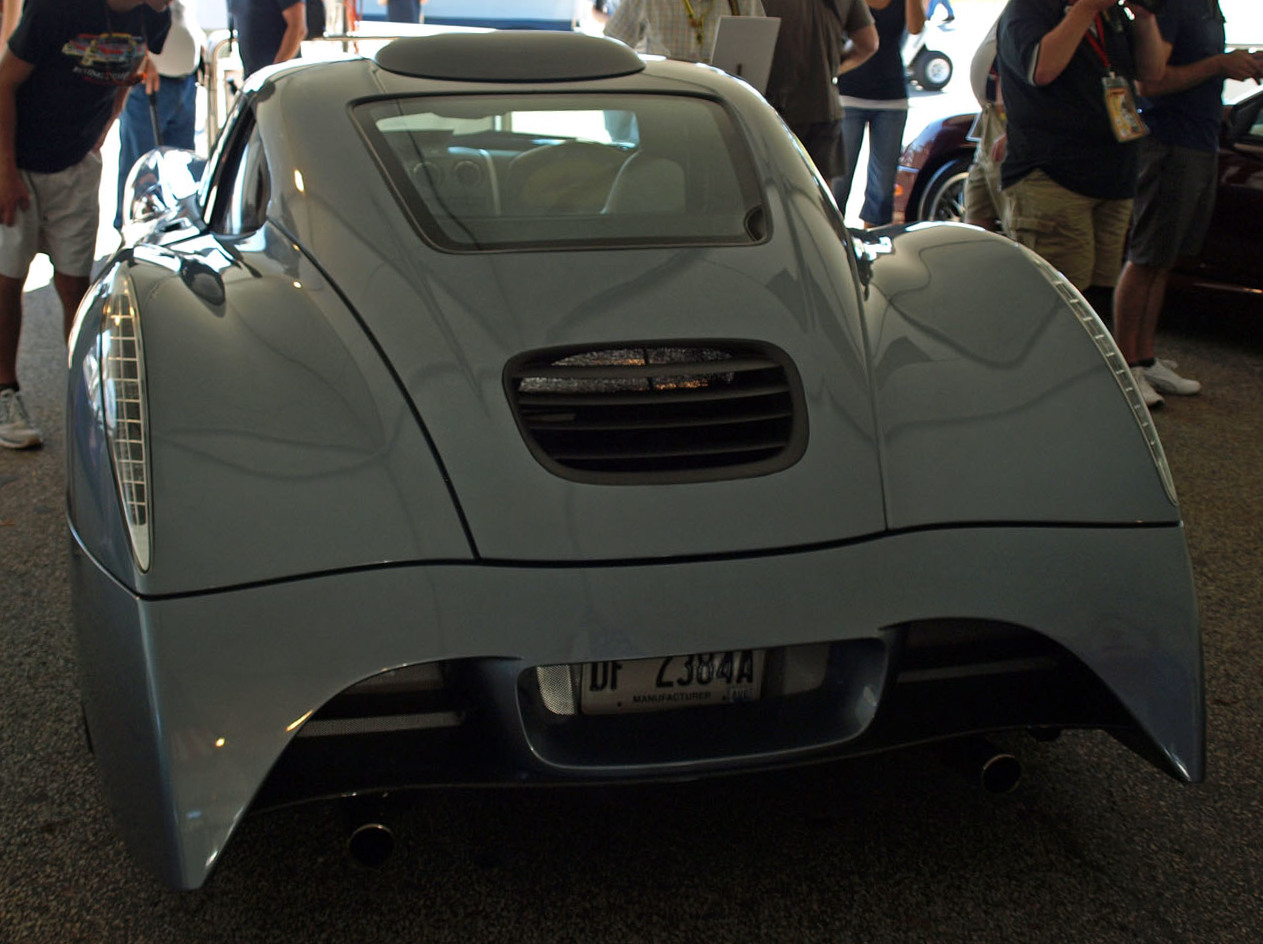
Rear end

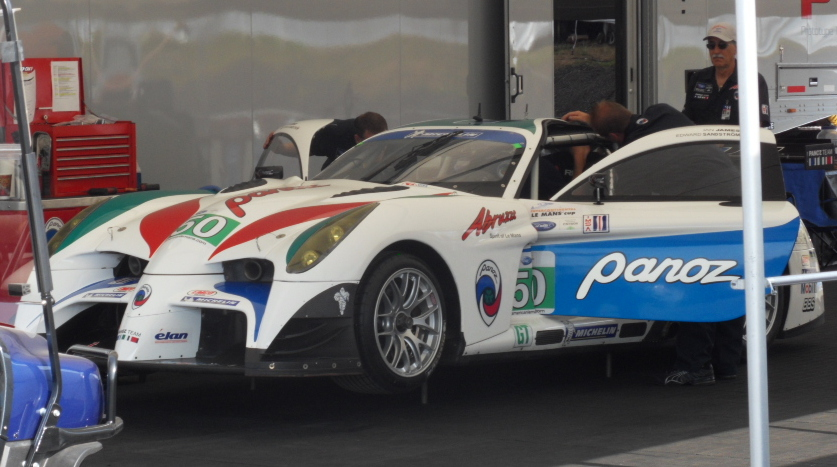
Panoz Abruzzi GT2 racecar

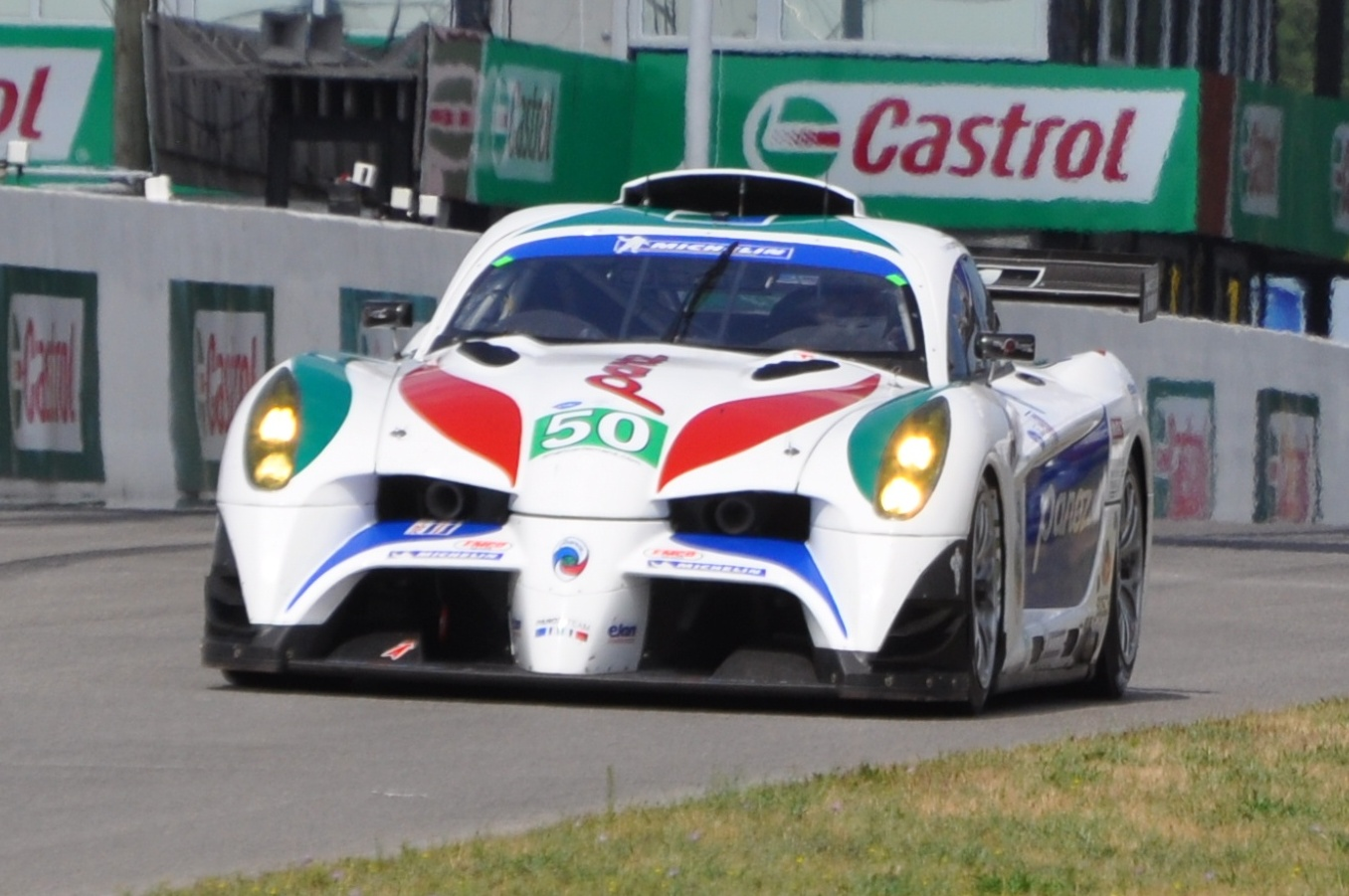
Panoz Abruzzi GT2 on track
