= 2011 American Le Mans Series at Long Beach =

Long Beach Street Circuit

The 2011 Tequila Patrón American Le Mans Series at Long Beach was held at Long Beach Street Circuit on April 16, 2011. It was the second round of the 2011 American Le Mans Series season.

== Qualifying ==
=== Qualifying result ===
Pole position winners in each class are marked in bold.

Pos	Class	Team	Driver	Lap Time	Grid
1	**LMP1**	**#16 Dyson Racing Team**	**Guy Smith**	**1:14.001**	**1**
2	LMP1	#6 Muscle Milk Aston Martin Racing	Klaus Graf	1:14.453	2
3	**LMPC**	**#06 CORE Autosport**	**Gunnar Jeannette**	**1:17.736**	**3**
4	LMPC	#89 Intersport Racing	Kyle Marcelli	1:18.124	4
5	LMPC	#52 PR1 Mathiasen Motorsports	Alex Figge	1:18.286	5
6	LMPC	#63 Genoa Racing	Elton Julian	1:18.690	6
7	**GT**	**#56 BMW Team RLL**	**Joey Hand**	**1:19.090**	**7**
8	GT	#4 Corvette Racing	Jan Magnussen	1:19.137	8
9	GT	#55 BMW Team RLL	Bill Auberlen	1:19.447	9
10	GT	#45 Flying Lizard Motorsports	Patrick Long	1:19.463	10
11	GT	#17 Team Falken Tire	Wolf Henzler	1:20.065	11
12	GT	#01 Extreme Speed Motorsports	Johannes van Overbeek	1:20.167	12
13	GT	#02 Extreme Speed Motorsports	Guy Cosmo	1:20.176	13
14	GT	#48 Paul Miller Racing	Sascha Maassen	1:20.646	14
15	GT	#3 Corvette Racing	Tommy Milner	1:20.724	15
16	GT	#99 Jaguar RSR	Bruno Junqueira	1:20.924	16
17	LMPC	#05 CORE Autosport	Frankie Montecalvo	1:21.387	17
18	GT	#98 Jaguar RSR	Paul Gentilozzi	1:22.244	18
19	**GTC**	**#54 Black Swan Racing**	**Jeroen Bleekemolen**	**1:23.179**	**19**
20	GTC	#23 Alex Job Racing	Leh Keen	1:23.853	20
21	GT	#08 West Yokohama Racing	Dominik Schwager	1:23.906	21
22	GTC	#66 TRG	Spencer Pumpelly	1:24.134	22
23	GTC	#77 Magnus Racing	Craig Stanton	1:24.362	23
24	GTC	#32 GMG Racing	James Sofronas	1:24.651	24
25	GTC	#68 TRG	Dion von Moltke	1:24.878	25
26	GT	#44 Flying Lizard Motorsports	Seth Neiman	1:25.543	26
27	GTC	#11 JDX Racing	Nick Ham	1:25.743	27
28	GT	#62 Risi Competizione	Jaime Melo	1:48.071	28
29	**LMP2**	**#33 Level 5 Motorsports**	**No Time**		**29**
30	LMP2	#055 Level 5 Motorsports	No Time		30
31	LMPC	#18 Performance Tech Motorsports	No Time		31

== Race ==
=== Race result ===
Class winners in bold. Cars failing to complete 70% of their class winner's distance are marked as Not Classified (NC).

Pos	Class	No	Team	Drivers	Chassis	Tire	Laps
Pos	Class	No	Team	Drivers	Engine	Tire	Laps
1	**LMP1**	**6**	**(United States) Muscle Milk Aston Martin Racing**	**(Germany) Lucas Luhr (Germany) Klaus Graf**	**Lola-Aston Martin B08/62**	M	**83**
1	**LMP1**	**6**	**(United States) Muscle Milk Aston Martin Racing**	**(Germany) Lucas Luhr (Germany) Klaus Graf**	**Aston Martin AM04 6.0 L V12**	M	**83**
2	LMP1	16	(United States) Dyson Racing Team	(United States) Chris Dyson (United Kingdom) Guy Smith	Lola B09/86	D	83
2	LMP1	16	(United States) Dyson Racing Team	(United States) Chris Dyson (United Kingdom) Guy Smith	Mazda MZR-R 2.0 L Turbo I4 (Isobutanol)	D	83
3	**LMPC**	**06**	**(United States) CORE Autosport**	**(United States) Gunnar Jeannette (Mexico) Ricardo González**	**Oreca FLM09**	M	**81**
3	**LMPC**	**06**	**(United States) CORE Autosport**	**(United States) Gunnar Jeannette (Mexico) Ricardo González**	**Chevrolet LS3 6.2 L V8**	M	**81**
4	LMPC	89	(United States) Intersport Racing	(Canada) Kyle Marcelli (United States) Tomy Drissi	Oreca FLM09	M	81
4	LMPC	89	(United States) Intersport Racing	(Canada) Kyle Marcelli (United States) Tomy Drissi	Chevrolet LS3 6.2 L V8	M	81
5	**GT**	**56**	**(United States) BMW Team RLL**	**(Germany) Dirk Müller (United States) Joey Hand**	**BMW M3 GT2**	D	**81**
5	**GT**	**56**	**(United States) BMW Team RLL**	**(Germany) Dirk Müller (United States) Joey Hand**	**BMW S65B40 4.0 L V8**	D	**81**
6	GT	4	(United States) Corvette Racing	(United Kingdom) Oliver Gavin (Denmark) Jan Magnussen	Chevrolet Corvette C6.R	M	81
6	GT	4	(United States) Corvette Racing	(United Kingdom) Oliver Gavin (Denmark) Jan Magnussen	Chevrolet 5.5 L V8	M	81
7	GT	62	(United States) Risi Competizione	(Brazil) Jaime Melo (Finland) Toni Vilander	Ferrari 458 Italia GT2	M	81
7	GT	62	(United States) Risi Competizione	(Brazil) Jaime Melo (Finland) Toni Vilander	Ferrari F136 4.5 L V8	M	81
8	GT	17	(United States) Team Falken Tire	(Germany) Wolf Henzler (United States) Bryan Sellers	Porsche 997 GT3-RSR	F	80
8	GT	17	(United States) Team Falken Tire	(Germany) Wolf Henzler (United States) Bryan Sellers	Porsche M97/74 4.0 L Flat-6	F	80
9	LMPC	63	(United States) Genoa Racing	(United States) Eric Lux (United States) Elton Julian	Oreca FLM09	M	80
9	LMPC	63	(United States) Genoa Racing	(United States) Eric Lux (United States) Elton Julian	Chevrolet LS3 6.2 L V8	M	80
10	GT	3	(United States) Corvette Racing	(Monaco) Olivier Beretta (United States) Tommy Milner	Chevrolet Corvette C6.R	M	80
10	GT	3	(United States) Corvette Racing	(Monaco) Olivier Beretta (United States) Tommy Milner	Chevrolet 5.5 L V8	M	80
11	LMPC	05	(United States) CORE Autosport	(United States) Jon Bennett (United States) Frankie Montecalvo	Oreca FLM09	M	79
11	LMPC	05	(United States) CORE Autosport	(United States) Jon Bennett (United States) Frankie Montecalvo	Chevrolet LS3 6.2 L V8	M	79
12	GT	99	(United States) JaguarRSR	(Brazil) Bruno Junqueira (Brazil) Cristiano da Matta	Jaguar XKR GT2	D	79
12	GT	99	(United States) JaguarRSR	(Brazil) Bruno Junqueira (Brazil) Cristiano da Matta	Jaguar AJ133S 5.0 L V8	D	79
13	GT	55	(United States) BMW Team RLL	(United States) Bill Auberlen (Germany) Dirk Werner	BMW M3 GT2	D	79
13	GT	55	(United States) BMW Team RLL	(United States) Bill Auberlen (Germany) Dirk Werner	BMW S65B40 4.0 L V8	D	79
14	GT	44	(United States) Flying Lizard Motorsports	(United States) Darren Law (United States) Seth Neiman	Porsche 997 GT3-RSR	M	78
14	GT	44	(United States) Flying Lizard Motorsports	(United States) Darren Law (United States) Seth Neiman	Porsche M97/74 4.0 L Flat-6	M	78
15	**GTC**	**54**	**(United States) Black Swan Racing**	**(United States) Tim Pappas (Netherlands) Jeroen Bleekemolen**	**Porsche 997 GT3 Cup**	Y	**77**
15	**GTC**	**54**	**(United States) Black Swan Racing**	**(United States) Tim Pappas (Netherlands) Jeroen Bleekemolen**	**Porsche 4.0 L Flat-6**	Y	**77**
16	GT	02	(United States) Extreme Speed Motorsports	(United States) Ed Brown (United States) Guy Cosmo	Ferrari 458 Italia GT2	M	77
16	GT	02	(United States) Extreme Speed Motorsports	(United States) Ed Brown (United States) Guy Cosmo	Ferrari 4.5 L V8	M	77
17	GTC	23	(United States) Alex Job Racing	(United States) Bill Sweedler (United States) Leh Keen	Porsche 997 GT3 Cup	Y	77
17	GTC	23	(United States) Alex Job Racing	(United States) Bill Sweedler (United States) Leh Keen	Porsche 4.0 L Flat-6	Y	77
18	LMPC	52	(United States) PR1 Mathiasen Motorsports	(United States) Alex Figge (United States) Miles Maroney	Oreca FLM09	M	77
18	LMPC	52	(United States) PR1 Mathiasen Motorsports	(United States) Alex Figge (United States) Miles Maroney	Chevrolet LS3 6.2 L V8	M	77
19	GTC	77	(United States) Magnus Racing	(United States) John Potter (United States) Craig Stanton	Porsche 997 GT3 Cup	Y	76
19	GTC	77	(United States) Magnus Racing	(United States) John Potter (United States) Craig Stanton	Porsche 4.0 L Flat-6	Y	76
20	GT	08	(United States) West Yokohama Racing	(Netherlands) Nicky Pastorelli (Germany) Dominik Schwager	Lamborghini Gallardo LP560 GT2	Y	75
20	GT	08	(United States) West Yokohama Racing	(Netherlands) Nicky Pastorelli (Germany) Dominik Schwager	Lamborghini CEH 5.2 L V10	Y	75
21	GTC	11	(United States) JDX Racing	(United States) Nick Ham (United States) Scott Blackett	Porsche 997 GT3 Cup	Y	71
21	GTC	11	(United States) JDX Racing	(United States) Nick Ham (United States) Scott Blackett	Porsche 4.0 L Flat-6	Y	71
22 DNF	GT	01	(United States) Extreme Speed Motorsports	(United States) Scott Sharp (United States) Johannes van Overbeek	Ferrari 458 Italia GT2	M	70
22 DNF	GT	01	(United States) Extreme Speed Motorsports	(United States) Scott Sharp (United States) Johannes van Overbeek	Ferrari F136 4.5 L V8	M	70
23 DNF	GTC	68	(United States) TRG	(South Africa) Dion von Moltke (United States) Brendan Gaughan	Porsche 997 GT3 Cup	Y	70
23 DNF	GTC	68	(United States) TRG	(South Africa) Dion von Moltke (United States) Brendan Gaughan	Porsche 4.0 L Flat-6	Y	70
24 DNF	GT	48	(United States) Paul Miller Racing	(United States) Bryce Miller (Germany) Sascha Maassen	Porsche 997 GT3-RSR	Y	68
24 DNF	GT	48	(United States) Paul Miller Racing	(United States) Bryce Miller (Germany) Sascha Maassen	Porsche M97/74 4.0 L Flat-6	Y	68
25 DNF	**LMP2**	**33**	**(United States) Level 5 Motorsports**	**(United States) Scott Tucker (France) Christophe Bouchut**	**Lola B11/40**	M	**45**
25 DNF	**LMP2**	**33**	**(United States) Level 5 Motorsports**	**(United States) Scott Tucker (France) Christophe Bouchut**	**HPD HR28TT 2.8 L Turbo V6**	M	**45**
26 DNF	GTC	66	(United States) TRG	(United States) Duncan Ende (United States) Spencer Pumpelly	Porsche 997 GT3 Cup	Y	36
26 DNF	GTC	66	(United States) TRG	(United States) Duncan Ende (United States) Spencer Pumpelly	Porsche 4.0 L Flat-6	Y	36
27 DNF	GT	45	(United States) Flying Lizard Motorsports	(Germany) Jörg Bergmeister (United States) Patrick Long	Porsche 997 GT3-RSR	M	31
27 DNF	GT	45	(United States) Flying Lizard Motorsports	(Germany) Jörg Bergmeister (United States) Patrick Long	Porsche M97/74 4.0 L Flat-6	M	31
28 DNF	GT	98	(United States) JaguarRSR	(United States) P. J. Jones (United States) Paul Gentilozzi	Jaguar XKR GT2	D	2
28 DNF	GT	98	(United States) JaguarRSR	(United States) P. J. Jones (United States) Paul Gentilozzi	Jaguar AJ133S 5.0 L V8	D	2
29 DNF	GTC	32	(United States) GMG Racing	(United States) Bret Curtis (United States) James Sofronas	Porsche 997 GT3 Cup	Y	2
29 DNF	GTC	32	(United States) GMG Racing	(United States) Bret Curtis (United States) James Sofronas	Porsche 4.0 L Flat-6	Y	2
DNS	LMP2	055	(United States) Level 5 Motorsports	(United States) Scott Tucker (Mexico) Luis Díaz	Lola B11/40	M	-
DNS	LMP2	055	(United States) Level 5 Motorsports	(United States) Scott Tucker (Mexico) Luis Díaz	HPD HR28TT 2.8 L Turbo V6	M	-
DNS	LMPC	18	(United States) Performance Tech Motorsports	(United States) Anthony Nicolosi (United States) Jarrett Boon	Oreca FLM09	M	-
DNS	LMPC	18	(United States) Performance Tech Motorsports	(United States) Anthony Nicolosi (United States) Jarrett Boon	Chevrolet LS3 6.2 L V8	M	-

American Le Mans Series
Previous race: 12 Hours of Sebring	2011 season	Next race: Northeast Grand Prix
