= James Sofronas =

American entrepreneur

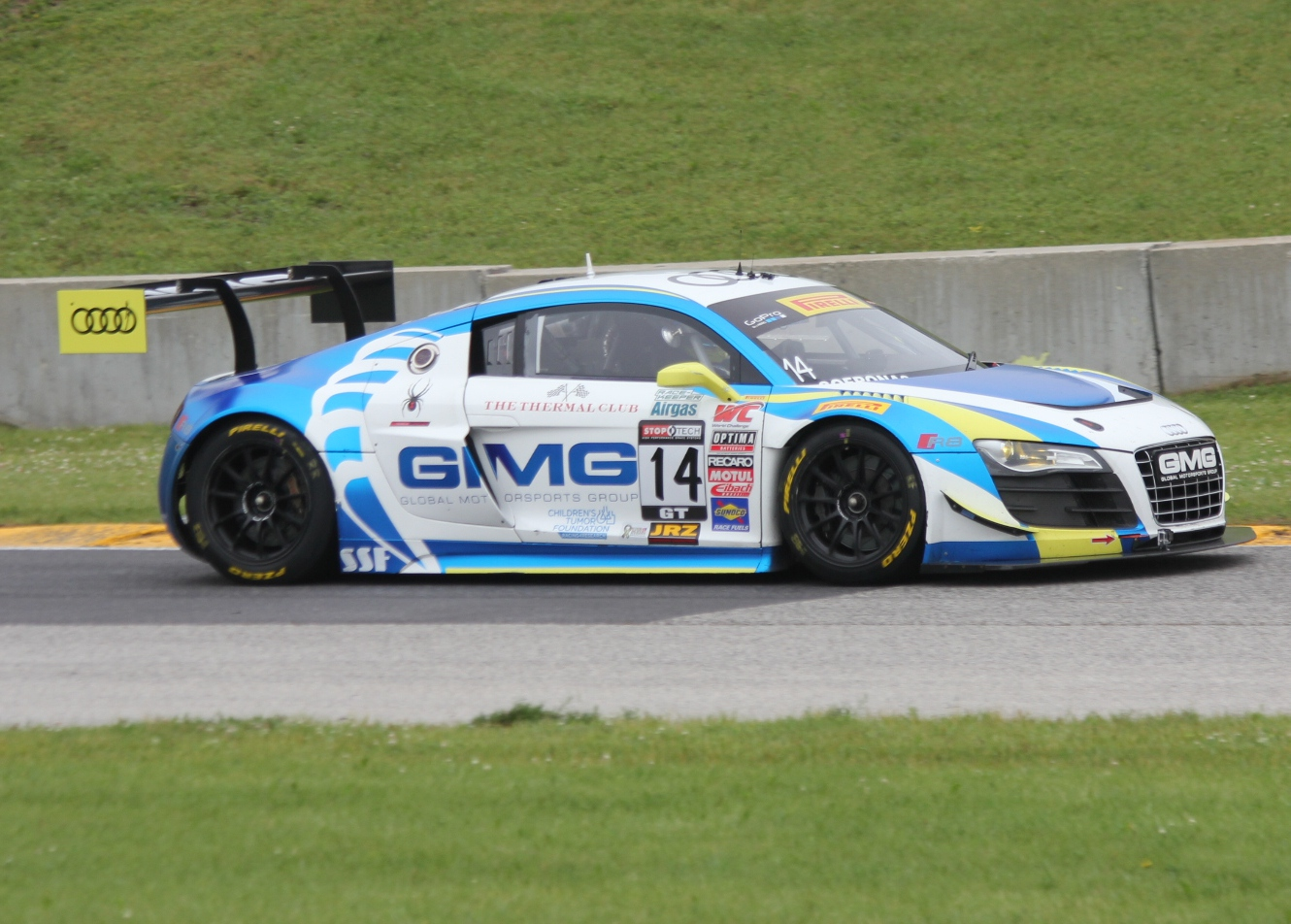
- Born: September 9, 1968 (age 58) Westchester County, New York, United States

GT America Series career
- Debut season: 2021
- Current team: GMG Racing
- Categorisation: FIA Silver (until 2015); FIA Bronze (2016–)
- Car number: 14
- Starts: 6
- Wins: 3
- Podiums: 4
- Poles: 3
- Fastest laps: 2

Previous series
- 2020 2019 2019 2016, 2019 2014, 2021 2009, 2011–12 2009–12 2004–06, 2008, 2017–18 1994–2020: GT Sports Club America; GT Sports Club; GT4 America Series; Lamborghini Super Trofeo North America; IMSA SportsCar Championship; Rolex Sports Car Series; American Le Mans Series; Michelin Pilot Challenge Pirelli World Challenge

Championship titles
- 2018 2018 2017 2017: Pirelli World Challenge SprintX – GTS; Pirelli World Challenge – GTS; Pirelli World Challenge – GTA; Pirelli World Challenge SprintX – GT Pro/Am

James Sofronas (born September 9, 1968) is an American racing driver and the founder of Global Motorsports Group.

== Motorsports career ==
Sofronas began his racing career in the early 1990s, purchasing a Nissan NX 2000 which was eligible for the SCCA SSB category. In order to make enough money to race it, Sofronas worked as a salesman at Pitney Bowes, using the street-legal car on sales calls despite the fact it had no air conditioning unit. In 1994, he acquired an SCCA Pro Racing license and took part in the SCCA Pro Racing World Challenge, driving an Oldsmobile Achieva in the Super Production class, which he rented from Chuck Hemingson for $1,800. In his lone outing that season at Road America, Sofronas finished ninth in class.

Sofronas began racing under the GMG Racing banner in the early 2000s; the team is used to advertise his auto tuning service he operates out of Southern California. He scored his first victory in the then-Speed World Challenge in 2008 at New Jersey Motorsports Park, en route to a fourth-placed finish in the championship. He would finish runner-up in the GT class the following season, scoring two wins and four podiums. That same season, Sofronas began competing in the American Le Mans Series, beginning with a one-off appearance at Laguna Seca with co-driver Bret Curtis, where the duo finished fifth in class. Sofronas and GMG Racing would continue to run a partial schedule in the series until 2012.

In 2017, Sofronas claimed a pair of titles in the Pirelli World Challenge, claiming the overall GTA title and the SprintX GT Pro/Am title. Partnering with Porsche factory drivers Laurens Vanthoor and Mathieu Jaminet, Sofronas took the SprintX title by just 13 points over Jan Heylen and Michael Schein. He scored 11 class victories in 19 starts between the two championships that season. He followed his championship haul in 2017 with two more in 2018, this time competing in GT4 machinery. Sofronas and co-driver Alex Welch claimed the SprintX GTS title, while Sofronas alone won the GTS class title overall.

In 2023, Sofronas began his 30th season of competition under the World Challenge/SRO America umbrella, fielding the first Audi R8 LMS Evo II on American soil. During the GT America Series event at Circuit of the Americas, Sofronas tallied his 350th World Challenge/SRO event appearance.

== GMG Racing ==
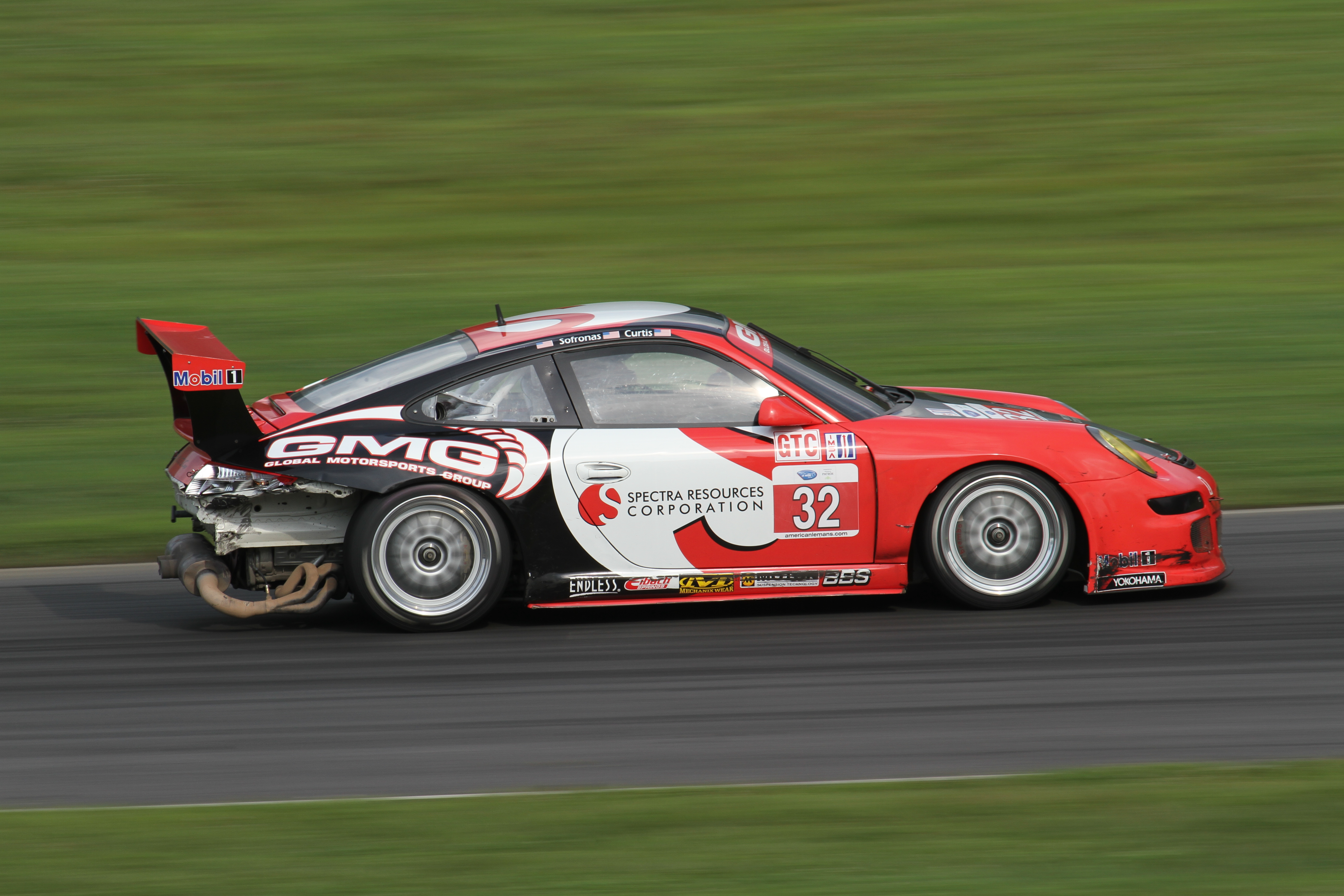
GMG Racing's Porsche at Lime Rock Park in 2010

Sofronas and business partner Fabrice Kutyba founded Global Motorsports Group (GMG) in 2001, an aftermarket tuning service with a particular focus on European luxury marques. The two opened a shop in 2006, before upgrading to a 16,000 square-foot facility two years later. In August 2021, GMG opened temporary 8,000 square-foot shop at the Thermal Club, with plans to have a 23,000 square-foot facility completed at the site by summer 2023.

The company services Porsche, Ferrari, Audi, Mercedes-Benz, and BMW models, among others. Services include standard maintenance such as oil changes, as well as performance tuning. The group also operates a customer racing program in the SRO America umbrella of series, including the GT America Series, GT4 America Series, and GT World Challenge America. Their racing endeavors are closely intertwined with their tuning operations, with a series of World Challenge-based performance products being released in 2008. The team has won a number of titles in the Pirelli World Challenge, including a 2017 GTSA class victory for George Kurtz accompanying Sofronas' titles. In 2021, the team added a title in the inaugural season of the GT America Series with customer driver Jason Bell.

The team also works closely with Audi Sport, debuting and competing with the marque's racing cars. In 2012, GMG Racing became the first American providers of the new Audi R8 LMS GT3. In September 2019, Sofronas took part in the global debut of the Audi R8 LMS GT2 at the Circuit de Barcelona-Catalunya. At the SRO GT Anniversary, Sofronas fielded an Audi R8 LMS ultra, one of just two in the field. Ahead of the 2023 season, the team acquired an Audi R8 LMS Evo II, and were awaiting delivery of a Type-992 Porsche 911 GT3 R.

In 2021, the team expanded their relationship with Italian manufacturer Lamborghini, acquiring a Huracán GT3 Evo as part of a partnership with FFF Racing Team.

== Racing record ==
=== Career summary ===
Season	Series	Team	Races	Wins	Poles	F/Laps	Podiums	Points	Position
1994	SCCA Pro Racing World Challenge - Super Production	National Wheels & Tires	1	0	?	?	0	17	32nd
1995	SCCA Pro Racing World Challenge - Super Production	Greek Brothers Racing	6	0	0	?	0	131	14th
1996	SCCA Pro Racing World Challenge - T2	Greek Brothers Racing	3	0	0	?	0	42	18th
1996	SCCA Pro Racing World Challenge - T1	Greek Brothers Racing	1	0	0	?	0	17	36th
1997	SCCA Pro Racing World Challenge - T2	Greek Brothers Racing	2	0	0	0	0	25	27th
1998	SCCA Pro Racing World Challenge - T2	Greek Brothers Racing	1	0	0	0	0	15	31st
1999	SpeedVision World Challenge - Touring Car	Peppa Seed Racing	1	0	0	?	0	20	34th
2000	SpeedVision World Challenge - Touring Car	Peppa Seed Racing	2	0	0	?	0	11	45th
2000	SpeedVision World Challenge - GT	SSF / GMG Racing	1	0	0	?	0	?	?
2001	SpeedVision World Challenge - GT	SSF Parts / TC Kline	8	0	0	0	0	76	14th
2002	Speed World Challenge - Touring Car	SSF Imported Parts / GMG Racing	5	0	0	0	0	53	24th
2003	Speed World Challenge - Touring Car	Tecmark Autosport / Lectric Air	9	0	0	?	0	42	27th
2004	Speed World Challenge - Touring Car	Tecmark Corp / GMG Racing	10	0	0	?	2	196	4th
2004	Grand-Am Cup - GS	Anchor Racing	6	0	?	?	0	75	41st
2004	Grand-Am Cup - ST	DF Motorsports	?	?	?	?	?	?	?
2005	Speed World Challenge - GT	GMG Racing	6	0	0	0	1	102	15th
2005	Grand-Am Cup - GS	Anchor Racing	7	0	?	?	0	78	52nd
2006	Speed World Challenge - GT	GMG Racing	10	0	0	0	0	156	8th
2006	Grand-Am Cup - GS		1	0	?	?	0	18	86th
2007	Speed World Challenge - TC	Tecmark Autosport / GMG	10	0	0	0	2	205	7th
2007	Speed World Challenge - GT	GMG Racing	10	0	0	0	0	103	11th
2008	Speed World Challenge - GT	GMG Racing	10	1	0	0	1	750	4th
2008	Speed World Challenge - TC	Tecmark Corporation / GMG Racing	3	0	0	0	0	219	17th
2008	Grand-Am KONI Challenge - GS	BGB Motorsports	1	0	0	0	0	17	73rd
2009	Speed World Challenge - GT	GMG Racing	10	2	2	1	4	931	**2nd**
2009	American Le Mans Series - Challenge	GMG Racing	1	0	0	0	0	13	7th
2009	Rolex Sports Car Series - GT	GMG Racing	2	0	0	0	0	24	62nd
2010	SCCA Pro Racing World Challenge - GT	GMG Racing	11	1	1	0	7	1052	**3rd**
2010	American Le Mans Series - GTC	GMG Racing	6	0	0	0	2	60	10th
2011	Pirelli World Challenge - GT	GMG Racing	12	0	1	1	6	1112	4th
2011	American Le Mans Series - GTC	GMG Racing	5	0	0	0	0	36	15th
2011	Rolex Sports Car Series - GT	TRG / BSR / GMG Racing	1	0	0	0	0	16	57th
2012	Pirelli World Challenge - GT	GMG Racing	9	0	0	0	1	723	9th
2012	American Le Mans Series - GTC	GMG Racing	5	0	0	0	2	49	9th
2012	Rolex Sports Car Series - GT	Orbit / GMG Racing	1	0	0	0	0	20	64th
2013	Pirelli World Challenge - GT	GMG Racing	14	3	3	2	9	1444	**2nd**
2014	Pirelli World Challenge - GT	GMG Racing	16	0	0	0	0	1062	6th
2014	United SportsCar Championship - GTD	GMG Racing	2	0	0	0	0	22	79th
2015	Pirelli World Challenge - GT	GMG Racing	13	0	0	0	0	600	20th
2016	Lamborghini Super Trofeo North America - Pro-Am	GMG Racing	2	1	0	0	2	27	8th
2016	Pirelli World Challenge - GT	GMG Racing	7	0	0	0	0	263	17th
2016	Pirelli World Challenge - GTS	GMG Racing	1	0	0	0	0	51	39th
2017	Pirelli World Challenge - GTA	GMG Racing	9	6	3	3	8	211	**1st**
2017	Pirelli World Challenge SprintX - GT Pro-Am	GMG Racing	9	5	1	2	8	227	**1st**
2017	Continental Tire SportsCar Challenge - GS	GMG Racing	1	0	0	0	0	14	36th
2018	Pirelli World Challenge - GTS	GMG Racing	8	0	0	2	3	162	**1st**
2018	Pirelli World Challenge SprintX - GTS	GMG Racing	10	2	0	1	3	176	**1st**
2018	Continental Tire SportsCar Challenge - GS	GMG Racing	1	0	0	0	0	7	71st
2019	GT4 America Series SprintX - Am	GMG Racing	8	2	1	0	6	98	**3rd**
2019	Lamborghini Super Trofeo North America - Am	GMG Racing	2	2	2	1	2	31	5th
2019	GT World Challenge America - Pro/Am	GMG Racing	2	1	0	0	2	40	9th
2019	GT World Challenge America - Am	GMG Racing	2	0	0	0	1	27	9th
2019	GT4 America Series Sprint	GMG Racing	1	0	0	0	0	8	20th
2019	GT Sports Club	Audi Sport Team WRT	2	0	0	0	1	15	15th
2020	GT World Challenge America - Pro/Am	GMG Racing	4	2	2	0	2	58	8th
2020	GT Sports Club America - Titanium	GMG Racing	1	1	1	1	1	?	?
2021	GT America Series - SRO3	GMG Racing	6	3	3	2	4	111	5th
2021	Intercontinental GT Challenge	GMG Racing	1	0	0	0	0	2	20th
2021	IMSA SportsCar Championship - GTD	GMG Racing	1	0	0	0	0	176	66th
2022	Michelin Pilot Challenge - GS	GMG Racing	2	0	0	0	0	300	50th
2022	IMSA SportsCar Championship - GTD	GMG Racing	3	0	0	0	0	323	52nd
2022	GT World Challenge America - Pro/Am	GMG Racing	1	0	0	1	0	24	13th
2022	GT World Challenge America - Am	GMG Racing	2	0	0	0	2	36	5th
2022	Intercontinental GT Challenge	GMG Racing	1	0	0	0	0	6	19th
2022	SRO GT Anniversary	GMG Racing							
2023	GT America Series - GT3	GMG Racing	4	0	1	1	3	48	11th
2023	GT World Challenge America - Pro/Am	GMG Racing	2	0	0	0	0	2	19th
2023	GT4 America Series - Am	GMG Racing	2	0	0	0	0	0	NC
2023	Porsche Carrera Cup North America	GMG Racing	2	2	0	1	2	51	12th
2023	GT World Challenge Europe Endurance Cup	GMG Racing by Car Collection Motorsport	1	0	0	0	0	0	NC
2023	Intercontinental GT Challenge	GMG Racing by Car Collection Motorsport	1	0	0	0	0	0	NC
2024	Porsche Carrera Cup North America	GMG Racing	10	0	0	0	0	9	22nd
2025	Porsche Carrera Cup North America	GMG Racing	10	0	0	0	0	25	18th
2025	McLaren Trophy America	GMG Racing							
2026	Porsche Carrera Cup North America	GMG Racing	4	0	0	0	0	9	24th

^{*} Season still in progress.

=== Complete American Le Mans Series results ===
(key) (Races in bold indicate pole position)

Year	Team	Class	Make	Engine	1	2	3	4	5	6	7	8	9	10	Rank	Points
2009	GMG Racing	Challenge	Porsche 997 GT3 Cup	Porsche 3.6 L Flat-6	MIL	LIM	MDO	ELK; DNS	LGA; 5						7th	13
2010	GMG Racing	GTC	Porsche 997 GT3 Cup	Porsche 3.8L Flat-6	SEB; 7	**LBH**; 2	**LGA**; 10	**MIL**; 7	LIM; 4	MDO; 2	ELK; 8	MOS	PET		10th	60
2011	GMG Racing	GTC	Porsche 997 GT3 Cup	Porsche 4.0L Flat-6	SEB; 8	LBH	LIM; 5	MOS	MDO	ELK; 4	BAL	LGA; 5	PET		15th	36
2012	GMG Racing	GTC	Porsche 997 GT3 Cup	Porsche 4.0L Flat-6	SEB; 7	LBH; 4	LGA; 2	LIM; 3	MOS	MDO	ELK; 5	BAL	VIR	PET	9th	49

=== Complete WeatherTech SportsCar Championship results ===
(key) (Races in bold indicate pole position)

Year	Team	Class	Make	Engine	1	2	3	4	5	6	7	8	9	10	11	12	Rank	Points
2014	GMG Racing	GTD	Audi R8 LMS ultra	Audi 5.2 L V10	DAY; 28	SEB; 11	LGA	DET	WGL	MOS	IND	ELK	VIR	COA	COA		79th	22
2021	GMG Racing	GTD	Porsche 911 GT3 R	Porsche 4.0 L Flat-6	DAY	SEB	MDO	DET	WGL	WGL	LIM	ELK	LGA	LBH; 15	VIR	PET	72nd	176
2022	GMG Racing	GTD	Porsche 911 GT3 R	Porsche MA1.76/MDG.G 4.0 L Flat-6	DAY; 22	SEB	LBH; 10	LGA; 11	MDO	DET	WGL	MOS	LIM	ELK	VIR	PET	52nd	323

^{*} Season still in progress.

=== Complete GT World Challenge Europe results ===
==== GT World Challenge Europe Endurance Cup ====
Year	Team	Car	Class	1	2	3	4	5	6	7	Pos.	Points
2023	GMG Racing by Car Collection Motorsport	Porsche 911 GT3 R (992)	Pro-Am	MNZ	LEC	SPA; 6H; Ret	SPA; 12H; Ret	SPA; 24H; Ret	NÜR	CAT	NC	0

^{*}Season still in progress.
