= SRO GT Anniversary =

2022 auto racing event in Belgium

Race details
Date	28–30 July 2022
Official name	SRO GT Anniversary by Peter Auto
Location	Stavelot, Belgium
Course	Permanent circuit 7.004 km (4.352 mi)
Distance	Race 1; 60 minutes Race 2; 60 minutes
- Qualifying 1

Pole
- Entrant: (Germany) #47 Vitaphone Racing Team
Drivers	(Germany) Alex Müller	(Slovakia) Ivan Vercoutere
Time	2:18.935
- Qualifying 2

Pole
- Entrant: (Germany) #47 Vitaphone Racing Team
Drivers	(Germany) Alex Müller	(Slovakia) Ivan Vercoutere
Time	2:16.769
- Race 1

Podium
First	(Belgium) #3 Belgian Audi Club Team WRT
- (Monaco) Stéphane Ortelli
Second	(United Kingdom) #005 Aston Martin Racing
(South Africa) Jordan Grogor	(United Kingdom) Stuart Hall
Third	(Monaco) #46 Red Bull JMB Racing
(United Kingdom) Joe Macari	(United Kingdom) Harrison Newey

Fastest lap
Driver	TBA	TBA
Time	TBA
- Race 2

Podium
First	(United Kingdom) #005 Aston Martin Racing
(South Africa) Jordan Grogor	(United Kingdom) Stuart Hall
Second	(Monaco) #46 Red Bull JMB Racing
(United Kingdom) Joe Macari	(United Kingdom) Harrison Newey
Third	(Italy) #33 Maserati S.p.A.
- (Netherlands) Niek Hommerson

Fastest lap
Driver	TBA	TBA
- Time

The SRO GT Anniversary by Peter Auto was a one-off auto racing event held at Circuit de Spa-Francorchamps, Belgium, on 28–30 July 2022. The races were contested with GT1, GT2, and GT3-spec cars. The event promoters were Peter Auto and the Stéphane Ratel Organisation (SRO).

== Entry list ==
A 28-car field gathered to contest both races: 11 GT1 cars, 10 GT2 cars, and 7 GT3 cars. Eight manufacturers were represented.

Team	Car	Engine	No.	Drivers
GT1
(United Kingdom) Aston Martin Racing	Aston Martin DBR9	Aston Martin 6.0 L V12	005	(South Africa) Jordan Grogor
(United Kingdom) Aston Martin Racing	Aston Martin DBR9	Aston Martin 6.0 L V12	005	(United Kingdom) Stuart Hall
(United Kingdom) Aston Martin Racing	Aston Martin DBR9	Aston Martin 6.0 L V12	88	(Hong Kong) Philip Kadoorie
(Germany) Young Driver AMR	Aston Martin DBR9	Aston Martin 6.0 L V12	8	(Germany) Franz Wunderlich
(France) Larbre Compétition	Chrysler Viper GTS-R	Chrysler 356-T6 8.0 L V10	12	(France) Jean-Luc Blanchemain
(Germany) Lamborghini Blancpain Reiter	Lamborghini Murciélago LP670 R-SV	Lamborghini 6.5 L V12	24	(France) Stéphane Ratel
(Germany) Lamborghini Blancpain Reiter	Lamborghini Murciélago LP670 R-SV	Lamborghini 6.5 L V12	25	(Czech Republic) Tomáš Enge
(Germany) Lamborghini Blancpain Reiter	Lamborghini Murciélago LP670 R-SV	Lamborghini 6.5 L V12	25	(Slovakia) Štefan Rosina
(Italy) Maserati S.p.A.	Maserati MC12 GT1	Maserati 6.0 L V12	33	(Netherlands) Niek Hommerson
(Monaco) Red Bull JMB Racing	Maserati MC12 GT1	Maserati 6.0 L V12	46	(United Kingdom) Joe Macari
(Monaco) Red Bull JMB Racing	Maserati MC12 GT1	Maserati 6.0 L V12	46	(United Kingdom) Harrison Newey
(Germany) Vitaphone Racing Team	Maserati MC12 GT1	Maserati 6.0 L V12	47	(Germany) Alex Müller
(Germany) Vitaphone Racing Team	Maserati MC12 GT1	Maserati 6.0 L V12	47	(Slovakia) Ivan Vercoutere
(Germany) Vitaphone Racing Team	Aston Martin DBR9	Aston Martin 6.0 L V12	53	(United Kingdom) Richard Meins
GT2
(United Kingdom) EMKA GTC	Porsche 911 GT3-R (996)	Porsche 3.6 L Flat-6	30	(United Kingdom) Lee Maxted-Page
(United Kingdom) EMKA GTC	Porsche 911 GT3-R (996)	Porsche 3.6 L Flat-6	30	(United Kingdom) Mark Sumpter
(Brazil) SS Motorsport – Sunniva	Porsche 911 GT3 RSR (997)	Porsche 3.8 L Flat-6	70	(United Kingdom) Paul Phillips
(France) IMSA Performance Matmut	Porsche 911 GT3-RSR (996)	Porsche 3.6 L Flat-6	76	(United Kingdom) Nick Padmore
(France) IMSA Performance Matmut	Porsche 911 GT3-RSR (996)	Porsche 3.6 L Flat-6	76	(Belgium) Jean-Lou Rihon
(France) IMSA Performance Matmut	Porsche 911 GT3 RSR (997)	Porsche 3.8 L Flat-6	77	(Germany) Michael Erlich
(Germany) Freisinger Motorsport	Porsche 911 GT3-RSR (996)	Porsche 3.6 L Flat-6	86	(Germany) Michael Föveny
(Germany) Freisinger Motorsport	Porsche 911 GT3-RSR (996)	Porsche 3.6 L Flat-6	86	(Germany) Stefan Roitmayer
(Germany) Freisinger Motorsport	Porsche 911 GT3-RSR (996)	Porsche 3.6 L Flat-6	115	(Belgium) Marc Devis
(Germany) Freisinger Motorsport	Porsche 911 GT3-RSR (996)	Porsche 3.6 L Flat-6	115	(Germany) Christian Gläsel
(Canada) Kelly-Moss Road and Race	Porsche 911 GT3-RS (996)	Porsche 3.6 L Flat-6	99	(New Zealand) Simon Evans
(Austria) Konrad Motorsport	Porsche 911 GT2 Evo (993)	Porsche 3.6 L Turbo Flat-6	108	(United Kingdom) Peter Fairbairn
(Austria) Konrad Motorsport	Porsche 911 GT2 Evo (993)	Porsche 3.6 L Turbo Flat-6	108	(United Kingdom) Paul McLean
(Italy) Ferrari S.p.A.	Ferrari F430 GTC Evo	Ferrari 4.3 L V8	120	(Belgium) Guy Fawe
(Italy) Autorlando Sport	Porsche 911 GT3-RSR (996)	Porsche 3.6 L Flat-6	276	(Italy) Maurizio Fratti
GT3
(Belgium) Belgian Audi Club Team WRT	Audi R8 LMS Ultra	Audi 5.2 L V10	3	(Monaco) Stéphane Ortelli
(Hong Kong) Craft-Bamboo Racing	Aston Martin V12 Vantage GT3	Aston Martin 6.0 L V12	7	(Germany) Alexander Lienau
(Hong Kong) Craft-Bamboo Racing	Aston Martin V12 Vantage GT3	Aston Martin 6.0 L V12	7	(Germany) Stephan Jocher
(United States) GMG Racing	Audi R8 LMS Ultra	Audi 5.2 L V10	14	(United States) James Sofronas
(Germany) Mercedes-AMG Team	Mercedes-Benz SLS AMG GT3	Mercedes-Benz 6.2 L V8	81	(France) Andrea Bénézet
(Germany) Reiter Engineering	Lamborghini Gallardo LP560-4	Lamborghini 5.2 L V10	98	(Germany) Roald Goethe
(Switzerland) Toni Seiler Racing	Chevrolet Corvette C6 Z06.R GT3	Chevrolet LS7 7.0 L V8	118	(Switzerland) Peter Joos
(Switzerland) Toni Seiler Racing	Chevrolet Corvette C6 Z06.R GT3	Chevrolet LS7 7.0 L V8	123	(Switzerland) Mirco Seiler

== Race 1 ==
Pos	Class	#	Team	Drivers	Car	Laps	Gap/retired

== Race 2 ==
Pos	Class	#	Team	Drivers	Car	Laps	Gap/Retired
