= 2011 12 Hours of Sebring =

Sports car endurance race

Track map of the Sebring International Raceway

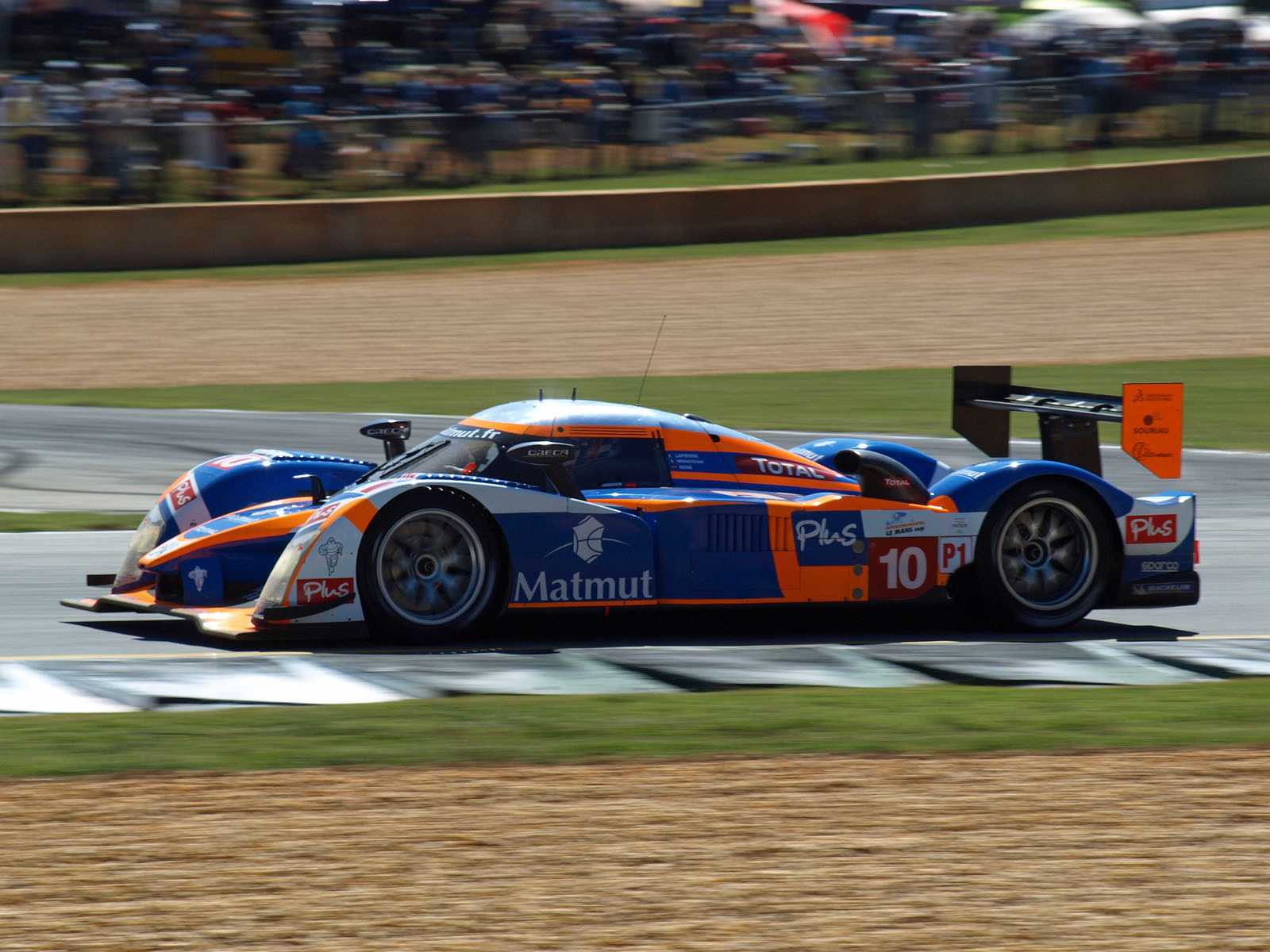
The race-winning No. 10 Peugeot 908 HDi FAP.

The 59th Mobil 1 12 Hours of Sebring presented by Fresh from Florida was held at Sebring International Raceway on March 19, 2011. It was the opening round of the 2011 American Le Mans Series season and the 2011 Intercontinental Le Mans Cup.

== Qualifying ==
=== Qualifying result ===
Pole position winners in each class are marked in bold.

Pos	Class	Team	Driver	Lap Time	Grid
1	**LMP1**	**#8 Peugeot Sport Total**	**Stéphane Sarrazin**	**1:46.571**	**1**
2	LMP1	#1 Audi Sport Team Joest	Romain Dumas	1:47.680	2
3	LMP1	#7 Peugeot Sport Total	Marc Gené	1:48.020	3
4	LMP1	#2 Audi Sport Team Joest	Tom Kristensen	1:48.173	4
5	LMP1	#10 Team Oreca Matmut	Loïc Duval	1:48.569	5
6	LMP1	#06 Muscle Milk Aston Martin Racing	Klaus Graf	1:49.679	6
7	LMP1	#01 Highcroft Racing	Simon Pagenaud	1:49.802	7
8	LMP1	#12 Rebellion Racing	Neel Jani	1:50.756	8
9	LMP1	#15 OAK Racing	Guillaume Moreau	1:51.781	9
10	LMP1	#016 Dyson Racing Team	Chris Dyson	1:52.233	10
11	**LMP2**	**#26 Signatech Nissan**	**Soheil Ayari**	**1:53.815**	**11**
12	**LMPC**	**#036 Genoa Racing**	**Dane Cameron**	**1:55.232**	**12**
13	LMPC	#005 CORE Autosport	Ryan Dalziel	1:55.430	13
14	LMPC	#006 CORE Autosport	Gunnar Jeannette	1:55.905	14
15	LMPC	#052 PR1 Mathiasen Motorsports	Ryan Lewis	1:56.494	15
16	LMP1	#24 OAK Racing	Jean-François Yvon	1:56.498	16
17	LMP2	#055 Level 5 Motorsports	Luis Díaz	1:57.168	17
18	LMPC	#063 Genoa Racing	Eric Lux	1:57.957	18
19	LMPC	#038 Iconik Energy Drinks - WRO	Luca Moro	1:58.231	19
20	LMPC	#089 Intersport Racing	Kyle Marcelli	1:58.391	20
21	LMP2	#35 OAK Racing	Patrice Lafargue	2:00.880	21
22	**GT**	**#51 AF Corse**	**Gianmaria Bruni**	**2:01.561**	**22**
23	GT	#04 Corvette Racing	Oliver Gavin	2:01.743	23
24	GT	#55 BMW Motorsport	Dirk Werner	2:01.841	24
25	GT	#56 BMW Motorsport	Dirk Müller	2:02.139	25
26	GT	#062 Risi Competizione	Jaime Melo	2:02.290	26
27	GT	#045 Flying Lizard Motorsports	Jörg Bergmeister	2:02.334	27
28	GT	#002 Extreme Speed Motorsports	Guy Cosmo	2:02.406	28
29	GT	#59 Luxury Racing	Frédéric Makowiecki	2:02.524	29
30	GT	#03 Corvette Racing	Olivier Beretta	2:02.633	30
31	GT	#001 Extreme Speed Motorsports	Scott Sharp	2:02.877	31
32	**GTE-AM**	**#63 Proton Competition**	**Richard Lietz**	**2:02.942**	**32**
33	GT	#017 Team Falken Tire	Bryan Sellers	2:03.004	33
34	GT	#004 Robertson Racing	Anthony Lazzaro	2:03.309	34
35	GT	#040 Robertson Racing	Boris Said	2:03.454	35
36	GTE-AM	#57 Krohn Racing	Niclas Jönsson	2:03.500	36
37	GTE-AM	#60 Gulf AMR Middle East	Fabien Giroix	2:04.098	37
38	GT	#099 Jaguar RSR	Bruno Junqueira	2:04.260	38
39	GT	#050 Panoz Racing	Ian James	2:04.372	39
40	GTE-AM	#50 Larbre Compétition	Gabriele Gardel	2:04.567	40
41	GT	#098 Jaguar RSR	P. J. Jones	2:05.327	41
42	GT	#048 Paul Miller Racing	Bryce Miller	2:05.784	42
43	GTE-AM	#62 CRS Racing	Pierre Ehret	2:05.993	43
44	**GTC**	**#023 Alex Job Racing**	**Leh Keen**	**2:07.373**	**44**
45	GTC	#077 Magnus Racing	Craig Stanton	2:07.395	45
46	GTC	#054 Black Swan Racing	Damien Faulkner	2:07.433	46
47	GTC	#032 GMG Racing	James Sofronas	2:08.187	47
48	GTC	#034 Kelly Moss Motorsports	Andrew Davis	2:08.248	48
49	GTC	#068 TRG	Dion von Moltke	2:08.578	49
50	GTC	#066 TRG	Duncan Ende	2:08.723	50
51	GTC	#011 JDX Racing	Nick Ham	2:08.887	51
52	GT	#044 Flying Lizard Motorsports	Seth Neiman	2:11.909	52
53	LMP2	#33 Level 5 Motorsports	Christophe Bouchut	2:23.917	53
54	LMPC	#018 Performance Tech Motorsports	No Time		54
55	GT	#008 West Yokohama Racing	No Time		55
56	GTC	#030 NGT Motorsports	No Time		56

== Race ==
=== Race result ===
Class winners in bold. Cars failing to complete 70% of winner's distance marked as Not Classified (NC).

Pos	Class	No	Team	Drivers	Chassis	Tire	Laps
Pos	Class	No	Team	Drivers	Engine	Tire	Laps
1	**LMP1**	**10**	**(France) Team Oreca-Matmut**	**(France) Nicolas Lapierre (France) Loïc Duval (France) Olivier Panis**	**Peugeot 908 HDi FAP**	MI	**332**
1	**LMP1**	**10**	**(France) Team Oreca-Matmut**	**(France) Nicolas Lapierre (France) Loïc Duval (France) Olivier Panis**	**Peugeot HDi 5.5 L Turbo V12 (Diesel)**	MI	**332**
2	LMP1	01	(United States) Highcroft Racing	(Australia) David Brabham (United Kingdom) Marino Franchitti (France) Simon Pagenaud	HPD ARX-01e	MI	332
2	LMP1	01	(United States) Highcroft Racing	(Australia) David Brabham (United Kingdom) Marino Franchitti (France) Simon Pagenaud	HPD AL7R 3.4 L V8	MI	332
3	LMP1	8	(France) Peugeot Sport Total	(Portugal) Pedro Lamy (France) Franck Montagny (France) Stéphane Sarrazin	Peugeot 908	MI	332
3	LMP1	8	(France) Peugeot Sport Total	(Portugal) Pedro Lamy (France) Franck Montagny (France) Stéphane Sarrazin	Peugeot HDi 3.7 L Turbo V8 (Diesel)	MI	332
4	LMP1	2	(Germany) Audi Sport Team Joest	(Denmark) Tom Kristensen (United Kingdom) Allan McNish (Italy) Rinaldo Capello	Audi R15 TDI plus	MI	327
4	LMP1	2	(Germany) Audi Sport Team Joest	(Denmark) Tom Kristensen (United Kingdom) Allan McNish (Italy) Rinaldo Capello	Audi TDI 5.5 L Turbo V10 (Diesel)	MI	327
5	LMP1	1	(Germany) Audi Sport Team Joest	(Germany) Timo Bernhard (Germany) Mike Rockenfeller (France) Romain Dumas	Audi R15 TDI plus	MI	326
5	LMP1	1	(Germany) Audi Sport Team Joest	(Germany) Timo Bernhard (Germany) Mike Rockenfeller (France) Romain Dumas	Audi TDI 5.5 L Turbo V10 (Diesel)	MI	326
6	LMP1	016	(United States) Dyson Racing Team	(United States) Chris Dyson (United Kingdom) Guy Smith (United States) Jay Cochran	Lola B09/86	D	324
6	LMP1	016	(United States) Dyson Racing Team	(United States) Chris Dyson (United Kingdom) Guy Smith (United States) Jay Cochran	Mazda MZR-R 2.0 L Turbo I4 (Isobutanol)	D	324
7	LMP1	12	(Switzerland) Rebellion Racing	(Switzerland) Neel Jani (France) Nicolas Prost (Netherlands) Jeroen Bleekemolen	Lola B10/60	MI	320
7	LMP1	12	(Switzerland) Rebellion Racing	(Switzerland) Neel Jani (France) Nicolas Prost (Netherlands) Jeroen Bleekemolen	Toyota RV8KLM 3.4 L V8	MI	320
8	LMP1	7	(France) Peugeot Sport Total	(Austria) Alexander Wurz (United Kingdom) Anthony Davidson (Spain) Marc Gené	Peugeot 908	MI	315
8	LMP1	7	(France) Peugeot Sport Total	(Austria) Alexander Wurz (United Kingdom) Anthony Davidson (Spain) Marc Gené	Peugeot HDi 3.7 L Turbo V8 (Diesel)	MI	315
9	**LMPC**	**036**	**(United States) Genoa Racing**	**(Germany) Jens Petersen (United States) Dane Cameron (United States) Michael Guasch**	**Oreca FLM09**	MI	**312**
9	**LMPC**	**036**	**(United States) Genoa Racing**	**(Germany) Jens Petersen (United States) Dane Cameron (United States) Michael Guasch**	**Chevrolet LS3 6.2 L V8**	MI	**312**
10	**GT**	**56**	**(Germany) BMW Motorsport**	**(Germany) Dirk Müller (United States) Joey Hand (United Kingdom) Andy Priaulx**	**BMW M3 GT2**	D	**312**
10	**GT**	**56**	**(Germany) BMW Motorsport**	**(Germany) Dirk Müller (United States) Joey Hand (United Kingdom) Andy Priaulx**	**BMW 4.0 L V8**	D	**312**
11	LMPC	005	(United States) CORE Autosport	(United States) Jon Bennett (United States) Frankie Montecalvo (United Kingdom) Ryan Dalziel	Oreca FLM09	MI	312
11	LMPC	005	(United States) CORE Autosport	(United States) Jon Bennett (United States) Frankie Montecalvo (United Kingdom) Ryan Dalziel	Chevrolet LS3 6.2 L V8	MI	312
12	GT	55	(Germany) BMW Motorsport	(United States) Bill Auberlen (Germany) Dirk Werner (Brazil) Augusto Farfus	BMW M3 GT2	D	312
12	GT	55	(Germany) BMW Motorsport	(United States) Bill Auberlen (Germany) Dirk Werner (Brazil) Augusto Farfus	BMW 4.0 L V8	D	312
13	GT	03	(United States) Corvette Racing	(United States) Tommy Milner (Monaco) Olivier Beretta (Spain) Antonio García	Chevrolet Corvette C6.R	MI	312
13	GT	03	(United States) Corvette Racing	(United States) Tommy Milner (Monaco) Olivier Beretta (Spain) Antonio García	Chevrolet 5.5 L V8	MI	312
14	GT	04	(United States) Corvette Racing	(United Kingdom) Oliver Gavin (Denmark) Jan Magnussen (United Kingdom) Richard Westbrook	Chevrolet Corvette C6.R	MI	311
14	GT	04	(United States) Corvette Racing	(United Kingdom) Oliver Gavin (Denmark) Jan Magnussen (United Kingdom) Richard Westbrook	Chevrolet 5.5 L V8	MI	311
15	GT	51	(Italy) AF Corse	(Italy) Giancarlo Fisichella (Italy) Gianmaria Bruni (Germany) Pierre Kaffer	Ferrari F430 GT2	MI	311
15	GT	51	(Italy) AF Corse	(Italy) Giancarlo Fisichella (Italy) Gianmaria Bruni (Germany) Pierre Kaffer	Ferrari 4.0 L V8	MI	311
16	GT	045	(United States) Flying Lizard Motorsports	(United States) Patrick Long (Germany) Jörg Bergmeister (Germany) Marc Lieb	Porsche 997 GT3-RSR	MI	310
16	GT	045	(United States) Flying Lizard Motorsports	(United States) Patrick Long (Germany) Jörg Bergmeister (Germany) Marc Lieb	Porsche 4.0 L Flat-6	MI	310
17	GT	044	(United States) Flying Lizard Motorsports	(United States) Seth Neiman (United States) Darren Law (Germany) Marco Holzer	Porsche 997 GT3-RSR	MI	306
17	GT	044	(United States) Flying Lizard Motorsports	(United States) Seth Neiman (United States) Darren Law (Germany) Marco Holzer	Porsche 4.0 L Flat-6	MI	306
18	LMPC	006	(United States) CORE Autosport	(United States) Gunnar Jeannette (Mexico) Ricardo González (Mexico) Rudy Junco, Jr.	Oreca FLM09	MI	305
18	LMPC	006	(United States) CORE Autosport	(United States) Gunnar Jeannette (Mexico) Ricardo González (Mexico) Rudy Junco, Jr.	Chevrolet LS3 6.2 L V8	MI	305
19	**GTE; Am**	**57**	**(United States) Krohn Racing**	**(United States) Tracy Krohn (Sweden) Niclas Jönsson (Italy) Michele Rugolo**	**Ferrari F430 GT2**	D	**302**
19	**GTE; Am**	**57**	**(United States) Krohn Racing**	**(United States) Tracy Krohn (Sweden) Niclas Jönsson (Italy) Michele Rugolo**	**Ferrari 4.0 V8**	D	**302**
20	**LMP2**	**055**	**(United States) Level 5 Motorsports**	**(United States) Ryan Hunter-Reay (Mexico) Luis Díaz**	**Lola B11/40**	MI	**300**
20	**LMP2**	**055**	**(United States) Level 5 Motorsports**	**(United States) Ryan Hunter-Reay (Mexico) Luis Díaz**	**HPD HR28TT 2.8 L Turbo V6**	MI	**300**
21	**GTC**	**054**	**(United States) Black Swan Racing**	**(United States) Tim Pappas (Republic of Ireland) Damien Faulkner (Netherlands) Sebastiaan Bleekemolen**	**Porsche 997 GT3 Cup**	Y	**299**
21	**GTC**	**054**	**(United States) Black Swan Racing**	**(United States) Tim Pappas (Republic of Ireland) Damien Faulkner (Netherlands) Sebastiaan Bleekemolen**	**Porsche 3.8 L Flat-6**	Y	**299**
22	GTC	066	(United States) TRG	(United States) Duncan Ende (United States) Spencer Pumpelly (Hong Kong) Alain Li	Porsche 997 GT3 Cup	Y	299
22	GTC	066	(United States) TRG	(United States) Duncan Ende (United States) Spencer Pumpelly (Hong Kong) Alain Li	Porsche 3.8 L Flat-6	Y	299
23	GTC	030	(United States) NGT Motorsports	(United States) Henrique Cisneros (United States) Carlos Kauffmann (United Kingdom) Sean Edwards	Porsche 997 GT3 Cup	Y	296
23	GTC	030	(United States) NGT Motorsports	(United States) Henrique Cisneros (United States) Carlos Kauffmann (United Kingdom) Sean Edwards	Porsche 3.8 L Flat-6	Y	296
24	GTC	011	(United States) JDX Racing	(United States) Nick Ham (Canada) Chris Cumming (United States) Scott Blackett	Porsche 997 GT3 Cup	Y	295
24	GTC	011	(United States) JDX Racing	(United States) Nick Ham (Canada) Chris Cumming (United States) Scott Blackett	Porsche 3.8 L Flat-6	Y	295
25	GTC	068	(United States) TRG	(South Africa) Dion von Moltke (United States) Peter Ludwig (United States) Jim Norman	Porsche 997 GT3 Cup	Y	295
25	GTC	068	(United States) TRG	(South Africa) Dion von Moltke (United States) Peter Ludwig (United States) Jim Norman	Porsche 3.8 L Flat-6	Y	295
26	GT	040	(United States) Robertson Racing	(United States) David Robertson (United States) Andrea Robertson (United States) Boris Said	Ford GT-R Mk. VII	MI	294
26	GT	040	(United States) Robertson Racing	(United States) David Robertson (United States) Andrea Robertson (United States) Boris Said	Élan 5.0 L V8	MI	294
27	LMPC	063	(United States) Genoa Racing	(Ecuador) Elton Julian (United States) Eric Lux (Germany) Christian Zugel	Oreca FLM09	MI	294
27	LMPC	063	(United States) Genoa Racing	(Ecuador) Elton Julian (United States) Eric Lux (Germany) Christian Zugel	Chevrolet LS3 6.2 L V8	MI	294
28	GT	59	(France) Luxury Racing	(Monaco) Stéphane Ortelli (France) Frédéric Makowiecki (Switzerland) Jean-Denis Délétraz	Ferrari 458 Italia GT2	MI	292
28	GT	59	(France) Luxury Racing	(Monaco) Stéphane Ortelli (France) Frédéric Makowiecki (Switzerland) Jean-Denis Délétraz	Ferrari 4.5 L V8	MI	292
29	GTC	034	(United States) Kelly-Moss Motorsports	(United States) Peter LeSaffre (United States) Andrew Davis (United States) Bob Faieta	Porsche 997 GT3 Cup	Y	291
29	GTC	034	(United States) Kelly-Moss Motorsports	(United States) Peter LeSaffre (United States) Andrew Davis (United States) Bob Faieta	Porsche 3.8 L Flat-6	Y	291
30	LMP2	26	(France) Signatech Nissan	(France) Franck Mailleux (France) Soheil Ayari (Spain) Lucas Ordoñez	Oreca 03	D	290
30	LMP2	26	(France) Signatech Nissan	(France) Franck Mailleux (France) Soheil Ayari (Spain) Lucas Ordoñez	Nissan VK45DE 4.5 L V8	D	290
31	LMP2	35	(France) OAK Racing	(France) Patrice Lafargue (France) Frédéric Da Rocha (Italy) Andrea Barlesi	OAK Pescarolo 01	D	287
31	LMP2	35	(France) OAK Racing	(France) Patrice Lafargue (France) Frédéric Da Rocha (Italy) Andrea Barlesi	Judd–BMW HK 3.6 L V8	D	287
32	GTC	077	(United States) Magnus Racing	(United States) John Potter (United States) Craig Stanton (Hong Kong) Matthew Marsh	Porsche 997 GT3 Cup	Y	282
32	GTC	077	(United States) Magnus Racing	(United States) John Potter (United States) Craig Stanton (Hong Kong) Matthew Marsh	Porsche 3.8 L Flat-6	Y	282
33	LMP2	33	(United States) Level 5 Motorsports	(United States) Scott Tucker (France) Christophe Bouchut (Portugal) João Barbosa	Lola B08/80	MI	280
33	LMP2	33	(United States) Level 5 Motorsports	(United States) Scott Tucker (France) Christophe Bouchut (Portugal) João Barbosa	HPD HR28TT 2.8 L Turbo V6	MI	280
34	GTC	023	(United States) Alex Job Racing	(United States) Leh Keen (United States) Bill Sweedler (United States) Brian Wong	Porsche 997 GT3 Cup	Y	279
34	GTC	023	(United States) Alex Job Racing	(United States) Leh Keen (United States) Bill Sweedler (United States) Brian Wong	Porsche 3.8 L Flat-6	Y	279
35 DNF	GT	002	(United States) Extreme Speed Motorsports	(United States) Ed Brown (United States) Guy Cosmo (United Kingdom) Rob Bell	Ferrari 458 Italia GT2	MI	268
35 DNF	GT	002	(United States) Extreme Speed Motorsports	(United States) Ed Brown (United States) Guy Cosmo (United Kingdom) Rob Bell	Ferrari 4.5 L V8	MI	268
36 DNF	GT	062	(United States) Risi Competizione	(Brazil) Jaime Melo (Finland) Toni Vilander (Finland) Mika Salo	Ferrari 458 Italia GT2	MI	266
36 DNF	GT	062	(United States) Risi Competizione	(Brazil) Jaime Melo (Finland) Toni Vilander (Finland) Mika Salo	Ferrari 4.5 L V8	MI	266
37 DNF	GT	004	(United States) Robertson Racing	(United States) David Murry (United States) Anthony Lazzaro (United States) Colin Braun	Ford GT-R Mk. VII	MI	261
37 DNF	GT	004	(United States) Robertson Racing	(United States) David Murry (United States) Anthony Lazzaro (United States) Colin Braun	Élan 5.0 L V8	MI	261
38	GT	098	(United States) Jaguar RSR	(United States) P. J. Jones (United States) Rocky Moran (Canada) Kenny Wilden	Jaguar XKR GT2	D	256
38	GT	098	(United States) Jaguar RSR	(United States) P. J. Jones (United States) Rocky Moran (Canada) Kenny Wilden	Jaguar 5.0 L V8	D	256
39	GTE; Am	63	(Germany) Proton Competition	(Austria) Richard Lietz (Germany) Christian Ried (Italy) Gianluca Roda	Porsche 997 GT3-RSR	MI	252
39	GTE; Am	63	(Germany) Proton Competition	(Austria) Richard Lietz (Germany) Christian Ried (Italy) Gianluca Roda	Porsche 4.0 L Flat-6	MI	252
40	LMPC	018	(United States) Performance Tech Motorsports	(United States) Anthony Nicolosi (United States) Jarrett Boon (Germany) Jan-Dirk Lueders	Oreca FLM09	MI	246
40	LMPC	018	(United States) Performance Tech Motorsports	(United States) Anthony Nicolosi (United States) Jarrett Boon (Germany) Jan-Dirk Lueders	Chevrolet LS3 6.2 L V8	MI	246
41 DNF	GT	048	(United States) Paul Miller Racing	(United States) Bryce Miller (Germany) René Rast (Germany) Sascha Maassen	Porsche 997 GT3-RSR	Y	231
41 DNF	GT	048	(United States) Paul Miller Racing	(United States) Bryce Miller (Germany) René Rast (Germany) Sascha Maassen	Porsche 4.0 L Flat-6	Y	231
42 DNF	GTE; Am	62	(United Kingdom) CRS Racing	(Germany) Pierre Ehret (United Kingdom) Shaun Lynn (New Zealand) Roger Willis	Ferrari F430 GT2	MI	226
42 DNF	GTE; Am	62	(United Kingdom) CRS Racing	(Germany) Pierre Ehret (United Kingdom) Shaun Lynn (New Zealand) Roger Willis	Ferrari 4.0 V8	MI	226
43 DNF	LMP1	15	(France) OAK Racing	(France) Matthieu Lahaye (France) Pierre Ragues (France) Guillaume Moreau	OAK Pescarolo 01	D	222
43 DNF	LMP1	15	(France) OAK Racing	(France) Matthieu Lahaye (France) Pierre Ragues (France) Guillaume Moreau	Judd DB 3.4 L V8	D	222
44 DNF	GT	017	(United States) Team Falken Tire	(United States) Bryan Sellers (Germany) Wolf Henzler (Austria) Martin Ragginger	Porsche 997 GT3-RSR	FAL	220
44 DNF	GT	017	(United States) Team Falken Tire	(United States) Bryan Sellers (Germany) Wolf Henzler (Austria) Martin Ragginger	Porsche 4.0 L Flat-6	FAL	220
45 DNF	LMPC	038	(United Kingdom) Iconik Energy Drinks WRO	(France) Olivier Lombard (United Kingdom) Johnny Mowlem (Italy) Luca Moro	Oreca FLM09	MI	203
45 DNF	LMPC	038	(United Kingdom) Iconik Energy Drinks WRO	(France) Olivier Lombard (United Kingdom) Johnny Mowlem (Italy) Luca Moro	Chevrolet LS3 6.2 L V8	MI	203
46 DNF	LMPC	052	(United States) PR1 Mathiasen Motorsports	(United States) Ken Dobson (United Kingdom) Ryan Lewis (France) Henri Richard	Oreca FLM09	MI	185
46 DNF	LMPC	052	(United States) PR1 Mathiasen Motorsports	(United States) Ken Dobson (United Kingdom) Ryan Lewis (France) Henri Richard	Chevrolet LS3 6.2 L V8	MI	185
47 DNF	LMP1	06	(United States) Muscle Milk Aston Martin Racing	(United States) Greg Pickett (Germany) Klaus Graf (Germany) Lucas Luhr	Lola-Aston Martin B08/62	MI	151
47 DNF	LMP1	06	(United States) Muscle Milk Aston Martin Racing	(United States) Greg Pickett (Germany) Klaus Graf (Germany) Lucas Luhr	Aston Martin 6.0 L V12	MI	151
48 DNF	LMP1	24	(France) OAK Racing	(France) Jacques Nicolet (France) Jean-François Yvon (Monaco) Richard Hein	OAK Pescarolo 01	D	110
48 DNF	LMP1	24	(France) OAK Racing	(France) Jacques Nicolet (France) Jean-François Yvon (Monaco) Richard Hein	Judd DB 3.4 L V8	D	110
49 DNF	GTC	032	(United States) GMG Racing	(United States) Bret Curtis (United States) James Sofronas (Germany) Jan Seyffarth	Porsche 997 GT3 Cup	Y	87
49 DNF	GTC	032	(United States) GMG Racing	(United States) Bret Curtis (United States) James Sofronas (Germany) Jan Seyffarth	Porsche 3.8 L Flat-6	Y	87
50 DNF	LMPC	089	(United States) Intersport Racing	(Canada) Kyle Marcelli (United States) Tomy Drissi (United States) Rusty Mitchell	Oreca FLM09	MI	85
50 DNF	LMPC	089	(United States) Intersport Racing	(Canada) Kyle Marcelli (United States) Tomy Drissi (United States) Rusty Mitchell	Chevrolet LS3 6.2 L V8	MI	85
51 DNF	GT	001	(United States) Extreme Speed Motorsports	(United States) Scott Sharp (United States) Johannes van Overbeek (Germany) Dominik Farnbacher	Ferrari 458 Italia GT2	MI	49
51 DNF	GT	001	(United States) Extreme Speed Motorsports	(United States) Scott Sharp (United States) Johannes van Overbeek (Germany) Dominik Farnbacher	Ferrari 4.5 L V8	MI	49
52 DNF	GTE; Am	50	(France) Larbre Compétition	(France) Patrick Bornhauser (France) Julien Canal (Switzerland) Gabriele Gardel	Chevrolet Corvette C6.R	MI	37
52 DNF	GTE; Am	50	(France) Larbre Compétition	(France) Patrick Bornhauser (France) Julien Canal (Switzerland) Gabriele Gardel	Chevrolet 5.5 L V8	MI	37
53 DNF	GT	099	(United States) Jaguar RSR	(Brazil) Bruno Junqueira (Brazil) Cristiano da Matta (Spain) Oriol Servià	Jaguar XKR GT2	D	35
53 DNF	GT	099	(United States) Jaguar RSR	(Brazil) Bruno Junqueira (Brazil) Cristiano da Matta (Spain) Oriol Servià	Jaguar 5.0 L V8	D	35
54 DNF	GT	050	(United States) Panoz Racing	(Switzerland) Benjamin Leuenberger (United Kingdom) Ian James	Panoz Abruzzi	MI	19
54 DNF	GT	050	(United States) Panoz Racing	(Switzerland) Benjamin Leuenberger (United Kingdom) Ian James	Chevrolet 6.5 L V8	MI	19
55 DNF	GT	008	(United States) West Yokohama Team	(Netherlands) Nicky Pastorelli (Germany) Dominik Schwager	Lamborghini Gallardo LP560 GT2	Y	10
55 DNF	GT	008	(United States) West Yokohama Team	(Netherlands) Nicky Pastorelli (Germany) Dominik Schwager	Lamborghini 5.2 L V10	Y	10
56 DNF	GTE; Am	60	(United Arab Emirates) Gulf AMR Middle East	(France) Fabien Giroix (Germany) Roald Goethe (United Kingdom) Michael Wainwright	Aston Martin V8 Vantage GT2	D	5
56 DNF	GTE; Am	60	(United Arab Emirates) Gulf AMR Middle East	(France) Fabien Giroix (Germany) Roald Goethe (United Kingdom) Michael Wainwright	Aston Martin 4.5 L V8	D	5

American Le Mans Series
Previous race: None	2011 season	Next race: American Le Mans Series at Long Beach
