= 2023 24 Hours of Spa =

76th 24 Hours of Spa endurance race

(Belgium) 2023 24 Hours of Spa
Event Information
- Round 3 of 5 in the 2023 GT World Challenge Europe Endurance Cup
- Date: 29 June–2 July 2023 GT World Challenge Europe Endurance Cup
- Location: Spa-Francorchamps, Wallonia, Belgium
- Venue: Circuit de Spa-Francorchamps

Results
Race 1
Distance	537 laps	3,761.14 km
Pole position	(Hong Kong) Antares Au (Italy) Matteo Cairoli (Germany) Jannes Fittje (Germany) Tim Heinemann (Germany) Huber Motorsport	2:16.880
Winner	(Austria) Philipp Eng (Germany) Marco Wittmann (United Kingdom) Nick Yelloly (Germany) ROWE Racing	

The 2023 24 Hours of Spa (also known as the CrowdStrike 24 Hours of Spa) was the 76th running of the 24 Hours of Spa. The race took place from June 29 to July 2, 2023. The race was a part of both the 2023 GT World Challenge Europe Endurance Cup and the 2023 Intercontinental GT Challenge.

== Background ==
In September 2022, the 2023 Belgian Grand Prix Formula One race was scheduled to be held on July 28-30, which clashed with the traditional date of the Spa 24 Hours, so the latter was forced to be rescheduled to early July.

Supporting the race weekend were the McLaren Trophy Europe, Lamborghini Super Trofeo, Formula Regional European Championship, GT4 European Series and GT1 Sports Club.

During the Saturday morning support race featuring the Formula Regional European Championship, a crash on Lap 9, the penultimate lap of the 30-minute plus one lap race, German driver Tim Tramnitz crashed on the restart exiting Radillon, on the Kemmel Straight. Dutch driver Dilano van't Hoff then collided with a barrier. Without visibility at the circuit, Irish driver Adam Fitzgerald then crashed into the side of the van't Hoff's vehicle, causing it to tear in half. Van't Hoff was rushed to the hospital, where he was pronounced dead.

== Entry list ==
A 70-car field contested the race — 20 in Pro class, 7 in Gold Cup, 10 in Silver Cup, 21 in Bronze Cup and 12 in Pro-Am Cup. 8 manufacturers were represented, with 15 Mercedes cars, 14 Porsche cars, 13 Audi cars, 10 Lamborghini cars, 7 BMW cars, 5 Ferrari cars (4 Ferrari 296 GT3 and 1 Ferrari 488 GT3 Evo 2020), 5 McLaren cars and 1 Aston Martin car. Compared to the previous edition of the race, Porsche and Ferrari introduced brand-new models, while Lamborghini and McLaren provided the teams with updated kits.

No.	Entrant	Car	Driver 1	Driver 2	Driver 3	Driver 4
Pro (20 entries)
6	(United States) K-Pax Racing	Lamborghini Huracán GT3 Evo2	(Italy) Marco Mapelli	(United Kingdom) Sandy Mitchell	(France) Franck Perera	
11	(Belgium) Audi Sport Team Comtoyou	Audi R8 LMS Evo II	(Germany) Christopher Haase	(Belgium) Gilles Magnus	(Belgium) Frédéric Vervisch	
17	(Germany) Scherer Sport PHX	Audi R8 LMS Evo II	(Germany) Luca Engstler	(South Africa) Kelvin van der Linde	(Denmark) Nicki Thiim	
25	(France) Audi Sport Team Saintéloc	Audi R8 LMS Evo II	(France) Simon Gachet	(Germany) Christopher Mies	(Switzerland) Patric Niederhauser	
32	(Belgium) Team WRT	BMW M4 GT3	(South Africa) Sheldon van der Linde	(Belgium) Dries Vanthoor	(Belgium) Charles Weerts	
40	(Germany) Audi Sport Tresor Orange1	Audi R8 LMS Evo II	(San Marino) Mattia Drudi (Note: Drudi is an Italian driver competing under a Sammarinese licence.)	(Switzerland) Ricardo Feller	(Germany) Dennis Marschall	
46	(Belgium) Team WRT	BMW M4 GT3	(Brazil) Augusto Farfus	(Belgium) Maxime Martin	(Italy) Valentino Rossi	
51	(Italy) AF Corse - Francorchamps Motors	Ferrari 296 GT3	(Denmark) Nicklas Nielsen	(Italy) Alessio Rovera	(Israel) Robert Shwartzman (Note: Boguslavskiy, Mukovoz and Nesov are Russian, but they compete as neutral competitors as Russian national emblems were banned by the FIA following the Russian invasion of Ukraine. Shwartzman and Petrov, also Russians, compete under an Israeli licence for the same reason.)	
54	(Italy) Dinamic GT Huber Racing	Porsche 911 GT3 R (992)	(Germany) Christian Engelhart	(Turkey) Ayhancan Güven	(Germany) Sven Müller	
63	(Italy) Iron Lynx	Lamborghini Huracán GT3 Evo2	(Italy) Mirko Bortolotti	(Italy) Andrea Caldarelli	(South Africa) Jordan Pepper	
71	(Italy) AF Corse - Francorchamps Motors	Ferrari 296 GT3	(Italy) Antonio Fuoco	(Italy) Davide Rigon	(Brazil) Daniel Serra	
87	(France) Mercedes-AMG Team AKKodis ASP	Mercedes-AMG GT3 Evo	(France) Thomas Drouet	(Italy) Lorenzo Ferrari	(Germany) Maximilian Götz	
88	(France) AKKodis ASP Team	Mercedes-AMG GT3 Evo	Timur Boguslavskiy	(Andorra) Jules Gounon	(Switzerland) Raffaele Marciello	
92	(Germany) Manthey EMA	Porsche 911 GT3 R (992)	(France) Julien Andlauer	(France) Kévin Estre	(Belgium) Laurens Vanthoor	
96	(Germany) Rutronik Racing	Porsche 911 GT3 R (992)	(Germany) Laurin Heinrich	(Norway) Dennis Olsen	(Austria) Thomas Preining	
98	(Germany) ROWE Racing	BMW M4 GT3	(Austria) Philipp Eng	(Germany) Marco Wittmann	(United Kingdom) Nick Yelloly	
159	(United Kingdom) Garage 59	McLaren 720S GT3 Evo	(Germany) Benjamin Goethe	(Germany) Marvin Kirchhöfer	(Denmark) Nicolai Kjærgaard	
777	(Oman) Mercedes-AMG Team AlManar	Mercedes-AMG GT3 Evo	(Austria) Lucas Auer	(Germany) Fabian Schiller	(Germany) Luca Stolz	
998	(Germany) ROWE Racing	BMW M4 GT3	(United Kingdom) Daniel Harper	(Germany) Max Hesse	(United States) Neil Verhagen	
999	(Hong Kong) Mercedes-AMG Team GruppeM Racing	Mercedes-AMG GT3 Evo	(Germany) Maro Engel	(Canada) Mikaël Grenier	(Spain) Daniel Juncadella	
Gold (7 entries)
5	(United Kingdom) Optimum Motorsport	McLaren 720S GT3 Evo	(United Kingdom) Sam De Haan	(United Kingdom) Charlie Fagg	(United Kingdom) Dean MacDonald	(United Kingdom) Tom Gamble
9	(Belgium) Boutsen VDS	Audi R8 LMS Evo II	(Italy) Alberto Di Folco	(France) Adam Eteki	(France) Thomas Laurent	(France) Aurélien Panis
19	(Italy) Iron Lynx	Lamborghini Huracán GT3 Evo2	(Italy) Michele Beretta	(Switzerland) Rolf Ineichen	(Italy) Leonardo Pulcini	
21	(Belgium) Comtoyou Racing	Audi R8 LMS Evo II	(Belgium) Nicolas Baert	(Austria) Max Hofer	(Belgium) Maxime Soulet	
30	(Belgium) Team WRT	BMW M4 GT3	(Germany) Niklas Krütten	(France) Jean-Baptiste Simmenauer	(Australia) Calan Williams	
57	(United States) Winward Racing	Mercedes-AMG GT3 Evo	(Netherlands) Indy Dontje	(Switzerland) Philip Ellis	(United States) Russell Ward	
157	(United States) Winward Racing	Mercedes-AMG GT3 Evo	(Switzerland) Miklas Born	(Germany) David Schumacher	(Germany) Marius Zug	
Silver (10 entries)
10	(Belgium) Boutsen VDS	Audi R8 LMS Evo II	(France) Loris Cabirou	(Italy) Andrea Cola	(France) César Gazeau	(Israel) Roee Meyuhas
12	(Belgium) Comtoyou Racing	Audi R8 LMS Evo II	(Belgium) Sam Dejonghe	(Netherlands) Loris Hezemans	(United Kingdom) Finlay Hutchison	(Switzerland) Lucas Légeret
26	(France) Saintéloc Junior Team	Audi R8 LMS Evo II	(France) Erwan Bastard	(France) Grégoire Demoustier	(France) Antoine Doquin	(France) Paul Evrard
33	(Spain) Bullitt Racing	Aston Martin Vantage AMR GT3	(Canada) Jeff Kingsley	(France) Romain Leroux	(Germany) Jacob Riegel	(Netherlands) Ruben del Sarte
56	(Italy) Dinamic GT Huber Racing	Porsche 911 GT3 R (992)	(Italy) Daniele Di Amato	(Belgium) Adrien de Leener	(Netherlands) Jop Rappange	(Thailand) Tanart Sathienthirakul
58	(Austria) GRT Grasser Racing Team	Lamborghini Huracán GT3 Evo2	(Australia) Ricky Capo	(Italy) Fabrizio Crestani	(United Kingdom) Sam Neary	(Austria) Gerhard Tweraser
60	(Italy) VSR	Lamborghini Huracán GT3 Evo2	(Mexico) Luis Michael Dörrbecker	(Belgium) Baptiste Moulin	(Norway) Marcus Påverud	(Israel) Artem Petrov
85	(Austria) GRT Grasser Racing Team	Lamborghini Huracán GT3 Evo2	(Netherlands) Glenn van Berlo	(Chile) Benjamín Hites	(Austria) Clemens Schmid	
90	(Spain) Madpanda Motorsport	Mercedes-AMG GT3 Evo	(Norway) Magnus Gustavsen	Alexey Nesov	(Argentina) Ezequiel Pérez Companc	(Finland) Jesse Salmenautio
99	(Germany) Tresor Orange1	Audi R8 LMS Evo II	(Germany) Alex Aka	(Italy) Pietro Delli Guanti	(Italy) Lorenzo Patrese	
Bronze (21 entries)
3	(Germany) GetSpeed	Mercedes-AMG GT3 Evo	(Germany) Patrick Assenheimer	(Germany) Kenneth Heyer	(Australia) Alex Peroni	(Germany) Florian Scholze
7	(United Kingdom) Inception Racing	McLaren 720S GT3 Evo	(United States) Brendan Iribe	(United Kingdom) Ollie Millroy	(Spain) Fran Rueda	(Denmark) Frederik Schandorff
8	(France) AGS Events	Lamborghini Huracán GT3 Evo2	(Switzerland) Antonin Borga	(Italy) Leonardo Gorini	(France) Nico Jamin	
20	(Germany) Huber Motorsport	Porsche 911 GT3 R (992)	(Hong Kong) Antares Au	(Italy) Matteo Cairoli	(Germany) Jannes Fittje	(Germany) Tim Heinemann
23	(Australia) Grove Racing	Porsche 911 GT3 R (992)	(New Zealand) Earl Bamber	(Australia) Brenton Grove	(Australia) Stephen Grove	(Australia) Anton de Pasquale
31	(Belgium) Team WRT (Note: The No. 31 Team WRT entry was reclassified from Bronze Cup to Pro during the race after Tim Whale withdrew due to back pain.)	BMW M4 GT3	(United Kingdom) Adam Carroll	(United Kingdom) Lewis Proctor	(United Kingdom) Tim Whale	
35	(Germany) Walkenhorst Motorsport	BMW M4 GT3	(Norway) Anders Buchardt	(United Kingdom) James Kell	(France) Thomas Neubauer	(United Kingdom) Bailey Voisin
44	(France) CLRT	Porsche 911 GT3 R (992)	(France) Hugo Chevalier	(France) Frédéric Makowiecki	(France) Clément Mateu	(France) Steven Palette
50	(Italy) AF Corse	Ferrari 296 GT3	(United Kingdom) Simon Mann	(Belgium) Ulysse de Pauw	(France) Julien Piguet	(Argentina) Nicolás Varrone
52	(Italy) AF Corse	Ferrari 488 GT3 Evo 2020	(Italy) Andrea Bertolini	(Belgium) Jef Machiels	(Belgium) Louis Machiels	(France) Lilou Wadoux
55	(Italy) Dinamic GT Huber Racing	Porsche 911 GT3 R (992)	(United Kingdom) Ben Barker	(Norway) Marius Nakken	(Austria) Philipp Sager	(Austria) Christopher Zöchling
62	(United Kingdom) Team Parker Racing	Porsche 911 GT3 R (992)	(United Kingdom) Kiern Jewiss	(Netherlands) Xavier Maassen	(United Kingdom) Andy Meyrick	(United Kingdom) Derek Pierce
66	(Germany) Tresor Attempto Racing	Audi R8 LMS Evo II	(Italy) Kikko Galbiati	(Singapore) Sean Hudspeth	Andrey Mukovoz	(Luxembourg) Dylan Pereira
79	(Germany) Haupt Racing Team	Mercedes-AMG GT3 Evo	(France) Sébastien Baud	(Germany) Hubert Haupt	(Australia) Jordan Love	(India) Arjun Maini
81	(Saudi Arabia) Theeba Motorsport	Mercedes-AMG GT3 Evo	(Estonia) Ralf Aron	(Saudi Arabia) Reema Juffali	(Switzerland) Yannick Mettler	(Switzerland) Alain Valente
83	(Italy) Iron Dames	Lamborghini Huracán GT3 Evo2	(Belgium) Sarah Bovy	(Switzerland) Rahel Frey	(Denmark) Michelle Gatting	(France) Doriane Pin
89	(France) AKKodis ASP Team	Mercedes-AMG GT3 Evo	(Brazil) Adalberto Baptista	(Brazil) Bruno Baptista	(Brazil) Rodrigo Baptista	(Brazil) Alan Hellmeister
91	(Germany) Herberth Motorsport	Porsche 911 GT3 R (992)	(Netherlands) Kay van Berlo	(Germany) Ralf Bohn	(Germany) Alfred Renauer	(Germany) Robert Renauer
93	(United Kingdom) Sky – Tempesta Racing	McLaren 720S GT3 Evo	(Italy) Eddie Cheever III	(United Kingdom) Chris Froggatt	(Hong Kong) Jonathan Hui	(Switzerland) Jeffrey Schmidt
188	(United Kingdom) Garage 59	McLaren 720S GT3 Evo	(Portugal) Henrique Chaves	(United States) Conrad Grunewald	(Monaco) Louis Prette	(Portugal) Miguel Ramos
911	(Lithuania) Pure Rxcing	Porsche 911 GT3 R (992)	(Austria) Klaus Bachler	(United Kingdom) Alex Malykhin (Note: Malykhin is Belarusian, but he competes under a British licence as Belarusian national emblems were banned by the FIA following the Russian invasion of Ukraine.)	(Germany) Marco Seefried	(Germany) Joel Sturm
Pro-Am (12 entries)
2	(Germany) GetSpeed	Mercedes-AMG GT3 Evo	(United States) Lance Bergstein	(Poland) Andrzej Lewandowski	(United Kingdom) Aaron Walker	(United Kingdom) Lewis Williamson
4	(United States) CrowdStrike Racing by Riley	Mercedes-AMG GT3 Evo	(United States) Colin Braun	(Brazil) Felipe Fraga	(United Kingdom) Ian James	(United States) George Kurtz
16	(China) Uno Racing Team	Audi R8 LMS Evo II	(Hong Kong) Adderly Fong	(China) Xiaole He	(China) Junlin Pan	(Hong Kong) "Rio" (Note: Also known as "Riokonig".)
24	(Germany) Car Collection Motorsport	Porsche 911 GT3 R (992)	(Switzerland) Alex Fontana	(Switzerland) Ivan Jacoma	(Switzerland) Nicolas Leutwiler	(Germany) Nico Menzel
38	(Germany) ST Racing with Rinaldi	Ferrari 296 GT3	(United States) Jon Miller	(Canada) Samantha Tan	(Spain) Isaac Tutumlu	(Germany) Leonard Weiss
64	(Germany) Haupt Racing Team	Mercedes-AMG GT3 Evo	(United Kingdom) Matt Bell	(United Kingdom) Frank Bird	(United Kingdom) James Cottingham	(United States) Naveen Rao
70	(Germany) CrowdStrike Racing by Leipert Motorsport	Lamborghini Huracán GT3 Evo2	(United States) Jean-Francois Brunot	(New Zealand) Brendon Leitch	(China) Kerong Li	(United States) Gerhard Watzinger
75	(United States) SunEnergy1 Racing	Mercedes-AMG GT3 Evo	(Netherlands) Nicky Catsburg	(Austria) Martin Konrad	(Australia) Chaz Mostert	(Germany) Adam Osieka (Note: Kenny Habul was scheduled to race for SunEnergy1 Racing, but withdrew following an accident in Thursday's pre-qualifying session. Liam Talbot was originally nominated as his replacement, but could not make it to Belgium in time. The seat was eventually taken by GetSpeed owner Adam Osieka.)
78	(United Kingdom) Barwell Motorsport	Lamborghini Huracán GT3 Evo2	(United Kingdom) Rob Collard	(Finland) Patrick Kujala	(Denmark) Dennis Lind	(United Arab Emirates) Bashar Mardini
132	(United States) GMG Racing by Car Collection Motorsport	Porsche 911 GT3 R (992)	(Netherlands) Jeroen Bleekemolen	(United States) Patrick Long	(United States) James Sofronas	(United States) Kyle Washington
216	(Hong Kong) Modena Motorsports	Porsche 911 GT3 R (992)	(Switzerland) Mathias Beche	(Canada) John Shen	(Denmark) Benny Simonsen	(Netherlands) Francis Tjia
888	(France) CSA Racing	Audi R8 LMS Evo II	(France) Erwin Creed	(Belgium) Jean Glorieux	(France) Arthur Rougier	(United Kingdom) Casper Stevenson

== Qualifying Results ==
=== Qualifying ===
Fastest times for each car are denoted in bold.
Pole positions in each class are denoted in bold.

Pos.	Class	No.	Team	Car	Overall Time	Time 1	Time 2	Time 3	Time 4
1	Bronze	911	(Lithuania) Pure Rxcing	Porsche 911 GT3 R (992)	2:28.569	**2:18.937**	2:21.486	2:36.778	2:37.078
2	Gold	5	(United Kingdom) Optimum Motorsport	McLaren 720S GT3 Evo	2:28.923	**2:20.971**	2:22.479	2:35.645	2:36.598
3	Bronze	20	(Germany) Huber Motorsport	Porsche 911 GT3 R (992)	2:28.923	**2:20.971**	2:22.479	2:35.645	2:36.598
4	Bronze	83	(Italy) Iron Dames	Lamborghini Huracán GT3 Evo2	2:29.829	**2:19.199**	2:24.568	2:38.727	2:36.822
5	Gold	9	(Belgium) Boutsen VDS	Audi R8 LMS Evo II	2:29.880	**2:18.543**	2:23.377	2:38.999	2:38.601
6	Bronze	44	(France) CLRT	Porsche 911 GT3 R (992)	2:30.323	**2:22.223**	2:23.684	2:37.244	2:38.143
7	Pro	92	(Germany) Manthey EMA	Porsche 911 GT3 R (992)	2:30.456		**2:20.441**	2:35.746	2:35.182
8	Bronze	91	(Germany) Herberth Motorsport	Porsche 911 GT3 R (992)	2:30.497	**2:21.019**	2:24.781	2:38.371	2:37.819
9	Pro	999	(Hong Kong) Mercedes-AMG Team GruppeM Racing	Mercedes-AMG GT3 Evo	2:30.677		**2:20.684**	2:36.058	2:35.291
10	Pro	40	(Germany) Audi Sport Tresor Orange1	Audi R8 LMS Evo II	2:30.773		**2:20.509**	2:36.117	2:35.694
11	Pro-Am	78	(United Kingdom) Barwell Motorsport	Lamborghini Huracán GT3 Evo2	2:30.853	**2:20.591**	2:28.241	2:39.171	2:35.409
12	Pro	51	(Italy) AF Corse - Francorchamps Motors	Ferrari 296 GT3	2:31.026		**2:23.095**	2:35.120	2:34.864
13	Silver	60	(Italy) VSR	Lamborghini Huracán GT3 Evo2	2:31.258	**2:20.457**	2:23.139	2:43.265	2:38.173
14	Pro	11	(Belgium) Audi Sport Team Comtoyou	Audi R8 LMS Evo II	2:31.351		**2:22.686**	2:36.381	2:34.987
15	Silver	12	(Belgium) Comtoyou Racing	Audi R8 LMS Evo II	2:31.444	2:25.045	**2:24.734**	2:38.536	2:37.463
16	Pro	17	(Germany) Scherer Sport PHX	Audi R8 LMS Evo II	2:31.451		**2:22.282**	2:37.334	2:34.739
17	Pro	6	(United States) K-Pax Racing	Lamborghini Huracán GT3 Evo2	2:31.463		**2:21.359**	2:37.173	2:35.858
18	Silver	58	(Austria) GRT Grasser Racing Team	Lamborghini Huracán GT3 Evo2	2:31.489	**2:18.487**	2:23.532	2:40.689	2:43.251
19	Bronze	79	(Germany) Haupt Racing Team	Mercedes-AMG GT3 Evo	2:31.496	**2:21.299**	2:27.353	2:38.698	2:38.634
20	Bronze	23	(Australia) Grove Racing	Porsche 911 GT3 R (992)	2:31.502	2:26.240	**2:24.981**	2:37.595	2:37.194
21	Pro	46	(Belgium) Team WRT	BMW M4 GT3	2:31.539		**2:22.110**	2:35.511	2:36.998
22	Pro	32	(Belgium) Team WRT	BMW M4 GT3	2:31.667		**2:22.677**	2:37.100	2:35.224
23	Pro	88	(France) AKKodis ASP Team	Mercedes-AMG GT3 Evo	2:31.691		2:22.011	2:38.021	2:35.042
24	Silver	10	(Belgium) Boutsen VDS	Audi R8 LMS Evo II	2:31.712	**2:19.109**	2:22.007	2:47.303	2:38.429
25	Pro	998	(Germany) ROWE Racing	BMW M4 GT3	2:31.922		**2:22.034**	2:37.243	2:36.491
26	Pro	98	(Germany) ROWE Racing	BMW M4 GT3	2:31.955		**2:22.824**	2:35.927	2:37.116
27	Pro	777	(Oman) Mercedes-AMG Team AlManar	Mercedes-AMG GT3 Evo	2:31.963		**2:24.347**	2:36.536	2:35.006
28	Bronze	188	(United Kingdom) Garage 59	McLaren 720S GT3 Evo	2:31.987	**2:21.035**	2:24.790	2:40.667	2:41.457
29	Pro	25	(France) Audi Sport Team Saintéloc	Audi R8 LMS Evo II	2:32.026		**2:21.585**	2:37.661	2:36.832
30	Pro	96	(Germany) Rutronik Racing	Porsche 911 GT3 R (992)	2:32.039		**2:22.011**	2:35.648	2:38.460
31	Bronze	62	(United Kingdom) Team Parker Racing	Porsche 911 GT3 R (992)	2:32.104	**2:24.613**	2:28.029	2:40.068	2:35.709
32	Gold	21	(Belgium) Comtoyou Racing	Audi R8 LMS Evo II	2:32.283		**2:23.411**	2:37.304	2:36.134
33	Bronze	50	(Italy) AF Corse	Ferrari 296 GT3	2:32.319	**2:23.912**	2:27.031	2:38.130	2:40.206
34	Bronze	52	(Italy) AF Corse	Ferrari 296 GT3	2:32.371	**2:19.549**	2:28.320	2:41.605	2:40.010
35	Pro-Am	24	(Germany) Car Collection Motorsport	Porsche 911 GT3 R (992)	2:32.405	**2:21.840**	2:34.230	2:36.777	2:36.773
36	Bronze	66	(Germany) Tresor Attempto Racing	Audi R8 LMS Evo II	2:32.482	**2:23.393**	2:25.895	2:43.350	2:37.290
37	Pro	54	(Italy) Dinamic GT Huber Racing	Porsche 911 GT3 R (992)	2:32.704		**2:22.139**	2:38.176	2:37.797
38	Pro	87	(France) Mercedes-AMG Team AKKodis ASP	Mercedes-AMG GT3 Evo	2:32.836		**2:23.648**	2:37.007	2:37.855
39	Pro-Am	2	(Germany) GetSpeed	Mercedes-AMG GT3 Evo	2:33.015	**2:22.957**	2:29.345	2:40.819	2:38.940
40	Pro-Am	38	(Germany) ST Racing with Rinaldi	Ferrari 296 GT3	2:33.098	2:22.438	2:26.654	2:40.474	2:42.828
41	Pro	159	(United Kingdom) Garage 59	McLaren 720S GT3 Evo	2:33.101		**2:21.532**	2:37.397	2:40.374
42	Bronze	89	(France) AKKodis ASP Team	Mercedes-AMG GT3 Evo	2:33.230	2:25.905	**2:25.257**	2:40.941	2:40.820
43	Gold	157	(United States) Winward Racing	Mercedes-AMG GT3 Evo	2:33.389		**2:25.705**	2:36.861	2:37.603
44	Pro-Am	64	(Germany) Haupt Racing Team	Mercedes-AMG GT3 Evo	2:33.390	2:25.868	**2:23.456**	2:37.207	2:47.030
45	Gold	30	(Belgium) Team WRT	BMW M4 GT3	2:33.491		**2:24.626**	2:38.451	2:37.398
46	Bronze	93	(United Kingdom) Sky – Tempesta Racing	McLaren 720S GT3 Evo	2:33.699	**2:20.397**	2:28.605	2:46.486	2:39.310
47	Pro	71	(Italy) AF Corse - Francorchamps Motors	Ferrari 296 GT3	2:33.935		**2:22.647**	2:38.313	2:40.846
48	Bronze	35	(Germany) Walkenhorst Motorsport	BMW M4 GT3	2:34.094	**2:20.133**	2:32.140	2:42.472	2:41.631
49	Silver	99	(Germany) Tresor Orange1	Audi R8 LMS Evo II	2:34.169		**2:24.249**	2:40.744	2:37.514
50	Silver	85	(Austria) GRT Grasser Racing Team	Lamborghini Huracán GT3 Evo2	2:34.277		**2:21.689**	2:42.353	2:38.791
51	Pro-Am	888	(France) CSA Racing	Audi R8 LMS Evo II	2:34.303	**2:23.164**	2:35.095	2:40.033	2:38.920
52	Gold	57	(United States) Winward Racing	Mercedes-AMG GT3 Evo	2:34.363		**2:24.727**	2:39.050	2:39.314
53	Bronze	81	(Saudi Arabia) Theeba Motorsport	Mercedes-AMG GT3 Evo	2:34.976	2:39.346	**2:21.763**	2:39.327	2:39.469
54	Gold	19	(Italy) Iron Lynx	Lamborghini Huracán GT3 Evo2	2:35.012		**2:23.708**	2:39.324	2:42.006
55	Bronze	55	(Italy) Dinamic GT Huber Racing	Porsche 911 GT3 R (992)	2:35.620	2:40.259	**2:23.380**	2:41.884	2:36.960
56	Silver	26	(France) Saintéloc Junior Team	Audi R8 LMS Evo II	2:36.355	**2:20.865**	2:35.768	2:45.411	2:43.379
57	Bronze	31	(Belgium) Team WRT	BMW M4 GT3	2:38.382		**2:36.114**	2:38.206	2:40.828
58	Silver	56	(Italy) Dinamic GT Huber Racing	Porsche 911 GT3 R (992)	2:38.436	2:38.958	**2:34.153**	2:41.423	2:39.212
59	Bronze	8	(France) AGS Events	Lamborghini Huracán GT3 Evo2	2:38.599		**2:37.336**	2:40.260	2:38.202
60	Silver	33	(Spain) Bullitt Racing	Aston Martin Vantage AMR GT3	2:39.329	2:42.171	**2:23.782**	2:39.623	2:51.742
61	Pro-Am	16	(China) Uno Racing Team	Audi R8 LMS Evo II	2:39.881	**2:24.278**	2:35.409	3:00.204	2:39.636
62	Pro	63	(Italy) Iron Lynx	Lamborghini Huracán GT3 Evo2	2:30.472		**2:23.144**		2:37.800
63	Bronze	3	(Germany) GetSpeed	Mercedes-AMG GT3 Evo	2:33.107	**2:21.197**	2:39.314	2:38.810	
64	Silver	90	(Spain) Madpanda Motorsport	Mercedes-AMG GT3 Evo	2:38.182		**2:28.045**	2:39.584	2:46.918
65	Pro-Am	70	(Germany) CrowdStrike Racing by Leipert Motorsport	Lamborghini Huracán GT3 Evo2	2:40.812	2:49.794	**2:37.822**	2:41.766	2:42.849
66	Pro-Am	4	(United States) CrowdStrike Racing by Riley	Mercedes-AMG GT3 Evo	2:30.050	**2:21.489**	2:38.612		
67	Pro-Am	216	(Hong Kong) Modena Motorsports	Porsche 911 GT3 R (992)	2:24.465	**2:24.465**			
68	Bronze	7	(United Kingdom) Inception Racing	McLaren 720S GT3 Evo	2:33.064		**2:33.064**		
69	Pro-Am	132	(United States) GMG Racing by Car Collection Motorsport	Porsche 911 GT3 R (992)	No Time				
70	Pro-Am	75	(United States) SunEnergy1 Racing	Mercedes-AMG GT3 Evo	DNQ/No Time				

=== Super Pole ===
Pole positions in each class are denoted in bold.

Pos.	Class	No.	Team	Driver	Car	Time	Gap
1	**Bronze**	**20**	**(Germany) Huber Motorsport**	**(Italy) Matteo Cairoli**	**Porsche 911 GT3 R (992)**	**2:16.880**	-
2	**Pro**	**51**	**(Italy) AF Corse - Francorchamps Motors**	**(Italy) Alessio Rovera**	**Ferrari 296 GT3**	**2:16.996**	**+0.116**
3	Bronze	911	(Lithuania) Pure Rxcing	(Austria) Klaus Bachler	Porsche 911 GT3 R (992)	2:17.232	+0.352
4	Pro	6	(United States) K-Pax Racing	(France) Franck Perera	Lamborghini Huracán GT3 Evo2	2:17.243	+0.363
5	**Gold**	**5**	**(United Kingdom) Optimum Motorsport**	**(United Kingdom) Dean MacDonald**	**McLaren 720S GT3 Evo**	**2:17.249**	**+0.369**
6	Pro	40	(Germany) Audi Sport Tresor Orange1	(Switzerland) Ricardo Feller	Audi R8 LMS Evo II	2:17.293	+0.413
7	**Silver**	**58**	**(Austria) GRT Grasser Racing Team**	**(Italy) Fabrizio Crestani**	**Lamborghini Huracán GT3 Evo2**	**2:17.365**	**+0.485**
8	Bronze	44	(France) CLRT	(France) Frédéric Makowiecki	Porsche 911 GT3 R (992)	2:17.399	+0.519
9	Pro	17	(Germany) Scherer Sport PHX	(South Africa) Kelvin van der Linde	Audi R8 LMS Evo II	2:17.496	+0.616
10	Gold	9	(Belgium) Boutsen VDS	(France) Aurélien Panis	Audi R8 LMS Evo II	2:17.530	+0.65
11	Silver	12	(Belgium) Comtoyou Racing	(Switzerland) Lucas Légeret	Audi R8 LMS Evo II	2:17.624	+0.744
12	Bronze	83	(Italy) Iron Dames	(France) Doriane Pin	Lamborghini Huracán GT3 Evo2	2:17.739	+0.859
13	Pro	11	(Belgium) Audi Sport Team Comtoyou	(Belgium) Frédéric Vervisch	Audi R8 LMS Evo II	2:17.784	+0.904
14	Pro	92	(Germany) Manthey EMA	(France) Julien Andlauer	Porsche 911 GT3 R (992)	2:17.791	+0.911
15	Bronze	91	(Germany) Herberth Motorsport	(Germany) Robert Renauer	Porsche 911 GT3 R (992)	2:17.835	+0.955
16	Pro	999	(Hong Kong) Mercedes-AMG Team GruppeM Racing	(Germany) Maro Engel	Mercedes-AMG GT3 Evo	2:17.941	+1.061
17	Bronze	23	(Australia) Grove Racing	(New Zealand) Earl Bamber	Porsche 911 GT3 R (992)	2:17.997	+1.117
18	Bronze	79	(Germany) Haupt Racing Team	(India) Arjun Maini	Mercedes-AMG GT3 Evo	2:18.330	+1.45
19	**Pro-Am**	**78**	**(United Kingdom) Barwell Motorsport**	**(Denmark) Dennis Lind**	**Lamborghini Huracán GT3 Evo2**	**2:18.388**	**+1.508**
20	Silver	60	(Italy) VSR	(Norway) Marcus Påverud	Lamborghini Huracán GT3 Evo2	2:19.359	+2.479

== Race results ==
Class winners denoted in bold and with ‡

Pos	Class	No.	Team	Drivers	Car	Laps	Time/Retired
Pos	Class	No.	Team	Drivers	Engine	Laps	Time/Retired
1	P	**98**	**(Germany) Rowe Racing**	**(Austria) Philipp Eng (Germany) Marco Wittmann (United Kingdom) Nick Yelloly**	**BMW M4 GT3**	**537**	**24:01:15.423‡**
1	P	**98**	**(Germany) Rowe Racing**	**(Austria) Philipp Eng (Germany) Marco Wittmann (United Kingdom) Nick Yelloly**	**BMW S58B30T0 3.0 L Twin-turbo I6**	**537**	**24:01:15.423‡**
2	P	88	(France) AKKodis ASP Team	Timur Boguslavskiy (Andorra) Jules Gounon (Switzerland) Raffaele Marciello	Mercedes-AMG GT3 Evo	537	+11.129
2	P	88	(France) AKKodis ASP Team	Timur Boguslavskiy (Andorra) Jules Gounon (Switzerland) Raffaele Marciello	Mercedes-Benz M159 6.2 L V8	537	+11.129
3	P	17	(Germany) Scherer Sport PHX	(Germany) Luca Engstler (South Africa) Kelvin van der Linde (Denmark) Nicki Thiim	Audi R8 LMS Evo II	537	+12.269
3	P	17	(Germany) Scherer Sport PHX	(Germany) Luca Engstler (South Africa) Kelvin van der Linde (Denmark) Nicki Thiim	Audi DAR 5.2 L V10	537	+12.269
4	P	92	(Germany) Manthey EMA	(France) Julien Andlauer (France) Kévin Estre (Belgium) Laurens Vanthoor	Porsche 911 GT3 R (992)	537	+13.175
4	P	92	(Germany) Manthey EMA	(France) Julien Andlauer (France) Kévin Estre (Belgium) Laurens Vanthoor	Porsche M97/80 4.2 L Flat-6	537	+13.175
5	P	96	(Germany) Rutronik Racing	(Germany) Laurin Heinrich (Norway) Dennis Olsen (Austria) Thomas Preining	Porsche 911 GT3 R (992)	537	+50.301
5	P	96	(Germany) Rutronik Racing	(Germany) Laurin Heinrich (Norway) Dennis Olsen (Austria) Thomas Preining	Porsche M97/80 4.2 L Flat-6	537	+50.301
6	P	46	(Belgium) Team WRT	(Brazil) Augusto Farfus (Belgium) Maxime Martin (Italy) Valentino Rossi	BMW M4 GT3	537	+1:25.074
6	P	46	(Belgium) Team WRT	(Brazil) Augusto Farfus (Belgium) Maxime Martin (Italy) Valentino Rossi	BMW S58B30T0 3.0 L Twin-turbo I6	537	+1:25.074
7	P	40	(Germany) Audi Sport Tresor Orange1	(San Marino) Mattia Drudi (Switzerland) Ricardo Feller (Germany) Dennis Marschall	Audi R8 LMS Evo II	537	+1:33.639
7	P	40	(Germany) Audi Sport Tresor Orange1	(San Marino) Mattia Drudi (Switzerland) Ricardo Feller (Germany) Dennis Marschall	Audi DAR 5.2 L V10	537	+1:33.639
8	P	11	(Belgium) Audi Sport Team Comtoyou	(Germany) Christopher Haase (Belgium) Gilles Magnus (Belgium) Frédéric Vervisch	Audi R8 LMS Evo II	537	+1:33.949
8	P	11	(Belgium) Audi Sport Team Comtoyou	(Germany) Christopher Haase (Belgium) Gilles Magnus (Belgium) Frédéric Vervisch	Audi DAR 5.2 L V10	537	+1:33.949
9	P	777	(Oman) Mercedes-AMG Team AlManar	(Austria) Lucas Auer (Germany) Fabian Schiller (Germany) Luca Stolz	Mercedes-AMG GT3 Evo	536	+1 Lap
9	P	777	(Oman) Mercedes-AMG Team AlManar	(Austria) Lucas Auer (Germany) Fabian Schiller (Germany) Luca Stolz	Mercedes-Benz M159 6.2 L V8	536	+1 Lap
10	G	**5**	**(United Kingdom) Optimum Motorsport**	**(United Kingdom) Sam De Haan (United Kingdom) Charlie Fagg (United Kingdom) Dean MacDonald (United Kingdom) Tom Gamble**	**McLaren 720S GT3 Evo**	**536**	**+1 Lap‡**
10	G	**5**	**(United Kingdom) Optimum Motorsport**	**(United Kingdom) Sam De Haan (United Kingdom) Charlie Fagg (United Kingdom) Dean MacDonald (United Kingdom) Tom Gamble**	**McLaren M840T 4.0 L Twin-turbo V8**	**536**	**+1 Lap‡**
11	P	71	(Italy) AF Corse - Francorchamps Motors	(Italy) Antonio Fuoco (Italy) Davide Rigon (Brazil) Daniel Serra	Ferrari 296 GT3	536	+1 Lap
11	P	71	(Italy) AF Corse - Francorchamps Motors	(Italy) Antonio Fuoco (Italy) Davide Rigon (Brazil) Daniel Serra	Ferrari F163 3.0 L Twin-turbo V6	536	+1 Lap
12	P	54	(Italy) Dinamic GT Huber Racing	(Germany) Christian Engelhart (Turkey) Ayhancan Güven (Germany) Sven Müller	Porsche 911 GT3 R (992)	535	+2 Laps
12	P	54	(Italy) Dinamic GT Huber Racing	(Germany) Christian Engelhart (Turkey) Ayhancan Güven (Germany) Sven Müller	Porsche M97/80 4.2 L Flat-6	535	+2 Laps
13	B	**20**	**(Germany) Huber Motorsport**	**(Hong Kong) Antares Au (Italy) Matteo Cairoli (Germany) Jannes Fittje (Germany) Tim Heinemann**	**Porsche 911 GT3 R (992)**	**535**	**+2 Laps‡**
13	B	**20**	**(Germany) Huber Motorsport**	**(Hong Kong) Antares Au (Italy) Matteo Cairoli (Germany) Jannes Fittje (Germany) Tim Heinemann**	**Porsche M97/80 4.2 L Flat-6**	**535**	**+2 Laps‡**
14	G	30	(Belgium) Team WRT	(Germany) Niklas Krütten (France) Jean-Baptiste Simmenauer (Australia) Calan Williams	BMW M4 GT3	535	+2 Laps
14	G	30	(Belgium) Team WRT	(Germany) Niklas Krütten (France) Jean-Baptiste Simmenauer (Australia) Calan Williams	BMW S58B30T0 3.0 L Twin-turbo I6	535	+2 Laps
15	B	911	(Lithuania) Pure Rxcing	(Austria) Klaus Bachler (United Kingdom) Alex Malykhin (Germany) Marco Seefried (Germany) Joel Sturm	Porsche 911 GT3 R (992)	535	+2 Laps
15	B	911	(Lithuania) Pure Rxcing	(Austria) Klaus Bachler (United Kingdom) Alex Malykhin (Germany) Marco Seefried (Germany) Joel Sturm	Porsche M97/80 4.2 L Flat-6	535	+2 Laps
16	P	25	(France) Audi Sport Team Saintéloc	(France) Simon Gachet (Germany) Christopher Mies (Switzerland) Patric Niederhauser	Audi R8 LMS Evo II	535	+2 Laps
16	P	25	(France) Audi Sport Team Saintéloc	(France) Simon Gachet (Germany) Christopher Mies (Switzerland) Patric Niederhauser	Audi DAR 5.2 L V10	535	+2 Laps
17	S	**85**	**(Austria) GRT Grasser Racing Team**	**(Netherlands) Glenn van Berlo (Chile) Benjamín Hites (Austria) Clemens Schmid**	**Lamborghini Huracán GT3 Evo2**	**534**	**+3 Laps‡**
17	S	**85**	**(Austria) GRT Grasser Racing Team**	**(Netherlands) Glenn van Berlo (Chile) Benjamín Hites (Austria) Clemens Schmid**	**Lamborghini DGF 5.2 L V10**	**534**	**+3 Laps‡**
18	B	93	(United Kingdom) Sky – Tempesta Racing	(Italy) Eddie Cheever III (United Kingdom) Chris Froggatt (Hong Kong) Jonathan Hui (Switzerland) Jeffrey Schmidt	McLaren 720S GT3 Evo	534	+3 Laps
18	B	93	(United Kingdom) Sky – Tempesta Racing	(Italy) Eddie Cheever III (United Kingdom) Chris Froggatt (Hong Kong) Jonathan Hui (Switzerland) Jeffrey Schmidt	McLaren M840T 4.0 L Twin-turbo V8	534	+3 Laps
19	S	12	(Belgium) Comtoyou Racing	(Belgium) Sam Dejonghe (Netherlands) Loris Hezemans (United Kingdom) Finlay Hutchison (Switzerland) Lucas Légeret	Audi R8 LMS Evo II	534	+3 Laps
19	S	12	(Belgium) Comtoyou Racing	(Belgium) Sam Dejonghe (Netherlands) Loris Hezemans (United Kingdom) Finlay Hutchison (Switzerland) Lucas Légeret	Audi DAR 5.2 L V10	534	+3 Laps
20	B	44	(France) CLRT	(France) Hugo Chevalier (France) Frédéric Makowiecki (France) Clément Mateu (France) Steven Palette	Porsche 911 GT3 R (992)	534	+3 Laps
20	B	44	(France) CLRT	(France) Hugo Chevalier (France) Frédéric Makowiecki (France) Clément Mateu (France) Steven Palette	Porsche M97/80 4.2 L Flat-6	534	+3 Laps
21	G	21	(Belgium) Comtoyou Racing	(Belgium) Nicolas Baert (Austria) Max Hofer (Belgium) Maxime Soulet	Audi R8 LMS Evo II	534	+3 Laps
21	G	21	(Belgium) Comtoyou Racing	(Belgium) Nicolas Baert (Austria) Max Hofer (Belgium) Maxime Soulet	Audi DAR 5.2 L V10	534	+3 Laps
22	PA	**75**	**(Australia) SunEnergy1 Racing**	**(Netherlands) Nicky Catsburg (Austria) Martin Konrad (Australia) Chaz Mostert (Germany) Adam Osieka**	**Mercedes-AMG GT3 Evo**	**533**	**+4 Laps‡**
22	PA	**75**	**(Australia) SunEnergy1 Racing**	**(Netherlands) Nicky Catsburg (Austria) Martin Konrad (Australia) Chaz Mostert (Germany) Adam Osieka**	**Mercedes-Benz M159 6.2 L V8**	**533**	**+4 Laps‡**
23	PA	24	(Germany) Car Collection Motorsport	(Switzerland) Alex Fontana (Switzerland) Ivan Jacoma (Switzerland) Nicolas Leutwiler (Germany) Nico Menzel	Porsche 911 GT3 R (992)	533	+4 Laps
23	PA	24	(Germany) Car Collection Motorsport	(Switzerland) Alex Fontana (Switzerland) Ivan Jacoma (Switzerland) Nicolas Leutwiler (Germany) Nico Menzel	Porsche M97/80 4.2 L Flat-6	533	+4 Laps
24	B	79	(Germany) Haupt Racing Team	(France) Sébastien Baud (Germany) Hubert Haupt (Australia) Jordan Love (India) Arjun Maini	Mercedes-AMG GT3 Evo	533	+4 Laps
24	B	79	(Germany) Haupt Racing Team	(France) Sébastien Baud (Germany) Hubert Haupt (Australia) Jordan Love (India) Arjun Maini	Mercedes-Benz M159 6.2 L V8	533	+4 Laps
25	P	31	(Belgium) Team WRT	(United Kingdom) Adam Carroll (United Kingdom) Lewis Proctor (United Kingdom) Tim Whale	BMW M4 GT3	532	+5 Laps
25	P	31	(Belgium) Team WRT	(United Kingdom) Adam Carroll (United Kingdom) Lewis Proctor (United Kingdom) Tim Whale	BMW S58B30T0 3.0 L Twin-turbo I6	532	+5 Laps
26	B	52	(Italy) AF Corse	(Italy) Andrea Bertolini (Belgium) Jef Machiels (Belgium) Louis Machiels (France) Lilou Wadoux	Ferrari 488 GT3 Evo 2020	532	+5 Laps
26	B	52	(Italy) AF Corse	(Italy) Andrea Bertolini (Belgium) Jef Machiels (Belgium) Louis Machiels (France) Lilou Wadoux	Ferrari F154CB 3.9 L Twin-turbo V8	532	+5 Laps
27	B	91	(Germany) Herberth Motorsport	(Netherlands) Kay van Berlo (Germany) Ralf Bohn (Germany) Alfred Renauer (Germany) Robert Renauer	Porsche 911 GT3 R (992)	532	+5 Laps
27	B	91	(Germany) Herberth Motorsport	(Netherlands) Kay van Berlo (Germany) Ralf Bohn (Germany) Alfred Renauer (Germany) Robert Renauer	Porsche M97/80 4.2 L Flat-6	532	+5 Laps
28	B	66	(Germany) Tresor Attempto Racing	(Italy) Kikko Galbiati (Singapore) Sean Hudspeth; Andrey Mukovoz (Luxembourg) Dylan Pereira	Audi R8 LMS Evo II	531	+6 Laps
28	B	66	(Germany) Tresor Attempto Racing	(Italy) Kikko Galbiati (Singapore) Sean Hudspeth; Andrey Mukovoz (Luxembourg) Dylan Pereira	Audi DAR 5.2 L V10	531	+6 Laps
29	P	6	(United States) K-Pax Racing	(Italy) Marco Mapelli (United Kingdom) Sandy Mitchell (France) Franck Perera	Lamborghini Huracán GT3 Evo2	530	+7 Laps
29	P	6	(United States) K-Pax Racing	(Italy) Marco Mapelli (United Kingdom) Sandy Mitchell (France) Franck Perera	Lamborghini DGF 5.2 L V10	530	+7 Laps
30	S	26	(France) Saintéloc Junior Team	(France) Erwan Bastard (France) Grégoire Demoustier (France) Antoine Doquin (France) Paul Evrard	Audi R8 LMS Evo II	529	+8 Laps
30	S	26	(France) Saintéloc Junior Team	(France) Erwan Bastard (France) Grégoire Demoustier (France) Antoine Doquin (France) Paul Evrard	Audi DAR 5.2 L V10	529	+8 Laps
31	S	56	(Italy) Dinamic GT Huber Racing	(Italy) Daniele Di Amato (Belgium) Adrien de Leener (Netherlands) Jop Rappange (Thailand) Tanart Sathienthirakul	Porsche 911 GT3 R (992)	529	+8 Laps
31	S	56	(Italy) Dinamic GT Huber Racing	(Italy) Daniele Di Amato (Belgium) Adrien de Leener (Netherlands) Jop Rappange (Thailand) Tanart Sathienthirakul	Porsche M97/80 4.2 L Flat-6	529	+8 Laps
32	B	3	(Germany) GetSpeed	(Germany) Patrick Assenheimer (Germany) Kenneth Heyer (Australia) Alex Peroni (Germany) Florian Scholze	Mercedes-AMG GT3 Evo	529	+8 Laps
32	B	3	(Germany) GetSpeed	(Germany) Patrick Assenheimer (Germany) Kenneth Heyer (Australia) Alex Peroni (Germany) Florian Scholze	Mercedes-Benz M159 6.2 L V8	529	+8 Laps
33	B	62	(United Kingdom) Team Parker Racing	(United Kingdom) Kiern Jewiss (Netherlands) Xavier Maassen (United Kingdom) Andy Meyrick (United Kingdom) Derek Pierce	Porsche 911 GT3 R (992)	527	+10 Laps
33	B	62	(United Kingdom) Team Parker Racing	(United Kingdom) Kiern Jewiss (Netherlands) Xavier Maassen (United Kingdom) Andy Meyrick (United Kingdom) Derek Pierce	Porsche M97/80 4.2 L Flat-6	527	+10 Laps
34	B	188	(United Kingdom) Garage 59	(Portugal) Henrique Chaves (United States) Conrad Grunewald (Monaco) Louis Prette (Portugal) Miguel Ramos	McLaren 720S GT3 Evo	526	+11 Laps
34	B	188	(United Kingdom) Garage 59	(Portugal) Henrique Chaves (United States) Conrad Grunewald (Monaco) Louis Prette (Portugal) Miguel Ramos	McLaren M840T 4.0 L Twin-turbo V8	526	+11 Laps
35	PA	888	(France) CSA Racing	(France) Erwin Creed (Belgium) Jean Glorieux (France) Arthur Rougier (United Kingdom) Casper Stevenson	Audi R8 LMS Evo II	524	+13 Laps
35	PA	888	(France) CSA Racing	(France) Erwin Creed (Belgium) Jean Glorieux (France) Arthur Rougier (United Kingdom) Casper Stevenson	Audi DAR 5.2 L V10	524	+13 Laps
36	PA	216	(Hong Kong) Modena Motorsports	(Switzerland) Mathias Beche (Canada) John Shen (Denmark) Benny Simonsen (Netherlands) Francis Tjia	Porsche 911 GT3 R (992)	522	+15 Laps
36	PA	216	(Hong Kong) Modena Motorsports	(Switzerland) Mathias Beche (Canada) John Shen (Denmark) Benny Simonsen (Netherlands) Francis Tjia	Porsche M97/80 4.2 L Flat-6	522	+15 Laps
37	PA	16	(China) Uno Racing Team	(Hong Kong) Adderly Fong (China) Xiaole He (China) Junlin Pan (Hong Kong) "Rio"	Audi R8 LMS Evo II	520	+17 Laps
37	PA	16	(China) Uno Racing Team	(Hong Kong) Adderly Fong (China) Xiaole He (China) Junlin Pan (Hong Kong) "Rio"	Audi DAR 5.2 L V10	520	+17 Laps
38	G	57	(United States) Winward Racing	(Netherlands) Indy Dontje (Switzerland) Philip Ellis (United States) Russell Ward	Mercedes-AMG GT3 Evo	519	+18 Laps
38	G	57	(United States) Winward Racing	(Netherlands) Indy Dontje (Switzerland) Philip Ellis (United States) Russell Ward	Mercedes-Benz M159 6.2 L V8	519	+18 Laps
39	S	90	(Spain) MadPanda Motorsprt	(Norway) Magnus Gustavsen; Alexey Nesov (Argentina) Ezequiel Pérez Companc (Finland) Jesse Salmenautio	Mercedes-AMG GT3 Evo	519	+18 Laps
39	S	90	(Spain) MadPanda Motorsprt	(Norway) Magnus Gustavsen; Alexey Nesov (Argentina) Ezequiel Pérez Companc (Finland) Jesse Salmenautio	Mercedes-Benz M159 6.2 L V8	519	+18 Laps
40	S	33	(Spain) Bullitt Racing	(Canada) Jeff Kingsley (France) Romain Leroux (Germany) Jacob Riegel (Netherlands) Ruben del Sarte	Aston Martin Vantage AMR GT3	518	+19 Laps
40	S	33	(Spain) Bullitt Racing	(Canada) Jeff Kingsley (France) Romain Leroux (Germany) Jacob Riegel (Netherlands) Ruben del Sarte	Mercedes-Benz M177 4.0 L Twin-turbo V8	518	+19 Laps
41	PA	4	(United States) Crowdstrike Racing by Riley	(United States) Colin Braun (Brazil) Felipe Fraga (United Kingdom) Ian James (United States) George Kurtz	Mercedes-AMG GT3 Evo	516	+21 Laps
41	PA	4	(United States) Crowdstrike Racing by Riley	(United States) Colin Braun (Brazil) Felipe Fraga (United Kingdom) Ian James (United States) George Kurtz	Mercedes-Benz M159 6.2 L V8	516	+21 Laps
42	G	9	(Belgium) Boutsen VDS	(Italy) Alberto Di Folco (France) Adam Eteki (France) Thomas Laurent (France) Aurélien Panis	Audi R8 LMS Evo II	510	+27 Laps
42	G	9	(Belgium) Boutsen VDS	(Italy) Alberto Di Folco (France) Adam Eteki (France) Thomas Laurent (France) Aurélien Panis	Audi DAR 5.2 L V10	510	+27 Laps
43	B	50	(Italy) AF Corse	(United Kingdom) Simon Mann (Belgium) Ulysse de Pauw (France) Julien Piguet (Argentina) Nicolás Varrone	Ferrari 296 GT3	475	+62 Laps
43	B	50	(Italy) AF Corse	(United Kingdom) Simon Mann (Belgium) Ulysse de Pauw (France) Julien Piguet (Argentina) Nicolás Varrone	Ferrari F163 3.0 L Twin-turbo V6	475	+62 Laps
44	P	51	(Italy) AF Corse - Francorchamps Motors	(Denmark) Nicklas Nielsen (Italy) Alessio Rovera (Israel) Robert Shwartzman	Ferrari 296 GT3	455	+82 Laps
44	P	51	(Italy) AF Corse - Francorchamps Motors	(Denmark) Nicklas Nielsen (Italy) Alessio Rovera (Israel) Robert Shwartzman	Ferrari F163 3.0 L Twin-turbo V6	455	+82 Laps
45	B	23	(Australia) Grove Racing	(New Zealand) Earl Bamber (Australia) Brenton Grove (Australia) Stephen Grove (Australia) Anton de Pasquale	Porsche 911 GT3 R (992)	440	+97 Laps
45	B	23	(Australia) Grove Racing	(New Zealand) Earl Bamber (Australia) Brenton Grove (Australia) Stephen Grove (Australia) Anton de Pasquale	Porsche M97/80 4.2 L Flat-6	440	+97 Laps
46	B	35	(Germany) Walkenhorst Motorsport	(Norway) Anders Buchardt (United Kingdom) James Kell (France) Thomas Neubauer (United Kingdom) Bailey Voisin	BMW M4 GT3	431	+106 Laps
46	B	35	(Germany) Walkenhorst Motorsport	(Norway) Anders Buchardt (United Kingdom) James Kell (France) Thomas Neubauer (United Kingdom) Bailey Voisin	BMW S58B30T0 3.0 L Twin-turbo I6	431	+106 Laps
47	S	99	(Germany) Tresor Orange1	(Germany) Alex Aka (Italy) Pietro Delli Guanti (Italy) Lorenzo Patrese	Audi R8 LMS Evo II	429	+108 Laps
47	S	99	(Germany) Tresor Orange1	(Germany) Alex Aka (Italy) Pietro Delli Guanti (Italy) Lorenzo Patrese	Audi DAR 5.2 L V10	429	+108 Laps
48	B	55	(Italy) Dinamic GT Huber Racing	(United Kingdom) Ben Barker (Norway) Marius Nakken (Austria) Philipp Sager (Austria) Christopher Zöchling	Porsche 911 GT3 R (992)	396	+141 Laps
48	B	55	(Italy) Dinamic GT Huber Racing	(United Kingdom) Ben Barker (Norway) Marius Nakken (Austria) Philipp Sager (Austria) Christopher Zöchling	Porsche M97/80 4.2 L Flat-6	396	+141 Laps
49	S	60	(Italy) VSR	(Mexico) Luis Michael Dörrbecker (Belgium) Baptiste Moulin (Norway) Marcus Påverud (Israel) Artem Petrov	Lamborghini Huracán GT3 Evo2	393	+144 Laps
49	S	60	(Italy) VSR	(Mexico) Luis Michael Dörrbecker (Belgium) Baptiste Moulin (Norway) Marcus Påverud (Israel) Artem Petrov	Lamborghini DGF 5.2 L V10	393	+144 Laps
DNF	B	89	(France) AKKodis ASP Team	(Brazil) Adalberto Baptista (Brazil) Bruno Baptista (Brazil) Rodrigo Baptista (Brazil) Alan Hellmeister	Mercedes-AMG GT3 Evo	353	Engine
DNF	B	89	(France) AKKodis ASP Team	(Brazil) Adalberto Baptista (Brazil) Bruno Baptista (Brazil) Rodrigo Baptista (Brazil) Alan Hellmeister	Mercedes-Benz M159 6.2 L V8	353	Engine
DNF	P	999	(Hong Kong) Mercedes-AMG Team GruppeM Racing	(Germany) Maro Engel (Canada) Mikaël Grenier (Spain) Daniel Juncadella	Mercedes-AMG GT3 Evo	331	Bearing
DNF	P	999	(Hong Kong) Mercedes-AMG Team GruppeM Racing	(Germany) Maro Engel (Canada) Mikaël Grenier (Spain) Daniel Juncadella	Mercedes-Benz M159 6.2 L V8	331	Bearing
DNF	PA	64	(Germany) Haupt Racing Team	(United Kingdom) Matt Bell (United Kingdom) Frank Bird (United Kingdom) James Cottingham (United States) Naveen Rao	Mercedes-AMG GT3 Evo	308	Retired
DNF	PA	64	(Germany) Haupt Racing Team	(United Kingdom) Matt Bell (United Kingdom) Frank Bird (United Kingdom) James Cottingham (United States) Naveen Rao	Mercedes-Benz M159 6.2 L V8	308	Retired
DNF	P	87	(France) Mercedes-AMG Team AKKodis ASP	(France) Thomas Drouet (Italy) Lorenzo Ferrari (Germany) Maximilian Götz	Mercedes-AMG GT3 Evo	304	Radiator
DNF	P	87	(France) Mercedes-AMG Team AKKodis ASP	(France) Thomas Drouet (Italy) Lorenzo Ferrari (Germany) Maximilian Götz	Mercedes-Benz M159 6.2 L V8	304	Radiator
DNF	G	19	(Italy) Iron Lynx	(Italy) Michele Beretta (Switzerland) Rolf Ineichen (Italy) Leonardo Pulcini	Lamborghini Huracán GT3 Evo2	278	Throttle
DNF	G	19	(Italy) Iron Lynx	(Italy) Michele Beretta (Switzerland) Rolf Ineichen (Italy) Leonardo Pulcini	Lamborghini DGF 5.2 L V10	278	Throttle
DNF	B	8	(France) AGS Events	(Switzerland) Antonin Borga (Italy) Leonardo Gorini (France) Nico Jamin	Lamborghini Huracán GT3 Evo2	272	Retired
DNF	B	8	(France) AGS Events	(Switzerland) Antonin Borga (Italy) Leonardo Gorini (France) Nico Jamin	Lamborghini DGF 5.2 L V10	272	Retired
DNF	P	32	(Belgium) Team WRT	(South Africa) Sheldon van der Linde (Belgium) Dries Vanthoor (Belgium) Charles Weerts	BMW M4 GT3	250	Accident
DNF	P	32	(Belgium) Team WRT	(South Africa) Sheldon van der Linde (Belgium) Dries Vanthoor (Belgium) Charles Weerts	BMW S58B30T0 3.0 L Twin-turbo I6	250	Accident
DNF	P	998	(Germany) Rowe Racing	(United Kingdom) Daniel Harper (Germany) Max Hesse (United States) Neil Verhagen	BMW M4 GT3	250	Accident
DNF	P	998	(Germany) Rowe Racing	(United Kingdom) Daniel Harper (Germany) Max Hesse (United States) Neil Verhagen	BMW S58B30T0 3.0 L Twin-turbo I6	250	Accident
DNF	G	157	(United States) Winward Racing	(Switzerland) Miklas Born (Germany) David Schumacher (Germany) Marius Zug	Mercedes-AMG GT3 Evo	238	Mechanical
DNF	G	157	(United States) Winward Racing	(Switzerland) Miklas Born (Germany) David Schumacher (Germany) Marius Zug	Mercedes-Benz M159 6.2 L V8	238	Mechanical
DNF	P	159	(United Kingdom) Garage 59	(Germany) Benjamin Goethe (Germany) Marvin Kirchhöfer (Denmark) Nicolai Kjærgaard	McLaren 720S GT3 Evo	208	Suspension
DNF	P	159	(United Kingdom) Garage 59	(Germany) Benjamin Goethe (Germany) Marvin Kirchhöfer (Denmark) Nicolai Kjærgaard	McLaren M840T 4.0 L Twin-turbo V8	208	Suspension
DNF	B	81	(Saudi Arabia) Theeba Motorsport	(Estonia) Ralf Aron (Saudi Arabia) Reema Juffali (Switzerland) Yannick Mettler (Switzerland) Alain Valente	Mercedes-AMG GT3 Evo	200	Accident
DNF	B	81	(Saudi Arabia) Theeba Motorsport	(Estonia) Ralf Aron (Saudi Arabia) Reema Juffali (Switzerland) Yannick Mettler (Switzerland) Alain Valente	Mercedes-Benz M159 6.2 L V8	200	Accident
DNF	PA	38	(Germany) ST Racing with Rinaldi	(United States) Jon Miller (Canada) Samantha Tan (Spain) Isaac Tutumlu (Germany) Leonard Weiss	Ferrari 296 GT3	192	Contact damage
DNF	PA	38	(Germany) ST Racing with Rinaldi	(United States) Jon Miller (Canada) Samantha Tan (Spain) Isaac Tutumlu (Germany) Leonard Weiss	Ferrari F163 3.0 L Twin-turbo V6	192	Contact damage
DNF	S	58	(Austria) GRT Grasser Racing Team	(Australia) Ricky Capo (Italy) Fabrizio Crestani (United Kingdom) Sam Neary (Austria) Gerhard Tweraser	Lamborghini Huracán GT3 Evo2	188	Mechanical
DNF	S	58	(Austria) GRT Grasser Racing Team	(Australia) Ricky Capo (Italy) Fabrizio Crestani (United Kingdom) Sam Neary (Austria) Gerhard Tweraser	Lamborghini DGF 5.2 L V10	188	Mechanical
DNF	S	10	(Belgium) Boutsen VDS	(France) Loris Cabirou (Italy) Andrea Cola (France) César Gazeau (Israel) Roee Meyuhas	Audi R8 LMS Evo II	186	Contact
DNF	S	10	(Belgium) Boutsen VDS	(France) Loris Cabirou (Italy) Andrea Cola (France) César Gazeau (Israel) Roee Meyuhas	Audi DAR 5.2 L V10	186	Contact
DNF	PA	70	(Germany) Crowdstrike Racing by Leipert Motorsport	(United States) Jean-Francois Bruno (New Zealand) Brendon Leitch (China) Kerong Li (United States) Gerhard Watzinger	Lamborghini Huracán GT3 Evo2	184	Accident
DNF	PA	70	(Germany) Crowdstrike Racing by Leipert Motorsport	(United States) Jean-Francois Bruno (New Zealand) Brendon Leitch (China) Kerong Li (United States) Gerhard Watzinger	Lamborghini DGF 5.2 L V10	184	Accident
DNF	P	63	(Italy) Iron Lynx	(Italy) Mirko Bortolotti (Italy) Andrea Caldarelli (South Africa) Jordan Pepper	Lamborghini Huracán GT3 Evo2	184	Brakes
DNF	P	63	(Italy) Iron Lynx	(Italy) Mirko Bortolotti (Italy) Andrea Caldarelli (South Africa) Jordan Pepper	Lamborghini DGF 5.2 L V10	184	Brakes
DNF	PA	78	(United Kingdom) Barwell Motorsport	(United Kingdom) Rob Collard (Finland) Patrick Kujala (Denmark) Dennis Lind (United Arab Emirates) Bashar Mardini	Lamborghini Huracán GT3 Evo2	173	Brakes
DNF	PA	78	(United Kingdom) Barwell Motorsport	(United Kingdom) Rob Collard (Finland) Patrick Kujala (Denmark) Dennis Lind (United Arab Emirates) Bashar Mardini	Lamborghini DGF 5.2 L V10	173	Brakes
DNF	PA	2	(Germany) GetSpeed	(United States) Lance Bergstein (Poland) Andrzej Lewandowski (United Kingdom) Aaron Walker (United Kingdom) Lewis Williamson	Mercedes-AMG GT3 Evo	162	Contact damage
DNF	PA	2	(Germany) GetSpeed	(United States) Lance Bergstein (Poland) Andrzej Lewandowski (United Kingdom) Aaron Walker (United Kingdom) Lewis Williamson	Mercedes-Benz M159 6.2 L V8	162	Contact damage
DNF	B	83	(Italy) Iron Dames	(Belgium) Sarah Bovy (Switzerland) Rahel Frey (Denmark) Michelle Gatting (France) Doriane Pin	Lamborghini Huracán GT3 Evo2	151	Accident
DNF	B	83	(Italy) Iron Dames	(Belgium) Sarah Bovy (Switzerland) Rahel Frey (Denmark) Michelle Gatting (France) Doriane Pin	Lamborghini DGF 5.2 L V10	151	Accident
DNF	B	7	(United Kingdom) Inception Racing	(United States) Brendan Iribe (United Kingdom) Ollie Millroy (Spain) Fran Rueda (Denmark) Frederik Schandorff	McLaren 720S GT3 Evo	74	Electrical
DNF	B	7	(United Kingdom) Inception Racing	(United States) Brendan Iribe (United Kingdom) Ollie Millroy (Spain) Fran Rueda (Denmark) Frederik Schandorff	McLaren M840T 4.0 L Twin-turbo V8	74	Electrical
DNF	PA	132	(United States) GMG Racing by Car Collection Motorsport	(Netherlands) Jeroen Bleekemolen (United States) Patrick Long (United States) James Sofronas (United States) Kyle Washington	Porsche 911 GT3 R (992)	2	Accident
DNF	PA	132	(United States) GMG Racing by Car Collection Motorsport	(Netherlands) Jeroen Bleekemolen (United States) Patrick Long (United States) James Sofronas (United States) Kyle Washington	Porsche M97/80 4.2 L Flat-6	2	Accident

Icon	Class
**P**	Pro Cup
**G**	Gold Cup
**S**	Silver Cup
**PA**	Pro-Am Cup
**B**	Bronze Cup

== Notes ==
Intercontinental GT Challenge
Previous race: 2023 Kyalami 9 Hours	2023 season	Next race: 2023 Indianapolis 8 Hours
