= Lola B11/40 =

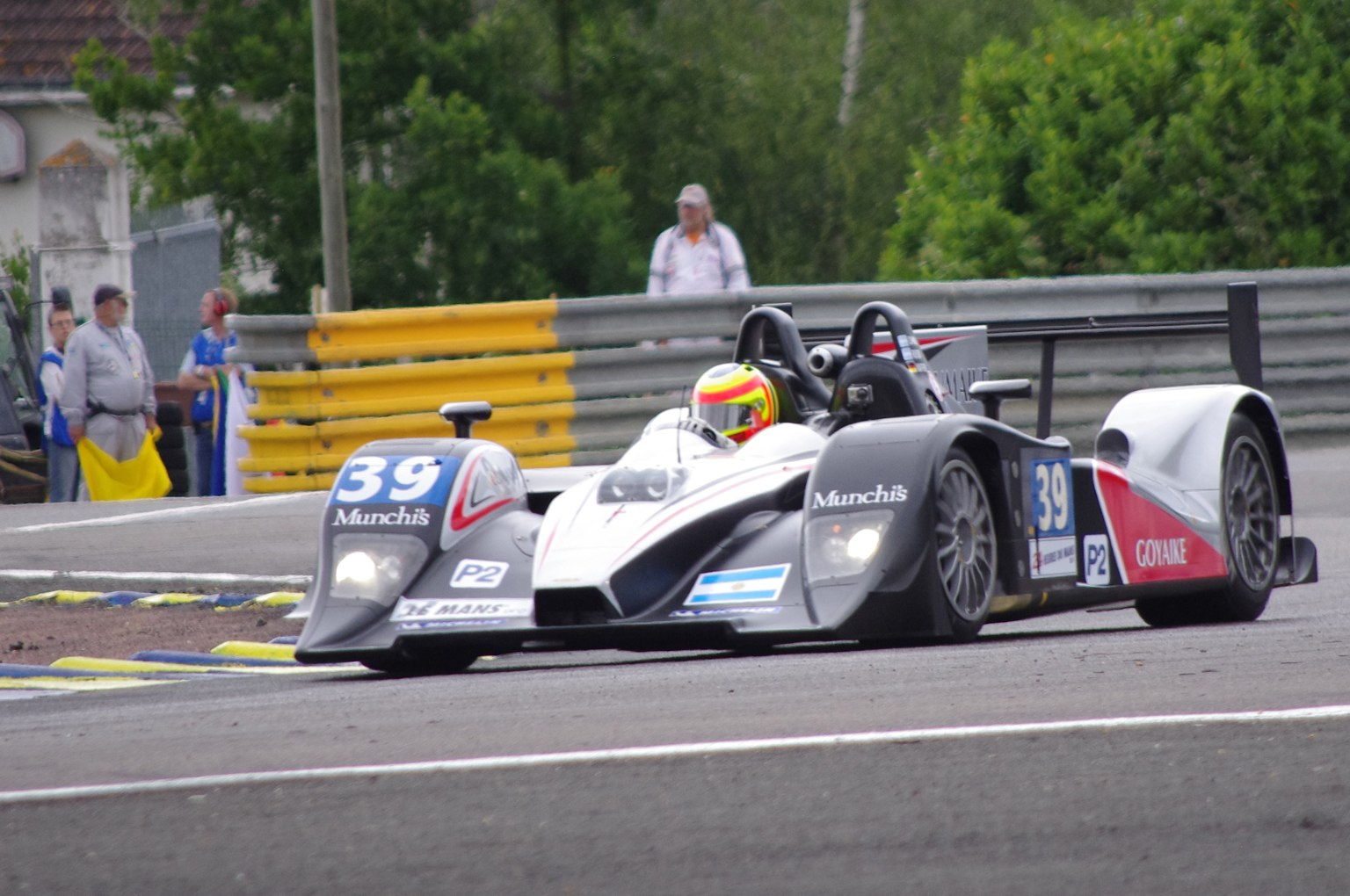
- Pierre Kaffer driving the No. 39 PeCom Racing B11/40 during the 2011 24 Hours of Le Mans
- Category: Le Mans Prototype LMP2
- Constructor: Lola Cars International
- Designer: Julian Sole

Technical specifications
- Chassis: Carbon fibre monocoque
- Suspension (front): Double wishbone, push-rod actuated coil springs over dampers
- Suspension (rear): Double wishbone, push-rod actuated coil springs over dampers
- Engine: Judd-BMW HK 3.6 L V8 naturally aspirated HPD HR28TT 2.8 L V6 turbocharged mid-engined, longitudinally mounted
- Transmission: Lola HT 6-Speed sequential manual
- Weight: 900 kg (2,000 lb)
- Tyres: Michelin; Dunlop; Continental

Competition history
- Notable entrants: (United States) Level 5 Motorsports (Argentina) Pecom Racing (Netherlands) DKR Engineering
- Notable drivers: (United States) Scott Tucker (France) Christophe Bouchut (United States) Ryan Hunter-Reay (Mexico) Luis Díaz (Argentina) Luís Pérez Companc (Argentina) Matías Russo (Germany) Pierre Kaffer
- Debut: 2011 12 Hours of Sebring
- Last event: 2013 24 Hours of Le Mans
Races	Wins	Poles	F/Laps
12	2	1	1
- Constructors' Championships: 0
- Drivers' Championships: 0

The Lola B11/40 is an open-top Le Mans Prototype (LMP) built by Lola Cars International. It is the first car to be designed to the new Automobile Club de l'Ouest (ACO) LMP2 "low cost formula" where cars will be powered exclusively by production series engines with a cap of €75,000 on the engine and €325,000 – €400,000 for a complete car. Engine options that will be available include BMW, Ford, HPD, Jaguar, Nissan and Toyota.

== Development ==
Announced on 21 July 2010, the B11/40 is a Carbon fibre open-top monocoque race car features an all-carbon bodykit, quick-release removable rear bodywork which includes a stabilisation fin on the engine cover which is a safety requirement of the new regulations.
