= 2009 Road Race Showcase =

Track map of Road America.

The 2009 Time Warner Cable Road Race Showcase was the seventh round of the 2009 American Le Mans Series season. It took place at Road America, Elkhart Lake, Wisconsin on August 16, 2009. David Brabham and Scott Sharp won for Patrón Highcroft Racing, while fellow Acura team Lowe's Fernández Racing won the LMP2 category. BMW Rahal Letterman Racing won their first race of the season in the GT2 category, while Snow Racing led the ALMS Challenge class.

== Report ==
=== Qualifying ===
==== Qualifying result ====
Pole position winners in each class are marked in bold.

Pos	Class	Team	Qualifying Driver	Lap Time
1	**LMP1**	**#66 de Ferran Motorsports**	**Gil de Ferran**	**1:48.216**
2	LMP1	#9 Patrón Highcroft Racing	David Brabham	1:49.039
3	**LMP2**	**#20 Dyson Racing Team**	**Marino Franchitti**	**1:51.010**
4	LMP2	#15 Lowe's Fernández Racing	Adrian Fernández	1:51.222
5	LMP2	#16 Dyson Racing Team	Guy Smith	1:51.832
6	LMP2	#6 Team CytoSport	Klaus Graf	1:51.922
7	LMP1	#12 Autocon Motorsports	Chris McMurry	1:53.649
8	LMP1	#37 Intersport Racing	Jon Field	1:55.209
9	**GT2**	**#90 BMW Rahal Letterman Racing**	**Joey Hand**	**2:06.950**
10	GT2	#92 BMW Rahal Letterman Racing	Dirk Müller	2:07.073
11	GT2	#45 Flying Lizard Motorsports	Jörg Bergmeister	2:07.362
12	GT2	#3 Corvette Racing	Jan Magnussen	2:07.387
13	GT2	#4 Corvette Racing	Olivier Beretta	2:07.619
14	GT2	#87 Farnbacher-Loles Motorsport	Wolf Henzler	2:07.740
15	GT2	#62 Risi Competizione	Jaime Melo	2:07.740
16	GT2	#40 Robertson Racing	David Murry	2:08.188
17	GT2	#21 Panoz Team PTG	Dominik Farnbacher	2:08.800
18	GT2	#11 Primetime Race Group	Chris Hall	2:08.822
19	GT2	#44 Flying Lizard Motorsports	Seth Neiman	2:13.501
20	**Chal**	**#47 Orbit Racing**	**Guy Cosmo**	**2:16.098**
21	Chal	#57 Snow Racing	Martin Snow	2:17.202
22	Chal	#08 Orbit Racing	Bill Sweedler	2:18.289
23	Chal	#36 Gruppe Orange	Bob Faieta	2:18.970
24	Chal	#02 Gruppe Orange	Donald Pickering	2:20.554
25	Chal	#05 GMG Racing	Did Not Participate	
26	LMP1	#48 Corsa Motorsports	Did Not Participate	

=== Race ===
==== Race result ====
Class winners are marked in bold. Cars failing to complete 70% of winner's distance marked as Not Classified (NC).

Pos	Class	No	Team	Drivers	Chassis	Tire	Laps
Pos	Class	No	Team	Drivers	Engine	Tire	Laps
1	**LMP1**	**9**	**(United States) Patrón Highcroft Racing**	**(Australia) David Brabham (United States) Scott Sharp**	**Acura ARX-02a**	MI	**71**
1	**LMP1**	**9**	**(United States) Patrón Highcroft Racing**	**(Australia) David Brabham (United States) Scott Sharp**	**Acura AR7 4.0 L V8**	MI	**71**
2	LMP1	66	(United States) de Ferran Motorsports	(Brazil) Gil de Ferran (France) Simon Pagenaud	Acura ARX-02a	MI	71
2	LMP1	66	(United States) de Ferran Motorsports	(Brazil) Gil de Ferran (France) Simon Pagenaud	Acura AR7 4.0 L V8	MI	71
3	**LMP2**	**15**	**(Mexico) Lowe's Fernández Racing**	**(Mexico) Adrian Fernández (Mexico) Luis Díaz**	**Acura ARX-01B**	MI	**71**
3	**LMP2**	**15**	**(Mexico) Lowe's Fernández Racing**	**(Mexico) Adrian Fernández (Mexico) Luis Díaz**	**Acura AL7R 3.4 L V8**	MI	**71**
4	LMP2	20	(United States) Dyson Racing Team	(United States) Butch Leitzinger (United Kingdom) Marino Franchitti	Lola B08/86	MI	71
4	LMP2	20	(United States) Dyson Racing Team	(United States) Butch Leitzinger (United Kingdom) Marino Franchitti	Mazda MZR-R 2.0 L Turbo I4	MI	71
5	LMP2	6	(United States) Team Cytosport	(United States) Greg Pickett (Germany) Klaus Graf	Porsche RS Spyder Evo	MI	71
5	LMP2	6	(United States) Team Cytosport	(United States) Greg Pickett (Germany) Klaus Graf	Porsche MR6 3.4 L V8	MI	71
6	LMP1	37	(United States) Intersport Racing	(United States) Jon Field (United States) Clint Field	Lola B06/10	D	71
6	LMP1	37	(United States) Intersport Racing	(United States) Jon Field (United States) Clint Field	AER P32C 4.0 L Turbo V8	D	71
7	LMP1	48	(United States) Corsa Motorsports	(United Kingdom) Johnny Mowlem (Sweden) Stefan Johansson	Ginetta-Zytek GZ09HS	D	70
7	LMP1	48	(United States) Corsa Motorsports	(United Kingdom) Johnny Mowlem (Sweden) Stefan Johansson	Zytek ZJ458 4.5 L Hybrid V8	D	70
8	LMP1	12	(United States) Autocon Motorsports	(United States) Bryan Willman (United States) Chris McMurry	Lola B06/10	D	70
8	LMP1	12	(United States) Autocon Motorsports	(United States) Bryan Willman (United States) Chris McMurry	AER P32C 4.0 L Turbo V8	D	70
9	**GT2**	**90**	**(United States) BMW Rahal Letterman Racing**	**(United States) Bill Auberlen (United States) Joey Hand**	**BMW M3 GT2**	D	**69**
9	**GT2**	**90**	**(United States) BMW Rahal Letterman Racing**	**(United States) Bill Auberlen (United States) Joey Hand**	**BMW 4.0 L V8**	D	**69**
10	GT2	92	(United States) BMW Rahal Letterman Racing	(United States) Tommy Milner (Germany) Dirk Müller	BMW M3 GT2	D	68
10	GT2	92	(United States) BMW Rahal Letterman Racing	(United States) Tommy Milner (Germany) Dirk Müller	BMW 4.0 L V8	D	68
11	GT2	3	(United States) Corvette Racing	(United States) Johnny O'Connell (Denmark) Jan Magnussen	Chevrolet Corvette C6.R	MI	68
11	GT2	3	(United States) Corvette Racing	(United States) Johnny O'Connell (Denmark) Jan Magnussen	Chevrolet 6.0 L V8	MI	68
12	GT2	45	(United States) Flying Lizard Motorsports	(United States) Patrick Long (Germany) Jörg Bergmeister	Porsche 997 GT3-RSR	MI	68
12	GT2	45	(United States) Flying Lizard Motorsports	(United States) Patrick Long (Germany) Jörg Bergmeister	Porsche 4.0 L Flat-6	MI	68
13	GT2	62	(United States) Risi Competizione	(Brazil) Jaime Melo (Germany) Pierre Kaffer	Ferrari F430GT	MI	68
13	GT2	62	(United States) Risi Competizione	(Brazil) Jaime Melo (Germany) Pierre Kaffer	Ferrari 4.0 L V8	MI	68
14	GT2	4	(United States) Corvette Racing	(United Kingdom) Oliver Gavin (Monaco) Olivier Beretta	Chevrolet Corvette C6.R	MI	67
14	GT2	4	(United States) Corvette Racing	(United Kingdom) Oliver Gavin (Monaco) Olivier Beretta	Chevrolet 6.0 L V8	MI	67
15	GT2	40	(United States) Robertson Racing	(United States) David Robertson (United States) Andrea Robertson (United States) David Murry	Ford GT-R Mk. VII	D	66
15	GT2	40	(United States) Robertson Racing	(United States) David Robertson (United States) Andrea Robertson (United States) David Murry	Ford 5.0 L V8	D	66
16	GT2	44	(United States) Flying Lizard Motorsports	(United States) Darren Law (United States) Seth Neiman	Porsche 997 GT3-RSR	MI	65
16	GT2	44	(United States) Flying Lizard Motorsports	(United States) Darren Law (United States) Seth Neiman	Porsche 4.0 L Flat-6	MI	65
17	**Chal**	**57**	**(United States) Snow Racing**	**(United States) Martin Snow (United States) Melanie Snow**	**Porsche 997 GT3 Cup**	Y	**63**
17	**Chal**	**57**	**(United States) Snow Racing**	**(United States) Martin Snow (United States) Melanie Snow**	**Porsche 3.6 L Flat-6**	Y	**63**
18	GT2	11	(United States) Primetime Race Group	(United States) Joel Feinberg (United Kingdom) Chris Hall	Dodge Viper Competition Coupe	D	63
18	GT2	11	(United States) Primetime Race Group	(United States) Joel Feinberg (United Kingdom) Chris Hall	Dodge 8.3 L V10	D	63
19	Chal	02	(United States) Gruppe Orange	(United States) Nick Parker (United States) Donald Pickering	Porsche 997 GT3 Cup	Y	62
19	Chal	02	(United States) Gruppe Orange	(United States) Nick Parker (United States) Donald Pickering	Porsche 3.6 L Flat-6	Y	62
20	Chal	36	(United States) Gruppe Orange	(United States) Wesley Hoaglund (United States) Bob Faieta	Porsche 997 GT3 Cup	Y	62
20	Chal	36	(United States) Gruppe Orange	(United States) Wesley Hoaglund (United States) Bob Faieta	Porsche 3.6 L Flat-6	Y	62
21	Chal	47	(United States) Orbit Racing	(United States) Guy Cosmo (United States) John Baker	Porsche 997 GT3 Cup	Y	61
21	Chal	47	(United States) Orbit Racing	(United States) Guy Cosmo (United States) John Baker	Porsche 3.6 L Flat-6	Y	61
22	Chal	08	(United States) Orbit Racing	(United States) Ed Brown (United States) Bill Sweedler	Porsche 997 GT3 Cup	Y	61
22	Chal	08	(United States) Orbit Racing	(United States) Ed Brown (United States) Bill Sweedler	Porsche 3.6 L Flat-6	Y	61
23 DNF	GT2	87	(United States) Farnbacher-Loles Motorsports	(Germany) Wolf Henzler (United States) Bryce Miller	Porsche 997 GT3-RSR	MI	56
23 DNF	GT2	87	(United States) Farnbacher-Loles Motorsports	(Germany) Wolf Henzler (United States) Bryce Miller	Porsche 4.0 L Flat-6	MI	56
24	GT2	21	(United States) Panoz Team PTG	(United Kingdom) Ian James (Germany) Dominik Farnbacher	Panoz Esperante GT-LM	Y	54
24	GT2	21	(United States) Panoz Team PTG	(United Kingdom) Ian James (Germany) Dominik Farnbacher	Ford 5.0 L V8	Y	54
25 DNF	LMP2	16	(United States) Dyson Racing Team	(United States) Chris Dyson (United Kingdom) Guy Smith	Lola B09/86	MI	50
25 DNF	LMP2	16	(United States) Dyson Racing Team	(United States) Chris Dyson (United Kingdom) Guy Smith	Mazda MZR-R 2.0 L Turbo I4	MI	50
DNQ	Chal	05	(United States) GMG Racing	(United States) Bret Curtis (United States) James Sofronas	Porsche 997 GT3 Cup	Y	–
DNQ	Chal	05	(United States) GMG Racing	(United States) Bret Curtis (United States) James Sofronas	Porsche 3.6 L Flat-6	Y	–

American Le Mans Series
Previous race: Sports Car Challenge of Mid-Ohio	2009 season	Next race: Grand Prix of Mosport
