= 2009 Grand Prix of Mosport =

Mosport International Raceway

The 2009 Grand Prix of Mosport presented by Mobil 1 is the eighth round of the 2009 American Le Mans Series season. It took place at Mosport International Raceway, Bowmanville, Ontario, Canada on August 30, 2009. David Brabham and Scott Sharp won their second straight ALMS race for Patrón Highcroft Racing Acura, while drivers Adrian Fernández and Luis Díaz and the Lowe's Fernández Racing Acura team secured their respective LMP2 championships with victory at Mosport, their seventh of the season. Corvette Racing earned their first victory since the team moved to the GT2 category two rounds prior. The ALMS Challenge category did not participate in this event due to the high speed differences between various classes.

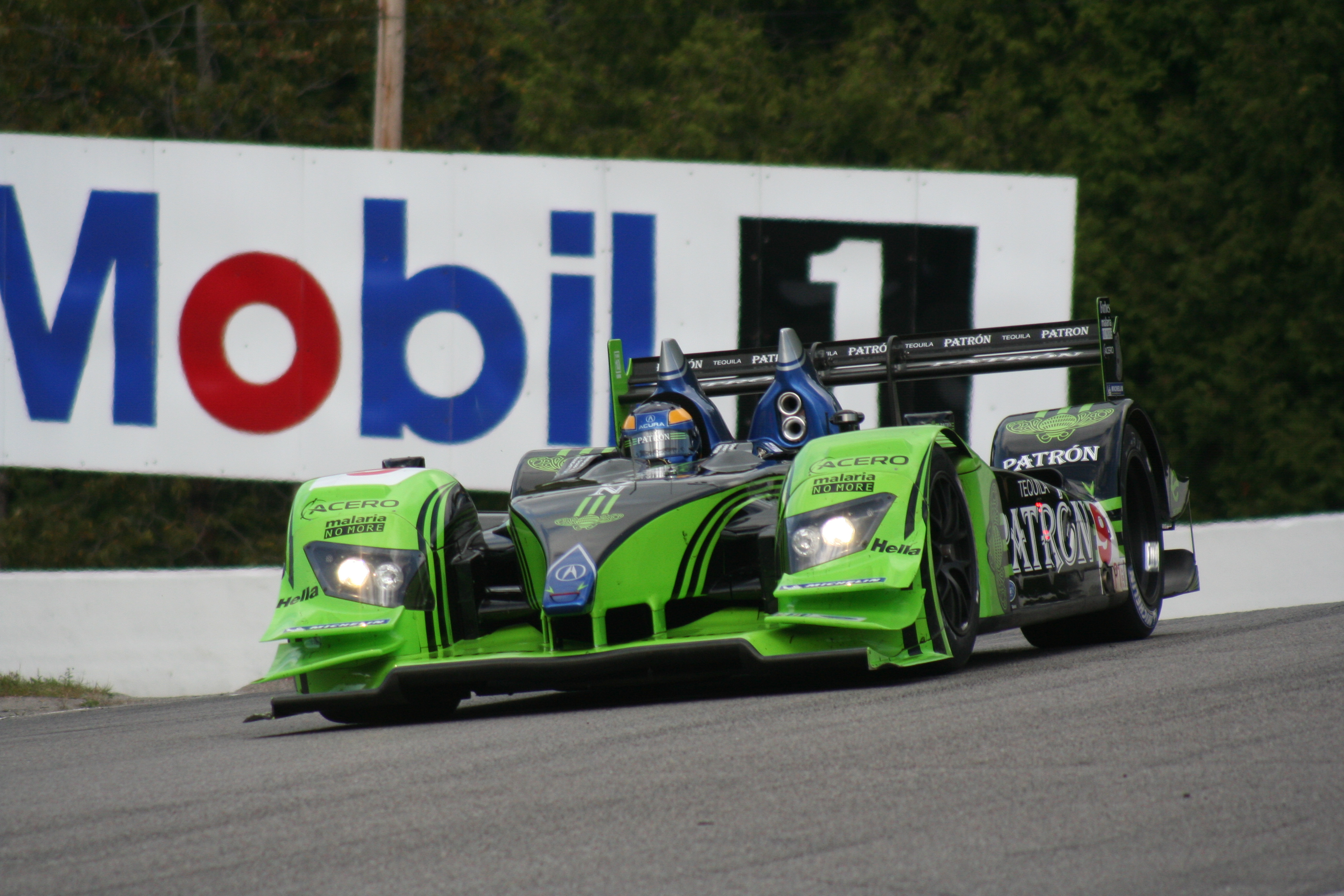
Patrón Highcroft Racing Acura ARX-02a - Winner 2009 Grand Prix of Mosport

== Report ==
=== Qualifying ===
==== Qualifying result ====
Pole position winners in each class are marked in bold.

Pos	Class	Team	Qualifying Driver	Lap Time
1	**LMP1**	**#9 Patrón Highcroft Racing**	**David Brabham**	**1:05.323**
2	LMP1	#66 de Ferran Motorsports	Simon Pagenaud	1:05.397
3	**LMP2**	**#20 Dyson Racing Team**	**Marino Franchitti**	**1:06.379**
4	LMP1	#37 Intersport Racing	Jon Field	1:06.764
5	LMP2	#16 Dyson Racing Team	Chris Dyson	1:06.853
6	LMP2	#15 Lowe's Fernández Racing	Luis Díaz	1:06.944
7	LMP1	#12 Autocon Motorsport	Tony Burgess	1:10.613
8	LMP2	#19 van der Steur Racing	Adam Pecorari	1:11.391
9	**GT2**	**#92 BMW Rahal Letterman Racing**	**Dirk Müller**	**1:17.528**
10	GT2	#90 BMW Rahal Letterman Racing	Joey Hand	1:17.657
11	GT2	#87 Farnbacher-Loles Motorsports	Wolf Henzler	1:17.788
12	GT2	#4 Corvette Racing	Oliver Gavin	1:17.959
13	GT2	#3 Corvette Racing	Johnny O'Connell	1:18.309
14	GT2	#45 Flying Lizard Motorsports	Patrick Long	1:18.361
15	GT2	#21 Panoz Team PTG	Dominik Farnbacher	1:18.778
16	GT2	#40 Robertson Racing	David Murry	1:19.208
17	GT2	#44 Flying Lizard Motorsports	Johannes van Overbeek	1:19.475
18	GT2	#11 Primetime Race Group	Chris Hall	1:19.746
19	GT2	#62 Risi Competizione	Did Not Participate	

=== Race ===
==== Race result ====
Class winners are marked in bold. Cars failing to complete 70% of winner's distance marked as Not Classified (NC).

Pos	Class	No	Team	Drivers	Chassis	Tire	Laps
Pos	Class	No	Team	Drivers	Engine	Tire	Laps
1	**LMP1**	**9**	**(United States) Patrón Highcroft Racing**	**(Australia) David Brabham (United States) Scott Sharp**	**Acura ARX-02a**	MI	**131**
1	**LMP1**	**9**	**(United States) Patrón Highcroft Racing**	**(Australia) David Brabham (United States) Scott Sharp**	**Acura AR7 4.0 L V8**	MI	**131**
2	LMP1	66	(United States) de Ferran Motorsports	(Brazil) Gil de Ferran (France) Simon Pagenaud	Acura ARX-02a	MI	130
2	LMP1	66	(United States) de Ferran Motorsports	(Brazil) Gil de Ferran (France) Simon Pagenaud	Acura AR7 4.0 L V8	MI	130
3	**LMP2**	**15**	**(Mexico) Lowe's Fernández Racing**	**(Mexico) Adrian Fernández (Mexico) Luis Díaz**	**Acura ARX-01B**	MI	**127**
3	**LMP2**	**15**	**(Mexico) Lowe's Fernández Racing**	**(Mexico) Adrian Fernández (Mexico) Luis Díaz**	**Acura AL7R 3.4 L V8**	MI	**127**
4	LMP1	37	(United States) Intersport Racing	(United States) Jon Field (United States) Clint Field	Lola B06/10	D	125
4	LMP1	37	(United States) Intersport Racing	(United States) Jon Field (United States) Clint Field	AER P32C 4.0 L Turbo V8	D	125
5 DNF	LMP2	20	(United States) Dyson Racing Team	(United States) Butch Leitzinger (United Kingdom) Marino Franchitti	Lola B08/86	MI	118
5 DNF	LMP2	20	(United States) Dyson Racing Team	(United States) Butch Leitzinger (United Kingdom) Marino Franchitti	Mazda MZR-R 2.0 L Turbo I4	MI	118
6	**GT2**	**3**	**(United States) Corvette Racing**	**(United States) Johnny O'Connell (Denmark) Jan Magnussen**	**Chevrolet Corvette C6.R**	MI	**117**
6	**GT2**	**3**	**(United States) Corvette Racing**	**(United States) Johnny O'Connell (Denmark) Jan Magnussen**	**Chevrolet 6.0 L V8**	MI	**117**
7	GT2	62	(United States) Risi Competizione	(Brazil) Jaime Melo (Germany) Pierre Kaffer	Ferrari F430GT	MI	117
7	GT2	62	(United States) Risi Competizione	(Brazil) Jaime Melo (Germany) Pierre Kaffer	Ferrari 4.0 L V8	MI	117
8	GT2	4	(United States) Corvette Racing	(United Kingdom) Oliver Gavin (Monaco) Olivier Beretta	Chevrolet Corvette C6.R	MI	116
8	GT2	4	(United States) Corvette Racing	(United Kingdom) Oliver Gavin (Monaco) Olivier Beretta	Chevrolet 6.0 L V8	MI	116
9	GT2	87	(United States) Farnbacher-Loles Motorsports	(Germany) Wolf Henzler (Germany) Dirk Werner	Porsche 997 GT3-RSR	MI	116
9	GT2	87	(United States) Farnbacher-Loles Motorsports	(Germany) Wolf Henzler (Germany) Dirk Werner	Porsche 4.0 L Flat-6	MI	116
10	GT2	45	(United States) Flying Lizard Motorsports	(United States) Patrick Long (Germany) Jörg Bergmeister	Porsche 997 GT3-RSR	MI	115
10	GT2	45	(United States) Flying Lizard Motorsports	(United States) Patrick Long (Germany) Jörg Bergmeister	Porsche 4.0 L Flat-6	MI	115
11	GT2	21	(United States) Panoz Team PTG	(United Kingdom) Ian James (Germany) Dominik Farnbacher	Panoz Esperante GT-LM	Y	115
11	GT2	21	(United States) Panoz Team PTG	(United Kingdom) Ian James (Germany) Dominik Farnbacher	Ford 5.0 L V8	Y	115
12	GT2	44	(United States) Flying Lizard Motorsports	(United States) Darren Law (United States) Johannes van Overbeek	Porsche 997 GT3-RSR	MI	115
12	GT2	44	(United States) Flying Lizard Motorsports	(United States) Darren Law (United States) Johannes van Overbeek	Porsche 4.0 L Flat-6	MI	115
13	GT2	11	(United States) Primetime Race Group	(United States) Joel Feinberg (United Kingdom) Chris Hall	Dodge Viper Competition Coupe	D	113
13	GT2	11	(United States) Primetime Race Group	(United States) Joel Feinberg (United Kingdom) Chris Hall	Dodge 8.3 L V10	D	113
14	GT2	90	(United States) BMW Rahal Letterman Racing	(United States) Bill Auberlen (United States) Joey Hand	BMW M3 GT2	D	110
14	GT2	90	(United States) BMW Rahal Letterman Racing	(United States) Bill Auberlen (United States) Joey Hand	BMW 4.0 L V8	D	110
15	GT2	40	(United States) Robertson Racing	(United States) David Robertson (United States) Andrea Robertson (United States) David Murry	Ford GT-R Mk. VII	D	105
15	GT2	40	(United States) Robertson Racing	(United States) David Robertson (United States) Andrea Robertson (United States) David Murry	Ford 5.0 L V8	D	105
16 DNF	GT2	92	(United States) BMW Rahal Letterman Racing	(United States) Tommy Milner (Germany) Dirk Müller	BMW M3 GT2	D	71
16 DNF	GT2	92	(United States) BMW Rahal Letterman Racing	(United States) Tommy Milner (Germany) Dirk Müller	BMW 4.0 L V8	D	71
17 DNF	LMP1	12	(United States) Autocon Motorsports	(Canada) Tony Burgess (United States) Chris McMurry	Lola B06/10	D	63
17 DNF	LMP1	12	(United States) Autocon Motorsports	(Canada) Tony Burgess (United States) Chris McMurry	AER P32C 4.0 L Turbo V8	D	63
18 DNF	LMP2	16	(United States) Dyson Racing Team	(United States) Chris Dyson (United Kingdom) Guy Smith	Lola B09/86	MI	43
18 DNF	LMP2	16	(United States) Dyson Racing Team	(United States) Chris Dyson (United Kingdom) Guy Smith	Mazda MZR-R 2.0 L Turbo I4	MI	43
DSQ	LMP2	19	(United States) van der Steur Racing	(United States) Gunnar van der Steur (United States) Adam Pecorari	Radical SR9	KU	116
DSQ	LMP2	19	(United States) van der Steur Racing	(United States) Gunnar van der Steur (United States) Adam Pecorari	AER P07 2.0 L I4	KU	116
ALMS FINAL RACE REPORT

American Le Mans Series
Previous race: Road Race Showcase	2009 season	Next race: Petit Le Mans
