= 2009 Northeast Grand Prix =

Track map of Lime Rock Park

The 2009 American Le Mans Northeast Grand Prix was the fifth round of the 2009 American Le Mans Series season. It took place at Lime Rock Park, Connecticut on July 18, 2009.

The race was won by Simon Pagenaud and Gil de Ferran in the de Ferran Motorsports Acura, their third American Le Mans Series victory in a row. Dyson Racing Team earned their first victory with Mazda in the LMP2 category, overcoming several mechanical issues during the race. Flying Lizard Motorsports continued their season streak with their fourth consecutive win, while Gruppe Orange won in the ALMS Challenge category.

Corsa Motorsports also became the first American Le Mans Series competitor to utilize a hybrid electric drivetrain on their Le Mans Prototype during an event, eventually completing the race in third position.

== Report ==
=== Qualifying ===
==== Qualifying result ====
Pole position winners in each class are marked in bold.

Pos	Class	Team	Qualifying Driver	Lap Time
1	**LMP1**	**#66 de Ferran Motorsports**	**Simon Pagenaud**	**0:46.971**
2	LMP1	#9 Patrón Highcroft Racing	David Brabham	0:47.345
3	**LMP2**	**#15 Lowe's Fernandez Racing**	**Adrian Fernández**	**0:48.281**
4	LMP2	#20 Dyson Racing	Marino Franchitti	0:48.477
5	LMP2	#16 Dyson Racing	Chris Dyson	0:48.661
6	LMP1	#48 Corsa Motorsports	Johnny Mowlem	0:49.464
7	LMP1	#37 Intersport Racing	Clint Field	0:49.935
8	LMP1	#12 Autocon Motorsports	Chris McMurry	0:53.523
9	**GT2**	**#62 Risi Competizione**	**Jaime Melo**	**0:54.665**
10	GT2	#45 Flying Lizard Motorsports	Patrick Long	0:54.729
11	GT2	#87 Farnbacher-Loles Motorsports	Wolf Henzler	0:55.026
12	GT2	#90 BMW Rahal Letterman Racing	Joey Hand	0:55.049
13	GT2	#92 BMW Rahal Letterman Racing	Dirk Müller	0:55.050
14	GT2	#40 Robertson Racing	David Murry	0:55.118
15	GT2	#18 T-Mobile VICI Racing	Richard Westbrook	0:55.387
16	GT2	#21 Panoz Team PTG	Dominik Farnbacher	0:55.542
17	GT2	#11 Primetime Race Group	Chris Hall	0:56.736
18	GT2	#44 Flying Lizard Motorsports	Seth Neiman	0:57.405
19	**Chal**	**#36 Gruppe Orange**	**Bob Faieta**	**0:59.618**
20	Chal	#57 Snow Racing	Martin Snow	0:59.971
21	Chal	#08 Orbit Racing	Bill Sweedler	1:00.459
22	Chal	#02 Gruppe Orange	Donald Pickering	1:01.645
23	LMP2	#19 van der Steur Racing	No Time	
24	Chal	#47 Orbit Racing	No Time	

=== Race ===
==== Race results ====
Class winners in bold. Cars failing to complete 70% of winner's distance marked as Not Classified (NC).

Pos	Class	No	Team	Drivers	Chassis	Tire	Laps
Pos	Class	No	Team	Drivers	Engine	Tire	Laps
1	**LMP1**	**66**	**(United States) de Ferran Motorsports**	**(Brazil) Gil de Ferran (France) Simon Pagenaud**	**Acura ARX-02a**	M	**184**
1	**LMP1**	**66**	**(United States) de Ferran Motorsports**	**(Brazil) Gil de Ferran (France) Simon Pagenaud**	**Acura AR7 4.0 L V8**	M	**184**
2	LMP1	9	(United States) Patrón Highcroft Racing	(Australia) David Brabham (United States) Scott Sharp	Acura ARX-02a	M	184
2	LMP1	9	(United States) Patrón Highcroft Racing	(Australia) David Brabham (United States) Scott Sharp	Acura AR7 4.0 L V8	M	184
3	LMP1	48	(United States) Corsa Motorsports	(United Kingdom) Johnny Mowlem (Sweden) Stefan Johansson	Ginetta-Zytek GZ09HS	D	177
3	LMP1	48	(United States) Corsa Motorsports	(United Kingdom) Johnny Mowlem (Sweden) Stefan Johansson	Zytek ZJ458 4.5 L Hybrid V8	D	177
4	**LMP2**	**20**	**(United States) Dyson Racing Team**	**(United States) Butch Leitzinger (United Kingdom) Marino Franchitti**	**Lola B09/86**	M	**172**
4	**LMP2**	**20**	**(United States) Dyson Racing Team**	**(United States) Butch Leitzinger (United Kingdom) Marino Franchitti**	**Mazda MZR-R 2.0 L Turbo I4**	M	**172**
5	**GT2**	**45**	**(United States) Flying Lizard Motorsports**	**(United States) Patrick Long (Germany) Jörg Bergmeister**	**Porsche 997 GT3-RSR**	M	**167**
5	**GT2**	**45**	**(United States) Flying Lizard Motorsports**	**(United States) Patrick Long (Germany) Jörg Bergmeister**	**Porsche 4.0 L Flat-6**	M	**167**
6	LMP1	12	(United States) Autocon Motorsports	(Canada) Tony Burgess (United States) Chris McMurry	Lola B06/10	D	166
6	LMP1	12	(United States) Autocon Motorsports	(Canada) Tony Burgess (United States) Chris McMurry	AER P32C 4.0 L Turbo V8	D	166
7	LMP2	15	(Mexico) Lowe's Fernández Racing	(Mexico) Adrian Fernández (Mexico) Luis Díaz	Acura ARX-01B	M	166
7	LMP2	15	(Mexico) Lowe's Fernández Racing	(Mexico) Adrian Fernández (Mexico) Luis Díaz	Acura AL7R 3.4 L V8	M	166
8	GT2	62	(United States) Risi Competizione	(Brazil) Jaime Melo (Germany) Pierre Kaffer	Ferrari F430GT	M	166
8	GT2	62	(United States) Risi Competizione	(Brazil) Jaime Melo (Germany) Pierre Kaffer	Ferrari 4.0 L V8	M	166
9	GT2	90	(United States) BMW Rahal Letterman Racing	(United States) Bill Auberlen (United States) Joey Hand	BMW M3 GT2	D	166
9	GT2	90	(United States) BMW Rahal Letterman Racing	(United States) Bill Auberlen (United States) Joey Hand	BMW 4.0 L V8	D	166
10	GT2	87	(United States) Farnbacher-Loles Motorsports	(Germany) Wolf Henzler (United States) Bryce Miller	Porsche 997 GT3-RSR	M	165
10	GT2	87	(United States) Farnbacher-Loles Motorsports	(Germany) Wolf Henzler (United States) Bryce Miller	Porsche 4.0 L Flat-6	M	165
11	GT2	18	(Germany) T-Mobile VICI Racing	(Germany) Johannes Stuck (United Kingdom) Richard Westbrook	Porsche 997 GT3-RSR	M	163
11	GT2	18	(Germany) T-Mobile VICI Racing	(Germany) Johannes Stuck (United Kingdom) Richard Westbrook	Porsche 4.0 L Flat-6	M	163
12	GT2	21	(United States) Panoz Team PTG	(United Kingdom) Ian James (Germany) Dominik Farnbacher	Panoz Esperante GT-LM	Y	163
12	GT2	21	(United States) Panoz Team PTG	(United Kingdom) Ian James (Germany) Dominik Farnbacher	Ford 5.0 L V8	Y	163
13	GT2	44	(United States) Flying Lizard Motorsports	(United States) Johannes van Overbeek (United States) Seth Neiman	Porsche 997 GT3-RSR	M	159
13	GT2	44	(United States) Flying Lizard Motorsports	(United States) Johannes van Overbeek (United States) Seth Neiman	Porsche 4.0 L Flat-6	M	159
14	GT2	11	(United States) Primetime Race Group	(United States) Joel Feinberg (United Kingdom) Chris Hall	Dodge Viper Competition Coupe	Y	158
14	GT2	11	(United States) Primetime Race Group	(United States) Joel Feinberg (United Kingdom) Chris Hall	Dodge 8.3 L V10	Y	158
15	LMP2	19	(United States) van der Steur Racing	(United States) Gunnar van der Steur (United States) Adam Pecorari	Radical SR9	K	157
15	LMP2	19	(United States) van der Steur Racing	(United States) Gunnar van der Steur (United States) Adam Pecorari	AER P07 2.0 L Turbo I4	K	157
16	GT2	40	(United States) Robertson Racing	(United States) David Robertson (United States) Andrea Robertson (United States) David Murry	Ford GT-R Mk. VII	D	153
16	GT2	40	(United States) Robertson Racing	(United States) David Robertson (United States) Andrea Robertson (United States) David Murry	Ford 5.0 L V8	D	153
17	**Chal**	**36**	**(United States) Gruppe Orange**	**(United States) Wesley Hoaglund (United States) Bob Faieta**	**Porsche 997 GT3 Cup**	Y	**149**
17	**Chal**	**36**	**(United States) Gruppe Orange**	**(United States) Wesley Hoaglund (United States) Bob Faieta**	**Porsche 3.6 L Flat-6**	Y	**149**
18	Chal	08	(United States) Orbit Racing	(United States) Ed Brown (United States) Bill Sweedler	Porsche 997 GT3 Cup	Y	146
18	Chal	08	(United States) Orbit Racing	(United States) Ed Brown (United States) Bill Sweedler	Porsche 3.6 L Flat-6	Y	146
19	Chal	02	(United States) Gruppe Orange	(United States) Nick Parker (United States) Donald Pickering	Porsche 997 GT3 Cup	Y	144
19	Chal	02	(United States) Gruppe Orange	(United States) Nick Parker (United States) Donald Pickering	Porsche 3.6 L Flat-6	Y	144
20	Chal	57	(United States) Snow Racing	(United States) Martin Snow (United States) Melanie Snow	Porsche 997 GT3 Cup	Y	142
20	Chal	57	(United States) Snow Racing	(United States) Martin Snow (United States) Melanie Snow	Porsche 3.6 L Flat-6	Y	142
21	GT2	92	(United States) BMW Rahal Letterman Racing	(United States) Tommy Milner (Germany) Dirk Müller	BMW M3 GT2	D	142
21	GT2	92	(United States) BMW Rahal Letterman Racing	(United States) Tommy Milner (Germany) Dirk Müller	BMW 4.0 L V8	D	142
22 DNF	LMP1	37	(United States) Intersport Racing	(United States) Jon Field (United States) Clint Field	Lola B06/10	D	138
22 DNF	LMP1	37	(United States) Intersport Racing	(United States) Jon Field (United States) Clint Field	AER P32C 4.0 L Turbo V8	D	138
23 DNF	LMP2	16	(United States) Dyson Racing Team	(United States) Chris Dyson (United Kingdom) Guy Smith	Lola B09/86	M	63
23 DNF	LMP2	16	(United States) Dyson Racing Team	(United States) Chris Dyson (United Kingdom) Guy Smith	Mazda MZR-R 2.0 L Turbo I4	M	63
24 DNF	Chal	47	(United States) Orbit Racing	(United States) Guy Cosmo (United States) John Baker	Porsche 997 GT3 Cup	Y	52
24 DNF	Chal	47	(United States) Orbit Racing	(United States) Guy Cosmo (United States) John Baker	Porsche 3.6 L Flat-6	Y	52

American Le Mans Series
Previous race: Utah Grand Prix	2009 season	Next race: Sports Car Challenge of Mid-Ohio
