= 2009 Utah Grand Prix =

Track map of Miller Motorsports Park outer circuit

The 2009 Larry H. Miller Dealerships Utah Grand Prix presented by the Grand and Little America Hotels was the fourth round of the 2009 American Le Mans Series season. It took place at the Miller Motorsports Park, Utah on May 17, 2009. The race featured the debut of a new category of vehicles for the American Le Mans Series known as the ALMS Challenge, featuring Porsche 997 GT3 Cup cars from the IMSA GT3 Cup Challenge.

== Report ==
=== Qualifying ===
==== Qualifying result ====
Pole position winners in each class are marked in bold.

Pos	Class	Team	Qualifying Driver	Lap Time
1	**LMP1**	**#66 de Ferran Motorsports**	**Simon Pagenaud**	**1:30.645**
2	LMP1	#9 Patrón Highcroft Racing	David Brabham	1:31.381
3	**LMP2**	**#15 Lowe's Fernandez Racing**	**Luis Diaz**	**1:32.749**
4	LMP2	#20 Dyson Racing	Butch Leitzinger	1:33.513
5	LMP2	#16 Dyson Racing	Chris Dyson	1:33.685
6	LMP1	#48 Corsa Motorsports	Johnny Mowlem	1:34.957
7	LMP1	#37 Intersport Racing	Jon Field	1:35.471
8	LMP1	#12 Autocon Motorsports	Michael Lewis	1:36.401
9	**GT2**	**#45 Flying Lizard Motorsports**	**Jörg Bergmeister**	**1:47.120**
10	GT2	#62 Risi Competizione	Jaime Melo	1:47.265
11	GT2	#87 Farnbacher-Loles Motorsports	Wolf Henzler	1:47.319
12	GT2	#92 BMW Rahal Letterman Racing	Dirk Müller	1:48.314
13	GT2	#18 T-Mobile VICI Racing	Nicky Pastorelli	1:48.599
14	GT2	#90 BMW Rahal Letterman Racing	Joey Hand	1:48.628
15	GT2	#21 Panoz Team PTG	Dominik Farnbacher	1:49.084
16	GT2	#40 Robertson Racing	David Murry	1:49.888
17	GT2	#44 Flying Lizard Motorsports	Seth Neiman	1:52.709
18	GT2	#11 Primetime Race Group	Joel Feinberg	1:53.032
19	**Chal**	**#02 Gruppe Orange**	**Carl Skerlong**	**1:56.166**
20	Chal	#57 Snow Racing	Martin Snow	1:56.172
21	Chal	#36 Gruppe Orange	Bob Faieta	1:56.248
22	Chal	#08 Orbit Racing	Bill Sweedler	1:57.500
23	Chal	#47 Orbit Racing	John Baker	2:00.085

=== Race ===
The team of de Ferran Motorsport won their second straight ALMS race at the track where the team made their debut in 2008. Lowe's Fernández Racing continued their sweep of the LMP2 category with another victory, but led the #20 Dyson Racing entry across the finish line by less than six tenths of a second. Flying Lizard Motorsports also continued their winning ways with their third straight victory on the season, leading the fellow Porsche of Farnbacher-Loles. The partnership of Martin and Melanie Snow won the inaugural ALMS Challenge race, thanks in part to the disqualification of the two Orbit Racing entries for an illegal ride height.

==== Race result ====
Class winners in bold. Cars failing to complete 70% of winner's distance marked as Not Classified (NC).

Pos	Class	No	Team	Drivers	Chassis	Tire	Laps
Pos	Class	No	Team	Drivers	Engine	Tire	Laps
1	**LMP1**	**66**	**(United States) de Ferran Motorsports**	**(Brazil) Gil de Ferran (France) Simon Pagenaud**	**Acura ARX-02a**	MI	**103**
1	**LMP1**	**66**	**(United States) de Ferran Motorsports**	**(Brazil) Gil de Ferran (France) Simon Pagenaud**	**Acura AR7 4.0 L V8**	MI	**103**
2	LMP1	9	(United States) Patrón Highcroft Racing	(United States) Scott Sharp (Australia) David Brabham	Acura ARX-02a	MI	103
2	LMP1	9	(United States) Patrón Highcroft Racing	(United States) Scott Sharp (Australia) David Brabham	Acura AR7 4.0 L V8	MI	103
3	**LMP2**	**15**	**(Mexico) Lowe's Fernández Racing**	**(Mexico) Luis Díaz (Mexico) Adrian Fernández**	**Acura ARX-01B**	MI	**100**
3	**LMP2**	**15**	**(Mexico) Lowe's Fernández Racing**	**(Mexico) Luis Díaz (Mexico) Adrian Fernández**	**Acura AL7R 3.4 L V8**	MI	**100**
4	LMP2	20	(United States) Dyson Racing	(United Kingdom) Marino Franchitti (United States) Butch Leitzinger	Lola B08/86	MI	100
4	LMP2	20	(United States) Dyson Racing	(United Kingdom) Marino Franchitti (United States) Butch Leitzinger	Mazda MZR-R 2.0 L Turbo I4	MI	100
5	LMP1	37	(United States) Intersport Racing	(United States) Jon Field (United States) Clint Field (United States) Chapman Ducote	Lola B06/10	D	93
5	LMP1	37	(United States) Intersport Racing	(United States) Jon Field (United States) Clint Field (United States) Chapman Ducote	AER P32C 4.0 L Turbo V8	D	93
6	LMP2	16	(United States) Dyson Racing	(United States) Chris Dyson (United Kingdom) Guy Smith	Lola B09/86	MI	92
6	LMP2	16	(United States) Dyson Racing	(United States) Chris Dyson (United Kingdom) Guy Smith	Mazda MZR-R 2.0 L Turbo I4	MI	92
7	**GT2**	**45**	**(United States) Flying Lizard Motorsports**	**(Germany) Jörg Bergmeister (United States) Patrick Long**	**Porsche 997 GT3-RSR**	MI	**90**
7	**GT2**	**45**	**(United States) Flying Lizard Motorsports**	**(Germany) Jörg Bergmeister (United States) Patrick Long**	**Porsche 4.0 L Flat-6**	MI	**90**
8	GT2	87	(United States) Farnbacher-Loles Motorsports	(Germany) Marc Lieb (Germany) Wolf Henzler	Porsche 997 GT3-RSR	MI	90
8	GT2	87	(United States) Farnbacher-Loles Motorsports	(Germany) Marc Lieb (Germany) Wolf Henzler	Porsche 4.0 L Flat-6	MI	90
9	GT2	62	(United States) Risi Competizione	(Germany) Pierre Kaffer (Brazil) Jaime Melo	Ferrari F430 GT	MI	89
9	GT2	62	(United States) Risi Competizione	(Germany) Pierre Kaffer (Brazil) Jaime Melo	Ferrari 4.0 L V8	MI	89
10	GT2	21	(United States) Panoz Team PTG	(United States) Ian James (Germany) Dominik Farnbacher	Panoz Esperante GT-LM	Y	89
10	GT2	21	(United States) Panoz Team PTG	(United States) Ian James (Germany) Dominik Farnbacher	Ford 5.0 L V8	Y	89
11	GT2	18	(Germany) T-Mobile VICI Racing	(Netherlands) Nicky Pastorelli (Germany) Johannes Stuck	Porsche 997 GT3-RSR	MI	88
11	GT2	18	(Germany) T-Mobile VICI Racing	(Netherlands) Nicky Pastorelli (Germany) Johannes Stuck	Porsche 4.0 L Flat-6	MI	88
12	GT2	44	(United States) Flying Lizard Motorsports	(United States) Johannes van Overbeek (United States) Seth Neiman	Porsche 997 GT3-RSR	MI	87
12	GT2	44	(United States) Flying Lizard Motorsports	(United States) Johannes van Overbeek (United States) Seth Neiman	Porsche 4.0 L Flat-6	MI	87
13	LMP1	48	(United States) Corsa Motorsports	(United Kingdom) Johnny Mowlem (Sweden) Stefan Johansson	Ginetta-Zytek GZ09HS	MI	87
13	LMP1	48	(United States) Corsa Motorsports	(United Kingdom) Johnny Mowlem (Sweden) Stefan Johansson	Zytek ZJ458 4.5 L V8	MI	87
14	GT2	92	(United States) BMW Rahal Letterman Racing	(United States) Tommy Milner (Germany) Dirk Müller	BMW M3 GT2	D	85
14	GT2	92	(United States) BMW Rahal Letterman Racing	(United States) Tommy Milner (Germany) Dirk Müller	BMW 4.0 L V8	D	85
15	GT2	90	(United States) BMW Rahal Letterman Racing	(United States) Bill Auberlen (United States) Joey Hand	BMW M3 GT2	D	83
15	GT2	90	(United States) BMW Rahal Letterman Racing	(United States) Bill Auberlen (United States) Joey Hand	BMW 4.0 L V8	D	83
16 DNF	GT2	11	(United States) Primetime Race Group	(United Kingdom) Chris Hall (United States) Joel Feinberg	Dodge Viper Competition Coupe	D	82
16 DNF	GT2	11	(United States) Primetime Race Group	(United Kingdom) Chris Hall (United States) Joel Feinberg	Dodge 8.3 L V10	D	82
17	**Chal**	**57**	**(United States) Snow Racing**	**(United States) Melanie Snow (United States) Martin Snow**	**Porsche 997 GT3 Cup**	Y	**82**
17	**Chal**	**57**	**(United States) Snow Racing**	**(United States) Melanie Snow (United States) Martin Snow**	**Porsche 3.6 L Flat-6**	Y	**82**
18	GT2	40	(United States) Robertson Racing	(United States) David Murry (United States) Andrea Robertson (United States) David Robertson	Ford GT-R Mk. VII	D	81
18	GT2	40	(United States) Robertson Racing	(United States) David Murry (United States) Andrea Robertson (United States) David Robertson	Ford 5.0 L V8	D	81
19 DNF	Chal	02	(United States) Gruppe Orange	(United States) Carl Skerlong (United States) Nick Parker	Porsche 997 GT3 Cup	Y	57
19 DNF	Chal	02	(United States) Gruppe Orange	(United States) Carl Skerlong (United States) Nick Parker	Porsche 3.6 L Flat-6	Y	57
20 DNF	LMP1	12	(United States) Autocon Motorsports	(United States) Michael Lewis (United States) Bryan Willman	Lola B06/10	D	40
20 DNF	LMP1	12	(United States) Autocon Motorsports	(United States) Michael Lewis (United States) Bryan Willman	AER P32C 4.0 L Turbo V8	D	40
21 DNF	Chal	36	(United States) Gruppe Orange	(United States) Bob Faieta (United States) Wesley Hoaglund	Porsche 997 GT3 Cup	Y	37
21 DNF	Chal	36	(United States) Gruppe Orange	(United States) Bob Faieta (United States) Wesley Hoaglund	Porsche 3.6 L Flat-6	Y	37
DSQ	Chal	47	(United States) Orbit Racing	(United States) Jon Baker (United States) Guy Cosmo	Porsche 997 GT3 Cup	Y	82
DSQ	Chal	47	(United States) Orbit Racing	(United States) Jon Baker (United States) Guy Cosmo	Porsche 3.6 L Flat-6	Y	82
DSQ	Chal	08	(United States) Orbit Racing	(United States) Ed Brown (United States) Bill Sweedler	Porsche 997 GT3 Cup	Y	80
DSQ	Chal	08	(United States) Orbit Racing	(United States) Ed Brown (United States) Bill Sweedler	Porsche 3.6 L Flat-6	Y	80

American Le Mans Series
Previous race: ALMS at Long Beach	2009 season	Next race: Northeast Grand Prix
