= 2009 Sports Car Challenge of St. Petersburg =

St. Petersburg Street Circuit

The 2009 Acura Sports Car Challenge of St. Petersburg was the second round of the 2009 American Le Mans Series season. It took place at the Streets of St. Petersburg, Florida on April 4, 2009. The Acura ARX-02a earned its first overall victory under the Patrón Highcroft Racing team after early leader de Ferran Motorsports suffered mechanical issues. Acura also won the LMP2 category with Lowe's Fernández Racing, while GT2 was won by the Porsche of Flying Lizard Motorsports.

== Report ==
=== Qualifying ===
In qualifying solely for the GT2 category, due to the lack of GT1 class competitors for this event, Jaime Melo in the Risi Competizione Ferrari led the pack before a red flag stopped the session due to an incident involving eventual fifth place qualifier Patrick Long in the Flying Lizard Motorsports Porsche. Farnbacher-Loles and the two BMWs completed the top of the GT2 grid.

In prototype qualifying the Acura of Simon Pagenaud dominated by earning de Ferran Motorsports a pole position by nearly a second over the other Acura of Patrón Highcroft Racing. Acura also led the LMP2 category as the Lowe's Fernández Racing car was piloted by Luis Díaz to third overall, beating the closest Dyson Lola-Mazda by three tenths of a second.

==== Qualifying result ====
Pole position winners in each class are marked in bold.

Pos	Class	Team	Qualifying Driver	Lap Time
1	**LMP1**	**#66 de Ferran Motorsports**	**Simon Pagenaud**	**1:03.776**
2	LMP1	#9 Patrón Highcroft Racing	Scott Sharp	1:04.722
3	**LMP2**	**#15 Lowe's Fernández Racing**	**Luis Díaz**	**1:05.178**
4	LMP2	#16 Dyson Racing Team	Guy Smith	1:05.464
5	LMP2	#20 Dyson Racing Team	Marino Franchitti	1:05.666
6	LMP1	#37 Intersport Racing	Chapman Ducote	1:09.044
7	**GT2**	**#61 Risi Competizione**	**Jaime Melo**	**1:12.892**
8	GT2	#87 Farnbacher-Loles Racing	Wolf Henzler	1:13.173
9	GT2	#90 BMW Rahal Letterman Racing	Joey Hand	1:13.267
10	GT2	#92 BMW Rahal Letterman Racing	Dirk Müller	1:13.458
11	GT2	#45 Flying Lizard Motorsports	Patrick Long	1:13.465
12	GT2	#21 Panoz Team PTG	Dominik Farnbacher	1:14.109
13	GT2	#40 Robertson Racing	David Murry	1:14.281
14	GT2	#28 LG Motorsports	Eric Curran	1:14.633
15	GT2	#11 Primetime Race Group	Joel Feinberg	1:15.938
16	GT2	#22 Panoz Team PTG	Tom Sutherland	1:15.996
17	GT2	#44 Flying Lizard Motorsports	Seth Neiman	1:18.592

=== Race ===
==== Race result ====
Class winners in bold. Cars failing to complete 70% of winner's distance marked as Not Classified (NC).

Pos	Class	No	Team	Drivers	Chassis	Tire	Laps
Pos	Class	No	Team	Drivers	Engine	Tire	Laps
1	**LMP1**	**9**	**(United States) Patrón Highcroft Racing**	**(Australia) David Brabham (United States) Scott Sharp**	**Acura ARX-02a**	MI	**93**
1	**LMP1**	**9**	**(United States) Patrón Highcroft Racing**	**(Australia) David Brabham (United States) Scott Sharp**	**Acura AR7 4.0 L V8**	MI	**93**
2	**LMP2**	**15**	**(Mexico) Lowe's Fernández Racing**	**(Mexico) Adrian Fernández (Mexico) Luis Díaz**	**Acura ARX-01B**	MI	**93**
2	**LMP2**	**15**	**(Mexico) Lowe's Fernández Racing**	**(Mexico) Adrian Fernández (Mexico) Luis Díaz**	**Acura AL7R 3.4 L V8**	MI	**93**
3	LMP2	16	(United States) Dyson Racing Team	(United States) Chris Dyson (United Kingdom) Guy Smith	Lola B09/86	MI	92
3	LMP2	16	(United States) Dyson Racing Team	(United States) Chris Dyson (United Kingdom) Guy Smith	Mazda MZR-R 2.0 L Turbo I4	MI	92
4	LMP2	20	(United States) Dyson Racing Team	(United States) Butch Leitzinger (United Kingdom) Marino Franchitti	Lola B08/86	MI	91
4	LMP2	20	(United States) Dyson Racing Team	(United States) Butch Leitzinger (United Kingdom) Marino Franchitti	Mazda MZR-R 2.0 L Turbo I4	MI	91
5	**GT2**	**45**	**(United States) Flying Lizard Motorsports**	**(United States) Patrick Long (Germany) Jörg Bergmeister**	**Porsche 997 GT3-RSR**	MI	**88**
5	**GT2**	**45**	**(United States) Flying Lizard Motorsports**	**(United States) Patrick Long (Germany) Jörg Bergmeister**	**Porsche 4.0 L Flat-6**	MI	**88**
6	LMP1	37	(United States) Intersport Racing	(United States) Jon Field (United States) Clint Field (United States) Chapman Ducote	Lola B06/10	D	88
6	LMP1	37	(United States) Intersport Racing	(United States) Jon Field (United States) Clint Field (United States) Chapman Ducote	AER P32C 4.0 L Turbo V8	D	88
7	GT2	92	(United States) BMW Rahal Letterman Racing	(United States) Tommy Milner (Germany) Dirk Müller	BMW M3 GT2	D	86
7	GT2	92	(United States) BMW Rahal Letterman Racing	(United States) Tommy Milner (Germany) Dirk Müller	BMW 4.0 L V8	D	86
8	GT2	21	(United States) Panoz Team PTG	(United Kingdom) Ian James (Germany) Dominik Farnbacher	Panoz Esperante GT-LM	Y	86
8	GT2	21	(United States) Panoz Team PTG	(United Kingdom) Ian James (Germany) Dominik Farnbacher	Ford 5.0 L V8	Y	86
9	GT2	28	(United States) LG Motorsports	(United States) Lou Giglotti (United States) Eric Curran	Chevrolet Corvette C6	D	85
9	GT2	28	(United States) LG Motorsports	(United States) Lou Giglotti (United States) Eric Curran	Chevrolet LS3 6.3 L V8	D	85
10	GT2	44	(United States) Flying Lizard Motorsports	(United States) Darren Law (United States) Seth Neiman	Porsche 997 GT3-RSR	MI	84
10	GT2	44	(United States) Flying Lizard Motorsports	(United States) Darren Law (United States) Seth Neiman	Porsche 4.0 L Flat-6	MI	84
11	GT2	40	(United States) Robertson Racing	(United States) David Robertson (United States) Andrea Robertson (United States) David Murry	Ford GT-R Mk. VII	D	83
11	GT2	40	(United States) Robertson Racing	(United States) David Robertson (United States) Andrea Robertson (United States) David Murry	Ford 5.0 L V8	D	83
12	GT2	87	(United States) Farnbacher-Loles Motorsports	(Germany) Wolf Henzler (Germany) Dirk Werner	Porsche 997 GT3-RSR	MI	74
12	GT2	87	(United States) Farnbacher-Loles Motorsports	(Germany) Wolf Henzler (Germany) Dirk Werner	Porsche 4.0 L Flat-6	MI	74
13 DNF	LMP1	66	(United States) de Ferran Motorsports	(Brazil) Gil de Ferran (France) Simon Pagenaud	Acura ARX-02a	MI	66
13 DNF	LMP1	66	(United States) de Ferran Motorsports	(Brazil) Gil de Ferran (France) Simon Pagenaud	Acura AR7 4.0 L V8	MI	66
14 DNF	GT2	11	(United States) Primetime Race Group	(United States) Joel Feinberg (United Kingdom) Chris Hall	Dodge Viper Competition Coupe	D	38
14 DNF	GT2	11	(United States) Primetime Race Group	(United States) Joel Feinberg (United Kingdom) Chris Hall	Dodge 8.3 L V10	D	38
15 DNF	GT2	22	(United States) Panoz Team PTG	(United States) Tom Sutherland (United States) Ryan Phinny	Panoz Esperante GT-LM	Y	38
15 DNF	GT2	22	(United States) Panoz Team PTG	(United States) Tom Sutherland (United States) Ryan Phinny	Ford 5.0 L V8	Y	38
16 DNF	GT2	90	(United States) BMW Rahal Letterman Racing	(United States) Bill Auberlen (United States) Joey Hand	BMW M3 GT2	D	28
16 DNF	GT2	90	(United States) BMW Rahal Letterman Racing	(United States) Bill Auberlen (United States) Joey Hand	BMW 4.0 L V8	D	28
17 DNF	GT2	62	(United States) Risi Competizione	(Brazil) Jaime Melo (Germany) Pierre Kaffer	Ferrari F430GT	MI	27
17 DNF	GT2	62	(United States) Risi Competizione	(Brazil) Jaime Melo (Germany) Pierre Kaffer	Ferrari 4.0 L V8	MI	27

American Le Mans Series
Previous race: 12 Hours of Sebring	2009 season	Next race: American Le Mans Series at Long Beach
