= 2009 American Le Mans Series at Long Beach =

2009 motor race at Long Beach California

Long Beach Street Circuit

The 2009 Tequila Patrón American Le Mans Series at Long Beach was the third round of the 2009 American Le Mans Series season. It took place at the Long Beach Street Circuit, California on April 18, 2009.

The de Ferran Motorsports Acura team earned their first victory in the series, leading the Highcroft Racing Acura to the finish. Fernández Racing Acura also won the LMP2 category for their third straight race while the #4 Chevrolet Corvette of Oliver Gavin and Olivier Beretta won Corvette Racing's final appearance in the GT1 category in the American Le Mans Series. Flying Lizard Motorsports won their second straight GT2 class victory after early leader Farnbacher-Loles suffered a suspension failure on circuit.

== Report ==
=== Qualifying ===
==== Qualifying result ====
Pole position winners in each class are marked in bold.

Pos	Class	Team	Qualifying Driver	Lap Time
1	**LMP1**	**#9 Patrón Highcroft Racing**	**David Brabham**	**1:11.627**
2	LMP1	#66 de Ferran Motorsports	Gil de Ferran	1:11.699
3	**LMP2**	**#15 Lowe's Fernández Racing**	**Adrian Fernández**	**1:13.134**
4	LMP2	#16 Dyson Racing Team	Guy Smith	1:13.378
5	LMP2	#20 Dyson Racing Team	Butch Leitzinger	1:13.763
6	LMP1	#37 Intersport Racing	John Field	1:15.303
7	LMP1	#12 Autocon Motorsports	Michael Lewis	1:16.470
8	**GT1**	**#4 Corvette Racing**	**Olivier Beretta**	**1:17.952**
9	GT1	#3 Corvette Racing	Johnny O'Connell	1:18.144
10	**GT2**	**#87 Farnbacher-Loles Racing**	**Wolf Henzler**	**1:20.368**
11	GT2	#45 Flying Lizard Motorsports	Patrick Long	1:20.577
12	GT2	#92 BMW Rahal Letterman Racing	Dirk Müller	1:21.300
13	GT2	#90 BMW Rahal Letterman Racing	Joey Hand	1:21.382
14	GT2	#18 VICI Racing	Richard Westbrook	1:21.805
15	GT2	#40 Robertson Racing	David Murry	1:22.044
16	GT2	#17 Team Falken Tire	Bryan Sellers	1:22.222
17	GT2	#28 LG Motorsports	Boris Said	1:22.334
18	GT2	#11 Primetime Race Group	Chris Hall	1:22.519
19	GT2	#44 Flying Lizard Motorsports	Seth Neiman	1:25.023
20	GT2	#21 Panoz Team PTG	Dominik Farnbacher	1:25.096
–	GT2	#62 Risi Competizione	Jaime Melo	1:20.111^{†}

† – The #62 Risi Competizione Ferrari's times were not allowed as the car failed post-qualifying inspection due to being below the minimum ride height.

=== Race ===
==== Race results ====
Class winners in bold. Cars failing to complete 70% of winner's distance marked as Not Classified (NC).

Pos	Class	No	Team	Drivers	Chassis	Tire	Laps
Pos	Class	No	Team	Drivers	Engine	Tire	Laps
1	**LMP1**	**66**	**(United States) de Ferran Motorsports**	**(Brazil) Gil de Ferran (France) Simon Pagenaud**	**Acura ARX-02a**	M	**76**
1	**LMP1**	**66**	**(United States) de Ferran Motorsports**	**(Brazil) Gil de Ferran (France) Simon Pagenaud**	**Acura AR7 4.0 L V8**	M	**76**
2	LMP1	9	(United States) Patrón Highcroft Racing	(Australia) David Brabham (United States) Scott Sharp	Acura ARX-02a	M	76
2	LMP1	9	(United States) Patrón Highcroft Racing	(Australia) David Brabham (United States) Scott Sharp	Acura AR7 4.0 L V8	M	76
3	**LMP2**	**15**	**(Mexico) Lowe's Fernández Racing**	**(Mexico) Adrian Fernández (Mexico) Luis Díaz**	**Acura ARX-01B**	M	**75**
3	**LMP2**	**15**	**(Mexico) Lowe's Fernández Racing**	**(Mexico) Adrian Fernández (Mexico) Luis Díaz**	**Acura AL7R 3.4 L V8**	M	**75**
4	LMP2	16	(United States) Dyson Racing Team	(United States) Chris Dyson (United Kingdom) Guy Smith	Lola B09/86	M	75
4	LMP2	16	(United States) Dyson Racing Team	(United States) Chris Dyson (United Kingdom) Guy Smith	Mazda MZR-R 2.0 L Turbo I4	M	75
5	LMP2	20	(United States) Dyson Racing Team	(United States) Butch Leitzinger (United Kingdom) Marino Franchitti	Lola B08/86	M	74
5	LMP2	20	(United States) Dyson Racing Team	(United States) Butch Leitzinger (United Kingdom) Marino Franchitti	Mazda MZR-R 2.0 L Turbo I4	M	74
6	**GT1**	**4**	**(United States) Corvette Racing**	**(United Kingdom) Oliver Gavin (Monaco) Olivier Beretta**	**Chevrolet Corvette C6.R**	M	**73**
6	**GT1**	**4**	**(United States) Corvette Racing**	**(United Kingdom) Oliver Gavin (Monaco) Olivier Beretta**	**Chevrolet LS7.R 7.0 L V8**	M	**73**
7	LMP1	37	(United States) Intersport Racing	(United States) Jon Field (United States) Clint Field (United States) Chapman Ducote	Lola B06/10	D	71
7	LMP1	37	(United States) Intersport Racing	(United States) Jon Field (United States) Clint Field (United States) Chapman Ducote	AER P32C 4.0 L Turbo V8	D	71
8	**GT2**	**45**	**(United States) Flying Lizard Motorsports**	**(United States) Patrick Long (Germany) Jörg Bergmeister**	**Porsche 997 GT3-RSR**	M	**71**
8	**GT2**	**45**	**(United States) Flying Lizard Motorsports**	**(United States) Patrick Long (Germany) Jörg Bergmeister**	**Porsche 4.0 L Flat-6**	M	**71**
9	GT2	62	(United States) Risi Competizione	(Brazil) Jaime Melo (Germany) Pierre Kaffer	Ferrari F430GT	M	71
9	GT2	62	(United States) Risi Competizione	(Brazil) Jaime Melo (Germany) Pierre Kaffer	Ferrari 4.0 L V8	M	71
10	GT2	92	(United States) BMW Rahal Letterman Racing	(United States) Tommy Milner (Germany) Dirk Müller	BMW M3 GT2	D	70
10	GT2	92	(United States) BMW Rahal Letterman Racing	(United States) Tommy Milner (Germany) Dirk Müller	BMW 4.0 L V8	D	70
11	GT2	18	(Germany) T-Mobile VICI Racing	(United Kingdom) Richard Westbrook (Germany) Johannes Stuck	Porsche 997 GT3-RSR	M	70
11	GT2	18	(Germany) T-Mobile VICI Racing	(United Kingdom) Richard Westbrook (Germany) Johannes Stuck	Porsche 4.0 L Flat-6	M	70
12	GT2	44	(United States) Flying Lizard Motorsports	(United States) Darren Law (United States) Seth Neiman	Porsche 997 GT3-RSR	M	70
12	GT2	44	(United States) Flying Lizard Motorsports	(United States) Darren Law (United States) Seth Neiman	Porsche 4.0 L Flat-6	M	70
13	GT2	21	(United States) Panoz Team PTG	(United Kingdom) Ian James (Germany) Dominik Farnbacher	Panoz Esperante GT-LM	Y	69
13	GT2	21	(United States) Panoz Team PTG	(United Kingdom) Ian James (Germany) Dominik Farnbacher	Ford 5.0 L V8	Y	69
14	GT2	11	(United States) Primetime Race Group	(United States) Joel Feinberg (United Kingdom) Chris Hall	Dodge Viper Competition Coupe	D	68
14	GT2	11	(United States) Primetime Race Group	(United States) Joel Feinberg (United Kingdom) Chris Hall	Dodge 8.3 L V10	D	68
15	LMP1	12	(United States) Autocon Motorsports	(United States) Michael Lewis (United States) Bryan Willman	Lola B06/10	D	67
15	LMP1	12	(United States) Autocon Motorsports	(United States) Michael Lewis (United States) Bryan Willman	AER P32C 4.0 L Turbo V8	D	67
16	GT2	90	(United States) BMW Rahal Letterman Racing	(United States) Bill Auberlen (United States) Joey Hand	BMW M3 GT2	D	67
16	GT2	90	(United States) BMW Rahal Letterman Racing	(United States) Bill Auberlen (United States) Joey Hand	BMW 4.0 L V8	D	67
17	GT2	40	(United States) Robertson Racing	(United States) David Robertson (United States) David Murry	Ford GT-R Mk. VII	D	67
17	GT2	40	(United States) Robertson Racing	(United States) David Robertson (United States) David Murry	Ford 5.0 L V8	D	67
18	GT2	87	(United States) Farnbacher-Loles Motorsports	(Germany) Wolf Henzler (Germany) Dirk Werner	Porsche 997 GT3-RSR	M	67
18	GT2	87	(United States) Farnbacher-Loles Motorsports	(Germany) Wolf Henzler (Germany) Dirk Werner	Porsche 4.0 L Flat-6	M	67
19 DNF	GT2	28	(United States) LG Motorsports	(United States) Lou Giglotti (United States) Boris Said	Chevrolet Corvette C6	Y	64
19 DNF	GT2	28	(United States) LG Motorsports	(United States) Lou Giglotti (United States) Boris Said	Chevrolet LS3 6.3 L V8	Y	64
20 DNF	GT2	17	(United States) Team Falken Tire (United States) Landmark Motorsports	(United States) Bryan Sellers (United States) Dominic Cicero	Porsche 997 GT3-RSR	F	43
20 DNF	GT2	17	(United States) Team Falken Tire (United States) Landmark Motorsports	(United States) Bryan Sellers (United States) Dominic Cicero	Porsche 4.0 L Flat-6	F	43
21 DNF	GT1	3	(United States) Corvette Racing	(United States) Johnny O'Connell (Denmark) Jan Magnussen	Chevrolet Corvette C6.R	M	42
21 DNF	GT1	3	(United States) Corvette Racing	(United States) Johnny O'Connell (Denmark) Jan Magnussen	Chevrolet LS7.R 7.0 L V8	M	42

American Le Mans Series
Previous race: Sports Car Challenge of St. Petersburg	2009 season	Next race: Utah Grand Prix
