= 2009 Monterey Sports Car Championships =

2009 motor race at Laguna Seca

Track map of Mazda Raceway Laguna Seca

The 2009 Monterey Sports Car Championships presented by Patrón was the tenth and final round of the 2009 American Le Mans Series season. It took place at Mazda Raceway Laguna Seca, Monterey, California on October 11, 2009. The race was won by the Acura of de Ferran Motorsports, driven by Simon Pagenaud and retiring driver Gil de Ferran, which wore a tribute livery based on Jim Hall's Chaparrals. Adrian Fernández and Luis Díaz won the LMP2 category in the Fernández Racing Acura while only six tenths of a second behind the overall winning de Ferran car. The GT2 class was won by the #45 Flying Lizard Motorsports Porsche after contact with the #3 Corvette Racing while approaching the finish line on the final lap. Guy Cosmo and John Baker of Orbit Racing won their first race in the ALMS Challenge category after the Velox Motorsport entry was disqualified.

== Qualifying result ==
Pole position winners in each class are marked in bold.

Pos	Class	Team	Qualifying Driver	Lap Time
1	**LMP1**	**#66 de Ferran Motorsports**	**Gil de Ferran**	**1:11.206**
2	LMP1	#9 Patrón Highcroft Racing	David Brabham	1:11.298
3	**LMP2**	**#15 Lowe's Fernández Racing**	**Luis Díaz**	**1:11.310**
4	LMP2	#20 Dyson Racing Team	Butch Leitzinger	1:12.051
5	LMP1	#88 Drayson Racing	Jonny Cocker	1:12.745
6	LMP1	#48 Corsa Motorsports	Johnny Mowlem	1:13.238
7	LMP2	#6 Team Cytosport	Klaus Graf	1:14.492
8	LMP1	#37 Intersport Racing	Jon Field	1:14.661
9	LMP1	#12 Autocon Motorsports	Chris McMurry	1:15.861
10	**GT2**	**#3 Corvette Racing**	**Jan Magnussen**	**1:23.053**
11	GT2	#62 Risi Competizione	Pierre Kaffer	1:23.220
12	GT2	#4 Corvette Racing	Oliver Gavin	1:23.283
13	GT2	#87 Farnbacher-Loles Motorsports	Wolf Henzler	1:23.347
14	GT2	#45 Flying Lizard Motorsports	Jörg Bergmeister	1:23.391
15	GT2	#90 BMW Rahal Letterman Racing	Bill Auberlen	1:23.552
16	GT2	#21 Panoz Team PTG	Dominik Farnbacher	1:23.640
17	GT2	#92 BMW Rahal Letterman Racing	Tommy Milner	1:23.745
18	GT2	#28 LG Motorsports	Tom Sutherland	1:23.991
19	GT2	#40 Robertson Racing	David Murry	1:23.993
20	GT2	#18 T-Mobile VICI Racing	Richard Westbrook	1:24.307
21	GT2	#17 Team Falken Tire	Bryan Sellers	1:25.455
22	GT2	#44 Flying Lizard Motorsports	Seth Neiman	1:28.798
23	**Chal**	**#47 Orbit Racing**	**Guy Cosmo**	**1:29.546**
24	Chal	#05 GMG Racing	James Sofronas	1:29.755
25	Chal	#69 P7 Racing	Galen Bieker	1:29.844
26	Chal	#36 Gruppe Orange	Bob Faieta	1:29.887
27	Chal	#38 Velox Motorsport	Shane Lewis	1:29.916
28	Chal	#57 Snow Racing	Martin Snow	1:30.147
29	Chal	#08 Orbit Racing	Bill Sweedler	1:30.481
30	Chal	#02 Gruppe Orange	Donald Pickering	1:31.509
31	LMP1	#10 ECO Racing	Did not participate	
32	GT2	#33 RSR	Did not participate	
33	UNC	#16 Dyson Racing Team	Did not participate	

== Race result ==
Class winners are marked in bold. Cars failing to complete 70% of winner's distance are marked as Not classified (NC).

Pos	Class	No	Team	Drivers	Chassis	Tire	Laps
Pos	Class	No	Team	Drivers	Engine	Tire	Laps
1	**LMP1**	**66**	**(United States) de Ferran Motorsports**	**(Brazil) Gil de Ferran (France) Simon Pagenaud**	**Acura ARX-02a**	M	**168**
1	**LMP1**	**66**	**(United States) de Ferran Motorsports**	**(Brazil) Gil de Ferran (France) Simon Pagenaud**	**Acura AR7 4.0 L V8**	M	**168**
2	**LMP2**	**15**	**(Mexico) Lowe's Fernández Racing**	**(Mexico) Adrian Fernández (Mexico) Luis Díaz**	**Acura ARX-01B**	M	**168**
2	**LMP2**	**15**	**(Mexico) Lowe's Fernández Racing**	**(Mexico) Adrian Fernández (Mexico) Luis Díaz**	**Acura AL7R 3.4 L V8**	M	**168**
3	LMP1	9	(United States) Patrón Highcroft Racing	(Australia) David Brabham (United States) Scott Sharp	Acura ARX-02a	M	164
3	LMP1	9	(United States) Patrón Highcroft Racing	(Australia) David Brabham (United States) Scott Sharp	Acura AR7 4.0 L V8	M	164
4	LMP1	12	(United States) Autocon Motorsports	(United States) Bryan Willman (United States) Chris McMurry (Canada) Tony Burgess	Lola B06/10	D	159
4	LMP1	12	(United States) Autocon Motorsports	(United States) Bryan Willman (United States) Chris McMurry (Canada) Tony Burgess	AER P32C 4.0 L Turbo V8	D	159
5	LMP1	48	(United States) Corsa Motorsports	(United Kingdom) Johnny Mowlem (Sweden) Stefan Johansson	Ginetta-Zytek GZ09HS	D	158
5	LMP1	48	(United States) Corsa Motorsports	(United Kingdom) Johnny Mowlem (Sweden) Stefan Johansson	Zytek ZJ458 4.5 L Hybrid V8	D	158
6	**GT2**	**45**	**(United States) Flying Lizard Motorsports**	**(United States) Patrick Long (Germany) Jörg Bergmeister**	**Porsche 997 GT3-RSR**	M	**155**
6	**GT2**	**45**	**(United States) Flying Lizard Motorsports**	**(United States) Patrick Long (Germany) Jörg Bergmeister**	**Porsche 4.0 L Flat-6**	M	**155**
7	GT2	3	(United States) Corvette Racing	(United States) Johnny O'Connell (Denmark) Jan Magnussen	Chevrolet Corvette C6.R	M	155
7	GT2	3	(United States) Corvette Racing	(United States) Johnny O'Connell (Denmark) Jan Magnussen	Chevrolet 6.0 L V8	M	155
8	GT2	87	(United States) Farnbacher-Loles Motorsports	(Germany) Wolf Henzler (Germany) Pierre Ehret	Porsche 997 GT3-RSR	M	154
8	GT2	87	(United States) Farnbacher-Loles Motorsports	(Germany) Wolf Henzler (Germany) Pierre Ehret	Porsche 4.0 L Flat-6	M	154
9	GT2	21	(United States) Panoz Team PTG	(United Kingdom) Ian James (Germany) Dominik Farnbacher	Panoz Esperante GT-LM	Y	154
9	GT2	21	(United States) Panoz Team PTG	(United Kingdom) Ian James (Germany) Dominik Farnbacher	Ford 5.0 L V8	Y	154
10	GT2	44	(United States) Flying Lizard Motorsports	(United States) Seth Neiman (United States) Johannes van Overbeek	Porsche 997 GT3-RSR	M	153
10	GT2	44	(United States) Flying Lizard Motorsports	(United States) Seth Neiman (United States) Johannes van Overbeek	Porsche 4.0 L Flat-6	M	153
11	GT2	92	(United States) BMW Rahal Letterman Racing	(United States) Tommy Milner (Germany) Dirk Müller	BMW M3 GT2	D	153
11	GT2	92	(United States) BMW Rahal Letterman Racing	(United States) Tommy Milner (Germany) Dirk Müller	BMW 4.0 L V8	D	153
12	GT2	18	(Germany) T-Mobile VICI Racing	(United Kingdom) Richard Westbrook (Germany) Johannes Stuck	Porsche 997 GT3-RSR	M	153
12	GT2	18	(Germany) T-Mobile VICI Racing	(United Kingdom) Richard Westbrook (Germany) Johannes Stuck	Porsche 4.0 L Flat-6	M	153
13	GT2	17	(United States) Team Falken Tire	(United States) Bryan Sellers (United States) Dominic Cicero	Porsche 997 GT3-RSR	F	150
13	GT2	17	(United States) Team Falken Tire	(United States) Bryan Sellers (United States) Dominic Cicero	Porsche 4.0 L Flat-6	F	150
14	LMP2	16	(United States) Dyson Racing Team	(United States) Chris Dyson (United Kingdom) Guy Smith (United Kingdom) Ben Devlin	Lola B09/86	M	150
14	LMP2	16	(United States) Dyson Racing Team	(United States) Chris Dyson (United Kingdom) Guy Smith (United Kingdom) Ben Devlin	Mazda MZR-R 2.0 L Turbo I4 (Butanol)	M	150
15	GT2	28	(United States) LG Motorsports	(United States) Lou Gigliotti (United States) Tom Sutherland (United States) Tomy Drissi	Chevrolet Corvette C6	D	150
15	GT2	28	(United States) LG Motorsports	(United States) Lou Gigliotti (United States) Tom Sutherland (United States) Tomy Drissi	Chevrolet LS3 6.3 L V8	D	150
16	**Chal**	**47**	**(United States) Orbit Racing**	**(United States) Guy Cosmo (United States) John Baker**	**Porsche 997 GT3 Cup**	Y	**144**
16	**Chal**	**47**	**(United States) Orbit Racing**	**(United States) Guy Cosmo (United States) John Baker**	**Porsche 3.6 L Flat-6**	Y	**144**
17	GT2	4	(United States) Corvette Racing	(United Kingdom) Oliver Gavin (Monaco) Olivier Beretta	Chevrolet Corvette C6.R	M	143
17	GT2	4	(United States) Corvette Racing	(United Kingdom) Oliver Gavin (Monaco) Olivier Beretta	Chevrolet 6.0 L V8	M	143
18	Chal	02	(United States) Gruppe Orange	(United States) Nick Parker (United States) Donald Pickering	Porsche 997 GT3 Cup	Y	140
18	Chal	02	(United States) Gruppe Orange	(United States) Nick Parker (United States) Donald Pickering	Porsche 3.6 L Flat-6	Y	140
19	Chal	69	(United States) P7 Racing	(United States) Robert Rodriquez (United States) Galen Bieker	Porsche 997 GT3 Cup	Y	140
19	Chal	69	(United States) P7 Racing	(United States) Robert Rodriquez (United States) Galen Bieker	Porsche 3.6 L Flat-6	Y	140
20	GT2	40	(United States) Robertson Racing	(United States) David Robertson (United States) Andrea Robertson (United States) David Murry	Ford GT-R Mk. VII	D	139
20	GT2	40	(United States) Robertson Racing	(United States) David Robertson (United States) Andrea Robertson (United States) David Murry	Ford 5.0 L V8	D	139
21	Chal	08	(United States) Orbit Racing	(United States) Ed Brown (United States) Bill Sweedler	Porsche 997 GT3 Cup	Y	138
21	Chal	08	(United States) Orbit Racing	(United States) Ed Brown (United States) Bill Sweedler	Porsche 3.6 L Flat-6	Y	138
22 DNF	LMP1	37	(United States) Intersport Racing	(United States) Jon Field (United States) Clint Field	Lola B06/10	D	125
22 DNF	LMP1	37	(United States) Intersport Racing	(United States) Jon Field (United States) Clint Field	AER P32C 4.0 L Turbo V8	D	125
23 DNF	LMP2	6	(United States) Team Cytosport	(United States) Greg Pickett (Germany) Klaus Graf	Porsche RS Spyder Evo	M	124
23 DNF	LMP2	6	(United States) Team Cytosport	(United States) Greg Pickett (Germany) Klaus Graf	Porsche MR6 3.4 L V8	M	124
24 NC	Chal	05	(United States) GMG Racing	(United States) Bret Curtis (United States) James Sofronas	Porsche 997 GT3 Cup	Y	89
24 NC	Chal	05	(United States) GMG Racing	(United States) Bret Curtis (United States) James Sofronas	Porsche 3.6 L Flat-6	Y	89
25 DNF	Chal	57	(United States) Snow Racing	(United States) Martin Snow (United States) Melanie Snow	Porsche 997 GT3 Cup	Y	52
25 DNF	Chal	57	(United States) Snow Racing	(United States) Martin Snow (United States) Melanie Snow	Porsche 3.6 L Flat-6	Y	52
26 DNF	GT2	62	(United States) Risi Competizione	(Brazil) Jaime Melo (Germany) Pierre Kaffer	Ferrari F430GT	M	49
26 DNF	GT2	62	(United States) Risi Competizione	(Brazil) Jaime Melo (Germany) Pierre Kaffer	Ferrari 4.0 L V8	M	49
27 DNF	GT2	33	(United States) RSR	(United States) Paul Gentilozzi (Belgium) Marc Goossens	Jaguar XKR	Y	46
27 DNF	GT2	33	(United States) RSR	(United States) Paul Gentilozzi (Belgium) Marc Goossens	Jaguar 4.2 L V8	Y	46
28 DNF	LMP2	20	(United States) Dyson Racing Team	(United States) Butch Leitzinger (United Kingdom) Marino Franchitti	Lola B08/86	M	31
28 DNF	LMP2	20	(United States) Dyson Racing Team	(United States) Butch Leitzinger (United Kingdom) Marino Franchitti	Mazda MZR-R 2.0 L Turbo I4	M	31
29 DNF	GT2	90	(United States) BMW Rahal Letterman Racing	(United States) Bill Auberlen (United States) Joey Hand	BMW M3 GT2	D	3
29 DNF	GT2	90	(United States) BMW Rahal Letterman Racing	(United States) Bill Auberlen (United States) Joey Hand	BMW 4.0 L V8	D	3
30 DNF	LMP1	88	(United Kingdom) Drayson Racing	(United Kingdom) Paul Drayson (United Kingdom) Jonny Cocker	Lola B09/60	M	2
30 DNF	LMP1	88	(United Kingdom) Drayson Racing	(United Kingdom) Paul Drayson (United Kingdom) Jonny Cocker	Judd GV5.5 S2 5.5 L V10	M	2
DSQ	Chal	38	(United States) Velox Motorsport	(United States) Shane Lewis (United States) Mitchell Pagerey	Porsche 997 GT3 Cup	Y	144
DSQ	Chal	38	(United States) Velox Motorsport	(United States) Shane Lewis (United States) Mitchell Pagerey	Porsche 3.6 L Flat-6	Y	144
DSQ	Chal	36	(United States) Gruppe Orange	(United States) Wesley Hoaglund (United States) Bob Faieta	Porsche 997 GT3 Cup	Y	144
DSQ	Chal	36	(United States) Gruppe Orange	(United States) Wesley Hoaglund (United States) Bob Faieta	Porsche 3.6 L Flat-6	Y	144
DNS	LMP1	10	(United Kingdom) ECO Racing	(Japan) Hideki Noda (United States) Cort Wagner (Greece) Nikolas Konstant	Radical SR9	D	–
DNS	LMP1	10	(United Kingdom) ECO Racing	(Japan) Hideki Noda (United States) Cort Wagner (Greece) Nikolas Konstant	ECO (AER) 5.0 L Turbo V10 (Diesel)	D	–

American Le Mans Series
Previous race: Petit Le Mans	2009 season	Next race: None
