= 2009 Sports Car Challenge of Mid-Ohio =

The layout of Mid-Ohio Sports Car Course

The 2009 Acura Sports Car Challenge of Mid-Ohio was the sixth round of the 2009 American Le Mans Series season. It took place at the Mid-Ohio Sports Car Course, Lexington, Ohio on August 8, 2009. Gil de Ferran and Simon Pagenaud won their fourth consecutive race, beating the Highcroft Racing Acura by 8.3 seconds. After losing out at the previous round at Lime Rock Park, Fernández Racing Acura won the LMP2 category for the fifth time this season, ahead of class newcomer Team Cytosport's Porsche RS Spyder. Flying Lizard Motorsports also continued their winning streak by claiming the GT2 class victory, beating the debuting revamped Corvette Racing Corvette C6.R. Martin and Melanie Snow won the ALMS Challenge class by a gap of two laps over the second place Orbit Racing Porsche.

== Report ==
=== Qualifying ===
Gil de Ferran, driving the car of his own team, claimed pole position for Mid-Ohio by outpacing David Brabham's Highcroft car by less than .07 seconds. Acura also led the LMP2 category with Fernández Racing leading the two Dyson Racing Team entries. Jörg Bergmeister led Flying Lizard Motorsports to the top of the GT2 category, ahead of Jaime Melo's Risi Ferrari. Professional driver Guy Cosmo put the Orbit Racing Porsche on pole within the Challenge class.

==== Qualifying result ====
Pole position winners in each class are marked in bold.

Pos	Class	Team	Qualifying Driver	Lap Time
1	**LMP1**	**#66 de Ferran Motorsports**	**Gil de Ferran**	**1:09.443**
2	LMP1	#9 Patrón Highcroft Racing	David Brabham	1:09.512
3	**LMP2**	**#15 Lowe's Fernández Racing**	**Luis Díaz**	**1:10.464**
4	LMP2	#16 Dyson Racing Team	Chris Dyson	1:10.498
5	LMP2	#20 Dyson Racing Team	Butch Leitzinger	1:11.042
6	LMP2	#6 Team Cytosport	Klaus Graf	1:11.404
7	LMP1	#37 Intersport Racing	Jon Field	1:12.145
8	LMP2	#19 van der Steur Racing	Adam Pecorari	1:15.898
9	LMP1	#12 Autocon Motorsports	Tomy Drissi	1:16.153
10	**GT2**	**#45 Flying Lizard Motorsports**	**Jörg Bergmeister**	**1:21.022**
11	GT2	#62 Risi Competizione	Jaime Melo	1:21.287
12	GT2	#3 Corvette Racing	Jan Magnussen	1:21.454
13	GT2	#92 BMW Rahal Letterman Racing	Dirk Müller	1:21.516
14	GT2	#78 Farnbacher-Loles Motorsport	Wolf Henzler	1:21.557
15	GT2	#4 Corvette Racing	Oliver Gavin	1:21.571
16	GT2	#90 BMW Rahal Letterman Racing	Joey Hand	1:21.607
17	GT2	#40 Robertson Racing	David Murry	1:22.092
18	GT2	#21 PTG Team Panoz	Dominik Farnbacher	1:22.259
19	GT2	#44 Flying Lizard Motorsports	Seth Neiman	1:26.003
20	**Chal**	**#47 Orbit Racing**	**Guy Cosmo**	**1:27.070**
21	Chal	#88 Velox Motorsport	Shane Lewis	1:27.203
22	Chal	#08 Orbit Racing	Bill Sweedler	1:28.247
23	Chal	#57 Snow Racing	Martin Snow	1:28.337
24	Chal	#36 Gruppe Orange	Bob Faieta	1:28.423
25	Chal	#02 Gruppe Orange	Donald Pickering	1:29.470
26	LMP1	#48 Corsa Motorsports	Did Not Participate	

=== Race ===
==== Race result ====
Class winners are marked in bold. Cars failing to complete 70% of winner's distance marked as Not Classified (NC).

Pos	Class	No	Team	Drivers	Chassis	Tire	Laps
Pos	Class	No	Team	Drivers	Engine	Tire	Laps
1	**LMP1**	**66**	**(United States) de Ferran Motorsports**	**(Brazil) Gil de Ferran (France) Simon Pagenaud**	**Acura ARX-02a**	MI	**118**
1	**LMP1**	**66**	**(United States) de Ferran Motorsports**	**(Brazil) Gil de Ferran (France) Simon Pagenaud**	**Acura AR7 4.0 L V8**	MI	**118**
2	LMP1	9	(United States) Patrón Highcroft Racing	(Australia) David Brabham (United States) Scott Sharp	Acura ARX-02a	MI	118
2	LMP1	9	(United States) Patrón Highcroft Racing	(Australia) David Brabham (United States) Scott Sharp	Acura AR7 4.0 L V8	MI	118
3	**LMP2**	**15**	**(Mexico) Lowe's Fernández Racing**	**(Mexico) Adrian Fernández (Mexico) Luis Díaz**	**Acura ARX-01B**	MI	**116**
3	**LMP2**	**15**	**(Mexico) Lowe's Fernández Racing**	**(Mexico) Adrian Fernández (Mexico) Luis Díaz**	**Acura AL7R 3.4 L V8**	MI	**116**
4	LMP2	6	(United States) Team Cytosport	(United States) Greg Pickett (Germany) Klaus Graf	Porsche RS Spyder Evo	MI	116
4	LMP2	6	(United States) Team Cytosport	(United States) Greg Pickett (Germany) Klaus Graf	Porsche MR6 3.4 L V8	MI	116
5	LMP1	37	(United States) Intersport Racing	(United States) Jon Field (United States) Clint Field	Lola B06/10	D	115
5	LMP1	37	(United States) Intersport Racing	(United States) Jon Field (United States) Clint Field	AER P32C 4.0 L Turbo V8	D	115
6	LMP1	48	(United States) Corsa Motorsports	(United Kingdom) Johnny Mowlem (Sweden) Stefan Johansson	Ginetta-Zytek GZ09HS	D	114
6	LMP1	48	(United States) Corsa Motorsports	(United Kingdom) Johnny Mowlem (Sweden) Stefan Johansson	Zytek ZJ458 4.5 L Hybrid V8	D	114
7	**GT2**	**45**	**(United States) Flying Lizard Motorsports**	**(United States) Patrick Long (Germany) Jörg Bergmeister**	**Porsche 997 GT3-RSR**	MI	**108**
7	**GT2**	**45**	**(United States) Flying Lizard Motorsports**	**(United States) Patrick Long (Germany) Jörg Bergmeister**	**Porsche 4.0 L Flat-6**	MI	**108**
8	GT2	3	(United States) Corvette Racing	(United States) Johnny O'Connell (Denmark) Jan Magnussen	Chevrolet Corvette C6.R	MI	108
8	GT2	3	(United States) Corvette Racing	(United States) Johnny O'Connell (Denmark) Jan Magnussen	Chevrolet 6.0 L V8	MI	108
9	GT2	92	(United States) BMW Rahal Letterman Racing	(United States) Tommy Milner (Germany) Dirk Müller	BMW M3 GT2	D	107
9	GT2	92	(United States) BMW Rahal Letterman Racing	(United States) Tommy Milner (Germany) Dirk Müller	BMW 4.0 L V8	D	107
10	GT2	4	(United States) Corvette Racing	(United Kingdom) Oliver Gavin (Monaco) Olivier Beretta	Chevrolet Corvette C6.R	MI	107
10	GT2	4	(United States) Corvette Racing	(United Kingdom) Oliver Gavin (Monaco) Olivier Beretta	Chevrolet 6.0 L V8	MI	107
11	GT2	62	(United States) Risi Competizione	(Brazil) Jaime Melo (Germany) Pierre Kaffer	Ferrari F430GT	MI	107
11	GT2	62	(United States) Risi Competizione	(Brazil) Jaime Melo (Germany) Pierre Kaffer	Ferrari 4.0 L V8	MI	107
12	GT2	87	(United States) Farnbacher-Loles Motorsports	(Germany) Wolf Henzler (Austria) Martin Ragginger	Porsche 997 GT3-RSR	MI	107
12	GT2	87	(United States) Farnbacher-Loles Motorsports	(Germany) Wolf Henzler (Austria) Martin Ragginger	Porsche 4.0 L Flat-6	MI	107
13	GT2	21	(United States) Panoz Team PTG	(United Kingdom) Ian James (Germany) Dominik Farnbacher	Panoz Esperante GT-LM	Y	107
13	GT2	21	(United States) Panoz Team PTG	(United Kingdom) Ian James (Germany) Dominik Farnbacher	Ford 5.0 L V8	Y	107
14	GT2	90	(United States) BMW Rahal Letterman Racing	(United States) Bill Auberlen (United States) Joey Hand	BMW M3 GT2	D	106
14	GT2	90	(United States) BMW Rahal Letterman Racing	(United States) Bill Auberlen (United States) Joey Hand	BMW 4.0 L V8	D	106
15	GT2	44	(United States) Flying Lizard Motorsports	(United States) Darren Law (United States) Seth Neiman	Porsche 997 GT3-RSR	MI	104
15	GT2	44	(United States) Flying Lizard Motorsports	(United States) Darren Law (United States) Seth Neiman	Porsche 4.0 L Flat-6	MI	104
16	GT2	40	(United States) Robertson Racing	(United States) David Robertson (United States) Andrea Robertson (United States) David Murry	Ford GT-R Mk. VII	D	102
16	GT2	40	(United States) Robertson Racing	(United States) David Robertson (United States) Andrea Robertson (United States) David Murry	Ford 5.0 L V8	D	102
17 DNF	LMP2	20	(United States) Dyson Racing Team	(United States) Butch Leitzinger (United Kingdom) Marino Franchitti	Lola B08/86	MI	100
17 DNF	LMP2	20	(United States) Dyson Racing Team	(United States) Butch Leitzinger (United Kingdom) Marino Franchitti	Mazda MZR-R 2.0 L Turbo I4	MI	100
18	**Chal**	**57**	**(United States) Snow Racing**	**(United States) Martin Snow (United States) Melanie Snow**	**Porsche 997 GT3 Cup**	Y	**100**
18	**Chal**	**57**	**(United States) Snow Racing**	**(United States) Martin Snow (United States) Melanie Snow**	**Porsche 3.6 L Flat-6**	Y	**100**
19	Chal	47	(United States) Orbit Racing	(United States) Guy Cosmo (United States) John Baker	Porsche 997 GT3 Cup	Y	98
19	Chal	47	(United States) Orbit Racing	(United States) Guy Cosmo (United States) John Baker	Porsche 3.6 L Flat-6	Y	98
20	Chal	36	(United States) Gruppe Orange	(United States) Wesley Hoaglund (United States) Bob Faieta	Porsche 997 GT3 Cup	Y	98
20	Chal	36	(United States) Gruppe Orange	(United States) Wesley Hoaglund (United States) Bob Faieta	Porsche 3.6 L Flat-6	Y	98
21	Chal	88	(United States) Velox Motorsport	(United States) Shane Lewis (United States) Gerry Ventos	Porsche 997 GT3 Cup	Y	96
21	Chal	88	(United States) Velox Motorsport	(United States) Shane Lewis (United States) Gerry Ventos	Porsche 3.6 L Flat-6	Y	96
22 NC	LMP2	19	(United States) van der Steur Racing	(United States) Gunnar van der Steur (United States) Adam Pecorari	Radical SR9	KU	80
22 NC	LMP2	19	(United States) van der Steur Racing	(United States) Gunnar van der Steur (United States) Adam Pecorari	AER P07 2.0 L Turbo I4	KU	80
23 DNF	Chal	02	(United States) Gruppe Orange	(United States) Nick Parker (United States) Donald Pickering	Porsche 997 GT3 Cup	Y	77
23 DNF	Chal	02	(United States) Gruppe Orange	(United States) Nick Parker (United States) Donald Pickering	Porsche 3.6 L Flat-6	Y	77
24 DNF	LMP2	16	(United States) Dyson Racing Team	(United States) Chris Dyson (United Kingdom) Guy Smith	Lola B09/86	MI	62
24 DNF	LMP2	16	(United States) Dyson Racing Team	(United States) Chris Dyson (United Kingdom) Guy Smith	Mazda MZR-R 2.0 L Turbo I4	MI	62
25 DNF	LMP1	12	(United States) Autocon Motorsports	(United States) Bryan Willman (United States) Tomy Drissi	Lola B06/10	D	40
25 DNF	LMP1	12	(United States) Autocon Motorsports	(United States) Bryan Willman (United States) Tomy Drissi	AER P32C 4.0 L Turbo V8	D	40
26 DNF	Chal	08	(United States) Orbit Racing	(United States) Ed Brown (United States) Bill Sweedler	Porsche 997 GT3 Cup	Y	0
26 DNF	Chal	08	(United States) Orbit Racing	(United States) Ed Brown (United States) Bill Sweedler	Porsche 3.6 L Flat-6	Y	0

American Le Mans Series
Previous race: Northeast Grand Prix	2009 season	Next race: Road Race Showcase
