= Acura ARX-02a =

Le Mans Prototype car by Acura

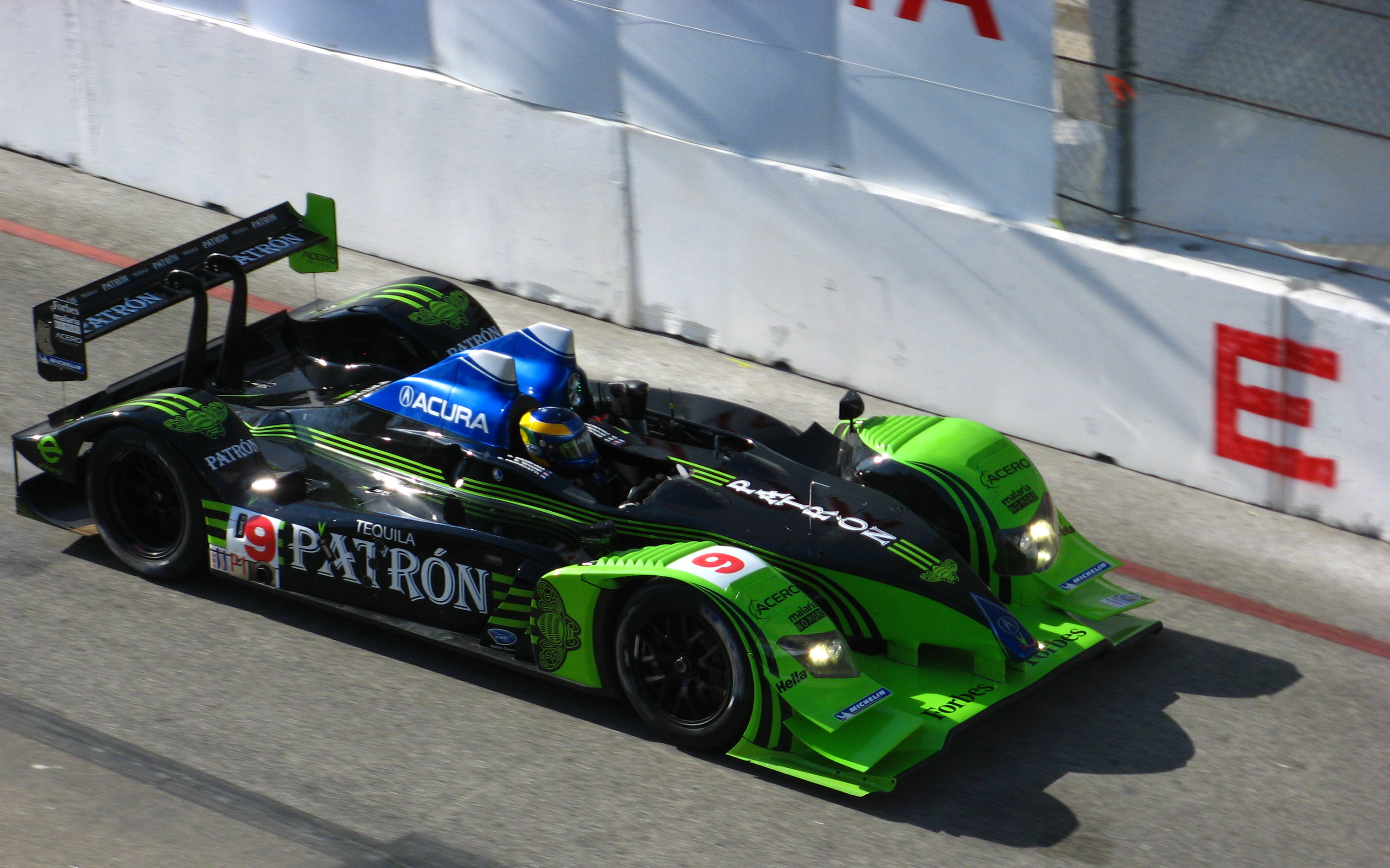
- The No. 9 ARX-02a at 2009 GP of Long Beach
- Category: Le Mans Prototype (LMP1)
- Constructor: Acura (Wirth)
- Designer: Nick Wirth
- Predecessor: Acura ARX-01
- Successor: HPD ARX-03

Technical specifications
- Chassis: Carbon fibre and aluminium monocoque
- Suspension (front): Double wishbone, torsion springs and damper, anti-roll bar
- Suspension (rear): Double wishbone, torsion springs and damper, anti-roll bar
- Axle track: 2,000 mm (78.7 in)
- Wheelbase: 2,900 mm (114.2 in)
- Engine: Acura LM-AR7 4.0 litre V8 naturally aspirated, mid-engined, longitudinally mounted
- Transmission: 6-speed sequential manual
- Weight: appr. 900 kg (1,984.2 lb)
- Tyres: Michelin

Competition history
- Notable entrants: (United States) de Ferran Motorsports (United States) Highcroft Racing
- Notable drivers: (Australia) David Brabham (United States) Scott Sharp (Brazil) Gil de Ferran (France) Simon Pagenaud
- Debut: 2009 12 Hours of Sebring
- First win: 2009 American Le Mans Series at Long Beach
- Last win: 2009 Monterey Sports Car Championships
- Last event: 2009 Monterey Sports Car Championships
Races	Wins	Poles	F/Laps
10	8	8	7
- Constructors' Championships: 1 (2009 ALMS)
- Drivers' Championships: 1 (2009 ALMS)

The Acura ARX-02a was a Le Mans Prototype constructed by Acura for competition in the LMP1 category of the American Le Mans Series. It was Acura's second Le Mans Prototype, following their ARX-01 which competed in the LMP2 category.

== Development ==
Unlike the ARX-01, the ARX-02 is a bespoke LMP designed entirely for Acura by Wirth Research. The original 3.4L V8 was expanded to 4 liters for more durability and drivability with the larger power developed with P1 rules.

Wirth Research developed a chassis to generate as much mechanical grip to overcome the power deficit to Diesel centric rules created by the ACO by exploiting the engine's low mass (low compared to larger Diesel engines). Rear tires are now fitted onto the front of the car, increasing the contact patch by 7%, indicating that the vehicle center of mass was more forward placed than its contemporaries.

== Racing history ==
The ARX-02a were campaigned by two teams, de Ferran Motorsport (Gil de Ferran, Simon Pagenaud and Scott Dixon) and Highcroft Racing (David Brabham, Scott Sharp and Dario Franchitti), and made its competition debut at the 2009 12 Hours of Sebring. Scott Dixon put the de Ferran entry on pole position at Sebring ahead of all the diesels of Audi and Peugeot due to slippery but dry track conditions. However, within the first corner of the race Acura were overcome by Allan McNish in the Audi. Neither Acura finished the race due to mechanical issues and never featured as a threat to win the race, lapping at 2.5 seconds off the winning pace.

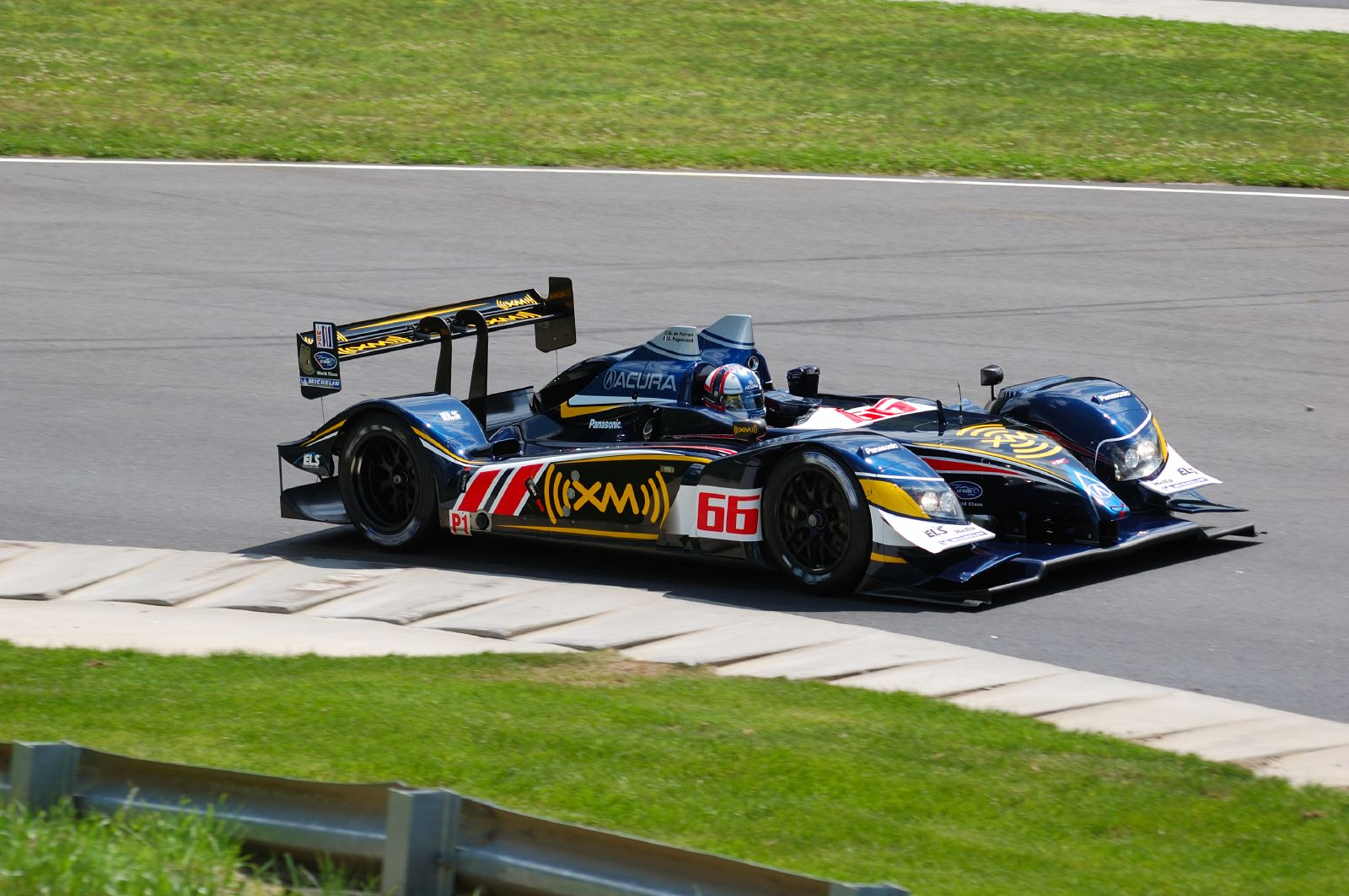
The No. 66 de Ferran Motorsport car won the 2009 Northeast Grand Prix

Throughout the ALMS, the Acura gained overall wins until the Petit Le Mans. In all of the races, the bigger tires took longer to warm up than most competitors resulting in position loss to the turbo charged P1 Lola's at race starts and restarts. Scott Sharp crashed heavily at Petit Le Mans and the team spent the next 24 hours rebuilding the car with assistance from de Ferran. At the final race at Laguna Seca, Gil de Ferran won a hard-fought battle with the Fernandez ARX-01.

In 2010, de Ferran closed shop and Highcroft was forced to abandon the car, ending the career of the ARX-02. Highcroft returned to campaigning an updated version of the existing ARX-01 for the combined LMP class in 2010.

=== Complete American Le Mans Series results ===
(key) Races in bold indicates pole position. Races in italics indicates fastest lap.

Complete American Le Mans Series results
Year	Entrant	Class	Drivers	No.	Rds.	Rounds										Pts.	Pos.
Year	Entrant	Class	Drivers	No.	Rds.	1	2	3	4	5	6	7	8	9	10	Pts.	Pos.
2009	(United States) Patrón Highcroft Racing	LMP1	(Australia) David Brabham (United States) Scott Sharp (United Kingdom) Dario Franchitti	9	All; All; 1, 9	SEB; 5†	STP; 1	**LBH**; **2**	UTA; 2	LIM; 2	MOH; 2	ELK; 1	**MOS**; **1**	ATL; 6	LGA; 2	179	1st
2009	(United States) de Ferran Motorsports	LMP1	(Brazil) Gil de Ferran (France) Simon Pagenaud (New Zealand) Scott Dixon	66	All; All; 1, 9	**SEB**; **Ret**	**STP**; **3†**	LBH; 1	**UTA**; **1**	**LIM**; **1**	**MOH**; **1**	**ELK**; **2**	MOS; 2	ATL; 9	**LGA**; **1**	162	2nd

^{†} Did not finish the race but was classified as they completed more than 70% of the race distance.
