= Gil de Ferran =

Brazilian racecar driver and team owner (1967–2023)

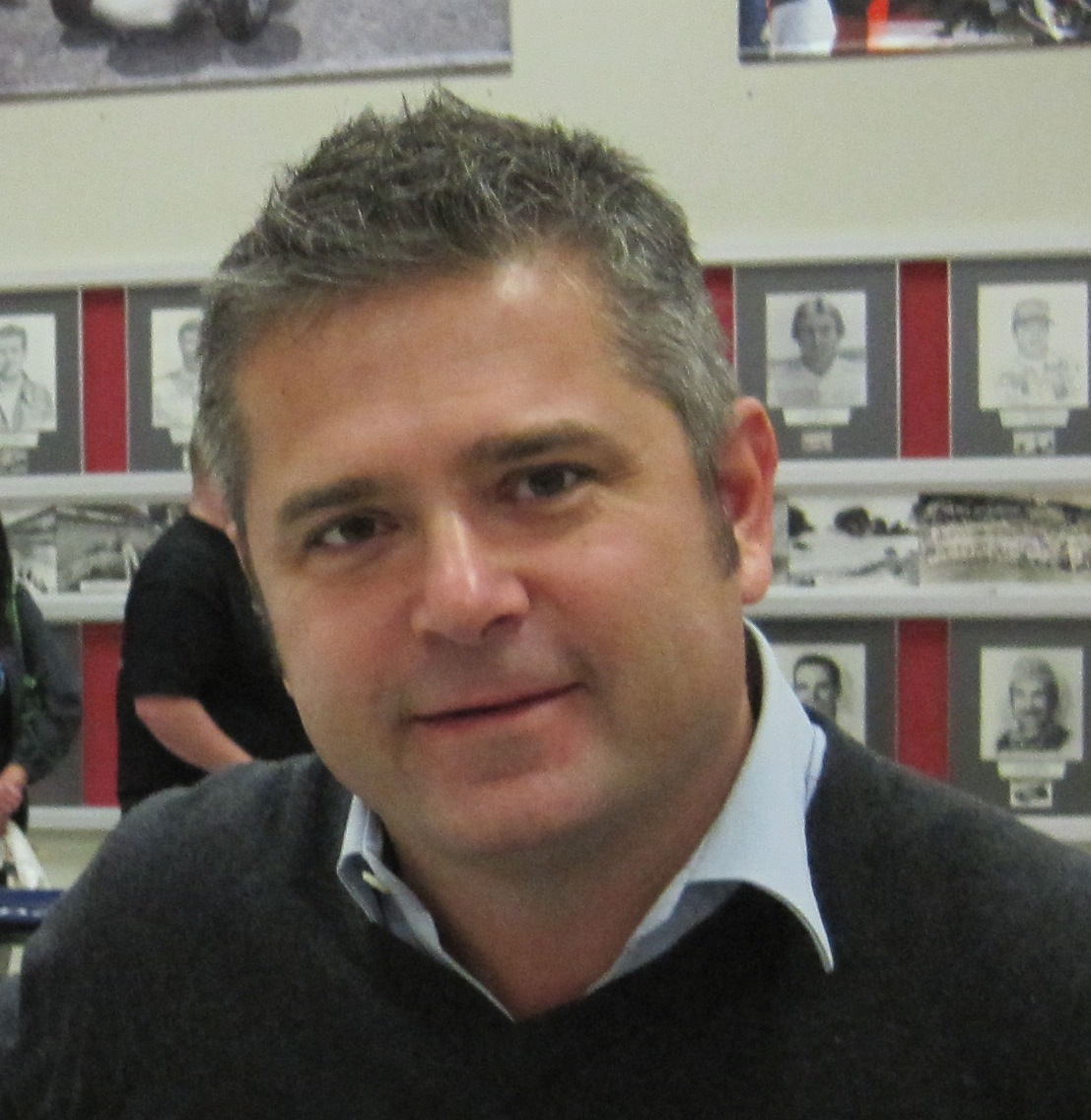
- De Ferran in 2011
- Nationality: Brazilian
- Born: 11 November 1967 Paris, France
- Died: 29 December 2023 (aged 56) Opa-locka, Florida, U.S.

IRL IndyCar Series
- Years active: 2001–2003
- Teams: Penske Racing
- Starts: 31
- Wins: 5
- Poles: 5
- Best finish: 2nd in 2003

PPG IndyCar World Series/CART FedEx Championship Series
- Years active: 1995–2001
- Teams: Hall/VDS Racing; Walker Racing; Penske Racing
- Starts: 129
- Wins: 7
- Poles: 16
- Best finish: 1st in 2000 & 2001

Previous series
- 1991–1992 1993–1994: British Formula Three; Formula 3000

Championship titles
- 1992 2000–2001 2003: British Formula Three Champion; CART World Series Champion; Indianapolis 500 winner

Awards
- 1995: CART Rookie of the Year

Gil de Ferran (11 November 1967 – 29 December 2023) was a Brazilian professional racing driver and team owner. De Ferran was the 2000 and 2001 Champ Car champion driving for Team Penske and the winner of the 2003 Indianapolis 500. He also finished runner-up in the American Le Mans Series LMP1 class in 2009, with his own de Ferran Motorsports.

== Early career ==
Inspired by the success of fellow Brazilian Emerson Fittipaldi, de Ferran began his career in kart racing in the 1980s. He won the Formula Ford championship in Brazil in 1987, and started racing in the Formula Three class in 1991. Driving for Edenbridge Racing, de Ferran finished the 1991 British Formula Three season in third, only behind Rubens Barrichello and David Coulthard. For the 1992 season, de Ferran moved to Paul Stewart Racing and won the title, scoring seven wins in the process.

In 1993 and 1994, de Ferran drove for Paul Stewart Racing in the International Formula 3000. De Ferran finished fifth in the series in 1993 and then took the championship down to the wire in 1994, ultimately finishing third. In 1993, de Ferran tested for the Footwork Arrows Formula One team along with Dutch racer Jos Verstappen. His day was seriously compromised after he bumped his head while walking near the motorhome, with de Ferran recalling the incident as follows: "I was walking between two of the trucks, looking down thinking, this is not going so well. And I hit my head on a swing-up locker door on the side of the truck. Split my head open, blood everywhere, game over." His times also compared poorly to Verstappen's.

== IndyCar ==
In 1994, de Ferran was invited to test a CART IndyCar by Hall/VDS Racing. Despite the worries of the team's sponsor Pennzoil that de Ferran was not a famous enough name for their car, the team was sufficiently impressed to offer de Ferran a drive for 1995. With no top-line Formula One drive available, de Ferran took up the offer to drive in the United States. After dominating the Cleveland CART PPG Indy Car World Series race he would be taken out while trying to lap Scott Pruett. He would score his first win in the last race of the year at Laguna Seca Raceway. After the win, De Ferran placed 14th in the 1995 PPG Indy Car World Series, and won the PPG Indy Car World Series Rookie Of The Year award.

In 1996, de Ferran was a consistent challenger but only scored one win, at Cleveland's Burke Lakefront Airport street circuit, avenging the previous season's loss at the same race. This win was also the last for veteran car owner and driver Jim Hall who retired from the sport at the end of 1996. Hall's retirement also spelled the end of the Jim Hall owned Pennzoil/VDS IndyCar team. Despite rumours that he would be a driver for the new Stewart Grand Prix Formula One team, de Ferran remained in the U.S. for 1997, joining Walker Racing. De Ferran finished 1997 as runner-up to Alex Zanardi with twelve top-ten finishes but failed to score a single victory. He looked on course to win the season opener at Homestead-Miami Speedway but was knocked out of the lead by Dennis Vitolo, who was a lap down from de Ferran. At the Grand Prix of Portland he lost out to PacWest Racing's Mark Blundell in the closest finish in CART history. The expected championship challenge never materialized in 1998. Unreliability, driver errors and the inferior performance of the Goodyear tires compared to the superior Firestone tires all combined to leave de Ferran 12th in the standings, again with no wins on the year.

In 1999, the long-awaited breakthrough finally came as de Ferran beat Juan Pablo Montoya at Portland International Raceway to take his first win since 1996 and the Walker Racing team's first since early 1995. However, after that victory, both Goodyear and Valvoline left CART as major sponsors and suppliers. Toward the end of that season, de Ferran and Greg Moore were signed to Marlboro Team Penske to replace Al Unser Jr. However, Moore was killed in a crash during the season finale at California Speedway and de Ferran's fellow countryman Hélio Castroneves was announced as the replacement for Moore shortly afterwards.

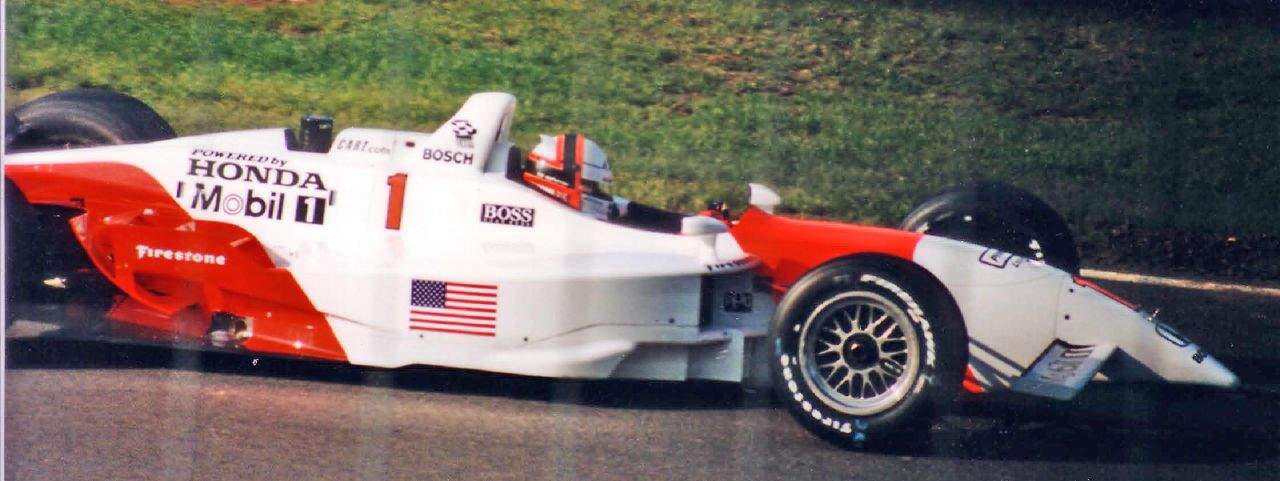
De Ferran's car in 2001

On 28 October 2000, during CART qualifying at California Speedway in Fontana, de Ferran set both the track record and closed course record for fastest lap at 241.428 mph (388.541 km/h). As of May 2026, this stands as the fastest qualifying lap speed ever recorded at an official race meeting. He would follow the record speed by winning the series championship at Fontana on 30 October (The season finale started on 29 October but was forced to finish on 30 October due to rain).

With Team Penske, de Ferran won two CART titles and an Indy 500 victory. His analytical approach earned him comparisons with Penske's first driver, Mark Donohue. In 2003, de Ferran was injured during a race at Phoenix, suffering a broken back. Despite the injury, de Ferran passed his teammate, Castroneves with 31 laps left to win the 2003 Indianapolis 500. It also was the second 1–2 finish for Penske Racing in the Indianapolis 500.

Following his Indianapolis triumph, de Ferran decided to retire at the end of 2003. He won his final race at Texas Motor Speedway, although the moment was soured by a crash during the race that left fellow Indy 500 winner and Rahal-Letterman Racing driver Kenny Bräck seriously injured. De Ferran would finish second in the championship standings, runner-up to Scott Dixon.

In July 2013, Autosport magazine named de Ferran one of the 50 greatest drivers to have never raced in Formula One.

== Managerial career ==
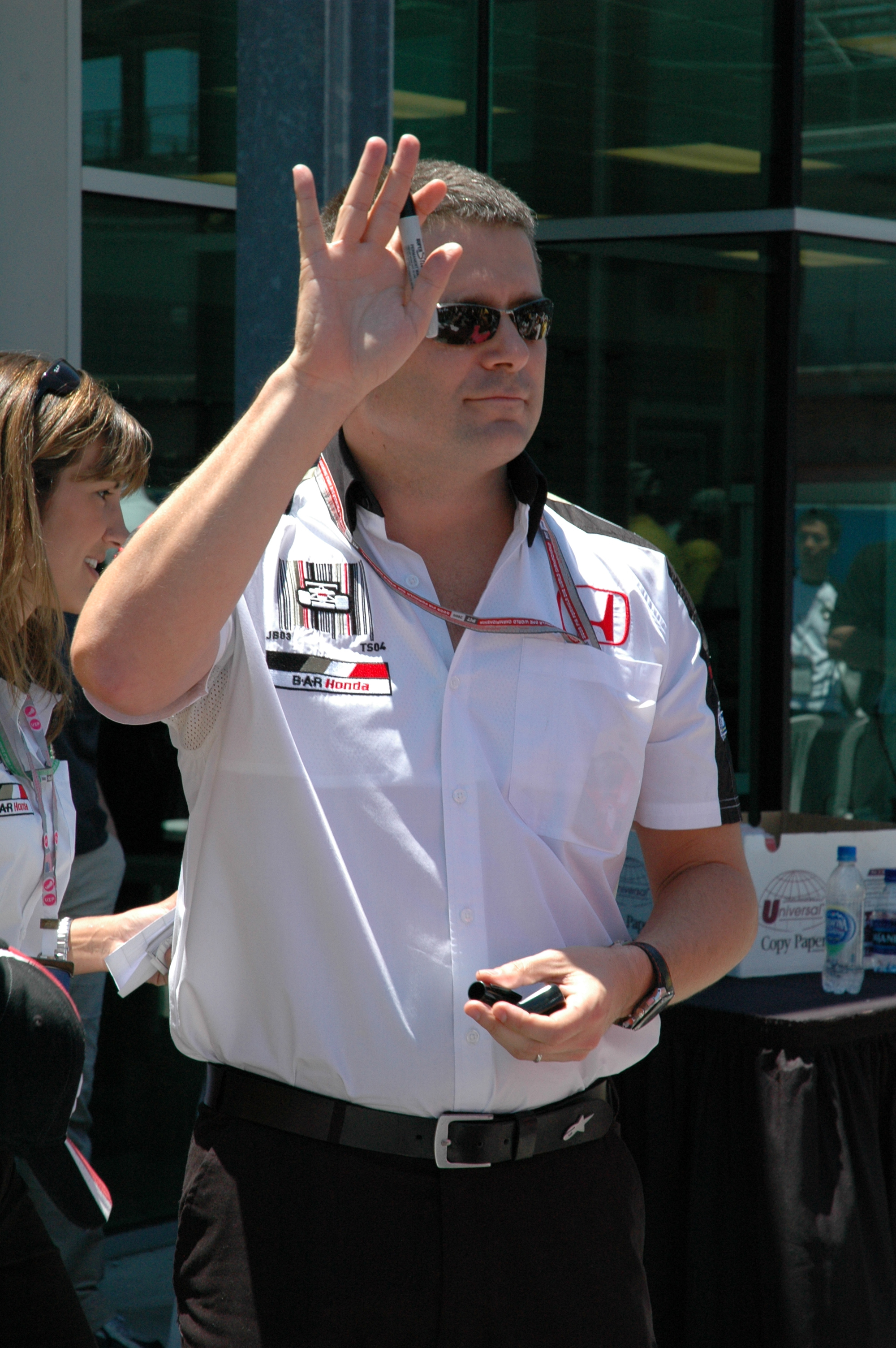
De Ferran at the 2005 United States Grand Prix

In 2005, de Ferran moved to the BAR-Honda Formula One team as their Sports Director. He resigned from this position in July 2007 after becoming "increasingly uncomfortable" with the team. In July 2018, de Ferran was made sporting director for McLaren following Eric Boullier's resignation. He left the team in early 2021. In May 2023, McLaren had brought back de Ferran in a consultant advisory role as part of their restructure process.

On 29 January 2008, de Ferran announced that he would return to the cockpit and field a factory-backed LMP2 class Acura ARX-01b prototype in the American Le Mans Series, under the team name de Ferran Motorsports. The team began competing around the mid-way point of the 2008 season, with de Ferran running the team and sharing driving duties with Simon Pagenaud. In its debut season, de Ferran Motorsports took four front row grid positions, led six races and scored three podium finishes in just eight starts. In 2009, de Ferran Motorsports was chosen by Honda to develop the Acura ARX-02a for competition in the LMP1 division of the American Le Mans Series. The team scored five outright wins, seven poles, and finished runners up in the ALMS LMP1 class.

In August 2009, de Ferran announced his retirement at the end of the racing season, expressing his intention to concentrate all his resources on expanding his team, making public his desire to return to IndyCar racing as a front running team owner. Prior to the start of the 2010 IZOD IndyCar season, de Ferran merged his team with Luczo Dragon Racing, a team started by Jay Penske, the son of de Ferran's former boss Roger Penske, and Steve Luczo, a successful technology leader and racing enthusiast. The new team was named de Ferran Dragon Racing and was the realization of de Ferran's ambition to return to IndyCar. De Ferran Dragon Racing, with driver Raphael Matos, earned four Top Ten finishes in its debut campaign and finished seventeenth in the season finale at Homestead-Miami Speedway. In 2010, IndyCar also began planning for a completely new car concept, to debut during the 2012 season. De Ferran was part of the ICONIC committee in the development of the future IndyCar. In 2011 de Ferran Dragon racing closed its doors after lacking sponsorships, having attempted to stay operational for the new season.

== Personal life and death ==
De Ferran was born on 11 November 1967 in Paris, France. He lived in Fort Lauderdale, Florida, with his English wife Angela (who worked for Paul Stewart Racing) and their two children.

De Ferran died on 29 December 2023, at age 56. He suffered a heart attack while driving at a private event with his son at The Concours Club in Opa-locka, Florida.

== Racing record ==
=== Career summary ===
Season	Series	Team	Races	Wins	Poles	F/Laps	Podiums	Points	Position
1985	Brazilian Formula Ford		8	0	0	0	0	—N/a	12th
1986	Brazilian Formula Ford		9	1	1	1	2	—N/a	7th
1987	Brazilian Formula Ford		10	5	5	5	8	—N/a	**1st**
1988	British Formula Ford 1600	Van Diemen	10	0	0	0	1	—N/a	10th
1988	British Formula Three	Techspeed Racing	1	0	1	0	1	6	16th
1989	BRDAC Formula Ford 1600	Swift Cooper	14	4	4	4	8	—N/a	**3rd**
1989	RAC Formula Ford 1600	Swift Cooper	12	4	0	3	4	—N/a	**3rd**
1989	Esso Formula Ford	Swift Cooper	12	4	4	4	5	—N/a	**3rd**
1990	Formula Opel Lotus Euroseries	Paul Stewart Racing	11	0	0	0	4	87	**3rd**
1990	Formula Vauxhall Lotus	Paul Stewart Racing	10	2	2	2	6	98	**2nd**
1990	Formula Opel Lotus Nations Cup	Brazil	2	0	0	0	0	—N/a	10th
1991	British Formula Three	Edenbridge Racing	15	3	5	2	6	54	**3rd**
1991	Formula Three Fuji Cup	Edenbridge Racing	1	0	0	0	0	—N/a	NC
1991	Macau Grand Prix	Theodore Racing w/ Edenbridge Racing	1	0	0	0	0	—N/a	NC
1992	British Formula Three	Paul Stewart Racing	16	7	6	6	7	102	**1st**
1992	Masters of Formula 3	Paul Stewart Racing	1	0	0	0	1	—N/a	**3rd**
1992	Macau Grand Prix	Paul Stewart Racing	1	0	0	0	0	—N/a	6th
1993	International Formula 3000	Paul Stewart Racing	9	1	1	1	3	21	4th
1993	Formula One	Footwork Mugen Honda	Test driver						
1994	International Formula 3000	Paul Stewart Racing	8	2	1	0	4	28	**3rd**
1995	PPG Indy Car World Series	Hall/VDS Racing	17	1	1	1	2	56	14th
1996	PPG Indy Car World Series	Hall/VDS Racing	16	1	1	0	4	104	6th
1997	CART PPG World Series	Walker Racing	17	0	2	1	7	162	**2nd**
1998	CART FedEx Championship Series	Walker Racing	19	0	0	0	2	67	12th
1999	CART FedEx Championship Series	Walker Racing	20	1	2	1	4	108	8th
2000	CART FedEx Championship Series	Penske Racing	20	2	5	2	7	168	**1st**
2001	CART FedEx Championship Series	Penske Racing	20	2	5	0	8	199	**1st**
2001	Indy Racing League	Team Penske	2	0	0	0	1	46	28th
2002	Indy Racing League	Marlboro Team Penske	14	2	4	0	7	443	**3rd**
2003	IndyCar Series	Penske Racing	15	3	1	0	8	489	**2nd**
2008	American Le Mans Series	de Ferran Motorsports	8	0	1	1	3	85	9th
2009	American Le Mans Series	de Ferran Motorsports	10	5	3	2	8	162	**2nd**
2011	International V8 Supercars	Tekno Autosports	2	0	0	0	0	150	60th

=== Complete British Formula Three Championship results ===
(key) (Races in bold indicate pole position) (Races in italics indicate fastest lap)

Year	Entrant	Engine	1	2	3	4	5	6	7	8	9	10	11	12	13	14	15	16	DC	Pts
1991	Edenbridge Racing	Mugen-Honda	SIL; 8	THR	DON; 7	BRH; 5	**BRH**; 1	THR; 8	SIL; 7	DON; 2	**SIL**; 1	**SIL**; 1	SNE; 5	**SIL**; 2	**BRH**; 2	DON; 5	SIL; 6	THR; 11	**3rd**	**54**
1992	Paul Stewart Racing	Mugen-Honda	DON; 3	**SIL**; 1	**THR**; 1	**BRH**; 2	THR; 2	**BRH**; 2	SIL; 1	SIL; 2	DON; 1	SNE; 5	SIL; Ret	PEM; 1	SIL; 2	**DON**; 3	**THR**; 1	SIL; 1	**1st**	**102**

=== Complete International Formula 3000 results ===
(key) (Races in bold indicate pole position) (Races in italics indicate fastest lap)

Year	Entrant	1	2	3	4	5	6	7	8	9	DC	Points
1993	Paul Stewart Racing	DON; Ret	**SIL**; 1	PAU; Ret	PER; Ret	HOC; 9†	NÜR; 2	SPA; 2	MAG; Ret	NOG; 7	4th	21
1994	Paul Stewart Racing	SIL; 3	**PAU**; 1	CAT; Ret	PER; 1	HOC; 3	SPA; 5	EST; Ret	MAG; Ret		**3rd**	**28**

=== Complete American Open Wheel Racing results ===
(key)

==== CART ====
Year	Team	No.	Chassis	Engine	1	2	3	4	5	6	7	8	9	10	11	12	13	14	15	16	17	18	19	20	21	Rank	Points	Ref
1995	Hall/VDS Racing	8	Reynard 95i	Mercedes-Benz IC108B V8 t	MIA; 25	SRF; 16	PHX; 11	LBH; 27	NZR; 19	INDY; 29	MIL; 8	DET; 16	POR; 10	ROA; 21	TOR; 16	**CLE**; 14	MIS; 12	MDO; 24	NHM; 7	VAN; 2	LS; 1					14th	56	
1996	Hall/VDS Racing	8	Reynard 96i	Honda HRH V8 t	MIA; 2	RIO; 10	SRF; 11	**LBH**; 5	NZR; 23	MIS1; 9	MIL; 9	DET; 3	POR; 2	CLE; 1	TOR; 18	MIS2; 19	MDO; 17	ROA; 25	VAN; 4	LS; 25						6th	104	
1997	Walker Racing	5	Reynard 97i	Honda HRR V8 t	MIA; 22	SRF; 5	**LBH**; 21	NZR; 4	RIO; 11	STL; 3	MIL; 7	**DET**; 3	POR; 2	CLE; 2	TOR; 25	MIS; 3	MDO; 6	ROA; 3	VAN; 3	LS; 5	FON; 6					2nd	162	
1998	Walker Racing	5	Reynard 98i	Honda HRK V8 t	MIA; 7	MOT; 3	LBH; 20	NZR; 4	RIO; 26	STL; 6	MIL; 22	DET; 3	POR; 20	CLE; 6	TOR; 27	MIS; 16	MDO; 9	ROA; 16	VAN; 13	LS; 19	HOU; 21	SRF; 14	FON; 17			12th	67	
1999	Walker Racing	5	Reynard 99i	Honda HRS V8 t	MIA; 6	**MOT**; 2	LBH; 6	NZR; 15	RIO; 10	STL; 25	MIL; 3	POR; 1	CLE; 2	ROA; 14	**TOR**; 19	MIS; 24	DET; 22	MDO; 6	CHI; 13	VAN; 26	LS; 6	HOU; 17	SRF; 27	FON; 9		8th	108	
2000	Penske Racing	2	Reynard 2Ki	Honda HR-0 V8 t	**MIA**; 6	**LBH**; 7	RIO; 17	MOT; 9	NZR; 1	MIL; 12	DET; 9	POR; 1	CLE; 14	TOR; 6	MIS; 18	CHI; 3	**MDO**; 2	ROA; 25	VAN; 5	LS; 2	STL; 8	**HOU**; 3	SRF; 23	**FON**; 3		1st	168	
2001	Penske Racing	1	Reynard 01i	Honda HR-1 V8 t	MTY; 2	LBH; 3	TXS; NH	NZR; 23	MOT; 13	MIL; 7	DET; 6	POR; 13	CLE; 4	**TOR**; 14	MIS; 24	CHI; 3	**MDO**; 2	ROA; 5	VAN; 2	**LAU**; 8	ROC; 1	**HOU**; 1	**LS**; 3	SRF; 4	FON; 6	1st	199	

==== IndyCar Series ====
Year	Team	Chassis	No.	Engine	1	2	3	4	5	6	7	8	9	10	11	12	13	14	15	16	Rank	Points	Ref
2001	Team Penske	Dallara IR-01	66	Oldsmobile Aurora V8	PHX; 24	HMS	ATL	INDY; 2	TXS	PPIR	RIR	KAN	NSH	KTY	STL	CHI	TX2				28th	46	
2002	Marlboro Team Penske	Dallara IR-02	6	Chevrolet Indy V8	HMS; 2	PHX; 2	FON; 4	**NZR**; 3	INDY; 10	TXS; 16	**PPIR**; 1	**RIR**; 2	KAN; 5	NSH; 2	MIS; 5	KTY; 21	**STL**; 1	CHI; 23	TX2; INJ		3rd	443	
2003	Penske Racing	Dallara IR-03	6	Toyota Indy V8	HMS; 2	PHX; 14	MOT; INJ			PPIR; 3	RIR; 3	KAN; 3	NSH; 1	MIS; 7	STL; 3	KTY; 9	NZR; 4	CHI; 12		**TX2**; 1	2nd	489	
2003	Penske Racing	G-Force GF09	6	Toyota Indy V8				INDY; 1	TXS; 8										FON; 15		2nd	489	

==== Indianapolis 500 results ====
Year	Chassis	Engine	Start	Finish	Team
1995	Reynard 95i	Mercedes-Benz IC108B V8 t	19	29	Hall/VDS Racing
2001	Dallara IR-01	Oldsmobile Aurora V8	5	2	Penske Racing
2002	Dallara IR-02	Chevrolet Indy V8	14	10	Penske Racing
2003	G-Force GF09	Toyota Indy V8	10	**1**	Penske Racing

==== CART career results ====
Year	Team	Wins	Points	Championship Finish
1995	Hall/VDS Racing	1	56	14th
1996	Hall/VDS Racing	1	104	6th
1997	Walker Racing	0	162	2nd
1998	Walker Racing	0	67	12th
1999	Walker Racing	1	108	8th
2000	Penske Racing	2	168	**1st**
2001	Penske Racing	2	199	**1st**

==== Indy Racing League career results ====
Year	Team	Wins	Points	Championship Finish
2001	Penske Racing	0	46	28th
2002	Penske Racing	2	443	3rd
2003	Penske Racing	3	489	2nd

=== Complete American Le Mans Series results ===
Year	Entrant	Class	Chassis	Engine	Tyres	1	2	3	4	5	6	7	8	9	10	11	Rank	Points	Ref
2008	de Ferran Motorsports	LMP2	Acura ARX-01b	Acura 3.4L V8	**M**	SEB	STP	LNB	UTA; 3	LIM; 14/7	MID; Ret	AME; 18/8	MOS; 7/5	DET; 3	PET; 8/5	MON; 4/2	9th	85	
2009	de Ferran Motorsports	LMP1	Acura ARX-02a	Acura 4.0L V8	**M**	SEB; Ret	STP; Ret	LNB; 1	UTA; 1	LIM; 1	MID; 1	AME; 2	MOS; 2	PET; 24/7	MON; 1		**2nd**	**162**	

Sporting positions
Preceded by Rubens Barrichello	British Formula Three Champion; 1992	Succeeded by Kelvin Burt
Preceded by Jacques Villeneuve	CART Rookie of the Year; 1995	Succeeded by Alex Zanardi
Preceded by Juan Pablo Montoya	CART Series; Champion; 2000–2001	Succeeded by Cristiano da Matta
Preceded by Hélio Castroneves	Indianapolis 500 Winner; 2003	Succeeded by Buddy Rice
