= Primetime Race Group =

American sports car racing team

(United States) Primetime Race Group
- Founded: 2007; 19 years ago
- Team principal(s): Joel Feinberg
- Current series: American Le Mans Series; IMSA Prototype Lites
- Drivers' Championships: 2009 IMSA Lites Series (now IMSA Prototype Lites)

The Primetime Race Group is a privateer motorsport team from Hollywood, Florida which currently competes in the American Le Mans Series (ALMS) and the International Motor Sports Association (IMSA) Lites Series, a support series of the ALMS.

The team was founded in 2007 by owner and driver Joel Feinberg. In addition to Feinberg, the team consists of driver Chris Hall and team manager and crew chief Brent O’Neill.

In 2009, the team runs a Dodge Viper Competition Coupe in the GT2 class of the ALMS series, the only team to feature this vehicle. The team also runs an Élan Motorsport Technologies DP02 in the IMSA Prototype Lites series.

== 2007 season ==
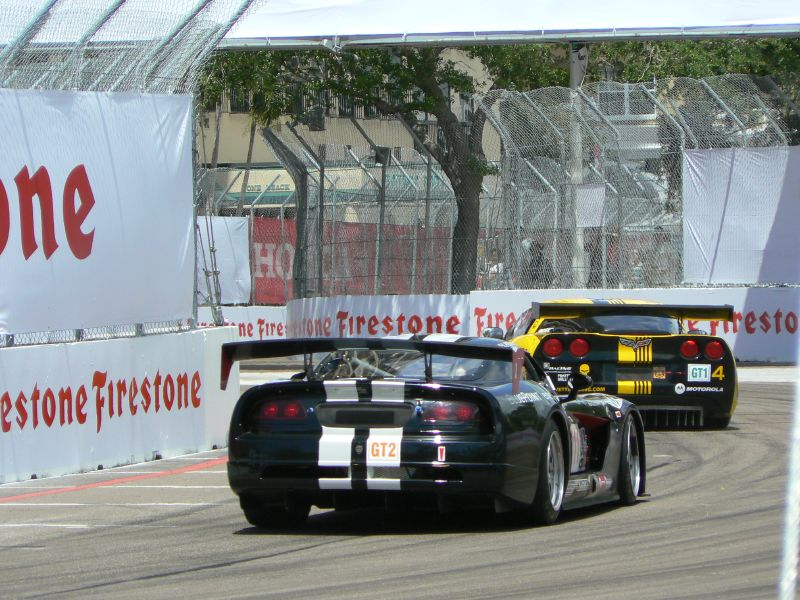
Primetime's Dodge Competition Coupe Viper

The team's debut in the ALMS series was at the 2007 Detroit Sports Car Challenge. Drivers Joel Feinberg and Chapman Ducote also competed at the Petit Le Mans and the Monterey Sports Car Championships for a total of 3 races during the season. The Primetime team also competed in the SPEED World Challenge and the IMSA Lites series. They finished third in the L1 class in 2007.

== 2008 season ==
2008 was the team's first full season of racing. During the 2008 American Le Mans Series season, the team raced with Hankook tires. The best result was a 5th-place finish in the GT2 class at the season opening race of 12 Hours of Sebring. The team finished tied for 10th place in the GT2 standings.

== 2009 season ==
For the 2009 season, the team expanded into open wheel racing, entering into the Atlantic Championship series with the acquisition of 2008 championship-winning No. 8 car and the No. 88 car from Brooks Associates Racing. The team still competes with the Viper in the American Le Mans Series, now using Dunlop tires, and also in IMSA Lites where Joel won the 2009 L1 drivers championship.
