= De Ferran Motorsports =

American racecar team

(United States) De Ferran Motorsports
- Founded: 2008
- Folded: 2009
- Team principal(s): Gil de Ferran
- Former series: American Le Mans Series
- Noted drivers: Gil de Ferran, Simon Pagenaud

De Ferran Motorsports was a motor racing team that competed in the American Le Mans Series. The team was owned by the 2003 Indianapolis 500 winner Gil de Ferran. On August 7, 2009 de Ferran announced that he would retire from racing at the end of the 2009 season. He also planned to move the team to the IndyCar Series, but instead merged with Luczo Dragon Racing to form de Ferran Luczo Dragon Racing.

== Racing History ==
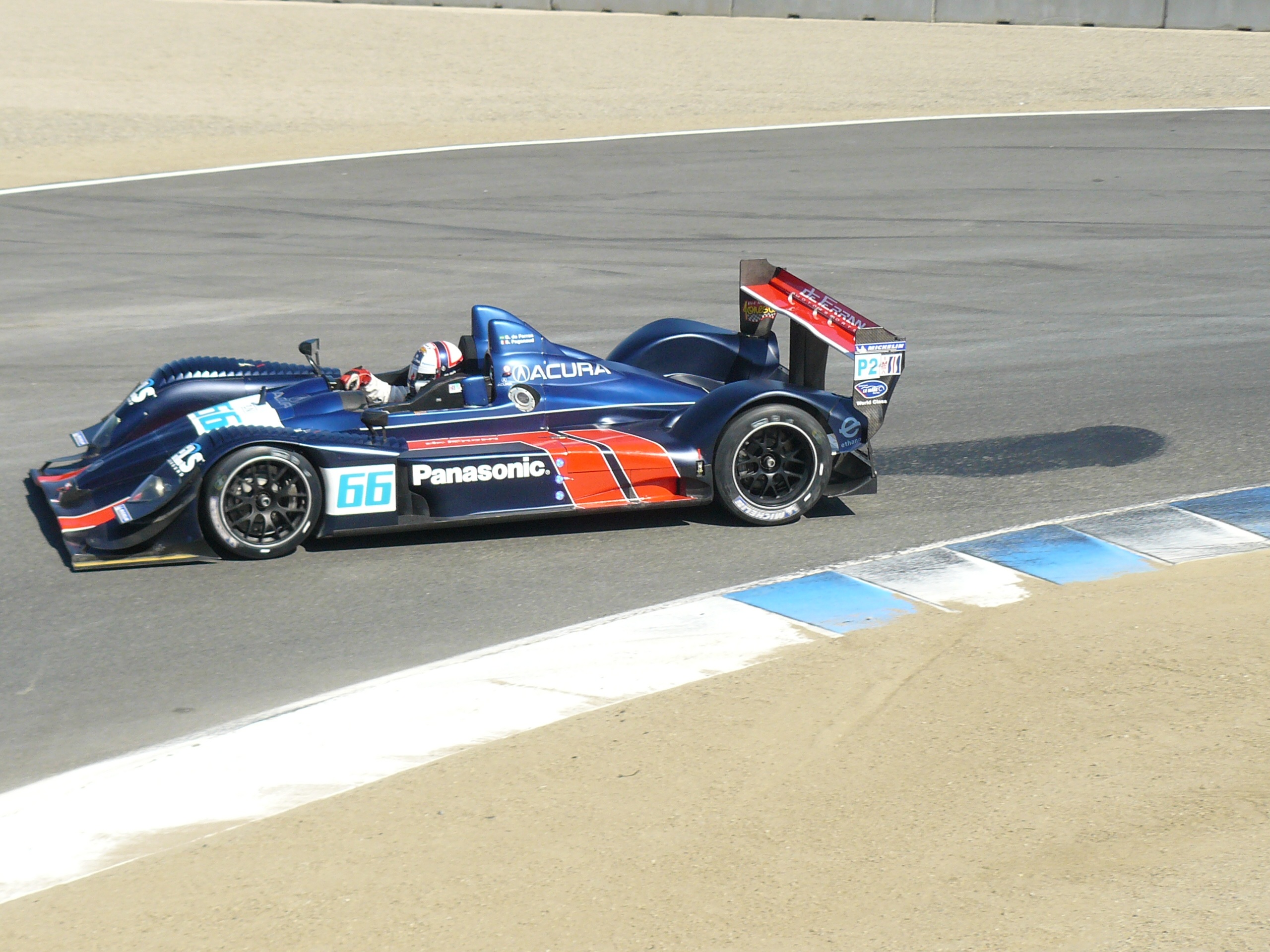
The de Ferran Motorsports Acura ARX-01b at Laguna Seca

The 2008 season started late for the team. Gil de Ferran and co-driver Simon Pagenaud's first race was the 2008 Utah Grand Prix where they finished an incredible third overall. The team, however, was unable to match their debut result for the rest of the season. A scary pit lane fire also lowered the team's confidence toward the end of the season. By season end, the team finished 6th in the teams' championship and 14th in the drivers' championship.

For the 2009 season, de Ferran Motorsports was one of two teams chosen by Honda Performance Development to campaign Acura's brand new ARX-02 LMP1 car in the American Le Mans Series. Due to the absence of Audi Sport North America, the team's main competition was de Ferran Motorsports. The team's first victory came at Long Beach, the second race of the season, which started a 4 race win streak. Also claiming the last race of the season, de Ferran Motorsports finished the season second in the teams' championship and drivers, Gil de Ferran and Simon Pagenaud 3rd in the drivers' championship.

2009 would be the last racing season for the de Ferran Motorsports team, and would also be the end of the Acura American Le Mans Series factory racing program. However, HPD would continue to develop the ARX line of LMP1 and LMP2 prototypes.
