= Patrón =

Brand of tequila products by the Patrón Spirits Company

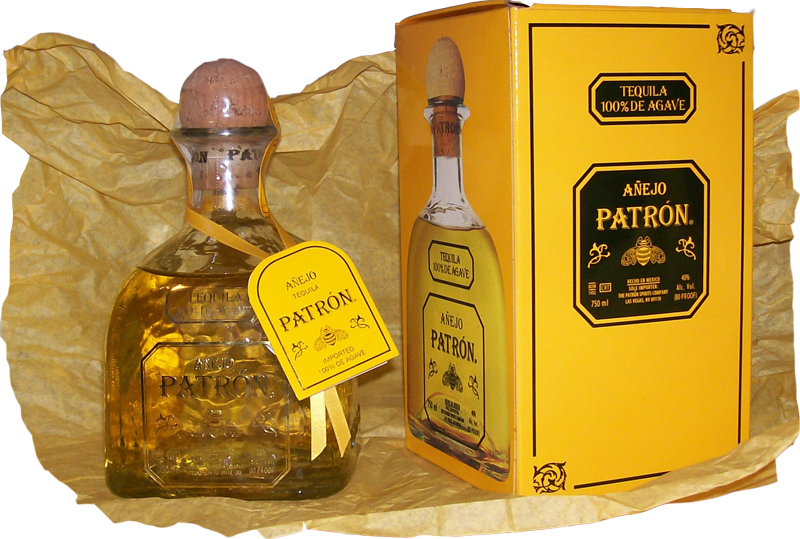
- A bottle of Patrón Añejo
- Type: Premium tequila
- Manufacturer: Bacardi (The Patrón Spirits Company)
- Origin: Jalisco, Mexico
- Introduced: 1989
- Proof (US): 80
- Variants: Añejo, Burdeos, Citrónge, Gran Platinum, Reposado, Silver, XO Cafe, XO Cafe Dark Cocoa
- Website: www.patrontequila.com

Patrón is a brand of tequila products founded by John Paul Dejoria and Martin Crowley.

Patrón Tequilas, like all tequilas, are produced in Mexico from the "corazón" (heart or core) of the blue agave plant. Everything including the barrels, corks, and bottles is handcrafted at their distilleries.

== History ==
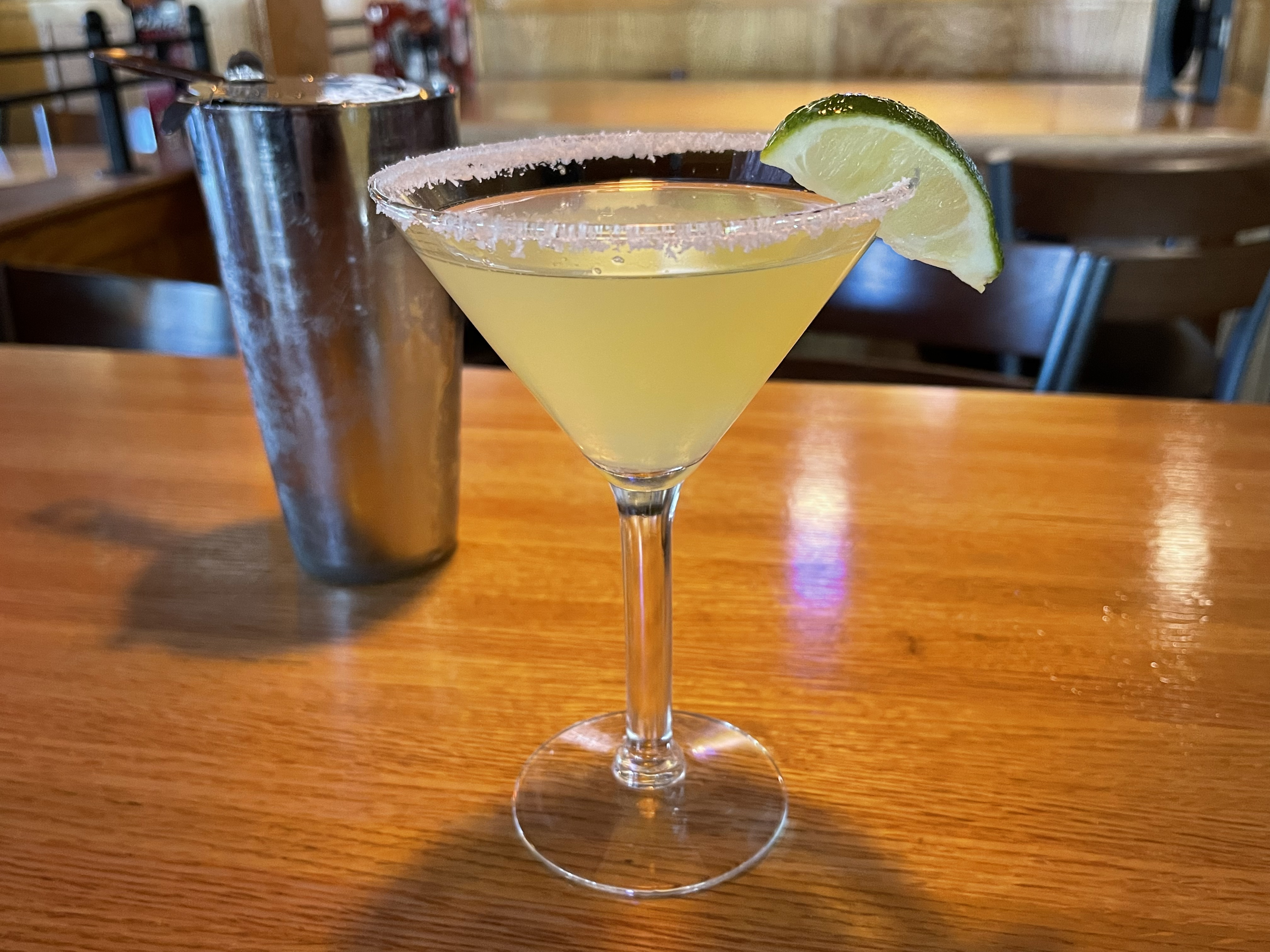
A "Perfect Patrón Margarita" at Applebee's in Napa, California.

The original Patrón Tequila was produced by Casa 7 Leguas, one of the oldest Mexican distilleries. St. Maarten Spirits (owners John Paul DeJoria and Martin Crowley) purchased the brand rights in 1989 and in 2002 production moved to a new distillery.

In 2000, Ed Brown, co-founder of Patrón and former Seagram executive, took over as CEO.

In January 2018, Patrón was sold to Bacardi, one of the world's largest privately held spirits company, for $5.1 billion.

== Advertising ==
Following the advertising strategy of Grey Goose, Patrón presented its tequila as "premium" and signaled "taste and sophistication" through individually-numbered glass bottles. The target audience is mostly vodka drinkers in nightclubs and trendy bars. Through persistent references by country music and hip hop singers, and by Lil Jon in particular, Patrón has become a fixture of popular culture.

The brand logo is set in the Algerian typeface.

== Varieties ==
Varieties include a tequila-coffee blend known as Patrón XO Cafe, a tequila-chocolate-coffee blend known as Patrón XO Cafe Dark Cocoa, and an orange liqueur known as Patrón Citrónge.

- Gran Patrón Burdeos
- Gran Patrón Platinum
- Gran Patrón Piedra
- Patrón Silver
- Patrón Añejo
- Patrón Reposado
- Roca Patrón Silver
- Roca Patrón Reposado
- Roca Patrón Añejo
- Patrón XO Cafe

Patron XO Cafe is a premium coffee flavoured version of Patron.

- Patrón XO Cafe Dark Cocoa
- Patrón XO Cafe Incendio
- Patrón Citrónge
- Patrón Lime
- Patrón Mango
- Estate Release

== See also ==
- Patrón Tequila Express
- Patron (disambiguation)
