= Scott Dixon =

New Zealand racing driver (born 1980)

Sir Scott Dixon KNZM
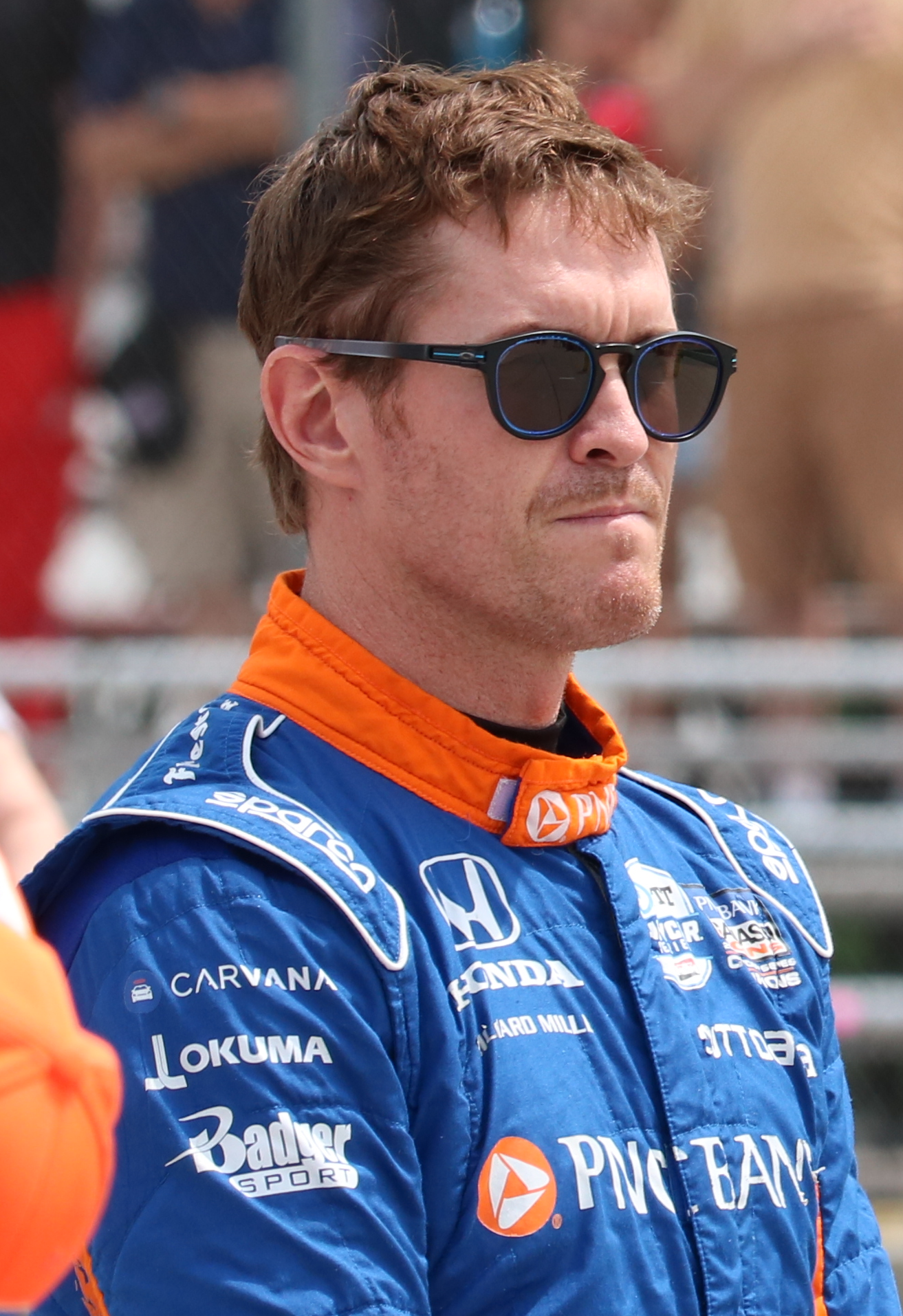
- Dixon at the 2021 Grand Prix of Road America
- Nationality: (New Zealand) New Zealander
- Born: Scott Ronald Glyndwr Dixon; 22 July 1980 (age 46); Brisbane, Queensland, Australia
- Nickname: The Iceman

IndyCar Series career
- 437 races run over 26 years
- Team: No. 6 (Arrow McLaren)
- Best finish: 1st (2003, 2008, 2013, 2015, 2018, 2020)
- First race: 2003 Toyota Indy 300 (Homestead)
- Last race: 2026 Mission Grand Prix of Monterey (Laguna Seca)
- First win: 2003 Toyota Indy 300 (Homestead)
- Last win: 2025 Honda Indy 200 (Mid-Ohio)
Wins	Podiums	Poles
59	144	32

Champ Car career
- 39 races run over 2 years
- Best finish: 8th (2001)
- First race: 2001 Tecate/Telmex Grand Prix of Monterrey (Monterrey)
- Last race: 2002 Gran Premio Telmex-Gigante (Mexico City)
- First win: 2001 Lehigh Valley Grand Prix (Nazareth)
Wins	Podiums	Poles
1	3	0

24 Hours of Le Mans career
- Years: 2016–2024
- Teams: Ford Chip Ganassi Team USA, Cadillac Racing
- Best finish: 4th (2023)
- Categorisation: FIA Platinum

Previous series
- 1994 1995–1996 1997–1998 1999–2000 2001–2002: NZ Formula Vee; NZ Formula Ford; Australian Formula Holden; Indy Lights; CART Champ Car

Championship titles
- NZ Formula Vee (1994 Class II); NZ Formula Ford (1995 Class II, 1996 Class I); Australian Drivers' Championship (1998); Indy Lights (2000); IndyCar Series (2003, 2008, 2013, 2015, 2018, 2020); IndyCar Series Oval Trophy (2011); Major victories; 24 Hours of Daytona (2006, 2015, 2020); Indianapolis 500 (2008); Petit Le Mans (2020, 2024)

Awards
- 1999, 2001, 2004, 2019 2001 2003, 2008 2008, 2013 2009 2019: Jim Clark Trophy; CART Rookie of the Year; Bruce McLaren Trophy; NZ Sportsman of the Year; MotorSport New Zealand Wall of Fame inductee New Zealand Order of Merit

Signature
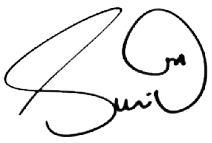

Sir Scott Ronald Glyndwr Dixon KNZM (born 22 July 1980) is a New Zealand racing driver who races the No. 6 Arrow McLaren Dallara-Chevrolet car in the IndyCar Series. Dixon has won the IndyCar Series championship six times, in 2003, 2008, 2013, 2015, 2018 and 2020, and he won the 2008 Indianapolis 500 with Chip Ganassi Racing (CGR). He is a three-time winner of the 24 Hours of Daytona, with CGR in 2006 and 2015, and in 2020 with Wayne Taylor Racing. He has also won the Petit Le Mans twice.

Dixon began karting at age seven and won thirty major karting titles in his age group across Australia and New Zealand. At the age of thirteen, he progressed to car racing, winning the 1994 New Zealand Formula Vee Championship, the 1996 New Zealand Formula Ford Class II Championship, the 1998 Australian Drivers' Championship and the 2000 Indy Lights. He debuted in Championship Auto Racing Teams (CART) in 2001 with the PacWest Racing team and won his first major open-wheel race in his third series start before joining CGR in 2002 when PacWest folded due to financial difficulties. Dixon and CGR moved to the IndyCar Series in 2003, winning the title in his debut season with three victories. Following a winless 2004 season, he won one race in the 2005, finished fourth in the 2006 with two victories, and finished second to Dario Franchitti in 2007 with four wins. Dixon won his second IndyCar championship in 2008, with five victories (including the Indianapolis 500).

Dixon finished second to teammate Franchitti in the 2009 season, breaking Sam Hornish Jr.'s all-time series wins record, and third in each season from 2010 to 2012. He won his third series championship with four victories in 2013, and finished third overall with two victories the following season. In 2015, he won his fourth IndyCar championship, tying Juan Pablo Montoya on points but being declared series champion due to a count-back on the number of victories taken by both drivers. During the 2016 and 2017 season, Dixon's form lowered but he took three wins to finish sixth and third overall, respectively. His three victories during the 2018 season earned him his fifth series championship, and he went on to win his sixth title two years later with four victories. After finishing fourth overall with one victory in 2021, Dixon improved on his performance with two wins for third in the points standings in 2022, finished runner-up in 2023 with three victories but he dropped to sixth overall with two wins in 2024. He was third overall in 2025 with one win. He dropped to 12th in 2026 with no wins and one podium at Long Beach.

Overall, Dixon has won 59 races in American open-wheel car racing and finished on the podium 144 times. Since 2004, he has also competed in endurance racing in the American Le Mans Series, the Rolex Sports Car Series, the IMSA SportsCar Championship and the 24 Hours of Le Mans as well the International Race of Champions and V8 Supercars. He was named New Zealand's Sportsman of the Year in both 2008 and 2013. Dixon was made a Member of the New Zealand Order of Merit in 2009, a Companion of the New Zealand Order of Merit a decade later and promoted to Knight Companion of the New Zealand Order of Merit (KNZM) in 2025. He is an inductee of both the Motorsports Hall of Fame of America and the Long Beach Motorsports Walk of Fame.

== Early and personal life ==
Dixon was born in Brisbane, Australia on 22 July 1980, the youngest child and only son of middle-class New Zealand expatriates Ron and Glenys Dixon. He has two older sisters. Although he was born in Australia, Dixon holds New Zealand citizenship. Dixon's parents raced various types of cars on various circuits, and owned a dirt speedway in Townsville, North Queensland. The family had moved to Australia in 1976 in search of better opportunities, settling in Townsville before returning to Auckland, New Zealand, a decade later after a major accident involving his father. Dixon attended Manurewa Central Primary, Green Meadows Intermediate and James Cook High School. He married former British and Welsh 800 metres champion and television presenter Emma Davies in February 2008. They have three children.

== Early racing career ==
Aged seven, Dixon began racing go-karts after watching his cousins race at Auckland's Mt. Wellington oval kart track and tried karting following the conclusion of a raceday. He was encouraged by his parents to pursue a racing career, and was first put into a midget car with an Ironhorse engine at age eight. Dixon was influenced by the success of New Zealand drivers Chris Amon, Denny Hulme and Bruce McLaren. Over the next six years, Dixon parents purchased additional equipment depending on circumstances and Dixon's increase in achievements. His father worked long hours importing Omega karts and cars from Japan, to finance his son's endeavours and borrowed so much money he did not inform his wife about all of it. During the following five years, Dixon won thirty major Australian and New Zealand-based karting championships in his age group, including the 1992 New Zealand Junior Restricted Championship.

Aged thirteen, he began car racing, earning dispensation from Motorsport NZ to obtain a junior competition licence to enter club and national level events in categories up to Formula Ford after lobbying by his parents. (Note: He completed a special test in order to race but almost failed the signing-off stage when he swerved his car onto the grass to avoid hitting a family of ducks crossing the circuit.) Dixon took the 1994 New Zealand Formula Vee Championship at his first attempt to become its youngest champion; He was second in the 1994 New Zealand Formula Class II Championship, and drove the 1994 NZRDC Formula Ford Winter Series. Dixon rolled a Nissan Sentra saloon car onto its roof during a race at Pukekohe Park Raceway, capturing national attention when footage showed him struggling from the upturned car with a cushion strapped to his back to reach the pedals. For the 1995–1996 season, he drove a 1600cc light, low-downforce pushrod open-wheel car in the higher-tier New Zealand Formula Ford Class II Championship, winning the category title with thirteen victories in fourteen events. Dixon's family moved him to the primary Formula Ford class in a 1992 Swift car, securing the 1996–1997 title with eight wins from fifteen starts.

With no help from Motorsport NZ, Dixon's family approached open-wheel racer Ken Smith, who became Dixon's manager and mentor in their plan to send him to the Australian Drivers' Championship's Formula Holden class. Dixon got race-by-race funding from sponsors and individuals as his family and a small group of local sponsors lost funding. He finished the fourteen-race series third in the under-powered 1991 Ralt Australia Reynard 91D–Holden car, and was named Rookie of the Year. (Note: The award for winning Rookie of the Year included a test in a V8 Supercar with the Holden Racing Team in 1997. Dixon was unimpressed with the car because of its drive-ability.) Dixon initially found it difficult to communicate with team owner Graham Watson because he was not a family member; his school recommended he stop schooling due to his good academic performance and focus on racing.

To fund his 1998 campaign, investors formed the Scott Dixon Motor Sport (SDMS) company to raise enough money to support Dixon's career until a top-team signed him, (Note: Dixon's achievements allowed him to buy his way out of the investment group, which held 60 per cent of his salary until the commitment ended in 2006.) and allowed him to be paid a salary. He was not allowed to access the Australian Institute of Sport for fitness and media training since he was not an Australian citizen. Driving the 1992 SH Racing Reynard 92D–Holden car in the twelve-round series, Dixon achieved five wins, five second-places and seven pole positions to claim the Australian Gold Star Drivers' Championship, after a season-long duel with future V8 Supercars racer Todd Kelly. He also finished second in the New Zealand Grand Prix.

In late 1998, Dixon moved to the United States and entered the Championship Auto Racing Teams' (CART) developmental series Indy Lights (today Indy NXT), hoping to reach Formula One because SDMS could not afford the more expensive European series such as British Formula 3 with Alan Docking Racing. SDMS approached Tasman Motorsports owner Steve Horne but was unable to secure enough sponsorship for Dixon to drive for the team, so Dixon was tested by Johansson Motorsports owner Stefan Johansson at Sebring International Raceway in Florida. Dixon raced for the team in the 1999 season after legal negotiations with SDMS and additional sponsorship funding. He underwent intensive training in a weighted helmet to strengthen his neck muscles to combat g-forces. (Note: Dixon attributed his smooth transition to oval track racing in the United States is heavy concentration and his position on each lap.) Dixon finished fifth in the drivers' championship in a Lola T97/20-Buick car, with one victory and four top-five finishes, and was second to Jonny Kane in the Rookie of the Year standings. In October 1999, he tested a Formula 3000 car for the Gauloises Junior Team in France, and two months later, finished second in the New Zealand Grand Prix.

After Smith left Dixon's management team post-season, Johansson became Dixon's manager, deciding if Dixon could not progress to CART in the 2001 season, Dixon would join another team. After seeing Dixon compete in Australia, media manager Brett Murray encouraged PacWest Racing's (PWR) Indy Lights development squad to employ him for the 2000 championship. Dixon accepted following SDMS' decision not to engage in direct contract talks that were done through driver Tony Renna, finalising a five-year contract with 15 days minimum testing with its CART team in April 2000. He won the title with 155 points, six victories and eight top-four finishes, becoming the series' second-youngest title winner behind Greg Moore.

== CART (2001–2002) ==
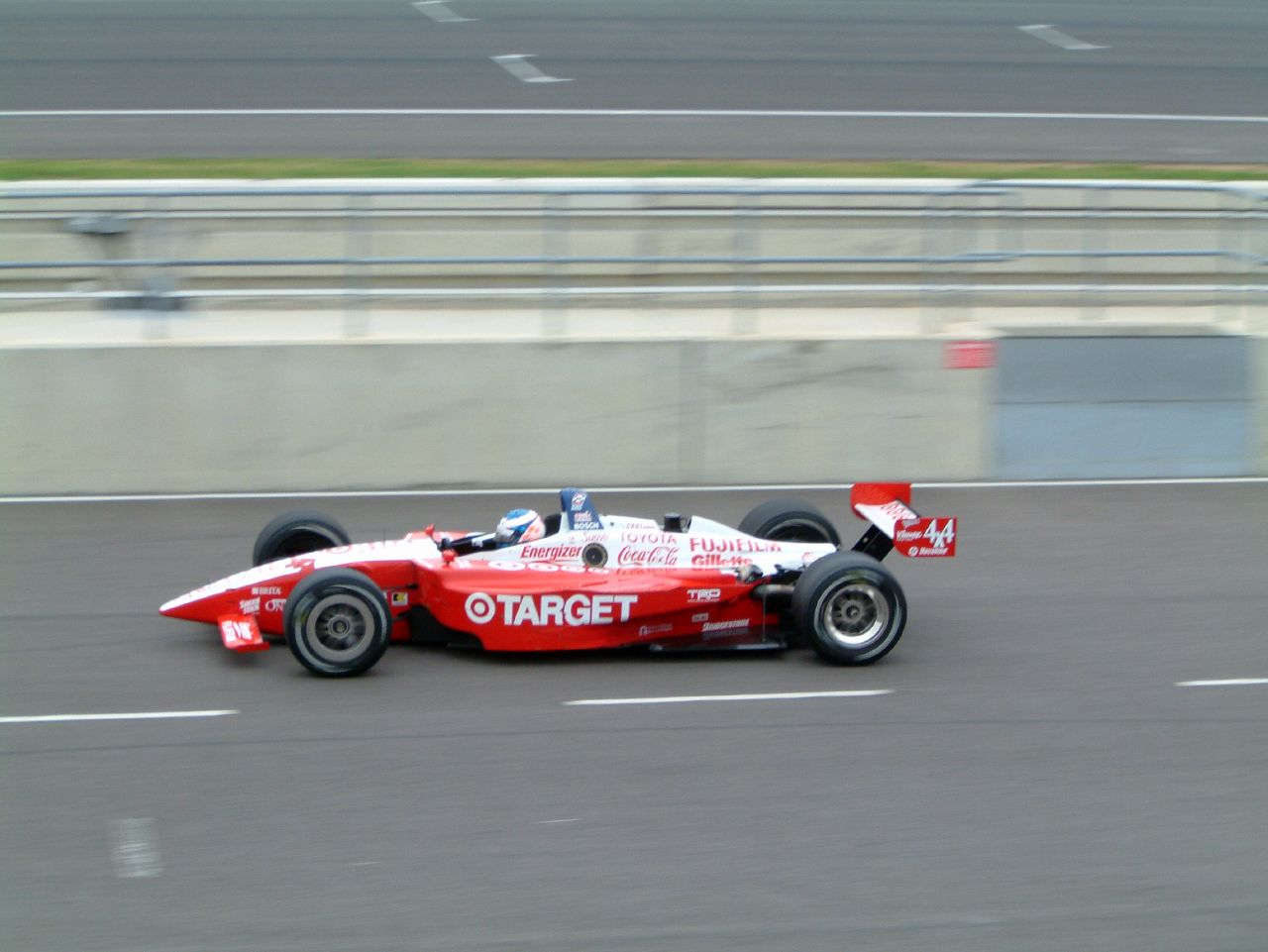
Dixon driving in the 2002 Sure for Men Rockingham 500

Dixon was promoted to CART by PacWest owner Bruce McCaw in 2001, replacing the retired Mark Blundell in PWR's No. 18 Reynard 01I–Toyota car. His team encouraged him to gain weight before the season began, and he trained with teammate Maurício Gugelmin; he was concerned about acclimating to the longer CART races and developing race strategies. Dixon won the Lehigh Valley Grand Prix at Nazareth Speedway on his third career start, driving 116 laps without stopping for fuel, becoming the youngest winner of a major open-wheel race at the age of twenty years, nine months, and fourteen days. (Note: The current holder of this record is Colton Herta, who won a 2019 IndyCar Series race at the Circuit of the Americas at eighteen years, eleven months and 25 days old.) He added another top-three finish at Milwaukee Mile and three fourth-place finishes at Chicago Motor Speedway, Road America and Laguna Seca, finishing eighth in the drivers' championship with 98 points and winning the Rookie of the Year award.

Dixon returned to the renamed PWR Championship Racing in the 2002 season, with the team switching manufacturers from Reynard to a Lola B02/00-Toyota. Dixon purposefully did not sign a long-term contract with the team so that he could switch to F1 if he impressed teams during testing. Following his two top-ten finishes at Monterrey and Motegi in the first three races, financial trouble forced PWR to disband. This prompted Chip Ganassi Racing (CGR) to sign Dixon to drive its third car for the rest of the season after discussions with his family, team owner Chip Ganassi, and engine manufacturer Toyota during preparations for the Indianapolis 500. Dixon became compatible with his teammates Bruno Junqueira and Kenny Bräck and had to learn about CGR's expectations. The rest of the season saw him achieve nine top-ten finishes including a season-best second at the Grand Prix of Denver late in the year. Dixon finished thirteenth in the final drivers' championship standings with 97 points.

== IndyCar Series (2003–present) ==
=== 2003–2006 ===
Dixon and CGR switched from CART to the IndyCar Series before the 2003 season, partly due to financial incentives and a desire to compete in the Indianapolis 500. Although he was hesitant to participate in the all-oval track series because he was a road course specialist, he quickly adapted to ovals. Dixon won his debut race, the Toyota Indy 300 at Homestead–Miami Speedway, after leading the final 53 laps. He sustained injuries in an accident with Tony Kanaan at Motegi two races later. At his first Indianapolis 500, he qualified fourth; late in the race, he lost control of his car and spun through 180 degrees, finishing 17th. Dixon took successive wins at Pikes Peak International Raceway and Richmond International Raceway and four second places in the next ten races. He entered the season-ending Chevy 500 at Texas Motor Speedway as one of five title contenders and tied on points with Team Penske's Hélio Castroneves who required a victory to win the championship. Dixon finished second, ahead of all other title contenders, to win the championship with 507 points and five non-finishes during his first full season with CGR.

In the second round of the 2004 championship, he finished second at Phoenix International Raceway, followed by a fifth-place finish in the following round at Motegi. The remaining twelve races saw him achieve seven more top-tens with his best performance during that period being a fifth place in the final round, the Chevy 500 at Texas, (Note: Dixon was required to miss the Menards A.J. Foyt 225 at the Milwaukee Mile because he sustained a chipped bone in his right thumb and a sprained left ankle in separate accidents during practice.) for tenth overall with 355 points. As Toyota began competing in the NASCAR Truck Series in 2004, many of the company's employees were moved away from IndyCar. This meant Dixon's engine became more unreliable and lacked power, causing him to be slower than drivers racing better developed Honda engines, particularly when IndyCar implemented a rule change lowering engine sizes from 3.5 L to 3.0 L at the Indianapolis 500. Dixon, according to Smith, would occasionally overdrive his car, causing handling issues entering corners.

Dixon stayed at CGR for the 2005 season after signing a contract extension to stay in IndyCar until the conclusion of the 2006 championship in May 2004. He had implants installed in the corner of his left eye to restore it to optimal sight for oval circuits, and focused fully on IndyCar following F1 testing for the Williams team in Europe and racing in the International Race of Champions (IROC) early the previous year. The beginning of the year saw him struggle in comparison with his previous two years in IndyCar with CGR. At the Indianapolis 500, he qualified in 13th position but a lap 114 two-car accident with Richie Hearn saw him finish 24th. At Watkins Glen for the Watkins Glen Indy Grand Prix, Dixon led an event-high 25 laps for his first series victory in forty races. He finished thirteenth in the drivers' championship with 321 points.

CGR switched to the ubiquitous Dallara chassis and from the underpowered Toyota engine to the more powerful Honda engine that became IndyCar's sole engine supplier for the 2006 season after Toyota left IndyCar to focus on NASCAR. He concentrated on improving his abilities on oval tracks, and learnt from teammate Dan Wheldon how to improve his performance on 1.5 mi (2.4 km) ovals. Dixon began 2006 with consecutive second-places in St. Petersburg and Motegi. He qualified fourth for the Indianapolis 500 and battled for the lead until he was imposed a drive-through penalty for blocking Kanaan, causing him to finish sixth. Dixon then won the following wet-weather Watkins Glen Indy Grand Prix, his fifth career victory, after passing Buddy Rice with nine laps left. He went on to achieve victory in the Firestone Indy 200 at Nashville Superspeedway four races later by 0.1176 seconds over Wheldon after leading the final 67 laps. Going into the season-ending Peak Antifreeze Indy 300 at Chicagoland Speedway, Dixon was one of four drivers mathematically eligible win the championship; however, he finished second and was fourth overall with 460 points.

=== 2007–2010 ===
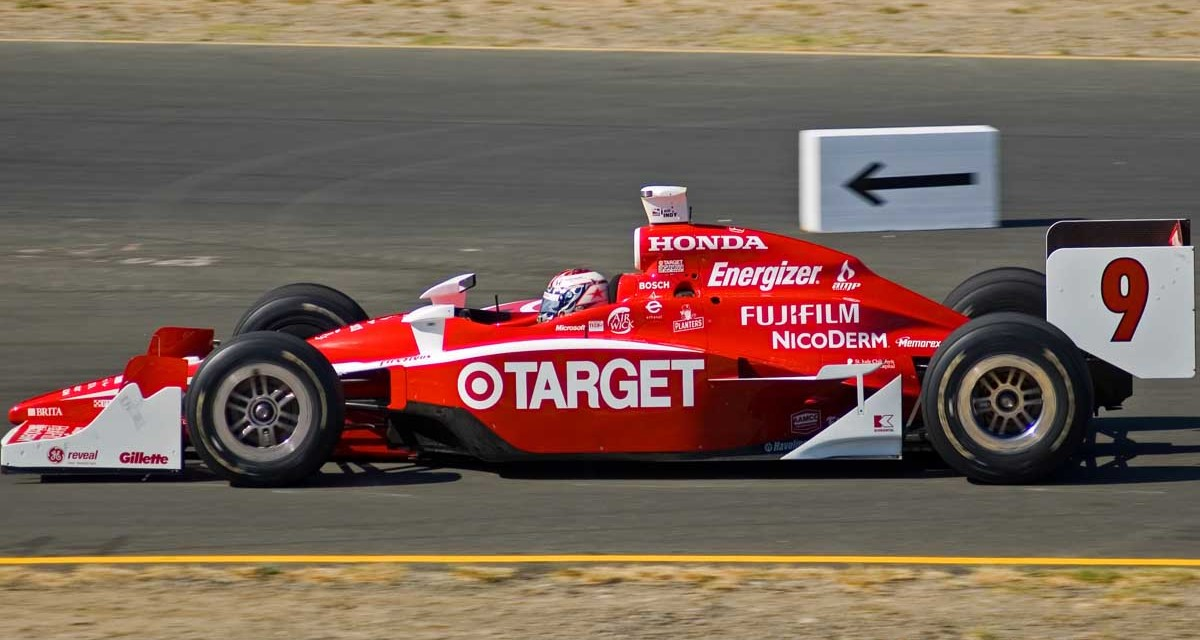
Dixon in the 2007 Motorola Indy 300 at Infineon Raceway

Dixon began the 2007 season with two podium finishes and two fourth places within the first four rounds before qualifying fourth for the Indianapolis 500 and finishing the rain-shortened race second. He won three consecutive races at Watkins Glen, Nashville and Mid-Ohio, tying a series record set by Bräck in the 1998 season and Wheldon in the 2005 championship, lowering Dario Franchitti's points advantage from 65 to 24. Dixon won the Motorola Indy 300 at Sonoma three rounds later, passing Franchitti's damaged car late in the race to take the championship lead from the latter. He was second overall with three fewer points than Franchitti going into the season-ending Peak Antifreeze Indy 300 in Chicago, and one of three competitors who could mathematically claim the drivers' championship. Late on the race's final lap, Dixon was leading when his car ran out of fuel, causing him to finish runner-up to Franchitti with 624 points.

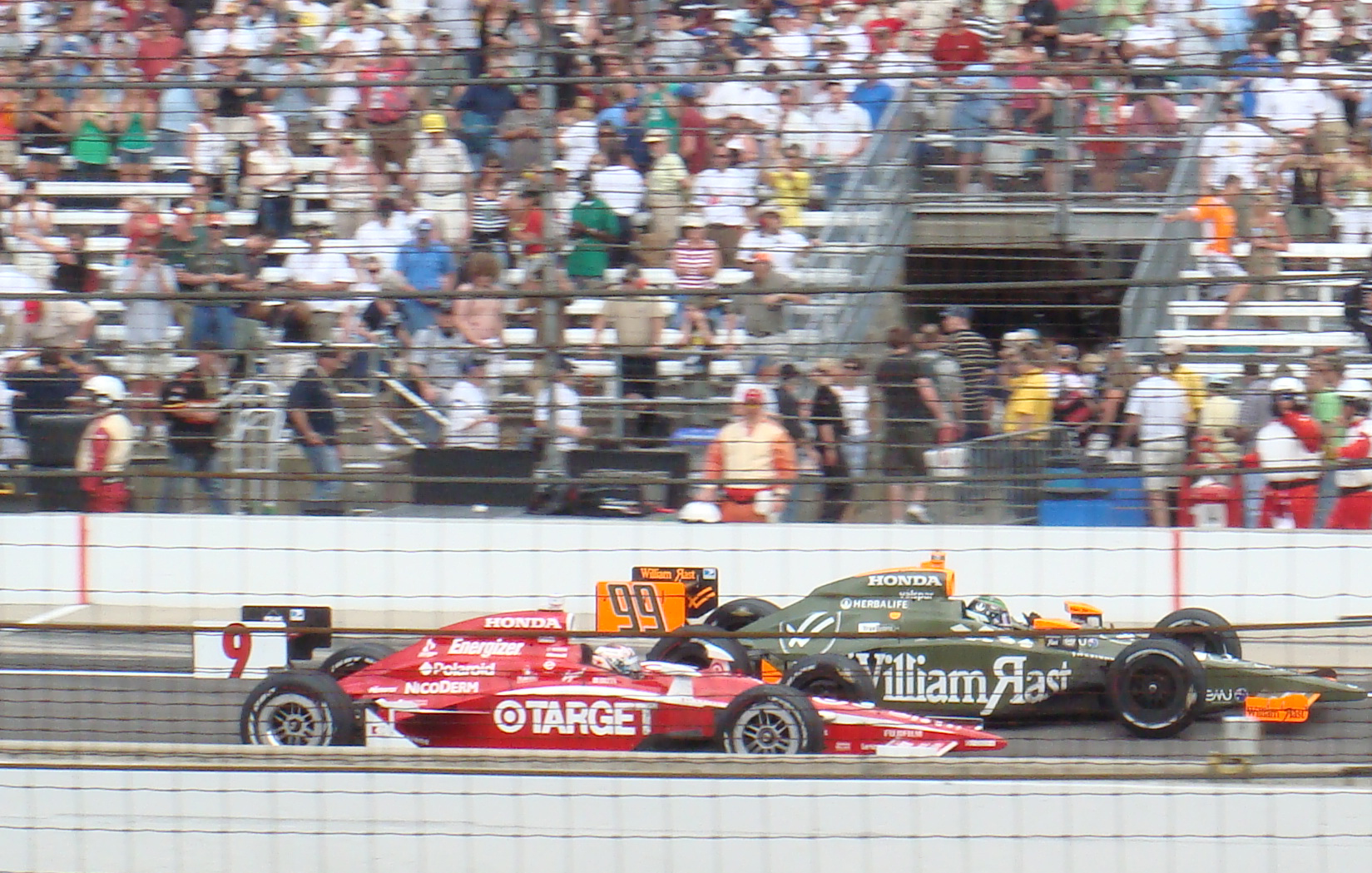
Dixon celebrating victory in the Indianapolis 500 in 2008

The 2008 season saw Dixon return to CGR, winning the season-opening Gainsco Auto Insurance Indy 300 at Homestead from pole position. After two third-places at Motegi and Kansas Speedway (from pole position), his season highlight was winning the Indianapolis 500 for the first (and only) time in his career, leading 115 laps from pole position. Dixon won the Bombardier Learjet 550 from pole position two races later in Texas, and then the rain-shortened Firestone Indy 200 in Nashville. He achieved consecutive wins in the Rexall Edmonton Indy at Edmonton City Centre Airport and the Meijer Indy 300 at Kentucky in which he led 151 laps from pole position after Castroneves ran out of fuel on the final lap. Dixon led Castroneves by thirty championship points entering the season-ending Peak Antifreeze Indy 300; he won his second series title after finishing 0.0033 seconds behind race winner Castroneves in the series' second-closest finish.

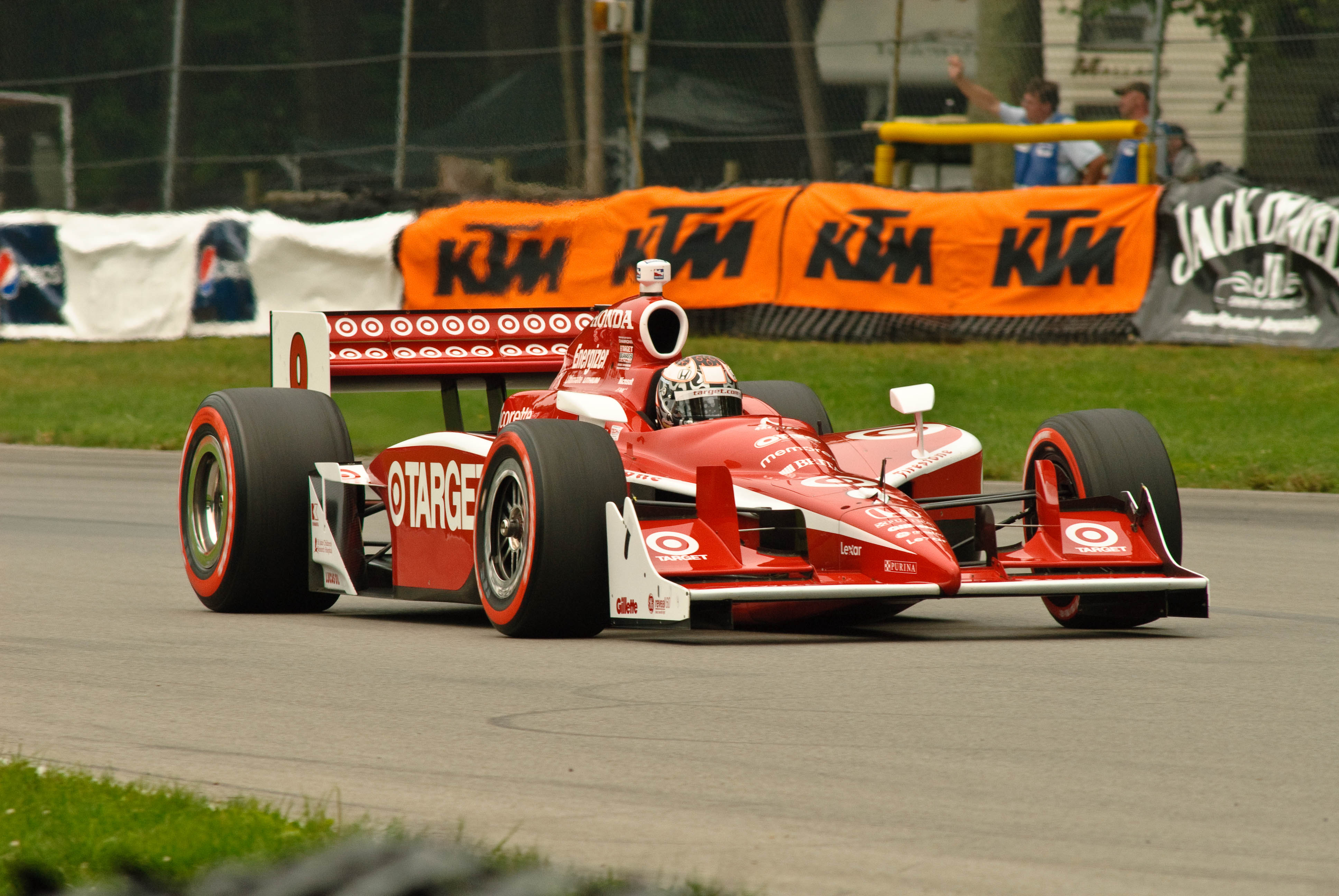
Dixon's victory in the 2009 Honda 200 meant he surpassed Sam Hornish Jr.'s all time IndyCar series wins record

For his title defence in the 2009 season, Dixon raced for CGR. Following two subpar races, he led 134 laps to win the season's third round, the RoadRunner Turbo Indy 300 at Kansas. Dixon won the ABC Supply Company A.J. Foyt 225 at Milwaukee for the championship lead two races later. At Richmond for the SunTrust Indy Challenge, he led 161 laps in his third victory of 2009, equalling Sam Hornish Jr.'s series record career wins with his nineteenth. Following his finishes at Watkins Glen and Edmonton, Dixon won his season's fourth race in the Honda 200 at Mid-Ohio, breaking Hornish's all-time victory record. His fifth and final victory of 2009 was the Indy Japan 300 at Motegi, leading 139 laps from pole position. Dixon entered the season-ending Firestone Indy 300 as one of three drivers eligible for the championship. With 605 points, he finished third in the race and was championship runner-up to teammate Franchitti.

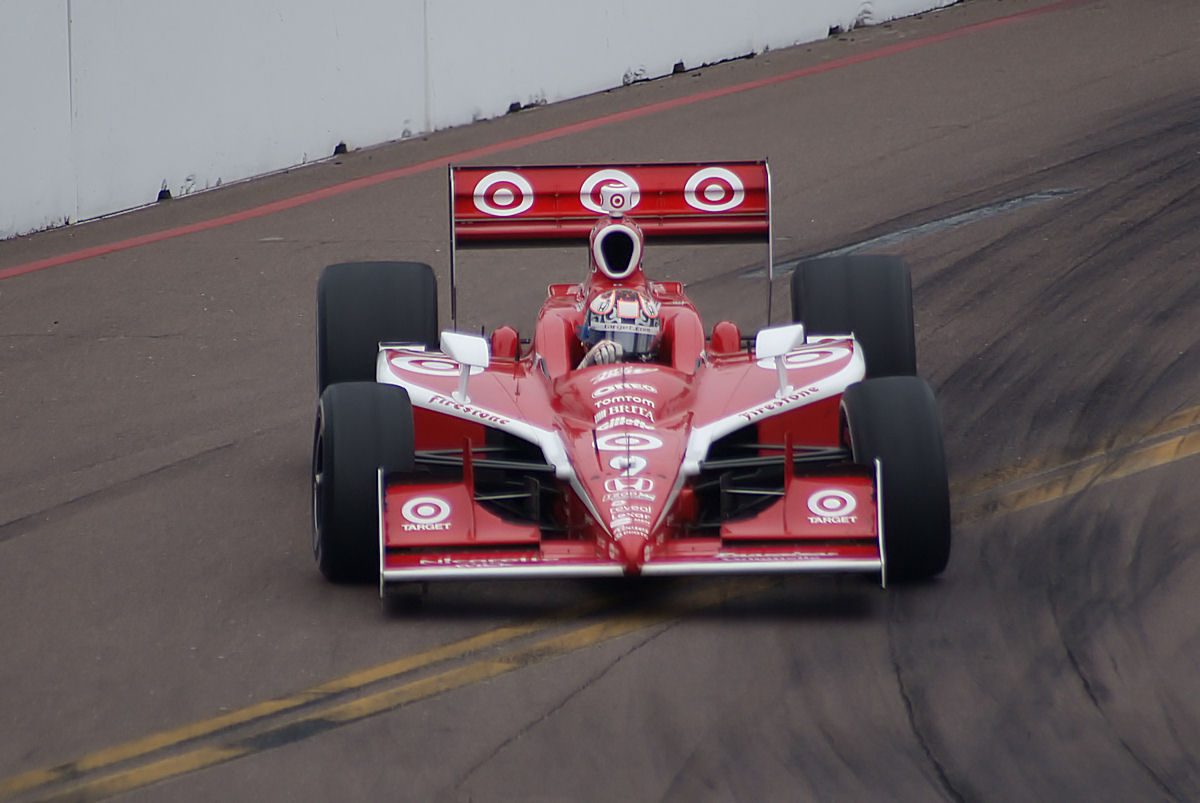
Dixon practicing for the 2010 Honda Grand Prix of St. Petersburg

Dixon's 2010 season began with three top-seven finishes in the first four races before leading 167 laps of the RoadRunner Turbo Indy 300 to win the event for the second consecutive year in Kansas. Following four top-eight finishes, he won the Honda Indy Edmonton after Castroneves was deemed to have blocked his Penske teammate Will Power. Dixon finished no lower than eighth in the five rounds that followed, including a second-place finish at Sonoma Raceway. He was mathematically eliminated from winning the championship after finishing sixth in the Indy Japan 300 at Motegi, but he finished the season by winning the 2010 Cafés do Brasil Indy 300 at Homestead to finish third overall with 547 points.

=== 2011–2015 ===
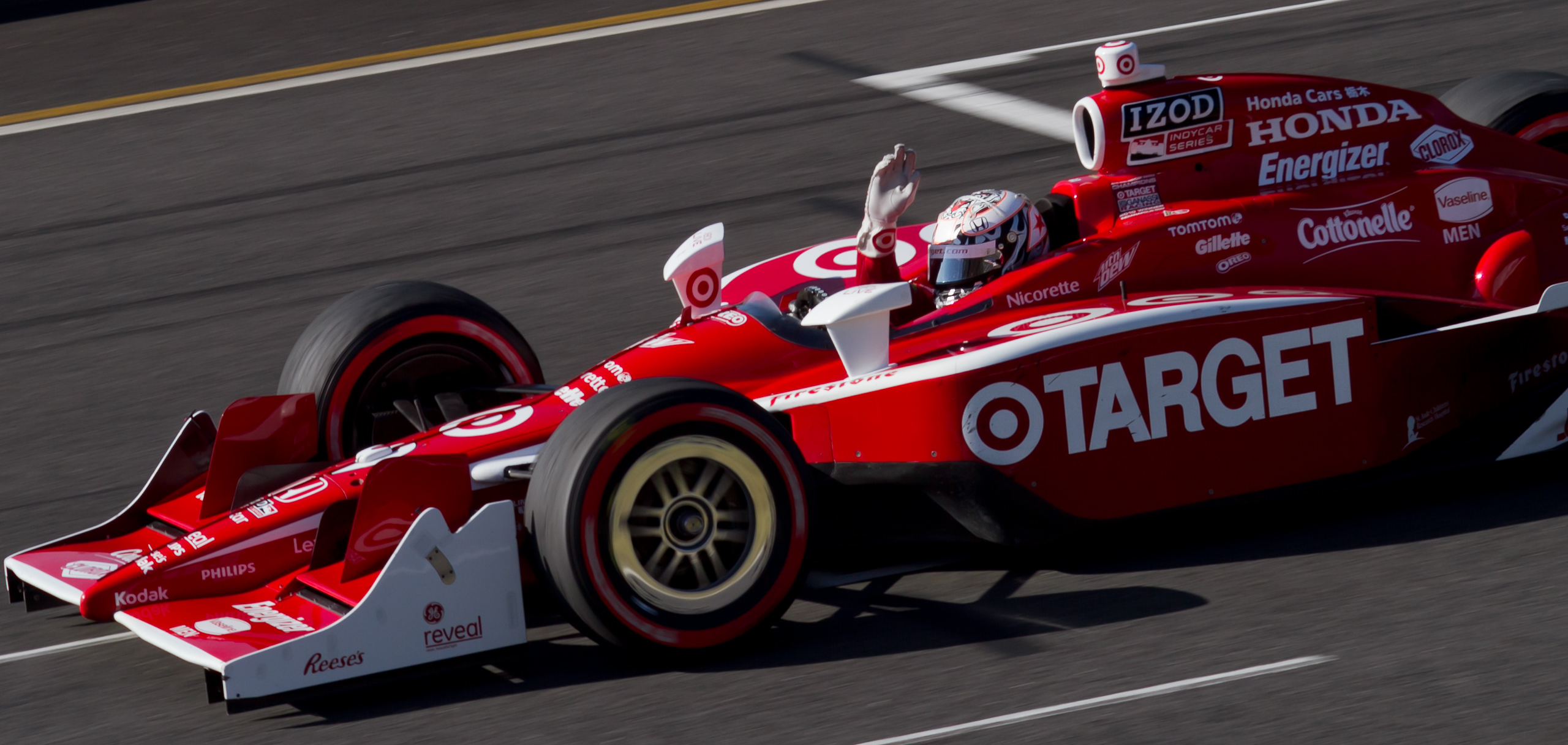
Dixon after winning the 2011 Indy Japan: The Final

In the 2011 championship, Dixon again returned to drive for CGR. During the season's first eleven races, he finished in the top ten seven times, including second-place finishes at Barber Motorsports Park, the Texas doubleheader, and Toronto. Dixon won the Honda Indy 200 at Mid-Ohio for the third time after leading fifty laps from pole position. He led 62 laps of the Indy Japan: The Final at Motegi to win the event from pole position three races later. Dixon's third-place finish in the following Kentucky Indy 300 at Kentucky allowed him to beat Franchitti to the A. J. Foyt Oval Trophy despite having no oval victories in 2011. He was third in the Drivers' Championship with 518 points.

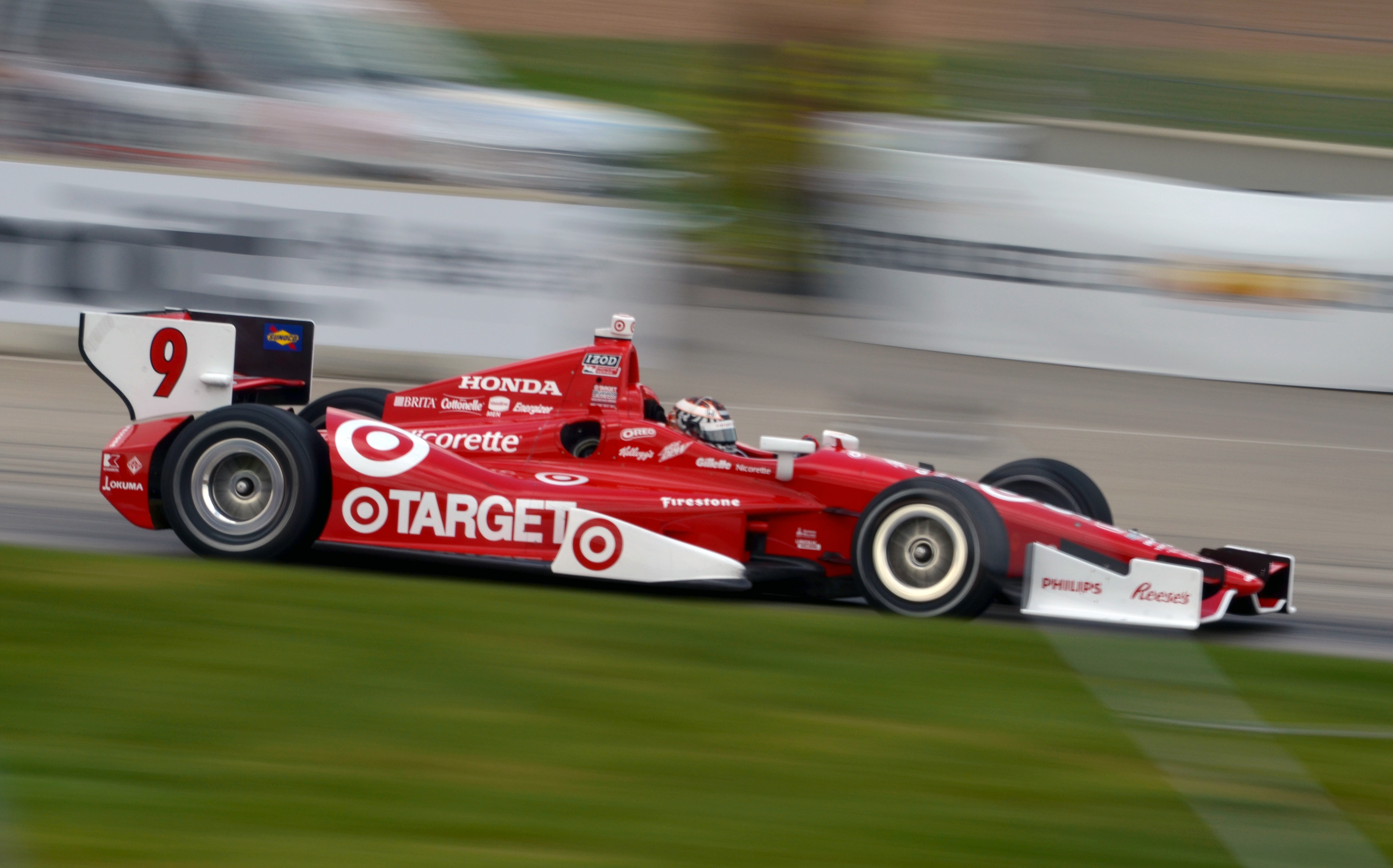
Dixon en route to winning the 2012 Chevrolet Detroit Belle Isle Grand Prix

For the 2012 season, Dixon competed for CGR; engine reliability problems affected his performance that year. Three second-place finishes in the season's first five races came at St. Petersburg, Barber, and the Indianapolis 500. Dixon won the Chevrolet Detroit Belle Isle Grand Prix at The Raceway on Belle Isle after leading every lap from pole position. Six races later, he qualified fourth for the Honda Indy 200 at Mid-Ohio, where he won his second race of the season. Dixon was one of four drivers eligible for the drivers' championship after finishing fourth in the Grand Prix of Baltimore on the streets of Baltimore. He was 53 points behind championship leader Power. He finished third in the season-ending MAVTV 500 IndyCar World Championships at Auto Club Speedway for third overall with 435 points.

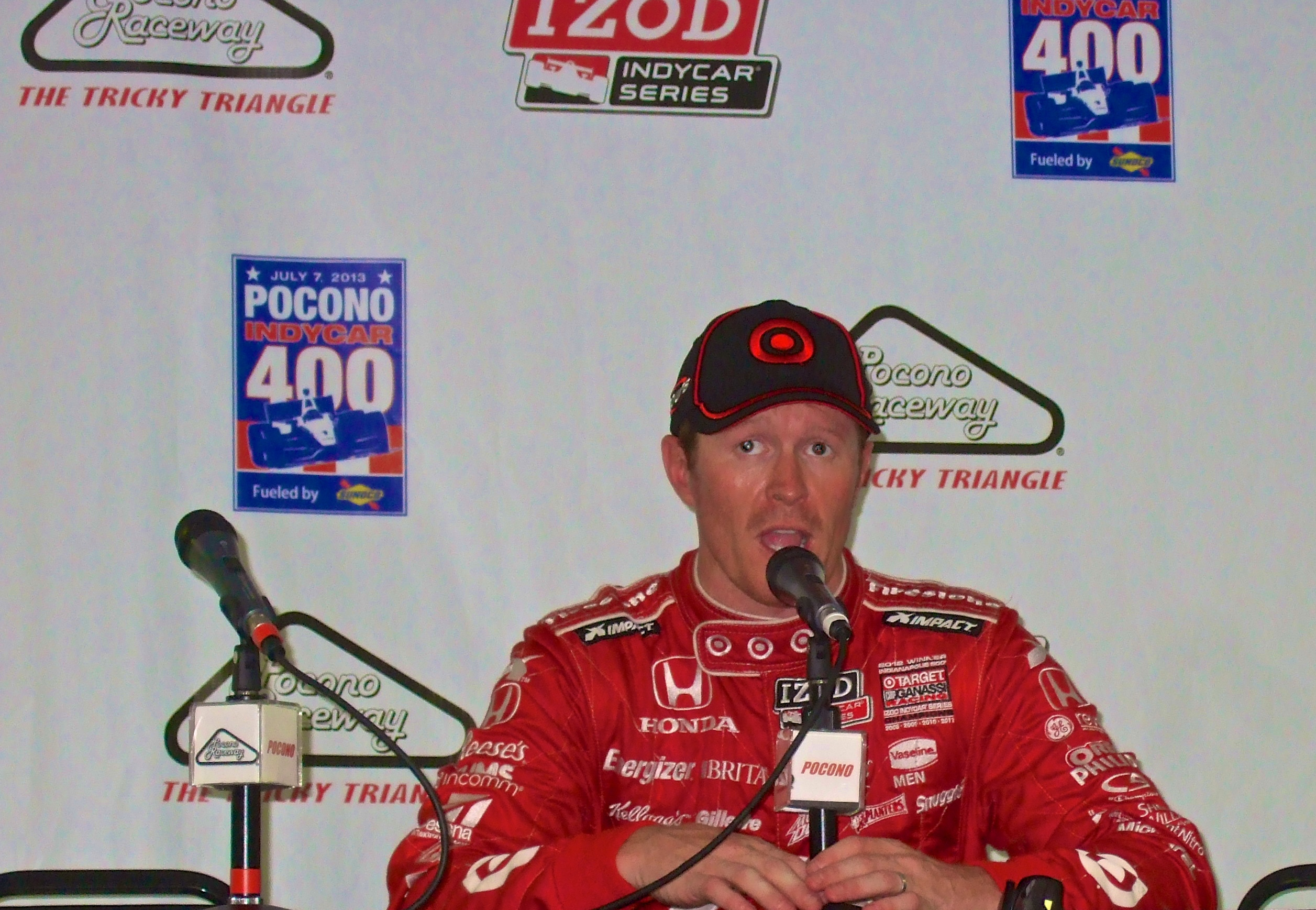
Dixon during a press conference after winning the 2013 Pocono IndyCar 400

Dixon signed a three-year contract extension to remain at CGR for the 2013 season and through to the end of the 2015 championship in mid-2012. His Honda engined car had less power than Chevrolet engined vehicles. Dixon finished second at Barber and four other times in the season's first ten rounds. He started seventeenth in the Pocono IndyCar 400 at Pocono Raceway and held off teammate Charlie Kimball for his first victory of the season. Dixon won both races of the Honda Indy Toronto doubleheader (leading 81 laps in the second event from pole position) and moved into second place in the championship standings one week later. He won the first race of the Shell-Pennzoil Grand Prix of Houston doubleheader and finished second in the second race to overtake Castroneves (who had mechanical issues) as the season-ending MAVTV 500 IndyCar World Championships at Auto Club Speedway approached. Dixon won his third series title with 577 points after finishing fifth at Auto Club.

Dixon drove a Chevrolet-powered car for the first time in the 2014 season, after CGR switched from Honda to have both the IndyCar and NASCAR teams partnered with the same engine manufacturer. His engines had a power delivery issue that slightly exaggerated shock/damper setup issues, and changes in centre of gravity and weight distribution caused traction issues exiting corners, requiring him to accelerate more cautiously. Dixon finished third once at Barber and had seven top-ten finishes in the first fourteen races of the season before winning the Honda Indy 200 at Mid-Ohio after starting 22nd. He overtook Mike Conway to win the GoPro Indy Grand Prix of Sonoma two races later. He finished third in the final championship standings with 604 points after finishing second in the season finale at Auto Club.

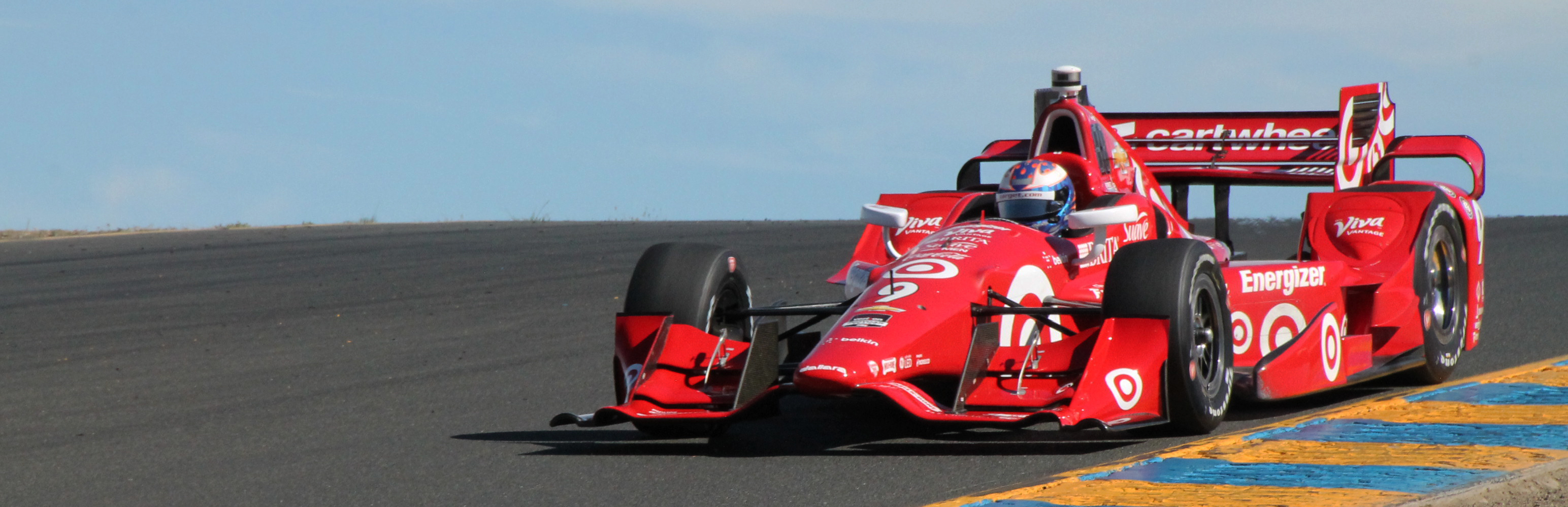
Dixon claimed his third IndyCar championship with victory in the 2015 GoPro Grand Prix of Sonoma

Dixon returned to CGR for the 2015 season. Dixon qualified third for the season's third round, the Toyota Grand Prix of Long Beach and led 44 laps to claim his first win at the event. He took pole position for the Indianapolis 500 and led 84 laps before finishing fourth due to a lack of speed late in the race. Dixon started seventh in the Firestone 600 at Texas three races later and led 97 laps in his second victory of the season. He finished fifth five times in the next six races, including a pole position at the Iowa race. Dixon was one of six drivers vying for the championship heading into the season-ending GoPro Grand Prix of Sonoma, securing the race victory and his fourth championship title. Although he and Penske driver Juan Pablo Montoya had the same number of points (556), the tie was broken by wins; Dixon won three races and Montoya won two.

=== 2016–2020 ===
Dixon drove for CGR in the 2016 season after signing a three-year contract extension with the team in mid-2015 and was outperformed by Penske engineering-wise. Dixon started seventh and led the final 155 laps of the Desert Diamond West Valley Phoenix Grand Prix at Phoenix International Raceway for his first win of the season, breaking a series record for wins in consecutive seasons with 12. Dixon had eight top-ten in the next twelve races after failing to finish three races due to unreliability and one in the Honda Indy 200 at Mid-Ohio due to an accident with Castroneves and qualifying on pole position for the race at Toronto. He won the IndyCar Grand Prix at The Glen after starting on pole and leading 50 laps. With 477 points after finishing seventeenth in the season finale at Sonoma, he finished sixth in the Drivers' Championship, the first time he finished outside the top three in points since 2005.

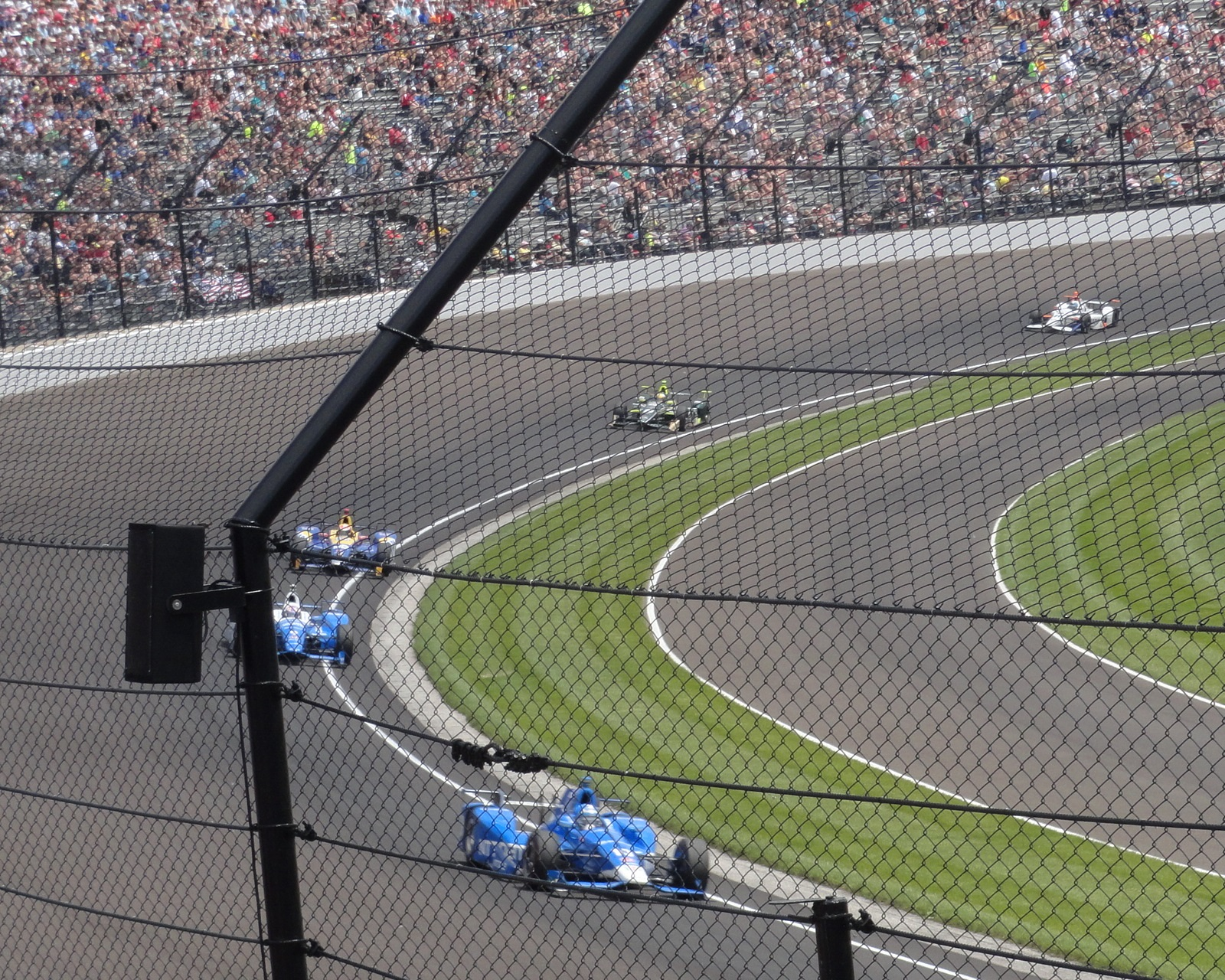
Dixon racing in the 2017 Indianapolis 500

CGR returned to Honda engines before the 2017 season after three seasons with Chevrolet. Dixon finished third at St. Petersburg, Barber, and the Indianapolis road course in his first five races. He qualified on pole for the Indianapolis 500; during the race, he crashed airborne into the inside barrier after hitting Jay Howard's left-rear wheel on lap 53. Dixon and Howard were unhurt. He took the championship lead from Castroneves by finishing second in the first race of the Chevrolet Detroit Grand Prix doubleheader, and won the Kohler Grand Prix at Road America three races later. He finished no lower than tenth in the next six races, including consecutive second places at Gateway Motorsports Park and Watkins Glen, and was three points behind championship leader Josef Newgarden heading into the season-ending GoPro Grand Prix of Sonoma. Dixon finished fourth, putting him third in the final championship standings with 621 points.

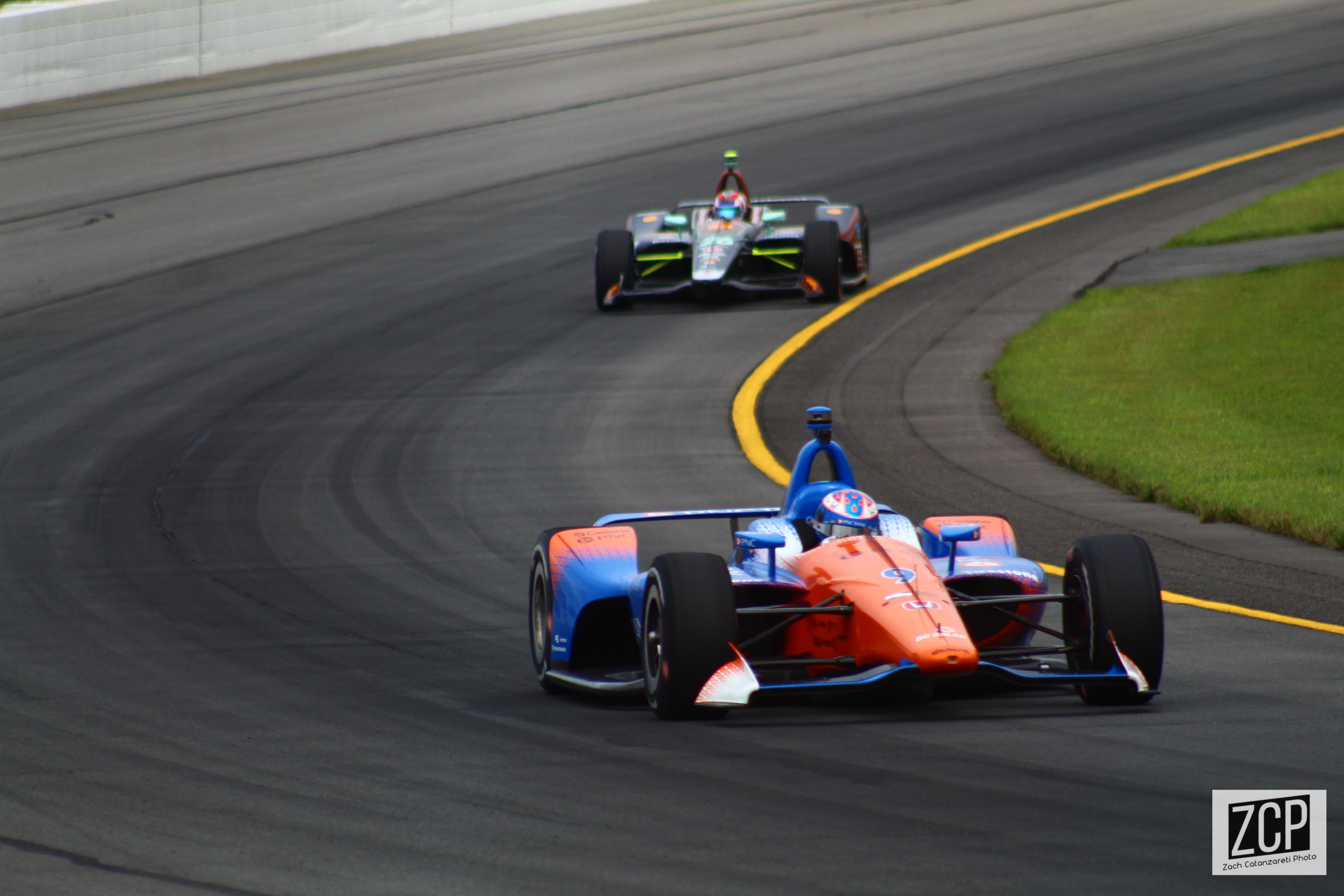
Dixon competing in the 2018 ABC Supply 500

Dixon drove a car equipped with a new universal aerodynamic car package for the 2018 season and had no technical disadvantage to Penske. He took five top-ten finishes, including consecutive podiums at the Indianapolis road course and the Indianapolis 500 in the first six races. Dixon won the first race of the Chevrolet Detroit Grand Prix doubleheader after leading 39 laps, and he led the final 119 laps of the DXC Technology 600 at Texas for the championship lead two races later. Three races after Texas, he won his third and final race of 2018, the Honda Indy Toronto. Dixon finished no lower than fifth in the year's final five races and took pole position at Gateway. He won his fifth IndyCar championship finishing second in the season-ending Grand Prix of Sonoma, scoring 678 points.

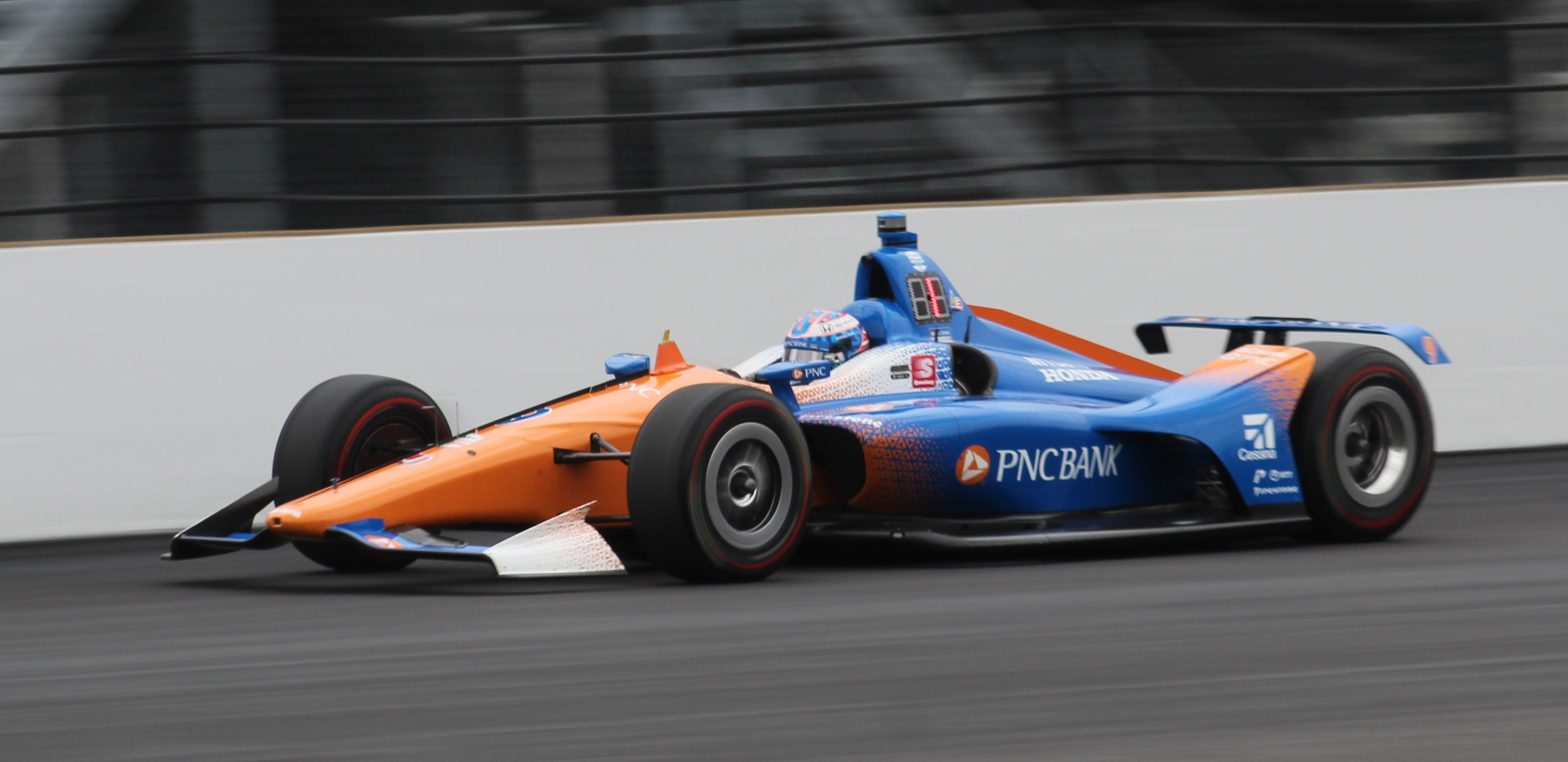
Dixon in the lead of the 2019 Indianapolis 500

Dixon signed a multi-year contract extension with CGR through to the end of the 2023 season after rejecting an offer from McLaren CEO Zak Brown to join the brand's IndyCar team for a rumoured three seasons before the 2019 championship. The season's first seven races yielded four podium finishes in St. Petersburg, Barber, Long Beach and the Indianapolis road course. Dixon won the second race of the Chevrolet Detroit Grand Prix doubleheader after starting sixth. Following four top-five finishes, he held off teammate Felix Rosenqvist to win the Honda Indy 200 from eighth, his second and final victory of 2019 and sixth at Mid-Ohio. Dixon finished fourth in the final Drivers' Championship standings with 578 points after finishing on the podium twice more at Pocono and Laguna Seca.

The worldwide COVID-19 pandemic delayed and shortened the 2020 season to fourteen events, and Indiana's lockdown required Dixon to prepare at home for the return to racing. At the season-opening Genesys 300 round in Texas, he qualified second and led 157 of 200 laps, matching A. J. Foyt's record of eighteen seasons with a victory. Dixon then won the GMR Grand Prix at the Indianapolis road course and the first race of the REV Group Grand Prix doubleheader at Road America. He finished second in the first race of the Iowa doubleheader and led a race-high 111 laps in the Indianapolis 500. Dixon took his 50th career win in the opening round of the following Bommarito Automotive Group 500 doubleheader at Gateway. He finished no lower than tenth in the final five races, and won his sixth drivers' championship by 16 points over Newgarden in the season-ending Grand Prix of St. Petersburg, finishing third.

=== 2021–present ===
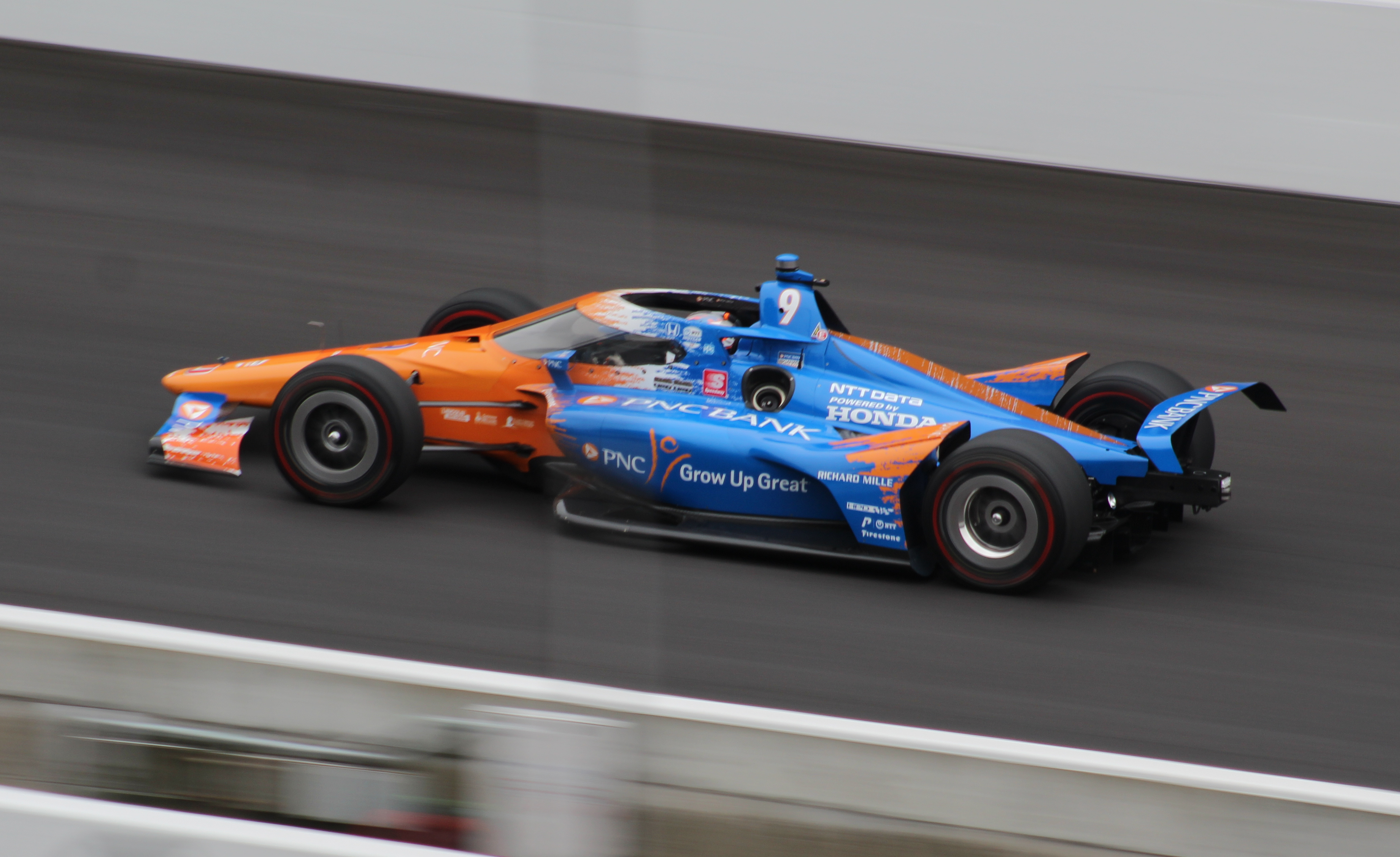
Dixon racing in the 2021 Indianapolis 500

Dixon started the 2021 championship by finishing third at Barber and St. Petersburg. He started third for the first race of the Genesys 300 doubleheader at Texas, leading 206 of 212 laps in his first and only victory of the year to take the championship lead and surpass Foyt's record of winning a race in the most seasons during his 19th season. Dixon took two pole positions in the second Genesys 300 round and the Indianapolis 500 but lost the championship lead to teammate Álex Palou after finishing seventeenth in the latter event. He took three more podiums and four top-tens and was fourth in the final season standings with 481 points.

Dixon finished in the top ten in each of the first five races of the 2022 season, with a best result of fifth place at Texas. He qualified on pole for the fifth time in the Indianapolis 500. Dixon led 95 laps but failed to win the race due to a drive-through penalty for overspeeding by 1 mph (1.6 km/h) in the pit lane following his final pit stop. Four races later, he started second in the Honda Indy Toronto and led 40 laps to claim his fourth Toronto victory. Dixon won the Big Machine Music City Grand Prix four races later on the streets of downtown Nashville. He was one of five drivers mathematically eligible to win the championship heading into the season finale, the Firestone Grand Prix of Monterey at Laguna Seca. A lack of speed in the race restricted him to twelfth and he was fourth in the championship standings with 521 points.

Dixon started the 2023 season improving his performance in qualifying from the year before, and securing a third position at St. Petersburg and top ten finishes in the three of the next four races as a result of a byproduct of an engineering and strategy team reshuffle. A rare retirement following contact with Pato O'Ward at Long Beach put Dixon in a deficit for championship points. After Dixon and his crew began developing more and he and his timing team began understanding their own needs, Dixon's results improved. He extended his record streak of consecutive seasons with at least one race victory to nineteen by winning the Gallagher Grand Prix while on an alternative strategy following a first-lap spin; he also surpassed Kanaan's record of consecutive IndyCar starts in the same race. Dixon then led 82 laps of the following Bommarito Automotive Group 500 to win and become teammate Palou's only championship rival after Newgarden crashed. He was mathematically eliminated from title contention after finishing third at the BitNile.com Grand Prix of Portland, which Palou won, but he did secure second in the Drivers' Championship. He overcame a drive-through penalty for contact on the first lap to end the season with a victory in the Firestone Grand Prix of Monterey.

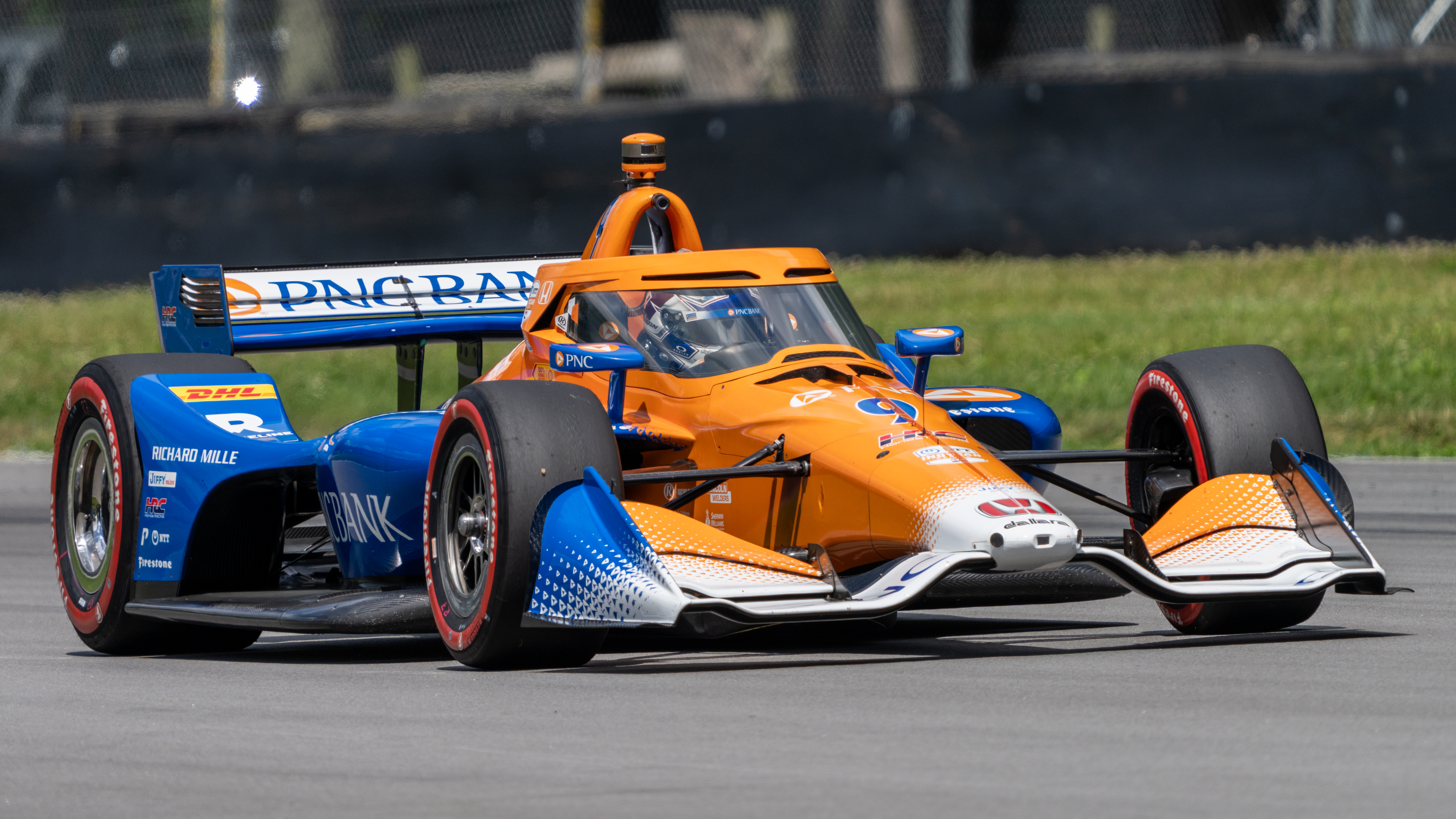
Dixon at Mid-Ohio in 2024

At the second round of the 2024 season, the Grand Prix of Long Beach, Dixon employed a fuel-saving strategy for more than half the race following a yellow flag caution period to win the event for the second time. After two more top six finishes in the following three races with sub-par performances in qualifying, he won the Chevrolet Detroit Grand Prix through another fuel-saving strategy and holding off Marcus Ericsson to take the championship lead from teammate Palou. Although he lost the realistic prospect of winning his seventh drivers' title after an accident at the Grand Prix of Portland, his second-place finish in the second race of the Hy-Vee Milwaukee Mile 250s moved him past Mario Andretti for the record of most career IndyCar podiums with his 142nd. Dixon was sixth in the points standings with 456.

Dixon commenced the 2025 season by finishing second at the season-opening Firestone Grand Prix of St. Petersburg after a faulty radio forced him to remain on the track for one lap longer than CGR wanted. Dixon achieved five more top ten finishes over the course of the next eight races. At the Honda Indy 200 at Mid-Ohio, he achieved his first victory of the season after his teammate Palou ran wide onto the grass with six laps remaining. The rest of the season yielded five more top-ten finishes in the final seven races, which included a second-place finish in the second race of the Sukup IndyCar Race Weekend. Dixon was third in the drivers' standings with 452 points.

He thought of leaving CGR during a visit to New Zealand in October 2025 and began talks with Ganassi in June 2026. On July 2, 2026, CGR confirmed that Dixon would be leaving the team at the end of that season. Four days later, it was announced that Dixon would be joining Arrow McLaren beginning with the 2027 season, alongside 2026 Indianapolis 500 winner Felix Rosenqvist (who previously drove for the team) and the incumbent Pato O'Ward. He ended the 2026 season 12th overall with 331 points and no wins, ending his streak of 21 consecutive seasons with a race victory for his first winless season since 2004. It was further announced by Arrow McLaren that he will drive the No. 6 Chevrolet in 2027.

== Sports car career ==
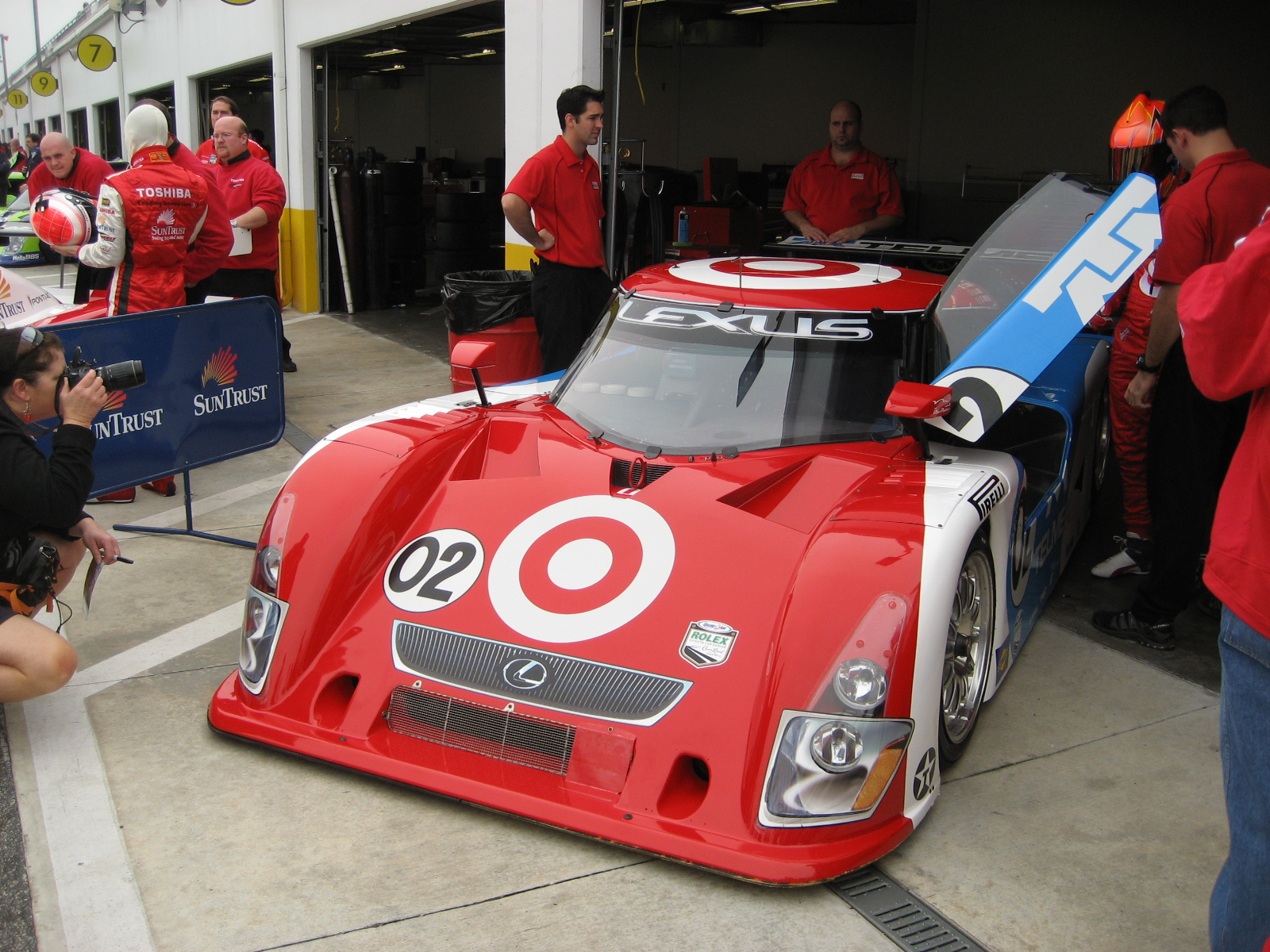
The No. 2 Riley-Lexus Dixon shared with Salvador Durán, Alex Lloyd and Dan Wheldon at the 2008 24 Hours of Daytona

Dixon made his endurance racing debut in the 1999 Petit Le Mans (part of the American Le Mans Series), retiring the No. 36 Ferrari 333 SP LMP class car he shared with Johansson and Jim Matthews due to gearbox problems. He competed in the 2004 24 Hours of Daytona (part of the Rolex Sports Car Series) with Jimmy Morales, Max Papis, and Scott Pruett, finishing sixth in class and tenth overall in CGR's No. 1 Riley MkXI-Lexus Daytona Prototype (DP). Dixon went on to finish third in the Lexus Grand American 400 alongside Darren Manning. The following year, he again drove the 24 Hours of Daytona in Chip Ganassi Racing with Felix Sabates' (CGRFS) No. 3 entry, finishing sixth with Manning and Casey Mears. Dixon, Mears and Wheldon won the 2006 24 Hours of Daytona, completing 734 laps in CGRFS' No. 2 Riley-Lexus. He finished fourth in the season-ending Discount Tire Sunchaser at Miller Motorsports Park, alongside co-drivers Luis Díaz and Pruett in the No. 1 entry.

Dixon entered the 24 Hours of Daytona with Memo Rojas and Wheldon in 2007, retiring after 538 laps when Rojas crashed the No. 2 car on the saturated track in the 21st hour for 21st in class and 41st overall. He raced alongside Salvador Durán, Alex Lloyd, and Wheldon in the 2008 24 Hours of Daytona, finishing 41st overall (eighteenth in class) after 515 laps due to three crashes. Dixon finished fifth in class and eighth overall in De Ferran Motorsports' No. 66 Acura ARX-01b in the 2008 Petit Le Mans Le Mans Prototype 2 (LMP2) category alongside Gil de Ferran and Simon Pagenaud. He, Franchitti and Lloyd were fifth in the 2009 24 Hours of Daytona in CGRFS' No. 2 Riley-Lexus car. Dixon co-drove De Ferran Motorsports' No. 66 Acura ARX-02a Le Mans Prototype 1 (LMP1) car with De Ferran and Pagenaud in both the 12 Hours of Sebring and the Petit Le Mans. He qualified on pole in Sebring but did not finish due to mechanical issues and was 24th in Petit Le Mans.

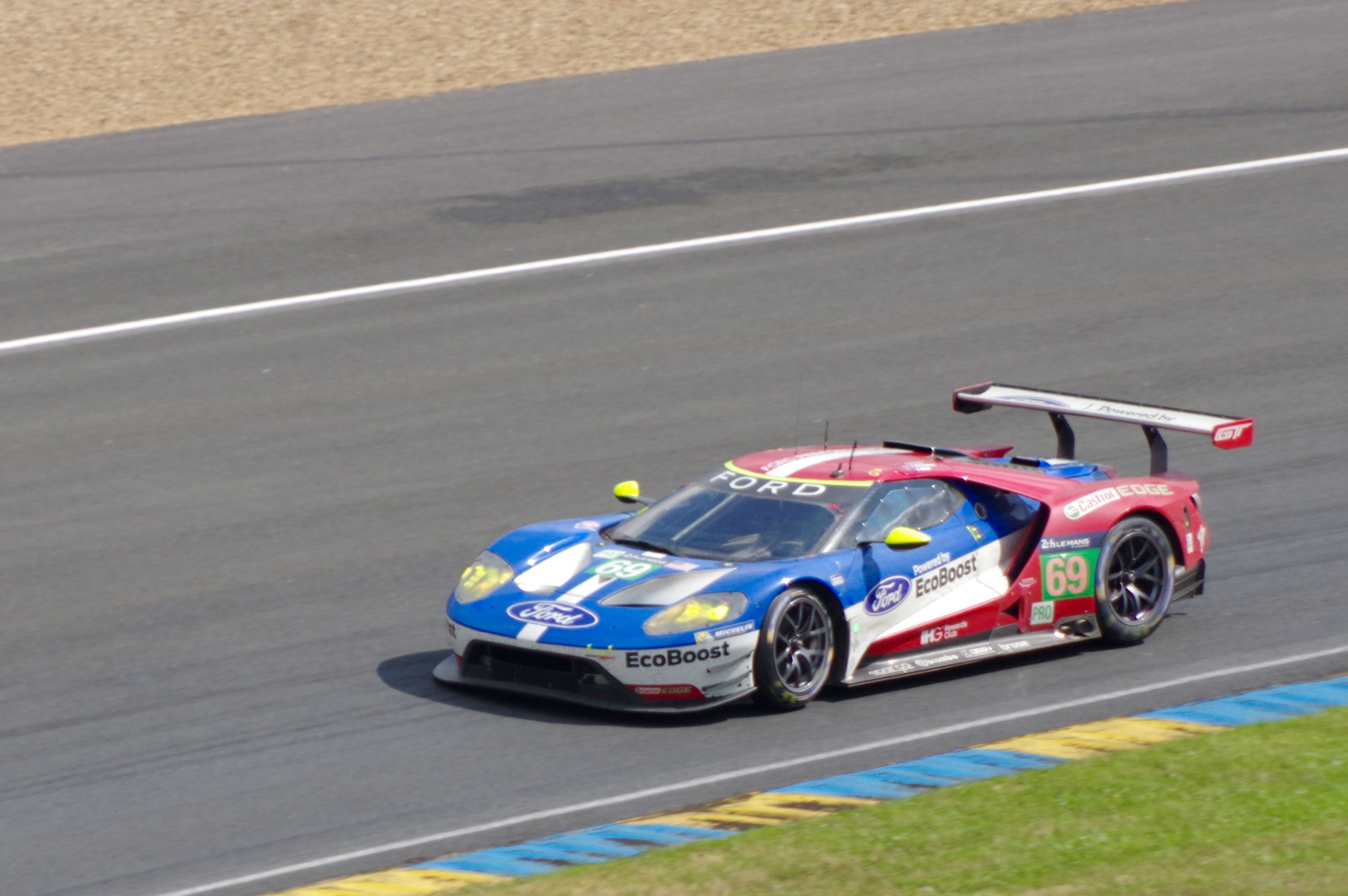
The No. 66 Ford GT of Ryan Briscoe, Dixon and Richard Westbrook that finished third in the LMGTE Pro class of the 2016 24 Hours of Le Mans

Dixon competed in the 24 Hours of Daytona from 2010 to 2012, sharing the No. 2 Riley MkXX-BMW with Franchitti, Jamie McMurray, and Montoya. They finished 37th in 2010 due to mechanical failure, but finished second and fourth in 2011 and 2012, respectively. In July 2012, Dixon, McMurray, and Montoya returned to the Rolex Sports Car Series for the three-hour Brickyard Grand Prix at Indianapolis in CGRFS' No. 2 car, finishing fourth. Although Dixon, Franchitti, Joey Hand and McMurray were 37th in the 2013 24 Hours of Daytona due to McMurray's accident following a pit stop, he and Franchitti were third in the Continental Tire Sports Car Festival. In 2014, he, Marino Franchitti, Kanaan, and Kyle Larson finished eighth in class and fifteenth overall in the 24 Hours of Daytona after mechanical issues, and sixth in the 12 Hours of Sebring with Kanaan and Sage Karam. Dixon joined Pruett and Rojas at the No. 1 team for the season-ending Petit Le Mans, finishing third.

Dixon, Kanaan, Larson and McMurray won the 2015 24 Hours of Daytona, completing 740 laps in the No. 2 CGRFS Riley-Ford car. Dixon was paired with Hand and Pruett to CGRFS's No. 1 lineup for both the 12 Hours of Sebring and the Petit Le Mans, finishing fourth in both races. Dixon was joined by Kanaan, Larson, and McMurray for the 2016 24 Hours of Daytona; brake issues caused Larson to crash, leaving the No. 2 car thirteenth overall. He raced Ford CGR's No. 67 Ford GT alongside Ryan Briscoe and Richard Westbrook in the 12 Hours of Sebring and the Petit Le Mans as well as the No. 69 car in the Le Mans Grand Touring Endurance Professional (LMGTE Pro) 24 Hours of Le Mans for the next three years. The trio's best Le Mans LMGTE Pro class finish was third in 2016, and they won the GTLM category of the 2018 24 Hours of Daytona after 783 laps.

In 2020, Dixon entered the 24 Hours of Daytona, this time with Wayne Taylor Racing (WTR). The No. 10 Cadillac DPi-V.R he shared with Briscoe, Kamui Kobayashi and Renger van der Zande won in a record-breaking 833 laps. Dixon finished sixteenth overall in the Bathurst 12 Hour with R-Motorsport's No. 76 Pro class Aston Martin Vantage AMR GT3 he shared with Jake Dennis and Rick Kelly one week later. He, Briscoe and Van Der Zande won the Petit Le Mans and were seventh in the 12 Hours of Sebring with WTR. Dixon finished fifth in both the 24 Hours of Daytona and the 12 Hours of Sebring in 2021, driving the No. 1 Cadillac CGR DPi-V.R with Kevin Magnussen and Van Der Zande. He, Earl Bamber and van Der Zande were fifth in the season-ending Petit Le Mans. In the 2022 24 Hours of Daytona, he finished seventh in class and fourteenth overall in the No. 1 car alongside Sébastien Bourdais, Palou, and van Der Zande; he missed the 12 Hours of Sebring because of an IndyCar commitment at Texas and was replaced by Ryan Hunter-Reay. He finished fourth in the season-ending Petit Le Mans alongside Bourdais and van Der Zande.

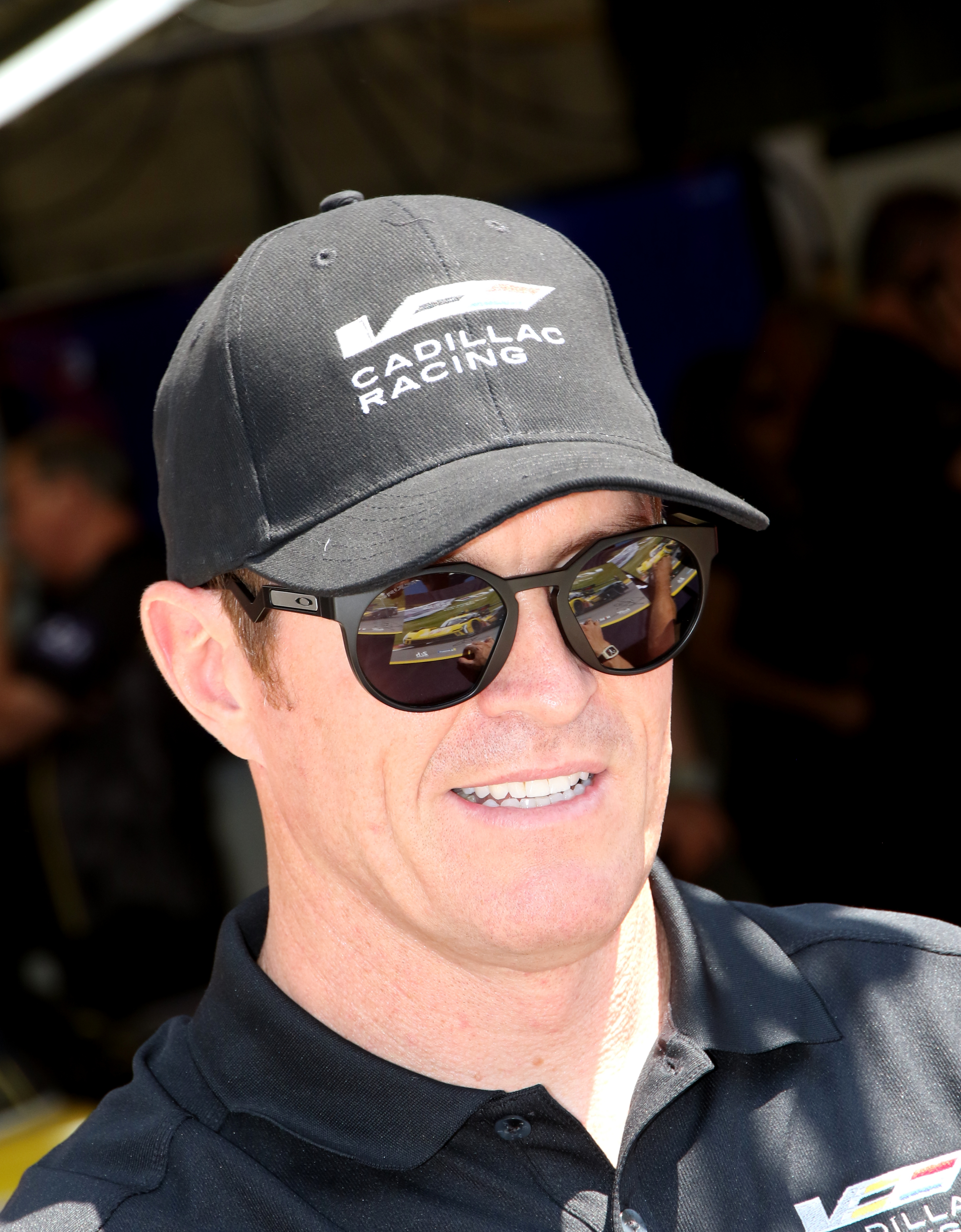
Dixon in the pitlane at the 24 Hours of Le Mans in 2023.

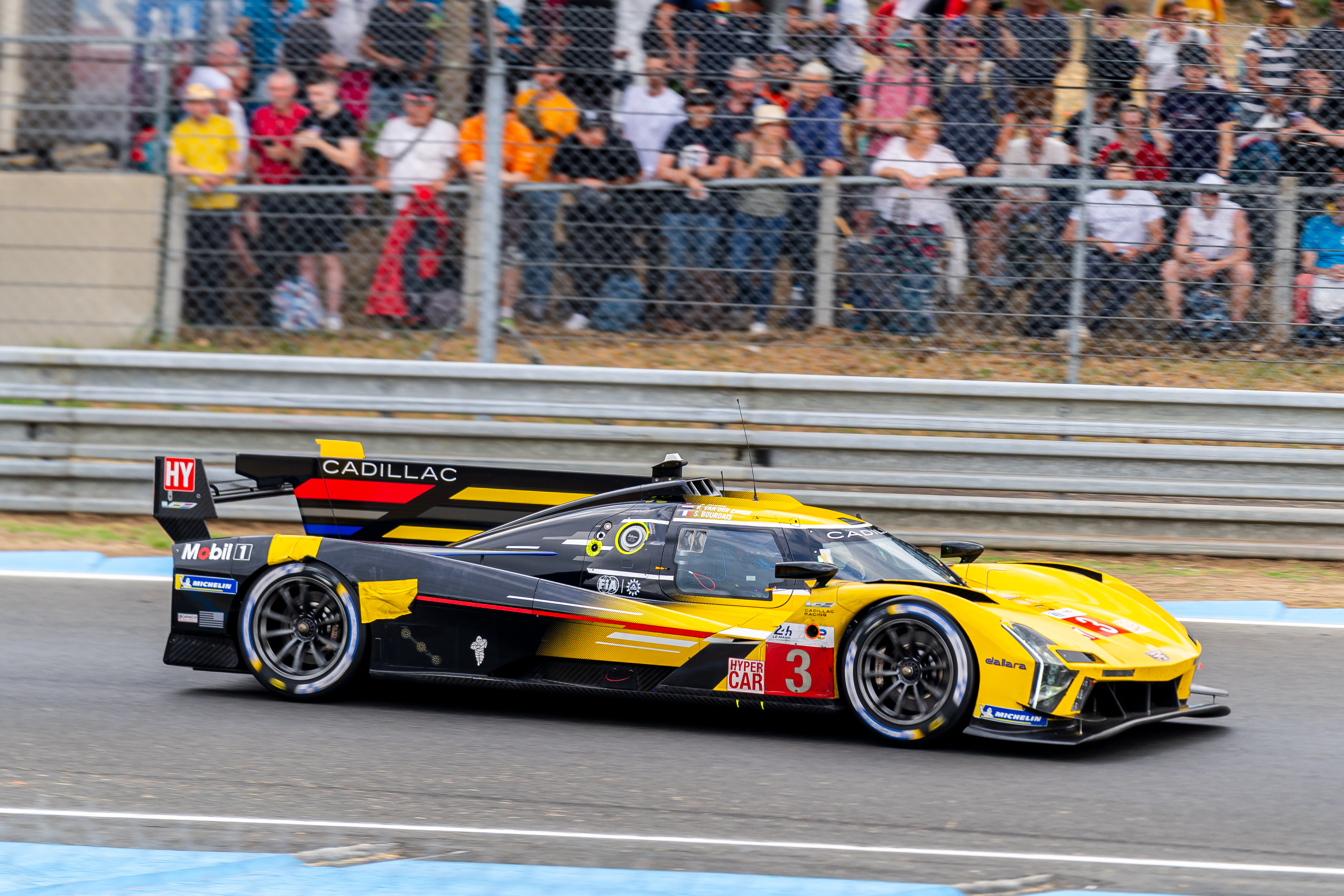
Dixon competing during the 2023 24 Hours of Le Mans.

Dixon competed in the 2023 24 Hours of Daytona as a co-driver in the No. 1 Cadillac V-LHDh car with Bourdais and Van Der Zande, finishing third overall. He, Bourdais and Van Der Zande went on to finish fourth in the 2023 24 Hours of Le Mans, and the trio were second overall at the season-ending Petit Le Mans. Dixon, Bourdais, Palou and Van Der Zande retired from the 2024 24 Hours of Daytona with a mechanical powertrain fault, and Dixon, Bourdais and Van Der Zande finished second overall in the 12 Hours of Sebring after a late race duel with WTR. Dixon, Bourdais and Van Der Zande teamed up again for the 2024 24 Hours of Le Mans, retiring after 18 hours with an unrepairable oil leak. The trio came from two laps down after two drive-through penalties to win the season-ending Petit Le Mans.

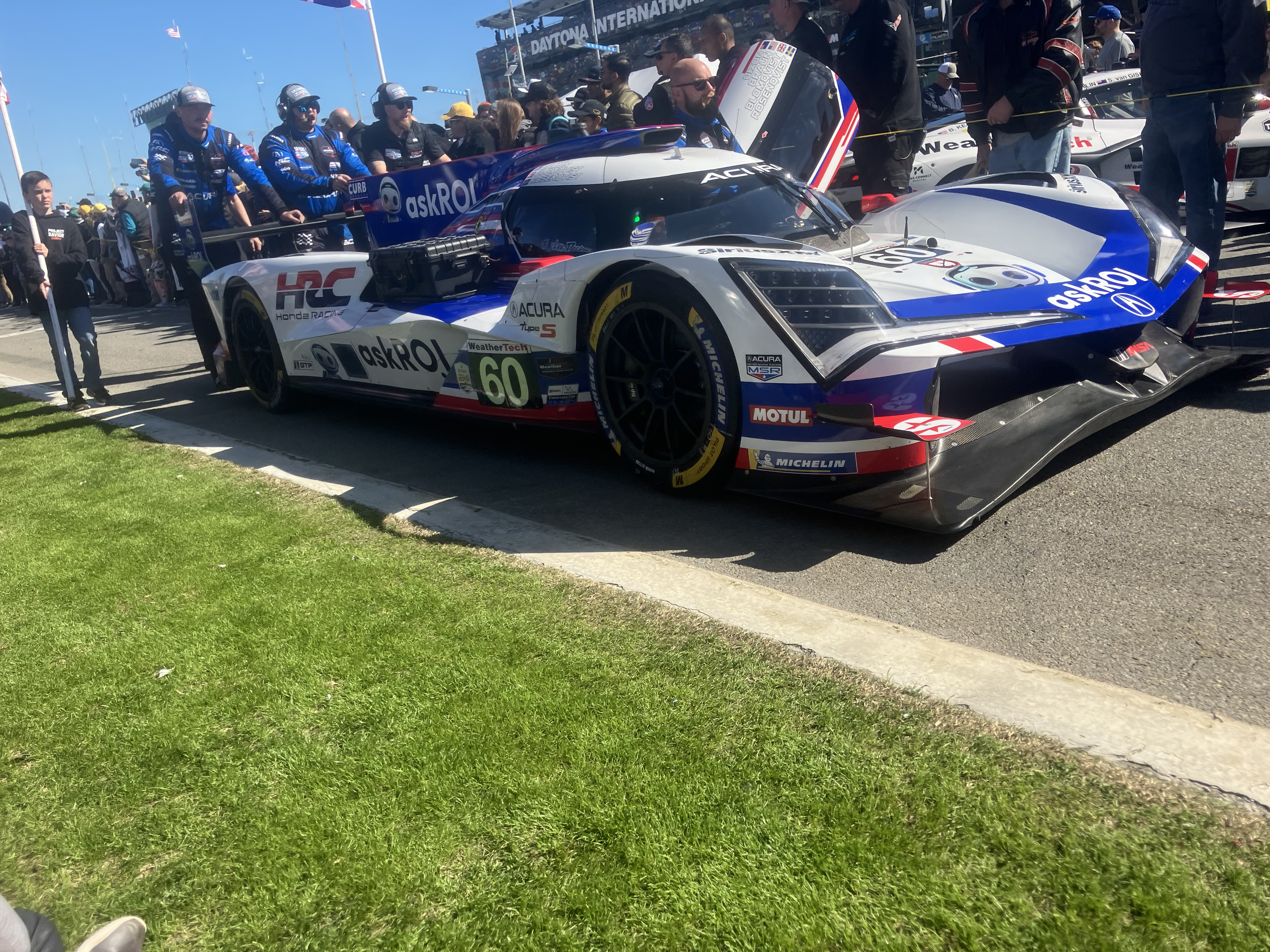
Dixon in the Meyer Shank Racing Acura ARX-06 before the start of the 2025 24 Hours of Daytona.

In 2025, Dixon shared the No. 60 Acura ARX-06 for the five Endurance Cup races of the 2025 IMSA SportsCar Championship alongside full-time IMSA drivers Colin Braun and Tom Blomqvist at Meyer Shank Racing, joined by Rosenqvist for the 24 Hours of Daytona. The team finished second at Daytona, tenth at Sebring and fifth at the Petit Le Mans.

== Other racing ventures ==
Dixon was one of twelve drivers invited to compete in the four-race IROC stock car racing series in 2004, driving an identically prepared Pontiac Firebird. He finished in the bottom half of the top ten in all four races and finished the season in tenth place in the points standings with 25 points. Dixon joined Kelly Racing as Todd Kelly's international co-driver in the No. 7 Holden VE Commodore for the 2010 V8 Supercar Championship Series' Armor All Gold Coast 600 double header event, (Note: His plan to race at both Philip Island and Bathurst did not come to fruition because of the lack of opportunities to test between IndyCar races. A second entry into the 2011 Armor All Gold Coast 600 as Shane van Gisbergen's co-driver at Stone Brothers Racing was cancelled because his wife gave birth to their second child prematurely.) finishing 20th in the first race and crashing in the second.

After his manager Johansson convinced the Williams F1 team to test him for a possible race seat in 2005, Dixon underwent a two-part assessment for the squad at the Circuit Paul Ricard in France and the Circuit de Catalunya in Spain in early 2004. The tests did not result in Dixon being signed to the Williams team in either a testing or a racing capacity because it was uninterested in employing a rookie.

== Driving style ==
Dixon generally performs better in a race than in a qualifying session. According to Palou, Dixon can maximise car performance consistency over a stint, a race or a season. Road & Track's Fred Smith writes that Dixon has a reputation of being patient, something Dixon says came from his formative years of racing cars when he could not afford to make an error otherwise he would have to stop competing because his family lacked money. The Race's Matt Beer and Jack Benyon write that Dixon is consistent not "in the boring sense of hanging back in third and fourth while others screw up" but rather "in the sense of always maximising what's possible amid the often crazy circumstances of IndyCar races" and that "Rival after rival has discovered how hard it is to shake Dixon off in a title fight, no matter what degree of plight he seems to be in during any given race."

According to Racer's Jeff Olson, Dixon prefers to drive a car with oversteer for better driveability, and racing journalist Marshall Pruett observes the driver's ability to perform 100 micro-corrections with the steering wheel during each lap. David Malsher-Lopez, writing for Motorsport.com characterised Dixon's handling style as not proactive but "reactive, a reflex match with the vagaries of car handling and physics." Since his early years competing in the IndyCar Series, he has been able to save more fuel than other drivers while driving faster because he requests information when each of his stints begins thorough preparation and car setups decided beforehand and operates within the limits of his given fuel mileage number by being as efficient as possible in a stint, allowing him to make fewer or faster pit stops. He attempts to ensure before the race that he is aware he will be provided with a car that drives well through a corner when in such a scenario.

== Non-racing ventures and recognition ==
Dixon is an ambassador for the youth cancer patients' support group CanTeen and Teen Cancer America because he feels teenagers with cancer as a group are overlooked. Dixon is also an ambassador for the Richard Mille watch maker, and supports CGR's Women in Motorsport initiative because he is the father of two daughters and believes women in an IndyCar team could improve performance. He has done business with the US division of the New Zealand appliance manufacturer Fisher & Paykel, and has fundraised for children's charities. He and his wife were honorary co-chairs of IndyHumane's annual Mutt Strut dog walk fundraiser at the Indianapolis Motor Speedway in April 2019.

Dixon has been a director of Concept Motorsport New Zealand since 2012. He appeared on the Late Show with David Letterman three times. Dixon was a guest on the 28 May 2008 edition of Live With Regis and Kelly, and was the subject of This Is Your Life on 21 September 2008. In July 2017, he appeared on Jay Leno's Garage, and his life and 2017 IndyCar season were the subject of the 2018 Bryn Evans documentary Born Racer.

Dixon was awarded the Jim Clark Trophy in 1999, 2001, 2004, and 2019 "for the New Zealand driver competing at a National or higher level who shows a sportsmanlike attitude to the sport and fellow competitors and natural ability in "putting up the most meritorious racing performance during the season" and the Bruce McLaren Trophy in 2003 and 2008. In the 2009 New Year Honours, he was made a Member of the New Zealand Order of Merit, upgraded Companion of the New Zealand Order of Merit in the 2019 Queen's Birthday Honours, and appointed Knight Companion of the New Zealand Order of Merit in the 2026 New Year Honours, all for services to motorsport". Dixon was named New Zealand's Sportsman of the Year in 2008 and 2013 and was nominated in 2003, 2009, 2015, 2018 and 2021.

NZ Post issued the New Zealand Champions of World Motorsport stamp series featuring Dixon and four other New Zealand motor racing champions in early 2009. Dixon was inducted into the MotorSport New Zealand Wall of Fame in 2009 and the Road to Indy Hall of Fame in 2014. In July 2013, he was named by Autosport magazine as one of the 50 greatest drivers to have never raced in F1. Joe Hogsett, the Mayor of Indianapolis, recognised Dixon's motor racing achievements by declaring 24 September 2018 "Scott Dixon Day" in Indianapolis. He was inducted into the Open Wheel category of the Motorsports Hall of Fame of America in March 2024, and the Long Beach Motorsports Walk of Fame in 2025.

== Racing record ==
=== Career summary ===
Season	Series	Team	Races	Wins	Poles	F/Laps	Podiums	Points	Position
1993–94	New Zealand Formula Vee Championship	N/A	20	14	2	2	17	524	**1st**
1996–97	New Zealand Formula Ford Championship	N/A	?	?	?	?	?	?	**1st**
1997	Australian Drivers' Championship	Ralt Australia	14	0	?	?	1	125	**3rd**
1998	Australian Drivers' Championship	SH Racing	10	5	?	?	9	160	**1st**
1998	New Zealand Grand Prix	SH Racing	1	0	?	?	1	N/A	**2nd**
1999	Indy Lights	Johansson Motorsport	12	1	1	0	4	88	5th
1999	Formula Holden New Zealand	?	?	?	?	?	?	62	**2nd**
1999	New Zealand Grand Prix	SH Racing	1	0	?	?	1	N/A	**2nd**
1999	American Le Mans Series – Prototype	Jim Matthews Racing	1	0	0	0	0	0	NC
2000	Indy Lights	PacWest Lights	12	6	1	5	7	155	**1st**
2001	CART	PacWest Racing	20	1	0	0	2	98	8th
2002	CART	PWR Championship Racing	3	0	0	0	0	97	13th
2002	CART	Chip Ganassi Racing	16	0	0	0	1	97	13th
2003	IndyCar Series	Chip Ganassi Racing	16	3	3	5	8	507	**1st**
2004	IndyCar Series	Chip Ganassi Racing	15	0	0	0	1	355	10th
2004	Rolex Sports Car Series – DP	CompUSA Chip Ganassi Racing with Felix Sabates	2	0	0	0	1	39	55th
2004	International Race of Champions	N/A	4	0	0	?	0	26	10th
2004	Formula One	BMW Williams F1 Team	Test driver						
2005	IndyCar Series	Chip Ganassi Racing	17	1	0	1	1	321	13th
2005	Rolex Sports Car Series – DP	Target Chip Ganassi Racing with Felix Sabates	1	0	0	0	0	25	66th
2006	IndyCar Series	Chip Ganassi Racing	14	2	1	3	6	460	4th
2006	Rolex Sports Car Series – DP	Target Chip Ganassi Racing with Felix Sabates	2	1	0	0	1	63	58th
2007	IndyCar Series	Chip Ganassi Racing	17	4	2	1	10	624	**2nd**
2007	Rolex Sports Car Series – DP	Target Chip Ganassi Racing with Felix Sabates	1	0	0	0	0	10	75th
2008	IndyCar Series	Chip Ganassi Racing	17	6	7	2	7	646	**1st**
2008	Rolex Sports Car Series – DP	Target Chip Ganassi Racing with Felix Sabates	1	0	0	0	0	13	60th
2008	American Le Mans Series – LMP2	de Ferran Motorsports	1	0	0	0	0	18	28th
2009	IndyCar Series	Chip Ganassi Racing	17	5	1	5	10	605	**2nd**
2009	Rolex Sports Car Series – DP	Target Chip Ganassi Racing with Felix Sabates	1	0	0	0	1	26	40th
2009	American Le Mans Series – LMP1	de Ferran Motorsports	2	0	1	0	0	12	18th
2010	IndyCar Series	Chip Ganassi Racing	17	3	0	2	5	547	**3rd**
2010	Rolex Sports Car Series – DP	Target Chip Ganassi Racing with Felix Sabates	1	0	0	0	0	16	65th
2010	V8 Supercar Championship	Kelly Racing	2	0	0	0	0	0	NC
2011	IndyCar Series	Chip Ganassi Racing	17	2	2	4	9	518	**3rd**
2011	Rolex Sports Car Series – DP	Target Chip Ganassi Racing with Felix Sabates	1	0	0	0	1	32	24th
2012	IndyCar Series	Chip Ganassi Racing	15	2	1	0	6	435	**3rd**
2012	Rolex Sports Car Series – DP	Target Chip Ganassi Racing with Felix Sabates	2	0	0	0	0	56	21st
2013	IndyCar Series	Chip Ganassi Racing	19	4	2	0	6	577	**1st**
2013	Rolex Sports Car Series – DP	Target Chip Ganassi Racing with Felix Sabates	2	1	0	1	2	50	27th
2014	IndyCar Series	Chip Ganassi Racing	18	2	1	3	4	604	**3rd**
2014	United SportsCar Championship – P	Chip Ganassi Racing	3	0	0	0	1	81	26th
2015	IndyCar Series	Chip Ganassi Racing	16	3	2	2	4	556	**1st**
2015	United SportsCar Championship – P	Chip Ganassi Racing	3	1	0	0	2	98	13th
2016	IndyCar Series	Chip Ganassi Racing	16	2	2	3	4	477	6th
2016	IMSA SportsCar Championship – P	Ford Chip Ganassi Racing	1	0	0	0	0	25	7th
2016	IMSA SportsCar Championship – GTLM	Ford Chip Ganassi Racing	2	0	0	0	0	52	21st
2016	24 Hours of Le Mans – GTE Pro	Ford Chip Ganassi Team USA	1	0	0	0	0	N/A	**3rd**
2017	IndyCar Series	Chip Ganassi Racing	17	1	1	1	7	621	**3rd**
2017	IMSA SportsCar Championship – GTLM	Ford Chip Ganassi Racing	3	0	0	0	0	73	15th
2017	24 Hours of Le Mans – GTE Pro	Ford Chip Ganassi Team USA	1	0	0	0	0	N/A	7th
2018	IndyCar Series	Chip Ganassi Racing	17	3	1	3	9	678	**1st**
2018	IMSA SportsCar Championship – GTLM	Ford Chip Ganassi Racing	3	1	0	0	1	89	11th
2018	24 Hours of Le Mans – GTE Pro	Ford Chip Ganassi Team USA	1	0	0	0	0	N/A	14th
2019	IndyCar Series	Chip Ganassi Racing	17	2	0	2	10	578	4th
2019	IMSA SportsCar Championship – GTLM	Ford Chip Ganassi Racing	3	0	0	0	1	85	17th
2019	24 Hours of Le Mans – GTE Pro	Ford Chip Ganassi Team USA	1	0	0	0	0	N/A	5th
2020	IndyCar Series	Chip Ganassi Racing	14	4	0	2	7	537	**1st**
2020	IMSA SportsCar Championship – DPi	Konica Minolta Cadillac	3	2	0	1	2	94	16th
2020	Intercontinental GT Challenge	R-Motorsport	1	0	0	0	0	1	21st
2021	IndyCar Series	Chip Ganassi Racing	16	1	1	0	5	481	4th
2021	IMSA SportsCar Championship – DPi	Cadillac Chip Ganassi Racing	3	0	0	1	0	858	15th
2022	IndyCar Series	Chip Ganassi Racing	17	2	1	0	4	521	**3rd**
2022	IMSA SportsCar Championship – DPi	Cadillac Racing	2	0	0	1	0	527	15th
2023	IndyCar Series	Chip Ganassi Racing	17	3	0	0	6	578	**2nd**
2023	IMSA SportsCar Championship – DPi	Cadillac Racing	3	0	0	1	2	952	12th
2023	24 Hours of Le Mans – Hypercar	Cadillac Racing	1	0	0	0	0	N/A	4th
2024	IndyCar Series	Chip Ganassi Racing	17	2	0	3	5	456	6th
2024	IMSA SportsCar Championship – GTP	Cadillac Racing	3	1	0	0	2	972	17th
2024	24 Hours of Le Mans – Hypercar	Cadillac Racing	1	0	0	0	0	N/A	DNF
2025	IndyCar Series	Chip Ganassi Racing	17	1	0	0	3	452	**3rd**
2025	IMSA SportsCar Championship – GTP	Acura Meyer Shank Racing w/Curb-Agajanian	3	0	1	0	1	882	19th
2026	IndyCar Series	Chip Ganassi Racing	18	0	0	1	1	331	12th
2026	IMSA SportsCar Championship – GTP	Acura Meyer Shank Racing w/Curb-Agajanian	3	0	1	0	0	845	20th
2027	IndyCar Series	Arrow McLaren							TBD

=== American open–wheel racing results ===
(key) (Races in bold indicate pole position; races in italics indicate fastest lap.)

==== Indy Lights ====
Year	Team	1	2	3	4	5	6	7	8	9	10	11	12	Rank	Pts
1999	Johansson Motorsports	MIA; 3	LBH; 2	NAZ; 4	MIL; 15	POR; 11	CLE; 14	TOR; 18	MIS; 16	DET; 7	**CHI**; 1	LAG; 2	FON; 16	5th	88
2000	PacWest Lights	LBH; 1	**MIL**; 1	DET; 4	POR; 11	MIS; 14	CHI; 1	MOH; 2	VAN; 1	LAG; 1	STL; 15	HOU; 15	FON; 1	1st	155

==== CART ====
Year	Team	No.	Chassis	Engine	1	2	3	4	5	6	7	8	9	10	11	12	13	14	15	16	17	18	19	20	21	Rank	Pts	Ref
2001	PacWest Racing	18	Reynard 01I	Toyota RV8F 2.65 V8	MTY; 13	LBH; 19	TXS; C	NAZ; 1	MOT; 9	MIL; 3	DET; 22	POR; 7	CLE; 20	TOR; 5	MCH; 10	CHI; 4	MOH; 12	ROA; 4	VAN; 13	LAU; 9	ROC; 22	HOU; 18	LAG; 4	SRF; 15	FON; 17	8th	98	
2002	PWR Championship Racing	7	Lola B02/00	Toyota RV8F 2.65 V8	MTY; 6	LBH; 18	MOT; 9																			13th	97	
2002	Chip Ganassi Racing	44	Lola B02/00	Toyota RV8F 2.65 V8				MIL; 6	LAG; 6	POR; 7	CHI; 6	TOR; 5	CLE; 15	VAN; 16	MOH; 5	ROA; 17	MTL; 10	DEN; 2	ROC; 12	MIA; 18	SRF; 15	FON; 6	MXC; 7			13th	97	

==== IndyCar Series ====
Year	Team	No.	Chassis	Engine	1	2	3	4	5	6	7	8	9	10	11	12	13	14	15	16	17	18	19	Rank	Pts	Ref
2003	Target Chip Ganassi Racing	9	G-Force GF09	Toyota	HMS; 1	PHX; 20	**MOT**; 15	INDY; 17	TXS; 6	PIK; 1	**RIR**; 1	**KAN**; 6	**NSH**; 2	MCH; 5	GTW; 15	KTY; 2	**NAZ**; 16	CHI; 2	FON; 2	TXS; 2				1st	507	
2004	Target Chip Ganassi Racing	1	G-Force GF09B	Toyota	HMS; 18	PHX; 2	MOT; 5	INDY; 8	TXS; 14	RIR; 8	KAN; 12	NSH; 8	MIL; DNS	MCH; 7	KTY; 13	PIK; 20	NAZ; 9	CHI; 7	FON; 8	TXS; 6				10th	355	
2005	Target Chip Ganassi Racing	9	Panoz GF09C	Toyota	HMS; 16	PHX; 12	STP; 6		INDY; 24	TXS; 11	RIR; 22	KAN; 18	NSH; 6	MIL; 13	MCH; 19	KTY; 23	PIK; 16	SNM; 7	CHI; 19	WGL; 1	FON; 10			13th	321	
2005	Target Chip Ganassi Racing	9	Dallara IR-05	Toyota				MOT; 21																13th	321	
2006	Target Chip Ganassi Racing	9	Dallara IR-05	Honda	HMS; 5		MOT; 2	INDY; 6		TXS; 2	RIR; 11	KAN; 4	NSH; 1	MIL; 10	MCH; 16	KTY; 2		CHI; 2						4th	460	
2006	Target Chip Ganassi Racing	9	Panoz GF09C	Honda		STP; 2			WGL; 1								**SNM**; 4							4th	460	
2007	Target Chip Ganassi Racing	9	Dallara IR-05	Honda	HMS; 2	STP; 2	MOT; 4	KAN; 4	INDY; 2	MIL; 4	TXS; 12	**IOW**; 10	RIR; 2	WGL; 1	**NSH**; 1	MOH; 1	MCH; 10	KTY; 2	SNM; 1	DET; 8	CHI; 2			2nd	624	
2008	Target Chip Ganassi Racing	9	Dallara IR-05	Honda	**HMS**; 1	STP; 22	MOT^{1} 3	LBH^{1} DNP	**KAN**; 3	**INDY**; 1	MIL; 2	**TXS**; 1	**IOW**; 4	RIR; 3	WGL; 11	NSH; 1	MOH; 3	EDM; 1	**KTY**; 1	SNM; 12	**DET**; 5	CHI; 2		1st	646	
2009	Target Chip Ganassi Racing	9	Dallara IR-05	Honda	STP; 16	LBH; 15	KAN; 1	INDY; 6	MIL; 1	TXS; 3	IOW; 5	RIR; 1	WGL; 3	TOR; 4	EDM; 3	**KTY**; 7	MOH; 1	SNM; 13	CHI; 2	**MOT**; 1	HMS; 3			2nd	605	
2010	Target Chip Ganassi Racing	9	Dallara IR-05	Honda	SAO; 6	STP; 18	ALA; 2	LBH; 4	KAN; 1	INDY; 5	TXS; 4	IOW; 6	WGL; 8	TOR; 20	EDM; 1	MOH; 5	SNM; 2	CHI; 8	KTY; 7	MOT; 6	HMS; 1			3rd	547	
2011	Target Chip Ganassi Racing	9	Dallara IR-05	Honda	STP; 16	ALA; 2	LBH; 18	SAO; 12	INDY; 5	TXS; 2	TXS; 2	MIL; 7	IOW; 3	TOR; 2	EDM; 23	**MOH**; 1	NHM; 3	SNM; 5	BAL; 5	**MOT**; 1	KTY; 3	LVS^{2} C		3rd	518	
2012	Target Chip Ganassi Racing	9	Dallara DW12	Honda	STP; 2	ALA; 2	LBH; 23	SAO; 17	INDY; 2	**DET**; 1	TXS; 18	MIL; 11	IOW; 4	TOR; 25	EDM; 10	MOH; 1	SNM; 13	BAL; 4	FON; 3					3rd	435	
2013	Target Chip Ganassi Racing	9	Dallara DW12	Honda	STP; 5	ALA; 2	LBH; 11	SAO; 18	INDY; 14	DET; 4	DET; 4	TXS; 23	MIL; 6	IOW; 16	POC; 1	TOR; 1	**TOR**; 1	MOH; 7	SNM; 15	**BAL**; 19	HOU; 1	HOU; 2	FON; 5	1st	577	
2014	Target Chip Ganassi Racing	9	Dallara DW12	Chevrolet	STP; 4	LBH; 12	ALA; 3	IMS; 15	INDY; 29	DET; 11	DET; 4	TXS; 5	HOU; 19	HOU; 18	POC; 5	**IOW**; 4	TOR; 5	TOR; 7	MOH; 1	MIL; 4	SNM; 1	FON; 2		3rd	604	
2015	Target Chip Ganassi Racing	9	Dallara DW12	Chevrolet	STP; 15	NLA; 11	LBH; 1	ALA; 3	IMS; 10	**INDY**; 4	DET; 5	DET; 20	TXS; 1	TOR; 8	FON; 6	MIL; 7	IOW; 18	**MOH**; 4	POC; 9	SNM; 1				1st^{3}	556	
2016	Target Chip Ganassi Racing	9	Dallara DW12	Chevrolet	STP; 7	PHX; 1	LBH; 2	ALA; 10	IMS; 7	INDY; 8	DET; 19	DET; 5	ROA; 22	IOW; 3	**TOR**; 8	MOH; 22	POC; 6	TXS; 19	**WGL**; 1	SNM; 17				6th	477	
2017	Chip Ganassi Racing	9	Dallara DW12	Honda	STP; 3	LBH; 4	ALA; 2	PHX; 5	IMS; 2	**INDY**; 32	DET; 2	DET; 6	TXS; 9	ROA; 1	IOW; 8	TOR; 10	MOH; 9	POC; 6	GTW; 2	WGL; 2	SNM; 4			3rd	621	
2018	PNC Bank Chip Ganassi Racing	9	Dallara DW12	Honda	STP; 6	PHX; 4	LBH; 11	ALA; 6	IMS; 2	INDY; 3	DET; 1	DET; 4	TXS; 1	ROA; 3	IOW; 12	TOR; 1	MOH; 5	POC; 3	**GTW**; 3	POR; 5	SNM; 2			1st	678	
2019	PNC Bank Chip Ganassi Racing	9	Dallara DW12	Honda	STP; 2	COA; 13	ALA; 2	LBH; 3	IMS; 2	INDY; 17	DET; 22	DET; 1	TXS; 17	ROA; 5	TOR; 2	IOW; 2	MOH; 1	POC; 2	GTW; 20	POR; 16	LAG; 3			4th	578	
2020	PNC Bank Chip Ganassi Racing	9	Dallara DW12	Honda	TXS; 1	IMS; 1	ROA; 1	ROA; 12	IOW; 2	IOW; 5	INDY; 2	GTW; 1	GTW; 5	MOH; 10	MOH; 10	IMS; 9	IMS; 8	STP; 3						1st	537	
2021	PNC Bank Chip Ganassi Racing	9	Dallara DW12	Honda	ALA; 3	STP; 5	TXS; 1	**TXS**; 4	IMS; 9	**INDY**; 17	DET; 8	DET; 7	ROA; 4	MOH; 4	NSH; 2	IMS; 17	GTW; 19	POR; 3	LAG; 13	LBH; 3				4th	481	
2022	PNC Bank Chip Ganassi Racing	9	Dallara DW12	Honda	STP; 8	TXS; 5	LBH; 6	ALA; 5	IMS; 10	**INDY**; 21	DET; 3	ROA; 9	MOH; 5	TOR; 1	IOW; 5	IOW; 4	IMS; 8	NSH; 1	GTW; 8	POR; 3	LAG; 12			3rd	521	
2023	PNC Bank Chip Ganassi Racing	9	Dallara DW12	Honda	STP; 3	TXS; 5	LBH; 27	ALA; 7	IMS; 6	INDY; 6	DET; 4	ROA; 4	MOH; 2	TOR; 4	IOW; 6	IOW; 6	NSH; 5	IMS; 1	GTW; 1	POR; 3	LAG; 1			2nd	578	
2024	PNC Bank Chip Ganassi Racing	9	Dallara DW12	Honda	STP; 7	THE; DNQ	LBH; 1	ALA; 15	IMS; 4	INDY; 3	DET; 1	ROA; 21	LAG; 6	MOH; 27	IOW; 4	IOW; 4	TOR; 3	GTW; 11	POR; 28	MIL; 10	MIL; 2	NSH; 17		6th	456	
2025	PNC Bank Chip Ganassi Racing	9	Dallara DW12	Honda	STP; 2	THE; 10	LBH; 8	ALA; 12	IMS; 5	INDY; 20	DET; 11	GTW; 4	ROA; 9	MOH; 1	IOW; 10	IOW; 2	TOR; 10	LAG; 5	POR; 11	MIL; 9	NSH; 12			3rd	452	
2026	PNC Bank Chip Ganassi Racing	9	Dallara DW12	Honda	STP; 23	PHX; 7	ARL; 8	ALA; 7	LBH; 3	IMS; 6	INDY; 15	DET; 24	GTW; 12	ROA; 11	MOH; 17	NSH; 18	POR; 14	MRK; 18	WSH; 7	MIL; 18	MIL; 15	LAG; 17		12th	331	

* Season still in progress.

- ^{1} Races run on same day
- ^{2} The 2011 IZOD IndyCar World Championship was abandoned after Dan Wheldon died from injuries sustained in a 15-car crash on lap 11.
- ^{3} Dixon won the title on the tiebreak—he won three races to Juan Pablo Montoya's two after both tied on 556 points.

==== Indianapolis 500 ====
Year	Chassis	Engine	Start	Finish	Team
2003	G-Force	Toyota	4	17	Chip Ganassi Racing
2004	G-Force	Toyota	13	8	Chip Ganassi Racing
2005	Panoz	Toyota	13	24	Chip Ganassi Racing
2006	Dallara	Honda	4	6	Chip Ganassi Racing
2007	Dallara	Honda	4	2	Chip Ganassi Racing
2008	Dallara	Honda	**1**	**1**	Chip Ganassi Racing
2009	Dallara	Honda	5	6	Chip Ganassi Racing
2010	Dallara	Honda	6	5	Chip Ganassi Racing
2011	Dallara	Honda	2	5	Chip Ganassi Racing
2012	Dallara	Honda	15	2	Chip Ganassi Racing
2013	Dallara	Honda	16	14	Chip Ganassi Racing
2014	Dallara	Chevrolet	11	29	Chip Ganassi Racing
2015	Dallara	Chevrolet	**1**	4	Chip Ganassi Racing
2016	Dallara	Chevrolet	13	8	Chip Ganassi Racing
2017	Dallara	Honda	**1**	32	Chip Ganassi Racing
2018	Dallara	Honda	9	3	Chip Ganassi Racing
2019	Dallara	Honda	18	17	Chip Ganassi Racing
2020	Dallara	Honda	2	2	Chip Ganassi Racing
2021	Dallara	Honda	**1**	17	Chip Ganassi Racing
2022	Dallara	Honda	**1**	21	Chip Ganassi Racing
2023	Dallara	Honda	6	6	Chip Ganassi Racing
2024	Dallara	Honda	21	3	Chip Ganassi Racing
2025	Dallara	Honda	4	20	Chip Ganassi Racing
2026	Dallara	Honda	10	15	Chip Ganassi Racing

=== Sports car racing ===
==== Complete American Le Mans Series results ====
Year	Entrant	Class	Chassis	Engine	1	2	3	4	5	6	7	8	9	10	11	Pos.	Pts	Ref
1999	Doran Matthews Racing	LMP	Ferrari 333 SP	Ferrari F310E 4.0 V12	SEB	RAL	MOS	SON	POR	PET; 15	LAG	LVS				NC	0	
2008	de Ferran Motorsports	LMP2	Acura ARX-01b	Acura 3.4 V8	SEB	STP	LBH	MMP	LIM	MOH	ROA	MOS	DET	PET; 5	LAG	28th	18	
2009	de Ferran Motorsports	LMP1	Acura ARX-02a	Acura 4.0 V8	**SEB**; 6	STP	LBH	MMP	LIM	MOH	ROA	MOS	PET; 9	LAG		28th	12	

==== Rolex Sports Car Series results ====
(key) (Races in bold indicate pole position) (Races in italics indicate fastest lap) (Results indicate class finishing position)

Year	Entrant	Class	Car	Engine	1	2	3	4	5	6	7	8	9	10	11	12	13	14	15	Pos.	Pts	Ref
2004	CGR Grand Am	DP	Riley Mk XI	Lexus 4.3 V8	**DAY**; 6	HOM	PHX	MTT	WGL	DAY	MOH	WGL	HOM	VIR	BAR					45th	55	
2004	CompUSA Chip Ganassi with Felix Sabates	DP	Riley Mk XI	Lexus 4.3 V8												CAL; 3				45th	55	
2005	Target Chip Ganassi with Felix Sabates	DP	Riley Mk XI	Lexus 4.3 V8	DAY; 6	HOM	CAL	LAG	MTT	WGL	BAR	WGL	DAY	MOH	PHX	WGL	VIR	MEX		77th	25	
2006	Target Chip Ganassi with Felix Sabates	DP	Riley Mk XI	Lexus 5.0 V8	DAY; 1	MEX	HOM	LBH	VIR	LAG	PHX	LIM	WGL	DAY	BAR	WGL	SON	**MMP**; 4		63rd	63	
2007	Target Chip Ganassi with Felix Sabates	DP	Riley Mk XI	Lexus 5.0 V8	DAY; 21	MEX	HOM	VIR	LAG	WGL	MOH	DAY	IOW	BAR	CGV	WGL	SON	MMP		115th	10	
2008	Target Chip Ganassi with Felix Sabates	DP	Riley Mk XI	Lexus 5.0 V8	DAY; 18	HOM	MEX	VIR	LAG	LIM	WGL	MOH	DAY	BAR	CGV	WGL	SON	NJE	MMP	85th	13	
2009	Target Chip Ganassi with Felix Sabates	DP	Riley Mk XI	Lexus 5.0 V8	DAY; 5	VIR	NJE	LAG	WGL	MOH	DAY	BAR	WGL	CGV	MMP	HOM				50th	26	
2010	Target Chip Ganassi with Felix Sabates	DP	Riley Mk XX	BMW 5.0 V8	DAY; 15	HOM	BAR	VIR	LIM	WGL	MOH	DAY	NJE	WGL	CGV	MMP				65th	16	
2011	Target Chip Ganassi with Felix Sabates	DP	Riley Mk XX	BMW 5.0 V8	DAY; 2	HOM	BAR	VIR	LIM	LAG	WGL	MOH	DAY	NJE	WGL	CGV	MMP			32nd	32	
2012	Target Chip Ganassi with Felix Sabates	DP	Riley Mk XXVI	BMW 5.0 V8	DAY; 4	BAR	HOM	NJE	DET	MOH	ROA	WGL	IMS; 4	WGL	CGV	LAG	LIM			26th	56	
2013	Target Chip Ganassi with Felix Sabates	DP	Riley Mk XXVI	BMW 5.0 V8	DAY; 11	COA	BAR	RAL	DET	MOH	WGL	IMS	ROA	KAN	LAG; 3	LIM				35th	50	

==== Complete IMSA SportsCar Championship results ====
(key) (Races in bold indicate pole position) (Races in italics indicate fastest lap) (Results indicate class finishing position)

Year	Team	No.	Class	Make	Engine	1	2	3	4	5	6	7	8	9	10	11	12	Pos.	Points	Ref
2014	Chip Ganassi Racing	02	P	Ford EcoBoost Riley DP	Ford EcoBoost 3.5 L V6 Turbo	DAY; 8	SEB; 6	LBH	LGA	DET	WGL	MOS	IMS	ELK	COA			26th	81	
2014	Chip Ganassi Racing	01	P	Ford EcoBoost Riley DP	Ford EcoBoost 3.5 L V6 Turbo											PET; 3		26th	81	
2015	Chip Ganassi Racing	02	P	Ford EcoBoost Riley DP	Ford EcoBoost 3.5 L V6 Turbo	DAY; 1												13th	98	
2015	Chip Ganassi Racing	01	P	Ford EcoBoost Riley DP	Ford EcoBoost 3.5 L V6 Turbo		SEB; 4	LBH	LGA	DET	WGL	MOS	ELK	COA	PET; 2			13th	98	
2016	Ford Chip Ganassi Racing	02	P	Ford EcoBoost Riley DP	Ford EcoBoost 3.5 L V6 Turbo	DAY; 7												7th	25	
2016	Ford Chip Ganassi Racing	67	GTLM	Ford GT	Ford 3.5 L EcoBoost V6		SEB; 5	LBH	LGA	DET	WGL	MOS	LIM	ELK	VIR	COA	PET; 7	21st	52	
2017	Ford Chip Ganassi Racing	67	GTLM	Ford GT	Ford EcoBoost 3.5 L Turbo V6	DAY; 10	SEB; 4	LBH	COA	WGL	MOS	LIM	ELK	VIR	LGA	PET; 8		15th	73	
2018	Ford Chip Ganassi Racing	67	GTLM	Ford GT	Ford EcoBoost 3.5 L Turbo V6	DAY; 1	SEB; 4	LBH	MOH	WGL	MOS	LIM	ELK	VIR	LGA	PET; 5		11th	89	
2019	Ford Chip Ganassi Racing	67	GTLM	Ford GT	Ford EcoBoost 3.5 L Turbo V6	DAY; 4	SEB; 6	LBH	MOH	WGL	MOS	LIM	ELK	VIR	LGA	PET; 2		17th	85	
2020	Konica Minolta Cadillac	10	DPi	Cadillac DPi-V.R	Cadillac 5.5 L V8	DAY; 1	DAY	SEB	ELK	ATL	MOH	PET; 1	LGA	SEB; 7				16th	94	
2021	Cadillac Chip Ganassi Racing	01	DPi	Cadillac DPi-V.R	Cadillac 5.5 L V8	DAY; 5	SEB; 5	MOH	DET	WGL	WGL	ELK	LGA	LBH	PET; 5			15th	858	
2022	Cadillac Racing	01	DPi	Cadillac DPi-V.R	Cadillac 5.5 L V8	DAY; 7	SEB	LBH	LGA	MOH	DET	WGL	MOS	ELK	PET; 4			15th	572	
2023	Cadillac Racing	01	GTP	Cadillac V-LMDh	Cadillac LMC55R 5. 5 L V8	DAY; 3	SEB; 7	LBH	LGA	WGL	MOS	ELK	IMS	PET; 2				12th	952	
2024	Cadillac Racing	01	GTP	Cadillac V-Series.R	Cadillac LMC55R 5. 5 L V8	DAY; 10	SEB; 2	LBH	LGA	DET	WGL	ELK	IMS	PET; 1				17th	972	
2025	Acura Meyer Shank Racing w/Curb-Agajanian	60	GTP	Acura ARX-06	Acura AR24e 2.4 L turbo V6	DAY; 2	SEB; 10	LBH	LGA	DET	WGL	ELK	IMS	**PET**; 5				19th	882	
2026	Acura Meyer Shank Racing w/Curb-Agajanian		GTP	Acura ARX-06	Acura AR24e 2.4 L Turbo V6	DAY; 9	SEB; 4	LBH	LGA	DET	WGL	ELK	IMS	**PET**; 6				20th	845	

==== 24 Hours of Daytona results ====
Year	Team	Co-drivers	Car	Class	Laps	Pos.	Class pos.
2004	(United States) CGR Grand Am	(United States) Scott Pruett (Italy) Max Papis (Mexico) Jimmy Morales	Riley Mk XI-Lexus	DP	502	10th	6th
2005	(United States) Target Chip Ganassi with Felix Sabates	(United States) Casey Mears (United Kingdom) Darren Manning	Riley Mk. XI-Lexus	DP	694	6th	6th
2006	(United States) Target Chip Ganassi with Felix Sabates	(United Kingdom) Dan Wheldon (United States) Casey Mears	Riley Mk. XI-Lexus	DP	734	**1st**	**1st**
2007	(United States) Target Chip Ganassi with Felix Sabates	(United Kingdom) Dan Wheldon (Mexico) Memo Rojas	Riley Mk. XI-Lexus	DP	538	DNF	DNF
2008	(United States) Chip Ganassi with Felix Sabates	(United Kingdom) Dan Wheldon (Mexico) Salvador Durán (United Kingdom) Alex Lloyd	Riley Mk. XI-Lexus	DP	515	DNF	DNF
2009	(United States) Chip Ganassi Racing with Felix Sabates	(United Kingdom) Dario Franchitti (United Kingdom) Alex Lloyd	Riley Mk. XI-Lexus	DP	731	5th	5th
2010	(United States) Chip Ganassi Racing with Felix Sabates	(Colombia) Juan Pablo Montoya (United Kingdom) Dario Franchitti (United States) Jamie McMurray	Riley Mk. XX-BMW	DP	249	DNF	DNF
2011	(United States) Chip Ganassi Racing with Felix Sabates	(Colombia) Juan Pablo Montoya (United Kingdom) Dario Franchitti (United States) Jamie McMurray	Riley Mk. XX-BMW	DP	721	**2nd**	**2nd**
2012	(United States) Chip Ganassi Racing with Felix Sabates	(Colombia) Juan Pablo Montoya (United Kingdom) Dario Franchitti (United States) Jamie McMurray	Riley Mk. XXVI-BMW	DP	760	4th	4th
2013	(United States) Chip Ganassi Racing with Felix Sabates	(United Kingdom) Dario Franchitti (United States) Jamie McMurray (United States) Joey Hand	Riley Mk. XXVI-BMW	DP	594	DNF	DNF
2014	(United States) Chip Ganassi Racing with Felix Sabates	(Brazil) Tony Kanaan (United States) Kyle Larson (United Kingdom) Marino Franchitti	Riley Mk. XXVI-Ford	P	667	DNF	DNF
2015	(United States) Chip Ganassi Racing with Felix Sabates	(Brazil) Tony Kanaan (United States) Kyle Larson (United States) Jamie McMurray	Riley Mk. XXVI-Ford	P	740	**1st**	**1st**
2016	(United States) Ford Chip Ganassi Racing	(Brazil) Tony Kanaan (United States) Kyle Larson (United States) Jamie McMurray	Riley Mk. XXVI-Ford	P	708	13th	7th
2017	(United States) Ford Chip Ganassi Racing	(Australia) Ryan Briscoe (United Kingdom) Richard Westbrook	Ford GT	GTLM	624	27th	10th
2018	(United States) Ford Chip Ganassi Racing	(Australia) Ryan Briscoe (United Kingdom) Richard Westbrook	Ford GT	GTLM	783	11th	**1st**
2019	(United States) Ford Chip Ganassi Racing	(Australia) Ryan Briscoe (United Kingdom) Richard Westbrook	Ford GT	GTLM	570	13th	4th
2020	(United States) Konica Minolta Cadillac	(Australia) Ryan Briscoe (Japan) Kamui Kobayashi (Netherlands) Renger van der Zande	Cadillac DPi-V.R	DPi	833	**1st**	**1st**
2021	(United States) Cadillac Chip Ganassi Racing	(Denmark) Kevin Magnussen (Netherlands) Renger van der Zande	Cadillac DPi-V.R	DPi	807	5th	5th
2022	(United States) Cadillac Racing	(France) Sébastien Bourdais (Spain) Álex Palou (Netherlands) Renger van der Zande	Cadillac DPi-V.R	DPi	722	14th	7th
2023	(United States) Cadillac Racing	(France) Sébastien Bourdais (Netherlands) Renger van der Zande	Cadillac V-LMDh	GTP	783	**3rd**	**3rd**
2024	(United States) Cadillac Racing	(France) Sébastien Bourdais (Spain) Álex Palou (Netherlands) Renger van der Zande	Cadillac V-LMDh	GTP	423	DNF	DNF
2025	(United States) Acura Meyer Shank Racing w/Curb-Agajanian	(United Kingdom) Tom Blomqvist (United States) Colin Braun (Sweden) Felix Rosenqvist	Acura ARX-06	GTP	781	**2nd**	**2nd**

==== 24 Hours of Le Mans results ====
Year	Team	Co-drivers	Car	Class	Laps	Pos.	Class pos.
2016	(United States) Ford Chip Ganassi Team USA	(Australia) Ryan Briscoe (United Kingdom) Richard Westbrook	Ford GT	GTE; Pro	340	20th	**3rd**
2017	(United States) Ford Chip Ganassi Team USA	(Australia) Ryan Briscoe (United Kingdom) Richard Westbrook	Ford GT	GTE; Pro	337	23rd	7th
2018	(United States) Ford Chip Ganassi Team USA	(Australia) Ryan Briscoe (United Kingdom) Richard Westbrook	Ford GT	GTE; Pro	309	39th	14th
2019	(United States) Ford Chip Ganassi Team USA	(Australia) Ryan Briscoe (United Kingdom) Richard Westbrook	Ford GT	GTE; Pro	341	24th	5th
2023	(United States) Cadillac Racing	(France) Sébastien Bourdais (Netherlands) Renger van der Zande	Cadillac V-Series.R	Hypercar	340	4th	4th
2024	(United States) Cadillac Racing	(France) Sébastien Bourdais (Netherlands) Renger van der Zande	Cadillac V-Series.R	Hypercar	223	DNF	DNF

==== 12 Hours of Bathurst results ====
Year	Team	Co-drivers	Car	Class	Laps	Pos.	Class pos.
2020	(Switzerland) Castrol Racing R-Motorsport	(United Kingdom) Jake Dennis (Australia) Rick Kelly	Aston Martin Vantage AMR GT3	GT3 Pro	308	16th	9th

=== V8 Supercar Championship results ===
(key) (Races in bold indicate pole position) (Races in italics indicate fastest lap)

V8 Supercar results
Year	Team	No.	Car	1	2	3	4	5	6	7	8	9	10	11	12	13	14	15	16	17	18	19	20	21	22	23	24	25	26	27	Pos.	Pts
2010	Kelly Racing	7	Holden VE Commodore	YMC; R1	YMC; R2	BHR; R3	BHR; R4	ADE; R5	ADE; R6	HAM; R7	HAM; R8	QLD; R9	QLD; R10	WIN; R11	WIN; R12	HDV; R13	HDV; R14	TOW; R15	TOW; R16	PHI; Q	PHI; R17	BAT; R18	SUR; R19; 20	SUR; R20; Ret	SYM; R21	SYM; R22	SAN; R23	SAN; R24	SYD; R25	SYD; R26	NC	0†

† Not Eligible for points

=== International Race of Champions ===
(key) (Bold – Pole position. * – Most laps led.)

International Race of Champions results
Year	Make	1	2	3	4	Pos.	Pts	Ref
2004	Pontiac	DAY; 8	TEX; 9	RCH; 9	ATL; 8	10th	26	

== Notes ==
Sporting positions
Preceded by Jason Bright	Australian Drivers' Championship; 1998	Succeeded by Simon Wills
Preceded by Oriol Servià	Indy Lights Champion; 2000	Succeeded by Townsend Bell
Preceded by Sam Hornish Jr. Dario Franchitti; Ryan Hunter-Reay; Will Power; Josef Newgarden; Josef Newgarden	IRL IndyCar Series Champion; 2003; 2008; 2013; 2015; 2018; 2020	Succeeded by Tony Kanaan; Dario Franchitti; Will Power; Simon Pagenaud; Josef Newgarden; Álex Palou
Achievements
Preceded by Dario Franchitti	Indianapolis 500 Winner; 2008	Succeeded by Hélio Castroneves
Awards
Preceded by Kenny Bräck	CART Rookie of the Year; 2001	Succeeded by Mario Domínguez
Preceded by Mahé Drysdale	New Zealand's Sportsman of the Year; 2008; 2013	Succeeded by Mahé Drysdale
Preceded by Mahé Drysdale	New Zealand's Sportsman of the Year; 2008; 2013	Succeeded by Brendon McCullum
