= Oreca 01 =

LMP1 racing car

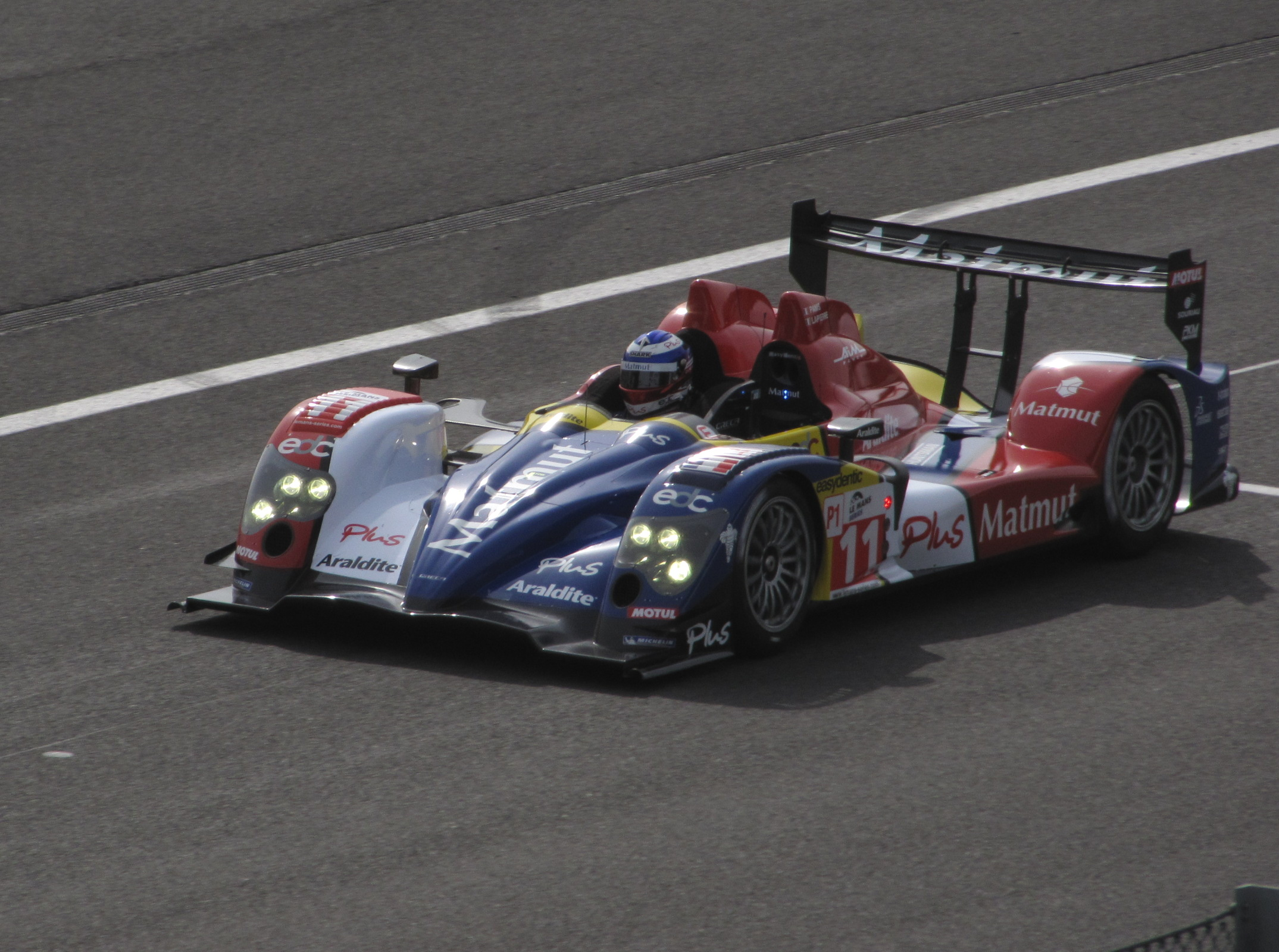
- The No. 11 01 driven by Olivier Panis at the 2009 1000 km of Spa
- Category: Le Mans Prototype (LMP1)
- Constructor: Oreca
- Designer: David Floury

Technical specifications
- Chassis: Carbon fibre monocoque
- Suspension (front): Double wishbone, push rod operated over damper
- Suspension (rear): Double wishbone, push rod operated over damper
- Engine: AIM (Judd) YS5.5 5.5 L V10 naturally aspirated mid-engined, longitudinally mounted
- Transmission: X-Trac 6-speed sequential manual
- Weight: 900kg
- Tyres: Michelin

Competition history
- Notable entrants: (France) Team Oreca Matmut-AIM
- Notable drivers: (Monaco) Stéphane Ortelli (Brazil) Bruno Senna (Portugal) Tiago Monteiro (France) Olivier Panis (France) Nicolas Lapierre (France) Soheil Ayari (France) Didier André
- Debut: 2009 1000 km of Spa
- First win: 2009 1000 km of Silverstone
- Last win: 2009 1000 km of Silverstone
- Last event: 2011 24 Hours of Le Mans
| Races | Wins | Poles | F/Laps |
|---|---|---|---|
| 10 | 1 | 2 | 0 |
- Constructors' Championships: 0
- Drivers' Championships: 0

The Oreca 01 is a Le Mans Prototype built by Oreca Racing in 2009. It replaced the Courage-Oreca LC70 raced previously by Oreca. It is powered by an engine from Japanese engine company AIM Power. It is a tuned Judd engine that develops 650 bhp/485 kW at 8000 rpm.

== Racing ==
=== 2009 ===
Team Oreca Matmut-AIM debuted two Oreca 01's at the 2009 1000 km of Spa, the second round of the 2009 Le Mans Series season. It started off well with the #10 car qualifying fourth place. Unfortunately, Bruno Senna, driving the #10 car had a huge crash after completing 129 of the race winners 143 laps. The accident damage looked identical to the other #10 driver Stéphane Ortelli's crash at the 2008 1000 km of Monza which put him out of the running for the 2008 24 Hours of Le Mans. Luckily, the #11 car did finish, in fourth place getting five points.

At the 2009 24 Hours of Le Mans, the #11 car finished 5th. The #10 did not finish, dropping out after 219 laps.

=== 2010 ===
A single Oreca 01 was entered in the 2010 24 Hours of Le Mans alongside a Peugeot 908 HDi FAP, qualifying with a time of 3:29.506, putting it in 10th place. Despite the Lola-Aston Martins being favoured to win the "petrol" P1 class all 3 of them as well as all 4 Peugeots suffered reliability issues, the Oreca 01 was able to take an impressive 4th place overall, highest petrol-fuel finisher and behind only the 3 factory Audis.

=== 2011 ===
2011 saw the Oreca 01 raced by Swiss team Hope Racing as a hybrid-powered vehicle at Le Mans, using the KERS system featured in Formula One and powered by a Volkswagen-based 2 litre engine. The engine is significantly smaller than the AIM (Judd) V10 engine used before in the 01 as there were changes made to the regulations for the 2011 season. The Oreca 01 did not finish, retiring after 115 laps.

== Competition history ==
=== Complete Le Mans Series results ===
(key) Races in bold indicates pole position. Races in italics indicates fastest lap.

Complete Le Mans Series results
| Year | Entrant | Class | Drivers | No. | Rds. | Rounds | | | | | Pts. | Pos. |
| Year | Entrant | Class | Drivers | No. | Rds. | 1 | 2 | 3 | 4 | 5 | Pts. | Pos. |
|---|---|---|---|---|---|---|---|---|---|---|---|---|
| 2009 | (France) Team Oreca Matmut AIM | LMP1 | (Brazil) Bruno Senna (Monaco) Stéphane Ortelli (Portugal) Tiago Monteiro (France) Nicolas Lapierre (France) Olivier Panis | 10 | 2-3; 2; 3; 5; 5 | CAT | SPA; Ret | POR; 3 | NÜR | **SIL**; **1** | 3rd* | 23* |
| 2009 | (France) Team Oreca Matmut AIM | LMP1 | (France) Nicolas Lapierre (France) Olivier Panis | 11 | 2-3; 2-3 | CAT | SPA; 4 | **POR**; **4** | NÜR | SIL | 11* | 8th* |
| 2010 | (France) AIM Team Oreca Matmut | LMP1 | (France) Soheil Ayari (France) Loïc Duval (France) Didier André | 6 | 1; 1; 1 | LEC; 5 | SPA | POR | HUN | SIL | 17 | 11th |

* Points were scored with the Courage-Oreca LC70E

=== Complete 24 Hours of Le Mans results ===
(key) Races in bold indicates pole position. Races in italics indicates fastest lap.

| Year | Team | Class | No. | Drivers | Position |
|---|---|---|---|---|---|
| 2009 | (France) Team Oreca Matmut AIM | LMP1 | 10 | (Monaco) Stéphane Ortelli (Brazil) Bruno Senna (Portugal) Tiago Monteiro | Ret |
| 2009 | (France) Team Oreca Matmut AIM | LMP1 | 11 | (France) Olivier Panis (France) Nicolas Lapierre (France) Soheil Ayari | 5th |
| 2010 | (France) AIM Team Oreca Matmut | LMP1 | 6 | (France) Soheil Ayari (France) Didier André (United Kingdom) Andy Meyrick | 4th |
| 2011 | (Switzerland) Hope Racing | LMP1 | 5 | (Switzerland) Steve Zacchia (Netherlands) Jan Lammers (Denmark) Casper Elgaard | Ret |

=== Complete American Le Mans Series results ===
(key) Races in bold indicates pole position. Races in italics indicates fastest lap.

| Year | Entrant | Class | Drivers | No. | Rds. | Rounds | | | | | | | | | | Pts. | Pos. |
| Year | Entrant | Class | Drivers | No. | Rds. | 1 | 2 | 3 | 4 | 5 | 6 | 7 | 8 | 9 | 10 | Pts. | Pos. |
|---|---|---|---|---|---|---|---|---|---|---|---|---|---|---|---|---|---|
| 2009 | (France) Team Oreca Matmut AIM | LMP1 | (France) Nicolas Lapierre (France) Olivier Panis (France) Romain Dumas | 7 | 9; 9; 9 | SEB | STP | LBH | UTA | LIM | MOH | ELK | MOS | ATL; 5 | LGA | 0 | NC |
