= 2009 24 Hours of Le Mans =

77th 24 Hours of Le Mans endurance race

Previous: 2008	Next: 2010
Index: Races | Winners

Circuit de la Sarthe track

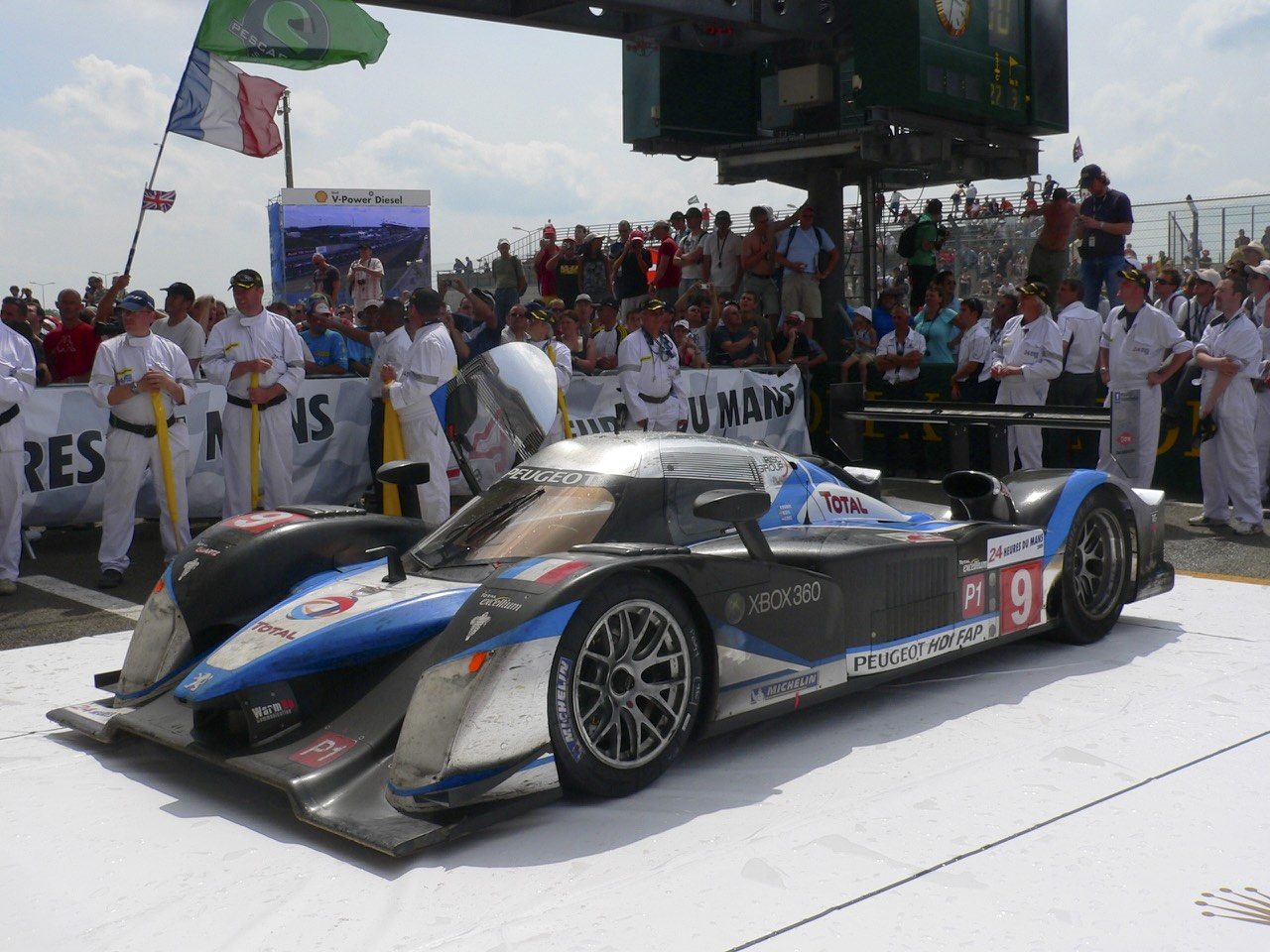
Peugeot 908 HDi FAP, car number 9, winner Le Mans 2009, beneath podium

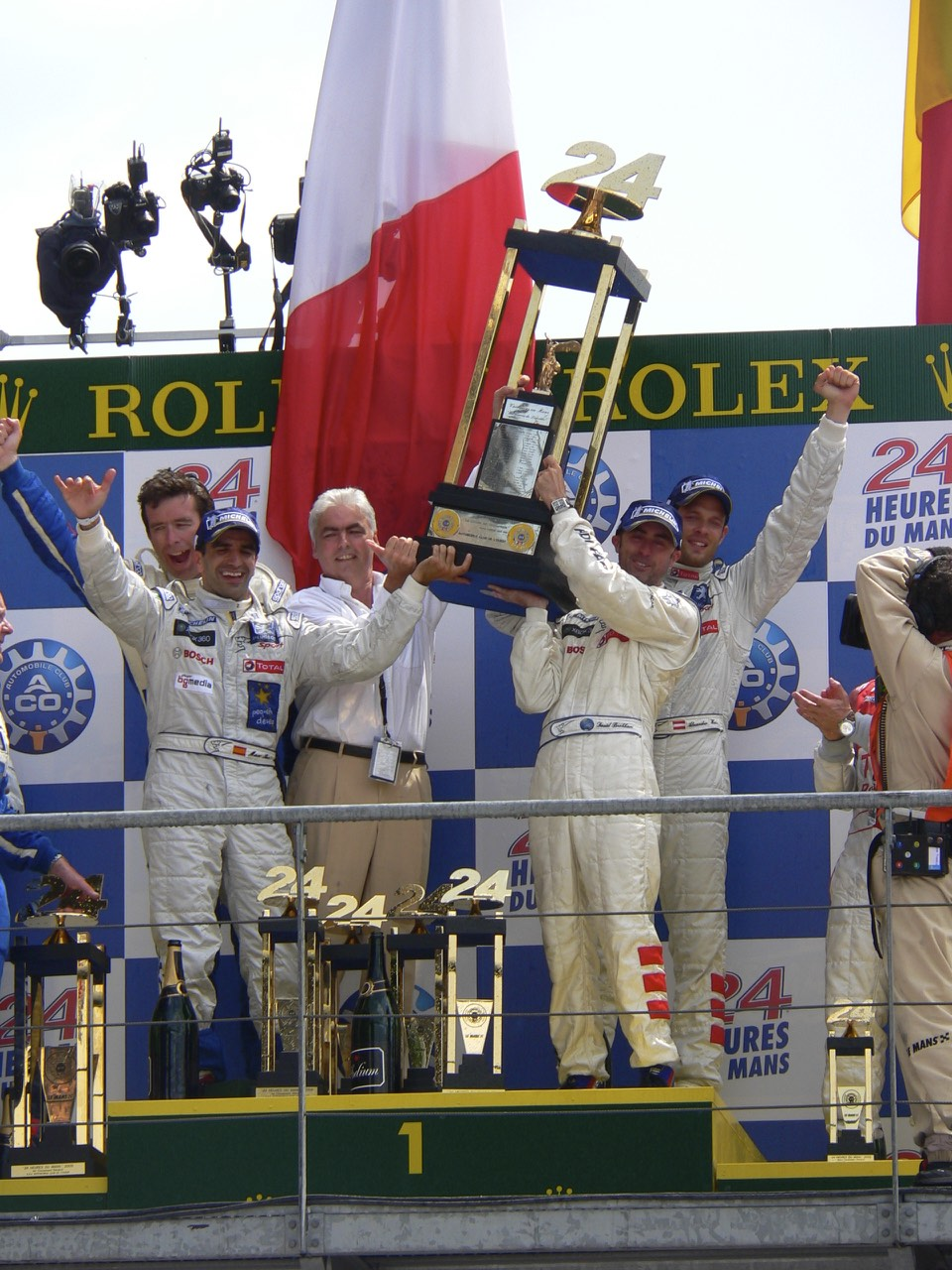
Winning drivers of 24 Hours Le Mans on the podium, 14 June 2009

The 2009 24 Hours of Le Mans (French: 24 Heures du Mans 2009) was the 77th Grand Prix of Endurance, an endurance auto race run over 24 hours. It took place at the Circuit de la Sarthe, Le Mans, France, and was organised by the Automobile Club de l'Ouest (ACO) over 13–14 June 2009 and was started by Fiat and Ferrari chairman Luca Cordero di Montezemolo at 15:00 local time (13:00 UTC). A test day was initially scheduled for 31 May that year, but was canceled by the ACO due to economic concerns. The race was attended by 234,800 spectators.

Peugeot succeeded in winning the race in the third year of the 908 HDi FAP program with drivers David Brabham, Marc Gené, and Alexander Wurz driving the No. 9 car for 382 laps; an all-French driving squad secured second place for Peugeot as well. Audi, who had won eight of the last ten Le Mans, finished third in their new R15 TDI. Team Essex gave Porsche their second LMP2 victory in a row, while the American Corvette Racing team earned their first GT1 win since 2006. Risi Competizione Ferrari led the GT2 category for their second straight victory in the class.

== Schedule ==
Events for the 24 Hours of Le Mans began on 8 June with technical inspections, before initial practice began on 10 June. Due to the cancellation of the May test session, the Wednesday track session has been altered to free practice only, with no qualification times being recorded in the mostly wet session. Qualifying therefore only took place on Thursday, which remained dry.

Schedule
Date	Time (local)	Event
Monday, 8 June	14:30 – 18:00	Sporting Checks and Administrative scrutineering
Tuesday, 9 June	08:30 – 17:00	Sporting Checks and Administrative scrutineering
Wednesday, 10 June	18:00 – 24:00	Free practice
Thursday, 11 June	19:00 – 21:00	Qualifying
Thursday, 11 June	22:00 – 24:00	Qualifying
Friday, 12 June	10:00 – 20:00	Pit Walk
Friday, 12 June	18:00 – 19:00	Drivers' parade in Le Mans City center
Saturday, 13 June	09:00 – 09:45	Warm-up
Saturday, 13 June	14:22	Beginning of starting procedure
Saturday, 13 June	15:00	Start of the 24 Hours of Le Mans
Sunday, 14 June	15:00	Finish of the 24 Hours of Le Mans

== Entries ==
=== Automatic invitations ===
Automatic entry to the 2009 24 Hours of Le Mans was granted to teams that had performed well in the previous year's 24 Hours of Le Mans, as well as the 2008 seasons of the American Le Mans Series, Le Mans Series, FIA GT Championship, and the Petit Le Mans. New for 2009 was an automatic invitation awarded to the team which accumulated the most points in the Michelin Energy Endurance Challenge, as part of the Le Mans Series. The award was based on fuel economy of competitors during each event.

On 20 January 2009, the ACO announced that 15 of the 29 automatic invitations had been accepted by their recipients. Entries with a blue background were granted entries, but did not accept their invitations.

Reason entered	LMP1	LMP2	GT1	GT2
1st in 24 Hours of Le Mans	(Germany) Audi Sport North America	(Netherlands) Van Merksteijn Motorsport	(United Kingdom) Aston Martin Racing	(United States) Risi Competizione
2nd in 24 Hours of Le Mans	(France) Team Peugeot Total	(Denmark) Team Essex	(United States) Corvette Racing	(Italy) BMS Scuderia Italia
1st in Le Mans Series	(Germany) Audi Sport Team Joest	(Netherlands) Van Merksteijn Motorsport	(France) Luc Alphand Aventures	(United Kingdom) Virgo Motorsport
2nd in Le Mans Series	(France) Team Peugeot Total	(Denmark) Team Essex	(United Kingdom) Team Modena	(Germany) Team Felbermayr-Proton
1st in Petit Le Mans	(United States) Audi Sport North America	(United States) Penske Motorsports, Inc.	(United States) Corvette Racing	(United States) Risi Competizione
1st in American Le Mans Series	(United States) Intersport Racing^{1}	(United States) Penske Racing	(United States) Bell Motorsports^{2}	(United States) Flying Lizard Motorsports
1st in FIA GT Championship			(Germany) Vitaphone Racing Team	(Italy) AF Corse
2nd in FIA GT Championship			(Germany) Phoenix Carsport Racing	(Italy) BMS Scuderia Italia
1st in Energy Endurance Challenge		(Switzerland) Horag Racing		

1. Due to Audi Sport North America already earning two entries (first in previous 24 Hours of Le Mans and first at Petit Le Mans), they could not receive the automatic invitation for also winning the American Le Mans Series championship. The entry was instead given to the team which finished second in the championship.

2. Due to Corvette Racing already earning two entries (second in previous 24 Hours of Le Mans and first at Petit Le Mans), they could not receive the automatic invitation for also winning the American Le Mans Series championship. The entry was instead given to the team which finished second in the championship.

=== Applications ===
Prior to the deadline for applications, 82 separate entries by teams representing 17 countries were received by the ACO. This amount is only six less than the total of applications received for the previous running of the 24 Hours of Le Mans. The ACO Selection Committee decided on which teams were invited to fill the remaining 40 positions alongside those teams who had already received automatic invitations, along with ten reserve entries.

=== Entry list ===
On 26 February, the ACO announced their list of 55 entries which will be invited to take part in the 2009 24 Hours of Le Mans. 21 cars within the LMP1 category include Audi, Peugeot, and Aston Martin with three cars each, as well as private entries for the Kolles Audis, Pescarolo Peugeot, and Speedy-Sebah Aston Martin. This also made a total of nine cars which would be using diesel fuel. LMP2 featured previous race winners Team Goh in a previous winning car, the Porsche RS Spyder, joined by last year's runner-up Team Essex. Mazda supplied engines for four entries, split amongst the Lola and Pescarolo chassis.

The GT1 category was fought amongst three manufacturers, as Corvette Racing and Luc Alphand Aventures attempted to overcome the two private Aston Martin and Lamborghini entries. GT2 was once again dominated by the Ferrari and Porsche battle, although Ferrari had the power of numbers with its ten entries compared to Porsche's five. Sole entries from Spyker and the Drayson Aston Martin completed the GT2 field.

==== Reserve entries ====
Ten entries are granted a reserve entry, in case an entry from the list of 55 withdraws prior to the event. These ten entries will be allowed to join the race entry list in the order they are listed here, regardless of their class.

On 31 March, Gigawave Motorsport withdrew their Aston Martin from the GT1 category of the entry list in order to concentrate on their development of the Nissan GT-R program. This promoted Advanced Engineering/Team Seattle from the reserve list to the entry list. Three days later Epsilon Euskadi withdrew their LMP1 entry which was replaced by the Endurance China Team. Epsilon Euskadi also withdrew their second entry from the reserve list. On 29 April, it was announced that Vitaphone Racing withdrew their LMP2 entry and was replaced by a second IMSA Performance Matmut GT2 entry. Racing Box also announced that they withdrew their LMP2 reserve entry. IPB Spartak Racing announced their withdrawal from the event on 15 May because one of their drivers, Peter Kox, was unable to participate in the race. It was replaced by the Barazi-Epsilon LMP2 entry.

On 22 May, reserve entries were no longer able to be accepted into the race, regardless of further withdrawals. The entries of Gerard Welter's WR-Zytek LMP2, Team Felbermayr-Proton's Porsche GT2, Snoras Spyker Squadron's Spyker GT2, and Larbre Compétition's Saleen GT1 were the only remaining reserves at the time of the entry list closure.

== Free practice ==
After the cancellation of the test session, Wednesday's schedule was changed from a qualifying session to a six-hour free practice. Track conditions varied as rain arrived several times during the practice, limiting the amount of time available with a dry circuit. Audi led the session with Allan McNish setting a fastest lap of 3:30.708 in the No. 1 car, followed immediately by the No. 2 Audi. The best Peugeot was the No. 9 car, followed immediately by the privately entered Pescarolo Sport Peugeot. The fastest LMP1 not running a diesel engine was the second Pescarolo entry with a time of 3:35.868, followed by the No. 008 and No. 007 Aston Martins.

The LMP2 category was led by the Porsche RS Spyders, with Team Essex's 3:46.426 ahead of the Navi Team Goh entry. Quifel ASM Team's Ginetta-Zytek was a distant third, ten seconds behind Team Essex. Corvette Racing were at the front of GT1, with the No. 63's 3:57.876 lap time ahead of the No. 64 car. Jetalliance Racing were third while the two Luc Alphand Corvettes did few laps after fixing an incorrectly installed rollcage and the JLOC Lamborghini did not complete a lap after breaking a driveshaft. Porsche were ahead of Ferrari in the GT2 category, with Felbermayr-Proton ahead of the Risi Competizione. Spyker Squadron were able to reach third in the class.

The only major incident of the practice session was an accident by KSM's driver Jean de Pourtales. The driver spun approaching the Dunlop Chicane, impacting a concrete barrier before sliding into a tire barrier. The second impact ripped much of the rear of the car off.

== Qualifying ==
Stéphane Sarrazin claimed his third consecutive pole position at Le Mans, planting the No. 8 Peugeot at the front of the field with a lap time of 3:22.888. He set the lap on the third of his flying laps during a run near the end of the four-hour qualifying session, bettering Allan McNish's lap time by 0.8 seconds. McNish's lap was set on the final lap of the first two-hour qualifying session, beating the Peugeot of Franck Montagny who led much of the first session. McNish's lap remained at the top of the charts for much of the second session until Sarrazin's performance. Peugeot planned to practice race setups during the entire qualifying session, and were not seeking to obtain the pole position.

At the end of qualifying Peugeots filled the next three places on the grid behind the front row with the car of Pescarolo Sport settling in at fourth fastest. Aston Martin were able to secure the fastest lap for a petrol-powered car, with the No. 007 entry on a few thousandths of a second behind the No. 3 Audi and followed by the No. 008 Aston Martin and No. 13 Speedy Racing Team Sebah Aston Martin.

The Porsche RS Spyders continued their dominance in the LMP2 category, with Casper Elgaard of Team Essex ahead of Team Goh with a lap time of 3:37.720. Third in the category was the No. 33 Speedy Racing Team Sebah Lola-Judd which was over three seconds behind the Porsches. Corvette Racing secured the front row in the GT1 category, with Jan Magnussen's No. 63 entry half a second ahead of the No. 64 sister car. Jetalliance Racing's privately entered Aston Martin was under two seconds behind, and followed immediately by the two Luc Alphand Corvettes. The JLOC Lamborghini struggled with mechanical issues and was never able to lift itself from last place on grid.

The GT2 category was led by Porsche who bested their rivals Ferrari with two cars. Pole winner Flying Lizard Motorsports' 4:03.202 was less than a tenth of a second ahead of the No. 77 Felbermayr-Proton car. Risi Competizione led the Ferrari fight with a third place qualifying time, joined by JMB Racing and BMS Scuderia Italia. The Aston Martin of Drayson Racing was ninth in the category, while the Spyker was eleventh.

Several incidents occurred during the qualifying session. The Pescarolo Peugeot drive by Jean-Christophe Boullion spun at the Tetre Rouge corner and ripped the left front fender off the car after impacting the wall. The Peugeot was able to return to the pits and be repaired. The No. 007 Aston Martin also hit a wall after losing control during braking for the second chicane on the Mulsanne Straight. Jan Charouz was traveling at 270 km/h (170 mph) at the time of the incident. The incident occurred in the closing minutes of qualifying, but the car was repaired.

=== Qualifying results ===
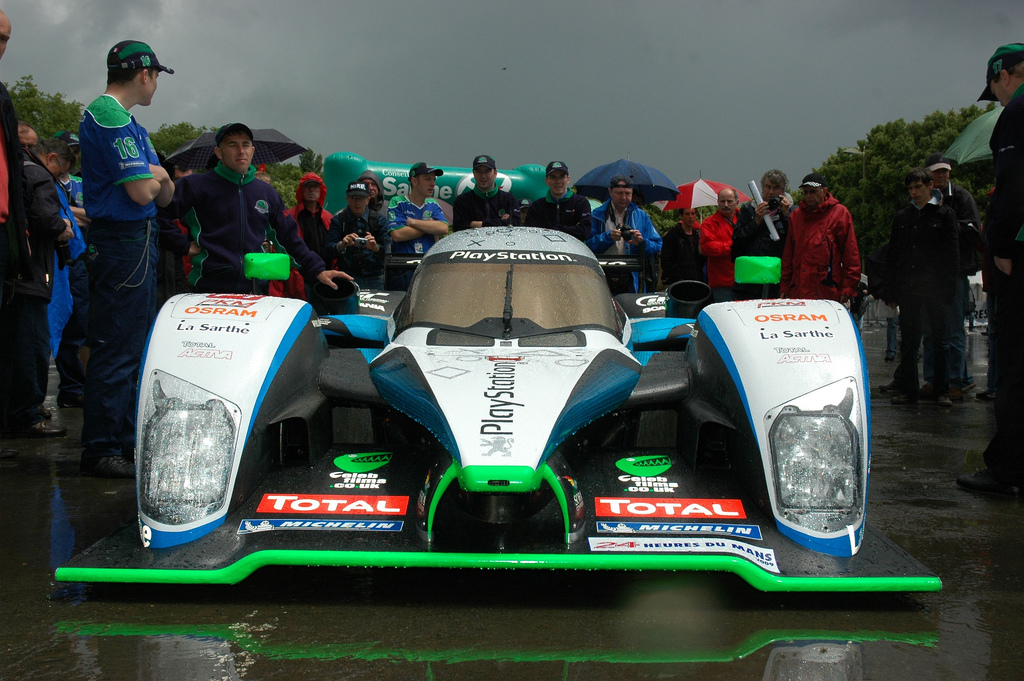
Despite using a 2008-spec Peugeot 908 HDi FAP, Pescarolo Sport qualified fourth.

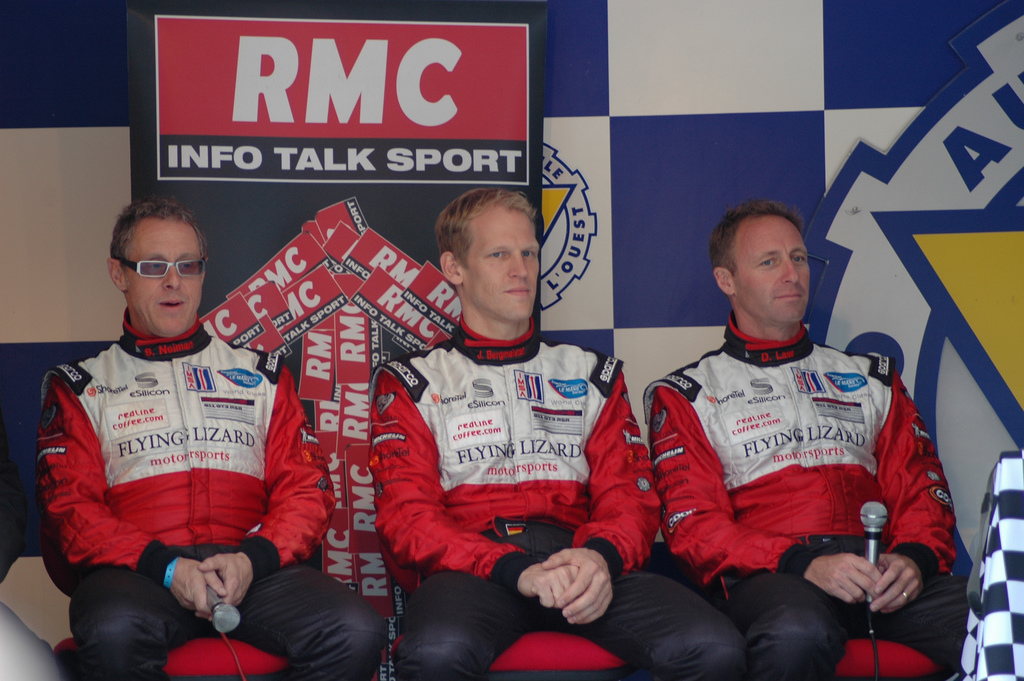
Drivers Seth Neiman, Darren Law, and Jörg Bergmeister earned the pole position in the GT2 class for Flying Lizard Motorsports.

Class leaders are in bold.

Pos	No.	Team	Car	Class	Time	Gap
1	**8**	**Team Peugeot Total**	**Peugeot 908 HDi FAP**	**LMP1**	**3:22.888**	
2	1	Audi Sport Team Joest	Audi R15 TDI	LMP1	3:23.650	+0.762
3	7	Team Peugeot Total	Peugeot 908 HDi FAP	LMP1	3:24.860	+1.972
4	17	Pescarolo Sport	Peugeot 908 HDi FAP	LMP1	3:25.062	+2.174
5	9	Peugeot Sport Total	Peugeot 908 HDi FAP	LMP1	3:25.252	+2.364
6	2	Audi Sport North America	Audi R15 TDI	LMP1	3:25.780	+2.892
7	3	Audi Sport Team Joest	Audi R15 TDI	LMP1	3:27.106	+4.218
8	007	AMR Eastern Europe	Lola-Aston Martin B09/60	LMP1	3:27.180	+4.292
9	008	Aston Martin Racing	Lola-Aston Martin B09/60	LMP1	3:27.704	+4.816
10	13	Speedy Racing Team Sebah	Lola B08/60-Aston Martin	LMP1	3:28.134	+5.246
11	23	Strakka Racing	Ginetta-Zytek GZ09S	LMP1	3:29.798	+6.910
12	16	Pescarolo Sport	Pescarolo 01-Judd	LMP1	3:30.466	+7.578
13	15	Kolles	Audi R10 TDI	LMP1	3:31.192	+8.304
14	14	Kolles	Audi R10 TDI	LMP1	3:31.548	+8.660
15	10	Team Oreca Matmut AIM	Oreca 01-AIM	LMP1	3:33.514	+10.626
16	11	Team Oreca Matmut AIM	Oreca 01-AIM	LMP1	3:33.860	+10.972
17	009	Aston Martin Racing	Lola-Aston Martin B09/60	LMP1	3:33.968	+11.080
18	6	Team LNT	Ginetta-Zytek GZ09S	LMP1	3:35.804	+12.916
19	4	Creation Autosportif	Creation CA07	LMP1	3:36.552	+13.072
20	**31**	**Team Essex**	**Porsche RS Spyder Evo**	**LMP2**	**3:37.720**	**+14.832**
21	5	Navi Team Goh	Porsche RS Spyder Evo	LMP2	3:37.802	+14.914
22	12	Signature Plus	Courage-Oreca LC70E-Judd	LMP1	3:39.326	+16.438
23	33	Speedy Racing Team Sebah	Lola B08/80-Judd	LMP2	3:41.724	+18.836
24	25	RML	Lola B08/80-Mazda MZR-R	LMP2	3:41.952	+19.064
25	40	Quifel ASM Team	Ginetta-Zytek GZ09S/2	LMP2	3:42.012	+19.124
26	30	Racing Box	Lola B08/80-Judd	LMP2	3:42.848	+19.960
27	41	GAC Racing Team	Zytek 07S/2	LMP2	3:44.830	+21.942
28	35	OAK Racing	Pescarolo 01-Mazda MZR-R	LMP2	3:45.032	+22.144
29	32	Barazi-Epsilon	Zytek 07S/2	LMP2	3:52.956	+30.068
30	39	KSM	Lola B07/46	LMP2	3:53.072	+30.184
31	**63**	**Corvette Racing**	**Chevrolet Corvette C6.R**	**GT1**	**3:54.230**	**+31.342**
32	64	Corvette Racing	Chevrolet Corvette C6.R	GT1	3:54.702	+31.814
33	26	Bruichladdich-Bruneau Team	Radical SR9-AER	LMP2	3:55.320	+32.432
34	66	Jetalliance Racing	Aston Martin DBR9	GT1	3:56.126	+33.238
35	72	Luc Alphand Aventures	Chevrolet Corvette C6.R	GT1	3:57.170	+34.282
36	24	OAK Racing	Pescarolo 01-Mazda MZR-R	LMP2	3:57.524	+34.636
37	73	Luc Alphand Aventures	Chevrolet Corvette C6.R	GT1	4:00.528	+35.676
38	**80**	**Flying Lizard Motorsports**	**Porsche 997 GT3-RSR**	**GT2**	**4:03.202**	**+40.314**
39	77	Team Felbermayr-Proton	Porsche 997 GT3-RSR	GT2	4:03.232	+40.344
40	82	Risi Competizione	Ferrari F430 GT2	GT2	4:04.056	+41.168
41	99	JMB Racing	Ferrari F430 GT2	GT2	4:04.084	+41.196
42	97	BMS Scuderia Italia	Ferrari F430 GT2	GT2	4:04.222	+41.334
43	76	IMSA Performance Matmut	Porsche 997 GT3-RSR	GT2	4:04.648	+41.760
44	78	AF Corse	Ferrari F430 GT2	GT2	4:04.938	+42.050
45	92	JMW Motorsport	Ferrari F430 GT2	GT2	4:05.168	+42.280
46	87	Drayson Racing	Aston Martin V8 Vantage GT2	GT2	4:06.482	+43.594
47	89	Hankook Team Farnbacher	Ferrari F430 GT2	GT2	4:06.612	+43.724
48	85	Snoras Spyker Squadron	Spyker C8 Laviolette GT2-R-Audi	GT2	4:08.348	+45.460
49	84	Team Modena	Ferrari F430 GT2	GT2	4:08.508	+45.620
50	83	Risi Competizione	Ferrari F430 GT2	GT2	4:08.758	+45.870
51	70	IMSA Performance Matmut	Porsche 997 GT3-RSR	GT2	4:10.014	+47.126
52	75	Endurance Asia Team	Porsche 997 GT3-RSR	GT2	4:10.456	+47.568
53	96	Virgo Motorsport	Ferrari F430 GT2	GT2	4:10.664	+47.776
54	81	Advanced Engineering	Ferrari F430 GT2	GT2	4:13.920	+51.032
55	68	JLOC	Lamborghini Murciélago R-GT	GT1	4:21.812	+58.924

== Race ==
New rules have caused the diesels to become considerably slower than the previous year. Peugeot qualified 4 seconds slower than 2008 but still maintained the speed advantage over the new Audi R15. Audi's lack of testing meant that the cars struggled to get any sort of a good setup. All works drivers complained about understeer in the Le Mans aero package on the R15. Tom Kristensen commented that the high-downforce package like the one used at Sebring were much better. The R15 also struggled to get beyond a double-stint.

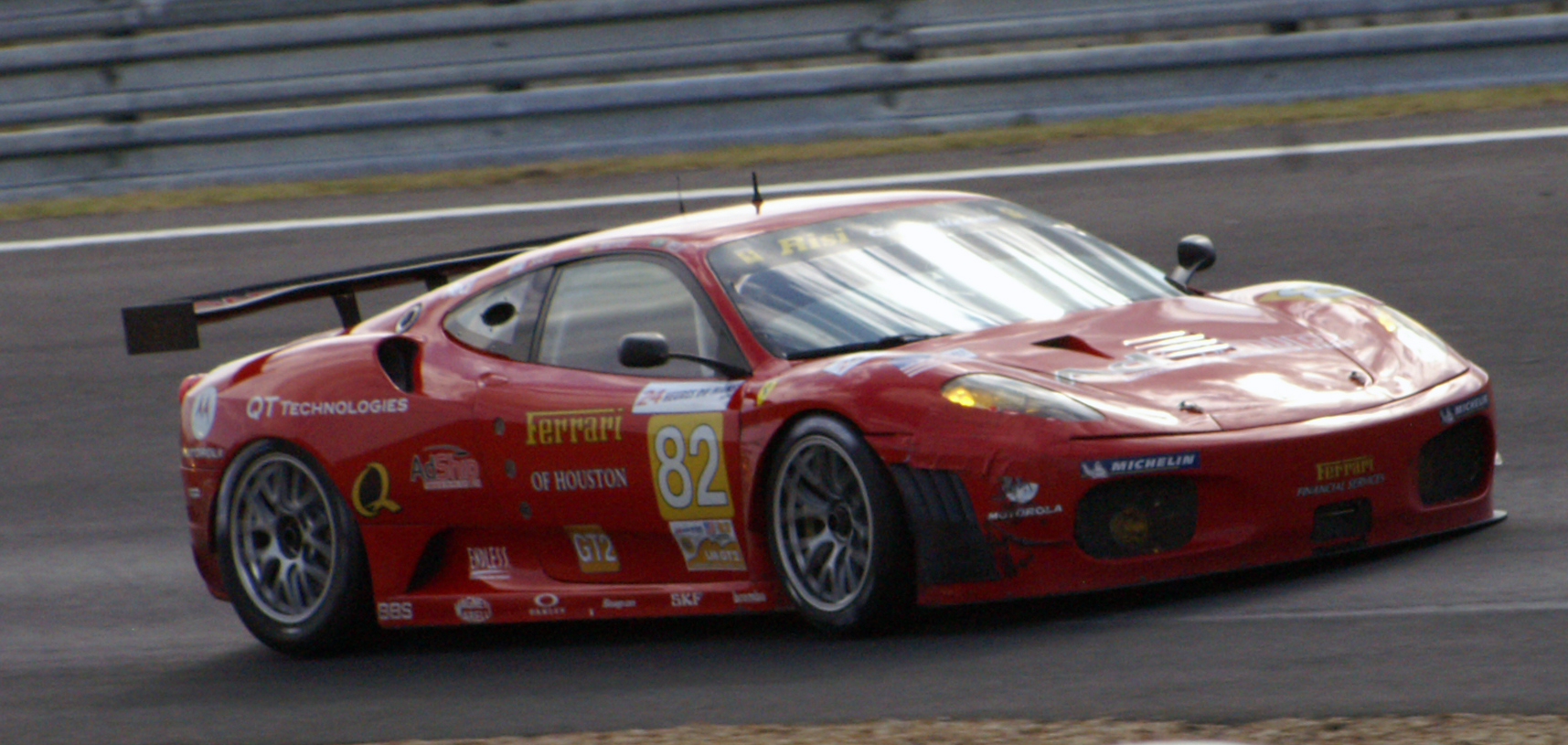
The No. 82 Ferrari F430 GT2 of Risi Competizione took first place in GT2

The race began at 15:00 local time (UTC+2) 13 June 2009, with Franck Montagny in the pole position Peugeot 908 HDi FAP leading the field. The race was started by the waving of the French tricolour by Fiat and Ferrari chairman Luca Cordero di Montezemolo, honoring the 60th anniversary of Ferrari's first victory at Le Mans.

In the LMP1 class, the Peugeots showed they could maintain a pace that the Audis struggled to maintain over the full run. The #7 Peugeot was released too early and hit from the side by the Pescarolo Peugeot. The initial damage was a small puncture but the resulting damage destroyed the whole left rear end of the car. Two of the three Audis had off-track excursions in the first 12 hours; one resulting in the #2 car being out of the race on lap 104. During the early evening, the #1 Audi lost a lap to the leading Peugeot. Further technical issues would see it lose another seven laps in total to the winner. In LMP2, the Navi Team Goh Porsche RS Spyder qualified 2nd overall and maintained a solid pace until crashing heavily with one hour to go, allowing the pole-sitting #31 Team Essex Porsche to carry on to the win.

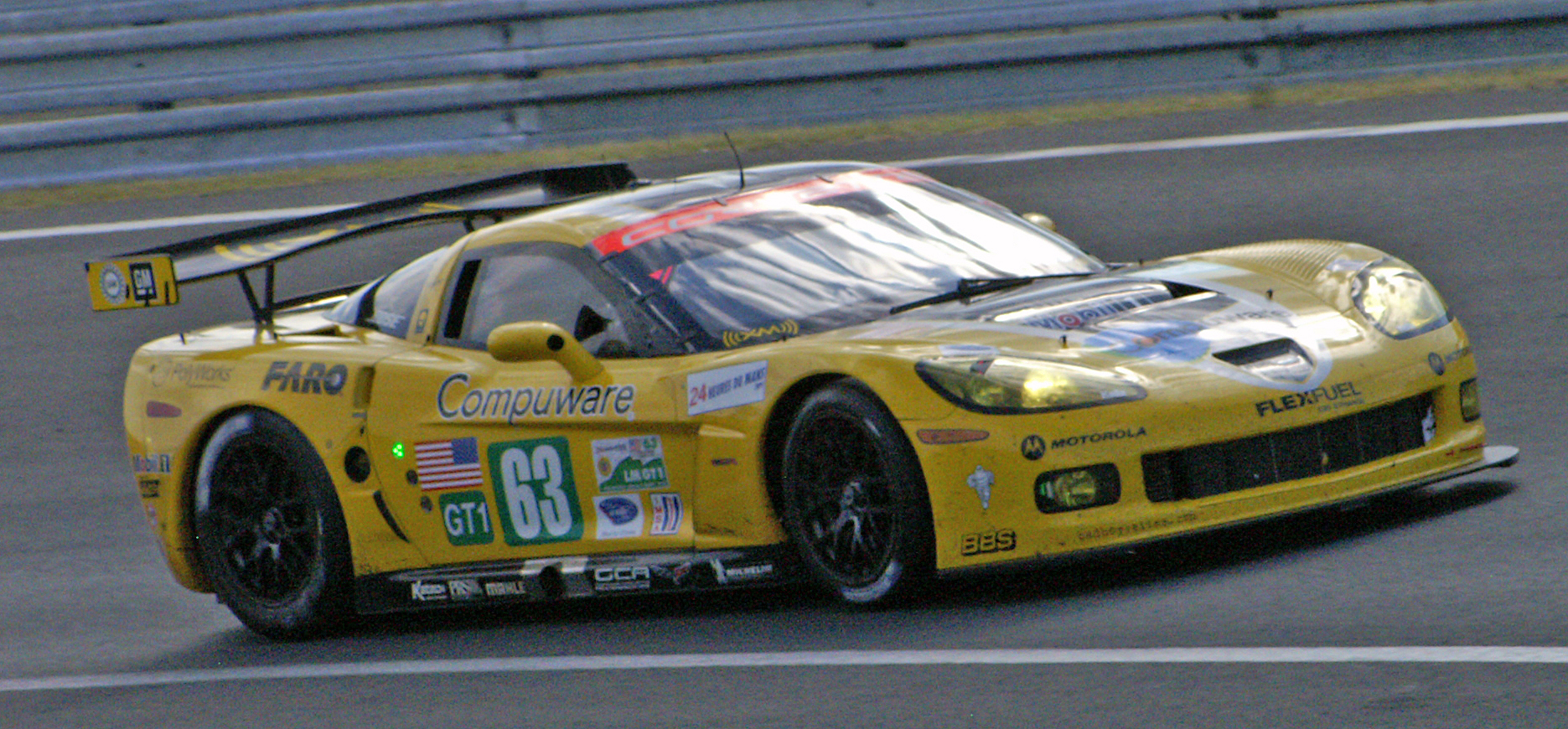
The No. 63 works team Corvette C6.R took pole and first place in GT1

In GT1, the final outing of the Chevrolet Corvette C6.R as a factory team at Le Mans ended well, with the #63 car driven by O'Connell, Magnussen and García sitting on the pole and finishing first in class. Magnussen was sick early on, which left O'Connell and Garcia to finish the race as a two-driver team. Several other teams were stricken with the loss of a driver, most notable being the LMP1 #009 Lola-Aston, whose driver Stuart Hall was excluded when he collided with the LMP2 #26 Radical, and the stewards determined his fault to be substantial. Another team with a driver that was excluded was Kolles' Narain Karthikeyan as he dislocated his shoulder going over the pitwall before the race, leaving Charles Zwolsman Jr. and André Lotterer to do the whole 24 hours, yet they finished a respectable 7th in P1 and 7th overall.

In GT2, Ferrari celebrated their 60th Anniversary win with Ferraris taking the first 4 spots, the Risi Competizione #82 Ferrari F430 GT2 heading the class.

New rules requiring only one man with one airgun in the pits were aimed to lower the overall costs of the event by causing teams to double or triple stint tires due to the time needed to replace them.

== Official results ==
Class winners are marked in bold. Cars running at the finish but failing to complete 70% of the winner's distance are marked as Not Classified.

Pos	Class Pos.	Class	No	Team	Drivers	Chassis	Tyre	Laps
Pos	Class Pos.	Class	No	Team	Drivers	Engine	Tyre	Laps
1	1	**LMP1**	**9**	**(France) Peugeot Sport Total**	**(Australia) David Brabham (Spain) Marc Gené (Austria) Alexander Wurz**	**Peugeot 908 HDi FAP**	MI	**382**
1	1	**LMP1**	**9**	**(France) Peugeot Sport Total**	**(Australia) David Brabham (Spain) Marc Gené (Austria) Alexander Wurz**	**Peugeot HDi 5.5 L Turbo V12 (Diesel)**	MI	**382**
2	2	LMP1	8	(France) Team Peugeot Total	(France) Franck Montagny (France) Sébastien Bourdais (France) Stéphane Sarrazin	Peugeot 908 HDi FAP	MI	381
2	2	LMP1	8	(France) Team Peugeot Total	(France) Franck Montagny (France) Sébastien Bourdais (France) Stéphane Sarrazin	Peugeot HDi 5.5 L Turbo V12 (Diesel)	MI	381
3	3	LMP1	1	(Germany) Audi Sport Team Joest	(Denmark) Tom Kristensen (United Kingdom) Allan McNish (Italy) Rinaldo Capello	Audi R15 TDI	MI	376
3	3	LMP1	1	(Germany) Audi Sport Team Joest	(Denmark) Tom Kristensen (United Kingdom) Allan McNish (Italy) Rinaldo Capello	Audi TDI 5.5 L Turbo V10 (Diesel)	MI	376
4	4	LMP1	007	(Czech Republic) AMR Eastern Europe	(Czech Republic) Jan Charouz (Czech Republic) Tomáš Enge (Germany) Stefan Mücke	Lola-Aston Martin B09/60	MI	373
4	4	LMP1	007	(Czech Republic) AMR Eastern Europe	(Czech Republic) Jan Charouz (Czech Republic) Tomáš Enge (Germany) Stefan Mücke	Aston Martin 6.0 L V12	MI	373
5	5	LMP1	11	(France) Team Oreca Matmut AIM	(France) Olivier Panis (France) Nicolas Lapierre (France) Soheil Ayari	Oreca 01	MI	370
5	5	LMP1	11	(France) Team Oreca Matmut AIM	(France) Olivier Panis (France) Nicolas Lapierre (France) Soheil Ayari	AIM YS5.5 5.5 L V10	MI	370
6	6	LMP1	7	(France) Team Peugeot Total	(France) Nicolas Minassian (Portugal) Pedro Lamy (Austria) Christian Klien	Peugeot 908 HDi FAP	MI	369
6	6	LMP1	7	(France) Team Peugeot Total	(France) Nicolas Minassian (Portugal) Pedro Lamy (Austria) Christian Klien	Peugeot HDi 5.5 L Turbo V12 (Diesel)	MI	369
7	7	LMP1	14	(Germany) Kolles (Note: Narain Karthikeyan, who was nominated as the starting driver for the No. 14 Kolles entry, dislocated his shoulder going over the pitwall before the formation lap. He was unable to take part in the race and was therefore not credited with seventh place.)	(Netherlands) Charles Zwolsman Jr. (Germany) André Lotterer	Audi R10 TDI	MI	369
7	7	LMP1	14	(Germany) Kolles	(Netherlands) Charles Zwolsman Jr. (Germany) André Lotterer	Audi TDI 5.5 L Turbo V12 (Diesel)	MI	369
8	8	LMP1	16	(France) Pescarolo Sport	(France) Christophe Tinseau (France) Bruce Jouanny (Portugal) João Barbosa	Pescarolo 01	MI	368
8	8	LMP1	16	(France) Pescarolo Sport	(France) Christophe Tinseau (France) Bruce Jouanny (Portugal) João Barbosa	Judd GV5.5 S2 5.5 L V10	MI	368
9	9	LMP1	15	(Germany) Kolles	(Denmark) Christian Bakkerud (Netherlands) Christijan Albers (Switzerland) Giorgio Mondini	Audi R10 TDI	MI	360
9	9	LMP1	15	(Germany) Kolles	(Denmark) Christian Bakkerud (Netherlands) Christijan Albers (Switzerland) Giorgio Mondini	Audi TDI 5.5 L Turbo V12 (Diesel)	MI	360
10	1	**LMP2**	**31**	**(Denmark) Team Essex**	**(Denmark) Casper Elgaard (Denmark) Kristian Poulsen (France) Emmanuel Collard**	**Porsche RS Spyder Evo**	MI	**357**
10	1	**LMP2**	**31**	**(Denmark) Team Essex**	**(Denmark) Casper Elgaard (Denmark) Kristian Poulsen (France) Emmanuel Collard**	**Porsche MR6 3.4 L V8**	MI	**357**
11	10	LMP1	12	(France) Signature Plus	(France) Pierre Ragues (France) Franck Mailleux (France) Didier André	Courage-Oreca LC70E	MI	344
11	10	LMP1	12	(France) Signature Plus	(France) Pierre Ragues (France) Franck Mailleux (France) Didier André	Judd GV5.5 S2 5.5 L V10	MI	344
12	2	LMP2	33	(Switzerland) Speedy Racing Team (United Kingdom) Sebah Automotive	(Switzerland) Benjamin Leuenberger (France) Xavier Pompidou (United Kingdom) Jonny Kane	Lola B08/80	MI	343
12	2	LMP2	33	(Switzerland) Speedy Racing Team (United Kingdom) Sebah Automotive	(Switzerland) Benjamin Leuenberger (France) Xavier Pompidou (United Kingdom) Jonny Kane	Judd DB 3.4 L V8	MI	343
13	11	LMP1	008	(United Kingdom) Aston Martin Racing	(United Kingdom) Anthony Davidson (United Kingdom) Darren Turner (Netherlands) Jos Verstappen	Lola-Aston Martin B09/60	MI	342
13	11	LMP1	008	(United Kingdom) Aston Martin Racing	(United Kingdom) Anthony Davidson (United Kingdom) Darren Turner (Netherlands) Jos Verstappen	Aston Martin 6.0 L V12	MI	342
14	12	LMP1	13	(Switzerland) Speedy Racing Team (United Kingdom) Sebah Automotive	(Italy) Andrea Belicchi (France) Nicolas Prost (Switzerland) Neel Jani	Lola B08/60	MI	342
14	12	LMP1	13	(Switzerland) Speedy Racing Team (United Kingdom) Sebah Automotive	(Italy) Andrea Belicchi (France) Nicolas Prost (Switzerland) Neel Jani	Aston Martin 6.0 L V12	MI	342
15	1	**GT1**	**63**	**(United States) Corvette Racing**	**(United States) Johnny O'Connell (Denmark) Jan Magnussen (Spain) Antonio García**	**Chevrolet Corvette C6.R**	MI	**342**
15	1	**GT1**	**63**	**(United States) Corvette Racing**	**(United States) Johnny O'Connell (Denmark) Jan Magnussen (Spain) Antonio García**	**Chevrolet LS7.R 7.0 L V8**	MI	**342**
16	2	GT1	73	(France) Luc Alphand Aventures	(Netherlands) Xavier Maassen (France) Yann Clairay (France) Julien Jousse	Chevrolet Corvette C6.R	D	336
16	2	GT1	73	(France) Luc Alphand Aventures	(Netherlands) Xavier Maassen (France) Yann Clairay (France) Julien Jousse	Chevrolet LS7.R 7.0 L V8	D	336
17	13	LMP1	3	(Germany) Audi Sport Team Joest	(Germany) Timo Bernhard (France) Romain Dumas (France) Alexandre Prémat	Audi R15 TDI	MI	333
17	13	LMP1	3	(Germany) Audi Sport Team Joest	(Germany) Timo Bernhard (France) Romain Dumas (France) Alexandre Prémat	Audi TDI 5.5 L Turbo V10 (Diesel)	MI	333
18	1	**GT2**	**82**	**(United States) Risi Competizione**	**(Brazil) Jaime Melo (Germany) Pierre Kaffer (Finland) Mika Salo**	**Ferrari F430 GT2**	MI	**329**
18	1	**GT2**	**82**	**(United States) Risi Competizione**	**(Brazil) Jaime Melo (Germany) Pierre Kaffer (Finland) Mika Salo**	**Ferrari 4.0 L V8**	MI	**329**
19	2	GT2	97	(Italy) BMS Scuderia Italia	(Italy) Fabio Babini (Italy) Matteo Malucelli (Italy) Paolo Ruberti	Ferrari F430 GT2	P	327
19	2	GT2	97	(Italy) BMS Scuderia Italia	(Italy) Fabio Babini (Italy) Matteo Malucelli (Italy) Paolo Ruberti	Ferrari 4.0 L V8	P	327
20	3	LMP2	24	OAK Racing; Team Mazda France	(France) Jacques Nicolet (Monaco) Richard Hein (France) Jean-François Yvon	Pescarolo 01	D	325
20	3	LMP2	24	OAK Racing; Team Mazda France	(France) Jacques Nicolet (Monaco) Richard Hein (France) Jean-François Yvon	Mazda MZR-R 2.0 L Turbo I4	D	325
21	14	LMP1	23	(United Kingdom) Strakka Racing	(United Kingdom) Nick Leventis (United Kingdom) Peter Hardman (United Kingdom) Danny Watts	Ginetta-Zytek GZ09S	MI	325
21	14	LMP1	23	(United Kingdom) Strakka Racing	(United Kingdom) Nick Leventis (United Kingdom) Peter Hardman (United Kingdom) Danny Watts	Zytek ZJ458 4.5 L V8	MI	325
22	3	GT2	83	(United States) Risi Competizione (United States) Krohn Racing	(United States) Tracy Krohn (Belgium) Eric van de Poele (Sweden) Niclas Jönsson	Ferrari F430 GT2	MI	323
22	3	GT2	83	(United States) Risi Competizione (United States) Krohn Racing	(United States) Tracy Krohn (Belgium) Eric van de Poele (Sweden) Niclas Jönsson	Ferrari 4.0 L V8	MI	323
23	4	GT2	92	(United Kingdom) JMW Motorsport	(United Kingdom) Rob Bell (United Kingdom) Andrew Kirkaldy (United Kingdom) Tim Sugden	Ferrari F430 GT2	D	320
23	4	GT2	92	(United Kingdom) JMW Motorsport	(United Kingdom) Rob Bell (United Kingdom) Andrew Kirkaldy (United Kingdom) Tim Sugden	Ferrari 4.0 L V8	D	320
24	15	LMP1	4	(United Kingdom) Creation Autosportif	(United Kingdom) Jamie Campbell-Walter (Belgium) Vanina Ickx (France) Romain Iannetta	Creation CA07	MI	319
24	15	LMP1	4	(United Kingdom) Creation Autosportif	(United Kingdom) Jamie Campbell-Walter (Belgium) Vanina Ickx (France) Romain Iannetta	Judd GV5.5 S2 5.5 L V10	MI	319
25	5	GT2	85	(Netherlands) Snoras Spyker Squadron	(Netherlands) Tom Coronel (Netherlands) Jeroen Bleekemolen (Czech Republic) Jaroslav Janiš	Spyker C8 Laviolette GT2-R	MI	319
25	5	GT2	85	(Netherlands) Snoras Spyker Squadron	(Netherlands) Tom Coronel (Netherlands) Jeroen Bleekemolen (Czech Republic) Jaroslav Janiš	Audi 3.8 L V8	MI	319
26	6	GT2	78	(Italy) AF Corse	(Italy) Gianmaria Bruni (Argentina) Luis Pérez Companc (Argentina) Matías Russo	Ferrari F430 GT2	MI	317
26	6	GT2	78	(Italy) AF Corse	(Italy) Gianmaria Bruni (Argentina) Luis Pérez Companc (Argentina) Matías Russo	Ferrari 4.0 L V8	MI	317
27	7	GT2	84	(United Kingdom) Team Modena	(United Kingdom) Leo Mansell (Germany) Pierre Ehret (Russia) Roman Rusinov	Ferrari F430 GT2	MI	314
27	7	GT2	84	(United Kingdom) Team Modena	(United Kingdom) Leo Mansell (Germany) Pierre Ehret (Russia) Roman Rusinov	Ferrari 4.0 L V8	MI	314
28	4	LMP2	32	(France) Barazi-Epsilon	(Denmark) Juan Barazi (United Kingdom) Phil Bennett (United Kingdom) Stuart Moseley	Zytek 07S/2	D	306
28	4	LMP2	32	(France) Barazi-Epsilon	(Denmark) Juan Barazi (United Kingdom) Phil Bennett (United Kingdom) Stuart Moseley	Zytek 2ZG348 3.4 L V8	D	306
29	8	GT2	99	(Monaco) JMB Racing	(France) Manuel Rodrigues (France) Yvan Lebon (France) Christophe Bouchut	Ferrari F430 GT2	MI	304
29	8	GT2	99	(Monaco) JMB Racing	(France) Manuel Rodrigues (France) Yvan Lebon (France) Christophe Bouchut	Ferrari 4.0 L V8	MI	304
30	9	GT2	81	(Italy) Advanced Engineering (United States) Team Seattle	(United States) Patrick Dempsey (United States) Don Kitch Jr. (United States) Joe Foster	Ferrari F430 GT2	MI	301
30	9	GT2	81	(Italy) Advanced Engineering (United States) Team Seattle	(United States) Patrick Dempsey (United States) Don Kitch Jr. (United States) Joe Foster	Ferrari 4.0 L V8	MI	301
31	3	GT1	66	(Austria) Jetalliance Racing	(Austria) Lukas Lichtner-Hoyer (Austria) Thomas Gruber (Germany) Alex Müller	Aston Martin DBR9	MI	294
31	3	GT1	66	(Austria) Jetalliance Racing	(Austria) Lukas Lichtner-Hoyer (Austria) Thomas Gruber (Germany) Alex Müller	Aston Martin 6.0 L V12	MI	294
32	10	GT2	96	(United Kingdom) Virgo Motorsport	(United Kingdom) Sean McInerney (United Kingdom) Michael McInerney (Netherlands) Michael Vergers	Ferrari F430 GT2	D	280
32	10	GT2	96	(United Kingdom) Virgo Motorsport	(United Kingdom) Sean McInerney (United Kingdom) Michael McInerney (Netherlands) Michael Vergers	Ferrari 4.0 L V8	D	280
Not Classified
33	11	GT2	75	(Hong Kong) Endurance Asia Team (France) Perspective Racing	(Hong Kong) Darryl O'Young (France) Philippe Hesnault (Bulgaria) Plamen Kralev	Porsche 997 GT3-RSR	D	186
33	11	GT2	75	(Hong Kong) Endurance Asia Team (France) Perspective Racing	(Hong Kong) Darryl O'Young (France) Philippe Hesnault (Bulgaria) Plamen Kralev	Porsche 3.8 L Flat-6	D	186
Did Not Finish
34	5	LMP2	5	(Japan) Navi Team Goh	(Japan) Seiji Ara (Japan) Keisuke Kunimoto (Germany) Sascha Maassen	Porsche RS Spyder Evo	MI	339
34	5	LMP2	5	(Japan) Navi Team Goh	(Japan) Seiji Ara (Japan) Keisuke Kunimoto (Germany) Sascha Maassen	Porsche MR6 3.4 L V8	MI	339
35	4	GT1	64	(United States) Corvette Racing	(United Kingdom) Oliver Gavin (Monaco) Olivier Beretta (Switzerland) Marcel Fässler	Chevrolet Corvette C6.R	MI	311
35	4	GT1	64	(United States) Corvette Racing	(United Kingdom) Oliver Gavin (Monaco) Olivier Beretta (Switzerland) Marcel Fässler	Chevrolet LS7.R 7.0 L V8	MI	311
36	6	LMP2	25	(United Kingdom) RML	(Brazil) Thomas Erdos (United Kingdom) Mike Newton (United States) Chris Dyson	Lola B08/86	MI	273
36	6	LMP2	25	(United Kingdom) RML	(Brazil) Thomas Erdos (United Kingdom) Mike Newton (United States) Chris Dyson	Mazda MZR-R 2.0 L Turbo I4	MI	273
37	12	GT2	87	(United Kingdom) Drayson Racing	(United Kingdom) Paul Drayson (United Kingdom) Jonny Cocker (United Kingdom) Marino Franchitti	Aston Martin V8 Vantage GT2	MI	272
37	12	GT2	87	(United Kingdom) Drayson Racing	(United Kingdom) Paul Drayson (United Kingdom) Jonny Cocker (United Kingdom) Marino Franchitti	Aston Martin 4.5 L V8	MI	272
38	13	GT2	76	(France) IMSA Performance Matmut	(France) Patrick Pilet (France) Raymond Narac (United States) Patrick Long	Porsche 997 GT3-RSR	MI	265
38	13	GT2	76	(France) IMSA Performance Matmut	(France) Patrick Pilet (France) Raymond Narac (United States) Patrick Long	Porsche 4.0 L Flat-6	MI	265
39	7	LMP2	39	(Germany) KSM	(Japan) Hideki Noda (France) Jean de Pourtales (Hong Kong) Matthew Marsh	Lola B07/46	D	261
39	7	LMP2	39	(Germany) KSM	(Japan) Hideki Noda (France) Jean de Pourtales (Hong Kong) Matthew Marsh	Mazda MZR-R 2.0 L Turbo I4	D	261
40	16	LMP1	009	(United Kingdom) Aston Martin Racing	(United Kingdom) Stuart Hall (Switzerland) Harold Primat (Netherlands) Peter Kox	Lola-Aston Martin B09/60	MI	252
40	16	LMP1	009	(United Kingdom) Aston Martin Racing	(United Kingdom) Stuart Hall (Switzerland) Harold Primat (Netherlands) Peter Kox	Aston Martin 6.0 L V12	MI	252
41	17	LMP1	10	(France) Team Oreca Matmut AIM	(Monaco) Stéphane Ortelli (Brazil) Bruno Senna (Portugal) Tiago Monteiro	Oreca 01	MI	219
41	17	LMP1	10	(France) Team Oreca Matmut AIM	(Monaco) Stéphane Ortelli (Brazil) Bruno Senna (Portugal) Tiago Monteiro	AIM YS5.5 5.5 L V10	MI	219
42	18	LMP1	17	(France) Pescarolo Sport	(France) Simon Pagenaud (France) Jean-Christophe Boullion (France) Benoît Tréluyer	Peugeot 908 HDi FAP	MI	210
42	18	LMP1	17	(France) Pescarolo Sport	(France) Simon Pagenaud (France) Jean-Christophe Boullion (France) Benoît Tréluyer	Peugeot HDi 5.5 L Turbo V12 (Diesel)	MI	210
43	8	LMP2	35	OAK Racing; Team Mazda France	(France) Matthieu Lahaye (France) Guillaume Moreau (Switzerland) Karim Ajlani	Pescarolo 01	D	208
43	8	LMP2	35	OAK Racing; Team Mazda France	(France) Matthieu Lahaye (France) Guillaume Moreau (Switzerland) Karim Ajlani	Mazda MZR-R 2.0 L I4	D	208
44	9	LMP2	30	(Italy) Racing Box	(Italy) Andrea Piccini (Italy) Thomas Biagi (Italy) Matteo Bobbi	Lola B08/80	MI	203
44	9	LMP2	30	(Italy) Racing Box	(Italy) Andrea Piccini (Italy) Thomas Biagi (Italy) Matteo Bobbi	Judd DB 3.4 L V8	MI	203
45	14	GT2	80	(United States) Flying Lizard Motorsports	(Germany) Jörg Bergmeister (United States) Darren Law (United States) Seth Neiman	Porsche 997 GT3-RSR	MI	194
45	14	GT2	80	(United States) Flying Lizard Motorsports	(Germany) Jörg Bergmeister (United States) Darren Law (United States) Seth Neiman	Porsche 4.0 L Flat-6	MI	194
46	15	GT2	89	(Germany) Hankook Team Farnbacher	(Germany) Dominik Farnbacher (Denmark) Allan Simonsen (San Marino) Christian Montanari	Ferrari F430 GT2	HK	183
46	15	GT2	89	(Germany) Hankook Team Farnbacher	(Germany) Dominik Farnbacher (Denmark) Allan Simonsen (San Marino) Christian Montanari	Ferrari 4.0 L V8	HK	183
47	19	LMP1	6	(United Kingdom) Team LNT	(United Kingdom) Lawrence Tomlinson (United Kingdom) Richard Dean (United Kingdom) Nigel Moore	Ginetta-Zytek GZ09S	MI	178
47	19	LMP1	6	(United Kingdom) Team LNT	(United Kingdom) Lawrence Tomlinson (United Kingdom) Richard Dean (United Kingdom) Nigel Moore	Zytek ZG408 4.0 L V8	MI	178
48	20	LMP1	2	(Germany) Audi Sport North America	(Germany) Marco Werner (Germany) Lucas Luhr (Germany) Mike Rockenfeller	Audi R15 TDI	MI	104
48	20	LMP1	2	(Germany) Audi Sport North America	(Germany) Marco Werner (Germany) Lucas Luhr (Germany) Mike Rockenfeller	Audi TDI 5.5 L Turbo V10 (Diesel)	MI	104
49	10	LMP2	41	(Switzerland) GAC Racing Team	(Saudi Arabia) Karim Ojjeh (France) Claude-Yves Gosselin (Austria) Philipp Peter	Zytek 07S/2	MI	102
49	10	LMP2	41	(Switzerland) GAC Racing Team	(Saudi Arabia) Karim Ojjeh (France) Claude-Yves Gosselin (Austria) Philipp Peter	Zytek ZG348 3.4 L V8	MI	102
50	16	GT2	70	(France) IMSA Performance Matmut (Germany) Team Felbermayr-Proton	(France) Michel Lecourt (Austria) Horst Felbermayr (Austria) Horst Felbermayr Jr.	Porsche 997 GT3-RSR	MI	102
50	16	GT2	70	(France) IMSA Performance Matmut (Germany) Team Felbermayr-Proton	(France) Michel Lecourt (Austria) Horst Felbermayr (Austria) Horst Felbermayr Jr.	Porsche 4.0 L Flat-6	MI	102
51	5	GT1	72	(France) Luc Alphand Aventures	(France) Luc Alphand (France) Stéphan Grégoire (France) Patrice Goueslard	Chevrolet Corvette C6.R	D	99
51	5	GT1	72	(France) Luc Alphand Aventures	(France) Luc Alphand (France) Stéphan Grégoire (France) Patrice Goueslard	Chevrolet LS7.R 7.0 L V8	D	99
52	11	LMP2	26	(United Kingdom) Bruichladdich-Bruneau Team	(France) Pierre Bruneau (France) Marc Rostan (United Kingdom) Tim Greaves	Radical SR9	D	91
52	11	LMP2	26	(United Kingdom) Bruichladdich-Bruneau Team	(France) Pierre Bruneau (France) Marc Rostan (United Kingdom) Tim Greaves	AER P07 2.0 L Turbo I4	D	91
53	12	LMP2	40	(Portugal) Quifel ASM Team	(Portugal) Miguel Amaral (France) Olivier Pla (United Kingdom) Guy Smith	Ginetta-Zytek GZ09S/2	D	46
53	12	LMP2	40	(Portugal) Quifel ASM Team	(Portugal) Miguel Amaral (France) Olivier Pla (United Kingdom) Guy Smith	Zytek ZG348 3.4 L V8	D	46
54	17	GT2	77	(Germany) Team Felbermayr-Proton	(Germany) Marc Lieb (Germany) Wolf Henzler (Austria) Richard Lietz	Porsche 997 GT3-RSR	MI	24
54	17	GT2	77	(Germany) Team Felbermayr-Proton	(Germany) Marc Lieb (Germany) Wolf Henzler (Austria) Richard Lietz	Porsche 4.0 L Flat-6	MI	24
55	6	GT1	68	(Japan) JLOC	(Japan) Atsushi Yogo (Japan) Yutaka Yamagishi (Italy) Marco Apicella	Lamborghini Murciélago R-GT	Y	1
55	6	GT1	68	(Japan) JLOC	(Japan) Atsushi Yogo (Japan) Yutaka Yamagishi (Italy) Marco Apicella	Lamborghini 6.0 L V12	Y	1

=== Statistics ===
- Fastest Lap – #7 Peugeot 908 HDi FAP – 3:24.352
- Best speed – Peugeot 908 HDi FAP – 341 km/h
- Distance – 5206.28 km

== Peugeot protest ==
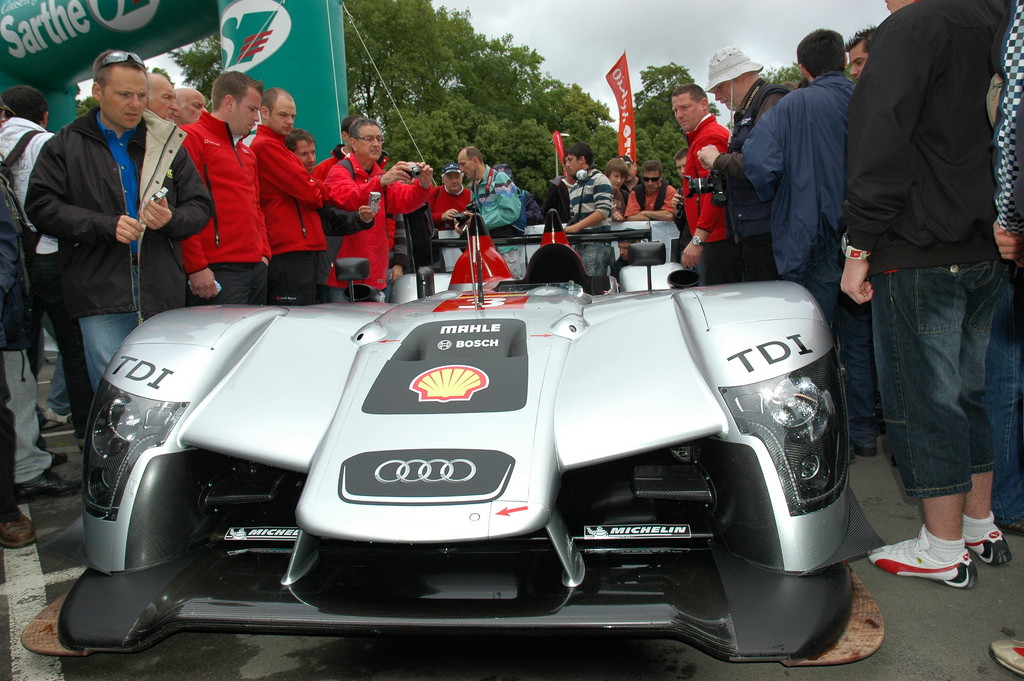
An Audi R15 TDI during scrutineering. Michelin decals are placed on one of the protested aerodynamic elements.

On Monday, 8 June, following scrutineering and approval of the Audi R15 TDI by the ACO, Peugeot Sport director Olivier Quesnel stated that the team may file a protest over the legality of certain elements of the R15 TDI's design. This protest was officially filed two days later, immediately before the start of practice. Peugeot believes that the R15 features aerodynamic elements on the front of the car which violate the ACO's regulations about devices which may increase the amount of front downforce. Peugeot, as well as fellow competitors Aston Martin Racing and Oreca, initially questioned these aerodynamic elements at the 2009 12 Hours of Sebring in March, but were assured that the ACO would evaluate them prior to Le Mans.

Later that night, Peugeot received a response from the ACO stating that it would not uphold the protest. The ACO stated that they have the ability through their own regulations to determine if an aerodynamic element's sole purpose is to create downforce. Peugeot responded within an hour by appealing this decision. A decision on this appeal however would not be made until after the race had taken place, thus allowing Audi to continue to compete. Audi stated that they believed the matter was between Peugeot and the ACO, and that their car was legal.

Following the race, Peugeot announced that they were withdrawing their appeal of the scrutineer's decision. Peugeot cited a planned increase in communication between manufacturers and the ACO as their reasoning for the withdrawal.
