= 2009 Petit Le Mans =

Sportscar endurance race in Georgia, US

The Track map of Road Atlanta

The 2009 Petit Le Mans powered by Mazda6 was the twelfth running of the Petit Le Mans and the ninth round of the 2009 American Le Mans Series season. It took place at the Road Atlanta circuit in Braselton, Georgia, on September 26, 2009. Originally scheduled to run for a distance of 1,000 miles (1,600 km) or a time of ten hours, the race was stopped after four hours due to heavy rains. The race was not restarted and the results were determined from the final lap prior to the stoppage.

When race officials decided to not restart the event Nicolas Minassian and Stéphane Sarrazin of the #08 Peugeot were declared the winners, leading their team car #07. Audi, who had won this race every year since 2000, finished in third and fourth places. This race was the first time Audi lost at Petit Le Mans since its first run since 2000. This was also the first time that neither of the Volkswagen Group marques (Audi and Porsche) won (or finished in the top two, in all cases) its classes. In the LMP2 category Dyson Racing Team won their second race of the season with the #20 Lola-Mazda of Marino Franchitti, Ben Devlin, and Butch Leitzinger ranking 13th overall and 29 laps ahead of their nearest class competitor. The GT2 category was won by Risi Competizione Ferrari leading the Rahal Letterman Racing BMW and Farnbacher-Loles Porsche on the podium.

During Thursday practice on September 24, which took place in dry, sunny conditions, Scott Sharp had a violent crash in the Acura ARX-02a exiting turn one after making contact with the Farnbacher-Loles Porsche entry, which was leaving the pits. Sharp's car turned on its left side, hit the fence, then barrel-rolled three-and-a-half times before landing right-side up. Sharp walked away from the incident. On Friday, September 25, at 9:30 AM Eastern Daylight Time, a new tub arrived from the Honda Performance Development Center in Los Angeles. The Highcroft Racing team then spent the next 24 hours rebuilding the car, getting some assistance from archrival de Ferran Motorsports. The team only used 10 percent of the parts from the original car, and were forced to start the race from pit road.

== Report ==
=== Qualifying ===
==== Qualifying result ====
Pole position winners in each class are marked in bold.

Pos	Class	Team	Qualifying Driver	Lap Time
1	**LMP1**	**#07 Team Peugeot Total**	**Nicolas Minassian**	**1:06.937**
2	LMP1	#08 Team Peugeot Total	Franck Montagny	1:07.160
3	LMP1	#2 Audi Sport Team Joest	Rinaldo Capello	1:08.200
4	LMP1	#1 Audi Sport North America	Lucas Luhr	1:08.228
5	LMP1	#66 de Ferran Motorsports	Simon Pagenaud	1:08.348
6	LMP1	#7 Team Oreca Matmut AIM	Nicolas Lapierre	1:09.566
7	LMP1	#37 Intersport Racing	Jon Field	1:09.685
8	**LMP2**	**#20 Dyson Racing Team**	**Marino Franchitti**	**1:10.152**
9	LMP1	#88 Drayson Racing	Jonny Cocker	1:10.552
10	LMP2	#6 Team Cytosport	Klaus Graf	1:11.405
11	LMP2	#15 Lowe's Fernández Racing	Adrian Fernández	1:11.758
12	LMP1	#12 Autocon Motorsports	Chris McMurry	1:12.676
13	**GT2**	**#40 Robertson Racing**	**David Murry**	**1:20.819**
14	GT2	#28 LG Motorsports	Tom Sutherland	1:20.877
15	GT2	#4 Corvette Racing	Olivier Beretta	1:20.912
16	GT2	#92 BMW Rahal Letterman Racing	Dirk Müller	1:20.981
17	GT2	#90 BMW Rahal Letterman Racing	Joey Hand	1:21.219
18	GT2	#45 Flying Lizard Motorsports	Patrick Long	1:21.299
19	GT2	#3 Corvette Racing	Johnny O'Connell	1:21.491
20	GT2	#21 Panoz Team PTG	Dominik Farnbacher	1:21.648
21	GT2	#87 Farnbacher-Loles Racing	Wolf Henzler	1:21.760
22	GT2	#62 Risi Competizione	Jaime Melo	1:22.718
23	GT2	#17 Team Falken Tires	Bryan Sellers	1:23.081
24	GT2	#11 Primetime Race Group	Chris Hall	1:23.121
25	GT2	#44 Flying Lizard Motorsports	Seth Neiman	1:25.601
–	LMP1	#9 Patrón Highcroft Racing	Did Not Participate	
–	LMP1	#10 ECO Racing	Did Not Participate	
–	UNC	#16 Dyson Racing Team	Did Not Participate	
–	LMP2	#19 van der Steur Racing	Did Not Participate	

=== Race ===
==== Race result ====
Class winners are marked in bold. Cars failing to complete 70% of winner's distance are marked as Not Classified (NC).

Pos	Class	No	Team	Drivers	Chassis	Tire	Laps
Pos	Class	No	Team	Drivers	Engine	Tire	Laps
1	**LMP1**	**08**	**(France) Team Peugeot Total**	**(France) Franck Montagny (France) Stéphane Sarrazin**	**Peugeot 908 HDi FAP**	M	**184**
1	**LMP1**	**08**	**(France) Team Peugeot Total**	**(France) Franck Montagny (France) Stéphane Sarrazin**	**Peugeot HDi 5.5 L Turbo V12 (Diesel)**	M	**184**
2	LMP1	07	(France) Team Peugeot Total	(France) Nicolas Minassian (Portugal) Pedro Lamy	Peugeot 908 HDi FAP	M	184
2	LMP1	07	(France) Team Peugeot Total	(France) Nicolas Minassian (Portugal) Pedro Lamy	Peugeot HDi 5.5 L Turbo V12 (Diesel)	M	184
3	LMP1	2	(Germany) Audi Sport Team Joest	(United Kingdom) Allan McNish (Italy) Rinaldo Capello	Audi R15 TDI	M	184
3	LMP1	2	(Germany) Audi Sport Team Joest	(United Kingdom) Allan McNish (Italy) Rinaldo Capello	Audi TDI 5.5 L Turbo V10 (Diesel)	M	184
4	LMP1	1	(Germany) Audi Sport North America	(Germany) Marco Werner (Germany) Lucas Luhr	Audi R15 TDI	M	183
4	LMP1	1	(Germany) Audi Sport North America	(Germany) Marco Werner (Germany) Lucas Luhr	Audi TDI 5.5 L Turbo V10 (Diesel)	M	183
5	LMP1	7	(France) Team Oreca Matmut AIM	(France) Nicolas Lapierre (France) Olivier Panis (France) Romain Dumas	Oreca 01	M	181
5	LMP1	7	(France) Team Oreca Matmut AIM	(France) Nicolas Lapierre (France) Olivier Panis (France) Romain Dumas	AIM YS5.5 5.5 L V10	M	181
6	LMP1	9	(United States) Patrón Highcroft Racing	(Australia) David Brabham (United States) Scott Sharp (United Kingdom) Dario Franchitti	Acura ARX-02a	M	180
6	LMP1	9	(United States) Patrón Highcroft Racing	(Australia) David Brabham (United States) Scott Sharp (United Kingdom) Dario Franchitti	Acura AR7 4.0 L V8	M	180
7	UNC	16	(United States) Dyson Racing Team	(United States) Chris Dyson (United Kingdom) Guy Smith	Lola B09/86	M	177
7	UNC	16	(United States) Dyson Racing Team	(United States) Chris Dyson (United Kingdom) Guy Smith	Mazda MZR-R 2.0 L Turbo I4 (Butanol)	M	177
8	**GT2**	**62**	**(United States) Risi Competizione**	**(Brazil) Jaime Melo (Germany) Pierre Kaffer (Finland) Mika Salo**	**Ferrari F430GT**	M	**170**
8	**GT2**	**62**	**(United States) Risi Competizione**	**(Brazil) Jaime Melo (Germany) Pierre Kaffer (Finland) Mika Salo**	**Ferrari F136 4.0 L V8**	M	**170**
9	GT2	92	(United States) BMW Rahal Letterman Racing	(United States) Tommy Milner (Germany) Dirk Müller (Germany) Jörg Müller	BMW M3 GT2	D	169
9	GT2	92	(United States) BMW Rahal Letterman Racing	(United States) Tommy Milner (Germany) Dirk Müller (Germany) Jörg Müller	BMW S65 4.0 L V8	D	169
10	GT2	87	(United States) Farnbacher-Loles Motorsports	(Germany) Wolf Henzler (Germany) Dirk Werner	Porsche 997 GT3-RSR	M	169
10	GT2	87	(United States) Farnbacher-Loles Motorsports	(Germany) Wolf Henzler (Germany) Dirk Werner	Porsche M97/74 4.0 L Flat-6	M	169
11	GT2	4	(United States) Corvette Racing	(United Kingdom) Oliver Gavin (Monaco) Olivier Beretta (Switzerland) Marcel Fässler	Chevrolet Corvette C6.R	M	169
11	GT2	4	(United States) Corvette Racing	(United Kingdom) Oliver Gavin (Monaco) Olivier Beretta (Switzerland) Marcel Fässler	Chevrolet 6.0 L V8	M	169
12	GT2	45	(United States) Flying Lizard Motorsports	(United States) Patrick Long (Germany) Jörg Bergmeister (Germany) Marc Lieb	Porsche 997 GT3-RSR	M	169
12	GT2	45	(United States) Flying Lizard Motorsports	(United States) Patrick Long (Germany) Jörg Bergmeister (Germany) Marc Lieb	Porsche M97/74 4.0 L Flat-6	M	169
13	**LMP2**	**20**	**(United States) Dyson Racing Team**	**(United States) Butch Leitzinger (United Kingdom) Marino Franchitti (United Kingdom) Ben Devlin**	**Lola B08/86**	M	**168**
13	**LMP2**	**20**	**(United States) Dyson Racing Team**	**(United States) Butch Leitzinger (United Kingdom) Marino Franchitti (United Kingdom) Ben Devlin**	**Mazda MZR-R 2.0 L Turbo I4**	M	**168**
14	GT2	3	(United States) Corvette Racing	(United States) Johnny O'Connell (Denmark) Jan Magnussen (Spain) Antonio García	Chevrolet Corvette C6.R	M	168
14	GT2	3	(United States) Corvette Racing	(United States) Johnny O'Connell (Denmark) Jan Magnussen (Spain) Antonio García	Chevrolet 6.0 L V8	M	168
15	GT2	44	(United States) Flying Lizard Motorsports	(United States) Darren Law (United States) Seth Neiman (United States) Johannes van Overbeek	Porsche 997 GT3-RSR	M	162
15	GT2	44	(United States) Flying Lizard Motorsports	(United States) Darren Law (United States) Seth Neiman (United States) Johannes van Overbeek	Porsche M97/74 4.0 L Flat-6	M	162
16	GT2	28	(United States) LG Motorsports	(United States) Tom Sutherland (United States) Tomy Drissi (United States) Matt Bell	Chevrolet Corvette C6	D	157
16	GT2	28	(United States) LG Motorsports	(United States) Tom Sutherland (United States) Tomy Drissi (United States) Matt Bell	Chevrolet LS3 6.3 L V8	D	157
17 DNF	LMP1	37	(United States) Intersport Racing	(United States) Jon Field (United States) Clint Field	Lola B06/10	D	152
17 DNF	LMP1	37	(United States) Intersport Racing	(United States) Jon Field (United States) Clint Field	AER P32C 4.0 L Turbo V8	D	152
18	GT2	21	(United States) Panoz Team PTG	Ian James (Germany) Dominik Farnbacher	Panoz Esperante GT-LM	Y	152
18	GT2	21	(United States) Panoz Team PTG	Ian James (Germany) Dominik Farnbacher	Ford (Élan) 5.0 L V8	Y	152
19 DNF	LMP1	12	(United States) Autocon Motorsports	(United States) Bryan Willman (United States) Chris McMurry (Canada) Tony Burgess	Lola B06/10	D	144
19 DNF	LMP1	12	(United States) Autocon Motorsports	(United States) Bryan Willman (United States) Chris McMurry (Canada) Tony Burgess	AER P32C 4.0 L Turbo V8	D	144
20	GT2	40	(United States) Robertson Racing	(United States) David Robertson (United States) Andrea Robertson (United States) David Murry	Ford GT-R Mk. VII	D	142
20	GT2	40	(United States) Robertson Racing	(United States) David Robertson (United States) Andrea Robertson (United States) David Murry	Ford 5.0 L V8	D	142
21	LMP2	15	(Mexico) Lowe's Fernández Racing	(Mexico) Adrian Fernández (Mexico) Luis Díaz	Acura ARX-01B	M	139
21	LMP2	15	(Mexico) Lowe's Fernández Racing	(Mexico) Adrian Fernández (Mexico) Luis Díaz	Acura AL7R 3.4 L V8	M	139
22	LMP2	6	(United States) Team Cytosport	(United States) Greg Pickett (Germany) Klaus Graf (Germany) Sascha Maassen	Porsche RS Spyder Evo	M	136
22	LMP2	6	(United States) Team Cytosport	(United States) Greg Pickett (Germany) Klaus Graf (Germany) Sascha Maassen	Porsche MR6 3.4 L V8	M	136
23	GT2	17	(United States) Team Falken Tire	(United States) Bryan Sellers (United States) Dominic Cicero	Porsche 997 GT3-RSR	F	136
23	GT2	17	(United States) Team Falken Tire	(United States) Bryan Sellers (United States) Dominic Cicero	Porsche M97/74 4.0 L Flat-6	F	136
24	LMP1	66	(United States) de Ferran Motorsports	(Brazil) Gil de Ferran (France) Simon Pagenaud (New Zealand) Scott Dixon	Acura ARX-02a	M	136
24	LMP1	66	(United States) de Ferran Motorsports	(Brazil) Gil de Ferran (France) Simon Pagenaud (New Zealand) Scott Dixon	Acura AR7 4.0 L V8	M	136
25	GT2	90	(United States) BMW Rahal Letterman Racing	(United States) Bill Auberlen (United States) Joey Hand (United Kingdom) Andy Priaulx	BMW M3 GT2	D	133
25	GT2	90	(United States) BMW Rahal Letterman Racing	(United States) Bill Auberlen (United States) Joey Hand (United Kingdom) Andy Priaulx	BMW S65 4.0 L V8	D	133
26 DNF	GT2	11	(United States) Primetime Race Group	(United States) Joel Feinberg (United Kingdom) Chris Hall	Dodge Viper Competition Coupe	Y	129
26 DNF	GT2	11	(United States) Primetime Race Group	(United States) Joel Feinberg (United Kingdom) Chris Hall	Dodge Viper 8.3 L V10	Y	129
27 NC	LMP1	88	(United Kingdom) Drayson Racing	(United Kingdom) Paul Drayson (United Kingdom) Jonny Cocker (United Kingdom) Rob Bell	Lola B09/60	M	123
27 NC	LMP1	88	(United Kingdom) Drayson Racing	(United Kingdom) Paul Drayson (United Kingdom) Jonny Cocker (United Kingdom) Rob Bell	Judd GV5.5 S2 5.5 L V10	M	123
DNS	LMP1	10	(United Kingdom) ECO Racing	(Japan) Hideki Noda (Argentina) José Manuel Balbiani (South Africa) Dion von Moltke	Radical SR9	D	–
DNS	LMP1	10	(United Kingdom) ECO Racing	(Japan) Hideki Noda (Argentina) José Manuel Balbiani (South Africa) Dion von Moltke	ECO (AER) 5.0 L Turbo V10 (Diesel)	D	–
DNS	LMP2	19	(United States) van der Steur Racing	(United States) Gunnar van der Steur (United States) Adam Pecorari (United States) Robbie Pecorari	Radical SR9	K	–
DNS	LMP2	19	(United States) van der Steur Racing	(United States) Gunnar van der Steur (United States) Adam Pecorari (United States) Robbie Pecorari	AER P07 2.0 L Turbo I4	K	–

American Le Mans Series
Previous race: 2009 Grand Prix of Mosport	2009 season	Next race: 2009 Monterey Sports Car Championships
