= Audi R15 TDI =

Endurance race car

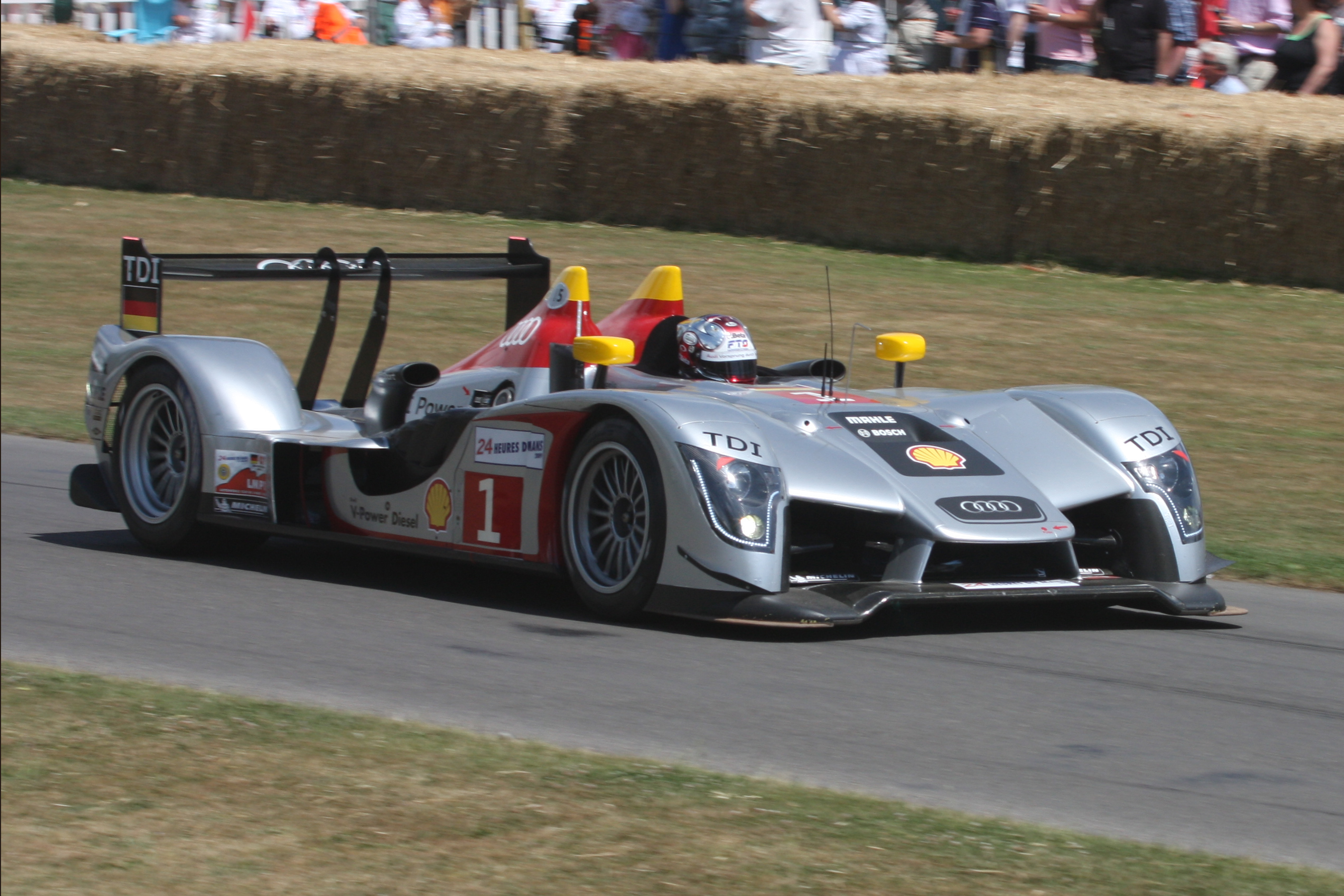
- Audi R15 TDI at the 2009 Goodwood Festival of Speed
- Category: LMP1
- Constructor: Audi (Dallara)
- Designers: Ralf Jüttner (technical director); Ulrich Baretzky (Head of Engine Development)
- Predecessor: Audi R10 TDI
- Successor: Audi R18

Technical specifications
- Chassis: Carbon fibre monocoque
- Suspension (front): Double wishbone, torsion bar with separate damper, anti-roll bar
- Suspension (rear): Double wishbone, torsion bar with separate damper, anti-roll bar
- Length: 4,650 mm (183.1 in)
- Width: 2,000 mm (78.7 in)
- Height: 1,030 mm (40.6 in)
- Wheelbase: approx. 290–300 cm (114–118 in) (estimated)
- Engine: Audi TDI 5.5 litre 90° V10 turbodiesel, mid-engined, longitudinally mounted
- Transmission: X-trac 5-speed S-tronic
- Weight: min. 900 kg (1,984 lb) in 2009, min. 930 kg (2,050 lb) in 2010
- Fuel: Shell V-Power Diesel later BP Ultimate Diesel
- Tyres: Michelin Radial, front: 33/68-18, rear: 37/71-18

Competition history
- Notable entrants: (Germany) Audi Sport Team Joest
- Notable drivers: (Denmark) Tom Kristensen (United Kingdom) Allan McNish (Italy) Rinaldo Capello (Germany) Marco Werner (Germany) Lucas Luhr (Germany) Mike Rockenfeller (Germany) Timo Bernhard (France) Romain Dumas (France) Alexandre Prémat (Germany) André Lotterer (Switzerland) Marcel Fässler (France) Benoît Tréluyer
- Debut: 2009 12 Hours of Sebring
Races	Wins	Poles	F/Laps
10	3	1	2
- Constructors' Championships: 0
- Drivers' Championships: 0

2009 Audi R15 TDI

2010 Audi R15 TDI plus

The Audi R15 TDI, commonly abbreviated to the R15, is a Le Mans Prototype (LMP) racing car constructed by the German car manufacturer Audi AG. It is the successor to the Audi R10 TDI.

Like its predecessor, the R15 TDI uses a turbocharged diesel engine, although the R15's V10 engine is physically smaller than the R10's V12. The smaller engine is pushed further toward the middle of the car than in the R10, resulting in a more neutral weight balance that gives the car better agility around the corners than its predecessor.

== History ==
=== 2009 ===
The car was tested for the first time in December 2008 and made its competition debut at the 2009 12 Hours of Sebring race, 21 March 2009. The R15 got off to a perfect start by winning the 12 Hours of Sebring, setting a new race record in the process.

Three R15 TDIs participated in the 24 Hours of Le Mans in June 2009, under the control of Joest Racing. Peugeot, its rival, with its 908 HDi FAP, took the top two spots in the 24-hour race, ending Audi's five-win streak that lasted back to 2004 with the gasoline-powered R8.

Audi did not defend their American Le Mans Series, or Le Mans Series titles with the R15 TDI.

The R15 TDI features a 5.5 litres (336 cu in) Turbocharged Direct Injection (TDI) turbodiesel V10 engine, rated at over 440 kW; 590 bhp (600 PS) and 1,050 N⋅m (774 lbf⋅ft) of torque. The electrical system uses a lithium-ion battery, a first for Audi sports prototypes, as well as LED headlights and a unique system of LED rear lights that are mounted on the rear wing endplate.

In the week leading up to the 2009 24 Hours of Le Mans, rival Peugeot lodged a protest against the R15, claiming that its bodywork did not comply with regulations stating that parts of the bodywork cannot be fitted with the sole purpose of generating downforce. However, after the Wednesday free practice session, the ACO rejected Peugeot's protest. At the 2009 Le Mans, Audi was unable to continue its winning streak that dated back to 2004. The No. 3 R15 ran off at Indianapolis Corner at the beginning of the race but eventually finished 17th. The No. 2, driven by Luhr, crashed and retired. In the evening, the No. 1 Audi lost a lap to the leading Peugeot, which was faster, and further technical issues dropped it a full 7 laps down the order. The No. 1 Audi clinched a podium finish, finishing in third place.

Audi announced on 25 August 2009, that two R15s would race at the 2009 Petit Le Mans. Both Audis led for approximately 90% of the race, but a late spin during the final rain-soaked caution handed the victory to one of the Peugeot 908 HDi FAPs entered by Team Peugeot Total. This loss was Audi's first since competing in Petit Le Mans since their initial attempt at Road Atlanta back in 2000.

== R15 TDI Plus (2010) ==
In response to losing the 24 Hours of Le Mans and the Petit Le Mans to the Peugeot 908s, Audi updated their R15 for the 2010 season, creating the R15 Plus. 2010 regulations reduced the size of diesel LMP1 air restrictors and turbocharger boost pressure. However, despite this, Audi's engineering team, led by Ulrich Baretzky, was able to achieve engine power and performance that was comparable to the 2009 powerplant. Aerodynamic efficiency was also a major area of focus in 2010. The frontal area of the car was redesigned to reveal the raw crash structures. The front fenders were also lowered in an effort to reduce drag, while the concept of air running through the car was abandoned for a more conventional design. The air channel that exited to the side of the car was redesigned, resulting in a more conventional configuration, and a new headlight concept was introduced. Audi stated that they had improved the fuel tank and cooling system as well.

=== Racing history ===
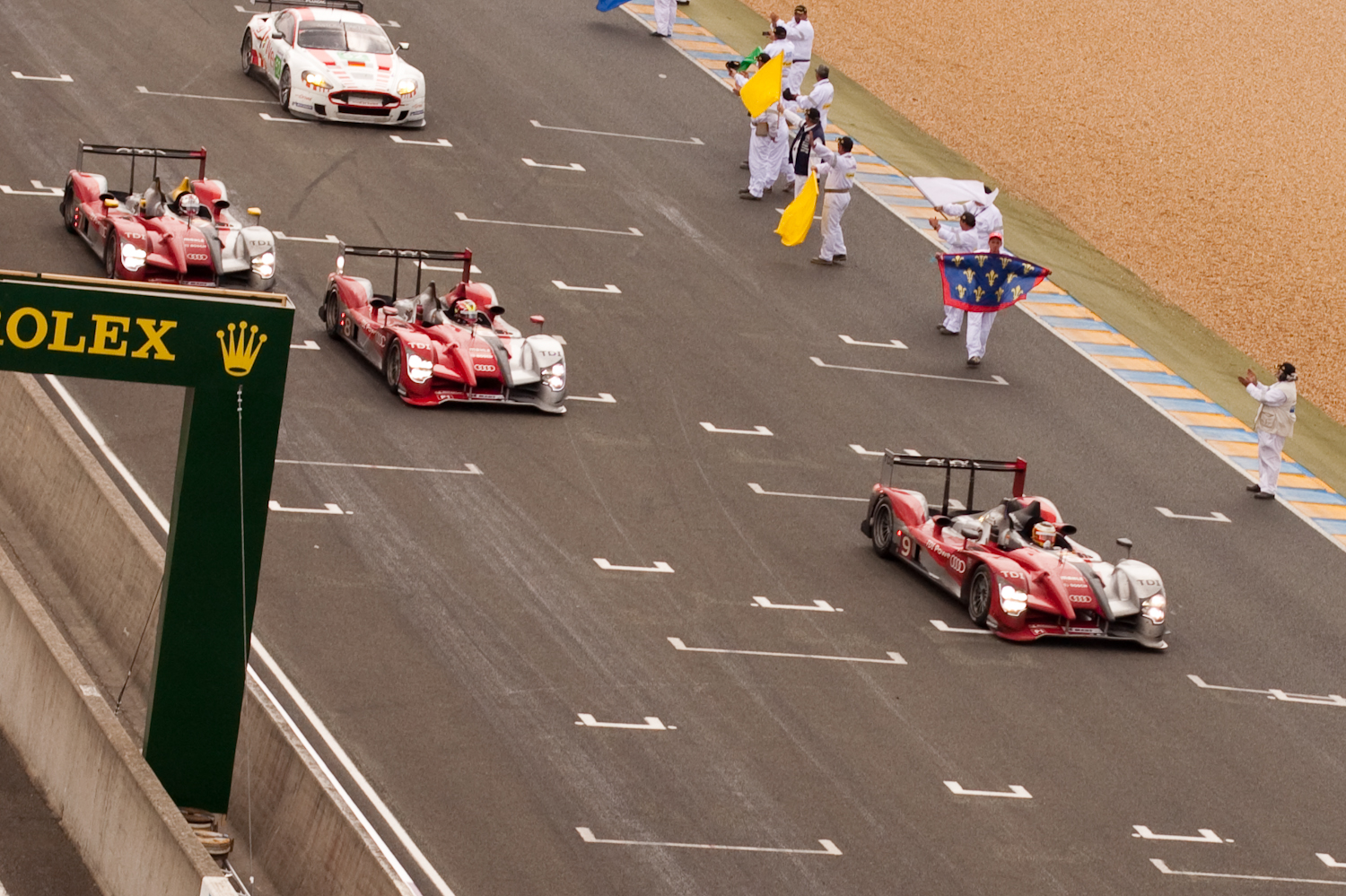
At the 2010 24 Hours of Le Mans, the three Joest Racing-entered R15s finished on the podium.

The new vehicle was a success at the 2010 8 Hours of Le Castellet, winning five laps ahead of the next competitor, Aston Martin. The Oreca Peugeot, which was supposedly its rival, dropped a full eight laps down the order because the airjacks failed to come off. Audi continued to go flat out and, in the end, finished ten laps ahead of the Peugeot. Audi had now been able to achieve both the speed and reliability combination that they considered sufficient to match the Peugeot challenge for Le Mans. A full squad of three cars was entered for the next race, which was the 2010 Spa 1000 km, finishing third (#7, behind the two Peugeots - No. 3 took first, No. 2 took second), fifth (#9), and twelfth (#8), respectively. Audi treated the race as a setup exercise for car configuration at Spa that would then be used for the 2010 24 Hours of Le Mans.

The 2010 24 Hours of Le Mans race got off to a tightly contested start, with Peugeot occupying the top spots (as they did for qualifying) and for a large part of the race. However, it was apparent throughout the race that Audi was unable to match the pace of the Peugeots and was working according to a different race strategy. By pushing the French manufacturer to the limit, three of the Peugeot cars experienced engine problems due to connecting rod failure towards the latter part of the race. With engine troubles for three of the Peugeots that forced the cars to retire before the end of the race, and an early exit by the No. 3 due to a suspension failure, the three Audis would finish 1–2–3 (the No. 9 took first, the No. 8 took second, and the No. 7 took third), with all cars exceeding the previous distance record of 5,335.313 km (3,315.210 mi) set in the 1971 race by Dr. Helmut Marko and Gijs van Lennep: the winning No. 9 car, led by Mike Rockenfeller and two Porsche factory drivers Timo Bernhard and Romain Dumas, set not only a record-tying number of laps around Le Mans of 397 laps, but eclipsed the distance record outright at a distance of 5,410.7 km (3,362.1 mi).

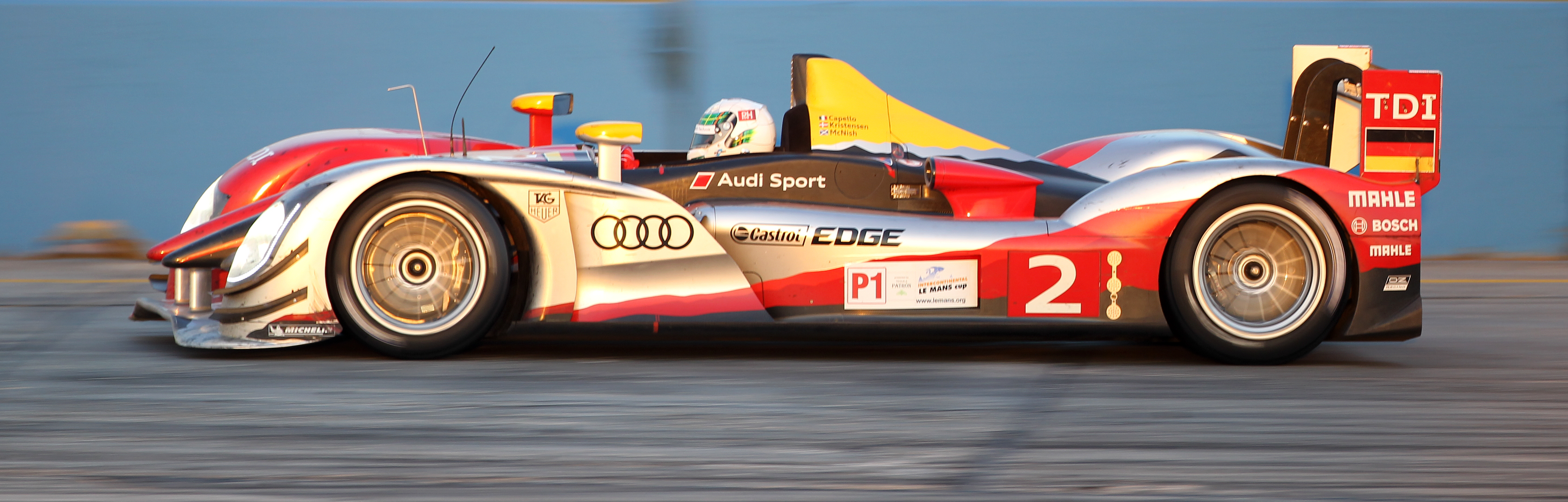
Audi R15 at Sebring 2011

Post-Le Mans Audi did not collect any more victories and lost all three remaining races to the Peugeot 908, which happened to be part of the ILMC championship. Audi fielded two cars into the Silverstone 1000 km, but the No. 7 crashed and retired. The sole remaining No. 8 finished third. At Petit Le Mans, two cars were entered, but both lost to a Peugeot 1–2 victory. At the R15's last race, two cars were entered in the Zhuhai 1000 km. Both cars were leading the 908s by thirty seconds after Sébastian Bourdais made contact with a GT2 Porsche. A late safety car session saw the Audi's lead shrink to thirteen seconds. Afterwards, controversial teamwork by Peugeot saw the No. 1 908 slow down the No. 7 Audi enough to let the No. two Peugeot come out of the pits just two seconds ahead. The race ended with Peugeot No. 2 winning four seconds ahead of the Audi. Audi did not win the LMP1 Le Mans Series team championship or the ILMC LMP1 championship.

The R15's final race was at the 2011 Sebring 12 Hours. Both cars ran in the 2010 configuration with new restrictors. The No. 1 Audi finished fifth overall after two consecutive tyre punctures and rear bodywork damage at the hands of Mike Rockenfeller. Later in the race, No. 1 had to serve a penalty for speeding in pitlane. The No. 2 ran at the front, exchanging the lead with the Peugeot until a shunt by one of the Peugeots at turn 17 put Capello out of contention with a suspension failure. The No. 2 finished fourth overall, albeit five laps down from the winning Oreca Peugeot. Throughout its career, the R15 won three of the ten races it entered; Sebring in 2009, Paul Ricard and Le Mans in 2010.

== Replacement ==
With a change in Le Mans prototype engine regulations planned for 2011, Audi developed the closed-top R18 to succeed the R15. Wolfgang Ullrich cited favourable changes to pitstop regulations and aerodynamic efficiency as the reasons for adopting a closed-cockpit design. The R18 was Audi's first-ever coupe since the failed Audi R8C in 1999, although the Bentley Speed 8, which won in 2003 with an Audi-developed engine, was also a closed-cockpit car.

The R15 TDI's final start came at the 2011 12 Hours of Sebring, where it competed as an upgraded R15++, as the R18 was still being developed at the time.

== Technical data ==
Audi R15 TDI
Design	Le Mans Prototype (LMP1)
Motor type	90° V10-Diesel motor with turbocharger
Engine displacement	5500 cc
Power	over 440 kW (590 HP)
Torque	1050 Nm (774 lb ft)
V_{max}	over 330 km/h (205 mph)
Drive wheels	Rear wheels
Gearbox	CFK-gearbox
Transmission	sequential, pneumatic actuated 5-gear
Brakes	2-circuit hydraulic braking system, carbon fibre disc brakes front and back
Length	4,650 mm (183.1 in)
Width	2,000 mm (78.7 in)
Height	1,030 mm (40.6 in)
Fuel tank capacity	81 L (21 US gal; 18 imp gal)
Weight	min. 900 kg (1,984 lb)

== Additional images ==
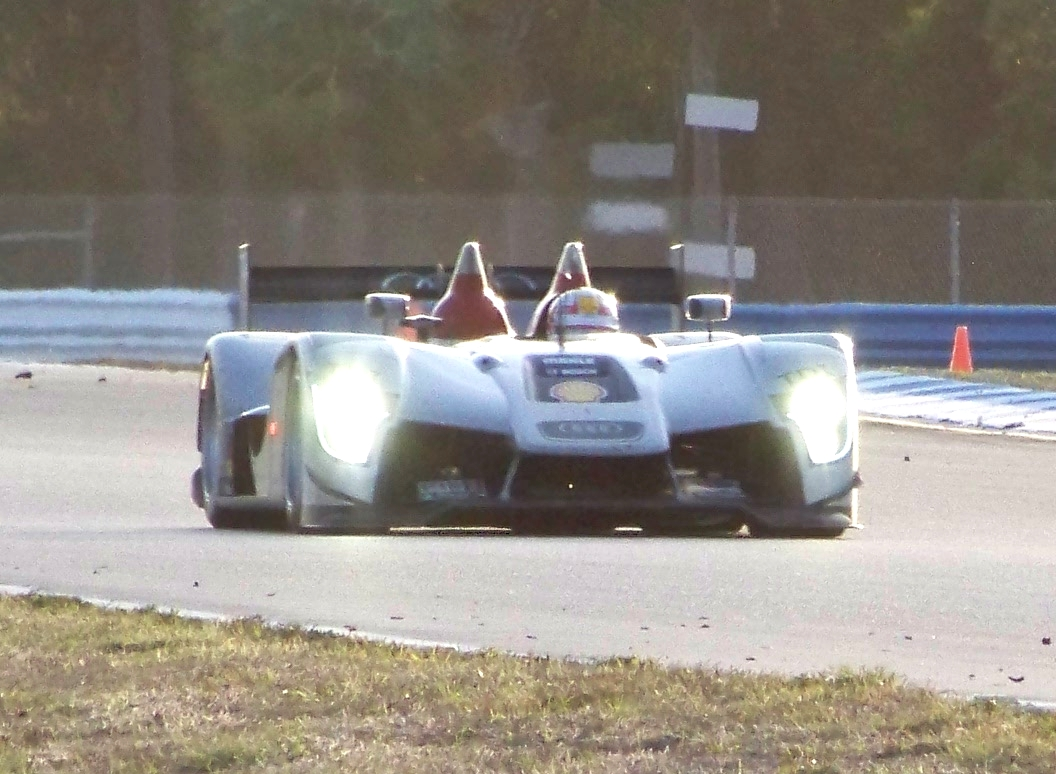
The Audi R15 TDI, driven by Tom Kristensen during the 2009 12 Hours of Sebring.

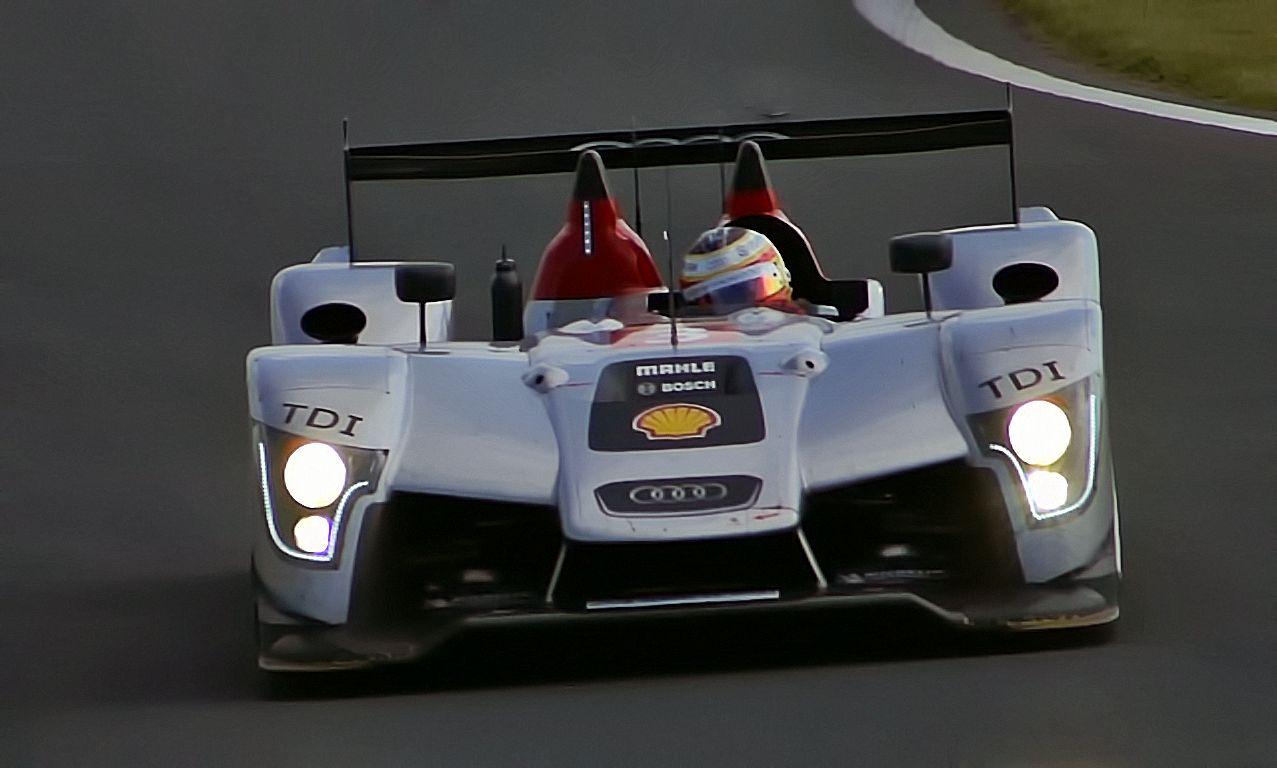
The Audi R15 TDI, driven by Timo Bernhard during the 2009 24 Hours of Le Mans.

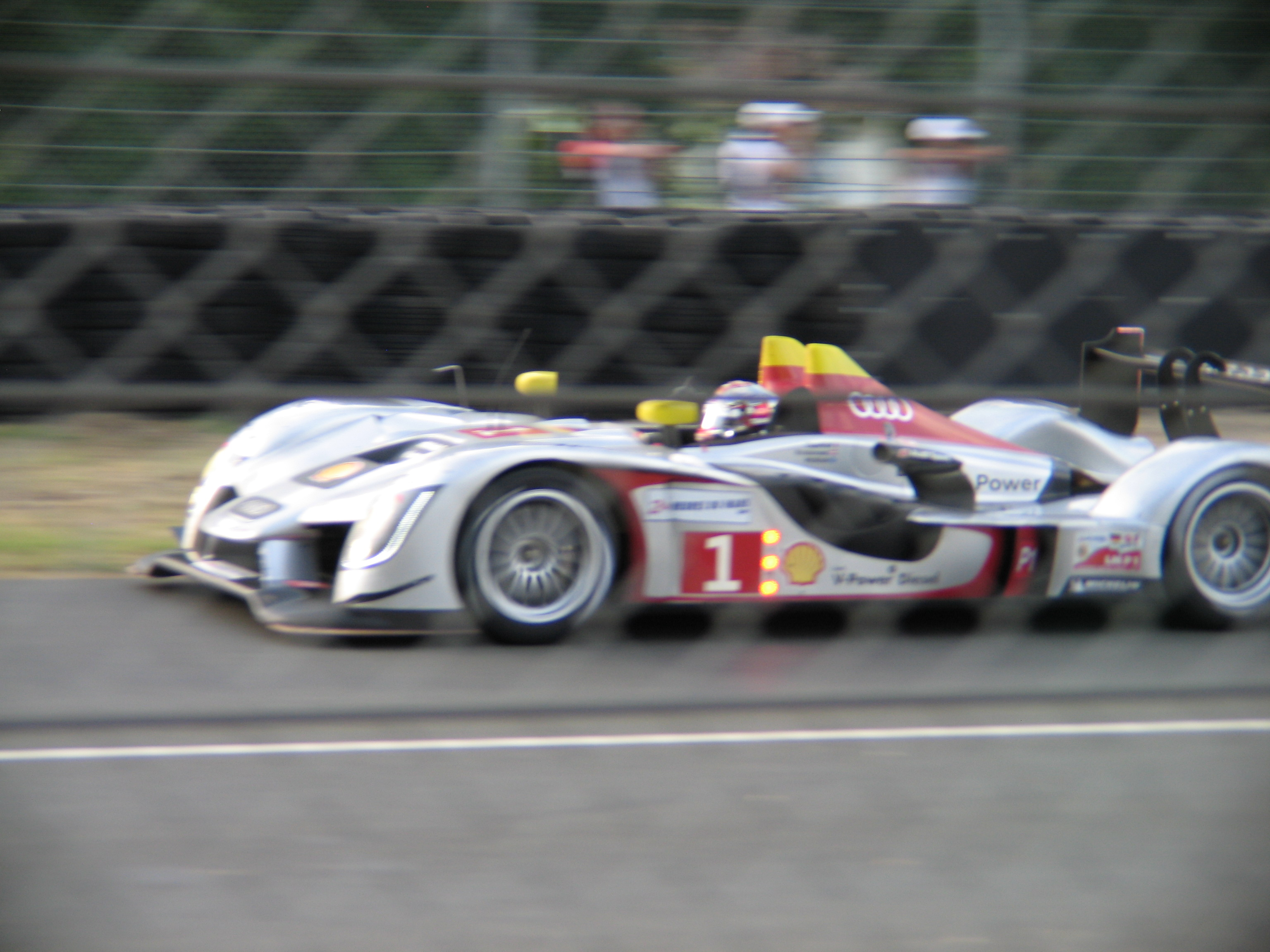
The Audi R15 TDI, driven by Rinaldo Capello during the 2009 24 Hours of Le Mans.

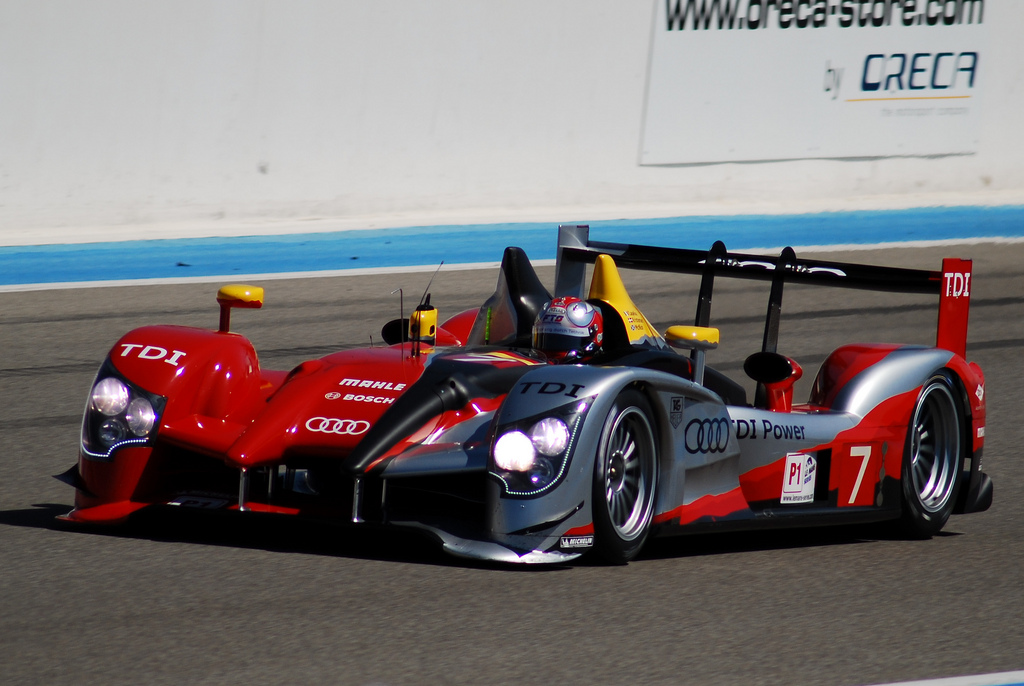
The Audi R15 TDI Plus, driven by Rinaldo Capello during the 2010 8 Hours of Castellet.

== 24 Hours of Le Mans results ==
Year	Team	Drivers	Car #	Class	Laps	Pos.	Class Pos.
2009	(Germany) Audi Sport Team Joest	(Denmark) Tom Kristensen (United Kingdom) Allan McNish (Italy) Rinaldo Capello	1	LMP1	376	3rd	3rd
2009	(Germany) Audi Sport North America	(Germany) Marco Werner (Germany) Lucas Luhr (Germany) Mike Rockenfeller	2	LMP1	104	DNF	DNF
2009	(Germany) Audi Sport Team Joest	(Germany) Timo Bernhard (France) Romain Dumas (France) Alexandre Prémat	9	LMP1	333	1st	1st
2010	(Germany) Audi Sport Team Joest	(Denmark) Tom Kristensen (United Kingdom) Allan McNish (Italy) Rinaldo Capello	7	LMP1	394	3rd	3rd
2010	(Germany) Audi Sport Team Joest	(Germany) André Lotterer (Switzerland) Marcel Fässler (France) Benoit Treluyer	8	LMP1	396	2nd	2nd
2010	(Germany) Audi Sport North America	(Germany) Mike Rockenfeller (Germany) Timo Bernhard (France) Romain Dumas	9	LMP1	397	1st	1st
