= Ulrich Baretzky =

German automobile engineer

Ulrich Baretzky was Audi Sport's Head of Engine Technology, amongst his achievements he has been credited with developing the V12, V10 and V6 TDI engine's, used in the Audi R10, Audi R15 and Audi R18 race cars. Baretzky also brought Fuel Stratified Injection to the Audi R8 (LMP).

The 25 years that the chief engine engineer has spent with Audi Sport have been gilded by a total of eleven victories at the 24-hour race on Circuit de la Sarthe, plus six titles in the Deutsche Tourenwagen Masters and a host of further successes with sports prototypes, touring cars and GT sports cars.

Baretzky retired in 2020.
