= 2009 12 Hours of Sebring =

Sports car endurance race

Track map of the Sebring International Raceway

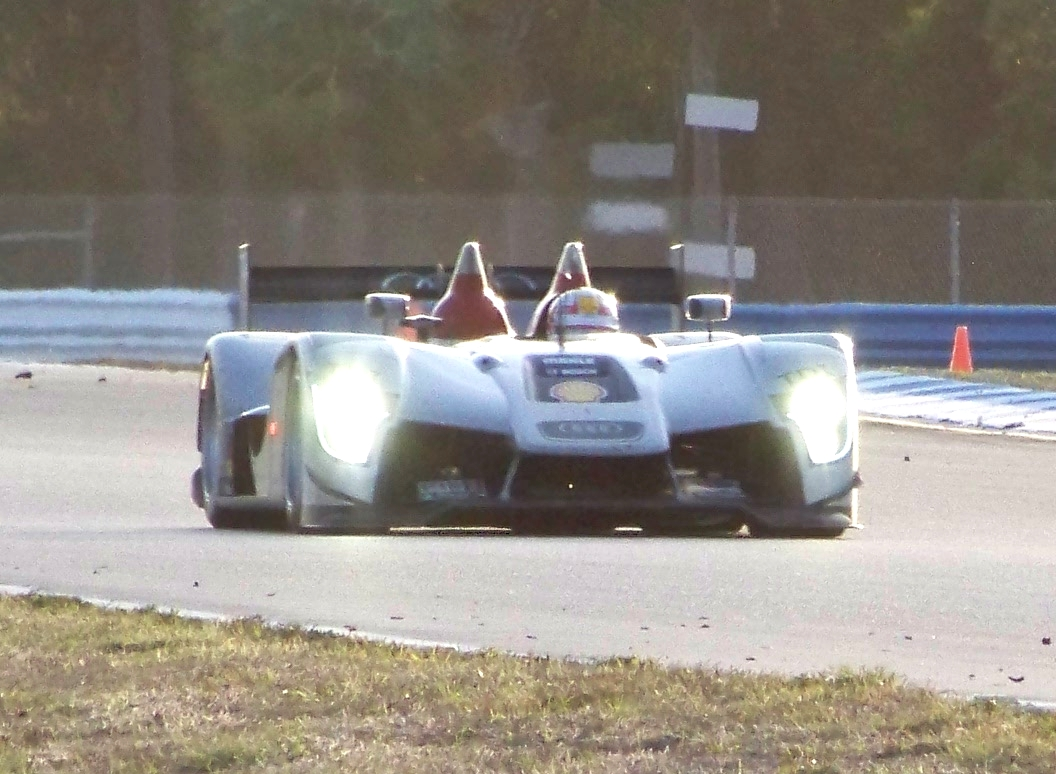
Tom Kristensen at the wheel of the winning Audi R15 TDI.

The 2009 Mobil 1 12 Hours of Sebring was the 57th running of the 12 Hours of Sebring and the opening round of the 2009 American Le Mans Series season. It took place at the Sebring International Raceway, Florida on March 21, 2009. Three new cars made their debut at Sebring: Audi's diesel R15 TDI, Acura's first LMP1 entry the ARX-02a, and the return of the BMW M3 to the GT2 category. It was also the last time GT1 category raced at the event.

Tom Kristensen, Allan McNish, and Rinaldo Capello won, Audi's ninth Sebring victory in eleven attempts, and set several event records in the process. Peugeot fell 22 seconds short of the winning Audi. While Acura's LMP1s failed to survive for twelve hours, their lone LMP2 entry was the sole finisher in the category and earned Fernández Racing their first ALMS victory. The GT1 category was fought amongst only the two Corvette Racing cars, while GT2's battle of manufacturers was won by Ferrari and the Risi Competizione team.

== Entry ==
For the start of the American Le Mans Series season, 28 cars were officially entered, with the bulk of the entries in LMP1 and GT2. The 2008 race winners, Penske Racing Porsche, did not return to defend their title. Four manufacturers were represented in LMP1, including a duo of R15 TDIs, Audi's latest diesel prototype, being entered by Joest Racing. Peugeot returned once more with their 908 HDi FAP, entering two cars compared to last year's single Sebring entry. Acura made their LMP1 debut with the new ARX-02a being run by de Ferran Motorsport and Highcroft Racing, while the remaining two entries were Lola-AERs entered by Intersport Racing and Autocon Motorsports. LMP2 consisted of two teams entering three cars, with Fernández Racing once again running an Acura and Dyson Racing partnering with Mazda for two Lola coupés.

GT1 was once again left to just Corvette Racing with two cars, while GT2 dominated the entry list with 15 cars. Porsche was represented by two cars each from Flying Lizard Motorsports and VICI Racing, as well as a single entry for Farnbacher-Loles Racing. Ferrari once again aligned with Risi Competizione for two cars, while the Italian-Argentinian Advanced Engineering PeCom team also represents the brand. BMW made their return to the series with two M3 E92s for Rahal Letterman Racing. The rest of the GT2 field was made of a mix of teams and automotive brands, including LG Motorsport's Chevrolet Corvette, PTG's Panoz, Primetime's Dodge Viper, Robertson's Ford GT, and Drayson's Aston Martin.

== Report ==
=== Qualifying ===
Held on Thursday, March 19, two 15-minute qualifying sessions were held to determine the starting grid. The two GT categories qualified in the first session, led by the two GT1 Corvettes. Only setting a few laps, the #4 Corvette of Oliver Gavin out qualified his teammate, Jan Magnussen. In GT2 Porsche locked in the first two spots on the grid, led by Dirk Werner of Farnbacher-Loles. Advanced Engineering PeCom led Ferrari with a third place spot, while Robertson Racing's Ford GT earned fifth. BMW's debut was hampered by mechanical problems for the #92 car, while the #90 of Bill Auberlen qualified seventh.

In the LMP qualifying session, Acura was able to upset both Audi and Peugeot by earning pole position in their LMP1 debut. De Ferran Motorsports' driver Scott Dixon outpaced Tom Kristensen's Audi by less than a tenth of a second, while Christian Klien led Peugeot to third. Acura earned a second pole position in the session as Fernández Racing led the LMP2 category, nearly two seconds ahead of the fastest Dyson Lola-Mazda.

After qualifying the VICI team, who had one qualifier, withdrew from the event. This decreased the starting grid to 26 cars.

==== Qualifying result ====
Pole position winners in each class are marked in bold.

Pos	Class	Team	Qualifying Driver	Lap Time
1	**LMP1**	**#66 de Ferran Motorsports**	**Scott Dixon**	**1:45.278**
2	LMP1	#2 Audi Sport Team Joest	Tom Kristensen	1:45.360
3	LMP1	#07 Team Peugeot Total	Christian Klien	1:45.462
4	LMP1	#1 Audi Sport North America	Mike Rockenfeller	1:45.551
5	LMP1	#08 Team Peugeot Total	Sébastien Bourdais	1:45.559
6	LMP1	#9 Patrón Highcroft Racing	David Brabham	1:46.504
7	**LMP2**	**#15 Lowe's Fernández Racing**	**Adrian Fernández**	**1:49.686**
8	LMP2	#16 Dyson Racing Team	Chris Dyson	1:51.534
9	LMP1	#12 Autocon Motorsports	Chris McMurry	1:51.598
10	LMP2	#20 Dyson Racing Team	Butch Leitzinger	1:51.840
11	**GT1**	**#4 Corvette Racing**	**Oliver Gavin**	**1:57.882**
12	GT1	#3 Corvette Racing	Jan Magnussen	1:58.203
13	**GT2**	**#87 Farnbacher-Loles Racing**	**Dirk Werner**	**2:03.051**
14	GT2	#45 Flying Lizard Motorsports	Jörg Bergmeister	2:03.433
15	GT2	#95 Advanced Engineering PeCom	Gianmaria Bruni	2:03.487
16	GT2	#62 Risi Competizione	Mika Salo	2:03.829
17	GT2	#40 Robertson Racing	David Murry	2:04.333
18	GT2	#21 Panoz Team PTG	Dominik Farnbacher	2:04.437
19	GT2	#90 BMW Rahal Letterman Racing	Bill Auberlen	2:04.566
20	GT2	#11 Primetime Race Group	Chris Hall	2:05.619
21	GT2	#007 Drayson Racing	Jonny Cocker	2:05.692
22	GT2	#18 VICI Racing	Nicky Pastorelli	2:05.805
23	GT2	#28 LG Motorsports	Lou Giglotti	2:06.678
24	GT2	#61 Risi Competizione/Krohn	Tracy Krohn	2:08.386
25	GT2	#44 Flying Lizard Motorsports	Darren Law	2:10.912
26	LMP1	#37 Intersport Racing	Did Not Participate	
27	GT2	#92 BMW Rahal Letterman Racing	Did Not Participate	

=== Race ===
The field crossed the starting line to begin the 12 Hours of Sebring at 10:30 am EST. Although the de Ferran Acura led from pole position, the lead of the race was quickly taken by Audi before the first turn, followed by Peugeot. The #08 Peugeot started at the tail of the field due to power steering problems forcing it to begin from pit lane. One of the two Rahal Letterman BMW's also suffered problems on the grid and had to be taken to the garage, finally starting the race nearly an hour late. An early on track incident was a collision between the #40 Robertson Ford and the #45 Flying Lizard Porsche, with the Porsche requiring extensive repairs.

During pit stops in the first few hours of the race, Audi changed their Michelin tires at every opportunity while Peugeot opted to change tires at every other pit stop. This allowed Peugeot to take the lead. The Highcroft Acura suffered a spin in the hands of David Brabham, forcing the Robertson Ford to evade the Acura and hit the wall outside Sunset Bend, bringing out the first full-course caution. A second caution was required an hour later to retrieve the Intersport Lola-AER after its engine failed while on the circuit.

While Sébastien Bourdais led the race in Peugeot #08, he suffered a spin on Sunset Bend while diminished his lead by 20 seconds, but he was able to continue. The #07 Peugeot however came to the pits for a lengthy stop to repair an air conditioning fan in the cockpit, dropping it from contention. Meanwhile, the Dyson Racing Team retired their two cars from the event, as did the remaining Rahal Letterman BMW, all due to engine failures.

A third caution period came out when David Brabham once again spun his Highcroft Acura, this time making light contact with a wall. While Peugeot still led in the eighth hour of the race, Audi began to double stint their tires for the first time when Lucas Luhr brought the third place Audi in for a scheduled stop but did not change tires. This aided Audi in retaking the lead from Peugeot during the race's ninth hour. Peugeot #08 then suffered a small leak in a rear tire, requiring the team to make an unscheduled pit stop to replace it. The two LMP1 Acuras meanwhile suffered mechanical problems, eventually leading to the retirement of both de Ferran and Highcroft.

In the closing hours, the #45 Porsche, having rebounded from its incident early in the race, was attempting to pass the PTG Panoz for third place in GT2 when the two came into contact at the exit of Sunset Bend. The Porsche, driven by Marc Lieb, was spun into the concrete wall and required extensive repairs while the Panoz continued on. In the closing hours, Peugeot and Audi traded the lead as each team made their respective pit stops. Peugeot #08 led as it came to the pits for its final stop, but Audi needed only a short refuel on their final stop several laps later. This allowed Audi driver Allan McNish to exit the pits after his final stop ahead of Peugeot with only fifteen minutes remaining. By the race finish the margin of victory between the #2 Audi and #08 Peugeot was 22 seconds.

Tom Kristensen earned his record fifth overall win. The #2 Audi covered a distance of 1,417 mi (2,280 km) at an average speed of 117.986 mph (189.880 km/h), both of which were new event records. The Lowe's Fernández Racing Acura was the sole survivor in LMP2, finishing in fourth overall, while Corvette Racing #3 outperformed its teammate in GT1. The GT2 class was won by the Ferrari of Risi Competizione, while the European Advanced Engineering PeCom Ferrari was second. Panoz completed the GT2 class podium. In the Michelin Green X Challenge, the race winning #2 Audi was the most efficient LMP, while the #3 Corvette lead GTs.

==== Race result ====
Class winners in bold. Cars failing to complete 70% of winner's distance marked as Not Classified (NC).

Pos	Class	No	Team	Drivers	Chassis	Tire	Laps
Pos	Class	No	Team	Drivers	Engine	Tire	Laps
1	**LMP1**	**2**	**(Germany) Audi Sport Team Joest**	**(United Kingdom) Allan McNish (Italy) Rinaldo Capello (Denmark) Tom Kristensen**	**Audi R15 TDI**	MI	**383**
1	**LMP1**	**2**	**(Germany) Audi Sport Team Joest**	**(United Kingdom) Allan McNish (Italy) Rinaldo Capello (Denmark) Tom Kristensen**	**Audi TDI 5.5 L Turbo V10 (Diesel)**	MI	**383**
2	LMP1	08	(France) Team Peugeot Total	(France) Franck Montagny (France) Stéphane Sarrazin (France) Sébastien Bourdais	Peugeot 908 HDi FAP	MI	383
2	LMP1	08	(France) Team Peugeot Total	(France) Franck Montagny (France) Stéphane Sarrazin (France) Sébastien Bourdais	Peugeot HDI 5.5 L Turbo V12 (Diesel)	MI	383
3	LMP1	1	(Germany) Audi Sport North America	(Germany) Mike Rockenfeller (Germany) Lucas Luhr (Germany) Marco Werner	Audi R15 TDI	MI	381
3	LMP1	1	(Germany) Audi Sport North America	(Germany) Mike Rockenfeller (Germany) Lucas Luhr (Germany) Marco Werner	Audi TDI 5.5 L Turbo V10 (Diesel)	MI	381
4	**LMP2**	**15**	**(Mexico) Lowe's Fernández Racing**	**(Mexico) Adrian Fernández (Mexico) Luis Díaz**	**Acura ARX-01B**	MI	**360**
4	**LMP2**	**15**	**(Mexico) Lowe's Fernández Racing**	**(Mexico) Adrian Fernández (Mexico) Luis Díaz**	**Acura AL7R 3.4 L V8**	MI	**360**
5	LMP1	07	(France) Team Peugeot Total	(France) Nicolas Minassian (Portugal) Pedro Lamy (Austria) Christian Klien	Peugeot 908 HDi FAP	MI	356
5	LMP1	07	(France) Team Peugeot Total	(France) Nicolas Minassian (Portugal) Pedro Lamy (Austria) Christian Klien	Peugeot HDI 5.5 L Turbo V12 (Diesel)	MI	356
6	**GT1**	**3**	**(United States) Corvette Racing**	**(United States) Johnny O'Connell (Denmark) Jan Magnussen (Spain) Antonio García**	**Chevrolet Corvette C6.R**	MI	**349**
6	**GT1**	**3**	**(United States) Corvette Racing**	**(United States) Johnny O'Connell (Denmark) Jan Magnussen (Spain) Antonio García**	**Chevrolet LS7.R 7.0 L V8 (E85 ethanol)**	MI	**349**
7	GT1	4	(United States) Corvette Racing	(United Kingdom) Oliver Gavin (Monaco) Olivier Beretta (Switzerland) Marcel Fässler	Chevrolet Corvette C6.R	MI	348
7	GT1	4	(United States) Corvette Racing	(United Kingdom) Oliver Gavin (Monaco) Olivier Beretta (Switzerland) Marcel Fässler	Chevrolet LS7.R 7.0 L V8 (E85 ethanol)	MI	348
8	**GT2**	**62**	**(United States) Risi Competizione**	**(Brazil) Jaime Melo (Germany) Pierre Kaffer (Finland) Mika Salo**	**Ferrari F430GT**	MI	**332**
8	**GT2**	**62**	**(United States) Risi Competizione**	**(Brazil) Jaime Melo (Germany) Pierre Kaffer (Finland) Mika Salo**	**Ferrari 4.0 L V8**	MI	**332**
9	GT2	95	(Italy) Advanced Engineering (Argentina) PeCom Racing Team	(Italy) Gianmaria Bruni (Argentina) Matías Russo (Argentina) Luís Pérez Companc	Ferrari F430GT	MI	330
9	GT2	95	(Italy) Advanced Engineering (Argentina) PeCom Racing Team	(Italy) Gianmaria Bruni (Argentina) Matías Russo (Argentina) Luís Pérez Companc	Ferrari 4.0 L V8	MI	330
10	GT2	21	(United States) Panoz Team PTG	(United Kingdom) Ian James (Germany) Dominik Farnbacher	Panoz Esperante GT-LM	Y	329
10	GT2	21	(United States) Panoz Team PTG	(United Kingdom) Ian James (Germany) Dominik Farnbacher	Ford 5.0 L V8	Y	329
11	GT2	45	(United States) Flying Lizard Motorsports	(United States) Patrick Long (Germany) Jörg Bergmeister (Germany) Marc Lieb	Porsche 997 GT3-RSR	MI	326
11	GT2	45	(United States) Flying Lizard Motorsports	(United States) Patrick Long (Germany) Jörg Bergmeister (Germany) Marc Lieb	Porsche 4.0 L Flat-6	MI	326
12	GT2	44	(United States) Flying Lizard Motorsports	(United States) Johannes van Overbeek (United States) Darren Law (United States) Seth Neiman	Porsche 997 GT3-RSR	MI	326
12	GT2	44	(United States) Flying Lizard Motorsports	(United States) Johannes van Overbeek (United States) Darren Law (United States) Seth Neiman	Porsche 4.0 L Flat-6	MI	326
13	GT2	61	(United States) Risi Competizione (United States) Krohn Racing	(United States) Tracy Krohn (Sweden) Niclas Jönsson (Belgium) Eric van de Poele	Ferrari F430GT	MI	325
13	GT2	61	(United States) Risi Competizione (United States) Krohn Racing	(United States) Tracy Krohn (Sweden) Niclas Jönsson (Belgium) Eric van de Poele	Ferrari 4.0 L V8	MI	325
14	GT2	40	(United States) Robertson Racing	(United States) David Robertson (United States) Andrea Robertson (United States) David Murry	Ford GT-R Mk. VII	D	303
14	GT2	40	(United States) Robertson Racing	(United States) David Robertson (United States) Andrea Robertson (United States) David Murry	Ford 5.0 L V8	D	303
15 DNF	LMP1	9	(United States) Patrón Highcroft Racing	(Australia) David Brabham (United States) Scott Sharp (United Kingdom) Dario Franchitti	Acura ARX-02a	MI	302
15 DNF	LMP1	9	(United States) Patrón Highcroft Racing	(Australia) David Brabham (United States) Scott Sharp (United Kingdom) Dario Franchitti	Acura AR7 4.0 L V8	MI	302
16	GT2	87	(United States) Farnbacher-Loles Motorsports	(Germany) Wolf Henzler (Germany) Dirk Werner (Austria) Richard Lietz	Porsche 997 GT3-RSR	MI	274
16	GT2	87	(United States) Farnbacher-Loles Motorsports	(Germany) Wolf Henzler (Germany) Dirk Werner (Austria) Richard Lietz	Porsche 4.0 L Flat-6	MI	274
17 DNF	GT2	11	(United States) Primetime Race Group	(United States) Joel Feinberg (United Kingdom) Chris Hall (United States) Ritchie Holt	Dodge Viper Competition Coupe	D	251
17 DNF	GT2	11	(United States) Primetime Race Group	(United States) Joel Feinberg (United Kingdom) Chris Hall (United States) Ritchie Holt	Dodge 8.3 L V10	D	251
18 DNF	LMP1	66	(United States) de Ferran Motorsports	(Brazil) Gil de Ferran (France) Simon Pagenaud (New Zealand) Scott Dixon	Acura ARX-02a	MI	246
18 DNF	LMP1	66	(United States) de Ferran Motorsports	(Brazil) Gil de Ferran (France) Simon Pagenaud (New Zealand) Scott Dixon	Acura AR7 4.0 L V8	MI	246
19 DNF	GT2	007	(United Kingdom) Drayson Racing	(United Kingdom) Paul Drayson (United Kingdom) Jonny Cocker (United Kingdom) Rob Bell	Aston Martin V8 Vantage GT2	MI	204
19 DNF	GT2	007	(United Kingdom) Drayson Racing	(United Kingdom) Paul Drayson (United Kingdom) Jonny Cocker (United Kingdom) Rob Bell	Aston Martin 4.5 L V8 (E85 ethanol)	MI	204
20 DNF	LMP1	12	(United States) Autocon Motorsports	(United States) Chris McMurry (United States) Bryan Willman (Canada) Tony Burgess	Lola B06/10	D	151
20 DNF	LMP1	12	(United States) Autocon Motorsports	(United States) Chris McMurry (United States) Bryan Willman (Canada) Tony Burgess	AER P32C 4.0 L Turbo V8	D	151
21 DNF	LMP2	20	(United States) Dyson Racing Team	(United States) Butch Leitzinger (United Kingdom) Marino Franchitti (United Kingdom) Ben Devlin	Lola B08/86	MI	149
21 DNF	LMP2	20	(United States) Dyson Racing Team	(United States) Butch Leitzinger (United Kingdom) Marino Franchitti (United Kingdom) Ben Devlin	Mazda MZR-R 2.0 L Turbo I4	MI	149
22 DNF	GT2	92	(United States) BMW Rahal Letterman Racing	(United States) Tommy Milner (Germany) Dirk Müller	BMW M3 GT2	D	140
22 DNF	GT2	92	(United States) BMW Rahal Letterman Racing	(United States) Tommy Milner (Germany) Dirk Müller	BMW 4.0 L V8	D	140
23 DNF	LMP2	16	(United States) Dyson Racing Team	(United States) Chris Dyson (United Kingdom) Guy Smith (United States) Andy Lally	Lola B09/86	MI	127
23 DNF	LMP2	16	(United States) Dyson Racing Team	(United States) Chris Dyson (United Kingdom) Guy Smith (United States) Andy Lally	Mazda MZR-R 2.0 L Turbo I4	MI	127
24 DNF	GT2	28	(United States) LG Motorsports	(United States) Lou Giglotti (United States) Eric Curran (Brazil) Lucas Molo	Chevrolet Corvette C6	D	89
24 DNF	GT2	28	(United States) LG Motorsports	(United States) Lou Giglotti (United States) Eric Curran (Brazil) Lucas Molo	Chevrolet LS3 6.0 L V8	D	89
25 DNF	LMP1	37	(United States) Intersport Racing	(United States) Jon Field (United States) Clint Field (United States) Chapman Ducote	Lola B06/10	D	77
25 DNF	LMP1	37	(United States) Intersport Racing	(United States) Jon Field (United States) Clint Field (United States) Chapman Ducote	AER P32C 4.0 L Turbo V8	D	77
26 DNF	GT2	90	(United States) BMW Rahal Letterman Racing	(United States) Bill Auberlen (United States) Joey Hand	BMW M3 GT2	D	27
26 DNF	GT2	90	(United States) BMW Rahal Letterman Racing	(United States) Bill Auberlen (United States) Joey Hand	BMW 4.0 L V8	D	27
DNS	GT2	18	(Germany) VICI Racing	(Germany) Hans-Joachim Stuck (Germany) Johannes Stuck (Netherlands) Nicky Pastorelli	Porsche 997 GT3-RSR	MI	–
DNS	GT2	18	(Germany) VICI Racing	(Germany) Hans-Joachim Stuck (Germany) Johannes Stuck (Netherlands) Nicky Pastorelli	Porsche 4.0 L Flat-6	MI	–

American Le Mans Series
Previous race: None	2009 season	Next race: Sports Car Challenge of St. Petersburg
