= List of American Le Mans Series champions =

The American Le Mans Series (ALMS) was a North American sports car racing championship administered by the International Motor Sports Association (IMSA) sanctioning body. It was founded by pharmaceutical entrepreneur Don Panoz in 1999 after reaching an agreement with the French-based 24 Hours of Le Mans organiser Automobile Club de l'Ouest to form a new sports car series based on the Le Mans rulebook that would serve as a local hub for North American entrants. The series disbanded following the 2013 season when it and the Grand-Am-sanctioned Rolex Sports Car Series merged to become the IMSA SportsCar Championship. It featured several championships awarded by IMSA to the most successful competitors within each of the racing categories used by the series each season. Individual championships were awarded for being the top point scoring drivers and teams as well as chassis, engine, and tire manufacturers. Other unique championships included the IMSA Cup, Founder's Cup, Michelin Green X Challenge, and the ALMS Challenge. The Drivers', Teams', Chassis Manufacturers', and Automobile Manufacturers' Championships were awarded since the series began in 1999, while the Tire and Engine Manufacturers' Championships were introduced in the 2000 season. The champions were not formally crowned until the ALMS awards banquet after the season's final race.

== Drivers' Championship ==
From the start of the American Le Mans Series until the end of the 2002 season, individual drivers were allowed to earn up to three bonus points if they met certain criteria; any driver which led a lap of the race within their category earned one point, whichever driver led the most laps of the race earned one point, and whichever driver set the fastest lap of the race earned one point. From 2003 onward the bonus system was eradicated and drivers earned the same points as their co-drivers.

Season	LMP		—N/a	GTS	GT	—N/a
1999	(United States) Elliott Forbes-Robinson		—N/a	(Monaco) Olivier Beretta	(United States) Cort Wagner	—N/a
2000	(United Kingdom) Allan McNish		—N/a	(Monaco) Olivier Beretta	(Germany) Dirk Müller	—N/a
Season	LMP900	LMP675	—N/a	GTS	GT	—N/a
2001	(Italy) Emanuele Pirro	(Belgium) Didier de Radiguès	—N/a	(United States) Terry Borcheller	(Germany) Jörg Müller	—N/a
2002	(Denmark) Tom Kristensen	(United States) Jon Field	—N/a	(Canada) Ron Fellows	(Germany) Lucas Luhr (Germany) Sascha Maassen	—N/a
2003	(Germany) Frank Biela (Germany) Marco Werner	(United States) Chris Dyson	—N/a	(Canada) Ron Fellows (United States) Johnny O'Connell	(Germany) Lucas Luhr (Germany) Sascha Maassen	—N/a
Season	LMP1	LMP2	—N/a	GTS	GT	—N/a
2004	(Germany) Marco Werner (Finland) JJ Lehto	(United Kingdom) Ian James	—N/a	(Canada) Ron Fellows (United States) Johnny O'Connell	(Germany) Timo Bernhard	—N/a
Season	LMP1	LMP2	—N/a	GT1	GT2	—N/a
2005	(Germany) Frank Biela (Italy) Emanuele Pirro	(United States) Clint Field	—N/a	(United Kingdom) Oliver Gavin (Monaco) Olivier Beretta	(United States) Patrick Long (Germany) Jörg Bergmeister	—N/a
2006	(United Kingdom) Allan McNish (Italy) Rinaldo Capello	(Germany) Lucas Luhr (Germany) Sascha Maassen	—N/a	(United Kingdom) Oliver Gavin (Monaco) Olivier Beretta	(Germany) Jörg Bergmeister	—N/a
2007	(United Kingdom) Allan McNish (Italy) Rinaldo Capello	(Germany) Timo Bernhard (France) Romain Dumas	—N/a	(United Kingdom) Oliver Gavin (Monaco) Olivier Beretta	(Finland) Mika Salo (Brazil) Jaime Melo	—N/a
2008	(Germany) Marco Werner (Germany) Lucas Luhr	(Germany) Timo Bernhard (France) Romain Dumas	—N/a	(United States) Johnny O'Connell (Denmark) Jan Magnussen	(Germany) Jörg Bergmeister (Germany) Wolf Henzler	—N/a
Season	LMP1	LMP2	—N/a	—N/a	GT2	Challenge
2009	(Australia) David Brabham (United States) Scott Sharp	(Mexico) Adrian Fernández (Mexico) Luis Díaz	—N/a	—N/a	(United States) Patrick Long (Germany) Jörg Bergmeister	(United States) Martin Snow (United States) Melanie Snow
Season	LMP		LMPC	—N/a	GT	GTC
2010	(Australia) David Brabham (France) Simon Pagenaud		(United States) Scott Tucker	—N/a	(United States) Patrick Long (Germany) Jörg Bergmeister	(United States) Tim Pappas (Netherlands) Jeroen Bleekemolen
Season	LMP1	LMP2	LMPC	—N/a	GT	GTC
2011	(United States) Chris Dyson (United Kingdom) Guy Smith	(France) Christophe Bouchut (United States) Scott Tucker	(Mexico) Ricardo González (United States) Gunnar Jeannette (United States) Eric Lux^{1}	—N/a	(United States) Joey Hand (Germany) Dirk Müller	(United States) Tim Pappas
Season	P1	P2	PC	—N/a	GT	GTC
2012	(Germany) Klaus Graf (Germany) Lucas Luhr	(France) Christophe Bouchut (United States) Scott Tucker	(Venezuela) Alex Popow	—N/a	(United Kingdom) Oliver Gavin (United States) Tommy Milner	(United States) Cooper MacNeil
2013	(Germany) Klaus Graf (Germany) Lucas Luhr	(United States) Scott Tucker	(United States) Mike Guasch	—N/a	(Spain) Antonio García (Denmark) Jan Magnussen	(Netherlands) Jeroen Bleekemolen (United States) Cooper MacNeil

1. Eric Lux drove for a different team from teammates Ricardo González and Gunnar Jeannette. The three finished the season on equal points, and a tie breaker was not able to be utilized, therefore the three drivers all shared the championship.

== Teams' Championship ==
Season	LMP		—N/a	GTS	GT	—N/a
1999	(United States) Panoz Motorsports		—N/a	(France) Dodge Viper Team Oreca	(United States) Prototype Technology Group	—N/a
2000	(Germany) Audi Sport North America		—N/a	(France) Viper Team Oreca	(United States) Dick Barbour Racing	—N/a
Season	LMP900	LMP675	—N/a	GTS	GT	—N/a
2001	(Germany) Audi Sport North America	(United States) Dick Barbour Racing	—N/a	(United States) Corvette Racing	(Germany) BMW Motorsport	—N/a
2002	(Germany) Audi Sport North America	(United States) KnightHawk Racing	—N/a	(United States) Corvette Racing	(United States) Alex Job Racing	—N/a
2003	(Germany) Infineon Team Joest	(United States) Dyson Racing Team	—N/a	(United States) Corvette Racing	(United States) Alex Job Racing	—N/a
Season	LMP1	LMP2	—N/a	GTS	GT	—N/a
2004	(United States) ADT Champion Racing	(United States) Miracle Motorsports	—N/a	(United States) Corvette Racing	(United States) Alex Job Racing	—N/a
Season	LMP1	LMP2	—N/a	GT1	GT2	—N/a
2005	(United States) ADT Champion Racing	(United States) Intersport Racing	—N/a	(United States) Corvette Racing	(United States) Petersen/White Lightning	—N/a
2006	(United States) Audi Sport North America	(United States) Penske Motorsports	—N/a	(United States) Corvette Racing	(United States) Risi Competizione	—N/a
2007	(United States) Audi Sport North America	(United States) Penske Racing	—N/a	(United States) Corvette Racing	(United States) Risi Competizione	—N/a
2008	(United States) Audi Sport North America	(United States) Penske Racing	—N/a	(United States) Corvette Racing	(United States) Flying Lizard Motorsports	—N/a
Season	LMP1	LMP2	—N/a	—N/a	GT2	Challenge
2009	(United States) Patrón Highcroft Racing	(Mexico) Lowe's Fernández Racing	—N/a	—N/a	(United States) Flying Lizard Motorsports	(United States) Snow Racing
Season	LMP		LMPC	—N/a	GT	GTC
2010	(United States) Patrón Highcroft Racing		(United States) Level 5 Motorsports	—N/a	(United States) BMW Rahal Letterman Racing	(United States) Black Swan Racing
Season	LMP1	LMP2	LMPC	—N/a	GT	GTC
2011	(United States) Dyson Racing Team	(United States) Level 5 Motorsports	(United States) CORE Autosport	—N/a	(United States) BMW Team RLL	(United States) Black Swan Racing
Season	P1	P2	PC	—N/a	GT	GTC
2012	(United States) Muscle Milk Pickett Racing	(United States) Level 5 Motorsports	(United States) CORE Autosport	—N/a	(United States) Corvette Racing	(United States) Alex Job Racing
2013	(United States) Muscle Milk Pickett Racing	(United States) Level 5 Motorsports	(United States) CORE Autosport	—N/a	(United States) Corvette Racing	(United States) Flying Lizard Motorsports

== Manufacturer championships ==
The Chassis Manufacturers' and Automobile Manufacturers' Championships are combined into a single listing. The grand tourer categories did not have a separate Engine Manufacturers' Championship.

=== Chassis and Automobile Manufacturers' Championships ===
Season	LMP		GTS	GT
1999	(United States) Panoz		(Germany) Porsche	(Germany) Porsche
2000	(Germany) Audi		(Germany) DaimlerChrysler	(Germany) Porsche
Season	LMP900	LMP675	GTS	GT
2001	(Germany) Audi	(United Kingdom) Lola	(United States) Chevrolet	(Germany) BMW
2002	(Germany) Audi	(United Kingdom) Lola	(United States) Chevrolet	(Germany) Porsche
2003	(Germany) Audi	(United Kingdom) Lola	(United States) Chevrolet	(Germany) Porsche
Season	LMP1	LMP2	GTS	GT
2004	(Germany) Audi	(United Kingdom) Lola	(United States) Chevrolet	(Germany) Porsche
Season	LMP1	LMP2	GT1	GT2
2005	(Germany) Audi	(France) Courage	(United States) Chevrolet	(Germany) Porsche
2006	(Germany) Audi	(Germany) Porsche	(United States) Chevrolet	(Germany) Porsche
2007	(Germany) Audi	(Germany) Porsche	(United States) Chevrolet	(Italy) Ferrari
2008	(Germany) Audi	(Germany) Porsche	(United States) Chevrolet	(Germany) Porsche
Season	LMP1	LMP2	—N/a	GT2
2009	(Japan) Acura	(Japan) Acura	—N/a	(Germany) Porsche
Season	LMP		—N/a	GT
2010	(United States) HPD		—N/a	(Germany) BMW
Season	LMP1	LMP2	—N/a	GT
2011	(United Kingdom) Lola	(United Kingdom) Lola	—N/a	(Germany) BMW
Season	P1	P2	—N/a	GT
2012	(United States) HPD	(United States) HPD	—N/a	(United States) Chevrolet
2013	(United States) HPD	(United States) HPD	—N/a	(United States) Chevrolet

=== Engine Manufacturers' Championship ===
Season	LMP	
1999	(United States) Ford	
2000	(Germany) Audi	
Season	LMP900	LMP675
2001	(Germany) Audi	(Japan) Nissan
2002	(Germany) Audi	(United Kingdom) AER-MG
2003	(Germany) Audi	(United Kingdom) AER
Season	LMP1	LMP2
2004	(Germany) Audi	(United Kingdom) Judd
2005	(Germany) Audi	(United Kingdom) AER
2006	(Germany) Audi	(Germany) Porsche
2007	(Germany) Audi	(Germany) Porsche
2008	(Germany) Audi	(Germany) Porsche
2009	(Japan) Acura	(Japan) Acura
Season	LMP	
2010	(United States) HPD	
Season	LMP1	LMP2
2011	(Japan) Mazda	(United States) HPD
Season	P1	P2
2012	(United States) HPD	(United States) HPD
2013	(United States) HPD	(United States) HPD

=== Tire Manufacturers' Championship ===
Season	LMP		GTS	GT
2000	(France) Michelin		(France) Michelin	(France) Michelin
Season	LMP900	LMP675	GTS	GT
2001	(France) Michelin	(United Kingdom) Avon	(United States) Goodyear	(France) Michelin
2002	(France) Michelin	(United Kingdom) Avon	(United States) Goodyear	(France) Michelin
2003	(France) Michelin	(United States) Goodyear	(United States) Goodyear	(France) Michelin
Season	LMP1	LMP2	GTS	GT
2004	(France) Michelin	(Italy) Pirelli	(France) Michelin	(France) Michelin
Season	LMP1	LMP2	GT1	GT2
2005	(France) Michelin	(United States) Goodyear	(France) Michelin	(France) Michelin
2006	(France) Michelin	(France) Michelin	(France) Michelin	(France) Michelin
2007	(France) Michelin	(France) Michelin	(France) Michelin	(France) Michelin
2008	(France) Michelin	(France) Michelin	(France) Michelin	(France) Michelin
Season	LMP1	LMP2	—N/a	GT2
2009	(France) Michelin	(France) Michelin	—N/a	(France) Michelin
Season	LMP		—N/a	GT
2010	(France) Michelin		—N/a	(France) Michelin
Season	LMP1	LMP2	—N/a	GT
2011	(United Kingdom) Dunlop	(France) Michelin	—N/a	(France) Michelin
Season	P1	P2	—N/a	GT
2012	(France) Michelin	(United Kingdom) Dunlop	—N/a	(France) Michelin
2013	(France) Michelin	(France) Michelin	—N/a	(France) Michelin

== Other championships ==
=== IMSA Cup ===
The IMSA Cup was a championship for teams which were not designated as being run by an automobile manufacturer. The 2002 championship was awarded to a full team, while from 2003 onward the championship points were awarded to each individual entry. For the 2011 season, due to a lack of manufacturer supported teams in the ALMS, the IMSA Cup was not awarded.

Season	LMP900	LMP675	—N/a	GTS	GT	—N/a
2002	(United States) Champion Racing	(United States) KnightHawk Racing	—N/a	(Germany) Konrad Motorsport	(United States) Alex Job Racing	—N/a
2003	(United States) ADT Champion Racing	(United States) Intersport Racing	—N/a	(United States) ACEMCO Motorsports	(United States) Petersen/White Lightning	—N/a
Season	LMP1	LMP2	—N/a	GTS	GT	—N/a
2004	(United States) ADT Champion Racing	(United States) Intersport Racing	—N/a	(United States) ACEMCO Motorsports	(United States) Flying Lizard Motorsports	—N/a
Season	LMP1	LMP2	—N/a	GT1	GT2	—N/a
2005	(United States) ADT Champion Racing	(United States) Intersport Racing	—N/a	(United States) ACEMCO Motorsports	(United States) Petersen/White Lightning	—N/a
2006	(United States) Dyson Racing Team	(United States) Intersport Racing	—N/a	(United Kingdom) Aston Martin Racing	(United States) Petersen/White Lightning	—N/a
2007	(United States) Intersport Racing	(United States) Dyson Racing Team	—N/a	(United States) Doran Racing	(United States) Risi Competizione	—N/a
2008	(United States) Intersport Racing	(United States) Patrón Highcroft Racing	—N/a	(United States) Bell Motorsports	(United States) Flying Lizard Motorsports	—N/a
Season	LMP1	LMP2	—N/a	—N/a	GT2	—N/a
2009	(United States) Patrón Highcroft Racing	(Mexico) Lowe's Fernandez Racing	—N/a	—N/a	(United States) Flying Lizard Motorsports	—N/a
Season	LMP		LMPC	—N/a	GT	GTC
2010	(United States) Patrón Highcroft Racing		(United States) Green Earth Team Gunnar	—N/a	(United States) Flying Lizard Motorsports	(United States) Black Swan Racing

=== Founders Cup ===
The Founders Cup was an annual award to recognize the accomplishments of a gentleman driver. A single championship is awarded covering all categories.

Season	Champion
2008	(United States) Jon Field
2009	(United States) Joel Feinberg
2010	(United States) Bill Sweedler
2011	(United States) Bill Sweedler
2012	(United States) Cooper MacNeil
2013	(United States) Mike Guasch

== Michelin Green X Challenge ==
The Michelin Green X Challenge was a championship based on energy efficiency over the course of a season. The Green X Challenge debuted at the end of 2008, but the first championship was not awarded until the 2009 season. Two championships were awarded, one for both LMP classes and one for both GT classes.

=== Manufacturers Championship ===
Season	LMPs	GTs
2009	(Japan) Acura	(Germany) Porsche
2010	(United States) HPD	(Germany) Porsche
2011	(Japan) Mazda	(Germany) BMW
2012	(United States) HPD	(United States) Chevrolet

=== Teams Championship ===
Season	LMPs	GTs
2009	(Mexico) Lowe's Fernández Racing	(United States) Flying Lizard Motorsports
2010	(United States) Patrón Highcroft Racing	(United States) Flying Lizard Motorsports
2011	(United States) Dyson Racing Team	(United States) BMW Team RLL
2012	(United States) Muscle Milk Pickett Racing	(United States) Corvette Racing
