= 2008 Sports Car Challenge of St. Petersburg =

St. Petersburg Street Circuit

The 2008 Acura Sports Car Challenge of St. Petersburg was the second round of the 2008 American Le Mans Series season. It took place on the streets of St. Petersburg, Florida on April 5, 2008.

== Race results ==
Class winners in bold. Cars failing to complete 70% of winner's distance marked as Not Classified (NC).

Pos	Class	No	Team	Drivers	Chassis	Tire	Laps
Pos	Class	No	Team	Drivers	Engine	Tire	Laps
1	**LMP1**	**2**	**(United States) Audi Sport North America**	**(Germany) Marco Werner (Germany) Lucas Luhr**	**Audi R10 TDI**	MI	**81**
1	**LMP1**	**2**	**(United States) Audi Sport North America**	**(Germany) Marco Werner (Germany) Lucas Luhr**	**Audi 5.5 L TDI V12 (turbodiesel)**	MI	**81**
2	**LMP2**	**7**	**(United States) Penske Racing**	**(Germany) Timo Bernhard (France) Romain Dumas**	**Porsche RS Spyder Evo**	MI	**81**
2	**LMP2**	**7**	**(United States) Penske Racing**	**(Germany) Timo Bernhard (France) Romain Dumas**	**Porsche MR6 3.4 L V8**	MI	**81**
3	LMP2	9	(United States) Patrón Highcroft Racing	(United States) Scott Sharp (Australia) David Brabham	Acura ARX-01B	MI	81
3	LMP2	9	(United States) Patrón Highcroft Racing	(United States) Scott Sharp (Australia) David Brabham	Acura AL7R 3.4 L V8	MI	81
4	LMP2	6	(United States) Penske Racing	(United States) Patrick Long (Germany) Sascha Maassen	Porsche RS Spyder Evo	MI	81
4	LMP2	6	(United States) Penske Racing	(United States) Patrick Long (Germany) Sascha Maassen	Porsche MR6 3.4 L V8	MI	81
5	LMP2	16	(United States) Dyson Racing	(United States) Chris Dyson (United Kingdom) Guy Smith	Porsche RS Spyder Evo	MI	81
5	LMP2	16	(United States) Dyson Racing	(United States) Chris Dyson (United Kingdom) Guy Smith	Porsche MR6 3.4 L V8	MI	81
6	LMP2	26	(United States) Andretti Green Racing	(United States) Bryan Herta (Brazil) Christian Fittipaldi	Acura ARX-01B	MI	80
6	LMP2	26	(United States) Andretti Green Racing	(United States) Bryan Herta (Brazil) Christian Fittipaldi	Acura AL7R 3.4 L V8	MI	80
7	LMP2	8	(United States) B-K Motorsports	(United States) Gerardo Bonilla (United Kingdom) Ben Devlin	Lola B07/46	Y	80
7	LMP2	8	(United States) B-K Motorsports	(United States) Gerardo Bonilla (United Kingdom) Ben Devlin	Mazda MZR-R 2.0 L Turbo I4 (E85 ethanol)	Y	80
8	**GT1**	**4**	**(United States) Corvette Racing**	**(United Kingdom) Oliver Gavin (Monaco) Olivier Beretta**	**Chevrolet Corvette C6.R**	MI	**79**
8	**GT1**	**4**	**(United States) Corvette Racing**	**(United Kingdom) Oliver Gavin (Monaco) Olivier Beretta**	**Chevrolet LS7-R 7.0 L V8 (E85 ethanol)**	MI	**79**
9	GT1	3	(United States) Corvette Racing	(United States) Johnny O'Connell (Denmark) Jan Magnussen	Chevrolet Corvette C6.R	MI	79
9	GT1	3	(United States) Corvette Racing	(United States) Johnny O'Connell (Denmark) Jan Magnussen	Chevrolet LS7-R 7.0 L V8 (E85 ethanol)	MI	79
10	LMP2	15	(Mexico) Lowe's Fernández Racing	(Mexico) Adrian Fernández (Mexico) Luis Diaz	Acura ARX-01B	MI	78
10	LMP2	15	(Mexico) Lowe's Fernández Racing	(Mexico) Adrian Fernández (Mexico) Luis Diaz	Acura AL7R 3.4 L V8	MI	78
11	**GT2**	**71**	**(United States) Tafel Racing**	**(Germany) Dominik Farnbacher (Germany) Dirk Müller**	**Ferrari F430GT**	MI	**77**
11	**GT2**	**71**	**(United States) Tafel Racing**	**(Germany) Dominik Farnbacher (Germany) Dirk Müller**	**Ferrari 4.0 L V8**	MI	**77**
12	GT2	46	(United States) Flying Lizard Motorsports	(United States) Johannes van Overbeek (France) Patrick Pilet	Porsche 997 GT3-RSR	MI	77
12	GT2	46	(United States) Flying Lizard Motorsports	(United States) Johannes van Overbeek (France) Patrick Pilet	Porsche 3.8 L Flat-6	MI	77
13	GT2	87	(United States) Farnbacher-Loles Motorsports	(Germany) Marc Basseng (Germany) Dirk Werner	Porsche 997 GT3-RSR	MI	76
13	GT2	87	(United States) Farnbacher-Loles Motorsports	(Germany) Marc Basseng (Germany) Dirk Werner	Porsche 3.8 L Flat-6	MI	76
14	GT2	48	(United States) Corsa Motorsport	(United States) Gunnar Jeannette (United Kingdom) Johnny Mowlem	Ferrari F430GT	D	76
14	GT2	48	(United States) Corsa Motorsport	(United States) Gunnar Jeannette (United Kingdom) Johnny Mowlem	Ferrari 4.0 L V8	D	76
15	GT2	61	(United States) Risi Competizione	(Austria) Patrick Friesacher (United States) Harrison Brix	Ferrari F430GT	MI	75
15	GT2	61	(United States) Risi Competizione	(Austria) Patrick Friesacher (United States) Harrison Brix	Ferrari 4.0 L V8	MI	75
16	GT2	21	(United States) Panoz Team PTG	(United States) Joey Hand (United States) Tommy Milner (United States) Tom Sutherland	Panoz Esperante GT-LM	Y	75
16	GT2	21	(United States) Panoz Team PTG	(United States) Joey Hand (United States) Tommy Milner (United States) Tom Sutherland	Ford (Élan) 5.0 L V8	Y	75
17	GT2	44	(United States) Flying Lizard Motorsports 44	(United States) Darren Law (United States) Seth Neiman	Porsche 997 GT3-RSR	MI	74
17	GT2	44	(United States) Flying Lizard Motorsports 44	(United States) Darren Law (United States) Seth Neiman	Porsche 3.8 L Flat-6	MI	74
18	GT2	28	(United States) LG Motorsports	(United States) Lou Gigliotti (United States) Doug Peterson	Chevrolet Corvette C6	KU	74
18	GT2	28	(United States) LG Motorsports	(United States) Lou Gigliotti (United States) Doug Peterson	Chevrolet LS3 6.0 L V8	KU	74
19	LMP2	19	(United States) Van der Steur Racing	(United States) Gunnar van der Steur (United States) Robbie Pecorari	Radical SR9	KU	74
19	LMP2	19	(United States) Van der Steur Racing	(United States) Gunnar van der Steur (United States) Robbie Pecorari	AER P07 2.0 L Turbo I4	KU	74
20 DNF	LMP2	20	(United States) Dyson Racing	(United States) Butch Leitzinger (United Kingdom) Marino Franchitti	Porsche RS Spyder Evo	MI	71
20 DNF	LMP2	20	(United States) Dyson Racing	(United States) Butch Leitzinger (United Kingdom) Marino Franchitti	Porsche MR6 3.4 L V8	MI	71
21	GT2	45	(United States) Flying Lizard Motorsports	(Germany) Jörg Bergmeister (Germany) Wolf Henzler	Porsche 997 GT3-RSR	MI	71
21	GT2	45	(United States) Flying Lizard Motorsports	(Germany) Jörg Bergmeister (Germany) Wolf Henzler	Porsche 3.8 L Flat-6	MI	71
22	GT2	62	(United States) Risi Competizione	(Brazil) Jaime Melo (Finland) Mika Salo	Ferrari F430GT	MI	69
22	GT2	62	(United States) Risi Competizione	(Brazil) Jaime Melo (Finland) Mika Salo	Ferrari 4.0 L V8	MI	69
23	GT2	40	(United States) Robertson Racing	(United States) Andrea Robertson (United States) David Murry	Ford GT-R Mk.VII	D	64
23	GT2	40	(United States) Robertson Racing	(United States) Andrea Robertson (United States) David Murry	Ford 5.0 L V8	D	64
24 DNF	LMP1	1	(United States) Audi Sport North America	(Germany) Frank Biela (Italy) Emanuele Pirro	Audi R10 TDI	MI	63
24 DNF	LMP1	1	(United States) Audi Sport North America	(Germany) Frank Biela (Italy) Emanuele Pirro	Audi 5.5 L TDI V12 (turbodiesel)	MI	63
25 DNF	GT1	008	(United States) Bell Motorsports	(United States) Terry Borcheller (United States) Chapman Ducote	Aston Martin DBR9	D	48
25 DNF	GT1	008	(United States) Bell Motorsports	(United States) Terry Borcheller (United States) Chapman Ducote	Aston Martin 6.0 L V12	D	48
26 DNF	LMP1	37	(United States) Intersport Racing	(United States) Jon Field (United States) Clint Field (United States) Richard Berry	Lola B06/10	D	33
26 DNF	LMP1	37	(United States) Intersport Racing	(United States) Jon Field (United States) Clint Field (United States) Richard Berry	AER P32C 4.0 L Turbo V8 (E85 ethanol)	D	33
27 DNF	GT2	11	(United States) Primetime Race Group	(United States) Joel Feinberg (United States) Chris Hall	Dodge Viper Competition Coupe	MI	20
27 DNF	GT2	11	(United States) Primetime Race Group	(United States) Joel Feinberg (United States) Chris Hall	Dodge 8.3 L V10	MI	20
DNS	GT2	007	(United Kingdom) Drayson-Barwell	(United Kingdom) Paul Drayson (United Kingdom) Jonny Cocker	Aston Martin DBRS9	D	-
DNS	GT2	007	(United Kingdom) Drayson-Barwell	(United Kingdom) Paul Drayson (United Kingdom) Jonny Cocker	Aston Martin 6.0 L V12 (E85 ethanol)	D	-
DNS	GT2	5	(Germany) VICI Racing	(United States) Craig Stanton (United States) Nathan Swartzbaugh (Brazil) Ruben Carrapatoso	Porsche 997 GT3-RSR	KU	-
DNS	GT2	5	(Germany) VICI Racing	(United States) Craig Stanton (United States) Nathan Swartzbaugh (Brazil) Ruben Carrapatoso	Porsche 3.8 L Flat-6	KU	-

== Statistics ==
- Pole Position - #2 Audi Sport North America - 1:02.825
- Fastest Lap - #1 Audi Sport North America - 1:04.942

American Le Mans Series
Previous race: 2008 12 Hours of Sebring	2008 season	Next race: 2008 American Le Mans Series at Long Beach
