= 2009 American Le Mans Series =

39th season of the racing series organized by IMSA

Seasons
- ← 2008 2010 →

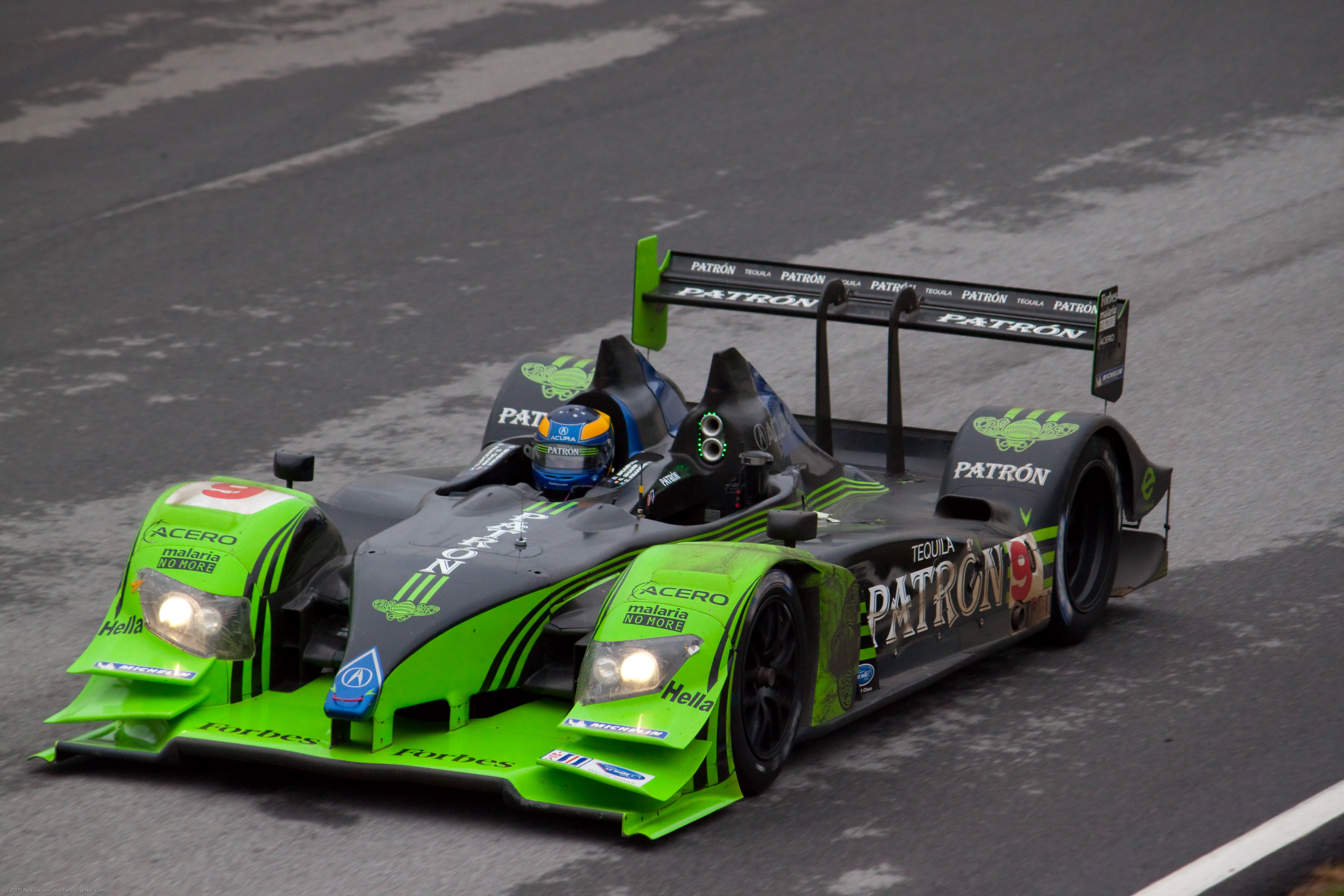
David Brabham (pictured) and Scott Sharp won the LMP1 class title for Patrón Highcroft Racing.

The 2009 American Le Mans Series season was the 39th season for the IMSA GT Championship, with it being the eleventh season with the American Le Mans Series moniker. It began on March 21, 2009, and ended on October 10, 2009 after ten events. The series was composed of Le Mans Prototypes (LMP) and Grand Tourer (GT) race cars divided into four classes: LMP1, LMP2, GT1, and GT2. A fifth category, known as the Challenge class, was also added for select races and featured Porsche 997 GT3 Cup cars from the IMSA GT3 Cup Challenge. 2009 was also the final year for GT1, with Corvette Racing abandoning the class after Long Beach and switching over to much more competitive GT2 (renamed GT) class.

== Season summary ==
This was the first time that the Michelin Green X Challenge championship was used throughout a full ALMS season after its initial introduction at the 2008 Petit Le Mans. Two champions were determined by the entry which is the most efficient over the season within the LMP and GT categories.

Patrón Highcroft Racing duo David Brabham and Scott Sharp won the main LMP1 standings, holding off De Ferran Motorsports pairing Gil de Ferran and Simon Pagenaud at the final round of the season at Mazda Raceway Laguna Seca. Adrián Fernández and Luis Díaz won the LMP2 title, in the final season of Fernández Racing, who closed at the end of the 2009 season. In GT2, Flying Lizard Motorsports' Patrick Long and Jörg Bergmeister won six races en route to the championship title. Husband-and-wife Martin and Melanie Snow won the inaugural GT Challenge class title, that ran at half of the season's ten races.

== Team changes ==
- Corvette Racing announced on September 9 that during the 2009 season the GT1 Corvettes will run at Sebring and Long Beach before competing at Le Mans, after which a new GT2 Corvette will compete for the rest of the season in preparation for 2010.
- Audi announced on December 5 that they will no longer compete in the American Le Mans Series, choosing instead to concentrate on the DTM, Intercontinental Le Mans Cup (later FIA World Endurance Championship) and 24 Hours of Le Mans. Audi's new LMP1 competitor, the R15 TDI, will compete at Sebring before returning to Europe. The cars returned for the Petit Le Mans in September.
- Highcroft Racing and De Ferran Motorsports will move from LMP2 to campaign Acura's new LMP1 ARX-02a, while Lowe's Fernandez Racing will continue to race the ARX-01B in LMP2.
- Porsche will not return with their factory-backed RS Spyders, campaigned by Penske Racing, choosing instead to compete on the Rolex Sports Car Series.
- Dyson Racing will move from Porsche RS Spyders to full-works AER Mazda-powered Lola B08/80's in the LMP2 class.
- Paul Gentilozzi announced that RSR Racing would be entering Jaguar XKRs in the GT2 category beginning in July. This however, did not happen until a one car test session during the final Laguna Seca race, starting from the pit lane.
- Team Cytosport acquired and ran an ex-Dyson Porsche RS Spyder from Mid-Ohio to the end of the season.

== Schedule ==
The 2009 schedule remained mostly identical to the 2008 schedule, although the season was shortened in length. This was done to allow teams from the American Le Mans Series to participate in events for the new Asian Le Mans Series in November. On December 18, 2008, it was announced that the Detroit race would be canceled.

The Challenge class of cars only participated in five rounds in 2009: Utah, Lime Rock, Mid-Ohio, Road America, and Laguna Seca.

Rnd	Race	Length	Circuit	Location	Date
1	57th Mobil 1 12 Hours of Sebring	12 Hours	Sebring International Raceway	Sebring, Florida	March 21
2	Acura Sports Car Challenge of St. Petersburg	1 Hour 55 Minutes	St. Petersburg Street Circuit	St. Petersburg, Florida	April 4
3	Tequila Patrón American Le Mans Series at Long Beach	1 Hour 40 Minutes	Long Beach Street Circuit	Long Beach, California	April 18
4	Utah Grand Prix	2 Hours 45 Minutes	Miller Motorsports Park	Tooele, Utah	May 17
5	Northeast Grand Prix	2 Hours 45 Minutes	Lime Rock Park	Lakeville, Connecticut	July 18
6	Acura Sports Car Challenge of Mid-Ohio	2 Hours 45 Minutes	Mid-Ohio	Lexington, Ohio	August 8
7	Time Warner Cable Road Race Showcase	2 Hours 45 Minutes	Road America	Elkhart Lake, Wisconsin	August 16
8	Grand Prix of Mosport	2 Hours 45 Minutes	Mosport International Raceway	Bowmanville, Ontario	August 30
9	Petit Le Mans	1,000 mi (1,600 km) or 10 Hours	Road Atlanta	Braselton, Georgia	September 26
10	Monterey Sports Car Championships	4 Hours	Mazda Raceway Laguna Seca	Monterey, California	October 10

== Entries ==
=== LMP1 ===
Team	Chassis	Engine	No.	Drivers	Rounds
(France) Team Peugeot Total	Peugeot 908 HDi FAP	Peugeot HDI 5.5 L Turbo V12 (Diesel)	07	(Portugal) Pedro Lamy	1, 9
(France) Team Peugeot Total	Peugeot 908 HDi FAP	Peugeot HDI 5.5 L Turbo V12 (Diesel)	07	(France) Nicolas Minassian	1, 9
(France) Team Peugeot Total	Peugeot 908 HDi FAP	Peugeot HDI 5.5 L Turbo V12 (Diesel)	07	(Austria) Christian Klien	1
(France) Team Peugeot Total	Peugeot 908 HDi FAP	Peugeot HDI 5.5 L Turbo V12 (Diesel)	08	(France) Franck Montagny	1, 9
(France) Team Peugeot Total	Peugeot 908 HDi FAP	Peugeot HDI 5.5 L Turbo V12 (Diesel)	08	(France) Stéphane Sarrazin	1, 9
(France) Team Peugeot Total	Peugeot 908 HDi FAP	Peugeot HDI 5.5 L Turbo V12 (Diesel)	08	(France) Sébastien Bourdais	1
(Germany) Audi Sport North America	Audi R15 TDI	Audi TDI 5.5 L Turbo V10 (Diesel)	1	(Germany) Lucas Luhr	1, 9
(Germany) Audi Sport North America	Audi R15 TDI	Audi TDI 5.5 L Turbo V10 (Diesel)	1	(Germany) Marco Werner	1, 9
(Germany) Audi Sport North America	Audi R15 TDI	Audi TDI 5.5 L Turbo V10 (Diesel)	1	(Germany) Mike Rockenfeller	1
(Germany) Audi Sport Team Joest	Audi R15 TDI	Audi TDI 5.5 L Turbo V10 (Diesel)	2	(Italy) Rinaldo Capello	1, 9
(Germany) Audi Sport Team Joest	Audi R15 TDI	Audi TDI 5.5 L Turbo V10 (Diesel)	2	(United Kingdom) Allan McNish	1, 9
(Germany) Audi Sport Team Joest	Audi R15 TDI	Audi TDI 5.5 L Turbo V10 (Diesel)	2	(Denmark) Tom Kristensen	1
(France) Team Oreca Matmut AIM	Oreca 01	AIM YS5.5 5.5 L V10	7	(France) Romain Dumas	9
(France) Team Oreca Matmut AIM	Oreca 01	AIM YS5.5 5.5 L V10	7	(France) Nicolas Lapierre	9
(France) Team Oreca Matmut AIM	Oreca 01	AIM YS5.5 5.5 L V10	7	(France) Olivier Panis	9
(United States) Patrón Highcroft Racing	Acura ARX-02a	Acura AR7 4.0 L V8	9	(Australia) David Brabham	All
(United States) Patrón Highcroft Racing	Acura ARX-02a	Acura AR7 4.0 L V8	9	(United States) Scott Sharp	All
(United States) Patrón Highcroft Racing	Acura ARX-02a	Acura AR7 4.0 L V8	9	(United Kingdom) Dario Franchitti	1, 9
(United Kingdom) ECO Racing	Radical SR9	ECO (AER) 5.0 L Turbo V10 (Diesel)	10	(Japan) Hideki Noda	9–10
(United Kingdom) ECO Racing	Radical SR9	ECO (AER) 5.0 L Turbo V10 (Diesel)	10	(Argentina) José Manuel Balbiani	9
(United Kingdom) ECO Racing	Radical SR9	ECO (AER) 5.0 L Turbo V10 (Diesel)	10	(South Africa) Dion von Moltke	9
(United Kingdom) ECO Racing	Radical SR9	ECO (AER) 5.0 L Turbo V10 (Diesel)	10	(United States) Cort Wagner	10
(United Kingdom) ECO Racing	Radical SR9	ECO (AER) 5.0 L Turbo V10 (Diesel)	10	(Greece) Nikolas Konstant	10
(United States) Autocon Motorsports	Lola B06/10	AER P32C 4.0 L Turbo V8	12	(United States) Bryan Willman	1, 3–4, 6–7, 9
(United States) Autocon Motorsports	Lola B06/10	AER P32C 4.0 L Turbo V8	12	(United States) Chris McMurry	1, 5, 7–9
(United States) Autocon Motorsports	Lola B06/10	AER P32C 4.0 L Turbo V8	12	(Canada) Tony Burgess	1, 5, 8–9
(United States) Autocon Motorsports	Lola B06/10	AER P32C 4.0 L Turbo V8	12	(United States) Michael Lewis	3–4
(United States) Autocon Motorsports	Lola B06/10	AER P32C 4.0 L Turbo V8	12	(United States) Tomy Drissi	6
(United States) Intersport Racing	Lola B06/10	AER P32C 4.0 L Turbo V8	37	(United States) Clint Field	All
(United States) Intersport Racing	Lola B06/10	AER P32C 4.0 L Turbo V8	37	(United States) Jon Field	All
(United States) Intersport Racing	Lola B06/10	AER P32C 4.0 L Turbo V8	37	(United States) Chapman Ducote	1–5
(United States) Corsa Motorsports	Ginetta-Zytek GZ09HS	Zytek ZJ458 4.5 L Hybrid V8	48	(United Kingdom) Johnny Mowlem	4–7, 10
(United States) Corsa Motorsports	Ginetta-Zytek GZ09HS	Zytek ZJ458 4.5 L Hybrid V8	48	(Sweden) Stefan Johansson	4–7, 10
(United States) de Ferran Motorsports	Acura ARX-02a	Acura AR7 4.0 L V8	66	(Brazil) Gil de Ferran	All
(United States) de Ferran Motorsports	Acura ARX-02a	Acura AR7 4.0 L V8	66	(France) Simon Pagenaud	All
(United States) de Ferran Motorsports	Acura ARX-02a	Acura AR7 4.0 L V8	66	(New Zealand) Scott Dixon	1, 9
(United Kingdom) Drayson Racing	Lola B09/60	Judd GV5.5 S2 5.5 L V10	88	(United Kingdom) Jonny Cocker	9–10
(United Kingdom) Drayson Racing	Lola B09/60	Judd GV5.5 S2 5.5 L V10	88	(United Kingdom) Paul Drayson	9–10
(United Kingdom) Drayson Racing	Lola B09/60	Judd GV5.5 S2 5.5 L V10	88	(United Kingdom) Rob Bell	9

=== LMP2 ===
Team	Chassis	Engine	No.	Drivers	Rounds
(United States) Team Cytosport	Porsche RS Spyder Evo	Porsche MR6 3.4 L V8	6	(Germany) Klaus Graf	6–7, 9–10
(United States) Team Cytosport	Porsche RS Spyder Evo	Porsche MR6 3.4 L V8	6	(United States) Greg Pickett	6–7, 9–10
(United States) Team Cytosport	Porsche RS Spyder Evo	Porsche MR6 3.4 L V8	6	(Germany) Sascha Maassen	9
(Mexico) Lowe's Fernández Racing	Acura ARX-01B	Acura AL7R 3.4 L V8	15	(Mexico) Luis Díaz	All
(Mexico) Lowe's Fernández Racing	Acura ARX-01B	Acura AL7R 3.4 L V8	15	(Mexico) Adrián Fernández	All
(United States) Dyson Racing Team	Lola B09/86	Mazda MZR-R 2.0 L Turbo I4	16	(United States) Chris Dyson	All
(United States) Dyson Racing Team	Lola B09/86	Mazda MZR-R 2.0 L Turbo I4	16	(United Kingdom) Guy Smith	All
(United States) Dyson Racing Team	Lola B09/86	Mazda MZR-R 2.0 L Turbo I4	16	(United States) Andy Lally	1
(United States) Dyson Racing Team	Lola B09/86 3 Lola B08/86 7	Mazda MZR-R 2.0 L Turbo I4	20	(United Kingdom) Marino Franchitti	All
(United States) Dyson Racing Team	Lola B09/86 3 Lola B08/86 7	Mazda MZR-R 2.0 L Turbo I4	20	(United States) Butch Leitzinger	All
(United States) Dyson Racing Team	Lola B09/86 3 Lola B08/86 7	Mazda MZR-R 2.0 L Turbo I4	20	(United Kingdom) Ben Devlin	1, 9
(United States) van der Steur Racing	Radical SR9	AER P07 2.0 L Turbo I4	19	(United States) Adam Pecorari	5–6, 8–9
(United States) van der Steur Racing	Radical SR9	AER P07 2.0 L Turbo I4	19	(United States) Gunnar van der Steur	5–6, 8–9
(United States) van der Steur Racing	Radical SR9	AER P07 2.0 L Turbo I4	19	(United States) Robbie Pecorari	9

=== GT1 ===
Team	Chassis	Engine	No.	Drivers	Rounds
(United States) Corvette Racing	Chevrolet Corvette C6.R	Chevrolet LS7.R 7.0 L V8 (E85 ethanol)	3	(Denmark) Jan Magnussen	1, 3
(United States) Corvette Racing	Chevrolet Corvette C6.R	Chevrolet LS7.R 7.0 L V8 (E85 ethanol)	3	(United States) Johnny O'Connell	1, 3
(United States) Corvette Racing	Chevrolet Corvette C6.R	Chevrolet LS7.R 7.0 L V8 (E85 ethanol)	3	(Spain) Antonio García	1
(United States) Corvette Racing	Chevrolet Corvette C6.R	Chevrolet LS7.R 7.0 L V8 (E85 ethanol)	4	(Monaco) Olivier Beretta	1, 3
(United States) Corvette Racing	Chevrolet Corvette C6.R	Chevrolet LS7.R 7.0 L V8 (E85 ethanol)	4	(United Kingdom) Oliver Gavin	1, 3
(United States) Corvette Racing	Chevrolet Corvette C6.R	Chevrolet LS7.R 7.0 L V8 (E85 ethanol)	4	(Switzerland) Marcel Fässler	1

=== GT2 ===
Team	Chassis	Engine	No.	Drivers	Rounds
(United Kingdom) Drayson Racing	Aston Martin V8 Vantage GT2	Aston Martin AM05 4.5 L V8 (E85 ethanol)	007	(United Kingdom) Rob Bell	1
(United Kingdom) Drayson Racing	Aston Martin V8 Vantage GT2	Aston Martin AM05 4.5 L V8 (E85 ethanol)	007	(United Kingdom) Jonny Cocker	1
(United Kingdom) Drayson Racing	Aston Martin V8 Vantage GT2	Aston Martin AM05 4.5 L V8 (E85 ethanol)	007	(United Kingdom) Paul Drayson	1
(United States) Corvette Racing	Chevrolet Corvette C6.R	Chevrolet LS7.R 6.0 L V8	3	(Denmark) Jan Magnussen	6–10
(United States) Corvette Racing	Chevrolet Corvette C6.R	Chevrolet LS7.R 6.0 L V8	3	(United States) Johnny O'Connell	6–10
(United States) Corvette Racing	Chevrolet Corvette C6.R	Chevrolet LS7.R 6.0 L V8	3	(Spain) Antonio García	9
(United States) Corvette Racing	Chevrolet Corvette C6.R	Chevrolet LS7.R 6.0 L V8	4	(Monaco) Olivier Beretta	6–10
(United States) Corvette Racing	Chevrolet Corvette C6.R	Chevrolet LS7.R 6.0 L V8	4	(United Kingdom) Oliver Gavin	6–10
(United States) Corvette Racing	Chevrolet Corvette C6.R	Chevrolet LS7.R 6.0 L V8	4	(Switzerland) Marcel Fässler	9
(United States) Primetime Race Group	Dodge Viper Competition Coupe	Dodge Viper 8.3 L V10	11	(United States) Joel Feinberg	1–9
(United States) Primetime Race Group	Dodge Viper Competition Coupe	Dodge Viper 8.3 L V10	11	(United Kingdom) Chris Hall	1–9
(United States) Primetime Race Group	Dodge Viper Competition Coupe	Dodge Viper 8.3 L V10	11	(United States) Ritchie Holt	1
(United States) Team Falken Tire	Porsche 997 GT3-RSR	Porsche M97/74 4.0 L Flat-6	17	(United States) Dominic Cicero	3, 9–10
(United States) Team Falken Tire	Porsche 997 GT3-RSR	Porsche M97/74 4.0 L Flat-6	17	(United States) Bryan Sellers	3, 9–10
(Germany) VICI Racing	Porsche 997 GT3-RSR	Porsche M97/74 4.0 L Flat-6	18	(Germany) Johannes Stuck	1, 3–6, 10
(Germany) VICI Racing	Porsche 997 GT3-RSR	Porsche M97/74 4.0 L Flat-6	18	(Germany) Hans-Joachim Stuck	1
(Germany) VICI Racing	Porsche 997 GT3-RSR	Porsche M97/74 4.0 L Flat-6	18	(Netherlands) Nicky Pastorelli	1, 4
(Germany) VICI Racing	Porsche 997 GT3-RSR	Porsche M97/74 4.0 L Flat-6	18	(United Kingdom) Richard Westbrook	3, 5–6, 10
(Germany) VICI Racing	Porsche 997 GT3-RSR	Porsche M97/74 4.0 L Flat-6	18	(Germany) Lance David Arnold	10
(United States) Panoz Team PTG	Panoz Esperante GT-LM	Ford 5.0 L V8	21	(Germany) Dominik Farnbacher	All
(United States) Panoz Team PTG	Panoz Esperante GT-LM	Ford 5.0 L V8	21	(United Kingdom) Ian James	All
(United States) Panoz Team PTG	Panoz Esperante GT-LM	Ford 5.0 L V8	22	(United States) Ryan Phinny	2
(United States) Panoz Team PTG	Panoz Esperante GT-LM	Ford 5.0 L V8	22	(United States) Tom Sutherland	2
(United States) LG Motorsports	Chevrolet Corvette C6	Chevrolet LS3 6.0 L V8	28	(United States) Eric Curran	1–3
(United States) LG Motorsports	Chevrolet Corvette C6	Chevrolet LS3 6.0 L V8	28	(United States) Lou Giglotti	1–2
(United States) LG Motorsports	Chevrolet Corvette C6	Chevrolet LS3 6.0 L V8	28	(Brazil) Lucas Molo	1
(United States) LG Motorsports	Chevrolet Corvette C6	Chevrolet LS3 6.0 L V8	28	(United States) Boris Said	3
(United States) LG Motorsports	Chevrolet Corvette C6	Chevrolet LS3 6.0 L V8	28	(United States) Matt Bell	9–10
(United States) LG Motorsports	Chevrolet Corvette C6	Chevrolet LS3 6.0 L V8	28	(United States) Tomy Drissi	9–10
(United States) LG Motorsports	Chevrolet Corvette C6	Chevrolet LS3 6.0 L V8	28	(United States) Tom Sutherland	9–10
(United States) RSR	Jaguar XKR GT2	Jaguar AJ133S 5.0 L V8	33	(United States) Paul Gentilozzi	10
(United States) RSR	Jaguar XKR GT2	Jaguar AJ133S 5.0 L V8	33	(Belgium) Marc Goossens	10
(United States) Robertson Racing	Ford GT-R Mk. VII	Ford Cammer 5.0 L V8	40	(United States) David Murry	All
(United States) Robertson Racing	Ford GT-R Mk. VII	Ford Cammer 5.0 L V8	40	(United States) David Robertson	All
(United States) Robertson Racing	Ford GT-R Mk. VII	Ford Cammer 5.0 L V8	40	(United States) Andrea Robertson	1–2, 4–10
(United States) Flying Lizard Motorsports	Porsche 997 GT3-RSR	Porsche M97/74 4.0 L Flat-6	44	(United States) Seth Neiman	1–7, 9–10
(United States) Flying Lizard Motorsports	Porsche 997 GT3-RSR	Porsche M97/74 4.0 L Flat-6	44	(United States) Darren Law	1–3, 6–9
(United States) Flying Lizard Motorsports	Porsche 997 GT3-RSR	Porsche M97/74 4.0 L Flat-6	44	(United States) Johannes van Overbeek	1, 4–5, 8–10
(United States) Flying Lizard Motorsports	Porsche 997 GT3-RSR	Porsche M97/74 4.0 L Flat-6	45	(Germany) Jörg Bergmeister	All
(United States) Flying Lizard Motorsports	Porsche 997 GT3-RSR	Porsche M97/74 4.0 L Flat-6	45	(United States) Patrick Long	All
(United States) Flying Lizard Motorsports	Porsche 997 GT3-RSR	Porsche M97/74 4.0 L Flat-6	45	(Germany) Marc Lieb	1, 9
(United States) Risi Competizione (United States) Krohn Racing	Ferrari F430 GT	Ferrari F136 GT 4.0 L V8	61	(Sweden) Niclas Jönsson	1
(United States) Risi Competizione (United States) Krohn Racing	Ferrari F430 GT	Ferrari F136 GT 4.0 L V8	61	(United States) Tracy Krohn	1
(United States) Risi Competizione (United States) Krohn Racing	Ferrari F430 GT	Ferrari F136 GT 4.0 L V8	61	(Belgium) Eric van de Poele	1
(United States) Risi Competizione	Ferrari F430 GT	Ferrari F136 GT 4.0 L V8	62	(Germany) Pierre Kaffer	All
(United States) Risi Competizione	Ferrari F430 GT	Ferrari F136 GT 4.0 L V8	62	(Brazil) Jaime Melo	All
(United States) Risi Competizione	Ferrari F430 GT	Ferrari F136 GT 4.0 L V8	62	(Finland) Mika Salo	1, 9
(United States) Farnbacher-Loles Motorsports	Porsche 997 GT3-RSR	Porsche M97/74 4.0 L Flat-6	87	(Germany) Wolf Henzler	All
(United States) Farnbacher-Loles Motorsports	Porsche 997 GT3-RSR	Porsche M97/74 4.0 L Flat-6	87	(Germany) Dirk Werner	1–5, 8
(United States) Farnbacher-Loles Motorsports	Porsche 997 GT3-RSR	Porsche M97/74 4.0 L Flat-6	87	(Austria) Richard Lietz	1
(United States) Farnbacher-Loles Motorsports	Porsche 997 GT3-RSR	Porsche M97/74 4.0 L Flat-6	87	(Austria) Martin Ragginger	6, 9
(United States) Farnbacher-Loles Motorsports	Porsche 997 GT3-RSR	Porsche M97/74 4.0 L Flat-6	87	(United States) Bryce Miller	7
(United States) Farnbacher-Loles Motorsports	Porsche 997 GT3-RSR	Porsche M97/74 4.0 L Flat-6	87	(Germany) Pierre Ehret	10
(United States) BMW Rahal Letterman Racing	BMW M3 GT2	BMW P65B40 4.0 L V8	90	(United States) Bill Auberlen	All
(United States) BMW Rahal Letterman Racing	BMW M3 GT2	BMW P65B40 4.0 L V8	90	(United States) Joey Hand	All
(United States) BMW Rahal Letterman Racing	BMW M3 GT2	BMW P65B40 4.0 L V8	90	(United Kingdom) Andy Priaulx	9
(United States) BMW Rahal Letterman Racing	BMW M3 GT2	BMW P65B40 4.0 L V8	92	(United States) Tommy Milner	All
(United States) BMW Rahal Letterman Racing	BMW M3 GT2	BMW P65B40 4.0 L V8	92	(Germany) Dirk Müller	All
(United States) BMW Rahal Letterman Racing	BMW M3 GT2	BMW P65B40 4.0 L V8	92	(Germany) Jörg Müller	9
(Italy) Advanced Engineering (Argentina) PeCom Racing Team	Ferrari F430 GT	Ferrari F136 GT 4.0 L V8	95	(Italy) Gianmaria Bruni	1
(Italy) Advanced Engineering (Argentina) PeCom Racing Team	Ferrari F430 GT	Ferrari F136 GT 4.0 L V8	95	(Argentina) Matías Russo	1
(Italy) Advanced Engineering (Argentina) PeCom Racing Team	Ferrari F430 GT	Ferrari F136 GT 4.0 L V8	95	(Argentina) Luis Pérez Companc	1

=== ALMS Challenge ===
Team	Chassis	Engine	No.	Drivers	Rounds
(United States) Gruppe Orange	Porsche 997 GT3 Cup	Porsche M97/76 3.6 L Flat-6	02	(United States) Nick Parker	4–7, 10
(United States) Gruppe Orange	Porsche 997 GT3 Cup	Porsche M97/76 3.6 L Flat-6	02	(United States) Carl Skerlong	4
(United States) Gruppe Orange	Porsche 997 GT3 Cup	Porsche M97/76 3.6 L Flat-6	02	(United States) Donald Pickering	5–7, 10
(United States) Gruppe Orange	Porsche 997 GT3 Cup	Porsche M97/76 3.6 L Flat-6	36	(United States) Bob Faieta	4–7, 10
(United States) Gruppe Orange	Porsche 997 GT3 Cup	Porsche M97/76 3.6 L Flat-6	36	(United States) Wesley Hoaglund	4–7, 10
(United States) GMG Racing	Porsche 997 GT3 Cup	Porsche M97/76 3.6 L Flat-6	05	(United States) Bret Curtis	7, 10
(United States) GMG Racing	Porsche 997 GT3 Cup	Porsche M97/76 3.6 L Flat-6	05	(United States) James Sofranos	7, 10
(United States) Orbit Racing	Porsche 997 GT3 Cup	Porsche M97/76 3.6 L Flat-6	08	(United States) Ed Brown	4–7, 10
(United States) Orbit Racing	Porsche 997 GT3 Cup	Porsche M97/76 3.6 L Flat-6	08	(United States) Bill Sweedler	4–7, 10
(United States) Orbit Racing	Porsche 997 GT3 Cup	Porsche M97/76 3.6 L Flat-6	47	(United States) Jon Baker	4–7, 10
(United States) Orbit Racing	Porsche 997 GT3 Cup	Porsche M97/76 3.6 L Flat-6	47	(United States) Guy Cosmo	4–7, 10
(United States) Velox Motorsport	Porsche 997 GT3 Cup	Porsche M97/76 3.6 L Flat-6	38	(United States) Shane Lewis	10
(United States) Velox Motorsport	Porsche 997 GT3 Cup	Porsche M97/76 3.6 L Flat-6	38	(United States) Mitchell Pagerey	10
(United States) Velox Motorsport	Porsche 997 GT3 Cup	Porsche M97/76 3.6 L Flat-6	88	(United States) Shane Lewis	6
(United States) Velox Motorsport	Porsche 997 GT3 Cup	Porsche M97/76 3.6 L Flat-6	88	(United States) Gerry Ventos	6
(United States) Snow Racing	Porsche 997 GT3 Cup	Porsche M97/76 3.6 L Flat-6	57	(United States) Martin Snow	4–7, 10
(United States) Snow Racing	Porsche 997 GT3 Cup	Porsche M97/76 3.6 L Flat-6	57	(United States) Melanie Snow	4–7, 10
(United States) P7 Racing	Porsche 997 GT3 Cup	Porsche M97/76 3.6 L Flat-6	69	(United States) Galen Bieker	10
(United States) P7 Racing	Porsche 997 GT3 Cup	Porsche M97/76 3.6 L Flat-6	69	(United States) Robert Rodriquez	10

== Season results ==
Overall winner in bold.

Rnd	Circuit	LMP1 Winning Team	LMP2 Winning Team	GT2 Winning Team	Challenge Winning Team	Results
Rnd	Circuit	LMP1 Winning Drivers	LMP2 Winning Drivers	GT2 Winning Drivers	Challenge Winning Drivers	Results
1	Sebring	**(Germany) #2 Audi Sport Team Joest**	(Mexico) #15 Fernández Racing	(United States) #62 Risi Competizione	did not participate	Results
1	Sebring	**(Denmark) Tom Kristensen** **(United Kingdom) Allan McNish** **(Italy) Rinaldo Capello**	(Mexico) Adrián Fernández (Mexico) Luis Díaz	(Brazil) Jaime Melo (Germany) Pierre Kaffer (Finland) Mika Salo	did not participate	Results
2	St. Petersburg	**(United States) #9 Highcroft Racing**	(Mexico) #15 Fernández Racing	(United States) #45 Flying Lizard Motorsports	did not participate	Results
2	St. Petersburg	**(Australia) David Brabham** **(United States) Scott Sharp**	(Mexico) Adrián Fernández (Mexico) Luis Díaz	(United States) Patrick Long (Germany) Jörg Bergmeister	did not participate	Results
3	Long Beach	**(United States) #66 de Ferran Motorsports**	(Mexico) #15 Fernández Racing	(United States) #45 Flying Lizard Motorsports	did not participate	Results
3	Long Beach	**(Brazil) Gil de Ferran** **(France) Simon Pagenaud**	(Mexico) Adrián Fernández (Mexico) Luis Díaz	(United States) Patrick Long (Germany) Jörg Bergmeister	did not participate	Results
4	Miller	**(United States) #66 de Ferran Motorsports**	(Mexico) #15 Fernández Racing	(United States) #45 Flying Lizard Motorsports	(United States) #57 Snow Racing	Results
4	Miller	**(Brazil) Gil de Ferran** **(France) Simon Pagenaud**	(Mexico) Adrián Fernández (Mexico) Luis Díaz	(United States) Patrick Long (Germany) Jörg Bergmeister	(United States) Martin Snow (United States) Melanie Snow	Results
5	Lime Rock	**(United States) #66 de Ferran Motorsports**	(United States) #20 Dyson Racing Team	(United States) #45 Flying Lizard Motorsports	(United States) #36 Gruppe Orange	Results
5	Lime Rock	**(Brazil) Gil de Ferran** **(France) Simon Pagenaud**	(United States) Butch Leitzinger (United Kingdom) Marino Franchitti	(United States) Patrick Long (Germany) Jörg Bergmeister	(United States) Wesley Hoaglund (United States) Bob Faieta	Results
6	Mid-Ohio	**(United States) #66 de Ferran Motorsports**	(Mexico) #15 Fernández Racing	(United States) #45 Flying Lizard Motorsports	(United States) #57 Snow Racing	Results
6	Mid-Ohio	**(Brazil) Gil de Ferran** **(France) Simon Pagenaud**	(Mexico) Adrián Fernández (Mexico) Luis Díaz	(United States) Patrick Long (Germany) Jörg Bergmeister	(United States) Martin Snow (United States) Melanie Snow	Results
7	Road America	**(United States) #9 Highcroft Racing**	(Mexico) #15 Fernández Racing	(United States) #90 BMW Rahal Letterman	(United States) #57 Snow Racing	Results
7	Road America	**(Australia) David Brabham** **(United States) Scott Sharp**	(Mexico) Adrián Fernández (Mexico) Luis Díaz	(United States) Joey Hand (United States) Bill Auberlen	(United States) Martin Snow (United States) Melanie Snow	Results
8	Mosport	**(United States) #9 Highcroft Racing**	(Mexico) #15 Fernández Racing	(United States) #3 Corvette Racing	did not participate	Results
8	Mosport	**(Australia) David Brabham** **(United States) Scott Sharp**	(Mexico) Adrián Fernández (Mexico) Luis Díaz	(United States) Johnny O'Connell (Denmark) Jan Magnussen	did not participate	Results
9	Road Atlanta	**(France) #08 Team Peugeot Total**	(United States) #20 Dyson Racing Team	(United States) #62 Risi Competizione	did not participate	Results
9	Road Atlanta	**(France) Franck Montagny** **(France) Stéphane Sarrazin**	(United States) Butch Leitzinger (United Kingdom) Marino Franchitti (United Kingdom) Ben Devlin	(Brazil) Jaime Melo (Germany) Pierre Kaffer (Finland) Mika Salo	did not participate	Results
10	Laguna Seca	(United States) **#66 de Ferran Motorsports**	(Mexico) #15 Fernández Racing	(United States) #45 Flying Lizard Motorsports	(United States) #47 Orbit Racing	Results
10	Laguna Seca	**(Brazil) Gil de Ferran** **(France) Simon Pagenaud**	(Mexico) Adrián Fernández (Mexico) Luis Díaz	(United States) Patrick Long (Germany) Jörg Bergmeister	(United States) Guy Cosmo (United States) John Baker	Results

Note that the GT1 class only competed in two rounds. Johnny O'Connell, Jan Magnussen, and Antonio García won the 12 Hours of Sebring for Corvette Racing, while Oliver Gavin and Olivier Beretta won for Corvette at Long Beach.

== Championships ==
Points were awarded to the top ten cars and drivers which either finish the race or complete 70% of the winner's distance, except in the ALMS Challenge category where cars and drivers only have to complete 50% of their class winner's distance. Teams with multiple entries only scored the points of their highest finishing entry in each race. Drivers were required to drive a minimum of 45 minutes to earn points, except for the Long Beach event which required only 30 minutes. The GT1 category was only used for two events and no championships were awarded in that category.

Points System
Race Distance	Position									
Race Distance	1st	2nd	3rd	4th	5th	6th	7th	8th	9th	10th
Less than three hours	20	16	13	10	8	6	4	3	2	1
Between four and eight hours	25	21	18	15	13	11	9	8	7	6
More than eight hours	30	26	23	20	18	16	14	13	12	11

=== Team championships ===
Teams with full entries were awarded points in the team championships. Teams which participated in partial season or on a race by race basis were not counted as part of the championship.

==== LMP1 standings ====
Pos	Team	Chassis	Engine	Rd 1	Rd 2	Rd 3	Rd 4	Rd 5	Rd 6	Rd 7	Rd 8	Rd 9	Rd 10	Total
1	(United States) Patrón Highcroft Racing	Acura ARX-02a	Acura AR7 4.0 L V8	18	20	16	16	16	16	20	20	16	21	179
2	(United States) de Ferran Motorsports	Acura ARX-02a	Acura AR7 4.0 L V8	0	13	20	20	20	20	16	16	12	25	162
3	(United States) Intersport Racing	Lola B06/10	AER P32C 4.0 L Turbo V8	0	16	13	13	8	13	13	13	14	13	116
4	(United States) Autocon Motorsports	Lola B06/10	AER P32C 4.0 L Turbo V8	0		10	0	10	0	8	0	13	18	59
5	(United States) Corsa Motorsports	Ginetta-Zytek GZ09HS	Zytek ZJ458 4.5 L Hybrid V8				10	13	10	10			15	58

==== LMP2 standings ====
Pos	Team	Chassis	Engine	Rd 1	Rd 2	Rd 3	Rd 4	Rd 5	Rd 6	Rd 7	Rd 8	Rd 9	Rd 10	Total
1	(Mexico) Lowe's Fernández Racing	Acura ARX-01B	Acura AL7R 3.4 L V8	30	20	20	20	16	20	20	20	26	25	217
2	(United States) Dyson Racing Team	Lola B09/86	Mazda MZR-R 2.0 L Turbo I4	0	16	16	16	20	13	16	16	30	0	143

==== GT2 standings ====
Pos	Team	Chassis	Engine	Rd 1	Rd 2	Rd 3	Rd 4	Rd 5	Rd 6	Rd 7	Rd 8	Rd 9	Rd 10	Total
1	(United States) Flying Lizard Motorsports	Porsche 997 GT3-RSR	Porsche M97/74 4.0 L Flat-6	20	20	20	20	20	20	10	8	18	25	181
2	(United States) Risi Competizione	Ferrari F430 GT	Ferrari F136 GT 4.0 L V8	30	0	16	13	16	8	8	16	30	0	137
3	(United States) BMW Rahal Letterman Racing	BMW M3 GT2	BMW P65B40 4.0 L V8	0	16	13	4	13	13	20	2	26	11	118
4	(United States) Farnbacher-Loles Racing	Porsche 997 GT3-RSR	Porsche M97/74 4.0 L Flat-6	13	4	1	16	10	6	1	10	23	18	102
5	(United States) Panoz Team PTG	Panoz Esperante GT-LM	Ford 5.0 L V8	23	13	6	10	6	4	0	6	12	15	95
6	(United States) Corvette Racing	Chevrolet Corvette C6.R	Chevrolet LS7.R 6.0 L V8						16	13	20	20	21	90
7	(United States) Robertson Racing	Ford GT-R Mk. VII	Ford Cammer 5.0 L V8	14	6	2	1	2	1	4	1	11	0	42
8	(United States) Primetime Race Group	Dodge Viper Competition Coupe	Dodge Viper 8.3 L V10	0	0	4	2	3		2	3	0		14
9	(United States) Team Falken Tire	Porsche 997 GT3-RSR	Porsche M97/74 4.0 L Flat-6			0						0	8	8

==== ALMS Challenge standings ====
Gruppe Orange tied on points for the ALMS Challenge Team Championship, but Snow Racing broke the tie by having three wins over the season compared to Gruppe Orange's one.

Pos	Team	Rd 1	Rd 2	Rd 3	Rd 4	Rd 5	Rd 6	Rd 7	Rd 8	Rd 9	Rd 10	Total
1	(United States) Snow Racing				20	10	20	20			0	70
2	(United States) Gruppe Orange				0	20	13	16			21	70
3	(United States) Orbit Racing				0	16	16	10			25	67
4	(United States) P7 Racing										18	18
5	(United States) GMG Racing							0			13	13
6	(United States) Velox Motorsport						10				0	10

=== Driver championships ===
Drivers who participated in races but failed to score points over the course of the season are not listed.

==== LMP1 standings ====
Pos	Driver	Team	Rd 1	Rd 2	Rd 3	Rd 4	Rd 5	Rd 6	Rd 7	Rd 8	Rd 9	Rd 10	Total
1=	(Australia) David Brabham	(United States) Patrón Highcroft Racing	18	20	16	16	16	16	20	20	16	21	179
1=	(United States) Scott Sharp	(United States) Patrón Highcroft Racing	18	20	16	16	16	16	20	20	16	21	179
3=	(Brazil) Gil de Ferran	(United States) de Ferran Motorsports	0	13	20	20	20	20	16	16	12	25	162
3=	(France) Simon Pagenaud	(United States) de Ferran Motorsports	0	13	20	20	20	20	16	16	12	25	162
5=	(United States) Jon Field	(United States) Intersport Racing	0	16	13	13	8	13	13	13	14	13	116
5=	(United States) Clint Field	(United States) Intersport Racing	0	16	13	13	8	13	13	13	14	13	116
7=	(United Kingdom) Johnny Mowlem	(United States) Corsa Motorsports				10	13	10	10			15	58
7=	(Sweden) Stefan Johansson	(United States) Corsa Motorsports				10	13	10	10			15	58
9=	(France) Franck Montagny	(France) Team Peugeot Total	26								30		56
9=	(France) Stéphane Sarrazin	(France) Team Peugeot Total	26								30		56
11=	(United Kingdom) Allan McNish	(Germany) Audi Sport Team Joest	30								23		53
11=	(Italy) Rinaldo Capello	(Germany) Audi Sport Team Joest	30								23		53
13=	(United States) Bryan Willman	(United States) Autocon Motorsports	0		10	0		0	8		13	18	49
13=	(United States) Chris McMurry	(United States) Autocon Motorsports	0				10		8	0	13	18	49
15=	(France) Nicolas Minassian	(France) Team Peugeot Total	20								26		46
15=	(Portugal) Pedro Lamy	(France) Team Peugeot Total	20								26		46
17=	(Germany) Lucas Luhr	(Germany) Audi Sport North America	23								20		43
17=	(Germany) Marco Werner	(Germany) Audi Sport North America	23								20		43
19	(United States) Chapman Ducote	(United States) Intersport Racing	0	16	13	13							42
20	(Canada) Tony Burgess	(United States) Autocon Motorsports	0				10			0	13	18	41
21	(United Kingdom) Dario Franchitti	(United States) Patrón Highcroft Racing	18								16		34
22	(Denmark) Tom Kristensen	(Germany) Audi Sport Team Joest	30										30
23	(France) Sébastien Bourdais	(France) Team Peugeot Total	26										26
24	(Germany) Mike Rockenfeller	(Germany) Audi Sport North America	23										23
25	(Austria) Christian Klien	(France) Team Peugeot Total	20										20
26=	(France) Nicolas Lapierre	(France) Team Oreca Matmut AIM									18		18
26=	(France) Romain Dumas	(France) Team Oreca Matmut AIM									18		18
28	(New Zealand) Scott Dixon	(United States) de Ferran Motorsports	0								12		12
29	(United States) Michael Lewis	(United States) Autocon Motorsports			10	0							10

==== LMP2 standings ====
Pos	Driver	Team	Rd 1	Rd 2	Rd 3	Rd 4	Rd 5	Rd 6	Rd 7	Rd 8	Rd 9	Rd 10	Total
1=	(Mexico) Adrián Fernández	(Mexico) Lowe's Fernández Racing	30	20	20	20	16	20	20	20	26	25	217
1=	(Mexico) Luis Díaz	(Mexico) Lowe's Fernández Racing	30	20	20	20	16	20	20	20	26	25	217
3=	(United States) Butch Leitzinger	(United States) Dyson Racing Team	0	13	13	16	20	13	16	16	30	0	137
3=	(United Kingdom) Marino Franchitti	(United States) Dyson Racing Team	0	13	13	16	20	13	16	16	30	0	137
5	(Germany) Klaus Graf	(United States) Team Cytosport						16	13		23	21	73
6=	(United States) Chris Dyson	(United States) Dyson Racing Team	0	16	16	13	0	0	10	0			55
6=	(United Kingdom) Guy Smith	(United States) Dyson Racing Team	0	16	16	13	0	0	10	0			55
8	(United States) Greg Pickett	(United States) Team Cytosport						16	13		0	21	50
9	(United Kingdom) Ben Devlin	(United States) Dyson Racing Team	0								30	0	30
10	(Germany) Sascha Maassen	(United States) Team Cytosport									23		23
11=	(United States) Gunnar van der Steur	(United States) van der Steur Racing					13	0		0	0		13
11=	(United States) Adam Pecorari	(United States) van der Steur Racing					13	0		0	0		13

==== GT2 standings ====
Pos	Driver	Team	Rd 1	Rd 2	Rd 3	Rd 4	Rd 5	Rd 6	Rd 7	Rd 8	Rd 9	Rd 10	Total
1=	(United States) Patrick Long	(United States) Flying Lizard Motorsports	20	20	20	20	20	20	10	8	18	25	181
1=	(Germany) Jörg Bergmeister	(United States) Flying Lizard Motorsports	20	20	20	20	20	20	10	8	18	25	181
3=	(Brazil) Jaime Melo	(United States) Risi Competizione	30	0	16	13	16	8	8	16	30	0	137
3=	(Germany) Pierre Kaffer	(United States) Risi Competizione	30	0	16	13	16	8	8	16	30	0	137
5	(Germany) Wolf Henzler	(United States) Farnbacher-Loles Racing	13	4	1	16	10	6	1	10	23	18	102
6=	(United States) Tommy Milner	(United States) BMW Rahal Letterman Racing	0	16	13	4	1	13	16	0	26	11	100
6=	(Germany) Dirk Müller	(United States) BMW Rahal Letterman Racing	0	16	13	4	1	13	16	0	26	11	100
8=	(Germany) Dominik Farnbacher	(United States) Panoz Team PTG	23	13	6	10	6	4	0	6	12	15	95
8=	(United Kingdom) Ian James	(United States) Panoz Team PTG	23	13	6	10	6	4	0	6	12	15	95
10=	(United States) Johnny O'Connell	(United States) Corvette Racing						16	13	20	16	21	86
10=	(Denmark) Jan Magnussen	(United States) Corvette Racing						16	13	20	16	21	86
12	(United States) Seth Neiman	(United States) Flying Lizard Motorsports	18	8	8	6	4	2	3		14	13	76
13	(Finland) Mika Salo	(United States) Risi Competizione	30								30		60
14	(United States) Johannes van Overbeek	(United States) Flying Lizard Motorsports	18			6	4			4	14	13	59
15	(United States) Darren Law	(United States) Flying Lizard Motorsports	18	8	8			2	3	4	14		57
16=	(United Kingdom) Oliver Gavin	(United States) Corvette Racing						10	6	13	20	6	55
16=	(Monaco) Olivier Beretta	(United States) Corvette Racing						10	6	13	20	6	55
18	(Germany) Marc Lieb	(United States) Flying Lizard Motorsports	20								18		54
18	(Germany) Marc Lieb	(United States) Farnbacher-Loles Racing				16							54
19	(Germany) Dirk Werner	(United States) Farnbacher-Loles Racing	13	4	1					10	23		51
20=	(United States) Joey Hand	(United States) BMW Rahal Letterman Racing	0	0	3	3	13	3	20	2	0	0	44
20=	(United States) Bill Auberlen	(United States) BMW Rahal Letterman Racing	0	0	3	3	13	3	20	2	0	0	44
22	(United States) David Murry	(United States) Robertson Racing	14	6	2	1	2	1	4	1	11	0	42
23	(United States) Andrea Robertson	(United States) Robertson Racing	14	6		1	2	1	4	1	11	0	40
24	(United States) David Robertson	(United States) Robertson Racing	14		2	1	2	1	4	1	11	0	36
25	(Germany) Johannes Stuck	(Germany) T-Mobile VICI Racing	0		10	8	8					9	35
26	(United Kingdom) Richard Westbrook	(Germany) T-Mobile VICI Racing			10		8					9	27
27=	(Italy) Gianmaria Bruni	(Italy) Advanced Engineering PeCom	26										26
27=	(Argentina) Matías Russo	(Italy) Advanced Engineering PeCom	26										26
27=	(Argentina) Luís Pérez Companc	(Italy) Advanced Engineering PeCom	26										26
27=	(Germany) Jörg Müller	(United States) BMW Rahal Letterman Racing									26		26
31=	(Switzerland) Marcel Fässler	(United States) Corvette Racing									20		20
31=	(United States) Tom Sutherland	(United States) LG Motorsports									13	7	20
31=	(United States) Tomy Drissi	(United States) LG Motorsports									13	7	20
34	(Germany) Pierre Ehret	(Germany) Farnbacher-Loles Motorsport										18	18
35	(United States) Lou Giglotti	(United States) LG Motorsports	0	10	0							7	17
36=	(United States) Tracy Krohn	(United States) Risi Competizione	16										16
36=	(Belgium) Eric van de Poele	(United States) Risi Competizione	16										16
36=	(Sweden) Niclas Jönsson	(United States) Risi Competizione	16										16
36=	(Spain) Antonio García	(United States) Corvette Racing									16		16
40=	(United States) Joel Feinberg	(United States) Primetime Race Group	0	0	4	2	3		2	3	0		14
40=	(United Kingdom) Chris Hall	(United States) Primetime Race Group	0	0	4	2	3		2	3	0		14
42=	(Austria) Richard Lietz	(United States) Farnbacher-Loles Racing	13										13
42=	(United States) Matt Bell	(United States) LG Motorsports									13		13
44	(United States) Bryce Miller	(United States) Farnbacher-Loles Racing					10		1				11
45	(United States) Eric Curran	(United States) LG Motorsports	0	10									10
46=	(Netherlands) Nicky Pastorelli	(Germany) T-Mobile VICI Racing				8							8
46=	(United States) Bryan Sellers	(United States) Team Falken Tire			0						0	8	8
46=	(United States) Dominic Cicero	(United States) Team Falken Tire			0						0	8	8
49	(Austria) Martin Ragginger	(Germany) Farnbacher-Loles Motorsport						6					6

==== ALMS Challenge standings ====
Driver points were awarded collectively, with all the drivers who have driven for a team being awarded the same number of points.

Pos	Drivers	No.	Team	Rd 1	Rd 2	Rd 3	Rd 4	Rd 5	Rd 6	Rd 7	Rd 8	Rd 9	Rd 10	Total
1	(United States) Martin Snow	#57	(United States) Snow Racing				20	10	20	20			0	70
1	(United States) Melanie Snow	#57	(United States) Snow Racing				20	10	20	20			0	70
2	(United States) Nick Parker	#02	(United States) Gruppe Orange				0	13	8	16			21	58
2	(United States) Donald Pickering	#02	(United States) Gruppe Orange					13	8	16			21	58
2	(United States) Carl Skerlong	#02	(United States) Gruppe Orange				0							58
3	(United States) Guy Cosmo	#47	(United States) Orbit Racing				0	0	16	10			25	51
3	(United States) John Baker	#47	(United States) Orbit Racing				0	0	16	10			25	51
4	(United States) Wesley Hoaglund	#36	(United States) Gruppe Orange				0	20	13	13			0	46
4	(United States) Bob Faieta	#36	(United States) Gruppe Orange				0	20	13	13			0	46
5	(United States) Ed Brown	#08	(United States) Orbit Racing				0	16	0	8			15	39
5	(United States) Bill Sweedler	#08	(United States) Orbit Racing				0	16	0	8			15	39
6	(United States) Robert Rodriguez	#69	(United States) P7 Racing										18	18
6	(United States) Galen Bieker	#69	(United States) P7 Racing										18	18
7	(United States) Bret Curtis	#05	(United States) GMG Racing							0			13	13
7	(United States) James Sofronas	#05	(United States) GMG Racing							0			13	13
8	(United States) Shane Lewis	#88	(United States) Velox Motorsport						10				0	10
8	(United States) Gerry Ventos	#88	(United States) Velox Motorsport						10					10
8	(United States) Mitchell Pagerey	#88	(United States) Velox Motorsport										0	10

== Bibliography ==
- Machaquereiro, John; et al. (2010). American Le Mans Series 2009 Season Yearbook. TPP Publishing Inc. ASIN B002WWAUBS.
