= 2008 12 Hours of Sebring =

Sports car endurance race

Track map of the Sebring International Raceway

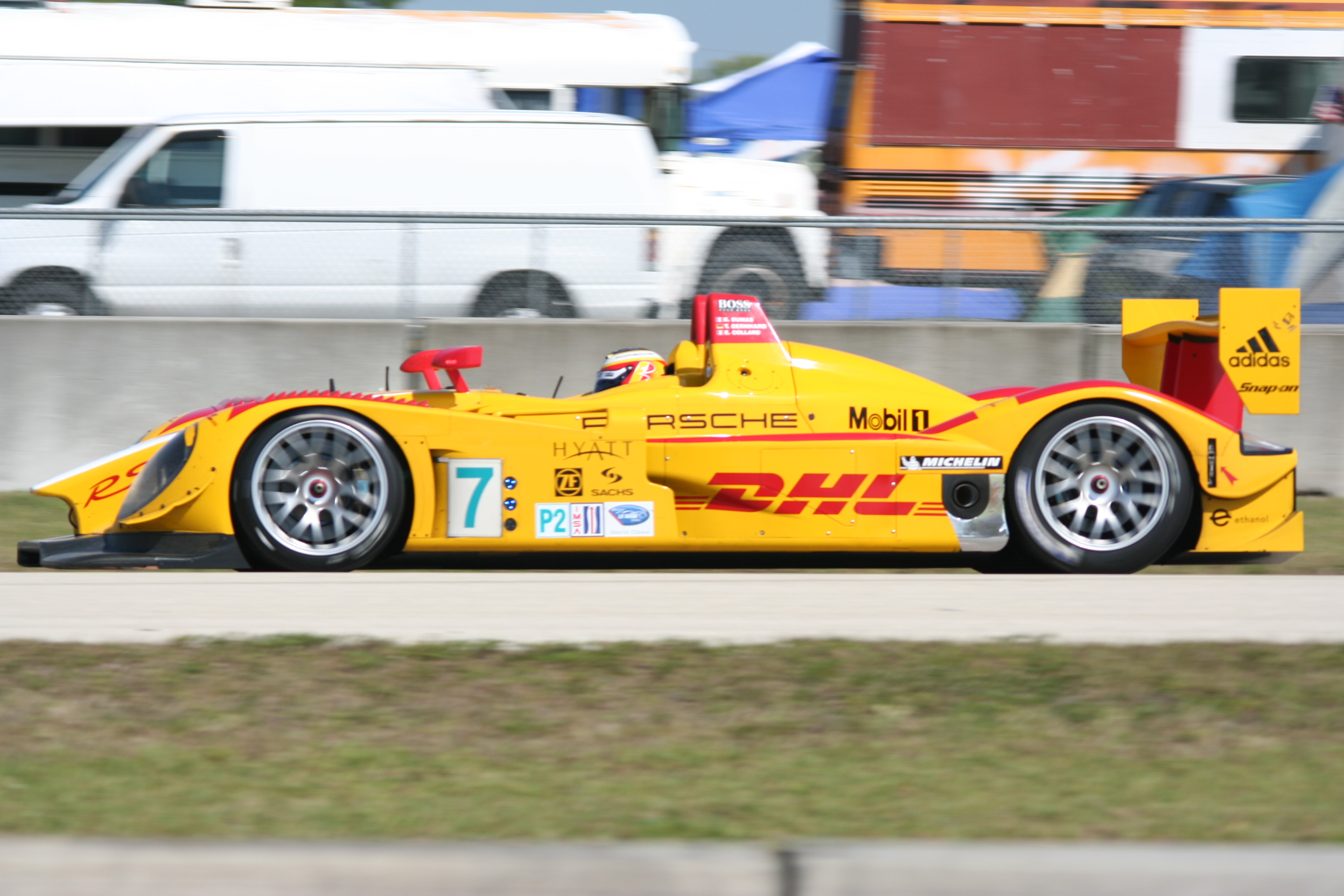
Overall winner

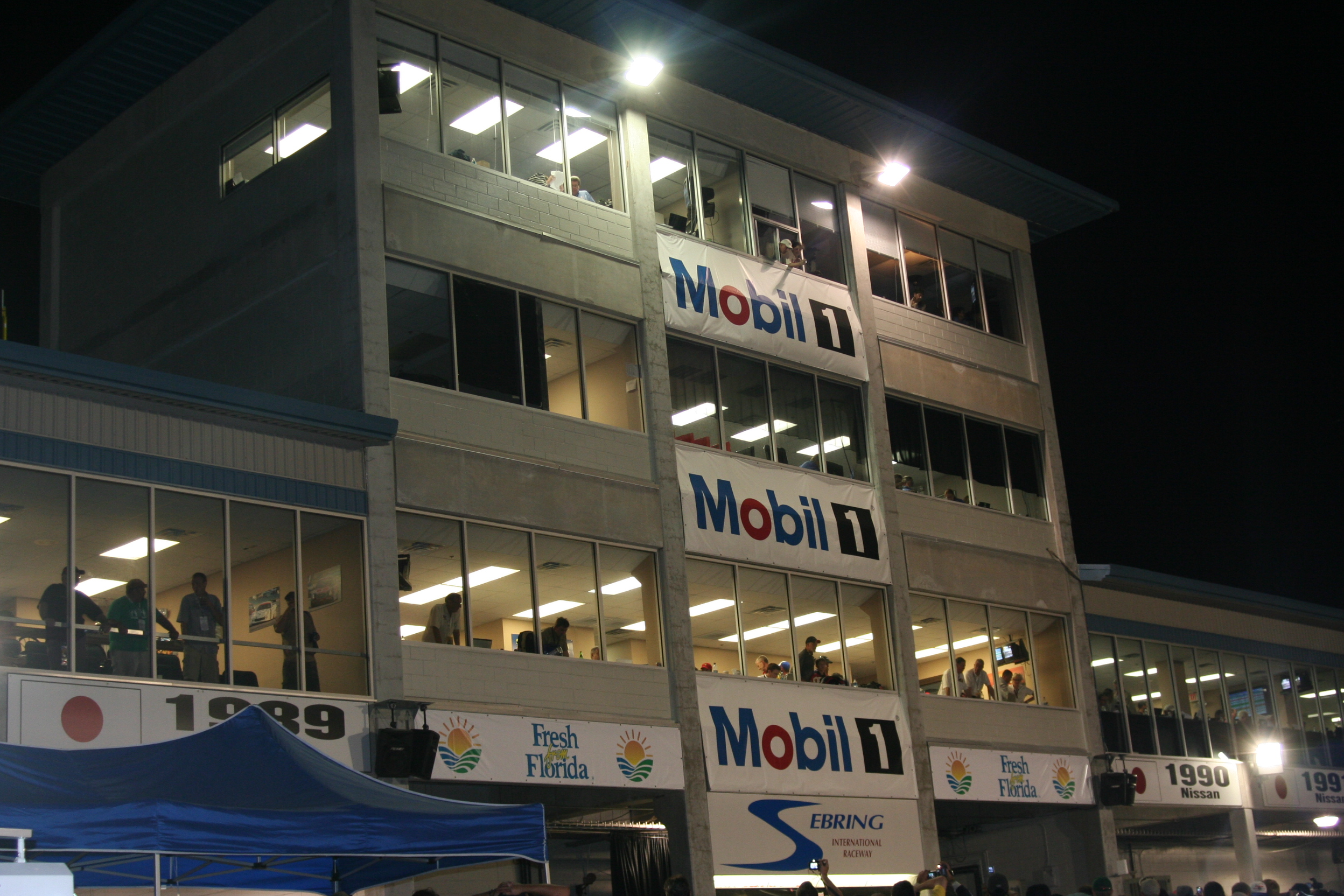
Press box near the end of the event

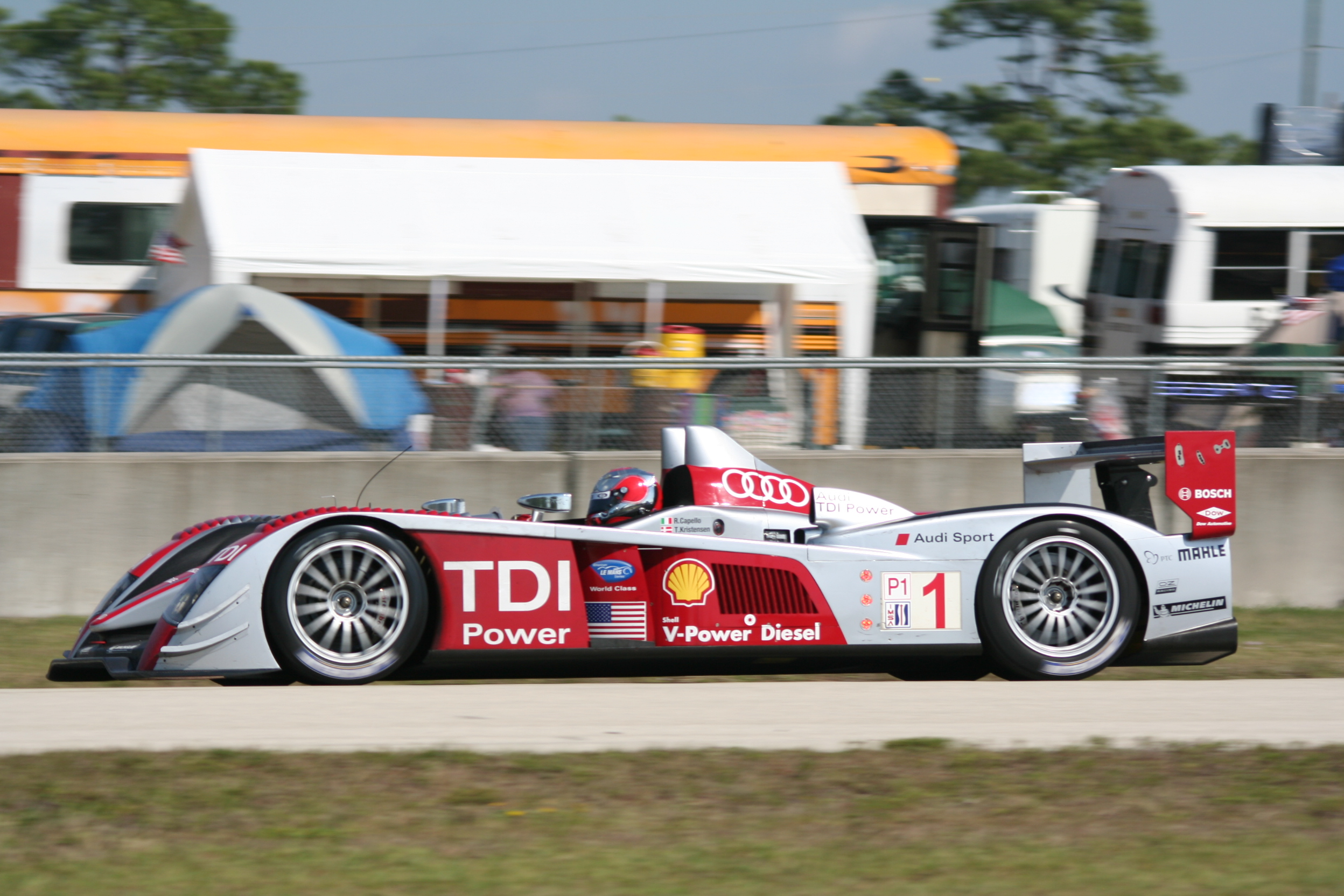
LMP1 class winner

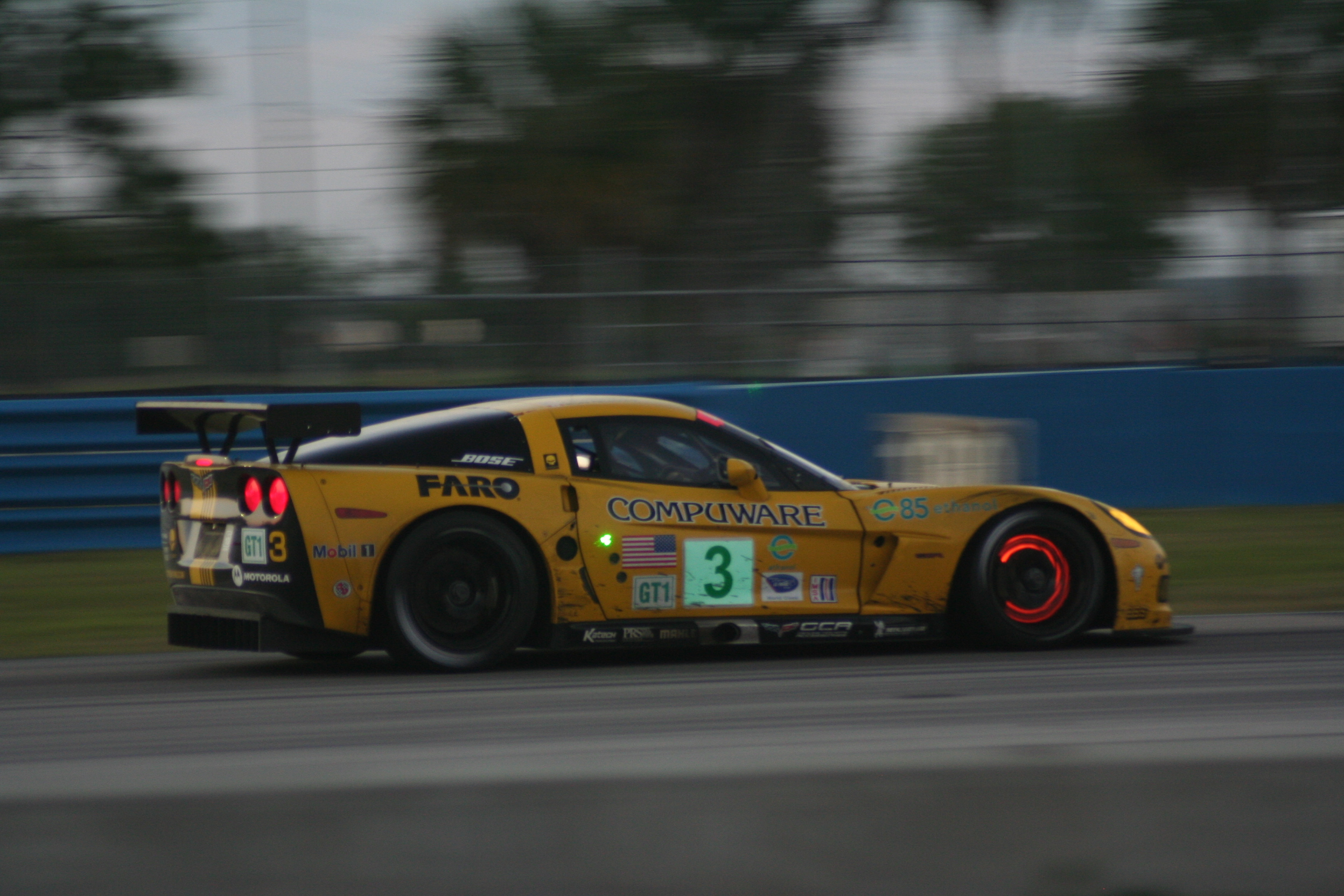
GT1 class winner

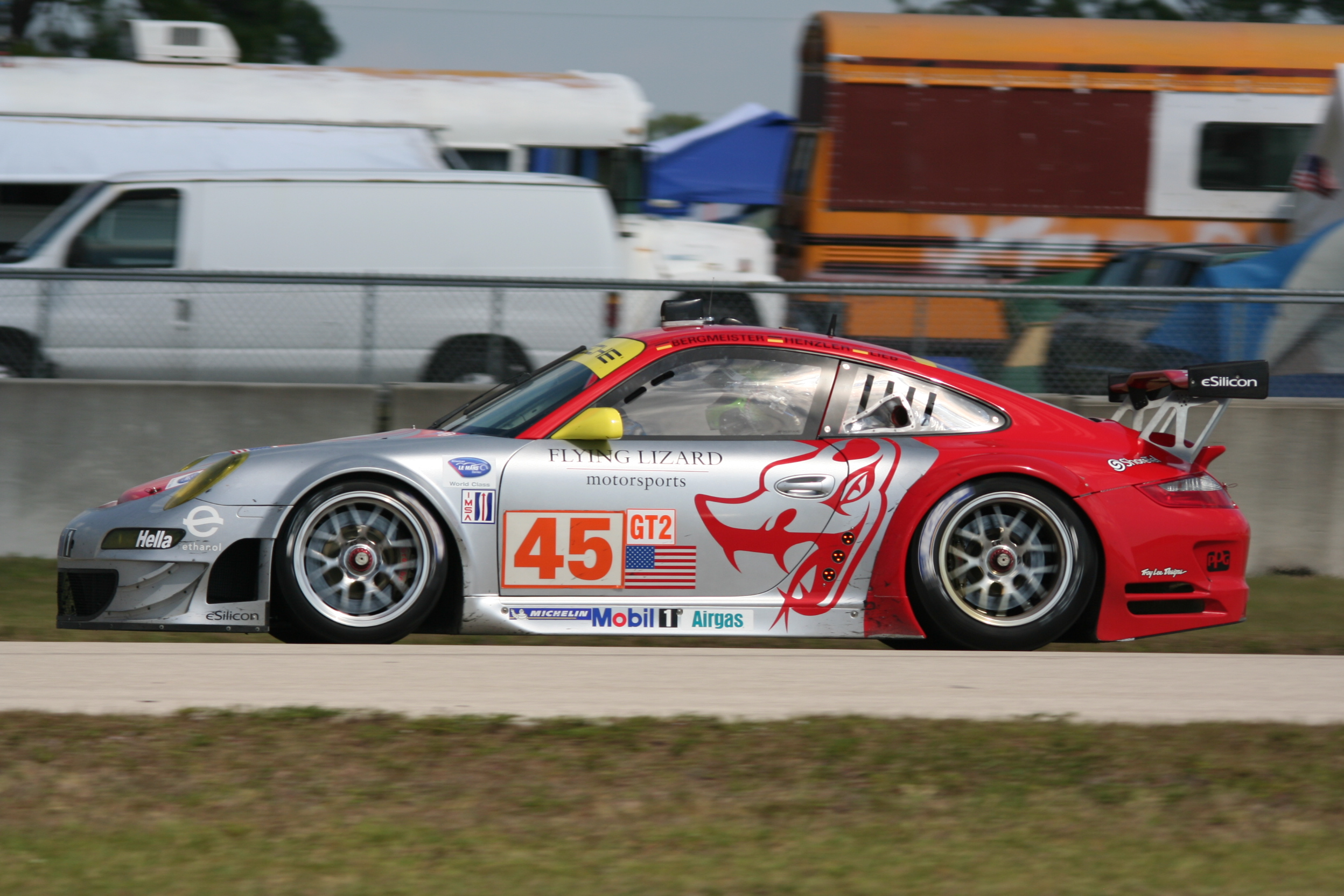
GT2 class winner

The 2008 Mobil 1 12 Hours of Sebring presented by Fresh from Florida was the 56th running of this event and the opening round of the 2008 American Le Mans Series season. It took place at Sebring International Raceway, Florida on March 15, 2008. Porsche was able to defeat Audi, marking the first loss for Audi at Sebring since 1999, while Porsche marks its first overall win at Sebring since 1988, the 20th anniversary since its last win.

The Porsche's win was also the first time in 14 years that the non-premier class of the race won the 12 Hours of Sebring overall, and the third time in history; it was also the first time an LMP2 car won the 12 Hours of Sebring since the race has become a part of the ALMS. The last time that the non-premier class won overall in Sebring was 1994, when Clayton Cunningham Racing, participating in the 1994 IMSA GT Championship season as a GTS-class entry, defeated the flagship World Sports Cars in a Nissan 300ZX.

== Race results ==
Class winners in bold. Cars failing to complete 70% of winner's distance marked as Not Classified (NC).

Pos	Class	No	Team	Drivers	Chassis	Tire	Laps
Pos	Class	No	Team	Drivers	Engine	Tire	Laps
1	**LMP2**	**7**	**(United States) Penske Racing**	**(Germany) Timo Bernhard (France) Romain Dumas (France) Emmanuel Collard**	**Porsche RS Spyder Evo**	MI	**351**
1	**LMP2**	**7**	**(United States) Penske Racing**	**(Germany) Timo Bernhard (France) Romain Dumas (France) Emmanuel Collard**	**Porsche MR6 3.4 L V8**	MI	**351**
2	LMP2	20	(United States) Dyson Racing	(United States) Butch Leitzinger (United Kingdom) Marino Franchitti (United States) Andy Lally	Porsche RS Spyder Evo	MI	351
2	LMP2	20	(United States) Dyson Racing	(United States) Butch Leitzinger (United Kingdom) Marino Franchitti (United States) Andy Lally	Porsche MR6 3.4 L V8	MI	351
3	**LMP1**	**1**	**(United States) Audi Sport North America**	**(Italy) Rinaldo Capello (United Kingdom) Allan McNish (Denmark) Tom Kristensen**	**Audi R10 TDI**	MI	**351**
3	**LMP1**	**1**	**(United States) Audi Sport North America**	**(Italy) Rinaldo Capello (United Kingdom) Allan McNish (Denmark) Tom Kristensen**	**Audi TDI 5.5 L Turbo V12 (Diesel)**	MI	**351**
4	LMP2	16	(United States) Dyson Racing	(United States) Chris Dyson (United Kingdom) Guy Smith	Porsche RS Spyder Evo	MI	350
4	LMP2	16	(United States) Dyson Racing	(United States) Chris Dyson (United Kingdom) Guy Smith	Porsche MR6 3.4 L V8	MI	350
5	LMP2	9	(United States) Patrón Highcroft Racing	(United States) Scott Sharp (Australia) David Brabham (Sweden) Stefan Johansson	Acura ARX-01B	MI	349
5	LMP2	9	(United States) Patrón Highcroft Racing	(United States) Scott Sharp (Australia) David Brabham (Sweden) Stefan Johansson	Acura AL7R 3.4 L V8	MI	349
6	LMP1	2	(United States) Audi Sport North America	(Germany) Marco Werner (Germany) Lucas Luhr (Germany) Mike Rockenfeller	Audi R10 TDI	MI	333
6	LMP1	2	(United States) Audi Sport North America	(Germany) Marco Werner (Germany) Lucas Luhr (Germany) Mike Rockenfeller	Audi TDI 5.5 L Turbo V12 (Diesel)	MI	333
7	LMP2	27	(Switzerland) Horag Lista Racing	(Switzerland) Fredy Lienhard (Belgium) Didier Theys (Netherlands) Jan Lammers	Porsche RS Spyder Evo	MI	333
7	LMP2	27	(Switzerland) Horag Lista Racing	(Switzerland) Fredy Lienhard (Belgium) Didier Theys (Netherlands) Jan Lammers	Porsche MR6 3.4 L V8	MI	333
8	**GT1**	**3**	**(United States) Corvette Racing**	**(United States) Johnny O'Connell (Denmark) Jan Magnussen (Canada) Ron Fellows**	**Chevrolet Corvette C6.R**	MI	**328**
8	**GT1**	**3**	**(United States) Corvette Racing**	**(United States) Johnny O'Connell (Denmark) Jan Magnussen (Canada) Ron Fellows**	**Chevrolet LS7-R 7.0 L V8**	MI	**328**
9	LMP1	37	(United States) Intersport Racing	(United States) Jon Field (United States) Clint Field (United States) Richard Berry	Lola B06/10	D	327
9	LMP1	37	(United States) Intersport Racing	(United States) Jon Field (United States) Clint Field (United States) Richard Berry	AER P32C 4.0 L Turbo V8 (E85 ethanol)	D	327
10	GT1	4	(United States) Corvette Racing	(United Kingdom) Oliver Gavin (Monaco) Olivier Beretta (Italy) Max Papis	Chevrolet Corvette C6.R	MI	320
10	GT1	4	(United States) Corvette Racing	(United Kingdom) Oliver Gavin (Monaco) Olivier Beretta (Italy) Max Papis	Chevrolet LS7-R 7.0 L V8	MI	320
11	LMP1	07	(France) Peugeot Sport Total	(France) Nicolas Minassian (France) Stéphane Sarrazin (Portugal) Pedro Lamy	Peugeot 908 HDi FAP	MI	318
11	LMP1	07	(France) Peugeot Sport Total	(France) Nicolas Minassian (France) Stéphane Sarrazin (Portugal) Pedro Lamy	Peugeot HDi 5.5 L Turbo V12 (Diesel)	MI	318
12	**GT2**	**45**	**(United States) Flying Lizard Motorsports**	**(Germany) Jörg Bergmeister (Germany) Wolf Henzler (Germany) Marc Lieb**	**Porsche 997 GT3-RSR**	MI	**314**
12	**GT2**	**45**	**(United States) Flying Lizard Motorsports**	**(Germany) Jörg Bergmeister (Germany) Wolf Henzler (Germany) Marc Lieb**	**Porsche 3.8 L Flat-6**	MI	**314**
13	GT2	44	(United States) Flying Lizard Motorsports 44	(United States) Darren Law (United States) Seth Neiman (Australia) Alex Davison	Porsche 997 GT3-RSR	MI	311
13	GT2	44	(United States) Flying Lizard Motorsports 44	(United States) Darren Law (United States) Seth Neiman (Australia) Alex Davison	Porsche 3.8 L Flat-6	MI	311
14	GT2	61	(United States) Risi Competizione (United States) Krohn Racing	(United States) Tracy Krohn (Sweden) Niclas Jönsson (Belgium) Eric van de Poele	Ferrari F430GT	MI	308
14	GT2	61	(United States) Risi Competizione (United States) Krohn Racing	(United States) Tracy Krohn (Sweden) Niclas Jönsson (Belgium) Eric van de Poele	Ferrari 4.0 L V8	MI	308
15	GT2	73	(United States) Tafel Racing	(United States) Jim Tafel (Germany) Pierre Ehret (Denmark) Allan Simonsen	Ferrari F430GT	MI	305
15	GT2	73	(United States) Tafel Racing	(United States) Jim Tafel (Germany) Pierre Ehret (Denmark) Allan Simonsen	Ferrari 4.0 L V8	MI	305
16	GT1	008	(United States) Bell Motorsports	(United States) Terry Borcheller (United States) Chapman Ducote (Spain) Antonio García	Aston Martin DBR9	D	299
16	GT1	008	(United States) Bell Motorsports	(United States) Terry Borcheller (United States) Chapman Ducote (Spain) Antonio García	Aston Martin 6.0 L V12	D	299
17	GT2	11	(United States) Primetime Race Group	(United States) Joel Feinberg (United States) Chris Hall	Dodge Viper Competition Coupe	MI	295
17	GT2	11	(United States) Primetime Race Group	(United States) Joel Feinberg (United States) Chris Hall	Dodge 8.3 L V10	MI	295
18 DNF	LMP2	26	(United States) Andretti Green Racing	(United States) Marco Andretti (United States) Bryan Herta (Brazil) Christian Fittipaldi	Acura ARX-01B	MI	287
18 DNF	LMP2	26	(United States) Andretti Green Racing	(United States) Marco Andretti (United States) Bryan Herta (Brazil) Christian Fittipaldi	Acura AL7R 3.4 L V8	MI	287
19	GT2	5	(Germany) VICI Racing	(Germany) Uwe Alzen (United States) Craig Stanton (United States) Nathan Swartzbaugh	Porsche 997 GT3-RSR	KU	286
19	GT2	5	(Germany) VICI Racing	(Germany) Uwe Alzen (United States) Craig Stanton (United States) Nathan Swartzbaugh	Porsche 3.8 L Flat-6	KU	286
20	GT2	71	(United States) Tafel Racing	(Germany) Dominik Farnbacher (Germany) Dirk Müller (United Kingdom) Rob Bell	Ferrari F430GT	MI	280
20	GT2	71	(United States) Tafel Racing	(Germany) Dominik Farnbacher (Germany) Dirk Müller (United Kingdom) Rob Bell	Ferrari 4.0 L V8	MI	280
21	GT2	46	(United States) Flying Lizard Motorsports	(United States) Johannes van Overbeek (France) Patrick Pilet (Austria) Richard Lietz	Porsche 997 GT3-RSR	MI	280
21	GT2	46	(United States) Flying Lizard Motorsports	(United States) Johannes van Overbeek (France) Patrick Pilet (Austria) Richard Lietz	Porsche 3.8 L Flat-6	MI	280
22 DNF	LMP1	12	(United States) Autocon Motorsports	(United States) Chris McMurry (United States) Bryan Willman (Canada) Tony Burgess	Creation CA07	D	250
22 DNF	LMP1	12	(United States) Autocon Motorsports	(United States) Chris McMurry (United States) Bryan Willman (Canada) Tony Burgess	Judd GV5 5.0 L V10	D	250
23 DNF	GT2	21	(United States) Panoz Team PTG	(United States) Joey Hand (United States) Tommy Milner (United States) Tom Sutherland	Panoz Esperante GT-LM	Y	200
23 DNF	GT2	21	(United States) Panoz Team PTG	(United States) Joey Hand (United States) Tommy Milner (United States) Tom Sutherland	Ford (Élan) 5.0 L V8	Y	200
24 DNF	GT2	40	(United States) Robertson Racing	(United States) David Robertson (United States) Andrea Robertson (United States) David Murry	Ford GT-R Mk.VII	D	186
24 DNF	GT2	40	(United States) Robertson Racing	(United States) David Robertson (United States) Andrea Robertson (United States) David Murry	Ford 5.0 L V8	D	186
25 DNF	GT2	77	(Slovakia) Autoracing Club Bratislava	(Slovakia) Miro Konôpka (Slovakia) Miro Hornak (Italy) Mauro Casadei	Porsche 911 GT3-RS	D	173
25 DNF	GT2	77	(Slovakia) Autoracing Club Bratislava	(Slovakia) Miro Konôpka (Slovakia) Miro Hornak (Italy) Mauro Casadei	Porsche 3.6 L Flat-6	D	173
26 DNF	GT2	62	(United States) Risi Competizione	(Brazil) Jaime Melo (Finland) Mika Salo (Italy) Gianmaria Bruni	Ferrari F430GT	MI	137
26 DNF	GT2	62	(United States) Risi Competizione	(Brazil) Jaime Melo (Finland) Mika Salo (Italy) Gianmaria Bruni	Ferrari 4.0 L V8	MI	137
27 DNF	GT2	87	(United States) Farnbacher-Loles Motorsports	(Germany) Marc Basseng (Germany) Dirk Werner (United States) Bryce Miller	Porsche 997 GT3-RSR	MI	136
27 DNF	GT2	87	(United States) Farnbacher-Loles Motorsports	(Germany) Marc Basseng (Germany) Dirk Werner (United States) Bryce Miller	Porsche 3.8 L Flat-6	MI	136
28 DNF	GT2	28	(United States) LG Motorsports	(United States) Lou Gigliotti (United States) Doug Peterson (Belgium) Marc Goossens	Chevrolet Corvette C6	KU	99
28 DNF	GT2	28	(United States) LG Motorsports	(United States) Lou Gigliotti (United States) Doug Peterson (Belgium) Marc Goossens	Chevrolet LS3 6.0 L V8	KU	99
29 DNF	LMP2	32	(France) Barazi-Epsilon	(Denmark) Juan Barazi (Netherlands) Michael Vergers (France) Jean-Christophe Ravier	Zytek 07S/2	MI	88
29 DNF	LMP2	32	(France) Barazi-Epsilon	(Denmark) Juan Barazi (Netherlands) Michael Vergers (France) Jean-Christophe Ravier	Zytek ZG348 3.4 L V8	MI	88
30 DNF	GT2	007	(United Kingdom) Drayson-Barwell	(United Kingdom) Paul Drayson (United Kingdom) Jonny Cocker (United Kingdom) Tim Sugden	Aston Martin DBRS9	D	70
30 DNF	GT2	007	(United Kingdom) Drayson-Barwell	(United Kingdom) Paul Drayson (United Kingdom) Jonny Cocker (United Kingdom) Tim Sugden	Aston Martin 6.0 L V12 (E85 ethanol)	D	70
31 DNF	LMP2	6	(United States) Penske Racing	(United States) Patrick Long (Germany) Sascha Maassen (Australia) Ryan Briscoe	Porsche RS Spyder Evo	MI	29
31 DNF	LMP2	6	(United States) Penske Racing	(United States) Patrick Long (Germany) Sascha Maassen (Australia) Ryan Briscoe	Porsche MR6 3.4 L V8	MI	29
DSQ^{†}	LMP2	15	(Mexico) Lowe's Fernández Racing	(Mexico) Adrian Fernández (Mexico) Luis Diaz	Acura ARX-01B	MI	351
DSQ^{†}	LMP2	15	(Mexico) Lowe's Fernández Racing	(Mexico) Adrian Fernández (Mexico) Luis Diaz	Acura AL7R 3.4 L V8	MI	351
DNS	LMP2	8	(United States) B-K Motorsports	(United States) Gerardo Bonilla (United Kingdom) Ben Devlin (Brazil) Raphael Matos	Lola B07/46	Y	-
DNS	LMP2	8	(United States) B-K Motorsports	(United States) Gerardo Bonilla (United Kingdom) Ben Devlin (Brazil) Raphael Matos	Mazda MZR-R 2.0 L Turbo I4 (E85 ethanol)	Y	-
DNS	GT2	48	(United States) Corsa Motorsport	(United States) Gunnar Jeannette (United Kingdom) Johnny Mowlem (Germany) Ralf Kelleners	Ferrari F430GT	HK	-
DNS	GT2	48	(United States) Corsa Motorsport	(United States) Gunnar Jeannette (United Kingdom) Johnny Mowlem (Germany) Ralf Kelleners	Ferrari 4.0 L V8	HK	-

† - #15 Fernández Racing was disqualified from the race results after the car failed post-race inspection. The car's airbox was found to have been broken, allowing an excess of air into the engine.

== Statistics ==
- Pole Position - #1 Audi Sport North America - 1:43.195
- Fastest Lap - #07 Peugeot Sport Total - 1:44.536

American Le Mans Series
Previous race: None	2008 season	Next race: 2008 Sports Car Challenge of St. Petersburg
