= Highcroft Racing =

Defunct Sports Car Racing team

(United States) Highcroft Racing
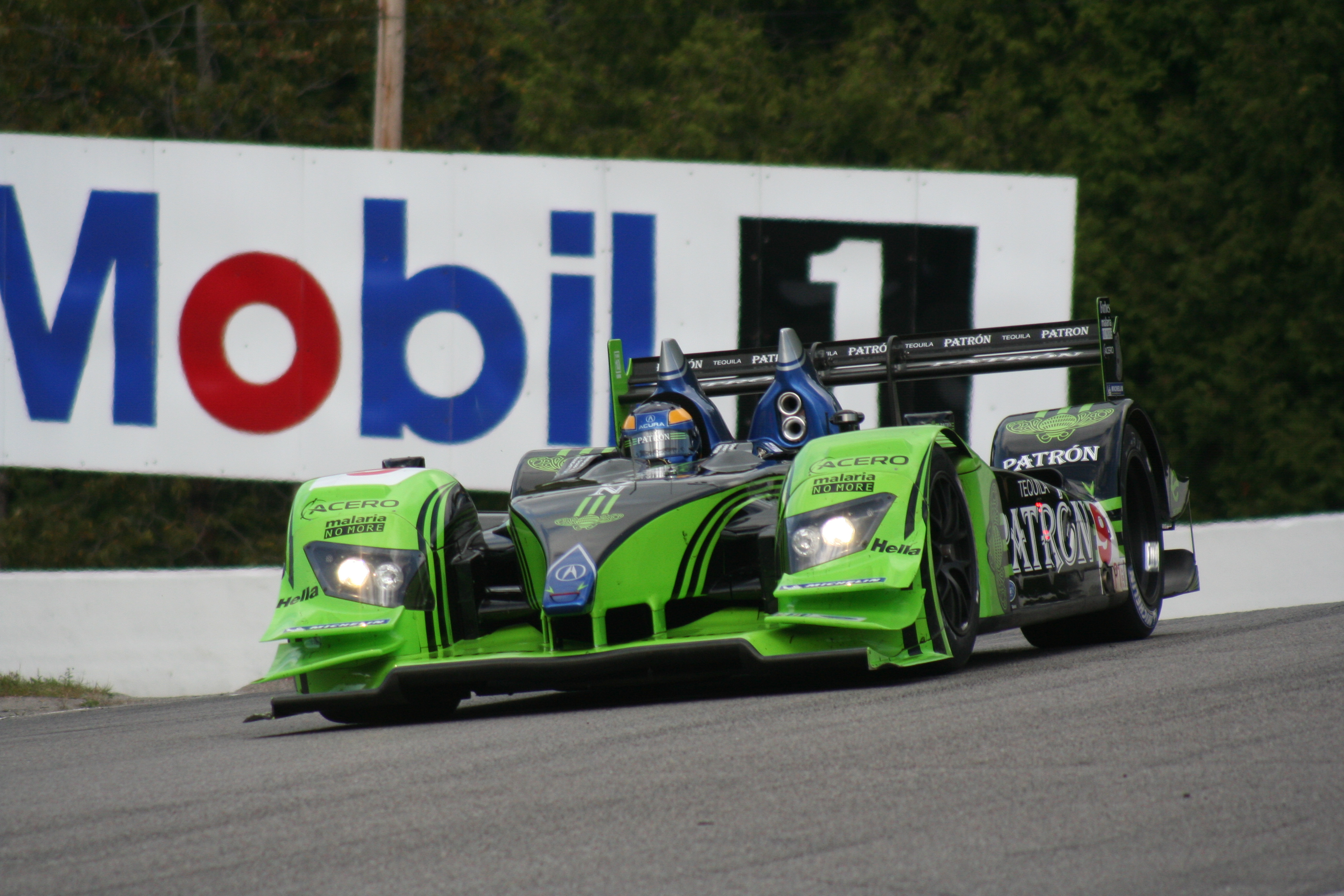
- Founded: 1989
- Team principal(s): Duncan Dayton
- Current series: Historic motorsport
- Former series: Formula Ford; American Le Mans Series
- Noted drivers: (Australia) David Brabham (France) Simon Pagenaud (United States) Scott Sharp (United Kingdom) Dario Franchitti (United Kingdom) Marino Franchitti (Sweden) Stefan Johansson (United Kingdom) Andy Wallace (Mexico) Memo Gidley (Germany) Michael Krumm (Japan) Satoshi Motoyama (Brazil) Vítor Meira (United Kingdom) Robbie Kerr
- Teams' Championships: 2 (2009 ALMS, 2010 ALMS)
- Drivers' Championships: 2 (2009 ALMS, 2010 ALMS)

Highcroft Racing was an American auto racing team based out of Danbury, Connecticut and founded by driver Duncan Dayton in 1989. Initially founded for Dayton's involvement in historic motorsport, specifically the restoration and preparation of classic automobiles, the team was expanded for Dayton's entry into the USAC Formula Ford 2000 series in 1994. The team entered a partnership with Intersport Racing in 2003 and entered the American Le Mans Series (ALMS).

Highcroft Racing last competed in 2012, and has since ceased operations. In the spring of 2015, the building that housed their headquarters near the Danbury, CT Airport was sold for $8.2 million.

== Racing history ==
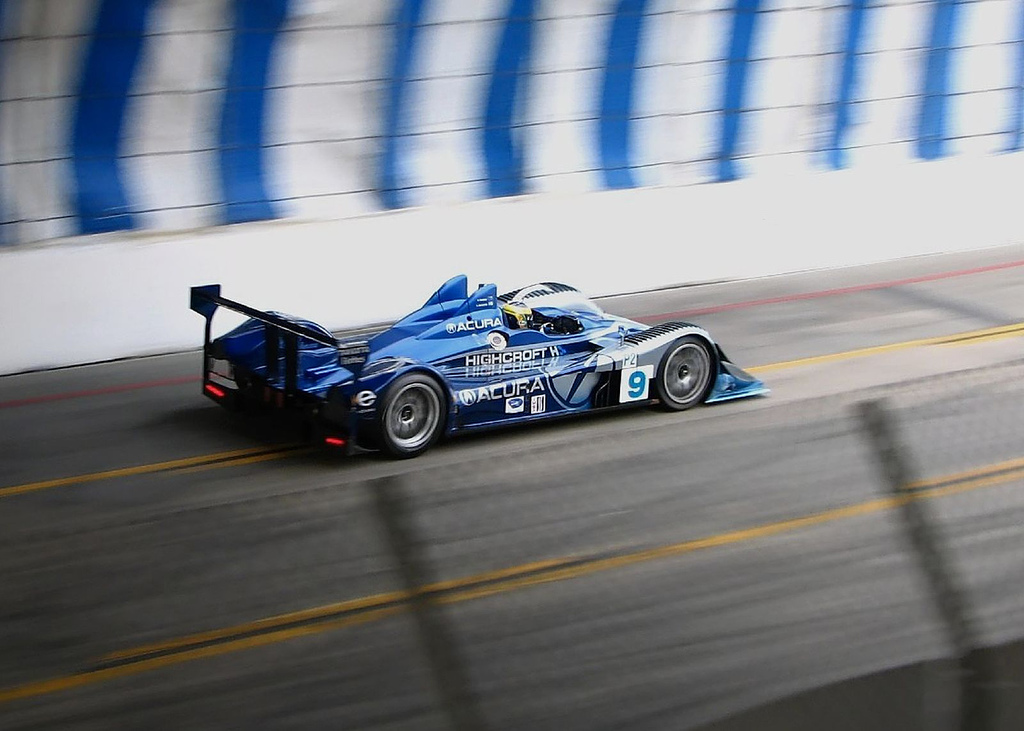
Highcroft Racing at Long Beach.

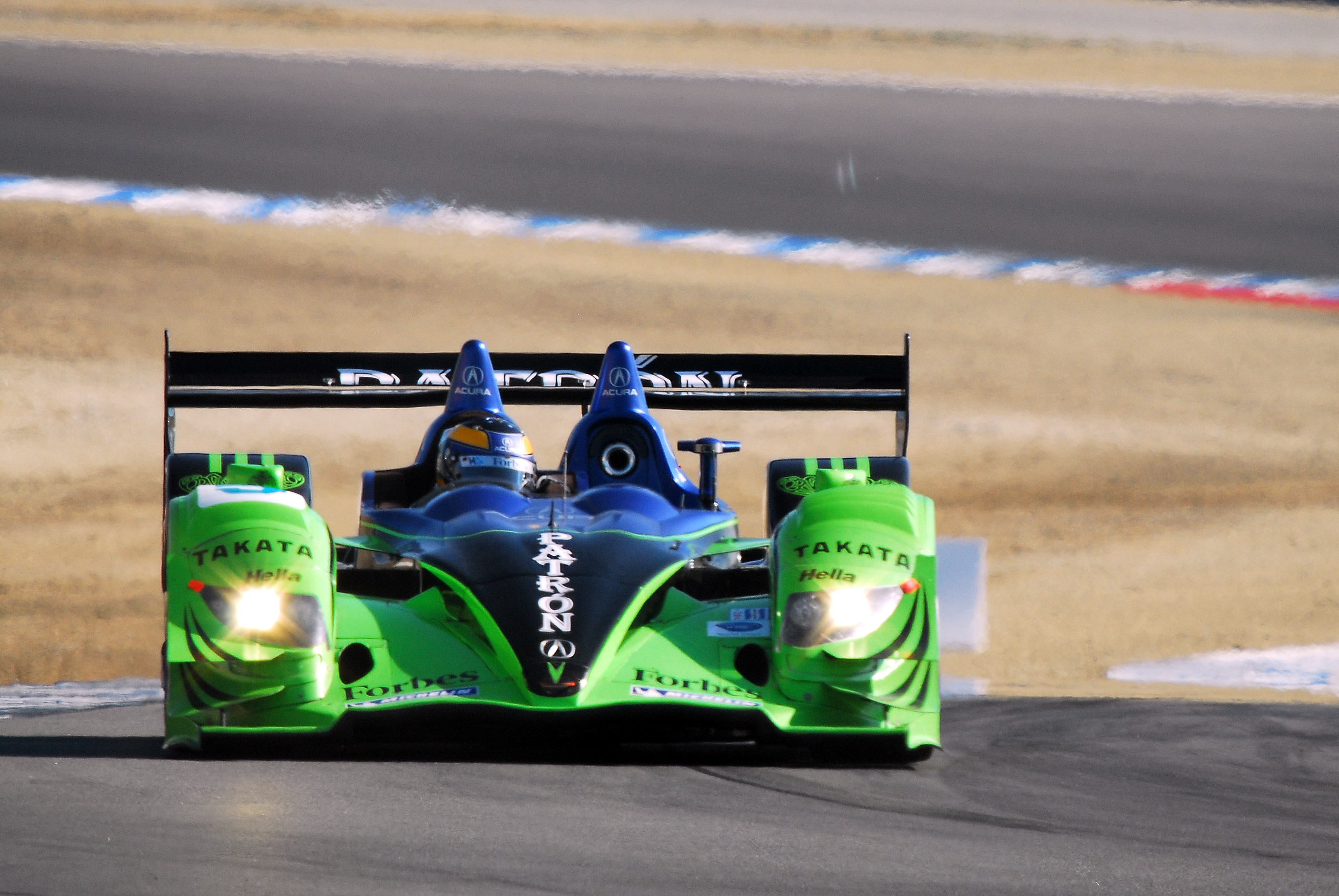
Highcroft Racing At Laguna Seca.

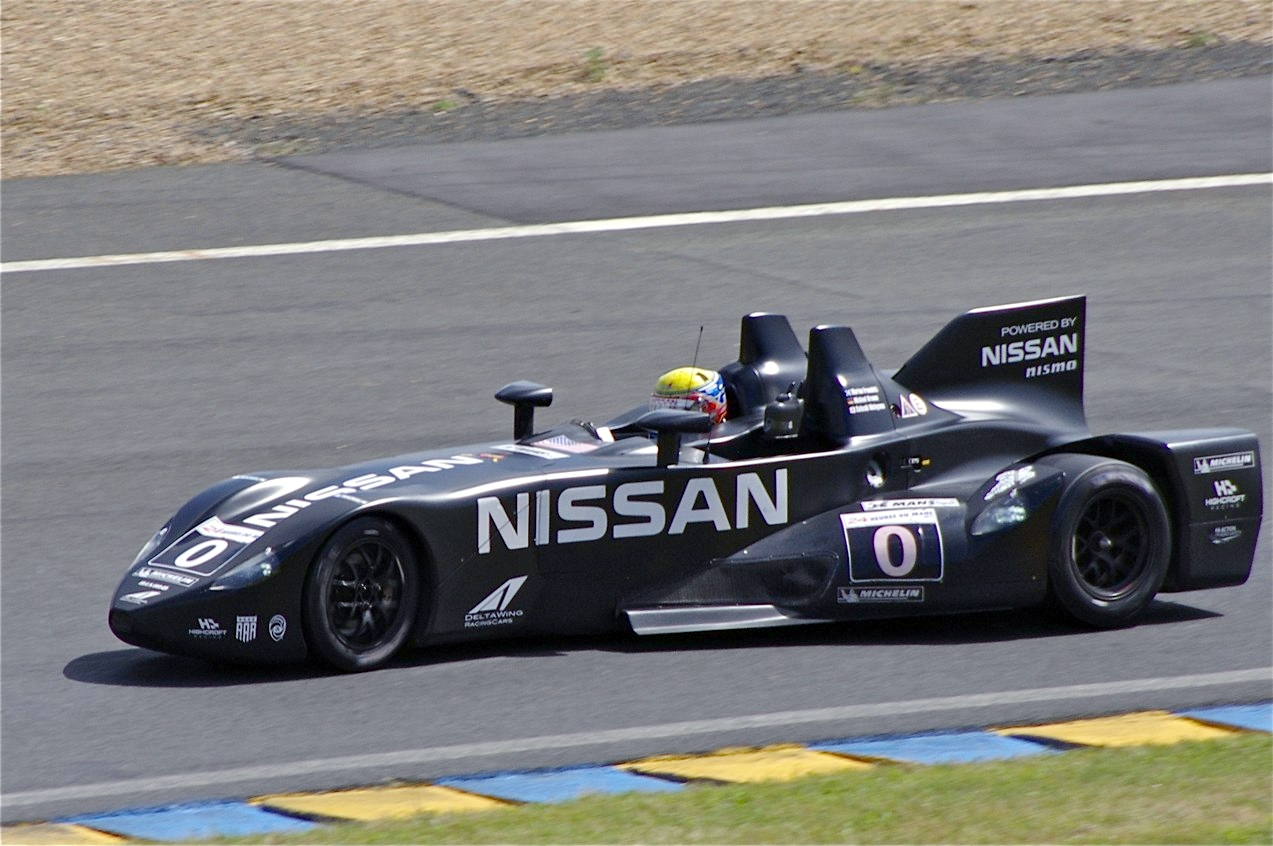
The DeltaWing at the 2012 24 Hours of Le Mans.

=== 2006 (Lola) ===
In 2006 Highcroft purchased an MG-Lola EX257 from Dyson Racing and started their own ALMS team. They entered four races including Petit Le Mans where the team scored a third-place finish. The team ended the season 4th in the LMP1 Team Championship.

=== 2007–2011 (HPD) ===
For 2007, the team was chosen by Honda Performance Development (HPD) to run one of three Acura ARX-01s for Acura's debut in the ALMS. Drivers David Brabham and Stefan Johansson would compete for the full season. The team's best result came at Road America where they finished third in class. Highcroft Racing finished the season 3rd in the LMP2 Championship behind the two Porsche teams of Penske Racing and Dyson Racing but the most successful of the Acura teams. David Brabham and Stefan Johansson finished 5th in the Drivers Championship.

For 2008, the team continued their campaign of the Acura ARX-01. The team also earned title sponsorship from Patrón Tequila for a three-year contract. Scott Sharp joined the team to replace Stefan Johansson as David Brabhams co-driver. Over the season, the team gained 3 class finishes as well as an overall finish at Lime Rock Park, giving Acura its first overall victory. The team finished the season 2nd in the LMP2 championship behind Penske Racing, but was, once again, the most successful of the Acura teams. Drivers Scott Sharp and David Brabham also finished 2nd in the Team Championship.

Highcroft was one of two teams chosen to campaign Acura's new LMP1 car. Highcroft and De Ferran Motorsports would compete with the Acura ARX-02a during the 2009 American Le Mans Series season. Due to the absence of Audi Sport North America, the team's main competition was De Ferran Motorsports. The team claimed victories at St. Petersburg, Road America and Mosport. Although winning fewer races throughout the season, Highcroft Racing scored more season long points than De Ferran Motorsports and claimed the LMP1 Championship. Scott Sharp and David Brabham also claimed the LMP1 Drivers Championship.

The 2010 season saw the LMP1 and LMP2 classes combine to form a new, performance balanced, LMP class. Scott Sharp left Highcroft Racing at the end of the 2009 season in order to start his own team with Patrón CEO, Ed Brown. De Ferran Motorsport's Simon Pagenaud was signed to be Brabham's co-driver. The team returned to the LMP2-spec Acura, now rebadged HPD after having season long troubles with the Acura ARX-02a. Highcroft earned four race victories and a podium finish at every other race of the season. The team's consistent performance won Highcroft its second consecutive Team and Drivers Championship.

In 2010, Highcroft Racing made their debut in the 24 Hours of Le Mans using the HPD ARX-01c they competed with in the American Le Mans Series. Due to French Liquor Laws, the team were unable to display their primary sponsor, Patrón Tequila, on the car. They instead chose to represent their charitable partner, Malaria No More. Drivers David Brabham, Marino Franchitti, and Marco Werner qualified 2nd in class, behind Strakka Racing, the second HPD team. The team completed 296 laps and finished 9th in the LMP2 class.

For 2011, Highcroft Racing intended to compete in the full American Le Mans Series season as well as the 24 Hours of Le Mans with the new HPD ARX-01e LMP1 car. The team started the year at the Mobil 1 12 Hours of Sebring where they took delivery of their new car only a week before the race. David Brabham, Simon Pagenaud and Marino Franchitti qualified 7th in class but were able to finish 2nd overall, completing 332 laps. On May 16, Highcroft Racing and HPD announced that its partnership would come to an end. Due to the impact of the tsunami on Japan and on Honda, the team withdrew its entry in the 2011 24 Hours of Le Mans and would not compete in the rest of the American Le Mans Series season due to lack of funding.

=== 2012 (DeltaWing) ===
In 2012, Highcroft Racing teamed with Ben Bowlby and All American Racers to build, develop and race the new DeltaWing, an experimental racing car. The car was designed to reduce aerodynamic drag dramatically allowing for quicker straight and cornering speeds while using half as much power and half as much weight. Despite skepticism over the project, the DeltaWing made its debut in the 2012 24 Hours of Le Mans, filling the 56th garage reserved for experimental vehicles. Marino Franchitti, Michael Krumm and Satoshi Motoyama qualified 29th with a time of 3:42.612, which was 18.825 behind the lead car. The car was retired after 75 laps following an accident in which the DeltaWing ran into a concrete barrier at the Porsche Curves after a collision with Kazuki Nakajima's Toyota TS030 Hybrid. The DeltaWing recorded a best race lap time of 3:45.737, rivaling some of the LMP2 teams. Nakajima later apologized for the incident. The team also competed at Petit Le Mans, the final round of the ALMS season, as an unclassified entry. The team set out to finish the race, something they hadn't done at Le Mans earlier in the year. After rebuilding the car from a collision in practice, the team went on to finish 5th overall, completing 388 laps; just 6 laps behind the overall leader.

== Racing record ==
=== 24 Hours of Le Mans results ===
| Year | Entrant | No. | Car | Drivers | Class | Laps | Pos. | Class Pos. |
|---|---|---|---|---|---|---|---|---|
| 2010 | (United States) Highcroft Racing | 26 | HPD ARX-01C | (Australia) David Brabham (United Kingdom) Marino Franchitti (Germany) Marco Werner | LMP2 | 296 | 25th | 9th |
| 2012 | (United States) Highcroft Racing | 0 | DeltaWing-Nissan | (United Kingdom) Marino Franchitti (Germany) Michael Krumm (Japan) Satoshi Motoyama | CDNT | 75 | DNF | DNF |

== Drivers ==
=== ALMS (2006–2011) ===
(Australia) David Brabham (2007–11)
(United States) Duncan Dayton (2006, 2007 Sebring)
(United Kingdom) Dario Franchitti (2009 Sebring, Petit Le Mans)
(United Kingdom) Marino Franchitti (2010 Sebring, Petit Le Mans)
(Mexico) Memo Gidley (2006 Petit Le Mans)
(Sweden) Stefan Johansson (2007, 2008 Sebring)
(United Kingdom) Robbie Kerr (2007 Petit Le Mans)
(Brazil) Vítor Meira (2006 Petit Le Mans)
(France) Simon Pagenaud (2010–11)
(United States) Scott Sharp (2008–09)
(United Kingdom) Andy Wallace (2006)

=== DeltaWing (2012) ===
(United Kingdom) Marino Franchitti
(Germany) Michael Krumm
(Japan) Satoshi Motoyama
