= Marco Werner =

German racing driver (born 1966)

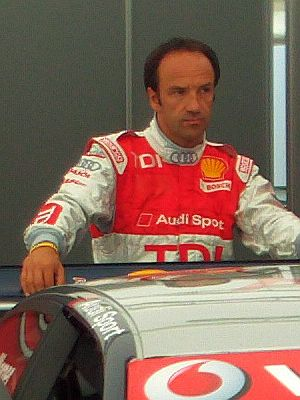
- Werner in 2007
- Nationality: (Germany) German
- Born: 27 April 1966 (age 60); Dortmund, West Germany

24 Hours of Le Mans career
- Years: 2002–2010
- Teams: Audi Sport Joest, Audi Sport Goh, Champion Racing, Highcroft Racing
- Best finish: 1st (2005, 2006, 2007)
- Class wins: 3 (2005, 2006, 2007)

Marco Werner (born 27 April 1966) is a professional racer from Germany. Born in Dortmund, he was the eighth driver to complete the informal triple crown in endurance racing. In his early career, Werner finished runner-up in the Formula Opel Euroseries in 1989 and runner-up in the German F3 series in 1991 behind Tom Kristensen. Having failed to graduate to Formula One, Werner switched to sports car racing and touring car racing. Werner was a regular driver in the STW and Porsche Supercup during the 1990s, but he found more success in the 24 Hours of Daytona, which he won in 1995 in a Kremer-Porsche.

In 2001, Werner joined Audi Sport Team Joest, and became a regular driver in the American Le Mans Series. Werner won the 24 Hours of Le Mans in 2005 with an Audi R8, and in 2006 and 2007 with an Audi R10. In 2008, he co-drove the Audi R10 in the American Le Mans Series with Lucas Luhr to six overall victories and eight class wins, taking the LMP1 drivers title. After his last 24 Hours of Le Mans participation in 2010, Werner became a regular participant in historic racing, winning the 2022 Historic Grand Prix of Monaco Série G race (for 3-litre Formula One cars from 1981 to 1985), in a Lotus 87B.

== Racing record ==
=== Complete Deutsche Tourenwagen Meisterschaft/Masters results ===
(key) (Races in bold indicate pole position) (Races in italics indicate fastest lap)

Year	Team	Car	1	2	3	4	5	6	7	8	9	10	11	12	13	14	15	16	17	18	19	20	21	22	Pos.	Pts
1993	Dürkop Eurorent GmbH	Opel Astra GSi 16V Sedan	ZOL; 1 Ret	ZOL; 2 DNS	HOC; 1 Ret	HOC; 2 DNS	NÜR; 1	NÜR; 2	WUN; 1	WUN; 2	NÜR; 1 Ret	NÜR; 2 DNS	NOR; 1	NOR; 2	DON; 1	DON; 2	DIE; 1	DIE; 2							20th	1
1993	Linder Rennsport	BMW M3 Sport Evo																	ALE; 1 Ret	ALE; 2 DNS	AVU; 1	AVU; 2			20th	1
1993	Kissling Motorsport	Opel Omega 3000 24V Evo																					HOC; 1; 11	HOC; 2; 10	20th	1
2007	Team Phoenix	Audi A4 DTM 2006	HOC	OSC; 15	LAU	BRH	NOR	MUG	ZAN	NÜR	CAT	HOC													22nd	0

=== Complete Super Tourenwagen Cup results ===
(key) (Races in bold indicate pole position) (Races in italics indicate fastest lap)

Year	Team	Car	1	2	3	4	5	6	7	8	9	10	11	12	13	14	15	16	17	18	19	20	Pos.	Pts
1994	Lauderbach Motorsport	Opel Astra	AVU; 14	WUN; Ret	ZOL; 10	ZAN; 8	ÖST; 15	SAL; DNS	SPA; 14	NÜR; 13													19th	4
1995	AM-Holzer Motorsport	BMW 318is	ZOL; 1	ZOL; 2	SPA; 1	SPA; 2	ÖST; 1	ÖST; 2	HOC; 1	HOC; 2	NÜR; 1	NÜR; 2	SAL; 1	SAL; 2	AVU; 1	AVU; 2	NÜR; 1; 16	NÜR; 2; 11					30th	25
1996	Opel-Häusler Team Holzer	Opel Vectra	ZOL; 1 Ret	ZOL; 2 DNS	ASS; 1 Ret	ASS; 2; 9	HOC; 1; 11	HOC; 2; 9	SAC; 1; 8	SAC; 2; 7	WUN; 1; 6	WUN; 2; 5	ZWE; 1 Ret	ZWE; 2 Ret	SAL; 1 Ret	SAL; 2 DNS	AVU; 1; 3	AVU; 2; 8	NÜR; 1; 9	NÜR; 2; 6			10th	234
1997	Team Honda Sport	Honda Accord	HOC; 1; 6	HOC; 2; 5	ZOL; 1; 30	ZOL; 2; 25	NÜR; 1; 2	NÜR; 2; 3	SAC; 1 Ret	SAC; 2 DNS	NOR; 1; 8	NOR; 2; 10	WUN; 1; 5	WUN; 2; 17	ZWE; 1 Ret	ZWE; 2 Ret	SAL; 1; 10	SAL; 2; 16	REG; 1; 9	REG; 2 Ret	NÜR; 1; 14	NÜR; 2 Ret	19th	170

=== Complete 24 Hours of Le Mans results ===
Year	Team	Co-Drivers	Car	Class	Laps	Pos.	Class Pos.
2002	(Germany) Audi Sport Team Joest	(Germany) Michael Krumm (Austria) Philipp Peter	Audi R8	LMP900	372	**3rd**	**3rd**
2003	Audi Sport Japan Team Goh	(Japan) Seiji Ara (Denmark) Jan Magnussen	Audi R8	LMP900	370	4th	**2nd**
2004	(United States) ADT Champion Racing	(Finland) JJ Lehto (Italy) Emanuele Pirro	Audi R8	LMP1	368	**3rd**	**3rd**
2005	(United States) ADT Champion Racing	(Denmark) Tom Kristensen (Finland) JJ Lehto	Audi R8	LMP1	370	**1st**	**1st**
2006	(Germany) Audi Sport Team Joest	(Germany) Frank Biela (Italy) Emanuele Pirro	Audi R10 TDI	LMP1	380	**1st**	**1st**
2007	(Germany) Audi Sport North America	(Germany) Frank Biela (Italy) Emanuele Pirro	Audi R10 TDI	LMP1	369	**1st**	**1st**
2008	(Germany) Audi Sport North America	(Germany) Frank Biela (Italy) Emanuele Pirro	Audi R10 TDI	LMP1	367	6th	6th
2009	(Germany) Audi Sport North America	(Germany) Lucas Luhr (Germany) Mike Rockenfeller	Audi R15 TDI	LMP1	104	DNF	DNF
2010	(United States) Highcroft Racing	(Australia) David Brabham (United Kingdom) Marino Franchitti	HPD ARX-01C	LMP2	296	25th	9th

=== Complete 12 Hours of Sebring results ===
Year	Team	Co-Drivers	Car	Class	Laps	Pos.	Class Pos.	Ref
2003	(Germany) Infineon Team Joest	(Germany) Frank Biela (Austria) Philipp Peter	Audi R8	LMP900	367	**1st**	**1st**	
2004	(United States) ADT Champion Racing	(Italy) Emanuele Pirro (Finland) JJ Lehto	Audi R8	LMP1	345	**2nd**	**2nd**	
2005	(United States) ADT Champion Racing	(Finland) JJ Lehto (Denmark) Tom Kristensen	Audi R8	LMP1	361	**1st**	**1st**	
2006	(United States) Audi Sport North America	(Germany) Frank Biela (Italy) Emanuele Pirro	Audi R10 TDI	LMP1	117	DNF	DNF	
2007	(United States) Audi Sport North America	(Italy) Emanuele Pirro (Germany) Frank Biela	Audi R10 TDI	LMP1	364	**1st**	**1st**	
2008	(United States) Audi Sport North America	(Germany) Lucas Luhr (Germany) Mike Rockenfeller	Audi R10 TDI	LMP1	333	6th	**2nd**	
2009	(Germany) Audi Sport Team Joest	(Germany) Lucas Luhr (Germany) Mike Rockenfeller	Audi R15 TDI	LMP1	381	**3rd**	**3rd**	

Sporting positions
Preceded by Jörg Müller	Monaco Formula Three; Race Winner; 1992	Succeeded by Gianantonio Pacchioni
Preceded by Tom Kristensen	American Le Mans Series champion 2003 with Frank Biela	Succeeded by Marco Werner; J.J. Lehto
Preceded by Frank Biela; Marco Werner	American Le Mans Series champion 2004 with: J.J. Lehto	Succeeded by Frank Biela; Emanuele Pirro
Preceded by Seiji Ara; Tom Kristensen; Rinaldo Capello	Winner of the 24 Hours of Le Mans; 2005 with: JJ Lehto; Tom Kristensen	Succeeded by Frank Biela; Emanuele Pirro; Marco Werner
Preceded by JJ Lehto; Marco Werner; Tom Kristensen	Winner of the 24 Hours of Le Mans; 2006 with: Frank Biela; Emanuele Pirro	Succeeded by Frank Biela; Emanuele Pirro; Marco Werner
Preceded by Frank Biela; Emanuele Pirro; Marco Werner	Winner of the 24 Hours of Le Mans; 2007 with: Frank Biela; Emanuele Pirro	Succeeded by Allan McNish; Rinaldo Capello; Tom Kristensen
Preceded by Allan McNish; Rinaldo Capello	American Le Mans Series champion 2008 with Lucas Luhr	Succeeded by David Brabham; Scott Sharp
