= 2010 Monterey Sports Car Championships =

Track map of Mazda Raceway Laguna Seca

The 2010 American Le Mans Series Monterey presented by Patron was held at Mazda Raceway Laguna Seca during May 20–22, 2010. It was the third round of the 2010 American Le Mans Series season. The 2010 race will be the first time that the race is 6 hours, extending into the darkness for the first time.

== Qualifying ==
The qualifying session saw Guy Smith give Dyson Racing the overall pole. Johnny Mowlem took LMPC pole for PR1/Mathiasen Motorsports, Jaime Melo took the GT pole for Risi and reigning Porsche Supercup champion Jeroen Bleekemolen took GTC pole for Black Swan Racing.

=== Qualifying result ===
Pole position winners in each class are marked in bold.

| Pos | Class | Team | Driver | Lap Time | Grid |
|---|---|---|---|---|---|
| 1 | **LMP** | **#16 Dyson Racing Team** | **Guy Smith** | **1:12.338** | **1** |
| 2 | LMP | #1 Patrón Highcroft Racing | David Brabham | 1:13.009 | 35 |
| 3 | LMP | #6 Muscle Milk Team Cytosport | Klaus Graf | 1:13.855 | 2 |
| 4 | LMP | #37 Intersport Racing | Clint Field | 1:15.208 | 3 |
| 5 | LMP | #12 Autocon Motorsports | Pierre Ehret | 1:15.775 | 4 |
| 6 | LMP | #8 Drayson Racing | Paul Drayson | 1:16.297 | 5 |
| 7 | **LMPC** | **#52 PR1/Mathiasen Motorsports** | **Johnny Mowlem** | **1:17.800** | **6** |
| 8 | LMPC | #99 Green Earth Team Gunnar | Gunnar Jeannette | 1:17.971 | 7 |
| 9 | LMPC | #55 Level 5 Motorsports | Christophe Bouchut | 1:18.212 | 8 |
| 10 | LMPC | #36 Genoa Racing | Tom Sutherland | 1:18.256 | 9 |
| 11 | LMPC | #95 Level 5 Motorsports | Scott Tucker | 1:21.221 | 10 |
| 12 | LMPC | #89 Intersport Racing | Mitch Pagerey | 1:21.446 | 11 |
| 13 | **GT** | **#62 Risi Competizione** | **Jaime Melo** | **1:22.752** | **12** |
| 14 | GT | #01 Extreme Speed Motorsports | Johannes van Overbeek | 1:23.067 | 13 |
| 15 | GT | #4 Corvette Racing | Oliver Gavin | 1:23.101 | 14 |
| 16 | GT | #3 Corvette Racing | Jan Magnussen | 1:23.201 | 15 |
| 17 | GT | #92 BMW Rahal Letterman Racing | Bill Auberlen | 1:23.350 | 16 |
| 18 | GT | #90 BMW Rahal Letterman Racing | Dirk Müller | 1:23.379 | 17 |
| 19 | GT | #02 Extreme Speed Motorsports | Guy Cosmo | 1:23.394 | 18 |
| 20 | GT | #45 Flying Lizard Motorsports | Jörg Bergmeister | 1:23.484 | 19 |
| 21 | GT | #17 Team Falken Tire | Wolf Henzler | 1:23.991 | 20 |
| 22 | GT | #40 Robertson Racing | David Murry | 1:24.750 | 21 |
| 23 | GT | #75 Jaguar RSR | Ryan Dalziel | 1:26.381 | 22 |
| 24 | GT | #61 Risi Competizione | Tracy Krohn | 1:26.708 | 23 |
| 25 | **GTC** | **#54 Black Swan Racing** | **Jeroen Bleekemolen** | **1:26.934** | **24** |
| 26 | GTC | #81 Alex Job Racing | Butch Leitzinger | 1:27.603 | 25 |
| 27 | GTC | #63 TRG | Andy Lally | 1:27.797 | 26 |
| 28 | GTC | #88 Velox Motorsports | Shane Lewis | 1:27.950 | 27 |
| 29 | GTC | #48 Orbit Racing | Bryce Miller | 1:28.126 | 28 |
| 30 | GTC | #32 GMG Racing | James Sofronas | 1:28.171 | 29 |
| 31 | GT | #44 Flying Lizard Motorsports | Seth Neiman | 1:28.481 | 30 |
| 32 | GTC | #69 WERKS II Racing | Galen Bieker | 1:28.590 | 31 |
| 33 | GTC | #23 Alex Job Racing | Bill Sweedler | 1:29.360 | 32 |
| 34 | GTC | #80 Car Amigo - AJR | Ricardo González | 1:29.547 | 33 |
| 35 | GTC | #28 911 Design | Doug Baron | 1:29.701 | 34 |

== Race ==
=== Race result ===
Class winners in bold. Cars failing to complete 70% of their class winner's distance are marked as Not Classified (NC).

| Pos | Class | No | Team | Drivers | Chassis | Tire | Laps |
| Pos | Class | No | Team | Drivers | Engine | Tire | Laps |
|---|---|---|---|---|---|---|---|
| 1 | **LMP** | **1** | **(United States) Patrón Highcroft Racing** | **(Australia) David Brabham (France) Simon Pagenaud (United Kingdom) Marino Franchitti** | **HPD ARX-01C** | M | **237** |
| 1 | **LMP** | **1** | **(United States) Patrón Highcroft Racing** | **(Australia) David Brabham (France) Simon Pagenaud (United Kingdom) Marino Franchitti** | **HPD 3.4 L V8** | M | **237** |
| 2 | LMP | 6 | (United States) Muscle Milk Team Cytosport | (United States) Memo Gidley (Germany) Klaus Graf (Germany) Sascha Maassen | Porsche RS Spyder Evo | M | 230 |
| 2 | LMP | 6 | (United States) Muscle Milk Team Cytosport | (United States) Memo Gidley (Germany) Klaus Graf (Germany) Sascha Maassen | Porsche MR6 3.4 L V8 | M | 230 |
| 3 | **LMPC** | **55** | **(United States) Level 5 Motorsports** | **(United States) Scott Tucker (France) Christophe Bouchut (Canada) Mark Wilkins** | **Oreca FLM09** | M | **229** |
| 3 | **LMPC** | **55** | **(United States) Level 5 Motorsports** | **(United States) Scott Tucker (France) Christophe Bouchut (Canada) Mark Wilkins** | Chevrolet LS3 6.2 L V8 | M | **229** |
| 4 | LMPC | 36 | (United States) Genoa Racing | (United States) Tom Sutherland (United States) Tom Weickardt (Canada) Kyle Marcelli | Oreca FLM09 | M | 229 |
| 4 | LMPC | 36 | (United States) Genoa Racing | (United States) Tom Sutherland (United States) Tom Weickardt (Canada) Kyle Marcelli | Chevrolet LS3 6.2 L V8 | M | 229 |
| 5 | **GT** | **45** | **(United States) Flying Lizard Motorsports** | **(Germany) Jörg Bergmeister (United States) Patrick Long** | **Porsche 997 GT3-RSR** | M | **227** |
| 5 | **GT** | **45** | **(United States) Flying Lizard Motorsports** | **(Germany) Jörg Bergmeister (United States) Patrick Long** | **Porsche 4.0 L Flat-6** | M | **227** |
| 6 | GT | 90 | (United States) BMW Rahal Letterman Racing | (Germany) Dirk Müller (United States) Joey Hand | BMW M3 GT2 | D | 227 |
| 6 | GT | 90 | (United States) BMW Rahal Letterman Racing | (Germany) Dirk Müller (United States) Joey Hand | BMW 4.0 L V8 | D | 227 |
| 7 | GT | 4 | (United States) Corvette Racing | (Monaco) Olivier Beretta (United Kingdom) Oliver Gavin | Chevrolet Corvette C6.R | M | 227 |
| 7 | GT | 4 | (United States) Corvette Racing | (Monaco) Olivier Beretta (United Kingdom) Oliver Gavin | Chevrolet 5.5 L V8 | M | 227 |
| 8 | GT | 62 | (United States) Risi Competizione | (Brazil) Jaime Melo (Italy) Gianmaria Bruni | Ferrari F430 GTE | M | 225 |
| 8 | GT | 62 | (United States) Risi Competizione | (Brazil) Jaime Melo (Italy) Gianmaria Bruni | Ferrari 4.0 L V8 | M | 225 |
| 9 | GT | 01 | (United States) Extreme Speed Motorsports | (United States) Scott Sharp (United States) Johannes van Overbeek | Ferrari F430 GTE | M | 225 |
| 9 | GT | 01 | (United States) Extreme Speed Motorsports | (United States) Scott Sharp (United States) Johannes van Overbeek | Ferrari 4.0 L V8 | M | 225 |
| 10 | GT | 3 | (United States) Corvette Racing | (Denmark) Jan Magnussen (United States) Johnny O'Connell | Chevrolet Corvette C6.R | M | 224 |
| 10 | GT | 3 | (United States) Corvette Racing | (Denmark) Jan Magnussen (United States) Johnny O'Connell | Chevrolet 5.5 L V8 | M | 224 |
| 11 | GT | 17 | (United States) Team Falken Tire | (United States) Bryan Sellers (Germany) Wolf Henzler | Porsche 997 GT3-RSR | F | 224 |
| 11 | GT | 17 | (United States) Team Falken Tire | (United States) Bryan Sellers (Germany) Wolf Henzler | Porsche 4.0 L Flat-6 | F | 224 |
| 12 | LMPC | 99 | (United States) Green Earth Team Gunnar | (United States) Gunnar Jeannette (Germany) Christian Zugel (United States) Elton Julian | Oreca FLM09 | M | 222 |
| 12 | LMPC | 99 | (United States) Green Earth Team Gunnar | (United States) Gunnar Jeannette (Germany) Christian Zugel (United States) Elton Julian | Chevrolet LS3 6.2 L V8 | M | 222 |
| 13 | GT | 92 | (United States) BMW Rahal Letterman Racing | (United States) Bill Auberlen (United States) Tommy Milner | BMW M3 GT2 | D | 222 |
| 13 | GT | 92 | (United States) BMW Rahal Letterman Racing | (United States) Bill Auberlen (United States) Tommy Milner | BMW 4.0 L V8 | D | 222 |
| 14 | LMPC | 89 | (United States) Intersport Racing | (United States) Mitch Pagerey (United States) David Ducote (United States) Brian Wong | Oreca FLM09 | M | 222 |
| 14 | LMPC | 89 | (United States) Intersport Racing | (United States) Mitch Pagerey (United States) David Ducote (United States) Brian Wong | Chevrolet LS3 6.2 L V8 | M | 222 |
| 15 | LMP | 16 | (United States) Dyson Racing Team | (United States) Chris Dyson (United Kingdom) Guy Smith (United Kingdom) Andy Meyrick | Lola B09/86 | D | 220 |
| 15 | LMP | 16 | (United States) Dyson Racing Team | (United States) Chris Dyson (United Kingdom) Guy Smith (United Kingdom) Andy Meyrick | Mazda MZR-R 2.0 L Turbo I4 (Butanol) | D | 220 |
| 16 | GT | 61 | (United States) Risi Competizione (United States) Krohn Racing | (United States) Tracy Krohn (Sweden) Nic Jönsson | Ferrari F430 GTE | M | 220 |
| 16 | GT | 61 | (United States) Risi Competizione (United States) Krohn Racing | (United States) Tracy Krohn (Sweden) Nic Jönsson | Ferrari 4.0 L V8 | M | 220 |
| 17 | **GTC** | **54** | **(United States) Black Swan Racing** | **(United States) Tim Pappas (Netherlands) Jeroen Bleekemolen (Netherlands) Sebastiaan Bleekemolen** | **Porsche 997 GT3 Cup** | Y | **219** |
| 17 | **GTC** | **54** | **(United States) Black Swan Racing** | **(United States) Tim Pappas (Netherlands) Jeroen Bleekemolen (Netherlands) Sebastiaan Bleekemolen** | **Porsche 3.8 L Flat-6** | Y | **219** |
| 18 | GTC | 63 | (United States) TRG | (France) Henri Richard (United States) René Villeneuve (United States) Andy Lally | Porsche 997 GT3 Cup | Y | 218 |
| 18 | GTC | 63 | (United States) TRG | (France) Henri Richard (United States) René Villeneuve (United States) Andy Lally | Porsche 3.8 L Flat-6 | Y | 218 |
| 19 | GTC | 81 | (United States) Alex Job Racing | (Mexico) Juan González (United States) Butch Leitzinger | Porsche 997 GT3 Cup | Y | 217 |
| 19 | GTC | 81 | (United States) Alex Job Racing | (Mexico) Juan González (United States) Butch Leitzinger | Porsche 3.8 L Flat-6 | Y | 217 |
| 20 | GTC | 80 | (United States) Car Amigo - AJR | (Mexico) Ricardo González (Mexico) Luis Díaz (Mexico) Rudy Junco, Jr. | Porsche 997 GT3 Cup | Y | 217 |
| 20 | GTC | 80 | (United States) Car Amigo - AJR | (Mexico) Ricardo González (Mexico) Luis Díaz (Mexico) Rudy Junco, Jr. | Porsche 3.8 L Flat-6 | Y | 217 |
| 21 | GTC | 48 | (United States) Orbit Racing | (United States) Bryce Miller (United States) John McMullen (United Kingdom) Luke Hines | Porsche 997 GT3 Cup | Y | 216 |
| 21 | GTC | 48 | (United States) Orbit Racing | (United States) Bryce Miller (United States) John McMullen (United Kingdom) Luke Hines | Porsche 3.8 L Flat-6 | Y | 216 |
| 22 | GTC | 88 | (United States) Velox Motorsports | (United States) Shane Lewis (United States) Jerry Vento (United States) Lawson Aschenbach | Porsche 997 GT3 Cup | Y | 216 |
| 22 | GTC | 88 | (United States) Velox Motorsports | (United States) Shane Lewis (United States) Jerry Vento (United States) Lawson Aschenbach | Porsche 3.8 L Flat-6 | Y | 216 |
| 23 | GT | 40 | (United States) Robertson Racing | (United States) David Robertson (United States) Andrea Robertson (United States) David Murry | Ford GT-R Mk. VII | D | 215 |
| 23 | GT | 40 | (United States) Robertson Racing | (United States) David Robertson (United States) Andrea Robertson (United States) David Murry | Ford 5.0 L V8 | D | 215 |
| 24 | GT | 44 | (United States) Flying Lizard Motorsports | (United States) Darren Law (United States) Seth Neiman (Germany) Timo Bernhard | Porsche 997 GT3-RSR | M | 213 |
| 24 | GT | 44 | (United States) Flying Lizard Motorsports | (United States) Darren Law (United States) Seth Neiman (Germany) Timo Bernhard | Porsche 4.0 L Flat-6 | M | 213 |
| 25 | GTC | 23 | (United States) Alex Job Racing | (United States) Bill Sweedler (United States) Romeo Kapudija (Germany) Jan-Dirk Lueders | Porsche 997 GT3 Cup | Y | 212 |
| 25 | GTC | 23 | (United States) Alex Job Racing | (United States) Bill Sweedler (United States) Romeo Kapudija (Germany) Jan-Dirk Lueders | Porsche 3.8 L Flat-6 | Y | 212 |
| 26 | GTC | 69 | (United States) WERKS II Racing | (United States) Robert Rodriguez (United States) Galen Bieker | Porsche 997 GT3 Cup | Y | 212 |
| 26 | GTC | 69 | (United States) WERKS II Racing | (United States) Robert Rodriguez (United States) Galen Bieker | Porsche 3.8 L Flat-6 | Y | 212 |
| 27 | GTC | 28 | (United States) 911 Design | (United States) Loren Beggs (United States) Doug Baron | Porsche 997 GT3 Cup | Y | 211 |
| 27 | GTC | 28 | (United States) 911 Design | (United States) Loren Beggs (United States) Doug Baron | Porsche 3.8 L Flat-6 | Y | 211 |
| 28 DNF | GT | 02 | (United States) Extreme Speed Motorsports | (United States) Ed Brown (United States) Guy Cosmo | Ferrari F430 GTE | M | 194 |
| 28 DNF | GT | 02 | (United States) Extreme Speed Motorsports | (United States) Ed Brown (United States) Guy Cosmo | Ferrari 4.0 L V8 | M | 194 |
| 29 | GT | 75 | (United States) Jaguar RSR | (United States) Paul Gentilozzi (United Kingdom) Ryan Dalziel (Belgium) Marc Goossens | Jaguar XKRS | Y | 191 |
| 29 | GT | 75 | (United States) Jaguar RSR | (United States) Paul Gentilozzi (United Kingdom) Ryan Dalziel (Belgium) Marc Goossens | Jaguar 5.0 L V8 | Y | 191 |
| 30 DNF | LMP | 12 | (United States) Autocon Motorsports | (United States) Bryan Willman (Canada) Tony Burgess (Germany) Pierre Ehret | Lola B06/10 | D | 170 |
| 30 DNF | LMP | 12 | (United States) Autocon Motorsports | (United States) Bryan Willman (Canada) Tony Burgess (Germany) Pierre Ehret | AER P32C 4.0 L Turbo V8 | D | 170 |
| 31 DNF | LMP | 8 | (United Kingdom) Drayson Racing | (United Kingdom) Paul Drayson (United Kingdom) Jonny Cocker (Italy) Emanuele Pirro | Lola B09/60 | M | 108 |
| 31 DNF | LMP | 8 | (United Kingdom) Drayson Racing | (United Kingdom) Paul Drayson (United Kingdom) Jonny Cocker (Italy) Emanuele Pirro | Judd GV5.5 S2 5.5 L V10 | M | 108 |
| 32 DNF | LMPC | 52 | (United States) PR1/Mathiasen Motorsports | (United Kingdom) Johnny Mowlem (United States) Tom Papadopoulos (United Kingdom) Ryan Lewis | Oreca FLM09 | M | 107 |
| 32 DNF | LMPC | 52 | (United States) PR1/Mathiasen Motorsports | (United Kingdom) Johnny Mowlem (United States) Tom Papadopoulos (United Kingdom) Ryan Lewis | Chevrolet LS3 6.2 L V8 | M | 107 |
| 33 DNF | GTC | 32 | (United States) GMG Racing | (United States) Bret Curtis (United States) James Sofronas (United States) Terry Borcheller | Porsche 997 GT3 Cup | Y | 83 |
| 33 DNF | GTC | 32 | (United States) GMG Racing | (United States) Bret Curtis (United States) James Sofronas (United States) Terry Borcheller | Porsche 3.8 L Flat-6 | Y | 83 |
| 34 DNF | LMP | 37 | (United States) Intersport Racing | (United States) Jon Field (United States) Clint Field (United States) Nikolas Konstant | Lola B06/10 | D | 38 |
| 34 DNF | LMP | 37 | (United States) Intersport Racing | (United States) Jon Field (United States) Clint Field (United States) Nikolas Konstant | AER P32C 4.0 L Turbo V8 | D | 38 |
| 35 DNF | LMPC | 95 | (United States) Level 5 Motorsports | (United States) Scott Tucker (United Kingdom) Andy Wallace (United States) Burt Frisselle | Oreca FLM09 | M | 8 |
| 35 DNF | LMPC | 95 | (United States) Level 5 Motorsports | (United States) Scott Tucker (United Kingdom) Andy Wallace (United States) Burt Frisselle | Chevrolet LS3 6.2 L V8 | M | 8 |

American Le Mans Series
| Previous race: 2010 Long Beach Grand Prix | 2010 season | Next race: Utah Grand Prix |
