= 2010 12 Hours of Sebring =

Sports car endurance race

Track map of the Sebring International Raceway

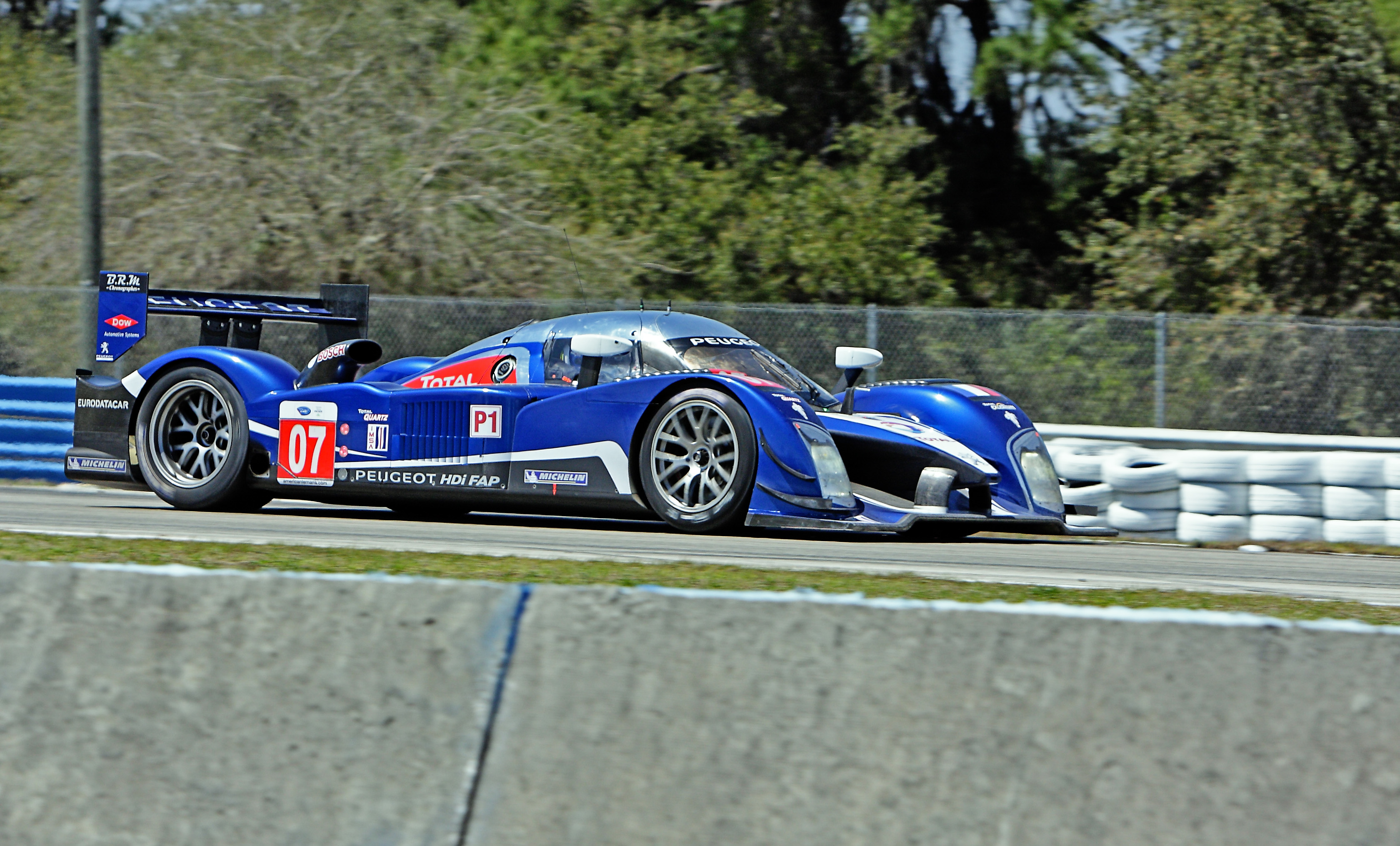
The race-winning Peugeot 908 HDi FAP

The 58th Mobil 1 12 Hours of Sebring presented by Fresh from Florida was the 2010 running of the 12 Hours of Sebring and the opening round of the 2010 American Le Mans Series season. It took place at the Sebring International Raceway, Sebring, Florida on March 20, 2010. The race featured the debut of the Le Mans Prototype Challenge category for spec racing.

The duo of LMP1s from Peugeot won the race by a three lap margin over fellow European manufacturer Aston Martin, earning the company their first victory at Sebring. Winning drivers Marc Gené and Alexander Wurz had previously won the 2009 24 Hours of Le Mans for Peugeot, and were joined by Anthony Davidson for the Sebring win. The LMP2 category was won by Team Cytosport, the first class victory for the team, while the new LMPC category was led by Level 5 Motorsports who had a 16 lap margin over their nearest competitor. Risi Competizione Ferrari won their second straight GT2 class at Sebring, while returning American Le Mans team Alex Job Racing won the first participation for the GTC class at the 12 Hours.

== Qualifying ==
=== Qualifying result ===
Pole position winners in each class are marked in bold.

Pos	Class	Team	Driver	Lap Time	Grid
1	**LMP1**	**#07 Team Peugeot Total**	**Marc Gené**	**1:45.214**	**1**
2	LMP1	#08 Team Peugeot otal	Nicolas Minassian	1:45.841	2
3	LMP1	#007 Aston Martin Racing	Stefan Mücke	1:46.079	3
4	LMP1	#8 Drayson Racing	Emanuele Pirro	1:46.460	4
5	**LMP2**	**#1 Patrón Highcroft Racing**	**Marino Franchitti**	**1:47.684**	**5**
6	LMP2	#6 Muscle Milk Team Cytosport	Klaus Graf	1:47.738	6
7	LMP2	#16 Dyson Racing Team	Guy Smith	1:47.882	7
8	LMP1	#12 Autocon Motorsports	Bryan Willman	1:54.441	8
9	**LMPC**	**#99 Green Earth Team Gunnar**	**Gunnar Jeannette**	**1:55.279**	**9**
10	LMPC	#95 Level 5 Motorsports	Ryan Hunter-Reay	1:55.397	10
11	LMPC	#55 Level 5 Motorsports	Christophe Bouchut	1:56.101	11
12	LMPC	#89 Intersport Racing	Mitch Pagerey	1:59.580	12
13	**GT2**	**#45 Flying Lizard Motorsports**	**Jörg Bergmeister**	**2:01.150**	**13**
14	GT2	#17 Team Falken Tire	Wolf Henzler	2:01.201	14
15	GT2	#62 Risi Competizione	Jaime Melo	2:01.236	15
16	GT2	#3 Corvette Racing	Jan Magnussen	2:01.358	16
17	GT2	#4 Corvette Racing	Oliver Gavin	2:01.628	17
18	GT2	#01 Extreme Speed Motorsports	Johannes van Overbeek	2:01.914	18
19	GT2	#92 BMW Rahal Letterman Racing	Bill Auberlen	2:01.922	19
20	GT2	#02 Extreme Speed Motorsports	Guy Cosmo	2:02.242	20
21	GT2	#40 Robertson Racing	David Murry	2:03.622	21
22	GT2	#75 Jaguar RSR	Marc Goossens	2:04.804	31
23	**GTC**	**#81 Alex Job Racing**	**Leh Keen**	**2:05.959**	**22**
24	GT2	#61 Risi Competizione	Tracy Krohn	2:06.680	23
25	GTC	#80 Car Amigo Alex Job Racing	Patrick Kelly	2:07.018	24
26	GTC	#23 Alex Job Racing	Romeo Kapudija	2:07.205	25
27	GTC	#88 Velox Motorsport	Shane Lewis	2:07.412	30
28	GTC	#32 GMG Racing	James Sofronas	2:07.751	26
29	GT2	#44 Flying Lizard Motorsports	Seth Neiman	2:07.874	29
30	GTC	#69 WERKS II Racing	Galen Bieker	2:10.312	32
31	GTC	#63 TRG	Henri Richard	2:11.371	27
–	LMPC	#11 Primetime-Braille Battery Race Group	No Time		28
–	LMPC	#36 Genoa Racing	J. R. Hildebrand	Disallowed	33
–	GT2	#90 BMW Rahal Letterman Racing	Dirk Müller	Disallowed	34

== Race ==
=== Race result ===
Class winners in bold. Cars failing to complete 70% of their class winner's distance are marked as Not Classified (NC).

Pos	Class	No	Team	Drivers	Chassis	Tire	Laps
Pos	Class	No	Team	Drivers	Engine	Tire	Laps
1	**LMP1**	**07**	**(France) Team Peugeot Total**	**(Spain) Marc Gené (Austria) Alexander Wurz (United Kingdom) Anthony Davidson**	**Peugeot 908 HDi FAP**	MI	**367**
1	**LMP1**	**07**	**(France) Team Peugeot Total**	**(Spain) Marc Gené (Austria) Alexander Wurz (United Kingdom) Anthony Davidson**	**Peugeot HDi 5.5 L Turbo V12 (Diesel)**	MI	**367**
2	LMP1	08	(France) Team Peugeot Total	(France) Sébastien Bourdais (France) Nicolas Minassian (Portugal) Pedro Lamy	Peugeot 908 HDi FAP	MI	367
2	LMP1	08	(France) Team Peugeot Total	(France) Sébastien Bourdais (France) Nicolas Minassian (Portugal) Pedro Lamy	Peugeot HDi 5.5 L Turbo V12 (Diesel)	MI	367
3	LMP1	007	(United Kingdom) Aston Martin Racing	(Mexico) Adrian Fernández (Germany) Stefan Mücke (Switzerland) Harold Primat	Lola-Aston Martin B09/60	MI	364
3	LMP1	007	(United Kingdom) Aston Martin Racing	(Mexico) Adrian Fernández (Germany) Stefan Mücke (Switzerland) Harold Primat	Aston Martin 6.0 L V12	MI	364
4	**LMP2**	**6**	**(United States) Muscle Milk Team Cytosport**	**(United States) Greg Pickett (Germany) Klaus Graf (Germany) Sascha Maassen**	**Porsche RS Spyder Evo**	MI	**353**
4	**LMP2**	**6**	**(United States) Muscle Milk Team Cytosport**	**(United States) Greg Pickett (Germany) Klaus Graf (Germany) Sascha Maassen**	**Porsche MR6 3.4 L V8**	MI	**353**
5	LMP2	1	(United States) Patrón Highcroft Racing	(Australia) David Brabham (France) Simon Pagenaud (United Kingdom) Marino Franchitti	HPD ARX-01C	MI	349
5	LMP2	1	(United States) Patrón Highcroft Racing	(Australia) David Brabham (France) Simon Pagenaud (United Kingdom) Marino Franchitti	HPD AL7R 3.4 L V8	MI	349
6	**GT2**	**62**	**(United States) Risi Competizione**	**(Brazil) Jaime Melo (Italy) Gianmaria Bruni (Germany) Pierre Kaffer**	**Ferrari F430 GTE**	MI	**331**
6	**GT2**	**62**	**(United States) Risi Competizione**	**(Brazil) Jaime Melo (Italy) Gianmaria Bruni (Germany) Pierre Kaffer**	**Ferrari 4.0 L V8**	MI	**331**
7	GT2	92	(United States) BMW Rahal Letterman Racing	(United States) Bill Auberlen (United States) Tommy Milner (Germany) Dirk Werner	BMW M3 GT2	D	330
7	GT2	92	(United States) BMW Rahal Letterman Racing	(United States) Bill Auberlen (United States) Tommy Milner (Germany) Dirk Werner	BMW 4.0 L V8	D	330
8	GT2	90	(United States) BMW Rahal Letterman Racing	(Germany) Dirk Müller (United States) Joey Hand (United Kingdom) Andy Priaulx	BMW M3 GT2	D	330
8	GT2	90	(United States) BMW Rahal Letterman Racing	(Germany) Dirk Müller (United States) Joey Hand (United Kingdom) Andy Priaulx	BMW 4.0 L V8	D	330
9	GT2	45	(United States) Flying Lizard Motorsports	(United States) Patrick Long (Germany) Jörg Bergmeister (Germany) Marc Lieb	Porsche 997 GT3-RSR	MI	329
9	GT2	45	(United States) Flying Lizard Motorsports	(United States) Patrick Long (Germany) Jörg Bergmeister (Germany) Marc Lieb	Porsche 4.0 L Flat-6	MI	329
10	**LMPC**	**55**	**(United States) Level 5 Motorsports**	**(United States) Scott Tucker (France) Christophe Bouchut (Canada) Mark Wilkins**	**Oreca FLM09**	MI	**327**
10	**LMPC**	**55**	**(United States) Level 5 Motorsports**	**(United States) Scott Tucker (France) Christophe Bouchut (Canada) Mark Wilkins**	**Chevrolet 6.2 L V8**	MI	**327**
11	GT2	44	(United States) Flying Lizard Motorsports	(United States) Darren Law (United States) Seth Neiman (Austria) Richard Lietz	Porsche 997 GT3-RSR	MI	325
11	GT2	44	(United States) Flying Lizard Motorsports	(United States) Darren Law (United States) Seth Neiman (Austria) Richard Lietz	Porsche 4.0 L Flat-6	MI	325
12	LMP1	8	(United Kingdom) Drayson Racing	(United Kingdom) Paul Drayson (United Kingdom) Jonny Cocker (Italy) Emanuele Pirro	Lola B09/60	MI	324
12	LMP1	8	(United Kingdom) Drayson Racing	(United Kingdom) Paul Drayson (United Kingdom) Jonny Cocker (Italy) Emanuele Pirro	Judd GV5.5 S2 5.5 L V10	MI	324
13	GT2	02	(United States) Extreme Speed Motorsports	(United States) Ed Brown (United States) Guy Cosmo (Portugal) João Barbosa	Ferrari F430 GTE	MI	323
13	GT2	02	(United States) Extreme Speed Motorsports	(United States) Ed Brown (United States) Guy Cosmo (Portugal) João Barbosa	Ferrari 4.0 L V8	MI	323
14	GT2	61	(United States) Risi Competizione (United States) Krohn Racing	(United States) Tracy Krohn (Sweden) Niclas Jönsson (Belgium) Eric van de Poele	Ferrari F430 GTE	MI	321
14	GT2	61	(United States) Risi Competizione (United States) Krohn Racing	(United States) Tracy Krohn (Sweden) Niclas Jönsson (Belgium) Eric van de Poele	Ferrari 4.0 L V8	MI	321
15	GT2	3	(United States) Corvette Racing	(United States) Johnny O'Connell (Denmark) Jan Magnussen (Spain) Antonio García	Chevrolet Corvette C6.R	MI	320
15	GT2	3	(United States) Corvette Racing	(United States) Johnny O'Connell (Denmark) Jan Magnussen (Spain) Antonio García	Chevrolet 5.5 L V8	MI	320
16	GT2	4	(United States) Corvette Racing	(United Kingdom) Oliver Gavin (Monaco) Olivier Beretta (France) Emmanuel Collard	Chevrolet Corvette C6.R	MI	320
16	GT2	4	(United States) Corvette Racing	(United Kingdom) Oliver Gavin (Monaco) Olivier Beretta (France) Emmanuel Collard	Chevrolet 5.5 L V8	MI	320
17‡	LMPC	99	(United States) Green Earth Team Gunnar	(United States) Gunnar Jeannette (Germany) Christian Zugel (United States) Elton Julian	Oreca FLM09	MI	311
17‡	LMPC	99	(United States) Green Earth Team Gunnar	(United States) Gunnar Jeannette (Germany) Christian Zugel (United States) Elton Julian	Chevrolet 6.2 L V8	MI	311
18	**GTC**	**81**	**(United States) Alex Job Racing**	**(United States) Butch Leitzinger (Mexico) Juan González (United States) Leh Keen**	**Porsche 997 GT3 Cup**	Y	**308**
18	**GTC**	**81**	**(United States) Alex Job Racing**	**(United States) Butch Leitzinger (Mexico) Juan González (United States) Leh Keen**	**Porsche 3.8 L Flat-6**	Y	**308**
19	GTC	23	(United States) Alex Job Racing	(United States) Romeo Kapudija (United States) Bill Sweedler (Germany) Jan-Dirk Lueders	Porsche 997 GT3 Cup	Y	305
19	GTC	23	(United States) Alex Job Racing	(United States) Romeo Kapudija (United States) Bill Sweedler (Germany) Jan-Dirk Lueders	Porsche 3.8 L Flat-6	Y	305
20	GTC	80	(United States) Car Amigo Alex Job Racing	(Mexico) Luis Díaz (Mexico) Ricardo González (United States) Patrick Kelly	Porsche 997 GT3 Cup	Y	304
20	GTC	80	(United States) Car Amigo Alex Job Racing	(Mexico) Luis Díaz (Mexico) Ricardo González (United States) Patrick Kelly	Porsche 3.8 L Flat-6	Y	304
21	LMP2	16	(United States) Dyson Racing Team	(United States) Chris Dyson (United Kingdom) Guy Smith (United Kingdom) Andy Meyrick	Lola B09/86	D	303
21	LMP2	16	(United States) Dyson Racing Team	(United States) Chris Dyson (United Kingdom) Guy Smith (United Kingdom) Andy Meyrick	Mazda MZR-R 2.0 L Turbo I4 (Butanol)	D	303
22	GTC	69	(United States) WERKS II Racing	(United States) Galen Bieker (United States) Robert Rodriguez (United States) Cory Friedman	Porsche 997 GT3 Cup	Y	302
22	GTC	69	(United States) WERKS II Racing	(United States) Galen Bieker (United States) Robert Rodriguez (United States) Cory Friedman	Porsche 3.8 L Flat-6	Y	302
23	GT2	40	(United States) Robertson Racing	(United States) David Robertson (United States) Andrea Robertson (United States) David Murry	Ford GT-R Mk. VII	D	300
23	GT2	40	(United States) Robertson Racing	(United States) David Robertson (United States) Andrea Robertson (United States) David Murry	Ford 5.0 L V8	D	300
24	GTC	88	(United States) Velox Racing	(United States) Shane Lewis (United States) Jerry Vento (United States) Lawson Aschenbach	Porsche 997 GT3 Cup	Y	299
24	GTC	88	(United States) Velox Racing	(United States) Shane Lewis (United States) Jerry Vento (United States) Lawson Aschenbach	Porsche 3.8 L Flat-6	Y	299
25	GTC	63	(United States) TRG	(France) Henri Richard (United States) Duncan Ende (United States) Andy Lally	Porsche 997 GT3 Cup	Y	282
25	GTC	63	(United States) TRG	(France) Henri Richard (United States) Duncan Ende (United States) Andy Lally	Porsche 3.8 L Flat-6	Y	282
26	LMPC	36	(United States) Genoa Racing	(United Kingdom) Andy Wallace (United States) J. R. Hildebrand (United States) Tom Sutherland	Oreca FLM09	MI	281
26	LMPC	36	(United States) Genoa Racing	(United Kingdom) Andy Wallace (United States) J. R. Hildebrand (United States) Tom Sutherland	Chevrolet 6.2 L V8	MI	281
27	GTC	32	(United States) GMG Racing	(United States) James Sofronas (United States) Bret Curtis (United States) Andy Pilgrim	Porsche 997 GT3 Cup	Y	280
27	GTC	32	(United States) GMG Racing	(United States) James Sofronas (United States) Bret Curtis (United States) Andy Pilgrim	Porsche 3.8 L Flat-6	Y	280
28 DNF	GT2	01	(United States) Extreme Speed Motorsports	(United States) Scott Sharp (United States) Johannes van Overbeek (Germany) Dominik Farnbacher	Ferrari F430 GTE	MI	271
28 DNF	GT2	01	(United States) Extreme Speed Motorsports	(United States) Scott Sharp (United States) Johannes van Overbeek (Germany) Dominik Farnbacher	Ferrari 4.0 L V8	MI	271
29	GT2	17	(United States) Team Falken Tire	(Germany) Wolf Henzler (United States) Bryan Sellers (France) Patrick Pilet	Porsche 997 GT3-RSR	FAL	255
29	GT2	17	(United States) Team Falken Tire	(Germany) Wolf Henzler (United States) Bryan Sellers (France) Patrick Pilet	Porsche 4.0 L Flat-6	FAL	255
30	LMPC	11	(United States) Primetime-Braille Battery Race Group	(United States) Joel Feinberg (United States) Tom Weickardt (Canada) Kyle Marcelli	Oreca FLM09	MI	234
30	LMPC	11	(United States) Primetime-Braille Battery Race Group	(United States) Joel Feinberg (United States) Tom Weickardt (Canada) Kyle Marcelli	Chevrolet 6.2 L V8	MI	234
31 DNF	LMPC	89	(United States) Intersport Racing	(United States) Mitch Pagerey (United States) Brian Wong (United States) David Ducote	Oreca FLM09	MI	232
31 DNF	LMPC	89	(United States) Intersport Racing	(United States) Mitch Pagerey (United States) Brian Wong (United States) David Ducote	Chevrolet 6.2 L V8	MI	232
32‡ NC	LMPC	95	(United States) Level 5 Motorsports	(United States) Scott Tucker (United States) Ryan Hunter-Reay (United States) James Gue	Oreca FLM09	MI	224
32‡ NC	LMPC	95	(United States) Level 5 Motorsports	(United States) Scott Tucker (United States) Ryan Hunter-Reay (United States) James Gue	Chevrolet 6.2 L V8	MI	224
33 DNF	GT2	75	(United States) Jaguar RSR	(United States) Paul Gentilozzi (United Kingdom) Ryan Dalziel (Belgium) Marc Goossens	Jaguar XKRS	Y	11
33 DNF	GT2	75	(United States) Jaguar RSR	(United States) Paul Gentilozzi (United Kingdom) Ryan Dalziel (Belgium) Marc Goossens	Jaguar 5.0 L V8	Y	11
DNS	LMP1	12	(United States) Autocon Motorsports	(United States) Bryan Willman (Canada) Tony Burgess (Germany) Pierre Ehret	Lola B06/10	D	–
DNS	LMP1	12	(United States) Autocon Motorsports	(United States) Bryan Willman (Canada) Tony Burgess (Germany) Pierre Ehret	AER P32T 4.0 L Turbo V8	D	–

‡ The #95 Level 5 Motorsports entry and the #99 Green Earth Team Gunnar entry were initially disqualified from the results, but, following a rule clarification by the ALMS, the two cars have been reinstated into the results.

American Le Mans Series
Previous race: None	2010 season	Next race: American Le Mans Series at Long Beach
