= 2010 American Le Mans Series powered by eStar =

Track map of Road America.

The 2010 American Le Mans Series powered by eStar was the seventh round of the 2010 American Le Mans Series season. It took place at Road America on August 22, 2010.

== Qualifying ==
=== Qualifying result ===
Pole position winners in each class are marked in bold.

Pos	Class	Team	Driver	Lap Time	Grid
1	**LMP**	**#8 Drayson Racing**	**Jonny Cocker**	**1:49.554**	**1**
2	LMP	#16 Dyson Racing Team	Guy Smith	1:50.875	2
3	LMP	#6 Muscle Milk Team Cytosport	Klaus Graf	1:51.312	3
4	LMP	#12 Autocon Motorsports	Johnny Mowlem	1:51.711	4
5	LMP	#1 Patrón Highcroft Racing	David Brabham	1:52.148	5
6	**LMPC**	**#52 PR1/Mathiasen Motorsports**	**Luis Díaz**	**1:58.287**	**6**
7	LMPC	#89 Genoa Racing	Kyle Marcelli	1:59.412	7
8	LMPC	#99 Green Earth Team Gunnar	Gunnar Jeannette	2:00.092	8
9	LMPC	#95 Level 5 Motorsports	Andy Wallace	2:00.740	9
10	LMPC	#36 Genoa Racing	Frankie Montecalvo	2:00.046	10
11	**GT**	**#4 Corvette Racing**	**Oliver Gavin**	**2:06.509**	**11**
12	GT	#3 Corvette Racing	Jan Magnussen	2:06.674	12
13	GT	#61 Risi Competizione	Pierre Kaffer	2:06.997	13
14	GT	#90 BMW Rahal Letterman Racing	Joey Hand	2:07.222	14
15	GT	#45 Flying Lizard Motorsports	Jörg Bergmeister	2:07.392	15
16	GT	#01 Extreme Speed Motorsports	Johannes van Overbeek	2:07.455	16
17	GT	#62 Risi Competizione	Jaime Melo	2:07.561	17
18	GT	#92 BMW Rahal Letterman Racing	Tommy Milner	2:07.716	18
19	GT	#17 Team Falken Tire	Wolf Henzler	2:07.939	19
20	GT	#40 Robertson Racing	David Murry	2:08.703	20
21	GT	#75 Jaguar RSR	Ryan Dalziel	2:10.084	21
22	**GTC**	**#54 Black Swan Racing**	**Jeroen Bleekemolen**	**2:14.345**	**22**
23	GTC	#63 TRG	Andy Lally	2:14.520	33
24	GTC	#32 GMG Racing	James Sofronas	2:14.843	23
25	GTC	#48 ORBIT/Paul Miller Racing	Bryce Miller	2:15.656	24
26	GT	#02 Extreme Speed Motorsports	Ed Brown	2:15.710	25
27	GTC	#69 WERKS II Racing	Galen Bieker	2:15.972	26
28	GTC	#88 Velox Motorsports	Shane Lewis	2:16.216	27
29	GTC	#23 Alex Job Racing	Romeo Kapudija	2:16.221	28
30	GT	#44 Flying Lizard Motorsports	Seth Neiman	2:20.428	29
31	GTC	#28 911 Design	No Time		30
32	LMP	#37 Intersport Racing	No Time		31
33	LMPC	#55 Level 5 Motorsports	No Time		32

== Race ==
=== Race result ===
Class winners in bold. Cars failing to complete 70% of their class winner's distance are marked as Not Classified (NC).

Pos	Class	No	Team	Drivers	Chassis	Tire	Laps
Pos	Class	No	Team	Drivers	Engine	Tire	Laps
1	**LMP**	**8**	**(United Kingdom) Drayson Racing**	**(United Kingdom) Paul Drayson (United Kingdom) Jonny Cocker**	**Lola B09/60**	MI	**69**
1	**LMP**	**8**	**(United Kingdom) Drayson Racing**	**(United Kingdom) Paul Drayson (United Kingdom) Jonny Cocker**	**Judd GV5.5 S2 5.5 L V10 (E85 Ethanol)**	MI	**69**
2	LMP	6	(United States) Muscle Milk Team Cytosport	(Germany) Klaus Graf (Germany) Timo Bernhard	Porsche RS Spyder Evo	MI	69
2	LMP	6	(United States) Muscle Milk Team Cytosport	(Germany) Klaus Graf (Germany) Timo Bernhard	Porsche MR6 3.4 L V8	MI	69
3	LMP	1	(United States) Patrón Highcroft Racing	(Australia) David Brabham (France) Simon Pagenaud	HPD ARX-01C	MI	69
3	LMP	1	(United States) Patrón Highcroft Racing	(Australia) David Brabham (France) Simon Pagenaud	HPD AL7.R 3.4 L V8	MI	69
4	LMP	16	(United States) Dyson Racing Team	(United States) Chris Dyson (United Kingdom) Guy Smith	Lola B09/86	D	68
4	LMP	16	(United States) Dyson Racing Team	(United States) Chris Dyson (United Kingdom) Guy Smith	Mazda MZR-R 2.0 L Turbo I4 (Isobutanol)	D	68
5	**LMPC**	**99**	**(United States) Green Earth Team Gunnar**	**(United States) Gunnar Jeannette (United States) Elton Julian**	**Oreca FLM09**	MI	**67**
5	**LMPC**	**99**	**(United States) Green Earth Team Gunnar**	**(United States) Gunnar Jeannette (United States) Elton Julian**	Chevrolet LS3 6.2 L V8	MI	**67**
6	LMPC	52	(United States) PR1/Mathiasen Motorsports	(Mexico) Ricardo González (Mexico) Luis Díaz	Oreca FLM09	MI	67
6	LMPC	52	(United States) PR1/Mathiasen Motorsports	(Mexico) Ricardo González (Mexico) Luis Díaz	Chevrolet LS3 6.2 L V8	MI	67
7	**GT**	**90**	**(United States) BMW Rahal Letterman Racing**	**(Germany) Dirk Müller (United States) Joey Hand**	**BMW M3 GT2**	D	**66**
7	**GT**	**90**	**(United States) BMW Rahal Letterman Racing**	**(Germany) Dirk Müller (United States) Joey Hand**	**BMW 4.0 L V8 (E85 Ethanol)**	D	**66**
8	GT	45	(United States) Flying Lizard Motorsports	(Germany) Jörg Bergmeister (United States) Patrick Long	Porsche 997 GT3-RSR	MI	66
8	GT	45	(United States) Flying Lizard Motorsports	(Germany) Jörg Bergmeister (United States) Patrick Long	Porsche 4.0 L Flat-6 (E85 Ethanol)	MI	66
9	GT	4	(United States) Corvette Racing	(Monaco) Olivier Beretta (United Kingdom) Oliver Gavin	Chevrolet Corvette C6.R	MI	66
9	GT	4	(United States) Corvette Racing	(Monaco) Olivier Beretta (United Kingdom) Oliver Gavin	Chevrolet 5.5 L V8 (E85 Ethanol)	MI	66
10	GT	3	(United States) Corvette Racing	(Denmark) Jan Magnussen (United States) Johnny O'Connell	Chevrolet Corvette C6.R	MI	66
10	GT	3	(United States) Corvette Racing	(Denmark) Jan Magnussen (United States) Johnny O'Connell	Chevrolet 5.5 L V8 (E85 Ethanol)	MI	66
11	GT	02	(United States) Extreme Speed Motorsports	(United States) Ed Brown (United States) Guy Cosmo	Ferrari F430 GTE	MI	66
11	GT	02	(United States) Extreme Speed Motorsports	(United States) Ed Brown (United States) Guy Cosmo	Ferrari 4.0 L V8	MI	66
12	GT	62	(United States) Risi Competizione	(Brazil) Jaime Melo (Italy) Gianmaria Bruni	Ferrari F430 GTE	MI	66
12	GT	62	(United States) Risi Competizione	(Brazil) Jaime Melo (Italy) Gianmaria Bruni	Ferrari 4.0 L V8 (E85 Ethanol)	MI	66
13	LMPC	95	(United States) Level 5 Motorsports	(United States) Scott Tucker (United Kingdom) Andy Wallace	Oreca FLM09	MI	66
13	LMPC	95	(United States) Level 5 Motorsports	(United States) Scott Tucker (United Kingdom) Andy Wallace	Chevrolet LS3 6.2 L V8	MI	66
14	GT	61	(United States) Risi Competizione	(Finland) Mika Salo (Switzerland) Pierre Kaffer	Ferrari F430 GTE	MI	66
14	GT	61	(United States) Risi Competizione	(Finland) Mika Salo (Switzerland) Pierre Kaffer	Ferrari 4.0 L V8 (E85 Ethanol)	MI	66
15	GT	01	(United States) Extreme Speed Motorsports	(United States) Scott Sharp (United States) Johannes van Overbeek	Ferrari F430 GTE	MI	66
15	GT	01	(United States) Extreme Speed Motorsports	(United States) Scott Sharp (United States) Johannes van Overbeek	Ferrari 4.0 L V8	MI	66
16	GT	44	(United States) Flying Lizard Motorsports	(United States) Darren Law (United States) Seth Neiman	Porsche 997 GT3-RSR	MI	66
16	GT	44	(United States) Flying Lizard Motorsports	(United States) Darren Law (United States) Seth Neiman	Porsche 4.0 L Flat-6 (E85 Ethanol)	MI	66
17	GT	17	(United States) Team Falken Tire	(United States) Bryan Sellers (Germany) Wolf Henzler	Porsche 997 GT3-RSR	FAL	65
17	GT	17	(United States) Team Falken Tire	(United States) Bryan Sellers (Germany) Wolf Henzler	Porsche 4.0 L Flat-6	FAL	65
18	**GTC**	**54**	**(United States) Black Swan Racing**	**(United States) Tim Pappas (Netherlands) Jeroen Bleekemolen**	**Porsche 997 GT3 Cup**	Y	**64**
18	**GTC**	**54**	**(United States) Black Swan Racing**	**(United States) Tim Pappas (Netherlands) Jeroen Bleekemolen**	**Porsche 3.6 L Flat-6**	Y	**64**
19	GTC	69	(United States) WERKS II Racing	(United States) Robert Rodriguez (United States) Galen Bieker	Porsche 997 GT3 Cup	Y	63
19	GTC	69	(United States) WERKS II Racing	(United States) Robert Rodriguez (United States) Galen Bieker	**Porsche 3.8 L Flat-6**	Y	63
20	GTC	88	(United States) Velox Motorsports	(United States) Shane Lewis (United States) Vic Rice	Porsche 997 GT3 Cup	Y	63
20	GTC	88	(United States) Velox Motorsports	(United States) Shane Lewis (United States) Vic Rice	Porsche 3.8 L Flat-6	Y	63
21	GTC	23	(United States) Alex Job Racing	(United States) Bill Sweedler (United States) Romeo Kapudija	Porsche 997 GT3 Cup	Y	63
21	GTC	23	(United States) Alex Job Racing	(United States) Bill Sweedler (United States) Romeo Kapudija	Porsche 3.8 L Flat-6	Y	63
22	GTC	63	(United States) TRG	(United States) Duncan Ende (United States) Andy Lally	Porsche 997 GT3 Cup	MI	63
22	GTC	63	(United States) TRG	(United States) Duncan Ende (United States) Andy Lally	Porsche 3.8 L Flat-6	MI	63
23	GTC	28	(United States) 911 Design	(United States) Loren Beggs (United States) Doug Baron	Porsche 997 GT3 Cup	Y	61
23	GTC	28	(United States) 911 Design	(United States) Loren Beggs (United States) Doug Baron	Porsche 3.8 L Flat-6	Y	61
24	GT	40	(United States) Robertson Racing	(United States) David Robertson (United States) Andrea Robertson (United States) David Murry	Ford GT-R Mk. VII	D	59
24	GT	40	(United States) Robertson Racing	(United States) David Robertson (United States) Andrea Robertson (United States) David Murry	Ford 5.0 L V8	D	59
25	LMP	12	(United States) Autocon Motorsports	(United States) Bryan Willman (Canada) Tony Burgess (United Kingdom) Johnny Mowlem	Lola B06/10	D	59
25	LMP	12	(United States) Autocon Motorsports	(United States) Bryan Willman (Canada) Tony Burgess (United Kingdom) Johnny Mowlem	AER P32C 4.0 L Turbo V8 (E85 Ethanol)	D	59
26 DNF	LMPC	89	(United States) Intersport Racing	(Canada) Kyle Marcelli (United States) Chapman Ducote	Oreca FLM09	MI	47
26 DNF	LMPC	89	(United States) Intersport Racing	(Canada) Kyle Marcelli (United States) Chapman Ducote	Chevrolet LS3 6.2 L V8	MI	47
27 DNF	LMPC	36	(United States) Genoa Racing	(Germany) Christian Zugel (United States) Frankie Montecalvo	Oreca FLM09	MI	36
27 DNF	LMPC	36	(United States) Genoa Racing	(Germany) Christian Zugel (United States) Frankie Montecalvo	Chevrolet LS3 6.2 L V8	MI	36
28 DNF	GTC	48	(United States) ORBIT/Paul Miller Racing	(United States) Bryce Miller (United Kingdom) Luke Hines	Porsche 997 GT3 Cup	Y	36
28 DNF	GTC	48	(United States) ORBIT/Paul Miller Racing	(United States) Bryce Miller (United Kingdom) Luke Hines	Porsche 3.8 L Flat-6	Y	36
29 DNF	GT	75	(United States) Jaguar RSR	(Belgium) Marc Goossens (United Kingdom) Ryan Dalziel	Jaguar XKRS	Y	26
29 DNF	GT	75	(United States) Jaguar RSR	(Belgium) Marc Goossens (United Kingdom) Ryan Dalziel	Jaguar 5.0 L V8	Y	26
30 DNF	GT	92	(United States) BMW Rahal Letterman Racing	(United States) Bill Auberlen (United States) Tommy Milner	BMW M3 GT2	D	8
30 DNF	GT	92	(United States) BMW Rahal Letterman Racing	(United States) Bill Auberlen (United States) Tommy Milner	BMW 4.0 L V8 (E85 Ethanol)	D	8
31 DNF	LMPC	55	(United States) Level 5 Motorsports	(United States) Scott Tucker (France) Christophe Bouchut	Oreca FLM09	MI	8
31 DNF	LMPC	55	(United States) Level 5 Motorsports	(United States) Scott Tucker (France) Christophe Bouchut	Chevrolet LS3 6.2 L V8	MI	8
32 DNF	GTC	32	(United States) GMG Racing	(United States) Bret Curtis (United States) James Sofronas	Porsche 997 GT3 Cup	Y	8
32 DNF	GTC	32	(United States) GMG Racing	(United States) Bret Curtis (United States) James Sofronas	Porsche 3.8 L Flat-6	Y	8
33 DNF	LMP	37	(United States) Intersport Racing	(United States) Jon Field (United States) Clint Field	Lola B06/10	D	6
33 DNF	LMP	37	(United States) Intersport Racing	(United States) Jon Field (United States) Clint Field	AER P32C 4.0 L Turbo V8 (E85 Ethanol)	D	6

American Le Mans Series
Previous race: Mid-Ohio Sports Car Challenge	2010 season	Next race: Grand Prix of Mosport
