= Wolf Henzler =

German racecar driver

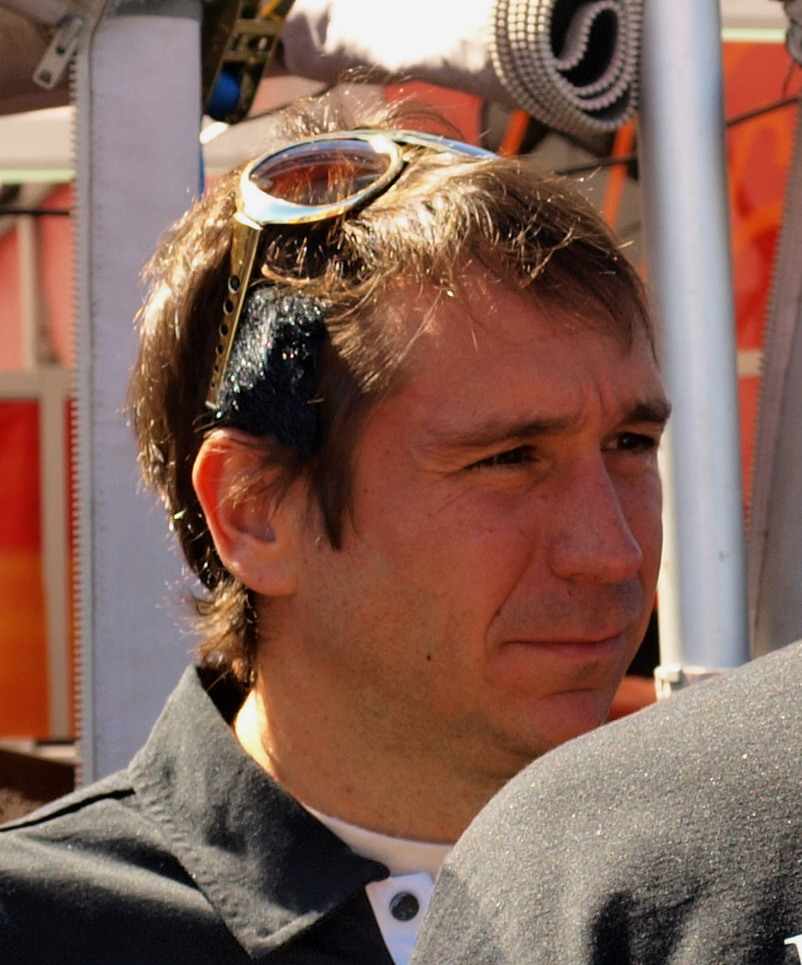
- Henzler at the 2008 Petit Le Mans
- Nationality: German
- Born: Wolfgang Henzler; 5 April 1975 (age 51)
- Categorisation: FIA Platinum (until 2018); FIA Gold (2019–2023); FIA Silver (2024–)

24 Hours of Le Mans career
- Years: 2008–2013, 2015–2016
- Teams: Team Felbermayr-Proton
- Best finish: 11th (2010)
- Class wins: 1 (2010)

Wolfgang Henzler (born 5 April 1975) is a former German Porsche factory racing driver. He began racing in 1991 with a win in the German Junior Kart championship.

Born in Nürtingen, Baden-Württemberg, Henzler won one time the 24 Hours of Le Mans in 2010 in the GTE PRO category.

Henzler won the Porsche Cup, an annual award presented by Porsche AG to recognize the world's most successful privateer racing driver competing with Porsche machinery in a customer racing team, in 2006.

Henzler's last major championship win was in the GT class of the 2013 Petit Le Mans.

Henzler resides in Braselton, Georgia in the United States.

== Racing record ==
=== Complete International Formula 3000 results ===
(key) (Races in bold indicate pole position; races in italics indicate fastest lap.)

| Year | Entrant | Chassis | Engine | 1 | 2 | 3 | 4 | 5 | 6 | 7 | 8 | 9 | 10 | DC | Points |
|---|---|---|---|---|---|---|---|---|---|---|---|---|---|---|---|
| 1999 | Durango Formula | Lola T99/50 | Zytek | IMO; Ret | MON; DNQ | CAT; DNQ | MAG; Ret | SIL; DNQ | A1R; 13 | HOC; DNQ | HUN | SPA | NÜR | NC | 0 |

=== 24 Hours of Le Mans results ===
| Year | Team | Co-Drivers | Car | Class | Laps | Pos. | Class Pos. |
|---|---|---|---|---|---|---|---|
| 2008 | (Germany) Team Felbermayr-Proton | (Austria) Horst Felbermayr, Sr. (Australia) Alex Davison | Porsche 997 GT3-RSR | GT2 | 309 | 27th | 5th |
| 2009 | (Germany) Team Felbermayr-Proton | (Germany) Marc Lieb (Austria) Richard Lietz | Porsche 997 GT3-RSR | GT2 | 24 | DNF | DNF |
| 2010 | (Germany) Team Felbermayr-Proton | (Germany) Marc Lieb (Austria) Richard Lietz | Porsche 997 GT3-RSR | GT2 | 338 | 11th | **1st** |
| 2011 | (Germany) Team Felbermayr-Proton | (Germany) Marc Lieb (Austria) Richard Lietz | Porsche 997 GT3-RSR | GTE; Pro | 312 | 16th | 4th |
| 2012 | (Germany) Team Felbermayr-Proton | (Germany) Marc Lieb (Austria) Richard Lietz | Porsche 997 GT3-RSR | GTE; Pro | 184 | DNF | DNF |
| 2013 | (France) IMSA Performance Matmut | (France) Pascal Gibon (France) Patrice Milesi | Porsche 911 GT3 RSR | GTE; Am | 300 | 33rd | 7th |
| 2015 | (Germany) Porsche Team Manthey | (France) Patrick Pilet (France) Frédéric Makowiecki | Porsche 911 RSR | GTE; Pro | 14 | DNF | DNF |
| 2016 | (Hong Kong) KCMG | (Switzerland) Joël Camathias (Germany) Christian Ried | Porsche 911 RSR | GTE; Am | 300 | 41st | 10th |

=== American Le Mans Series results ===
(key) (Races in bold indicate pole position; results in italics indicate fastest lap)

| Year | Team | Class | Make | Engine | 1 | 2 | 3 | 4 | 5 | 6 | 7 | 8 | 9 | 10 | 11 | 12 | Pos. | Points | Ref |
|---|---|---|---|---|---|---|---|---|---|---|---|---|---|---|---|---|---|---|---|
| 2010 | Team Falken Tire | GT | Porsche 911 GT3 RSR | Porsche 4.0 L Flat-6 | SEB; 12 | LBH; 6 | LAG; 7 | UTA; 9 | LRP; 8 | MDO; 8 | ELK; 10 | MOS; 7 | PET | | | | 17th | 40 | |
| 2011 | Team Falken Tire | GT | Porsche 911 GT3 RSR | Porsche 4.0 L Flat-6 | SEB; Ret | LBH; 4 | LRP; 5 | MOS; 5 | MDO; 1 | ELK; 6 | BAL; 1 | LAG; Ret | PET; 5 | | | | 5th | 97 | |
| 2012 | Team Falken Tire | GT | Porsche 911 GT3 RSR | Porsche 4.0 L Flat-6 | SEB; 8 | LBH; 6 | LAG; 7 | LRP; 7 | MOS; 4 | MDO; 4 | ELK; 12† | BAL; 1 | VIR; 7 | PET; 6 | | | 8th | 81 | |
| 2013 | Team Falken Tire | GT | Porsche 911 GT3 RSR | Porsche 4.0 L Flat-6 | SEB; 3 | LBH; 10 | LAG; 2† | LRP; 8 | MOS; 10 | ELK; 9 | BAL; Ret | COA; 7 | VIR; 8 | PET; 1 | | | 10th | 55 | |

^{†} Did not finish the race but was classified as his car completed more than 70% of the overall winner's race distance.

^{†} Henzler's car failed post-race technical inspection, forfeiting all championship points but still maintaining its finishing position in the race.

=== Complete FIA World Endurance Championship results ===
(key) (Races in bold indicate pole position; races in italics indicate fastest lap)

| Year | Entrant | Class | Chassis | Engine | 1 | 2 | 3 | 4 | 5 | 6 | 7 | 8 | 9 | Rank | Points |
|---|---|---|---|---|---|---|---|---|---|---|---|---|---|---|---|
| 2016 | KCMG | LMGTE Am | Porsche 911 RSR | Porsche 4.0L Flat-6 | SIL; 4 | SPA; 4 | LMS; 6 | NÜR; DSQ | MEX; 3 | COA; 2 | FUJ; 3 | SHA; 3 | BHR; 2 | 5th | 121 |

=== Complete WeatherTech SportsCar Championship results ===
(key) (Races in bold indicate pole position; results in italics indicate fastest lap)

| Year | Team | Class | Make | Engine | 1 | 2 | 3 | 4 | 5 | 6 | 7 | 8 | 9 | 10 | 11 | 12 | Pos. | Points | Ref |
|---|---|---|---|---|---|---|---|---|---|---|---|---|---|---|---|---|---|---|---|
| 2014 | Magnus Racing | GTD | Porsche 911 GT America | Porsche 4.0 L Flat-6 | DAY; 12 | SEB | LGA | DET | WGL | MOS | IND | ELK | VIR | COA | COA | | 80th | 21 | |
| 2014 | Team Falken Tire | GTLM | Porsche 911 RSR | Porsche 4.0 L Flat-6 | DAY | SEB; 5 | LBH; 8 | LAG; 4 | WGI; 9 | MOS; 8 | IMS; 9 | ELK; 9 | VIR; 2 | COA; 8 | PET; 1 | | 12th | 266 | |
| 2015 | Team Falken Tire | GTLM | Porsche 911 RSR | Porsche 4.0 L Flat-6 | DAY; 8 | SEB; 3 | LBH; 6 | LGA; 8 | WGL; 1 | MOS; 8 | ROA; 8 | VIR; 7 | COA; 4 | PET; 7 | | | 7th | 268 | |
| 2016 | Team Seattle | GTD | Porsche 911 GT3 R | Porsche 4.0 L Flat-6 | DAY; 8 | SEB | LGA | BEL | WGL | MOS | LIM | ELK | VIR | AUS | PET | | 48th | 25 | |
| 2017 | TRG | GTD | Porsche 911 GT3 R | Porsche 4.0 L Flat-6 | DAY; 10 | SEB | LBH; 5 | AUS | BEL | WGL | MOS | LIM | ELK | VIR | LGA | PET | 46th | 47 | |
| 2017 | Porsche GT Team | GTLM | Porsche 911 RSR | Porsche 4.0 L Flat-6 | DAY | SEB | LBH | AUS; 8 | WGL | MOS | LIM | ELK | VIR | LGA | PET | | 27th | 23 | |
| 2018 | Wright Motorsports | GTD | Porsche 911 GT3 R | Porsche 4.0 L Flat-6 | DAY | SEB | MOH; 11 | BEL; 9 | WGL | MOS; 10 | LIM | ELK | VIR | LGA | | | 27th | 81 | |
| 2018 | Park Place Motorsports | GTD | Porsche 911 GT3 R | Porsche 4.0 L Flat-6 | | | | | | | | | | | PET; 13 | | 27th | 81 | |

Sporting positions
| Preceded by Frank Stippler | Porsche Supercup champion 2004 | Succeeded by Alessandro Zampedri |
