= Marino Franchitti =

British racing driver (born 1978)

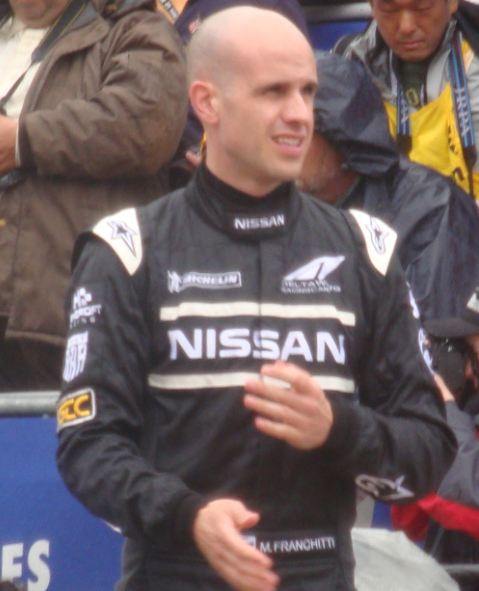
- Franchitti at Le Mans in 2012
- Nationality: (Scotland) Scottish
- Born: Marino Alessandro Cesare Franchitti; 7 July 1978 (age 48) Bathgate, West Lothian, Scotland
- Categorisation: FIA Gold (until 2013, 2020–); FIA Platinum (2014–2019)

24 Hours of Le Mans career
- Years: 2005, 2009–2010, 2012–2013, 2016
- Teams: Panoz Motorsports; Drayson Racing; Highcroft Racing
- Best finish: 25th (2010)
- Class wins: 0

Marino Alessandro Cesare Franchitti (born 7 July 1978) is a British racing driver, and the younger brother of Dario Franchitti. He has spent the majority of his career racing in sports cars and grand tourers, with a career highlight of winning the 2014 12 Hours of Sebring.

== Racing career ==
Born in Bathgate, West Lothian, Scotland, Franchitti began his career in the mid/late 1990s, initially finding his feet in Formula Ford 1600, competing in The Champion of Oulton series against circuit specialists such as Alaric Gordon (Champion 1999, 2001 and 2018). These were times for learning, and initially, results were poor, and it was not clear that Marino had the talent to succeed. He moved on to Formula Vauxhall in 1998.

In 2001, Franchitti began driving sports cars and won the GTO Championship in the British GT Championship series. He joined his brother in America in 2002, and drove in Grand Am and the American Le Mans Series, winning one race in the LMP 675 class.

In 2003, Franchitti was a development driver for Scuderia Ecosse's Ferrari 360 effort, racing with the team at the 12 Hours of Sebring. In 2004, he was a driver for the Panoz Esperante factory team in ALMS, as well as making a few Le Mans Series starts in a Porsche. He continued with the Panoz works outfit for the 2005 season, driving in the 24 Hours of Le Mans.

In 2006, Franchitti returned to Scuderia Ecosse for their effort in FIA GT as well as making assorted other appearances in high-profile sports car endurance races, including the 24 Hours of Daytona for SAMAX Motorsport.

In 2007, Franchitti signed a full-season deal to join his brother at Andretti Green Racing and to be the full-time driver for their new ALMS P2 class Acura entry with teammate Bryan Herta. Dario Franchitti, Tony Kanaan, and Herta teamed up to win the P2 class in the first outing for the team and the car: the 2007 12 Hours of Sebring. Marino started with the team at the next race in St. Petersburg. Both Franchitti brothers left the team after the 2007 season, and while Dario went to NASCAR, Marino continued in the ALMS, switching to Dyson Racing's Porsche RS Spyder, partnering with Butch Leitzinger.

Franchitti remained with the team for 2009, which fielded a Mazda powered Lola B09/86. He moved to Highcroft Racing for three events in 2010.

In 2011, Franchitti finished second at the Twelve Hours of Sebring in the Highcroft Racing Honda Performance Development ARX-01e, which turned out to be the car's first and only race. He made an end-of-year start with Level 5 Motorsports in one of its Honda Performance Development ARX-01g's at the Petit Le Mans.

For 2012, Franchitti was confirmed as the first driver of the Highcroft Racing DeltaWing, which ran as the 56th and unclassified entrant in the 2012 24 Hours of Le Mans. He also drove for the PR1/Mathasian Motorsports PC team in select races, winning in his class at Mid-Ohio.

In 2013, Franchitti was hired by Level 5 Motorsports to drive an HPD ARX-03b for the 2013 12 Hours of Sebring. Franchitti won the P2 class with Scott Tucker and Ryan Briscoe and came sixth overall. Later, Level 5 signed on Franchitti for a full-season effort in P2.

== Media career ==
Franchitti portrayed racer Eugenio Castellotti in the 2023 film Ferrari.

== Personal life ==
Franchitti is the son of Marina and George Franchitti, both born in Scotland. He is of Italian heritage, from the town of Cassino in Southern Italy.

Franchitti is married to Holly Mason, the second daughter of Pink Floyd drummer Nick Mason and a racer of historic cars herself. In June 2017, one month before the Silverstone Classic car festival, Marino and Holly were involved in a car crash when her pink Austin A35 car flipped twice a corner of the British Grand Prix track, a racing circuit during a practice drive. Holly was pulled out of the wreckage and was unscathed, while Marino sustained minor injuries.

Marino and Dario Franchitti are also cousins of fellow Scottish racing driver Paul di Resta, and are friends off the track with Allan McNish.

== Motorsports career results ==
=== Complete British GT Championship results ===
(key) (Races in bold indicate pole position)

Year	Team	Car	Class	1	2	3	4	5	6	7	8	9	10	11	12	13	DC	Points
2001	Parr Motorsport	Porsche 996 GT3-RS	GTO	SIL; 1; 9	SNE; 1; 3	**DON**; **1**; 5	**OUL**; **1**; 4	CRO; 1; 4	ROC; 1; 4	CAS; 1 Ret	BRH; 1; 5	DON; 1; 5	**KNO**; **1**; 2	**THR**; **1**; 3	**BRH**; **1**; 3	**SIL**; **1**; 6	1st	?

=== 12 Hours of Sebring results ===
Year	Team	Co-drivers	Car	Class	Laps	Pos.	Class pos.
2002	(United States) MSB Motorsport	(Germany) Ralf Kelleners	Ferrari 360 Modena GT	GT	12	DNF	DNF
2003	(United States) Risi Competizione	(United Kingdom) Kevin McGarrity	Ferrari 360 Modena GTC	GT	243	DNF	DNF
2004	(United States) Rand Racing	(United States) Derek Hill (United States) Andy Lally	Lola B2K/40-Nissan	LMP2	12	DNF	DNF
2005	(Netherlands) Spyker Squadron	(Netherlands) Peter van Merksteijn Sr. (Netherlands) Frans Munsterhuis	Spyker C8 Spyder GT2-R	GT2	18	DNF	DNF
2008	(United States) Dyson Racing	(United States) Butch Leitzinger (United States) Andy Lally	Porsche RS Spyder Evo	LMP2	351	**2nd**	**2nd**
2009	(United States) Dyson Racing Team	(United States) Butch Leitzinger (United Kingdom) Ben Devlin	Lola B08/86-Mazda	LMP2	149	DNF	DNF
2010	(United States) Patrón Highcroft Racing	(Australia) David Brabham (France) Simon Pagenaud	HPD ARX-01C	LMP2	349	5th	**2nd**
2011	(United States) Highcroft Racing	(Australia) David Brabham (France) Simon Pagenaud	HPD ARX-01e	LMP1	332	**2nd**	**2nd**
2013	(United States) Level 5 Motorsports	(United States) Scott Tucker (Australia) Ryan Briscoe	HPD ARX-03b	P2	346	6th	**1st**
2014	(United States) Chip Ganassi Racing with Felix Sabates	(United States) Scott Pruett (Mexico) Memo Rojas	Riley Mk XXVI-Ford	P	291	**1st**	**1st**

=== 24 Hours of Le Mans results ===
Year	Team	Co-drivers	Car	Class	Laps	Pos.	Class pos.
2005	(United States) Panoz Motor Sports	(France) Patrick Bourdais (United States) Bryan Sellers	Panoz Esperante GT-LM	GT2	185	DNF	DNF
2009	(United Kingdom) Drayson Racing	(United Kingdom) Paul Drayson (United Kingdom) Jonny Cocker	Aston Martin V8 Vantage GT2	GT2	272	DNF	DNF
2010	(United States) Highcroft Racing	(Australia) David Brabham (Germany) Marco Werner	HPD ARX-01C	LMP2	296	25th	9th
2012	(United States) Highcroft Racing	(Germany) Michael Krumm (Japan) Satoshi Motoyama	DeltaWing-Nissan		75	DNF	DNF
2013	(United States) Level 5 Motorsports	(United States) Scott Tucker (Australia) Ryan Briscoe	HPD ARX-03b	LMP2	242	NC	NC
2016	(United States) Ford Chip Ganassi Team UK	(United Kingdom) Andy Priaulx (United Kingdom) Harry Tincknell	Ford GT	GTE; Pro	306	40th	9th

=== Complete V8 Supercar results ===
Year	Team	No.	Car	1	2	3	4	5	6	7	8	9	10	11	12	13	14	15	16	17	18	19	20	21	22	23	24	25	26	27	28	Pos	Points
2011	Lucas Dumbrell Motorsport	30	Holden VE Commodore	YMC; R1	YMC; R2	ADE; R3	ADE; R4	HAM; R5	HAM; R6	PER; R7	PER; R8	PER; R9	WIN; R10	WIN; R11	HDV; R12	HDV; R13	TOW; R14	TOW; R15	QLD; R16	QLD; R17	QLD; R18	PHI; R19	BAT; R20	SUR; R21; Ret	SUR; R22; Ret	SYM; R23	SYM; R24	SAN; R25	SAN; R26	SYD; R27	SYD; R28	NC	0

=== 24 Hours of Daytona ===
Year	Team	Car	Co-drivers	Laps	Class	Pos.	Class pos.
2012	SpeedSource	Mazda RX-8 GT 2.0L 3-Rotor	(United States) Jonathan Bomarito (Canada) James Hinchcliffe (United States) Sylvain Tremblay	722	GT	16	6

=== Complete FIA World Endurance Championship results ===
(key) (Races in bold indicate pole position; races in italics indicate fastest lap)

Year	Entrant	Class	Car	Engine	1	2	3	4	5	6	7	8	9	Rank	Points
2016	Ford Chip Ganassi Team UK	LMGTE Pro	Ford GT	Ford EcoBoost 3.5 L Turbo V6	SIL; 4	SPA; 2	LMS; 10	NÜR; 12	MEX; 5	COA; 4	FUJ	SHA	BHR	13th	54.5

=== IMSA WeatherTech SportsCar Championship series results ===
Year	Team	Class	Make	Engine	1	2	3	4	5	6	7	8	9	10	11	Rank	Points
2014	Chip Ganassi Racing	P	Ford EcoBoost Riley DP	Ford Ecoboost 3.5 L V6 Turbo	DAY; 8	SEB; 1	LBH	LGA	DET	WGL	MOS	IMS	ELK	COA	PET	29th	60
2017	Mazda Motorsports	P	Mazda RT24-P	Mazda MZ-2.0T 2.0 L Turbo I4	DAY	SEB; 8	LBH	COA	DET	WGL; 9	MOS	ELK	LGA	PET		27th	45
2018	Mazda Team Joest	P	Mazda RT24-P	Mazda MZ-2.0T 2.0 L Turbo I4	DAY	SEB	LBH	MOH	DET	WGL	MOS	ELK	LGA	PET; 3		48th	30

* Season still in progress
