= Aston Martin Vantage GT2 =

Aston Martin V8 Vantage GT2
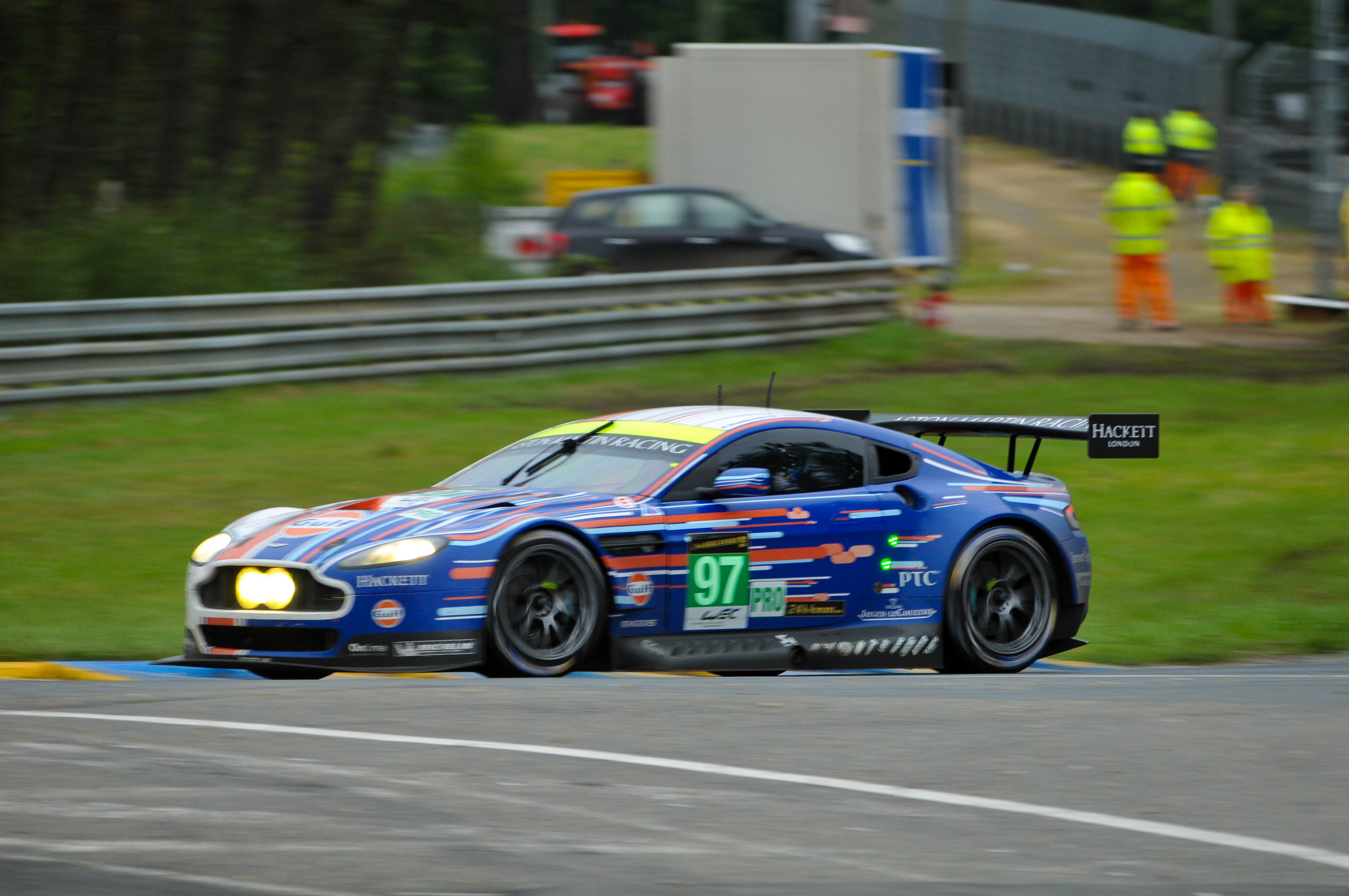
- The No. 97 V8 Vantage GTE at the 2013 24 Hours of Le Mans
- Category: LM GTE
- Constructor: Aston Martin (Prodrive)
- Successor: Aston Martin Vantage GTE

Technical specifications
- Chassis: Bonded aluminium chassis with carbon fibre panels
- Suspension (front): Double wishbone with adjustable Koni dampers
- Suspension (rear): Double wishbone with adjustable Koni dampers
- Engine: Aston Martin (Jaguar AJ37) 4,475 cc (4.5 L; 273.1 cu in), all aluminium, 32 valve 90° V8, naturally aspirated, 450 bhp (336 kW; 456 PS), 500 N⋅m (369 lb⋅ft), FMR
- Transmission: 6-speed sequential manual
- Weight: FIA 1,150 kg (2,540 lb); ACO 1,175 kg (2,590 lb)
- Fuel: Total Excellium 98 unleaded Total Quartz 9000 lubricants

Competition history
- Notable entrants: (United Kingdom) Aston Martin Racing (United Kingdom) Drayson Racing (United Kingdom) TF Sport (United Kingdom) Beechdean AMR
- Debut: 2008 Grand Prix of Long Beach

The Aston Martin Vantage GT2 is the most powerful racing variant of the Aston Martin V8 Vantage family. The Vantage GT2 is based on the V8 engined Aston Martin Vantage road car but is designed to run on both standard race fuel or E85 bio-ethanol. The name changed to Vantage GTE in 2012 following the regulation changed.

== Development ==
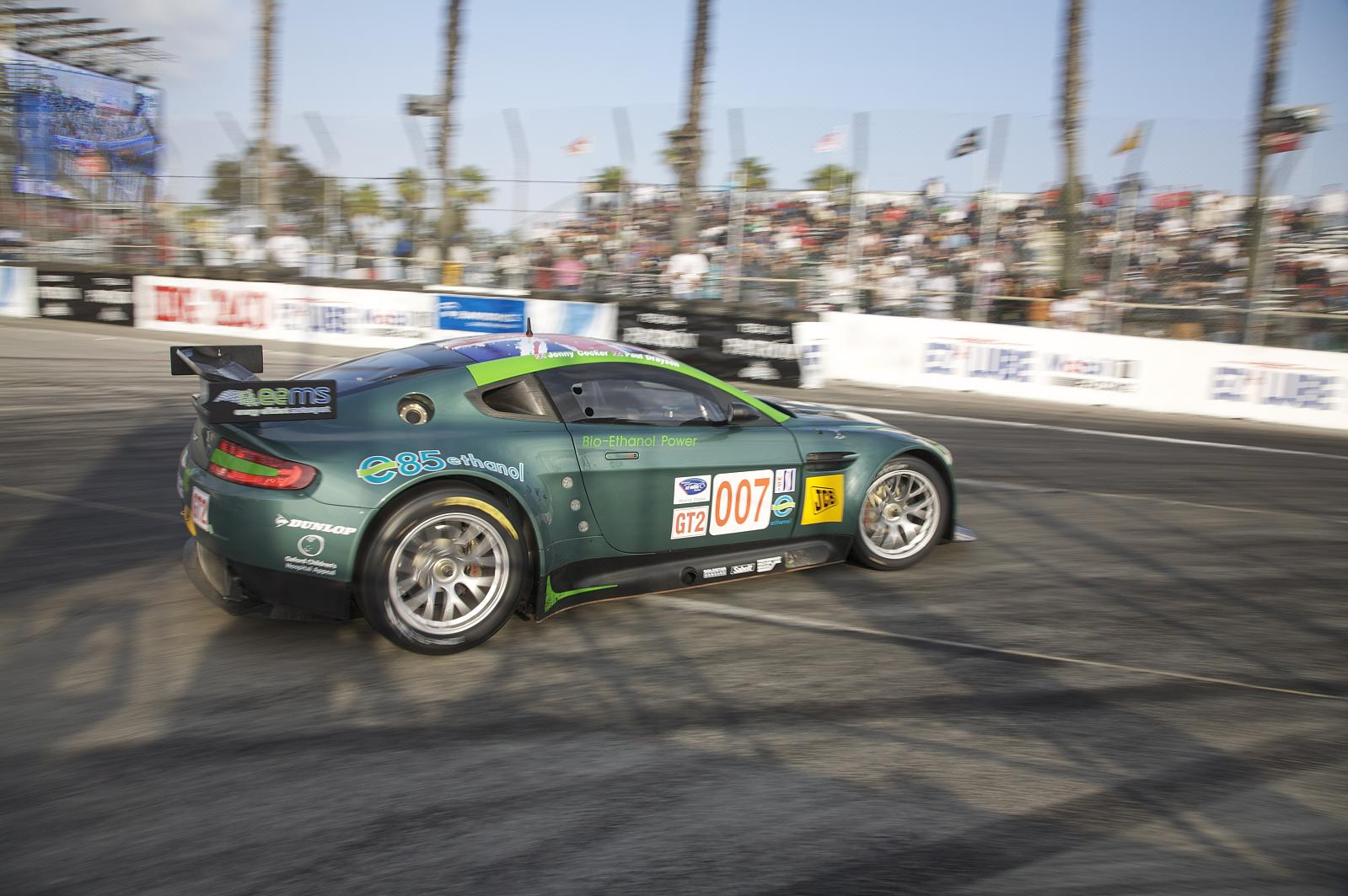
Drayson-Barwell's V8 Vantage GT2 at the car's debut, the 2008 American Le Mans Series at Long Beach.

Debuting in 2008 the GT2 is designed to meet FIA and ACO GT2 class regulations, the Vantage will become a customer car for use in the FIA GT Championship, American Le Mans Series, Le Mans Series, and 24 Hours of Le Mans.

The Aston Martin Vantage GT2's engine is a modified version of the standard 4.3-litre AJ37 V8 from the road car. The larger 4.5-litre engine retains the road car's cylinder block, heads and crankshaft, but uses competition components, including cylinder heads, con-rods, valves, camshafts and a racing exhaust system. The developed engine features a dry sump lubrication system allowing the engine to be positioned low in the chassis, for an optimised centre of gravity.

The car uses the original bonded aluminium chassis supplied by Aston Martin, but uses carbon fibre panels (exc roof) and features front splitter, rear diffuser, rear wing and a flat floor.

The V8 Vantage GT2 has been tuned to be capable of running E85 ethanol or normal racing fuel, dependent on the racing series.

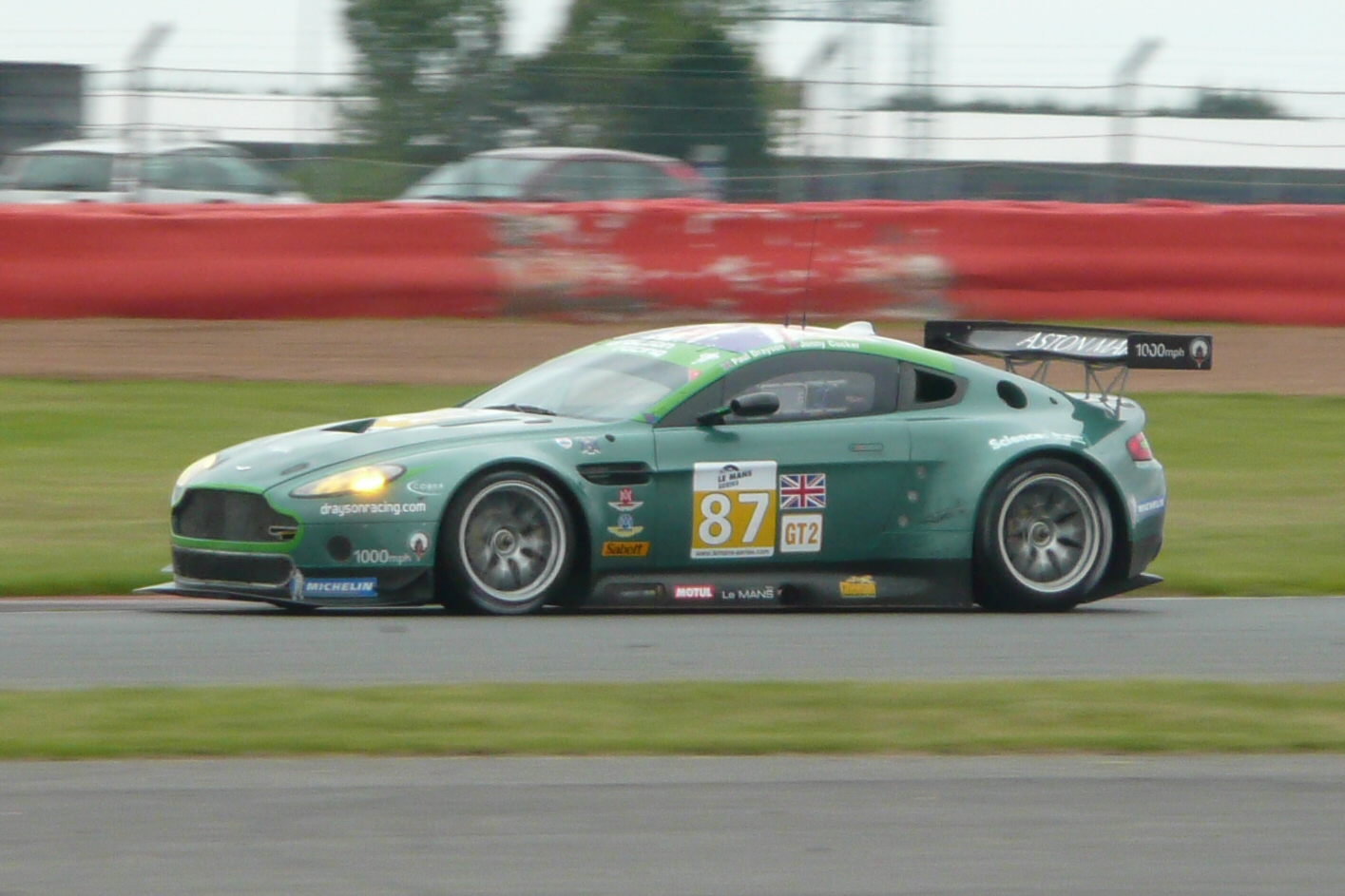
Drayson Racing Aston Martin Vantage GT2 racing in the Le Mans Series at Silverstone Circuit in 2009.

Aston Martin Racing has confirmed the entry of two upgraded GTE-Spec Vantage GT2s in the inaugural World Endurance Championship with a works team. Both the upgraded cars will debut in tests in January. They are reported to 'wear' Gulf liveries, much like those of the GT and Prototypes of Aston Martin have before.

A total of 9 chassis were built.

== Racing history ==
Aston Martin V8 Vantage GT2 saw its racing debut at the 2008 Grand Prix of Long Beach, driven by Paul Drayson, a former Minister of State in the United Kingdom, and Jonny Cocker, 2004 British GT Champion. The car will also be run on E85 fuel.

James Watt Automotive ran the V8 Vantage GT2 in the Le Mans Series 2008, although the car failed to make the start of its debut race due to mechanical problems.

Drayson Racing ran the V8 Vantage GT2 in the Le Mans Series 2009.

It was confirmed that the JLOC would use a V8 Vantage GT2 in 2010 Super GT season. The Car was run under the name Aspeed triple A Vantage GT2

JMW Motorsport ran the V8 Vantage GT2 in the Le Mans Series 2010.

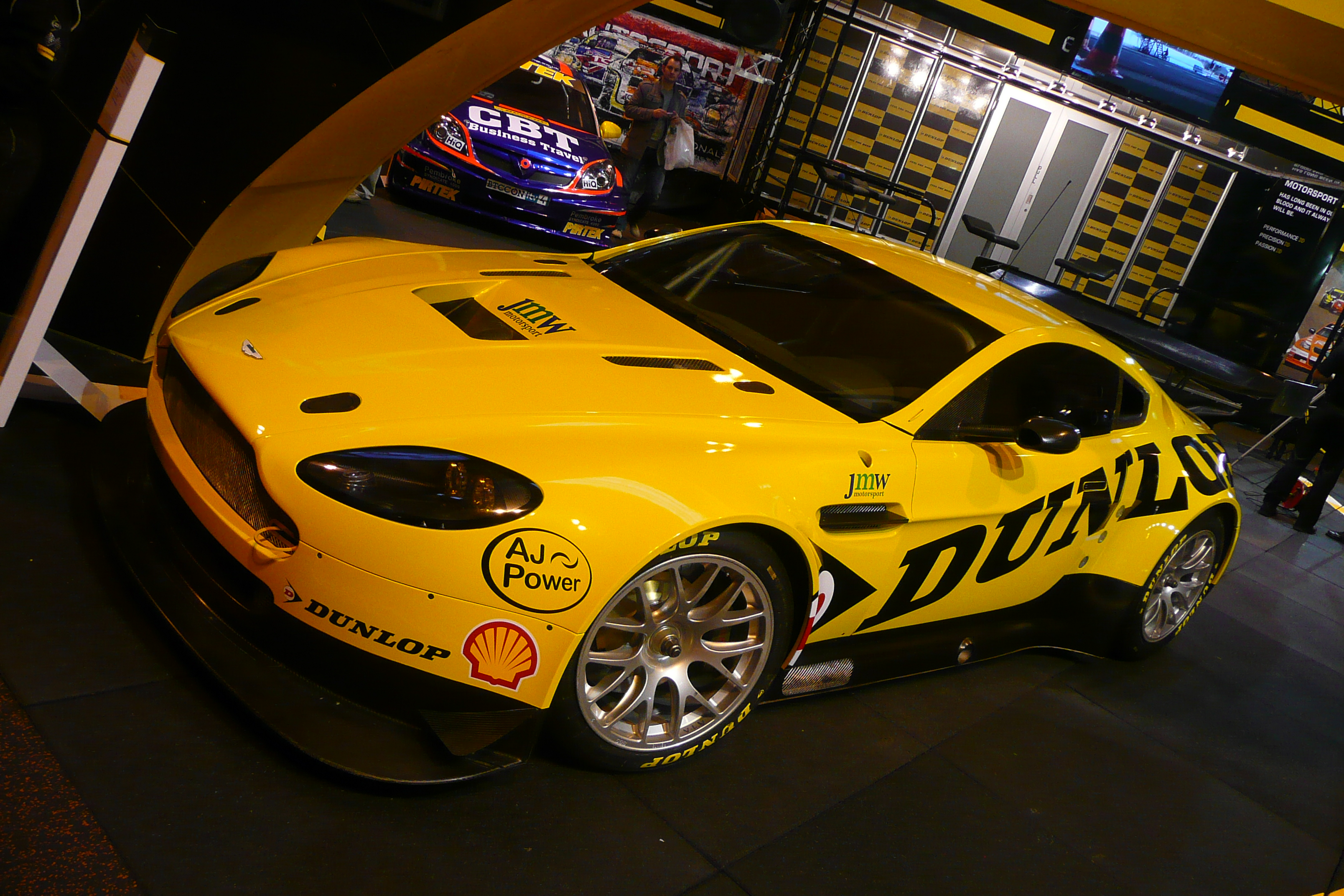
JMW Motorsport Aston Martin Vantage GT2 at Autosport International in 2010.

Aston Martin Vantage GT2's have also raced in many other series including the Le Mans Series and Intercontinental Le Mans Cup. Two Vantages also raced at the 2011 24 Hours of Le Mans: Jota Racing AMR and Gulf AMR Middle East. Both cars ultimately retired, one with mechanical issues and the other after losing control and spinning off the circuit, injuring the driver Mark Wainwright and damaging the car too seriously to continue.

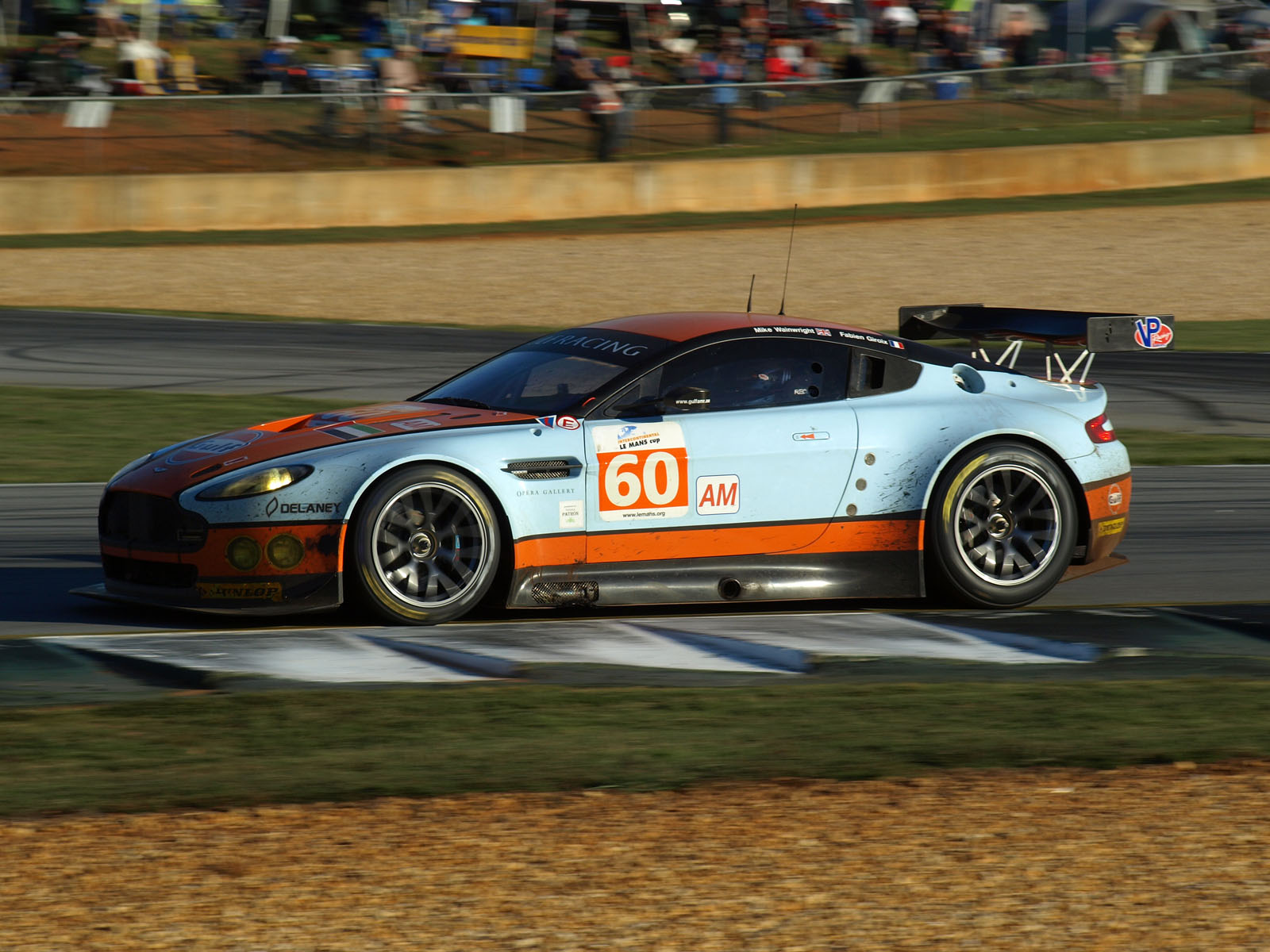
Gulf AMR Middle East Vantage GT2 - Petit Le Mans 2011

== Upgrades and GTE Version ==
For the 2012 season, Aston Martin Racing returned to a GT based program, after an ill-fated attempt the previous season with their LMP1 class petrol-powered contender, the AMR-One. With the Vantage GT2's specification varying slightly from the updated Le Mans GT2 (now GTE) regulations, development took place with the car relaunched as the Vantage GTE.

=== Major upgrades ===
Primarily, this focussed on serviceability, a major drawback on the outgoing Vantage GT2. This included creating a new modular construction implementing a series of detachable bars in the front structure, allowing the engine to be pulled straight out of the car. This now allows the engine change process to be completed in less than an hour without any effect on suspension settings, unlike the old configuration, which could take upwards of four hours. The rear suspension and subframe have also been modified to aid serviceability. To increase safety, the fuel cell has been repositioned within the roll cage to reduce the risk of damage to its structure in an accident.

=== Secondary upgrades ===
Other upgrades include reductions in weight throughout, including weight reductions for many individual components such as the battery.

Improvements also included a new CFD-derived front-bumper, side skirt and rear wing - the latter an evolution of the Le Mans aero package which the Automobile Club de l'Ouest allowed the Aston Martin Racing team to run on the car for the entire season - "Aston Martin Vantage: The rear wing used at Le Mans in 2011 will be used during all the 2012 season with a 15 mm gurney and at Le Mans 2012 without gurney". Modifications also improved cooling for the driver, a significant concern on the old model, which plagued Drayson-Barwell's 2008 ALMS season.

== Complete Competition results ==
=== Complete American Le Mans Series results ===
Results in bold indicate pole position. Results in italics indicate fastest lap.

Year	Entrant	Class	Drivers	No.	1	2	3	4	5	6	7	8	9	10	11	Points	Pos
Year	Entrant	Class	Drivers	No.	(Florida) SEB	(Florida) STP	(California) LBH	(Utah) MIL	(Connecticut) LRP	(Ohio) MOH	(Wisconsin) ELK	(Canada) MOS	(Michigan) BEL	(Georgia (U.S. state)) ATL	(California) LGA	Points	Pos
**2008**	(United Kingdom) Drayson-Barwell	GT2	(United Kingdom) Paul Drayson	007			11	RET	RET	10	RET	8	RET	RET	8	24	9th
**2008**	(United Kingdom) Drayson-Barwell	GT2	(United Kingdom) Jonny Cocker	007			11	RET	RET	10	RET	8	RET	RET	8	24	9th
**2008**	(United Kingdom) Drayson-Barwell	GT2	(United Kingdom) Darren Turner	007										RET		24	9th
					(Florida) SEB	(Florida) STP	(California) LBH	(Utah) MIL	(Connecticut) LRP	(Ohio) MOH	(Wisconsin) ELK	(Canada) MOS	(Georgia (U.S. state)) ATL	(California) LGA		Points	Pos
**2009**	(United Kingdom) Drayson Racing	GT2	(United Kingdom) Paul Drayson (United Kingdom) Jonny Cocker (United Kingdom) Rob Bell	007	RET											0	NC
					(Florida) SEB	(California) LBH	(Connecticut) LRP	(Canada) MOS	(Ohio) MOH	(Wisconsin) ELK	(Maryland) BGP	(California) LGA	(Georgia (U.S. state)) ATL			Points	Pos
**2011**	(United Arab Emirates) Gulf AMR Middle East	GTE Am	(France) Fabien Giroix (Germany) Roald Goethe (United Kingdom) Michael Wainwright	60	RET								4			0	NC

=== Complete FIA GT Championship results ===
Results in bold indicate pole position. Results in italics indicate fastest lap.

Year	Entrant	Class	Drivers	No.	1	2	3	4	5	6	7	8	Points	Pos
Year	Entrant	Class	Drivers	No.	**SIL** **(United Kingdom)**	**ADR** **(Italy)**	**OSC** **(Germany)**	**SPA** **(Belgium)**	**BUD** **(Hungary)**	**ALG** **(Portugal)**	**PAU** **(France)**	**ZOL** **(Belgium)**	Points	Pos
**2009**	(France) Hexis Racing AMR	GT2	(Germany) Stefan Mücke	80	7		2						**10**	**7th**
**2009**	(France) Hexis Racing AMR	GT2	(France) Frédéric Makowiecki	80	7		2						**10**	**7th**

=== Complete Le Mans Series & European Le Mans Series results ===
Results in bold indicate pole position. Results in italics indicate fastest lap.

Le Mans Series
Year	Entrant	Class	Drivers	No.	1	2	3	4	5	Points	Pos
Year	Entrant	Class	Drivers	No.	**CAT** **(Spain)**	**MNZ** **(Italy)**	**SPA** **(Belgium)**	**NUR** **(Germany)**	**SIL** **(United Kingdom)**	Points	Pos
**2008**	(United Kingdom) James Watt Automotive	GT2	(South Africa) Alan van der Merwe	93	DNS				7	**2**	**13th**
**2008**	(United Kingdom) James Watt Automotive	GT2	(Belgium) Stéphane Lémeret	93	DNS					**2**	**13th**
**2008**	(United Kingdom) James Watt Automotive	GT2	(Denmark) Michael Outzen	93	DNS				7	**2**	**13th**
**2008**	(United Kingdom) James Watt Automotive	GT2	(United Kingdom) Tim Sugden	93					7	**2**	**13th**
					**CAT** **(Spain)**	**SPA** **(Belgium)**	**ALG** **(Portugal)**	**NUR** **(Germany)**	**SIL** **(United Kingdom)**	Points	Pos
**2009**	(United Kingdom) Drayson Racing	GT2	(United Kingdom) Jonny Cocker	87	8	7	10RET	13RET	14RET	**1**	**12th**
**2009**	(United Kingdom) Drayson Racing	GT2	(United Kingdom) Paul Drayson	87	8	7	10RET	13RET	14RET	**1**	**12th**
					**LEC** **(France)**	**SPA** **(Belgium)**	**ALG** **(Portugal)**	**HUN** **(Hungary)**	**SIL** **(United Kingdom)**	Points	Pos
**2010**	(United Kingdom) JMW Motorsport	GT2	(United Kingdom) Rob Bell	92	12RET	16RET	4	6	**3**	**30**	**10th**
**2010**	(United Kingdom) JMW Motorsport	GT2	(United Kingdom) Darren Turner	92	12RET	16RET	4	6	**3**	**30**	**10th**
					**LEC** **(France)**	**SPA** **(Belgium)**	**IMO** **(Italy)**	**SIL** **(United Kingdom)**	**EST** **(Portugal)**	Points	Pos
**2011**	(United Kingdom) Jota	GTE Pro	(United Kingdom) Sam Hancock	92	6RET	5	7	11	5	**24**	**7th**
**2011**	(United Kingdom) Jota	GTE Pro	(United Kingdom) Simon Dolan	92	6RET	5	7	11	5	**24**	**7th**
**2011**	(United Kingdom) Jota	GTE Pro	(United Kingdom) Chris Buncombe	92				11		**24**	**7th**
European Le Mans Series
					**LEC** **(France)**	**DON** **(United Kingdom)**	**PLM** (United States)			Points	Pos
**2012**	(United Kingdom) Gulf Racing	GTE Am	(United Kingdom) Stuart Hall	69	4					**0**	**NC**
**2012**	(United Kingdom) Gulf Racing	GTE Am	(Germany) Roald Goethe	69	4					**0**	**NC**

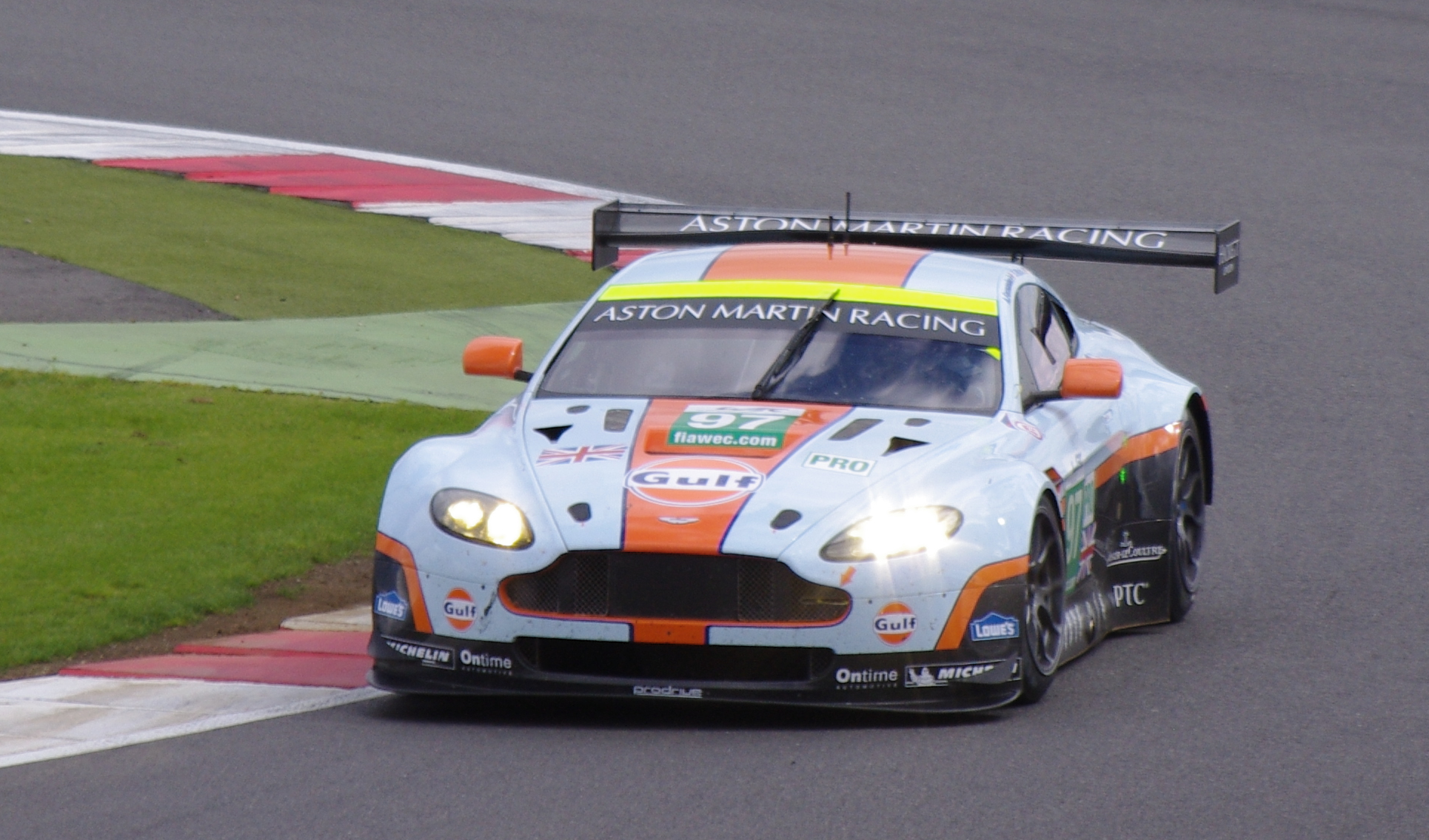
The Vantage GTE at the Silverstone round of the 2012 World Endurance Championship
