= Lola B08/60 =

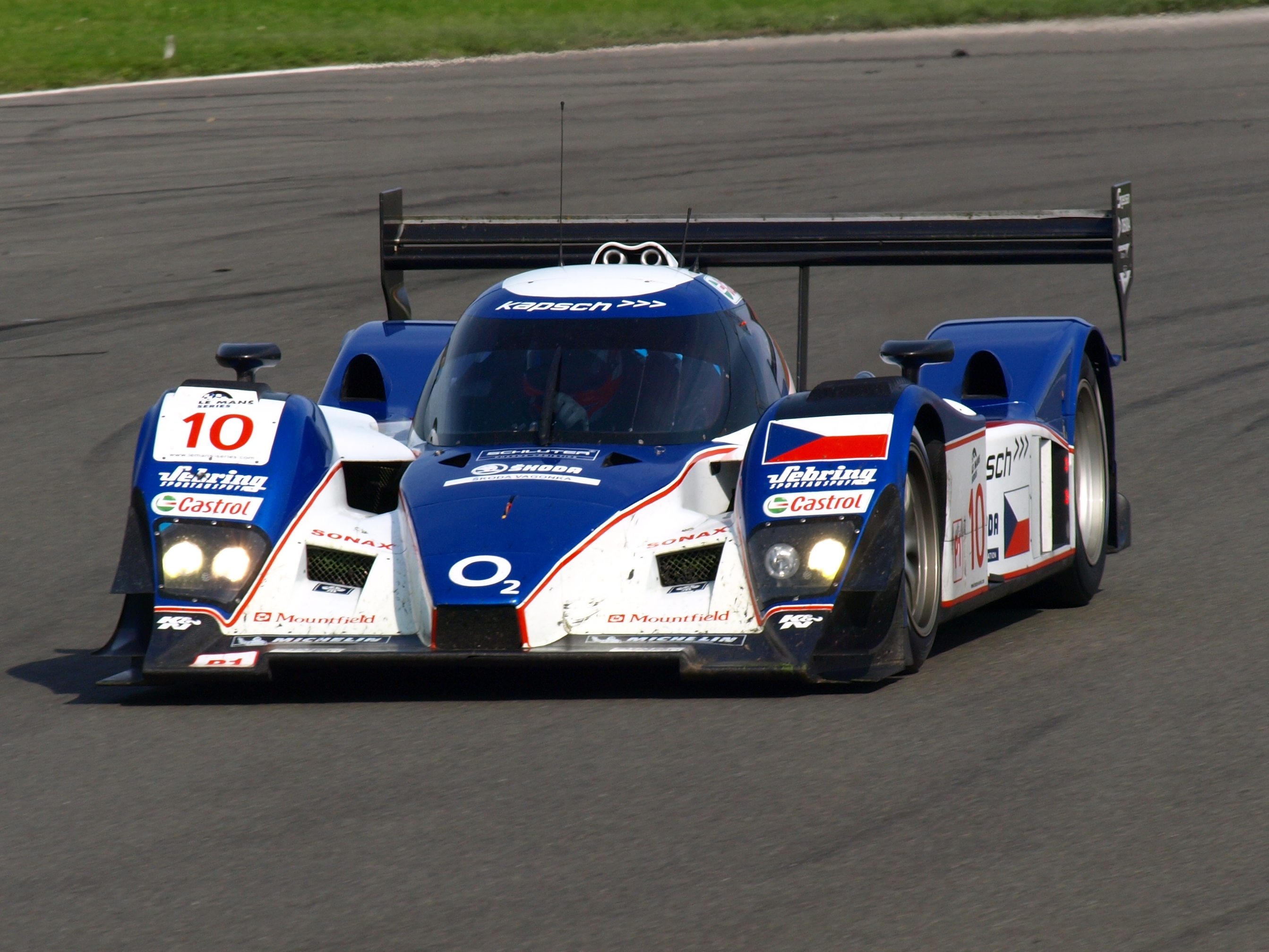
- The No. 10 B08/60 at Silverstone.
- Category: Le Mans Prototype LMP1
- Constructor: Lola Cars International
- Designer: Julian Sole

Technical specifications
- Chassis: Carbon fibre monocoque
- Suspension (front): Double wishbone, push-rod actuated coil springs over dampers
- Suspension (rear): Double wishbone, push-rod actuated coil springs over dampers
- Wheelbase: 2,890 mm (113.8 in)
- Engine: Aston Martin AM04 6.0-litre V12; Judd GV5.5 S2 5.5-litre V10; Toyota RV8KLM 3.4-litre V8; Mazda MZR-R 2.0 L Turbo I-4 naturally aspirated, mid-engined, longitudinally mounted
- Transmission: X-Trac 6-speed sequential manual
- Weight: Appr. 900 kg (2,000 lb)
- Fuel: Castrol
- Tyres: Michelin

Competition history
- Notable entrants: (Czech Republic) Charouz Racing Systems (Switzerland) Speedy Racing Team Sebah (United Kingdom) Drayson Racing
- Notable drivers: (Czech Republic) Jan Charouz, (Germany) Stefan Mücke, (Czech Republic) Tomáš Enge, (Switzerland) Marcel Fässler, (Italy) Andrea Belicchi, (France) Nicolas Prost, (United Kingdom) Paul Drayson, (United Kingdom) Jonny Cocker
- Debut: 2008 1000 km of Catalunya
Races	Wins	Poles	F/Laps
30	3	4	1
- Constructors' Championships: 0
- Drivers' Championships: 0

The Lola B08/60 is a Le Mans Prototype built by Lola Cars International. It is the first closed-cockpit sports prototype built by Lola since the 1992 T92/10. It started competition in 2008, with Aston Martin being among the first customers for their entry into the LMP1 category in Le Mans Series, albeit entering under Charouz Racing System banner.

== Development ==
Announced in late 2006, the B08/60 had been developed following not only Peugeot's introduction of their closed-cockpit coupe, the 908 HDi FAP, but also the Automobile Club de l'Ouest's (ACO) announcement of rule changes in 2010 that would have allowed only closed-cockpit LMP1s at the 24 Hours of Le Mans. Lola set out to build a car that could compete with the aerodynamic advantages of the 908 and other planned coupes, while preparing for the 2010 rule changes beforehand.

The design of the B08/60 shares many elements with its predecessor, the B06/10, with notable exception of the closed versus open cockpits. The nose and sidepods feature similar cooling and venting structures as the B06/10, while a slightly larger nose is based on the 2007-spec designs offered by Lola. Phil Tiller was in charge of the B08/60's aerodynamics, and developed the narrow cockpit. Integrated in the cockpit design are a roof-mounted air intake for the engine. The shoulders of the cockpit are also designed in a stepped fashion.

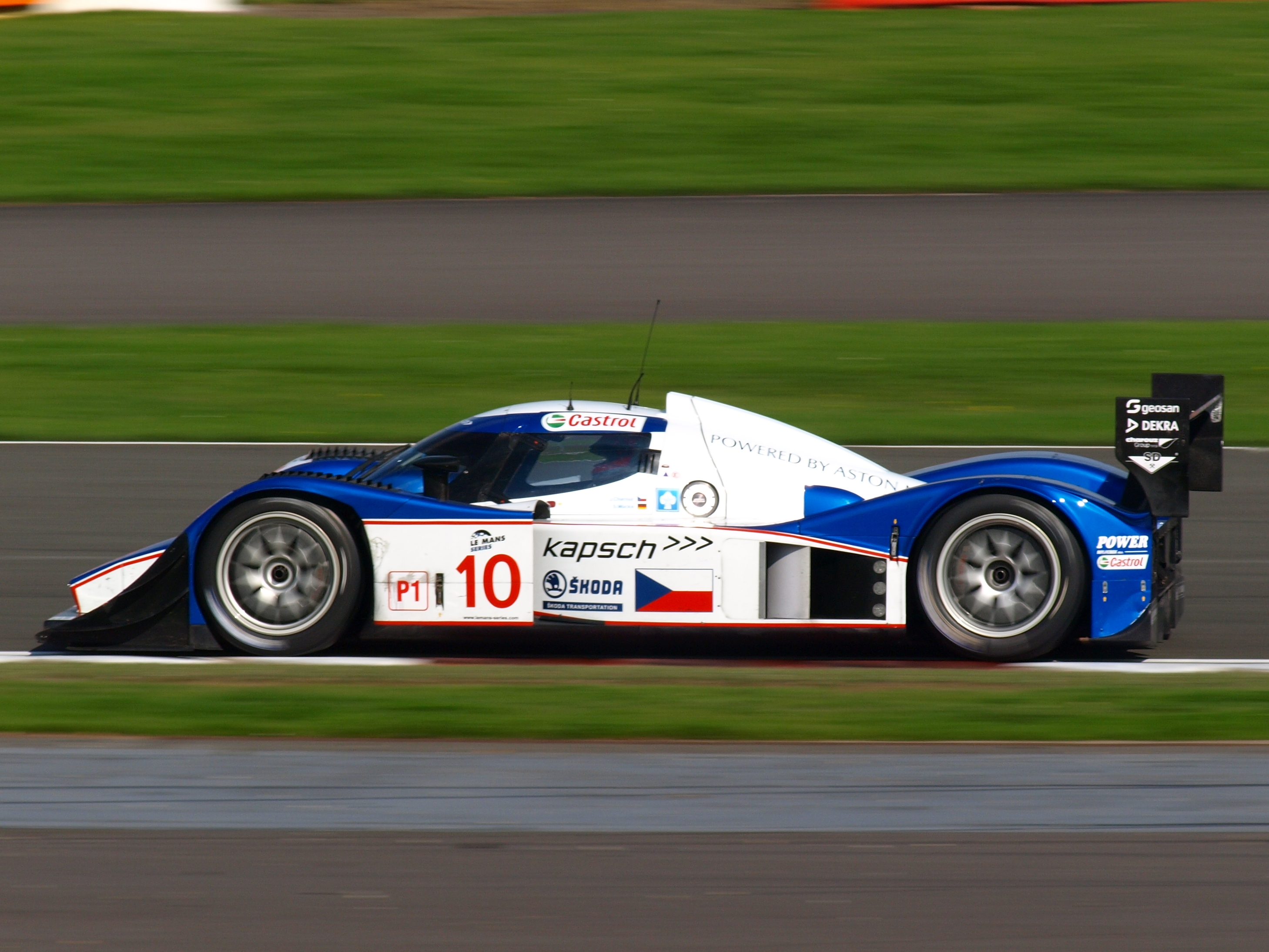
A B08/60 at the 2008 1000 km of Silverstone

The B08/60's design has also been aided by a partnership between Lola, Fluent, Inc., and AMD. The two firms provide engineering software and hardware respectively. Wind tunnel testing of scale models had been carried out since early 2007, with multiple shapes being analysed before the first car was completed in December.

During the development of the B08/60, Lola also approved the development of an LMP2 variant of the design. This car, known as B08/80, shares many elements from the B08/60, but better adapted to the LMP2 regulations which saw smaller engines, lower speeds, and generally smaller teams competing.

== Competition ==
In November 2007 Aston Martin reached an agreement with Lola to purchase the first B08/60 and installing the 6.0-litre V12 from the DBR9 race car. This is Aston Martin's first attempt at running a sports-prototype since the AMR1 in 1989. Prodrive, Aston Martin's racing partner, chose Charouz Racing System to run the new team for a full entry in the Le Mans Series and 24 Hours of Le Mans. The B08/60 was not designed with the Aston V12 engine in mind, so the standard Lola gearbox had to be replaced by a more compact X-trac 6 speed. The Lola Aston Martin gained further advantage from a regulation change that gives production-derived engines bigger air restrictors.

During the 2008 LMS season the Charouz Lola proved to be the fastest petrol car on the grid, although it still could not match the diesels. At 2008 Le Mans the B08/60 outqualified the No.1 Audi but a collision and subsequent repairs dropped them to the back. The spirited drive back to the front was rewarded with 9th overall. In Silverstone later in the year Charouz finished as high as 2nd overall, behind an Audi. Charouz Racing finished 5th in the 2008 LMS championship.

Further B08/60s will be available to other customers, with a variety of engines able to be adapted to fit the chassis. The B08/60 also forms the basis for the Lola-Aston Martin B09/60, co-developed by Lola and Prodrive.

The B08/60 would be run by the Speedy Sebah racing team throughout the 2008 and 2009 LMS season.

For 2010 Rebellion Racing ran 2 modified B08/60, dubbed the B10/60. The old Aston V12 was replaced by Rebellion 5.5 L V10. At Le Mans, lap times were 8 seconds slower compared to Charouz 2 years earlier.

The B08/60, dubbed as the Lola B09/60 Judd (also known as chassis B0960-HU03) was entered for the full American Le Mans Series season in 2009 and 2010 by Drayson Racing. It also appeared at the 2010 24 Hours of Le Mans, but under the name B10/60. It won its first race from the pole in the hands of Jonny Cocker and Paul Drayson at the Road America 500. The Drayson Lola was restricted due to ALMS rules bringing LMP1 and LMP2 cars on par, trying to achieve the same pace between both class. This car was also used as the basis of the 2012 Lola Drayson B12/69 EV, an electric Le Mans Prototype developed by Drayson Racing Technologies and Lola since 2010.

During 2012 and 2013, the Lola B08/60 ran in upgraded form as the Lola B12/60. Two teams ran the LMP1 chassis: Rebellion Racing in the FIA World Endurance Championship and Dyson Racing in the American Le Mans Series. Dyson Racing also ran a 2011-spec B11/66 in the shorter events.
