= Jonny Cocker =

British racing driver (born 1986)

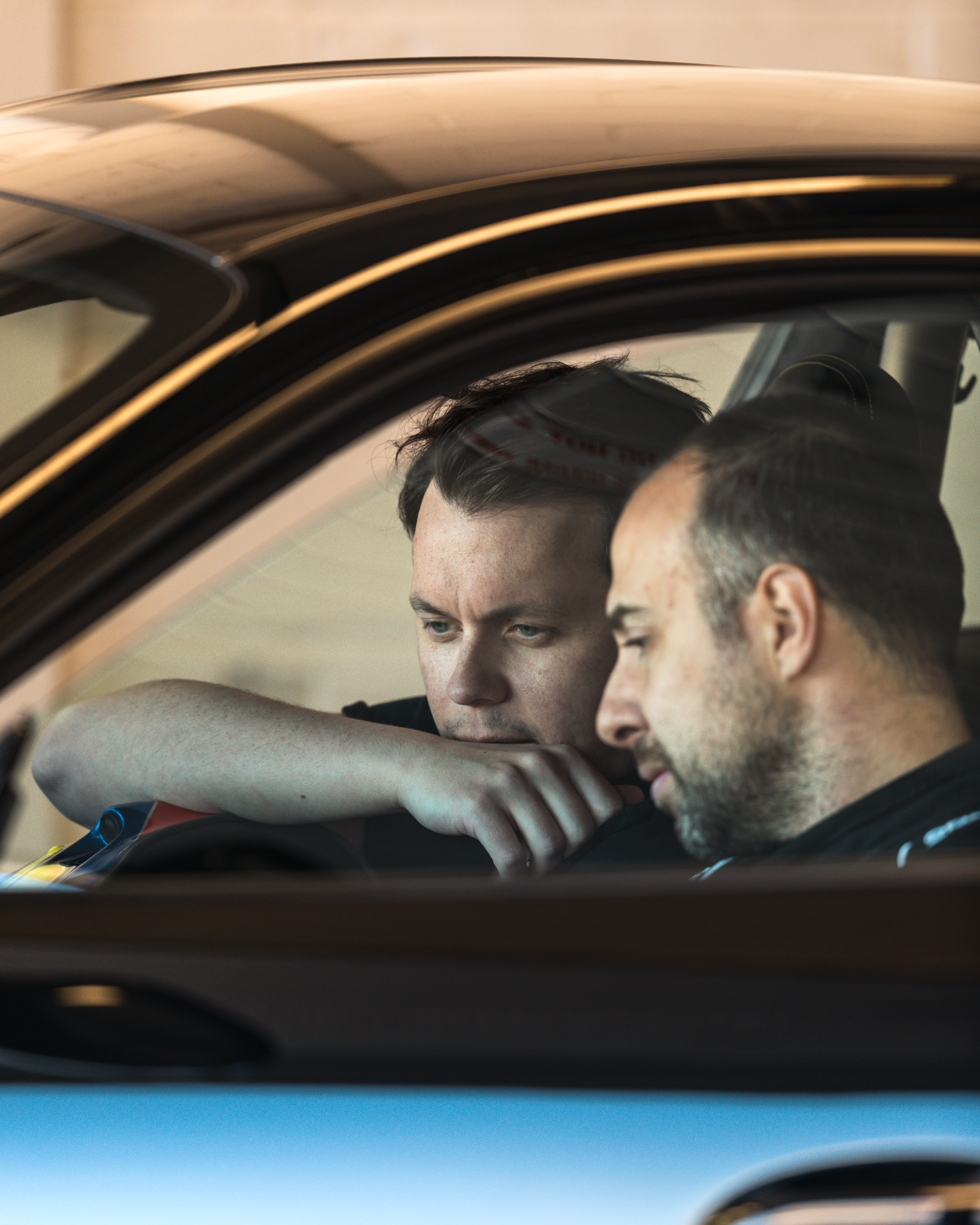
- Nationality: British
- Born: 24 August 1986 (age 40) Cheshire, England
- Categorisation: FIA Gold

Previous series
- 2012 2009 2008–10 2007 2006 2005 2004, 06–08 2003 2003–04 2001–02: Le Mans Series; American Le Mans Series; FIA GT; FIA GT3; Porsche Carrera Cup Asia; British GT Championship; Porsche Supercup; Porsche Carrera Cup GB; T Cars

Championship titles
- 2005 2004 2012: Porsche Carrera Cup Asia; British GT Championship; ELMS GTE Pro
24 Hours of Le Mans career
- Years: 2009 – 2010 - 2012
- Teams: Drayson Racing; JMW Motorsport; Barwell Motorsport; GruppeM Motorsport; Redline Racing
- Best finish: NC
- Class wins: 0

Jonathan Cocker (born 24 August 1986) is a British racing driver. In 2012, he won the ELMS GTE Pro Championship. He competed in the American Le Mans Series (ALMS) for Drayson Racing, a team run by Paul Drayson.

== Personal Life ==
Born in Cheshire to Lawrence and Geraldine Cocker. Jonny started his own company, JCR Developments, in 2014. It is a high-performance developer of aftermarket car parts, specialising predominantly in Porsche but also Lamborghini, Ferrari, Nissan GTR, Toyota GR Yaris and Ford Focus RS. Jonny and Zara Cocker (née Rimmer) were married on August 1st, 2026.

His favourite British race track is Silverstone Circuit, his favourite international race track is Road America, his favourite race car driven is the 2012 Lola B08/60 LMP1, powered by a Judd V10 engine.

== Career ==
Cocker began his racing career in T Cars in 2001, aged 14. In 2003, he progressed to the Porsche Carrera Cup Great Britain, finishing fourth in the standings. He also competed in a Porsche Supercup event at Silverstone Circuit in support of the British Grand Prix. In 2004 he became the youngest driver to win the British GT Championship, aged 18. In 2005, he won the Porsche Carrera Cup Asia.

In 2006, Cocker began racing an Aston Martin DBRS9 for Barwell Motorsport in the FIA GT3 European Championship and British GT Championship. In 2007, he shared the bio-ethanol powered car in British GT with United Kingdom Minister Paul Drayson, the pair finishing second. In 2008, Cocker graduated with Drayson-Barwell Racing to the American Le Mans Series (ALMS) racing an Aston Martin Vantage GT2.

In 2009, Cocker and Drayson made their debuts at the 24 Hours of Le Mans in the Vantage GT2, sharing with Marino Franchitti. Cocker and Drayson also drove the car in the 2009 Le Mans Series season. At the end of the season, the team switched to an LMP1 Lola B09/60-Judd, racing the car at two rounds of the ALMS and in the Asian Le Mans Series. Cocker achieved Pole and fastest lap in both races.

In 2010, Cocker and Drayson competed the season in ALMS in the Lola Judd B09/60 LMP1 bioethanol race car with Cocker (after taking pole) and Drayson achieved their first victory in ALMS during 2010 at Road America when Cocker went from fourth to first in the last four laps of the race.

Cocker came third in the ALMS LMP1 championship with Drayson Racing who came third in the LMP1 Teams Championship.

In 2012, Cocker competed with JMW Motorsport returning to the Le Mans Endurance Series in the GTE Pro Class in a Ferrari 458 Italia. Cocker won the first race at Paul Ricard, followed by pole and a second win at Donington Park which led to him being crowned ELMS GTE Pro Champion, the third title of his career.

Cocker competed for the third time at the infamous Le Mans 24hr with James Walker and Roger Wills in the JMW Motorsport 458 Ferrari Italia.

In 2012, Cocker competed with Dempsey Racing in the ALMS Laguna Seca race in their newly acquired Lola Coupe LMP2 race car.

In 2013, Cocker was the Drayson Racing development driver and clocked up 205.941 mph beating the flying kilometre record by more than 35 mph.

The record breaking car was a special low drag version of the Drayson B12 69/EV Electric Le Mans prototype car. Normally the car as two motors per wheel, a 30k Wh battery which produces 850 bhp and weighs 1,095 kg. In its world record guise it had special bodywork, a lightweight 20k Wh high powered battery and crucially it weighed less than 1,000 kg ensuring it met the one-tonne electric land speed record car rules.

Cocker secured a podium spot at the Goodwood Festival of Speed weekend in July 2013 with a third-place finish for the all-electric B12 69/EV. It was the electric hypercar's first high-profile run since it broke the FIA World Electric Land Speed Record for sub-1000 kg cars with Lord Drayson at the wheel. Back in its high downforce circuit specification, the B12 69/EV, which was driven by Cocker for the weekend and recorded a best time of 47.34 seconds in Sunday's final shootout, just 0.02 secs behind the second placed Peugeot 20 T16 that won at Pikes Peak earlier in the year. This represents a new electric record at the Goodwood Festival of Speed, over 6 seconds faster than the time set when the car made its Goodwood hill debut last year. That underlines the rapid progress being made by Drayson Racing in developing its electric powertrain technology.

== 24 Hours of Le Mans results ==
Year	Team	Co-Drivers	Car	Class	Laps	Pos.	Class Pos.
2009	(United Kingdom) Drayson Racing	(United Kingdom) Paul Drayson (United Kingdom) Marino Franchitti	Aston Martin V8 Vantage GT2	GT2	272	DNF	DNF
2010	(United Kingdom) Drayson Racing	(United Kingdom) Paul Drayson (Italy) Emanuele Pirro	Lola B09/60-Judd	LMP1	254	NC	NC
2012	(United Kingdom) JMW Motorsport	(United Kingdom) James Walker (New Zealand) Roger Wills	Ferrari 458 Italia GTC	GTE; Pro	204	DNF	DNF

Sporting positions
Preceded by Matthew Marsh	Porsche Carrera Cup Asia Champion; 2005	Succeeded by Darryl O'Young
Preceded by Tom Herridge	British GT Champion NGT; 2004	Succeeded by Andrew Kirkaldy; Nathan Kinch
Preceded by {{{before}}}	ELMS GTE Pro Champion 2012	Succeeded by {{{after}}}
