= Paul Drayson, Baron Drayson =

British businessman and former politician

The Right Honourable The Lord Drayson FREng PC
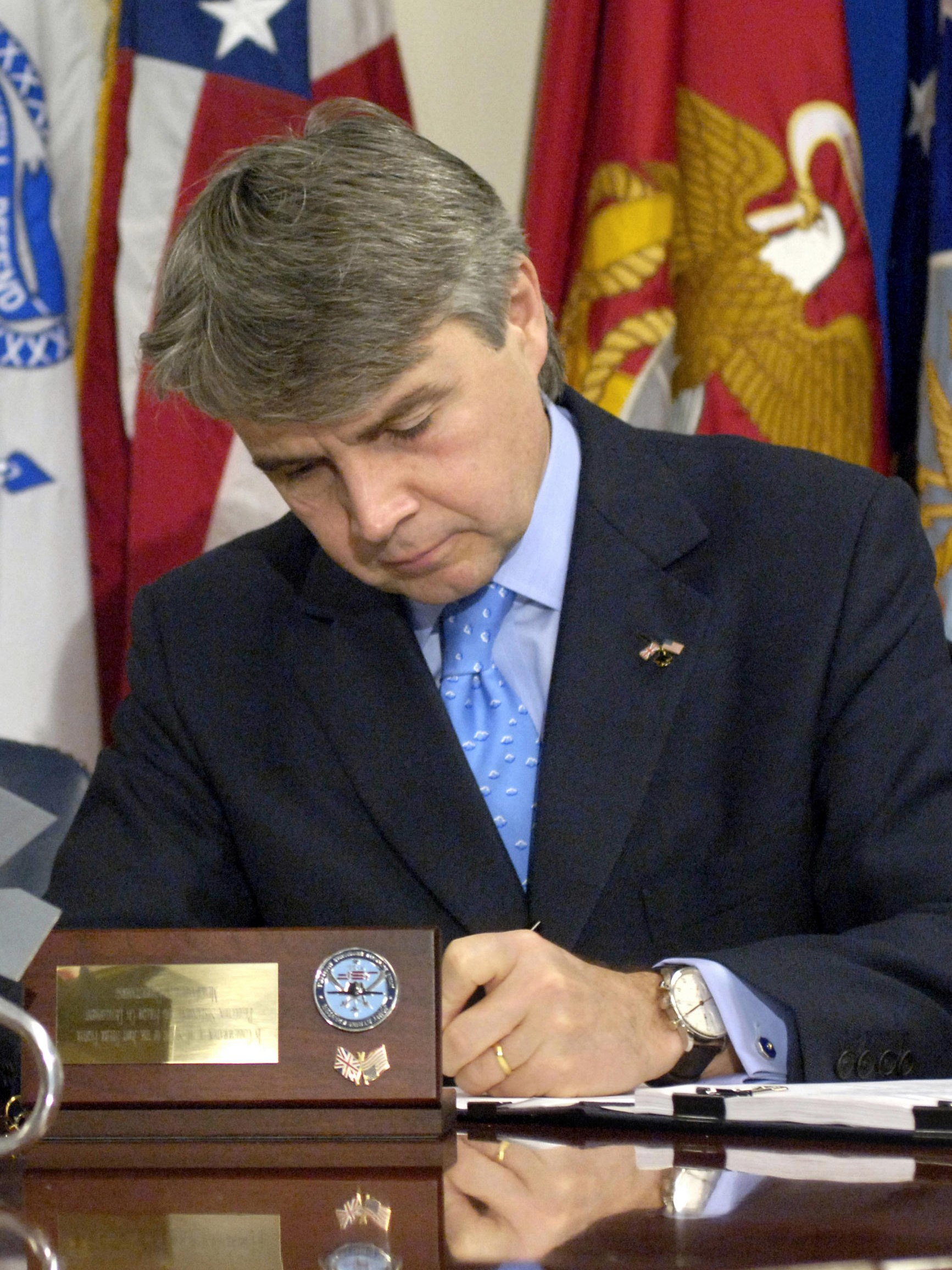
- Drayson signing a memorandum in 2006

Minister of State for Strategic Defence Acquisition Reform
- In office 8 June 2009 – 11 May 2010
- Prime Minister: Gordon Brown
- Preceded by: Position established
- Succeeded by: The Lord Astor of Hever

Minister of State for Science and Innovation
- In office 3 October 2008 – 11 May 2010
- Prime Minister: Gordon Brown
- Preceded by: Ian Pearson
- Succeeded by: David Willetts (Universities and Science)

Minister of State for Defence Equipment and Support
- In office 6 May 2005 – 7 November 2007
- Prime Minister: Tony Blair; Gordon Brown
- Preceded by: The Lord Bach
- Succeeded by: The Baroness Taylor of Bolton

Member of the House of Lords
- Lord Temporal
- Life peerage 1 June 2004

Personal details
- Born: 5 March 1960 (age 66)
- Party: Labour
- Spouse: Elspeth Bellhouse
- Relations: Brian Bellhouse (father-in-law)
- Children: 5
- Education: Aston University
- Profession: Businessman

24 Hours of Le Mans career
- Years: 2009 –
- Teams: Drayson Racing
- Best finish: 28th/NC (2010)
- Class wins: 0

Paul Rudd Drayson, Baron Drayson (born 5 March 1960) is a British businessman, amateur racing driver and Labour politician. He was Minister of Science in the Department for Business, Innovation and Skills until May 2010, where he replaced Ian Pearson. In June 2009 he was additionally appointed as Minister of State for Strategic Defence Acquisition Reform at the Ministry of Defence. After losing his ministerial positions in the General Election 2010 he decided to devote himself totally towards his motorsports company Drayson Racing Technology. He is chairman and CEO of Drayson Technologies Ltd.

== Early life and career ==
After attending St Dunstan's College, Drayson graduated from Aston University in Production Engineering, followed in 1986 by a PhD in robotics. From 1986 to 1991 he was managing director of the Lambourn Food Company. From 1992 to 1998 he was managing director of Justin de Blank Ltd.

In 1993 Drayson co-founded PowderJect Pharmaceuticals plc in Oxford which specialised in the production of vaccines, and was Chief Executive until 2003 when PowderJect was acquired by Chiron Corp.

Between 2001 and 2002, Drayson was the Chairman of the BioIndustry Association. From 2002 to 2005 he was chairman of the fundraising campaign to build a children's hospital at John Radcliffe Hospital in Oxford. Since 2003, he has been the Entrepreneur-in-Residence at the Said Business School, Oxford University.

Drayson is the current president of the Motorsport Industry Association. He is chairman and CEO of Drayson Technologies Ltd near Oxford.

== Labour Party ==
Drayson has been a large contributor to the Labour Party, with BBC News reporting in 2005 that he "was made a lord and then the UK defence procurement minister after giving New Labour more than £1m." He donated £100,000 in 2002 before PowderJect Pharmaceuticals plc was awarded a £32 million contract for a smallpox vaccine. He donated £505,000 on 17 June 2004 six weeks after being appointed to the House of Lords by Tony Blair and a further £500,000 on 21 December 2004.

== Government ==
In May 2005 Drayson replaced Lord Bach as Parliamentary Under-Secretary of State and Minister for Defence Procurement and as Government Spokesman for Defence to the House of Lords. Drayson's responsibility for defence procurement in the Ministry of Defence (MoD) was one of the most high-profile jobs in the MoD. His remit included oversight of the Defence Procurement Agency and Defence Logistics Organisation. In December 2005 Drayson published a report entitled The Defence Industrial Strategy (DIS).

On 6 March 2007 Drayson was promoted to Minister of State for Defence Equipment and Support. He oversaw the new Defence Equipment and Support Organisation. On 29 June 2007 he also became a Minister of State in the newly created Department for Business, Enterprise and Regulatory Reform, combining this with his role in the Ministry of Defence. He stood down from ministerial responsibilities on 7 November 2007. His official reason for stepping down was his wish to participate in the Le Mans race, but it has been reported that the actual reasons were being left out of the loop when Prime Minister Gordon Brown decided to disband the Defence Export Services Organisation and equipment budget deficits which would make the follow-up to the DIS largely irrelevant. His job as Defence Procurement Minister was transferred to Lady Taylor.

Drayson rejoined the Brown government as Minister of State for Science and Innovation in the Department for Innovation, Universities and Skills on 3 October 2008 following a cabinet reshuffle.

== Sensyne Health ==
Sensyne Health, floated on the AIM in 2018, uses NHS data to provide clinical insights to the pharmaceutical industry. In 2020 Drayson was accused of creating a culture of fear at Sensyne. It had data-sharing agreements with 12 NHS trusts, which were given shares in the company.

In April 2022 Drayson was ousted as chief executive, shortly after the company's financial report claimed that it would run out of money by February 2022.

== Personal life ==
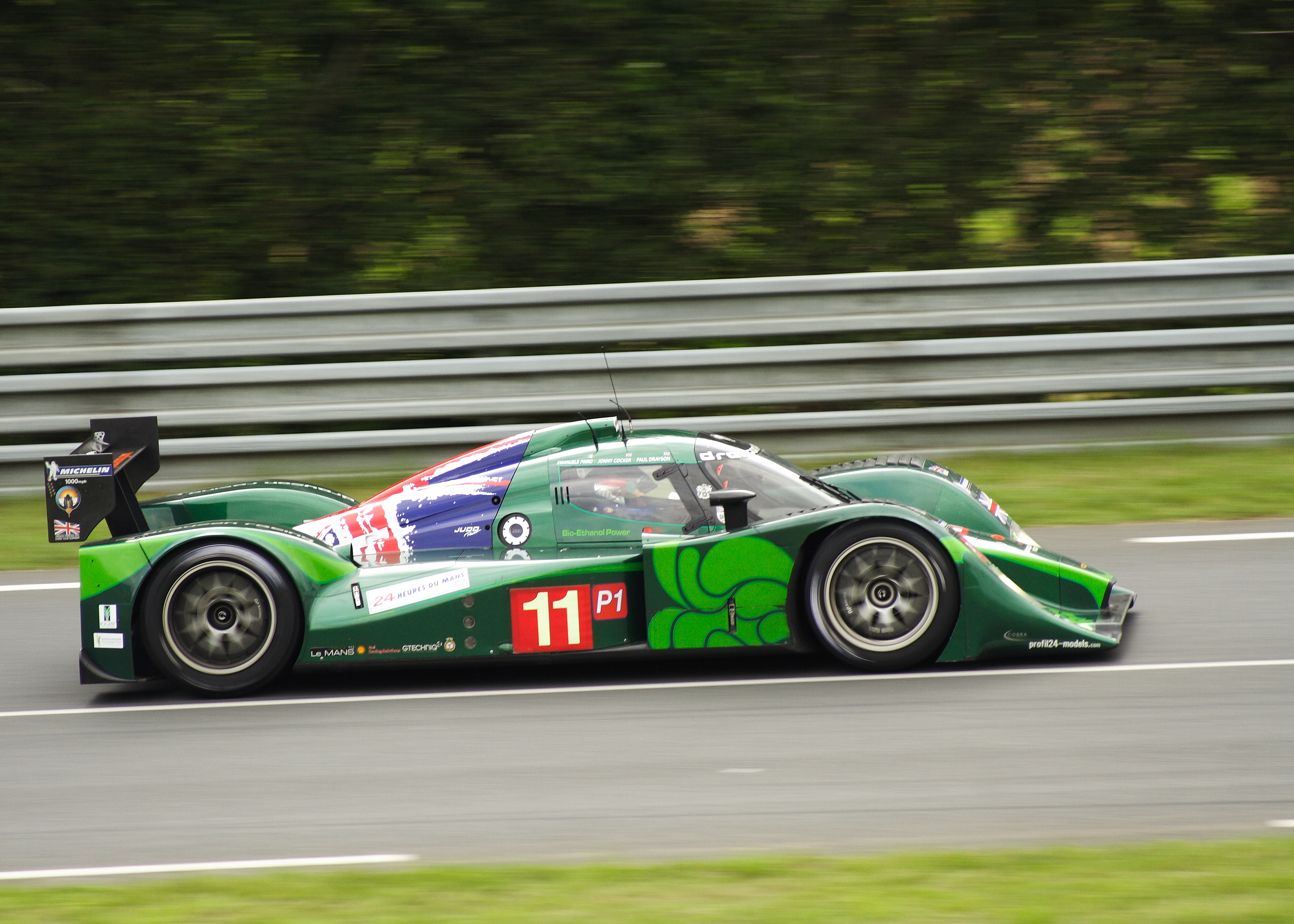
Drayson driving the Lola B09/60 at the 2010 24 Hours of Le Mans

Drayson is married to Elspeth Bellhouse, the daughter of scientist Brian Bellhouse. They have five children, and live between homes in London and Nether Lypiatt Manor near Stroud in Gloucestershire, purchased for £5.75 million in 2006 from Prince and Princess Michael of Kent.

Self-described as a "car nut and I'm a Government minister", he has owned an Aston Martin Vanquish, his wife an Aston Martin DB9, and his collection includes a Lotus Elan. He has also raced a bio-ethanol powered Aston Martin DBRS9 GT3-spec race car for Barwell Motorsport in the British GT Championship. He competed in the American Le Mans Series (ALMS).

Drayson was born blind in one eye which, under FIA rules, prevented him from acquiring an international racing licence for participation in the Le Mans 24 Hours. In light of his performance during the 2008 ALMS season and FIA rule changes, he was granted an international licence to allow him the chance of competing in the 2009 24 Hours of Le Mans. Drayson finished 37th overall and 12th in class at the race. He also competed at the 2010 event but failed to finish.

Drayson has currently competed in two seasons of the ALMS with a best finish of a win at the 2010 Road America race in a LMP Lola B09/60. For 2011, Drayson made the switch to the EV Cup, a new championship for electric cars. He will drive a Westfield iRACER.

== 24 Hours of Le Mans results ==
Year	Team	Co-Drivers	Car	Class	Laps	Pos.	Class Pos.
2009	(United Kingdom) Drayson Racing	(United Kingdom) Jonny Cocker (United Kingdom) Marino Franchitti	Aston Martin V8 Vantage GT2	GT2	272	DNF	DNF
2010	(United Kingdom) Drayson Racing	(United Kingdom) Jonny Cocker (Italy) Emanuele Pirro	Lola B09/60-Judd	LMP1	254	NC	NC

== Honours ==
Drayson was elevated to the House of Lords on 1 June 2004, made a working peer titled Baron Drayson, of Kensington in the Royal Borough of Kensington and Chelsea. In July 2011, Drayson was elected as Fellow of The Royal Academy of Engineering, the UK's national academy for engineering.

== Arms ==
Coat of arms of Paul Drayson, Baron Drayson
Adopted 2007 Coronet Coronet of a Baron Escutcheon Sable a Mullet of eight points gyronny Or and Argent between four strands of DNA issuing in saltire Argent and four strands of DNA issuing in cross Or Supporters On either side a Jaguar Sable holding in the interior forepaw a Rapier Argent hilt pommel and guard Or Motto SEEK KNOWLEDGE Badge A Jaguar rampant Sable holding in the dexter forepaw a Rapier Argent hilt pommel and guard Or Symbolism The grantee's interests in fencing and motor racing are featured as is his career in the pharmaceutical industry which is reflected in the strands of DNA.

Political offices
Preceded by The Lord Bach	Minister of State for Defence Equipment and Support; 2005–2007	Succeeded by The Baroness Taylor of Bolton
Preceded by Ian Pearson	Minister of State for Science and Innovation; 2008–2010	Succeeded by David Willetts as Minister of State for Universities and Science
New creation	Minister of State for Strategic Defence Acquisition Reform; 2009–2010	Succeeded by TBD
Orders of precedence in the United Kingdom
Preceded by The Lord Cullen of Whiteki	Gentlemen; Baron Drayson	Followed by The Lord Tunnicliffe
