= Drayson Racing =

Drayson Racing was originally going to enter their own team until starting a technical partnership with Jarno Trulli creating Trulli GP.

Drayson Racing (known as Drayson Racing Technology) was a British motor racing team founded by British businessman, amateur racing driver and Labour politician Paul Drayson to compete in the British GT Championship. Since then the team has run in the American Le Mans Series, Asian Le Mans Series and the 24 Hours of Le Mans. The team and its technology development sister company Drayson Technologies has been developing hardware for the electric racing series, FIA Formula E Championship.

In 2011, Drayson Racing announced a partnership with Lola Cars to develop an experimental prototype electric racing vehicle. Based on the Lola B12/60 chassis, the Lola-Drayson B12/69 EV would use a drivetrain developed by Drayson Racing as a testbed for future Formula E entries. The team set a new world electric land speed record for an electric vehicle under 1,000 kg (2,200 lb) at RAF Elvington in 2013. Drayson himself drove the B12/69 EV for the attempt, reaching a top speed of 204.2 mph (328.6 km/h) to break the previous record of 175 mph (282 km/h) that had stood since 1974. The company was dissolved in 2021.

== 24 Hours of Le Mans results ==
Year	Entrant	No.	Car	Drivers	Class	Laps	Pos.	Class Pos.
2009	(United Kingdom) Drayson Racing	87	Aston Martin V8 Vantage GT2	(United Kingdom) Jonny Cocker (United Kingdom) Paul Drayson (United Kingdom) Marino Franchitti	GT2	272	DNF	DNF
2010	(United Kingdom) Drayson Racing	11	Lola B09/60-Judd	(United Kingdom) Jonny Cocker (United Kingdom) Paul Drayson (Italy) Emanuele Pirro	LMP1	254	NC	NC
