= 2010 Mid-Ohio Sports Car Challenge =

The layout of Mid-Ohio Sports Car Course

The 2010 Mid-Ohio Sports Car Challenge was the sixth round of the 2010 American Le Mans Series season. It took place at Mid-Ohio Sports Car Course on August 7, 2010. The Muscle Milk Team Cytosport Porsche did not start the race after Greg Pickett destroyed the car during testing on the Thursday before the race.

== Qualifying ==
=== Qualifying result ===
Pole position winners in each class are marked in bold.

Pos	Class	Team	Driver	Lap Time	Grid
1	**LMP**	**#8 Drayson Racing**	**Jonny Cocker**	**1:10.034**	**1**
2	LMP	#16 Dyson Racing Team	Chris Dyson	1:10.966	2
3	LMP	#1 Patrón Highcroft Racing	Simon Pagenaud	1:11.360	3
4	LMP	#37 Intersport Racing	Clint Field	1:14.008	4
5	**LMPC**	**#55 Level 5 Motorsports**	**Christophe Bouchut**	**1:15.906**	**5**
6	LMPC	#52 PR1/Mathiasen Motorsports	Luis Díaz	1:16.141	6
7	LMPC	#89 Genoa Racing	Kyle Marcelli	1:16.557	7
8	LMPC	#99 Green Earth Team Gunnar	Gunnar Jeannette	1:16.573	8
9	LMPC	#36 Genoa Racing	Frankie Montecalvo	1:17.973	9
10	LMPC	#95 Level 5 Motorsports	Scott Tucker	1:18.339	10
11	LMP	#5 Libra Racing	Andrew Prendeville	1:19.351	11
12	**GT**	**#61 Risi Competizione**	**Toni Vilander**	**1:19.682**	**12**
13	GT	#62 Risi Competizione	Gianmaria Bruni	1:19.759	13
14	GT	#4 Corvette Racing	Oliver Gavin	1:20.019	14
15	GT	#3 Corvette Racing	Jan Magnussen	1:20.189	15
16	GT	#90 BMW Rahal Letterman Racing	Joey Hand	1:20.267	16
17	GT	#02 Extreme Speed Motorsports	Guy Cosmo	1:20.498	17
18	GT	#92 BMW Rahal Letterman Racing	Tommy Milner	1:20.548	18
19	GT	#45 Flying Lizard Motorsports	Patrick Long	1:20.612	19
20	GT	#01 Extreme Speed Motorsports	Scott Sharp	1:20.884	20
21	GT	#40 Robertson Racing	David Murry	1:21.771	21
22	GT	#17 Team Falken Tire	Bryan Sellers	1:21.805	22
23	GT	#75 Jaguar RSR	Marc Goossens	1:22.125	23
24	GT	#44 Flying Lizard Motorsports	Seth Neiman	1:24.848	24
25	**GTC**	**#54 Black Swan Racing**	**Jeroen Bleekemolen**	**1:24.954**	**25**
26	GTC	#48 ORBIT	Bryce Miller	1:25.260	26
27	GTC	#32 GMG Racing	James Sofronas	1:25.729	27
28	GTC	#88 Velox Motorsports	Shane Lewis	1:26.105	28
29	GTC	#23 Alex Job Racing	Bill Sweedler	1:27.059	29
30	GTC	#28 911 Design	Doug Baron	1:28.267	30
31	LMP	#12 Autocon Motorsports	No Time		31
32	GTC	#63 TRG	No Time		32
33	LMP	#6 Muscle Milk Team Cytosport	No Time		33

== Race ==
=== Race result ===
Class winners in bold. Cars failing to complete 70% of their class winner's distance are marked as Not Classified (NC).

Pos	Class	No	Team	Drivers	Chassis	Tire	Laps
Pos	Class	No	Team	Drivers	Engine	Tire	Laps
1	**LMP**	**16**	**(United States) Dyson Racing Team**	**(United States) Chris Dyson (United Kingdom) Guy Smith**	**Lola B09/86**	D	**119**
1	**LMP**	**16**	**(United States) Dyson Racing Team**	**(United States) Chris Dyson (United Kingdom) Guy Smith**	**Mazda MZR-R 2.0 L Turbo I4 (Isobutanol)**	D	**119**
2	LMP	1	(United States) Patrón Highcroft Racing	(Australia) David Brabham (France) Simon Pagenaud	HPD ARX-01C	MI	119
2	LMP	1	(United States) Patrón Highcroft Racing	(Australia) David Brabham (France) Simon Pagenaud	HPD AL7.R 3.4 L V8	MI	119
3	**LMPC**	**55**	**(United States) Level 5 Motorsports**	**(United States) Scott Tucker (France) Christophe Bouchut**	**Oreca FLM09**	MI	**115**
3	**LMPC**	**55**	**(United States) Level 5 Motorsports**	**(United States) Scott Tucker (France) Christophe Bouchut**	**Chevrolet LS3 6.2 L V8**	MI	**115**
4	LMP	12	(United States) Autocon Motorsports	(United States) Bryan Willman (United States) Tomy Drissi	Lola B06/10	D	114
4	LMP	12	(United States) Autocon Motorsports	(United States) Bryan Willman (United States) Tomy Drissi	AER P32C 4.0 L Turbo V8 (E85 Ethanol)	D	114
5	LMPC	52	(United States) PR1/Mathiasen Motorsports	(Mexico) Ricardo González (Mexico) Luis Díaz	Oreca FLM09	MI	114
5	LMPC	52	(United States) PR1/Mathiasen Motorsports	(Mexico) Ricardo González (Mexico) Luis Díaz	Chevrolet LS3 6.2 L V8	MI	114
6	LMPC	99	(United States) Green Earth Team Gunnar	(United States) Gunnar Jeannette (United States) Elton Julian	Oreca FLM09	MI	113
6	LMPC	99	(United States) Green Earth Team Gunnar	(United States) Gunnar Jeannette (United States) Elton Julian	Chevrolet LS3 6.2 L V8	MI	113
7	LMPC	89	(United States) Intersport Racing	(United States) Brian Wong (Canada) Kyle Marcelli	Oreca FLM09	MI	113
7	LMPC	89	(United States) Intersport Racing	(United States) Brian Wong (Canada) Kyle Marcelli	Chevrolet LS3 6.2 L V8	MI	113
8	LMPC	95	(United States) Level 5 Motorsports	(United States) Scott Tucker (United Kingdom) Andy Walace	Oreca FLM09	MI	113
8	LMPC	95	(United States) Level 5 Motorsports	(United States) Scott Tucker (United Kingdom) Andy Walace	Chevrolet LS3 6.2 L V8	MI	113
9	**GT**	**62**	**(United States) Risi Competizione**	**(Brazil) Jaime Melo (Italy) Gianmaria Bruni**	**Ferrari F430 GTE**	MI	**112**
9	**GT**	**62**	**(United States) Risi Competizione**	**(Brazil) Jaime Melo (Italy) Gianmaria Bruni**	**Ferrari 4.0 L V8 (E85 Ethanol)**	MI	**112**
10	GT	4	(United States) Corvette Racing	(Monaco) Olivier Beretta (United Kingdom) Oliver Gavin	Chevrolet Corvette C6.R	MI	112
10	GT	4	(United States) Corvette Racing	(Monaco) Olivier Beretta (United Kingdom) Oliver Gavin	Chevrolet 5.5 L V8 (E85 Ethanol)	MI	112
11	GT	92	(United States) BMW Rahal Letterman Racing	(United States) Bill Auberlen (United States) Tommy Milner	BMW M3 GT2	D	112
11	GT	92	(United States) BMW Rahal Letterman Racing	(United States) Bill Auberlen (United States) Tommy Milner	BMW 4.0 L V8 (E85 Ethanol)	D	112
12	GT	45	(United States) Flying Lizard Motorsports	(Germany) Jörg Bergmeister (United States) Patrick Long	Porsche 997 GT3-RSR	MI	112
12	GT	45	(United States) Flying Lizard Motorsports	(Germany) Jörg Bergmeister (United States) Patrick Long	Porsche 4.0 L Flat-6 (E85 Ethanol)	MI	112
13	GT	01	(United States) Extreme Speed Motorsports	(United States) Scott Sharp (United States) Johannes van Overbeek	Ferrari F430 GTE	MI	112
13	GT	01	(United States) Extreme Speed Motorsports	(United States) Scott Sharp (United States) Johannes van Overbeek	Ferrari 4.0 L V8	MI	112
14	GT	90	(United States) BMW Rahal Letterman Racing	(Germany) Dirk Müller (United States) Joey Hand	BMW M3 GT2	D	112
14	GT	90	(United States) BMW Rahal Letterman Racing	(Germany) Dirk Müller (United States) Joey Hand	BMW 4.0 L V8 (E85 Ethanol)	D	112
15	LMPC	36	(United States) Genoa Racing	(Germany) Christian Zugel (United States) Frankie Montecalvo	Oreca FLM09	MI	111
15	LMPC	36	(United States) Genoa Racing	(Germany) Christian Zugel (United States) Frankie Montecalvo	Chevrolet LS3 6.2 L V8	MI	111
16	GT	44	(United States) Flying Lizard Motorsports	(France) Patrick Pilet (United States) Seth Neiman	Porsche 997 GT3-RSR	MI	111
16	GT	44	(United States) Flying Lizard Motorsports	(France) Patrick Pilet (United States) Seth Neiman	Porsche 4.0 L Flat-6 (E85 Ethanol)	MI	111
17	GT	17	(United States) Team Falken Tire	(United States) Bryan Sellers (Germany) Wolf Henzler	Porsche 997 GT3-RSR	FAL	110
17	GT	17	(United States) Team Falken Tire	(United States) Bryan Sellers (Germany) Wolf Henzler	Porsche 4.0 L Flat-6	FAL	110
18	GT	75	(United States) Jaguar RSR	(United States) Paul Gentilozzi (Belgium) Marc Goossens	Jaguar XKRS	Y	107
18	GT	75	(United States) Jaguar RSR	(United States) Paul Gentilozzi (Belgium) Marc Goossens	Jaguar 5.0 L V8	Y	107
19	**GTC**	**54**	**(United States) Black Swan Racing**	**(United States) Tim Pappas (Netherlands) Jeroen Bleekemolen**	**Porsche 997 GT3 Cup**	Y	**106**
19	**GTC**	**54**	**(United States) Black Swan Racing**	**(United States) Tim Pappas (Netherlands) Jeroen Bleekemolen**	**Porsche 3.8 L Flat-6**	Y	**106**
20	GTC	32	(United States) GMG Racing	(United States) Bret Curtis (United States) James Sofronas	Porsche 997 GT3 Cup	Y	105
20	GTC	32	(United States) GMG Racing	(United States) Bret Curtis (United States) James Sofronas	Porsche 3.8 L Flat-6	Y	105
21	GTC	23	(United States) Alex Job Racing	(United States) Bill Sweedler (United States) Romeo Kapudija	Porsche 997 GT3 Cup	Y	105
21	GTC	23	(United States) Alex Job Racing	(United States) Bill Sweedler (United States) Romeo Kapudija	Porsche 3.8 L Flat-6	Y	105
22	GTC	48	(United States) ORBIT	(United States) Bryce Miller (United Kingdom) Luke Hines	Porsche 997 GT3 Cup	MI	105
22	GTC	48	(United States) ORBIT	(United States) Bryce Miller (United Kingdom) Luke Hines	Porsche 3.8 L Flat-6	MI	105
23	GTC	88	(United States) Velox Motorsports	(United States) Shane Lewis (United States) Jerry Vento	Porsche 997 GT3 Cup	Y	103
23	GTC	88	(United States) Velox Motorsports	(United States) Shane Lewis (United States) Jerry Vento	Porsche 3.8 L Flat-6	Y	103
24	GTC	63	(United States) TRG	(France) Henri Richard (United States) Spencer Pumpelly	Porsche 997 GT3 Cup	Y	103
24	GTC	63	(United States) TRG	(France) Henri Richard (United States) Spencer Pumpelly	Porsche 3.8 L Flat-6	Y	103
25	GTC	28	(United States) 911 Design	(United States) Loren Beggs (United States) Doug Baron	Porsche 997 GT3 Cup	Y	103
25	GTC	28	(United States) 911 Design	(United States) Loren Beggs (United States) Doug Baron	Porsche 3.8 L Flat-6	Y	103
26 DNF	LMP	37	(United States) Intersport Racing	(United States) Jon Field (United States) Clint Field	Lola B06/10	D	100
26 DNF	LMP	37	(United States) Intersport Racing	(United States) Jon Field (United States) Clint Field	AER P32C 4.0 L Turbo V8 (E85 Ethanol)	D	100
27 DNF	GT	61	(United States) Risi Competizione	(Italy) Giancarlo Fisichella (Finland) Toni Vilander	Ferrari F430 GTE	MI	100
27 DNF	GT	61	(United States) Risi Competizione	(Italy) Giancarlo Fisichella (Finland) Toni Vilander	Ferrari 4.0 L Turbo V8 (E85 Ethanol)	MI	100
28 DNF	GT	02	(United States) Extreme Speed Motorsports	(United States) Ed Brown (United States) Guy Cosmo	Ferrari F430 GTE	MI	96
28 DNF	GT	02	(United States) Extreme Speed Motorsports	(United States) Ed Brown (United States) Guy Cosmo	Ferrari 4.0 L V8	MI	96
29	GT	40	(United States) Robertson Racing	(United States) David Robertson (United Kingdom) Andrea Robertson (United States) David Murry	Ford GT-R Mk. VII	D	96
29	GT	40	(United States) Robertson Racing	(United States) David Robertson (United Kingdom) Andrea Robertson (United States) David Murry	Ford 5.0 L V8	D	96
30 DNF	GT	3	(United States) Corvette Racing	(Denmark) Jan Magnussen (United States) Johnny O'Connell	Chevrolet Corvette C6.R	MI	49
30 DNF	GT	3	(United States) Corvette Racing	(Denmark) Jan Magnussen (United States) Johnny O'Connell	Chevrolet 5.5 L V8 (E85 Ethanol)	MI	49
31 DNF	LMP	5	(United Kingdom) Libra Racing	(United States) Andrew Prendeville (United Kingdom) Chris Buncombe	Radical SR9	D	44
31 DNF	LMP	5	(United Kingdom) Libra Racing	(United States) Andrew Prendeville (United Kingdom) Chris Buncombe	Nissan (IES) 4.0 L V8	D	44
32 DNF	LMP	8	(United Kingdom) Drayson Racing	(United Kingdom) Paul Drayson (United Kingdom) Jonny Cocker	Lola B09/60	MI	39
32 DNF	LMP	8	(United Kingdom) Drayson Racing	(United Kingdom) Paul Drayson (United Kingdom) Jonny Cocker	Judd GV5.5 S2 5.5 L V10 (E85 ethanol)	MI	39
DNS	LMP	6	(United States) Muscle Milk Team Cytosport	(United States) Greg Pickett (Germany) Klaus Graf	Porsche RS Spyder Evo	MI	-
DNS	LMP	6	(United States) Muscle Milk Team Cytosport	(United States) Greg Pickett (Germany) Klaus Graf	Porsche MR6 3.4 L V8	MI	-

American Le Mans Series
Previous race: Northeast Grand Prix	2010 season	Next race: ALMS powered by eStar
