= 2010 Northeast Grand Prix =

Track map of Lime Rock Park

The 2010 American Le Mans Northeast Grand Prix was held at Lime Rock Park on July 24, 2010. It was the fifth round of the 2010 American Le Mans Series season.

== Qualifying ==
The qualifying session saw David Brabham give Highcroft Racing another overall pole. Christophe Bouchut took LMPC pole for Level 5 Motorsports, Pat Long took the GT pole for Flying Lizard Motorsports and Jeroen Bleekemolen took GTC pole for Black Swan Racing, meaning the Black Swan Porsche has been on GTC pole in all three races they have raced so far.

=== Qualifying result ===
Pole position winners in each class are marked in bold.

Pos	Class	Team	Driver	Lap Time	Grid
1	**LMP**	**#1 Patrón Highcroft Racing**	**David Brabham**	**0:58.106**	**1**
2	LMP	#6 Muscle Milk Team Cytosport	Klaus Graf	0:58.746	2
3	LMP	#16 Dyson Racing Team	Guy Smith	0:59.951	3
4	LMP	#8 Drayson Racing	Jonny Cocker	1:00.092	4
5	LMP	#37 Intersport Racing	Jon Field	1:02.922	5
6	**LMPC**	**#55 Level 5 Motorsports**	**Christophe Bouchut**	**1:03.020**	**6**
7	LMPC	#89 Genoa Racing	Kyle Marcelli	1:03.587	7
8	**GT**	**#45 Flying Lizard Motorsports**	**Patrick Long**	**1:03.904**	**8**
9	LMPC	#52 PR1/Mathiasen Motorsports	Alex Figge	1:04.082	9
10	GT	#17 Team Falken Tire	Wolf Henzler	1:04.378	10
11	GT	#62 Risi Competizione	Jaime Melo	1:04.391	11
12	GT	#3 Corvette Racing	Jan Magnussen	1:04.563	12
13	GT	#61 Risi Competizione	Mika Salo	1:04.929	13
14	GT	#4 Corvette Racing	Oliver Gavin	1:05.011	14
15	GT	#01 Extreme Speed Motorsports	Johannes van Overbeek	1:05.064	15
16	GT	#02 Extreme Speed Motorsports	Guy Cosmo	1:05.346	16
17	LMPC	#95 Level 5 Motorsports	Scott Tucker	1:05.617	17
18	GT	#92 BMW Rahal Letterman Racing	Bill Auberlen	1:06.907	18
19	GT	#40 Robertson Racing	David Murry	1:07.005	19
20	LMPC	#36 Genoa Racing	Tom Sedivy	1:07.584	20
21	GT	#75 Jaguar RSR	Ryan Dalziel	1:07.661	21
22	GT	#44 Flying Lizard Motorsports	Seth Neiman	1:07.892	22
23	**GTC**	**#54 Black Swan Racing**	**Jeroen Bleekemolen**	**1:08.129**	**23**
24	GTC	#63 TRG	Andy Lally	1:08.733	24
25	GT	#90 BMW Rahal Letterman Racing	Joey Hand	1:08.876	25
26	GTC	#88 Velox Motorsports	Shane Lewis	1:09.689	26
27	GTC	#32 GMG Racing	James Sofronas	1:09.837	27
28	GTC	#23 Alex Job Racing	Romeo Kapudija	1:11.135	28
29	GTC	#48 ORBIT	Bryce Miller	1:11.648	30
30	LMPC	#99 Green Earth Team Gunnar	Elton Julien	1:18.455	29

== Race ==
=== Race result ===
Class winners in bold. Cars failing to complete 70% of their class winner's distance are marked as Not Classified (NC).

Pos	Class	No	Team	Drivers	Chassis	Tire	Laps
Pos	Class	No	Team	Drivers	Engine	Tire	Laps
1	**LMP**	**6**	**(United States) Muscle Milk Team Cytosport**	**(United States) Greg Pickett (Germany) Klaus Graf**	**Porsche RS Spyder Evo**	M	**171**
1	**LMP**	**6**	**(United States) Muscle Milk Team Cytosport**	**(United States) Greg Pickett (Germany) Klaus Graf**	**Porsche MR6 3.4 L V8**	M	**171**
2	LMP	1	(United States) Patrón Highcroft Racing	(Australia) David Brabham (France) Simon Pagenaud	HPD ARX-01C	M	171
2	LMP	1	(United States) Patrón Highcroft Racing	(Australia) David Brabham (France) Simon Pagenaud	HPD AL7.R 3.4 L V8	M	171
3	**LMPC**	**99**	**(United States) Green Earth Team Gunnar**	**(United States) Gunnar Jeannette (United States) Elton Julian**	**Oreca FLM09**	M	**162**
3	**LMPC**	**99**	**(United States) Green Earth Team Gunnar**	**(United States) Gunnar Jeannette (United States) Elton Julian**	**Chevrolet LS3 6.2 L V8**	M	**162**
4	LMPC	52	(United States) PR1/Mathiasen Motorsports	(United States) Tom Papadopolous (United States) Alex Figge	Oreca FLM09	M	162
4	LMPC	52	(United States) PR1/Mathiasen Motorsports	(United States) Tom Papadopolous (United States) Alex Figge	Chevrolet LS3 6.2 L V8	M	162
5	**GT**	**45**	**(United States) Flying Lizard Motorsports**	**(Germany) Jörg Bergmeister (United States) Patrick Long**	**Porsche 997 GT3-RSR**	M	**161**
5	**GT**	**45**	**(United States) Flying Lizard Motorsports**	**(Germany) Jörg Bergmeister (United States) Patrick Long**	**Porsche 4.0 L Flat-6**	M	**161**
6	GT	92	(United States) BMW Rahal Letterman Racing	(United States) Bill Auberlen (United States) Tommy Milner	BMW M3 GT2	D	161
6	GT	92	(United States) BMW Rahal Letterman Racing	(United States) Bill Auberlen (United States) Tommy Milner	BMW 4.0 L V8	D	161
7	GT	90	(United States) BMW Rahal Letterman Racing	(Germany) Dirk Müller (United States) Joey Hand	BMW M3 GT2	D	161
7	GT	90	(United States) BMW Rahal Letterman Racing	(Germany) Dirk Müller (United States) Joey Hand	BMW 4.0 L V8	D	161
8	GT	61	(United States) Risi Competizione	(Finland) Mika Salo (Germany) Pierre Kaffer	Ferrari F430 GTE	M	160
8	GT	61	(United States) Risi Competizione	(Finland) Mika Salo (Germany) Pierre Kaffer	Ferrari 4.0 L V8	M	160
9	GT	4	(United States) Corvette Racing	(Monaco) Olivier Beretta (United Kingdom) Oliver Gavin	Chevrolet Corvette C6.R	M	159
9	GT	4	(United States) Corvette Racing	(Monaco) Olivier Beretta (United Kingdom) Oliver Gavin	Chevrolet 5.5 L V8	M	159
10	LMPC	95	(United States) Level 5 Motorsports	(United States) Scott Tucker (United Kingdom) Andy Wallace	Oreca FLM09	M	158
10	LMPC	95	(United States) Level 5 Motorsports	(United States) Scott Tucker (United Kingdom) Andy Wallace	Chevrolet LS3 6.2 L V8	M	158
11	GT	01	(United States) Extreme Speed Motorsports	(United States) Scott Sharp (United States) Johannes van Overbeek	Ferrari F430 GTE	M	157
11	GT	01	(United States) Extreme Speed Motorsports	(United States) Scott Sharp (United States) Johannes van Overbeek	Ferrari 4.0 L V8	M	157
12	GT	44	(United States) Flying Lizard Motorsports	(United States) Darren Law (United States) Seth Neiman	Porsche 997 GT3-RSR	M	157
12	GT	44	(United States) Flying Lizard Motorsports	(United States) Darren Law (United States) Seth Neiman	Porsche 4.0 L Flat-6	M	157
13	GT	17	(United States) Team Falken Tire	(United States) Bryan Sellers (Germany) Wolf Henzler	Porsche 997 GT3-RSR	F	156
13	GT	17	(United States) Team Falken Tire	(United States) Bryan Sellers (Germany) Wolf Henzler	Porsche 4.0 L Flat-6	F	156
14	**GTC**	**63**	**(United States) TRG**	**(France) Henri Richard (United States) Andy Lally**	**Porsche 997 GT3 Cup**	Y	**152**
14	**GTC**	**63**	**(United States) TRG**	**(France) Henri Richard (United States) Andy Lally**	**Porsche 3.8 L Flat-6**	Y	**152**
15	GT	75	(United States) Jaguar RSR	(Belgium) Marc Goossens (United Kingdom) Ryan Dalziel	Jaguar XKRS	Y	152
15	GT	75	(United States) Jaguar RSR	(Belgium) Marc Goossens (United Kingdom) Ryan Dalziel	Jaguar 5.0 L V8	Y	152
16	GTC	54	(United States) Black Swan Racing	(United States) Tim Pappas (Netherlands) Jeroen Bleekemolen	Porsche 997 GT3 Cup	Y	151
16	GTC	54	(United States) Black Swan Racing	(United States) Tim Pappas (Netherlands) Jeroen Bleekemolen	Porsche 3.8 L Flat-6	Y	151
17	GT	02	(United States) Extreme Speed Motorsports	(United States) Ed Brown (United States) Guy Cosmo	Ferrari F430 GTE	M	150
17	GT	02	(United States) Extreme Speed Motorsports	(United States) Ed Brown (United States) Guy Cosmo	Ferrari 4.0 L V8	M	150
18	GTC	88	(United States) Velox Motorsports	(United States) Shane Lewis (United States) Jerry Vento	Porsche 997 GT3 Cup	Y	149
18	GTC	88	(United States) Velox Motorsports	(United States) Shane Lewis (United States) Jerry Vento	Porsche 3.8 L Flat-6	Y	149
19	LMPC	36	(United States) Genoa Racing	(United States) Tom Sedivy (Germany) Christian Zugel	Oreca FLM09	M	146
19	LMPC	36	(United States) Genoa Racing	(United States) Tom Sedivy (Germany) Christian Zugel	Chevrolet LS3 6.2 L V8	M	146
20	GTC	32	(United States) GMG Racing	(United States) Bret Curtis (United States) James Sofronas	Porsche 997 GT3 Cup	Y	146
20	GTC	32	(United States) GMG Racing	(United States) Bret Curtis (United States) James Sofronas	Porsche 3.8 L Flat-6	Y	146
21	GTC	48	(United States) ORBIT	(United States) Bryce Miller (United Kingdom) Luke Hines	Porsche 997 GT3 Cup	Y	140
21	GTC	48	(United States) ORBIT	(United States) Bryce Miller (United Kingdom) Luke Hines	Porsche 3.8 L Flat-6	Y	140
22	LMP	37	(United States) Intersport Racing	(United States) Jon Field (United States) Clint Field	Lola B06/10	D	140
22	LMP	37	(United States) Intersport Racing	(United States) Jon Field (United States) Clint Field	AER P32C 4.0 L Turbo V8	D	140
23	GTC	23	(United States) Alex Job Racing	(United States) Bill Sweedler (United States) Romeo Kapudija	Porsche 997 GT3 Cup	Y	123
23	GTC	23	(United States) Alex Job Racing	(United States) Bill Sweedler (United States) Romeo Kapudija	Porsche 3.8 L Flat-6	Y	123
24 NC	LMP	8	(United Kingdom) Drayson Racing	(United Kingdom) Paul Drayson (United Kingdom) Jonny Cocker	Lola B09/60	M	113
24 NC	LMP	8	(United Kingdom) Drayson Racing	(United Kingdom) Paul Drayson (United Kingdom) Jonny Cocker	Judd GV5.5 S2 5.5 L V10	M	113
25 NC	GT	40	(United States) Robertson Racing	(United States) Andrea Robertson (United States) David Murry	Ford GT-R Mk. VII	D	110
25 NC	GT	40	(United States) Robertson Racing	(United States) Andrea Robertson (United States) David Murry	Ford 5.0 L V8	D	110
26 DNF	LMPC	89	(United States) Intersport Racing	(United States) Brian Wong (Canada) Kyle Marcelli	Oreca FLM09	M	108
26 DNF	LMPC	89	(United States) Intersport Racing	(United States) Brian Wong (Canada) Kyle Marcelli	Chevrolet LS3 6.2 L V8	M	108
27 DNF	GT	3	(United States) Corvette Racing	(Denmark) Jan Magnussen (United States) Johnny O'Connell	Chevrolet Corvette C6.R	M	35
27 DNF	GT	3	(United States) Corvette Racing	(Denmark) Jan Magnussen (United States) Johnny O'Connell	Chevrolet 5.5 L V8	M	35
28 DNF	GT	62	(United States) Risi Competizione	(Brazil) Jaime Melo (Italy) Gianmaria Bruni	Ferrari F430 GTE	M	21
28 DNF	GT	62	(United States) Risi Competizione	(Brazil) Jaime Melo (Italy) Gianmaria Bruni	Ferrari 4.0 L V8	M	21
29 DNF	LMP	16	(United States) Dyson Racing	(United States) Chris Dyson (United Kingdom) Guy Smith	Lola B09/86	D	7
29 DNF	LMP	16	(United States) Dyson Racing	(United States) Chris Dyson (United Kingdom) Guy Smith	Mazda MZR-R 2.0 L Turbo I4 (Butanol)	D	7
DNS	LMPC	55	(United States) Level 5 Motorsports	(United States) Scott Tucker (France) Christophe Bouchut	Oreca FLM09	M	-
DNS	LMPC	55	(United States) Level 5 Motorsports	(United States) Scott Tucker (France) Christophe Bouchut	Chevrolet LS3 6.2 L V8	M	-

American Le Mans Series
Previous race: Utah Grand Prix	2010 season	Next race: Mid-Ohio Sports Car Challenge
