= 2010 Utah Grand Prix =

Track map of Miller Motorsports Park outer circuit

The 2010 Larry H. Miller Dealerships Utah Grand Prix was held at Miller Motorsports Park during July 9–11, 2010. It was the fourth round of the 2010 American Le Mans Series season.

== Qualifying ==
The qualifying session saw Simon Pagenaud give Highcroft Racing the overall pole. Gunnar Jeannette took LMPC pole for Green Earth Team Gunnar, Gianmaria Bruni took the GT pole for Risi and reigning Porsche Supercup champion Jeroen Bleekemolen took GTC pole for Black Swan Racing.

=== Qualifying result ===
Pole position winners in each class are marked in bold.

Pos	Class	Team	Driver	Lap Time	Grid
1	**LMP**	**#1 Patrón Highcroft Racing**	**Simon Pagenaud**	**1:34.350**	**1**
2	LMP	#8 Drayson Racing	Jonny Cocker	1:34.886	2
3	LMP	#16 Dyson Racing Team	Chris Dyson	1:34.909	3
4	LMP	#6 Muscle Milk Team Cytosport	Klaus Graf	1:34.948	4
5	LMP	#37 Intersport Racing	Jon Field	1:35.379	5
6	LMP	#12 Autocon Motorsports	Tony Burgess	1:37.689	6
7	**LMPC**	**#99 Green Earth Team Gunnar**	**Gunnar Jeannette**	**1:42.592**	**7**
8	LMPC	#55 Level 5 Motorsports	Christophe Bouchut	1:42.802	8
9	LMPC	#52 PR1/Mathiasen Motorsports	Alex Figge	1:43.115	9
10	LMPC	#89 Intersport Racing	Kyle Marcelli	1:43.180	33
11	LMPC	#95 Level 5 Motorsports	Scott Tucker	1:44.901	10
12	**GT**	**#62 Risi Competizione**	**Gianmaria Bruni**	**1:47.667**	**11**
13	GT	#01 Extreme Speed Motorsports	Johannes van Overbeek	1:47.729	12
14	GT	#61 Risi Competizione	Toni Vilander	1:23.067	34
15	GT	#45 Flying Lizard Motorsports	Jörg Bergmeister	1:47.921	13
16	GT	#92 BMW Rahal Letterman Racing	Tommy Milner	1:47.966	14
17	GT	#90 BMW Rahal Letterman Racing	Dirk Müller	1:47.970	15
18	GT	#4 Corvette Racing	Olivier Beretta	1:48.022	16
19	GT	#3 Corvette Racing	Johnny O'Connell	1:48.279	17
20	GT	#02 Extreme Speed Motorsports	Guy Cosmo	1:48.550	18
21	GT	#40 Robertson Racing	David Murry	1:50.214	19
22	GT	#75 Jaguar RSR	Ryan Dalziel	1:52.178	20
23	GT	#44 Flying Lizard Motorsports	Seth Neiman	1:53.732	21
24	**GTC**	**#54 Black Swan Racing**	**Jeroen Bleekemolen**	**1:54.641**	**22**
25	GTC	#48 Orbit Racing	Bryce Miller	1:54.953	23
26	GTC	#80 Car Amigo - AJR	Luis Díaz	1:54.954	24
27	GTC	#88 Velox Motorsports	Shane Lewis	1:55.128	25
28	GTC	#63 TRG	Andy Lally	1:55.383	26
29	GTC	#32 GMG Racing	James Sofronas	1:55.418	27
30	GTC	#69 WERKS II Racing	Galen Bieker	1:55.432	28
31	GTC	#23 Alex Job Racing	Romeo Kapudija	1:55.616	29
32	GTC	#81 Alex Job Racing	Butch Leitzinger	1:55.838	30
33	GTC	#28 911 Design	Doug Baron	1:57.952	31
34	GTC	#80 Car Amigo - AJR	No Time		32

== Race ==
=== Race result ===
Class winners in bold. Cars failing to complete 70% of their class winner's distance are marked as Not Classified (NC).

Pos	Class	No	Team	Drivers	Chassis	Tire	Laps
Pos	Class	No	Team	Drivers	Engine	Tire	Laps
1	**LMP**	**1**	**(United States) Patrón Highcroft Racing**	**(Australia) David Brabham (France) Simon Pagenaud**	**HPD ARX-01C**	MI	**91**
1	**LMP**	**1**	**(United States) Patrón Highcroft Racing**	**(Australia) David Brabham (France) Simon Pagenaud**	**HPD 3.4 L V8**	MI	**91**
2	LMP	8	(United Kingdom) Drayson Racing	(United Kingdom) Paul Drayson (United Kingdom) Jonny Cocker (Italy) Emanuele Pirro	Lola B10/60	MI	91
2	LMP	8	(United Kingdom) Drayson Racing	(United Kingdom) Paul Drayson (United Kingdom) Jonny Cocker (Italy) Emanuele Pirro	Judd GV5.5 S2 5.5 L V10	MI	91
3	LMP	6	(United States) Muscle Milk Team Cytosport	(United States) Greg Pickett (Germany) Klaus Graf	Porsche RS Spyder Evo	MI	91
3	LMP	6	(United States) Muscle Milk Team Cytosport	(United States) Greg Pickett (Germany) Klaus Graf	Porsche MR6 3.4 L V8	MI	91
4	LMP	37	(United States) Intersport Racing	(United States) Jon Field (United States) Clint Field	Lola B06/10	D	88
4	LMP	37	(United States) Intersport Racing	(United States) Jon Field (United States) Clint Field	AER P32C 4.0 L Turbo V8	D	88
5	**LMPC**	**55**	**(United States) Level 5 Motorsports**	**(United States) Scott Tucker (France) Christophe Bouchut**	**Oreca FLM09**	MI	**86**
5	**LMPC**	**55**	**(United States) Level 5 Motorsports**	**(United States) Scott Tucker (France) Christophe Bouchut**	**Chevrolet LS3 6.2 L V8**	MI	**86**
6	LMPC	99	(United States) Green Earth Team Gunnar	(United States) Gunnar Jeannette (Germany) Christian Zugel	Oreca FLM09	MI	85
6	LMPC	99	(United States) Green Earth Team Gunnar	(United States) Gunnar Jeannette (Germany) Christian Zugel	Chevrolet LS3 6.2 L V8	MI	85
7	LMPC	52	(United States) PR1/Mathiasen Motorsports	(United States) Alex Figge (United States) Max Hyatt	Oreca FLM09	MI	85
7	LMPC	52	(United States) PR1/Mathiasen Motorsports	(United States) Alex Figge (United States) Max Hyatt	Chevrolet LS3 6.2 L V8	MI	85
8	LMPC	95	(United States) Level 5 Motorsports	(United States) Scott Tuker (United Kingdom) Andy Wallace	Oreca FLM09	MI	85
8	LMPC	95	(United States) Level 5 Motorsports	(United States) Scott Tuker (United Kingdom) Andy Wallace	Chevrolet LS3 6.2 L V8	MI	85
9	**GT**	**62**	**(United States) Risi Competizione**	**(Brazil) Jaime Melo (Italy) Gianmaria Bruni**	**Ferrari F430 GTE**	MI	**85**
9	**GT**	**62**	**(United States) Risi Competizione**	**(Brazil) Jaime Melo (Italy) Gianmaria Bruni**	**Ferrari 4.0 L V8**	MI	**85**
10	GT	92	(United States) BMW Rahal Letterman Racing	(United States) Bill Auberlen (United States) Tommy Milner	BMW M3 GT2	D	85
10	GT	92	(United States) BMW Rahal Letterman Racing	(United States) Bill Auberlen (United States) Tommy Milner	BMW 4.0 L V8	D	85
11	GT	3	(United States) Corvette Racing	(Denmark) Jan Magnussen (United States) Johnny O'Connell	Chevrolet Corvette C6.R	MI	84
11	GT	3	(United States) Corvette Racing	(Denmark) Jan Magnussen (United States) Johnny O'Connell	Chevrolet 5.5 L V8	MI	84
12	GT	90	(United States) BMW Rahal Letterman Racing	(Germany) Dirk Müller (United States) Joey Hand	BMW M3 GT2	D	84
12	GT	90	(United States) BMW Rahal Letterman Racing	(Germany) Dirk Müller (United States) Joey Hand	BMW 4.0 L V8	D	84
13	GT	45	(United States) Flying Lizard Motorsports	(Germany) Jörg Bergmeister (United States) Patrick Long	Porsche 997 GT3-RSR	MI	84
13	GT	45	(United States) Flying Lizard Motorsports	(Germany) Jörg Bergmeister (United States) Patrick Long	Porsche 4.0 L Flat-6	MI	84
14	GT	61	(United States) Risi Competizione	(Italy) Giancarlo Fisichella (Finland) Toni Vilander	Ferrari F430 GTE	MI	84
14	GT	61	(United States) Risi Competizione	(Italy) Giancarlo Fisichella (Finland) Toni Vilander	Ferrari 4.0 L V8	MI	84
15	GT	01	(United States) Extreme Speed Motorsports	(United States) Scott Sharp (United States) Johannes van Overbeek	Ferrari F430 GTE	MI	83
15	GT	01	(United States) Extreme Speed Motorsports	(United States) Scott Sharp (United States) Johannes van Overbeek	Ferrari 4.0 L V8	MI	83
16	GT	02	(United States) Extreme Speed Motorsports	(United States) Ed Brown (United States) Guy Cosmo	Ferrari F430 GTE	MI	83
16	GT	02	(United States) Extreme Speed Motorsports	(United States) Ed Brown (United States) Guy Cosmo	Ferrari 4.0 L V8	MI	83
17	GT	17	(United States) Team Falken Tire	(United States) Bryan Sellers (Germany) Wolf Henzler	Porsche 997 GT3-RSR	FAL	83
17	GT	17	(United States) Team Falken Tire	(United States) Bryan Sellers (Germany) Wolf Henzler	Porsche 4.0 L Flat-6	FAL	83
18	LMP	12	(United States) Autocon Motorsports	(United States) Bryan Willman (Canada) Tony Burgess	Lola B06/10	D	82
18	LMP	12	(United States) Autocon Motorsports	(United States) Bryan Willman (Canada) Tony Burgess	AER P32C 4.0 L Turbo V8	D	82
19	GT	4	(United States) Corvette Racing	(Monaco) Olivier Beretta (United Kingdom) Oliver Gavin	Chevrolet Corvette C6.R	MI	82
19	GT	4	(United States) Corvette Racing	(Monaco) Olivier Beretta (United Kingdom) Oliver Gavin	Chevrolet 5.5 L V8	MI	82
20	GT	44	(United States) Flying Lizard Motorsports	(United States) Darren Law (United States) Seth Neiman	Porsche 997 GT3-RSR	MI	81
20	GT	44	(United States) Flying Lizard Motorsports	(United States) Darren Law (United States) Seth Neiman	Porsche 4.0 L Flat-6	MI	81
21	**GTC**	**54**	**(United States) Black Swan Racing**	**(United States) Tim Pappas (Netherlands) Jeroen Bleekemolen**	**Porsche 997 GT3 Cup**	Y	**80**
21	**GTC**	**54**	**(United States) Black Swan Racing**	**(United States) Tim Pappas (Netherlands) Jeroen Bleekemolen**	**Porsche 3.8 L Flat-6**	Y	**80**
22	GTC	63	(United States) TRG	(France) Henri Richard (United States) Andy Lally	Porsche 997 GT3 Cup	Y	80
22	GTC	63	(United States) TRG	(France) Henri Richard (United States) Andy Lally	Porsche 3.8 L Flat-6	Y	80
23	GTC	69	(United States) WERKS II Racing	(United States) Robert Rodriguez (United States) Galen Bieker	Porsche 997 GT3 Cup	Y	79
23	GTC	69	(United States) WERKS II Racing	(United States) Robert Rodriguez (United States) Galen Bieker	Porsche 3.8 L Flat-6	Y	79
24	GTC	88	(United States) Velox Motorsports	(United States) Shane Lewis (United States) Jerry Vento	Porsche 997 GT3 Cup	Y	79
24	GTC	88	(United States) Velox Motorsports	(United States) Shane Lewis (United States) Jerry Vento	Porsche 3.8 L Flat-6	Y	79
25	GTC	48	(United States) Orbit Racing	(United States) Bryce Miller (United Kingdom) Luke Hines	Porsche 997 GT3 Cup	Y	78
25	GTC	48	(United States) Orbit Racing	(United States) Bryce Miller (United Kingdom) Luke Hines	Porsche 3.8 L Flat-6	Y	78
26	GTC	28	(United States) 911 Design	(United States) Loren Beggs (United States) Doug Baron	Porsche 997 GT3 Cup	Y	78
26	GTC	28	(United States) 911 Design	(United States) Loren Beggs (United States) Doug Baron	Porsche 3.8 L Flat-6	Y	78
27	GT	40	(United States) Robertson Racing	(United States) David Robertson (United States) Andrea Robertson (United States) David Murry	Ford GT-R Mk. VII	D	78
27	GT	40	(United States) Robertson Racing	(United States) David Robertson (United States) Andrea Robertson (United States) David Murry	Ford 5.0 L V8	D	78
28	GTC	32	(United States) GMG Racing	(United States) Bret Curtis (United States) James Sofronas	Porsche 997 GT3 Cup	Y	78
28	GTC	32	(United States) GMG Racing	(United States) Bret Curtis (United States) James Sofronas	Porsche 3.8 L Flat-6	Y	78
29	GTC	23	(United States) Alex Job Racing	(United States) Bill Sweedler (United States) Romeo Kapudija	Porsche 997 GT3 Cup	Y	77
29	GTC	23	(United States) Alex Job Racing	(United States) Bill Sweedler (United States) Romeo Kapudija	Porsche 3.28 L Flat-6	Y	77
30 DNF	LMP	16	(United States) Dyson Racing Team	(United States) Chris Dyson (United Kingdom) Guy Smith	Lola B09/86	D	73
30 DNF	LMP	16	(United States) Dyson Racing Team	(United States) Chris Dyson (United Kingdom) Guy Smith	Mazda MZR-R 2.0 L Turbo I4 (Butanol)	D	73
31 NC	GT	75	(United States) Jaguar RSR	(United Kingdom) Ryan Dalziel (Belgium) Marc Goossens	Jaguar XKRS	Y	57
31 NC	GT	75	(United States) Jaguar RSR	(United Kingdom) Ryan Dalziel (Belgium) Marc Goossens	Jaguar 5.0 L V8	Y	57
32 DNF	LMPC	89	(United States) Intersport Racing	(Canada) Kyle Marcelli (United States) Brian Wong	Oreca FLM09	MI	21
32 DNF	LMPC	89	(United States) Intersport Racing	(Canada) Kyle Marcelli (United States) Brian Wong	Chevrolet LS3 6.2 L V8	MI	21
33 DNF	GTC	80	(United States) Car Amigo - AJR	(Mexico) Ricardo González (Mexico) Luis Díaz	Porsche 997 GT3 Cup	Y	5
33 DNF	GTC	80	(United States) Car Amigo - AJR	(Mexico) Ricardo González (Mexico) Luis Díaz	Porsche 3.8 L Flat-6	Y	5
DSQ	GTC	81	(United States) Alex Job Racing	(Mexico) Juan González (United States) Butch Leitzinger	Porsche 997 GT3 Cup	Y	80
DSQ	GTC	81	(United States) Alex Job Racing	(Mexico) Juan González (United States) Butch Leitzinger	Porsche 3.8 L Flat-6	Y	80

American Le Mans Series
Previous race: ALMS Monterey	2010 season	Next race: Northeast Grand Prix
