= 2010 American Le Mans Series at Long Beach =

Long Beach Street Circuit

The 2010 Tequila Patrón American Le Mans Series at Long Beach was the second round of the 2010 American Le Mans Series season. It took place at the Long Beach Street Circuit on April 17, 2010.

== Qualifying ==
The qualifying session saw Adrian Fernández take the overall pole for Aston Martin Racing. Christophe Bouchut gave Level 5 Motorsports the LMPC pole, Jaime Melo gave Risi Competizione the GT pole and Andy Lally gave TRG the GTC pole after the Black Swan Racing entry was demoted to the back of the grid after it was found they used improper fuel in qualifying.

=== Qualifying result ===
Pole position winners in each class are marked in bold.

Pos	Class	Team	Driver	Lap Time	Grid
1	**LMP**	**#007 Aston Martin Racing**	**Adrian Fernández**	**1:13.213**	**1**
2	LMP	#1 Patrón Highcroft Racing	Simon Pagenaud	1:13.285	2
3	LMP	#16 Dyson Racing Team	Chris Dyson	1:14.191	3
4	LMP	#6 Muscle Milk Team Cytosport	Klaus Graf	1:14.259	4
5	LMP	#37 Intersport Racing	Jon Field	1:15.136	5
6	LMP	#8 Drayson Racing	Jonny Cocker	1:17.084	6
7	**LMPC**	**#55 Level 5 Motorsports**	**Christophe Bouchut**	**1:17.273**	**7**
8	LMPC	#99 Green Earth Team Gunnar	Gunnar Jeannette	1:17.520	8
9	LMP	#12 Autocon Motorsports	Tomy Drissi	1:17.611	9
10	LMPC	#36 Genoa Racing	J. R. Hildebrand	1:18.186	10
11	LMPC	#11 Performance Tech	Kyle Marcelli	1:18.422	11
12	**GT**	**#62 Risi Competizione**	**Jaime Melo**	**1:19.581**	**12**
13	GT	#17 Team Falken Tire	Wolf Henzler	1:20.179	13
14	GT	#3 Corvette Racing	Johnny O'Connell	1:20.308	14
15	GT	#45 Flying Lizard Motorsports	Patrick Long	1:20.424	15
16	GT	#4 Corvette Racing	Olivier Beretta	1:20.438	16
17	GT	#92 BMW Rahal Letterman Racing	Bill Auberlen	1:20.486	17
18	GT	#90 BMW Rahal Letterman Racing	Joey Hand	1:20.564	18
19	GT	#02 Extreme Speed Motorsports	Guy Cosmo	1:20.587	19
20	LMPC	#95 Level 5 Motorsports	Scott Tucker	1:21.151	20
21	GT	#01 Extreme Speed Motorsports	Scott Sharp	1:21.346	21
22	GT	#44 Flying Lizard Motorsports	Darren Law	1:21.457	22
23	GT	#40 Robertson Racing	David Murry	1:21.960	23
24	LMPC	#89 Intersport Racing	Brian Wong	1:22.014	24
25	GT	#75 Jaguar RSR	Ryan Dalziel	1:22.985	25
26	LMPC	#52 PR1 Mathiasen Motorsports	Johnny Mowlem	1:23.599	26
27	GTC	#54 Black Swan Racing	Jeroen Bleekemolen	1:23.857	36
28	**GTC**	**#63 TRG**	**Andy Lally**	**1:24.098**	**27**
29	GTC	#32 GMG Racing	James Sofronas	1:24.256	28
30	GTC	#81 Alex Job Racing	Butch Leitzinger	1:24.288	29
31	GTC	#23 Alex Job Racing	Romeo Kapudija	1:24.462	30
32	GTC	#88 Velox Motorsports	Shane Lewis	1:24.672	31
33	GTC	#48 Orbit Racing	Bryce Miller	1:24.730	32
34	GTC	#69 WERKS II Racing	Galen Bieker	1:24.968	33
35	GTC	#28 911 Design	Loren Beggs	1:25.952	34
36	GTC	#80 Car Amigo/Alex Job Racing	Luis Díaz	1:26.771	35

== Race ==
The race was won by the #1 Highcroft Acura but only by a margin of 0.353 seconds over the #007 Aston Martin. The #99 Green Earth Team Gunnar car was the first LMPC car to cross the line finishing fifth overall, one lap ahead of the next nearest LMPC car. The #45 Flying Lizard Porsche won in the GT class and the #81 Alex Job Racing car took the GTC win.

=== Race result ===
Class winners in bold. Cars failing to complete 70% of their class winner's distance are marked as Not Classified (NC).

Pos	Class	No	Team	Drivers	Chassis	Tire	Laps
Pos	Class	No	Team	Drivers	Engine	Tire	Laps
1	**LMP**	**1**	**(United States) Patrón Highcroft Racing**	**(Australia) David Brabham (France) Simon Pagenaud**	**HPD ARX-01C**	M	**67**
1	**LMP**	**1**	**(United States) Patrón Highcroft Racing**	**(Australia) David Brabham (France) Simon Pagenaud**	**HPD 3.4 L V8**	M	**67**
2	LMP	007	(United Kingdom) Aston Martin Racing	(Switzerland) Harold Primat (Mexico) Adrian Fernández	Lola-Aston Martin B09/60	M	67
2	LMP	007	(United Kingdom) Aston Martin Racing	(Switzerland) Harold Primat (Mexico) Adrian Fernández	Aston Martin 6.0 L V12	M	67
3	LMP	6	(United States) Muscle Milk Team Cytosport	(United States) Greg Pickett (Germany) Klaus Graf	Porsche RS Spyder Evo	M	67
3	LMP	6	(United States) Muscle Milk Team Cytosport	(United States) Greg Pickett (Germany) Klaus Graf	Porsche MR6 3.4 L V8	M	67
4	LMP	16	(United States) Dyson Racing Team	(United States) Chris Dyson (United Kingdom) Guy Smith	Lola B09/86	M	67
4	LMP	16	(United States) Dyson Racing Team	(United States) Chris Dyson (United Kingdom) Guy Smith	Mazda MZR-R 2.0 L Turbo I4 (Butanol)	M	67
5	**LMPC**	**99**	**(United States) Green Earth Team Gunnar**	**(United States) Elton Julian (United States) Gunnar Jeannette**	**Oreca FLM09**	M	**66**
5	**LMPC**	**99**	**(United States) Green Earth Team Gunnar**	**(United States) Elton Julian (United States) Gunnar Jeannette**	**Chevrolet LS3 6.2 L V8**	M	**66**
6	LMPC	55	(United States) Level 5 Motorsports	(United States) Scott Tucker (France) Christophe Bouchut	Oreca FLM09	M	65
6	LMPC	55	(United States) Level 5 Motorsports	(United States) Scott Tucker (France) Christophe Bouchut	Chevrolet LS3 6.2 L V8	M	65
7	LMPC	36	(United States) Genoa Racing	(United States) J. R. Hildebrand (United States) Tom Sutherland	Oreca FLM09	M	65
7	LMPC	36	(United States) Genoa Racing	(United States) J. R. Hildebrand (United States) Tom Sutherland	Chevrolet LS3 6.2 L V8	M	65
8	**GT**	**45**	**(United States) Flying Lizard Motorsports**	**(Germany) Jörg Bergmeister (United States) Patrick Long**	**Porsche 997 GT3-RSR**	M	**65**
8	**GT**	**45**	**(United States) Flying Lizard Motorsports**	**(Germany) Jörg Bergmeister (United States) Patrick Long**	**Porsche 4.0 L Flat-6**	M	**65**
9	LMP	12	(United States) Autocon Motorsports	(United States) Tomy Drissi (United States) Ken Davis	Lola B06/10	D	65
9	LMP	12	(United States) Autocon Motorsports	(United States) Tomy Drissi (United States) Ken Davis	AER P32C 4.0 L Turbo V8	D	65
10	GT	3	(United States) Corvette Racing	(Denmark) Jan Magnussen (United States) Johnny O'Connell	Chevrolet Corvette C6.R	M	65
10	GT	3	(United States) Corvette Racing	(Denmark) Jan Magnussen (United States) Johnny O'Connell	Chevrolet 5.5 L V8	M	65
11	GT	92	(United States) BMW Rahal Letterman Racing	(United States) Bill Auberlen (United States) Tommy Milner	BMW M3 GT2	D	65
11	GT	92	(United States) BMW Rahal Letterman Racing	(United States) Bill Auberlen (United States) Tommy Milner	BMW 4.0 L V8	D	65
12	GT	62	(United States) Risi Competizione	(Brazil) Jaime Melo (Italy) Gianmaria Bruni	Ferrari F430 GTC	M	65
12	GT	62	(United States) Risi Competizione	(Brazil) Jaime Melo (Italy) Gianmaria Bruni	Ferrari 4.0 L V8	M	65
13	GT	90	(United States) BMW Rahal Letterman Racing	(Germany) Dirk Müller (United States) Joey Hand	BMW M3 GT2	D	65
13	GT	90	(United States) BMW Rahal Letterman Racing	(Germany) Dirk Müller (United States) Joey Hand	BMW 4.0 L V8	D	65
14	GT	17	(United States) Team Falken Tire	(United States) Bryan Sellers (Germany) Wolf Henzler	Porsche 997 GT3-RSR	F	65
14	GT	17	(United States) Team Falken Tire	(United States) Bryan Sellers (Germany) Wolf Henzler	Porsche 4.0 L Flat-6	F	65
15	GT	01	(United States) Extreme Speed Motorsports	(United States) Scott Sharp (United States) Johannes van Overbeek	Ferrari F430 GTC	M	65
15	GT	01	(United States) Extreme Speed Motorsports	(United States) Scott Sharp (United States) Johannes van Overbeek	Ferrari 4.0 L V8	M	65
16	GT	02	(United States) Extreme Speed Motorsports	(United States) Ed Brown (United States) Guy Cosmo	Ferrari F430 GTC	M	64
16	GT	02	(United States) Extreme Speed Motorsports	(United States) Ed Brown (United States) Guy Cosmo	Ferrari 4.0 L V8	M	64
17	LMPC	89	(United States) Intersport Racing	(United States) Mitch Pagerey (United States) Brian Wong	Oreca FLM09	M	63
17	LMPC	89	(United States) Intersport Racing	(United States) Mitch Pagerey (United States) Brian Wong	Chevrolet LS3 6.2 L V8	M	63
18	GT	4	(United States) Corvette Racing	(Monaco) Olivier Beretta (United Kingdom) Oliver Gavin	Chevrolet Corvette C6.R	M	63
18	GT	4	(United States) Corvette Racing	(Monaco) Olivier Beretta (United Kingdom) Oliver Gavin	Chevrolet 5.5 L V8	M	63
19	**GTC**	**81**	**(United States) Alex Job Racing**	**(Mexico) Juan González (United States) Butch Leitzinger**	**Porsche 997 GT3 Cup**	Y	**63**
19	**GTC**	**81**	**(United States) Alex Job Racing**	**(Mexico) Juan González (United States) Butch Leitzinger**	**Porsche 3.8 L Flat-6**	Y	**63**
20	GTC	32	(United States) GMG Racing	(United States) Bret Curtis (United States) James Sofronas	Porsche 997 GT3 Cup	Y	63
20	GTC	32	(United States) GMG Racing	(United States) Bret Curtis (United States) James Sofronas	Porsche 3.8 L Flat-6	Y	63
21	GTC	23	(United States) Alex Job Racing	(United States) Bill Sweedler (United States) Romeo Kapudija	Porsche 997 GT3 Cup	Y	63
21	GTC	23	(United States) Alex Job Racing	(United States) Bill Sweedler (United States) Romeo Kapudija	Porsche 3.8 L Flat-6	Y	63
22	LMPC	11	(United States) Performance Tech	(United States) Gerardo Bonilla (Canada) Kyle Marcelli	Oreca FLM09	M	62
22	LMPC	11	(United States) Performance Tech	(United States) Gerardo Bonilla (Canada) Kyle Marcelli	Chevrolet LS3 6.2 L V8	M	62
23	GT	40	(United States) Robertson Racing	(United States) David Robertson (United States) David Murry	Ford GT-R Mk. VII	D	62
23	GT	40	(United States) Robertson Racing	(United States) David Robertson (United States) David Murry	Ford 5.0 L V8	D	62
24	GTC	88	(United States) Velox Racing	(United States) Shane Lewis (United States) Jerry Vento	Porsche 997 GT3 Cup	Y	62
24	GTC	88	(United States) Velox Racing	(United States) Shane Lewis (United States) Jerry Vento	Porsche 3.8 L Flat-6	Y	62
25	LMP	8	(United Kingdom) Drayson Racing	(United Kingdom) Paul Drayson (United Kingdom) Jonny Cocker	Lola B09/60	M	62
25	LMP	8	(United Kingdom) Drayson Racing	(United Kingdom) Paul Drayson (United Kingdom) Jonny Cocker	Judd GV5.5 S2 5.5 L V10	M	62
26	GTC	48	(United States) Orbit Racing	(United States) Bryce Miller (United States) John McMullen	Porsche 997 GT3 Cup	Y	61
26	GTC	48	(United States) Orbit Racing	(United States) Bryce Miller (United States) John McMullen	Porsche 3.8 L Flat-6	Y	61
27	GTC	69	(United States) WERKS II Racing	(United States) Robert Rodriguez (United States) Galen Bieker	Porsche 997 GT3 Cup	Y	61
27	GTC	69	(United States) WERKS II Racing	(United States) Robert Rodriguez (United States) Galen Bieker	Porsche 3.8 L Flat-6	Y	61
28	GTC	80	(United States) Car Amigo-Alex Job Racing	(Mexico) Juan González (Mexico) Luis Díaz	Porsche 997 GT3 Cup	Y	61
28	GTC	80	(United States) Car Amigo-Alex Job Racing	(Mexico) Juan González (Mexico) Luis Díaz	Porsche 3.8 L Flat-6	Y	61
29	GTC	54	(United States) Black Swan Racing	(United States) Tim Pappas (Netherlands) Jeroen Bleekemolen	Porsche 997 GT3 Cup	Y	60
29	GTC	54	(United States) Black Swan Racing	(United States) Tim Pappas (Netherlands) Jeroen Bleekemolen	Porsche 3.8 L Flat-6	Y	60
30 DNF	LMP	37	(United States) Intersport Racing	(United States) Jon Field (United States) Clint Field	Lola B06/10	D	48
30 DNF	LMP	37	(United States) Intersport Racing	(United States) Jon Field (United States) Clint Field	AER P32C 4.0 L Turbo V8	D	48
31	GTC	63	(United States) TRG	(France) Henri Richard (United States) Andy Lally	Porsche 997 GT3 Cup	Y	48
31	GTC	63	(United States) TRG	(France) Henri Richard (United States) Andy Lally	Porsche 3.8 L Flat-6	Y	48
32 NC	GT	75	(United States) Jaguar RSR	(United States) Paul Gentilozzi (United Kingdom) Ryan Dalziel	Jaguar XKRS	Y	45
32 NC	GT	75	(United States) Jaguar RSR	(United States) Paul Gentilozzi (United Kingdom) Ryan Dalziel	Jaguar 5.0 L V8	Y	45
33 DNF	GT	44	(United States) Flying Lizard Motorsports	(United States) Darren Law (United States) Seth Neiman	Porsche 997 GT3-RSR	M	28
33 DNF	GT	44	(United States) Flying Lizard Motorsports	(United States) Darren Law (United States) Seth Neiman	Porsche 4.0 L Flat-6	M	28
34 DNF	GTC	28	(United States) 911 Design	(United States) Loren Beggs (United States) Doug Baron	Porsche 997 GT3 Cup	Y	6
34 DNF	GTC	28	(United States) 911 Design	(United States) Loren Beggs (United States) Doug Baron	Porsche 3.8 L Flat-6	Y	6
35 DNF	LMPC	52	(United States) PR1 Mathiasen Motorsports	(United Kingdom) Johnny Mowlem (United States) Tom Papadopolous	Oreca FLM09	M	3
35 DNF	LMPC	52	(United States) PR1 Mathiasen Motorsports	(United Kingdom) Johnny Mowlem (United States) Tom Papadopolous	Chevrolet LS3 6.2 L V8	M	3
DNS	LMPC	95	(United States) Level 5 Motorsports	(United States) Scott Tucker (United States) Ryan Hunter-Reay	Oreca FLM09	M	-
DNS	LMPC	95	(United States) Level 5 Motorsports	(United States) Scott Tucker (United States) Ryan Hunter-Reay	Chevrolet LS3 6.2 L V8	M	-

American Le Mans Series
Previous race: 12 Hours of Sebring	2010 season	Next race: Monterey Sports Car Championships
