= 2010 American Le Mans Series =

40th season of the racing series organized by IMSA

Seasons
- ← 2009 2011 →

The 2010 American Le Mans Series season was the 40th overall season for the IMSA GT Championship, and the twelfth as the American Le Mans Series presented by Tequila Patrón. It was also the first season in which the ALMS used a revised structure for its four classes, as well as the first year in a three-year sponsorship deal with Patrón. The season began with the 12 Hours of Sebring on March 20 and ended with the Petit Le Mans on October 2, completing nine total races.

The senior class, LMP, the new combination class of the old LMP1 and LMP2 classes, saw defending LMP1 champions Patrón Highcroft Racing with defending champion driver David Brabham and new teammate Simon Pagenaud took a 23-point victory in their Honda over Porsche driver Klaus Graf. The other carry over category GT (the former GT2 class) Flying Lizard Motorsports Porsche duo of Patrick Long and Jörg Bergmeister successfully defended their class championship over Risi Competizione Ferrari driver Gianmaria Bruni. There was no GT1 category left in the series.

In the two spec-racer classes Scott Tucker of Level 5 Motorsports was the dominant driver in the LMP Challenge class, winning five of the nine races in the class' first full season. After debuting for half of the 2009 season, the new GT Challenge class saw the Black Swan Racing Porsche of Jeroen Bleekemolen and Tim Pappas claim the class victory.

== Schedule ==
The 2010 American Le Mans Series season features nine events, dropping the St. Petersburg round from 2009. Laguna Seca will no longer end the season but is instead moved to May and has been extended from four hours to six hours; this will allow the Petit Le Mans to conclude the season. The Utah Grand Prix at Miller Motorsports Park has also had its date pushed back to July due to the move by Laguna Seca. The Petit Le Mans will also form part of the inaugural Intercontinental Le Mans Cup for LMP1s.

Rnd	Race	Length	Circuit	Location	Date
–	American Le Mans Series Winter Test		Sebring International Raceway	Sebring, Florida	February 22–23
1	58th Mobil 1 12 Hours of Sebring	12 Hours	Sebring International Raceway	Sebring, Florida	March 20
2	Tequila Patrón American Le Mans Series at Long Beach	1 Hour 40 Minutes	Long Beach Street Circuit	Long Beach, California	April 17
3	American Le Mans Series Monterey	6 Hours	Mazda Raceway Laguna Seca	Monterey, California	May 22
4	Larry H. Miller Dealerships Utah Grand Prix	2 Hours 45 Minutes	Miller Motorsports Park	Tooele, Utah	July 10
5	American Le Mans Northeast Grand Prix	2 Hours 45 Minutes	Lime Rock Park	Lakeville, Connecticut	July 24
6	Mid-Ohio Sports Car Challenge	2 Hours 45 Minutes	Mid-Ohio Sports Car Course	Lexington, Ohio	August 7
7	American Le Mans Series powered by eStar	2 Hours 45 Minutes	Road America	Elkhart Lake, Wisconsin	August 22
8	Grand Prix of Mosport	2 Hours 45 Minutes	Mosport International Raceway	Bowmanville, Ontario	August 29
9	13th Annual Petit Le Mans	1,000 mi (1,600 km) or 10 Hours	Road Atlanta	Braselton, Georgia	October 2

== Regulation changes ==
Introduced on August 16, 2009, IMSA announced a new class structure for the 2010 season in order to address costs. Several previous classes will be retained, while some new classes will be added. Le Mans Prototypes, which previously ran in the LMP1 and LMP2 categories, will be combined into a single LMP category for much of the season. IMSA will modify the LMP1 and LMP2 rules through performance balancing in order to allow the two to compete equally in the new single category. However, the 12 Hours of Sebring and Petit Le Mans endurance races will not use this unified class, instead reverting to the 2009 regulations as used by the Automobile Club de l'Ouest (ACO) at the 24 Hours of Le Mans. The championship points payout for these two events have yet to be determined by IMSA.

A new Le Mans Prototype category will be established as a feeder system for young or amateur drivers. This category, known as Le Mans Prototype Challenge (LMPC), will borrow from the Formula Le Mans Cup series in Europe by utilizing a spec racing format. All teams will use Oreca FLM09 chassis, Chevrolet production V8s, and other standardized equipment. Along with the European Le Mans Series' (2010 season) Formula Le Mans, the ALMS LMPC makes up as its own class in the races throughout the season rather than racing as a support series.

With a lack of competitors in the former GT1 category, GT2 has been renamed to just GT and will be the premiere category for grand tourers in ALMS in 2010. The ALMS Challenge category, first established in 2009, will be expanded in 2010 and renamed as GT Challenge (GTC). The category will race for the full season for the first time. Porsche 911 GT3s from racing series other than the IMSA GT3 Cup Challenge will also be accepted for the first time.

== Entry list ==
=== Le Mans Prototype 1 (LMP1) ===
Team	Chassis	Engine	Tyre	No.	Drivers	Rnds.
(United Kingdom) Aston Martin Racing	Lola-Aston Martin B09/60	Aston Martin 6.0 L V12	M	007	(Mexico) Adrian Fernandez	1–2
(United Kingdom) Aston Martin Racing	Lola-Aston Martin B09/60	Aston Martin 6.0 L V12	M	007	(Switzerland) Harold Primat	1–2
(United Kingdom) Aston Martin Racing	Lola-Aston Martin B09/60	Aston Martin 6.0 L V12	M	007	(Germany) Stefan Mücke	1
(France) Team Peugeot Total	Peugeot 908 HDi FAP	Peugeot HDi 5.5 L Turbo V12 (Diesel)	M	07	(Austria) Alexander Wurz	1, 9
(France) Team Peugeot Total	Peugeot 908 HDi FAP	Peugeot HDi 5.5 L Turbo V12 (Diesel)	M	07	(United Kingdom) Anthony Davidson	1, 9
(France) Team Peugeot Total	Peugeot 908 HDi FAP	Peugeot HDi 5.5 L Turbo V12 (Diesel)	M	07	(Spain) Marc Gené	1, 9
(France) Team Peugeot Total	Peugeot 908 HDi FAP	Peugeot HDi 5.5 L Turbo V12 (Diesel)	M	08	(Portugal) Pedro Lamy	1
(France) Team Peugeot Total	Peugeot 908 HDi FAP	Peugeot HDi 5.5 L Turbo V12 (Diesel)	M	08	(France) Sébastien Bourdais	1
(France) Team Peugeot Total	Peugeot 908 HDi FAP	Peugeot HDi 5.5 L Turbo V12 (Diesel)	M	08	(France) Nicolas Minassian	1
(France) Team Peugeot Total	Peugeot 908 HDi FAP	Peugeot HDi 5.5 L Turbo V12 (Diesel)	M	08	(France) Stéphane Sarrazin	9
(France) Team Peugeot Total	Peugeot 908 HDi FAP	Peugeot HDi 5.5 L Turbo V12 (Diesel)	M	08	(France) Franck Montagny	9
(Germany) Audi Sport Team Joest	Audi R15 TDI plus	Audi TDI 5.5L Turbo V10 (Diesel)	M	7	(United Kingdom) Allan McNish	9
(Germany) Audi Sport Team Joest	Audi R15 TDI plus	Audi TDI 5.5L Turbo V10 (Diesel)	M	7	(Denmark) Tom Kristensen	9
(Germany) Audi Sport Team Joest	Audi R15 TDI plus	Audi TDI 5.5L Turbo V10 (Diesel)	M	7	(Italy) Rinaldo Capello	9
(Germany) Audi Sport Team Joest	Audi R15 TDI plus	Audi TDI 5.5L Turbo V10 (Diesel)	M	9	(Germany) André Lotterer	9
(Germany) Audi Sport Team Joest	Audi R15 TDI plus	Audi TDI 5.5L Turbo V10 (Diesel)	M	9	(Switzerland) Marcel Fässler	9
(Germany) Audi Sport Team Joest	Audi R15 TDI plus	Audi TDI 5.5L Turbo V10 (Diesel)	M	9	(France) Benoît Tréluyer	9
(United Kingdom) Drayson Racing	Lola B09/60	Judd GV5.5 S2 5.5 L V10	M	8	(United Kingdom) Jonny Cocker	All
(United Kingdom) Drayson Racing	Lola B09/60	Judd GV5.5 S2 5.5 L V10	M	8	(United Kingdom) Paul Drayson	All
(United Kingdom) Drayson Racing	Lola B09/60	Judd GV5.5 S2 5.5 L V10	M	8	(Italy) Emanuele Pirro	1, 3–4, 9
(United States) Autocon Motorsports	Lola B06/10	AER P32T 4.0L Turbo V8	D	12	(United States) Bryan Willman	1, 3–4, 6–7, 9
(United States) Autocon Motorsports	Lola B06/10	AER P32T 4.0L Turbo V8	D	12	(Canada) Tony Burgess	1, 3–4, 7–9
(United States) Autocon Motorsports	Lola B06/10	AER P32T 4.0L Turbo V8	D	12	(Germany) Pierre Ehret	1, 3
(United States) Autocon Motorsports	Lola B06/10	AER P32T 4.0L Turbo V8	D	12	(United States) Tomy Drissi	2, 6
(United States) Autocon Motorsports	Lola B06/10	AER P32T 4.0L Turbo V8	D	12	(United States) Ken Davis	2
(United States) Autocon Motorsports	Lola B06/10	AER P32T 4.0L Turbo V8	D	12	(United Kingdom) Johnny Mowlem	7–8
(United States) Autocon Motorsports	Lola B06/10	AER P32T 4.0L Turbo V8	D	12	(United States) Chris McMurry	9
(United States) Intersport Racing	Lola B06/10	AER P32T 4.0L Turbo V8	D	37	(United States) Jon Field	All
(United States) Intersport Racing	Lola B06/10	AER P32T 4.0L Turbo V8	D	37	(United States) Clint Field	All
(United States) Intersport Racing	Lola B06/10	AER P32T 4.0L Turbo V8	D	37	(United States) Nikolas Konstant	3
(United States) Intersport Racing	Lola B06/10	AER P32T 4.0L Turbo V8	D	37	(United Kingdom) Ben Devlin	9

=== Le Mans Prototype 2 (LMP2) ===
Team	Chassis	Engine	Tyre	No.	Drivers	Rnds.
(United States) Patrón Highcroft Racing	HPD ARX-01C	HPD AL7R 3.4 L V8	M	1	(France) Simon Pagenaud	All
(United States) Patrón Highcroft Racing	HPD ARX-01C	HPD AL7R 3.4 L V8	M	1	(Australia) David Brabham	All
(United States) Patrón Highcroft Racing	HPD ARX-01C	HPD AL7R 3.4 L V8	M	1	(United Kingdom) Marino Franchitti	1, 3, 9
(United Kingdom) Libra Racing	Radical SR9	Nissan 4.0 L V8	D	5	(United States) Andrew Prendeville	6–7, 9
(United Kingdom) Libra Racing	Radical SR9	Nissan 4.0 L V8	D	5	(United Kingdom) Chris Buncombe	6
(United Kingdom) Libra Racing	Radical SR9	Nissan 4.0 L V8	D	5	(Argentina) José Balbiani	7
(United Kingdom) Libra Racing	Radical SR9	Nissan 4.0 L V8	D	5	(Republic of Ireland) Peter Dempsey	9
(United Kingdom) Libra Racing	Radical SR9	Nissan 4.0 L V8	D	5	(Finland) Harri Toivonen	9
(United States) Muscle Milk Team Cytosport	Porsche RS Spyder Evo	Porsche MR6 3.4L V8	M	6	(Germany) Klaus Graf	All
(United States) Muscle Milk Team Cytosport	Porsche RS Spyder Evo	Porsche MR6 3.4L V8	M	6	(United States) Greg Pickett	1–2, 4–6
(United States) Muscle Milk Team Cytosport	Porsche RS Spyder Evo	Porsche MR6 3.4L V8	M	6	(Germany) Sascha Maassen	1, 3, 9
(United States) Muscle Milk Team Cytosport	Porsche RS Spyder Evo	Porsche MR6 3.4L V8	M	6	(United States) Memo Gidley	3
(United States) Muscle Milk Team Cytosport	Porsche RS Spyder Evo	Porsche MR6 3.4L V8	M	6	(Germany) Timo Bernhard	7
(United States) Muscle Milk Team Cytosport	Porsche RS Spyder Evo	Porsche MR6 3.4L V8	M	6	(France) Romain Dumas	8
(United States) Muscle Milk Team Cytosport	Porsche RS Spyder Evo	Porsche MR6 3.4L V8	M	6	(Germany) Lucas Luhr	9
(United States) Dyson Racing Team	Lola B09/86	Mazda MZR-R 2.0 L Turbo I4 (Butanol)	D	16	(United States) Chris Dyson	All
(United States) Dyson Racing Team	Lola B09/86	Mazda MZR-R 2.0 L Turbo I4 (Butanol)	D	16	(United Kingdom) Guy Smith	All
(United States) Dyson Racing Team	Lola B09/86	Mazda MZR-R 2.0 L Turbo I4 (Butanol)	D	16	(United Kingdom) Andy Meyrick	1, 3, 9
(France) OAK Racing	Pescarolo 01	Judd DB 3.4 L V8	D	35	(France) Jacques Nicolet	9
(France) OAK Racing	Pescarolo 01	Judd DB 3.4 L V8	D	35	(France) Frédéric da Rocha	9
(France) OAK Racing	Pescarolo 01	Judd DB 3.4 L V8	D	35	(France) Patrice Lafargue	9

=== Le Mans Prototype Challenge (LMPC) ===
Note: All entires utilized the Oreca FLM09 chassis, the Chevrolet LS3 6.2 L V8 engine, and Michelin tyres.

Team	No.	Drivers	Rnds.
(United States) Primetime Race Group (United States) Performance Tech	11	(Canada) Kyle Marcelli	1–2
(United States) Primetime Race Group (United States) Performance Tech	11	(United States) Joel Feinberg	1
(United States) Primetime Race Group (United States) Performance Tech	11	(United States) Tom Weickardt	1
(United States) Primetime Race Group (United States) Performance Tech	11	(United States) Gerardo Bonilla	2
(United States) Genoa Racing	36	(United States) Tom Sutherland	1–3
(United States) Genoa Racing	36	(United States) J. R. Hildebrand	1–2
(United States) Genoa Racing	36	(United Kingdom) Andy Wallace	1
(United States) Genoa Racing	36	(Canada) Kyle Marcelli	3
(United States) Genoa Racing	36	(United States) Tom Weickardt	3
(United States) Genoa Racing	36	(United States) Christian Zugel	5–8
(United States) Genoa Racing	36	(United States) Tom Sedivy	5
(United States) Genoa Racing	36	(United States) Frankie Montecalvo	6–9
(United States) Genoa Racing	36	(United States) Alex Figge	9
(United States) Genoa Racing	36	(United States) Eric Lux	9
(United States) PR1/Mathiasen Motorsports	52	(United States) Tom Papadopolous	2–3, 5
(United States) PR1/Mathiasen Motorsports	52	(United Kingdom) Johnny Mowlem	2–3
(United States) PR1/Mathiasen Motorsports	52	(United Kingdom) Ryan Lewis	3, 9
(United States) PR1/Mathiasen Motorsports	52	(United States) Alex Figge	4–5
(United States) PR1/Mathiasen Motorsports	52	(United States) Max Hyatt	4
(United States) PR1/Mathiasen Motorsports	52	(Mexico) Ricardo González	6–9
(United States) PR1/Mathiasen Motorsports	52	(Mexico) Luis Díaz	6–9
(United States) Level 5 Motorsports	55	(United States) Scott Tucker	All
(United States) Level 5 Motorsports	55	(France) Christophe Bouchut	All
(United States) Level 5 Motorsports	55	(Canada) Mark Wilkins	1, 3, 9
(United States) Level 5 Motorsports	95	(United States) Scott Tucker	All
(United States) Level 5 Motorsports	95	(United States) Ryan Hunter-Reay	1–2
(United States) Level 5 Motorsports	95	(United States) James Gue	1
(United States) Level 5 Motorsports	95	(United Kingdom) Andy Wallace	3–8
(United States) Level 5 Motorsports	95	(United States) Burt Frisselle	3, 9
(United States) Level 5 Motorsports	95	(Germany) Marco Werner	9
(United States) Intersport Racing	73	(United States) Antonio Downs	9
(United States) Intersport Racing	73	(United States) Lucas Downs	9
(United States) Intersport Racing	73	(United States) Matt Downs	9
(United States) Intersport Racing	89	(United States) Brian Wong	1–6
(United States) Intersport Racing	89	(United States) Mitch Pagerey	1–3
(United States) Intersport Racing	89	(United States) David Ducote	1, 3, 9
(United States) Intersport Racing	89	(Canada) Kyle Marcelli	4–9
(United States) Intersport Racing	89	(United States) Chapman Ducote	7–9
(United States) Green Earth Team Gunnar	99	(United States) Gunnar Jeannette	All
(United States) Green Earth Team Gunnar	99	(United States) Elton Julian	1–3, 5–9
(United States) Green Earth Team Gunnar	99	(United States) Christian Zugel	1, 3–4, 9

=== Grand Touring (GT) ===
Team	Chassis	Engine	Tyre	No.	Drivers	Rnds.
(United States) Extreme Speed Motorsports	Ferrari F430 GTE	Ferrari 4.0 L V8	M	01	(United States) Scott Sharp	All
(United States) Extreme Speed Motorsports	Ferrari F430 GTE	Ferrari 4.0 L V8	M	01	(United States) Johannes Van Overbeek	All
(United States) Extreme Speed Motorsports	Ferrari F430 GTE	Ferrari 4.0 L V8	M	01	(Germany) Dominik Farnbacher	1, 9
(United States) Extreme Speed Motorsports	Ferrari F430 GTE	Ferrari 4.0 L V8	M	02	(United States) Guy Cosmo	All
(United States) Extreme Speed Motorsports	Ferrari F430 GTE	Ferrari 4.0 L V8	M	02	(United States) Ed Brown	All
(United States) Extreme Speed Motorsports	Ferrari F430 GTE	Ferrari 4.0 L V8	M	02	(Portugal) João Barbosa	1, 9
(United States) Robertson Racing	Ford GT-R Mk. VII	Ford Cammer 5.0 L V8	D	04	(United States) David Murry	9
(United States) Robertson Racing	Ford GT-R Mk. VII	Ford Cammer 5.0 L V8	D	04	(United Kingdom) Rob Bell	9
(United States) Robertson Racing	Ford GT-R Mk. VII	Ford Cammer 5.0 L V8	D	04	(United States) Anthony Lazzaro	9
(United States) Robertson Racing	Ford GT-R Mk. VII	Ford Cammer 5.0 L V8	D	40	(United States) David Murry	1–8
(United States) Robertson Racing	Ford GT-R Mk. VII	Ford Cammer 5.0 L V8	D	40	(United States) David Robertson	1–4, 6–9
(United States) Robertson Racing	Ford GT-R Mk. VII	Ford Cammer 5.0 L V8	D	40	(United States) Andrea Robertson	1, 3–9
(United States) Robertson Racing	Ford GT-R Mk. VII	Ford Cammer 5.0 L V8	D	40	(United States) Craig Stanton	9
(United States) Corvette Racing	Chevrolet Corvette C6.R	Chevrolet 5.5 L V8	M	3	(United States) Johnny O'Connell	All
(United States) Corvette Racing	Chevrolet Corvette C6.R	Chevrolet 5.5 L V8	M	3	(Denmark) Jan Magnussen	1–7
(United States) Corvette Racing	Chevrolet Corvette C6.R	Chevrolet 5.5 L V8	M	3	(Spain) Antonio García	1, 9
(United States) Corvette Racing	Chevrolet Corvette C6.R	Chevrolet 5.5 L V8	M	3	(Monaco) Olivier Beretta	8–9
(United States) Corvette Racing	Chevrolet Corvette C6.R	Chevrolet 5.5 L V8	M	4	(United Kingdom) Oliver Gavin	All
(United States) Corvette Racing	Chevrolet Corvette C6.R	Chevrolet 5.5 L V8	M	4	(Monaco) Olivier Beretta	1–7
(United States) Corvette Racing	Chevrolet Corvette C6.R	Chevrolet 5.5 L V8	M	4	(France) Emmanuel Collard	1, 9
(United States) Corvette Racing	Chevrolet Corvette C6.R	Chevrolet 5.5 L V8	M	4	(Denmark) Jan Magnussen	8–9
(United States) ACS Express Racing	Ford GT-R Mk. VII	Ford Cammer 5.0 L V8	M	10	(United States) Brandon Davis	9
(United States) ACS Express Racing	Ford GT-R Mk. VII	Ford Cammer 5.0 L V8	M	10	(United States) Boris Said	9
(United States) ACS Express Racing	Ford GT-R Mk. VII	Ford Cammer 5.0 L V8	M	10	(United States) Townsend Bell	9
(United States) Team Falken Tire	Porsche 997 GT3-RSR	Porsche 4.0 L Flat-6	F	17	(Germany) Wolf Henzler	All
(United States) Team Falken Tire	Porsche 997 GT3-RSR	Porsche 4.0 L Flat-6	F	17	(United States) Bryan Sellers	All
(United States) Team Falken Tire	Porsche 997 GT3-RSR	Porsche 4.0 L Flat-6	F	17	(France) Patrick Pilet	1
(United States) Team Falken Tire	Porsche 997 GT3-RSR	Porsche 4.0 L Flat-6	F	17	(Austria) Martin Ragginger	9
(United States) Jaguar RSR	Jaguar XKRS	Jaguar 5.0 L V8	Y	33	(United States) Butch Leitzinger	9
(United States) Jaguar RSR	Jaguar XKRS	Jaguar 5.0 L V8	Y	33	(United States) Tomy Drissi	9
(United States) Jaguar RSR	Jaguar XKRS	Jaguar 5.0 L V8	Y	33	(United Kingdom) Andy Wallace	9
(United States) Jaguar RSR	Jaguar XKRS	Jaguar 5.0 L V8	Y	75	(United Kingdom) Ryan Dalziel	1–5, 7, 9
(United States) Jaguar RSR	Jaguar XKRS	Jaguar 5.0 L V8	Y	75	(United States) Paul Gentilozzi	1–4, 6, 8–9
(United States) Jaguar RSR	Jaguar XKRS	Jaguar 5.0 L V8	Y	75	(Belgium) Marc Goossens	1, 3–9
(United States) Flying Lizard Motorsports	Porsche 997 GT3-RSR	Porsche 4.0 L Flat-6	M	44	(United States) Seth Neiman	All
(United States) Flying Lizard Motorsports	Porsche 997 GT3-RSR	Porsche 4.0 L Flat-6	M	44	(United States) Darren Law	1–5, 7–9
(United States) Flying Lizard Motorsports	Porsche 997 GT3-RSR	Porsche 4.0 L Flat-6	M	44	(Austria) Richard Lietz	1
(United States) Flying Lizard Motorsports	Porsche 997 GT3-RSR	Porsche 4.0 L Flat-6	M	44	(Germany) Timo Bernhard	3
(United States) Flying Lizard Motorsports	Porsche 997 GT3-RSR	Porsche 4.0 L Flat-6	M	44	(France) Patrick Pilet	6
(United States) Flying Lizard Motorsports	Porsche 997 GT3-RSR	Porsche 4.0 L Flat-6	M	44	(Germany) Marco Holzer	9
(United States) Flying Lizard Motorsports	Porsche 997 GT3-RSR	Porsche 4.0 L Flat-6	M	45	(Germany) Jörg Bergmeister	All
(United States) Flying Lizard Motorsports	Porsche 997 GT3-RSR	Porsche 4.0 L Flat-6	M	45	(United States) Patrick Long	All
(United States) Flying Lizard Motorsports	Porsche 997 GT3-RSR	Porsche 4.0 L Flat-6	M	45	(Germany) Marc Lieb	1, 9
(United States) Panoz Team	Panoz Abruzzi	Chevrolet 6.5 L V8	M	50	(United Kingdom) Ian James	9*
(United States) Panoz Team	Panoz Abruzzi	Chevrolet 6.5 L V8	M	50	(Switzerland) Benjamin Leuenberger	9*
(United States) Risi Competizione	Ferrari F430 GTE	Ferrari F136 GT 4.0L V8	M	61	(Sweden) Niclas Jönsson	1, 3
(United States) Risi Competizione	Ferrari F430 GTE	Ferrari F136 GT 4.0L V8	M	61	(United States) Tracy Krohn	1, 3
(United States) Risi Competizione	Ferrari F430 GTE	Ferrari F136 GT 4.0L V8	M	61	(Belgium) Eric van de Poele	1
(United States) Risi Competizione	Ferrari F430 GTE	Ferrari F136 GT 4.0L V8	M	61	(Finland) Toni Vilander	4, 6, 8
(United States) Risi Competizione	Ferrari F430 GTE	Ferrari F136 GT 4.0L V8	M	61	(Italy) Giancarlo Fisichella	4, 6, 9
(United States) Risi Competizione	Ferrari F430 GTE	Ferrari F136 GT 4.0L V8	M	61	(Germany) Pierre Kaffer	5, 7–8
(United States) Risi Competizione	Ferrari F430 GTE	Ferrari F136 GT 4.0L V8	M	61	(Finland) Mika Salo	5, 7, 9
(United States) Risi Competizione	Ferrari F430 GTE	Ferrari F136 GT 4.0L V8	M	61	(Brazil) Jaime Melo	9
(United States) Risi Competizione	Ferrari F430 GTE	Ferrari F136 GT 4.0L V8	M	62	(Italy) Gianmaria Bruni	All
(United States) Risi Competizione	Ferrari F430 GTE	Ferrari F136 GT 4.0L V8	M	62	(Brazil) Jaime Melo	1–8
(United States) Risi Competizione	Ferrari F430 GTE	Ferrari F136 GT 4.0L V8	M	62	(Germany) Pierre Kaffer	1
(United States) Risi Competizione	Ferrari F430 GTE	Ferrari F136 GT 4.0L V8	M	62	(Finland) Toni Vilander	8–9
(United States) BMW Rahal Letterman Racing	BMW M3 GT2	BMW 4.0 L V8	D	90	(United States) Joey Hand	All
(United States) BMW Rahal Letterman Racing	BMW M3 GT2	BMW 4.0 L V8	D	90	(Germany) Dirk Müller	All
(United States) BMW Rahal Letterman Racing	BMW M3 GT2	BMW 4.0 L V8	D	90	(United Kingdom) Andy Priaulx	1, 9
(United States) BMW Rahal Letterman Racing	BMW M3 GT2	BMW 4.0 L V8	D	92	(United States) Bill Auberlen	All
(United States) BMW Rahal Letterman Racing	BMW M3 GT2	BMW 4.0 L V8	D	92	(United States) Tommy Milner	All
(United States) BMW Rahal Letterman Racing	BMW M3 GT2	BMW 4.0 L V8	D	92	(Germany) Dirk Werner	1, 9

=== Grand Touring Challenge (GTC) ===
Note: All entires utilized the Porsche 997 GT3 Cup chassis, the Porsche 3.8 L Flat-6 engine, and Yokohama tyres.

Team	No.	Drivers	Rnd(s)
(United States) Alex Job Racing	23	(United States) Bill Sweedler	All
(United States) Alex Job Racing	23	(United States) Romeo Kapudija	1–7, 9
(United States) Alex Job Racing	23	(Germany) Jan-Dirk Lueders	1, 3, 9
(United States) Alex Job Racing	23	(United States) Mitch Pagerey	8
(United States) Alex Job Racing	80	(Mexico) Ricardo González	1–4
(United States) Alex Job Racing	80	(Mexico) Luis Díaz	1–4
(United States) Alex Job Racing	80	(United States) Patrick Kelly	1
(United States) Alex Job Racing	81	(United States) Butch Leitzinger	1–4
(United States) Alex Job Racing	81	(Mexico) Juan González	1–4
(United States) Alex Job Racing	81	(United States) Leh Keen	1
(United States) Alex Job Racing	81	(Mexico) Rudy Junco, Jr.	3
(United States) 911 Design	28	(United States) Loren Beggs	2–4, 6–7, 9
(United States) 911 Design	28	(United States) Doug Baron	2–4, 6–7, 9
(United States) 911 Design	28	(Canada) René Villeneuve	9
(United States) GMG Racing	32	(United States) James Sofronas	1–7
(United States) GMG Racing	32	(United States) Bret Curtis	1–7
(United States) GMG Racing	32	(United States) Andy Pilgrim	1
(United States) GMG Racing	32	(United States) Terry Borcheller	3
(United States) Orbit Racing (United States) Paul Miller Racing	48	(United States) Bryce Miller	2–9
(United States) Orbit Racing (United States) Paul Miller Racing	48	(United States) John McMullen	2–3
(United States) Orbit Racing (United States) Paul Miller Racing	48	(United Kingdom) Luke Hines	3–9
(United States) Orbit Racing (United States) Paul Miller Racing	48	(Germany) Pierre Ehret	9
(United States) Black Swan Racing	48	(United States) Tim Pappas	All
(United States) Black Swan Racing	48	(Netherlands) Jeroen Bleekemolen	All
(United States) Black Swan Racing	48	(United States) Anthony Lazzaro	1*
(United States) Black Swan Racing	48	(Netherlands) Sebastiaan Bleekemolen	3, 9
(United States) The Racer's Group	63	(United States) Andy Lally	All
(United States) The Racer's Group	63	(France) Henri Richard	1–7, 8–9
(United States) The Racer's Group	63	(United States) Duncan Ende	1, 7, 9
(United States) The Racer's Group	63	(Canada) René Villeneuve	3
(United States) Magnus Racing	77	(United States) Andrew Davis	9
(United States) Magnus Racing	77	(United States) John Potter	9
(United States) Magnus Racing	77	(United States) Ryan Eversley	9
(United States) Velox Motorsports	88	(United States) Shane Lewis	All
(United States) Velox Motorsports	88	(United States) Jerry Vento	1–6, 9
(United States) Velox Motorsports	88	(United States) Lawson Aschenbach	1, 3, 8–9
(United States) Velox Motorsports	88	(United States) Vic Rice	7
(United States) Porsche Motorsports North America	911	(France) Romain Dumas	9
(United States) Porsche Motorsports North America	911	(Germany) Timo Bernhard	9
(United States) Porsche Motorsports North America	911	(Germany) Mike Rockenfeller	9

* Was on the entry list but did not participate in the event.

== Season results ==
Note that the Sebring and Petit Le Mans events will be held under ACO regulations requiring the LMP class to be split amongst LMP1 and LMP2. The overall race winner, regardless of their LMP category, is listed here.

Class winners in the Petit Le Mans (LMP1, LMP2 and GT) receive an automatic entry to the 2011 24 Hours of Le Mans.

Overall winners in bold.

Rnd	Circuit	LMP Winning Team	LMPC Winning Team	GT Winning Team	GTC Winning Team	Results
Rnd	Circuit	LMP Winning Drivers	LMPC Winning Drivers	GT Winning Drivers	GTC Winning Drivers	Results
1	Sebring	(France) **#07 Team Peugeot Total**	(United States) #55 Level 5 Motorsports	(United States) #62 Risi Competizione	(United States) #81 Alex Job Racing	Results
1	Sebring	(Spain) **Marc Gené** (Austria) **Alexander Wurz** (United Kingdom) **Anthony Davidson**	(United States) Scott Tucker (France) Christophe Bouchut (Canada) Mark Wilkins	(Brazil) Jaime Melo (Italy) Gianmaria Bruni (Germany) Pierre Kaffer	(United States) Butch Leitzinger (United States) Leh Keen (Mexico) Juan González	Results
2	Long Beach	(United States) **#1 Patrón Highcroft Racing**	(United States) #99 Green Earth Team Gunnar	(United States) #45 Flying Lizard Motorsports	(United States) #81 Alex Job Racing	Results
2	Long Beach	(Australia) **David Brabham** (France) **Simon Pagenaud**	(United States) Gunnar Jeannette (United States) Elton Julian	(United States) Patrick Long (Germany) Jörg Bergmeister	(United States) Butch Leitzinger (Mexico) Juan González	Results
3	Laguna Seca	(United States) **#1 Patrón Highcroft Racing**	(United States) #55 Level 5 Motorsports	(United States) #45 Flying Lizard Motorsports	(United States) #54 Black Swan Racing	Results
3	Laguna Seca	(Australia) **David Brabham** (France) **Simon Pagenaud** (United Kingdom) **Marino Franchitti**	(United States) Scott Tucker (France) Christophe Bouchut (Canada) Mark Wilkins	(United States) Patrick Long (Germany) Jörg Bergmeister	(United States) Tim Pappas (Netherlands) Jeroen Bleekemolen (Netherlands) Sebastiaan Bleekemolen	Results
4	Miller	(United States) **#1 Patrón Highcroft Racing**	(United States) #55 Level 5 Motorsports	(United States) #62 Risi Competizione	(United States) #54 Black Swan Racing	Results
4	Miller	(Australia) **David Brabham** (France) **Simon Pagenaud**	(United States) Scott Tucker (France) Christophe Bouchut	(Brazil) Jaime Melo (Italy) Gianmaria Bruni	(United States) Tim Pappas (Netherlands) Jeroen Bleekemolen	Results
5	Lime Rock	(United States) **#6 Muscle Milk Team Cytosport**	(United States) #99 Green Earth Team Gunnar	(United States) #45 Flying Lizard Motorsports	(United States) #63 TRG	Results
5	Lime Rock	(United States) **Greg Pickett** (Germany) **Klaus Graf**	(United States) Gunnar Jeannette (United States) Elton Julian	(Germany) Jörg Bergmeister (United States) Patrick Long	(France) Henri Richard (United States) Andy Lally	Results
6	Mid-Ohio	(United States) **#16 Dyson Racing**	(United States) #55 Level 5 Motorsports	(United States) #62 Risi Competizione	(United States) #54 Black Swan Racing	Results
6	Mid-Ohio	(United States) **Chris Dyson** (United Kingdom) **Guy Smith**	(United States) Scott Tucker (France) Christophe Bouchut	(Brazil) Jaime Melo (Italy) Gianmaria Bruni	(United States) Tim Pappas (Netherlands) Jeroen Bleekemolen	Results
7	Road America	(United Kingdom) **#8 Drayson Racing**	(United States) #99 Green Earth Team Gunnar	(United States) #90 BMW Rahal Letterman Racing	(United States) #54 Black Swan Racing	Results
7	Road America	(United Kingdom) **Paul Drayson** (United Kingdom) **Jonny Cocker**	(United States) Gunnar Jeannette (United States) Elton Julian	(Germany) Dirk Müller (United States) Joey Hand	(United States) Tim Pappas (Netherlands) Jeroen Bleekemolen	Results
8	Mosport	(United States) **#6 Muscle Milk Team Cytosport**	(United States) #99 Green Earth Team Gunnar	(United States) #45 Flying Lizard Motorsports	(United States) #88 Velox Motorsports	Results
8	Mosport	(France) **Romain Dumas** (Germany) **Klaus Graf**	(United States) Gunnar Jeannette (United States) Elton Julian	(United States) Patrick Long (Germany) Jörg Bergmeister	(United States) Shane Lewis (United States) Lawson Aschenbach	Results
9	Road Atlanta	(France) **#08 Team Peugeot Total**	(United States) #95 Level 5 Motorsports	(United States) #4 Corvette Racing	(United States) #63 TRG	Results
9	Road Atlanta	(France) **Franck Montagny** (France) **Stéphane Sarrazin** (Portugal) **Pedro Lamy**	(United States) Scott Tucker (United States) Burt Frisselle (Germany) Marco Werner	(United Kingdom) Oliver Gavin (Denmark) Jan Magnussen (France) Emmanuel Collard	(France) Henri Richard (United States) Duncan Ende (United States) Andy Lally	Results

== Championships ==
Points were awarded to the top ten cars and drivers which complete at least 70% of their class winner's distance. Teams with multiple entries only score the points of their highest finishing entry in each race. Drivers were required to drive a minimum of 45 minutes to earn points, except for the Long Beach event which required only 30 minutes.

Starting with the Utah race, drivers are required to complete a particular amount of the minimum number of laps in order to earn points. The number of laps vary depending on the course size.

Points System
Race Distance	Position									
Race Distance	1st	2nd	3rd	4th	5th	6th	7th	8th	9th	10th
Less than three hours	20	16	13	10	8	6	4	3	2	1
Between four and eight hours	25	21	18	15	13	11	9	8	7	6
More than eight hours	30	26	23	20	18	16	14	13	12	11

=== Team championships ===
Teams with full season entries are awarded points in the team championships. Teams which participated in a partial season or on a race-by-race basis are not included in these championships.

As long as they compete full season and comply with ACO regulations, the top LMP1, LMP2 and GT team at the end of the season receive an automatic entry to the 2011 24 Hours of Le Mans.

==== LMP standings ====
Although combined into a single LMP class for seven events, the LMP1 and LMP2 category rules are utilized for the Sebring and Petit Le Mans races. The individual results and points for LMP1 and LMP2 are combined into the overall LMP standings.

Pos	Team	Class	Chassis	Engine	SEB	LBH	LGA	MIL	LRP	MOH	ROA	MOS	ATL	Total
1	(United States) Patrón Highcroft Racing	LMP2	HPD ARX-01C	HPD AL7R 3.4 L V8	26	20	25	20	16	16	13	16	30	182
2	(United States) Muscle Milk Team Cytosport	LMP2	Porsche RS Spyder Evo	Porsche MR6 3.4 L V8	30	16	21	13	20		16	20	26	162
3	(United Kingdom) Drayson Racing	LMP1	Lola B09/60	Judd GV5.5 S2 5.5 L V10	30	8		16	0	0	20	10	26	110
4	(United States) Dyson Racing Team	LMP2	Lola B09/86	Mazda MZR-R 2.0 L Turbo I4	23	13	18	6	0	20	10	8	0	98
5	(United States) Intersport Racing	LMP1	Lola B06/10	AER P32T 4.0 L Turbo V8		6		10	13	10	0	0	30	69
6	(United States) Autocon Motorsports	LMP1	Lola B06/10	AER P32T 4.0 L Turbo V8		10	15	8	0	13	8	13	0	67

==== LMPC standings ====
All teams utilize the Oreca FLM09 chassis with Chevrolet LS3 engine.

Pos	Team	SEB	LBH	LGA	MIL	LRP	MOH	ROA	MOS	ATL	Total
1	(United States) Level 5 Motorsports	30	16	25	20	13	20	13	16	30	183
2	(United States) Green Earth Team Gunnar	26	20	18	16	20	13	20	20	16	169
3	(United States) Genoa Racing	23	13	21		10	6	0	13	18	104
4	(United States) Intersport Racing	18	10	15	0	0	10	10	6	26	95
5	(United States) PR1/Mathiasen Motorsports		0	0	13	16	16	16	8	23	92
6	(United States) Performance Tech	20	8								28

==== GT standings ====
Pos	Team	Chassis	Engine	SEB	LBH	LGA	MIL	LRP	MOH	ROA	MOS	ATL	Total
1	(United States) BMW Rahal Letterman Racing	BMW M3 GT2	BMW 4.0 L V8	26	13	21	16	16	13	20	13	20	158
2	(United States) Flying Lizard Motorsports	Porsche 997 GT3-RSR	Porsche 4.0 L Flat-6	20	20	25	8	20	10	16	20	18	157
3	(United States) Risi Competizione	Ferrari F430 GTE	Ferrari 4.0 L V8	30	10	15	20	10	20	6	16	23	150
4	(United States) Corvette Racing	Chevrolet Corvette C6.R	Chevrolet 5.5 L V8	13	16	18	13	8	16	13	10	30	137
5	(United States) Extreme Speed Motorsports	Ferrari F430 GTE	Ferrari 4.0 L V8	16	4	13	4	6	8	8	6	26	91
6	(United States) Team Falken Tire	Porsche 997 GT3-RSR	Porsche 4.0 L Flat-6	0	6	9	2	3	3	1	4	12	40
7	(United States) Robertson Racing	Ford GT-R Mk. VII	Ford 5.0 L V8	11	1	6	0	0	0		0	0	18
8	(United States) Jaguar RSR	Jaguar XKRS	Jaguar 4.2 L V8	0	0	0	0	2	2		1	0	5

==== GTC standings ====
All teams utilize variations of the Porsche 997 GT3 Cup.

Pos	Team	SEB	LBH	LGA	MIL	LRP	MOH	ROA	MOS	ATL	Total
1	(United States) Black Swan Racing		3	25	20	16	20	20	16	26	146
2	(United States) Alex Job Racing	30	20	18	3	6	13	10	13	16	129
3	(United States) Velox Motorsports	18	10	11	10	13	8	13	20	23	126
4	(United States) TRG	16	2	21	16	20	6	8	0	30	119
5	(United States) WERKS II Racing	20	6	8	13			16		18	81
6	(United States) GMG Racing	14	16	0	4	10	16	0			60
7	(United States) Orbit Racing		8	13	8	8	10	0	10		57
8	(United States) 911 Design		0	7	6		4	6		20	43

=== Driver championships ===
Drivers who participated in races but failed to score points over the course of the season are not listed.

==== LMP standings ====
Although combined into a single LMP class for seven events, the LMP1 and LMP2 category rules are utilized for the Sebring and Petit Le Mans races. The individual results and points for LMP1 and LMP2 are combined into the overall LMP standings.

Pos	Driver	Team	SEB	LBH	LGA	MIL	LRP	MOH	ROA	MOS	ATL	Total
1=	(Australia) David Brabham	(United States) Patrón Highcroft Racing	26	20	25	20	16	16	13	16	30	182
1=	(France) Simon Pagenaud	(United States) Patrón Highcroft Racing	26	20	25	20	16	16	13	16	30	182
2	(Germany) Klaus Graf	(United States) Muscle Milk Team Cytosport	30	16	21	13	20		16	20	26	162
3	(United Kingdom) Jonny Cocker	(United Kingdom) Drayson Racing	30	8	0	16	0	0	20	10	26	110
4	(United States) Chris Dyson	(United States) Dyson Racing Team	23	13	18	6	0	20	10	8	0	98
5	(United Kingdom) Paul Drayson	(United Kingdom) Drayson Racing	30	8	0		0	0	20	10	26	94
6	(United Kingdom) Guy Smith	(United States) Dyson Racing Team	23	13	18	0	0	20	10	8	0	92
7	(United Kingdom) Marino Franchitti	(United States) Patrón Highcroft Racing	26		25						30	81
8	(United States) Greg Pickett	(United States) Muscle Milk Team Cytosport	30	16		13	20					79
9	(Germany) Sascha Maassen	(United States) Muscle Milk Team Cytosport	30		21						26	77
10	(United States) Clint Field	(United States) Intersport Racing		6	0	10	13	10	0	0	30	69
11	(United States) Jon Field	(United States) Intersport Racing		6	0	10	13	0	0	0	30	59
12	(Italy) Emanuele Pirro	(United Kingdom) Drayson Racing	30		0	16						46
13	(United States) Bryan Willman	(United States) Autocon Motorsports			15	8		13	8		0	44
14	(United Kingdom) Andy Meyrick	(United States) Dyson Racing Team	23		18						0	41
15	(United Kingdom) Ben Devlin	(United States) Intersport Racing									30	30
16	(Canada) Tony Burgess	(United States) Autocon Motorsports			0	8			8	13	0	29
17	(Germany) Lucas Luhr	(United States) Muscle Milk Team Cytosport									26	26
18	(United States) Tomy Drissi	(United States) Autocon Motorsports		10				13				23
19	(United Kingdom) Johnny Mowlem	(United States) Autocon Motorsports							8	13		21
20	(France) Romain Dumas	(United States) Muscle Milk Team Cytosport								20		20
21	(Germany) Timo Bernhard	(United States) Muscle Milk Team Cytosport							16			16
22	(Germany) Pierre Ehret	(United States) Autocon Motorsports			15							15
23	(United States) Ken Davis	(United States) Autocon Motorsports		10								10

==== LMPC standings ====
Drivers in the LMPC category are allowed to drive for more than one car during an event. If a driver is in each car for a minimum of two hours each, he is allowed to score the points from whichever car he chooses.

Pos	Driver	Team	SEB	LBH	LGA	MIL	LRP	MOH	ROA	MOS	ATL	Total
1	(United States) Scott Tucker	(United States) Level 5 Motorsports	30	16	25	20	13	20	13	16	30	183
2	(United States) Gunnar Jeannette	(United States) Green Earth Team Gunnar	26	20	18	16	20	13	20	20	16	169
3	(United States) Elton Julian	(United States) Green Earth Team Gunnar	26	20	18		20	13	20	20	16	153
4	(France) Christophe Bouchut	(United States) Level 5 Motorsports	30	16	25	20	0	20	0	16	20	147
5	(Canada) Kyle Marcelli	(United States) Performance Tech	20	8								101
5	(Canada) Kyle Marcelli	(United States) Genoa Racing			21							101
5	(Canada) Kyle Marcelli	(United States) Intersport Racing				0	0	10	10	6	26	101
6	(Germany) Christian Zugel	(United States) Green Earth Team Gunnar	26		18	16					0	89
6	(Germany) Christian Zugel	(United States) Genoa Racing					10	6	0	13		89
7	(United Kingdom) Andy Wallace	(United States) Genoa Racing	23									77
7	(United Kingdom) Andy Wallace	(United States) Level 5 Motorsports			0	10	13	8	13	10		77
8	(Canada) Mark Wilkins	(United States) Level 5 Motorsports	30		25						20	75
9=	(Mexico) Ricardo González	(United States) PR1/Mathiasen Motorsports						16	16	8	23	63
9=	(Mexico) Luis Díaz	(United States) PR1/Mathiasen Motorsports						16	16	8	23	63
10	(United States) David Ducote	(United States) Intersport Racing	18		15						26	59
11	(United States) Tom Sutherland	(United States) Genoa Racing	23	13	21							57
12	(United States) Brian Wong	(United States) Intersport Racing	18	10	15	0	0	10				53
13	(United States) Alex Figge	(United States) PR1/Mathiasen Motorsports				13	16					47
13	(United States) Alex Figge	(United States) Genoa Racing									18	47
14	(United States) Mitch Pagerey	(United States) Intersport Racing	18	10	15							43
15	(United States) Chapman Ducote	(United States) Intersport Racing							10	6	26	42
16	(United States) Frankie Montecalvo	(United States) Genoa Racing						6		13	18	37
17	(United States) J. R. Hildebrand	(United States) Genoa Racing	23	13								36
18=	(Germany) Marco Werner	(United States) Level 5 Motorsports									30	30
18=	(United States) Burt Frisselle	(United States) Level 5 Motorsports									30	30
19	(United Kingdom) Ryan Lewis	(United States) PR1/Mathiasen Motorsports									23	23
20=	(United States) Joel Feinberg	(United States) Primetime-Braille Battery Race Group	20									20
20=	(United States) Tom Weickardt	(United States) Primetime-Braille Battery Race Group	20									20
21	(United States) Eric Lux	(United States) Genoa Racing									18	37
22	(United States) Tom Papadopoulos	(United States) PR1/Mathiasen Motorsports		0	0		16					16
23	(United States) Max Hyatt	(United States) PR1/Mathiasen Motorsports				13						13
24	(United States) Tom Sedivy	(United States) Genoa Racing					10					10
25	(United States) Gerardo Bonilla	(United States) Performance Tech		8								8

==== GT standings ====
Pos	Driver	Team	SEB	LBH	LGA	MIL	LRP	MOH	ROA	MOS	ATL	Total
1=	(Germany) Jörg Bergmeister	(United States) Flying Lizard Motorsports	20	20	25	8	20	10	16	20	18	157
1=	(United States) Patrick Long	(United States) Flying Lizard Motorsports	20	20	25	8	20	10	16	20	18	157
2	(Italy) Gianmaria Bruni	(United States) Risi Competizione	30	10	15	20	0	20	6	16	23	140
3=	(United States) Bill Auberlen	(United States) BMW Rahal Letterman Racing	26	13	8	16	16	13	0	13	20	125
3=	(United States) Tommy Milner	(United States) BMW Rahal Letterman Racing	26	13	8	16	16	13	0	13	20	125
4	(Brazil) Jaime Melo	(United States) Risi Competizione	30	10	15	20	0	20	6		14	115
5	(United Kingdom) Oliver Gavin	(United States) Corvette Racing	12	2	18	1	8	16	13	10	30	110
6	(Denmark) Jan Magnussen	(United States) Corvette Racing	13	16	11	13	0	0	10	10	30	103
7=	(Germany) Dirk Müller	(United States) BMW Rahal Letterman Racing	23	8	21	10	13	6	20	0	0	101
7=	(United States) Joey Hand	(United States) BMW Rahal Letterman Racing	23	8	21	10	13	6	20	0	0	101
8	(Monaco) Olivier Beretta	(United States) Corvette Racing	12	2	18	1	8	16	13	8	16	94
9	(United States) Johnny O'Connell	(United States) Corvette Racing	13	16	11	13	0	0	10	8	16	87
10=	(United States) Scott Sharp	(United States) Extreme Speed Motorsports	0	4	13	4	6	8	3	6	26	70
10=	(United States) Johannes van Overbeek	(United States) Extreme Speed Motorsports	0	4	13	4	6	8	3	6	26	70
11	(Finland) Toni Vilander	(United States) Risi Competizione				6		1		16	23	46
12	(Germany) Dirk Werner	(United States) BMW Rahal Letterman Racing	26								20	46
13=	(United States) Ed Brown	(United States) Extreme Speed Motorsports	16	3	0	3	1	0	8	3	11	45
13=	(United States) Guy Cosmo	(United States) Extreme Speed Motorsports	16	3	0	3	1	0	8	3	11	45
14	(Germany) Pierre Kaffer	(United States) Risi Competizione	30				10		4			44
15	(United States) Seth Neiman	(United States) Flying Lizard Motorsports	18	0	0	0	4	4	2	2	13	43
16	(France) Emmanuel Collard	(United States) Corvette Racing	12								30	42
17	(United States) Bryan Sellers	(United States) Team Falken Tire	0	6	9	2	3	3	1	4	12	40
18	(United States) Darren Law	(United States) Flying Lizard Motorsports	18	0	0	0	4		2	2	13	39
19	(Germany) Marc Lieb	(United States) Flying Lizard Motorsports	20								18	38
20	(Spain) Antonio García	(United States) Corvette Racing	13								16	29
21	(Finland) Mika Salo	(United States) Risi Competizione					10		4		14	28
22	(Germany) Wolf Henzler	(United States) Team Falken Tire	0	6	9	2	3	3	1	4		28
23	(Portugal) João Barbosa	(United States) Extreme Speed Motorsports	16								11	27
24	(Germany) Dominik Farnbacher	(United States) Extreme Speed Motorsports									26	26
25	(United Kingdom) Andy Priaulx	(United States) BMW Rahal Letterman Racing	23								0	23
26	(Italy) Giancarlo Fisichella	(United States) Risi Competizione				6		1			14	21
27=	(United States) Tracy Krohn	(United States) Risi Competizione	14		7							21
27=	(Sweden) Niclas Jönsson	(United States) Risi Competizione	14		7							21
28	(Austria) Richard Lietz	(United States) Flying Lizard Motorsports	18									18
29=	(United States) David Murry	(United States) Robertson Racing	11	1	6	0	0	0	0	0	0	18
29=	(United States) David Robertson	(United States) Robertson Racing	11	1	6	0		0	0	0	0	18
30	(United States) Andrea Robertson	(United States) Robertson Racing	11		6	0	0	0	0	0	0	17
31	(Belgium) Eric van de Poele	(United States) Risi Competizione	14									14
32	(Germany) Marco Holzer	(United States) Flying Lizard Motorsports									13	13
33	(Austria) Martin Ragginger	(United States) Team Falken Tire									12	12
34	(Belgium) Marc Goossens	(United States) Jaguar RSR			0	0	2	2	0	1	0	5
35	(France) Patrick Pilet	(United States) Flying Lizard Motorsports						4				4
36	(United States) Paul Gentilozzi	(United States) Jaguar RSR						2	0	1	0	3
37	(United Kingdom) Ryan Dalziel	(United States) Jaguar RSR		0	0	0	2				0	2

==== GTC standings ====
Pos	Driver	Team	SEB	LBH	LGA	MIL	LRP	MOH	ROA	MOS	ATL	Total
1=	(Netherlands) Jeroen Bleekemolen	(United States) Black Swan Racing		3	25	20	16	20	20	16	26	146
1=	(United States) Tim Pappas	(United States) Black Swan Racing		3	25	20	16	20	20	16	26	146
2	(United States) Shane Lewis	(United States) Velox Motorsports	18	10	11	10	13	8	13	20	23	126
3	(United States) Andy Lally	(United States) TRG	16	2	21	16	20		8	0	30	113
4	(France) Henri Richard	(United States) TRG	16	2	21	16	20	6		0	30	111
5	(United States) Bill Sweedler	(United States) Alex Job Racing	26	13	9	3	6	13	10	13	16	109
6	(United States) Romeo Kapudija	(United States) Alex Job Racing	26	13	9	3	6	13	10		16	96
7=	(United States) Galen Bieker	(United States) WERKS II Racing	20	6	8	13			16		18	81
7=	(United States) Robert Rodriguez	(United States) WERKS II Racing	20	6	8	13			16		18	81
8	(United States) Lawson Aschenbach	(United States) Velox Motorsports	18		11					20	23	72
9=	(Mexico) Juan González	(United States) Alex Job Racing	30	20	18	0						68
9=	(United States) Butch Leitzinger	(United States) Alex Job Racing	30	20	18	0						68
10=	(United States) Bret Curtis	(United States) GMG Racing	14	16	0	4	10	16				60
10=	(United States) James Sofronas	(United States) GMG Racing	14	16	0	4	10	16				60
11	(United States) Jerry Vento	(United States) Velox Motorsports	18	10		10	13	8			0	59
12	(United States) Bryce Miller	(United States) Orbit Racing		8	13	8	8	10		10		57
13	(United States) Duncan Ende	(United States) TRG	16						8		30	54
14	(Germany) Jan-Dirk Leuders	(United States) Alex Job Racing	26		9						16	51
15=	(United States) Doug Baron	(United States) 911 Design		0	7	6		4	6		20	43
15=	(United States) Loren Beggs	(United States) 911 Design		0	7	6		4	6		20	43
16=	(Mexico) Luis Díaz	(United States) Car Amigo AJR	23	4	15	0						42
16=	(Mexico) Ricardo González	(United States) Car Amigo AJR	23	4	15	0						42
17	(United States) Rene Villeneuve	(United States) TRG			21						20	41
18	(United Kingdom) Luke Hines	(United States) Orbit Racing			0	8	8	10		10		36
19	(United States) Leh Keen	(United States) Alex Job Racing	30									30
20	(Netherlands) Sebastiaan Bleekemolen	(United States) Black Swan Racing									26	26
21	(United States) Patrick Kelly	(United States) Car Amigo AJR	23									23
22	(United States) John McMullen	(United States) Orbit Racing		8	13							21
23	(United States) Cory Friedman	(United States) WERKS II Racing	20									20
24	(United States) Kris Wilson	(United States) WERKS II Racing									18	18
25	(United States) Andy Pilgrim	(United States) GMG Racing	14									14
26	(United States) Vic Rice	(United States) Velox Motorsports							13			13
27	(United States) Mitch Pagerey	(United States) Alex Job Racing								13		13
28	(United States) Spencer Pumpelly	(United States) TRG						6				6

== Team changes ==
- Scott Sharp has created a new racing team, Extreme Speed Motorsports, for the 2010 season, and will be entering two Ferrari F430s in the GT class.
- Rahal Letterman Racing have re-signed Bill Auberlen, Joey Hand, Tommy Milner and Dirk Müller for 2010.
- Acura confirmed in November 2009 that they would return for the 2010 season with Highcroft Racing.
- Simon Pagenaud will be joining Highcroft Racing for 2010. In addition, Marino Franchitti will join David Brabham and Pagenaud for three events at Sebring, Mazda Raceway Laguna Seca and Petit Le Mans.
- AutoCon Motorsports have signed Pierre Ehret to drive their LMP Lola at Sebring, Petit Le Mans, and Laguna Seca. They also confirmed that regular drivers Bryan Willman and Tony Burgess will return for 2010, although former lead driver Chris McMurry has retired.
- Intersport Racing has announced its LMPC lineup consists of Patrón GT3 Challenge drivers Mitch Pagerey and Brian Wong.
- 2010 marked the withdrawal of the Dodge Viper from the series.
