= 2010 Grand Prix of Mosport =

Mosport International Raceway

The 2010 Grand Prix of Mosport presented by Mobil 1 was the penultimate round of the 2010 American Le Mans Series season. It took place at Mosport International Raceway on August 29, 2010. The race marked the 100th ALMS race that David Brabham has competed in. As a result, the Patrón Highcroft team changed the car's number to No. 100 from No. 1 to mark the occasion.

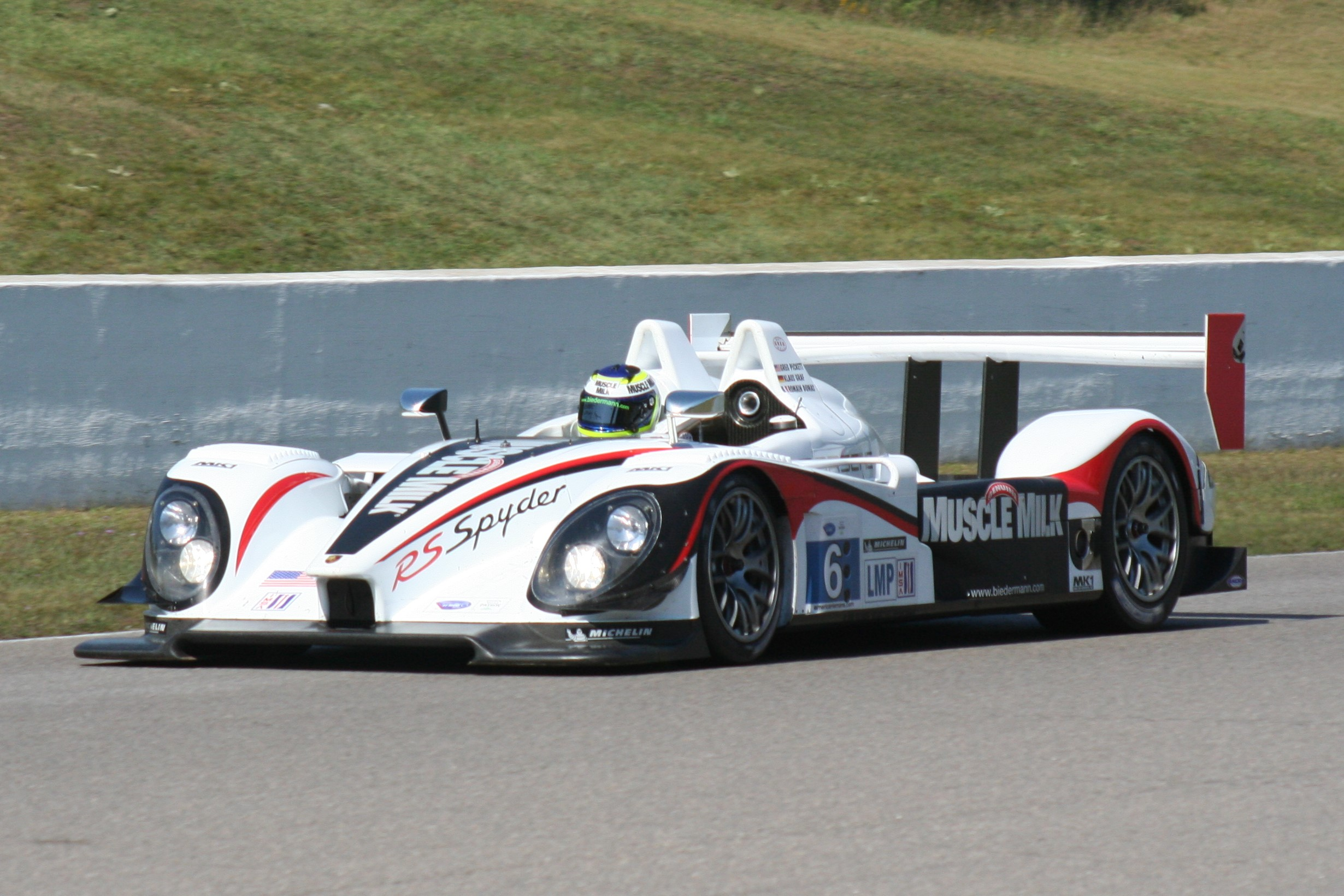
Muscle Milk Team Cytosport Porsche RS Spyder Evo - Winner 2010 Grand Prix of Mosport

== Qualifying ==
=== Qualifying result ===
Pole position winners in each class are marked in bold.

Pos	Class	Team	Driver	Lap Time	Grid
1	**LMP**	**#6 Muscle Milk Team Cytosport**	**Klaus Graf**	**1:06.956**	**1**
2	LMP	#16 Dyson Racing Team	Chris Dyson	1:07.142	2
3	LMP	#100 Patrón Highcroft Racing	Simon Pagenaud	1:07.228	3
4	LMP	#8 Drayson Racing	Jonny Cocker	1:07.482	4
5	LMP	#12 Autocon Motorsports	Johnny Mowlem	1:08.117	5
6	**LMPC**	**#52 PR1/Mathiasen Motorsports**	**Luis Díaz**	**1:11.455**	**6**
7	LMPC	#36 Genoa Racing	Frankie Montecalvo	1:12.013	7
8	LMPC	#99 Green Earth Team Gunnar	Gunnar Jeannette	1:12.073	8
9	LMPC	#89 Intersport Racing	Kyle Marcelli	1:12.239	9
10	LMPC	#55 Level 5 Motorsports	Christophe Bouchut	1:12.260	10
11	GT	#62 Risi Competizione	Gianmaria Bruni	1:17.160	27
12	**GT**	**#45 Flying Lizard Motorsports**	**Jörg Bergmeister**	**1:17.461**	**11**
13	GT	#92 BMW Rahal Letterman Racing	Tommy Milner	1:17.491	12
14	GT	#4 Corvette Racing	Oliver Gavin	1:17.668	13
15	GT	#01 Extreme Speed Motorsports	Scott Sharp	1:17.726	14
16	GT	#3 Corvette Racing	Johnny O'Connell	1:17.794	15
17	GT	#90 BMW Rahal Letterman Racing	Dirk Müller	1:17.841	16
18	GT	#17 Team Falken Tire	Bryan Sellers	1:18.469	17
19	GT	#40 Robertson Racing	David Murry	1:18.502	18
20	GT	#75 Jaguar RSR	Marc Goossens	1:19.099	19
21	GT	#02 Extreme Speed Motorsports	Ed Brown	1:21.771	20
22	GT	#44 Flying Lizard Motorsports	Seth Neiman	1:21.798	28
23	LMPC	#95 Level 5 Motorsports	Scott Tucker	1:22.081	21
24	**GTC**	**#48 ORBIT/Paul Miller Racing**	**Bryce Miller**	**1:22.495**	**22**
25	GTC	#54 Black Swan Racing	Jeroen Bleekemolen	1:22.598	23
26	GTC	#88 Velox Motorsports	Shane Lewis	1:22.911	24
27	GTC	#63 TRG	Andy Lally	1:23.211	29
28	GTC	#23 Alex Job Racing	Mitch Pagerey	1:23.324	25
29	LMP	#37 Intersport Racing	No Time		26

== Race ==
The race was scheduled for two hours and 45 minutes; however, the race was stopped early after a major crash involving the #8 Drayson LMP and #48 Orbit GTC about two hours into the race. Following a lengthy red flag period, race officials decided to end the event early due to repairs to the track barriers projected to take nearly three hours. The race was resumed under caution for a single lap before the checkered flag was shown. For its part in the incident, the #8 Drayson entry was demoted to the last car on their lap, demoting them two places. (The two cars ahead of the Drayson entry were LMPC cars, so the LMP standings were unaffected.)

=== Race result ===
Class winners in bold. Cars failing to complete 70% of their class winner's distance are marked as Not Classified (NC).

Pos	Class	No	Team	Drivers	Chassis	Tire	Laps
Pos	Class	No	Team	Drivers	Engine	Tire	Laps
1	**LMP**	**6**	**(United States) Muscle Milk Team Cytosport**	**(France) Romain Dumas (Germany) Klaus Graf**	**Porsche RS Spyder Evo**	MI	**99**
1	**LMP**	**6**	**(United States) Muscle Milk Team Cytosport**	**(France) Romain Dumas (Germany) Klaus Graf**	**Porsche MR6 3.4 L V8**	MI	**99**
2	LMP	100	(United States) Patrón Highcroft Racing	(Australia) David Brabham (France) Simon Pagenaud	HPD ARX-01C	MI	99
2	LMP	100	(United States) Patrón Highcroft Racing	(Australia) David Brabham (France) Simon Pagenaud	HPD AL7.R 3.4 L V8	MI	99
3	LMP	12	(United States) Autocon Motorsports	(United Kingdom) Johnny Mowlem (Canada) Tony Burgess	Lola B06/10	D	98
3	LMP	12	(United States) Autocon Motorsports	(United Kingdom) Johnny Mowlem (Canada) Tony Burgess	AER P32C 4.0 L Turbo V8 (E85 Ethanol)	D	98
4	**LMPC**	**99**	**(United States) Green Earth Team Ginnar**	**(United States) Gunnar Jeannette (United States) Elton Julian**	**Oreca FLM09**	MI	**95**
4	**LMPC**	**99**	**(United States) Green Earth Team Ginnar**	**(United States) Gunnar Jeannette (United States) Elton Julian**	**Chevrolet LS3 6.2 L V8**	MI	**95**
5	LMPC	55	(United States) Level 5 Motorsports	(United States) Scott Tucker (France) Christophe Bouchut	Oreca FLM09	MI	95
5	LMPC	55	(United States) Level 5 Motorsports	(United States) Scott Tucker (France) Christophe Bouchut	Chevrolet LS3 6.2 L V8	MI	95
6	LMP	8	(United Kingdom) Drayson Racing	(United Kingdom) Paul Drayson (United Kingdom) Jonny Cocker	Lola B09/60	MI	95
6	LMP	8	(United Kingdom) Drayson Racing	(United Kingdom) Paul Drayson (United Kingdom) Jonny Cocker	Judd GV5.5 S2 5.5 L V10 (E85 Ethanol)	MI	95
7	LMP	16	(United States) Dyson Racing Team	(United States) Chris Dyson (United Kingdom) Guy Smith	Lola B09/86	D	94
7	LMP	16	(United States) Dyson Racing Team	(United States) Chris Dyson (United Kingdom) Guy Smith	Mazda MZR-R 2.0 L Turbo I4 (Isobutanol)	D	94
8	LMPC	36	(United States) Genoa Racing	(United States) Frankie Montecalvo (Germany) Christian Zugel	Oreca FLM09	MI	93
8	LMPC	36	(United States) Genoa Racing	(United States) Frankie Montecalvo (Germany) Christian Zugel	Chevrolet LS3 6.2 L V8	MI	93
9	LMPC	95	(United States) Level 5 Motorsports	(United States) Scott Tucker (United Kingdom) Andy Wallace	Oreca FLM09	MI	93
9	LMPC	95	(United States) Level 5 Motorsports	(United States) Scott Tucker (United Kingdom) Andy Wallace	Chevrolet LS3 6.2 L V8	MI	93
10	LMPC	52	(United States) PR1/Mathiasen Motorsports	(Mexico) Ricardo González (Mexico) Luis Díaz	Oreca FLM09	MI	92
10	LMPC	52	(United States) PR1/Mathiasen Motorsports	(Mexico) Ricardo González (Mexico) Luis Díaz	Chevrolet LS3 6.2 L V8	MI	92
11	**GT**	**45**	**(United States) Flying Lizard Motorsports**	**(Germany) Jörg Bergmeister (United States) Patrick Long**	**Porsche 997 GT3-RSR**	MI	**92**
11	**GT**	**45**	**(United States) Flying Lizard Motorsports**	**(Germany) Jörg Bergmeister (United States) Patrick Long**	**Porsche 4.0 L Flat-6 (E85 Ethanol)**	MI	**92**
12	GT	62	(United States) Risi Competizione	(Finland) Toni Vilander (Italy) Gianmaria Bruni	Ferrari F430 GTE	MI	92
12	GT	62	(United States) Risi Competizione	(Finland) Toni Vilander (Italy) Gianmaria Bruni	Ferrari 4.0 L V8 (E85 Ethanol)	MI	92
13	GT	92	(United States) BMW Rahal Letterman Racing	(United States) Bill Auberlen (United States) Tommy Milner	BMW M3 GT2	D	92
13	GT	92	(United States) BMW Rahal Letterman Racing	(United States) Bill Auberlen (United States) Tommy Milner	BMW 4.0 L V8 (E85 Ethanol)	D	92
14	GT	4	(United States) Corvette Racing	(Denmark) Jan Magnussen (United Kingdom) Oliver Gavin	Chevrolet Corvette C6.R	MI	92
14	GT	4	(United States) Corvette Racing	(Denmark) Jan Magnussen (United Kingdom) Oliver Gavin	Chevrolet 5.5 L V8 (E85 Ethanol)	MI	92
15	GT	3	(United States) Corvette Racing	(Monaco) Olivier Beretta (United States) Johnny O'Connell	Chevrolet Corvette C6.R	MI	92
15	GT	3	(United States) Corvette Racing	(Monaco) Olivier Beretta (United States) Johnny O'Connell	Chevrolet 5.5 L V8 (E85 Ethanol)	MI	92
16	GT	01	(United States) Extreme Speed Motorsports	(United States) Scott Sharp (United States) Johannes van Overbeek	Ferrari F430 GTE	MI	91
16	GT	01	(United States) Extreme Speed Motorsports	(United States) Scott Sharp (United States) Johannes van Overbeek	Ferrari 4.0 L V8	MI	91
17	LMPC	89	(United States) Intersport Racing	(Canada) Kyle Marcelli (United States) Chapman Ducote	Oreca FLM09	MI	91
17	LMPC	89	(United States) Intersport Racing	(Canada) Kyle Marcelli (United States) Chapman Ducote	Chevrolet LS3 6.2 L V8	MI	91
18	GT	17	(United States) Team Falken Tire	(United States) Bryan Sellers (Germany) Wolf Henzler	Porsche 997 GT3-RSR	FAL	91
18	GT	17	(United States) Team Falken Tire	(United States) Bryan Sellers (Germany) Wolf Henzler	Porsche 4.0 L Flat-6	FAL	91
19	GT	02	(United States) Extreme Speed Motorsports	(United States) Ed Brown (United States) Guy Cosmo	Ferrari F430 GTE	MI	90
19	GT	02	(United States) Extreme Speed Motorsports	(United States) Ed Brown (United States) Guy Cosmo	Ferrari 4.0 L V8	MI	90
20	GT	44	(United States) Flying Lizard Motorsports	(United States) Darren Law (United States) Seth Neiman	Porsche 997 GT3-RSR	MI	90
20	GT	44	(United States) Flying Lizard Motorsports	(United States) Darren Law (United States) Seth Neiman	Porsche 4.0 L Flat-6 (E85 Ethanol)	MI	90
21	GT	75	(United States) Jaguar RSR	(United States) Paul Gentilozzi (Belgium) Marc Goossens	Jaguar XKRS	Y	87
21	GT	75	(United States) Jaguar RSR	(United States) Paul Gentilozzi (Belgium) Marc Goossens	Jaguar 5.0 L V8	Y	87
22	**GTC**	**88**	**(United States) Velox Motorsports**	**(United States) Shane Lewis (United States) Lawson Aschenbach**	**Porsche 997 GT3 Cup**	Y	**86**
22	**GTC**	**88**	**(United States) Velox Motorsports**	**(United States) Shane Lewis (United States) Lawson Aschenbach**	**Porsche 3.8 L Flat-6**	Y	**86**
23	GTC	54	(United States) Black Swan Racing	(United States) Tim Pappas (Netherlands) Jeroen Bleekemolen	Porsche 997 GT3 Cup	Y	86
23	GTC	54	(United States) Black Swan Racing	(United States) Tim Pappas (Netherlands) Jeroen Bleekemolen	Porsche 3.8 L Flat-6	Y	86
24	GTC	23	(United States) Alex Job Racing	(United States) Bill Sweedler (United States) Mitch Pagerey	Porsche 997 GT3 Cup	Y	86
24	GTC	23	(United States) Alex Job Racing	(United States) Bill Sweedler (United States) Mitch Pagerey	Porsche 3.8 L Flat-6	Y	86
25 DNF	GTC	48	(United States) ORBIT/Paul Miller Racing	(United States) Bryce Miller (United Kingdom) Luke Hines	Porsche 997 GT3 Cup	Y	78
25 DNF	GTC	48	(United States) ORBIT/Paul Miller Racing	(United States) Bryce Miller (United Kingdom) Luke Hines	Porsche 3.8 L Flat-6	Y	78
26 DNF	GT	90	(United States) BMW Rahal Letterman Racing	(Germany) Dirk Müller (United States) Joey Hand	BMW M3 GT2	D	48
26 DNF	GT	90	(United States) BMW Rahal Letterman Racing	(Germany) Dirk Müller (United States) Joey Hand	BMW 4.0 L V8 (E85 Ethanol)	D	48
27 DNF	GT	40	(United States) Robertson Racing	(United States) David Robertson (United States) Andrea Robertson (United States) David Murry	Ford GT-R Mk. VII	D	48
27 DNF	GT	40	(United States) Robertson Racing	(United States) David Robertson (United States) Andrea Robertson (United States) David Murry	Ford 5.0 L V8	D	48
28 DNF	LMP	37	(United States) Intersport Racing	(United States) Jon Field (United States) Clint Field	Lola B06/10	D	43
28 DNF	LMP	37	(United States) Intersport Racing	(United States) Jon Field (United States) Clint Field	AER P32C 4.0 L Turbo V8 (E85 Ethanol)	D	43
29 DNF	GTC	63	(United States) TRG	(France) Henri Richard (United States) Andy Lally	Porsche 997 GT3 Cup	Y	32
29 DNF	GTC	63	(United States) TRG	(France) Henri Richard (United States) Andy Lally	Porsche 3.8 L Flat-6	Y	32
WD	GT	61	(United States) Risi Competizione	(Germany) Pierre Kaffer (Finland) Toni Vilander	Ferrari F430 GTE	MI	-
WD	GT	61	(United States) Risi Competizione	(Germany) Pierre Kaffer (Finland) Toni Vilander	Ferrari 4.0 L V8 (E85 Ethanol)	MI	-
FINAL RACE REPORT

American Le Mans Series
Previous race: ALMS powered by eStar	2010 season	Next race: Petit Le Mans
