= Romeo Kapudija =

American-Croatian racing driver

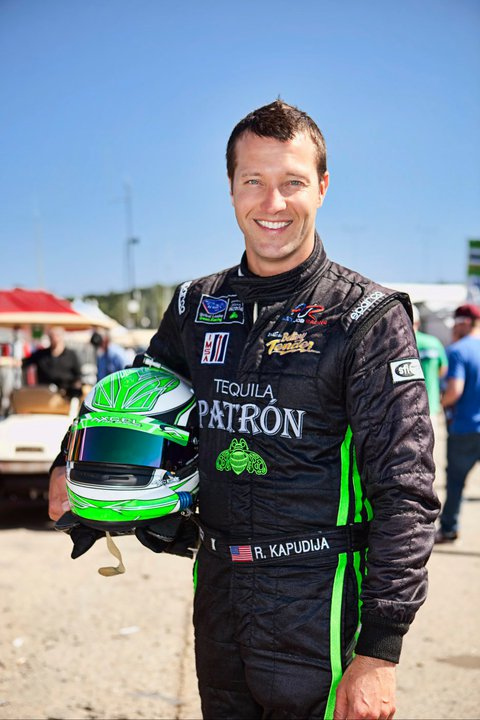
Driver photo

Romeo Kapudija (born 20 May 1970) is an American-Croatian professional race car driver from Chicago, Illinois.

After competing in karting and amateur Formula Atlantic and Skip Barber Formula Dodge competition, Kapudija made his first professional Toyota Atlantic start in 1999 at Long Beach finishing 11th overall in first in C2. He continued to race in the professional ranks in 2002 driving part-time in the American Le Mans Series in the GT class. He competed in the 12 Hours of Sebring in 2004 and competed in Grand-Am Cup from 2005 to 2007 as co-driver to Patrick Dempsey. He moved up to Grand-Am's Rolex Sports Car Series GT class in 2008 driving for Matt Connelly Motorsports. In 2010, he made his Daytona Prototype debut at the 2010 24 Hours of Daytona co-driving Beyer Racing's Chevy-Crawford. In 2010, he competed full-time in the American Le Mans Series' new GTC class driving for Alex Job Racing.

== Complete motorsports results ==
=== American Open-Wheel racing results ===
(key) (Races in bold indicate pole position, races in italics indicate fastest race lap)

==== Atlantic Championship ====
Year	Team	1	2	3	4	5	6	7	8	9	10	11	12	Rank	Points
1999	Olsson Engineering	LBH; 11	NAZ	GAT	MIL	MTL	ROA	TRR	MOH	CHI	VAN	LS	HOU	**N.C.**	**N.C.**

==== Complete USF2000 National Championship results ====
Year	Entrant	1	2	3	4	5	6	7	8	9	10	11	12	Pos	Points
2003	Battery Tender Racing	SEB1; 16	SEB2; 25	LRP1	LRP1	MOH1	MOH2	ROA1	ROA2	MOH3	MOH4	ATL1	ATL2	**28th**	**6**
