= Bret Curtis =

American racing driver

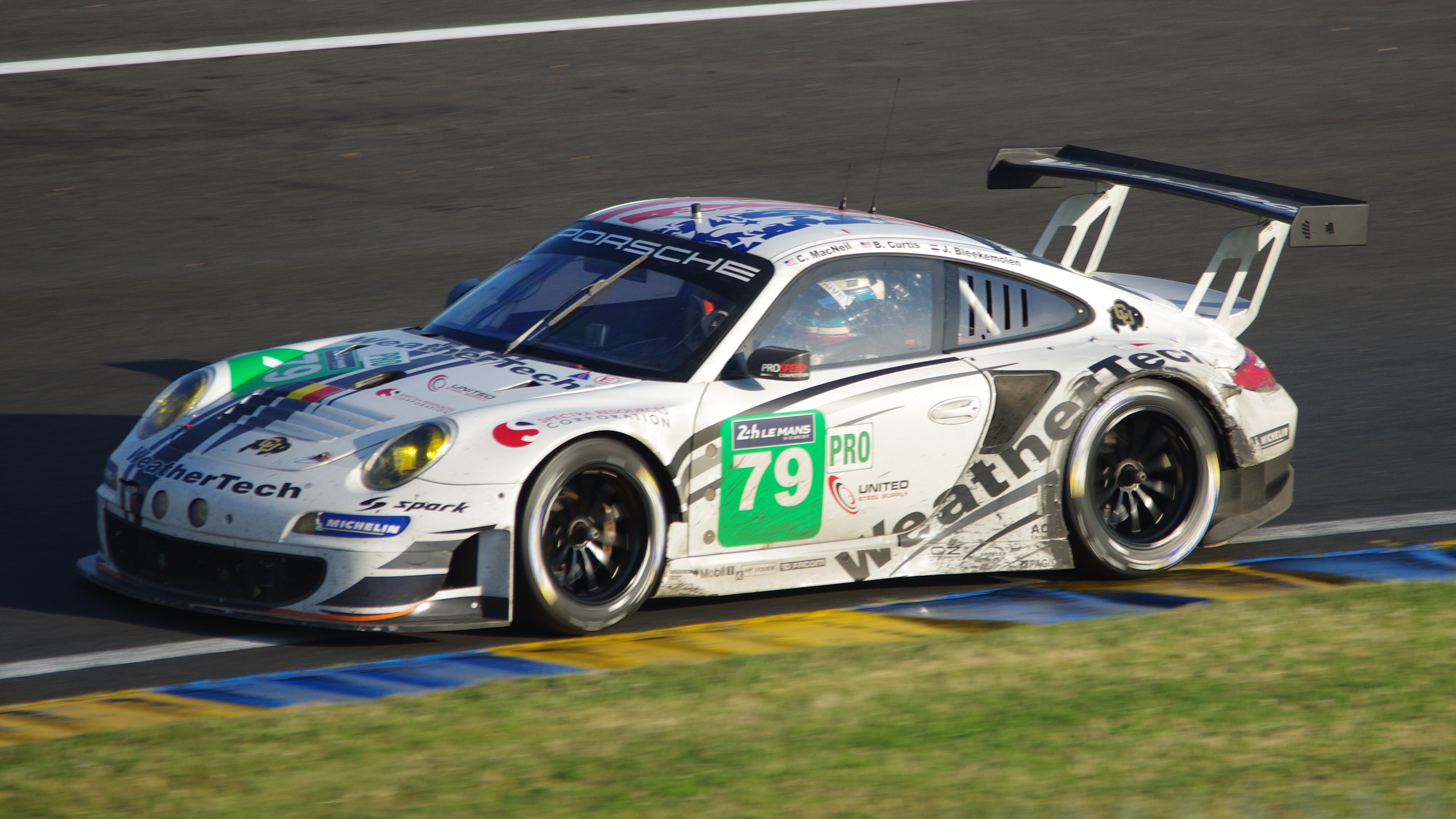
- Curtis' Prospeed Porsche in 2014
- Nationality: (United States) American
- Born: December 13, 1966 (age 59) Bryn Mawr, Pennsylvania, U.S.
- Categorisation: FIA Bronze

Bret Curtis (born December 13, 1966) is an American auto racing driver and business entrepreneur. He founded Spectra Resources in 2002 and United Steel Supply in 2007. Curtis has been racing since 2009, and currently competes in the WeatherTech SportsCar Championship series for Turner Motorsport driving a BMW M6 GT3. Curtis has competed around the world in some of the most prestigious endurance races including 24 hours of Le Mans, 24 hours of Daytona, Spa 24 hours, Dubai 24 hour; 12 hours of Sebring, Bathurst 12 Hour; Petit Le Mans; and the 6 hours of Laguna Seca. Curtis placed second overall in the 2012 Bathurst 12 Hour driving for Erebus Racing/Black Falcon. Curtis placed second in the P2 class at the 2012 12 Hours of Sebring driving an LMP2 class Lola for Black Swan Racing. Curtis won the GTC class at the 2012 Six Hours of Laguna at Mazda Laguna Raceway. Curtis also competed in 2012 for Black Falcon Racing in the 2012 Blancpain Endurance Championship driving a Mercedes SLS GT3. Curtis also contested the 2012 24 Hours of Le Mans in the GTE class for Prospeed, driving a Porsche 911 RSR (997). Curtis placed sixth in the GTD class of the WeatherTech SportsCar championship in 2016 with a win at MOSPORT and a win at the Circuit of the Americas and a second place at the 12 hours of Sebring.

== Complete 24 Hours of Le Mans results ==
Year	Team	Co-drivers	Car	Class	Laps	Pos.	Class Pos.
2012	(Belgium) Prospeed Competition	(Saudi Arabia) Abdulaziz al Faisal (United Kingdom) Sean Edwards	Porsche 997 GT3-RSR	GTE; Am	180	DNF	DNF
2017	(United States) Scuderia Corsa	(Denmark) Christina Nielsen (Italy) Alessandro Balzan	Ferrari 488 GTE	GTE; Am	314	44th	14th

== Complete WeatherTech SportsCar Championship results ==
(key) (Races in bold indicate pole position; results in italics indicate fastest lap)

Year	Team	Class	Make	Engine	1	2	3	4	5	6	7	8	9	10	11	12	Pos.	Points
2016	Turner Motorsport	GTD	BMW M6 GT3	BMW 4.4 L V8	DAY; 22	SEB; 2	LGA; 5	BEL; 9	WGL; 13	MOS; 1	LIM; 6	ELK; 7	VIR; 11	AUS; 1	PET; 9		6th	279
2017	Turner Motorsport	GTD	BMW M6 GT3	BMW 4.4 L V8	DAY	SEB	LBH; 9	AUS; 5	BEL; 4	WGL	MOS; 4	LIM	ELK	VIR	LGA	PET	26th	104
2021	Scuderia Corsa	GTD	Ferrari 488 GT3 Evo 2020	Ferrari F154CB 3.9 L Turbo V8	DAY; 14	SEB	MDO	DET	WGL	WGL	LIM	ELK	LGA	LBH	VIR	PET	68th	194
