= CytoSport =

American nutritional food company

CytoSport, Inc
- Product type: Protein drink Other protein supplement products
- Current owner: PepsiCo (via Gatorade)
- Country: United States
- Introduced: 1998
- Previous owners: Hormel Foods
- Website: musclemilk.com

CytoSport is an American manufacturer of sports-oriented nutritional products, or "supplements" based in Benicia, California. It is a subsidiary of PepsiCo organized under the Gatorade line of products, and is primarily known for its line of Muscle Milk protein supplement products, primarily in the form of ready-to-drink beverages and powders. In Canada, the product is branded as Muscle Mlk, a modification required in Canada to avoid confusion with milk. CytoSport also formerly produced supplemental products under the Monster Milk and CytoMax brands.

== History ==
CytoSport was founded in 1998 by the father/son team of Greg and Mike Pickett. It produces its powder products and pre-blends of ready-to-drink products at a 150,000-square-foot (14,000 m^{2}) manufacturing facility.

Its products are endorsed by running back Adrian Peterson and by college swimming coach Mike Bottom.

TSG Consumer Partners has financed Cytosport. The company reportedly earned US$200 million in 2008, and received the Small Company of the Year Award at the 16th annual Beverage Forum presented by Beverage World magazine and Beverage Marketing Corporation. Hormel announced it was acquiring CytoSport for $450 million in 2014.

In February 2019, Hormel announced it was selling the CytoSport business to PepsiCo, Inc. for a purchase price of $465 million. The transaction included the Muscle Milk and Evolve sports nutrition brands and was completed in April 2019.

== Controversy ==
A June 2010 investigation by Consumer Reports, a US consumer advocacy magazine, found that two of Cytosport's Muscle Milk products contained levels of heavy metals near or exceeding levels proposed by the United States Pharmacopeia (USP). Muscle Milk's Chocolate powder had four heavy metals — cadmium, lead, arsenic, and mercury — and three of these metals were found to be at the highest levels of all the health drinks tested. Average cadmium levels of 5.6 μg in three daily servings exceeded the USP limit of 5 μg per day, and the average lead level of 13.5 μg also topped the USP limit of 10 μg per day. The average arsenic level of 12.2 μg was near the USP limit of 15 μg per day. Muscle Milk's Vanilla Crème powder had 12.2 μg of lead in three daily servings, exceeding the lead limits, and 11.2 μg of arsenic. In response, CytoSport said, "Importantly, the tests underscored the fact that Muscle Milk Chocolate liquid shakes, by far and away our company's most popular consumer form of Muscle Milk, did not exceed the proposed maximum levels of any heavy metals tested, even when used three times per day." CytoSport's founder, Greg Pickett, also indicated that NSF International released a conclusion that its own test results 'do not reflect the concentrations stated in the Consumer Reports article.'" In turn, Consumer Reports provided their rebuttal, defending their statements.

On June 8, 2009, it was reported that The National Advertising Division (NAD) of the Council of Better Business Bureaus (BBB) was referring advertising claims made by CytoSport Beverage Co. for its Muscle Milk product to the U.S. Federal Trade Commission and U.S. Food and Drug Administration for review. Under its National Advertising Review Council terms, NAD had asked Cytosport to substantiate certain claims following a challenge to its advertising filed by Nestle USA. Nestle said the marketing of Muscle Milk was false and misleading, alleging consumers would be misled into thinking it is a supplemented milk product instead of a dietary supplement. CytoSport said its product claims are truthful and non-misleading, and that the product name is a non-deceptive registered trademark; it declined to participate in the NAD review, stating the review was unnecessary and inappropriate.

On May 6, 2009, in Sacramento, California, a federal court issued a preliminary injunction requiring Vital Pharmaceuticals, Inc. (VPX) to immediately remove Muscle Power from the marketplace, after concluding that the product infringes on CytoSport's trademark rights of Muscle Milk. This was prompted after CytoSport filed a lawsuit against VPX, stating that Muscle Power's packaging, or "trade dress", was deceptively similar to Muscle Milk's packaging. The court held that "VPX has chosen an identical font, in an identical color, on an identically shaped package, and placed the mark on the package in an identical location."

== Muscle Milk Pickett Racing ==
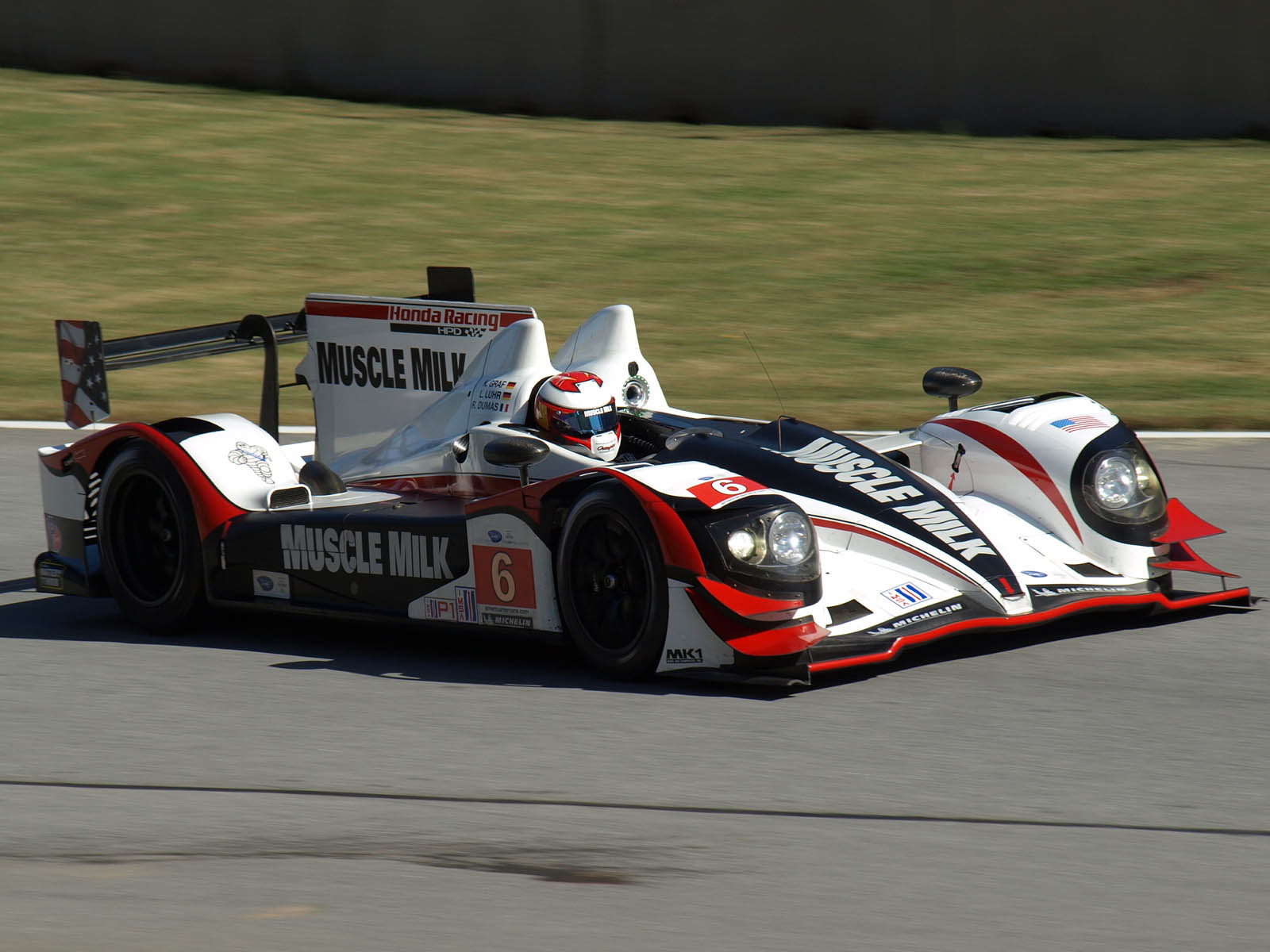
Muscle Milk Pickett Racings HPD ARX-03a at the 2012 Petit Le Mans

Muscle Milk owner and founder, Greg Pickett, has also been involved in a championship winning North American sports car racing team. Founded in 2007, Pickett's team has competed in the American Le Mans Series the 24 Hours of Le Mans and Tudor United SportsCar Championship. The team's successes include overall and class victories as well as the 2012 and 2013 American Le Mans Series LMP1 Drivers' and Teams' Championship. The team officially closed operations on May 16, 2014, with Greg Pickett focusing his attention back on the expansion of his Muscle Milk brand.
