= 2014 Chevrolet Sports Car Classic =

Fifth round of the 2014 United SportsCar Championship season

The layout of The Raceway on Belle Isle

The 2014 Chevrolet Sports Car Classic was a sports car race sanctioned by the International Motor Sports Association (IMSA). The race was held at The Raceway on Belle Isle in Detroit, Michigan on May 31, 2014. The race was the fifth of thirteen scheduled rounds of the 2014 United SportsCar Championship, and was held for Prototype and Grand Touring Daytona (GTD) categories.

== Background ==
=== Preview ===
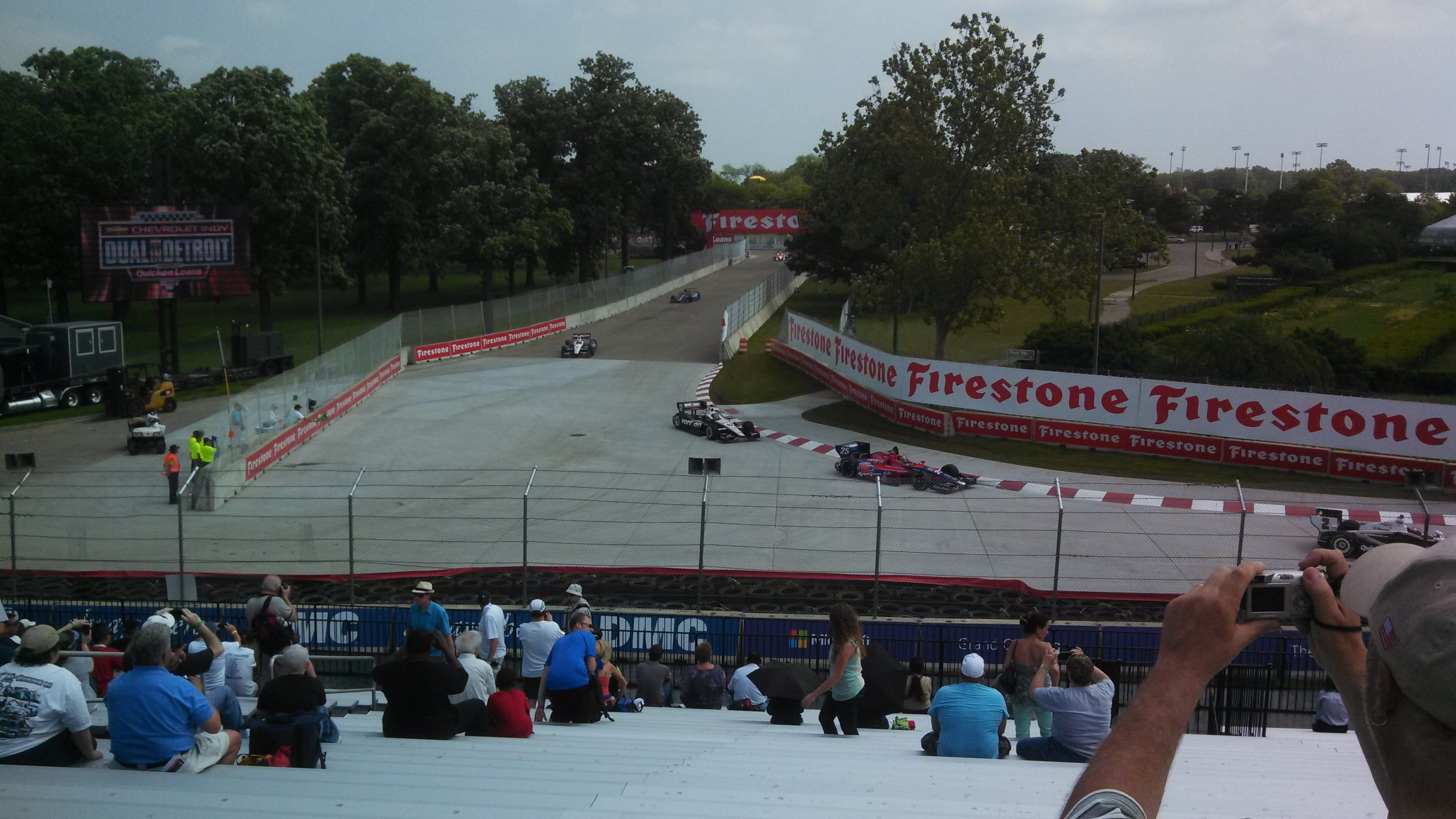
The Raceway on Belle Isle, where the race was held.

Similar to the Grand Prix of Long Beach, this event was held in conjunction with the Detroit Grand Prix in the IndyCar series, with one event held on the same day as the IMSA event, and another held a day after as a double-header.

International Motor Sports Association (IMSA) president Scott Atherton confirmed that the race was part of the 2014 United SportsCar Championship schedule in September 2013. It was the first year that the race was part of the series calendar, and the fifth annual running of the race, counting the period between 2007 and 2013 when it was a round of the Rolex Sports Car Series and the American Le Mans Series respectively. The race was the fifth of 2014's thirteen scheduled IMSA automobile endurance races, the shortest of the season in terms of distance, and it was the third round not held as part of the North American Endurance Cup. The race was held at the fourteen-turn 2.350 mi (3.782 km) Belle Isle Park on May 31, 2014.

Before the race, João Barbosa and Christian Fittipaldi led the Prototype Drivers' Championship with 127 points, 3 points clear of Scott Pruett and Memo Rojas in second, and Jordan Taylor and Ricky Taylor with 124 points. With 87 points, Bill Sweedler and Townsend Bell led the GTD Drivers' Championship, ahead of Andy Lally and John Potter on countback with 87 points followed by Nelson Canache and Spencer Pumpelly with 83 points. Chevrolet and Ferrari were leading their respective Manufacturers' Championships, while Action Express Racing and AIM Autosport each led their own Teams' Championships.

=== Entry list ===
Thirty-two cars were entered for the Chevrolet Sports Car Classic, with most of the entries in the Grand Touring Daytona (GTD) category. Six Daytona Prototype (DP) chassis were represented in the Prototype class, including four Chevrolet Corvette DP cars and a duo of Riley MkXXVI vehicles. They were joined by five Le Mans Prototype 2 (LMP2) cars represented in the class. Speedsource fielded two Lola B08/80-Mazda cars, and Extreme Speed Motorsports (ESM) entered two HPD ARX-03b cars. OAK Racing entered one Morgan LMP2.

With the absence of the Prototype Challenge and Grand Touring Le Mans (GTLM) categories from the field, only two racing classes were represented in Belle Isle. GTD was represented by 20 entries from manufactures such as Aston Martin, Audi, BMW, Ferrari, Porsche, and SRT. Scuderia Corsa entered a second Ferrari 458 Italia GT3.

== Practice and qualifying ==
There were two practice sessions preceding the start of the race on Saturday, one on Friday morning and one on Friday afternoon. The first session lasted 90 minutes on Friday morning while the second session on Friday afternoon lasted 90 minutes.

In the first session, Oswaldo Negri's No. 60 MSR Riley lapped quickest at 1 minute, 26.475 seconds, 0.081 seconds faster than Christian Fittipaldi's No. 5 Corvette DP. Memo Rojas was third-fastest in CGR's No. 01 Riley, Jordan Taylor's No. 10 car placed fourth, and Ryan Dalziel's No. 1 ESM HPD rounded out the top five. James Davison's No. 007 TRG Aston Martin led GTD from Pumpelly's No. 45 Flying Lizard Audi and Davis' No. 27 Dempsey Porsche.

Pruett led the final session in the No. 01 CGR car with a lap of 1 minute, 26.582 seconds, 0.328 seconds faster than Westbrook's No. 90 Corvette DP. ESM were third after a lap from Dalziel in its No. 1 car. Yacamán No. 42 Morgan, along with Barbosa's No. 5 AER car were fourth and fifth. Audi paced GTD with Flying Lizard's No. 45 R8 of Pumpelly lapping at 1:33.756, ahead of Leh Keen's No. 22 AJR Porsche. Kuba Giermaziak set the third-fastest time in class in NGT Motorsport's No. 30 entry. The session ended prematurely when Sebastian Asch crashed at the No. 18 Mühlner Motorsports America entry in the closing minutes.

Friday afternoon's 35 minute two-group qualifying session gave 15-minute sessions to all categories. Cars in GTD were sent out first and, after a five-minute interval, Prototype vehicles drove onto the track. Regulations stipulated teams to nominate one qualifying driver, with the fastest laps determining each classes starting order. IMSA arranged the grid to put the Prototypes ahead of all GTD cars.

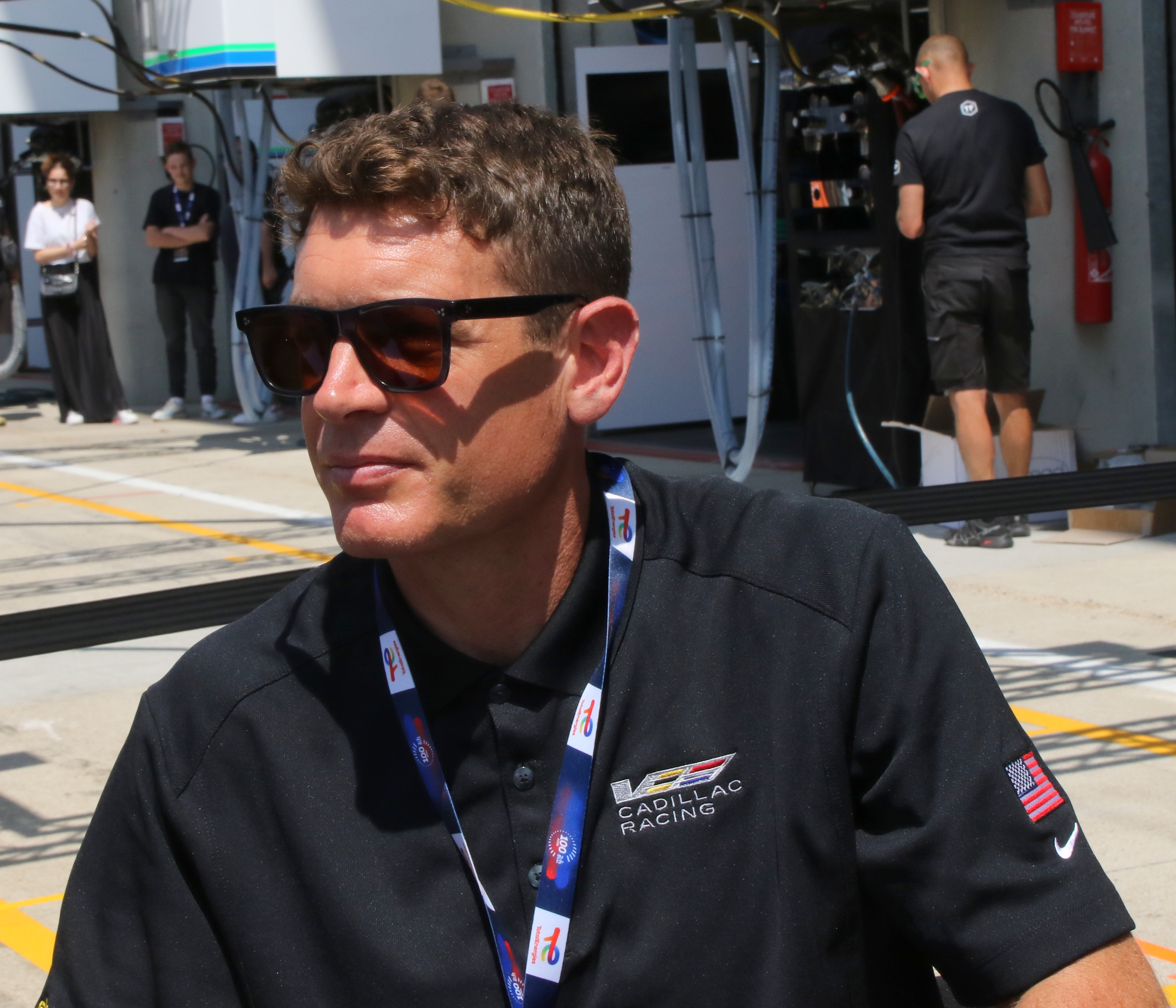
Richard Westbrook (pictured in 2006) helped clinch the No. 90 Corvette Daytona Prototype's first pole position of 2014.

Westbrook for Spirit of Daytona took the first pole position of his career, on his final lap with a time of 1 minute, 25.011 seconds. He was joined on the grid's front row by Dalziel who had pole position for ESM until Westbrook's lap. On his final timed lap, Fittipaldi qualified the No. 5 Corvette DP third, and Olivier Pla took fourth in the No. 42 OAK Racing Morgan. WTR's Jordan Taylor was fifth, and Negri's No. 60 MSR car was sixth. van Overbeek's No. 2 ESM car, Rojas' No. 01 CGR vehicle, and Said's No. 31 Marsh car were seventh to ninth.

In GTD, Spencer Pumpelly in the No. 45 Flying Lizard Audi clinched his second pole position of the season, with his fastest lap being 0.278 seconds faster than Jeroen Bleekemolen in the No. 33 Viper. Kévin Estre qualified the No. 73 PPM Porsche to third, ahead of Dane Cameron's fourth-placed Turner BMW and James Davison's fifth-placed TRG Aston Martin.

=== Qualifying results ===
Pole positions in each class are indicated in bold and by ‡.

Pos.	Class	No.	Team	Driver	Time	Gap	Grid
1	**P**	**90**	**(United States) Spirit of Daytona Racing**	**(United Kingdom) Richard Westbrook**	**1:25.011**	**_**	1‡
2	P	1	(United States) Extreme Speed Motorsports	(United Kingdom) Ryan Dalziel	1:25.029	+0.018	2
3	P	5	(United States) Action Express Racing	(Brazil) Christian Fittipaldi	1:25.139	+0.128	3
4	P	42	(France) OAK Racing	(France) Olivier Pla	1:25.555	+0.544	4
5	P	10	(United States) Wayne Taylor Racing	(United States) Jordan Taylor	1:25.586	+0.575	5
6	P	60	(United States) Michael Shank Racing with Curb/Agajanian	(Brazil) Oswaldo Negri	1:25.776	+0.765	6
7	P	2	(United States) Extreme Speed Motorsports	(United States) Johannes van Overbeek	1:26.192	+1.181	7
8	P	01	(United States) Chip Ganassi Racing with Felix Sabates	(Mexico) Memo Rojas	1:26.199	+1.188	8
9	P	31	(United States) Marsh Racing	(United States) Boris Said	1:26.952	+1.941	9
10	P	07	(United States) Speedsource	(United States) Joel Miller	1:31.344	+6.333	10
11	P	70	(United States) Speedsource	(Canada) Sylvain Tremblay	1:31.929	+6.918	11
12	**GTD**	**45**	**(United States) Flying Lizard Motorsports**	**(United States) Spencer Pumpelly**	**1:32.914**	**+7.903**	12‡
13	GTD	33	(United States) Riley Motorsports	(Netherlands) Jeroen Bleekemolen	1:33.192	+8.181	13
14	GTD	73	(United States) Park Place Motorsports	(France) Kévin Estre	1:33.246	+8.235	14
15	GTD	94	(United States) Turner Motorsport	(United States) Dane Cameron	1:33.346	+8.335	15
16	GTD	007	(United States) TRG-AMR North America	(Australia) James Davison	1:33.379	+8.368	16
17	GTD	22	(United States) Alex Job Racing	(United States) Leh Keen	1:33.383	+8.372	17
18	GTD	63	(United States) Scuderia Corsa	(Italy) Alessandro Balzan	1:33.560	+8.549	18
19	GTD	23	(United States) Team Seattle/Alex Job Racing	(Germany) Mario Farnbacher	1:33.691	+8.680	19
20	GTD	58	(United States) Snow Racing	(Belgium) Jan Heylen	1:33.717	+8.606	20
21	GTD	30	(United States) NGT Motorsport	(Poland) Kuba Giermaziak	1:33.897	+8.886	21
22	GTD	555	(Canada) AIM Autosport	(United States) Townsend Bell	1:34.051	+9.040	22
23	GTD	48	(United States) Paul Miller Racing	(Germany) Christopher Haase	1:34.057	+9.046	23
24	GTD	81	(United States) GB Autosport	(Republic of Ireland) Damien Faulkner	1:34.118	+9.107	24
25	GTD	35	(United States) Flying Lizard Motorsports	(United States) Dion von Moltke	1:34.218	+9.207	25
26	GTD	64	(United States) Scuderia Corsa	(Canada) Kyle Marcelli	1:34.359	+9.348	26
27	GTD	27	(United States) Dempsey Racing	(United States) Andrew Davis	1:34.577	+9.566	27
28	GTD	18	(Belgium) Mühlner Motorsports America	(Germany) Sebastian Asch	1:34.873	+9.862	28
29	GTD	46	(United States) Fall-Line Motorsports	(United States) Charles Espenlaub	1:34.968	+9.957	29
30	GTD	44	(United States) Magnus Racing	(United States) Andy Lally	1:34.969	+9.958	30
31	GTD	19	(Belgium) Mühlner Motorsports America	None	No Time Established		31
32	GTD	71	(United States) Park Place Motorsports	None	No Time Established		32

== Race ==
=== Post-race ===
With a total of 160 points, Jordan Taylor and Ricky Taylor's victory allowed them to take the lead of the Prototype Drivers' Championship. The final results of GTD meant Sweedler and Bell increased their advantage to 1 point as fifth-placed Keen and MacNeil moved from fourth to second. Lally and Potter dropped from second to third with 107 points, ahead of James and Farnbacher on countback. Miller and Haase's third-place finish meant they rounded out the top five with 102 points. Chevrolet and Ferrari continued to top their respective Manufacturers' Championships, while WTR took the lead of the Prototype Teams' Championship. AIM Autorsport kept their advantage in the GTD Teams' Championship with eight races left in the season.

=== Race result ===
Class winners are indicated in bold and ‡. P stands for Prototype, and GTD (Grand Touring Daytona).

Final race classification
Pos	Class	No.	Team	Drivers	Chassis	Tire	Laps	Time/Retired
Pos	Class	No.	Team	Drivers	Engine	Tire	Laps	Time/Retired
1	**P**	**10**	**(United States) Wayne Taylor Racing**	**(United States) Ricky Taylor (United States) Jordan Taylor**	**Chevrolet Corvette DP**	C	**57**	**1:40:26.112‡**
1	**P**	**10**	**(United States) Wayne Taylor Racing**	**(United States) Ricky Taylor (United States) Jordan Taylor**	**Chevrolet LS9 5.5 L V8**	C	**57**	**1:40:26.112‡**
2	P	90	(United States) Spirit of Daytona Racing	(Canada) Michael Valiante (United Kingdom) Richard Westbrook	Chevrolet Corvette DP	C	57	+0.207
2	P	90	(United States) Spirit of Daytona Racing	(Canada) Michael Valiante (United Kingdom) Richard Westbrook	Chevrolet LS9 5.5 L V8	C	57	+0.207
3	P	42	(France) OAK Racing	(France) Olivier Pla (Colombia) Gustavo Yacamán	Morgan LMP2	C	57	+8.817
3	P	42	(France) OAK Racing	(France) Olivier Pla (Colombia) Gustavo Yacamán	Nissan VK45DE 4.5 L V8	C	57	+8.817
4	P	60	(United States) Michael Shank Racing with Curb/Agajanian	(United States) John Pew (Brazil) Oswaldo Negri	Riley MkXXVI	C	57	+9.713
4	P	60	(United States) Michael Shank Racing with Curb/Agajanian	(United States) John Pew (Brazil) Oswaldo Negri	Ford EcoBoost 3.5 L Turbo V6	C	57	+9.713
5	P	1	(United States) Extreme Speed Motorsports	(United States) Scott Sharp (United Kingdom) Ryan Dalziel	HPD ARX-03b	C	57	+17.718
5	P	1	(United States) Extreme Speed Motorsports	(United States) Scott Sharp (United Kingdom) Ryan Dalziel	Honda HR28TT 2.8 L Turbo V6	C	57	+17.718
6	P	5	(United States) Action Express Racing	(Portugal) João Barbosa (Brazil) Christian Fittipaldi	Chevrolet Corvette DP	C	57	+33.286
6	P	5	(United States) Action Express Racing	(Portugal) João Barbosa (Brazil) Christian Fittipaldi	Chevrolet LS9 5.5 L V8	C	57	+33.286
7	P	2	(United States) Extreme Speed Motorsports	(United States) Ed Brown (United States) Johannes van Overbeek	HPD ARX-03b	C	56	+1 lap
7	P	2	(United States) Extreme Speed Motorsports	(United States) Ed Brown (United States) Johannes van Overbeek	Honda HR28TT 2.8 L Turbo V6	C	56	+1 lap
8	**GTD**	**63**	**(United States) Scuderia Corsa**	**(United States) Jeff Westphal (Italy) Alessandro Balzan**	**Ferrari 458 Italia GT3**	C	**56**	**+1 lap‡**
8	**GTD**	**63**	**(United States) Scuderia Corsa**	**(United States) Jeff Westphal (Italy) Alessandro Balzan**	**Ferrari 4.5L V8**	C	**56**	**+1 lap‡**
9	GTD	23	(United States) Team Seattle/Alex Job Racing	(United States) Ian James (Germany) Mario Farnbacher	Porsche 911 GT America	C	56	+1 lap
9	GTD	23	(United States) Team Seattle/Alex Job Racing	(United States) Ian James (Germany) Mario Farnbacher	Porsche 4.0L Flat-6	C	56	+1 lap
10	GTD	48	(United States) Paul Miller Racing	(United States) Bryce Miller (Germany) Christopher Haase	Audi R8 LMS ultra	C	56	+1 lap
10	GTD	48	(United States) Paul Miller Racing	(United States) Bryce Miller (Germany) Christopher Haase	Audi 5.2 L V10	C	56	+1 lap
11	GTD	007	(United States) TRG-AMR North America	(Australia) James Davison (United States) Al Carter	Aston Martin V12 Vantage GT3	C	56	+1 lap
11	GTD	007	(United States) TRG-AMR North America	(Australia) James Davison (United States) Al Carter	Aston Martin 6.0 L V12	C	56	+1 lap
12	GTD	22	(United States) Alex Job Racing	(United States) Cooper MacNeil (United States) Leh Keen	Porsche 911 GT America	C	56	+1 lap
12	GTD	22	(United States) Alex Job Racing	(United States) Cooper MacNeil (United States) Leh Keen	Porsche 4.0L Flat-6	C	56	+1 lap
13	GTD	94	(United States) Turner Motorsport	(United States) Dane Cameron (Finland) Markus Palttala	BMW Z4 GT3	C	56	+1 lap
13	GTD	94	(United States) Turner Motorsport	(United States) Dane Cameron (Finland) Markus Palttala	BMW 4.4 L V8	C	56	+1 lap
14	GTD	18	(Belgium) Mühlner Motorsports America	(Germany) Sebastian Asch (United States) Tomy Drissi	Porsche 911 GT America	C	56	+1 lap
14	GTD	18	(Belgium) Mühlner Motorsports America	(Germany) Sebastian Asch (United States) Tomy Drissi	Porsche 4.0L Flat-6	C	56	+1 lap
15	GTD	555	(Canada) AIM Autosport	(United States) Bill Sweedler (United States) Townsend Bell	Ferrari 458 Italia GT3	C	56	+1 lap
15	GTD	555	(Canada) AIM Autosport	(United States) Bill Sweedler (United States) Townsend Bell	Ferrari 4.5L V8	C	56	+1 lap
16	GTD	58	(United States) Snow Racing	(Belgium) Jan Heylen (United States) Madison Snow	Porsche 911 GT America	C	55	+2 Laps
16	GTD	58	(United States) Snow Racing	(Belgium) Jan Heylen (United States) Madison Snow	Porsche 4.0L Flat-6	C	55	+2 Laps
17	GTD	81	(United States) GB Autosport	(United Kingdom) Ben Barker (Republic of Ireland) Damien Faulkner	Porsche 911 GT America	C	55	+2 Laps
17	GTD	81	(United States) GB Autosport	(United Kingdom) Ben Barker (Republic of Ireland) Damien Faulkner	Porsche 4.0L Flat-6	C	55	+2 Laps
18	GTD	33	(United States) Riley Motorsports	(Netherlands) Jeroen Bleekemolen (United States) Ben Keating	SRT Viper GT3-R	C	55	+2 Laps
18	GTD	33	(United States) Riley Motorsports	(Netherlands) Jeroen Bleekemolen (United States) Ben Keating	SRT 8.0 L V10	C	55	+2 Laps
19	P	07	(United States) Speedsource	(United States) Tristan Nunez (United States) Joel Miller	Mazda Prototype	C	55	+2 Laps
19	P	07	(United States) Speedsource	(United States) Tristan Nunez (United States) Joel Miller	Mazda Skyactiv-D 2.2 L Turbo I4 (Diesel)	C	55	+2 Laps
20	GTD	35	(United States) Flying Lizard Motorsports	(United States) Seth Neiman (United States) Dion von Moltke	Audi R8 LMS ultra	C	55	+2 Laps
20	GTD	35	(United States) Flying Lizard Motorsports	(United States) Seth Neiman (United States) Dion von Moltke	Audi 5.2 L V10	C	55	+2 Laps
21	GTD	44	(United States) Magnus Racing	(United States) Andy Lally (United States) John Potter	Porsche 911 GT America	C	55	+2 Laps
21	GTD	44	(United States) Magnus Racing	(United States) Andy Lally (United States) John Potter	Porsche 4.0L Flat-6	C	55	+2 Laps
22	P	70	(United States) Speedsource	(Canada) Sylvain Tremblay (United States) Tom Long	Mazda Prototype	C	54	+3 Laps
22	P	70	(United States) Speedsource	(Canada) Sylvain Tremblay (United States) Tom Long	Mazda Skyactiv-D 2.2 L Turbo I4 (Diesel)	C	54	+3 Laps
23 DNF	GTD	45	(United States) Flying Lizard Motorsports	(United States) Spencer Pumpelly (Venezuela) Nelson Canache Jr.	Audi R8 LMS ultra	C	53	Did Not Finish
23 DNF	GTD	45	(United States) Flying Lizard Motorsports	(United States) Spencer Pumpelly (Venezuela) Nelson Canache Jr.	Audi 5.2 L V10	C	53	Did Not Finish
24	GTD	46	(United States) Fall-Line Motorsports	(United States) Charles Espenlaub (United States) Charlie Putnam	Audi R8 LMS ultra	C	53	+4 Laps
24	GTD	46	(United States) Fall-Line Motorsports	(United States) Charles Espenlaub (United States) Charlie Putnam	Audi 5.2 L V10	C	53	+4 Laps
25	GTD	64	(United States) Scuderia Corsa	(Canada) Kyle Marcelli (Canada) Chris Cumming	Ferrari 458 Italia GT3	C	53	+4 Laps
25	GTD	64	(United States) Scuderia Corsa	(Canada) Kyle Marcelli (Canada) Chris Cumming	Ferrari 4.5L V8	C	53	+4 Laps
26	GTD	27	(United States) Dempsey Racing	(United States) Patrick Dempsey (United States) Andrew Davis	Porsche 911 GT America	C	52	+5 Laps
26	GTD	27	(United States) Dempsey Racing	(United States) Patrick Dempsey (United States) Andrew Davis	Porsche 4.0L Flat-6	C	52	+5 Laps
27 DNF	GTD	73	(United States) Park Place Motorsports	(France) Kévin Estre (United States) Patrick Lindsey	Porsche 911 GT America	C	26	Did Not Finish
27 DNF	GTD	73	(United States) Park Place Motorsports	(France) Kévin Estre (United States) Patrick Lindsey	Porsche 4.0L Flat-6	C	26	Did Not Finish
28 DNF	GTD	30	(United States) NGT Motorsport	(Poland) Kuba Giermaziak (Venezuela) Henrique Cisneros	Porsche 911 GT America	C	18	Did Not Finish
28 DNF	GTD	30	(United States) NGT Motorsport	(Poland) Kuba Giermaziak (Venezuela) Henrique Cisneros	Porsche 4.0L Flat-6	C	18	Did Not Finish
29 DNF	P	31	(United States) Marsh Racing	(United States) Eric Curran (United States) Boris Said	Chevrolet Corvette DP	C	14	Did Not Finish
29 DNF	P	31	(United States) Marsh Racing	(United States) Eric Curran (United States) Boris Said	Chevrolet LS9 5.5 L V8	C	14	Did Not Finish
30 DNF	P	01	(United States) Chip Ganassi Racing with Felix Sabates	(United States) Scott Pruett (Mexico) Memo Rojas	Riley MkXXVI	C	12	Did Not Finish
30 DNF	P	01	(United States) Chip Ganassi Racing with Felix Sabates	(United States) Scott Pruett (Mexico) Memo Rojas	Ford EcoBoost 3.5 L Turbo V6	C	12	Did Not Finish
31 DNS	GTD	19	(Belgium) Mühlner Motorsports America	(Germany) Sebastian Asch (United States) Tomy Drissi	Porsche 911 GT America	C	--	Did Not Start
31 DNS	GTD	19	(Belgium) Mühlner Motorsports America	(Germany) Sebastian Asch (United States) Tomy Drissi	Porsche 4.0L Flat-6	C	--	Did Not Start
32 DNS	GTD	71	(United States) Park Place Motorsports	(United States) Jim Norman (United States) Craig Stanton	Porsche 911 GT America	C	--	Did Not Start
32 DNS	GTD	71	(United States) Park Place Motorsports	(United States) Jim Norman (United States) Craig Stanton	Porsche 4.0L Flat-6	C	--	Did Not Start

Tyre manufacturers
Key
Symbol	Tyre manufacturer
**C**	Continental

== Standings after the race ==
Prototype Drivers' Championship standings
Pos.	+/–	Driver	Points
1	2	(United States) Jordan Taylor (United States) Ricky Taylor	160
2	1	(Portugal) João Barbosa (Brazil) Christian Fittipaldi	153 (-7)
3	1	(United States) Scott Pruett (Mexico) Memo Rojas	145 (-15)
4		(Colombia) Gustavo Yacamán	139 (-21)
5	1	(United States) Ed Brown (United States) Johannes van Overbeek	138 (-22)

PC Drivers' Championship standings
Pos.	+/–	Driver	Points
1		(United States) Colin Braun (United States) Jon Bennett	97
2		(Netherlands) Renger van der Zande	94 (-3)
3		(Mexico) Martin Fuentes	80 (-17)
4		(United States) James Gue	72 (-25)
5		(Brazil) Bruno Junqueira (United States) Duncan Ende	65 (-32)

GTLM Drivers' Championship standings
Pos.	+/–	Driver	Points
1		(United States) Bill Auberlen (United Kingdom) Andy Priaulx	123
2		(Spain) Antonio Garcia (Denmark) Jan Magnussen	118 (-5)
3		(United Kingdom) Nick Tandy (Austria) Richard Lietz	111 (-12)
4		(United Kingdom) Oliver Gavin (United States) Tommy Milner	111 (-12)
5		(Denmark) Michael Christensen (United States) Patrick Long	110 (-13)

GTD Drivers' Championship standings
Pos.	+/–	Driver	Points
1		(United States) Bill Sweedler (United States) Townsend Bell	111
2	2	(United States) Leh Keen (United States) Cooper MacNeil	110 (-1)
3	1	(United States) Andy Lally (United States) John Potter	107 (-4)
4	3	(United States) Ian James (Germany) Mario Farnbacher	107 (-4)
5	3	(United States) Bryce Miller (Germany) Christopher Haase	102 (-9)

Prototype Teams' Championship standings
Pos.	+/–	Team	Points
1	2	(United States) No. 10 Wayne Taylor Racing	160
2	1	(United States) No. 5 Action Express Racing	153 (-7)
3	1	(United States) No. 01 Chip Ganassi Racing	145 (-15)
4	1	(France) No. 42 OAK Racing	139 (-21)
5	1	(United States) No. 2 Extreme Speed Motorsports	138 (-22)

PC Teams' Championship standings
Pos.	+/–	Team	Points
1		(United States) No. 54 CORE Autosport	97
2		(United States) No. 8 Starworks Motorsport	94 (-3)
3		(United States) No. 25 8 Star Motorsports	93 (-4)
4		(United States) No. 09 RSR Racing	65 (-32)
5		(United States) No. 52 PR1/Mathiasen Motorsports	59 (-38)

GTLM Teams' Championship standings
Pos.	+/–	Team	Points
1		(United States) No. 55 BMW Team RLL	123
2		(United States) No. 3 Corvette Racing	118 (-5)
3		(United States) No. 911 Porsche North America	111 (-12)
4		(United States) No. 4 Corvette Racing	111 (-12)
5		(United States) No. 912 Porsche North America	110 (-13)

GTD Teams' Championship standings
Pos.	+/–	Team	Points
1		(Canada) No. 555 AIM Autorsport	111
2	2	(United States) No. 22 Alex Job Racing	110 (-1)
3	1	(United States) No. 44 Magnus Racing	107 (-4)
4	2	(United States) No. 23 Team Seattle/Alex Job Racing	107 (-4)
5	2	(United States) No. 48 Paul Miller Racing	102 (-9)

Prototype Manufacturers' Championship standings
Pos.	+/–	Manufacturer	Points
1		(United States) Chevrolet	164
2		(United States) Ford	158 (-6)
3		(Japan) Honda	153 (-11)
4		(Japan) Nissan	148 (-16)
5		(Japan) Mazda	132 (-32)

GTLM Manufacturers' Championship standings
Pos.	+/–	Manufacturer	Points
1		(Germany) Porsche	128
2		(Germany) BMW	126 (-2)
3		(United States) Chevrolet	124 (-4)
4		(United States) SRT	116 (-12)
5		(Italy) Ferrari	110 (-18)

GTD Manufacturers' Championship standings
Pos.	+/–	Manufacturer	Points
1		(Italy) Ferrari	130
2		(Germany) Porsche	127 (-3)
3		(Germany) Audi	124 (-6)
4		(Germany) BMW	119 (-11)
5		(United States) SRT	78 (-52)

United SportsCar Championship
Previous race: Monterey Grand Prix	2014 season	Next race: Kansas Grand Prix
