= 2018 BUBBA Burger Sports Car Grand Prix =

The layout of the Long Beach Street Circuit

The 2018 BUBBA Burger Sports Car Grand Prix was a sports car race sanctioned by the International Motor Sports Association (IMSA). It was held at Long Beach Street Circuit in Long Beach, California on 14 April 2018. The race was the third round of the 2018 WeatherTech SportsCar Championship.

The overall race was won by the #5 Action Express Racing team of João Barbosa and Filipe Albuquerque, the duo's second win of the season. In GTLM, Oliver Gavin and Tommy Milner won for Corvette Racing, their second consecutive victory at the event.

== Background ==
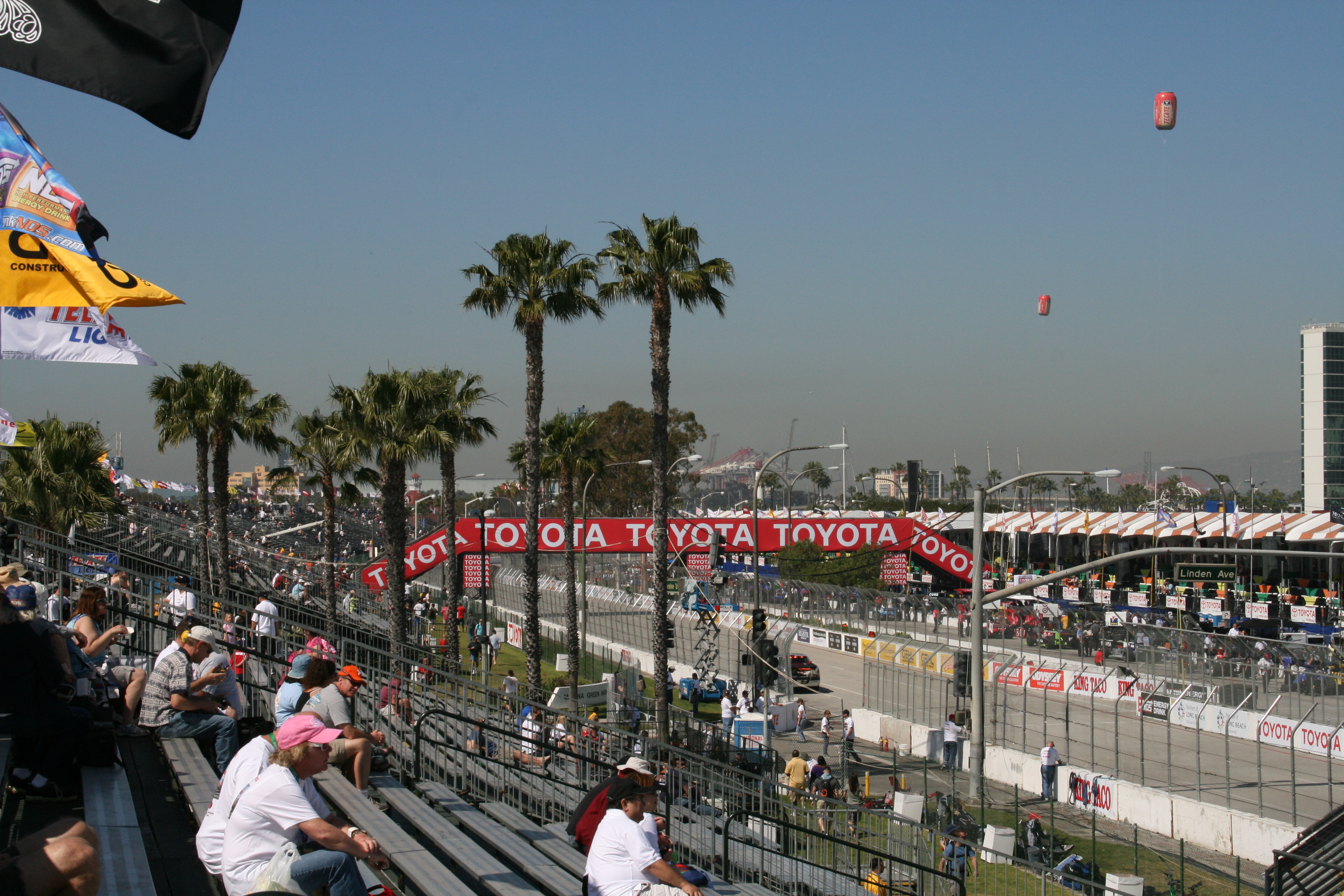
The Long Beach Street Circuit (pictured in 2009), where the race was held.

International Motor Sports Association's (IMSA) president Scott Atherton confirmed the race was part of the schedule for the 2018 IMSA SportsCar Championship (IMSA SCC) in August 2017. It was the fifth consecutive year it was part of the IMSA SCC, and the eleventh annual running of the race, counting the period between 2006 and 2013 when it was a round of the Rolex Sports Car Series and the American Le Mans Series respectively. The 2018 BUBBA Burger Sports Car Grand Prix was the third of twelve scheduled sports car races of 2018 by IMSA, the shortest of the season in terms of distance, and it was the first round not held as part of the North American Endurance Cup. The race was held at the eleven-turn 1.968 mi (3.167 km) Long Beach street circuit on April 14, 2018.

The event was run as a support race to the Grand Prix of Long Beach, the annual IndyCar Series race held at the circuit. The Pirelli World Challenge and Stadium Super Trucks also ran during the weekend. The race was also the joint-shortest of the season, at just 100 minutes, identical to the Chevrolet Detroit Grand Prix.

After the 12 hours of Sebring three weeks earlier, Eric Curran, Felipe Nasr, and Mike Conway led the Prototype Drivers' Championship with 62 points, ahead of Jon Bennett, Colin Braun, and Romain Dumas with 58 points, and Filipe Albuquerque, João Barbosa, and Christian Fittipaldi with 56 points. With 63 points, the GTLM Drivers' Championship was led by Ryan Briscoe, Scott Dixon, and Richard Westbrook with a five-point advantage over Patrick Pilet, Nick Tandy, and Frédéric Makowiecki. Cadillac and Ford were leading their respective Manufactures' Championships while Whelen Engineering Racing and Ford Chip Ganassi Racing each led their Teams' Championships.

The event was run as a support race to the Grand Prix of Long Beach, the annual IndyCar Series race held at the circuit. The Pirelli World Challenge and Stadium Super Trucks also ran during the weekend. The race was also the joint-shortest of the season, at just 100 minutes, identical to the Chevrolet Detroit Grand Prix.

=== Entries ===
A total of 22 cars took part in the event; 14 in the Prototype (P) class and 8 in the GT Le Mans (GTLM) class. The GT Daytona (GTD) class did not take part in the event, owing to a lack of garage space at the circuit. Spirit of Daytona Racing withdrew from the event following a late accident in the previous month's 12 Hours of Sebring. BAR1 Motorsports also withdrew after attending Daytona, but skipping Sebring. In GTLM, the lineup remained unchanged, apart from Risi Competizione's exit.

== Practice ==
There were two practice sessions preceding the start of the race on Saturday, one on Friday morning and one on Friday afternoon. The first session lasted two hours on Friday morning while the second session on Friday afternoon lasted 45 minutes.

=== Practice 1 ===
The first practice session took place at 7:40 AM PT on Friday and ended with Felipe Nasr topping the charts for Whelen Engineering Racing, with a lap time of 1:13.582.

| Pos. | Class | No. | Team | Driver | Time | Gap |
|---|---|---|---|---|---|---|
| 1 | P | 31 | Whelen Engineering Racing | Felipe Nasr | 1:13.582 | _ |
| 2 | P | 5 | Mustang Sampling Racing | Filipe Albuquerque | 1:13.675 | +0.093 |
| 3 | P | 7 | Acura Team Penske | Hélio Castroneves | 1:13.735 | +0.133 |

=== Final Practice ===
The second and final practice session took place at 4:45 PM PT on Friday and ended with Juan Pablo Montoya topping the charts for Acura Team Penske, with a lap time of 1:13.160.

| Pos. | Class | No. | Team | Driver | Time | Gap |
|---|---|---|---|---|---|---|
| 1 | P | 6 | Acura Team Penske | Juan Pablo Montoya | 1:13.160 | _ |
| 2 | P | 31 | Whelen Engineering Racing | Felipe Nasr | 1:13.210 | +0.050 |
| 3 | P | 7 | Acura Team Penske | Ricky Taylor | 1:13.217 | +0.057 |

== Qualifying ==
Friday afternoon's 35-minute qualifying session was divided into two groups. Both categories had 15-minute individual sessions, and regulations stipulated teams to nominate a single driver to qualify their cars. The competitors' fastest lap times determined the starting order with the grid arranged to put the Prototype cars ahead of all the GTLM entries.

=== Qualifying results ===
Pole positions in each class are indicated in bold and by ‡.

| Pos. | Class | No. | Team | Driver | Time | Gap | Grid |
|---|---|---|---|---|---|---|---|
| 1 | **P** | **6** | **(United States) Acura Team Penske** | **(Colombia) Juan Pablo Montoya** | **1:12.922** | — | 1‡ |
| 2 | P | 31 | (United States) Whelen Engineering Racing | (Brazil) Felipe Nasr | 1:13.109 | +0.187 | 2 |
| 3 | P | 55 | (Germany) Mazda Team Joest | (United Kingdom) Harry Tincknell | 1:13.156 | +0.234 | 3 |
| 4 | P | 7 | (United States) Acura Team Penske | (Brazil) Hélio Castroneves | 1:13.346 | +0.424 | 4 |
| 5 | P | 5 | (United States) Mustang Sampling Racing | (Portugal) João Barbosa | 1:13.733 | +0.811 | 5 |
| 6 | P | 10 | (United States) Wayne Taylor Racing | (Netherlands) Renger van der Zande | 1:13.880 | +0.958 | 6 |
| 7 | P | 77 | (Germany) Mazda Team Joest | (United States) Tristan Nunez | 1:13.929 | +1.007 | 7 |
| 8 | P | 2 | (United States) Tequila Patrón ESM | (United States) Scott Sharp | 1:14.177 | +1.255 | 8 |
| 9 | P | 52 | (United States) AFS/PR1 Mathiasen Motorsports | (Colombia) Gustavo Yacamán | 1:14.622 | +1.700 | 9 |
| 10 | P | 22 | (United States) Tequila Patrón ESM | (United States) Johannes van Overbeek | 1:14.821 | +1.899 | 10 |
| 11 | P | 38 | (United States) Performance Tech Motorsports | (United States) Kyle Masson | 1:15.764 | +2.842 | 11 |
| 12 | P | 99 | (United States) JDC-Miller MotorSports | (Canada) Misha Goikhberg | 1:15.807 | +2.885 | 12 |
| 13 | **GTLM** | **66** | **(United States) Ford Chip Ganassi Racing** | **(United States) Joey Hand** | **1:16.869** | **+3.947** | 15‡ |
| 14 | GTLM | 912 | (United States) Porsche GT Team | (Belgium) Laurens Vanthoor | 1:17.013 | +4.091 | 16 |
| 15 | GTLM | 911 | (United States) Porsche GT Team | (France) Patrick Pilet | 1:17.263 | +4.341 | 17 |
| 16 | GTLM | 3 | (United States) Corvette Racing | (Denmark) Jan Magnussen | 1:17.293 | +4.371 | 18 |
| 17 | GTLM | 4 | (United States) Corvette Racing | (United Kingdom) Oliver Gavin | 1:17.533 | +4.611 | 19 |
| 18 | GTLM | 67 | (United States) Ford Chip Ganassi Racing | (United Kingdom) Richard Westbrook | 1:17.549 | +4.627 | 20 |
| 19 | P | 54 | (United States) CORE Autosport | (United States) Jon Bennett | 1:17.672 | +4.750 | 13 |
| 20 | GTLM | 25 | (United States) BMW Team RLL | (United States) Connor De Phillippi | 1:18.153 | +5.231 | 21 |
| 21 | GTLM | 24 | (United States) BMW Team RLL | (Finland) Jesse Krohn | 1:18.224 | +5.302 | 22 |
| 22 | P | 85 | (United States) JDC-Miller MotorSports | Did Not Participate | | | 14 |

== Race ==
=== Post-race ===
As a result of winning the race, Albuquerque and Barbosa took the lead of the Prototype Drivers' Championship. Jordan Taylor and Renger van der Zande advanced from seventh to fourth. Goikhberg and Simpson moved to fifth after being eighth coming into Long Beach. The result kept Briscoe and Westbrook atop the GTLM Drivers' Championship with 95 points. By winning the race, Gavin and Milner advanced from seventh to second while Pilet and Tandy dropped from second to fourth. Cadillac and Ford continued to top their respective Manufacturers' Championships while Ford Chip Ganassi Racing kept their respective advantage in the GTLM Teams' Championship. Mustang Sampling Racing took the lead of the Prototype Teams' Championship with nine rounds left in the season.

== Results ==
Class winners are denoted in bold and ‡.

Final race classification
| Pos | Class | No. | Team | Drivers | Chassis | Tire | Laps | Time/Retired |
| Pos | Class | No. | Team | Drivers | Engine | Tire | Laps | Time/Retired |
|---|---|---|---|---|---|---|---|---|
| 1 | **P** | **5** | **(United States) Mustang Sampling Racing** | **(Portugal) Filipe Albuquerque (Portugal) João Barbosa** | **Cadillac DPi-V.R** | C | **70** | **1:41:03.988‡** |
| 1 | **P** | **5** | **(United States) Mustang Sampling Racing** | **(Portugal) Filipe Albuquerque (Portugal) João Barbosa** | **Cadillac 5.5 L V8** | C | **70** | **1:41:03.988‡** |
| 2 | P | 2 | (United States) Tequila Patrón ESM | (United Kingdom) Ryan Dalziel (United States) Scott Sharp | Ligier Nissan DPi | C | 70 | +4.766 |
| 2 | P | 2 | (United States) Tequila Patrón ESM | (United Kingdom) Ryan Dalziel (United States) Scott Sharp | Nissan VR38DETT 3.8 L Turbo V6 | C | 70 | +4.766 |
| 3 | P | 10 | (United States) Wayne Taylor Racing | (United States) Jordan Taylor (Netherlands) Renger van der Zande | Cadillac DPi-V.R | C | 70 | +5.249 |
| 3 | P | 10 | (United States) Wayne Taylor Racing | (United States) Jordan Taylor (Netherlands) Renger van der Zande | Cadillac 5.5 L V8 | C | 70 | +5.249 |
| 4 | P | 77 | (Germany) Mazda Team Joest | (United Kingdom) Oliver Jarvis (United States) Tristan Nunez | Mazda RT24-P | C | 70 | +6.748 |
| 4 | P | 77 | (Germany) Mazda Team Joest | (United Kingdom) Oliver Jarvis (United States) Tristan Nunez | Mazda MZ-2.0T 2.0 L Turbo I4 | C | 70 | +6.748 |
| 5 | P | 6 | (United States) Acura Team Penske | (United States) Dane Cameron (Colombia) Juan Pablo Montoya | Acura ARX-05 | C | 70 | +10.537 |
| 5 | P | 6 | (United States) Acura Team Penske | (United States) Dane Cameron (Colombia) Juan Pablo Montoya | Acura AR35TT 3.5 L Turbo V6 | C | 70 | +10.537 |
| 6 | P | 7 | (United States) Acura Team Penske | (Brazil) Hélio Castroneves (United States) Ricky Taylor | Acura ARX-05 | C | 70 | +15.532 |
| 6 | P | 7 | (United States) Acura Team Penske | (Brazil) Hélio Castroneves (United States) Ricky Taylor | Acura AR35TT 3.5 L Turbo V6 | C | 70 | +15.532 |
| 7 | P | 31 | (United States) Whelen Engineering Racing | (United States) Eric Curran (Brazil) Felipe Nasr | Cadillac DPi-V.R | C | 70 | +16.340 |
| 7 | P | 31 | (United States) Whelen Engineering Racing | (United States) Eric Curran (Brazil) Felipe Nasr | Cadillac 5.5 L V8 | C | 70 | +16.340 |
| 8 | P | 99 | (United States) JDC-Miller MotorSports | (Canada) Misha Goikhberg (South Africa) Stephen Simpson | Oreca 07 | C | 70 | +19.686 |
| 8 | P | 99 | (United States) JDC-Miller MotorSports | (Canada) Misha Goikhberg (South Africa) Stephen Simpson | Gibson GK428 4.2 L V8 | C | 70 | +19.686 |
| 9 | P | 55 | (Germany) Mazda Team Joest | (United States) Jonathan Bomarito (United Kingdom) Harry Tincknell | Mazda RT24-P | C | 70 | +19.986 |
| 9 | P | 55 | (Germany) Mazda Team Joest | (United States) Jonathan Bomarito (United Kingdom) Harry Tincknell | Mazda MZ-2.0T 2.0 L Turbo I4 | C | 70 | +19.986 |
| 10 | P | 54 | (United States) CORE Autosport | (United States) Jon Bennett (United States) Colin Braun | Oreca 07 | C | 70 | +1:09.441 |
| 10 | P | 54 | (United States) CORE Autosport | (United States) Jon Bennett (United States) Colin Braun | Gibson GK428 4.2 L V8 | C | 70 | +1:09.441 |
| 11 | **GTLM** | **4** | **(United States) Corvette Racing** | **(United Kingdom) Oliver Gavin (United States) Tommy Milner** | **Chevrolet Corvette C7.R** | M | **69** | **+1 Lap‡** |
| 11 | **GTLM** | **4** | **(United States) Corvette Racing** | **(United Kingdom) Oliver Gavin (United States) Tommy Milner** | **Chevrolet 5.5 L V8** | M | **69** | **+1 Lap‡** |
| 12 | GTLM | 67 | (United States) Ford Chip Ganassi Racing | (Australia) Ryan Briscoe (United Kingdom) Richard Westbrook | Ford GT | M | 69 | +1 Lap |
| 12 | GTLM | 67 | (United States) Ford Chip Ganassi Racing | (Australia) Ryan Briscoe (United Kingdom) Richard Westbrook | Ford EcoBoost 3.5 L Turbo V6 | M | 69 | +1 Lap |
| 13 | GTLM | 66 | (United States) Ford Chip Ganassi Racing | (United States) Joey Hand (Germany) Dirk Müller | Ford GT | M | 69 | +1 Lap |
| 13 | GTLM | 66 | (United States) Ford Chip Ganassi Racing | (United States) Joey Hand (Germany) Dirk Müller | Ford EcoBoost 3.5 L Turbo V6 | M | 69 | +1 Lap |
| 14 | GTLM | 3 | (United States) Corvette Racing | (Spain) Antonio García (Denmark) Jan Magnussen | Chevrolet Corvette C7.R | M | 69 | +1 Lap |
| 14 | GTLM | 3 | (United States) Corvette Racing | (Spain) Antonio García (Denmark) Jan Magnussen | Chevrolet 5.5 L V8 | M | 69 | +1 Lap |
| 15 | GTLM | 24 | (United States) BMW Team RLL | (United States) John Edwards (Finland) Jesse Krohn | BMW M8 GTE | M | 69 | +1 Lap |
| 15 | GTLM | 24 | (United States) BMW Team RLL | (United States) John Edwards (Finland) Jesse Krohn | BMW S63 4.0 L Twin-turbo V8 | M | 69 | +1 Lap |
| 16 | GTLM | 911 | (United States) Porsche GT Team | (France) Patrick Pilet (United Kingdom) Nick Tandy | Porsche 911 RSR | M | 69 | +1 Lap |
| 16 | GTLM | 911 | (United States) Porsche GT Team | (France) Patrick Pilet (United Kingdom) Nick Tandy | Porsche 4.0 L Flat-6 | M | 69 | +1 Lap |
| 17 | P | 52 | (United States) AFS / PR1 Mathiasen Motorsports | (Colombia) Sebastián Saavedra (Colombia) Gustavo Yacamán | Ligier JS P217 | C | 68 | +2 Laps |
| 17 | P | 52 | (United States) AFS / PR1 Mathiasen Motorsports | (Colombia) Sebastián Saavedra (Colombia) Gustavo Yacamán | Gibson GK428 4.2 L V8 | C | 68 | +2 Laps |
| 18 DNF | GTLM | 912 | (United States) Porsche GT Team | (New Zealand) Earl Bamber (Belgium) Laurens Vanthoor | Porsche 911 RSR | M | 52 | Suspension |
| 18 DNF | GTLM | 912 | (United States) Porsche GT Team | (New Zealand) Earl Bamber (Belgium) Laurens Vanthoor | Porsche 4.0 L Flat-6 | M | 52 | Suspension |
| 19 DNF | GTLM | 25 | (United States) BMW Team RLL | (United States) Connor De Phillippi (United Kingdom) Alexander Sims | BMW M8 GTE | M | 37 | Did Not Finish |
| 19 DNF | GTLM | 25 | (United States) BMW Team RLL | (United States) Connor De Phillippi (United Kingdom) Alexander Sims | BMW S63 4.0 L Twin-turbo V8 | M | 37 | Did Not Finish |
| 20 DNF | P | 22 | (United States) Tequila Patrón ESM | (Brazil) Pipo Derani (Netherlands) Johannes van Overbeek | Ligier Nissan DPi | C | 32 | Transmission |
| 20 DNF | P | 22 | (United States) Tequila Patrón ESM | (Brazil) Pipo Derani (Netherlands) Johannes van Overbeek | Nissan VR38DETT 3.8 L Turbo V6 | C | 32 | Transmission |
| 21 DNF | P | 85 | (United States) JDC-Miller MotorSports | (United States) Robert Alon (Switzerland) Simon Trummer | Oreca 07 | C | 20 | Did Not Finish |
| 21 DNF | P | 85 | (United States) JDC-Miller MotorSports | (United States) Robert Alon (Switzerland) Simon Trummer | Gibson GK428 4.2 L V8 | C | 20 | Did Not Finish |
| 22 DNF | P | 38 | (United States) Performance Tech Motorsports | (United States) James French (United States) Kyle Masson | Oreca 07 | C | 0 | Crash |
| 22 DNF | P | 38 | (United States) Performance Tech Motorsports | (United States) James French (United States) Kyle Masson | Gibson GK428 4.2 L V8 | C | 0 | Crash |

Tyre manufacturers
Key
| Symbol | Tyre manufacturer |
|---|---|
| **C** | Continental |
| **M** | Michelin |

== Standings after the race ==
Prototype Drivers' Championship standings
| Pos. | +/– | Driver | Points |
|---|---|---|---|
| 1 | 2 | (Portugal) Filipe Albuquerque (Portugal) João Barbosa | 91 |
| 2 | 1 | (United States) Eric Curran (Brazil) Felipe Nasr | 86 |
| 3 | 1 | (United States) Jon Bennett (United States) Colin Braun | 79 |
| 4 | 3 | (United States) Jordan Taylor (Netherlands) Renger van der Zande | 78 |
| 5 | 3 | (Canada) Misha Goikhberg (South Africa) Stephen Simpson | 71 |

GTLM Drivers' Championship standings
| Pos. | +/– | Driver | Points |
|---|---|---|---|
| 1 | | (Australia) Ryan Briscoe (United Kingdom) Richard Westbrook | 95 |
| 2 | 5 | (United Kingdom) Oliver Gavin (United States) Tommy Milner | 88 |
| 3 | 1 | (United States) Joey Hand (Germany) Dirk Müller | 84 |
| 4 | 2 | (France) Patrick Pilet (United Kingdom) Nick Tandy | 83 |
| 5 | 1 | (Spain) Antonio García (Denmark) Jan Magnussen | 81 |

GTD Drivers' Championship standings
| Pos. | +/– | Driver | Points |
|---|---|---|---|
| 1 | | (United States) Bryan Sellers (United States) Madison Snow | 65 |
| 2 | | (Netherlands) Jeroen Bleekemolen (United States) Ben Keating (Germany) Luca Stolz | 58 |
| 3 | | (United Kingdom) Katherine Legge (Portugal) Álvaro Parente (United States) Trent Hindman | 55 |
| 4 | | (United States) Cooper MacNeil (United States) Gunnar Jeannette (Italy) Alessandro Balzan | 53 |
| 5 | | (South Africa) Sheldon van der Linde (Germany) Christopher Mies | 52 |

- Note: Only the top five positions are included for all sets of standings.

Prototype Teams' Championship standings
| Pos. | +/– | Team | Points |
|---|---|---|---|
| 1 | 2 | (United States) No. 5 Mustang Sampling Racing | 91 |
| 2 | 1 | (United States) No. 31 Whelen Engineering Racing | 86 |
| 3 | 2 | (United States) No. 54 CORE Autosport | 79 |
| 4 | 2 | (United States) No. 10 Wayne Taylor Racing | 78 |
| 5 | 2 | (United States) No. 99 JDC-Miller Motorsports | 71 |

GTLM Teams' Championship standings
| Pos. | +/– | Team | Points |
|---|---|---|---|
| 1 | | (United States) No. 67 Ford Chip Ganassi Racing | 95 |
| 2 | 5 | (United States) No. 4 Corvette Racing | 88 |
| 3 | 1 | (United States) No. 66 Ford Chip Ganassi Racing | 84 |
| 4 | 2 | (United States) No. 911 Porsche GT Team | 83 |
| 5 | 1 | (United States) No. 3 Corvette Racing | 81 |

GTD Teams' Championship standings
| Pos. | +/– | Team | Points |
|---|---|---|---|
| 1 | | (United States) No. 48 Paul Miller Racing | 65 |
| 2 | | (United States) No. 33 Mercedes-AMG Team Riley Motorsports | 58 |
| 3 | | (United States) No. 86 Michael Shank Racing with Curb-Agajanian | 55 |
| 4 | | (United States) No. 63 Scuderia Corsa | 53 |
| 5 | | (Germany) No. 29 Montaplast by Land-Motorsport | 52 |

- Note: Only the top five positions are included for all sets of standings.

Prototype Manufacturers' Championship standings
| Pos. | +/– | Manufacturer | Points |
|---|---|---|---|
| 1 | | (United States) Cadillac | 102 |
| 2 | | (Japan) Nissan | 95 |
| 3 | 1 | (Japan) Mazda | 90 |
| 4 | 1 | (United States) Acura | 88 |

GTLM Manufacturers' Championship standings
| Pos. | +/– | Manufacturer | Points |
|---|---|---|---|
| 1 | | (United States) Ford | 97 |
| 2 | 1 | (United States) Chevrolet | 93 |
| 3 | 1 | (Germany) Porsche | 91 |
| 4 | | (Germany) BMW | 88 |
| 5 | | (Italy) Ferrari | 58 |

GTD Manufacturers' Championship standings
| Pos. | +/– | Manufacturer | Points |
|---|---|---|---|
| 1 | | (Italy) Lamborghini | 70 |
| 2 | | (Italy) Ferrari | 60 |
| 3 | | (Germany) Mercedes-AMG | 60 |
| 4 | | (United States) Acura | 56 |
| 5 | | (Germany) Audi | 54 |

- Note: Only the top five positions are included for all sets of standings.

IMSA SportsCar Championship
| Previous race: 12 Hours of Sebring | 2018 season | Next race: Sports Car Challenge of Mid-Ohio |
