= 2017 Chevrolet Sports Car Classic =

Sports car race

The layout of The Raceway on Belle Isle

The 2017 Chevrolet Sports Car Classic was a sports car race sanctioned by the International Motor Sports Association (IMSA). The race was held at The Raceway on Belle Isle in Detroit, Michigan on June 3, 2017. The race was the fifth round of the 2017 IMSA SportsCar Championship.

== Background ==
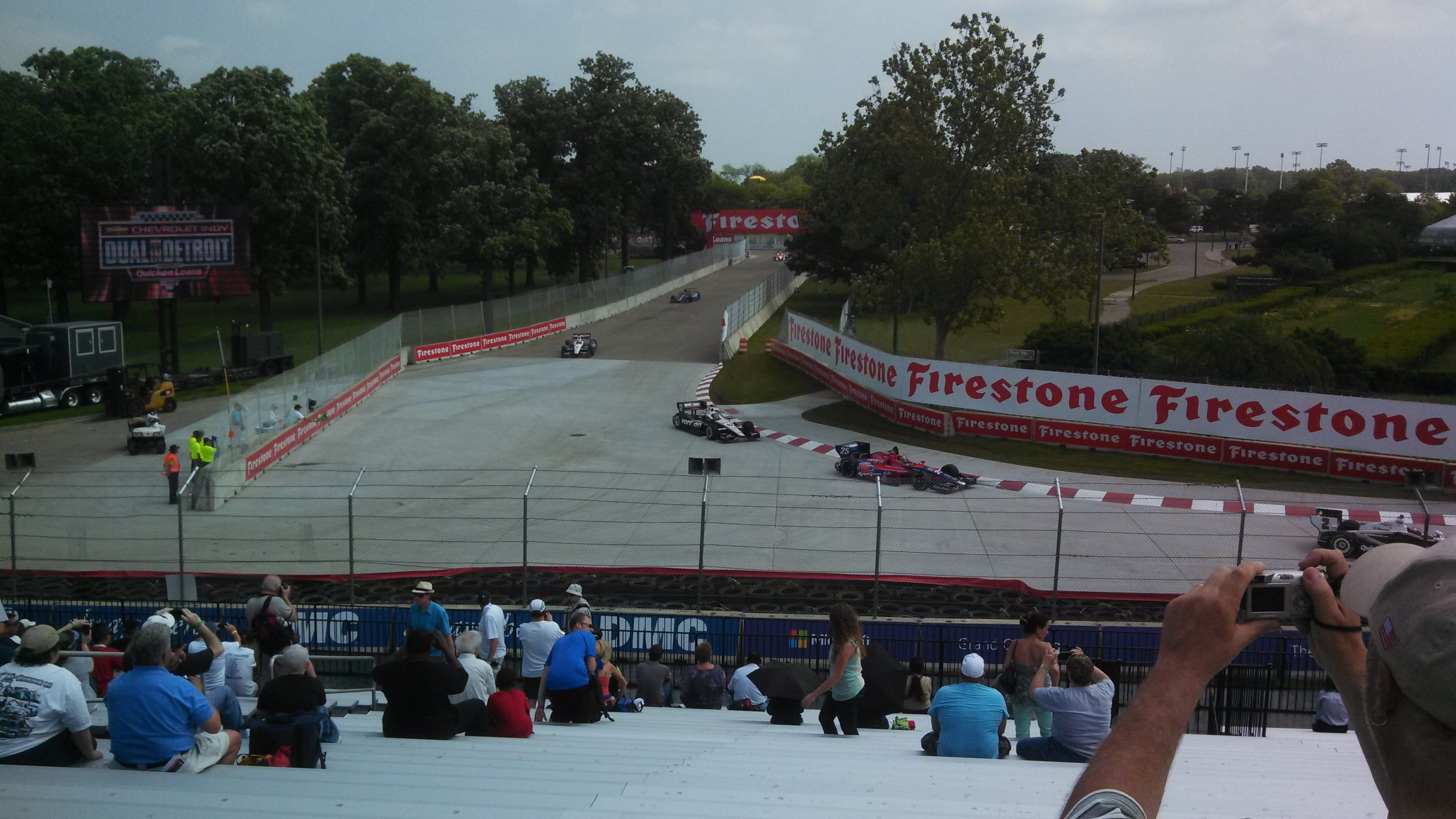
The Raceway on Belle Isle, where the race was held.

Similar to the Grand Prix of Long Beach, this event was held in conjunction with the Detroit Grand Prix in the IndyCar series, with one event held on the same day as the IMSA event, and another held a day after as a double-header.

IMSA's president Scott Atherton confirmed the Chevrolet Sports Car Classic was part of the series' schedule for the 2017 IMSA SportsCar Championship at Road America's victory lane in August 2016. It was the fourth consecutive year the event was held as part of the WeatherTech SportsCar Championship, and the eighth annual running of the race, counting the period between 2007 and 2013 when it was a round of the Rolex Sports Car Series and the American Le Mans Series respectively. The 2017 Chevrolet Sports Car Classic was the fifth of twelve scheduled sports car races of 2017 by IMSA, the shortest in terms of time, and was the third round not held on the held as part of the North American Endurance Cup. The race was held at the fourteen-turn 2.350 mi (3.782 km) Belle Isle Park on June 3, 2017. After the Advance Auto Parts Sportscar Showdown four weeks earlier, Jordan Taylor and Ricky Taylor led the Prototype Drivers' Championship with 141 points, ahead of João Barbosa and Christian Fittipaldi with 119 points, and Dane Cameron and Eric Curran with 111 points. With 108 points, PC was led by James French and Patricio O'Ward with a twenty-point advantage over Don Yount and Buddy Rice. In GTD, the Drivers' Championship was led by Ben Keating and Jeroen Bleekemolen with 133 points, ahead of Alessandro Balzan and Christina Nielsen with 109 points. Cadillac and Mercedes-AMG were leading their respective Manufacturers' Championships, while Wayne Taylor Racing, Performance Tech Motorsports, and Riley Motorsports Team AMG each led their own Teams' Championships.

On May 25, 2017, IMSA released the latest technical bulletin outlining Balance of Performance for the event. In P, the Cadillac DPi-V.R received a 0.6 mm smaller air restrictor as well as a fuel capacity reduction of 2 liters and changes to the cars rear wing angle. The Mazda RT24-P received a fuel capacity increase of 1 liter and an increase in turbo boost. The Nissan Onroak DPi received a 0.5 mm reduction of refueling restriction and gained 1 liter of fuel capacity. In GTD, Mercedes-AMG GT3 received a 20 kilogram weight increase and an air restrictor reduction of 0.5 millimeters. The Porsche 911 GT3 R received a 10 kilogram weight increase. The Lamborghini Huracán GT3 and Audi R8 LMS were given fuel capacity increases of 2 and 1 liters, respectively.

== Entries ==
With the absence of the GTLM class from the field, only three racing classes were represented in Belle Isle. A total of 28 cars took part in the event split across 3 classes. 10 cars were entered in P, 3 in PC, and 15 in GTD. In P, Kenton Koch and Ryan Lewis shared the PR1/Mathiasen Motorsports entry. In PC, Ryan Lewis joined Don Yount in the No. 20 BAR1 Motorsports entry. Tomy Drissi joined Bruno Junqueira in the No. 26 BAR1 Motorsports entry. In GTD, Lone Star Racing and TRG skipped the event.

== Practice ==
There were two practice sessions preceding the start of the race on Saturday, two on Friday. The first ninety-minute session was on Friday morning. The second on Friday afternoon lasted 90 minutes.

=== Practice 1 ===
The first practice session took place at 8:30 am ET on Friday and ended with Christian Fittipaldi topping the charts for Mustang Sampling Racing, with a lap time of 1:23.750. The PC class was topped by the #38 Performance Tech Motorsports Oreca FLM09 of Patricio O'Ward with a time of 1:27.851. Jeroen Mul set the fastest time in GTD.

Pos.	Class	No.	Team	Driver	Time	Gap
1	P	5	Mustang Sampling Racing	Christian Fittipaldi	1:23.750	_
2	P	10	Wayne Taylor Racing	Jordan Taylor	1:24.230	+0.480
3	P	85	JDC-Miller MotorSports	Misha Goikhberg	1:24.808	+0.578

=== Practice 2 ===
The second and final practice session took place at 1:00 pm ET on Friday and ended with Dane Cameron topping the charts for Whelen Engineering Racing, with a lap time of 1:23.058. Patricio O'Ward set the fastest time in PC. Lawson Aschenbach was fastest in GTD.

Pos.	Class	No.	Team	Driver	Time	Gap
1	P	31	Whelen Engineering Racing	Dane Cameron	1:23.058	_
2	P	5	Mustang Sampling Racing	Christian Fittipaldi	1:23.224	+0.166
3	P	10	Wayne Taylor Racing	Ricky Taylor	1:23.405	+0.347

== Qualifying ==
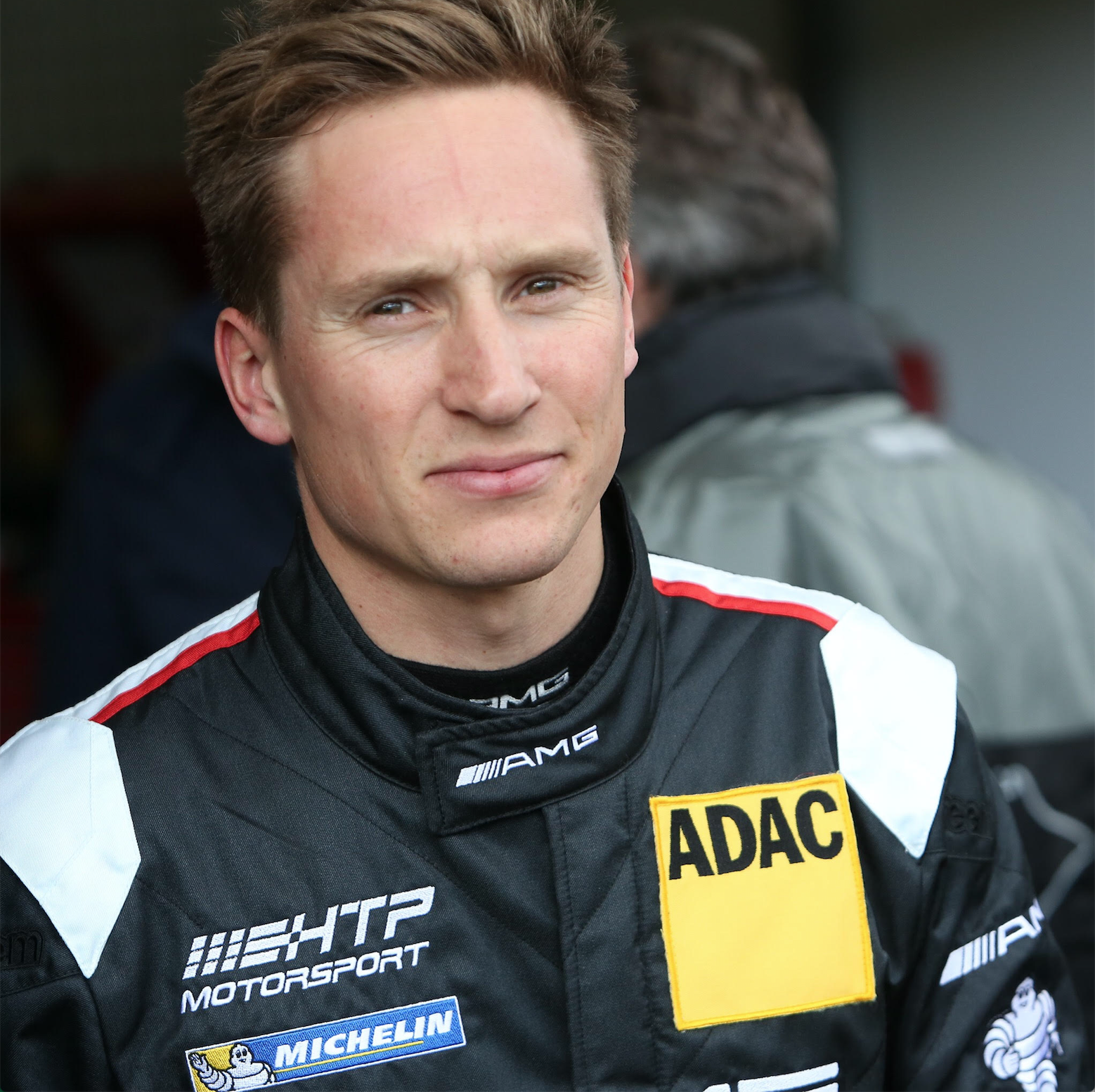
Renger van der Zande (pictured in 2016) set the fastest overall lap time in qualifying.

Friday afternoon's 65-minute three-group qualifying, each category had separate 15-minute sessions. Regulations stipulated that teams nominate one qualifying driver, with the fastest laps determining each class' starting order. IMSA then arranged the grid to put Prototypes ahead of the PC and GTD cars.

The first was for cars in GTD class. Lawson Aschenbach qualified on pole for the class driving the No. 57 Stevenson Motorsports entry, besting Katherine Legge in the No. 93 Michael Shank Racing with Curb-Agajanian entry.

The second session of qualifying was for cars in the PC class. James French set the fastest time driving the No. 38 Performance Tech Motorsports entry.

The final session of qualifying was for the P class. Renger van der Zande's No. 30 Riley was fastest overall, lapping at 1 minute, 24.693 seconds. Jonathan Bomarito set the second fastest time before Ricky Taylor, driving the No. 10 Cadillac, crashed at turn four. The red flag was thrown and caused the session to be abandoned. Christian Fittipaldi was handed pole position as the session did not reach minimum time to be declared official and Starting positions were set by Teams' Championship standings. For causing the red flag, Taylor had his time from the session deleted.

=== Qualifying results ===
Pole positions in each class are indicated in bold and by ‡.

Pos.	Class	No.	Team	Driver	Time	Gap	Grid
1	P	90	(United States) VisitFlorida Racing	(Netherlands) Renger van der Zande	1:24.693	_	9^{1}
2	P	55	(Japan) Mazda Motorsports	(United States) Jonathan Bomarito	1:25.055	+0.362	5
3	P	85	(United States) JDC-Miller MotorSports	(Canada) Mikhail Goikhberg	1:25.510	+0.817	3
4	P	70	(Japan) Mazda Motorsports	(United States) Tom Long	1:25.875	+1.182	7
5	**P**	**5**	**(United States) Mustang Sampling Racing**	**(Brazil) Christian Fittipaldi**	**1:25.931**	**+1.238**	1‡
6	P	31	(United States) Whelen Engineering Racing	(United States) Eric Curran	1:26.048	+1.355	2
7	P	2	(United States) Tequila Patrón ESM	(United States) Scott Sharp	1:26.092	+1.399	4
8	P	10	(United States) Wayne Taylor Racing	(United States) Ricky Taylor	1:26.736	+2.043	12^{2}
9	**PC**	**38**	**(United States) Performance Tech Motorsports**	**(United States) James French**	**1:28.494**	**+3.801**	10‡
10	P	22	(United States) Tequila Patrón ESM	(United States) Ed Brown	1:28.621	+3.928	6
11	**GTD**	**57**	**(United States) Stevenson Motorsports**	**(United States) Lawson Aschenbach**	**1:30.200**	**+5.507**	14‡
12	GTD	93	(United States) Michael Shank Racing with Curb-Agajanian	(United Kingdom) Katherine Legge	1:30.541	+5.848	15
13	GTD	48	(United States) Paul Miller Racing	(United States) Bryan Sellers	1:30.763	+6.070	16
14	GTD	16	(United States) Change Racing	(United States) Corey Lewis	1:30.802	+6.109	17
15	GTD	14	(United States) 3GT Racing	(United States) Scott Pruett	1:30.878	+6.185	18
16	GTD	28	(United States) Alegra Motorsports	(Canada) Daniel Morad	1:30.944	+6.251	19
17	GTD	63	(United States) Scuderia Corsa	(Denmark) Christina Nielsen	1:31.016	+6.323	20
18	GTD	33	(United States) Riley Motorsports – Team AMG	(United States) Ben Keating	1:31.511	+6.818	21
19	GTD	15	(United States) 3GT Racing	(United States) Robert Alon	1:31.557	+6.864	21
20	GTD	75	(Australia) SunEnergy1 Racing	(Australia) Kenny Habul	1:31.759	+7.066	22
21	GTD	50	(United States) Riley Motorsports – WeatherTech Racing	(United States) Cooper MacNeil	1:31.856	+7.163	23
22	GTD	96	(United States) Turner Motorsport	(United States) Bret Curtis	1:32.459	+7.766	24
23	GTD	54	(United States) CORE Autosport	(United States) Jon Bennett	1:33.097	+8.404	25
24	PC	26	(United States) BAR1 Motorsports	(United States) Tomy Drissi	1:33.166	+8.473	12^{3}
25	PC	20	(United States) BAR1 Motorsports	(United States) Don Yount	1:34.968	+10.275	11
26	P	52	(United States) PR1/Mathiasen Motorsports	No Time Established			8^{4}
27	GTD	73	(United States) Park Place Motorsports	No Time Established			27^{5}
28	GTD	86	(United States) Michael Shank Racing with Curb-Agajanian	No Time Established			28^{6}
Sources:

- ^{1} The No. 90 VisitFlorida Racing entry was moved to the back of the P field as per Article 43.6 of the Sporting regulations (Change of starting tires).
- ^{2} The No. 10 Wayne Taylor Racing entry had its fastest lap deleted as penalty for causing a red flag during its qualifying session.
- ^{3} The No. 26 BAR1 Motorsports entry was moved to the back of the PC field after failing post qualifying technical inspection.
- ^{4} The No. 52 PR1/Mathiasen Motorsports entry moved to the back of the P field as per Article 40.2.10 of the Sporting regulations (car did not participate in qualifying and no starting driver was nominated).
- ^{5} The No. 73 Park Place Motorsports entry was moved to the back of the GTD field as per Article 43.6 of the Sporting regulations (Change of starting tires).
- ^{6} The No. 86 Michael Shank Racing with Curb-Agajanian entry was moved to the back of the GTD field as per Articles 43.5 and 43.6 of the Sporting regulations (Change of starting driver) and (Change of starting tires).

== Race ==
=== Post-race ===
With a total of 177 points, Jordan Taylor and Ricky Taylor's victory allowed him to increase their advantage over Fittipaldi and Barbosa in the Prototype Drivers' Championship to 30 points. With a total of 144 points, French and O'Ward's victory allowed him to increase their advantage over Yount in the PC Drivers' Championship to 26 points. The result kept Bleekemolen and Keating atop the GTD Drivers' Championship while Negri Jr. and Segal advanced from seventh to fifth. Cadillac and Mercedes-AMG continued to top their respective Manufacturers' Championships, while Wayne Taylor Racing, Performance Tech Motorsports, and Riley Motorsports kept their respective advantages in the trio of Teams' Championships with seven races left in the season.

=== Results ===
Class winners are denoted in bold and ‡.

Final race classification
Pos	Class	No.	Team	Drivers	Chassis	Tire	Laps	Time/Retired
Pos	Class	No.	Team	Drivers	Engine	Tire	Laps	Time/Retired
1	**P**	**10**	**(United States) Wayne Taylor Racing**	**(United States) Ricky Taylor (United States) Jordan Taylor**	**Cadillac DPi-V.R**	C	**65**	**1:40:49.514‡**
1	**P**	**10**	**(United States) Wayne Taylor Racing**	**(United States) Ricky Taylor (United States) Jordan Taylor**	**Cadillac 6.2 L V8**	C	**65**	**1:40:49.514‡**
2	P	31	(United States) Whelen Engineering Racing	(United States) Dane Cameron (United States) Eric Curran	Cadillac DPi-V.R	C	65	+4.948
2	P	31	(United States) Whelen Engineering Racing	(United States) Dane Cameron (United States) Eric Curran	Cadillac 6.2 L V8	C	65	+4.948
3	P	70	(Japan) Mazda Motorsports	(United States) Tom Long (United States) Joel Miller	Mazda RT24-P	C	65	+34.502
3	P	70	(Japan) Mazda Motorsports	(United States) Tom Long (United States) Joel Miller	Mazda MZ-2.0T 2.0 L Turbo I4	C	65	+34.502
4	P	5	(United States) Mustang Sampling Racing	(Portugal) João Barbosa (Brazil) Christian Fittipaldi	Cadillac DPi-V.R	C	65	+40.007
4	P	5	(United States) Mustang Sampling Racing	(Portugal) João Barbosa (Brazil) Christian Fittipaldi	Cadillac 6.2 L V8	C	65	+40.007
5	P	55	(Japan) Mazda Motorsports	(United States) Tristan Nunez (United States) Jonathan Bomarito	Mazda RT24-P	C	65	+41.888
5	P	55	(Japan) Mazda Motorsports	(United States) Tristan Nunez (United States) Jonathan Bomarito	Mazda MZ-2.0T 2.0 L Turbo I4	C	65	+41.888
6	P	85	(United States) JDC-Miller MotorSports	(Canada) Mikhail Goikhberg (South Africa) Stephen Simpson	Oreca 07	C	65	+1:07.765
6	P	85	(United States) JDC-Miller MotorSports	(Canada) Mikhail Goikhberg (South Africa) Stephen Simpson	Gibson GK428 4.2 L V8	C	65	+1:07.765
7	P	22	(United States) Tequila Patrón ESM	(United States) Johannes van Overbeek (United States) Ed Brown	Nissan Onroak DPi	C	65	+1:19.995
7	P	22	(United States) Tequila Patrón ESM	(United States) Johannes van Overbeek (United States) Ed Brown	Nissan VR38DETT 3.8 L Turbo V6	C	65	+1:19.995
8	**PC**	**38**	**(United States) Performance Tech Motorsports**	**(United States) James French** **(Mexico) Patricio O'Ward**	**Oreca FLM09**	C	**64**	**+1 lap‡**
8	**PC**	**38**	**(United States) Performance Tech Motorsports**	**(United States) James French** **(Mexico) Patricio O'Ward**	**Chevrolet 6.2 L V8**	C	**64**	**+1 lap‡**
9	PC	26	(United States) BAR1 Motorsports	(United States) Tomy Drissi (Brazil) Bruno Junqueira	Oreca FLM09	C	63	+2 Laps
9	PC	26	(United States) BAR1 Motorsports	(United States) Tomy Drissi (Brazil) Bruno Junqueira	Chevrolet 6.2 L V8	C	63	+2 Laps
10	PC	20	(United States) BAR1 Motorsports	(United States) Don Yount (United Kingdom) Ryan Lewis	Oreca FLM09	C	62	+3 Laps
10	PC	20	(United States) BAR1 Motorsports	(United States) Don Yount (United Kingdom) Ryan Lewis	Chevrolet 6.2 L V8	C	62	+3 Laps
11	**GTD**	**93**	**(United States) Michael Shank Racing with Curb Agajanian**	**(United States) Andy Lally** **(United Kingdom) Katherine Legge**	**Acura NSX GT3**	C	**62**	**+3 Laps‡**
11	**GTD**	**93**	**(United States) Michael Shank Racing with Curb Agajanian**	**(United States) Andy Lally** **(United Kingdom) Katherine Legge**	**Acura 3.5 L Turbo V6**	C	**62**	**+3 Laps‡**
12	GTD	63	(United States) Scuderia Corsa	(Denmark) Christina Nielsen (Italy) Alessandro Balzan	Ferrari 488 GT3	C	62	+3 Laps
12	GTD	63	(United States) Scuderia Corsa	(Denmark) Christina Nielsen (Italy) Alessandro Balzan	Ferrari F154CB 3.9 L Turbo V8	C	62	+3 Laps
13	GTD	48	(United States) Paul Miller Racing	(United States) Bryan Sellers (United States) Madison Snow	Lamborghini Huracán GT3	C	62	+3 Laps
13	GTD	48	(United States) Paul Miller Racing	(United States) Bryan Sellers (United States) Madison Snow	Lamborghini 5.2 L V10	C	62	+3 Laps
14	GTD	96	(United States) Turner Motorsport	(Germany) Jens Klingmann (United States) Bret Curtis	BMW M6 GT3	C	62	+3 Laps
14	GTD	96	(United States) Turner Motorsport	(Germany) Jens Klingmann (United States) Bret Curtis	BMW 4.4L Turbo V8	C	62	+3 Laps
15	GTD	86	(United States) Michael Shank Racing with Curb Agajanian	(United States) Jeff Segal (Brazil) Oswaldo Negri Jr.	Acura NSX GT3	C	62	+3 Laps
15	GTD	86	(United States) Michael Shank Racing with Curb Agajanian	(United States) Jeff Segal (Brazil) Oswaldo Negri Jr.	Acura 3.5 L Turbo V6	C	62	+3 Laps
16	GTD	14	(United States) 3GT Racing	(United States) Scott Pruett (United States) Sage Karam	Lexus RC F GT3	C	62	+3 Laps
16	GTD	14	(United States) 3GT Racing	(United States) Scott Pruett (United States) Sage Karam	Lexus 5.0L V8	C	62	+3 Laps
17	GTD	15	(United States) 3GT Racing	(United States) Robert Alon (United Kingdom) Jack Hawksworth	Lexus RC F GT3	C	62	+3 Laps
17	GTD	15	(United States) 3GT Racing	(United States) Robert Alon (United Kingdom) Jack Hawksworth	Lexus 5.0L V8	C	62	+3 Laps
18	GTD	54	(United States) CORE Autosport	(United States) Jon Bennett (United States) Colin Braun	Porsche 911 GT3 R	C	62	+3 Laps
18	GTD	54	(United States) CORE Autosport	(United States) Jon Bennett (United States) Colin Braun	Porsche 4.0 L Flat-6	C	62	+3 Laps
19	GTD	73	(United States) Park Place Motorsports	(Germany) Jörg Bergmeister (United States) Patrick Lindsey	Porsche 911 GT3 R	C	62	+3 Laps
19	GTD	73	(United States) Park Place Motorsports	(Germany) Jörg Bergmeister (United States) Patrick Lindsey	Porsche 4.0 L Flat-6	C	62	+3 Laps
20	GTD	28	(United States) Alegra Motorsports	(France) Mathieu Jaminet (Canada) Daniel Morad	Porsche 911 GT3 R	C	62	+3 Laps
20	GTD	28	(United States) Alegra Motorsports	(France) Mathieu Jaminet (Canada) Daniel Morad	Porsche 4.0 L Flat-6	C	62	+3 Laps
21	GTD	16	(United States) Change Racing	(United States) Corey Lewis (Netherlands) Jeroen Mul	Lamborghini Huracán GT3	C	61	+4 Laps
21	GTD	16	(United States) Change Racing	(United States) Corey Lewis (Netherlands) Jeroen Mul	Lamborghini 5.2 L V10	C	61	+4 Laps
22	GTD	50	(United States) Riley Motorsports – WeatherTech Racing	(United States) Cooper MacNeil (United States) Gunnar Jeannette	Mercedes-AMG GT3	C	60	+5 Laps
22	GTD	50	(United States) Riley Motorsports – WeatherTech Racing	(United States) Cooper MacNeil (United States) Gunnar Jeannette	Mercedes AMG M159 6.2 L V8	C	60	+5 Laps
23 DNF	P	2	(United States) Tequila Patrón ESM	(United States) Scott Sharp (United Kingdom) Ryan Dalziel	Nissan Onroak DPi	C	56	Rear end
23 DNF	P	2	(United States) Tequila Patrón ESM	(United States) Scott Sharp (United Kingdom) Ryan Dalziel	Nissan VR38DETT 3.8 L Turbo V6	C	56	Rear end
24 DNF	GTD	57	(United States) Stevenson Motorsports	(United States) Andrew Davis (United States) Lawson Aschenbach	Audi R8 LMS	C	43	Driveline
24 DNF	GTD	57	(United States) Stevenson Motorsports	(United States) Andrew Davis (United States) Lawson Aschenbach	Audi 5.2L V10	C	43	Driveline
25 DNF	PC	90	(United States) VisitFlorida Racing	(Belgium) Marc Goossens (Netherlands) Renger van der Zande	Riley Mk. 30	C	18	Crash
25 DNF	PC	90	(United States) VisitFlorida Racing	(Belgium) Marc Goossens (Netherlands) Renger van der Zande	Gibson GK428 4.2 L V8	C	18	Crash
26 DNF	GTD	33	(United States) Riley Motorsports – Team AMG	(Netherlands) Jeroen Bleekemolen (United States) Ben Keating	Mercedes-AMG GT3	C	17	Crash
26 DNF	GTD	33	(United States) Riley Motorsports – Team AMG	(Netherlands) Jeroen Bleekemolen (United States) Ben Keating	Mercedes AMG M159 6.2 L V8	C	17	Crash
27 DNF	GTD	75	(United States) SunEnergy1 Racing	(France) Tristan Vautier (Australia) Kenny Habul	Mercedes-AMG GT3	C	15	Crash
27 DNF	GTD	75	(United States) SunEnergy1 Racing	(France) Tristan Vautier (Australia) Kenny Habul	Mercedes AMG M159 6.2 L V8	C	15	Crash
28 DNF	P	52	(United States) PR1/Mathiasen Motorsports	(United States) Kenton Koch (United Kingdom) Ryan Lewis	Ligier JS P217	C	1	Quit
28 DNF	P	52	(United States) PR1/Mathiasen Motorsports	(United States) Kenton Koch (United Kingdom) Ryan Lewis	Gibson GK428 4.2 L V8	C	1	Quit

Tyre manufacturers
Key
Symbol	Tyre manufacturer
**C**	Continental

== Standings after the race ==
Prototype Drivers' Championship standings
Pos.	+/–	Driver	Points
1		(United States) Jordan Taylor (United States) Ricky Taylor	177
2		(Portugal) João Barbosa (Brazil) Christian Fittipaldi	147
3		(United States) Dane Cameron (United States) Eric Curran	143
4		(Canada) Misha Goikhberg (South Africa) Stephen Simpson	135
5		(United Kingdom) Ryan Dalziel (United States) Scott Sharp	129

PC Drivers' Championship standings
Pos.	+/–	Driver	Points
1		(United States) James French (Mexico) Patricio O'Ward	144
2		(United States) Don Yount	118
3	1	(United States) Buddy Rice	88
4	1	(United States) Kyle Masson	72
5	1	(United States) Nicholas Boulle	68

GTLM Drivers' Championship standings
Pos.	+/–	Driver	Points
1		(Spain) Antonio García (Denmark) Jan Magnussen	124
2		(United States) Joey Hand (Germany) Dirk Müller	118
3		(France) Patrick Pilet (Germany) Dirk Werner	110
4		(United States) Bill Auberlen (United Kingdom) Alexander Sims	108
5		(Australia) Ryan Briscoe (United Kingdom) Richard Westbrook	107

GTD Drivers' Championship standings
Pos.	+/–	Driver	Points
1		(Netherlands) Jeroen Bleekemolen (United States) Ben Keating	150
2		(Italy) Alessandro Balzan (Denmark) Christina Nielsen	141
3	1	(United States) Bryan Sellers (United States) Madison Snow	123
4	1	(Canada) Daniel Morad	122
5	2	(Brazil) Oswaldo Negri Jr. (United States) Jeff Segal	116

- Note: Only the top five positions are included for all sets of standings.

Prototype Teams' Championship standings
Pos.	+/–	Team	Points
1		(United States) #10 Wayne Taylor Racing	177
2		(United States) #5 Mustang Sampling Racing	147
3		(United States) #31 Whelen Engineering Racing	143
4		(United States) #85 JDC-Miller MotorSports	135
5		(United States) #2 Tequila Patrón ESM	129

PC Teams' Championship standings
Pos.	+/–	Team	Points
1		(United States) #38 Performance Tech Motorsports	144
2		(United States) #26 BAR1 Motorsports	125
3		(United States) #20 BAR1 Motorsports	118
4		(United States) #8 Starworks Motorsport	58
5		(United States) #88 Starworks Motorsport	28

GTLM Teams' Championship standings
Pos.	+/–	Team	Points
1		(United States) #3 Corvette Racing	124
2		(United States) #66 Ford Chip Ganassi Racing	118
3		(United States) #911 Porsche GT Team	110
4		(United States) #25 BMW Team RLL	108
5		(United States) #67 Ford Chip Ganassi Racing	107

GTD Teams' Championship standings
Pos.	+/–	Team	Points
1		(United States) #33 Riley Motorsports Team AMG	150
2		(United States) #63 Scuderia Corsa	141
3	1	(United States) #48 Paul Miller Racing	123
4	1	(United States) #28 Alegra Motorsports	122
5	2	(United States) #86 Michael Shank Racing with Curb-Agajanian	116

- Note: Only the top five positions are included for all sets of standings.

Prototype Manufacturers' Championship standings
Pos.	+/–	Manufacturer	Points
1		(United States) Cadillac	175
2		(Japan) Nissan	156
3		(Japan) Mazda	154

GTLM Manufacturers' Championship standings
Pos.	+/–	Manufacturer	Points
1		(United States) Chevrolet	133
2		(United States) Ford	127
3		(Germany) Porsche	118
4		(Germany) BMW	114
5		(Italy) Ferrari	112

GTD Manufacturers' Championship standing
Pos.	+/–	Manufacturer	Points
1		(Germany) Mercedes-AMG	159
2		(Italy) Ferrari	150
3		(Germany) Porsche	142
4	1	(Italy) Lamborghini	139
5	1	(Japan) Acura	137

- Note: Only the top five positions are included for all sets of standings.

IMSA SportsCar Championship
Previous race: Advance Auto Parts Sportscar Showdown	2017 season	Next race: 6 Hours of the Glen
