= Ed Brown (racing driver) =

American racing driver (born 1963)

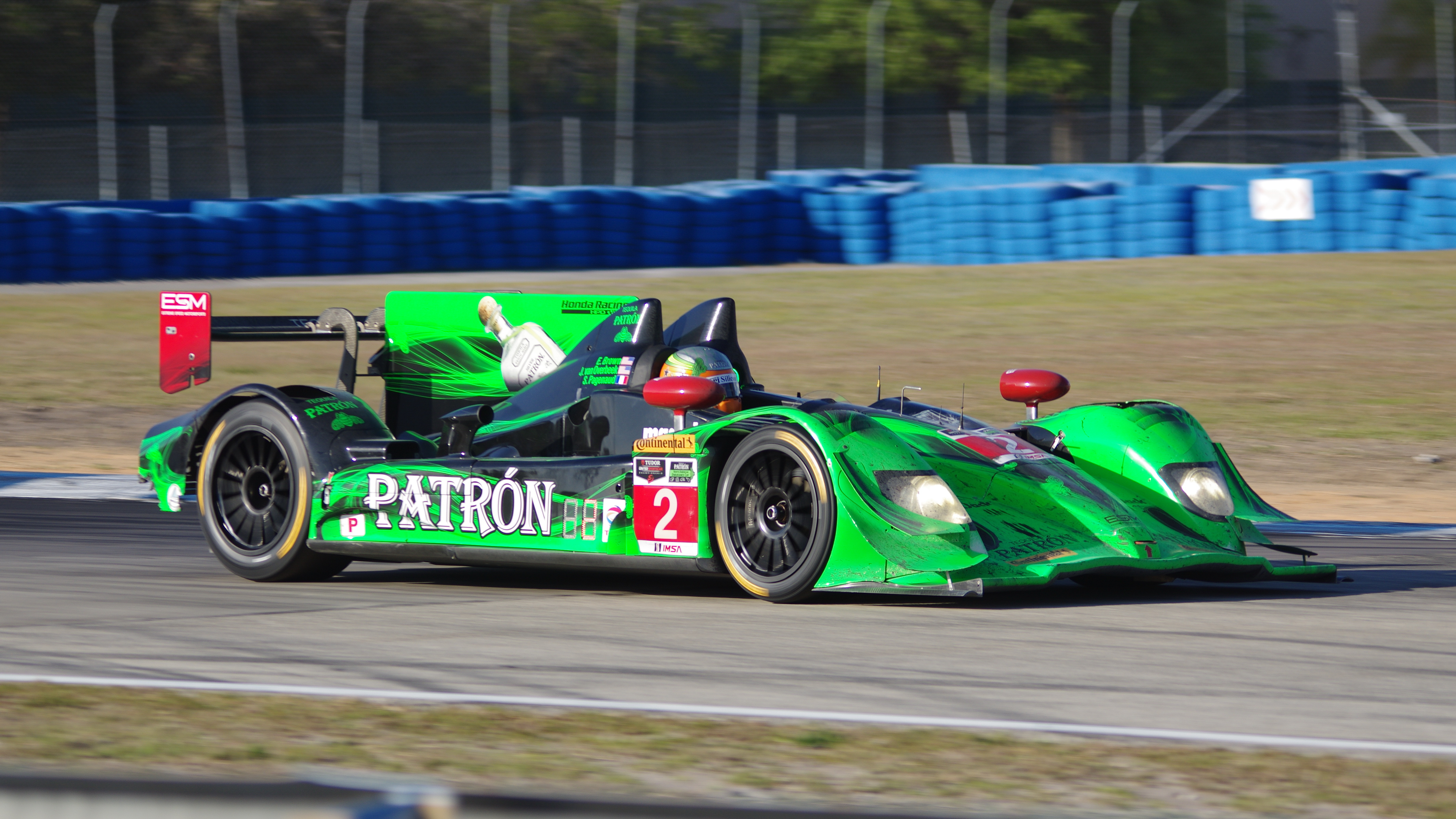
- Brown in 2014
- Nationality: (United States) American
- Born: January 18, 1963 (age 63) Denver, Colorado, United States
- Categorisation: FIA Silver (until 2015); FIA Bronze (2016–2019)

Edward Brown (born January 18, 1963) is an American businessman and retired race car driver who last competed in the United SportsCar Championship.

== Business career ==
Brown was president and CEO of Patrón Spirits Company, and founder of Extreme Speed Motorsports, the racing team for whom he drove. ESM was sponsored by Patrón.

== Racing career ==
Brown was the overall winner at the 2016 24 Hours of Daytona and the 2016 12 Hours of Sebring, both for Tequila Patrón ESM.

Brown also competed in the 2015 24 Hours of Le Mans and the 2016 24 Hours of Le Mans.

=== 24 Hours of Le Mans results ===
Year	Team	Co-Drivers	Car	Class	Laps	Pos.	Class Pos.
2015	(United States) Extreme Speed Motorsports	(United States) Johannes van Overbeek (United States) Jon Fogarty	Ligier JS P2-Honda	LMP2	339	15th	7th
2016	(United States) Extreme Speed Motorsports	(United States) Scott Sharp (United States) Johannes van Overbeek	Ligier JS P2-Nissan	LMP2	341	16th	10th

=== WeatherTech SportsCar Championship results ===
(key)(Races in bold indicate pole position, Results are overall/class)

Year	Team	Class	Make	Engine	1	2	3	4	5	6	7	8	9	10	11	Rank	Points
2014	Extreme Speed Motorsports	P	HPD ARX-03b	Honda HR28TT 2.8 L V6 Turbo	DAY; 7	SEB; 5	LBH; 7	LS; 1	DET; 7	WGL; 11	MSP; 7	IMS; 7	ELK; 8	COA; 4	PET	8th	262
2015	Tequila Patrón ESM	P	HPD ARX-04b 1 HPD ARX-03b 2	Honda HR28TT 2.8 L V6 Turbo	DAY; 14	SEB; 8	LBH	LS	DET	WGL	MSP	ELK	COA	PET		22nd	42
2016	Tequila Patrón ESM	P	Ligier JS P2	Honda HR35TT 3.5 L V6 Turbo	DAY; 1	SEB; 1	LBH	LS	DET	WGL	MSP	ELK	COA	PET		19th	72
2017	Tequila Patrón ESM	P	Nissan Onroak DPi	Nissan VR38DETT 3.8 L Turbo V6	DAY; 7	SEB; 10	LBH; 9	COA; 5	DET; 7	WGL	MSP	ELK	LS	PET		14th	117
