= Ligier Nissan DPi =

Ligier Nissan DPi Onroak Nissan DPi
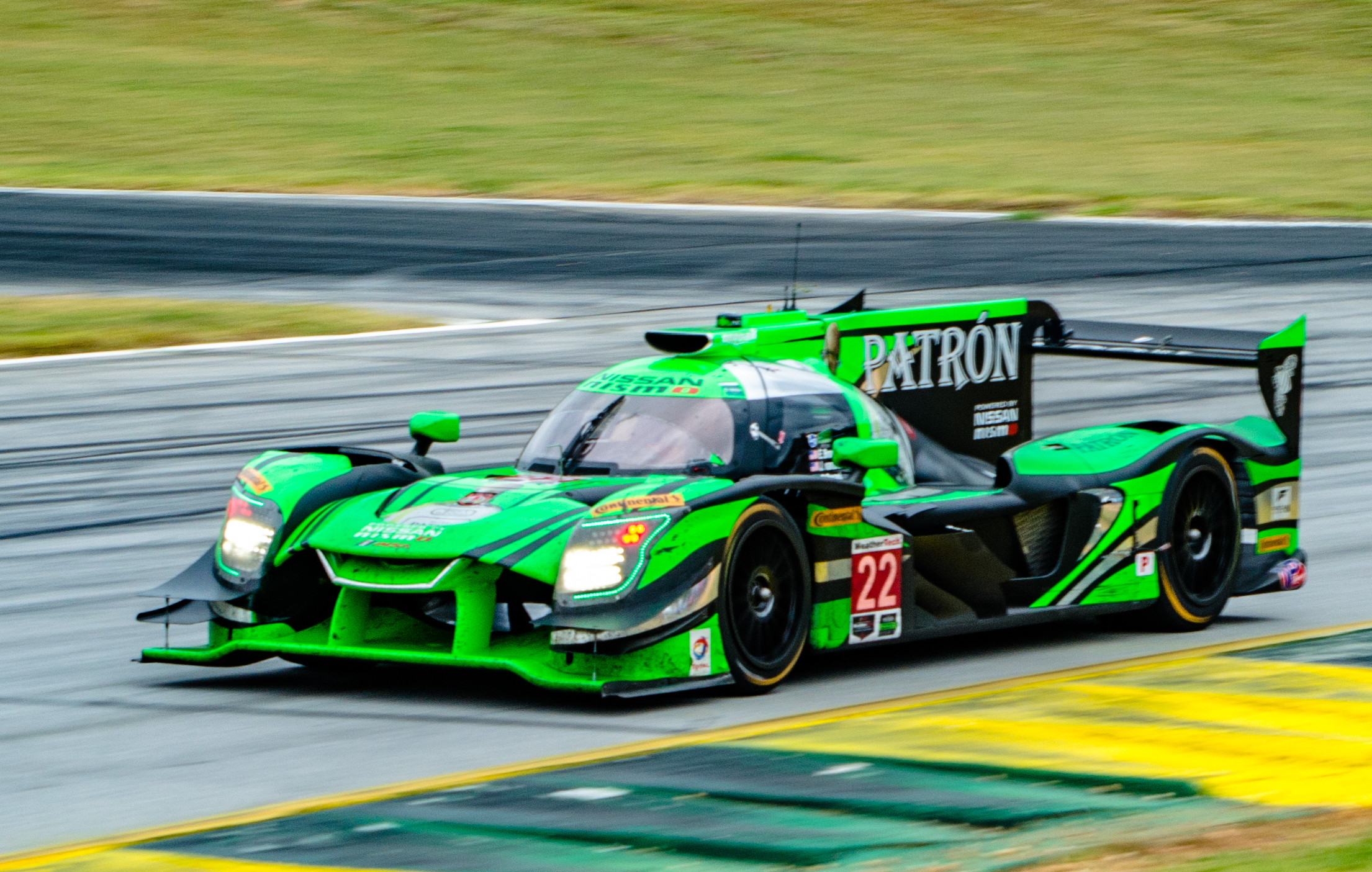
- The No. 22 Nissan DPi of ESM during the 2017 Petit Le Mans
- Category: Daytona Prototype International
- Constructor: Ligier Automotive
- Designer: Nicolas Clémençon

Technical specifications
- Chassis: Carbon fibre monocoque
- Suspension (front): Double wishbones with pushrod and torque rod-activated dampers
- Suspension (rear): Double wishbones with spring-activated dampers
- Length: 4,745 mm (186.8 in)
- Width: 1,900 mm (75 in)
- Wheelbase: 3,010 mm (119 in)
- Engine: Nissan VR38DETT 3.8 litre V6 twin turbo longitudinal mid-mounted configuration
- Transmission: Hewland TLS-200 6-speed sequential gearbox magnesium casing sequential manual transmission
- Power: 599 hp (447 kW)
- Weight: Appr. 930 kg (2,050 lb)
- Tyres: Michelin, or Continental

Competition history
- Notable entrants: (United States) Tequila Patrón ESM (United States) CORE Autosport
- Notable drivers: (United States) Scott Sharp (United States) Johannes van Overbeek (United States) Ed Brown (New Zealand) Brendon Hartley (Brazil) Pipo Derani (Brazil) Bruno Senna (United Kingdom) Ryan Dalziel (France) Olivier Pla (France) Norman Nato (France) Nicolas Lapierre (Germany) Timo Bernhard (United States) Jon Bennett (United States) Colin Braun (France) Romain Dumas (France) Loïc Duval
- Debut: 2017 24 Hours of Daytona
- First win: 2017 Continental Tire Road Race Showcase
- Last win: 2018 Monterey Grand Prix
- Last event: 2019 Petit Le Mans
Races	Wins	Podiums	Poles
30	4	8	4
- Teams' Championships: 0
- Constructors' Championships: 0
- Drivers' Championships: 0

The Ligier Nissan DPi, also known as the Onroak Nissan DPi, is a Daytona Prototype car built by Ligier Automotive. The car is based on the Ligier JS P217, which was built to meet the 2017 FIA and ACO regulations for 2017 for the LMP2 category in the FIA World Endurance Championship. The prototype made its racing debut at the 2017 24 Hours of Daytona, with the Tequila Patrón ESM team, finishing 4th on its debut.

== Development ==
On 21 September 2016, it was announced by Scott Sharp, the team owner of Tequila Patrón ESM, that the team would be returning to the IMSA WeatherTech SportsCar Championship full time for 2017, and departing the FIA World Endurance Championship. Simultaneously, it was announced that the team would be renewing its agreement with OAK Racing, and Onroak Automotive, and signing a new multi-year partnership with Nissan Nismo, who would supply the team the VR38DETT 3.8L V6 engine used in the Nissan GT-R GT3. It had been earlier rumored that the team would be running the VRX30A that had been run in the ill-fated Nissan GT-R LM Nismo, which was later refuted by the announcement. The programme would be a non-works supported, customer effort, and it was later revealed that ESM had signed an exclusivity agreement with Nissan for 2 years. The car had its unveiling and shakedown at the Sebring International Raceway in Florida, on 22 December 2016. Between the JS P217 and the DPi, a number of differences were noted, with a large front panel covering the nose area, alongside revised side panels. The final design of the car was also noted to be different from the initial proposals to the Championship governing body, the International Motor Sports Association.

The car was noted to be overweight, compared to its base sibling, the Ligier JS P217, owing to the Nissan VR38DETT engine being over 50 kilograms heavier than the Gibson Technology powerplant utilized in the JS P217.

== Racing history ==
=== 2017 season ===
The 2017 season began at the 2017 Rolex 24 At Daytona, with both cars showing strong pace, with the #2 car even leading the race during the rainy night portion of the race, but a number of electrical problems, a penalty as well as a number of spins in the wet saw the team finish just outside the podium, in 4th. At the 2017 BUBBA Burger Sports Car Grand Prix, held at the Long Beach Street Circuit, the team would score its first podium with the car, with the #2 car scoring a 2nd-place finish, and the fastest lap of the race. At the 6 Hours of Watkins Glen, Pipo Derani scored the first Pole position for the car. The #22 car would secure the first win for the car at the Continental Tire Road Race Showcase, held at Road America, with the team scoring a 1-3 finish and breaking the 7-race win streak for the Cadillac DPi-V.R. This first win for the car came following a change in the car's electronics from Cosworth to Motec, which had been made in an attempt to increase the reliability of the car. Later, at the season ending Petit Le Mans, the #2 car would benefit from late penalties for the sister #22 car, and the #5 Mustang Sampling Racing cars to win.

=== 2018 season ===
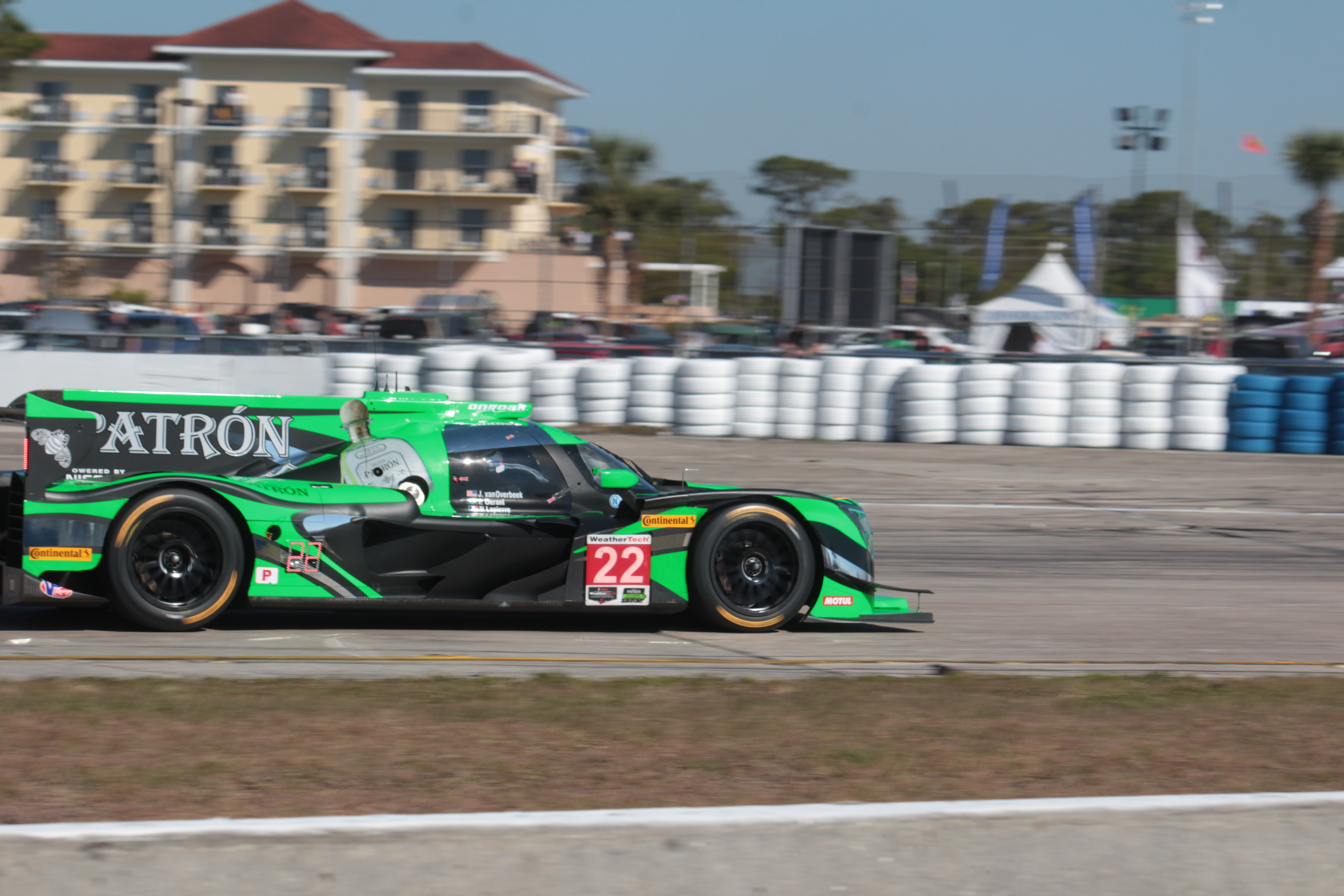
The #22 Tequila Patrón ESM Nissan-Onroak DPi en route to victory at the 2018 12 Hours of Sebring

The 2018 season started with a double retirement at the 2018 Rolex 24 at Daytona, in spite of the #22 car leading the race for several laps. At the following race, the 12 Hours of Sebring, the team would bounce back, scoring a win, following a strong late-race drive by Pipo Derani. Following the disastrous weekend during the 6 Hours of Watkins Glen, where the team had used 3 engines, and suffered 2 engine failures, the team scaled down its entry to a single car at the Canadian Tire Motorsport Park. Even after the announcement by Patrón that they were to end its involvement in motorsports, Extreme Speed Motorsports had still aimed and intended to continue its participation in the 2019 season with the car. The team later announced it was to relinquish its exclusivity deal with Onroak Automotive, making the car available for purchase with other teams through Onroak. At the America's Tire 250, held at the WeatherTech Raceway Laguna Seca, the car would score its 4th and final win under ESM, and while Derani would score a pole for his final race with the team at the 2018 Petit Le Mans, the team was unable to repeat its win in the previous edition of the race, with the #22 finishing in 6th, while the #2 car would finish 11th. Following the end of the season, ESM would sell both cars to CORE Autosport, before closing its doors.

=== 2019 season ===
Due to the withdrawal of title sponsor Patrón Spirits, ESM was forced to shut its doors in November 2018. Subsequently, CORE Autosport announced it would run one car, having acquired both ESM chassis. On 23 August 2019, it was announced by CORE Autosport, that due to the retirement of team owner/driver Jon Bennett, the team would be ceasing its Daytona Prototype International programme, following the season ending 2019 Petit Le Mans, and solely shift its focus on the Porsche factory GT Le Mans Programme. It has also been said that the discontinuation of the programme at CORE Autosport would likely mean an end to racing for the car, as it was known that Nissan had previously shown little interest in supporting the effort.

== Results summary ==
=== Complete IMSA SportsCar Championship results ===
(key) Races in bold indicates pole position. Races in italics indicates fastest lap. (key) Races in bold indicates pole position. Races in italics indicates fastest lap.

Complete IMSA SportsCar Championship results
Year	Entrant	Class	Drivers	No.	Rds.	Rounds										Pts.	Pos.
Year	Entrant	Class	Drivers	No.	Rds.	1	2	3	4	5	6	7	8	9	10	Pts.	Pos.
2017	(United States) Tequila Patrón ESM	P	(United Kingdom) Ryan Dalziel (United States) Scott Sharp (Brazil) Pipo Derani (New Zealand) Brendon Hartley	2	All; All; 1-2, 6; 1, 12	DAY; 4	SEB; 11	LBH; 2	COA; 6	BEL; 8	**WGL**; 7	MOS; 3	ELK; 3	LGA; 6	ATL; 1	273	5th
2017	(United States) Tequila Patrón ESM	P	(United States) Johannes van Overbeek (United States) Ed Brown (Brazil) Bruno Senna (New Zealand) Brendon Hartley (Brazil) Pipo Derani	22	All; 1-5; 1-2, 6, 12; 1-2; 7, 9, 11–12	DAY; 7	SEB; 10	LBH; 9	COA; 5	BEL; 7	WGL; 8	MOS; 9	ELK; 1	LGA; 8	ATL; 4	249	6th
2018	(United States) Tequila Patrón ESM	P	(United Kingdom) Ryan Dalziel (United States) Scott Sharp (France) Olivier Pla (France) Norman Nato	2	1-6, 9, 11–12; 1-2, 6; 12	DAY; 19	SEB; 16	LBH; 2	MOH; 10	BEL; 4	WGL; 15	MOS	ELK; 9	LGA; 11	ATL; 11	186	13rd
2018	(United States) Tequila Patrón ESM	P	(Brazil) Pipo Derani (United States) Johannes van Overbeek (France) Nicolas Lapierre (United Kingdom) Ryan Dalziel (Germany) Timo Bernhard	22	All; 1-6, 9, 11–12; 1-2, 6; 7; 12	DAY; 18	SEB; 1	LBH; 12	MOH; 9	**BEL**; 7	WGL; 16	MOS; 12	ELK; 6	LGA; 1	**ATL**; 6	232	9th
2019	(United States) CORE Autosport	DPi	(United States) Jon Bennett (United States) Colin Braun (France) Romain Dumas (France) Loïc Duval	54	All; All; 1-2, 6, 12; 1	DAY; 4	SEB; 5	LBH; 11	MOH; 11	BEL; 7	WGL; 11	MOS; 7	ELK; 10	LGA; 7	ATL; 8	230	9th
