= Johannes van Overbeek =

American racing driver

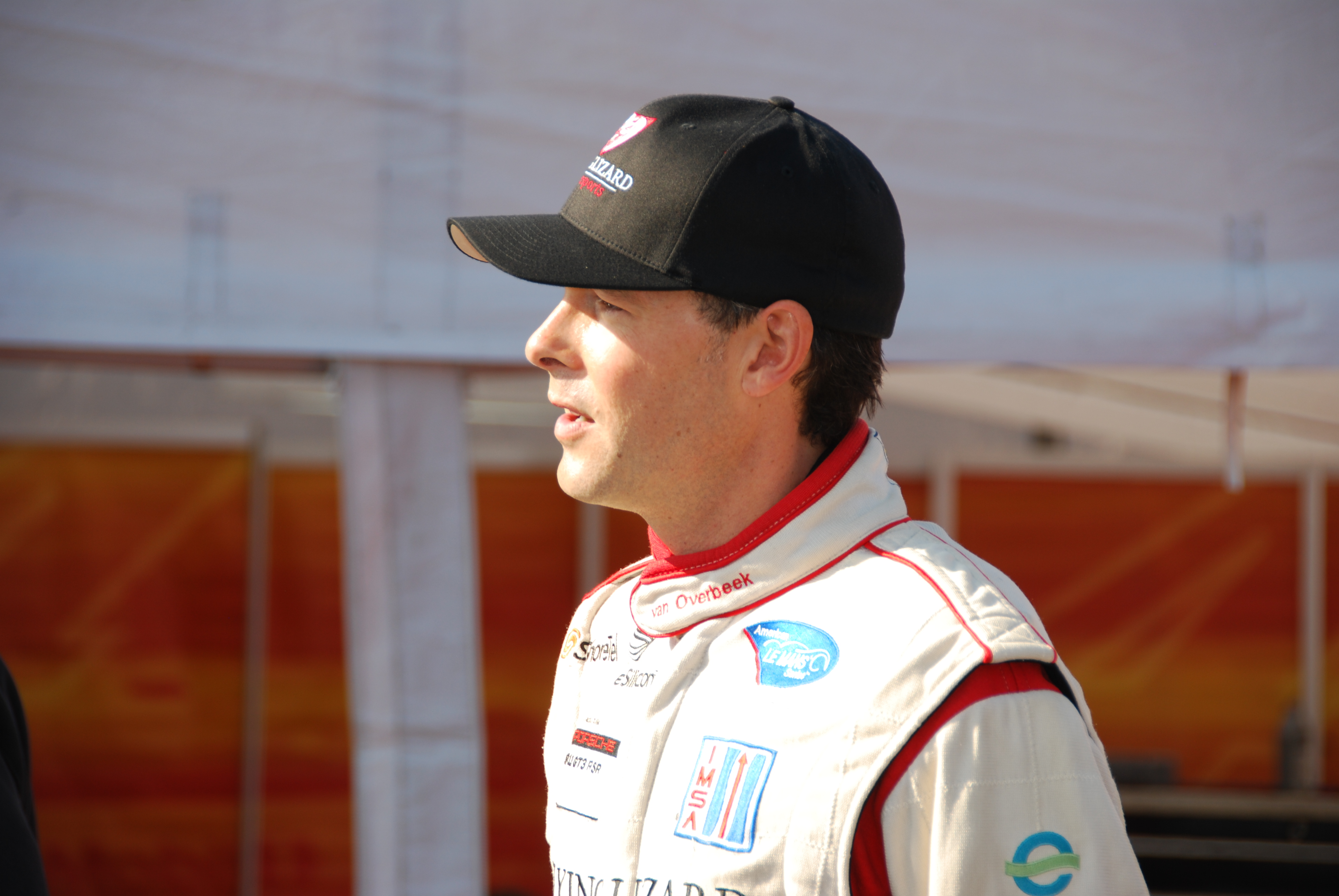
- Van Overbeek in 2008
- Nationality: (United States) American
- Born: April 14, 1973 (age 53) Sacramento, California, U.S.
- Categorisation: FIA Platinum (until 2012); FIA Gold (2013–)

Johannes van Overbeek (/jəˈhɑːnəs væn ˈoʊvərbɛk/; born April 14, 1973) is a Dutch-American former race car driver in the WeatherTech SportsCar Championship. He most recently drove a Nissan Onroak DPi for Extreme Speed Motorsports.

== Career ==
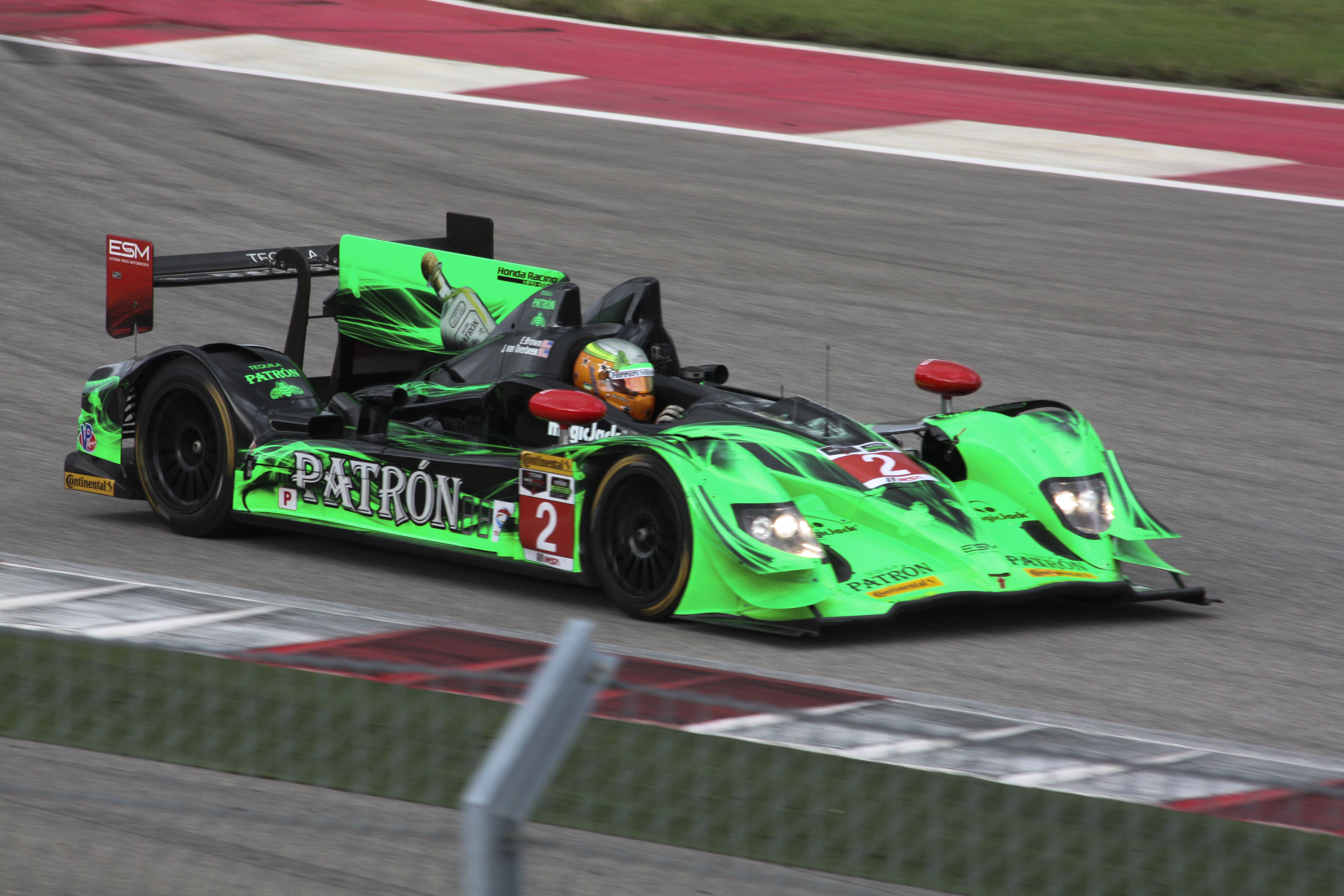
Van Overbeek racing for ESM at the 2014 Lone Star Le Mans.

Van Overbeek raced go-karts as a child, and began racing sedans at eighteen. Since 1996, he has competed in several racing series in North America, including the Speed World Challenge, the American Le Mans Series, and Grand-Am. In 2007, van Overbeek won the Porsche Cup award as the top non-factory Porsche driver in the world. He finished third in 2008. As of 2013, van Overbeek has eight wins in the ALMS. He was the only driver in ALMS to finish in the top-three of the driver's championship every year from 2004 to 2008. In 2009, van Overbeek drove for Flying Lizard Motorsports.

Van Overbeek switched to Extreme Speed Motorsports for 2010. With co-driver Scott Sharp, van Overbeek finished second in the 2012 ALMS GT championship in a Ferrari 458 GT2 with two wins for ESM. Van Overbeek has competed in four 24 Hours of Le Mans races, finishing sixth in GT2 in 2008, fourth in 2006, and third in 2005.

Van Overbeek lives in Oakland, California with his wife and two sons.

== 24 Hours of Le Mans results ==
Year	Team	Co-Drivers	Car	Class	Laps	Pos.	Class Pos.
2005	(United States) Flying Lizard Motorsports	(United States) Lonnie Pechnik (United States) Seth Neiman	Porsche 911 GT3-RSR	GT2	323	13th	**3rd**
2006	(United States) Flying Lizard Motorsports	(United States) Patrick Long (United States) Seth Neiman	Porsche 911 GT3-RSR	GT2	309	18th	4th
2007	(United States) Flying Lizard Motorsports	(Germany) Jörg Bergmeister (United States) Seth Neiman	Porsche 997 GT3-RSR	GT2	124	DNF	DNF
2008	(United States) Flying Lizard Motorsports	(Germany) Jörg Bergmeister (United States) Seth Neiman	Porsche 997 GT3-RSR	GT2	289	32nd	6th
2015	(United States) Extreme Speed Motorsports	(United States) Ed Brown (United States) Jon Fogarty	Ligier JS P2-Honda	LMP2	339	15th	7th
2016	(United States) Extreme Speed Motorsports	(United States) Ed Brown (United States) Scott Sharp	Ligier JS P2-Nissan	LMP2	341	16th	10th

=== WeatherTech SportsCar Championship results ===
(key)(Races in bold indicate pole position, Results are overall/class)

Year	Team	Class	Make	Engine	1	2	3	4	5	6	7	8	9	10	11	Rank	Points	Ref
2014	Extreme Speed Motorsports	P	HPD ARX-03b	Honda HR28TT 2.8 L V6 Turbo	DAY; 7	SIR; 5	LBH; 7	LS; 1	DET; 7	WGL; 11	MSP; 7	IMS; 7	ELK; 8	COA; 4	PET	8th	262	
2015	Tequila Patrón ESM	P	HPD ARX-04b 1 HPD ARX-03b 2	Honda HR28TT 2.8 L V6 Turbo	DAY; 14	SIR; 8	LBH	LS	DET	WGL	MSP	ELK	COA	PET		22nd	42	
2016	Tequila Patrón ESM	P	Ligier JS P2	Honda HR35TT 3.5 L V6 Turbo	DAY; 1	SIR; 1	LBH	LS	DET	**WGL**; **9**	MSP	ELK	COA	PET; 2		12th	128	
2017	Tequila Patrón ESM	P	Nissan Onroak DPi	Nissan VR38DETT 3.8 L Turbo V6	DAY; 7	SEB; 10	LBH; 9	COA; 5	DET; 7	WGL; 8	MSP; 9	ELK; 1	LS; 8	PET; 4		6th	249	
2018	Tequila Patrón ESM	P	Nissan Onroak DPi	Nissan VR38DETT 3.8 L Turbo V6	DAY; 18	SEB; 1	LBH; 12	MDO; 9	**DET**; 7	WGL; 15	MOS	ELK; 6	LGA; 1	**PET**; 6		12th	213	
