= Extreme Speed Motorsports =

Sports car racing team

(United States) Extreme Speed Motorsports
- Founded: 2010
- Folded: 2018
- Team principal(s): Ed Brown; Scott Sharp
- Former series: American Le Mans Series; FIA World Endurance Championship; WeatherTech SportsCar Championship

Extreme Speed Motorsports (ESM) was an American auto racing team based out of Riviera Beach, Florida. Founded by Scott Sharp and Patrón CEO Ed Brown, the team competed in the FIA World Endurance Championship, Tudor United SportsCar Championship, and American Le Mans Series since 2010 until 2018 when the team sold its equipment and race cars and shut down following an exhaustive sponsor search after the withdrawal of Patrón.

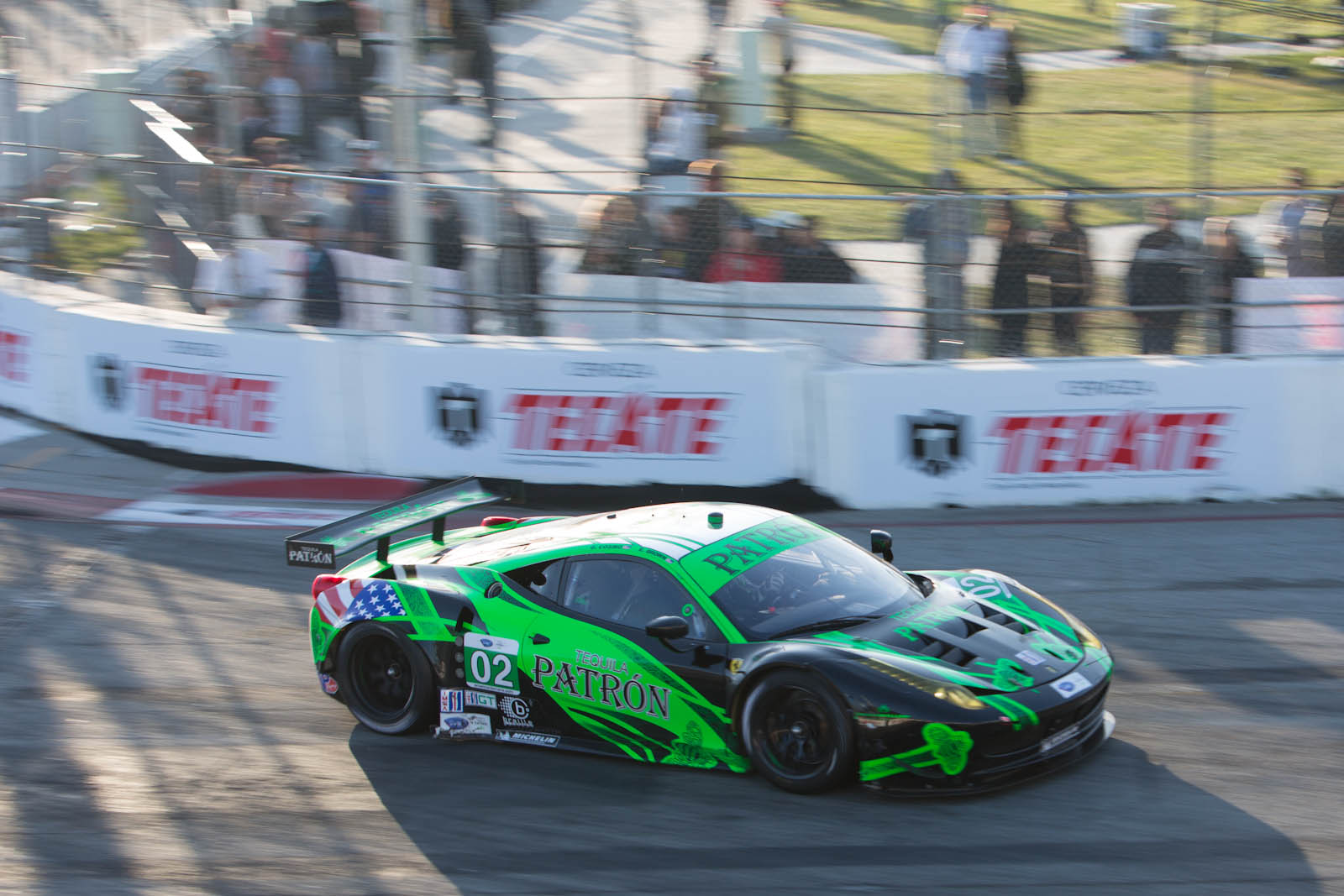
The team's Ferrari 458 Italia at the 2012 Grand Prix of Long Beach.

== American Le Mans Series ==
The Extreme Speed Motorsports team first entered the American Le Mans Series with two Ferrari F430 GTCs in 2010. The pair of Scott Sharp and Johannes van Overbeek managed a second-place finish at the season ending Petit Le Mans, finishing tenth in the Drivers' Championship with teammates Ed Brown and Guy Cosmo finishing thirteenth and landing fifth in the GT class Teams' Championship.

The team received two new Ferrari 458 GTEs for their second year of ALMS competition. 2011 season would prove to be a difficult season for the team with the #02 car failing to finish at several races. The team's best result came at penultimate race at Mazda Raceway Laguna Seca with a third-place finish for the #01 car. Sharp and Van Overbeek would finish the season seventh in the GT Drivers' Championship with the team landing sixth in the Teams' Championship.

2012 would be the most successful season yet for the team and its Ferraris. The #01 car of Sharp and van Overbeek was awarded a victory after a post race technical inspection disqualified the #45 Flying Lizard Motorsports Porsche at Mosport and earned another hard-fought win at the season finale Petit Le Mans. Scott Sharp and Johannes van Overbeek finished second in the GT Drivers' Championship with Ed Brown and Guy Cosmo fifteen and sixteen respectively. They would finish third in the GT Teams' Championship behind the factory efforts of BMW and Chevrolet.

2013 saw the team move up to the LMP2 class with two HPD ARX-03bs. 2013 would be the final season before the American Le Mans Series would merge with the Rolex Sports Car Series to form the Tudor United SportsCar Championship. Although 2013 was to be a preparation and development year for the team's new prototype machinery, the team fared well against their main rivals Level 5 Motorsports, claiming a win and second-place finish at Long Beach. The team finished the season second in the Teams' Championship with Scott Sharp second in the Drivers' Championship.

Year	Car	Engine	1	2	3	4	5	6	7	8	9	10	Position	Points
2010	Ferrari Ferrari 430 GTE	Ferrari 4.0L V8	SEB; 6	LBH; 7	LGA; 5	UGP; 7	LRP; 6	MDO; 5	ROA; 5	MOS; 6	ATL; 2		5th	91
2011	Ferrari 458 Italia GT2	Ferrari 4.5L V8	SEB; 8	LBH; 9	LRP; 4	MOS; 9	MDO; 5	ROA; 8	BAL; 9	LGA; 3	ATL; 5		6th	81
2012	Ferrari 458 Italia GT2	Ferrari 4.5L V8	SEB; 7	LBH; 3	LGA; 5	LRP; 4	MOS; 1	MDO; 6	ROA; 7	BAL; 3	VIR; 3	ATL; 1	3rd	125
2013	HPD ARX-03b	Honda HR28TT 2.8L Turbo V6	SEB; 3	LBH; 1	LGA; 3	LRP; 1	MOS; 2	ROA; 2	BAL; 2	AUS; 3	VIR; 2	ATL; 3	2nd	169

== United SportsCar Championship ==
The Extreme Speed Motorsports team entered the inaugural season of the Tudor United SportsCar Championship with a two car LMP2 effort in the premier prototype class. Scott Sharp and Ryan Dalziel would pilot the #1 HPD with Johannes van Overbeek and Ed Brown sharing the #2 car. IMSA's balance of performance left the LMP2 teams with a substantial gap in top speed to the much higher powered Daytona Prototypes throughout the entirety of the season, preventing the team from consistently competing for overall victories. Brown and Overbeek would claim a win victory at Mazda Raceway Laguna Seca, a track that favored the LMP2 cars' cornering speeds. The team withdrew the #1 car from the eleventh round to compete in the FIA World Endurance Championship race at the Circuit of the Americas, later deciding to withdraw both cars from the season ending Petit Le Mans to enter the Shanghai FIA WEC race in preparation for a 2015 campaign in the series

For the 2015 season, the ESM team originally committed to run the North American Endurance Championship rounds as a supplement to their FIA WEC campaign. However, after unsuccessful results at Daytona and Sebring, the team would not return to complete the rest of the North American season, choosing to focus its resources on the remainder of the WEC season.

In 2016, Tequila Patron ESM run a Ligier JS P2 in four North American Endurance Cup races of the United Sportscar Championship, winning both the 2016 24 Hours of Daytona and the 2016 12 Hours of Sebring, with the JS P2 becoming the first car to defeat a Daytona Prototype at the 24 hours, as well as the team becoming the first to win the so-called "36 Hours of Florida" since 1998.

In 2017, Tequila Patron ESM switched to Nissan engines, fielding two Nissan Onroak DPi units for Dalziel/Sharp and Van Overbeek/Brown. The pairing of Dalziel/Sharp would ultimately secure 5th in the drivers championship, while Brown would depart the team mid-season, and be replaced by Pipo Derani. The season was highlighted with 1 Pole Position at Watkins Glen, as well as 2 wins, at Road America, and at the season-ending Petit Le Mans.

In 2018, Tequila Patron ESM continued to run 2 Nissan-Onroak DPis, for Dalziel/Sharp, as well as Derani/Van Overbeek. The Season would be highlighted by 2 poles at Belle Isle, and at Road Atlanta, as well as winning the 12 Hours Of Sebring, and at Laguna Seca. However, due to the loss of title sponsor Patron, the team sold all its equipment and assets, and would ultimately close in December 2018.

Year	Car	Engine	No.	DAY	SEB	LBH	LGA	BEL	WGL	MOS	IMS	ELK	AUS	ATL	Points	Pos.
2014	HPD ARX-03b	Honda HR28TT 2.8L Turbo V6	1	15	2	6	11	5	10	8	5	3			228	10th
2014	HPD ARX-03b	Honda HR28TT 2.8L Turbo V6	2	7	5	7	1	7	11	7	7	8	4		262	7th
2015	HPD ARX-04b; HPD ARX-03b	Honda HR28TT 2.8L Turbo V6	1	10	9										45	12th
2015	HPD ARX-04b; HPD ARX-03b	Honda HR28TT 2.8L Turbo V6	2	14	8										42	13th
2016	Ligier JS P2	Honda HR35TT 3.5L Turbo V6	2	1	1				9					2	128	9th

=== WeatherTech SportsCar Championship wins ===
#	Season	Date	Classes	Track / Race	No.	Winning drivers	Chassis	Engine
1	2014	May 4	Prototype	Laguna Seca	2	(United States) Ed Brown / (United States) Johannes van Overbeek	HPD ARX-03b	Honda HR28TT 2.8 L V6 Turbo
2	2016	January 30–31	Prototype	Daytona	2	(United States) Brown / (Brazil) Derani / (United States) van Overbeek / (United States) Sharp	Ligier JS P2	Honda HR35TT 3.5 L V6 Turbo
3	2016	March 19	Prototype	Sebring	2	(United States) Brown / (Brazil) Derani / (United States) van Overbeek / (United States) Sharp	Ligier JS P2	Honda HR35TT 3.5 L V6 Turbo
4	2017	August 6	Prototype	Road America	22	(Brazil) Pipo Derani / (United States) Johannes van Overbeek	Nissan Onroak DPi	Nissan VR38DETT 3.8 L Turbo V6
5	2017	October 7	Prototype	Road Atlanta	2	(United Kingdom) Ryan Dalziel / (New Zealand) Brendon Hartley / (United States) Scott Sharp	Nissan Onroak DPi	Nissan VR38DETT 3.8 L Turbo V6
6	2018	March 17	Prototype	Sebring	22	(Brazil) Derani / (France) Lapierre / (United States) van Overbeek	Nissan Onroak DPi	Nissan VR38DETT 3.8 L Turbo V6
7	2018	September 9	Prototype	Laguna Seca	22	(Brazil) Pipo Derani / (United States) Johannes van Overbeek	Nissan Onroak DPi	Nissan VR38DETT 3.8 L Turbo V6

== World Endurance Championship ==
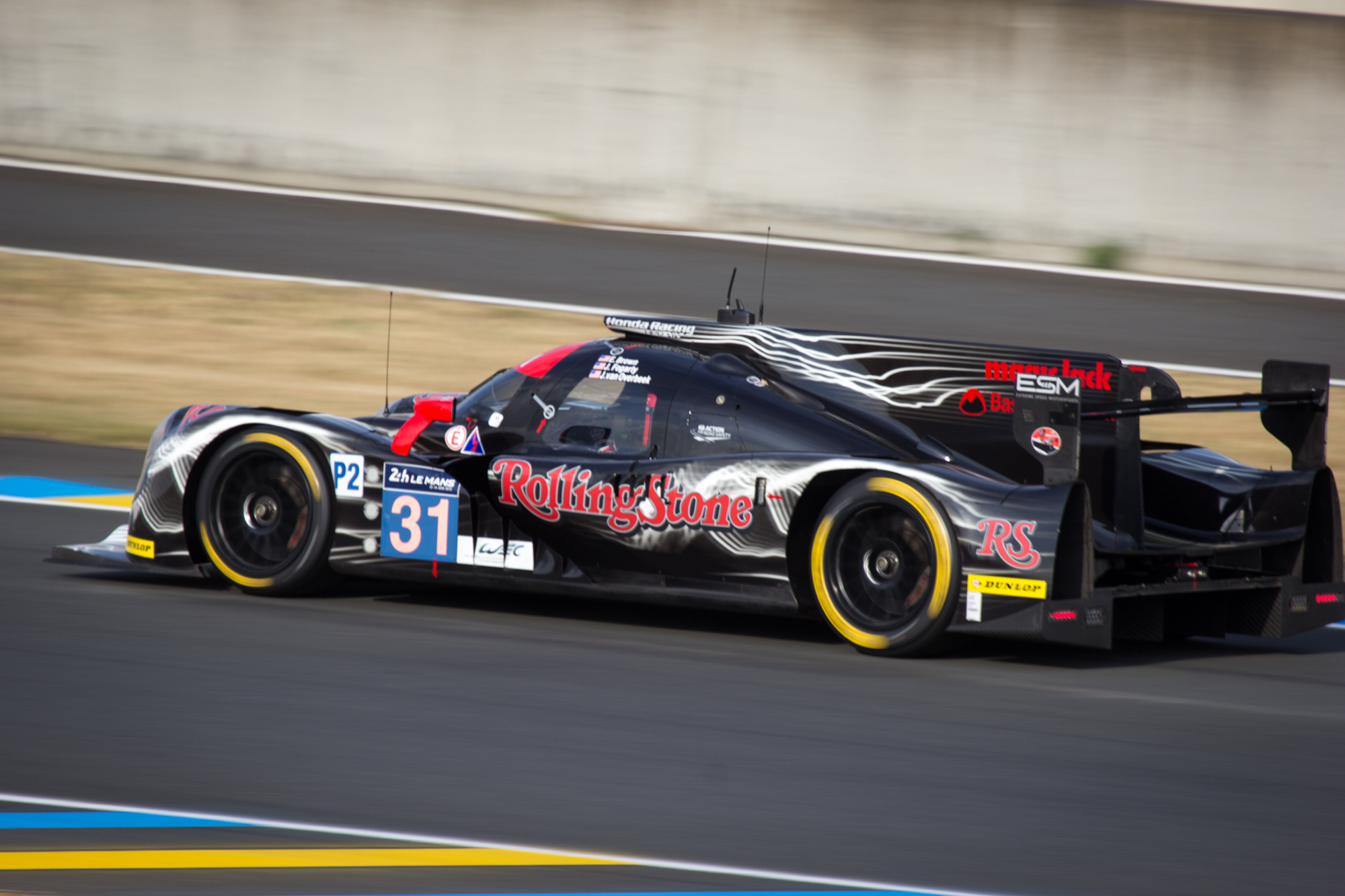
Extreme Speed Motorsports sporting their non-alcoholic livery at the 2015 24 Hours of Le Mans.

The team first entered the FIA World Endurance Championship with a single car at the 2014 6 Hours of Circuit of the Americas, earning a 3rd-place finish. The team then entered two cars in the 6 Hours of Shanghai claiming 2nd and 5th-place finishes. The two events would serve as preparation for a full season entry in 2015.

For the 2015 season, Extreme Speed Motorsports would commit to a full season FIA WEC effort. While originally planning to run the new HPD ARX-04b, testing issues meant HPD would delay the car's debut until the following season. ESM would instead use their ARX-03bs for the opening round at Silverstone, before switching to the Ligier JS P2 platform for the rest of the season.

Year	Car	Engine	No.	SIL (United Kingdom)	SPA (Belgium)	LMS (France)	NÜR (Germany)	COA (United States)	FUJ (Japan)	SHA (China)	BHR (Bahrain)	Points	Pos.
2015	HPD ARX-03b; Ligier JS P2	Honda HR28TT 2.8L Turbo V6	30	EX	8	5	6	4	4	Ret	7	62	7th
2015	HPD ARX-03b; Ligier JS P2	Honda HR28TT 2.8L Turbo V6	31	6	7	4	8	Ret	7	5	8	62	8th

Year	Car	Engine	No.	SIL (United Kingdom)	SPA (Belgium)	LMS (France)	NÜR (Germany)	MEX (Mexico)	COA (United States)	FUJ (Japan)	SHA (China)	BHR (Bahrain)	Points	Pos.
2016	Ligier JS P2	Nissan VK45DE 4.5L V8	30	8	5	7	9	8	7	4	2	5	78	5th
2016	Ligier JS P2	Nissan VK45DE 4.5L V8	31	2	2	8	3	3	5	5	5	4	116	4th

== 24 Hours of Le Mans ==
Year	Entrant	No.	Car	Drivers	Class	Laps	Pos.	Class Pos.
2015	(United States) Extreme Speed Motorsports	30	Ligier JS P2-Honda	(United Kingdom) Ryan Dalziel (Denmark) David Heinemeier Hansson (United States) Scott Sharp	LMP2	329	28th	10th
2015	(United States) Extreme Speed Motorsports	31	Ligier JS P2-Honda	(United States) Ed Brown (United States) Jon Fogarty (United States) Johannes van Overbeek	LMP2	339	15th	7th
2016	(United States) Extreme Speed Motorsports	30	Ligier JS P2-Nissan	(United States) Ed Brown (United States) Scott Sharp (United States) Johannes van Overbeek	LMP2	341	16th	11th
2016	(United States) Extreme Speed Motorsports	31	Ligier JS P2-Nissan	(Canada) Chris Cumming (United Kingdom) Ryan Dalziel (Brazil) Pipo Derani	LMP2	297	42nd	16th
