= 2010 Intercontinental Le Mans Cup =

- Organizer: Automobile Club de l'Ouest
- Discipline: Sports car endurance racing
- Number of races: 3

Champions
- LMP1 Manufacturer: (France) Peugeot
- GT2 Manufacturer: (Italy) Ferrari
- LMP1 Team: (France) Team Peugeot Total
- LMP2 Team: (France) OAK Racing
- GT1 Team: (France) Larbre Compétition
- GT2 Team: (Germany) Team Felbermayr-Proton

Intercontinental Le Mans Cup
- 2011 →

The 2010 Intercontinental Le Mans Cup was the inaugural running of the Automobile Club de l'Ouest's (ACO) Intercontinental Le Mans Cup, an international auto racing championship for manufacturers and teams. The Cup featured endurance races from the American Le Mans Series, Le Mans Series, and Asian Le Mans Series, as well as teams representing each of the three series. Winning teams were awarded with automatic invitations to the 2011 24 Hours of Le Mans. As with the three racing series based on Le Mans, the Intercontinental Cup featured the ACO's four premiere classes: LMP1, LMP2, GT1, and GT2. Six manufacturers and eighteen teams vied for the Cup in each of the four classes utilized in Le Mans racing.

== Race calendar and event results ==
The debut year of the Intercontinental Cup featured three events in the autumn. It consisted of the final rounds of the American Le Mans Series and Le Mans Series, as well as the sole event on the Asian Le Mans Series schedule. The opening round in September featured the 1000 km of Silverstone at the Silverstone Circuit in Great Britain, followed by a 1000-mile race for the Petit Le Mans at Road Atlanta in the United States in October. The final event, the 1000 km of Zhuhai, was the first Le Mans-style competition in China, held at the Zhuhai International Circuit in November.

Note that for each individual race, cars not competing in the Intercontinental Cup may have won their respective class. However, only the highest finishing Cup entrant is listed below.

Overall winners in bold.

Rnd.	Circuit	Date	LMP1 Cup Leaders	LMP2 Cup Leaders	GT1 Cup Leaders	GT2 Cup Leaders	Report
1	Silverstone	12 September	(France) **No. 1 Team Peugeot Total**	(France) No. 35 OAK Racing (Note: Third in class in the race.)	(France) No. 50 Larbre Compétition (Note: Only class entrant in the race.)	(Italy) No. 96 AF Corse	Report
1	Silverstone	12 September	(France) **Nicolas Minassian** (United Kingdom) **Anthony Davidson**	(France) Guillaume Moreau (Monaco) Richard Hein	(Switzerland) Gabriele Gardel (France) Patrice Goueslard (Brazil) Fernando Rees	(Italy) Gianmaria Bruni (Brazil) Jaime Melo	Report
2	Road Atlanta	2 October	(France) **No. 08 Team Peugeot Total**	(France) No. 35 OAK Racing (Note: Third in class in the race.)	Did Not Participate	(United States) No. 62 Risi Competizione (Note: Third in class in the race.)	Report
2	Road Atlanta	2 October	(France) **Franck Montagny** (France) **Stéphane Sarrazin** (Portugal) **Pedro Lamy**	(France) Jacques Nicolet (France) Frédéric Da Rocha (France) Patrice Lafargue		(Italy) Gianmaria Bruni (Finland) Toni Vilander	Report
3	Zhuhai	7 November	(France) **No. 2 Team Peugeot Total**	(France) No. 35 OAK Racing	(France) No. 50 Larbre Compétition	(Germany) No. 78 BMW Team Schnitzer	Report
3	Zhuhai	7 November	(France) **Franck Montagny** (France) **Stéphane Sarrazin**	(France) Jacques Nicolet (France) Frédéric Da Rocha (France) Patrice Lafargue	(France) Laurent Groppi (France) Patrick Bornhauser (Portugal) Pedro Lamy	(Germany) Jörg Müller (Germany) Dirk Werner	Report

== Championship awards ==
The points scale for the championship included all individual race participants who completed 70% of the winner's distance, although points were only awarded to designated entries in the Intercontinental Cup. A bonus point was also available if an ILMC team scored pole position for an event.

Points System
1st	2nd	3rd	4th	5th	6th	7th	8th	9th	10th	11th	12th	13th	14th	15th	16th	17th	18th	19th	20th	21st	22nd	Pole position
25	22	20	19	18	17	16	15	14	13	12	11	10	9	8	7	6	5	4	3	2	1	1

=== Manufacturers Cups ===
Manufacturer Cups were available only to designated manufacturers in the LMP1 and GT2 categories. Each manufacturer had to designate teams to represent them at each event, with points being allocated by combining the top two finishing representatives.

==== LMP1 ====
Peugeot won all three races for LMP1 cars thanks to the victories of Team Peugeot Total, defeating their only rivals Audi for the manufacturers' championship.

(key) (Races in bold indicate pole position) (Races in italics indicate fastest lap)

Pos.	Manufacturer		Chassis Engine	Tire	Car	Results			Points
Pos.	Manufacturer		Chassis Engine	Tire	Car	(United Kingdom) SIL	(United States) ATL	(China) ZHU	Points
1	(France)	Peugeot	Peugeot 908 HDi FAP; HDi 5.5 L Turbo V12 (diesel)	**M**	1st	1	1	**1**	140
1	(France)	Peugeot	Peugeot 908 HDi FAP; HDi 5.5 L Turbo V12 (diesel)	**M**	2nd	2	**2**	4	140
2	(Germany)	Audi	Audi R15 TDI plus TDI 5.5 L Turbo V10 (diesel)	**M**	1st	3	3	3	101
2	(Germany)	Audi	Audi R15 TDI plus TDI 5.5 L Turbo V10 (diesel)	**M**	2nd	**Ret**	5	2	101

==== GT2 ====
GT2 was the only other class to have two championships, with Ferrari edging out Porsche for the manufacturers' championship by seven points, taking two wins to Porsche's one.

(key) (Races in bold indicate pole position) (Races in italics indicate fastest lap)

Pos.	Manufacturer		Model	Tire	Car	Results			Points
Pos.	Manufacturer		Model	Tire	Car	(United Kingdom) SIL	(United States) ATL	(China) ZHU	Points
1	(Italy)	Ferrari	Ferrari F430 GT2	M	1st	1	3	**3**	120
1	(Italy)	Ferrari	Ferrari F430 GT2	M	2nd	4	**7**	5	120
2	(Germany)	Porsche	Porsche 997 GT3-RSR	M	1st	2	5	2	113
2	(Germany)	Porsche	Porsche 997 GT3-RSR	M	2nd	5	9	4	113
3	(Germany)	BMW	BMW M3 GT2	D	1st	8	4	1	69
3	(Germany)	BMW	BMW M3 GT2	D	2nd	-	13	-	69
4	(United Kingdom)	Jaguar	Jaguar XKRS	D	1st	-	Ret	Ret	0
4	(United Kingdom)	Jaguar	Jaguar XKRS	D	2nd	-	Ret	-	0

=== Team Cups ===
==== LMP1 ====
Team Peugeot Total claimed the Teams Cup, finishing 17 points clear of Audi Sport Team Joest, while Drayson Racing and Team Oreca Matmut also contested races.

(key) (Races in bold indicate pole position) (Races in italics indicate fastest lap)

Pos.	Team		Chassis Engine	Tire	No.	Results			Points	
Pos.	Team		Chassis Engine	Tire	No.	(United Kingdom) SIL	(United States) ATL	(China) ZHU	Car	Team
1	(France)	Team Peugeot Total	Peugeot 908 HDi FAP; HDi 5.5 L Turbo V12 (diesel)	M	1	1	**2**	4	67	118
1	(France)	Team Peugeot Total	Peugeot 908 HDi FAP; HDi 5.5 L Turbo V12 (diesel)	M	2	-	1	**1**	51	118
2	(Germany)	Audi Sport Team Joest	Audi R15 TDI plus TDI 5.5 L Turbo V10 (diesel)	M	8	3	5	3	58	101
2	(Germany)	Audi Sport Team Joest	Audi R15 TDI plus TDI 5.5 L Turbo V10 (diesel)	M	7	**Ret**	3	2	43	101
3	(United Kingdom)	Drayson Racing	Lola B09/60; Judd GV5.5 S2 5.5 L V10	M	11	8	6	-	32	32
4	(France)	Team Oreca Matmut	Peugeot 908 HDi FAP; HDi 5.5 L Turbo V12 (diesel)	M	4	2	-	-	22	22

==== LMP2 ====
The LMP2 team cup was settled comprehensively, as OAK Racing were the only team to compete in all three LMP2 races.

(key) (Races in bold indicate pole position) (Races in italics indicate fastest lap)

Pos.	Team		Chassis Engine	Tire	No.	Results			Points	
Pos.	Team		Chassis Engine	Tire	No.	(United Kingdom) SIL	(United States) ATL	(China) ZHU	Car	Team
1	(France)	OAK Racing; Team Mazda France	Pescarolo 01; Zytek ZG348 3.4 L V8	**D**	35	3	3	**1**	66	83
1	(France)	OAK Racing; Team Mazda France	Pescarolo 01; Zytek ZG348 3.4 L V8	**D**	24	6	-	-	17	83
2	(Italy)	MIK Corse; Racing Box	Lola B09/80; Judd DB 3.4 L V8	**D**	30	5	-	-	18	34
2	(Italy)	MIK Corse; Racing Box	Lola B09/80; Judd DB 3.4 L V8	**D**	29	7	-	-	16	34

==== GT1 ====
In the GT1 category, entries were received from Larbre Compétition and Atlas eFX-Team FS, but Atlas withdrew from all three ILMC events, automatically earning Larbre the title.

(key) (Races in bold indicate pole position) (Races in italics indicate fastest lap)

Pos.	Team		Car	Tire	No.	Results			Points	
Pos.	Team		Car	Tire	No.	(United Kingdom) SIL	(United States) ATL	(China) ZHU	Car	Team
1	(France)	Larbre Compétition	Saleen S7-R	**M**	50	**1**	-	**1**	51	51

==== GT2 ====
Porsche team Felbermayr-Proton upheld some honour for the marque, as they won the teams' championship despite not winning a race, fifteen points ahead of AF Corse, who won at Silverstone. Risi Competizione and BMW Team Schnitzer won the other races to be held.

(key) (Races in bold indicate pole position) (Races in italics indicate fastest lap)

Pos.	Team		Car	Tire	No.	Results			Points	
Pos.	Team		Car	Tire	No.	(United Kingdom) SIL	(United States) ATL	(China) ZHU	Car	Team
1	(Germany)	Team Felbermayr-Proton	Porsche 997 GT3-RSR	M	77	5	-	2	40	72
1	(Germany)	Team Felbermayr-Proton	Porsche 997 GT3-RSR	M	88	10	-	4	32	72
2	(Italy)	AF Corse SRL	Ferrari F430 GT2	M	95	12	-	**3**	33	57
2	(Italy)	AF Corse SRL	Ferrari F430 GT2	M	96	1	-	-	25	57
3	(United Kingdom)	CRS Racing	Ferrari F430 GT2	M	91	4	-	5	37	47
3	(United Kingdom)	CRS Racing	Ferrari F430 GT2	M	90	13	-	-	10	47
4	(Germany)	BMW Team Schnitzer	BMW M3 GT2	D	78	8	-	1	40	40
5	(United States)	Risi Competizione	Ferrari F430 GT2	M	62	-	3	-	22	37
5	(United States)	Risi Competizione	Ferrari F430 GT2	M	61	-	7	-	16	37
6	(United States)	Flying Lizard Motorsports	Porsche 997 GT3-RSR	M	14	-	5	-	18	32
6	(United States)	Flying Lizard Motorsports	Porsche 997 GT3-RSR	M	44	-	9	-	14	32
7	(United States)	BMW Rahal Letterman Racing	BMW M3 GT2	D	92	-	4	-	19	29
7	(United States)	BMW Rahal Letterman Racing	BMW M3 GT2	D	90	-	13	-	10	29
8	(United Arab Emirates)	Gulf Team First	Lamborghini Murciélago	D	99	11	-	6	12	29
9	(Belgium)	Prospeed Competition	Porsche 997 GT3-RSR	M	75	2	-	Ret	22	22
10	(United States)	JaguarRSR	Jaguar XKRS	Y	81	-	Ret	Ret	0	0
10	(United States)	JaguarRSR	Jaguar XKRS	Y	33	-	Ret	-	0	0
