= 2010 Petit Le Mans =

Sportscar endurance race in Georgia, US

The Track map of Road Atlanta

The 13th Annual Petit Le Mans powered by Mazda2 was the 13th running of the Petit Le Mans and the final round of the 2010 American Le Mans Series season. The event also served as the second and penultimate round of the 2010 Intercontinental Le Mans Cup. It took place at Road Atlanta, Georgia on October 2, 2010.

== Qualifying ==
=== Qualifying result ===
Pole position winners in each class are marked in bold.

Pos	Class	Team	Driver	Lap Time	Grid
1	**LMP1**	**#07 Team Peugeot Total**	**Anthony Davidson**	**1:07.187**	**1**
2	LMP1	#08 Team Peugeot Total	Pedro Lamy	1:07.409	2
3	LMP1	#9 Audi Sport Team Joest	Benoît Tréluyer	1:07.610	3
4	LMP1	#7 Audi Sport Team Joest	Rinaldo Capello	1:08.112	4
5	LMP1	#37 Intersport Racing	Jon Field	1:10.128	5
6	**LMP2**	**#16 Dyson Racing Team**	**Guy Smith**	**1:10.417**	**6**
7	LMP2	#6 Muscle Milk Team Cytosport	Klaus Graf	1:10.548	7
8	LMP2	#1 Patrón Highcroft Racing	David Brabham	1:10.661	8
9	LMP1	#12 Autocon Motorsports	Chris McMurry	1:14.109	9
10	**LMPC**	**#52 PR1 Mathiasen Motorsports**	**Luis Díaz**	**1:15.296**	**10**
11	LMPC	#99 Green Earth Team Gunnar	Gunnar Jeannette	1:15.525	40
12	LMPC	#89 Intersport Racing	Kyle Marcelli	1:15.610	11
13	LMP2	#35 OAK Racing	Jacques Nicolet	1:15.989	12
14	LMPC	#36 Genoa Racing	Frankie Montecalvo	1:16.250	13
15	LMPC	#55 Level 5 Motorsports	Christophe Bouchut	1:16.483	14
16	LMPC	#95 Level 5 Motorsports	Scott Tucker	1:18.342	15
17	**GT2**	**#61 Risi Competizione**	**Jaime Melo**	**1:19.889**	**16**
18	GT2	#62 Risi Competizione	Gianmaria Bruni	1:20.070	17
19	GT2	#02 Extreme Speed Motorsports	Guy Cosmo	1:20.165	18
20	GT2	#01 Extreme Speed Motorsports	Johannes van Overbeek	1:20.185	19
21	GT2	#90 BMW Rahal Letterman Racing	Dirk Müller	1:20.322	20
22	GT2	#4 Corvette Racing	Jan Magnussen	1:20.598	21
23	GT2	#3 Corvette Racing	Olivier Beretta	1:20.675	22
24	GT2	#45 Flying Lizard Motorsports	Patrick Long	1:20.768	23
25	GT2	#04 Robertson Racing	David Murry	1:20.777	24
26	GT2	#92 BMW Rahal Letterman Racing	Bill Auberlen	1:20.812	25
27	GT2	#17 Team Falken Tire	Bryan Sellers	1:21.560	26
28	GT2	#40 Robertson Racing	Craig Stanton	1:21.619	27
29	LMP2	#5 Libra Racing	Andrew Prendeville	1:21.820	28
30	GT2	#75 Jaguar RSR	Marc Goossens	1:22.898	29
31	GT2	#44 Flying Lizard Motorsports	Seth Neiman	1:24.887	30
32	**GTC**	**#54 Black Swan Racing**	**Jeroen Bleekemolen**	**1:25.141**	**31**
33	GTC	#63 TRG	Andy Lally	1:25.364	32
34	GTC	#77 Magnus Racing	Andrew Davis	1:25.482	33
35	GTC	#88 Velox Motorsports	Shane Lewis	1:25.746	34
36	GTC	#23 Alex Job Racing	Bill Sweedler	1:26.300	35
37	GTC	#69 WERKS II Racing	Galen Bieker	1:26.628	36
38	GTC	#48 Paul Miller Racing	Bryce Miller	1:26.874	37
39	GTC	#28 911 Design	Doug Baron	1:27.713	38
40	LMP1	#8 Drayson Racing	No Time		39
41	GT2	#33 Jaguar RSR	No Time		41
42	GTH	#911 Porsche Motorsports North America	No Time		42
43	GT2	#10 ACS Express Racing	No Time		43

== Race ==
=== Race result ===
Class winners marked in bold.

Pos	Class	No	Team	Drivers	Chassis	Tire	Laps
Pos	Class	No	Team	Drivers	Engine	Tire	Laps
1	**LMP1**	**08**	**(France) Team Peugeot Total**	**(France) Franck Montagny (France) Stéphane Sarrazin (Portugal) Pedro Lamy**	**Peugeot 908 HDi FAP**	M	**394**
1	**LMP1**	**08**	**(France) Team Peugeot Total**	**(France) Franck Montagny (France) Stéphane Sarrazin (Portugal) Pedro Lamy**	**Peugeot HDi 5.5 L Turbo V12 (Diesel)**	M	**394**
2	LMP1	07	(France) Team Peugeot Total	(United Kingdom) Anthony Davidson (Spain) Marc Gené (Austria) Alexander Wurz	Peugeot 908 HDi FAP	M	394
2	LMP1	07	(France) Team Peugeot Total	(United Kingdom) Anthony Davidson (Spain) Marc Gené (Austria) Alexander Wurz	Peugeot HDi 5.5 L Turbo V12 (Diesel)	M	394
3	LMP1	7	(Germany) Audi Sport Team Joest	(Denmark) Tom Kristensen (United Kingdom) Allan McNish (Italy) Rinaldo Capello	Audi R15 TDI plus	M	392
3	LMP1	7	(Germany) Audi Sport Team Joest	(Denmark) Tom Kristensen (United Kingdom) Allan McNish (Italy) Rinaldo Capello	Audi TDI 5.5 L Turbo V10 (Diesel)	M	392
4	**LMP2**	**1**	**(United States) Patrón Highcroft Racing**	**(Australia) David Brabham (France) Simon Pagenaud (United Kingdom) Marino Franchitti**	**HPD ARX-01C**	M	**383**
4	**LMP2**	**1**	**(United States) Patrón Highcroft Racing**	**(Australia) David Brabham (France) Simon Pagenaud (United Kingdom) Marino Franchitti**	**HPD AL7R 3.4 L V8**	M	**383**
5	LMP1	37	(United States) Intersport Racing	(United States) Jon Field (United States) Clint Field (United Kingdom) Ben Devlin	Lola B06/10	D	383
5	LMP1	37	(United States) Intersport Racing	(United States) Jon Field (United States) Clint Field (United Kingdom) Ben Devlin	AER P32T 4.0 L Turbo V8	D	383
6	LMP1	9	(Germany) Audi Sport Team Joest	(Switzerland) Marcel Fässler (Germany) André Lotterer (France) Benoît Tréluyer	Audi R15 TDI plus	M	377
6	LMP1	9	(Germany) Audi Sport Team Joest	(Switzerland) Marcel Fässler (Germany) André Lotterer (France) Benoît Tréluyer	Audi TDI 5.5 L Turbo V10 (Diesel)	M	377
7	LMP2	6	(United States) Muscle Milk Team Cytosport	(Germany) Klaus Graf (Germany) Lucas Luhr (Germany) Sascha Maassen	Porsche RS Spyder Evo	M	372
7	LMP2	6	(United States) Muscle Milk Team Cytosport	(Germany) Klaus Graf (Germany) Lucas Luhr (Germany) Sascha Maassen	Porsche MR6 3.4 L V8	M	372
8	LMP1	8	(United Kingdom) Drayson Racing	(United Kingdom) Paul Drayson (United Kingdom) Jonny Cocker (Italy) Emanuele Pirro	Lola B09/60	M	369
8	LMP1	8	(United Kingdom) Drayson Racing	(United Kingdom) Paul Drayson (United Kingdom) Jonny Cocker (Italy) Emanuele Pirro	Judd GV5.5 S2 5.5 L V10	M	369
9	LMP2	35	(France) OAK Racing	(France) Jacques Nicolet (France) Frédéric da Rocha (France) Patrice Lafargue	Pescarolo 01	D	359
9	LMP2	35	(France) OAK Racing	(France) Jacques Nicolet (France) Frédéric da Rocha (France) Patrice Lafargue	Judd DB 3.4 L V8	D	359
10	**GT2**	**4**	**(United States) Corvette Racing**	**(United Kingdom) Oliver Gavin (Denmark) Jan Magnussen (France) Emmanuel Collard**	**Chevrolet Corvette C6.R**	M	**355**
10	**GT2**	**4**	**(United States) Corvette Racing**	**(United Kingdom) Oliver Gavin (Denmark) Jan Magnussen (France) Emmanuel Collard**	**Chevrolet 5.5 L V8**	M	**355**
11	GT2	01	(United States) Extreme Speed Motorsports	(United States) Scott Sharp (United States) Johannes van Overbeek (Germany) Dominik Farnbacher	Ferrari F430 GTE	M	355
11	GT2	01	(United States) Extreme Speed Motorsports	(United States) Scott Sharp (United States) Johannes van Overbeek (Germany) Dominik Farnbacher	Ferrari 4.0 L V8	M	355
12	GT2	62	(United States) Risi Competizione	(Finland) Toni Vilander (Italy) Gianmaria Bruni	Ferrari F430 GTE	M	354
12	GT2	62	(United States) Risi Competizione	(Finland) Toni Vilander (Italy) Gianmaria Bruni	Ferrari 4.0 L V8	M	354
13	GT2	92	(United States) BMW Rahal Letterman Racing	(United States) Bill Auberlen (United States) Tommy Milner (Germany) Dirk Werner	BMW M3 GT2	D	354
13	GT2	92	(United States) BMW Rahal Letterman Racing	(United States) Bill Auberlen (United States) Tommy Milner (Germany) Dirk Werner	BMW 4.0 L V8	D	354
14	GT2	45	(United States) Flying Lizard Motorsports	(United States) Patrick Long (Germany) Jörg Bergmeister (Germany) Marc Lieb	Porsche 997 GT3-RSR	M	354
14	GT2	45	(United States) Flying Lizard Motorsports	(United States) Patrick Long (Germany) Jörg Bergmeister (Germany) Marc Lieb	Porsche 4.0 L Flat-6	M	354
15	GT2	3	(United States) Corvette Racing	(United States) Johnny O'Connell (Monaco) Olivier Beretta (Spain) Antonio García	Chevrolet Corvette C6.R	M	354
15	GT2	3	(United States) Corvette Racing	(United States) Johnny O'Connell (Monaco) Olivier Beretta (Spain) Antonio García	Chevrolet 5.5 L V8	M	354
16	**LMPC**	**95**	**(United States) Level 5 Motorsports**	**(United States) Scott Tucker (United States) Burt Frisselle (Germany) Marco Werner**	**Oreca FLM09**	M	**354**
16	**LMPC**	**95**	**(United States) Level 5 Motorsports**	**(United States) Scott Tucker (United States) Burt Frisselle (Germany) Marco Werner**	**Chevrolet 6.2 L V8**	M	**354**
17	GT2	61	(United States) Risi Competizione	(Italy) Giancarlo Fisichella (Brazil) Jaime Melo (Finland) Mika Salo	Ferrari F430 GTE	M	353
17	GT2	61	(United States) Risi Competizione	(Italy) Giancarlo Fisichella (Brazil) Jaime Melo (Finland) Mika Salo	Ferrari 4.0 L V8	M	353
18	GTH	911	(United States) Porsche Motorsports North America	(Germany) Mike Rockenfeller (Germany) Timo Bernhard (France) Romain Dumas	Porsche 911 GT3-R Hybrid	M	350
18	GTH	911	(United States) Porsche Motorsports North America	(Germany) Mike Rockenfeller (Germany) Timo Bernhard (France) Romain Dumas	Porsche 4.0 L Hybrid Flat-6	M	350
19	GT2	04	(United States) Robertson Racing	(United States) David Murry (United States) Anthony Lazzaro (United Kingdom) Rob Bell	Ford GT-R Mk. VII	D	349
19	GT2	04	(United States) Robertson Racing	(United States) David Murry (United States) Anthony Lazzaro (United Kingdom) Rob Bell	Ford 5.0 L V8	D	349
20	GT2	44	(United States) Flying Lizard Motorsports	(United States) Darren Law (United States) Seth Neiman (Germany) Marco Holzer	Porsche 997 GT3-RSR	M	348
20	GT2	44	(United States) Flying Lizard Motorsports	(United States) Darren Law (United States) Seth Neiman (Germany) Marco Holzer	Porsche 4.0 L Flat-6	M	348
21	GT2	17	(United States) Team Falken Tire	(United States) Bryan Sellers (Austria) Martin Ragginger	Porsche 997 GT3-RSR	F	347
21	GT2	17	(United States) Team Falken Tire	(United States) Bryan Sellers (Austria) Martin Ragginger	Porsche 4.0 L Flat-6	F	347
22	**GTC**	**63**	**(United States) TRG**	**(France) Henri Richard (United States) Andy Lally (United States) Duncan Ende**	**Porsche 997 GT3 Cup**	Y	**337**
22	**GTC**	**63**	**(United States) TRG**	**(France) Henri Richard (United States) Andy Lally (United States) Duncan Ende**	**Porsche 3.8 L Flat-6**	Y	**337**
23	GTC	54	(United States) Black Swan Racing	(United States) Tim Pappas (Netherlands) Jeroen Bleekemolen (Netherlands) Sebastiaan Bleekemolen	Porsche 997 GT3 Cup	Y	337
23	GTC	54	(United States) Black Swan Racing	(United States) Tim Pappas (Netherlands) Jeroen Bleekemolen (Netherlands) Sebastiaan Bleekemolen	Porsche 3.8 L Flat-6	Y	337
24	LMPC	89	(United States) Intersport Racing	(Canada) Kyle Marcelli (United States) Chapman Ducote (United States) David Ducote	Oreca FLM09	M	336
24	LMPC	89	(United States) Intersport Racing	(Canada) Kyle Marcelli (United States) Chapman Ducote (United States) David Ducote	Chevrolet 6.2 L V8	M	336
25	GTC	77	(United States) Magnus Racing	(United States) John Potter (United States) Andrew Davis (United States) Ryan Eversley	Porsche 997 GT3 Cup	Y	332
25	GTC	77	(United States) Magnus Racing	(United States) John Potter (United States) Andrew Davis (United States) Ryan Eversley	Porsche 3.8 L Flat-6	Y	332
26	GTC	88	(United States) Velox Racing	(United States) Shane Lewis (United States) Jerry Vento (United States) Lawson Aschenbach	Porsche 997 GT3 Cup	Y	330
26	GTC	88	(United States) Velox Racing	(United States) Shane Lewis (United States) Jerry Vento (United States) Lawson Aschenbach	Porsche 3.8 L Flat-6	Y	330
27	GT2	02	(United States) Extreme Speed Motorsports	(United States) Ed Brown (United States) Guy Cosmo (Portugal) João Barbosa	Ferrari F430 GTE	M	329
27	GT2	02	(United States) Extreme Speed Motorsports	(United States) Ed Brown (United States) Guy Cosmo (Portugal) João Barbosa	Ferrari 4.0 L V8	M	329
28	GTC	28	(United States) 911 Design	(United States) Loren Beggs (United States) Doug Baron (Canada) René Villeneuve	Porsche 997 GT3 Cup	Y	325
28	GTC	28	(United States) 911 Design	(United States) Loren Beggs (United States) Doug Baron (Canada) René Villeneuve	Porsche 3.8 L Flat-6	Y	325
29	GTC	69	(United States) WERKS II Racing	(United States) Galen Bieker (United States) Robert Rodriguez	Porsche 997 GT3 Cup	Y	324
29	GTC	69	(United States) WERKS II Racing	(United States) Galen Bieker (United States) Robert Rodriguez	Porsche 3.8 L Flat-6	Y	324
30	GT2	40	(United States) Robertson Racing	(United States) David Robertson (United States) Andrea Robertson (United States) Craig Stanton	Ford GT-R Mk. VII	D	315
30	GT2	40	(United States) Robertson Racing	(United States) David Robertson (United States) Andrea Robertson (United States) Craig Stanton	Ford 5.0 L V8	D	315
31	GT2	90	(United States) BMW Rahal Letterman Racing	(Germany) Dirk Müller (United States) Joey Hand (United Kingdom) Andy Priaulx	BMW M3 GT2	D	315
31	GT2	90	(United States) BMW Rahal Letterman Racing	(Germany) Dirk Müller (United States) Joey Hand (United Kingdom) Andy Priaulx	BMW 4.0 L V8	D	315
32	LMPC	52	(United States) PR1 Mathiasen Motorsports	(Mexico) Ricardo González (Mexico) Luis Díaz (United Kingdom) Ryan Lewis	Oreca FLM09	M	311
32	LMPC	52	(United States) PR1 Mathiasen Motorsports	(Mexico) Ricardo González (Mexico) Luis Díaz (United Kingdom) Ryan Lewis	Chevrolet 6.2 L V8	M	311
33	GTC	23	(United States) Alex Job Racing	(United States) Romeo Kapudija (United States) Bill Sweedler (Germany) Jan-Dirk Leuders	Porsche 997 GT3 Cup	Y	310
33	GTC	23	(United States) Alex Job Racing	(United States) Romeo Kapudija (United States) Bill Sweedler (Germany) Jan-Dirk Leuders	Porsche 3.8 L Flat-6	Y	310
34	LMPC	55	(United States) Level 5 Motorsports	(United States) Scott Tucker (France) Christophe Bouchut (Canada) Mark Wilkins	Oreca FLM09	M	310
34	LMPC	55	(United States) Level 5 Motorsports	(United States) Scott Tucker (France) Christophe Bouchut (Canada) Mark Wilkins	Chevrolet 6.2 L V8	M	310
35	LMPC	36	(United States) Genoa Racing	(United States) Eric Lux (United States) Frankie Montecalvo (United States) Alex Figge	Oreca FLM09	M	307
35	LMPC	36	(United States) Genoa Racing	(United States) Eric Lux (United States) Frankie Montecalvo (United States) Alex Figge	Chevrolet 6.2 L V8	M	307
36	LMPC	99	(United States) Green Earth Team Gunnar	(United States) Gunnar Jeannette (United States) Christian Zugel (United States) Elton Julian	Oreca FLM09	M	287
36	LMPC	99	(United States) Green Earth Team Gunnar	(United States) Gunnar Jeannette (United States) Christian Zugel (United States) Elton Julian	Chevrolet 6.2 L V8	M	287
37 DNF	LMP2	16	(United States) Dyson Racing Team	(United States) Chris Dyson (United Kingdom) Guy Smith (United Kingdom) Andy Meyrick	Lola B09/86	D	192
37 DNF	LMP2	16	(United States) Dyson Racing Team	(United States) Chris Dyson (United Kingdom) Guy Smith (United Kingdom) Andy Meyrick	Mazda MZR-R 2.0 L Turbo I4 (Butanol)	D	192
38 DNF	LMP1	12	(United States) Autocon Motorsports	(United States) Bryan Willman (United States) Chris McMurry (Canada) Tony Burgess	Lola B06/10	D	157
38 DNF	LMP1	12	(United States) Autocon Motorsports	(United States) Bryan Willman (United States) Chris McMurry (Canada) Tony Burgess	AER P32T 4.0 L Turbo V8	D	157
39 DNF	GT2	75	(United States) Jaguar RSR	(United States) Paul Gentilozzi (Belgium) Marc Goossens (United Kingdom) Ryan Dalziel	Jaguar XKRS	Y	82
39 DNF	GT2	75	(United States) Jaguar RSR	(United States) Paul Gentilozzi (Belgium) Marc Goossens (United Kingdom) Ryan Dalziel	Jaguar 5.0 L V8	Y	82
40 DNF	GT2	33	(United States) Jaguar RSR	(United Kingdom) Andy Wallace (United States) Butch Leitzinger (United States) Tomy Drissi	Jaguar XKRS	Y	16
40 DNF	GT2	33	(United States) Jaguar RSR	(United Kingdom) Andy Wallace (United States) Butch Leitzinger (United States) Tomy Drissi	Jaguar 5.0 L V8	Y	16
41 DNF	LMP2	5	(United Kingdom) Libra Racing	(United States) Andrew Prendeville (Finland) Harri Toivonen (Republic of Ireland) Peter Dempsey	Radical SR9	D	6
41 DNF	LMP2	5	(United Kingdom) Libra Racing	(United States) Andrew Prendeville (Finland) Harri Toivonen (Republic of Ireland) Peter Dempsey	Nissan 4.0 L V8	D	6
DNS	GTC	48	(United States) Paul Miller Racing	(United States) Bryce Miller (United Kingdom) Luke Hines (Germany) Pierre Ehret	Porsche 997 GT3 Cup	Y	–
DNS	GTC	48	(United States) Paul Miller Racing	(United States) Bryce Miller (United Kingdom) Luke Hines (Germany) Pierre Ehret	Porsche 3.8 L Flat-6	Y	–
DNS	LMPC	73	(United States) Intersport Racing	(United States) Antonio Downs (United States) Matt Downs (United States) Lucas Downs	Oreca FLM09	M	–
DNS	LMPC	73	(United States) Intersport Racing	(United States) Antonio Downs (United States) Matt Downs (United States) Lucas Downs	Chevrolet 6.2 L V8	M	–
DNS	GT2	10	(United States) ACS Express Racing	(United States) Brandon Davis (United States) Boris Said (United States) Townsend Bell	Ford GT-R Mk. VII	M	–
DNS	GT2	10	(United States) ACS Express Racing	(United States) Brandon Davis (United States) Boris Said (United States) Townsend Bell	Ford 5.0 L V8	M	–

American Le Mans Series
Previous race: Grand Prix of Mosport	2010 season	Next race: none
Intercontinental Le Mans Cup
Previous race: 1000 km of Silverstone	2010 season	Next race: 1000 km of Zhuhai
