= Peugeot 908 RC =

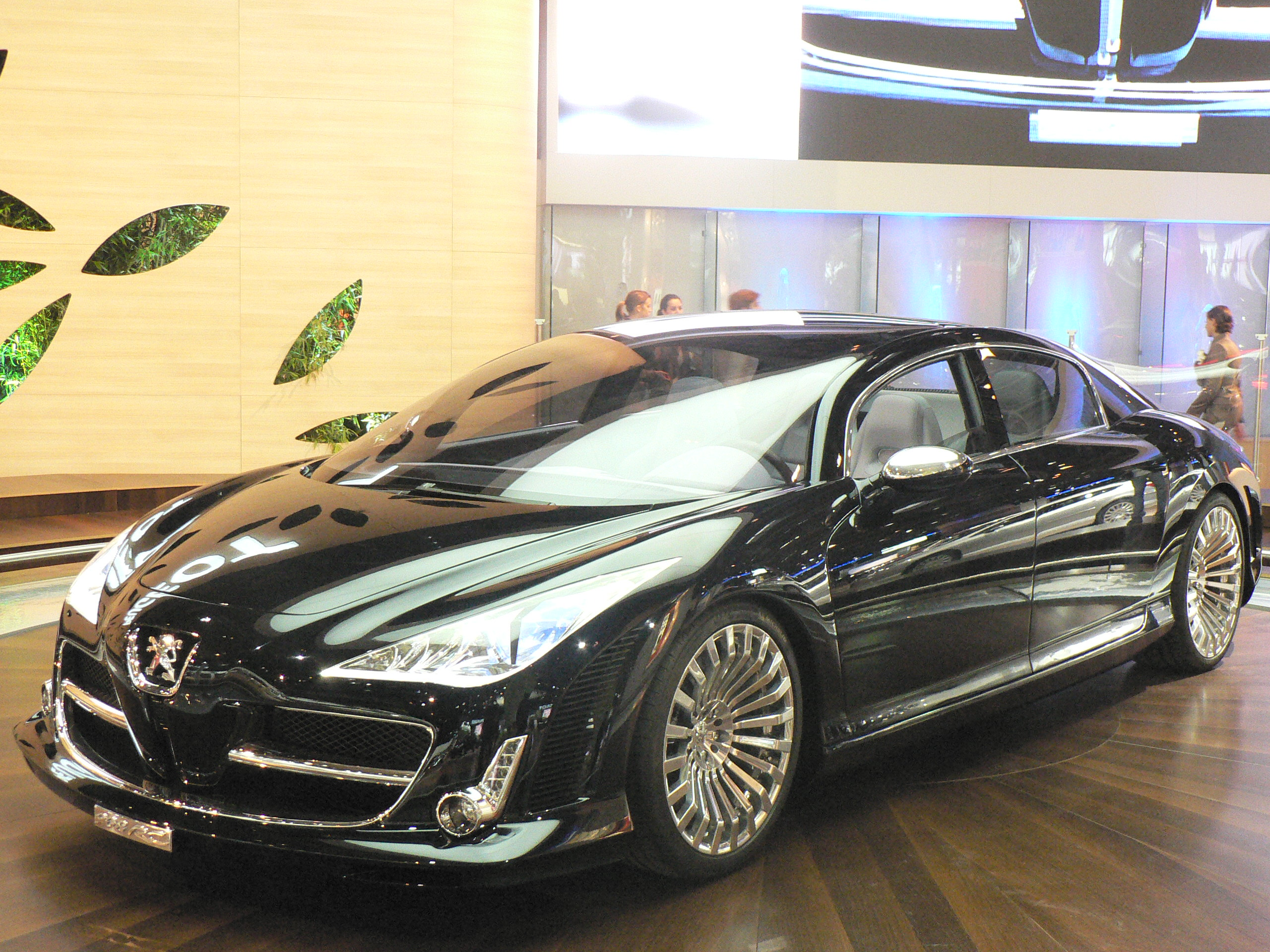

Overview
- Manufacturer: Peugeot
- Production: 2006 (concept car)

Body and chassis
- Class: Concept car
- Body style: 4-door sedan 4/5 seats
- Layout: Transverse rear mid-engine, rear-wheel drive

Powertrain
- Engine: 5.5L PSA HDi V12 HDi (twin turbo diesel)
- Transmission: 6-speed (electronically controlled sequential)

Dimensions
- Wheelbase: 3,150 mm (124.0 in)
- Length: 5,123 mm (201.7 in)
- Width: 1,935 mm (76.2 in) (?)
- Height: 1,370 mm (53.9 in)

The Peugeot 908 RC was a concept car that was produced by the French car manufacturer Peugeot, and was first shown to the public at the 2006 Paris Motor Show. The first official pictures of the 908 RC were released in August 2006.

The 908 RC was a luxury, four-door limousine powered by the 5.5L V12 HDi diesel, taken from the 908 HDi FAP, that was installed centrally and transversally, producing 700 bhp (522 kW; 710 PS), 1,200 N⋅m (885 lb⋅ft) torque and with a claimed top speed of 186 mph (299.3 km/h). The 908 RC was fitted with a six-speed sequential gearbox, with power to the rear wheels.

The 908 RC sat on a long 3,150 mm (124 in) wheelbase, had a length of 5,123 mm (201.7 in), and was 1,370 mm (54 in) high. The suspension was front and rear drop link with double wishbone suspension, while the brakes were carbon ceramic discs, made by Brembo.

== Gallery ==
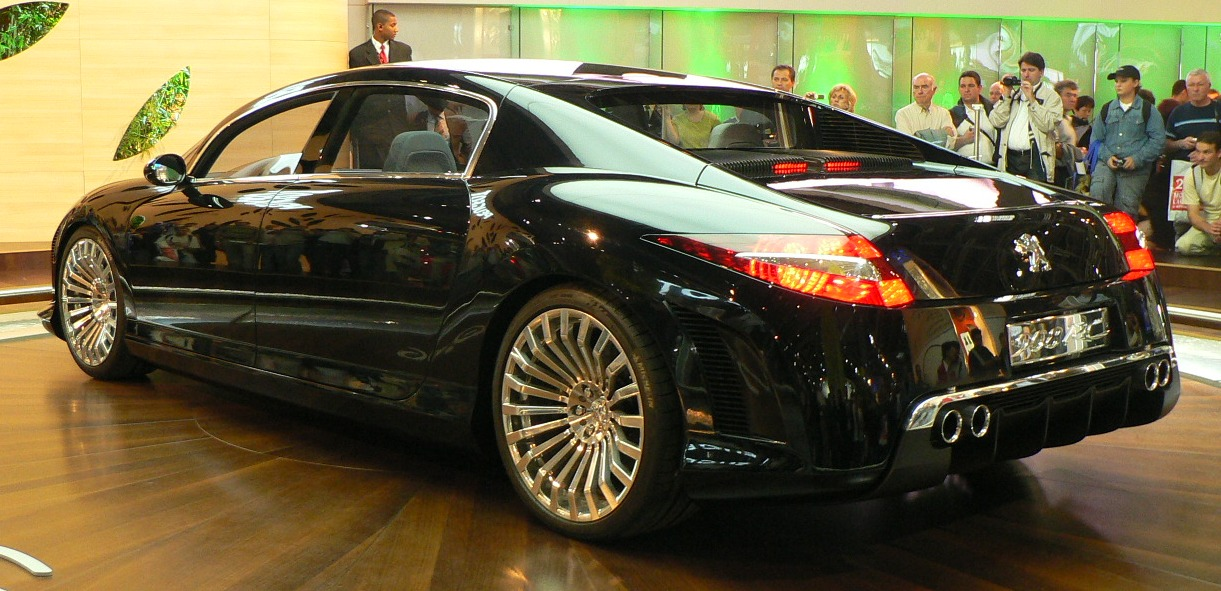
908 RC (rear view)

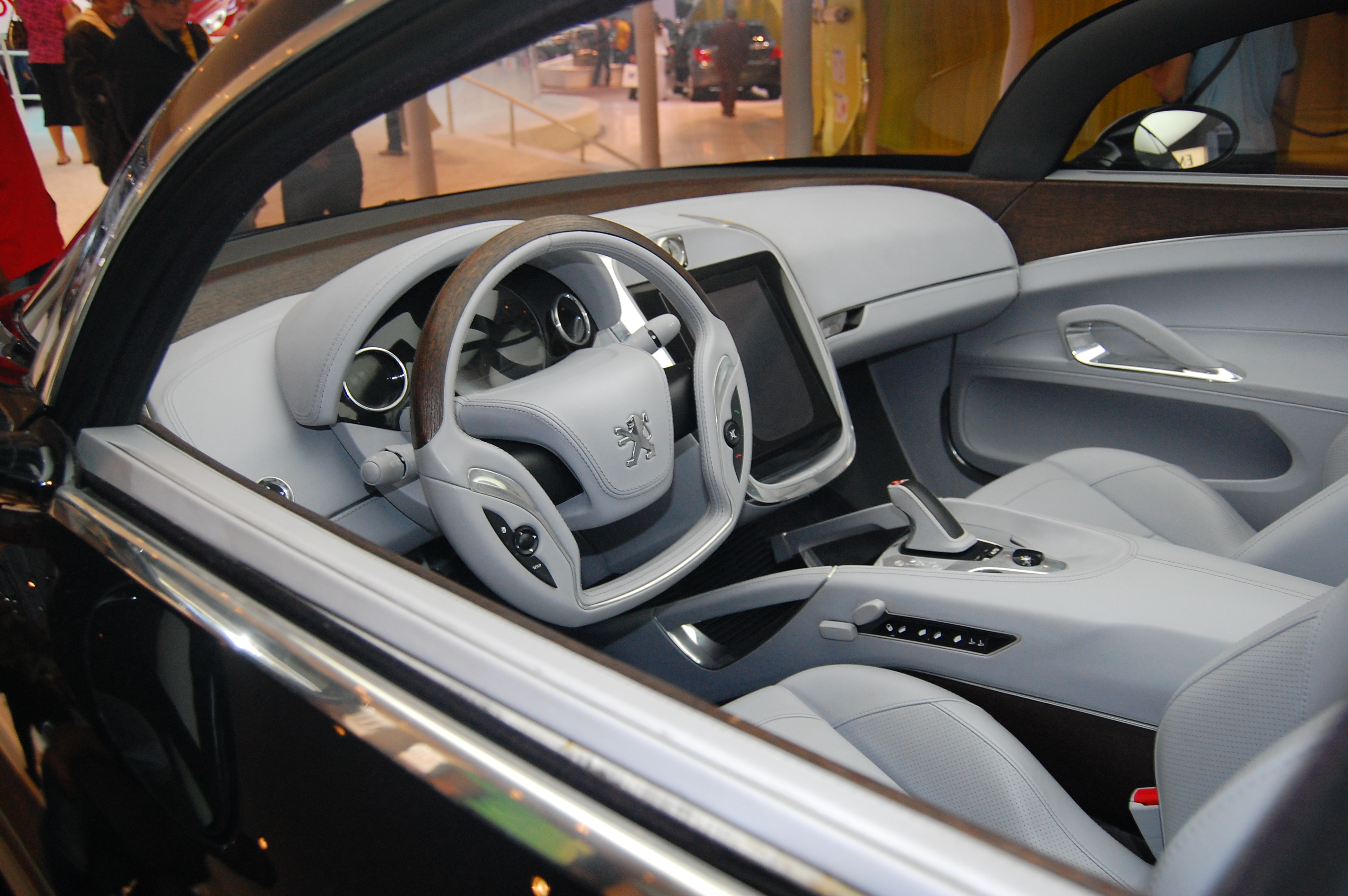
Interior
