= 2010 1000 km of Silverstone =

The Silverstone Circuit

The 2010 Autosport 1000 km of Silverstone was the fifth and final round of the 2010 Le Mans Series season and the inaugural race of the Intercontinental Le Mans Cup. It took place at Silverstone Circuit on 12 September. Manufacturers in the LMP1 and GT2 categories were eligible to compete for points in the ILMC, and designated teams in all categories except Formula Le Mans also competed for an ILMC title.

This was the first time the LMS cars use the new, longer "Arena" configuration introduced earlier this year; it was scheduled to run 170 laps opposed to the 195 in the previous races that was run in what is today known as the "Bridge" circuit.

== Qualifying ==
=== Qualifying result ===
Pole position winners in each class are marked in bold.

Pos	Class	Team	Driver	Lap Time	Grid
1*	**LMP1**	**No. 7 Audi Sport Team Joest**	**Allan McNish**	**1:43.475**	**1**
2*	LMP1	No. 8 Audi Sport Team Joest	Timo Bernhard	1:44.012	2
3*	LMP1	No. 1 Team Peugeot Total	Nicolas Minassian	1:44.489	3
4*	LMP1	No. 4 Team Oreca Matmut	Nicolas Lapierre	1:44.510	4
5	LMP1	No. 13 Rebellion Racing	Andrea Belicchi	1:45.731	5
6	LMP1	No. 009 Aston Martin Racing	Stefan Mücke	1:45.911	6
7*	LMP1	No. 11 Drayson Racing	Jonny Cocker	1:46.259	7
8	LMP1	No. 12 Rebellion Racing	Neel Jani	1:46.451	8
9	LMP1	No. 008 Signature-Plus	Franck Mailleux	1:46.482	9
10	**LMP2**	**No. 42 Strakka Racing**	**Danny Watts**	**1:46.961**	**10**
11	LMP1	No. 5 Beechdean-Mansell	Greg Mansell	1:47.421	11
12	LMP1	No. 20 Team LNT	Johnny Mowlem	1:48.509	12
13	LMP2	No. 40 Quifel-ASM Team	Olivier Pla	1:49.538	13
14	LMP2	No. 41 Team Bruichladdich	Thor-Christian Ebbesvik	1:50.374	14
15	LMP2	No. 25 RML	Thomas Erdos	1:51.221	15
16*	LMP2	No. 24 OAK Racing	Matthieu Lahaye	1:51.625	16
17*	LMP2	No. 30 Racing Box	Federico Leo	1:52.792	17
18*	LMP2	No. 29 Racing Box	Marco Cioci	1:53.365	18
19	LMP2	No. 39 KSM	Jonathan Kennard	1:53.410	19
20	LMP2	No. 31 RLR msport	Rob Garofall	1:54.013	20
21	LMP2	No. 36 Pegasus Racing	Julien Schell	1:55.674	21
22	LMP2	No. 27 Race Performance	Michel Frey	1:56.596	22
23	**FLM**	**No. 48 Hope Polevision Racing**	**Charlie Hollings**	**1:56.968**	**23**
24	LMP2	No. 47 Hope Polevision Racing	Steve Zacchia	1:57.057	24
25	FLM	No. 44 DAMS	Warren Hughes	1:57.312	25
26	FLM	No. 45 Boutsen Energy Racing	Dominik Kraihamer	1:57.850	25
27	FLM	No. 43 DAMS	Andrea Barlesi	1:59.443	27
28*	**GT1**	**No. 50 Larbre Compétition**	**Patrice Goueslard**	**2:02.640**	**28**
29	**GT2**	**No. 92 JMW Motorsport**	**Rob Bell**	**2:03.340**	**29**
30*	GT2	No. 95 AF Corse	Toni Vilander	2:03.499	30
31*	GT2	No. 77 Team Felbermayr-Proton	Marc Lieb	2:03.643	31
32*	GT2	No. 96 AF Corse	Jaime Melo	2:03.728	32
33*	GT2	No. 75 Prospeed Competition	Richard Westbrook	2:03.759	33
34	GT2	No. 89 Hankook Team Farnbacher	Allan Simonsen	2:03.840	34
35*	GT2	No. 88 Team Felbermayr-Proton	Martin Ragginger	2:03.862	35
36	GT2	No. 85 Spyker Squadron	Peter Dumbreck	2:03.877	36
37	GT2	No. 94 AF Corse	Matías Russo	2:04.027	37
38*−	GT2	No. 78 BMW Team Schnitzer	Dirk Werner	2:04.475	38
39	GT2	No. 76 IMSA Performance Matmut	Patrick Pilet	2:04.595	39
40*	GT2	No. 91 CRS Racing	Andrew Kirkaldy	2:04.818	40
41	FLM	No. 46 JMB Racing	Maurice Basso	2:05.402	41
42*	GT2	No. 90 CRS Racing	Pierre Kaffer	2:05.481	42
43*	GT2	No. 99 Gulf Team First	Fabien Giroix	2:08.916	43
44	LMP1	No . 007 Aston Martin Racing	No Time		44
45*	LMP2	No. 35 OAK Racing	No Time		45

Note that ILMC competitors are marked with an asterisk (*).

== Race ==
=== Race result ===
Class winners in bold. Cars failing to complete 70% of winner's distance marked as Not Classified (NC).

Pos	Class	No	Team	Drivers	Chassis	Tyre	Laps
Pos	Class	No	Team	Drivers	Engine	Tyre	Laps
1	**LMP1**	**1**	**(France) Team Peugeot Total**	**(France) Nicolas Minassian (United Kingdom) Anthony Davidson**	**Peugeot 908 HDi FAP**	MI	**170**
1	**LMP1**	**1**	**(France) Team Peugeot Total**	**(France) Nicolas Minassian (United Kingdom) Anthony Davidson**	**Peugeot HDi 5.5 L Turbo V12 (Diesel)**	MI	**170**
2	LMP1	4	(France) Team Oreca Matmut	(France) Nicolas Lapierre (France) Stéphane Sarrazin	Peugeot 908 HDi FAP	MI	170
2	LMP1	4	(France) Team Oreca Matmut	(France) Nicolas Lapierre (France) Stéphane Sarrazin	Peugeot HDi 5.5 L Turbo V12 (Diesel)	MI	170
3	LMP1	8	(Germany) Audi Sport Team Joest	(Italy) Rinaldo Capello (Germany) Timo Bernhard	Audi R15 TDI plus	MI	170
3	LMP1	8	(Germany) Audi Sport Team Joest	(Italy) Rinaldo Capello (Germany) Timo Bernhard	Audi TDI 5.5 L Turbo V10 (Diesel)	MI	170
4	LMP1	009	(United Kingdom) Aston Martin Racing	(United Kingdom) Sam Hancock (Denmark) Juan Barazi (Germany) Stefan Mücke	Lola-Aston Martin B09/60	MI	167
4	LMP1	009	(United Kingdom) Aston Martin Racing	(United Kingdom) Sam Hancock (Denmark) Juan Barazi (Germany) Stefan Mücke	Aston Martin AM04 6.0 L V12	MI	167
5	LMP1	12	(Switzerland) Rebellion Racing	(Switzerland) Neel Jani (France) Nicolas Prost	Lola B10/60	MI	165
5	LMP1	12	(Switzerland) Rebellion Racing	(Switzerland) Neel Jani (France) Nicolas Prost	Rebellion (Judd) 5.5 L V10	MI	165
6	LMP1	008	(France) Signature-Plus	(France) Pierre Ragues (France) Franck Mailleux (Belgium) Vanina Ickx	Lola-Aston Martin B09/60	D	164
6	LMP1	008	(France) Signature-Plus	(France) Pierre Ragues (France) Franck Mailleux (Belgium) Vanina Ickx	Aston Martin AM04 6.0 L V12	D	164
7	LMP1	5	(United Kingdom) Beechdean Mansell	(United Kingdom) Greg Mansell (United Kingdom) Leo Mansell	Ginetta-Zytek GZ09S	D	161
7	LMP1	5	(United Kingdom) Beechdean Mansell	(United Kingdom) Greg Mansell (United Kingdom) Leo Mansell	Zytek ZG458 4.5 L V8	D	161
8	**LMP2**	**42**	**(United Kingdom) Strakka Racing**	**(United Kingdom) Danny Watts (United Kingdom) Nick Leventis (United Kingdom) Jonny Kane**	**HPD ARX-01C**	MI	**160**
8	**LMP2**	**42**	**(United Kingdom) Strakka Racing**	**(United Kingdom) Danny Watts (United Kingdom) Nick Leventis (United Kingdom) Jonny Kane**	**HPD AL7R 3.4 L V8**	MI	**160**
9	LMP2	40	(Portugal) Quifel ASM Team	(Portugal) Miguel Amaral (France) Olivier Pla	Ginetta-Zytek GZ09SB/2	D	160
9	LMP2	40	(Portugal) Quifel ASM Team	(Portugal) Miguel Amaral (France) Olivier Pla	Zytek ZG348 3.4 L V8	D	160
10	LMP2	35	OAK Racing; Team Mazda France	(France) Guillaume Moreau (Monaco) Richard Hein	Pescarolo 01	D	160
10	LMP2	35	OAK Racing; Team Mazda France	(France) Guillaume Moreau (Monaco) Richard Hein	Judd DB 3.4 L V8	D	160
11	LMP1	11	(United Kingdom) Drayson Racing	(United Kingdom) Paul Drayson (United Kingdom) Jonny Cocker	Lola B09/60	MI	157
11	LMP1	11	(United Kingdom) Drayson Racing	(United Kingdom) Paul Drayson (United Kingdom) Jonny Cocker	Judd GV5.5 S2 5.5 L V10	MI	157
12	LMP2	25	(United Kingdom) RML	(United Kingdom) Mike Newton (United Kingdom) Ben Collins (Brazil) Thomas Erdos	Lola B08/80	D	157
12	LMP2	25	(United Kingdom) RML	(United Kingdom) Mike Newton (United Kingdom) Ben Collins (Brazil) Thomas Erdos	HPD AL7R 3.4 V8	D	157
13	LMP2	30	(Italy) Racing Box (Italy) MIK Racing	(Italy) Fabio Babini (Italy) Fernando Geri (Italy) Federico Leo	Lola B09/80	MI	153
13	LMP2	30	(Italy) Racing Box (Italy) MIK Racing	(Italy) Fabio Babini (Italy) Fernando Geri (Italy) Federico Leo	Judd DB 3.4 L V8	MI	153
14	**FLM**	**44**	**(France) DAMS**	**(United Kingdom) Jody Firth (United Kingdom) Warren Hughes**	**Oreca FLM09**	MI	**152**
14	**FLM**	**44**	**(France) DAMS**	**(United Kingdom) Jody Firth (United Kingdom) Warren Hughes**	**Corvette 6.2 L V8**	MI	**152**
15	FLM	47	(Switzerland) Hope Polevision Racing	(Switzerland) Steve Zacchia (France) Olivier Lombard (Italy) Luca Moro	Oreca FLM09	MI	152
15	FLM	47	(Switzerland) Hope Polevision Racing	(Switzerland) Steve Zacchia (France) Olivier Lombard (Italy) Luca Moro	Corvette 6.2 L V8	MI	152
16	LMP2	24	OAK Racing; Team Mazda France	(France) Jacques Nicolet (France) Matthieu Lahaye	Pescarolo 01	D	151
16	LMP2	24	OAK Racing; Team Mazda France	(France) Jacques Nicolet (France) Matthieu Lahaye	Judd DB 3.4 L V8	D	151
17	FLM	48	(Switzerland) Hope Polevision Racing	(Belgium) Nico Verdonck (Switzerland) Christophe Pillon (United Kingdom) Charlie Hollings	Oreca FLM09	MI	151
17	FLM	48	(Switzerland) Hope Polevision Racing	(Belgium) Nico Verdonck (Switzerland) Christophe Pillon (United Kingdom) Charlie Hollings	Corvette 6.2 L V8	MI	151
18	LMP2	29	(Italy) Racing Box (Italy) MIK Racing	(Italy) Piergiuseppe Perazzini (Italy) Marco Cioci (Italy) Luca Pirri	Lola B09/80	MI	150
18	LMP2	29	(Italy) Racing Box (Italy) MIK Racing	(Italy) Piergiuseppe Perazzini (Italy) Marco Cioci (Italy) Luca Pirri	Judd DB 3.4 L V8	MI	150
19	LMP2	41	(United Kingdom) Team Bruichladdich	(Saudi Arabia) Karim Ojjeh (United Kingdom) Tim Greaves (Norway) Thor-Christian Ebbesvik	Ginetta-Zytek GZ09SB/2	D	150
19	LMP2	41	(United Kingdom) Team Bruichladdich	(Saudi Arabia) Karim Ojjeh (United Kingdom) Tim Greaves (Norway) Thor-Christian Ebbesvik	Zytek ZG348 3.4 L V8	D	150
20	FLM	43	(France) DAMS	(Italy) Alessandro Cicognani (Italy) Andrea Barlesi (France) Gary Chalandon	Oreca FLM09	MI	149
20	FLM	43	(France) DAMS	(Italy) Alessandro Cicognani (Italy) Andrea Barlesi (France) Gary Chalandon	Corvette 6.2 L V8	MI	149
21	LMP2	39	(Germany) KSM	(Spain) Lucas Ordoñez (France) Jean de Pourtales (United Kingdom) Jonathan Kennard	Lola B08/47	D	148
21	LMP2	39	(Germany) KSM	(Spain) Lucas Ordoñez (France) Jean de Pourtales (United Kingdom) Jonathan Kennard	Judd DB 3.4 L V8	D	148
22	LMP1	20	(United Kingdom) Team LNT	(United Kingdom) Johnny Mowlem (Canada) Tony Burgess (United States) Chris McMurry	Ginetta-Zytek GZ09S	D	148
22	LMP1	20	(United Kingdom) Team LNT	(United Kingdom) Johnny Mowlem (Canada) Tony Burgess (United States) Chris McMurry	Zytek ZG458 4.5 L V8	D	148
23	**GT2**	**96**	**(Italy) AF Corse**	**(Italy) Gianmaria Bruni (Brazil) Jaime Melo**	**Ferrari F430 GT2**	MI	**147**
23	**GT2**	**96**	**(Italy) AF Corse**	**(Italy) Gianmaria Bruni (Brazil) Jaime Melo**	**Ferrari 4.0 L V8**	MI	**147**
24	GT2	75	(Belgium) Prospeed Competition	(Germany) Marco Holzer (United Kingdom) Richard Westbrook	Porsche 997 GT3-RSR	MI	147
24	GT2	75	(Belgium) Prospeed Competition	(Germany) Marco Holzer (United Kingdom) Richard Westbrook	Porsche 4.0 L Flat-6	MI	147
25	GT2	92	(United Kingdom) JMW Motorsport	(United Kingdom) Rob Bell (United Kingdom) Darren Turner	Aston Martin V8 Vantage GT2	D	147
25	GT2	92	(United Kingdom) JMW Motorsport	(United Kingdom) Rob Bell (United Kingdom) Darren Turner	Aston Martin 4.5 L V8	D	147
26	GT2	91	(United Kingdom) CRS Racing	(United Kingdom) Andrew Kirkaldy (United Kingdom) Tim Mullen	Ferrari F430 GT2	MI	146
26	GT2	91	(United Kingdom) CRS Racing	(United Kingdom) Andrew Kirkaldy (United Kingdom) Tim Mullen	Ferrari 4.0 L V8	MI	146
27	GT2	77	(Germany) Team Felbermayr-Proton	(Germany) Marc Lieb (Austria) Richard Lietz	Porsche 997 GT3-RSR	MI	146
27	GT2	77	(Germany) Team Felbermayr-Proton	(Germany) Marc Lieb (Austria) Richard Lietz	Porsche 4.0 L Flat-6	MI	146
28	GT2	76	(France) IMSA Performance Matmut	(France) Patrick Pilet (France) Raymond Narac	Porsche 997 GT3-RSR	MI	145
28	GT2	76	(France) IMSA Performance Matmut	(France) Patrick Pilet (France) Raymond Narac	Porsche 4.0 L Flat-6	MI	145
29	GT2	85	(Netherlands) Spyker Squadron	(Netherlands) Tom Coronel (United Kingdom) Peter Dumbreck	Spyker C8 Laviolette GT2-R	MI	145
29	GT2	85	(Netherlands) Spyker Squadron	(Netherlands) Tom Coronel (United Kingdom) Peter Dumbreck	Audi 4.0 L V8	MI	145
30	GT2	78	(Germany) BMW Team Schnitzer	(Germany) Jörg Müller (Germany) Dirk Werner	BMW M3 GT2	D	145
30	GT2	78	(Germany) BMW Team Schnitzer	(Germany) Jörg Müller (Germany) Dirk Werner	BMW 4.0 L V8	D	145
31	GT2	94	(Italy) AF Corse	(Argentina) Luís Pérez Companc (Argentina) Matías Russo	Ferrari F430 GT2	MI	145
31	GT2	94	(Italy) AF Corse	(Argentina) Luís Pérez Companc (Argentina) Matías Russo	Ferrari 4.0 L V8	MI	145
32	GT2	88	(Germany) Team Felbermayr-Proton	(Germany) Christian Ried (Austria) Martin Ragginger (France) Romain Dumas	Porsche 997 GT3-RSR	MI	145
32	GT2	88	(Germany) Team Felbermayr-Proton	(Germany) Christian Ried (Austria) Martin Ragginger (France) Romain Dumas	Porsche 4.0 L Flat-6	MI	145
33	FLM	45	(Belgium) Boutsen Energy Racing	(Belgium) Nicolas De Crem (Austria) Dominik Kraihamer (Belgium) Bernard Delhez	Oreca FLM09	MI	141
33	FLM	45	(Belgium) Boutsen Energy Racing	(Belgium) Nicolas De Crem (Austria) Dominik Kraihamer (Belgium) Bernard Delhez	Corvette 6.2 L V8	MI	141
34	GT2	99	(United Arab Emirates) Gulf Team First	(France) Fabien Giroix (France) Roald Goethe	Lamborghini Gallardo LP560 GT2	D	135
34	GT2	99	(United Arab Emirates) Gulf Team First	(France) Fabien Giroix (France) Roald Goethe	Lamborghini 5.2 L V10	D	135
35	GT2	95	(Italy) AF Corse	(Italy) Giancarlo Fisichella (Finland) Toni Vilander (France) Jean Alesi	Ferrari F430 GT2	MI	134
35	GT2	95	(Italy) AF Corse	(Italy) Giancarlo Fisichella (Finland) Toni Vilander (France) Jean Alesi	Ferrari 4.0 L V8	MI	134
36	GT2	90	(United Kingdom) CRS Racing	(United Kingdom) Phil Quaife (Germany) Pierre Ehret (Germany) Pierre Kaffer	Ferrari F430 GT2	MI	134
36	GT2	90	(United Kingdom) CRS Racing	(United Kingdom) Phil Quaife (Germany) Pierre Ehret (Germany) Pierre Kaffer	Ferrari 4.0 L V8	MI	134
37	LMP1	13	(Switzerland) Rebellion Racing	(Italy) Andrea Belicchi (France) Jean-Christophe Boullion	Lola B10/60	MI	133
37	LMP1	13	(Switzerland) Rebellion Racing	(Italy) Andrea Belicchi (France) Jean-Christophe Boullion	Rebellion (Judd) 5.5 L V10	MI	133
38	**GT1**	**50**	**(France) Larbre Compétition**	**(Switzerland) Gabriele Gardel (France) Patrice Goueslard (Brazil) Fernando Rees**	**Saleen S7-R**	MI	**131**
38	**GT1**	**50**	**(France) Larbre Compétition**	**(Switzerland) Gabriele Gardel (France) Patrice Goueslard (Brazil) Fernando Rees**	**Ford 7.0 L V8**	MI	**131**
39	FLM	46	(Monaco) JMB Racing	(Netherlands) Peter Kutemann (Switzerland) Maurice Basso (United Kingdom) John Hartshorne	Oreca FLM09	MI	130
39	FLM	46	(Monaco) JMB Racing	(Netherlands) Peter Kutemann (Switzerland) Maurice Basso (United Kingdom) John Hartshorne	Corvette 6.2 L V8	MI	130
40	LMP2	27	(Switzerland) Race Performance	(Switzerland) Michel Frey (France) Pierre Bruneau (France) Marc Rostan	Radical SR9	D	124
40	LMP2	27	(Switzerland) Race Performance	(Switzerland) Michel Frey (France) Pierre Bruneau (France) Marc Rostan	Judd DB 3.4 L V8	D	124
41 NC	LMP2	31	(United Kingdom) RLR Msport	(United Kingdom) Barry Gates (United Kingdom) Rob Garofall (United Kingdom) Simon Phillips	MG-Lola EX265	D	141
41 NC	LMP2	31	(United Kingdom) RLR Msport	(United Kingdom) Barry Gates (United Kingdom) Rob Garofall (United Kingdom) Simon Phillips	AER P07 2.0 L Turbo I4	D	141
42 NC	LMP1	007	(United Kingdom) Aston Martin Racing	(Mexico) Adrian Fernández (Switzerland) Harold Primat (United Kingdom) Andy Meyrick	Lola-Aston Martin B09/60	MI	131
42 NC	LMP1	007	(United Kingdom) Aston Martin Racing	(Mexico) Adrian Fernández (Switzerland) Harold Primat (United Kingdom) Andy Meyrick	Aston Martin AM04 6.0 L V12	MI	131
43 DNF	GT2	89	(Germany) Hankook Team Farnbacher	(Germany) Dominik Farnbacher (Denmark) Allan Simonsen	Ferrari F430 GT2	HK	44
43 DNF	GT2	89	(Germany) Hankook Team Farnbacher	(Germany) Dominik Farnbacher (Denmark) Allan Simonsen	Ferrari 4.0 L V8	HK	44
44 DNF	LMP1	7	(Germany) Audi Sport Team Joest	(Denmark) Tom Kristensen (United Kingdom) Allan McNish	Audi R15 TDI plus	MI	15
44 DNF	LMP1	7	(Germany) Audi Sport Team Joest	(Denmark) Tom Kristensen (United Kingdom) Allan McNish	Audi TDI 5.5 L Turbo V10 (Diesel)	MI	15
45 DNF	LMP2	36	(France) Pegasus Racing	(France) Julien Schell (France) Frédéric da Rocha	Oreca-Courage LC75	D	2
45 DNF	LMP2	36	(France) Pegasus Racing	(France) Julien Schell (France) Frédéric da Rocha	AER P07 2.0 L Turbo I4	D	2

== See also ==
- 1000 km Silverstone

Le Mans Series
Previous race: 1000 km of Hungaroring	2010 season	Next race: none
Intercontinental Le Mans Cup
Previous race: none	2010 season	Next race: Petit Le Mans
