= 2010 1000 km of Zhuhai =

2010 auto race in Zhuhai, China

The Track map of Zhuhai International Circuit

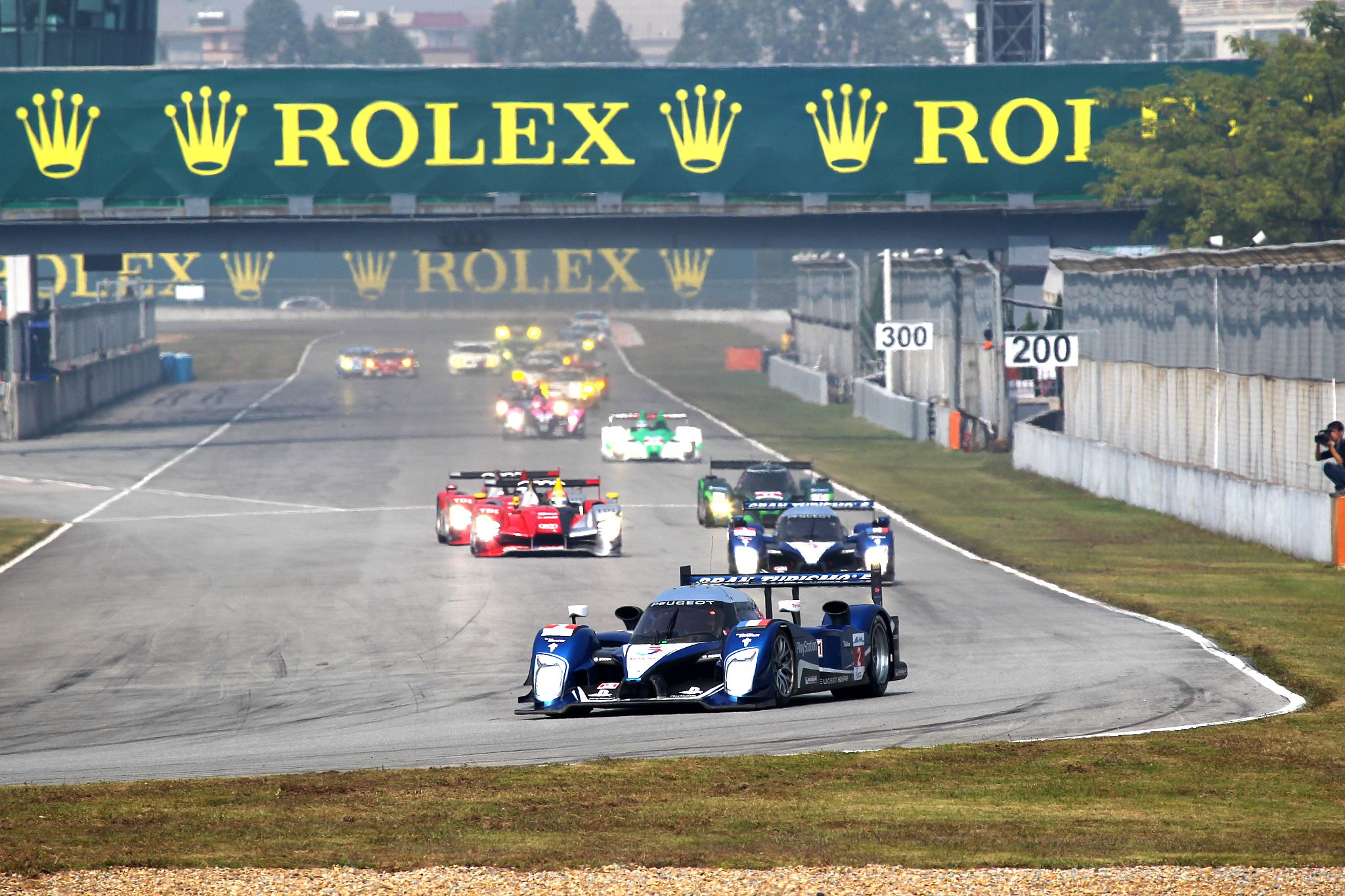
The start of the 2010 1000km of Zhuhai.

The 2010 1000 km of Zhuhai was an auto race held on 5–7 November 2010 at the Zhuhai International Circuit in Zhuhai, China. The 1000 km of Zhuhai was the first race in China to be run under Automobile Club de l'Ouest (ACO) regulations. The race served as the final round of the 2010 Intercontinental Le Mans Cup. Peugeot won the race and secured the Team and Manufacturer titles in the Intercontinental Cup, defeating Audi. Ferrari and AF Corse also secured the GT2 Intercontinental Cup, despite finishing third in the class behind the BMW Team Schnitzer entry.

This race also marked the first time that the ACO allowed competitors from the FIA GT3 category to compete alongside their normal categories, with Hong Kong–based KK Performance winning the inaugural race for the GTC class. This was also the last appearance of GT1 category in ACO-sanctioned series.

== Qualifying ==
=== Qualifying result ===
Pole position winners in each class are marked in bold.

Pos	Class	Team	Lap Time	Grid
1	**LMP1**	**No. 2 Team Peugeot Total**	**1:21.868**	**1**
2	LMP1	No. 1 Team Peugeot Total	1:22.953	2
3	LMP1	No. 7 Audi Sport Team Joest	1:23.152	3
4	LMP1	No. 8 Audi Sport Team Joest	1:24.589	4
5	LMP1	No. 11 Drayson Racing	1:28.916	5
6	LMP1	No. 23 Tōkai University/YGK Power	1:30.869	6
7	**LMP2**	**No. 35 OAK Racing**	**1:32.936**	**7**
8	**FLM**	**No. 47 Hope Polevision Racing**	**1:33.227**	**8**
9	**GT1**	**No. 69 JLOC**	**1:33.516**	**9**
10	**GTH**	**No. 92 Porsche AG**	**1:33.789**	**10**
11	**GTC**	**No. 98 KK Performance**	**1:34.959**	**11**
12	GT1	No. 50 Larbre Compétition	1:35.217	12
13	GTC	No. 96 United Autosports	1:35.682	13
14	**GT2**	**No. 95 AF Corse**	**1:35.810**	**14**
15	GT2	No. 77 Team Felbermayr-Proton	1:36.114	15
16	GT2	No. 78 BMW Team Schnitzer	1:36.166	16
17	GT2	No. 90 CRS Racing	1:36.210	17
18	GT2	No. 75 Prospeed Competition	1:36.300	18
19	GT2	No. 88 Team Felbermayr-Proton	1:36.527	19
20	GT2	No. 81 Jaguar RSR	1:37.379	20
21	GTC	No. 91 Team Hong Kong Racing	1:37.800	21
22	GTC	No. 97 United Autosports	1:37.888	22
23	GT2	No. 99 Gulf Team First	3:17.517	23

== Race ==
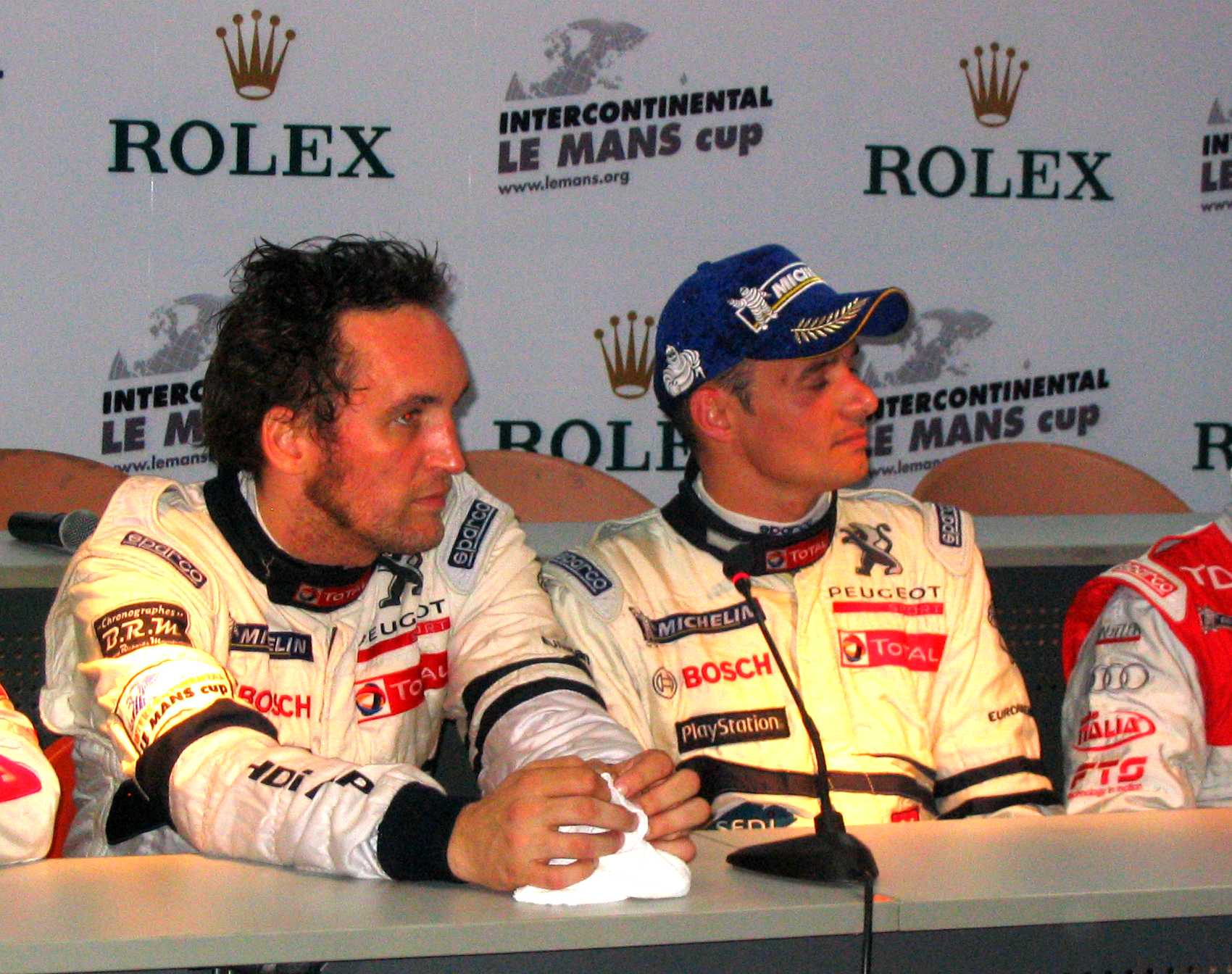
LMP1 winners Franck Montagny and Stéphane Sarrazin.

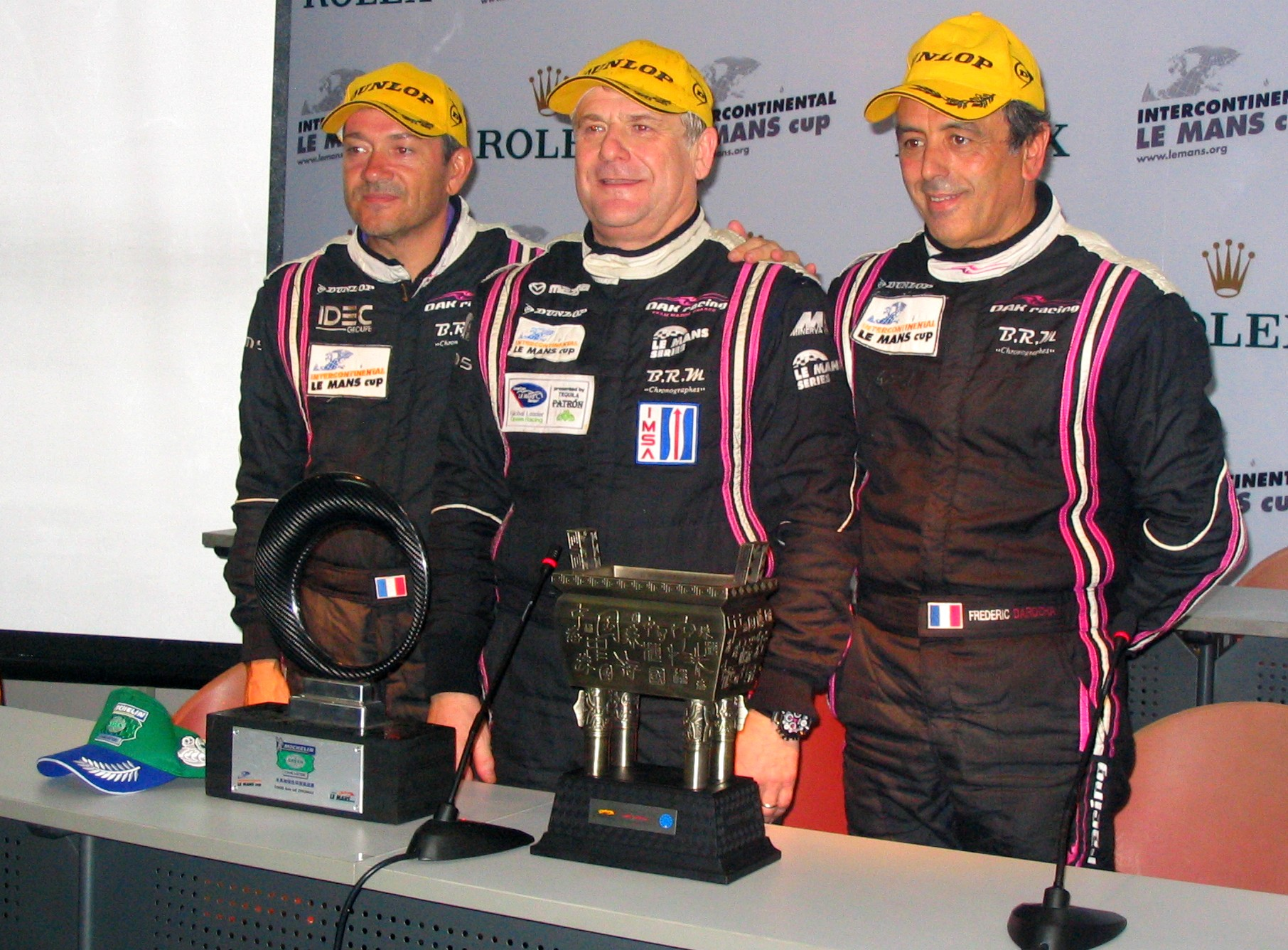
LMP2 winners Jacques Nicolet, Frédéric Da Rocha and Patrice Lafargue.

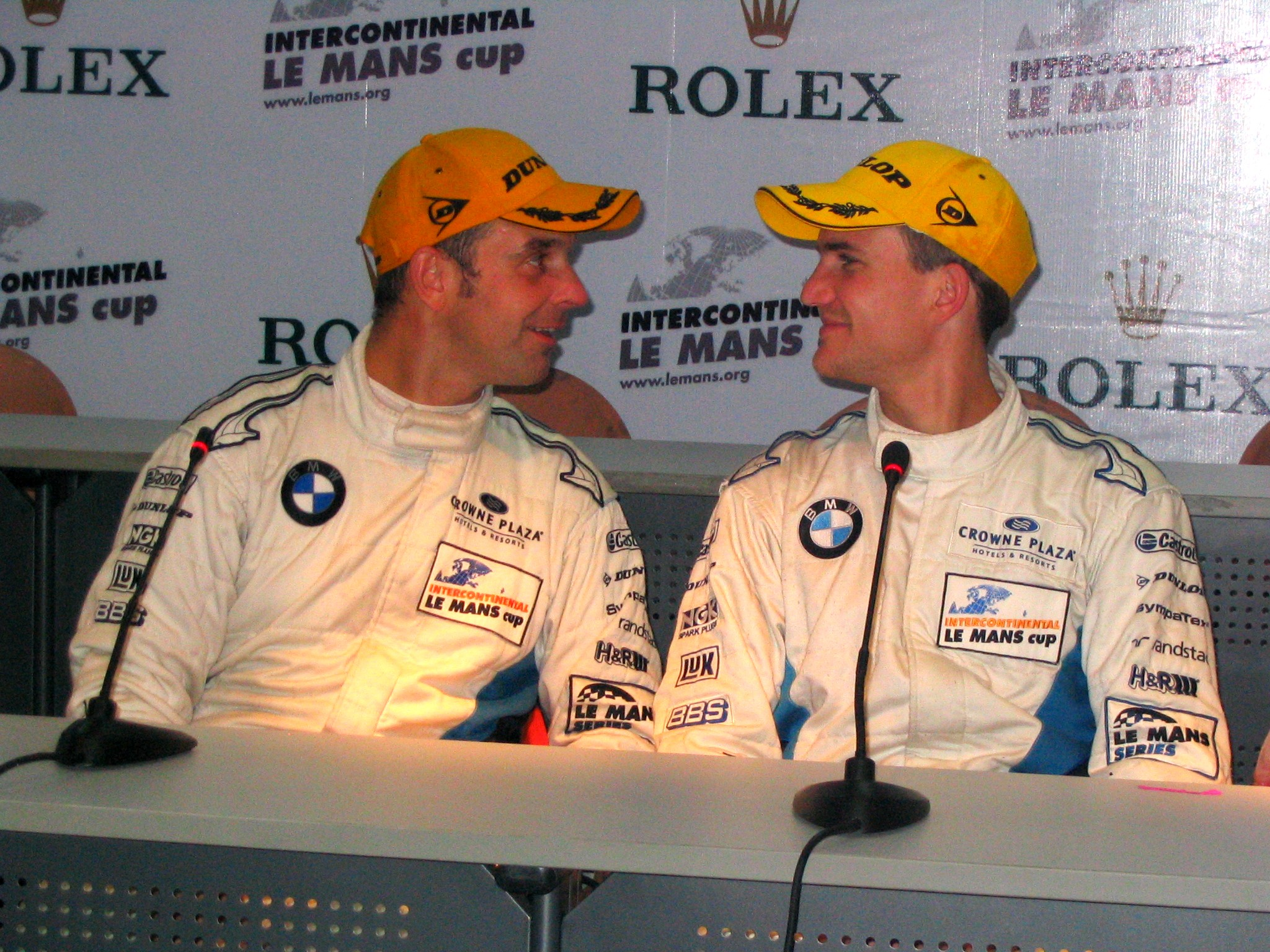
GT2 winners Jörg Müller and Dirk Werner.

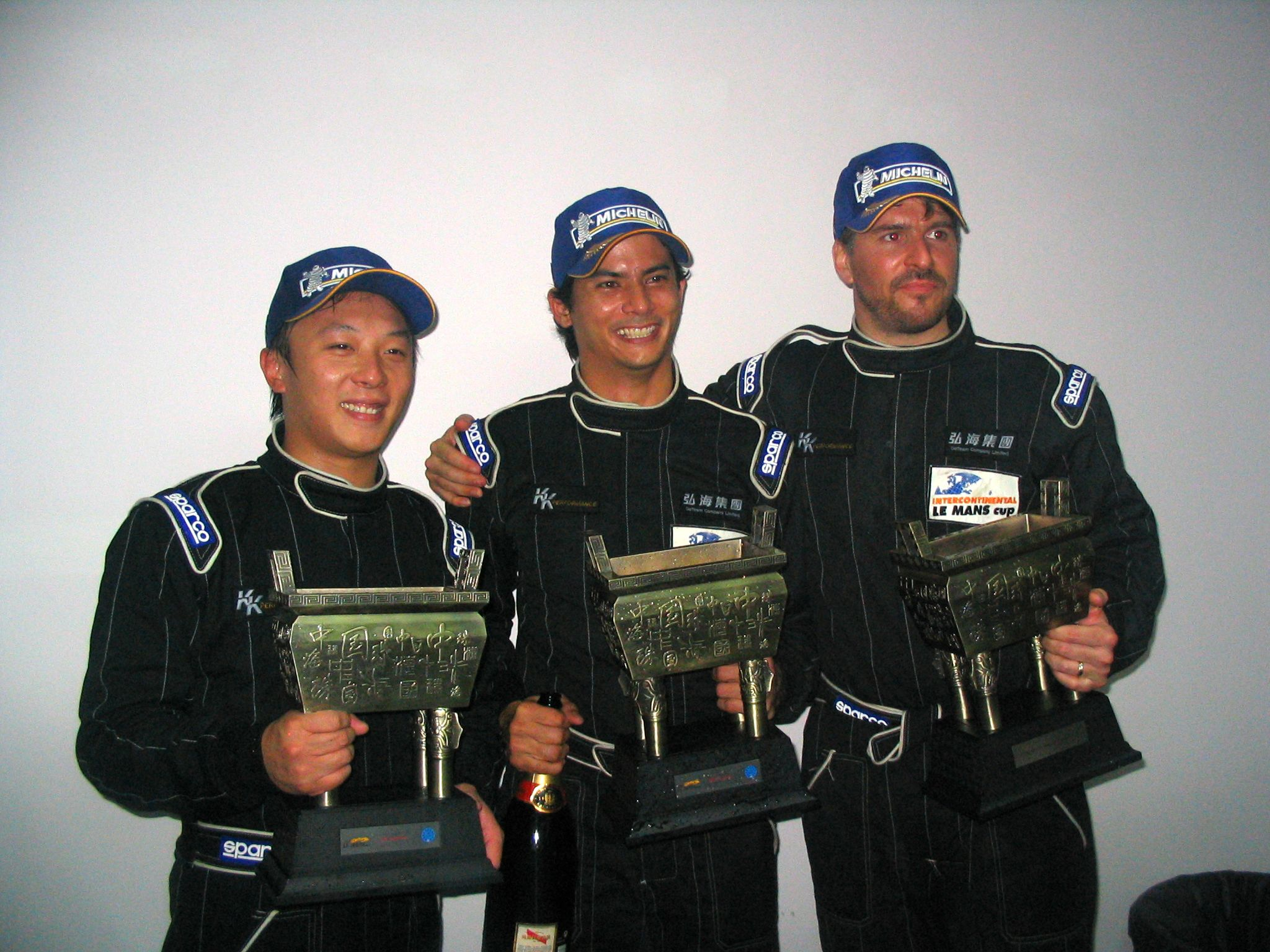
GTC winners Marchy Lee, Alex Yoong and Matthew Marsh.

=== Race result ===
Class winners in bold. Cars failing to complete 70% of winner's distance marked as Not Classified (NC).

Pos	Class	No	Team	Drivers	Chassis	Tyre	Laps
Pos	Class	No	Team	Drivers	Engine	Tyre	Laps
1	**LMP1**	**2**	**(France) Team Peugeot Total**	**(France) Franck Montagny (France) Stéphane Sarrazin**	**Peugeot 908 HDi FAP**	MI	**232**
1	**LMP1**	**2**	**(France) Team Peugeot Total**	**(France) Franck Montagny (France) Stéphane Sarrazin**	**Peugeot HDi 5.5 L Turbo V12 (Diesel)**	MI	**232**
2	LMP1	7	(Germany) Audi Sport Team Joest	(Denmark) Tom Kristensen (United Kingdom) Allan McNish	Audi R15 TDI plus	MI	232
2	LMP1	7	(Germany) Audi Sport Team Joest	(Denmark) Tom Kristensen (United Kingdom) Allan McNish	Audi TDI 5.5 L Turbo V10 (Diesel)	MI	232
3	LMP1	8	(Germany) Audi Sport Team Joest	(Italy) Rinaldo Capello (France) Romain Dumas	Audi R15 TDI plus	MI	232
3	LMP1	8	(Germany) Audi Sport Team Joest	(Italy) Rinaldo Capello (France) Romain Dumas	Audi TDI 5.5 L Turbo V10 (Diesel)	MI	232
4	LMP1	1	(France) Team Peugeot Total	(France) Sébastien Bourdais (France) Simon Pagenaud	Peugeot 908 HDi FAP	MI	229
4	LMP1	1	(France) Team Peugeot Total	(France) Sébastien Bourdais (France) Simon Pagenaud	Peugeot HDi 5.5 L Turbo V12 (Diesel)	MI	229
5	**LMP2**	**35**	**(France) OAK Racing**	**(France) Jacques Nicolet (France) Frédéric da Rocha (France) Patrice Lafargue**	**Pescarolo 01 Evo**	D	**206**
5	**LMP2**	**35**	**(France) OAK Racing**	**(France) Jacques Nicolet (France) Frédéric da Rocha (France) Patrice Lafargue**	**Judd DB 3.4 L V8**	D	**206**
6	**GTH**	**92**	**(Germany) Porsche AG**	**(Germany) Jörg Bergmeister (United States) Patrick Long**	**Porsche 997 GT3-R Hybrid**	MI	**205**
6	**GTH**	**92**	**(Germany) Porsche AG**	**(Germany) Jörg Bergmeister (United States) Patrick Long**	**Porsche 4.0 L Hybrid Flat-6**	MI	**205**
7	**GT2**	**78**	**(Germany) BMW Team Schnitzer**	**(Germany) Jörg Müller (Germany) Dirk Werner**	**BMW M3 GT2**	D	**202**
7	**GT2**	**78**	**(Germany) BMW Team Schnitzer**	**(Germany) Jörg Müller (Germany) Dirk Werner**	**BMW 4.0 L V8**	D	**202**
8	GT2	77	(Germany) Team Felbermayr-Proton	(Germany) Marc Lieb (Austria) Richard Lietz	Porsche 997 GT3-RSR	MI	202
8	GT2	77	(Germany) Team Felbermayr-Proton	(Germany) Marc Lieb (Austria) Richard Lietz	Porsche 4.0 L Flat-6	MI	202
9	**FLM**	**47**	**(Switzerland) Hope Polevision Racing**	**(Switzerland) Steve Zacchia (China) Shan Qi Zhang (Taiwan) Jeffrey Lee**	**Oreca FLM09**	MI	**201**
9	**FLM**	**47**	**(Switzerland) Hope Polevision Racing**	**(Switzerland) Steve Zacchia (China) Shan Qi Zhang (Taiwan) Jeffrey Lee**	**Corvette LS3 6.2 L V8**	MI	**201**
10	GT2	95	(Italy) AF Corse	(Italy) Gianmaria Bruni (Finland) Toni Vilander (Brazil) Jaime Melo	Ferrari F430 GTE	MI	199
10	GT2	95	(Italy) AF Corse	(Italy) Gianmaria Bruni (Finland) Toni Vilander (Brazil) Jaime Melo	Ferrari 4.0 L V8	MI	199
11	GT2	88	(Germany) Team Felbermayr-Proton	(Austria) Martin Ragginger (Germany) Christian Ried (Italy) Gianluca Roda	Porsche 997 GT3-RSR	MI	192
11	GT2	88	(Germany) Team Felbermayr-Proton	(Austria) Martin Ragginger (Germany) Christian Ried (Italy) Gianluca Roda	Porsche 4.0 L Flat-6	MI	192
12	**GTC**	**98**	**(Hong Kong) KK Performance**	**(Hong Kong) Marchy Lee (Malaysia) Alex Yoong (Hong Kong) Matthew Marsh**	**Audi R8 LMS**	MI	**192**
12	**GTC**	**98**	**(Hong Kong) KK Performance**	**(Hong Kong) Marchy Lee (Malaysia) Alex Yoong (Hong Kong) Matthew Marsh**	**Audi 5.2 V10**	MI	**192**
13	GT2	90	(United Kingdom) CRS Racing	(Germany) Pierre Ehret (United Kingdom) Phil Quaife (United Kingdom) Andrew Kirkaldy	Ferrari F430 GTE	MI	191
13	GT2	90	(United Kingdom) CRS Racing	(Germany) Pierre Ehret (United Kingdom) Phil Quaife (United Kingdom) Andrew Kirkaldy	Ferrari 4.0 L V8	MI	191
14	LMP1	23	(Japan) Tōkai University-YGK Power	(Japan) Shogo Mitsuyama (Japan) Shigekazu Wakisaka	Courage-Oreca LC70E	Y	190
14	LMP1	23	(Japan) Tōkai University-YGK Power	(Japan) Shogo Mitsuyama (Japan) Shigekazu Wakisaka	YGK YR40T 4.0 L Turbo V8	Y	190
15	GT2	99	(United Arab Emirates) Gulf Team First	(France) Fabien Giroix (Germany) Roald Goethe	Lamborghini Gallardo LP560 GT2	D	187
15	GT2	99	(United Arab Emirates) Gulf Team First	(France) Fabien Giroix (Germany) Roald Goethe	Lamborghini 5.2 L V10	D	187
16	GTC	91	Team Hong Kong Racing	(Hong Kong) Philip Ma (Switzerland) Mathias Beche	Aston Martin DBRS9	MI	172
16	GTC	91	Team Hong Kong Racing	(Hong Kong) Philip Ma (Switzerland) Mathias Beche	Aston Martin 6.0 L V12	MI	172
17	GTC	97	(United States) United Autosports	(France) Henri Richard (Hong Kong) Alain Li	Audi R8 LMS	D	171
17	GTC	97	(United States) United Autosports	(France) Henri Richard (Hong Kong) Alain Li	Audi 5.2 L V10	D	171
18	**GT1**	**50**	**(France) Larbre Compétition**	**(France) Patrick Bornhauser (France) Laurent Groppi (Portugal) Pedro Lamy**	**Saleen S7-R**	MI	**170**
18	**GT1**	**50**	**(France) Larbre Compétition**	**(France) Patrick Bornhauser (France) Laurent Groppi (Portugal) Pedro Lamy**	**Ford 7.0 L V8**	MI	**170**
19 DNF	LMP1	11	(United Kingdom) Drayson Racing	(United Kingdom) Paul Drayson (United Kingdom) Jonny Cocker	Lola B09/60	MI	141
19 DNF	LMP1	11	(United Kingdom) Drayson Racing	(United Kingdom) Paul Drayson (United Kingdom) Jonny Cocker	Judd GV5.5 S2 5.5 L V10	MI	141
20 DNF	GTC	96	(United States) United Autosports	(United Kingdom) Danny Watts (United Kingdom) Richard Meins (Hong Kong) Frank Yu	Audi R8 LMS	D	168
20 DNF	GTC	96	(United States) United Autosports	(United Kingdom) Danny Watts (United Kingdom) Richard Meins (Hong Kong) Frank Yu	Audi 5.2 L V10	D	168
21 DNF	GT2	75	(Belgium) Prospeed Competition	(United Kingdom) Richard Westbrook (Hong Kong) Darryl O'Young	Porsche 997 GT3-RSR	MI	119
21 DNF	GT2	75	(Belgium) Prospeed Competition	(United Kingdom) Richard Westbrook (Hong Kong) Darryl O'Young	Porsche 4.0 L Flat-6	MI	119
22 DNF	GT1	69	(Japan) JLOC	(Japan) Hiroyuki Iiri (Japan) Yuhi Sekiguchi (Japan) Yuya Sakamoto	Lamborghini Murciélago R-SV	Y	10
22 DNF	GT1	69	(Japan) JLOC	(Japan) Hiroyuki Iiri (Japan) Yuhi Sekiguchi (Japan) Yuya Sakamoto	Lamborghini 6.5 L V12	Y	10
23 DNF	GT2	81	(United States) JaguarRSR	(Belgium) Marc Goossens (United States) Paul Gentilozzi	Jaguar XKRS	Y	10
23 DNF	GT2	81	(United States) JaguarRSR	(Belgium) Marc Goossens (United States) Paul Gentilozzi	Jaguar 5.0 L V8	Y	10

== See also ==
- Asian Le Mans Series

Intercontinental Le Mans Cup
Previous race: Petit Le Mans	2010 season	Next race: none
