= Peugeot 908 HDi FAP =

Sports prototype racing car

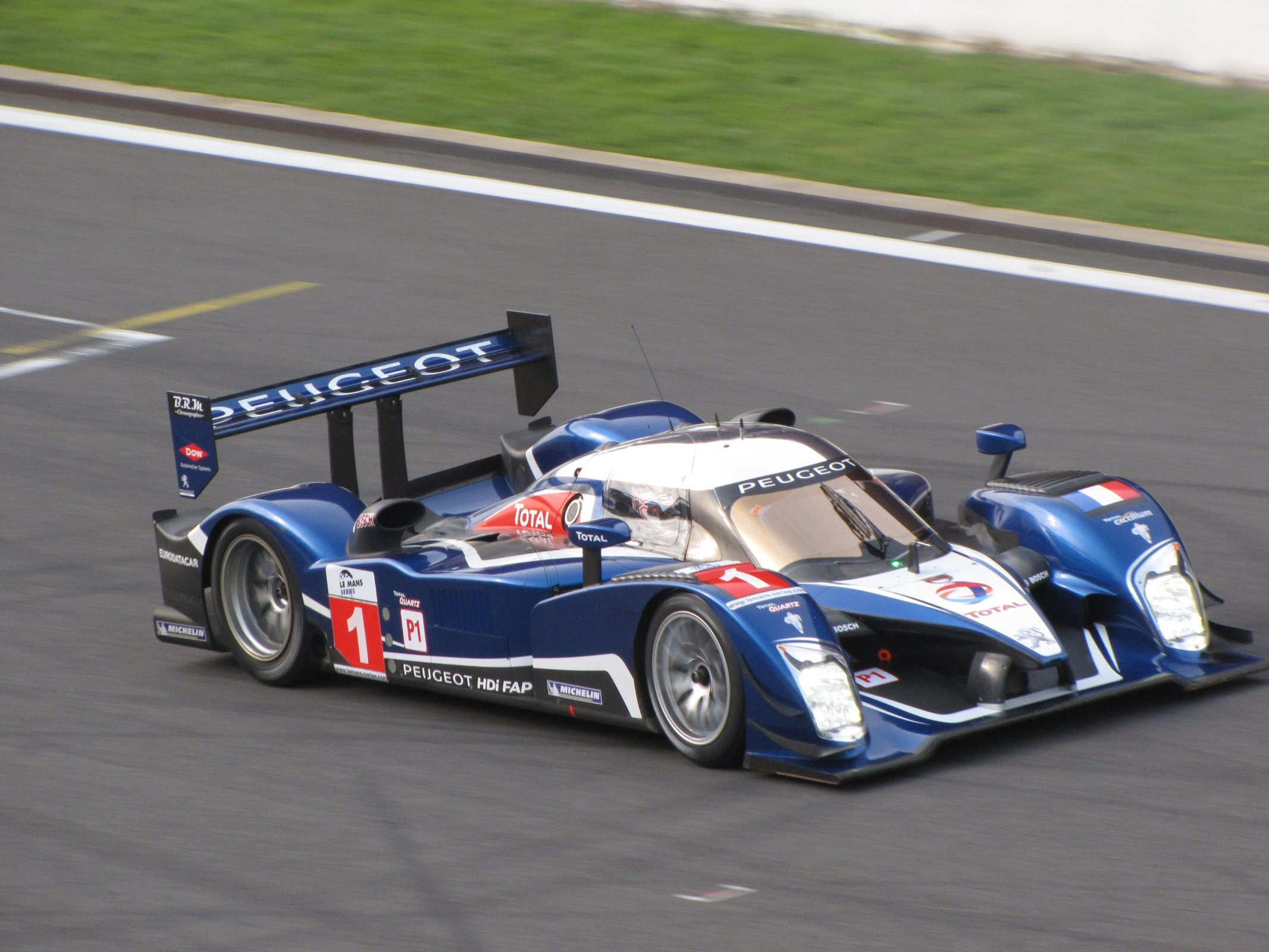
- The No. 1 908 HDi FAP driven by Anthony Davidson during the 2010 1000 km of Spa.
- Category: Le Mans Prototype LMP1
- Constructor: Peugeot
- Designers: Paolo Catone (head of design); Claude Guillois (engine); Jean-Marc Schmidt (chassis); Guillaume Cattelani (aerodynamics)
- Predecessor: Peugeot 905
- Successor: Peugeot 908

Technical specifications
- Chassis: Carbon fibre monocoque
- Axle track: 2,000 mm (78.7 in)
- Wheelbase: 2,950 mm (116.1 in)
- Engine: Peugeot HDi FAP 5.5 litre 100° V12 twin-turbo, mid-engined, longitudinally mounted
- Transmission: 6-speed sequential manual
- Weight: Appr. 930 kg (2,050.3 lb)
- Fuel: Total Diesel
- Tyres: Michelin

Competition history
- Notable entrants: (France) Peugeot Sport (France) Pescarolo Sport (France) Team Oreca
- Notable drivers: (France) Nicolas Minassian (Canada) Jacques Villeneuve (Spain) Marc Gené (France) Stéphane Sarrazin (Portugal) Pedro Lamy (France) Sébastien Bourdais (Austria) Alexander Wurz (Brazil) Ricardo Zonta (Austria) Christian Klien (France) Franck Montagny (France) Simon Pagenaud (United Kingdom) Anthony Davidson (Australia) David Brabham
- Debut: 2007 1000 km of Monza
- First win: 2007 1000 km of Monza
- Last win: 2011 12 Hours of Sebring
- Last event: 2011 Petit Le Mans
Races	Wins	Poles	F/Laps
30	20	23	20
- Teams' Championships: 3 (2007 Le Mans Series, 2010 Le Mans Series, 2010 Intercontinental Le Mans Cup)
- Constructors' Championships: 3 (Le Mans Series 2007, 2010 Le Mans Series, 2010 Intercontinental Le Mans Cup)
- Drivers' Championships: 2 (Le Mans Series 2007, 2010 Le Mans Series)

The Peugeot 908 HDi FAP is a sports prototype racing car built by the French automobile manufacturer Peugeot to compete in the 24 Hours of Le Mans endurance race, starting in 2007 and eventually winning in 2009. This effort, in development since 2005, was publicly unveiled on 15 June 2006. It first competed against the Audi R10 TDI, becoming the second diesel engined sports car from a major manufacturer, and then against the Audi R15 TDI. This was Peugeot Sport's first Le Mans effort since the end of the Peugeot 905 project in 1993. It won 19 from the 28 races in which it raced between 2007 and 2011.

"908 HDi FAP" reads as follows: 908 deals with the 90x series for racing cars at Peugeot; HDi is the acronym for [English] "High Pressure Direct Injection" (French: Injection directe à haute pression) and FAP is the acronym for [French] "Filtre à particules" (English: particulate filter"). The 908 name is also shared with a Peugeot concept saloon/sedan, named the 908RC, which shares the diesel V12 engine from the 908 sportscar and with the successor sports prototype racing car of Peugeot for 2011 season, simply named "908". The Peugeot 908 is not to be confused with another sportscar of the same number that successfully raced from 1968 to 1981, the Porsche 908.

At the 2008 1000 km of Silverstone, Peugeot Sport unveiled the 908 HY, a hybrid electric variant of the diesel 908, with KERS. Peugeot planned to campaign the car in the 2009 Le Mans Series season, even though it would not be capable of scoring championship points, but gave up the idea to concentrate on preparation for the 2009 24 Hours of Le Mans.

== Design ==
=== Chassis ===
As part of new rules announced by the Automobile Club de l'Ouest (ACO) on 16 June 2006 which encouraged closed cockpit Le Mans Prototypes, Peugeot unveiled the 908 with a closed cockpit, the first Le Mans Prototype (LMP) since the Bentley Speed 8 to race with such a design. Peugeot's choice of a closed cockpit is possibly intended to allow the 908 to run a larger air restrictor due to rules mandating the use of air conditioning on closed cockpit designs.

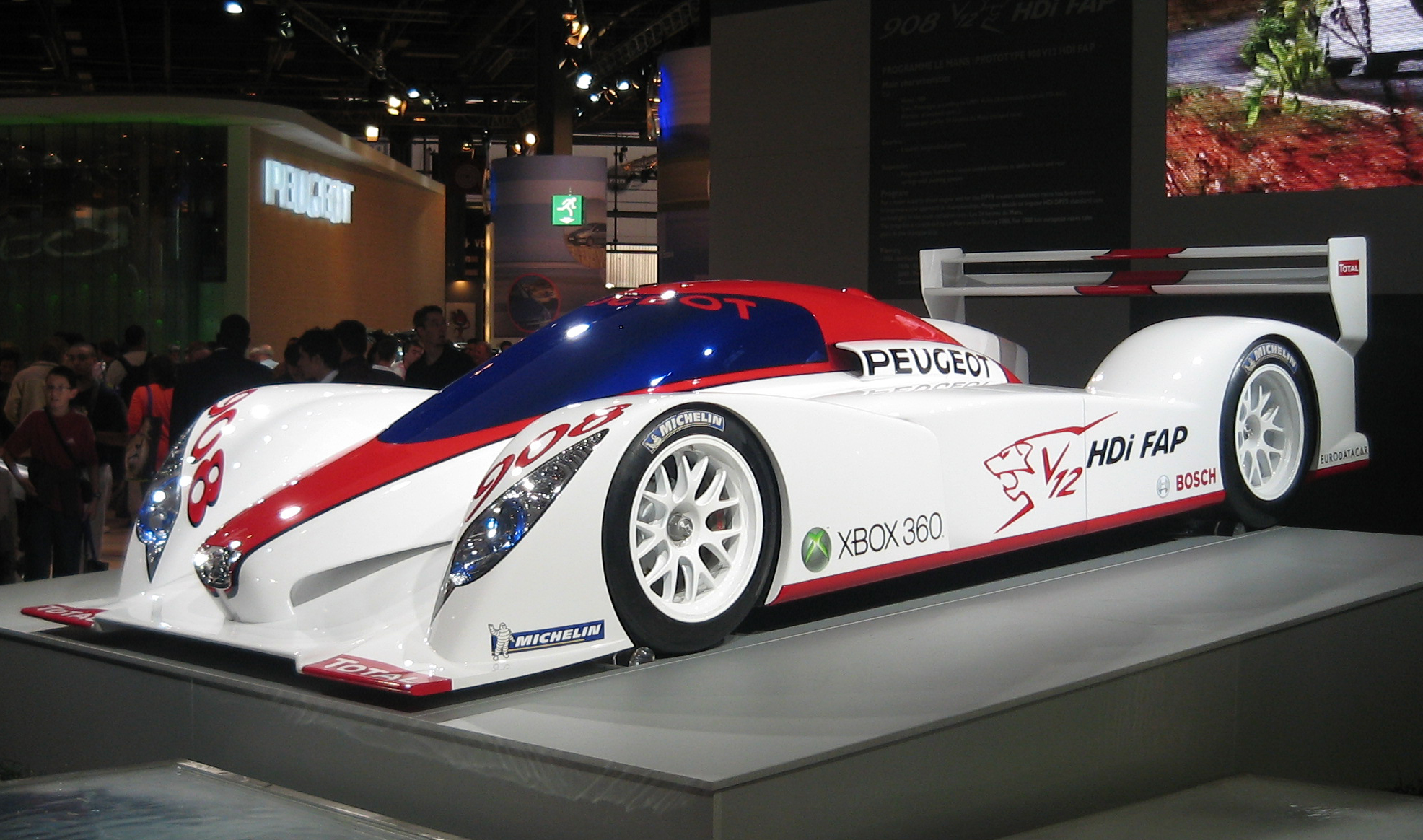
An early 908 design model shown in 2006

Peugeot also felt that weight, centre of gravity, and operational drawbacks were able to be overcome by better chassis rigidity and aerodynamics with using a closed cockpit design. The cockpit uses a unique 2 part door system with the upper part of the door (the window) swinging forward and out with a hinged plate (part of the sidepod) forming the lower part of the door that can be either swung out or removed completely, this was reportedly done to allow the car to conform to current regulations regarding door size. The body is a carbon fibre monocoque instead of a conventional open structure to offer better rigidity and lower weight. Front and rear suspension are linked, steering is electrically powered, magnesium wheels come from BBS. The car measures 4.65 m (183 in) ×2 m (79 in) and weighs 925 kg (2,039 lb) minimum. Peugeot announced they would build the 908 chassis themselves, instead of relying on another manufacturer to build it for them.

=== Drivetrain ===
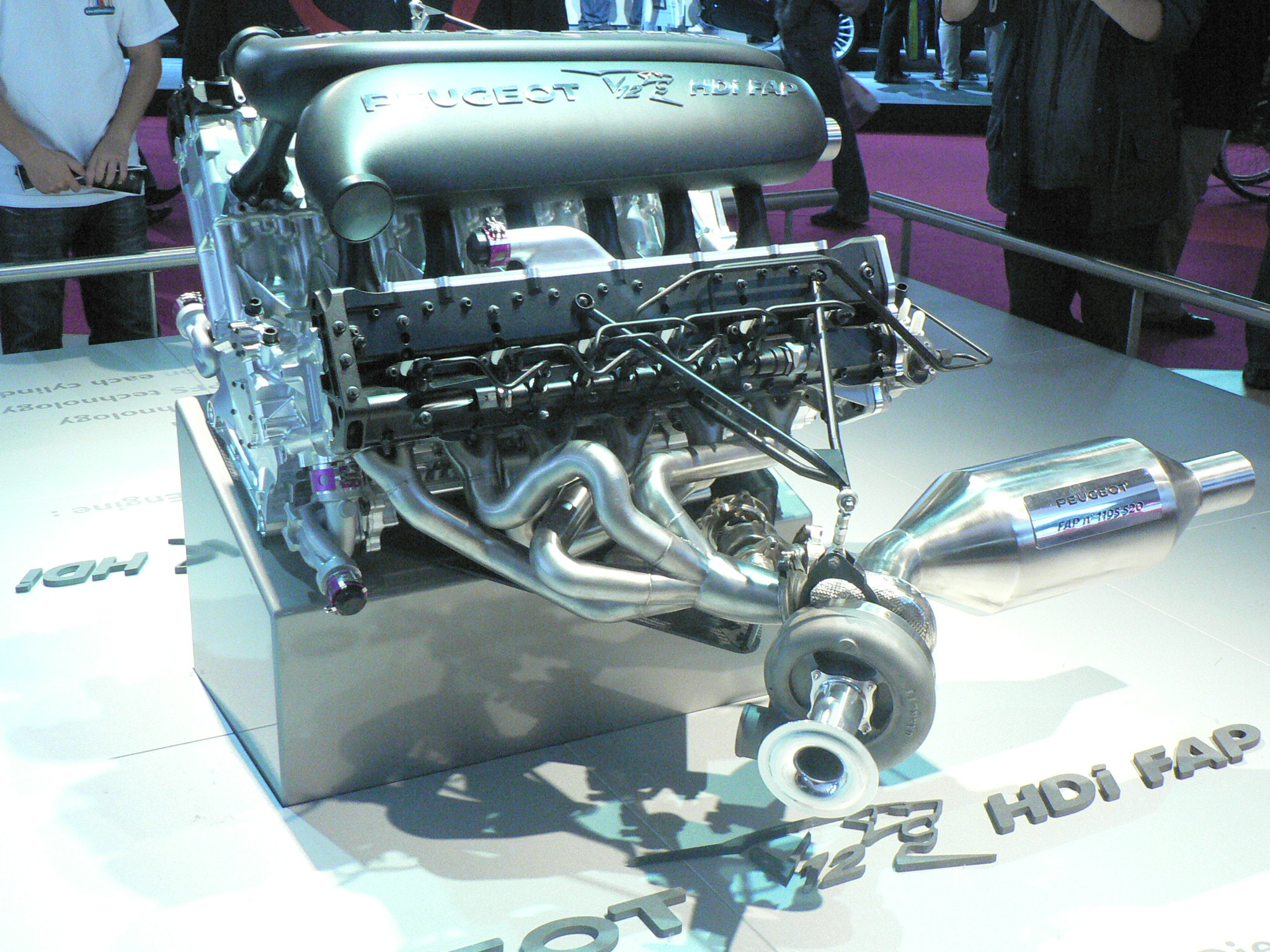
The 908's 5.5 litre twin-turbocharged diesel V12. One of the FAP particulate filters is on the right.

Peugeot 908 HDI FAP (2009)
2009 Peugeot 908 HDI FAP at Goodwood Festival of Speed 2009

The Peugeot 908 is powered by a 5.5 L (340 cu in) HDi diesel engine, the maximum size allowed by Le Mans Prototype rules. Its configuration is a 100° V12, the angle having been chosen to lower the center of gravity. Its output has been revealed to be over 730 horsepower (540 kW) and 1,200 N⋅m (890 lbf⋅ft) of torque, nearly 10% more than Audi's similar R10 TDI.

Oil systems are developed by technical partner TotalEnergies. The electro-pneumatic controlled gearbox, designed and built by Ricardo, is longitudinal with a maximum of 6 gear ratios, and the differential is self-locking.

=== 908 Hybrid Electric ===
In 2009, Peugeot developed 908 HY, a hybrid electric version of the 908 diesel. The 908 HY adds an 80 hp (60 kW) electric motor, replacing the car's standard starter motor. The motor is powered by 600 lithium ion batteries which are located in the cockpit and on the left bottom of the car. The batteries are charged through regenerative braking, requiring approximately 20 to 30 seconds to recharge.

The electric motor can be used to provide extra power to the car for approximately 20 seconds, either automatically or through driver activation. The motor can also run on its own while the car is entering a pit lane, shutting the diesel motor off to conserve fuel. The electrical systems add approximately 45 kg (99 lb) to the weight of the standard 908, although Peugeot believed they can lower this weight further.

== Planning ==
On September 28, 2006, Peugeot unveiled a model of the 908 at the Mondial de l'Automobile Paris Auto Show. The V12 HDi would be started for the first time in a bench test on 30 September, while the actual first chassis would start test driving in December with Éric Hélary in preparation for a 2-car effort at Le Mans along with participation in the full 2007 Le Mans Series season. The team would be sponsored by Xbox 360, Total, and tyre supplier Michelin.

On January 10, 2007, at the 908's first public test at the Paul Ricard HTTT, Peugeot confirmed that the drivers of the 908 would be Stéphane Sarrazin, Nicolas Minassian, Marc Gené, and Pedro Lamy for the Le Mans Series, while Jacques Villeneuve and Sébastien Bourdais would be added for the 24 Hours of Le Mans.

== Racing history ==
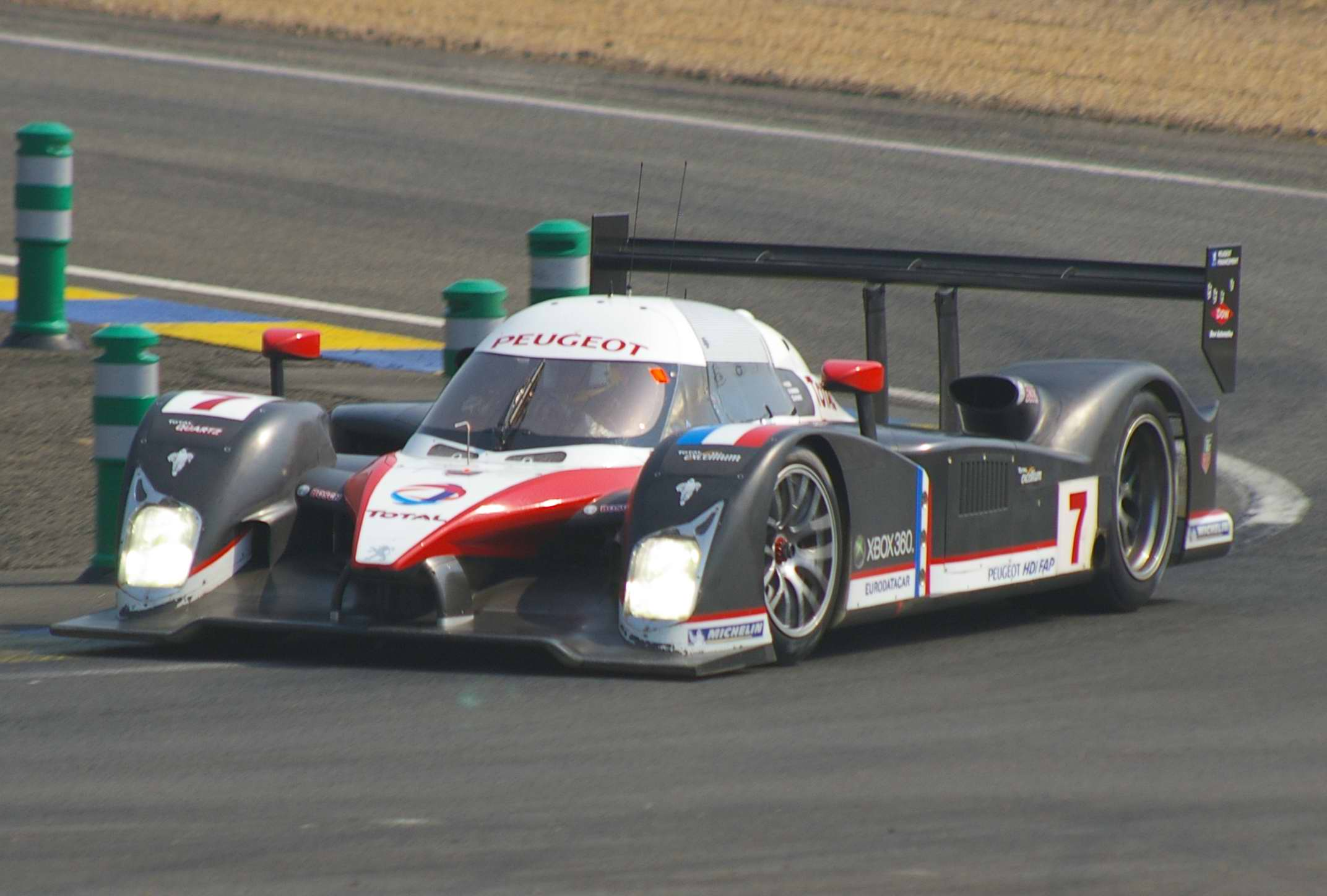
The #7 Peugeot 908 being driven by Jacques Villeneuve at the 2007 24 Hours of Le Mans test session.

=== 2007 ===
The Peugeot 908 made its race debut at the opening round of the 2007 Le Mans Series season, the 1000km of Monza. The two 908s were very quick in qualifying, managing to take the top two spots by over a second from the nearest competitor. During the race the Peugeot lead nearly the entire race, although the #8 car of Lamy and Sarrazin suffered numerous difficulties with its doors, leaving them to finish third. However the #7 908 of Gené and Minassian held on to take victory in the 908's debut. At the next round at Valencia, it would be the #8 Peugeot's turn to take the win, while the #7 car suffered clutch problems and did not finish.

On the 3rd of June 2007, Peugeot managed to best the Audi R10 TDI diesel, setting a Le Mans test day lap time of 3:26.707. This was followed by Peugeot earning pole position in Le Mans qualifying with a 3:26.344 set by Stéphane Sarrazin, again beating Audi - although it is believed Audi did not go as fast as they could, unlike Peugeot. In the race, where the cars competed directly for the first time, the Audi R10s were obviously faster than the Peugeots on the straights and much more stable in the corners. The #8 Peugeot finished second to the Audi R10 after covering 359 laps. The #7 Peugeot sister car had to withdraw from the race in the final hour due to engine failure. When the stricken car reached the pits for the second time, Peugeot mechanics made no effort to resolve its problems and simply withdrew it from the race.

Following the break for Le Mans, the Peugeots returned to the Le Mans Series. Peugeot #8 would take two straight victories at Nürburgring and Spa before the #7 908 took the last two wins of the season at Silverstone and Interlagos. Winning three races and finishing in five out of six, 908 #8 won the LMP1 teams' championship, while the #7 car would suffer some reliability issues and would settle for third in the championship, behind Pescarolo Sport.

=== 2008 ===
For 2008, Peugeot expanded their 908 program to include the 12 Hours of Sebring. Although the sole 908 led early, mechanical problems dropped the car from contention. However, the 908 completed the event, serving in preparation for a return to Le Mans. Back in the Le Mans Series, the two team 908s now had to face newcomer Audi, as they too entered two R10 diesels. The 908 however opened the season with a victory in Catalunya, marking the first time a 908 has beaten an R10. For Le Mans three 908s were entered and the team started on pole position as they had in 2007. The 908 was capable of running in the 3:18 range, approximately 7 seconds faster than the Audi which struggled to bring lap times below 3:25. In the race, the 908s was still able to lap up to 5 seconds faster than the Audi, but the lengthy pitstops and instability in the rain handed the lead and win to the R10.

Peugeot finished their season at the 1000 km of Silverstone, but their streak of LMS race wins ended after two accidents involving both cars. The accidents not only allowed the Audis to win the race, but also allowed Audi to secure the Drivers, Teams, and Constructors Championships, titles Peugeot had led all season.

After their loss in the LMS, Peugeot announced their intent to bring two of their 908s to North America to compete in the American Le Mans Series Petit Le Mans at Road Atlanta. Drivers Christian Klien and Alexander Wurz would have rejoined the squad to face Audi's North American R10s. However, because of accident damage to the 908s at Silverstone, Peugeot later opted to bring only one car. The sole 908 qualified in pole position and led several times over the race, but finished only 4.5 seconds behind the North American Audi team.

=== 2009 ===
Two 908s were entered at the 2009 Sebring 12 Hours up against the new Audi R15s. The lead change kept swapping until the R15 emerged just 22 seconds ahead of the Peugeot. The new R15s still lacked the capability to double-stint.

Four 908s were entered into the 2009 24 Hours of Le Mans, three by Peugeot, and a 2008 model by Pescarolo which crashed at night. The cars #9 and #8 took the first two places, 16 years after Peugeot's last win. Together with the sixth-placed #7, they performed a formation finish, crossing the line with all three cars line-astern.

Peugeot continued to challenge the Audi R15s at the 2009 Petit Le Mans. Team Peugeot Total entered two cars and won the rain soaked race while leading only 10% of the race laps. Because of the Le Mans victory Peugeot contested the race in 2010 with the numbers 1-2-3.

=== 2010 ===
Peugeot entered two cars for the 2010 12 Hours of Sebring, scoring a 1-2 finish to take their first victory at Sebring and finishing first and second in every official session in the run-up to the race. At Le Castellet, the Oreca Peugeot's airjacks failed to come off, falling 8 laps behind the Audi. The Audi continue to push, and in the end they got the better performance out of the Oreca, a margin of 10 laps. Peugeot fielded 3 cars at the 2010 Spa 1000km and the 2010 24 Hours of Le Mans, along with the Oreca Peugeot. In the Spa race, the #3 908 finished 1st, the #2 2nd and the #1 4th, while the Oreca crashed out four laps into the race.

In the 2010 24 Hours of Le Mans, the Peugeots took the top four spots in qualifying (including the Oreca #4 in 4th); however, problems on all four cars - first suspension damage on the pole-sitting #3, then three related engine issues - the #2, the #1 and the Oreca #4 - forced all of the Peugeots to retire before the end of the race. This would mark the first time that none of the Peugeot 908s finished at the end of the 24-hour classic. Proving its reliability compared to the 908's engine issues, Audi's revised R15 TDI plus swept the podium while breaking a new distance record previously set in 1971, despite the four 908s ran faster in a single lap than any of the three R15s. A post-race analysis found out that the #3 had a suspension mounting point separating from the carbon fiber tub, while the other three (#1, #2, #4) had failures of the new titanium connecting rods that caused the engine failures. This race was also run in perfectly dry weather allowing for incredibly fast qualifying-pace lap times. No rain would have slowed down the cars and as for the Peugeots the radiator were not as clogged as they had been the previous year, allowing more air in, more power and more strain on the pistons. Peugeot did prove themselves to be the fastest ever LMP car with Loïc Duval setting a 3:19.000 in the race and the #1 car chasing down the leading #9 Audi from 3 laps down to a mere minute.

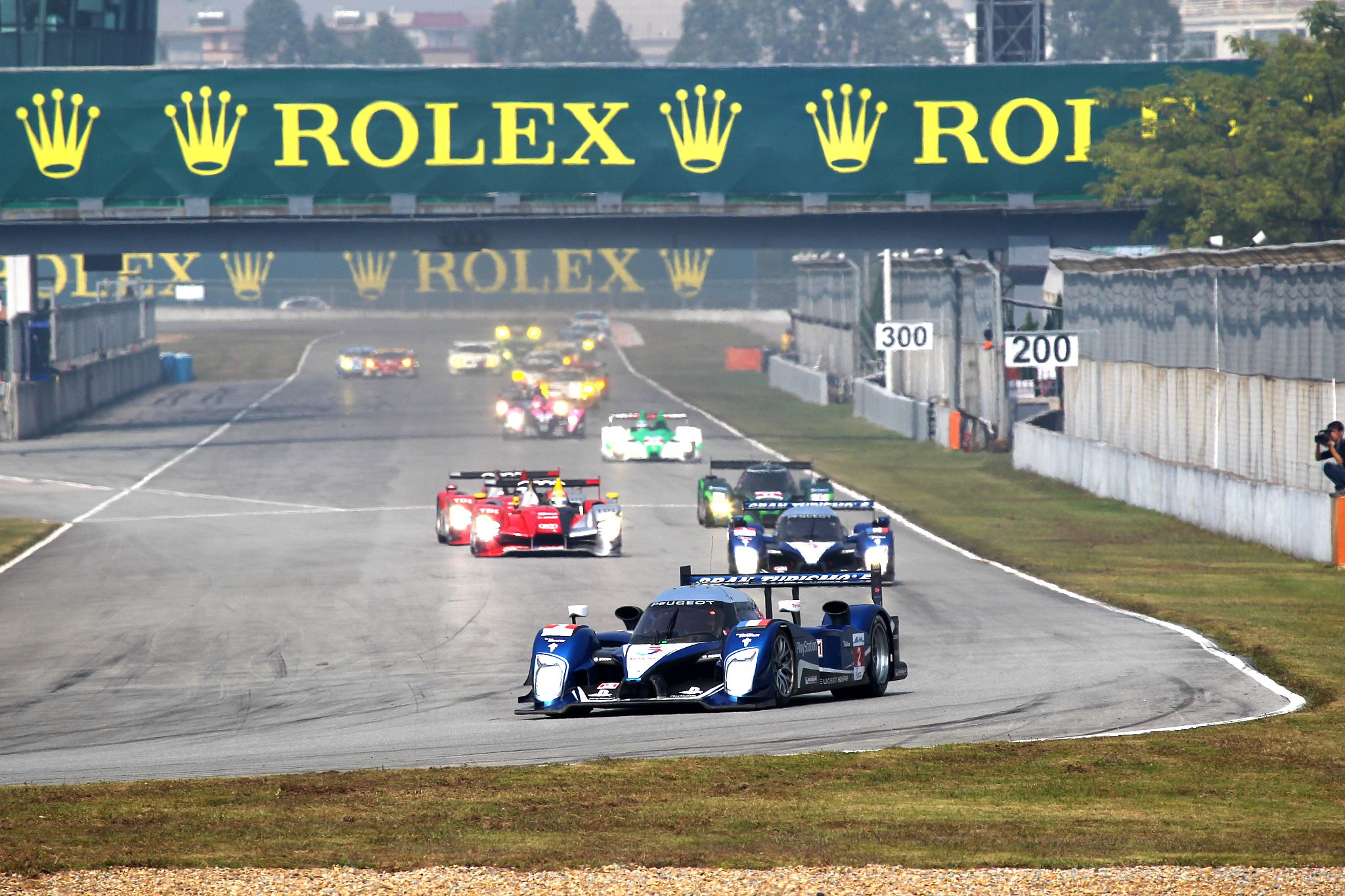
The 908 of Franck Montagny and Stéphane Sarrazin leads the field at the start of the 2010 1000 km of Zhuhai. Montagny and Sarrazin won the race to seal the Teams' and Manufacturers' Cup for Peugeot.

Peugeot entered two cars at the 2010 1000 km of Silverstone and won the race. Peugeot entered two cars at the 2010 Petit Le Mans, qualifying 1-2 for the race, and finishing 1-2 ahead of the two Audi R15s. The 908's last race as a factory team ended well with a controversial team-work victory by the #2 908 at the 2010 1000 km of Zhuhai. Peugeot finished off the year winning the Le Mans Series LMP1 teams championship by Oreca as well as winning the ILMC LMP1 championship.

=== 2011 ===
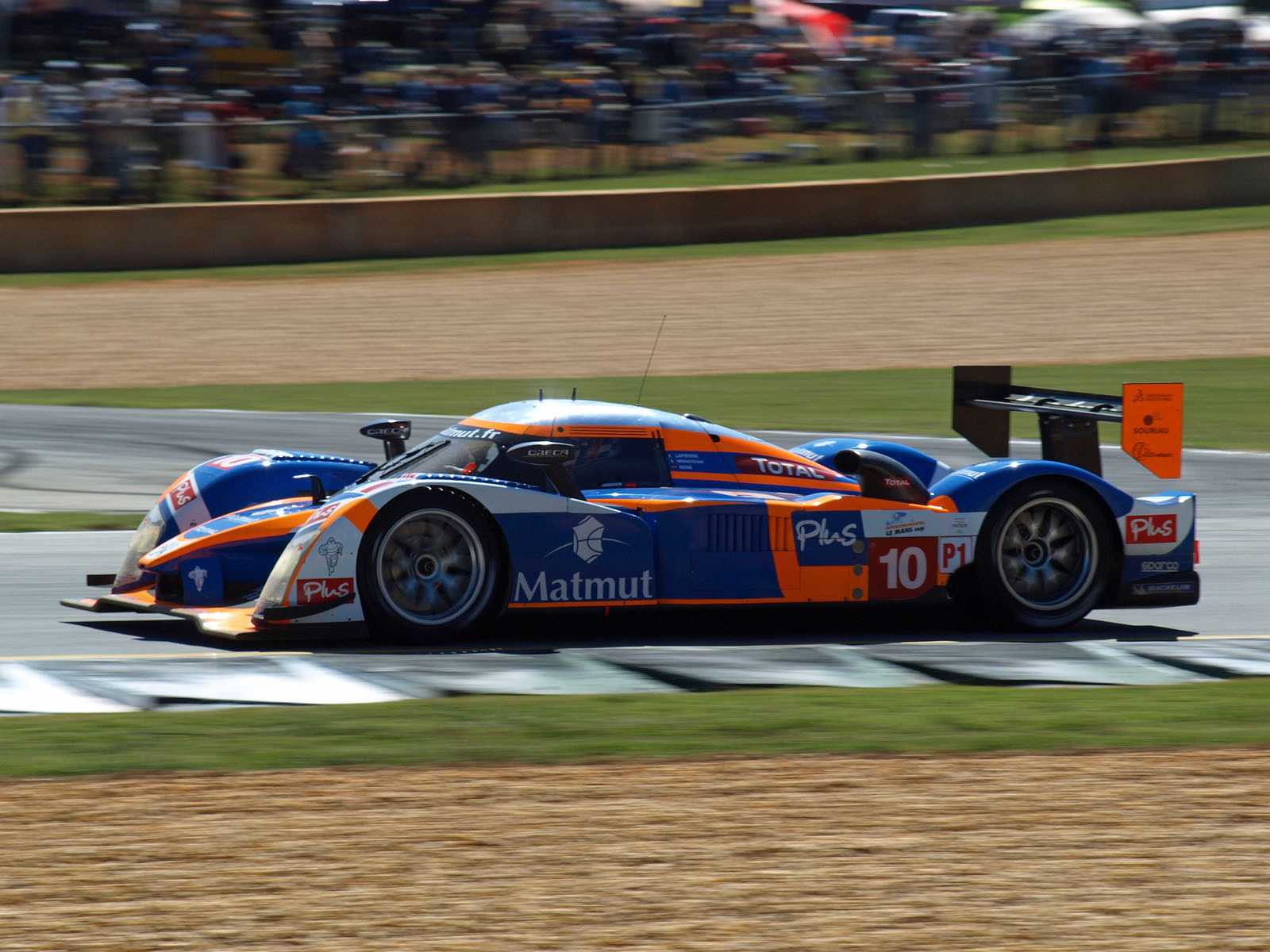
Lapierre driving the No. 10 908 HDi FAP during the 2011 Petit Le Mans.

Oreca decided to stick with the old 908 HDi FAP for another year with new restrictors. This would be the last year for the 908 HDi FAP. Despite this, Oreca managed to win the 2011 12 Hours of Sebring ahead of factory Peugeot, Audi and HPD. At the 2011 24 Hours of Le Mans, the 908 HDi FAP run by Oreca finished the race fifth behind the three new factory Peugeot 908s and the winning Audi R18. Oreca also managed to finish 2nd at the Petit Le Mans behind the surviving factory Peugeot 908.

=== Peugeot 908 ===
New 2011 Le Mans Prototype regulations rendered the first-generation 908 obsolete; Peugeot began development of a new prototype, known as the 90X, in late 2009. Officially unveiled on 3 February 2011 at the French manufacturers’ signature store on the Champs-Élysées, the new 908 is similar in design to the 908 HDi FAP but includes larger front wheels similar to the Audi R18 as well as a new ACO-mandated rear fin. The new 908 features a 3.7 litres (230 cu in) V8 that remains diesel-fueled. However, Oreca continued to run with the old 908 HDi FAP in 2011. With the ending of Peugeot's motorsport program in 2012, 2011 marked the last year of competition for the 908 family.

== Complete racing results ==
=== Intercontinental Le Mans Cup ===
(key) Races in bold indicates pole position. Races in italics indicates fastest lap.

Year	Entrant	Class	No	Results			Championship	
Year	Entrant	Class	No	1	2	3	Pts.	Pos.
2010	(France) Team Peugeot Total	LMP1		SIL	ATL	ZHU	140	1st
2010	(France) Team Peugeot Total	LMP1	1/7/2	1	2	4	140	1st
2010	(France) Team Peugeot Total	LMP1	4/8/1	2	1	1	140	1st

=== 24 Hours of Le Mans ===
Year	Entrant	#	Drivers	Class	Laps	Pos.	Class Pos.
2007	(France) Team Peugeot Total	7	(France) Nicolas Minassian (Canada) Jacques Villeneuve (Spain) Marc Gené	LMP1	338	DNF	DNF
2007	(France) Team Peugeot Total	8	(France) Stéphane Sarrazin (Portugal) Pedro Lamy (France) Sébastien Bourdais	LMP1	359	**2nd**	**2nd**
2008	(France) Team Peugeot Total	7	(France) Nicolas Minassian (Spain) Marc Gené (Canada) Jacques Villeneuve	LMP1	381	**2nd**	**2nd**
2008	(France) Team Peugeot Total	8	(France) Stéphane Sarrazin (Portugal) Pedro Lamy (Austria) Alexander Wurz	LMP1	368	5th	5th
2008	(France) Peugeot Sport Total	9	(France) Franck Montagny (Brazil) Ricardo Zonta (Austria) Christian Klien	LMP1	379	**3rd**	**3rd**
2009	(France) Team Peugeot Total	7	(France) Nicolas Minassian (Portugal) Pedro Lamy (Austria) Christian Klien	LMP1	369	6th	6th
2009	(France) Team Peugeot Total	8	(France) Franck Montagny (France) Sébastien Bourdais (France) Stéphane Sarrazin	LMP1	381	**2nd**	**2nd**
2009	(France) Peugeot Sport Total	9	(Australia) David Brabham (Spain) Marc Gené (Austria) Alexander Wurz	LMP1	382	**1st**	**1st**
2009	(France) Pescarolo Sport	17	(France) Simon Pagenaud (France) Jean-Christophe Boullion (France) Benoît Tréluyer	LMP1	210	DNF	DNF
2010	(France) Team Peugeot Total	1	(Austria) Alexander Wurz (Spain) Marc Gené (United Kingdom) Anthony Davidson	LMP1	360	DNF	DNF
2010	(France) Team Peugeot Total	2	(France) Nicolas Minassian (France) Stéphane Sarrazin (France) Franck Montagny	LMP1	264	DNF	DNF
2010	(France) Peugeot Sport Total	3	(France) Sébastien Bourdais (Portugal) Pedro Lamy (France) Simon Pagenaud	LMP1	38	DNF	DNF
2010	(France) Team Oreca Matmut	4	(France) Olivier Panis (France) Nicolas Lapierre (France) Loïc Duval	LMP1	373	DNF	DNF
2011	(France) Team Oreca Matmut	10	(France) Olivier Panis (France) Nicolas Lapierre (France) Loïc Duval	LMP1	339	5th	5th

== Peugeot 908 RC ==
The 908 RC is a luxury four-door limousine concept car equipped with the 5.5L V12 HDi diesel engine from the 908 race car installed centrally and transversally.

== See also ==
- KERS
- Diesel automobile racing
