= PSA HDi engine =

Motor Vehicle engine

The PSA Group sells a variety of diesel automobile engines with the HDi (high-pressure direct injection) designation. Earlier versions were exclusive to Peugeot and Citroën. In 1998, PSA entered into a joint venture with the Ford Motor Company to produce a range of new diesel engines. The joint venture makes identical engines which are fitted to a variety of vehicles from a range of car manufacturers. The engines are assembled in production plants in the cities of Trémery and Douvrin for PSA in France, at the Ford Dagenham plant in the UK, and Volvo Engine Plant in Skövde Sweden when Volvo was still under Ford ownership.

Half of the group's vehicles are fitted with an HDi diesel engine: in 2007 this amounted to approximately 1.8 million vehicles.

As a result of a cooperation between BMW Group and PSA, the MINI One D and the MINI Cooper D are also fitted with PSA-made HDi DV engines.

== 1.4 ==
The 1.4 L (1,398 cc) Diesel is part of the DV/DLD family and is, depending application, called the DV4 (PSA), or DLD-414 (Ford), or Suzuki Liana and Citroën C3 1.4 16v with 90PS.

== 1.5 ==
The 1.5 L (1,499 cc) Diesel is part of the DV/DLD family and is, depending application, called the DV5 (PSA), or DLD-415 (Ford).

== 1.6 ==
The 1.6 L (1,560 cc) Diesel is part of the DV/DLD family and is, depending application, called the DV6 (PSA), W16 (MINI), DLD-416 (Ford), 3WZ (Toyota).

90 PS and 110 PS versions are available. Though both intercooled, the major difference being that the 90 PS has a conventional waste-gated Mitsubishi MHI TD025 turbo charger, whilst the 110 PS uses a Garrett GT15V variable geometry (VNT) turbocharger. The 110 PS version of this engine can be ordered in an unprecedented variety of car models, representing either side of the motoring spectrum, ranging from the MINI Cooper D to the Volvo S80 1.6D DRIVe.

== 2.0 ==
The 2.0L, 8-valve DW10, 90 or 110 PS (66 or 81 kW), is part of the PSA EW/DW engine family. It is equipped with a fixed-geometry turbocharger. Initially available in the midsized models, such as the Citroën Xsara and Xantia and Peugeot 306 and 406. It was soon spread across the PSA range, such as the LCVs, while a 16-valve version, with 109 PS (80 kW), was used in the large MPVs built in association with Fiat.

Suzuki was a customer for these powerplants, using them in the European Vitara and Grand Vitara.

The PSA/Ford joint venture DW10B & DW10C engines use the same cylinder casing with a 16-valve head.

- Citroën C5, Citroën C6
- Peugeot 407, Peugeot 408, Peugeot 5008
- Ford Focus, 2007 Ford Mondeo, Ford Galaxy, Ford C-Max, Ford S-Max
- Volvo C30, Volvo S40, Volvo V50

== 2.7 V6 ==
The 2.7L, 24-valve DOHC biturbo V6 DT17 is also produced by the Ford/PSA joint venture, and is also solely built in Dagenham. A variant of this engine for the use in Land-Rover, the so-called 'LR-TDV6 Diesel engine' rd at their Dunton and Whitley research centres.

Another version, with only a single turbo is fitted to Australian made Ford Territory since 2011. Territory is a 5 or 7 seat Falcon based SUV vehicle, available in rear or all wheel drive. Territory production ceased in October 2016 when Ford closed its Australian manufacturing facility.

== 3.0 V6 ==
The 3.0 L, 24-valve DOHC biturbo V6 DT20 has replaced the 2.7 V6 HDi on PSA cars starting from 2009. PSA stopped its production in 2009.

== 5.5 V12 (FAP) ==
The 5.5L V12 engine with FAP (Filtre à particules, French for particulate filter) was built by Peugeot Sport for competition purposes. Initially this engine could power a MR 4-door sedan (908 RC), but car never reached series production. V12 was approved for use in LMP1 class from 2007 to 2010, and it was used by works team in ELMS, ALMS and 24 Hours of Le Mans.

Applications

- Peugeot 908 RC
- Peugeot 908 HDi FAP (includes 2006 concept car, 2007-2010 race cars and cancelled 2008 908 HY)

== See also ==
- List of PSA engines
- Ford Duratorq engine
- PSA EW/DW engine
