= 2011 American Le Mans Series =

41st season of the racing series organized by IMSA

Seasons
- ← 2010 2012 →

The 2011 American Le Mans Series season was a multi-event motor racing series for sports racing cars which conform to the technical regulations laid out by the International Motor Sports Association for the American Le Mans Series. It was the thirteenth season of the American Le Mans Series, a sports car racing series that drew original inspiration from the types of racing cars that compete in the 24 Hours of Le Mans, and the 41st season for the IMSA GT Championship, as this series traces its lineage to the 1971 IMSA GT Championship. The full title of the 2011 series is "the American Le Mans Series presented by Tequila Patrón" to include the principal sponsor. The season began March 19, 2011 with the 12 Hours of Sebring and ended after nine rounds on October 1 with the Petit Le Mans.

While Lola-built sports cars dominated the upper racing positions in the faster LMP classes for sports prototype vehicles, their numbers continued to drop to the point where at the third round of the series at 2011 Northeast Grand Prix no LMP2 class cars were entered. The only growth in prototype numbers has been in spec racing class LMPC in which all class competitors use identical Oreca chassis powered by a Chevrolet engine.

The Lola-Mazda of the Dyson Racing Team and its drivers Chris Dyson and Guy Smith won the LMP1 class championship at the penultimate race at Mazda Raceway Laguna Seca, holding a 32-point gap over the Muscle Milk Motorsports team and driver Klaus Graf. Level 5 Motorsports ran unopposed for the majority of the season in LMP2 with their Lola-HPDs. Christophe Bouchut and Scott Tucker also wrapped up the championship early.

LMPC title remained live until the final race of the season where Genoa Racing's Eric Lux and the Core Autosport pair of Gunnar Jeannette and Ricardo González ended tied on points, and had the same number of second, third, fourth and fifth-place finishes.

In the Grand Touring classes, Rahal Letterman Lanigan Racing's BMW M3 GT2 driven by Dirk Müller and Joey Hand won the championship, taking three wins and three podiums. They wrapped up the class title a round early, having held a 33-point lead over the Chevrolet pair of Oliver Gavin and Jan Magnussen. Black Swan Racing driver Tim Pappas clinched the GTC spec racing class for Porsche 997s at the final round by winning the class.

== Schedule ==
On August 22, 2010, IMSA announced an initial 2011 calendar with ten events, expanding from nine in 2010. Two unnamed events were added to the calendar, while the series race at Miller Motorsports Park in Utah was not retained. A race in the Bricktown section of Oklahoma City had been proposed, but was rejected by the city's council. It was announced in February 2010 that the Baltimore Grand Prix street race was being taken into consideration for one of the series' new rounds. The race was confirmed on September 1, 2010. All races this season were seen live on ESPN3.com, and on delay on ESPN2 and ABC.

Two rounds on the 2011 schedule, the 12 Hours of Sebring and Petit Le Mans, also served as part of the 2011 Intercontinental Le Mans Cup.

Rnd	Race	Length	Circuit	Location	Date
	American Le Mans Series Winter Test		Sebring International Raceway	Sebring, Florida	February 9–10
1	59th Mobil 1 12 Hours of Sebring	12 Hours	Sebring International Raceway	Sebring, Florida	March 19
2	Tequila Patrón American Le Mans Series at Long Beach	2 Hours	Long Beach Street Circuit	Long Beach, California	April 16
3	American Le Mans Northeast Grand Prix	2 Hours 45 Minutes	Lime Rock Park	Lakeville, Connecticut	July 9
4	Grand Prix of Mosport	2 Hours 45 Minutes	Mosport International Raceway	Bowmanville, Ontario	July 24
5	Mid-Ohio Sports Car Challenge	2 Hours 45 Minutes	Mid-Ohio Sports Car Course	Lexington, Ohio	August 6
6	Road Race Showcase	4 Hours	Road America	Elkhart Lake, Wisconsin	August 20
7	Baltimore Grand Prix	2 Hours	Baltimore Street Circuit	Baltimore, Maryland	September 3
8	American Le Mans Monterey	6 Hours	Mazda Raceway Laguna Seca	Monterey, California	September 17
9	14th Annual Petit Le Mans	1,000 mi (1,600 km) or 10 Hours	Road Atlanta	Braselton, Georgia	October 1

== Entry list ==
=== Le Mans Prototype 1 (LMP1) ===
Team	Chassis	Engine	Tire	No.	Drivers	Round(s)
(United Kingdom) Aston Martin Racing	Lola-Aston Martin B09/60	Aston Martin AM04 6.0 L V12	M	007	(Mexico) Adrián Fernández	8-9
(United Kingdom) Aston Martin Racing	Lola-Aston Martin B09/60	Aston Martin AM04 6.0 L V12	M	007	(Germany) Stefan Mücke	8-9
(United Kingdom) Aston Martin Racing	Lola-Aston Martin B09/60	Aston Martin AM04 6.0 L V12	M	007	(Switzerland) Harold Primat	8-9
(United States) Highcroft Racing	HPD ARX-01e	HPD AL7R 3.4 L V8	D	01	(Australia) David Brabham	1
(United States) Highcroft Racing	HPD ARX-01e	HPD AL7R 3.4 L V8	D	01	(Scotland) Marino Franchitti	1
(United States) Highcroft Racing	HPD ARX-01e	HPD AL7R 3.4 L V8	D	01	(France) Simon Pagenaud	1
(United States) Muscle Milk Aston Martin Racing	Lola-Aston Martin B08/62	Aston Martin AM04 6.0 L V12	M	061; 68	(Germany) Klaus Graf	All
(United States) Muscle Milk Aston Martin Racing	Lola-Aston Martin B08/62	Aston Martin AM04 6.0 L V12	M	061; 68	(Germany) Lucas Luhr	All
(United States) Muscle Milk Aston Martin Racing	Lola-Aston Martin B08/62	Aston Martin AM04 6.0 L V12	M	061; 68	(United States) Greg Pickett	1, 9
(United States) Dyson Racing Team	Lola B09/86	Mazda MZR-R 2.0 L Turbo I4 (Isobutanol)	D	016 1; 16 8	(United States) Chris Dyson	All
(United States) Dyson Racing Team	Lola B09/86	Mazda MZR-R 2.0 L Turbo I4 (Isobutanol)	D	016 1; 16 8	(United Kingdom) Guy Smith	All
(United States) Dyson Racing Team	Lola B09/86	Mazda MZR-R 2.0 L Turbo I4 (Isobutanol)	D	016 1; 16 8	(United States) Jay Cochran	1, 8-9
(United States) Oryx Dyson Racing	Lola B09/86	Mazda MZR-R 2.0 L Turbo I4 (Isobutanol)	D	20	(United Arab Emirates) Humaid Al Masaood	3-9
(United States) Oryx Dyson Racing	Lola B09/86	Mazda MZR-R 2.0 L Turbo I4 (Isobutanol)	D	20	(United Kingdom) Steven Kane	3-9
(United States) Oryx Dyson Racing	Lola B09/86	Mazda MZR-R 2.0 L Turbo I4 (Isobutanol)	D	20	(United States) Butch Leitzinger	8-9
(Germany) Audi Sport Joest Racing	Audi R15 TDI plus	Audi TDI 5.5 L Turbo V10 (Diesel)	M	1	(Germany) Timo Bernhard	1, 9
(Germany) Audi Sport Joest Racing	Audi R15 TDI plus	Audi TDI 5.5 L Turbo V10 (Diesel)	M	1	(France) Romain Dumas	1, 9
(Germany) Audi Sport Joest Racing	Audi R15 TDI plus	Audi TDI 5.5 L Turbo V10 (Diesel)	M	1	(Germany) Mike Rockenfeller	1
(Germany) Audi Sport Joest Racing	Audi R15 TDI plus	Audi TDI 5.5 L Turbo V10 (Diesel)	M	1	(Switzerland) Marcel Fässler	9
(Germany) Audi Sport Joest Racing	Audi R15 TDI plus	Audi TDI 5.5 L Turbo V10 (Diesel)	M	2	(Denmark) Tom Kristensen	1, 9
(Germany) Audi Sport Joest Racing	Audi R15 TDI plus	Audi TDI 5.5 L Turbo V10 (Diesel)	M	2	(United Kingdom) Allan McNish	1, 9
(Germany) Audi Sport Joest Racing	Audi R15 TDI plus	Audi TDI 5.5 L Turbo V10 (Diesel)	M	2	(Italy) Rinaldo Capello	1, 9
(France) Peugeot Sport Total	Peugeot 908	Peugeot HDi 3.7 L Turbo V8 (Diesel)	M	7	(United Kingdom) Anthony Davidson	1, 9
(France) Peugeot Sport Total	Peugeot 908	Peugeot HDi 3.7 L Turbo V8 (Diesel)	M	7	(Spain) Marc Gené	1
(France) Peugeot Sport Total	Peugeot 908	Peugeot HDi 3.7 L Turbo V8 (Diesel)	M	7	(Austria) Alexander Wurz	1
(France) Peugeot Sport Total	Peugeot 908	Peugeot HDi 3.7 L Turbo V8 (Diesel)	M	7	(France) Sébastien Bourdais	9
(France) Peugeot Sport Total	Peugeot 908	Peugeot HDi 3.7 L Turbo V8 (Diesel)	M	7	(France) Simon Pagenaud	9
(France) Peugeot Sport Total	Peugeot 908	Peugeot HDi 3.7 L Turbo V8 (Diesel)	M	8	(Portugal) Pedro Lamy	1, 9
(France) Peugeot Sport Total	Peugeot 908	Peugeot HDi 3.7 L Turbo V8 (Diesel)	M	8	(France) Franck Montagny	1, 9
(France) Peugeot Sport Total	Peugeot 908	Peugeot HDi 3.7 L Turbo V8 (Diesel)	M	8	(France) Stéphane Sarrazin	1, 9
(France) Team Oreca-Matmut	Peugeot 908 HDi FAP	Peugeot HDi 5.5 L Turbo V12 (Diesel)	M	10	(France) Nicolas Lapierre	1, 9
(France) Team Oreca-Matmut	Peugeot 908 HDi FAP	Peugeot HDi 5.5 L Turbo V12 (Diesel)	M	10	(France) Loïc Duval	1
(France) Team Oreca-Matmut	Peugeot 908 HDi FAP	Peugeot HDi 5.5 L Turbo V12 (Diesel)	M	10	(France) Olivier Panis	1
(France) Team Oreca-Matmut	Peugeot 908 HDi FAP	Peugeot HDi 5.5 L Turbo V12 (Diesel)	M	10	(Spain) Marc Gené	9
(France) Team Oreca-Matmut	Peugeot 908 HDi FAP	Peugeot HDi 5.5 L Turbo V12 (Diesel)	M	10	(France) Nicolas Minassian	9
(Switzerland) Rebellion Racing	Lola B10/60	Toyota RV8KLM 3.4 L V8	M	12	(Switzerland) Neel Jani	1, 9
(Switzerland) Rebellion Racing	Lola B10/60	Toyota RV8KLM 3.4 L V8	M	12	(France) Nicolas Prost	1, 9
(Switzerland) Rebellion Racing	Lola B10/60	Toyota RV8KLM 3.4 L V8	M	12	(Netherlands) Jeroen Bleekemolen	1
(Switzerland) Rebellion Racing	Lola B10/60	Toyota RV8KLM 3.4 L V8	M	12	(Italy) Andrea Belicchi	9
(United States) Autocon	Lola B06/10	AER P32C 4.0 L Turbo V8 (Isobutanol)	D	125; 0121	(Canada) Tony Burgess	4-9
(United States) Autocon	Lola B06/10	AER P32C 4.0 L Turbo V8 (Isobutanol)	D	125; 0121	(United States) Chris McMurry	4-9
(United States) Autocon	Lola B06/10	AER P32C 4.0 L Turbo V8 (Isobutanol)	D	125; 0121	(United States) Bryan Willman	8-9
(France) OAK Racing	OAK Pescarolo 01	Judd DB 3.4 L V8	D	15	(France) Matthieu Lahaye	1, 9
(France) OAK Racing	OAK Pescarolo 01	Judd DB 3.4 L V8	D	15	(France) Guillaume Moreau	1, 9
(France) OAK Racing	OAK Pescarolo 01	Judd DB 3.4 L V8	D	15	(France) Pierre Ragues	1, 9
(France) OAK Racing	OAK Pescarolo 01	Judd DB 3.4 L V8	D	24	(France) Jean-François Yvon	1, 9
(France) OAK Racing	OAK Pescarolo 01	Judd DB 3.4 L V8	D	24	(Poland) Richard Hein	1
(France) OAK Racing	OAK Pescarolo 01	Judd DB 3.4 L V8	D	24	(France) Jacques Nicolet	1
(France) OAK Racing	OAK Pescarolo 01	Judd DB 3.4 L V8	D	24	(France) Olivier Pla	9
(France) OAK Racing	OAK Pescarolo 01	Judd DB 3.4 L V8	D	24	(France) Alexandre Prémat	9

=== Le Mans Prototype 2 (LMP2) ===
Team	Chassis	Engine	Tire	No.	Drivers	Round(s)
(United States) United Autosports	OAK Pescarolo 01	Judd-BMW HK 3.6 L V8	D	22	(United States) Zak Brown	9
(United States) United Autosports	OAK Pescarolo 01	Judd-BMW HK 3.6 L V8	D	22	(Sweden) Stefan Johansson	9
(United States) United Autosports	OAK Pescarolo 01	Judd-BMW HK 3.6 L V8	D	22	(South Africa) Mark Patterson	9
(France) Signatech Nissan	Oreca 03	Nissan VK45DE 4.5 L V8	D 1 M 1	26	(France) Franck Mailleux	1, 9
(France) Signatech Nissan	Oreca 03	Nissan VK45DE 4.5 L V8	D 1 M 1	26	(Spain) Lucas Ordoñez	1, 9
(France) Signatech Nissan	Oreca 03	Nissan VK45DE 4.5 L V8	D 1 M 1	26	(France) Soheil Ayari	1
(France) Signatech Nissan	Oreca 03	Nissan VK45DE 4.5 L V8	D 1 M 1	26	(France) Jean-Karl Vernay	9
(United States) Level 5 Motorsports	Lola B08/80 1 Lola B11/40 1 HPD ARX-01g 1	HPD HR28TT 2.8 L Turbo V6	M	33	(France) Christophe Bouchut	1-2, 9
(United States) Level 5 Motorsports	Lola B08/80 1 Lola B11/40 1 HPD ARX-01g 1	HPD HR28TT 2.8 L Turbo V6	M	33	(United States) Scott Tucker	1-2, 9
(United States) Level 5 Motorsports	Lola B08/80 1 Lola B11/40 1 HPD ARX-01g 1	HPD HR28TT 2.8 L Turbo V6	M	33	(Portugal) João Barbosa	1, 9
(United States) Level 5 Motorsports	Lola B11/40 2 HPD ARX-01g 1	HPD HR28TT 2.8 L Turbo V6	M	055 3; 55 1	(Mexico) Luis Díaz	1, 6, 8-9
(United States) Level 5 Motorsports	Lola B11/40 2 HPD ARX-01g 1	HPD HR28TT 2.8 L Turbo V6	M	055 3; 55 1	(United States) Ryan Hunter-Reay	1, 9
(United States) Level 5 Motorsports	Lola B11/40 2 HPD ARX-01g 1	HPD HR28TT 2.8 L Turbo V6	M	055 3; 55 1	(France) Christophe Bouchut	6, 8
(United States) Level 5 Motorsports	Lola B11/40 2 HPD ARX-01g 1	HPD HR28TT 2.8 L Turbo V6	M	055 3; 55 1	(United States) Scott Tucker	6, 8
(United States) Level 5 Motorsports	Lola B11/40 2 HPD ARX-01g 1	HPD HR28TT 2.8 L Turbo V6	M	055 3; 55 1	(United Kingdom) Marino Franchitti	9
(France) OAK Racing	OAK Pescarolo 01	Judd-BMW HK 3.6 L V8	D	35	(France) Patrice Lafargue	1, 9
(France) OAK Racing	OAK Pescarolo 01	Judd-BMW HK 3.6 L V8	D	35	(France) Frédéric Da Rocha	1, 9
(France) OAK Racing	OAK Pescarolo 01	Judd-BMW HK 3.6 L V8	D	35	(Italy) Andrea Barlesi	1
(France) OAK Racing	OAK Pescarolo 01	Judd-BMW HK 3.6 L V8	D	35	(France) Jacques Nicolet	9

=== Le Mans Prototype Challenge (LMPC) ===
Note: All entires utilized the Oreca FLM09 chassis, the Chevrolet LS3 6.2 L V8 engine, and Michelin tires. All entries also had an additional "0" added to their car number for the 12 Hours of Sebring.

Team	No.	Drivers	Round(s)
(United States) CORE Autosport	05	(United States) Jon Bennett	All
(United States) CORE Autosport	05	(United States) Frankie Montecalvo	All
(United States) CORE Autosport	05	(United Kingdom) Ryan Dalziel	1, 9
(United States) CORE Autosport	05	(United Kingdom) Andy Wallace	8
(United States) CORE Autosport	06	(United States) Gunnar Jeannette	All
(United States) CORE Autosport	06	(Mexico) Ricardo González	All
(United States) CORE Autosport	06	(Mexico) Rudy Junco Jr.	1, 8-9
(United States) Performance Tech Motorsports	18	(United States) Jarrett Boon	1, 3-9
(United States) Performance Tech Motorsports	18	(United States) Anthony Nicolosi	1, 3-9
(United States) Performance Tech Motorsports	18	(Germany) Jan-Dirk Lueders	1, 8-9
(United States) Genoa Racing	36	(United States) Dane Cameron	1
(United States) Genoa Racing	36	(United States) Michael Guasch	1
(United States) Genoa Racing	36	(Germany) Jens Petersen	1
(United States) Genoa Racing	63 7; 063 2	(Ecuador) Elton Julian	All
(United States) Genoa Racing	63 7; 063 2	(United States) Eric Lux	1-3, 7-9
(United States) Genoa Racing	63 7; 063 2	(Germany) Christian Zugel	1, 4-6, 9
(United States) Intersport Racing	37	(United States) Jon Field	3-6
(United States) Intersport Racing	37	(Puerto Rico) Ricardo Vera	4, 8
(United States) Intersport Racing	37	(United States) Tomy Drissi	7-8
(United States) Intersport Racing	37	(Australia) James Kovacic	3
(United States) Intersport Racing	37	(United States) Clint Field	5
(United States) Intersport Racing	37	(United States) James French	6
(United States) Intersport Racing	37	(United States) Michael Marsal	6
(United States) Intersport Racing	37	(Canada) Kyle Marcelli	7
(United States) Intersport Racing	89	(Canada) Kyle Marcelli	1-6, 8-9
(United States) Intersport Racing	89	(United States) Tomy Drissi	1-3, 5-6, 9
(United States) Intersport Racing	89	(United States) Chapman Ducote	4, 7-9
(United States) Intersport Racing	89	(United States) David Ducote	7-8
(United States) Intersport Racing	89	(Italy) Luca Moro	8
(United Kingdom) Iconik Energy Drinks WRO	38	(France) Olivier Lombard	1
(United Kingdom) Iconik Energy Drinks WRO	38	(Italy) Luca Moro	1
(United Kingdom) Iconik Energy Drinks WRO	38	(United Kingdom) Johnny Mowlem	1
(United States) PR1/Mathiasen Motorsports	52	(United States) Ken Dobson	1, 7-9
(United States) PR1/Mathiasen Motorsports	52	(United Kingdom) Ryan Lewis	1, 7, 9
(United States) PR1/Mathiasen Motorsports	52	(France) Henri Richard	1, 8-9
(United States) PR1/Mathiasen Motorsports	52	(United States) David Cheng	5-6
(United States) PR1/Mathiasen Motorsports	52	(Mexico) Javier Echeverría	5-6
(United States) PR1/Mathiasen Motorsports	52	(United States) Miles Maroney	2
(United States) PR1/Mathiasen Motorsports	52	(United States) Rene Villeneuve	8

=== Grand Touring (GT) ===
Team	Chassis	Engine	Tire	No.	Drivers	Round(s)
(United States) Extreme Speed Motorsports	Ferrari 458 Italia GT2	Ferrari 4.5 L V8	M	01^{#}	(United States) Johannes van Overbeek	All
(United States) Extreme Speed Motorsports	Ferrari 458 Italia GT2	Ferrari 4.5 L V8	M	01^{#}	(United States) Scott Sharp	All
(United States) Extreme Speed Motorsports	Ferrari 458 Italia GT2	Ferrari 4.5 L V8	M	01^{#}	(Germany) Dominik Farnbacher	1, 9
(United States) Extreme Speed Motorsports	Ferrari 458 Italia GT2	Ferrari 4.5 L V8	M	02^{#}	(United States) Ed Brown	All
(United States) Extreme Speed Motorsports	Ferrari 458 Italia GT2	Ferrari 4.5 L V8	M	02^{#}	(United States) Guy Cosmo	All
(United States) Extreme Speed Motorsports	Ferrari 458 Italia GT2	Ferrari 4.5 L V8	M	02^{#}	(United Kingdom) Rob Bell	1, 9
(United States) Robertson Racing	Ford GT-R Mk. VII	Ford Cammer 5.0 L V8	M	04^{#}	(United States) Anthony Lazzaro	1, 3-6
(United States) Robertson Racing	Ford GT-R Mk. VII	Ford Cammer 5.0 L V8	M	04^{#}	(United States) David Murry	1, 3-6
(United States) Robertson Racing	Ford GT-R Mk. VII	Ford Cammer 5.0 L V8	M	04^{#}	(United States) Colin Braun	1
(United States) Robertson Racing	Ford GT-R Mk. VII	Ford Cammer 5.0 L V8	M	40^{#}	(United States) Andrea Robertson	1, 3-6, 9
(United States) Robertson Racing	Ford GT-R Mk. VII	Ford Cammer 5.0 L V8	M	40^{#}	(United States) David Robertson	1, 3-6
(United States) Robertson Racing	Ford GT-R Mk. VII	Ford Cammer 5.0 L V8	M	40^{#}	(United States) Boris Said	1
(United States) Robertson Racing	Ford GT-R Mk. VII	Ford Cammer 5.0 L V8	M	40^{#}	(United States) David Murry	9
(United States) Robertson Racing	Ford GT-R Mk. VII	Ford Cammer 5.0 L V8	M	40^{#}	(United States) Melanie Snow	9
(United States) West Yokohama Team	Lamborghini Gallardo LP560 GT2	Lamborghini 5.2 L V10	Y	08^{#}	(Netherlands) Nicky Pastorelli	1-2
(United States) West Yokohama Team	Lamborghini Gallardo LP560 GT2	Lamborghini 5.2 L V10	Y	08^{#}	(Germany) Dominik Schwager	1-2
(United States) Corvette Racing	Chevrolet Corvette C6.R	Chevrolet 5.5 L V8	M	3^{#}	(Monaco) Olivier Beretta	All
(United States) Corvette Racing	Chevrolet Corvette C6.R	Chevrolet 5.5 L V8	M	3^{#}	(United States) Tommy Milner	All
(United States) Corvette Racing	Chevrolet Corvette C6.R	Chevrolet 5.5 L V8	M	3^{#}	(Spain) Antonio García	1, 9
(United States) Corvette Racing	Chevrolet Corvette C6.R	Chevrolet 5.5 L V8	M	4^{#}	(United Kingdom) Oliver Gavin	All
(United States) Corvette Racing	Chevrolet Corvette C6.R	Chevrolet 5.5 L V8	M	4^{#}	(Denmark) Jan Magnussen	All
(United States) Corvette Racing	Chevrolet Corvette C6.R	Chevrolet 5.5 L V8	M	4^{#}	(United Kingdom) Richard Westbrook	1, 9
(United States) Team Falken Tire	Porsche 997 GT3-RSR	Porsche 4.0 L Flat-6	F	17^{#}	(Germany) Wolf Henzler	All
(United States) Team Falken Tire	Porsche 997 GT3-RSR	Porsche 4.0 L Flat-6	F	17^{#}	(United States) Bryan Sellers	All
(United States) Team Falken Tire	Porsche 997 GT3-RSR	Porsche 4.0 L Flat-6	F	17^{#}	(Austria) Martin Ragginger	1, 9
(United States) Flying Lizard Motorsports	Porsche 997 GT3-RSR	Porsche 4.0 L Flat-6	M	44^{$}	(United States) Seth Neiman	All
(United States) Flying Lizard Motorsports	Porsche 997 GT3-RSR	Porsche 4.0 L Flat-6	M	44^{$}	(Germany) Marco Holzer	1, 3-9
(United States) Flying Lizard Motorsports	Porsche 997 GT3-RSR	Porsche 4.0 L Flat-6	M	44^{$}	(United States) Darren Law	1-2, 9
(United States) Flying Lizard Motorsports	Porsche 997 GT3-RSR	Porsche 4.0 L Flat-6	M	45^{$}	(United States) Patrick Long	All
(United States) Flying Lizard Motorsports	Porsche 997 GT3-RSR	Porsche 4.0 L Flat-6	M	45^{$}	(Germany) Jörg Bergmeister	1, 4-9
(United States) Flying Lizard Motorsports	Porsche 997 GT3-RSR	Porsche 4.0 L Flat-6	M	45^{$}	(Germany) Marc Lieb	1
(United States) Flying Lizard Motorsports	Porsche 997 GT3-RSR	Porsche 4.0 L Flat-6	M	45^{$}	(France) Patrick Pilet	9
(United States) Paul Miller Racing	Porsche 997 GT3-RSR	Porsche 4.0 L Flat-6	Y	48^{#}	(United States) Bryce Miller	All
(United States) Paul Miller Racing	Porsche 997 GT3-RSR	Porsche 4.0 L Flat-6	Y	48^{#}	(Germany) Sascha Maassen	All
(United States) Paul Miller Racing	Porsche 997 GT3-RSR	Porsche 4.0 L Flat-6	Y	48^{#}	(Germany) René Rast	1
(United States) Paul Miller Racing	Porsche 997 GT3-RSR	Porsche 4.0 L Flat-6	Y	48^{#}	(France) Emmanuel Collard	9
(United States) Panoz Racing	Panoz Abruzzi	Chevrolet 6.5 L V8	M	50^{#}	(United Kingdom) Ian James	1, 4
(United States) Panoz Racing	Panoz Abruzzi	Chevrolet 6.5 L V8	M	50^{#}	(Switzerland) Benjamin Leuenberger	1
(United States) Panoz Racing	Panoz Abruzzi	Chevrolet 6.5 L V8	M	50^{#}	(Sweden) Edward Sandström	4
(Italy) AF Corse	Ferrari F430 GT2	Ferrari 4.0 L V8	M	51	(Italy) Gianmaria Bruni	1, 9
(Italy) AF Corse	Ferrari F430 GT2	Ferrari 4.0 L V8	M	51	(Italy) Giancarlo Fisichella	1, 9
(Italy) AF Corse	Ferrari F430 GT2	Ferrari 4.0 L V8	M	51	(Germany) Pierre Kaffer	1, 9
(Germany) BMW Motorsport	BMW M3 GT2	BMW 4.0 L V8	D	55	(United States) Bill Auberlen	All
(Germany) BMW Motorsport	BMW M3 GT2	BMW 4.0 L V8	D	55	(Germany) Dirk Werner	All
(Germany) BMW Motorsport	BMW M3 GT2	BMW 4.0 L V8	D	55	(Brazil) Augusto Farfus	1, 9
(Germany) BMW Motorsport	BMW M3 GT2	BMW 4.0 L V8	D	56	(United States) Joey Hand	All
(Germany) BMW Motorsport	BMW M3 GT2	BMW 4.0 L V8	D	56	(Germany) Dirk Müller	All
(Germany) BMW Motorsport	BMW M3 GT2	BMW 4.0 L V8	D	56	(United Kingdom) Andy Priaulx	1, 9
(France) Luxury Racing	Ferrari 458 Italia GT2	Ferrari 4.5 L V8	M	58	(Republic of Ireland) Ralph Firman	9
(France) Luxury Racing	Ferrari 458 Italia GT2	Ferrari 4.5 L V8	M	58	(France) David Hallyday	9
(France) Luxury Racing	Ferrari 458 Italia GT2	Ferrari 4.5 L V8	M	58	(France) François Jakubowski	9
(France) Luxury Racing	Ferrari 458 Italia GT2	Ferrari 4.5 L V8	M	59	(France) Frédéric Makowiecki	1, 9
(France) Luxury Racing	Ferrari 458 Italia GT2	Ferrari 4.5 L V8	M	59	(Monaco) Stéphane Ortelli	1, 9
(France) Luxury Racing	Ferrari 458 Italia GT2	Ferrari 4.5 L V8	M	59	(Switzerland) Jean-Denis Délétraz	1
(France) Luxury Racing	Ferrari 458 Italia GT2	Ferrari 4.5 L V8	M	59	(France) Anthony Beltoise	9
(United States) Risi Competizione	Ferrari 458 Italia GT2	Ferrari 4.5 L V8	M	62^{$}	(Finland) Toni Vilander	All
(United States) Risi Competizione	Ferrari 458 Italia GT2	Ferrari 4.5 L V8	M	62^{$}	(Finland) Mika Salo	1-8
(United States) Risi Competizione	Ferrari 458 Italia GT2	Ferrari 4.5 L V8	M	62^{$}	(Brazil) Jaime Melo	1, 9
(United States) Risi Competizione	Ferrari 458 Italia GT2	Ferrari 4.5 L V8	M	62^{$}	(Brazil) Raphael Matos	9
(Austria) Lotus Jetalliance	Lotus Evora GTE	Toyota (Cosworth) 4.0 L V6	M	64	(Denmark) Kasper Jensen	9
(Austria) Lotus Jetalliance	Lotus Evora GTE	Toyota (Cosworth) 4.0 L V6	M	64	(United Kingdom) Martin Rich	9
(Austria) Lotus Jetalliance	Lotus Evora GTE	Toyota (Cosworth) 4.0 L V6	M	64	(Netherlands) Oskar Slingerland	9
(Austria) Lotus Jetalliance	Lotus Evora GTE	Toyota (Cosworth) 4.0 L V6	M	65	(Denmark) David Heinemeier Hansson	9
(Austria) Lotus Jetalliance	Lotus Evora GTE	Toyota (Cosworth) 4.0 L V6	M	65	(United Kingdom) Johnny Mowlem	9
(Austria) Lotus Jetalliance	Lotus Evora GTE	Toyota (Cosworth) 4.0 L V6	M	65	(United Kingdom) James Rossiter	9
(United States) Jaguar RSR	Jaguar XKR GT2	Jaguar 5.0 L V8	D	98^{#}	(United States) P.J. Jones	1, 3-9
(United States) Jaguar RSR	Jaguar XKR GT2	Jaguar 5.0 L V8	D	98^{#}	(United States) Rocky Moran	1, 3-6, 9
(United States) Jaguar RSR	Jaguar XKR GT2	Jaguar 5.0 L V8	D	98^{#}	(Canada) Kenny Wilden	1
(United States) Jaguar RSR	Jaguar XKR GT2	Jaguar 5.0 L V8	D	98^{#}	(United States) Paul Gentilozzi	2
(United States) Jaguar RSR	Jaguar XKR GT2	Jaguar 5.0 L V8	D	98^{#}	(United States) Shane Lewis	9
(United States) Jaguar RSR	Jaguar XKR GT2	Jaguar 5.0 L V8	D	99^{#}	(Brazil) Bruno Junqueira	1-6, 8-9
(United States) Jaguar RSR	Jaguar XKR GT2	Jaguar 5.0 L V8	D	99^{#}	(Canada) Kenny Wilden	4-6, 8-9
(United States) Jaguar RSR	Jaguar XKR GT2	Jaguar 5.0 L V8	D	99^{#}	(Brazil) Cristiano da Matta	1-3
(United States) Jaguar RSR	Jaguar XKR GT2	Jaguar 5.0 L V8	D	99^{#}	(Spain) Oriol Servià	1
(United States) Jaguar RSR	Jaguar XKR GT2	Jaguar 5.0 L V8	D	99^{#}	(United Kingdom) Ian James	9

- #: Car number had an additional "0" for the 12 Hours of Sebring.
- $: Car number had an additional "0" for Sebring and Petit Le Mans.

=== Grand Touring Challenge (GTC) ===
Note: All entires utilized the Porsche 997 GT3 Cup chassis, the Porsche 3.8 L Flat-6 engine, and Yokohama tires. All entries also had an additional "0" added to their car number for the 12 Hours of Sebring.

Team	No.	Drivers	Round(s)
(United States) JDX Racing	11	(United States) Nick Ham	1-6, 8
(United States) JDX Racing	11	(United States) Chris Thompson	3-6
(United States) JDX Racing	11	(United States) Scott Blackett	1-2, 8
(United States) JDX Racing	11	(Canada) Chris Cumming	1, 8
(United States) Alex Job Racing	23	(United States) Bill Sweedler	All
(United States) Alex Job Racing	23	(United States) Brian Wong	1, 4-5, 8-9
(United States) Alex Job Racing	23	(United States) Leh Keen	1-2, 7, 9
(United States) Alex Job Racing	23	(United States) Butch Leitzinger	3
(United States) Alex Job Racing	23	(United States) Shane Lewis	8
(United States) NGT Motorsports	30	(United States) Henrique Cisneros	1, 6, 8
(United States) NGT Motorsports	30	(United States) Carlos Kauffmann	1, 6, 8
(United States) NGT Motorsports	30	(United Kingdom) Sean Edwards	1, 6
(United States) NGT Motorsports	30	(Austria) Martin Ragginger	8
(United States) Competition Motorsports	31	(United States) Michael Avenatti	8
(United States) Competition Motorsports	31	(United States) Bob Faieta	8
(United States) Competition Motorsports	31	(United States) Cort Wagner	8
(United States) GMG Racing	32	(United States) James Sofronas	1, 3, 6, 8
(United States) GMG Racing	32	(United States) Alex Welch	3, 6, 8
(United States) GMG Racing	32	(United States) Bret Curtis	1
(United States) GMG Racing	32	(Germany) Jan Seyffarth	1
(United States) Kelly-Moss Motorsports (United States) Green Hornet	34	(United States) Peter LeSaffre	1, 3, 5-8
(United States) Kelly-Moss Motorsports (United States) Green Hornet	34	(United States) Andrew Davis	1, 5-8
(United States) Kelly-Moss Motorsports (United States) Green Hornet	34	(United States) Bob Faieta	1
(United States) Kelly-Moss Motorsports (United States) Green Hornet	34	(Netherlands) Jaap van Lagen	3
(United States) Black Swan Racing	54	(United States) Tim Pappas	All
(United States) Black Swan Racing	54	(Netherlands) Jeroen Bleekemolen	5-9
(United States) Black Swan Racing	54	(Netherlands) Sebastiaan Bleekemolen	1-2, 8-9
(United States) Black Swan Racing	54	(Republic of Ireland) Damien Faulkner	1, 3-4
(United States) TRG	66	(United States) Duncan Ende	All
(United States) TRG	66	(United States) Spencer Pumpelly	All
(United States) TRG	66	(United States) Peter Ludwig	8-9
(United States) TRG	66	(Hong Kong) Alain Li	1
(United States) TRG	68	(South Africa) Dion von Moltke	All
(United States) TRG	68	(United States) Marc Bunting	4-5, 7
(United States) TRG	68	(United States) Jim Norman	1, 9
(United States) TRG	68	(Venezuela) Emilio Di Guida	6, 8
(United States) TRG	68	(United States) Peter Ludwig	1
(United States) TRG	68	(United States) Brendan Gaughan	2
(United States) TRG	68	(United States) Mike Piera	3
(United States) TRG	68	(United States) Kevin Buckler	8
(United States) TRG	68	(United States) Ben Keating	9
(United States) Magnus Racing	77	(United States) John Potter	1-2, 5, 7
(United States) Magnus Racing	77	(United States) Craig Stanton	1-2, 5, 7
(United States) Magnus Racing	77	(Hong Kong) Matthew Marsh	1
(United States) Porsche Napleton Racing	97	(Germany) Dominik Farnbacher	6
(United States) Porsche Napleton Racing	97	(Denmark) David Heinemeier Hansson	6

== Season results ==
The 12 Hours of Sebring and Petit Le Mans, as part of the 2011 Intercontinental Le Mans Cup, featured cars competing in the GTE-Am category alongside normal ALMS competitors in the GT2 category. Krohn Racing's Ferrari F430 won both of the races.

The winner represented here is the highest finisher of both classes combined.

Overall winners in bold.

Rnd	Circuit	LMP1 Winning Team	LMP2 Winning Team	LMPC Winning Team	GT Winning Team	GTC Winning Team	Results
Rnd	Circuit	LMP1 Winning Drivers	LMP2 Winning Drivers	LMPC Winning Drivers	GT Winning Drivers	GTC Winning Drivers	Results
1	Sebring	(France) **#10 Team Oreca Matmut**	(United States) #055 Level 5 Motorsports	(United States) #036 Genoa Racing	(United States) #56 BMW Team RLL	(United States) #054 Black Swan Racing	Results
1	Sebring	(France) **Nicolas Lapierre** (France) **Loïc Duval** (France) **Olivier Panis**	(United States) Ryan Hunter-Reay (Mexico) Luis Díaz	(Germany) Jens Petersen (United States) Dane Cameron (United States) Michael Guasch	(United Kingdom) Andy Priaulx (Germany) Dirk Müller (United States) Joey Hand	(United States) Tim Pappas (Netherlands) Sebastiaan Bleekemolen (Republic of Ireland) Damien Faulkner	Results
2	Long Beach	(United States) **#6 Muscle Milk Aston Martin Racing**	(United States) #33 Level 5 Motorsports	(United States) #06 Core Autosport	(United States) #56 BMW Team RLL	(United States) #54 Black Swan Racing	Results
2	Long Beach	(Germany) **Klaus Graf** (Germany) **Lucas Luhr**	(United States) Scott Tucker (France) Christophe Bouchut	(United States) Gunnar Jeannette (Mexico) Ricardo González	(Germany) Dirk Müller (United States) Joey Hand	(United States) Tim Pappas (Netherlands) Jeroen Bleekemolen	Results
3	Lime Rock	(United States) **#16 Dyson Racing Team**	did not participate	(United States) #63 Genoa Racing	(United States) #56 BMW Team RLL	(United States) #68 TRG	Results
3	Lime Rock	(United States) **Chris Dyson** (United Kingdom) **Guy Smith**	did not participate	(United States) Eric Lux (United States) Elton Julian	(Germany) Dirk Müller (United States) Joey Hand	(United States) Dion von Moltke (United States) Mike Piera	Results
4	Mosport	(United States) **#6 Muscle Milk Aston Martin Racing**	did not participate	(United States) #06 Core Autosport	(United States) #4 Corvette Racing	(United States) #66 TRG	Results
4	Mosport	(Germany) **Klaus Graf** (Germany) **Lucas Luhr**	did not participate	(United States) Gunnar Jeannette (Mexico) Ricardo González	(Denmark) Jan Magnussen (United Kingdom) Oliver Gavin	(United States) Duncan Ende (United States) Spencer Pumpelly	Results
5	Mid-Ohio	(United States) **#6 Muscle Milk Aston Martin Racing**	did not participate	(United States) #89 Intersport Racing	(United States) #17 Team Falken Tire	(United States) #66 TRG	Results
5	Mid-Ohio	(Germany) **Klaus Graf** (Germany) **Lucas Luhr**	did not participate	(Canada) Kyle Marcelli (United States) Tomy Drissi	(Germany) Wolf Henzler (United States) Bryan Sellers	(United States) Duncan Ende (United States) Spencer Pumpelly	Results
6	Road America	(United States) **#6 Muscle Milk Aston Martin Racing**	(United States) #055 Level 5 Motorsports	(United States) #52 PR1 Mathiasen Motorsports	(United States) #62 Risi Competizione	(United States) #54 Black Swan Motorsports	Results
6	Road America	(Germany) **Klaus Graf** (Germany) **Lucas Luhr**	(United States) Scott Tucker (France) Christophe Bouchut (Mexico) Luis Díaz	(United States) Butch Leitzinger (Mexico) Rudy Junco Jr.	(Brazil) Jaime Melo (Finland) Toni Vilander	(United States) Tim Pappas (Netherlands) Jeroen Bleekemolen	Results
7	Baltimore	(United States) **#20 Oryx Dyson Racing**	did not participate	(United States) #37 Intersport Racing	(United States) #17 Team Falken Tire	(United States) #54 Black Swan Racing	Results
7	Baltimore	(United Arab Emirates) **Humaid Al Masaood** (United Kingdom) **Steven Kane**	did not participate	(Canada) Kyle Marcelli (United States) Tomy Drissi	(Germany) Wolf Henzler (United States) Bryan Sellers	(United States) Tim Pappas (Netherlands) Jeroen Bleekemolen	Results
8	Laguna Seca	(United Kingdom) **#007 Aston Martin Racing**	(United States) #055 Level 5 Motorsports	(United States) #63 Genoa Racing	(United States) #45 Flying Lizard Motorsports	(United States) #66 TRG	Results
8	Laguna Seca	(Mexico) **Adrián Fernández** (Germany) **Stefan Mücke** (Switzerland) **Harold Primat**	(United States) Scott Tucker (France) Christophe Bouchut (Mexico) Luis Díaz	(United States) Eric Lux (United States) Elton Julian (United States) Michael Guasch	(Germany) Jörg Bergmeister (United States) Patrick Long	(United States) Duncan Ende (United States) Peter Ludwig (United States) Spencer Pumpelly	Results
9	Road Atlanta	(France) **#8 Peugeot Sport Total**	(United States) #33 Level 5 Motorsports	(United States) #52 PR1 Mathiasen Motorsports	(Italy) #51 AF Corse	(United States) #54 Black Swan Racing	Results
9	Road Atlanta	(France) **Franck Montagny** (France) **Stéphane Sarrazin** (Austria) **Alexander Wurz**	(United States) Scott Tucker (France) Christophe Bouchut (Portugal) João Barbosa	(United States) Ken Dobson (France) Henri Richard (United Kingdom) Ryan Lewis	(Italy) Giancarlo Fisichella (Italy) Gianmaria Bruni (Germany) Pierre Kaffer	(United States) Tim Pappas (Netherlands) Jeroen Bleekemolen (Netherlands) Sebastiaan Bleekemolen	Results

== Championships ==
Points were awarded to the top ten cars and drivers which complete at least 70% of their class winner's distance. Teams with multiple entries only score the points of their highest finishing entry in each race. Drivers were required to drive a minimum of 45 minutes to earn points, except for the Long Beach event which required only 30 minutes. Drivers are required to complete a particular amount of the minimum number of laps in order to earn points. The number of laps vary depending on the course size.

Points System
Race Distance	Position									
Race Distance	1st	2nd	3rd	4th	5th	6th	7th	8th	9th	10th
Less than four hours	20	16	13	10	8	6	4	3	2	1
Between four and eight hours	25	21	18	15	13	11	9	8	7	6
More than eight hours	30	26	23	20	18	16	14	13	12	11

=== Team championships ===
Teams with full season entries are awarded points in the team championships. Teams which participated in a partial season or on a race-by-race basis are not included in these championships.

As long as they compete full season and comply with ACO regulations, the top LMP1, LMP2 and GT team at the end of the season receive an automatic entry to the 2012 24 Hours of Le Mans.

==== LMP1 standings ====
Pos	Team	Chassis	Engine	SEB	LBH	LRP	MOS	MOH	ROA	BAL	LGA	ATL	Total
1	(United States) Dyson Racing Team	Lola B09/86	Mazda MZR-R 2.0 L Turbo I4	30	16	20	16	16	21	16	21	30	186
2	(United States) Muscle Milk Aston Martin Racing	Lola-Aston Martin B08/62	Aston Martin AM04 6.0 L V12	0	20	16	20	20	25	10	13	0	124
3	(United States) Autocon	Lola B06/10	AER P32C 4.0 L Turbo V8				0	13	18	13	15	26	85
4	(United States) Oryx Dyson Racing	Lola B09/86	Mazda MZR-R 2.0 L Turbo I4			13	13	0	0	20	18	0	64

==== LMP2 standings ====
Pos	Team	Chassis	Engine	SEB	LBH	LRP	MOS	MOH	ROA	BAL	LGA	ATL	Total
1	(United States) Level 5 Motorsports	Lola B08/80 & Lola B11/40	HPD HR28TT 2.8 L Turbo V6	30	20				25				130
1	(United States) Level 5 Motorsports	HPD ARX-01g	HPD HR28TT 2.8 L Turbo V6								25	30	130

==== LMPC standings ====
All teams utilize the Oreca FLM09 chassis with Chevrolet LS3 engine.

Pos	Team	SEB	LBH	LRP	MOS	MOH	ROA	BAL	LGA	ATL	Total
1	(United States) CORE Autosport	26	20	16	20	10	18	13	21	23	167
2	(United States) Genoa Racing	30	13	20	13	8	21	16	25	20	166
3	(United States) Intersport Racing	0	16	13	10	20	15	20	18	26	138
4	(United States) Performance Tech Motorsports	18	0	10	8	4	11	8	11	16	86
5	(United States) PR1 Mathiasen Motorsports	0	8			13	25	0	9	30	85

==== GT standings ====
Pos	Team	Chassis	Engine	SEB	LBH	LRP	MOS	MOH	ROA	BAL	LGA	ATL	Total
1	(United States) BMW Team RLL	BMW M3 GT2	BMW S65B40 4.0 L V8	30	20	20	13	13	21	16	21	26	180
2	(United States) Corvette Racing	Chevrolet Corvette C6.R	Chevrolet LS5.5R 5.5 L V8	23	16	2	20	16	13	13	13	23	139
3	(United States) Flying Lizard Motorsports	Porsche 997 GT3-RSR	Porsche M97/74 4.0 L Flat-6	18	3	16	3	2	15	3	25	30	115
4	(United States) Team Falken Tire	Porsche 997 GT3-RSR	Porsche M97/74 4.0 L Flat-6	0	10	8	8	20	11	20	0	20	97
5	(United States) Risi Competizione	Ferrari 458 Italia GT2	Ferrari F136 4.5 L V8	12	13	0	16	0	25	6	11	0	83
6	(United States) Extreme Speed Motorsports	Ferrari 458 Italia GT2	Ferrari F136 4.5 L V8	13	2	10	2	8	8	2	18	18	81
7	(United States) Robertson Racing	Ford GT-R Mk. VII	Ford Cammer 5.0 L V8	14	0	13	4	4	6			11	52
8	(United States) Paul Miller Racing	Porsche 997 GT3-RSR	Porsche M97/74 4.0 L Flat-6	0	0	6	1	3	9	10	6	12	47
9	(United States) JaguarRSR	Jaguar XKR GT2	Jaguar AJ133S 5.0 L V8	0	6	0	0	0	0	0	0	0	6
10	(United States) West Yokohama Racing	Lamborghini Gallardo LP560 GT2	Lamborghini 5.2 L V10	0	1								1

==== GTC standings ====
All teams utilize variations of the Porsche 997 GT3 Cup.

Pos	Team	SEB	LBH	LRP	MOS	MOH	ROA	BAL	LGA	ATL	Total
1	(United States) Black Swan Racing	30	20	10	13	16	25	20	21	30	185
2	(United States) TRG	26	8	20	20	20	21	8	25	23	171
3	(United States) Alex Job Racing	13	16	13	10	8	0	16	15	26	117
4	(United States) Green Hornet / Black Swan Racing	16		0		6	13	10	18		63
5	(United States) JDX Racing	20	10	6	8	10	0		8		62
6	(United States) Magnus Racing	14	13			13		13			53
7	(United States) GMG Racing	0	0	8			15		13		36

=== Driver championships ===
Drivers who participated in races but failed to score points over the course of the season are not listed.

==== LMP1 standings ====
Pos	Driver	Team	SEB	LBH	LRP	MOS	MOH	ROA	BAL	LGA	ATL	Total
1=	(United States) Chris Dyson	(United States) Dyson Racing Team	30	16	20	16	16	21	16	21	30	186
1=	(United Kingdom) Guy Smith	(United States) Dyson Racing Team	30	16	20	16	16	21	16	21	30	186
2	(Germany) Klaus Graf	(United States) Muscle Milk Aston Martin Racing	0	20	16	20	20	25	10	13	0	124
3	(Germany) Lucas Luhr	(United States) Muscle Milk Aston Martin Racing	0	20	16	20	20	25		13	0	114
4=	(Canada) Tony Burgess	(United States) Autocon					13	18	13	15	26	85
4=	(United States) Chris McMurry	(United States) Autocon					13	18	13	15	26	85
5=	(United Arab Emirates) Humaid Al Masaood	(United States) Oryx Dyson Racing			13	13	0		20	18	0	64
5=	(United Kingdom) Steven Kane	(United States) Oryx Dyson Racing			13	13	0		20	18	0	64
6	(United States) Jay Cochran	(United States) Dyson Racing Team	30								30	60
7=	(Mexico) Adrián Fernández	(United Kingdom) Aston Martin Racing								25		25
7=	(Germany) Stefan Mücke	(United Kingdom) Aston Martin Racing								25		25
7=	(Switzerland) Harold Primat	(United Kingdom) Aston Martin Racing								25		25

==== LMP2 standings ====
Pos	Driver	Team	SEB	LBH	LRP	MOS	MOH	ROA	BAL	LGA	ATL	Total
1=	(France) Christophe Bouchut	(United States) Level 5 Motorsports	26	20				25		25	30	126
1=	(United States) Scott Tucker	(United States) Level 5 Motorsports	26	20				25		25	30	126
2	(Mexico) Luis Díaz	(United States) Level 5 Motorsports	30	0				25			23	78
3	(Portugal) João Barbosa	(United States) Level 5 Motorsports	26								30	56
4	(United States) Ryan Hunter-Reay	(United States) Level 5 Motorsports	30									30
5=	(United States) Zak Brown	(United States) United Autosports									26	26
5=	(Sweden) Stefan Johansson	(United States) United Autosports									26	26
5=	(South Africa) Mark Patterson	(United States) United Autosports									26	26
6	(United Kingdom) Marino Franchitti	(United States) Level 5 Motorsports									23	23

==== LMPC standings ====
Drivers in the LMPC category are allowed to drive for more than one car during an event. If a driver is in each car for a minimum of two hours each, he is allowed to score the points from whichever car he chooses.

Pos	Driver	Team	SEB	LBH	LRP	MOS	MOH	ROA	BAL	LGA	ATL	Total
1=	(Mexico) Ricardo González	(United States) Core Autosport	23	20	16	20	10	13	10	21	23	156
1=	(United States) Gunnar Jeannette	(United States) Core Autosport	23	20	16	20	10	13	10	21	23	156
1=	(United States) Eric Lux	(United States) Genoa Racing	20	13	20	13	8	21	16	25	20	156
2=	(United States) Jon Bennett	(United States) Core Autosport	26	10	8	16	6	18	13	15	18	130
2=	(United States) Frankie Montecalvo	(United States) Core Autosport	26	10	8	16	6	18	13	15	18	130
3	(Canada) Kyle Marcelli	(United States) Intersport Racing	0	16	13	0	20	11	20	18	26	124
4	(United States) Elton Julian	(United States) Genoa Racing	20	13	20			21	16	25	0	115
5	(United States) Tomy Drissi	(United States) Intersport Racing	0	16	13		20		20	13	26	108
6	(Mexico) Rudy Junco Jr.	(United States) Core Autosport	23					25		21	23	92
7	(United States) Anthony Nicolosi	(United States) Performance Tech Motorsports	18	0	10	8	4	11	8	11	16	86
8	(United States) Jarrett Boon	(United States) Performance Tech Motorsports		0	10	8	4	11	8	11	16	68
9	(Germany) Jan-Dirk Lueders	(United States) Performance Tech Motorsports	18							11	16	45
10	(United Kingdom) Ryan Dalziel	(United States) Core Autosport	26								18	44
11=	(Germany) Christian Zugel	(United States) Genoa Racing	20			13	8	0			0	41
11=	(United States) Jon Field	(United States) Intersport Racing			6	10	16	9				41
12=	(United States) Ken Dobson	(United States) PR1 Mathiasen Motorsports								9	30	39
12=	(United States) Henri Richard	(United States) PR1 Mathiasen Motorsports								9	30	39
13	(United States) Clint Field	(United States) Intersport Racing					16	15				31
14=	(United States) Dane Cameron	(United States) Genoa Racing	30									30
14=	(Germany) Jens Peterson	(United States) Genoa Racing	30									30
14=	(United Kingdom) Ryan Lewis	(United States) PR1 Mathiasen Motorsports									30	30
15	(United States) Butch Leitzinger	(United States) PR1 Mathiasen Motorsports						25				25
16	(United States) Chapman Ducote	(United States) Intersport Racing						15	6	0		21
17=	(United States) David Ducote	(United States) Intersport Racing						15		0		15
17=	(United Kingdom) Andy Wallace	(United States) Core Autosport								15		15
18=	(United States) David Cheng	(United States) PR1 Mathiasen Motorsports					13					13
18=	(Mexico) Javier Echeverría	(United States) PR1 Mathiasen Motorsports					13					13
18=	(Puerto Rico) Ricardo Vera	(United States) Intersport Racing								13		13
19=	(United States) James French	(United States) Intersport Racing						9				9
19=	(United States) Michael Marsal	(United States) Intersport Racing						9				9
19=	(United States) Rene Villeneuve	(United States) PR1 Mathiasen Motorsports								9		9
20=	(United States) Alex Figge	(United States) PR1 Mathiasen Motorsports		8								8
20=	(United States) Miles Maroney	(United States) PR1 Mathiasen Motorsports		8								8
21	(Australia) James Kovacic	(United States) Intersport Racing			6							6

==== GT standings ====
Pos	Driver	Team	SEB	LBH	LRP	MOS	MOH	ROA	BAL	LGA	ATL	Total
1=	(United States) Joey Hand	(United States) BMW Team RLL	30	20	20	10	10	18	16	21	14	159
1=	(Germany) Dirk Müller	(United States) BMW Team RLL	30	20	20	10	10	18	16	21	14	159
2=	(United Kingdom) Oliver Gavin	(United States) Corvette Racing	20	16	1	20	16	13	13	13	23	135
2=	(Denmark) Jan Magnussen	(United States) Corvette Racing	20	16	1	20	16	13	13	13	23	135
3=	(United States) Bill Auberlen	(United States) BMW Team RLL	26	4	3	13	13	21	8	15	26	129
3=	(Germany) Dirk Werner	(United States) BMW Team RLL	26	4	3	13	13	21	8	15	26	129
4=	(Germany) Jörg Bergmeister	(United States) Flying Lizard Motorsports	18	0	16	0	2	15	0	25	30	106
4=	(United States) Patrick Long	(United States) Flying Lizard Motorsports	18	0	16	0	2	15	0	25	30	106
5=	(Germany) Wolf Henzler	(United States) Team Falken Tire	0	10	8	8	20	11	20	0	20	97
5=	(United States) Bryan Sellers	(United States) Team Falken Tire	0	10	8	8	20	11	20	0	20	97
6=	(Brazil) Jaime Melo	(United States) Risi Competizione	12	13	0	16	0	25	6	11	0	83
6=	(Finland) Toni Vilander	(United States) Risi Competizione	12	13	0	16	0	25	6	11	0	83
7=	(United States) Scott Sharp	(United States) Extreme Speed Motorsports	0	0	10	2	8	8	2	18	18	66
7=	(United States) Johannes van Overbeek	(United States) Extreme Speed Motorsports	0	0	10	2	8	8	2	18	18	66
8	(United States) Seth Neiman	(United States) Flying Lizard Motorsports	16	3	4	3	1	7	3	7	16	60
9=	(Monaco) Olivier Beretta	(United States) Corvette Racing	23	8	2	6	6	0	4	9	0	58
9=	(United States) Tommy Milner	(United States) Corvette Racing	23	8	2	6	6	0	4	9	0	58
10	(Germany) Marco Holzer	(United States) Flying Lizard Motorsports	16		4	3		7		7	16	53
11	(Brazil) Augusto Farfus	(United States) BMW Team RLL	26								26	52
12	(United States) David Murry	(United States) Robertson Racing	11	0	13	4	4	6			11	49
13=	(Germany) Sascha Maassen	(United States) Paul Miller Racing	0	0	6	1	3	9	10	6	12	47
13=	(United States) Bryce Miller	(United States) Paul Miller Racing	0	0	6	1	3	9	10	6	12	47
14	(United States) Darren Law	(United States) Flying Lizard Motorsports	16	3			1		3		16	39
15	(United States) Anthony Lazzaro	(United States) Robertson Racing	11	0	13	4	4	6				38
16	(United States) Guy Cosmo	(United States) Extreme Speed Motorsports	13	2	0	0	0	0	1	8	13	37
17=	(United Kingdom) Andy Priaulx	(United States) BMW Team RLL	30									30
17=	(France) Patrick Pilet	(United States) Flying Lizard Motorsports									30	30
18	(United Kingdom) Rob Bell	(United States) Extreme Speed Motorsports	13								13	26
19	(United States) Andrea Robertson	(United States) Robertson Racing	14	0	0	0	0	0			11	25
20	(United States) Ed Brown	(United States) Extreme Speed Motorsports	0	2	0	0	0	0	1	8	13	24
21	(Austria) Martin Ragginger	(United States) Team Falken Tire									20	20
22	(Germany) Dominik Farnbacher	(United States) Extreme Speed Motorsports									18	18
23=	(United States) David Robertson	(United States) Robertson Racing	14	0	0	0						14
23=	(United States) Boris Said	(United States) Robertson Racing	14									14
24=	(Finland) Mika Salo	(United States) Risi Competizione	12									12
24=	(France) Emmanuel Collard	(United States) Paul Miller Racing									12	12
25=	(United States) Colin Braun	(United States) Robertson Racing	11									11
25=	(United States) Melanie Snow	(United States) Robertson Racing									11	11
26=	(Brazil) Cristiano da Matta	(United States) JaguarRSR	0	6	0	0	0					6
26=	(Brazil) Bruno Junqueira	(United States) JaguarRSR	0	6	0	0	0	0	0	0	0	6
27=	(Netherlands) Nicky Pastorelli	(United States) West Yokohama Racing	0	1								1
27=	(Germany) Dominik Schwager	(United States) West Yokohama Racing	0	1								1

==== GTC standings ====
Pos	Driver	Team	SEB	LBH	LRP	MOS	MOH	ROA	BAL	LGA	ATL	Total
1	(United States) Tim Pappas	(United States) Black Swan Racing	30	20	10	13	16	25	20	21	30	185
2=	(United States) Duncan Ende	(United States) TRG	26		16	20	20	21	6	25	23	157
2=	(United States) Spencer Pumpelly	(United States) TRG	26		16	20	20	21	6	25	23	157
3	(Netherlands) Jeroen Bleekemolen	(United States) Black Swan Racing		20			16	25	20	21	30	132
4	(United States) Bill Sweedler	(United States) Alex Job Racing	13	16	13	10	8	0	16	15	26	117
5	(United States) Dion von Moltke	(United States) TRG	18		20	16	4	11	8	11	20	108
6	(United States) Leh Keen	(United States) Alex Job Racing	13	16			8		16		26	79
7	(Republic of Ireland) Damien Faulkner	(United States) Black Swan Racing	30		10	13				18		71
8	(United States) Brian Wong	(United States) Alex Job Racing	13			10				15	26	64
9	(United States) Peter LeSaffre	(United States) Kelly-Moss Motorsports	16		0		6	13	10	18		63
10	(United Kingdom) Nick Ham	(United States) JDX Racing	20	10	6	8	10	0		8		62
11	(Netherlands) Sebastiaan Bleekemolen	(United States) Black Swan Racing	30							0	30	60
12=	(United States) John Potter	(United States) Magnus Racing	14	13			13		13			53
12=	(United States) Craig Stanton	(United States) Magnus Racing	14	13			13		13			53
13=	(United Kingdom) Sean Edwards	(United States) NGT Motorsport	23					18				41
13=	(United States) Peter Ludwig	(United States) TRG	18								23	41
14	(Canada) Chris Cumming	(United States) JDX Racing	20			8	10					38
15=	(United States) James Sofronas	(United States) GMG Racing	0	0	8			15		13		36
15=	(United States) Alex Welch	(United States) GMG Racing			8			15		13		36
16	(United States) Andrew Davis	(United States) Kelly-Moss Motorsports	16				6		10			32
17	(United States) Marc Bunting	(United States) TRG				16	4		8			28
18=	(United States) Henrique Cisneros	(United States) NGT Motorsport						18		9		27
18=	(United States) Carlos Kauffman	(United States) NGT Motorsport						18		9		27
19	(Hong Kong) Alain Li	(United States) TRG	26									26
20	(Venezuela) Emilio Di Guida	(United States) TRG						11		11		22
21=	(United States) Mike Piera	(United States) TRG			20							20
21=	(United States) Ben Keating	(United States) TRG									20	20
22	(United States) Scott Blackett	(United States) JDX Racing		10						8		18
23	(United States) Bob Faieta	(United States) Kelly-Moss Motorsports	16									16
24	(United States) Shane Lewis	(United States) Alex Job Racing								15		15
25=	(United States) Chris Thompson	(United States) JDX Racing			6					8		14
25=	(Hong Kong) Matthew Marsh	(United States) Magnus Racing	14									14
26=	(United States) Butch Leitzinger	(United States) Alex Job Racing			13							13
26=	(Netherlands) Jaap van Lagen	(United States) Green Hornet/Black Swan Racing						13				13
27=	(Germany) Dominik Farnbacher	(United States) Porsche Napleton Racing						9				9
27=	(Denmark) David Heinemeier Hansson	(United States) Porsche Napleton Racing						9				9
28	(United States) Brendan Gaughan	(United States) TRG		8								8

== Team changes ==
- Reigning LMPC champions Level 5 Motorsports have announced that they will move to the LMP2 class for 2011. They will run a Lola B11/40 and a Lola B08/80 coupé with Honda engines. Team owner Scott Tucker, Christophe Bouchut, and Luis Díaz have been confirmed as drivers.
