= Robert Graham (fashion brand) =

American luxury men's fashion brand

Robert Graham Designs
- Type: Public
- Industry: Fashion
- Founded: New York City, New York, United States (2001)
- Founder: Graham Fowler; Robert Stock
- Headquarters: New York City, New York, USA
- Area served: North America; Europe
- Key people: Andrew Berg (CEO)
- Products: Clothing and Accessories
- Brands: Robert Graham; Limited Edition; Modern Americana
- Owner: Centric Brands
- Website: www.robertgraham.us

Robert Graham is a New York-based luxury men's fashion brand launched in 2001, taking its name from its co-founders, fashion designer Robert Stock and textile designer Graham Fowler. It is known for its use of complicated and colorful fabric patterns, including contrasting patterns inside the cuffs of its shirt sleeves.

In May 2020, Centric Brands, parent company of Robert Graham, filed for Chapter 11 bankruptcy protection due to the effects of the COVID-19 pandemic.

== History ==
Robert Stock is a native of the Bronx whose interest in fashion was influenced by his father, a mechanic and gas station owner who liked to wear bright, colorful, patterned shirts. He began his career working for small New York-based menswear designer Paul Ressler, but in 1970 created his own line called Country Britches. While still working at a local men's store in the Bronx, he met fellow New York designer Ralph Lauren when Lauren entered the store as a tie salesman. The two became friends and Stock sold his own company to collaborate with Lauren on his Chaps collection. The two parted ways in 1975 for Stock to launch his own Country Roads line, for which he won a Coty Award for Best American Sportswear Designer and a Cutty Sark Award for Leading American Men's Wear Designer. He then developed his Robert Stock Designs brand, growing internationally, until forming Robert Graham.

The idea that would become Robert Graham came after meeting Graham Fowler, a French textile designer. The two launched the label in 2001. Fowler left the following year to pursue other projects while Stock remained to serve as co-chairman and Chief Creative Officer.

As of 2019, Robert Graham has 21 retail stores and 12 outlet stores, and is sold by independent boutiques as well as large department store chains like Nordstrom, Neiman Marcus, Saks Fifth Avenue, and Bloomingdale's. It has a flagship store on Abbot Kinney Boulevard in Los Angeles, California.

== Design ==
Stock and Fowler intended to fill a menswear niche "that craved pops of color and interesting, conversation-provoking pieces," a style Stock would later call "American Eclectic." By offering sizes up to 4XL, the brand has been able to expand upon that niche to customers not typically served by luxury fashion labels.

In addition to bright colors and patterns, Robert Graham shirts use contrasting patterns and embroidery on inward-facing surfaces such as inside shirt cuffs, under collars, and along the button line. Printed or embroidered on every garment is the company motto "Knowledge Wisdom Truth." The unusual, frequently hidden details have become as closely identified with the brand as the outward patterns. Though it began with and continues to focus on menswear, and men's shirts in particular, the brand has branched out to pants, shorts, sport coats, outerwear, neckwear, accessories, hats, shoes, and denim. In 2005 the company began production of womenswear as well, using the same kinds of color, contrast, and detail-heavy aesthetics.

In addition to its main line, the company has offered a number of sub-labels with slightly different aesthetics: the more elaborate, higher-end Limited Edition and Zen lines; the more subtle, slim-cut X Collection; a more casual line named after the very first Robert Graham collection, Freshly Laundered Shirt Co.;; and more traditional patterns in the RG line.

All of the fabrics used in Robert Graham shirts are designed in-house and, according to Stock, the embroidery is done such that no two shirts are identical. After discovering "collectors" among customers, the company began its Collector's Club promotion, rewarding those with more than 100 shirts by naming a shirt after them. As of 2014, Robert Graham produces four menswear collections and one women's wear collection per year.

In 2012 Stock designed a collection of Robert Graham sunglasses and prescription eyeglass frames for Revolution Eyewear and in 2014 the company licensed its name to Batallure Beauty to develop a line of fragrances and personal care products.

== Popular culture ==
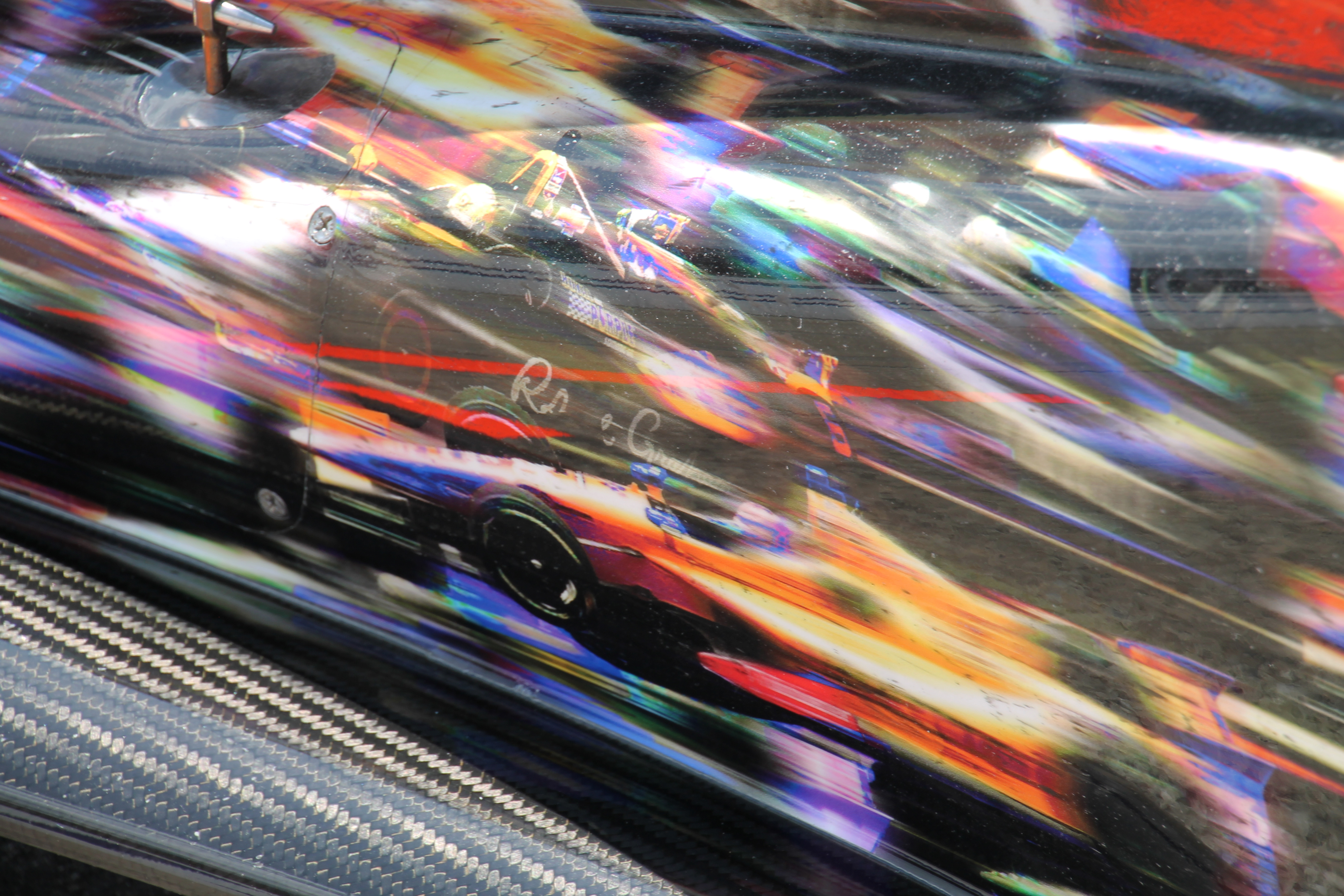
Detail of Townsend Bell's #24 Robert Graham sponsored car at the Indianapolis 500

American Idol judge Randy Jackson has been cited as wearing Robert Graham shirts on the show and the contrasting shirt cuffs have become identified with the character Cameron Tucker from the television show Modern Family.

Race car driver Townsend Bell was noted for wearing a Robert Graham polka dotted fedora at the 2013 Indianapolis 500. For the 2014 race, Bell brought the company on as a primary sponsor of his KV Racing Technology Number 6 car. Both the exterior and, unusually, the interior of the car display characteristic colors, patterns, and logos. Bell's racing crew uniforms and firesuit were likewise custom designs. Robert Graham also sponsored Bell's subsequent Number 24 and Number 29 cars, which raced in the 2015 and 2016 Indianapolis 500s, respectively. According to Stock, the company has an interest in motorsports predating sponsorship of Bell, due to a noted overlap in customers and a suggestion by Bill Sweedler, a race car driver and financial manager whose firm, Tengram Capital Partners, owns a majority interest in the company.
