= Townsend Bell =

American racing driver (born 1975)

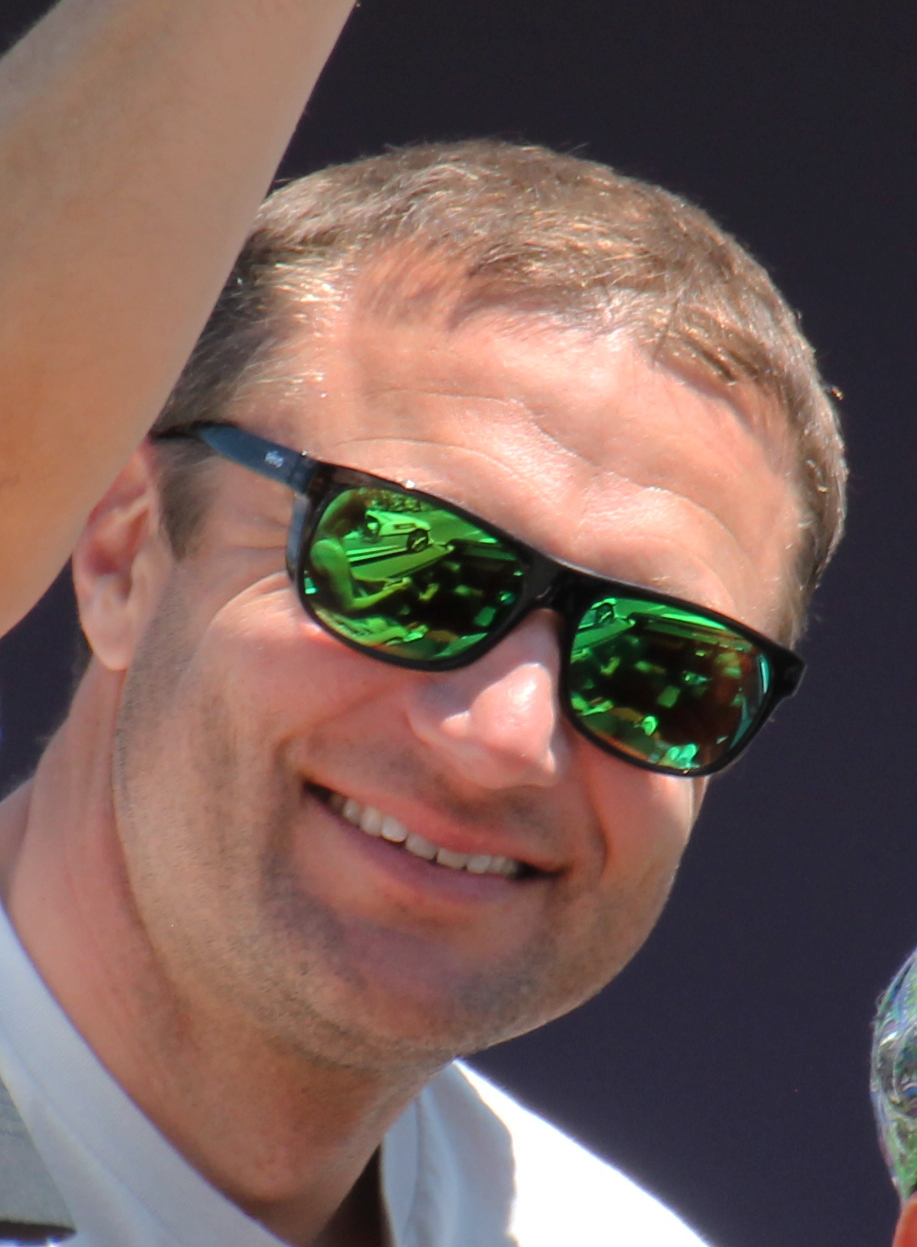
- Bell at the 2015 Indianapolis 500
- Nationality: (United States) American
- Born: Townsend Lorenz Bell; April 19, 1975 (age 51) San Francisco, California, U.S.

Verizon IndyCar Series career
- Debut season: 2004
- Categorisation: FIA Gold (until 2026); FIA Silver (2027–)
- Starts: 28
- Wins: 0
- Poles: 0
- Best finish: 21st in 2004

Previous series
- 2003 2001–2002 2000–2001 1999: Formula 3000; CART World Series; Indy Lights; Barber Dodge Pro Series

Championship titles
- 2001 2015: Indy Lights; United SportsCar Championship GTD

Townsend Lorenz Bell (born April 19, 1975) is an American professional motor racing driver competing in the IMSA WeatherTech SportsCar Championship, and also as a motorsports commentator for FOX Sports’ IndyCar Series coverage.

== Early career ==
Bell spent time in karting, Skip Barber, Formula Dodge and the Barber Dodge Pro Series before graduating to Indy Lights in 2000. He won the Indy Lights championship in 2001. This earned him two late-season starts in a Champ Car in a joint effort between Patrick Racing and Dale Coyne Racing. He earned Roberto Moreno's seat at Patrick for 2002. He scored a best finish of fourth at Portland, however a run of disappointing performances and a two probation sanctions from CART Chief Steward Wally Dallenbach Sr. led to his firing from the team after the nine races.

== International Formula 3000 career ==
Bell's efforts shifted to Europe and in 2003 he was teammate to series champion Björn Wirdheim in International F3000 competition. He was the first American to score a F3000 podium with a third place at the Hungaroring and he finished ninth overall in a field covered with future Formula One talent – Giorgio Pantano, Patrick Friesacher, Vitantonio Liuzzi and Nicolas Kiesa among them.

Bell's performance in F3000 led to Formula One tests with the Jaguar and BAR Honda F1 teams.

== Return to IndyCar ==
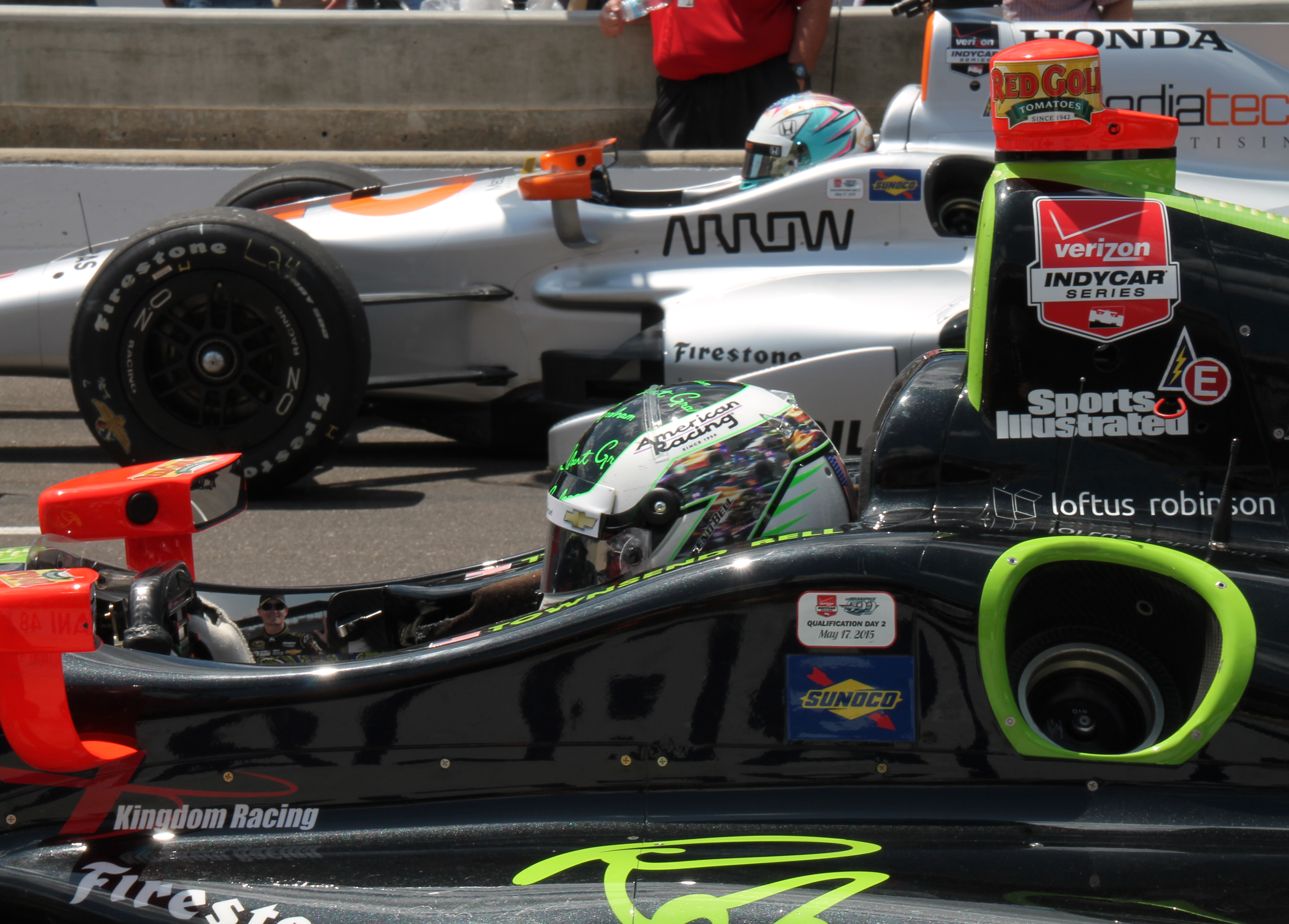
Bell (foreground) participating in the Pit Stop Challenge on Carb Day at the 2015 Indianapolis 500

Despite earning a test with British American Racing at year's end, Bell returned to America where he replaced Mark Taylor for Panther Racing in the Indy Racing League IndyCar Series midway through 2004, and posted a best finish of fifth. He started one race as an injury replacement for Tomáš Enge in the same car in 2005. He made his first Indianapolis 500 appearance for Vision Racing in 2006, qualifying fifteenth and finishing 22nd. He returned to the IndyCar Series in 2008 driving the No. 23 car in events where Milka Duno was not scheduled to race. His best result in 2008 was an eighth place finish at Richmond International Raceway in June. He also was entered in a third team car in the Indy 500, where he qualified twelfth and finished tenth.

In 2009, KV Racing Technology entered Bell in the Indy 500, engineered by Gerald Tyler. Bell was on a limited-month schedule but had an impressive race day, advancing from 24th on the grid up to the top-five. Passing Team Penske's Will Power on the last restart, Bell impressed with a fourth-place finish.

Bell posted his best Indianapolis 500 qualifying effort to date in 2011, racing for Sam Schmidt Motorsports, once again engineered by Tyler. By qualifying fourth fastest, he started the 95th running of the Greatest Spectacle in Racing on the inside of the second row.

Bell finished ninth in the 2012 Indianapolis 500 with Sam Schmidt Motorsports, engineered by Tyler. His 2014 Indianapolis 500, back with KV Racing Technology in the No. 6 Robert Graham Dallara-Chevrolet, marked his eighth start in the event and seventh consecutive.

Bell qualified fourth and led twelve laps in the 2016 Indy 500, racing for Andretti Autosport, before an incident on pit road during caution. He finished 21st. It was also during this week that he clocked a top speed of 241.637 mph.

== Sports car career ==
Bell made his sports car debut in 2012 and won the 12 Hours of Sebring on debut with Alex Job Racing. That season, he drove a Lotus Evora GTE for Alex Job Racing in the American Le Mans Series with Bill Sweedler, before he and Sweedler drove a Ferrari F458 Italia the following year with West/AJR.

Bell matched his Sebring feat in his first Rolex 24 at Daytona start in 2014, winning that driving with Level 5 Motorsports. Bell and Sweedler won the Tequila Patron North American Endurance Cup with AIM Autosport, after finishing first or second in three of the four races in the endurance series within the TUDOR United SportsCar Championship. The pairing finished fourth overall in the full season GT Daytona class points.

In 2015, Bell and co-driver Bill Sweedler took home the IMSA GT Daytona Championship. In addition, they had a dominant win at VIR and podium finishes in the 12 Hours of Sebring and 24 Hours of Le Mans.

In 2016, Bell along with teammates Jeff Segal and Bill Sweedler won the 24 Hours of LeMans in only their second try.

Bell is competed full-time in the 2017 WeatherTech SportsCar Championship GT Daytona class with Alex Job Racing in an Audi R8 GT3 and returned to Le Mans with Ferrari in 2017.

Most recently, Bell has competed in the AIM Vasser-Sullivan Lexus RC F GT3 for the 2019 & 2020 GTD class seasons.

== Television ==
Since 2025, Bell is a color commentator for IndyCar on FOX Sports with lead anchor Will Buxton and fellow analyst James Hinchcliffe.

Bell has filled in for Formula One coverage on NBC, most notably in 2016 when he replaced Will Buxton, who was on bereavement leave for the races at Sepang and Mexico City.

Bell is also a color commentator for NBC Sports's Global RallyCross Championship. He has also both competed and commented in the Stadium Super Trucks.

At the 2013 X-Games in Munich, Bell competed in Global Rallycross and finished sixth in the final.

== Racing record ==
=== American open–wheel racing results ===
(key) (Races in bold indicate pole position; races in italics indicate fastest lap.)

==== Barber Dodge Pro Series ====
Year	1	2	3	4	5	6	7	8	9	10	11	12	Rank	Points
1998	SEB; 28	LRP; 13	DET; 28	WGI; 22	CLE; 16	GRA	MOH	ROA	LS1; 5	ATL; 3	HMS; 23	LS2; 8	**16th**	**36**
1999	SEB; 30	NAZ; 3	LRP; 1	**POR**; 4	CLE; 8	ROA; 5	DET; 16	MOH; 21	GRA; 8	LS; 3	HMS; 19	WGI; 2	**3rd**	**104**

==== Indy Lights ====
Year	Team	1	2	3	4	5	6	7	8	9	10	11	12	Rank	Points	Ref
2000	Dorricott Racing	LBH; 17	MIL; 6	DET; 7	**POR**; 2	MIS; 4	CHI; 2	MOH; 1	VAN; 4	LS; 18	**STL**; 1	HOU; 2	FON; 2	**2nd**	**146**	
2001	Dorricott Racing	MTY; 2	LBH; 1	TXS; 8	**MIL**; 1	**POR**; 6	KAN; 5	**TOR**; 1	**MOH**; 1	**STL**; 9	**ATL**; 2	**LS**; 1	**FON**; 1	**1st**	**192**	

==== CART ====
Year	Team	No.	1	2	3	4	5	6	7	8	9	10	11	12	13	14	15	16	17	18	19	20	21	Rank	Points	Ref
2001	Patrick Racing	20	MTY	LBH	TXS	NZR	MOT	MIL	DET	POR	CLE	TOR	MIS	CHI	MOH	ROA	VAN	LAU; 13	ROC; 12	HOU	LS	SRF	FON	**30th**	**1**	
2002	Patrick Racing	20	MTY; 19	LBH; 15	MOT; 14	MIL; 13	LS; 7	POR; 4	CHI; 12	TOR; 15	CLE; 18	VAN	MOH	ROA	MTL	DEN	ROC	MIA	SRF	FON	MXC			**20th**	**19**	

==== IndyCar Series ====
Year	Team	No.	Chassis	Engine	1	2	3	4	5	6	7	8	9	10	11	12	13	14	15	16	17	18	19	Rank	Points	Ref
2004	Panther Racing	2	Dallara	Chevrolet	HMS	PHX	MOT	INDY	TXS	RIR	KAN; 17	NSH; 5	MIL; 6	MIS; 8	KTY; 21	PPIR; 12	NZR; 18	CHI; 22	FON; 9	TX2; 9				21st	193	
2005	Panther Racing	2	Dallara	Chevrolet	HMS	PHX	STP	MOT	INDY	TXS	RIR	KAN	NSH	MIL	MIS; 15	KTY	PPIR	SNM	CHI	WGL	FON			30th	15	
2006	Vision Racing	90	Dallara	Honda	HMS	STP	MOT	INDY; 22	WGL	TXS	RIR	KAN	NSH	MIL	MIS	KTY	SNM	CHI						34th	12	
2008	Dreyer & Reinbold Racing	23	Dallara	Honda	HMS	STP; 21	MOT^{1} 10	LBH^{1} DNP	KAN		MIL; 11	TXS	IOW	RIR; 8	WGL	NSH	MOH	EDM; 25	KTY	SNM; 19	DET	CHI	SRF^{2} 23	26th	117	
2008	Dreyer & Reinbold Racing	99	Dallara	Honda						INDY; 10														26th	117	
2009	KV Racing Technology	8	Dallara IR5	Honda	STP	LBH	KAN	INDY; 4	MIL	TXS	IOW	RIR	WGL	TOR	EDM	KTY	MOH	SNM	CHI	MOT	HMS			32nd	32	
2010	Sam Schmidt Motorsports	99	Dallara IR5	Honda	SAO	STP	ALA	LBH	KAN	INDY; 16	TXS	IOW	WGL	TOR	EDM	MOH	SNM	CHI	KTY	MOT	HMS			38th	18	
2011	Sam Schmidt Motorsports	99	Dallara IR5	Honda	STP	ALA	LBH	SAO	INDY; 26	TXS2	TXS2	MIL	IOW	TOR	EDM	MOH	NHM	SNM	BAL	MOT				35th	40	
2011	Dreyer & Reinbold Racing	22	Dallara IR5	Honda																	KTY; 11	LVS^{3} C		35th	40	
2012	Schmidt–Hamilton Motorsports	99	Dallara DW12	Honda	STP	ALA	LBH	SAO	INDY; 9	DET	TXS	MIL	IOW	TOR	EDM	MOH	SNM	BAL	FON					30th	26	
2013	Panther Racing	60	Dallara DW12	Chevrolet	STP	ALA	LBH	SAO	INDY; 27	DET	DET	TXS	MIL	IOW	POC	TOR	TOR	MOH	SNM	BAL	HOU	HOU	FON	35th	10	
2014	KV Racing Technology	6	Dallara DW12	Chevrolet	STP	LBH	ALA	IMS	INDY; 25	DET	DET	TXS	HOU	HOU	POC	IOW	TOR	TOR	MOH	MIL	SNM	FON		32nd	22	
2015	Dreyer & Reinbold Racing	24	Dallara DW12	Chevrolet	STP	NLA	LBH	ALA	IMS	INDY; 14	DET	DET	TXS	TOR	FON	MIL	IOW	MOH	POC	SNM				35th	32	
2016	Andretti Autosport	29	Dallara DW12	Honda	STP	PHX	LBH	ALA	IMS	INDY; 21	DET	DET	RDA	IOW	TOR	MOH	POC	TXS	WGL	SNM				27th	55	

^{1} Run on same day.
^{2} Non-points race.
^{3} The Las Vegas Indy 300 was abandoned after Dan Wheldon died from injuries sustained in a 15-car crash on lap 11.

Years	Teams	Races	Poles	Wins	Podiums (non-win)	Top 10s (non-podium)	Indianapolis 500 wins	Championships
12	6	31	0	0	0	9	0	0

==== Indianapolis 500 ====
Year	Chassis	Engine	Start	Finish	Team
2006	Dallara	Honda	15	22	Vision Racing
2008	Dallara	Honda	12	10	Dreyer & Reinbold Racing
2009	Dallara	Honda	24	4	KV Racing Technology
2010	Dallara	Honda	10	16	Sam Schmidt Motorsports
2011	Dallara	Honda	4	26	Sam Schmidt Motorsports
2012	Dallara	Honda	20	9	Schmidt–Hamilton Motorsports
2013	Dallara	Chevrolet	22	27	Panther Racing
2014	Dallara	Chevrolet	25	25	KV Racing Technology
2015	Dallara	Chevrolet	24	14	Dreyer & Reinbold Kingdom Racing
2016	Dallara	Honda	4	21	Andretti Autosport

=== Complete International Formula 3000 results ===
(key)

Year	Entrant	1	2	3	4	5	6	7	8	9	10	DC	Points
2003	Arden International	IMO; 9	CAT; 12	A1R; 7	MON; 6	NUR; Ret	MAG; 12	SIL; 7	HOC; 5	HUN; 3	MNZ; Ret	9th	17

=== 24 Hours of Le Mans results ===
Year	Team	Co-Drivers	Car	Class	Laps	Pos.	Class Pos.
2015	(United States) Scuderia Corsa	(United States) Jeff Segal (United States) Bill Sweedler	Ferrari 458 Italia GT2	GTE; Am	330	24th	**3rd**
2016	(United States) Scuderia Corsa	(United States) Jeff Segal (United States) Bill Sweedler	Ferrari 458 Italia GT2	GTE; Am	331	26th	**1st**
2017	(United States) Scuderia Corsa	(United States) Bill Sweedler (United States) Cooper MacNeil	Ferrari 488 GTE	GTE; Am	331	29th	**3rd**

=== Complete IMSA SportsCar Championship results ===
(key) (Races in bold indicate pole position; results in italics indicate fastest lap)

Year	Team	Class	Make	Engine	1	2	3	4	5	6	7	8	9	10	11	12	Pos.	Points
2014	Level 5 Motorsports	GTD	Ferrari 458 Italia GT3	Ferrari 4.5L V8	DAY; 1												4th	293
2014	AIM Autosport	GTD	Ferrari 458 Italia GT3	Ferrari 4.5L V8		SEB; 2	LGA; 14	DET; 8	WGL; 2	MOS; 13	IMS; 4	ELK; 5	VIR; 8	COA; 8	PET; 7		4th	293
2015	Scuderia Corsa	GTD	Ferrari 458 Italia GT3	Ferrari 4.5L V8	DAY; 6	SEB; 3	LGA; 4	DET; 9	WGL; 4	LIM; 9	ELK; 4	VIR; 1	COA; 6	PET; 4			1st	281
2018	Scuderia Corsa	GTD	Ferrari 488 GT3	Ferrari F154CB 3.9L Turbo V8	DAY; 5	SEB; 17	MOH	DET	WGL; 10	MOS	LIM	ELK	VIR	LGA; 9	PET; 5		17th	109
2019	AIM Vasser Sullivan	GTD	Lexus RC F GT3	Lexus 5.0L V8	DAY; 2	SEB; 9	MOH; 5	DET; 3	WGL; 9	MOS; 3	LIM; 13	ELK; 9	VIR; 7	LGA; 11	PET; 11		8th	236
2020	AIM Vasser Sullivan	GTD	Lexus RC F GT3	Lexus 5.0L V8	DAY; 12	DAY; 2	**SEB**; 5	ELK; 1	VIR; 10	**ATL**; 5	MOH; 10	CLT; 4	PET; 8	LGA; 8	SEB; 9		6th	251
2021	Vasser Sullivan Racing	GTD	Lexus RC F GT3	Lexus 5.0L V8	DAY; 13	SEB	MOH	DET; 5	WGL	WGL	LIM	ELK	LGA	LBH	VIR	PET	66th	202
2022	VasserSullivan	GTD	Lexus RC F GT3	Toyota 2UR 5.0 L V8	DAY; 15	SEB	LBH	LGA	MOH	DET	WGL	MOS	LIM	ELK	VIR	PET	63rd	190
2025	Vasser Sullivan Racing	GTD Pro	Lexus RC F GT3	Toyota 2UR-GSE 5.0 L V8	DAY; 11	SEB	LGA	DET	WGL	MOS	ELK	VIR	IMS	PET			41st	216

Sporting positions
Preceded by Scott Dixon	Indy Lights Champion; 2001	Succeeded by A. J. Foyt IV (Infiniti Pro Series)
