= Alex Job Racing =

Former sports car racing team

- Founded: 1988
- Team principal(s): Alex Job
- Current series: United SportsCar Championship
- Former series: American Le Mans Series; Rolex Sports Car Series; IMSA GT3 Cup Challenge
- Teams' Championships: 4 (2002, 2003, 2004, 2012)
- Drivers' Championships: 5 (2002, 2003, 2004, 2012, 2013)

Alex Job Racing is a former professional sports car racing team based in the United States. The team, which is noted for its long-time association with Porsche, has competed in the American Le Mans Series, the IMSA GT3 Cup Challenge series, and the Rolex Sports Car Series, and fields a two-car effort in the Tudor United SportsCar Championship. On November 22, 2017, it was announced that Alex Job Racing will cease its professional racing operations to focus on its historic restoration and competition business.

== Early history ==
Alex Job Racing was established in 1988 by Alex and Holly Job at their home in Florida. Alex Job raced sports cars, beginning with a Porsche 356 in 1969 and in 1976 competed in the 24 Hours of Daytona. After finishing second at the 12 Hours of Sebring in 1991, Alex Job moved the team into a commercial shop and then retired from racing the following year.

== American Le Mans Series ==
=== 1999 (Privateer Team) ===
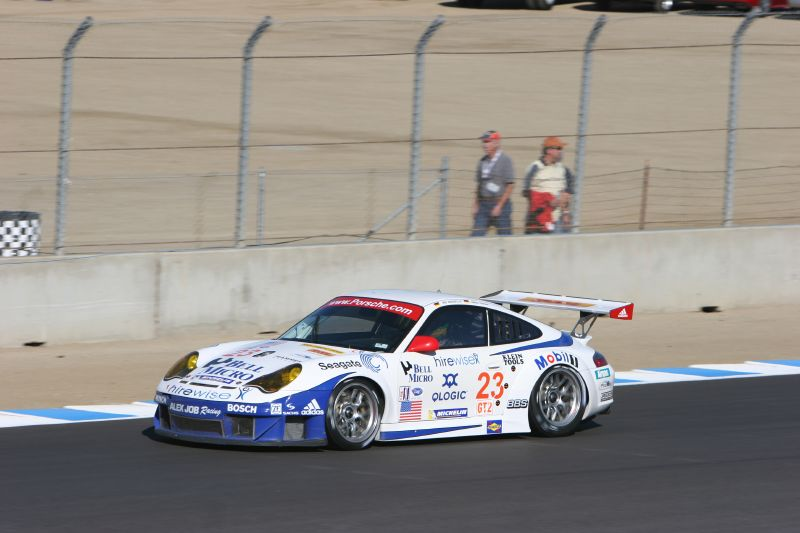
Mazda Raceway Laguna Seca

In 1999, for the inaugural season of IMSA's American Le Mans Series, Alex Job Racing competed with a Porsche 993 Carrera RSR. The team claimed a victory at the season opening 12 Hours of Sebring and again at Mosport and the team would finish the season 2nd in the GT Teams' Championship.

=== 2000–06 (factory support) ===
For the 2000 season, the team ran the new 996 GT3-R chassis. Claiming victories at Mosport and the Texas Motor Speedway but failing to finish the season opening 12 Hours of Sebring and the season finale at Adelaide, the team finished second in the GT Teams' Championship to Dick Barbour Racing with drivers Randy Pobst fifth and Bruno Lambert sixth in the Drivers' Championship.

The 2001 season saw even more success for the team. Claiming three straight victories in the first three races, the team finished second to the BMW Motorsport team in the increasingly competitive GT category. Drivers Lucas Luhr and Sascha Maassen finished third and fourth in the Drivers' Championship.

The team's hard work paid off in the 2002 season as the team expanded to a two-car operation. With Timo Bernhard and Jorg Bergmeister piloting the #22 car, and Sascha Maassen and Lucas Luhr sharing the #23 car, the team claimed wins at eight of ten races finishing the season first in the GT class Teams’ Championship with Maassen and Luhr winning the Drivers’ Championship.

The 2003 season would see record-breaking success from the Alex Job Racing team. With the same driver line-up as the previous season, the team would win all but one race at Road America and claim pole position and set the fastest race lap at every event. The team finished the season first in the GT Teams’ Championship with drivers Maassen and Luhr first and Bernhard and Bergmeister second in the Drivers’ Championship. The team also helped develop Porsche's sequential gearbox that would be used on all cars worldwide the following year.

The 2004 season would see even tougher competition for the team. Timo Bernhard and Jorg Bergmeister again piloted the #23 car with the new addition of Marc Lieb and Romain Dumas sharing the #24 car. Despite strong efforts from Flying Lizard Motorsports and Risi Competizione, the team claimed wins at seven of nine races. The team finished the season first in the GT class Teams’ Championship.

2005 saw a shift for the team, running only a single factory-supported car piloted by Timo Bernhard and Romain Dumas. The second car was driven by Ian Baas and Darren Law. Having scored no points at the season opening 12 Hours of Sebring, the team won four races in a row at Mid-Ohio, Lime Rock, Infineon, and Portland. By season's end they would finish second in the GT2 Teams' Championship behind the Petersen/White Lightning group.

The Alex Job Racing team ran only a single car, piloted for the majority of the season by Mike Rockenfeller and Marcel Tiemann for the 2006 season. The team faced much tougher competition from Risi Competizione, Flying Lizard Motorsports, and the Petersen/White Lightning group. By season's end they would claim only a single win at the Reliant Park street circuit, the team's 50th profession win, and would finish fifth in the GT2 Teams' Championship with Mike Rockenfeller tenth in the Drivers' Championship.

=== 2010-13 (customer program) ===
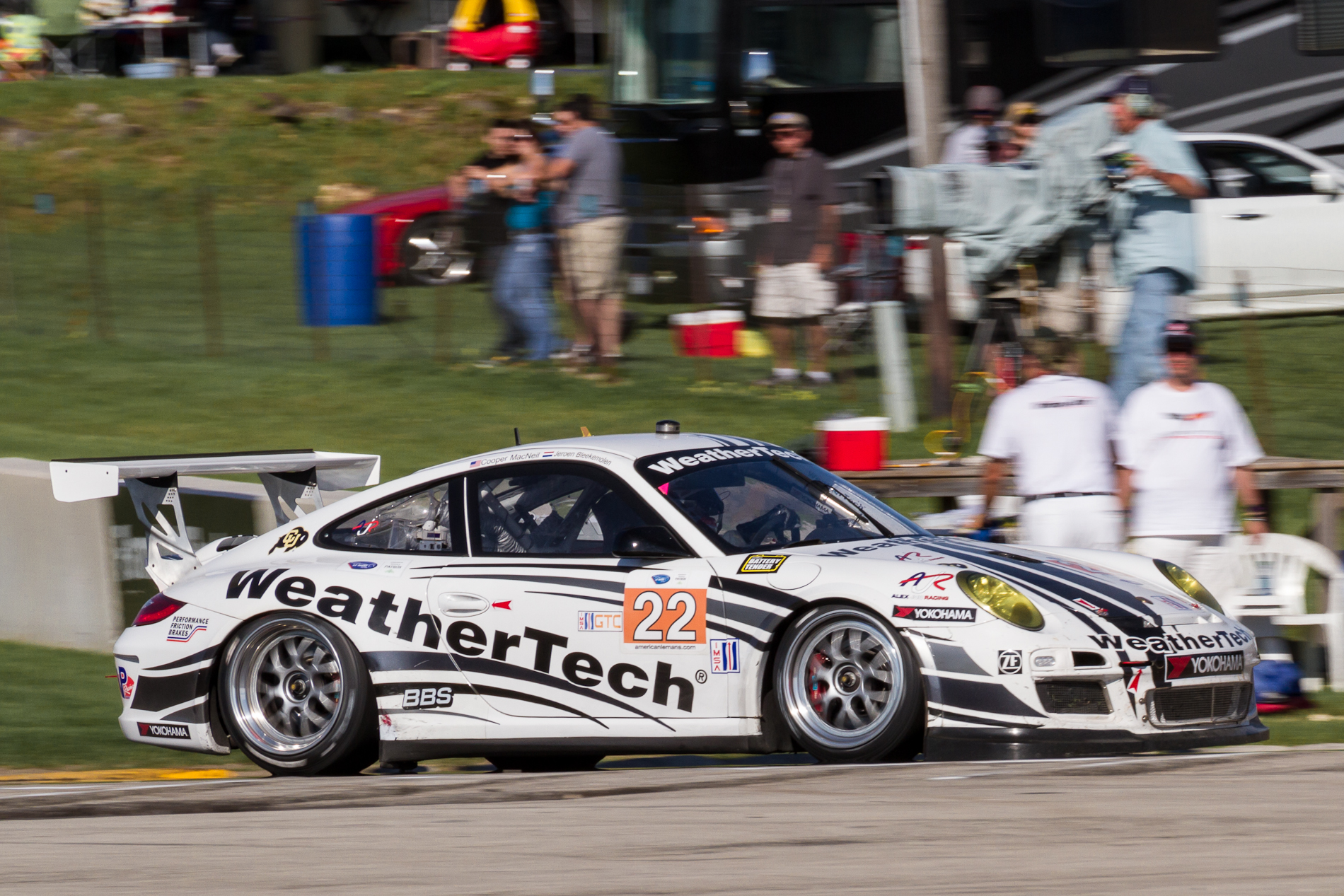
Alex Job Racing Weathertech Porsche 997 GT3 Cup driven by Cooper MacNeil and Leh Keen at Road America.

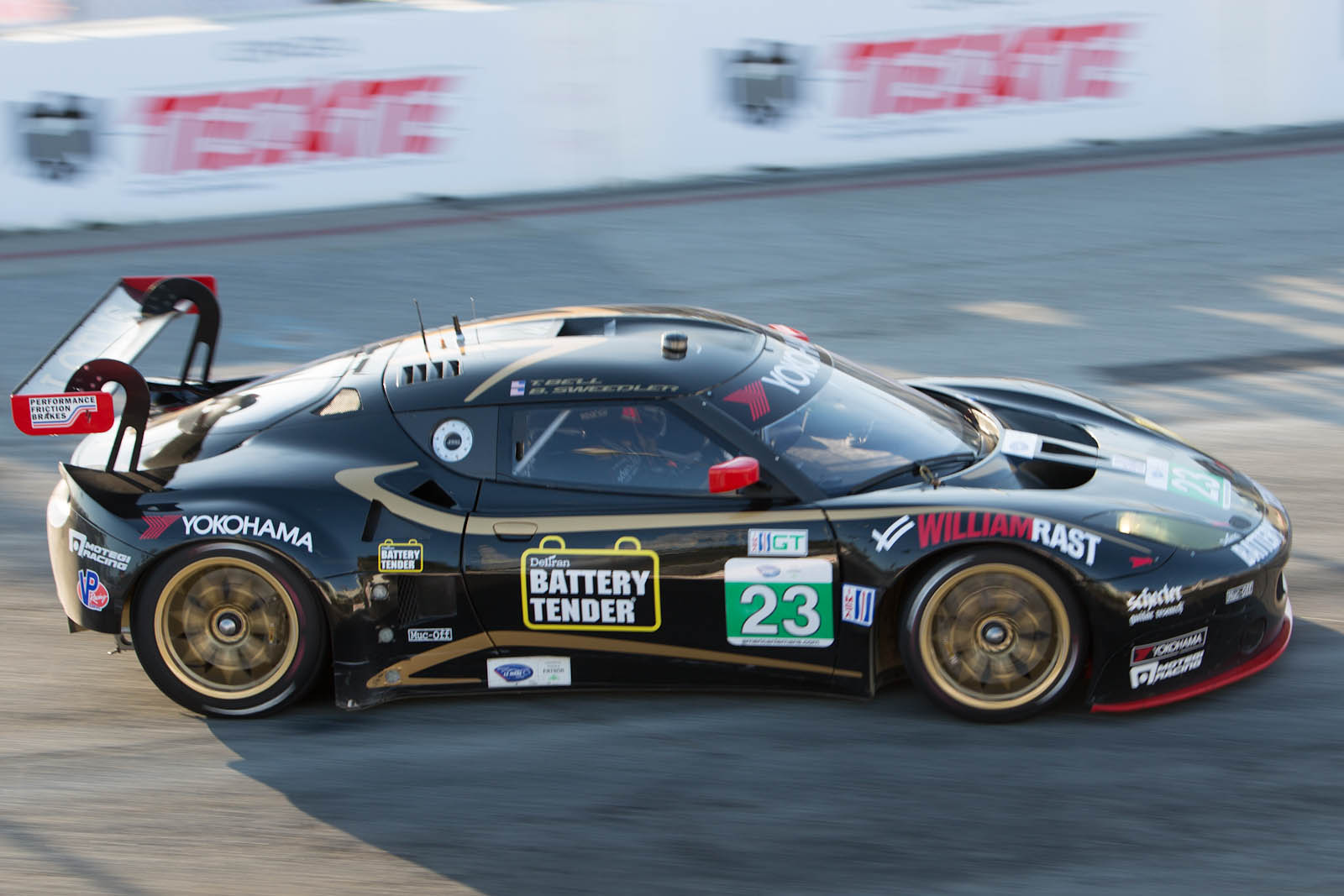
Alex Job Racing Lotus Evora GTE driven by Bill Sweedler and Townsend Bell at the Toyota Grand Prix of Long Beach.

In 2010 the team return to competition in the American Le Mans Series with a customer program in the newly formed GT Challenge class. Bill Sweedler and Romeo Kapudija would compete together in a full season effort with Juan González and Butch Leitzinger competing in a second car for the first four races. González and Leitzinger, with the help of Leh Keen would score a victory at the season opening 12 Hours of Sebring followed by a second win at Long Beach. The team would finish the season second in the GTC Teams' Championship with full season drivers Sweedler and Kapudija fifth and sixth, respectively, in the Drivers' Championship.

The team only ran a single car driven by Bill Sweedler and Leh Keen for the 2011 season with Brian Wong and Butch Leitzinger substituting for Keen at certain races. The team faced tough competition from Tim Pappas and the Black Swan Racing Team. With three second-place finishes, the team finished second in the GTC Teams' Championship with Bill Sweedler fourth in the Drivers' Championship.

The 2012 season saw Alex Job Racing compete in both the GTC class with a Cooper MacNeil and Leh Keen driven Porsche 997 GT3 Cup and in the GT class with a Townsend Bell and Bill Sweedler–driven Lotus Evora GTE that started at the second round of the season in Long Beach. Claiming three class victories and finishing the season with consistent results earned Alex Job Racing the GTC Teams’ and Drivers’ Championships. The Lotus Evora program was less successful. With no support to develop the car from Lotus, the team struggled to bring the car up to speed in the more competitive GT class. Townsend Bell and Bill Sweedler finished the season 17th in the Drivers’ Championship and 7th in the Teams’ Championship.

The 2013 season would be the final season of the American Le Mans Series before it merged with the Rolex Sports Car Series for the 2014 season. For 2013, the team continued its championship winning GTC program and also partnered with West Racing to campaign a Ferrari 458 GT2, replacing the failed Lotus Evora program. This year Cooper Macneil teamed with Jeroen Bleekemolen in the Porsche while the Ferrari was piloted by last year's team of Townsend Bell and Bill Sweedler. Despite only claiming two class wins, the team's consistent performance earned them their second GTC Drivers’ Championship, while the Teams’ Championship went to the Flying Lizard Motorsports team. The teams GT campaigned started the year at Sebring with a suspension failure-induced wreck and subsequent DNF. The team however repaired the car and campaign the rest of the season. Bill Sweedler and Townsend Bell finished 16th and 15th in the Drivers’ Championship and 8th in the Teams Championship.

== Rolex Sports Car Series ==
In 2006, the Alex Job Racing team competed for the first time in the Grand Am Rolex Sports Car Series with a Porsche-powered Daytona Prototype. Drivers Mike Rockenfeller and Patrick Long recorded two overall wins at Homestead and Virginia International Raceway. By season's end, Rockenfeller would finish 5th in the Drivers' Championship.

In 2007, the team's second full season of competition, drivers Patrick Long and Jorg Bergmeister, would claim an overall win at Laguna Seca as well as three top-five finishes and eleven top-ten results. Long would finish the season seventh in the Daytona Prototype Drivers' Championship.

In 2008 would claim two podium finishes as well as three top-five and seven top-ten results. Full season drivers Bill Auberlen and Joey Hand would finish outside the top ten in the Daytona Prototype Drivers' Championship.

== United SportsCar Championship ==
With the merging of the American Le Mans Series and the Rolex Sports Car Series for the 2014 season, the Alex Job Racing team would field a two car Porsche 911 GT America effort in the new GT Daytona class. Cooper MacNeil would team with Leh Keen in the WeatherTech entry while Mario Farnbacher and Ian James would pilot the "Heart of Racing" entry in partnership with Team Seattle. Macneil and Keen managed a season best second-place finish at Road America and the pair finished second in the GTD Drivers' Championship. The pair of Farnbacher and James claimed a second-place finish at Belle Isle with Farnbacher ending the season tenth in the Drivers' Championship.

== 24 Hours of Le Mans results ==
Year	Entrant	No.	Car	Drivers	Class	Laps	Pos.	Class Pos.
2003	(United States) Alex Job Racing (United States) Petersen Motorsports	93	Porsche 911 GT3-RS	(France) Emmanuel Collard (Germany) Lucas Luhr (Germany) Sascha Maassen	LMGT	320	14th	1st
2005	(United States) Alex Job Racing (United States) British American Motorsport (BAM!)	71	Porsche 911 GT3-RSR	(United States) Leo Hindery (Germany) Marc Lieb (Germany) Mike Rockenfeller	LMGT2	332	10th	1st
