= Bill Sweedler =

American racing driver (born 1966)

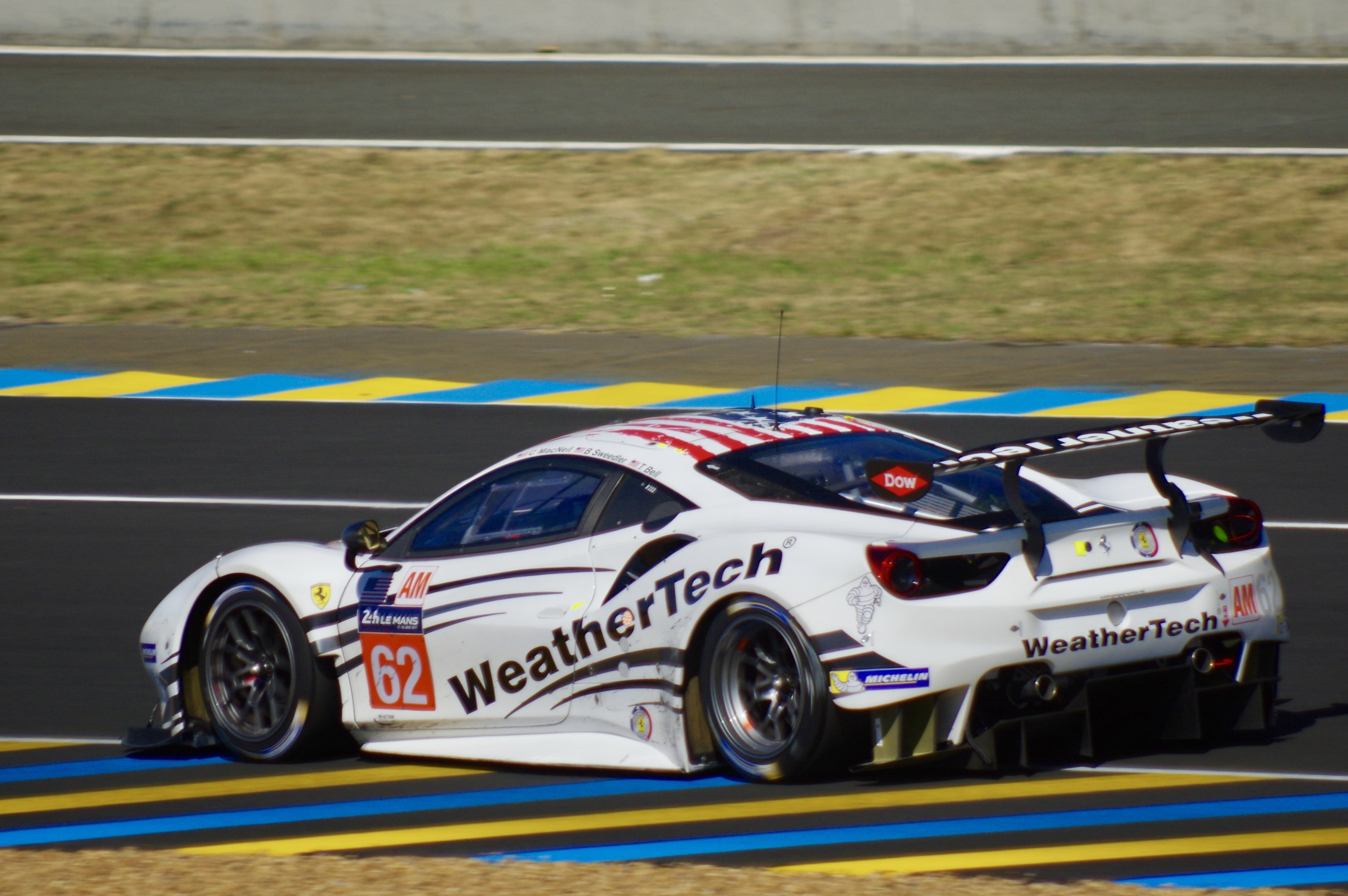
- Sweedler in 2017
- Nationality: (United States) American
- Born: William Sweedler; October 11, 1966 (age 60) Westport, Connecticut, U.S.
- Categorisation: FIA Silver (until 2014); FIA Bronze (2015–)

Championship titles
- 2015: United SportsCar Championship – GTD

William Sweedler (born October 11, 1966) is an American businessman and racing driver who last competed in the GTD class of the IMSA SportsCar Championship for TR3 Racing. He is a past IMSA champion and 24 Hours of Le Mans class winner, both for Scuderia Corsa.

== Business ventures ==
Sweedler began working at Ralph Lauren in 1989, before founding Windsong Allegiance Group in 1994 and later working for Iconix Brand Group from 2005 to 2006. Towards the end of the year, Sweedler founded Windsong Global and five years later co-founded Tengram Capital Partners.

== Racing career ==
Sweedler made his car racing debut in 2007, racing in the SCCA Mazda MX-5 Cup for PRX Comosport on a part-time schedule. Two years in the Porsche GT3 Cup Challenge USA for Orbit Racing then ensued, as well as a campaign in the Challenge cup of the 2009 American Le Mans Series, in which he scored a lone podium at Lime Rock to finish fifth in points.

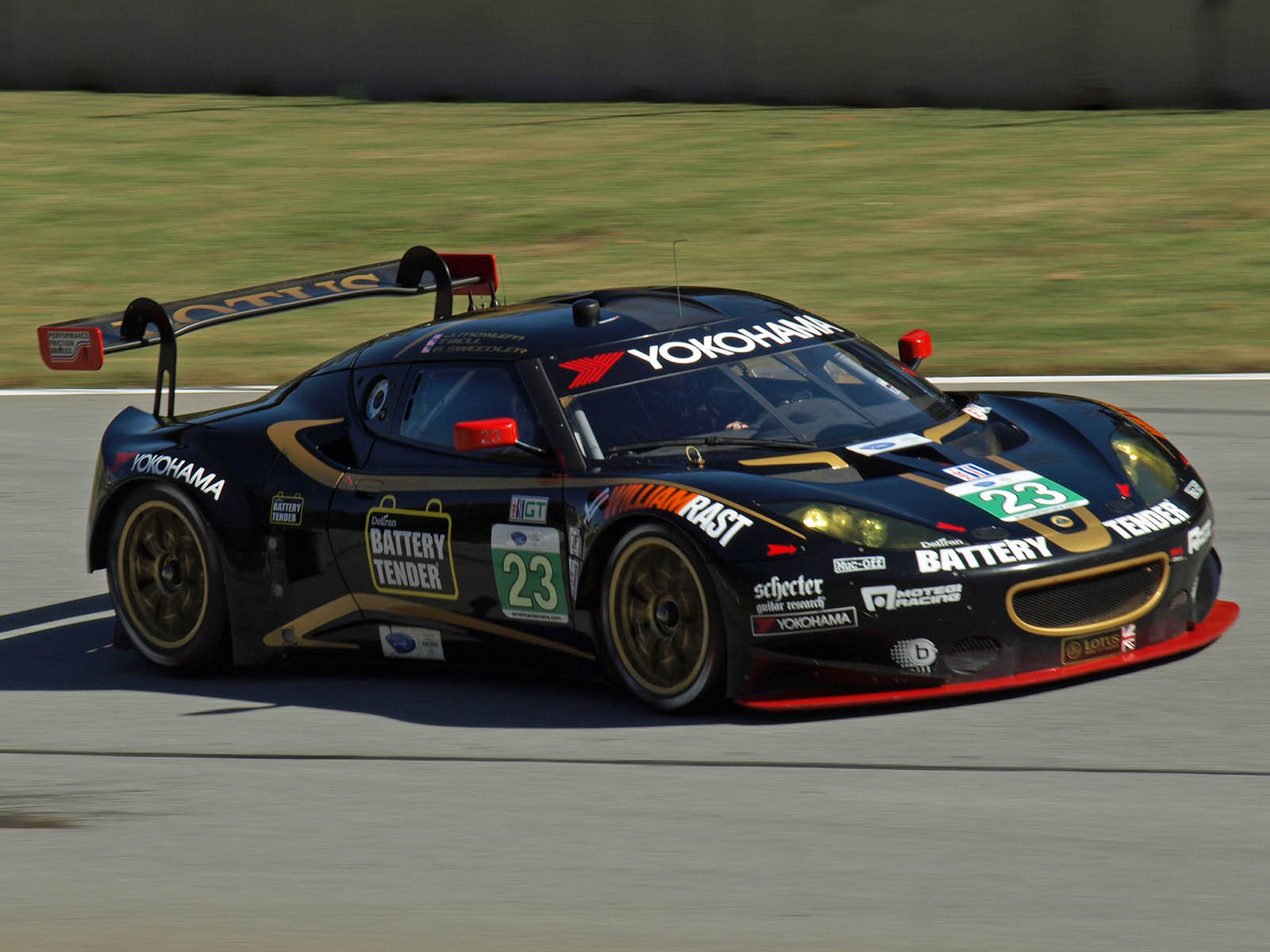
Sweedler pedaling his Alex Job Racing Lotus at Petit Le Mans in 2012.

Switching to ALMS powerhouse Alex Job Racing for 2010, Sweedler took a best result of second at the 12 Hours of Sebring and three third-place finishes across the rest of the year to end the year fifth in the GT Challenge standings. Remaining with Alex Job Racing for 2011, Sweedler finished second at Long Beach, Baltimore and the Petit Le Mans as he rounded out the year fourth in the GT Challenge points. During 2011, Sweedler also made his 24 Hours of Daytona debut, driving for fellow Porsche outfit Chris Smith Racing in the GT class.

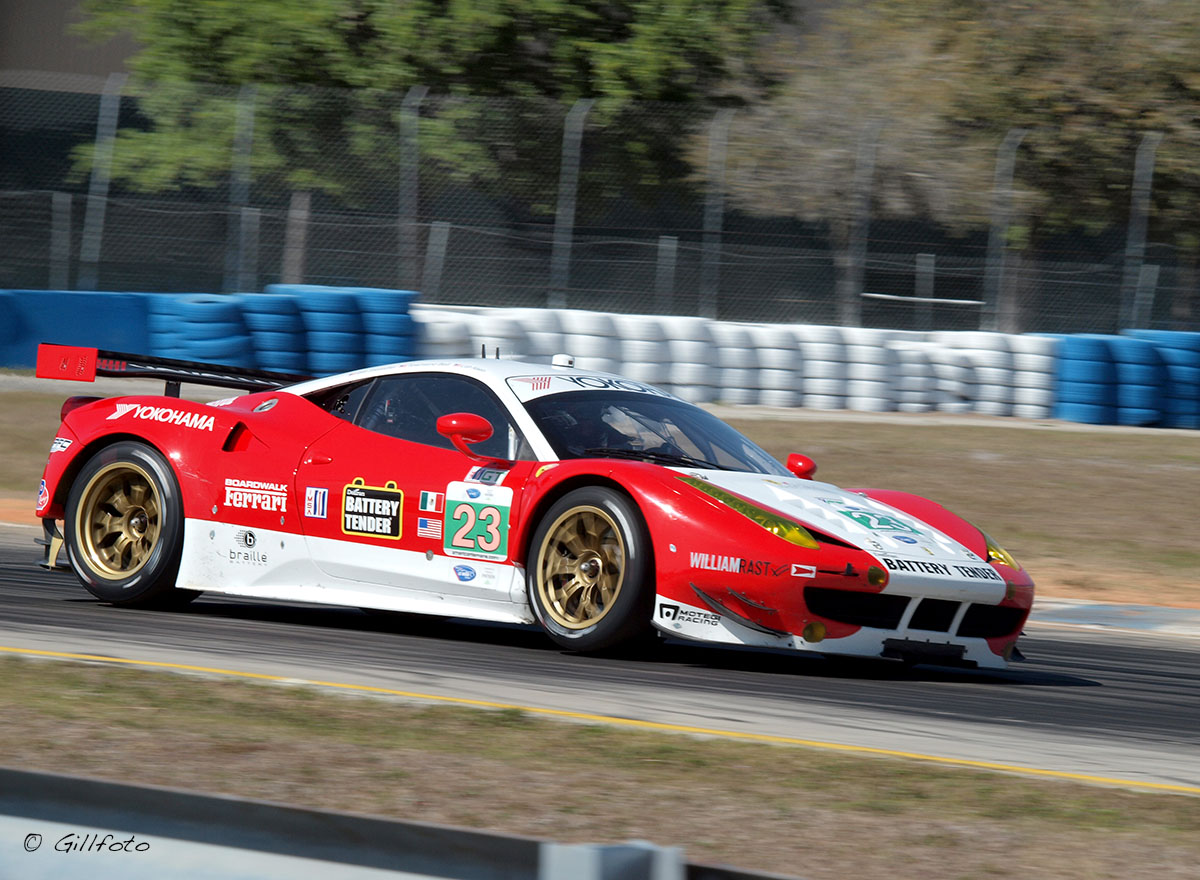
Sweedler's AJR-run Boardwalk Ferrari at the 2013 12 Hours of Sebring.

At the start of 2012, Sweedler continued with AJR to race in the 24 Hours of Daytona and the 12 Hours of Sebring, the latter of which he won in the GT Challenge class. For the rest of the year, Sweedler continued with the team as it fielded a Lotus Evora in the GT class, scoring a best result of sixth at VIR to end the year 17th in the class standings. Sweedler continued with the team for 2013 as they switched to a Ferrari 458 Italia GT2, taking a best result of fourth at Laguna Seca as he rounded out the season 15th in the GT standings.

Continuing with Ferrari machinery for 2014, Sweedler joined Level 5 Motorsports to compete in the newly-renamed United SportsCar Championship, with whom he won the 24 Hours of Daytona in GTD alongside Townsend Bell, Alessandro Pier Guidi, Jeff Segal and Scott Tucker. After Level 5 withdrew from the series after the race, Sweedler joined AIM Motorsport for the rest of the year, taking a pair of second-place finishes at Sebring and Watkins Glen en route to fourth in the points standings.

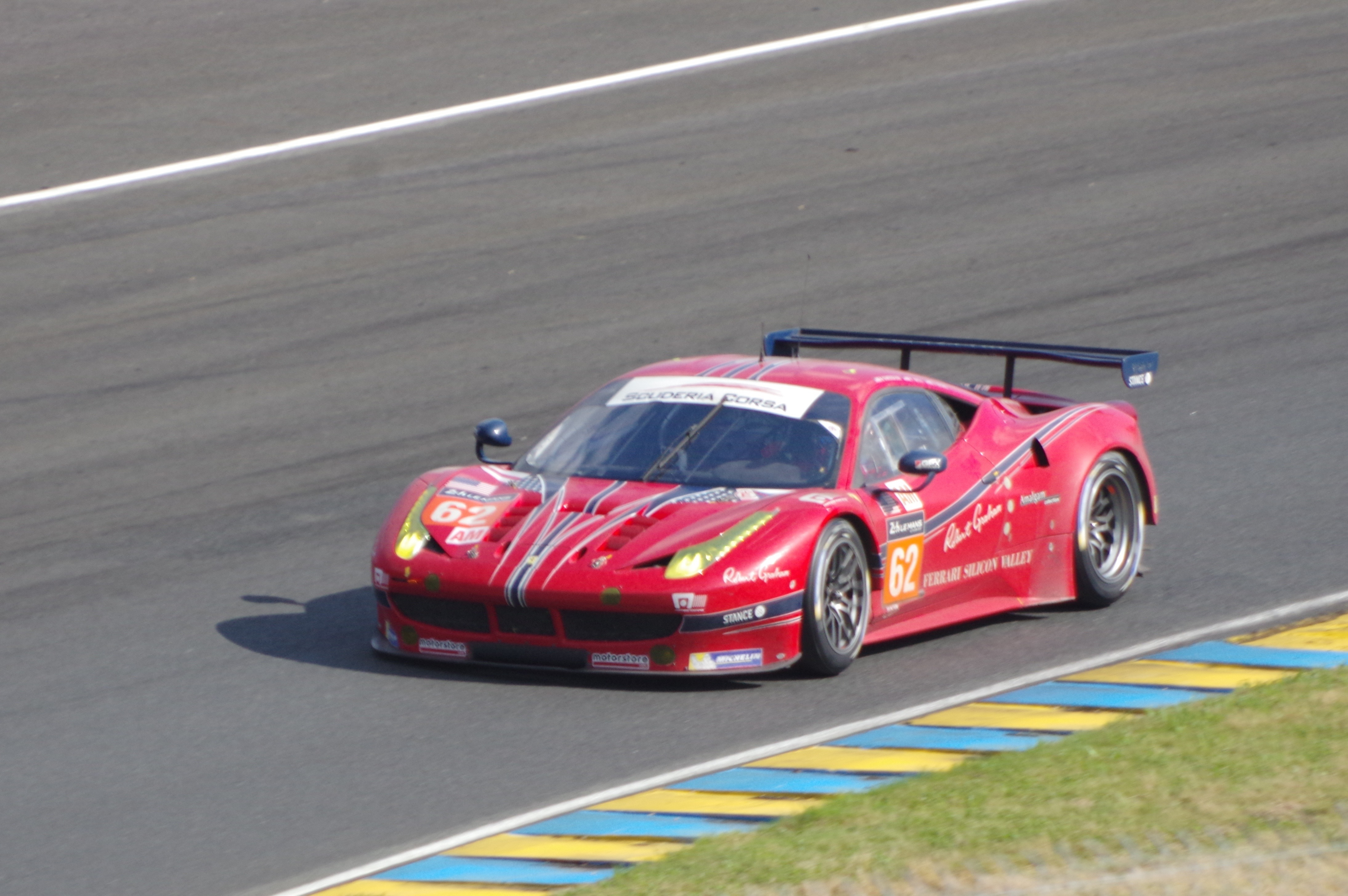
Sweedler's stint with Scuderia Corsa yielded an IMSA title in 2015 and a 24 Hours of Le Mans win (pictured) in 2016.

Joining Scuderia Corsa alongside Bell for the following season, Sweedler scored a lone win at VIR and a podium at the 12 Hours of Sebring to clinch the GTD title at season's end. During 2015, Sweedler also raced for the team in the 24 Hours of Le Mans, finishing third in LMGTE Am at his first appearance at the event. In 2016, Sweedler began the year with O'Gara Motorsport, driving a Lamborghini Huracán for the 24 Hours of Daytona, before switching to fellow Lamborghini customer team Change Racing for the following two rounds. During 2016, Sweedler also returned to Scuderia Corsa for a one-off round of the Pirelli World Challenge and the 24 Hours of Le Mans, the latter of which resulted in a historic LMGTE Am win for the all-American trio.

The following year, Sweedler returned to now-Audi-aligned Alex Job Racing for select rounds of the IMSA SportsCar Championship, scoring a best result of sixth twice and ending the year 25th in the GTD standings. During 2017, Sweedler also raced in the 24 Hours of Le Mans for Scuderia Corsa, finishing third in LMGTE Am in his third appearance at the event. In 2018, Sweedler remained with Scuderia Corsa to race in the endurance rounds of the IMSA SportsCar Championship, in which he took a best result of fifth at the 24 Hours of Daytona. After a year on the sidelines, Sweedler made select appearances in GT World Challenge America for Lamborghini squad TR3 Racing in both 2020 and 2021, before competing with them in the 24 Hours of Daytona the following year in GTD.

== Racing record ==
=== Racing career summary ===
Season	Series	Team	Races	Wins	Poles	F/Laps	Podiums	Points	Position
2007	SCCA Mazda MX-5 Cup	PRX Comosport	6	0	0	0	0	58	18th
2008	Porsche GT3 Cup Challenge USA – Platinum	Orbit Racing	10	0	0	0	0	47	17th
2008	SCCA Mazda MX-5 Cup		2	0	0	0	0	25	38th
2009	Porsche GT3 Cup Challenge USA – Platinum	Orbit Racing	10	0	0	0	3	103	8th
2009	American Le Mans Series – Challenge	Orbit Racing	5	0	0	0	1	39	5th
2010	American Le Mans Series – GTC	Alex Job Racing	9	0	0	0	4	109	5th
2011	Rolex Sports Car Series – GT	Chris Smith Racing	1	0	0	0	0	16	57th
2011	American Le Mans Series – GTC	Alex Job Racing	9	0	0	0	4	117	4th
2012	Rolex Sports Car Series – GT	Alex Job Racing	1	0	0	0	0	17	67th
2012	American Le Mans Series – GTC	Alex Job Racing	1	1	0	0	1	0	NC
2012	American Le Mans Series – GT	Lotus / Alex Job Racing	9	0	0	0	0	21	17th
2013	American Le Mans Series – GT	Team West/AJR/Boardwalk Ferrari	8	0	0	0	0	35	15th
2014	United SportsCar Championship – GTD	Level 5 Motorsports	1	1	0	0	1	293	4th
2014	United SportsCar Championship – GTD	AIM Autosport	10	0	0	0	2	293	4th
2015	United SportsCar Championship – GTD	Scuderia Corsa	10	1	0	0	2	281	**1st**
2015	24 Hours of Le Mans – LMGTE Am	Scuderia Corsa	1	0	0	0	1	—N/a	**3rd**
2015	Ferrari Challenge North America – Trofeo Pirelli	Ferrari of Beverly Hills	1	0	0	0	0	0	NC
2016	IMSA SportsCar Championship – GTD	O'Gara Motorsport	1	0	0	0	0	35	36th
2016	IMSA SportsCar Championship – GTD	Change Racing	2	0	0	0	0	35	36th
2016	Pirelli World Challenge – GTA	Scuderia Corsa	1	0	0	0	0	0	18th
2016	24 Hours of Le Mans – LMGTE Am	Scuderia Corsa	1	1	0	0	1	—N/a	**1st**
2017	IMSA SportsCar Championship – GTD	Alex Job Racing	5	0	0	0	0	106	25th
2017	24 Hours of Le Mans – LMGTE Am	Scuderia Corsa	1	0	0	0	1	—N/a	**3rd**
2018	IMSA SportsCar Championship – GTD	Scuderia Corsa	3	0	0	0	0	61	36th
2020	GT World Challenge America – Am	TR3 Racing	2	2	0	0	2	50	**2nd**
2021	GT World Challenge America – Am	TR3 Racing	3	0	0	0	2	36	**2nd**
2021	GT World Challenge America – Pro-Am	TR3 Racing	1	0	0	0	0	0	NC†
2021	Intercontinental GT Challenge	TR3 Racing	1	0	0	0	0	0	NC
2022	IMSA SportsCar Championship – GTD	TR3 Racing	1	0	0	0	0	218	60th

^{†} As Sweedler was a guest driver, he was ineligible for championship points.

=== Complete American Le Mans Series results ===
(key) (Races in bold indicate pole position)

Year	Team	Class	Make	Engine	1	2	3	4	5	6	7	8	9	10	Rank	Points	Ref
2009	Orbit Racing	GTC	Porsche 997 GT3 Cup	Porsche 3.8 L Flat-6	UTA; DSQ	LRP; 2	MDO; Ret	ELK; 5	LAG; 4						5th	39	
2010	Alex Job Racing	GTC	Porsche 997 GT3 Cup	Porsche 3.8 L Flat-6	SEB; 2	LBH; 3	LAG; 7	UTA; 8	LRP; 6	MDO; 3	ELK; 4	MOS; 3	PET; 7		5th	109	
2011	Alex Job Racing	GTC	Porsche 997 GT3 Cup	Porsche 3.8 L Flat-6	SEB; 8	LBH; 2	LRP; 3	MOS; 4	MDO; 5	ELK; Ret	BAL; 2	LAG; 4	PET; 2		4th	117	
2012	Alex Job Racing	GTC	Porsche 997 GT3 Cup	Porsche 4.0 L Flat-6	SEB; 1										NC	0	
2012	Lotus / Alex Job Racing	GT	Lotus Evora GTE	Toyota (Cosworth) 4.0 L V6		LBH; 12	LAG; 12	LRP; 10	MOS; 8	MDO; 11	ELK; 7	BAL; 10	VIR; 6	PET; 11	17th	21	
2013	Team West/AJR/Boardwalk Ferrari	GT	Ferrari 458 Italia GT2	Ferrari 4.5 L V8	SEB; Ret	LBH; 7	LGA; 4	LIM; 9	MOS	ELK	BAL; 7	COT; 8	VIR; 10	PET; 9	15th	35	

=== Complete Grand-Am Rolex Sports Car Series results ===
(key) (Races in bold indicate pole position; results in italics indicate fastest lap)

Year	Team	Class	Make	Engine	1	2	3	4	5	6	7	8	9	10	11	12	13	Rank	Points	Ref
2011	Chris Smith Racing	GT	Porsche 911 GT3 Cup	Porsche 4.0L F6	DAY; 19	MIA	BAR	VIR	LIM	WGL	ELK	LAG	NJMP	WGL	CGV	MOH		57th	16	
2012	Alex Job Racing	GT	Porsche 911 GT3 Cup	Porsche 4.0L F6	DAY; 14	BAR	MIA	NJMP	BEL	MOH	ELK	WGL	IMS	WGL	CGV	LAG	LIM	67th	17	

=== Complete IMSA SportsCar Championship results ===
(key) (Races in bold indicate pole position; results in italics indicate fastest lap)

Year	Team	Class	Make	Engine	1	2	3	4	5	6	7	8	9	10	11	12	Pos.	Points	Ref
2014	Level 5 Motorsports	GTD	Ferrari 458 Italia GT3	Ferrari 4.5L V8	DAY; 1												4th	293	
2014	AIM Autosport	GTD	Ferrari 458 Italia GT3	Ferrari 4.5L V8		SEB; 2	LGA; 14	DET; 8	WGL; 2	MOS; 13	IMS; 4	ELK; 5	VIR; 8	COA; 8	PET; 7		4th	293	
2015	Scuderia Corsa	GTD	Ferrari 458 Italia GT3	Ferrari 4.5L V8	DAY; 6	SEB; 3	LGA; 4	DET; 9	WGL; 4	LIM; 9	ELK; 4	VIR; 1	COA; 6	PET; 4			1st	281	
2016	O'Gara Motorsport	GTD	Lamborghini Huracán GT3	Lamborghini DGF 5.2 L V10	DAY; 15												36th	35	
2016	Change Racing	GTD	Lamborghini Huracán GT3	Lamborghini DGF 5.2 L V10		SEB; 18†	LGA; 15	BEL	WGL	MOS	LIM	ELK	VIR	AUS	PET		36th	35	
2017	Alex Job Racing	GTD	Audi R8 LMS	Audi 5.2L V10	DAY; 6	SEB; 15	LBH	COT	DET	WGL; 14	MOS	LIM; 8	ELK	VIR	LGA	PET; 6	25th	106	
2018	Scuderia Corsa	GTD	Ferrari 488 GT3	Ferrari F154CB 3.9L Turbo V8	DAY; 5	SEB; 17	MDO	DET	WGL; 10	MOS	LIM	ELK	VIR	LGA	PET		36th	61	
2022	TR3 Racing	GTD	Lamborghini Huracán GT3 Evo	Lamborghini 5.2 L V10	DAY; 11	SEB	LBH	LGA	MDO	DET	WGL	MOS	LIM	ELK	VIR	PET	60th	218	

=== Complete 24 Hours of Le Mans results ===
Year	Team	Co-Drivers	Car	Class	Laps	Pos.	Class Pos.
2015	(United States) Scuderia Corsa	(United States) Jeff Segal (United States) Townsend Bell	Ferrari 458 Italia GT2	LMGTE Am	330	24th	**3rd**
2016	(United States) Scuderia Corsa	(United States) Jeff Segal (United States) Townsend Bell	Ferrari 458 Italia GT2	LMGTE Am	331	26th	**1st**
2017	(United States) Scuderia Corsa	(United States) Townsend Bell (United States) Cooper MacNeil	Ferrari 488 GTE	LMGTE Am	331	29th	**3rd**
