= Level 5 Motorsports =

American racecar team

(United States) Level 5 Motorsports
- Founded: 2006
- Team principal(s): Scott Tucker
- Current series: United SportsCar Championship; Ferrari Challenge
- Teams' Championships: 4
- Drivers' Championships: 10

Level 5 Motorsports was an American auto racing team founded in 2006 with illegally procured funds by racing driver, money lender and later convicted racketeer Scott Tucker, currently serving a sentence of 16 years and 8 months in federal prison. Level 5 Motorsports competed in the United SportsCar Championship and Ferrari Challenge, having won multiple American Le Mans Series championships and endurance races including the 24 Hours of Daytona, 12 Hours of Sebring and Petit Le Mans. Level 5 Motorsports began with Tucker competing in the Sports Car Club of America and Ferrari Challenge Series. In 2007, while continuing with SCCA and Ferrari Challenge, Tucker entered several events in the Rolex Sports Car Series and Koni Challenge Series with co-driver Ed Zabinski. Tucker also competed in the IMSA GT3 Cup Challenge.

== Grand-Am ==
In 2008, the team made four starts in the Rolex Series including the Rolex 24 At Daytona.

In 2009, Level 5 Motorsports became a regular in the Rolex Sports Car Series. The team finished 9th in class at the 24 Hours of Daytona driving a BMW Powered Daytona Prototype. Christophe Bouchut finished 23rd and Scott Tucker (racing driver) finished 31st in the Drivers Championship. Tucker also had a record-setting season in the Ferrari Challenge, winning 10 races. That year, Tucker also earned his first national title, winning the SCCA Touring 1 Class National Championship.

In 2010, Level 5 Motorsports entered the Rolex 24 at Daytona. The team of Scott Tucker, Ryan Hunter-Reay, Lucas Luhr and Richard Westbrook took a third-place overall finish. Scott Tucker and Christophe Bouchut entered one more Rolex Series race, finishing 11th overall in Miami.

In 2011, the team started the year at the 24 Hours of Daytona where they competed with two BMW powered Riley Daytona Prototype. The #55 car finished 8th and the #95 car finished 11th.

== American Le Mans Series ==
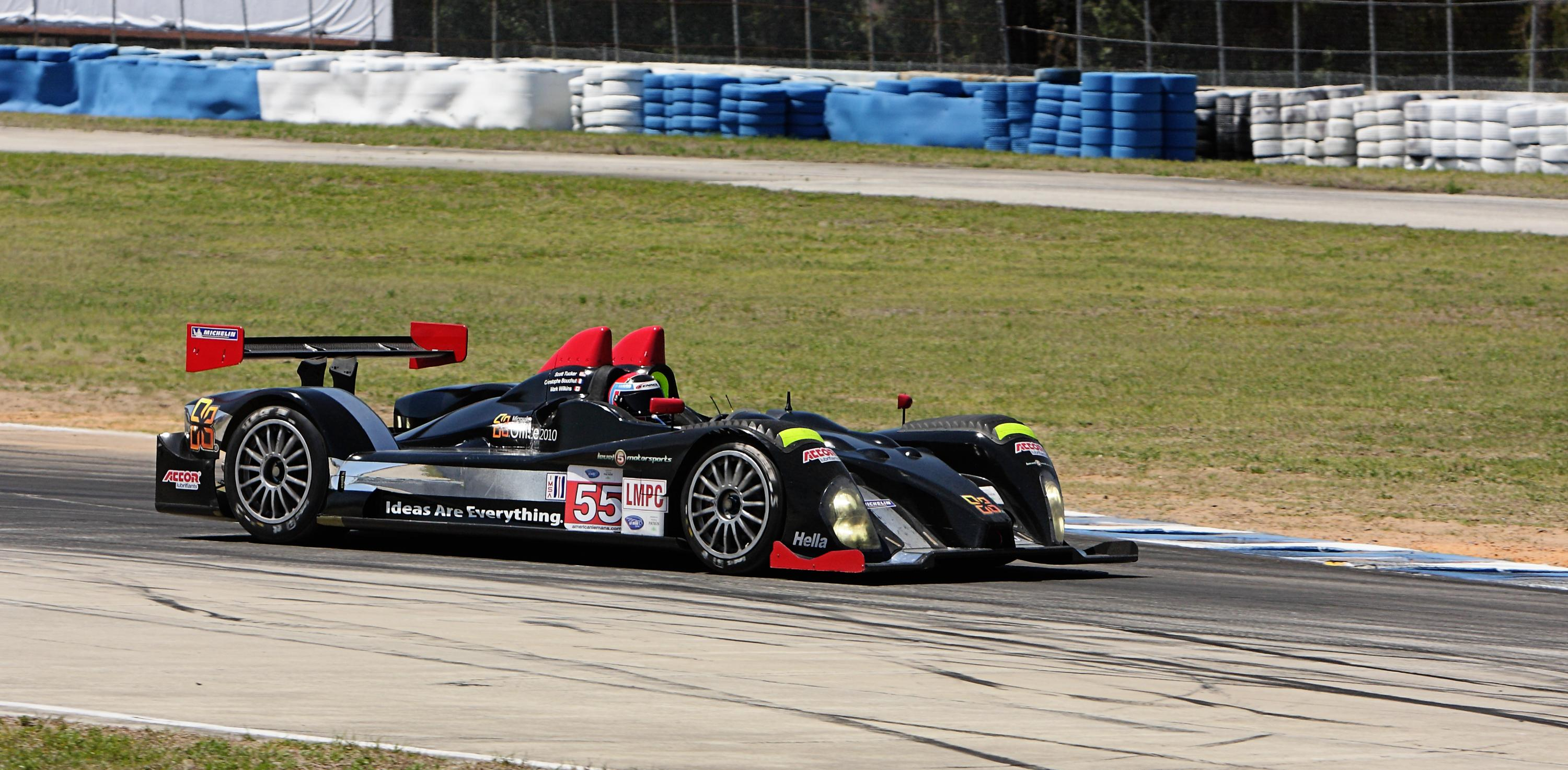
Level 5 Motorsports Oreca FLM09 at the 2010 12 Hours of Sebring.

Level 5 Motorsports also competed in the full 2010 season of the American Le Mans Series. Starting with a class win at the 12 hours of Sebring, Level 5 Motorsports won 5 of 9 races. The team won the LMPC Championship and team owner, Scott Tucker, won the Drivers Championship.

For 2011, Level 5 Motorsports only competed in select rounds of the American Le Mans Series season. The team used an HPD powered Lola B08/80 and a Lola B11/40 to gain victories at the Sebring, Long Beach and Road America. The team used two HPD ARX-01gs to gain victories in the final two races of the season at Petit Le Mans and Laguna Seca. Having won every race they entered, Level 5 Motorsports won the LMP2 team championship and drivers Scott Tucker and Christophe Bouchut won the LMP2 Drivers Championship.

The 2012 season saw Level 5 Motorsports campaign two brand new HPD ARX-03b's for the full season. The #055 car, driven by Scott Tucker, João Barbosa, Christophe Bouchut, took first in class at the Mobil 1 12 Hours of Sebring. The team went on to win 7 of the next 9 races, losing only at Mosport and Road America to their main rivals, Conquest Endurance. The Level 5 Motorsports crew was able to secure the LMP2 Team Championship. Scott Tucker and Christophe Bouchut also claimed the LMP2 Drivers championship.

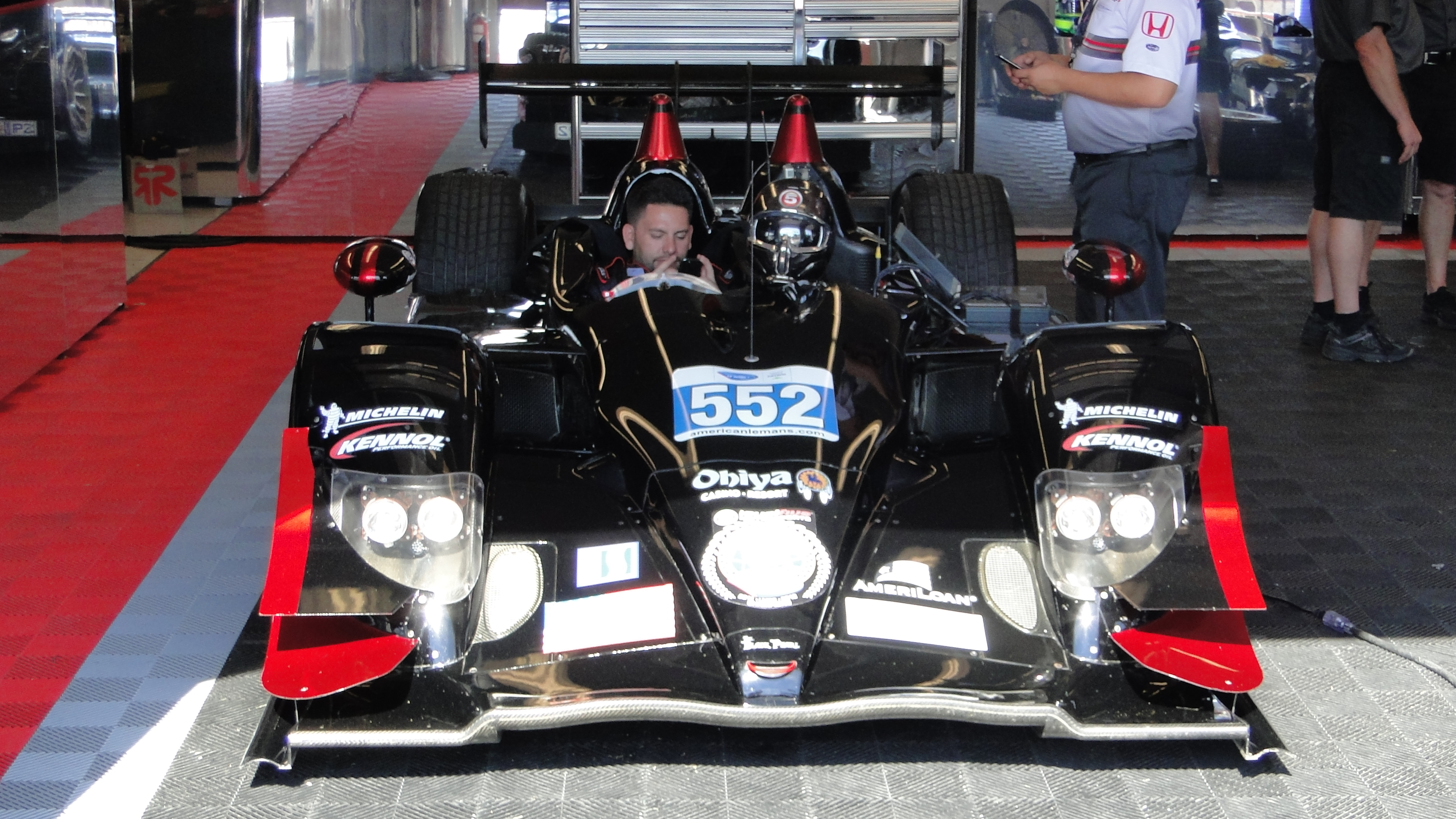
HPD ARX-03b #552 of Level 5 Motorsports at Virginia International Raceway during the 2013 Oak Tree Grand Prix.

In 2013, Level 5 Motorsports earned nine class wins out of 10 races with its two HPD ARX-03b's. The team was able to secure its fourth consecutive American Le Mans Series team championship and third straight in the P2 class. Scott Tucker won his fourth American Le Mans Series drivers' 'title.

== United SportsCar Championship ==
Level 5 Motorsports won the 2014 24 Hours of Daytona in the GT Daytona class with its No. 555 Ferrari 458 Italia GT3 of Scott Tucker, Townsend Bell, Bill Sweedler, Jeff Segal and Alessandro Pier Guidi, despite the car having initially been handed a penalty for late-race avoidable contact. IMSA reversed the call more than four hours after the race, declaring the No. 555 car the winners in GTD. The win marked Ferrari's 10th in the Rolex 24 at Daytona and the first since the Italian manufacturer's overall victory in 1998 with a Ferrari 333SP fielded by Doran-Moretti Racing. On February 26, Level 5 announced that it will withdraw from the series.

== 24 Hours of Le Mans ==
In 2011, the Level 5 Motorsports team also competed in 5 of the 7 rounds of the Intercontinental Le Mans Cup including the 24 Hours of Le Mans. The team qualified their #33 Microsoft Office 2010-sponsored Lola 11th in class. Drivers Scott Tucker, Christophe Bouchut and João Barbosa completed 319 laps, finishing 3rd in LMP2 in their first attempt at the famed race.

The team also competed in 2012 24 Hours of Le Mans. The team qualified the #33 car 14th in class. Scott Tucker, Christophe Bouchut and Luis Díaz completed 240 laps but did not finish the race. This was the team's second appearance at Le Mans.

In 2013, the #33 Level 5 Motorsports HPD ARX-03b of Scott Tucker, Ryan Briscoe and Marino Franchitti completed 242 laps after battling engine-related issues. The car was not classified in the final results due to not reaching the minimum 70 percent distance requirement.

== Racing record ==
=== 24 Hours of Le Mans results ===
Year	Entrant	No.	Car	Drivers	Class	Laps	Pos.	Class Pos.
2010	(Germany) Kolles	14	Audi R10 TDI	(France) Christophe Bouchut (Portugal) Manuel Rodrigues (United States) Scott Tucker	LMP1	182	DNF	DNF
2011	(United States) Level 5 Motorsports	33	Lola B08/80-HPD	(Portugal) João Barbosa (France) Christophe Bouchut (United States) Scott Tucker	LMP2	319	10th	3rd
2012	(United States) Level 5 Motorsports	33	HPD ARX-03b-Honda	(France) Christophe Bouchut (Mexico) Luis Díaz (United States) Scott Tucker	LMP2	240	DNF	DNF
2013	(United States) Level 5 Motorsports	33	HPD ARX-03b-Honda	(Australia) Ryan Briscoe (United Kingdom) Marino Franchitti (United States) Scott Tucker	LMP2	242	NC	NC
