= 2001 American Le Mans Series =

31st season of the racing series organized by IMSA

Seasons
- ← 2000 2002 →

The 2001 American Le Mans Series season was the third season for the IMSA American Le Mans Series, and the 31st overall season of the IMSA GT Championship. It was a series for Le Mans Prototypes (LMP) and Grand Touring (GT) race cars divided into 4 classes: LMP900, LMP675, GTS, and GT. It began March 4, 2001 and ended October 6, 2001 after 10 races.

This season shared events with the new European Le Mans Series, with two events being held in Europe.

== Schedule ==
Rd.	Race	Length	Circuit	Location	Date
1	(United States) Grand Prix of Texas	2 Hours 45 Minutes	Texas Motor Speedway	Fort Worth, Texas	March 4
2	(United States) 12 Hours of Sebring^{†}	12 hours	Sebring International Raceway	Sebring, Florida	March 17
3	(United Kingdom) ELMS Race at Donington Park^{†}	2 Hours 45 Minutes	Donington Park	Castle Donington, Leicestershire	April 14
4	(Spain) ELMS Race at Jarama^{†}	2 Hours 45 Minutes	Circuito Permanente Del Jarama	San Sebastián de los Reyes	May 20
5	(United States) Grand Prix of Sonoma	2 Hours 45 Minutes	Sears Point Raceway	Sonoma, California	July 22
6	(United States) Grand Prix of Portland	2 Hours 45 Minutes	Portland International Raceway	Portland, Oregon	August 5
7	(Canada) Grand Prix of Mosport	2 Hours 45 Minutes	Mosport	Bowmanville, Ontario	August 19
8	(United States) Grand Prix of Mid-Ohio	2 Hours 45 Minutes	Mid-Ohio	Lexington, Ohio	August 25
9	(United States) Monterey Sports Car Championships	2 Hours 45 Minutes	Mazda Raceway Laguna Seca	Monterey, California	September 9
10	(United States) Petit Le Mans^{†}	1000 Miles or 10 Hours	Road Atlanta	Braselton, Georgia	October 6

† - Joint event with ELMS.

The following rounds were included on the original calendar but were later cancelled.

Race	Length	Circuit	Location	Date	Cancellation reason
(Canada) Mont-Tremblant	2 Hours 45 Minutes	Circuit Mont-Tremblant	Mont-Tremblant, Quebec	August 25	Contractual issues
(United States) Grand Prix of Charlotte	2 Hours 45 Minutes	Lowe's Motor Speedway	Concord, North Carolina	October 21	Series lost interest
(Malaysia) Le Mans Series Race of Champions	4/6 hours	Sepang International Circuit	Sepang, Selangor	November 11	Logistical issues
(Australia) Adelaide	6 hours	Adelaide Street Circuit	Adelaide, South Australia	December 2	Government withdrawal

=== Schedule changes ===
The ALMS initially announced a 13 race schedule for the 2001 season in September 2000. For the only time in ALMS history, the season opener was not held at Sebring International Raceway but instead being preceded by the Grand Prix of Texas. After Sebring, two European races were held in collaboration with the ELMS and were optional for ALMS teams as the next North American event was not until after Le Mans. The British round was held at Donington Park after Silverstone and Brands Hatch's plans fell through due to scheduling issues. The second European round would be held at Circuito Permanente Del Jarama in Spain.

A second Canadian round was planned to be held at Circuit Mont-Tremblant in Quebec on August 25. This was cancelled after circuit owner Lawrence Stroll communicated to the ALMS “an inability to comply with the terms of the event agreement”. Mid-Ohio Sports Car Course would replace the event, marking the first time the ALMS would visit the Midwest.

Three races were planned after Petit Le Mans but all were cancelled and not replaced. Charlotte Motor Speedway planned to host a race on October 21st but was cancelled in August.

The final two rounds were to be exhibition events for the planned Asia-Pacific Le Mans Series (APLMS) with races at Sepang International Circuit on November 11th and the Adelaide Street Circuit on December 2nd. The South Australian government cancelled the Adelaide event in early 2001 and while the ALMS received offers from several locations around Australia to hold a replacement event, with the most likely candidate being a street circuit in Sydney, however the series ran out of time for a replacement. The Malaysian round was increased from 4 to 6 hours to compensate. This event would also be cancelled after logistical issues caused by the September 11th Terrorist attacks.

the Nürburgring and Las Vegas Motor Speedway were both dropped from the schedule after 2000 with no reason given. This was the last season to feature events held on road courses at oval circuits.

There had also been plans to hold the season opener on the Island of Aruba at the Palo Marga International Raceway but this failed to materialize.

== Entry list ==
=== Le Mans Prototype 900 (LMP900) ===
Team	Chassis	Engine	Tyre	No.	Drivers	Rnds.
(Germany) Audi Sport North America	Audi R8	Audi 3.6 L Turbo V8	M	1	(Italy) Rinaldo Capello	All
(Germany) Audi Sport North America	Audi R8	Audi 3.6 L Turbo V8	M	1	(Denmark) Tom Kristensen	1, 3–10
(Germany) Audi Sport North America	Audi R8	Audi 3.6 L Turbo V8	M	1	(Italy) Michele Alboreto	2
(Germany) Audi Sport North America	Audi R8	Audi 3.6 L Turbo V8	M	1	(France) Laurent Aïello	2
(Germany) Audi Sport North America	Audi R8	Audi 3.6 L Turbo V8	M	2	(Germany) Frank Biela	All
(Germany) Audi Sport North America	Audi R8	Audi 3.6 L Turbo V8	M	2	(Italy) Emanuele Pirro	All
(Germany) Audi Sport North America	Audi R8	Audi 3.6 L Turbo V8	M	2	(Denmark) Tom Kristensen	2
(United Kingdom) Team Ascari	Ascari A410	Judd GV4 4.0 L V10	G	3	(South Africa) Werner Lupberger	3
(United Kingdom) Team Ascari	Ascari A410	Judd GV4 4.0 L V10	G	3	(United Kingdom) Ben Collins	3
(United Kingdom) Team Ascari	Ascari A410	Judd GV4 4.0 L V10	G	4	(France) Patrick Lemarié	3
(United Kingdom) Team Ascari	Ascari A410	Judd GV4 4.0 L V10	G	4	(Netherlands) Klaas Zwart	3
(United Kingdom) Team Ascari	Ascari A410	Judd GV4 4.0 L V10	G	4	(Finland) Harri Toivonen	3
(France) Team PlayStation	Chrysler LMP	Mopar 6.0L V8	M	6	(Monaco) Olivier Beretta	3, 10*
(France) Team PlayStation	Chrysler LMP	Mopar 6.0L V8	M	6	(France) Yannick Dalmas	3, 10*
(France) Team PlayStation	Chrysler LMP	Mopar 6.0L V8	M	6	(Portugal) Pedro Lamy	10*
(United Kingdom) Johansson Motorsport	Audi R8	Audi 3.6 L Turbo V8	M	7 18	(Sweden) Stefan Johansson	2–4, 9–10
(United Kingdom) Johansson Motorsport	Audi R8	Audi 3.6 L Turbo V8	M	7 18	(United Kingdom) Guy Smith	2–4
(United Kingdom) Johansson Motorsport	Audi R8	Audi 3.6 L Turbo V8	M	7 18	(France) Patrick Lemarié	9–10
(United States) Team Cadillac	Cadillac Northstar LMP01	Cadillac Northstar 4.0 L Turbo V8	M	7	(France) Emmanuel Collard	5, 7–10
(United States) Team Cadillac	Cadillac Northstar LMP01	Cadillac Northstar 4.0 L Turbo V8	M	7	(France) Christophe Tinseau	5, 7–9
(United States) Team Cadillac	Cadillac Northstar LMP01	Cadillac Northstar 4.0 L Turbo V8	M	7	(Belgium) Marc Goossens	10
(United States) Team Cadillac	Cadillac Northstar LMP01	Cadillac Northstar 4.0 L Turbo V8	M	7	(France) Éric Bernard	10*
(United States) Team Cadillac	Cadillac Northstar LMP01	Cadillac Northstar 4.0 L Turbo V8	M	8	(Italy) Max Angelelli	5, 7–10
(United States) Team Cadillac	Cadillac Northstar LMP01	Cadillac Northstar 4.0 L Turbo V8	M	8	(South Africa) Wayne Taylor	5, 7–10
(United States) Team Cadillac	Cadillac Northstar LMP01	Cadillac Northstar 4.0 L Turbo V8	M	8	(France) Christophe Tinseau	10
(United States) Philip Creighton Motorsport Ltd.	Lola B2K/10	Ford (Roush) 6.0 L V8	G	8	(United States) Scott Schubot	1*
(United States) Philip Creighton Motorsport Ltd.	Lola B2K/10	Ford (Roush) 6.0 L V8	G	8	(United States) Rick Sutherland	1*
(United Kingdom) Westward Racing	Panoz LMP-1 Roadster-S	Élan 6L8 6.0L V8	A	8	(United States) Jay Cochran	3
(United Kingdom) Westward Racing	Panoz LMP-1 Roadster-S	Élan 6L8 6.0L V8	A	8	(United States) Peter Boss	3
(United States) Dyson Racing Team	Riley & Scott Mk III C	Lincoln (Élan) 6.0L V8	G	16	(United States) Butch Leitzinger	2, 7–10
(United States) Dyson Racing Team	Riley & Scott Mk III C	Lincoln (Élan) 6.0L V8	G	16	(United Kingdom) James Weaver	2, 7–10
(United States) Dyson Racing Team	Riley & Scott Mk III C	Lincoln (Élan) 6.0L V8	G	16	(United States) Elliot Forbes-Robinson	2, 10
(United States) Intersport Racing	Lola B2K/10	Judd GV4 4.0 L V10	G	36	(United States) Earl Goddard	10
(United States) Intersport Racing	Lola B2K/10	Judd GV4 4.0 L V10	G	36	(United States) Duncan Dayton	10
(United States) Intersport Racing	Lola B2K/10 (Rd. 2, 5–6) Lola B2K/10B (Rd. 8–10)	Judd GV4 4.0 L V10	G	37	(United States) Jon Field	2, 5–6, 8–10
(United States) Intersport Racing	Lola B2K/10 (Rd. 2, 5–6) Lola B2K/10B (Rd. 8–10)	Judd GV4 4.0 L V10	G	37	(United States) Rick Sutherland	2, 5–6, 9–10
(United States) Intersport Racing	Lola B2K/10 (Rd. 2, 5–6) Lola B2K/10B (Rd. 8–10)	Judd GV4 4.0 L V10	G	37	(United States) Duncan Dayton	2
(United States) Intersport Racing	Lola B2K/10 (Rd. 2, 5–6) Lola B2K/10B (Rd. 8–10)	Judd GV4 4.0 L V10	G	37	(United States) Joel Field	8
(United States) Intersport Racing	Lola B2K/10 (Rd. 2, 5–6) Lola B2K/10B (Rd. 8–10)	Judd GV4 4.0 L V10	G	37	(United States) Clint Field	8
(United States) Intersport Racing	Lola B2K/10 (Rd. 2, 5–6) Lola B2K/10B (Rd. 8–10)	Judd GV4 4.0 L V10	G	37	(United States) Mark Neuhaus	10
(United States) Champion Racing	Audi R8	Audi 3.6 L Turbo V8	M	38	(United Kingdom) Andy Wallace	1–2, 5–10
(United States) Champion Racing	Audi R8	Audi 3.6 L Turbo V8	M	38	(United States) Dorsey Schroeder	1–2
(United States) Champion Racing	Audi R8	Audi 3.6 L Turbo V8	M	38	(Germany) Ralf Kelleners	2
(United States) Champion Racing	Audi R8	Audi 3.6 L Turbo V8	M	38	(United Kingdom) Johnny Herbert	5–10
(United States) Panoz Motor Sports	Panoz LMP-1 Roadster-S	Élan 6L8 6.0L V8	M	49	(United States) Jay Cochran	1
(United States) Panoz Motor Sports	Panoz LMP-1 Roadster-S	Élan 6L8 6.0L V8	M	49	(United Kingdom) Richard Dean	1
(United States) Panoz Motor Sports	Panoz LMP07 (Rd. 1–4) Panoz LMP-1 Roadster-S (Rd. 5–10)	Élan (Zytek) 4.0L V8 (Rd. 1–4) Élan 6L8 6.0L V8 (Rd. 5–10)	M	50	(Denmark) Jan Magnussen	All
(United States) Panoz Motor Sports	Panoz LMP07 (Rd. 1–4) Panoz LMP-1 Roadster-S (Rd. 5–10)	Élan (Zytek) 4.0L V8 (Rd. 1–4) Élan 6L8 6.0L V8 (Rd. 5–10)	M	50	(Australia) David Brabham	All
(United States) Panoz Motor Sports	Panoz LMP-1 Roadster-S (Rd. 1, 5–10) Panoz LMP07 (Rd. 2–4)	Élan 6L8 6.0L V8 (Rd. 1–11) Élan (Zytek) 4.0L V8 (Rd. 12)	M	51	(Germany) Klaus Graf	All
(United States) Panoz Motor Sports	Panoz LMP-1 Roadster-S (Rd. 1, 5–10) Panoz LMP07 (Rd. 2–4)	Élan 6L8 6.0L V8 (Rd. 1–11) Élan (Zytek) 4.0L V8 (Rd. 12)	M	51	(Brazil) Gaulter Salles	1–3
(United States) Panoz Motor Sports	Panoz LMP-1 Roadster-S (Rd. 1, 5–10) Panoz LMP07 (Rd. 2–4)	Élan 6L8 6.0L V8 (Rd. 1–11) Élan (Zytek) 4.0L V8 (Rd. 12)	M	51	(France) Franck Lagorce	4–10
(France) Pescarolo Sport	Courage C60	Peugeot A32 3.2L Turbo V6	M	72	(France) Jean-Christophe Boullion	2–3
(France) Pescarolo Sport	Courage C60	Peugeot A32 3.2L Turbo V6	M	72	(France) Laurent Redon	2–3
(France) Pescarolo Sport	Courage C60	Peugeot A32 3.2L Turbo V6	M	72	(France) Sébastien Bourdais	2

=== Le Mans Prototype 675 (LMP675) ===
Team	Chassis	Engine	Tyre	No.	Drivers	Rnds.
(United States) Dick Barbour Racing	Reynard 01Q	Judd GV675 3.4L V8	G	5	(Belgium) Didier de Radigues	3–4, 7–10
(United States) Dick Barbour Racing	Reynard 01Q	Judd GV675 3.4L V8	G	5	(Belgium) Eric van de Poele	3–4
(United States) Dick Barbour Racing	Reynard 01Q	Judd GV675 3.4L V8	G	5	(Belgium) Bruno Lambert	7–8, 10
(United States) Dick Barbour Racing	Reynard 01Q	Judd GV675 3.4L V8	G	5	(Venezuela) Milka Duno	9
(United States) Dick Barbour Racing	Reynard 01Q	Judd GV675 3.4L V8	G	5	(South Africa) Earl Goddard	10
(United States) Dick Barbour Racing	Reynard 01Q	Judd GV675 3.4L V8	G	57	(Canada) John Graham	3–10
(United States) Dick Barbour Racing	Reynard 01Q	Judd GV675 3.4L V8	G	57	(Venezuela) Milka Duno	3–8, 10
(United States) Dick Barbour Racing	Reynard 01Q	Judd GV675 3.4L V8	G	57	(Belgium) Didier de Radigues	5–6
(United States) Dick Barbour Racing	Reynard 01Q	Judd GV675 3.4L V8	G	57	(Canada) Scott Maxwell	9–10
(United States) Roock-KnightHawk Racing	Lola B2K/40	Nissan (AER) VQL 3.0L V6	A	13	(United States) Mel Hawkins	1–2, 4, 9–10
(United States) Roock-KnightHawk Racing	Lola B2K/40	Nissan (AER) VQL 3.0L V6	A	13	(United States) Steven Knight	1–2, 7–10
(United States) Roock-KnightHawk Racing	Lola B2K/40	Nissan (AER) VQL 3.0L V6	A	13	(Germany) Claudia Hürtgen	2, 7–10
(United States) Roock-KnightHawk Racing	Lola B2K/40	Nissan (AER) VQL 3.0L V6	A	13	(South Africa) Earl Goddard	4
(United States) Roock-KnightHawk Racing	Lola B2K/40	Nissan (AER) VQL 3.0L V6	A	13	(Spain) Tomás Saldaña	4
(United Kingdom) Rowan Racing	Pilbeam MP84	Nissan (AER) VQL 3.0L V6	A	21	(United Kingdom) Martin O'Connell	3–4
(United Kingdom) Rowan Racing	Pilbeam MP84	Nissan (AER) VQL 3.0L V6	A	21	(United Kingdom) Warren Carway	3–4
(United States) Archangel Motorsports	Lola B2K/40	Nissan (AER) VQL 3.0L V6	A	21	(United Kingdom) Ben Devlin	10
(United States) Archangel Motorsports	Lola B2K/40	Nissan (AER) VQL 3.0L V6	A	21	(United States) Andrew Davis	10
(United States) Archangel Motorsports	Lola B2K/40	Nissan (AER) VQL 3.0L V6	A	21	(United States) Jason Workman	10
(Kenya) Swara Racing	Pilbeam MP84	Nissan (AER) VQL 3.0L V6	A	24	(United Kingdom) Robert Schirle	3*
(Kenya) Swara Racing	Pilbeam MP84	Nissan (AER) VQL 3.0L V6	A	24	(United States) Stephen Earle	3*
(Kenya) Swara Racing	Pilbeam MP84	Nissan (AER) VQL 3.0L V6	A	24	(United Kingdom) Ben McLoughlin	3*
(Kenya) Swara Racing	Pilbeam MP84	Nissan (AER) VQL 3.0L V6	A	24	(United Kingdom) Simon Wiseman	4*
(Kenya) Swara Racing	Pilbeam MP84	Nissan (AER) VQL 3.0L V6	A	24	(United Kingdom) Michael Mallock	4*
(United States) Team Bucknum Racing	Pilbeam MP84	Nissan (AER) VQL 3.0L V6	A	31	(United States) Chris McMurry	10
(United States) Team Bucknum Racing	Pilbeam MP84	Nissan (AER) VQL 3.0L V6	A	31	(United States) Bret Arsenault	10
(United States) Team Bucknum Racing	Pilbeam MP84	Nissan (AER) VQL 3.0L V6	A	31	(United States) Bryan Willman	10
(France) Racing Organisation Course	Reynard 2KQ-LM	Volkswagen 2.0L Turbo I4	M	39	(Spain) Jordi Gené	10
(France) Racing Organisation Course	Reynard 2KQ-LM	Volkswagen 2.0L Turbo I4	M	39	(France) Yannick Schroeder	10
(France) Racing Organisation Course	Reynard 2KQ-LM	Volkswagen 2.0L Turbo I4	M	39	(Switzerland) Jean-Denis Délétraz	10
(United States) Southern Comfort Racing	Pilbeam MP84	Nissan (AER) VQL 3.0L V6	A	48	(United States) Jimmy Adams	8
(United States) Southern Comfort Racing	Pilbeam MP84	Nissan (AER) VQL 3.0L V6	A	48	(United States) Joe Blacker	8
(United States) Team Spencer Motorsports	Lola B2K/40	Mazda 1.3 L Turbo 2-Rotor	G	62	(United States) Dennis Spencer	10*
(United States) Team Spencer Motorsports	Lola B2K/40	Mazda 1.3 L Turbo 2-Rotor	G	62	(United States) Rich Grupp	10*
(United States) Gunnar Racing	Lola B2K/40	Porsche F6 2.0L Turbo	D	77	(United States) Wayne Jackson	2*
(United States) Gunnar Racing	Lola B2K/40	Porsche F6 2.0L Turbo	D	77	(United States) Gunnar Jeannette	2*
(United States) Gunnar Racing	Lola B2K/40	Porsche F6 2.0L Turbo	D	77	(Canada) Bill Adam	2*

=== Grand Touring Sport (GTS) ===
Team	Chassis	Engine	Tyre	No.	Drivers	Rnds.
(United States) Park Place Racing (United States) Fordahl Motorsports	Saleen S7-R	Ford 7.0L V8	Y	05	(United States) Chris Bingham	10
(United States) Park Place Racing (United States) Fordahl Motorsports	Saleen S7-R	Ford 7.0L V8	Y	05	(United Kingdom) Oliver Gavin	10
(United States) Park Place Racing (United States) Fordahl Motorsports	Saleen S7-R	Ford 7.0L V8	Y	05	(United States) Ron Johnson	10
(United States) Corvette Racing	Chevrolet Corvette C5-R	Chevrolet 7.0 L V8	G	3	(United States) Johnny O'Connell	1–2, 5–10
(United States) Corvette Racing	Chevrolet Corvette C5-R	Chevrolet 7.0 L V8	G	3	(Canada) Ron Fellows	1–2, 5–10
(United States) Corvette Racing	Chevrolet Corvette C5-R	Chevrolet 7.0 L V8	G	3	(United States) Chris Kneifel	2
(United States) Corvette Racing	Chevrolet Corvette C5-R	Chevrolet 7.0 L V8	G	3	(France) Franck Fréon	10
(United States) Corvette Racing	Chevrolet Corvette C5-R	Chevrolet 7.0 L V8	G	4	(United States) Andy Pilgrim	1–2, 5–10
(United States) Corvette Racing	Chevrolet Corvette C5-R	Chevrolet 7.0 L V8	G	4	(United States) Kelly Collins	1–2, 5–10
(United States) Corvette Racing	Chevrolet Corvette C5-R	Chevrolet 7.0 L V8	G	4	(France) Franck Fréon	2
(United States) Corvette Racing	Chevrolet Corvette C5-R	Chevrolet 7.0 L V8	G	4	(United States) Scott Pruett	10
(United Kingdom) Brookspeed	Dodge Viper GTS-R	Dodge 8.0L V10	D	19	(Germany) Dino Steiner	10
(United Kingdom) Brookspeed	Dodge Viper GTS-R	Dodge 8.0L V10	D	19	(United States) Joe Ellis	10
(United Kingdom) Brookspeed	Dodge Viper GTS-R	Dodge 8.0L V10	D	19	(United States) John Cooper	10
(Germany) Konrad Motorsport	Saleen S7-R	Ford 7.0L V8	D	25	(Switzerland) Walter Brun	10
(Germany) Konrad Motorsport	Saleen S7-R	Ford 7.0L V8	D	25	(Switzerland) Toni Seiler	10
(Germany) Konrad Team Saleen	Saleen S7-R	Ford 7.0L V8	G D	26	(Austria) Franz Konrad	2–10
(Germany) Konrad Team Saleen	Saleen S7-R	Ford 7.0L V8	G D	26	(United Kingdom) Oliver Gavin	2–3
(Germany) Konrad Team Saleen	Saleen S7-R	Ford 7.0L V8	G D	26	(United States) Terry Borcheller	2, 5–10
(Germany) Konrad Team Saleen	Saleen S7-R	Ford 7.0L V8	G D	26	(Switzerland) Walter Brun	4
(Germany) Konrad Team Saleen	Saleen S7-R	Ford 7.0L V8	G D	26	(Switzerland) Toni Seiler	4
(Germany) Konrad Team Saleen	Saleen S7-R	Ford 7.0L V8	G D	26	(United States) Charles Slater	10
(Germany) Konrad Motorsport	Porsche 911 GT2	Porsche 3.8 L Turbo Flat-6	G	44	(Portugal) Bernardo Sá Nogueira	4
(Germany) Konrad Motorsport	Porsche 911 GT2	Porsche 3.8 L Turbo Flat-6	G	44	(Poland) Maciej Stanco	4
(United Kingdom) RML	Saleen S7-R	Ford 7.0L V8	D	41	(United Kingdom) Ian McKellar	3–4
(United Kingdom) RML	Saleen S7-R	Ford 7.0L V8	D	41	(Belgium) Bruno Lambert	3–4
(United States) American Viperacing	Dodge Viper GTS-R	Dodge 8.0L V10	D	44	(United States) Tom Weickardt	1–2, 5–10
(United States) American Viperacing	Dodge Viper GTS-R	Dodge 8.0L V10	D	44	(United States) Joe Ellis	1–2, 8
(United States) American Viperacing	Dodge Viper GTS-R	Dodge 8.0L V10	D	44	(United Kingdom) Andy Pardoe	2
(United States) American Viperacing	Dodge Viper GTS-R	Dodge 8.0L V10	D	44	(United States) Gene Martindale	5
(United States) American Viperacing	Dodge Viper GTS-R	Dodge 8.0L V10	D	44	(United States) Kevin Allen	6–7, 10
(United States) American Viperacing	Dodge Viper GTS-R	Dodge 8.0L V10	D	44	(United States) Mike Silcox	9
(United States) American Viperacing	Dodge Viper GTS-R	Dodge 8.0L V10	D	44	(United States) Rick Fairbanks	10
(United States) American Viperacing	Dodge Viper GTS-R	Dodge 8.0L V10	D	45	(United States) Erik Messley	1–2
(United States) American Viperacing	Dodge Viper GTS-R	Dodge 8.0L V10	D	45	(United States) Terry Borcheller	1
(United States) American Viperacing	Dodge Viper GTS-R	Dodge 8.0L V10	D	45	(United States) Jeff Altenburg	2, 5–6
(United States) American Viperacing	Dodge Viper GTS-R	Dodge 8.0L V10	D	45	(United States) Stu Hayner	2
(United States) American Viperacing	Dodge Viper GTS-R	Dodge 8.0L V10	D	45	(United States) Shane Lewis	5–9
(United States) American Viperacing	Dodge Viper GTS-R	Dodge 8.0L V10	D	45	(United States) David Donohue	7–8
(United States) American Viperacing	Dodge Viper GTS-R	Dodge 8.0L V10	D	45	(United States) Darren Law	9
(United States) American Viperacing	Dodge Viper GTS-R	Dodge 8.0L V10	D	45	(Netherlands) Mike Hezemans	10
(United States) American Viperacing	Dodge Viper GTS-R	Dodge 8.0L V10	D	45	(Belgium) Anthony Kumpen	10
(United Kingdom) Prodrive Allstars	Ferrari 550-GTS Maranello	Ferrari 5.9L V12	M	88	(Netherlands) Peter Kox	10
(United Kingdom) Prodrive Allstars	Ferrari 550-GTS Maranello	Ferrari 5.9L V12	M	88	(Sweden) Rickard Rydell	10
(United Kingdom) Prodrive Allstars	Ferrari 550-GTS Maranello	Ferrari 5.9L V12	M	88	(Belgium) Marc Duez	10

=== Grand Touring (GT) ===
Team	Chassis	Engine	Tyre	No.	Drivers	Rnds.
(France) Larbre Compétition	Porsche 996 GT3-RS	Porsche 3.6 L Flat-6	M	00	(France) Christophe Bouchut	2
(France) Larbre Compétition	Porsche 996 GT3-RS	Porsche 3.6 L Flat-6	M	00	(France) Patrice Goueslard	2
(France) Larbre Compétition	Porsche 996 GT3-RS	Porsche 3.6 L Flat-6	M	00	(France) Sébastien Dumez	2
(Germany) RWS Motorsport	Porsche 996 GT3-R	Porsche 3.6 L Flat-6	D	07	(Germany) Norman Simon	2
(Germany) RWS Motorsport	Porsche 996 GT3-R	Porsche 3.6 L Flat-6	D	07	(Austria) Dieter Quester	2
(Germany) RWS Motorsport	Porsche 996 GT3-R	Porsche 3.6 L Flat-6	D	07	(Austria) Philipp Peter	2
(United States) Cirtek Motorsport	Porsche 996 GT3-RS	Porsche 3.6 L Flat-6	D	09	(United States) Keith Alexander	2
(United States) Cirtek Motorsport	Porsche 996 GT3-RS	Porsche 3.6 L Flat-6	D	09	(United Kingdom) Gavin Pickering	2
(United States) Cirtek Motorsport	Porsche 996 GT3-RS	Porsche 3.6 L Flat-6	D	09	(United States) Chris Gleason	2
(United States) BMW Team PTG	BMW M3 E46 (Rd. 1–2) BMW M3 E46 GTR (Rd. 5–10)	BMW 3.2 L I6 (Rd. 1–2) BMW 4.0L V8 (Rd. 5–10)	Y	6	(Germany) Hans-Joachim Stuck	1–2, 5–10
(United States) BMW Team PTG	BMW M3 E46 (Rd. 1–2) BMW M3 E46 GTR (Rd. 5–10)	BMW 3.2 L I6 (Rd. 1–2) BMW 4.0L V8 (Rd. 5–10)	Y	6	(United States) Boris Said	1–2, 5–8, 10
(United States) BMW Team PTG	BMW M3 E46 (Rd. 1–2) BMW M3 E46 GTR (Rd. 5–10)	BMW 3.2 L I6 (Rd. 1–2) BMW 4.0L V8 (Rd. 5–10)	Y	6	(United States) Peter Cunningham	2
(United States) BMW Team PTG	BMW M3 E46 (Rd. 1–2) BMW M3 E46 GTR (Rd. 5–10)	BMW 3.2 L I6 (Rd. 1–2) BMW 4.0L V8 (Rd. 5–10)	Y	6	(Sweden) Niclas Jönsson	9
(United States) BMW Team PTG	BMW M3 E46 (Rd. 1–2) BMW M3 E46 GTR (Rd. 5–10)	BMW 3.2 L I6 (Rd. 1–2) BMW 4.0L V8 (Rd. 5–10)	Y	6	(United States) Bill Auberlen	10
(United States) BMW Team PTG	BMW M3 E46	BMW 3.2 L I6	Y	9	(United States) Bill Auberlen	10*
(United States) BMW Team PTG	BMW M3 E46	BMW 3.2 L I6	Y	9	(United States) Boris Said	10*
(United States) BMW Team PTG	BMW M3 E46 (Rd. 1–2) BMW M3 E46 GTR (Rd. 5–10)	BMW 3.2 L I6 (Rd. 1–2) BMW 4.0L V8 (Rd. 5–10)	Y	10	(Sweden) Niclas Jönsson	1–2, 5–8, 10
(United States) BMW Team PTG	BMW M3 E46 (Rd. 1–2) BMW M3 E46 GTR (Rd. 5–10)	BMW 3.2 L I6 (Rd. 1–2) BMW 4.0L V8 (Rd. 5–10)	Y	10	(United States) Bill Auberlen	1–2, 5–7, 9
(United States) BMW Team PTG	BMW M3 E46 (Rd. 1–2) BMW M3 E46 GTR (Rd. 5–10)	BMW 3.2 L I6 (Rd. 1–2) BMW 4.0L V8 (Rd. 5–10)	Y	10	(United States) Joey Hand	2
(United States) BMW Team PTG	BMW M3 E46 (Rd. 1–2) BMW M3 E46 GTR (Rd. 5–10)	BMW 3.2 L I6 (Rd. 1–2) BMW 4.0L V8 (Rd. 5–10)	Y	10	(United States) Joe Foster	7
(United States) BMW Team PTG	BMW M3 E46 (Rd. 1–2) BMW M3 E46 GTR (Rd. 5–10)	BMW 3.2 L I6 (Rd. 1–2) BMW 4.0L V8 (Rd. 5–10)	Y	10	(United States) Peter Cunningham	8
(United States) BMW Team PTG	BMW M3 E46 (Rd. 1–2) BMW M3 E46 GTR (Rd. 5–10)	BMW 3.2 L I6 (Rd. 1–2) BMW 4.0L V8 (Rd. 5–10)	Y	10	(United States) Boris Said	9
(United States) BMW Team PTG	BMW M3 E46 (Rd. 1–2) BMW M3 E46 GTR (Rd. 5–10)	BMW 3.2 L I6 (Rd. 1–2) BMW 4.0L V8 (Rd. 5–10)	Y	10	(United States) David Murry	10
(United States) BMW Team PTG	BMW M3 E46 (Rd. 1–2) BMW M3 E46 GTR (Rd. 5–10)	BMW 3.2 L I6 (Rd. 1–2) BMW 4.0L V8 (Rd. 5–10)	Y	10	(United States) Brian Cunningham	10
(United States) Aspen Knolls/MCR	Callaway C12-R	Chevrolet 7.0L V8	G	12	(United States) Shane Lewis	1–2, 5*, 7*, 10
(United States) Aspen Knolls/MCR	Callaway C12-R	Chevrolet 7.0L V8	G	12	(United States) Vic Rice	1–2, 5*
(United States) Aspen Knolls/MCR	Callaway C12-R	Chevrolet 7.0L V8	G	12	(United States) Bob Mazzuoccola	2, 7*, 10
(United States) Aspen Knolls/MCR	Callaway C12-R	Chevrolet 7.0L V8	G	12	(United States) Cort Wagner	7*, 10
(United States) Dick Barbour Racing	Porsche 996 GT3-R	Porsche 3.6 L Flat-6	D	15	(Mexico) Randy Wars	2, 5–9
(United States) Dick Barbour Racing	Porsche 996 GT3-R	Porsche 3.6 L Flat-6	D	15	(United States) Grady Willingham	2, 5, 7, 10
(United States) Dick Barbour Racing	Porsche 996 GT3-R	Porsche 3.6 L Flat-6	D	15	(United States) Mark Neuhaus	2, 6, 8–9
(United States) Dick Barbour Racing	Porsche 996 GT3-R	Porsche 3.6 L Flat-6	D	15	(United States) Dave McEntee	5
(United States) Dick Barbour Racing	Porsche 996 GT3-R	Porsche 3.6 L Flat-6	D	15	(United States) Taz Harvey	10
(United States) Dick Barbour Racing	Porsche 996 GT3-R	Porsche 3.6 L Flat-6	D	15	(United Kingdom) Sam Hancock	10
(United States) Trinkler Racing, LLC	Chevrolet Corvette C5	Chevrolet 5.7 L V8	G	17	(United States) Owen Trinkler	1–2
(United States) Trinkler Racing, LLC	Chevrolet Corvette C5	Chevrolet 5.7 L V8	G	17	(United States) Jeff Altenburg	1
(United States) Trinkler Racing, LLC	Chevrolet Corvette C5	Chevrolet 5.7 L V8	G	17	(United States) Andy Lally	2
(United States) Trinkler Racing, LLC	Chevrolet Corvette C5	Chevrolet 5.7 L V8	G	17	(United States) B. J. Zacharias	2
(United States) Alex Job Racing	Porsche 996 GT3-RS	Porsche 3.6 L Flat-6	M	22	(United States) Randy Pobst	All
(United States) Alex Job Racing	Porsche 996 GT3-RS	Porsche 3.6 L Flat-6	M	22	(Germany) Christian Menzel	1–3, 5–10
(United States) Alex Job Racing	Porsche 996 GT3-RS	Porsche 3.6 L Flat-6	M	22	(Germany) Timo Bernhard	2
(United States) Alex Job Racing	Porsche 996 GT3-RS	Porsche 3.6 L Flat-6	M	22	(France) Emmanuel Collard	4
(United States) Alex Job Racing	Porsche 996 GT3-RS	Porsche 3.6 L Flat-6	M	23	(Germany) Lucas Lühr	All
(United States) Alex Job Racing	Porsche 996 GT3-RS	Porsche 3.6 L Flat-6	M	23	(Germany) Sascha Maassen	All
(United States) Alex Job Racing	Porsche 996 GT3-RS	Porsche 3.6 L Flat-6	M	23	(France) Emmanuel Collard	2
(United Kingdom) Sebah	Porsche 996 GT3-R	Porsche 3.6 L Flat-6	A D	29 64	(United Kingdom) Stephen Earle	3–4, 10
(United Kingdom) Sebah	Porsche 996 GT3-R	Porsche 3.6 L Flat-6	A D	29 64	(United Kingdom) Bart Hayden	3–4, 10
(United Kingdom) Sebah	Porsche 996 GT3-R	Porsche 3.6 L Flat-6	A D	29 64	(United Kingdom) Hugh Hayden	10
(United States) Petersen Motorsports	Porsche 996 GT3-R (Rd. 1) Porsche 996 GT3-RS (Rd. 2, 5–10)	Porsche 3.6 L Flat-6	M	30	(United Kingdom) Johnny Mowlem	1–2, 5–10
(United States) Petersen Motorsports	Porsche 996 GT3-R (Rd. 1) Porsche 996 GT3-RS (Rd. 2, 5–10)	Porsche 3.6 L Flat-6	M	30	(France) Bob Wollek	1, 2†
(United States) Petersen Motorsports	Porsche 996 GT3-R (Rd. 1) Porsche 996 GT3-RS (Rd. 2, 5–10)	Porsche 3.6 L Flat-6	M	30	(United States) Michael Petersen	2
(United States) Petersen Motorsports	Porsche 996 GT3-R (Rd. 1) Porsche 996 GT3-RS (Rd. 2, 5–10)	Porsche 3.6 L Flat-6	M	30	(Germany) Timo Bernhard	5–7, 9
(United States) Petersen Motorsports	Porsche 996 GT3-R (Rd. 1) Porsche 996 GT3-RS (Rd. 2, 5–10)	Porsche 3.6 L Flat-6	M	30	(United States) Mike Fitzgerald	8, 10
(United States) Petersen Motorsports	Porsche 996 GT3-R (Rd. 1) Porsche 996 GT3-RS (Rd. 2, 5–10)	Porsche 3.6 L Flat-6	M	30	(France) Jean-Christophe Boullion	10
(United States) Orbit	Porsche 996 GT3-RS	Porsche 3.6 L Flat-6	D	32	(United States) Scooter Gabel	10
(United States) Orbit	Porsche 996 GT3-RS	Porsche 3.6 L Flat-6	D	32	(United States) Gary Schultheis	10
(United States) Orbit	Porsche 996 GT3-RS	Porsche 3.6 L Flat-6	D	32	(United States) Doc Lowman	10
(United States) Orbit	Porsche 996 GT3-RS	Porsche 3.6 L Flat-6	D	34	(United States) Peter Baron	2, 10
(United States) Orbit	Porsche 996 GT3-RS	Porsche 3.6 L Flat-6	D	34	(United States) Leo Hindery	2, 10
(United States) Orbit	Porsche 996 GT3-RS	Porsche 3.6 L Flat-6	D	34	(United States) Gian Luigi Buitoni	2
(United States) Orbit	Porsche 996 GT3-RS	Porsche 3.6 L Flat-6	D	34	(United States) Tony Kester	10
(United States) Orbit	Porsche 996 GT3-RS	Porsche 3.6 L Flat-6	D	35	(Republic of Ireland) Tommy Byrne	2, 10
(United States) Orbit	Porsche 996 GT3-RS	Porsche 3.6 L Flat-6	D	35	(United States) Richard Millman	2, 10
(United States) Orbit	Porsche 996 GT3-RS	Porsche 3.6 L Flat-6	D	35	(United States) Tony Kester	2
(United States) MSB Motorsport	Ferrari 360 Modena GT	Ferrari 3.6L V8	G	33	(United Kingdom) Marino Franchitti	10
(United States) MSB Motorsport	Ferrari 360 Modena GT	Ferrari 3.6L V8	G	33	(United Kingdom) Kelvin Burt	10
(United States) MSB Motorsport	Ferrari 360 Modena GT	Ferrari 3.6L V8	G	33	(Germany) Ralf Kelleners	10
(Germany) Jürgen Alzen Motorsport	Porsche 996 GT3-RS	Porsche 3.6 L Flat-6	Y	36	(Germany) Jürgen Alzen	2
(Germany) Jürgen Alzen Motorsport	Porsche 996 GT3-RS	Porsche 3.6 L Flat-6	Y	36	(Germany) Ulli Richter	2
(Germany) BMW Motorsport (Germany) Team Schnitzer	BMW M3 E46 (Rd. 1) BMW M3 E46 GTR (Rd. 2–10)	BMW 3.2 L I6 (Rd. 1) BMW 4.0L V8 (Rd. 2–10)	M	42	(Finland) J.J. Lehto	All
(Germany) BMW Motorsport (Germany) Team Schnitzer	BMW M3 E46 (Rd. 1) BMW M3 E46 GTR (Rd. 2–10)	BMW 3.2 L I6 (Rd. 1) BMW 4.0L V8 (Rd. 2–10)	M	42	(Germany) Jörg Müller	1–9
(Germany) BMW Motorsport (Germany) Team Schnitzer	BMW M3 E46 (Rd. 1) BMW M3 E46 GTR (Rd. 2–10)	BMW 3.2 L I6 (Rd. 1) BMW 4.0L V8 (Rd. 2–10)	M	42	(Sweden) Fredrik Ekblom	10
(Germany) BMW Motorsport (Germany) Team Schnitzer	BMW M3 E46 (Rd. 1) BMW M3 E46 GTR (Rd. 2–10)	BMW 3.2 L I6 (Rd. 1) BMW 4.0L V8 (Rd. 2–10)	M	42	(Austria) Karl Wendlinger	10
(Germany) BMW Motorsport (Germany) Team Schnitzer	BMW M3 E46 (Rd. 2) BMW M3 E46 GTR (Rd. 3–10)	BMW 3.2 L I6 (Rd. 2) BMW 4.0L V8 (Rd. 3–10)	M	43	(Germany) Dirk Müller	2–10
(Germany) BMW Motorsport (Germany) Team Schnitzer	BMW M3 E46 (Rd. 2) BMW M3 E46 GTR (Rd. 3–10)	BMW 3.2 L I6 (Rd. 2) BMW 4.0L V8 (Rd. 3–10)	M	43	(Sweden) Fredrik Ekblom	2–9
(Germany) BMW Motorsport (Germany) Team Schnitzer	BMW M3 E46 (Rd. 2) BMW M3 E46 GTR (Rd. 3–10)	BMW 3.2 L I6 (Rd. 2) BMW 4.0L V8 (Rd. 3–10)	M	43	(Germany) Jörg Müller	10
(United States) Broadfoot Racing	Porsche 996 GT3-R	Porsche 3.6 L Flat-6	D	47	(United States) John Warner	2, 10
(United States) Broadfoot Racing	Porsche 996 GT3-R	Porsche 3.6 L Flat-6	D	47	(Spain) Paco Orti	2
(United States) Broadfoot Racing	Porsche 996 GT3-R	Porsche 3.6 L Flat-6	D	47	(United States) Allan Ziegelman	2
(United States) Broadfoot Racing	Porsche 996 GT3-R	Porsche 3.6 L Flat-6	D	47	(United States) Doc Lowman	10
(Germany) Seikel Motorsport	Porsche 996 GT3-RS	Porsche 3.6 L Flat-6	Y	52	(Canada) Tony Burgess	1, 3–10
(Germany) Seikel Motorsport	Porsche 996 GT3-RS	Porsche 3.6 L Flat-6	Y	52	(Italy) Stefano Buttiero	1, 10
(Germany) Seikel Motorsport	Porsche 996 GT3-RS	Porsche 3.6 L Flat-6	Y	52	(United States) Philip Collin	2, 5–6, 8
(Germany) Seikel Motorsport	Porsche 996 GT3-RS	Porsche 3.6 L Flat-6	Y	52	(New Zealand) Andrew Bagnall	2, 9
(Germany) Seikel Motorsport	Porsche 996 GT3-RS	Porsche 3.6 L Flat-6	Y	52	(Canada) Brian Burgess	2
(Germany) Seikel Motorsport	Porsche 996 GT3-RS	Porsche 3.6 L Flat-6	Y	52	(United Kingdom) Johnny Mowlem	3
(Germany) Seikel Motorsport	Porsche 996 GT3-RS	Porsche 3.6 L Flat-6	Y	52	(Morocco) Max Cohen-Olivar	4
(Germany) Seikel Motorsport	Porsche 996 GT3-RS	Porsche 3.6 L Flat-6	Y	52	(Sweden) Magnus Wallinder	7
(Germany) Seikel Motorsport	Porsche 996 GT3-RS	Porsche 3.6 L Flat-6	Y	52	(United States) Hugh Plumb	10
(Germany) Seikel Motorsport	Porsche 996 GT3-RS	Porsche 3.6 L Flat-6	Y	53	(Italy) Gabrio Rosa	2–3
(Germany) Seikel Motorsport	Porsche 996 GT3-RS	Porsche 3.6 L Flat-6	Y	53	(Italy) Alex Caffi	2
(Germany) Seikel Motorsport	Porsche 996 GT3-RS	Porsche 3.6 L Flat-6	Y	53	(Italy) Fabio Babini	2
(Germany) Seikel Motorsport	Porsche 996 GT3-RS	Porsche 3.6 L Flat-6	Y	53	(Italy) Luca Drudi	3
(Germany) Freisinger Motorsport	Porsche 996 GT3-R	Porsche 3.6 L Flat-6	Y	57	(United Kingdom) Nigel Smith	2
(Germany) Freisinger Motorsport	Porsche 996 GT3-R	Porsche 3.6 L Flat-6	Y	57	(Germany) Klaus Horn	2
(Germany) Freisinger Motorsport	Porsche 996 GT3-RS	Porsche 3.6 L Flat-6	Y	58	(Germany) Wolfgang Kaufmann	2
(Germany) Freisinger Motorsport	Porsche 996 GT3-RS	Porsche 3.6 L Flat-6	Y	58	(France) Stéphane Ortelli	2
(United Kingdom) P.K. Sport	Porsche 996 GT3-RS	Porsche 3.6 L Flat-6	D	60	(United Kingdom) Mike Youles	3–4
(United Kingdom) P.K. Sport	Porsche 996 GT3-RS	Porsche 3.6 L Flat-6	D	60	(United Kingdom) Robin Liddell	3–4
(United Kingdom) P.K. Sport	Porsche 996 GT3-R (Rd. 3) Porsche 996 GT3-RS (Rd. 4)	Porsche 3.6 L Flat-6	D	61	(United Kingdom) Mark Humphrey	3–4
(United Kingdom) P.K. Sport	Porsche 996 GT3-R (Rd. 3) Porsche 996 GT3-RS (Rd. 4)	Porsche 3.6 L Flat-6	D	61	(United Kingdom) Piers Masarati	3–4
(France) Noël del Bello	Porsche 996 GT3-R	Porsche 3.6 L Flat-6	D	63	(France) Marc Sourd	3
(France) Noël del Bello	Porsche 996 GT3-R	Porsche 3.6 L Flat-6	D	63	(France) Georges Forgeois	3
(France) Noël del Bello	Porsche 996 GT3-R	Porsche 3.6 L Flat-6	D	63	(France) Patrick Caternet	3
(Spain) Paco Orti Racing	Porsche 996 GT3-R	Porsche 3.6 L Flat-6	D	65	(Spain) Paco Orti	3–4
(Spain) Paco Orti Racing	Porsche 996 GT3-R	Porsche 3.6 L Flat-6	D	65	(Spain) Jésus Diez de Villarroel	3–4
(United States) The Racer's Group	Porsche 996 GT3-RS	Porsche 3.6 L Flat-6	Y	66	(United States) Kevin Buckler	2, 5–6, 9
(United States) The Racer's Group	Porsche 996 GT3-RS	Porsche 3.6 L Flat-6	Y	66	(United States) Tom McGlynn	2
(United States) The Racer's Group	Porsche 996 GT3-RS	Porsche 3.6 L Flat-6	Y	66	(United States) Stephen Earle	2
(United States) The Racer's Group	Porsche 996 GT3-RS	Porsche 3.6 L Flat-6	Y	66	(United States) Tyler McQuarrie	5–6, 9
(United States) The Racer's Group	Porsche 996 GT3-R	Porsche 3.6 L Flat-6	Y	67	(United States) Robert Orcutt	5, 9
(United States) The Racer's Group	Porsche 996 GT3-R	Porsche 3.6 L Flat-6	Y	67	(United States) Vic Rice	5
(United States) The Racer's Group	Porsche 996 GT3-R	Porsche 3.6 L Flat-6	Y	67	(United States) Tony Colicchio	9
(United Kingdom) Harlow Motorsport	Porsche 996 GT3-R	Porsche 3.6 L Flat-6	D	66	(United Kingdom) Terry Rymer	4
(United Kingdom) Harlow Motorsport	Porsche 996 GT3-R	Porsche 3.6 L Flat-6	D	66	(South Africa) Stephen Watson	4
(United Kingdom) Harlow Motorsport	Porsche 996 GT3-R	Porsche 3.6 L Flat-6	D	67	(United Kingdom) Paul Fuller	4*
(United Kingdom) Harlow Motorsport	Porsche 996 GT3-R	Porsche 3.6 L Flat-6	D	67	(United Kingdom) Marcus Fothergill	4*
(United Kingdom) Atomic Kitten Racing	Chevrolet Corvette C5	Chevrolet 5.7 L V8	D	68	(United Kingdom) Roger Walters	10*
(United Kingdom) Atomic Kitten Racing	Chevrolet Corvette C5	Chevrolet 5.7 L V8	D	68	(United Kingdom) Tom Bellamy	10*
(Canada) Kyser Racing	Porsche 996 GT3-R	Porsche 3.6 L Flat-6	D	69	(United States) Joe Foster	2–3, 5–6, 8–10
(Canada) Kyser Racing	Porsche 996 GT3-R	Porsche 3.6 L Flat-6	D	69	(Canada) Kye Wankum	2–3, 5–10
(Canada) Kyser Racing	Porsche 996 GT3-R	Porsche 3.6 L Flat-6	D	69	(Canada) Jeffrey Pabst	2, 5, 7
(Canada) Kyser Racing	Porsche 996 GT3-R	Porsche 3.6 L Flat-6	D	69	(United States) Doc Bundy	10
(United States) Gunnar Racing	Porsche 996 GT3-RS	Porsche 3.6 L Flat-6	D	75	(United States) Gunnar Jeannette	10
(United States) Gunnar Racing	Porsche 996 GT3-RS	Porsche 3.6 L Flat-6	D	75	(United States) Joe Policastro, Jr.	10
(United States) Gunnar Racing	Porsche 996 GT3-RS	Porsche 3.6 L Flat-6	D	75	(United States) Joe Policastro, Sr.	10
(United States) Kelly-Moss Motorsports	Porsche 996 GT3-R	Porsche 3.6 L Flat-6	Y	98	(United States) Rick Polk	1–2
(United States) Kelly-Moss Motorsports	Porsche 996 GT3-R	Porsche 3.6 L Flat-6	Y	98	(United States) Cort Wagner	1–2
(United States) Kelly-Moss Motorsports	Porsche 996 GT3-R	Porsche 3.6 L Flat-6	Y	98	(United States) Darren Law	2
(United States) Kelly-Moss Motorsports	Porsche 996 GT3-RS	Porsche 3.6 L Flat-6	Y	99	(United States) Anthony Lazzaro	1–2
(United States) Kelly-Moss Motorsports	Porsche 996 GT3-RS	Porsche 3.6 L Flat-6	Y	99	(France) Christophe Bouchut	1
(United States) Kelly-Moss Motorsports	Porsche 996 GT3-RS	Porsche 3.6 L Flat-6	Y	99	(United States) David Murry	2
(United States) Kelly-Moss Motorsports	Porsche 996 GT3-RS	Porsche 3.6 L Flat-6	Y	99	(Italy) Vincenzo Sospiri	2

* Was on the entry list but did not participate in the event.

== Season results ==
Overall winner in bold.

Rnd	Circuit	LMP900 Winning Team	LMP675 Winning Team	GTS Winning Team	GT Winning Team	Results
Rnd	Circuit	LMP900 Winning Drivers	LMP675 Winning Drivers	GTS Winning Drivers	GT Winning Drivers	Results
1	Texas	**(Germany) #1 Audi Sport North America**	None	(United States) #3 Corvette Racing	(United States) #23 Alex Job Racing	Results
1	Texas	**(Denmark) Tom Kristensen** **(Italy) Rinaldo Capello**		(Canada) Ron Fellows (United States) Johnny O'Connell	(Germany) Sascha Maassen (Germany) Lucas Luhr	Results
2	Sebring	**(Germany) #1 Audi Sport North America**	None	(Germany) #26 Konrad Team Saleen	(United States) #23 Alex Job Racing	Results
2	Sebring	**(Italy) Rinaldo Capello** **(Italy) Michele Alboreto** **(France) Laurent Aïello**		(United Kingdom) Oliver Gavin (United States) Terry Borcheller (Austria) Franz Konrad	(Germany) Sascha Maassen (Germany) Lucas Luhr (France) Emmanuel Collard	Results
3	Donington	**(Germany) #1 Audi Sport Team Joest**	(United Kingdom) #21 Rowan Racing	(United Kingdom) #41 Ray Mallock Ltd.	(United States) #23 Alex Job Racing	Results
3	Donington	**(Denmark) Tom Kristensen** **(Italy) Rinaldo Capello**	(United Kingdom) Martin O'Connell (United Kingdom) Warren Carway	(Belgium) Bruno Lambert (United Kingdom) Ian McKellar Jr.	(Germany) Lucas Luhr (Germany) Sascha Maassen	Results
4	Jarama	**(Germany) #1 Audi Sport Team Joest**	(United States) #5 Dick Barbour Racing	(Germany) #23 Konrad Team Saleen	(Germany) #43 Team Schnitzer	Results
4	Jarama	**(Denmark) Tom Kristensen** **(Italy) Rinaldo Capello**	(Belgium) Eric van de Poele (Belgium) Didier de Radiguès	(Switzerland) Toni Seiler (Switzerland) Walter Brun (Austria) Franz Konrad	(Germany) Dirk Müller (Sweden) Fredrik Ekblom	Results
5	Sears Point	**(Germany) #1 Audi Sport North America**	(United States) #57 Dick Barbour Racing	(United States) #3 Corvette Racing	(Germany) #42 BMW Motorsport	Results
5	Sears Point	**(Denmark) Tom Kristensen** **(Italy) Rinaldo Capello**	(Canada) John Graham (Venezuela) Milka Duno (Belgium) Didier de Radiguès	(Canada) Ron Fellows (United States) Johnny O'Connell	(Finland) JJ Lehto (Germany) Jörg Müller	Results
6	Portland	**(United States) #50 Panoz Motor Sports**	(United States) #57 Dick Barbour Racing	(United States) #3 Corvette Racing	(United States) #6 PTG	Results
6	Portland	**(Denmark) Jan Magnussen** **(Australia) David Brabham**	(Canada) John Graham (Venezuela) Milka Duno (Belgium) Didier de Radiguès	(Canada) Ron Fellows (United States) Johnny O'Connell	(Germany) Hans Joachim Stuck (United States) Boris Said	Results
7	Mosport	**(Germany) #2 Audi Sport North America**	(United States) #5 Dick Barbour Racing	(United States) #3 Corvette Racing	(Germany) #42 BMW Motorsport	Results
7	Mosport	**(Germany) Frank Biela** **(Italy) Emanuele Pirro**	(Belgium) Bruno Lambert (Belgium) Didier de Radiguès	(Canada) Ron Fellows (United States) Johnny O'Connell	(Finland) JJ Lehto (Germany) Jörg Müller	Results
8	Mid-Ohio	**(United States) #50 Panoz Motor Sports**	(United States) #5 Dick Barbour Racing	(United States) #3 Corvette Racing	(Germany) #42 BMW Motorsport	Results
8	Mid-Ohio	**(Denmark) Jan Magnussen** **(Australia) David Brabham**	(Belgium) Bruno Lambert (Belgium) Didier de Radiguès	(Canada) Ron Fellows (United States) Johnny O'Connell	(Finland) JJ Lehto (Germany) Jörg Müller	Results
9	Laguna Seca	**(Germany) #2 Audi Sport North America**	(United States) #5 Dick Barbour Racing	(Germany) #26 Konrad Team Saleen	(Germany) #42 BMW Motorsport	Results
9	Laguna Seca	**(Germany) Frank Biela** **(Italy) Emanuele Pirro**	(Belgium) Didier de Radigues (Venezuela) Milka Duno	(United States) Terry Borcheller (Austria) Franz Konrad	(Finland) JJ Lehto (Germany) Jörg Müller	Results
10	Road Atlanta	**(Germany) #2 Audi Sport North America**	(United States) #57 Dick Barbour Racing	(United States) #4 Corvette Racing	(United States) #6 PTG	Results
10	Road Atlanta	**(Germany) Frank Biela** **(Italy) Emanuele Pirro**	(Canada) Scott Maxwell (Canada) John Graham (Venezuela) Milka Duno	(United States) Kelly Collins (United States) Andy Pilgrim (France) Franck Fréon	(Germany) Hans Joachim Stuck (United States) Boris Said (United States) Bill Auberlen	Results

== Championship results ==
Points are awarded to the finishers in the following order:

- 25-21-19-17-15-14-13-12-11-10-...

Exceptions being for the 12 Hours of Sebring and Petit Le Mans which awarded in the following order:

- 30-26-24-22-20-19-18-17-16-15-...

Points were awarded in two separate ways. Only the best finish out of the two European rounds (3 and 4) was included. In addition to this, only the top eight finishes for the entire season were included. Points earned but not counting towards the team's total are listed in italics.

Teams only score the points of their highest finishing entry in each race.

Points systems
Race	1st	2nd	3rd	4th	5th	6th	7th	8th	9th	10th	11th	12th	13th	14th	15th	16th	17th	18th	19th	FL	lap lead
Normal	25	21	19	17	15	14	13	12	11	10	9	8	7	6	5	4	3	2	1	1	1
1000+ km	30	26	24	22	20	19	18	17	16	15	14	13	12	11	10	9	8	7	6	1	1

=== LMP900 Drivers' Championship ===
Bold - Pole position. F - Fastest lap. L - led a lap. M - led the most laps. * - Not awarded points.

Pos.	Driver	Team	TEX (United States)	SEB (United States)	DON (United Kingdom)	JAR (Spain)	SON (United States)	POR (United States)	MOS (Canada)	MOH (United States)	LAG (United States)	ATL (United States)	Pts.
1	(Italy) Emanuele Pirro	(Germany) Audi Sport North America	2^{LF}	**2^{L}**	2^{L}	2^{LF}	2^{L}	2^{L}	1^{LF}	4	1^{L}	1^{LM}	202
2	(Germany) Frank Biela	(Germany) Audi Sport North America	2^{L}	**2^{L}**	2^{L}	2^{L}	2^{F}	2	1	4^{L}	1^{LM}	1^{LF}	198
3	(Italy) Rinaldo Capello	(Germany) Audi Sport North America	**1^{LM}**	1^{LM}	**1^{L}**	**1^{L}**	**1^{LM}**	5	**7**	**2^{L}**	**8^{F}**	**8***	175
4	(Denmark) Tom Kristensen	(Germany) Audi Sport North America	**1^{LM}**	**2^{LF}**	**1^{LMF}**	**1^{L}**	**1^{L}**	5^{LF}	**7***	**2^{LMF}**	**8**	**8***	161
5	(Denmark) Jan Magnussen	(United States) Panoz Motor Sports	3	8*	7	5	3	**1^{L}**	2^{LM}	1^{L}	9^{L}	6	159
6	(United Kingdom) Andy Wallace	(United States) Champion Racing	4^{L}	3			4	3	6^{L}	5	2	3	153
7	(Australia) David Brabham	(United States) Panoz Motor Sports	3^{L}	8*	7	5*	3	**1^{LM}**	2	1	9	6^{L}	145
8	(United Kingdom) Johnny Herbert	(United States) Champion Racing					4	3	6^{L}	5	2^{L}	3^{L}	113
9	(Sweden) Stefan Johansson	(United Kingdom) Johansson Motorsport		4	3	3^{LM}					3	2^{L}	89
10	(France) Christophe Tinseau	(United States) Team Cadillac					5		3	8	5	4	83
11	(Italy) Max Angelelli	(United States) Team Cadillac					7		4	7	4	4	82
11	(South Africa) Wayne Taylor	(United States) Team Cadillac					7		4	7	4	4	82
13	(France) Emmanuel Collard	(United States) Team Cadillac					5		3	8	5	5	81
14	(Germany) Klaus Graf	(United States) Panoz Motor Sports	5^{L}	9*	6	4	8*	4^{L}	8*	6	6	9*	79
15	(France) Franck Lagorce	(United States) Panoz Motor Sports				4	8	4^{L}	8*	6	6	9*	75
16	(United States) Butch Leitzinger	(United States) Dyson Racing Team		6					5	3		7	71
17	(United States) Jon Field	(United States) Intersport Racing		5			6			9	7	DSQ	58
18	(France) Patrick Lemarié	(United Kingdom) Team Ascari			DNS								46
18	(France) Patrick Lemarié	(United Kingdom) Johansson Motorsport									3	2^{L}	46
19	(United Kingdom) Guy Smith	(United Kingdom) Johansson Motorsport		4^{L}	3	3							42
20	(United States) Dorsey Schroeder	(United States) Champion Racing	4	3									41
21	(United Kingdom) James Weaver	(United States) Dyson Racing Team		6					5	3		7	34
22	(Italy) Michele Alboreto	(Germany) Audi Sport North America		1^{L}									31
22	(France) Laurent Aïello	(Germany) Audi Sport North America		1^{L}									31
24	(Brazil) Gaulter Salles	(United States) Panoz Motor Sports	5	9*	6								29
24	(United States) Jay Cochran	(United States) Panoz Motor Sports	6										29
24	(United States) Jay Cochran	(United Kingdom) Westward Racing			5								29
26	(United States) Rick Sutherland	(United States) Intersport Racing		5			6*			9*	7	DSQ	27
27	(Germany) Ralf Kelleners	(United States) Champion Racing		3									24
28	(United States) Duncan Dayton	(United States) Intersport Racing		5									20
28	(Belgium) Marc Goossens	(United States) Team Cadillac										5	20
30	(United States) Elliot Forbes-Robinson	(United States) Dyson Racing Team		6								7*	19
31	(France) Sébastien Bourdais	(France) Pescarolo Sport		7									18
32	(United Kingdom) Richard Dean	(United States) Panoz Motor Sports	6										14
33	(United States) Joel Field	(United States) Intersport Racing								9			11
-	(France) Jean-Christophe Boullion	(France) Pescarolo Sport		7*	4*								0
-	(France) Laurent Redon	(France) Pescarolo Sport		7*	4*								0
-	(United States) Peter Boss	(United Kingdom) Westward Racing			5*								0
-	(Monaco) Olivier Beretta	(France) Team PlayStation			8*								0
-	(France) Yannick Dalmas	(France) Team PlayStation			8*								0
-	(South Africa) Werner Lupberger	(United Kingdom) Team Ascari			9*								0
-	(United Kingdom) Ben Collins	(United Kingdom) Team Ascari			9*								0
-	(Netherlands) Klaas Zwart	(United Kingdom) Team Ascari			DNS								0
-	(Finland) Harri Toivonen	(United Kingdom) Team Ascari			DNS								0
-	(United States) Mark Neuhaus	(United States) Intersport Racing										DSQ	0
Pos.	Driver	Team	TEX (United States)	SEB (United States)	DON (United Kingdom)	JAR (Spain)	SON (United States)	POR (United States)	MOS (Canada)	MOH (United States)	LAG (United States)	ATL (United States)	Pts.

==== LMP900 Teams Championship ====
Teams only score the points of their highest finishing entry in each race.

Pos.	Team	No.	TEX (United States)	SEB (United States)	DON (United Kingdom)	JAR (Spain)	SON (United States)	POR (United States)	MOS (Canada)	MOH (United States)	LAG (United States)	ATL (United States)	Pts.
1	(Germany) Audi Sport North America	1	**1**	1	**1**	**1**	**1**	5	**7**	**2**	**8**	**8**	206
1	(Germany) Audi Sport North America	2	2	**2**	2	2	2	2	1	4	1	1	206
2	(United States) Panoz Motor Sports	49	6										162
2	(United States) Panoz Motor Sports	50	3	8	7	5	3	**1**	2	1	9	6	162
2	(United States) Panoz Motor Sports	51	5	9	6	4	8	4	8	6	6	9	162
3	(United States) Champion Racing	38	4	3			4	3	6	5	2	3	151
4	(United States) Team Cadillac	7					5		3	8	5	5	86
4	(United States) Team Cadillac	8					7		4	7	4	4	86
4	(United Kingdom) Johansson Motorsport	7/18		4	3	3					3	2	86
6	(United States) Intersport Racing	36										DNP	73
6	(United States) Intersport Racing	37		5			6			9	7	DSQ	73
7	(United States) Dyson Racing Team	16		6					5	3		7	71
8	(France) Pescarolo Sport	72		7	4								35
-	(United Kingdom) Westward Racing	8			5								0
-	(France) Team PlayStation	6			8								0
-	(United Kingdom) Team Ascari	3			9								0
-	(United Kingdom) Team Ascari	4			DNS								0
Pos.	Team		TEX (United States)	SEB (United States)	DON (United Kingdom)	JAR (Spain)	SON (United States)	POR (United States)	MOS (Canada)	MOH (United States)	LAG (United States)	ATL (United States)	Pts.

==== LMP675 Drivers' Championship ====
Bold - Pole position. F - Fastest lap. L - led a lap. M - led the most laps. * - Not awarded points.

Pos.	Driver	Team	TEX (United States)	SEB (United States)	DON (United Kingdom)	JAR (Spain)	SON (United States)	POR (United States)	MOS (Canada)	MOH (United States)	LAG (United States)	ATL (United States)	Pts.
1	(Belgium) Didier de Radiguès	(United States) Dick Barbour Racing			2^{F}	1^{F}	1^{F}	1^{F}	1^{F}	1	1^{F}	3^{F}	180
2	(Venezuela) Milka Duno	(United States) Dick Barbour Racing				3*	1	1	2	4*	1	1	126
3	(Canada) John Graham	(United States) Dick Barbour Racing				3*	1	1	2	4*	2*	1	101
4	(United States) Steven Knight	(United States) Roock-KnightHawk Racing	1^{F}	1*				2	3*	2	3*	4	90
5	(Germany) Claudia Hürtgen	(United States) Roock-KnightHawk Racing		1*					3	2	3	4	81
6	(Belgium) Bruno Lambert	(United States) Dick Barbour Racing							1	1^{F}		3	75
7	(United States) Mel Hawkins	(United States) Roock-KnightHawk Racing	1*	1*		2		2				4	64
8	(Canada) Scott Maxwell	(United States) Dick Barbour Racing									2	1	51
9	(United Kingdom) Ben Devlin	(United States) Archangel Motorsports										2	26
9	(United States) Jason Workman	(United States) Archangel Motorsports										2	26
9	(United States) Andrew Davis	(United States) Archangel Motorsports										2	26
12	(Belgium) Eric van de Poele	(United States) Dick Barbour Racing			2*	1							25
13	(Spain) Jordi Gené	(France) ROC										6^{L}	20
14	(United States) Jimmy Adams	(United States) Southern Comfort Racing								3			19
-	(United Kingdom) Martin O'Connell	(United Kingdom) Rowan Racing			1*								0
-	(United Kingdom) Warren Carway	(United Kingdom) Rowan Racing			1*								0
-	(South Africa) Earl Goddard	(United States) Roock-KnightHawk Racing				2*						3*	0
-	(Spain) Tomás Saldaña	(United States) Roock-KnightHawk Racing				2*							0
-	(United States) Jimmy Adams	(United States) Southern Comfort Racing								3*			0
-	(United States) Chris McMurry	(United States) Team Bucknum Racing										5*	0
-	(United States) Bret Arsenault	(United States) Team Bucknum Racing										5*	0
-	(United States) Bryan Willman	(United States) Team Bucknum Racing										5*	0
-	(France) Yannick Schroeder	(France) ROC										6*	0
-	(Switzerland) Jean-Denis Délétraz	(France) ROC										6*	0
Pos.	Driver	Team	TEX (United States)	SEB (United States)	DON (United Kingdom)	JAR (Spain)	SON (United States)	POR (United States)	MOS (Canada)	MOH (United States)	LAG (United States)	ATL (United States)	Pts.

==== LMP675 Teams Championship ====
Teams only score the points of their highest finishing entry in each race.

Pos.	Team	No.	TEX (United States)	SEB (United States)	DON (United Kingdom)	JAR (Spain)	SON (United States)	POR (United States)	MOS (Canada)	MOH (United States)	LAG (United States)	ATL (United States)	Pts.
1	(United States) Dick Barbour Racing	5			2	**1**			1	**1**	**1**	**3**	180
1	(United States) Dick Barbour Racing	57				3	**1**	**1**	2	4	2	1	180
2	(United States) Roock-KnightHawk Racing	13	**1**	**1**		2		2	**3**	2	3	4	178
3	(United States) Archangel Motorsports	21										2	26
4	(United States) Team Bucknum Racing	31										5	20
5	(United States) Southern Comfort Racing	48								3			19
5	(France) ROC	39										6	19
-	(United Kingdom) Rowan Racing	21			**1***								0
Pos.	Team	No.	TEX (United States)	SEB (United States)	DON (United Kingdom)	JAR (Spain)	SON (United States)	POR (United States)	MOS (Canada)	MOH (United States)	LAG (United States)	ATL (United States)	Pts.

==== GTS Drivers' Championship ====
Bold - Pole position. F - Fastest lap. L - led a lap. M - led the most laps. * - Not awarded points.

Pos.	Driver	Team	TEX (United States)	SEB (United States)	DON (United Kingdom)	JAR (Spain)	SON (United States)	POR (United States)	MOS (Canada)	MOH (United States)	LAG (United States)	ATL (United States)	Pts.
1	(United States) Terry Borcheller	(United States) American Viperacing	2										187
1	(United States) Terry Borcheller	(Germany) Konrad Team Saleen		1^{F}			3^{F}	3^{F}	2^{F}	3^{F}	1^{F}	2^{F}	187
2	(Austria) Franz Konrad	(Germany) Konrad Team Saleen		1	2*	1	3	3	2	3	1	2	184
3	(Canada) Ron Fellows	(United States) Corvette Racing	1^{F}	3			1	1	1	1	2	DSQ	171
4	(United States) Johnny O'Connell	(United States) Corvette Racing	1	3			1	1	1	1	2	DSQ	170
5	(United States) Andy Pilgrim	(United States) Corvette Racing	4	2			2	DSQ	3	2	3	1	153
5	(United States) Kelly Collins	(United States) Corvette Racing	4	2			2	DSQ	3	2	3	1	153
7	(United States) Tom Weickardt	(United States) American Viperacing	3	5			5	4	5	5*	4	5	123
8	(United States) Shane Lewis	(United States) American Viperacing					4	2	4	4	5		87
9	(United Kingdom) Oliver Gavin	(Germany) Konrad Team Saleen		1	2^{F}								74
9	(United Kingdom) Oliver Gavin	(United States) Fordahl Motorsports										4	74
10	(United States) Jeff Altenburg	(United States) American Viperacing		4			4	2					60
11	(France) Franck Fréon	(United States) Corvette Racing		2								1	56
12	(United States) Joe Ellis	(United States) American Viperacing	3	5						5			54
12	(United States) Joe Ellis	(United Kingdom) Brookspeed										8	54
13	(United States) Kevin Allen	(United States) American Viperacing						4	5			5	52
14	(United States) Erik Messley	(United States) American Viperacing	2	4									43
15	(United States) David Donohue	(United States) American Viperacing							4	4			34
16	(United States) Charles Slater	(Germany) Konrad Team Saleen										2	26
17	(United States) Chris Kneifel	(United States) Corvette Racing		3									24
17	(Netherlands) Mike Hezemans	(United States) American Viperacing										3	24
17	(Belgium) Anthony Kumpen	(United States) American Viperacing										3	24
20	(United States) Stu Hayner	(United States) American Viperacing		4									22
20	(United States) Chris Bingham	(United States) Fordahl Motorsports										4	22
20	(United States) Ron Johnson	(United States) Fordahl Motorsports										4	22
23	(United Kingdom) Andy Pardoe	(United States) American Viperacing		5									20
23	(United States) Rick Fairbanks	(United States) American Viperacing										5	20
25	(Switzerland) Walter Brun	(Germany) Konrad Team Saleen				1						6*	19
25	(Switzerland) Toni Seiler	(Germany) Konrad Team Saleen				1						6*	19
27	(Netherlands) Peter Kox	(United Kingdom) Prodrive Allstars										7	18
28	(United States) Mike Silcox	(United States) American Viperacing									4		17
29	(United States) Darren Law	(United States) American Viperacing									5		15
29	(United States) Gene Martindale	(United States) American Viperacing					5						15
-	(United Kingdom) Ian McKellar	(United Kingdom) RML			1*	3*							0
-	(Belgium) Bruno Lambert	(United Kingdom) RML			1*	3*							0
-	(Portugal) Bernardo Sá Nogueira	(Germany) Konrad Motorsport				2*							0
-	(Poland) Maciej Stanco	(Germany) Konrad Motorsport				2*							0
-	(Sweden) Rickard Rydell	(United Kingdom) Prodrive Allstars										7*	0
-	(Belgium) Marc Duez	(United Kingdom) Prodrive Allstars										7*	0
-	(Germany) Dino Steiner	(United Kingdom) Brookspeed										8*	0
-	(United States) John Cooper	(United Kingdom) Brookspeed										8*	0
Pos.	Driver	Team	TEX (United States)	SEB (United States)	DON (United Kingdom)	JAR (Spain)	SON (United States)	POR (United States)	MOS (Canada)	MOH (United States)	LAG (United States)	ATL (United States)	Pts.

==== GTS Teams Championship ====
Teams only score the points of their highest finishing entry in each race.

Pos.	Team	No.	TEX (United States)	SEB (United States)	DON (United Kingdom)	JAR (Spain)	SON (United States)	POR (United States)	MOS (Canada)	MOH (United States)	LAG (United States)	ATL (United States)	Pts.
1	(United States) Corvette Racing	3	**1**	3			1	**1**	1	1	2	DSQ	202
1	(United States) Corvette Racing	4	4	2			2	DSQ	3	2	3	**1**	202
2	(Germany) Konrad Team Saleen	26		**1**	**2**	1	**3**	3	**2**	**3**	**1**	2	184
3	(United States) American Viperacing	44	3	5			5	4	5	5	4	5	156
3	(United States) American Viperacing	45	2	4			4	2	4	4	5	3	156
4	(United States) Fordahl Motorsports	05										4	22
5	(Germany) Konrad Motorsport	44/25				2*						6	19
6	(United Kingdom) Prodrive Allstars	88										7	18
7	(United Kingdom) Brookspeed	19										8	17
-	(United Kingdom) RML	41			1*	**3***							0
Pos.	Team	No.	TEX (United States)	SEB (United States)	DON (United Kingdom)	JAR (Spain)	SON (United States)	POR (United States)	MOS (Canada)	MOH (United States)	LAG (United States)	ATL (United States)	Pts.

==== GT Drivers' Championship ====
Bold - Pole position. F - Fastest lap. L - led a lap. M - led the most laps. * - Not awarded points.

Pos.	Driver	Team	TEX (United States)	SEB (United States)	DON (United Kingdom)	JAR (Spain)	SON (United States)	POR (United States)	MOS (Canada)	MOH (United States)	LAG (United States)	ATL (United States)	Pts.
1	(Germany) Jörg Müller	(Germany) BMW Motorsport	5	3^{F}	10	2	1	3	1	1	1	2	191
2	(Finland) J.J. Lehto	(Germany) BMW Motorsport	5	3	10	2	1	3	1	1	1	4	186
3	(Germany) Sascha Maassen	(United States) Alex Job Racing	1^{F}	1	1	8	5	2	4	6	3	3	177
4	(Germany) Lucas Lühr	(United States) Alex Job Racing	1	1	1	8	5	2	4	6	3	3	176
5	(United States) Boris Said	(United States) BMW Team PTG	3	4			2	1^{F}	3^{F}	7^{F}	4	1	169
6	(Germany) Dirk Müller	(Germany) BMW Motorsport		13	11	1^{F}	3	4	2	2	2	2^{F}	164
7	(Sweden) Fredrik Ekblom	(Germany) BMW Motorsport		13	11^{F}	1	3	4	2	2	2^{F}	4	159
8	(Germany) Hans-Joachim Stuck	(United States) BMW Team PTG	3	4			2	1	3	7	11	1	158
9	(United States) Randy Pobst	(United States) Alex Job Racing	2	2	2	3	11	5	8	3	6	5	148
9	(Germany) Christian Menzel	(United States) Alex Job Racing	2	2	2		11	5	8	3	6	5	148
11	(United Kingdom) Johnny Mowlem	(United States) Petersen Motorsports	4	WD			6	6	10*	5	5	6	111
11	(United Kingdom) Johnny Mowlem	(Germany) Seikel Motorsport			4								111
12	(Canada) Kye Wankum	(Canada) Kyser Racing		7	5		12*	7	6	10	9	8	98
13	(United States) Joe Foster	(Canada) Kyser Racing		7	5		12*	7		10	9	8	95
13	(United States) Joe Foster	(United States) BMW Team PTG							9				95
14	(Canada) Tony Burgess	(Germany) Seikel Motorsport	8		4	7	9		5	8	12	7	93
15	(United States) Bill Auberlen	(United States) BMW Team PTG	7	19*			4^{F}	8			4	1	90
16	(Sweden) Niclas Jönsson	(United States) BMW Team PTG	7	19*			4	8	9	4	11	15*	79
16	(Germany) Timo Bernhard	(United States) Alex Job Racing		2									79
16	(Germany) Timo Bernhard	(United States) Petersen Motorsports					6	6	10		5		79
18	(Mexico) Randy Wars	(United States) Dick Barbour Racing		15*			10	9	7	9	10		55
19	(France) Emmanuel Collard	(United States) Alex Job Racing		1		3							49
20	(Canada) Jeffrey Pabst	(Canada) Kyser Racing		7			12		6				40
21	(United States) Peter Cunningham	(United States) BMW Team PTG		4						4			39
21	(United States) Kevin Buckler	(United States) The Racer's Group		12			7				7		39
21	(United Kingdom) Stephen Earle	(United States) The Racer's Group		12									39
21	(United Kingdom) Stephen Earle	(United Kingdom) Sebah			12	10						9	39
24	(France) Christophe Bouchut	(United States) Kelly-Moss Motorsports	6										34
24	(France) Christophe Bouchut	(France) Larbre Compétition		5									34
24	(United States) Mike Fitzgerald	(United States) Petersen Motorsports								5		6	34
26	(United States) Grady Willingham	(United States) Dick Barbour Racing		15			10		7			14*	33
27	(Italy) Gabrio Rosa	(Germany) Seikel Motorsport		6	7								32
28	(Italy) Stefano Buttiero	(Germany) Seikel Motorsport	8									7	30
29	(United States) Tyler McQuarrie	(United States) The Racer's Group					7				7		26
30	(United States) Robert Orcutt	(United States) The Racer's Group					8				8		24
31	(United States) Philip Collin	(Germany) Seikel Motorsport		18*			9			8			23
31	(United States) Cort Wagner	(United States) Kelly-Moss Motorsports	10	17*									23
31	(United States) Cort Wagner	(United States) Aspen Knolls/MCR										12	23
33	(United States) Shane Lewis	(United States) Aspen Knolls/MCR	11	20*								12	22
33	(Austria) Karl Wendlinger	(Germany) BMW Motorsport										4	22
35	(United States) Mark Neuhaus	(United States) Dick Barbour Racing		15*				9*		9	10		21
36	(France) Patrice Goueslard	(France) Larbre Compétition		5									20
36	(France) Sébastien Dumez	(France) Larbre Compétition		5									20
38	(Italy) Alex Caffi	(Germany) Seikel Motorsport		6									19
38	(Italy) Fabio Babini	(Germany) Seikel Motorsport		6									19
38	(France) Jean-Christophe Boullion	(United States) Petersen Motorsports										6	19
41	(United States) Hugh Plumb	(Germany) Seikel Motorsport										7	18
42	(France) Bob Wollek	(United States) Petersen Motorsports	4	WD									17
42	(Germany) Jürgen Alzen	(Germany) Jürgen Alzen Motorsport		8									17
42	(Germany) Ulli Richter	(Germany) Jürgen Alzen Motorsport		8									17
42	(United States) Doc Bundy	(Canada) Kyser Racing										8	17
46	(Germany) Wolfgang Kaufmann	(Germany) Freisinger Motorsport		9									16
46	(France) Stéphane Ortelli	(Germany) Freisinger Motorsport		9									16
46	(United Kingdom) Bart Hayden	(United Kingdom) Sebah			12*	10*						9	16
46	(United Kingdom) Hugh Hayden	(United Kingdom) Sebah										9	16
50	(United States) Keith Alexander	(United States) Cirtek Motorsport		10									15
50	(United Kingdom) Gavin Pickering	(United States) Cirtek Motorsport		10									15
50	(United States) Chris Gleason	(United States) Cirtek Motorsport		10									15
50	(Sweden) Magnus Wallinder	(Germany) Seikel Motorsport							5				15
50	(United States) Scooter Gabel	(United States) Orbit										10	15
50	(United States) Gary Schultheis	(United States) Orbit										10	15
50	(United States) Doc Lowman	(United States) Orbit										10	15
57	(United States) Anthony Lazzaro	(United States) Kelly-Moss Motorsports	6	21*									14
57	(United Kingdom) Nigel Smith	(Germany) Freisinger Motorsport		11									14
57	(Germany) Klaus Horn	(Germany) Freisinger Motorsport		11									14
57	(United States) Joe Policastro, Sr.	(United States) Gunnar Racing										11	14
57	(United States) Joe Policastro, Jr.	(United States) Gunnar Racing										11	14
62	(United States) Tom McGlynn	(United States) The Racer's Group		12									13
63	(United States) Vic Rice	(United States) Aspen Knolls/MCR	11*	20*									12
63	(United States) Vic Rice	(United States) The Racer's Group					8						12
63	(United States) Tony Colicchio	(United States) The Racer's Group									8		12
63	(United States) Leo Hindery	(United States) Orbit		DSQ								13	12
63	(United States) Peter Baron	(United States) Orbit		DSQ								13	12
63	(United States) Tony Kester	(United States) Orbit		DNS								13	12
68	(United States) Owen Trinkler	(United States) Trinkler Racing, LLC	9	16*									11
68	(United States) Jeff Altenburg	(United States) Trinkler Racing, LLC	9										11
68	(Austria) Philipp Peter	(Germany) RWS Motorsport		14									11
68	(United Kingdom) Sam Hancock	(United States) Dick Barbour Racing										14	11
72	(United States) Rick Polk	(United States) Kelly-Moss Motorsports	10	17*									10
72	(United States) Dave McEntee	(United States) Dick Barbour Racing					10						10
72	(United States) David Murry	(United States) Kelly-Moss Motorsports		21*									10
72	(United States) David Murry	(United States) BMW Team PTG										15	10
75	(New Zealand) Andrew Bagnall	(Germany) Seikel Motorsport		18*							12		8
-	(United Kingdom) Mike Youles	(United Kingdom) P.K. Sport			3*	5*							0
-	(United Kingdom) Robin Liddell	(United Kingdom) P.K. Sport			3*	5*							0
-	(United Kingdom) Mark Humphrey	(United Kingdom) P.K. Sport			9*	4*							0
-	(United Kingdom) Piers Masarati	(United Kingdom) P.K. Sport			9*	4*							0
-	(Spain) Paco Orti	(United States) Broadfoot Racing		DSQ									0
-	(Spain) Paco Orti	(Spain) Paco Orti Racing			6*	6*							0
-	(Spain) Jésus Diez de Villarroel	(Spain) Paco Orti Racing			6*	6*							0
-	(Italy) Luca Drudi	(Germany) Seikel Motorsport			7*								0
-	(Morocco) Max Cohen-Olivar	(Germany) Seikel Motorsport				7*							0
-	(France) Marc Sourd	(France) Noël del Bello			8*								0
-	(France) Georges Forgeois	(France) Noël del Bello			8*								0
-	(France) Patrick Caternet	(France) Noël del Bello			8*								0
-	(United Kingdom) Terry Rymer	(United Kingdom) Harlow Motorsport				9*							0
-	(South Africa) Stephen Watson	(United Kingdom) Harlow Motorsport				9*							0
-	(United States) Gunnar Jeannette	(United States) Gunnar Racing										11*	0
-	(United States) Bob Mazzuoccola	(United States) Aspen Knolls/MCR		20*								12*	0
-	(Germany) Norman Simon	(Germany) RWS Motorsport		14*									0
-	(Austria) Dieter Quester	(Germany) RWS Motorsport		14*									0
-	(United States) Taz Harvey	(United States) Dick Barbour Racing										14*	0
-	(United States) Brian Cunningham	(United States) BMW Team PTG										15*	0
-	(United States) Andy Lally	(United States) Trinkler Racing, LLC		16*									0
-	(United States) B. J. Zacharias	(United States) Trinkler Racing, LLC		16*									0
-	(United States) Darren Law	(United States) Kelly-Moss Motorsports		17*									0
-	(Canada) Brian Burgess	(Germany) Seikel Motorsport		18*									0
-	(United States) Joey Hand	(United States) BMW Team PTG		19*									0
-	(Italy) Vincenzo Sospiri	(United States) Kelly-Moss Motorsports		21*									0
-	(Republic of Ireland) Tommy Byrne	(United States) Orbit		DNS								DNP	0
-	(United States) Richard Millman	(United States) Orbit		DNS								DNP	0
-	(United States) John Warner	(United States) Broadfoot Racing		DSQ								DNS	0
-	(United States) Michael Petersen	(United States) Petersen Motorsports		WD									0
-	(United States) Gian Luigi Buitoni	(United States) Orbit		DSQ									0
-	(United States) Allan Ziegelman	(United States) Broadfoot Racing		DSQ									0
-	(United Kingdom) Marino Franchitti	(United States) MSB Motorsport										DSQ	0
-	(United Kingdom) Kelvin Burt	(United States) MSB Motorsport										DSQ	0
-	(Germany) Ralf Kelleners	(United States) MSB Motorsport										DSQ	0
Pos.	Driver	Team	TEX (United States)	SEB (United States)	DON (United Kingdom)	JAR (Spain)	SON (United States)	POR (United States)	MOS (Canada)	MOH (United States)	LAG (United States)	ATL (United States)	Pts.

==== GT Teams' Championship ====
Teams only score the points of their highest finishing entry in each race.

Pos.	Team	No.	TEX (United States)	SEB (United States)	DON (United Kingdom)	JAR (Spain)	SON (United States)	POR (United States)	MOS (Canada)	MOH (United States)	LAG (United States)	ATL (United States)	Pts.
1	(Germany) BMW Motorsport	42	5	3	10	2	1	3	1	1	**1**	**4**	194
1	(Germany) BMW Motorsport	43		13	**11**	**1**	**3**	4	**2**	2	2	2	194
2	(United States) Alex Job Racing	22	2	2	2	3	11	5	8	3	6	5	180
2	(United States) Alex Job Racing	23	**1**	**1**	1	8	5	2	4	**6**	3	3	180
3	(United States) BMW Team PTG	6	3	4			2	**1**	3	7	11	1	170
3	(United States) BMW Team PTG	10	7	19			4	8	9	4	4	15	170
4	(Germany) Seikel Motorsport	52	8	18	4	7	9		5	8	12	7	112
4	(Germany) Seikel Motorsport	53		6	7								112
5	(Canada) Kyser Racing	69		7	5		12	7	6	10	9	8	106
6	(United States) Petersen Motorsports	30	4	WD			6	6	10	5	5	6	104
7	(United States) Dick Barbour Racing	15		15			10	9	7	9	10	14	76
8	(United States) The Racer's Group	66		12			7				7		39
8	(United States) The Racer's Group	67					8				8		39
9	(United States) Aspen Knolls/MCR	12	11	20								12	22
10	(France) Larbre Compétition	00		5									20
11	(Germany) Jürgen Alzen Motorsport	36		8									17
12	(Germany) Freisinger Motorsport	57		11R									16
12	(Germany) Freisinger Motorsport	58		9									16
12	(United Kingdom) Sebah	29/64			12	10						9	16
14	(United States) Cirtek Motorsport	09		10									15
14	(United States) Orbit	32										10	15
14	(United States) Orbit	34		DSQ								13	15
14	(United States) Orbit	35		WD									15
16	(United States) Kelly-Moss Motorsports	98	10	17									14
16	(United States) Kelly-Moss Motorsports	99	6	21									14
16	(United States) Gunnar Racing	75										11	14
18	(United States) Trinkler Racing, LLC	17	9	16									11
18	(Germany) RWS Motorsport	07		14									11
-	(United Kingdom) P.K. Sport	60			3	5							0
-	(United Kingdom) P.K. Sport	61			9	4							0
-	(Spain) Paco Orti Racing	65			6	6							0
-	(France) Noël del Bello	63			8								0
-	(United Kingdom) Harlow Motorsport	66				9							0
-	(United States) Broadfoot Racing	47		DSQ								WD	0
-	(United States) MSB Motorsport	33										DSQ	0
Pos.	Team	No.	TEX (United States)	SEB (United States)	DON (United Kingdom)	JAR (Spain)	SON (United States)	POR (United States)	MOS (Canada)	MOH (United States)	LAG (United States)	ATL (United States)	Pts.
