= Panoz LMP07 =

2000 prototype race car

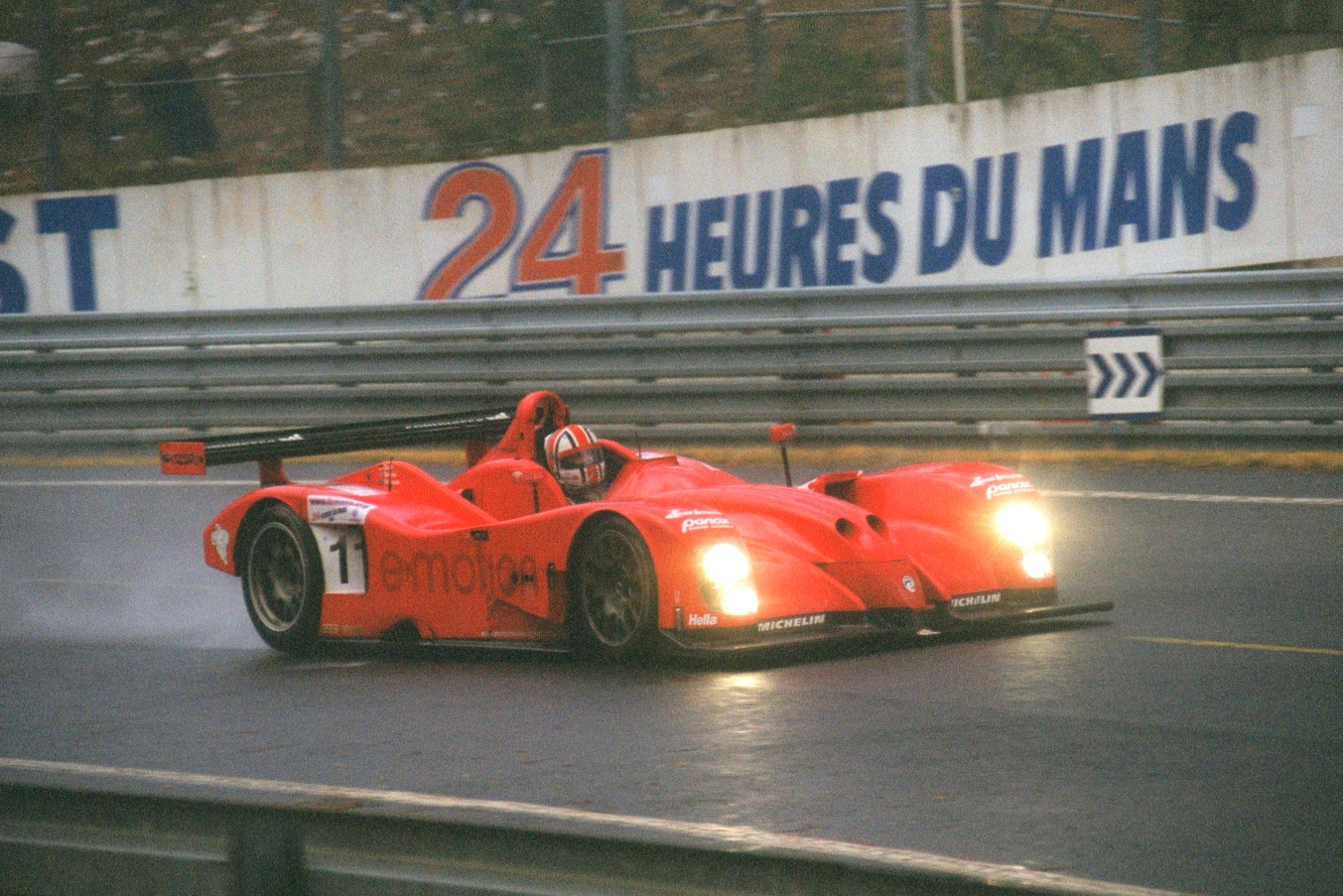
Panoz LMP07 at the 2001 24 Hours of Le Mans

The Panoz LMP07 was a Le Mans prototype built in late 2000 for Panoz for competition in the American Le Mans Series. The car was designed as a successor to the Panoz LMP-1 Roadster-S which had competed since 1999. Although retaining the unusual format of having the engine in front of the cockpit, the LMP07 was quickly found to be lacking the capabilities of its predecessor, forcing Panoz to abandon it and return to the LMP-1 Roadster-S. The LMP07 would survive in the hands of privateers until 2003.

== Development ==
Unlike the Esperante GTR-1 and LMP-1 Roadster-S that had come before, the LMP07 would be designed and built by an entirely new team of manufacturers and designers. Élan Motorsport Technologies would take over from Reynard Motorsport as the main designer and constructor of the car, with Andy Thorby being chief designer. Élan would also turn to Zytek for construction of a custom V8 for the LMP07, replacing the Ford-derived V8 used in the LMP-1 Roadster-S.

Having already established a winning formula with the LMP-1 Roadster-S, the LMP07 can be seen as an evolution of its basic layout. The same front-engine design with a high nose would be retained, while most of the new design elements would be seen in the shallow valleys between the fenders and engine cover, as well as around the cockpit. The LMP07 was designed to attempt to get the car's center of gravity as low as possible in order to improve its handling capabilities.

First and foremost, the shallow bodywork separating the large engine cover and the wheel fenders was redesigned. Instead of a large horizontal edge creating a scoop around the engine, the air would instead be allowed to flow to large vertical intakes placed on either side of the cockpit. This opening up of the area in this valley allowed excess air to better flow out of the back of the car, under its rear wing. To assist in this, large vertical fins were placed on the inside of the fenders, extending off the back of the car to form the rear wing supports. This feature allowed for chassis rigidity, better airflow through the channels, and an improved safety structure. Due to the fins serving as safety structures, this meant that similar structures were not necessary around the cockpit, allowing for even more obstructions in the center of the car to be eliminated, lowering the overall height of the bodywork and further aiding airflow. The cockpit surround was similar to that used on the LMP-1 Roadster-S.

The nose of the car would also be refined, with the NACA duct from the LMP-1 abandoned. Instead, two small porthole intakes would be used, allowing for the bodywork to be closer to the airbox and further lower the height of the bodywork. Brakes cooling was also redesigned, with two large vertical vents cut into the bodywork on either side of the nose, replacing the large gap below the nose that had been used on the LMP-1. At the sides of the car, the complex concave venting of the LMP-1 was simplified for the LMP07, with a large intake for the rear brake cooling being placed in nearly vertical bodywork, and a large square exit vent in front of the rear wheel well for the engine.

The engine for the LMP07 would be a brand new unit built by Zytek. Panoz wished to use a smaller engine in order to bring down the overall weight and center of gravity of the car without major sacrifices to power output. The compact 4.0 litre Zytek units, maintained by Élan, would be lighter and slightly smaller, yet would later be found to lack the power and durability of the older 6.0 litre units.

=== Privateer cars ===
Following Panoz's decision to abandon the LMP07, the cars were transferred to privateer hands. The cars were modified in an attempt to make them more competitive than they had been in Panoz's hands. The Zytek-built V8s were replaced by Mugen Motorsports MF408S 4.0 litre V8s which were small enough to allow for a decrease in the height of the engine cover. This led to the porthole intakes being replaced with the older NACA duct. The side bodywork was also revised to eliminate the large rear brake cooling duct, opting instead for large air exhaust exits from the front wheel well.

== Racing history ==
The LMP07 was announced by Panoz at the 2000 Petit Le Mans, with a presentation model on display. The first working chassis would be completed in time for the final race of the season in December. Running at the Race of a Thousand Years on 31 December 2000 at the Adelaide Street Circuit in Australia, the LMP07 lasted a mere two laps before the alternator failed and the car was forced to retire. Danish driver Jan Magnussen had qualified in 5th place by, almost 2 seconds slower than 3rd placed teammate David Brabham in the LMP-1 Roadster-S, and over 3 seconds slower than Rinaldo Capello in the pole winning Audi R8.

Following off-season testing, the second chassis would make its debut at the first race of the 2001 season, competing alongside two older LMP-1s. The LMP07 would finish third behind two Audi R8s and a lap ahead of the best LMP-1 Roadster-S. With the performance capabilities of the LMP07 shown, both chassis fully replaced the LMP-1s for the 12 Hours of Sebring. However neither car would finish, suffering from mechanical problems early in the event.

When the American Le Mans Series season moved to Europe, the LMP07s were able to fix their mechanical problems and both cars finished at Donington Park. The cars would only manage sixth and eighth places however, with a privateer LMP-1 Roadster-S taking fifth. Problems would once again hit the team at Jarama, as the lone finishing car could manage a mere 14th place. At the 24 Hours of Le Mans, the cars once again suffered problems and both would be retired in the first few hours of the event. Both cars were also slow in comparison to their contemporaries, managing to record only the 19th and 21st fastest times in qualifying, nearly ten seconds slower than the Audis.

Following the performance troubles of the LMP07, most notably at Le Mans, Panoz decided that the cars need to be reworked in order to remain competitive as well as durable. Panoz made the decision to bring back the LMP-1 Roadster-S, completing the season with the older cars while work continued on the LMP07s. By the end of the year, it was decided that it would be easier to upgrade the existing LMP-1s instead of attempting to fix the LMP07s. The three chassis built were therefore sold off to privateer teams for their own use.

MBD Sportscar would purchase two chassis for the 2002 season, adapting the new Mugen V8 to the chassis. Debuting at Sebring, the two cars would continue their difficulties, including one car catching fire. For the rest of the season, although the cars were more reliable, the LMP07-Mugens would only be able to finish better than the factory upgraded LMP01 Evos on one occasion. One MBD entry would also run the 24 Hours of Le Mans but once again fail to finish. MBD Sportscar would abandon the series soon after Le Mans, leaving them to finish seventh in the team championship. The LMP07s would be retired from competition with no other teams wishing to purchase the cars.

== Chassis ==
Only three LMP07s would be constructed. Panoz and MBD Sportscar would be the only teams to run them.

#01

- Panoz Motor Sport (2000-2001)

Adelaide - DNF (2000)
Sebring - DNF
Donington - 6th
Jarama - 14th
Le Mans - DNF

#02

- Panoz Motor Sport (2001)

Texas - 3rd
Sebring - DNF
Donington - 8th
Jarama - DNF
Le Mans - DNF

- MBD Sportscar (2002)

Sebring - DNF
Sears Point - 10th
Mid-Ohio - 8th
Road America - 20th

#03

- MBD Sportscar (2002)

Sebring - DNF
Sears Point - 9th
Mid-Ohio - 18th
Le Mans - DNF
Road America - 22nd

== Results ==
=== American Le Mans Series ===
Year	Entrant	Engine	Tyres	#	Drivers	Races												Points	TC
2000	Panoz Motor Sports	Élan (Zytek) 4.0L V8	M			SEB	CHA	SIL	NUR	SON	MOS	TEX	POR	PET	MON	LSV	ADE	208^{[a]}	3rd
2000	Panoz Motor Sports	Élan (Zytek) 4.0L V8	M	1	Jan Magnussen/Klaus Graf												Ret	208^{[a]}	3rd
2001	Panoz Motor Sports	Élan (Zytek) 4.0L V8	M			TEX	SEB	DON	JAR	SON	POR	MOS	MID	MON	PET			162^{[b]}	2nd
2001	Panoz Motor Sports	Élan (Zytek) 4.0L V8	M	50	Jan Magnussen/David Brabham	3	Ret	7	Ret									162^{[b]}	2nd
2001	Panoz Motor Sports	Élan (Zytek) 4.0L V8	M	51	Klaus Graf/Gualter Salles		Ret	6										162^{[b]}	2nd
2001	Panoz Motor Sports	Élan (Zytek) 4.0L V8	M	51	Klaus Graf/Franck Lagorce				4									162^{[b]}	2nd
2002	MBD Sportscar	Mugen MF408S 4.0 L V8	G			SEB	SON	MID	AME	WAS	TRO	MOS	MON	MIA	PET			55	7th
2002	MBD Sportscar	Mugen MF408S 4.0 L V8	G	17	Scott Maxwell/John Graham/Milka Duno	Ret												55	7th
2002	MBD Sportscar	Mugen MF408S 4.0 L V8	G	17	Scott Maxwell/Milka Duno		7	6	Ret									55	7th
2002	MBD Sportscar	Mugen MF408S 4.0 L V8	G	18	Rick Sutherland/Didier de Radigues/Bruno Lambert	Ret												55	7th
2002	MBD Sportscar	Mugen MF408S 4.0 L V8	G	18	Didier de Radigues/John Graham		6	9	6									55	7th

[a] All points scored in 2000 using the LMP-1 Roadster-S
[b] 90 points scored in 2001 using the LMP-1 Roadster-S

=== 24 Hours of Le Mans ===
Year	Entrant	#	Drivers	Class	Laps	Pos.	Class Pos.
2001	(United States) Panoz Motor Sports	11	(Germany) Klaus Graf (United Kingdom) Jamie Davies (South Africa) Gary Formato	LMP900	92	DNF	DNF
2001	(United States) Panoz Motor Sports	12	(Australia) David Brabham (Denmark) Jan Magnussen (France) Franck Lagorce	LMP900	86	DNF	DNF
2002	(United States) MBD Sportscar Team	19	(Belgium) Didier de Radiguès (Venezuela) Milka Duno (Canada) John Graham	LMP900	259	DNF	DNF
