= 2002 Road America 500 =

Track map of Road America.

The 2002 Road America 500 presented by the Chicago Tribune was the fourth round of the 2002 American Le Mans Series season. It took place at Road America, Wisconsin, on July 7, 2002.

== Official results ==
Class winners in bold.

Pos	Class	No	Team	Drivers	Chassis	Tyre	Laps
Pos	Class	No	Team	Drivers	Engine	Tyre	Laps
1	**LMP900**	**2**	**(Germany) Audi Sport North America**	**(Denmark) Tom Kristensen (Italy) Rinaldo Capello**	**Audi R8**	MI	**118**
1	**LMP900**	**2**	**(Germany) Audi Sport North America**	**(Denmark) Tom Kristensen (Italy) Rinaldo Capello**	**Audi 3.6L Turbo V8**	MI	**118**
2	LMP900	1	(Germany) Audi Sport North America	(Italy) Emanuele Pirro (Germany) Frank Biela	Audi R8	MI	118
2	LMP900	1	(Germany) Audi Sport North America	(Italy) Emanuele Pirro (Germany) Frank Biela	Audi 3.6L Turbo V8	MI	118
3	LMP900	38	(United States) Champion Racing	(United Kingdom) Johnny Herbert (Sweden) Stefan Johansson	Audi R8	MI	118
3	LMP900	38	(United States) Champion Racing	(United Kingdom) Johnny Herbert (Sweden) Stefan Johansson	Audi 3.6L Turbo V8	MI	118
4	LMP900	30	(United States) Intersport	(United States) Clint Field (United States) John Field	Lola B2K/10B	G	111
4	LMP900	30	(United States) Intersport	(United States) Clint Field (United States) John Field	Judd GV4 4.0L V10	G	111
5	**GTS**	**4**	**(United States) Corvette Racing**	**(United States) Andy Pilgrim (United States) Kelly Collins**	**Chevrolet Corvette C5-R**	G	**109**
5	**GTS**	**4**	**(United States) Corvette Racing**	**(United States) Andy Pilgrim (United States) Kelly Collins**	**Chevrolet 7.0L V8**	G	**109**
6	GTS	3	(United States) Corvette Racing	(Canada) Ron Fellows (United States) Johnny O'Connell (United Kingdom) Oliver Gavin	Chevrolet Corvette C5-R	G	108
6	GTS	3	(United States) Corvette Racing	(Canada) Ron Fellows (United States) Johnny O'Connell (United Kingdom) Oliver Gavin	Chevrolet 7.0L V8	G	108
7	GTS	0	(Italy) Team Olive Garden	(Italy) Mimmo Schiattarella (Italy) Emanuele Naspetti	Ferrari 550 Maranello	MI	106
7	GTS	0	(Italy) Team Olive Garden	(Italy) Mimmo Schiattarella (Italy) Emanuele Naspetti	Ferrari 6.0L V12	MI	106
8	**GT**	**22**	**(United States) Alex Job Racing**	**(Germany) Timo Bernhard (Germany) Jörg Bergmeister**	**Porsche 911 GT3-RS**	MI	**104**
8	**GT**	**22**	**(United States) Alex Job Racing**	**(Germany) Timo Bernhard (Germany) Jörg Bergmeister**	**Porsche 3.6L Flat-6**	MI	**104**
9	GT	23	(United States) Alex Job Racing	(Germany) Sascha Maassen (Germany) Lucas Luhr	Porsche 911 GT3-RS	MI	104
9	GT	23	(United States) Alex Job Racing	(Germany) Sascha Maassen (Germany) Lucas Luhr	Porsche 3.6L Flat-6	MI	104
10	**LMP675**	**13**	**(United States) Archangel Motorsports**	**(United States) Peter MacLeod (United States) Larry Oberto (United Kingdom) Ben Devlin**	**Lola B2K/40**	D	**103**
10	**LMP675**	**13**	**(United States) Archangel Motorsports**	**(United States) Peter MacLeod (United States) Larry Oberto (United Kingdom) Ben Devlin**	**Ford (Millington) 2.0L Turbo I4**	D	**103**
11	GT	66	(United States) The Racer's Group	(United States) Kevin Buckler (United States) Michael Schrom (United States) Brian Cunningham	Porsche 911 GT3-RS	MI	103
11	GT	66	(United States) The Racer's Group	(United States) Kevin Buckler (United States) Michael Schrom (United States) Brian Cunningham	Porsche 3.6L Flat-6	MI	103
12	LMP675	77	(United States) AB Motorsport	(United States) Jimmy Adams (United States) Joe Blacker (United States) John Burke	Pilbeam MP84	A	103
12	LMP675	77	(United States) AB Motorsport	(United States) Jimmy Adams (United States) Joe Blacker (United States) John Burke	Nissan (AER) VQL 3.0L V6	A	103
13	GT	52	(Germany) Seikel Motorsport	(United States) Hugh Plumb (United States) Philip Collin (Canada) Tony Burgess	Porsche 911 GT3-RS	Y	102
13	GT	52	(Germany) Seikel Motorsport	(United States) Hugh Plumb (United States) Philip Collin (Canada) Tony Burgess	Porsche 3.6L Flat-6	Y	102
14	GT	42	(United States) Orbit	(United States) John Lloyd (United States) Tony Kester (United States) Gary Schultheis	Porsche 911 GT3-RS	MI	101
14	GT	42	(United States) Orbit	(United States) John Lloyd (United States) Tony Kester (United States) Gary Schultheis	Porsche 3.6L Flat-6	MI	101
15	GT	43	(United States) Orbit	(United States) Leo Hindery (United States) Peter Baron	Porsche 911 GT3-RS	MI	100
15	GT	43	(United States) Orbit	(United States) Leo Hindery (United States) Peter Baron	Porsche 3.6L Flat-6	MI	100
16	GT	34	(France) XL Racing	(Italy) Stefano Buttiero (United States) Craig Stanton	Ferrari 550 Maranello	Y	100
16	GT	34	(France) XL Racing	(Italy) Stefano Buttiero (United States) Craig Stanton	Ferrari 5.4L V12	Y	100
17	GT	89	(Canada) Porschehaus Racing	(Canada) Robert Julien (United States) Adam Merzon	Porsche 911 GT3-RS	D	98
17	GT	89	(Canada) Porschehaus Racing	(Canada) Robert Julien (United States) Adam Merzon	Porsche 3.6L Flat-6	D	98
18 DNF	GTS	44	(United States) American Viperacing	(United States) Marc Bunting (United States) Tom Weickardt (United States) Tom Grunnah	Dodge Viper GTS-R	P	94
18 DNF	GTS	44	(United States) American Viperacing	(United States) Marc Bunting (United States) Tom Weickardt (United States) Tom Grunnah	Dodge 8.0L V10	P	94
19	LMP675	11	(United States) KnightHawk Racing	(United States) Chad Block (United States) Steven Knight (United States) Mel Hawkins	MG-Lola EX257	A	91
19	LMP675	11	(United States) KnightHawk Racing	(United States) Chad Block (United States) Steven Knight (United States) Mel Hawkins	MG (AER) XP20 2.0L Turbo I4	A	91
20 DNF	LMP900	17	(United States) MBD Sportscar	(Canada) Scott Maxwell (Venezuela) Milka Duno	Panoz LMP07	G	89
20 DNF	LMP900	17	(United States) MBD Sportscar	(Canada) Scott Maxwell (Venezuela) Milka Duno	Mugen MF408S 4.0L V8	G	89
21 DNF	GT	79	(United States) J-3 Racing	(United States) Justin Jackson (United States) Mike Fitzgerald (United States) David Murry	Porsche 911 GT3-RS	D	88
21 DNF	GT	79	(United States) J-3 Racing	(United States) Justin Jackson (United States) Mike Fitzgerald (United States) David Murry	Porsche 3.6L Flat-6	D	88
22	LMP900	18	(United States) MBD Sportscar	(Canada) John Graham (Belgium) Didier de Radigues	Panoz LMP07	G	82
22	LMP900	18	(United States) MBD Sportscar	(Canada) John Graham (Belgium) Didier de Radigues	Mugen MF408S 4.0L V8	G	82
23 DNF	LMP675	56	(United States) Team Bucknum Racing	(United States) Jeff Bucknum (United States) Chris McMurry (United States) Bryan Willman	Pilbeam MP84	A	81
23 DNF	LMP675	56	(United States) Team Bucknum Racing	(United States) Jeff Bucknum (United States) Chris McMurry (United States) Bryan Willman	Nissan (AER) VQL 3.4L V6	A	81
24 DNF	LMP900	50	(United States) Panoz Motor Sports	(Australia) David Brabham (Denmark) Jan Magnussen	Panoz LMP01 Evo	MI	69
24 DNF	LMP900	50	(United States) Panoz Motor Sports	(Australia) David Brabham (Denmark) Jan Magnussen	Élan 6L8 6.0L V8	MI	69
25	LMP675	37	(United States) Intersport	(United States) Jon Field (United States) Mike Durand	MG-Lola EX257	G	48
25	LMP675	37	(United States) Intersport	(United States) Jon Field (United States) Mike Durand	MG (AER) XP20 2.0L Turbo I4	G	48
26 DNF	GTS	45	(United States) American Viperacing	(United States) Shane Lewis (Italy) Gianni Morbidelli	Dodge Viper GTS-R	P	45
26 DNF	GTS	45	(United States) American Viperacing	(United States) Shane Lewis (Italy) Gianni Morbidelli	Dodge 8.0L V10	P	45
27 DNF	LMP900	51	(United States) Panoz Motor Sports	(United States) Bryan Herta (United States) Bill Auberlen	Panoz LMP01 Evo	MI	21
27 DNF	LMP900	51	(United States) Panoz Motor Sports	(United States) Bryan Herta (United States) Bill Auberlen	Élan 6L8 6.0L V8	MI	21
28 DNF	GTS	26	(Germany) Konrad Motorsport	(Austria) Franz Konrad (United States) Terry Borcheller	Saleen S7-R	P	8
28 DNF	GTS	26	(Germany) Konrad Motorsport	(Austria) Franz Konrad (United States) Terry Borcheller	Ford 7.0L V8	P	8
DSQ^{†}	GT	31	(United States) Petersen Motorsports	(United States) Randy Pobst (United Kingdom) Johnny Mowlem	Porsche 911 GT3-RS	Y	90
DSQ^{†}	GT	31	(United States) Petersen Motorsports	(United States) Randy Pobst (United Kingdom) Johnny Mowlem	Porsche 3.6L Flat-6	Y	90
DNS	LMP675	62	(United States) Team Spencer Motorsports	(United States) Dennis Spencer (United States) Rich Grupp	Lola B2K/42	A	-
DNS	LMP675	62	(United States) Team Spencer Motorsports	(United States) Dennis Spencer (United States) Rich Grupp	Mazda 1.3L 2-Rotor	A	-

† - #31 Petersen Motorsports was disqualified during the race for receiving outside assistance while still on the track.

== Statistics ==
- Pole Position - #2 Audi Sport North America - 1:52.166
- Fastest Lap - #1 Audi Sport North America - 1:53.403
- Distance - 759.610 km
- Average Speed - 178.710 km/h

American Le Mans Series
Previous race: 2002 American Le Mans at Mid-Ohio	2002 season	Next race: 2002 Grand Prix of Washington D.C.
