= 2001 ELMS at Jarama =

Layout of the Jarama circuit

The 2001 ELMS at Jarama was the third race for the 2001 European Le Mans Series season and the fourth round of the American Le Mans Series season. It took place at Circuito Permanente Del Jarama, Spain, on May 20, 2001.

== Official results ==
Class winners in bold.

Pos	Class	No	Team	Drivers	Chassis	Tyre	Laps
Pos	Class	No	Team	Drivers	Engine	Tyre	Laps
1	**LMP900**	**1**	**(Germany) Audi Sport Team Joest**	**(Denmark) Tom Kristensen (Italy) Rinaldo Capello**	**Audi R8**	M	**114**
1	**LMP900**	**1**	**(Germany) Audi Sport Team Joest**	**(Denmark) Tom Kristensen (Italy) Rinaldo Capello**	**Audi 3.6L Turbo V8**	M	**114**
2	LMP900	2	(Germany) Audi Sport Team Joest	(Germany) Frank Biela (Italy) Emanuele Pirro	Audi R8	M	114
2	LMP900	2	(Germany) Audi Sport Team Joest	(Germany) Frank Biela (Italy) Emanuele Pirro	Audi 3.6L Turbo V8	M	114
3	**LMP675**	**5**	**(United States) Dick Barbour Racing**	**(Belgium) Didier de Radiguès (Belgium) Eric van de Poele**	**Reynard 01Q**	G	**108**
3	**LMP675**	**5**	**(United States) Dick Barbour Racing**	**(Belgium) Didier de Radiguès (Belgium) Eric van de Poele**	**Judd GV675 3.4L V8**	G	**108**
4	LMP900	7	(United Kingdom) Johansson Motorsport (United Kingdom) Arena Motorsport	(Sweden) Stefan Johansson (United Kingdom) Guy Smith	Audi R8	M	105
4	LMP900	7	(United Kingdom) Johansson Motorsport (United Kingdom) Arena Motorsport	(Sweden) Stefan Johansson (United Kingdom) Guy Smith	Audi 3.6L Turbo V8	M	105
5	**GT**	**43**	**(Germany) BMW Motorsport (Germany) Team Schnitzer**	**(Sweden) Fredrik Ekblom (Germany) Dirk Müller**	**BMW M3 GTR**	M	**102**
5	**GT**	**43**	**(Germany) BMW Motorsport (Germany) Team Schnitzer**	**(Sweden) Fredrik Ekblom (Germany) Dirk Müller**	**BMW 4.0L V8**	M	**102**
6	GT	42	(Germany) BMW Motorsport (Germany) Team Schnitzer	(Finland) JJ Lehto (Germany) Jörg Müller	BMW M3 GTR	M	102
6	GT	42	(Germany) BMW Motorsport (Germany) Team Schnitzer	(Finland) JJ Lehto (Germany) Jörg Müller	BMW 4.0L V8	M	102
7	GT	22	(United States) Alex Job Racing	(United States) Randy Pobst (France) Emmanuel Collard	Porsche 911 GT3-RS	M	102
7	GT	22	(United States) Alex Job Racing	(United States) Randy Pobst (France) Emmanuel Collard	Porsche 3.6L Flat-6	M	102
8	**GTS**	**26**	**(Germany) Konrad Team Saleen**	**(Switzerland) Toni Seiler (Switzerland) Walter Brun (Austria) Franz Konrad**	**Saleen S7-R**	G	**100**
8	**GTS**	**26**	**(Germany) Konrad Team Saleen**	**(Switzerland) Toni Seiler (Switzerland) Walter Brun (Austria) Franz Konrad**	**Ford 7.0L V8**	G	**100**
9	LMP675	32	(United States) Roock-KnightHawk Racing	(United States) Mel Hawkins (South Africa) Earl Goddard (Spain) Tomás Saldaña	Lola B2K/40	A	98
9	LMP675	32	(United States) Roock-KnightHawk Racing	(United States) Mel Hawkins (South Africa) Earl Goddard (Spain) Tomás Saldaña	Nissan (AER) VQL 3.4L V6	A	98
10	GT	61	(United Kingdom) P.K. Sport	(United Kingdom) Mark Humphrey (United Kingdom) Piers Masarati	Porsche 911 GT3-RS	D	96
10	GT	61	(United Kingdom) P.K. Sport	(United Kingdom) Mark Humphrey (United Kingdom) Piers Masarati	Porsche 3.6L Flat-6	D	96
11 DNF	GT	60	(United Kingdom) P.K. Sport	(United Kingdom) Mike Youles (United Kingdom) Robin Liddell	Porsche 911 GT3-RS	D	95
11 DNF	GT	60	(United Kingdom) P.K. Sport	(United Kingdom) Mike Youles (United Kingdom) Robin Liddell	Porsche 3.6L Flat-6	D	95
12	GT	65	(Spain) Paco Orti Racing	(Spain) Jésus Diez de Villarroel (Spain) Paco Orti	Porsche 911 GT3-R	D	94
12	GT	65	(Spain) Paco Orti Racing	(Spain) Jésus Diez de Villarroel (Spain) Paco Orti	Porsche 3.6L Flat-6	D	94
13	GT	52	(Germany) Seikel Motorsport	(Canada) Tony Burgess (Morocco) Max Cohen-Olivar	Porsche 911 GT3-RS	Y	93
13	GT	52	(Germany) Seikel Motorsport	(Canada) Tony Burgess (Morocco) Max Cohen-Olivar	Porsche 3.6L Flat-6	Y	93
14	LMP900	51	(United States) Panoz Motorsports	(Germany) Klaus Graf (France) Franck Lagorce	Panoz LMP07	M	91
14	LMP900	51	(United States) Panoz Motorsports	(Germany) Klaus Graf (France) Franck Lagorce	Élan (Zytek) 4.0L V8	M	91
15	GTS	44	(Germany) Konrad Motorsport	(Portugal) Bernardo Sá Nogueira (Poland) Maciej Stanco	Porsche 911 GT2	G	87
15	GTS	44	(Germany) Konrad Motorsport	(Portugal) Bernardo Sá Nogueira (Poland) Maciej Stanco	Porsche 3.8L Turbo Flat-6	G	87
16	GT	23	(United States) Alex Job Racing	(Germany) Lucas Luhr (Germany) Sascha Maassen	Porsche 911 GT3-RS	M	83
16	GT	23	(United States) Alex Job Racing	(Germany) Lucas Luhr (Germany) Sascha Maassen	Porsche 3.6L Flat-6	M	83
17 DNF	GT	66	(United Kingdom) Harlow Motorsport	(United Kingdom) Terry Rymer (South Africa) Stephen Watson	Porsche 911 GT3-R	D	77
17 DNF	GT	66	(United Kingdom) Harlow Motorsport	(United Kingdom) Terry Rymer (South Africa) Stephen Watson	Porsche 3.6L Flat-6	D	77
18	GT	64	(United Kingdom) Sebah Automotive, Ltd.	(United Kingdom) Hugh Hayden (United States) Stephen Earle	Porsche 911 GT3-R	A	74
18	GT	64	(United Kingdom) Sebah Automotive, Ltd.	(United Kingdom) Hugh Hayden (United States) Stephen Earle	Porsche 3.6L Flat-6	A	74
19 DNF	GTS	41	(United Kingdom) Ray Mallock Ltd. (RML)	(Belgium) Bruno Lambert (United Kingdom) Ian McKellar Jr.	Saleen S7-R	D	30
19 DNF	GTS	41	(United Kingdom) Ray Mallock Ltd. (RML)	(Belgium) Bruno Lambert (United Kingdom) Ian McKellar Jr.	Ford 7.0L V8	D	30
20 DNF	LMP900	50	(United States) Panoz Motorsports	(Denmark) Jan Magnussen (Australia) David Brabham	Panoz LMP07	M	30
20 DNF	LMP900	50	(United States) Panoz Motorsports	(Denmark) Jan Magnussen (Australia) David Brabham	Élan (Zytek) 4.0L V8	M	30
21 DNF	LMP675	57	(United States) Dick Barbour Racing	(Canada) John Graham (Venezuela) Milka Duno	Reynard 01Q	G	5
21 DNF	LMP675	57	(United States) Dick Barbour Racing	(Canada) John Graham (Venezuela) Milka Duno	Judd GV675 3.4L V8	G	5

== Statistics ==
- Pole Position – #1 Audi Sport Team Joest – 1:22.285
- Fastest Lap – #2 Audi Sport Team Joest – 1:23.035
- Distance – 438.9 km
- Average Speed – 158.506 km/h

European Le Mans Series
Previous race: 2001 ELMS at Donington Park	2001 season	Next race: 2001 1000km of Estoril

American Le Mans Series
Previous race: 2001 ELMS at Donington Park	2001 season	Next race: 2001 Grand Prix of Sonoma
