= 2002 American Le Mans at Mid-Ohio =

The layout of Mid-Ohio Sports Car Course

The 2002 American Le Mans at Mid-Ohio was the third round of the 2002 American Le Mans Series season. It took place at Mid-Ohio Sports Car Course, Ohio, on June 30, 2002.

== Official results ==
Class winners in bold.

Pos	Class	No	Team	Drivers	Chassis	Tyre	Laps
Pos	Class	No	Team	Drivers	Engine	Tyre	Laps
1	**LMP900**	**1**	**(Germany) Audi Sport North America**	**(Italy) Emanuele Pirro (Germany) Frank Biela**	**Audi R8**	MI	**111**
1	**LMP900**	**1**	**(Germany) Audi Sport North America**	**(Italy) Emanuele Pirro (Germany) Frank Biela**	**Audi 3.6L Turbo V8**	MI	**111**
2	LMP900	2	(Germany) Audi Sport North America	(Denmark) Tom Kristensen (Italy) Rinaldo Capello	Audi R8	MI	111
2	LMP900	2	(Germany) Audi Sport North America	(Denmark) Tom Kristensen (Italy) Rinaldo Capello	Audi 3.6L Turbo V8	MI	111
3	LMP900	50	(United States) Panoz Motor Sports	(Australia) David Brabham (Denmark) Jan Magnussen	Panoz LMP01 Evo	MI	111
3	LMP900	50	(United States) Panoz Motor Sports	(Australia) David Brabham (Denmark) Jan Magnussen	Élan 6L8 6.0L V8	MI	111
4	LMP900	51	(United States) Panoz Motor Sports	(United States) Bryan Herta (United States) Bill Auberlen	Panoz LMP01 Evo	MI	111
4	LMP900	51	(United States) Panoz Motor Sports	(United States) Bryan Herta (United States) Bill Auberlen	Élan 6L8 6.0L V8	MI	111
5	LMP900	16	(United States) Dyson Racing Team	(United States) Butch Leitzinger (United Kingdom) James Weaver	Riley & Scott Mk III	G	109
5	LMP900	16	(United States) Dyson Racing Team	(United States) Butch Leitzinger (United Kingdom) James Weaver	Lincoln (Élan) 6.0L V8	G	109
6	**GTS**	**3**	**(United States) Corvette Racing**	**(Canada) Ron Fellows (United States) Johnny O'Connell**	**Chevrolet Corvette C5-R**	G	**106**
6	**GTS**	**3**	**(United States) Corvette Racing**	**(Canada) Ron Fellows (United States) Johnny O'Connell**	**Chevrolet 7.0L V8**	G	**106**
7	GTS	4	(United States) Corvette Racing	(United States) Andy Pilgrim (United States) Kelly Collins	Chevrolet Corvette C5-R	G	105
7	GTS	4	(United States) Corvette Racing	(United States) Andy Pilgrim (United States) Kelly Collins	Chevrolet 7.0L V8	G	105
8	LMP900	17	(United States) MBD Sportscar	(Canada) Scott Maxwell (Venezuela) Milka Duno	Panoz LMP07	G	104
8	LMP900	17	(United States) MBD Sportscar	(Canada) Scott Maxwell (Venezuela) Milka Duno	Mugen MF408S 4.0L V8	G	104
9	LMP900	30	(United States) Intersport	(United States) John Field (United States) Mark Neuhaus	Lola B2K/10B	G	103
9	LMP900	30	(United States) Intersport	(United States) John Field (United States) Mark Neuhaus	Judd GV4 4.0L V10	G	103
10	LMP900	38	(United States) Champion Racing	(United Kingdom) Johnny Herbert (Sweden) Stefan Johansson	Audi R8	MI	102
10	LMP900	38	(United States) Champion Racing	(United Kingdom) Johnny Herbert (Sweden) Stefan Johansson	Audi 3.6L Turbo V8	MI	102
11	**GT**	**66**	**(United States) The Racer's Group**	**(United States) Kevin Buckler (United States) B.J. Zacharias**	**Porsche 911 GT3-RS**	MI	**101**
11	**GT**	**66**	**(United States) The Racer's Group**	**(United States) Kevin Buckler (United States) B.J. Zacharias**	**Porsche 3.6L Flat-6**	MI	**101**
12	GT	22	(United States) Alex Job Racing	(Germany) Timo Bernhard (Germany) Jörg Bergmeister	Porsche 911 GT3-RS	MI	101
12	GT	22	(United States) Alex Job Racing	(Germany) Timo Bernhard (Germany) Jörg Bergmeister	Porsche 3.6L Flat-6	MI	101
13	**LMP675**	**56**	**(United States) Team Bucknum Racing**	**(United States) Jeff Bucknum (United States) Chris McMurry (United States) Bryan Willman**	**Pilbeam MP84**	A	**100**
13	**LMP675**	**56**	**(United States) Team Bucknum Racing**	**(United States) Jeff Bucknum (United States) Chris McMurry (United States) Bryan Willman**	**Nissan (AER) VQL 3.4L V6**	A	**100**
14	LMP675	13	(United States) Archangel Motorsports	(United States) Bret Arsenault (United Kingdom) Ben Devlin	Lola B2K/40	D	99
14	LMP675	13	(United States) Archangel Motorsports	(United States) Bret Arsenault (United Kingdom) Ben Devlin	Ford (Millington) 2.0L Turbo I4	D	99
15	LMP675	11	(United States) KnightHawk Racing	(United States) John Fergus (United States) Steven Knight	Lola B2K/40	A	99
15	LMP675	11	(United States) KnightHawk Racing	(United States) John Fergus (United States) Steven Knight	Nissan (AER) VQL 3.0L V6	A	99
16	GT	79	(United States) J-3 Racing	(United States) Justin Jackson (United States) Mike Fitzgerald	Porsche 911 GT3-RS	D	99
16	GT	79	(United States) J-3 Racing	(United States) Justin Jackson (United States) Mike Fitzgerald	Porsche 3.6L Flat-6	D	99
17	GT	99	(United States) Schumacher Racing	(United States) Larry Schumacher (United States) David Murry	Porsche 911 GT3-RS	D	98
17	GT	99	(United States) Schumacher Racing	(United States) Larry Schumacher (United States) David Murry	Porsche 3.6L Flat-6	D	98
18	LMP900	18	(United States) MBD Sportscar	(Canada) John Graham (Belgium) Didier de Radigues	Panoz LMP07	G	97
18	LMP900	18	(United States) MBD Sportscar	(Canada) John Graham (Belgium) Didier de Radigues	Mugen MF408S 4.0L V8	G	97
19	GT	89	(Canada) Porschehaus Racing	(Canada) Robert Julien (United States) Adam Merzon	Porsche 911 GT3-RS	D	96
19	GT	89	(Canada) Porschehaus Racing	(Canada) Robert Julien (United States) Adam Merzon	Porsche 3.6L Flat-6	D	96
20	GT	43	(United States) Orbit	(United States) Leo Hindery (United States) Peter Baron	Porsche 911 GT3-RS	MI	95
20	GT	43	(United States) Orbit	(United States) Leo Hindery (United States) Peter Baron	Porsche 3.6L Flat-6	MI	95
21	GT	42	(United States) Orbit	(United States) Joe Policastro Jr. (United States) Tony Kester	Porsche 911 GT3-RS	MI	93
21	GT	42	(United States) Orbit	(United States) Joe Policastro Jr. (United States) Tony Kester	Porsche 3.6L Flat-6	MI	93
22	LMP675	37	(United States) Intersport	(United States) Jon Field (United States) Clint Field	MG-Lola EX257	G	93
22	LMP675	37	(United States) Intersport	(United States) Jon Field (United States) Clint Field	MG (AER) XP20 2.0L Turbo I4	G	93
23	GTS	44	(United States) American Viperacing	(United States) Marc Bunting (United States) Tom Weickardt	Dodge Viper GTS-R	P	88
23	GTS	44	(United States) American Viperacing	(United States) Marc Bunting (United States) Tom Weickardt	Dodge 8.0L V10	P	88
24 DNF	LMP675	77	(United States) AB Motorsport	(United States) Jimmy Adams (United States) Joe Blacker	Pilbeam MP84	A	87
24 DNF	LMP675	77	(United States) AB Motorsport	(United States) Jimmy Adams (United States) Joe Blacker	Nissan (AER) VQL 3.0L V6	A	87
25	GTS	26	(Germany) Konrad Motorsport	(Austria) Franz Konrad (United States) Terry Borcheller	Saleen S7-R	P	81
25	GTS	26	(Germany) Konrad Motorsport	(Austria) Franz Konrad (United States) Terry Borcheller	Ford 7.0L V8	P	81
26 DNF	GT	31	(United States) Petersen Motorsports	(United States) Randy Pobst (United Kingdom) Johnny Mowlem	Porsche 911 GT3-RS	Y	78
26 DNF	GT	31	(United States) Petersen Motorsports	(United States) Randy Pobst (United Kingdom) Johnny Mowlem	Porsche 3.6L Flat-6	Y	78
27 DNF	GT	23	(United States) Alex Job Racing	(Germany) Sascha Maassen (Germany) Lucas Luhr	Porsche 911 GT3-RS	MI	77
27 DNF	GT	23	(United States) Alex Job Racing	(Germany) Sascha Maassen (Germany) Lucas Luhr	Porsche 3.6L Flat-6	MI	77
28 DNF	GTS	0	(Italy) Team Olive Garden	(Italy) Mimmo Schiattarella (Italy) Emanuele Naspetti	Ferrari 550 Maranello	MI	73
28 DNF	GTS	0	(Italy) Team Olive Garden	(Italy) Mimmo Schiattarella (Italy) Emanuele Naspetti	Ferrari 6.0L V12	MI	73
29 DNF	GTS	45	(United States) American Viperacing	(United States) Shane Lewis (United States) Kevin Allen	Dodge Viper GTS-R	P	62
29 DNF	GTS	45	(United States) American Viperacing	(United States) Shane Lewis (United States) Kevin Allen	Dodge 8.0L V10	P	62
30 DNF	LMP675	62	(United States) Team Spencer Motorsports	(United States) Dennis Spencer (United States) Rich Grupp	Lola B2K/42	A	15
30 DNF	LMP675	62	(United States) Team Spencer Motorsports	(United States) Dennis Spencer (United States) Rich Grupp	Mazda 1.3L 2-Rotor	A	15

== Statistics ==
- Pole Position - #1 Audi Sport North America - 1:14.169
- Fastest Lap - #2 Audi Sport North America - 1:14.815
- Distance - 403.363 km
- Average Speed - 146.380 km/h

American Le Mans Series
Previous race: 2002 Grand Prix of Sonoma	2002 season	Next race: 2002 Road America 500
