= Owen Trinkler =

American racing driver (born 1976)

- Nationality: American
- Born: May 19, 1976 (age 50) Nashville, Tennessee, U.S.
- Championships: 2018 IMSA Continental Tire SportsCar Challenge – Grand Sport

Owen Trinkler (born 19 May 1976) is an American professional sports car racing driver and driving instructor. He won the 2018 Grand Sport (GS) class championship of the IMSA Continental Tire SportsCar Challenge with co-driver Hugh Plumb for Team TGM, and holds the record for the most starts in the series' history.

== Early life ==
Trinkler is from Nashville, Tennessee. A second-generation racing driver who followed his father into the sport, he began racing at the age of ten.

== Racing career ==
=== Early career and Grand-Am ===
Trinkler began his professional career in the mid-1990s in sports car racing in what later became the WeatherTech SportsCar Championship. Over the following years he drove for teams including Power Racing, ACP Motorsports, Dick Greer Racing and Team Spencer Motorsports in the Grand-Am Rolex Sports Car Series and its support series, in cars ranging from the BMW M3 and Acura Integra to the Chevrolet Corvette, Porsche 911 GT3 Cup and Mazda RX-8. He is a race winner in both the Rolex Series and the Grand-Am Continental Tire Sports Car Challenge, and competed in the 24 Hours of Daytona, including in 2011 with Team Spencer's Mazda RX-8.

=== RSR Motorsports ===
Trinkler was a mainstay of the MINI-based RSR Motorsports team in the Street Tuner (ST) class of the Grand-Am KONI Challenge and Continental Tire Sports Car Challenge from the late 2000s, serving as development driver, driver coach and, from 2010, team manager. In 2008 he took pole position for the KONI Challenge Street Tuner race at Mid-Ohio Sports Car Course.

In 2010, co-driving with team owner Randall Smalley, he won the Garden State 250 at New Jersey Motorsports Park, the first series victory for the MINI Cooper, and followed it with a second consecutive win at the Grand Prix de Trois-Rivières, a race he had lost the previous year from the lead when his seat broke during a driver change. He later drove RSR's Honda Civic Si, winning again at New Jersey Motorsports Park in 2012 with Corey Fergus.

=== CRG Racing ===
With CRG Racing, Trinkler and co-driver Sarah Cattaneo won two races in the ST class in 2016, at Sebring and Canadian Tire Motorsport Park, in a Nissan Altima. In 2017 he finished as runner-up in the ST championship with two wins.

=== Team TGM and 2018 championship ===
For 2018 Trinkler joined Team TGM, owned by Ted Giovanis, to drive a Mercedes-AMG GT4 in the Grand Sport class, marking his return to GS competition for the first time since 2007. Paired with Hugh Plumb in the No. 46 car, he took the team's first victory at Lime Rock Park and added wins including at Virginia International Raceway, securing the 2018 GS drivers' and teams' championships. The titles were the first for both the team and the Mercedes-AMG GT4 in North America, and the No. 46 car completed all 776 laps of the season, the only full-time GS entry to do so.

In 2019, the series' first season as the Michelin Pilot Challenge, Trinkler took pole position at the season-opening Sebring round, the fifth pole of his career, in his 151st series start. He added further poles at Canadian Tire Motorsport Park and Lime Rock Park, and won again at Lime Rock with Plumb, the pair finishing third in the championship. The Lime Rock win earned the pair the fan-voted Forgeline Spirit of the Race Award.

He later drove a Porsche 718 Cayman GT4 RS Clubsport for Team TGM alongside Giovanis. By 2022 he had made 172 starts in the series, the most in its history.

== Other activities ==
Trinkler works as a driving instructor and coach, including at the Porsche Driving Experience and the Panoz Racing School, and much of his coaching has taken place at Barber Motorsports Park. He is a member of the Road Racing Drivers Club.
