= Jimmy Adams (racing driver) =

American race car driver

Jimmy Adams (born June 27, 1972) is an American race car driver.

Jimmy Adams successfully competed in professional and club racing between 1995 and 2005.

Adams won the 1997 Pikes Peak International Hill Climb in the Legends Class, setting a new race record and qualifying record. In 1998, Adams again campaigned a Legends Car in the Pikes Peak International Hill Climb, and finished in second place. He drove a Dodge Viper GTS in the T1 Class of the 1999 SCCA National Series. Adams won multiple SCCA T1 National races, including Road Atlanta, Daytona, and Pocono, and he qualified on the front row for the 1999 SCCA Runoffs at Mid Ohio Sports Car Course. In 1999, Adams raced a Dodge Viper GTS in the Pikes Peak International Hill Climb, finishing 4th in the High Performance Showroom Stock class.

In 2000, Adams drove a Dodge Viper GTS for Viper Speed Racing of Fort Worth, TX in SCCA Pro Racing's World Challenge GT Series. Adams returned to the Pikes Peak Hill Climb in 2000 in the Super Stock Car class, and finished 6th driving a purpose-built Chevrolet Super Stock Car.

In 2001, Adams drove a Porsche GT3 Cup for Southern Comfort Racing (SCR) in the SCCA Pro Racing World Challenge GT Series, scoring a number of podium finishes, including Lime Rock Park and Laguna Seca. Also in 2001, Adams claimed the Pro class victory in the Legends Cars Road Course World Finals at Sears Point Raceway in Sonoma, CA. He drove one race in the 2001 American Le Mans Series for SCR-Pilbeam, returning in 2002 to drive part of the season for AB Motorsport-Pilbeam. Adams contested a number of American Le Mans Series races in 2002 for AB Motorsport in the Nissan powered Pilbeam MP-84, and earned several LMP675 class podium finishes, including the Road America 500 and Miami's Grand Prix of the Americas.

In 2002 Adams again contested the Legends Cars Road Course World Finals at Sears Point Raceway in Sonoma, CA, where he was the fastest qualifier and finished in the runner up position for the Pro class. Jimmy Adams returned to the SCCA Pro Racing World Challenge GT Series in 2003 in a Porsche 911 GT3 Cup car.

In 2004, Adams co-drove a Porsche 911 GT3 Cup car to victory in the Valentine's 300 at Virginia International Raceway (VIR). Adams again co-drove a Porsche 911 GT3 Cup to victory in the 2005 Valentine's 300 at Virginia International Raceway (VIR).
