= 2001 Grand Prix of Sonoma =

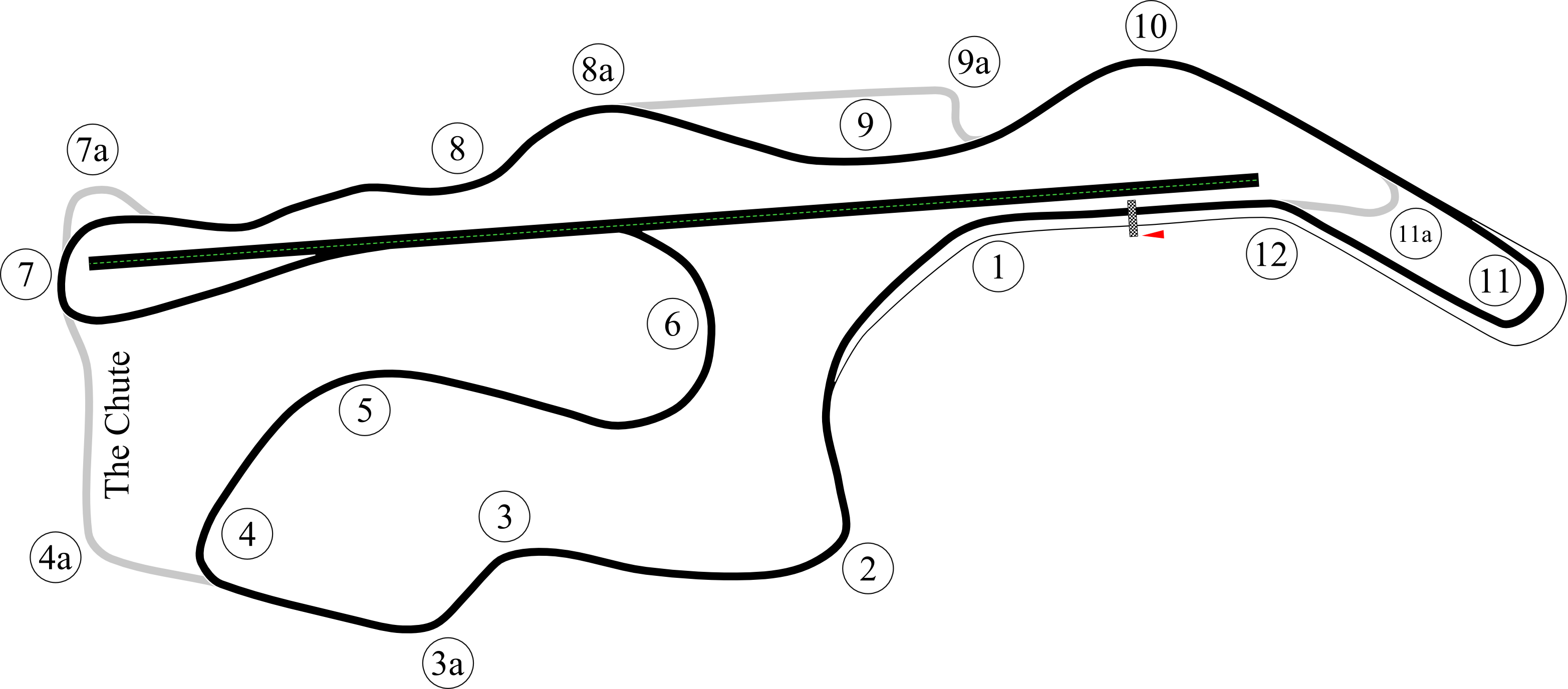
Sonoma Raceway

The 2001 X-Factor Grand Prix of Sonoma was the fifth round of the 2001 American Le Mans Series season. It took place at Infineon Raceway, California, on July 22, 2001.

== Official results ==
Class winners in bold.

Pos	Class	No	Team	Drivers	Chassis	Tyre	Laps
Pos	Class	No	Team	Drivers	Engine	Tyre	Laps
1	**LMP900**	**1**	**(Germany) Audi Sport North America**	**(Italy) Rinaldo Capello (Denmark) Tom Kristensen**	**Audi R8**	M	**107**
1	**LMP900**	**1**	**(Germany) Audi Sport North America**	**(Italy) Rinaldo Capello (Denmark) Tom Kristensen**	**Audi 3.6L Turbo V8**	M	**107**
2	LMP900	2	(Germany) Audi Sport North America	(Germany) Frank Biela (Italy) Emanuele Pirro	Audi R8	M	107
2	LMP900	2	(Germany) Audi Sport North America	(Germany) Frank Biela (Italy) Emanuele Pirro	Audi 3.6L Turbo V8	M	107
3	LMP900	50	(United States) Panoz Motor Sports	(Denmark) Jan Magnussen (Australia) David Brabham	Panoz LMP-1 Roadster-S	M	106
3	LMP900	50	(United States) Panoz Motor Sports	(Denmark) Jan Magnussen (Australia) David Brabham	Élan 6L8 6.0L V8	M	106
4	LMP900	38	(United States) Champion Racing	(United Kingdom) Andy Wallace (United Kingdom) Johnny Herbert	Audi R8	M	106
4	LMP900	38	(United States) Champion Racing	(United Kingdom) Andy Wallace (United Kingdom) Johnny Herbert	Audi 3.6L Turbo V8	M	106
5	**GTS**	**3**	**(United States) Corvette Racing**	**(Canada) Ron Fellows (United States) Johnny O'Connell**	**Chevrolet Corvette C5-R**	G	**97**
5	**GTS**	**3**	**(United States) Corvette Racing**	**(Canada) Ron Fellows (United States) Johnny O'Connell**	**Chevrolet 7.0L V8**	G	**97**
6	GTS	4	(United States) Corvette Racing	(United States) Andy Pilgrim (United States) Kelly Collins	Chevrolet Corvette C5-R	G	97
6	GTS	4	(United States) Corvette Racing	(United States) Andy Pilgrim (United States) Kelly Collins	Chevrolet 7.0L V8	G	97
7	**GT**	**42**	**(Germany) BMW Motorsport (Germany) Schnitzer Motorsport**	**(Germany) Jörg Müller (Finland) JJ Lehto**	**BMW M3 GTR**	M	**97**
7	**GT**	**42**	**(Germany) BMW Motorsport (Germany) Schnitzer Motorsport**	**(Germany) Jörg Müller (Finland) JJ Lehto**	**BMW 4.0L V8**	M	**97**
8	GT	6	(United States) Prototype Technology Group	(United States) Boris Said (Germany) Hans-Joachim Stuck	BMW M3 GTR	Y	96
8	GT	6	(United States) Prototype Technology Group	(United States) Boris Said (Germany) Hans-Joachim Stuck	BMW 4.0L V8	Y	96
9	GT	43	(Germany) BMW Motorsport (Germany) Schnitzer Motorsport	(Germany) Dirk Müller (Sweden) Fredrik Ekblom	BMW M3 GTR	M	96
9	GT	43	(Germany) BMW Motorsport (Germany) Schnitzer Motorsport	(Germany) Dirk Müller (Sweden) Fredrik Ekblom	BMW 4.0L V8	M	96
10	GT	10	(United States) Prototype Technology Group	(United States) Bill Auberlen (Sweden) Niclas Jönsson	BMW M3 GTR	Y	96
10	GT	10	(United States) Prototype Technology Group	(United States) Bill Auberlen (Sweden) Niclas Jönsson	BMW 4.0L V8	Y	96
11	GT	23	(United States) Alex Job Racing	(Germany) Lucas Luhr (Germany) Sascha Maassen	Porsche 911 GT3-RS	M	95
11	GT	23	(United States) Alex Job Racing	(Germany) Lucas Luhr (Germany) Sascha Maassen	Porsche 3.6L Flat-6	M	95
12	LMP900	7	(United States) Team Cadillac	(France) Christophe Tinseau (France) Emmanuel Collard	Cadillac Northstar LMP01	M	95
12	LMP900	7	(United States) Team Cadillac	(France) Christophe Tinseau (France) Emmanuel Collard	Cadillac Northstar 4.0L Turbo V8	M	95
13	**LMP675**	**57**	**(United States) Dick Barbour Racing**	**(Venezuela) Milka Duno (Belgium) Didier de Radigues (Canada) John Graham**	**Reynard 01Q**	G	**95**
13	**LMP675**	**57**	**(United States) Dick Barbour Racing**	**(Venezuela) Milka Duno (Belgium) Didier de Radigues (Canada) John Graham**	**Judd GV675 3.4L V8**	G	**95**
14	GT	30	(United States) Petersen Motorsports	(United Kingdom) Johnny Mowlem (Germany) Timo Bernhard	Porsche 911 GT3-R	M	95
14	GT	30	(United States) Petersen Motorsports	(United Kingdom) Johnny Mowlem (Germany) Timo Bernhard	Porsche 3.6L Flat-6	M	95
15	LMP900	37	(United States) Intersport	(United States) John Field (United States) Rick Sutherland	Lola B2K/10	G	95
15	LMP900	37	(United States) Intersport	(United States) John Field (United States) Rick Sutherland	Judd GV4 4.0L V10	G	95
16	GTS	26	(Germany) Konrad Team Saleen	(United States) Terry Borcheller (Austria) Franz Konrad	Saleen S7-R	G	95
16	GTS	26	(Germany) Konrad Team Saleen	(United States) Terry Borcheller (Austria) Franz Konrad	Ford 7.0L V8	G	95
17	GT	66	(United States) The Racer's Group	(United States) Kevin Buckler (United States) Tyler McQuarrie	Porsche 911 GT3-RS	Y	94
17	GT	66	(United States) The Racer's Group	(United States) Kevin Buckler (United States) Tyler McQuarrie	Porsche 3.6L Flat-6	Y	94
18	GTS	45	(United States) American Viperacing	(United States) Shane Lewis (United States) Jeff Altenburg	Dodge Viper GTS-R	D	94
18	GTS	45	(United States) American Viperacing	(United States) Shane Lewis (United States) Jeff Altenburg	Dodge 8.0L V10	D	94
19	GT	67	(United States) The Racer's Group	(United States) Vic Rice (United States) Robert Orcutt	Porsche 911 GT3-R	Y	92
19	GT	67	(United States) The Racer's Group	(United States) Vic Rice (United States) Robert Orcutt	Porsche 3.6L Flat-6	Y	92
20	GT	52	(Germany) Seikel Motorsport	(Canada) Tony Burgess (United States) Philip Collin	Porsche 911 GT3-RS	Y	88
20	GT	52	(Germany) Seikel Motorsport	(Canada) Tony Burgess (United States) Philip Collin	Porsche 3.6L Flat-6	Y	88
21	GTS	44	(United States) American Viperacing	(United States) Tom Weickardt (United States) Gene Martindale	Dodge Viper GTS-R	D	86
21	GTS	44	(United States) American Viperacing	(United States) Tom Weickardt (United States) Gene Martindale	Dodge 8.0L V10	D	86
22	GT	15	(United States) Dick Barbour Racing	(United States) Dave McEntee (United States) Grady Willingham (Mexico) Randy Wars	Porsche 911 GT3-R	D	84
22	GT	15	(United States) Dick Barbour Racing	(United States) Dave McEntee (United States) Grady Willingham (Mexico) Randy Wars	Porsche 3.6L Flat-6	D	84
23 DNF	GT	22	(United States) Alex Job Racing	(United States) Randy Pobst (Germany) Christian Menzel	Porsche 911 GT3-RS	M	82
23 DNF	GT	22	(United States) Alex Job Racing	(United States) Randy Pobst (Germany) Christian Menzel	Porsche 3.6L Flat-6	M	82
24 DNF	LMP900	8	(United States) Team Cadillac	(South Africa) Wayne Taylor (Italy) Max Angelelli	Cadillac Northstar LMP01	M	52
24 DNF	LMP900	8	(United States) Team Cadillac	(South Africa) Wayne Taylor (Italy) Max Angelelli	Cadillac Northstar 4.0L Turbo V8	M	52
25 DNF	GT	69	(Canada) Kyser Racing	(Canada) Jeffrey Pabst (Canada) Kye Wankum (United States) Joe Foster	Porsche 911 GT3-R	D	31
25 DNF	GT	69	(Canada) Kyser Racing	(Canada) Jeffrey Pabst (Canada) Kye Wankum (United States) Joe Foster	Porsche 3.6L Flat-6	D	31
26 DNF	LMP900	51	(United States) Panoz Motor Sports	(Germany) Klaus Graf (France) Franck Lagorce	Panoz LMP-1 Roadster-S	M	18
26 DNF	LMP900	51	(United States) Panoz Motor Sports	(Germany) Klaus Graf (France) Franck Lagorce	Élan 6L8 6.0L V8	M	18

== Statistics ==
- Pole Position - #1 Audi Sport North America - 1:21.745
- Fastest Lap - #2 Audi Sport North America - 1:23.000
- Distance - 433.944 km
- Average Speed - 157.465 km/h

American Le Mans Series
Previous race: 2001 ELMS at Jarama	2001 season	Next race: 2001 Grand Prix of Portland
