= 2002 12 Hours of Sebring =

Sports car endurance race

Track map of the Sebring International Raceway

The 2002 Mobil 1 12 Hours of Sebring was the 50th running of this event, and the opening round of the 2002 American Le Mans Series season. It took place at Sebring International Raceway, Florida, on March 16, 2002.

== Official results ==
Class winners in bold.

Pos	Class	No	Teamw	Drivers	Chassis	Tyre	Laps
Pos	Class	No	Teamw	Drivers	Engine	Tyre	Laps
1	**LMP900**	**2**	**(Germany) Audi Sport North America**	**(United Kingdom) Johnny Herbert (Italy) Christian Pescatori (Italy) Rinaldo Capello**	**Audi R8**	M	**346**
1	**LMP900**	**2**	**(Germany) Audi Sport North America**	**(United Kingdom) Johnny Herbert (Italy) Christian Pescatori (Italy) Rinaldo Capello**	**Audi 3.6 L Turbo V8**	M	**346**
2	LMP900	38	(United States) Champion Racing	(United Kingdom) Andy Wallace (Sweden) Stefan Johansson (Netherlands) Jan Lammers	Audi R8	M	345
2	LMP900	38	(United States) Champion Racing	(United Kingdom) Andy Wallace (Sweden) Stefan Johansson (Netherlands) Jan Lammers	Audi 3.6 L Turbo V8	M	345
3	LMP900	36	(United States) Riley & Scott Racing (United States) Jim Matthews Racing	(United States) Jim Matthews (Belgium) Marc Goossens (United Kingdom) Guy Smith	Riley & Scott Mk III C	G	337
3	LMP900	36	(United States) Riley & Scott Racing (United States) Jim Matthews Racing	(United States) Jim Matthews (Belgium) Marc Goossens (United Kingdom) Guy Smith	Élan 6L8 6.0 L V8	G	337
4	LMP900	16	(United States) Dyson Racing Team	(United States) Butch Leitzinger (United States) Elliott Forbes-Robinson (United Kingdom) James Weaver	Riley & Scott Mk III	G	330
4	LMP900	16	(United States) Dyson Racing Team	(United States) Butch Leitzinger (United States) Elliott Forbes-Robinson (United Kingdom) James Weaver	Lincoln (Élan) 6.0 L V8	G	330
5	LMP900	1	(Germany) Audi Sport North America	(Denmark) Tom Kristensen (Italy) Emanuele Pirro (Germany) Frank Biela	Audi R8	M	327
5	LMP900	1	(Germany) Audi Sport North America	(Denmark) Tom Kristensen (Italy) Emanuele Pirro (Germany) Frank Biela	Audi 3.6 L Turbo V8	M	327
6	LMP900	21	(United Kingdom) Team Ascari	(United Kingdom) Christian Vann (United Kingdom) Ben Collins (United Kingdom) Justin Wilson	Ascari KZR-1	G	323
6	LMP900	21	(United Kingdom) Team Ascari	(United Kingdom) Christian Vann (United Kingdom) Ben Collins (United Kingdom) Justin Wilson	Judd GV4 4.0 L V10	G	323
7	**LMP675**	**37**	**(United States) Intersport Racing**	**(United States) Jon Field (United States) Duncan Dayton (United States) Mike Durand**	**MG-Lola EX257**	A	**323**
7	**LMP675**	**37**	**(United States) Intersport Racing**	**(United States) Jon Field (United States) Duncan Dayton (United States) Mike Durand**	**MG (AER) XP20 2.0 L Turbo I4**	A	**323**
8	LMP900	51	(United States) Panoz Motor Sports	(United States) Bryan Herta (United States) Bill Auberlen (United States) David Donohue	Panoz LMP01 Evo	M	319
8	LMP900	51	(United States) Panoz Motor Sports	(United States) Bryan Herta (United States) Bill Auberlen (United States) David Donohue	Élan 6L8 6.0 L V8	M	319
9	**GTS**	**3**	**(United States) Corvette Racing**	**(Canada) Ron Fellows (United States) Johnny O'Connell (United Kingdom) Oliver Gavin**	**Chevrolet Corvette C5-R**	G	**317**
9	**GTS**	**3**	**(United States) Corvette Racing**	**(Canada) Ron Fellows (United States) Johnny O'Connell (United Kingdom) Oliver Gavin**	**Chevrolet 7.0 L V8**	G	**317**
10	GTS	26	(Germany) Konrad Motorsport	(Austria) Franz Konrad (United States) Terry Borcheller (Switzerland) Toni Seiler	Saleen S7-R	P	309
10	GTS	26	(Germany) Konrad Motorsport	(Austria) Franz Konrad (United States) Terry Borcheller (Switzerland) Toni Seiler	Ford 7.0 L V8	P	309
11	GTS	86	(France) Larbre Compétition Chereau	(France) Christophe Bouchut (Belgium) Vincent Vosse	Chrysler Viper GTS-R	M	309
11	GTS	86	(France) Larbre Compétition Chereau	(France) Christophe Bouchut (Belgium) Vincent Vosse	Chrysler 8.0 L V10	M	309
12	**GT**	**23**	**(United States) Alex Job Racing**	**(Germany) Sascha Maassen (Germany) Lucas Luhr**	**Porsche 911 GT3-RS**	M	**306**
12	**GT**	**23**	**(United States) Alex Job Racing**	**(Germany) Sascha Maassen (Germany) Lucas Luhr**	**Porsche 3.6 L Flat-6**	M	**306**
13	GTS	4	(United States) Corvette Racing	(United States) Andy Pilgrim (United States) Kelly Collins (France) Franck Fréon	Chevrolet Corvette C5-R	G	306
13	GTS	4	(United States) Corvette Racing	(United States) Andy Pilgrim (United States) Kelly Collins (France) Franck Fréon	Chevrolet 7.0 L V8	G	306
14	GT	52	(Germany) Seikel Motorsport	(United States) Hugh Plumb (United States) Philip Collin (New Zealand) Andrew Bagnall	Porsche 911 GT3-RS	Y	295
14	GT	52	(Germany) Seikel Motorsport	(United States) Hugh Plumb (United States) Philip Collin (New Zealand) Andrew Bagnall	Porsche 3.6 L Flat-6	Y	295
15	GT	60	(United Kingdom) P.K. Sport	(United Kingdom) Robin Liddell (Italy) Fabio Babini (Italy) Giovanni Anapoli	Porsche 911 GT3-RS	P	295
15	GT	60	(United Kingdom) P.K. Sport	(United Kingdom) Robin Liddell (Italy) Fabio Babini (Italy) Giovanni Anapoli	Porsche 3.6 L Flat-6	P	295
16	GT	67	(United States) The Racer's Group	(United States) Larry Schumacher (United States) Robert Nagel (United States) Jim Pace	Porsche 911 GT3-RS	M	295
16	GT	67	(United States) The Racer's Group	(United States) Larry Schumacher (United States) Robert Nagel (United States) Jim Pace	Porsche 3.6 L Flat-6	M	295
17	GT	61	(United Kingdom) P.K. Sport	(United Kingdom) Piers Masarati (United Kingdom) Basil Demeroutis (United States) Keith Alexander	Porsche 911 GT3-R	P	291
17	GT	61	(United Kingdom) P.K. Sport	(United Kingdom) Piers Masarati (United Kingdom) Basil Demeroutis (United States) Keith Alexander	Porsche 3.6 L Flat-6	P	291
18	GTS	45	(United States) American Viperacing	(United States) Shane Lewis (United States) Norman Goldrich (United States) Rick Fairbanks	Dodge Viper GTS-R	P	289
18	GTS	45	(United States) American Viperacing	(United States) Shane Lewis (United States) Norman Goldrich (United States) Rick Fairbanks	Dodge 8.0 L V10	P	289
19	GT	43	(United States) Orbit	(United States) Leo Hindery (United States) Peter Baron (United States) Mike Borkowski	Porsche 911 GT3-RS	M	287
19	GT	43	(United States) Orbit	(United States) Leo Hindery (United States) Peter Baron (United States) Mike Borkowski	Porsche 3.6 L Flat-6	M	287
20	GT	85	(France) 917 Racing Team (France) Larbre Compétition	(France) Hervé Clément (France) Bernard Simmenauer (Germany) André Ahrlé	Porsche 911 GT3-RS	M	286
20	GT	85	(France) 917 Racing Team (France) Larbre Compétition	(France) Hervé Clément (France) Bernard Simmenauer (Germany) André Ahrlé	Porsche 3.6 L Flat-6	M	286
21	GT	53	(Germany) Seikel Motorsport	(Italy) Alex Caffi (Italy) Luca Riccitelli (Italy) Gabrio Rosa	Porsche 911 GT3-RS	Y	285
21	GT	53	(Germany) Seikel Motorsport	(Italy) Alex Caffi (Italy) Luca Riccitelli (Italy) Gabrio Rosa	Porsche 3.6 L Flat-6	Y	285
22 DNF	GT	22	(United States) Alex Job Racing	(Germany) Timo Bernhard (Germany) Jörg Bergmeister (Germany) Marc Lieb	Porsche 911 GT3-RS	M	277
22 DNF	GT	22	(United States) Alex Job Racing	(Germany) Timo Bernhard (Germany) Jörg Bergmeister (Germany) Marc Lieb	Porsche 3.6 L Flat-6	M	277
23	GT	58	(Germany) Freisinger Motorsport	(United States) Chip Vance (United States) Stephen Southard (France) Georges Forgeois	Porsche 911 GT3-RS	D	275
23	GT	58	(Germany) Freisinger Motorsport	(United States) Chip Vance (United States) Stephen Southard (France) Georges Forgeois	Porsche 3.6 L Flat-6	D	275
24	LMP900	20	(United States) Dyson Racing Team	(United States) Dorsey Schroeder (United States) Chris Dyson (United States) Rob Dyson	Riley & Scott Mk III	G	273
24	LMP900	20	(United States) Dyson Racing Team	(United States) Dorsey Schroeder (United States) Chris Dyson (United States) Rob Dyson	Lincoln (Élan) 6.0 L V8	G	273
25	LMP675	40	(France) Racing Organisation Course	(United States) Ryan Jones (United States) Jeff Jones (United States) Jeffrey Jones	Reynard 2KQ-LM	M	271
25	LMP675	40	(France) Racing Organisation Course	(United States) Ryan Jones (United States) Jeff Jones (United States) Jeffrey Jones	Volkswagen HPT 2.0 L Turbo I4	M	271
26	LMP675	24	(Japan) AutoExe Motorsports	(United States) Jim Downing (United States) John Fergus (Japan) Yojiro Terada	AutoExe (WR) LMP-02	G	267
26	LMP675	24	(Japan) AutoExe Motorsports	(United States) Jim Downing (United States) John Fergus (Japan) Yojiro Terada	Mazda R26B 2.6 L 4-Rotor	G	267
27 DNF	LMP900	7	(United States) Team Cadillac	(France) Emmanuel Collard (France) Éric Bernard (Finland) JJ Lehto	Cadillac Northstar LMP02	M	256
27 DNF	LMP900	7	(United States) Team Cadillac	(France) Emmanuel Collard (France) Éric Bernard (Finland) JJ Lehto	Cadillac Northstar 4.0 L Turbo V8	M	256
28	LMP675	11	(United States) KnightHawk Racing	(United States) Andy Lally (United States) Steven Knight (United Kingdom) Jonny Kane	MG-Lola EX257	A	256
28	LMP675	11	(United States) KnightHawk Racing	(United States) Andy Lally (United States) Steven Knight (United Kingdom) Jonny Kane	MG (AER) XP20 2.0 L Turbo I4	A	256
29	LMP900	19	(United Kingdom) Team Ascari	(United States) Timothy Bell (South Africa) Werner Lupberger (Denmark) Kristian Kolby	Ascari KZR-1	G	255
29	LMP900	19	(United Kingdom) Team Ascari	(United States) Timothy Bell (South Africa) Werner Lupberger (Denmark) Kristian Kolby	Judd GV4 4.0 L V10	G	255
30	GTS	77	(United Kingdom) Prodrive	(Czech Republic) Tomáš Enge (Sweden) Rickard Rydell (Switzerland) Alain Menu	Ferrari 550-GTS Maranello	M	252
30	GTS	77	(United Kingdom) Prodrive	(Czech Republic) Tomáš Enge (Sweden) Rickard Rydell (Switzerland) Alain Menu	Ferrari 5.9 L V12	M	252
31	LMP900	8	(United States) Team Cadillac	(Italy) Max Angelelli (South Africa) Wayne Taylor (France) Christophe Tinseau	Cadillac Northstar LMP02	M	236
31	LMP900	8	(United States) Team Cadillac	(Italy) Max Angelelli (South Africa) Wayne Taylor (France) Christophe Tinseau	Cadillac Northstar 4.0 L Turbo V8	M	236
32 DNF	LMP675	28	(France) Welter Racing	(United States) A.J. Smith (France) Stéphane Daoudi (France) Jean-René de Fournoux	WR LMP02	M	232
32 DNF	LMP675	28	(France) Welter Racing	(United States) A.J. Smith (France) Stéphane Daoudi (France) Jean-René de Fournoux	Peugeot 2.0 L Turbo I4	M	232
33 DNF	GTS	5	(United States) Park Place Racing	(United States) Chris Bingham (United States) Vic Rice (United States) Peter MacLeod	Saleen S7-R	Y	228
33 DNF	GTS	5	(United States) Park Place Racing	(United States) Chris Bingham (United States) Vic Rice (United States) Peter MacLeod	Ford 7.0 L V8	Y	228
34	GT	32	(France) JMB Racing	(Brazil) Oswaldo Negri Jr. (United States) Joe Vannini (Italy) Andrea Garbagnati	Ferrari 360 Modena N-GT	P	228
34	GT	32	(France) JMB Racing	(Brazil) Oswaldo Negri Jr. (United States) Joe Vannini (Italy) Andrea Garbagnati	Ferrari 3.6 L V8	P	228
35 DNF	GTS	46	(Netherlands) Carsport Holland (Italy) Racing Box	(Netherlands) Mike Hezemans (Belgium) Anthony Kumpen (Italy) Luca Cappellari	Chrysler Viper GTS-R	P	194
35 DNF	GTS	46	(Netherlands) Carsport Holland (Italy) Racing Box	(Netherlands) Mike Hezemans (Belgium) Anthony Kumpen (Italy) Luca Cappellari	Chrysler 8.0 L V10	P	194
36 DNF	LMP900	00	(United States) Gunnar Racing	(United States) Gunnar Jeannette (United States) Chad Block (United States) Wayne Johnson	Panoz LMP-1 Roadster-S	G	148
36 DNF	LMP900	00	(United States) Gunnar Racing	(United States) Gunnar Jeannette (United States) Chad Block (United States) Wayne Johnson	Élan 6L8 6.0 L V8	G	148
37 DNF	LMP900	18	(United States) MBD Sportscar	(United States) Rick Sutherland (Belgium) Didier de Radigues (Belgium) Bruno Lambert	Panoz LMP07	G	146
37 DNF	LMP900	18	(United States) MBD Sportscar	(United States) Rick Sutherland (Belgium) Didier de Radigues (Belgium) Bruno Lambert	Mugen MF408S 4.0 L V8	G	146
38 DNF	GT	65	(United Kingdom) Harlow Motorsport	(United Kingdom) Terry Rymer (United Kingdom) Mike Youles (United Kingdom) Johnny Mowlem	Porsche 911 GT3-R	D	144
38 DNF	GT	65	(United Kingdom) Harlow Motorsport	(United Kingdom) Terry Rymer (United Kingdom) Mike Youles (United Kingdom) Johnny Mowlem	Porsche 3.6 L Flat-6	D	144
39 DNF	LMP675	69	(Canada) Kyser Racing	(Canada) Kyle Wankum (United States) Joe Foster (United States) Doc Bundy	Lola B2K/40	D	139
39 DNF	LMP675	69	(Canada) Kyser Racing	(Canada) Kyle Wankum (United States) Joe Foster (United States) Doc Bundy	Nissan (AER) VQL 3.0 L V6	D	139
40 DNF	LMP675	41	(France) Noël del Bello Racing (France) Racing Organisation Course	(United Kingdom) Mark Smithson (Switzerland) Jean-Denis Délétraz (Switzerland) Christophe Pillon	Reynard 2KQ-LM	M	134
40 DNF	LMP675	41	(France) Noël del Bello Racing (France) Racing Organisation Course	(United Kingdom) Mark Smithson (Switzerland) Jean-Denis Délétraz (Switzerland) Christophe Pillon	Volkswagen HPT 2.0 L Turbo I4	M	134
41 DNF	GT	99	(United States) Cirtek Motorsport	(United States) Chris Gleason (United Kingdom) Paul Dawson (New Zealand) Rob Wilson	Porsche 911 GT3-R	D	134
41 DNF	GT	99	(United States) Cirtek Motorsport	(United States) Chris Gleason (United Kingdom) Paul Dawson (New Zealand) Rob Wilson	Porsche 3.6 L Flat-6	D	134
42 DNF	GT	42	(United States) Orbit	(United States) Gary Schultheis (United States) Grady Willingham (United States) Tony Kester	Porsche 911 GT3-RS	M	107
42 DNF	GT	42	(United States) Orbit	(United States) Gary Schultheis (United States) Grady Willingham (United States) Tony Kester	Porsche 3.6 L Flat-6	M	107
43 DNF	GTS	44	(United States) American Viperacing	(United States) Simon Gregg (United States) Marc Bunting (United States) Tom Weickardt	Dodge Viper GTS-R	P	104
43 DNF	GTS	44	(United States) American Viperacing	(United States) Simon Gregg (United States) Marc Bunting (United States) Tom Weickardt	Dodge 8.0 L V10	P	104
44 DNF	GT	12	(Netherlands) Spyker Squadron	(United States) Derek Hill (Netherlands) Peter Kox (Netherlands) Hans Hugenholtz	Spyker C8 Double-12R	D	92
44 DNF	GT	12	(Netherlands) Spyker Squadron	(United States) Derek Hill (Netherlands) Peter Kox (Netherlands) Hans Hugenholtz	BMW (Mader) 4.0 L V8	D	92
45 DNF	LMP900	17	(United States) MBD Sportscars	(Canada) Scott Maxwell (Canada) John Graham (Venezuela) Milka Duno	Panoz LMP07	G	78
45 DNF	LMP900	17	(United States) MBD Sportscars	(Canada) Scott Maxwell (Canada) John Graham (Venezuela) Milka Duno	Mugen MF408S 4.0 L V8	G	78
46 DNF	LMP900	50	(United States) Panoz Motor Sports	(Australia) David Brabham (Denmark) Jan Magnussen (Belgium) Eric van de Poele	Panoz LMP01 Evo	M	56
46 DNF	LMP900	50	(United States) Panoz Motor Sports	(Australia) David Brabham (Denmark) Jan Magnussen (Belgium) Eric van de Poele	Élan 6L8 6.0 L V8	M	56
47 DNF	LMP900	30	(United States) Intersport Racing	(United States) John Macaluso (United States) Mark Neuhaus (United States) Butch Birckell	Lola B2K/10B	G	53
47 DNF	LMP900	30	(United States) Intersport Racing	(United States) John Macaluso (United States) Mark Neuhaus (United States) Butch Birckell	Judd GV4 4.0 L V10	G	53
48 DNF	GT	79	(United States) J-3 Racing	(United States) David Murry (United States) Justin Jackson (United States) Mike Fitzgerald	Porsche 911 GT3-RS	D	53
48 DNF	GT	79	(United States) J-3 Racing	(United States) David Murry (United States) Justin Jackson (United States) Mike Fitzgerald	Porsche 3.6 L Flat-6	D	53
49 DNF	GT	66	(United States) The Racer's Group	(United States) Kevin Buckler (United States) Michael Schrom (United States) Darren Law	Porsche 911 GT3-RS	M	42
49 DNF	GT	66	(United States) The Racer's Group	(United States) Kevin Buckler (United States) Michael Schrom (United States) Darren Law	Porsche 3.6 L Flat-6	M	42
50 DNF	GT	29	(United Kingdom) Sebah Automotive Ltd.	(United Kingdom) Bart Hayden (United Kingdom) Mark Griffiths (United States) Stephen Earle	Porsche 911 GT3-R	D	37
50 DNF	GT	29	(United Kingdom) Sebah Automotive Ltd.	(United Kingdom) Bart Hayden (United Kingdom) Mark Griffiths (United States) Stephen Earle	Porsche 3.6 L Flat-6	D	37
51 DNF	GTS	83	(United Kingdom) Graham Nash Motorsport	(United Kingdom) Ian McKellar (Brazil) Thomas Erdos (United States) Ron Johnson	Saleen S7-R	P	36
51 DNF	GTS	83	(United Kingdom) Graham Nash Motorsport	(United Kingdom) Ian McKellar (Brazil) Thomas Erdos (United States) Ron Johnson	Ford 7.0 L V8	P	36
52 DNF	GT	31	(France) JMB Racing	(United States) Peter Argetsinger (United States) Ryan Hunter-Reay (Italy) Andrea Montermini	Ferrari 360 Modena N-GT	P	28
52 DNF	GT	31	(France) JMB Racing	(United States) Peter Argetsinger (United States) Ryan Hunter-Reay (Italy) Andrea Montermini	Ferrari 3.6 L V8	P	28
53 DNF	LMP675	55	(United States) Team Bucknum Racing	(United States) Chris McMurry (United States) Bryan Willman (Germany) Pierre Ehret	Pilbeam MP84	A	21
53 DNF	LMP675	55	(United States) Team Bucknum Racing	(United States) Chris McMurry (United States) Bryan Willman (Germany) Pierre Ehret	Nissan (AER) VQL 3.0 L V6	A	21
54 DNF	LMP900	27	(United States) Doran Lista Racing	(Belgium) Didier Theys (Switzerland) Fredy Lienhard (Italy) Mauro Baldi	Dallara SP1	Y	20
54 DNF	LMP900	27	(United States) Doran Lista Racing	(Belgium) Didier Theys (Switzerland) Fredy Lienhard (Italy) Mauro Baldi	Judd GV4 4.0 L V10	Y	20
55 DNF	GT	57	(Germany) Freisinger Motorsport	(Germany) Hans Fertl (France) Romain Dumas (Portugal) Ni Amorim	Porsche 911 GT3-RS	D	19
55 DNF	GT	57	(Germany) Freisinger Motorsport	(Germany) Hans Fertl (France) Romain Dumas (Portugal) Ni Amorim	Porsche 3.6 L Flat-6	D	19
56 DNF	GT	33	(United States) MSB Motorsport	(United Kingdom) Marino Franchitti (Germany) Ralf Kelleners	Ferrari 360 Modena GT	G	12
56 DNF	GT	33	(United States) MSB Motorsport	(United Kingdom) Marino Franchitti (Germany) Ralf Kelleners	Ferrari 3.6 L V8	G	12
57 DNF	LMP675	56	(United States) Team Bucknum Racing	(United States) Jeff Bucknum (United States) Dick Downs (United States) Allan Ziegelman	Pilbeam MP84	A	11
57 DNF	LMP675	56	(United States) Team Bucknum Racing	(United States) Jeff Bucknum (United States) Dick Downs (United States) Allan Ziegelman	Nissan (AER) VQL 3.0 L V6	A	11
58 DNF	GTS	0	(Italy) Team Olive Garden	(Italy) Mimmo Schiattarella (Italy) Emanuele Naspetti (Venezuela) Johnny Cecotto	Ferrari 550 Maranello	M	11
58 DNF	GTS	0	(Italy) Team Olive Garden	(Italy) Mimmo Schiattarella (Italy) Emanuele Naspetti (Venezuela) Johnny Cecotto	Ferrari 6.0 L V12	M	11
DSQ^{†}	GTS	25	(Germany) Konrad Motorsport	(United States) Charles Slater (United Kingdom) Gavin Pickering (Switzerland) Walter Brun	Saleen S7-R	P	44
DSQ^{†}	GTS	25	(Germany) Konrad Motorsport	(United States) Charles Slater (United Kingdom) Gavin Pickering (Switzerland) Walter Brun	Ford 7.0 L V8	P	44
DNS	LMP675	89	(Canada) Porschehaus Racing	(Canada) Stephane Veilleux (Canada) Robert Julien (United States) Adam Merzon	Lola B2K/40	D	-
DNS	LMP675	89	(Canada) Porschehaus Racing	(Canada) Stephane Veilleux (Canada) Robert Julien (United States) Adam Merzon	Nissan (AER) VQL 3.0 L V6	D	-
DNS	LMP900	87	(United States) Sezio Florida Racing Team	(United States) John Mirro (France) Georges Forgeois (France) François O'Born	Norma M2000	P	-
DNS	LMP900	87	(United States) Sezio Florida Racing Team	(United States) John Mirro (France) Georges Forgeois (France) François O'Born	Ford (Kinetic) 6.0 L V8	P	-

† - #25 Konrad Motorsport was disqualified during the race for receiving outside assistance for repairs while still on the track.

== Statistics ==
- Pole Position - #1 Audi Sport North America - 1:48.029
- Fastest Lap - #1 Audi Sport North America - 1:48.418
- Distance - 2060.282 km
- Average Speed - 171.406 km/h

American Le Mans Series
Previous race: None	2002 season	Next race: 2002 Grand Prix of Sonoma
