= 2001 Petit Le Mans =

Sportscar endurance race in Georgia, US

The Track map of Road Atlanta

The 2001 Audi presents Petit Le Mans was the fourth running of this event. It was the tenth and final round of the 2001 American Le Mans Series season as well as the seventh and final round of the 2001 European Le Mans Series season. It took place at Road Atlanta, Georgia, on October 6, 2001.

== Official results ==
Class winners in bold.

Pos	Class	No	Team	Drivers	Chassis	Tyre	Laps
Pos	Class	No	Team	Drivers	Engine	Tyre	Laps
1	**LMP900**	**2**	**(Germany) Audi Sport North America**	**(Germany) Frank Biela (Italy) Emanuele Pirro**	**Audi R8**	M	**394**
1	**LMP900**	**2**	**(Germany) Audi Sport North America**	**(Germany) Frank Biela (Italy) Emanuele Pirro**	**Audi 3.6L Turbo V8**	M	**394**
2	LMP900	18	(United Kingdom) Johansson Motorsport (United Kingdom) Arena Motorsport	(Sweden) Stefan Johansson (France) Patrick Lemarié	Audi R8	M	391
2	LMP900	18	(United Kingdom) Johansson Motorsport (United Kingdom) Arena Motorsport	(Sweden) Stefan Johansson (France) Patrick Lemarié	Audi 3.6L Turbo V8	M	391
3	LMP900	38	(United States) Champion Racing	(United Kingdom) Andy Wallace (United Kingdom) Johnny Herbert	Audi R8	M	388
3	LMP900	38	(United States) Champion Racing	(United Kingdom) Andy Wallace (United Kingdom) Johnny Herbert	Audi 3.6L Turbo V8	M	388
4	LMP900	8	(United States) Team Cadillac	(South Africa) Wayne Taylor (Italy) Max Angelelli (France) Christophe Tinseau	Cadillac Northstar LMP01	M	382
4	LMP900	8	(United States) Team Cadillac	(South Africa) Wayne Taylor (Italy) Max Angelelli (France) Christophe Tinseau	Cadillac Northstart 4.0L Turbo V8	M	382
5	LMP900	7	(United States) Team Cadillac	(France) Emmanuel Collard (Belgium) Marc Goossens	Cadillac Northstar LMP01	M	364
5	LMP900	7	(United States) Team Cadillac	(France) Emmanuel Collard (Belgium) Marc Goossens	Cadillac Northstar 4.0L Turbo V8	M	364
6	**GTS**	**4**	**(United States) Corvette Racing**	**(United States) Andy Pilgrim (United States) Kelly Collins (France) Franck Fréon**	**Chevrolet Corvette C5-R**	G	**362**
6	**GTS**	**4**	**(United States) Corvette Racing**	**(United States) Andy Pilgrim (United States) Kelly Collins (France) Franck Fréon**	**Chevrolet 7.0L V8**	G	**362**
7	**LMP675**	**57**	**(United States) Dick Barbour Racing**	**(Canada) John Graham (Canada) Scott Maxwell (Venezuela) Milka Duno**	**Reynard 01Q**	G	**361**
7	**LMP675**	**57**	**(United States) Dick Barbour Racing**	**(Canada) John Graham (Canada) Scott Maxwell (Venezuela) Milka Duno**	**Judd GV675 3.4L V8**	G	**361**
8	**GT**	**6**	**(United States) Prototype Technology Group**	**(Germany) Hans-Joachim Stuck (United States) Boris Said (United States) Bill Auberlen**	**BMW M3 GTR**	Y	**360**
8	**GT**	**6**	**(United States) Prototype Technology Group**	**(Germany) Hans-Joachim Stuck (United States) Boris Said (United States) Bill Auberlen**	**BMW 4.0L V8**	Y	**360**
9	GT	43	(Germany) BMW Motorsport (Germany) Schnitzer Motorsport	(Germany) Dirk Müller (Germany) Jörg Müller	BMW M3 GTR	M	359
9	GT	43	(Germany) BMW Motorsport (Germany) Schnitzer Motorsport	(Germany) Dirk Müller (Germany) Jörg Müller	BMW 3.2L I6	M	359
10	LMP900	50	(United States) Panoz Motor Sports	(Denmark) Jan Magnussen (Australia) David Brabham	Panoz LMP-1 Roadster-S	M	358
10	LMP900	50	(United States) Panoz Motor Sports	(Denmark) Jan Magnussen (Australia) David Brabham	Élan 6L8 6.0L V8	M	358
11	GT	23	(United States) Alex Job Racing	(Germany) Lucas Luhr (Germany) Sascha Maassen	Porsche 911 GT3-RS	M	355
11	GT	23	(United States) Alex Job Racing	(Germany) Lucas Luhr (Germany) Sascha Maassen	Porsche 3.6L Flat-6	M	355
12	GT	42	(Germany) BMW Motorsport (Germany) Schnitzer Motorsport	(Austria) Karl Wendlinger (Finland) JJ Lehto (Sweden) Fredrik Ekblom	BMW M3 GTR	M	355
12	GT	42	(Germany) BMW Motorsport (Germany) Schnitzer Motorsport	(Austria) Karl Wendlinger (Finland) JJ Lehto (Sweden) Fredrik Ekblom	BMW 4.0L V8	M	355
13	GTS	26	(Germany) Konrad Team Saleen	(United States) Terry Borcheller (United States) Charles Slater (Austria) Franz Konrad	Saleen S7-R	G	355
13	GTS	26	(Germany) Konrad Team Saleen	(United States) Terry Borcheller (United States) Charles Slater (Austria) Franz Konrad	Ford 7.0L V8	G	355
14	GT	22	(United States) Alex Job Racing	(United States) Randy Pobst (Germany) Christian Menzel	Porsche 911 GT3-RS	M	353
14	GT	22	(United States) Alex Job Racing	(United States) Randy Pobst (Germany) Christian Menzel	Porsche 3.6L Flat-6	M	353
15	GTS	45	(United States) American Viperacing	(Netherlands) Mike Hezemans (Belgium) Anthony Kumpen	Dodge Viper GTS-R	D	349
15	GTS	45	(United States) American Viperacing	(Netherlands) Mike Hezemans (Belgium) Anthony Kumpen	Dodge 8.0L V10	D	349
16	GT	30	(United States) Petersen Motorsports	(United Kingdom) Johnny Mowlem (France) Jean-Christophe Boullion (United States) Mike Fitzgerald	Porsche 911 GT3-R	M	344
16	GT	30	(United States) Petersen Motorsports	(United Kingdom) Johnny Mowlem (France) Jean-Christophe Boullion (United States) Mike Fitzgerald	Porsche 3.6L Flat-6	M	344
17	LMP675	21	(United States) Archangel Motorsports	(United States) Andrew Davis (United States) Jason Workman (United Kingdom) Ben Devlin	Lola B2K/40	A	341
17	LMP675	21	(United States) Archangel Motorsports	(United States) Andrew Davis (United States) Jason Workman (United Kingdom) Ben Devlin	Nissan (AER) VQL 3.0L V6	A	341
18	GT	52	(Germany) Seikel Motorsport	(Canada) Tony Burgess (United States) Hugh Plumb (Italy) Stefano Buttiero	Porsche 911 GT3-RS	Y	341
18	GT	52	(Germany) Seikel Motorsport	(Canada) Tony Burgess (United States) Hugh Plumb (Italy) Stefano Buttiero	Porsche 3.6L Flat-6	Y	341
19	GT	69	(Canada) Kyser Racing	(Canada) Kye Wankum (United States) Joe Foster (United States) Doc Bundy	Porsche 911 GT3-R	D	329
19	GT	69	(Canada) Kyser Racing	(Canada) Kye Wankum (United States) Joe Foster (United States) Doc Bundy	Porsche 3.6L Flat-6	D	329
20	GT	29	(United Kingdom) Sebah Automotive	(United Kingdom) Bart Hayden (United Kingdom) Hugh Hayden (United States) Stephen Earle	Porsche 911 GT3-RS	D	325
20	GT	29	(United Kingdom) Sebah Automotive	(United Kingdom) Bart Hayden (United Kingdom) Hugh Hayden (United States) Stephen Earle	Porsche 3.6L Flat-6	D	325
21	GT	32	(United States) Orbit	(United States) Scooter Gabel (United States) Gary Schultheis (United States) Doc Lowman	Porsche 911 GT3-RS	D	324
21	GT	32	(United States) Orbit	(United States) Scooter Gabel (United States) Gary Schultheis (United States) Doc Lowman	Porsche 3.6L Flat-6	D	324
22	GTS	05	(United States) Park Place Racing (United States) Fordahl Motorsports	(United States) Chris Bingham (United States) Ron Johnson (United Kingdom) Oliver Gavin	Saleen S7-R	Y	312
22	GTS	05	(United States) Park Place Racing (United States) Fordahl Motorsports	(United States) Chris Bingham (United States) Ron Johnson (United Kingdom) Oliver Gavin	Ford 7.0L V8	Y	312
23	GT	75	(United States) Gunnar Racing	(United States) Gunnar Jeannette (United States) Joe Policastro, Sr. (United States) Joe Policastro, Jr.	Porsche 911 GT3-RS	D	253
23	GT	75	(United States) Gunnar Racing	(United States) Gunnar Jeannette (United States) Joe Policastro, Sr. (United States) Joe Policastro, Jr.	Porsche 3.6L Flat-6	D	253
24 DNF	GT	12	(United States) Aspen Knolls MCR	(United States) Shane Lewis (United States) Cort Wagner (United States) Bob Mazzuoccola	Callaway C12-R	G	221
24 DNF	GT	12	(United States) Aspen Knolls MCR	(United States) Shane Lewis (United States) Cort Wagner (United States) Bob Mazzuoccola	Chevrolet 7.0L V8	G	221
25	GTS	44	(United States) American Viperacing	(United States) Tom Weickardt (United States) Kevin Allen (United States) Rick Fairbanks	Dodge Viper GTS-R	D	220
25	GTS	44	(United States) American Viperacing	(United States) Tom Weickardt (United States) Kevin Allen (United States) Rick Fairbanks	Dodge 8.0L V10	D	220
26	LMP675	5	(United States) Dick Barbour Racing	(Belgium) Bruno Lambert (Belgium) Didier de Radigues (South Africa) Earl Goddard	Reynard 01Q	G	213
26	LMP675	5	(United States) Dick Barbour Racing	(Belgium) Bruno Lambert (Belgium) Didier de Radigues (South Africa) Earl Goddard	Judd GV675 3.4L V8	G	213
27 DNF	LMP675	11	(United States) Roock-KnightHawk Racing	(United States) Steven Knight (United States) Mel Hawkins (Germany) Claudia Hürtgen	Lola B2K/40	A	209
27 DNF	LMP675	11	(United States) Roock-KnightHawk Racing	(United States) Steven Knight (United States) Mel Hawkins (Germany) Claudia Hürtgen	Nissan (AER) VQL 3.4L V6	A	209
28 DNF	GT	34	(United States) Orbit	(United States) Leo Hindery (United States) Tony Kester (United States) Peter Baron	Porsche 911 GT3-RS	D	183
28 DNF	GT	34	(United States) Orbit	(United States) Leo Hindery (United States) Tony Kester (United States) Peter Baron	Porsche 3.6L Flat-6	D	183
29 DNF	GTS	25	(Germany) Konrad Motorsport	(Switzerland) Walter Brun (Switzerland) Toni Seiler	Saleen S7-R	D	152
29 DNF	GTS	25	(Germany) Konrad Motorsport	(Switzerland) Walter Brun (Switzerland) Toni Seiler	Ford 7.0L V8	D	152
30 DNF	GT	15	(United States) Dick Barbour Racing	(United States) Grady Willingham (United States) Taz Harvey (United Kingdom) Sam Hancock	Porsche 911 GT3-R	D	137
30 DNF	GT	15	(United States) Dick Barbour Racing	(United States) Grady Willingham (United States) Taz Harvey (United Kingdom) Sam Hancock	Porsche 3.6L Flat-6	D	137
31 DNF	GT	10	(United States) Prototype Technology Group	(United States) David Murry (United States) Brian Cunningham (Sweden) Niclas Jonsson	BMW M3 GTR	Y	136
31 DNF	GT	10	(United States) Prototype Technology Group	(United States) David Murry (United States) Brian Cunningham (Sweden) Niclas Jonsson	BMW 4.0L V8	Y	136
32 DNF	LMP675	31	(United States) Team Bucknum Racing	(United States) Chris McMurry (United States) Bryan Willman (United States) Bret Arsenault	Pilbeam MP84	A	108
32 DNF	LMP675	31	(United States) Team Bucknum Racing	(United States) Chris McMurry (United States) Bryan Willman (United States) Bret Arsenault	Nissan (AER) VQL 3.0L V6	A	108
33 DNF	GTS	88	(United Kingdom) Prodrive Allstars	(Netherlands) Peter Kox (Sweden) Rickard Rydell (Belgium) Marc Duez	Ferrari 550-GTS Maranello	M	103
33 DNF	GTS	88	(United Kingdom) Prodrive Allstars	(Netherlands) Peter Kox (Sweden) Rickard Rydell (Belgium) Marc Duez	Ferrari 5.9L V12	M	103
34 DNF	LMP900	16	(United States) Dyson Racing	(United States) Butch Leitzinger (United States) Elliott Forbes-Robinson (United Kingdom) James Weaver	Riley & Scott Mk III C	G	94
34 DNF	LMP900	16	(United States) Dyson Racing	(United States) Butch Leitzinger (United States) Elliott Forbes-Robinson (United Kingdom) James Weaver	Lincoln (Élan) 6.0L V8	G	94
35 DNF	LMP675	39	(France) Racing Organisation Course	(Spain) Jordi Gené (France) Yannick Schroeder (Switzerland) Jean-Denis Délétraz	Reynard 2KQ-LM	M	60
35 DNF	LMP675	39	(France) Racing Organisation Course	(Spain) Jordi Gené (France) Yannick Schroeder (Switzerland) Jean-Denis Délétraz	Volkswagen 2.0L Turbo I4	M	60
36 DNF	GTS	19	(United Kingdom) Brookspeed	(Germany) Dino Steiner (United States) Joe Ellis (United States) John Cooper	Chrysler Viper GTS-R	D	35
36 DNF	GTS	19	(United Kingdom) Brookspeed	(Germany) Dino Steiner (United States) Joe Ellis (United States) John Cooper	Chrysler 8.0L V10	D	35
37 DNF	LMP900	1	(Germany) Audi Sport North America	(Italy) Rinaldo Capello (Denmark) Tom Kristensen	Audi R8	M	26
37 DNF	LMP900	1	(Germany) Audi Sport North America	(Italy) Rinaldo Capello (Denmark) Tom Kristensen	Audi 3.6L Turbo V8	M	26
38 DNF	LMP900	51	(United States) Panoz Motor Sports	(Germany) Klaus Graf (France) Franck Lagorce	Panoz LMP-1 Roadster-S	M	78
38 DNF	LMP900	51	(United States) Panoz Motor Sports	(Germany) Klaus Graf (France) Franck Lagorce	Élan 6L8 6.0L V8	M	78
DSQ^{†}	GT	33	(United States) MSB Motorsport	(United Kingdom) Marino Franchitti (United Kingdom) Kelvin Burt (Germany) Ralf Kelleners	Ferrari 360 Modena GT	G	26
DSQ^{†}	GT	33	(United States) MSB Motorsport	(United Kingdom) Marino Franchitti (United Kingdom) Kelvin Burt (Germany) Ralf Kelleners	Ferrari 3.6L V8	G	26
DSQ^{†}	GTS	3	(United States) Corvette Racing	(Canada) Ron Fellows (United States) Johnny O'Connell (United States) Scott Pruett	Chevrolet Corvette C5-R	G	2
DSQ^{†}	GTS	3	(United States) Corvette Racing	(Canada) Ron Fellows (United States) Johnny O'Connell (United States) Scott Pruett	Chevrolet 7.0L V8	G	2
DSQ^{†}	LMP900	37	(United States) Intersport Racing	(United States) John Field (United States) Rick Sutherland (United States) Mark Neuhaus	Lola B2K/10B	G	0
DSQ^{†}	LMP900	37	(United States) Intersport Racing	(United States) John Field (United States) Rick Sutherland (United States) Mark Neuhaus	Judd GV4 4.0L V10	G	0
DNS	GT	9	(United States) Prototype Technology Group	(United States) Bill Auberlen (United States) Boris Said	BMW M3	Y	-
DNS	GT	9	(United States) Prototype Technology Group	(United States) Bill Auberlen (United States) Boris Said	BMW 3.2L I6	Y	-
DNS	GT	47	(United States) Broadfoot Racing	(United States) John Warner (United States) Doc Lowman	Porsche 911 GT3-R	D	-
DNS	GT	47	(United States) Broadfoot Racing	(United States) John Warner (United States) Doc Lowman	Porsche 3.6L Flat-6	D	-

† - #33 MSB Motorsport, #3 Corvette Racing, and #37 Intersport Racing were all disqualified during the race for receiving outside assistance while still on the track.

== Statistics ==
- Pole Position - #1 Audi Sport North America - 1:10.917
- Fastest Lap - #2 Audi Sport North America - 1:11.907
- Distance - 1610.567 km
- Average Speed - 173.816 km/h

American Le Mans Series
Previous race: 2001 Monterey Sports Car Championships	2001 season	Next race: None
