= 2003 24 Hours of Le Mans =

71st 24 Hours of Le Mans endurance race

Previous: 2002	Next: 2004
Index: Races | Winners

Circuit de la Sarthe track

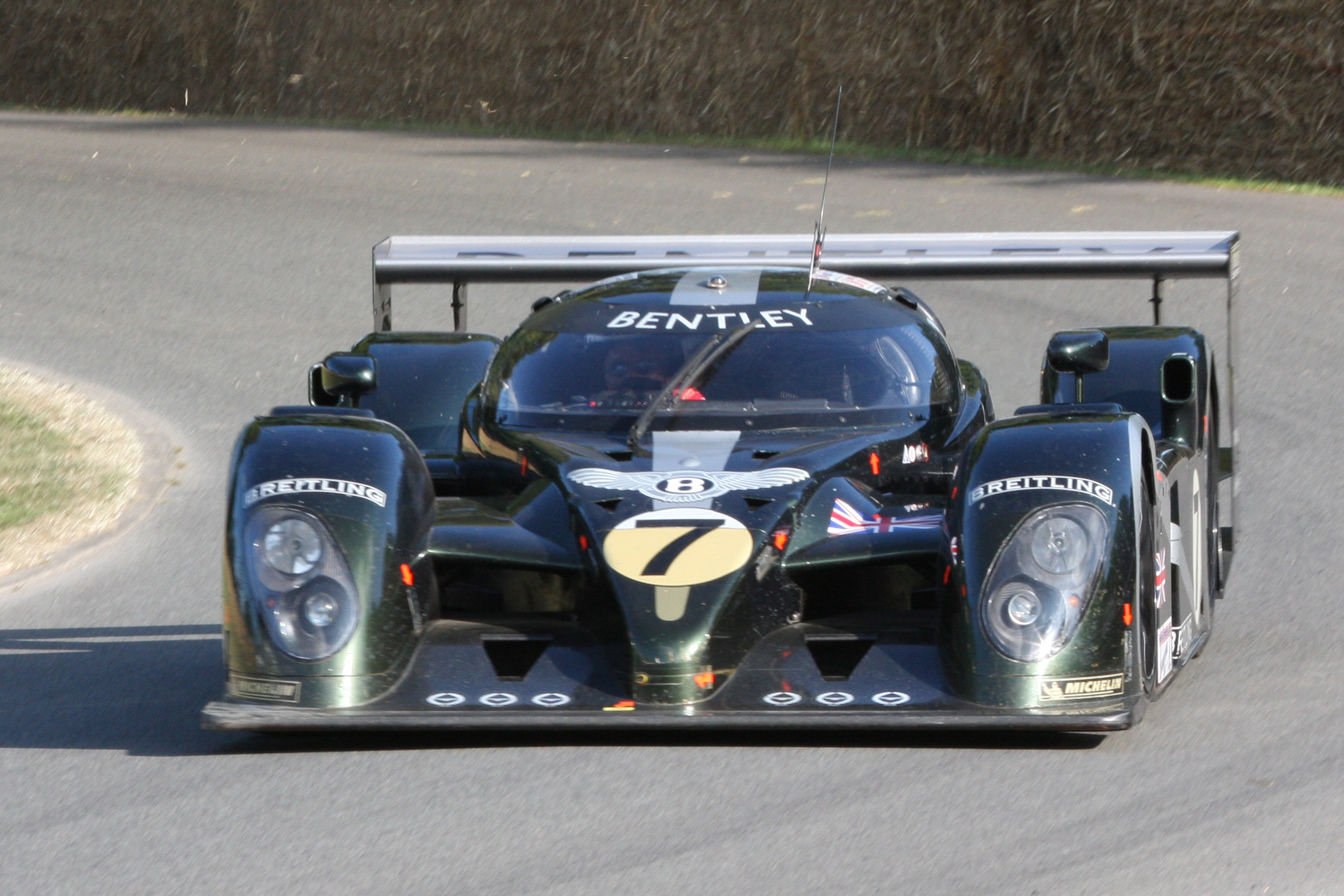
The race-winning No. 7 Bentley Speed 8, driven at the 2009 Goodwood Festival of Speed.

The 2003 24 Hours of Le Mans (French: 71^{e} 24 Heures du Mans) was a non-championship 24-hour automobile endurance race from 14 to 15 June 2003 at the Circuit de la Sarthe near Le Mans, France for teams of three drivers each entering Le Mans Prototype and Grand Touring cars before approximately around 220,000 to 250,000 spectators. It was the race's 71st edition, as organised by the automotive group, the Automobile Club de l'Ouest (ACO) since 1923. A test day was held seven weeks prior to the race on 4 May.

A Bentley Speed 8 shared by Dane Tom Kristensen, Italian Rinaldo Capello and Brit Guy Smith started from pole position after Kristensen set the fastest overall lap time in the second qualifying session. The team won the race by two laps over Mark Blundell, David Brabham and Johnny Herbert's sister Bentley. It was Capello and Smith's first Le Mans victory and Kristensen's fifth. Bentley's sixth overall victory was their first since the 1930 edition. Champion Racing's Audi R8 of JJ Lehto, Emanuele Pirro and Stefan Johansson in third overall won the Le Mans Prototype 900 (LMP900) category from Audi Sport Japan Team Goh's entry of Seiji Ara, Jan Magnussen and Marco Werner.

A Noël del Bello Racing Reynard 2KQ-LM driven by Jean-Luc Maury-Laribière, Christophe Pillon and Didier André won the Le Mans Prototype 675 (LMP675) class, 32 laps ahead of the second-placed RN Motorsport DBA4 03S-Zytek car of John Nielsen, Casper Elgaard and Hayanari Shimoda. In a Ferrari 550-GTS Maranello, the Veloqx Prodrive Racing team of Jamie Davies, Tomáš Enge and Peter Kox won the Le Mans Grand Touring Sport (LMGTS) class, giving Ferrari its first GT victory since the 1981 race. Corvette Racing finished second and third in the category with their two C5-Rs ten laps behind. Porsche took the first six places in the Le Mans Grand Touring (LMGT) category, with an Alex Job Racing (AJR) 911-GT3 RS driven by Sascha Maassen, Emmanuel Collard and Lucas Luhr winning on the team's debut.

== Background and regulation changes ==
The 71st edition of the 24 Hours of Le Mans took place from 14 to 15 June 2003 at the 8.482 mi (13.650 km) Circuit de la Sarthe road racing circuit close to Le Mans, France, from 14 to 15 June. The race was first held in 1923 after the automotive journalist Charles Faroux, the Automobile Club de l'Ouest (ACO) general secretary Georges Durand and the industrialist Emile Coquile agreed to hold a test of vehicle reliability and durability. The 24 Hours of Le Mans is considered one of the world's most prestigious motor races and is part of the Triple Crown of Motorsport.

The ACO reduced the overall horsepower for the Le Mans Grand Touring Prototype (LMGTP), Le Mans Prototype 900 (LMP900), Le Mans Prototype 675 (LMP675), Le Mans Grand Touring Sports (LMGTS), and LMGT (Le Mans Grand Touring) categories by 10 per cent following the 2002 race. It permitted the use of carbon fibre chassis in the LMGTS class as well as the use of original automatic and semi-automatic gearboxes in a homologated road vehicle entered in the LMGTS and LMGT categories. Every engine had air restrictors installed and boost pressures were adjusted to try to achieve performance parity across all four categories. At a public meeting, drivers were told that crossing two wheels of a car over the white line denoting the circuit's boundaries and onto the kerbing would result in a stop-and-go penalty that would increase in severity if the transgression was repeated.

== Entries ==
By the entry deadline on 20 February 2003, the ACO had received 72 applications (31 for the Prototype classes and 41 for the Grand Touring categories). It issued 50 race invitations, with entries divided between the LMP900, LMGTP, LMP675, LMGTS, and LMGT classes.

=== Automatic entries ===
Six automatic entry invitations were earned by teams of two cars that won their class in the 2002 24 Hours of Le Mans or in the 2002 American Le Mans Series (ALMS) season-closing round, the Petit Le Mans at Road Atlanta, designated a qualifying race by the ACO as part of an agreement with the ALMS. Because entries were limited to teams, squads were not permitted to switch cars from last year to the next. They were allowed to change categories as long as the car's make did not change and the ACO approved the switch. Audi Sport Team Joest in both LMP categories, Corvette Racing in the LMGTS class and The Racer's Group (TRG) in the LMGT category received automatic entries based on class victories at the 2002 24 Hours of Le Mans. Audi Sport North America and Corvette also qualified after winning their respective classes at the Petit Le Mans, as did Alex Job Racing (AJR) in the LMGT category. However, Audi declined their automatic invitations after it withdrew its factory operations and forwent its defence of the overall victory.

=== Entry list ===
On 25 March 2003, the ACO selection committee announced the full 50-car entry list for Le Mans, plus six reserves. The field consisted of an equal number of Prototype and GT cars representing 22 different car manufacturers (14 in the GT classes and 8 in the Prototype categories). After a protest was raised by Larbre Compétition owner Jack Leconte and alpine skier Luc Alphand over their respective teams being allocated one entry, ACO president Michel Cosson stated that the entries chosen appeared to be of high quality and that the automotive group wanted a heterogeneous field. He said that it was not the proper way to select race entries but disliked those who sought to detract from the event's excitement.

=== Bio-ethanol car ===
Team Nasamax, based in Sittingbourne, England, entered the first renewable-fuelled sports prototype racing car at the Le Mans event to raise awareness of renewable fuels. The Reynard 01Q had a 2.65 L (162 cu in) Cosworth V8 turbocharged engine that ran on bio-ethanol fuel, which does not release new carbon dioxide into the atmosphere because it is produced from crops. The car's fuel and inlet air systems were modified to allow for more efficient fuel combustion. An alternative exhaust system was built and the turbocharger's housing and vanes were modified.

== Testing ==
On 4 May, the circuit hosted a mandatory pre-Le Mans testing day divided into two daytime sessions of four hours each, involving all 50 entries as well as all six reserve cars. The weather was clear and dry. In the final minutes of testing, Tom Kristensen in the No. 7 Bentley Speed 8 set the fastest lap of 3:34.820. Jan Magnussen was the fastest privateer Audi R8 for Team Goh in second and the No. 7 Bentley was third. Audi Sport UK and Champion Racing were fourth and fifth, respectively. Late in testing, Frank Biela lost control on an oil patch laid by a Pagani Zonda at the Porsche Curves, crashing into a barrier at 120 mph (190 km/h) and damaging the Audi Sport UK car's right-rear corner. The No. 26 RN Motorsport DBA4 03S-Zytek car led in LMP675 with a 3:47.708 lap, followed by the No. 29 Noël del Bello Racing Reynard 2KQ-LM and the No. 27 Intersport Racing MG-Lola EX257 vehicles. Tomáš Enge's No. 88 Prodrive Ferrari 550-GTS Maranello lapped fastest in LMGTS at 3:57.180, followed by Kelvin Burt's sister No. 80 car and Jérôme Policand's No. 72 Luc Alphand Aventures entry. Jörg Bergmeister's No. 81 TRG Porsche 911 GT3-RS led the LMGT class in 4:08.636, followed by Sascha Maassen's No. 93 AJR car.

== Qualifying ==
On the 11 and 12 June, all entrants had eight hours of qualifying divided into four two-hour sessions. To qualify for the race, all entrants were required to set a time that was within 110 per cent of the fastest lap set by the fastest vehicle in each of the four categories during the session. The weather was overcast and humid, and teams focused on car setup. Bentley took the lead early on with a flying lap from Mark Blundell's No. 8 car, followed by Kristensen and Johnny Herbert. Blundell eventually led with a lap of 3:35.321. In second, Kristensen's No. 7 car was a quarter-second slower and Jan Magnussen was the fastest Audi privateer in third. Jan Lammers' No. 15 Racing for Holland Dome S101 improved on each of his timed laps to finish fourth, and Champion Racing's JJ Lehto was fifth. John Nielsen drove RN Motorsport's DBA4 03S-Zytek car to provisional pole in LMP675 with a time of 3:45.243, eight seconds faster than the Intersport and Automotive Durango SRL teams. Oliver Gavin's No. 50 Chevrolet Corvette C5-R led the LMGTS category with a lap of 3:55.613 he set with five minutes left, demoting Enge's Prodrive Ferrari to second. After setting a lap in the final ten minutes, Johnny O'Connell's No. 53 car was third. In LMGT, AJR's Porsche of Maassen was almost three seconds faster than Timo Bernhard's TRG car and another seven-tenths faster than Marc Lieb's No. 87 Orbit entry. Separate spins from Chris McMurry, Kevin Buckler, Peter Kox and Andrew Bagnall did not disrupt the session.

Wednesday night's qualifying session was held with lower asphalt temperatures and teams performed scheduled simulation runs to see how their cars would perform under darkness with heavy fuel loads and worn tyres in the final 75 minutes. A lack of slower traffic and better grip allowed Kristensen to displace Blundell and twice improved the overall fastest lap to 3:32.843, followed by David Brabham's sister No. 8 Bentley in second and Biela's No. 10 Audi third. Emanuele Pirro put the No. 6 Audi fourth as Lammers fell to fifth. Marco Werner's Team Goh Audi went into a gravel trap but continued driving. In LMP675, Nielsen improved the RN Motorsport Zytek car's lap by a second to 3:44.343, increasing the gap over the Intersport team to almost ten seconds. 75 minutes into the session, the Team Bucknum Racing Pilbeam-JPX MP91 car's engine failed at Indianapolis corner and spilled oil on the track. Marshals took 20 minutes to dry the spilled oil before qualifying resumed. Enge's Prodrive Ferrari led the LMGTS class from the start. He improved on Corvette Racing's first-session lap to 3:53.278. After a session-long battle with Bernhard, Maassen in the AJR Porsche maintained his lead in the LMGT category. Bagnall lost control of the Seikel Motorsport Porsche and was beached in a gravel trap. A collision with a Prototype in the Dunlop Chicane damaged David Warnock's PK Sport car's track rod.

An accident stopped Thursday's first qualifying session after seven minutes. Jamie Campbell-Walter spun a Lister Storm LMP car after hitting a bump on the exit of the Dunlop Esses. He crashed backwards into a left-hand side barrier at the Dunlop Curve at 146 mph (235 km/h) and 14 g_{0} (140 m/s^{2}). Marshals and safety teams spent ten minutes extricating Campbell-Walter from the car, removing a section of carbon fibre bodywork trapping his legs and put him into an ambulance. The Lister Storm was withdrawn owing to a lack of spare parts. Later, Ian Khan's Thierry Perrier Porsche engine failed, spilling oil on the Dunlop Chicane circuit. Robin Liddell was caught out and spun into a gravel trap after hitting the oil. Simultaneously, Roland Bervillé spun, collided with a barrier with his front-right corner, and broke the rear wing of the T2M Motorsport car, temporarily stopping the session. Herbert's No. 8 Bentley led with a lap of 3:35.126, but remained second on the provisional grid. Magnussen used lower air temperatures to improve Team Goh Audi's lap and pass Lammers for third at the session's end. Lehto outperformed Champion Racing's entry to go fourth. Despite not lapping faster, the RN Motorsport Zytek car retained provisional pole in LMP675, while the Intersport Lola vehicle improved by more than five seconds to remain second in class. Enge's second-session lap kept him atop in LMGTS as Darren Turner in the sister Prodrive Ferrari passed the No. 50 Corvette for second. Because of the previous day's lap, AJR maintained its lead in LMGT.

The final session saw more incidents as cars were tested under race conditions. Thomas Erdos' Graham Nash Motorsport Saleen S7-R stopped on his outlap in a gravel trap at the Dunlop Chicane, necessitating trackside assistance. Gavin Pickering's Rachel Welter WR-Peugeot car stopped at the pit lane's exit, its bodywork flailing. Kristensen gave his co-drivers Rinaldo Capello and Guy Smith time to drive the No. 7 Bentley, which led the session and secured the pole position after Kristensen's lap from the second session. Herbert improved the sister No. 8 Bentley's lap on his second attempt by one-tenth of a second; it remained in second overall due to slower traffic delaying Herbert. Audi were unable to challenge, but Biela improved the Audi Sport UK team's fastest lap and went third and Magnussen qualified the Team Goh car fifth, separated by Lammers' Racing for Holland Dome car. Intersport's MG-Lola car was faster, but not fast enough to take the LMP675 pole position from the RN Motorsport Zytek car. which was two seconds slower due to a broken throttle linkage. The GT categories remained mostly unchanged, with Enge's No. 88 Prodrive Ferrari in LMGTS class failing to improve on his second session lap as teammate Turner moved to within four-tenths of a second. Porsche took the first three positions in the LMGT category, with Lucas Luhr's AJR car resetting the category lap record to a 4:06.984 and Bernhard's TRG entry qualifying second by four hundredths of a second.

=== Qualifying results ===
Pole position winners in each class are indicated in bold The fastest time set by each entry is denoted in gray.

Final qualifying classification
Pos	Class	No.	Team	Car	Day 1	Day 2	Gap
**1**	**LMGTP**	**7**	**Team Bentley**	**Bentley Speed 8**	**3:32.843**	**3:33.158**	—
2	LMGTP	8	Team Bentley	Bentley Speed 8	3:35.222	3:35.098	+2.255
**3**	**LMP900**	**10**	**Audi Sport UK**	**Audi R8**	3:37.076	**3:35.745**	+2.902
4	LMP900	15	Racing for Holland	Dome S101	3:37.350	3:36.156	+3.313
5	LMP900	5	Audi Sport Japan Team Goh	Audi R8	3:37.691	3:36.418	+3.575
6	LMP900	6	Champion Racing	Audi R8	3:37.316	3:36.857	+4.014
7	LMP900	4	Riley & Scott Racing	Riley & Scott Mk III C	3:43.528	3:37.476	+4.633
8	LMP900	16	Racing for Holland	Dome S101	3:38.908	3:38.058	+5.215
9	LMP900	13	Courage Compétition	Courage C60	3:42.558	3:40.400	+6.257
10	LMP900	11	JML Team Panoz	Panoz LMP01 Evo	3:40.766	3:40.826	+6.933
11	LMP900	17	Pescarolo Sport	Courage C60	3:40.839	3:41.311	+7.006
12	LMP900	9	Kondo Racing	Dome S101	3:41.608	3:43.371	+8.775
13	LMP900	18	Pescarolo Sport	Courage C60	3:43.151	3:48.052	+10.308
WD	LMP900	20	Lister Racing	Lister Storm LMP	3:43.857	—	+11.114^{1}
14	LMP900	12	JML Team Panoz	Panoz LMP01 Evo	3:43.924	3:43.970	+11.177
**15**	**LMP675**	**26**	**RN Motorsport Ltd.**	**DBA4 03S**	**3:44.333**	3:44.518	+11.490
16	LMP675	27	Intersport Racing	MG-Lola EX257	3:53.212	3:46.404	+13.561
17	LMP675	31	Courage Compétition	Courage C65	3:55.003	3:51.550	+18.707
18	LMP900	19	Automotive Durango SRL	Durango LMP1	3:53.252	3:52.194	+19.351
**19**	**LMGTS**	**88**	**Veloqx Prodrive Racing**	**Ferrari 550-GTS Maranello**	**3:53.278**	3:54.355	+20.435
20	LMP900	14	Team Nasamax	Reynard 01Q	4:01.666	3:54.320	+21.477
21	LMGTS	80	Veloqx Prodrive Racing	Ferrari 550-GTS Maranello	3:56.267	3:54.725	+21.878
22	LMP675	29	Noël del Bello Racing	Reynard 2KQ-LM	3:55.234	3:58.867	+22.391
23	LMGTS	50	Corvette Racing	Chevrolet Corvette C5-R	3:55.613	3:56.905	+22.770
24	LMGTS	72	Luc Alphand Aventures	Ferrari 550-GTS Maranello	3:56.834	3:56.216	+23.373
25	LMGTS	53	Corvette Racing	Chevrolet Corvette C5-R	3:58.941	3:59.974	+26.198
26	LMP675	24	Rachel Welter	WR LMP01	3:59.477	4:04.593	+26.594
27	LMGTS	64	Ray Mallock Ltd.	Saleen S7-R	4:01.163	4:07.943	+28.320
28	LMGTS	66	Konrad Motorsport	Saleen S7-R	4:02.090	4:01.331	+28.488
29	LMGTS	86	Larbre Compétition	Chrysler Viper GTS-R	4:05.193	4:01.927	+29.077
30	LMP675	23	Team Bucknum Racing	Pilbeam MP91	4:02.753	4:35.436	+29.910
31	LMGTS	61	Carsport America	Pagani Zonda GR	4:19.885	4:04.437	+31.604
32	LMGTS	68	Scorp Motorsport Communication	Chrysler Viper GTS-R	4:11.816	4:04.822	+31.979
**33**	**LMGT**	**93**	**Alex Job Racing**	**Porsche 911 GT3-RS**	4:07.996	**4:06.984**	+34.141
34	LMGT	81	The Racer's Group	Porsche 911 GT3-RS	4:08.105	4:07.028	+34.186
35	LMP900	21	Edouard Sezionale	Norma M2000-2	4:08.081	4:09.120	+34.238
36	LMGT	87	Orbit Racing	Porsche 911 GT3-RS	4:10:292	5:14.276	+37.449
37	LMGT	78	PK Sport Ltd.	Porsche 911 GT3-RS	4:11.623	4:15.722	+38.780
38	LMGT	94	Risi Competizione	Ferrari 360 Modena GT	4:12.016	4:11.865	+39.023
39	LMGT	77	Team Taisan Advan	Porsche 911 GT3-RS	4:14.802	4:13.104	+40.261
40	LMP675	25	Gerard Welter	WR LMP02	4:14.785	4:26.336	+41.942
41	LMGT	95	Risi Competizione	Ferrari 360 Modena GT	4:18.268	4:15.342	+42.499
42	LMGT	83	Seikel Motorsport	Porsche 911 GT3-RS	4:18.592	4:16.792	+43.949
43	LMGT	92	Dewalt Racesports Salisbury	TVR Tuscan T400R	4:19.378	4:16.872	+44.029
44	LMGT	70	JMB Racing	Ferrari 360 Modena GT	4:18.161	4:17.138	+44.295
45	LMGT	75	Thierry Perrier	Porsche 911 GT3-RS	4:18.579	17:59.928	+45.736
46	LMGT	85	ST Team Orange Spyker	Spyker C8 Double-12R	4:21.473	4:18.887	+46.044
47	LMGT	99	XL Racing	Ferrari 550 Maranello	4:21.459	4:20.245	+47.402
48	LMGT	91	Dewalt Racesport Salisbury	TVR Tuscan T400R	4:23.425	4:20.288	+47.445
49	LMGT	84	T2M Motorsport	Porsche 911 GT3-RS	4:26.499	22:10.735	+53.656

Notes:

- **^1** – The No. 20 Lister Storm LMP was withdrawn due to accident damage in the third qualifying session.

== Warm-up ==
The drivers had a 45-minute warm-up session at 09:00 Central European Summer Time (UTC+02:00) in overcast and cool weather. Bentley stayed fastest with Blundell's No. 8 car lapping at 3:35.319. He was 2.615 seconds faster than the second-placed Bentley No. 7. The Audi Sport UK R8 was third with Champion Racing fourth and Racing for Holland Home fifth. The No. 50 Corvette led the LMGTS field and the TRG Porsche led in LMGT. Shortly after the session began, Romain Dumas' Team Nasamax Reynard experienced an ignition problem caused by a heat leak at the right of the engine's cylinder bank, severely damaging its engine compartment and necessitating a major component change.

== Race ==
=== Start ===
Thunderstorms were forecast, and despite an earlier heavy rain shower, the weather at the start of the race was clear. The air temperature approached 28 °C (82 °F). Approximately around 220,000 to 250,000 spectators attended the event. Both Bentley Speed 8s underwent checks to their ride heights, Ray Mallock rectified a faulty gearbox that leaked oil in the No. 64 Saleen S7-R, and Kondo Racing replaced the No. 9 Dome S101's V8 engine after a water leak. Don Panoz, the ALMS's founder, waved the French tricolour at 16:00 CEST to signal the start of the race, led by the starting pole sitter Capello's No. 7 Bentley. Following the withdrawal of the Lister Storm LMP, 49 cars were scheduled to start, but the No. 25 Gerard Welter WR LMP02 was in the pit lane with a mechanical fault. Capello maintained his lead, while Lammers' Racing for Holland car passed Magnussen's Team Goh Audi for third. Gavin brought the No. 50 Corvette into the pit lane at the end of the first lap with a throttle linkage issue, losing the car 26 minutes and dropping to last overall. When three privateer Audis passed Lammers, he dropped from second to sixth place as Bentley quickly pulled away from the rest of the field. Herbert briefly led Capello before the No. 8 Bentley made its first pit stop of the race on lap 10. Meanwhile, Intersport's Lola-MG took the lead in LMP675 after the RN Motorsport Zytek developed car trouble and AJR led the LMGT category.

The first hour of racing ended with the first crash, when Richard Stanton's No. 91 TVR Tuscan T400R was hit from behind by a Gerard Walter WR LMP02 car in the Porsche Curves, sending him into the outside concrete barrier at the complex's exit and breaking the car's right-rear suspension, stranding Stanton there. Stanton's repairs to the car's differential to make it driveable for a return to the pit lane were unsuccessful. Soon after, Capello locked the No. 7 Bentley's brakes as he approached the right-hand Mulsanne Corner, slowing to avoid spinning into a gravel trap. He held off Herbert in heavy traffic until Herbert passed him on the 23rd lap to retake the lead. Kristensen took over the No. 7 Bentley from Capello and retook the overall lead from Lehto's Audi R8 three laps later. Brabham's sister No. 8 car was called into the pit lane for a ten-second stop to have a loose door frame fixed. Casper Elgaard was the fastest driver in LMP675 at the time, restoring RN Motorsport Zytek to the class lead. On lap 28, Audi Sport UK instructed Biela to enter the pit lane. A Panoz prototype vehicle to his right prevented him from doing so, forcing him to complete an additional lap. The R8 slowed with a lack of fuel through Mulsanne Corner and was retired at the side of the track after Biela's attempt to weave and keep the car running on its starter failed.

Kristensen almost collided with Jean-Marc Gounon's Courage Compétition Judd exiting the pit lane in the third hour. At Arnage corner, Beppe Gabbiani's Racing for Holland car hit Kelly Collins' No. 50 Corvette, sending both cars spinning. Brabham's No. 8 Bentley passed Werner's Team Goh Audi R8 for second at the Dunlop Curve, but Werner reclaimed the position in slower traffic. Brabham reclaimed second when Werner entered the pit lane, as the RN Motorsport Zytek car lost the LMP675 class lead to Noël del Bello Racing's Reynard car of Didier André while its alternator was changed. After 3 hours and 40 minutes, safety cars were deployed to slow the race because an unknown car laid oil between the Mulsanne and Indianapolis turns. This prompted several cars to pit and brought much of the field closer together. The safety cars separated the field in the main LMP categories, leaving the Bentleys more than 2 minutes and 17 seconds apart, 50 seconds ahead of Werner's Team Goh Audi and another 50 seconds ahead of Stefan Johansson's Champion Racing car. Emmanuel Collard's AJR Porsche was forced into the pits with a faulty gearshift, allowing Buckler's TRG vehicle to take the LMGT lead until Bernhard made an unscheduled pit stop to replace a heavily slipping clutch. Jamie Davies' No. 88 Prodrive Ferrari came to the pit lane for a two-minute stop to fix a water leak, handing the lead to Kelvin Burt's sister No. 80 car.

=== Night ===
As night fell, the No. 29 Noël del Bello Racing Reynard car lost the LMP675 lead to the Intersport Racing MG-Lola car, which later saw driver Duncan Dayton spin at the PlayStation chicane but retain the class lead in the class. Tom Coronel's St Team Orange Spyker C8 Double-12R soon stopped at the pit lane entry with clutch failure. He exited the car and pushed it past a white line indicating where his pit crew could help. Coronel was then told by a trackside marshal that he could not push the car any further, and it dropped out of contention for completing the laps required for classification. The lead was 33 seconds between Smith and Capello's No. 7 Bentley and Blundell and Herbert's sister No. 8 car. Pirro's Champion Racing Audi R8 was third with Seiji Ara's Team Goh entry fourth. The LMGTS class was a close battle between the Prodrive pair of Kox and Anthony Davidson, who set nearly identical lap times during the seventh hour. Ron Fellows' No. 53 Corvette equalled their pace until the Ferraris increased their speed. In the eighth hour, Davidson spun into a gravel trap at the PlayStation chicane. The resulting pit stop to change the No. 80 Prodrive Ferrari's tyres and perform a precautionary check lost Davidson two laps and third place in LMGTS to Fellows.

David Saelens' Panoz, the Courage Compétition of Gounon, and Christophe Tinseau's Riley & Scott Mk III C-Ford were all within 20 seconds of each other for eighth place overall. Tinseau dropped out after a routine pit stop, leaving Saelens and Gounon separated by 18 seconds. Herbert's No. 8 Bentley pit stop on lap 116 saw a miscommunication between the mechanic holding a jack and a rear tyre fitter that cost him ten seconds. 1Lammers' Racing for Holland car closed a 15-second gap with its faster pace to pass Olivier Beretta's Riley & Scott Ford for fifth overall 19 laps later. Beretta suffered a puncture after hitting debris on the dirty side of the Mulsanne Straight at 190 mph (310 km/h) and slowed en route to the pit lane. Fellows' No. 50 Corvette, second in LMGTS, was hampered by a suspected alternator belt failure and entered the pit lane. A broken pulley operating the vehicle's oil pump was discovered by mechanics. They replaced the battery and the support, allowing Fellows to rejoin the circuit fourth in class. Kristensen's No. 7 Bentley made a 1-minute and 40-second pit stop to repair minor damage to the front of the car; he retained the overall lead over Brabham's sister No. 8 car. Luhr's No. 83 AJR Porsche succumbed to elevated oil and water temperatures caused by a sharp rock penetrating its radiator. The radiator was replaced in 24 minutes and five laps, and Luhr lost the LMGT class lead to Kazuyuki Nishizawa's No. 77 Team Taisan Advan car.

Magnussen spun at the Ford chicane, damaging Team Goh's Audi R8's front suspension. He drove the car to the pit lane, where mechanics worked for 8 minutes and 53 seconds to repair it. Werner drove the car back into fourth place. Jean-Luc Maury-Laribière of Noël del Bello Racingspun into a gravel trap at the Dunlop Curves. He recovered with the help of trackside marshals and retained the LMP675 class lead. Soheil Ayari's No. 18 Courage car passed Scott Maxwell's No. 12 Panoz LMP01 Evo car for ninth overall and then pulled away. After Team Taisan Advan made a pit stop to replace the driver's-side door, all three top LMGT cars were within a lap of each other, led by Johnny Mowlem's No. 94 Risi Competizione Ferrari. Mowlem held it until his car's engine failed on the Mulsanne Straight, handing Lieb's Orbit Porsche the class lead. Werner's Team Goh Audi R8 spent 10 minutes and 14 seconds in the garage twice for engine control unit repairs. Werner rejoined 3 minutes and 20 seconds ahead of Andy Wallace's Racing for Holland No. 15 car. As the race neared its halfway point, Smith's No. 7 Bentley lapped two to five seconds faster than Blundell's No. 8 car, extending the vehicle's overall lead to 1 minute and 20 seconds.

=== Morning to early afternoon ===
The second-placed car in LMGTS, Davidson's No. 80 Prodrive Ferrari, had a right-front wheel bearing fault in the 12th hour and was sent into a barrier at the end of the Mulsanne Straight at high speed. He extricated himself from the vehicle and was attended to by trackside marshals. Davidson was transported by ambulance to the infield medical centre to be examined by circuit doctors. He had bruising and a head concussion after hitting his head against a door, so he was taken to Centre Hospitalier Le Mans for a brain scan. Gavin's No. 50 Corvette C5-R moved to second in LMGTS after the Ferrari was retired. Prodrive requested that Kox, driving the No. 88 Ferrari, enter the pit lane for a precautionary brake check. Soon after, a low voltage indicator warning and no radio communication to the No. 8 Bentley's pit stall forced Blundell to pit for a replacement battery, losing the car two laps to the sister No. 7 entry. The No. 93 AJR Porsche led the field until a front splitter problem forced it into the pit lane for four minutes, handing the position to Lieb's Orbit vehicle. Owing to mechanical attrition among the Porsche 996s in the LMGT category, only two Porsches remained in contention for victory, and Ferrari was unable to challenge them. Front suspension problems for the No. 12 Panoz car and an engine failure curtailing the No. 4 Riley & Scott Mk III C's race promoted the No. 88 Prodrive Ferrari to tenth overall.

Luhr and Maassen's No. 93 AJR Porsche was able to battle Lieb's and later Leo Hindery's No. 87 Orbit car, eventually retaking the LMGT lead it had lost when it entered the pit lane for car repairs. Lammers suffered a left-rear puncture an hour and 20 minutes later, losing control of the No. 15 Racing For Holland car while braking. He spun several times backwards into a gravel trap at the Indianapolis corner, damaging a rear wheel. Track marshals pushed the car back onto the track, and Lammers drove to the pit lane to repair the damage. Gunnar Jeannette's No. 11 Panoz LMP01 Evo locked up and made light contact with the tyre barrier at Arnage corner simultaneously. Brabham made an unscheduled pit stop in the No. 8 Bentley for a second battery replacement. The change took 3 minutes, 32 seconds, and the car returned to the race in second overall. Collins' No. 50 Corvette transmission bearing was replaced in 15 minutes after bowing out of the battle for the LMGTS lead. Lehto's Champion Racing R8 could not take advantage of the No. 8 Bentley's mechanical issues and lost one additional lap after a spin on oil that sent him into the tyre wall. At the start of the 18th hour, Saelens in the No. 12 Panoz car lost grip through Mulsanne corner and made high-speed left-front contact with a tyre barrier. Saelens was unhurt, but the car's damage forced its retirement.

Maassen's No. 93 AJR Porsche entered the garage with a voltage loss corrected in six minutes by changing the alternator. Maassen returned to the track as the LMGT category leader. Wallace's No. 15 Racing for Holland Dome soon after had a flat battery, dropping the car from fifth to eighth overall. Gabbiani's sister No. 16 car's front-left tyre delaminated, launching carbon fibre debris from the car's front-left corner. The track needed cleaning and several cars had to pit again, necessitating the use of safety cars. Beretta's No. 11 Panoz car benefited the most from the safety car period, passing Jonathan Cochet's No. 13 Courage C60 vehicle on the Mulsanne Straight to finish fifth overall. Towards the end of the 20th hour, the LMP675 class leading Noël del Bello Reynard slowed with a misfiring engine but the car's 35-lap advantage kept it in the category lead. When Ayari's No. 18 Courage C60 began leaking fluids at the rear and entered the pit lane for a 22-minute repair, John Bosch's No. 15 Racing for Holland car reclaimed seventh. With the first four positions stable, attention focused on the battle for fifth place between the No. 11 Panoz LMP01 Evo and the No. 13 Courage C60 cars. Gaël Lasoudier's No. 99 XL Racing Ferrari had an rear engine bay fire at the PlayStation Chicane, causing the third deployment of the safety cars.

=== Finish ===
As the safety car period ended, Max Papis's No. 11 Panoz LMP01 Evo car caught and passed Stéphan Grégoire's No. 13 Courage C60 vehicle at Tetre Rouge turn. Fellows overtook his Corvette Racing teammate Collins in the final third of the lap to take second in LMGTS. Collins retook the lead from Fellows two laps later, before a pit stop for fuel, tyres and a driver change. O'Connell relieved Fellows and returned to second with a faster stop than Andy Pilgrim. Jean-Christophe Boullion's No. 17 Pescarolo Courage 60 car caught fire during a pit stop after fuel ignited. The team's mechanics intervened to extinguish the fire, allowing him to continue driving. Johansson's Champion Racing Audi stalled during a pit stop for tyres, fuel, and a driver swap with co-driver Pirro. The problem was fixed by replacing the battery in the car's right-hand corner. It returned to the track in third, ahead of Ara's Team Goh Audi. On the final lap, Lammers' No. 15 Racing for Holland Dome car caught and passed Gounon's No. 13 Courage Compétition C60 vehicle for sixth overall for his team. Meanwhile, Tristan Gommendy crashed at the Indianapolis turn, retiring the No. 16 Racing for Holland car in the pit lane.

Unhindered in the race's final hours, Smith was first in the No. 7 Bentley, completing 377 laps and finishing two laps ahead of the No. 8 Bentley of Brabham. The No. 7 Bentley team led all but seven of the laps run. Audi finished three laps behind with Champion Racing third overall and first in the LMP900 class, in their first defeat at Le Mans since the 2000 edition. Team Goh took fourth. It was Smith and Capello's first Le Mans victory and Kristensen's fifth. Kristensen became the first driver in history to win four consecutive 24 Hours of Le Mans. He also tied Derek Bell's record of five victories and was one win shy of Jacky Ickx's all-time record of six. It was Bentley's sixth overall Le Mans victory and its first since the 1930 race. Prodrive held their ten-lap lead in the LMGTS category, earning Enge, Kox and Davies their first class victories and Ferrari's first in a GT class since the 1981 edition. Corvette Racing completed the class podium with the No. 50 ahead of the No. 53. In the LMGT class, Porsche took the first six places, with AJR winning the category on the team's first visit to Le Mans. Orbit Racing (in its second appearance at Le Mans) and Thierry Perrier finished second and third in class. Noël del Bello Racing, unchallenged since the night, were victorious in the LMP675 class, 31 laps ahead of the RN Motorsport Zytek and 84 laps in front of Rachel Welter's WR LMP01. Of the 49 starting cars, 19 retired from the race.

== Official results ==
The minimum number of laps for classification (70 per cent of the overall winning car's race distance) was 264 laps. Class winners are denoted with bold.

Final race classification
Pos	Class	No.	Team	Drivers	Chassis	Tyre	Laps	Time/Retired
Pos	Class	No.	Team	Drivers	Engine	Tyre	Laps	Time/Retired
1	LMGTP	7	(United Kingdom) Team Bentley	(Italy) Rinaldo Capello (Denmark) Tom Kristensen (United Kingdom) Guy Smith	Bentley Speed 8	M	377	24:00:40.928
1	LMGTP	7	(United Kingdom) Team Bentley	(Italy) Rinaldo Capello (Denmark) Tom Kristensen (United Kingdom) Guy Smith	Bentley 4.0L Turbo V8	M	377	24:00:40.928
2	LMGTP	8	(United Kingdom) Team Bentley	(United Kingdom) Mark Blundell (Australia) David Brabham (United Kingdom) Johnny Herbert	Bentley Speed 8	M	375	+2 Laps
2	LMGTP	8	(United Kingdom) Team Bentley	(United Kingdom) Mark Blundell (Australia) David Brabham (United Kingdom) Johnny Herbert	Bentley 4.0L Turbo V8	M	375	+2 Laps
3	LMP900	6	(United States) Champion Racing	(Finland) JJ Lehto (Italy) Emanuele Pirro (Sweden) Stefan Johansson	Audi R8	M	372	+5 Laps
3	LMP900	6	(United States) Champion Racing	(Finland) JJ Lehto (Italy) Emanuele Pirro (Sweden) Stefan Johansson	Audi 3.6L Turbo V8	M	372	+5 Laps
4	LMP900	5	Audi Sport Japan Team Goh	(Japan) Seiji Ara (Denmark) Jan Magnussen (Germany) Marco Werner	Audi R8	M	370	+7 Laps
4	LMP900	5	Audi Sport Japan Team Goh	(Japan) Seiji Ara (Denmark) Jan Magnussen (Germany) Marco Werner	Audi 3.6L Turbo V8	M	370	+7 Laps
5	LMP900	11	(United States) JML Team Panoz	(Monaco) Olivier Beretta (United States) Gunnar Jeannette (Italy) Max Papis	Panoz LMP01 Evo	M	360	+17 Laps
5	LMP900	11	(United States) JML Team Panoz	(Monaco) Olivier Beretta (United States) Gunnar Jeannette (Italy) Max Papis	Élan 6L8 6.0L V8	M	360	+17 Laps
6	LMP900	15	(Netherlands) Racing for Holland	(Netherlands) Jan Lammers (Netherlands) John Bosch (United Kingdom) Andy Wallace	Dome S101	M	360	+17 Laps
6	LMP900	15	(Netherlands) Racing for Holland	(Netherlands) Jan Lammers (Netherlands) John Bosch (United Kingdom) Andy Wallace	Judd GV4 4.0 L V10	M	360	+17 Laps
7	LMP900	13	(France) Courage Compétition	(France) Jonathan Cochet (France) Stéphan Grégoire (France) Jean-Marc Gounon	Courage C60	M	360	+17 Laps
7	LMP900	13	(France) Courage Compétition	(France) Jonathan Cochet (France) Stéphan Grégoire (France) Jean-Marc Gounon	Judd GV4 4.0L V10	M	360	+17 Laps
8	LMP900	17	(France) Pescarolo Sport	(France) Jean-Christophe Boullion (France) Franck Lagorce (France) Stéphane Sarrazin	Courage C60	M	356	+21 Laps
8	LMP900	17	(France) Pescarolo Sport	(France) Jean-Christophe Boullion (France) Franck Lagorce (France) Stéphane Sarrazin	Peugeot 3.2L Turbo V6	M	356	+21 Laps
9	LMP900	18	(France) Pescarolo Sport	(France) Éric Hélary (France) Nicolas Minassian (France) Soheil Ayari	Courage C60	M	352	+25 Laps
9	LMP900	18	(France) Pescarolo Sport	(France) Éric Hélary (France) Nicolas Minassian (France) Soheil Ayari	Peugeot 3.2L Turbo V6	M	352	+25 Laps
10	GTS	88	(United Kingdom) Veloqx Prodrive Racing	(Czech Republic) Tomáš Enge (Netherlands) Peter Kox (United Kingdom) Jamie Davies	Ferrari 550-GTS Maranello	M	336	+41 Laps
10	GTS	88	(United Kingdom) Veloqx Prodrive Racing	(Czech Republic) Tomáš Enge (Netherlands) Peter Kox (United Kingdom) Jamie Davies	Ferrari F133 5.9L V12	M	336	+41 Laps
11	GTS	50	(United States) Corvette Racing	(United Kingdom) Oliver Gavin (United States) Kelly Collins (United States) Andy Pilgrim	Chevrolet Corvette C5-R	G	326	+51 Laps
11	GTS	50	(United States) Corvette Racing	(United Kingdom) Oliver Gavin (United States) Kelly Collins (United States) Andy Pilgrim	Chevrolet 7.0L V8	G	326	+51 Laps
12	GTS	53	(United States) Corvette Racing	(Canada) Ron Fellows (United States) Johnny O'Connell (France) Franck Fréon	Chevrolet Corvette C5-R	G	326	+51 Laps
12	GTS	53	(United States) Corvette Racing	(Canada) Ron Fellows (United States) Johnny O'Connell (France) Franck Fréon	Chevrolet 7.0L V8	G	326	+51 Laps
13	LMP900	9	(Japan) Kondo Racing	(Japan) Masahiko Kondō (Japan) Ukyo Katayama (Japan) Ryō Fukuda	Dome S101	Y	322	+55 Laps
13	LMP900	9	(Japan) Kondo Racing	(Japan) Masahiko Kondō (Japan) Ukyo Katayama (Japan) Ryō Fukuda	Mugen MF408S 4.0L V8	Y	322	+55 Laps
14	GT	93	(United States) Alex Job Racing (United States) Petersen Motorsports	(Germany) Sascha Maassen (France) Emmanuel Collard (Germany) Lucas Luhr	Porsche 911 GT3-RS	M	320	+57 Laps
14	GT	93	(United States) Alex Job Racing (United States) Petersen Motorsports	(Germany) Sascha Maassen (France) Emmanuel Collard (Germany) Lucas Luhr	Porsche 3.6L Flat-6	M	320	+57 Laps
15	LMP675	29	(France) Noël del Bello Racing	(France) Jean-Luc Maury-Laribière (Switzerland) Christophe Pillon (France) Didier André	Reynard 2KQ-LM	M	319	+58 Laps
15	LMP675	29	(France) Noël del Bello Racing	(France) Jean-Luc Maury-Laribière (Switzerland) Christophe Pillon (France) Didier André	Volkswagen HPT16 2.0L Turbo I4	M	319	+58 Laps
16	GTS	86	(France) Larbre Compétition	(France) Patrice Goueslard (France) Christophe Bouchut (Switzerland) Steve Zacchia	Chrysler Viper GTS-R	M	317	+60 Laps
16	GTS	86	(France) Larbre Compétition	(France) Patrice Goueslard (France) Christophe Bouchut (Switzerland) Steve Zacchia	Chrysler 8.0L V10	M	317	+60 Laps
17	GT	87	(United States) Orbit Racing	(United States) Leo Hindery Jr. (United States) Peter Baron (Germany) Marc Lieb	Porsche 911 GT3-RS	M	314	+63 Laps
17	GT	87	(United States) Orbit Racing	(United States) Leo Hindery Jr. (United States) Peter Baron (Germany) Marc Lieb	Porsche 3.6L Flat-6	M	314	+63 Laps
18	GT	75	(France) Thierry Perrier (France) Perspective Racing	(Belgium) Michel Neugarten (United Kingdom) Nigel Smith (United Kingdom) Ian Khan	Porsche 911 GT3-RS	P	305	+72 Laps
18	GT	75	(France) Thierry Perrier (France) Perspective Racing	(Belgium) Michel Neugarten (United Kingdom) Nigel Smith (United Kingdom) Ian Khan	Porsche 3.6L Flat-6	P	305	+72 Laps
19	GT	77	(Japan) Team Taisan Advan	(Japan) Atsushi Yogo (Japan) Akira Iida (Japan) Kazuyuki Nishizawa	Porsche 911 GT3-RS	Y	304	+73 Laps
19	GT	77	(Japan) Team Taisan Advan	(Japan) Atsushi Yogo (Japan) Akira Iida (Japan) Kazuyuki Nishizawa	Porsche 3.6L Flat-6	Y	304	+73 Laps
20	GT	81	(United States) The Racer's Group	(United States) Kevin Buckler (Germany) Timo Bernhard (Germany) Jörg Bergmeister	Porsche 911 GT3-RS	M	304	+73 Laps
20	GT	81	(United States) The Racer's Group	(United States) Kevin Buckler (Germany) Timo Bernhard (Germany) Jörg Bergmeister	Porsche 3.6L Flat-6	M	304	+73 Laps
21	GTS	72	(France) Luc Alphand Aventures	(France) Luc Alphand (France) Jérôme Policand (France) Frédéric Dor	Ferrari 550-GTS Maranello	M	298	+79 Laps
21	GTS	72	(France) Luc Alphand Aventures	(France) Luc Alphand (France) Jérôme Policand (France) Frédéric Dor	Ferrari F133 6.0L V12	M	298	+79 Laps
22	LMP675	26	(United Kingdom) RN Motorsport Ltd.	(Denmark) John Nielsen (Japan) Hayanari Shimoda (Denmark) Casper Elgaard	DBA4 03S	D	288	+89 Laps
22	LMP675	26	(United Kingdom) RN Motorsport Ltd.	(Denmark) John Nielsen (Japan) Hayanari Shimoda (Denmark) Casper Elgaard	Zytek ZG348 3.4L V8	D	288	+89 Laps
23	GT	78	(United Kingdom) PK Sport, Ltd.	(United Kingdom) Robin Liddell (United Kingdom) David Warnock (United Kingdom) Piers Masarati	Porsche 911 GT3-RS	P	285	+92 Laps
23	GT	78	(United Kingdom) PK Sport, Ltd.	(United Kingdom) Robin Liddell (United Kingdom) David Warnock (United Kingdom) Piers Masarati	Porsche 3.6L Flat-6	P	285	+92 Laps
24	LMP900	19	(Italy) Automotive Durango SRL	(France) Sylvain Boulay (Italy) Michele Rugolo (France) Jean-Bernard Bouvet	Durango LMP1	D	277	+100 Laps
24	LMP900	19	(Italy) Automotive Durango SRL	(France) Sylvain Boulay (Italy) Michele Rugolo (France) Jean-Bernard Bouvet	Judd GV4 4.0L V10	D	277	+100 Laps
25	GT	70	(France) JMB Racing	(France) David Terrien (Italy) Fabrizio De Simone (Italy) Fabio Babini	Ferrari 360 Modena GT	P	273	+104 Laps
25	GT	70	(France) JMB Racing	(France) David Terrien (Italy) Fabrizio De Simone (Italy) Fabio Babini	Ferrari F131 3.6L V8	P	273	+104 Laps
26	GT	94	(United States) Risi Competizione	(United States) Anthony Lazzaro (Germany) Ralf Kelleners (United States) Terry Borcheller	Ferrari 360 Modena GT	M	269	+108 Laps
26	GT	94	(United States) Risi Competizione	(United States) Anthony Lazzaro (Germany) Ralf Kelleners (United States) Terry Borcheller	Ferrari F131 3.6L V8	M	269	+108 Laps
27	GT	84	(Germany) T2M Motorsport	(Belgium) Vanina Ickx (France) Roland Bervillé (France) Patrick Bourdais	Porsche 911 GT3-RS	M	264	+113 Laps
27	GT	84	(Germany) T2M Motorsport	(Belgium) Vanina Ickx (France) Roland Bervillé (France) Patrick Bourdais	Porsche 3.6L Flat-6	M	264	+113 Laps
28 NC	GTS	64	(United Kingdom) Graham Nash Motorsport (United Kingdom) Ray Mallock Ltd.	(Portugal) Pedro Chaves (Brazil) Thomas Erdos (United Kingdom) Mike Newton	Saleen S7-R	D	292	Incomplete final lap (Engine)
28 NC	GTS	64	(United Kingdom) Graham Nash Motorsport (United Kingdom) Ray Mallock Ltd.	(Portugal) Pedro Chaves (Brazil) Thomas Erdos (United Kingdom) Mike Newton	Ford 7.0L V8	D	292	Incomplete final lap (Engine)
29 NC	LMP675	24	(France) Rachel Welter	(Japan) Yojiro Terada (France) Olivier Porta (United Kingdom) Gavin Pickering	WR LMP01	M	235	Insufficient distance
29 NC	LMP675	24	(France) Rachel Welter	(Japan) Yojiro Terada (France) Olivier Porta (United Kingdom) Gavin Pickering	Peugeot 2.0L Turbo I4	M	235	Insufficient distance
30 NC	GT	85	(Netherlands) ST Team Orange Spyker	(Germany) Norman Simon (Netherlands) Tom Coronel (Netherlands) Hans Hugenholtz	Spyker C8 Double-12R	D	229	Insufficient distance
30 NC	GT	85	(Netherlands) ST Team Orange Spyker	(Germany) Norman Simon (Netherlands) Tom Coronel (Netherlands) Hans Hugenholtz	Audi 4.0L V8	D	229	Insufficient distance
31 DNF	LMP900	16	(Netherlands) Racing for Holland	(Bolivia) Felipe Ortiz (Italy) Beppe Gabbiani (France) Tristan Gommendy	Dome S101	M	316	Accident
31 DNF	LMP900	16	(Netherlands) Racing for Holland	(Bolivia) Felipe Ortiz (Italy) Beppe Gabbiani (France) Tristan Gommendy	Judd GV4 4.0L V10	M	316	Accident
32 DNF	LMP900	12	(United States) JML Team Panoz	(Switzerland) Benjamin Leuenberger (Belgium) David Saelens (Canada) Scott Maxwell	Panoz LMP01 Evo	M	233	Accident
32 DNF	LMP900	12	(United States) JML Team Panoz	(Switzerland) Benjamin Leuenberger (Belgium) David Saelens (Canada) Scott Maxwell	Élan 6L8 6.0L V8	M	233	Accident
33 DNF	GTS	68	(France) Scorp Motorsport Communication	(France) Luis Marques (France) Olivier Thévenin (France) Dominique Dupuy	Chrysler Viper GTS-R	D	229	Engine
33 DNF	GTS	68	(France) Scorp Motorsport Communication	(France) Luis Marques (France) Olivier Thévenin (France) Dominique Dupuy	Chrysler 8.0L V10	D	229	Engine
34 DNF	GT	99	(France) XL Racing	(France) Ange Barde (France) Michel Ferté (France) Gaël Lasoudier	Ferrari 550 Maranello	P	227	Fire
34 DNF	GT	99	(France) XL Racing	(France) Ange Barde (France) Michel Ferté (France) Gaël Lasoudier	Ferrari F131 5.5L V12	P	227	Fire
35 DNF	LMP900	4	(United States) Riley & Scott Racing	(United States) Jim Matthews (Belgium) Marc Goossens (France) Christophe Tinseau	Riley & Scott Mk III C	M	214	Engine
35 DNF	LMP900	4	(United States) Riley & Scott Racing	(United States) Jim Matthews (Belgium) Marc Goossens (France) Christophe Tinseau	Ford (Yates) 6.0L V8	M	214	Engine
36 DNF	LMP675	25	(France) Gerard Welter	(France) Bastien Brière (France) Jean-René de Fournoux (France) Stéphane Daoudi	WR LMP02	M	176	Engine
36 DNF	LMP675	25	(France) Gerard Welter	(France) Bastien Brière (France) Jean-René de Fournoux (France) Stéphane Daoudi	Peugeot 3.0L V6	M	176	Engine
37 DNF	GTS	80	(United Kingdom) Veloqx Prodrive Racing	(United Kingdom) Anthony Davidson (United Kingdom) Kelvin Burt (United Kingdom) Darren Turner	Ferrari 550-GTS Maranello	M	176	Accident
37 DNF	GTS	80	(United Kingdom) Veloqx Prodrive Racing	(United Kingdom) Anthony Davidson (United Kingdom) Kelvin Burt (United Kingdom) Darren Turner	Ferrari F131 5.9L V12	M	176	Accident
38 DNF	LMP900	14	(United Kingdom) Team Nasamax (United Kingdom) McNeil Engineering	(France) Romain Dumas (Canada) Robbie Stirling (South Africa) Werner Lupberger	Reynard 01Q	G	138	Fire
38 DNF	LMP900	14	(United Kingdom) Team Nasamax (United Kingdom) McNeil Engineering	(France) Romain Dumas (Canada) Robbie Stirling (South Africa) Werner Lupberger	Cosworth XDE 2.7L Turbo V8 (Bioethanol)	G	138	Fire
39 DNF	GT	95	(United States) Risi Competizione	(United States) Shane Lewis (United States) Butch Leitzinger (United Kingdom) Johnny Mowlem	Ferrari 360 Modena GT	Y	138	Engine
39 DNF	GT	95	(United States) Risi Competizione	(United States) Shane Lewis (United States) Butch Leitzinger (United Kingdom) Johnny Mowlem	Ferrari F133 3.6L V8	Y	138	Engine
40 DNF	GT	83	(Germany) Seikel Motorsport	(Canada) Anthony Burgess (Canada) David Shep (New Zealand) Andrew Bagnall	Porsche 911 GT3-RS	Y	134	Gearbox
40 DNF	GT	83	(Germany) Seikel Motorsport	(Canada) Anthony Burgess (Canada) David Shep (New Zealand) Andrew Bagnall	Porsche 3.6L Flat-6	Y	134	Gearbox
41 DNF	LMP675	27	(United States) Intersport Racing	(United States) Jon Field (United States) Duncan Dayton (United States) Rick Sutherland	MG-Lola EX257	G	107	Engine
41 DNF	LMP675	27	(United States) Intersport Racing	(United States) Jon Field (United States) Duncan Dayton (United States) Rick Sutherland	MG (AER) XP20 2.0L Turbo I4	G	107	Engine
42 DNF	GT	92	(United Kingdom) DeWalt Racesports Salisbury	(United Kingdom) Mike Jordan (United Kingdom) Michael Caine (United Kingdom) Tim Sugden	TVR Tuscan T400R	D	93	Gearbox
42 DNF	GT	92	(United Kingdom) DeWalt Racesports Salisbury	(United Kingdom) Mike Jordan (United Kingdom) Michael Caine (United Kingdom) Tim Sugden	TVR Speed Six 4.0L I6	D	93	Gearbox
43 DNF	GTS	66	(Germany) Konrad Motorsport	(Austria) Franz Konrad (Switzerland) Toni Seiler (Switzerland) Walter Brun	Saleen S7-R	D	91	Gearbox
43 DNF	GTS	66	(Germany) Konrad Motorsport	(Austria) Franz Konrad (Switzerland) Toni Seiler (Switzerland) Walter Brun	Ford 7.0L V8	D	91	Gearbox
44 DNF	LMP900	21	(France) Edouard Sezionale	(France) Patrice Roussel (France) Edouard Sezionale (France) Lucas Lasserre	Norma M2000-2	D	82	Engine
44 DNF	LMP900	21	(France) Edouard Sezionale	(France) Patrice Roussel (France) Edouard Sezionale (France) Lucas Lasserre	Ford (Roush) 6.0L V8	D	82	Engine
45 DNF	LMP675	31	(France) Courage Compétition	(France) David Hallyday (France) Philippe Alliot (Sweden) Carl Rosenblad	Courage C65	M	41	Engine
45 DNF	LMP675	31	(France) Courage Compétition	(France) David Hallyday (France) Philippe Alliot (Sweden) Carl Rosenblad	JPX 3.4L V6	M	41	Engine
46 DNF	LMP900	10	(United Kingdom) Audi Sport UK (United Kingdom) Arena Motorsport	(Germany) Frank Biela (United Kingdom) Perry McCarthy (Finland) Mika Salo	Audi R8	M	28	Fuel
46 DNF	LMP900	10	(United Kingdom) Audi Sport UK (United Kingdom) Arena Motorsport	(Germany) Frank Biela (United Kingdom) Perry McCarthy (Finland) Mika Salo	Audi 3.6L Turbo V8	M	28	Fuel
47 DNF	LMP675	23	(United States) Team Bucknum Racing	(United States) Jeff Bucknum (United States) Bryan Willman (United States) Chris McMurry	Pilbeam MP91	D	27	Engine
47 DNF	LMP675	23	(United States) Team Bucknum Racing	(United States) Jeff Bucknum (United States) Bryan Willman (United States) Chris McMurry	JPX 3.4L V6	D	27	Engine
48 DNF	GT	91	(United Kingdom) DeWalt Racesport Salisbury	(United Kingdom) Rob Barff (United Kingdom) Richard Hay (United Kingdom) Richard Stanton	TVR Tuscan T400R	D	11	Crash
48 DNF	GT	91	(United Kingdom) DeWalt Racesport Salisbury	(United Kingdom) Rob Barff (United Kingdom) Richard Hay (United Kingdom) Richard Stanton	TVR Speed Six 4.0L I6	D	11	Crash
49 DNF	GTS	61	(United States) Carsport America	(Netherlands) Mike Hezemans (Belgium) Anthony Kumpen (Netherlands) David Hart	Pagani Zonda GR	P	10	Gearbox
49 DNF	GTS	61	(United States) Carsport America	(Netherlands) Mike Hezemans (Belgium) Anthony Kumpen (Netherlands) David Hart	Mercedes-Benz AMG 6.0L V12	P	10	Gearbox
DNS	LMP900	20	(United Kingdom) Lister Racing	(United Kingdom) Jamie Campbell-Walter (United Kingdom) Nathan Kinch (Belgium) Vincent Vosse	Lister Storm LMP	D	–	Did not start
DNS	LMP900	20	(United Kingdom) Lister Racing	(United Kingdom) Jamie Campbell-Walter (United Kingdom) Nathan Kinch (Belgium) Vincent Vosse	Chevrolet LS1 6.0L V8	D	–	Did not start

Tyre manufacturers
Key
Symbol	Tyre manufacturer
D	Dunlop
G	Goodyear
M	Michelin
P	Pirelli
Y	Yokohama
