= 2002 Grand Prix of Sonoma =

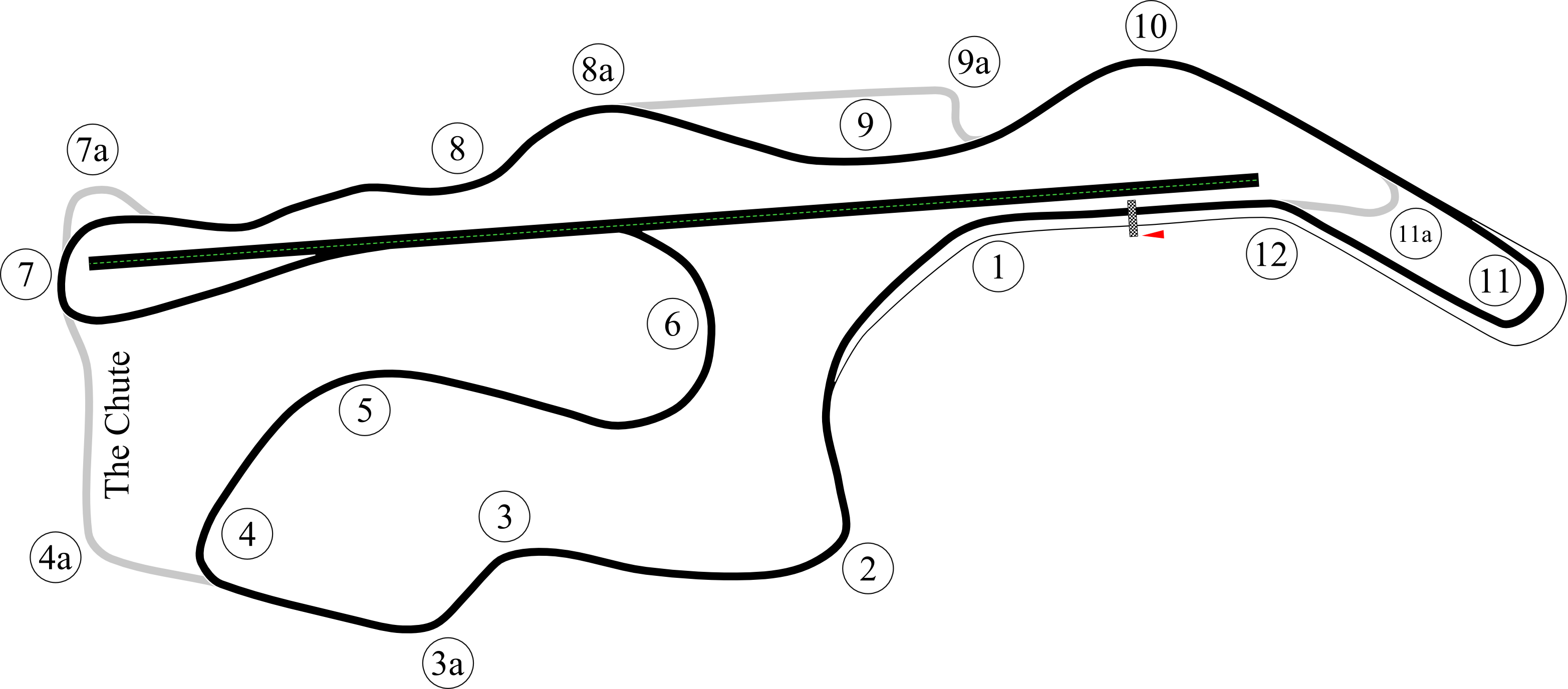
Sonoma Raceway

The 2002 Grand Prix of Sonoma was the second round of the 2002 American Le Mans Series season. It took place at Infineon Raceway, California, on May 19, 2002.

== Official results ==
Class winners in bold.

Pos	Class	No	Team	Drivers	Chassis	Tyre	Laps
Pos	Class	No	Team	Drivers	Engine	Tyre	Laps
1	**LMP900**	**50**	**(United States) Panoz Motor Sports**	**(Australia) David Brabham (Denmark) Jan Magnussen**	**Panoz LMP01 Evo**	M	**83**
1	**LMP900**	**50**	**(United States) Panoz Motor Sports**	**(Australia) David Brabham (Denmark) Jan Magnussen**	**Élan 6L8 6.0L V8**	M	**83**
2	LMP900	38	(United States) Champion Racing	(United Kingdom) Johnny Herbert (Denmark) Tom Kristensen	Audi R8	M	83
2	LMP900	38	(United States) Champion Racing	(United Kingdom) Johnny Herbert (Denmark) Tom Kristensen	Audi 3.6L Turbo V8	M	83
3	LMP900	51	(United States) Panoz Motor Sports	(United States) Bryan Herta (United States) Bill Auberlen	Panoz LMP01 Evo	M	82
3	LMP900	51	(United States) Panoz Motor Sports	(United States) Bryan Herta (United States) Bill Auberlen	Élan 6L8 6.0L V8	M	82
4	LMP900	16	(United States) Dyson Racing Team	(United States) Chris Dyson (United Kingdom) James Weaver	Riley & Scott Mk III	G	81
4	LMP900	16	(United States) Dyson Racing Team	(United States) Chris Dyson (United Kingdom) James Weaver	Lincoln (Élan) 6.0L V8	G	81
5	**GTS**	**3**	**(United States) Corvette Racing**	**(Canada) Ron Fellows (United States) Johnny O'Connell**	**Chevrolet Corvette C5-R**	G	**81**
5	**GTS**	**3**	**(United States) Corvette Racing**	**(Canada) Ron Fellows (United States) Johnny O'Connell**	**Chevrolet 7.0L V8**	G	**81**
6	**GT**	**23**	**(United States) Alex Job Racing**	**(Germany) Sascha Maassen (Germany) Lucas Luhr**	**Porsche 911 GT3-RS**	M	**80**
6	**GT**	**23**	**(United States) Alex Job Racing**	**(Germany) Sascha Maassen (Germany) Lucas Luhr**	Porsche 3.6L Flat-6	M	**80**
7	GTS	4	(United States) Corvette Racing	(United States) Andy Pilgrim (United States) Kelly Collins	Chevrolet Corvette C5-R	G	80
7	GTS	4	(United States) Corvette Racing	(United States) Andy Pilgrim (United States) Kelly Collins	Chevrolet 7.0L V8	G	80
8	LMP900	30	(United States) Intersport	(United States) John Macaluso (United States) Mark Neuhaus	Lola B2K/10B	G	80
8	LMP900	30	(United States) Intersport	(United States) John Macaluso (United States) Mark Neuhaus	Judd GV4 4.0L V10	G	80
9	LMP900	18	(United States) MBD Sportscar	(Canada) John Graham (Belgium) Didier de Radigues	Panoz LMP07	G	79
9	LMP900	18	(United States) MBD Sportscar	(Canada) John Graham (Belgium) Didier de Radigues	Mugen MF408S 4.0L V8	G	79
10	LMP900	17	(United States) MBD Sportscar	(Canada) Scott Maxwell (Venezuela) Milka Duno	Panoz LMP07	G	79
10	LMP900	17	(United States) MBD Sportscar	(Canada) Scott Maxwell (Venezuela) Milka Duno	Mugen MF408S 4.0L V8	G	79
11	GT	66	(United States) The Racer's Group	(United States) Kevin Buckler (United Kingdom) Marino Franchitti	Porsche 911 GT3-RS	M	79
11	GT	66	(United States) The Racer's Group	(United States) Kevin Buckler (United Kingdom) Marino Franchitti	Porsche 3.6L Flat-6	M	79
12	GT	22	(United States) Alex Job Racing	(Germany) Timo Bernhard (Germany) Jörg Bergmeister	Porsche 911 GT3-RS	M	79
12	GT	22	(United States) Alex Job Racing	(Germany) Timo Bernhard (Germany) Jörg Bergmeister	Porsche 3.6L Flat-6	M	79
13	GT	79	(United States) J-3 Racing	(United States) Justin Jackson (United States) Mike Fitzgerald	Porsche 911 GT3-RS	D	77
13	GT	79	(United States) J-3 Racing	(United States) Justin Jackson (United States) Mike Fitzgerald	Porsche 3.6L Flat-6	D	77
14	LMP900	1	(Germany) Audi Sport North America	(Italy) Rinaldo Capello (Italy) Emanuele Pirro (Germany) Frank Biela	Audi R8	M	77
14	LMP900	1	(Germany) Audi Sport North America	(Italy) Rinaldo Capello (Italy) Emanuele Pirro (Germany) Frank Biela	Audi 3.6L Turbo V8	M	77
15	GTS	26	(Germany) Konrad Motorsport	(Austria) Franz Konrad (United States) Terry Borcheller	Saleen S7-R	P	76
15	GTS	26	(Germany) Konrad Motorsport	(Austria) Franz Konrad (United States) Terry Borcheller	Ford 7.0L V8	P	76
16	GT	43	(United States) Orbit	(United States) Leo Hindery (United States) Peter Baron	Porsche 911 GT3-RS	M	76
16	GT	43	(United States) Orbit	(United States) Leo Hindery (United States) Peter Baron	Porsche 3.6L Flat-6	M	76
17	GT	42	(United States) Orbit	(United States) Gary Schultheis (United States) Tony Kester	Porsche 911 GT3-RS	M	76
17	GT	42	(United States) Orbit	(United States) Gary Schultheis (United States) Tony Kester	Porsche 3.6L Flat-6	M	76
18	**LMP675**	**13**	**(United States) Archangel Motorsports**	**(United States) Dave McEntee (United Kingdom) Ben Devlin**	**Lola B2K/40**	D	**75**
18	**LMP675**	**13**	**(United States) Archangel Motorsports**	**(United States) Dave McEntee (United Kingdom) Ben Devlin**	**Ford (Millington) 2.0L Turbo I4**	D	**75**
19	GT	89	(Canada) Porschehaus Racing	(Canada) Robert Julien (United States) Adam Merzon	Porsche 911 GT3-RS	D	75
19	GT	89	(Canada) Porschehaus Racing	(Canada) Robert Julien (United States) Adam Merzon	Porsche 3.6L Flat-6	D	75
20	GT	52	(Germany) Seikel Motorsport	(United States) Hugh Plumb (United States) Philip Collin (Canada) Tony Burgess	Porsche 911 GT3-R	Y	74
20	GT	52	(Germany) Seikel Motorsport	(United States) Hugh Plumb (United States) Philip Collin (Canada) Tony Burgess	Porsche 3.6L Flat-6	Y	74
21	LMP675	11	(United States) KnightHawk Racing	(United States) Chad Block (United States) Steven Knight	MG-Lola EX257	A	73
21	LMP675	11	(United States) KnightHawk Racing	(United States) Chad Block (United States) Steven Knight	MG (AER) XP20 2.0L Turbo I4	A	73
22	LMP675	37	(United States) Intersport	(United States) Jon Field (United States) Rick Sutherland	MG-Lola EX257	G	72
22	LMP675	37	(United States) Intersport	(United States) Jon Field (United States) Rick Sutherland	MG (AER) XP20 2.0L Turbo I4	G	72
23	GT	31	(United States) Petersen Motorsports	(United States) Randy Pobst (United Kingdom) Johnny Mowlem	Porsche 911 GT3-RS	Y	69
23	GT	31	(United States) Petersen Motorsports	(United States) Randy Pobst (United Kingdom) Johnny Mowlem	Porsche 3.6L Flat-6	Y	69
24	GT	99	(United States) Schumacher Racing	(United States) Larry Schumacher (United States) David Murry	Porsche 911 GT3-RS	D	62
24	GT	99	(United States) Schumacher Racing	(United States) Larry Schumacher (United States) David Murry	Porsche 3.6L Flat-6	D	62
25	LMP675	62	(United States) Team Spencer Motorsports	(United States) Ryan Hampton (United States) Rich Grupp	Lola B2K/42	A	55
25	LMP675	62	(United States) Team Spencer Motorsports	(United States) Ryan Hampton (United States) Rich Grupp	Mazda 1.3L 2-Rotor	A	55
26 DNF	GTS	45	(United States) American Viperacing	(United States) Shane Lewis (United States) Spencer Trenery	Dodge Viper GTS-R	P	52
26 DNF	GTS	45	(United States) American Viperacing	(United States) Shane Lewis (United States) Spencer Trenery	Dodge 8.0L V10	P	52
27 DNF	GT	67	(United States) The Racer's Group	(United States) Vic Rice (United States) Robert Orcutt	Porsche 911 GT3-RS	M	43
27 DNF	GT	67	(United States) The Racer's Group	(United States) Vic Rice (United States) Robert Orcutt	Porsche 3.6L Flat-6	M	43
28 DNF	GTS	44	(United States) American Viperacing	(United States) Marc Bunting (United States) Tom Weickardt	Dodge Viper GTS-R	P	41
28 DNF	GTS	44	(United States) American Viperacing	(United States) Marc Bunting (United States) Tom Weickardt	Dodge 8.0L V10	P	41
DSQ^{†}	GTS	0	(Italy) Team Olive Garden	(Italy) Mimmo Schiattarella (Italy) Emanuele Naspetti	Ferrari 550 Maranello	M	79
DSQ^{†}	GTS	0	(Italy) Team Olive Garden	(Italy) Mimmo Schiattarella (Italy) Emanuele Naspetti	Ferrari 6.0L V12	M	79
DNS	LMP900	49	(United States) Panoz Motor Sports	(United States) Gunnar Jeannette (United States) David Donohue	Panoz LMP-1 Roadster-S	M	-
DNS	LMP900	49	(United States) Panoz Motor Sports	(United States) Gunnar Jeannette (United States) David Donohue	Élan 6L8 6.0L V8	M	-
DNS	LMP675	55	(United States) Team Bucknum Racing	(United States) Chris McMurry (United States) Bryan Willman	Pilbeam MP84	A	-
DNS	LMP675	55	(United States) Team Bucknum Racing	(United States) Chris McMurry (United States) Bryan Willman	Nissan (AER) VQL 3.0L V6	A	-
DNS	LMP675	56	(United States) Team Bucknum Racing	(United States) Jeff Bucknum (Belgium) Bruno Lambert	Pilbeam MP84	A	-
DNS	LMP675	56	(United States) Team Bucknum Racing	(United States) Jeff Bucknum (Belgium) Bruno Lambert	Nissan (AER) VQL 3.0L V6	A	-
DNS	GT	88	(Canada) Porschehaus Racing	(Canada) Peter Overing (Canada) Stephane Veilleux	Porsche 911 GT3-R	D	-
DNS	GT	88	(Canada) Porschehaus Racing	(Canada) Peter Overing (Canada) Stephane Veilleux	Porsche 3.6L Flat-6	D	-

† - #0 Team Olive Garden was disqualified for failing post-race technical inspection. The car used an illegal air restrictor

== Statistics ==
- Pole Position - #38 Champion Racing - 1:22.615
- Fastest Lap - #37 Intersport Racing - 1:26.247
- Distance - 337.946 km
- Average Speed - 122.635 km/h

American Le Mans Series
Previous race: 2002 12 Hours of Sebring	2002 season	Next race: 2002 American Le Mans at Mid-Ohio
