= David Murry =

American racing driver

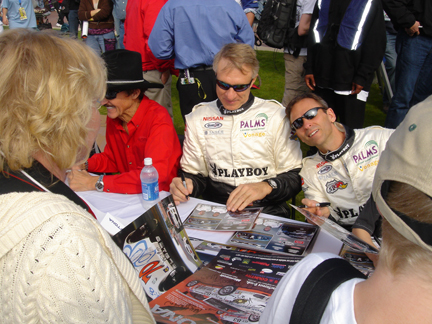
- Murry (right) in 2007
- Nationality: (United States) American
- Born: January 29, 1957 (age 69) New Orleans, Louisiana, U.S.
- Relatives: Dylan Murry (son)

NASCAR Cup Series career
- 1 race run over 1 year
- Best finish: 67th (1999)
- First race: 1999 Frontier @ the Glen (Watkins Glen)
Wins	Top tens	Poles
0	0	0

ARCA Menards Series career
- 3 races run over 3 years
- First race: 1993 Jiffy Lube 500K (Atlanta)
- Last race: 1998 ARCA Pepsi 400k (Pocono)
Wins	Top tens	Poles
0	0	0
- Statistics up to date as of November 6, 2024.

David Keith Murry (born January 29, 1957) is an American former professional auto racing driver. He is best known for his Rolex Sports Car Series exploits, having risen through the IMSA GT Championship ranks in the 1980s and 1990s. He also previously competed in the NASCAR Nextel Cup Series.

Murry was part of Porsche's LMP1 program at the 1998 24 Hours of Le Mans, and finished third overall at the 2003 24 Hours of Daytona in a Rennwerks Motorsports Porsche 996 GT3-R. He later joined small family team Robertson Racing in ALMS in a Ford GT, scoring a shock pole position at the 2009 Petit Le Mans in GT2 and a podium at the 2011 24 Hours of Le Mans in GTE Am.

Since 2009, Murry runs a nationwide track day business from his home in Atlanta, Georgia.

Murry's son Dylan is also a racing driver.

== Motorsports career results ==
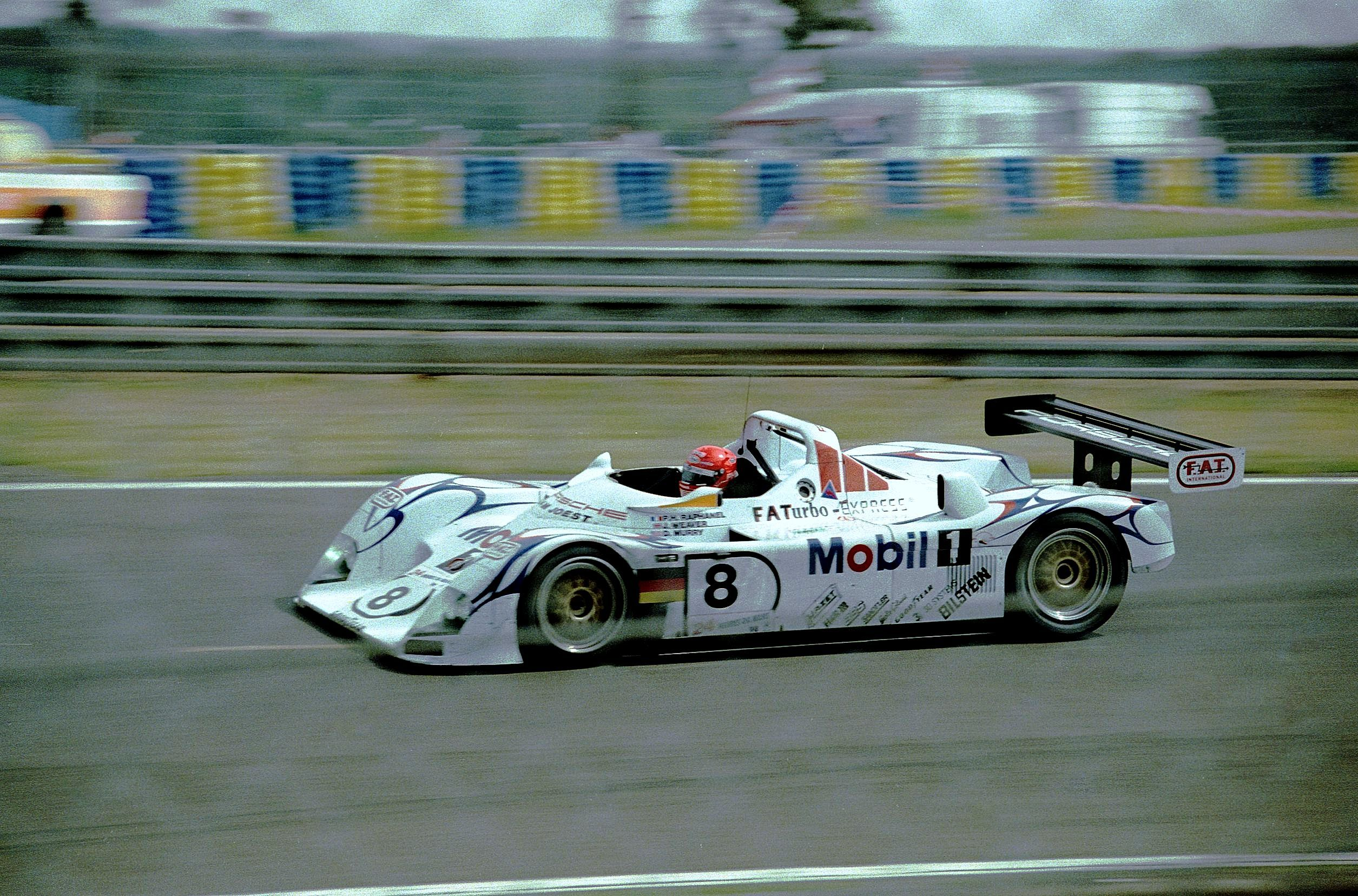
Murry's Porsche LMP1-98 at the 1998 24 Hours of Le Mans.

=== NASCAR ===
(key) (Bold - Pole position awarded by qualifying time. Italics - Pole position earned by points standings or practice time. * – Most laps led.)

==== Nextel Cup Series ====
NASCAR Nextel Cup Series results
Year	Team	No.	Make	1	2	3	4	5	6	7	8	9	10	11	12	13	14	15	16	17	18	19	20	21	22	23	24	25	26	27	28	29	30	31	32	33	34	35	36	NNCC	Pts	Ref
1995	Phoenix Air Racing	61	Ford	DAY	CAR	RCH	ATL	DAR	BRI	NWS	MAR	TAL	SON	CLT	DOV	POC	MCH	DAY	NHA	POC	TAL	IND	GLN; DNQ	MCH	BRI	DAR	RCH	DOV	MAR	NWS	CLT	CAR	PHO	ATL						N/A	0	
1999	Phoenix Air Racing	61	Ford	DAY	CAR	LVS	ATL	DAR	TEX	BRI	MAR	TAL	CAL	RCH	CLT	DOV	MCH	POC	SON; Wth	DAY	NHA	POC	IND	GLN; 39	MCH	BRI	DAR	RCH	NHA	DOV	MAR	CLT	TAL	CAR	PHO	HOM	ATL			67th	46	
2006	R&J Racing	37	Dodge	DAY	CAL	LVS	ATL	BRI	MAR	TEX	PHO	TAL	RCH	DAR	CLT	DOV	POC	MCH	SON	DAY	CHI	NHA	POC	IND	GLN; DNQ	MCH	BRI	CAL	RCH	NHA	DOV	KAN	TAL	CLT	MAR	ATL	TEX	PHO	HOM	N/A	0	

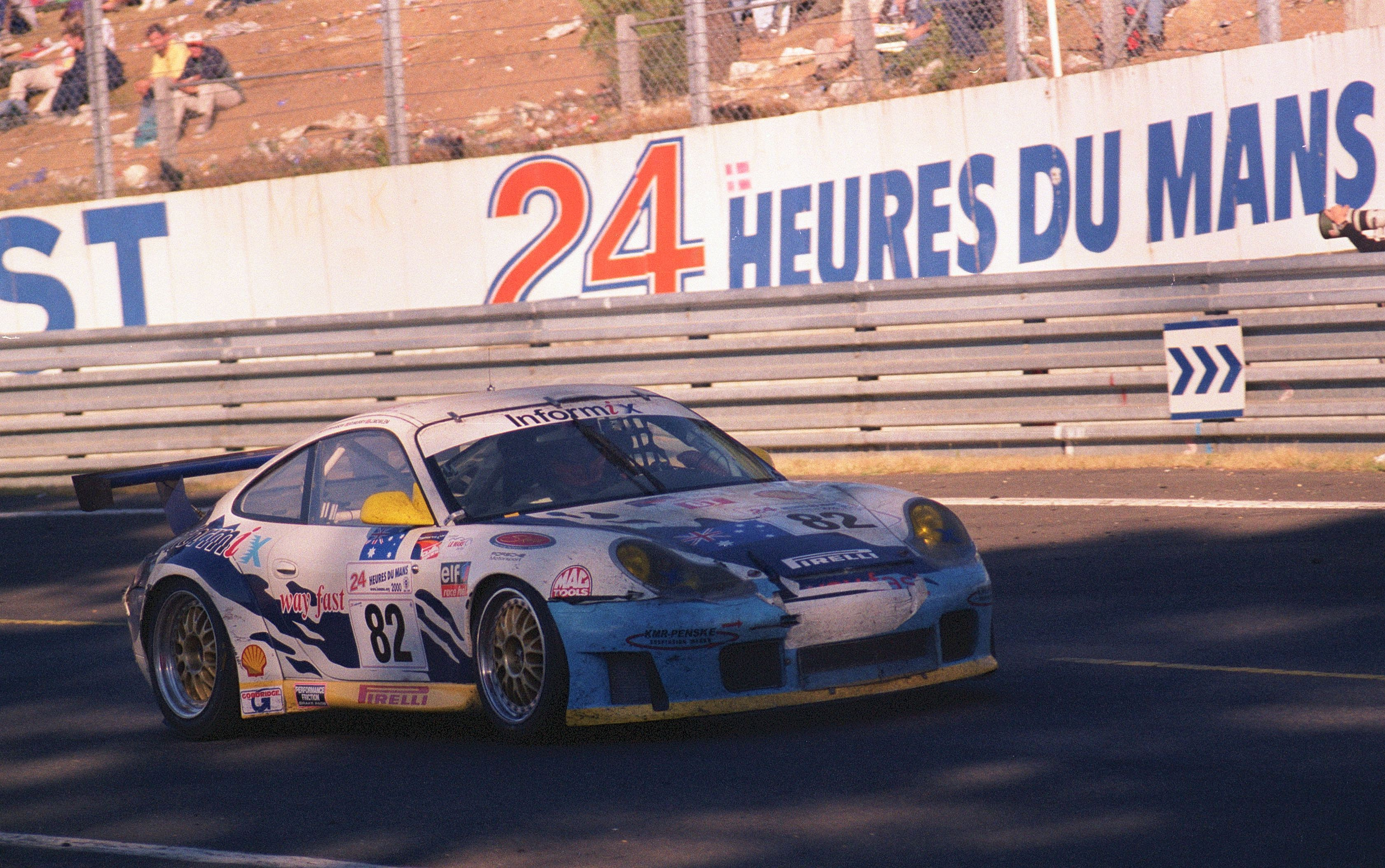
Murry's Porsche 996 GT3-R in 2000, the scene of his first Le Mans podium.

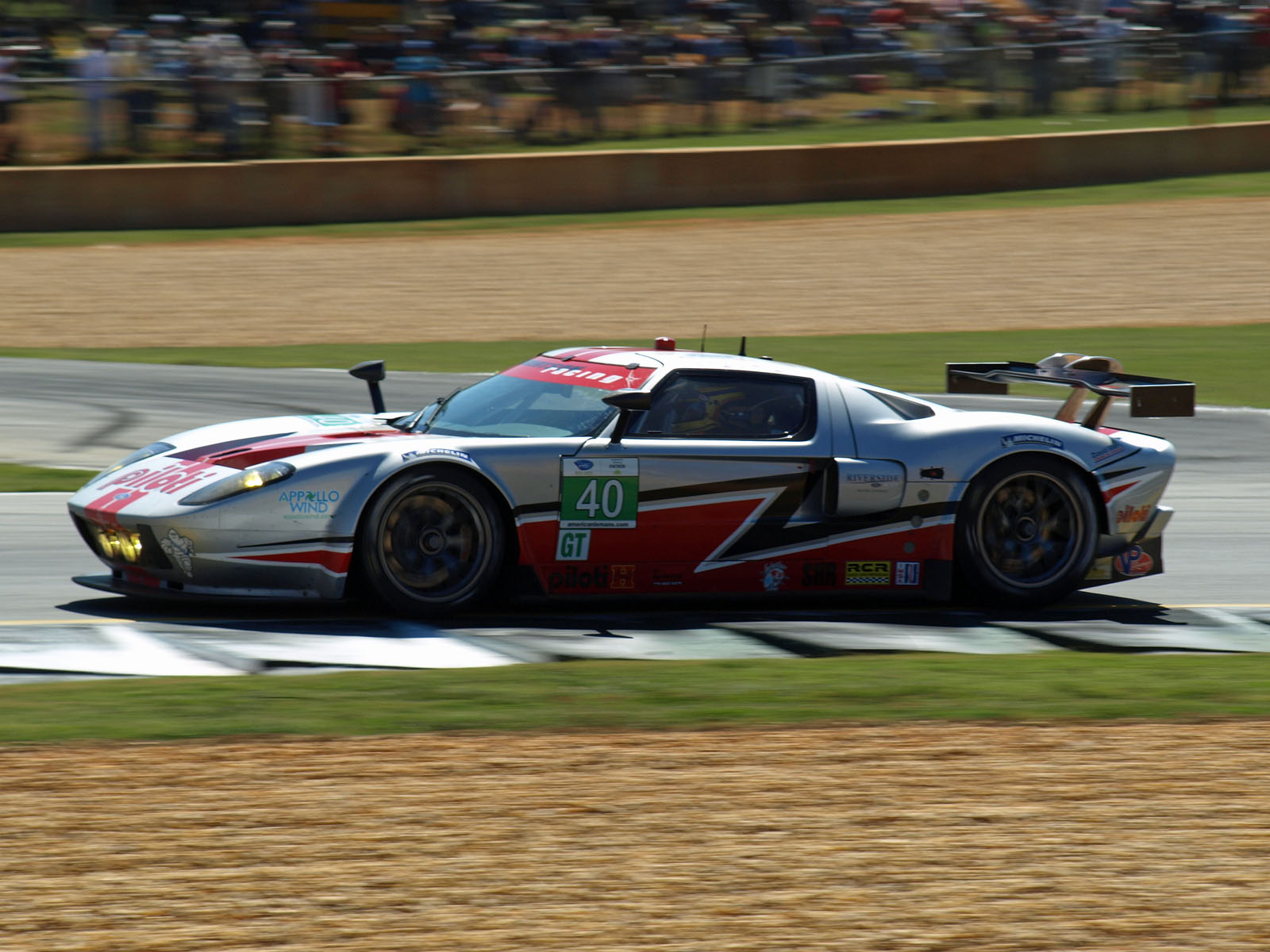
Murry put Robertson Racing's Ford GT on pole at Road Atlanta in 2009.

=== ARCA Bondo/Mar-Hyde Series ===
(key) (Bold – Pole position awarded by qualifying time. Italics – Pole position earned by points standings or practice time. * – Most laps led. ** – All laps led.)

ARCA Bondo/Mar-Hyde Series results
Year	Team	No.	Make	1	2	3	4	5	6	7	8	9	10	11	12	13	14	15	16	17	18	19	20	21	22	ABMHSC	Pts	Ref
1993	Wayne Peterson Racing	06	Pontiac	DAY	FIF	TWS	TAL	KIL	CMS	FRS	TOL	POC	MCH	FRS	POC	KIL	ISF	DSF	TOL	SLM	WIN	ATL; 40				N/A	0	
1994	Phoenix Air Racing	66	Olds	DAY	TAL	FIF	LVL	KIL	TOL	FRS	MCH	DMS; 20	POC	POC	KIL	FRS	INF	I70	ISF	DSF	TOL	SLM	WIN	ATL		N/A	0	
1998	Phoenix Air Racing	66	Ford	DAY	ATL	SLM	CLT	MEM	MCH	POC	SBS	TOL	PPR	POC; 32	KIL	FRS	ISF	ATL	DSF	SLM	TEX	WIN	CLT	TAL	ATL	N/A	0	

=== 24 Hours of Le Mans results ===
Year	Team	Co-Drivers	Car	Class	Laps	Pos.	Class Pos.
1998	(Germany) Porsche AG (Germany) Joest Racing	(France) Pierre-Henri Raphanel (United Kingdom) James Weaver	Porsche LMP1-98	LMP1	218	DNF	DNF
2000	(Australia) Skea Racing International	(Germany) Sascha Maassen (United Kingdom) Johnny Mowlem	Porsche 911 GT3-R	LMGT	304	17th	**2nd**
2001	(United States) Dick Barbour Racing	(Venezuela) Milka Duno (Canada) John Graham	Reynard 01Q-Judd	LMP675	4	DNF	DNF
2011	(United States) Robertson Racing LLC	(United States) Andrea Robertson (United States) Andrea Robertson	Ford GT-R Mk. VII	LMGTE Am	285	26th	**3rd**
