= Reynard 2KQ =

Racing automobile

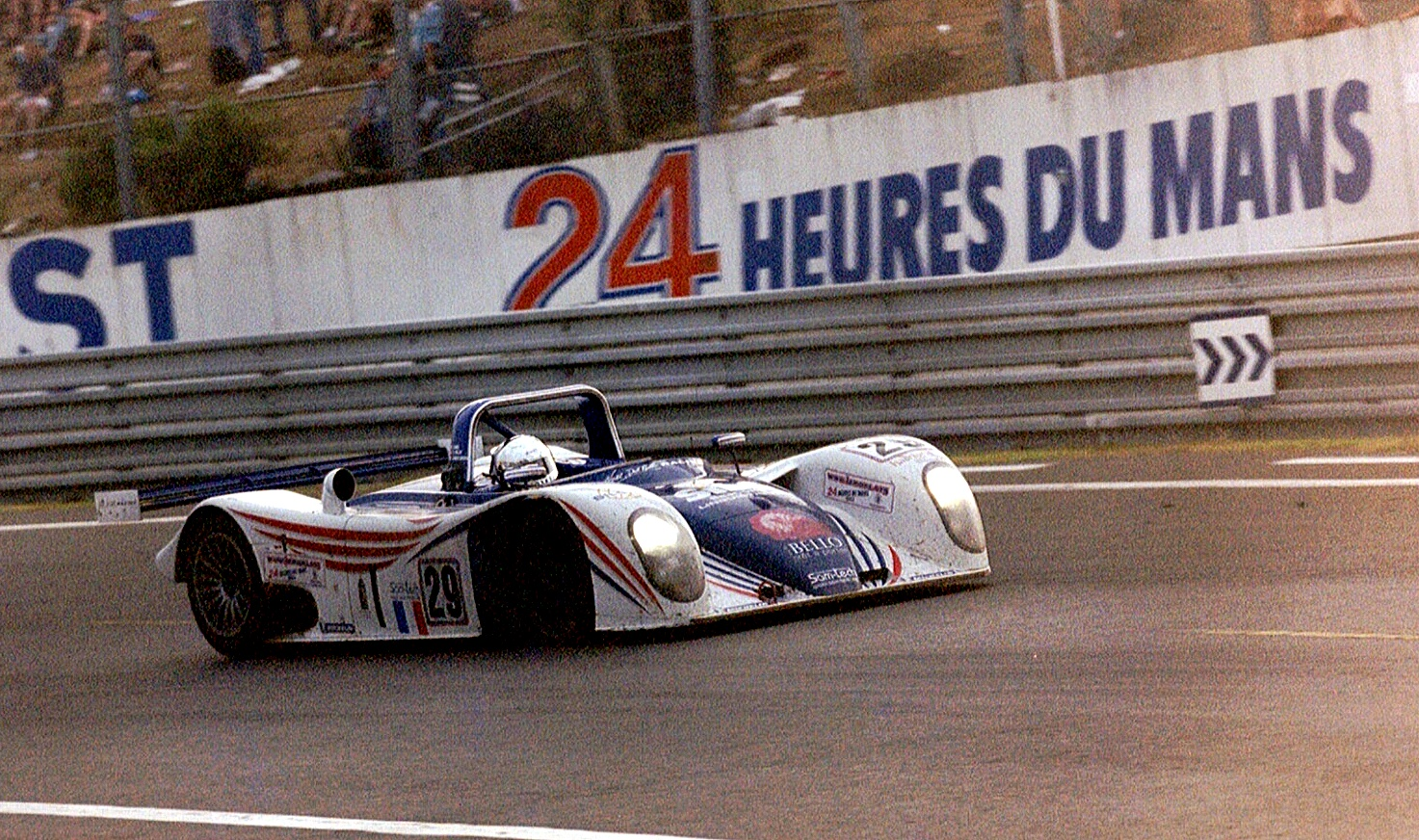
- Category: LMP900; LMP675
- Designers: Paul Brown; Kieron Salter; Nigel Stroud
- Successor: Reynard 01Q

Technical specifications
- Chassis: Carbon fiber and aluminum honeycomb monocoque chassis
- Suspension: Unequal length wishbones, pushrod actuated coil springs over shock absorbers, inboard rocker arms
- Length: 4,650 mm (183 in)
- Width: 1,990 mm (78 in)
- Axle track: 1,618 mm (63.7 in) (front); 1,602 mm (63.1 in) (rear)
- Wheelbase: 2,740 mm (108 in)
- Engine: Judd GV4 4.0 L (244.1 cu in) 72° DOHC V10 naturally-aspirated mid-engined Chrysler/Mopar 6.0 L (366.1 cu in) 90° OHV V8 naturally-aspirated mid-engined Ford-Cosworth XFE 2.65 L (161.7 cu in) 90° DOHC V8 turbocharged mid-engined Ford 5.5 L (335.6 cu in) 90° DOHC V8 naturally-aspirated mid-engined Judd KV675 3.4 L (207.5 cu in) 90° DOHC V8 naturally-aspirated mid-engined VW A59 HPT16 2.0 L (122.0 cu in) DOHC I4 turbocharged mid-engined Nicholson-Mclaren 3.3–3.4 L (201.4–207.5 cu in) 80° DOHC V8 naturally-aspirated mid-engined
- Transmission: Xtrac 6-speed sequential
- Power: 450–850 hp (340–630 kW)
- Weight: 720–788 kg (1,587–1,737 lb) (LMP675); 900–940 kg (1,980–2,070 lb) (LMP900)

Competition history
- Debut: 2000 24 Hours of Daytona
- Last event: 2004 24 Hours of Le Mans
Races	Wins	Podiums	Poles
19	0	1	0

The Reynard 2KQ was a Le Mans prototype built by Reynard Motorsport and used by various racing teams in sports car racing from 2000 to 2004.

== Development history and technology ==
The 2KQ was originally developed as the LMP900 vehicle in late 1999. The LMP900 class was the major prototype racing class in the Le Mans 24 Hours and American Le Mans Series in the early 2000s. However, during development, Reynard decided to also launch the prototype for the smaller LMP675 class in order to be able to address a larger customer base. The main distinguishing features of the carbon and aluminum monocoque-equipped racing cars were engine power and weight. The LM675 cars, which weigh only around 760 kg (the weight limits were constantly being adjusted at Le Mans – 2000: 765 kg, 2001: 788 kg, 2002: 759 kg, 2003 and 2004: 761 kg) featured 2-liter 4- Cylinder engines used. The LMP900 vehicles, which weighed around 940 kg, had 4-liter 10-cylinder or 8-cylinder mid-mounted engines.

The first vehicles were delivered to the customer teams as early as January 2000. The 2KQ made its racing debut in the LMP900 version at the 24 Hours of Daytona in February of the same year. The car - which was entered by Johansson Matthews Racing - was driven by team owners Stefan Johansson and Jim Matthews. The British Guy Smith and the American Mimo Gidley were hired for this. The Johansson-Matthews 2KQ was powered by a Judd GV4 10-cylinder engine. In the race, after many technical problems, the quartet finished 23rd overall after starting from fourth on the grid.

== Racing history ==
For the 2000 Le Mans 24-hour race, the vehicles were not only given the additional designation LM, which meant that the racing cars were in the starting lists as 2KQ-LM but also improved rear wings. A total of five 2KQs were at the start. Two were entered by ORECA in the LPM900 class, plus the Johansson-Matthews car, also in the large prototype class. However, the first Le Mans race for these vehicles was not really successful. Yannick Dalmas got stuck in one of the ORECA-2KQs in the first lap due to a lack of oil pressure. The second ORECA car, driven by Didier André, Didier Theys, and Jeffrey Van Hooydonkdid not get past 20th place overall. The US car also retired after an engine failure. The ORECA cars were powered by an 8-cylinder Chrysler engine. The French ROC team entered two 2KQ in the LMP675 class. This was the first appearance of the Volkswagen brand in the 24-hour race. A 2-liter VW 4-cylinder engine ran in both Spyders. However, both cars failed due to engine failure.

After ORECA switched to the Dallara SP1 in 2001, the 2KQ disappeared from the large prototype class. However, ROC and Noël del Bello trusted in the vehicle until the end of 2004 and continued to use it in the LMP675 class. The greatest success for the 2KQ was class victory at the 2001 Le Mans 24-hour race. Jordi Gené, Jean-Denis Delétraz, and Pascal Fabre finished fifth overall in a ROC-2KQ.
