= Reynard 01Q =

Sports prototype race car

- Category: LMP675/SR2; LMP900
- Designers: Paul Brown; Nigel Stroud
- Predecessor: Reynard 2KQ
- Successor: Reynard 02S

Technical specifications
- Chassis: Carbon fiber and aluminum honeycomb monocoque chassis
- Suspension: Unequal length wishbones, pushrod actuated coil springs over shock absorbers, inboard rocker arms
- Length: 4,650 mm (183 in)
- Width: 1,990 mm (78 in)
- Axle track: 1,618 mm (63.7 in) (front); 1,602 mm (63.1 in) (rear)
- Wheelbase: 2,740 mm (108 in)
- Engine: Judd GV4 4.0 L (244.1 cu in) 72° DOHC V10 naturally-aspirated mid-engined Judd KV675 3.4 L (207.5 cu in) 90° DOHC V8 naturally-aspirated mid-engined VW A59 HPT16 2.0 L (122.0 cu in) DOHC I4 turbocharged mid-engined Nicholson-Mclaren 3.3–3.4 L (201.4–207.5 cu in) 80° DOHC V8 naturally-aspirated mid-engined
- Transmission: Xtrac 6-speed sequential
- Power: 450–600 hp (340–450 kW)
- Weight: 720–788 kg (1,587–1,737 lb) (LMP675); 900–940 kg (1,980–2,070 lb) (LMP900)

Competition history

The Reynard 01Q was a sports prototype race car, designed, developed and built by British manufacturer Reynard, for sports car racing, conforming to the FIA's LMP675/SR2, and later LMP900 class rules and regulations, in between 2001 and 2003.
