= Élan 6L8 engine =

Élan 6L8 Engine

Overview
- Manufacturer: Élan Motorsport Technologies/Roush-Yates(Ford)
- Production: 1997–2005

Layout
- Configuration: 90° V8
- Displacement: 5,976 cc (365 cu in; 6 L)
- Cylinder bore: 104.2 mm (4 in)
- Piston stroke: 87.6 mm (3 in)
- Valvetrain: 16-valve, OHV, two-valves per cylinder

Combustion
- Fuel system: Zytek electronic multi-point fuel injection
- Oil system: Dry sump

Output
- Power output: ~ 600–640 hp (447–477 kW)
- Torque output: ~ 500–538 lb⋅ft (678–729 N⋅m)

The Élan 6L8 is a four-stroke, naturally-aspirated, OHV, V-8 racing Internal combustion engine, designed, developed and built by American manufacturing company Élan Motorsport Technologies, in partnership and collaboration with Roush-Yates, for sports car racing, between 1997 and 2005. The engine itself is based on the block of the Windsor engine, but the engine itself is also derived, and uses the technology from the Modular engine.

== Applications ==
- Riley & Scott Mk III
- Panoz GTR-1
- Panoz LMP-1 Roadster-S
