= Volkswagen A59 HPT16 engine =

Racing engine

Volkswagen A59 HPT16

Overview
- Manufacturer: Volkswagen Group
- Production: 2000–2011

Layout
- Configuration: Inline-4
- Displacement: 1,998 cc (2.0 L; 121.9 cu in)
- Cylinder bore: 86 mm (3.4 in)
- Piston stroke: 86 mm (3.4 in)
- Cylinder block material: Aluminum alloy
- Cylinder head material: Cast aluminium alloy
- Valvetrain: 4-valve valves per cylinder, hydraulic valve lifters, belt-driven double overhead camshaft (DOHC)
- Compression ratio: 9.5:1

Combustion
- Fuel system: Electronic multi-point fuel injection
- Management: Bosch MS 2.8 engine control unit (ECU)
- Fuel type: Gasoline
- Oil system: Dry sump
- Cooling system: Water-cooled

Output
- Power output: 485 hp (362 kW)
- Torque output: 560 N⋅m (413 lb⋅ft)

The Volkswagen A59 HPT16 is a 2.0 L (120 cu in), four-stroke, turbocharged, four-cylinder racing engine, designed, developed, and built by Volkswagen, for sports car racing, between 2000 and 2011. It is based on the developmental 2.0 L (120 cu in) turbocharged four-cylinder engine used in the Mk3 Golf A59 prototype, which itself is based on the EA827 (EA113) engine.
