= 2001 12 Hours of Sebring =

Sports car endurance race

Track map of the Sebring International Raceway

The 2001 Exxon Superflo 12 Hours of Sebring was the 49th running of this event. It was both the second round of the 2001 American Le Mans Series season and the opening round of the new European Le Mans Series. It took place at Sebring International Raceway, Florida, on March 17, 2001.

French Porsche driver and ambassador Bob Wollek was killed nearby the circuit following a practice session. Wollek had been riding a bicycle along a nearby highway when he was struck by a van. A minute of silence was held prior to the start of the race. Wollek's team, Petersen Motorsports, withdrew from the event out of respect.

This would not only be the final victory of Michele Alboreto's lifetime but also his final race ever as he died one month later.

== Official results ==
Class winners in bold.

Pos	Class	No	Team	Drivers	Chassis	Tyre	Laps
Pos	Class	No	Team	Drivers	Engine	Tyre	Laps
1	**LMP900**	**1**	**(Germany) Audi Sport North America**	**(Italy) Rinaldo Capello (Italy) Michele Alboreto (France) Laurent Aïello**	**Audi R8**	MI	**370**
1	**LMP900**	**1**	**(Germany) Audi Sport North America**	**(Italy) Rinaldo Capello (Italy) Michele Alboreto (France) Laurent Aïello**	**Audi 3.6L Turbo V8**	MI	**370**
2	LMP900	2	(Germany) Audi Sport North America	(Germany) Frank Biela (Italy) Emanuele Pirro (Denmark) Tom Kristensen	Audi R8	MI	370
2	LMP900	2	(Germany) Audi Sport North America	(Germany) Frank Biela (Italy) Emanuele Pirro (Denmark) Tom Kristensen	Audi 3.6L Turbo V8	MI	370
3	LMP900	38	(United States) Champion Racing	(United States) Dorsey Schroeder (United Kingdom) Andy Wallace (Germany) Ralf Kelleners	Audi R8	MI	366
3	LMP900	38	(United States) Champion Racing	(United States) Dorsey Schroeder (United Kingdom) Andy Wallace (Germany) Ralf Kelleners	Audi 3.6L Turbo V8	MI	366
4	LMP900	18	(United Kingdom) Johansson Motorsport (United Kingdom) Arena Motorsport	(Sweden) Stefan Johansson (United Kingdom) Guy Smith	Audi R8	MI	362
4	LMP900	18	(United Kingdom) Johansson Motorsport (United Kingdom) Arena Motorsport	(Sweden) Stefan Johansson (United Kingdom) Guy Smith	Audi 3.6L Turbo V8	MI	362
5	LMP900	37	(United States) Intersport Racing	(United States) Jon Field (United States) Duncan Dayton (United States) Rick Sutherland	Lola B2K/10	G	332
5	LMP900	37	(United States) Intersport Racing	(United States) Jon Field (United States) Duncan Dayton (United States) Rick Sutherland	Judd GV4 4.0L V10	G	332
6	**GTS**	**26**	**(Germany) Konrad Team Saleen**	**(United States) Terry Borcheller (United Kingdom) Oliver Gavin (Austria) Franz Konrad**	**Saleen S7-R**	G	**332**
6	**GTS**	**26**	**(Germany) Konrad Team Saleen**	**(United States) Terry Borcheller (United Kingdom) Oliver Gavin (Austria) Franz Konrad**	**Ford 7.0L V8**	G	**332**
7	GTS	4	(United States) Corvette Racing	(United States) Andy Pilgrim (United States) Kelly Collins (France) Franck Fréon	Chevrolet Corvette C5-R	G	331
7	GTS	4	(United States) Corvette Racing	(United States) Andy Pilgrim (United States) Kelly Collins (France) Franck Fréon	Chevrolet 7.0L V8	G	331
8	**GT**	**23**	**(United States) Alex Job Racing**	**(Germany) Lucas Luhr (Germany) Sascha Maassen (France) Emmanuel Collard**	**Porsche 911 GT3-RS**	MI	**326**
8	**GT**	**23**	**(United States) Alex Job Racing**	**(Germany) Lucas Luhr (Germany) Sascha Maassen (France) Emmanuel Collard**	**Porsche 3.6L Flat-6**	MI	**326**
9	GT	22	(United States) Alex Job Racing	(United States) Randy Pobst (Germany) Christian Menzel (Germany) Timo Bernhard	Porsche 911 GT3-RS	MI	326
9	GT	22	(United States) Alex Job Racing	(United States) Randy Pobst (Germany) Christian Menzel (Germany) Timo Bernhard	Porsche 3.6L Flat-6	MI	326
10	GT	42	(Germany) BMW Motorsport (Germany) Schnitzer Motorsport	(Germany) Jörg Müller (Finland) JJ Lehto	BMW M3 GTR	MI	324
10	GT	42	(Germany) BMW Motorsport (Germany) Schnitzer Motorsport	(Germany) Jörg Müller (Finland) JJ Lehto	BMW 4.0L V8	MI	324
11	GTS	3	(United States) Corvette Racing	(Canada) Ron Fellows (United States) Johnny O'Connell (United States) Chris Kneifel	Chevrolet Corvette C5-R	G	322
11	GTS	3	(United States) Corvette Racing	(Canada) Ron Fellows (United States) Johnny O'Connell (United States) Chris Kneifel	Chevrolet 7.0L V8	G	322
12	GT	6	(United States) Prototype Technology Group	(United States) Boris Said (Germany) Hans-Joachim Stuck (United States) Peter Cunningham	BMW M3	Y	318
12	GT	6	(United States) Prototype Technology Group	(United States) Boris Said (Germany) Hans-Joachim Stuck (United States) Peter Cunningham	BMW 3.2L I6	Y	318
13	GT	00	(France) Larbre Compétition	(France) Christophe Bouchut (France) Patrice Goueslard (France) Sébastien Dumez	Porsche 911 GT3-RS	MI	317
13	GT	00	(France) Larbre Compétition	(France) Christophe Bouchut (France) Patrice Goueslard (France) Sébastien Dumez	Porsche 3.6L Flat-6	MI	317
14	GT	53	(Germany) Seikel Motorsport	(Italy) Alex Caffi (Italy) Fabio Babini (Italy) Gabrio Rosa	Porsche 911 GT3-RS	Y	312
14	GT	53	(Germany) Seikel Motorsport	(Italy) Alex Caffi (Italy) Fabio Babini (Italy) Gabrio Rosa	Porsche 3.6L Flat-6	Y	312
15	GT	69	(Canada) Kyser Racing	(Canada) Jeffrey Pabst (Canada) Kye Wankum (United States) Joe Foster	Porsche 911 GT3-R	D	306
15	GT	69	(Canada) Kyser Racing	(Canada) Jeffrey Pabst (Canada) Kye Wankum (United States) Joe Foster	Porsche 3.6L Flat-6	D	306
16	GT	36	(Germany) Jürgen Alzen Motorsport	(Germany) Jürgen Alzen (Germany) Ulli Richter	Porsche 911 GT3-RS	Y	306
16	GT	36	(Germany) Jürgen Alzen Motorsport	(Germany) Jürgen Alzen (Germany) Ulli Richter	Porsche 3.6L Flat-6	Y	306
17	GT	58	(Germany) Freisinger Motorsport	(Germany) Wolfgang Kaufmann (France) Stéphane Ortelli	Porsche 911 GT3-RS	Y	300
17	GT	58	(Germany) Freisinger Motorsport	(Germany) Wolfgang Kaufmann (France) Stéphane Ortelli	Porsche 3.6L Flat-6	Y	300
18	GTS	45	(United States) American Viperacing	(United States) Erik Messley (United States) Jeff Altenburg (United States) Stu Hayner	Dodge Viper GTS-R	D	298
18	GTS	45	(United States) American Viperacing	(United States) Erik Messley (United States) Jeff Altenburg (United States) Stu Hayner	Dodge 8.0L V10	D	298
19	GT	09	(United States) Cirtek Motorsport	(United States) Keith Alexander (United States) Chris Gleason (United Kingdom) Gavin Pickering	Porsche 911 GT3-RS	D	293
19	GT	09	(United States) Cirtek Motorsport	(United States) Keith Alexander (United States) Chris Gleason (United Kingdom) Gavin Pickering	Porsche 3.6L Flat-6	D	293
20 DNF	GT	59	(Germany) Freisinger Motorsport	(Germany) Klaus Horn (United Kingdom) Nigel Smith	Porsche 911 GT3-RS	Y	276
20 DNF	GT	59	(Germany) Freisinger Motorsport	(Germany) Klaus Horn (United Kingdom) Nigel Smith	Porsche 3.6L Flat-6	Y	276
21 DNF	GT	66	(United States) The Racer's Group	(United States) Kevin Buckler (United States) Tom McGlynn (United States) Stephen Earle	Porsche 911 GT3-RS	Y	271
21 DNF	GT	66	(United States) The Racer's Group	(United States) Kevin Buckler (United States) Tom McGlynn (United States) Stephen Earle	Porsche 3.6L Flat-6	Y	271
22	GTS	44	(United States) American Viperacing	(United States) Tom Weickardt (United States) Joe Ellis (United Kingdom) Andy Pardoe	Dodge Viper GTS-R	D	235
22	GTS	44	(United States) American Viperacing	(United States) Tom Weickardt (United States) Joe Ellis (United Kingdom) Andy Pardoe	Dodge 8.0L V10	D	235
23 DNF	LMP900	16	(United States) Dyson Racing Team	(United States) Butch Leitzinger (United States) Elliott Forbes-Robinson (United Kingdom) James Weaver	Riley & Scott Mk III C	G	205
23 DNF	LMP900	16	(United States) Dyson Racing Team	(United States) Butch Leitzinger (United States) Elliott Forbes-Robinson (United Kingdom) James Weaver	Lincoln (Élan) 6.0L V8	G	205
24 DNF	GT	43	(Germany) BMW Motorsport (Germany) Schnitzer Motorsport	(Germany) Dirk Müller (Sweden) Fredrik Ekblom	BMW M3	MI	168
24 DNF	GT	43	(Germany) BMW Motorsport (Germany) Schnitzer Motorsport	(Germany) Dirk Müller (Sweden) Fredrik Ekblom	BMW 3.2L I6	MI	168
25 DNF	LMP900	72	(France) Pescarolo Sport	(France) Jean-Christophe Boullion (France) Sébastien Bourdais (France) Laurent Redon	Courage C60	MI	167
25 DNF	LMP900	72	(France) Pescarolo Sport	(France) Jean-Christophe Boullion (France) Sébastien Bourdais (France) Laurent Redon	Peugeot A32 3.2L Turbo V6	MI	167
26 DNF	GT	07	(Germany) RWS Motorsport	(Germany) Norman Simon (Austria) Dieter Quester (Austria) Philipp Peter	Porsche 911 GT3-R	D	127
26 DNF	GT	07	(Germany) RWS Motorsport	(Germany) Norman Simon (Austria) Dieter Quester (Austria) Philipp Peter	Porsche 3.6L Flat-6	D	127
27 DNF	GT	15	(United States) Dick Barbour Racing	(United States) Mark Neuhaus (United States) Grady Willingham (Mexico) Randy Wars	Porsche 911 GT3-R	D	121
27 DNF	GT	15	(United States) Dick Barbour Racing	(United States) Mark Neuhaus (United States) Grady Willingham (Mexico) Randy Wars	Porsche 3.6L Flat-6	D	121
28 DNF	LMP900	50	(United States) Panoz Motor Sports	(Denmark) Jan Magnussen (Australia) David Brabham	Panoz LMP07	MI	109
28 DNF	LMP900	50	(United States) Panoz Motor Sports	(Denmark) Jan Magnussen (Australia) David Brabham	Élan (Zytek) 4.0L V8	MI	109
29 DNF	GT	17	(United States) Trinkler Racing	(United States) Owen Trinkler (United States) Andy Lally (United States) B.J. Zacharias	Chevrolet Corvette C5 LM-GT	G	108
29 DNF	GT	17	(United States) Trinkler Racing	(United States) Owen Trinkler (United States) Andy Lally (United States) B.J. Zacharias	Chevrolet 5.7L V8	G	108
30 DNF	LMP675	11	(United States) Roock-KnightHawk Racing	(United States) Steven Knight (United States) Mel Hawkins (Germany) Claudia Hürtgen	Lola B2K/40	A	105
30 DNF	LMP675	11	(United States) Roock-KnightHawk Racing	(United States) Steven Knight (United States) Mel Hawkins (Germany) Claudia Hürtgen	Nissan (AER) VQL 3.4L V6	A	105
31 DNF	GT	98	(United States) Kelly-Moss Motorsports	(United States) Cort Wagner (United States) Rick Polk (United States) Darren Law	Porsche 911 GT3-R	Y	68
31 DNF	GT	98	(United States) Kelly-Moss Motorsports	(United States) Cort Wagner (United States) Rick Polk (United States) Darren Law	Porsche 3.6L Flat-6	Y	68
32 DNF	GT	52	(Germany) Seikel Motorsport	(Canada) Brian Burgess (United States) Philip Collin (New Zealand) Andrew Bagnall	Porsche 911 GT3-RS	Y	60
32 DNF	GT	52	(Germany) Seikel Motorsport	(Canada) Brian Burgess (United States) Philip Collin (New Zealand) Andrew Bagnall	Porsche 3.6L Flat-6	Y	60
33 DNF	GT	10	(United States) Prototype Technology Group	(United States) Bill Auberlen (United States) Joey Hand (Sweden) Niclas Jönsson	BMW M3	Y	57
33 DNF	GT	10	(United States) Prototype Technology Group	(United States) Bill Auberlen (United States) Joey Hand (Sweden) Niclas Jönsson	BMW 3.2L I6	Y	57
34 DNF	GT	12	(United States) Aspen Knolls MCR	(United States) Shane Lewis (United States) Vic Rice (United States) Bob Mazzuoccola	Callaway C12-R	G	50
34 DNF	GT	12	(United States) Aspen Knolls MCR	(United States) Shane Lewis (United States) Vic Rice (United States) Bob Mazzuoccola	Chevrolet 7.0L V8	G	50
35 DNF	GT	99	(United States) Kelly-Moss Motorsports	(United States) Anthony Lazzaro (United States) David Murry	Porsche 911 GT3-RS	Y	47
35 DNF	GT	99	(United States) Kelly-Moss Motorsports	(United States) Anthony Lazzaro (United States) David Murry	Porsche 3.6L Flat-6	Y	47
36 DNF	LMP900	51	(United States) Panoz Motor Sports	(Germany) Klaus Graf (Brazil) Gualter Salles	Panoz LMP07	MI	28
36 DNF	LMP900	51	(United States) Panoz Motor Sports	(Germany) Klaus Graf (Brazil) Gualter Salles	Élan (Zytek) 4.0L V8	MI	28
DSQ^{†}	GT	34	(United States) Orbit	(United States) Leo Hindery (United States) Peter Baron (United States) Gian Luigi Buitoni	Porsche 911 GT3-RS	D	84
DSQ^{†}	GT	34	(United States) Orbit	(United States) Leo Hindery (United States) Peter Baron (United States) Gian Luigi Buitoni	Porsche 3.6L Flat-6	D	84
DSQ^{†}	GT	47	(United States) Broadfoot Racing	(United States) John Warner (United States) Allan Ziegelman (Spain) Paco Orti	Porsche 911 GT3-R	D	64
DSQ^{†}	GT	47	(United States) Broadfoot Racing	(United States) John Warner (United States) Allan Ziegelman (Spain) Paco Orti	Porsche 3.6L Flat-6	D	64
WD^{††}	GT	30	(United States) Petersen Motorsports	(United Kingdom) Johnny Mowlem (France) Bob Wollek (United States) Michael Peterseon	Porsche 911 GT3-R	MI	-
WD^{††}	GT	30	(United States) Petersen Motorsports	(United Kingdom) Johnny Mowlem (France) Bob Wollek (United States) Michael Peterseon	Porsche 3.6L Flat-6	MI	-
DNS	GT	35	(United States) Orbit	(United States) Tony Kester (United States) Richard Millman (Republic of Ireland) Tommy Byrne	Porsche 911 GT3-RS	D	-
DNS	GT	35	(United States) Orbit	(United States) Tony Kester (United States) Richard Millman (Republic of Ireland) Tommy Byrne	Porsche 3.6L Flat-6	D	-

† - #47 Broadfoot Racing was disqualified during the race for making an illegal repair to their car. #34 Orbit was disqualified during the race for receiving outside assistance while still on the track.

†† - #30 Peterson Motorsports withdrew their entry from the race following Bob Wollek's fatal bicycle accident after a practice session.

== Statistics ==
- Pole Position - #2 Audi Sport North America - 1:49.477
- Fastest Lap - #2 Audi Sport North America - 1:49.666
- Distance - 2203.192 km
- Average Speed - 183.438 km/h

American Le Mans Series
Previous race: 2001 Grand Prix of Texas	2001 season	Next race: 2001 ELMS at Donington Park

European Le Mans Series
Previous race: None	2001 season	Next race: 2001 ELMS at Donington Park
