= Sébastien Bourdais =

French racing driver (born 1979)

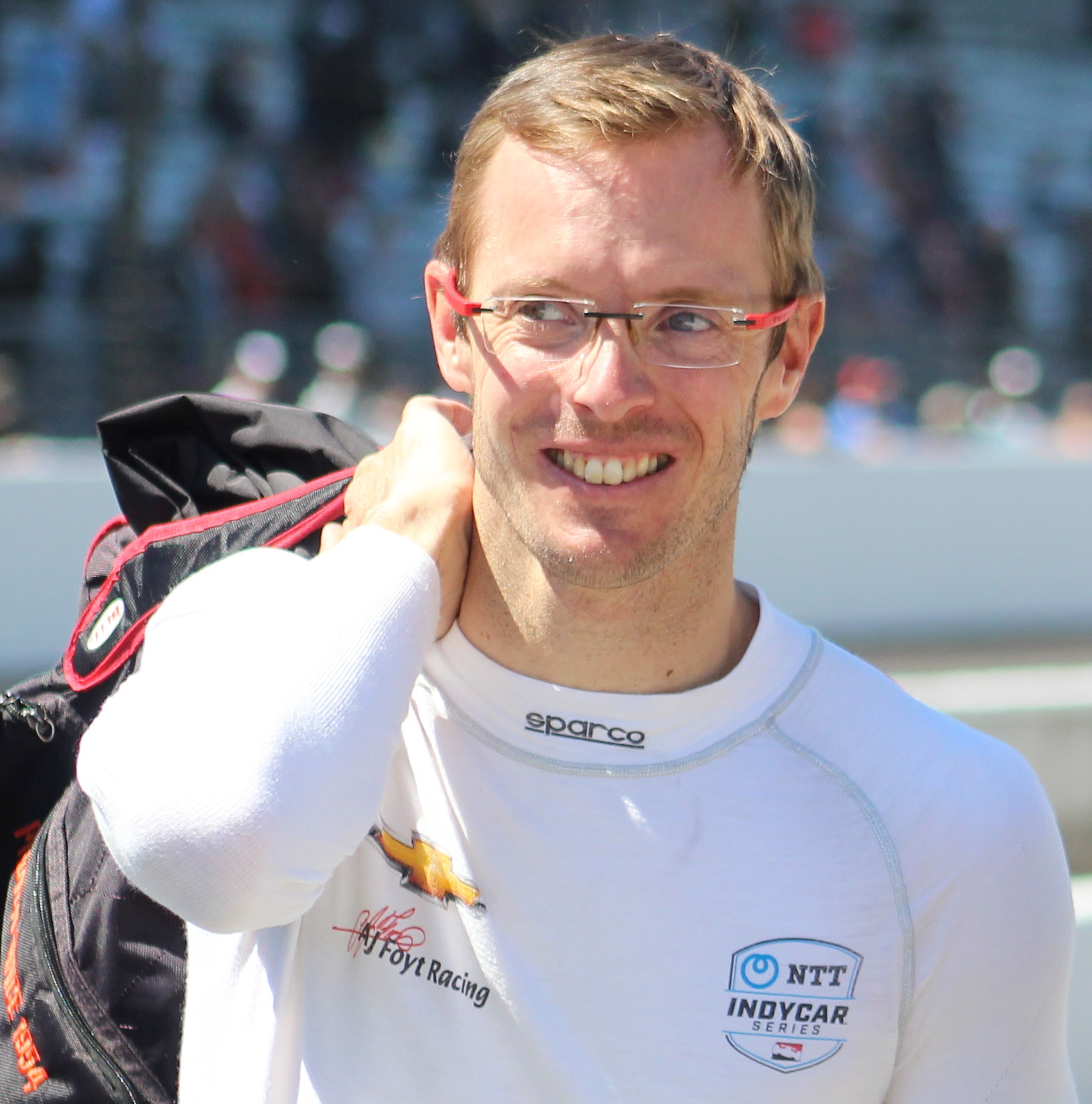
- Bourdais at the 2021 Indianapolis 500.
- Nationality: (France) French
- Born: Sébastien Olivier Bourdais; 28 February 1979 (age 47) Le Mans, France
- Relatives: Patrick Bourdais (father)
- Categorisation: FIA Platinum
- Achievements: 2004, 2005, 2006, 2007 Champ Car World Series Champion; 2002 International Formula 3000 Champion; 1999 French Formula Three Champion; 2014 Rolex 24 at Daytona overall winner 2017 Rolex 24 at Daytona GTLM Class winner 2016 24 Hours of Le Mans LMGTE Pro Class winner 2015, 2021 12 Hours of Sebring winner 2025 Rolex 24 at Daytona LMP2 Class winner
- Awards: 2003 Champ Car World Series Rookie of the Year

IndyCar Series career
- 151 races run over 12 years
- Best finish: 7th (2018)
- First race: 2005 Indianapolis 500 (Indianapolis)
- Last race: 2021 Acura Grand Prix of Long Beach (Long Beach)
- First win: 2014 Honda Indy Toronto (Exhibition Place)
- Last win: 2018 Firestone Grand Prix of St. Petersburg (St. Petersburg)
Wins	Podiums	Poles
6	13	3

Champ Car career
- 73 races run over 5 years
- Years active: 2003–2007
- Best finish: 1st (2004, 2005, 2006, 2007)
- First race: 2003 Grand Prix of St. Petersburg (St. Petersburg)
- Last race: 2007 Gran Premio de Mexico (Autódromo Hermanos Rodríguez)
- First win: 2003 London Champ Car Trophy (Brands Hatch)
- Last win: 2007 Gran Premio de Mexico (Autódromo Hermanos Rodríguez)
Wins	Podiums	Poles
31	44	31
Sébastien Bourdais
Formula One World Championship career
- Active years: 2008–2009
- Team: Scuderia Toro Rosso
- Entries: 27
- Championships: 0
- Wins: 0
- Podiums: 0
- Career points: 6
- Pole positions: 0
- Fastest laps: 0
- First entry: 2008 Australian Grand Prix
- Last entry: 2009 German Grand Prix
24 Hours of Le Mans career
- Years: 1999–2002, 2004, 2007, 2009–2012, 2016, 2018–2020, 2022–2024
- Teams: Larbre, Pescarolo, Peugeot, Ford-Ganassi, Risi, Vector, Cadillac-Ganassi
- Best finish: 2nd (2007, 2009, 2011)
- Class wins: 1 (2016)

Sébastien Olivier Bourdais (French pronunciation: [sebastjɛ̃ ɔlivje buʁdɛ]; born 28 February 1979) is a French professional racing driver who currently races in the FIA World Endurance Championship for Cadillac Hertz Team Jota in the Hypercar category. He is one of the most successful drivers in the history of American open-wheel car racing, having won 37 races. He won four successive championships in the Champ Car World Series from 2004 to 2007. Later he competed at the IndyCar Series from 2011 to 2021. He also entered 27 races in Formula One for the Toro Rosso team during 2008 and the start of 2009.

Bourdais has raced sports cars throughout his career, with spells at the Rolex Sports Car Series, American Le Mans Series, Le Mans Series, Intercontinental Le Mans Cup, FIA World Endurance Championship. He was a Peugeot Sport factory driver from 2007 to 2011, finishing runner-up three times at his home race, the 24 Hours of Le Mans. The Frenchman was a Ford Performance factory driver from 2016 to 2019, winning the GTE-Pro class at the 2016 24 Hours of Le Mans. He became a Cadillac factory driver in 2022. As of January 2025, he has won 76 races in total.

== Early years ==
=== Karting ===
Born into a racing family in Le Mans (his father Patrick raced in touring cars, hill climbs and sports cars), Bourdais began his racing career at the age of ten in karts. During the early 1990s, he competed in a variety of karting championships, winning the Maine Bretagne League in 1991 and the Cadet France championship in 1993. Bourdais was part of the winning Sologne Karting team which won the 1996 24-hour Le Mans kart race at the Circuit Alain Prost on a Merlin chassis with Atomic motors.

=== Junior formulae ===
Bourdais progressed to single-seater racing in 1995, finishing ninth in the Formula Campus by Renault and Elf Championship. He then spent two years in the French Formula Renault Championship, ultimately finishing second in points in 1997 after winning four races and five pole positions. In 1998, he won five races to become Rookie of the Year (sixth overall) in French F3. He won the series outright in 1999, with eight wins and three poles.

=== Formula 3000 ===
Following his success in the lower formulae, Bourdais joined the Prost Junior Team in the International F3000 Championship. He finished ninth in the series with one pole and a best finish of second. In 2001, Bourdais moved to the DAMS team in Formula 3000 and took his first win in the series at Silverstone. He changed teams again for 2002, taking his Super Nova Racing car to three victories and seven pole positions. He beat Giorgio Pantano to the championship by two points after Tomáš Enge, who had scored the most points, was penalised for failing a drug test.

=== DTM ===
After his Formula 3000 career and with no prospects for graduation to Formula 1, Bourdais signed with Opel to race in the DTM in 2003. His manager, David Sears, inserted a clause in his contract which allowed him to break his contract without penalties (conditional mutual rescission) in the event that he managed to secure a drive in Formula 1, CART or the Indy Racing League. Bourdais tested for Opel but did not drive in a DTM race because he managed to secure a drive in CART for 2003. Bourdais was to be paid €250,000 for his 2003 season with Opel.

== CART/Champ Car career ==
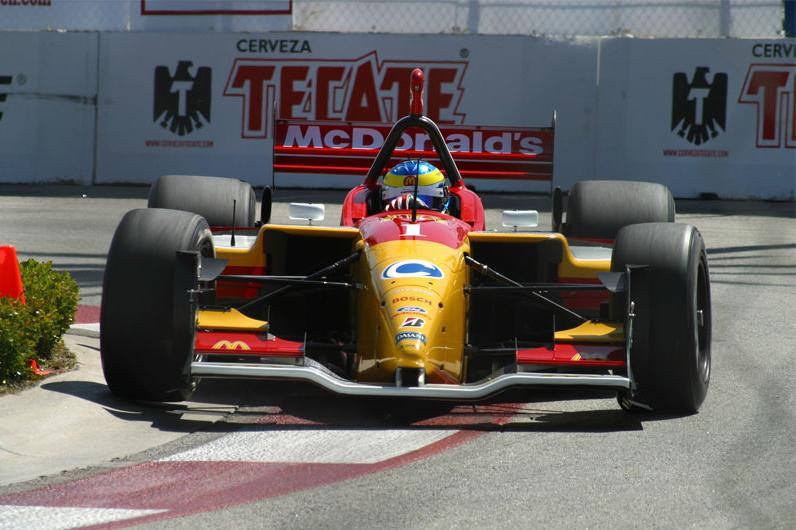
Bourdais won his second Champ Car title in 2005.

Following in the footsteps of recent F3000 graduates such as Juan Pablo Montoya and Bruno Junqueira, Bourdais moved to Champ Car racing in the United States and joined Newman/Haas Racing for the 2003 CART season. At St. Petersburg, Florida, Bourdais became the first rookie since Nigel Mansell to claim pole position for his very first race. However, he did not finish higher than eleventh until his fourth race, when he led 95 laps en route to his first Champ Car victory at Brands Hatch.

Bourdais followed this up with another victory at the Lausitzring. By the end of the season, he had earned five more podium finishes, including a win from the pole at Cleveland. With a runner-up finish in Mexico City, he clinched the Rookie of the Year title and finished fourth in the overall standings.

Bourdais was paid US $70,000 to drive for Newman/Haas Racing in 2003.

Staying with Newman-Haas for 2004, Bourdais dominated the Champ Car series with seven wins and eight poles in his McDonald's-sponsored Lola, beating his teammate Junqueira by 28 points. His record also included podium finishes in ten out of fourteen events and qualifying results no lower than third all season.

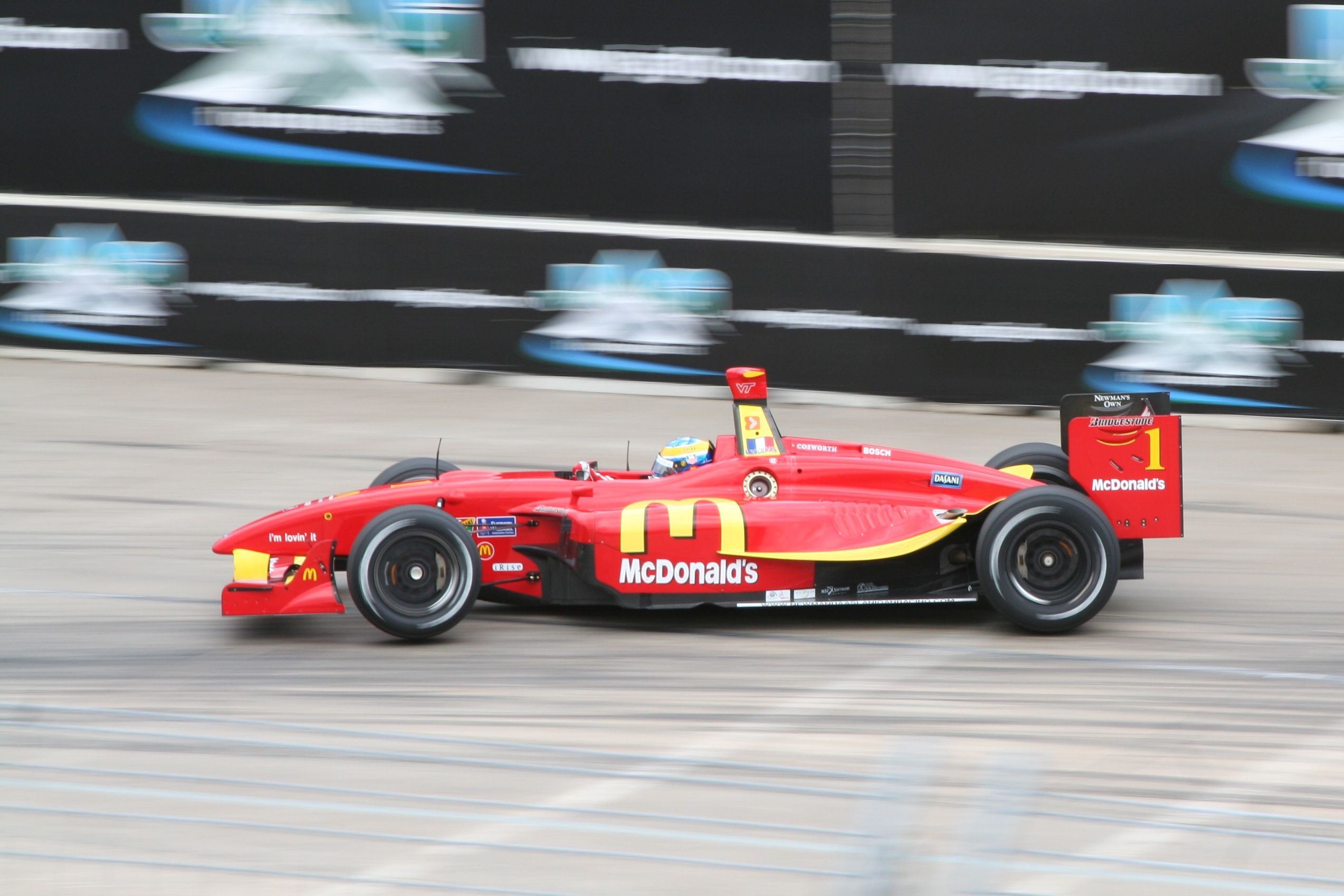
Bourdais winning the 2007 Grand Prix of Houston.

Bourdais successfully defended his Champ Car title in 2005 with five wins in six races towards the end of the season, again with the Newman-Haas/Lanigan team. That May, he also finished twelfth in his first Indianapolis 500.

Bourdais won a third consecutive Champ Car title in 2006. His season began with four consecutive victories at Long Beach, Houston, Monterrey, and Milwaukee, although his winning streak was ended by the emergence of A. J. Allmendinger, who won three races in a row through the middle of the season. Bourdais responded with a commanding victory from pole at San Jose, leaving him leading the Champ Car points standings.

However, an incident with his arch-rival Paul Tracy that knocked Bourdais out on the final lap of the following race in Denver, and a subsequent win by Allmendinger narrowed the gap between the two. Bourdais's win in Montreal and Allmendinger's DNF had widened his points lead to 62 points with three races left, and Bourdais clinched the championship at the next race in Surfers Paradise despite a weak performance in that race. Bourdais became the first Champ Car driver to win three consecutive titles since Ted Horn achieved the hat trick in 1948.

Bourdais won a fourth consecutive Champ Car title in 2007 with victory at Lexmark Indy 300 on 21 October.

== Formula One career ==
=== Pre-champ car ===
In 2002, Bourdais got his first F1 test with the Arrows team and was signed on to drive for the team but the team was on the verge of bankruptcy. In December he tested for Renault at Jerez but fellow Frenchman Franck Montagny secured the test drive instead of Bourdais.

=== Toro Rosso ===
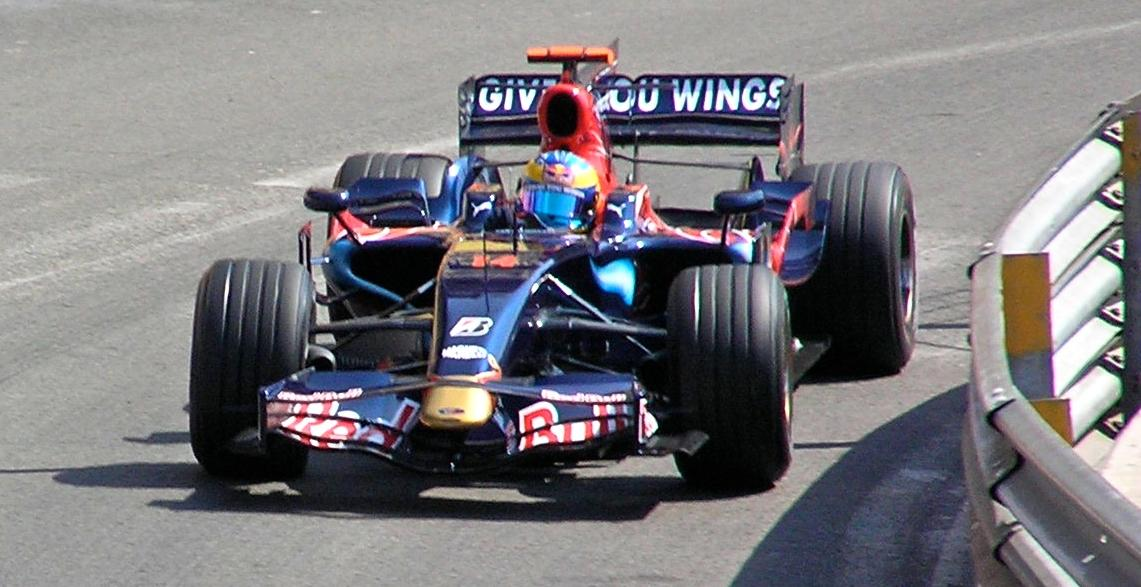
Bourdais driving for Toro Rosso at the 2008 Monaco Grand Prix.

Bourdais returned to F1 in 2007 after being given several tests with Scuderia Toro Rosso. On 10 August 2007 it was announced Bourdais would replace Vitantonio Liuzzi at Red Bull's b-team, Toro Rosso, as team-mate to Sebastian Vettel. On 16 March 2008, Bourdais competed in his first Formula One Championship race, the 2008 Australian Grand Prix in Melbourne. After qualifying in seventeenth position, he took advantage of mistakes made by other drivers, in the first Formula One race since the 2001 San Marino Grand Prix without traction control, and worked his way up to fourth. However, with three laps remaining an engine problem forced Bourdais to retire, but he was still classified eighth having completed more than 90% of the race distance. He later inherited seventh place (and two Championship points) after the disqualification of Rubens Barrichello.

Bourdais qualified ninth for the Belgian Grand Prix. During the race he quickly gained places and held on to fifth place for much of the distance, getting as high as third and was on course for a podium position. As the rain fell harder on the last lap he was overtaken by several cars on wet tyres and finished seventh. After the race, an emotional Bourdais was close to tears following the result. This marked his best weekend of the season and his first World Championship points since Melbourne.

Bourdais qualified in fourth place for the 2008 Italian Grand Prix. However, his car would not select first gear on the grid and had to start from the pit lane, a lap down (as the race started behind the safety car, there was no warm-up lap). Although he eventually finished a lap behind the race winner, team-mate Vettel, he set the second-fastest lap of the race; only Ferrari's Kimi Räikkönen went faster. At the 2008 Japanese Grand Prix, he was sixth on the road but received a 25-second penalty for causing an avoidable accident with Felipe Massa dropping him to tenth. Few agreed with the decision – ITV Sport's Martin Brundle had stated during live TV coverage of the race that he felt Massa might receive a penalty, whilst his colleague James Allen stated that 99% of experts he spoke to felt that Bourdais did not deserve a penalty; the FIA were under such public scrutiny at the time following a string of controversial decisions that they made the unprecedented step of releasing publicly "stewards only" footage of the incident, to justify the decision.

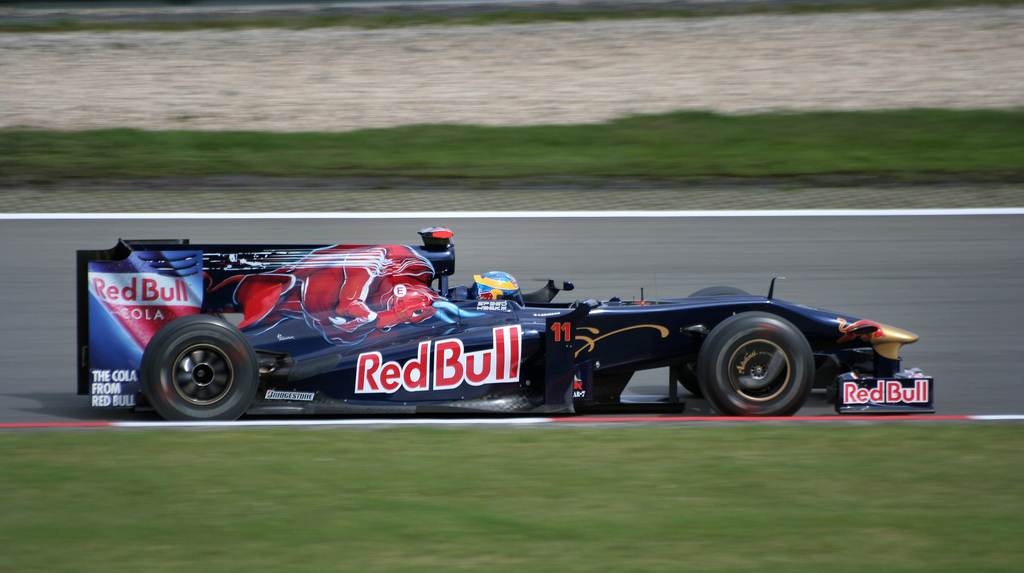
Bourdais driving for Toro Rosso at the 2009 German Grand Prix.

Bourdais tested significantly for the Toro Rosso team during the winter, though he was uncertain of a drive heading into the new year. On 6 February 2009 however, he was confirmed as a Toro Rosso driver for a second year, partnering Swiss rookie Sébastien Buemi. Despite two points finishes in the year at the Australian Grand Prix and in Monaco, Bourdais struggled to match his less experienced team-mate. In Spain Bourdais struck Buemi's car as the field attempted to avoid a spun Jarno Trulli on the first lap, ending the race for both drivers. At the British Grand Prix, Bourdais collided with McLaren driver Heikki Kovalainen, again ending the race for both. At the German Grand Prix, he suffered a mechanical failure after qualifying last by over a second.

On 16 July 2009, Toro Rosso announced that Bourdais would no longer be driving for the team. Toro Rosso's Franz Tost said the partnership had not met up to his expectations, and Bourdais would be replaced as of the Hungarian Grand Prix. Bourdais was advised by counsel to file suit for breach of contract by Toro Rosso, as he had a viable case. Toro Rosso settled the matter with a $2.1 million payment to Bourdais to avoid litigation.

== 24 Hours of Le Mans ==
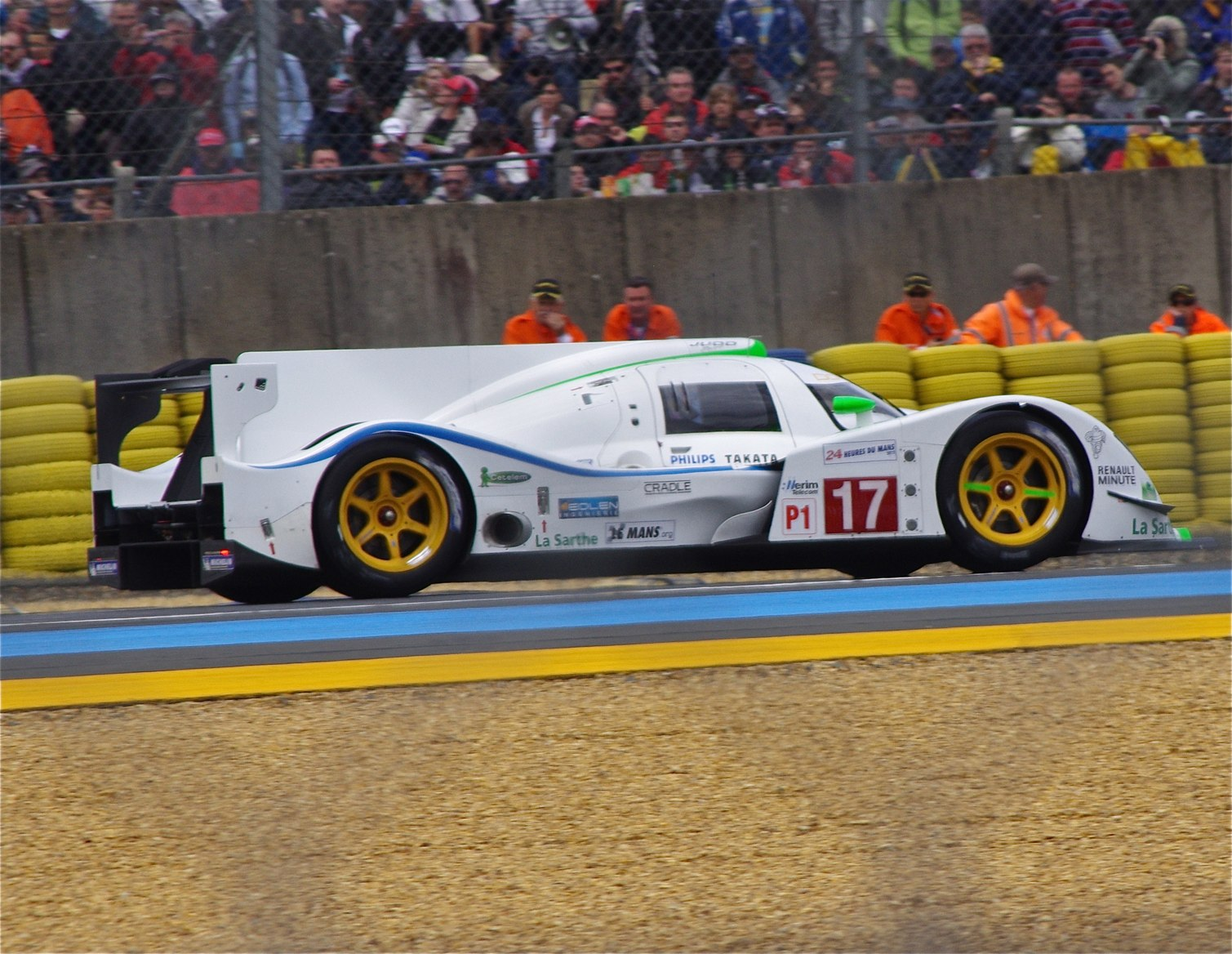
The Dome S102.5 that Bourdais drove at the 2012 24 Hours of Le Mans.

Bourdais has frequently contested the famous 24-hour race of his hometown, entering for the first time in 1999 (aged only twenty) in a Porsche 911 GT2 run by Larbre Compétition. The car, which he shared with Pierre de Thoisy and Jean-Pierre Jarier, retired after 134 laps with engine failure.

Bourdais returned in 2000, finishing fourth with Emmanuel Clérico and Olivier Grouillard for the Pescarolo team behind the three dominant Audis.

Bourdais' next three appearances did not go so well. He shared a Courage C60 with Jean-Christophe Boullion and Laurent Rédon in 2001 but it retired after 271 laps. He drove the same model the next year and finished ninth in the LMP900 class with Bouillon and Franck Lagorce. He missed the 2003 race and returned in 2004, only for the car he shared with Nicolas Minassian and Emmanuel Collard to retire after 282 laps.

Bourdais' next assault on Le Mans would come at the wheel of a factory-backed Peugeot 908 HDi FAP in 2007. The car he shared with Stéphane Sarrazin and Pedro Lamy finished the race second behind the winning Audi R10 TDi, despite an embarrassing slide on the first lap in wet conditions that cost Bourdais a place to one of the Audis, and car problems forcing him to park the car for the last minutes of the race, waiting for the lead R10 to cross the line. In his second Le Mans as part of the Peugeot factory team, in 2009, he finished in second place, one lap behind the winning Peugeot. Bourdais was to drive the pole-winning No. 3 Peugeot in 2010, but a suspension failure halted co-driver Pedro Lamy before Bourdais could turn one lap in the race.

== Superleague Formula ==
After leaving Formula One, Bourdais signed up to drive the Sevilla FC car in the Superleague Formula series. He won on his debut weekend at the 2009 Estoril round in the Super Final. Bourdais won again at the next round, winning race 1 of the 2009 Monza round. He returned for the 2010 season racing for Olympique Lyonnais.

== Sports and touring car racing career ==
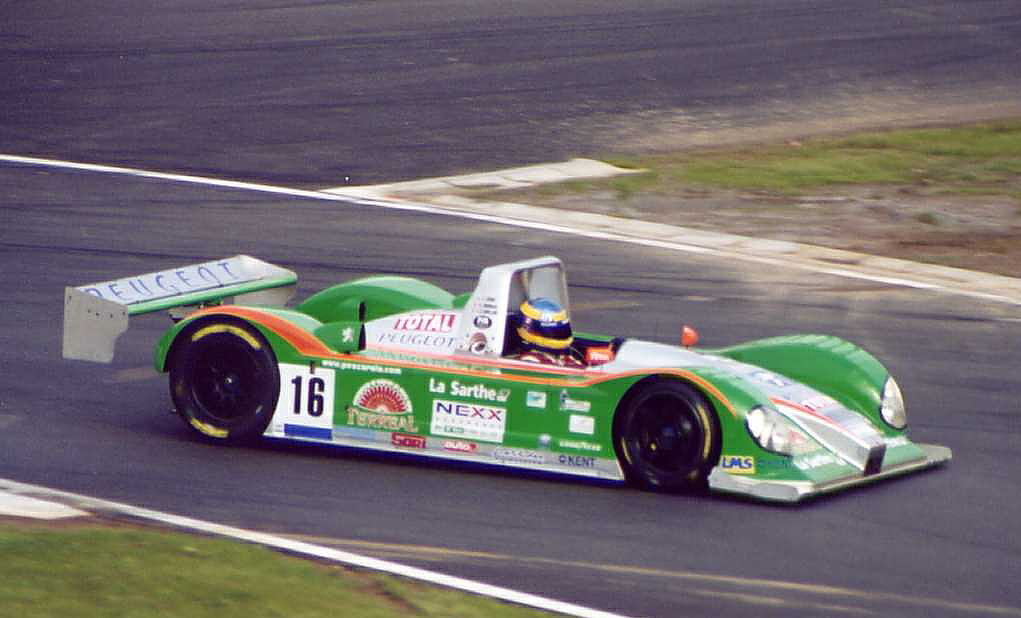
Bourdais driving at Monza during the 2001 FIA Sportscar Championship.

While racing in the junior formulae and Champ Cars, Bourdais made several appearances in other championships. He won the Spa 24 Hours in 2002 with Christophe Bouchut, David Terrien and Vincent Vosse in a Larbre Compétition Chrysler Viper GTS-R. He also won his class at the 2006 12 Hours of Sebring in a Panoz Esperante. In 2005 he also competed in the International Race of Champions, winning his first stock car race at Texas Motor Speedway. In 2009, he set the official lap record at Sebring International Raceway, during the 12 Hours of Sebring. In 2010, Bourdais raced with Scott Tucker, Christophe Bouchut, Emmanuel Collard and Sascha Maassen for Crown Royal in a Level 5 Motorsports prepared Daytona Prototype in the prestigious Rolex 24 at Daytona, held at Daytona International Speedway in Florida. Bourdais recorded incredibly fast laps before the car retired due to an engine failure with Collard at the wheel.

In October 2010, Bourdais drove with Jonathon Webb in the Mother Racing Ford Falcon V8 Supercar in the Gold Coast 600. In October 2011, Bourdais drove with Jamie Whincup in the Team Vodafone Holden Commodore V8 Supercar in the Gold Coast 600, winning Saturday's opening race and finishing second in the second race landed Bourdais the inaugural Dan Wheldon Memorial Trophy, awarded to the international driver who scored the most points over the Gold Coast weekend. Wheldon had been set to contest the event but lost his life in the 2011 IndyCar season finale just a week earlier. Winning the V8 Supercar race meant that he is the only driver to have won a race at the Surfers Paradise Street Circuit in both Champcar/Indycar, as well as V8 Supercar. He has also participated in the Bathurst 1000 once, finishing ninth with Lee Holdsworth in 2015.

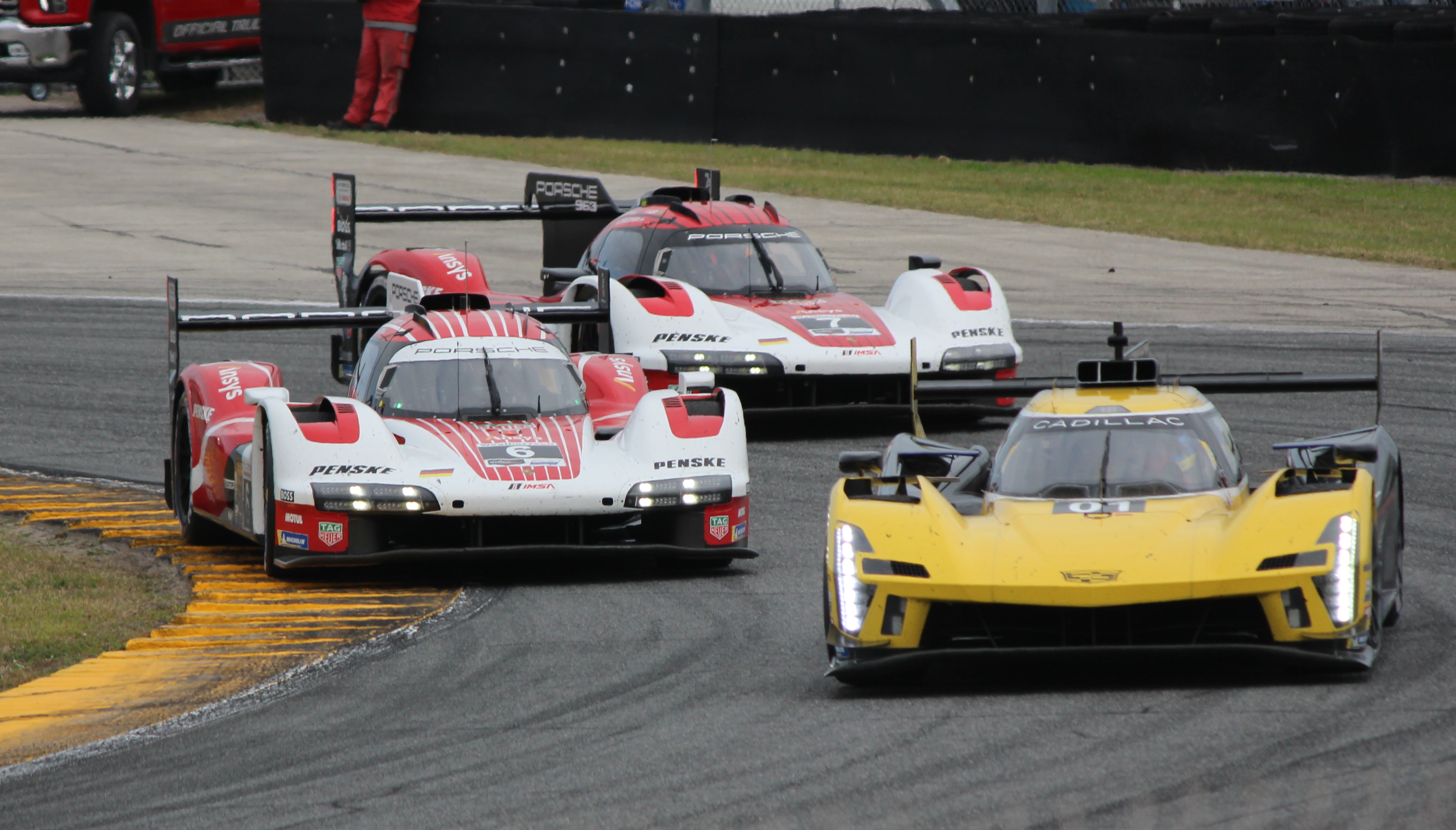
Bourdais leading both Penske Porsche cars during the 2023 24 Hours of Daytona.

In July 2012, Bourdais won the inaugural Brickyard Grand Prix Rolex Sports Car Series race at Indianapolis Motor Speedway, teaming with Alex Popow in the No. 2 Starworks Motorsport Riley-Ford Daytona Prototype. In October, Bourdais teamed up again with Jamie Whincup in the Team Vodafone Holden Commodore V8 Supercar for the Gold Coast 600, again taking the victory on Saturday and scoring enough points on Sunday to win the event. This also awarded him the Dan Wheldon Memorial Trophy for the second time.

Bourdais won the Rolex 24 at Daytona in 2014 in the Action Express Corvette DP with João Barbosa and Christian Fittipaldi. In 2015 he finished second at the 24 Hours of Daytona and claimed the win at the 12 Hours of Sebring, both with an Action Express Corvette DP.

On 22 November 2019, the day it was announced he had lost his IndyCar series ride, Bourdais was announced as one of the drivers for the No. 5 Mustang Sampling Racing/JDC-Miller Motorsports entry, alongside Joao Barbosa.

Since 2022, Bourdais has primarily focused on his Cadillac duties, driving for Chip Ganassi Racing in IMSA until 2024 when he signed to drive for Cadillac Hertz Team Jota.

== IndyCar career ==
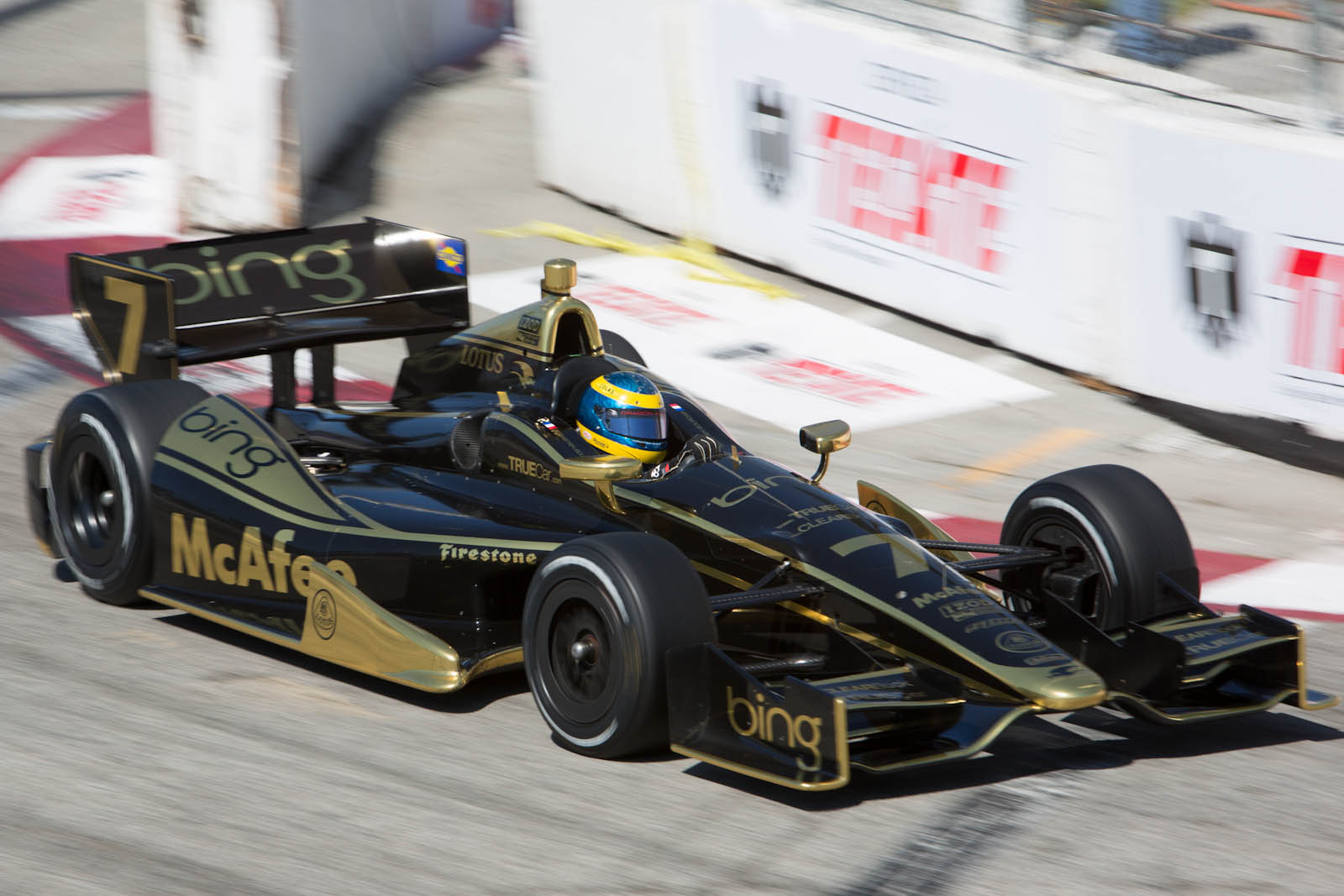
Bourdais driving at the 2012 Toyota Grand Prix of Long Beach.

Bourdais made his IRL debut at the 2005 Indianapolis 500. In his first full-time season in the unified Indycar series (2011) with Dale Coyne, Bourdais wound up 23rd in the championship, scoring the fastest race lap at Edmonton.

A switch to Dragon Racing Team for 2012–13, first with the ill-fated Lotus, then with improved Chevrolet power, he finished 25th and twelfth, respectively, in the IndyCar championship. By 2014, Bourdais broke through for two pole positions and one victory. By midpoint in the 2015 season, his second year driving for Jimmy Vasser's KV Racing team alongside teammate Stefano Coletti, Bourdais's stock steadily rose, to top-20 status in the world drivers' ranking.

On 20 July 2014, having won the first heat race in Toronto, Sébastien Bourdais joined Al Unser Jr. and Ryan Hunter-Reay as the third driver in the history of organised motorsport to score open-wheel Championship Racing victories, under three sanctioning bodies (e.g., CART, and CCWS, and IRL sanction), in North America. Against stiff opposition, Bourdais finished 2014 scoring five top-fives and tenth overall in the 2014 IRL championship.

On 31 May 2015, in the second heat race at Belle Isle, Detroit, in a drive from far back on the grid harkening back to Stefan Bellof at Monaco in 1984, effortlessly carving his way by lesser drivers on a tight, composite street circuit, in heavy rain, breaking through with an impressive, high-profile victory and fastest race lap, Bourdais recorded his 33rd victory in American Championship car racing, just behind Al Unser Jr. with 34.

On 12 July 2015, at the Milwaukee Mile, Bourdais dominated the field and had the entire field a lap down at one point and won, his second of the 2015 season. He finished tenth in points. After KV Racing went down to one team for 2016, Bourdais struggled with a lone win again at Detroit. He finished in fourteenth in points for 2016. In October 2016, it was announced that Bourdais would make the change to Dale Coyne Racing to drive the No. 18 for the 2017 season. His KVSH race engineer Olivier Boisson would also follow him to DCR.

In his first race back to DCR, Bourdais won the Firestone Grand Prix of St. Petersburg to start the 2017 season coming from last after a qualifying crash, on 12 March 2017. He backed this up with another recovery drive at the Long Beach race, starting from ninth and making an early rear wing change, to finish second, extending his lead in the series standings.

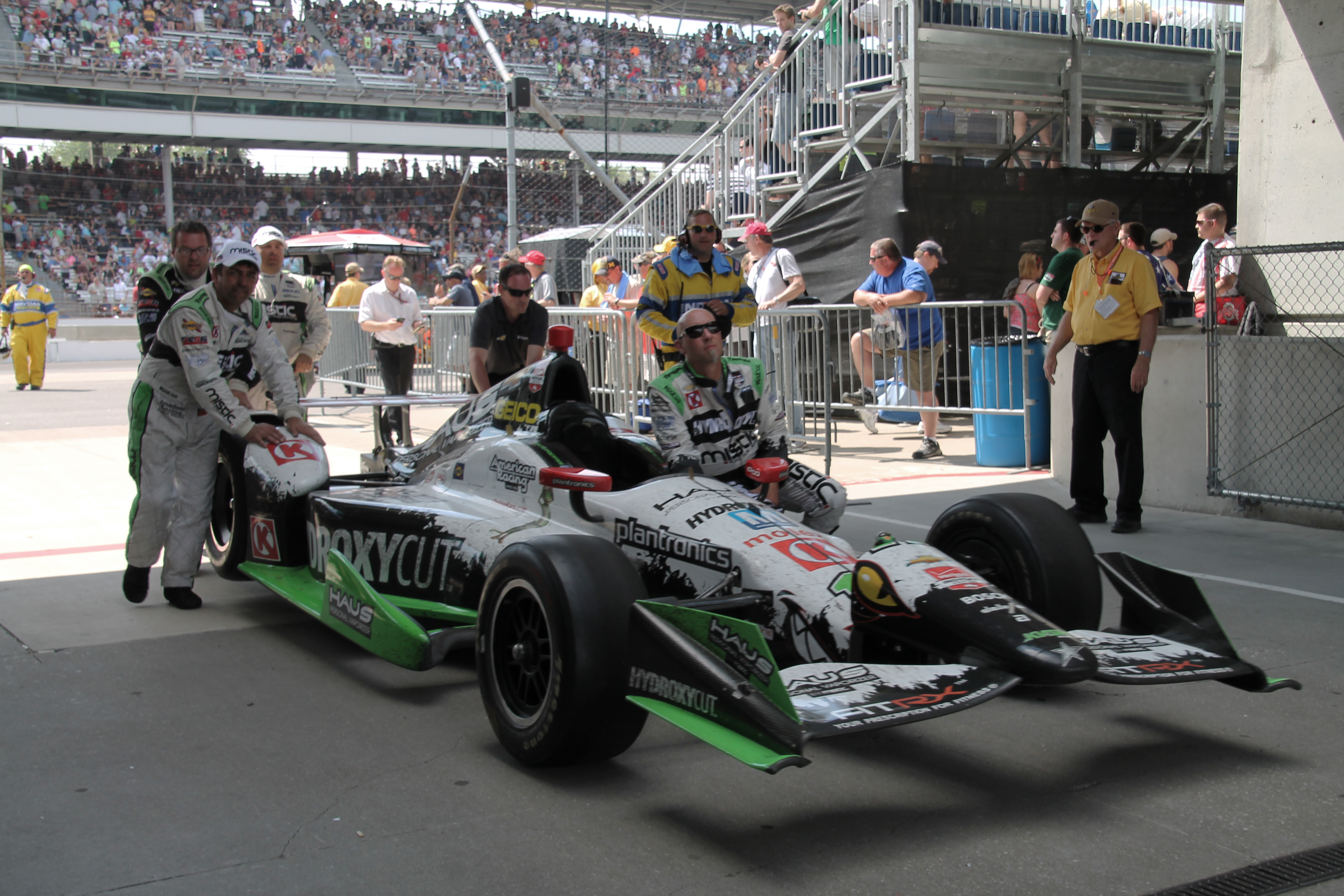
Bourdais' No. 11 car after the running of the 2015 Indianapolis 500 where he placed 11th

On 20 May 2017, Bourdais was involved in a single-car accident while qualifying for the Indianapolis 500. He suffered multiple fractures to his pelvis and a fracture to his right hip. The surgery was successful but Bourdais was forced to sit out for most of the season to recover. Bourdais would return at Gateway and run the final three races of the season.

In 2018, Bourdais returned to the Dale Coyne Racing Team now partnered with investors James "Sulli" Sullivan and former driver Jimmy Vasser as Dale Coyne Racing with Vasser Sullivan. The team also found steady sponsorship in the form of SealMaster and SportClips Haircuts. Bourdais started The Firestone St. Petersburg Grand Prix in fourteenth place. He ended up losing a tire on the opening lap but the misfortunes of Will Power and Tony Kanaan saved him from going a lap down. He went on an off sequence pit strategy and found himself 3rd with a handful of laps to go. On the final restart, Alexander Rossi divebombed the first corner and got his tires locked up on the slick airport runway paint and got into race leader Robert Wickens who had led 67 laps that day and Bourdais snuck by to win. It was his first win since last year at St. Petersburg and his first since the injury. Bourdais was emotional in victory lane and said "he never doubted that he would run in IndyCar again". Bourdais went on to win pole at the very next race in Phoenix, his first on an oval since 2006. Bourdais was also the only driver to lead laps at each of the first four races of the 2018 Verizon IndyCar Series season.

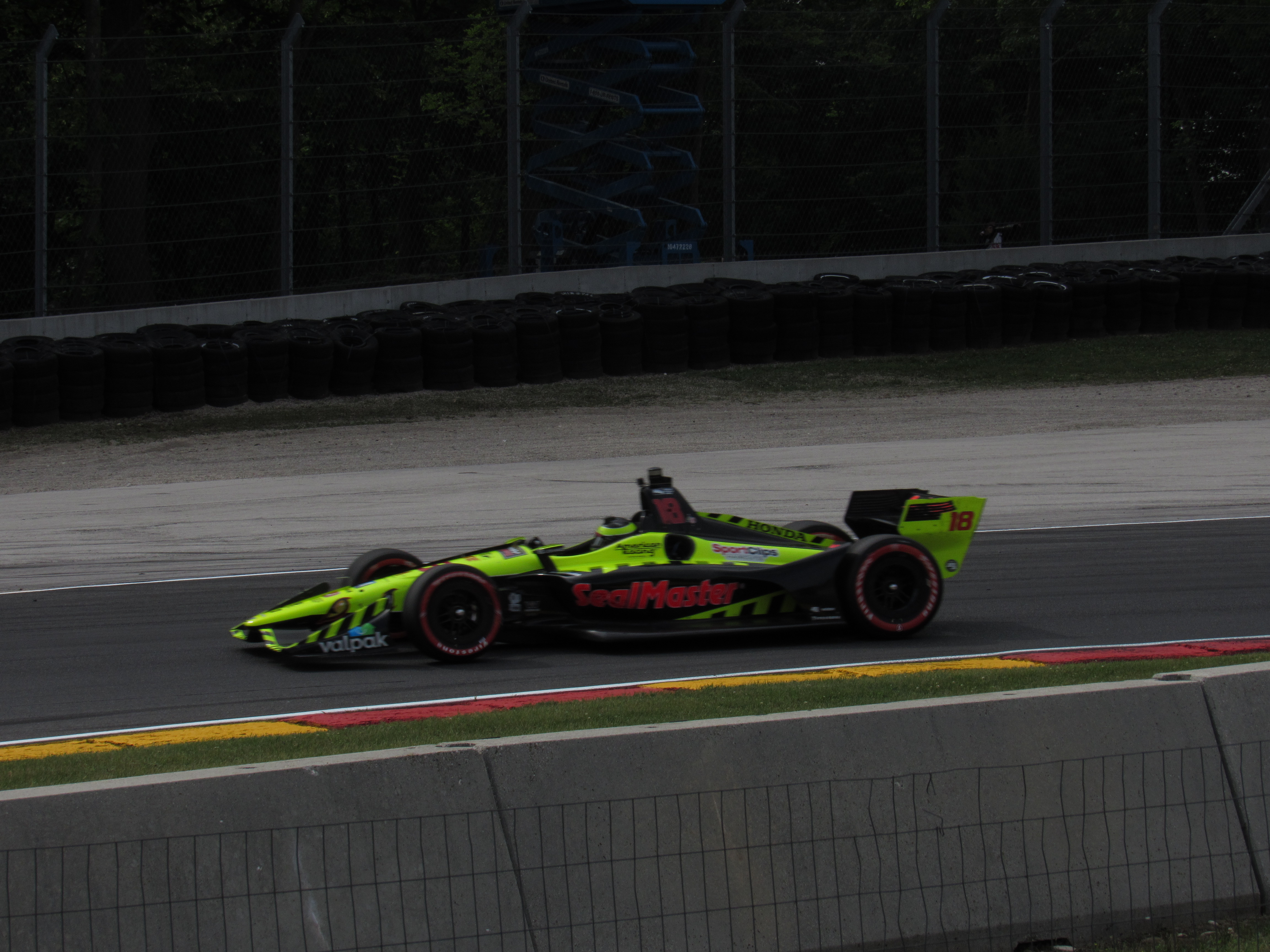
Bourdais competing at Road America during the 2018 IndyCar Series.

On 22 November 2019, Dale Coyne Racing announced that Bourdais would not return to the team in 2020.

On 4 February 2020, it was announced that Bourdais joined A. J. Foyt Racing to drive part-time in the 2020 IndyCar Series season, running the races at St. Petersburg, Barber Motorsports Park, Long Beach and Portland. He finished fourth in the rescheduled St. Petersburg finale, an effort that kept the entry in the Leaders' Circle program for 2021. On 15 September, Bourdais was confirmed as a full-time driver for Foyt in 2021. At the season finale at Long Beach Bourdais announced that 2021 would be his last year competing full time in the IndyCar Series and that he intended to focus his efforts on sports car racing in the future. Bourdais however did not rule out racing in a select number of IndyCar events in 2022 and beyond, including the Indianapolis 500.

== Other racing ==
In 2005, Bourdais competed in the 29th season of the International Race of Champions, racing stock cars against a field of twelve drivers from eight different US-based racing series, winning one race in the four-race season and finishing fifth in the overall standings.

== Motorsports career results ==
=== Career summary ===
Season	Series	Team name	Races	Wins	Poles	Points	Position
1995	French Formula Renault Campus	?	10	0	0	194	9th
1996	French Formula Renault 2.0	La Filière	15	0	0	66	7th
1997	French Formula Renault 2.0	La Filière	18	4	5	172	**2nd**
1997	Eurocup Formula Renault 2.0	La Filière	?	?	?	26	10th
1998	French Formula 3 Championship	La Filière	22	0	0	98	6th
1998	British Formula 3 Championship	La Filière	1	0	0	0	NC
1998	Masters of Formula 3	La Filière	1	0	0	N/A	20th
1998	Macau Grand Prix	Équipe de France	1	0	0	N/A	NC
1999	French Formula 3 Championship	La Filière	20	8	3	229	**1st**
1999	FIA European Formula Three Cup	La Filière	1	0	0	N/A	NC
1999	Masters of Formula 3	La Filière	1	0	0	N/A	10th
1999	24 Hours of Le Mans - GTS	Larbre Compétition	1	0	0	N/A	NC
1999	Macau Grand Prix	Équipe de France	1	0	0	N/A	NC
2000	International Formula 3000	Gauloises Formula	10	0	1	9	9th
2000	24 Hours of Le Mans - LMP 900	Pescarolo Sport	1	0	0	N/A	4th
2000	American Le Mans Series - LMP	Pescarolo Sport	1	0	0	13	53rd
2001	International Formula 3000	DAMS	12	1	1	26	4th
2001	24 Hours of Le Mans - LMP 900	Pescarolo Sport	1	0	0	N/A	4th
2001	American Le Mans Series - LMP 900	Pescarolo Sport	1	0	0	18	31st
2001	FIA Sportscar Championship - SR1	Pescarolo Sport	2	0	0	0	NC
2001	FFSA GT Championship - GT Cup	Larbre Compétition	1	0	1	13	42nd
2001	FIA GT Championship	Larbre Compétition	2	0	0	12	17th
2002	Formula One	Arrows	Test driver				
2002	Formula One	Renault	Test driver				
2002	International Formula 3000	Super Nova Racing	12	3	6	56	**1st**
2002	24 Hours of Le Mans - LMP 900	Pescarolo Sport	1	0	0	N/A	10th
2002	FIA Sportscar Championship - SR1	Pescarolo Sport	3	2	1	55	4th
2002	FIA GT Championship	Larbre Compétition	2	1	0	20	14th
2003	CART Champ Car World Series	Newman/Haas Racing	18	3	5	159	4th
2003	1000 km of Le Mans	Pescarolo Sport	1	0	0	N/A	**2nd**
2004	Champ Car World Series	Newman/Haas Racing	14	7	8	369	**1st**
2004	24 Hours of Le Mans	Pescarolo Sport	1	0	0	N/A	NC
2005	Champ Car World Series	Newman/Haas Racing	13	6	6	348	**1st**
2005	IndyCar Series	Newman/Haas Racing	1	0	0	18	28th
2005	International Race of Champions	N/A	4	1	2	46	5th
2005	American Le Mans Series - GT1	Larbre Compétition	1	0	0	0	NC
2005	Rolex Sports Car Series	Newman Racing/Silverstone Racing	1	0	0	6	89th
2006	Formula One	Scuderia Toro Rosso	Test driver				
2006	Champ Car World Series	Newman/Haas Racing	14	7	6	387	**1st**
2006	American Le Mans Series - GT2	Multimatic Motorsports Team Panoz	2	1	0	45	18th
2006	Rolex Sports Car Series	Doran Racing	1	0	0	3	108th
2006	Grand-Am Cup - GS	Multimatic Motorsports	1	0	0	24	94th
2007	Formula One	Scuderia Toro Rosso	Test driver				
2007	Champ Car World Series	Newman/Haas/Lanigan Racing	14	8	6	364	**1st**
2007	24 Hours of Le Mans	Team Peugeot Total	1	0	1	N/A	**2nd**
2008	Formula One	Scuderia Toro Rosso	18	0	0	4	17th
2009	Formula One	Scuderia Toro Rosso	9	0	0	2	19th
2009	24 Hours of Le Mans	Team Peugeot Total	1	0	0	N/A	**2nd**
2009	American Le Mans Series	Team Peugeot Total	1	0	0	26	23rd
2009	Superleague Formula	Sevilla FC	8	2	1	253^{1}	9th^{1}
2009	FFSA GT Championship	Larbre Compétition	2	0	0	0	NC
2010	Superleague Formula	Olympique Lyonnais	10	1	0	235^{2}	18th^{2}
2010	24 Hours of Le Mans	Team Peugeot Total	1	0	1	N/A	NC
2010	Le Mans Series	Team Peugeot Total	1	1	1	18	21st
2010	American Le Mans Series	Team Peugeot Total	1	0	0	0	NC
2010	Intercontinental Le Mans Cup	Team Peugeot Total	1	0	0	N/A	N/A
2010	Rolex Sports Car Series	Crown Royal/NPN Racing	1	0	0	0	69th
2010	V8 Supercar Championship Series	Tekno Autosports	2	0	0	N/A	NC
2011	IndyCar Series	Dale Coyne Racing	9	0	0	188	23rd
2011	24 Hours of Le Mans	Team Peugeot Total	1	0	0	N/A	**2nd**
2011	Le Mans Series	Team Peugeot Total	3	2	0	0	NC
2011	American Le Mans Series	Team Peugeot Total	1	0	0	N/A	NC
2011	Intercontinental Le Mans Cup	Team Peugeot Total	4	3	0	N/A	N/A
2011	International V8 Supercar Championship	Triple Eight Race Engineering	2	1	0	288	39th
2012	IndyCar Series	Dragon Racing	10	0	0	173	25th
2012	24 Hours of Le Mans	Pescarolo Team	1	0	0	N/A	NC
2012	FIA World Endurance Championship	Pescarolo Team	2	0	0	0.5	86th
2012	Rolex Sports Car Series	Starworks Motorsport	3	1	0	97	17th
2012	International V8 Supercar Championship	Triple Eight Race Engineering	2	1	0	0	NC
2013	IndyCar Series	Dragon Racing	19	0	0	370	12th
2013	Grand-Am Rolex Sports Car Series	Starworks Motorsport	7	0	0	160	18th
2014	IndyCar Series	KV Racing Technology	19	1	2	461	10th
2014	United SportsCar Championship - Prototype	Action Express Racing	3	1	1	100	24th
2015	IndyCar Series	KV Racing Technology	16	2	0	406	10th
2015	United SportsCar Championship - Prototype	Action Express Racing	3	2	0	105	11th
2015	International V8 Supercar Championship	Charlie Schwerkolt Racing	4	0	0	423	38th
2016	IndyCar Series	KVSH Racing	16	1	0	404	14th
2016	IMSA SportsCar Championship - GTLM	Ford Chip Ganassi Racing	3	0	0	82	15th
2016	24 Hours of Le Mans - LMGTE Pro	Ford Chip Ganassi Racing	1	1	0	N/A	**1st**
2017	IndyCar Series	Dale Coyne Racing	8	1	0	214	21st
2017	IMSA SportsCar Championship - GTLM	Ford Chip Ganassi Racing	3	1	0	91	12th
2018	IndyCar Series	Dale Coyne Racing with Vasser Sullivan	17	1	1	425	7th
2018	IMSA SportsCar Championship - GTLM	Ford Chip Ganassi Racing	3	0	0	78	13th
2018	24 Hours of Le Mans - LMGTE Pro	Ford Chip Ganassi Racing	1	0	0	N/A	**3rd**
2019	IndyCar Series	Dale Coyne Racing with Vasser Sullivan	17	0	0	387	11th
2019	IMSA SportsCar Championship - GTLM	Ford Chip Ganassi Racing	5	0	1	131	12th
2019	24 Hours of Le Mans - LMGTE Pro	Ford Chip Ganassi Racing	1	0	0	N/A	DSQ
2020	IMSA SportsCar Championship - DPi	JDC-Mustang Sampling Racing	9	0	0	249	5th
2020	IndyCar Series	A. J. Foyt Enterprises	3	0	0	53	28th
2021	IndyCar Series	A. J. Foyt Enterprises	16	0	0	258	16th
2021	IMSA SportsCar Championship - DPi	JDC-Mustang Sampling Racing	4	1	0	1180	13th
2022	IMSA SportsCar Championship - DPi	Cadillac Racing	10	3	4	3220	**3rd**
2022	FIA World Endurance Championship - LMP2	Vector Sport	5	0	0	21	14th
2022	24 Hours of Le Mans - LMP2	Vector Sport	1	0	0	N/A	22nd
2023	IMSA SportsCar Championship - GTP	Cadillac Racing	9	1	0	2673	7th
2023	24 Hours of Le Mans - Hypercar	Cadillac Racing	1	0	0	N/A	4th
2024	IMSA SportsCar Championship - GTP	Cadillac Racing	9	2	2	2864	**3rd**
2024	FIA World Endurance Championship - Hypercar	Cadillac Racing	2	0	0	12	25th
2025	FIA World Endurance Championship – Hypercar	Cadillac Hertz Team Jota	8	0	0	46	10th
2025	IMSA SportsCar Championship - LMP2	Tower Motorsports	6	0	0	1517	19th
2026	IMSA SportsCar Championship - LMP2	Tower Motorsports	1	0	0	250	39th
2026	Mazda MX-5 Cup	McCumbee McAleer Racing					
2026	FIA World Endurance Championship - Hypercar	Cadillac Hertz Team Jota	8	1	0	81	4th
2026	IMSA SportsCar Championship - GTD Pro	DragonSpeed	1	0	0	268	36th

Notes

- ^{1} Includes points scored by other Sevilla FC drivers.
- ^{2} Includes points scored by other Olympique Lyonnais drivers.

=== Complete International Formula 3000 results ===
(key) (Races in bold indicate pole position; races in italics indicate fastest lap)

Year	Entrant	1	2	3	4	5	6	7	8	9	10	11	12	DC	Points
2000	Gauloises Formula	IMO; Ret	SIL; 10	CAT; 8	NÜR; 4	MON; Ret	**MAG**; 2	A1R; 9	HOC; DNS	HUN; 14	SPA; Ret			9th	9
2001	DAMS	INT; 3	IMO; Ret	CAT; 11	**A1R**; Ret	MON; 4	NÜR; 8	MAG; 6	SIL; 1	HOC; 4	HUN; 3	SPA; 6	MNZ; 9	4th	26
2002	Super Nova Racing	**INT**; 14	**IMO**; 1	**CAT**; 3	A1R; Ret	**MON**; 1	**NÜR**; 1	SIL; 2	MAG; 2	HOC; Ret	HUN; 3	**SPA**; 2	MNZ; Ret	1st	56

=== American open–wheel racing results ===
(key)

==== CART/Champ Car ====
Year	Team	No.	Chassis	Engine	1	2	3	4	5	6	7	8	9	10	11	12	13	14	15	16	17	18	Rank	Points	Ref
2003	Newman/Haas Racing	2	Lola B02/00	Ford XFE V8 t	**STP**; 11	**MTY**; 17	LBH; 16	BRH; 1	**LAU**; 1	MIL; 9	LAG; 17	POR; 14	**CLE**; 1	TOR; 4	VAN; 3	ROA; 2	MOH; 5	MTL; 19	DEN; 2	MIA; 17	MXC; 2	**SRF**; 17	4th	159	
2004	Newman/Haas Racing	2	Lola B02/00	Ford XFE V8 t	LBH; 3	**MTY**; 1	MIL; 18	**POR**; 1	CLE; 1	**TOR**; 1	VAN; 5	**ROA**; 3	**DEN**; 1	**MTL**; 15	**LAG**; 8	LVS; 1	SRF; 2	**MXC**; 1					1st	369^{^}	
2005	Newman/Haas Racing	1	Lola B02/00	Ford XFE V8 t	LBH; 1	**MTY**; 5	MIL; 6	POR; 2	CLE; 5	**TOR**; 5	EDM; 1	**SJO**; 1	DEN; 1	**MTL**; 4	**LVS**; 1	SRF; 1	MXC; 17						1st	348	
2006	Newman/Haas Racing	1	Lola B02/00	Ford XFE V8 t	**LBH**; 1	HOU; 1	**MTY**; 1	**MIL**; 1	POR; 3	CLE; 18	TOR; 3	**EDM**; 2	**SJO**; 1	**DEN**; 7	**MTL**; 1	ROA; 3	SRF; 8	MXC; 1					1st	387	
2007	Newman/Haas/Lanigan Racing	1	Panoz DP01	Cosworth XFE V8 t	LVS; 13	**LBH**; 1	HOU; 1	POR; 1	**CLE**; 12	MTT; 2	**TOR**; 9	EDM; 1	SJO; 5	**ROA**; 1	**ZOL**; 1	**ASN**; 7	SRF; 1	MXC; 1					1st	364	

Years	Teams	Races	Poles	Wins	Top 5s	Top 10s	Championships
5	1	73	31	31	52	59	4

^{^} New points system introduced in 2004

==== IndyCar Series ====
(key)

Year	Team	No.	Chassis	Engine	1	2	3	4	5	6	7	8	9	10	11	12	13	14	15	16	17	18	19	Rank	Points	Ref
2005	Newman/Haas Racing	37	Panoz GF09C	Honda	HMS	PHX	STP	MOT	INDY; 12	TXS	RIR	KAN	NSH	MIL	MCH	KTY	PPIR	SNM	CHI	WGL	FON			28th	18	
2011	Dale Coyne Racing	19	Dallara IR-05	Honda	STP; DNS	ALA; 11	LBH; 27	SAO; 26	INDY	TXS	TXS	MIL	IOW	TOR; 6	EDM; 6	MOH; 9	NHM	SNM; 6	BAL; 28	MOT; 6	KTY	LVS		23rd	188	
2012	Lotus-Dragon Racing	7	Dallara DW12	Lotus	STP; 21	ALA; 9	LBH; 17	SAO; 18																25th	173	
2012	Dragon Racing	7	Dallara DW12	Chevrolet					INDY; 20	DET; 24	TXS	MIL	IOW	TOR; 14	EDM; 15	MOH; 4	SNM; 22	BAL; 23	FON					25th	173	
2013	Dragon Racing	7	Dallara DW12	Chevrolet	STP; 11	ALA; 16	LBH; 15	SAO; 14	INDY; 29	DET; 24	DET; 11	TXS; 20	MIL; 22	IOW; 14	POC; 16	TOR; 2	TOR; 3	MOH; 12	SNM; 10	BAL; 3	HOU; 8	HOU; 5	FON; 12	12th	370	
2014	KV Racing Technology	11	Dallara DW12	Chevrolet	STP; 13	LBH; 14	ALA; 15	IMS; 4	INDY; 7	DET; 13	DET; 20	TXS; 20	HOU; 4	HOU; 5	POC; 16	IOW; 19	**TOR**; 1	TOR; 9	**MOH**; 2	MIL; 12	SNM; 11	FON; 18		10th	461	
2015	KV Racing Technology	11	Dallara DW12	Chevrolet	STP; 6	NLA; 21	LBH; 6	ALA; 8	IMS; 4	INDY; 11	DET; 14	DET; 1	TXS; 14	TOR; 5	FON; 14	MIL; 1	IOW; 9	MOH; 17	POC; 23	SNM; 20				10th	406	
2016	KVSH Racing	11	Dallara DW12	Chevrolet	STP; 21	PHX; 8	LBH; 9	ALA; 16	IMS; 24	INDY; 9	DET; 1	DET; 8	ROA; 18	IOW; 8	TOR; 7	MOH; 20	POC; 5	TXS; 10	WGL; 5	SNM; 10				14th	404	
2017	Dale Coyne Racing	18	Dallara DW12	Honda	STP; 1	LBH; 2	ALA; 8	PHX; 19	IMS; 22	INDY; Wth	DET	DET	TXS	ROA	IOW	TOR	MOH	POC	GTW; 10	WGL; 17	SNM; 9			21st	214	
2018	Dale Coyne Racing with Vasser-Sullivan	18	Dallara DW12	Honda	STP; 1	**PHX**; 13	LBH; 13	ALA; 5	IMS; 4	INDY; 28	DET; 13	DET; 21	TXS; 8	ROA; 13	IOW; 11	TOR; 19	MOH; 6	POC; 4	GTW; 21	POR; 3	SNM; 6			7th	425	
2019	Dale Coyne Racing with Vasser-Sullivan	18	Dallara DW12	Honda	STP; 24	COA; 5	ALA; 3	LBH; 11	IMS; 11	INDY; 30	DET; 11	DET; 9	TXS; 8	ROA; 12	TOR; 8	IOW; 9	MOH; 11	POC; 7	GTW; 19	POR; 9	LAG; 7			11th	387	
2020	A. J. Foyt Enterprises	14	Dallara DW12	Chevrolet	TXS	IMS	ROA	ROA	IOW	IOW	INDY	GTW	GTW	MOH	MOH	IMS; 21	IMS; 18	STP; 4						28th	53	
2021	A. J. Foyt Enterprises	14	Dallara DW12	Chevrolet	ALA; 5	STP; 10	TXS; 24	TXS; 19	IMS; 19	INDY; 26	DET; 11	DET; 16	ROA; 16	MOH; 11	NSH; 27	IMS; 15	GTW; 5	POR; 18	LAG; 14	LBH; 8				16th	258	

Years	Teams	Races	Poles	Wins	Top 5s	Top 10s	Championships
6	4	74	2	6	14	28	0

==== Indianapolis 500 ====
Year	Chassis	Engine	Start	Finish	Team
2005	Panoz	Honda	15	12	Newman/Haas
2012	Dallara	Chevrolet	25	20	Dragon Racing
2013	Dallara	Chevrolet	15	29	Dragon Racing
2014	Dallara	Chevrolet	17	7	KV Racing Technology
2015	Dallara	Chevrolet	7	11	KV Racing Technology
2016	Dallara	Chevrolet	19	9	KVSH Racing
2017	Dallara	Honda	Wth		Dale Coyne Racing
2018	Dallara	Honda	5	28	Dale Coyne Racing with Vasser-Sullivan
2019	Dallara	Honda	7	30	Dale Coyne Racing with Vasser-Sullivan
2021	Dallara	Chevrolet	27	26	A. J. Foyt Enterprises

=== Complete Formula One results ===
(key)

Year	Entrant	Chassis	Engine	1	2	3	4	5	6	7	8	9	10	11	12	13	14	15	16	17	18	WDC	Points
2008	Scuderia Toro Rosso	Toro Rosso STR2B	Ferrari 056 2.4 V8	AUS; 7^{†}	MAL; Ret	BHR; 15	ESP; Ret	TUR; Ret														17th	4
2008	Scuderia Toro Rosso	Toro Rosso STR3	Ferrari 056 2.4 V8						MON; Ret	CAN; 13	FRA; 17	GBR; 11	GER; 12	HUN; 18	EUR; 10	BEL; 7	ITA; 18	SIN; 12	JPN; 10	CHN; 13	BRA; 14	17th	4
2009	Scuderia Toro Rosso	Toro Rosso STR4	Ferrari 056 2.4 V8	AUS; 8	MAL; 10	CHN; 11	BHR; 13	ESP; Ret	MON; 8	TUR; 18	GBR; Ret	GER; Ret	HUN	EUR	BEL	ITA	SIN	JPN	BRA	ABU		19th	2

^{†} Did not finish the race but was classified as he completed more than 90% of the race distance.

=== Complete Superleague Formula results ===
(key) (Races in bold indicate pole position; races in italics indicate fastest lap)

Year	Team	1	2	3	4	5	6	7	8	9	10	11	12	13	14	15	16	17	18	19	20	21	22	23	24	Pos	Pts
2009	Sevilla FC Reid Motorsport	MAG; 1	MAG; 2	ZOL; 1	ZOL; 2	DON; 1	DON; 2	EST; 1; 11	EST; 2; 2	MNZ; 1; 1	MNZ; 2; 3	**JAR**; **1**; 2	JAR; 2; 6													9th	253
2010	Olympique Lyonnais LRS Formula	SIL; 1; 15	SIL; 2; 1	ASS; 1; 17	ASS; 2 DNS	MAG; 1; 9	MAG; 2; 15	JAR; 1; 7	JAR; 2; 18	NÜR; 1; 14	NÜR; 2; 17	ZOL; 1	ZOL; 2	BRH; 1	BRH; 2	ADR; 1	ADR; 2	POR; 1	POR; 2	ORD; 1	ORD; 2	BEI; 1	BEI; 2	NAV; 1	NAV; 2	18th	235

==== Super Final results ====
(key) (Races in bold indicate pole position; races in italics indicate fastest lap)

Year	Team	1	2	3	4	5	6	7	8	9	10	11	12
2009	Sevilla FC Reid Motorsport	MAG	ZOL	DON	EST; 1	MNZ; N/A	JAR; 2						
2010	Olympique Lyonnais LRS Formula	SIL; 4	ASS; DNQ	MAG; DNQ	JAR; DNQ	NÜR; DNQ	ZOL	BRH	ADR	POR	ORD	BEI	NAV

=== Sports car racing ===
==== Le Mans 24 Hours results ====
Year	Team	Co-drivers	Car	Class	Laps	Pos.	Class pos.
1999	(France) Larbre Compétition	(France) Jean-Pierre Jarier (France) Pierre de Thoisy	Porsche 911 GT2	GTS	134	DNF	DNF
2000	(France) Pescarolo Sport	(France) Olivier Grouillard (France) Emmanuel Clérico	Courage C52-Peugeot	LMP900	344	4th	4th
2001	(France) Pescarolo Sport	(France) Jean-Christophe Boullion (France) Laurent Rédon	Courage C60-Peugeot	LMP900	271	13th	4th
2002	(France) Pescarolo Sport	(France) Jean-Christophe Boullion (France) Franck Lagorce	Courage C60-Peugeot	LMP900	343	10th	9th
2004	(France) Pescarolo Sport	(France) Emmanuel Collard (France) Nicolas Minassian	Courage C60-Judd	LMP1	282	DNF	DNF
2007	(France) Team Peugeot Total	(France) Stéphane Sarrazin (Portugal) Pedro Lamy	Peugeot 908 HDi FAP	LMP1	359	**2nd**	**2nd**
2009	(France) Team Peugeot Total	(France) Stéphane Sarrazin (France) Franck Montagny	Peugeot 908 HDi FAP	LMP1	381	**2nd**	**2nd**
2010	(France) Team Peugeot Total	(France) Simon Pagenaud (Portugal) Pedro Lamy	Peugeot 908 HDi FAP	LMP1	38	DNF	DNF
2011	(France) Team Peugeot Total	(France) Simon Pagenaud (Portugal) Pedro Lamy	Peugeot 908	LMP1	355	**2nd**	**2nd**
2012	(France) Pescarolo Team	(France) Nicolas Minassian (Japan) Seiji Ara	Dome S102.5-Judd	LMP1	203	NC	NC
2016	(United States) Ford Chip Ganassi Team USA	(United States) Joey Hand (Germany) Dirk Müller	Ford GT	GTE; Pro	340	18th	**1st**
2018	(United States) Ford Chip Ganassi Team USA	(United States) Joey Hand (Germany) Dirk Müller	Ford GT	GTE; Pro	343	17th	**3rd**
2019	(United States) Ford Chip Ganassi Team USA	(United States) Joey Hand (Germany) Dirk Müller	Ford GT	GTE; Pro	342	DSQ	DSQ
2020	(United States) Risi Competizione	(France) Jules Gounon (France) Olivier Pla	Ferrari 488 GTE Evo	GTE; Pro	339	23rd	4th
2022	(United Kingdom) Vector Sport	(Republic of Ireland) Ryan Cullen (Switzerland) Nico Müller	Oreca 07-Gibson	LMP2	357	27th	22nd
2023	(United States) Cadillac Racing	(New Zealand) Scott Dixon (Netherlands) Renger van der Zande	Cadillac V-Series.R	Hypercar	340	4th	4th
2024	(United States) Cadillac Racing	(New Zealand) Scott Dixon (Netherlands) Renger van der Zande	Cadillac V-Series.R	Hypercar	223	DNF	DNF
2025	(United States) Cadillac Hertz Team Jota	(New Zealand) Earl Bamber (United Kingdom) Jenson Button	Cadillac V-Series.R	Hypercar	386	7th	7th
2026	(United States) Cadillac Hertz Team Jota	(United Kingdom) Jack Aitken (New Zealand) Earl Bamber	Cadillac V-Series.R	Hypercar	218	DNF	DNF

==== American Le Mans Series results ====
Year	Entrant	Class	Chassis	Engine	1	2	3	4	5	6	7	8	9	10	11	12	Rank	Points	Ref
2000	Pescarolo Sport	LMP	Courage C52	Peugeot A32 3.2L Turbo V6	SEB	CHA	SIL; 7	NÜR	SNM	MOS	TEX	POR	PET	LAG	LSV	ADE	53rd	13	
2001	Pescarolo Sport	LMP900	Courage C60	Peugeot A32 3.2L Turbo V6	TEX	SEB; 7	DON	JAR	SNM	POR	MOS	MOH	LAG	PET			31st	18	
2005	Larbre Compétition	GT1	Ferrari 550-GTS Maranello	Ferrari 5.9L V12	SEB; 10	ATL	MOH	LRP	SNM	POR	ROA	MOS	PET	LAG			NC	0	
2006	Multimatic Motorsports Team Panoz	GT2	Panoz Esperante GT-LM	Ford (Élan) 5.0L V8	SEB; 1	HOU	MOH	LRP	UTA	POR	ROA	MOS	PET; 3	LAG			18th	45	
2009	Team Peugeot Total	LMP1	Peugeot 908 HDi FAP	Peugeot HDI 5.5 L Turbo V12 (Diesel)	SEB; 2	STP	LBH	UTA	LRP	MOH	ROA	MOS	PET	LAG			23rd	26	
2010	Team Peugeot Total	LMP1	Peugeot 908 HDi FAP	Peugeot HDI 5.5 L Turbo V12 (Diesel)	SEB; 2	LBH	LAG	UTA	LRP	MOH	ROA	MOS	PET				NC	0	
2011	Peugeot Sport Total	LMP1	Peugeot 908	Peugeot HDI 3.7 L Turbo V8 (Diesel)	SEB	LBH	LRP	MOS	MOH	ROA	BAL	LAG	PET^{1} 11				NC	N/A	

^{1} Driver competed for the Intercontinental Le Mans Cup, no points awarded for the American Le Mans Series.

==== Le Mans Series results ====
Year	Entrant	Class	Chassis	Engine	1	2	3	4	5	Rank	Points
2010	Team Peugeot Total	LMP1	Peugeot 908 HDi FAP	Peugeot HDI 5.5 L Turbo V12 (Diesel)	CAS	SPA; 1	ALG	HUN	SIL	21st	18
2011	Peugeot Sport Total	LMP1	Peugeot 908	Peugeot HDI 3.7 L Turbo V8 (Diesel)	CAS	SPA; 8	IMO^{1} 1	SIL^{1} 1	EST	NC	0

^{1} Driver competed for the Intercontinental Le Mans Cup, no points awarded for the Le Mans Series.

==== Intercontinental Le Mans Cup results ====
Year	Entrant	Class	Chassis	Engine	1	2	3	4	5	6	7
2010	Team Peugeot Total	LMP1	Peugeot 908 HDi FAP	Peugeot HDI 5.5 L Turbo V12 (Diesel)	SIL	PET	ZHU; 4				
2011	Peugeot Sport Total	LMP1	Peugeot 908	Peugeot HDI 3.7 L Turbo V8 (Diesel)	SEB	SPA^{1} 8	LEM^{1} 2	IMO; 1	SIL; 1	PET ovr:48 cls:11	ZHU; 1

^{1} Driver did not run for the Intercontinental Le Mans Cup.

==== FIA World Endurance Championship results ====
Year	Entrant	Class	Chassis	Engine	1	2	3	4	5	6	7	8	Rank	Points
2012	Pescarolo Team	LMP1	Dome S102.5	Dome S102.5	SEB	SPA; 15	LMS; NC	SIL	SÃO	BHR	FUJ	SHA	86th	0.5
2022	Vector Sport	LMP2	Oreca 07	Gibson GK428 4.2 L V8	SEB	SPA; 10	LMS; 13	MNZ; 3	FUJ; 9	BHR; 9			14th	21
2024	Cadillac Racing	Hypercar	Cadillac V-Series.R	Cadillac LMC55R 5.5 L V8	QAT; DSQ	IMO	SPA	LMS	SAP	COA	FUJ	BHR; 6	25th	12
2025	Cadillac Hertz Team Jota	Hypercar	Cadillac V-Series.R	Cadillac LMC55R 5.5 L V8	QAT; 16	IMO; 16	SPA; 6	LMS; 7	SÃO; 2	COA; 6	FUJ; 13	BHR; 16	10th	46
2026	Cadillac Hertz Team Jota	Hypercar	Cadillac V-Series.R	Cadillac LMC55R 5.5 L V8	IMO; 8	SPA; Ret	LMS; Ret	SÃO; 4	COA; 2	FUJ; 5	CAT; 4	MNZ; 1	4th	81

==== 24 Hours of Daytona results ====
Year	Team	Co-drivers	Car	Class	Laps	Pos.	Class pos.
2005	(United States) Newman Racing/Silverstone Racing	(United States) Paul Newman (United States) Michael Brockman (Brazil) Cristiano da Matta	Crawford DP03-Ford	DP	290	DNF	DNF
2006	(United States) Doran Racing	(United States) B. J. Zacharias (Brazil) Raul Boesel	Doran JE4-Ford	DP	156	DNF	DNF
2010	(United States) Crown Royal/NPN Racing	(France) Christophe Bouchut (France) Emmanuel Collard (Germany) Sascha Maassen (United States) Scott Tucker	Riley Mk. XI-BMW	DP	619	DNF	DNF
2013	(United States) Starworks Motorsport	(United Kingdom) Ryan Dalziel (United Kingdom) Allan McNish (Venezuela) Alex Popow	Riley Mk. XXVI-Ford	DP	696	6th	6th
2014	(United States) Action Express Racing	(Brazil) Christian Fittipaldi (Portugal) João Barbosa	Coyote Corvette Daytona Prototype	P	695	**1st**	**1st**
2015	(United States) Action Express Racing	(Brazil) Christian Fittipaldi (Portugal) João Barbosa	Coyote Corvette Daytona Prototype	P	740	**2nd**	**2nd**
2016	(United States) Ford Chip Ganassi Racing	(United States) Joey Hand (Germany) Dirk Müller	Ford GT	GTLM	690	31st	7th
2017	(United States) Ford Chip Ganassi Racing	(United States) Joey Hand (Germany) Dirk Müller	Ford GT	GTLM	652	5th	**1st**
2018	(United States) Ford Chip Ganassi Racing	(United States) Joey Hand (Germany) Dirk Müller	Ford GT	GTLM	783	12th	**2nd**
2019	(United States) Ford Chip Ganassi Racing	(United States) Joey Hand (Germany) Dirk Müller	Ford GT	GTLM	559	28th	7th
2020	(United States) JDC-Mustang Sampling Racing	(Portugal) João Barbosa (France) Loïc Duval	Cadillac DPi-V.R	DPi	833	**3rd**	**3rd**
2021	(United States) JDC-Mustang Sampling Racing	(France) Loïc Duval (France) Tristan Vautier	Cadillac DPi-V.R	DPi	723	DNF	DNF
2022	(United States) Cadillac Racing	(New Zealand) Scott Dixon (Spain) Álex Palou (Netherlands) Renger van der Zande	Cadillac DPi-V.R	DPi	722	14th	7th
2023	(United States) Cadillac Racing	(New Zealand) Scott Dixon (Netherlands) Renger van der Zande	Cadillac V-Series.R	GTP	783	**3rd**	**3rd**
2024	(United States) Cadillac Racing	(New Zealand) Scott Dixon (Spain) Álex Palou (Netherlands) Renger van der Zande	Cadillac V-Series.R	GTP	423	DNF	DNF
2025	(Canada) Tower Motorsports	(Mexico) Sebastián Álvarez (Canada) John Farano (Netherlands) Job van Uitert	Oreca 07-Gibson	LMP2	765	8th	**1st**

==== Grand-Am Rolex Sports Car Series results ====
(key) (Races in bold indicate pole position, Results are overall/class)

Year	Team	Make	Engine	Class	1	2	3	4	5	6	7	8	9	10	11	12	13	14	Rank	Points
2005	Newman Racing/Silverstone Racing	Crawford DP03	Ford	DP	DAY; 25	HMS	FON	LAG	MTT	WGL	ALA	WGL	DAY	MOH	PHX	WGL	VIR	MEX	89th	6
2006	Doran Racing	Doran JE4	Ford	DP	DAY; 28	MEX	HMS	LBH	VIR	LAG	PHX	LRP	WGL	DAY	ALA	WGL	SNM	UTA	108th	3
2010	Crown Royal/NPN Racing	Riley Mk. XI	BMW 5.0L V8	DP	DAY; 9†	HMS	ALA	VIR	LRP	LAG	WGL	MOH	DAY	NJM	WGL	MTL	UTA		NC	0
2012	Starworks Motorsport	Riley Mk. XXVI	Ford	DP	DAY	ALA	HMS	NJM	DET	MOH	ROA	WGL; 3	IMS; 1	WGL; 2	MTL	LAG	LRP		17th	97
2013	Starworks Motorsport	Riley Mk XXVI	Ford	DP	DAY; 6	COA	ALA	ATL	DET	MOH	WGL; 8	IMS; 11	ROA; 9	KAN; 13	LAG; 5	LRP; 5			18th	160

† Bourdais did not complete sufficient laps to score points

Series Summary

Years	Teams	Starts	Poles	Wins	Podiums (Non-win)	Top 10s (Non-podium)	Championships
5	4	7	0	1	2	1	0

==== 24 Hours of Spa results ====
Year	Team	Co-Drivers	Car	Class	Laps	Pos.	Class Pos.
2001	(France) Larbre Compétition Chéreau	(France) Patrice Goueslard (France) Sébastien Dumez	Chrysler Viper GTS-R	GT	523	2nd	2nd
2002	(France) Larbre Compétition Chéreau	(France) Christophe Bouchut (France) David Terrien (Belgium) Vincent Vosse	Chrysler Viper GTS-R	GT	526	1st	1st

=== Complete IMSA SportsCar Championship results ===
(key) (Races in bold indicate pole position; races in italics indicate fastest lap)

Year	Team	No.	Class	Make	Engine	1	2	3	4	5	6	7	8	9	10	11	Rank	Points	Ref
2014	Action Express Racing	5	P	Coyote Corvette DP	Chevrolet 5.5 L V8	DAY; 1	SEB; 3	LBH	LGA	DET	WGL	MOS	IMS	ELK	COA	PET; 2	24th	100	
2015	Action Express Racing	5	P	Coyote Corvette DP	Chevrolet 5.5 L V8	DAY; 2	SEB; 1	LGA	LGA	DET	WGL	MOS	ELK	COA	PET; 1		11th	105	
2016	Ford Chip Ganassi Racing	66	GTLM	Ford GT	Ford 3.5 L EcoBoost V6	DAY; 7	SEB; 8	LBH	LGA	WGL	MOS	LIM	ELK	VIR	COA	PET; 2	15th	82	
2017	Ford Chip Ganassi Racing	66	GTLM	Ford GT	Ford EcoBoost 3.5 L Turbo V6	DAY; 1	SEB; 2	LBH	COA	WGL	MOS	LIM	ELK	VIR	LGA	PET; 7	12th	91	
2018	Ford Chip Ganassi Racing	66	GTLM	Ford GT	Ford EcoBoost 3.5 L Turbo V6	DAY; 2	SEB; 9	LBH	MOH	WGL	MOS	LIM	ELK	VIR	LGA	PET; 7	13th	78	
2019	Ford Chip Ganassi Racing	66	GTLM	Ford GT	Ford EcoBoost 3.5 L Turbo V6	DAY; 7	SEB; 2	LBH; 4	**MOH**; 7	WGL	MOS	LIM	ELK	VIR	LGA	PET; 8	12th	131	
2020	JDC-Mustang Sampling Racing	5	DPi	Cadillac DPi-V.R	Cadillac 5.5 L V8	DAY; 3	DAY; 3	SEB; 3	ELK; 4	ATL; 4	MOH; 6	PET; 4	LGA; 7	SEB; 5			5th	249	
2021	JDC-Mustang Sampling Racing	5	DPi	Cadillac DPi-V.R	Cadillac 5.5 L V8	DAY; 7	SEB; 1	MOH	DET	WGL; 7	WGL	ELK	LGA	LBH	PET; 7		13th	1180	
2022	Cadillac Racing	01	DPi	Cadillac DPi-V.R	Cadillac 5.5 L V8	DAY; 7	**SEB**; 7	**LBH**; 1	LGA; 6	**MOH**; 5	**DET**; 1	WGL; 3	MOS; 1	ELK; 3	PET; 4		3rd	3220	
2023	Cadillac Racing	01	GTP	Cadillac V-LMDh	Cadillac LMC55R 5. 5 L V8	DAY; 3	SEB; 7	LBH; 8	LGA; 1	WGL; 5	MOS; 9	ELK; 4	IMS; 7	PET; 2			7th	2673	
2024	Cadillac Racing	01	GTP	Cadillac V-Series.R	Cadillac LMC55R 5. 5 L V8	DAY; 10	SEB; 2	LBH; 1	**LGA**; 5	DET; 3	WGL; 2	ELK; 9	**IMS**; 6	PET; 1			3rd	2864	
2025	Tower Motorsports	8	LMP2	Oreca 07	Gibson GK428 4.2 L V8	DAY; 12	SEB; 2	WGL; 9	MOS	ELK; 7	IMS; 7	PET; 12					19th	1517	
2026	Tower Motorsports	8	LMP2	Oreca 07	Gibson GK428 4.2 L V8	DAY; 8											39th	250	
2026	DragonSpeed	74	GTD Pro	Chevrolet Corvette Z06 GT3.R	Chevrolet LT6.R 5.5 L V8		SEB	LGA	DET	WGL	MOS	ELK	VIR	IMS	PET; 6		36th	268	

=== Touring car racing ===
==== V8 Supercar results ====
Year	Team	Car	1	2	3	4	5	6	7	8	9	10	11	12	13	14	15	16	17	18	19	20	21	22	23	24	25	26	27	28	29	30	31	32	33	34	35	36	Pos.	Pts
2010	Tekno Autosports	Ford FG Falcon	YMC; R1	YMC; R2	BHR; R3	BHR; R4	ADE; R5	ADE; R6	HAM; R7	HAM; R8	QLD; R9	QLD; R10	WIN; R11	WIN; R12	HID; R13	HID; R14	TOW; R15	TOW; R16	PHI; Q	PHI; R17	BAT; R18	SUR; R19; 8	SUR; R20; 16	SYM; R21	SYM; R22	SAN; R23	SAN; R24	SYD; R25	SYD; R26										NC	0 †
2011	Triple Eight Race Engineering	Holden VE Commodore	YMC; R1	YMC; R2	ADE; R3	ADE; R4	HAM; R5	HAM; R6	BAR; R7	BAR; R8	BAR; R9	WIN; R10	WIN; R11	HID; R12	HID; R13	TOW; R14	TOW; R15	QLD; R16	QLD; R17	QLD; R18	PHI; Q	PHI; R19	BAT; R20	SUR; R21; 1	SUR; R22; 2	SYM; R23	SYM; R24	SAN; R25	SAN; R26	SYD; R27	SYD; R28								39th	288
2012	Triple Eight Race Engineering	Holden VE Commodore	ADE; R1	ADE; R2	SYM; R3	SYM; R4	HAM; R5	HAM; R6	BAR; R7	BAR; R8	BAR; R9	PHI; R10	PHI; R11	HID; R12	HID; R13	TOW; R14	TOW; R15	QLD; R16	QLD; R17	SMP; R18	SMP; R19	SAN; Q	SAN; R20	BAT; R21	SUR; R22; 1	SUR; R23; 2	YMC; R24	YMC; R25	YMC; R26	WIN; R27	WIN; R28	SYD; R29	SYD; R30						NC	0 †
2015	Team 18	Holden VF Commodore	ADE; R1	ADE; R2	ADE; R3	SYM; R4	SYM; R5	SYM; R6	BAR; R7	BAR; R8	BAR; R9	WIN; R10	WIN; R11	WIN; R12	HID; R13	HID; R14	HID; R15	TOW; R16	TOW; R17	QLD; R18	QLD; R19	QLD; R20	SMP; R21	SMP; R22	SMP; R23	SAN; R24; 7	BAT; R25; 9	SUR; R26; Ret	SUR; R27; 14	PUK; R28	PUK; R29	PUK; R30	PHI; R31	PHI; R32	PHI; R33	SYD; R34	SYD; R35	SYD; R36	38th	423

† Not eligible for points

==== Complete Bathurst 1000 results ====
Year	Team	Car	Co-driver	Position	Laps
2015	Charlie Schwerkolt Racing	Holden Commodore VF	(Australia) Lee Holdsworth	9th	161

==== International Race of Champions ====
Year	Make	1	2	3	4	Pos.	Pts	Ref
2005	Pontiac	**DAY**; 12	**TEX**; 1*	RCH; 10	ATL; 6	5th	46	

== Notes ==
Sporting positions
Preceded by David Saelens	French Formula Three Championship; Champion; 1999	Succeeded by Jonathan Cochet
Preceded by Justin Wilson	International Formula 3000; Champion; 2002	Succeeded by Björn Wirdheim
Preceded by Mario Domínguez	CART Rookie of the Year; 2003	Succeeded by A. J. Allmendinger (Champ Car Rookie of the Year)
Preceded by Paul Tracy	Champ Car World Series; Champion; 2004–2005–2006–2007	Succeeded by Scott Dixon (Champ Car folded into the IndyCar Series)
