= Rick Sutherland =

Australian rules footballer

Personal information
- Full name: Rick Sutherland
- Born: 5 November 1960 (age 65)
- Died: 10 February 2015 56 Years old Ballarat
- Original team: Golden Point
- Height: 196 cm (6 ft 5 in)
- Weight: 85 kg (187 lb)

Playing career^{1}
Years	Club	Games (Goals)
1981	St Kilda	9 (6)
- ^{1} Playing statistics correct to the end of 1981.

Rick Sutherland (5 November 1960 – 10 February 2015 ) was an Australian rules footballer who played with St Kilda in the Victorian Football League (VFL).
