= 2001 ELMS at Donington Park =

Layout of the Donington Park

The 2001 ELMS at Donington Park was the second race for the 2001 European Le Mans Series season as well as the third race of the American Le Mans Series season. It took place at Donington Park, United Kingdom, on April 14, 2001.

== Official results ==
Class winners in bold.

Pos	Class	No	Team	Drivers	Chassis	Tyre	Laps
Pos	Class	No	Team	Drivers	Engine	Tyre	Laps
1	**LMP900**	**1**	**(Germany) Audi Sport Team Joest**	**(Denmark) Tom Kristensen (Italy) Rinaldo Capello**	**Audi R8**	MI	**115**
1	**LMP900**	**1**	**(Germany) Audi Sport Team Joest**	**(Denmark) Tom Kristensen (Italy) Rinaldo Capello**	**Audi 3.6L Turbo V8**	MI	**115**
2	LMP900	2	(Germany) Audi Sport Team Joest	(Germany) Frank Biela (Italy) Emanuele Pirro	Audi R8	MI	114
2	LMP900	2	(Germany) Audi Sport Team Joest	(Germany) Frank Biela (Italy) Emanuele Pirro	Audi 3.6L Turbo V8	MI	114
3	LMP900	7	(United Kingdom) Johansson Motorsport (United Kingdom) Arena Motorsport	(Sweden) Stefan Johansson (United Kingdom) Guy Smith	Audi R8	MI	114
3	LMP900	7	(United Kingdom) Johansson Motorsport (United Kingdom) Arena Motorsport	(Sweden) Stefan Johansson (United Kingdom) Guy Smith	Audi 3.6L Turbo V8	MI	114
4	LMP900	72	(France) Pescarolo Sport	(France) Jean-Christophe Boullion (France) Laurent Rédon	Courage C60	MI	111
4	LMP900	72	(France) Pescarolo Sport	(France) Jean-Christophe Boullion (France) Laurent Rédon	Peugeot A32 3.2L Turbo V6	MI	111
5	LMP900	8	(United Kingdom) Westward Racing	(United States) Jay Cochran (United States) Peter Boss	Panoz LMP-1 Roadster-S	A	106
5	LMP900	8	(United Kingdom) Westward Racing	(United States) Jay Cochran (United States) Peter Boss	Élan 6L8 6.0L V8	A	106
6	LMP900	51	(United States) Panoz Motorsports	(Brazil) Gualter Salles (Germany) Klaus Graf	Panoz LMP07	MI	106
6	LMP900	51	(United States) Panoz Motorsports	(Brazil) Gualter Salles (Germany) Klaus Graf	Élan (Zytek) 4.0L V8	MI	106
7	**LMP675**	**21**	**(United Kingdom) Rowan Racing**	**(United Kingdom) Martin O'Connell (United Kingdom) Warren Carway**	**Pilbeam MP84**	A	**105**
7	**LMP675**	**21**	**(United Kingdom) Rowan Racing**	**(United Kingdom) Martin O'Connell (United Kingdom) Warren Carway**	**Nissan (AER) VQL 3.0L V6**	A	**105**
8	LMP900	50	(United States) Panoz Motorsports	(Denmark) Jan Magnussen (Australia) David Brabham	Panoz LMP07	MI	104
8	LMP900	50	(United States) Panoz Motorsports	(Denmark) Jan Magnussen (Australia) David Brabham	Élan (Zytek) 4.0L V8	MI	104
9	**GTS**	**41**	**(United Kingdom) Ray Mallock Ltd. (RML)**	**(Belgium) Bruno Lambert (United Kingdom) Ian McKellar Jr.**	**Saleen S7-R**	D	**102**
9	**GTS**	**41**	**(United Kingdom) Ray Mallock Ltd. (RML)**	**(Belgium) Bruno Lambert (United Kingdom) Ian McKellar Jr.**	**Ford 7.0L V8**	D	**102**
10	**GT**	**23**	**(United States) Alex Job Racing**	**(Germany) Lucas Luhr (Germany) Sascha Maassen**	**Porsche 911 GT3-RS**	MI	**102**
10	**GT**	**23**	**(United States) Alex Job Racing**	**(Germany) Lucas Luhr (Germany) Sascha Maassen**	**Porsche 3.6L Flat-6**	MI	**102**
11	GT	22	(United States) Alex Job Racing	(United States) Randy Pobst (Germany) Christian Menzel	Porsche 911 GT3-RS	MI	102
11	GT	22	(United States) Alex Job Racing	(United States) Randy Pobst (Germany) Christian Menzel	Porsche 3.6L Flat-6	MI	102
12	GTS	26	(Germany) Konrad Team Saleen	(United Kingdom) Oliver Gavin (Austria) Franz Konrad	Saleen S7-R	G	99
12	GTS	26	(Germany) Konrad Team Saleen	(United Kingdom) Oliver Gavin (Austria) Franz Konrad	Ford 7.0L V8	G	99
13	GT	60	(United Kingdom) P.K. Sport	(United Kingdom) Mike Youles (United Kingdom) Robin Liddell	Porsche 911 GT3-RS	D	98
13	GT	60	(United Kingdom) P.K. Sport	(United Kingdom) Mike Youles (United Kingdom) Robin Liddell	Porsche 3.6L Flat-6	D	98
14	GT	52	(Germany) Seikel Motorsport	(United Kingdom) Johnny Mowlem (Canada) Tony Burgess	Porsche 911 GT3-RS	Y	97
14	GT	52	(Germany) Seikel Motorsport	(United Kingdom) Johnny Mowlem (Canada) Tony Burgess	Porsche 3.6L Flat-6	Y	97
15	GT	69	(Canada) Kyser Racing	(Canada) Kye Wankum (United States) Joe Foster	Porsche 911 GT3-R	D	96
15	GT	69	(Canada) Kyser Racing	(Canada) Kye Wankum (United States) Joe Foster	Porsche 3.6L Flat-6	D	96
16	GT	65	(Spain) Paco Orti Racing	(Spain) Jésus Diez de Villarroel (Spain) Paco Orti	Porsche 911 GT3-R	D	96
16	GT	65	(Spain) Paco Orti Racing	(Spain) Jésus Diez de Villarroel (Spain) Paco Orti	Porsche 3.6L Flat-6	D	96
17	GT	53	(Germany) Seikel Motorsport	(Italy) Luca Drudi (Italy) Gabrio Rosa	Porsche 911 GT3-RS	Y	95
17	GT	53	(Germany) Seikel Motorsport	(Italy) Luca Drudi (Italy) Gabrio Rosa	Porsche 3.6L Flat-6	Y	95
18	GT	63	(France) Noël del Bello	(France) Marc Sourd (France) Georges Forgeois (France) Patrick Caternet	Porsche 911 GT3-R	D	92
18	GT	63	(France) Noël del Bello	(France) Marc Sourd (France) Georges Forgeois (France) Patrick Caternet	Porsche 3.6L Flat-6	D	92
19 DNF	GT	61	(United Kingdom) P.K. Sport	(United Kingdom) Mark Humphrey (United Kingdom) Piers Masarati	Porsche 911 GT3-R	D	82
19 DNF	GT	61	(United Kingdom) P.K. Sport	(United Kingdom) Mark Humphrey (United Kingdom) Piers Masarati	Porsche 3.6L Flat-6	D	82
20 DNF	GT	42	(Germany) BMW Motorsport (Germany) Team Schnitzer	(Finland) JJ Lehto (Germany) Jörg Müller	BMW M3 GTR	MI	81
20 DNF	GT	42	(Germany) BMW Motorsport (Germany) Team Schnitzer	(Finland) JJ Lehto (Germany) Jörg Müller	BMW 4.0L V8	MI	81
21	LMP900	6	(France) Team PlayStation (France) Oreca	(Monaco) Olivier Beretta (France) Yannick Dalmas	Chrysler LMP	MI	77
21	LMP900	6	(France) Team PlayStation (France) Oreca	(Monaco) Olivier Beretta (France) Yannick Dalmas	Mopar 6.0L V8	MI	77
22 DNF	GT	43	(Germany) BMW Motorsport (Germany) Team Schnitzer	(Sweden) Fredrik Ekblom (Germany) Dirk Müller	BMW M3 GTR	MI	45
22 DNF	GT	43	(Germany) BMW Motorsport (Germany) Team Schnitzer	(Sweden) Fredrik Ekblom (Germany) Dirk Müller	BMW 4.0L V8	MI	45
23 DNF	LMP900	3	(United Kingdom) Team Ascari	(South Africa) Werner Lupberger (United Kingdom) Ben Collins	Ascari A410	G	35
23 DNF	LMP900	3	(United Kingdom) Team Ascari	(South Africa) Werner Lupberger (United Kingdom) Ben Collins	Judd GV4 4.0L V10	G	35
24 DNF	GT	64	(United Kingdom) Sebah Automotive	(United States) Stephen Earle (United Kingdom) Hugh Hayden	Porsche 911 GT3-R	A	25
24 DNF	GT	64	(United Kingdom) Sebah Automotive	(United States) Stephen Earle (United Kingdom) Hugh Hayden	Porsche 3.6L Flat-6	A	25
25 DNF	LMP675	5	(United States) Dick Barbour Racing	(Belgium) Didier de Radiguès (Belgium) Eric van de Poele	Reynard 01Q	G	24
25 DNF	LMP675	5	(United States) Dick Barbour Racing	(Belgium) Didier de Radiguès (Belgium) Eric van de Poele	Judd GV675 3.4L V8	G	24

== Statistics ==
- Pole Position – #1 Audi Sport Team Joest – 1:22.122
- Fastest Lap – #1 Audi Sport Team Joest
- Distance – 462.3 km
- Average Speed – 167.34 km/h

European Le Mans Series
Previous race: 2001 12 Hours of Sebring	2001 season	Next race: 2001 ELMS at Jarama

American Le Mans Series
Previous race: 2001 12 Hours of Sebring	2001 season	Next race: 2001 ELMS at Jarama
